= 2016 ITF Men's Circuit (July–September) =

The 2016 ITF Men's Circuit is the 2016 edition of the second-tier tour for men's professional tennis. It is organised by the International Tennis Federation and is a tier below the ATP Tour. The ITF Men's Circuit includes tournaments with prize money ranging from $10,000 up to $25,000.

== Key ==
$25,000 tournaments
$10,000 tournaments

== Month ==
=== July ===
| Week of | Tournament | Winner | Runners-up | Semifinalists | Quarterfinalists |
|---|---|---|---|---|---|
| July 4 | Canada F5 Futures; Saskatoon, Canada; Hard $25,000; Singles and doubles draws | (Canada) Philip Bester; 6–4, 4–6, 6–4 | (Canada) Peter Polansky | (Australia) Blake Mott (Israel) Edan Leshem | (Canada) Brayden Schnur (United Kingdom) Matthew Brooklyn (United States) Alexios Halebian (France) Sébastien Boltz |
| July 4 | Canada F5 Futures; Saskatoon, Canada; Hard $25,000; Singles and doubles draws | (Canada) Philip Bester (Canada) Peter Polansky; 6–3, 6–2 | (Canada) Christian Lakoseljac (Canada) David Volfson | (Australia) Blake Mott (Israel) Edan Leshem | (Canada) Brayden Schnur (United Kingdom) Matthew Brooklyn (United States) Alexios Halebian (France) Sébastien Boltz |
| July 4 | France F13 Futures; Bourg-en-Bresse, France; Clay $25,000; Singles and doubles draws | (Italy) Lorenzo Giustino; 6–4, 6–2 | (France) Romain Jouan | (Morocco) Lamine Ouahab (France) Jonathan Eysseric | (France) Alexis Musialek (Spain) Marc Fornell (India) Sriram Balaji (France) Benjamin Pietri |
| July 4 | France F13 Futures; Bourg-en-Bresse, France; Clay $25,000; Singles and doubles draws | (United States) Cătălin-Ionuț Gârd (Philippines) Ruben Gonzales; 2–6, 6–3, [10–7] | (Spain) Marc Fornell (Morocco) Lamine Ouahab | (Morocco) Lamine Ouahab (France) Jonathan Eysseric | (France) Alexis Musialek (Spain) Marc Fornell (India) Sriram Balaji (France) Benjamin Pietri |
| July 4 | Italy F19 Futures; Naples, Italy; Clay $25,000; Singles and doubles draws | (Chile) Cristian Garín; 6–2, 6–0 | (Argentina) Juan Pablo Paz | (Argentina) Tomás Lipovšek Puches (Brazil) João Pedro Sorgi | (Spain) Gerard Granollers (Italy) Matteo Fago (Argentina) Hernán Casanova (Brazil) Marcelo Zormann |
| July 4 | Italy F19 Futures; Naples, Italy; Clay $25,000; Singles and doubles draws | (Italy) Filippo Baldi (Italy) Andrea Pellegrino; 5–7, 7–5, [10–2] | (Brazil) Eduardo Dischinger (Argentina) Juan Pablo Paz | (Argentina) Tomás Lipovšek Puches (Brazil) João Pedro Sorgi | (Spain) Gerard Granollers (Italy) Matteo Fago (Argentina) Hernán Casanova (Brazil) Marcelo Zormann |
| July 4 | Netherlands F4 Futures; Amstelveen, Netherlands; Clay $25,000; Singles and doubles draws | (Georgia (country)) Aleksandre Metreveli; 6–2, 6–0 | (Netherlands) Jelle Sels | (Netherlands) Botic van de Zandschulp (Netherlands) Antal van der Duim | (Netherlands) Miliaan Niesten (Belgium) Christopher Heyman (Russia) Alexey Vatutin (Netherlands) Gijs Brouwer |
| July 4 | Netherlands F4 Futures; Amstelveen, Netherlands; Clay $25,000; Singles and doubles draws | (Netherlands) David Pel (Brazil) José Pereira; 6–4, 3–6, [10–3] | (Netherlands) Miliaan Niesten (Netherlands) Boy Westerhof | (Netherlands) Botic van de Zandschulp (Netherlands) Antal van der Duim | (Netherlands) Miliaan Niesten (Belgium) Christopher Heyman (Russia) Alexey Vatutin (Netherlands) Gijs Brouwer |
| July 4 | Austria F1 Futures; Telfs, Austria; Clay $10,000; Singles and doubles draws | (Portugal) Gonçalo Oliveira; 7–6^{(7–4)}, 3–6, 6–1 | (Germany) Yannick Hanfmann | (Austria) Sebastian Ofner (Germany) Pascal Meis | (Hungary) Péter Nagy (Italy) Andrea Basso (Poland) Andriej Kapaś (Australia) Bradley Mousley |
| July 4 | Austria F1 Futures; Telfs, Austria; Clay $10,000; Singles and doubles draws | (Poland) Andriej Kapaś (Poland) Grzegorz Panfil; 7–5, 7–5 | (Germany) Pascal Meis (Austria) Philipp Schroll | (Austria) Sebastian Ofner (Germany) Pascal Meis | (Hungary) Péter Nagy (Italy) Andrea Basso (Poland) Andriej Kapaś (Australia) Bradley Mousley |
| July 4 | Belgium F4 Futures; De Haan, Belgium; Clay $10,000; Singles and doubles draws | (Belgium) Maxime Authom; 6–1, 4–6, 7–5 | (Belgium) Yannick Vandenbulcke | (France) Antoine Hoang (Belgium) Michael Geerts | (Belgium) Joris De Loore (Sweden) Jakob Johansson-Holm (Belgium) Stijn Meulemans (United States) Collin Altamirano |
| July 4 | Belgium F4 Futures; De Haan, Belgium; Clay $10,000; Singles and doubles draws | (Belgium) Michael Geerts (Belgium) Jeroen Vanneste; 7–5, 6–2 | (Belgium) Dennis Bogaert (Belgium) Jonas Merckx | (France) Antoine Hoang (Belgium) Michael Geerts | (Belgium) Joris De Loore (Sweden) Jakob Johansson-Holm (Belgium) Stijn Meulemans (United States) Collin Altamirano |
| July 4 | Brazil F2 Futures; São José do Rio Preto, Brazil; Clay $10,000; Singles and doubles draws | (Brazil) Fernando Romboli; 6–4, 6–3 | (Brazil) Oscar José Gutierrez | (Brazil) Rafael Matos (Brazil) Tiago Lopes | (Brazil) Nicolas Santos (Brazil) Wilson Leite (Argentina) Gabriel Alejandro Hidalgo (Brazil) Ricardo Hocevar |
| July 4 | Brazil F2 Futures; São José do Rio Preto, Brazil; Clay $10,000; Singles and doubles draws | (Brazil) Filipe Brandão (Brazil) Oscar José Gutierrez; 7–5, 7–6^{(7–1)} | (Brazil) Marcelo Tebet (Brazil) Fernando Yamacita | (Brazil) Rafael Matos (Brazil) Tiago Lopes | (Brazil) Nicolas Santos (Brazil) Wilson Leite (Argentina) Gabriel Alejandro Hidalgo (Brazil) Ricardo Hocevar |
| July 4 | China F11 Futures; Anning, China; Clay $10,000; Singles and doubles draws | (Austria) Bastian Trinker; 7–6^{(7–5)}, 7–6^{(7–4)} | (Australia) Maverick Banes | (Japan) Issei Okamura (Chinese Taipei) Lee Kuan-yi | (China) Qiu Zhuoyang (China) Te Rigele (China) Sun Fajing (India) Ranjeet Virali-Murugesan |
| July 4 | China F11 Futures; Anning, China; Clay $10,000; Singles and doubles draws | (China) Sun Fajing (China) Wang Aoran; 6–3, 6–4 | (China) Ning Yuqing (China) Qiu Zhuoyang | (Japan) Issei Okamura (Chinese Taipei) Lee Kuan-yi | (China) Qiu Zhuoyang (China) Te Rigele (China) Sun Fajing (India) Ranjeet Virali-Murugesan |
| July 4 | Czech Republic F5 Futures; Ústí nad Orlicí, Czech Republic; Clay $10,000; Singles and doubles draws | (Belarus) Uladzimir Ignatik; 6–1, 6–4 | (Poland) Pawel Ciaś | (Czech Republic) Dominik Kellovský (Czech Republic) Václav Šafránek | (Czech Republic) Vít Kopřiva (Italy) Eros Siringo (Slovakia) Matej Maruščák (Austria) David Pichler |
| July 4 | Czech Republic F5 Futures; Ústí nad Orlicí, Czech Republic; Clay $10,000; Singles and doubles draws | (Czech Republic) Filip Doležel (Czech Republic) Václav Šafránek; 7–5, 1–6, [10–6] | (Ukraine) Filipp Kekercheni (Austria) David Pichler | (Czech Republic) Dominik Kellovský (Czech Republic) Václav Šafránek | (Czech Republic) Vít Kopřiva (Italy) Eros Siringo (Slovakia) Matej Maruščák (Austria) David Pichler |
| July 4 | Egypt F14 Futures; Sharm El Sheikh, Egypt; Hard $10,000; Singles and doubles draws | (Bosnia and Herzegovina) Aldin Šetkić; 6–4, 6–2 | (Czech Republic) Tomáš Papík | (United States) Jarmere Jenkins (Italy) Luca Pancaldi | (Italy) Lorenzo Frigerio (Tunisia) Mohamed Aziz Dougaz (Italy) Francesco Vilardo (Italy) Alessandro Bega |
| July 4 | Egypt F14 Futures; Sharm El Sheikh, Egypt; Hard $10,000; Singles and doubles draws | (United States) Jarmere Jenkins (United States) Anderson Reed; 6–3, 6–2 | (Tunisia) Mohamed Aziz Dougaz (Spain) Javier Pulgar-García | (United States) Jarmere Jenkins (Italy) Luca Pancaldi | (Italy) Lorenzo Frigerio (Tunisia) Mohamed Aziz Dougaz (Italy) Francesco Vilardo (Italy) Alessandro Bega |
| July 4 | Macedonia F3 Futures; Skopje, Macedonia; Clay $10,000; Singles and doubles draws | (Croatia) Kristijan Mesaroš; 4–6, 6–3, 3–0, ret. | (Italy) Claudio Fortuna | (United Kingdom) Richard Gabb (Austria) Lenny Hampel | (United Kingdom) Neil Pauffley (Montenegro) Ljubomir Čelebić (Croatia) Nino Serdarušić (Slovakia) Patrik Fabian |
| July 4 | Macedonia F3 Futures; Skopje, Macedonia; Clay $10,000; Singles and doubles draws | (United Kingdom) Richard Gabb (United Kingdom) Neil Pauffley; 6–4, 6–4 | (North Macedonia) Tomislav Jotovski (North Macedonia) Predrag Rusevski | (United Kingdom) Richard Gabb (Austria) Lenny Hampel | (United Kingdom) Neil Pauffley (Montenegro) Ljubomir Čelebić (Croatia) Nino Serdarušić (Slovakia) Patrik Fabian |
| July 4 | Germany F6 Futures; Saarlouis, Germany; Clay $10,000; Singles and doubles draws | (Germany) Marvin Netuschil; 6–2, 6–4 | (Slovakia) Filip Horanský | (Germany) Johan Willems (Brazil) Bruno Sant'Anna | (Slovenia) Nik Razboršek (Germany) Jakob Sude (Chile) Cristóbal Saavedra (Czech Republic) Marek Jaloviec |
| July 4 | Germany F6 Futures; Saarlouis, Germany; Clay $10,000; Singles and doubles draws | (Germany) Sebastian Fanselow (Germany) Julian Lenz; 7–6^{(7–4)}, 6–3 | (Uruguay) Marcel Felder (Argentina) Manuel Peña López | (Germany) Johan Willems (Brazil) Bruno Sant'Anna | (Slovenia) Nik Razboršek (Germany) Jakob Sude (Chile) Cristóbal Saavedra (Czech Republic) Marek Jaloviec |
| July 4 | Korea F4 Futures; Gimcheon, Korea; Hard $10,000; Singles and doubles draws | (Japan) Makoto Ochi; 2–6, 6–0, 6–1 | (Chinese Taipei) Chen Ti | (China) Wang Chuhan (South Korea) Nam Ji-sung | (India) Sidharth Rawat (South Korea) Moon Ju-hae (South Korea) Kim Cheong-eui (South Korea) Song Min-kyu |
| July 4 | Korea F4 Futures; Gimcheon, Korea; Hard $10,000; Singles and doubles draws | (South Korea) Nam Ji-sung (South Korea) Song Min-kyu; 6–4, 6–4 | (Japan) Shintaro Imai (Japan) Takuto Niki | (China) Wang Chuhan (South Korea) Nam Ji-sung | (India) Sidharth Rawat (South Korea) Moon Ju-hae (South Korea) Kim Cheong-eui (South Korea) Song Min-kyu |
| July 4 | Russia F3 Futures; Kazan, Russia; Clay $10,000; Singles and doubles draws | (Russia) Anton Zaitcev; 3–6, 6–1, 6–4 | (Spain) Marc Giner | (Russia) Anton Galkin (Russia) Richard Muzaev | (Russia) Alexander Zhurbin (Russia) Maxim Ratniuk (Russia) Ivan Davydov (Russia) Vladimir Korolev |
| July 4 | Russia F3 Futures; Kazan, Russia; Clay $10,000; Singles and doubles draws | (Russia) Vladimir Korolev (Russia) Richard Muzaev; 7–5, 4–6, [10–6] | (Russia) Aleksandr Vasilenko (Russia) Anton Zaitcev | (Russia) Anton Galkin (Russia) Richard Muzaev | (Russia) Alexander Zhurbin (Russia) Maxim Ratniuk (Russia) Ivan Davydov (Russia) Vladimir Korolev |
| July 4 | Spain F20 Futures; Getxo, Spain; Clay $10,000; Singles and doubles draws | (Spain) Ricardo Ojeda Lara; 6–1, 6–4 | (Spain) Pedro Martínez | (Spain) Carlos Boluda-Purkiss (Spain) Jaume Munar | (Portugal) Frederico Gil (Spain) Bernabé Zapata Miralles (Spain) Jaume Pla Malfeito (Spain) Carlos Taberner |
| July 4 | Spain F20 Futures; Getxo, Spain; Clay $10,000; Singles and doubles draws | (Spain) Álvaro López San Martín (Spain) Jaume Munar; 6–4, ret. | (Spain) Juan Lizariturry (Spain) Jaume Pla Malfeito | (Spain) Carlos Boluda-Purkiss (Spain) Jaume Munar | (Portugal) Frederico Gil (Spain) Bernabé Zapata Miralles (Spain) Jaume Pla Malfeito (Spain) Carlos Taberner |
| July 4 | Turkey F27 Futures; Antalya, Turkey; Hard $10,000; Singles and doubles draws | (Israel) Bar Tzuf Botzer; 7–5, 3–6, 6–2 | (France) Yannick Jankovits | (Argentina) Camilo Ugo Carabelli (Brazil) Fabiano de Paula | (Italy) Nicolò Turchetti (France) Hugo Grenier (Canada) Martin Beran (Lithuania) Lukas Mugevičius |
| July 4 | Turkey F27 Futures; Antalya, Turkey; Hard $10,000; Singles and doubles draws | (Argentina) Franco Agamenone (Argentina) Mariano Kestelboim; 6–4, 6–3 | (Brazil) Pedro Bernardi (Brazil) Fabiano de Paula | (Argentina) Camilo Ugo Carabelli (Brazil) Fabiano de Paula | (Italy) Nicolò Turchetti (France) Hugo Grenier (Canada) Martin Beran (Lithuania) Lukas Mugevičius |
| July 4 | Zimbabwe F3 Futures; Harare, Zimbabwe; Hard $10,000; Singles and doubles draws | (South Africa) Tucker Vorster; 3–6, 6–4, 7–5 | (South Africa) Nicolaas Scholtz | (Italy) Andrea Vavassori (France) Hugo Nys | (Australia) Marc Polmans (India) Vishnu Vardhan (Argentina) Matías Franco Descotte (Australia) Jeremy Beale |
| July 4 | Zimbabwe F3 Futures; Harare, Zimbabwe; Hard $10,000; Singles and doubles draws | (France) Hugo Nys (India) Vishnu Vardhan; 6–7^{(5–7)}, 6–4, [10–5] | (Zimbabwe) Benjamin Lock (Zimbabwe) Courtney John Lock | (Italy) Andrea Vavassori (France) Hugo Nys | (Australia) Marc Polmans (India) Vishnu Vardhan (Argentina) Matías Franco Descotte (Australia) Jeremy Beale |
| July 11 | Austria F2 Futures; Kramsach, Austria; Clay $10,000; Singles and doubles draws | (Germany) Yannick Hanfmann; 6–4, 6–4 | (Greece) Stefanos Tsitsipas | (Czech Republic) Marek Jaloviec (Austria) Maximilian Neuchrist | (France) Corentin Denolly (Germany) Sebastian Prechtel (Portugal) Gonçalo Oliveira (Slovenia) Nik Razboršek |
| July 11 | Austria F2 Futures; Kramsach, Austria; Clay $10,000; Singles and doubles draws | (Austria) Maximilian Neuchrist (Netherlands) David Pel; 6–3, 5–7, [10–4] | (Austria) Sebastian Bader (Austria) Matthias Haim | (Czech Republic) Marek Jaloviec (Austria) Maximilian Neuchrist | (France) Corentin Denolly (Germany) Sebastian Prechtel (Portugal) Gonçalo Oliveira (Slovenia) Nik Razboršek |
| July 11 | Belgium F5 Futures; Westende, Belgium; Hard $10,000; Singles and doubles draws | (Belgium) Ruben Bemelmans; 6–3, 6–7^{(3–7)}, 6–1 | (Belgium) Yannick Mertens | (Belgium) Michael Geerts (Belgium) Maxime Authom | (France) Ronan Joncour (Sweden) Patrik Rosenholm (Belgium) Niels Desein (Belgium) Alexandre Folie |
| July 11 | Belgium F5 Futures; Westende, Belgium; Hard $10,000; Singles and doubles draws | (Belgium) Ruben Bemelmans (Belgium) Yannick Mertens; 6–1, 6–1 | (United States) Hunter Johnson (United States) Yates Johnson | (Belgium) Michael Geerts (Belgium) Maxime Authom | (France) Ronan Joncour (Sweden) Patrik Rosenholm (Belgium) Niels Desein (Belgium) Alexandre Folie |
| July 11 | Brazil F3 Futures; Catanduva, Brazil; Clay $10,000; Singles and doubles draws | (Argentina) Gabriel Alejandro Hidalgo; 6–3, 6–4 | (Brazil) Ricardo Hocevar | (Brazil) Fernando Yamacita (Brazil) Igor Marcondes | (Brazil) André Miele (Argentina) Federico Nicolás Bertucci (Brazil) Laurenço Gasperini (Brazil) Rafael Matos |
| July 11 | Brazil F3 Futures; Catanduva, Brazil; Clay $10,000; Singles and doubles draws | (Brazil) Daniel Dutra da Silva (Brazil) Eduardo Russi Assumpção; 1–6, 6–4, [10–4] | (Brazil) Filipe Brandão (Brazil) Oscar José Gutierrez | (Brazil) Fernando Yamacita (Brazil) Igor Marcondes | (Brazil) André Miele (Argentina) Federico Nicolás Bertucci (Brazil) Laurenço Gasperini (Brazil) Rafael Matos |
| July 11 | China F12 Futures; Anning, China; Clay $10,000; Singles and doubles draws | (Chinese Taipei) Lee Kuan-yi; 7–5, 6–3 | (Austria) Bastian Trinker | (Japan) Ryota Tanuma (Japan) Issei Okamura | (India) Ranjeet Virali-Murugesan (Japan) Soichiro Moritani (Australia) Mitchell William Robins (China) Sun Fajing |
| July 11 | China F12 Futures; Anning, China; Clay $10,000; Singles and doubles draws | (Australia) Thomas Fancutt (Australia) Mitchell William Robins; 7–6^{(8–6)}, 6–4 | (Japan) Koichi Sano (Japan) Shunrou Takeshima | (Japan) Ryota Tanuma (Japan) Issei Okamura | (India) Ranjeet Virali-Murugesan (Japan) Soichiro Moritani (Australia) Mitchell William Robins (China) Sun Fajing |
| July 11 | Czech Republic F6 Futures; Brno, Czech Republic; Clay $10,000; Singles and doubles draws | (Czech Republic) Václav Šafránek; 6–1, 6–2 | (Czech Republic) Pavel Nejedlý | (Germany) Julian Onken (Czech Republic) Petr Michnev | (Czech Republic) Filip Doležel (Chile) Cristóbal Saavedra (Chile) Laslo Urrutia Fuentes (Austria) David Pichler |
| July 11 | Czech Republic F6 Futures; Brno, Czech Republic; Clay $10,000; Singles and doubles draws | (Ukraine) Danylo Kalenichenko (Austria) David Pichler; 6–4, 4–6, [10–8] | (Czech Republic) Dominik Kellovský (Czech Republic) Václav Šafránek | (Germany) Julian Onken (Czech Republic) Petr Michnev | (Czech Republic) Filip Doležel (Chile) Cristóbal Saavedra (Chile) Laslo Urrutia Fuentes (Austria) David Pichler |
| July 11 | Egypt F15 Futures; Sharm El Sheikh, Egypt; Hard $10,000; Singles and doubles draws | (Czech Republic) Tomáš Papík; 6–3, 6–4 | (Italy) Luca Pancaldi | (Uzbekistan) Alan Gadjiev (United States) Jarmere Jenkins | (Egypt) Issam Haitham Taweel (Poland) Kamil Gajewski (Tunisia) Majed Kilani (Réunion) Quentin Robert |
| July 11 | Egypt F15 Futures; Sharm El Sheikh, Egypt; Hard $10,000; Singles and doubles draws | (Poland) Adrian Andrzejczuk (Poland) Mateusz Smolicki; 7–5, 6–2 | (United Kingdom) Dylan Gee (Serbia) Željko Milović | (Uzbekistan) Alan Gadjiev (United States) Jarmere Jenkins | (Egypt) Issam Haitham Taweel (Poland) Kamil Gajewski (Tunisia) Majed Kilani (Réunion) Quentin Robert |
| July 11 | France F14 Futures; Saint-Gervais-les-Bains, France; Clay $10,000; Singles and doubles draws | (France) Maxime Hamou; 7–5, 6–2 | (France) Alexis Musialek | (France) Antoine Hoang (China) Gao Xin | (France) Corentin Moutet (France) Manuel Guinard (France) Louis Tessa (China) Zhang Zhizhen |
| July 11 | France F14 Futures; Saint-Gervais-les-Bains, France; Clay $10,000; Singles and doubles draws | (France) Antoine Hoang (France) Louis Tessa; 3–6, 6–4, [10–6] | (China) Gao Xin (China) Ouyang Bowen | (France) Antoine Hoang (China) Gao Xin | (France) Corentin Moutet (France) Manuel Guinard (France) Louis Tessa (China) Zhang Zhizhen |
| July 11 | Germany F7 Futures; Trier, Germany; Clay $10,000; Singles and doubles draws | (Germany) Maximilian Marterer; 6–1, 6–2 | (Argentina) Federico Coria | (Belgium) Germain Gigounon (Germany) Marvin Netuschil | (Spain) Marcos Giraldi Requena (Netherlands) Colin van Beem (Netherlands) Tallon Griekspoor (Australia) Gavin van Peperzeel |
| July 11 | Germany F7 Futures; Trier, Germany; Clay $10,000; Singles and doubles draws | (Belgium) Germain Gigounon (Belgium) Jeroen Vanneste; 6–4, 6–3 | (Netherlands) Roy Sarut de Valk (Germany) Peter Torebko | (Belgium) Germain Gigounon (Germany) Marvin Netuschil | (Spain) Marcos Giraldi Requena (Netherlands) Colin van Beem (Netherlands) Tallon Griekspoor (Australia) Gavin van Peperzeel |
| July 11 | Italy F20 Futures; Casinalbo, Italy; Clay $10,000; Singles and doubles draws | (Italy) Andrea Pellegrino; 6–4, 1–6, 6–4 | (Italy) Davide Galoppini | (Italy) Adelchi Virgili (Italy) Francisco Bahamonde | (Italy) Riccardo Balzerani (Italy) Jacopo Stefanini (Italy) Daniele Capecchi (Italy) Francesco Picco |
| July 11 | Italy F20 Futures; Casinalbo, Italy; Clay $10,000; Singles and doubles draws | (Italy) Riccardo Balzerani (Italy) Enrico Dalla Valle; 6–3, 6–3 | (Germany) Pirmin Hänle (France) Alexandre Müller | (Italy) Adelchi Virgili (Italy) Francisco Bahamonde | (Italy) Riccardo Balzerani (Italy) Jacopo Stefanini (Italy) Daniele Capecchi (Italy) Francesco Picco |
| July 11 | Korea F5 Futures; Gimcheon, Korea; Hard $10,000; Singles and doubles draws | (South Korea) Kwon Soon-woo; 6–4, 6–4 | (South Korea) Cho Min-hyeok | (Japan) Makoto Ochi (Japan) Yuya Kibi | (Israel) Edan Leshem (South Korea) Lee Jea-moon (Japan) Takuto Niki (Japan) Renta Tokuda |
| July 11 | Korea F5 Futures; Gimcheon, Korea; Hard $10,000; Singles and doubles draws | (South Korea) Kim Cheong-eui (South Korea) Noh Sang-woo; 7–6^{(7–5)}, 6–7^{(4–7)}, [10–4] | (South Korea) Nam Ji-sung (South Korea) Song Min-kyu | (Japan) Makoto Ochi (Japan) Yuya Kibi | (Israel) Edan Leshem (South Korea) Lee Jea-moon (Japan) Takuto Niki (Japan) Renta Tokuda |
| July 11 | Portugal F8 Futures; Idanha-a-Nova, Portugal; Hard $10,000; Singles and doubles draws | (Portugal) João Monteiro; 6–3, 6–2 | (France) Hugo Grenier | (France) Antoine Escoffier (Portugal) Frederico Gil | (France) Albano Olivetti (Israel) Ben Patael (Portugal) Tiago Cação (Portugal) André Gaspar Murta |
| July 11 | Portugal F8 Futures; Idanha-a-Nova, Portugal; Hard $10,000; Singles and doubles draws | (Portugal) Nuno Deus (Portugal) Frederico Gil; 3–6, 7–6^{(7–4)}, [10–5] | (France) Hugo Grenier (France) Albano Olivetti | (France) Antoine Escoffier (Portugal) Frederico Gil | (France) Albano Olivetti (Israel) Ben Patael (Portugal) Tiago Cação (Portugal) André Gaspar Murta |
| July 11 | Spain F21 Futures; Gandia, Spain; Clay $10,000; Singles and doubles draws | (Spain) Jaume Munar; 6–3, 6–4 | (Russia) Ivan Gakhov | (Spain) Marc Giner (Spain) Bernabé Zapata Miralles | (Spain) Pedro Martínez (Russia) Alexander Zhurbin (Spain) Eduard Esteve Lobato (Spain) Álvaro López San Martín |
| July 11 | Spain F21 Futures; Gandia, Spain; Clay $10,000; Singles and doubles draws | (Spain) Marc Giner (Germany) Jean-Marc Werner; 6–4, 6–1 | (Spain) Sergio Martos Gornés (Spain) Adria Mas Mascolo | (Spain) Marc Giner (Spain) Bernabé Zapata Miralles | (Spain) Pedro Martínez (Russia) Alexander Zhurbin (Spain) Eduard Esteve Lobato (Spain) Álvaro López San Martín |
| July 11 | Turkey F28 Futures; Antalya, Turkey; Hard $10,000; Singles and doubles draws | Unfinished due to the disturbances in Turkey created by the 2016 Turkish coup d'état attempt | | (France) Yannick Jankovits (Israel) Bar Tzuf Botzer (Turkey) Altuğ Çelikbilek (Argentina) Mariano Kestelboim | (United Kingdom) Samm Butler (Italy) Pietro Licciardi (Austria) Thomas Statzberger (Belgium) Julien Dubail |
| July 11 | Turkey F28 Futures; Antalya, Turkey; Hard $10,000; Singles and doubles draws | Unfinished due to the disturbances in Turkey created by the 2016 Turkish coup d'état attempt | | (France) Yannick Jankovits (Israel) Bar Tzuf Botzer (Turkey) Altuğ Çelikbilek (Argentina) Mariano Kestelboim | (United Kingdom) Samm Butler (Italy) Pietro Licciardi (Austria) Thomas Statzberger (Belgium) Julien Dubail |
| July 18 | France F15 Futures; Troyes, France; Clay $25,000; Singles and doubles draws | (France) Jonathan Eysseric; 6–2, 5–7, 6–2 | (France) Tak Khunn Wang | (France) Maxime Mora (France) Calvin Hemery | (Austria) Gibril Diarra (France) Maxime Hamou (France) Alexis Musialek (France) Constant de la Bassetière |
| July 18 | France F15 Futures; Troyes, France; Clay $25,000; Singles and doubles draws | (France) Jonathan Eysseric (Brazil) Fernando Romboli; 6–4, 6–1 | (Ukraine) Vadim Alekseenko (France) Maxime Mora | (France) Maxime Mora (France) Calvin Hemery | (Austria) Gibril Diarra (France) Maxime Hamou (France) Alexis Musialek (France) Constant de la Bassetière |
| July 18 | Germany F8 Futures; Kassel, Germany; Clay $25,000+H; Singles and doubles draws | (Germany) Yannick Hanfmann; 7–6^{(7–5)}, 6–1 | (Germany) Julian Lenz | (Dominican Republic) José Hernández-Fernández (Ecuador) Giovanni Lapentti | (Spain) Gerard Granollers (Germany) George von Massow (France) Sadio Doumbia (Germany) Daniel Masur |
| July 18 | Germany F8 Futures; Kassel, Germany; Clay $25,000+H; Singles and doubles draws | (Austria) Maximilian Neuchrist (Netherlands) David Pel; 6–2, 7–6^{(7–5)} | (Czech Republic) Petr Nouza (Czech Republic) David Škoch | (Dominican Republic) José Hernández-Fernández (Ecuador) Giovanni Lapentti | (Spain) Gerard Granollers (Germany) George von Massow (France) Sadio Doumbia (Germany) Daniel Masur |
| July 18 | USA F24 Futures; Godfrey, United States; Hard $25,000; Singles and doubles draws | (United States) Tennys Sandgren; 6–0, 6–4 | (Argentina) Facundo Mena | (United States) Rhyne Williams (United Kingdom) Luke Bambridge | (United States) Wil Spencer (United States) Jonathan Chang (United States) Collin Johns (Australia) Marc Polmans |
| July 18 | USA F24 Futures; Godfrey, United States; Hard $25,000; Singles and doubles draws | (United States) Nathan Ponwith (United States) Emil Reinberg; 6–3, 6–4 | (Venezuela) Jesús Bandrés (Argentina) Facundo Mena | (United States) Rhyne Williams (United Kingdom) Luke Bambridge | (United States) Wil Spencer (United States) Jonathan Chang (United States) Collin Johns (Australia) Marc Polmans |
| July 18 | Austria F3 Futures; Bad Waltersdorf, Austria; Clay $10,000; Singles and doubles draws | (Austria) Sebastian Ofner; 6–4, 4–6, 6–3 | (France) Corentin Denolly | (Slovenia) Tom Kočevar-Dešman (Slovenia) Nik Razboršek | (Czech Republic) Filip Brtnický (Czech Republic) Petr Michnev (Italy) Luca Giacomini (Italy) Fabrizio Ornago |
| July 18 | Austria F3 Futures; Bad Waltersdorf, Austria; Clay $10,000; Singles and doubles draws | (Austria) Bernd Kossler (Austria) Gregor Ramskogler; 6–4, 2–6, [10–4] | (Austria) Sebastian Bader (Austria) Sebastian Ofner | (Slovenia) Tom Kočevar-Dešman (Slovenia) Nik Razboršek | (Czech Republic) Filip Brtnický (Czech Republic) Petr Michnev (Italy) Luca Giacomini (Italy) Fabrizio Ornago |
| July 18 | Belgium F6 Futures; Knokke, Belgium; Clay $10,000; Singles and doubles draws | (Germany) Daniel Altmaier; 6–7^{(3–7)}, 6–1, 7–6^{(7–3)} | (Norway) Casper Ruud | (Belgium) Joran Vliegen (France) Jules Okala | (Belgium) Niels Desein (United Kingdom) Tom Farquharson (Belgium) Omar Salman (Belgium) Sander Gillé |
| July 18 | Belgium F6 Futures; Knokke, Belgium; Clay $10,000; Singles and doubles draws | (Belgium) Sander Gillé (Belgium) Joran Vliegen; 6–4, 6–4 | (United States) Hunter Johnson (United States) Yates Johnson | (Belgium) Joran Vliegen (France) Jules Okala | (Belgium) Niels Desein (United Kingdom) Tom Farquharson (Belgium) Omar Salman (Belgium) Sander Gillé |
| July 18 | Brazil F4 Futures; Campos do Jordão, Brazil; Hard $10,000; Singles and doubles draws | (Brazil) José Pereira; 7–5, 7–5 | (Argentina) Mateo Nicolás Martínez | (Brazil) Leonardo Civita-Telles (Brazil) Carlos Eduardo Severino | (United States) Andrew Carter (Brazil) Ricardo Hocevar (Brazil) Filipe Brandão (Brazil) André Miele |
| July 18 | Brazil F4 Futures; Campos do Jordão, Brazil; Hard $10,000; Singles and doubles draws | (Brazil) Ricardo Hocevar (Brazil) André Miele; 7–6^{(10–8)}, 6–4 | (Brazil) Leonardo Civita-Telles (Brazil) Gabriel Décamps | (Brazil) Leonardo Civita-Telles (Brazil) Carlos Eduardo Severino | (United States) Andrew Carter (Brazil) Ricardo Hocevar (Brazil) Filipe Brandão (Brazil) André Miele |
| July 18 | China F13 Futures; Anning, China; Clay $10,000; Singles and doubles draws | (Australia) Thomas Fancutt; 6–2, 6–4 | (Japan) Issei Okamura | (Japan) Ryota Tanuma (Chinese Taipei) Lee Kuan-yi | (China) Sun Fajing (India) Ranjeet Virali-Murugesan (China) Wu Yibing (China) He Yecong |
| July 18 | China F13 Futures; Anning, China; Clay $10,000; Singles and doubles draws | (Chinese Taipei) Lee Kuan-yi (China) Te Rigele; 3–6, 7–5, [10–8] | (Japan) Koichi Sano (Japan) Shunrou Takeshima | (Japan) Ryota Tanuma (Chinese Taipei) Lee Kuan-yi | (China) Sun Fajing (India) Ranjeet Virali-Murugesan (China) Wu Yibing (China) He Yecong |
| July 18 | Egypt F16 Futures; Sharm El Sheikh, Egypt; Hard $10,000; Singles and doubles draws | (United States) Adam El Mihdawy; 6–2, 6–4 | (Zimbabwe) Benjamin Lock | (United States) Jarmere Jenkins (Uzbekistan) Alan Gadjiev | (Italy) Francesco Garzelli (Spain) José Francisco Vidal Azorín (Tunisia) Majed Kilani (India) Manish Sureshkumar |
| July 18 | Egypt F16 Futures; Sharm El Sheikh, Egypt; Hard $10,000; Singles and doubles draws | (Zimbabwe) Benjamin Lock (Zimbabwe) Courtney John Lock; 3–6, 6–3, [10–8] | (United States) Jarmere Jenkins (United States) Anderson Reed | (United States) Jarmere Jenkins (Uzbekistan) Alan Gadjiev | (Italy) Francesco Garzelli (Spain) José Francisco Vidal Azorín (Tunisia) Majed Kilani (India) Manish Sureshkumar |
| July 18 | Italy F21 Futures; Gubbio, Italy; Clay $10,000; Singles and doubles draws | (Italy) Andrea Pellegrino; 7–5, 6–1 | (Argentina) Federico Coria | (Italy) Stefano Travaglia (France) Grégoire Jacq | (Italy) Andrea Basso (France) Alexandre Müller (Italy) Omar Giacalone (Italy) Francisco Bahamonde |
| July 18 | Italy F21 Futures; Gubbio, Italy; Clay $10,000; Singles and doubles draws | (France) Benjamin Bonzi (France) Grégoire Jacq; 6–2, 6–1 | (Italy) Cristian Carli (Italy) Alessandro Colella | (Italy) Stefano Travaglia (France) Grégoire Jacq | (Italy) Andrea Basso (France) Alexandre Müller (Italy) Omar Giacalone (Italy) Francisco Bahamonde |
| July 18 | Lithuania F1 Futures; Vilnius, Lithuania; Clay $10,000; Singles and doubles draws | (Latvia) Miķelis Lībietis; 6–2, 6–7^{(2–7)}, 6–0 | (Latvia) Krišjānis Stabiņš | (Russia) Ivan Gakhov (Sweden) Fred Simonsson | (Lithuania) Laurynas Grigelis (Germany) Pirmin Hänle (Belarus) Mikalai Haliak (Lithuania) Julius Tverijonas |
| July 18 | Lithuania F1 Futures; Vilnius, Lithuania; Clay $10,000; Singles and doubles draws | (Lithuania) Laurynas Grigelis (Lithuania) Lukas Mugevičius; 7–5, 6–4 | (Poland) Michał Dembek (Poland) Jan Zieliński | (Russia) Ivan Gakhov (Sweden) Fred Simonsson | (Lithuania) Laurynas Grigelis (Germany) Pirmin Hänle (Belarus) Mikalai Haliak (Lithuania) Julius Tverijonas |
| July 18 | Portugal F9 Futures; Idanha-a-Nova, Portugal; Hard $10,000; Singles and doubles draws | (Israel) Ben Patael; 7–6^{(7–2)}, 6–4 | (Portugal) André Gaspar Murta | (France) Hugo Voljacques (France) Hugo Grenier | (Portugal) Nuno Borges (Portugal) João Monteiro (Israel) Alon Elia (United States) Hunter Reese |
| July 18 | Portugal F9 Futures; Idanha-a-Nova, Portugal; Hard $10,000; Singles and doubles draws | (United Kingdom) Scott Clayton (United Kingdom) Jonny O'Mara; 6–2, 6–4 | (Portugal) Nuno Deus (Spain) Jorge Hernando-Ruano | (France) Hugo Voljacques (France) Hugo Grenier | (Portugal) Nuno Borges (Portugal) João Monteiro (Israel) Alon Elia (United States) Hunter Reese |
| July 18 | Romania F9 Futures; Pitești, Romania; Clay $10,000; Singles and doubles draws | (Romania) Dragoș Dima; 6–2, 7–5 | (France) Jordan Ubiergo | (Hungary) Gábor Borsos (Romania) Nicolae Frunză | (Romania) Bogdan Borza (Argentina) Mariano Kestelboim (Netherlands) Miliaan Niesten (Romania) Alexandru Jecan |
| July 18 | Romania F9 Futures; Pitești, Romania; Clay $10,000; Singles and doubles draws | (Romania) Andrei Ștefan Apostol (Romania) Nicolae Frunză; 6–3, 6–3 | (Romania) Patrick Grigoriu (Romania) Alexandru Jecan | (Hungary) Gábor Borsos (Romania) Nicolae Frunză | (Romania) Bogdan Borza (Argentina) Mariano Kestelboim (Netherlands) Miliaan Niesten (Romania) Alexandru Jecan |
| July 18 | Serbia F1 Futures; Belgrade, Serbia; Clay $10,000; Singles and doubles draws | (Australia) Christopher O'Connell; 6–4, 6–1 | (Bosnia and Herzegovina) Nerman Fatić | (Serbia) Darko Jandrić (Serbia) Milan Drinić | (North Macedonia) Tomislav Jotovski (Serbia) Ivan Bjelica (France) Florent Diep (Hungary) Viktor Filipenkó |
| July 18 | Serbia F1 Futures; Belgrade, Serbia; Clay $10,000; Singles and doubles draws | (Serbia) Nebojša Perić (Serbia) Strahinja Rakić; 5–7, 6–2, [10–6] | (Serbia) Ivan Bjelica (Serbia) Arsenije Zlatanović | (Serbia) Darko Jandrić (Serbia) Milan Drinić | (North Macedonia) Tomislav Jotovski (Serbia) Ivan Bjelica (France) Florent Diep (Hungary) Viktor Filipenkó |
| July 18 | Spain F22 Futures; Dénia, Spain; Clay $10,000; Singles and doubles draws | (Spain) Carlos Taberner; 4–6, 7–5, 7–5 | (Spain) Jaume Munar | (Spain) Bernabé Zapata Miralles (Spain) Albert Alcaraz Ivorra | (Spain) Marc Giner (Spain) Carlos Boluda-Purkiss (Spain) David Jordà Sanchis (Spain) Juan Lizariturry |
| July 18 | Spain F22 Futures; Dénia, Spain; Clay $10,000; Singles and doubles draws | (Spain) Marc Giner (Spain) Carlos Taberner; 6–3, 6–1 | (Spain) Sergio Martos Gornés (Spain) Adria Mas Mascolo | (Spain) Bernabé Zapata Miralles (Spain) Albert Alcaraz Ivorra | (Spain) Marc Giner (Spain) Carlos Boluda-Purkiss (Spain) David Jordà Sanchis (Spain) Juan Lizariturry |
| July 25 | France F16 Futures; Ajaccio, France; Hard $25,000; Singles and doubles draws | (France) Maxime Hamou; 5–7, 6–3, 6–4 | (Serbia) Marko Tepavac | (Portugal) André Gaspar Murta (Argentina) Tomás Lipovšek Puches | (France) Romain Jouan (France) Hugo Nys (Réunion) César Testoni (France) Sébastien Boltz |
| July 25 | France F16 Futures; Ajaccio, France; Hard $25,000; Singles and doubles draws | (Monaco) Romain Arneodo (France) Hugo Nys; 7–5, 6–2 | (France) Romain Jouan (France) Joan Soler | (Portugal) André Gaspar Murta (Argentina) Tomás Lipovšek Puches | (France) Romain Jouan (France) Hugo Nys (Réunion) César Testoni (France) Sébastien Boltz |
| July 25 | USA F25 Futures; Edwardsville, United States; Hard $25,000; Singles and doubles draws | (United States) Tennys Sandgren; 7–6^{(7–4)}, 1–6, 6–3 | (Australia) Marc Polmans | (Australia) Omar Jasika (United States) Evan King | (United States) Christian Harrison (United States) Emil Reinberg (Ecuador) Gonzalo Escobar (United States) Connor Smith |
| July 25 | USA F25 Futures; Edwardsville, United States; Hard $25,000; Singles and doubles draws | (United States) Connor Smith (United States) Jackson Withrow; 6–3, 6–2 | (United Kingdom) Luke Bambridge (Australia) Marc Polmans | (Australia) Omar Jasika (United States) Evan King | (United States) Christian Harrison (United States) Emil Reinberg (Ecuador) Gonzalo Escobar (United States) Connor Smith |
| July 25 | Austria F4 Futures; Wels, Austria; Clay $10,000; Singles and doubles draws | (Germany) Robin Kern; 6–4, 6–0 | (Austria) Lenny Hampel | (Austria) Sebastian Ofner (Portugal) Gonçalo Oliveira | (Slovenia) Tom Kočevar-Dešman (Slovenia) Nik Razboršek (Germany) Rudolf Molleker (Germany) Tobias Simon |
| July 25 | Austria F4 Futures; Wels, Austria; Clay $10,000; Singles and doubles draws | (Austria) Sebastian Bader (Portugal) Gonçalo Oliveira; 7–5, 6–3 | (Austria) Lenny Hampel (Austria) David Pichler | (Austria) Sebastian Ofner (Portugal) Gonçalo Oliveira | (Slovenia) Tom Kočevar-Dešman (Slovenia) Nik Razboršek (Germany) Rudolf Molleker (Germany) Tobias Simon |
| July 25 | Belgium F7 Futures; Duinbergen, Belgium; Clay $10,000; Singles and doubles draws | (France) Maxime Chazal; 7–5, 2–6, 6–2 | (Switzerland) Sandro Ehrat | (Belgium) Omar Salman (Norway) Casper Ruud | (Belgium) Jeroen Vanneste (Belgium) Sander Gillé (Belgium) Michael Geerts (France) Matteo Martineau |
| July 25 | Belgium F7 Futures; Duinbergen, Belgium; Clay $10,000; Singles and doubles draws | (Belgium) Sander Gillé (Belgium) Joran Vliegen; 6–7^{(4–7)}, 6–3, [10–4] | (Belgium) Michael Geerts (Belgium) Jeroen Vanneste | (Belgium) Omar Salman (Norway) Casper Ruud | (Belgium) Jeroen Vanneste (Belgium) Sander Gillé (Belgium) Michael Geerts (France) Matteo Martineau |
| July 25 | Egypt F17 Futures; Sharm El Sheikh, Egypt; Hard $10,000; Singles and doubles draws | (Italy) Lorenzo Frigerio; 6–1, 7–6^{(8–6)} | (Italy) Andrea Vavassori | (Australia) Bradley Mousley (United States) Adam El Mihdawy | (Spain) José Francisco Vidal Azorín (Serbia) Željko Milović (Egypt) Karim Hossam (Ukraine) Olexiy Kolisnyk |
| July 25 | Egypt F17 Futures; Sharm El Sheikh, Egypt; Hard $10,000; Singles and doubles draws | (Czech Republic) Marek Jaloviec (Australia) Bradley Mousley; 2–6, 6–3, [10–4] | (Italy) Lorenzo Frigerio (Italy) Andrea Vavassori | (Australia) Bradley Mousley (United States) Adam El Mihdawy | (Spain) José Francisco Vidal Azorín (Serbia) Željko Milović (Egypt) Karim Hossam (Ukraine) Olexiy Kolisnyk |
| July 25 | Estonia F1 Futures; Pärnu, Estonia; Clay $10,000; Singles and doubles draws | (Latvia) Miķelis Lībietis; 7–6^{(8–6)}, 7–6^{(8–6)} | (Italy) Alberto Brizzi | (Lithuania) Laurynas Grigelis (Finland) Patrik Niklas-Salminen | (Estonia) Vladimir Ivanov (Italy) Claudio Fortuna (Poland) Yann Wójcik (Argentina) Nicolás Alberto Arreche |
| July 25 | Estonia F1 Futures; Pärnu, Estonia; Clay $10,000; Singles and doubles draws | (Poland) Michał Dembek (Poland) Jan Zieliński; 7–5, 7–5 | (Russia) Vladimir Polyakov (Russia) Evgenii Tiurnev | (Lithuania) Laurynas Grigelis (Finland) Patrik Niklas-Salminen | (Estonia) Vladimir Ivanov (Italy) Claudio Fortuna (Poland) Yann Wójcik (Argentina) Nicolás Alberto Arreche |
| July 25 | Georgia F1 Futures; Telavi, Georgia; Clay $10,000; Singles and doubles draws | (Russia) Ilya Vasilyev; 2–6, 7–5, 6–3 | (Russia) Ilya Lebedev | (Russia) Victor Baluda (Lithuania) Lukas Mugevičius | (Russia) Anton Galkin (Turkey) Anıl Yüksel (France) Baptiste Crepatte (France) Jordan Ubiergo |
| July 25 | Georgia F1 Futures; Telavi, Georgia; Clay $10,000; Singles and doubles draws | (Hungary) Gábor Borsos (Lithuania) Lukas Mugevičius; 6–2, 2–6, [10–7] | (Russia) Victor Baluda (Russia) Ilya Vasilyev | (Russia) Victor Baluda (Lithuania) Lukas Mugevičius | (Russia) Anton Galkin (Turkey) Anıl Yüksel (France) Baptiste Crepatte (France) Jordan Ubiergo |
| July 25 | Italy F22 Futures; Pontedera, Italy; Clay $10,000; Singles and doubles draws | (Italy) Andrea Basso; 7–5, 6–3 | (Italy) Omar Giacalone | (Italy) Davide Galoppini (Italy) Antonio Massara | (Italy) Daniele Capecchi (Italy) Riccardo Sinicropi (Italy) Francesco Moncagatto (Italy) Marco Bortolotti |
| July 25 | Italy F22 Futures; Pontedera, Italy; Clay $10,000; Singles and doubles draws | (Uruguay) Marcel Felder (Italy) Antonio Massara; 6–4, 6–1 | (Italy) Alessandro Colella (Italy) Giacomo Miccini | (Italy) Davide Galoppini (Italy) Antonio Massara | (Italy) Daniele Capecchi (Italy) Riccardo Sinicropi (Italy) Francesco Moncagatto (Italy) Marco Bortolotti |
| July 25 | Morocco F4 Futures; Nador, Morocco; Clay $10,000; Singles and doubles draws | (Morocco) Reda El Amrani; 6–3, 6–3 | (Tunisia) Mohamed Aziz Dougaz | (Morocco) Amine Ahouda (Russia) Alexander Zhurbin | (Netherlands) Lennert van der Linden (Morocco) Mehdi Jdi (Morocco) Yassine Idmbarek (Tunisia) Skander Mansouri |
| July 25 | Morocco F4 Futures; Nador, Morocco; Clay $10,000; Singles and doubles draws | (Tunisia) Mohamed Aziz Dougaz (Tunisia) Skander Mansouri; 6–3, 6–4 | (Spain) Alejandro García Sáez (Spain) Daniel Monedero-González | (Morocco) Amine Ahouda (Russia) Alexander Zhurbin | (Netherlands) Lennert van der Linden (Morocco) Mehdi Jdi (Morocco) Yassine Idmbarek (Tunisia) Skander Mansouri |
| July 25 | Portugal F10 Futures; Castelo Branco, Portugal; Hard $10,000; Singles and doubles draws | (United Kingdom) Jonny O'Mara; 3–6, 7–5, 7–6^{(7–2)} | (Italy) Julian Ocleppo | (Denmark) Benjamin Hannestad (United Kingdom) Richard Gabb | (Portugal) João Domingues (Portugal) Nuno Borges (United Kingdom) Jay Clarke (Spain) Borja Rodríguez Manzano |
| July 25 | Portugal F10 Futures; Castelo Branco, Portugal; Hard $10,000; Singles and doubles draws | (Portugal) Felipe Cunha e Silva (Portugal) Frederico Gil; 1–6, 6–4, [12–10] | (United Kingdom) Scott Clayton (United Kingdom) Jonny O'Mara | (Denmark) Benjamin Hannestad (United Kingdom) Richard Gabb | (Portugal) João Domingues (Portugal) Nuno Borges (United Kingdom) Jay Clarke (Spain) Borja Rodríguez Manzano |
| July 25 | Romania F10 Futures; Cluj-Napoca, Romania; Clay $10,000; Singles and doubles draws | (Romania) Nicolae Frunză; 6–1, 6–4 | (Romania) Andrei Ștefan Apostol | (Romania) Dragoș Dima (Ukraine) Vladyslav Manafov | (France) Ronan Joncour (Italy) Nicola Ghedin (Romania) Răzvan Bobleaga (Italy) Matteo Tinelli |
| July 25 | Romania F10 Futures; Cluj-Napoca, Romania; Clay $10,000; Singles and doubles draws | (Romania) Victor-Mugurel Anagnastopol (Romania) Victor Vlad Cornea; 6–4, 6–2 | (France) Ronan Joncour (Ukraine) Vladyslav Manafov | (Romania) Dragoș Dima (Ukraine) Vladyslav Manafov | (France) Ronan Joncour (Italy) Nicola Ghedin (Romania) Răzvan Bobleaga (Italy) Matteo Tinelli |
| July 25 | Serbia F2 Futures; Sombor, Serbia; Clay $10,000; Singles and doubles draws | (Croatia) Kristijan Mesaroš; 6–3, 3–6, 6–3 | (Montenegro) Ljubomir Čelebić | (Hungary) Viktor Filipenkó (Poland) Paweł Ciaś | (Serbia) Miomir Kecmanović (Bosnia and Herzegovina) Nerman Fatić (Serbia) Dejan Katić (Switzerland) Johan Nikles |
| July 25 | Serbia F2 Futures; Sombor, Serbia; Clay $10,000; Singles and doubles draws | (Montenegro) Ljubomir Čelebić (Bosnia and Herzegovina) Nerman Fatić; 1–6, 6–3, [10–6] | (Croatia) Domagoj Bilješko (Croatia) Borna Gojo | (Hungary) Viktor Filipenkó (Poland) Paweł Ciaś | (Serbia) Miomir Kecmanović (Bosnia and Herzegovina) Nerman Fatić (Serbia) Dejan Katić (Switzerland) Johan Nikles |
| July 25 | Slovakia F1 Futures; Trnava, Slovakia; Clay $10,000; Singles and doubles draws | (France) Corentin Denolly; 7–5, 7–6^{(7–2)} | (Slovakia) Patrik Fabian | (Ukraine) Danylo Kalenichenko (Ukraine) Filipp Kekercheni | (Czech Republic) Pavel Nejedlý (Poland) Andriej Kapaś (Poland) Maciej Rajski (Czech Republic) Dominik Kellovský |
| July 25 | Slovakia F1 Futures; Trnava, Slovakia; Clay $10,000; Singles and doubles draws | (Ukraine) Danylo Kalenichenko (Ukraine) Filipp Kekercheni; 6–0, 6–1 | (Slovakia) Karol Beck (Russia) Artem Dubrivnyy | (Ukraine) Danylo Kalenichenko (Ukraine) Filipp Kekercheni | (Czech Republic) Pavel Nejedlý (Poland) Andriej Kapaś (Poland) Maciej Rajski (Czech Republic) Dominik Kellovský |
| July 25 | Spain F23 Futures; Xàtiva, Spain; Clay $10,000; Singles and doubles draws | (Spain) Pedro Martínez; 2–6, 6–1, 6–4 | (Spain) Carlos Taberner | (Spain) Álvaro López San Martín (Spain) Albert Alcaraz Ivorra | (Spain) Alberto Barroso Campos (Spain) Alejandro Ibáñez Gallego (Spain) Juan Lizariturry (Spain) Alejandro Artuñedo |
| July 25 | Spain F23 Futures; Xàtiva, Spain; Clay $10,000; Singles and doubles draws | (Spain) Alberto Barroso Campos (Spain) Pedro Martínez; 6–4, 6–1 | (Spain) Francesc Aulina (Spain) Juan Lizariturry | (Spain) Álvaro López San Martín (Spain) Albert Alcaraz Ivorra | (Spain) Alberto Barroso Campos (Spain) Alejandro Ibáñez Gallego (Spain) Juan Lizariturry (Spain) Alejandro Artuñedo |
| July 25 | Vietnam F1 Futures; Thủ Dầu Một, Vietnam; Hard $10,000; Singles and doubles draws | (South Korea) Hong Seong-chan; 6–1, 6–2 | (India) Rishab Agarwal | (India) Sasikumar Mukund (Japan) Renta Tokuda | (Indonesia) Christopher Rungkat (Japan) Kento Takeuchi (Japan) Shintaro Imai (Japan) Gengo Kikuchi |
| July 25 | Vietnam F1 Futures; Thủ Dầu Một, Vietnam; Hard $10,000; Singles and doubles draws | (Indonesia) Christopher Rungkat (Indonesia) David Agung Susanto; 6–3, 6–1 | (Japan) Gengo Kikuchi (Japan) Shunrou Takeshima | (India) Sasikumar Mukund (Japan) Renta Tokuda | (Indonesia) Christopher Rungkat (Japan) Kento Takeuchi (Japan) Shintaro Imai (Japan) Gengo Kikuchi |

=== August ===
| Week of | Tournament | Winner | Runners-up | Semifinalists | Quarterfinalists |
|---|---|---|---|---|---|
| August 1 | Italy F23 Futures; Bolzano, Italy; Clay $25,000; Singles and doubles draws | (Dominican Republic) José Hernández-Fernández; 6–4, 6–4 | (Chile) Bastián Malla | (Italy) Jacopo Stefanini (Sweden) Christian Lindell | (Italy) Gian Marco Moroni (Brazil) Wilson Leite (Italy) Matteo Viola (Germany) Daniel Masur |
| August 1 | Italy F23 Futures; Bolzano, Italy; Clay $25,000; Singles and doubles draws | (United States) Cătălin-Ionuț Gârd (Philippines) Ruben Gonzales; 6–1, 6–0 | (Argentina) Juan Pablo Ficovich (Dominican Republic) José Hernández-Fernández | (Italy) Jacopo Stefanini (Sweden) Christian Lindell | (Italy) Gian Marco Moroni (Brazil) Wilson Leite (Italy) Matteo Viola (Germany) Daniel Masur |
| August 1 | USA F26 Futures; Decatur, United States; Hard $25,000; Singles and doubles draws | (Ecuador) Roberto Quiroz; 6–0, 3–6, 7–6^{(8–6)} | (Australia) Marc Polmans | (United States) Evan King (United States) Tennys Sandgren | (United States) Jared Hiltzik (Australia) Omar Jasika (Ecuador) Gonzalo Escobar (United States) Tom Fawcett |
| August 1 | USA F26 Futures; Decatur, United States; Hard $25,000; Singles and doubles draws | (United States) Jared Hiltzik (United States) Rhyne Williams; 6–0, 6–1 | (United States) Nathan Pasha (United States) Dane Webb | (United States) Evan King (United States) Tennys Sandgren | (United States) Jared Hiltzik (Australia) Omar Jasika (Ecuador) Gonzalo Escobar (United States) Tom Fawcett |
| August 1 | Belgium F8 Futures; Ostend, Belgium; Clay $10,000; Singles and doubles draws | (Germany) Mats Moraing; 3–6, 6–3, 6–4 | (France) Alexis Musialek | (Netherlands) Botic van de Zandschulp (Belgium) Jonas Merckx | (Belgium) Omar Salman (France) Romain Sichez (Belgium) Romain Barbosa (Belgium) Joran Vliegen |
| August 1 | Belgium F8 Futures; Ostend, Belgium; Clay $10,000; Singles and doubles draws | (Netherlands) Paul Monteban (Netherlands) Botic van de Zandschulp; 3–6, 7–5, [10–5] | (France) Evan Furness (France) Ugo Humbert | (Netherlands) Botic van de Zandschulp (Belgium) Jonas Merckx | (Belgium) Omar Salman (France) Romain Sichez (Belgium) Romain Barbosa (Belgium) Joran Vliegen |
| August 1 | Egypt F18 Futures; Sharm El Sheikh, Egypt; Hard $10,000; Singles and doubles draws | (Serbia) Nikola Milojević; 3–6, 6–3, 6–3 | (Australia) Bradley Mousley | (Czech Republic) Marek Jaloviec (United States) Adam El Mihdawy | (Italy) Lorenzo Frigerio (Poland) Mateusz Terczyński (Italy) Luca Pancaldi (Ukraine) Dymtro Badanov |
| August 1 | Egypt F18 Futures; Sharm El Sheikh, Egypt; Hard $10,000; Singles and doubles draws | (Czech Republic) Marek Jaloviec (Australia) Bradley Mousley; 6–1, 6–2 | (Italy) Luca Pancaldi (Italy) Andrea Vavassori | (Czech Republic) Marek Jaloviec (United States) Adam El Mihdawy | (Italy) Lorenzo Frigerio (Poland) Mateusz Terczyński (Italy) Luca Pancaldi (Ukraine) Dymtro Badanov |
| August 1 | Finland F1 Futures; Kaarina, Finland; Clay $10,000; Singles and doubles draws | (Norway) Casper Ruud; 6–3, 4–6, 6–0 | (Denmark) Mikael Torpegaard | (New Zealand) José Statham (Sweden) Jonathan Mridha | (United States) Winston Lin (Sweden) Daniel Appelgren (Russia) Aleksandr Vasilenko (United States) Thai-Son Kwiatkowski |
| August 1 | Finland F1 Futures; Kaarina, Finland; Clay $10,000; Singles and doubles draws | (Finland) Herkko Pöllänen (Denmark) Mikael Torpegaard; 6–7^{(4–7)}, 6–3, [10–6] | (United States) Thai-Son Kwiatkowski (New Zealand) José Statham | (New Zealand) José Statham (Sweden) Jonathan Mridha | (United States) Winston Lin (Sweden) Daniel Appelgren (Russia) Aleksandr Vasilenko (United States) Thai-Son Kwiatkowski |
| August 1 | Georgia F2 Futures; Telavi, Georgia; Clay $10,000; Singles and doubles draws | (Ukraine) Oleksandr Bielinskyi; 6–4, 6–2 | (Lithuania) Lukas Mugevičius | (United Kingdom) Dan Dowson (Russia) Kristian Lozan | (Australia) Thomas Fancutt (Russia) Victor Baluda (Russia) Savva Polukhin (Russia) Ilya Vasilyev |
| August 1 | Georgia F2 Futures; Telavi, Georgia; Clay $10,000; Singles and doubles draws | (Australia) Thomas Fancutt (Australia) Mitchell William Robins; 4–6, 7–6^{(7–5)}, [10–8] | (Hungary) Gábor Borsos (Lithuania) Lukas Mugevičius | (United Kingdom) Dan Dowson (Russia) Kristian Lozan | (Australia) Thomas Fancutt (Russia) Victor Baluda (Russia) Savva Polukhin (Russia) Ilya Vasilyev |
| August 1 | Germany F9 Futures; Essen, Germany; Clay $10,000; Singles and doubles draws | (Germany) Peter Torebko; 6–2, 6–1 | (Germany) Yannick Maden | (Dominican Republic) Roberto Cid Subervi (Japan) Naoki Nakagawa | (Georgia (country)) Aleksandre Metreveli (Poland) Grzegorz Panfil (Germany) Marvin Netuschil (Germany) Johann Willems |
| August 1 | Germany F9 Futures; Essen, Germany; Clay $10,000; Singles and doubles draws | (Australia) Steven de Waard (Germany) Andreas Mies; 7–5, 6–4 | (Netherlands) Michiel de Krom (Netherlands) Bart Stevens | (Dominican Republic) Roberto Cid Subervi (Japan) Naoki Nakagawa | (Georgia (country)) Aleksandre Metreveli (Poland) Grzegorz Panfil (Germany) Marvin Netuschil (Germany) Johann Willems |
| August 1 | Latvia F1 Futures; Jūrmala, Latvia; Clay $10,000; Singles and doubles draws | (Lithuania) Laurynas Grigelis; 6–4, 7–5 | (Latvia) Miķelis Lībietis | (Russia) Evgenii Tiurnev (Netherlands) Tallon Griekspoor | (Russia) Alexander Zhurbin (Ukraine) Daniil Zarichanskyy (Italy) Claudio Fortuna (Switzerland) Riccardo Maiga |
| August 1 | Latvia F1 Futures; Jūrmala, Latvia; Clay $10,000; Singles and doubles draws | (United Kingdom) Jonathan Gray (United Kingdom) Ewan Moore; 2–6, 6–4, [10–8] | (Italy) Claudio Fortuna (Lithuania) Laurynas Grigelis | (Russia) Evgenii Tiurnev (Netherlands) Tallon Griekspoor | (Russia) Alexander Zhurbin (Ukraine) Daniil Zarichanskyy (Italy) Claudio Fortuna (Switzerland) Riccardo Maiga |
| August 1 | Morocco F5 Futures; Tangier, Morocco; Clay $10,000; Singles and doubles draws | (Morocco) Reda El Amrani; 6–3, 6–2 | (Egypt) Sherif Sabry | (France) Jules Okala (France) Gianni Mina | (Morocco) Mehdi Jdi (Argentina) Franco Emanuel Egea (Spain) Jaume Pla Malfeito (Spain) David Vega Hernández |
| August 1 | Morocco F5 Futures; Tangier, Morocco; Clay $10,000; Singles and doubles draws | (Belgium) Sander Gillé (France) Antoine Hoang; 6–4, 7–6^{(9–7)} | (France) Gianni Mina (France) Alexandre Müller | (France) Jules Okala (France) Gianni Mina | (Morocco) Mehdi Jdi (Argentina) Franco Emanuel Egea (Spain) Jaume Pla Malfeito (Spain) David Vega Hernández |
| August 1 | Romania F11 Futures; Pitești, Romania; Clay $10,000; Singles and doubles draws | (Romania) Nicolae Frunză; 6–3, 6–0 | (Romania) Dragoș Dima | (Ukraine) Vladyslav Manafov (France) François-Arthur Vibert | (Romania) Alexandru Jecan (Romania) Victor Vlad Cornea (Romania) Vasile Antonescu (France) Ronan Joncour |
| August 1 | Romania F11 Futures; Pitești, Romania; Clay $10,000; Singles and doubles draws | (Romania) Patrick Grigoriu (Ukraine) Vladyslav Manafov; 4–6, 7–5, [10–8] | (Romania) Vasile Antonescu (Romania) Alexandru Jecan | (Ukraine) Vladyslav Manafov (France) François-Arthur Vibert | (Romania) Alexandru Jecan (Romania) Victor Vlad Cornea (Romania) Vasile Antonescu (France) Ronan Joncour |
| August 1 | Russia F4 Futures; Kazan, Russia; Clay $10,000; Singles and doubles draws | (Russia) Alexander Igoshin; 6–2, 6–4 | (Russia) Aleksandr Lobkov | (Russia) Vitaly Kozyukov (Russia) Ivan Davydov | (Chile) Simón Navarro (Russia) Mikhail Fufygin (Russia) Denis Klok (Estonia) Vladimir Ivanov |
| August 1 | Russia F4 Futures; Kazan, Russia; Clay $10,000; Singles and doubles draws | (Russia) Mikhail Fufygin (Russia) Denis Matsukevich; 6–4, 6–0 | (Russia) Alexander Igoshin (Russia) Yan Sabanin | (Russia) Vitaly Kozyukov (Russia) Ivan Davydov | (Chile) Simón Navarro (Russia) Mikhail Fufygin (Russia) Denis Klok (Estonia) Vladimir Ivanov |
| August 1 | Serbia F3 Futures; Novi Sad, Serbia; Clay $10,000; Singles and doubles draws | (Croatia) Kristijan Mesaroš; 7–5, 6–3 | (Austria) Michael Linzer | (Italy) Antonio Massara (Australia) Christopher O'Connell | (Serbia) Petar Čonkić (Australia) Nicholas Horton (Hungary) André Biró (Serbia) Miomir Kecmanović |
| August 1 | Serbia F3 Futures; Novi Sad, Serbia; Clay $10,000; Singles and doubles draws | (Croatia) Domagoj Bilješko (Serbia) Dejan Katić; 2–6, 6–3, [10–6] | (Australia) Jeremy Beale (Australia) Nicholas Horton | (Italy) Antonio Massara (Australia) Christopher O'Connell | (Serbia) Petar Čonkić (Australia) Nicholas Horton (Hungary) André Biró (Serbia) Miomir Kecmanović |
| August 1 | Slovakia F2 Futures; Piešťany, Slovakia; Clay $10,000; Singles and doubles draws | (Belarus) Uladzimir Ignatik; 6–0, 6–1 | (Czech Republic) Pavel Nejedlý | (Czech Republic) Petr Michnev (Canada) Martin Beran | (Ukraine) Filipp Kekercheni (France) Corentin Denolly (Portugal) Gonçalo Oliveira (Slovakia) Patrik Néma |
| August 1 | Slovakia F2 Futures; Piešťany, Slovakia; Clay $10,000; Singles and doubles draws | (Ukraine) Danylo Kalenichenko (Austria) David Pichler; 6–2, 6–0 | (Canada) Martin Beran (Australia) Scott Puodziunas | (Czech Republic) Petr Michnev (Canada) Martin Beran | (Ukraine) Filipp Kekercheni (France) Corentin Denolly (Portugal) Gonçalo Oliveira (Slovakia) Patrik Néma |
| August 1 | Spain F24 Futures; Béjar, Spain; Hard $10,000+H; Singles and doubles draws | (Spain) Andrés Artuñedo; 6–2, 7–6^{(7–4)} | (Belgium) Yannick Mertens | (Norway) Viktor Durasovic (Portugal) Frederico Gil | (Spain) Javier Pulgar-García (France) Hugo Nys (Germany) Sami Reinwein (Australia) Alex de Minaur |
| August 1 | Spain F24 Futures; Béjar, Spain; Hard $10,000+H; Singles and doubles draws | (Belgium) Yannick Mertens (France) Hugo Nys; 6–4, 7–6^{(7–3)} | (United States) Alexander Centenari (Germany) Sami Reinwein | (Norway) Viktor Durasovic (Portugal) Frederico Gil | (Spain) Javier Pulgar-García (France) Hugo Nys (Germany) Sami Reinwein (Australia) Alex de Minaur |
| August 1 | Vietnam F2 Futures; Thủ Dầu Một, Vietnam; Hard $10,000; Singles and doubles draws | (Japan) Yusuke Takahashi; 6–4, 6–1 | (Indonesia) Christopher Rungkat | (Japan) Jumpei Yamasaki (France) Antoine Escoffier | (South Korea) Hong Seong-chan (France) Maxime Tabatruong (Japan) Masato Shiga (India) Sasikumar Mukund |
| August 1 | Vietnam F2 Futures; Thủ Dầu Một, Vietnam; Hard $10,000; Singles and doubles draws | (Thailand) Pruchya Isaro (Indonesia) Christopher Rungkat; 7–5, 6–2 | (Japan) Shintaro Imai (Japan) Arata Onozawa | (Japan) Jumpei Yamasaki (France) Antoine Escoffier | (South Korea) Hong Seong-chan (France) Maxime Tabatruong (Japan) Masato Shiga (India) Sasikumar Mukund |
| August 8 | Italy F24 Futures; Cornaiano, Italy; Clay $25,000+H; Singles and doubles draws | (Germany) Jeremy Jahn; 6–3, 6–2 | (Germany) Yannick Hanfmann | (Dominican Republic) José Hernández-Fernández (Italy) Adelchi Virgili | (Italy) Federico Gaio (Brazil) Marcelo Zormann (France) Jonathan Eysseric (Czech Republic) Zdeněk Kolář |
| August 8 | Italy F24 Futures; Cornaiano, Italy; Clay $25,000+H; Singles and doubles draws | (France) Jonathan Eysseric (Dominican Republic) José Hernández-Fernández; 7–6^{(7–2)}, 2–6, [10–4] | (Czech Republic) Zdeněk Kolář (Chile) Bastián Malla | (Dominican Republic) José Hernández-Fernández (Italy) Adelchi Virgili | (Italy) Federico Gaio (Brazil) Marcelo Zormann (France) Jonathan Eysseric (Czech Republic) Zdeněk Kolář |
| August 8 | Romania F12 Futures; Iași, Romania; Clay $25,000; Singles and doubles draws | (Romania) Dragoș Dima; 6–2, 3–0, ret. | (Argentina) Hernán Casanova | (Sweden) Dragoș Nicolae Mădăraș (France) Maxime Chazal | (Italy) Eros Siringo (Germany) Peter Torebko (Romania) Petru-Alexandru Luncanu (Egypt) Karim-Mohamed Maamoun |
| August 8 | Romania F12 Futures; Iași, Romania; Clay $25,000; Singles and doubles draws | (Romania) Victor-Mugurel Anagnastopol (Romania) Victor Vlad Cornea; 6–1, 3–6, [10–6] | (Romania) Petru-Alexandru Luncanu (Ukraine) Vladyslav Manafov | (Sweden) Dragoș Nicolae Mădăraș (France) Maxime Chazal | (Italy) Eros Siringo (Germany) Peter Torebko (Romania) Petru-Alexandru Luncanu (Egypt) Karim-Mohamed Maamoun |
| August 8 | USA F27 Futures; Champaign, United States; Hard $25,000; Singles and doubles draws | (United States) Christian Harrison; 6–7^{(2–7)}, 6–3, 6–4 | (United States) Rhyne Williams | (United States) Wil Spencer (United States) Jared Hiltzik | (United States) Strong Kirchheimer (Germany) Dominik Köpfer (Zimbabwe) Takanyi Garanganga (United States) Sameer Kumar |
| August 8 | USA F27 Futures; Champaign, United States; Hard $25,000; Singles and doubles draws | (United States) Jared Hiltzik (Germany) Dominik Köpfer; 3–6, 6–3, [11–9] | (United States) Tim Kopinski (United States) Alex Lawson | (United States) Wil Spencer (United States) Jared Hiltzik | (United States) Strong Kirchheimer (Germany) Dominik Köpfer (Zimbabwe) Takanyi Garanganga (United States) Sameer Kumar |
| August 8 | Austria F5 Futures; Innsbruck, Austria; Clay $10,000; Singles and doubles draws | (Austria) Sebastian Ofner; 6–2, 6–3 | (Portugal) Gonçalo Oliveira | (Croatia) Mate Delić (Germany) Dominik Böhler | (Austria) Patrick Ofner (Austria) Lenny Hampel (Italy) Gian Marco Moroni (Austria) Philipp Schroll |
| August 8 | Austria F5 Futures; Innsbruck, Austria; Clay $10,000; Singles and doubles draws | (United States) Dusty Boyer (Germany) Lukas Ollert; 6–2, 6–3 | (Croatia) Duje Delić (Croatia) Mate Delić | (Croatia) Mate Delić (Germany) Dominik Böhler | (Austria) Patrick Ofner (Austria) Lenny Hampel (Italy) Gian Marco Moroni (Austria) Philipp Schroll |
| August 8 | Belarus F1 Futures; Minsk, Belarus; Hard $10,000; Singles and doubles draws | (Belarus) Yaraslav Shyla; 6–4, 6–1 | (Belarus) Dzmitry Zhyrmont | (Belarus) Artur Dubinski (Bulgaria) Vasko Mladenov | (Kazakhstan) Roman Khassanov (Uzbekistan) Temur Ismailov (Ukraine) Marat Deviatiarov (Russia) Markos Kalovelonis |
| August 8 | Belarus F1 Futures; Minsk, Belarus; Hard $10,000; Singles and doubles draws | (Belarus) Yaraslav Shyla (Belarus) Dzmitry Zhyrmont; 7–6^{(10–8)}, 6–3 | (Russia) Markos Kalovelonis (Bulgaria) Vasko Mladenov | (Belarus) Artur Dubinski (Bulgaria) Vasko Mladenov | (Kazakhstan) Roman Khassanov (Uzbekistan) Temur Ismailov (Ukraine) Marat Deviatiarov (Russia) Markos Kalovelonis |
| August 8 | Belgium F9 Futures; Eupen, Belgium; Clay $10,000; Singles and doubles draws | (Spain) Jaume Munar; 7–6^{(7–5)}, 6–2 | (Germany) Mats Moraing | (France) Antoine Hoang (Belgium) Jolan Cailleau | (Belgium) Yannick Vandenbulcke (Belgium) Seppe Cuypers (Germany) Daniel Altmaier (Belgium) Michael Geerts |
| August 8 | Belgium F9 Futures; Eupen, Belgium; Clay $10,000; Singles and doubles draws | (France) Antoine Hoang (Germany) Tom Schönenberg; 6–4, 6–3 | (Netherlands) Roy Sarut de Valk (Netherlands) Jelle Sels | (France) Antoine Hoang (Belgium) Jolan Cailleau | (Belgium) Yannick Vandenbulcke (Belgium) Seppe Cuypers (Germany) Daniel Altmaier (Belgium) Michael Geerts |
| August 8 | Egypt F19 Futures; Sharm El Sheikh, Egypt; Hard $10,000; Singles and doubles draws | (Czech Republic) Marek Jaloviec; 7–6^{(7–3)}, 7–6^{(16–14)} | (United States) Adam El Mihdawy | (Australia) Bradley Mousley (Italy) Riccardo Bonadio | (Serbia) Nikola Milojević (Italy) Francesco Vilardo (United Kingdom) Farris Fathi Gosea (Czech Republic) Tomáš Papík |
| August 8 | Egypt F19 Futures; Sharm El Sheikh, Egypt; Hard $10,000; Singles and doubles draws | (Italy) Luca Pancaldi (Italy) Andrea Vavassori; 6–7^{(5–7)}, 7–6^{(12–10)}, [10–6] | (Czech Republic) Marek Jaloviec (Czech Republic) Tomáš Papík | (Australia) Bradley Mousley (Italy) Riccardo Bonadio | (Serbia) Nikola Milojević (Italy) Francesco Vilardo (United Kingdom) Farris Fathi Gosea (Czech Republic) Tomáš Papík |
| August 8 | Finland F2 Futures; Hyvinkää, Finland; Clay $10,000; Singles and doubles draws | (Russia) Ivan Nedelko; 6–1, 4–6, 7–6^{(8–6)} | (Netherlands) Tallon Griekspoor | (Sweden) Patrik Rosenholm (United States) Thai-Son Kwiatkowski | (Sweden) Daniel Appelgren (Japan) Ryusei Makiguchi (Netherlands) Kevin Griekspoor (Russia) Aleksandr Vasilenko |
| August 8 | Finland F2 Futures; Hyvinkää, Finland; Clay $10,000; Singles and doubles draws | (Sweden) Daniel Appelgren (Sweden) Patrik Rosenholm; 6–1, 6–1 | (Estonia) Markus Kerner (United States) Robbie Mudge | (Sweden) Patrik Rosenholm (United States) Thai-Son Kwiatkowski | (Sweden) Daniel Appelgren (Japan) Ryusei Makiguchi (Netherlands) Kevin Griekspoor (Russia) Aleksandr Vasilenko |
| August 8 | Georgia F3 Futures; Telavi, Georgia; Clay $10,000; Singles and doubles draws | (Lithuania) Lukas Mugevičius; 6–3, 6–2 | (Russia) Ilya Vasilyev | (Brazil) Caio Silva (Georgia (country)) George Tsivadze | (Croatia) Borna Gojo (Germany) Frederik Press (Italy) Luca Tomasetto (Italy) Fabrizio Ornago |
| August 8 | Georgia F3 Futures; Telavi, Georgia; Clay $10,000; Singles and doubles draws | (Australia) Thomas Fancutt (Australia) Mitchell William Robins; 4–6, 6–3, [13–11] | (Uzbekistan) Shonigmatjon Shofayziyev (Georgia (country)) George Tsivadze | (Brazil) Caio Silva (Georgia (country)) George Tsivadze | (Croatia) Borna Gojo (Germany) Frederik Press (Italy) Luca Tomasetto (Italy) Fabrizio Ornago |
| August 8 | Germany F10 Futures; Wetzlar, Germany; Clay $10,000; Singles and doubles draws | (Germany) Marvin Netuschil; 3–6, 7–6^{(8–6)}, 6–4 | (Dominican Republic) Roberto Cid Subervi | (Germany) Jan Choinski (Germany) Johannes Härteis | (Germany) Jean-Marc Werner (Australia) Maverick Banes (Germany) Julian Lenz (Germany) Jonas Lütjen |
| August 8 | Germany F10 Futures; Wetzlar, Germany; Clay $10,000; Singles and doubles draws | (Germany) Jannis Kahlke (Germany) Robin Kern; 6–0, 6–2 | (Dominican Republic) Roberto Cid Subervi (Japan) Naoki Nakagawa | (Germany) Jan Choinski (Germany) Johannes Härteis | (Germany) Jean-Marc Werner (Australia) Maverick Banes (Germany) Julian Lenz (Germany) Jonas Lütjen |
| August 8 | Morocco F6 Futures; Tangier, Morocco; Clay $10,000; Singles and doubles draws | (France) Maxime Hamou; 6–3, 4–6, 6–2 | (France) Alexandre Müller | (France) Gianni Mina (Argentina) Franco Emanuel Egea | (France) Manuel Guinard (France) Jules Okala (Italy) Julian Ocleppo (Portugal) Felipe Cunha e Silva |
| August 8 | Morocco F6 Futures; Tangier, Morocco; Clay $10,000; Singles and doubles draws | (Portugal) Felipe Cunha e Silva (Italy) Julian Ocleppo; 6–3, 6–3 | (France) Gianni Mina (France) Alexandre Müller | (France) Gianni Mina (Argentina) Franco Emanuel Egea | (France) Manuel Guinard (France) Jules Okala (Italy) Julian Ocleppo (Portugal) Felipe Cunha e Silva |
| August 8 | Russia F5 Futures; Moscow, Russia; Clay $10,000; Singles and doubles draws | (Russia) Evgenii Tiurnev; 7–5, 6–4 | (Estonia) Vladimir Ivanov | (Russia) Ivan Gakhov (Argentina) Matías Zukas | (Russia) Yan Sabanin (Russia) Alexander Igoshin (Russia) Maxim Ratniuk (Russia) Vitaly Kozyukov |
| August 8 | Russia F5 Futures; Moscow, Russia; Clay $10,000; Singles and doubles draws | (Chile) Cristóbal Saavedra (Chile) Ricardo Urzúa Rivera; 6–3, 6–3 | (Estonia) Vladimir Ivanov (Argentina) Matías Zukas | (Russia) Ivan Gakhov (Argentina) Matías Zukas | (Russia) Yan Sabanin (Russia) Alexander Igoshin (Russia) Maxim Ratniuk (Russia) Vitaly Kozyukov |
| August 8 | Serbia F4 Futures; Novi Sad, Serbia; Clay $10,000; Singles and doubles draws | (Australia) Christopher O'Connell; 7–6^{(8–6)}, 6–4 | (Italy) Stefano Travaglia | (Austria) Michael Linzer (Serbia) Nikola Ćaćić | (Montenegro) Ljubomir Čelebić (Bosnia and Herzegovina) Nerman Fatić (Serbia) Milan Drinić (Italy) Filippo Leonardi |
| August 8 | Serbia F4 Futures; Novi Sad, Serbia; Clay $10,000; Singles and doubles draws | (Germany) Christian Hirschmüller (Serbia) Luka Ilić; 5–7, 6–2, [11–9] | (Hungary) Viktor Filipenkó (Croatia) Antun Vidak | (Austria) Michael Linzer (Serbia) Nikola Ćaćić | (Montenegro) Ljubomir Čelebić (Bosnia and Herzegovina) Nerman Fatić (Serbia) Milan Drinić (Italy) Filippo Leonardi |
| August 8 | Slovakia F3 Futures; Slovenská Ľupča, Slovakia; Clay $10,000; Singles and doubles draws | (Czech Republic) Petr Michnev; 7–5, 6–2 | (France) Grégoire Jacq | (Austria) Gibril Diarra (Czech Republic) Pavel Nejedlý | (Czech Republic) Václav Šafránek (Czech Republic) Jaroslav Pospíšil (France) Valentin Vacherot (Slovakia) Ivan Kosec |
| August 8 | Slovakia F3 Futures; Slovenská Ľupča, Slovakia; Clay $10,000; Singles and doubles draws | (France) Grégoire Jacq (Slovenia) Nik Razboršek; 6–1, 6–4 | (Czech Republic) Petr Michnev (Czech Republic) Pavel Nejedlý | (Austria) Gibril Diarra (Czech Republic) Pavel Nejedlý | (Czech Republic) Václav Šafránek (Czech Republic) Jaroslav Pospíšil (France) Valentin Vacherot (Slovakia) Ivan Kosec |
| August 8 | Spain F25 Futures; Ourense, Spain; Hard $10,000; Singles and doubles draws | (Spain) Andrés Artuñedo; 6–3, 6–2 | (Norway) Viktor Durasovic | (France) Benjamin Bonzi (Russia) Alen Avidzba | (Australia) Alex de Minaur (Croatia) Fran Zvonimir Zgombić (Japan) Yusuke Watanuki (Spain) Alejandro Davidovich Fokina |
| August 8 | Spain F25 Futures; Ourense, Spain; Hard $10,000; Singles and doubles draws | (United States) Robert Galloway (United States) Dennis Uspensky; 6–4, 6–1 | (Japan) Ryota Kishi (Japan) Yusuke Watanuki | (France) Benjamin Bonzi (Russia) Alen Avidzba | (Australia) Alex de Minaur (Croatia) Fran Zvonimir Zgombić (Japan) Yusuke Watanuki (Spain) Alejandro Davidovich Fokina |
| August 8 | Vietnam F3 Futures; Thủ Dầu Một, Vietnam; Hard $10,000; Singles and doubles draws | (South Korea) Hong Seong-chan; 6–1, 6–7^{(4–7)}, 6–0 | (Australia) Jacob Grills | (France) Jonathan Kanar (Indonesia) David Agung Susanto | (Japan) Yuichi Ito (Japan) Takuto Niki (Thailand) Jirat Navasirisomboon (Japan) Sora Fukuda |
| August 8 | Vietnam F3 Futures; Thủ Dầu Một, Vietnam; Hard $10,000; Singles and doubles draws | (Thailand) Pruchya Isaro (Thailand) Kittipong Wachiramanowong; 6–3, 6–2 | (Japan) Hiroki Kondo (Japan) Jumpei Yamasaki | (France) Jonathan Kanar (Indonesia) David Agung Susanto | (Japan) Yuichi Ito (Japan) Takuto Niki (Thailand) Jirat Navasirisomboon (Japan) Sora Fukuda |
| August 15 | Italy F25 Futures; Padua, Italy; Clay $25,000; Singles and doubles draws | (France) Maxime Chazal; 6–4, 6–7^{(10–12)}, 7–5 | (Austria) Michael Linzer | (France) Jonathan Eysseric (Italy) Francisco Bahamonde | (Russia) Kirill Kivattsev (Chile) Bastián Malla (Italy) Matteo Viola (Dominican Republic) José Hernández-Fernández |
| August 15 | Italy F25 Futures; Padua, Italy; Clay $25,000; Singles and doubles draws | (France) Jonathan Eysseric (Italy) Matteo Viola; 4–6, 6–1, [10–8] | (Italy) Francisco Bahamonde (Uruguay) Marcel Felder | (France) Jonathan Eysseric (Italy) Francisco Bahamonde | (Russia) Kirill Kivattsev (Chile) Bastián Malla (Italy) Matteo Viola (Dominican Republic) José Hernández-Fernández |
| August 15 | Poland F5 Futures; Bydgoszcz, Poland; Clay $25,000; Singles and doubles draws | (France) Maxime Janvier; 6–3, 6–3 | (Poland) Andriej Kapaś | (Poland) Michał Przysiężny (Poland) Hubert Hurkacz | (Poland) Paweł Ciaś (Egypt) Karim-Mohamed Maamoun (Austria) Maximilian Neuchrist (Poland) Grzegorz Panfil |
| August 15 | Poland F5 Futures; Bydgoszcz, Poland; Clay $25,000; Singles and doubles draws | (Austria) Maximilian Neuchrist (Netherlands) David Pel; 6–1, 7–5 | (Poland) Michał Dembek (Poland) Grzegorz Panfil | (Poland) Michał Przysiężny (Poland) Hubert Hurkacz | (Poland) Paweł Ciaś (Egypt) Karim-Mohamed Maamoun (Austria) Maximilian Neuchrist (Poland) Grzegorz Panfil |
| August 15 | Austria F6 Futures; Vogau, Austria; Clay $10,000; Singles and doubles draws | (Bolivia) Hugo Dellien; 6–4, 2–6, 6–2 | (Italy) Omar Giacalone | (Austria) Bernd Kossler (Austria) Sebastian Ofner | (France) Johan Tatlot (Austria) Lenny Hampel (France) Corentin Denolly (United Kingdom) Neil Pauffley |
| August 15 | Austria F6 Futures; Vogau, Austria; Clay $10,000; Singles and doubles draws | (Bolivia) Hugo Dellien (Bolivia) Federico Zeballos; 7–5, 6–4 | (Austria) Lenny Hampel (Austria) Sebastian Ofner | (Austria) Bernd Kossler (Austria) Sebastian Ofner | (France) Johan Tatlot (Austria) Lenny Hampel (France) Corentin Denolly (United Kingdom) Neil Pauffley |
| August 15 | Belarus F2 Futures; Minsk, Belarus; Hard $10,000; Singles and doubles draws | (Belarus) Yaraslav Shyla; 6–4, 7–5 | (Belarus) Dzmitry Zhyrmont | (Uzbekistan) Sanjar Fayziev (Ukraine) Denys Mylokostov | (Turkey) Anıl Yüksel (Russia) Markos Kalovelonis (Ukraine) Marat Deviatiarov (Belarus) Maxim Tybar |
| August 15 | Belarus F2 Futures; Minsk, Belarus; Hard $10,000; Singles and doubles draws | (Belarus) Yaraslav Shyla (Belarus) Dzmitry Zhyrmont; 7–5, 7–6^{(7–1)} | (United Kingdom) Scott Clayton (United Kingdom) Jonny O'Mara | (Uzbekistan) Sanjar Fayziev (Ukraine) Denys Mylokostov | (Turkey) Anıl Yüksel (Russia) Markos Kalovelonis (Ukraine) Marat Deviatiarov (Belarus) Maxim Tybar |
| August 15 | Belgium F10 Futures; Koksijde, Belgium; Clay $10,000; Singles and doubles draws | (Netherlands) Tallon Griekspoor; 7–5, 7–6^{(7–4)} | (France) Thomas Bréchemier | (Germany) Yannick Maden (Belgium) Yannick Vandenbulcke | (Germany) Marvin Netuschil (Belgium) Jonas Merckx (Belgium) Romain Barbosa (Belgium) Michael Geerts |
| August 15 | Belgium F10 Futures; Koksijde, Belgium; Clay $10,000; Singles and doubles draws | (Belgium) Romain Barbosa (Belgium) Omar Salman; 7–5, 6–7^{(3–7)}, [10–8] | (Belgium) Jolan Cailleau (United States) Carlos di Laura | (Germany) Yannick Maden (Belgium) Yannick Vandenbulcke | (Germany) Marvin Netuschil (Belgium) Jonas Merckx (Belgium) Romain Barbosa (Belgium) Michael Geerts |
| August 15 | Egypt F20 Futures; Sharm El Sheikh, Egypt; Hard $10,000; Singles and doubles draws | (Italy) Riccardo Bonadio; 6–7^{(2–7)}, 7–5, 6–3 | (Czech Republic) Tomáš Papík | (Czech Republic) Marek Jaloviec (Italy) Francesco Vilardo | (Czech Republic) Michal Konečný (Australia) Bradley Mousley (Egypt) Issam Haitham Taweel (Ukraine) Dmytro Kovalevych |
| August 15 | Egypt F20 Futures; Sharm El Sheikh, Egypt; Hard $10,000; Singles and doubles draws | (Australia) Nathan Eshmade (Australia) Bradley Mousley; 6–1, 6–0 | (United Kingdom) Imran Aswat (Peru) Alexander Merino | (Czech Republic) Marek Jaloviec (Italy) Francesco Vilardo | (Czech Republic) Michal Konečný (Australia) Bradley Mousley (Egypt) Issam Haitham Taweel (Ukraine) Dmytro Kovalevych |
| August 15 | Finland F3 Futures; Helsinki, Finland; Clay $10,000; Singles and doubles draws | (Denmark) Mikael Torpegaard; 6–0, 7–5 | (Austria) Peter Goldsteiner | (Finland) Max Wennakoski (Israel) Ben Patael | (Sweden) Patrik Rosenholm (Peru) Mauricio Echazú (Finland) Eero Vasa (Germany) George von Massow |
| August 15 | Finland F3 Futures; Helsinki, Finland; Clay $10,000; Singles and doubles draws | (Finland) Herkko Pöllänen (Denmark) Mikael Torpegaard; 7–6^{(7–5)}, 6–3 | (Sweden) Daniel Appelgren (Sweden) Patrik Rosenholm | (Finland) Max Wennakoski (Israel) Ben Patael | (Sweden) Patrik Rosenholm (Peru) Mauricio Echazú (Finland) Eero Vasa (Germany) George von Massow |
| August 15 | Germany F11 Futures; Karlsruhe, Germany; Clay $10,000; Singles and doubles draws | (Spain) Marc Giner; 2–6, 6–1, 6–3 | (Germany) Yannick Hanfmann | (Germany) Andreas Beck (Dominican Republic) Roberto Cid Subervi | (Germany) Dominik Böhler (Germany) Johannes Härteis (Germany) Bastian Wagner (Germany) Sebastian Fanselow |
| August 15 | Germany F11 Futures; Karlsruhe, Germany; Clay $10,000; Singles and doubles draws | (Germany) Johannes Härteis (Germany) Hannes Wagner; 6–3, 7–5 | (Dominican Republic) Roberto Cid Subervi (Japan) Naoki Nakagawa | (Germany) Andreas Beck (Dominican Republic) Roberto Cid Subervi | (Germany) Dominik Böhler (Germany) Johannes Härteis (Germany) Bastian Wagner (Germany) Sebastian Fanselow |
| August 15 | Indonesia F1 Futures; Jakarta, Indonesia; Hard $10,000; Singles and doubles draws | (Indonesia) Christopher Rungkat; 6–0, 6–1 | (Hong Kong) Wong Hong Kit | (Germany) Sami Reinwein (Chinese Taipei) Yu Cheng-yu | (China) Te Rigele (Mexico) Luis Patiño (Japan) Kento Takeuchi (China) Cui Jie |
| August 15 | Indonesia F1 Futures; Jakarta, Indonesia; Hard $10,000; Singles and doubles draws | (Chinese Taipei) Huang Liang-chi (China) Wang Aoran; 6–3, 4–6, [12–10] | (India) Sriram Balaji (India) Vishnu Vardhan | (Germany) Sami Reinwein (Chinese Taipei) Yu Cheng-yu | (China) Te Rigele (Mexico) Luis Patiño (Japan) Kento Takeuchi (China) Cui Jie |
| August 15 | Netherlands F5 Futures; Oldenzaal, Netherlands; Clay $10,000; Singles and doubles draws | (Germany) Timon Reichelt; 7–6^{(10–8)}, 6–7^{(5–7)}, 6–1 | (Netherlands) Gijs Brouwer | (Netherlands) Botic van de Zandschulp (Turkey) Altuğ Çelikbilek | (Chile) Laslo Urrutia Fuentes (Netherlands) Bart Stevens (Germany) Vincent Jänsch-Müller (Netherlands) Colin van Beem |
| August 15 | Netherlands F5 Futures; Oldenzaal, Netherlands; Clay $10,000; Singles and doubles draws | (Turkey) Altuğ Çelikbilek (Netherlands) Niels Lootsma; 6–3, 6–3 | (France) Benjamin Bonzi (France) Antoine Hoang | (Netherlands) Botic van de Zandschulp (Turkey) Altuğ Çelikbilek | (Chile) Laslo Urrutia Fuentes (Netherlands) Bart Stevens (Germany) Vincent Jänsch-Müller (Netherlands) Colin van Beem |
| August 15 | Romania F13 Futures; Mediaș, Romania; Clay $10,000; Singles and doubles draws | (Netherlands) Miliaan Niesten; 6–7^{(3–7)}, 6–2, 7–6^{(7–4)} | (Chile) Nicolás Jarry | (Romania) Teodor-Dacian Crăciun (Romania) Bogdan Borza | (Portugal) Felipe Cunha e Silva (Romania) Alexandru Jecan (Israel) Mor Bulis (Romania) Vasile Antonescu |
| August 15 | Romania F13 Futures; Mediaș, Romania; Clay $10,000; Singles and doubles draws | (Chile) Nicolás Jarry (Chile) Simón Navarro; 6–3, 6–4 | (Romania) Victor-Mugurel Anagnastopol (Romania) Victor Vlad Cornea | (Romania) Teodor-Dacian Crăciun (Romania) Bogdan Borza | (Portugal) Felipe Cunha e Silva (Romania) Alexandru Jecan (Israel) Mor Bulis (Romania) Vasile Antonescu |
| August 15 | Russia F6 Futures; Moscow, Russia; Clay $10,000; Singles and doubles draws | (Russia) Ivan Gakhov; 1–6, 6–3, 6–3 | (Russia) Denis Matsukevich | (Chile) Ricardo Urzúa-Rivera (Russia) Evgeny Karlovskiy | (Russia) Ivan Nedelko (Russia) Alexander Ovcharov (Russia) Alexander Igoshin (Russia) Vitaly Kozyukov |
| August 15 | Russia F6 Futures; Moscow, Russia; Clay $10,000; Singles and doubles draws | (Russia) Evgeny Karlovskiy (Russia) Denis Matsukevich; 6–3, 2–6, [10–8] | (Estonia) Vladimir Ivanov (Argentina) Matías Zukas | (Chile) Ricardo Urzúa-Rivera (Russia) Evgeny Karlovskiy | (Russia) Ivan Nedelko (Russia) Alexander Ovcharov (Russia) Alexander Igoshin (Russia) Vitaly Kozyukov |
| August 15 | Serbia F5 Futures; Subotica, Serbia; Clay $10,000; Singles and doubles draws | (Bosnia and Herzegovina) Tomislav Brkić; 6–4, 6–2 | (Montenegro) Ljubomir Čelebić | (Italy) Stefano Travaglia (Croatia) Mate Delić | (Serbia) Dejan Katić (Serbia) Petar Čonkić (Japan) Shunsuke Wakita (Austria) Thomas Statzberger |
| August 15 | Serbia F5 Futures; Subotica, Serbia; Clay $10,000; Singles and doubles draws | (Hungary) Levente Gödry (Hungary) Dávid Szintai; 6–3, 6–4 | (Serbia) Goran Marković (Croatia) Antun Vidak | (Italy) Stefano Travaglia (Croatia) Mate Delić | (Serbia) Dejan Katić (Serbia) Petar Čonkić (Japan) Shunsuke Wakita (Austria) Thomas Statzberger |
| August 15 | Slovakia F4 Futures; Bratislava, Slovakia; Clay $10,000; Singles and doubles draws | (Czech Republic) Václav Šafránek; 7–6^{(8–6)}, 6–1 | (Czech Republic) Vít Kopřiva | (Austria) Jurij Rodionov (Austria) David Pichler | (Slovakia) Patrik Néma (Germany) Julian Onken (Slovakia) David Juras (Slovakia) Peter Vajda |
| August 15 | Slovakia F4 Futures; Bratislava, Slovakia; Clay $10,000; Singles and doubles draws | (Slovakia) Patrik Fabian (Czech Republic) Dominik Kellovský; 6–7^{(3–7)}, 6–1, [10–7] | (Czech Republic) Filip Doležel (Czech Republic) Václav Šafránek | (Austria) Jurij Rodionov (Austria) David Pichler | (Slovakia) Patrik Néma (Germany) Julian Onken (Slovakia) David Juras (Slovakia) Peter Vajda |
| August 15 | Spain F26 Futures; Vigo, Spain; Clay $10,000; Singles and doubles draws | (Spain) Bernabé Zapata Miralles; 6–3, 6–3 | (Italy) Alberto Brizzi | (Portugal) João Monteiro (Spain) Jaume Pla Malfeito | (Spain) Javier Martí (Spain) Aitor Sanz Llopis (Spain) Pol Toledo Bagué (Spain) Marc Fornell |
| August 15 | Spain F26 Futures; Vigo, Spain; Clay $10,000; Singles and doubles draws | (Spain) Javier Barranco Cosano (Italy) Raúl Brancaccio; 7–5, 6–4 | (Spain) Álvaro López San Martín (Spain) Jaume Pla Malfeito | (Portugal) João Monteiro (Spain) Jaume Pla Malfeito | (Spain) Javier Martí (Spain) Aitor Sanz Llopis (Spain) Pol Toledo Bagué (Spain) Marc Fornell |
| August 15 | Switzerland F3 Futures; Collonge-Bellerive, Switzerland; Clay $10,000; Singles and doubles draws | (Germany) Tobias Simon; 6–3, 6–4 | (France) Laurent Lokoli | (Germany) Lukas Ollert (Portugal) Gonçalo Oliveira | (Switzerland) Marc-Andrea Hüsler (Switzerland) Antoine Bellier (Switzerland) Riccardo Maiga (Switzerland) Mirko Martinez |
| August 15 | Switzerland F3 Futures; Collonge-Bellerive, Switzerland; Clay $10,000; Singles and doubles draws | (Portugal) Gonçalo Oliveira (France) Fabien Reboul; 6–3, 7–5 | (Switzerland) Antoine Bellier (France) Hugo Nys | (Germany) Lukas Ollert (Portugal) Gonçalo Oliveira | (Switzerland) Marc-Andrea Hüsler (Switzerland) Antoine Bellier (Switzerland) Riccardo Maiga (Switzerland) Mirko Martinez |
| August 22 | Poland F6 Futures; Poznań, Poland; Clay $25,000; Singles and doubles draws | (India) Sumit Nagal; 6–4, 1–6, 6–3 | (Germany) Daniel Masur | (France) Maxime Janvier (Netherlands) David Pel | (Poland) Adam Majchrowicz (Brazil) Orlando Luz (Poland) Andriej Kapaś (Austria) Maximilian Neuchrist |
| August 22 | Poland F6 Futures; Poznań, Poland; Clay $25,000; Singles and doubles draws | (Poland) Marcin Gawron (Poland) Andriej Kapaś; 6–4, 7–5 | (Poland) Adam Majchrowicz (Poland) Szymon Walków | (France) Maxime Janvier (Netherlands) David Pel | (Poland) Adam Majchrowicz (Brazil) Orlando Luz (Poland) Andriej Kapaś (Austria) Maximilian Neuchrist |
| August 22 | Austria F7 Futures; Pörtschach, Austria; Clay $10,000; Singles and doubles draws | (Czech Republic) Petr Michnev; 4–6, 6–2, 6–4 | (France) Corentin Denolly | (Hungary) Péter Nagy (Germany) Kevin Krawietz | (Italy) Matteo Viola (Croatia) Nino Serdarušić (Italy) Pietro Licciardi (Italy) Omar Giacalone |
| August 22 | Austria F7 Futures; Pörtschach, Austria; Clay $10,000; Singles and doubles draws | (Bolivia) Hugo Dellien (Bolivia) Federico Zeballos; 6–3, 6–0 | (Hungary) Péter Nagy (Slovenia) Nik Razboršek | (Hungary) Péter Nagy (Germany) Kevin Krawietz | (Italy) Matteo Viola (Croatia) Nino Serdarušić (Italy) Pietro Licciardi (Italy) Omar Giacalone |
| August 22 | Belarus F3 Futures; Minsk, Belarus; Hard $10,000; Singles and doubles draws | (Belarus) Dzmitry Zhyrmont; 6–4, 6–2 | (Turkey) Anıl Yüksel | (Russia) Markos Kalovelonis (Belarus) Sergey Betov | (Belarus) Andrei Vasilevski (Bulgaria) Vasko Mladenov (Kazakhstan) Denis Yevseyev (Ukraine) Denys Mylokostov |
| August 22 | Belarus F3 Futures; Minsk, Belarus; Hard $10,000; Singles and doubles draws | (United Kingdom) Scott Clayton (United Kingdom) Jonny O'Mara; 6–4, 3–6, [13–11] | (Georgia (country)) George Tsivadze (Turkey) Anıl Yüksel | (Russia) Markos Kalovelonis (Belarus) Sergey Betov | (Belarus) Andrei Vasilevski (Bulgaria) Vasko Mladenov (Kazakhstan) Denis Yevseyev (Ukraine) Denys Mylokostov |
| August 22 | Belgium F11 Futures; Huy, Belgium; Clay $10,000; Singles and doubles draws | (Belgium) Joran Vliegen; 6–4, 6–4 | (Belgium) Romain Barbosa | (Germany) Jakob Sude (Belgium) Yannick Vandenbulcke | (Belgium) Dennis Bogaert (Belgium) Omar Salman (United Kingdom) Tom Farquharson (Belgium) Maxime Authom |
| August 22 | Belgium F11 Futures; Huy, Belgium; Clay $10,000; Singles and doubles draws | (United Kingdom) Jarryd Bant (United Kingdom) Tom Farquharson; 6–3, 6–2 | (Belgium) Sander Gillé (Belgium) Joran Vliegen | (Germany) Jakob Sude (Belgium) Yannick Vandenbulcke | (Belgium) Dennis Bogaert (Belgium) Omar Salman (United Kingdom) Tom Farquharson (Belgium) Maxime Authom |
| August 22 | Egypt F21 Futures; Sharm El Sheikh, Egypt; Hard $10,000; Singles and doubles draws | (Russia) Roman Safiullin; 6–2, 6–1 | (Czech Republic) Michal Konečný | (Republic of Ireland) Sam Barry (Czech Republic) Marek Jaloviec | (Zimbabwe) Benjamin Lock (Australia) Stefan Skadarka (Portugal) Miguel Semedo (Japan) Hiroyasu Ehara |
| August 22 | Egypt F21 Futures; Sharm El Sheikh, Egypt; Hard $10,000; Singles and doubles draws | (Brazil) Pedro Bernardi (Guatemala) Christopher Díaz Figueroa; 7–6^{(7–4)}, 6–7^{(2–7)}, [10–7] | (Czech Republic) Michal Konečný (Russia) Roman Safiullin | (Republic of Ireland) Sam Barry (Czech Republic) Marek Jaloviec | (Zimbabwe) Benjamin Lock (Australia) Stefan Skadarka (Portugal) Miguel Semedo (Japan) Hiroyasu Ehara |
| August 22 | Germany F12 Futures; Überlingen, Germany; Clay $10,000; Singles and doubles draws | (Germany) Oscar Otte; 6–7^{(4–7)}, 6–2, 6–4 | (Bulgaria) Alexandar Lazov | (Germany) Peter Torebko (Germany) Louis Wessels | (Germany) Tobias Simon (Germany) Jean-Marc Werner (Germany) Julian Lenz (Switzerland) Adrian Bodmer |
| August 22 | Germany F12 Futures; Überlingen, Germany; Clay $10,000; Singles and doubles draws | (Germany) Oscar Otte (Germany) Tom Schönenberg; 6–1, 6–0 | (Peru) Mauricio Echazú (Bulgaria) Alexandar Lazov | (Germany) Peter Torebko (Germany) Louis Wessels | (Germany) Tobias Simon (Germany) Jean-Marc Werner (Germany) Julian Lenz (Switzerland) Adrian Bodmer |
| August 22 | Indonesia F2 Futures; Makassar, Indonesia; Hard $10,000; Singles and doubles draws | (Indonesia) Christopher Rungkat; 6–3, 3–6, 6–0 | (Mexico) Lucas Gómez | (Chinese Taipei) Yu Cheng-yu (Germany) Sami Reinwein | (Japan) Masato Shiga (India) Sasikumar Mukund (Japan) Soichiro Moritani (Japan) Kento Takeuchi |
| August 22 | Indonesia F2 Futures; Makassar, Indonesia; Hard $10,000; Singles and doubles draws | (Indonesia) Christopher Rungkat (Indonesia) David Agung Susanto; 6–1, 6–4 | (Chinese Taipei) Lin Wei-de (Chinese Taipei) Yu Cheng-yu | (Chinese Taipei) Yu Cheng-yu (Germany) Sami Reinwein | (Japan) Masato Shiga (India) Sasikumar Mukund (Japan) Soichiro Moritani (Japan) Kento Takeuchi |
| August 22 | Italy F26 Futures; Piombino, Italy; Hard $10,000; Singles and doubles draws | (Italy) Matteo Trevisan; 7–5, 6–4 | (France) Hugo Grenier | (Italy) Alessandro Bega (France) Yannick Jankovits | (Italy) Francesco Vilardo (United Kingdom) Edward Corrie (Denmark) Frederik Nielsen (Italy) Gianluca Di Nicola |
| August 22 | Italy F26 Futures; Piombino, Italy; Hard $10,000; Singles and doubles draws | (Italy) Jacopo Stefanini (Italy) Andrea Vavassori; 6–3, 6–4 | (France) Hugo Grenier (France) Yannick Jankovits | (Italy) Alessandro Bega (France) Yannick Jankovits | (Italy) Francesco Vilardo (United Kingdom) Edward Corrie (Denmark) Frederik Nielsen (Italy) Gianluca Di Nicola |
| August 22 | Korea F6 Futures; Anseong, Korea; Clay (indoor) $10,000; Singles and doubles draws | (South Korea) Nam Ji-sung; 5–7, 6–1, 6–1 | (Japan) Makoto Ochi | (South Korea) Kim Cheong-eui (South Korea) Kim Young-seok | (Japan) Sho Katayama (South Korea) Lim Yong-kyu (South Korea) Song Min-kyu (South Korea) Moon Ju-hae |
| August 22 | Korea F6 Futures; Anseong, Korea; Clay (indoor) $10,000; Singles and doubles draws | (South Korea) Lim Yong-kyu (South Korea) Seol Jae-min; 6–1, 7–6^{(7–4)} | (South Korea) Jun Woong-sun (South Korea) Nam Hyun-woo | (South Korea) Kim Cheong-eui (South Korea) Kim Young-seok | (Japan) Sho Katayama (South Korea) Lim Yong-kyu (South Korea) Song Min-kyu (South Korea) Moon Ju-hae |
| August 22 | Romania F14 Futures; Galați, Romania; Clay $10,000; Singles and doubles draws | (Chile) Nicolás Jarry; 6–3, 6–1 | (Argentina) Gabriel Alejandro Hidalgo | (Chile) Cristóbal Saavedra (United States) Mitchell Thomas McDaniels | (Bulgaria) Dimitar Kuzmanov (Ukraine) Vadim Alekseenko (Romania) Nicolae Frunză (Romania) Petru-Alexandru Luncanu |
| August 22 | Romania F14 Futures; Galați, Romania; Clay $10,000; Singles and doubles draws | (Argentina) Marino Kestelboim (Romania) Petru-Alexandru Luncanu; 6–4, 6–1 | (Romania) Andrei Ștefan Apostol (Romania) Nicolae Frunză | (Chile) Cristóbal Saavedra (United States) Mitchell Thomas McDaniels | (Bulgaria) Dimitar Kuzmanov (Ukraine) Vadim Alekseenko (Romania) Nicolae Frunză (Romania) Petru-Alexandru Luncanu |
| August 22 | Spain F27 Futures; Santander, Spain; Clay $10,000; Singles and doubles draws | (Spain) Álvaro López San Martín; 6–1, 6–1 | (Italy) Alberto Brizzi | (Spain) Alberto Romero de Ávila Senise (Spain) Nicola Kuhn | (Argentina) Gonzalo Villanueva (Venezuela) Ricardo Rodríguez (Spain) Jaume Pla Malfeito (Spain) Mario Vilella Martínez |
| August 22 | Spain F27 Futures; Santander, Spain; Clay $10,000; Singles and doubles draws | (Spain) Eduard Esteve Lobato (Spain) Álvaro López San Martín; 7–5, 6–4 | (Spain) Marc Fornell (Venezuela) Jordi Muñoz Abreu | (Spain) Alberto Romero de Ávila Senise (Spain) Nicola Kuhn | (Argentina) Gonzalo Villanueva (Venezuela) Ricardo Rodríguez (Spain) Jaume Pla Malfeito (Spain) Mario Vilella Martínez |
| August 22 | Switzerland F4 Futures; Lausanne, Switzerland; Clay $10,000; Singles and doubles draws | (Switzerland) Cristian Villagrán; 6–4, 6–7^{(6–8)}, 6–3 | (France) Laurent Lokoli | (Austria) Gibril Diarra (Argentina) Federico Coria | (France) Fabien Reboul (Switzerland) Johan Nikles (Portugal) Gonçalo Oliveira (Switzerland) Adrien Bossel |
| August 22 | Switzerland F4 Futures; Lausanne, Switzerland; Clay $10,000; Singles and doubles draws | (Portugal) Gonçalo Oliveira (France) Fabien Reboul; 7–5, 6–2 | (Argentina) Federico Coria (Switzerland) Louroi Martinez | (Austria) Gibril Diarra (Argentina) Federico Coria | (France) Fabien Reboul (Switzerland) Johan Nikles (Portugal) Gonçalo Oliveira (Switzerland) Adrien Bossel |
| August 22 | Thailand F1 Futures; Hua Hin, Thailand; Hard $10,000; Singles and doubles draws | (Chinese Taipei) Chen Ti; 6–3, 6–1 | (China) Sun Fajing | (India) Sriram Balaji (South Korea) Chung Yun-seong | (Japan) Issei Okamura (Brazil) Thales Turini (France) Antoine Escoffier (Thailand) Wishaya Trongcharoenchaikul |
| August 22 | Thailand F1 Futures; Hua Hin, Thailand; Hard $10,000; Singles and doubles draws | (Chinese Taipei) Chen Ti (United States) John Paul Fruttero; 6–2, 6–2 | (South Korea) Chung Yun-seong (China) Gao Xin | (India) Sriram Balaji (South Korea) Chung Yun-seong | (Japan) Issei Okamura (Brazil) Thales Turini (France) Antoine Escoffier (Thailand) Wishaya Trongcharoenchaikul |
| August 29 | Canada F6 Futures; Calgary, Canada; Hard $25,000; Singles and doubles draws | (Canada) Brayden Schnur; 6–3, 3–6, 6–3 | (Netherlands) Tim van Rijthoven | (Canada) Philip Bester (Greece) Stefanos Tsitsipas | (United States) Gonzales Austin (United States) Andrew Carter (Zimbabwe) Takanyi Garanganga (Canada) Filip Peliwo |
| August 29 | Canada F6 Futures; Calgary, Canada; Hard $25,000; Singles and doubles draws | (Greece) Stefanos Tsitsipas (Netherlands) Tim van Rijthoven; 6–4, 2–6, [13–11] | (Mexico) Hans Hach Verdugo (New Zealand) José Statham | (Canada) Philip Bester (Greece) Stefanos Tsitsipas | (United States) Gonzales Austin (United States) Andrew Carter (Zimbabwe) Takanyi Garanganga (Canada) Filip Peliwo |
| August 29 | Russia F7 Futures; Saint Petersburg, Russia; Hard (indoor) $25,000; Singles and doubles draws | (Russia) Evgenii Tiurnev; 6–4, 3–6, 6–3 | (Russia) Alexey Vatutin | (Russia) Aleksandr Lobkov (Russia) Mikhail Elgin | (Belarus) Egor Gerasimov (Ukraine) Marat Deviatiarov (Russia) Alexander Bublik (Belgium) Yannick Mertens |
| August 29 | Russia F7 Futures; Saint Petersburg, Russia; Hard (indoor) $25,000; Singles and doubles draws | (Russia) Evgeny Karlovskiy (Russia) Denis Matsukevich; 6–1, 6–2 | (Russia) Alexander Igoshin (Russia) Yan Sabanin | (Russia) Aleksandr Lobkov (Russia) Mikhail Elgin | (Belarus) Egor Gerasimov (Ukraine) Marat Deviatiarov (Russia) Alexander Bublik (Belgium) Yannick Mertens |
| August 29 | Austria F8 Futures; Sankt Pölten, Austria; Clay $10,000; Singles and doubles draws | (Austria) Sebastian Ofner; 7–5, 6–4 | (Italy) Riccardo Bellotti | (Austria) Lenny Hampel (Slovakia) Patrik Néma | (Czech Republic) Petr Michnev (Czech Republic) Vít Kopřiva (Austria) Dominic Weidinger (Poland) Marcin Gawron |
| August 29 | Austria F8 Futures; Sankt Pölten, Austria; Clay $10,000; Singles and doubles draws | (Austria) Lenny Hampel (Austria) Lucas Miedler; 6–3, 6–3 | (South Africa) Damon Gooch (Austria) Gregor Ramskogler | (Austria) Lenny Hampel (Slovakia) Patrik Néma | (Czech Republic) Petr Michnev (Czech Republic) Vít Kopřiva (Austria) Dominic Weidinger (Poland) Marcin Gawron |
| August 29 | Belgium F12 Futures; Middelkerke, Belgium; Clay $10,000; Singles and doubles draws | (France) Thomas Bréchemier; 7–5, 6–2 | (Belgium) Jeroen Vanneste | (Belgium) Sander Gillé (Belgium) Joran Vliegen | (Belgium) Arnaud Nevuex (Croatia) Franjo Raspudić (Norway) Viktor Durasovic (United Kingdom) Tom Farquharson |
| August 29 | Belgium F12 Futures; Middelkerke, Belgium; Clay $10,000; Singles and doubles draws | (Australia) Adam Taylor (Australia) Jason Taylor; 6–0, 6–2 | (United Kingdom) Billy Harris (Germany) Jakob Sude | (Belgium) Sander Gillé (Belgium) Joran Vliegen | (Belgium) Arnaud Nevuex (Croatia) Franjo Raspudić (Norway) Viktor Durasovic (United Kingdom) Tom Farquharson |
| August 29 | Egypt F22 Futures; Sharm El Sheikh, Egypt; Hard $10,000; Singles and doubles draws | (Egypt) Karim-Mohamed Maamoun; 6–3, 6–1 | (Tunisia) Anis Ghorbel | (Egypt) Issam Haitham Taweel (Republic of Ireland) Sam Barry | (Spain) David Pérez Sanz (Portugal) Bernardo Saraiva (France) Victor Ouvrard (Japan) Hiroyasu Ehara |
| August 29 | Egypt F22 Futures; Sharm El Sheikh, Egypt; Hard $10,000; Singles and doubles draws | (Venezuela) Jordi Muñoz Abreu (Spain) David Pérez Sanz; 7–6^{(7–4)}, 7–5 | (Brazil) Pedro Bernardi (Tunisia) Anis Ghorbel | (Egypt) Issam Haitham Taweel (Republic of Ireland) Sam Barry | (Spain) David Pérez Sanz (Portugal) Bernardo Saraiva (France) Victor Ouvrard (Japan) Hiroyasu Ehara |
| August 29 | Indonesia F3 Futures; Jakarta, Indonesia; Hard $10,000; Singles and doubles draws | (India) Sasikumar Mukund; 6–2, 6–2 | (Japan) Masato Shiga | (Indonesia) Christopher Rungkat (China) Wang Chuhan | (New Zealand) Finn Tearney (Japan) Soichiro Moritani (Indonesia) David Agung Susanto (Japan) Kento Takeuchi |
| August 29 | Indonesia F3 Futures; Jakarta, Indonesia; Hard $10,000; Singles and doubles draws | (Indonesia) Armando Soemarno (Indonesia) Sunu Wahyu Trijati; 6–0, 6–4 | (India) Kunal Anand (India) Anvit Bendre | (Indonesia) Christopher Rungkat (China) Wang Chuhan | (New Zealand) Finn Tearney (Japan) Soichiro Moritani (Indonesia) David Agung Susanto (Japan) Kento Takeuchi |
| August 29 | Italy F27 Futures; Trieste, Italy; Clay $10,000; Singles and doubles draws | (Hungary) Attila Balázs; 7–5, 6–4 | (Croatia) Kristijan Mesaroš | (Italy) Stefano Travaglia (Italy) Andrea Basso | (Austria) Michael Linzer (Chile) Marcelo Tomás Barrios Vera (Italy) Marco Bortolotti (Germany) Tobias Simon |
| August 29 | Italy F27 Futures; Trieste, Italy; Clay $10,000; Singles and doubles draws | (Italy) Matteo Berrettini (Italy) Jacopo Stefanini; 7–6^{(7–3)}, 6–3 | (Germany) Florian Fallert (Germany) Tobias Simon | (Italy) Stefano Travaglia (Italy) Andrea Basso | (Austria) Michael Linzer (Chile) Marcelo Tomás Barrios Vera (Italy) Marco Bortolotti (Germany) Tobias Simon |
| August 29 | Korea F7 Futures; Anseong, Korea; Clay (indoor) $10,000; Singles and doubles draws | (South Korea) Chung Hong; 6–3, 4–6, 6–4 | (South Korea) Cho Min-hyeok | (Japan) Makoto Ochi (South Korea) Kim Cheong-eui | (Japan) Arata Onozawa (South Korea) Jun Woong-sun (South Korea) Daniel Yoo (South Korea) Song Min-kyu |
| August 29 | Korea F7 Futures; Anseong, Korea; Clay (indoor) $10,000; Singles and doubles draws | (South Korea) Lim Yong-kyu (South Korea) Seol Jae-min; 6–3, 6–3 | (South Korea) Cho Min-hyeok (South Korea) Kim Hyun-joon | (Japan) Makoto Ochi (South Korea) Kim Cheong-eui | (Japan) Arata Onozawa (South Korea) Jun Woong-sun (South Korea) Daniel Yoo (South Korea) Song Min-kyu |
| August 29 | Netherlands F7 Futures; Schoonhoven, Netherlands; Clay $10,000; Singles and doubles draws | (Netherlands) Botic van de Zandschulp; Walkover | (Netherlands) Jesse Huta Galung | (Germany) Bastian Wagner (Netherlands) Lennert van der Linden | (Netherlands) Tim van Terheijden (France) Théo Fournerie (France) Maxime Tabatruong (Netherlands) Colin van Beem |
| August 29 | Netherlands F7 Futures; Schoonhoven, Netherlands; Clay $10,000; Singles and doubles draws | (Netherlands) Sidney de Boer (Netherlands) Niels Lootsma; 3–6, 7–5, [10–8] | (Netherlands) Jesse Huta Galung (Netherlands) Lennert van der Linden | (Germany) Bastian Wagner (Netherlands) Lennert van der Linden | (Netherlands) Tim van Terheijden (France) Théo Fournerie (France) Maxime Tabatruong (Netherlands) Colin van Beem |
| August 29 | Romania F15 Futures; Brașov, Romania; Clay $10,000; Singles and doubles draws | (Lithuania) Laurynas Grigelis; 7–6^{(7–1)}, 6–2 | (Argentina) Gabriel Alejandro Hidalgo | (Italy) Claudio Fortuna (Sweden) Dragoș Nicolae Mădăraș | (Romania) Vasile Antonescu (Slovakia) Filip Horanský (Chile) Nicolás Jarry (Argentina) Tomás Gerini |
| August 29 | Romania F15 Futures; Brașov, Romania; Clay $10,000; Singles and doubles draws | (Romania) Victor-Mugurel Anagnastopol (Romania) Victor Vlad Cornea; 4–6, 7–6^{(8–6)}, [10–8] | (Romania) Vasile Antonescu (Romania) Alexandru Jecan | (Italy) Claudio Fortuna (Sweden) Dragoș Nicolae Mădăraș | (Romania) Vasile Antonescu (Slovakia) Filip Horanský (Chile) Nicolás Jarry (Argentina) Tomás Gerini |
| August 29 | Spain F28 Futures; San Sebastián, Spain; Clay $10,000; Singles and doubles draws | (Spain) Jaume Munar; 3–6, 7–5, 6–3 | (Argentina) Gonzalo Villanueva | (Spain) Albert Alcarraz Ivorra (Spain) Ricardo Ojeda Lara | (Spain) Oriol Roca Batalla (Spain) Pedro Martínez (Spain) Juan Lizariturry (Spain) Andrés Artuñedo |
| August 29 | Spain F28 Futures; San Sebastián, Spain; Clay $10,000; Singles and doubles draws | (Spain) Eduard Esteve Lobato (Spain) Pedro Martínez; 6–3, 3–6, [10–4] | (Benin) Alexis Klégou (France) Maxime Mora | (Spain) Albert Alcarraz Ivorra (Spain) Ricardo Ojeda Lara | (Spain) Oriol Roca Batalla (Spain) Pedro Martínez (Spain) Juan Lizariturry (Spain) Andrés Artuñedo |
| August 29 | Switzerland F5 Futures; Sion, Switzerland; Clay $10,000; Singles and doubles draws | (Switzerland) Johan Nikles; 4–6, 6–2, 6–1 | (Switzerland) Antoine Bellier | (Italy) Julian Ocleppo (Argentina) Federico Coria | (Argentina) Tomás Lipovšek Puches (Ukraine) Filipp Kekercheni (Portugal) Gonçalo Oliveira (Peru) Juan Pablo Varillas |
| August 29 | Switzerland F5 Futures; Sion, Switzerland; Clay $10,000; Singles and doubles draws | (Portugal) Gonçalo Oliveira (France) Fabien Reboul; 6–3, 6–3 | (Argentina) Federico Coria (Switzerland) Louroi Martinez | (Italy) Julian Ocleppo (Argentina) Federico Coria | (Argentina) Tomás Lipovšek Puches (Ukraine) Filipp Kekercheni (Portugal) Gonçalo Oliveira (Peru) Juan Pablo Varillas |
| August 29 | Thailand F2 Futures; Hua Hin, Thailand; Hard $10,000; Singles and doubles draws | (India) Sriram Balaji; 6–4, 7–6^{(7–3)} | (South Korea) Hong Seong-chan | (India) Vijay Sundar Prashanth (Chinese Taipei) Lee Kuan-yi | (Japan) Renta Tokuda (Japan) Yusuke Takahashi (Japan) Yuichi Ito (France) Antoine Escoffier |
| August 29 | Thailand F2 Futures; Hua Hin, Thailand; Hard $10,000; Singles and doubles draws | (India) Sriram Balaji (India) Vijay Sundar Prashanth; 6–2, 6–2 | (Thailand) Pruchya Isaro (Japan) Ken Onishi | (India) Vijay Sundar Prashanth (Chinese Taipei) Lee Kuan-yi | (Japan) Renta Tokuda (Japan) Yusuke Takahashi (Japan) Yuichi Ito (France) Antoine Escoffier |

=== September ===
| Week of | Tournament | Winner | Runners-up | Semifinalists | Quarterfinalists |
|---|---|---|---|---|---|
| September 5 | Belgium F13 Futures; Arlon, Belgium; Clay $25,000; Singles and doubles draws | (Germany) Yannick Maden; 6–4, 6–2 | (Germany) Marvin Netuschil | (France) Antoine Hoang (Ukraine) Filipp Kekercheni | (France) Alexis Musialek (France) Corentin Denolly (Belgium) Jonas Merckx (Belgium) Romain Barbosa |
| September 5 | Belgium F13 Futures; Arlon, Belgium; Clay $25,000; Singles and doubles draws | (France) Corentin Denolly (France) Antoine Hoang; 6–3, 6–4 | (Belgium) Michael Geerts (Belgium) Jeroen Vanneste | (France) Antoine Hoang (Ukraine) Filipp Kekercheni | (France) Alexis Musialek (France) Corentin Denolly (Belgium) Jonas Merckx (Belgium) Romain Barbosa |
| September 5 | Canada F7 Futures; Toronto, Canada; Clay $25,000; Singles and doubles draws | (Canada) Frank Dancevic; 7–6^{(7–5)}, 7–6^{(7–3)} | (Ecuador) Iván Endara | (Netherlands) Tim van Rijthoven (Switzerland) Alexander Ritschard | (United States) Rhyne Williams (New Zealand) José Statham (United States) Jonathan Chang (Canada) David Volfson |
| September 5 | Canada F7 Futures; Toronto, Canada; Clay $25,000; Singles and doubles draws | (Mexico) Hans Hach Verdugo (United States) Rhyne Williams; 7–5, 6–4 | (United States) Hunter Reese (United States) Jackson Withrow | (Netherlands) Tim van Rijthoven (Switzerland) Alexander Ritschard | (United States) Rhyne Williams (New Zealand) José Statham (United States) Jonathan Chang (Canada) David Volfson |
| September 5 | France F17 Futures; Bagnères-de-Bigorre, France; Hard $25,000+H; Singles and doubles draws | (Belgium) Maxime Authom; 4–6, 7–6^{(11–9)}, 6–0 | (France) Hugo Nys | (United States) Peter Kobelt (Belgium) Julien Dubail | (France) Alexandre Sidorenko (France) Sébastien Boltz (France) Laurent Rochette (France) David Guez |
| September 5 | France F17 Futures; Bagnères-de-Bigorre, France; Hard $25,000+H; Singles and doubles draws | (Belgium) Maxime Authom (France) Laurent Rochette; 6–4, 2–6, [10–8] | (France) Mick Lescure (France) Alexandre Sidorenko | (United States) Peter Kobelt (Belgium) Julien Dubail | (France) Alexandre Sidorenko (France) Sébastien Boltz (France) Laurent Rochette (France) David Guez |
| September 5 | Russia F8 Futures; Saint Petersburg, Russia; Hard (indoor) $25,000; Singles and doubles draws | (Russia) Alexander Bublik; 6–3, 7–5 | (Russia) Aleksandr Vasilenko | (Belarus) Dzmitry Zhyrmont (Russia) Aleksandr Lobkov | (Russia) Alexander Igoshin (Russia) Evgeny Karlovskiy (Russia) Maxim Ratniuk (Ukraine) Marat Deviatiarov |
| September 5 | Russia F8 Futures; Saint Petersburg, Russia; Hard (indoor) $25,000; Singles and doubles draws | (Russia) Alexander Igoshin (Russia) Yan Sabanin; 6–3, 6–3 | (Russia) Ivan Davydov (Russia) Dmitry Mnushkin | (Belarus) Dzmitry Zhyrmont (Russia) Aleksandr Lobkov | (Russia) Alexander Igoshin (Russia) Evgeny Karlovskiy (Russia) Maxim Ratniuk (Ukraine) Marat Deviatiarov |
| September 5 | Spain F29 Futures; Oviedo, Spain; Clay $25,000; Singles and doubles draws | (Spain) Álvaro López San Martín; 7–5, 6–2 | (Spain) Albert Alcarraz Ivorra | (Spain) Alberto Romero de Ávila Senise (Spain) Miguel Semmler | (Spain) Javier Martí (Portugal) João Monteiro (Germany) Jean-Marc Werner (Russia) Ivan Gakhov |
| September 5 | Spain F29 Futures; Oviedo, Spain; Clay $25,000; Singles and doubles draws | (Spain) Eduard Esteve Lobato (Germany) Jean-Marc Werner; 6–1, 6–1 | (Spain) Marc Fornell (Portugal) Gonçalo Oliveira | (Spain) Alberto Romero de Ávila Senise (Spain) Miguel Semmler | (Spain) Javier Martí (Portugal) João Monteiro (Germany) Jean-Marc Werner (Russia) Ivan Gakhov |
| September 5 | Egypt F23 Futures; Sharm El Sheikh, Egypt; Hard $10,000; Singles and doubles draws | (Tunisia) Anis Ghorbel; 5–7, 6–2, 7–6^{(7–4)} | (Russia) Roman Safiullin | (Italy) Alessandro Bega (Egypt) Karim-Mohamed Maamoun | (Zimbabwe) Benjamin Lock (Ukraine) Dmytro Badanov (Portugal) Bernardo Saraiva (Argentina) Mateo Nicolás Martínez |
| September 5 | Egypt F23 Futures; Sharm El Sheikh, Egypt; Hard $10,000; Singles and doubles draws | (Brazil) Pedro Bernardi (Argentina) Mateo Nicolás Martínez; 7–6^{(7–4)}, 6–3 | (United States) Alex Lawson (Zimbabwe) Benjamin Lock | (Italy) Alessandro Bega (Egypt) Karim-Mohamed Maamoun | (Zimbabwe) Benjamin Lock (Ukraine) Dmytro Badanov (Portugal) Bernardo Saraiva (Argentina) Mateo Nicolás Martínez |
| September 5 | Hungary F4 Futures; Budapest, Hungary; Clay $10,000; Singles and doubles draws | (Hungary) Attila Balázs; 6–2, 6–2 | (Chile) Jorge Montero | (Slovenia) Tomislav Ternar (Hungary) Péter Nagy | (Slovakia) Filip Horanský (Slovakia) Peter Vajda (Austria) Dominic Weidinger (Hungary) Zsombor Piros |
| September 5 | Hungary F4 Futures; Budapest, Hungary; Clay $10,000; Singles and doubles draws | (Hungary) Gábor Borsos (Hungary) Ádám Kellner; 6–4, 1–6, [10–6] | (Hungary) Levente Gödry (Hungary) Péter Nagy | (Slovenia) Tomislav Ternar (Hungary) Péter Nagy | (Slovakia) Filip Horanský (Slovakia) Peter Vajda (Austria) Dominic Weidinger (Hungary) Zsombor Piros |
| September 5 | India F4 Futures; Chennai, India; Clay $10,000; Singles and doubles draws | (India) Prajnesh Gunneswaran; 3–6, 7–5, 7–6^{(7–3)} | (India) Sriram Balaji | (India) Sidharth Rawat (India) Sasikumar Mukund | (Brazil) Thales Turini (India) Vijay Sundar Prashanth (India) Mohit Mayur Jayaprakash (India) Sanam Singh |
| September 5 | India F4 Futures; Chennai, India; Clay $10,000; Singles and doubles draws | (India) Sriram Balaji (India) Vijay Sundar Prashanth; 7–6^{(7–2)}, 6–1 | (India) Kunal Anand (India) Anvit Bendre | (India) Sidharth Rawat (India) Sasikumar Mukund | (Brazil) Thales Turini (India) Vijay Sundar Prashanth (India) Mohit Mayur Jayaprakash (India) Sanam Singh |
| September 5 | Israel F11 Futures; Herzliya, Israel; Hard $10,000; Singles and doubles draws | (United States) Connor Smith; 7–6^{(8–6)}, 6–3 | (France) Yannick Jankovits | (Israel) Orel Ovil (United States) Evan Song | (Israel) Amit Gabreal (United States) Nathaniel Lammons (Israel) Daniel Cukierman (Italy) Francesco Vilardo |
| September 5 | Israel F11 Futures; Herzliya, Israel; Hard $10,000; Singles and doubles draws | (United States) Connor Smith (United States) Danny Thomas; 6–3, 6–4 | (United States) Nathaniel Lammons (United States) Dane Webb | (Israel) Orel Ovil (United States) Evan Song | (Israel) Amit Gabreal (United States) Nathaniel Lammons (Israel) Daniel Cukierman (Italy) Francesco Vilardo |
| September 5 | Italy F28 Futures; Reggio Emilia, Italy; Clay $10,000+H; Singles and doubles draws | (Italy) Stefano Travaglia; Walkover | (Italy) Matteo Berrettini | (India) Sumit Nagal (Italy) Marco Bortolotti | (France) Johan Tatlot (Italy) Luca Pancaldi (Italy) Andrea Pellegrino (Chile) Marcelo Tomás Barrios Vera |
| September 5 | Italy F28 Futures; Reggio Emilia, Italy; Clay $10,000+H; Singles and doubles draws | (Italy) Matteo Berrettini (Italy) Jacopo Stefanini; 6–3, 7–6^{(7–5)} | (Italy) Andrea Pellegrino (Italy) Andrea Vavassori | (India) Sumit Nagal (Italy) Marco Bortolotti | (France) Johan Tatlot (Italy) Luca Pancaldi (Italy) Andrea Pellegrino (Chile) Marcelo Tomás Barrios Vera |
| September 5 | Korea F8 Futures; Anseong, Korea; Clay (indoor) $10,000; Singles and doubles draws | (South Korea) Lim Yong-kyu; 6–0, 6–3 | (South Korea) Nam Ji-sung | (South Korea) Lee Jea-moon (South Korea) Song Min-kyu | (South Korea) Kim Cheong-eui (South Korea) Chung Hong (South Korea) Kim Young-seok (South Korea) Dylan Seong-kwan Kim |
| September 5 | Korea F8 Futures; Anseong, Korea; Clay (indoor) $10,000; Singles and doubles draws | (South Korea) Nam Ji-sung (South Korea) Song Min-kyu; 6–4, 6–4 | (Japan) Katsuki Nagao (Japan) Hiromasa Oku | (South Korea) Lee Jea-moon (South Korea) Song Min-kyu | (South Korea) Kim Cheong-eui (South Korea) Chung Hong (South Korea) Kim Young-seok (South Korea) Dylan Seong-kwan Kim |
| September 5 | Romania F16 Futures; Bucharest, Romania; Clay $10,000; Singles and doubles draws | (Lithuania) Laurynas Grigelis; 6–3, 4–6, 6–1 | (Italy) Claudio Fortuna | (Germany) Johann Willems (Uruguay) Santiago Maresca | (Romania) Sergiu Ioan Bucur (Romania) Bogdan Borza (Italy) Nicolò Turchetti (Chile) Cristóbal Saavedra |
| September 5 | Romania F16 Futures; Bucharest, Romania; Clay $10,000; Singles and doubles draws | (Romania) Vasile Antonescu (Romania) Alexandru Jecan; 6–2, 6–2 | (Romania) Andrei Ștefan Apostol (Romania) Nicolae Frunză | (Germany) Johann Willems (Uruguay) Santiago Maresca | (Romania) Sergiu Ioan Bucur (Romania) Bogdan Borza (Italy) Nicolò Turchetti (Chile) Cristóbal Saavedra |
| September 5 | Serbia F6 Futures; Zlatibor, Serbia; Clay $10,000; Singles and doubles draws | (Croatia) Kristijan Mesaroš; 6–4, 1–0, ret. | (Montenegro) Ljubomir Čelebić | (Bosnia and Herzegovina) Nerman Fatić (Croatia) Borna Gojo | (Croatia) Domagoj Bilješko (North Macedonia) Tomislav Jotovski (Germany) Christian Hirschmüller (Italy) Davide Galoppini |
| September 5 | Serbia F6 Futures; Zlatibor, Serbia; Clay $10,000; Singles and doubles draws | (Croatia) Domagoj Bilješko (Croatia) Borna Gojo; 6–1, 6–7^{(1–7)}, [11–9] | (Serbia) Goran Marković (Croatia) Antun Vidak | (Bosnia and Herzegovina) Nerman Fatić (Croatia) Borna Gojo | (Croatia) Domagoj Bilješko (North Macedonia) Tomislav Jotovski (Germany) Christian Hirschmüller (Italy) Davide Galoppini |
| September 5 | Thailand F3 Futures; Hua Hin, Thailand; Hard $10,000; Singles and doubles draws | (Japan) Yusuke Takahashi; 6–4, 6–0 | (Japan) Renta Tokuda | (Thailand) Wishaya Trongcharoenchaikul (Japan) Jumpei Yamasaki | (South Korea) Hong Seong-chan (China) Ouyang Bowen (South Korea) Chung Yun-seong (France) Antoine Escoffier |
| September 5 | Thailand F3 Futures; Hua Hin, Thailand; Hard $10,000; Singles and doubles draws | (Japan) Yuichi Ito (Japan) Jumpei Yamasaki; 6–3, 6–3 | (Thailand) Patcharapol Kawin (Thailand) Jirat Navasirisomboon | (Thailand) Wishaya Trongcharoenchaikul (Japan) Jumpei Yamasaki | (South Korea) Hong Seong-chan (China) Ouyang Bowen (South Korea) Chung Yun-seong (France) Antoine Escoffier |
| September 5 | Tunisia F22 Futures; Hammamet, Tunisia; Clay $10,000; Singles and doubles draws | (France) Jules Okala; 6–4, 6–3 | (France) Benjamin Bonzi | (Argentina) Franco Agamenone (Italy) Fabrizio Ornago | (Russia) Ivan Nedelko (France) Jordan Ubiergo (France) Lény Mitjana (France) Ronan Joncour |
| September 5 | Tunisia F22 Futures; Hammamet, Tunisia; Clay $10,000; Singles and doubles draws | (Argentina) Franco Agamenone (Argentina) Mariano Kestelboim; 6–2, 2–6, [10–7] | (France) Benjamin Bonzi (France) Fabien Reboul | (Argentina) Franco Agamenone (Italy) Fabrizio Ornago | (Russia) Ivan Nedelko (France) Jordan Ubiergo (France) Lény Mitjana (France) Ronan Joncour |
| September 12 | Canada F8 Futures; Toronto, Canada; Hard $25,000; Singles and doubles draws | (Canada) Filip Peliwo; 6–3, 6–4 | (United States) Rhyne Williams | (Canada) Benjamin Sigouin (United States) Winston Lin | (Japan) Kaichi Uchida (Zimbabwe) Takanyi Garanganga (Canada) Egor Koleganov (United States) Raleigh Smith |
| September 12 | Canada F8 Futures; Toronto, Canada; Hard $25,000; Singles and doubles draws | (Mexico) Hans Hach Verdugo (United States) Rhyne Williams; 6–3, 6–3 | (Bolivia) Juan Carlos Aguilar (Canada) Benjamin Sigouin | (Canada) Benjamin Sigouin (United States) Winston Lin | (Japan) Kaichi Uchida (Zimbabwe) Takanyi Garanganga (Canada) Egor Koleganov (United States) Raleigh Smith |
| September 12 | France F18 Futures; Mulhouse, France; Hard (indoor) $25,000+H; Singles and doubles draws | (France) Laurent Lokoli; 4–6, 6–2, 7–6^{(7–4)} | (United States) Raymond Sarmiento | (France) Albano Olivetti (Sweden) Patrik Rosenholm | (Republic of Ireland) Sam Barry (Germany) Andreas Beck (France) Romain Jouan (France) Joffrey de Schepper |
| September 12 | France F18 Futures; Mulhouse, France; Hard (indoor) $25,000+H; Singles and doubles draws | (Germany) Andreas Beck (France) Grégoire Jacq; 6–4, 6–3 | (Belgium) Maxime Authom (France) Hugo Nys | (France) Albano Olivetti (Sweden) Patrik Rosenholm | (Republic of Ireland) Sam Barry (Germany) Andreas Beck (France) Romain Jouan (France) Joffrey de Schepper |
| September 12 | Serbia F7 Futures; Niš, Serbia; Clay $25,000; Singles and doubles draws | (Italy) Lorenzo Giustino; 3–6, 6–2, 6–4 | (Croatia) Kristijan Mesaroš | (Bulgaria) Alexandar Lazarov (Croatia) Nino Serdarušić | (Italy) Davide Galoppini (Poland) Maciej Rajski (Serbia) Nebojša Perić (Germany) Pirmin Hänle |
| September 12 | Serbia F7 Futures; Niš, Serbia; Clay $25,000; Singles and doubles draws | (Chile) Cristóbal Saavedra (Chile) Ricardo Urzúa-Rivera; 6–4, 4–6, [10–8] | (Serbia) Luka Ilić (Serbia) Darko Jandrić | (Bulgaria) Alexandar Lazarov (Croatia) Nino Serdarušić | (Italy) Davide Galoppini (Poland) Maciej Rajski (Serbia) Nebojša Perić (Germany) Pirmin Hänle |
| September 12 | Belgium F14 Futures; Damme, Belgium; Clay $10,000; Singles and doubles draws | (Argentina) Juan Pablo Ficovich; 6–4, 4–6, 7–5 | (Germany) Marvin Netuschil | (France) Alexis Musialek (Germany) Oscar Otte | (Belgium) Michael Geerts (Belgium) Yannick Vandenbulcke (Germany) Pascal Meis (Germany) Daniel Altmaier |
| September 12 | Belgium F14 Futures; Damme, Belgium; Clay $10,000; Singles and doubles draws | (Germany) Daniel Altmaier (Germany) Marvin Netuschil; 6–2, 6–0 | (Germany) Oscar Otte (Germany) Tom Schönenberg | (France) Alexis Musialek (Germany) Oscar Otte | (Belgium) Michael Geerts (Belgium) Yannick Vandenbulcke (Germany) Pascal Meis (Germany) Daniel Altmaier |
| September 12 | Egypt F24 Futures; Cairo, Egypt; Clay $10,000; Singles and doubles draws | (Czech Republic) Jaroslav Pospíšil; 7–5, 6–4 | (Czech Republic) Vít Kopřiva | (Argentina) Gastón-Arturo Grimolizzi (Zimbabwe) Benjamin Lock | (Italy) Matteo Tinelli (Egypt) Mohamed Abdel-Aziz (Germany) Christoph Negritu (Bolivia) Federico Zeballos |
| September 12 | Egypt F24 Futures; Cairo, Egypt; Clay $10,000; Singles and doubles draws | (Argentina) Gastón-Arturo Grimolizzi (Argentina) Mateo Nicolás Martínez; 7–5, 6–4 | (India) Anirudh Chandrasekar (India) Vignesh Peranamallur | (Argentina) Gastón-Arturo Grimolizzi (Zimbabwe) Benjamin Lock | (Italy) Matteo Tinelli (Egypt) Mohamed Abdel-Aziz (Germany) Christoph Negritu (Bolivia) Federico Zeballos |
| September 12 | Hungary F5 Futures; Székesfehérvár, Hungary; Clay $10,000; Singles and doubles draws | (Hungary) Attila Balázs; 6–1, 6–3 | (Slovakia) Patrik Fabian | (Hungary) Máté Valkusz (Slovakia) Patrik Obal | (France) Johan Tatlot (Hungary) Péter Nagy (Slovenia) Nik Razboršek (Austria) Lucas Miedler |
| September 12 | Hungary F5 Futures; Székesfehérvár, Hungary; Clay $10,000; Singles and doubles draws | (Austria) Pascal Brunner (Austria) Lucas Miedler; 6–3, 3–6, [10–1] | (Hungary) Gábor Borsos (Hungary) Ádám Kellner | (Hungary) Máté Valkusz (Slovakia) Patrik Obal | (France) Johan Tatlot (Hungary) Péter Nagy (Slovenia) Nik Razboršek (Austria) Lucas Miedler |
| September 12 | India F5 Futures; Chennai, India; Hard $10,000; Singles and doubles draws | (India) Vishnu Vardhan; 6–4, 6–3 | (India) Sriram Balaji | (India) Sanam Singh (India) Vijay Sundar Prashanth | (India) Siddharth Vishwakarma (India) Niki Kaliyanda Poonacha (India) Rishab Agarwal (India) Vinayak Sharma Kaza |
| September 12 | India F5 Futures; Chennai, India; Hard $10,000; Singles and doubles draws | (India) Sriram Balaji (India) Vishnu Vardhan; 6–3, 6–4 | (India) Kunal Anand (India) Anvit Bendre | (India) Sanam Singh (India) Vijay Sundar Prashanth | (India) Siddharth Vishwakarma (India) Niki Kaliyanda Poonacha (India) Rishab Agarwal (India) Vinayak Sharma Kaza |
| September 12 | Israel F12 Futures; Ashkelon, Israel; Hard $10,000; Singles and doubles draws | (United States) Connor Smith; 6–1, 6–0 | (United Kingdom) Neil Pauffley | (United States) Nathaniel Lammons (United States) Evan Song | (Ukraine) Volodymyr Uzhylovskyi (Israel) Ben Patael (France) Jonathan Kanar (Israel) Daniel Cukierman |
| September 12 | Israel F12 Futures; Ashkelon, Israel; Hard $10,000; Singles and doubles draws | (United States) Connor Smith (United States) Danny Thomas; 6–0, 7–6^{(7–3)} | (United States) Nathaniel Lammons (United States) Dane Webb | (United States) Nathaniel Lammons (United States) Evan Song | (Ukraine) Volodymyr Uzhylovskyi (Israel) Ben Patael (France) Jonathan Kanar (Israel) Daniel Cukierman |
| September 12 | Italy F29 Futures; Pula, Italy; Clay $10,000; Singles and doubles draws | (Italy) Jacopo Stefanini; 6–2, 6–2 | (Argentina) Gabriel Alejandro Hidalgo | (Germany) Florian Fallert (Italy) Riccardo Bonadio | (Italy) Andrea Basso (Italy) Stefano Travaglia (Italy) Andrea Vavassori (Italy) Nicola Ghedin |
| September 12 | Italy F29 Futures; Pula, Italy; Clay $10,000; Singles and doubles draws | (Italy) Andrea Basso (Italy) Jacopo Stefanini; 6–1, 2–6, [10–6] | (Italy) Riccardo Bonadio (Italy) Riccardo Sinicropi | (Germany) Florian Fallert (Italy) Riccardo Bonadio | (Italy) Andrea Basso (Italy) Stefano Travaglia (Italy) Andrea Vavassori (Italy) Nicola Ghedin |
| September 12 | Spain F30 Futures; Madrid, Spain; Clay (indoor) $10,000; Singles and doubles draws | (Spain) Bernabé Zapata Miralles; 6–2, 6–1 | (Argentina) Gonzalo Villanueva | (Spain) Jaume Munar (Spain) Javier Martí | (Spain) Ricardo Ojeda Lara (Italy) Raúl Brancaccio (Switzerland) Mirko Martinez (Spain) Jaime Fermosell |
| September 12 | Spain F30 Futures; Madrid, Spain; Clay (indoor) $10,000; Singles and doubles draws | (Brazil) Rafael Camilo (Brazil) Eduardo Russi Assumpção; 7–6^{(8–6)}, 6–3 | (Spain) Alejandro Alaix (Spain) Raúl Jiménez Platas | (Spain) Jaume Munar (Spain) Javier Martí | (Spain) Ricardo Ojeda Lara (Italy) Raúl Brancaccio (Switzerland) Mirko Martinez (Spain) Jaime Fermosell |
| September 12 | Tunisia F23 Futures; Hammamet, Tunisia; Clay $10,000; Singles and doubles draws | (Argentina) Mariano Kestelboim; 2–6, 6–2, 6–3 | (Italy) Marco Bortolotti | (Italy) Luca Pancaldi (France) Fabien Reboul | (France) Jules Okala (Argentina) Franco Agamenone (France) Ronan Joncour (France) Benjamin Bonzi |
| September 12 | Tunisia F23 Futures; Hammamet, Tunisia; Clay $10,000; Singles and doubles draws | (France) Benjamin Bonzi (France) Fabien Reboul; 2–6, 7–5, [10–4] | (Argentina) Franco Agamenone (Argentina) Mariano Kestelboim | (Italy) Luca Pancaldi (France) Fabien Reboul | (France) Jules Okala (Argentina) Franco Agamenone (France) Ronan Joncour (France) Benjamin Bonzi |
| September 12 | USA F28 Futures; Claremont, United States; Hard $10,000; Singles and doubles draws | (Germany) Sebastian Fanselow; 7–5, 6–7^{(3–7)}, 6–3 | (United States) Evan Zhu | (United States) Martin Redlicki (Brazil) Alex Blumenberg | (France) Florent Diep (United States) Alexios Halebian (Mexico) Lucas Gómez (Australia) Alexei Popyrin |
| September 12 | USA F28 Futures; Claremont, United States; Hard $10,000; Singles and doubles draws | (United States) Alexios Halebian (Mexico) Luis Patiño; 7–5, 6–4 | (Austria) Sebastian Bader (Germany) Sebastian Fanselow | (United States) Martin Redlicki (Brazil) Alex Blumenberg | (France) Florent Diep (United States) Alexios Halebian (Mexico) Lucas Gómez (Australia) Alexei Popyrin |
| September 12 | Vietnam F4 Futures; Thủ Dầu Một, Vietnam; Hard $10,000; Singles and doubles draws | (Australia) Dayne Kelly; 6–4, 6–2 | (United Kingdom) Joel Cannell | (Japan) Soichiro Moritani (Japan) Yuichi Ito | (Japan) Yusuke Takahashi (China) Ouyang Bowen (Japan) Issei Okamura (Thailand) Congsup Congcar |
| September 12 | Vietnam F4 Futures; Thủ Dầu Một, Vietnam; Hard $10,000; Singles and doubles draws | (Malaysia) Ahmed Deedat Abdul Razak (Chinese Taipei) Chiu Yu-hsiang; 4–6, 6–3, [10–7] | (Vietnam) Lý Hoàng Nam (China) Ouyang Bowen | (Japan) Soichiro Moritani (Japan) Yuichi Ito | (Japan) Yusuke Takahashi (China) Ouyang Bowen (Japan) Issei Okamura (Thailand) Congsup Congcar |
| September 19 | Australia F5 Futures; Alice Springs, Australia; Hard $25,000+H; Singles and doubles draws | (Australia) Marc Polmans; 6–1, 6–7^{(3–7)}, 7–6^{(7–4)} | (United States) Jarmere Jenkins | (New Zealand) Finn Tearney (Australia) Luke Saville | (Australia) Benjamin Mitchell (Australia) Brandon Walkin (Australia) Thomas Fancutt (Australia) Maverick Banes |
| September 19 | Australia F5 Futures; Alice Springs, Australia; Hard $25,000+H; Singles and doubles draws | (Australia) Marc Polmans (Australia) Luke Saville; 6–1, 6–2 | (Australia) Thomas Fancutt (Australia) Calum Puttergill | (New Zealand) Finn Tearney (Australia) Luke Saville | (Australia) Benjamin Mitchell (Australia) Brandon Walkin (Australia) Thomas Fancutt (Australia) Maverick Banes |
| September 19 | Canada F9 Futures; Niagara, Canada; Hard (indoor) $25,000; Singles and doubles draws | (United States) Adam El Mihdawy; 4–6, 7–5, 6–4 | (Canada) Brayden Schnur | (Canada) Alejandro Tabilo (United States) Nicholas Hu | (Canada) Pavel Krainik (United States) Rhyne Williams (Russia) Lev Kazakov (United States) Roy Smith |
| September 19 | Canada F9 Futures; Niagara, Canada; Hard (indoor) $25,000; Singles and doubles draws | (Canada) Filip Peliwo (Canada) Brayden Schnur; 6–3, 6–3 | (Ecuador) Iván Endara (Chile) Nicolás Jarry | (Canada) Alejandro Tabilo (United States) Nicholas Hu | (Canada) Pavel Krainik (United States) Rhyne Williams (Russia) Lev Kazakov (United States) Roy Smith |
| September 19 | France F19 Futures; Plaisir, France; Hard (indoor) $25,000+H; Singles and doubles draws | (France) Romain Jouan; 6–2, 6–2 | (Germany) Robin Kern | (United Kingdom) Edward Corrie (Belgium) Yannick Mertens | (Germany) Sami Reinwein (United States) Peter Kobelt (France) Rémi Boutillier (France) Hugo Grenier |
| September 19 | France F19 Futures; Plaisir, France; Hard (indoor) $25,000+H; Singles and doubles draws | (Republic of Ireland) Sam Barry (United States) Peter Kobelt; 6–4, 7–6^{(7–4)} | (Sweden) Daniel Appelgren (Sweden) Patrik Rosenholm | (United Kingdom) Edward Corrie (Belgium) Yannick Mertens | (Germany) Sami Reinwein (United States) Peter Kobelt (France) Rémi Boutillier (France) Hugo Grenier |
| September 19 | Spain F31 Futures; Seville, Spain; Clay $25,000; Singles and doubles draws | (Spain) Álvaro López San Martín; 6–4, 6–1 | (Spain) Marc Giner | (Spain) Jaume Munar (Spain) Bernabé Zapata Miralles | (France) Maxime Hamou (Spain) Eduard Esteve Lobato (Portugal) João Domingues (Spain) Miguel Semmler |
| September 19 | Spain F31 Futures; Seville, Spain; Clay $25,000; Singles and doubles draws | (Spain) Gerard Granollers (Spain) David Vega Hernández; 6–2, 7–5 | (Spain) Eduard Esteve Lobato (Spain) Sergio Martos Gornés | (Spain) Jaume Munar (Spain) Bernabé Zapata Miralles | (France) Maxime Hamou (Spain) Eduard Esteve Lobato (Portugal) João Domingues (Spain) Miguel Semmler |
| September 19 | Egypt F25 Futures; Cairo, Egypt; Clay $10,000; Singles and doubles draws | (Czech Republic) Vít Kopřiva; 3–6, 6–4, 6–1 | (Argentina) Mateo Nicolás Martínez | (Italy) Lorenzo Frigerio (United Kingdom) Jay Clarke | (Austria) Peter Goldsteiner (Germany) Christoph Negritu (Egypt) Samy Grace (Czech Republic) Jaroslav Pospíšil |
| September 19 | Egypt F25 Futures; Cairo, Egypt; Clay $10,000; Singles and doubles draws | (Czech Republic) Vít Kopřiva (Czech Republic) Jaroslav Pospíšil; 6–3, 7–6^{(7–5)} | (Argentina) Gastón-Arturo Grimolizzi (Argentina) Mateo Nicolás Martínez | (Italy) Lorenzo Frigerio (United Kingdom) Jay Clarke | (Austria) Peter Goldsteiner (Germany) Christoph Negritu (Egypt) Samy Grace (Czech Republic) Jaroslav Pospíšil |
| September 19 | Hungary F6 Futures; Dunakeszi, Hungary; Clay $10,000; Singles and doubles draws | (Croatia) Kristijan Mesaroš; 6–3, 6–2 | (Hungary) Péter Nagy | (Slovakia) Patrik Fabian (Austria) Lucas Miedler | (Germany) Pascal Meis (Bulgaria) Alexandar Lazov (Slovakia) Alex Molčan (Russia) Alen Avidzba |
| September 19 | Hungary F6 Futures; Dunakeszi, Hungary; Clay $10,000; Singles and doubles draws | (Hungary) Attila Balázs (Hungary) Gergely Kisgyörgy; 6–1, 6–3 | (Hungary) Levente Gödry (Hungary) Péter Nagy | (Slovakia) Patrik Fabian (Austria) Lucas Miedler | (Germany) Pascal Meis (Bulgaria) Alexandar Lazov (Slovakia) Alex Molčan (Russia) Alen Avidzba |
| September 19 | India F6 Futures; Coimbatore, India; Hard $10,000; Singles and doubles draws | (India) Sanam Singh; 6–3, 3–6, 6–4 | (India) Prajnesh Gunneswaran | (India) Vijay Sundar Prashanth (India) Vishnu Vardhan | (India) Sumit Nagal (India) Sriram Balaji (India) Sasikumar Mukund (India) Sidharth Rawat |
| September 19 | India F6 Futures; Coimbatore, India; Hard $10,000; Singles and doubles draws | (India) Sriram Balaji (India) Vishnu Vardhan; 6–3, 6–1 | (India) Anvit Bendre (India) Vijay Sundar Prashanth | (India) Vijay Sundar Prashanth (India) Vishnu Vardhan | (India) Sumit Nagal (India) Sriram Balaji (India) Sasikumar Mukund (India) Sidharth Rawat |
| September 19 | Israel F13 Futures; Kiryat Gat, Israel; Hard $10,000; Singles and doubles draws | (United States) Austin Smith; 6–1, 6–2 | (Israel) Daniel Cukierman | (Israel) Edan Leshem (Israel) Dekel Bar | (United States) Dane Webb (France) Jonathan Kanar (Israel) Ben Patael (Israel) Mor Bulis |
| September 19 | Israel F13 Futures; Kiryat Gat, Israel; Hard $10,000; Singles and doubles draws | (Israel) Dekel Bar (United Kingdom) Scott Clayton; 6–4, 5–7, [10–5] | (United States) Nathaniel Lammons (United States) Dane Webb | (Israel) Edan Leshem (Israel) Dekel Bar | (United States) Dane Webb (France) Jonathan Kanar (Israel) Ben Patael (Israel) Mor Bulis |
| September 19 | Italy F30 Futures; Pula, Italy; Clay $10,000; Singles and doubles draws | (Italy) Stefano Travaglia; 6–2, 6–3 | (Italy) Nicola Ghedin | (Italy) Walter Trusendi (Italy) Andrea Basso | (Italy) Gianluca Di Nicola (Italy) Francesco Picco (Argentina) Gabriel Alejandro Hidalgo (Italy) Pietro Licciardi |
| September 19 | Italy F30 Futures; Pula, Italy; Clay $10,000; Singles and doubles draws | (United States) Dominic Cotrone (United States) Alex Rybakov; 5–7, 6–3, [10–6] | (Germany) Florian Fallert (Germany) Demian Raab | (Italy) Walter Trusendi (Italy) Andrea Basso | (Italy) Gianluca Di Nicola (Italy) Francesco Picco (Argentina) Gabriel Alejandro Hidalgo (Italy) Pietro Licciardi |
| September 19 | Kazakhstan F5 Futures; Shymkent, Kazakhstan; Clay $10,000; Singles and doubles draws | (Estonia) Vladimir Ivanov; 7–5, 4–6, 7–6^{(9–7)} | (Uzbekistan) Khumoyun Sultonov | (Uzbekistan) Sanjar Fayziev (Russia) Ivan Davydov | (Russia) Danila Arsenov (Uzbekistan) Jurabek Karimov (Uzbekistan) Sharobiddin Abzalov (Russia) Ilya Vasilyev |
| September 19 | Kazakhstan F5 Futures; Shymkent, Kazakhstan; Clay $10,000; Singles and doubles draws | (Russia) Mikhail Fufygin (Estonia) Vladimir Ivanov; 7–5, 6–2 | (Uzbekistan) Jurabek Karimov (Kazakhstan) Roman Khassanov | (Uzbekistan) Sanjar Fayziev (Russia) Ivan Davydov | (Russia) Danila Arsenov (Uzbekistan) Jurabek Karimov (Uzbekistan) Sharobiddin Abzalov (Russia) Ilya Vasilyev |
| September 19 | Serbia F8 Futures; Sokobanja, Serbia; Clay $10,000; Singles and doubles draws | (Bulgaria) Alexandar Lazarov; 6–7^{(2–7)}, 7–6^{(7–4)}, 3–0, ret. | (Croatia) Filip Veger | (Slovenia) Mike Urbanija (Croatia) Nino Serdarušić | (Italy) Davide Galoppini (North Macedonia) Gorazd Srbljak (Chile) Cristóbal Saavedra (Argentina) Matías Zukas |
| September 19 | Serbia F8 Futures; Sokobanja, Serbia; Clay $10,000; Singles and doubles draws | (Croatia) Nino Serdarušić (Argentina) Matías Zukas; 6–2, 6–4 | (Germany) Nils Brinkmann (Serbia) Dejan Katić | (Slovenia) Mike Urbanija (Croatia) Nino Serdarušić | (Italy) Davide Galoppini (North Macedonia) Gorazd Srbljak (Chile) Cristóbal Saavedra (Argentina) Matías Zukas |
| September 19 | Tunisia F24 Futures; Hammamet, Tunisia; Clay $10,000; Singles and doubles draws | (Argentina) Franco Agamenone; 6–0, 6–1 | (France) Valentin Vacherot | (France) Louis Tessa (Argentina) Mariano Kestelboim | (Russia) Ivan Nedelko (France) Jordan Ubiergo (Italy) Eros Siringo (Italy) Marco Bortolotti |
| September 19 | Tunisia F24 Futures; Hammamet, Tunisia; Clay $10,000; Singles and doubles draws | (Argentina) Franco Agamenone (Argentina) Mariano Kestelboim; 6–2, 6–3 | (Argentina) Eduardo Agustín Torre (Uruguay) Nicolás Xiviller | (France) Louis Tessa (Argentina) Mariano Kestelboim | (Russia) Ivan Nedelko (France) Jordan Ubiergo (Italy) Eros Siringo (Italy) Marco Bortolotti |
| September 19 | Ukraine F4 Futures; Cherkasy, Ukraine; Clay $10,000; Singles and doubles draws | (France) Corentin Moutet; 6–1, 6–3 | (Germany) Leon Schütt | (Lithuania) Lukas Mugevičius (Germany) Julian Onken | (Ukraine) Oleksandr Bielinskyi (Ukraine) Denys Mylokostov (Ukraine) Daniil Zarichanskyy (Ukraine) Vadim Alekseenko |
| September 19 | Ukraine F4 Futures; Cherkasy, Ukraine; Clay $10,000; Singles and doubles draws | (Belarus) Artsiom Dabryian (Ukraine) Denys Mylokostov; 6–2, 7–5 | (Ukraine) Stanislav Poplavskyy (Ukraine) Danylo Veremeychuk | (Lithuania) Lukas Mugevičius (Germany) Julian Onken | (Ukraine) Oleksandr Bielinskyi (Ukraine) Denys Mylokostov (Ukraine) Daniil Zarichanskyy (Ukraine) Vadim Alekseenko |
| September 19 | USA F29 Futures; Irvine, United States; Hard $10,000; Singles and doubles draws | (United States) Mackenzie McDonald; 6–0, 6–3 | (Germany) Jan Choinski | (United States) Alexios Halebian (Germany) Sebastian Fanselow | (Serbia) Miomir Kecmanović (Argentina) Santiago Rodríguez Taverna (Mexico) Lucas Gómez (United States) Marcos Giron |
| September 19 | USA F29 Futures; Irvine, United States; Hard $10,000; Singles and doubles draws | (United States) Deiton Baughman (United States) Mackenzie McDonald; 6–4, 6–3 | (United States) Timothy Sah (United States) Ryan Seggerman | (United States) Alexios Halebian (Germany) Sebastian Fanselow | (Serbia) Miomir Kecmanović (Argentina) Santiago Rodríguez Taverna (Mexico) Lucas Gómez (United States) Marcos Giron |
| September 19 | Vietnam F5 Futures; Thủ Dầu Một, Vietnam; Hard $10,000; Singles and doubles draws | (Vietnam) Lý Hoàng Nam; 6–4, 6–2 | (Japan) Masato Shiga | (Japan) Yuichi Ito (China) Gao Xin | (Japan) Soichiro Moritani (United States) Daniel Nguyen (China) Ouyang Bowen (Japan) Shinta Fujii |
| September 19 | Vietnam F5 Futures; Thủ Dầu Một, Vietnam; Hard $10,000; Singles and doubles draws | (Vietnam) Lý Hoàng Nam (Vietnam) Nguyễn Hoàng Thiên; 7–6^{(7–4)}, 7–6^{(7–4)} | (China) Gao Xin (Japan) Shintaro Imai | (Japan) Yuichi Ito (China) Gao Xin | (Japan) Soichiro Moritani (United States) Daniel Nguyen (China) Ouyang Bowen (Japan) Shinta Fujii |
| September 26 | Australia F6 Futures; Brisbane, Australia; Hard $25,000; Singles and doubles draws | (United States) Jarmere Jenkins; 6–1, 7–5 | (Australia) Marc Polmans | (Australia) Max Purcell (Australia) Alex de Minaur | (Australia) Luke Saville (New Zealand) Finn Tearney (Australia) Bradley Mousley (Australia) Harry Bourchier |
| September 26 | Australia F6 Futures; Brisbane, Australia; Hard $25,000; Singles and doubles draws | (Australia) Dayne Kelly (Australia) Bradley Mousley; 6–2, 6–3 | (Australia) Harry Bourchier (Australia) James Frawley | (Australia) Max Purcell (Australia) Alex de Minaur | (Australia) Luke Saville (New Zealand) Finn Tearney (Australia) Bradley Mousley (Australia) Harry Bourchier |
| September 26 | Hungary F7 Futures; Balatonboglár, Hungary; Clay $25,000; Singles and doubles draws | (India) Sumit Nagal; 7–6^{(7–3)}, 6–1 | (Hungary) Péter Nagy | (Austria) Sebastian Ofner (Croatia) Kristijan Mesaroš | (Czech Republic) Pavel Nejedlý (Austria) Lenny Hampel (France) Johan Tatlot (Ukraine) Artem Smirnov |
| September 26 | Hungary F7 Futures; Balatonboglár, Hungary; Clay $25,000; Singles and doubles draws | (Poland) Mateusz Kowalczyk (Poland) Grzegorz Panfil; 6–2, 6–7^{(4–7)}, [10–4] | (Poland) Paweł Ciaś (Poland) Marcin Gawron | (Austria) Sebastian Ofner (Croatia) Kristijan Mesaroš | (Czech Republic) Pavel Nejedlý (Austria) Lenny Hampel (France) Johan Tatlot (Ukraine) Artem Smirnov |
| September 26 | Israel F14 Futures; Meitar, Israel; Hard $25,000; Singles and doubles draws | (Russia) Roman Safiullin; 6–0, 6–4 | (Israel) Daniel Cukierman | (Israel) Yishai Oliel (United States) Evan Song | (Israel) Amir Weintraub (United Kingdom) Scott Clayton (Israel) Orel Ovil (Switzerland) Antoine Bellier |
| September 26 | Israel F14 Futures; Meitar, Israel; Hard $25,000; Singles and doubles draws | (Israel) Dekel Bar (United Kingdom) Scott Clayton; 3–6, 6–3, [10–8] | (United States) Brandon Anandan (United States) Austin Smith | (Israel) Yishai Oliel (United States) Evan Song | (Israel) Amir Weintraub (United Kingdom) Scott Clayton (Israel) Orel Ovil (Switzerland) Antoine Bellier |
| September 26 | Portugal F11 Futures; Oliveira de Azeméis, Portugal; Hard $25,000; Singles and doubles draws | (Greece) Stefanos Tsitsipas; 6–3, 4–6, 6–2 | (Belgium) Yannick Mertens | (Portugal) Miguel Semedo (Portugal) João Domingues | (Portugal) Tiago Cação (Poland) Maciej Rajski (Spain) Pablo Vivero González (Spain) Andrés Artuñedo |
| September 26 | Portugal F11 Futures; Oliveira de Azeméis, Portugal; Hard $25,000; Singles and doubles draws | (Portugal) Nuno Deus (Portugal) João Domingues; 7–6^{(9–7)}, 6–1 | (Italy) Lorenzo Frigerio (Greece) Stefanos Tsitsipas | (Portugal) Miguel Semedo (Portugal) João Domingues | (Portugal) Tiago Cação (Poland) Maciej Rajski (Spain) Pablo Vivero González (Spain) Andrés Artuñedo |
| September 26 | Sweden F4 Futures; Stockholm, Sweden; Hard (indoor) $25,000; Singles and doubles draws | (Belarus) Dzmitry Zhyrmont; 7–6^{(7–5)}, 6–1 | (United Kingdom) Edward Corrie | (Germany) Mats Moraing (Republic of Ireland) Sam Barry | (United Kingdom) Liam Broady (France) Laurent Lokoli (Australia) Christopher O'Connell (Sweden) Markus Eriksson |
| September 26 | Sweden F4 Futures; Stockholm, Sweden; Hard (indoor) $25,000; Singles and doubles draws | (Sweden) Daniel Appelgren (Sweden) Patrik Rosenholm; 6–3, 3–6, [10–1] | (Sweden) Markus Eriksson (Sweden) Milos Sekulic | (Germany) Mats Moraing (Republic of Ireland) Sam Barry | (United Kingdom) Liam Broady (France) Laurent Lokoli (Australia) Christopher O'Connell (Sweden) Markus Eriksson |
| September 26 | Croatia F8 Futures; Solin, Croatia; Clay $10,000; Singles and doubles draws | (France) Corentin Moutet; 6–2, 7–6^{(7–1)} | (Croatia) Nino Serdarušić | (Slovenia) Mike Urbanija (Croatia) Mate Delić | (Italy) Riccardo Bellotti (Austria) David Pichler (Croatia) Domagoj Bilješko (Montenegro) Rrezart Cungu |
| September 26 | Croatia F8 Futures; Solin, Croatia; Clay $10,000; Singles and doubles draws | (Austria) Pascal Brunner (Austria) Lucas Miedler; 6–2, 7–6^{(11–9)} | (Ukraine) Filipp Kekercheni (Austria) David Pichler | (Slovenia) Mike Urbanija (Croatia) Mate Delić | (Italy) Riccardo Bellotti (Austria) David Pichler (Croatia) Domagoj Bilješko (Montenegro) Rrezart Cungu |
| September 26 | Egypt F26 Futures; Cairo, Egypt; Clay $10,000; Singles and doubles draws | (Czech Republic) Jaroslav Pospíšil; 6–3, 3–6, 6–1 | (Bolivia) Federico Zeballos | (Egypt) Youssef Hossam (Czech Republic) Vít Kopřiva | (United Kingdom) Jay Clarke (Peru) Alexander Merino (Austria) Peter Goldsteiner (Argentina) Mateo Nicolás Martínez |
| September 26 | Egypt F26 Futures; Cairo, Egypt; Clay $10,000; Singles and doubles draws | (Argentina) Gastón-Arturo Grimolizzi (Argentina) Mateo Nicolás Martínez; 7–6^{(7–5)}, 7–6^{(7–1)} | (Peru) Alexander Merino (Germany) Christoph Negritu | (Egypt) Youssef Hossam (Czech Republic) Vít Kopřiva | (United Kingdom) Jay Clarke (Peru) Alexander Merino (Austria) Peter Goldsteiner (Argentina) Mateo Nicolás Martínez |
| September 26 | France F20 Futures; Sarreguemines, France; Carpet (indoor) $10,000; Singles and doubles draws | (Czech Republic) Marek Jaloviec; 6–2, 7–6^{(7–4)} | (United States) Raymond Sarmiento | (France) Hugo Grenier (France) Albano Olivetti | (Germany) Robin Kern (France) Romain Bauvy (France) Élie Rousset (France) Hugo Voljacques |
| September 26 | France F20 Futures; Sarreguemines, France; Carpet (indoor) $10,000; Singles and doubles draws | (France) Dan Added (France) Albano Olivetti; 7–6^{(13–11)}, 6–1 | (Germany) Denis Kapric (Germany) Lukas Ollert | (France) Hugo Grenier (France) Albano Olivetti | (Germany) Robin Kern (France) Romain Bauvy (France) Élie Rousset (France) Hugo Voljacques |
| September 26 | Italy F31 Futures; Pula, Italy; Clay $10,000; Singles and doubles draws | (Italy) Walter Trusendi; 6–3, 6–1 | (Italy) Riccardo Bonadio | (Germany) Yannick Maden (United States) Alex Rybakov | (Italy) Francesco Picco (Italy) Claudio Fortuna (France) Corentin Denolly (Italy) Antonio Massara |
| September 26 | Italy F31 Futures; Pula, Italy; Clay $10,000; Singles and doubles draws | (Italy) Riccardo Bonadio (Italy) Francesco Picco; 5–7, 6–3, [12–10] | (Italy) Davide Della Tommasina (Italy) Riccardo Sinicropi | (Germany) Yannick Maden (United States) Alex Rybakov | (Italy) Francesco Picco (Italy) Claudio Fortuna (France) Corentin Denolly (Italy) Antonio Massara |
| September 26 | Kazakhstan F6 Futures; Shymkent, Kazakhstan; Clay $10,000; Singles and doubles draws | (Uzbekistan) Sanjar Fayziev; 4–6, 6–3, 6–2 | (Estonia) Vladimir Ivanov | (Uzbekistan) Jurabek Karimov (Russia) Mikhail Fufygin | (Bulgaria) Dimitar Kuzmanov (Kazakhstan) Roman Khassanov (Russia) Victor Baluda (Russia) Ivan Davydov |
| September 26 | Kazakhstan F6 Futures; Shymkent, Kazakhstan; Clay $10,000; Singles and doubles draws | (Kazakhstan) Timur Khabibulin (Uzbekistan) Khumoyun Sultonov; 7–6^{(7–2)}, 6–3 | (Russia) Mikhail Fufygin (Estonia) Vladimir Ivanov | (Uzbekistan) Jurabek Karimov (Russia) Mikhail Fufygin | (Bulgaria) Dimitar Kuzmanov (Kazakhstan) Roman Khassanov (Russia) Victor Baluda (Russia) Ivan Davydov |
| September 26 | Spain F32 Futures; Sabadell, Spain; Clay $10,000; Singles and doubles draws | (Spain) Jaume Munar; Walkover | (Spain) Álvaro López San Martín | (Spain) Jaume Pla Malfeito (Argentina) Pedro Cachin | (Spain) Oriol Roca Batalla (Spain) Eduard Esteve Lobato (Spain) Marcos Giraldi Requena (Spain) Carlos Boluda-Purkiss |
| September 26 | Spain F32 Futures; Sabadell, Spain; Clay $10,000; Singles and doubles draws | (Chile) Cristóbal Saavedra (Germany) Jean-Marc Werner; 5–7, 7–6^{(7–4)}, [10–6] | (Spain) Marc Fornell (Spain) Jaume Pla Malfeito | (Spain) Jaume Pla Malfeito (Argentina) Pedro Cachin | (Spain) Oriol Roca Batalla (Spain) Eduard Esteve Lobato (Spain) Marcos Giraldi Requena (Spain) Carlos Boluda-Purkiss |
| September 26 | Tunisia F25 Futures; Hammamet, Tunisia; Clay $10,000; Singles and doubles draws | (France) Benjamin Bonzi; 7–6^{(7–3)}, 6–2 | (Argentina) Mariano Kestelboim | (France) Valentin Vacherot (Austria) Michael Linzer | (Spain) David Pérez Sanz (Switzerland) Luca Margaroli (Argentina) Matías Zukas (Italy) Laerte Di Falco |
| September 26 | Tunisia F25 Futures; Hammamet, Tunisia; Clay $10,000; Singles and doubles draws | (France) Benjamin Bonzi (Austria) Bernd Kossler; 6–3, 6–3 | (Argentina) Eduardo Agustín Torre (Argentina) Matías Zukas | (France) Valentin Vacherot (Austria) Michael Linzer | (Spain) David Pérez Sanz (Switzerland) Luca Margaroli (Argentina) Matías Zukas (Italy) Laerte Di Falco |
| September 26 | Ukraine F5 Futures; Kyiv, Ukraine; Hard $10,000; Singles and doubles draws | (Ukraine) Denys Mylokostov; 6–4, 6–3 | (Lithuania) Lukas Mugevičius | (Kazakhstan) Denis Yevseyev (Ukraine) Vladyslav Manafov | (Bulgaria) Vasko Mladenov (Netherlands) Vincent van den Honert (Ukraine) Marat Deviatiarov (Ukraine) Dmytro Kamynin |
| September 26 | Ukraine F5 Futures; Kyiv, Ukraine; Hard $10,000; Singles and doubles draws | (Ukraine) Igor Karpovets (Ukraine) Denys Molchanov; 6–4, 6–3 | (Ukraine) Oleg Prihodko (Ukraine) Daniil Zarichanskyy | (Kazakhstan) Denis Yevseyev (Ukraine) Vladyslav Manafov | (Bulgaria) Vasko Mladenov (Netherlands) Vincent van den Honert (Ukraine) Marat Deviatiarov (Ukraine) Dmytro Kamynin |
| September 26 | USA F30 Futures; Fountain Valley, United States; Hard $10,000; Singles and doubles draws | (Germany) Sebastian Fanselow; 6–1, 7–6^{(11–9)} | (Zimbabwe) Takanyi Garanganga | (Sweden) Carl Söderlund (United States) Marcos Giron | (Australia) Alexei Popyrin (Serbia) Miomir Kecmanović (Russia) Markos Kalovelonis (Colombia) Alejandro Gómez |
| September 26 | USA F30 Futures; Fountain Valley, United States; Hard $10,000; Singles and doubles draws | (United States) Hunter Johnson (United States) Yates Johnson; 6–4, 7–5 | (Austria) Sebastian Bader (Germany) Sebastian Fanselow | (Sweden) Carl Söderlund (United States) Marcos Giron | (Australia) Alexei Popyrin (Serbia) Miomir Kecmanović (Russia) Markos Kalovelonis (Colombia) Alejandro Gómez |
| September 26 | Vietnam F6 Futures; Thủ Dầu Một, Vietnam; Hard $10,000; Singles and doubles draws | (Chinese Taipei) Chen Ti; 6–0, 6–0 | (Japan) Makoto Ochi | (China) Gao Xin (Japan) Yusuke Takahashi | (South Korea) Oh Chan-yeong (Japan) Masato Shiga (Vietnam) Lý Hoàng Nam (China) Ouyang Bowen |
| September 26 | Vietnam F6 Futures; Thủ Dầu Một, Vietnam; Hard $10,000; Singles and doubles draws | (Chinese Taipei) Chen Ti (Chinese Taipei) Hung Jui-chen; 4–6, 6–1, [11–9] | (Chinese Taipei) Chiu Yu-hsiang (Japan) Ken Onishi | (China) Gao Xin (Japan) Yusuke Takahashi | (South Korea) Oh Chan-yeong (Japan) Masato Shiga (Vietnam) Lý Hoàng Nam (China) Ouyang Bowen |
