= 2014 Shenzhen Open – Doubles =

2014 Shenzhen Open – Doubles may refer to:

- 2014 ATP Shenzhen Open – Doubles
- 2014 WTA Shenzhen Open – Doubles

== See also ==
- 2014 Shenzhen Open
