= 2014 Shenzhen Open – Singles =

2014 Shenzhen Open – Singles may refer to:

- 2014 ATP Shenzhen Open – Singles
- 2014 WTA Shenzhen Open – Singles

== See also ==
- 2014 Shenzhen Open
