= 2014 ATP Shenzhen Open – Doubles =

Doubles
- 2014 ATP Shenzhen Open

Final
- Champions: (Netherlands) Jean-Julien Rojer (Romania) Horia Tecău
- Runners-up: (Australia) Sam Groth (Australia) Chris Guccione
- Score: 6–4, 7–6^{(7–4)}

Events
Singles	Doubles
ATP Shenzhen Open	· 2015 →

This was the first edition of the tournament.

Jean-Julien Rojer and Horia Tecău won the title, defeating Sam Groth and Chris Guccione in the final, 6–4, 7–6^{(7–4)}.

== Seeds ==
1. (Netherlands) Jean-Julien Rojer / (Romania) Horia Tecău (champions)
2. (Colombia) Juan Sebastián Cabal / (Colombia) Robert Farah (semifinals)
3. (India) Rohan Bopanna / (Pakistan) Aisam-ul-Haq Qureshi (quarterfinals)
4. (Poland) Mariusz Fyrstenberg / (Belarus) Max Mirnyi (quarterfinals)

== Draw ==
=== Key ===
- Q = Qualifier
- WC = Wild card
- LL = Lucky loser
- Alt = Alternate
- SE = Special exempt
- PR = Protected ranking
- ITF = ITF entry
- JE = Junior exempt
- w/o = Walkover
- r = Retired
- d = Defaulted
- SR = Special ranking

=== Draw ===
First round
1	(Netherlands) J-J Rojer (Romania) H Tecău	6	6
(United Kingdom) C Fleming (Sweden) R Lindstedt	2	1
(Russia) E Donskoy (Russia) T Gabashvili	6	6
WC	(China) Z Qiu (China) R Te	3	3
3	(India) R Bopanna (Pakistan) A-u-H Qureshi	6	4	[10]
(Australia) M Ebden (Italy) A Seppi	4	6	[7]
(Argentina) M González (Argentina) J Mónaco	6	3	[4]
(Colombia) S Giraldo (New Zealand) M Venus	4	6	[10]
(Australia) S Groth (Australia) C Guccione	6	6
WC	(China) B Ouyang (China) A Wang	3	4
(United Kingdom) J Delgado (Luxembourg) G Müller	3	6^{4}
4	(Poland) M Fyrstenberg (Belarus) M Mirnyi	6	7^{7}
(Sweden) J Brunström (United States) N Monroe	6^{3}	6	[10]
(Belarus) S Betov (Belarus) A Bury	7^{7}	3	[5]
Alt	(Switzerland) M Chiudinelli (Slovakia) L Lacko	1	1
2	(Colombia) JS Cabal (Colombia) R Farah	6	6

Quarterfinals
1	(Netherlands) J-J Rojer (Romania) H Tecău	6	5	[10]
(Russia) E Donskoy (Russia) T Gabashvili	4	7	[7]
3	(India) R Bopanna (Pakistan) A-u-H Qureshi	4	6^{4}
(Colombia) S Giraldo (New Zealand) M Venus	6	7^{7}
(Australia) S Groth (Australia) C Guccione	6^{7}	7^{7}	[10]
4	(Poland) M Fyrstenberg (Belarus) M Mirnyi	7^{9}	6^{4}	[4]
(Sweden) J Brunström (United States) N Monroe	6	4	[5]
2	(Colombia) JS Cabal (Colombia) R Farah	4	6	[10]

Semifinals
1	(Netherlands) J-J Rojer (Romania) H Tecău	3	6	[10]
(Colombia) S Giraldo (New Zealand) M Venus	6	1	[5]
(Australia) S Groth (Australia) C Guccione	7^{7}	6
2	(Colombia) JS Cabal (Colombia) R Farah	6^{5}	4

Final
1	(Netherlands) J-J Rojer (Romania) H Tecău	6	7^{7}
(Australia) S Groth (Australia) C Guccione	4	6^{4}
