= 2015 ITF Men's Circuit (July–September) =

This article includes the 2015 ITF Men's Circuit tournaments which occurred between July and September 2015.

== Points distribution ==
Tournament category	W	F	SF	QF	R16	R32
Futures 15,000+H	35	20	10	4	1	0
Futures 15,000	27	15	8	3	1	0
Futures 10,000+H	27	15	8	3	1	0
Futures 10,000	18	10	6	2	1	0

== Key ==
$15,000 tournaments
$10,000 tournaments

== Month ==
=== July ===
Week of	Tournament	Winner	Runners-up	Semifinalists	Quarterfinalists
July 6	Colombia F5 Futures; Cali, Colombia; Clay $15,000	Facundo Mena; 6–1, 6–2	Alejandro Gómez	Jorge Montero; Iván Endara	Kevin King; Tigre Hank; Juan Sebastián Gómez; Juan Pablo Varillas
July 6	Colombia F5 Futures; Cali, Colombia; Clay $15,000	José Daniel Bendeck; Alejandro Gómez; 6–2, 6–2	Juan Montes; Óscar Torres	Jorge Montero; Iván Endara	Kevin King; Tigre Hank; Juan Sebastián Gómez; Juan Pablo Varillas
July 6	Czech Republic F6 Futures; Brno, Czech Republic; Clay $15,000	Uladzimir Ignatik; 6–7^{(9–11)}, 6–4, 6–1	Jan Mertl	Marek Michalička; Jan Poskocil	Dušan Lojda; Zdeněk Kolář; Martin Blaško; Kamil Majchrzak
July 6	Czech Republic F6 Futures; Brno, Czech Republic; Clay $15,000	Uladzimir Ignatik; Roman Jebavý; 6–1, 6–4	Dušan Lojda; Václav Šafránek	Marek Michalička; Jan Poskocil	Dušan Lojda; Zdeněk Kolář; Martin Blaško; Kamil Majchrzak
July 6	France F13 Futures; Bourg-en-Bresse, France; Clay $15,000+H	Jordi Samper Montaña; 6–3, 6–4	Zhang Zhizhen	Sadio Doumbia; Jonathan Eysseric	Florian Reynet; Constant Lestienne; Guillaume Rufin; Vincent Millot
July 6	France F13 Futures; Bourg-en-Bresse, France; Clay $15,000+H	Fabien Reboul; Maxime Teixeira; 7–6^{(7–5)}, 4–6, [10–8]	Gianni Mina; Élie Rousset	Sadio Doumbia; Jonathan Eysseric	Florian Reynet; Constant Lestienne; Guillaume Rufin; Vincent Millot
July 6	Great Britain F6 Futures; Frinton, Great Britain; Grass $15,000	Daniel Evans; 7–6^{(7–4)}, 7–6^{(10–8)}	Daniel Smethurst	Marcus Willis; Tom Farquharson	Edward Corrie; Joshua Milton; Neil Pauffley; Jordan Thompson
July 6	Great Britain F6 Futures; Frinton, Great Britain; Grass $15,000	Daniel Smethurst; Marcus Willis; 6–4, 6–4	Evan Hoyt; Bradley Mousley	Marcus Willis; Tom Farquharson	Edward Corrie; Joshua Milton; Neil Pauffley; Jordan Thompson
July 6	Italy F17 Futures; Sassuolo, Italy; Clay $15,000	Alessandro Giannessi; 4–6, 6–3, 6–2	Gianluca Naso	Enrico Dalla Valle; Stefano Travaglia	Mohamed Safwat; Antonio Massara; Pietro Licciardi; Federico Coria
July 6	Italy F17 Futures; Sassuolo, Italy; Clay $15,000	Mohamed Safwat; Tristan-Samuel Weissborn; 4–6, 7–5, [10–8]	Alessandro Giannessi; Matteo Volante	Enrico Dalla Valle; Stefano Travaglia	Mohamed Safwat; Antonio Massara; Pietro Licciardi; Federico Coria
July 6	Netherlands F4 Futures; Amstelveen, Netherlands; Clay $15,000	Yannick Mertens; 6–4, 6–4	Yann Marti	Maverick Banes; Alexey Vatutin	Gerard Granollers; Greg Ouellette; Thomas Schoorel; Tak Khunn Wang
July 6	Netherlands F4 Futures; Amstelveen, Netherlands; Clay $15,000	Deiton Baughman; Eduardo Dischinger; 2–6, 6–2, [10–6]	Sander Arends; Niels Lootsma	Maverick Banes; Alexey Vatutin	Gerard Granollers; Greg Ouellette; Thomas Schoorel; Tak Khunn Wang
July 6	Austria F3 Futures; Telfs, Austria; Clay $10,000	Marco Bortolotti; 7–5, 7–6^{(7–4)}	Lenny Hampel	Nicola Ghedin; Bastian Trinker	Stephan Hoiss; Alessandro Bega; Kevin Krawietz; Robin Staněk
July 6	Austria F3 Futures; Telfs, Austria; Clay $10,000	Kevin Krawietz; Hannes Wagner; 6–1, 2–6, [10–7]	Marco Bortolotti; Nicola Ghedin	Nicola Ghedin; Bastian Trinker	Stephan Hoiss; Alessandro Bega; Kevin Krawietz; Robin Staněk
July 6	Belgium F5 Futures; Nieuwpoort, Belgium; Clay $10,000	Filip Horanský; 6–4, 6–2	Yanaïs Laurent	Julien Demois; Yannick Thivant	Scott Griekspoor; Dayne Kelly; Evgeny Karlovskiy; Julien Dubail
July 6	Belgium F5 Futures; Nieuwpoort, Belgium; Clay $10,000	Dayne Kelly; Laurens Verboven; 7–6^{(7–1)}, 2–6, [10–4]	Clément Geens; Omar Salman	Julien Demois; Yannick Thivant	Scott Griekspoor; Dayne Kelly; Evgeny Karlovskiy; Julien Dubail
July 6	Germany F6 Futures; Saarlouis, Germany; Clay $10,000	Sebastian Fanselow; 6–4, 6–2	Duje Kekez	Robin Kern; Pascal Meis	Yan Sabanin; Matteo Fago; Jannis Kahlke; Marc Giner
July 6	Germany F6 Futures; Saarlouis, Germany; Clay $10,000	Danylo Kalenichenko; Duje Kekez; 6–3, 6–2	Sherif Abohabaga; Benjamin Hassan	Robin Kern; Pascal Meis	Yan Sabanin; Matteo Fago; Jannis Kahlke; Marc Giner
July 6	Romania F8 Futures; Pitești, Romania; Clay $10,000	Claudio Fortuna; 6–2, 6–4	Vladyslav Manafov	Petru-Alexandru Luncanu; Jordan Ubiergo	Laurynas Grigelis; Darius Florin Brăguși; Dragoș Dima; Juan Ignacio Ameal
July 6	Romania F8 Futures; Pitești, Romania; Clay $10,000	Claudio Fortuna; Laurynas Grigelis; 6–3, 6–1	Petru-Alexandru Luncanu; Lukas Mugevičius	Petru-Alexandru Luncanu; Jordan Ubiergo	Laurynas Grigelis; Darius Florin Brăguși; Dragoș Dima; Juan Ignacio Ameal
July 6	Serbia F4 Futures; Belgrade, Serbia; Clay $10,000	Juan Pablo Paz; 6–2, 7–5	Guillermo Rivera Aránguiz	Ivan Bjelica; Luka Ilić	Maxime Janvier; Arsenije Zlatanović; Danilo Petrović; Timur Kiuamov
July 6	Serbia F4 Futures; Belgrade, Serbia; Clay $10,000	Ivan Bjelica; Tomislav Draganja; 7–5, 7–6^{(7–3)}	Ivan Sabanov; Matej Sabanov	Ivan Bjelica; Luka Ilić	Maxime Janvier; Arsenije Zlatanović; Danilo Petrović; Timur Kiuamov
July 6	Spain F20 Futures; Getxo, Spain; Clay $10,000	Alexander Ward; 6–1, 6–1	Pedro Martínez	Carlos Taberner; Sergio Martos Gornés	Eduard Esteve Lobato; Juan-Samuel Arauzo-Martínez; Adria Mas Mascolo; Alexander Igoshin
July 6	Spain F20 Futures; Getxo, Spain; Clay $10,000	Eduard Esteve Lobato; Pedro Martínez; 6–1, 6–2	Ivan Gakhov; Alexander Igoshin	Carlos Taberner; Sergio Martos Gornés	Eduard Esteve Lobato; Juan-Samuel Arauzo-Martínez; Adria Mas Mascolo; Alexander Igoshin
July 6	Turkey F27 Futures; Istanbul, Turkey; Hard $10,000	Aleksandre Metreveli; 6–3, 6–3	Egor Gerasimov	Aldin Šetkić; Cem İlkel	Hassan Ndayishimiye; Javier Jover Maestre; Anıl Yüksel; Dzmitry Zhyrmont
July 6	Turkey F27 Futures; Istanbul, Turkey; Hard $10,000	Cem İlkel; Anıl Yüksel; 6–4, 7–6^{(7–2)}	Sarp Ağabigün; Muhammet Haylaz	Aldin Šetkić; Cem İlkel	Hassan Ndayishimiye; Javier Jover Maestre; Anıl Yüksel; Dzmitry Zhyrmont
July 13	China F10 Futures; Xi'an, China; Hard $15,000	Li Zhe; 6–2, 2–6, 6–4	Zhang Ze	Chen Ti; Sriram Balaji	Ning Yuqing; Na Jung-woong; Kento Takeuchi; Bai Yan
July 13	China F10 Futures; Xi'an, China; Hard $15,000	Sriram Balaji; Li Zhe; 4–6, 7–6^{(7–2)}, [13–11]	Bai Yan; Chen Ti	Chen Ti; Sriram Balaji	Ning Yuqing; Na Jung-woong; Kento Takeuchi; Bai Yan
July 13	France F14 Futures; Saint-Gervais, France; Clay $15,000	Jonathan Eysseric; 3–6, 6–1, 6–4	Maxime Chazal	Rayane Roumane; Maxime Teixeira	Daniil Medvedev; Yann Marti; Ricardo Urzúa-Rivera; Alexis Musialek
July 13	France F14 Futures; Saint-Gervais, France; Clay $15,000	Caio Silva; Ricardo Urzúa-Rivera; 7–6^{(7–4)}, 6–1	Daniil Medvedev; Zhang Zhizhen	Rayane Roumane; Maxime Teixeira	Daniil Medvedev; Yann Marti; Ricardo Urzúa-Rivera; Alexis Musialek
July 13	Germany F7 Futures; Kassel, Germany; Clay $15,000+H	Oriol Roca Batalla; 4–1, retired	Peter Torebko	Duje Kekez; Anton Zaitcev	Julian Lenz; Dušan Lojda; Kevin Krawietz; Maximilian Marterer
July 13	Germany F7 Futures; Kassel, Germany; Clay $15,000+H	Alexandar Lazov; Karim-Mohamed Maamoun; 6–2, 5–7, [10–8]	Sander Arends; Adam Hubble	Duje Kekez; Anton Zaitcev	Julian Lenz; Dušan Lojda; Kevin Krawietz; Maximilian Marterer
July 13	Great Britain F7 Futures; Felixstowe, Great Britain; Grass $15,000	Daniel Evans; 6–2, 6–1	Daniel Cox	Jordan Thompson; Marcus Willis	Joe Salisbury; Alexander Ward; Richard Gabb; Robbie Ridout
July 13	Great Britain F7 Futures; Felixstowe, Great Britain; Grass $15,000	Scott Clayton; Richard Gabb; 6–4, 4–6, [10–1]	Jack Findel-Hawkins; Toby Mitchell	Jordan Thompson; Marcus Willis	Joe Salisbury; Alexander Ward; Richard Gabb; Robbie Ridout
July 13	Italy F18 Futures; Modena, Italy; Clay $15,000	Andrea Collarini; 6–2, 6–1	Francisco Bahamonde	Tomás Lipovšek Puches; Lorenzo Sonego	Cristian Carli; Pietro Rondoni; Alessandro Colella; Gianluca Mager
July 13	Italy F18 Futures; Modena, Italy; Clay $15,000	Andrea Collarini; Tomás Lipovšek Puches; 7–5, 5–7, [10–7]	Alessandro Luisi; Andrea Vavassori	Tomás Lipovšek Puches; Lorenzo Sonego	Cristian Carli; Pietro Rondoni; Alessandro Colella; Gianluca Mager
July 13	Austria F4 Futures; Kramsach, Austria; Clay $10,000+H	Daniel Brands; 6–3, 6–4	Tom Kočevar-Dešman	Miljan Zekić; Maximilian Neuchrist	Lucas Miedler; Gavin van Peperzeel; Federico Coria; Nikola Milojević
July 13	Austria F4 Futures; Kramsach, Austria; Clay $10,000+H	Lucas Miedler; Maximilian Neuchrist; 4–6, 6–2, [10–8]	Federico Coria; Cristóbal Saavedra	Miljan Zekić; Maximilian Neuchrist	Lucas Miedler; Gavin van Peperzeel; Federico Coria; Nikola Milojević
July 13	Belgium F6 Futures; Knokke, Belgium; Clay $10,000	Omar Salman; 7–5, 4–6, 7–5	Julien Dubail	Joris De Loore; Jérôme Inzerillo	Scott Griekspoor; Florian Lakat; Jonas Merckx; Eduardo Dischinger
July 13	Belgium F6 Futures; Knokke, Belgium; Clay $10,000	Steven de Waard; Marc Polmans; 5–7, 7–6^{(7–2)}, [10–5]	Maverick Banes; Jacob Grills	Joris De Loore; Jérôme Inzerillo	Scott Griekspoor; Florian Lakat; Jonas Merckx; Eduardo Dischinger
July 13	Portugal F9 Futures; Castelo Branco, Portugal; Clay $10,000	Georgi Rumenov Payakov; 6–3, 3–6, 6–3	Søren Hess-Olesen	Yannick Jankovits; Romain Barbosa	Théo Fournerie; Justin Shane; Jorge Hernando-Ruano; Aswin Lizen
July 13	Portugal F9 Futures; Castelo Branco, Portugal; Clay $10,000	Javier Pulgar-García; Borja Rodríguez Manzano; 6–4, 4–6, [11–9]	Benjamin Bonzi; Grégoire Jacq	Yannick Jankovits; Romain Barbosa	Théo Fournerie; Justin Shane; Jorge Hernando-Ruano; Aswin Lizen
July 13	Romania F9 Futures; Curtea de Argeș, Romania; Clay $10,000	Riccardo Bonadio; 6–3, 4–6, 6–4	Petru-Alexandru Luncanu	Claudio Fortuna; Laurynas Grigelis	Matías Zukas; Darius Florin Brăguși; Vasile Antonescu; Jordan Ubiergo
July 13	Romania F9 Futures; Curtea de Argeș, Romania; Clay $10,000	Mariano Kestelboim; Petru-Alexandru Luncanu; 6–2, 6–1	Bogdan Ionuț Apostol; Lukas Mugevičius	Claudio Fortuna; Laurynas Grigelis	Matías Zukas; Darius Florin Brăguși; Vasile Antonescu; Jordan Ubiergo
July 13	Serbia F5 Futures; Belgrade, Serbia; Clay $10,000	Maxime Janvier; 6–1, 6–4,	João Pedro Sorgi	Ivan Sabanov; Danilo Petrović	Filip Brtnický; Guillermo Rivera Aránguiz; André Gaspar Murta; Miki Janković
July 13	Serbia F5 Futures; Belgrade, Serbia; Clay $10,000	Nebojša Perić; Danilo Petrović; 7–5, 6–2	Antoine Bellier; Maxime Janvier	Ivan Sabanov; Danilo Petrović	Filip Brtnický; Guillermo Rivera Aránguiz; André Gaspar Murta; Miki Janković
July 13	Spain F21 Futures; Gandia, Spain; Clay $10,000	Bernabé Zapata Miralles; 1–6, 7–5, 7–6 ^{7–2}	Albert Alcaraz Ivorra	Eduard Esteve Lobato; Steven Diez	Ivan Gakhov; Pedro Martínez; Ronald Slobodchikov; Eric Fomba
July 13	Spain F21 Futures; Gandia, Spain; Clay $10,000	Eduard Esteve Lobato; Pedro Martínez; 6–1, 6–4	Carlos Boluda-Purkiss; Alberto Romero de Avila Senise	Eduard Esteve Lobato; Steven Diez	Ivan Gakhov; Pedro Martínez; Ronald Slobodchikov; Eric Fomba
July 13	Turkey F28 Futures; Ankara, Turkey; Clay $10,000	Ivan Nedelko; 7–5, 6–3	Vasko Mladenov	Hassan Ndayishimiye; Mirko Cutuli	Aldin Šetkić; Davide Galoppini; Yannick Thivant; Alessandro Bega
July 13	Turkey F28 Futures; Ankara, Turkey; Clay $10,000	Alessandro Bega; Francesco Vilardo; 6–4, 6–3	Tuna Altuna; Altuğ Çelikbilek	Hassan Ndayishimiye; Mirko Cutuli	Aldin Šetkić; Davide Galoppini; Yannick Thivant; Alessandro Bega
July 20	Canada F5 Futures; Vancouver, Canada; Hard $15,000	Andre Dome; 6–3, 3–6, 6–4	Matt Reid	Finn Tearney; Eric James Johnson	Alexios Halebian; Sahak Bazrganian; George Jecminek; Kyryll Kryvchun
July 20	Canada F5 Futures; Vancouver, Canada; Hard $15,000	Andre Dome; Finn Tearney; 6–4, 6–4	Hunter Nicholas; Max Schnur	Finn Tearney; Eric James Johnson	Alexios Halebian; Sahak Bazrganian; George Jecminek; Kyryll Kryvchun
July 20	China F11 Futures; Xi'an, China; Hard $15,000	Li Zhe; 6–1, 6–1	He Yecong	Chen Ti; Yang Tsung-hua	Kento Takeuchi; Yuya Kibi; Kim Young-seok; Ryota Tanuma
July 20	China F11 Futures; Xi'an, China; Hard $15,000	Bai Yan; Hsieh Cheng-peng; 6–7^{(4–7)}, 6–3, [10–7]	Sriram Balaji; Li Zhe	Chen Ti; Yang Tsung-hua	Kento Takeuchi; Yuya Kibi; Kim Young-seok; Ryota Tanuma
July 20	Ireland F1 Futures; Dublin, Ireland; Carpet $15,000	Daniel Smethurst; 6–3, 7–6^{(7–2)}	Lloyd Glasspool	Bjorn Thomson; Daniel Evans	Jamie Whiteford; Mick Lescure; Tom Farquharson; Sam Barry
July 20	Ireland F1 Futures; Dublin, Ireland; Carpet $15,000	Sam Barry; David O'Hare; 6–3, 2–6, [10–3]	Simon Carr; Bjorn Thomson	Bjorn Thomson; Daniel Evans	Jamie Whiteford; Mick Lescure; Tom Farquharson; Sam Barry
July 20	United States F22 Futures; Godfrey, United States; Hard $15,000	Michael Mmoh; 6–3, 3–6, 7–5	Jared Hiltzik	Clay Thompson; Evan King	Kyle Koch; Gonzales Austin; Nick Chappell; Ben McLachlan
July 20	United States F22 Futures; Godfrey, United States; Hard $15,000	Jordi Arconada; Dominic Cotrone; 6–4, 6–4	John Lamble; Frederick Saba	Clay Thompson; Evan King	Kyle Koch; Gonzales Austin; Nick Chappell; Ben McLachlan
July 20	Austria F5 Futures; Bad Waltersdorf, Austria; Clay $10,000	Michal Konečný; 6–1, 6–3	Nicola Ghedin	Patrick Ofner; Tom Kočevar-Dešman	Bernd Kossler; Gibril Diarra; Sebastian Ofner; Lucas Miedler
July 20	Austria F5 Futures; Bad Waltersdorf, Austria; Clay $10,000	Tom Kočevar-Dešman; Lucas Miedler; 6–2, 6–2	Philip Lang; Sebastian Ofner	Patrick Ofner; Tom Kočevar-Dešman	Bernd Kossler; Gibril Diarra; Sebastian Ofner; Lucas Miedler
July 20	Belgium F7 Futures; Duinbergen, Belgium; Clay $10,000	Julien Cagnina; 6–1, 3–1 retired	Joris De Loore	Jacob Grills; Jolan Cailleau	Omar Salman; Julien Dubail; Lennart Zynga; Benjamin D'Hoe
July 20	Belgium F7 Futures; Duinbergen, Belgium; Clay $10,000	Sander Gillé; Joran Vliegen; 6–7^{(5–7)}, 6–4, [10–6]	Julien Cagnina; Jonas Merckx	Jacob Grills; Jolan Cailleau	Omar Salman; Julien Dubail; Lennart Zynga; Benjamin D'Hoe
July 20	France F15 Futures; Troyes, France; Clay $10,000	Maxime Tabatruong; 5–7, 6–2, 6–4	Adrien Puget	Teri Groll; Maxime Tchoutakian	Fabien Reboul; Julien Demois; Thomas le Boulch; Mandresy Rakotomalala
July 20	France F15 Futures; Troyes, France; Clay $10,000	Loïc Perret; Fabien Reboul; 4–6, 6–2, [10–7]	Julien Demois; Yanaïs Laurent	Teri Groll; Maxime Tchoutakian	Fabien Reboul; Julien Demois; Thomas le Boulch; Mandresy Rakotomalala
July 20	Germany F8 Futures; Trier, Germany; Clay $10,000	Maximilian Neuchrist; 6–7^{(5–7)}, 6–4, 6–3	Jan Choinski	Matteo Fago; Jean-Marc Werner	George von Massow; Marc Giner; Stefano Travaglia; Hannes Wagner
July 20	Germany F8 Futures; Trier, Germany; Clay $10,000	Maximilian Neuchrist; George von Massow; 6–4, 5–7, [10–8]	Ugo Nastasi; Mike Scheidweiler	Matteo Fago; Jean-Marc Werner	George von Massow; Marc Giner; Stefano Travaglia; Hannes Wagner
July 20	Lithuania F1 Futures; Vilnius, Lithuania; Clay $10,000	Laurynas Grigelis; 6–3, 6–2	Ronald Slobodchikov	Paweł Ciaś; Gerard Granollers	Yaraslav Shyla; Evgeny Elistratov; Claudio Fortuna; Ivan Nedelko
July 20	Lithuania F1 Futures; Vilnius, Lithuania; Clay $10,000	Laurynas Grigelis; Lukas Mugevičius; 7–5, 3–6, [13–11]	Miķelis Lībietis; Hunter Reese	Paweł Ciaś; Gerard Granollers	Yaraslav Shyla; Evgeny Elistratov; Claudio Fortuna; Ivan Nedelko
July 20	Portugal F10 Futures; Castelo Branco, Portugal; Hard $10,000	Pablo Vivero González; 6–3, 7–6^{(7–4)}	Benjamin Bonzi	Roberto Ortega Olmedo; Georgi Rumenov Payakov	Alexander Ward; Carlos Gómez-Herrera; Grégoire Jacq; Filippo Baldi
July 20	Portugal F10 Futures; Castelo Branco, Portugal; Hard $10,000	Romain Barbosa; Benjamin Bonzi; 7–6^{(10–8)}, 6–7^{(7–9)}, [10–7]	Antoine Hoang; Grégoire Jacq	Roberto Ortega Olmedo; Georgi Rumenov Payakov	Alexander Ward; Carlos Gómez-Herrera; Grégoire Jacq; Filippo Baldi
July 20	Romania F10 Futures; Pitești, Romania; Clay $10,000	Filip Horanský; 6–7^{(2–7)}, 6–2, 6–4	Dragoș Dima	Libor Salaba; Alexandru Jecan	Vadim Alekseenko; Călin Manda; Vasile Antonescu; Mariano Kestelboim
July 20	Romania F10 Futures; Pitești, Romania; Clay $10,000	Victor-Mugurel Anagnastopol; Victor Vlad Cornea; 7–5, 6–2	Matei Adrian Avram; William Emanuel Birău	Libor Salaba; Alexandru Jecan	Vadim Alekseenko; Călin Manda; Vasile Antonescu; Mariano Kestelboim
July 20	Serbia F6 Futures; Belgrade, Serbia; Clay $10,000	Maxime Chazal; 6–2, 2–6, 7–6^{(7–4)}	Miki Janković	Luka Ilić; Juan Pablo Paz	Nino Serdarušić; Antoine Bellier; João Pedro Sorgi; François-Arthur Vibert
July 20	Serbia F6 Futures; Belgrade, Serbia; Clay $10,000	Ljubomir Čelebić; Antun Vidak; 6–1, 6–2	Olexiy Kolisnyk; Anatoliy Petrenko	Luka Ilić; Juan Pablo Paz	Nino Serdarušić; Antoine Bellier; João Pedro Sorgi; François-Arthur Vibert
July 20	Slovakia F2 Futures; Slovenská Ľupča, Slovakia; Clay $10,000	Péter Nagy; 6–3, 7–5	Petr Michnev	Václav Šafránek; Piotr Łomacki	Nikola Milojević; Zdeněk Kolář; Patrik Fabian; Niclas Braun
July 20	Slovakia F2 Futures; Slovenská Ľupča, Slovakia; Clay $10,000	Francesco Borgo; Alessandro Colella; 6–4, 6–4	Gábor Borsos; Péter Nagy	Václav Šafránek; Piotr Łomacki	Nikola Milojević; Zdeněk Kolář; Patrik Fabian; Niclas Braun
July 20	Span F22 Futures; Dénia, Spain; Clay $10,000	Oriol Roca Batalla; 7–5, 7–6^{(7–2)}	Albert Alcaraz Ivorra	Miguel Semmler; Mateo Nicolas Martinez	Carlos Boluda-Purkiss; Alex de Minaur; Marcos Giraldi Requena; Mario Vilella Martínez
July 20	Span F22 Futures; Dénia, Spain; Clay $10,000	Ivan Gakhov; Mikhail Korovin; 6–4, 6–2	Eduardo Russi; Mario Vilella Martínez	Miguel Semmler; Mateo Nicolas Martinez	Carlos Boluda-Purkiss; Alex de Minaur; Marcos Giraldi Requena; Mario Vilella Martínez
July 20	Turkey F29 Futures; Ankara, Turkey; Clay $10,000	Aldin Šetkić; 6–3, 4–6, 7–5	Daniele Capecchi	Nicolás Alberto Arreche; Pirmin Hänle	Gustavo Vellbach; Alexandre Müller; Adria Mas Mascolo; Alessandro Bega
July 20	Turkey F29 Futures; Ankara, Turkey; Clay $10,000	Daniele Capecchi; Federico Maccari; 7–6^{(8–6)}, 3–6, [10–7]	Alexander Igoshin; Vasko Mladenov	Nicolás Alberto Arreche; Pirmin Hänle	Gustavo Vellbach; Alexandre Müller; Adria Mas Mascolo; Alessandro Bega
July 27	Belgium F8 Futures; Westende, Belgium; Hard $15,000	Joran Vliegen; 4–6, 6–3, 7–6^{(7–2)}	Julien Cagnina	Constant Lestienne; Yanaïs Laurent	Alexey Vatutin; Yannik Reuter; Henrique Cunha; Yannick Jankovits
July 27	Belgium F8 Futures; Westende, Belgium; Hard $15,000	Sander Arends; Ariel Behar; 6–7^{(1–7)}, 6–4, [10–7]	Sander Gillé; Joran Vliegen	Constant Lestienne; Yanaïs Laurent	Alexey Vatutin; Yannik Reuter; Henrique Cunha; Yannick Jankovits
July 27	Canada F6 Futures; Saskatoon, Canada; Hard $15,000	Matt Reid; 7–6^{(14–12)}, 6–1	Aleksandar Vukic	Marcos Giron; Fritz Wolmarans	Dennis Nevolo; Andre Dome; Peter Polansky; Raymond Sarmiento
July 27	Canada F6 Futures; Saskatoon, Canada; Hard $15,000	Marcos Giron; Farris Fathi Gosea; 6–3, 6–2	Patrick Davidson; Matt Reid	Marcos Giron; Fritz Wolmarans	Dennis Nevolo; Andre Dome; Peter Polansky; Raymond Sarmiento
July 27	Colombia F6 Futures; Medellín, Colombia; Clay $15,000	Eduardo Struvay; 6–2, 7–5	José Pereira	Juan Sebastián Gómez; Daniel Dutra da Silva	Juan Ignacio Galarza; Michael Quintero; David Souto; Patricio Heras
July 27	Colombia F6 Futures; Medellín, Colombia; Clay $15,000	Nicolás Barrientos; Eduardo Struvay; 6–3, 7–5	Facundo Mena; Jorge Montero	Juan Sebastián Gómez; Daniel Dutra da Silva	Juan Ignacio Galarza; Michael Quintero; David Souto; Patricio Heras
July 27	France F16 Futures; Ajaccio, France; Hard $15,000+H	David Guez; 6–3, 6–4	Alexandre Sidorenko	Maxime Janvier; Laurent Lokoli	Romain Arneodo; Jonathan Kanar; Jérôme Inzerillo; Edoardo Eremin
July 27	France F16 Futures; Ajaccio, France; Hard $15,000+H	Romain Arneodo; Hugo Nys; 2–6, 6–4, [10–5]	Sanchai Ratiwatana; Sonchat Ratiwatana	Maxime Janvier; Laurent Lokoli	Romain Arneodo; Jonathan Kanar; Jérôme Inzerillo; Edoardo Eremin
July 27	Italy F20 Futures; Pontedera, Italy; Clay $15,000	Lorenzo Giustino; 7–6^{(8–6)}, 6–3	Gianluca Mager	Maverick Banes; Marco Trungelliti	Wu Di; Daniele Giorgini; Stefanos Tsitsipas; Gonzalo Lama
July 27	Italy F20 Futures; Pontedera, Italy; Clay $15,000	Wilson Leite; Bruno Sant'Anna; 6–4, 6–2	Andrea Basso; Alessandro Ceppellini	Maverick Banes; Marco Trungelliti	Wu Di; Daniele Giorgini; Stefanos Tsitsipas; Gonzalo Lama
July 27	United States F23 Futures; Edwardsville, United States; Hard $15,000	Evan King; 6–4, 6–3	Clay Thompson	Harry Bourchier; Ante Pavić	Gonzalo Escobar; Mico Santiago; Felix Corwin; Nicolas Meister
July 27	United States F23 Futures; Edwardsville, United States; Hard $15,000	Alan Kohen; John Lamble; 3–6, 7–6^{(7–4)}, [10–7]	Scott Clayton; Richard Gabb	Harry Bourchier; Ante Pavić	Gonzalo Escobar; Mico Santiago; Felix Corwin; Nicolas Meister
July 27	Austria F6 Futures; Wels, Austria; Clay $10,000	Tom Kočevar-Dešman; 6–2, 6–4	Maxime Chazal	Nicola Ghedin; Sebastian Ofner	Nicolas Reissig; Bastian Trinker; Tristan-Samuel Weissborn; Péter Nagy
July 27	Austria F6 Futures; Wels, Austria; Clay $10,000	Lenny Hampel; David Pichler; 6–4, 6–2	Francesco Borgo; Nicola Ghedin	Nicola Ghedin; Sebastian Ofner	Nicolas Reissig; Bastian Trinker; Tristan-Samuel Weissborn; Péter Nagy
July 27	Egypt F24 Futures; Sharm El Sheikh, Egypt; Hard $10,000	Alessandro Bega; 6–2, 7–5	Riccardo Bonadio	Marko Tepavac; Alexander Ward	Filip Brtnický; Olexiy Kolisnyk; Karim Hossam; Antoine Richard
July 27	Egypt F24 Futures; Sharm El Sheikh, Egypt; Hard $10,000	Dan Dowson; Alexander Ward; 6–4, 6–3	Olexiy Kolisnyk; Anatoliy Petrenko	Marko Tepavac; Alexander Ward	Filip Brtnický; Olexiy Kolisnyk; Karim Hossam; Antoine Richard
July 27	Estonia F1 Futures; Pärnu, Estonia; Clay $10,000	Gerard Granollers; 6–2, 6–4	Vladimir Ivanov	Francesco Picco; Kenneth Raisma	Vladimir Polyakov; Aleksandr Vasilenko; Evgeny Elistratov; Adria Mas Mascolo
July 27	Estonia F1 Futures; Pärnu, Estonia; Clay $10,000	Vladimir Ivanov; Markus Kerner; 6–4, 4–6, [10–8]	Ilya Lebedev; Yan Sabanin	Francesco Picco; Kenneth Raisma	Vladimir Polyakov; Aleksandr Vasilenko; Evgeny Elistratov; Adria Mas Mascolo
July 27	Germany F9 Futures; Essen, Germany; Clay $10,000	Christopher Heyman; 7–6^{(7–4)}, 6–4	Tom Schönenberg	Clément Geens; George von Massow	Marvin Netuschil; Tim Nekic; Jules Okala; Guillermo Rivera Aránguiz
July 27	Germany F9 Futures; Essen, Germany; Clay $10,000	Marvin Netuschil; Philipp Scholz; 1–6, 6–7^{(4–7)}, [10–6]	Neil Pauffley; David Rice	Clément Geens; George von Massow	Marvin Netuschil; Tim Nekic; Jules Okala; Guillermo Rivera Aránguiz
July 27	Portugal F11 Futures; Castelo Branco, Portugal; Hard $10,000	Pablo Vivero González; 6–2, 6–1	Jorge Hernando-Ruano	Romain Barbosa; Axel Álvarez Llamas	Søren Hess-Olesen; Matteo Berrettini; Tiago Cação; Carlos Gómez-Herrera
July 27	Portugal F11 Futures; Castelo Branco, Portugal; Hard $10,000	Gonçalo Falcao; Gonçalo Pereira; 6–3, 2–6, [10–5]	Romain Barbosa; Benjamin Bonzi	Romain Barbosa; Axel Álvarez Llamas	Søren Hess-Olesen; Matteo Berrettini; Tiago Cação; Carlos Gómez-Herrera
July 27	Serbia F7 Futures; Sombor, Serbia; Clay $10,000	Gavin van Peperzeel; 6–2, 6–1	Luka Ilić	Dejan Katić; Miki Janković	João Pedro Sorgi; Antoine Bellier; Danilo Petrović; Strahinja Rakić
July 27	Serbia F7 Futures; Sombor, Serbia; Clay $10,000	Ivan Sabanov; Matej Sabanov; 6–4, 6–0	Nerman Fatić; Miki Janković	Dejan Katić; Miki Janković	João Pedro Sorgi; Antoine Bellier; Danilo Petrović; Strahinja Rakić
July 27	Slovakia F3 Futures; Piešťany, Slovakia; Clay $10,000	Uladzimir Ignatik; 6–3, 7–5	Filip Horanský	Václav Šafránek; Marek Semjan	Alessandro Colella; Tomislav Ternar; Marek Jaloviec; Isak Arvidsson
July 27	Slovakia F3 Futures; Piešťany, Slovakia; Clay $10,000	Filip Horanský; Igor Zelenay; 6–4, 1–6, [15–13]	Isak Arvidsson; Gábor Borsos	Václav Šafránek; Marek Semjan	Alessandro Colella; Tomislav Ternar; Marek Jaloviec; Isak Arvidsson
July 27	Spain F23 Futures; Xàtiva, Spain; Clay $10,000	José Checa Calvo; 6–4, 6–1	Johan Tatlot	Marc Giner; Toby Martin	Carlos Boluda-Purkiss; Pol Toledo Bagué; Albert Alcaraz Ivorra; Pedro Martínez
July 27	Spain F23 Futures; Xàtiva, Spain; Clay $10,000	Neeraj Elangovan; Niki Kaliyanda Poonacha; 6–1, 6–3	Amadeo Blasco Hervas; David Sánchez Herrero	Marc Giner; Toby Martin	Carlos Boluda-Purkiss; Pol Toledo Bagué; Albert Alcaraz Ivorra; Pedro Martínez
July 27	Tunisia F16 Futures; Tunis, Tunisia; Clay $10,000	Cristóbal Saavedra; 7–6^{(9–7)}, 3–6, 6–4	Tomislav Jotovski	Jaume Pla Malfeito; Moez Echargui	Tak Khunn Wang; Sasha Merzetti; Hicham Khaddari; Ricardo Urzúa-Rivera
July 27	Tunisia F16 Futures; Tunis, Tunisia; Clay $10,000	Florent Diep; Tak Khunn Wang; 6–4, 6–0	Mauricio Álvarez-Guzmán; Jordan Dyke	Jaume Pla Malfeito; Moez Echargui	Tak Khunn Wang; Sasha Merzetti; Hicham Khaddari; Ricardo Urzúa-Rivera
July 27	Turkey F30 Futures; Erzurum, Turkey; Hard $10,000	Alexander Igoshin; 7–6^{(7–3)}, 4–6, 7–6^{(8–6)}	Bradley Mousley	Nicolás Alberto Arreche; Altuğ Çelikbilek	Isaac Frost; Daniel Glancy; Fedor Chervyakov; Anıl Yüksel
July 27	Turkey F30 Futures; Erzurum, Turkey; Hard $10,000	Tuna Altuna; Bradley Mousley; 7–5, 6–4	Daniel Glancy; Alexander Igoshin	Nicolás Alberto Arreche; Altuğ Çelikbilek	Isaac Frost; Daniel Glancy; Fedor Chervyakov; Anıl Yüksel

=== August ===
Week of	Tournament	Winner	Runners-up	Semifinalists	Quarterfinalists
August 3	China F12 Futures; Fuzhou, China; Hard $15,000	Bai Yan; 6–2, 6–3	Arata Onozawa	Lee Duck-hee; Masato Shiga	Cao Zhaoyi; Wang Aoxiong; Winston Lin; Ning Yuqing
August 3	China F12 Futures; Fuzhou, China; Hard $15,000	Hsieh Cheng-peng; Yang Tsung-hua; 6–3, 7–5	Yuya Kibi; Arata Onozawa	Lee Duck-hee; Masato Shiga	Cao Zhaoyi; Wang Aoxiong; Winston Lin; Ning Yuqing
August 3	Colombia F7 Futures; Bucaramanga, Colombia; Clay $15,000	Nicolás Barrientos; 1–6, 6–3, 6–4	José Pereira	Juan Ignacio Galarza; Juan Sebastián Gómez	Facundo Mena; Eduardo Struvay; Christopher Díaz Figueroa; Daniel Dutra da Silva
August 3	Colombia F7 Futures; Bucaramanga, Colombia; Clay $15,000	Facundo Mena; Jorge Montero; 6–2, 6–2	Nicolás Barrientos; Juan Montes	Juan Ignacio Galarza; Juan Sebastián Gómez	Facundo Mena; Eduardo Struvay; Christopher Díaz Figueroa; Daniel Dutra da Silva
August 3	Italy F21 Futures; Bolzano, Italy; Clay $15,000	Salvatore Caruso; 6–3, 6–4	Marco Bortolotti	Collin Altamirano; Ricardo Rodríguez	Pietro Rondoni; Omar Giacalone; Wilson Leite; Florian Fallert
August 3	Italy F21 Futures; Bolzano, Italy; Clay $15,000	Maverick Banes; Bruno Sant'Anna; 6–3, 3–6, [10–7]	Omar Giacalone; Pietro Rondoni	Collin Altamirano; Ricardo Rodríguez	Pietro Rondoni; Omar Giacalone; Wilson Leite; Florian Fallert
August 3	Russia F5 Futures; Moscow, Russia; Clay $15,000	Marc Giner; 6–1, 6–1	Anton Galkin	Valery Rudnev; Ivan Gakhov	Alexey Vatutin; Evgenii Tiurnev; Evgeny Elistratov; Boris Pokotilov
August 3	Russia F5 Futures; Moscow, Russia; Clay $15,000	Vladimir Ivanov; Andrei Vasilevski; 6–2, 6–4	Vladyslav Manafov; Mark Vervoort	Valery Rudnev; Ivan Gakhov	Alexey Vatutin; Evgenii Tiurnev; Evgeny Elistratov; Boris Pokotilov
August 3	Thailand F6 Futures; Bangkok, Thailand; Hard $15,000	Jordan Thompson; 6–2, 6–2	Chen Ti	Vishnu Vardhan; Benjamin Mitchell	Akira Santillan; Issei Okamura; Pruchya Isaro; Ryota Tanuma
August 3	Thailand F6 Futures; Bangkok, Thailand; Hard $15,000	Toshihide Matsui; Christopher Rungkat; 4–6, 3–6, [11–9]	Benjamin Mitchell; Jordan Thompson	Vishnu Vardhan; Benjamin Mitchell	Akira Santillan; Issei Okamura; Pruchya Isaro; Ryota Tanuma
August 3	United States F24 Futures; Decatur, United States; Hard $15,000	Luke Saville; 6–4, 6–4	Kevin King	Matt Reid; Richard Gabb	Andrew Whittington; Gonzalo Escobar; Harry Bourchier; Dominic Cotrone
August 3	United States F24 Futures; Decatur, United States; Hard $15,000	Evan King; Kevin King; 6–0, 6–2	Grégoire Barrère; Tom Jomby	Matt Reid; Richard Gabb	Andrew Whittington; Gonzalo Escobar; Harry Bourchier; Dominic Cotrone
August 3	Belgium F9 Futures; Eupen, Belgium; Clay $10,000	Oscar Otte; 4–6, 6–2, 6–3	Joris De Loore	Constant Lestienne; Stijn Meulemans	Andrei Plotniy; Jolan Cailleau; Michael Geerts; Romain Barbosa
August 3	Belgium F9 Futures; Eupen, Belgium; Clay $10,000	Billy Harris; Evan Hoyt; 7–6^{(7–5)}, 6–3	Sander Gillé; Joran Vliegen	Constant Lestienne; Stijn Meulemans	Andrei Plotniy; Jolan Cailleau; Michael Geerts; Romain Barbosa
August 3	Egypt F25 Futures; Sharm El Sheikh, Egypt; Hard $10,000	Alexander Ward; 2–6, 6–3, 6–4	Alessandro Bega	Tucker Vorster; Marko Tepavac	Riccardo Bonadio; Felipe Mantilla; Keelan Oakley; Francesco Vilardo
August 3	Egypt F25 Futures; Sharm El Sheikh, Egypt; Hard $10,000	Riccardo Bonadio; Tommaso Lago; 4–6, 6–4, [10–7]	Alessandro Bega; Francesco Vilardo	Tucker Vorster; Marko Tepavac	Riccardo Bonadio; Felipe Mantilla; Keelan Oakley; Francesco Vilardo
August 3	Finland F1 Futures; Vierumäki, Finland; Clay $10,000	Aleksandr Vasilenko; 7–6^{(11–9)}, 7–6^{(7–4)}	Tallon Griekspoor	Harri Heliövaara; Gonzalo Lama	Micke Kontinen; Mikael Torpegaard; Jacob Adaktusson; Casper Ruud
August 3	Finland F1 Futures; Vierumäki, Finland; Clay $10,000	Bobbie de Goeijen; Tallon Griekspoor; 6–4, 7–6^{(7–2)}	Herkko Pöllänen; Mikael Torpegaard	Harri Heliövaara; Gonzalo Lama	Micke Kontinen; Mikael Torpegaard; Jacob Adaktusson; Casper Ruud
August 3	Germany F10 Futures; Wetzlar, Germany; Clay $10,000	Hugo Dellien; 6–3, 6–3	Jan Choinski	Ljubomir Čelebić; Juan Lizariturry	Pedro Sakamoto; Matthias Wunner; Vadim Alekseenko; Sandro Ehrat
August 3	Germany F10 Futures; Wetzlar, Germany; Clay $10,000	Lukáš Maršoun; Adrian Sikora; 6–2, 6–3	Marvin Netuschil; Philipp Scholz	Ljubomir Čelebić; Juan Lizariturry	Pedro Sakamoto; Matthias Wunner; Vadim Alekseenko; Sandro Ehrat
August 3	Latvia F1 Futures; Jūrmala, Latvia; Clay $10,000	Miķelis Lībietis; 6–3, 6–3	Fred Simonsson	Jelle Sels; Ronald Slobodchikov	Pirmin Hänle; Nico Matic; Adria Mas Mascolo; David Volfson
August 3	Latvia F1 Futures; Jūrmala, Latvia; Clay $10,000	Lukas Mugevičius; Yan Sabanin; 6–3, 6–1	Sergio Martos Gornés; Adria Mas Mascolo	Jelle Sels; Ronald Slobodchikov	Pirmin Hänle; Nico Matic; Adria Mas Mascolo; David Volfson
August 3	Slovakia F4 Futures; Trnava, Slovakia; Clay $10,000	Martin Blaško; 3–6, 6–4, 6–4	Tomislav Ternar	Gavin van Peperzeel; Pietro Licciardi	Alessandro Colella; Ivan Kosec; Dmitry Popko; Patrik Fabian
August 3	Slovakia F4 Futures; Trnava, Slovakia; Clay $10,000	Martin Blaško; Peter Vajda; 6–2, 6–2	Alessandro Colella; Pietro Licciardi	Gavin van Peperzeel; Pietro Licciardi	Alessandro Colella; Ivan Kosec; Dmitry Popko; Patrik Fabian
August 3	Spain F24 Futures; Ourense, Spain; Hard $10,000	David Vega Hernández; 6–3, 4–6, 7–5	Ricardo Ojeda Lara	Andrés Artuñedo; Borja Rodríguez-Manzano	Marc Fornell; Pedro Martínez; Max Tchoutakian; Tiago Cação
August 3	Spain F24 Futures; Ourense, Spain; Hard $10,000	David Vega Hernández; Ricardo Villacorta-Alonso; 3–6, 6–3, [10–4]	Marc Fornell; Marco Neubau	Andrés Artuñedo; Borja Rodríguez-Manzano	Marc Fornell; Pedro Martínez; Max Tchoutakian; Tiago Cação
August 3	Tunisia F17 Futures; Tunis, Tunisia; Clay $10,000	Tak Khunn Wang; 6–3, 6–1	Anis Ghorbel	Cristóbal Saavedra; Alexandre Müller	Skander Mansouri; Ricardo Urzúa-Rivera; Dante Gennaro; Francesco Garzelli
August 3	Tunisia F17 Futures; Tunis, Tunisia; Clay $10,000	Cristóbal Saavedra; Ricardo Urzúa-Rivera; 3–6, 6–4, [10–6]	Dante Gennaro; Eduardo Agustín Torre	Cristóbal Saavedra; Alexandre Müller	Skander Mansouri; Ricardo Urzúa-Rivera; Dante Gennaro; Francesco Garzelli
August 3	Turkey F31 Futures; Istanbul, Turkey; Hard $10,000	Aleksandre Metreveli; 6–2, 5–2 retired	Jordi Vives	Bradley Mousley; Anıl Yüksel	Nicolás Alberto Arreche; Daniel Glancy; Isaac Frost; Sarp Ağabigün
August 3	Turkey F31 Futures; Istanbul, Turkey; Hard $10,000	Daniel Glancy; Alexander Igoshin; 6–4, 6–3	Sarp Ağabigün; Muhammet Haylaz	Bradley Mousley; Anıl Yüksel	Nicolás Alberto Arreche; Daniel Glancy; Isaac Frost; Sarp Ağabigün
August 10	Argentina F8 Futures; Buenos Aires, Argentina; Clay $15,000	Hernán Casanova; 6–3, 6–1	Juan Ignacio Galarza	Facundo Mena; Patricio Heras	José Pereira; Andrea Collarini; Gabriel Alejandro Hidalgo; Daniel Dutra da Silva
August 10	Argentina F8 Futures; Buenos Aires, Argentina; Clay $15,000	Andrea Collarini; Juan Ignacio Galarza; Walkover	Oscar José Gutierrez; Gabriel Alejandro Hidalgo	Facundo Mena; Patricio Heras	José Pereira; Andrea Collarini; Gabriel Alejandro Hidalgo; Daniel Dutra da Silva
August 10	Belarus F1 Futures; Minsk, Belarus; Hard $15,000	Denys Molchanov; 6–4, 7–5	Egor Gerasimov	Sanjar Fayziev; Daniil Medvedev	Dzmitry Zhyrmont; Dmytro Badanov; Ilya Ivashka; Aleksandre Metreveli
August 10	Belarus F1 Futures; Minsk, Belarus; Hard $15,000	Egor Gerasimov; Ilya Ivashka; 6–3, 6–4	Artur Dubinski; Volodymyr Uzhylovskyi	Sanjar Fayziev; Daniil Medvedev	Dzmitry Zhyrmont; Dmytro Badanov; Ilya Ivashka; Aleksandre Metreveli
August 10	China F13 Futures; Putian, China; Hard $15,000	Lee Duck-hee; 6–2, 6–3	Wu Di	Gong Xiao; Yang Tsung-hua	He Yecong; Bai Yan; Arata Onozawa; Masato Shiga
August 10	China F13 Futures; Putian, China; Hard $15,000	Bai Yan; Yi Chu-huan; 6–2, 7–6^{(7–4)}	Sho Katayama; Bumpei Sato	Gong Xiao; Yang Tsung-hua	He Yecong; Bai Yan; Arata Onozawa; Masato Shiga
August 10	Italy F22 Futures; Appiano, Italy; Clay $15,000+H	Federico Gaio; 6–4, 6–3	Francisco Bahamonde	Michael Linzer; Ricardo Rodríguez	Thomas Fabbiano; Pietro Rondoni; Yannik Reuter; Maverick Banes
August 10	Italy F22 Futures; Appiano, Italy; Clay $15,000+H	Maximilian Neuchrist; Tristan-Samuel Weissborn; 7–5, 4–6, [10–3]	Wilson Leite; Bruno Sant'Anna	Michael Linzer; Ricardo Rodríguez	Thomas Fabbiano; Pietro Rondoni; Yannik Reuter; Maverick Banes
August 10	Romania F12 Futures; Iași, Romania; Clay $15,000	Gerard Granollers; 6–3, 3–6, 7–6^{(7–0)}	Laurynas Grigelis	Roberto Marcora; Maxime Chazal	Vasile Antonescu; Carlos Boluda-Purkiss; Filip Horanský; Claudio Fortuna
August 10	Romania F12 Futures; Iași, Romania; Clay $15,000	Andrei Ștefan Apostol; Nicolae Frunză; 6–2, 3–6, [10–7]	Alexandru-Daniel Carpen; Victor Vlad Cornea	Roberto Marcora; Maxime Chazal	Vasile Antonescu; Carlos Boluda-Purkiss; Filip Horanský; Claudio Fortuna
August 10	Russia F6 Futures; Moscow, Russia; Clay $15,000	Alexey Vatutin; 7–6^{(7–4)}, 6–2	Marc Giner	Ivan Gakhov; Anton Zaitcev	Richard Muzaev; Artem Dubrivnyy; Evgeny Elistratov; Vladyslav Manafov
August 10	Russia F6 Futures; Moscow, Russia; Clay $15,000	Vladyslav Manafov; Anton Zaitcev; 6–2, 6–4	Gleb Alekseenko; Alexander Perfilov	Ivan Gakhov; Anton Zaitcev	Richard Muzaev; Artem Dubrivnyy; Evgeny Elistratov; Vladyslav Manafov
August 10	Thailand F7 Futures; Bangkok, Thailand; Hard $15,000	Jordan Thompson; 6–0, 3–6, 6–2	Chen Ti	Christopher Rungkat; Dane Propoggia	Ryota Tanuma; Sriram Balaji; Benjamin Mitchell; Pruchya Isaro
August 10	Thailand F7 Futures; Bangkok, Thailand; Hard $15,000	Pruchya Isaro; Nuttanon Kadchapanan; 6–4, 7–6^{(7–5)}	Toshihide Matsui; Christopher Rungkat	Christopher Rungkat; Dane Propoggia	Ryota Tanuma; Sriram Balaji; Benjamin Mitchell; Pruchya Isaro
August 10	United States F25 Futures; Champaign, United States; Hard $15,000	Kevin King; 6–3, 6–1	Richard Gabb	Ramkumar Ramanathan; Justin S. Shane	Daniel Garza; Tommy Paul; Reilly Opelka; Alex Rybakov
August 10	United States F25 Futures; Champaign, United States; Hard $15,000	Justin S. Shane; Ryan Shane; 6–1, 7–6^{(7–4)}	Evan King; Kevin King	Ramkumar Ramanathan; Justin S. Shane	Daniel Garza; Tommy Paul; Reilly Opelka; Alex Rybakov
August 10	Austria F7 Futures; Innsbruck, Austria; Clay $10,000	Pascal Brunner; 6–7^{(3–7)}, 6–3, 6–2	Riccardo Sinicropi	Bastian Trinker; Lenny Hampel	Patrick Ofner; Philip Lang; Michal Konečný; Kirill Dmitriev
August 10	Austria F7 Futures; Innsbruck, Austria; Clay $10,000	Pascal Brunner; Lucas Miedler; 6–2, 6–4	Lukas Jastraunig; Philip Lang	Bastian Trinker; Lenny Hampel	Patrick Ofner; Philip Lang; Michal Konečný; Kirill Dmitriev
August 10	Belgium F10 Futures; Koksijde, Belgium; Clay $10,000	Romain Barbosa; 6–4, 6–3	Joris De Loore	Johan Tatlot; Clément Geens	Pedro Sakamoto; Joran Vliegen; Jan Choinski; Julien Dubail
August 10	Belgium F10 Futures; Koksijde, Belgium; Clay $10,000	Sander Gillé; Joran Vliegen; 6–2, 6–1	Evan Hoyt; Toby Martin	Johan Tatlot; Clément Geens	Pedro Sakamoto; Joran Vliegen; Jan Choinski; Julien Dubail
August 10	Egypt F26 Futures; Sharm El Sheikh, Egypt; Hard $10,000	Marko Tepavac; 6–3, 6–2	Alexander Ward	Petros Chrysochos; Lloyd Harris	Tucker Vorster; Santiago Rodríguez Taverna; Daniele Capecchi; Daniel Cox
August 10	Egypt F26 Futures; Sharm El Sheikh, Egypt; Hard $10,000	Olexiy Kolisnyk; Anatoliy Petrenko; 6–4, 2–6, [10–8]	Dan Dowson; Alexander Ward	Petros Chrysochos; Lloyd Harris	Tucker Vorster; Santiago Rodríguez Taverna; Daniele Capecchi; Daniel Cox
August 10	Finland F2 Futures; Hyvinkää, Finland; Clay $10,000	Gonzalo Lama; 6–2, 6–3	Sam Barry	Lloyd Glasspool; Jacob Adaktusson	Baptiste Crepatte; Aleksandr Vasilenko; Romain Arneodo; Eero Vasa
August 10	Finland F2 Futures; Hyvinkää, Finland; Clay $10,000	Lloyd Glasspool; Mikael Torpegaard; 7–6^{(7–3)}, 6–2	Romain Arneodo; Maxime Janvier	Lloyd Glasspool; Jacob Adaktusson	Baptiste Crepatte; Aleksandr Vasilenko; Romain Arneodo; Eero Vasa
August 10	Germany F11 Futures; Friedberg, Germany; Clay $10,000	Yannick Hanfmann; 6–2, 6–2	Gavin van Peperzeel	Daniel Masur; Kevin Krawietz	Oscar Otte; Florian Fallert; Peter Heller; Lukas Finzelberg
August 10	Germany F11 Futures; Friedberg, Germany; Clay $10,000	Johannes Härteis; Kevin Krawietz; 6–3, 6–7^{(5–7)}, [11–9]	Jakob Sude; George von Massow	Daniel Masur; Kevin Krawietz	Oscar Otte; Florian Fallert; Peter Heller; Lukas Finzelberg
August 10	Korea F3 Futures; Gimcheon, Korea; Hard $10,000	Na Jung-woong; 6–3, 6–1	Chung Yun-seong	Makoto Ochi; Hong Seong-chan	Seol Jae-min; Jeong Young-hoon; Song Min-kyu; Choi Jae-won
August 10	Korea F3 Futures; Gimcheon, Korea; Hard $10,000	Choi Jae-won; Moon Ju-hae; 6–1, 6–4	Kim Cheong-eui; Seol Jae-min	Makoto Ochi; Hong Seong-chan	Seol Jae-min; Jeong Young-hoon; Song Min-kyu; Choi Jae-won
August 10	Poland F1 Futures; Koszalin, Poland; Clay $10,000	Michal Schmid; 6–3, 7–6^{(7–3)}	Maciej Rajski	Nico Matic; Dušan Lojda	Adria Mas Mascolo; Petr Michnev; Zdeněk Kolář; Piotr Łomacki
August 10	Poland F1 Futures; Koszalin, Poland; Clay $10,000	Marcin Gawron; Grzegorz Panfil; 6–0, 6–4	Zdeněk Kolář; Petr Michnev	Nico Matic; Dušan Lojda	Adria Mas Mascolo; Petr Michnev; Zdeněk Kolář; Piotr Łomacki
August 10	Serbia F8 Futures; Novi Sad, Serbia; Clay $10,000	Alessandro Luisi; 6–4, 4–2 retired	Yanaïs Laurent	Petar Čonkić; Franjo Raspudić	François-Arthur Vibert; Jérôme Inzerillo; Martin Blaško; Pirmin Hänle
August 10	Serbia F8 Futures; Novi Sad, Serbia; Clay $10,000	Martin Blaško; Nino Serdarušić; 6–4, 6–4	Filip Doležel; Dominik Kellovský	Petar Čonkić; Franjo Raspudić	François-Arthur Vibert; Jérôme Inzerillo; Martin Blaško; Pirmin Hänle
August 10	Spain F25 Futures; Béjar, Spain; Hard $10,000+H	Pablo Vivero González; 6–2, 6–2	David Vega Hernández	Jorge Hernando-Ruano; Roberto Ortega Olmedo	Quentin Halys; Federico Zeballos; Carlos Gómez-Herrera; Ricardo Ojeda Lara
August 10	Spain F25 Futures; Béjar, Spain; Hard $10,000+H	Andrés Artuñedo; Ricardo Ojeda Lara; 6–7^{(4–7)}, 6–3, [10–5]	Iván Arenas-Gualda; Jorge Hernando-Ruano	Jorge Hernando-Ruano; Roberto Ortega Olmedo	Quentin Halys; Federico Zeballos; Carlos Gómez-Herrera; Ricardo Ojeda Lara
August 10	Tunisia F18 Futures; Tunis, Tunisia; Clay $10,000	Omar Giacalone; 6–1, 6–2	David Pérez Sanz	Ivan Nedelko; Cristóbal Saavedra	Ronan Joncour; Tomislav Jotovski; Eduardo Agustín Torre; Nicolás Alberto Arreche
August 10	Tunisia F18 Futures; Tunis, Tunisia; Clay $10,000	Ronan Joncour; Mandresy Rakotomalala; 6–3, 6–4	Jordi Muñoz Abreu; David Pérez Sanz	Ivan Nedelko; Cristóbal Saavedra	Ronan Joncour; Tomislav Jotovski; Eduardo Agustín Torre; Nicolás Alberto Arreche
August 10	Turkey F32 Futures; Sakarya, Turkey; Hard $10,000	Yannick Jankovits; 6–4, 6–4	Grégoire Jacq	Benjamin Bonzi; Altuğ Çelikbilek	Jonathan Kanar; Jeevan Nedunchezhiyan; Isaac Frost; Stefano Napolitano
August 10	Turkey F32 Futures; Sakarya, Turkey; Hard $10,000	Benjamin Bonzi; Grégoire Jacq; 6–1, 6–2	Yannai Barkai; Alon Elia	Benjamin Bonzi; Altuğ Çelikbilek	Jonathan Kanar; Jeevan Nedunchezhiyan; Isaac Frost; Stefano Napolitano
August 17	Belarus F2 Futures; Minsk, Belarus; Hard $15,000	Sébastien Boltz; 2–6, 6–4, 6–2	Amir Weintraub	Denys Molchanov; Egor Gerasimov	Denis Yevseyev; Sergey Betov; Zhang Zhizhen; Daniil Medvedev
August 17	Belarus F2 Futures; Minsk, Belarus; Hard $15,000	Egor Gerasimov; Ilya Ivashka; 6–1, 6–3	Daniil Medvedev; Zhang Zhizhen	Denys Molchanov; Egor Gerasimov	Denis Yevseyev; Sergey Betov; Zhang Zhizhen; Daniil Medvedev
August 17	Brazil F4 Futures; Belém, Brazil; Hard $15,000+H	Carlos Eduardo Severino; 4–6, 7–6^{(7–3)}, 6–1	Daniel Dutra da Silva	Emilio Gómez; José Pereira	Christian Lindell; João Domingues; Ricardo Hocevar; André Miele
August 17	Brazil F4 Futures; Belém, Brazil; Hard $15,000+H	Emilio Gómez; Igor Marcondes; 6–7^{(5–7)}, 7–6^{(7–3)}, [16–14]	André Miele; Alexandre Tsuchiya	Emilio Gómez; José Pereira	Christian Lindell; João Domingues; Ricardo Hocevar; André Miele
August 17	Chinese Taipei F1 Futures; Kaohsiung, Chinese Taipei; Hard $15,000	Yang Tsung-hua; 4–6, 6–4, 1–0 retired	Bai Yan	Issei Okamura; Dane Propoggia	Alexios Halebian; Ryota Tanuma; Kento Takeuchi; Lee Kuan-yi
August 17	Chinese Taipei F1 Futures; Kaohsiung, Chinese Taipei; Hard $15,000	Hsieh Cheng-peng; Yang Tsung-hua; 6–4, 7–6^{(7–5)}	Bai Yan; Yi Chu-huan	Issei Okamura; Dane Propoggia	Alexios Halebian; Ryota Tanuma; Kento Takeuchi; Lee Kuan-yi
August 17	Italy F23 Futures; Este, Italy; Clay $15,000+H	Francisco Bahamonde; 6–4, 6–3	Orlando Luz	Ricardo Rodríguez; Gerard Granollers	Salvatore Caruso; Viktor Durasovic; Ivan Bjelica; Maxime Chazal
August 17	Italy F23 Futures; Este, Italy; Clay $15,000+H	Maximilian Neuchrist; Tristan-Samuel Weissborn; 2–6, 6–3, [10–8]	Rafael Matos; Marcelo Zormann	Ricardo Rodríguez; Gerard Granollers	Salvatore Caruso; Viktor Durasovic; Ivan Bjelica; Maxime Chazal
August 17	Netherlands F5 Futures; Oldenzaal, Netherlands; Clay $15,000	Gianluigi Quinzi; 7–5, 2–0 retired	Jesse Huta Galung	Gonçalo Oliveira; Geoffrey Blancaneaux	Sam Barry; Colin van Beem; Alexey Vatutin; Constant Lestienne
August 17	Netherlands F5 Futures; Oldenzaal, Netherlands; Clay $15,000	Pedro Bernardi; Gonçalo Oliveira; 6–2, 6–4	Sam Barry; Niels Lootsma	Gonçalo Oliveira; Geoffrey Blancaneaux	Sam Barry; Colin van Beem; Alexey Vatutin; Constant Lestienne
August 17	Poland F2 Futures; Bydgoszcz, Poland; Clay $15,000	Axel Michon; 6–3, 6–4	Marcin Gawron	Markus Eriksson; Dušan Lojda	Adam Majchrowicz; Maciej Rajski; Francesco Picco; Gianluca Mager
August 17	Poland F2 Futures; Bydgoszcz, Poland; Clay $15,000	Karol Drzewiecki; Maciej Smoła; 7–6^{(7–4)}, 5–7, [10–8]	Eduardo Dischinger; Bruno Sant'Anna	Markus Eriksson; Dušan Lojda	Adam Majchrowicz; Maciej Rajski; Francesco Picco; Gianluca Mager
August 17	Argentina F9 Futures; Chaco, Argentina; Clay $10,000	Juan Ignacio Galarza; 6–4, 3–6, 6–4	Patricio Heras	Gonzalo Villanueva; Hernán Casanova	Franco Agamenone; Martín Cuevas; Gabriel Alejandro Hidalgo; Andrea Collarini
August 17	Argentina F9 Futures; Chaco, Argentina; Clay $10,000	Franco Agamenone; Patricio Heras; 6–4, 6–0	Hernán Casanova; Juan Pablo Ficovich	Gonzalo Villanueva; Hernán Casanova	Franco Agamenone; Martín Cuevas; Gabriel Alejandro Hidalgo; Andrea Collarini
August 17	Austria F8 Futures; Vogau, Austria; Clay $10,000	Dmitry Popko; 6–0, 6–2	Sebastian Ofner	Patrick Ofner; Kirill Dmitriev	Lenny Hampel; Caio Silva; Jan Poskocil; Tomislav Ternar
August 17	Austria F8 Futures; Vogau, Austria; Clay $10,000	Luca Margaroli; Lucas Miedler; 7–6^{(7–4)}, 5–7, [10–5]	Pascal Brunner; Kirill Dmitriev	Patrick Ofner; Kirill Dmitriev	Lenny Hampel; Caio Silva; Jan Poskocil; Tomislav Ternar
August 17	Belgium F11 Futures; Jupille-sur-Meuse, Belgium; Clay $10,000	Clément Geens; 6–3, 6–4	Christopher Heyman	Joran Vliegen; Jonas Merckx	Julien Dubail; Oscar Otte; Toby Martin; Omar Salman
August 17	Belgium F11 Futures; Jupille-sur-Meuse, Belgium; Clay $10,000	Sander Gillé; Joran Vliegen; 6–1, 6–4	Evan Hoyt; Toby Martin	Joran Vliegen; Jonas Merckx	Julien Dubail; Oscar Otte; Toby Martin; Omar Salman
August 17	Egypt F27 Futures; Sharm El Sheikh, Egypt; Hard $10,000	Lloyd Harris; 6–2, 6–2	Daniel Cox	Tucker Vorster; Lý Hoàng Nam	Felipe Mantilla; Duncan Mugabe; Barış Ergüden; Issam Haitham Taweel
August 17	Egypt F27 Futures; Sharm El Sheikh, Egypt; Hard $10,000	Lloyd Harris; Cameron Silverman; 7–6^{(7–4)}, 6–2	Libor Salaba; Milos Sekulic	Tucker Vorster; Lý Hoàng Nam	Felipe Mantilla; Duncan Mugabe; Barış Ergüden; Issam Haitham Taweel
August 17	Finland F3 Futures; Helsinki, Finland; Clay $10,000	Lennert van der Linden; 7–6^{(7–2)}, 6–2	Maxime Janvier	Carl Söderlund; Daniel Appelgren	Micke Kontinen; Aleksandr Vasilenko; Mikael Torpegaard; Eero Vasa
August 17	Finland F3 Futures; Helsinki, Finland; Clay $10,000	Herkko Pöllänen; Mikael Torpegaard; 6–3, 6–0	Demian Raab; Lennert van der Linden	Carl Söderlund; Daniel Appelgren	Micke Kontinen; Aleksandr Vasilenko; Mikael Torpegaard; Eero Vasa
August 17	Germany F12 Futures; Karlsruhe, Germany; Clay $10,000	Javier Martí; 6–1, 6–2	Sandro Ehrat	Hannes Wagner; Dennis Blömke	Johannes Härteis; Karim-Mohamed Maamoun; Vladyslav Manafov; Robin Kern
August 17	Germany F12 Futures; Karlsruhe, Germany; Clay $10,000	Johannes Härteis; Hannes Wagner; 7–6^{(7–5)}, 3–6, [10–5]	Vladyslav Manafov; Laslo Urrutia Fuentes	Hannes Wagner; Dennis Blömke	Johannes Härteis; Karim-Mohamed Maamoun; Vladyslav Manafov; Robin Kern
August 17	Korea F4 Futures; Gimcheon, Korea; Hard $10,000	Yusuke Watanuki; 7–5, 6–4	Na Jung-woong	Chung Yun-seong; Cho Min-hyeok	Kim Jae-hwan; Nam Ji-sung; Choi Dong-whee; Kim Cheong-eui
August 17	Korea F4 Futures; Gimcheon, Korea; Hard $10,000	Lee Jea-moon; Daniel Yoo; 6–7^{(4–7)}, 7–6^{(7–5)}, [10–8]	Kim Cheong-eui; Noh Sang-woo	Chung Yun-seong; Cho Min-hyeok	Kim Jae-hwan; Nam Ji-sung; Choi Dong-whee; Kim Cheong-eui
August 17	Romania F13 Futures; Mediaș, Romania; Clay $10,000	Laurynas Grigelis; 6–2, 6–3	Dragoș Dima	Carlos Boluda-Purkiss; Péter Nagy	Viktor Galović; Petru-Alexandru Luncanu; Claudio Fortuna; Ljubomir Čelebić
August 17	Romania F13 Futures; Mediaș, Romania; Clay $10,000	Claudio Fortuna; Laurynas Grigelis; 6–3, 6–1	Carlos Boluda-Purkiss; Alessandro Colella	Carlos Boluda-Purkiss; Péter Nagy	Viktor Galović; Petru-Alexandru Luncanu; Claudio Fortuna; Ljubomir Čelebić
August 17	Serbia F9 Futures; Novi Sad, Serbia; Clay $10,000	Antonio Massara; 6–4, 6–4	Miki Janković	Filip Veger; Jérôme Inzerillo	Marco Bortolotti; Danilo Petrović; Dominik Süč; Václav Šafránek
August 17	Serbia F9 Futures; Novi Sad, Serbia; Clay $10,000	Ivan Sabanov; Matej Sabanov; 6–3, 6–0	Fabio Mercuri; Luca Pancaldi	Filip Veger; Jérôme Inzerillo	Marco Bortolotti; Danilo Petrović; Dominik Süč; Václav Šafránek
August 17	Spain F26 Futures; Vigo, Spain; Clay $10,000	Ricardo Ojeda Lara; 7–6^{(7–3)}, 6–1	Juan Lizariturry	David Vega Hernández; Jean-Marc Werner	Albert Alcaraz Ivorra; Mario Vilella Martínez; Pedro Martínez; Marc Giner
August 17	Spain F26 Futures; Vigo, Spain; Clay $10,000	Sergio Martos Gornés; Pol Toledo Bagué; 6–4, 6–3	Eduard Esteve Lobato; Pedro Martínez	David Vega Hernández; Jean-Marc Werner	Albert Alcaraz Ivorra; Mario Vilella Martínez; Pedro Martínez; Marc Giner
August 17	Switzerland F3 Futures; Geneva, Switzerland; Clay $10,000	Roberto Marcora; 6–4, 6–2	Nikola Milojević	Steven Diez; Tobias Simon	Johan Nikles; Samuel Bensoussan; Alex Molčan; Pascal Meis
August 17	Switzerland F3 Futures; Geneva, Switzerland; Clay $10,000	Pirmin Hänle; Pascal Meis; 6–2, 3–6, [10–8]	Loïc Perret; Siméon Rossier	Steven Diez; Tobias Simon	Johan Nikles; Samuel Bensoussan; Alex Molčan; Pascal Meis
August 17	Tunisia F19 Futures; Port El Kantaoui, Tunisia; Hard $10,000	Dimitar Kuzmanov; Walkover	Ivan Nedelko	Samuel Ribeiro Navarrete; David Pérez Sanz	André Gaspar Murta; Artur Completo; Mandresy Rakotomalala; Milen Ianakiev
August 17	Tunisia F19 Futures; Port El Kantaoui, Tunisia; Hard $10,000	Milen Ianakiev; Alexander Merino; 7–5, 1–6, [10–5]	Dimitar Kuzmanov; David Pérez Sanz	Samuel Ribeiro Navarrete; David Pérez Sanz	André Gaspar Murta; Artur Completo; Mandresy Rakotomalala; Milen Ianakiev
August 17	Turkey F33 Futures; İzmir, Turkey; Clay $10,000	Benjamin Bonzi; 7–6^{(7–2)}, 7–5	Cem İlkel	Bradley Mousley; Matthias Wunner	Stefano Napolitano; Altuğ Çelikbilek; Federico Zeballos; Filippo Baldi
August 17	Turkey F33 Futures; İzmir, Turkey; Clay $10,000	Jordi Vives; Federico Zeballos; 7–6^{(7–0)}, 6–7^{(6–8)}, [10–7]	Benjamin Bonzi; Grégoire Jacq	Bradley Mousley; Matthias Wunner	Stefano Napolitano; Altuğ Çelikbilek; Federico Zeballos; Filippo Baldi
August 24	Brazil F5 Futures; São José do Rio Preto, Brazil; Clay $15,000	Carlos Eduardo Severino; 6–4, 6–7^{(4–7)}, 6–3	Daniel Dutra da Silva	Thales Turini; Pedro Sakamoto	José Pereira; Alexandre Tsuchiya; Fabrício Neis; Emilio Gómez
August 24	Brazil F5 Futures; São José do Rio Preto, Brazil; Clay $15,000	Fabrício Neis; João Pedro Sorgi; 3–6, 6–4, [12–10]	André Miele; Alexandre Tsuchiya	Thales Turini; Pedro Sakamoto	José Pereira; Alexandre Tsuchiya; Fabrício Neis; Emilio Gómez
August 24	Canada F7 Futures; Winnipeg, Canada; Hard $15,000	Gonzalo Escobar; 7–6^{(7–4)}, 6–0	Fritz Wolmarans	Filip Peliwo; Alex Rybakov	Dimitar Kutrovsky; Tigre Hank; Mico Santiago; Dennis Nevolo
August 24	Canada F7 Futures; Winnipeg, Canada; Hard $15,000	Luis David Martínez; Luis Patiño; 6–4, 6–3	Gonzalo Escobar; Sora Fukuda	Filip Peliwo; Alex Rybakov	Dimitar Kutrovsky; Tigre Hank; Mico Santiago; Dennis Nevolo
August 24	Chinese Taipei F2 Futures; Kaohsiung, Chinese Taipei; Hard $15,000	Bai Yan; 6–3, 6–4	Yang Tsung-hua	Makoto Ochi; Yi Chu-huan	Alexios Halebian; Hsieh Cheng-peng; Liang Wen-chun; Yu Cheng-yu
August 24	Chinese Taipei F2 Futures; Kaohsiung, Chinese Taipei; Hard $15,000	Cancelled		Makoto Ochi; Yi Chu-huan	Alexios Halebian; Hsieh Cheng-peng; Liang Wen-chun; Yu Cheng-yu
August 24	Gabon F1 Futures; Libreville, Gabon; Hard $15,000	Tucker Vorster; 7–6^{(7–2)}, 4–6, 6–2	Jaime Pulgar-García	Antoine Escoffier; Nicolaas Scholtz	Cameron Silverman; Arthur Surreaux; Michael Grant; Javier Pulgar-García
August 24	Gabon F1 Futures; Libreville, Gabon; Hard $15,000	Antoine Escoffier; Jaime Pulgar-García; 7–5, 3–6, [10–8]	Javier Pulgar-García; Cameron Silverman	Antoine Escoffier; Nicolaas Scholtz	Cameron Silverman; Arthur Surreaux; Michael Grant; Javier Pulgar-García
August 24	Italy F24 Futures; Piombino, Italy; Hard $15,000	Quentin Halys; 6–3, 6–4	Edoardo Eremin	Sébastien Boltz; Alessandro Bega	Gianluca Di Nicola; James Marsalek; David Rice; Daniele Capecchi
August 24	Italy F24 Futures; Piombino, Italy; Hard $15,000	Mark Vervoort; Ilija Vučić; 7–6^{(8–6)}, 6–2	Jacopo Stefanini; Andrea Vavassori	Sébastien Boltz; Alessandro Bega	Gianluca Di Nicola; James Marsalek; David Rice; Daniele Capecchi
August 24	Netherlands F6 Futures; Rotterdam, Netherlands; Clay $15,000	Constant Lestienne; 6–0, 6–4	Alexey Vatutin	Yannick Maden; Sam Barry	Jan Choinski; Gianluigi Quinzi; Gleb Sakharov; Jesse Huta Galung
August 24	Netherlands F6 Futures; Rotterdam, Netherlands; Clay $15,000	Wesley Koolhof; Matwé Middelkoop; 6–3, 6–3	Oscar Otte; Matthias Wunner	Yannick Maden; Sam Barry	Jan Choinski; Gianluigi Quinzi; Gleb Sakharov; Jesse Huta Galung
August 24	Poland F3 Futures; Poznań, Poland; Clay $15,000	Axel Michon; 6–0, 7–6^{(8–6)}	Marek Michalička	Andriej Kapaś; Zdeněk Kolář	Marcin Gawron; Dušan Lojda; Andrea Basso; Paweł Ciaś
August 24	Poland F3 Futures; Poznań, Poland; Clay $15,000	Adam Majchrowicz; Jan Zieliński; 6–0, 5–7, [10–2]	Markus Eriksson; Daniel Windahl	Andriej Kapaś; Zdeněk Kolář	Marcin Gawron; Dušan Lojda; Andrea Basso; Paweł Ciaś
August 24	Argentina F10 Futures; Posadas, Argentina; Clay $10,000+H	Patricio Heras; 6–4, 7–6^{(7–2)}	Michel Vernier	Hernán Casanova; Ryusei Makiguchi	Kaichi Uchida; Oscar José Gutierrez; Juan Ignacio Galarza; Andrea Collarini
August 24	Argentina F10 Futures; Posadas, Argentina; Clay $10,000+H	Oscar José Gutierrez; Gabriel Alejandro Hidalgo; 6–3, 6–4	Dante Gennaro; Juan Pablo Paz	Hernán Casanova; Ryusei Makiguchi	Kaichi Uchida; Oscar José Gutierrez; Juan Ignacio Galarza; Andrea Collarini
August 24	Austria F9 Futures; Pörtschach am Wörthersee, Austria; Clay $10,000	Bastian Trinker; 6–4, 6–3	Lucas Miedler	Dmitry Popko; Pascal Brunner	Kevin Krawietz; Kirill Dmitriev; Peter Goldsteiner; Sebastian Ofner
August 24	Austria F9 Futures; Pörtschach am Wörthersee, Austria; Clay $10,000	Kirill Dmitriev; Lucas Miedler; 6–2, 7–5	Kevin Krawietz; Luca Margaroli	Dmitry Popko; Pascal Brunner	Kevin Krawietz; Kirill Dmitriev; Peter Goldsteiner; Sebastian Ofner
August 24	Belgium F12 Futures; Ostend, Belgium; Clay $10,000	Gonzalo Lama; 6–3, 7–6^{(9–7)}	Marvin Netuschil	Clément Geens; Antoine Hoang	Carlos Taberner; Joris De Loore; Florent Diep; Billy Harris
August 24	Belgium F12 Futures; Ostend, Belgium; Clay $10,000	Antoine Hoang; Joran Vliegen; 6–2, 7–5	Kevin Benning; Jonas Merckx	Clément Geens; Antoine Hoang	Carlos Taberner; Joris De Loore; Florent Diep; Billy Harris
August 24	Egypt F28 Futures; Sharm El Sheikh, Egypt; Hard $10,000	Yannick Jankovits; 6–4, 5–7, 6–4	Libor Salaba	Benjamin Bonzi; Barış Ergüden	Ugo Nastasi; Issam Haitham Taweel; Grégoire Jacq; Joshua Milton
August 24	Egypt F28 Futures; Sharm El Sheikh, Egypt; Hard $10,000	Libor Salaba; Milos Sekulic; 6–2, 6–2	Yannick Jankovits; Ugo Nastasi	Benjamin Bonzi; Barış Ergüden	Ugo Nastasi; Issam Haitham Taweel; Grégoire Jacq; Joshua Milton
August 24	Germany F13 Futures; Überlingen, Germany; Clay $10,000	Daniel Masur; 6–1, 6–4	Laslo Urrutia Fuentes	Marc Sieber; Jeremy Jahn	Gerard Granollers; Eduard Esteve Lobato; Adrian Obert; Tobias Simon
August 24	Germany F13 Futures; Überlingen, Germany; Clay $10,000	Johannes Härteis; Hannes Wagner; 4–6, 6–3, [10–5]	Jeremy Jahn; Tom Schönenberg	Marc Sieber; Jeremy Jahn	Gerard Granollers; Eduard Esteve Lobato; Adrian Obert; Tobias Simon
August 24	India F11 Futures; Chennai, India; Hard $10,000	Sumit Nagal; 6–3, 6–4	Ronit Singh Bisht	Prajnesh Gunneswaran; Ranjeet Virali-Murugesan	Sidharth Rawat; Jeevan Nedunchezhiyan; S D Prajwal Dev; Sriram Balaji
August 24	India F11 Futures; Chennai, India; Hard $10,000	Jeevan Nedunchezhiyan; Vijay Sundar Prashanth; 6–4, 7–6^{(7–5)}	Mohit Mayur Jayaprakash; Vinayak Sharma Kaza	Prajnesh Gunneswaran; Ranjeet Virali-Murugesan	Sidharth Rawat; Jeevan Nedunchezhiyan; S D Prajwal Dev; Sriram Balaji
August 24	Korea F5 Futures; Gimcheon, Korea; Hard $10,000	Chung Hong; 6–3, 6–4	Cho Min-hyeok	Hiromasa Oku; Nam Ji-sung	Kim Cheong-eui; Song Min-kyu; Yusuke Watanuki; Hong Seong-chan
August 24	Korea F5 Futures; Gimcheon, Korea; Hard $10,000	Nam Ji-sung; Noh Sang-woo; 6–3, 7–6^{(7–3)}	Gengo Kikuchi; Shunrou Takeshima	Hiromasa Oku; Nam Ji-sung	Kim Cheong-eui; Song Min-kyu; Yusuke Watanuki; Hong Seong-chan
August 24	Romania F14 Futures; Bucharest, Romania; Clay $10,000	Carlos Boluda-Purkiss; 6–4, 3–6, 6–4	Mario Vilella Martínez	Dragoș Dima; Filippo Leonardi	Gabriel Petit; Vasile Antonescu; Nicolae Frunză; Viktor Galović
August 24	Romania F14 Futures; Bucharest, Romania; Clay $10,000	Victor Vlad Cornea; Stephan Fransen; 6–3, 6–3	Bogdan Borza; Luca George Tatomir	Dragoș Dima; Filippo Leonardi	Gabriel Petit; Vasile Antonescu; Nicolae Frunză; Viktor Galović
August 24	Serbia F10 Futures; Subotica, Serbia; Clay $10,000	Václav Šafránek; 4–6, 7–6^{(7–4)}, 6–1	Marco Bortolotti	Danilo Petrović; Miki Janković	Dejan Katić; Filip Brtnický; Petru-Alexandru Luncanu; Caio Silva
August 24	Serbia F10 Futures; Subotica, Serbia; Clay $10,000	Marco Bortolotti; Pietro Rondoni; 1–6, 6–2, [10–8]	Ivan Sabanov; Matej Sabanov	Danilo Petrović; Miki Janković	Dejan Katić; Filip Brtnický; Petru-Alexandru Luncanu; Caio Silva
August 24	Switzerland F4 Futures; Sion, Switzerland; Clay $10,000	Steven Diez; 5–7, 7–5, 6–1	Federico Coria	Samuel Bensoussan; Hugo Nys	Loïc Perret; Daniel Altmaier; Marcos Giraldi Requena; Nicolas Rosenzweig
August 24	Switzerland F4 Futures; Sion, Switzerland; Clay $10,000	Hugo Nys; Tak Khunn Wang; 6–2, 6–2	Federico Coria; Siméon Rossier	Samuel Bensoussan; Hugo Nys	Loïc Perret; Daniel Altmaier; Marcos Giraldi Requena; Nicolas Rosenzweig
August 24	Tunisia F20 Futures; Port El Kantaoui, Tunisia; Hard $10,000	Dimitar Kuzmanov; 6–4, 6–3	David Pérez Sanz	Aziz Dougaz; Majed Kilani	Christoph Negritu; Matteo Marfia; Vasko Mladenov; Cesar Testoni
August 24	Tunisia F20 Futures; Port El Kantaoui, Tunisia; Hard $10,000	Dimitar Kuzmanov; David Pérez Sanz; 6–3, 6–7^{(3–7)}, [10–7]	Jordan Dyke; Eduardo Agustín Torre	Aziz Dougaz; Majed Kilani	Christoph Negritu; Matteo Marfia; Vasko Mladenov; Cesar Testoni
August 24	Turkey F34 Futures; Antalya, Turkey; Hard $10,000	Michal Konečný; 6–1, 6–2	Miliaan Niesten	Cem İlkel; Julian Ocleppo	Altuğ Çelikbilek; Jorge Montero; Peter Vajda; Vadim Alekseenko
August 24	Turkey F34 Futures; Antalya, Turkey; Hard $10,000	Tuna Altuna; Cem İlkel; 6–0, 6–1	Vadim Alekseenko; Miliaan Niesten	Cem İlkel; Julian Ocleppo	Altuğ Çelikbilek; Jorge Montero; Peter Vajda; Vadim Alekseenko
August 31	Belgium F13 Futures; Arlon, Belgium; Clay $15,000+H	Gonçalo Oliveira; 6–0, 6–3	Clément Geens	Frederico Ferreira Silva; Rubén Ramírez Hidalgo	Jordi Samper Montaña; Florian Fallert; Gleb Sakharov; Laurens Verboven
August 31	Belgium F13 Futures; Arlon, Belgium; Clay $15,000+H	Romain Barbosa; Frederico Ferreira Silva; 6–2, 6–1	Vincent Jaensch-Mueller; Pedro Munafo	Frederico Ferreira Silva; Rubén Ramírez Hidalgo	Jordi Samper Montaña; Florian Fallert; Gleb Sakharov; Laurens Verboven
August 31	Canada F8 Futures; Calgary, Canada; Hard $15,000	Frank Dancevic; 6–4, 6–3	Gonzalo Escobar	Kevin King; Tennys Sandgren	Philip Bester; Tigre Hank; Sanam Singh; Mikael Ymer
August 31	Canada F8 Futures; Calgary, Canada; Hard $15,000	Luis David Martínez; Luis Patiño; 6–4, 4–6, [10–2]	Damon Gooch; Wil Spencer	Kevin King; Tennys Sandgren	Philip Bester; Tigre Hank; Sanam Singh; Mikael Ymer
August 31	Gabon F2 Futures; Libreville, Gabon; Hard $15,000	Nicolaas Scholtz; 6–2, 5–7, 7–5	Javier Pulgar-García	Tucker Vorster; Arthur Surreaux	Michael Grant; Julian Busch; Antoine Escoffier; Jaime Pulgar-García
August 31	Gabon F2 Futures; Libreville, Gabon; Hard $15,000	Nicolaas Scholtz; Tucker Vorster; 7–6^{(7–2)}, 6–1	Javier Pulgar-García; Cameron Silverman	Tucker Vorster; Arthur Surreaux	Michael Grant; Julian Busch; Antoine Escoffier; Jaime Pulgar-García
August 31	Great Britain F8 Futures; Roehampton, Great Britain; Hard $15,000	Quentin Halys; 6–1, 6–7^{(5–7)}, 7–5	Daniel Evans	Marcus Willis; Joshua Milton	Adrien Bossel; Daniel Cox; Daniel Smethurst; Henri Laaksonen
August 31	Great Britain F8 Futures; Roehampton, Great Britain; Hard $15,000	David O'Hare; Joe Salisbury; 6–2, 4–6, [10–5]	Neil Pauffley; David Rice	Marcus Willis; Joshua Milton	Adrien Bossel; Daniel Cox; Daniel Smethurst; Henri Laaksonen
August 31	Russia F7 Futures; Vsevolozhsk, Russia; Clay $15,000	Mikhail Elgin; 6–4, 6–2	Alexey Vatutin	Denys Molchanov; Dmitry Popko	Alexander Bublik; Vladimir Ivanov; Ricardo Rodríguez; Maxim Ratniuk
August 31	Russia F7 Futures; Vsevolozhsk, Russia; Clay $15,000	Denys Molchanov; Yaraslav Shyla; 6–2, 7–6^{(7–3)}	Alexander Bublik; Richard Muzaev	Denys Molchanov; Dmitry Popko	Alexander Bublik; Vladimir Ivanov; Ricardo Rodríguez; Maxim Ratniuk
August 31	Austria F10 Futures; Sankt Pölten, Austria; Clay $10,000	Dennis Novak; 3–6, 6–3, 6–4	Pascal Brunner	Tristan-Samuel Weissborn; Marc Sieber	Lucas Miedler; Gibril Diarra; Nico Matic; Bastian Trinker
August 31	Austria F10 Futures; Sankt Pölten, Austria; Clay $10,000	Lucas Miedler; Tristan-Samuel Weissborn; 6–3, 6–3	Pascal Brunner; Dennis Novak	Tristan-Samuel Weissborn; Marc Sieber	Lucas Miedler; Gibril Diarra; Nico Matic; Bastian Trinker
August 31	Croatia F14 Futures; Bol, Croatia; Clay $10,000	Alexander Ward; 6–2, 6–3	Miki Janković	Abdullah Maqdes; Péter Nagy	Nerman Fatić; Giovanni Rizzuti; Daniele Giorgini; Sander Gillé
August 31	Croatia F14 Futures; Bol, Croatia; Clay $10,000	Rafael Matos; Marcelo Zormann; 6–3, 2–6, [10–5]	Gábor Borsos; Ádám Kellner	Abdullah Maqdes; Péter Nagy	Nerman Fatić; Giovanni Rizzuti; Daniele Giorgini; Sander Gillé
August 31	Egypt F29 Futures; Sharm El Sheikh, Egypt; Hard $10,000	Libor Salaba; 6–2, 1–6, 6–3	Alessandro Bega	Yannick Jankovits; Denys Mylokostov	Francesco Vilardo; Barış Ergüden; Federico Zeballos; Ugo Nastasi
August 31	Egypt F29 Futures; Sharm El Sheikh, Egypt; Hard $10,000	Libor Salaba; Milos Sekulic; 6–2, 6–2	Gustavo Guerses; Duncan Mugabe	Yannick Jankovits; Denys Mylokostov	Francesco Vilardo; Barış Ergüden; Federico Zeballos; Ugo Nastasi
August 31	India F12 Futures; Chennai, India; Hard $10,000	Jeevan Nedunchezhiyan; 7–6^{(10–8)}, 6–4	Prajnesh Gunneswaran	Vinayak Sharma Kaza; Sidharth Rawat	Vijay Sundar Prashanth; Sumit Nagal; Borja Rodríguez Manzano; Mohit Mayur Jayaprakash
August 31	India F12 Futures; Chennai, India; Hard $10,000	Jeevan Nedunchezhiyan; Vijay Sundar Prashanth; 4–6, 6–3, [10–4]	Markos Kalovelonis; Timur Khabibulin	Vinayak Sharma Kaza; Sidharth Rawat	Vijay Sundar Prashanth; Sumit Nagal; Borja Rodríguez Manzano; Mohit Mayur Jayaprakash
August 31	Iran F7 Futures; Tehran, Iran; Clay $10,000	Maxime Janvier; 6–2, 6–4	Toni Androić	François-Arthur Vibert; Ivan Nedelko	Paul Monteban; Christoffer Solberg; Thomas Fancutt; Gabriel Petit
August 31	Iran F7 Futures; Tehran, Iran; Clay $10,000	Maxime Janvier; Gabriel Petit; 7–6^{(7–3)}, 6–1	Thomas Fancutt; Amirvala Madanchi	François-Arthur Vibert; Ivan Nedelko	Paul Monteban; Christoffer Solberg; Thomas Fancutt; Gabriel Petit
August 31	Israel F11 Futures; Kiryat Gat, Israel; Clay $10,000	Michael Geerts; 6–2, 6–4	Evan Song	Peter Kobelt; Bar Tzuf Botzer	Stefano Napolitano; Edan Leshem; Alon Elia; Evgeny Karlovskiy
August 31	Israel F11 Futures; Kiryat Gat, Israel; Clay $10,000	Jarryd Chaplin; Ben McLachlan; 7–6^{(7–2)}, 6–2	Mor Bulis; Edan Leshem	Peter Kobelt; Bar Tzuf Botzer	Stefano Napolitano; Edan Leshem; Alon Elia; Evgeny Karlovskiy
August 31	Italy F25 Futures; Duino-Aurisina, Italy; Clay $10,000	Riccardo Bellotti; 6–3, 3–6, 6–2	Francesco Picco	Javier Martí; Pietro Rondoni	Nino Serdarušić; Cristóbal Saavedra; Nicola Ghedin; Alessandro Colella
August 31	Italy F25 Futures; Duino-Aurisina, Italy; Clay $10,000	Nicola Ghedin; Federico Maccari; 7–6^{(7–4)}, 2–6, [10–8]	Francesco Borgo; Alessandro Colella	Javier Martí; Pietro Rondoni	Nino Serdarušić; Cristóbal Saavedra; Nicola Ghedin; Alessandro Colella
August 31	Korea F6 Futures; Anseong, Korea; Clay (indoor) $10,000	Cho Min-hyeok; 6–7^{(5–7)}, 6–2, 6–4	Na Jung-woong	Dayne Kelly; Makoto Ochi	Kim Cheong-eui; Chung Hong; Arata Onozawa; Nam Ji-sung
August 31	Korea F6 Futures; Anseong, Korea; Clay (indoor) $10,000	Kwon Soon-woo; Son Ji-hoon; 6–7^{(4–7)}, 6–3, [13–11]	Nam Ji-sung; Noh Sang-woo	Dayne Kelly; Makoto Ochi	Kim Cheong-eui; Chung Hong; Arata Onozawa; Nam Ji-sung
August 31	Poland F4 Futures; Bytom, Poland; Clay $10,000	Bastián Malla; 6–4, 6–3	Paweł Ciaś	Grzegorz Panfil; Maciej Rajski	Markus Eriksson; Jānis Podžus; Jan Zieliński; Václav Šafránek
August 31	Poland F4 Futures; Bytom, Poland; Clay $10,000	Jan Kunčík; Petr Michnev; 5–7, 7–5, [10–8]	Hubert Hurkacz; Szymon Walków	Grzegorz Panfil; Maciej Rajski	Markus Eriksson; Jānis Podžus; Jan Zieliński; Václav Šafránek
August 31	Romania F15 Futures; Brașov, Romania; Clay $10,000	Victor Crivoi; 7–5, 6–1	Teodor-Dacian Crăciun	Vadim Alekseenko; Stephan Fransen	Mario Vilella Martínez; Petru-Alexandru Luncanu; Alessandro Luisi; Lukas Mugevičius
August 31	Romania F15 Futures; Brașov, Romania; Clay $10,000	Petru-Alexandru Luncanu; Lukas Mugevičius; 6–4, 4–6, [10–6]	Andrei Ștefan Apostol; Nicolae Frunză	Vadim Alekseenko; Stephan Fransen	Mario Vilella Martínez; Petru-Alexandru Luncanu; Alessandro Luisi; Lukas Mugevičius
August 31	Switzerland F5 Futures; Lausanne, Switzerland; Clay $10,000	Roberto Marcora; 7–6^{(7–5)}, 6–7^{(2–7)}, 6–4	Cristian Villagrán	Marcos Giraldi Requena; Vullnet Tashi	Romain Arneodo; Luca Margaroli; Daniel Altmaier; Antoine Bellier
August 31	Switzerland F5 Futures; Lausanne, Switzerland; Clay $10,000	Antoine Bellier; Joss Espasandin; 7–5, 3–6, [10–5]	Antoine Baroz; Pascal Meis	Marcos Giraldi Requena; Vullnet Tashi	Romain Arneodo; Luca Margaroli; Daniel Altmaier; Antoine Bellier
August 31	Tunisia F21 Futures; Port El Kantaoui, Tunisia; Hard $10,000	David Pérez Sanz; 6–3, 6–3	Thibault Venturino	Filip Horanský; Vasko Mladenov	Christoph Negritu; Yan Sabanin; Hugo Schott; Anis Ghorbel
August 31	Tunisia F21 Futures; Port El Kantaoui, Tunisia; Hard $10,000	Anis Ghorbel; Vasko Mladenov; 6–2, 6–7^{(6–8)}, [10–6]	Aziz Dougaz; Jordan Dyke	Filip Horanský; Vasko Mladenov	Christoph Negritu; Yan Sabanin; Hugo Schott; Anis Ghorbel
August 31	Turkey F35 Futures; Antalya, Turkey; Hard $10,000	Hiroyasu Ehara; 6–1, 4–0 retired	Peđa Krstin	Matteo Berrettini; Michal Konečný	Miliaan Niesten; Jorge Montero; Jaume Pla Malfeito; Cristopher Kohl
August 31	Turkey F35 Futures; Antalya, Turkey; Hard $10,000	Sarp Ağabigün; Altuğ Çelikbilek; 6–1, 7–6^{(7–5)}	Michal Konečný; Miliaan Niesten	Matteo Berrettini; Michal Konečný	Miliaan Niesten; Jorge Montero; Jaume Pla Malfeito; Cristopher Kohl

=== September ===
Week of	Tournament	Winner	Runners-up	Semifinalists	Quarterfinalists
September 7	Canada F9 Futures; Toronto, Canada; Clay $15,000	Frank Dancevic; 7–5, 6–2	Tennys Sandgren	Chase Buchanan; Nathan Pasha	Wil Spencer; Sekou Bangoura; Sanam Singh; Aleksandar Vukic
September 7	Canada F9 Futures; Toronto, Canada; Clay $15,000	Chase Buchanan; Tennys Sandgren; 6–1, 6–3	Sami Reinwein; Justin S. Shane	Chase Buchanan; Nathan Pasha	Wil Spencer; Sekou Bangoura; Sanam Singh; Aleksandar Vukic
September 7	France F17 Futures; Bagnères-de-Bigorre, France; Hard $15,000+H	Niels Desein; 7–5, 6–3	Grégoire Barrère	Evan King; Maxime Petel	Alexandre Sidorenko; Benjamin Bonzi; Laurent Rochette; Alexis Gautier
September 7	France F17 Futures; Bagnères-de-Bigorre, France; Hard $15,000+H	Tom Jomby; Mick Lescure; 4–6, 6–3, [10–4]	Grégoire Barrère; Alexandre Sidorenko	Evan King; Maxime Petel	Alexandre Sidorenko; Benjamin Bonzi; Laurent Rochette; Alexis Gautier
September 7	Great Britain F9 Futures; Nottingham, Great Britain; Hard $15,000	Daniel Evans; 6–7^{(4–7)}, 6–3, 6–1	Daniel Cox	Mate Pavić; Neil Pauffley	Richard Gabb; David Rice; Joshua Ward-Hibbert; Joe Salisbury
September 7	Great Britain F9 Futures; Nottingham, Great Britain; Hard $15,000	Lloyd Glasspool; Joshua Ward-Hibbert; 6–4, 3–6, [10–7]	Daniel Cox; David Rice	Mate Pavić; Neil Pauffley	Richard Gabb; David Rice; Joshua Ward-Hibbert; Joe Salisbury
September 7	Russia F8 Futures; Vsevolozhsk, Russia; Clay $15,000	Mikhail Elgin; 6–3, 6–3	Egor Gerasimov	Anton Zaitcev; Alexey Vatutin	Denys Molchanov; Timur Razmaitov; Andrey Saveliev; Aleksandr Vasilenko
September 7	Russia F8 Futures; Vsevolozhsk, Russia; Clay $15,000	Volodymyr Uzhylovskyi; Anton Zaitcev; 7–6^{(9–7)}, 6–7^{(2–7)}, [10–4]	Maxim Ratniuk; Andrey Saveliev	Anton Zaitcev; Alexey Vatutin	Denys Molchanov; Timur Razmaitov; Andrey Saveliev; Aleksandr Vasilenko
September 7	Spain F28 Futures; Oviedo, Spain; Clay $15,000+H	Adrien Puget; 7–5, 4–6, 6–2	Albert Alcaraz Ivorra	Oriol Roca Batalla; Jean-Marc Werner	Marc Giner; Raúl Brancaccio; Frederico Ferreira Silva; Gerard Granollers
September 7	Spain F28 Futures; Oviedo, Spain; Clay $15,000+H	Gerard Granollers; Pedro Martínez; 7–5, 6–4	Adrien Puget; Xavier Pujo	Oriol Roca Batalla; Jean-Marc Werner	Marc Giner; Raúl Brancaccio; Frederico Ferreira Silva; Gerard Granollers
September 7	Argentina F11 Futures; Buenos Aires, Argentina; Clay $10,000	Hernán Casanova; 6–4, 2–6, 6–2	Maximiliano Estévez	Federico Coria; Gabriel Alejandro Hidalgo	Carlos Eduardo Severino; Matías Zukas; Sebastián Exequiel Pini; Juan Pablo Paz
September 7	Argentina F11 Futures; Buenos Aires, Argentina; Clay $10,000	Mariano Kestelboim; Alan Kohen; 7–5, 6–4	Sebastián Exequiel Pini; João Pedro Sorgi	Federico Coria; Gabriel Alejandro Hidalgo	Carlos Eduardo Severino; Matías Zukas; Sebastián Exequiel Pini; Juan Pablo Paz
September 7	Belgium F14 Futures; Middelkerke, Belgium; Clay $10,000	Jeremy Jahn; 6–3, 6–4	Joran Vliegen	Alban Meuffels; Gonçalo Oliveira	Stijn Meulemans; Billy Harris; Laurens Verboven; Louis Cant
September 7	Belgium F14 Futures; Middelkerke, Belgium; Clay $10,000	Gonçalo Oliveira; Joran Vliegen; 6–3, 3–6, [10–4]	Timon Reichelt; George von Massow	Alban Meuffels; Gonçalo Oliveira	Stijn Meulemans; Billy Harris; Laurens Verboven; Louis Cant
September 7	Bolivia F1 Futures; Santa Cruz de la Sierra, Bolivia; Clay $10,000	Thales Turini; 7–5, 6–3	Alexandre Tsuchiya	Juan Pablo Varillas; Federico Zeballos	Juan Carlos Aguilar; Jorge Brian Panta; André Miele; Julian Busch
September 7	Bolivia F1 Futures; Santa Cruz de la Sierra, Bolivia; Clay $10,000	André Miele; Alexandre Tsuchiya; 6–0, 6–7^{(4–7)}, [10–2]	Rodrigo Banzer; Federico Zeballos	Juan Pablo Varillas; Federico Zeballos	Juan Carlos Aguilar; Jorge Brian Panta; André Miele; Julian Busch
September 7	Croatia F15 Futures; Bol, Croatia; Clay $10,000	Marcelo Zormann; 6–4, 6–2	Miki Janković	Alexander Ward; Ljubomir Čelebić	Christian Samuelsson; Pascal Meis; Zdeněk Kolář; Franjo Raspudić
September 7	Croatia F15 Futures; Bol, Croatia; Clay $10,000	Tomislav Draganja; Franjo Raspudić; 6–2, 6–0	Francesco Cano; Daniele Giorgini	Alexander Ward; Ljubomir Čelebić	Christian Samuelsson; Pascal Meis; Zdeněk Kolář; Franjo Raspudić
September 7	Egypt F30 Futures; Cairo, Egypt; Clay $10,000	Bastian Trinker; 7–6^{(7–5)}, 6–3	Mohamed Safwat	Karim-Mohamed Maamoun; Vladyslav Manafov	Tak Khunn Wang; Bartosz Wojnar; Nicholas Reyes; Alberto Cammarata
September 7	Egypt F30 Futures; Cairo, Egypt; Clay $10,000	Vladyslav Manafov; Tak Khunn Wang; 6–1, 6–3	Peter Lang; Robin Peham	Karim-Mohamed Maamoun; Vladyslav Manafov	Tak Khunn Wang; Bartosz Wojnar; Nicholas Reyes; Alberto Cammarata
September 7	India F13 Futures; Coimbatore, India; Hard $10,000	Ramkumar Ramanathan; 6–4, 6–2	Ouyang Bowen	Markos Kalovelonis; Vijay Sundar Prashanth	Sidharth Rawat; Ronit Singh Bisht; Vignesh Veerabadran; Mohit Mayur Jayaprakash
September 7	India F13 Futures; Coimbatore, India; Hard $10,000	Gao Xin; Ouyang Bowen; 2–6, 6–3, [10–5]	Mohit Mayur Jayaprakash; Vijay Sundar Prashanth	Markos Kalovelonis; Vijay Sundar Prashanth	Sidharth Rawat; Ronit Singh Bisht; Vignesh Veerabadran; Mohit Mayur Jayaprakash
September 7	Iran F8 Futures; Tehran, Iran; Clay $10,000	Maxime Janvier; 6–1, 6–1	Matteo Marfia	Toni Androić; Ivan Nedelko	François-Arthur Vibert; Shonigmatjon Shofayziyev; Christoffer Solberg; Mohammed Mohazebnia
September 7	Iran F8 Futures; Tehran, Iran; Clay $10,000	Thomas Fancutt; Amirvala Madanchi; 7–6^{(7–4)}, 6–4	Alborz Akhavan; Mohsen Hossein Zade	Toni Androić; Ivan Nedelko	François-Arthur Vibert; Shonigmatjon Shofayziyev; Christoffer Solberg; Mohammed Mohazebnia
September 7	Israel F12 Futures; Meitar, Israel; Hard $10,000	Michael Geerts; 7–6^{(12–10)}, 6–2	Stefano Napolitano	Bar Tzuf Botzer; Peter Kobelt	Ben McLachlan; Guy Michelevitz; Eric James Johnson; Edan Leshem
September 7	Israel F12 Futures; Meitar, Israel; Hard $10,000	Jarryd Chaplin; Ben McLachlan; 7–6^{(7–5)}, 6–3	Michael Geerts; Stefano Napolitano	Bar Tzuf Botzer; Peter Kobelt	Ben McLachlan; Guy Michelevitz; Eric James Johnson; Edan Leshem
September 7	Italy F26 Futures; Pula, Italy; Clay $10,000	Lorenzo Sonego; 7–5, 6–4	Daniel Altmaier	Florian Fallert; Filippo Baldi	Gianluca Di Nicola; Tobias Simon; Alessandro Colella; Riccardo Bonadio
September 7	Italy F26 Futures; Pula, Italy; Clay $10,000	Filippo Baldi; Lorenzo Sonego; 1–6, 6–4, [10–5]	Florian Fallert; Demian Raab	Florian Fallert; Filippo Baldi	Gianluca Di Nicola; Tobias Simon; Alessandro Colella; Riccardo Bonadio
September 7	Korea F7 Futures; Anseong, Korea; Clay (indoor) $10,000	Song Min-kyu; 6–3, 7–6^{(7–3)}	Kim Cheong-eui	Jun Woong-sun; Jeong Young-hoon	Makoto Ochi; Arata Onozawa; Na Jung-woong; Daniel Yoo
September 7	Korea F7 Futures; Anseong, Korea; Clay (indoor) $10,000	Kim Cheong-eui; Noh Sang-woo; 6–1, 6–4	Katsuki Nagao; Hiromasa Oku	Jun Woong-sun; Jeong Young-hoon	Makoto Ochi; Arata Onozawa; Na Jung-woong; Daniel Yoo
September 7	Poland F5 Futures; Ślęza, Poland; Hard $10,000	Hubert Hurkacz; 6–4, 7–6^{(7–4)}	Robin Staněk	Konrad Zieba; Patrik Fabian	Bastian Wagner; Karol Drzewiecki; Luca Pancaldi; Michal Konečný
September 7	Poland F5 Futures; Ślęza, Poland; Hard $10,000	Karol Drzewiecki; Maciej Smoła; 6–2, 6–7^{(3–7)}, [10–5]	Tim Kopinski; Konrad Zieba	Konrad Zieba; Patrik Fabian	Bastian Wagner; Karol Drzewiecki; Luca Pancaldi; Michal Konečný
September 7	Serbia F11 Futures; Zlatibor, Serbia; Clay $10,000	Danilo Petrović; 6–1, 6–2	Nico Matic	Elmar Ejupovic; Vasile Antonescu	André Biró; Dejan Katić; Shunsuke Wakita; Nino Serdarušić
September 7	Serbia F11 Futures; Zlatibor, Serbia; Clay $10,000	Danilo Petrović; Nino Serdarušić; 6–3, 6–7^{(3–7)}, [12–10]	Luka Ilić; Darko Jandrić	Elmar Ejupovic; Vasile Antonescu	André Biró; Dejan Katić; Shunsuke Wakita; Nino Serdarušić
September 7	Tunisia F22 Futures; Port El Kantaoui, Tunisia; Hard $10,000	Rémi Boutillier; 6–2, 6–4	Francesco Vilardo	Ugo Nastasi; Dmytro Badanov	Aziz Dougaz; Christoph Negritu; Yan Sabanin; Alexander Igoshin
September 7	Tunisia F22 Futures; Port El Kantaoui, Tunisia; Hard $10,000	Anis Ghorbel; Vasko Mladenov; 2–6, 7–5, [12–10]	Romain Bauvy; Ugo Nastasi	Ugo Nastasi; Dmytro Badanov	Aziz Dougaz; Christoph Negritu; Yan Sabanin; Alexander Igoshin
September 7	Turkey F36 Futures; Antalya, Turkey; Hard $10,000	Matija Pecotić; 6–7^{(6–8)}, 7–6^{(7–4)}, 6–2	Matteo Berrettini	Jorge Montero; Hiroyasu Ehara	Barkın Yalçınkale; Quentin Robert; Baptiste Crepatte; Jaume Pla Malfeito
September 7	Turkey F36 Futures; Antalya, Turkey; Hard $10,000	Alexander Boborykin; Timur Kiuamov; 6–7^{(2–7)}, 6–4, [10–7]	Gustavo Guerses; Jorge Montero	Jorge Montero; Hiroyasu Ehara	Barkın Yalçınkale; Quentin Robert; Baptiste Crepatte; Jaume Pla Malfeito
September 14	Canada F10 Futures; Toronto, Canada; Clay $15,000	Frank Dancevic; 6–3, 6–2	Sanam Singh	Kaichi Uchida; Filip Peliwo	Noah Rubin; Gianluigi Quinzi; Tigre Hank; Justin S. Shane
September 14	Canada F10 Futures; Toronto, Canada; Clay $15,000	Marko Tepavac; Kaichi Uchida; 2–6, 6–4, [10–8]	Nathan Pasha; Raymond Sarmiento	Kaichi Uchida; Filip Peliwo	Noah Rubin; Gianluigi Quinzi; Tigre Hank; Justin S. Shane
September 14	France F18 Futures; Mulhouse, France; Hard (indoor) $15,000+H	Grégoire Barrère; 6–3, 6–2	David Guez	Sandro Ehrat; Yannick Hanfmann	Joffrey de Schepper; Yann Marti; Medy Chettar; Hugo Daubias
September 14	France F18 Futures; Mulhouse, France; Hard (indoor) $15,000+H	Sander Arends; Adam Majchrowicz; Walkover	Moritz Baumann; Yannick Hanfmann	Sandro Ehrat; Yannick Hanfmann	Joffrey de Schepper; Yann Marti; Medy Chettar; Hugo Daubias
September 14	Argentina F12 Futures; Santa Fe, Argentina; Clay $10,000	Matías Zukas; 3–6, 6–1, 6–3	João Pedro Sorgi	Sebastián Exequiel Pini; Gabriel Alejandro Hidalgo	Gonzalo Villanueva; Santiago Rodríguez Taverna; Franco Emanuel Egea; Hernán Casanova
September 14	Argentina F12 Futures; Santa Fe, Argentina; Clay $10,000	Maximiliano Estévez; Gabriel Alejandro Hidalgo; 6–3, 6–4	Mariano Kestelboim; Matías Zukas	Sebastián Exequiel Pini; Gabriel Alejandro Hidalgo	Gonzalo Villanueva; Santiago Rodríguez Taverna; Franco Emanuel Egea; Hernán Casanova
September 14	Bolivia F2 Futures; La Paz, Bolivia; Clay $10,000	Mauricio Echazú; 6–0, 6–4	Alejandro Mendoza	Stephan Koenigsfest; Rodrigo Banzer	Christopher Díaz Figueroa; Carlos Ramirez Utermann; Filipe Brandao; Federico Zeballos
September 14	Bolivia F2 Futures; La Paz, Bolivia; Clay $10,000	Christopher Díaz Figueroa; Franco Feitt; 2–6, 6–4, [10–8]	Mauricio Echazú; Jorge Brian Panta	Stephan Koenigsfest; Rodrigo Banzer	Christopher Díaz Figueroa; Carlos Ramirez Utermann; Filipe Brandao; Federico Zeballos
September 14	Croatia F16 Futures; Bol, Croatia; Clay $10,000	Miki Janković; 6–3, 6–4	Tomislav Ternar	Simone Roncalli; Pascal Meis	Zdeněk Kolář; Cristóbal Saavedra; George von Massow; Matthias Wunner
September 14	Croatia F16 Futures; Bol, Croatia; Clay $10,000	George von Massow; Matthias Wunner; 6–3, 6–4	Adrian Obert; Cristóbal Saavedra	Simone Roncalli; Pascal Meis	Zdeněk Kolář; Cristóbal Saavedra; George von Massow; Matthias Wunner
September 14	Egypt F31 Futures; Cairo, Egypt; Clay $10,000	Mohamed Safwat; 7–6^{(7–3)}, 6–0	Bastian Trinker	Karim-Mohamed Maamoun; Adrien Puget	Sherif Sabry; Samuel Ribeiro Navarrete; Alberto Cammarata; Tak Khunn Wang
September 14	Egypt F31 Futures; Cairo, Egypt; Clay $10,000	Adrien Puget; Tak Khunn Wang; 7–6^{(13–11)}, 7–6^{(7–2)}	Karim-Mohamed Maamoun; Issam Haitham Taweel	Karim-Mohamed Maamoun; Adrien Puget	Sherif Sabry; Samuel Ribeiro Navarrete; Alberto Cammarata; Tak Khunn Wang
September 14	India F14 Futures; Chennai, India; Hard $10,000	Vijay Sundar Prashanth; 3–6, 6–4, 6–2	Sidharth Rawat	Sumit Nagal; Ouyang Bowen	Prajnesh Gunneswaran; Sasikumar Mukund; Ranjeet Virali-Murugesan; Isa Mammetgulyyev
September 14	India F14 Futures; Chennai, India; Hard $10,000	Gao Xin; Ouyang Bowen; 6–3, 5–7, [11–9]	Kunal Anand; Markos Kalovelonis	Sumit Nagal; Ouyang Bowen	Prajnesh Gunneswaran; Sasikumar Mukund; Ranjeet Virali-Murugesan; Isa Mammetgulyyev
September 14	Iran F9 Futures; Tehran, Iran; Clay $10,000	Ivan Nedelko; 6–3, 6–2	Leon Schutt	Shahin Khaledan; Amirvala Madanchi	Fabio Mercuri; François-Arthur Vibert; Mauricio Pérez Mota; Gabriel Petit
September 14	Iran F9 Futures; Tehran, Iran; Clay $10,000	Gabriel Petit; François-Arthur Vibert; 6–3, 6–1	Thomas Fancutt; Amirvala Madanchi	Shahin Khaledan; Amirvala Madanchi	Fabio Mercuri; François-Arthur Vibert; Mauricio Pérez Mota; Gabriel Petit
September 14	Italy F27 Futures; Pula, Italy; Clay $10,000	Gianluca Mager; 7–6^{(8–6)}, 2–6, 6–3	Yannick Maden	Lorenzo Sonego; Antonio Campo	Filippo Leonardi; Riccardo Bonadio; Andrea Basso; Tobias Simon
September 14	Italy F27 Futures; Pula, Italy; Clay $10,000	Andrea Basso; Francesco Moncagatto; 6–4, 6–7^{(8–10)}, [10–7]	Julian Ocleppo; Lorenzo Sonego	Lorenzo Sonego; Antonio Campo	Filippo Leonardi; Riccardo Bonadio; Andrea Basso; Tobias Simon
September 14	Serbia F12 Futures; Niš, Serbia; Clay $10,000	Danilo Petrović; 6–3, 7–6^{(7–3)}	Scott Griekspoor	Vasile Antonescu; Luka Ilić	Petar Čonkić; Pirmin Hänle; Dejan Katić; Plamen Milushev
September 14	Serbia F12 Futures; Niš, Serbia; Clay $10,000	Danilo Petrović; Nino Serdarušić; 6–1, 6–2	Florent Diep; Pirmin Hänle	Vasile Antonescu; Luka Ilić	Petar Čonkić; Pirmin Hänle; Dejan Katić; Plamen Milushev
September 14	Spain F29 Futures; Madrid, Spain; Hard $10,000	Andrés Artuñedo; 6–0, 2–0 retired	Jaime Pulgar-García	Jaume Pla Malfeito; Ricardo Villacorta-Alonso	Abdullah Maqdes; Carlos Boluda-Purkiss; Maxime Tabatruong; Luca Pancaldi
September 14	Spain F29 Futures; Madrid, Spain; Hard $10,000	Iván Arenas-Gualda; Jaume Pla Malfeito; 6–1, 4–6, [10–8]	Jorge Hernando-Ruano; Ricardo Villacorta-Alonso	Jaume Pla Malfeito; Ricardo Villacorta-Alonso	Abdullah Maqdes; Carlos Boluda-Purkiss; Maxime Tabatruong; Luca Pancaldi
September 14	Tunisia F23 Futures; Port El Kantaoui, Tunisia; Hard $10,000	Patrik Fabian; 6–3, 6–3	Antoine Bellier	Francesco Vilardo; Christoph Negritu	Florian Simbozel; Hugo Voljacques; Antoine Hoang; Juraj Masar
September 14	Tunisia F23 Futures; Port El Kantaoui, Tunisia; Hard $10,000	Jannis Kahlke; Hugo Voljacques; 6–3, 6–6 retired	Antoine Bellier; Aaron Cortes Alcaraz	Francesco Vilardo; Christoph Negritu	Florian Simbozel; Hugo Voljacques; Antoine Hoang; Juraj Masar
September 14	Turkey F37 Futures; Antalya, Turkey; Hard $10,000	Tom Jomby; 6–3, 6–2	Alexander Boborykin	Miliaan Niesten; Peter Heller	Richard Gabb; Daniel Dutra da Silva; Baptiste Crepatte; Zheng Weiqiang
September 14	Turkey F37 Futures; Antalya, Turkey; Hard $10,000	Tom Jomby; Mick Lescure; 6–3, 6–3	Romain Barbosa; Peter Heller	Miliaan Niesten; Peter Heller	Richard Gabb; Daniel Dutra da Silva; Baptiste Crepatte; Zheng Weiqiang
September 14	United States F26 Futures; Claremont, United States; Hard $10,000	Deiton Baughman; 2–6, 6–3, 6–3	Mackenzie McDonald	Collin Altamirano; Sebastian Fanselow	Daniel Garza; Tom Fawcett; Ernesto Escobedo; Gonzales Austin
September 14	United States F26 Futures; Claremont, United States; Hard $10,000	Jean-Yves Aubone; Gonzales Austin; 7–5, 3–6, [10–6]	Hunter Nicholas; Junior Alexander Ore	Collin Altamirano; Sebastian Fanselow	Daniel Garza; Tom Fawcett; Ernesto Escobedo; Gonzales Austin
September 21	Canada F11 Futures; Markham, Canada; Clay $15,000	Sanam Singh; 6–4, 6–2	Frank Dancevic	Noah Rubin; Jared Hiltzik	Kaichi Uchida; Marko Tepavac; Winston Lin; Alejandro Tabilo
September 21	Canada F11 Futures; Markham, Canada; Clay $15,000	Nathan Pasha; Raymond Sarmiento; 7–6^{(7–4)}, 6–2	Marko Tepavac; Kaichi Uchida	Noah Rubin; Jared Hiltzik	Kaichi Uchida; Marko Tepavac; Winston Lin; Alejandro Tabilo
September 21	Egypt F32 Futures; Cairo, Egypt; Clay $15,000+H	Adrien Puget; 7–6^{(7–1)}, 6–0	Mohamed Safwat	Youssef Hossam; Bastian Trinker	Sherif Sabry; Alexandre Müller; Alberto Cammarata; Luca Margaroli
September 21	Egypt F32 Futures; Cairo, Egypt; Clay $15,000+H	Karim-Mohamed Maamoun; Mohamed Safwat; 6–4, 7–5	Luca Margaroli; Adrien Puget	Youssef Hossam; Bastian Trinker	Sherif Sabry; Alexandre Müller; Alberto Cammarata; Luca Margaroli
September 21	France F19 Futures; Plaisir, France; Hard (indoor) $15,000	Maxime Authom; 6–3, 6–4	Jeremy Jahn	Jan Choinski; David Guez	Alexis Gauthier; Pablo Vivero González; Yann Marti; Mats Moraing
September 21	France F19 Futures; Plaisir, France; Hard (indoor) $15,000	Sander Arends; Adam Majchrowicz; 6–4, 6–4	Evan King; Anderson Reed	Jan Choinski; David Guez	Alexis Gauthier; Pablo Vivero González; Yann Marti; Mats Moraing
September 21	Spain F30 Futures; Sevilla, Spain; Clay $15,000	Arthur De Greef; 7–6^{(7–4)}, 7–6^{(7–5)}	Rafael Camilo	Lamine Ouahab; Bernabé Zapata Miralles	Eduard Esteve Lobato; Javier Martí; Marco Bortolotti; Gerard Granollers
September 21	Spain F30 Futures; Sevilla, Spain; Clay $15,000	Marco Bortolotti; Juan Lizariturry; 6–3, 6–4	Lloyd Glasspool; Joshua Ward-Hibbert	Lamine Ouahab; Bernabé Zapata Miralles	Eduard Esteve Lobato; Javier Martí; Marco Bortolotti; Gerard Granollers
September 21	Sweden F4 Futures; Falun, Sweden; Hard (indoor) $15,000	Markus Eriksson; 6–4, 3–6, 6–3	Adrian Sikora	James Marsalek; Mikael Ymer	Edward Corrie; Stefano Napolitano; Omar Salman; Michael Grant
September 21	Sweden F4 Futures; Falun, Sweden; Hard (indoor) $15,000	David O'Hare; Joe Salisbury; 6–3, 7–5	James Marsalek; Marcus Willis	James Marsalek; Mikael Ymer	Edward Corrie; Stefano Napolitano; Omar Salman; Michael Grant
September 21	Argentina F13 Futures; La Rioja, Argentina; Clay $10,000	Maximiliano Estévez; 6–1, 7–6^{(7–1)}	Juan Pablo Paz	Gonzalo Villanueva; Gabriel Alejandro Hidalgo	Hernán Casanova; Nicolás Alberto Arreche; Mariano Kestelboim; Matías Zukas
September 21	Argentina F13 Futures; La Rioja, Argentina; Clay $10,000	Hernán Casanova; Eduardo Agustín Torre; 6–3, 4–6, [10–8]	Nicolás Alberto Arreche; Gabriel Alejandro Hidalgo	Gonzalo Villanueva; Gabriel Alejandro Hidalgo	Hernán Casanova; Nicolás Alberto Arreche; Mariano Kestelboim; Matías Zukas
September 21	Bolivia F3 Futures; Cochabamba, Bolivia; Clay $10,000	Manuel Sánchez; 7–5, 6–3	Federico Zeballos	Felipe Mantilla; Ryusei Makiguchi	Christopher Díaz Figueroa; Mauricio Echazú; André Miele; Luis Diego Chávez Villalpando
September 21	Bolivia F3 Futures; Cochabamba, Bolivia; Clay $10,000	Manuel Sánchez; Federico Zeballos; 6–3, 6–2	Mauricio Echazú; Jorge Brian Panta	Felipe Mantilla; Ryusei Makiguchi	Christopher Díaz Figueroa; Mauricio Echazú; André Miele; Luis Diego Chávez Villalpando
September 21	Croatia F17 Futures; Bol, Croatia; Clay $10,000	Tomás Lipovšek Puches; 6–3, Retired	Miki Janković	Tomislav Ternar; Nerman Fatić	Nik Razboršek; Mike Urbanija; Pascal Meis; Matthias Wunner
September 21	Croatia F17 Futures; Bol, Croatia; Clay $10,000	Tomislav Draganja; Franjo Raspudić; 0–6, 6–3, [10–6]	Sebastian Prechtel; Daniel Uhlig	Tomislav Ternar; Nerman Fatić	Nik Razboršek; Mike Urbanija; Pascal Meis; Matthias Wunner
September 21	India F15 Futures; Madurai, India; Hard $10,000	Sumit Nagal; 7–6^{(7–5)}, 7–6^{(7–4)}	Vishnu Vardhan	Vijay Sundar Prashanth; Sasikumar Mukund	Ronit Singh Bisht; Mohit Mayur Jayaprakash; Ranjeet Virali-Murugesan; Jayesh Pungliya
September 21	India F15 Futures; Madurai, India; Hard $10,000	Sumit Nagal; Vijay Sundar Prashanth; 6–3, 7–5	Anirudh Chandrasekar; Vignesh Peranamallur	Vijay Sundar Prashanth; Sasikumar Mukund	Ronit Singh Bisht; Mohit Mayur Jayaprakash; Ranjeet Virali-Murugesan; Jayesh Pungliya
September 21	Italy F28 Futures; Pula, Italy; Clay $10,000	Stefano Travaglia; 7–5, 6–2	Filippo Leonardi	Viktor Galović; Francesco Picco	Lorenzo Sonego; Gianluca Di Nicola; Matteo Trevisan; Manuel Mazzella
September 21	Italy F28 Futures; Pula, Italy; Clay $10,000	Matteo Fago; Manuel Mazzella; 4–6, 6–1, [13–11]	Cristian Carli; Gianluca Di Nicola	Viktor Galović; Francesco Picco	Lorenzo Sonego; Gianluca Di Nicola; Matteo Trevisan; Manuel Mazzella
September 21	Serbia F13 Futures; Sokobanja, Serbia; Clay $10,000	Danilo Petrović; 2–6, 7–6^{(8–6)}, 7–6^{(7–4)}	Scott Griekspoor	Alexandar Lazov; Nico Matic	Nino Serdarušić; Dejan Katić; Tomislav Jotovski; Jérôme Inzerillo
September 21	Serbia F13 Futures; Sokobanja, Serbia; Clay $10,000	Tomislav Jotovski; Alexandar Lazov; 4–6, 6–4, [10–6]	Bogdan Djurdjevic; Enric Guaita-Pais	Alexandar Lazov; Nico Matic	Nino Serdarušić; Dejan Katić; Tomislav Jotovski; Jérôme Inzerillo
September 21	Tunisia F24 Futures; Port El Kantaoui, Tunisia; Hard $10,000	Nikola Milojević; 6–3, 6–1	Jannis Kahlke	Théo Fournerie; Jaime Pulgar-García	Dmytro Badanov; André Gaspar Murta; Richard Becker; Patrik Fabian
September 21	Tunisia F24 Futures; Port El Kantaoui, Tunisia; Hard $10,000	Antoine Hoang; Louis Tessa; 6–4, 6–1	Anis Ghorbel; Majed Kilani	Théo Fournerie; Jaime Pulgar-García	Dmytro Badanov; André Gaspar Murta; Richard Becker; Patrik Fabian
September 21	Turkey F38 Futures; Antalya, Turkey; Hard $10,000	Edoardo Eremin; 6–2, 7–6^{(10–8)}	Peter Heller	Romain Barbosa; Miliaan Niesten	Liam Broady; Simon Friis Søndergaard; Kirill Dmitriev; Ken Onishi
September 21	Turkey F38 Futures; Antalya, Turkey; Hard $10,000	Robert Galloway; Robbie Mudge; 1–6, 6–4, [10–5]	Kirill Dmitriev; Andrei Plotniy	Romain Barbosa; Miliaan Niesten	Liam Broady; Simon Friis Søndergaard; Kirill Dmitriev; Ken Onishi
September 21	United States F27 Futures; Costa Mesa, United States; Hard $10,000	Ryan Shane; 6–4, 6–3	Ernesto Escobedo	Nicolaas Scholtz; Deiton Baughman	Wil Spencer; Jean-Yves Aubone; Junior Alexander Ore; Collin Altamirano
September 21	United States F27 Futures; Costa Mesa, United States; Hard $10,000	Mackenzie McDonald; Martin Redlicki; 6–2, 3–6, [10–5]	Jean-Yves Aubone; Benjamin Lock	Nicolaas Scholtz; Deiton Baughman	Wil Spencer; Jean-Yves Aubone; Junior Alexander Ore; Collin Altamirano
September 28	Australia F6 Futures; Alice Springs, Australia; Hard $15,000	Robin Staněk; 6–2, 6–3	Li Zhe	Maverick Banes; Dayne Kelly	Yusuke Watanuki; Omar Jasika; Gavin van Peperzeel; Bradley Mousley
September 28	Australia F6 Futures; Alice Springs, Australia; Hard $15,000	Gao Xin; Li Zhe; 3–6, 6–3, [10–1]	Alex Bolt; Jordan Thompson	Maverick Banes; Dayne Kelly	Yusuke Watanuki; Omar Jasika; Gavin van Peperzeel; Bradley Mousley
September 28	Portugal F12 Futures; Oliveira de Azeméis, Portugal; Hard $15,000	Pablo Vivero González; 3–6, 7–5, 6–3	Hubert Hurkacz	Carlos Gómez-Herrera; Ricardo Rodríguez	Matthew Short; Nuno Borges; Francisco Cabral; Jorge Hernando-Ruano
September 28	Portugal F12 Futures; Oliveira de Azeméis, Portugal; Hard $15,000	Nuno Deus; João Domingues; 6–3, 6–4	Carlos Gómez-Herrera; Matthew Short	Carlos Gómez-Herrera; Ricardo Rodríguez	Matthew Short; Nuno Borges; Francisco Cabral; Jorge Hernando-Ruano
September 28	Sweden F5 Futures; Danderyd, Sweden; Hard (indoor) $15,000	Joe Salisbury; 7–6^{(6–3)}, 3–6, 6–3	Mikael Ymer	Fred Simonsson; Isak Arvidsson	Jonathan Mridha; Stefano Napolitano; Casper Ruud; Sam Barry
September 28	Sweden F5 Futures; Danderyd, Sweden; Hard (indoor) $15,000	David O'Hare; Joe Salisbury; 7–5, 6–7^{(5–7)}, [10–5]	Sam Barry; David Rice	Fred Simonsson; Isak Arvidsson	Jonathan Mridha; Stefano Napolitano; Casper Ruud; Sam Barry
September 28	Argentina F14 Futures; San Juan, Argentina; Clay $10,000	Francisco Bahamonde; 6–3, 7–6^{(7–4)}	Juan Pablo Paz	Maximiliano Estévez; Ryusei Makiguchi	Franco Agamenone; Nicolas Alberto Arreche; Gonzalo Villanueva; Sebastian Exequiel Pini
September 28	Argentina F14 Futures; San Juan, Argentina; Clay $10,000	Franco Agamenone; Franco Emanuel Egea; 6–2, 7–5,	Franco Capalbo; Gerónimo Espín Busleiman	Maximiliano Estévez; Ryusei Makiguchi	Franco Agamenone; Nicolas Alberto Arreche; Gonzalo Villanueva; Sebastian Exequiel Pini
September 28	Croatia F18 Futures; Solin, Croatia; Clay $10,000	Václav Šafránek; 7–6^{(7–2)}, 6–2	Dušan Lojda	Stefan Kozlov; Nino Serdarušić	Mate Delić; Zdeněk Kolář; Duje Kekez; Pascal Meis
September 28	Croatia F18 Futures; Solin, Croatia; Clay $10,000	Zdeněk Kolář; Tomáš Toman; 6–4, 2–6, [10–6]	Stefan Kozlov; Nino Serdarušić	Stefan Kozlov; Nino Serdarušić	Mate Delić; Zdeněk Kolář; Duje Kekez; Pascal Meis
September 28	Egypt F33 Futures; Sharm El Sheikh, Egypt; Hard $10,000	Jaroslav Pospíšil; 3–6, 6–1, 6–0	Gleb Sakharov	Mohamed Safwat; Jonas Merckx	Maxime Mora; Jordan Ubiergo; Luca Pancaldi; Scott Clayton
September 28	Egypt F33 Futures; Sharm El Sheikh, Egypt; Hard $10,000	Scott Clayton; Jonny O'Mara; 6–2, 6–4	Mohamed Safwat; Issam Haitham Taweel	Mohamed Safwat; Jonas Merckx	Maxime Mora; Jordan Ubiergo; Luca Pancaldi; Scott Clayton
September 28	France F20 Futures; Forbach, France; Carpet $10,000	Jan Choinski; 6–3, 7–6^{(7–2)}	Ugo Humbert	Mats Moraing; Hugo Grenier	Julien Dubail; Constantin Belot; Lucas Catarina; Gonçalo Oliveira
September 28	France F20 Futures; Forbach, France; Carpet $10,000	Gonçalo Oliveira; Matthieu Roy; 6–7^{(5–7)}, 6–4, [10–6]	Constantin Belot; Thibault Venturino	Mats Moraing; Hugo Grenier	Julien Dubail; Constantin Belot; Lucas Catarina; Gonçalo Oliveira
September 28	Germany F14 Futures; Hambach, Germany; Carpet $10,000	Maximilian Marterer; 6–2, 6–2	Marc Sieber	Oscar Otte; Tom Schönenberg	Christian Hirschmüller; David Poljak; Mārtiņš Podžus; Peter Torebko
September 28	Germany F14 Futures; Hambach, Germany; Carpet $10,000	Johannes Härteis; Hannes Wagner; 7–6^{(7–5)}, 7–6^{(7–4)}	Jānis Podžus; Mārtiņš Podžus	Oscar Otte; Tom Schönenberg	Christian Hirschmüller; David Poljak; Mārtiņš Podžus; Peter Torebko
September 28	Italy F29 Futures; Pula, Italy; Clay $10,000	Arthur De Greef; 6–4, 6–4	Antonio Massara	Federico Bonacia; Gianluca Di Nicola	Walter Trusendi; Luca Giacomini; Francesco Picco; Andrea Basso
September 28	Italy F29 Futures; Pula, Italy; Clay $10,000	Andrea Basso; Francesco Moncagatto; 6–4, 6–4	Marco Bortolotti; Davide Della Tommasina	Federico Bonacia; Gianluca Di Nicola	Walter Trusendi; Luca Giacomini; Francesco Picco; Andrea Basso
September 28	Spain F31 Futures; Sabadell, Spain; Clay $10,000	Marc Giner; 6–3, 1–6, 6–3	Gerard Granollers	Oriol Roca Batalla; Albert Alcaraz Ivorra	Alban Meuffels; Steven Diez; Pol Toledo Bagué; Antal van der Duim
September 28	Spain F31 Futures; Sabadell, Spain; Clay $10,000	Viktor Durasovic; Bernabé Zapata Miralles; 6–4, 6–1	Juan-Samuel Arauzo-Martínez; Jean-Marc Werner	Oriol Roca Batalla; Albert Alcaraz Ivorra	Alban Meuffels; Steven Diez; Pol Toledo Bagué; Antal van der Duim
September 28	Tunisia F25 Futures; Port El Kantaoui, Tunisia; Hard $10,000	Evan Hoyt; 6–3, 1–6, 6–2	Kevin Griekspoor	Antoine Bellier; Francesco Vilardo	Matteo Tinelli; Aziz Dougaz; Anis Ghorbel; Francesco Garzelli
September 28	Tunisia F25 Futures; Port El Kantaoui, Tunisia; Hard $10,000	Anis Ghorbel; Evan Hoyt; 6–2, 6–3	Théo Fournerie; Jonathan Kanar	Antoine Bellier; Francesco Vilardo	Matteo Tinelli; Aziz Dougaz; Anis Ghorbel; Francesco Garzelli
September 28	Turkey F39 Futures; Antalya, Turkey; Hard $10,000	Liam Broady; 7–5, 6–3	Luke Bambridge	Isaac Frost; Alexandre Folie	Barkın Yalçınkale; Mark Whitehouse; Lloyd Harris; Edoardo Eremin
September 28	Turkey F39 Futures; Antalya, Turkey; Hard $10,000	Robert Galloway; Robbie Mudge; 6–4, 3–6, [10–5]	Daniel Dutra da Silva; Eduardo Russi	Isaac Frost; Alexandre Folie	Barkın Yalçınkale; Mark Whitehouse; Lloyd Harris; Edoardo Eremin
September 28	Ukraine F4 Futures; Cherkasy, Ukraine; Clay $10,000	Bastian Malla; 6–0, 6–1	Stijn Meulemans	Ivan Nedelko; Libor Salaba	Dmytro Badanov; Filip Brtnický; Volodymyr Uzhylovskyi; Vladyslav Manafov
September 28	Ukraine F4 Futures; Cherkasy, Ukraine; Clay $10,000	Marat Deviatiarov; Libor Salaba; 6–2, 6–1	Mauricio Pérez Mota; François-Arthur Vibert	Ivan Nedelko; Libor Salaba	Dmytro Badanov; Filip Brtnický; Volodymyr Uzhylovskyi; Vladyslav Manafov
September 28	USA F28 Futures; Laguna Niguel, United States; Hard $10,000	Nicolaas Scholtz; 4–6, 6–4, 6–2	Wil Spencer	Lucas Gómez; Phillip Simmonds	Miomir Kecmanović; Noah Rubin; Clay Thompson; Hendrik Jebens
September 28	USA F28 Futures; Laguna Niguel, United States; Hard $10,000	Brandon Holt; Riley Smith; 6–4, 6–3	Junior Alexander Ore; Wil Spencer	Lucas Gómez; Phillip Simmonds	Miomir Kecmanović; Noah Rubin; Clay Thompson; Hendrik Jebens
