= 2014 ATP Shenzhen Open – Singles =

Singles
- 2014 ATP Shenzhen Open

Final
- Champion: (United Kingdom) Andy Murray
- Runner-up: (Spain) Tommy Robredo
- Score: 5–7, 7–6^{(11–9)}, 6–1

Events
Singles	Doubles
ATP Shenzhen Open	· 2015 →

Andy Murray defeated Tommy Robredo in the final, 5–7, 7–6^{(11–9)}, 6–1 to win the inaugural singles tennis title at the 2014 ATP Shenzhen Open. He saved five championship points en route to the title, in the second set.

== Seeds ==
The top four seeds receive a bye into the second round.

1. (Spain) David Ferrer (second round)
2. (United Kingdom) Andy Murray (champion)
3. (France) Richard Gasquet (quarterfinals)
4. (Spain) Tommy Robredo (final)
5. (France) Gilles Simon (first round)
6. (Colombia) Santiago Giraldo (semifinals)
7. (Canada) Vasek Pospisil (second round)
8. (Italy) Andreas Seppi (quarterfinals)

== Draw ==
=== Key ===
- Q = Qualifier
- WC = Wild card
- LL = Lucky loser
- Alt = Alternate
- SE = Special exempt
- PR = Protected ranking
- ITF = ITF entry
- JE = Junior exempt
- w/o = Walkover
- r = Retired
- d = Defaulted
- SR = Special ranking

=== Finals ===
Semifinals
6	(Colombia) Santiago Giraldo	1	4
4	(Spain) Tommy Robredo	6	6
(Argentina) Juan Mónaco	6	3	0
2/WC	(United Kingdom) Andy Murray	2	6	6

Final
4	(Spain) Tommy Robredo	7	6^{9}	1
2/WC	(United Kingdom) Andy Murray	5	7^{11}	6

=== Top half ===
First round
Q	(Slovakia) M Kližan	7	1	0^{r}
Q	(Serbia) V Troicki	5	6	3
WC	(Belarus) E Gerasimov	6^{3}	1
Q	(Australia) T Kokkinakis	7^{7}	6
Q	(China) B Ouyang	6	3	4
6	(Colombia) S Giraldo	3	6	6
(Australia) S Groth	6	6^{5}	6
(Australia) J Duckworth	3	7^{7}	3
(Australia) M Ebden	4	2
(Italy) S Bolelli	6	6
(Argentina) M González	6^{3}	2
8	(Italy) A Seppi	7^{7}	6

Second round
1	(Spain) D Ferrer	3	4
Q	(Serbia) V Troicki	6	6
Q	(Australia) T Kokkinakis	4	3
6	(Colombia) S Giraldo	6	6
4	(Spain) T Robredo	1	7	6
(Australia) S Groth	6	5	3
(Italy) S Bolelli	4	3
8	(Italy) A Seppi	6	6

Quarterfinals
Q	(Serbia) V Troicki	6^{6}	3
6	(Colombia) S Giraldo	7^{8}	6
4	(Spain) T Robredo	6	6^{5}	6
8	(Italy) A Seppi	4	7^{7}	3

Semifinals
6	(Colombia) S Giraldo	1	4
4	(Spain) T Robredo	6	6

=== Bottom half ===
First round
7	(Canada) V Pospisil	6	6
(Russia) T Gabashvili	3	4
(Argentina) F Delbonis	3	5
(Argentina) J Mónaco	6	7
(Luxembourg) G Müller	6	3	6
(Switzerland) M Chiudinelli	4	6	4
5	(France) G Simon	4	2
(Lithuania) R Berankis	6	6
(Slovakia) L Lacko	6	7^{7}
(Russia) E Donskoy	1	6^{4}
(India) S Devvarman	6	4	6
WC	(China) X Gao	3	6	4

Second round
7	(Canada) V Pospisil	5	6	3
(Argentina) J Mónaco	7	2	6
(Luxembourg) G Müller	3	2
3	(France) R Gasquet	6	6
(Lithuania) R Berankis	4	6^{1}
(Slovakia) L Lacko	6	7^{7}
(India) S Devvarman	3	3
2/WC	(United Kingdom) A Murray	6	6

Quarterfinals
(Argentina) J Mónaco	7^{9}	6
3	(France) R Gasquet	6^{7}	4
(Slovakia) L Lacko	3	5
2/WC	(United Kingdom) A Murray	6	7

Semifinals
(Argentina) J Mónaco	6	3	0
2/WC	(United Kingdom) A Murray	2	6	6

== Qualifying ==
=== Seeds ===
1. (Slovakia) Martin Kližan (qualified)
2. (Switzerland) Marco Chiudinelli (moved to main draw)
3. (Serbia) Viktor Troicki (qualified)
4. (Australia) Thanasi Kokkinakis (qualified)
5. (Chinese Taipei) Yang Tsung-hua (qualifying competition)
6. (New Zealand) Michael Venus (qualifying competition)
7. (Japan) Toshihide Matsui (qualifying competition)
8. (China) Ouyang Bowen (qualified)

=== Qualifiers ===
1. (Slovakia) Martin Kližan
2. (China) Ouyang Bowen
3. (Serbia) Viktor Troicki
4. (Australia) Thanasi Kokkinakis

=== Qualifying draw ===
==== First qualifier ====
First round					Second round				Qualifying competition
					1	(Slovakia) Martin Kližan	6	6
	(United Kingdom) Colin Fleming	6	3	0^{r}	WC	(China) Te Rigele	2	0
WC	(China) Te Rigele	1	6	0					1	(Slovakia) Martin Kližan	7^{7}	6
	(China) Gong Xiao	4	4						5	(Chinese Taipei) Yang Tsung-hua	6^{3}	2
WC	(China) Qiu Zhuoyang	6	6		WC	(China) Qiu Zhuoyang	0	1
					5	(Chinese Taipei) Yang Tsung-hua	6	6

==== Second qualifier ====
Second round
2	(Switzerland) Marco Chiudinelli
(China) Liu Siyu	w/o
(China) He Yecong	3	4
8/WC	(China) Ouyang Bowen	6	6

Qualifying competition
(China) Liu Siyu	4	6^{3}
8/WC	(China) Ouyang Bowen	6	7^{7}

==== Third qualifier ====
First round				Second round				Qualifying competition
				3	(Serbia) Viktor Troicki	7^{7}	7^{7}
WC	(China) Zhu Zhicheng	3	4		(Sweden) Johan Brunström	6^{2}	6^{5}
	(Sweden) Johan Brunström	6	6					3	(Serbia) Viktor Troicki	6	7^{10}
WC	(China) Wang Aoran	6	6					7	(Japan) Toshihide Matsui	2	6^{8}
	(China) Li Zhaotai	4	2	WC	(China) Wang Aoran	3	2
				7	(Japan) Toshihide Matsui	6	6

==== Fourth qualifier ====
Second round
4	(Australia) Thanasi Kokkinakis	6	6
WC	(China) Zhu Jiacheng	2	0
WC	(China) Zhang Zhuo	1	3
6	(New Zealand) Michael Venus	6	6

Qualifying competition
4	(Australia) Thanasi Kokkinakis	6	7
6	(New Zealand) Michael Venus	2	5
