= 2014 Shenzhen Open =

2014 Shenzhen Open may refer to:

- 2014 ATP Shenzhen Open, an ATP World Tour tennis tournament.
- 2014 WTA Shenzhen Open, a WTA Tour tennis tournament.
