= 2014 ATP Shenzhen Open =

- Date: September 22–28
- Edition: 1st
- Category: World Tour 250 series
- Draw: 32S/16D
- Surface: Hard
- Location: Shenzhen, China
- Venue: Longgang Tennis Centre

Champions

Singles
- (United Kingdom) Andy Murray

Doubles
- (Netherlands) Jean-Julien Rojer / (Romania) Horia Tecău
ATP Shenzhen Open	· 2015 →

The 2014 ATP Shenzhen Open was a professional men's tennis tournament played on hard courts. This was the inaugural edition of the tournament, which was part of the ATP World Tour 250 series of the 2014 ATP World Tour. It took place at the Shenzhen Longgang Tennis Centre in Shenzhen, China from September 22 to September 28.

== Singles main draw entrants ==
=== Seeds ===
Country	Player	Rank^{1}	Seed
ESP	David Ferrer	5	1
GBR	Andy Murray	12	2
FRA	Richard Gasquet	21	3
ESP	Tommy Robredo	22	4
FRA	Gilles Simon	26	5
COL	Santiago Giraldo	33	6
CAN	Vasek Pospisil	43	7
ITA	Andreas Seppi	48	8

- ^{1} Rankings are as of September 15, 2014

=== Other entrants ===
The following players received wildcards into the singles main draw:

- (China) Gao Xin
- (Belarus) Egor Gerasimov
- (United Kingdom) Andy Murray

The following players received entry from the qualifying draw:

- (Slovakia) Martin Kližan
- (Australia) Thanasi Kokkinakis
- (China) Ouyang Bowen
- (Serbia) Viktor Troicki

=== Withdrawals ===
Before the tournament

- (Spain) Roberto Bautista Agut
- (Spain) Guillermo García-López
- (Germany) Tobias Kamke
- (Slovenia) Blaž Kavčič
- (United States) Donald Young
- (Russia) Mikhail Youzhny

=== Retirements ===
- (Slovakia) Martin Kližan (wrist pain)

== Doubles main draw entrants ==
=== Seeds ===
Country	Player	Country	Player	Rank^{1}	Seed
NED	Jean-Julien Rojer	ROU	Horia Tecău	38	1
COL	Juan Sebastián Cabal	COL	Robert Farah	49	2
IND	Rohan Bopanna	PAK	Aisam-ul-Haq Qureshi	55	3
POL	Mariusz Fyrstenberg	BLR	Max Mirnyi	76	4

- ^{1} Rankings are as of September 15, 2014

=== Other entrants ===
The following pairs received wildcards into the doubles main draw:

- (China) Ouyang Bowen / (China) Wang Aoran
- (China) Qiu Zhuoyang / (China) Te Rigele

The following pair received entry as alternates:

- (Switzerland) Marco Chiudinelli / (Slovakia) Lukáš Lacko

=== Withdrawals ===
Before the tournament

- (France) Richard Gasquet (right elbow injury)

== Champions ==
=== Singles ===
- (United Kingdom) Andy Murray defeated (Spain) Tommy Robredo, 5–7, 7–6^{(11–9)}, 6–1

=== Doubles ===
- (Netherlands) Jean-Julien Rojer / (Romania) Horia Tecău defeated (Australia) Sam Groth / (Australia) Chris Guccione, 6–4, 7–6^{(7–4)}
