= Qiu Zhuoyang =

Chinese tennis player (born 1996)

- Country (sports): China
- Born: 23 June 1996 (age 29) Nantong, China
- Height: 1.85 m (6 ft 1 in)
- Plays: Right-handed (two handed-backhand)
- Prize money: $20,457

Singles
- Career record: 0–0 (at ATP Tour level, Grand Slam level, and in Davis Cup)
- Career titles: 0
- Highest ranking: No. 1,293 (17 April 2017)

Doubles
- Career record: 0–1 (at ATP Tour level, Grand Slam level, and in Davis Cup)
- Career titles: 0 ITF
- Highest ranking: No. 767 (29 August 2016)

Qiu Zhuoyang (born 23 June 1996) is a Chinese tennis player.

Qiu has a career high ATP singles ranking of No. 1,293 achieved on 17 April 2017 and a career high ATP doubles ranking of No. 767 achieved on 29 August 2016.

Qiu made his ATP main draw debut at the 2014 ATP Shenzhen Open, in the doubles draw partnering Te Rigele.
