= Ouyang Bowen =

Chinese tennis player

Ouyang Bowen 欧阳博文
- Full name: Ouyang Bowen
- Country (sports): Hong Kong (2007–2009); China (2009–present)
- Residence: Tianjin, China
- Born: 19 May 1992 (age 34) Xinjing, China
- Retired: 2016 (last match played)
- Plays: Left-handed (two handed-backhand)
- Prize money: $66,319

Singles
- Career record: 0–1 (at ATP Tour level, Grand Slam level, and in Davis Cup)
- Career titles: 0
- Highest ranking: No. 611 (11 July 2016)

Doubles
- Career record: 0–1 (at ATP Tour level, Grand Slam level, and in Davis Cup)
- Career titles: 1 ITF
- Highest ranking: No. 461 (8 August 2016)
- Last updated on: 3 October 2016.

Ouyang Bowen (Chinese: 欧阳博文; pinyin: Ōuyáng Bówén; born 19 May 1992 in Xinjing) is a Chinese former tennis player.

== Career ==
Ouyang won in the qualifications to reach the main draw but lost in the first round at the 2014 ATP Shenzhen Open.
