= 2018 Shenzhen Open – Singles =

2018 Shenzhen Open – Singles may refer to:

- 2018 ATP Shenzhen Open – Singles
- 2018 WTA Shenzhen Open – Singles

== See also ==
- 2018 Shenzhen Open (disambiguation)
