= 2017 ATP Shenzhen Open =

- Date: September 25–October 1
- Edition: 4th
- Category: World Tour 250 series
- Draw: 28S/16D
- Surface: Hard
- Location: Shenzhen, China

Champions

Singles
- (Belgium) David Goffin

Doubles
- (Austria) Alexander Peya / (United States) Rajeev Ram
← 2016 ·	ATP Shenzhen Open	· 2018 →

The 2017 ATP Shenzhen Open was a professional men's tennis tournament played on hard courts. It was the 4th edition of the tournament, and part of the ATP World Tour 250 series of the 2017 ATP World Tour. It took place at the Shenzhen Longgang Tennis Centre in Shenzhen, China from September 25 to October 1.

Dudi Sela, Israel's # 1 player quit his quarterfinal match in the third set of the 2017 Shenzhen Open so he could begin observing Yom Kippur—the holiest day of the Jewish year—by the time the sun set, forfeiting a possible $34,000 in prize money and 90 rankings points. He had asked the tournament organizers to have his match be moved forward to be completed before sunset to accommodate his religion, but they denied his request.

== Singles main draw entrants ==
=== Seeds ===
Country	Player	Rank^{1}	Seed
GER	Alexander Zverev	4	1
BEL	David Goffin	12	2
GER	Mischa Zverev	27	3
ITA	Paolo Lorenzi	38	4
UKR	Alexandr Dolgopolov	52	5
BIH	Damir Džumhur	55	6
POR	João Sousa	57	7
USA	Donald Young	60	8

- ^{1} Rankings are as of September 18, 2017

=== Other entrants ===
- (Spain) Nicola Kuhn
- (Australia) Akira Santillan
- (China) Zhang Ze

The following players received entry from the qualifying draw:

- (Australia) Matthew Ebden
- (South Africa) Lloyd Harris
- (Slovakia) Lukáš Lacko
- (China) Zhang Zhizhen

=== Withdrawals ===
Before the tournament

- (Brazil) Thomaz Bellucci →replaced by (Argentina) Nicolás Kicker
- (Czech Republic) Tomáš Berdych →replaced by (Switzerland) Henri Laaksonen
- (South Korea) Chung Hyeon →replaced by (Spain) Marcel Granollers
- (Germany) Philipp Kohlschreiber →replaced by (Romania) Marius Copil
- (Serbia) Janko Tipsarević →replaced by (Italy) Alessandro Giannessi

=== Retirements ===
- (Israel) Dudi Sela

== Doubles main draw entrants ==
=== Seeds ===
Country	Player	Country	Player	Rank^{1}	Seed
CRO	Nikola Mektić	USA	Nicholas Monroe	64	1
AUT	Alexander Peya	USA	Rajeev Ram	88	2
BRA	Marcelo Melo	GER	Alexander Zverev	105	3
NED	Wesley Koolhof	NZL	Artem Sitak	108	4

- ^{1} Rankings are as of September 18, 2017

=== Other entrants ===
The following pairs received wildcards into the doubles main draw:

- (China) Bai Yan / (China) Zhang Zhizhen
- (China) Gong Maoxin / (China) Zhang Ze

=== Withdrawals ===
During the tournament

- (Germany) Alexander Zverev

== Champions ==
=== Singles ===
- (Belgium) David Goffin def. (Ukraine) Alexandr Dolgopolov, 6–4, 6–7^{(5–7)}, 6–3

=== Doubles ===
- (Austria) Alexander Peya / (United States) Rajeev Ram def. (Croatia) Nikola Mektić / (United States) Nicholas Monroe, 6–3, 6–2
