= 2017 ATP Shenzhen Open – Singles =

Singles
- 2017 ATP Shenzhen Open

Final
- Champion: (Belgium) David Goffin
- Runner-up: (Ukraine) Alexandr Dolgopolov
- Score: 6–4, 6–7^{(5–7)}, 6–3

Details
- Draw: 28 (4 Q / 3 WC )
- Seeds: 8

Events
Singles	Doubles
← 2016 ·	ATP Shenzhen Open	· 2018 →

Tomáš Berdych was the two-time defending champion, but withdrew before the competition began.

David Goffin won the title, defeating Alexandr Dolgopolov in the final, 6–4, 6–7^{(5–7)}, 6–3.

== Seeds ==
The top four seeds receive a bye into the second round.

1. (Germany) Alexander Zverev (quarterfinals)
2. (Belgium) David Goffin (champion)
3. (Germany) Mischa Zverev (second round)
4. (Italy) Paolo Lorenzi (second round)
5. (Ukraine) Alexandr Dolgopolov (final)
6. (Bosnia and Herzegovina) Damir Džumhur (semifinals)
7. (Portugal) João Sousa (first round)
8. (United States) Donald Young (quarterfinals)

== Draw ==
=== Key ===
- Q = Qualifier
- WC = Wild card
- LL = Lucky loser
- Alt = Alternate
- ITF = ITF entry
- PR = Protected ranking
- SR = Special ranking
- SE = Special exempt
- JE = Junior exempt
- JR = Junior Accelerator Programme entrant
- CO = College Accelerator Programme entrant
- NG = Next Gen Accelerator Program entrant
- w/o = Walkover
- r = Retired
- d = Defaulted

=== Finals ===
Semifinals
6	(Bosnia and Herzegovina) Damir Džumhur	3	4
5	(Ukraine) Alexandr Dolgopolov	6	6
(Switzerland) Henri Laaksonen	6^{7}	7	3
2	(Belgium) David Goffin	7^{9}	5	6

Finals
5	(Ukraine) Alexandr Dolgopolov	4	7^{7}	3
2	(Belgium) David Goffin	6	6^{5}	6

=== Top half ===
First round
(Belgium) S Darcis	7	7^{7}
WC	(China) Ze Zhang	5	6^{3}
Q	(Slovakia) L Lacko	6	6
(Spain) M Granollers	3	4
PR	(Australia) J Millman	4	5
6	(Bosnia and Herzegovina) D Džumhur	6	7
(Israel) D Sela	6	7^{10}
Q	(Australia) M Ebden	0	6^{8}
(Argentina) N Kicker	3	3
(Ukraine) S Stakhovsky	6	6
Q	(South Africa) L Harris	3	4
5	(Ukraine) A Dolgopolov	6	6

Second round
1	(Germany) A Zverev	4	7^{7}	7^{7}
(Belgium) S Darcis	6	6^{5}	6^{5}
Q	(Slovakia) L Lacko	4	3
6	(Bosnia and Herzegovina) D Džumhur	6	6
3	(Germany) M Zverev	3	7	2
(Israel) D Sela	6	5	6
(Ukraine) S Stakhovsky	6^{5}	4
5	(Ukraine) A Dolgopolov	7^{7}	6

Quarterfinals
1	(Germany) A Zverev	4	5
6	(Bosnia and Herzegovina) D Džumhur	6	7
(Israel) D Sela	3	6	0^{r}
5	(Ukraine) A Dolgopolov	6	4	1

Semifinals
6	(Bosnia and Herzegovina) D Džumhur	3	4
5	(Ukraine) A Dolgopolov	6	6

=== Bottom half ===
First round
7	(Portugal) J Sousa	3	0
(Switzerland) H Laaksonen	6	6
(Tunisia) M Jaziri	4	6	3
(Romania) M Copil	6	3	6
(Brazil) R Dutra Silva	4	1
Q	(China) Zh Zhang	6	6
8	(United States) D Young	7	7^{7}
WC	(Spain) N Kuhn	5	6^{4}
(Italy) A Giannessi	6^{6}	4
(France) J Chardy	7^{8}	6
WC	(Australia) A Santillan	6	2	6^{5}
(Russia) E Donskoy	3	6	7^{7}

Second round
(Switzerland) H Laaksonen	4	6	6
(Romania) M Copil	6	4	3
Q	(China) Zh Zhang	4	6	7^{7}
4	(Italy) P Lorenzi	6	3	6^{4}
8	(United States) D Young	7^{7}	6
(France) J Chardy	6^{5}	4
(Russia) E Donskoy	6^{5}	3
2	(Belgium) D Goffin	7^{7}	6

Quarterfinals
(Switzerland) H Laaksonen	6	3	6
Q	(China) Zh Zhang	4	6	2
8	(United States) D Young	2	3
2	(Belgium) D Goffin	6	6

Semifinals
(Switzerland) H Laaksonen	6^{7}	7	3
2	(Belgium) D Goffin	7^{9}	5	6

== Qualifying ==
=== Seeds ===
1. (Moldova) Radu Albot (first round, retired)
2. (Brazil) Thiago Monteiro (withdrew, moved to Chengdu main draw)
3. (Chile) Nicolás Jarry (qualifying competition)
4. (Slovakia) Lukáš Lacko (qualified)
5. (Germany) Yannick Hanfmann (first round)
6. (Australia) Matthew Ebden (qualified)
7. (United States) Reilly Opelka (first round)
8. (Czech Republic) Lukáš Rosol (first round)

=== Qualifiers ===
1. (Australia) Matthew Ebden
2. (China) Zhang Zhizhen
3. (South Africa) Lloyd Harris
4. (Slovakia) Lukáš Lacko

=== Qualifying draw ===
==== First qualifier ====
First round
1	(Moldova) Radu Albot	4	0^{r}
(Australia) Max Purcell	6	4
(Croatia) Franko Škugor	3	4
6	(Australia) Matthew Ebden	6	6

Qualifying competition
(Australia) Max Purcell	1	7^{8}	1
6	(Australia) Matthew Ebden	6	6^{6}	6

==== Second qualifier ====
First round
Alt	(China) Bai Yan	4	3
WC	(China) Zhang Zhizhen	6	6
(Japan) Hiroki Moriya	6	6
5	(Germany) Yannick Hanfmann	2	3

Qualifying competition
WC	(China) Zhang Zhizhen	7^{7}	6
(Japan) Hiroki Moriya	6^{5}	3

==== Third qualifier ====
First round
3	(Chile) Nicolás Jarry	6	7
WC	(Brazil) André Sá	2	5
(South Africa) Lloyd Harris	6	4	6
7	(United States) Reilly Opelka	4	6	4

Qualifying competition
3	(Chile) Nicolás Jarry	6	4	4
(South Africa) Lloyd Harris	4	6	6

==== Fourth qualifier ====
First round
4	(Slovakia) Lukáš Lacko	6	6
(Japan) Yusuke Takahashi	3	4
(Australia) Marc Polmans	6	6
8	(Czech Republic) Lukáš Rosol	3	4

Qualifying competition
4	(Slovakia) Lukáš Lacko	6	6
(Australia) Marc Polmans	3	4
