= 2015 Shenzhen Open =

2015 Shenzhen Open may refer to:

- 2015 ATP Shenzhen Open, an ATP World Tour tennis tournament
- 2015 WTA Shenzhen Open, a WTA Tour tennis tournament

== See also ==
- 2015 Shenzhen Open – Doubles
- 2015 Shenzhen Open – Singles (disambiguation)
