= 2015 Shenzhen Open – Doubles =

2015 Shenzhen Open – Doubles may refer to:

- 2015 ATP Shenzhen Open – Doubles
- 2015 WTA Shenzhen Open – Doubles

== See also ==
- 2015 Shenzhen Open
