= 2016 Shenzhen Open – Doubles =

2016 Shenzhen Open – Doubles may refer to:

- 2016 ATP Shenzhen Open – Doubles
- 2016 WTA Shenzhen Open – Doubles

== See also ==
- 2016 Shenzhen Open (disambiguation)
