= 2016 ATP Shenzhen Open =

- Date: September 26–October 2
- Edition: 3rd
- Category: World Tour 250 series
- Draw: 28S/16D
- Surface: Hard
- Location: Shenzhen, China

Champions

Singles
- (Czech Republic) Tomáš Berdych

Doubles
- (Italy) Fabio Fognini / (Sweden) Robert Lindstedt
← 2015 ·	ATP Shenzhen Open	· 2017 →

The 2016 ATP Shenzhen Open was a professional men's tennis tournament played on hard courts. It was the third edition of the tournament, and part of the ATP World Tour 250 series of the 2016 ATP World Tour. It took place at the Shenzhen Longgang Tennis Centre in Shenzhen, China from September 26 to October 2.

== Singles main draw entrants ==
=== Seeds ===
Country	Player	Rank^{1}	Seed
CZE	Tomáš Berdych	9	1
BEL	David Goffin	14	2
FRA	Richard Gasquet	17	3
AUS	Bernard Tomic	22	4
~~GER~~	~~Alexander Zverev~~	~~27~~	~~5~~
FRA	Benoît Paire	38	6
ITA	Fabio Fognini	43	7
CZE	Jiří Veselý	51	8

- ^{1} Rankings are as of September 19, 2016

=== Other entrants ===
The following players received wildcards into the singles main draw:

- (China) Li Zhe
- (Japan) Akira Santillan
- (China) Zhang Ze

The following players received entry using a protected ranking:

- (Spain) Pablo Andújar
- (Serbia) Janko Tipsarević

The following players received entry from the qualifying draw:

- (United States) Ryan Harrison
- (Italy) Luca Vanni
- (Australia) Andrew Whittington
- (Germany) Mischa Zverev

The following player received entry as a lucky loser:

- (Italy) Thomas Fabbiano

=== Withdrawals ===
Before the tournament

- (Ukraine) Alexandr Dolgopolov →replaced by (Spain) Íñigo Cervantes
- (United Kingdom) Daniel Evans →replaced by (Czech Republic) Lukáš Rosol
- (United States) Taylor Fritz →replaced by (Japan) Yoshihito Nishioka
- (Germany) Alexander Zverev →replaced by (Italy) Thomas Fabbiano

=== Retirements ===
- (Serbia) Janko Tipsarević

== Doubles main draw entrants ==
=== Seeds ===
Country	Player	Country	Player	Rank^{1}	Seed
PHI	Treat Huey	BLR	Max Mirnyi	41	1
AUT	Oliver Marach	FRA	Fabrice Martin	67	2
CRO	Mate Pavić	NZL	Michael Venus	75	3
AUS	Chris Guccione	BRA	André Sá	88	4

- ^{1} Rankings are as of September 19, 2016

=== Other entrants ===
The following pairs received wildcards into the doubles main draw:

- (China) Gong Maoxin / (China) Zhang Ze
- (China) Li Zhe / (China) Zhang Zhizhen

== Champions ==
=== Singles ===
- (Czech Republic) Tomáš Berdych def. (France) Richard Gasquet, 7–6^{(7–5)}, 6–7^{(2–7)}, 6–3

=== Doubles ===
- (Italy) Fabio Fognini / (Sweden) Robert Lindstedt def. (Croatia) Mate Pavić / (New Zealand) Michael Venus, 7–6^{(7–4)}, 6–3
