= 2018 Shenzhen Open – Doubles =

2018 Shenzhen Open – Doubles may refer to:

- 2018 ATP Shenzhen Open – Doubles
- 2018 WTA Shenzhen Open – Doubles

== See also ==
- 2018 Shenzhen Open (disambiguation)
