= 2016 Shenzhen Open =

2016 Shenzhen Open may refer to:

- 2016 ATP Shenzhen Open, an ATP World Tour tennis tournament
- 2016 WTA Shenzhen Open, a WTA Tour tennis tournament

== See also ==
- 2016 Shenzhen Open – doubles (disambiguation)
- 2016 Shenzhen Open – singles (disambiguation)
