= 2016 Shenzhen Open – Singles =

2016 Shenzhen Open – Singles may refer to:

- 2016 ATP Shenzhen Open – Singles
- 2016 WTA Shenzhen Open – Singles

== See also ==
- 2016 Shenzhen Open (disambiguation)
