= 2015 Shenzhen Open – Singles =

2015 Shenzhen Open – singles may refer to:

- 2015 ATP Shenzhen Open – Singles
- 2015 WTA Shenzhen Open – Singles

== See also ==
- 2015 Shenzhen Open
