= 2018 ATP Shenzhen Open =

- Date: September 24–30
- Edition: 5th
- Category: World Tour 250 series
- Draw: 28S/16D
- Surface: Hard
- Location: Shenzhen, China

Champions

Singles
- (Japan) Yoshihito Nishioka

Doubles
- (Japan) Ben McLachlan / (United Kingdom) Joe Salisbury
| ← 2017 · | ATP Shenzhen Open |

The 2018 ATP Shenzhen Open was a professional men's tennis tournament played on hard courts. It was the 5th edition of the tournament, and part of the ATP World Tour 250 series of the 2018 ATP World Tour. It took place at the Shenzhen Longgang Tennis Centre in Shenzhen, China from September 24 to 30.

== Singles main draw entrants ==
=== Seeds ===
| Country | Player | Rank^{1} | Seed |
|---|---|---|---|
| BEL | David Goffin | 11 | 1 |
| GRE | Stefanos Tsitsipas | 15 | 2 |
| CRO | Borna Ćorić | 18 | 3 |
| BIH | Damir Džumhur | 28 | 4 |
| ESP | Fernando Verdasco | 29 | 5 |
| CAN | Denis Shapovalov | 34 | 6 |
| AUS | Alex de Minaur | 38 | 7 |
| ITA | Andreas Seppi | 47 | 8 |

- ^{1} Rankings are as of September 17, 2018

=== Other entrants ===
- (United Kingdom) Andy Murray
- (China) Wu Di
- (China) Zhang Zhizhen

The following players received entry from the qualifying draw:

- (Japan) Tatsuma Ito
- (Chinese Taipei) Jason Jung
- (Japan) Yoshihito Nishioka
- (India) Ramkumar Ramanathan

=== Withdrawals ===
Before the tournament

- (Uzbekistan) Denis Istomin →replaced by (United States) Mackenzie McDonald
- (France) Benoît Paire →replaced by (Czech Republic) Jiří Veselý

=== Retirements ===
- (Spain) Guillermo García López
- (Slovakia) Lukáš Lacko
- (China) Zhang Zhizhen

== Doubles main draw entrants ==
=== Seeds ===
| Country | Player | Country | Player | Rank^{1} | Seed |
|---|---|---|---|---|---|
| JPN | Ben McLachlan | GBR | Joe Salisbury | 63 | 1 |
| NZL | Marcus Daniell | NED | Wesley Koolhof | 87 | 2 |
| CZE | Roman Jebavý | ARG | Andrés Molteni | 97 | 3 |
| SWE | Robert Lindstedt | USA | Rajeev Ram | 98 | 4 |

- ^{1} Rankings are as of September 1, 2018

=== Other entrants ===
The following pairs received wildcards into the doubles main draw:

- (China) Li Zhe / (China) Wu Di
- (China) Sun Fajing / (China) Zhang Zhizhen

=== Withdrawals ===
During the tournament

- (United States) Denis Kudla

== Champions ==
=== Singles ===
- (Japan) Yoshihito Nishioka def. (France) Pierre-Hugues Herbert, 7–5, 2–6, 6–4

=== Doubles ===
- (Japan) Ben McLachlan / (United Kingdom) Joe Salisbury def. (Sweden) Robert Lindstedt / (United States) Rajeev Ram, 7–6^{(7–5)}, 7–6^{(7–4)}.
