= 2018 Shenzhen Open =

2018 Shenzhen Open may refer to:

- 2018 ATP Shenzhen Open, an ATP World Tour tennis tournament
- 2018 WTA Shenzhen Open, a WTA Tour tennis tournament

== See also ==
- 2018 Shenzhen Open – Singles (disambiguation)
- 2018 Shenzhen Open – Doubles (disambiguation)
