= 2017 ATP Shenzhen Open – Doubles =

Doubles
- 2017 ATP Shenzhen Open

Final
- Champions: (Austria) Alexander Peya (United States) Rajeev Ram
- Runners-up: (Croatia) Nikola Mektić (United States) Nicholas Monroe
- Score: 6–3, 6–2

Events
Singles	Doubles
← 2016 ·	ATP Shenzhen Open	· 2018 →

Fabio Fognini and Robert Lindstedt were the defending champions but chose not to participate this year.

Alexander Peya and Rajeev Ram won the title, defeating Nikola Mektić and Nicholas Monroe in the final, 6–3, 6–2.

== Seeds ==
1. (Croatia) Nikola Mektić / (United States) Nicholas Monroe (final)
2. (Austria) Alexander Peya / (United States) Rajeev Ram (champions)
3. (Brazil) Marcelo Melo / (Germany) Alexander Zverev (quarterfinals, withdrew)
4. (Netherlands) Wesley Koolhof / (New Zealand) Artem Sitak (first round)

== Draw ==
=== Key ===
- Q = Qualifier
- WC = Wild card
- LL = Lucky loser
- Alt = Alternate
- SE = Special exempt
- PR = Protected ranking
- ITF = ITF entry
- JE = Junior exempt
- w/o = Walkover
- r = Retired
- d = Defaulted
- SR = Special ranking

=== Draw ===
First round
1	(Croatia) N Mektić (United States) N Monroe	4	7^{7}	[10]
(Spain) D Marrero (Portugal) J Sousa	6	6^{3}	[7]
(United States) S Lipsky (Canada) A Shamasdin	6	6^{1}	[10]
WC	(China) Y Bai (China) Zh Zhang	4	7^{7}	[6]
3	(Brazil) M Melo (Germany) A Zverev	7^{7}	6
(Chile) H Podlipnik-Castillo (Belarus) A Vasilevski	6^{5}	4
(Czech Republic) R Jebavý (Netherlands) M Middelkoop	5	7	[11]
(Brazil) A Sá (Israel) D Sela	7	5	[13]
WC	(China) M Gong (China) Ze Zhang	6^{5}	1
(Belarus) M Mirnyi (Austria) P Oswald	7^{7}	6
(Germany) A Begemann (Croatia) F Škugor	7	7^{7}
4	(Netherlands) W Koolhof (New Zealand) A Sitak	5	6^{5}
(Brazil) R Dutra Silva (Italy) P Lorenzi	6^{6}	4
(Spain) M Granollers (Tunisia) M Jaziri	7^{8}	6
(India) L Paes (India) P Raja	2	0^{r}
2	(Austria) A Peya (United States) R Ram	6	1

Quarterfinals
1	(Croatia) N Mektić (United States) N Monroe	6	7
(United States) S Lipsky (Canada) A Shamasdin	3	5
3	(Brazil) M Melo (Germany) A Zverev
(Brazil) A Sá (Israel) D Sela	w/o
(Belarus) M Mirnyi (Austria) P Oswald	6	7
(Germany) A Begemann (Croatia) F Škugor	4	5
(Spain) M Granollers (Tunisia) M Jaziri	3	1
2	(Austria) A Peya (United States) R Ram	6	6

Semifinals
1	(Croatia) N Mektić (United States) N Monroe	6	7^{7}
(Brazil) A Sá (Israel) D Sela	3	6^{4}
(Belarus) M Mirnyi (Austria) P Oswald	4	6	[3]
2	(Austria) A Peya (United States) R Ram	6	3	[10]

Final
1	(Croatia) N Mektić (United States) N Monroe	3	2
2	(Austria) A Peya (United States) R Ram	6	6
