= 2015 ATP Shenzhen Open =

- Date: September 28–October 4
- Edition: 2nd
- Category: World Tour 250 series
- Draw: 32S/16D
- Surface: Hard
- Location: Shenzhen, China

Champions

Singles
- (Czech Republic) Tomáš Berdych

Doubles
- (Israel) Jonathan Erlich / (United Kingdom) Colin Fleming
← 2014 ·	ATP Shenzhen Open	· 2016 →

The 2015 ATP Shenzhen Open was a professional men's tennis tournament played on hard courts. It was the second edition of the tournament, and part of the ATP World Tour 250 series of the 2015 ATP World Tour. It took place at the Shenzhen Longgang Tennis Centre in Shenzhen, China from September 28 to October 4.

== Singles main draw entrants ==
=== Seeds ===
Country	Player	Rank^{1}	Seed
CZE	Tomáš Berdych	5	1
CRO	Marin Čilić	14	2
ESP	Tommy Robredo	27	3
ESP	Guillermo García-López	31	4
FRA	Adrian Mannarino	39	5
CZE	Jiří Veselý	40	6
GBR	Aljaž Bedene	55	7
DOM	Víctor Estrella Burgos	56	8

- ^{1} Rankings are as of September 21, 2015

=== Other entrants ===
The following players received wildcards into the singles main draw:

- (China) Bai Yan
- (China) Wu Di
- (China) Zhang Ze

The following players received entry from the qualifying draw:

- (Australia) Matthew Ebden
- (Japan) Hiroki Moriya
- (Japan) Takuto Niki
- (China) Zhang Zhizhen

=== Withdrawals ===
Before the tournament

- (Spain) Pablo Andújar →replaced by Hyeon Chung
- (Croatia) Borna Ćorić →replaced by Austin Krajicek
- (Slovakia) Martin Kližan →replaced by James Duckworth
- (Germany) Philipp Kohlschreiber →replaced by Go Soeda
- (United States) Donald Young →replaced by John Millman

During the tournament

- (France) Adrian Mannarino (Right Hip Impingement)

=== Retirements ===
- (Dominican Republic) Victor Estrella Burgos (Upper Back Injury)
- (Latvia) Ernests Gulbis (Right Wrist Injury)

== Doubles main draw entrants ==
=== Seeds ===
Country	Player	Country	Player	Rank^{1}	Seed
GBR	Dominic Inglot	SWE	Robert Lindstedt	49	1
POL	Łukasz Kubot	PAK	Aisam-ul-Haq Qureshi	75	2
AUS	Chris Guccione	BRA	André Sá	107	3
AUT	Julian Knowle	AUT	Oliver Marach	108	4

- ^{1} Rankings are as of September 21, 2015

=== Other entrants ===
The following pairs received wildcards into the doubles main draw:

- (China) Bai Yan / (China) Wu Di
- (China) Gong Maoxin / (New Zealand) Michael Venus

== Champions ==
=== Singles ===
- (Czech Republic) Tomáš Berdych def. (Spain) Guillermo García-López 6-3,7-6^{(9-7)}

=== Doubles ===
- (Israel) Jonathan Erlich / (United Kingdom) Colin Fleming def. (Australia) Chris Guccione / (Brazil) André Sá 6-1,6-7^{(3-7)},[10-6]
