= 2015 ATP Shenzhen Open – Singles =

Singles
- 2015 ATP Shenzhen Open

Final
- Champion: (Czech Republic) Tomáš Berdych
- Runner-up: (Spain) Guillermo García López
- Score: 6–3, 7–6^{(9–7)}

Events
Singles	Doubles
- ATP Shenzhen Open

Andy Murray was the defending champion but chose not to participate this year.
Tomáš Berdych won the title, defeating Guillermo García López in the final, 6–3, 7–6^{(9–7)}.

== Seeds ==
The top four seeds received a bye into the second round.

1. (Czech Republic) Tomáš Berdych (champion)
2. (Croatia) Marin Čilić (semifinals)
3. (Spain) Tommy Robredo (semifinals)
4. (Spain) Guillermo García López (final)
5. (France) Adrian Mannarino (quarterfinals, withdrew)
6. (Czech Republic) Jiří Veselý (quarterfinals)
7. (United Kingdom) Aljaž Bedene (second round)
8. (Dominican Republic) Víctor Estrella Burgos (second round, retired)

== Draw ==
Key

- Q = Qualifier
- WC = Wild card
- LL = Lucky loser
- Alt = Alternate
- ITF = ITF entry
- PR = Protected ranking
- SR = Special ranking
- SE = Special exempt
- JE = Junior exempt
- JR = Junior Accelerator Programme entrant
- CO = College Accelerator Programme entrant
- NG = Next Gen Accelerator Program entrant
- w/o = Walkover
- r = Retired
- d = Defaulted

=== Finals ===
Semifinals
1	(Czech Republic) Tomáš Berdych	6	6
3	(Spain) Tommy Robredo	1	4
4	(Spain) Guillermo García López	1	7	6
2	(Croatia) Marin Čilić	6	5	3

Final
1	(Czech Republic) Tomáš Berdych	6	7^{9}
4	(Spain) Guillermo García López	3	6^{7}

=== Top half ===
First round
(United States) A Krajicek	5	7^{8}	6
(Australia) J Duckworth	7	6^{6}	1
Q	(China) Zh Zhang	6	6
(Japan) G Soeda	4	4
WC	(China) Ze Zhang	3	2
6	(Czech Republic) J Veselý	6	6
(Lithuania) R Berankis	4	3
Q	(Japan) H Moriya	6	6
(Austria) A Haider-Maurer	2	6^{2}
(Italy) S Bolelli	6	7^{7}
Q	(Australia) M Ebden	6	6^{3}	4
8	(Dominican Republic) V Estrella Burgos	4	7^{7}	6

Second round
1	(Czech Republic) T Berdych	7	6
(United States) A Krajicek	5	3
Q	(China) Zh Zhang	2	3
6	(Czech Republic) J Veselý	6	6
3	(Spain) T Robredo	7	6
Q	(Japan) H Moriya	5	3
(Italy) S Bolelli	6	4
8	(Dominican Republic) V Estrella Burgos	0	0^{r}

Quarterfinals
1	(Czech Republic) T Berdych	6	6
6	(Czech Republic) J Veselý	3	2
3	(Spain) T Robredo	1	6	6
(Italy) S Bolelli	6	2	4

Semifinals
1	(Czech Republic) T Berdych	6	6
3	(Spain) T Robredo	1	4

=== Bottom half ===
First round
5	(France) A Mannarino	6	6
(France) L Pouille	0	3
WC	(China) Y Bai	6	7
Q	(Japan) T Niki	1	5
(Uzbekistan) D Istomin	6^{4}	4
(Czech Republic) L Rosol	7^{7}	6
7	(United Kingdom) A Bedene	6	6
(Russia) M Youzhny	3	3
WC	(China) D Wu	1	0
(South Korea) H Chung	6	6
(Latvia) E Gulbis	6^{6}	0^{r}
(Australia) J Millman	7^{8}	2

Second round
5	(France) A Mannarino	7	7^{9}
WC	(China) Y Bai	5	6^{7}
(Czech Republic) L Rosol	4	3
4	(Spain) G García López	6	6
7	(United Kingdom) A Bedene	2	0
(South Korea) H Chung	6	6
(Australia) J Millman	3	6	3
2	(Croatia) M Čilić	6	4	6

Quarterfinals
5	(France) A Mannarino
4	(Spain) G García López	w/o
(South Korea) H Chung	6^{6}	4
2	(Croatia) M Čilić	7^{8}	6

Semifinals
4	(Spain) G García López	1	7	6
2	(Croatia) M Čilić	6	5	3

== Qualifying ==
=== Seeds ===
1. (United States) Austin Krajicek (moved to main draw)
2. (Australia) Matthew Ebden
3. (Chinese Taipei) Chen Ti (second round)
4. (Australia) Luke Saville (second round)
5. (Japan) Hiroki Moriya
6. (South Korea) Lee Duck-hee (second round)
7. (China) Bai Yan (Received wildcard to main draw)
8. (Russia) Mikhail Elgin (second round)

=== Qualifiers ===
1. (Japan) Takuto Niki
2. (Australia) Matthew Ebden
3. (Japan) Hiroki Moriya
4. (China) Zhang Zhizhen

=== Qualifying draw ===
==== First qualifier ====
First round				Second round				Qualifying competition
					Bye
(South Korea) Woo Chung-hyo	3	1			(China) Sun Fajing
(China) Sun Fajing	6	6						(China) Sun Fajing	1	4
(Japan) Takuto Niki	4	6	6					(Japan) Takuto Niki	6	6
(China) Chen Long	6	2	1		(Japan) Takuto Niki	6	7
				8	(Russia) Mikhail Elgin	4	5

==== Second qualifier ====
First round			Second round					Qualifying competition
			2	(Australia) Matthew Ebden	6	7^{7}
				(United States) Nicholas Alexander Reyes	3	6^{1}
								2	(Australia) Matthew Ebden	6	6
(China) Qiu Zhuoyang	2	1							(New Zealand) Michael Venus	2	2
(New Zealand) Michael Venus	6	6		(New Zealand) Michael Venus	3	7^{10}	6
			6	(South Korea) Lee Duck-hee	6	6^{8}	1

==== Third qualifier ====
First round				Second round					Qualifying competition
				3	(Chinese Taipei) Chen Ti	4	6	4
(France) Johan Tatlot	6	4	6		(France) Johan Tatlot	6	1	6
(China) He Yecong	1	6	4							(France) Johan Tatlot	5	3
(Serbia) Djordje Djokovic	2	6	3						5	(Japan) Hiroki Moriya	7	6
(China) Xia Haitong	6	3	6		(China) Xia Haitong	1	3
				5	(Japan) Hiroki Moriya	6	6

==== Fourth qualifier ====
First round				Second round					Qualifying competition
				4	(Australia) Luke Saville	6	3	2
WC	(China) Zhu Jiacheng	2	2		(China) Zhang Zhizhen	3	6	6
	(China) Zhang Zhizhen	6	6						(China) Zhang Zhizhen	6	6
	(Belarus) Sergey Betov	6	6						(Belarus) Sergey Betov	2	3
	(Austria) Oliver Marach	4	0		(Belarus) Sergey Betov
					Bye
