= 2018 ATP Shenzhen Open – Doubles =

Doubles
- 2018 ATP Shenzhen Open

Final
- Champions: (Japan) Ben McLachlan (United Kingdom) Joe Salisbury
- Runners-up: (Sweden) Robert Lindstedt (United States) Rajeev Ram
- Score: 7–6^{(7–5)}, 7–6^{(7–4)}

Events
Singles	Doubles
← 2017 ·	ATP Shenzhen Open

Alexander Peya and Rajeev Ram were the defending champions but Peya could not participate due to injury. Ram played alongside Robert Lindstedt but lost in the final to Ben McLachlan and Joe Salisbury, 6–7^{(5–7)}, 6–7^{(4–7)}.

== Seeds ==
1. (Japan) Ben McLachlan / (United Kingdom) Joe Salisbury (champions)
2. (New Zealand) Marcus Daniell / (Netherlands) Wesley Koolhof (quarterfinals)
3. (Czech Republic) Roman Jebavý / (Argentina) Andrés Molteni (semifinals)
4. (Sweden) Robert Lindstedt / (United States) Rajeev Ram (final)

== Draw ==
=== Key ===
- Q = Qualifier
- WC = Wild card
- LL = Lucky loser
- Alt = Alternate
- SE = Special exempt
- PR = Protected ranking
- ITF = ITF entry
- JE = Junior exempt
- w/o = Walkover
- r = Retired
- d = Defaulted
- SR = Special ranking

=== Draw ===
First round
WC	(China) F Sun (China) Zh Zhang	4	2
(Poland) M Matkowski (United States) N Monroe	6	6
3	(Czech Republic) R Jebavý (Argentina) A Molteni	6	6
(Japan) T Daniel (United States) M McDonald	1	2
(United States) D Kudla (United Kingdom) C Norrie	7^{7}	6
(Serbia) D Lajović (Serbia) V Troicki	6^{5}	4
(Spain) D Marrero (Italy) A Seppi	6	1	[7]
WC	(China) Z Li (China) D Wu	2	6	[10]
(Australia) A de Minaur (Australia) B Mousley	4	4
4	(Sweden) R Lindstedt (United States) R Ram	6	6
(France) F Martin (Spain) A Ramos Viñolas	3	7^{7}	[8]
(Belarus) M Mirnyi (Austria) P Oswald	6	6^{5}	[10]
(Chinese Taipei) C-p Hsieh (Thailand) So Ratiwatana	6^{5}	5
2	(New Zealand) M Daniell (Netherlands) W Koolhof	7^{7}	7

Quarterfinals
1	(Japan) B McLachlan (United Kingdom) J Salisbury	6	6
(Poland) M Matkowski (United States) N Monroe	4	4
3	(Czech Republic) R Jebavý (Argentina) A Molteni	w/o
(United States) D Kudla (United Kingdom) C Norrie
WC	(China) Z Li (China) D Wu	3	3
4	(Sweden) R Lindstedt (United States) R Ram	6	6
(Belarus) M Mirnyi (Austria) P Oswald	6	6
2	(New Zealand) M Daniell (Netherlands) W Koolhof	4	2

Semifinals
1	(Japan) B McLachlan (United Kingdom) J Salisbury	6	7^{7}
3	(Czech Republic) R Jebavý (Argentina) A Molteni	4	6^{4}
4	(Sweden) R Lindstedt (United States) R Ram	7^{7}	6
(Belarus) M Mirnyi (Austria) P Oswald	6^{4}	3

Final
1	(Japan) B McLachlan (United Kingdom) J Salisbury	7^{7}	7^{7}
4	(Sweden) R Lindstedt (United States) R Ram	6^{5}	6^{4}
