= 2015 ATP Shenzhen Open – Doubles =

Doubles
- 2015 ATP Shenzhen Open

Final
- Champions: (Israel) Jonathan Erlich (United Kingdom) Colin Fleming
- Runners-up: (Australia) Chris Guccione (Brazil) André Sá
- Score: 6–1, 6–7^{(3–7)}, [10–6]

Events
Singles	Doubles
← 2014 ·	ATP Shenzhen Open	· 2016 →

Jean-Julien Rojer and Horia Tecău were the defending champions but chose not to participate. Jonathan Erlich and Colin Fleming won the title, defeating Chris Guccione and André Sá in the final, 6–1, 6–7^{(3–7)}, [10–6].

== Seeds ==
1. (United Kingdom) Dominic Inglot / (Sweden) Robert Lindstedt (semifinals)
2. (Poland) Łukasz Kubot / (Pakistan) Aisam-ul-Haq Qureshi (first round)
3. (Australia) Chris Guccione / (Brazil) André Sá (final)
4. (Austria) Julian Knowle / (Austria) Oliver Marach (quarterfinals)

== Draw ==
=== Key ===
- Q = Qualifier
- WC = Wild card
- LL = Lucky loser
- Alt = Alternate
- SE = Special exempt
- PR = Protected ranking
- ITF = ITF entry
- JE = Junior exempt
- w/o = Walkover
- r = Retired
- d = Defaulted
- SR = Special ranking

=== Draw ===
First round
1	(United Kingdom) D Inglot (Sweden) R Lindstedt	6	6
(Dominican Republic) V Estrella Burgos (United States) N Monroe	3	4
(Australia) J Duckworth (Australia) J Millman	6	6
WC	(China) Y Bai (China) D Wu	4	2
3	(Australia) C Guccione (Brazil) A Sá	6	7
(Chinese Taipei) T Chen (United States) A Krajicek	1	5
(Germany) G Kretschmer (Germany) A Satschko	2	3
(Belarus) S Betov (Russia) M Elgin	6	6
WC	(China) M Gong (New Zealand) M Venus	6	6^{4}	[12]
(France) A Mannarino (Czech Republic) L Rosol	1	7^{7}	[10]
(Lithuania) R Berankis (Uzbekistan) D Istomin	4	5
4	(Austria) J Knowle (Austria) O Marach	6	7
(Israel) J Erlich (United Kingdom) C Fleming	7	6
(United Kingdom) A Bedene (Spain) G García-López	5	3
(Australia) M Ebden (Czech Republic) J Veselý	6	4	[10]
2	(Poland) Ł Kubot (Pakistan) A-u-H Qureshi	3	6	[8]

Quarterfinals
1	(United Kingdom) D Inglot (Sweden) R Lindstedt	6	6
(Australia) J Duckworth (Australia) J Millman	4	3
3	(Australia) C Guccione (Brazil) A Sá	6	6
(Belarus) S Betov (Russia) M Elgin	3	2
WC	(China) M Gong (New Zealand) M Venus	6	7
4	(Austria) J Knowle (Austria) O Marach	3	5
(Israel) J Erlich (United Kingdom) C Fleming	6	6
(Australia) M Ebden (Czech Republic) J Veselý	3	3

Semifinals
1	(United Kingdom) D Inglot (Sweden) R Lindstedt	6^{5}	6^{3}
3	(Australia) C Guccione (Brazil) A Sá	7^{7}	7^{7}
WC	(China) M Gong (New Zealand) M Venus	2	4
(Israel) J Erlich (United Kingdom) C Fleming	6	6

Final
3	(Australia) C Guccione (Brazil) A Sá	1	7^{7}	[6]
(Israel) J Erlich (United Kingdom) C Fleming	6	6^{3}	[10]
