= 2018 ATP Shenzhen Open – Singles =

Singles
- 2018 ATP Shenzhen Open

Final
- Champion: (Japan) Yoshihito Nishioka
- Runner-up: (France) Pierre-Hugues Herbert
- Score: 7–5, 2–6, 6–4

Details
- Draw: 28 (4 Q / 3 WC )

Events
Singles	Doubles
← 2017 ·	ATP Shenzhen Open

David Goffin was the defending champion, but lost in the second round to Andy Murray.

Yoshihito Nishioka won his first ATP title, defeating Pierre-Hugues Herbert in the final, 7–5, 2–6, 6–4.

== Seeds ==
The top four seeds receive a bye into the second round.

1. (Belgium) David Goffin (second round)
2. (Greece) Stefanos Tsitsipas (second round)
3. (Croatia) Borna Ćorić (second round)
4. (Bosnia and Herzegovina) Damir Džumhur (quarterfinals)
5. (Spain) Fernando Verdasco (semifinals)
6. (Canada) Denis Shapovalov (second round)
7. (Australia) Alex de Minaur (semifinals)
8. (Italy) Andreas Seppi (first round)

== Draw ==
=== Key ===
- Q = Qualifier
- WC = Wild card
- LL = Lucky loser
- Alt = Alternate
- ITF = ITF entry
- PR = Protected ranking
- SR = Special ranking
- SE = Special exempt
- JE = Junior exempt
- JR = Junior Accelerator Programme entrant
- CO = College Accelerator Programme entrant
- NG = Next Gen Accelerator Program entrant
- w/o = Walkover
- r = Retired
- d = Defaulted

=== Finals ===
Semifinals
5	(Spain) Fernando Verdasco	6	3	6^{5}
Q	(Japan) Yoshihito Nishioka	1	6	7^{7}
7	(Australia) Alex de Minaur	5	6	6^{8}
(France) Pierre-Hugues Herbert	7	2	7^{10}

Finals
Q	(Japan) Yoshihito Nishioka	7	2	6
(France) Pierre-Hugues Herbert	5	6	4

=== Top half ===
First round
WC	(China) Zh Zhang	3	7^{7}	2^{r}
WC	(United Kingdom) A Murray	6	6^{3}	4
Q	(Japan) T Ito	6	5	6^{5}
(Japan) T Daniel	2	7	7^{7}
Q	(Chinese Taipei) J Jung	3	2
5	(Spain) F Verdasco	6	6
WC	(China) D Wu	2	2
(United Kingdom) C Norrie	6	6
Q	(Japan) Y Nishioka	6	6
(United States) D Kudla	1	3
(Belarus) I Ivashka	5	6	3
6	(Canada) D Shapovalov	7	2	6

Second round
1	(Belgium) D Goffin	3	4
WC	(United Kingdom) A Murray	6	6
(Japan) T Daniel	6	2	5
5	(Spain) F Verdasco	3	6	7
3	(Croatia) B Ćorić	4	6^{8}
(United Kingdom) C Norrie	6	7^{10}
Q	(Japan) Y Nishioka	7^{7}	3	7
6	(Canada) D Shapovalov	6^{5}	6	5

Quarterfinals
WC	(United Kingdom) A Murray	4	4
5	(Spain) F Verdasco	6	6
(United Kingdom) C Norrie	6^{2}	2
Q	(Japan) Y Nishioka	7^{7}	6

Semifinals
5	(Spain) F Verdasco	6	3	6^{5}
Q	(Japan) Y Nishioka	1	6	7^{7}

=== Bottom half ===
First round
7	(Australia) A de Minaur	6	6
(Japan) Y Sugita	3	0
(Slovakia) L Lacko	7	0	0^{r}
(United States) M McDonald	5	6	5
Q	(India) R Ramanathan	7	6
(Czech Republic) J Veselý	5	1
8	(Italy) A Seppi	7^{7}	6^{7}	3
(Spain) A Ramos Viñolas	6^{5}	7^{9}	6
(Spain) G García López	3^{r}
(Serbia) V Troicki	5
(Serbia) D Lajović	4	3
(France) P-H Herbert	6	6

Second round
7	(Australia) A de Minaur	1	7^{7}	6
(United States) M McDonald	6	6^{1}	0
Q	(India) R Ramanathan	4	2
4	(Bosnia and Herzegovina) D Džumhur	6	6
(Spain) A Ramos Viñolas	7^{7}	4	7^{7}
(Serbia) V Troicki	6^{4}	6	6^{3}
(France) P-H Herbert	6	7^{7}
2	(Greece) S Tsitsipas	3	6^{4}

Quarterfinals
7	(Australia) A de Minaur	6	7^{9}
4	(Bosnia and Herzegovina) D Džumhur	3	6^{7}
(Spain) A Ramos Viñolas	7^{8}	6^{1}	4
(France) P-H Herbert	6^{6}	7^{7}	6

Semifinals
7	(Australia) A de Minaur	5	6	6^{8}
(France) P-H Herbert	7	2	7^{10}

== Qualifying ==
=== Seeds ===
1. (United States) Tim Smyczek (moved to Chengdu Open main draw)
2. (Chinese Taipei) Jason Jung (qualified)
3. (India) Ramkumar Ramanathan (qualified)
4. (Japan) Yoshihito Nishioka (qualified)
5. (Japan) Tatsuma Ito (qualified)
6. (Canada) Filip Peliwo (qualifying competition)
7. (Japan) Go Soeda (first round)
8. (Egypt) Mohamed Safwat (first round, retired)

=== Qualifiers ===
1. (Japan) Tatsuma Ito
2. (Chinese Taipei) Jason Jung
3. (India) Ramkumar Ramanathan
4. (Japan) Yoshihito Nishioka

=== Qualifying draw ===
==== First qualifier ====
First round
Alt	(Australia) Bradley Mousley	7^{7}	6
WC	(China) Sun Fajing	6^{2}	3
(Italy) Federico Gaio	6	3	1
5	(Japan) Tatsuma Ito	4	6	6

Qualifying competition
Alt	(Australia) Bradley Mousley	2	0^{r}
5	(Japan) Tatsuma Ito	6	2

==== Second qualifier ====
First round
2	(Chinese Taipei) Jason Jung	6	7^{7}
(United Kingdom) James Ward	4	6^{3}
(Canada) Brayden Schnur	6	7
7	(Japan) Go Soeda	4	5

Qualifying competition
2	(Chinese Taipei) Jason Jung	7^{7}	6
(Canada) Brayden Schnur	6^{3}	2

==== Third qualifier ====
First round
3	(India) Ramkumar Ramanathan	3	6	7^{7}
(Australia) Max Purcell	6	3	6^{3}
WC	(China) He Yecong	3	6
8	(Egypt) Mohamed Safwat	6	6^{r}

Qualifying competition
3	(India) Ramkumar Ramanathan	6	6
WC	(China) He Yecong	1	1

==== Fourth qualifier ====
First round
4	(Japan) Yoshihito Nishioka	6	6
(Kazakhstan) Alexander Bublik	3	4
(China) Li Zhe	2	7	2
6	(Canada) Filip Peliwo	6	5	6

Qualifying competition
4	(Japan) Yoshihito Nishioka	6	6
6	(Canada) Filip Peliwo	2	0
