= 2016 ATP Shenzhen Open – Doubles =

Doubles
- 2016 ATP Shenzhen Open

Final
- Champions: (Italy) Fabio Fognini (Sweden) Robert Lindstedt
- Runners-up: (Austria) Oliver Marach (France) Fabrice Martin
- Score: 7–6^{(7–4)}, 6–3

Events
Singles	Doubles
← 2015 ·	ATP Shenzhen Open	· 2017 →

Jonathan Erlich and Colin Fleming were the defending champions, but chose not to participate together. Erlich played alongside Santiago González, but lost in the quarterfinals to Mate Pavić and Michael Venus. Fleming teamed up with Scott Lipsky, but lost in the first round to Mikhail Kukushkin and Stéphane Robert.

Fabio Fognini and Robert Lindstedt won the title, defeating Oliver Marach and Fabrice Martin in the final, 7–6^{(7–4)}, 6–3.

== Seeds ==
1. (Philippines) Treat Huey / (Belarus) Max Mirnyi (first round)
2. (Austria) Oliver Marach / (France) Fabrice Martin (final)
3. (Croatia) Mate Pavić / (New Zealand) Michael Venus (semifinals)
4. (Australia) Chris Guccione / (Brazil) André Sá (quarterfinals)

== Draw ==
=== Key ===
- Q = Qualifier
- WC = Wild card
- LL = Lucky loser
- Alt = Alternate
- SE = Special exempt
- PR = Protected ranking
- ITF = ITF entry
- JE = Junior exempt
- w/o = Walkover
- r = Retired
- d = Defaulted
- SR = Special ranking

=== Draw ===
First round
1	(Philippines) T Huey (Belarus) M Mirnyi	7	6^{2}	[8]
(Italy) F Fognini (Sweden) R Lindstedt	5	7^{7}	[10]
PR	(Spain) P Andújar (France) R Gasquet	1	6	[10]
(Argentina) A Molteni (Chile) H Podlipnik-Castillo	6	1	[5]
3	(Croatia) M Pavić (New Zealand) M Venus	6	6
WC	(China) M Gong (China) Ze Zhang	4	2
(Israel) J Erlich (Mexico) S González	6^{5}	6	[11]
(Czech Republic) L Rosol (Czech Republic) J Veselý	7^{7}	2	[9]
(Spain) G García-López (Tunisia) M Jaziri	4	6	[11]
PR	(Germany) A Begemann (India) L Paes	6	1	[9]
(Italy) T Fabbiano (Australia) B Tomic	6	3	[4]
4	(Australia) C Guccione (Brazil) A Sá	4	6	[10]
(Kazakhstan) M Kukushkin (France) S Robert	7^{7}	6
(United Kingdom) C Fleming (United States) S Lipsky	6^{4}	3
WC	(China) Z Li (China) Zh Zhang	3	6^{10}
2	(Austria) O Marach (France) F Martin	6	7^{12}

Quarterfinals
(Italy) F Fognini (Sweden) R Lindstedt	6	6
PR	(Spain) P Andújar (France) R Gasquet	0	1
3	(Croatia) M Pavić (New Zealand) M Venus	6	6
(Israel) J Erlich (Mexico) S González	4	4
(Spain) G García-López (Tunisia) M Jaziri	6	5	[10]
4	(Australia) C Guccione (Brazil) A Sá	4	7	[8]
(Kazakhstan) M Kukushkin (France) S Robert	4	3
2	(Austria) O Marach (France) F Martin	6	6

Semifinals
(Italy) F Fognini (Sweden) R Lindstedt	7^{7}	6
3	(Croatia) M Pavić (New Zealand) M Venus	6^{2}	3
(Spain) G García-López (Tunisia) M Jaziri	3	1
2	(Austria) O Marach (France) F Martin	6	6

Final
(Italy) F Fognini (Sweden) R Lindstedt	7^{7}	6
2	(Austria) O Marach (France) F Martin	6^{4}	3
