= 2016 ATP Shenzhen Open – Singles =

Singles
- 2016 ATP Shenzhen Open

Final
- Champion: (Czech Republic) Tomáš Berdych
- Runner-up: (France) Richard Gasquet
- Score: 7−6^{(7−5)}, 6−7^{(2−7)}, 6−3

Events
Singles	Doubles
- ATP Shenzhen Open

Tomáš Berdych was the defending champion and successfully defended his title, defeating Richard Gasquet in the final, 7−6^{(7−5)}, 6−7^{(2−7)}, 6−3 .

== Seeds ==
The top four seeds receive a bye into the second round.

1. (Czech Republic) Tomáš Berdych (champion)
2. (Belgium) David Goffin (second round)
3. (France) Richard Gasquet (final)
4. (Australia) Bernard Tomic (quarterfinals)
5. (Germany) Alexander Zverev (withdrew)
6. (France) Benoît Paire (second round)
7. (Italy) Fabio Fognini (second round)
8. (Czech Republic) Jiří Veselý (quarterfinals)

== Draw ==
Key

- Q = Qualifier
- WC = Wild card
- LL = Lucky loser
- Alt = Alternate
- ITF = ITF entry
- PR = Protected ranking
- SR = Special ranking
- SE = Special exempt
- JE = Junior exempt
- JR = Junior Accelerator Programme entrant
- CO = College Accelerator Programme entrant
- NG = Next Gen Accelerator Program entrant
- w/o = Walkover
- r = Retired
- d = Defaulted

=== Finals ===
Semifinals
1	(Czech Republic) Tomáš Berdych	6	7
(Brazil) Thomaz Bellucci	2	5
3	(France) Richard Gasquet	6	4
PR	(Serbia) Janko Tipsarević	2	1^{r}

Final
1	(Czech Republic) Tomáš Berdych	7^{7}	6^{2}	6
3	(France) Richard Gasquet	6^{5}	7^{7}	3

=== Top half ===
First round
(Kazakhstan) M Kukushkin	6	6^{2}	7^{7}
(Czech Republic) L Rosol	3	7^{7}	6^{4}
(Spain) Í Cervantes	6	7^{7}
WC	(Japan) A Santillan	2	6^{5}
PR	(Spain) P Andújar	2	6^{8}
8	(Czech Republic) J Veselý	6	7^{10}
Q	(United States) R Harrison	7	6
(Spain) G García López	5	4
(Portugal) G Elias	3	3
(Brazil) T Bellucci	6	6
(Japan) Y Nishioka	6	3	4
LL	(Italy) T Fabbiano	3	6	6

Second round
1	(Czech Republic) T Berdych	7^{9}	7^{7}
(Kazakhstan) M Kukushkin	6^{7}	6^{4}
(Spain) Í Cervantes	6^{2}	3
8	(Czech Republic) J Veselý	7^{7}	6
4	(Australia) B Tomic	6	4	7
Q	(United States) R Harrison	4	6	5
(Brazil) T Bellucci	7^{7}	7^{7}
LL	(Italy) T Fabbiano	6^{2}	6^{4}

Quarterfinals
1	(Czech Republic) T Berdych	7^{7}	3	6
8	(Czech Republic) J Veselý	6^{1}	6	2
4	(Australia) B Tomic	2	2
(Brazil) T Bellucci	6	6

Semifinals
1	(Czech Republic) T Berdych	6	7
(Brazil) T Bellucci	2	5

=== Bottom half ===
First round
7	(Italy) F Fognini	6	6
(Israel) D Sela	4	1
WC	(China) Z Li	2	3
Q	(Germany) M Zverev	6	6
Q	(Italy) L Vanni	6	6^{10}	2
Q	(Australia) A Whittington	2	7^{12}	6
6	(France) B Paire	6^{5}	7	6
(Georgia (country)) N Basilashvili	7^{7}	5	3
PR	(Serbia) J Tipsarević	7^{7}	6
WC	(China) Z Zhang	6^{3}	4
(Tunisia) M Jaziri	6	7^{7}
(France) S Robert	3	6^{5}

Second round
7	(Italy) F Fognini	6^{3}	4
Q	(Germany) M Zverev	7^{7}	6
Q	(Australia) A Whittington	1	0
3	(France) R Gasquet	6	6
6	(France) B Paire	0	7^{7}	5
PR	(Serbia) J Tipsarević	6	6^{5}	7
(Tunisia) M Jaziri	7^{7}	3	6
2	(Belgium) D Goffin	6^{2}	6	2

Quarterfinals
Q	(Germany) M Zverev	6^{4}	6^{2}
3	(France) R Gasquet	7^{7}	7^{7}
PR	(Serbia) J Tipsarević	7^{8}	6
(Tunisia) M Jaziri	6^{6}	2

Semifinals
3	(France) R Gasquet	6	4
PR	(Serbia) J Tipsarević	2	1^{r}

== Qualifying ==
=== Seeds ===
1. (United States) Ryan Harrison (qualified)
2. (Italy) Thomas Fabbiano (qualifying competition, lucky loser)
3. (Germany) Mischa Zverev (qualified)
4. (Slovakia) Jozef Kovalík (qualifying competition)
5. (Japan) Tatsuma Ito (first round, retired)
6. (Switzerland) Henri Laaksonen (qualifying competition)
7. (Argentina) Marco Trungelliti (first round)
8. (Italy) Luca Vanni (qualified)

=== Qualifiers ===
1. (United States) Ryan Harrison
2. (Australia) Andrew Whittington
3. (Germany) Mischa Zverev
4. (Italy) Luca Vanni

=== Lucky losers ===
1. (Italy) Thomas Fabbiano

=== Qualifying draw ===
==== First qualifier ====
First round
1	(United States) Ryan Harrison	6	6
(Indonesia) Christopher Rungkat	3	4
(Australia) James Duckworth	7	6
7	(Argentina) Marco Trungelliti	5	4

Qualifying competition
1	(United States) Ryan Harrison	4	6	6
(Australia) James Duckworth	6	4	1

==== Second qualifier ====
First round
2	(Italy) Thomas Fabbiano	6	6
(Australia) Matthew Ebden	4	1
(Australia) Andrew Whittington	3	7^{7}	2
5	(Japan) Tatsuma Ito	6	6^{5}	0^{r}

Qualifying competition
2	(Italy) Thomas Fabbiano	6^{7}	3
(Australia) Andrew Whittington	7^{9}	6

==== Third qualifier ====
First round
3	(Germany) Mischa Zverev	6	6
WC	(China) Zhu Zhicheng	1	1
(China) Te Rigele	5	4
6	(Switzerland) Henri Laaksonen	7	6

Qualifying competition
3	(Germany) Mischa Zverev	6	6
6	(Switzerland) Henri Laaksonen	2	4

==== Fourth qualifier ====
First round
4	(Slovakia) Jozef Kovalík	7^{9}	6
(China) Zhang Zhizhen	6^{7}	4
WC	(Poland) Mikołaj Borkowski	1	1
8	(Italy) Luca Vanni	6	6

Qualifying competition
4	(Slovakia) Jozef Kovalík	6	5	2
8	(Italy) Luca Vanni	4	7	6
