= ATP Shenzhen Open =

Shenzhen Open

Defunct tennis tournament
- Founded: 2014; 11 years ago
- Location: Shenzhen, Guangdong, China
- Venue: Shenzhen Longgang Tennis Center
- Category: ATP World Tour 250 series
- Surface: Hard - outdoors
- Website: shenzhenopen.cn

The Shenzhen Open was a professional outdoor hardcourts men's tennis tournament in Shenzhen, Guangdong, China, from 2014 to 2018.

It was played at the Shenzhen Longgang Tennis Center, which has 32 outdoor and indoor courts and a 4,000-seat stadium. In late 2013, the Association of Tennis Professionals announced that Shenzhen had won the ATP Thailand Open franchise, holding its inaugural ATP tournament in September 2014.

== Past finals ==
=== Men's singles ===
Year	Champions	Runners-up	Score
2014	(United Kingdom) Andy Murray	(Spain) Tommy Robredo	5–7, 7–6^{(11–9)}, 6–1
2015	(Czech Republic) Tomáš Berdych	(Spain) Guillermo García-López	6–3, 7–6^{(9–7)}
2016	(Czech Republic) Tomáš Berdych (2)	(France) Richard Gasquet	7–6^{(7–5)}, 6–7^{(2–7)}, 6–3
2017	(Belgium) David Goffin	(Ukraine) Alexandr Dolgopolov	6–4, 6–7^{(5–7)}, 6–3
2018	(Japan) Yoshihito Nishioka	(France) Pierre-Hugues Herbert	7–5, 2–6, 6–4

=== Men's doubles ===
Year	Champions	Runners-up	Score
2014	(Netherlands) Jean-Julien Rojer (Romania) Horia Tecău	(Australia) Sam Groth (Australia) Chris Guccione	6–4, 7–6^{(7–4)}
2015	(Israel) Jonathan Erlich (United Kingdom) Colin Fleming	(Australia) Chris Guccione (Brazil) André Sá	6–1, 6–7^{(3–7)}, [10–6]
2016	(Italy) Fabio Fognini (Sweden) Robert Lindstedt	(Austria) Oliver Marach (France) Fabrice Martin	7–6^{(7–4)}, 6–3
2017	(Austria) Alexander Peya (United States) Rajeev Ram	(Croatia) Nikola Mektić (United States) Nicholas Monroe	6–3, 6–2
2018	(Japan) Ben McLachlan (United Kingdom) Joe Salisbury	(Sweden) Robert Lindstedt (United States) Rajeev Ram	7–6^{(7–5)}, 7–6^{(7–4)}
