= Tomáš Berdych =

Czech tennis player (born 1985)

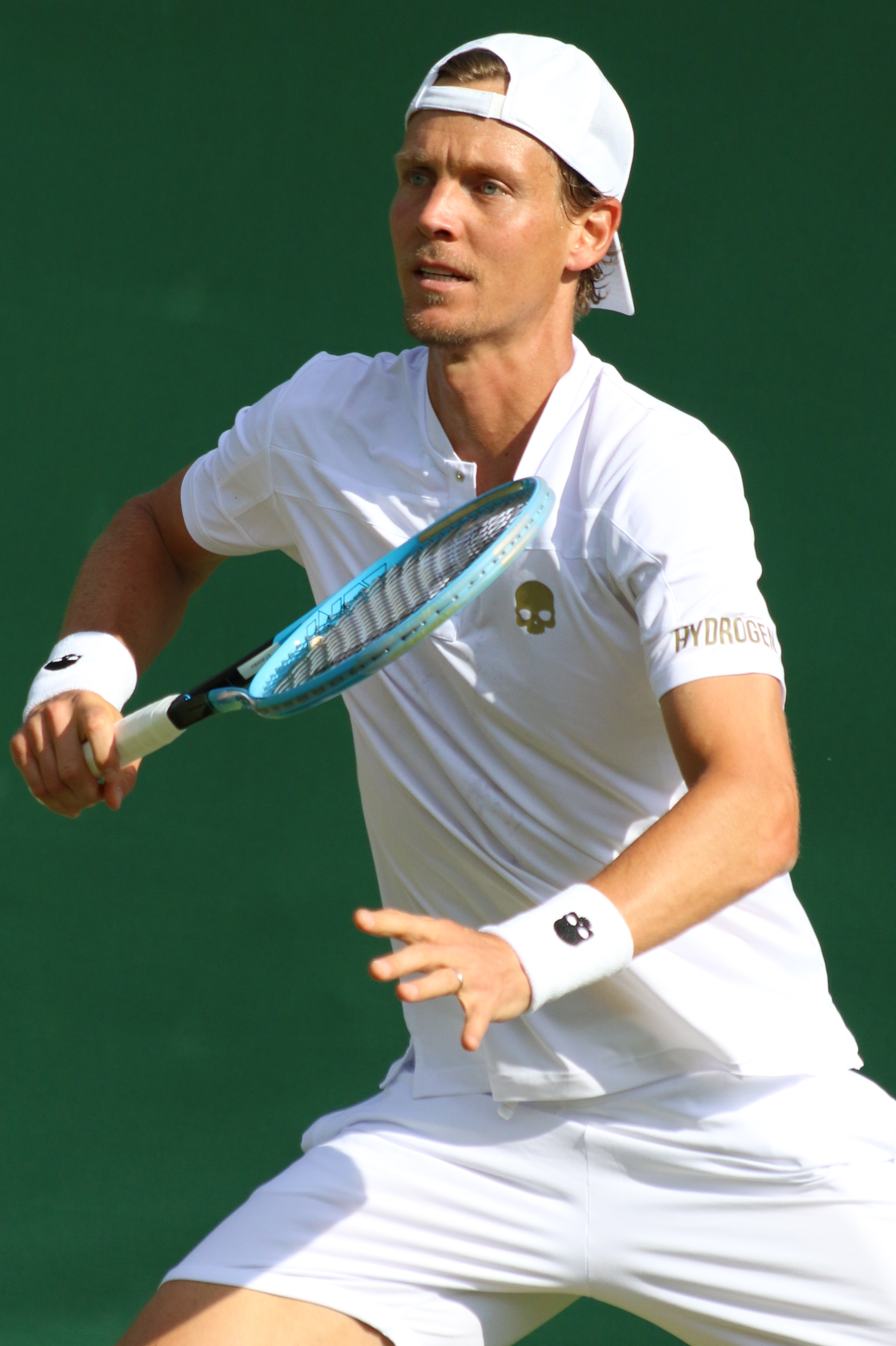
- Berdych at the 2019 Wimbledon Championships.
- Country (sports): Czech Republic
- Residence: Monte Carlo, Monaco
- Born: 17 September 1985 (age 41) Valašské Meziříčí, Czechoslovakia (now Czech Republic)
- Height: 1.96 m (6 ft 5 in)
- Turned pro: 2002
- Retired: 2019
- Plays: Right-handed (two-handed backhand)
- Coach: Jaroslav Navrátil (2002–2009); Tomáš Krupa (2009–2014); Daniel Vallverdu (2014–2016); Azuz Simcich (2014–2019); Goran Ivanišević (2016–2017); Martin Štěpánek (2018–2019)
- Prize money: US$29,491,328: 19th all-time leader in earnings
- Official website: tomasberdych.cz

Singles
- Career record: 640–342 (65.1%)
- Career titles: 13
- Highest ranking: No. 4 (18 May 2015)

Grand Slam singles results
- Australian Open: SF (2014, 2015)
- French Open: SF (2010)
- Wimbledon: F (2010)
- US Open: SF (2012)

Other tournaments
- Tour Finals: SF (2011)
- Olympic Games: QF (2004)

Doubles
- Career record: 103–112 (47.9%)
- Career titles: 2
- Highest ranking: No. 54 (10 April 2006)

Grand Slam doubles results
- Australian Open: QF (2005)
- French Open: 2R (2005)
- Wimbledon: 2R (2005)
- US Open: 2R (2004)

Team competitions
- Davis Cup: W (2012, 2013)
- Hopman Cup: W (2012)

Tomáš Berdych (Czech pronunciation: [ˈtomaːʃ ˈbɛrdɪx]; born 17 September 1985) is a Czech former professional tennis player. He was ranked world No. 4 in men's singles by the Association of Tennis Professionals (ATP) in May 2015. Berdych won 13 ATP Tour singles titles, including a Masters event at the 2005 Paris Masters. His most notable achievement was reaching the final of the 2010 Wimbledon Championships, achieved by consecutively upsetting top seed and six-time champion Roger Federer in the quarterfinals, and world No. 3 Novak Djokovic in the semifinals. Berdych reached the semifinals of all four majors during his career.

Berdych was one of the few players who could consistently challenge the Big Four, and is one of three players (alongside Jo-Wilfried Tsonga and Stan Wawrinka) to have wins over all of the Big Four at the majors. He is the second player (after David Nalbandian) to defeat Federer multiple times at majors before the semifinal stage. As well as his Paris Masters win, Berdych reached the finals of the Miami Masters in 2010, Madrid Open in 2012 and Monte Carlo Masters in 2015. He also played the longest men's doubles match ever, with Lukáš Rosol, defeating Marco Chiudinelli and Wawrinka in the first round of the 2013 Davis Cup 6–4, 5–7, 6–4, 6–7, 24–22. The match was played on 2 February 2013, lasting 7 hours, 2 minutes. It was the second-longest ATP match ever (singles and doubles combined).

== Early life ==
Berdych was born in Valašské Meziříčí, Moravia, Czechoslovakia (the Czech Republic since 1993), to Hana Berdychová and Martin Berdych. Berdych started playing tennis when he was five at the tennis centre in his hometown of Valašské Meziříčí. His father, Martin, was a train engineer and a tennis player, while his mother, Hana, is a doctor. Berdych describes his childhood as full of joy and happiness.

At the age of eight, he won the top young boys' competition in the Czech Republic in Pardubice. Berdych soon became a leading junior player, winning the Czech Republic U-12 junior title. He then moved to the city of Prostějov, where there were more practice partners and better coaches. Berdych travelled back home often to maintain ties with his old school.

Due to the harsh winters in the Czech Republic, winter preparation took place inside a sports hall. Berdych cites this as the reason he prefers hard courts, especially indoor conditions.

== Personal life ==
Berdych is a fan of ice hockey, and his favourite team is the Detroit Red Wings. He has met many Czech players from the National Hockey League and the 1998 Olympic gold medal team, including Martin Straka, Jaromír Jágr and Dominik Hašek. All of them are big tennis fans and have on several occasions come to Prostějov to play alongside Berdych. His favourite surface is the hard court, and he considers his strengths to be his forehand and serve. His fitness trainer is José Félix González Castilla.

Berdych was in a long-term relationship with tennis pro Lucie Šafářová until they broke up in 2011. He became engaged to model Ester Sátorová in late 2014. The pair married in July 2015.

Berdych is a fan of the Irish rock band U2 and would like to meet frontman Bono someday. His favourite TV show is Suits. In football, Berdych supports Manchester United.

== Career ==
=== 2001–2003: Junior US Open doubles champion and turning pro ===
As a junior Berdych reached as high as No. 6 in the world in 2003 (and No. 2 in doubles). He won the 2001 US Open Boys' Doubles title alongside Stéphane Bohli

Junior Grand Slam results:

Australian Open: 1R (2002)
French Open: 2R (2002)
Wimbledon: QF (2003)
US Open: 1R (2001)

Berdych turned professional in 2002, winning two Futures events, both in the Czech Republic, defeating Pavel Šnobel in one final and Ladislav Chramosta in the other.

In 2003, after several future and challenger wins, Berdych won his first ATP Tour match at the 2003 US Open, over Tomas Behrend in four sets, but lost in the next round to Juan Ignacio Chela.

=== 2004: First title, first win over world No. 1 ===
In 2004, Berdych focused on Challengers and the ATP Tour. In Challengers, he won in France and Germany. On the ATP Tour, he began with the 2004 Australian Open, defeating Nicolas Mahut in four sets, before losing to fourth seed Andre Agassi. He also earned victories over Galo Blanco, Björn Phau and Potito Starace on the ATP Tour. He made his debut in the 2004 French Open and at Wimbledon, but lost in the first round.

He then played at the 2004 Summer Olympics. He won in the first round against Florian Mayer and caused a major upset in the second round, defeating No. 1 Roger Federer in three sets, despite having only five ATP Tour victories. He next beat 15th seed Tommy Robredo in the round of 16, but was defeated in the quarterfinals by Taylor Dent.

After his run at the Olympics, he reached the fourth round of the 2004 US Open with victories over Jonas Björkman, Tuomas Ketola and Mikhail Youzhny, before losing to Tommy Haas in three sets.

He won his first ATP title at the Campionati Internazionali di Sicilia in Palermo, Italy, defeating David Ferrer in the semifinals and Filippo Volandri in the finals.

=== 2005: Maiden Masters title, top 30 ===
The start of Berdych's 2005 season brought losses in the first rounds in Adelaide, Sydney, and the Australian Open. He then lost in second rounds of Marseille, Rotterdam, and Dubai. He then recorded his first back-to-back wins in Indian Wells, including a win over Mario Ančić, but lost to Ivan Ljubičić. He then lost in the first rounds of Miami, Estoril, Rome, and London. He also reached the second rounds of Monte Carlo, Hamburg, the French Open, and Nottingham.

Berdych made it to the third round at Wimbledon, losing to Taylor Dent. He had a good run with a runner-up finish in the 2005 Swedish Open to Rafael Nadal, a quarterfinal loss to Nikolay Davydenko at the 2005 Stuttgart Open and a semifinals loss to James Blake at the 2005 Washington Open. He then made it to the second round of both the Canadian Open and Cincinnati Masters. Berdych lost in the third round of the 2005 US Open. He then lost early in Vienna, Madrid, Palermo, and Basel. At the 2005 Paris Masters, he won his first career ATP Masters Series title. En route to the final, he beat Jiří Novák, second seed Guillermo Coria, Juan Carlos Ferrero, Gastón Gaudio, and Radek Štěpánek. In the final he was victorious over sixth seed Ivan Ljubičić in five sets.

=== 2006: Top 10, two finals ===
In 2006, Berdych started the year at the Brisbane International, where he reached the semifinals, losing to Xavier Malisse. However, he lost early in Sydney, the Australian Open, Marseille, Rotterdam, and Dubai. He then made it to the fourth round of the Indian Wells Masters before losing to Marcos Baghdatis, and the third round of the 2006 NASDAQ–100 Open, losing to David Nalbandian. He then lost in the second rounds at Barcelona and Monte Carlo, and the third round at Rome. He reached his first French Open fourth round but lost to Roger Federer in three sets.

He then reached his first grass-court final at the Halle Open, falling to No. 1 Roger Federer in three sets. He reached the fourth round at Wimbledon, but again lost to Federer, this time in straight sets. He then made it to the semifinals at the 2006 Mercedes Cup, losing to eventual champion David Ferrer. He then played in the 2006 Rogers Cup, where he upset Rafael Nadal in three sets, before losing to Richard Gasquet in the quarterfinals. He then made it to his third straight fourth round in a Major at the 2006 US Open, losing to James Blake.

Berdych reached the finals of the 2006 Kingfisher Airlines Tennis Open, where he lost to Dmitry Tursunov. In the 2006 Madrid Masters, Berdych delivered back-to-back upsets over former No. 1 Andy Roddick, and Rafael Nadal, but lost to Fernando González in the semifinals. Following this, Berdych rose to a career-high of No. 10 for the very first time in his career. In the 2006 BNP Paribas Masters as the defending champion, he lost in the quarterfinals to Dominik Hrbatý in three sets.

Berdych ended 2006 with a year-end ranking of No. 13.

=== 2007: Third title, World Team Cup final ===
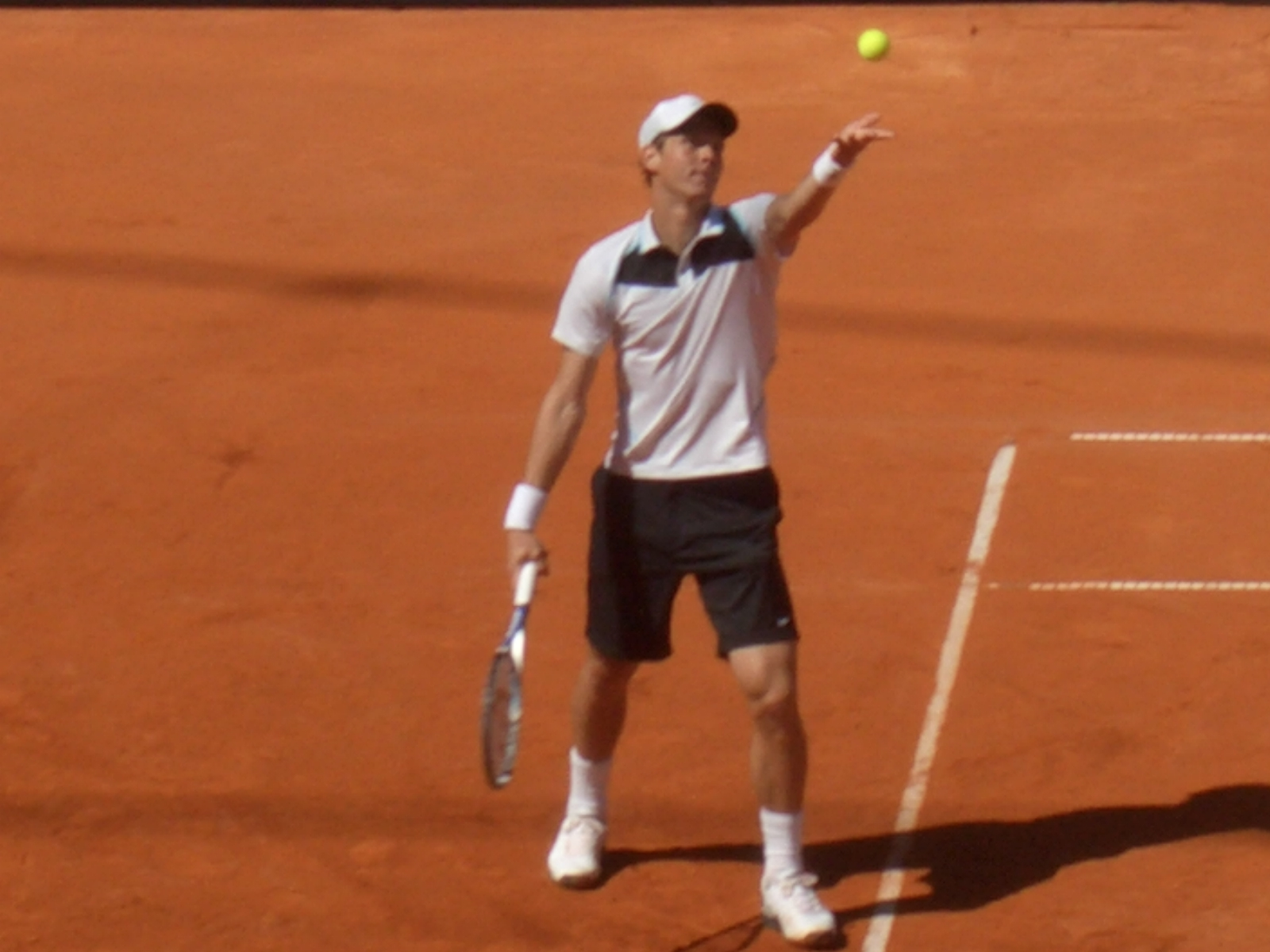
Berdych at the 2008 Hamburg Masters

Berdych began the year by making it to the quarterfinals of the 2007 Medibank International and the fourth round of the 2007 Australian Open, losing to No. 3 Nikolay Davydenko. He then had early losses in Rotterdam, Dubai, Indian Wells, and Miami. He then reached the semifinals on clay in the Monte Carlo Masters event, his best result at the event, defeating Nicolás Almagro, Benjamin Becker, fifth seed Tommy Robredo, and Robin Söderling, before losing to second seed Rafael Nadal. He also made it to the semifinals of the 2007 BMW Open, losing to Mikhail Youzhny, despite not a dropping a set before the loss. He also made it to the quarterfinals of the 2007 Rome Masters. However, despite his good run on clay, he lost in the first round of the 2007 French Open to Guillermo García López in straight sets.

Berdych then won his third ATP singles title in Halle, defeating Marcos Baghdatis, and not dropping a set en route to the title. At Wimbledon, he made it to the quarterfinals in his best performance at a Grand Slam, defeating Nicolás Massú, Michaël Llodra, Hyung-Taik Lee, and 19th seed (35th-ranked) Jonas Björkman, before losing to Rafael Nadal in straight sets. In the Canada Masters event, his first tournament since Wimbledon, as the 10th seed and defending quarterfinalist, he lost in the first round to Robin Haase, who was making his Canadian debut. The following week in Cincinnati, as the 10th seed, he made it to the third round, before losing to Nikolay Davydenko, after which he rose to a new career high of No. 9. He then made it through the fourth round at the 2007 US Open, retiring against Andy Roddick. He then reached the semifinals of the 2007 Thailand Open, losing to Benjamin Becker and the 2007 AIG Japan Open Tennis Championships, losing to Richard Gasquet. His last tournament of the year was the 2007 Paris Masters, losing to David Ferrer.

=== 2008: First ATP 500 title ===
Berdych began 2008 by competing in the Hopman Cup, but this event was affected by a stomach virus. He then entered the 2008 Medibank International, being upset by Chris Guccione in the quarterfinals. Entering the 2008 Australian Open as the 13th seed, he reached the fourth round, where he fell to Roger Federer in straight sets. At the 2008 Miami Masters, Berdych made it to the semifinals, including a win over Juan Carlos Ferrero and not dropping a set en route, but he lost to Rafael Nadal. He dropped out of the top 20 due to a sprained right ankle which caused him to miss the 2008 Monte Carlo Masters and the 2008 Rome Masters. He then reached the finals of the 2008 Swedish Open, losing to Tommy Robredo.

Representing his country at the 2008 Summer Olympics in Beijing, Berdych advanced to the third round before being defeated by Roger Federer in their second meeting at an Olympics tennis tournament. He also had a bad run in North America, as he suffered early losses and a first-round loss in the 2008 US Open to Sam Querrey. He then made it to the semifinals of the 2008 Thailand Open, losing to Novak Djokovic. He then won his only title of the year in the 2008 AIG Japan Open Tennis Championships, with wins over four top-20 players: Tommy Robredo, Fernando González, Andy Roddick, and Juan Martín del Potro in the finals.

=== 2009: Fifth title, Davis Cup final ===
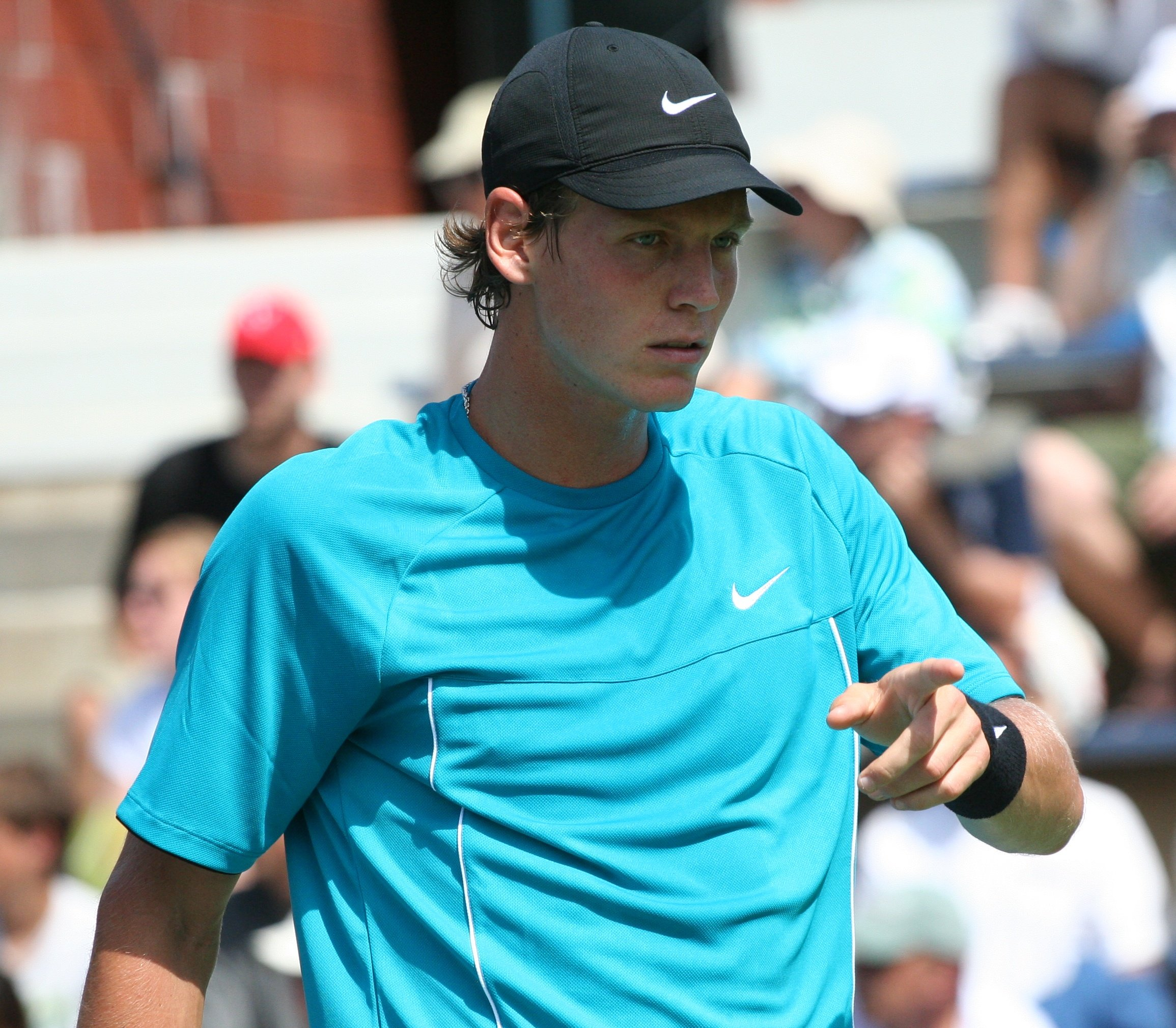
Berdych during the 2009 season

Berdych's season did not have a good start, as he had a 2–6 record, excluding the 2009 Australian Open, where he advanced to the fourth round to face Roger Federer. Berdych took two sets to love to lead over Federer but ended by being defeated in a tough five-setter. He then competed in the Challenger in 2010 BMW Tennis Championship, where he lost to Robin Söderling in the final. He then reached the fourth round of the 2009 Sony Ericsson Open, losing to Novak Djokovic after upsetting James Blake.

In the clay season, Berdych did not do well except for the 2009 French Open and the Masters as he lost in the first two rounds in all four events. He then reached the round of 16 at the 2009 Barcelona Open Banco Sabadell, losing to Fernando Verdasco and he won his only title of the year and the only time he reached a result better than the quarterfinals in the 2009 BMW Open, defeating Mikhail Youzhny. In the 2009 Gerry Weber Open, he lost to Mischa Zverev and at Wimbledon, he lost to eventual finalist Andy Roddick in straight sets. He then lost in the first rounds of Stuttgart and the Rogers Masters, but reached the quarterfinals of 2009 Legg Mason Tennis Classic, losing to John Isner and 2009 Western & Southern Financial Group Masters, losing to Rafael Nadal.

In the US Open, he reached the round of 32, losing to Fernando González. He then reached the quarterfinals of the 2009 Proton Malaysian Open and the 2009 Rakuten Japan Open Tennis Championships. He then suffered back-to-back losses to Gilles Simon at the 2009 Shanghai ATP Masters 1000 and the 2009 Valencia Open 500. He then reached the second round in Paris, losing to Tommy Robredo.

In the Davis Cup first-round tie against France, he won the opening match, defeating top-ranked Frenchman Gilles Simon and joined Radek Štěpánek to beat French duo Richard Gasquet and Michaël Llodra. He later helped his country to reach the Davis Cup final against Spain, after winning the semifinal tie 3–2 against Croatia. The tie ended 5–0 in favor of the defending champions, with Berdych losing to Nadal in the first rubber.

=== 2010: Grand Slam final in Wimbledon, French Open semi-final ===
Berdych began the year at the 2010 Brisbane International, where he reached the semifinals, before losing to eventual champion Andy Roddick. He then suffered second-round upsets at the 2010 Medibank International Sydney to Peter Luczak and the 2010 Australian Open to Evgeny Korolev. He then recorded three straight quarterfinals in the 2010 SAP Open, again losing to Andy Roddick, at the 2010 Regions Morgan Keegan Championships upset by Ernests Gulbis, and the first Masters of the year at the 2010 BNP Paribas Open to Rafael Nadal after upsetting Fernando Verdasco.

In the 2010 Sony Ericsson Open, he stunned an error-filled top seed Roger Federer in three sets in the round of 16, after saving a match point. This was his second victory over Roger and ended an eight straight losing streak to the Swiss. He then went on to defeat Spaniard Fernando Verdasco and overpowered Robin Söderling, but lost in the final to Roddick in straight sets.

He began his clay season at the 2010 Monte-Carlo Rolex Masters, losing to eventual finalist Fernando Verdasco, in the third round, after cruising through the first two rounds. At the 2010 Internazionali BNL d'Italia, he lost to Stanislas Wawrinka on a final set tie break. At the 2010 BMW Open, he was upset by Philipp Petzschner in the quarterfinals. He then withdrew from the 2010 Mutua Madrileña Madrid Open due to a right hip injury. He then represented Czech Republic at the 2010 ARAG World Team Cup and won all his three singles matches, but failed to reach the final after losing the tie against USA. In the 2010 French Open, Berdych enjoyed his best performance to date in a Grand Slam tournament. He reached the semifinals, where he was defeated by fifth seed Robin Söderling in five sets. En route to the semifinals, he defeated three seeded opponents in straight sets: John Isner in the third round, No. 4 Andy Murray in the fourth round, and Mikhail Youzhny in the quarterfinals.

He reached his first career slam final at Wimbledon after beating Andrey Golubev and Benjamin Becker in straight sets, Denis Istomin in five, and Daniel Brands in four sets. He also defeated defending champion Roger Federer in four sets to record his second straight victory over the Swiss. The win also made him only the fourth Czech-born man to reach the semifinals at Wimbledon, after Jaroslav Drobný, Jan Kodeš, and Ivan Lendl. In the semifinal match against Novak Djokovic, Berdych won in straight sets to reach his first Grand Slam final, against No. 1 Rafael Nadal. There, he lost to the Spaniard in straight sets.

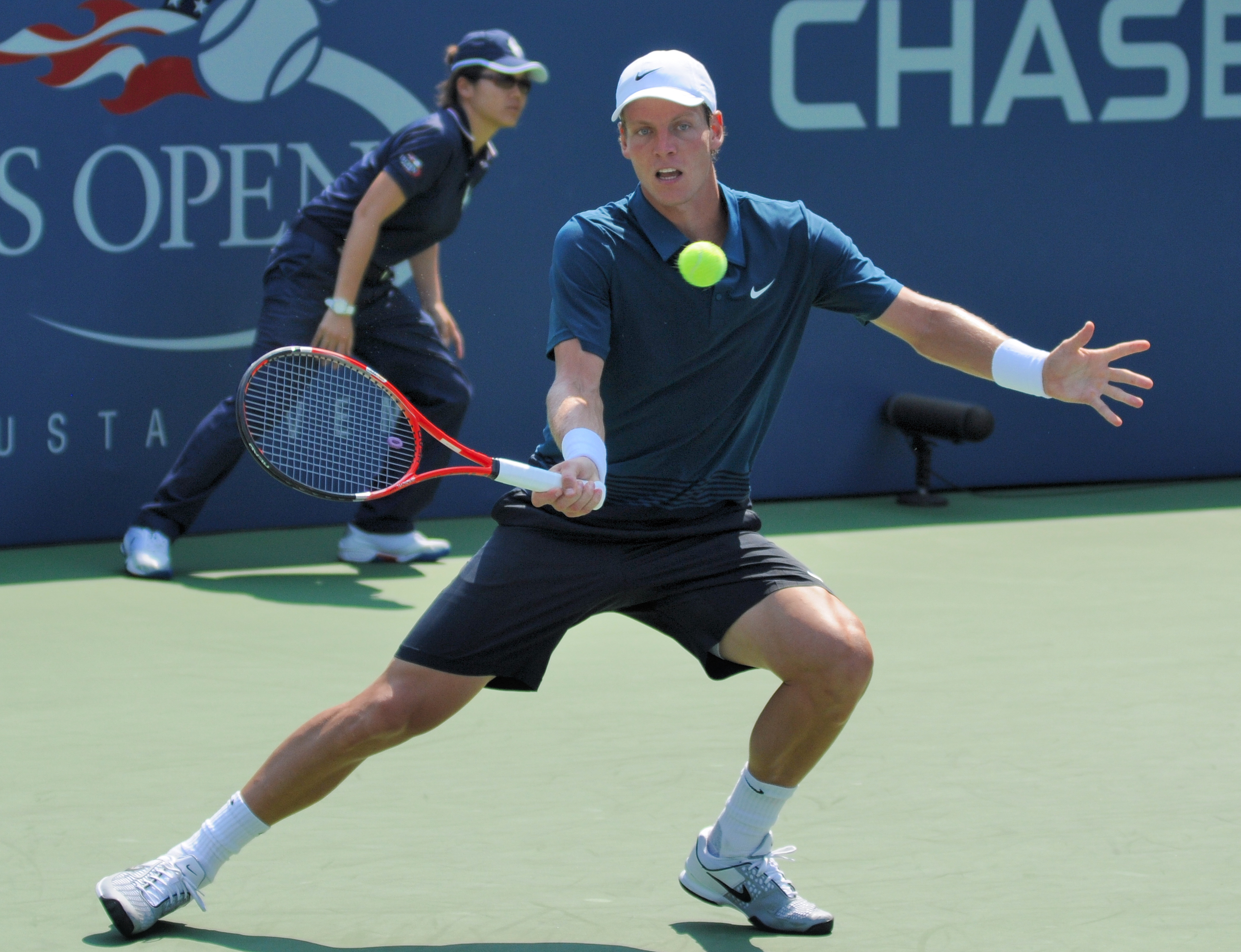
Berdych at the US Open

Afterwards, he played at the 2010 Legg Mason Tennis Classic in Washington as the top seed. He made the quarterfinals, after beating both Dmitry Tursunov and Andrey Golubev in three sets en route. However, he lost to Xavier Malisse in three sets in the quarterfinals. At the 2010 Rogers Cup in Toronto, he beat two Ukrainian players, Sergiy Stakhovsky (in the opening round) and Alexandr Dolgopolov (in the third round) to reach the quarterfinals. There, he lost to Roger Federer, despite serving for the match at 5–3 in the third set while being two points away from victory numerous times. At the 2010 US Open as the seventh seed, Berdych was upset in the first round by Michaël Llodra in straight sets.

Appearing at the 2010 Proton Malaysian Open in Kuala Lumpur, he made the quarterfinals, where he lost to David Ferrer. Berdych then made a first-round exit at the 2010 China Open, where he lost to Michael Berrer. At the 2010 Shanghai Rolex Masters, Berdych lost to Guillermo García López in the third round. He then suffered two successive opening-round losses, first at the 2010 If Stockholm Open in Stockholm (Sweden) falling to Jarkko Nieminen and at the 2010 Davidoff Swiss Indoors in Basel (Switzerland), losing to Tobias Kamke.

At the 2010 BNP Paribas Masters, Berdych lost to Nikolay Davydenko in the third round. Berdych qualified for the Barclays ATP World Tour Finals, where he made his first appearance at the year-end championships. He was sixth seed at the 2010 ATP World Tour Finals. In his opening round-robin match he lost to Novak Djokovic in straight sets. However, Berdych defeated Andy Roddick in the second round-robin match in straight sets. In his last round-robin match, Berdych was defeated by Rafael Nadal in two sets, which meant that he could not advance to the semifinals.

=== 2011: Sixth title, World Tour Finals semi-final ===
Berdych began the year at the 2011 Aircel Chennai Open, where he reached the semifinals, before losing to Stanislas Wawrinka. At the 2011 Australian Open, Berdych advanced to the quarterfinals, where he was defeated by eventual champion Novak Djokovic in straight sets. He then recorded two straight quarterfinals and a semifinal in the 2011 ABN AMRO World Tennis Tournament, pulling out against Jo-Wilfried Tsonga citing injury, at the 2011 Open 13 falling to Marin Čilić and at the 2011 Dubai Tennis Championships, retiring with a thigh injury against Novak Djokovic.

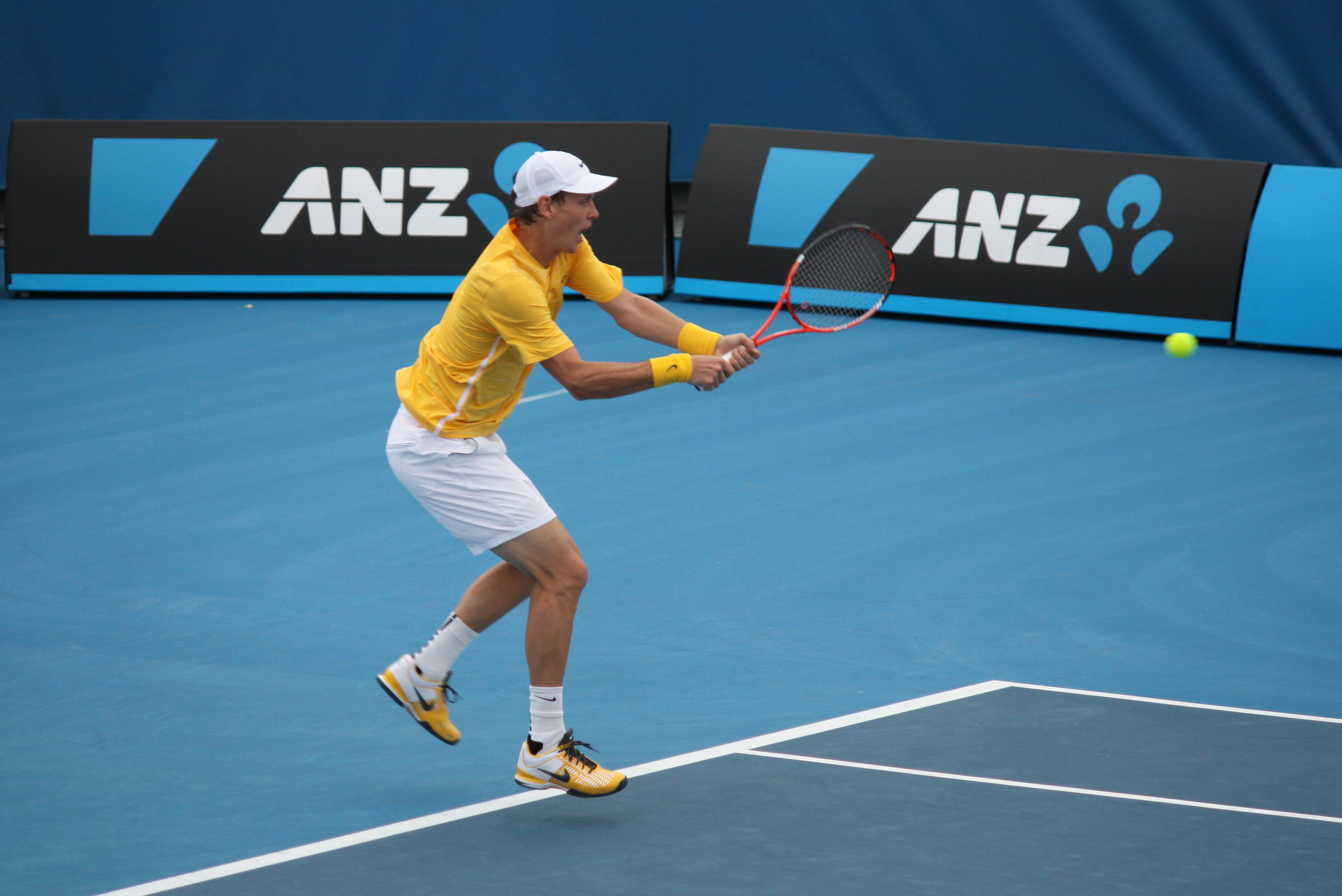
Berdych at the 2011 Australian Open

At the 2011 Davis Cup World Group, the Czech Republic were defeated by Kazakhstan 2–3 meaning that the Czechs would have to go through the play-offs. Berdych won his first singles rubber against Mikhail Kukushkin and in the doubles, Berdych and his partner, Lukáš Dlouhý, defeated Evgeny Korolev and Yuri Schukin. In his second rubber, Berdych was beaten by Andrey Golubev.

In the 2011 Sony Ericsson Open, Berdych reached the round of 16, after defeating Rubén Ramírez Hidalgo, Carlos Berlocq, and Florian Mayer, before falling to eventual finalist Rafael Nadal.

He began his clay season at the 2011 Monte-Carlo Rolex Masters, losing in the round of 16 to Ivan Ljubičić in straight sets. At the 2011 Mutua Madrid Open, Berdych reached the quarterfinals, before losing to Thomaz Bellucci. At the 2011 Internazionali BNL d'Italia, he reached the quarterfinals, before falling to Richard Gasquet. At the 2011 Open de Nice Côte d'Azur, Berdych reached his first semifinal of the clay season, before losing to eventual champion Nicolás Almagro in straight sets. At the 2011 French Open, Berdych was seeded sixth. In the first round, Berdych suffered a shocking loss to Stéphane Robert in five sets.

In preparation for Wimbledon, Berdych played in the 2011 Gerry Weber Open held in Halle, Germany. In the first round, Berdych defeated Ruben Bemelmans after saving three match points. He then defeated Jan Hernych and Viktor Troicki in the second round and quarterfinals respectively, both in straight sets. In the semifinals, he lost to Philipp Petzschner in three sets. At the 2011 Wimbledon Championships, Berdych won his first, second, and third-round matches in straight sets against Filippo Volandri, Julien Benneteau, and Alex Bogomolov Jr. respectively. In the fourth round, Berdych suffered a straight-set loss to Mardy Fish.

His next tournament was the 2011 Swedish Open, where he reached the semis, losing to Robin Söderling in straight sets.

Berdych kicked off his US Open Series at the 2011 Rogers Cup. He beat Alexandr Dolgopolov. From that match onward, Berdych changed his racket to the Head YouTek™ IG Instinct MP. In the Round of 16, Berdych defeated Ivo Karlović. In the quarterfinals, Berdych fell to Janko Tipsarević.

Berdych competed in the 2011 Western & Southern Open held in Cincinnati, United States. In the quarterfinals, he stunned the two-time defending champion, Roger Federer in straight sets. In the semifinals, Berdych faced No. 1 Novak Djokovic. Berdych retired after losing the first set, citing injury to the right shoulder.

The next tournament Berdych played in was the 2011 US Open. Berdych defeated Romain Jouan and Fabio Fognini, but in the third round, Berdych retired against 20th seed, Janko Tipsarević, after re-aggravating the shoulder injury he suffered at the 2011 Western & Southern Open.

Berdych played with the Czech Republic Davis Cup team against Romania in the 2011 Davis Cup World Group play-offs. In his singles rubber, Berdych defeated Victor Crivoi in straight sets. Berdych then teamed up with Radek Štěpánek in the doubles rubber, and they defeated Marius Copil and Horia Tecău. Štěpánek also won his singles rubber to guarantee the Czech Republic a spot in the 2012 Davis Cup World Group.

After pulling out of the 2011 Proton Malaysian Open due to a recurring shoulder injury, Berdych competed at the 2011 China Open, beating Jürgen Melzer and Philipp Kohlschreiber, both in straight sets. In the quarterfinals, Berdych dominated against Fernando Verdasco, thrashing him 6–1, 6–0. Berdych reached his first final since the 2010 Wimbledon Championships after a hard-fought victory over top seed, Jo-Wilfried Tsonga. Berdych won his sixth title of his career and his first title since the 2009 BMW Open, after defeating Marin Čilić in the final in three sets.

Berdych's next tournament was the 2011 Shanghai Rolex Masters, where he beat defeating compatriot Radek Štěpánek, before falling to Feliciano López in straight sets. Berdych next played at the 2011 Swiss Indoors Basel. He lost in the first round to eventual finalist Kei Nishikori.

Berdych then competed at the 2011 BNP Paribas Masters held in Paris, France, the final ATP World Tour Masters 1000 tournament of the season. Berdych defeated Fernando Verdasco. In the third round, Berdych defeated Janko Tipsarević and qualified for the 2011 ATP World Tour Finals. This was Berdych's second consecutive year to qualify for the ATP World Tour Finals. In the quarterfinals, Berdych shocked the 2nd seed, Andy Murray 4–6, 7–6, 6–4, ending the Scotsman's 17-match winning streak. In the semifinal, Berdych lost to Roger Federer.

Berdych's final tournament of the 2011 season was the 2011 ATP World Tour Finals. He came into the year-end championships as the 7th seed and was placed in Group A along with Novak Djokovic, Andy Murray (Later replaced by Janko Tipsarević), and David Ferrer. Berdych lost to top seed, Novak Djokovic after he squandered match point at 5–4 in the final set. In the second tie, Berdych was meant to face Andy Murray, but he was replaced by the alternate, Janko Tipsarević, after Murray pulled out of the tournament with a groin injury. Berdych came back from a set down and held match point in the final set tie-breaker, but he eventually won. In the final tie of the group stages, Berdych faced the 5th seed, David Ferrer. Berdych again came back from a set down to defeat Ferrer. This victory meant that Berdych won his group and he qualified for the semifinals for the first time in his career. In the semifinals, Berdych fell to the 6th seed, Jo-Wilfried Tsonga in straight sets. Berdych ended the season ranked 7th.

=== 2012: Hopman Cup & Davis Cup champion, US Open semi-final ===
Berdych started the 2012 season winning the 2012 Hopman Cup for the Czech Republic with compatriot Petra Kvitová. They were seeded first and won all their ties. Berdych finished the tournament with a 4–0 singles record, defeating Grigor Dimitrov, Mardy Fish and Frederik Nielsen in the group stages. In the final, Berdych and Kvitová both won their singles ties against France, with Berdych defeating Richard Gasquet.

At the 2012 AAMI Classic, Berdych lost to Bernard Tomic and Andy Roddick At the 2012 Australian Open, Berdych reached the quarterfinals after winning against Nicolás Almagro in the fourth round. The match was marred by controversy, as Berdych refused to shake Almagro's hand because he believed Almagro had intentionally aimed a shot at him during the match. Because of this, Berdych was booed whilst leaving the court. In the quarterfinals, Berdych lost to second seed Rafael Nadal in four sets after winning the first set.

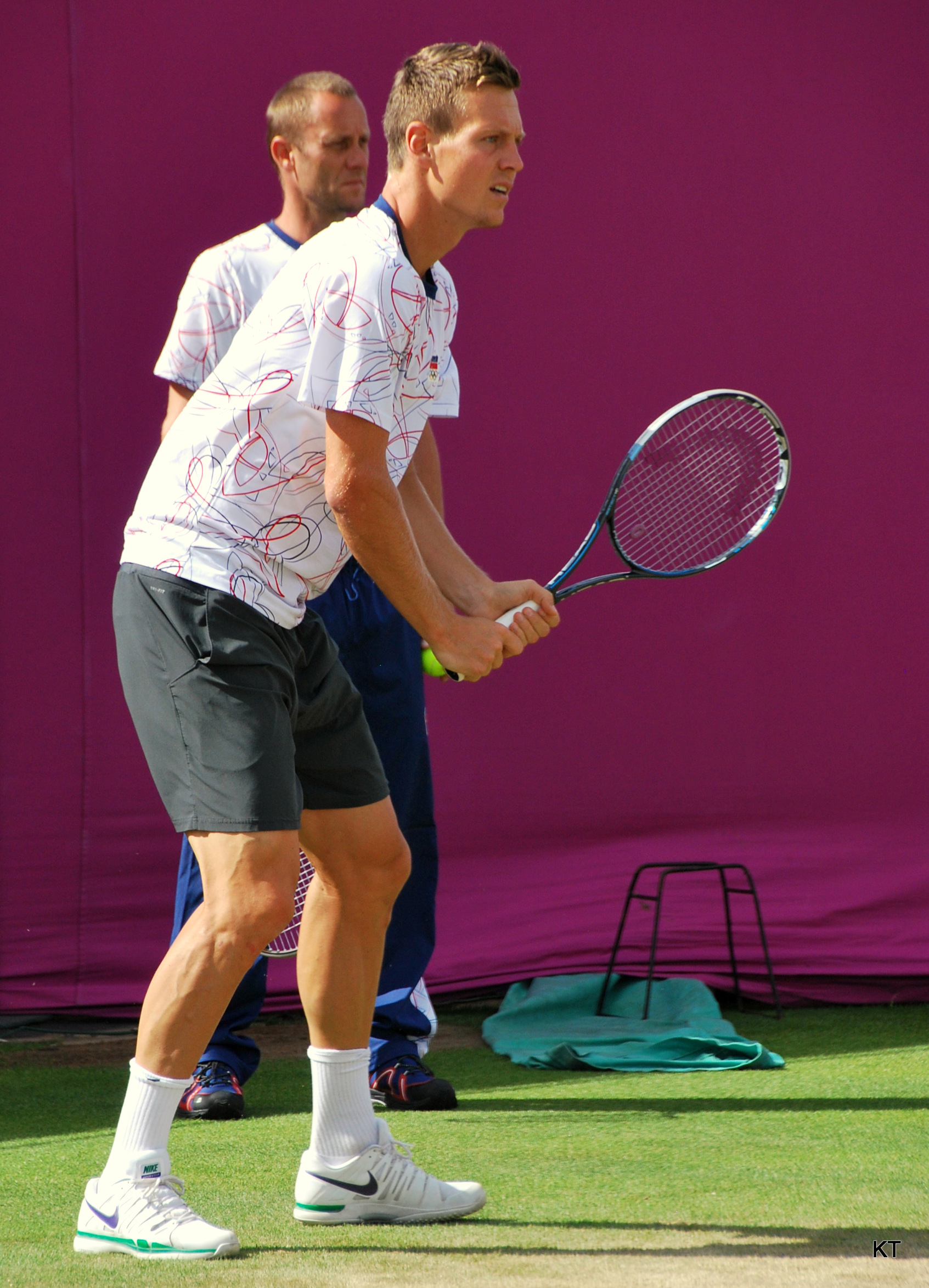
Berdych in 2012

Berdych won his first ATP tournament of 2012 at the 2012 Open Sud de France, defeating Gaël Monfils. This was Berdych's seventh career title and his fourth ATP World Tour 250 series title. This was followed by his reaching the semifinals at the 2012 ABN AMRO World Tennis Tournament, before falling to Juan Martín del Potro. At the 2012 BNP Paribas Open he beat Sergiy Stakhovsky and Andy Roddick, but then lost to Almagro. This was followed by another upset in the third round of the 2012 Sony Ericsson Open, losing to Grigor Dimitrov.

Berdych began his clay-court season at the 2012 Monte-Carlo Rolex Masters, where he reached the semifinals after upsetting third seed Andy Murray in the quarterfinals. He was defeated by No. 1 Novak Djokovic in the semifinals. Berdych competed at the 2012 Mutua Madrid Open and had straight-set victories over Kevin Anderson and Gaël Monfils. He thrashed Fernando Verdasco in the quarterfinals and beat Juan Martín del Potro for a place in the final. He was beaten by Roger Federer in three sets in the final. Federer led their head-to-head 11–4.

Berdych represented the Czech Republic at the 2012 Power Horse World Team Cup, where the Czechs reached the final before being defeated by Serbia. At the 2012 French Open, he was the seventh seed. He defeated Dudi Sela in the first round and Michaël Llodra in the second round, both in straight sets. In the third round, Berdych was pushed to five sets in a four-hour marathon against 31st seed Kevin Anderson, before he eventually prevailed. Berdych lost to Juan Martín del Potro in the fourth round in four sets. Berdych endured a tough spell in the summer, losing in the first round at both Wimbledon and the 2012 Summer Olympics.

He made the final of the 2012 Winston-Salem Open the week before the US Open, losing to John Isner in three sets, with a tie-break in the third set that went to 11–9. At the US Open, upon beating Nicolás Almagro in straight sets (his 200th career hard-court victory), Berdych made it past the fourth round of the US Open for the first time. He became only the third man from his country (after Ivan Lendl and Petr Korda) to reach the quarterfinal stage at all four Grand Slams. In the quarterfinals he upset top seed Roger Federer in four sets. He lost to Andy Murray in his first US Open semi-final in four sets. He took his 2nd singles title of the year in Stockholm Indoor, defeating Tsonga in the finals. At the 2012 ATP World Tour Finals he lost his first match against reigning US Open champion Andy Murray before beating Tsonga in his second match. In his last round robin match he lost to Novak Djokovic meaning he was unable to qualify for the semifinals. He ended the year participating in the 2012 Davis Cup Final playing in both singles and doubles and winning two matches as the Czech Republic won against Spain.

=== 2013: Longest doubles match ever, second Davis Cup title ===
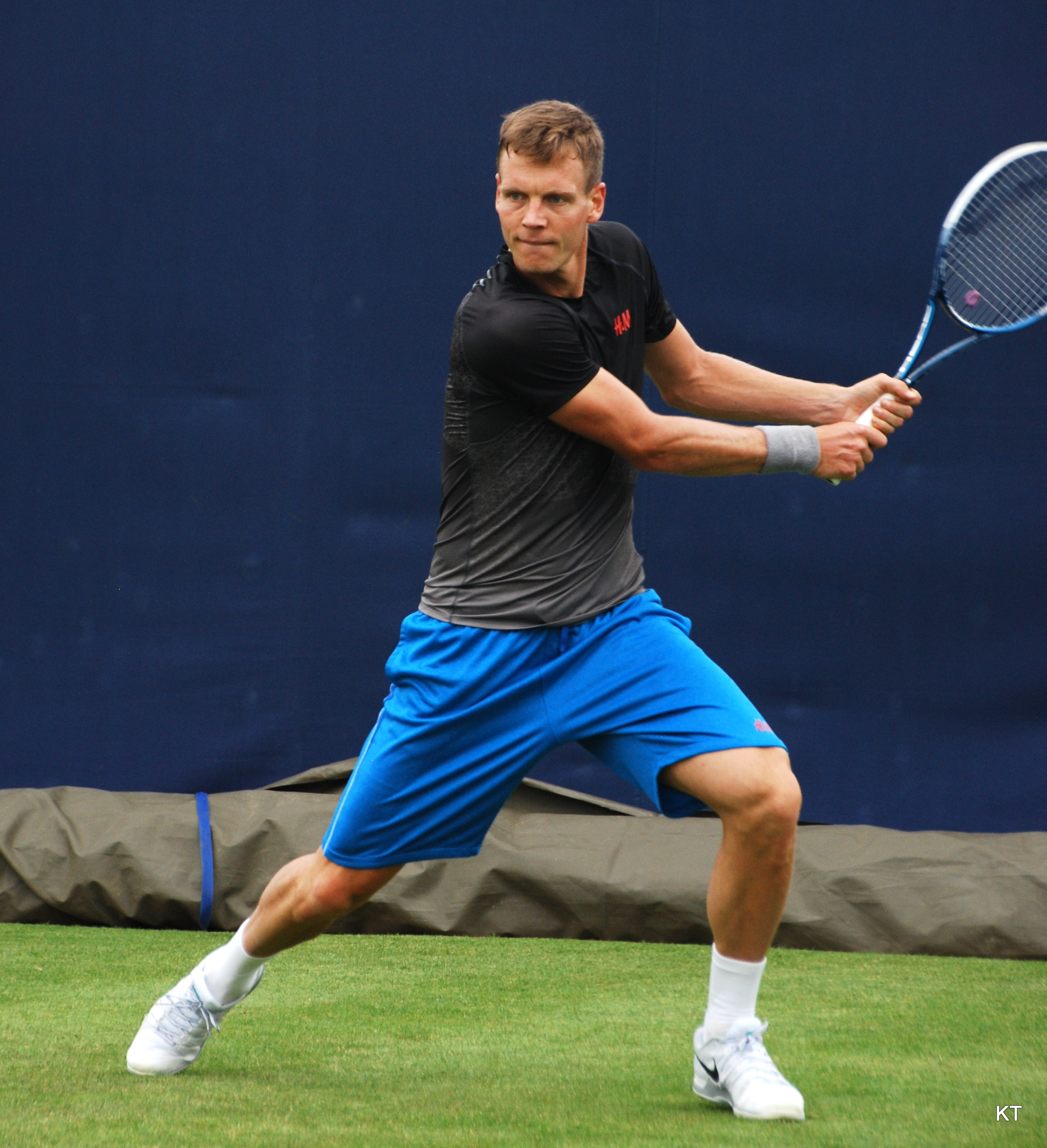
Tomáš Berdych at Queens

In 2013 Berdych signed a clothing sponsorship deal with H&M, replacing Nike. He reached his third consecutive quarterfinal at the 2013 Australian Open before falling to eventual champion Novak Djokovic. He then participated in the 2013 Davis Cup and he teamed up with Rosol in Davis Cup doubles against Switzerland playing the second longest ever ATP match. He then made back-to-back finals at the Open 13 and at the Dubai Tennis Championships losing to Jo-Wilfried Tsonga in three sets despite having match point and to Novak Djokovic in straight sets, respectively. And then he made a semifinal showing at the BNP Paribas Open losing to Rafael Nadal. At the Sony Open Tennis, he was upset by Richard Gasquet in the quarterfinals.

In the clay season, Berdych back to back semifinals of Masters 1000 events at the Mutua Madrid Open losing to Stanislas Wawrinka in three after defeating Andy Murray in the quarterfinals and the Internazionali BNL d'Italia defeating Novak Djokovic for just the second time in 13 meeting before losing to Nadal in straight sets. However, at the French Open, He lost in the first round to Gaël Monfils, in a long five set match, 5–7 in the fifth set. At the Queen's club championship, Berdych joined forces with Ivan Lendl in a charity doubles match against Andy Murray and Tim Henman, which they eventually lost 6–4. Berdych then went on to play Wimbledon, where he reached the quarterfinals before losing to eventual runner-up Novak Djokovic.

At the Rogers Cup, Berdych was defeated by Canadian Vasek Pospisil in the third round. However, Berdych bounced back at the Western & Southern Open, pulling off an upset in the quarterfinals by defeating Andy Murray but lost in the semifinals to Rafael Nadal. At the US Open he made it to the fourth round before being defeated by Stanislas Wawrinka. He reached his third final at the PTT Thailand Open falling to Canadian Milos Raonic in two tight sets. Berdych qualified for the fourth straight year for the ATP World Tour Finals, where he scored a win against David Ferrer in straight sets, but lost against Rafael Nadal and Stanislas Wawrinka, both in three sets.

=== 2014: Australian Open semi-final, two titles ===
Berdych reached his first Australian Open semi-final. In the semifinal, he lost to Stanislas Wawrinka in four sets. Berdych defeated a red-hot Marin Čilić to secure the ABN-AMBRO championship in Rotterdam. With this victory, he returns to his highest career ranking, #5. Berdych lost to Roberto Bautista Agut in the second round of the 2014 Indian Wells Masters. Although he entered the 2014 Sony Open Tennis ranked No. 7, Berdych reclaimed his career high ranking of No. 5 at the conclusion of the tournament, after withdrawing before his semifinal match with Rafael Nadal due to gastroenteritis. He was defeated by in-form Guillermo García López in the third round of the 2014 Monte-Carlo Rolex Masters. Berdych reached the quarterfinals of the French Open, most notably beating John Isner in the fourth round before losing in straight sets to in-form Ernests Gulbis.

Berdych struggled in the grass court season; he lost to eventual finalist Feliciano López in the quarterfinals of the 2014 Aegon Championships. He reaches the third round of 2014 Wimbledon Championships before falling to Marin Čilić in straight sets.

At the 2014 US Open Berdych reached the quarterfinals where he lost to eventual champion Marin Čilić in straight sets. His results continue to improve after US Open. He made two finals of the 2014 China Open (tennis) losing to Novak Djokovic. He made to the quarterfinals of the 2014 Shanghai Rolex Masters. In the quarterfinals, he lost to eventual finalist Gilles Simon. Berdych clinches the 2014 If Stockholm Open title by defeating defending champion Grigor Dimitrov in the final.

In December, Berdych announced that he had parted ways with his coach of six years Tomáš Krupa and fitness trainer David Vydra. Daniel Vallverdu was appointed as Berdych's coach for the 2015 season. Azuz Simcich became his new fitness coach.

=== 2015: Second Australian Open semi-final, No. 4 ranking ===
Berdych started his season at the Qatar Open in Doha, reaching the final against David Ferrer, losing in two sets. In Melbourne, Berdych reached his second Australian Open semifinal, after defeating Rafael Nadal in the quarterfinals. Berdych lost in four sets against Andy Murray in the semifinal. On 15 February 2015, he lost to Stan Wawrinka in three sets at the ABN AMRO World Tennis Tournament and therefore was not able to defend his title from the previous year. In the Miami Open, Berdych reached the semifinals, but lost to Andy Murray. This equalised his head-to-head score with Murray at 6–6. Berdych then participated in the Monte Carlo Masters, in which he defeated Gaël Monfils and Milos Raonic to reach the final, but eventually lost to Novak Djokovic. At the 2015 Mutua Madrid Open, Berdych lost in the semifinals to Rafael Nadal, but moved up two spots to 5th in the rankings. Following a quarterfinal appearance, the next week at the Rome Masters, Berdych reached a career-best No. 4 in the world rankings on 18 May. Berdych next competed at the French Open where he started his campaign with a straight-sets victory over young Japanese star Yoshihito Nishioka. Berdych followed this by defeating Radek Stepanek and Benoit Paire in the second and third rounds respectively to reach the fourth round. However, in the fourth round, Jo-Wilfried Tsonga defeated Berdych to end Berdych's French Open campaign. Berdych next competed at the Gerry Weber Open where he reached the quarterfinals before losing to Ivo Karlovic in three sets.

Berdych reached the fourth round of the Wimbledon Championships before losing to Gilles Simon in straight sets. Berdych lost in the second round of the Canada Masters and the quarterfinals in the Cincinnati Masters. Berdych then went on to reach the fourth round of the US Open before losing to Richard Gasquet in four sets after taking the first set. He followed with a title win at the Shenzhen Open, his 11th ATP World Tour title, defeating Guillermo García López in the final in straight sets. However, he could not carry his good form to the China Open as he lost in the first round to Pablo Cuevas. However, he made it to the quarterfinals in the Shanghai Masters event. Berdych then went on to win the Stockholm Open title and his 12th ATP World Tour title defeating Jack Sock in the final in straight sets while also winning the Stockholm title for the second straight year in a row and third title overall there. Berdych made it to the quarterfinals of the Paris Masters. He then qualified for the ATP World Tour Finals for the sixth year in a row. However, he lost all of his round robin matches to Roger Federer, Novak Djokovic, and Kei Nishikori. Berdych finished the year ranked No. 6.

=== 2016: Second Wimbledon semi-final ===
Berdych started 2016 ranked No. 6 and competed at the Qatar Open in Doha. He lost in the semifinals to Novak Djokovic in straight sets. Berdych next competed at the Australian Open where he was seeded 6th. He started his campaign by winning in straight sets in the first two rounds. He then defeated Nick Kyrgios in four sets in the third round and Roberto Bautista Agut in a close five setter in the fourth round. However, Berdych's campaign ended in the quarterfinals where he lost to Roger Federer in straight sets thus failing to reach the semifinals at the Australian Open for the first time since 2013. As a result of not defending his Australian Open semi-final, Berdych's ranking went down from No. 6 to No. 8. Berdych then took his campaign to Open 13 as the 2nd. He defeated Alexander Zverev in three sets and 6th seed David Goffin in straight sets to advance to the semifinals where he ended up losing to eventual champion Nick Kyrgios. He then played at the Dubai Tennis Championships as the 3rd seed, losing in the quarterfinals in straight sets to Nick Kyrgios. He then made the Round of 16 at Indian Wells (losing to Milos Raonic in straight sets) and the quarterfinals at Miami (losing to Novak Djokovic in straight sets).

Berdych's clay court season was quiet: losing in the second round in Monte-Carlo, the quarterfinals in Madrid (to finalist Andy Murray), and the third round in Rome (where he lost 0–6 0–6 to David Goffin). He did make the quarterfinals at Roland Garros, beating Pablo Cuevas and David Ferrer before losing in straight sets to eventual champion Novak Djokovic. At Wimbledon, Berdych made it to the semifinals for the first time since his run to the finals in 2010, beating Jiří Veselý in five sets in the round of 16 and Lucas Pouille in straight sets in the quarterfinals before losing in straight sets to eventual champion Andy Murray.

After a quarterfinal loss in Canada and a third round loss in Cincinnati, Berdych was forced to withdraw from the US Open due to appendicitis. This was the first Grand Slam Berdych had missed since his first slam appearance in 2003, ending a streak of 52 consecutive Grand Slam appearances. Berdych returned to action on the Asian swing, reaching the semifinals in St. Petersburg and winning the title in Shenzhen over Richard Gasquet before suffering early losses in Tokyo and Shanghai. His year concluded with a quarterfinal finish in Paris. Ending the year ranked 10th, Berdych did not qualify for the ATP World Tour Finals for the first time since 2010, ending a streak of six straight year-end championship appearances.

=== 2017: Third Wimbledon semi-final, injury struggles ===
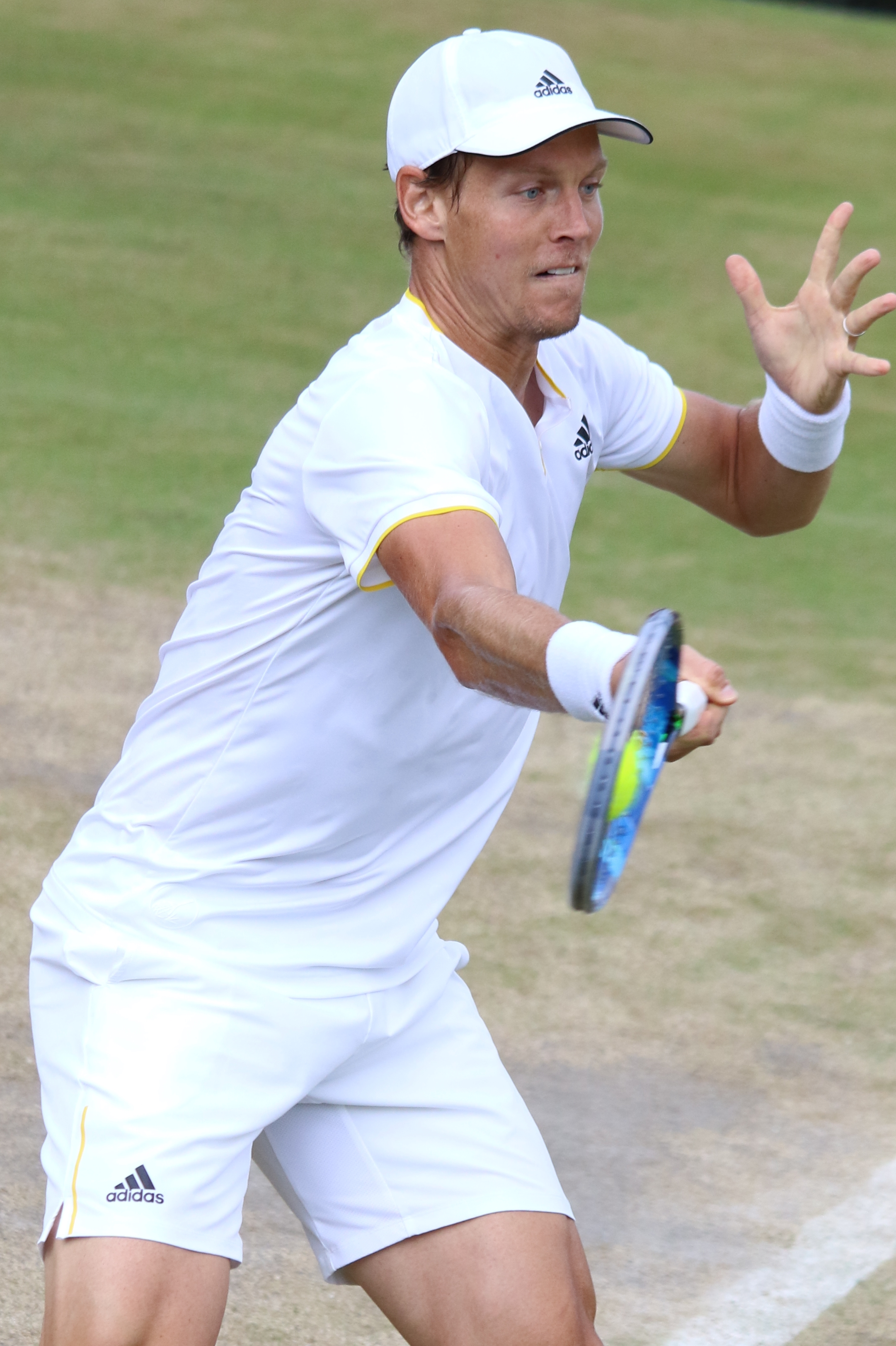
Berdych at the 2017 Wimbledon Championships

Berdych started 2017 ranked No. 10 and had a mixed year of highs and lows. He again reached the semifinals at Doha, losing again in straight sets, this time to Andy Murray. At the Australian Open his first opponent retired after the first set and Berdych went on to reach the round of 32, ultimately losing in straight sets to Roger Federer. Berdych reached the semifinals of the ABN Amro World Tennis Tournament in Rotterdam where he was defeated by Jo-Wilfried Tsonga in straight sets. At the Miami Open, Berdych reached the quarterfinals, taking Roger Federer to three sets but ultimately losing a tie-break. He reached the round of 16 at his next three tournaments in Monte Carlo, Madrid and Rome. Berdych played excellently at the first Lyon Open to be held since 2009, beating Gilles Simon and Milos Raonic on his way to the final, only to be beaten by Tsonga, all matches being straight sets. Conversely, Berdych was able to reach only the round of 64 at the 2017 French Open, where he lost to Russian Karen Khachanov.

On the up again, he reached the quarterfinals at both Stuttgart and London's Queen's Club, losing in each case to Feliciano López. Having seen off the likes of Dominic Thiem and Novak Djokovic in earlier rounds at Wimbledon, Berdych succumbed in the semifinal to a superb Roger Federer, who went on to win the Championship. At the US Open, he was able to reach only the round of 64, taking Alexandr Dolgopolov to four sets but no further. After playing for Team Europe in the inaugural Laver Cup, hosted in Berdych's home capital Prague, the Czech shut down his season early with a back injury after losing in the round of 16 at Beijing. Berdych finished the year ranked 19th, his first year-end ranking outside the top ten since 2009.

=== 2018: Back injury, out of top 50 ===
Berdych began his Australian swing playing at the Tie Break Tens exhibition tournament in Melbourne on the Wednesday before the Australian Open. Berdych beat Nick Kyrgios and Milos Raonic en route to the final where he defeated No. 1 Rafael Nadal 10–5. In winning, Berdych won $250,000 (Australian).

At the Australian Open 2018 he played in the first round beating rising Australian player Alex de Minaur in four sets to set up a match against Guillermo García López which Berdych won. In the third and fourth rounds Berdych beat Juan Martín del Potro and Fabio Fognini both in straight sets before losing in the quarterfinals to Roger Federer.

Berdych beat Maximilian Marterer in the second round at the BNP Paribas Open in Indian Wells, but was defeated in straight sets by Hyeon Chung in the third round. The Czech had a terrible clay court season, losing his opening matches in Monte-Carlo, Madrid and Rome. At the French Open, he lost in the first round to Jérémy Chardy in five sets. He then withdrew from Wimbledon due to a back injury and missed the rest of the season, finishing the year ranked 71.

=== 2019: Final season and retirement ===
Berdych returned from his injury hiatus at the Qatar ExxonMobil Open. He reached the final where he lost to seventh seed Roberto Bautista Agut in three sets. At the Australian Open, he made it to the fourth round where he was defeated by second seed Rafael Nadal.

In Montpellier, Berdych made it to the semifinals where he fell to seventh seed Pierre-Hugues Herbert. At the Rotterdam Open, he was eliminated in the second round by tenth seed Denis Shapovalov. At the Dubai Championships, he was beaten in his second-round match by sixth seed Borna Ćorić. After losing in the first round of the Indian Wells Masters to Feliciano López, he again missed time due to a back injury.

At Wimbledon, Berdych was defeated in the first round by Taylor Fritz.

In August, Berdych competed at the Winston-Salem Open. He was eliminated from the tournament in the second round by eighth seed Filip Krajinović. At the US Open, he lost in the first round to American qualifier Jenson Brooksby in the last match of his career.

On Saturday, November 16, 2019, Berdych announced his retirement from tennis at the Nitto ATP Finals.

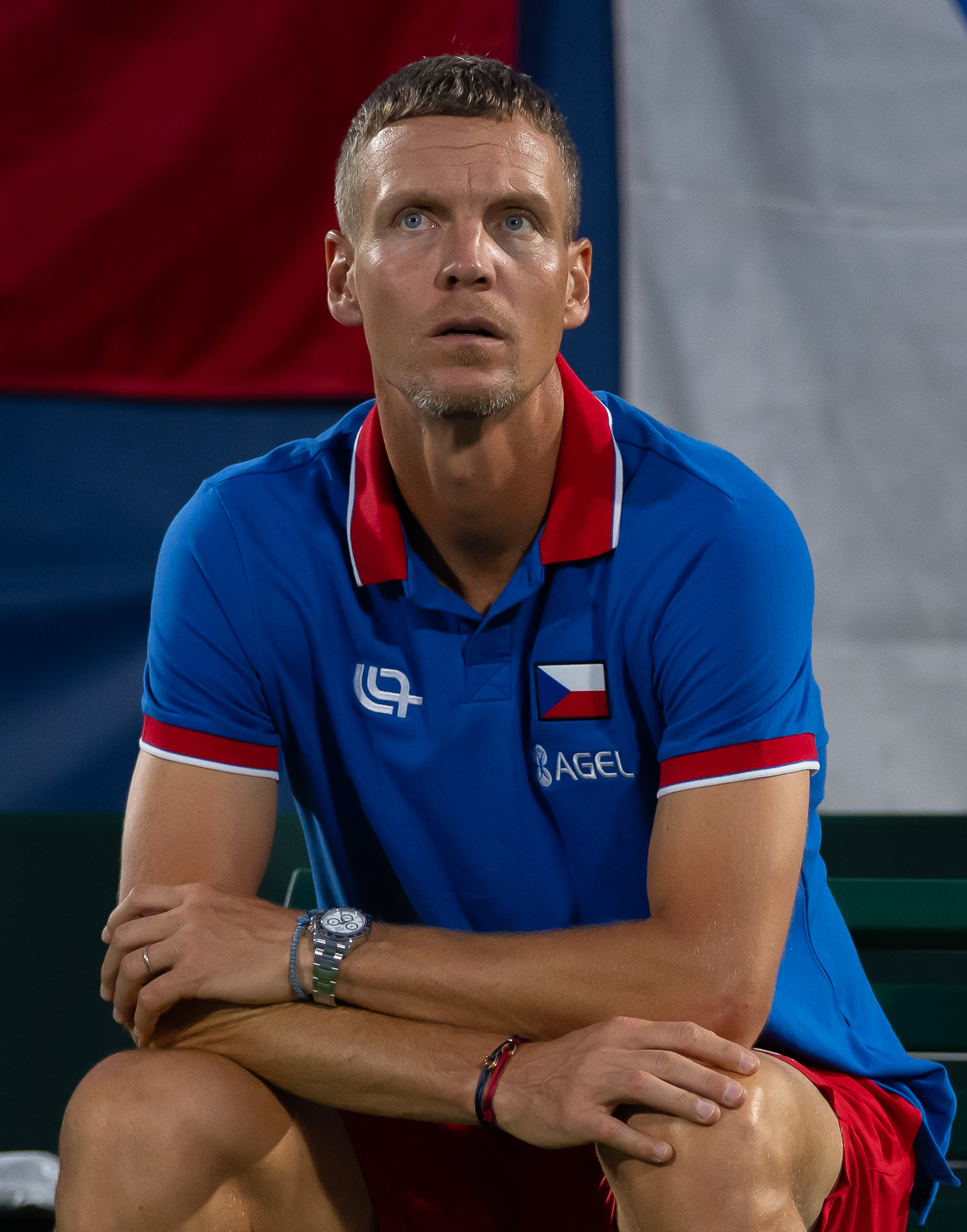
Berdych as captain of Davis Cup team in 2025

== Coaching career ==
On 15 September 2024, Berdych was named the Davis Cup captain for Czech Republic.

== Equipment and apparel ==
Berdych was sponsored by Head for his rackets and endorsed the Head Graphene Touch Instinct MP paintjob with a Pro Stock TGK260.2 Radical MP 16x19 underneath. He used both the Graphene XT Instinct MP and the Graphene Instinct MP paintjob from the 2013 season on. For the 2012 season, Berdych used the Head YouTek IG Instinct MP paintjob. From the start of 2010 through the end of the 2011 season, he used the Pro Stock Head YouTek Radical MP with a 16/19 string pattern. Before the 2010 season, he was sponsored by Dunlop Sport and used the Dunlop Aerogel 4D 200.

In January 2013, it was announced that Berdych had signed a partnership with Swedish fashion house H&M, after his contract with Nike ended earlier in the month. He acted as a spokesperson and co-designer for tennis wear for the brand. Berdych debuted his new clothing in the 2013 Miami Masters. In 2016, Berdych moved to Adidas and launched his first watch from Felio Siby.

In 2018, Berdych was announced as a brand ambassador for the Italian clothing company Hydrogen.

== Career statistics ==
=== Grand Slam singles performance timelines ===
Key
W	F	SF	QF	#R	RR	Q#	DNQ	A	NH

(W) winner; (F) finalist; (SF) semifinalist; (QF) quarterfinalist; (#R) rounds 4, 3, 2, 1; (RR) round-robin stage; (Q#) qualification round; (DNQ) did not qualify; (A) absent; (NH) not held; (SR) strike rate (events won / competed); (W–L) win–loss record.

Tournament	2003	2004	2005	2006	2007	2008	2009	2010	2011	2012	2013	2014	2015	2016	2017	2018	2019	SR	W–L	Win %
Australian Open	A	2R	1R	2R	4R	4R	4R	2R	QF	QF	QF	SF	SF	QF	3R	QF	4R	0 / 16	47–16	75%
French Open	A	1R	2R	4R	1R	2R	1R	SF	1R	4R	1R	QF	4R	QF	2R	1R	A	0 / 15	25–15	63%
Wimbledon	A	1R	3R	4R	QF	3R	4R	F	4R	1R	QF	3R	4R	SF	SF	A	1R	0 / 15	42–15	74%
US Open	2R	4R	3R	4R	4R	1R	3R	1R	3R	SF	4R	QF	4R	A	2R	A	1R	0 / 15	32–15	68%
Win–Loss	1–1	4–4	5–4	10–4	10–4	6–4	8–4	12–4	9–4	12–4	11–4	15–4	14–4	13–3	9–4	4–2	3–3	0 / 61	146–61	71%

=== Grand Slam tournament finals ===
==== Singles: 1 (runner-up) ====
Result	Year	Tournament	Surface	Opponent	Score
Loss	2010	Wimbledon	Grass	(Spain) Rafael Nadal	3–6, 5–7, 4–6
