= 2010 ITF Men's Circuit (July–September) =

The 2010 ITF Men's Circuit is the 2010 edition of the third-tier tour for men's professional tennis. It is organised by the International Tennis Federation and is a tier below the ATP Challenger Tour. During the months of July and September more than 179 tournaments were played with the majority being played in the month of August.

== Key ==
$15,000 tournaments
$10,000 tournaments

== July ==
Week of	Tournament	Winner	Runners-up	Semifinalists	Quarterfinalists
July 5	Austria F1 Futures; Telfs, Austria; Clay $15,000	(Serbia) Nikola Ćirić; 7–5, 6–1	(Russia) Andrey Kumantsov	(Austria) Johannes Ager (Austria) Marc Rath	(Switzerland) Robin Roshardt (Austria) Nicolas Reissig (Slovenia) Tomislav Ternar (France) Mathieu Rodrigues
July 5	Austria F1 Futures; Telfs, Austria; Clay $15,000	(Russia) Andrey Kumantsov (Serbia) David Savić; 6–3, 7–6^{(7–4)}	(Austria) Johannes Ager (Austria) Rainer Eitzinger	(Austria) Johannes Ager (Austria) Marc Rath	(Switzerland) Robin Roshardt (Austria) Nicolas Reissig (Slovenia) Tomislav Ternar (France) Mathieu Rodrigues
July 5	France F11 Futures; Bourg-en-Bresse, France; Clay $15,000+H	(France) Romain Jouan; 6–2, 6–7^{(5–7)}, 6–1	(Australia) James Lemke	(France) Florian Reynet (France) Baptiste Dupuy	(France) Jonathan Eysseric (France) Grégoire Burquier (France) Kenny de Schepper (France) Élie Rousset
July 5	France F11 Futures; Bourg-en-Bresse, France; Clay $15,000+H	(France) Jérôme Inzerillo (France) Romain Jouan; 7–5, 6–4	(France) Baptiste Dupuy (France) Clément Reix	(France) Florian Reynet (France) Baptiste Dupuy	(France) Jonathan Eysseric (France) Grégoire Burquier (France) Kenny de Schepper (France) Élie Rousset
July 5	Argentina F12 Futures; Resistencia, Argentina; Clay $10,000	(Argentina) Pablo Galdón; 6–2, 7–6^{(7–5)}	(Argentina) Joaquín-Jesús Monteferrario	(Italy) Stefano Travaglia (Argentina) Eduardo Peralta-Tello	(Argentina) Nicolás Pastor (Argentina) Juan Ignacio Londero (Argentina) José María Paniagua (Argentina) Alejandro Fabbri
July 5	Argentina F12 Futures; Resistencia, Argentina; Clay $10,000	(Argentina) Rodrigo Albano (Argentina) Marco Trungelliti; 7–6^{(7–1)}, 6–4	(Argentina) Nicolás Pastor (Argentina) Juan Manoel Romanazzi	(Italy) Stefano Travaglia (Argentina) Eduardo Peralta-Tello	(Argentina) Nicolás Pastor (Argentina) Juan Ignacio Londero (Argentina) José María Paniagua (Argentina) Alejandro Fabbri
July 5	Brazil F12 Futures; Sorocaba, Brazil; Clay $10,000	(Brazil) Caio Zampieri; 6–2, 5–7, 7–6^{(7–4)}	(Brazil) Rogério Dutra da Silva	(Argentina) Juan-Pablo Villar (Brazil) José Pereira	(Brazil) Eládio Ribeiro Neto (Brazil) Alexandre Bonatto (Brazil) Tiago Lopes (Brazil) Leonardo Kirche
July 5	Brazil F12 Futures; Sorocaba, Brazil; Clay $10,000	(Brazil) Alexandre Bonatto (Brazil) Rodrigo Guidolin; 1–6, 6–2, [11–9]	(Brazil) Rodrigo-Antonio Grilli (Brazil) Fernando Romboli	(Argentina) Juan-Pablo Villar (Brazil) José Pereira	(Brazil) Eládio Ribeiro Neto (Brazil) Alexandre Bonatto (Brazil) Tiago Lopes (Brazil) Leonardo Kirche
July 5	Germany F8 Futures; Römerberg, Germany; Clay $10,000	(Belgium) David Goffin; Walkover	(France) Éric Prodon	(Germany) Malte Stropp (Czech Republic) Roman Jebavý	(Czech Republic) Jiří Košler (Poland) Adam Chadaj (Slovakia) Michal Pažický (Germany) Patrick Taubert
July 5	Germany F8 Futures; Römerberg, Germany; Clay $10,000	(Germany) Marco Kirschner (Germany) Marko Lenz; 6–4, 6–7^{(5–7)}, [10–8]	(Czech Republic) Roman Jebavý (Czech Republic) Jiří Košler	(Germany) Malte Stropp (Czech Republic) Roman Jebavý	(Czech Republic) Jiří Košler (Poland) Adam Chadaj (Slovakia) Michal Pažický (Germany) Patrick Taubert
July 5	Great Britain F9 Futures; Ilkley, Great Britain; Grass $10,000	(United Kingdom) Josh Goodall; 6–3, 7–6^{(7–2)}	(United Kingdom) David Rice	(United Kingdom) Marcus Willis (United Kingdom) George Morgan	(United Kingdom) Daniel Evans (United Kingdom) Dominic Inglot (United Kingdom) Joshua Milton (Australia) Colin Ebelthite
July 5	Great Britain F9 Futures; Ilkley, Great Britain; Grass $10,000	(United Kingdom) Andrew Fitzpatrick (United Kingdom) Josh Goodall; 3–6, 7–5, [10–3]	(India) Divij Sharan (India) Vishnu Vardhan	(United Kingdom) Marcus Willis (United Kingdom) George Morgan	(United Kingdom) Daniel Evans (United Kingdom) Dominic Inglot (United Kingdom) Joshua Milton (Australia) Colin Ebelthite
July 5	Italy F16 Futures; Desenzano, Italy; Clay $10,000	(Russia) Mikhail Vasiliev; 6–4, 7–6^{(7–3)}	(Italy) Matteo Viola	(Italy) Andrea Stoppini (Italy) Stefano Ianni	(Austria) Herbert Wiltschnig (Italy) Giacomo Oradini (Italy) Marco Cecchinato (Italy) Luca Vanni
July 5	Italy F16 Futures; Desenzano, Italy; Clay $10,000	(Italy) Nicola Remedi (Italy) Andrea Stoppini; 5–7, 7–6^{(8–6)}, [10–8]	(Italy) Marco Sattanino (Italy) Marco Viola	(Italy) Andrea Stoppini (Italy) Stefano Ianni	(Austria) Herbert Wiltschnig (Italy) Giacomo Oradini (Italy) Marco Cecchinato (Italy) Luca Vanni
July 5	Romania F6 Futures; Cluj-Napoca, Romania; Clay $10,000	(Spain) Javier Martí; 7–6^{(7–5)}, 5–7, 6–1	(Romania) Răzvan Sabău	(Czech Republic) Jiří Školoudík (Romania) Victor Ioniță	(Ukraine) Artem Smirnov (Romania) Andrei Mlendea (Australia) Brendan Moore (Spain) Carlos Calderón-Rodríguez
July 5	Romania F6 Futures; Cluj-Napoca, Romania; Clay $10,000	(Italy) Federico Torresi (Italy) Giulio Torroni; 5–7, 7–6^{(7–3)}, [10–6]	(Romania) Victor-Mugurel Anagnastopol (Romania) Victor Ioniță	(Czech Republic) Jiří Školoudík (Romania) Victor Ioniță	(Ukraine) Artem Smirnov (Romania) Andrei Mlendea (Australia) Brendan Moore (Spain) Carlos Calderón-Rodríguez
July 5	Spain F24 Futures; Bakio, Spain; Hard $10,000	(France) Fabrice Martin; 6–3, 6–4	(Israel) Amir Weintraub	(Spain) Abraham González-Jiménez (France) Rudy Coco	(Italy) Erik Crepaldi (France) Alexis Musialek (Italy) Claudio Grassi (Germany) Richard Waite
July 5	Spain F24 Futures; Bakio, Spain; Hard $10,000	(France) Alexis Heugas (France) Alexis Musialek; 7–5, 4–6, [10–4]	(Spain) Abraham González-Jiménez (Italy) Claudio Grassi	(Spain) Abraham González-Jiménez (France) Rudy Coco	(Italy) Erik Crepaldi (France) Alexis Musialek (Italy) Claudio Grassi (Germany) Richard Waite
July 5	USA F17 Futures; Pittsburgh, United States; Clay $10,000	(United States) Adam El Mihdawy; 6–3, 7–6^{(8–6)}	(United States) Rhyne Williams	(United States) Denis Zivkovic (South Korea) Daniel Yoo	(United States) Jack Sock (United States) Andrea Collarini (United States) Marcus Fugate (United States) Greg Ouellette
July 5	USA F17 Futures; Pittsburgh, United States; Clay $10,000	(United States) Tennys Sandgren (United States) Rhyne Williams; 3–6, 6–3, [11–9]	(United States) Greg Ouellette (Canada) Vasek Pospisil	(United States) Denis Zivkovic (South Korea) Daniel Yoo	(United States) Jack Sock (United States) Andrea Collarini (United States) Marcus Fugate (United States) Greg Ouellette
July 12	Austria F2 Futures; Kramsach, Austria; Clay $15,000	(Austria) Johannes Ager; 6–2, 6–4	(Slovakia) Norbert Gombos	(Germany) Jan-Frederik Brunken (Italy) Andrea Arnaboldi	(Slovakia) Andrej Martin (France) Mathieu Rodrigues (Uzbekistan) Farrukh Dustov (Germany) Marcel Zimmermann
July 12	Austria F2 Futures; Kramsach, Austria; Clay $15,000	(Czech Republic) Petr Kovačka (Czech Republic) Marek Michalička; 6–1, 6–3	(Austria) Maximilian Neuchrist (Austria) Tristan-Samuel Weissborn	(Germany) Jan-Frederik Brunken (Italy) Andrea Arnaboldi	(Slovakia) Andrej Martin (France) Mathieu Rodrigues (Uzbekistan) Farrukh Dustov (Germany) Marcel Zimmermann
July 12	Estonia F1 Futures; Kuressaare, Estonia; Clay $15,000	(Spain) Pablo Santos; 7–6^{(7–5)}, 5–7, 6–3	(Spain) Íñigo Cervantes Huegun	(Latvia) Andis Juška (Russia) Aleksandr Lobkov	(Estonia) Jürgen Zopp (Ukraine) Aleksandr Agafonov (Finland) Harri Heliövaara (Sweden) Michael Ryderstedt
July 12	Estonia F1 Futures; Kuressaare, Estonia; Clay $15,000	(Latvia) Andis Juška (Latvia) Deniss Pavlovs; 7–5, 7–6^{(8–6)}	(Finland) Harri Heliövaara (Sweden) Michael Ryderstedt	(Latvia) Andis Juška (Russia) Aleksandr Lobkov	(Estonia) Jürgen Zopp (Ukraine) Aleksandr Agafonov (Finland) Harri Heliövaara (Sweden) Michael Ryderstedt
July 12	France F12 Futures; Saint-Gervais, France; Clay $15,000	(Canada) Philip Bester; 6–2, 2–6, 6–2	(France) Augustin Gensse	(France) Benoît Paire (France) Jérôme Inzerillo	(France) Baptiste Dupuy (France) Grégoire Burquier (France) Laurent Rochette (Italy) Andrea Falgheri
July 12	France F12 Futures; Saint-Gervais, France; Clay $15,000	(France) Jérôme Inzerillo (France) Romain Jouan; 2–6, 6–4, [10–7]	(Canada) Philip Bester (France) Laurent Rochette	(France) Benoît Paire (France) Jérôme Inzerillo	(France) Baptiste Dupuy (France) Grégoire Burquier (France) Laurent Rochette (Italy) Andrea Falgheri
July 12	Iran F1 Futures; Tehran, Iran; Clay $15,000	(Hungary) Attila Balázs; 6–2, 6–2	(Kuwait) Abdullah Maqdes	(India) Vijay Sundar Prashanth (China) Xu Junchao	(Greece) Paris Gemouchidis (Russia) Stanislav Vovk (Chinese Taipei) Huang Liang-chi (Hungary) György Balázs
July 12	Iran F1 Futures; Tehran, Iran; Clay $15,000	(Belarus) Pavel Katliarov (Russia) Stanislav Vovk; 6–4, 6–4	(China) Gao Peng (China) Gao Wan	(India) Vijay Sundar Prashanth (China) Xu Junchao	(Greece) Paris Gemouchidis (Russia) Stanislav Vovk (Chinese Taipei) Huang Liang-chi (Hungary) György Balázs
July 12	Italy F17 Futures; Fano, Italy; Clay $15,000+H	(Croatia) Nikola Mektić; 6–2, 6–0	(Italy) Stefano Ianni	(Austria) Max Raditschnigg (Portugal) João Sousa	(Slovenia) Blaž Rola (Italy) Francesco Aldi (Italy) Alberto Brizzi (United Kingdom) Alexander Slabinsky
July 12	Italy F17 Futures; Fano, Italy; Clay $15,000+H	(Italy) Claudio Grassi (Italy) Stefano Ianni; 6–3, 7–5	(Greece) Alexandros Jakupovic (Austria) Max Raditschnigg	(Austria) Max Raditschnigg (Portugal) João Sousa	(Slovenia) Blaž Rola (Italy) Francesco Aldi (Italy) Alberto Brizzi (United Kingdom) Alexander Slabinsky
July 12	Argentina F13 Futures; Corrientes, Argentina; Clay $10,000	(Argentina) Guido Pella; 3–6, 6–1, 6–2	(Argentina) Marco Trungelliti	(Argentina) Diego Sebastián Schwartzman (Argentina) Pablo Galdón	(Argentina) Lionel Noviski (Argentina) Agustín Picco (Argentina) Alejandro Fabbri (Italy) Stefano Travaglia
July 12	Argentina F13 Futures; Corrientes, Argentina; Clay $10,000	(Argentina) Pablo Galdón (Argentina) Joaquín-Jesús Monteferrario; 6–1, 6–0	(Argentina) Andrés Ceppo (Argentina) Agustín Picco	(Argentina) Diego Sebastián Schwartzman (Argentina) Pablo Galdón	(Argentina) Lionel Noviski (Argentina) Agustín Picco (Argentina) Alejandro Fabbri (Italy) Stefano Travaglia
July 12	Brazil F15 Futures; Guarulhos, Brazil; Clay $10,000	(Brazil) Marcelo Demoliner; 6–7^{(4–7)}, 6–4, 6–4	(Brazil) Daniel Dutra da Silva	(Brazil) Rodrigo Guidolin (Argentina) Juan-Pablo Villar	(Brazil) Alexandre Bonatto (Brazil) Fernando Romboli (Brazil) Danilo Ferraz (Brazil) Thales Turini
July 12	Brazil F15 Futures; Guarulhos, Brazil; Clay $10,000	(Brazil) Marcelo Demoliner (Brazil) Rodrigo Guidolin; 6–4, 6–3	(Brazil) Rafael Camilo (Brazil) Fabrício Neis	(Brazil) Rodrigo Guidolin (Argentina) Juan-Pablo Villar	(Brazil) Alexandre Bonatto (Brazil) Fernando Romboli (Brazil) Danilo Ferraz (Brazil) Thales Turini
July 12	Germany F9 Futures; Trier, Germany; Clay $10,000	(Bulgaria) Grigor Dimitrov; 4–6, 6–1, 6–4	(Belgium) David Goffin	(Czech Republic) Jakub Lustyk (Austria) Marco Mirnegg	(United States) Nikita Kryvonos (Germany) Kevin Krawietz (Belgium) Julien Dubail (Australia) James Lemke
July 12	Germany F9 Futures; Trier, Germany; Clay $10,000	(Belgium) Alexandre Folie (Belgium) David Goffin; 6–0, 6–7^{(4–7)}, [10–7]	(United States) Patrick Frandji (Australia) Michael Hole	(Czech Republic) Jakub Lustyk (Austria) Marco Mirnegg	(United States) Nikita Kryvonos (Germany) Kevin Krawietz (Belgium) Julien Dubail (Australia) James Lemke
July 12	Great Britain F10 Futures; Frinton, Great Britain; Grass $10,000	(United Kingdom) Daniel Cox; 7–6^{(7–5)}, 6–2	(United Kingdom) Josh Goodall	(Australia) Colin Ebelthite (India) Vishnu Vardhan	(United Kingdom) Sean Thornley (France) Rudy Coco (United Kingdom) Alexander Ward (United States) Blake Strode
July 12	Great Britain F10 Futures; Frinton, Great Britain; Grass $10,000	(United Kingdom) Tim Bradshaw (United States) James Ludlow; 6–4, 6–7^{(7–9)}, [10–7]	(United Kingdom) Chris Eaton (United Kingdom) Josh Goodall	(Australia) Colin Ebelthite (India) Vishnu Vardhan	(United Kingdom) Sean Thornley (France) Rudy Coco (United Kingdom) Alexander Ward (United States) Blake Strode
July 12	Romania F7 Futures; Iași, Romania; Clay $10,000	(France) Maxime Teixeira; 6–2, 6–3	(France) Gleb Sakharov	(Romania) Robert Coman (Italy) Federico Torresi	(Croatia) Dino Marcan (Russia) Mikhail Vasiliev (Romania) Răzvan Sabău (Croatia) Toni Androić
July 12	Romania F7 Futures; Iași, Romania; Clay $10,000	(Croatia) Marin Draganja (Croatia) Dino Marcan; 6–4, 6–3	(Romania) Andrei Mlendea (Russia) Mikhail Vasiliev	(Romania) Robert Coman (Italy) Federico Torresi	(Croatia) Dino Marcan (Russia) Mikhail Vasiliev (Romania) Răzvan Sabău (Croatia) Toni Androić
July 12	Spain F25 Futures; Elche, Spain; Clay $10,000	(Spain) Marcelo Palacios-Siegenthale; 6–3, 6–1	(Norway) Erling Tveit	(Spain) Juan Lizariturry (Spain) David Cañudas-Fernández	(Spain) David Estruch (Spain) Gerard Gallego-Bertran (Spain) Andoni Vivanco-Guzmán (Spain) César Ferrer-Victoria
July 12	Spain F25 Futures; Elche, Spain; Clay $10,000	(Spain) Carlos Calderón-Rodríguez (Spain) Marc Fornell; 6–4, 6–2	(Spain) Juan Beaus-Barquin (Spain) Juan José Leal-Gómez	(Spain) Juan Lizariturry (Spain) David Cañudas-Fernández	(Spain) David Estruch (Spain) Gerard Gallego-Bertran (Spain) Andoni Vivanco-Guzmán (Spain) César Ferrer-Victoria
July 12	USA F18 Futures; Peoria, United States; Clay $10,000	(United States) Greg Ouellette; 7–5, 1–6, 6–3	(South Korea) Daniel Yoo	(United States) Denis Zivkovic (United States) Andrea Collarini	(Canada) Vasek Pospisil (France) Jean-Noel Insausti (United States) Bryan Koniecko (United States) Robbye Poole
July 12	USA F18 Futures; Peoria, United States; Clay $10,000	(United States) Taylor Fogleman (United States) Benjamin Rogers; 6–2, 6–4	(United States) Sekou Bangoura (United States) Jack Sock	(United States) Denis Zivkovic (United States) Andrea Collarini	(Canada) Vasek Pospisil (France) Jean-Noel Insausti (United States) Bryan Koniecko (United States) Robbye Poole
July 19	Estonia F2 Futures; Tallinn, Estonia; Clay $15,000	(Estonia) Jürgen Zopp; 6–3, 3–6, 6–3	(Finland) Timo Nieminen	(Uruguay) Marcel Felder (Sweden) Michael Ryderstedt	(Bosnia and Herzegovina) Aldin Šetkić (Chile) Hans Podlipnik Castillo (Latvia) Andis Juška (Finland) Juho Paukku
July 19	Estonia F2 Futures; Tallinn, Estonia; Clay $15,000	(Finland) Harri Heliövaara (Finland) Juho Paukku; 6–3, 6–2	(Ukraine) Aleksandr Agafonov (Uruguay) Marcel Felder	(Uruguay) Marcel Felder (Sweden) Michael Ryderstedt	(Bosnia and Herzegovina) Aldin Šetkić (Chile) Hans Podlipnik Castillo (Latvia) Andis Juška (Finland) Juho Paukku
July 19	Iran F2 Futures; Tehran, Iran; Clay $15,000	(Hungary) Attila Balázs; 6–1, 6–4	(Greece) Paris Gemouchidis	(Syria) Marc Abdelnour (Kuwait) Abdullah Maqdes	(Hungary) György Balázs (India) Rohan Gajjar (India) Rupesh Roy (China) Xu Junchao
July 19	Iran F2 Futures; Tehran, Iran; Clay $15,000	(Hungary) Attila Balázs (Hungary) György Balázs; 6–1, 6–3	(Chinese Taipei) Huang Liang-chi (India) Rupesh Roy	(Syria) Marc Abdelnour (Kuwait) Abdullah Maqdes	(Hungary) György Balázs (India) Rohan Gajjar (India) Rupesh Roy (China) Xu Junchao
July 19	Ireland F1 Futures; Dublin, Ireland; Carpet $15,000	(United Kingdom) Daniel Cox; 6–1, 3–6, 6–3	(Italy) Andrea Falgheri	(Republic of Ireland) James McGee (Slovakia) Miloslav Mečíř Jr.	(Sweden) Carl Bergman (France) Simon Cauvard (Netherlands) Xander Spong (Republic of Ireland) Colin O'Brien
July 19	Ireland F1 Futures; Dublin, Ireland; Carpet $15,000	(Republic of Ireland) James Cluskey (Republic of Ireland) Colin O'Brien; 6–2, 7–6^{(7–1)}	(Australia) Colin Ebelthite (Republic of Ireland) Barry King	(Republic of Ireland) James McGee (Slovakia) Miloslav Mečíř Jr.	(Sweden) Carl Bergman (France) Simon Cauvard (Netherlands) Xander Spong (Republic of Ireland) Colin O'Brien
July 19	Italy F18 Futures; Modena, Italy; Clay $15,000	(Italy) Matteo Viola; 6–1, 4–6, 6–1	(Slovenia) Blaž Rola	(Italy) Luca Vanni (Italy) Andrea Arnaboldi	(Italy) Francesco Aldi (France) Jonathan Eysseric (Czech Republic) Marek Michalička (Bulgaria) Grigor Dimitrov
July 19	Italy F18 Futures; Modena, Italy; Clay $15,000	(Italy) Francesco Aldi (Italy) Walter Trusendi; 6–3, 6–4	(Italy) Filippo Leonardi (Italy) Jacopo Marchegiani	(Italy) Luca Vanni (Italy) Andrea Arnaboldi	(Italy) Francesco Aldi (France) Jonathan Eysseric (Czech Republic) Marek Michalička (Bulgaria) Grigor Dimitrov
July 19	Argentina F14 Futures; Rafaela, Argentina; Clay $10,000	(Argentina) Andrés Molteni; 3–6, 7–6^{(7–0)}, 6–1	(Argentina) Facundo Argüello	(Italy) Stefano Travaglia (Chile) Cristóbal Saavedra Corvalán	(Argentina) Juan-Pablo Amado (Argentina) Rodrigo Gómez Saigos (Argentina) Juan-Manuel Agasarkissian (Argentina) Pablo Galdón
July 19	Argentina F14 Futures; Rafaela, Argentina; Clay $10,000	(Argentina) Andrés Molteni (Argentina) Diego Sebastián Schwartzman; 6–3, 6–4	(Argentina) Facundo Argüello (Argentina) Federico Coria	(Italy) Stefano Travaglia (Chile) Cristóbal Saavedra Corvalán	(Argentina) Juan-Pablo Amado (Argentina) Rodrigo Gómez Saigos (Argentina) Juan-Manuel Agasarkissian (Argentina) Pablo Galdón
July 19	Brazil F16 Futures; Jundiaí, Brazil; Clay $10,000	(Brazil) Rogério Dutra da Silva; 6–3, 7–5	(Brazil) Fernando Romboli	(Brazil) Júlio Silva (Brazil) Marcelo Demoliner	(Brazil) Leonardo Kirche (Brazil) André Miele (Argentina) Juan-Pablo Villar (Brazil) Rodrigo Guidolin
July 19	Brazil F16 Futures; Jundiaí, Brazil; Clay $10,000	(Brazil) Rogério Dutra da Silva (Brazil) Júlio Silva; 6–3, 6–2	(Brazil) Marcelo Demoliner (Brazil) Rodrigo Guidolin	(Brazil) Júlio Silva (Brazil) Marcelo Demoliner	(Brazil) Leonardo Kirche (Brazil) André Miele (Argentina) Juan-Pablo Villar (Brazil) Rodrigo Guidolin
July 19	Romania F8 Futures; Craiova, Romania; Clay $10,000	(Croatia) Kristijan Mesaroš; 7–6^{(7–5)}, 6–4	(Romania) Andrei Mlendea	(Ukraine) Gleb Alekseenko (Morocco) Hicham Khaddari	(Moldova) Andrei Ciumac (France) Gleb Sakharov (Romania) Marcel-Ioan Miron (France) Maxime Teixeira
July 19	Romania F8 Futures; Craiova, Romania; Clay $10,000	(Romania) Andrei Mlendea (Russia) Mikhail Vasiliev; 7–5, 7–6^{(7–3)}	(Ukraine) Gleb Alekseenko (Czech Republic) Jiří Školoudík	(Ukraine) Gleb Alekseenko (Morocco) Hicham Khaddari	(Moldova) Andrei Ciumac (France) Gleb Sakharov (Romania) Marcel-Ioan Miron (France) Maxime Teixeira
July 19	Spain F26 Futures; Gandia, Spain; Clay $10,000	(Spain) Marc Fornell; 7–6^{(7–4)}, 3–6, 6–2	(Spain) Juan Lizariturry	(Spain) David Estruch (United Kingdom) Morgan Phillips	(Spain) José Checa Calvo (Spain) Pablo Martín-Adalia (Netherlands) Miliaan Niesten (Spain) Carlos Calderón-Rodríguez
July 19	Spain F26 Futures; Gandia, Spain; Clay $10,000	(Spain) César Ferrer-Victoria (Spain) Pablo Martín-Adalia; 6–3, 6–3	(Spain) Carlos Calderón-Rodríguez (Spain) Marc Fornell	(Spain) David Estruch (United Kingdom) Morgan Phillips	(Spain) José Checa Calvo (Spain) Pablo Martín-Adalia (Netherlands) Miliaan Niesten (Spain) Carlos Calderón-Rodríguez
July 19	USA F19 Futures; Joplin, United States; Hard $10,000	(United States) Robbye Poole; 6–1, 6–4	(United States) Joel Kielbowicz	(China) Chang Yu (United States) Jordan Cox	(United States) Greg Ouellette (Mexico) Antonio Ruiz-Rosales (United States) Denis Zivkovic (United States) Adam El Mihdawy
July 19	USA F19 Futures; Joplin, United States; Hard $10,000	(South Africa) Jean Andersen (United States) Joshua Zavala; 6–4, 6–3	(United States) Todd Paul (United States) Maciek Sykut	(China) Chang Yu (United States) Jordan Cox	(United States) Greg Ouellette (Mexico) Antonio Ruiz-Rosales (United States) Denis Zivkovic (United States) Adam El Mihdawy
July 26	Germany F10 Futures; Dortmund, Germany; Clay $15,000+H	(Bulgaria) Grigor Dimitrov; 7–5, 7–5	(Germany) Jan-Lennard Struff	(Germany) Alexander Flock (Belgium) David Goffin	(Germany) Jan Bergmann (Poland) Dawid Olejniczak (Czech Republic) Jan Mertl (New Zealand) Daniel King-Turner
July 26	Germany F10 Futures; Dortmund, Germany; Clay $15,000+H	(Netherlands Antilles) Alexander Blom (Netherlands) Wesley Koolhof; 7–6^{(7–4)}, 6–3	(Germany) Dean Jackson (Germany) Tobias Siechau	(Germany) Alexander Flock (Belgium) David Goffin	(Germany) Jan Bergmann (Poland) Dawid Olejniczak (Czech Republic) Jan Mertl (New Zealand) Daniel King-Turner
July 26	Great Britain F11 Futures; Chiswick, Great Britain; Hard $15,000	(Slovakia) Miloslav Mečíř Jr. 6–2, 6–4	(United Kingdom) Joshua Milton	(Australia) Colin Ebelthite (France) Laurent Rochette	(United Kingdom) Marcus Willis (United Kingdom) Daniel Cox (India) Vishnu Vardhan (United Kingdom) David Rice
July 26	Great Britain F11 Futures; Chiswick, Great Britain; Hard $15,000	(India) Divij Sharan (India) Vishnu Vardhan; 6–2, 6–2	(United Kingdom) James Chaudry (United Kingdom) George Coupland	(Australia) Colin Ebelthite (France) Laurent Rochette	(United Kingdom) Marcus Willis (United Kingdom) Daniel Cox (India) Vishnu Vardhan (United Kingdom) David Rice
July 26	Italy F19 Futures; La Spezia, Italy; Clay $15,000+H	(Italy) Thomas Fabbiano; 6–0, 5–7, 6–3	(Italy) Francesco Aldi	(Spain) José Checa Calvo (Italy) Stefano Ianni	(Italy) Flavio Cipolla (Sweden) Patrik Brydolf (Italy) Alessandro Giannessi (Chile) Hans Podlipnik Castillo
July 26	Italy F19 Futures; La Spezia, Italy; Clay $15,000+H	(Italy) Flavio Cipolla (Italy) Alessandro Giannessi; 6–2, 7–6^{(9–7)}	(Italy) Thomas Fabbiano (Italy) Walter Trusendi	(Spain) José Checa Calvo (Italy) Stefano Ianni	(Italy) Flavio Cipolla (Sweden) Patrik Brydolf (Italy) Alessandro Giannessi (Chile) Hans Podlipnik Castillo
July 26	Brazil F17 Futures; Uberlândia, Brazil; Clay $10,000	(Brazil) Rafael Camilo; 6–4, 6–2	(Sweden) Christian Lindell	(Brazil) Guilherme Clezar (Brazil) Fabrício Neis	(Brazil) Alexandre Bonatto (Italy) Giorgio Portaluri (Argentina) Juan-Pablo Villar (Brazil) Eládio Ribeiro Neto
July 26	Brazil F17 Futures; Uberlândia, Brazil; Clay $10,000	(Brazil) Victor Maynard (Brazil) Nicolas Santos; 4–6, 7–5, [10–2]	(Brazil) Idio Escobar (Brazil) Danilo Ferraz	(Brazil) Guilherme Clezar (Brazil) Fabrício Neis	(Brazil) Alexandre Bonatto (Italy) Giorgio Portaluri (Argentina) Juan-Pablo Villar (Brazil) Eládio Ribeiro Neto
July 26	Romania F9 Futures; Arad, Romania; Clay $10,000	(France) Maxime Teixeira; 7–5, 6–2	(Croatia) Kristijan Mesaroš	(Romania) Răzvan Sabău (Romania) Andrei Mlendea	(France) Grégoire Burquier (Romania) Robert Coman (Czech Republic) Jiří Školoudík (Austria) Michael Linzer
July 26	Romania F9 Futures; Arad, Romania; Clay $10,000	(Romania) Alexandru-Daniel Carpen (Romania) Alexandru Cătălin Marasin; 6–4, 7–5	(Moldova) Radu Albot (Moldova) Andrei Ciumac	(Romania) Răzvan Sabău (Romania) Andrei Mlendea	(France) Grégoire Burquier (Romania) Robert Coman (Czech Republic) Jiří Školoudík (Austria) Michael Linzer
July 26	Spain F27 Futures; Dénia, Spain; Clay $10,000	(Spain) Miguel Ángel López Jaén; 7–6^{(7–5)}, 5–7, 6–3	(Spain) Pablo Carreño Busta	(United Kingdom) Morgan Phillips (France) François-Arthur Vibert	(Spain) Roberto Ortega Olmedo (Spain) Marcelo Palacios-Siegenthale (Venezuela) David Souto (Spain) Carlos Calderón-Rodríguez
July 26	Spain F27 Futures; Dénia, Spain; Clay $10,000	(Spain) Carlos Calderón-Rodríguez (Spain) Pablo Carreño Busta; 6–4, 7–6^{(7–3)}	(Spain) Javier Valenzuela-González (Netherlands) Mark Vervoort	(United Kingdom) Morgan Phillips (France) François-Arthur Vibert	(Spain) Roberto Ortega Olmedo (Spain) Marcelo Palacios-Siegenthale (Venezuela) David Souto (Spain) Carlos Calderón-Rodríguez
July 26	USA F20 Futures; Godfrey, United States; Hard $10,000	(United States) Robbye Poole; 6–3, 7–5	(United States) Austin Krajicek	(Japan) Arata Onozawa (United States) Rhyne Williams	(Australia) Matt Reid (Lithuania) Dovydas Šakinis (United States) Blake Strode (United States) Evan King
July 26	USA F20 Futures; Godfrey, United States; Hard $10,000	(United States) Jordan Cox (United States) Evan King; 4–6, 6–3, [12–10]	(South Africa) Jean Andersen (United States) Joshua Zavala	(Japan) Arata Onozawa (United States) Rhyne Williams	(Australia) Matt Reid (Lithuania) Dovydas Šakinis (United States) Blake Strode (United States) Evan King

== August ==
Week of	Tournament	Winner	Runners-up	Semifinalists	Quarterfinalists
August 2	Great Britain F12 Futures; Roehampton, Great Britain; Hard $15,000	(United Kingdom) Joshua Milton; 7–6^{(7–4)}, 2–6, 6–3	(India) Vishnu Vardhan	(United Kingdom) Neal Skupski (India) Karan Rastogi	(France) Laurent Rochette (India) Yuki Bhambri (India) Divij Sharan (United Kingdom) Alexander Slabinsky
August 2	Great Britain F12 Futures; Roehampton, Great Britain; Hard $15,000	(United States) Ashwin Kumar (France) Laurent Rochette; 6–2, 6–7^{(8–10)}, [10–6]	(United Kingdom) Olivier Golding (United Kingdom) Neal Skupski	(United Kingdom) Neal Skupski (India) Karan Rastogi	(France) Laurent Rochette (India) Yuki Bhambri (India) Divij Sharan (United Kingdom) Alexander Slabinsky
August 2	Russia F3 Futures; Moscow, Russia; Clay $15,000	(Russia) Ilya Belyaev; 6–1, 6–4	(Russia) Denis Matsukevich	(Spain) Guillermo Olaso (Belarus) Siarhei Betau	(Russia) Aleksandr Lobkov (Moldova) Andrei Gorban (Russia) Mikhail Ledovskikh (Russia) Victor Baluda
August 2	Russia F3 Futures; Moscow, Russia; Clay $15,000	(Russia) Ilya Belyaev (Russia) Mikhail Elgin; 6–2, 6–2	(Kazakhstan) Alexey Kedryuk (Russia) Denis Matsukevich	(Spain) Guillermo Olaso (Belarus) Siarhei Betau	(Russia) Aleksandr Lobkov (Moldova) Andrei Gorban (Russia) Mikhail Ledovskikh (Russia) Victor Baluda
August 2	Argentina F15 Futures; Buenos Aires, Argentina; Clay $10,000	(Argentina) Facundo Argüello; 6–1, 6–4	(Argentina) Pablo Galdón	(Chile) Guillermo Rivera Aránguiz (Argentina) Guillermo Durán	(Argentina) Gastón Giussani (Chile) Cristóbal Saavedra Corvalán (Uruguay) Federico Sansonetti (Argentina) Cristhian Ignacio Benedetti
August 2	Argentina F15 Futures; Buenos Aires, Argentina; Clay $10,000	(Argentina) Guillermo Bujniewicz (Argentina) Guillermo Durán; 6–4, 6–2	(Argentina) Franco Agamenone (Argentina) Facundo Argüello	(Chile) Guillermo Rivera Aránguiz (Argentina) Guillermo Durán	(Argentina) Gastón Giussani (Chile) Cristóbal Saavedra Corvalán (Uruguay) Federico Sansonetti (Argentina) Cristhian Ignacio Benedetti
August 2	Germany F11 Futures; Wetzlar, Germany; Clay $10,000	(Germany) Alexander Flock; 7–5, 6–2	(Belgium) David Goffin	(Argentina) Juan-Martín Aranguren (Germany) Jaan-Frederik Brunken	(France) Antony Dupuis (Belgium) Arthur de Greef (Argentina) Diego Álvarez (Netherlands) Wesley Koolhof
August 2	Germany F11 Futures; Wetzlar, Germany; Clay $10,000	(Argentina) Diego Álvarez (Argentina) Juan-Martín Aranguren; 6–4, 6–2	(Germany) Andre Begemann (Czech Republic) Radek Zahraj	(Argentina) Juan-Martín Aranguren (Germany) Jaan-Frederik Brunken	(France) Antony Dupuis (Belgium) Arthur de Greef (Argentina) Diego Álvarez (Netherlands) Wesley Koolhof
August 2	Italy F20 Futures; Avezzano, Italy; Clay $10,000	(Italy) Francesco Piccari; 6–3, 6–0	(Italy) Marco Simoni	(France) Tak Khunn Wang (Italy) Andrea Falgheri	(Italy) Alessandro Colella (Italy) Lorenzo Papasidero (Italy) Giulio Torroni (Italy) Luca Vanni
August 2	Italy F20 Futures; Avezzano, Italy; Clay $10,000	(Italy) Andrea Falgheri (Italy) Claudio Grassi; 5–7, 6–2, [10–0]	(Italy) Massimo Capone (Italy) Giulio Torroni	(France) Tak Khunn Wang (Italy) Andrea Falgheri	(Italy) Alessandro Colella (Italy) Lorenzo Papasidero (Italy) Giulio Torroni (Italy) Luca Vanni
August 2	Lithuania F1 Futures; Vilnius, Lithuania; Clay $10,000	(Finland) Timo Nieminen; 7–5, 6–2	(Latvia) Deniss Pavlovs	(Belarus) Dzmitry Zhyrmont (Russia) Ivan Nedelko	(Finland) Sami Huurinainen (Czech Republic) Michal Schmid (Russia) Mikhail Vasiliev (Sweden) Milos Sekulic
August 2	Lithuania F1 Futures; Vilnius, Lithuania; Clay $10,000	(Latvia) Deniss Pavlovs (Russia) Mikhail Vasiliev; 6–3, 6–3	(Finland) Timo Nieminen (Czech Republic) Michal Schmid	(Belarus) Dzmitry Zhyrmont (Russia) Ivan Nedelko	(Finland) Sami Huurinainen (Czech Republic) Michal Schmid (Russia) Mikhail Vasiliev (Sweden) Milos Sekulic
August 2	Romania F10 Futures; Bucharest, Romania; Clay $10,000	(Romania) Andrei Mlendea; 6–3, 6–3	(France) Maxime Teixeira	(Romania) Răzvan Sabău (Romania) Victor-Mugurel Anagnastopol	(France) Frédéric Jeanclaude (Moldova) Radu Albot (Romania) Llaurentiu-Ady Gavrilă (Romania) Marcel-Ioan Miron
August 2	Romania F10 Futures; Bucharest, Romania; Clay $10,000	(Ukraine) Gleb Alekseenko (Ukraine) Vadim Alekseenko; 6–1, 1–6, [10–2]	(Romania) Llaurentiu-Ady Gavrilă (Romania) Andrei Mlendea	(Romania) Răzvan Sabău (Romania) Victor-Mugurel Anagnastopol	(France) Frédéric Jeanclaude (Moldova) Radu Albot (Romania) Llaurentiu-Ady Gavrilă (Romania) Marcel-Ioan Miron
August 2	Serbia F4 Futures; Novi Sad, Serbia; Clay $10,000	(Serbia) Dušan Lajović; 6–0, 4–6, 6–3	(Bosnia and Herzegovina) Aldin Šetkić	(Serbia) Vladimir Obradović (Serbia) Marko Djokovic	(Serbia) Nikola Bubnić (Bosnia and Herzegovina) Franjo Raspudić (Slovenia) Blaž Rola (France) Gleb Sakharov
August 2	Serbia F4 Futures; Novi Sad, Serbia; Clay $10,000	(Serbia) Boris Conkić (Serbia) Ivan Đurđević; 4–6, 6–2, [15–13]	(Serbia) Nikola Bubnić (Serbia) Miljan Zekić	(Serbia) Vladimir Obradović (Serbia) Marko Djokovic	(Serbia) Nikola Bubnić (Bosnia and Herzegovina) Franjo Raspudić (Slovenia) Blaž Rola (France) Gleb Sakharov
August 2	Slovakia F1 Futures; Piešťany, Slovakia; Clay $10,000	(France) Florian Reynet; 6–1, 6–2	(Poland) Marcin Gawron	(Poland) Błażej Koniusz (Slovakia) Ján Stančík	(Austria) Marc Rath (Czech Republic) Roman Jebavý (Czech Republic) Marek Michalička (Austria) Philip Lang
August 2	Slovakia F1 Futures; Piešťany, Slovakia; Clay $10,000	(Slovakia) Michal Pažický (Slovakia) Adrian Sikora; 6–7^{(4–7)}, 6–4, [10–8]	(Poland) Błażej Koniusz (Poland) Filip Rams	(Poland) Błażej Koniusz (Slovakia) Ján Stančík	(Austria) Marc Rath (Czech Republic) Roman Jebavý (Czech Republic) Marek Michalička (Austria) Philip Lang
August 2	Spain F28 Futures; Xàtiva, Spain; Clay $10,000	(Spain) Marc Fornell; 6–3, 6–2	(Spain) Juan Lizariturry	(Japan) Taro Daniel (Spain) Carlos Calderón-Rodríguez	(Serbia) Nikola Ćaćić (Spain) Óscar Sabate-Bretos (Spain) Marcelo Palacios-Siegenthale (Spain) David Estruch
August 2	Spain F28 Futures; Xàtiva, Spain; Clay $10,000	(Spain) Carlos Calderón-Rodríguez (Spain) Marc Fornell; 6–1, 6–3	(Portugal) Gonçalo Falcão (Portugal) Martin Trueva	(Japan) Taro Daniel (Spain) Carlos Calderón-Rodríguez	(Serbia) Nikola Ćaćić (Spain) Óscar Sabate-Bretos (Spain) Marcelo Palacios-Siegenthale (Spain) David Estruch
August 2	Thailand F1 Futures; Nonthaburi, Thailand; Hard $10,000	(Egypt) Mohamed Safwat; 7–6^{(9–7)}, 6–3	(France) Simon Cauvard	(India) Rupesh Roy (South Africa) Nikala Scholtz	(Thailand) Weerapat Doakmaiklee (Indonesia) Christopher Rungkat (India) Vijay Sundar Prashanth (Kuwait) Abdullah Maqdes
August 2	Thailand F1 Futures; Nonthaburi, Thailand; Hard $10,000	(Kuwait) Abdullah Maqdes (Germany) Sebastian Rieschick; 6–3, 7–5	(India) Vivek Shokeen (India) Ashutosh Singh	(India) Rupesh Roy (South Africa) Nikala Scholtz	(Thailand) Weerapat Doakmaiklee (Indonesia) Christopher Rungkat (India) Vijay Sundar Prashanth (Kuwait) Abdullah Maqdes
August 2	USA F21 Futures; Decatur, United States; Hard $10,000	(United States) Ryler DeHeart; 6–1, 6–1	(United States) Johnny Hamui	(United States) Daniel Nguyen (United States) Austin Krajicek	(United States) Jarmere Jenkins (United States) Robbye Poole (United States) Abraham Souza (United States) Joshua Zavala
August 2	USA F21 Futures; Decatur, United States; Hard $10,000	(United States) Jarmere Jenkins (United States) Todd Paul; 6–2, 7–5	(United States) Michael Grant (United States) Daniel Nguyen	(United States) Daniel Nguyen (United States) Austin Krajicek	(United States) Jarmere Jenkins (United States) Robbye Poole (United States) Abraham Souza (United States) Joshua Zavala
August 9	Belarus F1 Futures; Minsk, Belarus; Clay $15,000	(Spain) Guillermo Olaso; 6–2, 6–2	(Ukraine) Oleksandr Nedovyesov	(Belarus) Aliaksandr Bury (Moldova) Radu Albot	(Belarus) Nikolai Fidirko (Ukraine) Gleb Alekseenko (Belarus) Pavel Filin (Belarus) Kiryl Harbatsiuk
August 9	Belarus F1 Futures; Minsk, Belarus; Clay $15,000	(Spain) Guillermo Olaso (Czech Republic) Michal Schmid; 2–6, 6–2, [10–8]	(Belarus) Aliaksandr Bury (Belarus) Kiryl Harbatsiuk	(Belarus) Aliaksandr Bury (Moldova) Radu Albot	(Belarus) Nikolai Fidirko (Ukraine) Gleb Alekseenko (Belarus) Pavel Filin (Belarus) Kiryl Harbatsiuk
August 9	Italy F21 Futures; Appiano, Italy; Clay $15,000+H	(Italy) Marco Crugnola; 6–4, 3–6, 6–2	(Germany) Matthias Bachinger	(Italy) Alberto Brizzi (Uzbekistan) Farrukh Dustov	(Argentina) Juan-Martín Aranguren (Slovenia) Janez Semrajc (Romania) Răzvan Sabău (Australia) James Lemke
August 9	Italy F21 Futures; Appiano, Italy; Clay $15,000+H	(Egypt) Karim Maamoun (Egypt) Sherif Sabry; 6–4, 7–5	(Mexico) Luis Díaz Barriga (Mexico) Miguel Ángel Reyes-Varela	(Italy) Alberto Brizzi (Uzbekistan) Farrukh Dustov	(Argentina) Juan-Martín Aranguren (Slovenia) Janez Semrajc (Romania) Răzvan Sabău (Australia) James Lemke
August 9	Russia F4 Futures; Moscow, Russia; Clay $15,000+H	(Russia) Mikhail Vasiliev; 7–6^{(7–3)}, 6–4	(Russia) Artem Sitak	(Serbia) David Savić (Russia) Aleksandr Lobkov	(Russia) Sergei Krotiouk (Italy) Edoardo Eremin (Russia) Mikhail Fufygin (Russia) Vladimir Karusevich
August 9	Russia F4 Futures; Moscow, Russia; Clay $15,000+H	(Russia) Ilya Belyaev (Serbia) David Savić; 6–3, 6–3	(Russia) Anton Manegin (Russia) Artem Sitak	(Serbia) David Savić (Russia) Aleksandr Lobkov	(Russia) Sergei Krotiouk (Italy) Edoardo Eremin (Russia) Mikhail Fufygin (Russia) Vladimir Karusevich
August 9	Spain F29 Futures; Irun, Spain; Clay $15,000	(Bulgaria) Grigor Dimitrov; 4–6, 6–3, 6–4	(Spain) Sergio Gutiérrez Ferrol	(France) Laurent Rochette (France) Kenny de Schepper	(Spain) José Checa Calvo (Tunisia) Malek Jaziri (Japan) Hiroyasu Ehara (United Kingdom) Morgan Phillips
August 9	Spain F29 Futures; Irun, Spain; Clay $15,000	(Spain) Agustín Bojé-Ordóñez (Spain) Andoni Vivanco-Guzmán; 6–4, 6–4	(Spain) Sergio Gutiérrez Ferrol (Netherlands) Boy Westerhof	(France) Laurent Rochette (France) Kenny de Schepper	(Spain) José Checa Calvo (Tunisia) Malek Jaziri (Japan) Hiroyasu Ehara (United Kingdom) Morgan Phillips
August 9	Argentina F16 Futures; Santiago del Estero, Argentina; Clay $10,000	(Argentina) Pablo Galdón; 6–0, 6–4	(Argentina) Guillermo Durán	(Argentina) Juan-Pablo Amado (Chile) Cristóbal Saavedra Corvalán	(Argentina) Agustín Picco (Argentina) Diego Sebastián Schwartzman (Argentina) Federico Coria (Argentina) Facundo Argüello
August 9	Argentina F16 Futures; Santiago del Estero, Argentina; Clay $10,000	(Argentina) Guillermo Bujniewicz (Argentina) Guillermo Durán; 4–6, 6–2, [10–4]	(Argentina) Diego Cristin (Uruguay) Martín Cuevas	(Argentina) Juan-Pablo Amado (Chile) Cristóbal Saavedra Corvalán	(Argentina) Agustín Picco (Argentina) Diego Sebastián Schwartzman (Argentina) Federico Coria (Argentina) Facundo Argüello
August 9	Austria F3 Futures; Bad Waltersdorf, Austria; Clay $10,000	(Slovenia) Blaž Rola; 7–5, 6–3	(Austria) Pascal Brunner	(Austria) Gerard Kamitz (Czech Republic) Michal Konečný	(Austria) Philip Lang (Czech Republic) Radim Urbánek (United Kingdom) James Feaver (Germany) Jakob Sude
August 9	Austria F3 Futures; Bad Waltersdorf, Austria; Clay $10,000	(Austria) Nicolas Reissig (Austria) Tristan-Samuel Weissborn; 6–2, 6–3	(Czech Republic) Michal Konečný (Czech Republic) Radim Urbánek	(Austria) Gerard Kamitz (Czech Republic) Michal Konečný	(Austria) Philip Lang (Czech Republic) Radim Urbánek (United Kingdom) James Feaver (Germany) Jakob Sude
August 9	Belgium F1 Futures; Eupen, Belgium; Clay $10,000	(Belgium) David Goffin; 6–3, 4–6, 6–3	(Germany) Peter Torebko	(France) Paterne Mamata (Belgium) Germain Gigounon	(Belgium) Arthur de Greef (France) Tak Khunn Wang (Netherlands) Nick van der Meer (Germany) Jan-Lennard Struff
August 9	Belgium F1 Futures; Eupen, Belgium; Clay $10,000	(Germany) Dominik Pfeiffer (Germany) Peter Torebko; 7–5, 7–6^{(7–3)}	(Netherlands) Bart Brons (Netherlands) Tim van Terheijden	(France) Paterne Mamata (Belgium) Germain Gigounon	(Belgium) Arthur de Greef (France) Tak Khunn Wang (Netherlands) Nick van der Meer (Germany) Jan-Lennard Struff
August 9	Finland F1 Futures; Vierumäki, Finland; Clay $10,000	(Finland) Juho Paukku; 6–2, 7–5	(Finland) Micke Kontinen	(Finland) Timo Nieminen (France) Gianni Mina	(Italy) Filippo Leonardi (Russia) Ivan Nedelko (Norway) Erling Tveit (Poland) Grzegorz Panfil
August 9	Finland F1 Futures; Vierumäki, Finland; Clay $10,000	(Finland) Harri Heliövaara (Finland) Juho Paukku; 6–1, 6–4	(Italy) Filippo Leonardi (Italy) Jacopo Marchegiani	(Finland) Timo Nieminen (France) Gianni Mina	(Italy) Filippo Leonardi (Russia) Ivan Nedelko (Norway) Erling Tveit (Poland) Grzegorz Panfil
August 9	Germany F12 Futures; Friedberg, Germany; Clay $10,000	(France) Augustin Gensse; 6–4, 6–3	(Belgium) Alexandre Folie	(France) Antony Dupuis (Germany) Jan-Frederik Brunken	(Australia) Clinton Thomson (Germany) Richard Waite (Germany) Julian Lenz (Germany) Sebastian Sachs
August 9	Germany F12 Futures; Friedberg, Germany; Clay $10,000	(France) Pierre-Hugues Herbert (United States) Nicolas Meister; 4–6, 6–3, [10–6]	(Australia) Joshua Crowe (Germany) Pirmin Hänle	(France) Antony Dupuis (Germany) Jan-Frederik Brunken	(Australia) Clinton Thomson (Germany) Richard Waite (Germany) Julian Lenz (Germany) Sebastian Sachs
August 9	Serbia F5 Futures; Novi Sad, Serbia; Clay $10,000	(Bosnia and Herzegovina) Aldin Šetkić; 6–1, 6–1	(Serbia) Marko Djokovic	(Serbia) Boris Conkić (Romania) Victor-Mugurel Anagnastopol	(Serbia) Vladimir Obradović (Croatia) Ante Pavić (Serbia) Ivan Bjelica (Serbia) Miljan Zekić
August 9	Serbia F5 Futures; Novi Sad, Serbia; Clay $10,000	(Serbia) Dušan Lajović (Serbia) Ilija Vučić; 7–5, 5–7, [10–8]	(Mexico) Javier Herrera-Eguiluz (Australia) Brendan Moore	(Serbia) Boris Conkić (Romania) Victor-Mugurel Anagnastopol	(Serbia) Vladimir Obradović (Croatia) Ante Pavić (Serbia) Ivan Bjelica (Serbia) Miljan Zekić
August 9	Slovakia F2 Futures; Piešťany, Slovakia; Clay $10,000	(Poland) Marcin Gawron; 6–3, 6–1	(Czech Republic) Marek Michalička	(France) Florian Reynet (Slovakia) Norbert Gombos	(France) Jérôme Inzerillo (Slovakia) Adrian Partl (Austria) Michael Linzer (Czech Republic) David Šodek
August 9	Slovakia F2 Futures; Piešťany, Slovakia; Clay $10,000	(France) Jérôme Inzerillo (France) Florian Reynet; 6–4, 4–6, [10–8]	(Czech Republic) Roman Jebavý (Czech Republic) Marek Michalička	(France) Florian Reynet (Slovakia) Norbert Gombos	(France) Jérôme Inzerillo (Slovakia) Adrian Partl (Austria) Michael Linzer (Czech Republic) David Šodek
August 9	Thailand F2 Futures; Phitsanulok, Thailand; Hard $10,000	(Germany) Sebastian Rieschick; 6–4, 6–1	(Japan) Hiroki Kondo	(France) Simon Cauvard (South Korea) Jeong Suk-young	(Thailand) Weerapat Doakmaiklee (India) Karan Rastogi (India) Rupesh Roy (Australia) Kaden Hensel
August 9	Thailand F2 Futures; Phitsanulok, Thailand; Hard $10,000	(Japan) Hiroki Kondo (India) Ashutosh Singh; 6–4, 7–5	(Japan) Yaoki Ishii (Japan) Arata Onozawa	(France) Simon Cauvard (South Korea) Jeong Suk-young	(Thailand) Weerapat Doakmaiklee (India) Karan Rastogi (India) Rupesh Roy (Australia) Kaden Hensel
August 16	Belarus F2 Futures; Minsk, Belarus; Clay $15,000	(Spain) Guillermo Olaso; 6–1, 7–6^{(7–5)}	(Belarus) Siarhei Betau	(Germany) Patrick Taubert (Serbia) David Savić	(Ukraine) Aleksandr Agafonov (Moldova) Radu Albot (Italy) Andrea Falgheri (Russia) Andemir Karanashev
August 16	Belarus F2 Futures; Minsk, Belarus; Clay $15,000	(Belarus) Nikolai Fidirko (Belarus) Andrei Vasilevski; 6–4, 7–5	(Russia) Andrei Levine (Serbia) David Savić	(Germany) Patrick Taubert (Serbia) David Savić	(Ukraine) Aleksandr Agafonov (Moldova) Radu Albot (Italy) Andrea Falgheri (Russia) Andemir Karanashev
August 16	Colombia F1 Futures; Bogotá, Colombia; Clay $15,000	(Argentina) Sebastián Decoud; 6–4, 6–3	(Chile) Guillermo Rivera Aránguiz	(Dominican Republic) Víctor Estrella (Colombia) Eduardo Struvay	(Ecuador) Julio César Campozano (Ecuador) Iván Endara (Mexico) Daniel Garza (El Salvador) Marcelo Arévalo
August 16	Colombia F1 Futures; Bogotá, Colombia; Clay $15,000	(Peru) Mauricio Echazú (United States) Maciek Sykut; 3–6, 6–3, [10–8]	(Mexico) Daniel Garza (United States) Denis Zivkovic	(Dominican Republic) Víctor Estrella (Colombia) Eduardo Struvay	(Ecuador) Julio César Campozano (Ecuador) Iván Endara (Mexico) Daniel Garza (El Salvador) Marcelo Arévalo
August 16	Italy F22 Futures; Padova, Italy; Clay $15,000+H	(Italy) Matteo Viola; 7–5, 6–1	(Serbia) Dušan Lajović	(France) Romain Jouan (Slovenia) Janez Semrajc	(Italy) Alberto Brizzi (Bulgaria) Grigor Dimitrov (Germany) Matthias Bachinger (Colombia) Alejandro González
August 16	Italy F22 Futures; Padova, Italy; Clay $15,000+H	(Italy) Marco Crugnola (Italy) Alessandro Motti; 3–6, 6–3, [10–8]	(France) Olivier Charroin (France) Romain Jouan	(France) Romain Jouan (Slovenia) Janez Semrajc	(Italy) Alberto Brizzi (Bulgaria) Grigor Dimitrov (Germany) Matthias Bachinger (Colombia) Alejandro González
August 16	Poland F5 Futures; Olsztyn, Poland; Clay $15,000	(Germany) Alexander Flock; 6–1, 6–4	(Austria) Max Raditschnigg	(Slovakia) Pavol Červenák (Germany) Alexander Satschko	(Poland) Dawid Celt (Poland) Marcin Gawron (France) Pierre-Hugues Herbert (Australia) Joel Lindner
August 16	Poland F5 Futures; Olsztyn, Poland; Clay $15,000	(Poland) Mateusz Kowalczyk (Poland) Grzegorz Panfil; 6–4, 6–3	(Poland) Rafał Gozdur (Poland) Mateusz Szmigiel	(Slovakia) Pavol Červenák (Germany) Alexander Satschko	(Poland) Dawid Celt (Poland) Marcin Gawron (France) Pierre-Hugues Herbert (Australia) Joel Lindner
August 16	Russia F5 Futures; Moscow, Russia; Clay $15,000+H	(Russia) Aleksandr Lobkov; 6–4, 6–4	(Russia) Mikhail Vasiliev	(Russia) Artem Sitak (Russia) Ilya Belyaev	(Italy) Edoardo Eremin (Russia) Dmitry Vlasov (Russia) Stanislav Vovk (Russia) Alexander Rumyantsev
August 16	Russia F5 Futures; Moscow, Russia; Clay $15,000+H	(Russia) Richard Muzaev (Russia) Sergey Strelkov; 6–3, 3–6, [10–3]	(Russia) Alexei Filenkov (Russia) Stanislav Vovk	(Russia) Artem Sitak (Russia) Ilya Belyaev	(Italy) Edoardo Eremin (Russia) Dmitry Vlasov (Russia) Stanislav Vovk (Russia) Alexander Rumyantsev
August 16	Spain F30 Futures; Vigo, Spain; Clay $15,000	(Spain) Pablo Santos; 7–6^{(7–3)}, 6–4	(Spain) David Estruch	(Italy) Claudio Fortuna (Canada) Steven Diez	(Spain) Marcelo Palacios-Siegenthale (Spain) Rafael Mazón-Hernández (Portugal) Gonçalo Pereira (Luxembourg) Mike Vermeer
August 16	Spain F30 Futures; Vigo, Spain; Clay $15,000	(Spain) Abraham González-Jiménez (Spain) Roberto Ortega Olmedo; 1–6, 6–3, [10–5]	(Spain) Eduardo Nicolás-Espin (Spain) Germán Puentes-Alcaniz	(Italy) Claudio Fortuna (Canada) Steven Diez	(Spain) Marcelo Palacios-Siegenthale (Spain) Rafael Mazón-Hernández (Portugal) Gonçalo Pereira (Luxembourg) Mike Vermeer
August 16	Argentina F17 Futures; Salta, Argentina; Clay $10,000	(Argentina) Joaquín-Jesús Monteferrario; 7–6^{(7–3)}, 3–6, 7–6^{(14–12)}	(Italy) Stefano Travaglia	(Argentina) Diego Sebastián Schwartzman (Argentina) Agustín Picco	(Argentina) Facundo Mena (Argentina) Agustín Velotti (Argentina) Kevin Konfederak (Argentina) Gastón Giussani
August 16	Argentina F17 Futures; Salta, Argentina; Clay $10,000	(Argentina) Guillermo Bujniewicz (Chile) Cristóbal Saavedra Corvalán; 6–4, 3–6, [10–5]	(Argentina) Rodrigo Gómez Saigos (Argentina) Gustavo Sterin	(Argentina) Diego Sebastián Schwartzman (Argentina) Agustín Picco	(Argentina) Facundo Mena (Argentina) Agustín Velotti (Argentina) Kevin Konfederak (Argentina) Gastón Giussani
August 16	Austria F4 Futures; St. Poelten, Austria; Clay $10,000	(Czech Republic) Daniel Lustig; 6–4, 6–2	(Georgia (country)) Lado Chikhladze	(Australia) James Lemke (Austria) Nicolas Reissig	(Czech Republic) Roman Vögeli (Austria) Gerald Melzer (Austria) Tristan-Samuel Weissborn (Germany) Richard Waite
August 16	Austria F4 Futures; St. Poelten, Austria; Clay $10,000	(Australia) Colin Ebelthite (Australia) James Lemke; 7–5, 6–3	(Austria) Pascal Brunner (Georgia (country)) Lado Chikhladze	(Australia) James Lemke (Austria) Nicolas Reissig	(Czech Republic) Roman Vögeli (Austria) Gerald Melzer (Austria) Tristan-Samuel Weissborn (Germany) Richard Waite
August 16	Belgium F2 Futures; Koksijde, Belgium; Clay $10,000	(France) Jonathan Eysseric; 2–6, 6–2, 6–2	(France) Tak Khunn Wang	(Germany) Sascha Klör (France) Grégoire Burquier	(Germany) Peter Torebko (Belgium) Marco Dierckx (Belgium) Yannick Vandenbulcke (Netherlands) Roy Bruggeling
August 16	Belgium F2 Futures; Koksijde, Belgium; Clay $10,000	(Netherlands) Bart Brons (Netherlands) Tim van Terheijden; 6–4, 6–4	(Netherlands Antilles) Alexander Blom (Netherlands) Wesley Koolhof	(Germany) Sascha Klör (France) Grégoire Burquier	(Germany) Peter Torebko (Belgium) Marco Dierckx (Belgium) Yannick Vandenbulcke (Netherlands) Roy Bruggeling
August 16	Brazil F19 Futures; São José dos Campos, Brazil; Clay $10,000	(Brazil) André Miele; 6–4, 1–6, 6–4	(Sweden) Christian Lindell	(Brazil) Eládio Ribeiro Neto (Argentina) Juan-Pablo Villar	(Italy) Daniel Alejandro López (Brazil) José Pereira (Brazil) Andrew Lauret (Brazil) Danilo Ferraz
August 16	Brazil F19 Futures; São José dos Campos, Brazil; Clay $10,000	(Brazil) Thiago Augusto Bittencourt Pinheiro (Brazil) Idio Escobar; 2–6, 6–2, [10–5]	(Brazil) Fabiano de Paula (Sweden) Christian Lindell	(Brazil) Eládio Ribeiro Neto (Argentina) Juan-Pablo Villar	(Italy) Daniel Alejandro López (Brazil) José Pereira (Brazil) Andrew Lauret (Brazil) Danilo Ferraz
August 16	Bulgaria F4 Futures; Sofia, Bulgaria; Clay $10,000	(Argentina) Diego Álvarez; 6–4, 6–3	(Sweden) Michael Ryderstedt	(Spain) Óscar Sabate-Bretos (Bulgaria) Todor Enev	(Italy) Massimo Capone (Romania) Dragoș Dima (Germany) Steven Moneke (Belgium) Alexandre Folie
August 16	Bulgaria F4 Futures; Sofia, Bulgaria; Clay $10,000	(Germany) Pirmin Hänle (Spain) Óscar Sabate-Bretos; 6–4, 3–6, [10–7]	(Bulgaria) Boris Nicola Bakalov (Bulgaria) Alexandar Lazov	(Spain) Óscar Sabate-Bretos (Bulgaria) Todor Enev	(Italy) Massimo Capone (Romania) Dragoș Dima (Germany) Steven Moneke (Belgium) Alexandre Folie
August 16	Croatia F4 Futures; Čakovec, Croatia; Clay $10,000	(Croatia) Kristijan Mesaroš; 6–1, 4–1 retired	(Bosnia and Herzegovina) Ismar Gorčić	(Croatia) Toni Androić (Bosnia and Herzegovina) Mirza Bašić	(Bosnia and Herzegovina) Tomislav Brkić (Croatia) Ivan Cerović (Croatia) Mislav Hižak (Croatia) Ante Pavić
August 16	Croatia F4 Futures; Čakovec, Croatia; Clay $10,000	(Croatia) Marin Draganja (Croatia) Dino Marcan; 6–2, 6–4	(Croatia) Krešimir Ritz (Germany) Guido Tröster	(Croatia) Toni Androić (Bosnia and Herzegovina) Mirza Bašić	(Bosnia and Herzegovina) Tomislav Brkić (Croatia) Ivan Cerović (Croatia) Mislav Hižak (Croatia) Ante Pavić
August 16	Latvia F1 Futures; Jūrmala, Latvia; Clay $10,000	(France) Augustin Gensse; 6–3, 6–2	(Czech Republic) David Novák	(Italy) Marco Simoni (Australia) Jarryd Maher	(Sweden) Milos Sekulic (Russia) Ivan Nedelko (Republic of Ireland) Colin O'Brien (Chile) Hans Podlipnik Castillo
August 16	Latvia F1 Futures; Jūrmala, Latvia; Clay $10,000	(Republic of Ireland) James Cluskey (Republic of Ireland) Colin O'Brien; 2–6, 6–3, [14–12]	(Czech Republic) Jakub Lustyk (Czech Republic) David Novák	(Italy) Marco Simoni (Australia) Jarryd Maher	(Sweden) Milos Sekulic (Russia) Ivan Nedelko (Republic of Ireland) Colin O'Brien (Chile) Hans Podlipnik Castillo
August 16	Serbia F6 Futures; Sombor, Serbia; Clay $10,000	(Serbia) Ivan Bjelica; 6–3, 6–2	(Serbia) Miljan Zekić	(Serbia) Danilo Petrović (France) Gleb Sakharov	(Serbia) Nikola Ćaćić (Serbia) Vladimir Obradović (Serbia) Dejan Katić (Serbia) Arsenije Zlatanović
August 16	Serbia F6 Futures; Sombor, Serbia; Clay $10,000	(Serbia) Ivan Bjelica (Serbia) Miljan Zekić; 6–3, 6–4	(Mexico) Javier Herrera-Eguiluz (Australia) Brendan Moore	(Serbia) Danilo Petrović (France) Gleb Sakharov	(Serbia) Nikola Ćaćić (Serbia) Vladimir Obradović (Serbia) Dejan Katić (Serbia) Arsenije Zlatanović
August 16	Slovakia F3 Futures; Michalovce, Slovakia; Clay $10,000	(Slovakia) Michal Pažický; 6–2, 5–7, 6–2	(Czech Republic) Roman Jebavý	(Slovakia) Norbert Gombos (Czech Republic) Michal Konečný	(Switzerland) Riccardo Maiga (Czech Republic) Ľubomír Majšajdr (Austria) Michael Linzer (Austria) Herbert Wiltschnig
August 16	Slovakia F3 Futures; Michalovce, Slovakia; Clay $10,000	(Slovakia) Michal Pažický (Slovakia) Adrian Sikora; 6–2, 6–4	(Czech Republic) Roman Jebavý (Czech Republic) Ľubomír Majšajdr	(Slovakia) Norbert Gombos (Czech Republic) Michal Konečný	(Switzerland) Riccardo Maiga (Czech Republic) Ľubomír Majšajdr (Austria) Michael Linzer (Austria) Herbert Wiltschnig
August 16	Thailand F3 Futures; Nakhon Ratchasima, Thailand; Hard $10,000	(Germany) Sebastian Rieschick; 6–1, 6–1	(South Korea) Jeong Suk-young	(South Africa) Ruan Roelofse (France) Simon Cauvard	(Japan) Kento Takeuchi (Japan) Shuichi Sekiguchi (China) Gao Wan (China) Xu Junchao
August 16	Thailand F3 Futures; Nakhon Ratchasima, Thailand; Hard $10,000	(Germany) Sebastian Rieschick (Thailand) Danai Udomchoke; 6–4, 6–4	(Thailand) Sanchai Ratiwatana (Thailand) Sonchat Ratiwatana	(South Africa) Ruan Roelofse (France) Simon Cauvard	(Japan) Kento Takeuchi (Japan) Shuichi Sekiguchi (China) Gao Wan (China) Xu Junchao
August 23	Brazil F21 Futures; Campo Grande, Brazil; Clay $15,000+H	(Brazil) Rogério Dutra da Silva; 6–7^{(9–11)}, 7–5, 4–0 retired	(Brazil) Eládio Ribeiro Neto	(Sweden) Christian Lindell (Brazil) Thales Turini	(Brazil) Rodrigo Guidolin (Argentina) Pablo Galdón (Argentina) Juan-Pablo Amado (Brazil) André Miele
August 23	Brazil F21 Futures; Campo Grande, Brazil; Clay $15,000+H	(Brazil) Rafael Camilo (Uruguay) Marcel Felder; 6–4, 5–7, [14–12]	(Brazil) André Ghem (Brazil) Rodrigo Guidolin	(Sweden) Christian Lindell (Brazil) Thales Turini	(Brazil) Rodrigo Guidolin (Argentina) Pablo Galdón (Argentina) Juan-Pablo Amado (Brazil) André Miele
August 23	Colombia F2 Futures; Medellín, Colombia; Clay $15,000	(Argentina) Sebastián Decoud; 7–6^{(8–6)}, 7–5	(Chile) Guillermo Rivera Aránguiz	(United States) Denis Zivkovic (Ecuador) Emilio Gómez	(Peru) Mauricio Echazú (Colombia) Sebastián Serrano (Mexico) Daniel Garza (Ecuador) Julio César Campozano
August 23	Colombia F2 Futures; Medellín, Colombia; Clay $15,000	(Ecuador) Iván Endara (Chile) Guillermo Rivera Aránguiz; 2–6, 6–3, [10–7]	(El Salvador) Marcelo Arévalo (Peru) Mauricio Echazú	(United States) Denis Zivkovic (Ecuador) Emilio Gómez	(Peru) Mauricio Echazú (Colombia) Sebastián Serrano (Mexico) Daniel Garza (Ecuador) Julio César Campozano
August 23	Italy F23 Futures; Piombino, Italy; Hard $15,000	(Italy) Claudio Grassi; 6–4, 7–6^{(7–4)}	(Italy) Francesco Piccari	(Australia) Jason Kubler (Italy) Erik Crepaldi	(France) Rudy Coco (Germany) Robin Kern (Italy) Alessandro Bega (Italy) Tomas Tenconi
August 23	Italy F23 Futures; Piombino, Italy; Hard $15,000	(Montenegro) Daniel Danilović (Italy) Claudio Grassi; 7–6^{(7–5)}, 6–4	(Italy) Enrico Fioravante (Colombia) Cristian Rodríguez	(Australia) Jason Kubler (Italy) Erik Crepaldi	(France) Rudy Coco (Germany) Robin Kern (Italy) Alessandro Bega (Italy) Tomas Tenconi
August 23	Netherlands F5 Futures; Enschede, Netherlands; Clay $15,000	(Germany) Alexander Flock; 3–6, 6–3, 6–2	(Netherlands) Boy Westerhof	(Netherlands) Justin Eleveld (Tunisia) Malek Jaziri	(Australia) Clinton Thomson (Italy) Marco Viola (Netherlands) Jannick Lupescu (Netherlands) Antal van der Duim
August 23	Netherlands F5 Futures; Enschede, Netherlands; Clay $15,000	(Australia) Clinton Thomson (Netherlands) Boy Westerhof; 7–6^{(7–2)}, 6–3	(Netherlands) Roy Bruggeling (Netherlands) Bas van der Valk	(Netherlands) Justin Eleveld (Tunisia) Malek Jaziri	(Australia) Clinton Thomson (Italy) Marco Viola (Netherlands) Jannick Lupescu (Netherlands) Antal van der Duim
August 23	Poland F6 Futures; Poznań, Poland; Clay $15,000	(Poland) Marcin Gawron; 6–3, 6–4	(United Kingdom) Alexander Slabinsky	(Poland) Robert Godlewski (Czech Republic) Michal Konečný	(Poland) Dawid Olejniczak (Hungary) Róbert Varga (Poland) Grzegorz Panfil (Poland) Błażej Koniusz
August 23	Poland F6 Futures; Poznań, Poland; Clay $15,000	(Poland) Bartosz Sawicki (Poland) Maciej Smoła; 4–6, 6–4, [10–5]	(Poland) Rafał Gozdur (Poland) Mateusz Szmigiel	(Poland) Robert Godlewski (Czech Republic) Michal Konečný	(Poland) Dawid Olejniczak (Hungary) Róbert Varga (Poland) Grzegorz Panfil (Poland) Błażej Koniusz
August 23	Austria F5 Futures; Pörtschach, Austria; Clay $10,000	(France) Axel Michon; 6–4, 7–5	(France) Antony Dupuis	(Romania) Andrei Mlendea (France) Jérôme Inzerillo	(Italy) Marco Simoni (Austria) Nicolas Reissig (Austria) Christian Magg (Austria) Marc Rath
August 23	Austria F5 Futures; Pörtschach, Austria; Clay $10,000	(Czech Republic) Jan Blecha (Austria) Gibril Diarra; 7–6^{(7–3)}, 6–3	(Austria) Björn Propst (Austria) Bastian Trinker	(Romania) Andrei Mlendea (France) Jérôme Inzerillo	(Italy) Marco Simoni (Austria) Nicolas Reissig (Austria) Christian Magg (Austria) Marc Rath
August 23	Belgium F3 Futures; Huy, Belgium; Clay $10,000	(France) Julien Obry; 3–6, 6–1, 6–2	(Germany) Sascha Klör	(Sweden) Carl Bergman (Czech Republic) Jakub Lustyk	(France) Frédéric Jeanclaude (Italy) Marco Bortolotti (France) Antoine Tassart (Germany) Marius Zay
August 23	Belgium F3 Futures; Huy, Belgium; Clay $10,000	(Belgium) Marco Dierckx (Belgium) Mario Dierckx; 6–3, 2–6, [10–8]	(Belgium) Gaëtan De Lovinfosse (Belgium) Yannick Vandenbulcke	(Sweden) Carl Bergman (Czech Republic) Jakub Lustyk	(France) Frédéric Jeanclaude (Italy) Marco Bortolotti (France) Antoine Tassart (Germany) Marius Zay
August 23	Bulgaria F5 Futures; Bourgas, Bulgaria; Clay $10,000	(Hungary) Ádám Kellner; 0–6, 7–6^{(7–4)}, 6–4	(Sweden) Michael Ryderstedt	(Germany) Steven Moneke (Italy) Federico Torresi	(Bulgaria) Tihomir Grozdanov (Romania) Teodor-Dacian Crăciun (Romania) Robert Coman (Argentina) Diego Álvarez
August 23	Bulgaria F5 Futures; Bourgas, Bulgaria; Clay $10,000	(Argentina) Diego Álvarez (Italy) Federico Torresi; 6–4, 6–2	(North Macedonia) Tomislav Jotovski (Serbia) Miljan Zekić	(Germany) Steven Moneke (Italy) Federico Torresi	(Bulgaria) Tihomir Grozdanov (Romania) Teodor-Dacian Crăciun (Romania) Robert Coman (Argentina) Diego Álvarez
August 23	Croatia F5 Futures; Vinkovci, Croatia; Clay $10,000	(Croatia) Kristijan Mesaroš; 6–4, 3–6, 7–6^{(7–5)}	(Croatia) Marin Bradarić	(Croatia) Mislav Hižak (Bosnia and Herzegovina) Tomislav Brkić	(Austria) Michael Linzer (Croatia) Ante Pavić (Croatia) Joško Topić (Slovenia) Borut Puc
August 23	Croatia F5 Futures; Vinkovci, Croatia; Clay $10,000	(Croatia) Mislav Hižak (Croatia) Ante Pavić; 6–3, 6–4	(Croatia) Toni Androić (Croatia) Marin Milan	(Croatia) Mislav Hižak (Bosnia and Herzegovina) Tomislav Brkić	(Austria) Michael Linzer (Croatia) Ante Pavić (Croatia) Joško Topić (Slovenia) Borut Puc
August 23	Germany F13 Futures; Ueberlingen, Germany; Clay $10,000	(Germany) Dennis Blömke; 4–6, 6–2, 6–3	(Czech Republic) Daniel Lustig	(Germany) David Thurner (Australia) Joel Lindner	(Germany) Peter Torebko (Moldova) Radu Albot (Republic of Ireland) James McGee (Sweden) Ervin Eleskovic
August 23	Germany F13 Futures; Ueberlingen, Germany; Clay $10,000	(Germany) Florian Fallert (Germany) Jakob Sude; 4–6, 7–5, [10–4]	(Austria) Bertram Steinberger (Italy) Matthieu Vierin	(Germany) David Thurner (Australia) Joel Lindner	(Germany) Peter Torebko (Moldova) Radu Albot (Republic of Ireland) James McGee (Sweden) Ervin Eleskovic
August 23	Mexico F5 Futures; Zacatecas, Mexico; Hard $10,000	(United Kingdom) David Rice; 6–3, 6–4	(Mexico) César Ramírez	(Mexico) Bruno Rodríguez (Haiti) Olivier Sajous	(Guatemala) Christopher Díaz Figueroa (Australia) Matheson Klein (Australia) Chris Letcher (Australia) Nima Roshan
August 23	Mexico F5 Futures; Zacatecas, Mexico; Hard $10,000	(Mexico) Juan Manuel Elizondo (Mexico) César Ramírez; 6–4, 6–7^{(2–7)}, [10–4]	(Guatemala) Christopher Díaz Figueroa (Mexico) Bruno Rodríguez	(Mexico) Bruno Rodríguez (Haiti) Olivier Sajous	(Guatemala) Christopher Díaz Figueroa (Australia) Matheson Klein (Australia) Chris Letcher (Australia) Nima Roshan
August 23	Russia F6 Futures; Sochi, Russia; Clay $10,000	(Russia) Alexander Rumyantsev; 6–4, 6–4	(Russia) Aleksandr Lobkov	(Russia) Ervand Gasparyan (Russia) Mikhail Fufygin	(Russia) Stanislav Vovk (Russia) Vitali Reshetnikov (Russia) Stepan Khotulev (Russia) Sergei Krotiouk
August 23	Russia F6 Futures; Sochi, Russia; Clay $10,000	(Russia) Ervand Gasparyan (Uzbekistan) Vadim Kutsenko; 6–4, 5–7, [10–8]	(Russia) Sergei Krotiouk (Russia) Aleksandr Lobkov	(Russia) Ervand Gasparyan (Russia) Mikhail Fufygin	(Russia) Stanislav Vovk (Russia) Vitali Reshetnikov (Russia) Stepan Khotulev (Russia) Sergei Krotiouk
August 30	Colombia F3 Futures; Manizales, Colombia; Clay $15,000	(Dominican Republic) Víctor Estrella; 6–4, 6–4	(Colombia) Juan Sebastián Cabal	(Mexico) Daniel Garza (Colombia) Eduardo Struvay	(Ecuador) Julio César Campozano (Ecuador) Iván Endara (Peru) Mauricio Echazú (Argentina) Sebastián Decoud
August 30	Colombia F3 Futures; Manizales, Colombia; Clay $15,000	(United States) Maciek Sykut (United States) Denis Zivkovic; Walkover	(Colombia) Juan Sebastián Cabal (Colombia) Eduardo Struvay	(Mexico) Daniel Garza (Colombia) Eduardo Struvay	(Ecuador) Julio César Campozano (Ecuador) Iván Endara (Peru) Mauricio Echazú (Argentina) Sebastián Decoud
August 30	Netherlands F6 Futures; Middelburg, Netherlands; Clay $15,000	(Netherlands) Matwé Middelkoop; 7–6^{(7–2)}, 6–2	(Belgium) Niels Desein	(United Kingdom) Daniel Smethurst (Finland) Timo Nieminen	(Netherlands) Bart Brons (Australia) James Lemke (Finland) Juho Paukku (Netherlands) Justin Eleveld
August 30	Netherlands F6 Futures; Middelburg, Netherlands; Clay $15,000	(Finland) Timo Nieminen (Finland) Juho Paukku; 4–6, 7–5, [10–0]	(Australia) Clinton Thomson (Netherlands) Boy Westerhof	(United Kingdom) Daniel Smethurst (Finland) Timo Nieminen	(Netherlands) Bart Brons (Australia) James Lemke (Finland) Juho Paukku (Netherlands) Justin Eleveld
August 30	Russia F7 Futures; Moscow, Russia; Clay $15,000	(Russia) Mikhail Elgin; 3–6, 7–6^{(7–5)}, 7–5	(Russia) Aleksandr Lobkov	(Belarus) Andrei Vasilevski (Ukraine) Stanislav Poplavskyy	(Russia) Vladimir Karusevich (Russia) Mikhail Vasiliev (Russia) Alexander Rumyantsev (Russia) Artem Sitak
August 30	Russia F7 Futures; Moscow, Russia; Clay $15,000	(Russia) Mikhail Elgin (Latvia) Deniss Pavlovs; 4–6, 6–4, [10–7]	(Russia) Aleksandr Lobkov (Russia) Alexander Rumyantsev	(Belarus) Andrei Vasilevski (Ukraine) Stanislav Poplavskyy	(Russia) Vladimir Karusevich (Russia) Mikhail Vasiliev (Russia) Alexander Rumyantsev (Russia) Artem Sitak
August 30	Spain F31 Futures; Santander, Spain; Clay $15,000	(United Kingdom) James Ward; 7–5, 6–4	(Spain) Guillermo Olaso	(France) Laurent Rochette (Spain) Pablo Santos	(France) Jonathan Eysseric (Spain) Agustín Bojé-Ordóñez (Portugal) João Sousa (Spain) Miguel Ángel López Jaén
August 30	Spain F31 Futures; Santander, Spain; Clay $15,000	(Spain) Miguel Ángel López Jaén (Spain) Pablo Santos; 6–2, 6–2	(Spain) Roberto Carballés Baena (Spain) Pablo Carreño Busta	(France) Laurent Rochette (Spain) Pablo Santos	(France) Jonathan Eysseric (Spain) Agustín Bojé-Ordóñez (Portugal) João Sousa (Spain) Miguel Ángel López Jaén
August 30	Austria F6 Futures; Wels, Austria; Clay $10,000	(France) Axel Michon; 6–3, 6–7^{(2–7)}, 6–3	(France) Antony Dupuis	(Austria) Pascal Brunner (Austria) Nicolas Reissig	(Austria) Florian Farnleitner (Germany) Jeremy Jahn (Austria) Herbert Wiltschnig (Austria) Philip Lang
August 30	Austria F6 Futures; Wels, Austria; Clay $10,000	(Germany) Jeremy Jahn (Austria) Herbert Wiltschnig; 6–2, 6–3	(Austria) Philip Lang (Austria) Manuel Pröll	(Austria) Pascal Brunner (Austria) Nicolas Reissig	(Austria) Florian Farnleitner (Germany) Jeremy Jahn (Austria) Herbert Wiltschnig (Austria) Philip Lang
August 30	Brazil F22 Futures; São José do Rio Preto, Brazil; Clay $10,000	(Brazil) André Miele; 6–3, 6–2	(Argentina) Juan-Pablo Amado	(Argentina) Juan-Pablo Villar (Brazil) Fabrício Neis	(Argentina) Cristhian Ignacio Benedetti (Portugal) Gastão Elias (Brazil) Ricardo Siggia (Brazil) Rafael Camilo
August 30	Brazil F22 Futures; São José do Rio Preto, Brazil; Clay $10,000	(Brazil) Rafael Camilo (Brazil) Fabrício Neis; 6–1, 6–3	(Argentina) Juan-Pablo Amado (Brazil) Rodrigo-Antonio Grilli	(Argentina) Juan-Pablo Villar (Brazil) Fabrício Neis	(Argentina) Cristhian Ignacio Benedetti (Portugal) Gastão Elias (Brazil) Ricardo Siggia (Brazil) Rafael Camilo
August 30	Bulgaria F6 Futures; Dobrich, Bulgaria; Clay $10,000	(Austria) Philipp Oswald; 6–3, 6–1	(Romania) Petru-Alexandru Luncanu	(Germany) Steven Moneke (Italy) Federico Torresi	(Romania) Robert Coman (Romania) Alexandru-Daniel Carpen (Bulgaria) Todor Enev (Bulgaria) Tihomir Grozdanov
August 30	Bulgaria F6 Futures; Dobrich, Bulgaria; Clay $10,000	(Hungary) Levente Gödry (Hungary) Ádám Kellner; 6–4, 6–2	(Romania) Robert Coman (Romania) Petru-Alexandru Luncanu	(Germany) Steven Moneke (Italy) Federico Torresi	(Romania) Robert Coman (Romania) Alexandru-Daniel Carpen (Bulgaria) Todor Enev (Bulgaria) Tihomir Grozdanov
August 30	Croatia F6 Futures; Osijek, Croatia; Clay $10,000	(Croatia) Kristijan Mesaroš; 6–3, 6–0	(Chile) Hans Podlipnik Castillo	(Croatia) Joško Topić (Croatia) Mislav Hižak	(Croatia) Krešimir Ritz (Croatia) Antonio Šančić (Serbia) Arsenije Zlatanović (Serbia) Vladimir Obradović
August 30	Croatia F6 Futures; Osijek, Croatia; Clay $10,000	(Croatia) Mislav Hižak (Croatia) Ante Pavić; 4–6, 6–2, [10–4]	(Croatia) Marin Draganja (Croatia) Dino Marcan	(Croatia) Joško Topić (Croatia) Mislav Hižak	(Croatia) Krešimir Ritz (Croatia) Antonio Šančić (Serbia) Arsenije Zlatanović (Serbia) Vladimir Obradović
August 30	Germany F14 Futures; Kempten, Germany; Clay $10,000	(Germany) Marcel Zimmermann; 6–2, 2–3 retired	(Germany) Andre Wiesler	(France) Éric Prodon (Argentina) Diego Álvarez	(Germany) Richard Waite (Montenegro) Goran Tošić (Republic of Ireland) James McGee (Serbia) Nikola Ćirić
August 30	Germany F14 Futures; Kempten, Germany; Clay $10,000	(Germany) Marc Meigel (Germany) Richard Waite; 6–3, 7–6^{(7–3)}	(Serbia) Nikola Ćirić (Montenegro) Goran Tošić	(France) Éric Prodon (Argentina) Diego Álvarez	(Germany) Richard Waite (Montenegro) Goran Tošić (Republic of Ireland) James McGee (Serbia) Nikola Ćirić
August 30	Italy F24 Futures; Trieste, Italy; Clay $10,000	(Italy) Luca Vanni; 7–5, 6–7^{(6–8)}, 6–3	(Italy) Andrea Falgheri	(Italy) Enrico Fioravante (Italy) Riccardo Sinicropi	(Italy) Luca Rovetta (Italy) Marco Viola (Italy) Alessandro Giannessi (Italy) Francesco Borgo
August 30	Italy F24 Futures; Trieste, Italy; Clay $10,000	(Mexico) Luis Díaz Barriga (Mexico) Miguel Ángel Reyes-Varela; 7–5, 6–3	(Italy) Marco Bortolotti (Italy) Alessandro Giannessi	(Italy) Enrico Fioravante (Italy) Riccardo Sinicropi	(Italy) Luca Rovetta (Italy) Marco Viola (Italy) Alessandro Giannessi (Italy) Francesco Borgo
August 30	Mexico F6 Futures; León, Mexico; Hard $10,000	(Canada) Vasek Pospisil; 6–1, 6–2	(United Kingdom) David Rice	(Mexico) Bruno Rodríguez (United States) Tyler Hochwalt	(Latvia) Kārlis Lejnieks (Philippines) Ruben Gonzales (Mexico) Víctor Romero (Mexico) Tigre Hank
August 30	Mexico F6 Futures; León, Mexico; Hard $10,000	(Mexico) Juan Manuel Elizondo (Mexico) César Ramírez; 6–3, 4–6, [10–6]	(Canada) Vasek Pospisil (Australia) Nima Roshan	(Mexico) Bruno Rodríguez (United States) Tyler Hochwalt	(Latvia) Kārlis Lejnieks (Philippines) Ruben Gonzales (Mexico) Víctor Romero (Mexico) Tigre Hank
August 30	Poland F7 Futures; Bydgoszcz, Poland; Clay $10,000	(Belarus) Siarhei Betau; 7–5, 3–6, 6–3	(Poland) Grzegorz Panfil	(Hungary) Róbert Varga (Poland) Marcin Gawron	(Poland) Maciej Smoła (Poland) Błażej Koniusz (Japan) Hiroyasu Ehara (Czech Republic) Robert Rumler
August 30	Poland F7 Futures; Bydgoszcz, Poland; Clay $10,000	(Poland) Rafał Gozdur (Poland) Mateusz Szmigiel; 6–2, 6–3	(Czech Republic) Michal Navrátil (Czech Republic) Robert Rumler	(Hungary) Róbert Varga (Poland) Marcin Gawron	(Poland) Maciej Smoła (Poland) Błażej Koniusz (Japan) Hiroyasu Ehara (Czech Republic) Robert Rumler

== September ==
Week of	Tournament	Winner	Runners-up	Semifinalists	Quarterfinalists
September 6	Australia F5 Futures; Cairns, Australia; Hard $15,000	(Australia) Dayne Kelly; 7–6^{(7–5)}, 6–4	(Australia) Michael Look	(Australia) Nick Lindahl (New Zealand) Michael Venus	(Japan) Hiroki Moriya (Japan) Toshihide Matsui (New Zealand) José Statham (Australia) Matt Reid
September 6	Australia F5 Futures; Cairns, Australia; Hard $15,000	(Australia) Colin Ebelthite (Australia) Adam Feeney; 6–0, 6–2	(Australia) Dayne Kelly (Australia) Matt Reid	(Australia) Nick Lindahl (New Zealand) Michael Venus	(Japan) Hiroki Moriya (Japan) Toshihide Matsui (New Zealand) José Statham (Australia) Matt Reid
September 6	France F13 Futures; Bagnères-de-Bigorre, France; Hard $15,000+H	(France) Grégoire Burquier; 6–3, 7–6^{(7–4)}	(France) Ludovic Walter	(France) Mathieu Rodrigues (France) Kenny de Schepper	(Italy) Riccardo Ghedin (France) Julien Obry (France) Jérémy Blandin (Austria) Nikolaus Moser
September 6	France F13 Futures; Bagnères-de-Bigorre, France; Hard $15,000+H	(Italy) Riccardo Ghedin (France) Alexandre Penaud; 3–6, 6–2, [10–8]	(France) Grégoire Burquier (France) Simon Cauvard	(France) Mathieu Rodrigues (France) Kenny de Schepper	(Italy) Riccardo Ghedin (France) Julien Obry (France) Jérémy Blandin (Austria) Nikolaus Moser
September 6	Spain F32 Futures; Oviedo, Spain; Clay $15,000	(Spain) Roberto Carballés Baena; 6–4, 6–2	(Spain) Pablo Carreño Busta	(Canada) Philip Bester (Spain) Andoni Vivanco-Guzmán	(Spain) Carlos Calderón-Rodríguez (Spain) Marcelo Palacios-Siegenthale (Spain) Guillem Collado-Castells (Spain) Juan Lizariturry
September 6	Spain F32 Futures; Oviedo, Spain; Clay $15,000	(Spain) Pablo Carreño Busta (Spain) Andoni Vivanco-Guzmán; 6–2, 4–6, [10–5]	(Canada) Philip Bester (Canada) Kamil Pajkowski	(Canada) Philip Bester (Spain) Andoni Vivanco-Guzmán	(Spain) Carlos Calderón-Rodríguez (Spain) Marcelo Palacios-Siegenthale (Spain) Guillem Collado-Castells (Spain) Juan Lizariturry
September 6	Brazil F23 Futures; Fortaleza, Brazil; Clay $10,000+H	(Brazil) Júlio Silva; 6–2, 2–6, 6–2	(Argentina) Cristhian Ignacio Benedetti	(Uruguay) Marcel Felder (Argentina) Juan-Pablo Amado	(Argentina) Juan-Pablo Villar (Brazil) Fernando Romboli (Brazil) Danilo Ferraz (Brazil) Daniel Dutra da Silva
September 6	Brazil F23 Futures; Fortaleza, Brazil; Clay $10,000+H	(Uruguay) Marcel Felder (Brazil) Fernando Romboli; 7–6^{(7–4)}, 4–6, [10–4]	(Brazil) Diego Matos (Brazil) André Miele	(Uruguay) Marcel Felder (Argentina) Juan-Pablo Amado	(Argentina) Juan-Pablo Villar (Brazil) Fernando Romboli (Brazil) Danilo Ferraz (Brazil) Daniel Dutra da Silva
September 6	Burundi F1 Futures; Bujumbura, Burundi; Clay $10,000	(Austria) Gerald Melzer; 6–2, 6–4	(Belgium) Bart Govaerts	(India) Vijayant Malik (Belgium) Marco Dierckx	(India) Rupesh Roy (Egypt) Karim Maamoun (South Africa) Ruan Roelofse (Nigeria) Clifford Enosoregbe
September 6	Burundi F1 Futures; Bujumbura, Burundi; Clay $10,000	(Belgium) Marco Dierckx (Belgium) Bart Govaerts; 6–4, 6–2	(India) Ronak Manuja (India) Shivang Mishra	(India) Vijayant Malik (Belgium) Marco Dierckx	(India) Rupesh Roy (Egypt) Karim Maamoun (South Africa) Ruan Roelofse (Nigeria) Clifford Enosoregbe
September 6	Ecuador F1 Futures; Guayaquil, Ecuador; Hard $10,000	(Ecuador) Julio César Campozano; 5–7, 6–3, 6–3	(Argentina) Nicolás Pastor	(Argentina) Tomás Buchhass (United States) Maciek Sykut	(Argentina) Armando Javier Boschetti (Argentina) Juan-Manuel Agasarkissian (France) Jean-Noel Insausti (Argentina) Maximiliano Estévez
September 6	Ecuador F1 Futures; Guayaquil, Ecuador; Hard $10,000	(Colombia) Nicolás Barrientos (Colombia) Sebastián Serrano; 6–7^{(2–6)}, 7–6^{(7–5)}, [10–7]	(Ecuador) Julio César Campozano (Ecuador) Diego Hidalgo	(Argentina) Tomás Buchhass (United States) Maciek Sykut	(Argentina) Armando Javier Boschetti (Argentina) Juan-Manuel Agasarkissian (France) Jean-Noel Insausti (Argentina) Maximiliano Estévez
September 6	Germany F15 Futures; Kenn/Trier, Germany; Clay $10,000	(France) Antony Dupuis; 6–4, 6–0	(Belgium) Alexandre Folie	(Germany) Marius Zay (Czech Republic) Jakub Lustyk	(Germany) Marc Meigel (Germany) Sami Reinwein (Germany) Holger Fischer (Latvia) Adrians Žguns
September 6	Germany F15 Futures; Kenn/Trier, Germany; Clay $10,000	(Germany) Steven Moneke (Germany) Laslo Urrutia Fuentes; 6–4, 6–0	(Germany) Marc Meigel (Germany) Pascal Meis	(Germany) Marius Zay (Czech Republic) Jakub Lustyk	(Germany) Marc Meigel (Germany) Sami Reinwein (Germany) Holger Fischer (Latvia) Adrians Žguns
September 6	Great Britain F13 Futures; Cumberland, Great Britain; Hard $10,000	(United Kingdom) Daniel Cox; 6–1, 6–1	(United Kingdom) Daniel Evans	(United Kingdom) Joshua Milton (France) Rudy Coco	(France) Baptiste Bayet (United Kingdom) Alexander Slabinsky (United Kingdom) Marcus Willis (Italy) Claudio Grassi
September 6	Great Britain F13 Futures; Cumberland, Great Britain; Hard $10,000	(United Kingdom) David Rice (United Kingdom) Sean Thornley; 2–6, 6–3, [10–0]	(Italy) Claudio Grassi (United Kingdom) Alexander Slabinsky	(United Kingdom) Joshua Milton (France) Rudy Coco	(France) Baptiste Bayet (United Kingdom) Alexander Slabinsky (United Kingdom) Marcus Willis (Italy) Claudio Grassi
September 6	Italy F25 Futures; Siena, Italy; Clay $10,000	(Italy) Luca Vanni; 6–2, 1–6, 7–6^{(7–5)}	(Italy) Filippo Leonardi	(France) Gleb Sakharov (Italy) Federico Torresi	(Italy) Pietro Fanucci (Italy) Lorenzo Giustino (Italy) Marco Viola (Italy) Tomas Tenconi
September 6	Italy F25 Futures; Siena, Italy; Clay $10,000	(Italy) Massimo Capone (Italy) Marco Viola; 7–6^{(7–2)}, 2–6, [10–2]	(Italy) Federico Torresi (Italy) Luca Vanni	(France) Gleb Sakharov (Italy) Federico Torresi	(Italy) Pietro Fanucci (Italy) Lorenzo Giustino (Italy) Marco Viola (Italy) Tomas Tenconi
September 6	Mexico F7 Futures; Guadalajara, Mexico; Hard $10,000	(Canada) Vasek Pospisil; 6–0, 6–1	(United States) Adam El Mihdawy	(Latvia) Kārlis Lejnieks (United States) Conor Pollock	(Australia) Nima Roshan (United States) Jordan Cox (Australia) Chris Letcher (Guatemala) Christopher Díaz Figueroa
September 6	Mexico F7 Futures; Guadalajara, Mexico; Hard $10,000	(Barbados) Haydn Lewis (The Bahamas) Marvin Rolle; 6–2, 7–5	(Mexico) Fernando Cabrera (Mexico) Pablo Martínez	(Latvia) Kārlis Lejnieks (United States) Conor Pollock	(Australia) Nima Roshan (United States) Jordan Cox (Australia) Chris Letcher (Guatemala) Christopher Díaz Figueroa
September 6	Russia F8 Futures; Vsevolozhsk, Russia; Clay $10,000	(Russia) Mikhail Elgin; 6–2, 6–4	(Russia) Aleksandr Lobkov	(Russia) Richard Muzaev (Sweden) Patrik Brydolf	(Belarus) Dzmitry Zhyrmont (Russia) Mikhail Fufygin (Russia) Sergei Krotiouk (Russia) Ervand Gasparyan
September 6	Russia F8 Futures; Vsevolozhsk, Russia; Clay $10,000	(Russia) Ervand Gasparyan (Russia) Vadim Kutsenko; 6–4, 6–2	(Belarus) Nikolai Fidirko (Belarus) Dzmitry Zhyrmont	(Russia) Richard Muzaev (Sweden) Patrik Brydolf	(Belarus) Dzmitry Zhyrmont (Russia) Mikhail Fufygin (Russia) Sergei Krotiouk (Russia) Ervand Gasparyan
September 13	Australia F6 Futures; Darwin, Australia; Hard $15,000	(Australia) John Millman; 6–0, 6–1	(Japan) Hiroki Moriya	(Australia) Dayne Kelly (Australia) Brydan Klein	(Japan) Toshihide Matsui (Australia) Matt Reid (India) Karan Rastogi (United States) Sean Berman
September 13	Australia F6 Futures; Darwin, Australia; Hard $15,000	(Australia) Colin Ebelthite (Australia) Adam Feeney; 6–2, 6–2	(China) Chang Yu (China) Xu Junchao	(Australia) Dayne Kelly (Australia) Brydan Klein	(Japan) Toshihide Matsui (Australia) Matt Reid (India) Karan Rastogi (United States) Sean Berman
September 13	Brazil F24 Futures; Recife, Brazil; Clay (indoor) $15,000	(Brazil) Daniel Dutra da Silva; 6–3, 1–6, 6–4	(Argentina) Juan-Pablo Villar	(Argentina) Juan-Pablo Amado (Brazil) Tiago Slonik	(Brazil) Danilo Ferraz (Argentina) Cristhian Ignacio Benedetti (Brazil) Ricardo Siggia (Brazil) Fabrício Neis
September 13	Brazil F24 Futures; Recife, Brazil; Clay (indoor) $15,000	(Argentina) Juan-Pablo Amado (Brazil) Ricardo Siggia; 7–5, 2–6, [11–9]	(Brazil) Diego Matos (Brazil) Fabrício Neis	(Argentina) Juan-Pablo Amado (Brazil) Tiago Slonik	(Brazil) Danilo Ferraz (Argentina) Cristhian Ignacio Benedetti (Brazil) Ricardo Siggia (Brazil) Fabrício Neis
September 13	France F14 Futures; Mulhouse, France; Hard (indoor) $15,000+H	(France) Clément Reix; 6–3, 6–4	(France) Romain Jouan	(Germany) Sami Reinwein (France) Grégoire Burquier	(France) Jérémy Blandin (France) Ludovic Walter (France) Mathieu Rodrigues (Germany) Matthias Bachinger
September 13	France F14 Futures; Mulhouse, France; Hard (indoor) $15,000+H	(France) Olivier Charroin (Japan) Junn Mitsuhashi; 6–2, 6–3	(France) Jérémy Blandin (France) Romain Jouan	(Germany) Sami Reinwein (France) Grégoire Burquier	(France) Jérémy Blandin (France) Ludovic Walter (France) Mathieu Rodrigues (Germany) Matthias Bachinger
September 13	Italy F26 Futures; Porto Torres, Italy; Hard $15,000	(Italy) Claudio Grassi; 3–6, 6–4, 6–4	(Italy) Luca Vanni	(Italy) Andrea Agazzi (Italy) Massimo Capone	(Italy) Filippo Leonardi (United Kingdom) David Rice (Italy) Andrea Falgheri (Belgium) Alexandre Folie
September 13	Italy F26 Futures; Porto Torres, Italy; Hard $15,000	(Italy) Claudio Grassi (Italy) Francesco Piccari; 6–4, 6–3	(Greece) Paris Gemouchidis (United Kingdom) David Rice	(Italy) Andrea Agazzi (Italy) Massimo Capone	(Italy) Filippo Leonardi (United Kingdom) David Rice (Italy) Andrea Falgheri (Belgium) Alexandre Folie
September 13	Morocco F6 Futures; Casablanca, Morocco; Clay $15,000	(France) Maxime Teixeira; 6–1, 6–3	(France) Florian Reynet	(Spain) Sergio Gutiérrez Ferrol (France) Jonathan Eysseric	(Austria) Nicolas Reissig (Russia) Valery Rudnev (Republic of Ireland) James McGee (Austria) Philipp Oswald
September 13	Morocco F6 Futures; Casablanca, Morocco; Clay $15,000	(France) Florian Reynet (France) Maxime Teixeira; 1–6, 7–5, [10–6]	(Austria) Nicolas Reissig (Austria) Tristan-Samuel Weissborn	(Spain) Sergio Gutiérrez Ferrol (France) Jonathan Eysseric	(Austria) Nicolas Reissig (Russia) Valery Rudnev (Republic of Ireland) James McGee (Austria) Philipp Oswald
September 13	Spain F33 Futures; Móstoles, Spain; Hard $15,000	(Spain) Roberto Bautista Agut; 6–7^{(4–7)}, 6–4, 6–2	(Canada) Philip Bester	(Spain) Pablo Martín-Adalia (Poland) Igor Bujdo	(Spain) Jordi Samper Montaña (Spain) Rafael Mazón-Hernández (Spain) Javier Martí (Netherlands) Scott Griekspoor
September 13	Spain F33 Futures; Móstoles, Spain; Hard $15,000	(Canada) Philip Bester (Canada) Kamil Pajkowski; 7–6^{(7–5)}, 4–6, [13–11]	(Spain) Óscar Burrieza (Spain) Javier Martí	(Spain) Pablo Martín-Adalia (Poland) Igor Bujdo	(Spain) Jordi Samper Montaña (Spain) Rafael Mazón-Hernández (Spain) Javier Martí (Netherlands) Scott Griekspoor
September 13	Sweden F1 Futures; Danderyd, Sweden; Hard (indoor) $15,000	(Finland) Henri Kontinen; 6–3, 6–4	(Finland) Timo Nieminen	(Sweden) Patrik Brydolf (Sweden) Michael Ryderstedt	(Sweden) Jonathan Greczula (Netherlands) Xander Spong (Sweden) Milos Sekulic (Republic of Ireland) Colin O'Brien
September 13	Sweden F1 Futures; Danderyd, Sweden; Hard (indoor) $15,000	(Montenegro) Daniel Danilović (Sweden) Michael Ryderstedt; 7–6^{(10–8)}, 7–6^{(11–9)}	(Sweden) Pablo Figueroa (Sweden) Rickard Holmström	(Sweden) Patrik Brydolf (Sweden) Michael Ryderstedt	(Sweden) Jonathan Greczula (Netherlands) Xander Spong (Sweden) Milos Sekulic (Republic of Ireland) Colin O'Brien
September 13	Bolivia F1 Futures; Tarija, Bolivia; Clay $10,000+H	(United States) Adam El Mihdawy; 7–6^{(7–4)}, 6–1	(Argentina) Diego Sebastián Schwartzman	(Peru) Mauricio Echazú (Bolivia) Mauricio Estívariz	(Argentina) Gastón Giussani (Bolivia) Federico Zeballos (Italy) Daniel Alejandro López (Argentina) Juan Ignacio Londero
September 13	Bolivia F1 Futures; Tarija, Bolivia; Clay $10,000+H	(Peru) Mauricio Echazú (Peru) Sergio Galdós; 6–1, 6–4	(United States) Adam El Mihdawy (Bolivia) Eduardo Kohlberg-Ruíz	(Peru) Mauricio Echazú (Bolivia) Mauricio Estívariz	(Argentina) Gastón Giussani (Bolivia) Federico Zeballos (Italy) Daniel Alejandro López (Argentina) Juan Ignacio Londero
September 13	Ecuador F2 Futures; Guayaquil, Ecuador; Hard $10,000	(Ecuador) Julio César Campozano; 6–2, 6–0	(United States) Maciek Sykut	(Argentina) Juan Pablo Ortíz (Ecuador) Diego Hidalgo	(United States) Ty Trombetta (Mexico) Manuel Sánchez (Ecuador) Bernardo Casares (Colombia) Nicolás Barrientos
September 13	Ecuador F2 Futures; Guayaquil, Ecuador; Hard $10,000	(Peru) Duilio Beretta (Ecuador) Roberto Quiroz; 6–4, 6–4	(United States) Peter Aarts (United States) Christopher Racz	(Argentina) Juan Pablo Ortíz (Ecuador) Diego Hidalgo	(United States) Ty Trombetta (Mexico) Manuel Sánchez (Ecuador) Bernardo Casares (Colombia) Nicolás Barrientos
September 13	Great Britain F14 Futures; Nottingham, Great Britain; Hard $10,000	(United Kingdom) Joshua Milton; 6–1, 7–5	(United Kingdom) Daniel Evans	(France) Rudy Coco (United Kingdom) Daniel Cox	(Japan) Takuto Niki (United Kingdom) Ahmed El Menshawy (United Kingdom) Andrew Fitzpatrick (United Kingdom) Sean Thornley
September 13	Great Britain F14 Futures; Nottingham, Great Britain; Hard $10,000	(United Kingdom) Lewis Burton (United Kingdom) Daniel Evans; 7–5, 1–6, [13–11]	(United Kingdom) Sean Thornley (United Kingdom) Marcus Willis	(France) Rudy Coco (United Kingdom) Daniel Cox	(Japan) Takuto Niki (United Kingdom) Ahmed El Menshawy (United Kingdom) Andrew Fitzpatrick (United Kingdom) Sean Thornley
September 13	Rwanda F1 Futures; Kigali, Rwanda; Clay $10,000	(Austria) Gerald Melzer; 7–6^{(10–8)}, 6–0	(Russia) Stanislav Vovk	(Romania) Bogdan-Victor Leonte (Egypt) Mohamed Safwat	(Morocco) Anas Fattar (Belgium) Bart Govaerts (Egypt) Motaz Abou El Khair (Egypt) Omar Hedayet
September 13	Rwanda F1 Futures; Kigali, Rwanda; Clay $10,000	(Russia) Alexei Filenkov (Russia) Stanislav Vovk; 2–6, 6–4, [13–11]	(Romania) Bogdan-Victor Leonte (Netherlands) Matwé Middelkoop	(Romania) Bogdan-Victor Leonte (Egypt) Mohamed Safwat	(Morocco) Anas Fattar (Belgium) Bart Govaerts (Egypt) Motaz Abou El Khair (Egypt) Omar Hedayet
September 13	USA F23 Futures; Claremont, United States; Hard $10,000	(South Africa) Gary Sacks; 7–6^{(10–8)}, 6–2	(United States) Devin Britton	(Israel) Gilad Ben Zvi (India) Karunuday Singh	(United States) Chris Kearney (Australia) Nima Roshan (United States) Conor Pollock (Australia) James Duckworth
September 13	USA F23 Futures; Claremont, United States; Hard $10,000	(United States) Taylor Fogleman (United States) Chris Kearney; 6–1, 2–6, [10–5]	(United States) Joel Kielbowicz (United States) Conor Pollock	(Israel) Gilad Ben Zvi (India) Karunuday Singh	(United States) Chris Kearney (Australia) Nima Roshan (United States) Conor Pollock (Australia) James Duckworth
September 20	Australia F7 Futures; Alice Springs, Australia; Hard $15,000	(Australia) Colin Ebelthite; 7–5, 7–6^{(7–2)}	(Australia) John Millman	(Australia) Dayne Kelly (Australia) Michael Look	(Australia) Matt Reid (Japan) Toshihide Matsui (India) Karan Rastogi (Australia) Brydan Klein
September 20	Australia F7 Futures; Alice Springs, Australia; Hard $15,000	(Australia) Colin Ebelthite (Australia) Adam Feeney; 6–4, 6–4	(Australia) Dane Propoggia (Australia) Matt Reid	(Australia) Dayne Kelly (Australia) Michael Look	(Australia) Matt Reid (Japan) Toshihide Matsui (India) Karan Rastogi (Australia) Brydan Klein
September 20	Canada F4 Futures; Toronto, Canada; Hard $15,000	(United States) Nicholas Monroe; 6–3, 3–6, 6–4	(Austria) Nikolaus Moser	(United States) Phillip Simmonds (Canada) Steven Diez	(Canada) Érik Chvojka (Canada) Frank Dancevic (Canada) Pierre-Ludovic Duclos (United States) Brendan Evans
September 20	Canada F4 Futures; Toronto, Canada; Hard $15,000	(United States) Brett Joelson (United States) Ashwin Kumar; 3–6, 6–3, [10–7]	(United States) Brendan Evans (United States) Phillip Simmonds	(United States) Phillip Simmonds (Canada) Steven Diez	(Canada) Érik Chvojka (Canada) Frank Dancevic (Canada) Pierre-Ludovic Duclos (United States) Brendan Evans
September 20	China F7 Futures; Hangzhou, China; Hard $15,000	(China) Bai Yan; 6–2, 4–6, 6–3	(Finland) Harri Heliövaara	(China) Chang Yu (China) Xu Junchao	(New Zealand) José Statham (Thailand) Kirati Siributwong (China) Ma Ya-nan (Chinese Taipei) Huang Liang-chi
September 20	China F7 Futures; Hangzhou, China; Hard $15,000	(China) Gao Peng (China) Gao Wan; 6–3, 6–7^{(3–7)}, [10–6]	(China) Xue Feng (China) Yu Xin-yuan	(China) Chang Yu (China) Xu Junchao	(New Zealand) José Statham (Thailand) Kirati Siributwong (China) Ma Ya-nan (Chinese Taipei) Huang Liang-chi
September 20	France F15 Futures; Plaisir, France; Hard (indoor) $15,000+H	(France) Clément Reix; 2–6, 7–6^{(10–8)}, 6–2	(France) Ludovic Walter	(Canada) Philip Bester (France) Romain Jouan	(France) Charles-Antoine Brézac (France) Albano Olivetti (France) Grégoire Burquier (Switzerland) Adrien Bossel
September 20	France F15 Futures; Plaisir, France; Hard (indoor) $15,000+H	(France) Nicolas Grammare (India) Ashutosh Singh; 7–6^{(7–4)}, 7–5	(France) Jérémy Blandin (France) Romain Jouan	(Canada) Philip Bester (France) Romain Jouan	(France) Charles-Antoine Brézac (France) Albano Olivetti (France) Grégoire Burquier (Switzerland) Adrien Bossel
September 20	Morocco F7 Futures; Tanger, Morocco; Clay $15,000	(Spain) Sergio Gutiérrez Ferrol; 6–4, 6–2	(France) Florian Reynet	(France) Maxime Teixeira (Austria) Philipp Oswald	(Austria) Nicolas Reissig (Egypt) Sherif Sabry (Austria) Tristan-Samuel Weissborn (Spain) Gerard Granollers
September 20	Morocco F7 Futures; Tanger, Morocco; Clay $15,000	(Spain) Gerard Granollers (Spain) Carles Poch Gradin; 6–2, 6–3	(Austria) Philipp Oswald (Netherlands) Tim van Terheijden	(France) Maxime Teixeira (Austria) Philipp Oswald	(Austria) Nicolas Reissig (Egypt) Sherif Sabry (Austria) Tristan-Samuel Weissborn (Spain) Gerard Granollers
September 20	Sweden F2 Futures; Falun, Sweden; Hard (indoor) $15,000	(Finland) Henri Kontinen; 6–3, 3–6, 7–6^{(7–5)}	(Finland) Timo Nieminen	(Latvia) Kārlis Lejnieks (Sweden) Carl Bergman	(Sweden) Pablo Figueroa (Sweden) Ervin Eleskovic (Sweden) Michael Ryderstedt (Finland) Juho Paukku
September 20	Sweden F2 Futures; Falun, Sweden; Hard (indoor) $15,000	(Sweden) Carl Bergman (Sweden) Markus Eriksson; 3–6, 6–3, [10–4]	(Sweden) Tobias Blömgren (Finland) Micke Kontinen	(Latvia) Kārlis Lejnieks (Sweden) Carl Bergman	(Sweden) Pablo Figueroa (Sweden) Ervin Eleskovic (Sweden) Michael Ryderstedt (Finland) Juho Paukku
September 20	Bolivia F2 Futures; La Paz, Bolivia; Clay $10,000	(Argentina) Guillermo Carry; 6–2, 4–2 retired	(United States) Adam El Mihdawy	(Bolivia) Federico Zeballos (Mexico) Manuel Sánchez	(Argentina) Rodrigo Scattareggia (Guatemala) Christopher Díaz Figueroa (Bolivia) Ryusei Makiguchi (Peru) Sergio Galdós
September 20	Bolivia F2 Futures; La Paz, Bolivia; Clay $10,000	(Peru) Francisco Carbajal (Guatemala) Christopher Díaz Figueroa; 6–2, 6–3	(Bolivia) Hugo Dellien (Bolivia) Federico Zeballos	(Bolivia) Federico Zeballos (Mexico) Manuel Sánchez	(Argentina) Rodrigo Scattareggia (Guatemala) Christopher Díaz Figueroa (Bolivia) Ryusei Makiguchi (Peru) Sergio Galdós
September 20	Great Britain F15 Futures; Wrexham, Great Britain; Hard $10,000	(United Kingdom) Daniel Cox; 7–6^{(7–1)}, 6–4	(United Kingdom) Joshua Milton	(United Kingdom) Sean Thornley (France) Rudy Coco	(United Kingdom) Daniel Evans (United Kingdom) Marcus Willis (France) Antony Dupuis (United Kingdom) David Rice
September 20	Great Britain F15 Futures; Wrexham, Great Britain; Hard $10,000	(United Kingdom) Lewis Burton (United Kingdom) Daniel Evans; 7–6^{(8–6)}, 6–4	(United Kingdom) David Rice (United Kingdom) Sean Thornley	(United Kingdom) Sean Thornley (France) Rudy Coco	(United Kingdom) Daniel Evans (United Kingdom) Marcus Willis (France) Antony Dupuis (United Kingdom) David Rice
September 20	Iran F3 Futures; Tehran, Iran; Clay $10,000	(Russia) Alexander Rumyantsev; 7–6^{(7–3)}, 6–3	(Russia) Aleksandr Lobkov	(Germany) Mark-Alexander Kepler (France) Jules Marie	(Syria) Issam Haitham Taweel (Russia) Ivan Nedelko (Germany) Sebastian Fitz (Japan) Koki Matsunaga
September 20	Iran F3 Futures; Tehran, Iran; Clay $10,000	(Ukraine) Ivan Anikanov (Uzbekistan) Murad Inoyatov; 6–3, 6–4	(Russia) Aleksandr Lobkov (Russia) Alexander Rumyantsev	(Germany) Mark-Alexander Kepler (France) Jules Marie	(Syria) Issam Haitham Taweel (Russia) Ivan Nedelko (Germany) Sebastian Fitz (Japan) Koki Matsunaga
September 20	Italy F27 Futures; Brusaporto, Italy; Hard (indoor) $10,000	(Sweden) Filip Prpic; 6–3, 6–4	(Lithuania) Laurynas Grigelis	(Italy) Claudio Grassi (Italy) Andrea Falgheri	(Italy) Enrico Iannuzzi (Italy) Alessandro Bega (Italy) Riccardo Sinicropi (Italy) Erik Crepaldi
September 20	Italy F27 Futures; Brusaporto, Italy; Hard (indoor) $10,000	(Italy) Erik Crepaldi (Italy) Claudio Grassi; 6–3, 6–4	(Italy) Riccardo Bellotti (Georgia (country)) Lado Chikhladze	(Italy) Claudio Grassi (Italy) Andrea Falgheri	(Italy) Enrico Iannuzzi (Italy) Alessandro Bega (Italy) Riccardo Sinicropi (Italy) Erik Crepaldi
September 20	Spain F34 Futures; Madrid, Spain; Hard $10,000	(United Kingdom) Morgan Phillips; 6–1, 6–4	(Spain) Javier Martí	(Poland) Piotr Gadomski (Spain) Carlos Gómez-Herrera	(Spain) Miguel Ángel López Jaén (Spain) Roberto Ortega Olmedo (Germany) Richard Waite (Spain) Andrés Artuñedo
September 20	Spain F34 Futures; Madrid, Spain; Hard $10,000	(Spain) Óscar Burrieza (Spain) Javier Martí; 6–0, 6–3	(Spain) Iván Arenas-Gualda (Spain) Enrique López Pérez	(Poland) Piotr Gadomski (Spain) Carlos Gómez-Herrera	(Spain) Miguel Ángel López Jaén (Spain) Roberto Ortega Olmedo (Germany) Richard Waite (Spain) Andrés Artuñedo
September 20	Uganda F1 Futures; Kampala, Uganda; Clay $10,000	(Austria) Gerald Melzer; 6–4, 6–4	(Zimbabwe) Takanyi Garanganga	(Egypt) Mohamed Safwat (Romania) Bogdan-Victor Leonte	(Russia) Stanislav Vovk (Egypt) Karim Maamoun (United Kingdom) James Feaver (South Africa) Ruan Roelofse
September 20	Uganda F1 Futures; Kampala, Uganda; Clay $10,000	(United Kingdom) James Feaver (South Africa) Ruan Roelofse; 7–6^{(10–8)}, 6–2	(Zimbabwe) Takanyi Garanganga (Uganda) Duncan Mugabe	(Egypt) Mohamed Safwat (Romania) Bogdan-Victor Leonte	(Russia) Stanislav Vovk (Egypt) Karim Maamoun (United Kingdom) James Feaver (South Africa) Ruan Roelofse
September 20	USA F24 Futures; Costa Mesa, United States; Hard $10,000	(South Africa) Fritz Wolmarans; 6–0, 6–3	(United States) Robbye Poole	(United States) Austin Krajicek (Mexico) Daniel Garza	(Bulgaria) Dimitar Kutrovsky (United States) Jordan Cox (Israel) Gilad Ben Zvi (Georgia (country)) Nikoloz Basilashvili
September 20	USA F24 Futures; Costa Mesa, United States; Hard $10,000	(Mexico) Daniel Garza (France) Fabrice Martin; 6–4, 6–2	(Philippines) Ruben Gonzales (United States) Robbye Poole	(United States) Austin Krajicek (Mexico) Daniel Garza	(Bulgaria) Dimitar Kutrovsky (United States) Jordan Cox (Israel) Gilad Ben Zvi (Georgia (country)) Nikoloz Basilashvili
September 27	Canada F5 Futures; Markham, Canada; Hard (indoor) $15,000	(Canada) Vasek Pospisil; 6–3, 6–2	(United States) Nicholas Monroe	(United States) Phillip Simmonds (Canada) Chris Klingemann	(United States) Connor Pollock (Australia) Jarryd Maher (Canada) Philip Bester (United States) Brendan Evans
September 27	Canada F5 Futures; Markham, Canada; Hard (indoor) $15,000	(United States) Chris Kwon (United States) Connor Pollock; 3–6, 7–6^{(7–2)}, [12–10]	(United States) Brendan Evans (Canada) Chris Klingemann	(United States) Phillip Simmonds (Canada) Chris Klingemann	(United States) Connor Pollock (Australia) Jarryd Maher (Canada) Philip Bester (United States) Brendan Evans
September 27	China F8 Futures; Shanghai, China; Hard $15,000	(China) Bai Yan; 6–3, 6–2	(China) Gong Maoxin	(China) Li Zhe (Japan) Yuichi Ito	(New Zealand) José Statham (Chinese Taipei) Yi Chu-huan (Japan) Bumpei Sato (Chinese Taipei) Lee Hsin-han
September 27	China F8 Futures; Shanghai, China; Hard $15,000	(China) Gong Maoxin (China) Li Zhe; 7–6^{(7–3)}, 7–6^{(8–6)}	(Finland) Harri Heliövaara (New Zealand) José Statham	(China) Li Zhe (Japan) Yuichi Ito	(New Zealand) José Statham (Chinese Taipei) Yi Chu-huan (Japan) Bumpei Sato (Chinese Taipei) Lee Hsin-han
September 27	Portugal F4 Futures; Porto, Portugal; Clay $15,000	(France) Laurent Rochette; 7–6^{(7–4)}, 7–6^{(8–6)}	(Germany) Alexander Flock	(Spain) Gabriel Trujillo Soler (Portugal) Pedro Sousa	(France) Florian Reynet (Spain) Sergio Gutiérrez Ferrol (Netherlands) Matwé Middelkoop (Germany) Marcel Zimmermann
September 27	Portugal F4 Futures; Porto, Portugal; Clay $15,000	(Spain) Sergio Gutiérrez Ferrol (Spain) Carles Poch Gradin; 7–5, 6–3	(Australia) Allen Perel (Spain) Gabriel Trujillo Soler	(Spain) Gabriel Trujillo Soler (Portugal) Pedro Sousa	(France) Florian Reynet (Spain) Sergio Gutiérrez Ferrol (Netherlands) Matwé Middelkoop (Germany) Marcel Zimmermann
September 27	Spain F35 Futures; Martos, Spain; Hard $15,000	(Spain) Adrián Menéndez Maceiras; 7–5, 7–6^{(8–6)}	(Portugal) João Sousa	(Spain) Pedro Clar-Rosseló (Venezuela) David Souto	(Tunisia) Malek Jaziri (India) Vishnu Vardhan (Spain) Pablo Carreño Busta (Germany) Richard Waite
September 27	Spain F35 Futures; Martos, Spain; Hard $15,000	(Spain) Agustín Bojé-Ordóñez (Spain) Pablo Martín-Adalia; 3–6, 7–6^{(7–2)}, [10–8]	(India) Divij Sharan (India) Vishnu Vardhan	(Spain) Pedro Clar-Rosseló (Venezuela) David Souto	(Tunisia) Malek Jaziri (India) Vishnu Vardhan (Spain) Pablo Carreño Busta (Germany) Richard Waite
September 27	Bolivia F3 Futures; Cochabamba, Bolivia; Clay $10,000	(Argentina) Diego Sebastián Schwartzman; 6–4, 7–5	(Bolivia) Mauricio Estívariz	(Argentina) Santiago Celia (Bolivia) Mauricio Doria-Medina	(Bolivia) Hugo Dellien (Venezuela) Luis David Martínez (Argentina) Juan Ignacio Londero (Argentina) Renzo Olivo
September 27	Bolivia F3 Futures; Cochabamba, Bolivia; Clay $10,000	(Bolivia) Mauricio Doria-Medina (Bolivia) Mauricio Estívariz; 6–4, 6–4	(Peru) Mauricio Echazú (Peru) Sergio Galdós	(Argentina) Santiago Celia (Bolivia) Mauricio Doria-Medina	(Bolivia) Hugo Dellien (Venezuela) Luis David Martínez (Argentina) Juan Ignacio Londero (Argentina) Renzo Olivo
September 27	Brazil F26 Futures; Itu, Brazil; Clay $10,000	(Brazil) Fernando Romboli; 6–4, 7–5	(Sweden) Christian Lindell	(Brazil) Fabrício Neis (Brazil) Nicolas Santos	(Brazil) Rodrigo Guidolin (Brazil) Ricardo Siggia (Brazil) Tiago Slonik (Brazil) Thales Turini
September 27	Brazil F26 Futures; Itu, Brazil; Clay $10,000	(Brazil) Rodrigo-Antonio Grilli (Brazil) Fernando Romboli; 6–2, 6–3	(Brazil) Diego Matos (Brazil) Daniel Dutra da Silva	(Brazil) Fabrício Neis (Brazil) Nicolas Santos	(Brazil) Rodrigo Guidolin (Brazil) Ricardo Siggia (Brazil) Tiago Slonik (Brazil) Thales Turini
September 27	France F16 Futures; Sarreguemines, France; Carpet (indoor) $10,000	(France) Albano Olivetti; 7–6^{(7–4)}, 6–4	(France) Rudy Coco	(France) Alexandre Penaud (Germany) Holger Fischer	(Belgium) Maxime Authom (France) Pierre-Hugues Herbert (Germany) Jakob Sude (France) Mathieu Rodrigues
September 27	France F16 Futures; Sarreguemines, France; Carpet (indoor) $10,000	(France) Julien Obry (France) Albano Olivetti; 7–6^{(7–5)}, 6–4	(France) Baptiste Bayet (France) Kevin Botti	(France) Alexandre Penaud (Germany) Holger Fischer	(Belgium) Maxime Authom (France) Pierre-Hugues Herbert (Germany) Jakob Sude (France) Mathieu Rodrigues
September 27	Germany F16 Futures; Hambach, Germany; Carpet (indoor) $10,000	(Russia) Denis Matsukevich; 6–4, 6–4	(Latvia) Kārlis Lejnieks	(Czech Republic) Ladislav Chramosta (France) Antony Dupuis	(Czech Republic) Michal Schmid (Germany) Matthias Wunner (Germany) Matthias Kolbe (Germany) Marc Meigel
September 27	Germany F16 Futures; Hambach, Germany; Carpet (indoor) $10,000	(Latvia) Kārlis Lejnieks (Russia) Denis Matsukevich; 3–6, 7–6^{(7–5)}, [10–4]	(Germany) Kevin Krawietz (Germany) Marko Krickovic	(Czech Republic) Ladislav Chramosta (France) Antony Dupuis	(Czech Republic) Michal Schmid (Germany) Matthias Wunner (Germany) Matthias Kolbe (Germany) Marc Meigel
September 27	Iran F4 Futures; Tehran, Iran; Clay $10,000	(Russia) Aleksandr Lobkov; 6–3, 6–3	(Austria) Christoph Lessiak	(Russia) Ivan Nedelko (Uzbekistan) Murad Inoyatov	(Italy) Matteo Marfia (Iran) Anoosha Shahgholi (Russia) Stanislav Vovk (Germany) Navid Johannigmann
September 27	Iran F4 Futures; Tehran, Iran; Clay $10,000	(Russia) Aleksandr Lobkov (Russia) Alexander Rumyantsev; 6–4, 3–6, [10–3]	(Austria) Christoph Lessiak (Austria) Björn Propst	(Russia) Ivan Nedelko (Uzbekistan) Murad Inoyatov	(Italy) Matteo Marfia (Iran) Anoosha Shahgholi (Russia) Stanislav Vovk (Germany) Navid Johannigmann
September 27	Italy F28 Futures; Frascati, Italy; Clay $10,000	(France) Augustin Gensse; 6–1, 3–6, 6–2	(Poland) Grzegorz Panfil	(Italy) Federico Gaio (Romania) Răzvan Sabău	(Italy) Alessandro Colella (Italy) Francesco Piccari (Spain) Javier Martí (Australia) James Lemke
September 27	Italy F28 Futures; Frascati, Italy; Clay $10,000	(Spain) Óscar Burrieza (Spain) Javier Martí; 6–3, 6–2	(Italy) Massimo Capone (Italy) Marco Viola	(Italy) Federico Gaio (Romania) Răzvan Sabău	(Italy) Alessandro Colella (Italy) Francesco Piccari (Spain) Javier Martí (Australia) James Lemke
September 27	Kazakhstan F3 Futures; Astana, Kazakhstan; Hard (indoor) $10,000	(Russia) Richard Muzaev; 7–6^{(9–7)}, 3–6, 6–2	(Russia) Mikhail Elgin	(Belarus) Siarhei Betau (Belgium) Julien Dubail	(France) Antoine Tassart (Ukraine) Aleksandr Agafonov (Kazakhstan) Alexey Kedryuk (Russia) Sergei Krotiouk
September 27	Kazakhstan F3 Futures; Astana, Kazakhstan; Hard (indoor) $10,000	(Russia) Vitali Reshetnikov (Belarus) Andrei Vasilevski; 6–3, 6–2	(Russia) Sergei Krotiouk (Kazakhstan) Serizhan Yessenbekov	(Belarus) Siarhei Betau (Belgium) Julien Dubail	(France) Antoine Tassart (Ukraine) Aleksandr Agafonov (Kazakhstan) Alexey Kedryuk (Russia) Sergei Krotiouk
September 27	Turkey F9 Futures; Antalya, Turkey; Hard $10,000	(Australia) Samuel Groth; 6–3, 6–1	(Moldova) Radu Albot	(Turkey) Ergün Zorlu (Finland) Juho Paukku	(Belarus) Fedor Doudtchik (Ukraine) Artem Smirnov (Romania) Victor-Mugurel Anagnastopol (Australia) Kyle Stoker
September 27	Turkey F9 Futures; Antalya, Turkey; Hard $10,000	(Montenegro) Daniel Danilović (Finland) Juho Paukku; 6–1, 6–0	(Turkey) Barkın Yalçınkale (Turkey) Anıl Yüksel	(Turkey) Ergün Zorlu (Finland) Juho Paukku	(Belarus) Fedor Doudtchik (Ukraine) Artem Smirnov (Romania) Victor-Mugurel Anagnastopol (Australia) Kyle Stoker
September 27	USA F25 Futures; Irvine, United States; Hard $10,000	(Australia) Chris Guccione; 6–3, 6–4	(United States) Daniel Kosakowski	(Russia) Artem Sitak (Georgia (country)) Nikoloz Basilashvili	(United States) Jan-Michael Gambill (United States) Robbye Poole (United States) Sekou Bangoura (Romania) Andrei Dăescu
September 27	USA F25 Futures; Irvine, United States; Hard $10,000	(United States) Nathaniel Gorham (United States) Dennis Novikov; Default	(United Kingdom) Matthew Brooklyn (United States) Ryan Young	(Russia) Artem Sitak (Georgia (country)) Nikoloz Basilashvili	(United States) Jan-Michael Gambill (United States) Robbye Poole (United States) Sekou Bangoura (Romania) Andrei Dăescu
