= Duncan Mugabe =

Ugandan tennis player

- Full name: Duncan Kasumba Mugabe
- Country (sports): Uganda
- Born: 27 November 1990 (age 34)
- Plays: Right-handed
- Prize money: $17,926

Singles
- Highest ranking: No. 659 (30 Nov 2009)

Doubles
- Highest ranking: No. 721 (21 Sep 2015)
Medal record
All-Africa Games
Bronze medal – third place	2011 Maputo	Singles

Duncan Kasumba Mugabe (born 27 November 1990) is a Ugandan professional tennis player.

== Early life ==
Mugabe was raised in a large family in the Lugogo area of the capital Kampala. He has seven siblings, including national cricketer Danniel Ruyange and basketball player Brian Kasumba. His breakthrough win came in the ITF East Africa under 13s in 2003, after which he received a training placement in South Africa and ultimately a five-year scholarship. During this time he studied at Clapham High School in Pretoria.

== Tennis career ==
Mugabe reached his best singles world ranking of 659 in 2009. The following year he became the first Ugandan player to win the Kenyan Open for 31 years. He represented Uganda at the 2010 Commonwealth Games in Delhi, where he was beaten in the first round of the singles by Aisam-ul-Haq Qureshi. In 2011 he earned a singles bronze medal at the 2011 All-Africa Games. He was a single quarter-finalist at the 2017 Islamic Solidarity Games.

== Controversy ==
Mugabe has had an at times fractious relationship with the Uganda Tennis Association, which in 2018 banned him for six-months, citing instances of indiscipline.

== ITF Futures finals ==
=== Singles: 1 (0–1) ===
Result	W–L	Date	Tournament	Surface	Opponent	Score
Loss	0–1	Oct 2009	Kenya F1, Nairobi	Clay	(Belgium) Alexandre Folie	6–4, 6–7^{(4)}, 0–6

=== Doubles: 8 (4–4) ===
Result	W–L	Date	Tournament	Surface	Partner	Opponents	Score
Win	1–0	Sep 2008	Burundi F1, Bujumbura	Clay	(South Africa) Hendrik Coertzen	(Germany) Andre Begemann (Russia) Alexei Filenkov	7–6^{(1)}, 6–3
Loss	1–1	Sep 2009	Rwanda F1, Kigali	Clay	(Nigeria) Sunday Emmanuel	(South Africa) Hendrik Coertzen (South Africa) Ruan Roelofse	3–6, 5–7
Win	2–1	Nov 2009	Senegal F1, Dakar	Hard	(Nigeria) Clifford Enosoregbe	(Senegal) Daouda Ndiaye (Ivory Coast) Valentin Sanon	7–6^{(5)}, 3–6, [10–7]
Loss	2–2	Sep 2010	Uganda F1, Kampala	Clay	(Zimbabwe) Takanyi Garanganga	(United Kingdom) James Feaver (South Africa) Ruan Roelofse	6–7^{(8)}, 2–6
Win	3–2	Jun 2015	Mozambique F1, Maputo	Hard	(Burundi) Hassan Ndayishimiye	(South Africa) Nicolaas Scholtz (United States) Evan Song	6–3, 6–4
Loss	3–3	Jun 2015	Mozambique F2, Maputo	Hard	(Burundi) Hassan Ndayishimiye	(United States) Evan King (United States) Anderson Reed	3–6, 2–6
Loss	3–4	Sep 2015	Egypt F29, Sharm El Sheikh	Hard	(Brazil) Gustavo Guerses	(Czech Republic) Libor Salaba (Sweden) Milos Sekulic	2–6, 2–6
Win	4–4	May 2018	Uganda F4, Kampala	Clay	(Russia) Anton Chekhov	(Kenya) Ismael Changawa RuwaMzai (Kenya) Ibrahim Kibet Yego	6–2, 6–3
