= Clifford Enosoregbe =

Nigerian tennis player (born 1990)

- Country (sports): Nigeria
- Born: 19 October 1990 (age 35) Edo, Nigeria
- Plays: Right-handed
- Prize money: $12,166

Singles
- Career record: 5–4 (Davis Cup)
- Highest ranking: No. 1043 (6 Dec 2010)

Doubles
- Career record: 0–2 (Davis Cup)
- Highest ranking: No. 898 (23 Aug 2010)
Medal record
All-Africa Games
Gold medal – first place	2011 Maputo	Doubles

Clifford Enosoregbe (born 19 October 1990) is a Nigerian former professional tennis player.

Born in Edo State, Enosoregbe started out in tennis as a ballboy and developed an interest from there. He was member of the Nigeria Davis Cup team between 2013 and 2017, registering wins in five singles rubbers. At the 2011 All-Africa Games in Maputo he teamed up with Onyeka Mbanu to win a doubles gold medal in an all Nigerian final. He was the year-end Nigerian number one on multiple occasions.

== ITF Futures titles ==
=== Doubles: (1) ===
No.	Date	Tournament	Surface	Partner	Opponents	Score
1.	Nov 2009	Senegal F1, Dakar	Hard	(Uganda) Duncan Mugabe	(Senegal) Daouda Ndiaye (Ivory Coast) Valentin Sanon	7–6^{(5)}, 3–6, [10–7]
