= 2015 ATP World Tour =

Men's tennis circuit

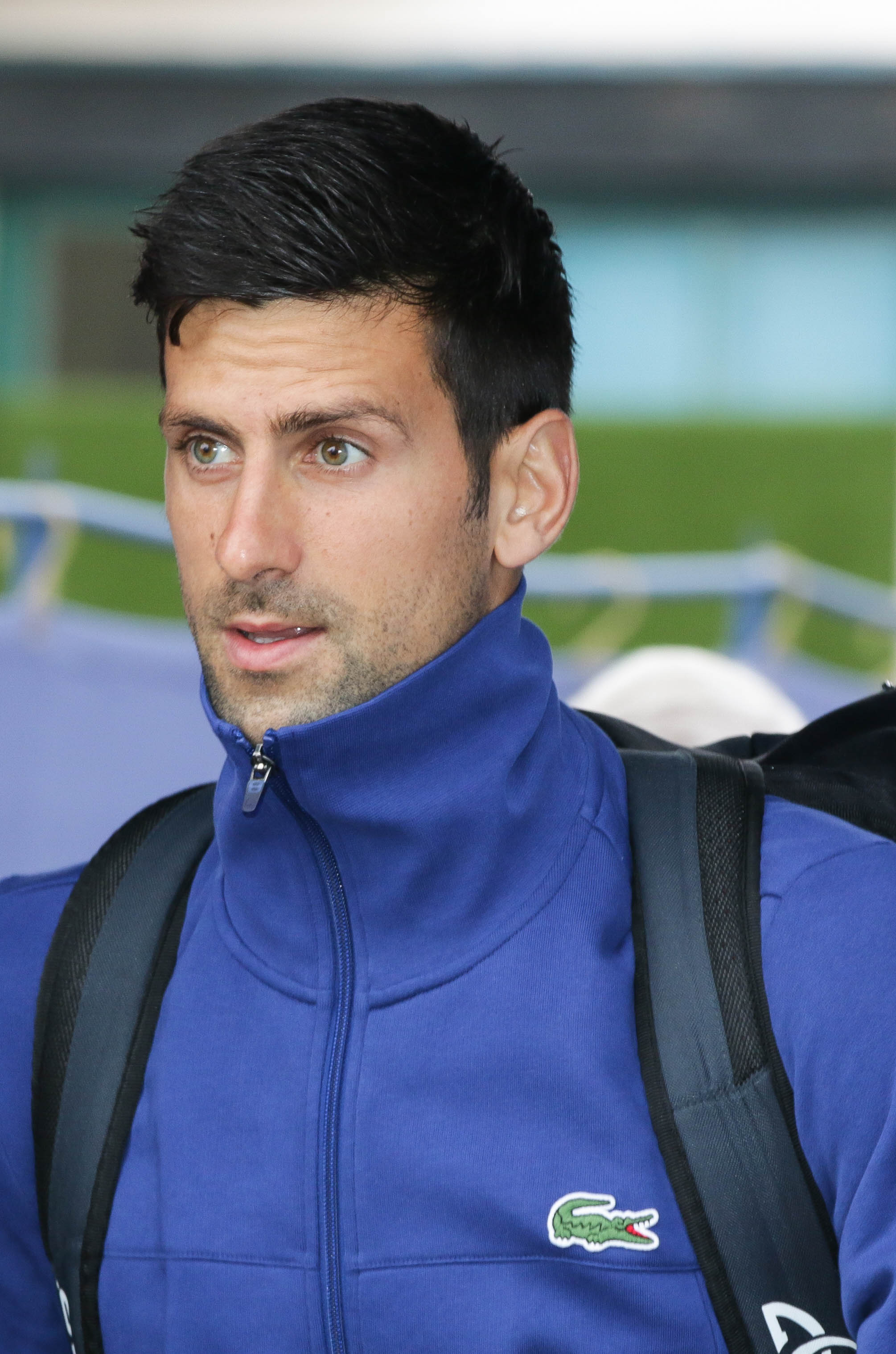
- Novak Djokovic finished the year as world No.1 for the fourth time in his career. He won eleven tournaments during the season, including three majors at the Australian Open, the Wimbledon Championships, and the US Open, as well as the ATP World Tour Finals. He also won a record six Masters 1000 titles and finished runner-up at the second major of the year, the French Open.

Details
- Duration: 4 January 2015 – 29 November 2015
- Edition: 46th
- Tournaments: 66
- Categories: Grand Slam (4); ATP World Tour Finals; ATP World Tour Masters 1000 (9); ATP World Tour 500 (13); ATP World Tour 250 (39)

Achievements (singles)
- Most titles: (Serbia) Novak Djokovic (11)
- Most finals: (Serbia) Novak Djokovic (15)
- Prize money leader: (Serbia) Novak Djokovic ($21,646,145)
- Points leader: (Serbia) Novak Djokovic (16,585)

Awards
- Player of the year: (Serbia) Novak Djokovic
- Doubles team of the year: (Netherlands) Jean-Julien Rojer (Romania) Horia Tecău
- Most improved player of the year: (South Korea) Chung Hyeon
- Star of tomorrow: (Germany) Alexander Zverev
- Comeback player of the year: (France) Benoît Paire

The 2015 ATP World Tour was the global elite men's professional tennis circuit organized by the Association of Tennis Professionals (ATP) for the 2015 tennis season. The 2015 ATP World Tour calendar comprises the Grand Slam tournaments (supervised by the International Tennis Federation), the ATP World Tour Masters 1000, the ATP World Tour 500 series, the ATP World Tour 250 series, the Davis Cup (organized by the ITF) and the ATP World Tour Finals. Also included in the 2015 calendar is the Hopman Cup, which is organized by the ITF and does not distribute ranking points.

== Schedule ==
This is the complete schedule of events on the 2015 calendar, with player progression documented from the quarterfinals stage.

Key

Grand Slam
ATP World Tour Finals
ATP World Tour Masters 1000
ATP World Tour 500
ATP World Tour 250
Team Events

=== January ===
Week	Tournament	Champions	Runners-up	Semifinalists	Quarterfinalists
5 Jan	Hopman Cup; Perth, Australia; ITF Mixed Teams Championships; Hard (i) – $1,000,000 – 8 teams (RR)	Poland; 2–1	United States	Round robin (Group A) Canada; Czech Republic; Italy	Round robin (Group B) Great Britain; France; Australia
5 Jan	Qatar Open; Doha, Qatar; ATP World Tour 250; Hard – $1,221,320 – 32S/16D; Singles – Doubles	(Spain) David Ferrer; 6–4, 7–5	(Czech Republic) Tomáš Berdych	(Croatia) Ivo Karlović (Italy) Andreas Seppi	(Serbia) Novak Djokovic (Germany) Dustin Brown (France) Richard Gasquet (Croatia) Ivan Dodig
5 Jan	Qatar Open; Doha, Qatar; ATP World Tour 250; Hard – $1,221,320 – 32S/16D; Singles – Doubles	(Argentina) Juan Mónaco (Spain) Rafael Nadal; 6–3, 6–4	(Austria) Julian Knowle (Austria) Philipp Oswald	(Croatia) Ivo Karlović (Italy) Andreas Seppi	(Serbia) Novak Djokovic (Germany) Dustin Brown (France) Richard Gasquet (Croatia) Ivan Dodig
5 Jan	Brisbane International; Brisbane, Australia; ATP World Tour 250; Hard – $494,310 – 28S/16D; Singles – Doubles	(Switzerland) Roger Federer; 6–4, 6–7^{(2–7)}, 6–4	(Canada) Milos Raonic	(Bulgaria) Grigor Dimitrov (Japan) Kei Nishikori	(Australia) James Duckworth (Slovakia) Martin Kližan (Australia) Sam Groth (Australia) Bernard Tomic
5 Jan	Brisbane International; Brisbane, Australia; ATP World Tour 250; Hard – $494,310 – 28S/16D; Singles – Doubles	(United Kingdom) Jamie Murray (Australia) John Peers; 6–3, 7–6^{(7–4)}	(Ukraine) Alexandr Dolgopolov (Japan) Kei Nishikori	(Bulgaria) Grigor Dimitrov (Japan) Kei Nishikori	(Australia) James Duckworth (Slovakia) Martin Kližan (Australia) Sam Groth (Australia) Bernard Tomic
5 Jan	Chennai Open; Chennai, India; ATP World Tour 250; Hard – $458,400 – 28S/16D; Singles – Doubles	(Switzerland) Stan Wawrinka; 6–3, 6–4	(Slovenia) Aljaž Bedene	(Belgium) David Goffin (Spain) Roberto Bautista Agut	(Luxembourg) Gilles Müller (Austria) Andreas Haider-Maurer (Chinese Taipei) Lu Yen-hsun (Spain) Guillermo García López
5 Jan	Chennai Open; Chennai, India; ATP World Tour 250; Hard – $458,400 – 28S/16D; Singles – Doubles	(Chinese Taipei) Lu Yen-hsun (United Kingdom) Jonathan Marray; 6–3, 7–6^{(7–4)}	(South Africa) Raven Klaasen (India) Leander Paes	(Belgium) David Goffin (Spain) Roberto Bautista Agut	(Luxembourg) Gilles Müller (Austria) Andreas Haider-Maurer (Chinese Taipei) Lu Yen-hsun (Spain) Guillermo García López
12 Jan	Sydney International; Sydney, Australia; ATP World Tour 250; Hard – $494,310 – 28S/16D; Singles – Doubles	(Serbia) Viktor Troicki; 6–2, 6–3	(Kazakhstan) Mikhail Kukushkin	(Argentina) Leonardo Mayer (Luxembourg) Gilles Müller	(Argentina) Juan Martín del Potro (France) Julien Benneteau (Australia) Bernard Tomic (Italy) Simone Bolelli
12 Jan	Sydney International; Sydney, Australia; ATP World Tour 250; Hard – $494,310 – 28S/16D; Singles – Doubles	(India) Rohan Bopanna (Canada) Daniel Nestor; 6–4, 7–6^{(7–5)}	(Netherlands) Jean-Julien Rojer (Romania) Horia Tecău	(Argentina) Leonardo Mayer (Luxembourg) Gilles Müller	(Argentina) Juan Martín del Potro (France) Julien Benneteau (Australia) Bernard Tomic (Italy) Simone Bolelli
12 Jan	Auckland Open; Auckland, New Zealand; ATP World Tour 250; Hard – $519,395 – 28S/16D; Singles – Doubles	(Czech Republic) Jiří Veselý; 6–3, 6–2	(France) Adrian Mannarino	(France) Lucas Pouille (South Africa) Kevin Anderson	(Spain) Albert Ramos (Colombia) Alejandro Falla (United States) Steve Johnson (United States) Donald Young
12 Jan	Auckland Open; Auckland, New Zealand; ATP World Tour 250; Hard – $519,395 – 28S/16D; Singles – Doubles	(South Africa) Raven Klaasen (India) Leander Paes; 7–6^{(7–1)}, 6–4	(United Kingdom) Dominic Inglot (Romania) Florin Mergea	(France) Lucas Pouille (South Africa) Kevin Anderson	(Spain) Albert Ramos (Colombia) Alejandro Falla (United States) Steve Johnson (United States) Donald Young
19 Jan; 26 Jan	Australian Open; Melbourne, Australia; Grand Slam; Hard – A$17,748,600; 128S/64D/32X; Singles – Doubles – Mixed doubles	(Serbia) Novak Djokovic; 7–6^{(7–5)}, 6–7^{(4–7)}, 6–3, 6–0	(United Kingdom) Andy Murray	(Switzerland) Stan Wawrinka (Czech Republic) Tomáš Berdych	(Canada) Milos Raonic (Japan) Kei Nishikori (Spain) Rafael Nadal (Australia) Nick Kyrgios
19 Jan; 26 Jan	Australian Open; Melbourne, Australia; Grand Slam; Hard – A$17,748,600; 128S/64D/32X; Singles – Doubles – Mixed doubles	(Italy) Simone Bolelli (Italy) Fabio Fognini; 6–4, 6–4	(France) Pierre-Hugues Herbert (France) Nicolas Mahut	(Switzerland) Stan Wawrinka (Czech Republic) Tomáš Berdych	(Canada) Milos Raonic (Japan) Kei Nishikori (Spain) Rafael Nadal (Australia) Nick Kyrgios
19 Jan; 26 Jan	Australian Open; Melbourne, Australia; Grand Slam; Hard – A$17,748,600; 128S/64D/32X; Singles – Doubles – Mixed doubles	(Switzerland) Martina Hingis (India) Leander Paes; 6–4, 6–3	(France) Kristina Mladenovic (Canada) Daniel Nestor	(Switzerland) Stan Wawrinka (Czech Republic) Tomáš Berdych	(Canada) Milos Raonic (Japan) Kei Nishikori (Spain) Rafael Nadal (Australia) Nick Kyrgios

=== February ===
Week	Tournament	Champions	Runners-up	Semifinalists	Quarterfinalists
2 Feb	Open Sud de France; Montpellier, France; ATP World Tour 250; Hard (i) – €494,310 – 28S/16D; Singles – Doubles	(France) Richard Gasquet; 3–0 ret.	(Poland) Jerzy Janowicz	(France) Gaël Monfils (Portugal) João Sousa	(Belgium) Steve Darcis (Uzbekistan) Denis Istomin (Germany) Philipp Kohlschreiber (France) Gilles Simon
2 Feb	Open Sud de France; Montpellier, France; ATP World Tour 250; Hard (i) – €494,310 – 28S/16D; Singles – Doubles	(New Zealand) Marcus Daniell (New Zealand) Artem Sitak; 3–6, 6–4, [16–14]	(United Kingdom) Dominic Inglot (Romania) Florin Mergea	(France) Gaël Monfils (Portugal) João Sousa	(Belgium) Steve Darcis (Uzbekistan) Denis Istomin (Germany) Philipp Kohlschreiber (France) Gilles Simon
2 Feb	Zagreb Indoors; Zagreb, Croatia; ATP World Tour 250; Hard (i) – €494,310 – 28S/16D; Singles – Doubles	(Spain) Guillermo García López; 7–6^{(7–4)}, 6–3	(Italy) Andreas Seppi	(Cyprus) Marcos Baghdatis (Spain) Marcel Granollers	(Russia) Mikhail Youzhny (Serbia) Viktor Troicki (Lithuania) Ričardas Berankis (Netherlands) Igor Sijsling
2 Feb	Zagreb Indoors; Zagreb, Croatia; ATP World Tour 250; Hard (i) – €494,310 – 28S/16D; Singles – Doubles	(Croatia) Marin Draganja (Finland) Henri Kontinen; 6–4, 6–4	(France) Fabrice Martin (India) Purav Raja	(Cyprus) Marcos Baghdatis (Spain) Marcel Granollers	(Russia) Mikhail Youzhny (Serbia) Viktor Troicki (Lithuania) Ričardas Berankis (Netherlands) Igor Sijsling
2 Feb	Ecuador Open; Quito, Ecuador; ATP World Tour 250; Clay (red) – $494,310 – 28S/16D; Singles – Doubles	(Dominican Republic) Víctor Estrella Burgos; 6–2, 6–7^{(5–7)}, 7–6^{(7–5)}	(Spain) Feliciano López	(Spain) Fernando Verdasco (Brazil) Thomaz Bellucci	(Serbia) Dušan Lajović (Italy) Paolo Lorenzi (Slovakia) Martin Kližan (Spain) Albert Montañés
2 Feb	Ecuador Open; Quito, Ecuador; ATP World Tour 250; Clay (red) – $494,310 – 28S/16D; Singles – Doubles	(Germany) Gero Kretschmer (Germany) Alexander Satschko; 7–5, 7–6^{(7–3)}	(Dominican Republic) Víctor Estrella Burgos (Brazil) João Souza	(Spain) Fernando Verdasco (Brazil) Thomaz Bellucci	(Serbia) Dušan Lajović (Italy) Paolo Lorenzi (Slovakia) Martin Kližan (Spain) Albert Montañés
9 Feb	Rotterdam Open; Rotterdam, Netherlands; ATP World Tour 500; Hard (i) – $1,890,939 – 32S/16D/4D; Singles – Doubles	(Switzerland) Stan Wawrinka; 4–6, 6–3, 6–4	(Czech Republic) Tomáš Berdych	(France) Gilles Simon (Canada) Milos Raonic	(United Kingdom) Andy Murray (France) Gaël Monfils (Luxembourg) Gilles Müller (Ukraine) Sergiy Stakhovsky
9 Feb	Rotterdam Open; Rotterdam, Netherlands; ATP World Tour 500; Hard (i) – $1,890,939 – 32S/16D/4D; Singles – Doubles	(Netherlands) Jean-Julien Rojer (Romania) Horia Tecău; 3–6, 6–3, [10–8]	(United Kingdom) Jamie Murray (Australia) John Peers	(France) Gilles Simon (Canada) Milos Raonic	(United Kingdom) Andy Murray (France) Gaël Monfils (Luxembourg) Gilles Müller (Ukraine) Sergiy Stakhovsky
9 Feb	Memphis Open; Memphis, United States; ATP World Tour 250; Hard (i) – $659,070 – 28S/16D; Singles – Doubles	(Japan) Kei Nishikori; 6–4, 6–4	(South Africa) Kevin Anderson	(United States) Sam Querrey (United States) Donald Young	(United States) Austin Krajicek (United States) John Isner (Australia) Bernard Tomic (United States) Steve Johnson
9 Feb	Memphis Open; Memphis, United States; ATP World Tour 250; Hard (i) – $659,070 – 28S/16D; Singles – Doubles	(Poland) Mariusz Fyrstenberg (Mexico) Santiago González; 5–7, 7–6^{(7–1)}, [10–8]	(New Zealand) Artem Sitak (United States) Donald Young	(United States) Sam Querrey (United States) Donald Young	(United States) Austin Krajicek (United States) John Isner (Australia) Bernard Tomic (United States) Steve Johnson
9 Feb	Brasil Open; São Paulo, Brazil; ATP World Tour 250; Clay (red) (i) – $505,655 – 28S/16D; Singles – Doubles	(Uruguay) Pablo Cuevas; 6–4, 3–6, 7–6^{(7–4)}	(Italy) Luca Vanni	(Brazil) João Souza (Colombia) Santiago Giraldo	(Serbia) Dušan Lajović (Argentina) Leonardo Mayer (Italy) Fabio Fognini (Spain) Nicolás Almagro
9 Feb	Brasil Open; São Paulo, Brazil; ATP World Tour 250; Clay (red) (i) – $505,655 – 28S/16D; Singles – Doubles	(Colombia) Juan Sebastián Cabal (Colombia) Robert Farah; 6–4, 6–2	(Italy) Paolo Lorenzi (Argentina) Diego Schwartzman	(Brazil) João Souza (Colombia) Santiago Giraldo	(Serbia) Dušan Lajović (Argentina) Leonardo Mayer (Italy) Fabio Fognini (Spain) Nicolás Almagro
16 Feb	Rio Open; Rio de Janeiro, Brazil; ATP World Tour 500; Clay (red) – $1,548,755 – 32S/16D; Singles – Doubles	(Spain) David Ferrer; 6–2, 6–3	(Italy) Fabio Fognini	(Spain) Rafael Nadal (Austria) Andreas Haider-Maurer	(Uruguay) Pablo Cuevas (Argentina) Federico Delbonis (Brazil) João Souza (Argentina) Juan Mónaco
16 Feb	Rio Open; Rio de Janeiro, Brazil; ATP World Tour 500; Clay (red) – $1,548,755 – 32S/16D; Singles – Doubles	(Slovakia) Martin Kližan (Austria) Philipp Oswald; 7–6^{(7–3)}, 6–4	(Spain) Pablo Andújar (Austria) Oliver Marach	(Spain) Rafael Nadal (Austria) Andreas Haider-Maurer	(Uruguay) Pablo Cuevas (Argentina) Federico Delbonis (Brazil) João Souza (Argentina) Juan Mónaco
16 Feb	Open 13; Marseille, France; ATP World Tour 250; Hard (i) – $747,514 – 28S/16D; Singles – Doubles	(France) Gilles Simon; 6–4, 1–6, 7–6^{(7–4)}	(France) Gaël Monfils	(Spain) Roberto Bautista Agut (Ukraine) Sergiy Stakhovsky	(Italy) Simone Bolelli (Austria) Dominic Thiem (France) Jérémy Chardy (Switzerland) Stan Wawrinka
16 Feb	Open 13; Marseille, France; ATP World Tour 250; Hard (i) – $747,514 – 28S/16D; Singles – Doubles	(Croatia) Marin Draganja (Finland) Henri Kontinen; 6–4, 3–6, [10–8]	(United Kingdom) Colin Fleming (United Kingdom) Jonathan Marray	(Spain) Roberto Bautista Agut (Ukraine) Sergiy Stakhovsky	(Italy) Simone Bolelli (Austria) Dominic Thiem (France) Jérémy Chardy (Switzerland) Stan Wawrinka
16 Feb	Delray Beach Open; Delray Beach, United States; ATP World Tour 250; Hard – $549,230 – 32S/16D; Singles – Doubles	(Croatia) Ivo Karlović; 6–3, 6–3	(United States) Donald Young	(France) Adrian Mannarino (Australia) Bernard Tomic	(Chinese Taipei) Lu Yen-hsun (United States) Steve Johnson (Ukraine) Alexandr Dolgopolov (Japan) Yoshihito Nishioka
16 Feb	Delray Beach Open; Delray Beach, United States; ATP World Tour 250; Hard – $549,230 – 32S/16D; Singles – Doubles	(United States) Bob Bryan (United States) Mike Bryan; 6–3, 3–6, [10–6]	(South Africa) Raven Klaasen (India) Leander Paes	(France) Adrian Mannarino (Australia) Bernard Tomic	(Chinese Taipei) Lu Yen-hsun (United States) Steve Johnson (Ukraine) Alexandr Dolgopolov (Japan) Yoshihito Nishioka
23 Feb	Dubai Tennis Championships; Dubai, United Arab Emirates; ATP World Tour 500; Hard – $2,503,810 – 32S/16D/4D; Singles – Doubles	(Switzerland) Roger Federer; 6–3, 7–5	(Serbia) Novak Djokovic	(Czech Republic) Tomáš Berdych (Croatia) Borna Ćorić	(Turkey) Marsel İlhan (Ukraine) Sergiy Stakhovsky (United Kingdom) Andy Murray (France) Richard Gasquet
23 Feb	Dubai Tennis Championships; Dubai, United Arab Emirates; ATP World Tour 500; Hard – $2,503,810 – 32S/16D/4D; Singles – Doubles	(India) Rohan Bopanna (Canada) Daniel Nestor; 6–4, 6–1	(Pakistan) Aisam-ul-Haq Qureshi (Serbia) Nenad Zimonjić	(Czech Republic) Tomáš Berdych (Croatia) Borna Ćorić	(Turkey) Marsel İlhan (Ukraine) Sergiy Stakhovsky (United Kingdom) Andy Murray (France) Richard Gasquet
23 Feb	Mexican Open; Acapulco, Mexico; ATP World Tour 500; Hard – $1,548,755 – 32S/16D/4D; Singles – Doubles	(Spain) David Ferrer; 6–3, 7–5	(Japan) Kei Nishikori	(South Africa) Kevin Anderson (United States) Ryan Harrison	(Ukraine) Alexandr Dolgopolov (Serbia) Viktor Troicki (Croatia) Ivo Karlović (Australia) Bernard Tomic
23 Feb	Mexican Open; Acapulco, Mexico; ATP World Tour 500; Hard – $1,548,755 – 32S/16D/4D; Singles – Doubles	(Croatia) Ivan Dodig (Brazil) Marcelo Melo; 7–6^{(7–2)}, 5–7, [10–3]	(Poland) Mariusz Fyrstenberg (Mexico) Santiago González	(South Africa) Kevin Anderson (United States) Ryan Harrison	(Ukraine) Alexandr Dolgopolov (Serbia) Viktor Troicki (Croatia) Ivo Karlović (Australia) Bernard Tomic
23 Feb	Argentina Open; Buenos Aires, Argentina; ATP World Tour 250; Clay (red) – $573,750 – 28S/16D; Singles – Doubles	(Spain) Rafael Nadal; 6–4, 6–1	(Argentina) Juan Mónaco	(Argentina) Carlos Berlocq (Spain) Nicolás Almagro	(Argentina) Federico Delbonis (Slovenia) Blaž Rola (Uruguay) Pablo Cuevas (Spain) Tommy Robredo
23 Feb	Argentina Open; Buenos Aires, Argentina; ATP World Tour 250; Clay (red) – $573,750 – 28S/16D; Singles – Doubles	(Finland) Jarkko Nieminen (Brazil) André Sá; 4–6, 6–4, [10–7]	(Spain) Pablo Andújar (Austria) Oliver Marach	(Argentina) Carlos Berlocq (Spain) Nicolás Almagro	(Argentina) Federico Delbonis (Slovenia) Blaž Rola (Uruguay) Pablo Cuevas (Spain) Tommy Robredo

=== March ===
Week	Tournament	Champions	Runners-up	Semifinalists	Quarterfinalists
2 Mar	Davis Cup First Round; Frankfurt, Germany – hard (i); Glasgow, United Kingdom – hard (i); Ostrava, Czech Republic – hard (i); Astana, Kazakhstan – hard (i); Buenos Aires, Argentina – clay (red); Kraljevo, Serbia – hard (i); Vancouver, Canada – hard (i); Liège, Belgium – hard (i)	First-round winners France 3–2; Great Britain 3–2; Australia 3–2; Kazakhstan 3–2; Argentina 3–2; Serbia 5–0; Canada 3–2; Belgium 3–2	First-round losers Germany; United States; Czech Republic; Italy; Brazil; Croatia; Japan; Switzerland		
9 Mar; 16 Mar	Indian Wells Masters; Indian Wells, United States; ATP World Tour Masters 1000; Hard – $5,381,235 – 96S/32D; Singles – Doubles	(Serbia) Novak Djokovic; 6–3, 6–7^{(5–7)}, 6–2	(Switzerland) Roger Federer	(United Kingdom) Andy Murray (Canada) Milos Raonic	(Australia) Bernard Tomic (Spain) Feliciano López (Spain) Rafael Nadal (Czech Republic) Tomáš Berdych
9 Mar; 16 Mar	Indian Wells Masters; Indian Wells, United States; ATP World Tour Masters 1000; Hard – $5,381,235 – 96S/32D; Singles – Doubles	(Canada) Vasek Pospisil (United States) Jack Sock; 6–4, 6–7^{(3–7)}, [10–7]	(Italy) Simone Bolelli (Italy) Fabio Fognini	(United Kingdom) Andy Murray (Canada) Milos Raonic	(Australia) Bernard Tomic (Spain) Feliciano López (Spain) Rafael Nadal (Czech Republic) Tomáš Berdych
23 Mar; 30 Mar	Miami Open; Key Biscayne, United States; ATP World Tour Masters 1000; Hard – $5,381,235 – 96S/48Q/32D; Singles – Doubles	(Serbia) Novak Djokovic; 7–6^{(7–3)}, 4–6, 6–0	(United Kingdom) Andy Murray	(United States) John Isner (Czech Republic) Tomáš Berdych	(Spain) David Ferrer (Japan) Kei Nishikori (Austria) Dominic Thiem (Argentina) Juan Mónaco
23 Mar; 30 Mar	Miami Open; Key Biscayne, United States; ATP World Tour Masters 1000; Hard – $5,381,235 – 96S/48Q/32D; Singles – Doubles	(United States) Bob Bryan (United States) Mike Bryan; 6–3, 1–6, [10–8]	(Canada) Vasek Pospisil (United States) Jack Sock	(United States) John Isner (Czech Republic) Tomáš Berdych	(Spain) David Ferrer (Japan) Kei Nishikori (Austria) Dominic Thiem (Argentina) Juan Mónaco

=== April ===
Week	Tournament	Champions	Runners-up	Semifinalists	Quarterfinalists
6 Apr	U.S. Men's Clay Court Championships; Houston, United States; ATP World Tour 250; Clay (maroon) – $549,230 – 28S/16D; Singles – Doubles	(United States) Jack Sock; 7–6^{(11–9)}, 7–6^{(7–2)}	(United States) Sam Querrey	(Spain) Fernando Verdasco (South Africa) Kevin Anderson	(Spain) Feliciano López (Russia) Teymuraz Gabashvili (France) Jérémy Chardy (Colombia) Santiago Giraldo
6 Apr	U.S. Men's Clay Court Championships; Houston, United States; ATP World Tour 250; Clay (maroon) – $549,230 – 28S/16D; Singles – Doubles	(Lithuania) Ričardas Berankis (Russia) Teymuraz Gabashvili; 6–4, 6–4	(Philippines) Treat Huey (United States) Scott Lipsky	(Spain) Fernando Verdasco (South Africa) Kevin Anderson	(Spain) Feliciano López (Russia) Teymuraz Gabashvili (France) Jérémy Chardy (Colombia) Santiago Giraldo
6 Apr	Grand Prix Hassan II; Casablanca, Morocco; ATP World Tour 250; Clay (red) – $583,881 – 28S/16D; Singles – Doubles	(Slovakia) Martin Kližan; 6–2, 6–2	(Spain) Daniel Gimeno Traver	(Czech Republic) Jiří Veselý (Bosnia and Herzegovina) Damir Džumhur	(Morocco) Lamine Ouahab (United Kingdom) Aljaž Bedene (Austria) Andreas Haider-Maurer (Spain) Nicolás Almagro
6 Apr	Grand Prix Hassan II; Casablanca, Morocco; ATP World Tour 250; Clay (red) – $583,881 – 28S/16D; Singles – Doubles	(Australia) Rameez Junaid (Canada) Adil Shamasdin; 3–6, 6–2, [10–7]	(India) Rohan Bopanna (Romania) Florin Mergea	(Czech Republic) Jiří Veselý (Bosnia and Herzegovina) Damir Džumhur	(Morocco) Lamine Ouahab (United Kingdom) Aljaž Bedene (Austria) Andreas Haider-Maurer (Spain) Nicolás Almagro
13 Apr	Monte-Carlo Masters; Roquebrune-Cap-Martin, France; ATP World Tour Masters 1000; Clay (red) – €3,288,530 – 56S/28Q/24D; Singles – Doubles	(Serbia) Novak Djokovic; 7–5, 4–6, 6–3	(Czech Republic) Tomáš Berdych	(Spain) Rafael Nadal (France) Gaël Monfils	(Croatia) Marin Čilić (Spain) David Ferrer (Canada) Milos Raonic (Bulgaria) Grigor Dimitrov
13 Apr	Monte-Carlo Masters; Roquebrune-Cap-Martin, France; ATP World Tour Masters 1000; Clay (red) – €3,288,530 – 56S/28Q/24D; Singles – Doubles	(United States) Bob Bryan (United States) Mike Bryan; 7–6^{(7–3)}, 6–1	(Italy) Simone Bolelli (Italy) Fabio Fognini	(Spain) Rafael Nadal (France) Gaël Monfils	(Croatia) Marin Čilić (Spain) David Ferrer (Canada) Milos Raonic (Bulgaria) Grigor Dimitrov
20 Apr	Barcelona Open; Barcelona, Spain; ATP World Tour 500; Clay (red) – $2,265,235 – 48S/28Q/16D/4D; Singles – Doubles	(Japan) Kei Nishikori; 6–4, 6–4	(Spain) Pablo Andújar	(Slovakia) Martin Kližan (Spain) David Ferrer	(Spain) Roberto Bautista Agut (Spain) Tommy Robredo (Germany) Philipp Kohlschreiber (Italy) Fabio Fognini
20 Apr	Barcelona Open; Barcelona, Spain; ATP World Tour 500; Clay (red) – $2,265,235 – 48S/28Q/16D/4D; Singles – Doubles	(Croatia) Marin Draganja (Finland) Henri Kontinen; 6–3, 6–7^{(6–8)}, [11–9]	(United Kingdom) Jamie Murray (Australia) John Peers	(Slovakia) Martin Kližan (Spain) David Ferrer	(Spain) Roberto Bautista Agut (Spain) Tommy Robredo (Germany) Philipp Kohlschreiber (Italy) Fabio Fognini
20 Apr	Romanian Open; Bucharest, Romania; ATP World Tour 250; Clay (red) – $583,881 – 28S/16D; Singles – Doubles	(Spain) Guillermo García López; 7–6^{(7–5)}, 7–6^{(13–11)}	(Czech Republic) Jiří Veselý	(Spain) Daniel Gimeno Traver (France) Gaël Monfils	(France) Gilles Simon (Croatia) Ivo Karlović (Czech Republic) Lukáš Rosol (Italy) Simone Bolelli
20 Apr	Romanian Open; Bucharest, Romania; ATP World Tour 250; Clay (red) – $583,881 – 28S/16D; Singles – Doubles	(Romania) Marius Copil (Romania) Adrian Ungur; 3–6, 7–5, [17–15]	(United States) Nicholas Monroe (New Zealand) Artem Sitak	(Spain) Daniel Gimeno Traver (France) Gaël Monfils	(France) Gilles Simon (Croatia) Ivo Karlović (Czech Republic) Lukáš Rosol (Italy) Simone Bolelli
27 Apr	Bavarian International Tennis Championships; Munich, Germany; ATP World Tour 250; Clay (red) – $583,881 – 28S/16D; Singles – Doubles	(United Kingdom) Andy Murray; 7–6^{(7–4)}, 5–7, 7–6^{(7–4)}	(Germany) Philipp Kohlschreiber	(Spain) Roberto Bautista Agut (Austria) Gerald Melzer	(Czech Republic) Lukáš Rosol (Dominican Republic) Víctor Estrella Burgos (Belgium) David Goffin (Austria) Dominic Thiem
27 Apr	Bavarian International Tennis Championships; Munich, Germany; ATP World Tour 250; Clay (red) – $583,881 – 28S/16D; Singles – Doubles	(Austria) Alexander Peya (Brazil) Bruno Soares; 4–6, 6–1, [10–5]	(Germany) Alexander Zverev (Germany) Mischa Zverev	(Spain) Roberto Bautista Agut (Austria) Gerald Melzer	(Czech Republic) Lukáš Rosol (Dominican Republic) Víctor Estrella Burgos (Belgium) David Goffin (Austria) Dominic Thiem
27 Apr	Estoril Open; Cascais, Portugal; ATP World Tour 250; Clay (red) – €439,405 – 28S/16D; Singles – Doubles	(France) Richard Gasquet; 6–3, 6–2	(Australia) Nick Kyrgios	(Spain) Pablo Carreño Busta (Spain) Guillermo García López	(Netherlands) Robin Haase (Luxembourg) Gilles Müller (Spain) Nicolás Almagro (Croatia) Borna Ćorić
27 Apr	Estoril Open; Cascais, Portugal; ATP World Tour 250; Clay (red) – €439,405 – 28S/16D; Singles – Doubles	(Philippines) Treat Huey (United States) Scott Lipsky; 6–1, 6–4	(Spain) Marc López (Spain) David Marrero	(Spain) Pablo Carreño Busta (Spain) Guillermo García López	(Netherlands) Robin Haase (Luxembourg) Gilles Müller (Spain) Nicolás Almagro (Croatia) Borna Ćorić
27 Apr	Istanbul Open; Istanbul, Turkey; ATP World Tour 250; Clay (red) – €439,405 – 28S/16D; Singles – Doubles	(Switzerland) Roger Federer; 6–3, 7–6^{(13–11)}	(Uruguay) Pablo Cuevas	(Argentina) Diego Schwartzman (Bulgaria) Grigor Dimitrov	(Spain) Daniel Gimeno Traver (Colombia) Santiago Giraldo (Brazil) Thomaz Bellucci (Croatia) Ivan Dodig
27 Apr	Istanbul Open; Istanbul, Turkey; ATP World Tour 250; Clay (red) – €439,405 – 28S/16D; Singles – Doubles	(Moldova) Radu Albot (Serbia) Dušan Lajović; 6–4, 7–6^{(7–2)}	(Sweden) Robert Lindstedt (Austria) Jürgen Melzer	(Argentina) Diego Schwartzman (Bulgaria) Grigor Dimitrov	(Spain) Daniel Gimeno Traver (Colombia) Santiago Giraldo (Brazil) Thomaz Bellucci (Croatia) Ivan Dodig

=== May ===
Week	Tournament	Champions	Runners-up	Semifinalists	Quarterfinalists
4 May	Madrid Open; Madrid, Spain; ATP World Tour Masters 1000; Clay (red) – €4,185,405 – 56S/28Q/24D; Singles – Doubles	(United Kingdom) Andy Murray; 6–3, 6–2	(Spain) Rafael Nadal	(Czech Republic) Tomáš Berdych (Japan) Kei Nishikori	(United States) John Isner (Bulgaria) Grigor Dimitrov (Spain) David Ferrer (Canada) Milos Raonic
4 May	Madrid Open; Madrid, Spain; ATP World Tour Masters 1000; Clay (red) – €4,185,405 – 56S/28Q/24D; Singles – Doubles	(India) Rohan Bopanna (Romania) Florin Mergea; 6–2, 6–7^{(5–7)}, [11–9]	(Poland) Marcin Matkowski (Serbia) Nenad Zimonjić	(Czech Republic) Tomáš Berdych (Japan) Kei Nishikori	(United States) John Isner (Bulgaria) Grigor Dimitrov (Spain) David Ferrer (Canada) Milos Raonic
11 May	Italian Open; Rome, Italy; ATP World Tour Masters 1000; Clay (red) – €3,288,530 – 56S/28Q/24D; Singles – Doubles	(Serbia) Novak Djokovic; 6–4, 6–3	(Switzerland) Roger Federer	(Spain) David Ferrer (Switzerland) Stan Wawrinka	(Japan) Kei Nishikori (Belgium) David Goffin (Spain) Rafael Nadal (Czech Republic) Tomáš Berdych
11 May	Italian Open; Rome, Italy; ATP World Tour Masters 1000; Clay (red) – €3,288,530 – 56S/28Q/24D; Singles – Doubles	(Uruguay) Pablo Cuevas (Spain) David Marrero; 6–4, 7–5	(Spain) Marcel Granollers (Spain) Marc López	(Spain) David Ferrer (Switzerland) Stan Wawrinka	(Japan) Kei Nishikori (Belgium) David Goffin (Spain) Rafael Nadal (Czech Republic) Tomáš Berdych
18 May	Open de Nice Côte d'Azur; Nice, France; ATP World Tour 250; Clay (red) – $583,881 – 28S/16D; Singles – Doubles	(Austria) Dominic Thiem; 6–7^{(8–10)}, 7–5, 7–6^{(7–2)}	(Argentina) Leonardo Mayer	(Croatia) Borna Ćorić (United States) John Isner	(Australia) James Duckworth (Argentina) Juan Mónaco (Latvia) Ernests Gulbis (Serbia) Dušan Lajović
18 May	Open de Nice Côte d'Azur; Nice, France; ATP World Tour 250; Clay (red) – $583,881 – 28S/16D; Singles – Doubles	(Croatia) Mate Pavić (New Zealand) Michael Venus; 7–6^{(7–4)}, 2–6, [10–8]	(Netherlands) Jean-Julien Rojer (Romania) Horia Tecău	(Croatia) Borna Ćorić (United States) John Isner	(Australia) James Duckworth (Argentina) Juan Mónaco (Latvia) Ernests Gulbis (Serbia) Dušan Lajović
18 May	Geneva Open; Geneva, Switzerland; ATP World Tour 250; Clay (red) – €439,405 – 28S/16D; Singles – Doubles	(Brazil) Thomaz Bellucci; 7–6^{(7–4)}, 6–4	(Portugal) João Sousa	(Argentina) Federico Delbonis (Colombia) Santiago Giraldo	(Switzerland) Stan Wawrinka (Spain) Pablo Andújar (Spain) Albert Ramos Viñolas (Croatia) Marin Čilić
18 May	Geneva Open; Geneva, Switzerland; ATP World Tour 250; Clay (red) – €439,405 – 28S/16D; Singles – Doubles	(Colombia) Juan Sebastián Cabal (Colombia) Robert Farah; 7–5, 4–6, [10–7]	(South Africa) Raven Klaasen (Chinese Taipei) Lu Yen-hsun	(Argentina) Federico Delbonis (Colombia) Santiago Giraldo	(Switzerland) Stan Wawrinka (Spain) Pablo Andújar (Spain) Albert Ramos Viñolas (Croatia) Marin Čilić
25 May; 1 Jun	French Open; Paris, France; Grand Slam; Clay (red) – €13,008,000; 128S/64D/32X; Singles – Doubles – Mixed doubles	(Switzerland) Stan Wawrinka; 4–6, 6–4, 6–3, 6–4	(Serbia) Novak Djokovic	(United Kingdom) Andy Murray (France) Jo-Wilfried Tsonga	(Spain) Rafael Nadal (Spain) David Ferrer (Japan) Kei Nishikori (Switzerland) Roger Federer
25 May; 1 Jun	French Open; Paris, France; Grand Slam; Clay (red) – €13,008,000; 128S/64D/32X; Singles – Doubles – Mixed doubles	(Croatia) Ivan Dodig (Brazil) Marcelo Melo; 6–7^{(5–7)}, 7–6^{(7–5)}, 7–5	(United States) Bob Bryan (United States) Mike Bryan	(United Kingdom) Andy Murray (France) Jo-Wilfried Tsonga	(Spain) Rafael Nadal (Spain) David Ferrer (Japan) Kei Nishikori (Switzerland) Roger Federer
25 May; 1 Jun	French Open; Paris, France; Grand Slam; Clay (red) – €13,008,000; 128S/64D/32X; Singles – Doubles – Mixed doubles	(United States) Bethanie Mattek-Sands (United States) Mike Bryan; 7–6^{(7–3)}, 6–1	(Czech Republic) Lucie Hradecká (Poland) Marcin Matkowski	(United Kingdom) Andy Murray (France) Jo-Wilfried Tsonga	(Spain) Rafael Nadal (Spain) David Ferrer (Japan) Kei Nishikori (Switzerland) Roger Federer

=== June ===
Week	Tournament	Champions	Runners-up	Semifinalists	Quarterfinalists
8 Jun	Rosmalen Grass Court Championships 's-Hertogenbosch, Netherlands; ATP World Tour 250; Grass – €604,155 – 28S/16D; Singles – Doubles	(France) Nicolas Mahut; 7–6^{(7–1)}, 6–1	(Belgium) David Goffin	(Netherlands) Robin Haase (Luxembourg) Gilles Müller	(Croatia) Ivo Karlović (France) Adrian Mannarino (Romania) Marius Copil (Ukraine) Illya Marchenko
8 Jun	Rosmalen Grass Court Championships 's-Hertogenbosch, Netherlands; ATP World Tour 250; Grass – €604,155 – 28S/16D; Singles – Doubles	(Croatia) Ivo Karlović (Poland) Łukasz Kubot; 6–2, 7–6^{(11–9)}	(France) Pierre-Hugues Herbert (France) Nicolas Mahut	(Netherlands) Robin Haase (Luxembourg) Gilles Müller	(Croatia) Ivo Karlović (France) Adrian Mannarino (Romania) Marius Copil (Ukraine) Illya Marchenko
8 Jun	MercedesCup; Stuttgart, Germany; ATP World Tour 250; Grass – €574,965 – 28S/16D; Singles – Doubles	(Spain) Rafael Nadal; 7–6^{(7–3)}, 6–3	(Serbia) Viktor Troicki	(France) Gaël Monfils (Croatia) Marin Čilić	(Australia) Bernard Tomic (Germany) Philipp Kohlschreiber (Australia) Sam Groth (Germany) Mischa Zverev
8 Jun	MercedesCup; Stuttgart, Germany; ATP World Tour 250; Grass – €574,965 – 28S/16D; Singles – Doubles	(India) Rohan Bopanna (Romania) Florin Mergea; 5–7, 6–2, [10–7]	(Austria) Alexander Peya (Brazil) Bruno Soares	(France) Gaël Monfils (Croatia) Marin Čilić	(Australia) Bernard Tomic (Germany) Philipp Kohlschreiber (Australia) Sam Groth (Germany) Mischa Zverev
15 Jun	Halle Open; Halle, Germany; ATP World Tour 500; Grass – €1,696,645 – 32S/16D/4D; Singles – Doubles	(Switzerland) Roger Federer; 7–6^{(7–1)}, 6–4	(Italy) Andreas Seppi	(Croatia) Ivo Karlović (Japan) Kei Nishikori	(Germany) Florian Mayer (Czech Republic) Tomáš Berdych (France) Gaël Monfils (Poland) Jerzy Janowicz
15 Jun	Halle Open; Halle, Germany; ATP World Tour 500; Grass – €1,696,645 – 32S/16D/4D; Singles – Doubles	(South Africa) Raven Klaasen (United States) Rajeev Ram; 7–6^{(7–5)}, 6–2	(India) Rohan Bopanna (Romania) Florin Mergea	(Croatia) Ivo Karlović (Japan) Kei Nishikori	(Germany) Florian Mayer (Czech Republic) Tomáš Berdych (France) Gaël Monfils (Poland) Jerzy Janowicz
15 Jun	Queen's Club Championships; London, United Kingdom; ATP World Tour 500; Grass – €1,696,645 – 32S/16D/4D; Singles – Doubles	(United Kingdom) Andy Murray; 6–3, 6–4	(South Africa) Kevin Anderson	(Serbia) Viktor Troicki (France) Gilles Simon	(Luxembourg) Gilles Müller (United States) John Isner (Canada) Milos Raonic (Spain) Guillermo García López
15 Jun	Queen's Club Championships; London, United Kingdom; ATP World Tour 500; Grass – €1,696,645 – 32S/16D/4D; Singles – Doubles	(France) Pierre-Hugues Herbert (France) Nicolas Mahut; 6–2, 6–2	(Poland) Marcin Matkowski (Serbia) Nenad Zimonjić	(Serbia) Viktor Troicki (France) Gilles Simon	(Luxembourg) Gilles Müller (United States) John Isner (Canada) Milos Raonic (Spain) Guillermo García López
22 Jun	Nottingham Open; Nottingham, United Kingdom; ATP World Tour 250; Grass – €644,065 – 48S/16D; Singles – Doubles	(Uzbekistan) Denis Istomin; 7–6^{(7–1)}, 7–6^{(8–6)}	(United States) Sam Querrey	(Cyprus) Marcos Baghdatis (Ukraine) Alexandr Dolgopolov	(Italy) Simone Bolelli (Argentina) Leonardo Mayer (Chinese Taipei) Lu Yen-hsun (France) Gilles Simon
22 Jun	Nottingham Open; Nottingham, United Kingdom; ATP World Tour 250; Grass – €644,065 – 48S/16D; Singles – Doubles	(Australia) Chris Guccione (Brazil) André Sá; 6–2, 7–5	(Uruguay) Pablo Cuevas (Spain) David Marrero	(Cyprus) Marcos Baghdatis (Ukraine) Alexandr Dolgopolov	(Italy) Simone Bolelli (Argentina) Leonardo Mayer (Chinese Taipei) Lu Yen-hsun (France) Gilles Simon
29 Jun; 6 Jul	Wimbledon; London, United Kingdom; Grand Slam; Grass – £12,568,000; 128S/64D/48X; Singles – Doubles – Mixed doubles	(Serbia) Novak Djokovic; 7–6^{(7–1)}, 6–7^{(10–12)}, 6–4, 6–3	(Switzerland) Roger Federer	(France) Richard Gasquet (United Kingdom) Andy Murray	(Croatia) Marin Čilić (Switzerland) Stan Wawrinka (Canada) Vasek Pospisil (France) Gilles Simon
29 Jun; 6 Jul	Wimbledon; London, United Kingdom; Grand Slam; Grass – £12,568,000; 128S/64D/48X; Singles – Doubles – Mixed doubles	(Netherlands) Jean-Julien Rojer (Romania) Horia Tecău; 7–6^{(7–5)}, 6–4, 6–4	(United Kingdom) Jamie Murray (Australia) John Peers	(France) Richard Gasquet (United Kingdom) Andy Murray	(Croatia) Marin Čilić (Switzerland) Stan Wawrinka (Canada) Vasek Pospisil (France) Gilles Simon
29 Jun; 6 Jul	Wimbledon; London, United Kingdom; Grand Slam; Grass – £12,568,000; 128S/64D/48X; Singles – Doubles – Mixed doubles	(Switzerland) Martina Hingis (India) Leander Paes; 6–1, 6–1	(Hungary) Tímea Babos (Austria) Alexander Peya	(France) Richard Gasquet (United Kingdom) Andy Murray	(Croatia) Marin Čilić (Switzerland) Stan Wawrinka (Canada) Vasek Pospisil (France) Gilles Simon

=== July ===
Week	Tournament	Champions	Runners-up	Semifinalists	Quarterfinalists
13 Jul	Hall of Fame Tennis Championships; Newport, United States; ATP World Tour 250; Grass – $549,230 – 32S/16D; Singles – Doubles	(United States) Rajeev Ram; 7–6^{(7–5)}, 5–7, 7–6^{(7–2)}	(Croatia) Ivo Karlović	(Australia) John-Patrick Smith (United States) Jack Sock	(France) Adrian Mannarino (Japan) Tatsuma Ito (Czech Republic) Jan Hernych (Germany) Dustin Brown
13 Jul	Hall of Fame Tennis Championships; Newport, United States; ATP World Tour 250; Grass – $549,230 – 32S/16D; Singles – Doubles	(United Kingdom) Jonathan Marray (Pakistan) Aisam-ul-Haq Qureshi; 4–6, 6–3, [10–8]	(United States) Nicholas Monroe (Croatia) Mate Pavić	(Australia) John-Patrick Smith (United States) Jack Sock	(France) Adrian Mannarino (Japan) Tatsuma Ito (Czech Republic) Jan Hernych (Germany) Dustin Brown
13 Jul	Davis Cup Quarterfinals; London, United Kingdom – grass Darwin, Australia – grass Buenos Aires, Argentina – clay (i); Middelkerke, Belgium – clay	Quarterfinals winners Great Britain 3–1; Australia 3–2; Argentina 4–1; Belgium 5–0	Quarterfinals losers France; Kazakhstan; Serbia; Canada		
20 Jul	Colombia Open; Bogotá, Colombia; ATP World Tour 250; Hard – $768,915 – 28S/29Q/16D; Singles – Doubles	(Australia) Bernard Tomic; 6–1, 3–6, 6–2	(France) Adrian Mannarino	(Croatia) Ivo Karlović (Germany) Michael Berrer	(Czech Republic) Radek Štěpánek (Tunisia) Malek Jaziri (Dominican Republic) Víctor Estrella Burgos (Japan) Tatsuma Ito
20 Jul	Colombia Open; Bogotá, Colombia; ATP World Tour 250; Hard – $768,915 – 28S/29Q/16D; Singles – Doubles	(France) Édouard Roger-Vasselin (Czech Republic) Radek Štěpánek; 7–5, 6–3	(Croatia) Mate Pavić (New Zealand) Michael Venus	(Croatia) Ivo Karlović (Germany) Michael Berrer	(Czech Republic) Radek Štěpánek (Tunisia) Malek Jaziri (Dominican Republic) Víctor Estrella Burgos (Japan) Tatsuma Ito
20 Jul	Swedish Open; Båstad, Sweden; ATP World Tour 250; Clay (red) – €494,310 – 28S/16D; Singles – Doubles	(France) Benoît Paire; 7–6^{(9–7)}, 6–3	(Spain) Tommy Robredo	(Uruguay) Pablo Cuevas (Germany) Alexander Zverev	(Uzbekistan) Denis Istomin (Belgium) Steve Darcis (Brazil) Thomaz Bellucci (France) Paul-Henri Mathieu
20 Jul	Swedish Open; Båstad, Sweden; ATP World Tour 250; Clay (red) – €494,310 – 28S/16D; Singles – Doubles	(France) Jérémy Chardy (Poland) Łukasz Kubot; 6–7^{(6–8)}, 6–3, [10–8]	(Colombia) Juan Sebastián Cabal (Colombia) Robert Farah	(Uruguay) Pablo Cuevas (Germany) Alexander Zverev	(Uzbekistan) Denis Istomin (Belgium) Steve Darcis (Brazil) Thomaz Bellucci (France) Paul-Henri Mathieu
20 Jul	Croatia Open; Umag, Croatia; ATP World Tour 250; Clay (red) – €494,310 – 28S/16D; Singles – Doubles	(Austria) Dominic Thiem; 6–4, 6–1	(Portugal) João Sousa	(France) Gaël Monfils (Spain) Roberto Bautista Agut	(Germany) Philipp Kohlschreiber (Austria) Andreas Haider-Maurer (Italy) Fabio Fognini (Croatia) Borna Ćorić
20 Jul	Croatia Open; Umag, Croatia; ATP World Tour 250; Clay (red) – €494,310 – 28S/16D; Singles – Doubles	(Argentina) Máximo González (Brazil) André Sá; 4–6, 6–3, [10–5]	(Poland) Mariusz Fyrstenberg (Mexico) Santiago González	(France) Gaël Monfils (Spain) Roberto Bautista Agut	(Germany) Philipp Kohlschreiber (Austria) Andreas Haider-Maurer (Italy) Fabio Fognini (Croatia) Borna Ćorić
27 Jul	German Open; Hamburg, Germany; ATP World Tour 500; Clay (red) – €1,407,960 – 32S/16D/4D; Singles – Doubles	(Spain) Rafael Nadal; 7–5, 7–5	(Italy) Fabio Fognini	(Italy) Andreas Seppi (France) Lucas Pouille	(Uruguay) Pablo Cuevas (Italy) Simone Bolelli (United Kingdom) Aljaž Bedene (France) Benoît Paire
27 Jul	German Open; Hamburg, Germany; ATP World Tour 500; Clay (red) – €1,407,960 – 32S/16D/4D; Singles – Doubles	(United Kingdom) Jamie Murray (Australia) John Peers; 2–6, 6–3, [10–8]	(Colombia) Juan Sebastián Cabal (Colombia) Robert Farah	(Italy) Andreas Seppi (France) Lucas Pouille	(Uruguay) Pablo Cuevas (Italy) Simone Bolelli (United Kingdom) Aljaž Bedene (France) Benoît Paire
27 Jul	Suisse Open; Gstaad, Switzerland; ATP World Tour 250; Clay (red) – €494,310 – 28S/16D; Singles – Doubles	(Austria) Dominic Thiem; 7–5, 6–2	(Belgium) David Goffin	(Brazil) Thomaz Bellucci (Spain) Feliciano López	(Portugal) João Sousa (Spain) Pablo Andújar (Spain) Pablo Carreño Busta (Colombia) Santiago Giraldo
27 Jul	Suisse Open; Gstaad, Switzerland; ATP World Tour 250; Clay (red) – €494,310 – 28S/16D; Singles – Doubles	(Belarus) Aliaksandr Bury (Uzbekistan) Denis Istomin; 3–6, 6–2, [10–5]	(Austria) Oliver Marach (Pakistan) Aisam-ul-Haq Qureshi	(Brazil) Thomaz Bellucci (Spain) Feliciano López	(Portugal) João Sousa (Spain) Pablo Andújar (Spain) Pablo Carreño Busta (Colombia) Santiago Giraldo
27 Jul	Atlanta Open; Atlanta, United States; ATP World Tour 250; Hard – $659,070 – 28S/16D; Singles – Doubles	(United States) John Isner; 6–3, 6–3	(Cyprus) Marcos Baghdatis	(United States) Denis Kudla (Luxembourg) Gilles Müller	(Lithuania) Ričardas Berankis (Israel) Dudi Sela (Japan) Go Soeda (Canada) Vasek Pospisil
27 Jul	Atlanta Open; Atlanta, United States; ATP World Tour 250; Hard – $659,070 – 28S/16D; Singles – Doubles	(United States) Bob Bryan (United States) Mike Bryan; 4–6, 7–6^{(7–2)}, [10–4]	(United Kingdom) Colin Fleming (Luxembourg) Gilles Müller	(United States) Denis Kudla (Luxembourg) Gilles Müller	(Lithuania) Ričardas Berankis (Israel) Dudi Sela (Japan) Go Soeda (Canada) Vasek Pospisil

=== August ===
Week	Tournament	Champions	Runners-up	Semifinalists	Quarterfinalists
3 Aug	Washington Open; Washington, D.C., United States; ATP World Tour 500; Hard – $1,753,020 – 48S/16D/4D; Singles – Doubles	(Japan) Kei Nishikori; 4–6, 6–4, 6–4	(United States) John Isner	(United States) Steve Johnson (Croatia) Marin Čilić	(Lithuania) Ričardas Berankis (United States) Jack Sock (Germany) Alexander Zverev (Australia) Sam Groth
3 Aug	Washington Open; Washington, D.C., United States; ATP World Tour 500; Hard – $1,753,020 – 48S/16D/4D; Singles – Doubles	(United States) Bob Bryan (United States) Mike Bryan; 6–4, 6–2	(Croatia) Ivan Dodig (Brazil) Marcelo Melo	(United States) Steve Johnson (Croatia) Marin Čilić	(Lithuania) Ričardas Berankis (United States) Jack Sock (Germany) Alexander Zverev (Australia) Sam Groth
3 Aug	Austrian Open Kitzbühel; Kitzbühel, Austria; ATP World Tour 250; Clay (red) – €494,310 – 28S/16D; Singles – Doubles	(Germany) Philipp Kohlschreiber; 2–6, 6–2, 6–2	(France) Paul-Henri Mathieu	(Austria) Dominic Thiem (Spain) Nicolás Almagro	(Spain) Albert Montañés (Italy) Fabio Fognini (Argentina) Federico Delbonis (Serbia) Dušan Lajović
3 Aug	Austrian Open Kitzbühel; Kitzbühel, Austria; ATP World Tour 250; Clay (red) – €494,310 – 28S/16D; Singles – Doubles	(Spain) Nicolás Almagro (Argentina) Carlos Berlocq; 5–7, 6–3, [11–9]	(Netherlands) Robin Haase (Finland) Henri Kontinen	(Austria) Dominic Thiem (Spain) Nicolás Almagro	(Spain) Albert Montañés (Italy) Fabio Fognini (Argentina) Federico Delbonis (Serbia) Dušan Lajović
10 Aug	Canadian Open; Montreal, Canada; ATP World Tour Masters 1000; Hard – $3,578,490 – 56S/24D; Singles – Doubles	(United Kingdom) Andy Murray; 6–4, 4–6, 6–3	(Serbia) Novak Djokovic	(France) Jérémy Chardy (Japan) Kei Nishikori	(Latvia) Ernests Gulbis (United States) John Isner (Spain) Rafael Nadal (France) Jo-Wilfried Tsonga
10 Aug	Canadian Open; Montreal, Canada; ATP World Tour Masters 1000; Hard – $3,578,490 – 56S/24D; Singles – Doubles	(United States) Bob Bryan (United States) Mike Bryan; 7–6^{(7–5)}, 3–6, [10–6]	(Canada) Daniel Nestor (France) Édouard Roger-Vasselin	(France) Jérémy Chardy (Japan) Kei Nishikori	(Latvia) Ernests Gulbis (United States) John Isner (Spain) Rafael Nadal (France) Jo-Wilfried Tsonga
17 Aug	Cincinnati Masters; Mason, United States; ATP World Tour Masters 1000; Hard – $4,457,065 – 56S/28Q/24D; Singles – Doubles	(Switzerland) Roger Federer; 7–6^{(7–1)}, 6–3	(Serbia) Novak Djokovic	(Ukraine) Alexandr Dolgopolov (United Kingdom) Andy Murray	(Switzerland) Stan Wawrinka (Czech Republic) Tomáš Berdych (France) Richard Gasquet (Spain) Feliciano López
17 Aug	Cincinnati Masters; Mason, United States; ATP World Tour Masters 1000; Hard – $4,457,065 – 56S/28Q/24D; Singles – Doubles	(Canada) Daniel Nestor (France) Édouard Roger-Vasselin; 6–2, 6–2	(Poland) Marcin Matkowski (Serbia) Nenad Zimonjić	(Ukraine) Alexandr Dolgopolov (United Kingdom) Andy Murray	(Switzerland) Stan Wawrinka (Czech Republic) Tomáš Berdych (France) Richard Gasquet (Spain) Feliciano López
24 Aug	Winston-Salem Open; Winston-Salem, United States; ATP World Tour 250; Hard – $695,515 – 48S/16D; Singles – Doubles	(South Africa) Kevin Anderson; 6–4, 7–5	(France) Pierre-Hugues Herbert	(United States) Steve Johnson (Tunisia) Malek Jaziri	(Spain) Pablo Carreño (Chinese Taipei) Lu Yen-hsun (Brazil) Thomaz Bellucci (Croatia) Borna Ćorić
24 Aug	Winston-Salem Open; Winston-Salem, United States; ATP World Tour 250; Hard – $695,515 – 48S/16D; Singles – Doubles	(United Kingdom) Dominic Inglot (Sweden) Robert Lindstedt; 6–2, 6–4	(United States) Eric Butorac (United States) Scott Lipsky	(United States) Steve Johnson (Tunisia) Malek Jaziri	(Spain) Pablo Carreño (Chinese Taipei) Lu Yen-hsun (Brazil) Thomaz Bellucci (Croatia) Borna Ćorić
31 Aug; 7 Sep	US Open; New York City, United States; Grand Slam; Hard – $19,852,700; 128S/64D/32X; Singles – Doubles – Mixed doubles	(Serbia) Novak Djokovic; 6–4, 5–7, 6–4, 6–4	(Switzerland) Roger Federer	(Croatia) Marin Čilić (Switzerland) Stan Wawrinka	(Spain) Feliciano López (France) Jo-Wilfried Tsonga (South Africa) Kevin Anderson (France) Richard Gasquet
31 Aug; 7 Sep	US Open; New York City, United States; Grand Slam; Hard – $19,852,700; 128S/64D/32X; Singles – Doubles – Mixed doubles	(France) Pierre-Hugues Herbert (France) Nicolas Mahut; 6–4, 6–4	(United Kingdom) Jamie Murray (Australia) John Peers	(Croatia) Marin Čilić (Switzerland) Stan Wawrinka	(Spain) Feliciano López (France) Jo-Wilfried Tsonga (South Africa) Kevin Anderson (France) Richard Gasquet
31 Aug; 7 Sep	US Open; New York City, United States; Grand Slam; Hard – $19,852,700; 128S/64D/32X; Singles – Doubles – Mixed doubles	(Switzerland) Martina Hingis (India) Leander Paes; 6–4, 3–6, [10–7]	(United States) Bethanie Mattek-Sands (United States) Sam Querrey	(Croatia) Marin Čilić (Switzerland) Stan Wawrinka	(Spain) Feliciano López (France) Jo-Wilfried Tsonga (South Africa) Kevin Anderson (France) Richard Gasquet

=== September ===
Week	Tournament	Champions	Runners-up	Semifinalists	Quarterfinalists
14 Sep	Davis Cup Semifinals; Glasgow, United Kingdom – hard (i); Brussels, Belgium – hard (i)	Semifinals winners Great Britain 3–2; Belgium 3–2	Semifinals losers Australia; Argentina		
21 Sep	Moselle Open; Metz, France; ATP World Tour 250; Hard (i) – €494,310 – 28S/16D; Singles – Doubles	(France) Jo-Wilfried Tsonga; 7–6^{(7–5)}, 1–6, 6–2	(France) Gilles Simon	(Germany) Philipp Kohlschreiber (Slovakia) Martin Kližan	(Switzerland) Stan Wawrinka (France) Nicolas Mahut (Spain) Guillermo García López (Luxembourg) Gilles Müller
21 Sep	Moselle Open; Metz, France; ATP World Tour 250; Hard (i) – €494,310 – 28S/16D; Singles – Doubles	(Poland) Łukasz Kubot (France) Édouard Roger-Vasselin; 2–6, 6–3, [10–7]	(France) Pierre-Hugues Herbert (France) Nicolas Mahut	(Germany) Philipp Kohlschreiber (Slovakia) Martin Kližan	(Switzerland) Stan Wawrinka (France) Nicolas Mahut (Spain) Guillermo García López (Luxembourg) Gilles Müller
21 Sep	St. Petersburg Open; St. Petersburg, Russia; ATP World Tour 250; Hard (i) – $1,091,000 – 28S/16D; Singles – Doubles	(Canada) Milos Raonic; 6–3, 3–6, 6–3	(Portugal) João Sousa	(Austria) Dominic Thiem (Spain) Roberto Bautista Agut	(Italy) Simone Bolelli (Uzbekistan) Denis Istomin (France) Lucas Pouille (Spain) Tommy Robredo
21 Sep	St. Petersburg Open; St. Petersburg, Russia; ATP World Tour 250; Hard (i) – $1,091,000 – 28S/16D; Singles – Doubles	(Philippines) Treat Huey (Finland) Henri Kontinen; 7–5, 6–3	(Austria) Julian Knowle (Austria) Alexander Peya	(Austria) Dominic Thiem (Spain) Roberto Bautista Agut	(Italy) Simone Bolelli (Uzbekistan) Denis Istomin (France) Lucas Pouille (Spain) Tommy Robredo
28 Sep	Shenzhen Open; Shenzhen, China; ATP World Tour 250; Hard – $668,945 – 28S/23Q/16D; Singles – Doubles	(Czech Republic) Tomáš Berdych; 6–3, 7–6^{(9–7)}	(Spain) Guillermo García López	(Spain) Tommy Robredo (Croatia) Marin Čilić	(Czech Republic) Jiří Veselý (Italy) Simone Bolelli (France) Adrian Mannarino (South Korea) Chung Hyeon
28 Sep	Shenzhen Open; Shenzhen, China; ATP World Tour 250; Hard – $668,945 – 28S/23Q/16D; Singles – Doubles	(Israel) Jonathan Erlich (United Kingdom) Colin Fleming; 6–1, 6–7^{(3–7)}, [10–6]	(Australia) Chris Guccione (Brazil) André Sá	(Spain) Tommy Robredo (Croatia) Marin Čilić	(Czech Republic) Jiří Veselý (Italy) Simone Bolelli (France) Adrian Mannarino (South Korea) Chung Hyeon
28 Sep	Malaysian Open; Kuala Lumpur, Malaysia; ATP World Tour 250; Hard (i) – $1,041,540 – 28S/16D; Singles – Doubles	(Spain) David Ferrer; 7–5, 7–5	(Spain) Feliciano López	(Germany) Benjamin Becker (Australia) Nick Kyrgios	(Kazakhstan) Mikhail Kukushkin (Bulgaria) Grigor Dimitrov (Croatia) Ivo Karlović (Canada) Vasek Pospisil
28 Sep	Malaysian Open; Kuala Lumpur, Malaysia; ATP World Tour 250; Hard (i) – $1,041,540 – 28S/16D; Singles – Doubles	(Philippines) Treat Huey (Finland) Henri Kontinen; 7–6^{(7–4)}, 6–2	(South Africa) Raven Klaasen (United States) Rajeev Ram	(Germany) Benjamin Becker (Australia) Nick Kyrgios	(Kazakhstan) Mikhail Kukushkin (Bulgaria) Grigor Dimitrov (Croatia) Ivo Karlović (Canada) Vasek Pospisil

=== October ===
Week	Tournament	Champions	Runners-up	Semifinalists	Quarterfinalists
5 Oct	China Open; Beijing, China; ATP World Tour 500; Hard – $3,944,715 – 32S/16D/4D; Singles – Doubles	(Serbia) Novak Djokovic; 6–2, 6–2	(Spain) Rafael Nadal	(Spain) David Ferrer (Italy) Fabio Fognini	(United States) John Isner (Chinese Taipei) Lu Yen-hsun (United States) Jack Sock (Uruguay) Pablo Cuevas
5 Oct	China Open; Beijing, China; ATP World Tour 500; Hard – $3,944,715 – 32S/16D/4D; Singles – Doubles	(Canada) Vasek Pospisil (United States) Jack Sock; 3–6, 6–3, [10–6]	(Canada) Daniel Nestor (France) Édouard Roger-Vasselin	(Spain) David Ferrer (Italy) Fabio Fognini	(United States) John Isner (Chinese Taipei) Lu Yen-hsun (United States) Jack Sock (Uruguay) Pablo Cuevas
5 Oct	Japan Open; Tokyo, Japan; ATP World Tour 500; Hard – $1,397,250 – 32S/16D/4D; Singles – Doubles	(Switzerland) Stan Wawrinka; 6–2, 6–4	(France) Benoît Paire	(Luxembourg) Gilles Müller (Japan) Kei Nishikori	(United States) Austin Krajicek (France) Gilles Simon (Australia) Nick Kyrgios (Croatia) Marin Čilić
5 Oct	Japan Open; Tokyo, Japan; ATP World Tour 500; Hard – $1,397,250 – 32S/16D/4D; Singles – Doubles	(South Africa) Raven Klaasen (Brazil) Marcelo Melo; 7–6^{(7–5)}, 3–6, [10–7]	(Colombia) Juan Sebastián Cabal (Colombia) Robert Farah	(Luxembourg) Gilles Müller (Japan) Kei Nishikori	(United States) Austin Krajicek (France) Gilles Simon (Australia) Nick Kyrgios (Croatia) Marin Čilić
12 Oct	Shanghai Masters; Shanghai, China; ATP World Tour Masters 1000; Hard – $4,783,320 – 56S/28Q/24D; Singles – Doubles	(Serbia) Novak Djokovic; 6–2, 6–4	(France) Jo-Wilfried Tsonga	(United Kingdom) Andy Murray (Spain) Rafael Nadal	(Australia) Bernard Tomic (Czech Republic) Tomáš Berdych (Switzerland) Stan Wawrinka (South Africa) Kevin Anderson
12 Oct	Shanghai Masters; Shanghai, China; ATP World Tour Masters 1000; Hard – $4,783,320 – 56S/28Q/24D; Singles – Doubles	(South Africa) Raven Klaasen (Brazil) Marcelo Melo; 6–3, 6–3	(Italy) Simone Bolelli (Italy) Fabio Fognini	(United Kingdom) Andy Murray (Spain) Rafael Nadal	(Australia) Bernard Tomic (Czech Republic) Tomáš Berdych (Switzerland) Stan Wawrinka (South Africa) Kevin Anderson
19 Oct	Vienna Open; Vienna, Austria; ATP World Tour 500; Hard (i) – €2,324,045 – 32S/16D/4D; Singles – Doubles	(Spain) David Ferrer; 4–6, 6–4, 7–5	(United States) Steve Johnson	(France) Gaël Monfils (Latvia) Ernests Gulbis	(Italy) Fabio Fognini (Czech Republic) Lukáš Rosol (Croatia) Ivo Karlović (South Africa) Kevin Anderson
19 Oct	Vienna Open; Vienna, Austria; ATP World Tour 500; Hard (i) – €2,324,045 – 32S/16D/4D; Singles – Doubles	(Poland) Łukasz Kubot (Brazil) Marcelo Melo; 4–6, 7–6^{(7–3)}, [10–6]	(United Kingdom) Jamie Murray (Australia) John Peers	(France) Gaël Monfils (Latvia) Ernests Gulbis	(Italy) Fabio Fognini (Czech Republic) Lukáš Rosol (Croatia) Ivo Karlović (South Africa) Kevin Anderson
19 Oct	Kremlin Cup; Moscow, Russia; ATP World Tour 250; Hard (i) – $771,525 – 28S/16D; Singles – Doubles	(Croatia) Marin Čilić; 6–4, 6–4	(Spain) Roberto Bautista Agut	(Russia) Evgeny Donskoy (Germany) Philipp Kohlschreiber	(Russia) Andrey Kuznetsov (Russia) Teymuraz Gabashvili (Netherlands) Robin Haase (France) Lucas Pouille
19 Oct	Kremlin Cup; Moscow, Russia; ATP World Tour 250; Hard (i) – $771,525 – 28S/16D; Singles – Doubles	(Russia) Andrey Rublev (Russia) Dmitry Tursunov; 2–6, 6–1, [10–6]	(Moldova) Radu Albot (Czech Republic) František Čermák	(Russia) Evgeny Donskoy (Germany) Philipp Kohlschreiber	(Russia) Andrey Kuznetsov (Russia) Teymuraz Gabashvili (Netherlands) Robin Haase (France) Lucas Pouille
19 Oct	Stockholm Open; Stockholm, Sweden; ATP World Tour 250; Hard (i) – €604,155 – 28S/16D; Singles – Doubles	(Czech Republic) Tomáš Berdych; 7–6^{(7–1)}, 6–2	(United States) Jack Sock	(Cyprus) Marcos Baghdatis (France) Richard Gasquet	(Bulgaria) Grigor Dimitrov (Luxembourg) Gilles Müller (France) Gilles Simon (France) Jérémy Chardy
19 Oct	Stockholm Open; Stockholm, Sweden; ATP World Tour 250; Hard (i) – €604,155 – 28S/16D; Singles – Doubles	(United States) Nicholas Monroe (United States) Jack Sock; 7–5, 6–2	(Croatia) Mate Pavić (New Zealand) Michael Venus	(Cyprus) Marcos Baghdatis (France) Richard Gasquet	(Bulgaria) Grigor Dimitrov (Luxembourg) Gilles Müller (France) Gilles Simon (France) Jérémy Chardy
26 Oct	Swiss Indoors; Basel, Switzerland; ATP World Tour 500; Hard (i) – €2,022,300 – 32S/16D/4D; Singles – Doubles	(Switzerland) Roger Federer; 6–3, 5–7, 6–3	(Spain) Rafael Nadal	(United States) Jack Sock (France) Richard Gasquet	(Belgium) David Goffin (United States) Donald Young (Croatia) Marin Čilić (Croatia) Ivo Karlović
26 Oct	Swiss Indoors; Basel, Switzerland; ATP World Tour 500; Hard (i) – €2,022,300 – 32S/16D/4D; Singles – Doubles	(Austria) Alexander Peya (Brazil) Bruno Soares; 7–5, 7–5	(United Kingdom) Jamie Murray (Australia) John Peers	(United States) Jack Sock (France) Richard Gasquet	(Belgium) David Goffin (United States) Donald Young (Croatia) Marin Čilić (Croatia) Ivo Karlović
26 Oct	Valencia Open; Valencia, Spain; ATP World Tour 250; Hard (i) – €604,155 – 28S/16D; Singles – Doubles	(Portugal) João Sousa; 3–6, 6–3, 6–4	(Spain) Roberto Bautista Agut	(Canada) Vasek Pospisil (United States) Steve Johnson	(Germany) Daniel Brands (Uruguay) Pablo Cuevas (Germany) Mischa Zverev (Spain) Guillermo García López
26 Oct	Valencia Open; Valencia, Spain; ATP World Tour 250; Hard (i) – €604,155 – 28S/16D; Singles – Doubles	(United States) Eric Butorac (United States) Scott Lipsky; 7–6^{(7–4)}, 6–3	(Spain) Feliciano López (Belarus) Max Mirnyi	(Canada) Vasek Pospisil (United States) Steve Johnson	(Germany) Daniel Brands (Uruguay) Pablo Cuevas (Germany) Mischa Zverev (Spain) Guillermo García López

=== November ===
Week	Tournament	Champions	Runners-up	Semifinalists	Quarterfinalists
2 Nov	Paris Masters; Paris, France; ATP World Tour Masters 1000; Hard (i) – €3,830,295 – 48S/24D; Singles – Doubles	(Serbia) Novak Djokovic; 6–2, 6–4	(United Kingdom) Andy Murray	(Switzerland) Stan Wawrinka (Spain) David Ferrer	(Czech Republic) Tomáš Berdych (Spain) Rafael Nadal (United States) John Isner (France) Richard Gasquet
2 Nov	Paris Masters; Paris, France; ATP World Tour Masters 1000; Hard (i) – €3,830,295 – 48S/24D; Singles – Doubles	(Croatia) Ivan Dodig (Brazil) Marcelo Melo; 2–6, 6–3, [10–5]	(Canada) Vasek Pospisil (United States) Jack Sock	(Switzerland) Stan Wawrinka (Spain) David Ferrer	(Czech Republic) Tomáš Berdych (Spain) Rafael Nadal (United States) John Isner (France) Richard Gasquet
9 Nov	No tournaments scheduled.				
16 Nov	ATP World Tour Finals; London, United Kingdom; ATP World Tour Finals; Hard (i) – $7,000,000 – 8S/8D (RR); Singles – Doubles	(Serbia) Novak Djokovic; 6–3, 6–4	(Switzerland) Roger Federer	(Switzerland) Stan Wawrinka (Spain) Rafael Nadal	Round Robin (Japan) Kei Nishikori (Czech Republic) Tomáš Berdych (United Kingdom) Andy Murray (Spain) David Ferrer
16 Nov	ATP World Tour Finals; London, United Kingdom; ATP World Tour Finals; Hard (i) – $7,000,000 – 8S/8D (RR); Singles – Doubles	(Netherlands) Jean-Julien Rojer (Romania) Horia Tecău; 6–4, 6–3	(India) Rohan Bopanna (Romania) Florin Mergea	(Switzerland) Stan Wawrinka (Spain) Rafael Nadal	Round Robin (Japan) Kei Nishikori (Czech Republic) Tomáš Berdych (United Kingdom) Andy Murray (Spain) David Ferrer
23 Nov	Davis Cup Final; Ghent, Belgium – clay (i)	Great Britain; 3–1	Belgium		

== Statistical information ==
These tables present the number of singles (S), doubles (D), and mixed doubles (X) titles won by each player and each nation during the season, within all the tournament categories of the 2015 ATP World Tour: the Grand Slam tournaments, the ATP World Tour Finals, the ATP World Tour Masters 1000, the ATP World Tour 500 series, and the ATP World Tour 250 series. The players/nations are sorted by:

1. Total number of titles (a doubles title won by two players representing the same nation counts as only one win for the nation);
2. Cumulated importance of those titles (one Grand Slam win equalling two Masters 1000 wins, one ATP World Tour Finals win equalling one-and-a-half Masters 1000 win, one Masters 1000 win equalling two 500 events wins, one 500 event win equalling two 250 events wins);
3. A singles > doubles > mixed doubles hierarchy;
4. Alphabetical order (by family names for players).

=== Key ===
Grand Slam
ATP World Tour Finals
ATP World Tour Masters 1000
ATP World Tour 500
ATP World Tour 250

=== Titles won by player ===
Total	Player	Grand Slam			ATP Finals		Masters 1000		Tour 500		Tour 250		Total		
Total	Player	S	D	X	S	D	S	D	S	D	S	D	S	D	X
11	Novak Djokovic (SRB)	● ● ●			●		● ● ● ● ● ●		●				11	0	0
7	Mike Bryan (USA)			●				● ● ●		●		● ●	0	6	1
6	Marcelo Melo (BRA)		●					● ●		● ● ●			0	6	0
6	Bob Bryan (USA)							● ● ●		●		● ●	0	6	0
6	Roger Federer (SUI)						●		● ● ●		● ●		6	0	0
5	David Ferrer (ESP)								● ● ●		● ●		5	0	0
5	Henri Kontinen (FIN)									●		● ● ● ●	0	5	0
4	Leander Paes (IND)			● ● ●								●	0	1	3
4	Stan Wawrinka (SUI)	●							● ●		●		4	0	0
4	Andy Murray (GBR)						● ●		●		●		4	0	0
4	Raven Klaasen (RSA)							●		● ●		●	0	4	0
4	Jack Sock (USA)							●		●	●	●	1	3	0
4	Rohan Bopanna (IND)							●		●		● ●	0	4	0
4	Rafael Nadal (ESP)								●		● ●	●	3	1	0
4	Łukasz Kubot (POL)									●		● ● ●	0	4	0
3	Jean-Julien Rojer (NED)		●			●				●			0	3	0
3	Horia Tecău (ROU)		●			●				●			0	3	0
3	Ivan Dodig (CRO)		●					●		●			0	3	0
3	Nicolas Mahut (FRA)		●							●	●		1	2	0
3	Daniel Nestor (CAN)							●		●		●	0	3	0
3	Édouard Roger-Vasselin (FRA)							●				● ●	0	3	0
3	Kei Nishikori (JPN)								● ●		●		3	0	0
3	Marin Draganja (CRO)									●		● ●	0	3	0
3	Dominic Thiem (AUT)										● ● ●		3	0	0
3	Treat Huey (PHI)											● ● ●	0	3	0
3	André Sá (BRA)											● ● ●	0	3	0
2	Pierre-Hugues Herbert (FRA)		●							●			0	2	0
2	Vasek Pospisil (CAN)							●		●			0	2	0
2	Pablo Cuevas (URU)							●			●		1	1	0
2	Florin Mergea (ROU)							●				●	0	2	0
2	Martin Kližan (SVK)									●	●		1	1	0
2	Jamie Murray (GBR)									●		●	0	2	0
2	John Peers (AUS)									●		●	0	2	0
2	Alexander Peya (AUT)									●		●	0	2	0
2	Bruno Soares (BRA)									●		●	0	2	0
2	Tomáš Berdych (CZE)										● ●		2	0	0
2	Guillermo García López (ESP)										● ●		2	0	0
2	Richard Gasquet (FRA)										● ●		2	0	0
2	Denis Istomin (UZB)										●	●	1	1	0
2	Ivo Karlović (CRO)										●	●	1	1	0
2	Juan Sebastián Cabal (COL)											● ●	0	2	0
2	Robert Farah (COL)											● ●	0	2	0
2	Scott Lipsky (USA)											● ●	0	2	0
2	Jonathan Marray (GBR)											● ●	0	2	0
1	Simone Bolelli (ITA)		●										0	1	0
1	Fabio Fognini (ITA)		●										0	1	0
1	David Marrero (ESP)							●					0	1	0
1	Philipp Oswald (AUT)									●			0	1	0
1	Kevin Anderson (RSA)										●		1	0	0
1	Thomaz Bellucci (BRA)										●		1	0	0
1	Marin Čilić (CRO)										●		1	0	0
1	John Isner (USA)										●		1	0	0
1	Víctor Estrella Burgos (DOM)										●		1	0	0
1	Philipp Kohlschreiber (GER)										●		1	0	0
1	Benoît Paire (FRA)										●		1	0	0
1	Rajeev Ram (USA)										●		1	0	0
1	Gilles Simon (FRA)										●		1	0	0
1	João Sousa (POR)										●		1	0	0
1	Bernard Tomic (AUS)										●		1	0	0
1	Viktor Troicki (SRB)										●		1	0	0
1	Jo-Wilfried Tsonga (FRA)										●		1	0	0
1	Jiří Veselý (CZE)										●		1	0	0
1	Milos Raonic (CAN)										●		1	0	0
1	Radu Albot (MDA)											●	0	1	0
1	Nicolás Almagro (ESP)											●	0	1	0
1	Ričardas Berankis (LTU)											●	0	1	0
1	Carlos Berlocq (ARG)											●	0	1	0
1	Aliaksandr Bury (BLR)											●	0	1	0
1	Eric Butorac (USA)											●	0	1	0
1	Jérémy Chardy (FRA)											●	0	1	0
1	Marius Copil (ROU)											●	0	1	0
1	Marcus Daniell (NZL)											●	0	1	0
1	Jonathan Erlich (ISR)											●	0	1	0
1	Colin Fleming (GBR)											●	0	1	0
1	Mariusz Fyrstenberg (POL)											●	0	1	0
1	Teymuraz Gabashvili (RUS)											●	0	1	0
1	Máximo González (ARG)											●	0	1	0
1	Santiago González (MEX)											●	0	1	0
1	Chris Guccione (AUS)											●	0	1	0
1	Dominic Inglot (GBR)											●	0	1	0
1	Rameez Junaid (AUS)											●	0	1	0
1	Gero Kretschmer (GER)											●	0	1	0
1	Dušan Lajović (SRB)											●	0	1	0
1	Robert Lindstedt (SWE)											●	0	1	0
1	Lu Yen-hsun (TPE)											●	0	1	0
1	Juan Mónaco (ARG)											●	0	1	0
1	Nicholas Monroe (USA)											●	0	1	0
1	Jarkko Nieminen (FIN)											●	0	1	0
1	Mate Pavić (CRO)											●	0	1	0
1	Aisam-ul-Haq Qureshi (PAK)											●	0	1	0
1	Andrey Rublev (RUS)											●	0	1	0
1	Alexander Satschko (GER)											●	0	1	0
1	Adil Shamasdin (CAN)											●	0	1	0
1	Artem Sitak (NZL)											●	0	1	0
1	Radek Štepánek (CZE)											●	0	1	0
1	Dmitry Tursunov (RUS)											●	0	1	0
1	Adrian Ungur (ROU)											●	0	1	0
1	Michael Venus (NZL)											●	0	1	0

=== Titles won by nation ===
Total	Nation	Grand Slam			ATP Finals		Masters 1000		Tour 500		Tour 250		Total		
Total	Nation	S	D	X	S	D	S	D	S	D	S	D	S	D	X
14	United States (USA)			1				4		2	2	5	2	11	1
13	Serbia (SRB)	3			1		6		1		1	1	12	1	0
13	Spain (ESP)							1	4		6	2	10	3	0
12	Brazil (BRA)		1					2		4	1	4	1	11	0
12	France (FRA)		1					1		1	6	3	6	6	0
10	Switzerland (SUI)	1					1		5		3		10	0	0
10	Croatia (CRO)		1					1		2	2	4	2	8	0
10	Great Britain (GBR)						2		1	1	1	5	4	6	0
8	India (IND)			3				1		1		3	0	5	3
7	Canada (CAN)							2		2	1	2	1	6	0
6	Romania (ROU)		1			1		1		1		2	0	6	0
6	Austria (AUT)									2	3	1	3	3	0
6	Finland (FIN)									1		5	0	6	0
5	South Africa (RSA)							1		2	1	1	1	4	0
5	Australia (AUS)									1	1	3	1	4	0
5	Poland (POL)									1		4	0	5	0
4	Czech Republic (CZE)										3	1	3	1	0
3	Netherlands (NED)		1			1				1			0	3	0
3	Japan (JPN)								2		1		3	0	0
3	Germany (GER)										1	2	1	2	0
3	Argentina (ARG)											3	0	3	0
3	Philippines (PHI)											3	0	3	0
2	Uruguay (URU)							1			1		1	1	0
2	Slovakia (SVK)									1	1		1	1	0
2	Uzbekistan (UZB)										1	1	1	1	0
2	Colombia (COL)											2	0	2	0
2	New Zealand (NZL)											2	0	2	0
2	Russia (RUS)											2	0	2	0
1	Italy (ITA)		1										0	1	0
1	Dominican Republic (DOM)										1		1	0	0
1	Portugal (POR)										1		1	0	0
1	Belarus (BLR)											1	0	1	0
1	Chinese Taipei (TPE)											1	0	1	0
1	Israel (ISR)											1	0	1	0
1	Lithuania (LTU)											1	0	1	0
1	Mexico (MEX)											1	0	1	0
1	Moldova (MDA)											1	0	1	0
1	Pakistan (PAK)											1	0	1	0
1	Sweden (SWE)											1	0	1	0

=== Titles information ===
The following players won their first main circuit title in singles, doubles, or mixed doubles:

Singles
- (Czech Republic) Jiří Veselý – Auckland (draw)
- (Dominican Republic) Víctor Estrella Burgos – Quito (draw)
- (United States) Jack Sock – Houston (draw)
- (Austria) Dominic Thiem – Nice (draw)
- (Uzbekistan) Denis Istomin – Nottingham (draw)
- (France) Benoît Paire – Båstad (draw)

Doubles
- (Germany) Gero Kretschmer – Quito (draw)
- (Germany) Alexander Satschko – Quito (draw)
- (Australia) Rameez Junaid – Casablanca (draw)
- (Lithuania) Ričardas Berankis – Houston (draw)
- (Russia) Teymuraz Gabashvili – Houston (draw)
- (Romania) Marius Copil – Bucharest (draw)
- (Romania) Adrian Ungur – Bucharest (draw)
- (Moldova) Radu Albot – Istanbul (draw)
- (Serbia) Dušan Lajović – Istanbul (draw)
- (Croatia) Mate Pavić – Nice (draw)
- (New Zealand) Michael Venus – Nice (draw)
- (Belarus) Aliaksandr Bury – Gstaad (draw)
- (Spain) Nicolás Almagro – Kitzbühel (draw)
- (Russia) Andrey Rublev – Moscow (draw)

The following players defended a main circuit title in singles, doubles, or mixed doubles:

Singles
- (Switzerland) Stan Wawrinka – Chennai (draw)
- (Japan) Kei Nishikori – Memphis (draw), Barcelona (draw)
- (Switzerland) Roger Federer – Dubai (draw), Halle (draw), Cincinnati (draw), Basel (draw)
- (Serbia) Novak Djokovic – Indian Wells (draw), Miami (draw), Rome (draw), Wimbledon (draw), Beijing (draw), Paris (draw), ATP World Tour Finals (draw)
- (Australia) Bernard Tomic – Bogotá (draw)
- (United States) John Isner – Atlanta (draw)
- (Croatia) Marin Čilić – Moscow (draw)
- (Czech Republic) Tomáš Berdych – Stockholm (draw)

Doubles
- (Canada) Daniel Nestor – Sydney (draw)
- (United States) Bob Bryan – Delray Beach (draw), Miami (draw), Monte Carlo (draw)
- (United States) Mike Bryan – Delray Beach (draw), Miami (draw), Monte Carlo (draw)
- (India) Rohan Bopanna – Dubai (draw)

=== Top 10 entry ===
The following players entered the top 10 for the first time in their careers:

Singles
- (South Africa) Kevin Anderson (enters at no. 10 on 12 October)

Doubles
- (Canada) Vasek Pospisil (enters at no. 8 on 23 March)
- (United States) Jack Sock (enters at no. 10 on 23 March)
- (Italy) Simone Bolelli (enters at no. 10 on 8 June)
- (Italy) Fabio Fognini (enters at no. 9 on 8 June)
- (Romania) Florin Mergea (enters at no. 7 on 13 July)
- (Australia) John Peers (enters at no. 7 on 14 September)
- (United Kingdom) Jamie Murray (enters at no. 8 on 14 September)
- (France) Pierre-Hugues Herbert (enters at no. 10 on 14 September)

== ATP rankings ==
These are the ATP rankings of the top 20 singles players, doubles players, and the top 10 doubles teams on the ATP Tour, at the current date of the 2015 season.

=== Singles ===
Singles race rankings final rankings
#	Player	Points	Tours
1	Novak Djokovic (SRB)	15,285	17
2	Andy Murray (GBR)	8,470	19
3	Roger Federer (SUI)	7,340	17
4	Stan Wawrinka (SUI)	6,500	22
5	Rafael Nadal (ESP)	4,630	22
6	Tomáš Berdych (CZE)	4,620	21
7	David Ferrer (ESP)	4,305	19
8	Kei Nishikori (JPN)	4,035	20
9	Richard Gasquet (FRA)	2,850	21
10	Jo-Wilfried Tsonga (FRA)	2,635	18
11	John Isner (USA)	2,495	25
12	Kevin Anderson (RSA)	2,475	25
13	Marin Čilić (CRO)	2,405	22
14	Milos Raonic (CAN)	2,170	20
15	Gilles Simon (FRA)	2,145	24
16	David Goffin (BEL)	1,805	26
17	Feliciano López (ESP)	1,690	26
18	Bernard Tomic (AUS)	1,675	29
19	Benoît Paire (FRA)	1,633	30
20	Dominic Thiem (AUT)	1,600	30

Player competed at the 2015 ATP World Tour Finals

Year-end rankings 2015 (28 December 2015)
#	Player	Points	#Trn	'14 Rk	High	Low	'14→'15
1	Novak Djokovic (SRB)	16,585	18	1	1	1	Steady
2	Andy Murray (GBR)	8,945	20	6	2	6	▲4
3	Roger Federer (SUI)	8,265	18	2	2	3	▼1
4	Stan Wawrinka (SUI)	6,865	23	4	4	10	Steady
5	Rafael Nadal (ESP)	5,230	23	3	3	10	▼2
6	Tomáš Berdych (CZE)	4,620	22	7	4	9	▲1
7	David Ferrer (ESP)	4,305	20	10	7	10	▲3
8	Kei Nishikori (JPN)	4,235	21	5	4	8	▼3
9	Richard Gasquet (FRA)	2,850	20	26	9	28	▲17
10	Jo-Wilfried Tsonga (FRA)	2,635	18	12	10	24	▲2
11	John Isner (USA)	2,495	25	19	11	24	▲8
12	Kevin Anderson (RSA)	2,475	25	16	10	17	▲4
13	Marin Čilić (CRO)	2,405	22	9	8	14	▼4
14	Milos Raonic (CAN)	2,170	20	8	4	14	▼6
15	Gilles Simon (FRA)	2,145	24	21	10	21	▲6
16	David Goffin (BEL)	1,880	26	22	14	22	▲6
17	Feliciano López (ESP)	1,690	26	14	12	23	▼3
18	Bernard Tomic (AUS)	1,675	29	56	18	71	▲38
19	Benoît Paire (FRA)	1,633	30	118	19	149	▲99
20	Dominic Thiem (AUT)	1,600	30	39	18	52	▲19

==== Number 1 ranking ====
Holder	Date gained	Date forfeited
Novak Djokovic (SRB)	Year end 2014	Year end 2015

=== Doubles ===
ATP Doubles Team Rankings, Final rankings
#	Team	Points	Tours
1	Jean-Julien Rojer (NED); Horia Tecău (ROU)	7,810	24
2	Bob Bryan (USA); Mike Bryan (USA)	6,865	22
3	Ivan Dodig (CRO); Marcelo Melo (BRA)	6,540	14
4	Jamie Murray (GBR); John Peers (AUS)	5,835	27
5	Simone Bolelli (ITA); Fabio Fognini (ITA)	5,095	16
6	Pierre-Hugues Herbert (FRA); Nicolas Mahut (FRA)	4,965	16
7	Rohan Bopanna (IND); Florin Mergea (ROU)	4,435	16
8	Marcin Matkowski (POL); Nenad Zimonjić (SRB)	4,290	19
9	Vasek Pospisil (CAN); Jack Sock (USA)	3,420	12
10	Alexander Peya (AUT); Bruno Soares (BRA)	3,420	26

Team competed at the 2015 ATP World Tour Finals

Year-end rankings 2015 (28 December 2015)
#	Player	Points	#Trn	14' Rank	High	Low	'14→'15
1	Marcelo Melo (BRA)	8,900	22	6	1	7	▲5
2	Horia Tecău (ROU)	7,420	24	16T	2	16T	▲12
3	Jean-Julien Rojer (NED)	7,420	26	16T	3	16T	▲13
4	Bob Bryan (USA)	6,770	22	1T	1	4	▼3
5	Mike Bryan (USA)	6,770	23	1T	1T	5	▼4
6	Ivan Dodig (CRO)	6,685	19	12	4	12	▲6
7	Jamie Murray (GBR)	5,840	27	41	7	41	▲34
8	John Peers (AUS)	5,545	28	42	7	42	▲34
9	Rohan Bopanna (IND)	5,530	27	30	9	30	▲21
10	Fabio Fognini (ITA)	5,365	22	57	7	55	▲47
11	Florin Mergea (ROU)	5,290	25	24	7	24	▲13
12	Nicolas Mahut (FRA)	5,285	21	19	9	23	▲7
13	Simone Bolelli (ITA)	5,230	22	143	8	142	▲130
14	Pierre-Hugues Herbert (FRA)	5,005	17	63	8	64	▲49
15	Nenad Zimonjić (SRB)	4,590	26	3	3	15	▼12
16	Marcin Matkowski (POL)	4,290	27	27	7	28	▲11
17	Édouard Roger-Vasselin (FRA)	4,200	20	7	6	26	▼10
18	Daniel Nestor (CAN)	4,180	27	4	4	28	▼14
19	Jack Sock (USA)	4,090	16	15	6	24	▼4
20	Raven Klaasen (RSA)	3,660	28	20	19	30	Steady

==== Number 1 ranking ====
Holder	Date gained	Date forfeited
Mike Bryan (USA)	Year end 2014	25 October 2015
Bob Bryan (USA)	Year end 2014	1 November 2015
Marcelo Melo (BRA)	2 November 2015	Year end 2015

== Prize money leaders ==
#	Player	Year-to-date
1	Novak Djokovic (SRB)	$21,646,145
2	Roger Federer (SUI)	$8,692,017
3	Andy Murray (GBR)	$8,245,230
4	Stan Wawrinka (SUI)	$6,547,877
5	Rafael Nadal (ESP)	$4,508,888
6	Tomáš Berdych (CZE)	$3,755,082
7	David Ferrer (ESP)	$3,622,755
8	Kei Nishikori (JPN)	$3,302,055
9	Richard Gasquet (FRA)	$2,521,835
10	Jo-Wilfried Tsonga (FRA)	$2,213,694
as of November 30, 2015

== Best matches by ATPWorldTour.com ==
=== Best 5 Grand Slam & Davis Cup matches ===
	Event	Round	Surface	Winner	Opponent	Result
1.	US Open	R3	Hard	(Italy) Fabio Fognini	(Spain) Rafael Nadal	3–6, 4–6, 6–4, 6–3, 6–4
2.	French Open	F	Clay	(Switzerland) Stan Wawrinka	(Serbia) Novak Djokovic	4–6, 6–4, 6–3, 6–4
3.	Wimbledon	SF	Grass	(Switzerland) Roger Federer	(United Kingdom) Andy Murray	7–5, 7–5, 6–4
4.	Davis Cup	R1	Clay	(Argentina) Leonardo Mayer	(Brazil) João Souza	7–6^{(7–4)}, 7–6^{(7–5)}, 5–7, 5–7, 15–13
5.	Wimbledon	QF	Grass	(France) Richard Gasquet	(Switzerland) Stan Wawrinka	6–4, 4–6, 3–6, 6–4, 11–9

=== Best 5 ATP World Tour matches ===
	Event	Round	Surface	Winner	Opponent	Result
1.	Madrid Open	R2	Clay	(Australia) Nick Kyrgios	(Switzerland) Roger Federer	6–7^{(2–7)}, 7–6^{(7–5)}, 7–6^{(14–12)}
2.	Canadian Open	F	Hard	(United Kingdom) Andy Murray	(Serbia) Novak Djokovic	6–4, 4–6, 6–3
3.	Rio Open	QF	Clay	(Italy) Fabio Fognini	(Argentina) Federico Delbonis	6–4, 6–7^{(10–12)}, 7–6^{(9–7)}
4.	Monte-Carlo Masters	R2	Clay	(France) Gaël Monfils	(Ukraine) Alexandr Dolgopolov	7–6^{(7–5)}, 7–6^{(8–6)}
5.	Indian Wells Open	QF	Hard	(Canada) Milos Raonic	(Spain) Rafael Nadal	4–6, 7–6^{(12–10)}, 7–5

== Point distribution ==
Category	W	F	SF	QF	R16	R32	R64	R128	Q	Q3	Q2	Q1
Grand Slam (128S)	2000	1200	720	360	180	90	45	10	25	16	8	0
Grand Slam (64D)	2000	1200	720	360	180	90	0	–	25	–	0	0
ATP World Tour Finals (8S/8D)	1500 (max) 1100 (min)	1000 (max) 600 (min)	600 (max); 200 (min)	200 for each round robin match win, +400 for a semifinal win, +500 for the final win.								
ATP World Tour Masters 1000 (96S)	1000	600	360	180	90	45	25	10	16	–	8	0
ATP World Tour Masters 1000 (56S/48S)	1000	600	360	180	90	45	10	–	25	–	16	0
ATP World Tour Masters 1000 (32D/24D)	1000	600	360	180	90	0	–	–	–	–	–	–
ATP World Tour 500 (48S)	500	300	180	90	45	20	0	–	10	–	4	0
ATP World Tour 500 (32S)	500	300	180	90	45	0	–	–	20	–	10	0
ATP World Tour 500 (16D)	500	300	180	90	0	–	–	–	45	–	0	0
ATP World Tour 250 (48S)	250	150	90	45	20	10	0	–	5	3	0	0
ATP World Tour 250 (32S/28S)	250	150	90	45	20	0	–	–	12	6	0	0
ATP World Tour 250 (16D)	250	150	90	45	0	–	–	–	–	–	–	–

Davis Cup
Rubber category		Match win	Match loss	Team bonus	Performance bonus	Total achievable
Singles	Play-offs	5 / 10^{1}				15
Singles	First round	40	10^{2}			80
Singles	Quarterfinals	65				130
Singles	Semifinals	70				140
Singles	Final	75		75^{3}	125^{4}	150 / 225^{3} / 275^{4}
Singles	Cumulative total	500		500 to 535^{3}	625^{4}	625^{4}
Doubles	Play-offs	10				10
Doubles	First round	50	10^{2}			50
Doubles	Quarterfinals	80				80
Doubles	Semifinals	90				90
Doubles	Final	95		35^{5}		95 / 130^{5}
Doubles	Cumulative total	315		350^{5}		350^{5}

The Davis Cup World Group and World Group Play-Off matches awarded ATP Ranking points from 2009 to 2015.

Glossary

Only live matches earn points; dead rubbers earn no points. If a player does not compete in the singles of one or more rounds he will receive points from the previous round when playing singles at the next tie. This last rule also applies for playing in doubles matches.

^{1} A player who wins a singles rubber in the first day of the tie is awarded 5 points, whereas a singles rubber win in tie's last day grants 10 points for a total of 15 available points.

^{2} For the first round only, any player who competes in a live rubber, without a win, receives 10 ranking points for participation.

^{3} Team bonus awarded to a singles player who wins 7 live matches in a calendar year and his team wins the competition.

^{4} Performance bonus awarded to a singles player who wins 8 live matches in a calendar year. In this case, no Team bonus is awarded.

^{5} Team bonus awarded to an unchanged doubles team who wins 4 matches in a calendar year and his team wins the competition.

== Retirements ==
Following is a list of notable players (winners of a main tour title, and/or part of the ATP rankings top 100 (singles) or top 50 (doubles) for at least one week) who announced their retirement from professional tennis, became inactive (after not playing for more than 52 weeks), or were permanently banned from playing, during the 2015 season:

- Mardy Fish (born 9 December 1981, in Los Angeles, United States) joined the pro tour in 2000, reaching a career high singles ranking of 7 in August 2011, and a career high doubles ranking of 14 in 2009. Fish reached 20 ATP singles finals (including 4 Masters 1000s) and 11 ATP doubles finals, winning 6 singles titles and 8 doubles titles. At the 2004 Olympic Games, he won the silver medal (lost in the final to Nicolás Massú). At Grand Slams, he reached 3 quarterfinals (2007 Australian Open, 2008 US Open, 2011 Wimbledon) in singles and 1 semifinal (2009 Wimbledon) in doubles. He was also an active part of the United States Davis Cup team for 11 ties between 2002 and 2012, reaching the final in 2004. He announced that the US Open would be his last tournament on 22 July 2015.
- Robby Ginepri (born 7 October 1982, in Acworth, Georgia, United States)
- (Czech Republic) Jan Hájek (born 7 August 1983), retired at the beginning of the year.
- Michael Lammer (born 25 March 1982, in Dübendorf, Switzerland) retired in March after Indian Wells.
- Jarkko Nieminen (born 23 July 1981, in Masku, Finland), turned pro in 2000, reaching a career high singles ranking of 13 on 10 July 2006. At Grand Slams, Nieminen reached 3 quarterfinals (2005 US Open, 2006 Wimbledon and 2008 Australian Open) on his career. He retired after the 2015 Stockholm Open.
- (United States) Wayne Odesnik (born 21 November 1985, in Johannesburg, South Africa) retired after being handed a 15-year ban after a second doping violation on 18 March 2015.
- Josselin Ouanna (born 14 April 1986, in Suresnes, France) joined the professional tour in 2004 and reached a career-high ranking of No. 88 in singles in October 2009. He announced his retirement in December 2015.
- Guillaume Rufin (born 26 May 1990, in Viriat, France) joined the professional tour in 2008 and reached a career-high ranking of No. 81 in singles in September 2013.
- Michael Russell (born 1 May 1978, in Detroit, United States), joined the pro tour in 1998, reaching a career high singles ranking of number 60 in 2007, and a career high doubles ranking of number 164 in 2012. Russell reached one doubles finals of the ATP World Tour. In Grand Slams singles, he reached the fourth round the 2001 French Open. He decided to retire at the end of the season at the age of 37.
- Eduardo Schwank (born 23 April 1986, in Rosario, Santa Fe, Argentina)
- Florent Serra (born 28 February 1981, in Bordeaux, France)
- Robin Söderling (born 14 August 1984, in Tibro, Sweden), joined the pro tour in 2001, reaching a career singles ranking of no. 4 on 15 November 2010. Söderling reached in the finals of the 2009 and 2010 French Open. His last professional career was the 2011 Swedish Open and announced his retirement from tennis after four years of illness.
- Potito Starace (born 14 July 1981 in Benevento, Italy)
- (United States) Ryan Sweeting (born 14 July 1987, in Nassau, Bahamas), announced his retirement online in August 2015.
- Danai Udomchoke (born 11 August 1981 in Bangkok, Thailand)

== Comebacks ==
Following are notable players who will come back after retirements during the 2015 ATP Tour season:

- Andy Roddick (born 30 August 1982, in Omaha, United States) joined the pro tour in 2000, and held the no. 1 singles ranking for 13 weeks, including the end of the 2003 season. He won the 2003 US Open, five Masters Series titles, and 32 singles titles overall before his retirement in 2012. He returned for the doubles event at the 2015 BB&T Atlanta Open, partnering Mardy Fish.
- (Australia) Mark Philippoussis

== See also ==
- 2015 WTA Tour
- 2015 ATP Challenger Tour
- Association of Tennis Professionals
- International Tennis Federation
