= 2015 Geneva Open =

- Date: 17–23 May
- Edition: 13th
- Category: ATP World Tour 250
- Draw: 28S / 16D
- Prize money: €439,405
- Surface: Clay
- Location: Geneva, Switzerland
- Venue: Tennis Club de Genève

Champions

Singles
- (Brazil) Thomaz Bellucci

Doubles
- (Colombia) Juan Sebastián Cabal / (Colombia) Robert Farah
- Geneva Open

The 2015 Geneva Open was a men's tennis tournament played on outdoor clay courts. It was the 1st edition of the Geneva Open and part of the ATP World Tour 250 series of the 2015 ATP World Tour. It took place at the Tennis Club de Genève in Geneva, Switzerland, from 17 May through 23 May 2015. Unseeded Thomaz Bellucci wopn the singles title.

== Finals ==
=== Singles ===
- (Brazil) Thomaz Bellucci defeated (Portugal) João Sousa, 7–6^{(7–4)}, 6–4

=== Doubles ===
- (Colombia) Juan Sebastián Cabal / (Colombia) Robert Farah defeated (South Africa) Raven Klaasen / (Chinese Taipei) Lu Yen-hsun, 7–5, 4–6, [10–7]

== Singles main-draw entrants ==
=== Seeds ===
Country	Player	Rank^{1}	Seed
SUI	Stan Wawrinka	4	1
CRO	Marin Čilić	10	2
ESP	Pablo Andújar	43	3
GER	Benjamin Becker	44	4
AUT	Andreas Haider-Maurer	47	5
POR	João Sousa	51	6
CYP	Marcos Baghdatis	60	7
RUS	Mikhail Youzhny	61	8

- Rankings are as of May 11, 2015.

=== Other entrants ===
The following players received wildcards into the singles main draw:

- (Croatia) Marin Čilić
- (Russia) Andrey Rublev
- (Serbia) Janko Tipsarević

The following players received entry from the qualifying draw:

- (Bosnia and Herzegovina) Damir Džumhur
- (Russia) Andrey Kuznetsov
- (France) Adrian Mannarino
- (Czech Republic) Lukáš Rosol

=== Withdrawals ===
Before the tournament

- (Belgium) Steve Darcis →replaced by Jan-Lennard Struff
- (Spain) Marcel Granollers →replaced by Ričardas Berankis
- (Canada) Vasek Pospisil →replaced by Thomaz Bellucci
- (Czech Republic) Radek Štěpánek →replaced by Teymuraz Gabashvili

== Doubles main-draw entrants ==
=== Seeds ===
Country	Player	Country	Player	Rank^{1}	Seed
SWE	Robert Lindstedt	AUT	Jürgen Melzer	65	1
COL	Juan Sebastián Cabal	COL	Robert Farah	73	2
GER	Andre Begemann	AUT	Julian Knowle	78	3
PHI	Treat Huey	USA	Scott Lipsky	83	4

- Rankings are as of May 11, 2015.

=== Other entrants ===
The following pairs received wildcards into the doubles main draw:

- (Switzerland) Henri Laaksonen / (Switzerland) Luca Margaroli
- (Serbia) Janko Tipsarević / (Russia) Mikhail Youzhny

The following pair received entry as alternates:

- (Argentina) Carlos Berlocq / (Brazil) João Souza

=== Withdrawals ===
Before the tournament

- (Serbia) Janko Tipsarević
