= 2015 Rakuten Japan Open Tennis Championships =

- Date: 5–11 October
- Edition: 42nd
- Category: ATP World Tour 500
- Draw: 32S / 16D
- Surface: Hard / outdoor
- Location: Tokyo, Japan

Champions

Singles
- (Switzerland) Stan Wawrinka

Doubles
- (South Africa) Raven Klaasen / (Brazil) Marcelo Melo
| ← 2014 · | Japan Open | · 2016 → |

The 2015 Rakuten Japan Open Tennis Championships was a men's tennis tournament played on outdoor hard courts. It was the 42nd edition of the Japan Open, and part of the 500 Series of the 2015 ATP World Tour. It was held at the Ariake Coliseum in Tokyo, Japan, from October 5–11, 2015.

== Points and prize money ==
=== Point distribution ===
| Event | W | F | SF | QF | Round of 16 | Round of 32 | Q | Q2 | Q1 |
| Singles | 500 | 300 | 180 | 90 | 45 | 0 | 20 | 10 | 0 |
| Doubles | 500 | 300 | 180 | 90 | 0 | — | — | — | — |

=== Prize money ===
| Event | W | F | SF | QF | Round of 16 | Round of 32 | Q2 | Q1 |
| Singles | $306,200 | $138,000 | $65,400 | $31,555 | $16,100 | $8,850 | $1,000 | $550 |
| Doubles | $90,640 | $40,810 | $19,240 | $9,300 | $4,780 | — | — | — |

== Singles main-draw entrants ==
=== Seeds ===
| Country | Player | Rank^{1} | Seed |
|---|---|---|---|
| SUI | Stan Wawrinka | 4 | 1 |
| JPN | Kei Nishikori | 6 | 2 |
| FRA | Gilles Simon | 10 | 3 |
| FRA | Richard Gasquet | 11 | 4 |
| RSA | Kevin Anderson | 12 | 5 |
| CRO | Marin Čilić | 14 | 6 |
| ESP | Feliciano López | 17 | 7 |
| BUL | Grigor Dimitrov | 19 | 8 |

- ^{1} Rankings are as of September 28, 2015.

=== Other entrants ===
The following players received wildcards into the singles main draw:

- (Japan) Tatsuma Ito
- (Japan) Yoshihito Nishioka
- (Japan) Yasutaka Uchiyama

The following players received entry from the qualifying draw:

- (Australia) Matthew Ebden
- (United States) Austin Krajicek
- (United States) Donald Young
- (Russia) Mikhail Youzhny

=== Withdrawals ===
Before the tournament

- (Spain) Pablo Andújar →replaced by Sam Groth
- (Latvia) Ernests Gulbis →replaced by Marcos Baghdatis
- (France) Gaël Monfils →replaced by Albert Ramos Viñolas

=== Retirements ===
- (Australia) Sam Groth (foot injury)
- (Australia) Bernard Tomic (illness)

== Doubles main-draw entrants ==
=== Seeds ===
| Country | Player | Country | Player | Rank^{1} | Seed |
|---|---|---|---|---|---|
| USA | Bob Bryan | USA | Mike Bryan | 2 | 1 |
| FRA | Pierre-Hugues Herbert | FRA | Nicolas Mahut | 18 | 2 |
| RSA | Raven Klaasen | BRA | Marcelo Melo | 30 | 3 |
| AUT | Alexander Peya | BRA | Bruno Soares | 46 | 4 |

- Rankings are as of September 28, 2015

=== Other entrants ===
The following pairs received wildcards into the doubles main draw:

- (United States) Austin Krajicek / (Japan) Yasutaka Uchiyama
- (Japan) Toshihide Matsui / (Finland) Jarkko Nieminen

The following pair received entry from the qualifying draw:

- (United States) Steve Johnson / (United States) Sam Querrey

The following pair received entry as lucky losers:

- (Germany) Andre Begemann / (New Zealand) Artem Sitak

=== Withdrawals ===
Before the tournament

- (South Africa) Kevin Anderson (right knee injury)

== Finals ==
=== Singles ===
- (Switzerland) Stan Wawrinka defeated (France) Benoît Paire, 6–2, 6–4

=== Doubles ===
- (South Africa) Raven Klaasen / (Brazil) Marcelo Melo defeated (Colombia) Juan Sebastián Cabal / (Colombia) Robert Farah, 7–6^{(7–5)}, 3–6, [10–7]
