= 2015 Generali Open Kitzbühel – Doubles =

Doubles
- 2015 Generali Open Kitzbühel

Final
- Champion: (Spain) Nicolás Almagro (Argentina) Carlos Berlocq
- Runner-up: (Netherlands) Robin Haase (Finland) Henri Kontinen
- Score: 5–7, 6–3, [11–9]

Details
- Draw: 16

Events
Singles	Doubles
- Generali Open Kitzbühel

Henri Kontinen and Jarkko Nieminen were the defending champions, but Nieminen chose not to participate this year. Kontinen played alongside Robin Haase but lost in the final to Nicolás Almagro and Carlos Berlocq 5–7, 6–3, [11–9].

== Seeds ==
1. (United Kingdom) Dominic Inglot / (Sweden) Robert Lindstedt (first round)
2. (Germany) Andre Begemann / (Poland) Łukasz Kubot (semifinals)
3. (Poland) Mariusz Fyrstenberg / (Mexico) Santiago González (semifinals)
4. (Austria) Jürgen Melzer / (Germany) Philipp Petzschner (first round)

== Draw ==
Key

- Q = Qualifier
- WC = Wild card
- LL = Lucky loser
- Alt = Alternate
- ITF = ITF entry
- PR = Protected ranking
- SR = Special ranking
- SE = Special exempt
- JE = Junior exempt
- JR = Junior Accelerator Programme entrant
- CO = College Accelerator Programme entrant
- NG = Next Gen Accelerator Program entrant
- w/o = Walkover
- r = Retired
- d = Defaulted

=== Draw ===
First round
1	(United Kingdom) D Inglot (Sweden) R Lindstedt	4	6^{5}
PR	(Spain) N Almagro (Argentina) C Berlocq	6	7^{7}
(Spain) P Carreño Busta (Brazil) A Sá	6^{2}	6	[10]
(Czech Republic) F Čermák (Canada) A Shamasdin	7^{7}	4	[6]
3	(Poland) M Fyrstenberg (Mexico) S González	7	6
WC	(Italy) F Fognini (Italy) A Giraudo	5	3
(Brazil) J Souza (Czech Republic) J Veselý	6	7^{8}
WC	(Austria) A Erler (Germany) P Kohlschreiber	3	6^{6}
(Austria) O Marach (Pakistan) A-u-H Qureshi	4	3
(Netherlands) R Haase (Finland) H Kontinen	6	6
(Austria) J Knowle (Austria) P Oswald	7^{8}	6
4	(Austria) J Melzer (Germany) P Petzschner	6^{6}	2
(New Zealand) M Daniell (Brazil) M Demoliner	4	6	[3]
(Spain) D Gimeno-Traver (Argentina) D Schwartzman	6	3	[10]
(Austria) A Haider-Maurer (Australia) R Junaid	5	7	[4]
2	(Germany) A Begemann (Poland) Ł Kubot	7	5	[10]

Quarterfinals
PR	(Spain) N Almagro (Argentina) C Berlocq	6	6
(Spain) P Carreño Busta (Brazil) A Sá	1	1
3	(Poland) M Fyrstenberg (Mexico) S González	5	6	[10]
(Brazil) J Souza (Czech Republic) J Veselý	7	4	[5]
(Netherlands) R Haase (Finland) H Kontinen	6	7
(Austria) J Knowle (Austria) P Oswald	3	5
(Spain) D Gimeno-Traver (Argentina) D Schwartzman	6^{5}	1
2	(Germany) A Begemann (Poland) Ł Kubot	7^{7}	6

Semifinals
PR	(Spain) N Almagro (Argentina) C Berlocq	7^{7}	6^{6}	[10]
3	(Poland) M Fyrstenberg (Mexico) S González	6^{4}	7^{8}	[4]
(Netherlands) R Haase (Finland) H Kontinen	6	7^{8}
2	(Germany) A Begemann (Poland) Ł Kubot	3	6^{6}

Final
PR	(Spain) N Almagro (Argentina) C Berlocq	5	6	[11]
(Netherlands) R Haase (Finland) H Kontinen	7	3	[9]
