= 2015 Generali Open Kitzbühel =

- Date: 3–8 August
- Edition: 71st
- Category: World Tour 250 series
- Surface: Clay / outdoor
- Location: Kitzbühel, Austria
- Venue: Tennis stadium Kitzbühel

Champions

Singles
- (Germany) Philipp Kohlschreiber

Doubles
- (Spain) Nicolás Almagro / (Argentina) Carlos Berlocq
| ← 2014 · | Generali Open Kitzbühel | · 2016 → |

The 2015 Generali Open Kitzbühel was a men's tennis tournament played on outdoor clay courts. It was the 71st edition of the Austrian Open Kitzbühel, and part of the World Tour 250 series of the 2015 ATP World Tour. It took place at the Tennis stadium Kitzbühel in Kitzbühel, Austria, from August 3 through August 8.

== Singles main draw entrants ==
=== Seeds ===
| Country | Player | Rank^{1} | Seed |
|---|---|---|---|
| AUT | Dominic Thiem | 24 | 1 |
| ITA | Andreas Seppi | 26 | 2 |
| ITA | Fabio Fognini | 32 | 3 |
| SVK | Martin Kližan | 34 | 4 |
| ARG | Juan Mónaco | 38 | 5 |
| GER | Philipp Kohlschreiber | 40 | 6 |
| CZE | Jiří Veselý | 45 | 7 |
| ESP | Albert Ramos-Viñolas | 55 | 8 |

- ^{1} Rankings are as of July 27, 2015

=== Other entrants ===
The following players received wildcards into the singles main draw:

- (Austria) Gerald Melzer
- (Austria) Jürgen Melzer
- (Austria) Dennis Novak

The following player received entry as a lucky loser:

- (Spain) Albert Montañés

The following players received entry from the qualifying draw:

- (France) Kenny de Schepper
- (Brazil) Rogério Dutra Silva
- (France) Paul-Henri Mathieu
- (Germany) Jan-Lennard Struff

=== Withdrawals ===
Before the tournament

- (Spain) Pablo Andújar →replaced by Dušan Lajović
- (Italy) Simone Bolelli →replaced by Albert Montañés
- (Spain) Guillermo García-López →replaced by Mikhail Youzhny
- (Belgium) David Goffin →replaced by Aljaž Bedene
- (France) Gilles Simon →replaced by Pablo Carreño Busta
- (Portugal) João Sousa →replaced by João Souza

=== Retirements ===
- (Argentina) Juan Mónaco

== Doubles main draw entrants ==
=== Seeds ===
| Country | Player | Country | Player | Rank^{1} | Seed |
|---|---|---|---|---|---|
| GBR | Dominic Inglot | SWE | Robert Lindstedt | 78 | 1 |
| GER | Andre Begemann | POL | Łukasz Kubot | 91 | 2 |
| POL | Mariusz Fyrstenberg | MEX | Santiago González | 91 | 3 |
| AUT | Jürgen Melzer | GER | Philipp Petzschner | 93 | 4 |

- Rankings are as of July 27, 2015

=== Other entrants ===
The following pairs received wildcards into the doubles main draw:

- (Austria) Alexander Erler / (Germany) Philipp Kohlschreiber
- (Italy) Fabio Fognini / (Italy) Alberto Giraudo

== Finals ==
=== Singles ===
- (Germany) Philipp Kohlschreiber defeated (France) Paul-Henri Mathieu, 2–6, 6–2, 6–2

=== Doubles ===
- (Spain) Nicolás Almagro / (Argentina) Carlos Berlocq defeated (Netherlands) Robin Haase / (Finland) Henri Kontinen, 5–7, 6–3, [11–9]
