= 2015 Geneva Open – Doubles =

Doubles
- 2015 Geneva Open

Final
- Champions: (Colombia) Juan Sebastián Cabal (Colombia) Robert Farah
- Runners-up: (South Africa) Raven Klaasen (Chinese Taipei) Lu Yen-hsun
- Score: 7–5, 4–6, [10–7]

Events
Singles	Doubles
← 1991 ·	Geneva Open	· 2016 →

This was the first edition of the tournament since 1991.

Juan Sebastián Cabal and Robert Farah won the title, defeating Raven Klaasen and Lu Yen-hsun in the final, 7–5, 4–6, [10–7].

== Seeds ==
1. (Sweden) Robert Lindstedt / (Austria) Jürgen Melzer (first round)
2. (Colombia) Juan Sebastián Cabal / (Colombia) Robert Farah (champions)
3. (Germany) Andre Begemann / (Austria) Julian Knowle (first round)
4. (Philippines) Treat Huey / (United States) Scott Lipsky (semifinals)

== Draw ==
=== Key ===
- Q = Qualifier
- WC = Wild card
- LL = Lucky loser
- Alt = Alternate
- SE = Special exempt
- PR = Protected ranking
- ITF = ITF entry
- JE = Junior exempt
- w/o = Walkover
- r = Retired
- d = Defaulted
- SR = Special ranking

=== Draw ===
First round
1	(Sweden) R Lindstedt (Austria) J Melzer	6^{2}	7^{7}	[6]
(Czech Republic) F Čermák (Israel) J Erlich	7^{7}	6^{4}	[10]
(South Africa) R Klaasen (Chinese Taipei) Y-h Lu	6	6
WC	(Switzerland) H Laaksonen (Switzerland) L Margaroli	0	2
4	(Philippines) T Huey (United States) S Lipsky	6	6
(Austria) O Marach (Austria) P Oswald	2	3
(United States) N Monroe (New Zealand) A Sitak	6	5	[6]
(Australia) R Junaid (Canada) A Shamasdin	4	7	[10]
(Bosnia and Herzegovina) D Džumhur (Austria) A Haider-Maurer	4	6	[8]
(Argentina) F Delbonis (Portugal) J Sousa	6	3	[10]
(Belarus) A Bury (Uzbekistan) D Istomin	6	6
3	(Germany) A Begemann (Austria) J Knowle	2	4
(Germany) B Becker (Lithuania) R Berankis	2^{r}
(United States) R Ram (United States) D Young	5
Alt	(Argentina) C Berlocq (Brazil) J Souza	6	6^{1}	[8]
2	(Colombia) JS Cabal (Colombia) R Farah	3	7^{7}	[10]

Quarterfinals
(Czech Republic) F Čermák (Israel) J Erlich	2	1
(South Africa) R Klaasen (Chinese Taipei) Y-h Lu	6	6
4	(Philippines) T Huey (United States) S Lipsky	6	6
(Australia) R Junaid (Canada) A Shamasdin	2	1
(Argentina) F Delbonis (Portugal) J Sousa	6	6^{4}	[9]
(Belarus) A Bury (Uzbekistan) D Istomin	3	7^{7}	[11]
(United States) R Ram (United States) D Young	4	7^{7}	[11]
2	(Colombia) JS Cabal (Colombia) R Farah	6	6^{3}	[13]

Semifinals
(South Africa) R Klaasen (Chinese Taipei) Y-h Lu	7^{7}	6
4	(Philippines) T Huey (United States) S Lipsky	6^{3}	3
(Belarus) A Bury (Uzbekistan) D Istomin	6	2	[8]
2	(Colombia) JS Cabal (Colombia) R Farah	4	6	[10]

Final
(South Africa) R Klaasen (Chinese Taipei) Y-h Lu	5	6	[7]
2	(Colombia) JS Cabal (Colombia) R Farah	7	4	[10]
