= 2015 Geneva Open – Singles =

Singles
- 2015 Geneva Open

Final
- Champion: (Brazil) Thomaz Bellucci
- Runner-up: (Portugal) João Sousa
- Score: 7–6^{(7–4)}, 6–4

Details
- Draw: 28
- Seeds: 8

Events
Singles	Doubles
- Geneva Open

This was the first edition of the tournament since 1991.
Thomaz Bellucci won the title, defeating João Sousa in the final, 7–6^{(7–4)}, 6–4.

== Seeds ==
The top four seeds receive a bye into the second round.

1. (Switzerland) Stan Wawrinka (quarterfinals)
2. (Croatia) Marin Čilić (quarterfinals)
3. (Spain) Pablo Andújar (quarterfinals)
4. (Germany) Benjamin Becker (second round)
5. (Austria) Andreas Haider-Maurer (first round)
6. (Portugal) João Sousa (final)
7. (Cyprus) Marcos Baghdatis (first round)
8. (Russia) Mikhail Youzhny (second round)

== Draw ==
Key

- Q = Qualifier
- WC = Wild card
- LL = Lucky loser
- Alt = Alternate
- ITF = ITF entry
- PR = Protected ranking
- SR = Special ranking
- SE = Special exempt
- JE = Junior exempt
- JR = Junior Accelerator Programme entrant
- CO = College Accelerator Programme entrant
- NG = Next Gen Accelerator Program entrant
- w/o = Walkover
- r = Retired
- d = Defaulted

=== Finals ===
Semifinals
(Argentina) Federico Delbonis	3	6	4
6	(Portugal) João Sousa	6	2	6
(Brazil) Thomaz Bellucci	6	6
(Colombia) Santiago Giraldo	3	4

Final
6	(Portugal) João Sousa	6^{4}	4
(Brazil) Thomaz Bellucci	7^{7}	6

=== Top half ===
First round
(Chinese Taipei) Y-h Lu	6	6^{1}	5
Q	(Czech Republic) L Rosol	1	7^{7}	7
(Argentina) F Delbonis	6	6
(Russia) T Gabashvili	3	4
Q	(Russia) A Kuznetsov	6	6
5	(Austria) A Haider-Maurer	2	4
Q	(France) A Mannarino	4	6	6
(Argentina) C Berlocq	6	1	4
Q	(Bosnia and Herzegovina) D Džumhur	2	3
(Austria) J Melzer	6	6
(Brazil) J Souza	5	3
6	(Portugal) J Sousa	7	6

Second round
1	(Switzerland) S Wawrinka	6	3	6
Q	(Czech Republic) L Rosol	4	6	3
(Argentina) F Delbonis	6	6
Q	(Russia) A Kuznetsov	3	4
3	(Spain) P Andújar	3	7^{7}	6
Q	(France) A Mannarino	6	6^{2}	2
(Austria) J Melzer	4	4
6	(Portugal) J Sousa	6	6

Quarterfinals
1	(Switzerland) S Wawrinka	7^{7}	4	4
(Argentina) F Delbonis	6^{5}	6	6
3	(Spain) P Andújar	4	6	6^{6}
6	(Portugal) J Sousa	6	2	7^{8}

Semifinals
(Argentina) F Delbonis	3	6	4
6	(Portugal) J Sousa	6	2	6

=== Bottom half ===
First round
7	(Cyprus) M Baghdatis	7^{7}	3	3
(Brazil) T Bellucci	6^{5}	6	6
WC	(Serbia) J Tipsarević	0	2
(Uzbekistan) D Istomin	6	6
(Spain) A Ramos Viñolas	7^{7}	6
(Australia) M Matosevic	6^{2}	2
8	(Russia) M Youzhny	7^{7}	7^{7}
(Germany) J-L Struff	6^{2}	6^{5}
(Lithuania) R Berankis	3	7^{7}	3
(Colombia) S Giraldo	6	6^{5}	6
(Finland) J Nieminen	3	7^{7}	6^{4}
WC	(Russia) A Rublev	6	6^{4}	7^{7}

Second round
(Brazil) T Bellucci	6	6
(Uzbekistan) D Istomin	4	4
(Spain) A Ramos Viñolas	7^{7}	6
4	(Germany) B Becker	6^{2}	2
8	(Russia) M Youzhny	4	4
(Colombia) S Giraldo	6	6
WC	(Russia) A Rublev	6	6^{7}	1
2/WC	(Croatia) M Čilić	4	7^{9}	6

Quarterfinals
(Brazil) T Bellucci	6	1	6
(Spain) A Ramos Viñolas	0	6	3
(Colombia) S Giraldo	7	6
2/WC	(Croatia) M Čilić	5	3

Semifinals
(Brazil) T Bellucci	6	6
(Colombia) S Giraldo	3	4

== Qualifying ==
=== Seeds ===
1. (France) Adrian Mannarino (qualified)
2. (Czech Republic) Lukáš Rosol (qualified)
3. (United States) Donald Young (qualifying competition)
4. (Bosnia and Herzegovina) Damir Džumhur (qualified)
5. (Russia) Andrey Kuznetsov (qualified)
6. (India) Somdev Devvarman (qualifying competition)
7. (Argentina) Pedro Cachin (second round)
8. (Italy) Matteo Donati (qualifying competition)

=== Qualifiers ===
1. (France) Adrian Mannarino
2. (Czech Republic) Lukáš Rosol
3. (Russia) Andrey Kuznetsov
4. (Bosnia and Herzegovina) Damir Džumhur

=== Qualifying draw ===
==== First qualifier ====
First round
(Switzerland) Luca Margaroli	6^{5}	1
(Serbia) Miki Janković	7^{7}	6
(France) Hugo Nys	3	5
(Italy) Lorenzo Giustino	6	7
(Austria) Oliver Marach	5	6^{5}
6	(India) Somdev Devvarman	7	7^{7}

Second round
1	(France) Adrian Mannarino	6	6
(Serbia) Miki Janković	3	4
(Italy) Lorenzo Giustino	1	4
6	(India) Somdev Devvarman	6	6

Qualifying competition
1	(France) Adrian Mannarino	7	6
6	(India) Somdev Devvarman	5	1

==== Second qualifier ====
First round
2	(Czech Republic) Lukáš Rosol	4	7^{7}	6
(France) Laurent Rochette	6	6^{4}	1
(Ukraine) Gleb Alekseenko	6	3	6
(India) Vijay Sundar Prashanth	3	6	2
(Switzerland) Yann Marti	7^{7}	6
WC	(Germany) Andre Begemann	6^{2}	4
(United States) Nicholas Monroe	2	4
7	(Argentina) Pedro Cachin	6	6

Second round
2	(Czech Republic) Lukáš Rosol	6	6
(Ukraine) Gleb Alekseenko	4	0
(Switzerland) Yann Marti	6	6
7	(Argentina) Pedro Cachin	4	1

Qualifying competition
2	(Czech Republic) Lukáš Rosol	6	6
(Switzerland) Yann Marti	3	2

==== Third qualifier ====
First round
3	(United States) Donald Young	6	6
WC	(Switzerland) Sevan Kelpetindjian	0	0
(Australia) Rameez Junaid	6	3	3
(Switzerland) Henri Laaksonen	3	6	6
WC	(Germany) Nicolas Daniel Olguin	0	1
(Austria) Philipp Oswald	6	6
(Germany) Tobias Simon	4	2
5	(Russia) Andrey Kuznetsov	6	6

Second round
3	(United States) Donald Young	6	6
(Switzerland) Henri Laaksonen	1	4
(Austria) Philipp Oswald	4	2
5	(Russia) Andrey Kuznetsov	6	6

Qualifying competition
3	(United States) Donald Young	2	0
5	(Russia) Andrey Kuznetsov	6	6

==== Fourth qualifier ====
First round
4	(Bosnia and Herzegovina) Damir Džumhur	6	6
(Switzerland) Stefan Fiacan	3	1
(Portugal) Gonçalo Oliveira	6^{7}	3
(Germany) Daniel Brands	7^{9}	6
(Russia) Mikhail Ledovskikh	6	6
WC	(Switzerland) Loïc Perret	3	2
(Ukraine) Alexandr Kushakov	2	0^{r}
8	(Italy) Matteo Donati	6	3

Second round
4	(Bosnia and Herzegovina) Damir Džumhur	3	6	6
(Germany) Daniel Brands	6	3	3
(Russia) Mikhail Ledovskikh	6^{4}	2^{r}
8	(Italy) Matteo Donati	7^{7}	4

Qualifying competition
4	(Bosnia and Herzegovina) Damir Džumhur	7^{8}	6
8	(Italy) Matteo Donati	6^{6}	3
