= 2015 Generali Open Kitzbühel – Singles =

Singles
- 2015 Generali Open Kitzbühel

Final
- Champion: (Germany) Philipp Kohlschreiber
- Runner-up: (France) Paul-Henri Mathieu
- Score: 2–6, 6–2, 6–2

Events
Singles	Doubles
- Generali Open Kitzbühel

David Goffin was the defending champion, but withdrew before the tournament began.

Philipp Kohlschreiber won the title, defeating Paul-Henri Mathieu in the final, 2–6, 6–2, 6–2.

== Seeds ==
The top four seeds receive a bye into the second round.

1. (Austria) Dominic Thiem (semifinals)
2. (Italy) Andreas Seppi (second round, retired)
3. (Italy) Fabio Fognini (quarterfinals)
4. (Slovakia) Martin Kližan (second round)
5. (Argentina) Juan Mónaco (first round, retired)
6. (Germany) Philipp Kohlschreiber (champion)
7. (Czech Republic) Jiří Veselý (first round)
8. (Spain) Albert Ramos Viñolas (first round)

== Draw ==
Key

- Q = Qualifier
- WC = Wild card
- LL = Lucky loser
- Alt = Alternate
- ITF = ITF entry
- PR = Protected ranking
- SR = Special ranking
- SE = Special exempt
- JE = Junior exempt
- JR = Junior Accelerator Programme entrant
- CO = College Accelerator Programme entrant
- NG = Next Gen Accelerator Program entrant
- w/o = Walkover
- r = Retired
- d = Defaulted

=== Finals ===
Semifinals
1	(Austria) Dominic Thiem	0	6^{6}
6	(Germany) Philipp Kohlschreiber	6	7^{8}
Q	(France) Paul-Henri Mathieu	6	6
PR	(Spain) Nicolás Almagro	4	3

Final
6	(Germany) Philipp Kohlschreiber	2	6	6
Q	(France) Paul-Henri Mathieu	6	2	2

=== Top half ===
First round
(Austria) A Haider-Maurer	7^{7}	6
(Brazil) J Souza	6^{2}	4
WC	(Austria) G Melzer	4	6^{5}
LL	(Spain) A Montañés	6	7^{7}
(Argentina) D Schwartzman	6	6
8	(Spain) A Ramos	3	4
WC	(Austria) D Novak	6^{2}	6	6
(United Kingdom) A Bedene	7^{7}	4	1
(Colombia) S Giraldo	7	6
Q	(Brazil) R Dutra Silva	5	2
Q	(Germany) J-L Struff	3	7^{7}	3
6	(Germany) P Kohlschreiber	6	6^{5}	6

Second round
1	(Austria) D Thiem	1	7^{8}	6
(Austria) A Haider-Maurer	6	6^{6}	4
LL	(Spain) A Montañés	6	6
(Argentina) D Schwartzman	1	3
3	(Italy) F Fognini	6	6
WC	(Austria) D Novak	1	2
(Colombia) S Giraldo	0	2
6	(Germany) P Kohlschreiber	6	6

Quarterfinals
1	(Austria) D Thiem	7^{7}	3
LL	(Spain) A Montañés	6^{3}	2^{r}
3	(Italy) F Fognini	6^{0}	4
6	(Germany) P Kohlschreiber	7^{7}	6

Semifinals
1	(Austria) D Thiem	0	6^{6}
6	(Germany) P Kohlschreiber	6	7^{8}

=== Bottom half ===
First round
5	(Argentina) J Mónaco	6	1^{r}
(Netherlands) R Haase	2	1
(Spain) P Carreño Busta	5	4
(Argentina) F Delbonis	7	6
Q	(France) K de Schepper	2	2
Q	(France) P-H Mathieu	6	6
7	(Czech Republic) J Veselý	7^{7}	5	4
PR	(Spain) N Almagro	6^{2}	7	6
WC	(Austria) J Melzer	7^{7}	6
(Spain) D Gimeno Traver	6^{3}	3
(Russia) M Youzhny	3	4
(Serbia) D Lajović	6	6

Second round
(Netherlands) R Haase	6	2	2
(Argentina) F Delbonis	4	6	6
Q	(France) P-H Mathieu	6	7
4	(Slovakia) M Kližan	3	5
PR	(Spain) N Almagro	7^{7}	7
WC	(Austria) J Melzer	6^{4}	5
(Serbia) D Lajović	7	3
2	(Italy) A Seppi	5	0^{r}

Quarterfinals
(Argentina) F Delbonis	3	6	3
Q	(France) P-H Mathieu	6	0	6
PR	(Spain) N Almagro	6	6
(Serbia) D Lajović	3	4

Semifinals
Q	(France) P-H Mathieu	6	6
PR	(Spain) N Almagro	4	3

== Qualifying ==
=== Seeds ===
1. (France) Paul-Henri Mathieu (qualified)
2. (Spain) Albert Montañés (qualifying competition, lucky loser)
3. (Germany) Jan-Lennard Struff (qualified)
4. (Slovakia) Norbert Gombos (first round)
5. (France) Kenny de Schepper (qualified)
6. (Argentina) Carlos Berlocq (qualifying competition)
7. (Slovakia) Jozef Kovalík (qualifying competition)
8. (Romania) Marius Copil (second round)

=== Qualifiers ===
1. (France) Paul-Henri Mathieu
2. (France) Kenny de Schepper
3. (Germany) Jan-Lennard Struff
4. (Brazil) Rogério Dutra Silva

=== Lucky loser ===
1. (Spain) Albert Montañés

=== Qualifying draw ===
==== First qualifier ====
First round
(Austria) Lukas Jastraunig	6	2	6^{5}
(Czech Republic) Marek Michalička	4	6	7^{7}
(Spain) Jaume Munar	6	6
(Croatia) Stefan Merunka	2	0
(Russia) Mikhail Ledovskikh	4	4
8	(Romania) Marius Copil	6	6

Second round
1	(France) Paul-Henri Mathieu	6	6
(Czech Republic) Marek Michalička	2	4
(Spain) Jaume Munar	3	7^{8}	6
8	(Romania) Marius Copil	6	6^{6}	2

Qualifying competition
1	(France) Paul-Henri Mathieu	6	6
(Spain) Jaume Munar	4	3

==== Second qualifier ====
First round
2	(Spain) Albert Montañés	6	6
(Switzerland) Jannis Liniger	0	0
(Romania) Victor Hănescu	6	3	7
(Austria) Michael Linzer	2	6	5
(Czech Republic) František Čermák	1	2
(Russia) Anton Zaitcev	6	6
(Austria) Gibril Diarra	3	2
5	(France) Kenny de Schepper	6	6

Second round
2	(Spain) Albert Montañés	6	6
(Romania) Victor Hănescu	2	3
(Russia) Anton Zaitcev	3	4
5	(France) Kenny de Schepper	6	6

Qualifying competition
2	(Spain) Albert Montañés	6	6^{4}	5
5	(France) Kenny de Schepper	3	7^{7}	7

==== Third qualifier ====
First round
3	(Germany) Jan-Lennard Struff	6	6
(Spain) Jordi Samper Montaña	4	1
(Argentina) Pedro Cachin	2	2
WC	(Austria) Lenny Hampel	6	6
WC	(Austria) Alexander Erler	1	6^{1}
WC	(Austria) Lucas Miedler	6	7^{7}
(Austria) Bastian Trinker	5	2
7	(Slovakia) Jozef Kovalík	7	6

Second round
3	(Germany) Jan-Lennard Struff	6	6
WC	(Austria) Lenny Hampel	4	3
WC	(Austria) Lucas Miedler	6^{6}	4
7	(Slovakia) Jozef Kovalík	7^{8}	6

Qualifying competition
3	(Germany) Jan-Lennard Struff	6	7
7	(Slovakia) Jozef Kovalík	2	5

==== Fourth qualifier ====
First round
4	(Slovakia) Norbert Gombos	7^{7}	4	1
(Brazil) Rogério Dutra Silva	6^{1}	6	6
(France) François-Arthur Vibert	0	1
(Austria) Pascal Brunner	6	6
(Austria) Maximilian Neuchrist	4	6	3
(Brazil) André Sá	6	3	6
(Croatia) Viktor Galović	2	4
6	(Argentina) Carlos Berlocq	6	6

Second round
(Brazil) Rogério Dutra Silva	6	6
(Austria) Pascal Brunner	4	4
(Brazil) André Sá	4	0
6	(Argentina) Carlos Berlocq	6	6

Qualifying competition
(Brazil) Rogério Dutra Silva	6	4	7^{7}
6	(Argentina) Carlos Berlocq	4	6	6^{3}
