= 2015 Rakuten Japan Open Tennis Championships – Singles =

Singles
- 2015 Rakuten Japan Open Tennis Championships

Final
- Champion: (Switzerland) Stan Wawrinka
- Runner-up: (France) Benoît Paire
- Score: 6–2, 6–4

Details
- Draw: 32 (4Q / 3WC)
- Seeds: 8

Events
Singles	Doubles
← 2014 ·	Japan Open	· 2016 →

Kei Nishikori was the defending champion, but lost to Benoît Paire in the semifinals.

Stan Wawrinka won the title, defeating Paire in the final, 6–2, 6–4.

== Seeds ==
1. (Switzerland) Stan Wawrinka (champion)
2. (Japan) Kei Nishikori (semifinals)
3. (France) Gilles Simon (quarterfinals)
4. (France) Richard Gasquet (first round)
5. (South Africa) Kevin Anderson (first round)
6. (Croatia) Marin Čilić (quarterfinals)
7. (Spain) Feliciano López (first round)
8. (Bulgaria) Grigor Dimitrov (first round)

== Draw ==
=== Key ===
- Q = Qualifier
- WC = Wild card
- LL = Lucky loser
- Alt = Alternate
- SE = Special exempt
- PR = Protected ranking
- ITF = ITF entry
- JE = Junior exempt
- w/o = Walkover
- r = Retired
- d = Defaulted
- SR = Special ranking

=== Finals ===
Semifinals
1	(Switzerland) Stan Wawrinka	6	7^{7}
(Luxembourg) Gilles Müller	4	6^{5}
(France) Benoît Paire	1	6	6
2	(Japan) Kei Nishikori	6	4	2

Final
1	(Switzerland) Stan Wawrinka	6	6
(France) Benoît Paire	2	4

=== Top half ===
First round
1	(Switzerland) S Wawrinka	7	6
PR	(Czech Republic) R Štěpánek	5	3
WC	(Japan) Y Nishioka	6	0	5
WC	(Japan) T Ito	3	6	7
Q	(Australia) M Ebden	7	6^{4}	6^{5}
Q	(United States) A Krajicek	5	7^{7}	7^{7}
(Portugal) J Sousa	6	4	6
7	(Spain) F López	4	6	1
3	(France) G Simon	6	6
Q	(Russia) M Youzhny	4	4
(Czech Republic) J Veselý	6	6
WC	(Japan) Y Uchiyama	4	4
(France) J Chardy	6	2
(Australia) S Groth	3	0^{r}
(Luxembourg) G Müller	6	6
5	(South Africa) K Anderson	2	3

Second round
1	(Switzerland) S Wawrinka	6	2	6
WC	(Japan) T Ito	3	6	4
Q	(United States) A Krajicek	2	6	6
(Portugal) J Sousa	6	4	3
3	(France) G Simon	6	6
(Czech Republic) J Veselý	4	2
(France) J Chardy	6^{3}	6^{5}
(Luxembourg) G Müller	7^{7}	7^{7}

Quarterfinals
1	(Switzerland) S Wawrinka	6	6
Q	(United States) A Krajicek	3	4
3	(France) G Simon	3	4
(Luxembourg) G Müller	6	6

Semifinals
1	(Switzerland) S Wawrinka	6	7^{7}
(Luxembourg) G Müller	4	6^{5}

=== Bottom half ===
First round
8	(Bulgaria) G Dimitrov	4	6	1
(France) B Paire	6	3	6
(Cyprus) M Baghdatis	7	6
(Spain) F Verdasco	5	1
(Spain) A Ramos-Viñolas	7^{7}	3	3
(Australia) N Kyrgios	6^{3}	6	6
(Spain) R Bautista Agut	6	6
4	(France) R Gasquet	4	1
6	(Croatia) M Čilić	7	5	6
Q	(United States) D Young	5	7	4
(Australia) B Tomic	3	1^{r}
(United States) S Johnson	6	2
(Ukraine) A Dolgopolov	6^{5}	4
(United States) S Querrey	7^{7}	6
(Croatia) B Ćorić	6	1	2
2	(Japan) K Nishikori	2	6	6

Second round
(France) B Paire	6	2	7
(Cyprus) M Baghdatis	3	6	5
(Australia) N Kyrgios	6	6
(Spain) R Bautista Agut	4	2
6	(Croatia) M Čilić	6	6
(United States) S Johnson	3	3
(United States) S Querrey	6^{3}	3
2	(Japan) K Nishikori	7^{7}	6

Quarterfinals
(France) B Paire	3	6	6
(Australia) N Kyrgios	6	4	1
6	(Croatia) M Čilić	6	5	3
2	(Japan) K Nishikori	3	7	6

Semifinals
(France) B Paire	1	6	6
2	(Japan) K Nishikori	6	4	2

== Qualifying ==
=== Seeds ===
1. (United States) Donald Young (qualified)
2. (France) Nicolas Mahut (qualifying competition)
3. (Russia) Mikhail Youzhny (qualified)
4. (Georgia (country)) Nikoloz Basilashvili (first round)
5. (France) Pierre-Hugues Herbert (qualifying competition)
6. (Japan) Go Soeda (qualifying competition)
7. (United States) Austin Krajicek (qualified)
8. (Japan) Yūichi Sugita (first round)

=== Qualifiers ===
1. (United States) Donald Young
2. (United States) Austin Krajicek
3. (Russia) Mikhail Youzhny
4. (Australia) Matthew Ebden

=== Qualifying draw ===
==== First qualifier ====
First round
1	(United States) Donald Young	6	7^{7}
(Poland) Michał Przysiężny	1	6^{1}
(Japan) Hiroki Moriya	6	2	7^{7}
8	(Japan) Yūichi Sugita	2	6	6^{1}

Qualifying competition
1	(United States) Donald Young	6	6
(Japan) Hiroki Moriya	1	4

==== Second qualifier ====
First round
2	(France) Nicolas Mahut	6	4	6
(Chinese Taipei) Chen Ti	3	6	0
WC	(Japan) Shuichi Sekiguchi	2	4
7	(United States) Austin Krajicek	6	6

Qualifying competition
2	(France) Nicolas Mahut	4	4
7	(United States) Austin Krajicek	6	6

==== Third qualifier ====
First round
3	(Russia) Mikhail Youzhny	7^{7}	6
(Finland) Jarkko Nieminen	6^{3}	3
WC	(Japan) Hiroyasu Ehara	1	6	5
5	(France) Pierre-Hugues Herbert	6	1	7

Qualifying competition
3	(Russia) Mikhail Youzhny	7^{9}	6
5	(France) Pierre-Hugues Herbert	6^{7}	4

==== Fourth qualifier ====
First round
4	(Georgia (country)) Nikoloz Basilashvili	6^{5}	0
(Australia) Matthew Ebden	7^{7}	6
WC	(Japan) Takuto Niki	3	6^{3}
6	(Japan) Go Soeda	6	7^{7}

Qualifying competition
(Australia) Matthew Ebden	6	4	6
6	(Japan) Go Soeda	3	6	3
