= 2015 Rakuten Japan Open Tennis Championships – Doubles =

Doubles
- 2015 Rakuten Japan Open Tennis Championships

Final
- Champions: (South Africa) Raven Klaasen (Brazil) Marcelo Melo
- Runners-up: (Colombia) Juan Sebastián Cabal (Colombia) Robert Farah
- Score: 7–6^{(7–5)}, 3–6, [10–7]

Details
- Draw: 16 (1Q / 2WC)
- Seeds: 4

Events
Singles	Doubles
- Japan Open

Pierre-Hugues Herbert and Michał Przysiężny were the defending champions, but Prysiężny chose not to participate. Herbert played alongside Nicolas Mahut, but lost in the quarterfinals to Aisam-ul-Haq Qureshi and Gilles Simon.

Raven Klaasen and Marcelo Melo won the title, defeating Juan Sebastián Cabal and Robert Farah in the final, 7–6^{(7–5)}, 3–6, [10–7].

== Seeds ==
1. (United States) Bob Bryan / (United States) Mike Bryan (first round)
2. (France) Pierre-Hugues Herbert / (France) Nicolas Mahut (quarterfinals)
3. (South Africa) Raven Klaasen / (Brazil) Marcelo Melo (champions)
4. (Austria) Alexander Peya / (Brazil) Bruno Soares (quarterfinals)

== Draw ==
Key

- Q = Qualifier
- WC = Wild card
- LL = Lucky loser
- Alt = Alternate
- ITF = ITF entry
- PR = Protected ranking
- SR = Special ranking
- SE = Special exempt
- JE = Junior exempt
- JR = Junior Accelerator Programme entrant
- CO = College Accelerator Programme entrant
- NG = Next Gen Accelerator Program entrant
- w/o = Walkover
- r = Retired
- d = Defaulted

=== Draw ===
First round
1	(United States) B Bryan (United States) M Bryan	6^{8}	7	[6]
(Colombia) JS Cabal (Colombia) R Farah	7^{10}	5	[10]
(Mexico) S González (France) B Paire	6^{7}	0
(France) R Gasquet (Spain) F Verdasco	7^{9}	6
4	(Austria) A Peya (Brazil) B Soares	6^{2}	6	[10]
PR	(United States) R Ram (Czech Republic) R Štěpánek	7^{7}	4	[4]
(Spain) F López (Belarus) M Mirnyi	4	6^{3}
Q	(United States) S Johnson (United States) S Querrey	6	7^{7}
(Philippines) T Huey (Finland) H Kontinen	5	6	[10]
LL	(Germany) A Begemann (Australia) A Sitak	7	0	[8]
(Ukraine) A Dolgopolov (Australia) B Tomic	6^{3}	6^{6}
3	(South Africa) R Klaasen (Brazil) M Melo	7^{7}	7^{8}
WC	(Japan) T Matsui (Finland) J Nieminen	7^{7}	3	[6]
(Pakistan) A-u-H Qureshi (France) G Simon	6^{2}	6	[10]
WC	(United States) A Krajicek (Japan) Y Uchiyama	4	6^{4}
2	(France) P-H Herbert (France) N Mahut	6	7^{7}

Quarterfinals
(Colombia) JS Cabal (Colombia) R Farah	6	6^{5}	[10]
(France) R Gasquet (Spain) F Verdasco	4	7^{7}	[5]
4	(Austria) A Peya (Brazil) B Soares	6^{3}	4
Q	(United States) S Johnson (United States) S Querrey	7^{7}	6
(Philippines) T Huey (Finland) H Kontinen	6	6^{3}	[7]
3	(South Africa) R Klaasen (Brazil) M Melo	2	7^{7}	[10]
(Pakistan) A-u-H Qureshi (France) G Simon	4	6	[10]
2	(France) P-H Herbert (France) N Mahut	6	3	[8]

Semifinals
(Colombia) JS Cabal (Colombia) R Farah	7	4	[10]
Q	(United States) S Johnson (United States) S Querrey	5	6	[8]
3	(South Africa) R Klaasen (Brazil) M Melo	6	6
(Pakistan) A-u-H Qureshi (France) G Simon	4	3

Final
(Colombia) JS Cabal (Colombia) R Farah	6^{5}	6	[7]
3	(South Africa) R Klaasen (Brazil) M Melo	7^{7}	3	[10]

== Qualifying ==
=== Seeds ===
1. (Germany) Andre Begemann / (New Zealand) Artem Sitak (qualifying competition, lucky losers)
2. (United States) Steve Johnson / (United States) Sam Querrey (qualified)

=== Qualifiers ===
1. (United States) Steve Johnson / (United States) Sam Querrey

=== Lucky losers ===
1. (Germany) Andre Begemann / (New Zealand) Artem Sitak

=== Qualifying draw ===
First round
1	(Germany) Andre Begemann (New Zealand) Artem Sitak	6	6
WC	(Japan) Hiroki Moriya (Japan) Takao Suzuki	0	1
(United States) Nicholas Monroe (United States) Donald Young	5	6^{2}
2	(United States) Steve Johnson (United States) Sam Querrey	7	7

Qualifying competition
1	(Germany) Andre Begemann (New Zealand) Artem Sitak	4	6	[7]
2	(United States) Steve Johnson (United States) Sam Querrey	6	3	[10]
