= Alberto Giraudo =

Italian tennis player and coach

- Country (sports): Italy
- Born: 27 June 1983 (age 41)
- Plays: Left-handed
- Prize money: $34,287

Singles
- Career record: 0–0 (at ATP Tour level, Grand Slam level, and in Davis Cup)
- Career titles: 0
- Highest ranking: No. 495 (4 August 2008)

Doubles
- Career record: 0–1 (at ATP Tour level, Grand Slam level, and in Davis Cup)
- Career titles: 0
- Highest ranking: No. 630 (7 July 2008)
- Last updated on: 28 November 2016.

Alberto Giraudo (born 27 June 1983) is a tennis coach and retired Italian tennis player.

Giraudo has a career high ATP singles ranking of 495 achieved on 4 August 2008. He also has a career high ATP doubles ranking of 630 achieved on 7 July 2008.

Giraudo made his ATP main draw debut at the 2015 Generali Open Kitzbühel in the doubles draw partnering Fabio Fognini.
