= 2015 ATP World Tour Finals =

- Date: 15–22 November
- Edition: 46th (singles) / 41st (doubles)
- Category: ATP World Tour Finals
- Draw: 8S/8D
- Prize money: $7,000,000
- Surface: Hard / indoor
- Location: London, United Kingdom
- Venue: The O_{2} Arena

Champions

Singles
- (Serbia) Novak Djokovic

Doubles
- (Netherlands) Jean-Julien Rojer / (Romania) Horia Tecău
- ATP World Tour Finals

The 2015 ATP World Tour Finals (also known as the 2015 Barclays ATP World Tour Finals for sponsorship reasons) was a men's tennis year-end tournament that was played at the O_{2} Arena in London, United Kingdom, between 15 and 22 November 2015. It was the season-ending event for the best singles players and doubles teams on the 2015 ATP World Tour.

== Finals ==
=== Singles ===
(Serbia) Novak Djokovic defeated (Switzerland) Roger Federer 6–3, 6–4

- It was Djokovic's 11th title of the year and 59th of his career. It was his 5th win at the event, winning in 2008, 2012, 2013, and 2014.

=== Doubles ===
(Netherlands) Jean-Julien Rojer / (Romania) Horia Tecău defeated (India) Rohan Bopanna / (Romania) Florin Mergea 6–4, 6–3

== Tournament ==
The 2015 ATP World Tour Finals took place from 15 to 22 November at the O_{2} Arena in London, United Kingdom. It is the 46th edition of the tournament (41st in doubles). The tournament is run by the Association of Tennis Professionals (ATP) and is part of the 2015 ATP World Tour. The event takes place on indoor hard courts. It serves as the season-ending championships for players on the ATP Tour. The eight players who qualify for the event are split into two groups of four. During this stage, players compete in a round-robin format (meaning players play against all the other players in their group). The two players with the best results in each group progress to the semi-finals, where the winners of a group face the runners-up of the other group. This stage, however, is a knock-out stage. The doubles competition uses the same format.

=== Format ===
The ATP World Tour Finals has a round-robin format, with eight players/teams divided into two groups of four. The eight seeds are determined by the ATP rankings and ATP Doubles Team Rankings on the Monday after the last ATP World Tour tournament of the calendar year. All singles matches are the best of three tie-break sets, including the final. All doubles matches are two sets (no ad) and a Match Tie-break.

=== Group name changes ===
The ATP has announced that the group names will be changed from A and B to that of former champions of the event. In 2015 the groups will be renamed after the first two champions Stan Smith (1970) and Ilie Năstase (1971–73, 75).

== Points and prize money ==
Stage	Singles	Doubles^{1}	Points
Champion	RR + $1,560,000	RR + $245,000	RR + 900
Runner-up	RR + $510,000	RR + $83,000	RR + 400
Round robin win per match	$167,000	$32,000	200
Participation fee RR1	$100,000	$82,000	—N/a
Participation fee RR2	$25,000	—N/a	—N/a
Participation fee RR3	$42,000	—N/a	—N/a
Alternates	$95,000	$32,000	—N/a

- RR is points or prize money won in the round robin stage.
- ^{1} Prize money for doubles is per team.
- An undefeated champion would earn the maximum 1,500 points and $2,228,000 in singles

== Qualification ==
=== Singles ===
Eight players compete at the tournament, with two named alternates. Players receive places in the following order of precedence:

1. First, the top 7 players in the ATP rankings on the Monday after the final tournament of the ATP World Tour, that is, after the 2015 Paris Masters.
2. Second, up to two 2015 Grand Slam tournament winners ranked anywhere 8th–20th, in ranking order
3. Third, the eighth ranked player in the ATP rankings

In the event of this totaling more than 8 players, those lower down in the selection order become the alternates. If further alternates are needed, these players are selected by the ATP.

Provisional rankings are published weekly as the ATP Race to the World Tour Finals, coinciding with the 52-week rolling ATP rankings on the date of selection. Points are accumulated in Grand Slam, ATP World Tour, Davis Cup, ATP Challenger Tour and ITF Futures tournaments from the 52 weeks prior to the selection date, with points from the previous years Tour Finals excluded. Players accrue points across 18 tournaments, usually made up of:

- The 4 Grand Slam tournaments
- The 8 mandatory ATP Masters tournaments
- The best results from any 6 other tournaments that carry ranking points

All players must include the ranking points for mandatory Masters tournaments for which they are on the original acceptance list and for all Grand Slams for which they would be eligible, even if they do not compete (in which case they receive zero points). Furthermore, players who finished 2014 in the world's top 30 are commitment players who must (if not injured) include points for the 8 mandatory Masters tournament regardless of whether they enter, and who must compete in at least 4 ATP 500 tournaments (though the Monte Carlo Masters may count to this total), of which one must take place after the US Open. Zero point scores may also be taken from withdrawals by non-injured players from ATP 500 tournaments according to certain other conditions outlined by the ATP. Beyond these rules, however, a player may substitute his next best tournament result for missed Masters and Grand Slam tournaments.

Players may have their ATP World Tour Masters 1000 commitment be reduced by one tournament, by reaching each of the following milestones:

1. 600 tour level matches (as of 1 January 2015), including matches from Challengers and Futures played before year 2010;
2. 12 years of service;
3. 31 years of age (as of 1 January 2015).

Players must be defined by the ATP as in good standing to avail of the reduced commitment.

=== Doubles ===
Eight teams compete at the tournament, with one named alternates. The eight competing teams receive places according to the same order of precedence as in Singles. The named alternate will be offered first to any unaccepted teams in the selection order, then to the highest ranked unaccepted team, and then to a team selected by the ATP. Points are accumulated in the same competitions as for the Singles tournament. However, for Doubles teams there are no commitment tournaments, so teams are ranked according to their 18 highest points scoring results from any tournaments.

== Qualified players ==
=== Singles ===
#	Players	Points	Tours	Date qualified
1	Novak Djokovic (SRB)	15,285	15	4 June
2	Andy Murray (GBR)	8,470	19	15 August
3	Roger Federer (SUI)	7,340	17	8 September
4	Stan Wawrinka (SUI)	6,500	22	9 September
5	Rafael Nadal (ESP)	4,630	22	18 October
6	Tomáš Berdych (CZE)	4,620	21	18 October
7	David Ferrer (ESP)	4,305	19	31 October
8	Kei Nishikori (JPN)	4,035	20	31 October

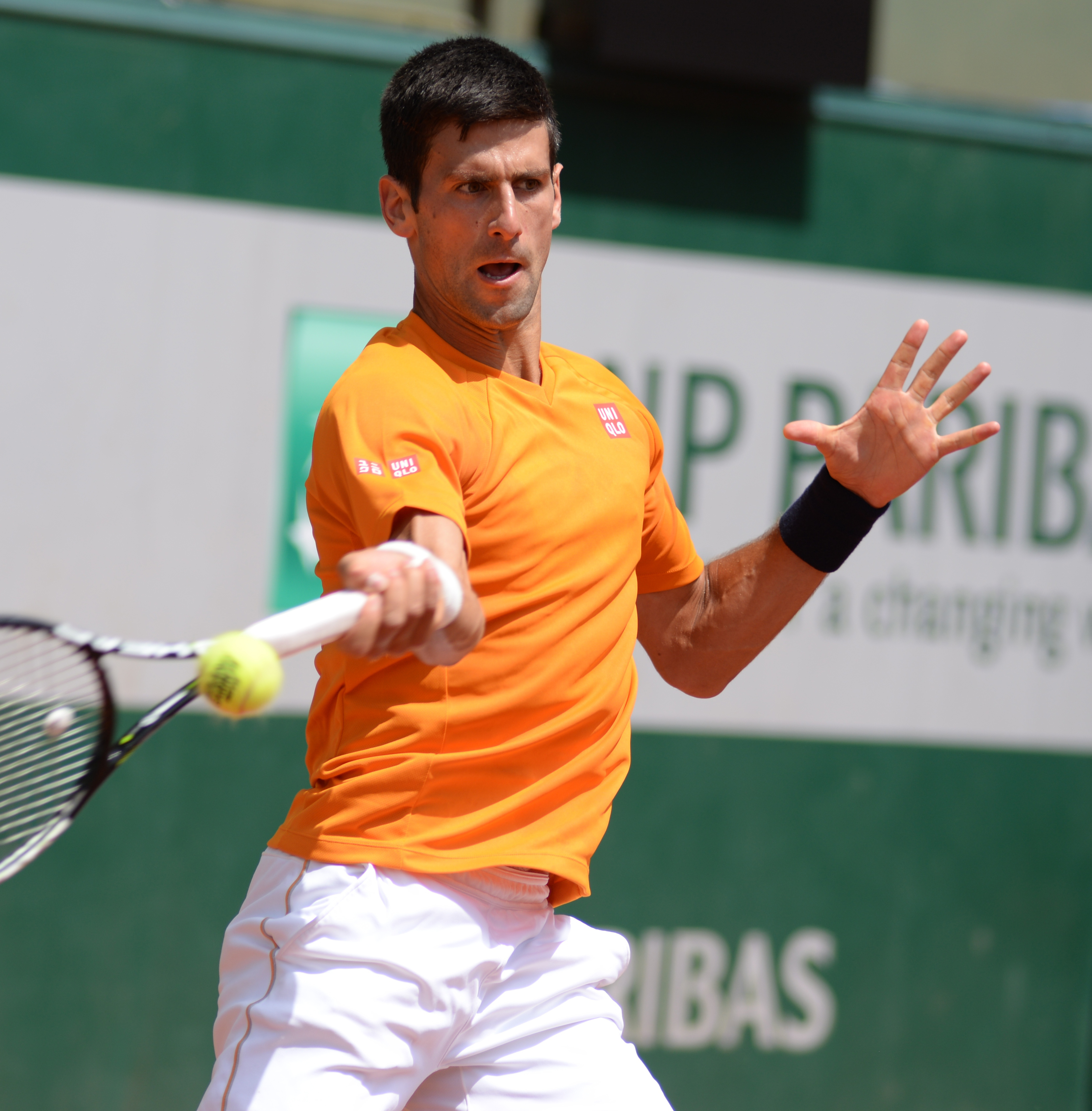
Novak Djokovic won 3 of the slams in 2015.

On 4 June 2015, Novak Djokovic was announced as the tournament's first qualifier upon reaching the semi-finals of the 2015 French Open.

Novak Djokovic began his season in Qatar ExxonMobil Open, where he reached the quarterfinals before losing to Ivo Karlović in a tight three set match. He then went on to reach the final of every subsequent tournament he played, beginning with reclaiming the Australian Open title, defeating Andy Murray in four sets to become the first man in the Open Era to win five titles in Melbourne. After losing the final in Dubai Tennis Championships to Roger Federer, Djokovic went on a 28-match winning streak, first leading Serbia to the quarterfinals of the Davis Cup before winning the first three Masters 1000 titles of the year at the BNP Paribas Open, Miami Open and Monte-Carlo Rolex Masters, beating Federer, Murray and Tomáš Berdych respectively in the finals.

After skipping Madrid, he successfully defended his title at the Rome Masters, defeating Federer in the final once again. At the French Open, Djokovic once again made it to the final, defeating Murray en route in a gruelling 5-set thriller in the semi-finals. Ultimately he lost the final to Stan Wawrinka, denying the Serb a first title in Paris and a Career Grand Slam. He quickly rebounded to win his third Wimbledon title, defeating Federer in the final for the second year in a row to successfully defend his title. In the first tournament of the US Open Series, Djokovic made it to the final of the Canada Masters for only the fourth time, making it to the final before losing to Murray in what was his first loss in nine encounters with the Scot. The next week, at the Western & Southern Open, Djokovic made it to the finals for the fifth time, but was once again defeated, this time by Roger Federer. This was the fifth time that Djokovic had been defeated in the finals of Cincinnati, the only ATP World Tour Masters 1000 title he has never won.

At the final slam of the year, the US Open, Djokovic was victorious, defeating Roger Federer in the finals. This victory meant Djokovic won 3 of the 4 Grand Slams in 2015; this is the second time he achieved this feat in his career, the other year being 2011 Novak Djokovic Tennis Season. In making it to the final, Djokovic reached the final of all 4 Grand Slams this year, achieving this feat for the first time in his career. After his US Open victory, Djokovic continued his triumph by winning the China Open defeating Rafael Nadal in the finals, thus extending his winning streak to 12 and extended his winning streak to 30 matches won in a row in Beijing, where he has never lost in his six appearances. Djokovic then ventured to the Shanghai Rolex Masters as a three-time champion he was once again victorious, defeating Jo Wilfried Tsonga in the final. This marked the fifth Masters 1000 title of the year for Djokovic, tying the record for most Masters 1000 titles won in a single season. In the next tournament, the Paris Masters, Djokovic made history by winning his sixth Masters in 2015, the most Masters anyone has won in a single season with his victory over Andy Murray. His Masters 1000 tally was increased to 26, putting him one shy of Rafael Nadal who holds the record with 27. Djokovic is set to make his ninth consecutive appearance at the season finale.

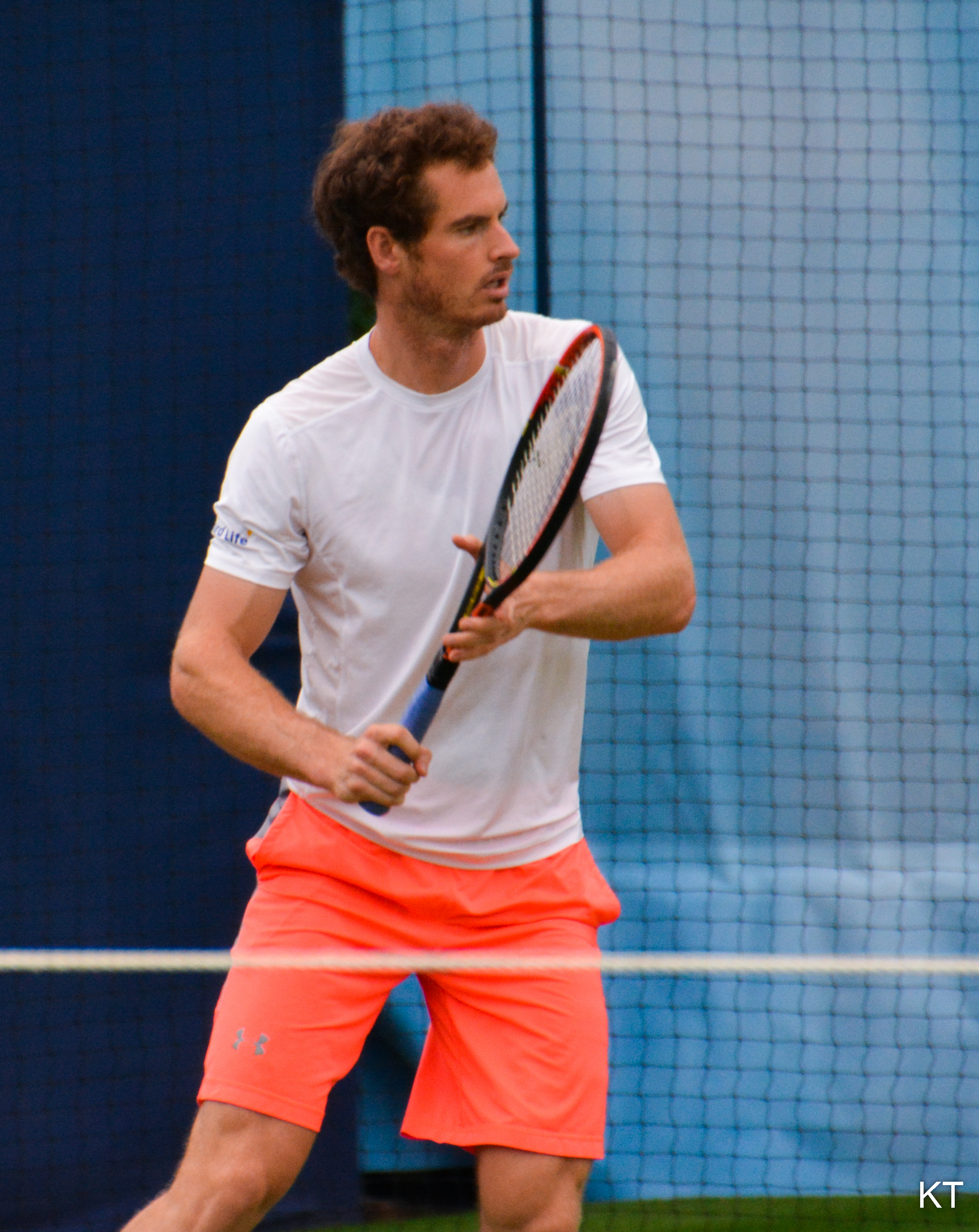
Andy Murray won his first masters in clay in Madrid.

On 15 August, Andy Murray became the second player to qualify on 15 August, during his victorious campaign at the Rogers Cup.

Andy Murray opened his campaign at the Hopman Cup, where he was partnered by Heather Watson. The Brits finished their group second behind Poland, despite being level on ties and matches won, however Murray won each of his singles matches against Benoît Paire, Jerzy Janowicz and Marinko Matosevic respectively. Murray's first competitive tournament of the year was the Australian Open, where he made it to the final for the fourth time, however lost to Novak Djokovic, becoming the first man in the Open Era to lose four Australian Open finals. After quarterfinal losses in both ABN AMRO World Tennis Tournament and Dubai Tennis Championships to Gilles Simon and Borna Ćorić respectively, Murray made it to the semi-finals in BNP Paribas Open, and his fourth final in Miami Open, losing to Djokovic in both instances.

He then went on to have his most successful clay court season to date, reaching his first ever final on clay at the BMW Open in Munich. He defeated home favourite Philipp Kohlschreiber in the final to claim the first clay title of his career. This was followed up by reaching his first Masters 1000 final on clay, defeating three top 10 opponents in succession for the first time on clay, including a first clay court victory over Rafael Nadal, to win the title at the Madrid Open for the first time since 2008. Murray withdrew prior to his third round match against David Goffin in Rome Masters, citing fatigue, before reaching his third semi-final at the French Open, losing again to Djokovic in a thrilling five-set encounter. Murray began his grass court season by winning his fourth title at the Queen's Club, joining John McEnroe, Lleyton Hewitt and Andy Roddick for the most titles at the tournament in the Open Era. He made it to the semi-finals at Wimbledon, losing to Roger Federer in straight sets.

He then returned to the Queen's Club for the Davis Cup Quarterfinals, where he won both his singles and the doubles rubber against France to lead Great Britain to the semi-finals of the Davis Cup for the first time since 1981. Murray began the US Open Series by winning the Rogers Cup for the third time, defeating Djokovic for the first time since his historic triumph at the 2013 Wimbledon final. However, he fell in the semi-finals of the Western & Southern Open to Federer. At the US Open, he suffered a surprising loss to South African Kevin Anderson in the fourth round. In his next two events the Shanghai Rolex Masters and BNP Paribas Masters, he lost Djokovic in the semi-finals and finals respectively. This is the eighth time Murray has qualified for the year-end championships, set to make his seventh appearance.

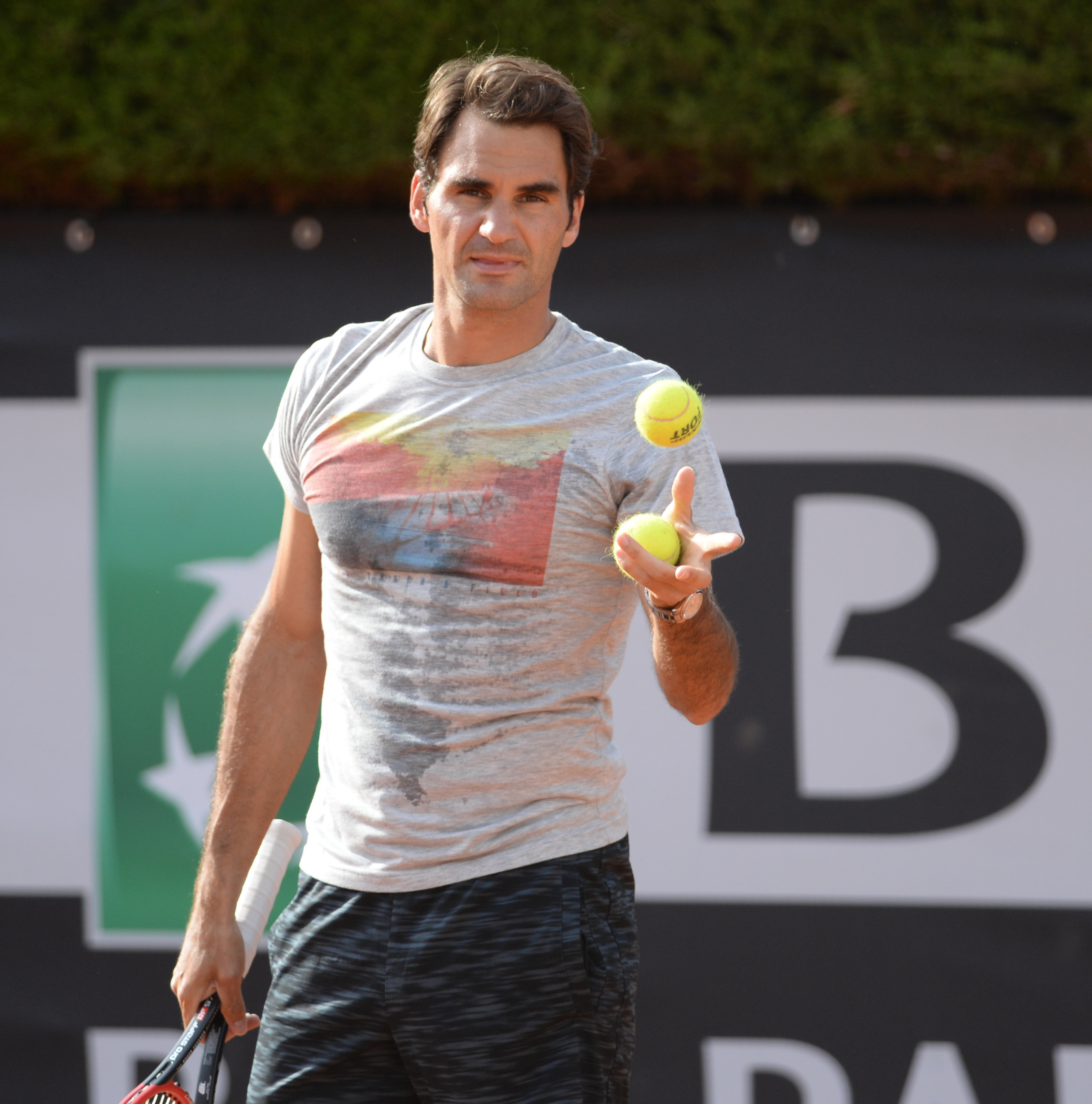
Roger Federer lost back-to-back slam finals in 2015.

On 8 September, Following his run to the US Open final, Roger Federer became the third man to qualify.

Roger Federer made a winning start to his 2015 season, winning the title at the Brisbane International, defeating Milos Raonic in three tight sets the final. He couldn't carry the momentum into the Australian Open however, losing in the third round against Andreas Seppi, bringing to an end his record streak of 11 consecutive semi-final appearances in Melbourne. Federer rebounded well in the Dubai Tennis Championships reaching his second final of the season, and subsequently defeating Novak Djokovic to win the title in Dubai for the unprecedented seventh time. After skipping the first round of the Davis Cup, Federer reached the final in Indian Wells for a record sixth time, however lost to Djokovic in three sets.

After an early exit in Monte-Carlo Rolex Masters against Gaël Monfils, Federer won the third title of his season, at the inaugural Istanbul Open, defeating Pablo Cuevas in the final. An opening round loss to Nick Kyrgios in Mutua Madrid Open was followed by reaching another final in Rome Masters, losing again to Djokovic, this time in straight sets. At the French Open he made the quarterfinals, losing to eventual champion Stan Wawrinka in straight sets. During the grass court season, Federer won a record eighth title in Gerry Weber Open, defeating Seppi in the final. Next, he competed at Wimbledon, where he was defeated by Djokovic in the final.

Federer's next tournament was the Western & Southern Open, he was victorious in the final, defeating Djokovic to win his 24th Masters 1000 title. In his next tournament, the Shanghai Rolex Masters, Federer entered as the defending champion. However, he was defeated in the first round by Albert Ramos Vinolas. After his shock defeat, Federer entered the Swiss Indoors as the defending champion. Here, he was victorious over Rafael Nadal in the pair's first meeting since the Australian Open in 2014. This marked the first time that Federer has beaten Nadal since 2012 BNP Paribas Open. After his Basel victory, Federer entered the Paris Masters. However, he was defeated by John Isner in the third round. This is the 14th consecutive time that Federer has qualified for the ATP World Tour Finals.

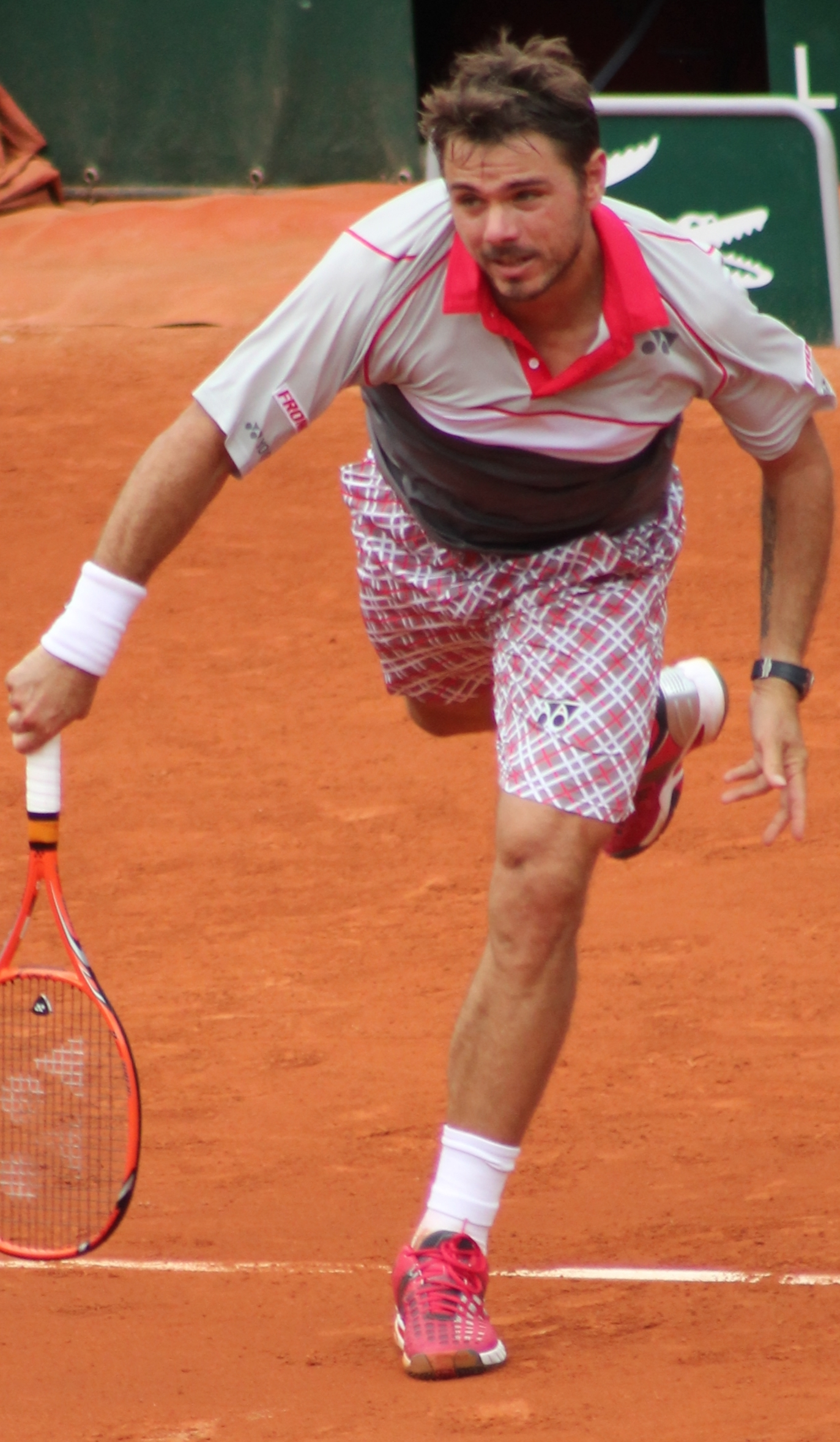
Stan Wawrinka claimed his second slam at Roland Garros.

On 9 September, Stan Wawrinka qualified for the third time.

Stan Wawrinka began the year by successfully defending his title at the Aircel Chennai Open against Aljaž Bedene. Coming in as the defending champion at the Australian Open, he was unable to lift the title when he lost to Novak Djokovic in the semi-finals after losing the fifth set in a bagel. However, he bounced back by winning the Rotterdam Open defeating Czech Tomáš Berdych in three tight sets. However, following early success in the season, Wawrinka suffered a drought failing to win back-to-back in his next four events, the BNP Paribas Open, Miami Masters, Monte-Carlo Rolex Masters and Mutua Madrid Open. He was able to bounce back at the Rome Masters reaching the semi-finals before losing to compatriot Roger Federer. Despite his mixed results during the clay season, he was able to capture the biggest clay title and his second grand slam title at the French Open, when he upset world no. 1 Djokovic, ending the Serbians winning streak in the process as well. He then played at Queen's Club Championships losing to eventual runner-up Anderson. He followed it up with a decent showing at Wimbledon, reaching his second quarterfinal at the event losing to Richard Gasquet 11–9 in the fifth set.

At the US Open Series, he retired in his first match against Nick Kyrgios at the Rogers Cup and reached the quarterfinals of the Western & Southern Open losing to Federer. At the US Open, Wawrinka continued his good form at the slams, when he reached the semi-finals but once again he lost to his compatriot Federer in three quick sets. He won his fourth title of the year at the Rakuten Japan Open Tennis Championships defeating France's Benoît Paire in the final. At the Shanghai Rolex Masters he lost to Rafael Nadal in the quarterfinals. Back at Europe, Wawrinka suffered an upset loss at his home tournament Swiss Indoors losing to Ivo Karlović in the first round. At the BNP Paribas Masters, he suffered another loss to Djokovic in the semi-finals this time. This is Wawrinka's third time at the event having reached back-to-back semi-finals.

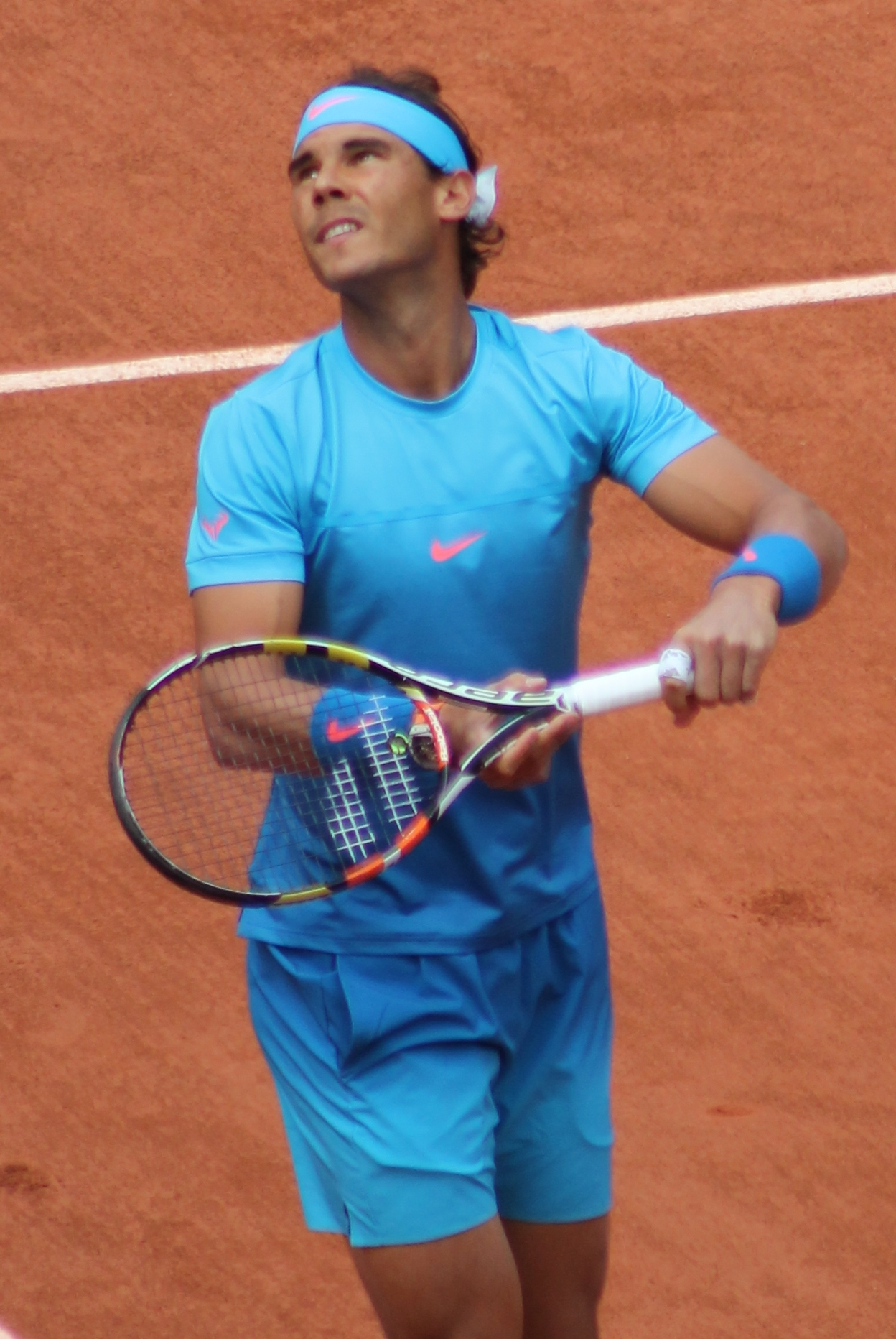
Rafael Nadal suffered only his second loss at Roland Garros

On 18 October, Rafael Nadal and Tomáš Berdych took the next two spots.

Rafael Nadal began the year as the defending Champion at the Qatar Total Open, but suffered a shocking three set defeat to Michael Berrer in the first round. He won the doubles title with Juan Mónaco. At the Australian Open, Nadal lost in straight sets to Tomáš Berdych in the quarterfinal, thus ending a 17-match winning streak against the seventh-seeded Czech. He then competed at South American clay swing. He began with the Rio Open but lost in the semi-finals to Fabio Fognini. He then claimed his first title of the year and his 46th career clay-court title against Juan Mónaco at the Argentina Open. Nadal then participated at the BNP Paribas Open and Miami Open but suffered early defeats to Milos Raonic and Fernando Verdasco, in the quarterfinals and third round respectively. Nadal then began his spring clay season at the Monte Carlo Rolex Masters and reached the semi-finals where he lost to Novak Djokovic in straight sets. After losing to Fognini again at the Barcelona Open quarterfinals, Nadal entered the Madrid Open as the two-time defending champion but lost in the final to Andy Murray in straight sets, resulting in his dropping out of the top five for the first time since 2005. In the Rome Masters, he lost to Stan Wawrinka in the quarterfinals. Nadal came into the French Open at the five time defending but lost to eventual runner-up Djokovic in the quarterfinals, ending his winning streak of 39 consecutive victories in Paris since his defeat by Robin Söderling in 2009. Nadal went on to win the Mercedes Cup against Serbian Viktor Troicki, his first grass court title since he won at Wimbledon in 2010.He was unable to continue his good form on grass as he lost in the first round of the Aegon Championships to Alexandr Dolgopolov in three sets and the second round of Wimbledon to Dustin Brown. He won his third title of the year at the German Open defeating Fabio Fognini in the final.

Nadal's US Open Series wasn't that impressive as his best result was a quarterfinal at the Rogers Cup losing to Kei Nishikori. He then followed it up with third round loses at the Western & Southern Open and US Open, losing to Feliciano López and Fognini (despite having won the first two sets), respectively. This early exit ended Nadal's record 10-year streak of winning at least one major. He was able to bounce back at the China Open, reaching the final losing to Djokovic and the semi-finals of the Shanghai Rolex Masters losing to Jo-Wilfried Tsonga. He followed it up with his sixth final of the year at the Swiss Indoors losing to Federer. In his final tournament prior to the event, he fell in the quarterfinals to Wawrinka at the BNP Paribas Masters in two tie-break sets.

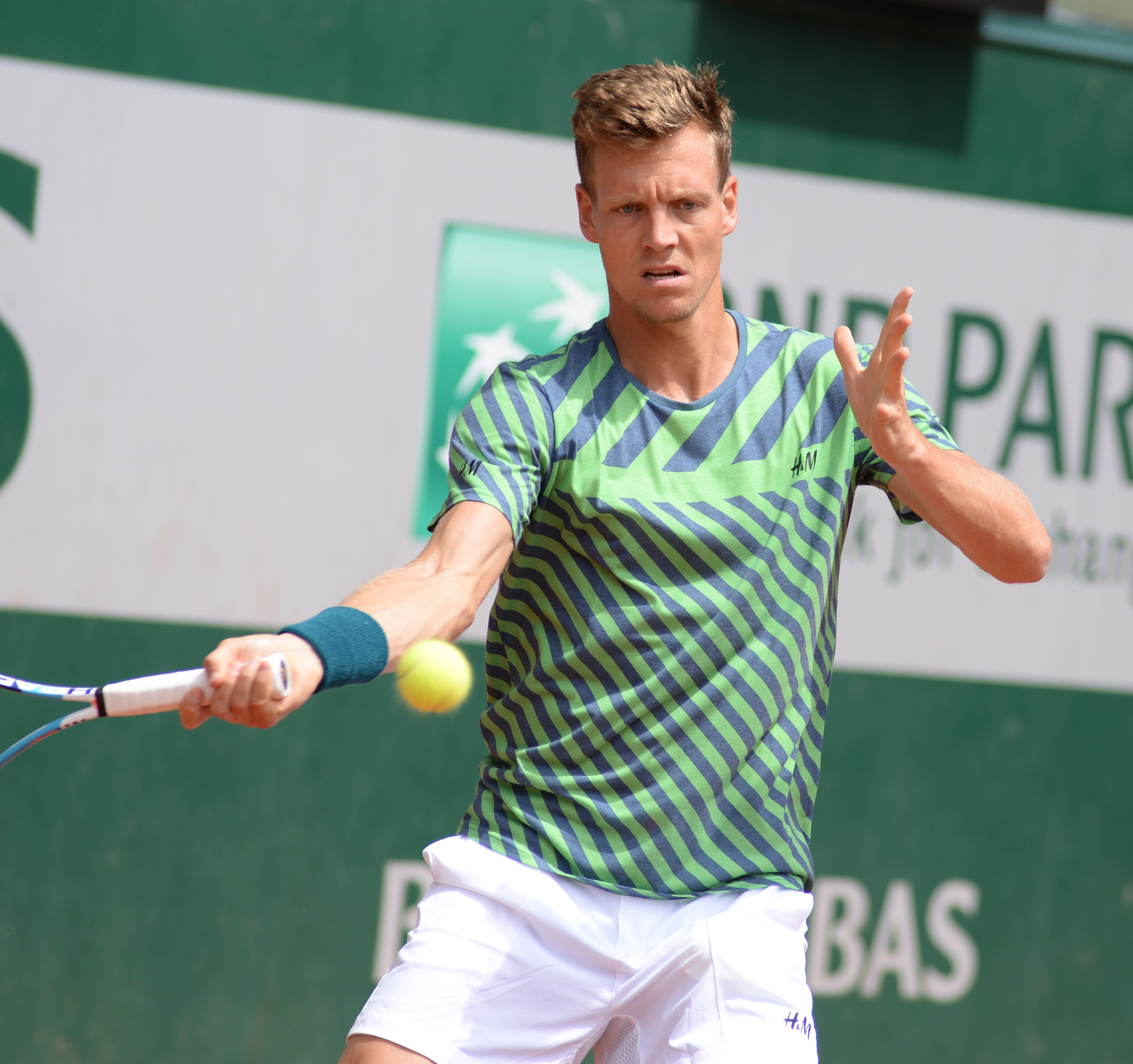
Berdych reached the finals of Monte Carlo

Tomáš Berdych began the year by reaching the final of the Qatar ExxonMobil Open but lost the Spaniard David Ferrer in two tight sets. In the Australian Open, Berdych reached his second Australian Open semi-final, after defeating Rafael Nadal in the quarterfinals and ending his 16 match losing to the Spaniard. Berdych lost in four sets against Andy Murray in the semi-final. In his next event the Rotterdam Open, as the defending champion, he lost to Stan Wawrinka in three sets in the final. He followed it up with a semi-final appearance at the Dubai Tennis Championships losing to Novak Djokovic. Berdych lost his first quarterfinal of the year at the BNP Paribas Open, falling to Roger Federer. At the Miami Masters, Berdych reached the semi-finals, but lost to Andy Murray. Berdych then participated in the 2015 Monte-Carlo Rolex Masters, in which he defeated Gaël Monfils and Milos Raonic to reach the final, but eventually lost to Novak Djokovic. At the Mutua Madrid Open, Berdych lost in the semi-finals to Rafael Nadal. Following a quarterfinal appearance, the following week at the Rome Masters, Berdych reached a ranking career-best of No. 4. Berdych next competed at the French Open where he suffered his first loss prior to the last 8, when he fell in the fourth round to Jo-Wilfried Tsonga.

Berdych next competed at the Gerry Weber Open where he reached the quarterfinals before losing to Ivo Karlović in three sets. Berdych reached the fourth round of the Wimbledon Championships before losing to Gilles Simon in straight sets. Berdych lost in the second round of the Rogers Cup and the quarterfinals in the Western & Southern Open. Berdych then went on to reach the fourth round of the US Open before losing to Richard Gasquet in four sets after taking the first set. He followed with his first title of the year at the Shenzhen Open, defeating Guillermo García López in the final in straight sets. However, he could not carry his good form to the China Open as he lost in the first round to Pablo Cuevas. However, he made it to the quarterfinals in the Shanghai Masters event. Berdych then went on to win the Stockholm Open title and his 12th ATP World Tour title defeating Jack Sock in the final in straight sets. Berdych made it to the quarterfinals of the BNP Paribas Masters. He then qualified for the event for the sixth year in a row.

On 31 October, David Ferrer and Kei Nishikori became the final two qualifiers.

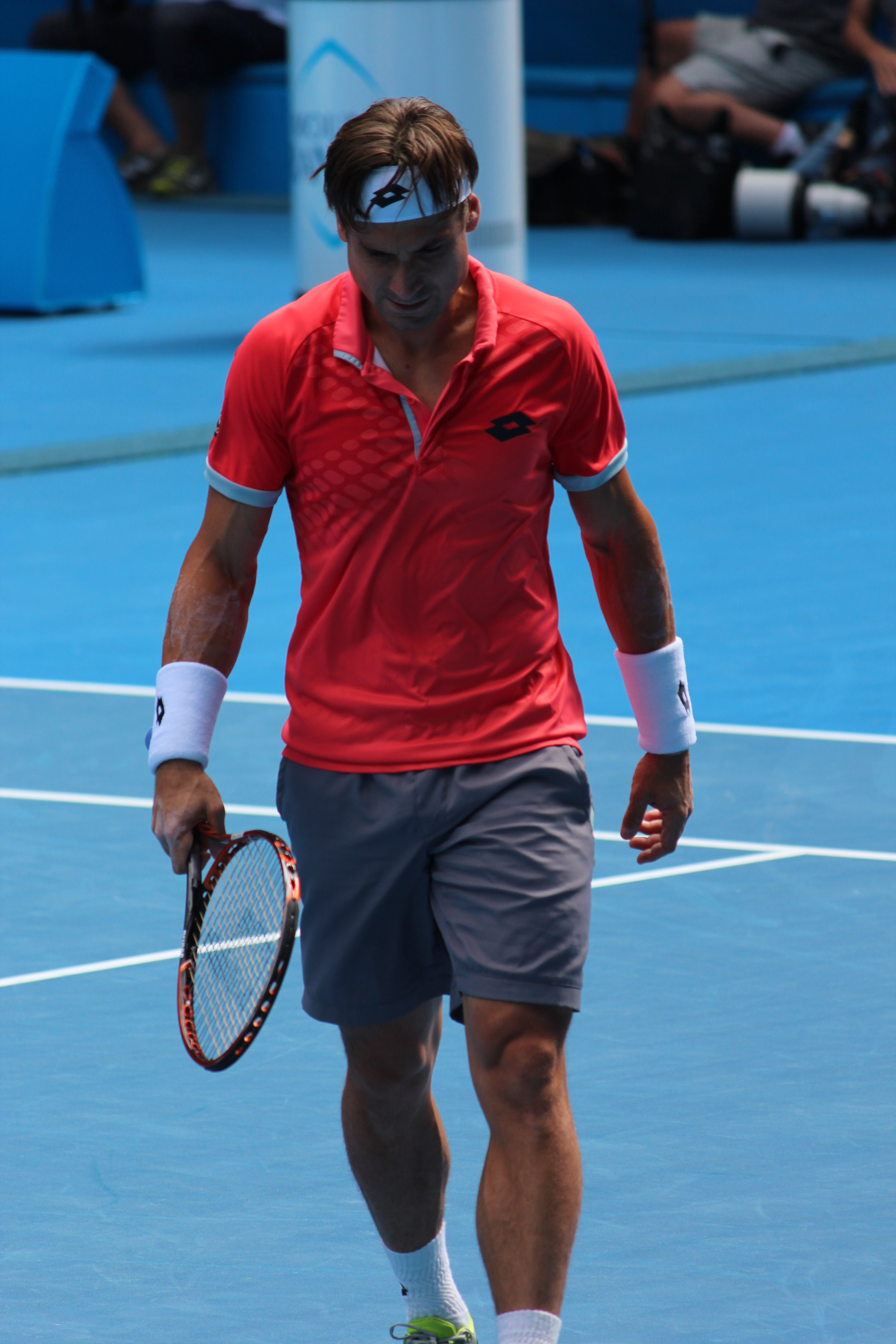
David Ferrer qualified for the seventh time

David Ferrer Ferrer began his season at the Qatar ExxonMobil Open, where he won his 22nd ATP World Tour title by defeating Tomáš Berdych in the final in straight sets. At the 2015 Australian Open, he made it to the fourth round, losing to Kei Nishikori. Ferrer followed that up by winning back-to-back 500 event titles at the Rio Open and Abierto Mexicano Telcel by defeating Fabio Fognini and Kei Nishikori, respectively. At the BNP Paribas Open, he suffered an upset loss to Bernard Tomic in the third round. He was able to reach the quarterfinals of the Miami Masters losing in the quarterfinals to Novak Djokovic. His European clay season was average, being able to reach the quarterfinals of Monte Carlo Rolex Masters and Mutua Madrid Open losing to Rafael Nadal and Nishikori, respectively and the semi-finals of the Barcelona Open and Rome Masters losing to Pablo Andújar and Djokovic, respectively. Ferrer was able to reach the quarterfinals of the French Open before losing to Andy Murray in four sets.

However, Ferrer lost his first match on grass at the Nottingham Open and withdrew from Wimbledon due to an elbow injury. He then came into the US Open with no preparation and lost to Jérémy Chardy in the third round. He bounced back by winning his 25th career title at the Malaysian Open defeating compatriot Feliciano López. At the China Open he lost to Djokovic once again this time in the semi-finals. He was upset again by a lower ranked Tomic in his first match at the Shanghai Rolex Masters. He claimed his fifth title of the year at the Erste Bank Open, defeating Steve Johnson to bring his finals record in the year to 5–0. He followed it up with a semi-final showing at the BNP Paribas Masters falling to Murray.

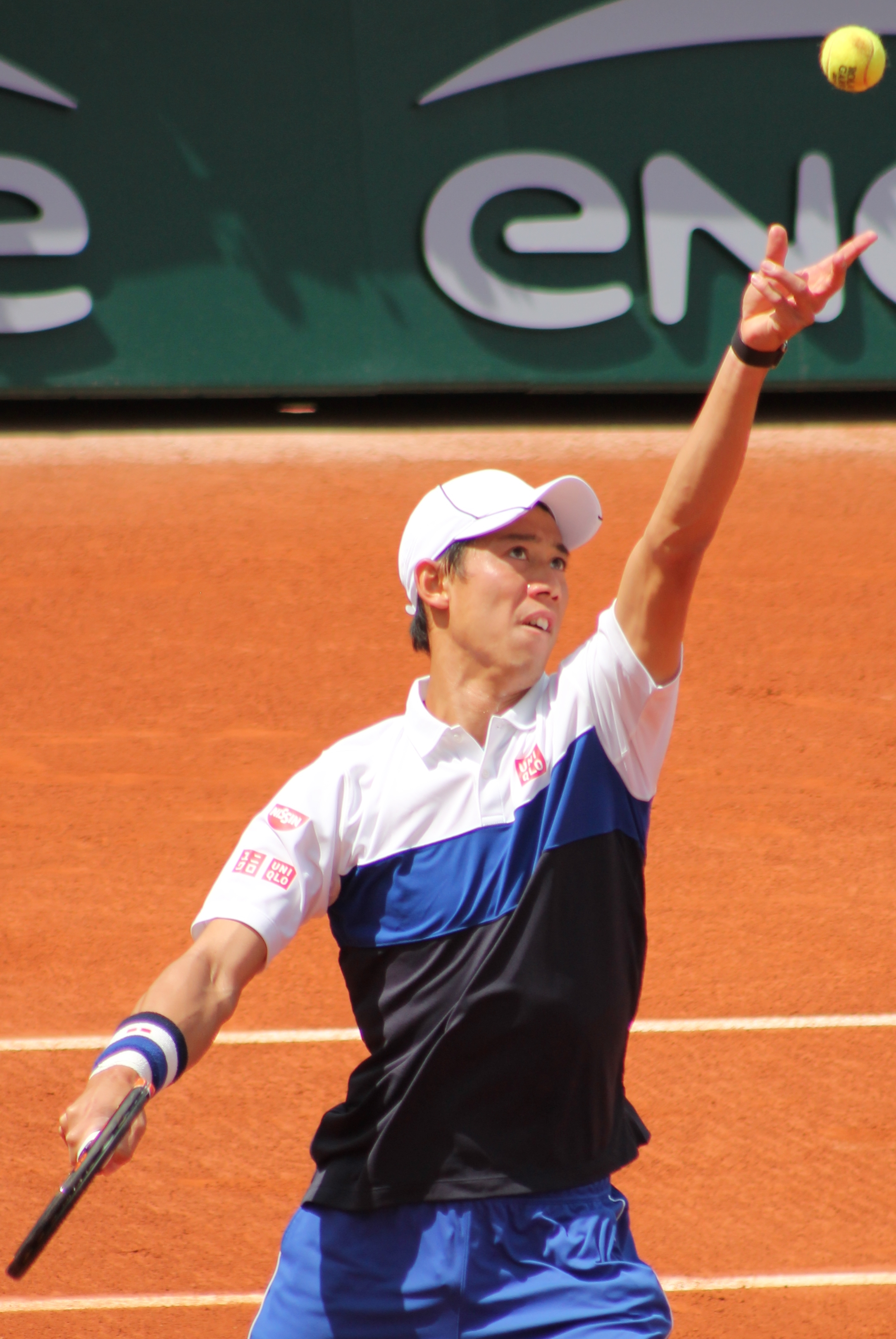
Kei Nishikori qualified for the second time

Kei Nishikori began the 2015 season by participating in the Brisbane International and reached the semi-finals before being beaten by Milos Raonic in 3 tight-set tiebreaks. Nishikori equalled his best record yet in the Australian Open by reaching the quarterfinals, but he was beaten in straight sets by defending champion Stan Wawrinka. Nishikori won his eighth singles title and became the first ever player to win the Memphis Open three times in a row, beating Kevin Anderson in straight sets in the final. He next participated in the Abierto Mexicano Telcel losing to David Ferrer in straight sets in the final but reached a new career high world ranking of No. 4. During the March Masters, he reached the fourth round of the BNP Paribas Open for the first time in seven appearances but was upset by Feliciano López in straight sets in the fourth round. In the Miami Open, he reached the quarterfinals but lost to American John Isner in straight sets.

Nishikori began his clay-court season at the Barcelona Open Banc Sabadell where he defended his title by beating Pablo Andújar in the final in two sets. At the Mutua Madrid Open, Nishikori lost to Andy Murray in the semi-finals. At the Rome Masters, he faced world No. 1 Novak Djokovic in the QF and lost in three sets. Nishikori became the first Japanese man to reach the quarterfinals of the French Open in 82 years but lost to home favorite Jo-Wilfried Tsonga in five set. Nishikori opened his grass-court season by participating in the Halle Open where he reached the semi-finals, only to retire in his match against Andreas Seppi down 1–4 in the first set due to his calf injury which he attained in his quarterfinal match. Nishikori decided to play Wimbledon, but withdrew from his second round match against Santiago Giraldo, due to his calf injury.

Nishikori opened his hard-court season by competing at the Citi Open and reached the final where he beat John Isner in three tight sets to capture his third title of the year. At the Rogers Cup, he reached the semi-finals after defeating Rafael Nadal for the first time in eight tries but ended up losing to Murray. After reaching the final the previous year, He suffered a shocking loss in the first round of the US Open to Benoît Paire. Nishikori started the Asian Fall by participating in his hometown tournament, Rakuten Japan Open, where he reached the semi-finals but lost again to Paire. He reached third rounds of the Shanghai Rolex Masters and BNP Paribas Masters before losing to Kevin Anderson and retiring against Richard Gasquet. Nishikori qualified for the event for the second straight year in a row.

== Contenders point breakdown ==
=== Singles ===
Rankings as of 9 November 2015.

- Players in gold were the qualifiers.
- Player in bold won the title at the finals.
- Players in pink withdrew during the tournament and were replaced by an alternate.
- Players in gray are confirmed alternates.
- Players in white declined the alternate spot.
- Italicized rounds and points indicate that points from another tournament have been substituted into the rankings, following competition regulations.

Rank	Player	Grand Slam				ATP World Tour Masters 1000 (Note: 2015 Monte-Carlo Rolex Masters was not a mandatory tournament, and was counted in the Best Other column instead.)								Best Other						Total points	Tourn
Rank	Player	**AUS**	**FRA**	**WIM**	**USO**	**IW**	**MIA**	**MAD**	**ITA**	**CAN**	**CIN**	**SHA**	**PAR**	1	2	3	4	5	6	Total points	Tourn
1	(Serbia) **Novak Djokovic**	**W** **2000**	F 1200	**W** **2000**	**W** **2000**	**W** **1000**	**W** **1000**	A 0	**W** **1000**	F 600	F 600	**W** **1000**	**W** **1000**	**W** **1000**	**W** **500**	F 300	QF; 45	DC; 40		15,285	17
2	(United Kingdom) Andy Murray	F 1200	SF; 720	SF; 720	R16; 180	SF; 360	F 600	**W** **1000**	R16; 90	**W** **1000**	SF; 360	SF; 360	F 600	**W** **500**	DC; 350	**W** **250**	QF; 90	QF; 90		8,470	19
3	(Switzerland) Roger Federer	R32; 90	QF; 360	F 1200	F 1200	F 600	A 0	R32; 10	F 600	A 0	**W** **1000**	R32; 10	R16; 90	**W** **500**	**W** **500**	**W** **500**	**W** **250**	**W** **250**	R16; 90	7,340	17
4	(Switzerland) Stan Wawrinka	SF; 720	**W** **2000**	QF; 360	SF; 720	R64; 10	R32; 45	R16; 90	SF; 360	R32; 10	QF; 180	QF; 180	SF; 360	**W** **500**	**W** **500**	**W** **250**	R16; 90	DC; 80	R16; 45	6,500	22
5	(Spain) Rafael Nadal	QF; 360	QF; 360	R64; 45	R32; 90	QF; 180	R32; 45	F 600	QF; 180	QF; 180	R16; 90	SF; 360	QF; 180	**W** **500**	SF; 360	F 300	F 300	**W** **250**	**W** **250**	4,630	22
6	(Czech Republic) Tomáš Berdych	SF; 720	R16; 180	R16; 180	R16; 180	QF; 180	SF; 360	SF; 360	QF; 180	R32; 10	QF; 180	QF; 180	QF; 180	F 600	F 300	**W** **250**	**W** **250**	SF; 180	F 150	4,620	21
7	(Spain) David Ferrer	R16; 180	QF; 360	A 0	R32; 90	R32; 45	QF; 180	QF; 180	SF; 360	SF; 180	SF; 180	R32; 10	SF; 360	**W** **500**	**W** **500**	**W** **500**	**W** **250**	**W** **250**	QF; 180	4,305	19
8	(Japan) Kei Nishikori	QF; 360	QF; 360	R64; 45	R128; 10	R16; 90	QF; 180	SF; 360	QF; 180	SF; 360	A 0	R16; 90	R16; 90	**W** **500**	**W** **500**	F 300	**W** **250**	SF; 180	SF; 180	4,035	20
**Alternates**
9	(France) Richard Gasquet	R32; 90	R16; 180	SF; 720	QF; 360	R64; 10	R16; 45	R32; 45	R32; 45	A 0	QF; 180	R16; 90	QF; 180	**W** **250**	**W** **250**	SF; 180	QF; 90	SF; 90	R16; 45	2,850	21
10	(France) Jo-Wilfried Tsonga	A 0	SF; 720	R32; 90	QF; 360	R32; 0	R32; 45	R16; 90	R32; 45	QF; 180	R64; 10	F 600	R16; 90	**W** **250**	R16; 90	R16; 45	R16; 20	R32; 0	DC; 0	2,635	18
11	(United States) John Isner	R32; 90	R64; 45	R32; 90	R16; 180	R16; 90	SF; 360	QF; 180	R16; 90	QF; 180	R64; 10	R16; 90	QF; 180	F 300	**W** **250**	QF; 90	QF; 90	QF; 90	SF; 90	2,495	25

=== Doubles ===
Rankings as of 9 November 2015.

- Teams in gold were the qualifiers.
- Teams in bold won the title at the finals.
- Teams in gray are confirmed alternates.
- Teams in white declined the alternate spot.

Rank	Team	Points																		Total Points	Tourn
Rank	Team	1	2	3	4	5	6	7	8	9	10	11	12	13	14	15	16	17	18	Total Points	Tourn
1	Bob Bryan (USA); Mike Bryan (USA)	F 1200	**W** **1000**	**W** **1000**	**W** **1000**	**W** **500**	QF; 360	**W** **250**	**W** **250**	R16; 180	QF; 180	QF; 180	QF; 180	QF; 90	R16; 90	DC; 50	QF; 45	R16; 0	R16; 0	6,555	21
2	**Jean-Julien Rojer (NED)**; **Horia Tecău (ROU)**	**W** **2000**	SF; 720	SF; 720	QF; 360	**W** **500**	QF; 180	QF; 180	QF; 180	QF; 180	QF; 180	SF; 180	SF; 180	SF; 180	SF; 180	F 150	F 150	R16; 90	QF; 90	6,400	21
3	Ivan Dodig (CRO); Marcelo Melo (BRA)	**W** **2000**	**W** **1000**	SF; 720	**W** **500**	QF; 360	SF; 360	SF; 360	SF; 360	F 300	QF; 180	R16; 0	R16; 0	R64; 0						6,140	13
4	Jamie Murray (GBR); John Peers (AUS)	F 1200	F 1200	**W** **500**	F 325	F 300	F 300	F 300	**W** **250**	R16; 180	R16; 180	QF; 180	QF; 180	QF; 180	QF; 135	R16; 90	SF; 90	QF; 45	R32; 0	5,635	25
5	Simone Bolelli (ITA); Fabio Fognini (ITA)	**W** **2000**	SF; 720	F 600	F 600	F 600	SF; 180	R16; 90	DC; 60	QF; 45	R32; 0	R16; 0	R64; 0	R16; 0	R64; 0	R16; 0	R16; 0			4,895	16
6	Pierre-Hugues Herbert (FRA); Nicolas Mahut (FRA)	**W** **2000**	F 1200	**W** **500**	R16; 180	R16; 180	QF; 180	F 150	F 150	R16; 90	QF; 90	QF; 45	R16; 0	R16; 0	R16; 0					4,765	14
7	Marcin Matkowski (POL); Nenad Zimonjić (SRB)	F 600	F 600	QF; 360	QF; 360	QF; 360	SF; 360	SF; 360	F 300	QF; 180	QF; 180	SF; 180	SF; 180	QF; 90	QF; 90	SF; 90	R32; 0	R16; 0	R32; 0	4,290	19
8	Rohan Bopanna (IND); Florin Mergea (ROU)	**W** **1000**	SF; 720	QF; 360	F 300	**W** **250**	R16; 180	QF; 180	QF; 180	SF; 180	F 150	R16; 90	QF; 45	R32; 0	R16; 0	R16; 0	R16; 0			3,635	16
Alternates
9	Vasek Pospisil (CAN); Jack Sock (USA)	**W** **1000**	F 600	F 600	**W** **500**	QF; 360	R16; 180	QF; 180	R16; 0	R16; 0	R16; 0	R64; 0	R32; 0							3,420	12
10	Alexander Peya (AUT); Bruno Soares (BRA)	**W** **500**	QF; 360	QF; 360	SF; 360	**W** **250**	QF; 180	SF; 180	SF; 180	SF; 180	SF; 180	F 150	R32; 90	R16; 90	R16; 90	QF; 90	QF; 90	SF; 90	R32; 0	3,420	25

== Head-to-head ==
2015 ATP World Tour Finals – Singles

		Djokovic	Murray	Federer	Wawrinka	Nadal	Berdych	Ferrer	Nishikori	Overall	YTD W–L
1	Novak Djokovic (SRB)		21–9	21–21	19–4	22–23	20–2	16–5	4–2	123–66	78–5
2	Andy Murray (GBR)	9–21		11–14	8–6	6–15	7–6	11–6	5–1	57–69	68–12
3	Roger Federer (SUI)	21–21	14–11		17–3	11–23	14–6	16–0	3–2	96–66	59–10
4	Stan Wawrinka (SUI)	4–19	6–8	3–17		3–13	11–5	6–7	3–1	36–70	53–16
5	Rafael Nadal (ESP)	23–22	15–6	23–11	13–3		19–4	23–6	7–1	123–53	58–19
6	Tomáš Berdych (CZE)	2–20	6–7	6–14	5–11	4–19		5–8	1–3	29–82	57–19
7	David Ferrer (ESP)	5–16	6–11	0–16	7–6	6–23	8–5		4–8	36–85	55–13
8	Kei Nishikori (JPN)	2–4	1–5	2–3	1–3	1–7	3–1	8–4		18–27	53–14

=== Indoor hardcourt head-to-head ===
		Djokovic	Murray	Federer	Wawrinka	Nadal	Berdych	Ferrer	Nishikori	Overall	YTD W–L
1	Novak Djokovic (SRB)		3–0	4–3	7–1	3–2	8–0	1–2	2–1	28–9	6–0
2	Andy Murray (GBR)	0–3		2–5	1–0	1–2	2–1	4–1	0–1	9–13	10–2
3	Roger Federer (SUI)	3–4	5–2		4–0	5–1	1–0	6–0	2–0	26–6	8–1
4	Stan Wawrinka (SUI)	1–7	0–1	0–4		1–2	3–3	2–1	0–0	7–18	11–3
5	Rafael Nadal (ESP)	2–3	2–1	1–5	2–1		2–0	1–2	0–0	10–12	7–2
6	Tomáš Berdych (CZE)	0–8	1–2	0–1	3–3	0–2		2–4	0–1	6–21	10–3
7	David Ferrer (ESP)	2–1	1–4	0–6	1–2	2–1	4–2		0–2	10–18	14–1
8	Kei Nishikori (JPN)	1–2	1–0	0–2	0–0	0–0	1–0	2–0		5–4	7–1

== Groupings ==
=== Singles ===
Stan Smith Group	Ilie Năstase Group
Novak Djokovic	Andy Murray
Roger Federer	Stan Wawrinka
Tomáš Berdych	Rafael Nadal
Kei Nishikori	David Ferrer

=== Doubles ===
Ashe/Smith Group	Fleming/McEnroe Group
Bob Bryan / Mike Bryan	Jean-Julien Rojer / Horia Tecău
Jamie Murray / John Peers	Ivan Dodig / Marcelo Melo
Simone Bolelli / Fabio Fognini	Pierre-Hugues Herbert / Nicolas Mahut
Rohan Bopanna / Florin Mergea	Marcin Matkowski / Nenad Zimonjić

== Day-by-day-summaries ==
=== Day 1 (15 November 2015) ===
Matches
Event	Winner	Loser	Score
Singles – Group Stan Smith	(Serbia) Novak Djokovic [1]	(Japan) Kei Nishikori [8]	6–1, 6–1
Doubles – Group Ashe/Smith	(United Kingdom) Jamie Murray (Australia) John Peers [4]	(Italy) Simone Bolelli (Italy) Fabio Fognini [5]	7–6^{(7–5)}, 3–6, [11–9]
Doubles – Group Ashe/Smith	(India) Rohan Bopanna (Romania) Florin Mergea [8]	(United States) Bob Bryan (United States) Mike Bryan [1]	6–4, 6–3
Singles – Group Stan Smith	(Switzerland) Roger Federer [3]	(Czech Republic) Tomáš Berdych [6]	6–4, 6–2

=== Day 2 (16 November 2015) ===
Matches
Event	Winner	Loser	Score
Doubles – Group Fleming/McEnroe	(Netherlands) Jean-Julien Rojer (Romania) Horia Tecău [2]	(Poland) Marcin Matkowski (Serbia) Nenad Zimonjić [7]	6–2, 6–4
Singles – Group Ilie Năstase	(United Kingdom) Andy Murray [2]	(Spain) David Ferrer [7]	6–4, 6–4
Doubles – Group Fleming/McEnroe	(Croatia) Ivan Dodig (Brazil) Marcelo Melo [3]	(France) Pierre-Hugues Herbert (France) Nicolas Mahut [6]	3–6, 7–6^{(7–4)}, [10–7]
Singles – Group Ilie Năstase	(Spain) Rafael Nadal [5]	(Switzerland) Stan Wawrinka [4]	6–3, 6–2

=== Day 3 (17 November 2015) ===
Matches
Event	Winner	Loser	Score
Doubles – Group Ashe/Smith	(India) Rohan Bopanna (Romania) Florin Mergea [8]	(United Kingdom) Jamie Murray (Australia) John Peers [4]	6–3, 7–6^{(7–5)}
Singles – Group Stan Smith	(Japan) Kei Nishikori [8]	(Czech Republic) Tomáš Berdych [6]	7–5, 3–6, 6–3
Doubles – Group Ashe/Smith	(United States) Bob Bryan (United States) Mike Bryan [1]	(Italy) Simone Bolelli (Italy) Fabio Fognini [5]	6–3, 6–2
Singles – Group Stan Smith	(Switzerland) Roger Federer [3]	(Serbia) Novak Djokovic [1]	7–5, 6–2

=== Day 4 (18 November 2015) ===
Matches
Event	Winner	Loser	Score
Doubles – Group Fleming/McEnroe	(France) Pierre-Hugues Herbert (France) Nicolas Mahut [6]	(Poland) Marcin Matkowski (Serbia) Nenad Zimonjić [7]	5–7, 6–3, [10–8]
Singles – Group Ilie Năstase	(Spain) Rafael Nadal [5]	(United Kingdom) Andy Murray [2]	6–4, 6–1
Doubles – Group Fleming/McEnroe	(Netherlands) Jean-Julien Rojer (Romania) Horia Tecău [2]	(Croatia) Ivan Dodig (Brazil) Marcelo Melo [3]	6–4, 7–6^{(7–3)}
Singles – Group Ilie Năstase	(Switzerland) Stan Wawrinka [4]	(Spain) David Ferrer [7]	7–5, 6–2

=== Day 5 (19 November 2015) ===
Matches
Event	Winner	Loser	Score
Doubles – Group Ashe/Smith	(Italy) Simone Bolelli (Italy) Fabio Fognini [5]	(India) Rohan Bopanna (Romania) Florin Mergea [8]	6–4, 1–6, [10–5]
Singles – Group Stan Smith	(Switzerland) Roger Federer [3]	(Japan) Kei Nishikori [8]	7–5, 4–6, 6–4
Doubles – Group Ashe/Smith	(United States) Bob Bryan (United States) Mike Bryan [1]	(United Kingdom) Jamie Murray (Australia) John Peers [4]	6–7^{(5–7)}, 7–6^{(7–5)}, [16–14]
Singles – Group Stan Smith	(Serbia) Novak Djokovic [1]	(Czech Republic) Tomáš Berdych [6]	6–3, 7–5

=== Day 6 (20 November 2015) ===
Matches
Event	Winner	Loser	Score
Doubles – Group Fleming/McEnroe	(Croatia) Ivan Dodig (Brazil) Marcelo Melo [3]	(Poland) Marcin Matkowski (Serbia) Nenad Zimonjić [7]	3–6, 7–5, [10–6]
Singles – Group Ilie Năstase	(Spain) Rafael Nadal [5]	(Spain) David Ferrer [7]	6–7^{(2–7)}, 6–3, 6–4
Doubles – Group Fleming/McEnroe	(Netherlands) Jean-Julien Rojer (Romania) Horia Tecău [2]	(France) Pierre-Hugues Herbert (France) Nicolas Mahut [6]	6–4, 7–5
Singles – Group Ilie Năstase	(Switzerland) Stan Wawrinka [4]	(United Kingdom) Andy Murray [2]	7–6^{(7–4)}, 6–4

=== Day 7 (21 November 2015) ===
Matches
Event	Winner	Loser	Score
Doubles – Semi-finals	(India) Rohan Bopanna (Romania) Florin Mergea [8]	(Croatia) Ivan Dodig (Brazil) Marcelo Melo [3]	6–4, 6–2
Singles – Semi-finals	(Serbia) Novak Djokovic [1]	(Spain) Rafael Nadal [5]	6–3, 6–3
Doubles – Semi-finals	(Netherlands) Jean-Julien Rojer (Romania) Horia Tecău [2]	(United States) Bob Bryan (United States) Mike Bryan [1]	6–4, 6–4
Singles – Semi-finals	(Switzerland) Roger Federer [3]	(Switzerland) Stan Wawrinka [4]	7–5, 6–3

=== Day 8 (22 November 2015) ===
Matches
Event	Winner	Loser	Score
Doubles – Final	(Netherlands) Jean-Julien Rojer (Romania) Horia Tecău [2]	(India) Rohan Bopanna (Romania) Florin Mergea [8]	6–4, 6–3
Singles – Final	(Serbia) Novak Djokovic [1]	(Switzerland) Roger Federer [3]	6–3, 6–4

== See also ==
- ATP rankings
- 2015 WTA Finals
