= 2015 Qatar ExxonMobil Open – Doubles =

Doubles
- 2015 Qatar ExxonMobil Open

Final
- Champions: (Argentina) Juan Mónaco (Spain) Rafael Nadal
- Runners-up: (Austria) Julian Knowle (Austria) Philipp Oswald
- Score: 6–3, 6–4

Details
- Draw: 16
- Seeds: 4

Events
Singles	Doubles
← 2014 ·	ATP Qatar Open	· 2016 →

Tomáš Berdych and Jan Hájek were the defending champions, but they decided not to participate this year.
Juan Mónaco and Rafael Nadal won the title, defeating Julian Knowle and Philipp Oswald in the final, 6–3, 6–4.

== Seeds ==
1. (Austria) Alexander Peya / (Brazil) Bruno Soares (first round, retired because of Peya's left leg injury)
2. (Pakistan) Aisam-ul-Haq Qureshi / (Serbia) Nenad Zimonjić (first round)
3. (Colombia) Juan Sebastián Cabal / (Colombia) Robert Farah (quarterfinals)
4. (Croatia) Ivan Dodig / (Belarus) Max Mirnyi (first round)

== Draw ==
=== Key ===
- Q = Qualifier
- WC = Wild card
- LL = Lucky loser
- Alt = Alternate
- SE = Special exempt
- PR = Protected ranking
- ITF = ITF entry
- JE = Junior exempt
- w/o = Walkover
- r = Retired
- d = Defaulted
- SR = Special ranking

=== Draw ===
First round
1	(Austria) A Peya (Brazil) B Soares	3^{r}
(Germany) B Becker (New Zealand) A Sitak	5
(Italy) S Bolelli (Argentina) L Mayer	3	3
(Argentina) J Mónaco (Spain) R Nadal	6	6
3	(Colombia) JS Cabal (Colombia) R Farah	6	6
(United States) S Lipsky (United States) R Ram	2	0
WC	(Serbia) N Djokovic (Serbia) F Krajinović	6	6
WC	(Qatar) JM Ali Mutawa (Tunisia) M Jaziri	1	4
(United Kingdom) D Inglot (Romania) F Mergea	6	6^{3}	[10]
(Uzbekistan) D Istomin (Russia) M Youzhny	4	7^{7}	[6]
(Spain) D Marrero (Spain) F Verdasco	6	7^{7}
4	(Croatia) I Dodig (Belarus) M Mirnyi	2	6^{2}
(Czech Republic) L Rosol (Ukraine) S Stakhovsky	6	6
(Spain) P Andújar (Italy) A Seppi	2	4
(Austria) J Knowle (Austria) P Oswald	5	7^{7}	[10]
2	(Pakistan) A-u-H Qureshi (Serbia) N Zimonjić	7	6^{5}	[3]

Quarterfinals
(Germany) B Becker (New Zealand) A Sitak	6	3	[6]
(Argentina) J Mónaco (Spain) R Nadal	2	6	[10]
3	(Colombia) JS Cabal (Colombia) R Farah	3	5
WC	(Serbia) N Djokovic (Serbia) F Krajinović	6	7
(United Kingdom) D Inglot (Romania) F Mergea	6	3	[5]
(Spain) D Marrero (Spain) F Verdasco	3	6	[10]
(Czech Republic) L Rosol (Ukraine) S Stakhovsky	3	5
(Austria) J Knowle (Austria) P Oswald	6	7

Semifinals
(Argentina) J Mónaco (Spain) R Nadal	7^{7}	6
WC	(Serbia) N Djokovic (Serbia) F Krajinović	6^{3}	1
(Spain) D Marrero (Spain) F Verdasco	6^{4}	5
(Austria) J Knowle (Austria) P Oswald	7^{7}	7

Final
(Argentina) J Mónaco (Spain) R Nadal	6	6
(Austria) J Knowle (Austria) P Oswald	3	4
