= 2015 ATP World Tour Finals – Singles =

Singles
- 2015 ATP World Tour Finals

Final
- Champion: (Serbia) Novak Djokovic
- Runner-up: (Switzerland) Roger Federer
- Score: 6–3, 6–4

Events
Singles	Doubles
← 2014 ·	ATP World Tour Finals	· 2016 →

Three-time defending champion Novak Djokovic defeated Roger Federer in the final, 6–3, 6–4 to win the singles tennis title at the 2015 ATP Finals. It was his fifth Tour Finals title. With the win, Djokovic became the first player to win the event four consecutive times.

== Seeds ==
1. (Serbia) Novak Djokovic (champion)
2. (United Kingdom) Andy Murray (round robin)
3. (Switzerland) Roger Federer (final)
4. (Switzerland) Stan Wawrinka (semifinals)
5. (Spain) Rafael Nadal (semifinals)
6. (Czech Republic) Tomáš Berdych (round robin)
7. (Spain) David Ferrer (round robin)
8. (Japan) Kei Nishikori (round robin)

== Alternates ==
1. (France) Richard Gasquet (Did not play)
2. (United States) John Isner (Did not play)

== Draw ==
=== Key ===
- Q = Qualifier
- WC = Wild card
- LL = Lucky loser
- Alt = Alternate
- SE = Special exempt
- PR = Protected ranking
- ITF = ITF entry
- JE = Junior exempt
- w/o = Walkover
- r = Retired
- d = Defaulted
- SR = Special ranking

=== Finals ===
Semifinals
3	(Switzerland) Roger Federer	7	6
4	(Switzerland) Stan Wawrinka	5	3
5	(Spain) Rafael Nadal	3	3
1	(Serbia) Novak Djokovic	6	6

Final
3	(Switzerland) Roger Federer	3	4
1	(Serbia) Novak Djokovic	6	6

=== Group Stan Smith ===
		(Serbia) Djokovic	(Switzerland) Federer	(Czech Republic) Berdych	(Japan) Nishikori	RR W–L	Set W–L	Game W–L	Standings
1	(Serbia) Novak Djokovic		5–7, 2–6	6–3, 7–5	6–1, 6–1	2–1	4–2 (66.7%)	32–23 (58.2%)	2
3	(Switzerland) Roger Federer	7–5, 6–2		6–4, 6–2	7–5, 4–6, 6–4	3–0	6–1 (85.7%)	42–28 (60%)	1
6	(Czech Republic) Tomáš Berdych	3–6, 5–7	4–6, 2–6		5–7, 6–3, 3–6	0–3	1–6 (14.3%)	28–41 (40.6%)	4
8	(Japan) Kei Nishikori	1–6, 1–6	5–7, 6–4, 4–6	7–5, 3–6, 6–3		1–2	3–5 (37.5%)	33–43 (43.4%)	3

Standings are determined by: 1. number of wins; 2. number of matches; 3. in two-players-ties, head-to-head records; 4. in three-players-ties, percentage of sets won, then percentage of games won, then head-to-head records; 5. ATP rankings.

=== Group Ilie Năstase ===
		(United Kingdom) Murray	(Switzerland) Wawrinka	(Spain) Nadal	(Spain) Ferrer	RR W–L	Set W–L	Game W–L	Standings
2	(United Kingdom) Andy Murray		6–7^{(4–7)}, 4–6	4–6, 1–6	6–4, 6–4	1–2	2–4 (33.3%)	27–33 (45.0%)	3
4	(Switzerland) Stan Wawrinka	7–6^{(7–4)}, 6–4		3–6, 2–6	7–5, 6–2	2–1	4–2 (66.7%)	31–29 (51.7%)	2
5	(Spain) Rafael Nadal	6–4, 6–1	6–3, 6–2		6–7^{(2–7)}, 6–3, 6–4	3–0	6–1 (85.7%)	42–24 (63.6%)	1
7	(Spain) David Ferrer	4–6, 4–6	5–7, 2–6	7–6^{(7–2)}, 3–6, 4–6		0–3	1–6 (14.3%)	29–43 (40.3%)	4

Standings are determined by: 1. number of wins; 2. number of matches; 3. in two-players-ties, head-to-head records; 4. in three-players-ties, percentage of sets won, then percentage of games won, then head-to-head records; 5. ATP rankings.
