= 2015 Citi Open – Women's doubles =

Women's doubles
- 2015 Citi Open

Final
- Champions: (Switzerland) Belinda Bencic (France) Kristina Mladenovic
- Runners-up: (Spain) Lara Arruabarrena (Slovenia) Andreja Klepač
- Score: 7–5, 7–6^{(9–7)}

Events
Singles	men	women
Doubles	men	women
← 2014 ·	Citi Open	· 2016 →

Shuko Aoyama and Gabriela Dabrowski were the defending champions, but Dabrowski chose to participate in Stanford instead. Aoyama played alongside Eri Hozumi, but lost in the quarterfinals to Lara Arruabarrena and Andreja Klepač who eventually lost in the final to Belinda Bencic and Kristina Mladenovic with the score 7–5, 7–6^{(9–7)}.

== Seeds ==
1. (Russia) Alla Kudryavtseva / (Russia) Anastasia Pavlyuchenkova (semifinals)
2. (Australia) Anastasia Rodionova / (Australia) Arina Rodionova (first round)
3. (Spain) Lara Arruabarrena / (Slovenia) Andreja Klepač (final)
4. (Switzerland) Belinda Bencic / (France) Kristina Mladenovic (champions)

== Draw ==
=== Key ===
- Q = Qualifier
- WC = Wild card
- LL = Lucky loser
- Alt = Alternate
- SE = Special exempt
- PR = Protected ranking
- ITF = ITF entry
- JE = Junior exempt
- w/o = Walkover
- r = Retired
- d = Defaulted
- SR = Special ranking

=== Draw ===
First round
1	(Russia) A Kudryavtseva (Russia) A Pavlyuchenkova	7	6
(France) A Cornet (Poland) M Linette	5	3
WC	(United States) L Chirico (France) A Lim	0	2
(United Kingdom) J Rae (United Kingdom) A Smith	6	6
4	(Switzerland) B Bencic (France) K Mladenovic	7	6
(Romania) I-C Begu (United States) C Vandeweghe	5	2
(Chinese Taipei) C-y Hsu (Japan) H Kuwata	5	7	[5]
(United States) S Marand (United States) T Townsend	7	5	[10]
(Japan) S Aoyama (Japan) E Hozumi	6	6
(Romania) E Bogdan (United Kingdom) N Broady	1	4
(France) J Coin (United States) N Melichar	6	5	[7]
3	(Spain) L Arruabarrena (Slovenia) A Klepač	3	7	[10]
(Belgium) A-S Mestach (Belgium) A Van Uytvanck	1	2
(United States) I Falconi (Romania) M Niculescu	6	6
(Chinese Taipei) C-j Chuang (China) C Liang	6	7
2	(Australia) An Rodionova (Australia) Ar Rodionova	4	5

Quarterfinals
1	(Russia) A Kudryavtseva (Russia) A Pavlyuchenkova	6	6
(United Kingdom) J Rae (United Kingdom) A Smith	1	2
4	(Switzerland) B Bencic (France) K Mladenovic	6	6
(United States) S Marand (United States) T Townsend	2	2
(Japan) S Aoyama (Japan) E Hozumi	3	1
3	(Spain) L Arruabarrena (Slovenia) A Klepač	6	6
(United States) I Falconi (Romania) M Niculescu	6	3	[10]
(Chinese Taipei) C-j Chuang (China) C Liang	4	6	[4]

Semifinals
1	(Russia) A Kudryavtseva (Russia) A Pavlyuchenkova	2	2
4	(Switzerland) B Bencic (France) K Mladenovic	6	6
3	(Spain) L Arruabarrena (Slovenia) A Klepač	w/o
(United States) I Falconi (Romania) M Niculescu

Final
4	(Switzerland) B Bencic (France) K Mladenovic	7	7^{9}
3	(Spain) L Arruabarrena (Slovenia) A Klepač	5	6^{7}
