= 2015 Citi Open – Women's singles =

Women's singles
- 2015 Citi Open

Final
- Champion: (United States) Sloane Stephens
- Runner-up: (Russia) Anastasia Pavlyuchenkova
- Score: 6–1, 6–2

Events
Singles	men	women
Doubles	men	women
← 2014 ·	Citi Open	· 2016 →

Svetlana Kuznetsova was the defending champion, but withdrew from her second round match due to a lower left leg injury.

Sloane Stephens won her first WTA title, defeating Anastasia Pavlyuchenkova in the final, 6–1, 6–2.

== Seeds ==
1. (Russia) Ekaterina Makarova (semifinals, retired)
2. (Australia) Samantha Stosur (semifinals)
3. (Switzerland) Belinda Bencic (second round)
4. (Russia) Svetlana Kuznetsova (second round, withdrew)
5. (France) Alizé Cornet (second round)
6. (Romania) Irina-Camelia Begu (quarterfinals)
7. (United States) Coco Vandeweghe (first round)
8. (Kazakhstan) Zarina Diyas (first round, retired)

== Draw ==
=== Key ===
- Q = Qualifier
- WC = Wild card
- LL = Lucky loser
- Alt = Alternate
- ITF = ITF entry
- PR = Protected ranking
- SR = Special ranking
- SE = Special exempt
- JE = Junior exempt
- JR = Junior Accelerator Programme entrant
- CO = College Accelerator Programme entrant
- NG = Next Gen Accelerator Program entrant
- w/o = Walkover
- r = Retired
- d = Defaulted

=== Finals ===
Semifinals
1	(Russia) Ekaterina Makarova	6	3	0^{r}
(Russia) Anastasia Pavlyuchenkova	4	6	0
(United States) Sloane Stephens	7^{7}	6
2	(Australia) Samantha Stosur	6^{4}	0

Final
(Russia) Anastasia Pavlyuchenkova	1	2
(United States) Sloane Stephens	6	6

=== Top half ===
First round
1	(Russia) E Makarova	7	7
(Belgium) A Van Uytvanck	5	5
Q	(United Kingdom) N Broady	3	7	7^{8}
(Australia) J Gajdošová	6	5	6^{6}
(Slovenia) P Hercog	6	7
Q	(Israel) J Glushko	2	5
(United States) M Brengle	4	0
6	(Romania) I-C Begu	6	6
3	(Switzerland) B Bencic	7	6
(Czech Republic) T Smitková	5	4
(Russia) A Pavlyuchenkova	7^{7}	7^{7}
(Slovakia) M Rybáriková	6^{2}	6^{3}
(Japan) K Nara	6	4	6^{4}
(Kazakhstan) Y Putintseva	4	6	7^{7}
(United States) C McHale	6	4	6
7/WC	(United States) C Vandeweghe	2	6	4

Second round
1	(Russia) E Makarova	6	7^{7}
Q	(United Kingdom) N Broady	4	6^{2}
(Slovenia) P Hercog	6	5	4
6	(Romania) I-C Begu	3	7	6
3	(Switzerland) B Bencic	2	4
(Russia) A Pavlyuchenkova	6	6
(Kazakhstan) Y Putintseva	2	6	5
(United States) C McHale	6	1	7

Quarterfinals
1	(Russia) E Makarova	6	2	6
6	(Romania) I-C Begu	4	6	1
(Russia) A Pavlyuchenkova	2	6	7^{7}
(United States) C McHale	6	1	6^{5}

Semifinals
1	(Russia) E Makarova	6	3	0^{r}
(Russia) A Pavlyuchenkova	4	6	0

=== Bottom half ===
First round
5	(France) A Cornet	6	6
Q	(Belgium) A-S Mestach	3	3
WC	(United States) L Chirico	6	6
(United Kingdom) H Watson	3	0
(United States) S Stephens	6	6
(Poland) M Linette	2	1
Q	(United States) S Marand	2	4
4	(Russia) S Kuznetsova	6	6
8	(Kazakhstan) Z Diyas	5	1^{r}
(United States) L Davis	7	2
(Romania) M Niculescu	7	6
(Spain) L Arruabarrena	5	4
WC	(United States) T Townsend	7^{7}	1	3
(United States) I Falconi	6^{4}	6	6
(France) K Mladenovic	2	2
2	(Australia) S Stosur	6	6

Second round
5	(France) A Cornet	5	6	6^{4}
WC	(United States) L Chirico	7	4	7^{7}
(United States) S Stephens	w/o
4	(Russia) S Kuznetsova
(United States) L Davis	6	1	4
(Romania) M Niculescu	1	6	6
(United States) I Falconi	1	5
2	(Australia) S Stosur	6	7

Quarterfinals
WC	(United States) L Chirico	4	4
(United States) S Stephens	6	6
(Romania) M Niculescu	0^{r}
2	(Australia) S Stosur	4

Semifinals
(United States) S Stephens	7^{7}	6
2	(Australia) S Stosur	6^{4}	0

== Qualifying ==
=== Seeds ===
1. (Belgium) An-Sophie Mestach (qualified)
2. (Russia) Elizaveta Kulichkova (qualifying competition)
3. (Belarus) Aliaksandra Sasnovich (qualifying competition)
4. (Ukraine) Anhelina Kalinina (qualifying competition)
5. (Japan) Eri Hozumi (first round)
6. (Israel) Julia Glushko (qualified)
7. (Australia) Anastasia Rodionova (withdrew)
8. (France) Stéphanie Foretz (first round)

=== Qualifiers ===
1. (Belgium) An-Sophie Mestach
2. (United States) Sanaz Marand
3. (United Kingdom) Naomi Broady
4. (Israel) Julia Glushko

=== Draw ===
==== First qualifier ====
First round
1	(Belgium) An-Sophie Mestach	6	6^{7}	6
(Japan) Hiroko Kuwata	2	7^{9}	1
(Austria) Tamira Paszek	6	6
5	(Japan) Eri Hozumi	1	1

Qualifying competition
1	(Belgium) An-Sophie Mestach	6	6
(Austria) Tamira Paszek	2	1

==== Second qualifier ====
First round
2	(Russia) Elizaveta Kulichkova	6	6
(France) Alizé Lim	3	2
(United States) Sanaz Marand	6	3	6
Alt	(Australia) Arina Rodionova	4	6	3

Qualifying competition
2	(Russia) Elizaveta Kulichkova	6^{9}	6^{6}
(United States) Sanaz Marand	7^{11}	7^{8}

==== Third qualifier ====
First round
3	(Belarus) Aliaksandra Sasnovich	6	6
WC	(United States) Malkia Menguene	1	0
(United Kingdom) Naomi Broady	7	6
8	(France) Stéphanie Foretz	5	2

Qualifying competition
3	(Belarus) Aliaksandra Sasnovich	3	3
(United Kingdom) Naomi Broady	6	6

==== Fourth qualifier ====
First round
4	(Ukraine) Anhelina Kalinina	6	6^{4}	7
(United States) Lauren Embree	1	7^{7}	5
WC	(Russia) Nika Kukharchuk	3	2
6	(Israel) Julia Glushko	6	6

Qualifying competition
4	(Ukraine) Anhelina Kalinina	2	4
6	(Israel) Julia Glushko	6	6
