= 2015 Citi Open – Men's singles =

Men's singles
- 2015 Citi Open

Final
- Champion: (Japan) Kei Nishikori
- Runner-up: (United States) John Isner
- Score: 4–6, 6–4, 6–4

Details
- Draw: 48 (6Q / 4WC)
- Seeds: 16

Events
Singles	men	women
Doubles	men	women
- Washington Open

Milos Raonic was the defending champion, but chose not to participate this year.

Kei Nishikori won the title, defeating John Isner in the final, 4–6, 6–4, 6–4.

== Seeds ==
All seeds receive a bye into the second round.

1. (United Kingdom) Andy Murray (second round)
2. (Japan) Kei Nishikori (champion)
3. (Croatia) Marin Čilić (semifinals)
4. (France) Richard Gasquet (third round)
5. (South Africa) Kevin Anderson (second round)
6. (Bulgaria) Grigor Dimitrov (third round)
7. (Spain) Feliciano López (third round)
8. (United States) John Isner (final)
9. (Serbia) Viktor Troicki (second round)
10. (Croatia) Ivo Karlović (second round)
11. (Australia) Bernard Tomic (second round)
12. (Canada) Vasek Pospisil (third round)
13. (United States) Sam Querrey (third round)
14. (Uruguay) Pablo Cuevas (second round)
15. (United States) Jack Sock (quarterfinals)
16. (Argentina) Leonardo Mayer (third round)

Click on the seed number of a player to go to their draw section.

== Draw ==
Key

- Q = Qualifier
- WC = Wild card
- LL = Lucky loser
- Alt = Alternate
- ITF = ITF entry
- PR = Protected ranking
- SR = Special ranking
- SE = Special exempt
- JE = Junior exempt
- JR = Junior Accelerator Programme entrant
- CO = College Accelerator Programme entrant
- NG = Next Gen Accelerator Program entrant
- w/o = Walkover
- r = Retired
- d = Defaulted

=== Finals ===
Quarterfinals
(Lithuania) Ričardas Berankis	3	7	3
8	(United States) John Isner	6	5	6
15	(United States) Jack Sock	6^{5}	1
(United States) Steve Johnson	7^{7}	6
(Germany) Alexander Zverev	5	6^{3}
3	(Croatia) Marin Čilić	7	7^{7}
(Australia) Sam Groth	4	4
2	(Japan) Kei Nishikori	6	6

Semifinals
8	(United States) John Isner	6	3	7^{11}
(United States) Steve Johnson	3	6	6^{9}
3	(Croatia) Marin Čilić	6	1	4
2	(Japan) Kei Nishikori	3	6	6

Final
8	(United States) John Isner	6	4	4
2	(Japan) Kei Nishikori	4	6	6

=== Top half ===
==== Section 1 ====
First round
(Russia) T Gabashvili	4	6	6
(Germany) B Becker	6	1	3
(Lithuania) R Berankis	7^{7}	6
(Chinese Taipei) Y-h Lu	6^{1}	3
(United States) D Young	6	6
WC	(Germany) T Haas	3	4
(Dominican Republic) V Estrella Burgos	4	6	6
WC	(Chile) N Jarry	6	3	4

Second round
1	(United Kingdom) A Murray	4	6	6^{4}
(Russia) T Gabashvili	6	4	7^{7}
(Lithuania) R Berankis	6	6
14	(Uruguay) P Cuevas	3	3
12	(Canada) V Pospisil	7	6
(United States) D Young	5	3
(Dominican Republic) V Estrella Burgos	3	6^{5}
8	(United States) J Isner	6	7^{7}

Third round
(Russia) T Gabashvili	5	4
(Lithuania) R Berankis	7	6
12	(Canada) V Pospisil	4	6^{6}
8	(United States) J Isner	6	7^{8}

Quarterfinals
(Lithuania) R Berankis	3	7	3
8	(United States) J Isner	6	5	6

==== Section 2 ====
First round
(Tunisia) M Jaziri	3	5
(Luxembourg) G Müller	6	7
Q	(Australia) M Matosevic	3	3
(Belgium) R Bemelmans	6	6
(Slovakia) L Lacko	5	3
(United States) S Johnson	7	6
Q	(Argentina) G Pella	6	6^{7}	7
LL	(Croatia) I Dodig	3	7^{9}	5

Second round
4	(France) R Gasquet	5	6	6
(Luxembourg) G Müller	7	4	4
(Belgium) R Bemelmans	6^{7}	3
15	(United States) J Sock	7^{9}	6
11	(Australia) B Tomic	7^{9}	4	2
(United States) S Johnson	6^{7}	6	6
Q	(Argentina) G Pella	6^{1}	4
6	(Bulgaria) G Dimitrov	7^{7}	6

Third round
4	(France) R Gasquet	7^{7}	6^{5}	4
15	(United States) J Sock	6^{4}	7^{7}	6
(United States) S Johnson	6	1	6
6	(Bulgaria) G Dimitrov	3	6	3

Quarterfinals
15	(United States) J Sock	6^{5}	1
(United States) S Johnson	7^{7}	6

=== Bottom half ===
==== Section 3 ====
First round
Q	(Japan) Y Nishioka	6^{1}	3
(Germany) A Zverev	7^{7}	6
(Ukraine) A Dolgopolov	6	6
(United States) T Smyczek	4	2
Q	(Barbados) D King	2	1
(Japan) G Soeda	6	6
(Israel) D Sela	2	1
(South Korea) H Chung	6	6

Second round
5	(South Africa) K Anderson	6	3	4
(Germany) A Zverev	2	6	6
(Ukraine) A Dolgopolov	6	7^{7}
10	(Croatia) I Karlović	4	6^{2}
13	(United States) S Querrey	6	5	6
(Japan) G Soeda	3	7	4
(South Korea) H Chung	6^{2}	3
3	(Croatia) M Čilić	7^{7}	6

Third round
(Germany) A Zverev	2	6	6
(Ukraine) A Dolgopolov	6	2	4
13	(United States) S Querrey	6^{2}	6^{3}
3	(Croatia) M Čilić	7^{7}	7^{7}

Quarterfinals
(Germany) A Zverev	5	6^{3}
3	(Croatia) M Čilić	7	7^{7}

==== Section 4 ====
First round
Q	(Australia) J-P Smith	3	4
WC	(Australia) L Hewitt	6	6
(Australia) S Groth	7^{10}	4	6
(Brazil) T Bellucci	6^{8}	6	3
WC	(United States) D Kudla	6	4	6^{5}
(Slovenia) B Rola	2	6	7^{7}
(Australia) J Duckworth	6	7^{7}
Q	(United States) R Harrison	1	6^{4}

Second round
7	(Spain) F López	4	7	6
WC	(Australia) L Hewitt	6	5	3
(Australia) S Groth	6	6
9	(Serbia) V Troicki	3	4
16	(Argentina) L Mayer	7^{7}	6^{3}	6
(Slovenia) B Rola	6^{2}	7^{7}	4
(Australia) J Duckworth	7^{10}	1	4
2	(Japan) K Nishikori	6^{8}	6	6

Third round
7	(Spain) F López	3	4
(Australia) S Groth	6	6
16	(Argentina) L Mayer	4	4
2	(Japan) K Nishikori	6	6

Quarterfinals
(Australia) S Groth	4	4
2	(Japan) K Nishikori	6	6

== Qualifying ==
=== Seeds ===
1. (United States) Rajeev Ram (withdrew)
2. (United Kingdom) Kyle Edmund (first round)
3. (Croatia) Ivan Dodig (qualifying competition, lucky loser)
4. (United Kingdom) James Ward (first round)
5. (Argentina) Guido Pella (qualified)
6. (Colombia) Alejandro González (qualifying competition)
7. (United States) Ryan Harrison (qualified)
8. (United States) Austin Krajicek (first round)
9. (Australia) John-Patrick Smith (qualified)
10. (Japan) Yoshihito Nishioka (qualified)
11. (India) Somdev Devvarman (first round)
12. (Japan) Yūichi Sugita (first round)

=== Qualifiers ===
1. (Australia) Marinko Matosevic
2. (United States) Ryan Harrison
3. (Japan) Yoshihito Nishioka
4. (Barbados) Darian King
5. (Argentina) Guido Pella
6. (Australia) John-Patrick Smith

=== Lucky losers ===
1. (Croatia) Ivan Dodig

=== Qualifying draw ===
==== First qualifier ====
First round
Alt	(United States) Sekou Bangoura	3	7^{7}	6^{7}
Alt	(Japan) Takuto Niki	6	6^{4}	7^{9}
(Australia) Marinko Matosevic	6	2	7^{8}
8	(United States) Austin Krajicek	3	6	6^{6}

Qualifying competition
Alt	(Japan) Takuto Niki	2	4
(Australia) Marinko Matosevic	6	6

==== Second qualifier ====
First round
2/Alt	(United Kingdom) Kyle Edmund	4	0
Alt	(Germany) Mischa Zverev	6	6
(Brazil) Guilherme Clezar	3	7^{7}	2
7	(United States) Ryan Harrison	6	6^{2}	6

Qualifying competition
Alt	(Germany) Mischa Zverev	3	6^{3}
7	(United States) Ryan Harrison	6	7^{7}

==== Third qualifier ====
First round
3	(Croatia) Ivan Dodig	6	3	7^{7}
(United Kingdom) Liam Broady	3	6	6^{5}
WC	(United States) Robby Ginepri	6	3	3
10	(Japan) Yoshihito Nishioka	4	6	6

Qualifying competition
3	(Croatia) Ivan Dodig	6^{2}	3
10	(Japan) Yoshihito Nishioka	7^{7}	6

==== Fourth qualifier ====
First round
4	(United Kingdom) James Ward	4	7	4
Alt	(China) Zhang Ze	6	5	6
Alt	(Barbados) Darian King	6	5	6
11	(India) Somdev Devvarman	2	7	2

Qualifying competition
Alt	(China) Zhang Ze	5	3
Alt	(Barbados) Darian King	7	6

==== Fifth qualifier ====
First round
5	(Argentina) Guido Pella	6	6
WC	(Argentina) Jordi Arconada	4	4
WC	(United States) Eric Quigley	6	5	6
12	(Japan) Yūichi Sugita	3	7	4

Qualifying competition
5	(Argentina) Guido Pella	6	6
WC	(United States) Eric Quigley	3	4

==== Sixth qualifier ====
First round
6	(Colombia) Alejandro González	3	6	6
WC	(United States) Ryan Shane	6	3	2
Alt	(Croatia) Matija Pecotić	2	4
9	(Australia) John-Patrick Smith	6	6

Qualifying competition
6	(Colombia) Alejandro González	6^{3}	1
9	(Australia) John-Patrick Smith	7^{7}	6
