= 2015 Aegon Championships – Singles =

Singles
- 2015 Aegon Championships

Final
- Champion: (United Kingdom) Andy Murray
- Runner-up: (South Africa) Kevin Anderson
- Score: 6–3, 6–4

Details
- Draw: 32
- Seeds: 8

Events
Singles	Doubles
- Queen's Club Championships

Grigor Dimitrov was the defending champion, but lost in the second round to Gilles Müller. Andy Murray won the title, defeating Kevin Anderson in the final in straight sets.

== Seeds ==
1. (United Kingdom) Andy Murray (champion)
2. (Switzerland) Stan Wawrinka (second round)
3. (Canada) Milos Raonic (quarterfinals)
4. (Croatia) Marin Čilić (second round)
5. (Spain) Rafael Nadal (first round)
6. (Bulgaria) Grigor Dimitrov (second round)
7. (France) Gilles Simon (semifinals)
8. (Spain) Feliciano López (second round)

== Draw ==
Key

- Q = Qualifier
- WC = Wild card
- LL = Lucky loser
- Alt = Alternate
- ITF = ITF entry
- PR = Protected ranking
- SR = Special ranking
- SE = Special exempt
- JE = Junior exempt
- JR = Junior Accelerator Programme entrant
- CO = College Accelerator Programme entrant
- NG = Next Gen Accelerator Program entrant
- w/o = Walkover
- r = Retired
- d = Defaulted

=== Finals ===
Semifinals
1	(United Kingdom) Andy Murray	6	7^{7}
(Serbia) Viktor Troicki	3	6^{4}
7	(France) Gilles Simon	3	7^{8}	3
(South Africa) Kevin Anderson	6	6^{6}	6

Final
1	(United Kingdom) Andy Murray	6	6
(South Africa) Kevin Anderson	3	4

=== Top half ===
First round
1	(United Kingdom) A Murray	6	7
Q	(Chinese Taipei) Y-h Lu	4	5
(Spain) F Verdasco	3	7	7^{7}
(Spain) R Bautista Agut	6	5	6^{4}
(Luxembourg) G Müller	6^{5}	6	7^{7}
(Russia) M Youzhny	7^{7}	4	6^{5}
(United States) S Querrey	6	3	4
6	(Bulgaria) G Dimitrov	4	6	6
4	(Croatia) M Čilić	7^{7}	3	6
(France) A Mannarino	6^{3}	6	2
(Serbia) V Troicki	7^{7}	1	6
Q	(France) P-H Mathieu	6^{4}	6	4
Q	(United States) J Donaldson	6^{11}	4
(United States) J Isner	7^{13}	6
(Portugal) J Sousa	3	4
8	(Spain) F López	6	6

Second round
1	(United Kingdom) A Murray	7	6
(Spain) F Verdasco	5	4
(Luxembourg) G Müller	6	7^{7}
6	(Bulgaria) G Dimitrov	4	6^{5}
4	(Croatia) M Čilić	7^{10}	2	3
(Serbia) V Troicki	6^{8}	6	6
(United States) J Isner	7^{7}	6^{9}	7^{7}
8	(Spain) F López	6^{5}	7^{11}	6^{4}

Quarterfinals
1	(United Kingdom) A Murray	3	7^{7}	6
(Luxembourg) G Müller	6	6^{2}	4
(Serbia) V Troicki	7^{7}	6
(United States) J Isner	6^{5}	3

Semifinals
1	(United Kingdom) A Murray	6	7^{7}
(Serbia) V Troicki	3	6^{4}

=== Bottom half ===
First round
7	(France) G Simon	6^{6}	7	6
(Belgium) D Goffin	7^{8}	5	2
WC	(Australia) T Kokkinakis	6^{3}	6	6
(France) J Chardy	7^{7}	2	4
(France) R Gasquet	6	6
Q	(Italy) S Bolelli	1	2
WC	(United Kingdom) J Ward	7	3	2
3	(Canada) M Raonic	5	6	6
5	(Spain) R Nadal	3	7^{8}	4
(Ukraine) A Dolgopolov	6	6^{6}	6
(Spain) P Andújar	6^{3}	2
(Spain) G García-López	7^{7}	6
(South Africa) K Anderson	6^{5}	7	6
WC	(Australia) L Hewitt	7^{7}	5	2
(Australia) N Kyrgios	3	4
2	(Switzerland) S Wawrinka	6	6

Second round
7	(France) G Simon	6	6
WC	(Australia) T Kokkinakis	4	2
(France) R Gasquet	4	7^{7}	1
3	(Canada) M Raonic	6	6^{5}	6
(Ukraine) A Dolgopolov	3	6^{4}
(Spain) G García-López	6	7^{7}
(South Africa) K Anderson	7^{7}	7^{13}
2	(Switzerland) S Wawrinka	6^{4}	6^{11}

Quarterfinals
7	(France) G Simon	4	6	7
3	(Canada) M Raonic	6	3	5
(Spain) G García-López	6^{7}	5
(South Africa) K Anderson	7^{9}	7

Semifinals
7	(France) G Simon	3	7^{8}	3
(South Africa) K Anderson	6	6^{6}	6

== Qualifying ==
=== Seeds ===
1. (Italy) Simone Bolelli (qualified)
2. (Chinese Taipei) Lu Yen-hsun (qualified)
3. (United States) Tim Smyczek (first round)
4. (South Korea) Chung Hyeon (first round)
5. (Belgium) Steve Darcis (first round)
6. (Turkey) Marsel İlhan (first round)
7. (Uzbekistan) Denis Istomin (qualifying competition)
8. (Serbia) Dušan Lajović (first round)

=== Qualifiers ===
1. (Italy) Simone Bolelli
2. (Chinese Taipei) Lu Yen-hsun
3. (United States) Jared Donaldson
4. (France) Paul-Henri Mathieu

=== Qualifying draw ===
==== First qualifier ====
First round
1	(Italy) Simone Bolelli	6	7^{7}
(France) Lucas Pouille	3	6^{3}
Alt	(France) Édouard Roger-Vasselin	6	6^{5}	6
8	(Serbia) Dušan Lajović	4	7^{7}	3

Qualifying competition
1	(Italy) Simone Bolelli	7^{7}	6
Alt	(France) Édouard Roger-Vasselin	6^{4}	3

==== Second qualifier ====
First round
2	(Chinese Taipei) Lu Yen-hsun	6	6
(Italy) Luca Vanni	2	3
(Japan) Go Soeda	6^{1}	4
7	(Uzbekistan) Denis Istomin	7^{7}	6

Qualifying competition
2	(Chinese Taipei) Lu Yen-hsun	7^{8}	7^{7}
7	(Uzbekistan) Denis Istomin	6^{6}	6^{5}

==== Third qualifier ====
First round
3	(United States) Tim Smyczek	5	6	3
WC	(United States) Jared Donaldson	7	3	6
Alt	(Germany) Tobias Kamke	6	6
6	(Turkey) Marsel İlhan	3	4

Qualifying competition
WC	(United States) Jared Donaldson	7	6
Alt	(Germany) Tobias Kamke	5	3

==== Fourth qualifier ====
First round
4	(South Korea) Chung Hyeon	1	6	3
WC	(France) Paul-Henri Mathieu	6	3	6
WC	(United Kingdom) Brydan Klein	6	3	7^{9}
5	(Belgium) Steve Darcis	4	6	6^{7}

Qualifying competition
WC	(France) Paul-Henri Mathieu	6	6
WC	(United Kingdom) Brydan Klein	3	2
