= 2015 Aegon Championships =

- Date: 15–21 June
- Edition: 113th
- Category: ATP World Tour 500 series
- Draw: 32S / 16D
- Prize money: €1,574,640
- Surface: Grass
- Location: London, United Kingdom
- Venue: Queen's Club

Champions

Singles
- (United Kingdom) Andy Murray

Doubles
- (France) Pierre-Hugues Herbert / (France) Nicolas Mahut
- Queen's Club Championships

The 2015 Aegon Championships, also known traditionally as the Queen's Club Championships, was a men's tennis tournament played on outdoor grass courts. It was the 113th edition of those championships and was part of the ATP World Tour 500 series of the 2015 ATP World Tour, upgraded from a 250 series event for the first time. It took place at the Queen's Club in London, United Kingdom between 15 June and 21 June 2015.

Despite the elevated status of the event from an ATP 250 to an ATP 500 series event, the draw featured one round less for the first time in its history, meaning reduced numbers of players in the draw. However, there were no byes into the second round for any of the higher-ranked players, as there were previously.

First-seeded Andy Murray won the singles title.

== Finals ==
=== Singles ===
- (United Kingdom) Andy Murray defeated (South Africa) Kevin Anderson, 6–3, 6–4

=== Doubles ===
- (France) Pierre-Hugues Herbert / (France) Nicolas Mahut defeated (Poland) Marcin Matkowski / (Serbia) Nenad Zimonjić, 6–2, 6–2

== Points and prize money ==
=== Point distribution ===
Event	W	F	SF	QF	Round of 16	Round of 32	Q	Q2	Q1
Singles	500	300	180	90	45	0	20	10	0
Doubles	500	300	180	90	45	0	—N/a	—N/a	—N/a

=== Prize money ===
Event	W	F	SF	QF	Round of 16	Round of 32	Q	Q2	Q1
Singles	€381,760	€172,100	€81,530	€39,340	€20,060	€11,035	€0	€1,240	€685
Doubles*	€112,780	€50,880	€23,990	€11,600	€5,950	—N/a	—N/a	—N/a	—N/a

_{*per team}

== Singles main draw entrants ==
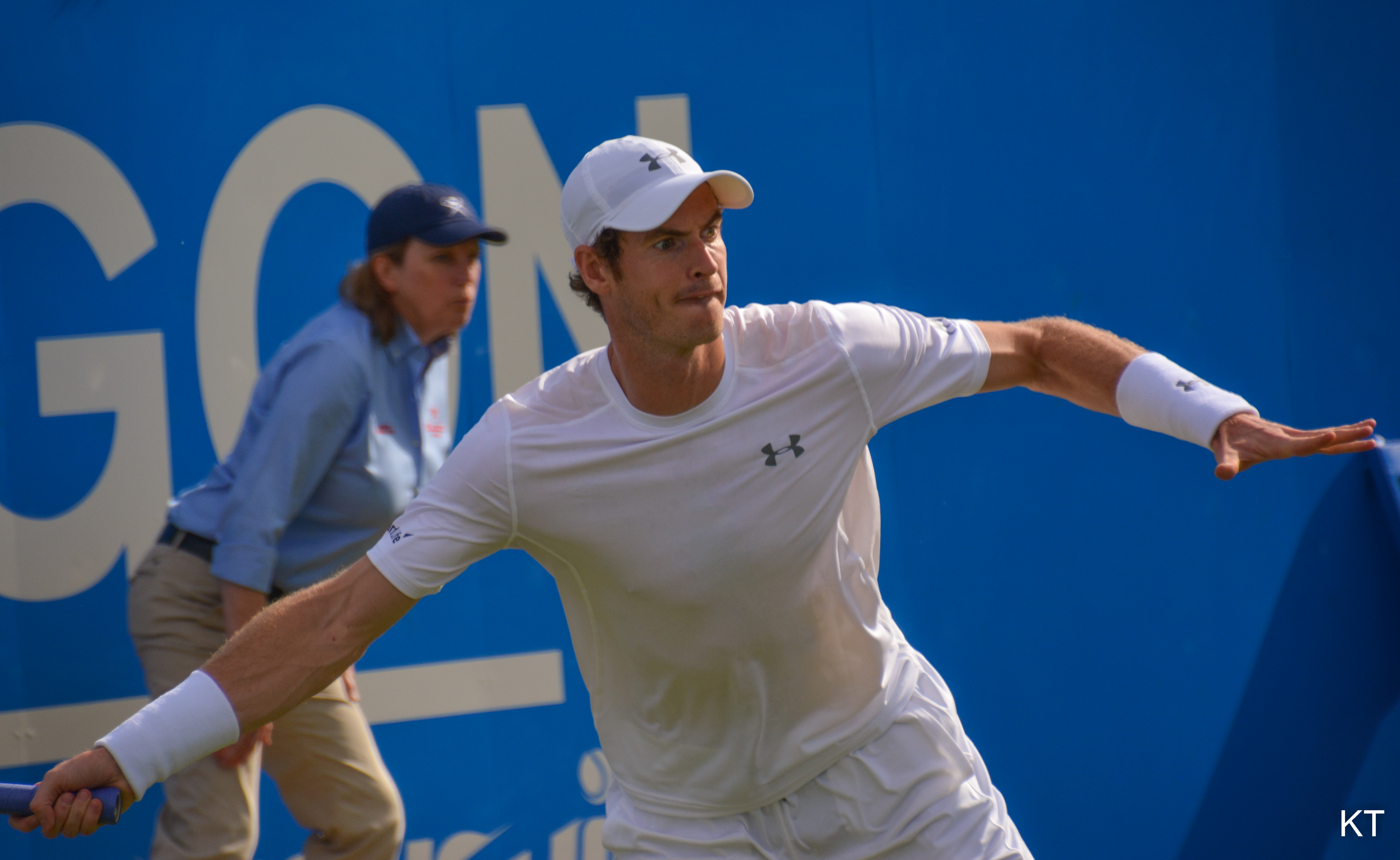
Singles winner Andy Murray at the tournament.

=== Seeds ===
Country	Player	Rank^{1}	Seed
GBR	Andy Murray	3	1
SUI	Stan Wawrinka	4	2
CAN	Milos Raonic	8	3
CRO	Marin Čilić	9	4
ESP	Rafael Nadal	10	5
BUL	Grigor Dimitrov	11	6
FRA	Gilles Simon	13	7
ESP	Feliciano López	14	8

- Rankings are as of June 8, 2015.

=== Other entrants ===
The following players received wildcards into the singles main draw:

- (Australia) Lleyton Hewitt
- (Australia) Thanasi Kokkinakis
- (United Kingdom) James Ward

The following players received entry from the qualifying draw:

- (Italy) Simone Bolelli
- (United States) Jared Donaldson
- (Chinese Taipei) Lu Yen-hsun
- (France) Paul-Henri Mathieu

=== Withdrawals ===
Before the tournament

- (France) Julien Benneteau →replaced by Gilles Müller
- (Argentina) Leonardo Mayer →replaced by João Sousa

== Doubles main draw entrants ==
=== Seeds ===
Country	Player	Country	Player	Rank^{1}	Seed
AUT	Alexander Peya	BRA	Bruno Soares	28	1
POL	Marcin Matkowski	SRB	Nenad Zimonjić	31	2
CAN	Daniel Nestor	IND	Leander Paes	47	3
FRA	Pierre-Hugues Herbert	FRA	Nicolas Mahut	51	4

- Rankings are as of June 8, 2015.

=== Other entrants ===
The following pairs received wildcards into the doubles main draw:

- (Australia) Lleyton Hewitt / (Australia) Thanasi Kokkinakis
- (United Kingdom) Dominic Inglot / (United Kingdom) Andy Murray

The following pair received entry from the qualifying draw:

- (Australia) Chris Guccione / (Brazil) André Sá
