= 2015 Swiss Indoors – Doubles =

Doubles
- 2015 Swiss Indoors

Final
- Champions: (Austria) Alexander Peya (Brazil) Bruno Soares
- Runners-up: (United Kingdom) Jamie Murray (Australia) John Peers
- Score: 7–5, 7–5

Details
- Draw: 16
- Seeds: 4

Events
Singles	Doubles
← 2014 ·	Swiss Indoors	· 2016 →

Vasek Pospisil and Nenad Zimonjić were the defending champions, but Pospisil decided not to participate. Zimonjić plays alongside Marcin Matkowski but lost to Alexander Peya and Bruno Soares in the quarterfinals.

Peya and Soares went on to win the title, defeating Jamie Murray and John Peers in the final 7–5, 7–5

== Seeds ==
1. (Croatia) Ivan Dodig / (Brazil) Marcelo Melo (withdrew)
2. (Netherlands) Jean-Julien Rojer / (Romania) Horia Tecău (semifinals)
3. (United Kingdom) Jamie Murray / (Australia) John Peers (final)
4. (Poland) Marcin Matkowski / (Serbia) Nenad Zimonjić (quarterfinals)

== Draw ==
=== Key ===
- Q = Qualifier
- WC = Wild card
- LL = Lucky loser
- Alt = Alternate
- SE = Special exempt
- PR = Protected ranking
- ITF = ITF entry
- JE = Junior exempt
- w/o = Walkover
- r = Retired
- d = Defaulted
- SR = Special ranking

=== Draw ===
First round
LL	(Netherlands) R Haase (Ukraine) S Stakhovsky	1	4
(United Kingdom) D Inglot (Sweden) R Lindstedt	6	6
WC	(Switzerland) A Bossel (Switzerland) M Chiudinelli	3	4
(Colombia) JS Cabal (Colombia) R Farah	6	6
3	(United Kingdom) J Murray (Australia) J Peers	7^{7}	4	[11]
Q	(Philippines) T Huey (Finland) H Kontinen	6^{1}	6	[9]
(United States) J Isner (United States) J Sock	6	4	[7]
(Canada) D Nestor (France) É Roger-Vasselin	3	6	[10]
(India) R Bopanna (Romania) F Mergea	6	1	[8]
(Austria) A Peya (Brazil) B Soares	4	6	[10]
WC	(Switzerland) H Laaksonen (Switzerland) L Margaroli	4	6^{5}
4	(Poland) M Matkowski (Serbia) N Zimonjić	6	7^{7}
(Spain) M López (Spain) R Nadal	6	4	[10]
(Croatia) B Ćorić (Serbia) V Troicki	1	6	[5]
(Argentina) L Mayer (Italy) A Seppi	6^{4}	6^{2}
2	(Netherlands) J-J Rojer (Romania) H Tecău	7^{7}	7^{7}

Quarterfinals
(United Kingdom) D Inglot (Sweden) R Lindstedt	4	6	[10]
(Colombia) JS Cabal (Colombia) R Farah	6	3	[5]
3	(United Kingdom) J Murray (Australia) J Peers	6	6
(Canada) D Nestor (France) É Roger-Vasselin	3	4
(Austria) A Peya (Brazil) B Soares	6	6
4	(Poland) M Matkowski (Serbia) N Zimonjić	0	1
(Spain) M López (Spain) R Nadal	5	6^{5}
2	(Netherlands) J-J Rojer (Romania) H Tecău	7	7^{7}

Semifinals
(United Kingdom) D Inglot (Sweden) R Lindstedt	5	6	[10]
3	(United Kingdom) J Murray (Australia) J Peers	7	1	[12]
(Austria) A Peya (Brazil) B Soares	6	7^{7}
2	(Netherlands) J-J Rojer (Romania) H Tecău	3	6^{5}

Final
3	(United Kingdom) J Murray (Australia) J Peers	5	5
(Austria) A Peya (Brazil) B Soares	7	7

== Qualifying ==
=== Seeds ===
1. (Philippines) Treat Huey / (Finland) Henri Kontinen (qualified)
2. (Mexico) Santiago González / (Austria) Philipp Oswald (first round)

=== Qualifiers ===
1. (Philippines) Treat Huey / (Finland) Henri Kontinen

=== Lucky losers ===
1. (Netherlands) Robin Haase / (Ukraine) Sergiy Stakhovsky

=== Qualifying draw ===
First round					Qualifying competition
1	(Philippines) Treat Huey (Finland) Henri Kontinen	3	6	[10]
	(Brazil) Marcelo Demoliner (France) Fabrice Martin	6	3	[5]	1	(Philippines) Treat Huey (Finland) Henri Kontinen	6	7
	(Netherlands) Robin Haase (Ukraine) Sergiy Stakhovsky	6	3	[10]		(Netherlands) Robin Haase (Ukraine) Sergiy Stakhovsky	4	5
2	(Mexico) Santiago González (Austria) Philipp Oswald	3	6	[4]
