= 2015 Qatar ExxonMobil Open – Singles =

Singles
- 2015 Qatar ExxonMobil Open

Final
- Champion: (Spain) David Ferrer
- Runner-up: (Czech Republic) Tomáš Berdych
- Score: 6–4, 7–5

Details
- Draw: 32 (4 Q / 3 WC )
- Seeds: 8

Events
Singles	Doubles
- ATP Qatar Open

David Ferrer defeated Tomáš Berdych in the final, 6−4, 7−5 to win the singles tennis title at the 2015 Qatar Open.

Rafael Nadal was the defending champion, but lost in the first round to Michael Berrer.

Novak Djokovic's loss to Ivo Karlovic in the quarterfinals would be his only loss prior to a tournament final in the 2015 season.

== Seeds ==
1. (Serbia) Novak Djokovic (quarterfinals)
2. (Spain) Rafael Nadal (first round)
3. (Czech Republic) Tomáš Berdych (final)
4. (Spain) David Ferrer (champion)

5. (Germany) Philipp Kohlschreiber (first round)
6. (France) Richard Gasquet (quarterfinals)
7. (Croatia) Ivo Karlović (semifinals)
8. (Argentina) Leonardo Mayer (first round)

== Draw ==
=== Finals ===
Semifinals
7	(Croatia) Ivo Karlović	7^{7}	6^{5}	6^{4}
4	(Spain) David Ferrer	6^{2}	7^{7}	7^{7}
3	(Czech Republic) Tomáš Berdych	6	6
(Italy) Andreas Seppi	2	3

Final
4	(Spain) David Ferrer	6	7
3	(Czech Republic) Tomáš Berdych	4	5

=== Top half ===
First round
1	(Serbia) N Djokovic	6	6
(Serbia) D Lajović	2	1
(Ukraine) S Stakhovsky	6	6
WC	(Qatar) JM Ali Mutawa	1	1
(Russia) M Youzhny	5	2
Q	(Georgia (country)) N Basilashvili	7	6
(Czech Republic) L Rosol	6^{4}	3
7	(Croatia) I Karlović	7^{7}	6
4	(Spain) D Ferrer	6^{4}	6	6
Q	(Netherlands) T de Bakker	7^{7}	4	3
(Russia) T Gabashvili	6	3	6^{4}
(Spain) F Verdasco	4	6	7^{7}
(Germany) D Brown	7^{7}	6
(Italy) P Lorenzi	6^{3}	3
(Germany) J-L Struff	7^{7}	4	6
5	(Germany) P Kohlschreiber	6^{3}	6	1

Second round
1	(Serbia) N Djokovic	6	6
(Ukraine) S Stakhovsky	2	1
Q	(Georgia (country)) N Basilashvili	6^{3}	3
7	(Croatia) I Karlović	7^{7}	6
4	(Spain) D Ferrer	6	6
(Spain) F Verdasco	3	2
(Germany) D Brown	7^{11}	6
(Germany) J-L Struff	6^{9}	4

Quarterfinals
1	(Serbia) N Djokovic	7^{7}	6^{6}	4
7	(Croatia) I Karlović	6^{2}	7^{8}	6
4	(Spain) D Ferrer	6	6
(Germany) D Brown	2	2

Semifinals
7	(Croatia) I Karlović	7^{7}	6^{5}	6^{4}
4	(Spain) D Ferrer	6^{2}	7^{7}	7^{7}

=== Bottom half ===
First round
6	(France) R Gasquet	6	7
(Spain) P Andújar	3	5
(Italy) S Bolelli	6	7^{7}
(Germany) B Becker	3	6^{2}
(Argentina) J Mónaco	6^{3}	4
Q	(Slovenia) B Kavčič	7^{7}	6
(Uzbekistan) D Istomin	1	4
3	(Czech Republic) T Berdych	6	6
8	(Argentina) L Mayer	7	6^{4}	6^{4}
(Italy) A Seppi	5	7^{7}	7^{7}
(Brazil) J Souza	3	6	6
WC	(Tunisia) M Jaziri	6	4	3
(Croatia) I Dodig	6	6
WC	(Egypt) M Safwat	3	1
Q	(Germany) M Berrer	1	6	6
2	(Spain) R Nadal	6	3	4

Second round
6	(France) R Gasquet	6	6
(Italy) S Bolelli	3	2
Q	(Slovenia) B Kavčič	1	2
3	(Czech Republic) T Berdych	6	6
(Italy) A Seppi	7	6
(Brazil) J Souza	5	2
(Croatia) I Dodig	7^{7}	6
Q	(Germany) M Berrer	6^{1}	2

Quarterfinals
6	(France) R Gasquet	2	1
3	(Czech Republic) T Berdych	6	6
(Italy) A Seppi	7	6
(Croatia) I Dodig	5	4

Semifinals
3	(Czech Republic) T Berdych	6	6
(Italy) A Seppi	2	3

== Qualifying ==
=== Seeds ===
1. (Serbia) Filip Krajinović (qualifying competition)
2. (Slovenia) Blaž Kavčič (qualified)
3. (United Kingdom) James Ward (first round)
4. (Germany) Andreas Beck (second round)
5. (Uzbekistan) Farrukh Dustov (qualifying competition)
6. (Germany) Michael Berrer (qualified)
7. (Portugal) Gastão Elias (first round)
8. (United States) Rajeev Ram (qualifying competition)

=== Qualifiers ===
1. (Georgia (country)) Nikoloz Basilashvili
2. (Slovenia) Blaž Kavčič
3. (Netherlands) Thiemo de Bakker
4. (Germany) Michael Berrer

=== Qualifying draw ===
==== First qualifier ====
First round
1	(Serbia) Filip Krajinović	6	6
(Italy) Stefano Napolitano	4	2
(Serbia) Ilija Bozoljac	7^{7}	6
(Netherlands) Antal van der Duim	6^{5}	0
(Austria) Philipp Oswald	6	6
WC	(Qatar) Abdullah Shannan Alharrasi	0	1
(Georgia (country)) Nikoloz Basilashvili	6	6
7	(Portugal) Gastão Elias	4	1

Second round
1	(Serbia) Filip Krajinović	6	3	7^{7}
(Serbia) Ilija Bozoljac	4	6	6^{5}
(Austria) Philipp Oswald	3	3
(Georgia (country)) Nikoloz Basilashvili	6	6

Qualifying competition
1	(Serbia) Filip Krajinović	3	3
(Georgia (country)) Nikoloz Basilashvili	6	6

==== Second qualifier ====
First round
2	(Slovenia) Blaž Kavčič	6	6
(United Kingdom) Kyle Edmund	4	4
(Belarus) Yahor Yatsyk	4	4
(Italy) Marco Cecchinato	6	6
(Russia) Aslan Karatsev	4	7^{7}	4
(Belgium) Niels Desein	6	6^{1}	6
(Serbia) Peđa Krstin	1	2
8	(United States) Rajeev Ram	6	6

Second round
2	(Slovenia) Blaž Kavčič	6	6
(Italy) Marco Cecchinato	3	2
(Belgium) Niels Desein	5	6^{3}
8	(United States) Rajeev Ram	7	7^{7}

Qualifying competition
2	(Slovenia) Blaž Kavčič	6	6
8	(United States) Rajeev Ram	3	4

==== Third qualifier ====
First round
3	(United Kingdom) James Ward	6^{4}	1
(Netherlands) Jesse Huta Galung	7^{7}	6
(Morocco) Mohamed Adnaoui	4	0
(Netherlands) Thiemo de Bakker	6	6
WC	(Qatar) Isaa Shanan Al Harrasi	1	1
(New Zealand) Artem Sitak	6	6
WC	(Qatar) Jassem Al Zeyara	0	0
5	(Uzbekistan) Farrukh Dustov	6	6

Second round
(Netherlands) Jesse Huta Galung	2	7^{7}	2
(Netherlands) Thiemo de Bakker	6	6^{5}	6
(New Zealand) Artem Sitak	5	3
5	(Uzbekistan) Farrukh Dustov	7	6

Qualifying competition
(Netherlands) Thiemo de Bakker	7	6
5	(Uzbekistan) Farrukh Dustov	5	4

==== Fourth qualifier ====
First round
4	(Germany) Andreas Beck	6	6
(Russia) Philipp Davydenko	4	3
WC	(Qatar) Ali Al-Saygh	1	0
(Germany) Matthias Bachinger	6	6
(Belgium) Kimmer Coppejans	7^{7}	6
(Belgium) Ruben Bemelmans	6^{4}	4
(Spain) Daniel Muñoz de la Nava	6	4	4
6	(Germany) Michael Berrer	4	6	6

Second round
4	(Germany) Andreas Beck	6^{1}	4
(Germany) Matthias Bachinger	7^{7}	6
(Belgium) Kimmer Coppejans	2	4
6	(Germany) Michael Berrer	6	6

Qualifying competition
(Germany) Matthias Bachinger	7^{7}	0	3
6	(Germany) Michael Berrer	6^{3}	6	6
