= 2015 Aegon Championships – Doubles =

Doubles
- 2015 Aegon Championships

Final
- Champions: (France) Pierre-Hugues Herbert (France) Nicolas Mahut
- Runners-up: (Poland) Marcin Matkowski (Serbia) Nenad Zimonjić
- Score: 6–2, 6–2

Details
- Draw: 16

Events
Singles	Doubles
← 2014 ·	Queen's Club Championships	· 2016 →

Alexander Peya and Bruno Soares were the defending champions, but lost in the semifinals to Pierre-Hugues Herbert and Nicolas Mahut.
Herbert and Mahut went on to win the title, defeating Marcin Matkowski and Nenad Zimonjić in the final, 6–2, 6–2.

== Seeds ==
1. (Austria) Alexander Peya / (Brazil) Bruno Soares (semifinals)
2. (Poland) Marcin Matkowski / (Serbia) Nenad Zimonjić (final)
3. (Canada) Daniel Nestor / (India) Leander Paes (semifinals)
4. (France) Pierre-Hugues Herbert / (France) Nicolas Mahut (champions)

== Draw ==
=== Key ===
- Q = Qualifier
- WC = Wild card
- LL = Lucky loser
- Alt = Alternate
- SE = Special exempt
- PR = Protected ranking
- ITF = ITF entry
- JE = Junior exempt
- w/o = Walkover
- r = Retired
- d = Defaulted
- SR = Special ranking

=== Draw ===
First round
1	(Austria) A Peya (Brazil) B Soares	6	7^{7}
WC	(United Kingdom) D Inglot (United Kingdom) A Murray	4	6^{3}
(Spain) F López (Belarus) M Mirnyi	4	7	[10]
(United Kingdom) J Murray (Australia) J Peers	6	5	[3]
4	(France) P-H Herbert (France) N Mahut	7	6
WC	(Australia) L Hewitt (Australia) T Kokkinakis	5	3
(South Africa) K Anderson (France) J Chardy	7^{7}	7
Q	(Australia) C Guccione (Brazil) A Sá	6^{4}	5
(Spain) M López (Spain) R Nadal	6	6
(Canada) M Raonic (France) É Roger-Vasselin	4	4
(Spain) R Bautista Agut (Serbia) V Troicki	6^{3}	6	[7]
3	(Canada) D Nestor (India) L Paes	7^{7}	3	[10]
(United States) J Isner (United States) S Querrey	6	7^{7}
(Italy) S Bolelli (Belgium) D Goffin	2	6^{3}
(Bulgaria) G Dimitrov (Switzerland) S Wawrinka	6^{5}	6^{3}
2	(Poland) M Matkowski (Serbia) N Zimonjić	7^{7}	7^{7}

Quarterfinals
1	(Austria) A Peya (Brazil) B Soares	6	6
(Spain) F López (Belarus) M Mirnyi	1	3
4	(France) P-H Herbert (France) N Mahut	7^{7}	7^{7}
(South Africa) K Anderson (France) J Chardy	6^{3}	6^{1}
(Spain) M López (Spain) R Nadal	6^{3}	4
3	(Canada) D Nestor (India) L Paes	7^{7}	6
(United States) J Isner (United States) S Querrey	3	6	[7]
2	(Poland) M Matkowski (Serbia) N Zimonjić	6	3	[10]

Semifinals
1	(Austria) A Peya (Brazil) B Soares	3	6^{6}
4	(France) P-H Herbert (France) N Mahut	6	7^{8}
3	(Canada) D Nestor (India) L Paes	3	6^{8}
2	(Poland) M Matkowski (Serbia) N Zimonjić	6	7^{10}

Final
4	(France) P-H Herbert (France) N Mahut	6	6
2	(Poland) M Matkowski (Serbia) N Zimonjić	2	2

== Qualifying ==
=== Seeds ===
1. (Australia) Chris Guccione / (Brazil) André Sá (qualified)
2. (Spain) Pablo Andújar / (Pakistan) Aisam-ul-Haq Qureshi (first round)

=== Qualifiers ===
1. (Australia) Chris Guccione / (Brazil) André Sá

=== Qualifying draw ===
First round
1	(Australia) Chris Guccione (Brazil) André Sá	6	4	[10]
WC	(Israel) Jonathan Erlich (United Kingdom) Colin Fleming	2	6	[3]
(India) Mahesh Bhupathi (Colombia) Juan Sebastián Cabal	7	6
2	(Spain) Pablo Andújar (Pakistan) Aisam-ul-Haq Qureshi	5	3

Qualifying competition
1	(Australia) Chris Guccione (Brazil) André Sá	4	6	[10]
(India) Mahesh Bhupathi (Colombia) Juan Sebastián Cabal	6	3	[5]
