= 2015 Citi Open – Men's doubles =

Tennis tournament

Men's doubles
- 2015 Citi Open

Final
- Champions: (United States) Bob Bryan (United States) Mike Bryan
- Runners-up: (Croatia) Ivan Dodig (Brazil) Marcelo Melo
- Score: 6–4, 6–2

Events
Singles	men	women
Doubles	men	women
← 2014 ·	Washington Open	· 2016 →

The 2015 Citi Open was a tennis tournament played on outdoor hard courts at the William H.G. FitzGerald Tennis Center in Rock Creek Park, Washington, D.C.

Jean-Julien Rojer and Horia Tecău were the defending champions, but chose not to participate in the 2015 Citi Open.

Bob and Mike Bryan won the title, defeating Ivan Dodig and Marcelo Melo in the final, 6–4, 6–2.

== Seeds ==
1. (United States) Bob Bryan / (United States) Mike Bryan (champions)
2. (Croatia) Ivan Dodig / (Brazil) Marcelo Melo (final)
3. (India) Rohan Bopanna / (Romania) Florin Mergea (semifinals)
4. (Poland) Marcin Matkowski / (Serbia) Nenad Zimonjić (semifinals)

== Draw ==
=== Key ===
- Q = Qualifier
- WC = Wild card
- LL = Lucky loser
- Alt = Alternate
- SE = Special exempt
- PR = Protected ranking
- ITF = ITF entry
- JE = Junior exempt
- w/o = Walkover
- r = Retired
- d = Defaulted
- SR = Special ranking

=== Draw ===
First round
1	(United States) B Bryan (United States) M Bryan	6	7
(United Kingdom) J Murray (Australia) J Peers	2	5
LL	(Philippines) T Huey (United States) S Lipsky	6	6
(Austria) A Peya (Brazil) B Soares	4	2
3	(India) R Bopanna (Romania) F Mergea	2	6	[10]
(United Kingdom) A Murray (Canada) D Nestor	6	1	[3]
PR	(Bulgaria) G Dimitrov (United States) M Fish	6^{2}	7^{7}	[10]
(Canada) V Pospisil (United States) J Sock	7^{7}	6^{5}	[8]
Q	(United States) A Krajicek (United States) N Monroe	6^{23}	3
(Colombia) JS Cabal (Colombia) R Farah	7^{25}	6
WC	(Australia) S Groth (Australia) L Hewitt	5	4
4	(Poland) M Matkowski (Serbia) N Zimonjić	7	6
WC	(United States) S Johnson (United States) S Querrey	4	6^{9}
(Spain) F López (Belarus) M Mirnyi	6	7^{11}
(South Africa) R Klaasen (United States) R Ram	6^{1}	2
2	(Croatia) I Dodig (Brazil) M Melo	7^{7}	6

Quarterfinals
1	(United States) B Bryan (United States) M Bryan	6	3	[10]
LL	(Philippines) T Huey (United States) S Lipsky	3	6	[6]
3	(India) R Bopanna (Romania) F Mergea	w/o
PR	(Bulgaria) G Dimitrov (United States) M Fish
(Colombia) JS Cabal (Colombia) R Farah	3	7^{8}	[3]
4	(Poland) M Matkowski (Serbia) N Zimonjić	6	6^{6}	[10]
(Spain) F López (Belarus) M Mirnyi	4	7^{11}	[7]
2	(Croatia) I Dodig (Brazil) M Melo	6	6^{9}	[10]

Semifinals
1	(United States) B Bryan (United States) M Bryan	6	6
3	(India) R Bopanna (Romania) F Mergea	3	4
4	(Poland) M Matkowski (Serbia) N Zimonjić	0	4
2	(Croatia) I Dodig (Brazil) M Melo	6	6

Final
1	(United States) B Bryan (United States) M Bryan	6	6
2	(Croatia) I Dodig (Brazil) M Melo	4	2

== Qualifying ==
=== Seeds ===
1. (Philippines) Treat Huey / (United States) Scott Lipsky (qualifying competition, lucky loser)
2. (United States) Austin Krajicek / (United States) Nicholas Monroe (qualified)

=== Qualifiers ===
1. (United States) Austin Krajicek / (United States) Nicholas Monroe

=== Lucky losers ===
1. (Philippines) Treat Huey / (United States) Scott Lipsky

=== Qualifying draw ===
First round
1	(Philippines) Treat Huey (United States) Scott Lipsky	6	6
(Germany) Benjamin Becker (Argentina) Leonardo Mayer	3	2
WC	(United States) Aaron Capitel (United States) Conor Moran	1	0
2	(United States) Austin Krajicek (United States) Nicholas Monroe	6	6

Qualifying competition
1	(Philippines) Treat Huey (United States) Scott Lipsky	6	3	[8]
2	(United States) Austin Krajicek (United States) Nicholas Monroe	4	6	[10]
