= 2015 Swiss Indoors =

- Date: 26 October – 1 November
- Edition: 46th
- Category: ATP World Tour 500
- Draw: 32S / 16D
- Prize money: €1,575,295
- Surface: Hard
- Location: Basel, Switzerland
- Venue: St. Jakobshalle

Champions

Singles
- (Switzerland) Roger Federer

Doubles
- (Austria) Alexander Peya / (Brazil) Bruno Soares
← 2014 ·	Swiss Indoors	· 2016 →

The 2015 Swiss Indoors was a men's tennis tournament played on indoor hard courts. It was the 46th edition of the tournament, and part of the 500 series of the 2015 ATP World Tour. It was held at the St. Jakobshalle in Basel, Switzerland, from 26 October through 1 November 2015. First-seeded Roger Federer won the singles title.

== Finals ==
=== Singles ===
- (Switzerland) Roger Federer defeated (Spain) Rafael Nadal 6–3, 5–7, 6–3

=== Doubles ===
- (Austria) Alexander Peya / (Brazil) Bruno Soares defeated (United Kingdom) Jamie Murray / (Australia) John Peers 7–5, 7–5

== Points and prize money ==
=== Point distribution ===
Event	W	F	SF	QF	Round of 16	Round of 32	Q	Q2	Q1
Singles	500	300	180	90	45	0	20	10	0
Doubles	500	300	180	90	0	—	—	—	—

=== Prize money ===
Event	W	F	SF	QF	Round of 16	Round of 32	Q2	Q1
Singles	€381,925	€172,200	€81,560	€39,360	€20,065	€11,035	€1,245	€685
Doubles	€112,830	€50,900	€24,000	€11,600	€5,960	—	—	—

== Singles main-draw entrants ==
=== Seeds ===
Country	Player	Rank^{1}	Seed
SUI	Roger Federer	3	1
SUI	Stan Wawrinka	4	2
ESP	Rafael Nadal	7	3
RSA	Kevin Anderson	11	4
FRA	Richard Gasquet	12	5
USA	John Isner	13	6
CRO	Marin Čilić	14	7
BEL	David Goffin	16	8

- Rankings are as of October 19, 2015

=== Other entrants ===
The following players received wildcards into the singles main draw:

- (Switzerland) Marco Chiudinelli
- (Switzerland) Henri Laaksonen

The following players received entry from the qualifying draw:

- (Netherlands) Robin Haase
- (Poland) Jerzy Janowicz
- (Serbia) Dušan Lajović
- (France) Adrian Mannarino

The following player received entry as a lucky loser:

- (United States) Denis Kudla

=== Withdrawals ===
Before the tournament

- (Cyprus) Marcos Baghdatis (groin injury)→replaced by Denis Kudla
- (France) Julien Benneteau →replaced by Borna Ćorić
- (Japan) Kei Nishikori →replaced by Jiří Veselý
- (Canada) Milos Raonic →replaced by Sergiy Stakhovsky
- (France) Gilles Simon →replaced by Donald Young

=== Retirements ===
- (Ukraine) Alexandr Dolgopolov (right elbow injury)

== Doubles main-draw entrants ==
=== Seeds ===
Country	Player	Country	Player	Rank^{1}	Seed
~~CRO~~	~~Ivan Dodig~~	~~BRA~~	~~Marcelo Melo~~	~~9~~	~~1~~
NED	Jean-Julien Rojer	ROU	Horia Tecău	9	2
GBR	Jamie Murray	AUS	John Peers	15	3
POL	Marcin Matkowski	SRB	Nenad Zimonjić	24	4

- Rankings are as of October 19, 2015

=== Other entrants ===
The following pairs received wildcards into the doubles main draw:

- (Switzerland) Adrien Bossel / (Switzerland) Marco Chiudinelli
- (Switzerland) Henri Laaksonen / (Switzerland) Luca Margaroli

The following pair received entry from the qualifying draw:

- (Philippines) Treat Huey / (Finland) Henri Kontinen

The following pair received entry as lucky losers:

- (Netherlands) Robin Haase / (Ukraine) Sergiy Stakhovsky

=== Withdrawals ===
- (Brazil) Marcelo Melo (left leg injury)
