= 2015 Swiss Indoors – Singles =

Singles
- 2015 Swiss Indoors

Final
- Champion: (Switzerland) Roger Federer
- Runner-up: (Spain) Rafael Nadal
- Score: 6–3, 5–7, 6–3

Details
- Draw: 32 (4 Q / 2 WC )
- Seeds: 8

Events
Singles	Doubles
← 2014 ·	Swiss Indoors	· 2016 →

Defending champion Roger Federer defeated Rafael Nadal in the final, 6–3, 5–7, 6–3 to win the singles tennis title at the 2015 Swiss Indoors. This was Federer's tenth consecutive final at the event.

== Seeds ==
1. (Switzerland) Roger Federer (champion)
2. (Switzerland) Stan Wawrinka (first round)
3. (Spain) Rafael Nadal (final)
4. (South Africa) Kevin Anderson (second round)
5. (France) Richard Gasquet (semifinals)
6. (United States) John Isner (second round)
7. (Croatia) Marin Čilić (quarterfinals)
8. (Belgium) David Goffin (quarterfinals)

== Draw ==
=== Key ===
- Q = Qualifier
- WC = Wild card
- LL = Lucky loser
- Alt = Alternate
- SE = Special exempt
- PR = Protected ranking
- ITF = ITF entry
- JE = Junior exempt
- w/o = Walkover
- r = Retired
- d = Defaulted
- SR = Special ranking

=== Finals ===
Semi-finals
1	(Switzerland) Roger Federer	6	6
(United States) Jack Sock	3	4
3	(Spain) Rafael Nadal	6	7^{9}
5	(France) Richard Gasquet	4	6^{7}

Final
1	(Switzerland) Roger Federer	6	5	6
3	(Spain) Rafael Nadal	3	7	3

=== Top half ===
First round
1	(Switzerland) R Federer	6	6
(Kazakhstan) M Kukushkin	1	2
Q	(Poland) J Janowicz	4	6	3
(Germany) P Kohlschreiber	6	3	6
(Serbia) V Troicki	6	5	6^{3}
Q	(France) A Mannarino	4	7	7^{7}
(Italy) A Seppi	6	4	4
8	(Belgium) D Goffin	3	6	6
4	(South Africa) K Anderson	6	6
(Croatia) B Ćorić	3	2
WC	(Switzerland) H Laaksonen	2	6	4
(United States) D Young	6	3	6
LL	(United States) D Kudla	4	2
(United States) J Sock	6	6
(Latvia) E Gulbis	3	4
6	(United States) J Isner	6	6

Second round
1	(Switzerland) R Federer	6	4	6
(Germany) P Kohlschreiber	4	6	4
Q	(France) A Mannarino	4	3
8	(Belgium) D Goffin	6	6
4	(South Africa) K Anderson	2	6^{6}
(United States) D Young	6	7^{8}
(United States) J Sock	7^{7}	6
6	(United States) J Isner	6^{5}	3

Quarter-finals
1	(Switzerland) R Federer	6	3	6
8	(Belgium) D Goffin	3	6	1
(United States) D Young	7	4	2
(United States) J Sock	5	6	6

Semi-finals
1	(Switzerland) R Federer	6	6
(United States) J Sock	3	4

=== Bottom half ===
First round
7	(Croatia) M Čilić	6	7^{7}
WC	(Switzerland) M Chiudinelli	3	6^{3}
(Russia) T Gabashvili	7	4	6
(Argentina) L Mayer	5	6	4
(Ukraine) S Stakhovsky	3	4
(Bulgaria) G Dimitrov	6	6
(Czech Republic) L Rosol	6	5	6^{4}
3	(Spain) R Nadal	1	7	7^{7}
5	(France) R Gasquet	6	6^{2}	6
(Czech Republic) J Veselý	3	7^{7}	4
(Austria) D Thiem	0	7^{7}	7
Q	(Netherlands) R Haase	6	6^{5}	5
(Ukraine) A Dolgopolov	4	0^{r}
Q	(Serbia) D Lajović	6	2
(Croatia) I Karlović	3	7^{7}	6
2	(Switzerland) S Wawrinka	6	6^{2}	4

Second round
7	(Croatia) M Čilić	6	6
(Russia) T Gabashvili	3	1
(Bulgaria) G Dimitrov	4	6	3
3	(Spain) R Nadal	6	4	6
5	(France) R Gasquet	7^{7}	6
(Austria) D Thiem	6^{1}	4
Q	(Serbia) D Lajović	6^{4}	5
(Croatia) I Karlović	7^{7}	7

Quarter-finals
7	(Croatia) M Čilić	6	3	3
3	(Spain) R Nadal	4	6	6
5	(France) R Gasquet	6	6^{2}	7^{8}
(Croatia) I Karlović	4	7^{7}	6^{6}

Semi-finals
3	(Spain) R Nadal	6	7^{9}
5	(France) R Gasquet	4	6^{7}

== Qualifying ==
=== Seeds ===
1. (France) Adrian Mannarino (qualified)
2. (Spain) Albert Ramos Viñolas (first round)
3. (Netherlands) Robin Haase (qualified)
4. (Poland) Jerzy Janowicz (qualified)
5. (United States) Denis Kudla (qualifying competition, lucky loser)
6. (Georgia (country)) Nikoloz Basilashvili (first round)
7. (Germany) Benjamin Becker (qualifying competition)
8. (Serbia) Dušan Lajović (qualified)

=== Qualifiers ===
1. (France) Adrian Mannarino
2. (Serbia) Dušan Lajović
3. (Netherlands) Robin Haase
4. (Poland) Jerzy Janowicz

=== Lucky losers ===
1. (United States) Denis Kudla

=== Qualifying draw ===
==== First qualifier ====
First round
1	(France) Adrian Mannarino	6	6
(Australia) John-Patrick Smith	4	4
(Serbia) Filip Krajinović	2	7^{9}	0^{r}
5	(United States) Denis Kudla	6	6^{7}	1

Qualifying competition
1	(France) Adrian Mannarino	6	2	6
5	(United States) Denis Kudla	2	6	4

==== Second qualifier ====
First round
2	(Spain) Albert Ramos Viñolas	6^{2}	6	3
(Belgium) Ruben Bemelmans	7	1	6
(France) Paul-Henri Mathieu	6^{7}	3
8	(Serbia) Dušan Lajović	7^{9}	6

Qualifying competition
(Belgium) Ruben Bemelmans	7^{7}	6^{5}	4
8	(Serbia) Dušan Lajović	6^{3}	7^{7}	6

==== Third qualifier ====
First round
3	(Netherlands) Robin Haase	6	6
WC	(Switzerland) Adrien Bossel	2	4
WC	(Switzerland) Antoine Bellier	2	1
7	(Germany) Benjamin Becker	6	6

Qualifying competition
3	(Netherlands) Robin Haase	6	7^{7}
7	(Germany) Benjamin Becker	4	6^{4}

==== Fourth qualifier ====
First round
4	(Poland) Jerzy Janowicz	6	6
WC	(Spain) Jaume Munar	1	3
(Russia) Mikhail Youzhny	6	6
6	(Georgia (country)) Nikoloz Basilashvili	4	2

Qualifying competition
4	(Poland) Jerzy Janowicz	6	6
(Russia) Mikhail Youzhny	4	1
