= 2015 Qatar ExxonMobil Open =

- Date: 5–11 January
- Edition: 23rd
- Category: ATP World Tour 250 series
- Draw: 32S / 16D
- Prize money: $1,221,320
- Surface: Hard / outdoor
- Location: Doha, Qatar

Champions

Singles
- (Spain) David Ferrer

Doubles
- (Argentina) Juan Mónaco / (Spain) Rafael Nadal
← 2014 ·	ATP Qatar Open	· 2016 →

The 2015 Qatar Open (also known as 2015 Qatar ExxonMobil Open for sponsorship reasons) was a men's tennis tournament played on outdoor hard courts. It was the 23rd edition of the Qatar Open, and part of the ATP World Tour 250 series of the 2015 ATP World Tour. It took place at the Khalifa International Tennis and Squash Complex in Doha, Qatar from 5 January 5 until 11 January 2015. Fourth-seeded David Ferrer won the singles title.

== Finals ==
=== Singles ===
- (Spain) David Ferrer defeated (Czech Republic) Tomáš Berdych, 6–4, 7–5

=== Doubles ===
- (Argentina) Juan Mónaco / (Spain) Rafael Nadal defeated (Austria) Julian Knowle / (Austria) Philipp Oswald, 6–3, 6–4

== Points and prize money ==
=== Point distribution ===
Event	W	F	SF	QF	Round of 16	Round of 32	Q	Q3	Q2	Q1
Singles	250	150	90	45	20	0	12	6	0	0
Doubles	250	150	90	45	0	—	—	—	—	—

=== Prize money ===
Event	W	F	SF	QF	Round of 16	Round of 32
Singles	$195,000	$102,675	$55,615	$31,690	$18,670	$11,060
Doubles	$62,430	$32,820	$17,790	$10,180	$5,960	
Doubles prize money per team

== Singles main-draw entrants ==
=== Seeds ===
Country	Player	Rank^{1}	Seed
SRB	Novak Djokovic	1	1
ESP	Rafael Nadal	3	2
CZE	Tomáš Berdych	7	3
ESP	David Ferrer	10	4
GER	Philipp Kohlschreiber	24	5
FRA	Richard Gasquet	26	6
CRO	Ivo Karlović	27	7
ARG	Leonardo Mayer	28	8

- ^{1} Rankings as of December 29, 2014

=== Other entrants ===
The following players received wildcards into the singles main draw:

- (Qatar) Jabor Mohammed Ali Mutawa
- (Tunisia) Malek Jaziri
- (Egypt) Mohamed Safwat

The following players received entry from the qualifying draw:

- (Georgia (country)) Nikoloz Basilashvili
- (Germany) Michael Berrer
- (Netherlands) Thiemo de Bakker
- (Slovenia) Blaž Kavčič

=== Withdrawals ===
Before the tournament

- (Spain) Nicolás Almagro → replaced by Ivan Dodig
- (Latvia) Ernests Gulbis → replaced by João Souza
- (Austria) Dominic Thiem (flu) → replaced by Dustin Brown

== ATP doubles main-draw entrants ==
=== Seeds ===
Country	Player	Country	Player	Rank^{1}	Seed
BRA	Bruno Soares	AUT	Alexander Peya	20	1
PAK	Aisam-ul-Haq Qureshi	SRB	Nenad Zimonjić	37	2
COL	Juan Sebastián Cabal	COL	Robert Farah	45	3
CRO	Ivan Dodig	BLR	Max Mirnyi	59	4

- ^{1} Rankings as of December 29, 2014

=== Other entrants ===
The following pairs received wildcards into the doubles main draw:

- (Qatar) Jabor Mohammed Ali Mutawa / (Tunisia) Malek Jaziri
- (Serbia) Novak Djokovic / (Serbia) Filip Krajinović

=== Retirement ===
- (Austria) Alexander Peya (left leg injury)
