= 2015 Roger Federer tennis season =

Statistics for Swiss tennis player

- Full name: Roger Federer
- Country: Switzerland
- Calendar prize money: $8,692,017

Singles
- Season record: 63–11
- Calendar titles: 6
- Year-end ranking: No. 3
- Ranking change from previous year: ▼1

Grand Slam & significant results
- Australian Open: 3R
- French Open: QF
- Wimbledon: F
- US Open: F
- Other tournaments
- Tour Finals: F

Doubles
- Season record: 0–3
- Calendar titles: 0
- Current ranking: Unranked

Davis Cup
- Davis Cup: PO
- Last updated on: 23 November 2015.

Roger Federer's 2015 tennis season began on 4 January 2015 at the 2015 Brisbane International. Federer added a new tactic nicknamed the SABR ("Sneak Attack by Roger") to his strategy. Like the prior season, he reached 11 finals. Highlights from this season include winning his 1000th career match in Brisbane, surpassing 9000 aces in Dubai, winning his first red clay court title in almost 6 years at the Istanbul Open, and two major runner-up finishes at both Wimbledon and the US Open. Despite the success, Federer dropped a rank to No. 3, ending the year with 6 titles.

== Year summary ==
=== Australian Open and early hard court season ===
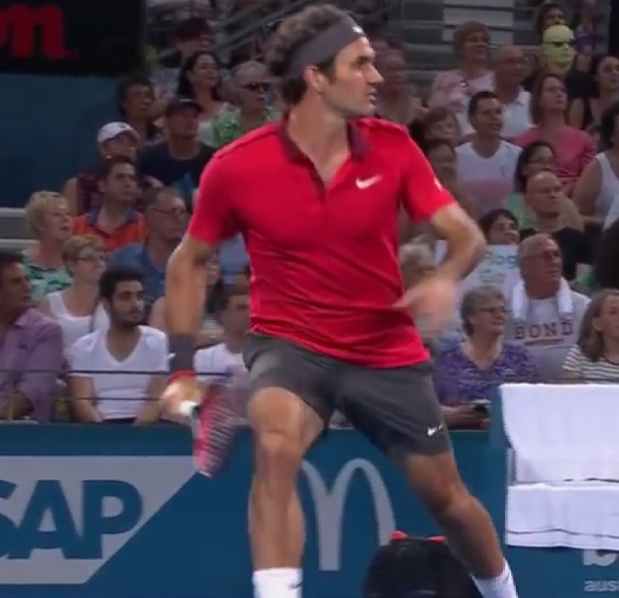
Federer captured his 1000th match victory at the 2015 Brisbane International.

==== Brisbane International ====
Federer opened his season for the second consecutive year in Brisbane after reaching the final in 2014. He defeated John Millman from a set and 1–3 down in his first match. He dropped only one game in a 39-minute victory over James Duckworth, before defeating Grigor Dimitrov in the semifinals in under an hour to set up a final against Milos Raonic. He recorded 1000 match win during the tournament.

==== Australian Open ====
Federer entered the first Grand Slam of the year as the second seed. He opened his campaign for his fifth crown at Melbourne Park with wins against Yen-Hsun Lu and Simone Bolelli but was upset in the third round by Andreas Seppi in four sets, his first ever loss against the Italian. This ended his record of reaching at the least the semi-finals of the Australian Open for eleven consecutive years.

==== Dubai Tennis Championships ====
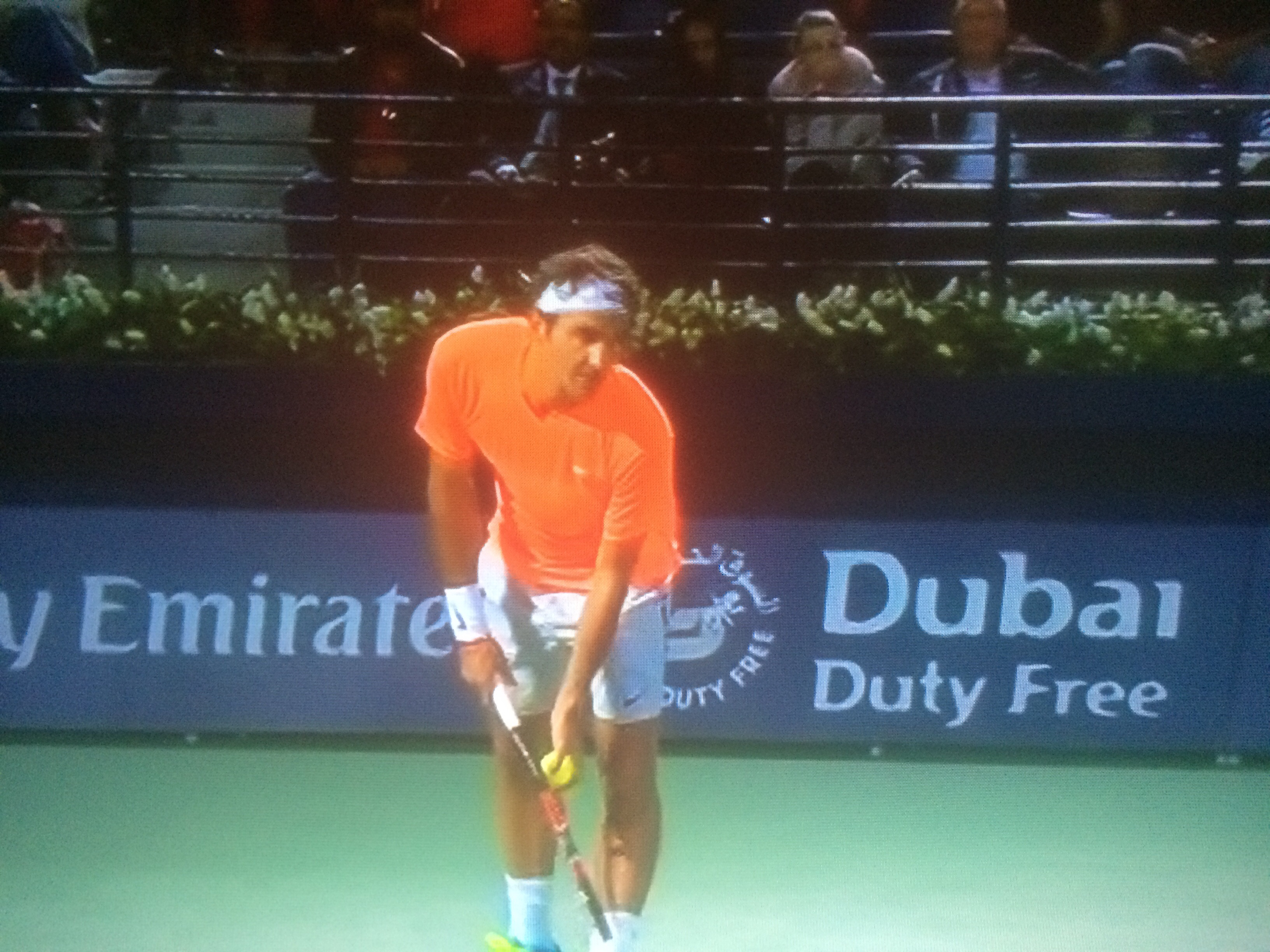
Federer won a record 7th title in Dubai

Federer opened his campaign for the seventh Dubai crown with a straight sets victory over Mikhail Youzhny of Russia and then defeated Spaniard Fernando Verdasco, winning in straight sets after a three-game deficit in the first set. Federer passed through the quarterfinals and semifinals with relative ease, dropping only four games against Richard Gasquet and Borna Ćorić. In the final, Federer defeated world No. 1 Novak Djokovic in two sets. Federer elevated his head-to-head record against Djokovic to 20–17 overall, and 15–13 on hard courts with the straight sets victory. The victory gave Federer a record 7th Dubai crown. He also finished the tournament without dropping a set. During the final match, Federer hit 12 aces and surpassed the 9,000 aces mark in his career total, joining Goran Ivanišević, Ivo Karlović and Andy Roddick as the only players to achieve the mark since aces totals were recorded.

==== Indian Wells Masters ====
As the No. 2 seed, Federer started his quest for a fifth title at the BNP Paribas Open with a victory over Argentinian Diego Schwartzman and avenged his earliest Australian Open defeat against Italian Andreas Seppi by beating him in windy conditions before claiming his 50th milestone win at the event by defeating American Jack Sock in straight sets. He then breezed past Tomáš Berdych in the quarterfinals. He extended his winning streak to 10 matches after battling hard in the semifinals against Milos Raonic and defeated him in straight sets to reach a sixth final in the desert. He lost to Novak Djokovic in the final in three sets.

=== Spring clay court season and French Open ===
==== Monte-Carlo Masters ====
Federer began his clay season at the Monte-Carlo Masters. He opened up against Jérémy Chardy who had beaten him on clay last year in Rome. However this time Federer beat him in straight sets. He then played Gaël Monfils in the third round and lost in straight sets.

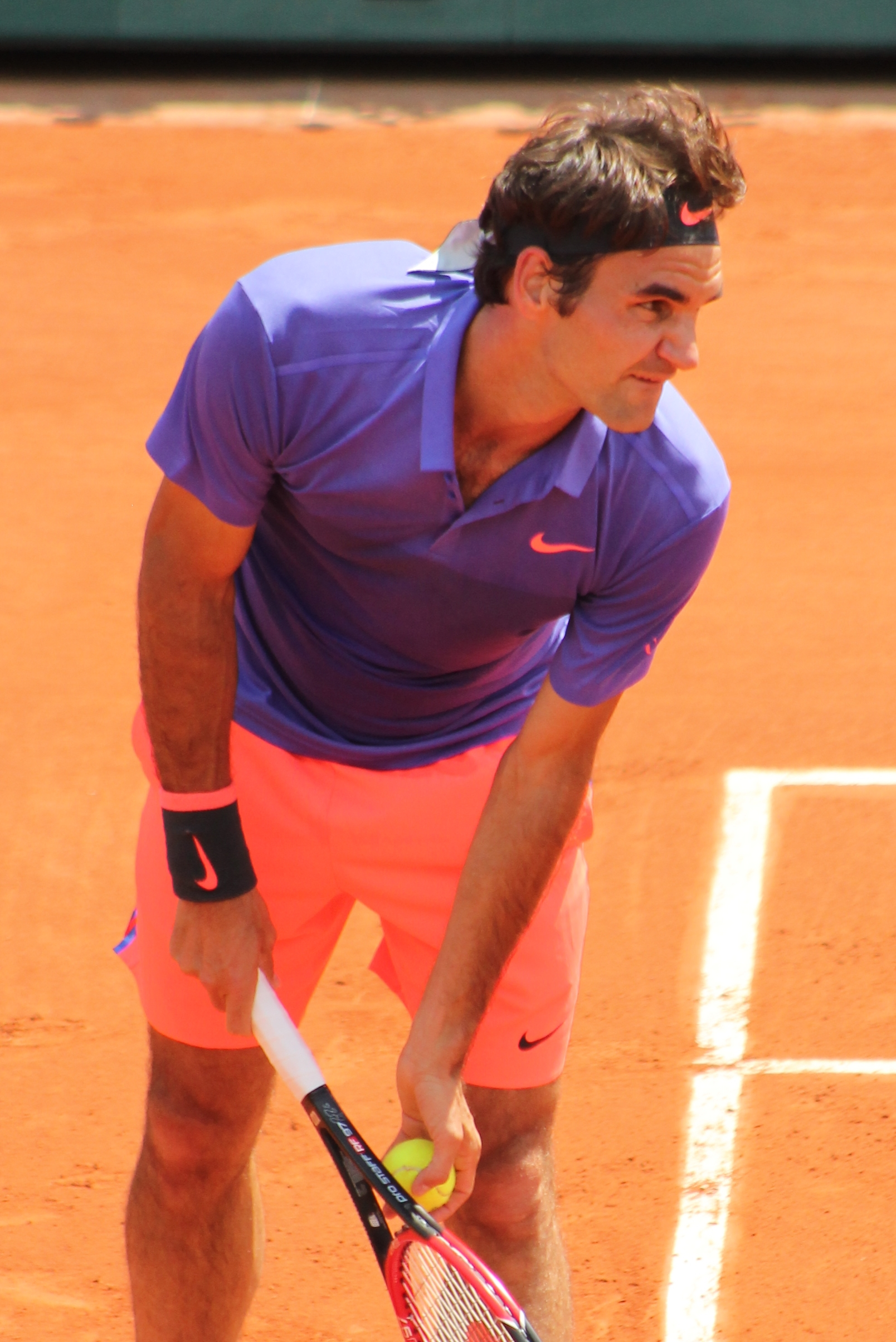
Federer at the 2015 French Open.

==== Istanbul Open ====
Federer next played at the inaugural Istanbul Open. In his opening match he beat Jarkko Nieminen in straight sets, improving his record against Nieminen to 15–0. The win also gave Federer his 200th clay court win. He then defeated Daniel Gimeno-Traver in the quarterfinals in three sets. In the semifinals, he won in three sets again against Diego Schwartzman to advance to the final, continuing his streak of making at least one clay final a season since 2001. He defeated Pablo Cuevas in the final to claim his 85th career title. It was his first title on clay since he won the 2012 Mutua Madrid Open on blue clay and his first on red clay since he won the 2009 French Open.

==== Madrid Open ====
Federer next played at the Mutua Madrid Open as the top seed. He lost his opening match to Nick Kyrgios in three tiebreak sets, despite being up a set and a break and squandering two match points.

==== Italian Open ====
Federer won his second and third round matches against Pablo Cuevas and Kevin Anderson in straight sets. He cruised through Tomáš Berdych in the quarterfinals and Stan Wawrinka in the semifinals, winning both matches in straight sets after being down a break in the first set. He lost to Novak Djokovic in the final in straight sets.

==== French Open ====
Federer entered the French Open as the second seed. He beat lucky loser Alejandro Falla in the first round and Marcel Granollers in the second round, before reaching the round of 16 by defeating Damir Dzumhur in straight sets. He next played against Gaël Monfils but the match was interrupted due to darkness, after they split the first two sets. The match continued the next day, with Federer prevailing in four sets. He advanced to his 44th major quarterfinal and 11th at Roland Garros, where he lost in straight sets to his compatriot and eventual champion Stan Wawrinka in straight sets.

=== Grass court season and Wimbledon ===
==== Halle Open ====
Due to the tournament being upgraded to a 500 event, Federer was not given a first round bye. As the top seed and defending champion, Federer beat Philipp Kohlschreiber in the first round in three tight sets after being down 3–5 in the third set tiebreak. During the match, Federer slipped three times in poor conditions. Federer then beat Ernests Gulbis, Florian Mayer, and Ivo Karlović, all in straight sets, to make his 10th Halle final, where he defeated Andreas Seppi to win a record 8th Halle title. By winning he became the third man in the open era to win a tournament eight times after Guillermo Vilas and Rafael Nadal.

==== Wimbledon ====
Federer entered Wimbledon as the second seed. He beat Damir Dzumhur, Sam Querrey and Sam Groth in the first three rounds, losing just one set (a tiebreaker) against the Australian to reach the second week of the tournament. He easily beat Roberto Bautista-Agut in the fourth round in straight sets to advance to his 13th Wimbledon quarterfinal and 45th overall. In his first match on Court One of the tournament, he beat Gilles Simon in straight sets to advance to his 10th Wimbledon semifinal. He then played a flawless match to defeat Andy Murray in straight sets and advance to his 10th Wimbledon final in a repeat against Novak Djokovic, becoming the first man to reach 10 Grand Slam finals at a single event in the Open Era. However, Federer was unable to sustain his form against Djokovic as he squandered a break in the opening set due to a knee injury and despite a fightback to win the second-set tiebreaker from 3–6 down, he lost the match in 4 sets, committing 35 unforced errors in the process. It marked the first time Federer had lost two back to back finals at Wimbledon, and it again denied him the chance to win a record 18th Grand Slam and a record 8th Wimbledon title to break his shared record of 7 Wimbledon titles with Pete Sampras.

=== North American hard court season and the US Open ===
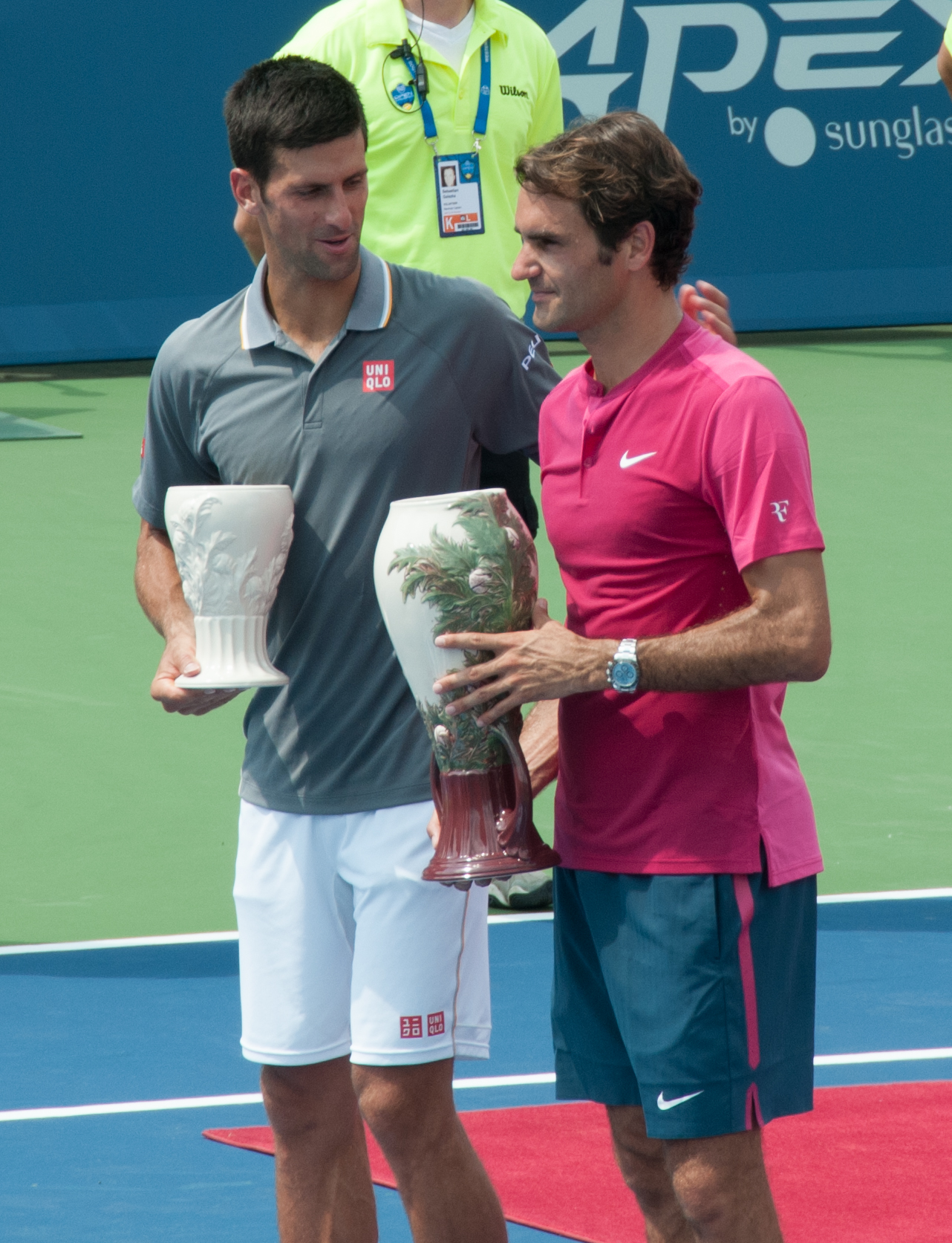
Federer captured his seventh Cincinnati title.

==== Cincinnati Masters ====
Federer began his summer hard court season at the Cincinnati Open as the second seed and defending champion. He defeated Roberto Bautista-Agut in the second round in straight sets before crushing Kevin Anderson in the third round to advance to the quarterfinals. He beat Feliciano López in straight sets to set up a semifinal clash against Andy Murray. In the semifinal he beat Murray in two tight sets to advance to the final. In the final, he met world No. 1, Novak Djokovic and defeated him in straight sets to win a record 7th Cincinnati title and also deny Djokovic from achieving a historic Career Golden Masters. The win saw Federer regain the No. 2 ranking. It also marked the second time that Federer did not lose a set or have his serve broken at a Masters 1000, having achieved this record at the same tournament back in 2012. This was also the first time that Federer had beaten the Top 2 players in the world at the same tournament, although this feat hadn't been possible during the years that Federer was ranked in the top 2 himself.

==== US Open ====
Federer entered the US Open as the second seed. He easily beat Leonardo Mayer and Steve Darcis in the first two rounds. He then beat Philipp Kohlschreiber in straight sets to advance to the fourth round where he defeated John Isner in three close sets that included two tiebreaks and finally breaking Isner's serve for the first time in the since the 2013 US Open. He then dominated Richard Gasquet in the quarterfinals to advance to his 38th Major semifinal. Facing Stan Wawrinka, Federer triumphed in straight sets to advance to his 7th US Open final since 2009, where he played against Novak Djokovic for the sixth time this year for the championship. In their 42nd meeting overall, Federer lost to Djokovic in four sets, who once again leveled their rivalry to an even 21–21 head-to-head.

==== Davis Cup World Group-Play-offs ====
Switzerland played against the Netherlands in the play-offs. After Wawrinka won his match in five sets, Federer won his match against Jesse Huta Galung in straight sets to put Switzerland at a 2–0 lead against the Netherlands. He then played with Marco Chiudinelli in the doubles, but the pair lost to Matwé Middelkoop and Thiemo de Bakker in five sets. The loss did not tire Federer as he went on to beat Thiemo de Bakker in straight sets to put Switzerland back in the World Group.

=== Asian swing ===
==== Shanghai Masters ====
Federer played at the Shanghai Masters as the second seed and defending champion. He lost to qualifier Albert Ramos-Viñolas in the second round in three sets.

=== European indoor season ===
==== Swiss Indoors ====
Federer started his indoors season at the Swiss Indoors. As the defending champion, he easily beat Mikhail Kukushkin. He then defeated Philipp Kohlschreiber and David Goffin in three sets to advance to the semifinals. He then beat Jack Sock in straight sets to advance to his 10th straight Swiss Indoors final. He became the first man in the Open Era to achieve this record. Federer faced his archrival Rafael Nadal in their 34th career head-to-head meeting overall and their 21st finals meeting. Federer won in three sets giving him a record-extending 7th Swiss Indoors championship and his sixth title of the season. This was also his first win over Nadal since the 2012 BNP Paribas Open.

==== Paris Masters ====
Federer's next tournament was the Paris Masters where he was seeded third. He easily beat Andreas Seppi before losing in the third round to American John Isner in three sets without ever losing serve.

==== ATP World Tour Finals ====
Federer began his fourteenth consecutive year-end championships tournament with a straight sets victory over Tomáš Berdych. He then beat the defending champion, Novak Djokovic in straight sets, handing him his first loss at the year-end championships since 2011. The win over Djokovic also snapped the Serb's 38 match winning streak on indoor courts. With the win, Federer advanced to the semifinals for a record-breaking thirteenth time. He then won a tight three-setter against Kei Nishikori despite being up a set and a break to go undefeated in the round robin stage. In the semifinals, he defeated his compatriot Stan Wawrinka in straight sets after being down a break in the first set to advance to a record-breaking tenth final at the year-end championships, setting up a rematch against Djokovic. He lost to Djokovic in straight sets, which saw their head-to-head rivalry an even 22 matches each by the end of 2015.

== All matches ==
Key
W	F	SF	QF	#R	RR	Q#	P#	DNQ	A	Z#	PO	G	S	B	NMS	NTI	P	NH

(W) winner; (F) finalist; (SF) semifinalist; (QF) quarterfinalist; (#R) rounds 4, 3, 2, 1; (RR) round-robin stage; (Q#) qualification round; (P#) preliminary round; (DNQ) did not qualify; (A) absent; (Z#) Davis/Fed Cup Zonal Group (with number indication) or (PO) play-off; (G) gold, (S) silver or (B) bronze Olympic/Paralympic medal; (NMS) not a Masters tournament; (NTI) not a Tier I tournament; (P) postponed; (NH) not held; (SR) strike rate (events won / competed); (W–L) win–loss record.

=== Singles matches ===
Tournament	Match	Round	Opponent (seed or key)	Rank	Result	Score
Brisbane International; Brisbane, Australia; ATP 250; Hard, outdoor 4 – 11 January 2015
Brisbane International; Brisbane, Australia; ATP 250; Hard, outdoor 4 – 11 January 2015	–	1R	Bye			
Brisbane International; Brisbane, Australia; ATP 250; Hard, outdoor 4 – 11 January 2015	1 / 1224	2R	(Australia) John Millman (WC)	153	Win	4–6, 6–4, 6–3
Brisbane International; Brisbane, Australia; ATP 250; Hard, outdoor 4 – 11 January 2015	2 / 1225	QF	(Australia) James Duckworth (WC)	125	Win	6–0, 6–1
Brisbane International; Brisbane, Australia; ATP 250; Hard, outdoor 4 – 11 January 2015	3 / 1226	SF	(Bulgaria) Grigor Dimitrov (4)	11	Win	6–2, 6–2
Brisbane International; Brisbane, Australia; ATP 250; Hard, outdoor 4 – 11 January 2015	4 / 1227	W	(Canada) Milos Raonic (3)	8	Win (1)	6–4, 6–7^{(2–7)}, 6–4
Australian Open; Melbourne, Australia; Grand Slam tournament Hard, outdoor 19 January – 1 February 2015
Australian Open; Melbourne, Australia; Grand Slam tournament Hard, outdoor 19 January – 1 February 2015	5 / 1228	1R	(Taiwan) Yen-hsun Lu	47	Win	6–4, 6–2, 7–5
Australian Open; Melbourne, Australia; Grand Slam tournament Hard, outdoor 19 January – 1 February 2015	6 / 1229	2R	(Italy) Simone Bolelli	48	Win	3–6, 6–3, 6–2, 6–2
Australian Open; Melbourne, Australia; Grand Slam tournament Hard, outdoor 19 January – 1 February 2015	7 / 1230	3R	(Italy) Andreas Seppi	46	Loss	4–6, 6–7^{(5–7)}, 6–4, 6–7^{(5–7)}
Dubai Tennis Championships; Dubai, United Arab Emirates; ATP 500; Hard, outdoor 23 February – 1 March 2015
Dubai Tennis Championships; Dubai, United Arab Emirates; ATP 500; Hard, outdoor 23 February – 1 March 2015	8 / 1231	1R	(Russia) Mikhail Youzhny	55	Win	6–3, 6–1
Dubai Tennis Championships; Dubai, United Arab Emirates; ATP 500; Hard, outdoor 23 February – 1 March 2015	9 / 1232	2R	(Spain) Fernando Verdasco	31	Win	6–4, 6–3
Dubai Tennis Championships; Dubai, United Arab Emirates; ATP 500; Hard, outdoor 23 February – 1 March 2015	10 / 1233	QF	(France) Richard Gasquet	27	Win	6–1, ret.
Dubai Tennis Championships; Dubai, United Arab Emirates; ATP 500; Hard, outdoor 23 February – 1 March 2015	11 / 1234	SF	(Croatia) Borna Ćorić (LL)	84	Win	6–2, 6–1
Dubai Tennis Championships; Dubai, United Arab Emirates; ATP 500; Hard, outdoor 23 February – 1 March 2015	12 / 1235	W	(Serbia) Novak Djokovic (1)	1	Win (2)	6–3, 7–5
Indian Wells Masters; Indian Wells, United States; ATP 1000; Hard, outdoor 9 – 22 March 2015
Indian Wells Masters; Indian Wells, United States; ATP 1000; Hard, outdoor 9 – 22 March 2015	–	1R	Bye			
Indian Wells Masters; Indian Wells, United States; ATP 1000; Hard, outdoor 9 – 22 March 2015	13 / 1236	2R	(Argentina) Diego Schwartzman	63	Win	6–4, 6–2
Indian Wells Masters; Indian Wells, United States; ATP 1000; Hard, outdoor 9 – 22 March 2015	14 / 1237	3R	(Italy) Andreas Seppi (30)	33	Win	6–3, 6–4
Indian Wells Masters; Indian Wells, United States; ATP 1000; Hard, outdoor 9 – 22 March 2015	15 / 1238	4R	(United States) Jack Sock	58	Win	6–3, 6–2
Indian Wells Masters; Indian Wells, United States; ATP 1000; Hard, outdoor 9 – 22 March 2015	16 / 1239	QF	(Czech Republic) Tomáš Berdych (9)	9	Win	6–4, 6–0
Indian Wells Masters; Indian Wells, United States; ATP 1000; Hard, outdoor 9 – 22 March 2015	17 / 1240	SF	(Canada) Milos Raonic (6)	6	Win	7–5, 6–4
Indian Wells Masters; Indian Wells, United States; ATP 1000; Hard, outdoor 9 – 22 March 2015	18 / 1241	F	(Serbia) Novak Djokovic (1)	1	Loss (1)	3–6, 7–6^{(7–5)}, 2–6
Monte-Carlo Masters; Monte-Carlo, Monaco; ATP 1000; Clay, outdoor 13 – 21 April 2015
Monte-Carlo Masters; Monte-Carlo, Monaco; ATP 1000; Clay, outdoor 13 – 21 April 2015	–	1R	Bye			
Monte-Carlo Masters; Monte-Carlo, Monaco; ATP 1000; Clay, outdoor 13 – 21 April 2015	19 / 1242	2R	(France) Jérémy Chardy	35	Win	6–2, 6–1
Monte-Carlo Masters; Monte-Carlo, Monaco; ATP 1000; Clay, outdoor 13 – 21 April 2015	20 / 1243	3R	(France) Gaël Monfils (14)	18	Loss	4–6, 6–7^{(5–7)}
Istanbul Open; Istanbul, Turkey; ATP 250; Clay, outdoor 27 April – 3 May 2015
Istanbul Open; Istanbul, Turkey; ATP 250; Clay, outdoor 27 April – 3 May 2015	–	1R	Bye			
Istanbul Open; Istanbul, Turkey; ATP 250; Clay, outdoor 27 April – 3 May 2015	21 / 1244	2R	(Finland) Jarkko Nieminen	71	Win	6–2, 7–5
Istanbul Open; Istanbul, Turkey; ATP 250; Clay, outdoor 27 April – 3 May 2015	22 / 1245	QF	(Spain) Daniel Gimeno-Traver	62	Win	7–6^{(7–3)}, 6–7^{(5–7)}, 6–3
Istanbul Open; Istanbul, Turkey; ATP 250; Clay, outdoor 27 April – 3 May 2015	23 / 1246	SF	(Argentina) Diego Schwartzman (8)	63	Win	2–6, 6–2, 7–5
Istanbul Open; Istanbul, Turkey; ATP 250; Clay, outdoor 27 April – 3 May 2015	24 / 1247	W	(Uruguay) Pablo Cuevas (3)	23	Win (3)	6–3, 7–6^{(13–11)}
Madrid Open; Madrid, Spain; ATP 1000; Clay, outdoor 3 – 10 May 2015
Madrid Open; Madrid, Spain; ATP 1000; Clay, outdoor 3 – 10 May 2015	–	1R	Bye			
Madrid Open; Madrid, Spain; ATP 1000; Clay, outdoor 3 – 10 May 2015	25 / 1248	2R	(Australia) Nick Kyrgios	35	Loss	7–6^{(7–2)}, 6–7^{(5–7)}, 6–7^{(12–14)}
Italian Open; Rome, Italy; ATP 1000; Clay, outdoor 11 – 17 May 2015
Italian Open; Rome, Italy; ATP 1000; Clay, outdoor 11 – 17 May 2015	–	1R	Bye			
Italian Open; Rome, Italy; ATP 1000; Clay, outdoor 11 – 17 May 2015	26 / 1249	2R	(Uruguay) Pablo Cuevas	24	Win	7–6^{(7–3)}, 6–4
Italian Open; Rome, Italy; ATP 1000; Clay, outdoor 11 – 17 May 2015	27 / 1250	3R	(South Africa) Kevin Anderson (15)	16	Win	6–3, 7–5
Italian Open; Rome, Italy; ATP 1000; Clay, outdoor 11 – 17 May 2015	28 / 1251	QF	(Czech Republic) Tomáš Berdych (6)	5	Win	6–3, 6–3
Italian Open; Rome, Italy; ATP 1000; Clay, outdoor 11 – 17 May 2015	29 / 1252	SF	(Switzerland) Stan Wawrinka (8)	9	Win	6–4, 6–2
Italian Open; Rome, Italy; ATP 1000; Clay, outdoor 11 – 17 May 2015	30 / 1253	F	(Serbia) Novak Djokovic (1)	1	Loss (2)	4–6, 3–6
French Open; Paris, France; Grand Slam tournament Clay, outdoor 25 May – 7 June 2015
French Open; Paris, France; Grand Slam tournament Clay, outdoor 25 May – 7 June 2015	31 / 1254	1R	(Colombia) Alejandro Falla (LL)	109	Win	6–3, 6–3, 6–4
French Open; Paris, France; Grand Slam tournament Clay, outdoor 25 May – 7 June 2015	32 / 1255	2R	(Spain) Marcel Granollers	57	Win	6–2, 7–6^{(7–1)}, 6–3
French Open; Paris, France; Grand Slam tournament Clay, outdoor 25 May – 7 June 2015	33 / 1256	3R	(Bosnia and Herzegovina) Damir Džumhur	88	Win	6–4, 6–3, 6–2
French Open; Paris, France; Grand Slam tournament Clay, outdoor 25 May – 7 June 2015	34 / 1257	4R	(France) Gaël Monfils (13)	14	Win	6–3, 4–6, 6–4, 6–1
French Open; Paris, France; Grand Slam tournament Clay, outdoor 25 May – 7 June 2015	35 / 1258	QF	(Switzerland) Stan Wawrinka (8)	9	Loss	4–6, 3–6, 6–7^{(4–7)}
Halle Open; Halle, Germany; ATP 500; Grass, outdoor 15 – 21 June 2015
Halle Open; Halle, Germany; ATP 500; Grass, outdoor 15 – 21 June 2015	36 / 1259	1R	(Germany) Philipp Kohlschreiber	31	Win	7–6^{(10–8)}, 3–6, 7–6^{(7–5)}
Halle Open; Halle, Germany; ATP 500; Grass, outdoor 15 – 21 June 2015	37 / 1260	2R	(Latvia) Ernests Gulbis	86	Win	6–3, 7–5
Halle Open; Halle, Germany; ATP 500; Grass, outdoor 15 – 21 June 2015	38 / 1261	QF	(Germany) Florian Mayer (PR)	487	Win	6–0, 7–6^{(7–1)}
Halle Open; Halle, Germany; ATP 500; Grass, outdoor 15 – 21 June 2015	39 / 1262	SF	(Croatia) Ivo Karlović (8)	27	Win	7–6^{(7–3)}, 7–6^{(7–4)}
Halle Open; Halle, Germany; ATP 500; Grass, outdoor 15 – 21 June 2015	40 / 1263	W	(Italy) Andreas Seppi	45	Win (4)	7–6^{(7–1)}, 6–4
Wimbledon Championships; London, United Kingdom; Grand Slam tournament Grass, outdoor 29 June – 12 July 2015
Wimbledon Championships; London, United Kingdom; Grand Slam tournament Grass, outdoor 29 June – 12 July 2015	41 / 1264	1R	(Bosnia and Herzegovina) Damir Džumhur	88	Win	6–1, 6–3, 6–3
Wimbledon Championships; London, United Kingdom; Grand Slam tournament Grass, outdoor 29 June – 12 July 2015	42 / 1265	2R	(United States) Sam Querrey	36	Win	6–4, 6–2, 6–2
Wimbledon Championships; London, United Kingdom; Grand Slam tournament Grass, outdoor 29 June – 12 July 2015	43 / 1266	3R	(Australia) Sam Groth	69	Win	6–4, 6–4, 6–7^{(5–7)}, 6–2
Wimbledon Championships; London, United Kingdom; Grand Slam tournament Grass, outdoor 29 June – 12 July 2015	44 / 1267	4R	(Spain) Roberto Bautista Agut (20)	22	Win	6–2, 6–2, 6–3
Wimbledon Championships; London, United Kingdom; Grand Slam tournament Grass, outdoor 29 June – 12 July 2015	45 / 1268	QF	(France) Gilles Simon (12)	13	Win	6–3, 7–5, 6–2
Wimbledon Championships; London, United Kingdom; Grand Slam tournament Grass, outdoor 29 June – 12 July 2015	46 / 1269	SF	(United Kingdom) Andy Murray (3)	3	Win	7–5, 7–5, 6–4
Wimbledon Championships; London, United Kingdom; Grand Slam tournament Grass, outdoor 29 June – 12 July 2015	47 / 1270	F	(Serbia) Novak Djokovic (1)	1	Loss (3)	6–7^{(1–7)}, 7–6^{(12–10)}, 4–6, 3–6
Cincinnati Masters; Cincinnati, United States; ATP 1000; Hard, outdoor 17 – 23 August 2015
Cincinnati Masters; Cincinnati, United States; ATP 1000; Hard, outdoor 17 – 23 August 2015	–	1R	Bye			
Cincinnati Masters; Cincinnati, United States; ATP 1000; Hard, outdoor 17 – 23 August 2015	48 / 1271	2R	(Spain) Roberto Bautista Agut	22	Win	6–4, 6–4
Cincinnati Masters; Cincinnati, United States; ATP 1000; Hard, outdoor 17 – 23 August 2015	49 / 1272	3R	(South Africa) Kevin Anderson (15)	15	Win	6–1, 6–1
Cincinnati Masters; Cincinnati, United States; ATP 1000; Hard, outdoor 17 – 23 August 2015	50 / 1273	QF	(Spain) Feliciano López	23	Win	6–3, 6–4
Cincinnati Masters; Cincinnati, United States; ATP 1000; Hard, outdoor 17 – 23 August 2015	51 / 1274	SF	(United Kingdom) Andy Murray (3)	2	Win	6–3, 7–6^{(8–6)}
Cincinnati Masters; Cincinnati, United States; ATP 1000; Hard, outdoor 17 – 23 August 2015	52 / 1275	W	(Serbia) Novak Djokovic (1)	1	Win (5)	7–6^{(7–1)}, 6–3
US Open; New York City, United States; Grand Slam tournament Hard, outdoor 31 August – 13 September 2015
US Open; New York City, United States; Grand Slam tournament Hard, outdoor 31 August – 13 September 2015	53 / 1276	1R	(Argentina) Leonardo Mayer	34	Win	6–1, 6–2, 6–2
US Open; New York City, United States; Grand Slam tournament Hard, outdoor 31 August – 13 September 2015	54 / 1277	2R	(Belgium) Steve Darcis	66	Win	6–1, 6–2, 6–1
US Open; New York City, United States; Grand Slam tournament Hard, outdoor 31 August – 13 September 2015	55 / 1278	3R	(Germany) Philipp Kohlschreiber (29)	29	Win	6–3, 6–4, 6–4
US Open; New York City, United States; Grand Slam tournament Hard, outdoor 31 August – 13 September 2015	56 / 1279	4R	(United States) John Isner (13)	13	Win	7–6^{(7–0)}, 7–6^{(8–6)}, 7–5
US Open; New York City, United States; Grand Slam tournament Hard, outdoor 31 August – 13 September 2015	57 / 1280	QF	(France) Richard Gasquet (12)	12	Win	6–3, 6–3, 6–1
US Open; New York City, United States; Grand Slam tournament Hard, outdoor 31 August – 13 September 2015	58 / 1281	SF	(Switzerland) Stan Wawrinka (5)	5	Win	6–4, 6–3, 6–1
US Open; New York City, United States; Grand Slam tournament Hard, outdoor 31 August – 13 September 2015	59 / 1282	F	(Serbia) Novak Djokovic (1)	1	Loss (4)	4–6, 7–5, 4–6, 4–6
Davis Cup World Group play-offs Geneva, Switzerland; Davis Cup; Hard, indoor 18 – 20 September 2015
Davis Cup World Group play-offs Geneva, Switzerland; Davis Cup; Hard, indoor 18 – 20 September 2015	60 / 1283	RR	(Netherlands) Jesse Huta Galung	436	Win	6–3, 6–4, 6–3
Davis Cup World Group play-offs Geneva, Switzerland; Davis Cup; Hard, indoor 18 – 20 September 2015	61 / 1284	RR	(Netherlands) Thiemo de Bakker	144	Win	6–3, 6–2, 6–4
Shanghai Masters; Shanghai, China; ATP 1000; Hard, outdoor 12 – 18 October 2015
Shanghai Masters; Shanghai, China; ATP 1000; Hard, outdoor 12 – 18 October 2015	–	1R	Bye			
Shanghai Masters; Shanghai, China; ATP 1000; Hard, outdoor 12 – 18 October 2015	62 / 1285	2R	(Spain) Albert Ramos-Viñolas (Q)	70	Loss	6–7^{(4–7)}, 6–2, 3–6
Swiss Indoors; Basel, Switzerland; ATP 500; Hard, indoor 26 October – 1 November 2015
Swiss Indoors; Basel, Switzerland; ATP 500; Hard, indoor 26 October – 1 November 2015	63 / 1286	1R	(Kazakhstan) Mikhail Kukushkin	64	Win	6–1, 6–2
Swiss Indoors; Basel, Switzerland; ATP 500; Hard, indoor 26 October – 1 November 2015	64 / 1287	2R	(Germany) Philipp Kohlschreiber	32	Win	6–4, 4–6, 6–4
Swiss Indoors; Basel, Switzerland; ATP 500; Hard, indoor 26 October – 1 November 2015	65 / 1288	QF	(Belgium) David Goffin (8)	17	Win	6–3, 3–6, 6–1
Swiss Indoors; Basel, Switzerland; ATP 500; Hard, indoor 26 October – 1 November 2015	66 / 1289	SF	(United States) Jack Sock	29	Win	6–3, 6–4
Swiss Indoors; Basel, Switzerland; ATP 500; Hard, indoor 26 October – 1 November 2015	67 / 1290	W	(Spain) Rafael Nadal (3)	7	Win (6)	6–3, 5–7, 6–3
Paris Masters; Paris, France; ATP 1000; Hard, indoor 2 – 8 November 2015
Paris Masters; Paris, France; ATP 1000; Hard, indoor 2 – 8 November 2015	–	1R	Bye			
Paris Masters; Paris, France; ATP 1000; Hard, indoor 2 – 8 November 2015	68 / 1291	2R	(Italy) Andreas Seppi	28	Win	6–1, 6–1
Paris Masters; Paris, France; ATP 1000; Hard, indoor 2 – 8 November 2015	69 / 1292	3R	(United States) John Isner (13)	13	Loss	6–7^{(3–7)}, 6–3, 6–7^{(5–7)}
ATP World Tour Finals; London, United Kingdom; ATP Finals; Hard, indoor 15 – 22 November 2015
ATP World Tour Finals; London, United Kingdom; ATP Finals; Hard, indoor 15 – 22 November 2015	70 / 1293	RR	(Czech Republic) Tomáš Berdych (6)	6	Win	6–4, 6–2
ATP World Tour Finals; London, United Kingdom; ATP Finals; Hard, indoor 15 – 22 November 2015	71 / 1294	RR	(Serbia) Novak Djokovic (1)	1	Win	7–5, 6–2
ATP World Tour Finals; London, United Kingdom; ATP Finals; Hard, indoor 15 – 22 November 2015	72 / 1295	RR	(Japan) Kei Nishikori (8)	8	Win	7–5, 4–6, 6–4
ATP World Tour Finals; London, United Kingdom; ATP Finals; Hard, indoor 15 – 22 November 2015	73 / 1296	SF	(Switzerland) Stan Wawrinka (4)	4	Win	7–5, 6–3
ATP World Tour Finals; London, United Kingdom; ATP Finals; Hard, indoor 15 – 22 November 2015	74 / 1297	F	(Serbia) Novak Djokovic (1)	1	Loss (5)	3–6, 4–6

=== Doubles matches ===
Tournament	Match	Round	Opponents (seed or key)	Ranks	Result	Score
Dubai Tennis Championships; Dubai, United Arab Emirates; ATP 500; Hard, outdoor 23 – 28 February 2015; Partner: (Switzerland) Michael Lammer
Dubai Tennis Championships; Dubai, United Arab Emirates; ATP 500; Hard, outdoor 23 – 28 February 2015; Partner: (Switzerland) Michael Lammer	1 / 216	1R	(Netherlands) Jean-Julien Rojer / (Romania) Horia Tecău (2)	10 / 10	Loss	4–6, 6–7^{(12–14)}
Indian Wells Masters; Indian Wells, United States; ATP 1000; Hard, outdoor 9 – 22 March 2015; Partner: (Switzerland) Michael Lammer
Indian Wells Masters; Indian Wells, United States; ATP 1000; Hard, outdoor 9 – 22 March 2015; Partner: (Switzerland) Michael Lammer	2 / 217	1R	(Poland) Marcin Matkowski / (Serbia) Nenad Zimonjić	27 / 4	Loss	3–6, 6–3, [9–11]
Davis Cup World Group play-offs Geneva, Switzerland; Davis Cup; Hard, indoor 18 – 20 September 2015; Partner: (Switzerland) Marco Chiudinelli
Davis Cup World Group play-offs Geneva, Switzerland; Davis Cup; Hard, indoor 18 – 20 September 2015; Partner: (Switzerland) Marco Chiudinelli	3 / 218	RR	(Netherlands) Matwé Middelkoop / (Netherlands) Thiemo de Bakker	80 / 398	Loss	6–7^{(7–9)}, 6–4, 6–4, 4–6, 1–6

=== Singles schedule ===
Date	Tournament	Location	Category	Surface	Prev. result	Prev. points	New points	Result
4 January 2015– 11 January 2015	Brisbane International	Brisbane (AUS)	250 Series	Hard	F	150	250	Champion (defeated Milos Raonic, 6–4, 6–7^{(2–7)}, 6–4)
19 January 2015– 1 February 2015	Australian Open	Melbourne (AUS)	Grand Slam	Hard	SF	720	90	Third round (lost to Andreas Seppi, 4–6, 6–7^{(5–7)}, 6–4, 6–7^{(5–7)})
23 February 2015– 1 March 2015	Dubai Tennis Championships	Dubai (UAE)	500 Series	Hard	W	500	500	Champion (defeated Novak Djokovic, 6–3, 7–5)
9 March 2015– 22 March 2015	Indian Wells Masters	Indian Wells (USA)	Masters 1000	Hard	F	600	600	Final (lost to Novak Djokovic, 3–6, 7–6^{(7–5)}, 2–6)
12 April 2015– 19 April 2015	Monte-Carlo Masters	Monte Carlo (MON)	Masters 1000	Clay	F	600	90	Third round (lost to Gaël Monfils, 4–6, 6–7^{(5–7)})
27 April 2015– 3 May 2015	Istanbul Open	Istanbul (TUR)	250 Series	Clay	N/A	N/A	250	Champion (defeated Pablo Cuevas, 6–3, 7–6^{(13–11)})
3 May 2015– 10 May 2015	Madrid Open	Madrid (ESP)	Masters 1000	Clay	A	0	10	Second round (lost to Nick Kyrgios, 7–6^{(7–2)}, 6–7^{(5–7)}, 6–7^{(12–14)})
10 May 2015– 17 May 2015	Italian Open	Rome (ITA)	Masters 1000	Clay	2R	10	600	Final (lost to Novak Djokovic, 4–6, 3–6)
25 May 2015– 7 June 2015	French Open	Paris (FRA)	Grand Slam	Clay	4R	180	360	Quarterfinals (lost to Stan Wawrinka, 4–6, 3–6, 6–7^{(4–7)})
15 June 2015– 21 June 2015	Halle Open	Halle (GER)	500 Series	Grass	W	250	500	Champion (defeated Andreas Seppi, 7–6^{(7–1)}, 6–4)
29 June 2015– 12 July 2015	The Championships, Wimbledon	Wimbledon (GBR)	Grand Slam	Grass	F	1200	1200	Final (lost to Novak Djokovic, 6–7^{(1–7)}, 7–6^{(12–10)}, 4–6, 3–6)
17 August 2015– 23 August 2015	Cincinnati Masters	Cincinnati (USA)	Masters 1000	Hard	W	1000	1000	Champion (defeated Novak Djokovic, 7–6^{(7–1)}, 6–3)
31 August 2015– 13 September 2015	US Open	New York (USA)	Grand Slam	Hard	SF	720	1200	Final (lost to Novak Djokovic, 4–6, 7–5, 4–6, 4–6)
18 September 2015– 20 September 2015	Davis Cup World Group play-offs: Switzerland vs. Netherlands	Geneva (SUI)	Davis Cup	Hard (i)	N/A	N/A	15	Switzerland def. Netherlands, 4–1; Switzerland advanced to 2016 World Group
12 October 2015– 18 October 2015	Shanghai Masters	Shanghai (CHN)	Masters 1000	Hard	W	1000	10	Second round (lost to Albert Ramos-Viñolas, 6–7^{(4–7)}, 6–2, 3–6)
24 October 2015– 1 November 2015	Swiss Indoors	Basel (SUI)	500 Series	Hard (i)	W	500	500	Champion (defeated Rafael Nadal, 6–3, 5–7, 6–3)
2 November 2015– 8 November 2015	Paris Masters	Paris (FRA)	Masters 1000	Hard (i)	QF	180	90	Third round (lost to John Isner, 6–7^{(3–7)}, 6–3, 6–7^{(5–7)})
15 November 2015– 22 November 2015	ATP World Tour Finals	London (GBR)	Tour Finals	Hard (i)	F	1000	1000	Final (lost to Novak Djokovic, 3–6, 4–6)
Total year-end points						9775	8265	▼1510 difference

=== Doubles schedule ===
Date	Championship	Location	Category	Surface	Prev. result	Prev. points	New points	Outcome
23 February 2015– 1 March 2015	Dubai Tennis Championships	Dubai (UAE)	ATP World Tour 500	Hard	DNP	N/A	0	First round (lost to Rojer / Tecău, 4–6, 6–7^{(12–14)})
9 March 2015– 22 March 2015	Indian Wells Masters	Indian Wells (USA)	ATP World Tour Masters 1000	Hard	SF	360	0	First round (lost to Matkowski / Zimonjić, 3–6, 6–3, [9–11])
18 September 2015– 20 September 2015	Davis Cup World Group play-offs: Switzerland vs. Netherlands	Geneva (SUI)	Davis Cup	Hard (i)	N/A	N/A	0	Switzerland def. Netherlands, 4–1; Switzerland advanced to 2016 World Group
Total year-end points						690	0	▼690 difference

== Yearly records ==
=== Head-to-head matchups ===
Roger Federer has a 63–11 match win–loss record in the 2015 season. His record against players who were part of the ATP rankings Top Ten at the time of their meetings was 15–6. Bold indicates player was ranked top 10 at time of meeting. The following list is ordered by number of wins:

- (Czech Republic) **Tomáš Berdych** 3–0
- (Germany) Philipp Kohlschreiber 3–0
- (Italy) Andreas Seppi 3–1
- (Switzerland) **Stan Wawrinka** 3–1
- (Serbia) **Novak Djokovic** 3–5
- (South Africa) Kevin Anderson 2–0
- (Spain) Roberto Bautista Agut 2–0
- (Uruguay) Pablo Cuevas 2–0
- (Bosnia and Herzegovina) Damir Dzumhur 2–0
- (France) Richard Gasquet 2–0
- (United Kingdom) **Andy Murray** 2–0
- (Canada) **Milos Raonic** 2–0
- (Argentina) Diego Schwartzman 2–0
- (United States) Jack Sock 2–0
- (Netherlands) Thiemo de Bakker 1–0
- (Italy) Simone Bolelli 1–0
- (France) Jérémy Chardy 1–0
- (Croatia) Borna Ćorić 1–0
- (Belgium) Steve Darcis 1–0
- (Bulgaria) Grigor Dimitrov 1–0
- (Australia) James Duckworth 1–0
- (Colombia) Alejandro Falla 1–0
- (Netherlands) Jesse Huta Galung 1–0
- (Spain) Daniel Gimeno-Traver 1–0
- (Belgium) David Goffin 1–0
- (Spain) Marcel Granollers 1–0
- (Australia) Sam Groth 1–0
- (Latvia) Ernests Gulbis 1–0
- (Croatia) Ivo Karlović 1–0
- (Kazakhstan) Mikhail Kukushkin 1–0
- (Spain) Feliciano López 1–0
- (Taiwan) Yen-hsun Lu 1–0
- (Germany) Florian Mayer 1–0
- (Argentina) Leonardo Mayer 1–0
- (Australia) John Millman 1–0
- (Spain) **Rafael Nadal** 1–0
- (Finland) Jarkko Nieminen 1–0
- (Japan) **Kei Nishikori** 1–0
- (United States) Sam Querrey 1–0
- (France) Gilles Simon 1–0
- (Spain) Fernando Verdasco 1–0
- (Russia) Mikhail Youzhny 1–0
- (France) Gaël Monfils 1–1
- (United States) John Isner 1–1
- (Australia) Nick Kyrgios 0–1
- (Spain) Albert Ramos-Viñolas 0–1

=== Finals ===
==== Singles: 11 (6 titles, 5 runners-up) ====
Category Grand Slam (0–2) ATP World Tour Finals (0–1) ATP World Tour Masters 1000 (1–2) ATP World Tour 500 (3–0) ATP World Tour 250 (2–0)	Finals by surface Hard (4–3) Clay (1–1) Grass (1–1)	Finals by setting Outdoors (5–4) Indoors (1–1)

Result	No.	Date	Category	Tournament	Surface	Opponent	Score
Winner	83.	11 January 2015	250 Series	Brisbane International, Australia	Hard	(Canada) Milos Raonic	6–4, 6–7^{(2–7)}, 6–4
Winner	84.	28 February 2015	500 Series	Dubai Tennis Championships, UAE (7)	Hard	(Serbia) Novak Djokovic	6–3, 7–5
Runner-up	43.	22 March 2015	Masters 1000	Indian Wells Masters, United States	Hard	(Serbia) Novak Djokovic	3–6, 7–6^{(7–5)}, 2–6
Winner	85.	3 May 2015	250 Series	Istanbul Open, Turkey	Clay	(Uruguay) Pablo Cuevas	6–3, 7–6^{(13–11)}
Runner-up	44.	17 May 2015	Masters 1000	Italian Open, Italy	Clay	(Serbia) Novak Djokovic	4–6, 3–6
Winner	86.	21 June 2015	500 Series	Halle Open, Germany (8)	Grass	(Italy) Andreas Seppi	7–6^{(7–1)}, 6–4
Runner-up	45.	12 July 2015	Grand Slam	Wimbledon Championships, England	Grass	(Serbia) Novak Djokovic	6–7^{(1–7)}, 7–6^{(12–10)}, 4–6, 3–6
Winner	87.	23 August 2015	Masters 1000	Cincinnati Masters, United States (7)	Hard	(Serbia) Novak Djokovic	7–6^{(7–1)}, 6–3
Runner-up	46.	13 September 2015	Grand Slam	US Open, United States	Hard	(Serbia) Novak Djokovic	4–6, 7–5, 4–6, 4–6
Winner	88.	1 November 2015	500 Series	Swiss Indoors, Basel, Switzerland (7)	Hard	(Spain) Rafael Nadal	6–3, 5–7, 6–3
Runner-up	47.	22 November 2015	Tour Finals	ATP World Tour Finals, London, England	Hard (i)	(Serbia) Novak Djokovic	3–6, 4–6

=== Earnings ===
Event	Prize money	Year-to-date
**Brisbane International**	$80,000	$80,000
Australian Open	A$97,500	$160,076
**Dubai Tennis Championships**	$508,935	$669,011
Indian Wells Masters	$444,610	$1,113,621
Monte-Carlo Masters	€40,930	$1,156,995
**Istanbul Open**	€80,000	$1,243,971
Madrid Open	€27,460	$1,274,707
Italian Open	€308,000	$1,619,605
French Open	€250,000	$1,894,780
**Halle Open**	€381,760	$2,324,756
Wimbledon Championships	£940,000	$3,804,034
**Cincinnati Masters**	$731,000	$4,535,034
US Open	$1,600,000	$6,135,034
Shanghai Masters	$31,390	$6,166,424
**Swiss Indoors**	€381,925	$6,587,153
Paris Masters	€42,600	$6,634,017
ATP World Tour Finals	$1,178,000	$7,812,017
Bonus Pool	$880,000	$8,692,017
		$8,692,017

=== Awards ===
- Stefan Edberg Sportsmanship Award
  - Record eleventh award in career (fifth consecutive)
- ATPWorldTour.com Fans' Favourite
  - Record thirteenth consecutive award in career

== See also ==
- 2015 ATP World Tour
- 2015 Andy Murray tennis season
- 2015 Rafael Nadal tennis season
- 2015 Novak Djokovic tennis season
- 2015 Stan Wawrinka tennis season
