= 2015 Stan Wawrinka tennis season =

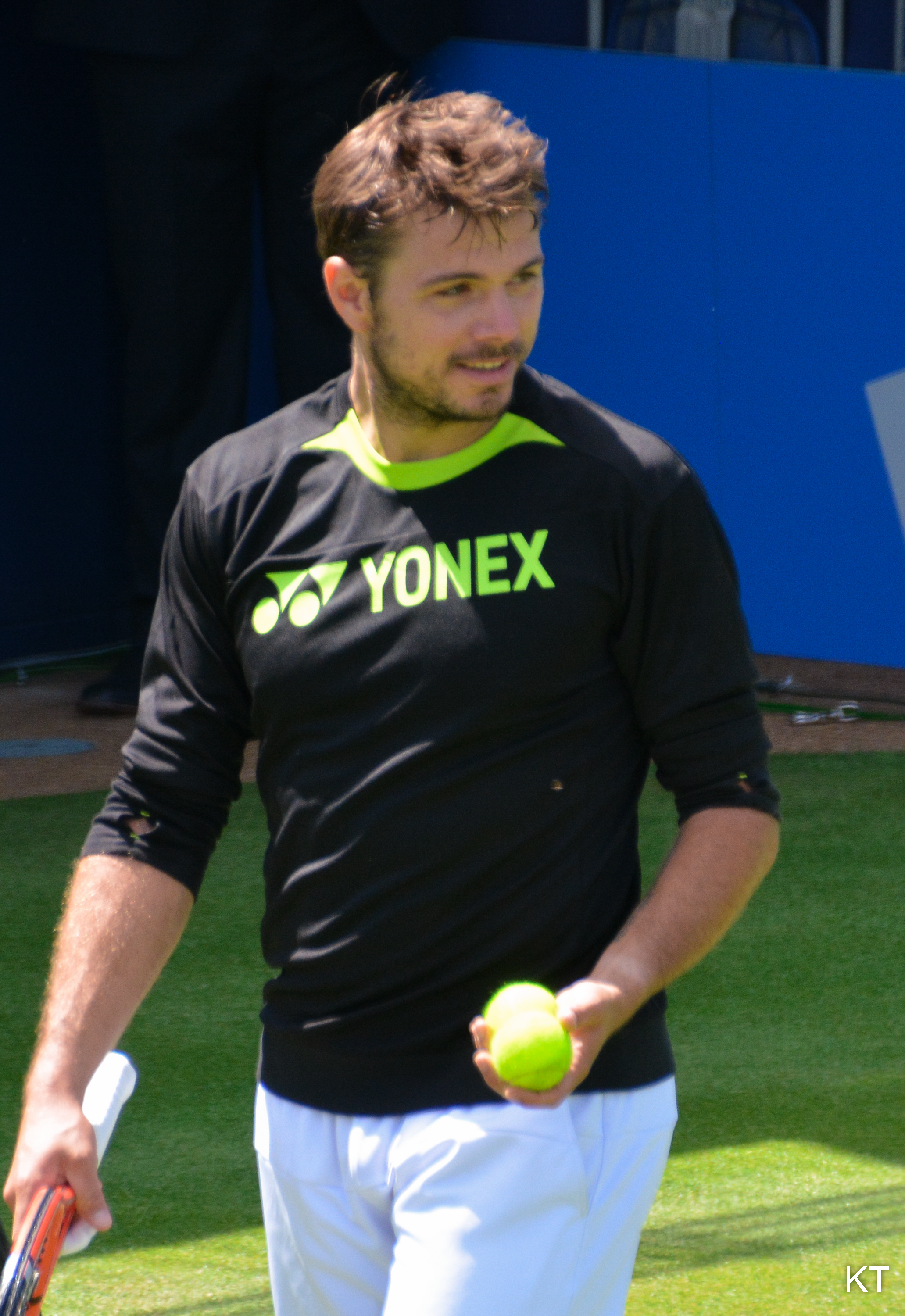
- Stan Wawrinka at 2015 Aegon Championships
- Full name: Stan Wawrinka
- Country: Switzerland
- Calendar prize money: $5,299,265

Singles
- Season record: 55–18
- Calendar titles: 4
- Year-end ranking: No. 4
- Ranking change from previous year: Steady

Grand Slam & significant results
- Australian Open: SF
- French Open: W
- Wimbledon: QF
- US Open: SF
- Other tournaments
- Tour Finals: SF

Doubles
- Season record: 5–5
- Calendar titles: 0
- Current ranking: 109
- Ranking change from previous year: ▼14
- Last updated on: 22 November 2015.

The 2015 Stan Wawrinka tennis season began at the Chennai Open, where he won the title for the third time in his career. This was followed by an unsuccessful defense of his title at the Australian Open, where he lost in the semi-finals to eventual champion Novak Djokovic in five sets. A few months later, after a relatively unsuccessful clay season, Stan won his second major title at the French Open, defeating Roger Federer and Novak Djokovic in the process.

== Year summary ==
=== Australian Open and early hard court season ===
==== Chennai Open ====
Wawrinka opened his season for the seventh consecutive year in Chennai, where he was the defending champion. After a bye in the first round he easily beat Borna Ćorić, Gilles Müller and David Goffin in the semifinal before defeating Aljaž Bedene in the final to have his first singles title defense of his career.

==== Australian Open ====
Wawrinka entered the first Grand Slam of the year as the fourth seed and was the defending champion. He opened his campaign with ease, recording straight sets wins against Marsel İlhan, Marius Copil and Jarkko Nieminen. In the fourth round Wawrinka lost the first set against the Spanish Guillermo García López but won the match in the fourth set in a tiebreak. The Swiss then avenged his US Open loss Kei Nishikori, defeating him in the quarter-finals in straight sets. At the semi-final, his title defense came to an end after being beaten by eventual champion Novak Djokovic in five sets.

==== Rotterdam ====
Wawrinka played his first ATP World Tour 500 level and indoor tournament of the year in Rotterdam, first beating Jesse Huta Galung after being a set down. He then beat Garcia-Lopez in three sets, then beat Gilles Müller in straights. In the semifinals, he beat Milos Raonic in two tiebreaks, making his second Top 10 win of the season. At the final, he beat Tomáš Berdych from a set down, winning his first 500 level, and first indoor title of his career.

==== Marseille ====
Wawrinka continued his indoor play in Marseille, where he first beat wildcard Benoît Paire in straight sets. His run of wins came to an end however, losing to Sergiy Stakhovsky after being a set up.

==== Indian Wells Masters ====
Wawrinka played at Indian Wells Masters as the seventh seed. After a first round bye, he lost to Robin Haase in three sets in the second round. This was the first loss in his career against the Dutch after six wins of the Swiss.

==== Miami Open ====
Wawrinka defeated in the second round Carlos Berlocq in a three set match, but he was beat by Adrian Mannarino in the next round in three sets.

=== Spring clay court season and French Open ===
==== Monte-Carlo Masters ====
Wawrinka began his clay season in Monte-Carlo where he was the defending champion. He faced Juan Mónaco as his first opponent and defeated him in straight sets. However, he lost against Grigor Dimitrov in the next round, receiving his worst loss of his career, winning only a total of 3 games. After his loss, he publicly announced on Facebook about his separation with his wife, Ilham.

==== Madrid ====
Wawrinka first defeated João Sousa in straight sets, but was defeated again by Dimitrov in the next round, this time losing in three sets.

==== Rome ====
After a slump that started since Indian Wells, Wawrinka started to show some form again after beating Monaco in his first match after being down a set and a break, and having break points against him for a double break. He then reached another ATP World Tour Masters 1000 quarterfinal after beating Dominic Thiem in straights, his first since Cincinnati the year before. At the quarterfinal, he defeated Rafael Nadal for the first time on clay, beating him in straight sets for the first time in his career, after being down multiple set points in the first-set tiebreaker. He then faced fellow Swiss Roger Federer in the semifinal, where he was defeated in straights after being a break up in the first set.

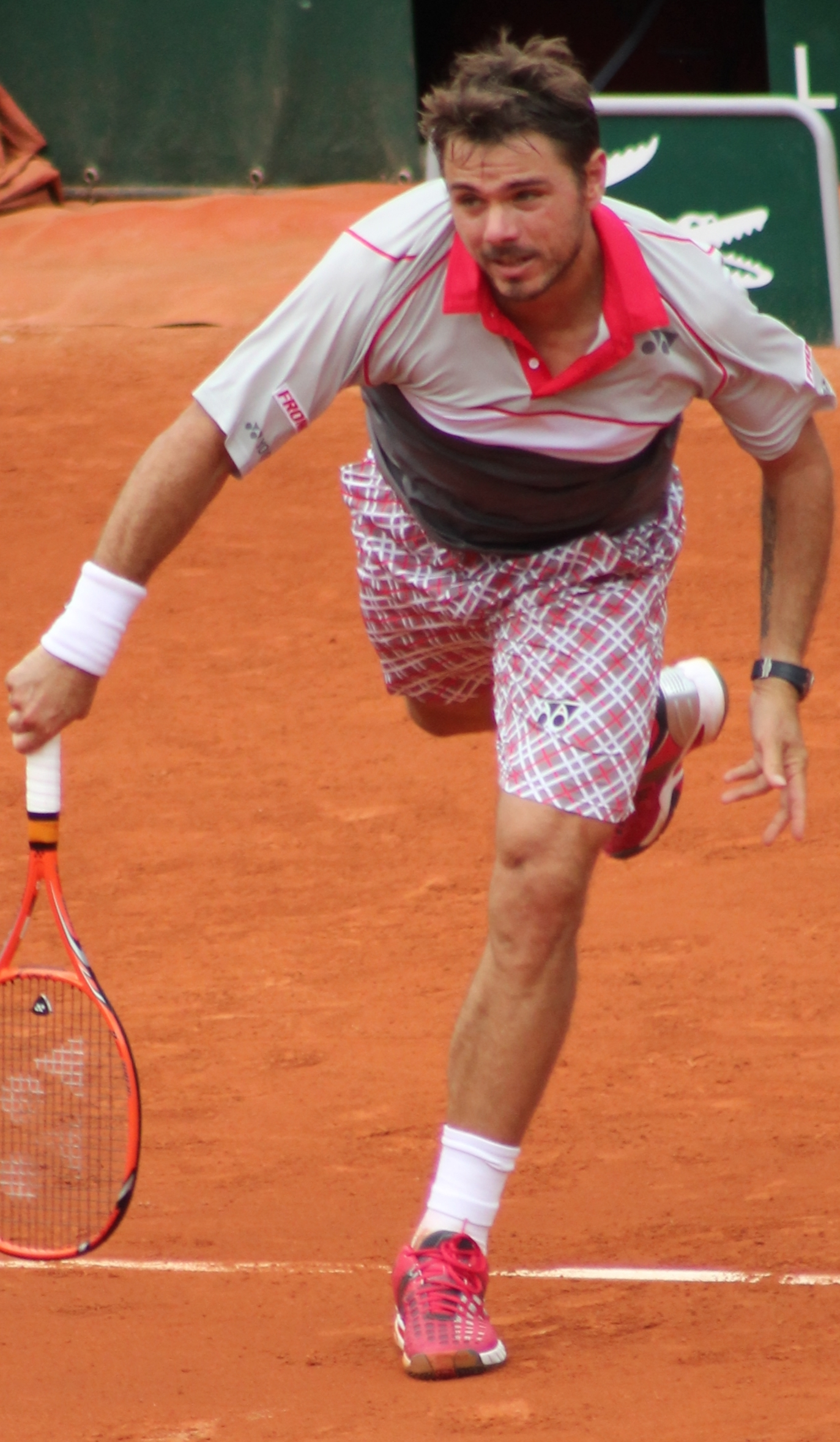
Wawrinka at the 2015 French Open.

==== Geneva ====
Wawrinka continued his preparation for the French Open by playing in the inaugural Geneva Open, where he beat qualifier Lukáš Rosol in three sets. He then lost in the quarterfinals against Federico Delbonis after being a set up.

==== French Open ====
Wawrinka started his 2015 French Open campaign, first beating İlhan. He then followed it up by beating Dušan Lajović, only dropping the third set. He then beat Steve Johnson, then beat Gilles Simon, both in straight sets. At the quarterfinal, he again faced Federer in a rematch of Rome this year, where Wawrinka turned the tables against his fellow Swiss, incurring Wawrinka's first win against Federer in a Grand Slam. This win meant that Wawrinka had finally beaten each of the Big Four in a major at least one time, and it also has brought Federer's first defeat in a major without breaking his opponent's serve, and also brings Wawrinka's first French Open semifinal. At the semifinal, he faced Jo-Wilfried Tsonga, where after winning a comfortable first set, he dropped the second after being a break up. At the third set, Wawrinka prevailed in the tiebreak after being down multiple break points in the set. He then won the match winning the fourth set, beating the Frenchman and advancing to his first French Open final, his second major final overall. At the final, he faced Djokovic, where he lost the first set. However, he was able to come back in the second set after being break points down in the first game. He was also able to win the third set comfortably. At the fourth set however, he lost the first three games. Wawrinka eventually was able to come back in the set, and had break points on the seventh game. Djokovic managed to save them all however, and had Wawrinka at 0–40 in the eight game, but managed to save them all. He finally broke Djokovic in the ninth game, and won the match after serving it out in the game after. With this win, he won his first French Open title, improved his major final record to 2–0, and won his second major title of his career.

=== Grass court season and Wimbledon ===
==== Queen's Club ====
Wawrinka started his grass court season campaign by playing the 2015 Aegon Championships on Queen's Club in London, where he first beat last year's Wimbledon quarterfinalist Nick Kyrgios in straights. However, he was then beaten by eventual finalist Kevin Anderson in two tight tiebreak sets, making it his fourth consecutive loss against the South African.

==== Wimbledon ====
Wawrinka continued his major win streak by defeating Sousa, Víctor Estrella Burgos, Fernando Verdasco and David Goffin in the first four rounds, all in straight sets. At the quarterfinal, however, he was beaten by Richard Gasquet after having a 2-1 set lead.

=== US Open series ===
==== Montreal ====
He started his US Open preparation by playing in the 2015 Rogers Cup. He lost to Kyrgios after being a set up, where Wawrinka retired at the third set. During the match, Kyrgios made offending comments against Wawrinka, where after knowing about it after match, Wawrinka demanded Kyrgios an apology to those all concerned in the incident.

==== Cincinnati ====
Wawrinka played at the 2015 Western & Southern Open in Cincinnati, where he first faced Borna Ćorić, defeating him from a set down. He then faced another Croatian in Ivo Karlović, where he won in three tiebreak sets. In a rematch of the French Open final, he faced Djokovic again, but this time in a Masters quarterfinal, where Djokovic prevailed losing only 5 games.

==== US Open ====
At the third major of the year, Wawrinka started his 2015 US Open campaign by first beating Albert Ramos in straight sets. He then faced young South Korean player Chung Hyeon, where he needed three tiebreak sets to win it. He then defeated Ruben Bemelmans, in straight sets again, but then dropped his first set of the tournament, against Donald Young. He eventually prevailed in four sets, where he next faced Anderson, and finally snapeds the four match losing streak against the South African, winning in straight sets and the third set without losing a game. At the semifinal, he faced Federer again, where he lost in straights.

=== Davis Cup play-offs, Asian swing, and the indoor season ===
==== Davis Cup World Group play-offs ====
Wawrinka represented Switzerland in the 2015 Davis Cup World Group play-offs, facing against Dutchman Thiemo de Bakker in the first singles rubber. After being 1-2 sets down, Warwinka was able to come back and win the next two sets to win the match. Switzerland eventually won the tie at the fourth rubber.

==== Metz ====
Wawrinka started the indoor season at the 2015 Moselle Open, where he defeated Dustin Brown in three sets. However, Wawrinka gave a walkover on the quarterfinal against Philipp Kohlschreiber.

==== Tokyo ====
Wawrinka started the Asian swing by playing at the 2015 Rakuten Japan Open Tennis Championships in Tokyo, where he first beat Radek Štěpánek in straights, his first straight sets win in a three-setter since his win against Kyrgios in Queen's Club. He then avenged his loss against Tatsuma Ito the year before, by beating him this time in three sets. Wawrinka then faced qualifier Austin Krajicek in the quarterfinals, defeating him in straight sets. At the semifinal, he faced Muller again, again winning in straight sets, with a second-set tiebreaker. He faced his close friend Paire again, but this time in a final for the first time. Wawrinka won the match for the championship, winning it in straight sets, giving Wawrinka his first Tokyo title, and his second 500 level tournament title of the year and his career.

==== Shanghai ====
Wawrinka continued the Asian swing by participating in the 2015 Shanghai Rolex Masters, where he first beat Viktor Troicki in straights. He then faced Marin Čilić, winning in a tight three setter. His run came to an end when he faced Nadal again at a Masters quarterfinal, this time Wawrinka only winning three games during the match.

==== Basel ====
After the Asian swing, Wawrinka continued his indoor season in the 2015 Swiss Indoors in Basel. He lost against Karlović this time in three sets however, after he won the first set.

==== Paris ====
Wawrinka played at the 2015 BNP Paribas Masters in Paris, the final ATP World Tour Masters 1000 tournament of the year. He first defeated Bernard Tomic in straight sets, then beat Troicki again in straight sets. He again faced Nadal in the quarterfinal, but this time he won in two very tight tiebreak sets. Wawrinka then faced Djokovic, where after being a set a break down, was able to win the second set, giving Djokovic his first set loss since the US Open final. However, Wawrinka wasn't able to carry this momentum, as he didn't win any games in the third set, ending his run this year in the Masters.

==== ATP World Tour Finals ====
Wawrinka qualified for the third straight time in the ATP World Tour Finals, and is the fourth seed at the event. He was put in the Ilie Năstase Group. At the first rubber, he lost against Nadal in straights only winning five games. At the second rubber, he won against Ferrer in straights. At the third rubber, he faced Andy Murray for the first time since their last meeting at the 2013 US Open quarterfinals, where the winner of this rubber would be guaranteed a place in the semifinal after placing second in the group, facing Federer. Wawrinka won the match in straight sets, advancing him to his third straight semifinal at the year-end championships. He rematched Federer in the semifinal, this time losing in straight sets.

== All matches ==
This table chronicles all the matches of Stanislas Wawrinka in 2015, including walkovers (W/O) which the ATP does not count as wins. They are marked ND for non-decision or no decision.

Key
W	F	SF	QF	#R	RR	Q#	P#	DNQ	A	Z#	PO	G	S	B	NMS	NTI	P	NH

(W) winner; (F) finalist; (SF) semifinalist; (QF) quarterfinalist; (#R) rounds 4, 3, 2, 1; (RR) round-robin stage; (Q#) qualification round; (P#) preliminary round; (DNQ) did not qualify; (A) absent; (Z#) Davis/Fed Cup Zonal Group (with number indication) or (PO) play-off; (G) gold, (S) silver or (B) bronze Olympic/Paralympic medal; (NMS) not a Masters tournament; (NTI) not a Tier I tournament; (P) postponed; (NH) not held; (SR) strike rate (events won / competed); (W–L) win–loss record.
To avoid confusion and double counting, these charts are updated at the conclusion of a tournament or when the player's participation has ended.

=== Singles matches ===
Tournament	Match	Round	Opponent (seed or key)	Rank	Result	Score
Chennai Open; Chennai, India; ATP 250; Hard, outdoor 5–11 January 2015
Chennai Open; Chennai, India; ATP 250; Hard, outdoor 5–11 January 2015	–	1R	Bye			
Chennai Open; Chennai, India; ATP 250; Hard, outdoor 5–11 January 2015	1 / 554	2R	(Croatia) Borna Ćorić	95	Win	6–1, 6–4
Chennai Open; Chennai, India; ATP 250; Hard, outdoor 5–11 January 2015	2 / 555	QF	(Luxembourg) Gilles Müller (8)	46	Win	6–2, 7–6^{(7–4)}
Chennai Open; Chennai, India; ATP 250; Hard, outdoor 5–11 January 2015	3 / 556	SF	(Belgium) David Goffin (4)	22	Win	7–5, 6–3
Chennai Open; Chennai, India; ATP 250; Hard, outdoor 5–11 January 2015	4 / 557	W	(Slovenia) Aljaž Bedene (Q)	156	Win (1)	6–3, 6–4
Australian Open; Melbourne, Australia; Grand Slam tournament Hard, outdoor 19 January – 1 February 2015
Australian Open; Melbourne, Australia; Grand Slam tournament Hard, outdoor 19 January – 1 February 2015	5 / 558	1R	(Turkey) Marsel İlhan (Q)	100	Win	6–1, 6–4, 6–2
Australian Open; Melbourne, Australia; Grand Slam tournament Hard, outdoor 19 January – 1 February 2015	6 / 559	2R	(Romania) Marius Copil	194	Win	7–6^{(7–4)}, 7–6^{(7–4)}, 6–3
Australian Open; Melbourne, Australia; Grand Slam tournament Hard, outdoor 19 January – 1 February 2015	7 / 560	3R	(Finland) Jarkko Nieminen	72	Win	6–4, 6–2, 6–4
Australian Open; Melbourne, Australia; Grand Slam tournament Hard, outdoor 19 January – 1 February 2015	8 / 561	4R	(Spain) Guillermo García López	37	Win	7–6^{(7–2)}, 6–4, 4–6, 7–6^{(10–8)}
Australian Open; Melbourne, Australia; Grand Slam tournament Hard, outdoor 19 January – 1 February 2015	9 / 562	QF	(Japan) Kei Nishikori (5)	5	Win	6–3, 6–4, 7–6^{(8–6)}
Australian Open; Melbourne, Australia; Grand Slam tournament Hard, outdoor 19 January – 1 February 2015	10 / 563	SF	(Serbia) Novak Djokovic (1)	1	Loss	6–7^{(1–7)}, 6–3, 4–6, 6–4, 0–6
Rotterdam Open; Rotterdam, Netherlands; ATP 500; Hard, indoor 9–15 February 2015
Rotterdam Open; Rotterdam, Netherlands; ATP 500; Hard, indoor 9–15 February 2015	11 / 564	1R	(Netherlands) Jesse Huta Galung (WC)	248	Win	6–3, 3–6, 6–3
Rotterdam Open; Rotterdam, Netherlands; ATP 500; Hard, indoor 9–15 February 2015	12 / 565	2R	(Spain) Guillermo García López	27	Win	6–7^{(2–7)}, 6–4, 6–2
Rotterdam Open; Rotterdam, Netherlands; ATP 500; Hard, indoor 9–15 February 2015	13 / 566	QF	(Luxembourg) Gilles Müller	37	Win	7–6^{(7–3)}, 6–3
Rotterdam Open; Rotterdam, Netherlands; ATP 500; Hard, indoor 9–15 February 2015	14 / 567	SF	(Canada) Milos Raonic (2)	6	Win	7–6^{(7–3)}, 7–6^{(9–7)}
Rotterdam Open; Rotterdam, Netherlands; ATP 500; Hard, indoor 9–15 February 2015	15 / 568	W	(Czech Republic) Tomáš Berdych (3)	7	Win (2)	4–6, 6–3, 6–4
Open 13; Marseille, France; ATP 250; Hard, indoor 16–22 February 2015
Open 13; Marseille, France; ATP 250; Hard, indoor 16–22 February 2015	–	1R	Bye			
Open 13; Marseille, France; ATP 250; Hard, indoor 16–22 February 2015	16 / 569	2R	(France) Benoît Paire (WC)	121	Win	6–2, 6–3
Open 13; Marseille, France; ATP 250; Hard, indoor 16–22 February 2015	17 / 570	QF	(Ukraine) Sergiy Stakhovsky	59	Loss	4–6, 6–3, 4–6
Indian Wells Masters; Indian Wells, United States; ATP 1000; Hard, outdoor 12–22 March 2015
Indian Wells Masters; Indian Wells, United States; ATP 1000; Hard, outdoor 12–22 March 2015	–	1R	Bye			
Indian Wells Masters; Indian Wells, United States; ATP 1000; Hard, outdoor 12–22 March 2015	18 / 571	2R	(Netherlands) Robin Haase	104	Loss	3–6, 6–3, 3–6
Miami Open; Miami, United States; ATP 1000; Hard, outdoor 25 March – 05 April 2015
Miami Open; Miami, United States; ATP 1000; Hard, outdoor 25 March – 05 April 2015	–	1R	Bye			
Miami Open; Miami, United States; ATP 1000; Hard, outdoor 25 March – 05 April 2015	19 / 572	2R	(Argentina) Carlos Berlocq	68	Win	6–7^{(9–11)}, 7–5, 6–2
Miami Open; Miami, United States; ATP 1000; Hard, outdoor 25 March – 05 April 2015	20 / 573	3R	(France) Adrian Mannarino (28)	32	Loss	6–7^{(4–7)}, 6–7^{(5–7)}
Monte-Carlo Masters; Roquebrune-Cap-Martin, France; ATP 1000; Clay, outdoor 12–19 April 2015
Monte-Carlo Masters; Roquebrune-Cap-Martin, France; ATP 1000; Clay, outdoor 12–19 April 2015	–	1R	Bye			
Monte-Carlo Masters; Roquebrune-Cap-Martin, France; ATP 1000; Clay, outdoor 12–19 April 2015	21 / 574	2R	(Argentina) Juan Mónaco	42	Win	6–1, 6–4
Monte-Carlo Masters; Roquebrune-Cap-Martin, France; ATP 1000; Clay, outdoor 12–19 April 2015	22 / 575	3R	(Bulgaria) Grigor Dimitrov (9)	11	Loss	1–6, 2–6
Madrid Open; Madrid, Spain; ATP 1000; Clay, outdoor 4–10 May 2015
Madrid Open; Madrid, Spain; ATP 1000; Clay, outdoor 4–10 May 2015	–	1R	Bye			
Madrid Open; Madrid, Spain; ATP 1000; Clay, outdoor 4–10 May 2015	23 / 576	2R	(Portugal) João Sousa (LL)	56	Win	7–6^{(7–1)}, 7–5
Madrid Open; Madrid, Spain; ATP 1000; Clay, outdoor 4–10 May 2015	24 / 577	3R	(Bulgaria) Grigor Dimitrov (10)	11	Loss	6–7^{(5–7)}, 6–3, 3–6
Italian Open; Rome, Italy; ATP 1000; Clay, outdoor 11–17 May 2015
Italian Open; Rome, Italy; ATP 1000; Clay, outdoor 11–17 May 2015	–	1R	Bye			
Italian Open; Rome, Italy; ATP 1000; Clay, outdoor 11–17 May 2015	25 / 578	2R	(Argentina) Juan Mónaco	36	Win	4–6, 6–3, 6–2
Italian Open; Rome, Italy; ATP 1000; Clay, outdoor 11–17 May 2015	26 / 579	3R	(Austria) Dominic Thiem	49	Win	7–6^{(7–3)}, 6–4
Italian Open; Rome, Italy; ATP 1000; Clay, outdoor 11–17 May 2015	27 / 580	QF	(Spain) Rafael Nadal (4)	7	Win	7–6^{(9–7)}, 6–2
Italian Open; Rome, Italy; ATP 1000; Clay, outdoor 11–17 May 2015	28 / 581	SF	(Switzerland) Roger Federer (2)	2	Loss	4–6, 2–6
Geneva Open; Geneva, Switzerland; ATP 250; Clay, outdoor 17–23 May 2015
Geneva Open; Geneva, Switzerland; ATP 250; Clay, outdoor 17–23 May 2015	–	1R	Bye			
Geneva Open; Geneva, Switzerland; ATP 250; Clay, outdoor 17–23 May 2015	29 / 582	2R	(Czech Republic) Lukáš Rosol (Q)	49	Win	6–4, 3–6, 6–4
Geneva Open; Geneva, Switzerland; ATP 250; Clay, outdoor 17–23 May 2015	30 / 583	QF	(Argentina) Federico Delbonis	74	Loss	7–6^{(7–5)}, 4–6, 4–6
French Open; Paris, France; Grand Slam tournament Clay, outdoor 24 May – 7 June 2015
French Open; Paris, France; Grand Slam tournament Clay, outdoor 24 May – 7 June 2015	31 / 584	1R	(Turkey) Marsel İlhan	82	Win	6–3, 6–2, 6–3
French Open; Paris, France; Grand Slam tournament Clay, outdoor 24 May – 7 June 2015	32 / 585	2R	(Serbia) Dušan Lajović	75	Win	6–3, 6–4, 5–7, 6–3
French Open; Paris, France; Grand Slam tournament Clay, outdoor 24 May – 7 June 2015	33 / 586	3R	(United States) Steve Johnson	56	Win	6–4, 6–3, 6–2
French Open; Paris, France; Grand Slam tournament Clay, outdoor 24 May – 7 June 2015	34 / 587	4R	(France) Gilles Simon (12)	13	Win	6–1, 6–4, 6–2
French Open; Paris, France; Grand Slam tournament Clay, outdoor 24 May – 7 June 2015	35 / 588	QF	(Switzerland) Roger Federer (2)	2	Win	6–4, 6–3, 7–6^{(7–4)}
French Open; Paris, France; Grand Slam tournament Clay, outdoor 24 May – 7 June 2015	36 / 589	SF	(France) Jo-Wilfried Tsonga (14)	15	Win	6–3, 6–7^{(1–7)}, 7–6^{(7–3)}, 6–4
French Open; Paris, France; Grand Slam tournament Clay, outdoor 24 May – 7 June 2015	37 / 590	W	(Serbia) Novak Djokovic (1)	1	Win (3)	4–6, 6–4, 6–3, 6–4
Queen's Club Championships; London, United Kingdom; ATP 500; Grass, outdoor 15–21 June 2015
Queen's Club Championships; London, United Kingdom; ATP 500; Grass, outdoor 15–21 June 2015	38 / 591	1R	(Australia) Nick Kyrgios	28	Win	6–3, 6–4
Queen's Club Championships; London, United Kingdom; ATP 500; Grass, outdoor 15–21 June 2015	39 / 592	2R	(South Africa) Kevin Anderson	17	Loss	6–7^{(4–7)}, 6–7^{(11–13)}
Wimbledon Championships; London, United Kingdom; Grand Slam tournament Grass, outdoor 29 June – 12 July 2015
Wimbledon Championships; London, United Kingdom; Grand Slam tournament Grass, outdoor 29 June – 12 July 2015	40 / 593	1R	(Portugal) João Sousa	46	Win	6–2, 7–5, 7–6^{(7–3)}
Wimbledon Championships; London, United Kingdom; Grand Slam tournament Grass, outdoor 29 June – 12 July 2015	41 / 594	2R	(Dominican Republic) Víctor Estrella Burgos	48	Win	6–3, 6–4, 7–5
Wimbledon Championships; London, United Kingdom; Grand Slam tournament Grass, outdoor 29 June – 12 July 2015	42 / 595	3R	(Spain) Fernando Verdasco	43	Win	6–4, 6–3, 6–4
Wimbledon Championships; London, United Kingdom; Grand Slam tournament Grass, outdoor 29 June – 12 July 2015	43 / 596	4R	(Belgium) David Goffin (16)	15	Win	7–6^{(7–3)}, 7–6^{(9–7)}, 6–4
Wimbledon Championships; London, United Kingdom; Grand Slam tournament Grass, outdoor 29 June – 12 July 2015	44 / 597	QF	(France) Richard Gasquet (21)	20	Loss	4–6, 6–4, 6–3, 4–6, 9–11
Canadian Open; Montreal, Canada; ATP 1000; Hard, outdoor 10–16 August 2015
Canadian Open; Montreal, Canada; ATP 1000; Hard, outdoor 10–16 August 2015	–	1R	Bye			
Canadian Open; Montreal, Canada; ATP 1000; Hard, outdoor 10–16 August 2015	45 / 598	2R	(Australia) Nick Kyrgios	41	Loss	7–6^{(10–8)}, 3–6, 0–4, ret.
Cincinnati Masters; Cincinnati, United States; ATP 1000; Hard, outdoor 17–23 August 2015
Cincinnati Masters; Cincinnati, United States; ATP 1000; Hard, outdoor 17–23 August 2015	–	1R	Bye			
Cincinnati Masters; Cincinnati, United States; ATP 1000; Hard, outdoor 17–23 August 2015	46 / 599	2R	(Croatia) Borna Ćorić	38	Win	3–6, 7–6^{(7–3)}, 6–3
Cincinnati Masters; Cincinnati, United States; ATP 1000; Hard, outdoor 17–23 August 2015	47 / 600	3R	(Croatia) Ivo Karlović	21	Win	6–7^{(2–7)}, 7–6^{(7–5)}, 7–6^{(7–5)}
Cincinnati Masters; Cincinnati, United States; ATP 1000; Hard, outdoor 17–23 August 2015	48 / 601	QF	(Serbia) Novak Djokovic (1)	1	Loss	4–6, 1–6
US Open; New York City, United States; Grand Slam tournament Hard, outdoor 31 August – 13 September 2015
US Open; New York City, United States; Grand Slam tournament Hard, outdoor 31 August – 13 September 2015	49 / 602	1R	(Spain) Albert Ramos	58	Win	7–5, 6–4, 7–6^{(8–6)}
US Open; New York City, United States; Grand Slam tournament Hard, outdoor 31 August – 13 September 2015	50 / 603	2R	(South Korea) Chung Hyeon	69	Win	7–6^{(7–2)}, 7–6^{(7–4)}, 7–6^{(8–6)}
US Open; New York City, United States; Grand Slam tournament Hard, outdoor 31 August – 13 September 2015	51 / 604	3R	(Belgium) Ruben Bemelmans	107	Win	6–3, 7–6^{(7–5)}, 6–4
US Open; New York City, United States; Grand Slam tournament Hard, outdoor 31 August – 13 September 2015	52 / 605	4R	(United States) Donald Young	68	Win	6–3, 1–6, 6–3, 6–4
US Open; New York City, United States; Grand Slam tournament Hard, outdoor 31 August – 13 September 2015	53 / 606	QF	(South Africa) Kevin Anderson (15)	14	Win	6–4, 6–4, 6–0
US Open; New York City, United States; Grand Slam tournament Hard, outdoor 31 August – 13 September 2015	54 / 607	SF	(Switzerland) Roger Federer (2)	2	Loss	4–6, 3–6, 1–6
Davis Cup World Group play-offs Geneva, Switzerland; Davis Cup; Hard, indoor 18–20 September 2015
Davis Cup World Group play-offs Geneva, Switzerland; Davis Cup; Hard, indoor 18–20 September 2015	55 / 608	RR	(Netherlands) Thiemo de Bakker	144	Win	2–6, 6–3, 4–6, 6–3, 7–5
Moselle Open; Metz, France; ATP 250; Hard, indoor 21–27 September 2015
Moselle Open; Metz, France; ATP 250; Hard, indoor 21–27 September 2015	–	1R	Bye			
Moselle Open; Metz, France; ATP 250; Hard, indoor 21–27 September 2015	56 / 609	2R	(Germany) Dustin Brown	107	Win	4–6, 6–3, 7–6^{(7–4)}
Moselle Open; Metz, France; ATP 250; Hard, indoor 21–27 September 2015	–	QF	(Germany) Philipp Kohlschreiber	33	Withdrew	N/A
Japan Open; Tokyo, Japan; ATP 500; Hard, outdoor 5–11 October 2015
Japan Open; Tokyo, Japan; ATP 500; Hard, outdoor 5–11 October 2015	57 / 610	1R	(Czech Republic) Radek Štěpánek (PR)	255	Win	7–5, 6–3
Japan Open; Tokyo, Japan; ATP 500; Hard, outdoor 5–11 October 2015	58 / 611	2R	(Japan) Tatsuma Ito (WC)	127	Win	6–3, 2–6, 6–4
Japan Open; Tokyo, Japan; ATP 500; Hard, outdoor 5–11 October 2015	59 / 612	QF	(United States) Austin Krajicek (Q)	124	Win	6–3, 6–4
Japan Open; Tokyo, Japan; ATP 500; Hard, outdoor 5–11 October 2015	60 / 613	SF	(Luxembourg) Gilles Müller	43	Win	6–4, 7–6^{(7–5)}
Japan Open; Tokyo, Japan; ATP 500; Hard, outdoor 5–11 October 2015	61 / 614	W	(France) Benoît Paire	32	Win (4)	6–2, 6–4
Shanghai Masters; Shanghai, China; ATP 1000; Hard, outdoor 11–18 October 2015
Shanghai Masters; Shanghai, China; ATP 1000; Hard, outdoor 11–18 October 2015	–	1R	Bye			
Shanghai Masters; Shanghai, China; ATP 1000; Hard, outdoor 11–18 October 2015	62 / 615	2R	(Serbia) Viktor Troicki	24	Win	7–6^{(7–3)}, 6–3
Shanghai Masters; Shanghai, China; ATP 1000; Hard, outdoor 11–18 October 2015	63 / 616	3R	(Croatia) Marin Čilić (14)	12	Win	7–5, 6–7^{(7–9)}, 6–4
Shanghai Masters; Shanghai, China; ATP 1000; Hard, outdoor 11–18 October 2015	64 / 617	QF	(Spain) Rafael Nadal (8)	7	Loss	2–6, 1–6
Swiss Indoors; Basel, Switzerland; ATP 500; Hard, indoor 26 October – 1 November 2015
Swiss Indoors; Basel, Switzerland; ATP 500; Hard, indoor 26 October – 1 November 2015	65 / 618	1R	(Croatia) Ivo Karlović	23	Loss	6–3, 6–7^{(2–7)}, 4–6
Paris Masters; Paris, France; ATP 1000; Hard, indoor 2–8 November 2015
Paris Masters; Paris, France; ATP 1000; Hard, indoor 2–8 November 2015	–	1R	Bye			
Paris Masters; Paris, France; ATP 1000; Hard, indoor 2–8 November 2015	66 / 619	2R	(Australia) Bernard Tomic	18	Win	6–3, 7–6^{(7–5)}
Paris Masters; Paris, France; ATP 1000; Hard, indoor 2–8 November 2015	67 / 620	3R	(Serbia) Viktor Troicki	27	Win	6–4, 7–5
Paris Masters; Paris, France; ATP 1000; Hard, indoor 2–8 November 2015	68 / 621	QF	(Spain) Rafael Nadal (7)	6	Win	7–6^{(10–8)}, 7–6^{(9–7)}
Paris Masters; Paris, France; ATP 1000; Hard, indoor 2–8 November 2015	69 / 622	SF	(Serbia) Novak Djokovic (1)	1	Loss	3–6, 6–3, 0–6
ATP World Tour Finals; London, United Kingdom; ATP Finals; Hard, indoor 15–22 November 2015
ATP World Tour Finals; London, United Kingdom; ATP Finals; Hard, indoor 15–22 November 2015	70 / 623	RR	(Spain) Rafael Nadal (5)	5	Loss	3–6, 2–6
ATP World Tour Finals; London, United Kingdom; ATP Finals; Hard, indoor 15–22 November 2015	71 / 624	RR	(Spain) David Ferrer (7)	7	Win	7–5, 6–2
ATP World Tour Finals; London, United Kingdom; ATP Finals; Hard, indoor 15–22 November 2015	72 / 625	RR	(United Kingdom) Andy Murray (2)	2	Win	7–6^{(7–4)}, 6–4
ATP World Tour Finals; London, United Kingdom; ATP Finals; Hard, indoor 15–22 November 2015	73 / 626	SF	(Switzerland) Roger Federer (3)	3	Loss	5–7, 3–6

=== Doubles matches ===
Tournament	Match	Round	Opponents (seed or key)	Ranks	Result	Score
Aircel Chennai Open; Chennai, India; ATP 250; Hard, outdoor 5–11 January 2015; Partner: (Spain) Roberto Bautista Agut
Aircel Chennai Open; Chennai, India; ATP 250; Hard, outdoor 5–11 January 2015; Partner: (Spain) Roberto Bautista Agut	1	2R	(Sweden) Johan Brunström (United States) Nicholas Monroe (3)	#63 / #65	Win	5–7, 6–3, [10–8]
Aircel Chennai Open; Chennai, India; ATP 250; Hard, outdoor 5–11 January 2015; Partner: (Spain) Roberto Bautista Agut	2	QF	(India) Purav Raja (Canada) Adil Shamasdin	#146 / #74	Loss	6–7^{(5–7)}, 6–4, [4–10]
Indian Wells Masters; Indian Wells, USA; ATP 1000; Hard, outdoor 9–22 March 2015; Partner: (Poland) Łukasz Kubot
Indian Wells Masters; Indian Wells, USA; ATP 1000; Hard, outdoor 9–22 March 2015; Partner: (Poland) Łukasz Kubot	3	1R	(Croatia) Ivan Dodig (Brazil) Marcelo Melo (2)	#6 / #3	Loss	6–7^{(1–7)}, 2–6
Monte-Carlo Masters; Roquebrune-Cap-Martin, France; ATP 1000; Clay, outdoor 12–19 April 2015; Partner: (France) Benoît Paire
Monte-Carlo Masters; Roquebrune-Cap-Martin, France; ATP 1000; Clay, outdoor 12–19 April 2015; Partner: (France) Benoît Paire	4	1R	(India) Rohan Bopanna (Romania) Florin Mergea	#24 / #18	Win	6–7^{(6–8)}, 6–4, [10–7]
Monte-Carlo Masters; Roquebrune-Cap-Martin, France; ATP 1000; Clay, outdoor 12–19 April 2015; Partner: (France) Benoît Paire	5	2R	(Canada) Daniel Nestor (India) Leander Paes (6)	#7 / #23	Win	6–4, 7–6^{(7–4)}
Monte-Carlo Masters; Roquebrune-Cap-Martin, France; ATP 1000; Clay, outdoor 12–19 April 2015; Partner: (France) Benoît Paire	6	QF	(Poland) Marcin Matkowski (Serbia) Nenad Zimonjić (4)	#21 / #4	Loss	2–6, 3–6
Queen's Club Championships; London, United Kingdom; ATP 500; Grass, outdoor 15–21 June 2015; Partner: (Bulgaria) Grigor Dimitrov
Queen's Club Championships; London, United Kingdom; ATP 500; Grass, outdoor 15–21 June 2015; Partner: (Bulgaria) Grigor Dimitrov	7	1R	(Poland) Marcin Matkowski (Serbia) Nenad Zimonjić (2)	#27 / #3	Loss	6–7^{(5–7)}, 6–7^{(3–7)}
Cincinnati Masters; Cincinnati, United States; ATP 1000; Hard, outdoor 17–23 August 2015; Partner: (India) Leander Paes
Cincinnati Masters; Cincinnati, United States; ATP 1000; Hard, outdoor 17–23 August 2015; Partner: (India) Leander Paes	8	1R	(South Africa) Kevin Anderson (France) Jérémy Chardy	#69 / #41	Win	1–6, 6–1, [10–6]
Cincinnati Masters; Cincinnati, United States; ATP 1000; Hard, outdoor 17–23 August 2015; Partner: (India) Leander Paes	9	2R	(Canada) Vasek Pospisil (United States) Jack Sock (8)	#17 / #21	Win	7–6^{(7–4)}, 3–6, [10–3]
Cincinnati Masters; Cincinnati, United States; ATP 1000; Hard, outdoor 17–23 August 2015; Partner: (India) Leander Paes	10	QF	(Spain) Feliciano López (Belarus) Max Mirnyi	#52 / #36	Loss	6–3, 2–6, [12–14]

== Tournament Schedule ==
=== Singles schedule ===
Date	Tournament	City	Category	Surface	2014 result	2014 points	2015 points	Outcome
05.01.2015–11.01.2015	Chennai Open	Chennai	ATP World Tour 250	Hard	W	250	250	Winner (def. Aljaž Bedene, 6–3, 6–4)
19.01.2015–01.02.2015	Australian Open	Melbourne	Grand Slam	Hard	W	2000	720	Semifinals (lost to Novak Djokovic, 6–7^{(1–7)}, 6–3, 4–6, 6–4, 0–6)
09.02.2015–15.02.2015	Rotterdam Open	Rotterdam	ATP World Tour 500	Hard (i)	A	0	500	Winner (def. Tomáš Berdych, 4–6, 6–3, 6–4)
16.02.2015–22.02.2015	Open 13	Marseille	ATP World Tour 250	Hard (i)	A	0	45	Quarterfinals (lost to Sergiy Stakhovsky, 4–6, 6–3, 4–6)
12.03.2015–22.03.2015	Indian Wells Masters	Indian Wells	ATP Masters 1000	Hard	4R	90	10	Second round (lost to Robin Haase, 3–6, 6–3, 3–6)
25.03.2015–05.04.2015	Miami Open	Miami	ATP Masters 1000	Hard	4R	90	45	Third round (lost to Adrian Mannarino, 6–7^{(4–7)}, 6–7^{(5–7)})
12.04.2015–19.04.2015	Monte-Carlo Masters	Roquebrune-Cap-Martin	ATP Masters 1000	Clay	W	1000	90	Third round (lost to Grigor Dimitrov, 1–6, 2–6)
03.05.2015–10.05.2015	Madrid Open	Madrid	ATP Masters 1000	Clay	2R	10	90	Third round (lost to Grigor Dimitrov, 6–7^{(5–7)}, 6–3, 3–6)
10.05.2015–17.05.2015	Italian Open	Rome	ATP Masters 1000	Clay	3R	90	360	Semifinals (lost to Roger Federer, 4–6, 2–6)
17.05.2015–23.05.2015	Geneva Open	Geneva	ATP World Tour 250	Clay	A	0	45	Quarterfinals (lost to Federico Delbonis, 7–6^{(7–5)}, 4–6, 4–6)
24.05.2015–07.06.2015	French Open	Paris	Grand Slam	Clay	1R	10	2000	Winner (def. Novak Djokovic, 4–6, 6–4, 6–3, 6–4)
15.06.2015–21.06.2015	Queen's Club Championships	London	ATP World Tour 500	Grass	SF	90	45	Second round (lost to Kevin Anderson, 6–7^{(4–7)}, 6–7^{(11–13)})
29.06.2015–12.07.2015	Wimbledon	London	Grand Slam	Grass	QF	360	360	Quarterfinals (lost to Richard Gasquet, 4–6, 6–4, 6–3, 4–6, 9–11)
10.08.2015–16.08.2015	Canadian Open	Montreal	ATP Masters 1000	Hard	3R	90	10	Second round (lost to Nick Kyrgios, 7–6^{(10–8)}, 3–6, 0–4 ret.)
17.08.2015–23.08.2015	Cincinnati Masters	Cincinnati	ATP Masters 1000	Hard	QF	180	180	Quarterfinals (lost to Novak Djokovic, 4–6, 1–6)
31.08.2015–13.09.2015	US Open	New York City	Grand Slam	Hard	QF	360	720	Semifinals (lost to Roger Federer, 4–6, 3–6, 1–6)
18.09.2015–20.09.2015	Davis Cup World Group play-offs: Switzerland vs. Netherlands	Geneva	Davis Cup	Hard (i)	N/A	N/A	5	Switzerland def. Netherlands, 4–1; Switzerland advanced to 2016 World Group
21.09.2015–27.09.2015	Moselle Open	Metz	ATP World Tour 250	Hard (i)	A	0	45	Second round (withdrew before match against Philipp Kohlschreiber)
05.10.2015–11.10.2015	Japan Open	Tokyo	ATP World Tour 500	Hard	1R	0	500	Winner (def. Benoît Paire, 6–4, 6–4)
12.10.2015–18.10.2015	Shanghai Masters	Shanghai	ATP Masters 1000	Hard	2R	45	180	Quarterfinals (lost to Rafael Nadal, 2–6, 1–6)
24.10.2015–01.11.2015	Swiss Indoors	Basel	ATP World Tour 500	Hard (i)	1R	0	0	First round (lost to Ivo Karlović, 6–3, 6–7^{(2–7)}, 4–6)
02.11.2015–08.11.2015	Paris Masters	Paris	ATP Masters 1000	Hard (i)	3R	90	360	Semifinals (lost to Novak Djokovic, 3–6, 6–3, 0–6)
15.11.2015–22.11.2015	ATP World Tour Finals	London	ATP World Tour Finals	Hard (i)	SF	400	400	Semifinals (lost to Roger Federer, 7–5, 6–3)
Total year-end points						5370	6900	▲1530 difference

== Yearly records ==
=== Head-to-head matchups ===
Stan Wawrinka had a 55–18 match win–loss record in the 2015 season. His record against players who were part of the ATP rankings Top Ten at the time of their meetings was 9–8. Bold indicates player was ranked top 10 at time of meeting. The following list is ordered by number of wins:

- (Luxembourg) Gilles Müller 3–0
- (Croatia) Borna Ćorić 2–0
- (Turkey) Marsel İlhan 2–0
- (Spain) Guillermo García López 2–0
- (Belgium) David Goffin 2–0
- (Argentina) Juan Mónaco 2–0
- (France) Benoît Paire 2–0
- (Portugal) João Sousa 2–0
- (Serbia) Viktor Troicki 2–0
- (Spain) **Rafael Nadal** 2–2
- (Netherlands) Thiemo de Bakker 1–0
- (Slovenia) Aljaž Bedene 1–0
- (Belgium) Ruben Bemelmans 1–0
- (Czech Republic) **Tomáš Berdych** 1–0
- (Argentina) Carlos Berlocq 1–0
- (Germany) Dustin Brown 1–0
- (Croatia) Marin Čilić 1–0
- (Romania) Marius Copil 1–0
- (Spain) **David Ferrer** 1–0
- (South Korea) Chung Hyeon 1–0
- (Netherlands) Jesse Huta Galung 1–0
- (United States) Steve Johnson 1–0
- (United States) Austin Krajicek 1–0
- (Japan) Tatsuma Ito 1–0
- (Serbia) Dušan Lajović 1–0
- (United Kingdom) **Andy Murray** 1–0
- (Finland) Jarkko Nieminen 1–0
- (Japan) **Kei Nishikori** 1–0
- (Spain) Albert Ramos 1–0
- (Canada) **Milos Raonic** 1–0
- (Czech Republic) Lukáš Rosol 1–0
- (France) Gilles Simon 1–0
- (Czech Republic) Radek Štěpánek 1–0
- (Australia) Bernard Tomić 1–0
- (Austria) Dominic Thiem 1–0
- (France) Jo-Wilfried Tsonga 1–0
- (Dominican Republic) Víctor Estrella Burgos 1–0
- (Spain) Fernando Verdasco 1–0
- (United States) Donald Young 1–0
- (South Africa) Kevin Anderson 1–1
- (Croatia) Ivo Karlović 1–1
- (Australia) Nick Kyrgios 1–1
- (Serbia) **Novak Djokovic** 1–3
- (Switzerland) **Roger Federer** 1–3
- (France) Richard Gasquet 0–1
- (Argentina) Federico Delbonis 0–1
- (Netherlands) Robin Haase 0–1
- (France) Adrian Mannarino 0–1
- (Ukraine) Sergiy Stakhovsky 0–1
- (Bulgaria) Grigor Dimitrov 0–2

=== Finals ===
==== Singles: 4 (4–0) ====
Category Grand Slam (1–0) ATP World Tour Finals (0–0) ATP World Tour Masters 1000 (0–0) ATP World Tour 500 (2–0) ATP World Tour 250 (1–0)	Titles by surface Hard (3–0) Clay (1–0) Grass (0–0)	Titles by conditions Outdoors (3–0) Indoors (1–0)

Outcome	No.	Date	Championship	Surface	Opponent	Score
Winner	8.	11 January 2015	Chennai Open, Chennai, India (3)	Hard	(Slovenia) Aljaž Bedene	7–5, 6–2
Winner	9.	26 February 2015	Rotterdam Open, Rotterdam, Netherlands	Hard (i)	(Czech Republic) Tomáš Berdych	4–6, 6–3, 6–4
Winner	10.	7 June 2015	French Open, Paris, France	Clay	(Serbia) Novak Djokovic	4–6, 6–4, 6–3, 6–4
Winner	11.	11 October 2015	Japan Open, Tokyo, Japan	Hard	(France) Benoît Paire	6–2, 6–4

=== Earnings ===
Event	Prize money	Year-to-date
**Aircel Chennai Open**	$75,215	$75,215
Australian Open	A$650,000	$651,410
**ABN AMRO World Tennis Tournament**	$358,540	$1,009,950
Open 13	$16,730	$1,026,680
Indian Wells Masters	$22,290	$1,048,970
Miami Masters	$31,670	$1,080,640
Monte-Carlo Masters	€53,190	$1,124,014
Madrid Open	€52,090	$1,182,355
Italian Open	€155,000	$1,355,887
Geneva Open	€12,990	$1,390,749
**French Open**	€1,800,000	$3,372,009
Aegon Championships	€20,060	$3,374,607
Wimbledon Championships	£241,000	$3,753,868
Canadian Open	$23,540	$3,777,409
Cincinnati Masters	$105,980	$3,883,389
US Open	$805,000	$4,674,123
Moselle Open	$12,990	$4,688,796
**Japan Open**	$306,200	$4,994,995
Shanghai Masters	$114,645	$5,109,640
Swiss Indoors	€11,035	$5,121,797
Paris Masters	€161,320	$5,299,265
ATP World Tour Finals	$501,000	$6,510,265
		$6,510,265

Figures in United States dollars (USD) unless noted.

== See also ==
- 2015 ATP World Tour
- 2015 Roger Federer tennis season
- 2015 Rafael Nadal tennis season
- 2015 Novak Djokovic tennis season
- 2015 Andy Murray tennis season
