= 2015 Shanghai Rolex Masters – Singles =

Singles
- 2015 Shanghai Rolex Masters

Final
- Champion: (Serbia) Novak Djokovic
- Runner-up: (France) Jo-Wilfried Tsonga
- Score: 6–2, 6–4

Events
Singles	Doubles
← 2014 ·	Shanghai Masters	· 2016 →

Novak Djokovic defeated Jo-Wilfried Tsonga in the final, 6–2, 6–4 to win the singles tennis title at the 2015 Shanghai Masters. He did not lose a single set in the entire tournament.

Roger Federer was the defending champion, but lost in the second round to Albert Ramos Viñolas.

== Seeds ==
The top eight seeds receive a bye into the second round.

1. (Serbia) Novak Djokovic (champion)
2. (Switzerland) Roger Federer (second round)
3. (United Kingdom) Andy Murray (semifinals)
4. (Switzerland) Stan Wawrinka (quarterfinals)
5. (Czech Republic) Tomáš Berdych (quarterfinals)
6. (Japan) Kei Nishikori (third round)
7. (Spain) David Ferrer (second round)
8. (Spain) Rafael Nadal (semifinals)

9. (Canada) Milos Raonic (third round)
10. (France) Gilles Simon (third round)
11. (France) Richard Gasquet (third round)
12. (South Africa) Kevin Anderson (quarterfinals)
13. (United States) John Isner (third round)
14. (Croatia) Marin Čilić (third round)
15. (Spain) Feliciano López (third round)
16. (France) Jo-Wilfried Tsonga (final)

Click on the seed number of a player to go to their draw section.

== Draw ==
=== Key ===
- Q = Qualifier
- WC = Wild card
- LL = Lucky loser
- Alt = Alternate
- SE = Special exempt
- PR = Protected ranking
- ITF = ITF entry
- JE = Junior exempt
- w/o = Walkover
- r = Retired
- d = Defaulted
- SR = Special ranking

=== Finals ===
Quarterfinals
1	(Serbia) Novak Djokovic	7^{8}	6
(Australia) Bernard Tomic	6^{6}	1
3	(United Kingdom) Andy Murray	6	6
5	(Czech Republic) Tomáš Berdych	1	3
8	(Spain) Rafael Nadal	6	6
4	(Switzerland) Stan Wawrinka	2	1
12	(South Africa) Kevin Anderson	6^{6}	7	4
16	(France) Jo-Wilfried Tsonga	7^{8}	5	6

Semifinals
1	(Serbia) Novak Djokovic	6	6
3	(United Kingdom) Andy Murray	1	3
8	(Spain) Rafael Nadal	4	6	5
16	(France) Jo-Wilfried Tsonga	6	0	7

Final
1	(Serbia) Novak Djokovic	6	6
16	(France) Jo-Wilfried Tsonga	2	4

=== Top half ===
==== Section 1 ====
First round
(Slovakia) M Kližan	7^{10}	6
WC	(China) Ze Zhang	6^{8}	2
Q	(Chinese Taipei) Y-h Lu	3	3
(Austria) D Thiem	6	6
Q	(Russia) A Kuznetsov	4	6^{3}
15	(Spain) F López	6	7^{7}
11	(France) R Gasquet	7^{7}	6
(Luxembourg) G Müller	6^{4}	2
Q	(Italy) S Bolelli	3	4
(Canada) V Pospisil	6	6
(Spain) F Verdasco	3	6^{3}
(Australia) B Tomic	6	7^{7}

Second round
1	(Serbia) N Djokovic	6	6
(Slovakia) M Kližan	2	1
(Austria) D Thiem	7^{7}	6^{6}	3
15	(Spain) F López	6^{4}	7^{8}	6
11	(France) R Gasquet	6	3	6
(Canada) V Pospisil	4	6	4
(Australia) B Tomic	6	6
7	(Spain) D Ferrer	4	2

Third round
1	(Serbia) N Djokovic	6	6
15	(Spain) F López	2	3
11	(France) R Gasquet	3	7^{7}	4
(Australia) B Tomic	6	6^{1}	6

Quarterfinals
1	(Serbia) N Djokovic	7^{8}	6
(Australia) B Tomic	6^{6}	1

==== Section 2 ====
First round
(United States) S Johnson	4	6	7^{7}
(Italy) A Seppi	6	1	6^{2}
(Belgium) D Goffin	6	6
Q	(Japan) G Soeda	4	2
(France) A Mannarino	1	2
13	(United States) J Isner	6	6
10	(France) G Simon	6	4	6
Q	(Georgia (country)) N Basilashvili	3	6	0
(Argentina) L Mayer	6	6
WC	(China) Y Bai	0	1
Q	(Poland) Ł Kubot	4	2
(United States) J Sock	6	6

Second round
3	(United Kingdom) A Murray	6	6
(United States) S Johnson	2	4
(Belgium) D Goffin	3	6^{5}
13	(United States) J Isner	6	7^{7}
10	(France) G Simon	6^{0}	6	6
(Argentina) L Mayer	7^{7}	4	2
(United States) J Sock	6^{3}	6	4
5	(Czech Republic) T Berdych	7^{7}	4	6

Third round
3	(United Kingdom) A Murray	6^{4}	6	6
13	(United States) J Isner	7^{7}	4	4
10	(France) G Simon	3	3
5	(Czech Republic) T Berdych	6	6

Quarterfinals
3	(United Kingdom) A Murray	6	6
5	(Czech Republic) T Berdych	1	3

=== Bottom half ===
==== Section 3 ====
First round
(Croatia) I Karlović	6	7^{8}
(France) J Chardy	4	6^{6}
(Spain) R Bautista Agut	6	6
(Spain) G García López	2	3
(Brazil) T Bellucci	6^{5}	6^{2}
9	(Canada) M Raonic	7^{7}	7^{7}
14	(Croatia) M Čilić	4	6	7^{7}
WC	(China) D Wu	6	3	6^{4}
(Ukraine) A Dolgopolov	3	6	6^{5}
(Croatia) B Ćorić	6	1	7^{7}
(Uruguay) P Cuevas	6	4	4
(Serbia) V Troicki	2	6	6

Second round
8	(Spain) R Nadal	7	6^{4}	7^{7}
(Croatia) I Karlović	5	7^{7}	6^{4}
(Spain) R Bautista Agut	4	7^{7}	6^{5}
9	(Canada) M Raonic	6	6^{3}	7^{7}
14	(Croatia) M Čilić	6	6
(Croatia) B Ćorić	1	2
(Serbia) V Troicki	6^{3}	3
4	(Switzerland) S Wawrinka	7^{7}	6

Third round
8	(Spain) R Nadal	6	7^{7}
9	(Canada) M Raonic	3	6^{3}
14	(Croatia) M Čilić	5	7^{9}	4
4	(Switzerland) S Wawrinka	7	6^{7}	6

Quarterfinals
8	(Spain) R Nadal	6	6
4	(Switzerland) S Wawrinka	2	1

==== Section 4 ====
First round
(Australia) N Kyrgios	6	6
(Austria) A Haider-Maurer	3	2
(Italy) F Fognini	7^{7}	6
(Portugal) J Sousa	6^{2}	3
WC	(Germany) T Haas	3	5
12	(South Africa) K Anderson	6	7
16	(France) J-W Tsonga	6^{5}	6	6
(Spain) T Robredo	7^{7}	2	2
(Dominican Republic) V Estrella Burgos	6	4	6
LL	(United States) D Young	2	6	4
(United States) S Querrey	6	4	5
Q	(Spain) A Ramos Viñolas	4	6	7

Second round
6	(Japan) K Nishikori	1	6	6
(Australia) N Kyrgios	6	4	4
(Italy) F Fognini	3	6^{1}
12	(South Africa) K Anderson	6	7^{7}
16	(France) J-W Tsonga	6	6
(Dominican Republic) V Estrella Burgos	3	2
Q	(Spain) A Ramos Viñolas	7^{7}	2	6
2	(Switzerland) R Federer	6^{4}	6	3

Third round
6	(Japan) K Nishikori	6^{10}	6^{3}
12	(South Africa) K Anderson	7^{12}	7^{7}
16	(France) J-W Tsonga	6^{5}	7	6
Q	(Spain) A Ramos Viñolas	7^{7}	5	4

Quarterfinals
12	(South Africa) K Anderson	6^{6}	7	4
16	(France) J-W Tsonga	7^{8}	5	6

== Qualifying ==
=== Seeds ===
1. (United States) Donald Young (qualifying competition, lucky loser)
2. (South Korea) Chung Hyeon (qualifying competition)
3. (Italy) Simone Bolelli (qualified)
4. (France) Nicolas Mahut (qualifying competition)
5. (France) Lucas Pouille (first round)
6. (Spain) Albert Ramos Viñolas (qualified)
7. (Georgia (country)) Nikoloz Basilashvili (qualified)
8. (Russia) Andrey Kuznetsov (qualified)
9. (United States) Rajeev Ram (first round)
10. (Chinese Taipei) Lu Yen-hsun (qualified)
11. (Germany) Michael Berrer (qualifying competition)
12. (France) Pierre-Hugues Herbert (qualifying competition, retired)
13. (Japan) Go Soeda (qualified)
14. (United States) Austin Krajicek (qualifying competition)

=== Qualifiers ===
1. (Russia) Andrey Kuznetsov
2. (Japan) Go Soeda
3. (Italy) Simone Bolelli
4. (Chinese Taipei) Lu Yen-hsun
5. (Poland) Łukasz Kubot
6. (Spain) Albert Ramos Viñolas
7. (Georgia (country)) Nikoloz Basilashvili

=== Lucky loser ===
1. (United States) Donald Young

=== Qualifying draw ===
==== First qualifier ====
First round
1	(United States) Donald Young	6	6
WC	(China) Qiu Zhuoyang	4	0
WC	(China) He Yecong	2	7	3^{r}
8	(Russia) Andrey Kuznetsov	6	5	5

Qualifying competition
1	(United States) Donald Young	3	1
8	(Russia) Andrey Kuznetsov	6	6

==== Second qualifier ====
First round
2	(South Korea) Chung Hyeon	6	6
Alt	(Russia) Teymuraz Gabashvili	3	2
Alt	(China) Sun Fajing	0	0
13	(Japan) Go Soeda	6	6

Qualifying competition
2	(South Korea) Chung Hyeon	6	5	3
13	(Japan) Go Soeda	0	7	6

==== Third qualifier ====
First round
3	(Italy) Simone Bolelli	6	6
(Italy) Matteo Donati	4	3
(Poland) Michał Przysiężny	6	6
9	(United States) Rajeev Ram	4	3

Qualifying competition
3	(Italy) Simone Bolelli	7^{7}	5	6
(Poland) Michał Przysiężny	6^{2}	7	1

==== Fourth qualifier ====
First round
4	(France) Nicolas Mahut	6^{4}	6	7
(Australia) Matthew Ebden	7^{7}	3	5
(Japan) Yoshihito Nishioka	1	0
10	(Chinese Taipei) Lu Yen-hsun	6	6

Qualifying competition
4	(France) Nicolas Mahut	7^{7}	2	0
10	(Chinese Taipei) Lu Yen-hsun	6^{3}	6	6

==== Fifth qualifier ====
First round
5	(France) Lucas Pouille	4	4
(Poland) Łukasz Kubot	6	6
(South Korea) Jun Woong-sun	3	2
12	(France) Pierre-Hugues Herbert	6	6

Qualifying competition
(Poland) Łukasz Kubot	1
12	(France) Pierre-Hugues Herbert	2^{r}

==== Sixth qualifier ====
First round
6	(Spain) Albert Ramos Viñolas	6	6
WC	(China) Zhang Zhizhen	4	3
WC	(China) Gong Maoxin	6^{3}	0
11	(Germany) Michael Berrer	7^{7}	6

Qualifying competition
6	(Spain) Albert Ramos Viñolas	6	7^{7}
11	(Germany) Michael Berrer	4	6^{4}

==== Seventh qualifier ====
First round
7	(Georgia (country)) Nikoloz Basilashvili	6	6
(Japan) Shuichi Sekiguchi	4	2
Alt	(Thailand) Danai Udomchoke	2	1
14	(United States) Austin Krajicek	6	6

Qualifying competition
7	(Georgia (country)) Nikoloz Basilashvili	6	7^{8}
14	(United States) Austin Krajicek	3	6^{6}
