= 2015 Gerry Weber Open =

Grass court tennis tournament held in Germany

- Date: 15–21 June
- Edition: 23rd
- Category: ATP World Tour 500
- Draw: 32S / 16D
- Prize money: €1,574,640
- Surface: Grass
- Location: Halle, Germany
- Venue: Gerry Weber Stadion

Champions

Singles
- (Switzerland) Roger Federer

Doubles
- (South Africa) Raven Klaasen / (United States) Rajeev Ram
← 2014 ·	Gerry Weber Open	· 2016 →

The 2015 Gerry Weber Open was a men's tennis tournament played on outdoor grass courts. It was the 23rd edition of the event known that year as the Gerry Weber Open and part of the ATP World Tour 500 series of the 2015 ATP World Tour. It took place at the Gerry Weber Stadion in Halle, Germany, between 15 June and 21 June 2015. First-seeded Roger Federer won his eighth singles title at the event.

== Points and prize money ==
=== Point distribution ===
Event	W	F	SF	QF	Round of 16	Round of 32	Q	Q2	Q1
Singles	500	300	180	90	45	0	20	10	0
Doubles	500	300	180	90	45	0	—	—	—

=== Prize money ===
Event	W	F	SF	QF	Round of 16	Round of 32	Q	Q2	Q1
Singles	€381,760	€172,100	€81,530	€39,340	€20,060	€11,035	€0	€1,240	€685
Doubles*	€112,780	€50,880	€23,990	€11,600	€5,950	—	—	—	—

_{*per team}

== Singles main-draw entrants ==
=== Seeds ===
Country	Player	Rank^{1}	Seed
SUI	Roger Federer	2	1
JPN	Kei Nishikori	5	2
CZE	Tomáš Berdych	6	3
FRA	Gaël Monfils	16	4
ESP	Tommy Robredo	20	5
URU	Pablo Cuevas	23	6
AUS	Bernard Tomic	24	7
CRO	Ivo Karlović	27	8

- ^{1} Rankings are as of June 8, 2015.

=== Other entrants ===
The following players received wildcards into the singles main draw:

- (Germany) Dustin Brown
- (Germany) Jan-Lennard Struff
- (Germany) Alexander Zverev

The following players received entry from the qualifying draw:

- (Lithuania) Ričardas Berankis
- (Colombia) Alejandro Falla
- (Slovakia) Lukáš Lacko
- (Finland) Jarkko Nieminen

=== Withdrawals ===
Before the tournament

- (Germany) Benjamin Becker →replaced by Borna Ćorić
- (France) Jo-Wilfried Tsonga →replaced by Steve Johnson

=== Retirements ===
- (France) Gaël Monfils
- (Japan) Kei Nishikori

== Doubles main-draw entrants ==
=== Seeds ===
Country	Player	Country	Player	Rank^{1}	Seed
NED	Jean-Julien Rojer	ROU	Horia Tecău	15	1
IND	Rohan Bopanna	ROU	Florin Mergea	34	2
AUT	Julian Knowle	CAN	Vasek Pospisil	41	3
URU	Pablo Cuevas	ESP	David Marrero	52	4

- Rankings are as of June 8, 2015.

=== Other entrants ===
The following pairs received wildcards into the doubles main draw:

- (Germany) Dustin Brown / (Germany) Jan-Lennard Struff
- (Germany) Alexander Zverev / (Germany) Mischa Zverev

The following pair received entry from the qualifying draw:

- (Czech Republic) Lukáš Rosol / (Ukraine) Sergiy Stakhovsky

== Finals ==
=== Singles ===
- (Switzerland) Roger Federer defeated (Italy) Andreas Seppi, 7–6^{(7–1)}, 6–4

=== Doubles ===
- (South Africa) Raven Klaasen / (United States) Rajeev Ram defeated (India) Rohan Bopanna / (Romania) Florin Mergea, 7–6^{(7–5)}, 6–2
