= 2015 Shanghai Rolex Masters =

- Date: October 11–18
- Edition: 7th
- Category: ATP World Tour Masters 1000
- Surface: Hard / Outdoor
- Location: Shanghai, China
- Venue: Qizhong Forest Sports City Arena

Champions

Singles
- (Serbia) Novak Djokovic

Doubles
- (South Africa) Raven Klaasen / (Brazil) Marcelo Melo
← 2014 ·	Shanghai Masters	· 2016 →

The 2015 Shanghai Rolex Masters was a tennis tournament played on outdoor hard courts. It was the seventh edition of the Shanghai ATP Masters 1000, classified as an ATP World Tour Masters 1000 event on the 2015 ATP World Tour. It took place at Qizhong Forest Sports City Arena in Shanghai, China from October 11 to October 18, 2015.

== Points and prize money ==
=== Point distribution ===
Event	W	F	SF	QF	Round of 16	Round of 32	Round of 64	Q	Q2	Q1
Singles	1,000	600	360	180	90	45	10	25	16	0
Doubles	1,000	600	360	180	90	0	—	—	—	—

=== Prize money ===
Event	W	F	SF	QF	Round of 16	Round of 32	Round of 64	Q2	Q1
Singles	$913,600	$448,000	$225,460	$114,645	$59,535	$31,390	$16,945	$3,905	$1,990
Doubles	$282,930	$138,520	$69,480	$35,660	$18,430	$9,730	—	—	—

== Singles main-draw entrants ==
=== Seeds ===
Country	Player	Rank^{1}	Seed
SRB	Novak Djokovic	1	1
SUI	Roger Federer	2	2
GBR	Andy Murray	3	3
SUI	Stan Wawrinka	4	4
CZE	Tomáš Berdych	5	5
JPN	Kei Nishikori	6	6
ESP	David Ferrer	7	7
ESP	Rafael Nadal	8	8
CAN	Milos Raonic	9	9
FRA	Gilles Simon	10	10
FRA	Richard Gasquet	11	11
RSA	Kevin Anderson	12	12
USA	John Isner	13	13
CRO	Marin Čilić	14	14
ESP	Feliciano López	15	15
FRA	Jo-Wilfried Tsonga	16	16

- ^{1} Rankings are as of October 5, 2015

=== Other entrants ===
The following players received wildcards into the singles main draw:

- (China) Bai Yan
- (Germany) Tommy Haas
- (China) Wu Di
- (China) Zhang Ze

The following players received entry from the qualifying draw:

- (Georgia (country)) Nikoloz Basilashvili
- (Italy) Simone Bolelli
- (Poland) Łukasz Kubot
- (Russia) Andrey Kuznetsov
- (Chinese Taipei) Lu Yen-hsun
- (Spain) Albert Ramos Viñolas
- (Japan) Go Soeda

The following player received entry as a lucky loser:

- (United States) Donald Young

=== Withdrawals ===
Before the tournament

- (Bulgaria) Grigor Dimitrov → replaced by (United States) Steve Johnson
- (Germany) Philipp Kohlschreiber → replaced by (Dominican Republic) Víctor Estrella Burgos
- (Germany) Florian Mayer → replaced by (Canada) Vasek Pospisil
- (Argentina) Juan Mónaco → replaced by (Luxembourg) Gilles Müller
- (France) Gaël Monfils → replaced by (Portugal) João Sousa
- (France) Benoît Paire → replaced by (United States) Donald Young

== Doubles main-draw entrants ==
=== Seeds ===
Country	Player	Country	Player	Rank^{1}	Seed
USA	Bob Bryan	USA	Mike Bryan	2	1
NED	Jean-Julien Rojer	ROU	Horia Tecău	9	2
POL	Marcin Matkowski	SRB	Nenad Zimonjić	22	3
FRA	Pierre-Hugues Herbert	FRA	Nicolas Mahut	23	4
ITA	Simone Bolelli	ITA	Fabio Fognini	31	5
RSA	Raven Klaasen	BRA	Marcelo Melo	31	6
CAN	Daniel Nestor	FRA	Édouard Roger-Vasselin	35	7
IND	Rohan Bopanna	POL	Łukasz Kubot	42	8

- Rankings are as of October 5, 2015

=== Other entrants ===
The following pairs received wildcards into the doubles main draw:

- (China) Gong Maoxin / (China) Zhang Ze
- (China) Wu Di / (China) Zhang Zhizhen

The following pair received entry as alternates:

- (Spain) Roberto Bautista Agut / (Spain) David Marrero

=== Withdrawals ===
Before the tournament

- (Spain) Fernando Verdasco (hip injury)

During the tournament

- (France) Pierre-Hugues Herbert (back injury)

== Finals ==
=== Singles ===
- (Serbia) Novak Djokovic def. (France) Jo-Wilfried Tsonga 6–2, 6–4

=== Doubles ===
- (South Africa) Raven Klaasen / (Brazil) Marcelo Melo def. (Italy) Simone Bolelli / (Italy) Fabio Fognini 6–3, 6–3
