= 2015 Davis Cup World Group play-offs =

2015 edition of the Davis Cup Group play-offs

The 2015 Davis Cup World Group play-offs were held from 18 to 20 September. The winners of the playoffs advanced to the 2016 Davis Cup World Group, and the losers were relegated to their respective Zonal Regions I.

== Teams ==
Bold indicates team qualified for the 2016 Davis Cup World Group.

From World Group

- **Germany**
- **United States**
- **Czech Republic**
- **Italy**
- Brazil
- **Croatia**
- **Japan**
- **Switzerland**

From Americas Group I

- Colombia
- Dominican Republic

From Asia/Oceania Group I

- Uzbekistan
- India

From Europe/Africa Group I

- Russia
- Netherlands
- Slovakia
- **Poland**

== Results summary ==
Date: 18–20 September

The eight losing teams in the World Group first round ties and eight winners of the Zonal Group I final round ties competed in the World Group play-offs for spots in the 2016 World Group. The draw took place on July 21 in London.

**Seeded teams**

1. Czech Republic
2. Switzerland
3. Italy
4. United States
5. Japan
6. Germany
7. Croatia
8. Slovakia

**Unseeded teams**

- Brazil
- Colombia
- Dominican Republic
- India
- Netherlands
- Poland
- Russia
- Uzbekistan

Home team	Score	Visiting team	Location	Venue	Door	Surface
India	1–3	**Czech Republic**	New Delhi	R.K. Khanna Tennis Complex	Outdoor	Hard
**Switzerland**	4–1	Netherlands	Geneva	Palexpo	Indoor	Hard
Russia	1–4	**Italy**	Irkutsk	Baikal Arena	Indoor	Hard
Uzbekistan	1–3	**United States**	Tashkent	Olympic Tennis School	Outdoor	Clay
Colombia	2–3	**Japan**	Pereira	Club Campestre	Outdoor	Clay
Dominican Republic	1–4	**Germany**	Santo Domingo Este	Centro Nacional de Tenis del Parque del Este	Outdoor	Hard
Brazil	1–3	**Croatia**	Florianópolis	Costão do Santinho	Outdoor	Clay
**Poland**	3–2	Slovakia	Gdynia	Gdynia Sports Arena	Indoor	Hard

- Croatia, Czech Republic, Germany, Italy, Japan, Switzerland and United States will remain in the World Group in 2016.
- Poland were promoted to the World Group in 2016.
- Colombia, Dominican Republic, India, Netherlands, Slovakia, Russia and Uzbekistan will remain in Zonal Group I in 2016.
- Brazil were relegated to Zonal Group I in 2016.

== Playoff results ==
=== India vs. Czech Republic ===
India
1
R.K. Khanna Tennis Complex, New Delhi, India
18–20 September 2015
Hard

Czech Republic
3

			1	2	3	4	5
1	(India) (Czech Republic)	Yuki Bhambri; **Lukáš Rosol**	2; **6**	1; **6**	5; **7**
2	(India) (Czech Republic)	**Somdev Devvarman**; Jiří Veselý	**7^{7}** 6^{3}	**6**; 4	**6**; 3
3	(India) (Czech Republic)	Rohan Bopanna / Leander Paes; **Adam Pavlásek / Radek Štěpánek**	5; **7**	2; **6**	2; **6**
4	(India) (Czech Republic)	Yuki Bhambri; **Jiří Veselý**	3; **6**	5; **7**	2; **6**
5	(India) (Czech Republic)	Somdev Devvarman; Lukáš Rosol						**not** **played**

=== Switzerland vs. Netherlands ===
Switzerland
4
Palexpo, Geneva, Switzerland
18–20 September 2015
Hard (i)

Netherlands
1

			1	2	3	4	5
1	(Switzerland) (Netherlands)	**Stan Wawrinka**; Thiemo de Bakker	2; **6**	**6**; 3	4; **6**	**6**; 3	**7**; 5
2	(Switzerland) (Netherlands)	**Roger Federer**; Jesse Huta Galung	**6**; 3	**6**; 4	**6**; 3
3	(Switzerland) (Netherlands)	Marco Chiudinelli / Roger Federer; **Thiemo de Bakker / Matwé Middelkoop**	6^{7} **7^{9}**	**6**; 4	**6**; 4	4; **6**	1; **6**
4	(Switzerland) (Netherlands)	**Roger Federer**; Thiemo de Bakker	**6**; 3	**6**; 2	**6**; 4
5	(Switzerland) (Netherlands)	**Henri Laaksonen**; Tim van Rijthoven	**7^{13}** 6^{11}	**6**; 3

=== Russia vs. Italy ===
Russia
1
Baikal-Arena, Irkutsk, Russia
18–20 September 2015
Hard (i)

Italy
4

			1	2	3	4	5
1	(Russia) (Italy)	**Teymuraz Gabashvili**; Simone Bolelli	**7^{7}** 6^{2}	**6**; 1	**6**; 3
2	(Russia) (Italy)	Andrey Rublev; **Fabio Fognini**	6^{8} **7^{10}**	2; **6**	2; **6**
3	(Russia) (Italy)	Evgeny Donskoy / Konstantin Kravchuk; **Simone Bolelli / Fabio Fognini**	5; **7**	**6**; 2	6^{5} **7^{7}**	6^{2} **7^{7}**
4	(Russia) (Italy)	Teymuraz Gabashvili; **Fabio Fognini**	6^{4} **7^{7}**	3; **6**	6^{5} **7^{7}**
5	(Russia) (Italy)	Konstantin Kravchuk; **Paolo Lorenzi**	4; **6**	6^{3} **7^{7}**

=== Uzbekistan vs. United States ===
Uzbekistan
1
Olympic Tennis School, Tashkent, Uzbekistan
18–20 September 2015
Clay

United States
3

			1	2	3	4	5
1	(Uzbekistan) (United States)	**Denis Istomin**; Steve Johnson	**6**; 1	3; **6**	**7^{7}** 6^{5}	6^{3} **7^{7}**	**7**; 5
2	(Uzbekistan) (United States)	Farrukh Dustov; **Jack Sock**	5; **7**	3; **6**	2; **6**
3	(Uzbekistan) (United States)	Farrukh Dustov / Denis Istomin; **Steve Johnson / Sam Querrey**	3; **6**	2; **6**	2; **6**
4	(Uzbekistan) (United States)	Denis Istomin; **Jack Sock**	2; **6**	**6**; 2	4; **6**	4; **6**
5	(Uzbekistan) (United States)	Farrukh Dustov; Steve Johnson						**not** **played**

=== Colombia vs. Japan ===
Colombia
2
Club Campestre, Pereira, Colombia
18–20 September 2015
Clay

Japan
3

			1	2	3	4	5
1	(Colombia) (Japan)	**Santiago Giraldo**; Taro Daniel	**6**; 4	**6**; 3	3; **6**	1; **6**	**6**; 4
2	(Colombia) (Japan)	Alejandro Falla; **Kei Nishikori**	6^{3} **7^{7}**	6^{1} **7^{7}**	5; **7**
3	(Colombia) (Japan)	**Juan Sebastián Cabal / Robert Farah**; Yoshihito Nishioka / Yasutaka Uchiyama	6^{4} **7^{7}**	**6**; 2	**6**; 3	**6**; 2
4	(Colombia) (Japan)	Santiago Giraldo; **Kei Nishikori**	4; **6**	2; **6**	6^{3} **7^{7}**
5	(Colombia) (Japan)	Alejandro Falla; **Taro Daniel**	6^{3} **7^{7}**	3; **6**	2; **6**

=== Dominican Republic vs. Germany ===
Dominican Republic
1
Centro Nacional De Tenis Parque Del Este, Santo Domingo Este, Dominican Republic
18–20 September 2015
Hard

Germany
4

			1	2	3	4	5
1	(Dominican Republic) (Germany)	**Víctor Estrella Burgos**; Dustin Brown	**6**; 4	5; **7**	**7^{7}** 6^{3}	**7^{7}** 6^{5}
2	(Dominican Republic) (Germany)	José Hernández; **Philipp Kohlschreiber**	1; **6**	3; **6**	1; **6**
3	(Dominican Republic) (Germany)	Víctor Estrella Burgos / José Hernández; **Philipp Kohlschreiber / Philipp Petzschner**	3; **6**	2; **6**	3; **6**
4	(Dominican Republic) (Germany)	Víctor Estrella Burgos; **Philipp Kohlschreiber**	4; **6**	1; **6**	2; **6**
5	(Dominican Republic) (Germany)	Roberto Cid; **Benjamin Becker**	4; **6**	6^{4} **7^{7}**

=== Brazil vs. Croatia ===
Brazil
1
Costão do Santinho, Florianópolis, Brazil
18–20 September 2015
Clay

Croatia
3

			1	2	3	4	5
1	(Brazil) (Croatia)	**Thomaz Bellucci**; Mate Delić	**6**; 1	**6**; 4	3; **6**	**6**; 4
2	(Brazil) (Croatia)	João Souza; **Borna Ćorić**	4; **6**	6^{5} **7^{7}**	1; **6**
3	(Brazil) (Croatia)	Marcelo Melo / Bruno Soares; **Ivan Dodig / Franko Škugor**	0; **6**	**6**; 3	6^{2} **7^{7}**	6^{3} **7^{7}**
4	(Brazil) (Croatia)	Thomaz Bellucci; **Borna Ćorić**	2; **6**	**6**; 4	6^{4} **7^{7}**	0; **4**		**retired**
5	(Brazil) (Croatia)	João Souza; Mate Delić						**not** **played**

=== Poland vs. Slovakia ===
Poland
3
Gdynia Sports Arena, Gdynia, Poland
18–20 September 2015
Hard (i)

Slovakia
2

			1	2	3	4	5
1	(Poland) (Slovakia)	Michał Przysiężny; **Martin Kližan**	4; **6**	4; **6**	4; **6**
2	(Poland) (Slovakia)	**Jerzy Janowicz**; Norbert Gombos	**7^{7}** 6^{1}	**6**; 4	6^{5} **7^{7}**	**6**; 2
3	(Poland) (Slovakia)	**Łukasz Kubot / Marcin Matkowski**; Andrej Martin / Igor Zelenay	**6**; 3	**6**; 4	**6**; 4
4	(Poland) (Slovakia)	Jerzy Janowicz; **Martin Kližan**	3; **6**	6^{4} **7^{7}**	3; **6**
5	(Poland) (Slovakia)	**Michał Przysiężny**; Norbert Gombos	**6**; 3	**6**; 4	**6**; 4
