= 2015 BNP Paribas Masters =

- Date: 31 October – 8 November
- Edition: 43rd
- Category: ATP World Tour Masters 1000
- Draw: 48S / 24D
- Prize money: €3,288,530
- Surface: Hard / indoor
- Location: Paris, France
- Venue: Palais omnisports de Paris-Bercy

Champions

Singles
- (Serbia) Novak Djokovic

Doubles
- (Croatia) Ivan Dodig / (Brazil) Marcelo Melo
← 2014 ·	Paris Masters	· 2016 →

The 2015 BNP Paribas Masters was a professional men's tennis tournament that was played on indoor hard courts. It was the 43rd edition of the tournament, and part of the World Tour Masters 1000 category of the 2015 ATP World Tour. It took take place at the Palais omnisports de Paris-Bercy in Paris, France, between 31 October and 8 November 2015. First-seeded Novak Djokovic won the singles title.

== Points and prize money ==
=== Point distribution ===
Event	W	F	SF	QF	Round of 16	Round of 32	Round of 64	Q	Q2	Q1
Singles	1000	600	360	180	90	45	10	25	16	0
Doubles	1000	600	360	180	90	0	—	—	—	—

=== Prize money ===
Event	W	F	SF	QF	Round of 16	Round of 32	Round of 64	Q2	Q1
Singles	€653,700	€320,500	€161,320	€82,030	€42,600	€22,460	€12,125	€2,685	€1,370
Doubles	€194,500	€95,230	€47,770	€24,520	€12,670	€6,690	—	—	—

== Singles main-draw entrants ==
=== Seeds ===
Country	Player	Rank^{1}	Seed
SRB	Novak Djokovic	1	1
GBR	Andy Murray	2	2
SUI	Roger Federer	3	3
SUI	Stan Wawrinka	4	4
CZE	Tomáš Berdych	5	5
JPN	Kei Nishikori	6	6
ESP	Rafael Nadal	7	7
ESP	David Ferrer	8	8
FRA	Jo-Wilfried Tsonga	10	9
FRA	Richard Gasquet	11	10
RSA	Kevin Anderson	12	11
CRO	Marin Čilić	13	12
USA	John Isner	14	13
FRA	Gilles Simon	15	14
ESP	Feliciano López	16	15
BEL	David Goffin	17	16

- ^{1} Rankings are as of 26 October 2015

=== Other entrants ===
The following players received wildcards into the singles main draw:

- (France) Pierre-Hugues Herbert
- (France) Nicolas Mahut
- (France) Lucas Pouille

The following players received entry from the qualifying draw:

- (United Kingdom) Aljaž Bedene
- (Spain) Pablo Carreño Busta
- (Spain) Marcel Granollers
- (Serbia) Dušan Lajović
- (France) Édouard Roger-Vasselin
- (Czech Republic) Lukáš Rosol

The following player received entry as a lucky loser:

- (Russia) Teymuraz Gabashvili

=== Withdrawals ===
Before the tournament

- (Germany) Philipp Kohlschreiber → replaced by (Russia) Teymuraz Gabashvili
- (Canada) Milos Raonic → replaced by (Czech Republic) Jiří Veselý
- (Spain) Tommy Robredo → replaced by (France) Adrian Mannarino

=== Retirements ===
- (Japan) Kei Nishikori (side abdominal injury)

== Doubles main-draw entrants ==
=== Seeds ===
Country	Player	Country	Player	Rank^{1}	Seed
USA	Bob Bryan	USA	Mike Bryan	2	1
CRO	Ivan Dodig	BRA	Marcelo Melo	9	2
NED	Jean-Julien Rojer	ROU	Horia Tecău	9	3
GBR	Jamie Murray	AUS	John Peers	15	4
FRA	Pierre-Hugues Herbert	FRA	Nicolas Mahut	21	5
~~ITA~~	~~Simone Bolelli~~	~~ITA~~	~~Fabio Fognini~~]	~~21~~	~~6~~
POL	Marcin Matkowski	SRB	Nenad Zimonjić	28	7
IND	Rohan Bopanna	ROU	Florin Mergea	30	8

- Rankings are as of 26 October 2015

=== Other entrants ===
The following pairs received wildcards into the doubles main draw:

- (France) Fabrice Martin / (France) Lucas Pouille
- (France) Paul-Henri Mathieu / (France) Benoît Paire

The following pair received entry as alternates:

- (Uruguay) Pablo Cuevas / (Spain) Marcel Granollers

=== Withdrawals ===
Before the tournament

- (Italy) Fabio Fognini (ankle injury)

== Finals ==
=== Singles ===
- (Serbia) Novak Djokovic defeated (United Kingdom) Andy Murray, 6–2, 6–4

=== Doubles ===
- (Croatia) Ivan Dodig / (Brazil) Marcelo Melo defeated (Canada) Vasek Pospisil / (United States) Jack Sock, 2–6, 6–3, [10–5]
