= 2015 Monte-Carlo Rolex Masters =

- Date: 12–19 April
- Edition: 109th
- Category: Masters 1000
- Draw: 56S / 24D
- Prize money: €3,288,530
- Surface: Clay
- Location: Roquebrune-Cap-Martin, France (billed as Monte Carlo, Monaco)
- Venue: Monte Carlo Country Club

Champions

Singles
- (Serbia) Novak Djokovic

Doubles
- (United States) Bob Bryan / (United States) Mike Bryan
← 2014 ·	Monte-Carlo Masters	· 2016 →

The 2015 Monte-Carlo Rolex Masters was a tennis tournament for male professional players, played from 12 April through 19 April 2015, on outdoor clay courts. It was the 109th edition of the annual Monte Carlo Masters tournament, which was sponsored by Rolex for the seventh time. It took place at the Monte Carlo Country Club in Roquebrune-Cap-Martin, France (though billed as Monte Carlo, Monaco).

== Finals ==
=== Singles ===
- (Serbia) Novak Djokovic defeated (Czech Republic) Tomáš Berdych, 7–5, 4–6, 6–3

=== Doubles ===
- (United States) Bob Bryan / (United States) Mike Bryan defeated (Italy) Simone Bolelli / (Italy) Fabio Fognini, 7–6^{(7–3)}, 6–1

== Points and prize money ==
=== Points distribution ===
Because the Monte Carlo Masters is the non-mandatory Masters 1000 event, special rules regarding points distribution are in place. The Monte Carlo Masters counts as one of a player's 500 level tournaments, while distributing Masters 1000 points.

Event	W	F	SF	QF	Round of 16	Round of 32	Round of 64	Q	Q2	Q1
Singles	1,000	600	360	180	90	45	10	25	16	0
Doubles	1,000	600	360	180	90	45	0	—	—	—

=== Prize money ===
The total prize money pot for the 2015 competition is €3,288,530, distributed throughout both competitions.

== Singles main-draw entrants ==
=== Seeds ===
Country	Player	Rank	Seed
SRB	Novak Djokovic	1	1
SUI	Roger Federer	2	2
ESP	Rafael Nadal	5	3
CAN	Milos Raonic	6	4
ESP	David Ferrer	7	5
CZE	Tomáš Berdych	8	6
SUI	Stan Wawrinka	9	7
CRO	Marin Čilić	10	8
BUL	Grigor Dimitrov	11	9
FRA	Gilles Simon	13	10
FRA	Jo-Wilfried Tsonga	14	11
ESP	Roberto Bautista Agut	15	12
LAT	Ernests Gulbis	17	13
FRA	Gaël Monfils	18	14
USA	John Isner	19	15
ESP	Tommy Robredo	20	16

- Rankings are as of April 6, 2015

=== Other entrants ===
The following players received wildcards into the main draw:

- (Monaco) Benjamin Balleret
- (France) Gaël Monfils
- (France) Lucas Pouille
- (Russia) Mikhail Youzhny

The following players used a protected ranking to gain entry into the main draw:

- (Germany) Florian Mayer

The following players received entry from the qualifying draw:

- (Slovakia) Norbert Gombos
- (United States) Denis Kudla
- (Russia) Andrey Kuznetsov
- (France) Benoît Paire
- (Spain) Albert Ramos Viñolas
- (France) Édouard Roger-Vasselin
- (Argentina) Diego Schwartzman

The following players received entry as lucky losers:

- (Netherlands) Robin Haase
- (Germany) Jan-Lennard Struff

=== Withdrawals ===
Before the tournament

- (Spain) Nicolás Almagro →replaced by Robin Haase
- (France) Julien Benneteau →replaced by Víctor Estrella Burgos
- (Uruguay) Pablo Cuevas →replaced by Borna Ćorić
- (France) Richard Gasquet →replaced by Andreas Haider-Maurer
- (Australia) Nick Kyrgios →replaced by Pablo Carreño Busta
- (United States) Sam Querrey →replaced by Jan-Lennard Struff

=== Retirements ===
- (Dominican Republic) Víctor Estrella Burgos
- (Canada) Milos Raonic (right foot injury)

== Doubles main-draw entrants ==
=== Seeds ===
Country	Player	Country	Player	Rank	Seed
USA	Bob Bryan	USA	Mike Bryan	2	1
CRO	Ivan Dodig	BRA	Marcelo Melo	9	2
NED	Jean-Julien Rojer	ROU	Horia Tecău	22	3
POL	Marcin Matkowski	SRB	Nenad Zimonjić	25	4
ESP	Marcel Granollers	ESP	Marc López	27	5
CAN	Daniel Nestor	IND	Leander Paes	30	6
AUT	Alexander Peya	BRA	Bruno Soares	31	7
FRA	Nicolas Mahut	FRA	Édouard Roger-Vasselin	32	8

- Rankings are as of April 6, 2015

=== Other entrants ===
The following pairs received wildcards into the doubles main draw:

- (Monaco) Romain Arneodo / (Monaco) Benjamin Balleret
- (France) Benoît Paire / (Switzerland) Stan Wawrinka

The following pair received entry as alternates:

- (Netherlands) Robin Haase / (South Africa) Raven Klaasen
- (Italy) Andreas Seppi / (Ukraine) Sergiy Stakhovsky

=== Withdrawals ===
Before the tournament

- (Spain) Nicolás Almagro (ankle injury)
- (Latvia) Ernests Gulbis (stomach illness)

=== Retirements ===
- (Italy) Andreas Seppi (hip injury)
