= 2015 Andy Murray tennis season =

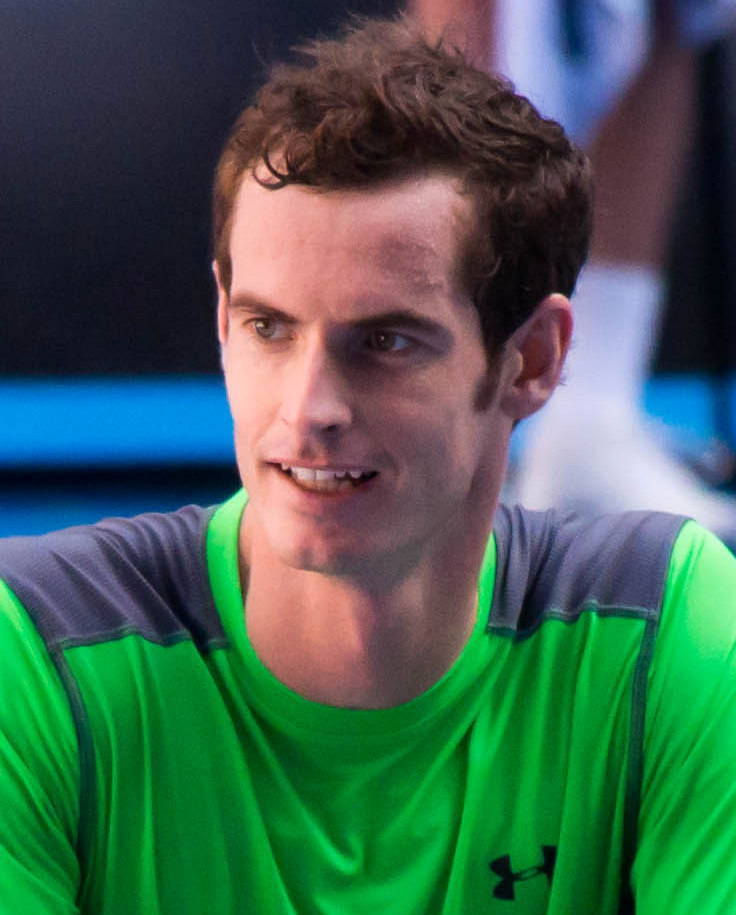
- Murray at the 2015 Australian Open
- Full name: Andrew Barron Murray
- Country: United Kingdom

Singles
- Season record: 71–14
- Calendar titles: 4
- Year-end ranking: No. 2
- Ranking change from previous year: ▲4

Grand Slam & significant results
- Australian Open: F
- French Open: SF
- Wimbledon: SF
- US Open: 4R
- Other tournaments
- Tour Finals: RR

Doubles
- Season record: 7–6
- Calendar titles: 0
- Current ranking: No. 149
- Ranking change from previous year: ▲187

Davis Cup
- Davis Cup: W
- Last updated on: 28 November 2015.

The 2015 Andy Murray tennis season began at the Australian Open. Murray was the defending champion at the Shenzhen, Vienna and Valencia Opens, but chose not to defend these titles. His season saw him reach seven singles finals, winning titles at Munich, Madrid, Queen's and Montreal, while he won eight singles and three doubles rubbers to help lead Great Britain to the Davis Cup title for the first time in 79 years.

== Year in Detail ==
=== Australian Open Series and early hard-court season ===
==== Hopman Cup ====
At the beginning of the year Murray teamed up with Heather Watson in the Hopman Cup, where in the group stage they having won fewer sets and games than Poland, finishing second in their group. Murray and Watson lost the doubles match against Poland, however Murray went undefeated in singles, beating Benoît Paire, Jerzy Janowicz and Marinko Matosevic, each in straight sets.

==== Australian Open ====
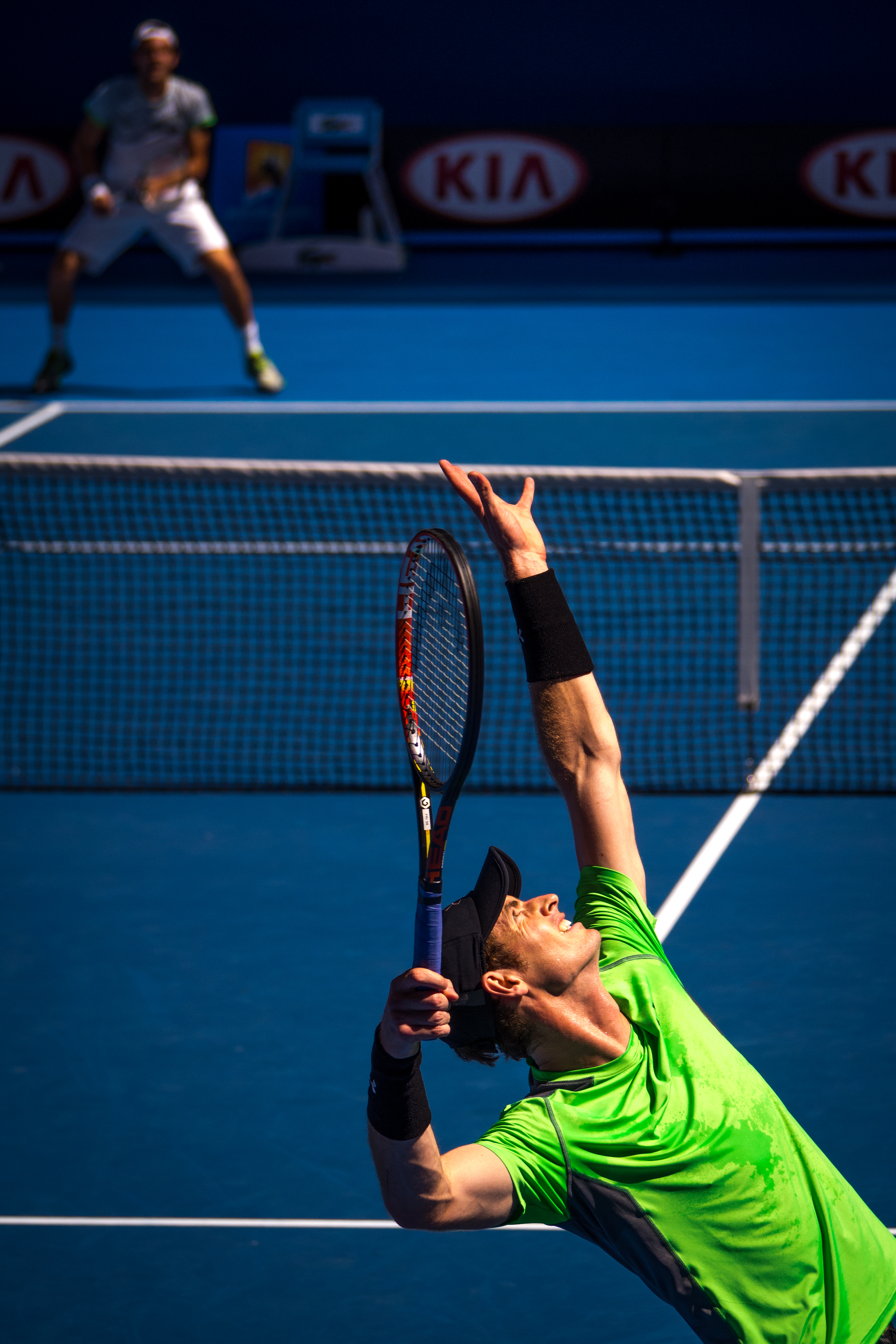
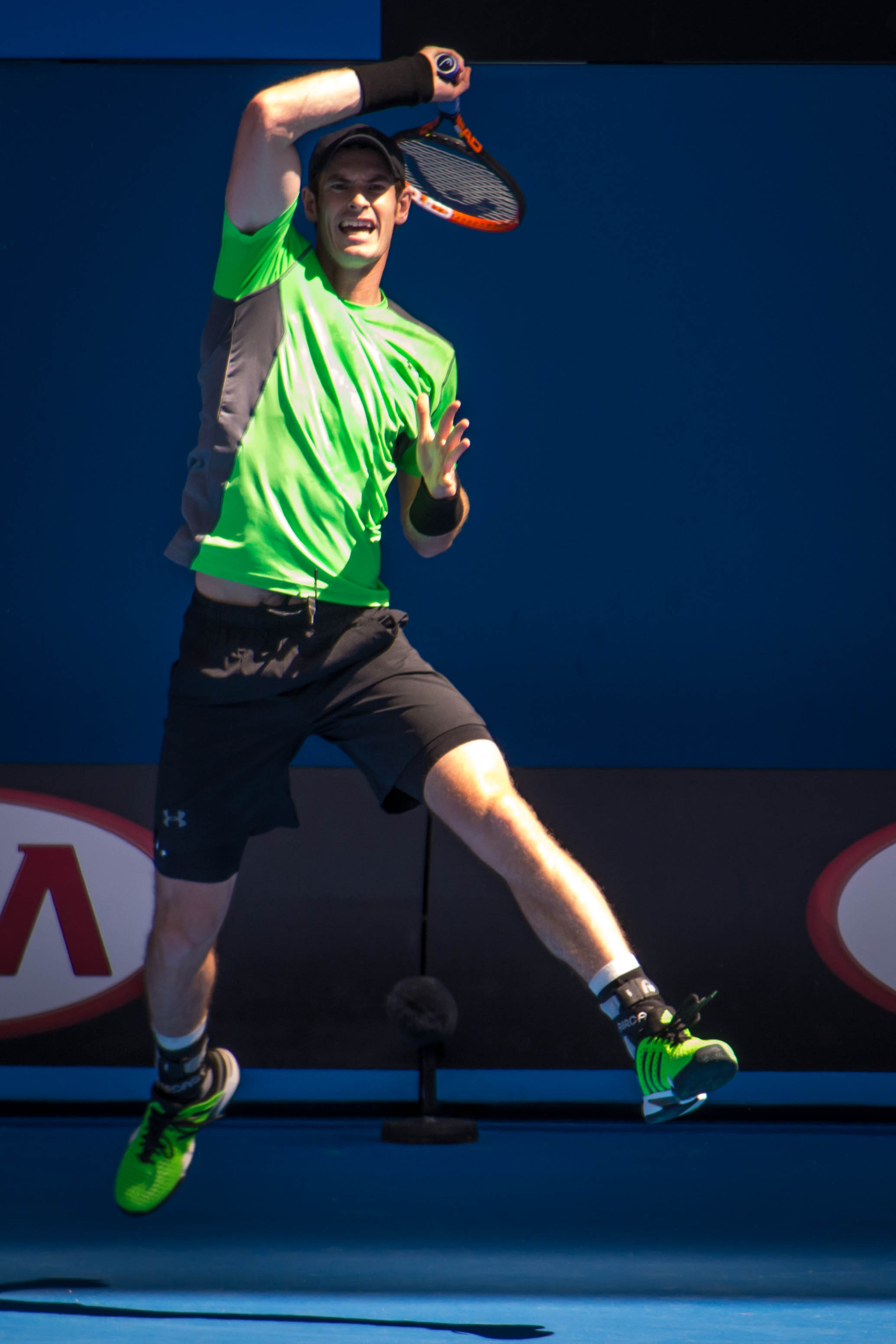
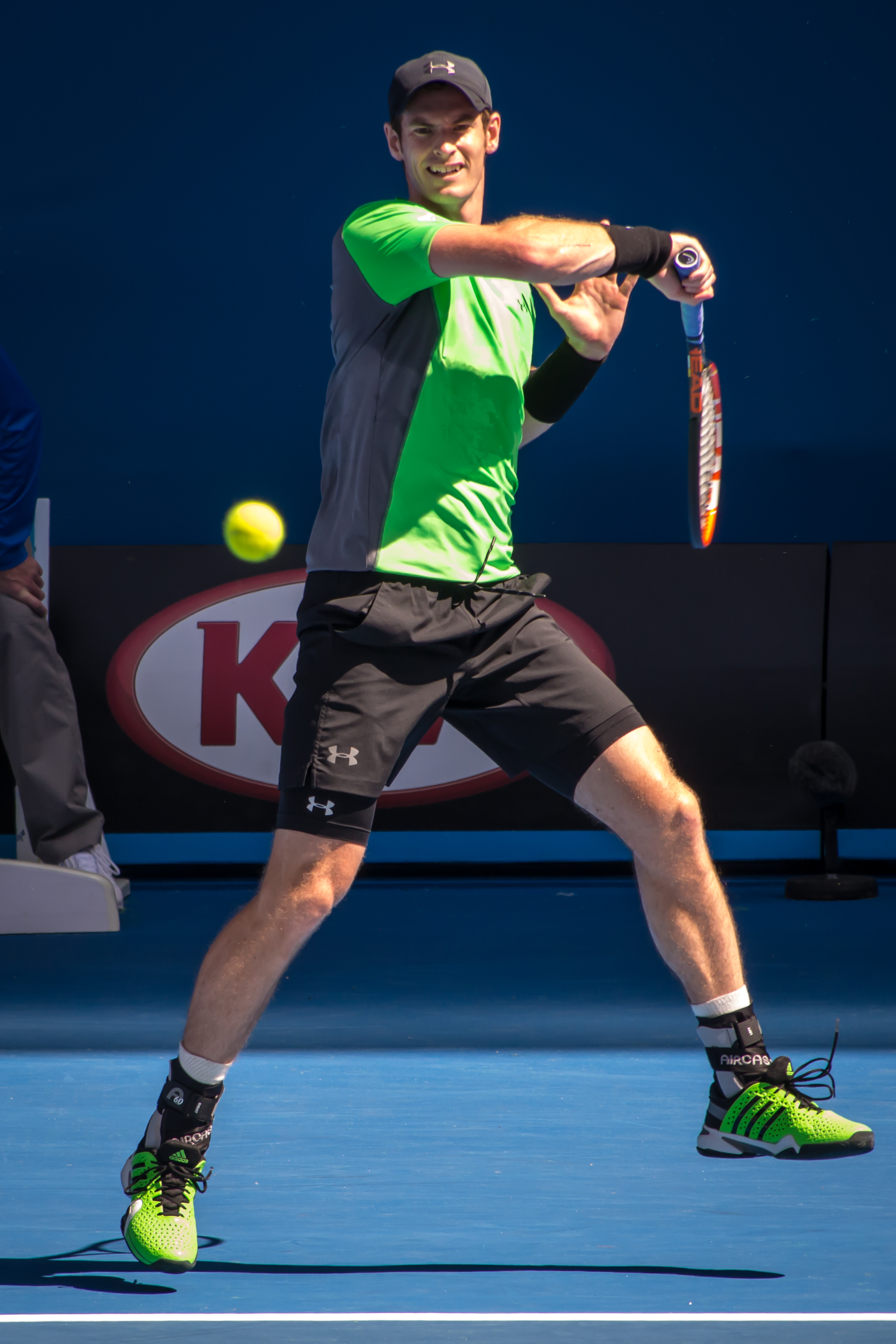
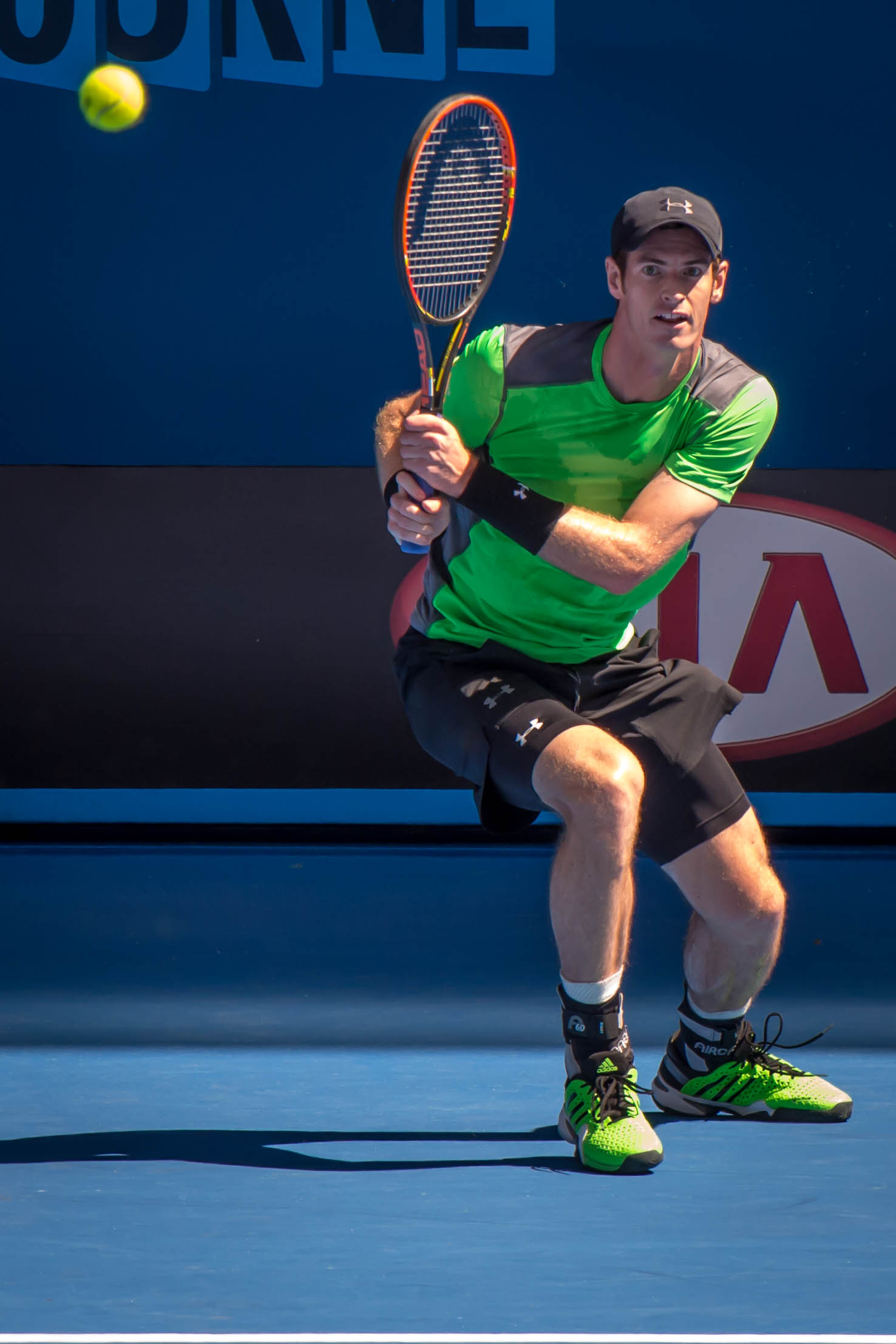
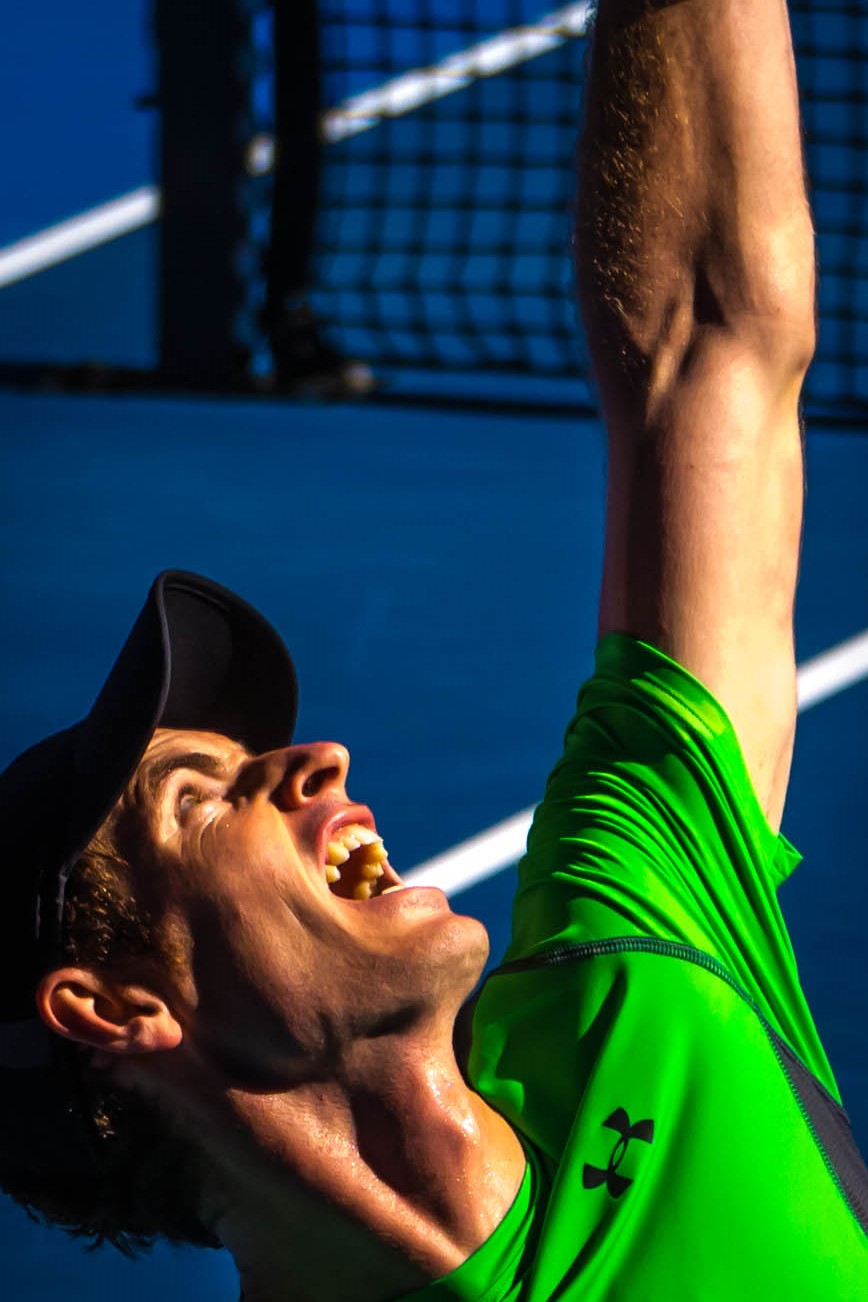
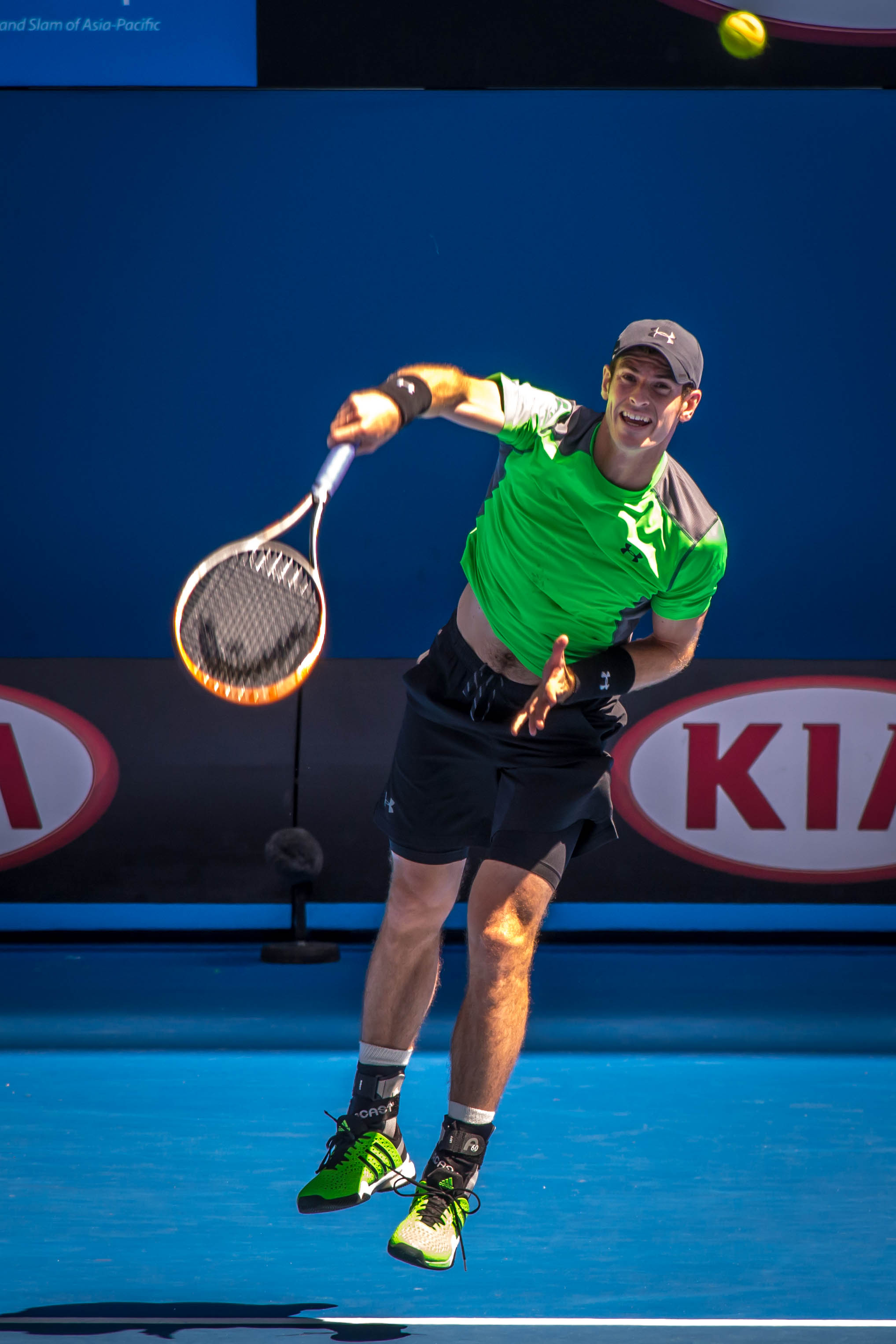
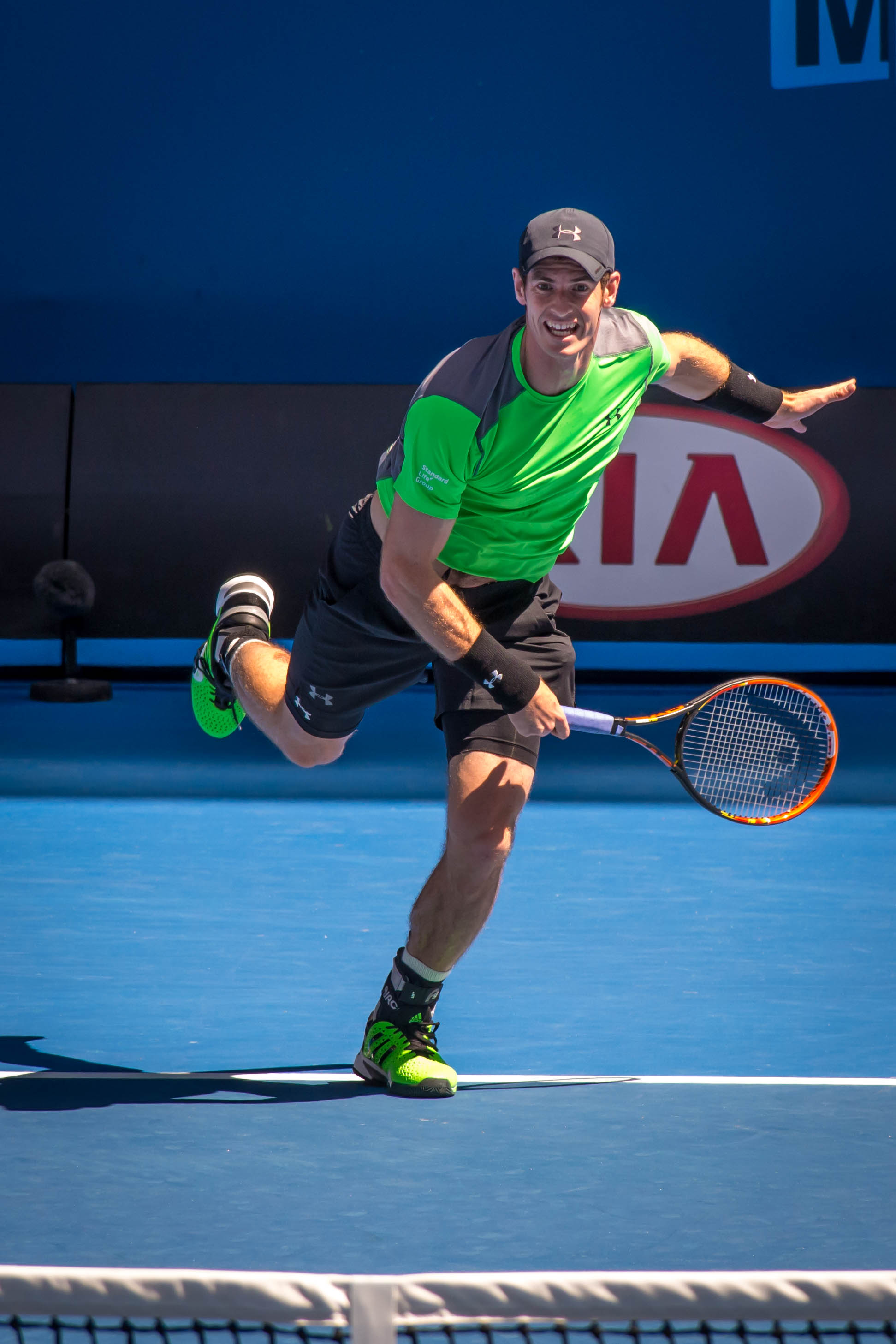
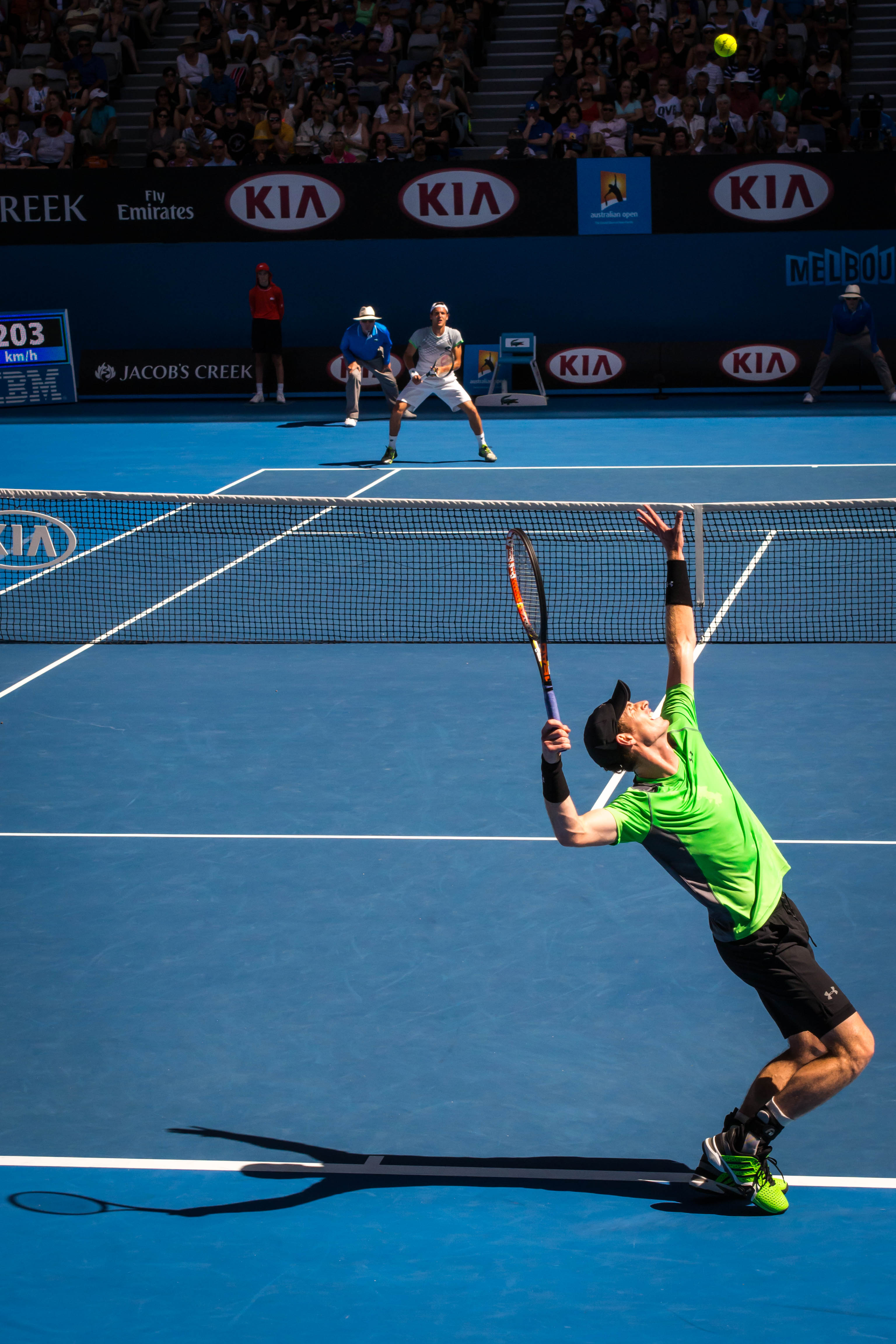
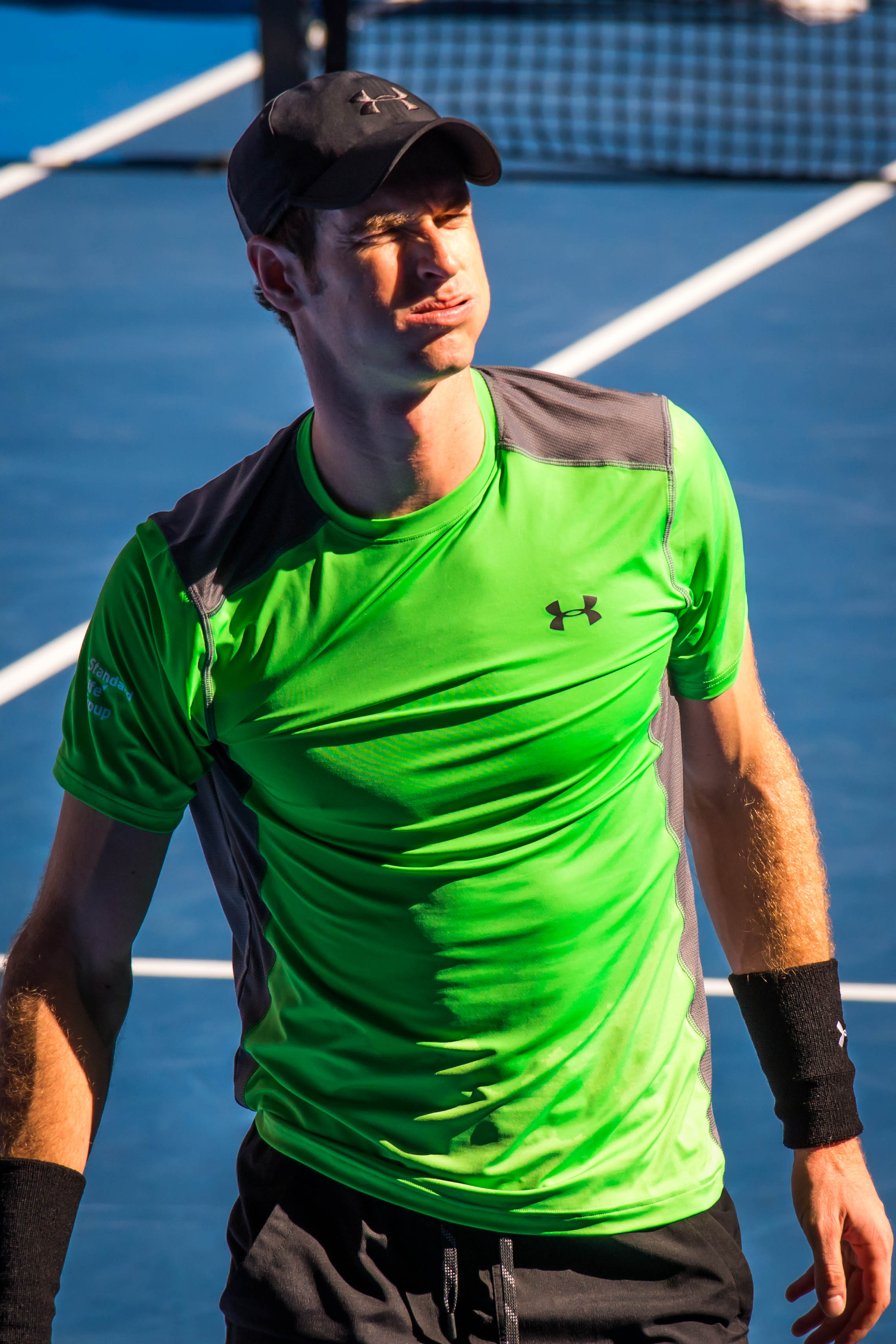
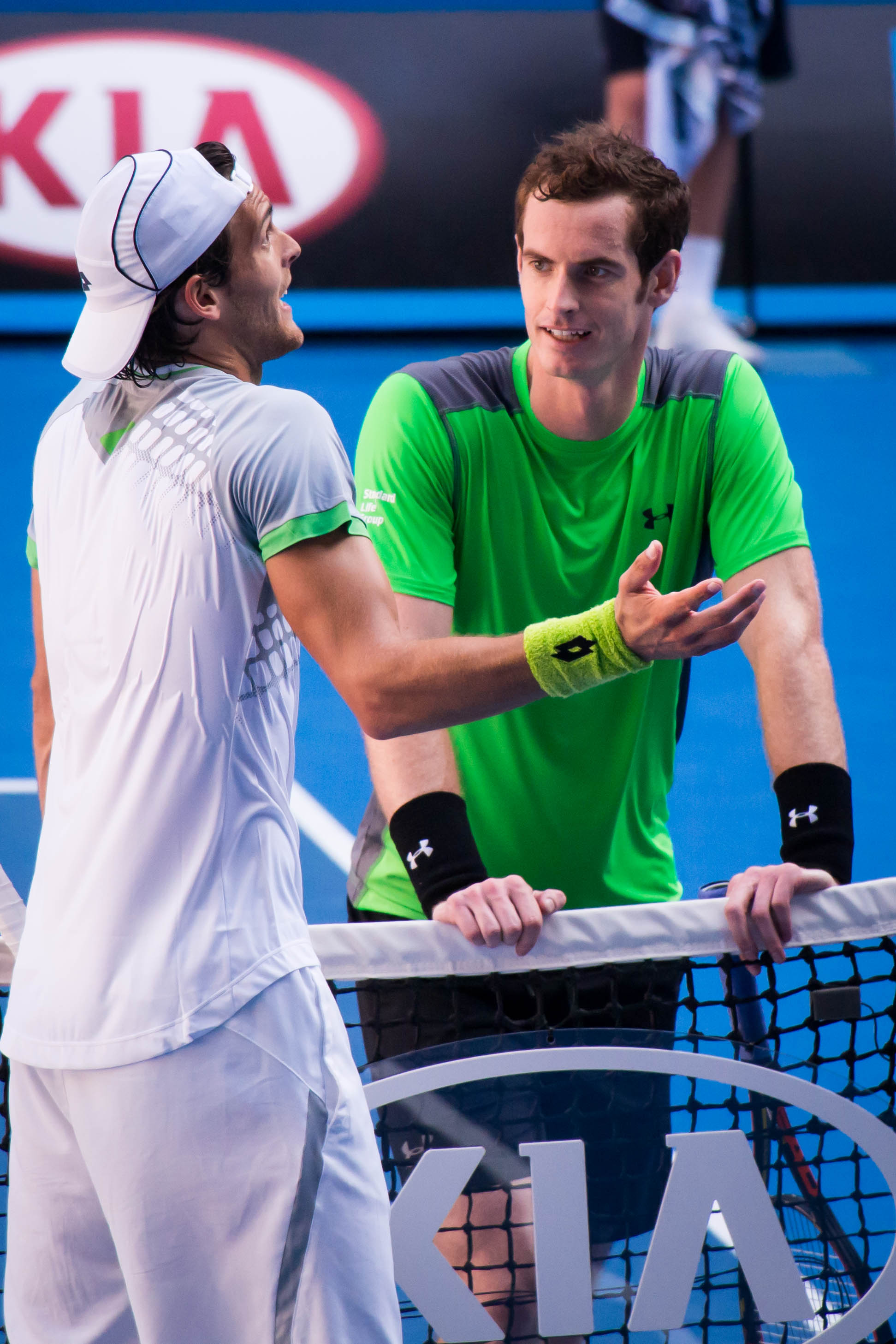
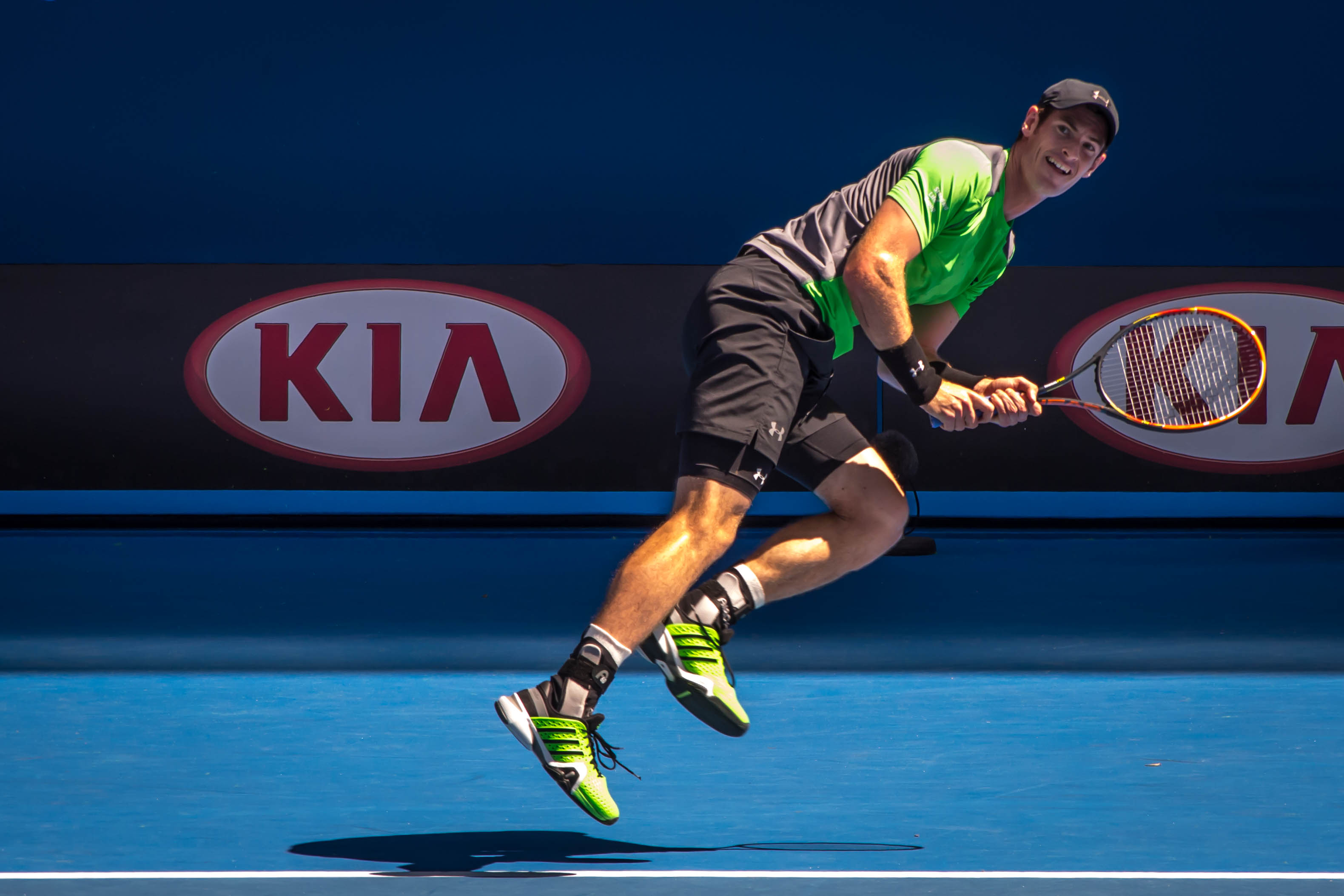
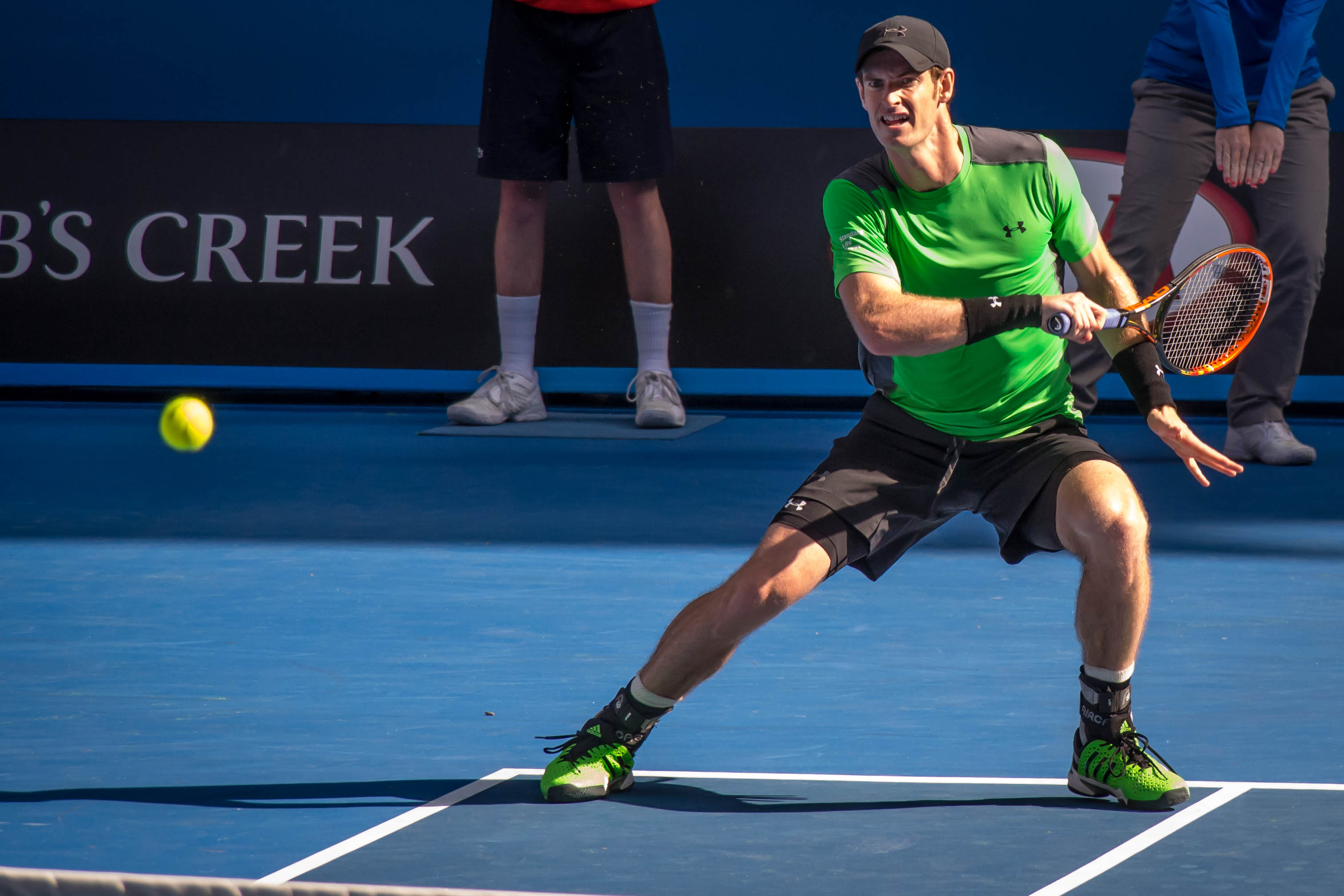
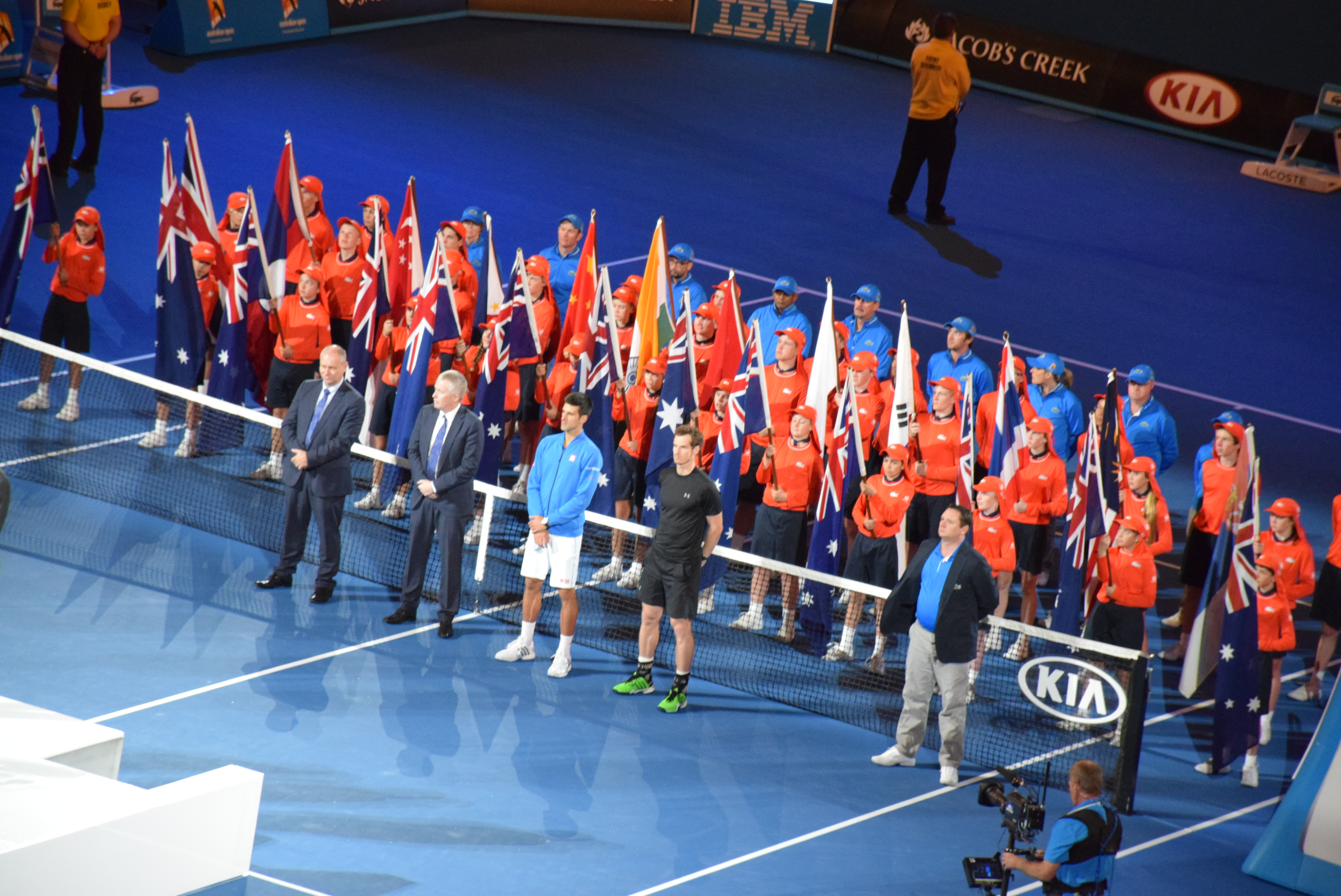
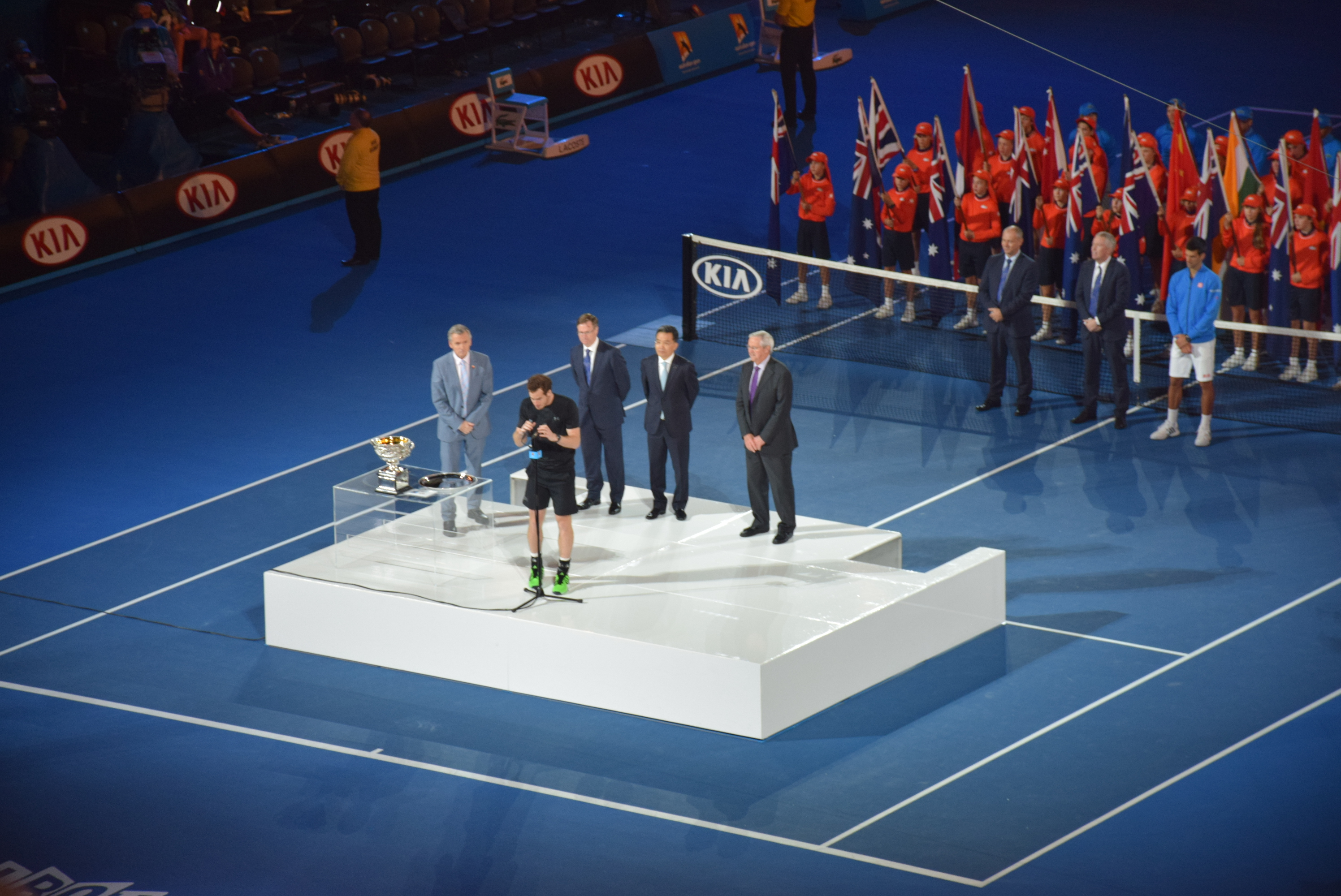

Murray entered the first Grand Slam event of the year as the 6th seed, and began strongly as he defeated qualifier Yuki Bhambri, Australian Marinko Matosevic and João Sousa of Portugal without dropping a set. He followed this up by defeating 10th seed Grigor Dimitrov in four tightly contested sets, despite his opponent having served for the fourth set at 5–3; Murray won the last five games to seal the win, and make it through to the quarterfinals in Melbourne for the sixth straight year. In the quarterfinals, the Scot faced teenage sensation and home favourite Nick Kyrgios, in the Australian's second Grand slam quarterfinal in as many appearances. Murray made light work of his young opponent, and despite being broken towards the end of the third set, Murray made it through in straight sets to his 15th Grand Slam semifinal. He faced Tomáš Berdych for the first time since 2013, going into the match with a 4–6 disadvantage in their head-to-head. Despite losing the first set, Murray then dominated proceedings, taking the second set to love and ultimately winning in four sets to make it through to his fourth final at the Australian Open, his eighth career Grand Slam final appearance. Here he faced Novak Djokovic for his first Australian open title. However, he lost in four sets, which would be his fifth consecutive defeat to the Serb.

==== Rotterdam Open ====
Murray entered the Rotterdam Open as the first seed and won both his opening matches in straight sets against Nicolas Mahut and Vasek Pospisil. However, he lost at the quarterfinal stage in straight sets to Gilles Simon, who ended a 12 match losing streak to Murray.

==== Dubai Tennis Championships ====
Murray won his opening match in straight sets against Gilles Müller, then thrashed João Sousa for the loss of just two games to reach the quarterfinals. However, he got thrashed in the quarterfinal stage to Croatian teenager Borna Ćorić, winning just four games.

==== Davis Cup World Group First Round ====
Murray next played in the Davis Cup World Group First Round in Glasgow. He won his first match in four sets against Donald Young and then defeated John Isner in straight sets, despite Isner having set points in the first set. Those two victories, along with a five set marathon win by James Ward over Isner, allowed Great Britain to progress to the quarterfinals for the second consecutive time with a 3–2 lead over the United States.

==== Indian Wells ====
Murray beat Vasek Pospisil in straight sets, then defeated Philipp Kohlschreiber in three sets. He then won his next two matches in straight sets against Adrian Mannarino and Feliciano López (overtaking Tim Henman's record of 496 career wins to have the most career wins in the Open Era for a British man) but lost in the semifinal stage to Djokovic in straight sets.

Murray also participated in the doubles alongside Thanasi Kokkinakis and they both won their opening match against the fourth seeds Jean-Julien Rojer and Horia Tecău but lost their next match against Marcin Matkowski and Nenad Zimonjić.

==== Miami Open ====
Murray again faced Donald Young in his opening match and defeated him in straight sets before beating Santiago Giraldo in straight sets to avenge his defeat in the 2014 Madrid Open. He then defeated Kevin Anderson in three sets to record his 500th career win in the ATP World Tour, becoming the first British man in the Open Era to do so. He then reached the final after defeating Dominic Thiem in three sets and Tomáš Berdych in straight sets. He then lost the final to Djokovic in three sets (who won a record fifth Miami title) and was again broken to love in the third and deciding set, having received a bagel during his defeat to Djokovic in the Australian Open final.

=== Spring Clay Court season and French Open ===
==== Bavarian International Tennis Championships ====
Murray did not participate in the Monte-Carlo Masters due to his marriage to his longtime girlfriend Kim Sears, so he began his Clay Court season in the Bavarian International Tennis Championships at Munich. He defeated Mischa Zverev in straight sets and then reached his first ever Clay Court final after defeating Lukáš Rosol in three sets and Roberto Bautista Agut in straight sets, completing both matches in a single day after his match with Rosol was suspended by rain in the previous day. He then won his first title on Clay by defeating Philipp Kohlschreiber in three sets, requiring tiebreakers to win both the first and third sets. This made him the first British player to win a tour level Clay Court title since Buster Mottram in 1976.

Murray paired up with Jean-Julien Rojer in the doubles and they both upset the third seeds Lukáš Rosol and Raven Klaasen and then beat Rameez Junaid and Adil Shamasdin to reach the semifinals where they lost to the top seeds Alexander Peya and Bruno Soares, in what was Murray's third match of the day after his singles victories over Rosol and Bautista Agut.

==== Madrid Open ====
He then took his newfound form on Clay to the Madrid Open, beating Kohlschreiber again in three sets in his opening match after breaking to love in the third set during an early morning match finishing at 3:00am. He then thrashed Marcel Granollers in straight sets, losing only two games, and then beat Milos Raonic (who was struggling with a foot injury) and Kei Nishikori both in straight sets to face Rafael Nadal in the final. He won his second straight Clay court title and his first Masters 1000 title on Clay by defeating Nadal in straight sets, his first victory over Nadal since the 2011 Japan Open and his first victory against Nadal on Clay after six previous defeats. By winning, he became only the fourth player to defeat Nadal in a clay court final, following Roger Federer, Djokovic and Horacio Zeballos.

==== Rome Masters ====
Murray beat Jérémy Chardy in straight sets but withdrew due to fatigue from the tournament before his next match against David Goffin, after playing nine matches in the space of ten days and his early morning match against Kohlschreiber in the Madrid Open.

==== French Open ====
Murray then entered the French Open with a 10 match winning streak on Clay, extending that streak by beating Facundo Argüello in straight sets and João Sousa in four sets in his opening round matches. He next defeated Nick Kyrgios again in straight sets and then beat Jerémy Chardy and David Ferrer both in four sets to reach his third semifinal in the French Open. He faced Djokovic again and lost the first two sets, but won the next two sets to take the match into a deciding set during a two-day match delayed by a thunderstorm. However, he ultimately lost the match in five sets, putting an end to his 15 match winning streak on Clay.

=== Grass Court season and Wimbledon ===
==== Queens Club Championships ====
Murray began his grass court season at Queen's Club. He won his first two matches in straight sets against Lu Yen-hsun and Fernando Verdasco before defeating Gilles Müller in three sets to reach the semifinals. Murray went on to win his 34th career title by defeating Victor Troicki and Kevin Anderson in straight sets both in a single day after his match with Troicki was suspended by rain. This was his fourth Queen's Club title, equalling the number of titles which John McEnroe, Boris Becker, Lleyton Hewitt and Andy Roddick had won in the Open Era.

In the doubles, Murray paired up with Dominic Inglot but they both lost in the first round to Alexander Peya and Bruno Soares.

==== Wimbledon Championships ====
Murray drew Kazakh Mikhail Kukushkin in the opening round of the Wimbledon Championships. He won in straight sets, and also defeated Robin Haase in straight sets to reach the third round, where he played Andreas Seppi. Murray went two sets up but then lost six games in a row after Seppi had taken an injury timeout, before Murray had shoulder treatment and came back to win the final six games and the match.

Murray reached the quarter-finals after a four-set victory over Ivo Karlović, and there beat Vasek Pospisil in straight sets to reach his sixth Wimbledon semi-final and set up a match against Roger Federer. However, after missing a break point opportunity against the Federer serve in the first game, Federer never faced another break point and managed to break Murray at the end of each set to win 7–5, 7–5, 6–4.

==== Davis Cup World Group Quarterfinals ====
With the Davis Cup Quarterfinals taking place at the Queen's Club, Murray won his first match against Jo-Wilfried Tsonga in straight sets. He then paired up with his elder brother and doubles specialist Jamie Murray in the doubles against Tsonga and Nicolas Mahut and despite losing the first set along with Murray sustaining a fall during the match, the two brothers eventually won the match in four sets. He then faced Gilles Simon in his next singles match and after initially being a set and a break down, he suddenly found his form again towards the end of the second set and eventually won in four sets, winning 12 of the last 15 games in the process (with Simon struggling from an ankle injury). With a 3–1 lead over France, this resulted in Great Britain reaching their first Davis Cup semifinal since 1981.

=== US Open Series ===
==== Washington Open ====
Murray was the top seed in the tournament and drew Teymuraz Gabashvili in the second round. Both players split the first two sets with Gabashvili winning the first set and Murray winning the second set. However, despite serving for the match at 5–4 in the third set, Murray was broken back and lost the match in three sets after a deciding tiebreaker. Murray also paired up with Daniel Nester in the doubles but they lost in the first round to the third seeds Rohan Bopanna and Florin Mergea in three sets.

==== Canadian Open ====
Murray responded well from his shock defeat in the Washington Open by defeating Tommy Robredo in straight sets despite Robredo being a break up in the second set. This was then followed by straight sets victories over Gilles Müller in the third round and the defending champion Jo-Wilfried Tsonga (who had defeated Murray in the same stage the previous year en route to claiming the title) in the quarterfinals. He then faced Kei Nishikori again in the semifinals but despite the first set having three breaks in a row, Murray won the second set comfortably with a bagel, winning 12 of the last 13 points in the process, advancing to the final without dropping a set. This therefore ensured that he would overtake Roger Federer as the world number 2, returning to that ranking for the first time since 2013. He faced Djokovic again and both players split the opening two sets after three breaks of serve in each set, with Murray winning the first set and Djokovic taking the second set. Murray then broke for an early lead in the third set and despite saving 6 break points along with Djokovic saving 5 match points, Murray won the match in three sets, ending an eight-match losing streak against the world number 1. This was Murray's first victory over Djokovic since his Wimbledon victory in 2013, and the first time he had defeated Djokovic in the deciding set of a three-set match.

In the doubles, Murray paired up with 16-time doubles Grand Slam champion Leander Paes, and they beat Kevin Anderson and Jérémy Chardy in straight sets to set up a meeting with John Peers and Murray's elder brother Jamie Murray, marking the first time the two brothers had faced against each other in a professional match. However, despite having set points in the second-set tiebreaker, the elder Murray and Peers won the match in straight sets.

==== Cincinnati Masters ====
In the second Master Series tournament of the US Hard Court season, Murray defeated Mardy Fish in the second round, and then beat both Grigor Dimitrov and Richard Gasquet in three-set matches, having to come from a set down on both occasions, while Dimitrov had served for the match in the deciding set. In the semi-final he lost to defending champion Roger Federer in straight sets, and after Federer went on to win the tournament this result saw Murray drop back to number 3 in the rankings.

==== US Open ====
Murray drew Nick Kyrgios in the first round and while he won the first two sets, Kyrgios won the third set, his first against Murray having lost their last three meetings in straight sets, before losing in four sets. Murray then faced Adrian Mannarino in the second round and unexpectedly dropped the first two sets before finding his form and winning the next three sets to prevail in five sets, matching Roger Federer for winning 8 matches from 2 sets down. Murray then beat Thomaz Bellucci in straight sets, dropping his serve only once in the match, to face Kevin Anderson in the fourth round. However, while Murray easily won their last meeting in the Queens Club final, Anderson's serve this time proved too much for Murray as he took the first set in a tiebreaker and then broke Murray in the second set for a two set to love lead. While Murray battled back to take the third set in a tiebreaker, Anderson won the match in four sets to reach his first Grand Slam quarterfinal without dropping a point in the last tiebreaker. This ended Murray's five-year run of 18 consecutive Grand Slam Quarterfinals (not counting his withdrawal from the 2013 French Open) since his third round loss to Stan Wawrinka in the 2010 US Open.

=== Davis Cup and End of Season ===
==== Davis Cup World Group Semifinals ====
Playing against Australia in the semifinals of the Davis Cup World Group in Glasgow, Andy Murray won both his singles rubbers in straight sets, against Thanasi Kokkinakis and Bernard Tomic. He also partnered his brother Jamie, and they won in five sets against the pairing of Sam Groth and Lleyton Hewitt, the results guiding Great Britain to the Davis Cup final for the first time since 1978.

==== Shanghai Masters ====
Andy Murray reached the semifinals after victories against Steve Johnson and John Isner, before defeating Tomáš Berdych in straight sets including a run of nine games in a row. In the semifinals he lost to Novak Djokovic for the fifth time in the season, but the result along with Federer's early exit from the tournament ensured that Murray returned to the No. 2 ranking.

==== Paris Masters ====
Murray reached the quarter-finals for the loss of just four games, with victories against Borna Ćorić and David Goffin, before defeating Richard Gasquet in three sets to reach his first semi-final at the Paris Masters, becoming only the fourth person to reach the semi-finals or better at least once at all nine Masters tournaments. He then beat David Ferrer in straight sets, including a run of the last five games, but lost to Novak Djokovic in the final for the sixth time in the season.

==== ATP World Tour Finals ====
Murray had qualified for the Tour Finals and was seeded second, drawn in the same group as Stanislas Wawrinka, Rafael Nadal and David Ferrer. He beat Ferrer in his opening match, but lost both his other matches and was eliminated from the tournament at the group stage. However, Roger Federer lost in the final, ensuring that Murray finished the year as World No. 2 for the first time in his career.

==== Davis Cup World Group Final ====
After Kyle Edmund had lost the first singles rubber, Murray's victory over Ruben Bemelmans in straight sets pulled Great Britain level in the final, played on indoor clay courts at Ghent. He then partnered his brother Jamie in a four-set victory over the pairing of Steve Darcis and David Goffin, before defeating Goffin again in the reverse singles on Sunday, thus ensuring a 3-1 victory for Great Britain, their first Davis Cup title since 1936. Murray also became only the third person since the current Davis Cup format was introduced to win all eight of his singles rubbers in a Davis Cup season, after John McEnroe and Mats Wilander.

== All matches ==
Key
W	F	SF	QF	#R	RR	Q#	P#	DNQ	A	Z#	PO	G	S	B	NMS	NTI	P	NH

(W) winner; (F) finalist; (SF) semifinalist; (QF) quarterfinalist; (#R) rounds 4, 3, 2, 1; (RR) round-robin stage; (Q#) qualification round; (P#) preliminary round; (DNQ) did not qualify; (A) absent; (Z#) Davis/Fed Cup Zonal Group (with number indication) or (PO) play-off; (G) gold, (S) silver or (B) bronze Olympic/Paralympic medal; (NMS) not a Masters tournament; (NTI) not a Tier I tournament; (P) postponed; (NH) not held; (SR) strike rate (events won / competed); (W–L) win–loss record.
To avoid confusion and double counting, these charts are updated at the conclusion of a tournament or when the player's participation has ended.

=== Singles matches ===
Tournament	Match	Round	Opponent (seed or key)	Rank	Result	Score
Australian Open; Melbourne, Australia; Grand Slam tournament Hard, outdoor 19 January – 1 February 2015
Australian Open; Melbourne, Australia; Grand Slam tournament Hard, outdoor 19 January – 1 February 2015	1 / 633	1R	(India) Yuki Bhambri (Q)	317	Win	6–3, 6–4, 7–6^{(7–3)}
Australian Open; Melbourne, Australia; Grand Slam tournament Hard, outdoor 19 January – 1 February 2015	2 / 634	2R	(Australia) Marinko Matosevic	81	Win	6–1, 6–3, 6–2
Australian Open; Melbourne, Australia; Grand Slam tournament Hard, outdoor 19 January – 1 February 2015	3 / 635	3R	(Portugal) João Sousa	55	Win	6–1, 6–1, 7–5
Australian Open; Melbourne, Australia; Grand Slam tournament Hard, outdoor 19 January – 1 February 2015	4 / 636	4R	(Bulgaria) Grigor Dimitrov (10)	11	Win	6–4, 6–7^{(5–7)}, 6–3, 7–5
Australian Open; Melbourne, Australia; Grand Slam tournament Hard, outdoor 19 January – 1 February 2015	5 / 637	QF	(Australia) Nick Kyrgios	53	Win	6–3, 7–6^{(7–5)}, 6–3
Australian Open; Melbourne, Australia; Grand Slam tournament Hard, outdoor 19 January – 1 February 2015	6 / 638	SF	(Czech Republic) Tomáš Berdych (7)	7	Win	6–7^{(6–8)}, 6–0, 6–3, 7–5
Australian Open; Melbourne, Australia; Grand Slam tournament Hard, outdoor 19 January – 1 February 2015	7 / 639	F	(Serbia) Novak Djokovic (1)	1	Loss (1)	6–7^{(5–7)}, 7–6^{(7–4)}, 3–6, 0–6
Rotterdam Open; Rotterdam, Netherlands; ATP 500; Hard, indoor 9 – 15 February 2015
Rotterdam Open; Rotterdam, Netherlands; ATP 500; Hard, indoor 9 – 15 February 2015	8 / 640	1R	(France) Nicolas Mahut (Q)	109	Win	6–3, 6–2
Rotterdam Open; Rotterdam, Netherlands; ATP 500; Hard, indoor 9 – 15 February 2015	9 / 641	2R	(Canada) Vasek Pospisil	59	Win	6–3, 7–5
Rotterdam Open; Rotterdam, Netherlands; ATP 500; Hard, indoor 9 – 15 February 2015	10 / 642	QF	(France) Gilles Simon (8)	19	Loss	4–6, 2–6
Dubai Tennis Championships; Dubai, United Arab Emirates; ATP 500; Hard, outdoor 23 February – 1 March 2015
Dubai Tennis Championships; Dubai, United Arab Emirates; ATP 500; Hard, outdoor 23 February – 1 March 2015	11 / 643	1R	(Luxembourg) Gilles Müller	35	Win	6–4, 7–5
Dubai Tennis Championships; Dubai, United Arab Emirates; ATP 500; Hard, outdoor 23 February – 1 March 2015	12 / 644	2R	(Portugal) João Sousa	50	Win	6–0, 6–2
Dubai Tennis Championships; Dubai, United Arab Emirates; ATP 500; Hard, outdoor 23 February – 1 March 2015	13 / 645	QF	(Croatia) Borna Ćorić (LL)	84	Loss	1–6, 3–6
Davis Cup World Group First Round; Glasgow, United Kingdom; Davis Cup; Hard, indoor 6 – 8 March 2015
Davis Cup World Group First Round; Glasgow, United Kingdom; Davis Cup; Hard, indoor 6 – 8 March 2015	14 / 646	1R; R1	(United States) Donald Young	47	Win	6–1, 6–1, 4–6, 6–2
Davis Cup World Group First Round; Glasgow, United Kingdom; Davis Cup; Hard, indoor 6 – 8 March 2015	15 / 647	1R; R4	(United States) John Isner	20	Win	7–6^{(7–4)}, 6–3, 7–6^{(7–4)}
Indian Wells; Indian Wells, United States; ATP 1000; Hard, outdoor 9 – 22 March 2015
Indian Wells; Indian Wells, United States; ATP 1000; Hard, outdoor 9 – 22 March 2015	–	1R	Bye			
Indian Wells; Indian Wells, United States; ATP 1000; Hard, outdoor 9 – 22 March 2015	16 / 648	2R	(Canada) Vasek Pospisil	62	Win	6–1, 6–3
Indian Wells; Indian Wells, United States; ATP 1000; Hard, outdoor 9 – 22 March 2015	17 / 649	3R	(Germany) Philipp Kohlschreiber (26)	29	Win	6–1, 3–6, 6–1
Indian Wells; Indian Wells, United States; ATP 1000; Hard, outdoor 9 – 22 March 2015	18 / 650	4R	(France) Adrian Mannarino	38	Win	6–3, 6–3
Indian Wells; Indian Wells, United States; ATP 1000; Hard, outdoor 9 – 22 March 2015	19 / 651	QF	(Spain) Feliciano López (12)	12	Win	6–3, 6–4
Indian Wells; Indian Wells, United States; ATP 1000; Hard, outdoor 9 – 22 March 2015	20 / 652	SF	(Serbia) Novak Djokovic (1)	1	Loss	2–6, 3–6
Miami Open; Miami, United States; ATP 1000; Hard, outdoor 24 March – 5 April 2015
Miami Open; Miami, United States; ATP 1000; Hard, outdoor 24 March – 5 April 2015	–	1R	Bye			
Miami Open; Miami, United States; ATP 1000; Hard, outdoor 24 March – 5 April 2015	21 / 653	2R	(United States) Donald Young	44	Win	6–4, 6–2
Miami Open; Miami, United States; ATP 1000; Hard, outdoor 24 March – 5 April 2015	22 / 654	3R	(Colombia) Santiago Giraldo (27)	31	Win	6–3, 6–4
Miami Open; Miami, United States; ATP 1000; Hard, outdoor 24 March – 5 April 2015	23 / 655	4R	(South Africa) Kevin Anderson (15)	17	Win	6–4, 3–6, 6–3
Miami Open; Miami, United States; ATP 1000; Hard, outdoor 24 March – 5 April 2015	24 / 656	QF	(Austria) Dominic Thiem	52	Win	3–6, 6–4, 6–1
Miami Open; Miami, United States; ATP 1000; Hard, outdoor 24 March – 5 April 2015	25 / 657	SF	(Czech Republic) Tomáš Berdych (8)	9	Win	6–4, 6–4
Miami Open; Miami, United States; ATP 1000; Hard, outdoor 24 March – 5 April 2015	26 / 658	F	(Serbia) Novak Djokovic (1)	1	Loss (2)	6–7^{(3–7)}, 6–4, 0–6
Bavarian International Tennis Championships; Munich, Germany; ATP 250; Clay, outdoor 25 April – 4 May 2015
Bavarian International Tennis Championships; Munich, Germany; ATP 250; Clay, outdoor 25 April – 4 May 2015	–	1R	Bye			
Bavarian International Tennis Championships; Munich, Germany; ATP 250; Clay, outdoor 25 April – 4 May 2015	27 / 659	2R	(Germany) Mischa Zverev (Q)	653	Win	6–2, 6–2
Bavarian International Tennis Championships; Munich, Germany; ATP 250; Clay, outdoor 25 April – 4 May 2015	28 / 660	QF	(Czech Republic) Lukáš Rosol (9)	41	Win	4–6, 6–3, 6–2
Bavarian International Tennis Championships; Munich, Germany; ATP 250; Clay, outdoor 25 April – 4 May 2015	29 / 661	SF	(Spain) Roberto Bautista Agut (3)	16	Win	6–4, 6–4
Bavarian International Tennis Championships; Munich, Germany; ATP 250; Clay, outdoor 25 April – 4 May 2015	30 / 662	W	(Germany) Philipp Kohlschreiber (5)	26	Win (1)	7–6^{(7–4)}, 5–7, 7–6^{(7–4)}
Madrid Open; Madrid, Spain; ATP 1000; Clay, outdoor 4 – 10 May 2015
Madrid Open; Madrid, Spain; ATP 1000; Clay, outdoor 4 – 10 May 2015	–	1R	Bye			
Madrid Open; Madrid, Spain; ATP 1000; Clay, outdoor 4 – 10 May 2015	31 / 663	2R	(Germany) Philipp Kohlschreiber	24	Win	6–4, 3–6, 6–0
Madrid Open; Madrid, Spain; ATP 1000; Clay, outdoor 4 – 10 May 2015	32 / 664	3R	(Spain) Marcel Granollers (WC)	62	Win	6–2, 6–0
Madrid Open; Madrid, Spain; ATP 1000; Clay, outdoor 4 – 10 May 2015	33 / 665	QF	(Canada) Milos Raonic (5)	6	Win	6–4, 7–5
Madrid Open; Madrid, Spain; ATP 1000; Clay, outdoor 4 – 10 May 2015	34 / 666	SF	(Japan) Kei Nishikori (4)	5	Win	6–3, 6–4
Madrid Open; Madrid, Spain; ATP 1000; Clay, outdoor 4 – 10 May 2015	35 / 667	W	(Spain) Rafael Nadal (3)	4	Win (2)	6–3, 6–2
Italian Open; Rome, Italy; ATP 1000; Clay, outdoor 11 – 17 May 2015
Italian Open; Rome, Italy; ATP 1000; Clay, outdoor 11 – 17 May 2015	–	1R	Bye			
Italian Open; Rome, Italy; ATP 1000; Clay, outdoor 11 – 17 May 2015	36 / 668	2R	(France) Jérémy Chardy	38	Win	6–4, 6–3
Italian Open; Rome, Italy; ATP 1000; Clay, outdoor 11 – 17 May 2015	–	3R	(Belgium) David Goffin	20	Withdrew	N/A
French Open; Paris, France; Grand Slam tournament Clay, outdoor 24 May – 7 June 2015
French Open; Paris, France; Grand Slam tournament Clay, outdoor 24 May – 7 June 2015	37 / 669	1R	(Argentina) Facundo Argüello (LL)	137	Win	6–3, 6–3, 6–1
French Open; Paris, France; Grand Slam tournament Clay, outdoor 24 May – 7 June 2015	38 / 670	2R	(Portugal) João Sousa	44	Win	6–2, 4–6, 6–4, 6–1
French Open; Paris, France; Grand Slam tournament Clay, outdoor 24 May – 7 June 2015	39 / 671	3R	(Australia) Nick Kyrgios (29)	30	Win	6–4, 6–2, 6–3
French Open; Paris, France; Grand Slam tournament Clay, outdoor 24 May – 7 June 2015	40 / 672	4R	(France) Jérémy Chardy	45	Win	6–4, 3–6, 6–3, 6–2
French Open; Paris, France; Grand Slam tournament Clay, outdoor 24 May – 7 June 2015	41 / 673	QF	(Spain) David Ferrer (7)	8	Win	7–6^{(7–4)}, 6–2, 5–7, 6–1
French Open; Paris, France; Grand Slam tournament Clay, outdoor 24 May – 7 June 2015	42 / 674	SF	(Serbia) Novak Djokovic (1)	1	Loss	3–6, 3–6, 7–5, 7–5, 1–6
Queen's Club Championships; London, United Kingdom; ATP 500; Grass, outdoor 15 – 21 June 2015
Queen's Club Championships; London, United Kingdom; ATP 500; Grass, outdoor 15 – 21 June 2015	43 / 675	1R	(Chinese Taipei) Lu Yen-hsun (Q)	63	Win	6–4, 7–5
Queen's Club Championships; London, United Kingdom; ATP 500; Grass, outdoor 15 – 21 June 2015	44 / 676	2R	(Spain) Fernando Verdasco	42	Win	7–5, 6–4
Queen's Club Championships; London, United Kingdom; ATP 500; Grass, outdoor 15 – 21 June 2015	45 / 677	QF	(Luxembourg) Gilles Müller	48	Win	3–6, 7–6^{(7–2)}, 6–4
Queen's Club Championships; London, United Kingdom; ATP 500; Grass, outdoor 15 – 21 June 2015	46 / 678	SF	(Serbia) Viktor Troicki	25	Win	6–3, 7–6^{(7–4)}
Queen's Club Championships; London, United Kingdom; ATP 500; Grass, outdoor 15 – 21 June 2015	47 / 679	W	(South Africa) Kevin Anderson	17	Win (3)	6–3, 6–4
Wimbledon Championships; London, United Kingdom; Grand Slam tournament Grass, outdoor 29 June – 12 July 2015
Wimbledon Championships; London, United Kingdom; Grand Slam tournament Grass, outdoor 29 June – 12 July 2015	48 / 680	1R	(Kazakhstan) Mikhail Kukushkin	59	Win	6–4, 7–6^{(7–3)}, 6–4
Wimbledon Championships; London, United Kingdom; Grand Slam tournament Grass, outdoor 29 June – 12 July 2015	49 / 681	2R	(Netherlands) Robin Haase	78	Win	6–1, 6–1, 6–4
Wimbledon Championships; London, United Kingdom; Grand Slam tournament Grass, outdoor 29 June – 12 July 2015	50 / 682	3R	(Italy) Andreas Seppi (25)	27	Win	6–2, 6–2, 1–6, 6–1
Wimbledon Championships; London, United Kingdom; Grand Slam tournament Grass, outdoor 29 June – 12 July 2015	51 / 683	4R	(Croatia) Ivo Karlović (23)	25	Win	7–6^{(9–7)}, 6–4, 5–7, 6–4
Wimbledon Championships; London, United Kingdom; Grand Slam tournament Grass, outdoor 29 June – 12 July 2015	52 / 684	QF	(Canada) Vasek Pospisil	56	Win	6–4, 7–5, 6–4
Wimbledon Championships; London, United Kingdom; Grand Slam tournament Grass, outdoor 29 June – 12 July 2015	53 / 685	SF	(Switzerland) Roger Federer (2)	2	Loss	5–7, 5–7, 4–6
Davis Cup World Group Quarter-final; London, United Kingdom; Davis Cup; Grass, outdoor 17 – 19 July 2015
Davis Cup World Group Quarter-final; London, United Kingdom; Davis Cup; Grass, outdoor 17 – 19 July 2015	54 / 686	QF; R2	(France) Jo-Wilfried Tsonga	12	Win	7–5, 7–6^{(12–10)}, 6–2
Davis Cup World Group Quarter-final; London, United Kingdom; Davis Cup; Grass, outdoor 17 – 19 July 2015	55 / 687	QF; R4	(France) Gilles Simon	11	Win	4–6, 7–6^{(7–5)}, 6–3, 6–0
Washington Open; Washington, United States; ATP 500; Hard, outdoor 3 – 9 August 2015
Washington Open; Washington, United States; ATP 500; Hard, outdoor 3 – 9 August 2015	–	1R	Bye			
Washington Open; Washington, United States; ATP 500; Hard, outdoor 3 – 9 August 2015	56 / 688	2R	(Russia) Teymuraz Gabashvili	53	Loss	4–6, 6–4, 6–7^{(4–7)}
Canadian Open; Montreal, Canada; ATP 1000; Hard, outdoor 10 – 16 August 2015
Canadian Open; Montreal, Canada; ATP 1000; Hard, outdoor 10 – 16 August 2015	–	1R	Bye			
Canadian Open; Montreal, Canada; ATP 1000; Hard, outdoor 10 – 16 August 2015	57 / 689	2R	(Spain) Tommy Robredo	22	Win	6–4, 7–5
Canadian Open; Montreal, Canada; ATP 1000; Hard, outdoor 10 – 16 August 2015	58 / 690	3R	(Luxembourg) Gilles Müller	46	Win	6–3, 6–2
Canadian Open; Montreal, Canada; ATP 1000; Hard, outdoor 10 – 16 August 2015	59 / 691	QF	(France) Jo-Wilfried Tsonga (10)	24	Win	6–4, 6–4
Canadian Open; Montreal, Canada; ATP 1000; Hard, outdoor 10 – 16 August 2015	60 / 692	SF	(Japan) Kei Nishikori (4)	4	Win	6–3, 6–0
Canadian Open; Montreal, Canada; ATP 1000; Hard, outdoor 10 – 16 August 2015	61 / 693	W	(Serbia) Novak Djokovic (1)	1	Win (4)	6–4, 4–6, 6–3
Cincinnati Masters; Cincinnati, United States; ATP 1000; Hard, outdoor 17 – 23 August 2015
Cincinnati Masters; Cincinnati, United States; ATP 1000; Hard, outdoor 17 – 23 August 2015	–	1R	Bye			
Cincinnati Masters; Cincinnati, United States; ATP 1000; Hard, outdoor 17 – 23 August 2015	62 / 694	2R	(United States) Mardy Fish (WC)	705	Win	6–4, 7–6^{(7–1)}
Cincinnati Masters; Cincinnati, United States; ATP 1000; Hard, outdoor 17 – 23 August 2015	63 / 695	3R	(Bulgaria) Grigor Dimitrov (16)	17	Win	4–6, 7–6^{(7–3)}, 7–5
Cincinnati Masters; Cincinnati, United States; ATP 1000; Hard, outdoor 17 – 23 August 2015	64 / 696	QF	(France) Richard Gasquet (12)	13	Win	4–6, 6–1, 6–4
Cincinnati Masters; Cincinnati, United States; ATP 1000; Hard, outdoor 17 – 23 August 2015	65 / 697	SF	(Switzerland) Roger Federer (2)	3	Loss	4–6, 6–7^{(6–8)}
US Open; New York City, United States; Grand Slam tournament Hard, outdoor 31 August – 13 September 2015
US Open; New York City, United States; Grand Slam tournament Hard, outdoor 31 August – 13 September 2015	66 / 698	1R	(Australia) Nick Kyrgios	37	Win	7–5, 6–3, 4–6, 6–1
US Open; New York City, United States; Grand Slam tournament Hard, outdoor 31 August – 13 September 2015	67 / 699	2R	(France) Adrian Mannarino	35	Win	5–7, 4–6, 6–1, 6–3, 6–1
US Open; New York City, United States; Grand Slam tournament Hard, outdoor 31 August – 13 September 2015	68 / 700	3R	(Brazil) Thomaz Bellucci (30)	30	Win	6–3, 6–2, 7–5
US Open; New York City, United States; Grand Slam tournament Hard, outdoor 31 August – 13 September 2015	69 / 701	4R	(South Africa) Kevin Anderson (15)	14	Loss	6–7^{(5–7)}, 3–6, 7–6^{(7–2)}, 6–7^{(0–7)}
Davis Cup World Group Semi-final; Glasgow, United Kingdom; Davis Cup; Hard, indoor 18 – 20 September 2015
Davis Cup World Group Semi-final; Glasgow, United Kingdom; Davis Cup; Hard, indoor 18 – 20 September 2015	70 / 702	SF; R1	(Australia) Thanasi Kokkinakis	72	Win	6–3, 6–0, 6–3
Davis Cup World Group Semi-final; Glasgow, United Kingdom; Davis Cup; Hard, indoor 18 – 20 September 2015	71 / 703	SF; R4	(Australia) Bernard Tomic	23	Win	7–5, 6–3, 6–2
Shanghai Masters; Shanghai, China; ATP 1000; Hard, outdoor 11 – 18 October 2015
Shanghai Masters; Shanghai, China; ATP 1000; Hard, outdoor 11 – 18 October 2015	–	1R	Bye			
Shanghai Masters; Shanghai, China; ATP 1000; Hard, outdoor 11 – 18 October 2015	72 / 704	2R	(United States) Steve Johnson	47	Win	6–2, 6–4
Shanghai Masters; Shanghai, China; ATP 1000; Hard, outdoor 11 – 18 October 2015	73 / 705	3R	(United States) John Isner (13)	13	Win	6–7^{(4–7)}, 6–4, 6–4
Shanghai Masters; Shanghai, China; ATP 1000; Hard, outdoor 11 – 18 October 2015	74 / 706	QF	(Czech Republic) Tomáš Berdych (5)	5	Win	6–1, 6–3
Shanghai Masters; Shanghai, China; ATP 1000; Hard, outdoor 11 – 18 October 2015	75 / 707	SF	(Serbia) Novak Djokovic (1)	1	Loss	1–6, 3–6
Paris Masters; Paris, France; ATP 1000; Hard, indoor 2 – 8 November 2015
Paris Masters; Paris, France; ATP 1000; Hard, indoor 2 – 8 November 2015	–	1R	Bye			
Paris Masters; Paris, France; ATP 1000; Hard, indoor 2 – 8 November 2015	76 / 708	2R	(Croatia) Borna Ćorić	46	Win	6–1, 6–2
Paris Masters; Paris, France; ATP 1000; Hard, indoor 2 – 8 November 2015	77 / 709	3R	(Belgium) David Goffin (16)	16	Win	6–1, 6–0
Paris Masters; Paris, France; ATP 1000; Hard, indoor 2 – 8 November 2015	78 / 710	QF	(France) Richard Gasquet (10)	9	Win	7–6^{(9–7)}, 3–6, 6–3
Paris Masters; Paris, France; ATP 1000; Hard, indoor 2 – 8 November 2015	79 / 711	SF	(Spain) David Ferrer (8)	8	Win	6–4, 6–3
Paris Masters; Paris, France; ATP 1000; Hard, indoor 2 – 8 November 2015	80 / 712	F	(Serbia) Novak Djokovic (1)	1	Loss (3)	2–6, 4–6
ATP World Tour Finals; London, United Kingdom; ATP Finals; Hard, indoor 15 – 22 November 2015
ATP World Tour Finals; London, United Kingdom; ATP Finals; Hard, indoor 15 – 22 November 2015	81 / 713	RR	(Spain) David Ferrer (7)	7	Win	6–4, 6–4
ATP World Tour Finals; London, United Kingdom; ATP Finals; Hard, indoor 15 – 22 November 2015	82 / 714	RR	(Spain) Rafael Nadal (5)	5	Loss	4–6, 1–6
ATP World Tour Finals; London, United Kingdom; ATP Finals; Hard, indoor 15 – 22 November 2015	83 / 715	RR	(Switzerland) Stan Wawrinka (4)	4	Loss	6–7^{(4–7)}, 4–6
Davis Cup World Group Final; Ghent, Belgium; Davis Cup; Clay, indoor 27 – 29 November 2015
Davis Cup World Group Final; Ghent, Belgium; Davis Cup; Clay, indoor 27 – 29 November 2015	84 / 716	W R1	(Belgium) Ruben Bemelmans	108	Win	6–3, 6–2, 7–5
Davis Cup World Group Final; Ghent, Belgium; Davis Cup; Clay, indoor 27 – 29 November 2015	85 / 717	W R4	(Belgium) David Goffin	16	Win	6–3, 7–5, 6–3

=== Doubles matches ===
Tournament	Match	Round	Opponent (seed or key)	Rank	Result	Score
Indian Wells; Indian Wells, United States; ATP 1000; Hard, outdoor 9 – 22 March 2015; Partner: (Australia) Thanasi Kokkinakis
Indian Wells; Indian Wells, United States; ATP 1000; Hard, outdoor 9 – 22 March 2015; Partner: (Australia) Thanasi Kokkinakis	1 / 114	1R	(Netherlands) Rojer / (Romania) Tecău (4)	9 / 9	Win	6–3, 7–5
Indian Wells; Indian Wells, United States; ATP 1000; Hard, outdoor 9 – 22 March 2015; Partner: (Australia) Thanasi Kokkinakis	2 / 115	2R	(Poland) Matkowski / (Serbia) Zimonjić	27 / 4	Loss	1–6, 4–6
Bavarian International Tennis Championships; Munich, Germany; ATP 250; Clay, outdoor 25 April – 4 May 2015; Partner: (Netherlands) Jean-Julien Rojer
Bavarian International Tennis Championships; Munich, Germany; ATP 250; Clay, outdoor 25 April – 4 May 2015; Partner: (Netherlands) Jean-Julien Rojer	3 / 116	1R	(South Africa) Klaasen / (Czech Republic) Rosol (3)	28 / 49	Win	7–5, 6–2
Bavarian International Tennis Championships; Munich, Germany; ATP 250; Clay, outdoor 25 April – 4 May 2015; Partner: (Netherlands) Jean-Julien Rojer	4 / 117	QF	(Australia) Junaid / (Canada) Shamasdin	66 / 55	Win	6–2, 6–2
Bavarian International Tennis Championships; Munich, Germany; ATP 250; Clay, outdoor 25 April – 4 May 2015; Partner: (Netherlands) Jean-Julien Rojer	5 / 118	SF	(Austria) Peya / (Brazil) Soares (1)	17 / 16	Loss	3–6, 2–6
Queen's Club Championships; London, United Kingdom; ATP 500; Grass, outdoor 15 – 21 June 2015; Partner: (United Kingdom) Dominic Inglot
Queen's Club Championships; London, United Kingdom; ATP 500; Grass, outdoor 15 – 21 June 2015; Partner: (United Kingdom) Dominic Inglot	6 / 119	1R	(Austria) Peya / (Brazil) Soares (1)	16 / 14	Loss	4–6, 6–7^{(3–7)}
Davis Cup World Group Quarter-final; London, United Kingdom; Davis Cup; Grass, outdoor 17 – 19 July 2015; Partner: (United Kingdom) Jamie Murray
Davis Cup World Group Quarter-final; London, United Kingdom; Davis Cup; Grass, outdoor 17 – 19 July 2015; Partner: (United Kingdom) Jamie Murray	7 / 120	QF; R3	(France) Mahut / (France) Tsonga	22 / 202	Win	4–6, 6–3, 7–6^{(7–5)}, 6–1
Washington Open; Washington, United States; ATP 500; Hard, outdoor 3 – 9 August 2015; Partner: (Canada) Daniel Nestor
Washington Open; Washington, United States; ATP 500; Hard, outdoor 3 – 9 August 2015; Partner: (Canada) Daniel Nestor	8 / 121	1R	(India) Bopanna / (Romania) Mergea (3)	11 / 8	Loss	6–2, 1–6, [3–10]
Canadian Open; Montreal, Canada; ATP 1000; Hard, outdoor 10 – 16 August 2015; Partner: (India) Leander Paes
Canadian Open; Montreal, Canada; ATP 1000; Hard, outdoor 10 – 16 August 2015; Partner: (India) Leander Paes	9 / 122	1R	(South Africa) Anderson / (France) Chardy	68 / 41	Win	6–3, 6–1
Canadian Open; Montreal, Canada; ATP 1000; Hard, outdoor 10 – 16 August 2015; Partner: (India) Leander Paes	10 / 123	2R	(United Kingdom) J. Murray / (Australia) Peers (7)	16 / 15	Loss	4–6, 6–7^{(9–11)}
Davis Cup World Group Semi-final; Glasgow, United Kingdom; Davis Cup; Hard, indoor 18 – 20 September 2015; Partner: (United Kingdom) Jamie Murray
Davis Cup World Group Semi-final; Glasgow, United Kingdom; Davis Cup; Hard, indoor 18 – 20 September 2015; Partner: (United Kingdom) Jamie Murray	11 / 124	SF; R3	(Australia) Groth / (Australia) Hewitt	90 / 139	Win	4–6, 6–3, 6–4, 6–7^{(6–8)}, 6–4
Paris Masters; Paris, France; ATP 1000; Hard, indoor 2 – 8 November 2015; Partner: (United Kingdom) Colin Fleming
Paris Masters; Paris, France; ATP 1000; Hard, indoor 2 – 8 November 2015; Partner: (United Kingdom) Colin Fleming	12 / 125	1R	(Austria) Peya / (Brazil) Soares	28 / 24	Loss	2–6, 2–6
Davis Cup World Group Final; Ghent, Belgium; Davis Cup; Clay, indoor 27 – 29 November 2015; Partner: (United Kingdom) Jamie Murray
Davis Cup World Group Final; Ghent, Belgium; Davis Cup; Clay, indoor 27 – 29 November 2015; Partner: (United Kingdom) Jamie Murray	13 / 126	W R3	(Belgium) Darcis / (Belgium) Goffin	596 / 378	Win	6–4, 4–6, 6–3, 6–2

=== Exhibitions ===
Tournament	Match	Round	Opponents (Seed or Key)	Rank	Result	Score
Mubadala World Tennis Championship; Abu Dhabi, United Arab Emirates; Singles exhibition Hard, outdoor 1 – 3 January 2015
Mubadala World Tennis Championship; Abu Dhabi, United Arab Emirates; Singles exhibition Hard, outdoor 1 – 3 January 2015	–	QF	(Spain) Feliciano López (5)	14	Win	7–6^{(7–1)}, 5–7, 6–4
Mubadala World Tennis Championship; Abu Dhabi, United Arab Emirates; Singles exhibition Hard, outdoor 1 – 3 January 2015	–	SF	(Spain) Rafael Nadal (2)	3	Win	6–2, 6–0
Mubadala World Tennis Championship; Abu Dhabi, United Arab Emirates; Singles exhibition Hard, outdoor 1 – 3 January 2015	–	W	(Serbia) Novak Djokovic (1)	1	Walkover	N/A
Hopman Cup; Perth, Western Australia, Australia; Mixed exhibition Hard, indoor 4 – 11 January 2015; Partner: (United Kingdom) Heather Watson
Hopman Cup; Perth, Western Australia, Australia; Mixed exhibition Hard, indoor 4 – 11 January 2015; Partner: (United Kingdom) Heather Watson	–	RR	(France) Benoît Paire	126	Win	6–2, 7–5
Hopman Cup; Perth, Western Australia, Australia; Mixed exhibition Hard, indoor 4 – 11 January 2015; Partner: (United Kingdom) Heather Watson	–	RR	(France) Alizé Cornet / (France) Benoît Paire	–	Win	6–2, 2–6, [10–8]
Hopman Cup; Perth, Western Australia, Australia; Mixed exhibition Hard, indoor 4 – 11 January 2015; Partner: (United Kingdom) Heather Watson	–	RR	(Poland) Jerzy Janowicz	43	Win	6–2, 6–4
Hopman Cup; Perth, Western Australia, Australia; Mixed exhibition Hard, indoor 4 – 11 January 2015; Partner: (United Kingdom) Heather Watson	–	RR	(Poland) Agnieszka Radwańska / (Poland) Jerzy Janowicz	–	Loss	4–6, 4–6
Hopman Cup; Perth, Western Australia, Australia; Mixed exhibition Hard, indoor 4 – 11 January 2015; Partner: (United Kingdom) Heather Watson	–	RR	(Australia) Marinko Matosevic	77	Win	6–3, 6–2
Hopman Cup; Perth, Western Australia, Australia; Mixed exhibition Hard, indoor 4 – 11 January 2015; Partner: (United Kingdom) Heather Watson	–	RR	(Australia) Casey Dellacqua / (Australia) Marinko Matosevic	–	Win	7–5, 6–1
Tie Break Tens; London, United Kingdom; Singles exhibition Hard, indoor 5 December 2015
Tie Break Tens; London, United Kingdom; Singles exhibition Hard, indoor 5 December 2015	–	RR	(United Kingdom) Kyle Edmund	102	Win	[10–7]
Tie Break Tens; London, United Kingdom; Singles exhibition Hard, indoor 5 December 2015	–	RR	(Spain) David Ferrer	7	Win	[10–4]
Tie Break Tens; London, United Kingdom; Singles exhibition Hard, indoor 5 December 2015	–	SF	(United Kingdom) Tim Henman	–	Win	[10–1]
Tie Break Tens; London, United Kingdom; Singles exhibition Hard, indoor 5 December 2015	–	F	(United Kingdom) Kyle Edmund	102	Loss	[7–10]

== Tournament schedule ==
=== Singles schedule ===
Murray's 2015 singles tournament schedule was as follows:

Date	Championship	Location	Category	Surface	Prev. result	Prev. points	New points	Outcome
19 January 2015– 1 February 2015	Australian Open	Melbourne	Grand Slam	Hard	QF	360	1,200	Lost in the final against Novak Djokovic
9 February 2015– 15 February 2015	Rotterdam Open	Rotterdam	ATP World Tour 500	Hard (i)	QF	90	90	Lost in the quarterfinals against Gilles Simon
23 February 2015– 1 March 2015	Dubai Tennis Championships	Dubai	ATP World Tour 500	Hard	DNS	0	90	Lost in the quarterfinals against Borna Ćorić
6 March 2015– 8 March 2015	Davis Cup: Great Britain vs USA; World Group First Round	Glasgow	Davis Cup	Hard (i)	QF	80	80	Great Britain def. United States, 3–2; Great Britain advanced to WG QF
9 March 2015– 22 March 2015	Indian Wells Masters	Indian Wells	ATP World Tour Masters 1000	Hard	4R	90	360	Lost in the semifinals against Novak Djokovic
23 March 2015– 5 April 2015	Miami Masters	Miami	ATP World Tour Masters 1000	Hard	QF	180	600	Lost in the final against Novak Djokovic
25 April 2015– 4 May 2015	Bavarian International Tennis Championships	Munich	ATP World Tour 250	Clay	DNS	0	250	Won in the final against Philipp Kohlschreiber
4 May 2015– 10 May 2015	Madrid Open	Madrid	ATP World Tour Masters 1000	Clay	3R	90	1,000	Won in the final against Rafael Nadal
11 May 2015– 17 May 2015	Italian Open	Rome	ATP World Tour Masters 1000	Clay	QF	180	90	Withdrew before third round match against David Goffin citing fatigue
24 May 2015– 7 June 2015	French Open	Paris	Grand Slam tournament	Clay	SF	720	720	Lost in the semifinals against Novak Djokovic
15 June 2015– 21 June 2015	Queen's Club Championships	London	ATP World Tour 500	Grass	3R	20	500	Won in the final against Kevin Anderson
29 June 2015– 12 July 2015	Wimbledon	London	Grand Slam tournament	Grass	QF	360	720	Lost in the semifinals against Roger Federer
17 July 2015– 19 July 2015	Davis Cup: Great Britain vs France; World Group Quarterfinals	London	Davis Cup	Grass	QF	65	130	Great Britain def. France, 3–1; Great Britain advanced to WG SF
3 August 2015– 9 August 2015	Washington Open	Washington	ATP World Tour 500	Hard	DNS	0	0	Lost in the second round against Teymuraz Gabashvili
10 August 2015– 16 August 2015	Canadian Open	Montreal	ATP World Tour Masters 1000	Hard	QF	180	1,000	Won in the final against Novak Djokovic
17 August 2015– 23 August 2015	Cincinnati Masters	Cincinnati	ATP World Tour Masters 1000	Hard	QF	180	360	Lost in the semifinals against Roger Federer
31 August 2015– 13 September 2015	US Open	New York City	Grand Slam tournament	Hard	QF	360	180	Lost in the fourth round against Kevin Anderson
18 September 2015– 20 September 2015	Davis Cup: Great Britain vs Australia; World Group Semifinals	Glasgow	Davis Cup	Hard (i)	QF	0	140	Great Britain def. Australia, 3–2; Great Britain advanced to WG F
12 October 2015– 18 October 2015	Shanghai Masters	Shanghai	ATP World Tour Masters 1000	Hard	3R	90	360	Lost in the semifinals against Novak Djokovic
2 November 2015– 8 November 2015	Paris Masters	Paris	ATP World Tour Masters 1000	Hard (i)	QF	180	600	Lost in the final against Novak Djokovic
16 November 2015– 22 November 2015	ATP World Tour Finals	London	ATP World Tour Finals	Hard (i)	RR	200	200	Did not advance from the group stage
27 November 2015– 29 November 2015	Davis Cup: Belgium vs Great Britain; World Group Final	Ghent	Davis Cup	Clay (i)	QF	0	275	Great Britain def. Belgium, 3–1; Great Britain wins 10th Davis Cup
Total year-end points						4805	8945	▲4140 difference

=== Doubles schedule ===
Date	Championship	Location	Category	Surface	Prev. result	Prev. points	New points	Outcome
9 March 2015– 22 March 2015	Indian Wells Masters	Indian Wells	ATP World Tour Masters 1000	Hard	2R	90	90	Lost in the second round against Matkowski / Zimonjić
25 April 2015– 4 May 2015	Bavarian International Tennis Championships	Munich	ATP World Tour 250	Clay	DNS	0	90	Lost in the semifinals against Peya / Soares
15 June 2015– 21 June 2015	Queen's Club Championships	London	ATP World Tour 500	Grass	DNS	0	0	Lost in the first round against Peya / Soares
17 July 2015– 19 July 2015	Davis Cup: Great Britain vs France; World Group Quarterfinals	London	Davis Cup	Grass	QF	50	50	Great Britain def. France, 3–1; Great Britain advanced to WG SF
3 August 2015– 9 August 2015	Washington Open	Washington	ATP World Tour 500	Hard	DNS	0	0	Lost in the first round against Bopanna / Mergea
10 August 2015– 16 August 2015	Canadian Open	Montreal	ATP World Tour Masters 1000	Hard	DNS	0	90	Lost in the second round against J. Murray / Peers
18 September 2015– 20 September 2015	Davis Cup: Great Britain vs Australia; World Group Semifinals	Glasgow	Davis Cup	Hard (i)	QF	0	90	Great Britain def. Australia, 3–2; Great Britain advanced to WG F
31 October 2015– 8 November 2015	Paris Masters	Paris	ATP World Tour Masters 1000	Hard (i)	DNS	0	0	Lost in the first round against Peya / Soares
27 November 2015– 29 November 2015	Davis Cup: Belgium vs Great Britain; World Group Final	Ghent	Davis Cup	Clay (i)	QF	0	95	Great Britain def. Belgium, 3–1; Great Britain wins 10th Davis Cup
Total year-end points						185	505	▲320 difference

== Yearly records ==
=== Head-to-head matchups ===
Ordered by number of wins (Bold denotes a top 10 player at the time of the most recent match between the two players, Italic denotes top 50; for players whose ranking changed over the course of the year, see the note for a more complete breakdown by ranking.)

- (Germany) Philipp Kohlschreiber 3–0
- (Portugal) João Sousa 3–0 (Note: Sousa was ranked outside the top 50 for their first meeting (1–0) but inside the top 50 for their following meetings (2–0).)
- (Canada) Vasek Pospisil 3–0
- (Luxembourg) Gilles Müller 3–0
- (Australia) Nick Kyrgios 3–0 (Note: Kyrgios was ranked outside the top 50 for their first meeting (1–0) but inside the top 50 for their following meetings (2–0).)
- (Czech Republic) **Tomáš Berdych** 3–0
- (Spain) **David Ferrer** 3–0
- (United States) Donald Young 2–0
- (France) Jérémy Chardy 2–0
- (France) Jo-Wilfried Tsonga 2–0
- (Japan) **Kei Nishikori** 2–0
- (Bulgaria) Grigor Dimitrov 2–0
- (France) Adrian Mannarino 2–0
- (United States) John Isner 2–0
- (France) **Richard Gasquet** 2–0 (Note: Gasquet was ranked inside the top 50 for their first meeting (1–0) but inside the top 10 for their second meeting (1–0).)
- (Belgium) David Goffin 2–0
- (South Africa) Kevin Anderson 2–1
- (India) Yuki Bhambri 1–0
- (Australia) Marinko Matosevic 1–0
- (France) Nicolas Mahut 1–0
- (Spain) Feliciano López 1–0
- (Colombia) Santiago Giraldo 1–0
- (Austria) Dominic Thiem 1–0
- (Germany) Mischa Zverev 1–0
- (Czech Republic) Lukáš Rosol 1–0
- (Spain) Roberto Bautista Agut 1–0
- (Spain) Marcel Granollers 1–0
- (Canada) **Milos Raonic** 1–0
- (Argentina) Facundo Argüello 1–0
- (Chinese Taipei) Lu Yen-hsun 1–0
- (Spain) Fernando Verdasco 1–0
- (Serbia) Viktor Troicki 1–0
- (Kazakhstan) Mikhail Kukushkin 1–0
- (Netherlands) Robin Haase 1–0
- (Italy) Andreas Seppi 1–0
- (Croatia) Ivo Karlović 1–0
- (Spain) Tommy Robredo 1–0
- (United States) Mardy Fish 1–0
- (Brazil) Thomaz Bellucci 1–0
- (Australia) Thanasi Kokkinakis 1–0
- (Australia) Bernard Tomic 1–0
- (United States) Steve Johnson 1–0
- (Belgium) Ruben Bemelmans 1–0
- (France) Gilles Simon 1–1
- (Spain) **Rafael Nadal** 1–1
- (Croatia) Borna Ćorić 1–1 (Note: Ćorić was ranked outside the top 50 for their first meeting (0–1) but inside the top 50 for their following meeting (1–0).)
- (Serbia) **Novak Djokovic** 1–6
- (Russia) Teymuraz Gabashvili 0–1
- (Switzerland) **Stan Wawrinka** 0–1
- (Switzerland) **Roger Federer** 0–2

=== Finals ===
==== Singles: 7 (4–3) ====
Category Grand Slam (0–1) ATP World Tour Finals (0–0) ATP World Tour Masters 1000 (2–2) ATP World Tour 500 (1–0) ATP World Tour 250 (1–0)	Titles by surface Hard (1–3) Clay (2–0) Grass (1–0)	Titles by conditions Outdoors (4–2) Indoors (0–1)

Outcome	No.	Date	Championship	Surface	Opponent in the final	Score in the final
Runner-up	15.	1 February 2015	Australian Open, Melbourne, Australia (4)	Hard	(Serbia) Novak Djokovic	6–7^{(5–7)}, 7–6^{(7–4)}, 3–6, 0–6
Runner-up	16.	5 April 2015	Miami Masters, Miami, United States (2)	Hard	(Serbia) Novak Djokovic	6–7^{(3–7)}, 6–4, 0–6
Winner	32.	4 May 2015	Bavarian International Tennis Championships, Munich, Germany	Clay	(Germany) Philipp Kohlschreiber	7–6 ^{(7–4)}, 5–7, 7–6 ^{(7–4)}
Winner	33.	9 May 2015	Madrid Open, Madrid, Spain (2)	Clay	(Spain) Rafael Nadal	6–3, 6–2
Winner	34.	21 June 2015	Queen's Club Championships, London, United Kingdom (4)	Grass	(South Africa) Kevin Anderson	6–3, 6–4
Winner	35.	16 August 2015	Canadian Open, Montreal, Canada (3)	Hard	(Serbia) Novak Djokovic	6–4, 4–6, 6–3
Runner-up	17.	8 November 2015	BNP Paribas Masters, Paris, France (1)	Hard	(Serbia) Novak Djokovic	2–6, 4–6

==== Team Competitions: 1 (Winner) ====
Outcome	No.	Date	Championship	Surface	Partners	Opponent in the final	Score in the final
Winner	1.	November 27–29, 2015	Davis Cup, Ghent, Belgium	Clay (i)	(United Kingdom) Kyle Edmund (United Kingdom) James Ward (United Kingdom) Jamie Murray	(Belgium) David Goffin (Belgium) Steve Darcis (Belgium) Ruben Bemelmans (Belgium) Kimmer Coppejans	3–1

=== Earnings ===
- **Bold** denotes tournament win.

#	Venue	Singles Prize Money	Year-to-date
1.	Australian Open	A$1,550,000	$1,273,015
2.	Rotterdam Open	€36,950	$1,314,812
3.	Dubai Championships	$52,030	$1,366,842
4.	Indian Wells	$220,230	$1,587,072
5.	Miami Masters	$439,420	$2,026,492
6.	**Bavarian International Tennis Championships**	€80,000	$2,113,468
7.	**Madrid Open**	€799,450	$3,008,293
8.	Italian Open	€40,930	$3,054,126
9.	French Open	€450,000	$3,549,441
10.	**Queens Club Championships**	€381,760	$3,979,417
11.	Wimbledon Championships	£470,000	$4,719,056
12.	Washington Open	$9,910	$4,728,966
13.	**Canadian Open**	$685,200	$5,414,166
14.	Cincinnati Masters	$180,370	$5,594,536
15.	US Open	$283,575	$5,878,111
16.	Shanghai Masters	$225,460	$6,103,571
17.	Paris Masters	€320,500	$6,456,153
18.	Tour Finals	$334,000	$6,790,153
As of 23 November 2015

Figures in United States dollars (USD) unless noted.

== See also ==
- 2015 ATP World Tour
- 2015 Novak Djokovic tennis season
- 2015 Rafael Nadal tennis season
- 2015 Roger Federer tennis season
- 2015 Stan Wawrinka tennis season
