= 2015 ABN AMRO World Tennis Tournament – Wheelchair singles =

Wheelchair singles
- 2015 ABN AMRO World Tennis Tournament

Final
- Champion: (Argentina) Gustavo Fernández
- Runner-up: (Belgium) Joachim Gérard
- Score: 6–0, 3–6, 6–1

Events
singles	doubles
WC Singles	WC Doubles
- ABN AMRO World Tennis Tournament

Shingo Kunieda was the defending champion, but chose not to participate.

Gustavo Fernández won the title, defeating Joachim Gérard in the final, 6–0, 3–6, 6–1.

== Seeds ==
1. (France) Stéphane Houdet (semifinals)
2. (United Kingdom) Gordon Reid (semifinals)
3. (Argentina) Gustavo Fernández (champion)
4. (Belgium) Joachim Gérard (final)

== Draw ==
Key

- Q = Qualifier
- WC = Wild card
- LL = Lucky loser
- Alt = Alternate
- ITF = ITF entry
- PR = Protected ranking
- SR = Special ranking
- SE = Special exempt
- JE = Junior exempt
- JR = Junior Accelerator Programme entrant
- CO = College Accelerator Programme entrant
- NG = Next Gen Accelerator Program entrant
- w/o = Walkover
- r = Retired
- d = Defaulted

First round
WC	(Netherlands) Rody de Bie	0	0
(France) Nicolas Peifer	6	6
(France) Frederic Catteneo	2	3
(Netherlands) Maikel Scheffers	6	6
(United Kingdom) Marc McCarroll	3	3
(United Kingdom) Alfie Hewett	6	6
(Netherlands) Tom Egberink	1	3
(Sweden) Stefan Olsson	6	6

Quarterfinals
1	(France) Stéphane Houdet	6	6
(France) Nicolas Peifer	4	3
3	(Argentina) Gustavo Fernández	6	7
(Netherlands) Maikel Scheffers	3	6
(United Kingdom) Alfie Hewett	3	4
4	(Belgium) Joachim Gérard	6	6
(Sweden) Stefan Olsson	1	0
2	(United Kingdom) Gordon Reid	6	6

Semifinals
1	(France) Stéphane Houdet	4	4
3	(Argentina) Gustavo Fernández	6	6
4	(Belgium) Joachim Gérard	6	4	6
2	(United Kingdom) Gordon Reid	3	6	3

Final
3	(Argentina) Gustavo Fernández	6	3	6
4	(Belgium) Joachim Gérard	0	6	1
