= 2015 BMW Open – Doubles =

Doubles
- 2015 BMW Open

Final
- Champions: (Austria) Alexander Peya (Brazil) Bruno Soares
- Runners-up: (Germany) Alexander Zverev (Germany) Mischa Zverev.
- Score: 4–6, 6–1, [10–5]

Events
Singles	Doubles
← 2014 ·	BMW Open	· 2016 →

Jamie Murray and John Peers were the defending champions, but lost in the quarterfinals to Alexander Zverev and Mischa Zverev.

Alexander Peya and Bruno Soares won the title, defeating the Zverev brothers in the final, 4–6, 6–1, [10–5].

== Seeds ==
1. (Austria) Alexander Peya / (Brazil) Bruno Soares (champions)
2. (United Kingdom) Jamie Murray / (Australia) John Peers (quarterfinals)
3. (South Africa) Raven Klaasen / (Czech Republic) Lukáš Rosol (first round)
4. (Germany) Andre Begemann / (Austria) Julian Knowle (semifinals)

== Draw ==
=== Key ===
- Q = Qualifier
- WC = Wild card
- LL = Lucky loser
- Alt = Alternate
- ITF = ITF entry
- PR = Protected ranking
- SR = Special ranking
- SE = Special exempt
- JE = Junior exempt
- JR = Junior Accelerator Programme entrant
- CO = College Accelerator Programme entrant
- NG = Next Gen Accelerator Program entrant
- w/o = Walkover
- r = Retired
- d = Defaulted

=== Draw ===
First round
1	(Austria) A Peya (Brazil) B Soares	5	7	[10]
(Ukraine) S Stakhovsky (Serbia) V Troicki	7	5	[4]
(Germany) J-L Struff (Austria) D Thiem	1	7^{7}	[5]
(India) L Paes (Czech Republic) R Štěpánek	6	6^{3}	[10]
3	(South Africa) R Klaasen (Czech Republic) L Rosol	5	2
(United Kingdom) A Murray (Netherlands) J-J Rojer	7	6
(United Kingdom) C Fleming (United Kingdom) J Marray	3	6	[14]
(Australia) R Junaid (Canada) A Shamasdin	6	2	[16]
WC	(Germany) F Mayer (Germany) F Moser	6	6
(Germany) B Becker (Germany) D Meffert	3	2
(Czech Republic) F Čermák (Czech Republic) J Veselý	6^{3}	4
4	(Germany) A Begemann (Austria) J Knowle	7^{7}	6
(Germany) D Brown (Germany) P Petzschner	4	4
WC	(Germany) A Zverev (Germany) M Zverev	6	6
(Dominican Republic) V Estrella Burgos (Brazil) J Souza	3	2
2	(United Kingdom) J Murray (Australia) J Peers	6	6

Quarterfinals
1	(Austria) A Peya (Brazil) B Soares	6	6
(India) L Paes (Czech Republic) R Štěpánek	2	1
(United Kingdom) A Murray (Netherlands) J-J Rojer	6	6
(Australia) R Junaid (Canada) A Shamasdin	2	2
WC	(Germany) F Mayer (Germany) F Moser	0	4
4	(Germany) A Begemann (Austria) J Knowle	6	6
WC	(Germany) A Zverev (Germany) M Zverev	3	6	[10]
2	(United Kingdom) J Murray (Australia) J Peers	6	3	[8]

Semifinals
1	(Austria) A Peya (Brazil) B Soares	6	6
(United Kingdom) A Murray (Netherlands) J-J Rojer	3	2
4	(Germany) A Begemann (Austria) J Knowle	6^{5}	6	[9]
WC	(Germany) A Zverev (Germany) M Zverev	7^{7}	4	[11]

Final
1	(Austria) A Peya (Brazil) B Soares	4	6	[10]
WC	(Germany) A Zverev (Germany) M Zverev	6	1	[5]
