= 2015 ABN AMRO World Tennis Tournament – Doubles =

Doubles
- 2015 ABN AMRO World Tennis Tournament

Final
- Champions: (Netherlands) Jean-Julien Rojer (Romania) Horia Tecău
- Runners-up: (United Kingdom) Jamie Murray (Australia) John Peers
- Score: 3–6, 6–3, [10–8]

Events
| Singles | Doubles |
| ← 2014 · | ABN AMRO World Tennis Tournament | · 2016 → |

Michaël Llodra and Nicolas Mahut were the defending champions, but Llodra chose not to participate this year. Mahut played alongside Vasek Pospisil, but lost in the first round to Julien Benneteau and Édouard Roger-Vasselin.
Jean-Julien Rojer and Horia Tecău won the title, defeating Jamie Murray and John Peers in the final, 3–6, 6–3, [10–8].

== Seeds ==
1. (France) Julien Benneteau / (France) Édouard Roger-Vasselin (quarterfinals, withdrew)
2. (Spain) Marcel Granollers / (Spain) Marc López (quarterfinals)
3. (Netherlands) Jean-Julien Rojer / (Romania) Horia Tecău (champions)
4. (India) Rohan Bopanna / (Canada) Daniel Nestor (quarterfinals)

== Draw ==
=== Key ===
- Q = Qualifier
- WC = Wild card
- LL = Lucky loser
- Alt = Alternate
- SE = Special exempt
- PR = Protected ranking
- ITF = ITF entry
- JE = Junior exempt
- w/o = Walkover
- r = Retired
- d = Defaulted
- SR = Special ranking

=== Draw ===
First round
1 | (France) J Benneteau (France) É Roger-Vasselin | 6 | 6
(France) N Mahut (Canada) V Pospisil | 4 | 4
LL | (United Kingdom) J Murray (Australia) J Peers | 6 | 6
(Spain) R Bautista Agut (Portugal) J Sousa | 3 | 4
4 | (India) R Bopanna (Canada) D Nestor | 6 | 6
(South Africa) R Klaasen (India) L Paes | 2 | 3
(United Kingdom) D Inglot (Romania) F Mergea | 6 | 7^{7}
Q | (United Kingdom) C Fleming (United Kingdom) J Marray | 2 | 6^{2}
WC | (Netherlands) J Huta Galung (Netherlands) G Smits | 1 | 3
(Pakistan) A-u-H Qureshi (Serbia) N Zimonjić | 6 | 6
(Sweden) R Lindstedt (Poland) M Matkowski | 2 | 5
3 | (Netherlands) J-J Rojer (Romania) H Tecău | 6 | 7
WC | (Germany) A Begemann (Netherlands) R Haase | 7^{10} | 6
(Czech Republic) L Rosol (Austria) D Thiem | 6^{8} | 4
(Germany) P Kohlschreiber (Austria) J Melzer | 4 | 2
2 | (Spain) M Granollers (Spain) M López | 6 | 6

Quarterfinals
1 | (France) J Benneteau (France) É Roger-Vasselin
LL | (United Kingdom) J Murray (Australia) J Peers | w/o
4 | (India) R Bopanna (Canada) D Nestor | 1 | 3
(United Kingdom) D Inglot (Romania) F Mergea | 6 | 6
(Pakistan) A-u-H Qureshi (Serbia) N Zimonjić | 6^{3} | 6^{3}
3 | (Netherlands) J-J Rojer (Romania) H Tecău | 7^{7} | 7^{7}
WC | (Germany) A Begemann (Netherlands) R Haase | 7 | 4 | [10]
2 | (Spain) M Granollers (Spain) M López | 5 | 6 | [7]

Semifinals
LL | (United Kingdom) J Murray (Australia) J Peers | 4 | 6 | [10]
(United Kingdom) D Inglot (Romania) F Mergea | 6 | 3 | [8]
3 | (Netherlands) J-J Rojer (Romania) H Tecău | 7^{7} | 6
WC | (Germany) A Begemann (Netherlands) R Haase | 6^{2} | 3

Final
LL | (United Kingdom) J Murray (Australia) J Peers | 6 | 3 | [8]
3 | (Netherlands) J-J Rojer (Romania) H Tecău | 3 | 6 | [10]

== Qualifying ==
=== Seeds ===
1. (United Kingdom) Jamie Murray / (Australia) John Peers (qualifying competition, lucky losers)
2. (United Kingdom) Colin Fleming / (United Kingdom) Jonathan Marray (qualified)

=== Qualifiers ===
1. (United Kingdom) Colin Fleming / (United Kingdom) Jonathan Marray

=== Lucky losers ===
1. (United Kingdom) Jamie Murray / (Australia) John Peers

=== Qualifying draw ===
First round
1 | (United Kingdom) Jamie Murray (Australia) John Peers | 6 | 6
WC | (Netherlands) Niels Lootsma (Germany) Alexander Zverev | 2 | 3
(Kazakhstan) Andrey Golubev (Russia) Andrey Kuznetsov | 6^{5} | 5
2 | (United Kingdom) Colin Fleming (United Kingdom) Jonathan Marray | 7^{7} | 7

Qualifying competition
1 | (United Kingdom) Jamie Murray (Australia) John Peers | 6^{3} | 6 | [6]
2 | (United Kingdom) Colin Fleming (United Kingdom) Jonathan Marray | 7^{7} | 2 | [10]
