= 2015 BMW Open – Singles =

Singles
- 2015 BMW Open

Final
- Champion: (United Kingdom) Andy Murray
- Runner-up: (Germany) Philipp Kohlschreiber
- Score: 7–6^{(7–4)}, 5–7, 7–6^{(7–4)}

Details
- Draw: 28 (4 Q / 3 WC )
- Seeds: 8

Events
Singles	Doubles
← 2014 ·	BMW Open	· 2016 →

Martin Kližan was the defending champion, but withdrew before the tournament began.
Andy Murray won his first clay-court title, defeating Philipp Kohlschreiber in the final, 7–6^{(7–4)}, 5–7, 7–6^{(7–4)}.

== Seeds ==
The top four seeds receive a bye into the second round.

1. (United Kingdom) Andy Murray (champion)
2. (France) Gaël Monfils (withdrew)
3. (Spain) Roberto Bautista Agut (semifinals)
4. (Belgium) David Goffin (quarterfinals)
5. (Germany) Philipp Kohlschreiber (final)
6. (Australia) Bernard Tomic (first round)
7. (Slovakia) Martin Kližan (withdrew)
8. (Italy) Fabio Fognini (second round)
9. (Czech Republic) Lukáš Rosol (quarterfinals)

== Draw ==
=== Key ===
- Q = Qualifier
- WC = Wild card
- LL = Lucky loser
- Alt = Alternate
- ITF = ITF entry
- PR = Protected ranking
- SR = Special ranking
- SE = Special exempt
- JE = Junior exempt
- JR = Junior Accelerator Programme entrant
- CO = College Accelerator Programme entrant
- NG = Next Gen Accelerator Program entrant
- w/o = Walkover
- r = Retired
- d = Defaulted

=== Finals ===
Semifinals
1	(United Kingdom) Andy Murray	6	6
3	(Spain) Roberto Bautista Agut	4	4
5	(Germany) Philipp Kohlschreiber	2	6	6
Q	(Austria) Gerald Melzer	6	1	4

Final
1	(United Kingdom) Andy Murray	7^{7}	5	7^{7}
5	(Germany) Philipp Kohlschreiber	6^{4}	7	6^{4}

=== Top half ===
First round
(Germany) J-L Struff	6^{6}	6	4
Q	(Germany) M Zverev	7^{8}	3	6
(Ukraine) S Stakhovsky	6	6
LL	(Russia) M Ledovskikh	0	0
WC	(Germany) F Mayer	2	2
9	(Czech Republic) L Rosol	6	6
(Uzbekistan) F Dustov	1	1^{r}
Q	(Czech Republic) R Štěpánek	6	4
(Serbia) V Troicki	6^{4}	4
(Dominican Republic) V Estrella Burgos	7^{7}	6
WC	(Serbia) J Tipsarević	5	6	7^{7}
6	(Australia) B Tomic	7	1	6^{3}

Second round
1	(United Kingdom) A Murray	6	6
Q	(Germany) M Zverev	2	2
(Ukraine) S Stakhovsky	5	2
9	(Czech Republic) L Rosol	7	6
3	(Spain) R Bautista Agut	6	6
Q	(Czech Republic) R Štěpánek	0	3
(Dominican Republic) V Estrella Burgos	6	6^{1}	7
WC	(Serbia) J Tipsarević	4	7^{7}	5

Quarterfinals
1	(United Kingdom) A Murray	4	6	6
9	(Czech Republic) L Rosol	6	3	2
3	(Spain) R Bautista Agut	4	6	6
(Dominican Republic) V Estrella Burgos	6	0	0

Semifinals
1	(United Kingdom) A Murray	6	6
3	(Spain) R Bautista Agut	4	4

=== Bottom half ===
First round
5	(Germany) P Kohlschreiber	6	6
(Czech Republic) J Veselý	1	2
WC	(Germany) A Zverev	4	6	6
(Germany) B Becker	6	1	2
Q	(Germany) D Brown	1	6^{2}
(Italy) S Bolelli	6	7^{7}
8	(Italy) F Fognini	6	7^{7}
LL	(Austria) B Trinker	2	6^{3}
(Canada) V Pospisil	7	4	6^{9}
(Austria) D Thiem	5	6	7^{11}
(Brazil) J Souza	4	4
(Spain) P Andújar	6	6

Second round
5	(Germany) P Kohlschreiber	6	6
WC	(Germany) A Zverev	2	4
(Italy) S Bolelli	6^{5}	7^{7}	1
4	(Belgium) D Goffin	7^{7}	6^{4}	6
8	(Italy) F Fognini	3	0
(Austria) D Thiem	6	6
(Spain) P Andújar	1^{r}
Q	(Austria) G Melzer	4

Quarterfinals
5	(Germany) P Kohlschreiber	2	6	6
4	(Belgium) D Goffin	6	3	4
(Austria) D Thiem	6^{5}	6	3
Q	(Austria) G Melzer	7^{7}	3	6

Semifinals
5	(Germany) P Kohlschreiber	2	6	6
Q	(Austria) G Melzer	6	1	4

== Qualifying ==
=== Seeds ===
1. (Germany) Dustin Brown (qualified)
2. (Slovakia) Norbert Gombos (qualifying competition)
3. (Czech Republic) Radek Štěpánek (qualified)
4. (Germany) Matthias Bachinger (first round)
5. (Germany) Michael Berrer (second round)
6. (Austria) Gerald Melzer (qualified)
7. (Czech Republic) Jan Hernych (second round)
8. (Germany) Nils Langer (qualifying competition)

=== Qualifiers ===
1. (Germany) Dustin Brown
2. (Germany) Mischa Zverev
3. (Czech Republic) Radek Štěpánek
4. (Austria) Gerald Melzer

=== Lucky losers ===
1. (Russia) Mikhail Ledovskikh
2. (Austria) Bastian Trinker

=== Qualifying draw ===
==== First qualifier ====
First round
1	(Germany) Dustin Brown	6	6
WC	(Germany) Louis Wessels	1	3
WC	(Germany) Stephan Hoiss	6	4	6
(Germany) Marc Sieber	4	6	4
(Germany) Kevin Krawietz	6	2	7^{11}
(Germany) Mats Moraing	3	6	6^{9}
WC	(Austria) Alexander Erler	4	4
8	(Germany) Nils Langer	6	6

Second round
1	(Germany) Dustin Brown	7^{7}	6
WC	(Germany) Stephan Hoiss	6^{3}	4
(Germany) Kevin Krawietz	5	1
8	(Germany) Nils Langer	7	6

Qualifying competition
1	(Germany) Dustin Brown	6	4	7^{9}
8	(Germany) Nils Langer	3	6	6^{7}

==== Second qualifier ====
First round
2	(Slovakia) Norbert Gombos	4	6	6
(Serbia) Miljan Zekić	6	3	2
(Brazil) Roberto Affonso	7^{8}	2	7
(Germany) Alexander Braun	6^{6}	6	5
(Germany) Mischa Zverev	6	6
WC	(Germany) Sebastian Prechtel	2	4
(Russia) Philipp Davydenko	3	2
5	(Germany) Michael Berrer	6	6

Second round
2	(Slovakia) Norbert Gombos	6	6
(Brazil) Roberto Affonso	1	2
(Germany) Mischa Zverev	7^{7}	4	6
5	(Germany) Michael Berrer	6^{4}	6	3

Qualifying competition
2	(Slovakia) Norbert Gombos	6^{5}	2
(Germany) Mischa Zverev	7^{7}	6

==== Third qualifier ====
First round
3	(Czech Republic) Radek Štěpánek	4	6	6
(Slovakia) Ivo Klec	6	3	3
(Germany) Daniel Brands	7^{7}	6
(Germany) Jan Choinski	6^{3}	3
(Germany) Johannes Härteis	4	3
(Austria) Bastian Trinker	6	6
(Germany) Richard Becker	6	4	6^{0}
7	(Czech Republic) Jan Hernych	4	6	7^{7}

Second round
3	(Czech Republic) Radek Štěpánek	4	6	7^{8}
(Germany) Daniel Brands	6	4	6^{6}
(Austria) Bastian Trinker	6	6
7	(Czech Republic) Jan Hernych	3	4

Qualifying competition
3	(Czech Republic) Radek Štěpánek	6	6
(Austria) Bastian Trinker	2	2

==== Fourth qualifier ====
First round
4	(Germany) Matthias Bachinger	2	6	5
(Russia) Mikhail Ledovskikh	6	3	7
(Germany) Tobias Simon	7	5	7^{8}
(Belarus) Maxim Dubarenco	5	7	6^{6}
(Germany) Florian Fallert	3	6	3
(Croatia) Filip Veger	6	1	6
(Germany) Philipp Petzschner	4	2
6	(Austria) Gerald Melzer	6	6

Second round
(Russia) Mikhail Ledovskikh	7^{7}	6^{6}	7
(Germany) Tobias Simon	6^{1}	7^{8}	5
(Croatia) Filip Veger	5	4
6	(Austria) Gerald Melzer	7	6

Qualifying competition
(Russia) Mikhail Ledovskikh	3	6	6^{4}
6	(Austria) Gerald Melzer	6	3	7^{7}
