= 2015 BMW Open =

- Date: 25 April – 3 May
- Edition: 100th
- Category: ATP World Tour 250 series
- Draw: 28S / 16D
- Prize money: €426,605
- Surface: Clay
- Location: Munich, Germany
- Venue: MTTC Iphitos

Champions

Singles
- (United Kingdom) Andy Murray

Doubles
- (Austria) Alexander Peya / (Brazil) Bruno Soares
- BMW Open

The 2015 BMW Open was a men's tennis tournament played on outdoor clay courts. It was the 100th edition of the event, and part of the ATP World Tour 250 series of the 2015 ATP World Tour. It took place at the MTTC Iphitos complex in Munich, Germany, from 25 April through 3 May 2015. First-seeded Andy Murray won the singles title.

== Singles main-draw entrants ==
=== Seeds ===
Country	Player	Rank^{1}	Seed
GBR	Andy Murray	3	1
~~FRA~~	~~Gaël Monfils~~	~~15~~	~~2~~
ESP	Roberto Bautista Agut	16	3
BEL	David Goffin	21	4
GER	Philipp Kohlschreiber	25	5
AUS	Bernard Tomic	26	6
~~SVK~~	~~Martin Kližan~~	~~28~~	~~7~~
ITA	Fabio Fognini	30	8
CZE	Lukáš Rosol	33	9

- Rankings are as of April 20, 2015.

=== Other entrants ===
The following players received wildcards into the main draw:

- (Germany) Florian Mayer
- (Serbia) Janko Tipsarević
- (Germany) Alexander Zverev

The following players received entry from the qualifying draw:

- (Germany) Dustin Brown
- (Austria) Gerald Melzer
- (Czech Republic) Radek Štěpánek
- (Germany) Mischa Zverev

The following players received entry as lucky losers:

- (Russia) Mikhail Ledovskikh
- (Austria) Bastian Trinker

=== Withdrawals ===
Before the tournament

- (France) Julien Benneteau →replaced by Jan-Lennard Struff
- (Croatia) Ivo Karlović →replaced by Farrukh Dustov
- (Slovakia) Martin Kližan →replaced by Bastian Trinker
- (France) Gaël Monfils →replaced by Mikhail Ledovskikh
- (Italy) Andreas Seppi →replaced by Vasek Pospisil

=== Retirements ===
- (Spain) Pablo Andújar
- (Uzbekistan) Farrukh Dustov

== Doubles main-draw entrants ==
=== Seeds ===
Country	Player	Country	Player	Rank^{1}	Seed
AUT	Alexander Peya	BRA	Bruno Soares	33	1
GBR	Jamie Murray	AUS	John Peers	51	2
RSA	Raven Klaasen	CZE	Lukáš Rosol	76	3
GER	Andre Begemann	AUT	Julian Knowle	80	4

- Rankings are as of April 20, 2015.

=== Other entrants ===
The following pairs received wildcards into the doubles main draw:

- (Germany) Florian Mayer / (Germany) Frank Moser
- (Germany) Alexander Zverev / (Germany) Mischa Zverev

== Champions ==
=== Singles ===
- (United Kingdom) Andy Murray defeated (Germany) Philipp Kohlschreiber, 7–6^{(7–4)}, 5–7, 7–6^{(7–4)}

=== Doubles ===
- (Austria) Alexander Peya / (Brazil) 'Bruno Soares defeated (Germany) Alexander Zverev / (Germany) Mischa Zverev, 4–6, 6–1, [10–5]
