= 2015 ABN AMRO World Tennis Tournament =

- Date: 9–15 February
- Edition: 42nd
- Category: ATP World Tour 500
- Draw: 32S / 16D
- Prize money: €1,478,850
- Surface: Hard / indoors
- Location: Rotterdam, Netherlands
- Venue: Rotterdam Ahoy

Champions

Singles
- (Switzerland) Stan Wawrinka

Doubles
- (Netherlands) Jean-Julien Rojer / (Romania) Horia Tecău

Wheelchair singles
- (Argentina) Gustavo Fernández

Wheelchair doubles
- (France) Stéphane Houdet / (United Kingdom) Gordon Reid
- ABN AMRO World Tennis Tournament

The 2015 ABN AMRO World Tennis Tournament, also known as the Rotterdam Open, was a men's tennis tournament played on indoor hard courts. It took place at the Rotterdam Ahoy arena in the Dutch city of Rotterdam, between 9–15 February 2015. It was the 42nd edition of the Rotterdam Open, whose official name is the ABN AMRO World Tennis Tournament. The competition was part of the ATP World Tour 500 series of the 2015 ATP World Tour. Fourth-seeded Stan Wawrinka won the singles title.

== Finals ==
=== Singles ===
- (Switzerland) Stanislas Wawrinka defeated (Czech Republic) Tomáš Berdych, 4–6, 6–3, 6–4

=== Doubles ===
- (Netherlands) Jean-Julien Rojer / (Romania) Horia Tecău defeated (United Kingdom) Jamie Murray / (Australia) John Peers, 3–6, 6–3, [10–8]

== Points and prize money ==
=== Point distribution ===
Event	W	F	SF	QF	Round of 16	Round of 32	Q	Q2	Q1
Singles	500	300	180	90	45	0	20	10	0
Doubles	500	300	180	90	0	—N/a	45	25	0

=== Prize money ===
Event	W	F	SF	QF	Round of 16	Round of 32^{1}	Q2	Q1
Singles	€358,540	€161,650	€76,570	€36,950	€18,840	€10,360	€1,165	€645
Doubles *	€105,920	€47,790	€22,530	€10,890	€5,590	—N/a	—N/a	—N/a

_{^{1} Qualifiers prize money is also the Round of 32 prize money}
_{* per team}

== Singles main-draw entrants ==
=== Seeds ===
Country	Player	Ranking^{1}	Seed
GBR	Andy Murray	4	1
CAN	Milos Raonic	6	2
CZE	Tomáš Berdych	7	3
SUI	Stan Wawrinka	9	4
BUL	Grigor Dimitrov	11	5
LAT	Ernests Gulbis	13	6
ESP	Roberto Bautista Agut	16	7
FRA	Gilles Simon	19	8

- ^{1} Rankings as of February 2, 2015.

=== Other entrants ===
The following players received wildcards into the main draw:

- (Netherlands) Robin Haase
- (Netherlands) Jesse Huta Galung
- (Germany) Alexander Zverev

The following players received entry from the qualifying draw:

- (Russia) Andrey Kuznetsov
- (France) Nicolas Mahut
- (France) Paul-Henri Mathieu
- (France) Édouard Roger-Vasselin

The following player received entry as a lucky loser:

- (Germany) Tobias Kamke

=== Withdrawals ===
Before the tournament

- (Croatia) Marin Čilić → replaced by João Sousa
- (Poland) Jerzy Janowicz (illness) → replaced by Tobias Kamke
- (France) Jo-Wilfried Tsonga → replaced by Simone Bolelli

=== Retirements ===
- (France) Julien Benneteau

== Doubles main-draw entrants ==
=== Seeds ===
Country	Player	Country	Player	Rank^{1}	Seed
FRA	Julien Benneteau	FRA	Édouard Roger-Vasselin	12	1
ESP	Marcel Granollers	ESP	Marc López	19	2
NED	Jean-Julien Rojer	ROU	Horia Tecău	26	3
IND	Rohan Bopanna	CAN	Daniel Nestor	31	4

- ^{1} Rankings are as of February 2, 2015.

=== Other entrants ===
The following pairs received wildcards into the main draw:

- (Germany) Andre Begemann / (Netherlands) Robin Haase
- (Netherlands) Jesse Huta Galung / (Netherlands) Glenn Smits

The following pair received entry from the qualifying draw:

- (United Kingdom) Colin Fleming / (United Kingdom) Jonathan Marray

The following pair received entry as lucky losers:

- (United Kingdom) Jamie Murray / (Australia) John Peers

=== Withdrawals ===
During the tournament

- (France) Julien Benneteau
