= 2015 ABN AMRO World Tennis Tournament – Singles =

Singles
- 2015 ABN AMRO World Tennis Tournament

Final
- Champion: (Switzerland) Stan Wawrinka
- Runner-up: (Czech Republic) Tomáš Berdych
- Score: 4–6, 6–3, 6–4

Details
- Draw: 32 (4 Q / 3 WC )
- Seeds: 8

Events
Singles	Doubles
- ABN AMRO World Tennis Tournament

Tomáš Berdych was the defending champion, but lost to Stan Wawrinka in the final, 6–4, 3–6, 4–6.

== Seeds ==
1. (United Kingdom) Andy Murray (quarterfinals)
2. (Canada) Milos Raonic (semifinals)
3. (Czech Republic) Tomáš Berdych (final)
4. (Switzerland) Stan Wawrinka (champion)
5. (Bulgaria) Grigor Dimitrov (second round)
6. (Latvia) Ernests Gulbis (first round)
7. (Spain) Roberto Bautista Agut (second round)
8. (France) Gilles Simon (semifinals)

== Draw ==
Key

- Q = Qualifier
- WC = Wild card
- LL = Lucky loser
- Alt = Alternate
- ITF = ITF entry
- PR = Protected ranking
- SR = Special ranking
- SE = Special exempt
- JE = Junior exempt
- JR = Junior Accelerator Programme entrant
- CO = College Accelerator Programme entrant
- NG = Next Gen Accelerator Program entrant
- w/o = Walkover
- r = Retired
- d = Defaulted

=== Finals ===
Semifinals
8	(France) Gilles Simon	2	1
3	(Czech Republic) Tomáš Berdych	6	6
4	(Switzerland) Stan Wawrinka	7^{7}	7^{9}
2	(Canada) Milos Raonic	6^{3}	6^{7}

Final
3	(Czech Republic) Tomáš Berdych	6	3	4
4	(Switzerland) Stan Wawrinka	4	6	6

=== Top half ===
First round
1	(United Kingdom) A Murray	6	6
Q	(France) N Mahut	3	2
(Canada) V Pospisil	6	6
(Germany) P Kohlschreiber	4	2
(France) J Benneteau	3^{r}
(France) J Chardy	3
(Portugal) J Sousa	7	3	2
8	(France) G Simon	5	6	6
3	(Czech Republic) T Berdych	6	7
LL	(Germany) T Kamke	1	5
WC	(Netherlands) R Haase	7^{7}	3	3
(Italy) A Seppi	6^{5}	6	6
Q	(France) É Roger-Vasselin	3	2
(France) G Monfils	6	6
WC	(Germany) A Zverev	4	1
7	(Spain) R Bautista Agut	6	6

Second round
1	(United Kingdom) A Murray	6	7
(Canada) V Pospisil	3	5
(France) J Chardy	4	3
8	(France) G Simon	6	6
3	(Czech Republic) T Berdych	6	3	6
(Italy) A Seppi	0	6	3
(France) G Monfils	7	7^{7}
7	(Spain) R Bautista Agut	5	6^{5}

Quarterfinals
1	(United Kingdom) A Murray	4	2
8	(France) G Simon	6	6
3	(Czech Republic) T Berdych	6	6
(France) G Monfils	1	4

Semifinals
8	(France) G Simon	2	1
3	(Czech Republic) T Berdych	6	6

=== Bottom half ===
First round
5	(Bulgaria) G Dimitrov	4	7^{7}	6
Q	(France) P-H Mathieu	6	6^{2}	2
(Belgium) D Goffin	6^{3}	7^{8}	3
(Luxembourg) G Müller	7^{7}	6^{6}	6
(Spain) G García-López	7^{7}	6
(Uzbekistan) D Istomin	6^{5}	4
WC	(Netherlands) J Huta Galung	3	6	3
4	(Switzerland) S Wawrinka	6	3	6
6	(Latvia) E Gulbis	4	2
(Austria) D Thiem	6	6
(Spain) M Granollers	2	6^{7}
(Ukraine) S Stakhovsky	6	7^{9}
(Italy) S Bolelli	6	6
(Czech Republic) L Rosol	3	1
Q	(Russia) A Kuznetsov	7^{7}	1	5
2	(Canada) M Raonic	6^{5}	6	7

Second round
5	(Bulgaria) G Dimitrov	2	6^{8}
(Luxembourg) G Müller	6	7^{10}
(Spain) G García-López	7^{7}	4	2
4	(Switzerland) S Wawrinka	6^{2}	6	6
(Austria) D Thiem	1	3
(Ukraine) S Stakhovsky	6	6
(Italy) S Bolelli	3	6^{2}
2	(Canada) M Raonic	6	7^{7}

Quarterfinals
(Luxembourg) G Müller	6^{3}	3
4	(Switzerland) S Wawrinka	7^{7}	6
(Ukraine) S Stakhovsky	6	3	4
2	(Canada) M Raonic	2	6	6

Semifinals
4	(Switzerland) S Wawrinka	7^{7}	7^{9}
2	(Canada) M Raonic	6^{3}	6^{7}

== Qualifying ==
=== Seeds ===
1. (Germany) Jan-Lennard Struff (first round)
2. (Russia) Andrey Kuznetsov (qualified)
3. (Kazakhstan) Andrey Golubev (first round)
4. (Austria) Jürgen Melzer (qualifying competition)
5. (France) Paul-Henri Mathieu (qualified)
6. (Germany) Tobias Kamke (qualifying competition, lucky loser)
7. (Turkey) Marsel İlhan (first round)
8. (United Kingdom) James Ward (withdrew)

=== Qualifiers ===
1. (France) Nicolas Mahut
2. (Russia) Andrey Kuznetsov
3. (France) Édouard Roger-Vasselin
4. (France) Paul-Henri Mathieu

=== Lucky losers ===
1. (Germany) Tobias Kamke

=== Qualifying draw ===
==== First qualifier ====
First round
1	(Germany) Jan-Lennard Struff	6	4	6^{14}
(Germany) Michael Berrer	4	6	7^{16}
(France) Nicolas Mahut	6	6
Alt	(Georgia (country)) Nikoloz Basilashvili	4	4

Qualifying competition
(Germany) Michael Berrer	7	4	6^{3}
(France) Nicolas Mahut	5	6	7^{7}

==== Second qualifier ====
First round
2	(Russia) Andrey Kuznetsov	6	6
WC	(Netherlands) Guy den Heijer	2	0
WC	(Netherlands) Niels Lootsma	6^{4}	4
6	(Germany) Tobias Kamke	7^{7}	6

Qualifying competition
2	(Russia) Andrey Kuznetsov	6	6
6	(Germany) Tobias Kamke	4	4

==== Third qualifier ====
First round
3	(Kazakhstan) Andrey Golubev	1	4
(Slovakia) Norbert Gombos	6	6
(France) Édouard Roger-Vasselin	6	6
7	(Turkey) Marsel İlhan	2	3

Qualifying competition
(Slovakia) Norbert Gombos	0	4
(France) Édouard Roger-Vasselin	6	6

==== Fourth qualifier ====
First round
4	(Austria) Jürgen Melzer	6	7^{7}
WC	(Netherlands) Jelle Sels	1	6^{5}
(Germany) Matthias Bachinger	6^{2}	5
5	(France) Paul-Henri Mathieu	7^{7}	7

Qualifying competition
4	(Austria) Jürgen Melzer	3	6^{1}
5	(France) Paul-Henri Mathieu	6	7^{7}
