= 2007 Rafael Nadal tennis season =

Statistics for Spanish tennis player

- Full name: Rafael Nadal Parera
- Country: Spain
- Calendar prize money: $4,896,935 (Singles $4,862,310, Doubles $34,625)

Singles
- Season record: 70–15
- Calendar titles: 6
- Year-end ranking: No. 2
- Ranking change from previous year: Steady

Grand Slam & significant results
- Australian Open: QF
- French Open: W
- Wimbledon: F
- US Open: 4R

Injuries
- Injuries: Knee Injury

The 2007 Rafael Nadal tennis season officially began on 1 January 2007 with the start of the Chennai Open. He won five titles, including one Major and three Masters.

== Year summary ==
Rafael Nadal started the year by playing in six hard-court tournaments. He lost in the semifinals and first round of his first two tournaments and then lost in the quarterfinals of the Australian Open to eventual runner-up Fernando González. After another quarterfinal loss at the Dubai Tennis Championships, he won the Indian Wells Masters after beating Novak Djokovic in the final, before losing to Djokovic in the quarterfinals of the 2007 Miami Masters.

He played five clay-court tournaments in Europe after that, winning the titles at the Monte-Carlo Masters, the Torneo Godó in Barcelona, and the Italian Open, before losing to Roger Federer in the final of the Hamburg Masters. This defeat ended his 81-match winning streak on clay, which is the male Open Era record for consecutive wins on a single surface. He bounced back quickly in the French Open, not dropping a set en route to the final where he faced Federer once again, this time winning in four sets to join Björn Borg as the only man to win three French Open titles in a row since 1914.

Between the tournaments in Barcelona and Rome, Nadal defeated Federer in the "Battle of Surfaces" exhibition match in Mallorca, Spain, with the tennis court being half grass and half clay.

Nadal played the Artois Championships at the Queen's Club in London for the second consecutive year. As in 2006, Nadal was upset in the quarterfinals. Nadal then won consecutive five-set matches during the third and fourth rounds of Wimbledon before being beaten by Federer in the five-set final. This was Federer's first five-set match at Wimbledon since 2001.

In July, Nadal beat the unseeded Stan Wawrinka in the final of the clay-court Stuttgart Open, which proved to be his last title of the year. He played three important tournaments during the North American summer hard court season. He was a semifinalist at the Canadian Masters in Montreal before losing his first match at the Cincinnati Masters. He was the second-seeded player at the US Open, but was defeated in the fourth round by David Ferrer, and spent the tournament dealing with a knee injury.

After a month-long break from tournament tennis, Nadal played the Madrid Masters in Madrid and the Paris Masters, but David Nalbandian beat him in straight sets in the quarterfinals and final of those tournaments. To end the year, Nadal won two of his three-round robin matches to advance to the semifinals of the Tennis Masters Cup in Shanghai, where Federer defeated him in straight sets.

In addition, there were rumors at the end of the year that the foot injury he suffered during 2005, caused long-term damage, which were given credence by coach Toni Nadal's claim that the problem was "serious". Nadal and his spokesman strongly denied this, however, with Nadal himself calling the story "totally false".

== Singles matches ==
| Tournament | Match | Round | Opponent | Rank | Result | Score |
| Chennai Open; Chennai, India; ATP World Tour 250; Hard, outdoor 1–8 January 2007 | 1 / 235 | 1R | (Germany) Rainer Schüttler | 96 | Win | 6–4, 6–2 |
| Chennai Open; Chennai, India; ATP World Tour 250; Hard, outdoor 1–8 January 2007 | 2 / 236 | 2R | (India) Karan Rastogi | 480 | Win | 6–4, 6–1 |
| Chennai Open; Chennai, India; ATP World Tour 250; Hard, outdoor 1–8 January 2007 | 3 / 237 | QF | (Italy) Davide Sanguinetti | 106 | Win | 6–3, 6–2 |
| Chennai Open; Chennai, India; ATP World Tour 250; Hard, outdoor 1–8 January 2007 | 4 / 238 | SF | (Belgium) Xavier Malisse | 37 | Loss | 4–6, 6–7^{(4–7)} |
| Medibank International; Sydney, Australia; ATP World Tour 250; Hard, outdoor 7–13 January 2007 | 5 / 239 | 1R | (Australia) Chris Guccione | 107 | Loss | 5–6 RET |
| Australian Open; Melbourne, Australia; Grand Slam; Hard, outdoor 15–28 January 2007 | 6 / 240 | 1R | (United States) Robert Kendrick | 90 | Win | 7–6^{(8–6)}, 6–3, 6–2 |
| Australian Open; Melbourne, Australia; Grand Slam; Hard, outdoor 15–28 January 2007 | 7 / 241 | 2R | (Germany) Philipp Kohlschreiber | 61 | Win | 7–5, 6–3, 4–6, 6–2 |
| Australian Open; Melbourne, Australia; Grand Slam; Hard, outdoor 15–28 January 2007 | 8 / 242 | 3R | (Switzerland) Stan Wawrinka | 40 | Win | 6–2, 6–2, 6–2 |
| Australian Open; Melbourne, Australia; Grand Slam; Hard, outdoor 15–28 January 2007 | 9 / 243 | 4R | (United Kingdom) Andy Murray | 16 | Win | 6–7^{(3–7)}, 6–4, 4–6, 6–3, 6–1 |
| Australian Open; Melbourne, Australia; Grand Slam; Hard, outdoor 15–28 January 2007 | 10 / 244 | QF | (Chile) Fernando González | 9 | Loss | 2–6, 4–6, 3–6 |
| Barclays Dubai Tennis Championships; Dubai, UAE; ATP World Tour 500; Hard, outdoor 26 February 26 – 4 March 2007 | 11 / 245 | 1R | (Cyprus) Marcos Baghdatis | 17 | Win | 3–6, 6–2, 6–3 |
| Barclays Dubai Tennis Championships; Dubai, UAE; ATP World Tour 500; Hard, outdoor 26 February 26 – 4 March 2007 | 12 / 246 | 2R | (Russia) Igor Andreev | 139 | Win | 6–2, 3–6, 7–6^{(7–2)} |
| Barclays Dubai Tennis Championships; Dubai, UAE; ATP World Tour 500; Hard, outdoor 26 February 26 – 4 March 2007 | 13 / 247 | QF | (Russia) Mikhail Youzhny | 18 | Loss | 6–7^{(5–7)}, 3–6 |
| Pacific Life Open; Indian Wells, United States; ATP World Tour Masters 1000; Hard, outdoor 5–18 March 2007 | – | 1R | Bye | | | |
| Pacific Life Open; Indian Wells, United States; ATP World Tour Masters 1000; Hard, outdoor 5–18 March 2007 | 14 / 248 | 2R | (France) Arnaud Clément | 53 | Win | 6–3, 7–6^{(7–3)} |
| Pacific Life Open; Indian Wells, United States; ATP World Tour Masters 1000; Hard, outdoor 5–18 March 2007 | 15 / 249 | 3R | (Spain) Fernando Verdasco | 33 | Win | 6–4, 6–4 |
| Pacific Life Open; Indian Wells, United States; ATP World Tour Masters 1000; Hard, outdoor 5–18 March 2007 | 16 / 250 | 4R | (Spain) Juan Carlos Ferrero | 23 | Win | 6–1, 6–1 |
| Pacific Life Open; Indian Wells, United States; ATP World Tour Masters 1000; Hard, outdoor 5–18 March 2007 | 17 / 251 | QF | (Argentina) Juan Ignacio Chela | 31 | Win | 7–5, 7–5 |
| Pacific Life Open; Indian Wells, United States; ATP World Tour Masters 1000; Hard, outdoor 5–18 March 2007 | 18 / 252 | SF | (United States) Andy Roddick | 3 | Win | 6–4, 6–3 |
| Pacific Life Open; Indian Wells, United States; ATP World Tour Masters 1000; Hard, outdoor 5–18 March 2007 | 19 / 253 | W | (Serbia) Novak Djokovic | 13 | Win (1) | 6–2, 7–5 |
| Sony Ericsson Open; Miami, United States; ATP World Tour Masters 1000; Hard, outdoor 21 March – 1 April 2007 | – | 1R | Bye | | | |
| Sony Ericsson Open; Miami, United States; ATP World Tour Masters 1000; Hard, outdoor 21 March – 1 April 2007 | 20 / 254 | 2R | (Brazil) Ricardo Mello | 127 | Win | 7–6^{(9–7)}, 6–2 |
| Sony Ericsson Open; Miami, United States; ATP World Tour Masters 1000; Hard, outdoor 21 March – 1 April 2007 | – | 3R | (Belgium) Olivier Rochus | 36 | Win | W/O |
| Sony Ericsson Open; Miami, United States; ATP World Tour Masters 1000; Hard, outdoor 21 March – 1 April 2007 | 21 / 255 | 4R | (Argentina) Juan Martín del Potro | 63 | Win | 6–0, 6–4 |
| Sony Ericsson Open; Miami, United States; ATP World Tour Masters 1000; Hard, outdoor 21 March – 1 April 2007 | 22 / 256 | QF | (Serbia) Novak Djokovic | 10 | Loss | 3–6, 4–6 |
| Monte Carlo Masters; Monte Carlo, Monaco; ATP World Tour Masters 1000; Clay, outdoor 14–22 April 2007 | – | 1R | Bye | | | |
| Monte Carlo Masters; Monte Carlo, Monaco; ATP World Tour Masters 1000; Clay, outdoor 14–22 April 2007 | 23 / 257 | 2R | (Argentina) Juan Ignacio Chela | 22 | Win | 6–3, 6–1 |
| Monte Carlo Masters; Monte Carlo, Monaco; ATP World Tour Masters 1000; Clay, outdoor 14–22 April 2007 | 24 / 258 | 3R | (Belgium) Kristof Vliegen | 52 | Win | 6–3, 6–1 |
| Monte Carlo Masters; Monte Carlo, Monaco; ATP World Tour Masters 1000; Clay, outdoor 14–22 April 2007 | 25 / 259 | QF | (Germany) Philipp Kohlschreiber | 59 | Win | 6–2, 6–3 |
| Monte Carlo Masters; Monte Carlo, Monaco; ATP World Tour Masters 1000; Clay, outdoor 14–22 April 2007 | 26 / 260 | SF | (Czech Republic) Tomáš Berdych | 14 | Win | 6–0, 7–5 |
| Monte Carlo Masters; Monte Carlo, Monaco; ATP World Tour Masters 1000; Clay, outdoor 14–22 April 2007 | 27 / 261 | W | (Switzerland) Roger Federer | 1 | Win (2) | 6–4, 6–4 |
| Torneo Godo; Barcelona, Spain; ATP World Tour 500; Clay, outdoor 23–29 April 2007 | – | 1R | Bye | | | |
| Torneo Godo; Barcelona, Spain; ATP World Tour 500; Clay, outdoor 23–29 April 2007 | 28 / 262 | 2R | (Belgium) Kristof Vliegen | 53 | Win | 6–1, 6–2 |
| Torneo Godo; Barcelona, Spain; ATP World Tour 500; Clay, outdoor 23–29 April 2007 | 29 / 263 | 3R | (Sweden) Thomas Johansson | 73 | Win | 6–1, 6–4 |
| Torneo Godo; Barcelona, Spain; ATP World Tour 500; Clay, outdoor 23–29 April 2007 | 30 / 264 | QF | (Italy) Potito Starace | 72 | Win | 6–2, 7–5 |
| Torneo Godo; Barcelona, Spain; ATP World Tour 500; Clay, outdoor 23–29 April 2007 | 31 / 265 | SF | (Spain) David Ferrer | 16 | Win | 7–5, 6–1 |
| Torneo Godo; Barcelona, Spain; ATP World Tour 500; Clay, outdoor 23–29 April 2007 | 32 / 266 | W | (Argentina) Guillermo Cañas | 28 | Win (3) | 6–3, 6–4 |
| Internazionali BNL d'Italia; Rome, Italy; ATP World Tour Masters 1000; Clay, outdoor 5–13 May 2007 | – | 1R | Bye | | | |
| Internazionali BNL d'Italia; Rome, Italy; ATP World Tour Masters 1000; Clay, outdoor 5–13 May 2007 | 33 / 267 | 2R | (Italy) Daniele Bracciali | 125 | Win | 6–4, 6–2 |
| Internazionali BNL d'Italia; Rome, Italy; ATP World Tour Masters 1000; Clay, outdoor 5–13 May 2007 | 34 / 268 | 3R | (Russia) Mikhail Youzhny | 16 | Win | 6–2, 6–2 |
| Internazionali BNL d'Italia; Rome, Italy; ATP World Tour Masters 1000; Clay, outdoor 5–13 May 2007 | 35 / 269 | QF | (Serbia) Novak Djokovic | 5 | Win | 6–2, 6–3 |
| Internazionali BNL d'Italia; Rome, Italy; ATP World Tour Masters 1000; Clay, outdoor 5–13 May 2007 | 36 / 270 | SF | (Russia) Nikolay Davydenko | 4 | Win | 7–6^{(7–3)}, 6–7^{(8–10)}, 6–4 |
| Internazionali BNL d'Italia; Rome, Italy; ATP World Tour Masters 1000; Clay, outdoor 5–13 May 2007 | 37 / 271 | W | (Chile) Fernando González | 6 | Win (4) | 6–2, 6–2 |
| Masters Series Hamburg; Hamburg, Germany; ATP World Tour Masters 1000; Clay, outdoor 14–22 May 2007 | – | 1R | Bye | | | |
| Masters Series Hamburg; Hamburg, Germany; ATP World Tour Masters 1000; Clay, outdoor 14–22 May 2007 | 38 / 272 | 2R | (Spain) Óscar Hernández | 69 | Win | 7–5, 6–1 |
| Masters Series Hamburg; Hamburg, Germany; ATP World Tour Masters 1000; Clay, outdoor 14–22 May 2007 | 39 / 273 | 3R | (Russia) Igor Andreev | 164 | Win | 6–4, 6–1 |
| Masters Series Hamburg; Hamburg, Germany; ATP World Tour Masters 1000; Clay, outdoor 14–22 May 2007 | 40 / 274 | QF | (Chile) Fernando González | 5 | Win | 6–4, 6–4 |
| Masters Series Hamburg; Hamburg, Germany; ATP World Tour Masters 1000; Clay, outdoor 14–22 May 2007 | 41 / 275 | SF | (Australia) Lleyton Hewitt | 21 | Win | 2–6, 6–3, 7–5 |
| Masters Series Hamburg; Hamburg, Germany; ATP World Tour Masters 1000; Clay, outdoor 14–22 May 2007 | 42 / 276 | F | (Switzerland) Roger Federer | 1 | Loss (1) | 6–2, 2–6, 0–6 |
| French Open; Paris, France; Grand Slam; Clay, outdoor 27 May – 10 June 2007 | 43 / 277 | 1R | (Argentina) Juan Martín del Potro | 59 | Win | 7–5, 6–3, 6–2 |
| French Open; Paris, France; Grand Slam; Clay, outdoor 27 May – 10 June 2007 | 44 / 278 | 2R | (Italy) Flavio Cipolla | 227 | Win | 6–2, 6–1, 6–4 |
| French Open; Paris, France; Grand Slam; Clay, outdoor 27 May – 10 June 2007 | 45 / 279 | 3R | (Spain) Albert Montañés | 50 | Win | 6–1, 6–3, 6–2 |
| French Open; Paris, France; Grand Slam; Clay, outdoor 27 May – 10 June 2007 | 46 / 280 | 4R | (Australia) Lleyton Hewitt | 16 | Win | 6–3, 6–1, 7–6^{(7–5)} |
| French Open; Paris, France; Grand Slam; Clay, outdoor 27 May – 10 June 2007 | 47 / 281 | QF | (Spain) Carlos Moyá | 26 | Win | 6–4, 6–3, 6–0 |
| French Open; Paris, France; Grand Slam; Clay, outdoor 27 May – 10 June 2007 | 48 / 282 | SF | (Serbia) Novak Djokovic | 6 | Win | 7–5, 6–4, 6–2 |
| French Open; Paris, France; Grand Slam; Clay, outdoor 27 May – 10 June 2007 | 49 / 283 | W | (Switzerland) Roger Federer | 1 | Win (5) | 6–3, 4–6, 6–3, 6–4 |
| Stella Artois Championships; London, United Kingdom; ATP World Tour 250; Grass, outdoor 11–17 June 2007 | – | 1R | Bye | | | |
| Stella Artois Championships; London, United Kingdom; ATP World Tour 250; Grass, outdoor 11–17 June 2007 | 50 / 284 | 2R | (Argentina) Juan Martín del Potro | 59 | Win | 6–4, 6–4, |
| Stella Artois Championships; London, United Kingdom; ATP World Tour 250; Grass, outdoor 11–17 June 2007 | 51 / 285 | 3R | (Belarus) Max Mirnyi | 58 | Win | 7–6^{(7–3)}, 6–3 |
| Stella Artois Championships; London, United Kingdom; ATP World Tour 250; Grass, outdoor 11–17 June 2007 | 52 / 286 | QF | (France) Nicolas Mahut | 106 | Loss | 5–7, 6–7^{(0–7)} |
| The Championships, Wimbledon; Wimbledon, United Kingdom; Grand Slam; Grass, outdoor 25 June – 8 July 2007 | 53 / 287 | 1R | (United States) Mardy Fish | 38 | Win | 6–3, 7–6^{(7–4)}, 6–3 |
| The Championships, Wimbledon; Wimbledon, United Kingdom; Grand Slam; Grass, outdoor 25 June – 8 July 2007 | 54 / 288 | 2R | (Austria) Werner Eschauer | 72 | Win | 6–2, 6–4, 6–1 |
| The Championships, Wimbledon; Wimbledon, United Kingdom; Grand Slam; Grass, outdoor 25 June – 8 July 2007 | 55 / 289 | 3R | (Sweden) Robin Söderling | 28 | Win | 6–4, 6–4, 6–7^{(7–9)}, 4–6, 7–5 |
| The Championships, Wimbledon; Wimbledon, United Kingdom; Grand Slam; Grass, outdoor 25 June – 8 July 2007 | 56 / 290 | 4R | (Russia) Mikhail Youzhny | 13 | Win | 4–6, 3–6, 6–1, 6–2, 6–2 |
| The Championships, Wimbledon; Wimbledon, United Kingdom; Grand Slam; Grass, outdoor 25 June – 8 July 2007 | 57 / 291 | QF | (Czech Republic) Tomáš Berdych | 11 | Win | 7–6^{(7–1)}, 6–4, 6–2 |
| The Championships, Wimbledon; Wimbledon, United Kingdom; Grand Slam; Grass, outdoor 25 June – 8 July 2007 | 58 / 292 | SF | (Serbia) Novak Djokovic | 5 | Win | 3–6, 6–1, 4–1 RET |
| The Championships, Wimbledon; Wimbledon, United Kingdom; Grand Slam; Grass, outdoor 25 June – 8 July 2007 | 59 / 293 | F | (Switzerland) Roger Federer | 1 | Loss (2) | 6–7^{(7–9)}, 6–4, 6–7^{(3–7)}, 6–2, 2–6 |
| Mercedes Cup; Stuttgart, Germany; ATP World Tour 500; Clay, outdoor 16–23 July 2007 | 60 / 294 | 1R | (Germany) Alexander Waske | 135 | Win | 6–1, 6–1 |
| Mercedes Cup; Stuttgart, Germany; ATP World Tour 500; Clay, outdoor 16–23 July 2007 | 61 / 295 | 2R | (Germany) Philipp Kohlschreiber | 37 | Win | 6–3, 6–3 |
| Mercedes Cup; Stuttgart, Germany; ATP World Tour 500; Clay, outdoor 16–23 July 2007 | 62 / 296 | QF | (Argentina) Juan Mónaco | 29 | Win | 6–1, 6–3 |
| Mercedes Cup; Stuttgart, Germany; ATP World Tour 500; Clay, outdoor 16–23 July 2007 | 63 / 297 | SF | (Spain) Feliciano López | 84 | Win | 6–1, 7–5 |
| Mercedes Cup; Stuttgart, Germany; ATP World Tour 500; Clay, outdoor 16–23 July 2007 | 64 / 298 | W | (Switzerland) Stan Wawrinka | 50 | Win (6) | 6–4, 7–5 |
| Rogers Cup; Montreal, Canada; ATP World Tour Masters 1000; Hard, outdoor 6–12 August 2007 | – | 1R | Bye | | | |
| Rogers Cup; Montreal, Canada; ATP World Tour Masters 1000; Hard, outdoor 6–12 August 2007 | 65 / 299 | 2R | (Russia) Marat Safin | 22 | Win | 7–6^{(7–4)}, 6–0 |
| Rogers Cup; Montreal, Canada; ATP World Tour Masters 1000; Hard, outdoor 6–12 August 2007 | 66 / 300 | 3R | (France) Paul-Henri Mathieu | 23 | Win | 3–6, 6–3, 6–2 |
| Rogers Cup; Montreal, Canada; ATP World Tour Masters 1000; Hard, outdoor 6–12 August 2007 | 67 / 301 | QF | (Canada) Frank Dancevic | 91 | Win | 4–6, 6–2, 6–3 |
| Rogers Cup; Montreal, Canada; ATP World Tour Masters 1000; Hard, outdoor 6–12 August 2007 | 68 / 302 | SF | (Serbia) Novak Djokovic | 4 | Loss | 5–7, 3–6 |
| Western & Southern Financial Group Masters; Ohio, United States; ATP World Tour Masters 1000; Hard, outdoor 11–19 August 2007 | – | 1R | Bye | | | |
| Western & Southern Financial Group Masters; Ohio, United States; ATP World Tour Masters 1000; Hard, outdoor 11–19 August 2007 | 69 / 303 | 2R | (Argentina) Juan Mónaco | 25 | Loss | 6–7^{(5–7)}, 1–4 RET |
| US Open; New York, USA; Grand Slam; Hard, outdoor 27 August – 9 September 2007 | 70 / 304 | 1R | (Australia) Alun Jones | 123 | Win | 7–5, 3–6, 6–4, 6–1 |
| US Open; New York, USA; Grand Slam; Hard, outdoor 27 August – 9 September 2007 | 71 / 305 | 2R | (Serbia) Janko Tipsarević | 56 | Win | 6–2, 6–3, 3–2 RET |
| US Open; New York, USA; Grand Slam; Hard, outdoor 27 August – 9 September 2007 | 72 / 306 | 3R | (France) Jo-Wilfried Tsonga | 74 | Win | 7–6^{(7–3)}, 6–2, 6–1 |
| US Open; New York, USA; Grand Slam; Hard, outdoor 27 August – 9 September 2007 | 73 / 307 | 4R | (Spain) David Ferrer | 15 | Loss | 7–6^{(7–3)}, 4–6, 6–7^{(4–7)}, 2–6 |
| Mutua Madrileña Masters Madrid; Madrid, Spain; ATP World Tour Masters 1000; Hard, indoor 15–21 October 2007 | – | 1R | Bye | | | |
| Mutua Madrileña Masters Madrid; Madrid, Spain; ATP World Tour Masters 1000; Hard, indoor 15–21 October 2007 | 74 / 308 | 2R | (Cyprus) Marcos Baghdatis | 22 | Win | 6–4, 6–4 |
| Mutua Madrileña Masters Madrid; Madrid, Spain; ATP World Tour Masters 1000; Hard, indoor 15–21 October 2007 | 75 / 309 | 3R | (United Kingdom) Andy Murray | 17 | Win | 7–6^{(7–5)}, 6–4 |
| Mutua Madrileña Masters Madrid; Madrid, Spain; ATP World Tour Masters 1000; Hard, indoor 15–21 October 2007 | 76 / 310 | QF | (Argentina) David Nalbandian | 25 | Loss | 1–6, 2–6 |
| BNP Paribas Masters; Paris, France; ATP World Tour Masters 1000; Hard, indoor 27 October – 4 November 2007 | – | 1R | Bye | | | |
| BNP Paribas Masters; Paris, France; ATP World Tour Masters 1000; Hard, indoor 27 October – 4 November 2007 | 77 / 311 | 2R | (Italy) Filippo Volandri | 41 | Win | 6–3, 6–1 |
| BNP Paribas Masters; Paris, France; ATP World Tour Masters 1000; Hard, indoor 27 October – 4 November 2007 | 78 / 312 | 3R | (Switzerland) Stan Wawrinka | 36 | Win | 6–4, 6–3 |
| BNP Paribas Masters; Paris, France; ATP World Tour Masters 1000; Hard, indoor 27 October – 4 November 2007 | 79 / 313 | QF | (Russia) Mikhail Youzhny | 18 | Win | 6–4, 6–2 |
| BNP Paribas Masters; Paris, France; ATP World Tour Masters 1000; Hard, indoor 27 October – 4 November 2007 | 80 / 314 | SF | (Cyprus) Marcos Baghdatis | 22 | Win | 4–6, 6–4, 6–3 |
| BNP Paribas Masters; Paris, France; ATP World Tour Masters 1000; Hard, indoor 27 October – 4 November 2007 | 81 / 315 | F | (Argentina) David Nalbandian | 21 | Loss (3) | 4–6, 0–6 |
| Tennis Masters Cup; Shanghai, China; Year-end Championships; Hard, indoor 11–18 November 2007 | 82 / 316 | RR | (France) Richard Gasquet | 8 | Win | 3–6, 6–3, 6–4 |
| Tennis Masters Cup; Shanghai, China; Year-end Championships; Hard, indoor 11–18 November 2007 | 83 / 317 | RR | (Spain) David Ferrer | 6 | Loss | 6–4, 4–6, 3–6 |
| Tennis Masters Cup; Shanghai, China; Year-end Championships; Hard, indoor 11–18 November 2007 | 84 / 318 | RR | (Serbia) Novak Djokovic | 3 | Win | 6–4, 6–4 |
| Tennis Masters Cup; Shanghai, China; Year-end Championships; Hard, indoor 11–18 November 2007 | 85 / 319 | SF | (Switzerland) Roger Federer | 1 | Loss | 4–6, 1–6 |

== See also ==
- 2007 ATP Tour
- 2007 Roger Federer tennis season
