= 2007 ATP Masters Series =

Men's professional tennis tour

Details
- Duration: March 5 – November 4
- Edition: 18th
- Tournaments: 9

Achievements (singles)
- Most titles: (Spain) Rafael Nadal (3)
- Most finals: (Switzerland) Roger Federer (Spain) Rafael Nadal (5)

The ATP Masters Series is part of the elite tour for professional tennis organised by the ATP called the ATP Tour.

The table below shows the 2007 ATP Masters Series schedule.

The tournaments in the ATP Masters Series were mandatory for the top players, but there is no ranking for Masters events only. Masters events count for more ranking points than International Series events, but fewer than Grand Slam events.

== Results ==
* First-time champion

Masters	Singles champions	Runners-up	Score	Doubles champions	Runners-up	Score
Indian Wells Singles – Doubles	(Spain) Rafael Nadal	(Serbia) Novak Djokovic	6–2, 7–5	(Czech Republic) Martin Damm (India) Leander Paes	(Israel) Jonathan Erlich (Israel) Andy Ram	6–4, 6–4
Miami Singles – Doubles	(Serbia) Novak Djokovic*	(Argentina) Guillermo Cañas	6–3, 6–2, 6–4	(United States) Bob Bryan (United States) Mike Bryan	(Czech Republic) Martin Damm (India) Leander Paes	7–6^{(9–7)}, 3–6, [10–7]
Monte Carlo Singles – Doubles	(Spain) Rafael Nadal	(Switzerland) Roger Federer	6–4, 6–4	(United States) Bob Bryan (United States) Mike Bryan	(France) Julien Benneteau (France) Richard Gasquet	6–2, 6–1
Rome Singles – Doubles	(Spain) Rafael Nadal	(Chile) Fernando González	6–2, 6–2	(France) Fabrice Santoro (Serbia) Nenad Zimonjić	(United States) Bob Bryan (United States) Mike Bryan	6–4, 6–7^{(4–7)}, [10–7]
Hamburg Singles – Doubles	(Switzerland) Roger Federer	(Spain) Rafael Nadal	2–6, 6–2, 6–0	(United States) Bob Bryan (United States) Mike Bryan	(Australia) Paul Hanley (Zimbabwe) Kevin Ullyett	6–3, 6–4
Montreal Singles – Doubles	(Serbia) Novak Djokovic	(Switzerland) Roger Federer	7–6^{(7–2)}, 2–6, 7–6^{(7–2)}	(India) Mahesh Bhupathi	(Australia) Paul Hanley (Zimbabwe) Kevin Ullyett	6–4, 6–4
Montreal Singles – Doubles	(Serbia) Novak Djokovic	(Switzerland) Roger Federer	7–6^{(7–2)}, 2–6, 7–6^{(7–2)}	(Czech Republic) Pavel Vízner*	(Australia) Paul Hanley (Zimbabwe) Kevin Ullyett	6–4, 6–4
Cincinnati Singles – Doubles	(Switzerland) Roger Federer	(United States) James Blake	6–1, 6–4	(Israel) Jonathan Erlich* (Israel) Andy Ram*	(United States) Bob Bryan (United States) Mike Bryan	6–4, 3–6, [13–11]
Madrid Singles – Doubles	(Argentina) David Nalbandian*	(Switzerland) Roger Federer	1–6, 6–3, 6–3	(United States) Bob Bryan (United States) Mike Bryan	(Poland) Mariusz Fyrstenberg (Poland) Marcin Matkowski	6–3, 7–6^{(7–4)}
Paris Singles – Doubles	(Argentina) David Nalbandian	(Spain) Rafael Nadal	6–4, 6–0	(United States) Bob Bryan (United States) Mike Bryan	(Canada) Daniel Nestor (Serbia) Nenad Zimonjić	6–3, 7–6^{(7–4)}

== Tournament details ==
=== Indian Wells ===
Tournament name	Pacific Life Open
Dates	9 March – 18 March
Surface	Hardcourt
Location	Indian Wells, California, United States
Prize money	$3,285,000
Singles	Rafael Nadal d. Novak Djokovic 6–2, 7–5 (96 players)
Doubles	M Damm / L Paes d. J Erlich / A Ram, 6–4, 6–4 (32 pairs)

==== Singles ====
Fourth round
(Spain) C Moyà	6	2	3
14	(Spain) D Ferrer	1	6	6
12	(Serbia) N Djokovic	6	6
(France) J Benneteau	3	1
4	(Russia) N Davydenko	6^{3}	4
13	(United Kingdom) A Murray	7	6
9	(Germany) T Haas	6	6
5	(Chile) F González	3	2
8	(Croatia) I Ljubičić	2	6	6
10	(Argentina) D Nalbandian	6	4	2
15	(France) R Gasquet	6^{3}	3
3	(United States) A Roddick	7	6
30	(Argentina) JI Chela	6	6
WC	(United States) M Russell	4	4
22	(Spain) JC Ferrero	1	1
2	(Spain) R Nadal	6	6

Quarter-finals
14	(Spain) D Ferrer	3	4
12	(Serbia) N Djokovic	6	6
13	(United Kingdom) A Murray	3	6	7
9	(Germany) T Haas	6	3	6^{8}
8	(Croatia) I Ljubičić	6^{7}	6^{8}
3	(United States) A Roddick	7	7
30	(Argentina) JI Chela	5	5
2	(Spain) R Nadal	7	7

Semi-finals
12	(Serbia) N Djokovic	6	6
13	(United Kingdom) A Murray	2	3
3	(United States) A Roddick	4	3
2	(Spain) R Nadal	6	6

Final
12	(Serbia) N Djokovic	2	5
2	(Spain) R Nadal	6	7

Notes:

- Three-time winner Roger Federer lost to Guillermo Cañas in the second round after receiving a bye, ending a 41-match win streak. Cañas had originally been knocked out in qualifying by Alexander Waske, but due to an injury to one of the seeds he entered the main draw as a lucky loser. Cañas then lost his third-round match to Carlos Moyà.

==== Doubles ====
Quarter-finals
1	(Sweden) J Björkman / (Belarus) M Mirnyi	6	6
8	(United Kingdom) T Henman / A Murray	3	4
4	(Australia) P Hanley / (Zimbabwe) K Ullyett	3	6^{4}
5	(Czech Republic) M Damm / (India) L Paes	6	7
7	(Austria) J Knowle / J Melzer	3	7	11
(France) J Benneteau / R Gasquet	6	6^{5}	9
6	(Israel) J Erlich / A Ram	7	6
(Sweden) R Lindstedt / (Finland) J Nieminen	6^{5}	4

Semi-finals
1	(Sweden) J Björkman / (Belarus) M Mirnyi	2	7	10
5	(Czech Republic) M Damm / (India) L Paes	6	6^{5}	12
7	(Austria) J Knowle / J Melzer	2	5
6	(Israel) J Erlich / A Ram	6	7

Final
5	(Czech Republic) M Damm / (India) L Paes	6	6
6	(Israel) J Erlich / A Ram	4	4

Notes

- Bob Bryan and Mike Bryan, 2006 finalist, No. 2 seed and unbeaten for 12 games on the tour, lost in straight sets to the unseeded pair of Lindstedt (world No. 34) and Nieminen (world No. 73) in the first round.

=== Key Biscayne ===
Tournament name	Sony Ericsson Open
Dates	22 March – 1 April
Surface	Hardcourt
Location	Key Biscayne, Florida, United States
Prize money	$3,450,000
Singles	Novak Djokovic d. Guillermo Cañas 6–3, 6–2, 6–4 (96 players)
Doubles	B Bryan / M Bryan d. M Damm / L Paes 7–6 (9–7), 3–6, 10–7 (32 pairs)

==== Singles ====
Fourth round
1	(Switzerland) R Federer	6^{2}	6	6^{5}
Q	(Argentina) G Cañas	7	2	7
24	(Czech Republic) R Štěpánek	6^{4}	7	6^{3}
6	(Spain) T Robredo	7	5	7
Q	(United States) A Delic	3	2
23	(Argentina) JI Chela	6	6
20	(Finland) J Nieminen	6^{4}	4
7	(Croatia) I Ljubičić	7	6
(France) P-H Mathieu	6	5	3
12	(United Kingdom) A Murray	2	7	6
13	(Spain) D Ferrer	5	3
3	(United States) A Roddick	7	6
Q	(Spain) F López	0	3
10	(Serbia) N Djokovic	6	6
(Argentina) JM Del Potro	0	4
2	(Spain) R Nadal	6	6

Quarter-finals
Q	(Argentina) G Cañas	7	6
6	(Spain) T Robredo	6^{5}	1
23	(Argentina) JI Chela	3	5
7	(Croatia) I Ljubičić	6	7
12	(United Kingdom) A Murray	5
3	(United States) A Roddick	3^{r}
10	(Serbia) N Djokovic	6	6
2	(Spain) R Nadal	3	4

Semi-finals
Q	(Argentina) G Cañas	7	6
7	(Croatia) I Ljubičić	5	2
12	(United Kingdom) A Murray	1	0
10	(Serbia) N Djokovic	6	6

Final
Q	(Argentina) G Cañas	3	2	4
10	(Serbia) N Djokovic	6	6	6

==== Doubles ====
Quarter-finals
1	(Sweden) J Björkman / (Belarus) M Mirnyi	6^{5}	3
6	(Czech Republic) M Damm / (India) L Paes	7	6
3	(The Bahamas) M Knowles / (Canada) D Nestor	6	1	5
(France) A Clément / M Llodra	3	6	10
5	(France) F Santoro / (Serbia) N Zimonjić	4	6	12
4	(Australia) P Hanley / (Zimbabwe) K Ullyett	6	3	10
(Romania) A Pavel / (Germany) A Waske	6^{4}	7	8
2	(United States) B Bryan / M Bryan	7	6^{6}	10

Semi-finals
6	(Czech Republic) M Damm / (India) L Paes	6	3	12
(France) A Clément / M Llodra	4	6	10
5	(France) F Santoro / (Serbia) N Zimonjić	5	2
2	(United States) B Bryan / M Bryan	7	6

Final
6	(Czech Republic) M Damm / (India) L Paes	6^{7}	6	7
2	(United States) B Bryan / M Bryan	7	3	10

=== Monte Carlo ===
Tournament name	Masters Series Monte Carlo
Dates	16 April – 22 April
Surface	Clay
Location	Roquebrune-Cap-Martin, France
Prize money	$2,450,000
Singles	Rafael Nadal d. Roger Federer 6-4, 6-4 (56 players)
Doubles	B Bryan / M Bryan d. J Benneteau / R Gasquet 6-2, 6-1 (24 pairs)

==== Singles ====
Third round
1	(Switzerland) R Federer	6	6
(South Korea) Lee H-T	4	3
12	(Spain) D Ferrer	7	6
6	(Serbia) N Djokovic	5	4
(Russia) I Andreev	3	3
16	(Spain) JC Ferrero	6	6
11	(France) R Gasquet	6	6^{5}	7
7	(Croatia) I Ljubičić	3	7	5
5	(Spain) T Robredo	6	3	2
10	(Czech Republic) T Berdych	1	6	6
(Belarus) M Mirnyi	6^{5}	2
(Sweden) R Söderling	7	6
LL	(Spain) G García-López	7	6^{4}	6^{4}
Q	(Germany) P Kohlschreiber	5	7	7
(Belgium) K Vliegen	1	1
2	(Spain) R Nadal	6	6

Quarter-finals
1	(Switzerland) R Federer	6	6
12	(Spain) D Ferrer	4	0
16	(Spain) JC Ferrero	5	7	6
11	(France) R Gasquet	7	5	2
10	(Czech Republic) T Berdych	5	6	6
(Sweden) R Söderling	7	3	0
Q	(Germany) P Kohlschreiber	2	3
2	(Spain) R Nadal	6	6

Semi-finals
1	(Switzerland) R Federer	6	6
16	(Spain) JC Ferrero	3	4
10	(Czech Republic) T Berdych	0	5
2	(Spain) R Nadal	6	7

Final
1	(Switzerland) R Federer	4	4
2	(Spain) R Nadal	6	6

==== Doubles ====
Quarter-finals
1	(United States) B Bryan / M Bryan	6	6
(United States) A Fisher / J Thomas	0	2
(Chile) F González / (Croatia) I Ljubičić	4	6	10
5	(Australia) P Hanley / (Zimbabwe) K Ullyett	6	4	12
7	(Sweden) S Aspelin / (Austria) J Knowle	6	6
(Finland) J Nieminen / (Romania) A Pavel	3	4
(France) J Benneteau / R Gasquet	1	6	10
2	(Sweden) J Björkman / (Belarus) M Mirnyi	6	3	5

Semi-finals
1	(United States) B Bryan / M Bryan	7	6
5	(Australia) P Hanley / (Zimbabwe) K Ullyett	6^{2}	2
7	(Sweden) S Aspelin / (Austria) J Knowle	1	4
(France) J Benneteau / R Gasquet	6	6

Final
1	(United States) B Bryan / M Bryan	6	6
(France) J Benneteau / R Gasquet	2	1

=== Rome ===
Tournament name	Internazionali BNL d'Italia
Dates	7 May – 13 May
Surface	Clay
Location	Rome, Italy
Prize money	$2,450,000
Singles	Rafael Nadal d. Fernando González 6–2, 6–2 (56 players)
Doubles	F Santoro / N Zimonjić d. B Bryan / M Bryan 6–4 6–7 (4–7) 10–7 (24 pairs)

==== Singles ====
Third round
1	(Switzerland) R Federer	2	4
WC	(Italy) F Volandri	6	6
12	(Czech Republic) T Berdych	6	6
(Argentina) J Acasuso	1	2
3	(United States) A Roddick	0	4
(Argentina) JI Chela	6	6
Q	(Chile) N Massú	7	3	4
6	(Chile) F González	6^{4}	6	6
7	(Spain) T Robredo	6	6
(France) G Simon	2	2
WC	(Italy) P Starace	6	2	5
4	(Russia) N Davydenko	4	6	7
5	(Serbia) N Djokovic	6	7
(Cyprus) M Baghdatis	2	5
15	(Russia) M Youzhny	2	2
2	(Spain) R Nadal	6	6

Quarter-finals
WC	(Italy) F Volandri	6	6
12	(Czech Republic) T Berdych	2	3
(Argentina) JI Chela	3	4
6	(Chile) F González	6	6
7	(Spain) T Robredo	6	3	3
4	(Russia) N Davydenko	1	6	6
5	(Serbia) N Djokovic	2	3
2	(Spain) R Nadal	6	6

Semi-finals
WC	(Italy) F Volandri	1	2
6	(Chile) F González	6	6
4	(Russia) N Davydenko	6^{3}	7	4
2	(Spain) R Nadal	7	6^{8}	6

Final
6	(Chile) F González	2	2
2	(Spain) R Nadal	6	6

==== Doubles ====
Quarter-finals
1	(United States) B Bryan / M Bryan	6	6
(Spain) Moyà / Nadal	3	3
4	(The Bahamas) Knowles / (Canada) Nestor	6	7
5	(Australia) Hanley / (Zimbabwe) Ullyett	3	6^{4}
8	(Romania) Pavel / (Germany) Waske	3	4
3	(Czech Republic) Damm / (India) Paes	6	6
6	(France) Santoro / (Serbia) Zimonjić	6	6
(Croatia) Ljubičić / (United States) Thomas	2	4

Semi-finals
1	(United States) B Bryan / M Bryan	6	5	10
4	(The Bahamas) Knowles / (Canada) Nestor	4	7	3
3	(Czech Republic) Damm / (India) Paes	3	4
6	Santoro / Zimonjić	6	6

Final
1	(United States) B Bryan / M Bryan	4	7^{7}	7
6	(France) Santoro / (Serbia) Zimonjić	6	6^{4}	10

=== Hamburg ===
Tournament name	Masters Series Hamburg
Dates	14 May – 20 May
Surface	Clay
Location	Hamburg, Germany
Prize money	$2,450,000
Singles	Roger Federer d. Rafael Nadal 2–6 6–0 6–2 (56 players)
Doubles	B Bryan / M Bryan d. P Hanley / K Ullyett 6–3 6–4 (24 pairs)

==== Singles ====
Third round
1	(Switzerland) R Federer	6	6
15	(Spain) JC Ferrero	2	3
12	(Spain) D Ferrer	6	6
7	(Croatia) I Ljubičić	3	3
4	(Serbia) N Djokovic	7	4	6
(Finland) J Nieminen	5	6	4
(Spain) Moyà	1	6	6
8	(United States) J Blake	6	3	3
(Spain) N Almagro	6	6
(Argentina) J Acasuso	2	3
16	(Australia) L Hewitt	6	2	6
3	(Russia) N Davydenko	4	6	4
5	(Chile) F González	3	6	6
(Austria) J Melzer	6	3	4
(Russia) I Andreev	4	1
2	(Spain) R Nadal	6	6

Quarter-finals
1	(Switzerland) R Federer	6	4	6
12	(Spain) D Ferrer	3	6	3
4	(Serbia) N Djokovic	6^{4}	6	5
(Spain) C Moyà	7	4	7
(Spain) N Almagro	3	4
16	(Australia) L Hewitt	6	6
5	(Chile) F González	4	4
2	(Spain) R Nadal	6	6

Semi-finals
1	(Switzerland) R Federer	4	6	6
(Spain) C Moyà	6	4	2
16	(Australia) L Hewitt	6	3	5
2	(Spain) R Nadal	2	6	7

Final
1	(Switzerland) R Federer	2	6	6
2	(Spain) R Nadal	6	2	0

==== Doubles ====
Quarter-finals
1	(United States) B Bryan / M Bryan	6	7
(Switzerland) Y Allegro / (Cyprus) M Baghdatis	2	5
(United States) J Blake / M Fish	3	6^{2}
6	(Israel) J Erlich / A Ram	6	7
5	(Australia) P Hanley / (Zimbabwe) K Ullyett	2	7	10
(France) J Benneteau / A Clément	6	6^{5}	7
8	(Sweden) S Aspelin / (Austria) J Knowle	7	6
2	(Sweden) J Björkman / (Belarus) M Mirnyi	5	2

Semi-finals
1	(United States) B Bryan / M Bryan	6	3	10
6	(Israel) J Erlich / A Ram	2	6	7
5	(Australia) Hanley / (Zimbabwe) Ullyett	6	3	10
8	(Sweden) S Aspelin / (Austria) J Knowle	2	6	4

Final
1	(United States) B Bryan / M Bryan	6	6
5	(Australia) Hanley / (Zimbabwe) Ullyett	3	4

=== Canada ===
Tournament name	Rogers Masters
Dates	6 August – 12 August
Surface	Hard
Location	Montreal, Canada
Prize money	$2,450,000
Singles	Novak Djokovic d. Roger Federer 7–6(2), 2–6, 7–6(2) (56 players)
Doubles	M Bhupati / P Vízner d. P Hanley / K Ullyett 6–4, 6–4 (24 pairs)

==== Singles ====
Third round
1	(Switzerland) R Federer	6	6
Q	(Italy) F Fognini	1	1
(Australia) L Hewitt	6^{10}	7	7
(Slovakia) D Hrbatý	7	6^{6}	5
4	(Russia) N Davydenko	7	6
14	(Russia) M Youzhny	6^{8}	3
12	(Germany) T Haas	3	6	2
(Czech Republic) R Štěpánek	6	2	6
5	(United States) A Roddick	6	6
(Cyprus) M Baghdatis	2	3
(Argentina) D Nalbandian	2	3
3	(Serbia) N Djokovic	6	6
(Spain) F Verdasco	6	4	3
WC	(Canada) F Dancevic	4	6	6
(France) P-H Mathieu	6	3	2
2	(Spain) R Nadal	3	6	6

Quarter-finals
1	(Switzerland) R Federer	6	6
(Australia) L Hewitt	3	4
4	(Russia) N Davydenko	4	5
(Czech Republic) R Štěpánek	6	7
5	(United States) A Roddick	6^{4}	4
3	(Serbia) N Djokovic	7	6
WC	(Canada) F Dancevic	6	2	3
2	(Spain) R Nadal	4	6	6

Semi-finals
1	(Switzerland) R Federer	7	6
(Czech Republic) R Štěpánek	6^{6}	2
3	(Serbia) N Djokovic	7	6
2	(Spain) R Nadal	5	3

Final
1	(Switzerland) R Federer	6^{2}	6	6^{2}
3	(Serbia) N Djokovic	7	2	7

==== Doubles ====
Quarterfinals
1	(United States) B Bryan / M Bryan	6	7
(France) A Clément / R Gasquet	2	6^{3}
4	(Czech Republic) M Damm / (India) L Paes	6^{7}	6	8
8	(India) M Bhupati / (Czech Republic) P Vízner	7	2	10
5	(Australia) P Hanley / (Zimbabwe) K Ullyett	7	6
3	(The Bahamas) M Knowles / (Canada) D Nestor	6^{5}	4
6	(Israel) J Erlich / A Ram	6	7
2	(Sweden) J Björkman / (Belarus) M Mirnyi	1	5

Semifinals
1	(United States) B Bryan / M Bryan	2	6	10
8	(India) M Bhupati / (Czech Republic) P Vízner	6	4	12
5	(Australia) P Hanley / (Zimbabwe) K Ullyett	6	6
6	(Israel) J Erlich / A Ram	2	3

Finals
8	(India) M Bhupati / (Czech Republic) P Vízner	6	6
5	(Australia) P Hanley / (Zimbabwe) K Ullyett	4	4

=== Cincinnati ===
Tournament name	Western & Southern Financial Group Masters
Dates	13 August – 19 August
Surface	Hard
Location	Mason, Ohio, United States
Prize money	$2,450,000
Singles	Roger Federer d. James Blake 6–1, 6–4 (56 players)
Doubles	J Erlich / A Ram d. B Bryan / M Bryan 6–4, 3–6, 13–11 (24 pairs)

==== Singles ====
Third round
1	(Switzerland) R Federer	7	7
(Cyprus) M Baghdatis	6^{5}	5
(Spain) N Almagro	6	6
(Finland) J Nieminen	2	2
(Spain) C Moyà	7	3	7
Q	(Argentina) JM Del Potro	5	6	5
(Austria) J Melzer	3	3
(Australia) L Hewitt	6	6
5	(Russia) N Davydenko	6	6
10	(Czech Republic) T Berdych	3	2
16	(Spain) D Ferrer	7	6
3	(United States) A Roddick	6^{4}	4
(Spain) JC Ferrero	1	4
9	(United States) J Blake	6	6
WC	(United States) S Querrey	6	7
(Argentina) J Mónaco	3	5

Quarter-finals
1	(Switzerland) R Federer	6	3	6
(Spain) N Almagro	3	6	2
(Spain) C Moyà	2	4
(Australia) L Hewitt	6	6
5	(Russia) N Davydenko	6	6
16	(Spain) D Ferrer	2	4
9	(United States) J Blake	5	6	6
WC	(United States) S Querrey	7	4	4

Semi-finals
1	(Switzerland) R Federer	6	6^{7}	7
(Australia) L Hewitt	3	7	6^{1}
5	(Russia) N Davydenko	4	2
9	(United States) J Blake	6	6

Final
1	(Switzerland) R Federer	6	6
9	(United States) J Blake	1	4

==== Doubles ====
Quarterfinals
1	(United States) B Bryan / M Bryan	7	6
8	(Sweden) S Aspelin / (Austria) J Knowle	6^{2}	4
4	(Czech Republic) M Damm / (India) L Paes	5
5	(Australia) P Hanley / (Zimbabwe) K Ullyett	3^{r}
7	(Czech Republic) L Dlouhý / P Vízner	6	7
3	(The Bahamas) M Knowles / (Canada) D Nestor	4	5
6	(Israel) J Erlich / A Ram	6	6
(Serbia) N Djokovic / N Zimonjić	2	2

Semifinals
1	(United States) B Bryan / M Bryan	3	6	10
4	(Czech Republic) M Damm / (India) L Paes	6	0	7
7	(Czech Republic) L Dlouhý / P Vízner	6^{4}	5
6	(Israel) J Erlich / A Ram	7	7

Finals
1	(United States) B Bryan / M Bryan	4	6	11
6	(Israel) J Erlich / A Ram	6	3	13

=== Madrid ===
Tournament name	Mutua Madrilena Masters Madrid
Dates	15 October – 21 October
Surface	Greenset indoor
Location	Madrid, Spain
Prize money	$2,450,000
Singles	David Nalbandian d. Roger Federer 1-6, 6-3, 6-3 (48 players)
Doubles	B Bryan / M Bryan d. M Fyrstenberg / M Matkowski 6-3, 7-6(4) (16 pairs)

==== Singles ====
Third round
1	(Switzerland) R Federer	6	6
13	(Argentina) G Cañas	0	3
Q	(Austria) S Koubek	6^{7}	1
WC	(Spain) F López	7^{9}	6
(Croatia) I Karlović	6^{5}	6^{3}
(Germany) N Kiefer	7^{7}	7^{7}
(Argentina) J Mónaco	4	2
5	(Chile) F González	6	6
(Croatia) M Ančić	6	6
(France) P-H Mathieu	4	3
(Spain) JC Ferrero	3	6	4
3	(Serbia) N Djokovic	6	2	6
WC	(Argentina) JM Del Potro	2	4
(Argentina) D Nalbandian	6	6
(United Kingdom) A Murray	6^{5}	4
2	(Spain) R Nadal	7^{7}	6

Quarterfinals
1	(Switzerland) R Federer	7^{7}	6
WC	(Spain) F López	6^{4}	4
(Germany) N Kiefer	7^{7}	6
5	(Chile) F González	6^{5}	2
(Croatia) M Ančić	6^{2}	2
3	(Serbia) N Djokovic	7^{7}	6
(Argentina) D Nalbandian	6	6
2	(Spain) R Nadal	1	2

Semifinals
1	(Switzerland) R Federer	6	6
(Germany) N Kiefer	4	4
3	(Serbia) N Djokovic	4	6^{4}
(Argentina) D Nalbandian	6	7^{7}

Final
1	(Switzerland) R Federer	6	3	3
(Argentina) D Nalbandian	1	6	6

==== Doubles ====
Quarterfinals
1	(United States) B Bryan / M Bryan	6	7^{7}
6	(Romania) A Pavel / (Czech Republic) P Vízner	3	6^{4}
(Argentina) G Cañas / D Nalbandian	6	3	10
5	(Sweden) S Aspelin / (Austria) J Knowle	3	6	7
(Australia) J Kerr / T Perry	1	2
4	(Sweden) J Björkman / (Belarus) M Mirnyi	6	6
(Poland) M Fyrstenberg / M Matkowski	2	7^{7}	10
(South Africa) J Coetzee / (Netherlands) R Wassen	6	6^{4}	4

Semifinals
1	(United States) B Bryan / M Bryan	6	2	10
(Argentina) G Cañas / D Nalbandian	1	6	4
4	(Sweden) J Björkman / (Belarus) M Mirnyi	6^{4}	7	6
(Poland) Fyrstenberg / Matkowski	7^{7}	5	10

Finals
1	(United States) B Bryan / M Bryan	6	7^{7}
(Poland) M Fyrstenberg / M Matkowski	3	6^{4}

=== Paris ===
Tournament name	BNP Paribas Masters
Dates	29 October – 4 November
Surface	Carpet
Location	Paris, France
Prize money	$2,450,000
Singles	David Nalbandian d. Rafael Nadal 6-4, 6-0 (48 players)
Doubles	B Bryan / M Bryan d. D Nestor / N Zimonjić 6-3, 7-6(4) (16 pairs)

==== Singles ====
Third round
1	(Switzerland) R Federer	4	6^{3}
(Argentina) D Nalbandian	6	7^{7}
12	(Czech Republic) T Berdych	4	2
5	(Spain) D Ferrer	6	6
(France) F Santoro	4	2
15	(United Kingdom) A Murray	6	6
10	(France) R Gasquet	6	6
6	(United States) J Blake	4	4
8	(Spain) T Robredo	7	7
11	(Argentina) G Cañas	5	5
(Cyprus) M Baghdatis	6	6
4	(Russia) N Davydenko	2	2
(Russia) M Youzhny	6	1	6
9	(Germany) T Haas	4	6	3
(Switzerland) S Wawrinka	4	3
2	(Spain) R Nadal	6	6

Quarterfinals
(Argentina) D Nalbandian	7^{7}	6^{3}	6
5	(Spain) D Ferrer	6^{3}	7^{7}	2
15	(United Kingdom) A Murray	3	6	4
10	(France) R Gasquet	6	0	6
8	(Spain) T Robredo	4	4
(Cyprus) M Baghdatis	6	6
(Russia) M Youzhny	4	2
2	(Spain) R Nadal	6	6

Semifinals
(Argentina) D Nalbandian	6	6
10	(France) R Gasquet	2	4
(Cyprus) M Baghdatis	6	4	3
2	(Spain) R Nadal	4	6	6

Final
(Argentina) D Nalbandian	6	6
2	(Spain) R Nadal	4	0

==== Doubles ====
Quarterfinals
1	(United States) B Bryan / M Bryan	4	7^{7}	[10]
5	(Czech Republic) L Dlouhý / (Czech Republic) P Vízner	6	6^{2}	[8]
(Australia) J Kerr / (Brazil) A Sá	6^{3}	2
6	(Sweden) S Aspelin / (Austria) J Knowle	7^{7}	6
8	(France) A Clément / M Llodra	6	6
3	(Sweden) J Björkman / (Belarus) M Mirnyi	2	2
7	(Australia) P Hanley / (Zimbabwe) K Ullyett	6^{6}	3
2	(Canada) D Nestor / (Serbia) N Zimonjić	7^{8}	6

Semifinals
1	(United States) B Bryan / M Bryan	6	6
6	(Sweden) S Aspelin / (Austria) J Knowle	3	4
8	(France) A Clément / M Llodra	4	4
2	(Canada) D Nestor / (Serbia) N Zimonjić	6	6

Finals
1	(United States) B Bryan / M Bryan	6	7^{7}
2	(Canada) D Nestor / (Serbia) N Zimonjić	3	6^{4}

=== Masters Cup ===
Tournament name	Tennis Masters Cup Shanghai
Dates	11 November – 18 November
Surface	Hard, indoor
Location	Shanghai, China
Prize money	$4,450,000
Singles	Roger Federer d. David Ferrer 6-2, 6-3, 6-2 (8 players)
Doubles	M Knowles / D Nestor d. S Aspelin / J Knowle 6-2, 6-3 (8 pairs)

==== Singles ====
Semifinals
1	(Switzerland) R Federer	6	6
2	(Spain) R Nadal	4	1
5	(United States) A Roddick	1	3
6	(Spain) D Ferrer	6	6

Final
1	(Switzerland) R Federer	6	6	6
6	(Spain) D Ferrer	2	3	2

==== Doubles ====
Semifinals
3	(Sweden) S Aspelin/ (Austria) J Knowle	6	6
4	(Czech Republic) M Damm / (India) L Paes	4	4
2	(Australia) PHanley / (Zimbabwe) K Ullyett	3	7^{10}	5
1	(The Bahamas) M Knowles / (Canada) D Nestor	6	6^{8}	10

Final
3	(Sweden) S Aspelin / (Austria) J Knowle	2	3
1	(The Bahamas) M Knowles / (Canada) D Nestor	6	6

== Titles Champions ==
=== Singles ===
#	Player	IN	MI	MO	HA	RO	CA	CI	MA	PA	#	Winning span
1.	(United States) Andre Agassi	1	6	-	-	1	3	3	1	2	17	1990–2004 (15)
2.	(Switzerland) Roger Federer	3	2	-	4	-	2	2	1	-	14	2002–2007 (6)
3.	(United States) Pete Sampras	2	3	-	-	1	-	3	-	2	11	1992–2000 (9)
4.	(Spain) Rafael Nadal	1	-	3	-	3	1	-	1	-	9	2005–2007 (3)
5.	(Austria) Thomas Muster	-	1	3	-	3	-	-	1	-	8	1990–1997 (8)
6.	(United States) Michael Chang	3	1	-	-	-	1	2	-	-	7	1990–1997 (8)
7.	(United States) Jim Courier	2	1	-	-	2	-	-	-	-	5	1991–1993 (3)
	(Germany) Boris Becker	-	-	-	-	-	-	-	4	1	5	1990–1996 (7)
	(Brazil) Gustavo Kuerten	-	-	2	1	1	-	1	-	-	5	1999–2001 (3)
	(Chile) Marcelo Ríos	1	1	1	1	1	-	-	-	-	5	1997–1999 (3)
11.	(Sweden) Stefan Edberg	1	-	-	1	-	-	1	-	1	4	1990–1992 (3)
	(Spain) Juan Carlos Ferrero	-	-	2	-	1	-	1	-	-	4	2001–2003 (3)
	(Ukraine) Andrei Medvedev	-	-	1	3	-	-	-	-	-	4	1994–1997 (4)
	(United States) Andy Roddick	-	1	-	-	-	1	2	-	-	4	2003–2006 (4)
	(Russia) Marat Safin	-	-	-	-	-	1	-	1	3	4	2000–2004 (5)
16.	(Sweden) Thomas Enqvist	-	-	-	-	-	-	1	1	1	3	1996–2000 (5)
	(Spain) Carlos Moyá	-	-	1	-	1	-	1	-	-	3	1998–2004 (7)
18.	(Spain) Sergi Bruguera	-	-	2	-	-	-	-	-	-	2	1991–1993 (3)
	(Russia) Andrei Chesnokov	-	-	1	-	-	1	-	-	-	2	1990–1991 (2)
	(Argentina) Guillermo Coria	-	-	1	1	-	-	-	-	-	2	2003–2004 (2)
	(Spain) Àlex Corretja	1	-	-	-	1	-	-	-	-	2	1997–2000 (4)
	(Serbia) Novak Djokovic	-	1	-	-	-	1	-	-	-	2	2007
	(South Africa) Wayne Ferreira	-	-	-	-	-	1	-	1	-	2	1996–2000 (5)
	(France) Guy Forget	-	-	-	-	-	-	1	-	1	2	1991
	(Australia) Lleyton Hewitt	2	-	-	-	-	-	-	-	-	2	2002–2003 (2)
	(Croatia) Goran Ivanišević	-	-	-	-	-	-	-	1	1	2	1992–1993 (2)
	(Netherlands) Richard Krajicek	-	1	-	-	-	-	-	1	-	2	1998–1999 (2)
	(Argentina) David Nalbandian	-	-	-	-	-	-	-	1	1	2	2007
	(Australia) Patrick Rafter	-	-	-	-	-	1	1	-	-	2	1998
	(Germany) Michael Stich	-	-	-	1	-	-	-	1	-	2	1993
31.	(Spain) Juan Aguilera	-	-	-	1	-	-	-	-	-	1	1990
	(Czech Republic) Tomáš Berdych	-	-	-	-	-	-	-	-	1	1	2005
	(Argentina) Guillermo Cañas	-	-	-	-	-	1	-	-	-	1	2002
	(Spain) Albert Costa	-	-	-	1	-	-	-	-	-	1	1998
	(Spain) Roberto Carretero	-	-	-	1	-	-	-	-	-	1	1996
	(Russia) Nikolay Davydenko	-	-	-	-	-	-	-	-	1	1	2006
	(France) Sébastien Grosjean	-	-	-	-	-	-	-	-	1	1	2001
	(Germany) Tommy Haas	-	-	-	-	-	-	-	1	-	1	2001
	(United Kingdom) Tim Henman	-	-	-	-	-	-	-	-	1	1	2003
	(Sweden) Thomas Johansson	-	-	-	-	-	1	-	-	-	1	1999
	(Czech Republic) Petr Korda	-	-	-	-	-	-	-	1	-	1	1997
	(Spain) Félix Mantilla	-	-	-	-	1	-	-	-	-	1	2003
	(Sweden) Magnus Norman	-	-	-	-	1	-	-	-	-	1	2000
	(Czech Republic) Karel Nováček	-	-	-	1	-	-	-	-	-	1	1991
	(Romania) Andrei Pavel	-	-	-	-	-	1	-	-	-	1	2001
	(Sweden) Mikael Pernfors	-	-	-	-	-	1	-	-	-	1	1993
	(Australia) Mark Philippoussis	1	-	-	-	-	-	-	-	-	1	1999
	(France) Cédric Pioline	-	-	1	-	-	-	-	-	-	1	2000
	(Spain) Albert Portas	-	-	-	-	1	-	-	-	-	1	2001
	(Spain) Tommy Robredo	-	-	-	1	-	-	-	-	-	1	2006
	(United Kingdom) Greg Rusedski	-	-	-	-	-	-	-	-	1	1	1998
	(Spain) Emilio Sánchez	-	-	-	-	1	-	-	-	-	1	1991
	(United States) Chris Woodruff	-	-	-	-	-	1	-	-	-	1	1997
#	Player	IN	MI	MO	HA	RO	CA	CI	ST	PA	#	Winning span

== See also ==
- ATP Tour Masters 1000
- 2007 ATP Tour
- 2007 WTA Tier I Series
- 2007 WTA Tour
