= 2007 Roger Federer tennis season =

Statistics for Swiss tennis player

- Calendar prize money: $10,130,620

Singles
- Season record: 68–9 (88.31%)
- Calendar titles: 8
- Year-end ranking: No. 1
- Ranking change from previous year: Steady

Grand Slam & significant results
- Australian Open: W
- French Open: F
- Wimbledon: W
- US Open: W
- Other tournaments
- Tour Finals: W

Davis Cup
- Davis Cup: WG PO (adv. to 2008 WG)
- Last updated on: 31 December 2007.

Roger Federer made all four Major finals in 2007, winning three of them. He defeated Fernando González, 7–6(2), 6–4, 6–4, at the Australian Open, Rafael Nadal, 7–6(7), 4–6, 7–6(3), 2–6, 6–2, at Wimbledon, and Novak Djokovic, 7–6(4), 7–6(2), 6–4, at the US Open. However, Federer lost the 2007 French Open final to Nadal, 3–6, 6–4, 3–6, 4–6. Federer made five ATP Masters Series 1000 Finals in 2007, but only won two of those, in Hamburg and Cincinnati. Federer won 1 ATP 500 series event in Dubai. He ended the year by winning the year-end championships for the fourth time. In 2011 Stephen Tignor, chief editorial writer for Tennis.com, ranked Federer's 2007 season as the sixth greatest season of all-time during the Open Era.

== Year summary ==
=== Early Hard Court Season ===
Federer entered the Australian Open with a 29 match winning streak dating back to 2006 US Open. In the fourth round Federer faced future world no. 1 and multi-slam winner Novak Djokovic for the first time in a major, defeating him in straight sets. In the semifinals Federer faced American Andy Roddick in a highly anticipated rematch of the 2006 US Open final. Federer delivered a masterclass, crushing the American and delivering the most one sided match of their rivalry 6–4, 6–0, 6–2. Federer won his third Australian Open and 10th Grand Slam singles title, defeating Fernando González of Chile in the final. He became the first man since Björn Borg in 1980 to win a Grand Slam singles tournament without losing a set. At the end of the tournament Federer's winning streak stood at 36 consecutive matches, besting his previous career best 35 match winning streak in 2005.

Federer next played in Dubai where he was a three time former champion. Federer again played Djokovic in the quarterfinals and prevailed in a tight three set match. He defeated Mikhail Youzhny in the finals to capture his fourth Dubai title in the last five years. After his victory Federer's winning streak stood at 41 consecutive matches, just five shy of the all-time record held by Guillermo Vilas in 1977.

Entering Indian Wells, Federer was the three-time defending champion. He needed only to make the finals to tie Vilas' all-time record and if he won would have set a new all-time record for consecutive victories at 47. His winning streak of 41 consecutive matches, however, ended when he lost to Guillermo Cañas in the second round of the Pacific Life Open. This was a surprising loss and the first time he had suffered a defeat in six months.

The following week at the Sony Ericsson Open in Key Biscayne, Florida, he entered as the two-time defending champion. This tournament was disappointing as Federer again lost to Cañas, this time in the fourth round in three sets. However, he was awarded four ATP Awards during a ceremony at the tournament, making him the first player to receive four awards during the same year.

=== Clay Court Season ===
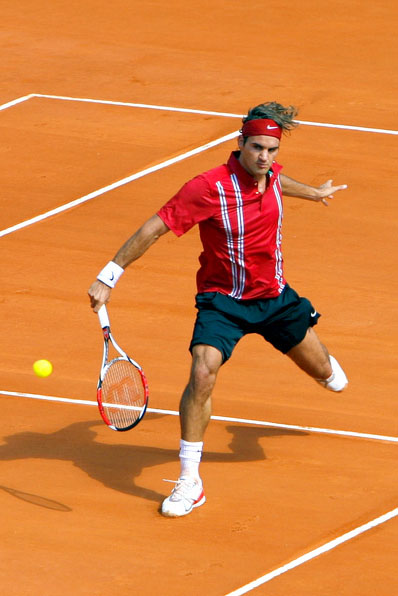
Federer during the 2007 clay season.

Federer started his clay-court season by reaching his second consecutive final of the Monte Carlo Masters. He did not drop a set until the finals, but lost again to second seed Nadal.

Federer also lost in the third round of the Internazionali d'Italia in Rome to Filippo Volandri. It was the first time that he had lost to anyone other than Nadal on clay since the 2005 Monte Carlo Masters. This defeat meant he had gone four tournaments without a title, his longest stretch since becoming world no. 1.

Federer rebounded, however, to defeat Nadal on clay for the first time, winning his fourth Hamburg Masters title, and ending Nadal's clay court streak of 81 consecutive matches.

After his victory over Nadal on clay two weeks earlier in Hamburg, speculation started on whether Federer could become the first man since Rod Laver to hold all four major titles simultaneously. Entering Roland Garros he was reigning champion of Wimbledon, the US Open, and the Australian Open and a victory at the French would mark a historical non-calendar year Grand Slam. At the French Open, Federer raced through the tournament, dropping only one set before reaching the final for the second consecutive year. Entering the final Federer had a 27 match winning streak at the majors and was seeking revenge for his 4 set loss to Nadal in the 2006 final. Federer played well in the final, but could not convert on the many opportunities he had to break the Nadal serve. Federer was 0 for 10 on break point chances in the first set, and only 1 for 17 overall. The result was a defeat at the hands of his arch-rival for the second straight year at the French finals, in four sets.

=== Grass Court Season ===
One day after the loss, Federer announced that he was withdrawing from his usual warm-up tournament in Halle, which he had won the last four years, citing fatigue and fear of getting an injury.

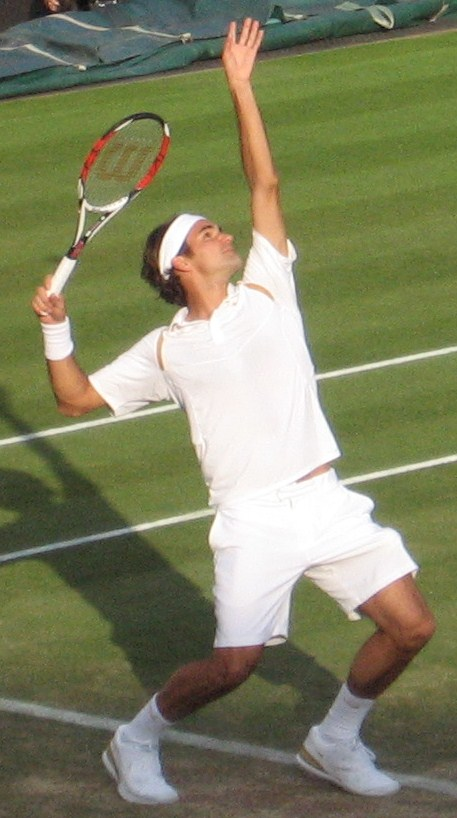
Federer serving during the 2007 Wimbledon Championships, where he won his record fifth consecutive title.

He, therefore, entered Wimbledon for the first time without having played a warm-up grass-court tournament. Federer, nevertheless, reached the finals of Wimbledon for the fifth time, only dropping one set. The final was a rematch of 2006 as Federer again faced his nemesis Rafael Nadal. The final would prove to be an epic, delivering the first five set final at Wimbledon since 2001. Federer won the first set in a tight tiebreaker which he won 9–7. Nadal responded in the second and took it 6–4, leveling the match at one set apiece. A pivotal third set was decided by another tiebreaker which Federer claimed 7–3. After the first three sets Federer was only one set away from his fifth consecutive Wimbledon championship. Nadal, however, refused to go down quietly and took the fourth set decisively by a score of 6–2. As they entered the ultimate fifth set both players knew the value of a single break. Federer faced two early fifth set crises when he found himself down double break point in the third and fifth games. Federer, however, saved all four break points to take a 3–2 lead. In the sixth game Federer finally broke the Nadal serve and closed out the championship 6–2 in the final set. This match marked the first time in Federer's career that he was pushed to a fifth set in the finals of a Slam and remained his only five set final victory at a major until 2009 Wimbledon. With this victory Federer tied Björn Borg's open-era men's record of five consecutive Wimbledon titles. He also tied Rod Laver and Björn Borg with 11 Grand Slam titles, moving into third place all-time.

=== Summer Hard Court Season ===
Federer began the hard-court season in August in Montreal at the Canadian Open as the defending champion. Federer advanced through the tournament without dropping a set and faced the young world no. 4 Novak Djokovic in the finals. Entering the final Federer had never lost to the young Serbian, holding a 4–0 record against him. The first set was a back and forth affair with Federer squandering triple set point on his own serve and losing the tiebreaker. Federer, however, ran away with the second set and forced a final set for the championship. Djokovic prevailed in a final-set tiebreaker, defeating Federer for the first time.

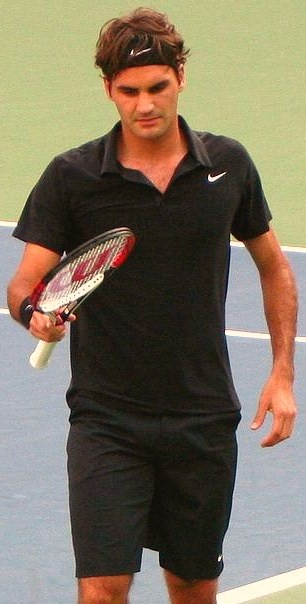
Federer at the 2007 US Open, where he won his fourth consecutive title.

The following week Federer entered the Cincinnati Masters. He reached the final, surviving a final-set tiebreaker scare against Lleyton Hewitt in the semifinals. Federer won the Cincinnati title for the second time, defeating James Blake in the final. The victory was Federer's 50th career singles title, his 14th ATP Masters Series title, and made him the winner of the 2007 US Open Series points race.

As the winner of U.S. Open Series, Federer had never entered the US Open in a stronger position. Federer lost the opening set in his third and fourth round matches before recovering to defeat John Isner and Feliciano López respectively. His quarterfinal match was especially compelling since it was a rematch of the 2006 final against Andy Roddick. Federer defeated Roddick in straight sets in a match that featured two tiebreakers. Federer reached the finals and faced rising star and world no. 3 Novak Djokovic who had defeated Federer just a few weeks prior in the finals of Montreal. Djokovic started the match hot and quickly found himself at triple set point on his own serve. Federer saved all set points and snatched the first set in a close tiebreaker (it was an exact reversal of the first set just weeks before in Montreal). Djokovic would not yield, however, and again took Federer to a tiebreaker in the second set. Federer again prevailed in the tiebreaker and capitalized on this by taking a close third set as well. Federer's victory over the third seed Djokovic delivered his 12th Grand Slam singles title, and fourth consecutive US Open title. This victory moved him ahead of Laver and Borg for third on the all-time list of Grand Slam champions. As champion of the US Open Series points race, Federer received a bonus of $1 million, in addition to the $1.4 million prize for winning the US Open singles title. He became the only player in history to win three Grand Slams in a year for three years (2004, 2006, 2007). Throughout the tournament the American press labeled him Darth Federer for his all-black attire and the tournament played The Imperial March from Star Wars when he was announced onto the court for each of his matches. The Imperial March was also played by the tournament officials after the final match point, in honor of Federer's achievement.

=== Fall Indoor Season ===
Federer began the indoor season as the defending champion at the Madrid Masters. Fresh off wins at the Cincinnati Masters and the US Open, Federer was the clear favorite to win the tournament. He advanced to the finals without dropping a set and faced his early career nemesis David Nalbandian. Federer took the first set easily but was defeated in three sets by the red-hot Argentine. Notably, Nalbandian had consecutively beaten Nadal, Djokovic, and Federer in Madrid to claim his first masters title.

Federer next entered his home-town tournament in Basel as the defending champion. He dropped only one set en route to his second Basel title and his third title in his native Switzerland.

The last masters tournament of the year at Bercy was a brief affair for Federer who fell again to Nalbandian, this time in the third round. The streaking Argentine would go on to defeat Nadal in the finals of Bercy.

Federer then finished the season at the year-end Tennis Masters Cup. Despite losing for the first time in the round-robin group to Fernando González, he regrouped against Roddick and Davydenko to advance. Federer went on to defeat Nadal in the semifinals and David Ferrer in the tournament finals to win his fourth Tennis Masters Cup title, finishing the season in style.

== Season Accomplishments ==
Federer finished the year as the world no. 1 player for the fourth consecutive time, compiling an impressive 68–9 record. Due to his performance on the court and off-court personality, in 2007, Time magazine named him as one of the 100 most important persons in the world. Rod Laver, one of the greatest players ever himself, described him as follows: "One thing is for sure: he's the best player of his time and one of the most admirable champions on the planet. That's certainly something worth crowing over. The beauty is, Roger Federer won't.".

=== Matches ===
==== Grand Slam performance ====
Tournament	Round	Result	Opponent	Score
Australian Open	1R	Win	(Germany) Björn Phau	7–5, 6–0, 6–4
Australian Open	2R	Win	(Sweden) Jonas Björkman	6–2, 6–3, 6–2
Australian Open	3R	Win	(Russia) Mikhail Youzhny	6–3, 6–3, 7–6(5)
Australian Open	4R	Win	(Serbia) Novak Djokovic	6–2, 7–5, 6–3
Australian Open	QF	Win	(Spain) Tommy Robredo	6–3, 7–6(2), 7–5
Australian Open	SF	Win	(United States) Andy Roddick	6–4, 6–0, 6–2
Australian Open	F	Win (10)	(Chile) Fernando González	7–6(2), 6–4, 6–4
French Open	1R	Win	(United States) Michael Russell	6–4, 6–2, 6–4
French Open	2R	Win	(France) Thierry Ascione	6–1, 6–2, 7–6(8)
French Open	3R	Win	(Italy) Potito Starace	6–2, 6–3, 6–0
French Open	4R	Win	(Russia) Mikhail Youzhny	7–6(3), 6–4, 6–4
French Open	QF	Win	(Spain) Tommy Robredo	7–5, 1–6, 6–1, 6–2
French Open	SF	Win	(Russia) Nikolay Davydenko	7–5, 7–6(5), 7–6(7)
French Open	F	Loss	(Spain) Rafael Nadal	3–6, 6–4, 3–6, 4–6
Wimbledon	1R	Win	(Russia) Teymuraz Gabashvili	6–3, 6–2, 6–4
Wimbledon	2R	Win	(Argentina) Juan Martín del Potro	6–2, 7–5, 6–1
Wimbledon	3R	Win	(Russia) Marat Safin	6–1, 6–4, 7–6(4)
Wimbledon	4R	Win	(Germany) Tommy Haas	walkover
Wimbledon	QF	Win	(Spain) Juan Carlos Ferrero	7–6(2), 3–6, 6–1, 6–3
Wimbledon	SF	Win	(France) Richard Gasquet	7–5, 6–3, 6–4
Wimbledon	F	Win (11)	(Spain) Rafael Nadal	7–6(7), 4–6, 7–6(3), 2–6, 6–2
US Open	1R	Win	(United States) Scoville Jenkins	6–3, 6–2, 6–4
US Open	2R	Win	(Chile) Paul Capdeville	6–1, 6–4, 6–4
US Open	3R	Win	(United States) John Isner	6–7(4), 6–2, 6–4, 6–2
US Open	4R	Win	(Spain) Feliciano López	3–6, 6–4, 6–1, 6–4
US Open	QF	Win	(United States) Andy Roddick	7–6(5), 7–6(4), 6–2
US Open	SF	Win	(Russia) Nikolay Davydenko	7–5, 6–1, 7–5
US Open	F	Win (12)	(Serbia) Novak Djokovic	7–6(4), 7–6(2), 6–4

==== All matches ====
Match	Tournament	Start; Date	Type	I/O	Surface	Round	Opponent	Rank	Result	Score
609	(Australia) Australian Open	1/15	GS	Outdoor	Hard	R128	(Germany) Björn Phau	#82	W	7–5, 6–0, 6–4
610	(Australia) Australian Open	1/15	GS	Outdoor	Hard	R64	(Sweden) Jonas Björkman	#50	W	6–2, 6–3, 6–2
611	(Australia) Australian Open	1/15	GS	Outdoor	Hard	R32	(Russia) Mikhail Youzhny	#25	W	6–3, 6–3, 7–6(5)
612	(Australia) Australian Open	1/15	GS	Outdoor	Hard	R16	(Serbia) Novak Djokovic	#15	W	6–2, 7–5, 6–3
613	(Australia) Australian Open	1/15	GS	Outdoor	Hard	Q	(Spain) Tommy Robredo	#6	W	6–3, 7–6(2), 7–5
614	(Australia) Australian Open	1/15	GS	Outdoor	Hard	S	(United States) Andy Roddick	#7	W	6–4, 6–0, 6–2
615	(Australia) Australian Open	1/15	GS	Outdoor	Hard	Win (1)	(Chile) Fernando González	#9	W	7–6(2), 6–4, 6–4
616	(United Arab Emirates) Dubai	2/26	500	Outdoor	Hard	R32	(Denmark) Kristian Pless	#86	W	7–6(2), 3–6, 6–3
617	(United Arab Emirates) Dubai	2/26	500	Outdoor	Hard	R16	(Italy) Daniele Bracciali	#88	W	7–5, 6–3
618	(United Arab Emirates) Dubai	2/26	500	Outdoor	Hard	Q	(Serbia) Novak Djokovic (2)	#14	W	6–3, 6–7(6), 6–3
619	(United Arab Emirates) Dubai	2/26	500	Outdoor	Hard	S	(Germany) Tommy Haas	#9	W	6–4, 7–5
620	(United Arab Emirates) Dubai	2/26	500	Outdoor	Hard	Win (2)	(Russia) Mikhail Youzhny (2)	#18	W	6–4, 6–3
–	(United States) Indian Wells Masters	3/5	1000	Outdoor	Hard	R128	Bye	N/A		
621	(United States) Indian Wells Masters	3/5	1000	Outdoor	Hard	R64	(Argentina) Guillermo Cañas	#60	L	5–7, 2–6
–	(United States) Miami Masters	3/19	1000	Outdoor	Hard	R128	Bye	N/A		
622	(United States) Miami Masters	3/19	1000	Outdoor	Hard	R64	(United States) Sam Querrey	#69	W	6–4, 6–3
623	(United States) Miami Masters	3/19	1000	Outdoor	Hard	R32	(Spain) Nicolás Almagro	#34	W	7–5, 6–3
624	(United States) Miami Masters	3/19	1000	Outdoor	Hard	R16	(Argentina) Guillermo Cañas (2)	#55	L	6–7(2), 6–2, 6–7(5)
–	(Monaco) Monte Carlo Masters	4/15	1000	Outdoor	Clay	R64	Bye	N/A		
625	(Monaco) Monte Carlo Masters	4/15	1000	Outdoor	Clay	R32	(Italy) Andreas Seppi	#101	W	7–6(4), 7–6(6)
626	(Monaco) Monte Carlo Masters	4/15	1000	Outdoor	Clay	R16	(South Korea) Lee Hyung-taik	#49	W	6–4, 6–3
627	(Monaco) Monte Carlo Masters	4/15	1000	Outdoor	Clay	Q	(Spain) David Ferrer	#16	W	6–4, 6–0
628	(Monaco) Monte Carlo Masters	4/15	1000	Outdoor	Clay	S	(Spain) Juan Carlos Ferrero	#21	W	6–3, 6–4
629	(Monaco) Monte Carlo Masters	4/15	1000	Outdoor	Clay	F	(Spain) Rafael Nadal	#2	L	4–6, 4–6
–	(Italy) Rome Masters	5/7	1000	Outdoor	Clay	R64	Bye	N/A		
630	(Italy) Rome Masters	5/7	1000	Outdoor	Clay	R32	(Spain) Nicolás Almagro (2)	#40	W	6–3, 6–4
631	(Italy) Rome Masters	5/7	1000	Outdoor	Clay	R16	(Italy) Filippo Volandri	#53	L	2–6, 4–6
–	(Germany) Hamburg Masters	5/14	1000	Outdoor	Clay	R64	Bye	N/A		
632	(Germany) Hamburg Masters	5/14	1000	Outdoor	Clay	R32	(Argentina) Juan Mónaco	#48	W	6–3, 2–6, 6–4
633	(Germany) Hamburg Masters	5/14	1000	Outdoor	Clay	R16	(Spain) Juan Carlos Ferrero (2)	#19	W	6–2, 6–3
634	(Germany) Hamburg Masters	5/14	1000	Outdoor	Clay	Q	(Spain) David Ferrer (2)	#14	W	6–3, 4–6, 6–3
635	(Germany) Hamburg Masters	5/14	1000	Outdoor	Clay	S	(Spain) Carlos Moyá	#36	W	4–6, 6–4, 6–2
636	(Germany) Hamburg Masters	5/14	1000	Outdoor	Clay	Win (3)	(Spain) Rafael Nadal (2)	#2	W	2–6, 6–2, 6–0
637	(France) Roland Garros	5/28	GS	Outdoor	Clay	R128	(United States) Michael Russell	#68	W	6–4, 6–2, 6–4
638	(France) Roland Garros	5/28	GS	Outdoor	Clay	R64	(France) Thierry Ascione	#168	W	6–1, 6–2, 7–6(8)
639	(France) Roland Garros	5/28	GS	Outdoor	Clay	R32	(Italy) Potito Starace	#57	W	6–2, 6–3, 6–0
640	(France) Roland Garros	5/28	GS	Outdoor	Clay	R16	(Russia) Mikhail Youzhny (3)	#15	W	7–6(3), 6–4, 6–4
641	(France) Roland Garros	5/28	GS	Outdoor	Clay	Q	(Spain) Tommy Robredo	#9	W	7–5, 1–6, 6–1, 6–2
642	(France) Roland Garros	5/28	GS	Outdoor	Clay	S	(Russia) Nikolay Davydenko	#4	W	7–5, 7–6(5), 7–6(7)
643	(France) Roland Garros	5/28	GS	Outdoor	Clay	F	(Spain) Rafael Nadal (3)	#2	L	3–6, 6–4, 3–6, 4–6
644	(United Kingdom) Wimbledon	6/25	GS	Outdoor	Grass	R128	(Russia) Teymuraz Gabashvili	#86	W	6–3, 6–2, 6–4
645	(United Kingdom) Wimbledon	6/25	GS	Outdoor	Grass	R64	(Argentina) Juan Martín del Potro	#56	W	6–2, 7–5, 6–1
646	(United Kingdom) Wimbledon	6/25	GS	Outdoor	Grass	R32	(Russia) Marat Safin	#24	W	6–1, 6–4, 7–6(4)
–	(United Kingdom) Wimbledon	6/25	GS	Outdoor	Grass	R16	(Germany) Tommy Haas	#10	W/O	N/A
647	(United Kingdom) Wimbledon	6/25	GS	Outdoor	Grass	Q	(Spain) Juan Carlos Ferrero (3)	#18	W	7–6(2), 3–6, 6–1, 6–3
648	(United Kingdom) Wimbledon	6/25	GS	Outdoor	Grass	S	(France) Richard Gasquet	#14	W	7–5, 6–3, 6–4
649	(United Kingdom) Wimbledon	6/25	GS	Outdoor	Grass	Win (4)	(Spain) Rafael Nadal (4)	#2	W	7–6(7), 4–6, 7–6(3), 2–6, 6–2
–	Canada Masters	8/5	1000	Outdoor	Hard	R64	Bye	N/A		
650	Canada Masters	8/5	1000	Outdoor	Hard	R32	(Croatia) Ivo Karlović	#34	W	7–6(2), 7–6(3)
651	Canada Masters	8/5	1000	Outdoor	Hard	R16	(Italy) Fabio Fognini	#139	W	6–1, 6–1
652	Canada Masters	8/5	1000	Outdoor	Hard	Q	(Australia) Lleyton Hewitt	#21	W	6–3, 6–4
653	Canada Masters	8/5	1000	Outdoor	Hard	S	(Czech Republic) Radek Štěpánek	#60	W	7–6(6), 6–2
654	Canada Masters	8/5	1000	Outdoor	Hard	F	(Serbia) Novak Djokovic (3)	#4	L	6–7(2), 6–2, 6–7(2)
–	(United States) Cincinnati Masters	8/13	1000	Outdoor	Hard	R64	Bye	N/A		
655	(United States) Cincinnati Masters	8/13	1000	Outdoor	Hard	R32	(France) Julien Benneteau	#68	W	6–3, 6–3
656	(United States) Cincinnati Masters	8/13	1000	Outdoor	Hard	R16	(Cyprus) Marcos Baghdatis	#18	W	7–6(5), 7–5
657	(United States) Cincinnati Masters	8/13	1000	Outdoor	Hard	Q	(Spain) Nicolás Almagro (3)	#32	W	6–3, 3–6, 6–2
658	(United States) Cincinnati Masters	8/13	1000	Outdoor	Hard	S	(Australia) Lleyton Hewitt (2)	#20	W	6–3, 6–7(7), 7–6(1)
659	(United States) Cincinnati Masters	8/13	1000	Outdoor	Hard	Win (5)	(United States) James Blake	#8	W	6–1, 6–4
660	(United States) US Open	8/27	GS	Outdoor	Hard	R128	(United States) Scoville Jenkins	#319	W	6–3, 6–2, 6–4
661	(United States) US Open	8/27	GS	Outdoor	Hard	R64	(Chile) Paul Capdeville	#120	W	6–1, 6–4, 6–4
662	(United States) US Open	8/27	GS	Outdoor	Hard	R32	(United States) John Isner	#184	W	6–7(4), 6–2, 6–4, 6–2
663	(United States) US Open	8/27	GS	Outdoor	Hard	R16	(Spain) Feliciano López	#60	W	3–6, 6–4, 6–1, 6–4
664	(United States) US Open	8/27	GS	Outdoor	Hard	Q	(United States) Andy Roddick (2)	#5	W	7–6(5), 7–6(4), 6–2
665	(United States) US Open	8/27	GS	Outdoor	Hard	S	(Russia) Nikolay Davydenko (2)	#4	W	7–5, 6–1, 7–5
666	(United States) US Open	8/27	GS	Outdoor	Hard	Win (6)	(Serbia) Novak Djokovic (4)	#3	W	7–6(4), 7–6(2), 6–4
667	(Czech Republic) CZE v. SUI WG Play-offs	9/21	DC	Indoor	Carpet	RR	(Czech Republic) Radek Štěpánek (2)	#34	W	6–3, 6–2, 6–7(4), 7–6(5)
668	(Czech Republic) CZE v. SUI WG Play-offs	9/21	DC	Indoor	Carpet	RR	(Czech Republic) Tomáš Berdych	#10	W	7–6(5), 7–6(10), 6–3
–	(Spain) Madrid Masters	10/15	1000	Indoor	Hard	R64	Bye	N/A		
669	(Spain) Madrid Masters	10/15	1000	Indoor	Hard	R32	(United States) Robby Ginepri	#72	W	7–6(2), 6–4
670	(Spain) Madrid Masters	10/15	1000	Indoor	Hard	R16	(Argentina) Guillermo Cañas (3)	#14	W	6–0, 6–3
671	(Spain) Madrid Masters	10/15	1000	Indoor	Hard	Q	(Spain) Feliciano López (2)	#42	W	7–6(4), 6–4
672	(Spain) Madrid Masters	10/15	1000	Indoor	Hard	S	(Germany) Nicolas Kiefer	#112	W	6–4, 6–4
673	(Spain) Madrid Masters	10/15	1000	Indoor	Hard	F	(Argentina) David Nalbandian	#25	L	6–1, 3–6, 3–6
674	(Switzerland) Basel	10/22	250	Indoor	Hard	R32	(Germany) Michael Berrer	#56	W	6–1, 3–6, 6–3
675	(Switzerland) Basel	10/22	250	Indoor	Hard	R16	(Argentina) Juan Martín del Potro (2)	#49	W	6–1, 6–4
676	(Switzerland) Basel	10/22	250	Indoor	Hard	Q	(Germany) Nicolas Kiefer (2)	#64	W	6–3, 6–2
677	(Switzerland) Basel	10/22	250	Indoor	Hard	S	(Croatia) Ivo Karlović (2)	#25	W	7–6(6), 7–6(5)
678	(Switzerland) Basel	10/22	250	Indoor	Hard	Win (7)	(Finland) Jarkko Nieminen	#29	W	6–3, 6–4
–	(France) Paris Masters	10/28	1000	Indoor	Hard	R64	Bye	N/A		
679	(France) Paris Masters	10/28	1000	Indoor	Hard	R32	(Croatia) Ivo Karlović (3)	#24	W	6–3, 4–6, 6–3
680	(France) Paris Masters	10/28	1000	Indoor	Hard	R16	(Argentina) David Nalbandian (2)	#21	L	4–6, 6–7(3)
681	(China) Tennis Masters Cup	11/12	WC	Indoor	Hard	RR	(Chile) Fernando González (2)	#7	L	6–3, 6–7(1), 5–7
682	(China) Tennis Masters Cup	11/12	WC	Indoor	Hard	RR	(Russia) Nikolay Davydenko (3)	#4	W	6–4, 6–3
683	(China) Tennis Masters Cup	11/12	WC	Indoor	Hard	RR	(United States) Andy Roddick (3)	#5	W	6–4, 6–2
684	(China) Tennis Masters Cup	11/12	WC	Indoor	Hard	S	(Spain) Rafael Nadal (5)	#2	W	6–4, 6–1
685	(China) Tennis Masters Cup	11/12	WC	Indoor	Hard	Win (8)	(Spain) David Ferrer (3)	#6	W	6–2, 6–3, 6–2

=== Finals ===
==== Singles: 12 (8–4) ====
Legend Grand Slam (3–1) ATP World Tour Finals (1–0) ATP World Tour Masters 1000 (2–3) ATP World Tour 500 Series (1–0) ATP World Tour 250 Series (1–0)	Titles by surface Hard (6–2) Clay (1–2) Grass (1–0)	Titles by surface Outdoors (6–3) Indoors (2–1)

Outcome	No.	Date	Tournament	Surface	Opponent	Score
Winner	46.	28 January 2007	Australian Open, Australia (3)	Hard	(Chile) Fernando González	7–6^{(7–2)}, 6–4, 6–4
Winner	47.	7 March 2007	Dubai Tennis Championships, United Arab Emirates (4)	Hard	(Russia) Mikhail Youzhny	6–4, 6–3
Runner-up	14.	22 April 2007	Monte-Carlo Masters, France (2)	Clay	(Spain) Rafael Nadal	4–6, 4–6
Winner	48.	20 May 2007	Hamburg Masters, Germany (4)	Clay	(Spain) Rafael Nadal	2–6, 6–2, 6–0
Runner-up	15.	10 June 2007	French Open, France (2)	Clay	(Spain) Rafael Nadal	3–6, 6–4, 3–6, 4–6
Winner	49.	8 July 2007	Wimbledon, England, UK (5)	Grass	(Spain) Rafael Nadal	7–6^{(9–7)}, 4–6, 7–6^{(7–3)}, 2–6, 6–2
Runner-up	16.	12 August 2007	Canada Open, Canada	Hard	(Serbia) Novak Djokovic	6–7^{(2–7)}, 6–2, 6–7^{(2–7)}
Winner	50.	19 August 2007	Cincinnati Masters, United States (2)	Hard	(United States) James Blake	6–1, 6–4
Winner	51.	9 September 2007	US Open, United States (4)	Hard	(Serbia) Novak Djokovic	7–6^{(7–4)}, 7–6^{(7–2)}, 6–4
Runner-up	17.	21 October 2007	Madrid Open, Spain	Hard (i)	(Argentina) David Nalbandian	6–1, 3–6, 3–6
Winner	52.	28 October 2007	Swiss Indoors, Switzerland (2)	Hard (i)	(Finland) Jarkko Nieminen	6–3, 6–4
Winner	53.	18 November 2007	Year-End Championships, China (4)	Hard (i)	(Spain) David Ferrer	6–2, 6–3, 6–2

== Prize Money Earnings ==
Event	Prize money	Year-to-date
Australian Open	$1,004,560	$1,004,560
Dubai Duty Free Tennis Championships	$300,000	$1,304,560
Dubai Duty Free Tennis Championships (doubles)	$6,510	$1,311,070
Pacific Life Open	$9,000	$1,320,070
Pacific Life Open (doubles)	$5,300	$1,325,370
Sony Ericsson Open	$35,000	$1,360,370
Monte Carlo Masters	$200,000	$1,560,370
Internazionali BNL d'Italia	$25,000	$1,585,370
Internazionali BNL d'Italia (doubles)	$1,750	$1,587,120
Hamburg Masters	$400,000	$1,987,120
Hamburg Masters (doubles)	$1,750	$1,988,870
French Open	$671,775	$2,660,645
The Championships, Wimbledon	$1,399,175	$4,059,820
Rogers Cup	$200,000	$4,259,820
Rogers Cup (doubles)	$3,800	$4,263,620
Western & Southern Financial Group Masters	$400,000	$4,663,620
US Open	$2,400,000	$7,063,620
Mutua Madrilena Masters Madrid	$200,000	$7,263,620
Davidoff Swiss Indoors	$142,000	$7,405,620
BNP Paribas Masters	$25,000	$7,430,620
Tennis Masters Cup	$1,200,000	$8,630,620
		$10,130,620

== See also ==
- Roger Federer
- Roger Federer career statistics
