= 2007 Tennis Masters Cup =

- Date: November 11–18
- Edition: 38th (singles) / 33rd (doubles)
- Category: Masters Cup
- Draw: 8S / 8D
- Prize money: $3,800,000
- Surface: Hard / indoor
- Location: Shanghai, China
- Venue: Qizhong Forest Sports City Arena

Champions

Singles
- (Switzerland) Roger Federer

Doubles
- (The Bahamas) Mark Knowles / (Canada) Daniel Nestor
- ATP Finals

The 2007 Tennis Masters Cup was a men's tennis tournament played on indoor hard courts. It was the 38th edition of the year-end singles championships, the 33rd edition of the year-end doubles championships, and was part of the 2007 ATP Tour. It took place at the Qizhong Forest Sports City Arena in Shanghai, China, from November 11 through November 18, 2007. Roger Federer won the singles title.

== Finals ==
=== Singles ===
(Switzerland) Roger Federer defeated (Spain) David Ferrer 6–2, 6–3, 6–2

- It was Federer's 8th title of the year, and his 53rd overall. It was his 4th year-end championships title, and his 2nd consecutive one.

=== Doubles ===
(The Bahamas) Mark Knowles / (Canada) Daniel Nestor defeated (Sweden) Simon Aspelin / (Austria) Julian Knowle 6–2, 6–3

== Points and prize money ==
Stage	Singles	Doubles^{1}	Points
Champion	RR + $800,000	RR +$125,000	RR + 450
Runner-up	RR + $300,000	RR +$25,000	RR + 200
Round robin win per match	$100,000	$15,000	100
Participation fee	$100,000^{2}	$50,000^{3}	–

- RR is points or prize money won in the round robin stage.
- ^{1} Prize money for doubles is per team.
- ^{2} Pro-rated on a per-match basis: $50,000 = 1 match, $75,000 = 2 matches, $100,000 = 3 matches
- ^{3} 3 Pro-rated on a per-match basis: $20,000 = 1 match, $35,000 = 2 matches, $50,000 = 3 matches
- An undefeated singles champion would earn the maximum 750 points and $1,200,000 in prize money ($100,000 participation, $300,000 undefeated round robin, $300,000 semifinal win, $500,000 final win)
- An undefeated doubles champion would earn the maximum 750 points and $220,000 in prize money ($50,000 participation, $45,000 undefeated round robin, $25,000 semifinal win, $100,000 final win). While each of them would get 1,500 points, the $220,000 would be split, so $110,000 for each member of the team.

== Points breakdown ==
=== Singles ===
Rank	Player	Grand Slam				ATP World Tour Masters 1000									Best Other					Total points	Tourn
Rank	Player	AUS	FRA	WIM	USO	IW	MIA	MC	ROM	HAM	CAN	CIN	MAD	PAR	1	2	3	4	5	Total points	Tourn
1	(Switzerland) Roger Federer	W 200	F 140	W 200	W 200	R64; 1	R16; 15	F 70	R16; 15	W 100	F 70	W 100	F 70	R16; 15	W 60	W 50				1,306	15
2	(Spain) Rafael Nadal	QF; 50	W 200	F 140	R16; 30	W 100	QF; 25	W 100	W 100	F 70	SF; 45	R32; 1	QF; 25	F 70	W 60	W 50	SF; 15	QF; 15	QF; 11	1,107	18
3	(Serbia) Novak Djokovic	R16; 30	SF; 90	SF; 90	F 140	F 70	W 100	R16; 15	QF; 25	QF; 25	W 100	R32; 1	SF; 45	R32; 1	W 50	W 40	W 35	SF; 22	QF; 15	894	21
4	(Russia) Nikolay Davydenko	QF; 50	SF; 90	R16; 30	SF; 90	R16; 15	R32; 7	R32; 1	SF; 45	R16; 15	QF; 25	SF; 45	A 0	R16; 15	W 50	SF; 22	SF; 22	QF; 15	QF; 8	545	25
5	(United States) Andy Roddick	SF; 90	R128; 1	QF; 50	QF; 50	SF; 45	QF; 25	A 0	R16; 15	A 0	QF; 25	R16; 15	A 0	A 0	W 45	W 40	F 35	SF; 15	SF; 15	466	19
6	(Spain) David Ferrer	R16; 30	R32; 15	R64; 7	SF; 90	QF; 25	4R; 15	QF; 25	R64; 1	QF; 25	R32; 7	QF; 25	R32; 1	QF; 25	W 50	W 35	W 35	SF; 27	QF; 12	450	22
7	(Chile) Fernando González	F 140	R128; 1	R32; 15	R128; 1	R16; 15	R32; 7	R32; 1	F 70	QF; 25	R32; 1	R32; 1	QF; 25	R32; 1	W 35	QF; 12	QF; 12	QF; 11	QF; 8	381	24
8	(France) Richard Gasquet	R16; 30	R64; 7	SF; 90	R64; 7	R16; 15	R32; 7	QF; 25	R32; 7	R32; 7	R32; 1	R32; 1	R32; 1	SF; 45	W 35	F 35	F 28	SF; 15	QF; 10	366	22

=== Doubles ===
Rk	Name	1	2	3	4	5	6	7	8	9	10	11	12	13	14	Total	Tour
—	(United States) Bob Bryan (United States) Mike Bryan	W 200	F 140	W 100	W 100	W 100	W 100	W 100	F 70	F 70	QF; 50	QF; 50	W 50	SF; 45	W 40	1,215	22
1	(The Bahamas) Mark Knowles (Canada) Daniel Nestor	W 200	SF; 90	QF; 50	QF; 50	SF; 45	W 45	SF; 27	F 28	QF; 25	QF; 25	QF; 25	F 24	F 24	QF; 15	672	19
2	(Australia) Paul Hanley (Zimbabwe) Kevin Ullyett	SF; 90	SF; 90	F 70	F 70	SF; 45	W 35	SF; 27	QF; 25	QF; 25	QF; 25	QF; 25	QF; 25	SF; 22	SF; 20	594	21
3	(Sweden) Simon Aspelin (Austria) Julian Knowle	W 200	W 45	SF; 45	SF; 45	SF; 45	W 35	W 35	R16; 30	QF; 25	QF; 25	SF; 22	SF; 15	QF; 12	QF; 12	591	19
4	(Czech Republic) Martin Damm (India) Leander Paes	W 100	F 70	W 50	QF; 50	SF; 45	SF; 45	F 35	R16; 30	SF; 27	QF; 25	F 24	SF; 20	SF; 18	SF; 15	554	19
5	(Czech Republic) Lukáš Dlouhý (Czech Republic) Pavel Vízner	F 140	F 140	QF; 50	SF; 45	W 35	F 35	QF; 25	SF; 22	SF; 15	R32; 15	QF; 12	QF; 8	R32; 0	R16; 0	542	15
6	(Sweden) Jonas Björkman (Belarus) Max Mirnyi	F 140	QF; 50	W 45	SF; 45	SF; 45	R16; 30	QF; 25	QF; 25	QF; 25	QF; 25	QF; 25	SF; 20	QF; 12	R64; 0	512	17
7	(France) Arnaud Clément (France) Michaël Llodra	W 200	SF; 45	SF; 45	W 40	W 35	F 31	R16; 30	R32; 15	R16; 15	R16; 15	SF; 15	QF; 8	R32; 0	R64; 0	494	14
8	(Israel) Jonathan Erlich (Israel) Andy Ram	W 100	F 70	SF; 45	SF; 45	R16; 30	R16; 30	R16; 30	F 28	SF; 27	F 24	SF; 20	SF; 15	SF; 15	R32; 15	494	26
