= 2007 Open 13 – Singles =

Singles
- 2007 Open 13

Final
- Champion: (France) Gilles Simon
- Runner-up: (Cyprus) Marcos Baghdatis
- Score: 6–4, 7–6^{(7–3)}

Details
- Draw: 32 (4Q / 3WC)
- Seeds: 8

Events
Singles	Doubles
← 2006 ·	Open 13	· 2008 →

The 2007 Open 13 was a men's tennis tournament played on indoor hard courts in Marseille, France, the event was part of the 2007 ATP Tour The tournament was held from February 12 to 18, 2007. Gilles Simon defeated Marcos Baghdatis 6–4, 7–6^{(7–3)}.

== Seeds ==
1. (Russia) Nikolay Davydenko (first round)
2. (Croatia) Ivan Ljubičić (first round)
3. (Croatia) Mario Ančić (first round, retired)
4. (Serbia) Novak Djokovic (first round)
5. (Spain) David Ferrer (second round)
6. (France) Richard Gasquet (quarterfinals)
7. (Cyprus) Marcos Baghdatis (final)
8. (Australia) Lleyton Hewitt (second round, retired)

== Draws ==
=== Key ===
- Q = Qualifier
- WC = Wild card
- LL = Lucky loser
- Alt = Alternate
- SE = Special exempt
- PR = Protected ranking
- ITF = ITF entry
- JE = Junior exempt
- w/o = Walkover
- r = Retired
- d = Defaulted
- SR = Special ranking

=== Finals ===
Semifinals					Finals
	(Sweden) Robin Söderling	2	6^{2}
	(France) Gilles Simon	6	7^{7}			(France) Gilles Simon	6	7^{7}
7	(Cyprus) Marcos Baghdatis	3	6	6	7	(Cyprus) Marcos Baghdatis	4	6^{3}
	(Finland) Jarkko Nieminen	6	3	2

=== Section 1 ===
First round
1	(Russia) N Davydenko	6	4	1
(Sweden) R Söderling	3	6	6
LL	(Switzerland) G Bastl	6	5	3
(Sweden) T Johansson	4	7	6
(France) G Monfils	6	6^{1}	5
(France) M Gicquel	4	7^{7}	7
(Czech Republic) J Hernych	1	5
6	(France) R Gasquet	6	7
3	(Croatia) M Ančić	0^{r}
(Italy) A Seppi	4
(Italy) D Bracciali	3	2
(Sweden) J Björkman	6	6
(France) G Simon	6	6
Q	(Netherlands) J Huta Galung	1	1
WC	(France) M Llodra	6	1	4
8	(Australia) L Hewitt	4	6	6

Second round
(Sweden) R Söderling	6	7
(Sweden) T Johansson	4	5
(France) M Gicquel	6^{2}	2
6	(France) R Gasquet	7^{7}	6
(Italy) A Seppi	1	0
(Sweden) J Björkman	6	6
(France) G Simon	6	3
8	(Australia) L Hewitt	1	2^{r}

Quarterfinals
(Sweden) R Söderling	6	7^{7}
6	(France) R Gasquet	1	6^{4}
(Sweden) J Björkman	6^{4}	2
(France) G Simon	7^{7}	6

Semifinals
(Sweden) R Söderling	2	6^{2}
(France) G Simon	6	7^{7}

=== Section 2 ===
First round
7	(Cyprus) M Baghdatis	6	6
(Serbia) J Tipsarević	3	4
WC	(France) D Guez	4	2
Q	(France) C Saulnier	6	6
(Spain) F Verdasco	3	2^{r}
(France) F Santoro	6	3
(Russia) M Youzhny	6	4	7^{7}
4	(Serbia) N Djokovic	4	6	6^{0}
5	(Spain) D Ferrer	6	6
(France) A Clément	4	4
(France) F Serra	6	1	2
WC	(France) J Benneteau	2	6	6
(Finland) J Nieminen	6^{1}	7^{7}	7^{8}
WC	(France) J Chardy	7^{7}	6^{4}	6^{6}
Q	(France) N Mahut	6	6
2	(Croatia) I Ljubičić	4	4

Second round
7	(Cyprus) M Baghdatis	6	6
Q	(France) C Saulnier	4	3
(France) F Santoro	7^{7}	2	3
(Russia) M Youzhny	6^{4}	6	6
5	(Spain) D Ferrer	6	0	1
WC	(France) J Benneteau	4	6	6
(Finland) J Nieminen	6	3	6
Q	(France) N Mahut	4	6	3

Quarterfinals
7	(Cyprus) M Baghdatis	2	7^{9}	7
(Russia) M Youzhny	6	6^{7}	5
WC	(France) J Benneteau	2	6	3
(Finland) J Nieminen	6	1	6

Semifinals
7	(Cyprus) M Baghdatis	3	6	6
(Finland) J Nieminen	6	3	2
