= 2007 Open 13 – Doubles =

Doubles
- 2007 Open 13

Final
- Champions: (France) Arnaud Clément (France) Michaël Llodra
- Runners-up: (The Bahamas) Mark Knowles (Canada) Daniel Nestor
- Score: 7–5, 4–6, [10–8]

Events
Singles	Doubles
← 2006 ·	Open 13	· 2008 →

Martin Damm and Radek Štěpánek were the defending champions. Damm did not participate this year. Štěpánek partnered with Mahesh Bhupathi, but withdrew from the first round.

Arnaud Clément and Michaël Llodra won in the final 7–5, 4–6, [10–8], against Mark Knowles and Daniel Nestor.

== Seeds ==
1. (The Bahamas) Mark Knowles / (Canada) Daniel Nestor (final)
2. (France) Fabrice Santoro / (Serbia) Nenad Zimonjić (first round)
3. (Israel) Jonathan Erlich / (Israel) Andy Ram (withdrew)
4. (France) Arnaud Clément / (France) Michaël Llodra (champions)

== Draw ==
=== Key ===
- Q = Qualifier
- WC = Wild card
- LL = Lucky loser
- Alt = Alternate
- SE = Special exempt
- PR = Protected ranking
- ITF = ITF entry
- JE = Junior exempt
- w/o = Walkover
- r = Retired
- d = Defaulted
- SR = Special ranking

=== Draw ===
First round
1	(The Bahamas) M Knowles (Canada) D Nestor	6	6
(South Africa) J Coetzee (Netherlands) R Wassen	4	3
(Germany) C Kas (Austria) O Marach	w/o
(France) M Gicquel (France) S Grosjean
Alt	(France) D Guez (France) A Sidorenko	4	6	[10]
(Croatia) I Ljubičić (Croatia) L Zovko	6	4	[12]
(Czech Republic) J Hernych (Russia) M Youzhny	3	4
(Serbia) N Djokovic (Serbia) J Tipsarević	6	6
(Finland) J Nieminen (Sweden) R Söderling	6^{6}	6	[10]
(Czech Republic) P Pála (Czech Republic) D Škoch	7^{8}	2	[2]
(India) M Bhupathi (Czech Republic) R Štěpánek
4	(France) A Clément (France) M Llodra	w/o
WC	(France) S de Chaunac (France) G Simon	6	1	[10]
WC	(France) J Eysseric (France) C Saulnier	4	6	[7]
(Switzerland) Y Allegro (France) N Mahut	6^{5}	7	[14]
2	(France) F Santoro (Serbia) N Zimonjić	7^{7}	5	[12]

Quarterfinals
1	(The Bahamas) M Knowles (Canada) D Nestor	6	6
(Germany) C Kas (Austria) O Marach	4	3
(Croatia) I Ljubičić (Croatia) L Zovko	7^{7}	6
(Serbia) N Djokovic (Serbia) J Tipsarević	6^{5}	3
(Finland) J Nieminen (Sweden) R Söderling	2	3
4	(France) A Clément (France) M Llodra	6	6
WC	(France) S de Chaunac (France) G Simon	4	2
(Switzerland) Y Allegro (France) N Mahut	6	6

Semifinals
1	(The Bahamas) M Knowles (Canada) D Nestor	6	6
(Croatia) I Ljubičić (Croatia) L Zovko	1	3
4	(France) A Clément (France) M Llodra	7^{9}	7
(Switzerland) Y Allegro (France) N Mahut	6^{7}	5

Final
1	(The Bahamas) M Knowles (Canada) D Nestor	5	6	[8]
4	(France) A Clément (France) M Llodra	7	4	[10]
