= 2007 Pacific Life Open – Women's doubles =

Women's doubles
- 2007 Pacific Life Open

Final
- Champion: (United States) Lisa Raymond (Australia) Samantha Stosur
- Runner-up: (Chinese Taipei) Chan Yung-jan (Chinese Taipei) Chuang Chia-jung
- Score: 6-3, 7-5

Events
Singles	men	women
Doubles	men	women
← 2006 ·	Pacific Life Open	· 2008 →

Lisa Raymond and Samantha Stosur were the defending women's doubles champions at the 2007 Pacific Life Open tennis tournament played at the Indian Wells Tennis Garden in Indian Wells, California, USA. They were seeded first of the 16 doubles teams that participated and extended their title by beating Chan Yung-jan and Chuang Chia-jung 6–3, 7–5 in the final.

== Seeds ==
1. (United States) Lisa Raymond / (Australia) Samantha Stosur (champions)
2. (China) Yan Zi / (China) Zheng Jie (quarterfinals)
3. (Spain) Virginia Ruano Pascual / (Argentina) Paola Suárez (second round)
4. (France) Nathalie Dechy / (Russia) Vera Zvonareva (semifinals)
5. (Chinese Taipei) Chan Yung-jan / (Chinese Taipei) Chuang Chia-jung (final)
6. (Russia) Elena Likhovtseva / (Spain) Anabel Medina Garrigues (quarterfinals)
7. (Slovakia) Janette Husárová / (United States) Meghann Shaughnessy (first round)
8. (United States) Vania King / (Israel) Shahar Pe'er (quarterfinals)

== Draw ==
=== Key ===
- Q = Qualifier
- WC = Wild card
- LL = Lucky loser
- Alt = Alternate
- SE = Special exempt
- PR = Protected ranking
- ITF = ITF entry
- JE = Junior exempt
- w/o = Walkover
- r = Retired
- d = Defaulted
- SR = Special ranking

=== Final ===
Semifinals
1	(United States) Lisa Raymond (Australia) Samantha Stosur	6	6
(Czech Republic) Renata Voráčová (Czech Republic) Lucie Hradecká	2	3
4	(France) Nathalie Dechy (Russia) Vera Zvonareva	4	4
5	(Chinese Taipei) Chan Yung-jan (Chinese Taipei) Chuang Chia-jung	6	6

Final
1	(United States) Lisa Raymond (Australia) Samantha Stosur	6	7
5	(Chinese Taipei) Chan Yung-jan (Chinese Taipei) Chuang Chia-jung	3	5

=== Earlier rounds ===
==== Top half ====
First round
1	(United States) L Raymond (Australia) S Stosur	6	6
WC	(Belarus) Victoria Azarenka (Russia) Anna Chakvetadze	3	4
(Ukraine) Y Fedak (Russia) A Kudryavtseva	7	7
(United States) C Gullickson (Australia) B Stewart	5	5
(Finland) E Laine (Czech Republic) V Uhlířová	2	6	[10]
(Spain) L Domínguez Lino (Italy) F Pennetta	6	3	[7]
(France) S Brémond (Japan) A Sugiyama	2	6^{2}
8	(United States) V King (Israel) S Pe'er	6	7^{7}
3	(Spain) V Ruano Pascual (Argentina) P Suárez	6	6
(Czech Republic) G Návratilová (Czech Republic) H Šromová	1	3
WC	(Russia) D Safina (Czech Republic) N Vaidišová	4	6	[10]
(France) É Loit (Australia) N Pratt	6	2	[7]
(Slovakia) J Gajdošová (Japan) A Morigami	6^{5}	2
(Ukraine) A Bondarenko (Ukraine) K Bondarenko	7^{7}	6
(Czech Republic) R Voráčová (Czech Republic) L Hradecká	6	6
7	(Slovakia) J Husárová (United States) M Shaughnessy	3	2

Second round
1	(United States) L Raymond (Australia) S Stosur	6	6
(Ukraine) Y Fedak (Russia) A Kudryavtseva	0	3
(Finland) E Laine (Czech Republic) V Uhlířová	0	1
8	(United States) V King (Israel) S Pe'er	6	6
3	(Spain) V Ruano Pascual (Argentina) P Suárez	6	6
WC	(Russia) D Safina (Czech Republic) N Vaidišová	4	4
(Ukraine) A Bondarenko (Ukraine) K Bondarenko	6	2	[7]
(Czech Republic) R Voráčová (Czech Republic) L Hradecká	3	6	[10]

Quarterfinals
1	(United States) L Raymond (Australia) S Stosur	6	6
8	(United States) V King (Israel) S Pe'er	0	2
3	(Spain) V Ruano Pascual (Argentina) P Suárez	6	4	[6]
(Czech Republic) R Voráčová (Czech Republic) L Hradecká	4	6	[10]

Semifinals
1	(United States) L Raymond (Australia) S Stosur	6	6
(Czech Republic) R Voráčová (Czech Republic) L Hradecká	2	3

==== Bottom half ====
First round
6	(Russia) E Likhovtseva (Spain) A Medina Garrigues	7^{7}	7^{7}
(Australia) A Molik (Russia) N Petrova	6^{4}	6^{4}
WC	(United States) C Morariu (Denmark) C Wozniacki	6	6
(Serbia) J Janković (United States) B Mattek	4	4
(United States) J Craybas (Russia) A Jidkova	2	7^{7}	[8]
(Italy) T Garbin (Netherlands) M Krajicek	6	6^{5}	[10]
(France) M Bartoli (United States) M Tu	3	6^{1}
4	(France) N Dechy (Russia) V Zvonareva	6	7^{7}
5	(Chinese Taipei) Y-j Chan (Chinese Taipei) C-j Chuang	6	4	[10]
(United States) A Harkleroad (Russia) G Voskoboeva	1	6	[7]
(Romania) A Ehritt-Vanc (Russia) A Rodionova	5	1
(Czech Republic) I Benešová (Czech Republic) B Záhlavová-Strýcová	7	6
(Italy) F Schiavone (Italy) R Vinci	6^{2}	2
(Italy) ME Camerin (Argentina) G Dulko	7^{7}	6
(China) S Peng (China) T Sun	6^{2}	4
2	(China) Z Yan (China) J Zheng	7^{7}	6

Second round
6	(Russia) E Likhovtseva (Spain) A Medina Garrigues	6	6
WC	(United States) C Morariu (Denmark) C Wozniacki	3	1
(Italy) T Garbin (Netherlands) M Krajicek	4	3
4	(France) N Dechy (Russia) V Zvonareva	6	6
5	(Chinese Taipei) Y-j Chan (Chinese Taipei) C-j Chuang	6	5	[10]
(Czech Republic) I Benešová (Czech Republic) B Záhlavová-Strýcová	3	7	[7]
(Italy) ME Camerin (Argentina) G Dulko	3	3
2	(China) Z Yan (China) J Zheng	6	6

Quarterfinals
6	(Russia) E Likhovtseva (Spain) A Medina Garrigues	7^{7}	3	[7]
4	(France) N Dechy (Russia) V Zvonareva	6^{5}	6	[10]
5	(Chinese Taipei) Y-j Chan (Chinese Taipei) C-j Chuang	6	6
2	(China) Z Yan (China) J Zheng	2	2

Semifinals
4	(France) N Dechy (Russia) V Zvonareva	4	4
5	(Chinese Taipei) Y-j Chan (Chinese Taipei) C-j Chuang	6	6
