= 2007 BNP Paribas Masters – Doubles =

Doubles
- 2007 BNP Paribas Masters

Final
- Champions: (United States) Bob Bryan (United States) Mike Bryan
- Runners-up: (Canada) Daniel Nestor (Serbia) Nenad Zimonjić
- Score: 6–3, 7–6^{(7–4)}

Details
- Draw: 24
- Seeds: 8

Events
Singles	Doubles
← 2006 ·	BNP Paribas Masters	· 2008 →

Arnaud Clément and Michaël Llodra were the defending champions, but lost in the semifinals to Daniel Nestor and Nenad Zimonjić.

Bob Bryan and Mike Bryan won in the final 6–3, 7–6^{(7–4)} against Nenad Zimonjić and Daniel Nestor.

== Seeds ==
All seeds received a bye into the second round.

1. (United States) Bob Bryan / (United States) Mike Bryan (champions)
2. (Serbia) Nenad Zimonjić / (Canada) Daniel Nestor (final)
3. (Sweden) Jonas Björkman / (Belarus) Max Mirnyi (quarterfinals)
4. (France) Fabrice Santoro / (The Bahamas) Mark Knowles (second round)
5. (Czech Republic) Lukáš Dlouhý / (Czech Republic) Pavel Vízner (quarterfinals)
6. (Sweden) Simon Aspelin / (Austria) Julian Knowle (semifinals)
7. (Australia) Paul Hanley / (Zimbabwe) Kevin Ullyett (quarterfinals)
8. (France) Arnaud Clément / (France) Michaël Llodra (semifinals)

== Draw ==
=== Key ===
- Q = Qualifier
- WC = Wild card
- LL = Lucky loser
- Alt = Alternate
- SE = Special exempt
- PR = Protected ranking
- ITF = ITF entry
- JE = Junior exempt
- w/o = Walkover
- r = Retired
- d = Defaulted
- SR = Special ranking

=== Finals ===
Semifinals
1	(United States) Bob Bryan (United States) Mike Bryan	6	6
6	(Sweden) Simon Aspelin (Austria) Julian Knowle	3	4
8	(France) Arnaud Clément (France) Michaël Llodra	4	4
2	(Canada) Daniel Nestor (Serbia) Nenad Zimonjić	6	6

Final
1	(United States) Bob Bryan (United States) Mike Bryan	6	7
2	(Canada) Daniel Nestor (Serbia) Nenad Zimonjić	3	6^{4}

=== Top half ===
First round
(Czech Republic) M Damm (India) L Paes	6	6^{5}	[9]
(South Africa) J Coetzee (Netherlands) R Wassen	3	7	[11]
(United States) E Butorac (Czech Republic) F Čermák	7	2	[11]
(Israel) J Erlich (Israel) A Ram	6^{1}	6	[9]
(Australia) J Kerr (Brazil) A Sá	6	2	[11]
(United Kingdom) A Murray (United Kingdom) J Murray	1	6	[9]
(France) P-H Mathieu (Finland) J Nieminen	7	4	[10]
WC	(France) M Gicquel (France) G Simon	6^{5}	6	[4]

Second round
1	(United States) B Bryan (United States) M Bryan	4	6	[10]
(South Africa) J Coetzee (Netherlands) R Wassen	6	2	[7]
(United States) E Butorac (Czech Republic) F Čermák	3	5
5	(Czech Republic) L Dlouhý (Czech Republic) P Vízner	6	7
4	(France) F Santoro (The Bahamas) M Knowles	3	3
(Australia) J Kerr (Brazil) A Sá	6	6
(France) P-H Mathieu (Finland) J Nieminen	6	6^{6}	[8]
6	(Sweden) S Aspelin (Austria) J Knowle	3	7	[10]

Quarterfinals
1	(United States) B Bryan (United States) M Bryan	4	7	[10]
5	(Czech Republic) L Dlouhý (Czech Republic) P Vízner	6	6^{2}	[8]
(Australia) J Kerr (Brazil) A Sá	6^{3}	3
6	(Sweden) S Aspelin (Austria) J Knowle	7	6

Semifinals
1	(United States) B Bryan (United States) M Bryan	6	6
6	(Sweden) S Aspelin (Austria) J Knowle	3	4

=== Bottom half ===
First round
WC	(France) S Grosjean (France) J-W Tsonga	7	6
(Switzerland) Y Allegro (Sweden) R Lindstedt	5	2
(Spain) F López (Spain) R Nadal	2	6	[6]
(Austria) J Melzer (Australia) T Perry	6	3	[10]
(France) J Benneteau (France) N Mahut	4	2
(Argentina) G Cañas (Chile) F González	6	6
(Poland) M Fyrstenberg (Poland) M Matkowski	6	7
(France) J Haehnel (France) É Roger-Vasselin	4	5

Second round
8	(France) A Clément (France) M Llodra	3	7	[10]
WC	(France) S Grosjean (France) J-W Tsonga	6	6^{5}	[8]
(Austria) J Melzer (Australia) T Perry	5	1
3	(Sweden) J Björkman (Belarus) M Mirnyi	7	6
7	(Australia) P Hanley (Zimbabwe) K Ullyett	7	4	[10]
(Argentina) G Cañas (Chile) F González	6^{5}	6	[8]
(Poland) M Fyrstenberg (Poland) M Matkowski	3	4
2	(Canada) D Nestor (Serbia) N Zimonjić	6	6

Quarterfinals
8	(France) A Clément (France) M Llodra	6	6
3	(Sweden) J Björkman (Belarus) M Mirnyi	2	2
7	(Australia) P Hanley (Zimbabwe) K Ullyett	6^{5}	3
2	(Canada) D Nestor (Serbia) N Zimonjić	7	6

Semifinals
8	(France) A Clément (France) M Llodra	4	4
2	(Canada) D Nestor (Serbia) N Zimonjić	6	6
