= 2007 Open 13 =

- Date: 12–18 February
- Edition: 15th
- Category: International Series
- Draw: 32S / 16D
- Prize money: $575,000
- Surface: Hard / indoor
- Location: Marseille, France

Champions

Singles
- (France) Gilles Simon

Doubles
- (France) Arnaud Clément / (France) Michaël Llodra
- Open 13

The 2007 Open 13 was a men's tennis tournament played on indoor hard courts in Marseille, France. The event was part of the ATP International Series category of the 2007 ATP Tour. It was the 15th edition of the tournament and was held from 12 February through 18 February 2007. Gilles Simon won the singles title.

== Finals ==
=== Singles ===
(France) Gilles Simon defeated (Cyprus) Marcos Baghdatis, 6–4, 7–6^{(7–3)}

- It was Simon's first title of the year and of his career

=== Doubles ===
(France) Arnaud Clément / (France) Michaël Llodra defeated (The Bahamas) Mark Knowles / (Canada) Daniel Nestor, 7–5, 4–6, [10–8]
