= 2007 Pacific Life Open – Men's doubles =

Men's doubles
- 2007 Pacific Life Open

Final
- Champion: (Czech Republic) Martin Damm (India) Leander Paes
- Runner-up: (Israel) Jonathan Erlich (Israel) Andy Ram
- Score: 6–4, 6–4

Events
Singles	men	women
Doubles	men	women
← 2006 ·	Pacific Life Open	· 2008 →

Mark Knowles and Daniel Nestor were the defending champions, but lost in the first round to Lukáš Dlouhý and David Škoch.

Martin Damm and Leander Paes won in the final 6–4, 6–4 against Jonathan Erlich and Andy Ram.

== Seeds ==
1. (Sweden) Jonas Björkman / (Belarus) Max Mirnyi (semifinals)
2. (United States) Bob Bryan / (United States) Mike Bryan (first round)
3. (The Bahamas) Mark Knowles / (Canada) Daniel Nestor (first round)
4. (Australia) Paul Hanley / (Zimbabwe) Kevin Ullyett (quarterfinals)
5. (Czech Republic) Martin Damm / (India) Leander Paes (champions)
6. (Israel) Jonathan Erlich / (Israel) Andy Ram (finals)
7. (Austria) Julian Knowle / (Austria) Jürgen Melzer (semifinals)
8. (Sweden) Simon Aspelin / (Germany) Michael Kohlmann (first round)

== Draw ==
=== Key ===
- Q = Qualifier
- WC = Wild card
- LL = Lucky loser
- Alt = Alternate
- SE = Special exempt
- PR = Protected ranking
- ITF = ITF entry
- JE = Junior exempt
- w/o = Walkover
- r = Retired
- d = Defaulted
- SR = Special ranking

=== Finals ===
Semifinals
1	(Sweden) Jonas Björkman (Belarus) Max Mirnyi	2	7^{7}	[10]
5	(Czech Republic) Martin Damm (India) Leander Paes	6	6^{5}	[12]
7	(Austria) Julian Knowle (Austria) Jürgen Melzer	2	5
6	(Israel) Jonathan Erlich (Israel) Andy Ram	6	7

Final
5	(Czech Republic) Martin Damm (India) Leander Paes	6	6
6	(Israel) Jonathan Erlich (Israel) Andy Ram	4	4

=== Section 1 ===
First round
1	(Sweden) J Björkman (Belarus) M Mirnyi	7	4	[10]
(Czech Republic) L Friedl (Czech Republic) P Pála	5	6	[4]
(South Africa) J Coetzee (Slovakia) D Hrbatý	6	1	[8]
(Romania) A Pavel (Germany) A Waske	4	6	[10]
(Argentina) JI Chela (Argentina) S Prieto	0	6	[7]
(United Kingdom) T Henman (United Kingdom) A Murray	6	3	[10]
A	(South Africa) C Haggard (Netherlands) R Wassen	2	6	[10]
8	(Sweden) S Aspelin (Germany) M Kohlmann	6	3	[7]
4	(Australia) P Hanley (Zimbabwe) K Ullyett	w/o
(Argentina) A Calleri (Chile) F González
(Spain) D Ferrer (Spain) T Robredo	4	6^{2}
(Switzerland) Y Allegro (Switzerland) R Federer	6	7^{7}
(Argentina) G Cañas (Argentina) D Nalbandian	3	4
(Poland) M Fyrstenberg (Poland) M Matkowski	6	6
(Belgium) O Rochus (United States) J Thomas	3	2
5	(Czech Republic) M Damm (India) L Paes	6	6

Second round
1	(Sweden) J Björkman (Belarus) M Mirnyi	4	6	[10]
(Romania) A Pavel (Germany) A Waske	6	4	[6]
(United Kingdom) T Henman (United Kingdom) A Murray	6	6
A	(South Africa) C Haggard (Netherlands) R Wassen	3	0
4	(Australia) P Hanley (Zimbabwe) K Ullyett	3	6	[13]
(Switzerland) Y Allegro (Switzerland) R Federer	6	2	[11]
(Poland) M Fyrstenberg (Poland) M Matkowski	3	5
5	(Czech Republic) M Damm (India) L Paes	6	7

Quarterfinals
1	(Sweden) J Björkman (Belarus) M Mirnyi	6	6
(United Kingdom) T Henman (United Kingdom) A Murray	3	4
4	(Australia) P Hanley (Zimbabwe) K Ullyett	3	6^{4}
5	(Czech Republic) M Damm (India) L Paes	6	7^{7}

Semifinals
1	(Sweden) J Björkman (Belarus) M Mirnyi	2	7^{7}	[10]
5	(Czech Republic) M Damm (India) L Paes	6	6^{5}	[12]

=== Section 2 ===
First round
7	(Austria) J Knowle (Austria) J Melzer	4	7^{7}	[10]
(Australia) A Fisher (United States) T Phillips	6	6^{5}	[8]
WC	(United States) E Butorac (United Kingdom) J Murray	7^{7}	7
WC	(Spain) F López (Spain) R Nadal	6^{6}	5
(India) M Bhupathi (Czech Republic) R Štěpánek	4	3
(France) J Benneteau (France) R Gasquet	6	6
(Czech Republic) L Dlouhý (Czech Republic) D Škoch	7^{7}	0	[10]
3	(The Bahamas) M Knowles (Canada) D Nestor	6^{4}	6	[8]
6	(Israel) J Erlich (Israel) A Ram	6^{5}	7	[10]
(Serbia) N Djokovic (Sweden) R Söderling	7^{7}	5	[7]
(Spain) N Almagro (Spain) F Verdasco	w/o
(Czech Republic) T Berdych (Croatia) I Ljubičić
(France) A Clément (France) M Llodra	5	7^{7}	[10]
(Czech Republic) F Čermák (Czech Republic) J Levinský	7	6^{2}	[3]
(Sweden) R Lindstedt (Finland) J Nieminen	6	6
2	(United States) B Bryan (United States) M Bryan	4	4

Second round
7	(Austria) J Knowle (Austria) J Melzer	6	5	[10]
WC	(United States) E Butorac (United Kingdom) J Murray	2	7	[5]
(France) J Benneteau (France) R Gasquet	6	7^{7}
(Czech Republic) L Dlouhý (Czech Republic) D Škoch	2	6^{5}
6	(Israel) J Erlich (Israel) A Ram	6	6
(Spain) N Almagro (Spain) F Verdasco	4	2
(France) A Clément (France) M Llodra	4	2
(Sweden) R Lindstedt (Finland) J Nieminen	6	6

Quarterfinals
7	(Austria) J Knowle (Austria) J Melzer	3	7^{7}	[11]
(France) J Benneteau (France) R Gasquet	6	6^{5}	[9]
6	(Israel) J Erlich (Israel) A Ram	7^{7}	6
(Sweden) R Lindstedt (Finland) J Nieminen	6^{5}	4

Semifinals
7	(Austria) J Knowle (Austria) J Melzer	2	5
6	(Israel) J Erlich (Israel) A Ram	6	7
