= 2007 BNP Paribas Masters =

- Date: 27 October – 4 November
- Edition: 35th
- Category: Masters Series
- Draw: 48S / 24D
- Prize money: $2,200,000
- Surface: Hard / indoor
- Location: Paris, France
- Venue: Palais omnisports de Paris-Bercy

Champions

Singles
- (Argentina) David Nalbandian

Doubles
- (United States) Bob Bryan / (United States) Mike Bryan
- Paris Masters

The 2007 Paris Masters (also known as the BNP Paribas Masters for sponsorship reasons) was a men's tennis tournament played on indoor hard courts. It was the 35th edition of the Paris Masters, and was part of the ATP Masters Series of the 2007 ATP Tour. It took place at the Palais omnisports de Paris-Bercy in Paris, France, from 27 October to 4 November 2007.

The singles draw featured World No. 1, Australian Open, Wimbledon and US Open champion, and Madrid Masters finalist Roger Federer, ATP No. 2 and French Open winner Rafael Nadal, and US Open runner-up and Vienna titlist Novak Djokovic. Other top seeds were US Open semifinalist, Moscow winner, and defending champion Nikolay Davydenko, US Open semifinalist and Tokyo titlist David Ferrer, James Blake, Fernando González and Tommy Robredo.

== Notable stories ==
=== Nalbandian's achievements ===
David Nalbandian won his second career Masters Series tournament, two weeks after his victory in Madrid, defeating again ATP No. 1 Roger Federer and No. 2 Rafael Nadal on his way to the title. Theories behind Nalbandian's resurgence abound, his new coach and diet, his overcoming of abdominal, back and leg injuries and of the death of a family member all being described as possibly being behind his upturn in fortune. Nalbandian became the first player to win the Madrid–Paris double since Marat Safin in 2004, the first player to defeat both Federer and Nadal twice each while they held the top two spots, and the first player to defeat both in a final.

== Finals ==
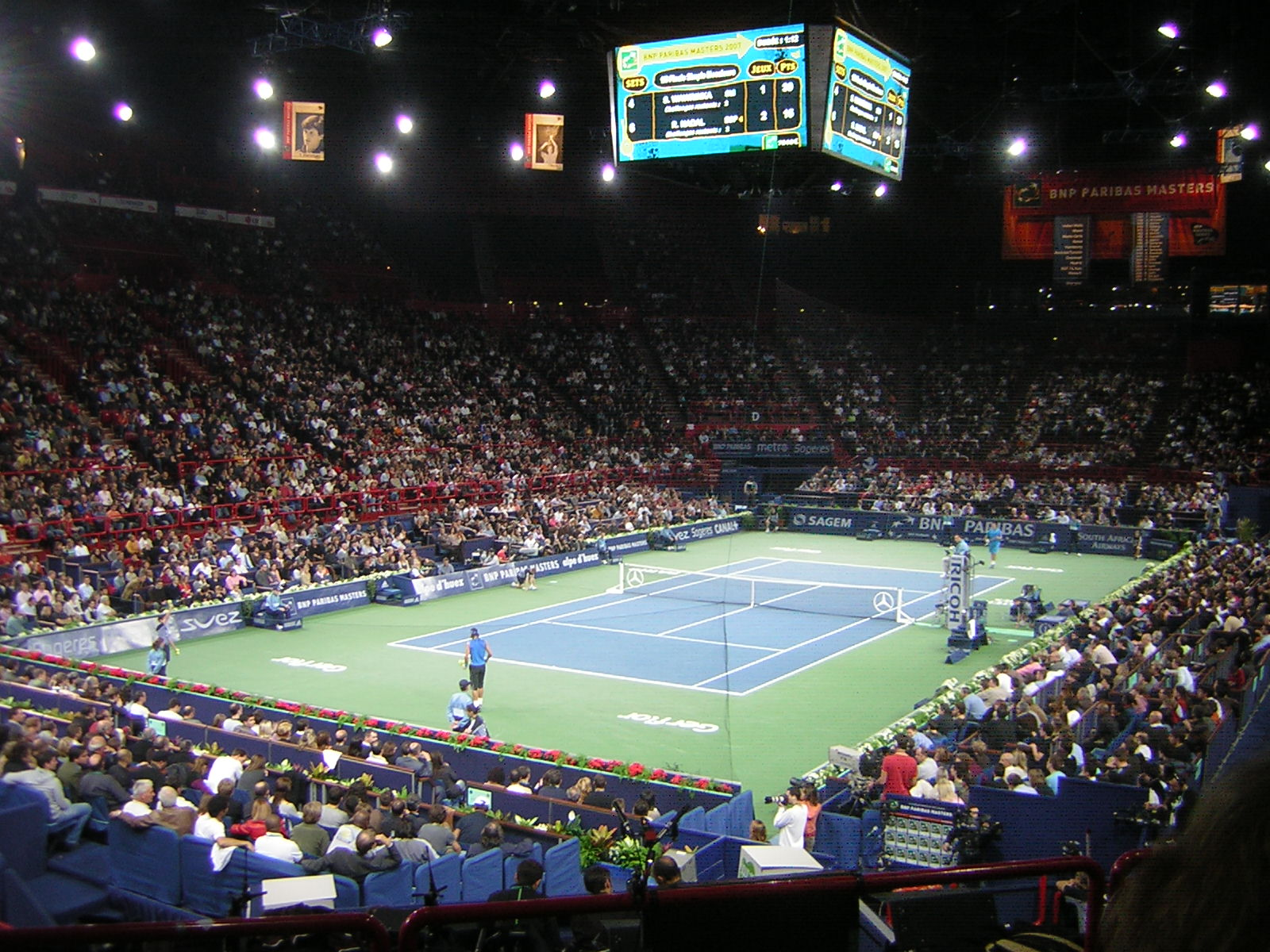
Nadal – Wawrinka 3rd round match

=== Singles ===
(Argentina) David Nalbandian defeated (Spain) Rafael Nadal 6–4, 6–0

- It was Nalbandian's 2nd title of the year, and his 7th overall. It was his 2nd Masters title of the year, and overall.

=== Doubles ===
(United States) Bob Bryan / (United States) Mike Bryan defeated (Canada) Daniel Nestor / (Serbia) Nenad Zimonjić 6–3, 7–6^{(7–4)}
