= 2007 Monte Carlo Masters =

- Date: 14–22 April
- Edition: 101st
- Category: Masters Series
- Draw: 56S / 24D
- Prize money: $2,200,000
- Surface: Clay / outdoor
- Location: Roquebrune-Cap-Martin, France
- Venue: Monte Carlo Country Club

Champions

Singles
- (Spain) Rafael Nadal

Doubles
- (United States) Bob Bryan / (United States) Mike Bryan
← 2006 ·	Monte Carlo Masters	· 2008 →

The 2007 Monte Carlo Masters was a men's tennis tournament played on outdoor clay courts. It was the 101st edition of the Monte Carlo Masters and was part of the ATP Masters Series of the 2007 ATP Tour. It took place at the Monte Carlo Country Club from 14 April through 22 April 2007.

== Review ==
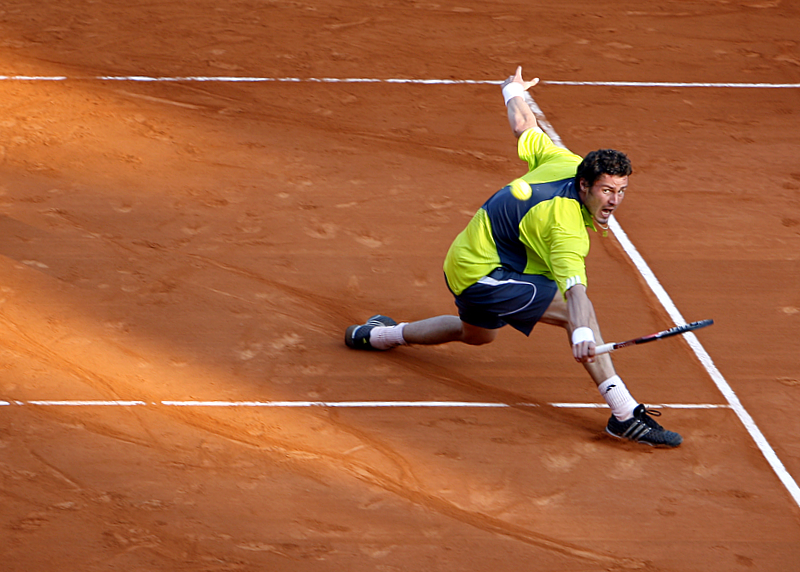
Marat Safin, who was knocked out in the second round.

Rafael Nadal won his third consecutive title and Monte Carlo in 2007. The Spaniard, second seed, defeated the current world number one, Roger Federer in one hour and thirty-six minutes 6–4, 6–4.

Before the tournament began, British number one Andy Murray pulled out due to back problems. During the first round matches, there were only a few shocks, with seeded players Jarkko Nieminen and Marcos Baghdatis failing to make it past there unseeded opponents. The second round the higher seeded players due to them all receiving a bye through the first round. Roger Federer defeated Italian Andreas Seppi, and Rafael Nadal beat Juan Ignacio Chela in straight sets. The highest seeded player not to make it into the third round was third seed Nikolay Davydenko. He was defeated by Swedish player Robin Söderling. Other casualties in the second round were Fernando González, Mikhail Youzhny and David Nalbandian.

In the third round, there were no shock results, with Rafael Nadal and Roger Federer both easing into the next round in straight sets. The quarter final draw was:

- [1] Roger Federer vs David Ferrer [12]
- [16] Juan Carlos Ferrero vs Richard Gasquet [11]
- [10] Tomáš Berdych vs Robin Söderling
- Philipp Kohlschreiber vs Rafael Nadal [2]

Rafael Nadal and Roger Federer both eased through into the semi-finals. However, both the other matches went to three sets. Juan Carlos Ferrero beat eleventh seed Richard Gasquet 5–7, 7–5, 6–2. Plus, Tomáš Berdych beat the unseeded Swedish player Robin Söderling 5–7, 6–3, 6–0.

In semi-finals, Federer and Nadal beat their opponents in straight sets to meet each other in the final. After over an hour and a half of tennis however, Rafael Nadal was victorious defeating the world number one in two sets, winning his third consecutive Monte Carlo Masters

The tournament, despite his loss in the final, represented an upturn in fortunes for Roger Federer. After winning the 2007 Australian Open and prestigious Dubai Tennis Championships, Federer suffered early losses in Indian Wells and Miami, tournaments he had won both in the previous two years.

== Finals ==
=== Singles ===
(Spain) Rafael Nadal defeated (Switzerland) Roger Federer, 6–4, 6–4

=== Doubles ===
(United States) Bob Bryan / (United States) Mike Bryan defeated (France) Julien Benneteau / (France) Richard Gasquet, 6–2, 6–1
