= 2007 Italian Open (tennis) =

- Date: 5–13 May (men); 13–20 May (women)
- Edition: 64th
- Surface: Clay / outdoor
- Location: Rome, Italy
- Venue: Foro Italico

Champions

Men's singles
- (Spain) Rafael Nadal

Women's singles
- (Serbia) Jelena Janković

Men's doubles
- (France) Fabrice Santoro / (Serbia) Nenad Zimonjić

Women's doubles
- (France) Nathalie Dechy / (Italy) Mara Santangelo
- Italian Open

The 2007 Italian Open (also known for 2007 Rome Masters and the sponsored name 2007 Internazionali BNL d'Italia) was the 2007 edition of the Italian Open tennis tournament. The men's tournament was part of the 2007 ATP Masters Series and was held from 5 May until 13 May 2007. The women's event was a 2007 WTA Tier I Series event and was held from 13 May until 20 May 2007.

Rafael Nadal was crowned champion for a record third consecutive year, and equalled Thomas Muster's overall record of three wins. Filippo Volandri, conqueror of Roger Federer, became the first Italian man to reach the semi-final stage since 1978, leaving Mara Santangelo as the only Italian among the winners for this year, triumphing in the women's doubles along with Nathalie Dechy of France.

Jelena Janković won her third title of the year after considering retirement during the previous year.

== Finals ==
=== Men's singles ===
(Spain) Rafael Nadal defeated (Chile) Fernando González 6–2, 6–2

=== Women's singles ===
(Serbia) Jelena Janković defeated (Russia) Svetlana Kuznetsova 7–5, 6–1

=== Men's doubles ===
(France) Fabrice Santoro / (Serbia) Nenad Zimonjić defeated (United States) Bob Bryan / (United States) Mike Bryan 6–4, 6–7 (4–7), [10–7]

=== Women's doubles ===
(France) Nathalie Dechy / (Italy) Mara Santangelo defeated (Italy) Tathiana Garbin / (Italy) Roberta Vinci 6–4, 6–1
