= 2007 Hamburg Masters =

- Date: 14–22 May
- Edition: 101st
- Category: ATP Masters Series
- Draw: 56S / 24D
- Prize money: $2,200,000
- Surface: Clay / outdoor
- Location: Hamburg, Germany
- Venue: Rothenbaum Tennis Center

Champions

Singles
- (Switzerland) Roger Federer

Doubles
- (United States) Bob Bryan / (United States) Mike Bryan
| ← 2006 · | Hamburg Masters | · 2008 → |

The 2007 Masters Series Hamburg presented by E.ON Hanse was the 101st edition of the Hamburg Masters tennis tournament. Roger Federer defeated Rafael Nadal in the singles final, ending Nadal's Open Era record 81-match winning streak on clay. Carlos Moyá reached his first Masters semifinal in three years, after languishing well outside the top-20 at the start of the year. Lleyton Hewitt was also a surprise semifinalist, pushing Nadal to three sets. It was Hewitt's first Masters semifinal since Indian Wells in 2005. Bob Bryan and Mike Bryan won the doubles title.

As the penultimate event before the 2007 French Open, it was believed after the event that Federer finally presented a significant threat to Nadal's reign as the King of Clay. Federer himself said that he had found the formula to beat Nadal on clay. However, Nadal was eventually able to retain his French Open crown, downing Federer in the final in four sets.

== Finals ==
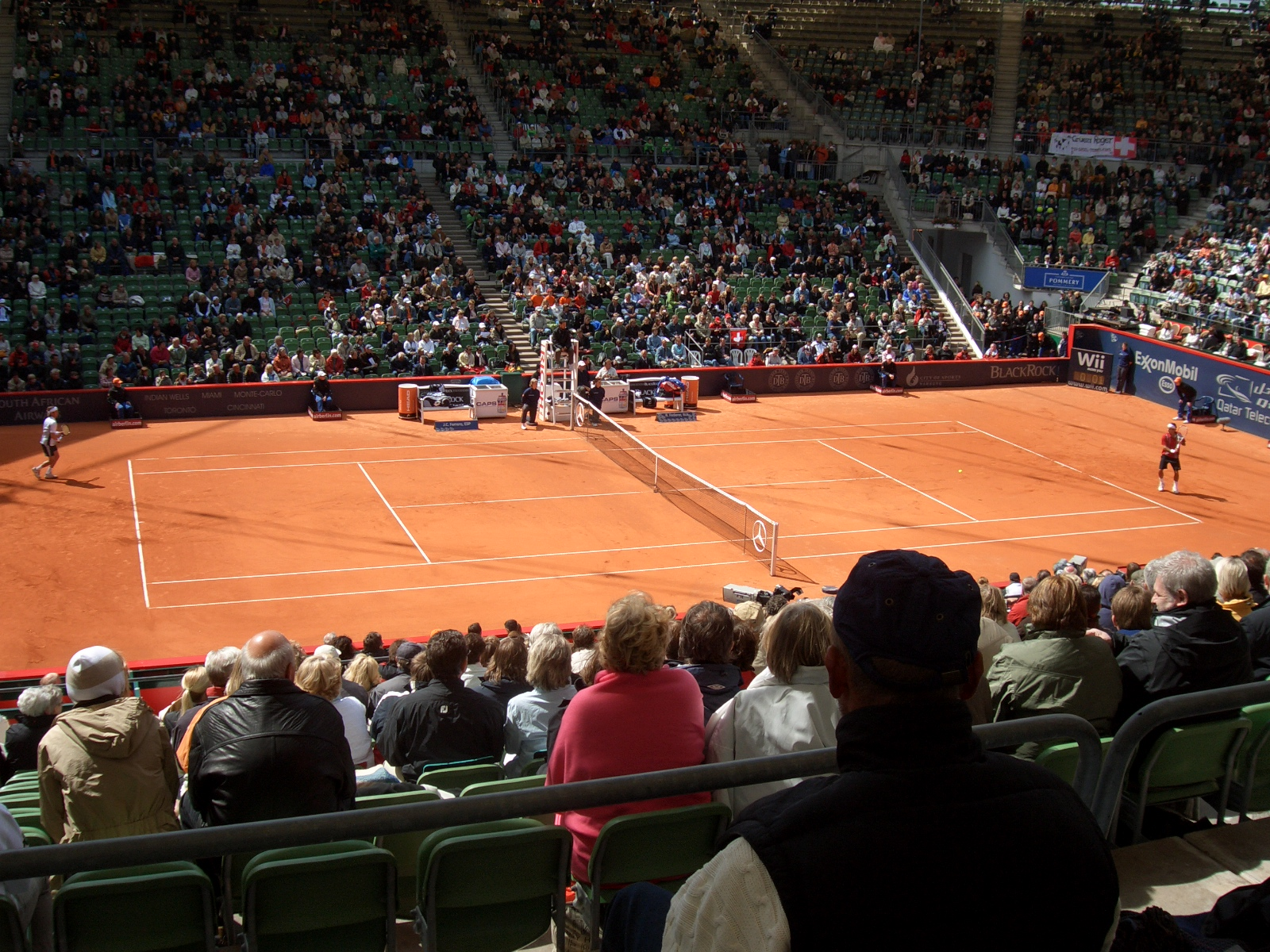
Juan Carlos Ferrero (l) against Roger Federer.

=== Singles ===
(Switzerland) Roger Federer defeated (Spain) Rafael Nadal 2–6, 6–2, 6–0

=== Doubles ===
(United States) Bob Bryan / (United States) Mike Bryan defeated (Australia) Paul Hanley / (Zimbabwe) Kevin Ullyett 6–3, 6–4
