= 2007 Mutua Madrileña Masters Madrid =

- Date: 15–21 October
- Edition: 6th
- Category: ATP Masters Series
- Draw: 48S / 24D
- Surface: Hard / indoor
- Location: Madrid, Spain
- Venue: Madrid Arena

Champions

Singles
- (Argentina) David Nalbandian

Doubles
- (United States) Bob Bryan / (United States) Mike Bryan
- Madrid Open

The 2007 Madrid Masters (also known as the Mutua Madrileña Masters Madrid for sponsorship reasons) was a tennis tournament played on indoor hard courts. It was the 6th edition of the Madrid Masters, and was part of the ATP Masters Series of the 2007 ATP Tour. It took place at the Madrid Arena in Madrid, Spain, from October 15 through October 21, 2007.

The announced field was led by world No. 1, Australian Open, Wimbledon and US Open winner and defending champion Roger Federer, ATP No. 2 and French Open winner Rafael Nadal, and US Open runner-up and Vienna titlist Novak Djokovic. Other top players were US Open semifinalist and Moscow winner Nikolay Davydenko, Australian Open runner up and Beijing titlist Fernando González, James Blake, David Ferrer and Tommy Robredo.

== Notable stories ==
=== Nalbandian's achievements ===
David Nalbandian, who prior to the tournament had not reached the semifinal stage of a tournament in the season, suddenly began playing superlative tennis, repeating Novak Djokovic's feat of the Canada Masters, of beating the world's top three players in three consecutive days, with Nalbandian doing it in order of 2 (Rafael Nadal), 3 (Novak Djokovic) and 1 (Roger Federer). The win also marked Nalbandian's first ever Masters Series title, though he had won the Tennis Masters Cup in 2005.

== Finals ==
=== Singles ===
(Argentina) David Nalbandian defeated (Switzerland) Roger Federer 1–6, 6–3, 6–3

- It was David Nalbandian's 1st title of the year, and his 6th overall. It was his 1st career Masters title.

=== Doubles ===
(United States) Bob Bryan / (United States) Mike Bryan defeated (Poland) Mariusz Fyrstenberg / (Poland) Marcin Matkowski 6–3, 7–6^{(7–4)}
