= 2007 Pacific Life Open =

- Date: March 5–18
- Edition: 34th
- Category: Masters Series (ATP); Tier I Series (WTA)
- Prize money: $3,035,000
- Surface: Hard / outdoor
- Location: Indian Wells, California, US
- Venue: Indian Wells Tennis Garden

Champions

Men's singles
- (Spain) Rafael Nadal

Women's singles
- (Slovakia) Daniela Hantuchová

Men's doubles
- (Czech Republic) Martin Damm / (India) Leander Paes

Women's doubles
- (United States) Lisa Raymond / (Australia) Samantha Stosur
← 2006 ·	Indian Wells Open	· 2008 →

The 2007 Indian Wells Open (also known as the Pacific Life Open for sponsorship reasons) was a tennis tournament played on Hard courts. It was the 34th edition of the Indian Wells Open and was part of the ATP Masters Series of the 2007 ATP Tour. Both the men's and the women's events took place at the Indian Wells Tennis Garden in Indian Wells, California, United States, from March 5 through March 18, 2007.

== Review ==
The tournament was the first Masters Series event on the 2007 ATP Tour, and saw Rafael Nadal win his first tournament of the year. Roger Federer lost unexpectedly in the second round to lucky loser Guillermo Cañas, who only returned to the circuit six months earlier after a ban for doping offences. Federer, on a 41-match unbeaten streak, was unable to break Guillermo Vilas' record of 46 straight victories. Novak Djokovic managed to make his first impression in a major tournament, reaching the final.

The women's side saw Daniela Hantuchová win the second tournament of her career, her first also coming at Indian Wells five years previously in 2002.

== Finals ==
=== Men's singles ===
(Spain) Rafael Nadal defeated (Serbia) Novak Djokovic 6–2, 7–5

- It was Nadal's 1st title of the year and his 18th overall. It was his 1st Masters title of the year and his 7th overall.

=== Women's singles ===
(Slovakia) Daniela Hantuchová defeated (Russia) Svetlana Kuznetsova 6–3, 6–4

- It was Hantuchová's 1st title of the year and her 2nd overall. It was her 1st Tier I title of the year and her 2nd overall. It was her second title at the event, also winning in 2002.

=== Men's doubles ===
(Czech Republic) Martin Damm / (India) Leander Paes defeated (Israel) Jonathan Erlich / (Israel) Andy Ram 6–4, 6–4

=== Women's doubles ===
(United States) Lisa Raymond / (Australia) Samantha Stosur defeated (Chinese Taipei) Chan Yung-jan / (Chinese Taipei) Chuang Chia-jung 6–3, 7–5
