= 2008 Hypo Group Tennis International =

- Date: 17–24 May
- Edition: 28th
- Category: International Series
- Draw: 32S / 16D
- Prize money: €349,000
- Surface: Clay / outdoor
- Location: Pörtschach am Wörthersee, Austria
- Venue: Werzer Arena

Champions

Singles
- (Russia) Nikolay Davydenko

Doubles
- (Brazil) Marcelo Melo / (Brazil) André Sá
- Hypo Group Tennis International

The 2008 Hypo Group Tennis International was a men's tennis tournament played on outdoor clay courts. It was the 28th edition of the Hypo Group Tennis International, and was part of the International Series of the 2008 ATP Tour. It took place at the Werzer Arena in Pörtschach am Wörthersee, Austria, from 17 May through 24 May 2008.

The field included ATP No. 4 and Miami Masters champion Nikolay Davydenko, defending champion and Valencia Open doubles titlist Juan Mónaco, and Zagreb runner-up Ivan Ljubičić. Also present in the draw were Indian Wells finalist Mardy Fish, Las Vegas winner Sam Querrey, Andreas Seppi, Mario Ančić and Robin Haase.

First-seeded Nikolay Davydenko won the singles title.

== Finals ==
=== Singles ===
(Russia) Nikolay Davydenko defeated (Argentina) Juan Mónaco 6–2, 2–6, 6–2

- It was Nikolay Davydenko's 2nd title of the year, and his 13th overall. It was his 3rd win at the event.

=== Doubles ===
(Brazil) Marcelo Melo / (Brazil) André Sá defeated (Austria) Julian Knowle / (Austria) Jürgen Melzer 7–5, 6–7^{(3–7)}, 13–11
