= 2008 Austrian Open (tennis) =

- Date: 14–20 July
- Edition: 38th
- Category: International Series Gold
- Draw: 32S / 16D
- Prize money: €550,000
- Surface: Clay / outdoor
- Location: Kitzbühel, Austria
- Venue: Kitzbühel Sportpark Tennis Stadium

Champions

Singles
- (Argentina) Juan Martín del Potro

Doubles
- (United States) James Cerretani / (Romania) Victor Hănescu
| ← 2007 · | Austrian Open | · 2009 → |

The 2008 Austrian Open was a men's tennis tournament played on outdoor clay courts. It was the 38th edition of the Austrian Open, and was part of the International Series Gold of the 2008 ATP Tour. It took place at the Kitzbühel Sportpark Tennis Stadium in Kitzbühel, Austria, from 14 July through 20 July 2008.

The singles field featured Bergamo Challenger winner and Hamburg Masters semifinalist Andreas Seppi, Houston and Munich doubles champion and Wimbledon semifinalist Rainer Schüttler, and Prostějov Challenger titlist and Stuttgart semifinalist Agustín Calleri. Other seeds were 2007 Kitzbühel singles runner-up and doubles champion Potito Starace, Stuttgart semifinalist Eduardo Schwank, Jürgen Melzer, Juan Martín del Potro and Olivier Rochus.

== Finals ==
=== Singles ===
(Argentina) Juan Martín del Potro defeated (Austria) Jürgen Melzer 6–2, 6–1

- It was Juan Martín del Potro's 2nd title of the year, and overall.

=== Doubles ===
(United States) James Cerretani / (Romania) Victor Hănescu defeated (Argentina) Lucas Arnold Ker / (Belgium) Olivier Rochus 6–3, 7–5
