= 2007 Hypo Group Tennis International =

- Date: 20–26 May
- Edition: 27th
- Category: International Series
- Draw: 32S / 16D
- Prize money: $416,000
- Surface: Clay / outdoor
- Location: Pörtschach am Wörthersee, Austria
- Venue: Werzer Arena

Champions

Singles
- (Argentina) Juan Mónaco

Doubles
- (Sweden) Simon Aspelin / (Austria) Julian Knowle
- Hypo Group Tennis International

The 2007 Hypo Group Tennis International was a men's tennis tournament that was part of the International Series of the 2007 ATP Tour. It was the 27th edition of the tournament and took place on outdoor clay courts at the Werzer Arena in Pörtschach am Wörthersee, Austria, from 20 May through 26 May 2007. The event was won by Juan Mónaco in men's singles and Simon Aspelin and Julian Knowle in men's doubles.

== Finals ==
=== Singles ===
(Argentina) Juan Mónaco defeated (France) Gaël Monfils, 7–6^{(7–3)}, 6–0

=== Doubles ===
(Sweden) Simon Aspelin / (Austria) Julian Knowle defeated (Czech Republic) Leoš Friedl / (Czech Republic) David Škoch, 7–6^{(8–6)}, 5–7, [10–5]
