= 2008 Austrian Open – Doubles =

Doubles
- 2008 Austrian Open

Final
- Champions: (United States) James Cerretani (Romania) Victor Hănescu
- Runners-up: (Argentina) Lucas Arnold Ker (Belgium) Olivier Rochus
- Score: 6–3, 7–5

Details
- Draw: 16
- Seeds: 4

Events
Singles	Doubles
- Austrian Open

Luis Horna and Potito Starace were the defending champions, but lost in the first round to James Cerretani and Victor Hănescu.

James Cerretani and Victor Hănescu won in the final 6–3, 7–5, against Lucas Arnold Ker and Olivier Rochus.

== Seeds ==
1. (Sweden) Simon Aspelin / (Austria) Julian Knowle (withdrew due to a leg injury for Knowle)
2. (Sweden) Robert Lindstedt / (Austria) Jürgen Melzer (semifinals)
3. (Germany) Christopher Kas / (Austria) Alexander Peya (first round)
4. (Peru) Luis Horna / (Italy) Potito Starace (first round)

== Draw ==
Key

- Q = Qualifier
- WC = Wild card
- LL = Lucky loser
- Alt = Alternate
- ITF = ITF entry
- PR = Protected ranking
- SR = Special ranking
- SE = Special exempt
- JE = Junior exempt
- JR = Junior Accelerator Programme entrant
- CO = College Accelerator Programme entrant
- NG = Next Gen Accelerator Program entrant
- w/o = Walkover
- r = Retired
- d = Defaulted

=== Draw ===
First round
ALT	(Germany) A Beck (Austria) M Fischer	4	2
(Austria) P Oswald (Switzerland) J-C Scherrer	6	6
(Colombia) S Giraldo (Argentina) L Mayer	2	3
WC	(Austria) D Köllerer (Germany) F Moser	6	6
4	(Peru) L Horna (Italy) P Starace	6^{6}	6	[8]
(United States) J Cerretani (Romania) V Hănescu	7	2	[10]
(Argentina) G Coria (Argentina) B Dabul	5	6	[12]
(Spain) R Ramírez Hidalgo (Argentina) S Roitman	7	3	[14]
(Argentina) L Arnold Ker (Belgium) O Rochus	6	6
(Czech Republic) T Cibulec (Czech Republic) I Minář	3	2
(Sweden) J Brunström (Netherlands Antilles) J-J Rojer	6	5	[10]
3	(Germany) C Kas (Austria) A Peya	4	7	[8]
(Argentina) M García (Brazil) B Soares	7	5	[6]
(United Kingdom) J Delgado (United Kingdom) J Murray	6^{7}	7	[10]
WC	(Austria) R Eitzinger (Austria) A Haider-Maurer	4	4
2	(Sweden) R Lindstedt (Austria) J Melzer	6	6

Quarterfinals
(Austria) P Oswald (Switzerland) J-C Scherrer	6^{2}	6^{7}
(Austria) D Köllerer (Germany) F Moser	7	7
(United States) J Cerretani (Romania) V Hănescu	6	6
(Spain) R Ramírez Hidalgo (Argentina) S Roitman	4	4
(Argentina) L Arnold Ker (Belgium) O Rochus	4	7	[10]
(Sweden) J Brunström (Netherlands Antilles) J-J Rojer	6	6^{6}	[8]
(United Kingdom) J Delgado (United Kingdom) J Murray	6^{4}	3
2	(Sweden) R Lindstedt (Austria) J Melzer	7	6

Semifinals
(Austria) D Köllerer (Germany) F Moser	3	3
(United States) J Cerretani (Romania) V Hănescu	6	6
(Argentina) L Arnold Ker (Belgium) O Rochus	6	7
2	(Sweden) R Lindstedt (Austria) J Melzer	1	5

Final
(United States) J Cerretani (Romania) V Hănescu	6	7
(Argentina) L Arnold Ker (Belgium) O Rochus	3	5
