= 2007 Austrian Open – Doubles =

Doubles
- 2007 Austrian Open

Final
- Champions: (Peru) Luis Horna (Italy) Potito Starace
- Runners-up: (Germany) Tomas Behrend (Germany) Christopher Kas
- Score: 7–6^{(7–4)}, 7–6^{(7–5)}

Details
- Draw: 16
- Seeds: 4

Events
Singles	Doubles
- Austrian Open

The 2007 Austrian Open was the thirty-sixth edition of the Austrian Open and it took place from July 23–30, 2007.

Philipp Kohlschreiber and Stefan Koubek were the defending champions, but none competed this year, as both players were focusing on the singles tournament.

Luis Horna and Potito Starace won the title by defeating Tomas Behrend and Christopher Kas 7–6^{(7–4)}, 7–6^{(7–5)} in the final.

== Seeds ==
1. (Sweden) Simon Aspelin / (Austria) Julian Knowle (semifinals)
2. (Czech Republic) Petr Pála / (Czech Republic) Pavel Vízner (quarterfinals)
3. (Czech Republic) František Čermák / (Czech Republic) Leoš Friedl (quarterfinals)
4. (Argentina) Martín García / (Argentina) Sebastián Prieto (quarterfinals)

== Draw ==
Key

- Q = Qualifier
- WC = Wild card
- LL = Lucky loser
- Alt = Alternate
- ITF = ITF entry
- PR = Protected ranking
- SR = Special ranking
- SE = Special exempt
- JE = Junior exempt
- JR = Junior Accelerator Programme entrant
- CO = College Accelerator Programme entrant
- NG = Next Gen Accelerator Program entrant
- w/o = Walkover
- r = Retired
- d = Defaulted

=== Draw ===
First round
1	(Sweden) S Aspelin (Austria) J Knowle	3	6	[10]
(Austria) O Marach (Austria) A Peya	6	3	[5]
(Argentina) A Calleri (Serbia) N Zimonjić	6	5	[11]
(Belarus) M Mirnyi (Spain) T Robredo	4	7	[9]
4	(Argentina) M García (Argentina) S Prieto	6	6
Alt	(United States) H Armando (Argentina) S Roitman	3	2
(Peru) L Horna (Italy) P Starace	6	6
WC	(Austria) D Köllerer (Austria) P Oswald	4	2
(Germany) T Behrend (Germany) C Kas	7^{7}	6
(Argentina) JI Chela (Chile) N Massú	6^{3}	3
(Czech Republic) T Cibulec (Czech Republic) C Suk	6^{3}	4
3	(Czech Republic) F Čermák (Czech Republic) L Friedl	7^{7}	6
(Spain) N Almagro (Spain) I Navarro Pastor	7^{7}	6
(Argentina) J Mónaco (Argentina) M Zabaleta	6^{5}	1
WC	(Austria) J Ager (France) J Eysseric	0	3
2	(Czech Republic) P Pála (Czech Republic) P Vízner	6	6

Quarterfinals
1	(Sweden) S Aspelin (Austria) J Knowle	6	6
(Argentina) A Calleri (Serbia) N Zimonjić	3	3
4	(Argentina) M García (Argentina) S Prieto	6	3	[9]
(Peru) L Horna (Italy) P Starace	3	6	[11]
(Germany) T Behrend (Germany) C Kas	6	6
3	(Czech Republic) F Čermák (Czech Republic) L Friedl	3	4
(Spain) N Almagro (Spain) I Navarro Pastor	6	6
2	(Czech Republic) P Pála (Czech Republic) P Vízner	4	4

Semifinals
1	(Sweden) S Aspelin (Austria) J Knowle	6^{3}	3
(Peru) L Horna (Italy) P Starace	7^{7}	6
(Germany) T Behrend (Germany) C Kas	6	6
(Spain) N Almagro (Spain) I Navarro Pastor	1	3

Final
(Peru) L Horna (Italy) P Starace	7^{7}	7^{7}
(Germany) T Behrend (Germany) C Kas	6^{4}	6^{5}
