= 2008 Austrian Open – Singles =

Singles
- 2008 Austrian Open

Final
- Champion: (Argentina) Juan Martín del Potro
- Runner-up: (Austria) Jürgen Melzer
- Score: 6–2, 6–1

Details
- Draw: 32 (4Q / 3WC)
- Seeds: 8

Events
Singles	Doubles
- Austrian Open

Juan Mónaco was the defending champion, but chose not to participate that year.

Seventh-seeded Juan Martín del Potro won in the final 6–2, 6–1, against Jürgen Melzer.

== Seeds ==
1. (Italy) Andreas Seppi (withdrew due to a leg injury)
2. (Germany) Rainer Schüttler (quarterfinals)
3. (Argentina) Agustín Calleri (first round)
4. (Italy) Potito Starace (semifinals)
5. (Argentina) Eduardo Schwank (quarterfinals)
6. (Austria) Jürgen Melzer (final)
7. (Argentina) Juan Martín del Potro (champion)
8. (Belgium) Olivier Rochus (first round)

== Draw ==
Key

- Q = Qualifier
- WC = Wild card
- LL = Lucky loser
- Alt = Alternate
- ITF = ITF entry
- PR = Protected ranking
- SR = Special ranking
- SE = Special exempt
- JE = Junior exempt
- JR = Junior Accelerator Programme entrant
- CO = College Accelerator Programme entrant
- NG = Next Gen Accelerator Program entrant
- w/o = Walkover
- r = Retired
- d = Defaulted

=== Finals ===
Semifinals
7	(Argentina) Juan Martín del Potro	6	7
(Romania) Victor Hănescu	3	6^{5}
4	(Italy) Potito Starace	4	7	3
6	(Austria) Jürgen Melzer	6	6^{6}	6

Final
7	(Argentina) Juan Martín del Potro	6	6
6	(Austria) Jürgen Melzer	2	1

=== Top half ===
First round
LL	(Germany) M Bachinger	3	3
(France) N Devilder	6	6
(Argentina) G Coria	7	0	r
WC	(Austria) A Peya	5	0
(Argentina) S Roitman	6	6
WC	(Austria) M Fischer	4	2
Q	(France) J Ouanna	3	3
7	(Argentina) JM del Potro	6	6
3	(Argentina) A Calleri	4	4
(Spain) G García López	6	6
(Spain) P Andújar	3	6	6^{2}
(Romania) V Hănescu	6	1	7
(Argentina) B Dabul	6	6
(Switzerland) S Bohli	1	1
(Czech Republic) I Minář	3	6	6
8	(Belgium) O Rochus	6	4	0

Second round
(France) N Devilder	6	6
WC	(Austria) A Peya	4	4
(Argentina) S Roitman	2	4
7	(Argentina) JM del Potro	6	6
(Spain) G García López	2	1
(Romania) V Hănescu	6	6
(Argentina) B Dabul	6	6
(Czech Republic) I Minář	4	3

Quarterfinals
(France) N Devilder	2	3
7	(Argentina) JM del Potro	6	6
(Romania) V Hănescu	6	6
(Argentina) B Dabul	3	4

Semifinals
7	(Argentina) JM del Potro	6	7
(Romania) V Hănescu	3	6^{5}

=== Bottom half ===
First round
5	(Argentina) E Schwank	6	6
(Germany) M Berrer	4	1
(France) É Prodon	3	4
Q	(Germany) D Brands	6	6
WC	(Austria) D Köllerer	7	7
Q	(Austria) P Oswald	6^{5}	6^{4}
Q	(Colombia) S Giraldo	1	2
4	(Italy) P Starace	6	6
6	(Austria) J Melzer	6	6
(Peru) L Horna	3	1
(Germany) D Gremelmayr	1	6^{3}
(Argentina) L Mayer	6	7
(Czech Republic) J Hernych	7	7
(Spain) R Ramírez Hidalgo	5	5
(Germany) A Beck	6	6^{5}	2
2	(Germany) R Schüttler	3	7	6

Second round
5	(Argentina) E Schwank	6	6
Q	(Germany) D Brands	1	4
WC	(Austria) D Köllerer	4	3
4	(Italy) P Starace	6	6
6	(Austria) J Melzer	6	6
(Argentina) L Mayer	4	2
(Czech Republic) J Hernych	6	4	5
2	(Germany) R Schüttler	2	6	7

Quarterfinals
5	(Argentina) E Schwank	1	2
4	(Italy) P Starace	6	6
6	(Austria) J Melzer	2	7	7
2	(Germany) R Schüttler	6	5	5

Semifinals
4	(Italy) P Starace	4	7	3
6	(Austria) J Melzer	6	6^{6}	6
