= 2007 Austrian Open – Singles =

Austrian Tennis Tournament

Singles
- 2007 Austrian Open

Final
- Champion: (Argentina) Juan Mónaco
- Runner-up: (Italy) Potito Starace
- Score: 5–7, 6–3, 6–4

Details
- Draw: 48
- Seeds: 16

Events
Singles	Doubles
- Austrian Open

The 2007 Austrian Open was the thirty-sixth edition of the Austrian Open and it took place from July 23–30, 2007. Fifth-seeded Juan Mónaco won the singles title, by defeating Potito Starace in the finals 5–7, 6–3, 6–4.

== Seeds ==
1. (Spain) Tommy Robredo (quarterfinals)
2. (Russia) Mikhail Youzhny (second round)
3. (Spain) Juan Carlos Ferrero (second round)
4. (Argentina) Juan Ignacio Chela (third round)
5. (Argentina) Juan Mónaco (champion)
6. (Argentina) Agustín Calleri (semifinals)
7. (Spain) Nicolás Almagro (third round)
8. (Germany) Florian Mayer (third round)
9. (Germany) Philipp Kohlschreiber (third round)
10. (Italy) Potito Starace (finalist)
11. (Spain) Fernando Verdasco (semifinals)
12. (Spain) Óscar Hernández (second round)
13. (Chile) Nicolás Massú (second round)
14. (Russia) Igor Andreev (third round)
15. (Ecuador) Nicolás Lapentti (quarterfinals)
16. (Austria) Werner Eschauer (second round)

== Draw ==
=== Key ===
- WC - Wildcard
- Q - Qualifier

=== Finals ===
Quarterfinals
1	(Spain) Tommy Robredo	2	6	2
5	(Argentina) Juan Mónaco	6	2	6
(Argentina) Sergio Roitman	6^{6}	6	3
11	(Spain) Fernando Verdasco	7	3	6
10	(Italy) Potito Starace	1	7	7
(Italy) Andreas Seppi	6	5	6^{7}
6	(Argentina) Agustín Calleri	7	6
15	(Ecuador) Nicolás Lapentti	6^{5}	1

Semifinals
5	(Argentina) Juan Mónaco	7	7
11	(Spain) Fernando Verdasco	5	5
10	(Italy) Potito Starace	6	7
6	(Argentina) Agustín Calleri	4	5

Finals
5	(Argentina) Juan Mónaco	5	6	6
10	(Italy) Potito Starace	7	3	4

=== Earlier rounds ===
==== Section 1 ====
First round
(Australia) P Luczak	3	4
(Argentina) JP Guzmán	6	6
(France) O Patience	6	6
(Czech Republic) J Hájek	3	2
Q	(United States) H Armando	0	3
(Chile) P Capdeville	6	6
(Italy) F Luzzi	6^{5}	2
(Argentina) M Zabaleta	7	6

Second round
1	(Spain) T Robredo	6	6
(Argentina) JP Guzmán	1	4
(France) O Patience	6^{5}	2
14	(Russia) I Andreev	7	6
9	(Germany) P Kohlschreiber	6	6
(Chile) P Capdeville	4	1
(Argentina) M Zabaleta	1	6	3
5	(Argentina) J Mónaco	6	2	6

Third round
1	(Spain) T Robredo	4	6	7
14	(Russia) I Andreev	6	1	6^{5}
9	(Germany) P Kohlschreiber	3	3
5	(Argentina) J Mónaco	6	6

Quarterfinals
1	(Spain) T Robredo	2	6	2
5	(Argentina) J Mónaco	6	2	6

==== Section 2 ====
First round
(Austria) S Koubek	4	0
WC	(Austria) D Köllerer	6	6
(Spain) G García López	6	1	1
(Argentina) S Roitman	2	6	6
Q	(France) J Chardy	5	3
(Peru) L Horna	7	6
(Greece) K Economidis	4	2
(Spain) I Navarro	6	6

Second round
4	(Argentina) JI Chela	3	6	6
WC	(Austria) D Köllerer	6	3	2
(Argentina) S Roitman	7	6
13	(Chile) N Massú	5	2
11	(Spain) F Verdasco	6	6
(Peru) L Horna	1	4
(Spain) I Navarro	5	3
7	(Spain) N Almagro	7	6

Third round
4	(Argentina) JI Chela	7	3	4
(Argentina) S Roitman	5	6	6
11	(Spain) F Verdasco	6	7
7	(Spain) N Almagro	2	6^{6}

Quarterfinals
(Argentina) S Roitman	6^{6}	6	3
11	(Spain) F Verdasco	7	3	6

==== Section 3 ====
First round
WC	(France) J Eysseric	2	3
(Argentina) M Vassallo Argüello	6	6
Q	(Belgium) C Rochus	7	7
(Australia) C Guccione	6^{6}	6^{10}
(Argentina) JP Brzezicki	4	3
Q	(Italy) F Fognini	6	6
(Italy) A Seppi	5	6	7
(Spain) F López	7	0	6^{3}

Second round
8	(Germany) F Mayer	6	6
(Argentina) M Vassallo Argüello	1	3
Q	(Belgium) C Rochus	2	2
10	(Italy) P Starace	6	6
16	(Austria) W Eschauer	6	4	5
Q	(Italy) F Fognini	4	6	7
(Italy) A Seppi	7	4	6
3	(Spain) JC Ferrero	6^{3}	6	2

Third round
8	(Germany) F Mayer	6	6^{0}	2
10	(Italy) P Starace	4	7	6
Q	(Italy) F Fognini	6^{3}	5
(Italy) A Seppi	7	7

Quarterfinals
10	(Italy) P Starace	1	7	7
(Italy) A Seppi	6	5	6^{7}

==== Section 4 ====
First round
Q	(Austria) R Eitzinger	6	3	7
(Belarus) M Mirnyi	4	6	6^{3}
WC	(Austria) M Fischer	7	4	2
(Argentina) D Hartfield	5	6	6
(Latvia) E Gulbis	7	3	4
Q	(France) L Recouderc	5	6	6
WC	(Austria) O Marach	3	6^{5}
(Austria) A Peya	6	7

Second round
6	(Argentina) A Calleri	6	7
Q	(Austria) R Eitzinger	3	6^{4}
(Argentina) D Hartfield	5	6	6
12	(Spain) Ó Hernández	7	0	3
15	(Ecuador) N Lapentti	7	6
Q	(France) L Recouderc	6^{5}	2
(Austria) A Peya	7	6
2	(Russia) M Youzhny	5	0

Third round
6	(Argentina) A Calleri	7	6
(Argentina) D Hartfield	5	2
15	(Ecuador) N Lapentti	6	6
(Austria) A Peya	4	4

Quarterfinals
6	(Argentina) A Calleri	7	6
15	(Ecuador) N Lapentti	6^{5}	1
