= 2007 Hypo Group Tennis International – Doubles =

Doubles
- 2007 Hypo Group Tennis International

Final
- Champions: (Sweden) Simon Aspelin (Austria) Julian Knowle
- Runners-up: (Czech Republic) Leoš Friedl (Czech Republic) David Škoch
- Score: 7–6^{(8–6)}, 5–7, [10–5]

Events
Singles	Doubles
← 2006 ·	Hypo Group Tennis International	· 2008 →

Paul Hanley and Jim Thomas were the defending champions, but Hanley did not participate this year. Thomas partnered Yves Allegro, losing in the quarterfinals.

Simon Aspelin and Julian Knowle won the title, defeating Leoš Friedl and David Škoch 7–6^{(8–6)}, 5–7, [10–5] in the final.

== Seeds ==
1. (Sweden) Simon Aspelin / (Austria) Julian Knowle (champions)
2. (Poland) Mariusz Fyrstenberg / (Poland) Marcin Matkowski (first round)
3. (Switzerland) Yves Allegro / (United States) Jim Thomas (quarterfinals)
4. (South Africa) Jeff Coetzee / (Netherlands) Rogier Wassen (first round)

== Draw ==
Key

- Q = Qualifier
- WC = Wild card
- LL = Lucky loser
- Alt = Alternate
- ITF = ITF entry
- PR = Protected ranking
- SR = Special ranking
- SE = Special exempt
- JE = Junior exempt
- JR = Junior Accelerator Programme entrant
- CO = College Accelerator Programme entrant
- NG = Next Gen Accelerator Program entrant
- w/o = Walkover
- r = Retired
- d = Defaulted

=== Draw ===
First round
1	(Sweden) S Aspelin (Austria) J Knowle	6	6
(Czech Republic) T Cibulec (Czech Republic) P Vízner	0	3
WC	(Austria) S Koubek (Austria) A Peya	7	6
(Slovakia) D Hrbatý (United States) M Russell	5	4
3	(Switzerland) Y Allegro (United States) J Thomas	6	6
(Australia) S Huss (United States) T Phillips	1	2
(Argentina) M García (Australia) J Kerr	6	6
PR	(United States) V Spadea (Netherlands) M Verkerk	1	1
(Czech Republic) L Friedl (Czech Republic) D Škoch	6	7^{7}
WC	(Belarus) M Mirnyi (Belarus) V Voltchkov	2	6^{4}
(United States) E Butorac (United Kingdom) J Murray	7^{10}	6^{5}	[10]
4	(South Africa) J Coetzee (Netherlands) R Wassen	6^{8}	7^{7}	[7]
(United States) A Delić (United States) A Roddick	6^{0}	7	[10]
(South Africa) C Haggard (South Korea) H-t Lee	7^{7}	5	[4]
(Czech Republic) F Čermák (Czech Republic) P Pála	6	6^{2}	[10]
2	(Poland) M Fyrstenberg (Poland) M Matkowski	3	7^{7}	[6]

Quarterfinals
1	(Sweden) S Aspelin (Austria) J Knowle	7^{7}	7
WC	(Austria) S Koubek (Austria) A Peya	6^{1}	5
3	(Switzerland) Y Allegro (United States) J Thomas	6^{5}	4
(Argentina) M García (Australia) J Kerr	7^{7}	6
(Czech Republic) L Friedl (Czech Republic) D Škoch	6	6
(United States) E Butorac (United Kingdom) J Murray	4	3
(United States) A Delić (United States) A Roddick	6	6
(Czech Republic) F Čermák (Czech Republic) P Pála	2	4

Semifinals
1	(Sweden) S Aspelin (Austria) J Knowle	6	3	[10]
(Argentina) M García (Australia) J Kerr	4	6	[6]
(Czech Republic) L Friedl (Czech Republic) D Škoch	w/o
(United States) A Delić (United States) A Roddick

Final
1	(Sweden) S Aspelin (Austria) J Knowle	7^{8}	5	[10]
(Czech Republic) L Friedl (Czech Republic) D Škoch	6^{6}	7	[5]
