= 2008 Hypo Group Tennis International – Doubles =

Doubles
- 2008 Hypo Group Tennis International

Final
- Champions: (Brazil) Marcelo Melo (Brazil) André Sá
- Runners-up: (Austria) Julian Knowle (Austria) Jürgen Melzer
- Score: 7–5, 6–7^{(3–7)}, [13–11]

Events
Singles	Doubles
← 2007 ·	Hypo Group Tennis International

Simon Aspelin and Julian Knowle were the defending champions, but Aspelin chose not to participate, and only Knowle competed that year.
Knowle partnered with Jürgen Melzer, but Marcelo Melo and André Sá defeated them 7–5, 6–7^{(3–7)}, [13–11], in the final.

== Seeds ==
1. (Brazil) Marcelo Melo / (Brazil) André Sá (champions)
2. (Austria) Julian Knowle / (Austria) Jürgen Melzer (final)
3. (United States) Scott Lipsky / (United States) David Martin (quarterfinals)
4. (Thailand) Sanchai Ratiwatana / (Thailand) Sonchat Ratiwatana (first round)

== Draw ==
=== Key ===
- Q = Qualifier
- WC = Wild card
- LL = Lucky loser
- Alt = Alternate
- SE = Special exempt
- PR = Protected ranking
- ITF = ITF entry
- JE = Junior exempt
- w/o = Walkover
- r = Retired
- d = Defaulted
- SR = Special ranking

=== Draw ===
First round
1	(Brazil) M Melo (Brazil) A Sá	6	3
WC	(Austria) R Eitzinger (Austria) A Sandbichler	1	1	r
(South Africa) C Haggard (Croatia) L Zovko	6	5	[10]
(Czech Republic) P Pála (Czech Republic) J Vaněk	2	7	[7]
3	(United States) S Lipsky (United States) D Martin	5	6	[10]
(United States) M Fish (United States) R Ginepri	7	3	[7]
(United States) J Isner (United States) S Querrey	2	2
WC	(Austria) P Oswald (Switzerland) J-C Scherrer	6	6
(United States) E Butorac (Australia) A Fisher	4	6	[7]
(Argentina) S Roitman (Israel) D Sela	6	1	[10]
(Netherlands) R Haase (Netherlands) R Wassen	6^{0}	6	[10]
4	(Thailand) S Ratiwatana (Thailand) S Ratiwatana	7	3	[5]
(Austria) O Marach (Slovakia) M Mertiňák	6	6
(United States) D Young (Germany) M Zverev	3	2
(United States) T Parrott (Slovakia) F Polášek	7	4	[8]
2	(Austria) J Knowle (Austria) J Melzer	6^{5}	6	[10]

Quarterfinals
1	(Brazil) M Melo (Brazil) A Sá	6	7
(South Africa) C Haggard (Croatia) L Zovko	1	6^{4}
3	(United States) S Lipsky (United States) D Martin	6^{3}	3
WC	(Austria) P Oswald (Switzerland) J-C Scherrer	7	6
(Argentina) S Roitman (Israel) D Sela	2	2
(Netherlands) R Haase (Netherlands) R Wassen	6	6
(Austria) O Marach (Slovakia) M Mertiňák	6	3	[8]
2	(Austria) J Knowle (Austria) J Melzer	3	6	[10]

Semifinals
1	(Brazil) M Melo (Brazil) A Sá	6	6^{18}	[10]
WC	(Austria) P Oswald (Switzerland) J-C Scherrer	3	7	[3]
(Netherlands) R Haase (Netherlands) R Wassen	4	6	[1]
2	(Austria) J Knowle (Austria) J Melzer	6	1	[10]

Final
1	(Brazil) M Melo (Brazil) A Sá	7	6^{3}	[13]
2	(Austria) J Knowle (Austria) J Melzer	5	7	[11]
