= 2008 Hypo Group Tennis International – Singles =

Singles
- 2008 Hypo Group Tennis International

Final
- Champion: (Russia) Nikolay Davydenko
- Runner-up: (Argentina) Juan Mónaco
- Score: 6–2, 2–6, 6–2

Details
- Draw: 32 (4Q / 3WC)
- Seeds: 8

Events
Singles	Doubles
← 2007 ·	Hypo Group Tennis International

Second-seeded Juan Mónaco was the defending champion, but first-seeded Nikolay Davydenko defeated him 6–2, 2–6, 6–2, in the final.

== Seeds ==
1. (Russia) Nikolay Davydenko (champion)
2. (Argentina) Juan Mónaco (final)
3. (Croatia) Ivan Ljubičić (semifinals)
4. (United States) Mardy Fish (first round)
5. (United States) Sam Querrey (second round)
6. (Italy) Andreas Seppi (quarterfinals)
7. (Croatia) Mario Ančić (first round)
8. (Netherlands) Robin Haase (second round)

== Draw ==
=== Key ===
- Q = Qualifier
- WC = Wild card
- LL = Lucky loser
- Alt = Alternate
- SE = Special exempt
- PR = Protected ranking
- ITF = ITF entry
- JE = Junior exempt
- w/o = Walkover
- r = Retired
- d = Defaulted
- SR = Special ranking

=== Finals ===
Semifinals
1	(Russia) Nikolay Davydenko	6	6
(Russia) Igor Kunitsyn	3	2
3	(Croatia) Ivan Ljubičić	4	7	6^{4}
2	(Argentina) Juan Mónaco	6	6^{4}	7

Final
1	(Russia) Nikolay Davydenko	6	2	6
2	(Argentina) Juan Mónaco	2	6	2

=== Top half ===
First round
1	(Russia) N Davydenko	6	6
WC	(Austria) R Eitzinger	1	1
Q	(Italy) S Vagnozzi	3	2
(United States) J Isner	6	6
(Germany) M Zverev	6^{2}	0
(Israel) D Sela	7	6
(Latvia) E Gulbis	6	4	3
6	(Italy) A Seppi	1	6	6
4	(United States) M Fish	1	1
(Russia) I Kunitsyn	6	6
(Russia) T Gabashvili	6	4	6^{3}
Q	(Slovenia) B Kavčič	4	6	7
(United States) D Young	5	2
(Austria) J Melzer	7	6
(Argentina) S Roitman	6^{7}	4
8	(Netherlands) R Haase	7	6

Second round
1	(Russia) N Davydenko	6	6^{3}	6
(United States) J Isner	2	7	3
(Israel) D Sela	5	1
6	(Italy) A Seppi	7	6
(Russia) I Kunitsyn	6	6
Q	(Slovenia) B Kavčič	1	4
(Austria) J Melzer	6	4	6
8	(Netherlands) R Haase	3	6	2

Quarterfinals
1	(Russia) N Davydenko	6	1	6
6	(Italy) A Seppi	3	6	3
(Russia) I Kunitsyn	6	3	6
(Austria) J Melzer	4	6	3

Semifinals
1	(Russia) N Davydenko	6	6
(Russia) I Kunitsyn	3	2

=== Bottom half ===
First round
5	(United States) S Querrey	3	6	6
WC	(Austria) O Marach	6	4	4
(Austria) W Eschauer	4	2
(Spain) D Gimeno Traver	6	6
(Spain) I Navarro	6	6
(United States) V Spadea	4	4
Q	(Czech Republic) J Hájek	6	0	3
3	(Croatia) I Ljubičić	4	6	6
7	(Croatia) M Ančić	6	3	6^{8}
(United States) R Ginepri	4	6	7
(Belgium) O Rochus	6	6
Q	(Poland) M Przysiężny	2	4
WC	(Netherlands) M Verkerk	5	6	2
(Czech Republic) J Vaněk	7	4	6
(Argentina) C Berlocq	1	r
2	(Argentina) J Mónaco	4

Second round
5	(United States) S Querrey	1	3
(Spain) D Gimeno Traver	6	6
(Spain) I Navarro	6^{3}	4
3	(Croatia) I Ljubičić	7	6
(United States) R Ginepri	4	6	6
(Belgium) O Rochus	6	2	3
(Czech Republic) J Vaněk	2	2
2	(Argentina) J Mónaco	6	6

Quarterfinals
(Spain) D Gimeno Traver	3	6	6^{6}
3	(Croatia) I Ljubičić	6	4	7
(United States) R Ginepri	5	6^{3}
2	(Argentina) J Mónaco	7	7

Semifinals
3	(Croatia) I Ljubičić	4	7	6^{4}
2	(Argentina) J Mónaco	6	6^{4}	7
