= 2007 Hypo Group Tennis International – Singles =

Singles
- 2007 Hypo Group Tennis International

Final
- Champion: (Argentina) Juan Mónaco
- Runner-up: (France) Gaël Monfils
- Score: 7–6^{(7–3)}, 6–0

Events
Singles	Doubles
← 2006 ·	Hypo Group Tennis International	· 2008 →

Juan Mónaco defeated Gaël Monfils 7–6^{(7–3)}, 6–0 to win the 2007 Hypo Group Tennis International singles event.

== Seeds ==
1. (Russia) Nikolay Davydenko (quarterfinals)
2. (United States) Andy Roddick (quarterfinals)
3. (Croatia) Ivan Ljubičić (second round)
4. (Australia) Lleyton Hewitt (semifinals)
5. (Slovakia) Dominik Hrbatý (first round)
6. (Austria) Jürgen Melzer (first round)
7. (South Korea) Lee Hyung-Taik (second round)
8. (Belarus) Max Mirnyi (first round)

== Draws ==
=== Key ===
- Q = Qualifier
- WC = Wild card
- LL = Lucky loser
- Alt = Alternate
- SE = Special exempt
- PR = Protected ranking
- ITF = ITF entry
- JE = Junior exempt
- w/o = Walkover
- r = Retired
- d = Defaulted
- SR = Special ranking

=== Finals ===
Semifinals				Finals
	(Argentina) Juan Mónaco	6	6
	(Peru) Luis Horna	4	4		(Argentina) Juan Mónaco	7	6
4	(Australia) Lleyton Hewitt	4	5	WC	(France) Gaël Monfils	6^{3}	0
WC	(France) Gaël Monfils	6	7

=== Top half ===
First round
1	(Russia) N Davydenko	6	6
(Spain) R Ramírez Hidalgo	3	0
(Ecuador) N Lapentti	6	7
(Netherlands) M Verkerk	4	6^{4}
(Argentina) M Vassallo Argüello	1	6^{4}
(United States) M Russell	6	7
(Argentina) J Mónaco	6	6
6	(Austria) J Melzer	3	1
3	(Croatia) I Ljubičić	7	7
(United States) A Delic	6^{7}	6^{8}
(Peru) L Horna	6	6
Q	(Ukraine) O Dolgopolov Jr.	3	0
(Italy) D Bracciali	0	4
(Spain) Montañés	6	6
Q	(France) M Montcourt	6	6
8	(Belarus) M Mirnyi	4	4

Second round
1	(Russia) N Davydenko	6	6
(Ecuador) N Lapentti	4	2
(United States) M Russell	3	1
(Argentina) J Mónaco	6	6
3	(Croatia) I Ljubičić	6^{5}	4
(Peru) L Horna	7	6
(Spain) Montañés	7	6
Q	(France) M Montcourt	6^{6}	1

Quarterfinals
1	(Russia) N Davydenko	2	7	4
(Argentina) J Mónaco	6	6^{5}	6
(Peru) L Horna	7	6^{2}	6
(Spain) Montañés	6^{4}	7	1

Semifinals
(Argentina) J Mónaco	6	6
(Peru) L Horna	4	4

=== Bottom half ===
First round
5	(Slovakia) D Hrbatý	1	5
(United States) V Spadea	6	7
(Argentina) D Hartfield	6	6
(Switzerland) S Wawrinka	2	4
Q	(Italy) P Starace	6	6
(Austria) S Koubek	4	4
(Argentina) S Roitman	2	2
4	(Australia) L Hewitt	6	6
7	(South Korea) L Hyung-Taik	6	6
(Thailand) D Udomchoke	3	0
WC	(France) G Monfils	6	7
(United States) S Querrey	4	5
(Denmark) K Pless	6	6
Q	(Argentina) C Berlocq	3	3
WC	(Austria) A Peya	4	5
2/WC	(United States) A Roddick	6	7

Second round
(United States) V Spadea	4	6^{5}
(Argentina) D Hartfield	6	7
Q	(Italy) P Starace	4	4
4	(Australia) L Hewitt	6	6
7	(South Korea) L Hyung-Taik	6^{5}	4
WC	(France) G Monfils	7	6
(Denmark) K Pless	4	3
2/WC	(United States) A Roddick	6	6

Quarterfinals
(Argentina) D Hartfield	2	2
4	(Australia) L Hewitt	6	6
WC	(France) G Monfils	7	6
2/WC	(United States) A Roddick	5	3

Semifinals
4	(Australia) L Hewitt	4	5
WC	(France) G Monfils	6	7
