= 2007 Austrian Open (tennis) =

- Date: 23–30 July
- Edition: 37th
- Category: International Series Gold
- Draw: 48S / 16D
- Prize money: $735,000
- Surface: Clay / Outdoor
- Location: Kitzbühel, Austria
- Venue: Kitzbühel Sportpark Tennis Stadium

Champions

Singles
- (Argentina) Juan Mónaco

Doubles
- (Peru) Luis Horna / (Italy) Potito Starace
- Austrian Open

The 2007 Austrian Open was a tennis tournament played on outdoor clay courts. It was the 37th edition of the Austrian Open, and was part of the International Series Gold of the 2007 ATP Tour. It took place at the Kitzbühel Sportpark Tennis Stadium in Kitzbühel, Austria, from 23 July through 30 July 2007.

Fifth-seeded Juan Mónaco won his third career title, all of which came in 2007.

== Finals ==
=== Singles ===
(Argentina) Juan Mónaco defeated (Italy) Potito Starace 5–7, 6–3, 6–4

=== Doubles ===
(Peru) Luis Horna / (Italy) Potito Starace defeated (Germany) Tomas Behrend / (Germany) Christopher Kas 7–6^{(7–4)}, 7–6^{(7–5)}
