= Werzer Arena =

Arena in Pörtschach am Wörthersee, Austria

Coordinates: 46.634395°N 14.140456°E

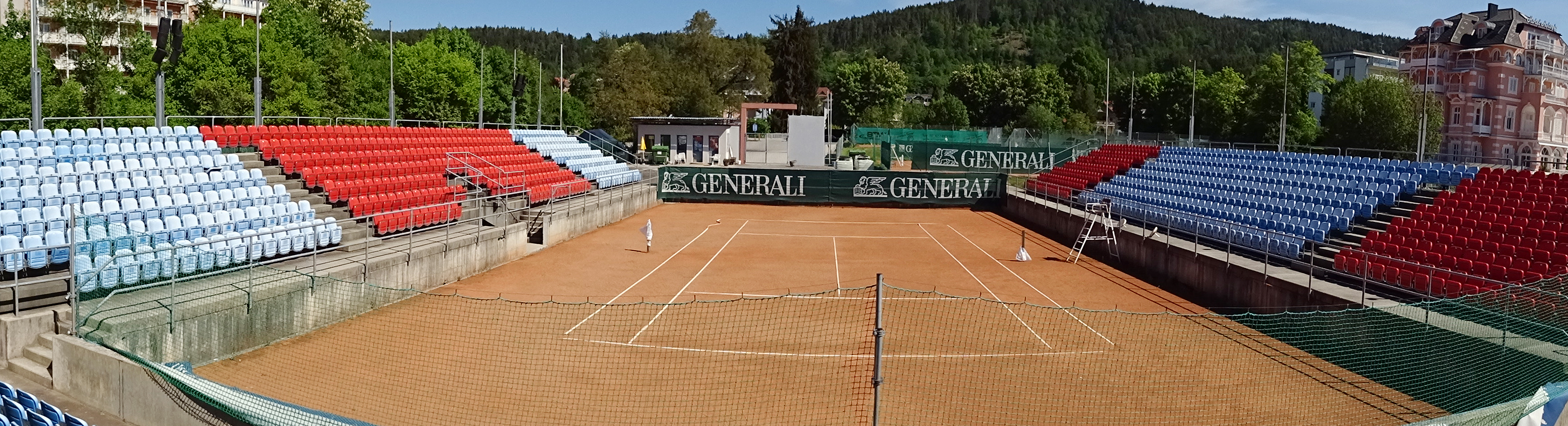
- Interactive map of Werzer Arena
- Location: Pörtschach am Wörthersee, Austria
- Capacity: 1,500
- Surface: Clay, Outdoors

Construction
- Groundbreaking: ?
- Opened: ?
- Cost: ?
- Architect: ?

The Werzer Arena is a tennis complex in Pörtschach am Wörthersee, Austria. It was the home of the annual Hypo Group Tennis International.

== See also ==
- List of tennis stadiums by capacity
