= Juan Monaco =

Argentine tennis player (born 1984)

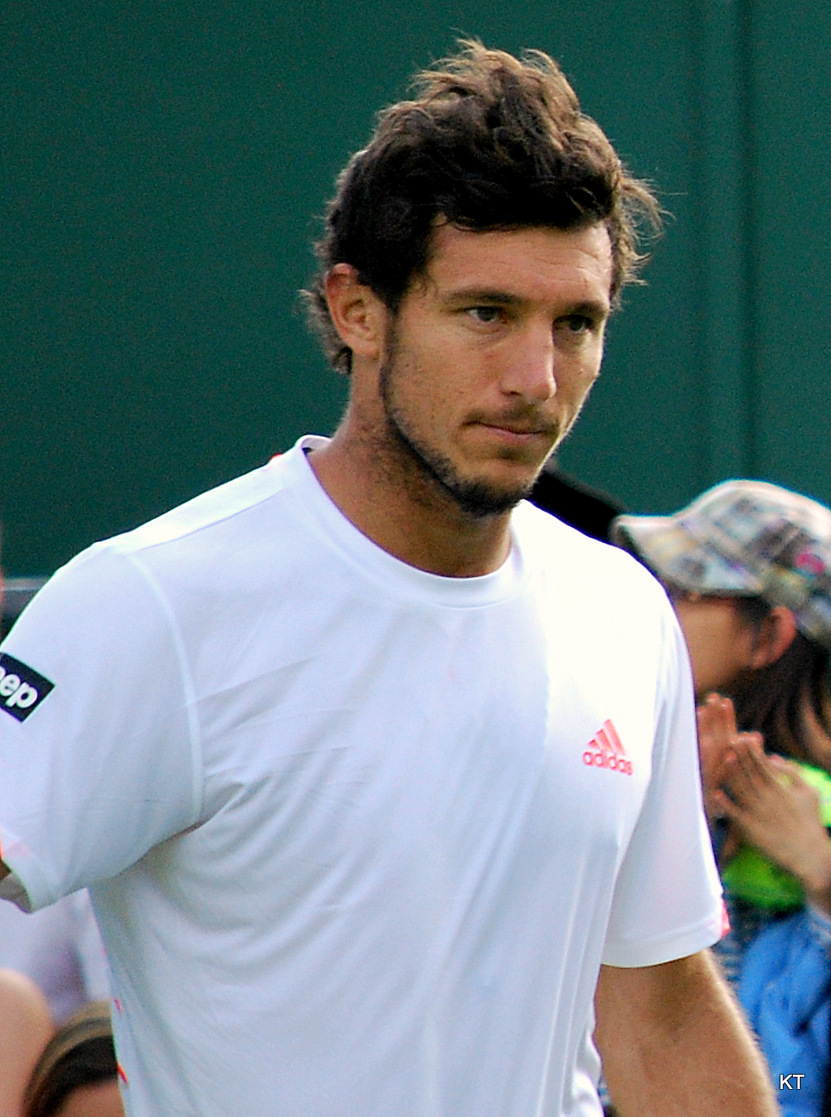
- Monaco at Wimbledon in 2012
- Full name: Juan Monaco
- Country (sports): Argentina
- Residence: Buenos Aires, Argentina
- Born: 29 March 1984 (age 42) Tandil, Argentina
- Height: 1.85 m (6 ft 1 in)
- Turned pro: 2002
- Retired: 15 May 2017
- Plays: Right-handed (two-handed backhand)
- Prize money: $8,084,437

Singles
- Career record: 342–271
- Career titles: 9
- Highest ranking: No. 10 (23 July 2012)

Grand Slam singles results
- Australian Open: 3R (2008, 2010)
- French Open: 4R (2007, 2012)
- Wimbledon: 3R (2012, 2013)
- US Open: 4R (2007, 2011)

Other tournaments
- Olympic Games: 2R (2012, 2016)

Doubles
- Career record: 84–121
- Career titles: 3
- Highest ranking: No. 41 (5 January 2009)

Grand Slam doubles results
- Australian Open: 3R (2009)
- French Open: QF (2014)
- Wimbledon: 1R (2005, 2009)
- US Open: SF (2008)

Team competitions
- Davis Cup: W (2016)
- Last updated on: 1 August 2017.

Juan Monaco (Spanish pronunciation: [ˈxwam ˈmonako]; (Note: In isolation, Juan is pronounced [ˈxwan].) born 29 March 1984), nicknamed "Pico", is an Argentine former professional tennis player. He won nine singles titles, reached the semifinals of the 2010 Shanghai Masters and the 2012 Miami Masters, and achieved a career-high singles ranking of world no. 10 in July 2012. He announced his retirement from professional tennis on 15 May 2017.

== Life and career ==
Monaco was born in Tandil, Buenos Aires Province, to Héctor, a businessman, and Cristina, an architect. He has two siblings. He enjoys spending time at home in Tandil with family and friends. His favourite sports to follow are football and basketball. His favourite teams are Estudiantes de La Plata and the San Antonio Spurs. His favourite surface is clay. He counts Andre Agassi and his countryman Mariano Zabaleta among his heroes. He also enjoys going to the cinema. His favourite films are Gladiator and 300. He is also a fan of The Lord of the Rings.

Monaco started playing tennis at the age of six. He was mentored by Luis Lobo of Argentina. Since the latter part of the 2010 season, Monaco has been coached by Mariano Zabaleta. He added Gastón Etlis to his coaching team in February 2011.

== Career ==
=== 2002–2003 ===
In 2002, Monaco made his pro circuit debut. On 12 February, he won his first tournament in Jamaica F20, Montego Bay by defeating Francisco Rodríguez of Paraguay. He ended the year ranked no. 470 in singles.

In 2003, Monaco reached six finals, finishing as runner-up in two events in Jamaica F3, Montego Bay, losing to American Wayne Odesnik, and in Argentina F6, Buenos Aires losing to compatriot Diego Moyano. He however won four, all on clay, of his six finals. He won in Jamaica F4, Montego Bay, in Bolivia F1, La Paz, in Argentina F1, Buenos Aires, and Uruguay F2, Uruguay defeating Dmitri Sitak of Russia, and his compatriots Matias O'Neille, Carlos Berlocq, and Ignacio González King respectively. He ended the year ranked at no. 324 in singles.

=== 2004–2006 ===
Monaco started 2004 by winning in São Paulo–1, Brazil defeating Adrián García of Chile. He also made his ATP Debut in his home of Buenos Aires, Argentina in the 2004 Argentina Open, where he reached the quarterfinals (l. Guillermo Coria). He followed this up with a third-round result in his first Master Series event in the 2004 NASDAQ-100 Open, losing to Paradorn Srichaphan. He made his Grand Slam debut in the 2004 French Open as a qualifier, losing in the second round to eventual finalist and compatriot Guillermo Coria. He also reached the quarterfinals of the 2004 Swedish Open, losing to Chilean Fernando González. He got his best result of the year reaching his first semifinal in 2004 Idea Prokom Open in Sopot (l. to José Acasuso) and 2004 Campionati Internazionali di Sicilia in Paloma (l. to Filippo Volandri). He also made his 2004 US Open debut, but lost to compatriot Gastón Gaudio in the first round. He ended the year in the top 100 for the first time, ranked at no. 73 in singles.

In 2005, Monaco made his 2005 Australian Open debut, losing in the first round to American Mardy Fish. He reached the second round of the 2005 Pacific Life Open and the quarterfinals in 2005 BMW Open, both times losing to compatriot David Nalbandian. He reached his first ATP finals in Casablanca at the 2005 Grand Prix Hassan II, but lost to compatriot Mariano Puerta. He reached the second round of 2005 Internazionali BNL d'Italia and the 2005 Hamburg Masters, losing to Guillermo Cañas and Jiří Novák, respectively. He lost in the first round of the 2005 French Open to Sébastien Grosjean. He made his Wimbledon debut, losing to Novak Djokovic. However, he got his first top-20 win, defeating Spaniard David Ferrer, but lost the next round to Tomáš Zíb in the 2005 Mercedes Cup Open. He reached the quarterfinals in the Vietnam Open, losing to Radek Štěpánek. He ended the year 12 places lower than the previous year, at no. 85.

In 2006, Monaco recorded three first-round exits in the first two months in Buenos Aires, Santiago, Chile, and Adelaide and second-round exits at the Australian Open and the 2006 Medibank International. However, he rebounded by reaching the semifinals in the Brasil Open, losing to Nicolás Massú of Chile. Following the semifinal appearance, he lost four straight matches in Acapulco, the 2006 NASDAQ-100 Open, the 2006 U.S. Men's Clay Court Championships, and Morocco. He also lost in the first round of the 2006 Internazionali BNL d'Italia, losing to veteran French player Fabrice Santoro, and lost in the second round of the 2006 Hamburg Masters to Robin Söderling.

Following these losses, Monaco achieved great results in the next four weeks, reaching the quarterfinals in Poertschach (l. to Luis Horna), the third round of Roland Garros (l. to Ivan Ljubičić), and the semifinals of the 2006 Mercedes Cup (l. to José Acasuso). Following this semifinal appearance, he lost four matches in a row again a second-round loss in the Orange Warsaw Open (l. to Nikolay Davydenko) and a first-round loss at the US Open, BCR Open Romania, and the Kingfisher Airlines Tennis Open. He reached the third round of the AIG Japan Open Tennis Championships, losing to Jarkko Nieminen. He ended the year ranked number no. 69 in singles.

In doubles, he made two semifinal appearance in the 2007 Brasil Open partnering compatriot Agustín Calleri, and in the 2007 Mercedes Cup partnering José Acasuso.

=== 2007 ===
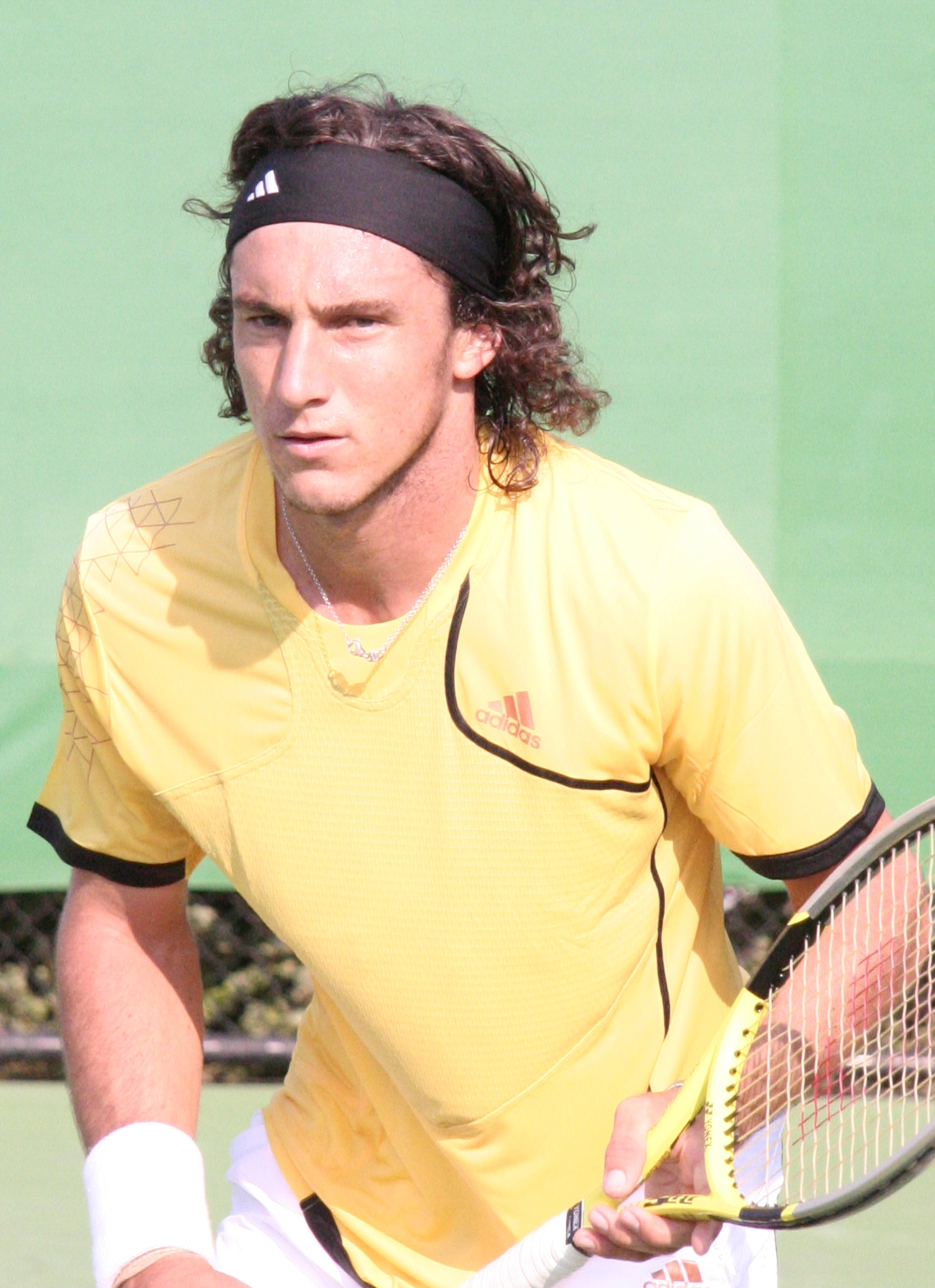
Juan Monaco at the 2007 Australian Open

2007 was Monaco's most successful year. Monaco started the year with a quarterfinal appearance at the 2007 Heineken Open, losing to compatriot Agustín Calleri. He also reached the quarterfinals of the 2007 Brasil Open losing to another compatriot Juan Ignacio Chela. Monaco entered his home tournament of 2007 Copa Telmex in Buenos Aires ranked at no. 66, and exited with his first ATP title dominating Alessio di Mauro in the final in straight sets.

However, he exited in the first round of his next three tournaments in the Acapulco, Indian Wells, and a Challenger event. He reached the second round of the 2007 Miami Masters, losing to David Ferrer. He also reached the quarterfinals of the 2007 U.S. Men's Clay Court Championships, losing to American James Blake and at the 2007 Estoril Open (l. to Paul-Henri Mathieu). He qualified for the Hamburg Masters, but lost to top seed and eventual champion Roger Federer in the second round in three tight sets. Following his good performance against Federer, he went on to compete in the 2007 Hypo Group Tennis International in Pörtschach and won the title against Gaël Monfils. In the 2007 Mercedes Cup in Stuttgart he lost to Rafael Nadal in straight sets in the quarterfinals.

He won his third title of the year in the 2007 Austrian Open in Kitzbühel after defeating the top seed Tommy Robredo in the quarterfinals and Potito Starace in the final. In the 2007 Cincinnati Masters, he defeated a player in the top 5 for the first time and the highest-ranked player he has defeated the world no. 2 at the time Rafael Nadal, when Nadal retired. Monaco lost to Sam Querrey in the third round. He also reached the quarterfinals of the 2007 Stockholm Open, where he lost to Tommy Haas, and the third round of the 2007 Madrid Masters, after avenging his lost against Tommy Haas in the second round.

In the Grand Slams, Monaco lost in the first round of the Australian Open and Wimbledon, losing to Nicolas Mahut and Kristof Vliegen, respectively. However, he reached the fourth round of the French Open and the US Open, losing to former French Open Champion Guillermo Cañas and Novak Djokovic. These results are the farthest he has gone at Grand Slams. He ended the year ranked no. 23, his highest year-end rank.

=== 2008 ===
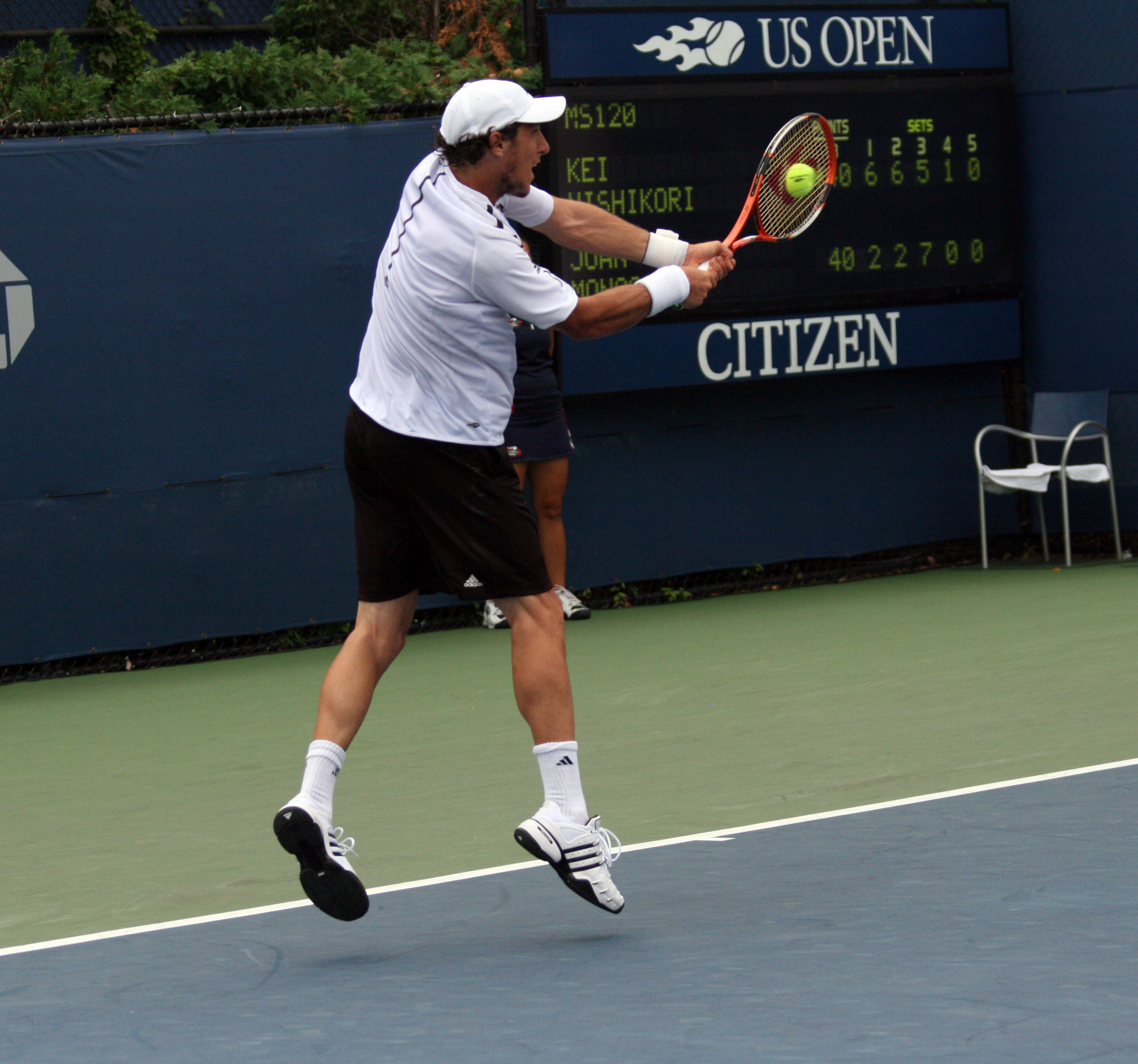
Juan Monaco in 2008 against Kei Nishikori in the US Open

In 2008, Monaco started the year with a semifinal appearance at the 2008 Heineken Open, losing to German Philipp Kohlschreiber. He also reached the third round of the 2008 Australian Open, the furthest he has reached so far, losing to Tomáš Berdych. In his first tournament after the Australian Open, he reached the final of the 2008 Movistar Open. He was scheduled to play Fernando González in the final, but Gonzalez was granted a walkover due to a left ankle injury sustained by Monaco during the doubles final. Despite this, his performance during the week elevated Monaco to a career-high ranking of world no. 14.

At the 2008 Copa Telmex as the defending champion, Monaco lost in the first round. Shortly afterwards, he lost in the second round of the 2008 Abierto Mexicano Telcel in Acapulco. He also reached the third round of both the 2008 Pacific Life Open in Indian Wells, losing to Guillermo Cañas, and the 2008 Sony Ericsson Open in Miami, losing to Mario Ančić. He represented Argentina in the Davis Cup quarterfinal clash against Sweden and won his only match against Thomas Johansson.

He reached the quarterfinals in Valencia and the second round of the 2008 Monte Carlo Masters and 2008 Rome Masters losing to Nicolás Almagro and Igor Andreev, respectively. He also reached the third round of the 2008 Hamburg Masters, losing to Andreas Seppi and the final, of 2008 Hypo Group Tennis International losing to top seed Nikolay Davydenko. He reached the semifinals of the 2008 Orange Warsaw Open, losing to Tommy Robredo. At the Beijing Olympics, Monaco lost to Marin Čilić in three tight sets 4–6, 7–6^{(7–5)}, 3–6, followed by successive defeats at the 2008 Pilot Pen Tennis and the 2008 US Open. He fell in the first round of the 2008 Mutua Madrileña Masters Madrid, losing to Radek Štěpánek, and the 2008 Grand Prix de Tennis de Lyon to Gilles Simon. He reached the second round of both the 2008 Stockholm Open and the 2008 BNP Paribas Masters after qualifying for both tournaments. Monaco ended the year ranked no. 46 in the world, 23 places lower than his year-end ranking in 2007.

In doubles, Monaco started the year with a win in the 2008 Heineken Open partnering Luis Horna. He reached the semifinals of 2008 US Open, losing to Lukáš Dlouhý and Leander Paes. He also reached the final of the 2008 Movistar Open and won the 2008 Open de Tenis Comunidad Valenciana, all partnering fellow Argentine Máximo González.

=== 2009 ===
In 2009, Monaco started the year in 2009 Heineken Open losing to Serbian Viktor Troicki in the second round and a quarterfinal appearance in the 2009 Movistar Open. He lost in the first round of 2009 Brasil Open, the 2009 Australian Open, and Acapulco. He reached his first final of the year in Buenos Aires at the 2009 Copa Telmex, losing to Tommy Robredo in a tight three-setter. In doubles, he reached the third round of the 2009 Australian Open and the final of 2009 Brasil Open, both partnering Lucas Arnold Ker

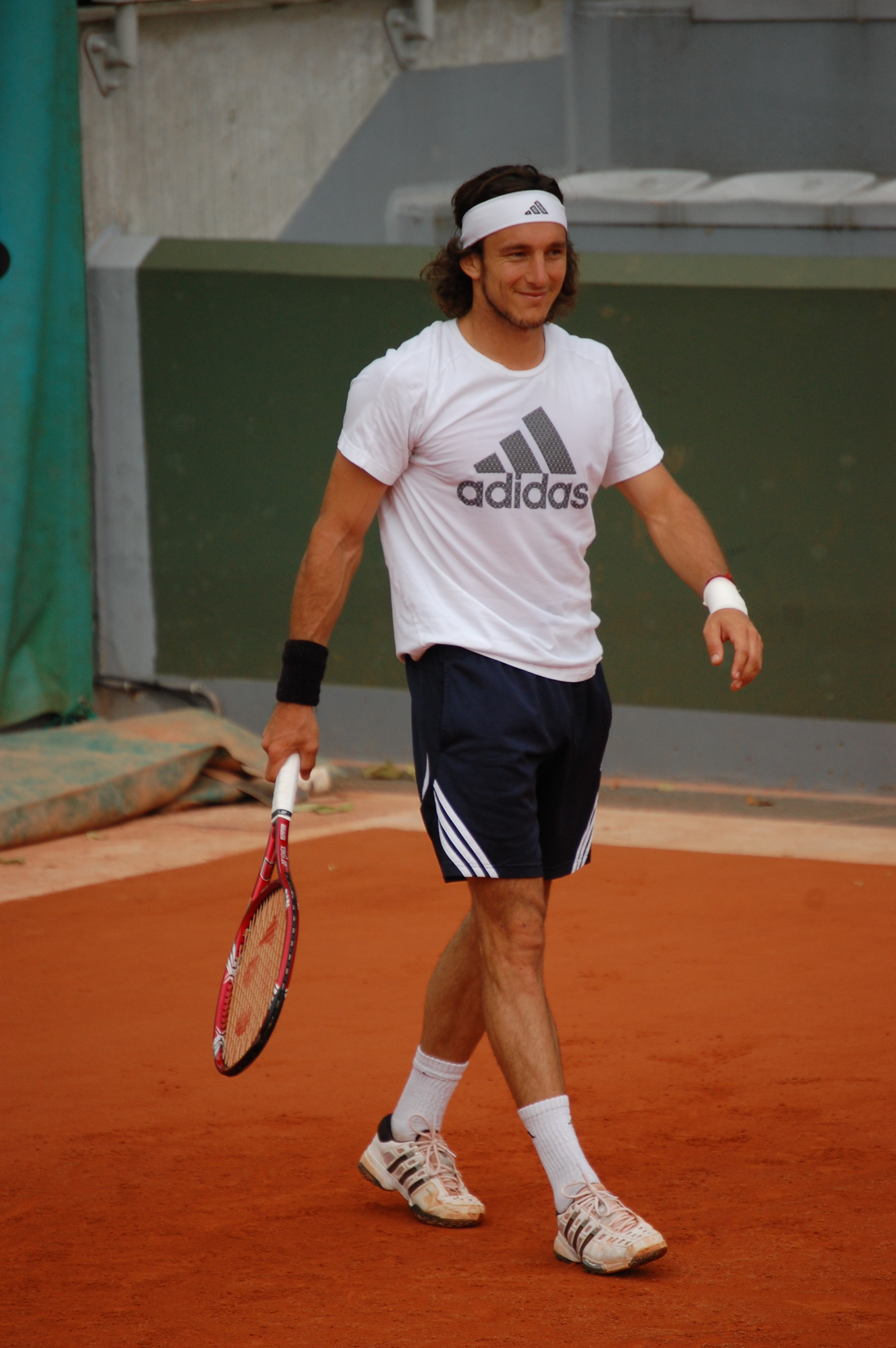
Juan Monaco in the second round of 2009 French Open

He represented Argentina in the Davis Cup, defeating Thiemo de Bakker of the Netherlands. He also reached the second round of the 2009 Sony Ericsson Open, losing to Andy Murray after winning the first set. He also reached the third round of the 2009 Monte-Carlo Rolex Masters, losing to German Andreas Beck, after defeating Tommy Robredo in the second round, and the 2009 Barcelona Open Banco Sabadell losing to Fernando González after defeating Marat Safin in the first round. He reached his first Masters quarterfinal at the 2009 Internazionali BNL d'Italia, entering as a qualifier and beating Andy Murray in the second round, Marin Čilić in the third round, but losing to Fernando González. He also reached the round of 16 at the 2009 Estoril Open and the 2009 Mutua Madrileña Madrid Open, where he faced three Spaniards losing to Fernando Verdasco after defeating Feliciano López and David Ferrer. He also represented Argentina along with Juan Martín del Potro and Máximo González at the 2009 ARAG World Team Cup, where he won his only singles match against Serbian Janko Tipsarević. He reached the second round of Roland Garros, losing to Jo-Wilfried Tsonga.

He lost in the first round of Wimbledon, still failing to capture his first win there, losing to Nicolás Almagro in a match that lasted almost four hours. He represented Argentina once again in the quarterfinals of the 2009 Davis Cup against the Czech Republic, losing both his matches. He then competed in the 2009 Swedish Open, defeating eighth seed Máximo González and dominating in his next three matches against Victor Crivoi, top seed Fernando Verdasco, and third seed and defending champion Tommy Robredo, before losing to Robin Söderling in the final. In the 2009 International German Open, he defeated Mikhail Youzhny and José Acasuso. He then lost to David Ferrer in the third round. Monaco competed directly in the 2009 US Open without competing in any events in 2009 US Open Series. He lost to eventual champion Juan Martín del Potro in the first round. At the 2009 BCR Open Romania, Monaco reached his third final of the year, but once again ended as runner-up to Albert Montañés, after defeating qualifiers Júlio Silva and Pere Riba, eighth seed Pablo Cuevas, and German Simon Greul. Because of this final appearance he ended the year with 29 wins on clay, the most wins on clay by any player. In the 2009 Rakuten Japan Open Tennis Championships, he retired against Ernests Gulbis in the second round after defeating Guillermo García López. He then lost to Victor Troicki in the first round of the 2009 Shanghai ATP Masters 1000. He lost to Joachim Johansson, after defeating Jan Hernych in the first round of the 2009 If Stockholm Open. He competed in the 2009 Grand Prix de Tennis de Lyon as the fourth seed, but was upset by Michaël Llodra in the second round after defeating Frenchman Josselin Ouanna in the first round. He lost in the second round of the 2009 Valencia Open 500 to Nikolay Davydenko. He then lost to Novak Djokovic, despite leading 5–3 in the second set, after defeating Jérémy Chardy in the 2009 BNP Paribas Masters. This was his last tournament of the year, reaching three finals; the most since winning three titles in 2007. He ended the year at no. 30.

=== 2010 ===
Monaco started 2010 with the Heineken Open, where he defeated Horacio Zeballos in the first round, but lost to eventual champion John Isner in three sets. He lost to sixth seed Nikolay Davydenko in the third round of the 2010 Australian Open, having defeated Ernests Gulbis and Michaël Llodra in five sets. He lost to Thomaz Bellucci in the final of the 2010 Movistar Open, after defeating Nicolas Massú, Juan Ignacio Chela, Peter Luczak, and João Souza. He lost to Juan Carlos Ferrero in the semifinals of the 2010 Copa Telmex just hours after defeating Horacio Zeballos in the quarterfinals, where he did not face a single break point. He also defeated Juan Ignacio Chela in the second round and Łukasz Kubot. He lost to Juan Carlos Ferrero in the semifinals of the 2010 Abierto Mexicano Telcel, retiring with an abdominal strain. He defeated top seed Fernando Verdasco in the quarterfinals, Juan Ignacio Chela for the second time in as many weeks, and Alberto Martín.

He defeated Fabio Fognini in the second round of the 2010 BNP Paribas Open. He then faced Juan Carlos Ferrero in the third round; this was their third straight meeting, with Ferrero prevailing in the other two. He upset Ferrero for the first time in a match than lasted over 3 hours. He then defeated Guillermo García López to reach his first hardcourt Master Series quarterfinal. He lost to eventual champion Ivan Ljubičić in a three-set match. In the 2010 Sony Ericsson Open, he lost in the third round to Fernando González, after defeating Marsel İlhan in the second round.

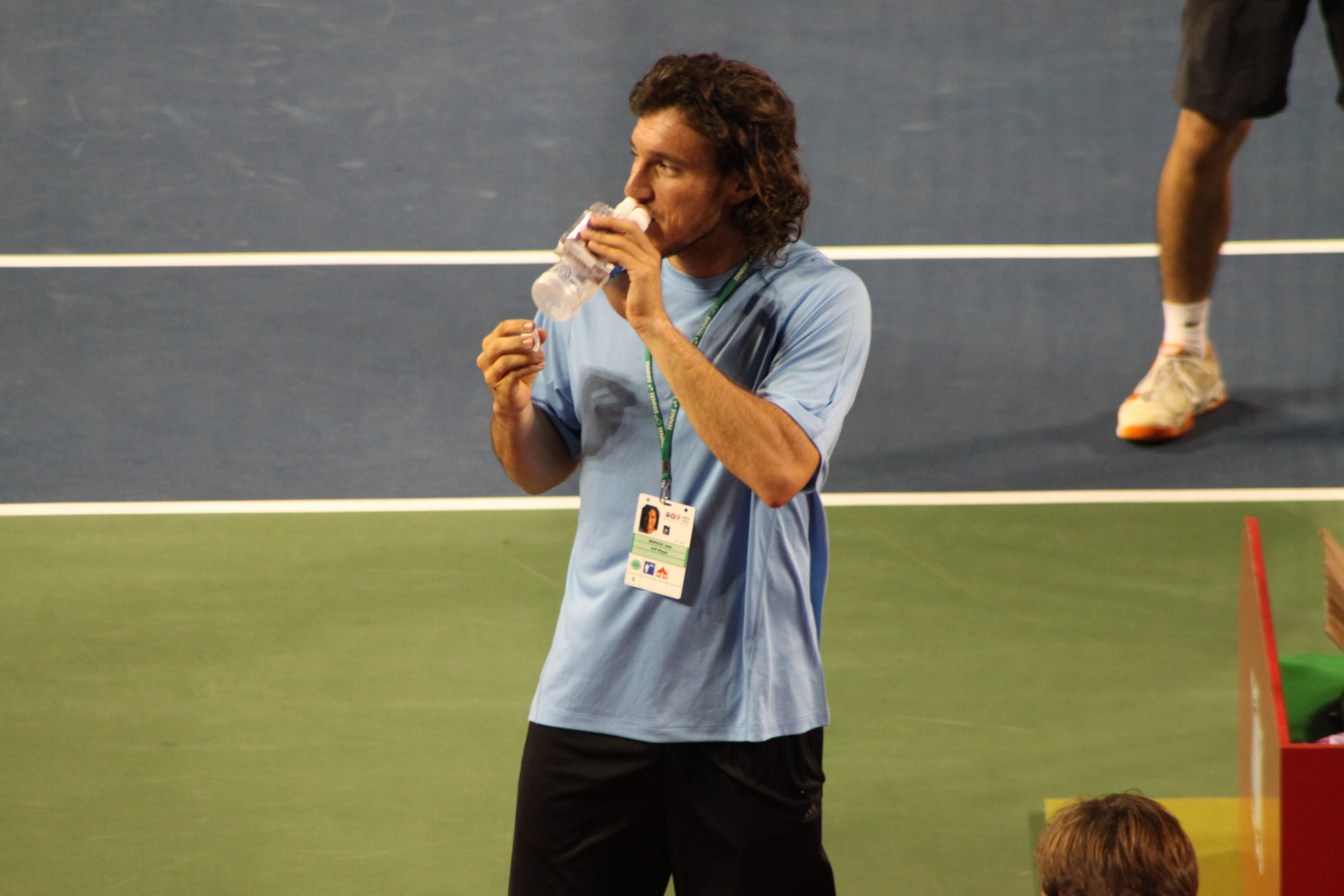
Juan Monaco at the Japan Open

In the 2010 Monte-Carlo Rolex Masters, he defeated qualifier Jarkko Nieminen for the first time in three meetings and was upset by Michael Berrer in the second round. His bad run continued as he was upset by Daniel Gimeno Traver in the first round as the tenth seed of the 2010 Barcelona Open Banco Sabadell. He defeated Igor Andreev, but lost to Victor Hănescu in the second round of the 2010 Internazionali BNL d'Italia. In the 2010 Mutua Madrileña Madrid Open, he defeated Simon Greul and Thomaz Bellucci. He then lost to Nicolás Almagro. He then led Argentina to their second ARAG World Team Cup. In the final he defeated American Sam Querrey. At the 2010 French Open, he was upset by qualifier Grega Žemlja in four sets in the first round. He then withdrew from the 2010 Wimbledon Championships due to a wrist injury and missed two months of action. He made his return in the 2010 Western & Southern Financial Group Masters in a losing effort to Thiemo de Bakker. He then lost in the first round of 2010 Pilot Pen Tennis, the US Open, and the 2010 Rakuten Japan Open Tennis Championships.

In October, he reached an ATP World Tour Masters 1000 semifinal for the first time in the 2010 Shanghai Rolex Masters 1000 by defeating Florent Serra 6–4, 7–6 Thiemo de Bakker 2–6, 6–3, 6–4, Mischa Zverev 6–2, 6–0 and Jürgen Melzer 6–7, 7–5, 6–2, but then lost to World No. 4 Andy Murray 6–4, 6–1. At the 2010 Valencia Open 500 he upset defending champion Andy Murray 6–2, 3–6, 6–2 in the second round but was then upset by Marcel Granollers 1–6, 6–3, 6–4 in the following round. Monaco, played his last tournament of the year at the BNP Paribas Masters where he defeated Sam Querrey 6–2, 7–6 but fell to no. 2 seed Novak Djokovic 6–4, 6–3 in the second round after failing to convert 7 of 8 break points.

=== 2011 ===
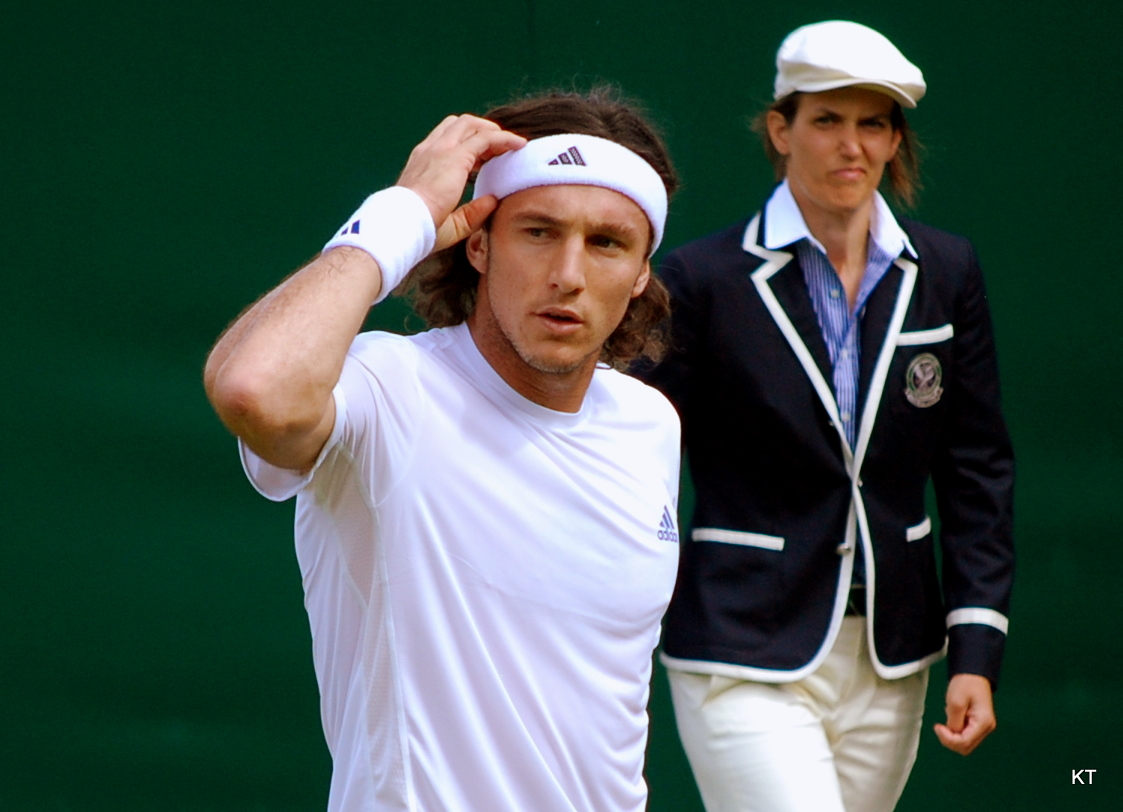
Juan Monaco at Wimbledon 2011

Monaco began his 2011 season at the 2011 Heineken Open as the fifth seed, but was upset by Adrian Mannarino. At the first Grand Slam of the year the Australian Open, he was upset by Robin Haase in the second round. In the South American clay season, he fell in the first round of 2011 Movistar Open to Máximo González and the quarterfinals of the 2011 Copa Claro and 2011 Abierto Mexicano Telcel, losing to Stanislas Wawrinka and David Ferrer, respectively. At the 2011 BNP Paribas Open, he was upset by American qualifier Ryan Sweeting in the second round after receiving a bye in the first round. At the 2011 Sony Ericsson Open, he fell to third seed Roger Federer in the third round.

In the European clay season, Monaco didn't have a lot of success. At the 2011 Monte-Carlo Rolex Masters, he lost to Jo-Wilfried Tsonga. He then fell in the second round of the 2011 Barcelona Open Banco Sabadell to Simone Vagnozzi. He then lost to Feliciano López in the first round of the 2011 Serbia Open. At the 2011 Mutua Madrid Open and 2011 Internazionali BNL d'Italia, he lost to Tomáš Berdych on both occasions, in the third round and second round, respectively. He then represented Argentina at the 2011 Power Horse World Team Cup, where they fell in the final to Germany. At Roland Garros, Monaco suffered a first-round exit at the hands of Fernando Verdasco. At Wimbledon, he lost in five sets to Mikhail Youzhny in the first round.

He then represented Argentina at the 2011 Davis Cup quarterfinal against Kazakhstan and won both his matches. He then had to withdraw from the second round 2011 Swedish Open due to a foot injury. At the 2011 International German Open, he reached the third round, losing to Florian Mayer. He then fell early at the 2011 Rogers Cup and 2011 Western & Southern Open. He then played at the 2011 Winston-Salem Open, losing to Andy Roddick in the quarterfinals. Monaco reached the fourth round of the US Open, before losing to Federer. He then lost three matches in a row, starting with the 2011 Davis Cup semifinal, in a dead rubber he retired to Janko Tipsarević after losing the first set 6–2, and the first round of the 2011 Rakuten Japan Open Tennis Championships and the 2011 Shanghai Rolex Masters. He then reached his first final in over a year and a half at the 2011 Valencia Open 500, but lost to Marcel Granollers after upsetting Nicolás Almagro in the first round and David Ferrer in the semifinals. He then continued his success at the 2011 BNP Paribas Masters, with wins over Gilles Simon and Mardy Fish, before losing to Roger Federer in the quarterfinals. He finished the year no. 26 in the world.

=== 2012 ===
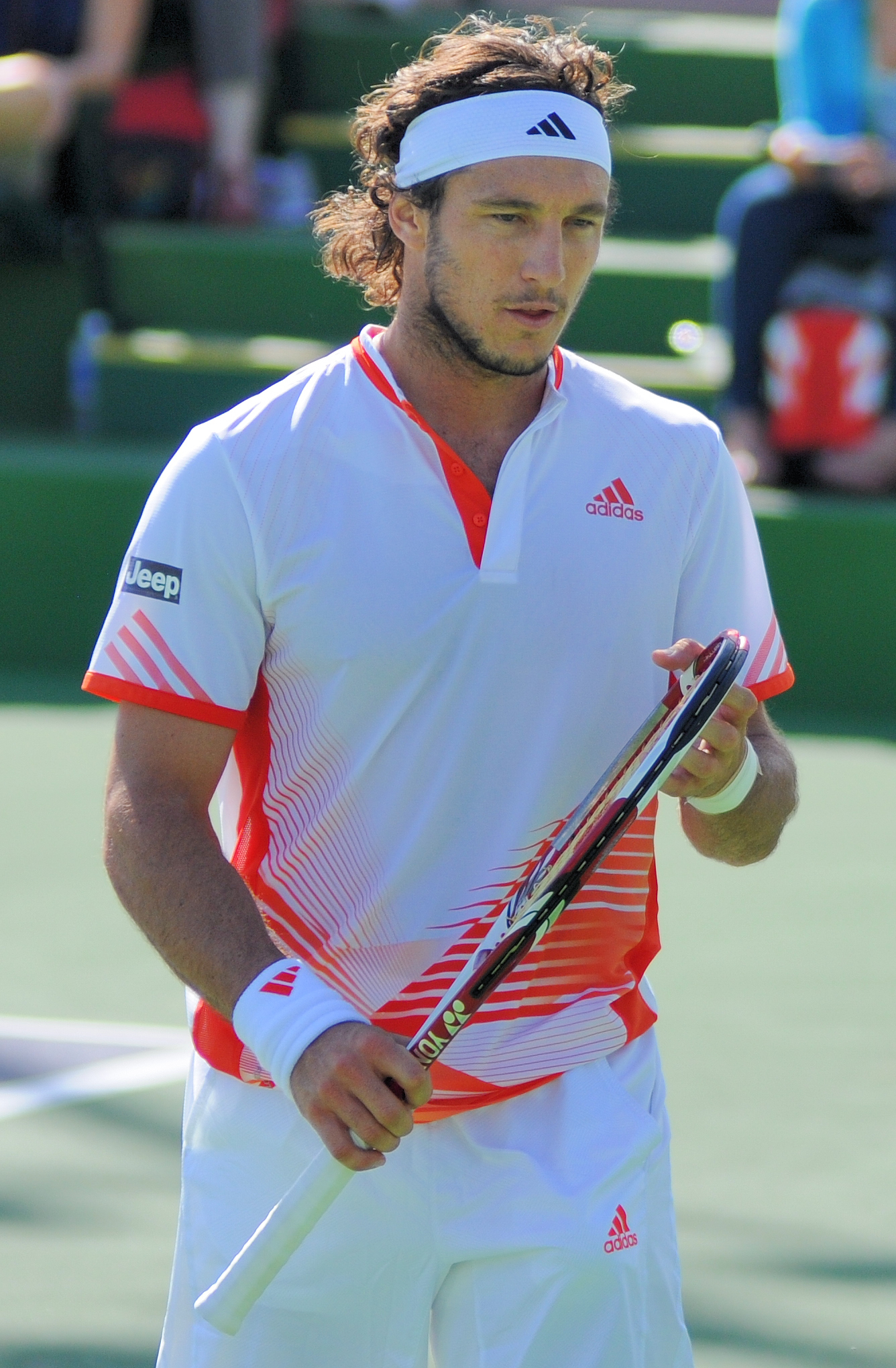
Monaco reached the semifinal of the Miami Masters.

Monaco began his 2012 campaign at the 2012 Australian Open as the 25th seed, but was upset by Philipp Kohlschreiber in the first round. He then competed in the 2012 VTR Open as the top seed. He received a first-round bye, then defeated Igor Andreev, Albert Montañés, Jérémy Chardy, and finally Carlos Berlocq in the final. This was his fourth title and first since 2007, It also ended his seven consecutive runner-up finishes. He then represented Argentina against Germany in the first round of the Davis Cup and won his only match against Philipp Petzschner. He then played at the 2012 Copa Claro, losing to compatriot David Nalbandian. He then retired in his first-round match at the 2012 Abierto Mexicano Telcel due to dehydration against Albert Ramos. At the first Masters of the year, the 2012 BNP Paribas Open, he fell in the third round to eventual finalist John Isner. At the 2012 Sony Ericsson Open, he fell to world no. 1 and defending champion Novak Djokovic in his second Masters semifinals, after wins over Lu Yen-hsun, 14th seed Gaël Monfils, 31st seed Andy Roddick, and 8th seed Mardy Fish. This performance pushed him to no. 16 in the world, his highest ranking since May 2008.

He then played in the 2012 U.S. Men's Clay Court Championships as the 4th seed and wild card. He beat Tatsuma Ito, Kevin Anderson, and Michael Russell to advance to the final. In the final, he faced second seed John Isner and won, to claim his second title of the year and fifth overall. He also matched his career-high ranking of no. 14 in the world after the win. He then played at the 2012 Monte-Carlo Rolex Masters, where he retired due to a right ankle injury in his first-round match against Robin Haase while leading by a break in the third. The injury also forced him to withdraw from the Barcelona Open and the Mutua Madrid Open.

He was seeded 14th in Rome and won his first two matches against Adrian Ungur, and Radek Štěpánek, before losing to defending champion and world no. 1 Novak Djokovic.

At the French Open, he first faced Frenchman Guillaume Rufin. He then cruised passed Lukáš Rosol. In the third round he had a tough match against the big-serving Canadian Milos Raonic and converted 3/16 break points and saved all break points he faced, the Argentinian won the match. He made it to the fourth round, where he lost to Rafael Nadal. He was broken twice in the first set and pulled a double bagel in the second and third, although he had a couple of break opportunities of his own in the second.

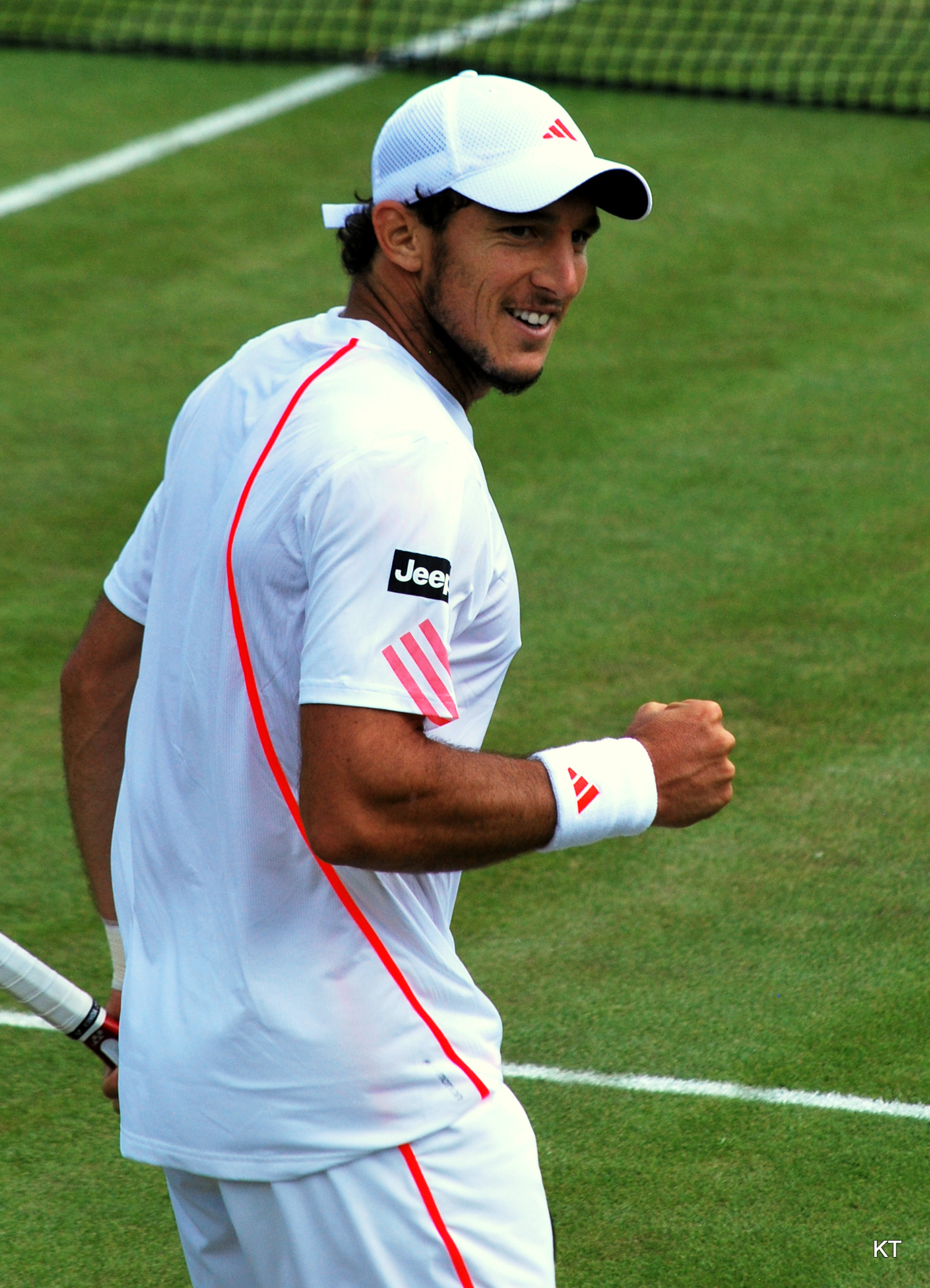
Monaco during his match with Viktor Troicki, on Day 5 of the 2012 Wimbledon Championships

At the 2012 Wimbledon Championships, he finally notched his first career win on grass by beating compatriot Leonardo Mayer in the first round. He then followed it up with a win over Jérémy Chardy. In the third round, he lost to Viktor Troicki despite leading the 1st set by a break and coming back from a break in the second.

Juan Monaco then played the 2012 MercedesCup, he cruised past Tobias Kamke and Pavol Červenák in straight sets after receiving a bye in the first round. He then faced Guillermo García-López and was leading 5–0 in the third set; he then lost 5 games in a row but eventually won 7–5. In the final he lost to top seed Janko Tipsarević, even after coming back from 1–4 in the second and had momentum in the third. He then played at the 2012 International German Open, he first met Cedrik-Marcel Stebe in the first round and won in three tight sets, being down 5–4 in the final set with Stebe serving for the match. He then won in straight sets against Daniel Muñoz de la Nava and Jérémy Chardy. In the semifinals he faced top seed Nicolás Almagro losing the first set, he came back and won the second. He was down 4–2 in the third but won the last 4 games to advance to the final. In the final he faced local man and wild card Tommy Haas and won being 4–1 down in the first. With the win he entered the top ten for the first time in his career.

He then played the Summer Olympics defeating David Goffin before losing to Feliciano López in the following round. He then suffered 4 loses in a row, losing in the second round of 2012 Rogers Cup to Mardy Fish, first round of the 2012 Western & Southern Open to Radek Štěpánek, first round of the 2012 US Open to Guillermo García López despite bring with two sets and a break up. He lost his fourth match in a row in the 2012 Davis Cup to Tomáš Berdych, Monaco led 4–2 in the fourth set and came back on serve after being down 4–0 in the fifth. At the 2012 Proton Malaysian Open he defeated Jimmy Wang, and Vasek Pospisil. In the semifinals, he defeated Kei Nishikori after coming back 5–2 in the final set. In the final he faced Julien Benneteau and claimed his first hard-court title. He lost to Fernando Verdasco in the second round of the 2012 Shanghai Masters.

2012 proved to be Monaco's best year so far, with four singles titles.

=== 2013 ===
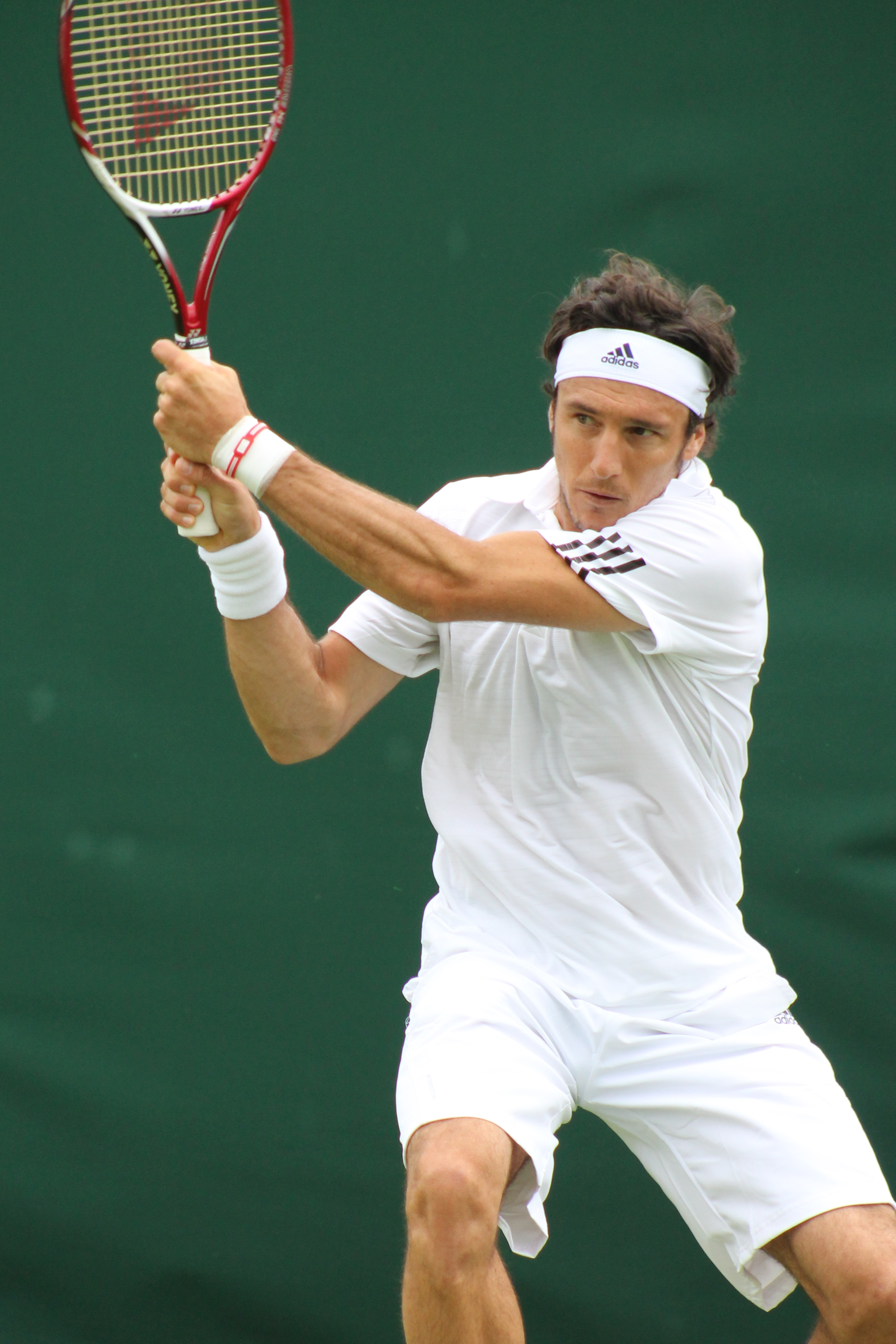
Monaco at Wimbledon.

He lost in the first round of the Australian Open to Andrey Kuznetsov, suffering with a back injury. He then continued to play singles in the Davis Cup against Germany, where he won both matches defeating Florian Mayer and Tobias Kamke, and his team won 5–0. In doubles, he played with Rafael Nadal in his comeback and reached the final of the VTR Open, losing to Italians Paolo Lorenzi and Potito Starace. Monaco made five first-round exits in the main draw of ATP events. In the Davis Cup quarterfinals against France, he hit back with a solid win over Gilles Simon in the second rubber, but lost his second match to Jo-Wilfried Tsonga.

He was the defending champion at the U.S. Men's Clay Court Championships, but in a rematch of the previous year's final, he lost to John Isner. He then followed it up with a third-round showing at the Monte-Carlo Rolex Masters, losing to eventual champion Novak Djokovic. At the Barcelona Open Banco Sabadell, he was able to reach the quarterfinals, losing to Nicolás Almagro. However, he fell early at the Mutua Madrid Open and the Internazionali BNL d'Italia. However, Monaco bounced back, beating Jarkko Nieminen to win the inaugural Power Horse Cup, which was his first title of the year. However, in his next match at the French Open he lost in the first round to Daniel Gimeno Traver having led by two sets to love. He had thus failed to win a single Grand Slam match since first entering the top 10 in the world rankings. Monaco ended this run at Wimbledon in 2013 by reaching the third round for the second year in succession, where he was defeated by Kenny de Schepper.

He then made three consecutive quarterfinal appearances: at the Swedish Open, losing to Grigor Dimitrov, International German Open, losing to Nicolás Almagro, and at the Crédit Agricole Suisse Open Gstaad, losing to Mikhail Youzhny. He reached his second final of the year at the Bet-at-home Cup Kitzbühel, but lost to Marcel Granollers. He then withdrew from the Rogers Cup and lost in the second round of the Western & Southern Open to Novak Djokovic. At the Winston-Salem Open, he lost in the third round to Alexandr Dolgopolov. At the US Open, he retired in the first round with a stomachache and headache against Florian Mayer. In the Davis Cup semifinal against the Czech Republic, he lost his only match against Radek Štěpánek. In his final tournament of the year at the Rakuten Japan Open Tennis Championships, he lost to Jarkko Nieminen. Monaco withdrew from events for the rest of the year due to a wrist injury. As a result, he ended the year as no.42.

=== 2014–2016 ===
In 2014, Monaco failed to win consecutively until May in Düsseldorf, where he was the defending champion. He reach the quarterfinals after beating Benjamin Becker and Marcel Granollers. After the tournament, his ranking was down to no. 76 due to the loss of points he had been defending. At Gstaad, he defeated Guillermo García López and Robin Haase on the way to the final, where he was beaten by Pablo Andújar.

He reached the semifinals in Kitzbühel, where he was beaten by Dominic Thiem. He made a first-round exit at the US Open, falling to Jo-Wilfried Tsonga.

He made it to the semifinals of the Shenzhen Open, beating Richard Gasquet in the quarterfinals, but unable to overcome Andy Murray. At the 2014 Shanghai Rolex Masters, he defeated João Sousa and eighth-seeded Milos Raonic to reach the third round, where he lost to Mikhail Youzhny. He ended the year at the Kremlin Cup, again losing to Youzhny in the second round.

January 2015 was not a good month for Monaco, as he failed to make it past the first round of any tournament. In February, he made it to the quarterfinals of the Rio Open, falling to David Ferrer. He had continued success on the South American clay courts at the Argentina Open, making it to the final against Rafael Nadal, but unable to overcome him.

Monaco made it to the third round at Indian Wells and the quarterfinals in Miami, falling to Thanasi Kokkinakis and Tomáš Berdych, respectively.

He made a series of second-round exits on the European clay courts, until Nice, where he made the quarterfinals. Then, he made another series of second-round exits, including at Roland Garros and Wimbledon. He did not make past the second round for the rest of the year, and finished the year with a first round loss to Robin Haase.

Monaco started 2016 with a second-round loss to Rafael Nadal in Buenos Aires and a first-round loss to Daniel Gimeno Traver in Rio de Janeiro. After two disappointing Masters 1000, Monaco won his first tournament since 2013 in Houston, beating Jack Sock in the final in three sets. In May, after losing at the Masters in Madrid, Monaco defeated Stan Wawrinka at the Rome Masters, but pulled out in the quarterfinals. The rest of the season was not successful, failing to make it past the second round in any tournament, save at the Japan Open, where he made it to the quarterfinals. He played one tie Argentina's successful Davis Cup campaign of 2016, losing his match in the Quarter Finals, but being a part of the team overall to win the 2016 Davis Cup.

=== 2017: Retirement ===
Monaco began his season at Indian Wells, losing in the first round to Adrian Mannarino. He was no more successful at the Miami Open, also losing in the first round, this time to Federico Delbonis. In April, Monaco lost to Dustin Brown in the first round in Houston, and announced his retirement the following month on 15 May.

== Endorsements ==
Monaco wore Adidas sportswear, and played with a Yonex VCore Xi 98 racquet.

== ATP career finals ==
=== Singles: 21 (9 titles, 12 runner-ups) ===
Legend Grand Slam tournaments (0–0) Tennis Masters Cup / ATP World Tour Finals (0–0) ATP Masters Series / ATP World Tour Masters 1000 (0–0) ATP International Series Gold / ATP World Tour 500 Series (2–1) ATP International Series / ATP World Tour 250 Series (7–11)	Titles by surface Hard (1–1) Clay (8–11) Grass (0–0) Carpet (0–0)	Titles by setting Outdoor (8–11) Indoor (1–1)

Result	W–L	Date	Tournament	Tier	Surface	Opponent	Score
Loss	0–1	Apr 2005	Grand Prix Hassan II, Morocco	International	Clay	(Argentina) Mariano Puerta	4–6, 1–6
Win	1–1	Feb 2007	Argentina Open, Argentina	International	Clay	(Italy) Alessio di Mauro	6–1, 6–2
Win	2–1	May 2007	Pörtschach Open, Austria	International	Clay	(France) Gaël Monfils	7–6^{(7–3)}, 6–0
Win	3–1	Jul 2007	Austrian Open, Austria	Intl. Gold	Clay	(Italy) Potito Starace	5–7, 6–3, 6–4
Loss	3–2	Feb 2008	Chile Open, Chile	International	Clay	(Chile) Fernando González	Walkover
Loss	3–3	May 2008	Pörtschach Open, Austria	International	Clay	(Russia) Nikolay Davydenko	2–6, 6–2, 2–6
Loss	3–4	Feb 2009	Argentina Open, Argentina	250 Series	Clay	(Spain) Tommy Robredo	5–7, 6–2, 6–7^{(5–7)}
Loss	3–5	Jul 2009	Swedish Open, Sweden	250 Series	Clay	(Sweden) Robin Söderling	3–6, 6–7^{(4–7)}
Loss	3–6	Sep 2009	Romanian Open, Romania	250 Series	Clay	(Spain) Albert Montañés	6–7^{(2–7)}, 6–7^{(6–8)}
Loss	3–7	Feb 2010	Chile Open, Chile	250 Series	Clay	(Brazil) Thomaz Bellucci	2–6, 6–0, 4–6
Loss	3–8	Nov 2011	Valencia Open, Spain	500 Series	Hard (i)	(Spain) Marcel Granollers	2–6, 6–4, 6–7^{(3–7)}
Win	4–8	Feb 2012	Chile Open, Chile	250 Series	Clay	(Argentina) Carlos Berlocq	6–3, 6–7^{(1–7)}, 6–1
Win	5–8	Apr 2012	U.S. Men's Clay Court Championships, US	250 Series	Clay	(United States) John Isner	6–2, 3–6, 6–3
Loss	5–9	Jul 2012	Stuttgart Open, Germany	250 Series	Clay	(Serbia) Janko Tipsarević	4–6, 7–5, 3–6
Win	6–9	Jul 2012	German Championships, Germany	500 Series	Clay	(Germany) Tommy Haas	7–5, 6–4
Win	7–9	Sep 2012	Malaysian Open, Malaysia	250 Series	Hard (i)	(France) Julien Benneteau	7–5, 4–6, 6–3
Win	8–9	May 2013	Düsseldorf Open, Germany	250 Series	Clay	(Finland) Jarkko Nieminen	6–4, 6–3
Loss	8–10	Aug 2013	Austrian Open, Austria	250 Series	Clay	(Spain) Marcel Granollers	6–0, 6–7^{(3–7)}, 4–6
Loss	8–11	Jul 2014	Swiss Open, Switzerland	250 Series	Clay	(Spain) Pablo Andújar	3–6, 5–7
Loss	8–12	Mar 2015	Argentina Open, Argentina	250 Series	Clay	(Spain) Rafael Nadal	4–6, 1–6
Win	9–12	Apr 2016	U.S. Men's Clay Court Championships, US (2)	250 Series	Clay	(United States) Jack Sock	3–6, 6–3, 7–5

=== Doubles: 6 (3 titles, 3 runner-ups) ===
Legend Grand Slam tournaments (0–0) Tennis Masters Cup / ATP World Tour Finals (0–0) ATP Masters Series / ATP World Tour Masters 1000 (0–0) ATP International Series Gold / ATP World Tour 500 Series (0–0) ATP International Series / ATP World Tour 250 Series (3–3)	Titles by surface Hard (2–0) Clay (1–3) Grass (0–0) Carpet (0–0)	Titles by setting Outdoor (3–3) Indoor (0–0)

Result	W–L	Date	Tournament	Tier	Surface	Partner	Opponents	Score
Win	1–0	Jan 2008	Auckland Open, New Zealand	International	Hard	(Peru) Luis Horna	(Belgium) Xavier Malisse (Austria) Jürgen Melzer	6–4, 3–6, [10–7]
Loss	1–1	Feb 2008	Chile Open, Chile	International	Clay	(Argentina) Máximo González	(Argentina) José Acasuso (Argentina) Sebastián Prieto	1–6, 0–3 ret.
Win	2–1	Apr 2008	Valencia Open, Spain	International	Clay	(Argentina) Máximo González	(United States) Travis Parrott (Slovakia) Filip Polášek	7–5, 7–5
Loss	2–2	Feb 2009	Brasil Open, Brazil	250 Series	Clay	(Argentina) Lucas Arnold Ker	(Spain) Marcel Granollers (Spain) Tommy Robredo	4–6, 5–7
Loss	2–3	Feb 2013	Chile Open, Chile	250 Series	Clay	(Spain) Rafael Nadal	(Italy) Paolo Lorenzi (Italy) Potito Starace	2–6, 4–6
Win	3–3	Jan 2015	Qatar Open, Qatar	250 Series	Hard	(Spain) Rafael Nadal	(Austria) Julian Knowle (Austria) Philipp Oswald	6–3, 6–4

== Team competition finals: 1 (1 runner-up) ==
Result	No.	Date	Tournament	Surface	Partner	Opponents	Score
Runner-up	1.	2–4 December 2011	Davis Cup, Seville, Spain	Clay (i)	(Argentina) David Nalbandian (Argentina) Juan Martín del Potro (Argentina) Eduardo Schwank	(Spain) Rafael Nadal (Spain) David Ferrer (Spain) Fernando Verdasco (Spain) Feliciano López	1–3

== Performance timelines ==
Key
W	F	SF	QF	#R	RR	Q#	DNQ	A	NH

(W) winner; (F) finalist; (SF) semifinalist; (QF) quarterfinalist; (#R) rounds 4, 3, 2, 1; (RR) round-robin stage; (Q#) qualification round; (DNQ) did not qualify; (A) absent; (NH) not held; (SR) strike rate (events won / competed); (W–L) win–loss record.

=== Singles ===
Tournament	2004	2005	2006	2007	2008	2009	2010	2011	2012	2013	2014	2015	2016	2017	SR	W–L	Win %
Grand Slam tournaments
Australian Open	A	1R	2R	1R	3R	1R	3R	2R	1R	1R	1R	1R	A	A	0 / 11	6–11	35%
French Open	2R	1R	3R	4R	1R	2R	1R	1R	4R	1R	2R	2R	2R	A	0 / 13	13–13	50%
Wimbledon	A	1R	A	1R	A	1R	A	1R	3R	3R	A	2R	2R	A	0 / 8	6–8	42%
US Open	1R	1R	1R	4R	1R	1R	1R	4R	1R	1R	1R	A	1R	A	0 / 12	6–12	33%
Win–loss	1–2	0–4	3–3	6–4	2–3	1–4	2–3	4–4	5–4	2–4	1–3	2–3	2–3	0–0	0 / 44	31–44	41%
ATP World Tour Masters 1000
Indian Wells	A	2R	A	1R	3R	A	QF	2R	3R	2R	2R	3R	1R	1R	0 / 11	9–11	45%
Miami	3R	1R	1R	2R	3R	2R	3R	3R	SF	2R	1R	QF	2R	1R	0 / 14	16–14	53%
Monte Carlo	A	A	A	A	2R	3R	2R	1R	1R	3R	A	2R	A	A	0 / 7	7–7	50%
Madrid^{1}	A	2R	2R	2R	3R	3R	3R	3R	A	2R	2R	2R	1R	A	0 / 11	14–11	56%
Rome	A	2R	1R	A	2R	QF	2R	2R	3R	1R	1R	2R	QF	A	0 / 11	13–10	56%
Canada	A	A	A	A	A	A	A	1R	3R	A	A	A	A	A	0 / 2	1–2	33%
Cincinnati	A	A	A	3R	A	A	1R	2R	2R	2R	A	A	2R	A	0 / 6	5–6	45%
Shanghai^{2}	A	Q1	A	3R	1R	1R	SF	1R	2R	A	3R	A	A	A	0 / 7	8–7	53%
Paris	A	A	A	1R	2R	2R	2R	QF	3R	A	A	A	A	A	0 / 6	7–6	53%
Win–loss	2–1	3–4	1–3	6–6	7–7	9–6	13–8	8–9	9–8	4–6	4–5	9–5	5–4	0–2	0 / 75	80–74	51%
National Representation
Summer Olympics	A	Not Held			1R	Not Held			2R	Not Held			2R	NH	0 / 3	2–3	40%
Davis Cup	QF	A	A	A	F	QF	SF	F	SF	SF	PO	A	W	A	1 / 8	11–12	47%
Career statistics
Tournaments played	13	25	23	22	21	25	20	25	23	22	20	19	14	3	275		
Titles	0	0	0	3	0	0	0	0	4	1	0	0	1	0	9		
Finals reached	0	1	0	3	2	3	1	1	5	2	1	1	1	0	21		
Overall win–loss	16–13	17–25	18–23	41–19	28–20	36–26	30–20	31–27	40–19	25–23	22–20	21–19	17–14	0–3	342–271		55%
Win (%)	55%	40%	43%	68%	58%	58%	60%	53%	67%	52%	52%	52%	54%	0%	55.79%		
Year-end ranking	72	88	70	23	47	30	26	26	12	42	62	53	65	NR			

^{1}Held as Hamburg Masters until 2008, Madrid Masters (clay) 2009–present.
^{2}Held as Madrid Masters (hardcourt) from 2002 to 2008, and Shanghai Masters 2009–present.

=== Doubles ===
Tournament	2004	2005	2006	2007	2008	2009	2010	2011	2012	2013	2014	2015	2016	2017	W–L
Grand Slam tournaments
Australian Open	A	1R	1R	A	1R	3R	A	2R	A	A	A	1R	A	A	3–6
French Open	A	1R	A	1R	A	A	A	A	A	A	QF	A	A	A	3–3
Wimbledon	A	1R	A	A	A	1R	A	A	A	A	A	A	A	A	0–2
US Open	1R	A	A	1R	SF	2R	A	1R	A	A	1R	A	A	A	5–6
Win–loss	0–1	0–3	0–1	0–2	4–2	3–3	0–0	1–2	0-0	0-0	3-2	0-1	0-0	0-0	11-17

== Top 10 wins ==
Season	2004	2005	2006	2007	2008	2009	2010	2011	2012	2013	2014	2015	2016	2017	Total
Wins	0	0	0	4	0	3	2	4	3	1	1	1	1	0	20

#	Player	Rank	Event	Surface	Rd	Score
2007
1.	(Russia) Nikolay Davydenko	4	Pörtschach, Austria	Clay	QF	6–2, 6–7^{(5–7)}, 6–4
2.	(Spain) Tommy Robredo	7	Kitzbühel, Austria	Clay	QF	6–2, 2–6, 6–2
3.	(Spain) Rafael Nadal	2	Cincinnati, United States	Hard	2R	7–6^{(7–5)}, 4–1, ret.
4.	(Germany) Tommy Haas	10	Madrid, Spain	Hard (i)	2R	6–4, 7–5
2009
5.	(Argentina) David Nalbandian	10	Buenos Aires, Argentina	Clay	SF	2–6, 7–5, 7–6^{(7–2)}
6.	(United Kingdom) Andy Murray	4	Rome, Italy	Clay	2R	1–6, 6–3, 7–5
7.	(Spain) Fernando Verdasco	9	Båstad, Sweden	Clay	QF	6–1, 3–1, ret.
2010
8.	(Spain) Fernando Verdasco	10	Acapulco, Mexico	Clay	QF	7–5, 6–3
9.	(United Kingdom) Andy Murray	4	Valencia, Spain	Hard (i)	2R	6–2, 3–6, 6–2
2011
10.	(France) Gaël Monfils	10	Madrid, Spain	Clay	2R	6–2, 3–0, ret.
11.	(United States) Mardy Fish	10	World Team Cup, Düsseldorf, Germany	Clay	RR	7–6^{(7–4)}, 7–5
12.	(Spain) David Ferrer	5	Valencia, Spain	Hard (i)	SF	7–5, 1–6, 6–3
13.	(United States) Mardy Fish	9	Paris, France	Hard (i)	3R	1–6, 7–6^{(8–6)}, 1–2, ret.
2012
14.	(United States) Mardy Fish	8	Miami, United States	Hard	QF	6–1, 6–3
15.	(United States) John Isner	10	Houston, United States	Clay	F	6–2, 3–6, 6–3
16.	(Spain) Nicolás Almagro	10	Hamburg, Germany	Clay	SF	3–6, 6–3, 6–4
2013
17.	(Serbia) Janko Tipsarević	10	Madrid, Spain	Clay	1R	7–6^{(7–5)}, 6–3
2014
18.	(Canada) Milos Raonic	8	Shanghai, China	Hard	2R	5–2, ret.
2015
19.	(Croatia) Marin Čilić	10	Indian Wells, United States	Hard	2R	6–4, 6–4
2016
20.	(Switzerland) Stan Wawrinka	4	Rome, Italy	Clay	3R	6–7^{(5–7)}, 6–3, 6–4

== ATP Tour career earnings ==
- As of 8 April 2013:

Year	Grand Slam singles titles	ATP singles titles	Total singles titles	Earnings ($)	Money list rank
2004	0	0	0	$194,712	118
2005	0	0	0	$284,361	86
2006	0	0	0	$267,330	94
2007	0	3	3	$695,945	25
2008	0	0	0	$555,206	50
2009	0	0	0	$689,637	34
2010	0	0	0	$761,309	30
2011	0	0	0	$872,640	30
2012	0	4	4	$1,358,704	11
2013	0	1	1	$693,977	50
Career	0	8	8	$6,398,060	89
