= Julian Knowle =

Austrian tennis player (born 1974)

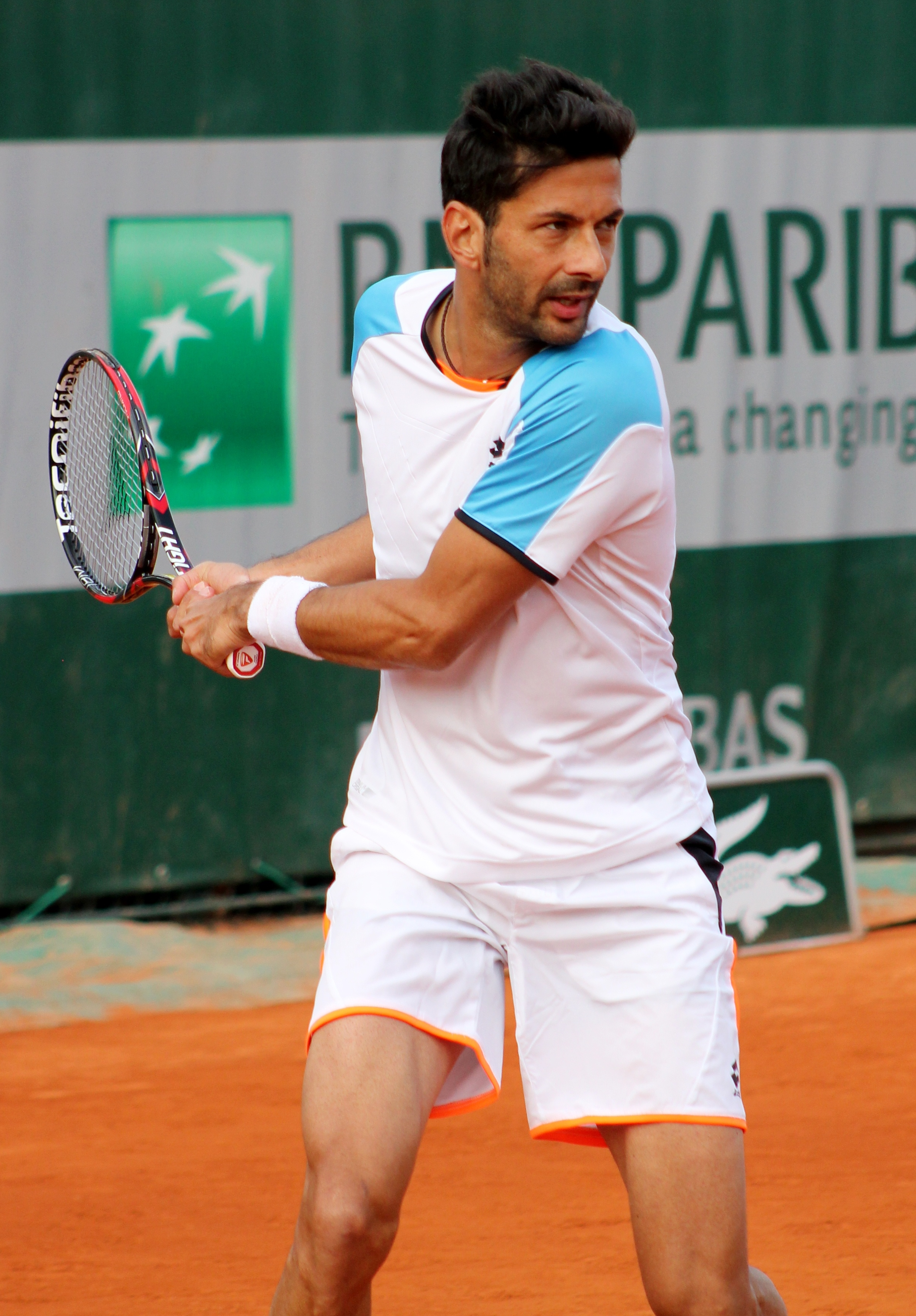
- Country (sports): Austria
- Residence: Hard, Austria
- Born: 29 April 1974 (age 52) Lauterach, Austria
- Height: 1.88 m (6 ft 2 in)
- Turned pro: 1992
- Retired: 2021
- Plays: Left-handed (two-handed both sides)
- Prize money: $3,048,871

Singles
- Career record: 10–33
- Career titles: 0
- Highest ranking: No. 86 (15 July 2002)

Grand Slam singles results
- Australian Open: 2R (2003)
- French Open: 1R (2002)
- Wimbledon: 3R (2002)
- US Open: 1R (2002)

Doubles
- Career record: 410–368
- Career titles: 19
- Highest ranking: No. 6 (7 January 2008)

Grand Slam doubles results
- Australian Open: 3R (2006, 2007)
- French Open: SF (2010)
- Wimbledon: F (2004)
- US Open: W (2007)

Other doubles tournaments
- Tour Finals: F (2007)
- Olympic Games: 2R (2008)

Grand Slam mixed doubles results
- Australian Open: QF (2007)
- French Open: F (2010)
- Wimbledon: QF (2010)
- US Open: 2R (2006, 2010)
- Last updated on: 1 December 2021.

Julian Knowle (born 29 April 1974) is an Austrian former professional tennis player. Being a born left-hander, Knowle was one of the few on the ATP Tour who played his forehand, backhand, and even volleys double-handed. He was Austria's most successful doubles player in history by reaching world No. 6 in the ATP doubles rankings in January 2008, before being matched by Jürgen Melzer, who reached No. 6 in September 2010, and overtaken only by Alexander Peya, who reached No. 3 in August 2013.

== Tennis career ==
Knowle was a successful player on the ATP Challenger Series, winning the Challenger tournaments in Kyoto (1999), Caracas (2001), Graz (2001), and Andrezieux (2002), and reaching the finals in Yokohama (2000), Bristol (2000), Besançon (2000), and Graz (2003). He also won several Futures tournaments. Knowle's best ATP singles ranking was world no. 86 in July 2002. His final appearance in the main draw of a singles tournament was in the Graz Challenger in 2005 where he reached the quarterfinals.

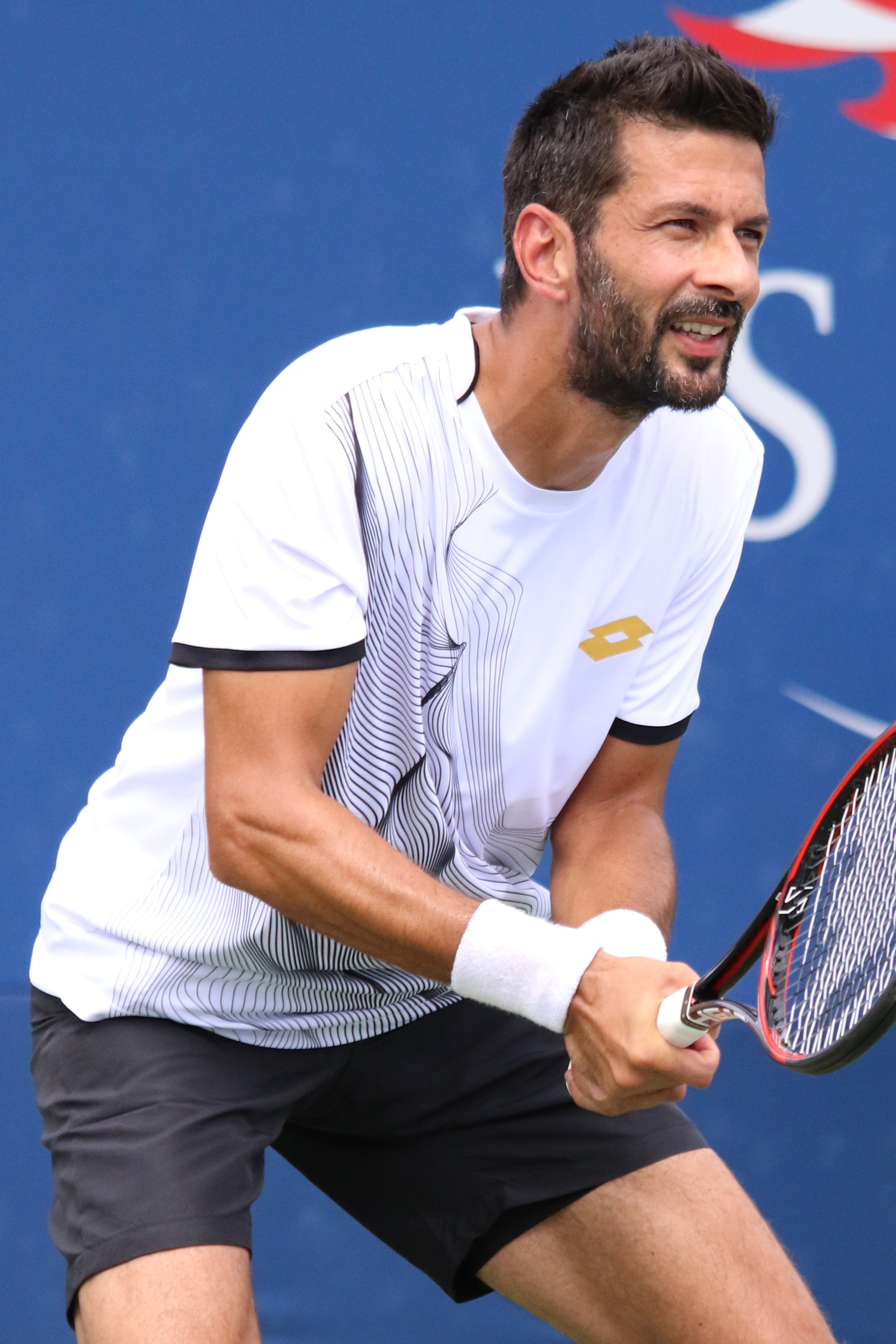
Knowle, 2016

=== 2004 ===
Knowle reached his first of two Grand Slam finals at Wimbledon in 2004 with Nenad Zimonjić of Serbia. Eventually, the team was defeated in four sets by Jonas Björkman and Todd Woodbridge. The only Austrian to reach a final at Wimbledon before was Georg von Metaxa in doubles in 1938, where he too lost.

=== 2005-2006 ===
In 2005 Knowle teamed up with Czech Petr Pála for several months without being able to continue his successful run with Zimonjić. This changed when he formed a team with fellow Austrian player and left-hander Jürgen Melzer, joining him throughout most of 2005 and 2006. Together, they won two tournaments in doubles and reached another five finals.

=== 2007 ===
Following Melzer's hand injury in early 2007, Knowle found a new partner in Simon Aspelin of Sweden.

At the 2007 US Open, seeded tenth with Aspelin, Knowle achieved the greatest triumph of his career by winning the tournament, his first Grand Slam. In the first two rounds, they won over Kubot/Skoch and got a walkover over Calleri/Horna. They went on to upset eighth seeds Jonathan Erlich and Andy Ram (who would go on to win the 2008 Australian Open men's doubles) in the third round. In the quarterfinals, they shocked the top seeds Bob and Mike Bryan, having lost to them only weeks before. In the semifinals, they held off unseeded Julien Benneteau and Nicolas Mahut, 7–6^{(2)}, 1–6, 6–3, before winning the final 7–5, 6–4 over the ninth seeds, Pavel Vízner and Lukáš Dlouhý. They had previously won three tournaments together. This win put them into the no. 5 position in the ATP Doubles Race, and also gave Knowle his first top-10 ranking in doubles.

Knowle was the second of so-far four Austrian tennis players to win a Grand Slam tournament (the first in doubles). The first Austrian to win a Grand Slam tournament was Thomas Muster at the 1995 French Open; the third was Jürgen Melzer, who won the 2010 Wimbledon Championships – Men's doubles and later the 2011 US Open – Men's doubles with his German partner Philipp Petzschner as well as the 2011 Wimbledon Championships - Mixed doubles with his later wife Iveta Benešová; the fourth was Dominic Thiem, who won the 2020 US Open - Men's Singles tournament.

Their first year as a team enabled Knowle and Aspelin to participate in the Tennis Masters Cup in Shanghai, China for the first time. They made it all the way to the final, beating Pavel Vízner and Lukáš Dlouhý, Arnaud Clément and Michaël Llodra, and finally Martin Damm and Leander Paes, before falling in straight sets to Mark Knowles and Daniel Nestor 2–6, 3–6.

Their first Masters Cup participation put the duo into the no. 3 spot of the ATP Doubles Race for the first time.

In December 2007, Knowle suffered acute hearing loss.

=== 2008 ===
Knowle and Aspelin were not able to continue their successful 2007 run, reaching five semifinals together in the 2008 season and reaching the third round of the French Open as their best Grand Slam result.

With Jürgen Melzer, Knowle participated at the 2008 Olympic Games in Beijing. They defeated the German duo of Nicolas Kiefer and Rainer Schüttler in three sets in the first round, before being knocked out of the tournament by Bob and Mike Bryan, 6–7^{(2)}, 4–6.

=== 2009 ===
Starting early 2009, Knowle formed a team with fellow Austrian Jürgen Melzer once more, though occasionally also teaming with other players. Knowle and Melzer enjoyed little success on the tour in the first half of 2009, before their performance improved significantly in the later weeks, winning titles in New Haven and Tokyo and reaching another final in Vienna. Their success came too late in the year for them to qualify for the Masters Cup.

=== 2010 ===
In 2010, Knowle played the first months of the year with Sweden's Robert Lindstedt. Together, they reached the doubles final in Marseille, where they lost in straight sets. Due to little success on the tour together, Knowle and Lindstedt parted ways, with Knowle teaming with Andy Ram from Israel. Their best performance came at the French Open, where they surprisingly reached the semifinals.

=== 2011 ===
Knowle's 2011 season was plagued by numerous injuries. Following a groin injury, he teamed up once more with Simon Aspelin, but they had little success. A torn muscle fascicle in April ended their partnership, forcing Knowle to pause for six weeks. His planned return to the tour failed, when a partially torn tendon prevented his participation in the French Open to defend his semifinal success from the previous year.

=== 2012 ===
After dropping out of the top 80 of doubles players in late 2011 for the first time in 10 years, Knowle slowly made his way back to the top 50 in 2012, teaming with several different partners, including Michael Kohlmann, Paul Hanley, František Čermák, and Filip Polášek. He reached the doubles final in Estoril with David Marrero and won the Kitzbühel tournament with Cermak, claiming his first title since Tokyo in 2009. He also reached the quarterfinals at Wimbledon with Daniele Bracciali, and did the same at the US Open with Polášek.

At the Malaysian Open in Kuala Lumpur, Knowle made a surprise return to singles competition, surviving three qualifying rounds (including a first-round bye) to become the oldest player to ever qualify for an ATP tournament at age 38. He lost in the first round to Albert Ramos in straight sets.

=== 2013 ===
In April, Knowle won the Grand Prix Hassan II in Casablanca with Filip Polášek, winning the final over the German team of Dustin Brown and Christopher Kas.

=== 2020-2021 ===
In November 2020, he accompanied Kevin Krawietz and Andreas Mies as a coach at the 2020 ATP Finals.

In February 2021, Knowle competed in the Australian Open, marking his first Grand Slam appearance since 2017. Knowle and Lloyd Harris lost in the first round to the pairing of Nick Kyrgios and Thanasi Kokkinakis.

His last ATP event was the 2021 French Open. He officially retired in November 2021.

== Performance timelines ==
Key
W	F	SF	QF	#R	RR	Q#	P#	DNQ	A	Z#	PO	G	S	B	NMS	NTI	P	NH

(W) winner; (F) finalist; (SF) semifinalist; (QF) quarterfinalist; (#R) rounds 4, 3, 2, 1; (RR) round-robin stage; (Q#) qualification round; (P#) preliminary round; (DNQ) did not qualify; (A) absent; (Z#) Davis/Fed Cup Zonal Group (with number indication) or (PO) play-off; (G) gold, (S) silver or (B) bronze Olympic/Paralympic medal; (NMS) not a Masters tournament; (NTI) not a Tier I tournament; (P) postponed; (NH) not held; (SR) strike rate (events won / competed); (W–L) win–loss record.
To avoid confusion and double counting, these charts are updated at the conclusion of a tournament or when the player's participation has ended.

=== Singles ===
Tournament	1998	1999	2000	2001	2002	2003	2004	2005	2006–2021	SR	W–L	Win%
Grand Slam tournaments
Australian Open	A	Q1	Q3	Q2	Q1	2R	Q1	Q2	A	0 / 1	1–1	50%
French Open	Q1	Q1	Q1	Q1	1R	Q1	A	A	A	0 / 1	0–1	0%
Wimbledon	Q1	A	Q3	1R	3R	Q1	1R	Q1	A	0 / 3	2–3	40%
US Open	A	A	Q1	Q3	1R	Q2	Q2	A	A	0 / 1	0–1	0%
Win–loss	0–0	0–0	0–0	0–1	2–3	1–1	0–1	0–0	0–0	0 / 6	3–6	33%

=== Doubles ===
Current through the 2021 French Open.

Tournament	1994	1995	1996	1997	1998	1999	2000	2001	2002	2003	2004	2005	2006	2007	2008	2009	2010	2011	2012	2013	2014	2015	2016	2017	2018	2019	2020	2021	SR	W–L
Grand Slam tournaments
Australian Open	A	A	A	A	A	A	A	A	1R	1R	2R	1R	3R	3R	1R	1R	1R	A	2R	1R	1R	2R	1R	A	A	A	A	1R	0 / 15	7–15
French Open	A	A	A	A	A	A	A	3R	1R	2R	2R	QF	3R	3R	3R	2R	SF	A	1R	1R	1R	2R	2R	2R	A	A	A	1R	0 / 17	20–16
Wimbledon	A	A	A	A	A	A	A	1R	2R	1R	F	3R	A	1R	1R	1R	3R	3R	QF	QF	QF	2R	1R	2R	A	A	NH	A	0 / 16	23–16
US Open	A	A	A	A	A	A	A	1R	1R	2R	2R	2R	2R	W	2R	3R	1R	2R	QF	1R	1R	1R	1R	1R	A	A	A	A	1 / 17	16–16
Win–loss	0–0	0–0	0–0	0–0	0–0	0–0	0–0	2–3	1–4	2–4	8–4	5–4	5–2	9–4	3–4	3–4	6–4	3–2	7–4	3–4	3–4	3–4	1–4	2–3	0–0	0–0	0–0	0–2	1 / 65	66–63
Year-end championship
ATP Finals	Did not qualify													F	Did not qualify														0 / 1	3–2
ATP Tour Masters
Indian Wells Masters	A	A	A	A	A	A	A	A	A	A	1R	1R	QF	SF	1R	1R	1R	1R	A	A	A	A	A	A	A	A	NH	A	0 / 8	5–8
Miami Open	A	A	A	A	A	A	A	A	3R	A	1R	1R	1R	2R	QF	SF	1R	1R	A	1R	1R	A	A	A	A	A	NH	A	0 / 11	8–11
Monte Carlo Masters	A	A	A	A	A	A	A	A	A	A	A	1R	2R	SF	QF	QF	1R	A	A	1R	1R	A	A	A	A	A	NH	A	0 / 8	4–8
Italian Open	A	A	A	A	A	A	A	A	A	A	A	1R	2R	1R	2R	2R	1R	A	A	1R	A	A	A	A	A	A	A	A	0 / 7	2–7
German Open	A	A	A	A	A	A	A	A	A	A	2R	2R	2R	SF	QF	Not Masters Series													0 / 5	6–5
Madrid Open	Not Held								A	A	1R	A	A	QF	QF	1R	QF	A	A	2R	A	A	A	A	A	A	NH	A	0 / 6	5–6
Canadian Open	A	A	A	A	A	A	A	A	A	A	2R	A	1R	2R	2R	A	2R	A	A	A	A	A	A	A	A	A	NH	A	0 / 5	1–5
Cincinnati Masters	A	A	A	A	A	A	A	A	A	A	1R	A	1R	QF	A	A	QF	A	A	A	A	A	A	A	A	A	A	A	0 / 4	2–4
Shanghai Masters	Not Held															SF	1R	A	A	A	A	A	A	A	A	A	NH		0 / 2	3–2
Paris Masters	A	A	A	A	A	A	A	A	A	A	A	A	1R	SF	QF	2R	A	A	1R	A	A	A	A	A	A	A	A	A	0 / 5	3–5
Win–loss	0–0	0–0	0–0	0–0	0–0	0–0	0–0	0–0	2–1	0–0	2–6	1–5	4–8	12–9	6–8	8–7	3–8	0–2	0–1	1–4	0–2	0–0	0–0	0–0	0–0	0–0	0–0	0–0	0 / 61	39–61
National representation
Olympics	Not Held		A	Not Held			A	Not Held			A	Not Held			2R	Not Held			A	Not Held			A	Not Held				A	0 / 1	1–1
Davis Cup	A	A	A	A	A	PO	1R	Z1	Z1	PO	1R	1R	1R	1R	1R	1R	Z1	A	A	1R	A	A	A	Z1	A	A	NH	A	0 / 10	11–13
Career statistics
	1994	1995	1996	1997	1998	1999	2000	2001	2002	2003	2004	2005	2006	2007	2008	2009	2010	2011	2012	2013	2014	2015	2016	2017	2018	2019	2020	2021	Career	
Titles	0	0	0	0	0	0	0	0	2	2	0	2	1	4	0	2	0	0	1	2	2	0	0	1	0	0	0	0	19	
Finals	0	0	0	0	0	0	0	0	3	4	2	2	5	6	1	4	1	1	3	5	3	2	1	1	0	0	0	0	44	
Overall win–loss	1–1	0–1	0–0	0–0	0–0	0–1	0–2	5–10	20–16	25–14	19–22	25–26	37–27	47–27	26–28	36–27	27–28	11–17	27–23	34–27	27–22	22–22	10–18	11–9	0–0	0–0	0–1	0–2	410–371	
Year-end ranking	463	488	–	384	365	184	162	84	58	38	28	32	23	7	24	21	32	81	37	34	40	51	87	74	–	–	–	–	52%	

== ATP career finals ==
=== Doubles: 44 (19 titles, 25 runner-ups) ===
Legend Grand Slam tournaments (1–1) Tennis Masters Cup / ATP World Tour Finals (0–1) ATP Masters Series / ATP World Tour Masters 1000 (0–0) ATP International Series Gold / ATP World Tour 500 Series (1–3) ATP International Series / ATP World Tour 250 Series (16–20)	Finals by surface Hard (7–16) Clay (8–6) Grass (2–2) Carpet (2–1)	Finals by setting Outdoor (15–12) Indoor (4–13)

Result	W–L	Date	Tournament	Tier	Surface	Partner	Opponents	Score
Win	1–0	Feb 2002	Copenhagen Open, Denmark	International	Hard (i)	(Germany) Michael Kohlmann	(Czech Republic) Jiří Novák (Czech Republic) Radek Štěpánek	7–6^{(10–8)}, 7–5
Loss	1–1	May 2002	Majorca Open, Spain	International	Clay	(Germany) Michael Kohlmann	(India) Mahesh Bhupathi (India) Leander Paes	2–6, 4–6
Win	2–1	Jul 2002	Croatia Open, Croatia	International	Clay	(Czech Republic) František Čermák	(Spain) Albert Portas (Spain) Fernando Vicente	6–4, 6–4
Win	3–1	Jan 2003	Chennai Open, India	International	Hard	(Germany) Michael Kohlmann	(Czech Republic) František Čermák (Czech Republic) Leoš Friedl	7–6^{(7–1)}, 7–6^{(7–3)}
Loss	3–2	Mar 2003	Copenhagen Open, Denmark	International	Hard (i)	(Germany) Michael Kohlmann	(Czech Republic) Tomáš Cibulec (Czech Republic) Pavel Vízner	5–7, 7–5, 2–6
Loss	3–3	Jul 2003	Hall of Fame Championships, US	International	Grass	(Austria) Jürgen Melzer	(Australia) Jordan Kerr (Australia) David Macpherson	6–7^{(4–7)}, 3–6
Win	4–3	Oct 2003	St. Petersburg Open, Russia	International	Carpet (i)	(Serbia and Montenegro) Nenad Zimonjić	(Germany) Michael Kohlmann (Germany) Rainer Schüttler	7–6^{(7–1)}, 6–3
Loss	4–4	May 2004	Bavarian Championships, Germany	International	Clay	(Serbia and Montenegro) Nenad Zimonjić	(United States) James Blake (The Bahamas) Mark Merklein	2–6, 4–6
Loss	4–5	Jul 2004	Wimbledon, United Kingdom	Grand Slam	Grass	(Serbia and Montenegro) Nenad Zimonjić	(Sweden) Jonas Björkman (Australia) Todd Woodbridge	1–6, 4–6, 6–4, 4–6
Win	5–5	May 2005	Bavarian Championships, Germany	International	Clay	(Croatia) Mario Ančić	(Germany) Florian Mayer (Germany) Alexander Waske	6–3, 1–6, 6–3
Win	6–5	Oct 2005	St. Petersburg Open, Russia (2)	International	Carpet (i)	(Austria) Jürgen Melzer	(Sweden) Jonas Björkman (Belarus) Max Mirnyi	4–6, 7–5, 7–5
Loss	6–6	Apr 2006	US Clay Court Championships, US	International	Clay	(Austria) Jürgen Melzer	(Germany) Michael Kohlmann (Germany) Alexander Waske	7–5, 4–6, [5–10]
Win	7–6	May 2006	Grand Prix Hassan II, Morocco	International	Clay	(Austria) Jürgen Melzer	(Germany) Michael Kohlmann (Germany) Alexander Waske	6–3, 6–4
Loss	7–7	Oct 2006	Open de Moselle, France	International	Hard (i)	(Austria) Jürgen Melzer	(France) Richard Gasquet (France) Fabrice Santoro	6–3, 1–6, [9–11]
Loss	7–8	Oct 2006	Vienna Open, Austria	International	Hard (i)	(Austria) Jürgen Melzer	(Czech Republic) Petr Pála (Czech Republic) Pavel Vízner	4–6, 6–3, [10–12]
Loss	7–9	Oct 2006	St. Petersburg Open, Russia	International	Carpet (i)	(Austria) Jürgen Melzer	(Sweden) Simon Aspelin (Australia) Todd Perry	1–6, 6–7^{(3–7)}
Loss	7–10	Feb 2007	US Indoor Tennis Championships, US	Intl. Gold	Hard (i)	(Austria) Jürgen Melzer	(United States) Eric Butorac (United Kingdom) Jamie Murray	5–7, 3–6
Win	8–10	May 2007	ATP Pörtschach, Austria	International	Clay	(Sweden) Simon Aspelin	(Czech Republic) Leoš Friedl (Czech Republic) David Škoch	7–6^{(8–6)}, 5–7, [10–5]
Win	9–10	Jun 2007	Halle Open, Germany	International	Grass	(Sweden) Simon Aspelin	(France) Fabrice Santoro (Serbia) Nenad Zimonjić	6–4, 7–6^{(7–5)}
Win	10–10	Jul 2007	Swedish Open, Sweden	International	Clay	(Sweden) Simon Aspelin	(Argentina) Martín García (Argentina) Sebastián Prieto	6–2, 6–4
Win	11–10	Sep 2007	US Open, US	Grand Slam	Hard	(Sweden) Simon Aspelin	(Czech Republic) Lukáš Dlouhý (Czech Republic) Pavel Vízner	7–5, 6–4
Loss	11–11	Nov 2007	Tennis Masters Cup, China	Masters Cup	Hard (i)	(Sweden) Simon Aspelin	(The Bahamas) Mark Knowles (Canada) Daniel Nestor	2–6, 3–6
Loss	11–12	May 2008	ATP Pörtschach, Austria	International	Clay	(Austria) Jürgen Melzer	(Brazil) Marcelo Melo (Brazil) André Sá	5–7, 7–6^{(7–3)}, [11–13]
Loss	11–13	Feb 2009	Open 13, France	250 Series	Hard (i)	(Israel) Andy Ram	(France) Arnaud Clément (France) Michaël Llodra	6–3, 3–6, [8–10]
Win	12–13	Aug 2009	Connecticut Open, US	250 Series	Hard	(Austria) Jürgen Melzer	(Brazil) Bruno Soares (Zimbabwe) Kevin Ullyett	6–4, 7–6^{(7–3)}
Win	13–13	Oct 2009	Japan Open, Japan	500 Series	Hard	(Austria) Jürgen Melzer	(United Kingdom) Ross Hutchins (Australia) Jordan Kerr	6–2, 5–7, [10–8]
Loss	13–14	Nov 2009	Vienna Open, Austria	250 Series	Hard (i)	(Austria) Jürgen Melzer	(Poland) Łukasz Kubot (Austria) Oliver Marach	6–2, 4–6, [9–11]
Loss	13–15	Feb 2010	Open 13, France	250 Series	Hard (i)	(Sweden) Robert Lindstedt	(France) Julien Benneteau (France) Michaël Llodra	4–6, 3–6
Loss	13–16	Sep 2011	Romanian Open, Romania	250 Series	Clay	(Spain) David Marrero	(Italy) Daniele Bracciali (Italy) Potito Starace	6–3, 4–6, [8–10]
Loss	13–17	May 2012	Estoril Open, Portugal	250 Series	Clay	(Spain) David Marrero	(Pakistan) Aisam-ul-Haq Qureshi (Netherlands) Jean-Julien Rojer	5–7, 5–7
Win	14–17	Jul 2012	Austrian Open, Austria	250 Series	Clay	(Czech Republic) František Čermák	(Germany) Dustin Brown (Australia) Paul Hanley	7–6^{(7–4)}, 3–6, [12–10]
Loss	14–18	Oct 2012	Vienna Open, Austria	250 Series	Hard (i)	(Slovakia) Filip Polášek	(Germany) Andre Begemann (Germany) Martin Emmrich	4–6, 6–3, [4–10]
Loss	14–19	Jan 2013	Qatar Open, Qatar	250 Series	Hard	(Slovakia) Filip Polášek	(Germany) Christopher Kas (Germany) Philipp Kohlschreiber	5–7, 4–6
Win	15–19	Feb 2013	Zagreb Indoors, Croatia	250 Series	Hard (i)	(Slovakia) Filip Polášek	(Croatia) Ivan Dodig (Croatia) Mate Pavić	3–6, 3–6
Win	16–19	Apr 2013	Grand Prix Hassan II, Morocco (2)	250 Series	Clay	(Slovakia) Filip Polášek	(Germany) Dustin Brown (Germany) Christopher Kas	6–3, 6–2
Loss	16–20	Oct 2013	Vienna Open, Austria	250 Series	Hard (i)	(Canada) Daniel Nestor	(Romania) Florin Mergea (Czech Republic) Lukáš Rosol	5–7, 4–6
Loss	16–21	Oct 2013	Swiss Indoors, Switzerland	500 Series	Hard (i)	(Austria) Oliver Marach	(Philippines) Treat Huey (United Kingdom) Dominic Inglot	3–6, 6–3, [4–10]
Win	17–21	Jan 2014	Auckland Open, New Zealand	250 Series	Hard	(Brazil) Marcelo Melo	(Austria) Alexander Peya (Brazil) Bruno Soares	4–6, 6–3, [10–5]
Win	18–21	Jun 2014	Halle Open, Germany (2)	250 Series	Grass	(Germany) Andre Begemann	(Switzerland) Marco Chiudinelli (Switzerland) Roger Federer	1–6, 7–5, [12–10]
Loss	18–22	Oct 2014	Vienna Open, Austria	250 Series	Hard (i)	(Germany) Andre Begemann	(Austria) Jürgen Melzer (Germany) Philipp Petzschner	6–7^{(6–8)}, 6–4, [7–10]
Loss	18–23	Jan 2015	Qatar Open, Qatar	250 Series	Hard	(Austria) Philipp Oswald	(Argentina) Juan Mónaco (Spain) Rafael Nadal	3–6, 4–6
Loss	18–24	Sep 2015	St. Petersburg Open, Russia	250 Series	Hard (i)	(Austria) Alexander Peya	(Philippines) Treat Huey (Finland) Henri Kontinen	5–7, 3–6
Loss	18–25	Oct 2016	Kremlin Cup, Russia	250 Series	Hard (i)	(Austria) Jürgen Melzer	(Colombia) Juan Sebastián Cabal (Colombia) Robert Farah	5–7, 6–4, [5–10]
Win	19–25	Jul 2017	Swedish Open, Sweden (2)	250 Series	Clay	(Germany) Philipp Petzschner	(Netherlands) Sander Arends (Netherlands) Matwé Middelkoop	6–2, 3–6, [10–7]
