= 2007 ATP Tour =

Men's tennis circuit

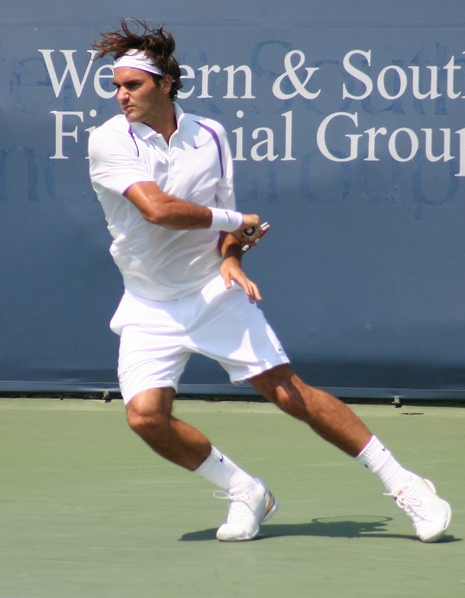
- Roger Federer finished the year ranked world No. 1 for the fourth time in his career. He won eight tournaments during the season, including three majors at the Australian Open, the Wimbledon Championships, and the US Open, as well as the Tennis Masters Cup. He also won two Masters Series events, and finished runner-up at the fourth major, the French Open.

Details
- Duration: 30 December 2006 – 11 November 2007
- Tournaments: 65
- Categories: Grand Slam (4); ATP Masters Series (9); ATP International Series Gold (9); ATP International Series (43)

Achievements (singles)
- Most titles: (Switzerland) Roger Federer (8)
- Most finals: (Switzerland) Roger Federer (12)
- Prize money leader: (Switzerland) Roger Federer ($10,130,620)
- Points leader: (Switzerland) Roger Federer (7,180)

Awards
- Player of the year: (Switzerland) Roger Federer
- Doubles team of the year: (United States) Bob Bryan (United States) Mike Bryan
- Most improved player of the year: (Serbia) Novak Djokovic
- Newcomer of the year: (France) Jo-Wilfried Tsonga
- Comeback player of the year: (Russia) Igor Andreev

The 2007 ATP Tour was the global elite men's professional tennis circuit organised by the Association of Tennis Professionals (ATP) for the 2007 tennis season. The ATP Tour is the elite tour for professional tennis organized by the Association of Tennis Professionals. The ATP Tour includes the four Grand Slam tournaments, the Tennis Masters Cup, the ATP Masters Series, the International Series Gold and the International Series tournaments.

== Round-robin trial ==
In August 2006, the ATP announced that it would conduct a trial of the round-robin tournament format during the 2007 season. ATP Executive Chairman Etienne De Villiers claimed their research showed a preference for this tournament setup among fans, tournaments and media. In a round-robin tournament each player competes once against every other player in his group. The only men's tournament using this format was the season-ending event but all regular tournaments, including the Grand Slams, used the traditional elimination or knock-out system. The round-robin format would be tested at 13 events during the 2007 ATP Tour but the Masters Series events and the Grand Slam tournaments were excluded from the experiment. The Adelaide International was scheduled as the pilot. Initial reactions from players were mixed, with Rafael Nadal in favor of the scheme and Roger Federer opposed. In early March 2007 at the Las Vegas Channel Open there was controversy when the ATP decided that James Blake had qualified for the quarterfinals only to revert that decision hours later. Player reactions became increasingly negative, claiming the format was confusing and could enable match-fixing. On 21 March 2007, the ATP announced that it had abandoned the experiment and had decided that the remaining scheduled round-robin tournaments would revert to the single-elimination form.

== Schedule ==
The table below shows the 2007 ATP Tour schedule

Key

Grand Slam tournaments
Tennis Masters Cup
ATP Masters Series
ATP International Series Gold
ATP International Series
Team events

=== January ===
Week	Tournament	Champions	Runners-up	Semifinalists	Quarterfinalists
1 Jan	Hopman Cup; Perth, Australia; Hopman Cup; Hard (i) – A$1,000,000 – 8 teams (RR)	Russia; 2–0	Spain	Round Robin losers (Group A) France; Australia; United States	Round Robin losers (Group B) India; Czech Republic; Croatia
1 Jan	Qatar Open; Doha, Qatar; International Series $1,000,000 – hard – 32S/16D; Singles – Doubles	(Croatia) Ivan Ljubičić; 6–4, 6–4	(United Kingdom) Andy Murray	(Russia) Nikolay Davydenko (Sweden) Robin Söderling	(Belgium) Olivier Rochus (Belarus) Max Mirnyi (Cyprus) Marcos Baghdatis (Russia) Mikhail Youzhny
1 Jan	Qatar Open; Doha, Qatar; International Series $1,000,000 – hard – 32S/16D; Singles – Doubles	(Russia) Mikhail Youzhny (Serbia) Nenad Zimonjić; 6–1, 7–6^{(7–3)}	(Czech Republic) Martin Damm (India) Leander Paes	(Russia) Nikolay Davydenko (Sweden) Robin Söderling	(Belgium) Olivier Rochus (Belarus) Max Mirnyi (Cyprus) Marcos Baghdatis (Russia) Mikhail Youzhny
1 Jan	Adelaide International; Adelaide, Australia; International Series; Hard – $436,000 – 24S (RR)/16D; Singles – Doubles	(Serbia) Novak Djokovic; 6–3, 6–7^{(6–8)}, 6–4	(Australia) Chris Guccione	(Sweden) Joachim Johansson (Argentina) Juan Martín del Potro	(United States) Paul Goldstein (United States) Vincent Spadea (Russia) Igor Kunitsyn (France) Richard Gasquet
1 Jan	Adelaide International; Adelaide, Australia; International Series; Hard – $436,000 – 24S (RR)/16D; Singles – Doubles	(South Africa) Wesley Moodie (Australia) Todd Perry; 6–4, 3–6, [15–13]	(Serbia) Novak Djokovic (Czech Republic) Radek Štěpánek	(Sweden) Joachim Johansson (Argentina) Juan Martín del Potro	(United States) Paul Goldstein (United States) Vincent Spadea (Russia) Igor Kunitsyn (France) Richard Gasquet
1 Jan	Chennai Open; Chennai, India; International Series; Hard – $416,000 – 32S/16D; Singles – Doubles	(Belgium) Xavier Malisse; 6–1, 6–3	(Austria) Stefan Koubek	(Spain) Rafael Nadal (Spain) Carlos Moyà	(Italy) Davide Sanguinetti (France) Fabrice Santoro (France) Julien Benneteau (Croatia) Ivo Karlović
1 Jan	Chennai Open; Chennai, India; International Series; Hard – $416,000 – 32S/16D; Singles – Doubles	(Belgium) Xavier Malisse (Belgium) Dick Norman; 7–6^{(7–4)}, 7–6^{(7–4)}	(Spain) Rafael Nadal (Spain) Bartolomé Salvá-Vidal	(Spain) Rafael Nadal (Spain) Carlos Moyà	(Italy) Davide Sanguinetti (France) Fabrice Santoro (France) Julien Benneteau (Croatia) Ivo Karlović
8 Jan	Medibank International; Sydney, Australia; International Series; Hard – $436,000 – 32S/16D; Singles – Doubles	(United States) James Blake; 6–3, 5–7, 6–1	(Spain) Carlos Moyà	(Austria) Jürgen Melzer (France) Richard Gasquet	(Czech Republic) Tomáš Berdych (Russia) Evgeny Korolev (Cyprus) Marcos Baghdatis (France) Paul-Henri Mathieu
8 Jan	Medibank International; Sydney, Australia; International Series; Hard – $436,000 – 32S/16D; Singles – Doubles	(Australia) Paul Hanley (Zimbabwe) Kevin Ullyett; 6–4, 6–7^{(3–7)}, [10–6]	(The Bahamas) Mark Knowles (Canada) Daniel Nestor	(Austria) Jürgen Melzer (France) Richard Gasquet	(Czech Republic) Tomáš Berdych (Russia) Evgeny Korolev (Cyprus) Marcos Baghdatis (France) Paul-Henri Mathieu
8 Jan	Heineken Open; Auckland, New Zealand; International Series; Hard – $416,000 – 32S/16D; Singles – Doubles	(Spain) David Ferrer; 6–4, 6–2	(Spain) Tommy Robredo	(Argentina) Agustín Calleri (United States) Mardy Fish	(Germany) Philipp Kohlschreiber (Argentina) Juan Mónaco (Belgium) Kristof Vliegen (Argentina) Juan Ignacio Chela
8 Jan	Heineken Open; Auckland, New Zealand; International Series; Hard – $416,000 – 32S/16D; Singles – Doubles	(South Africa) Jeff Coetzee (Netherlands) Rogier Wassen; 6–7^{(9–11)}, 6–3, [10–2]	(Sweden) Simon Aspelin (South Africa) Chris Haggard	(Argentina) Agustín Calleri (United States) Mardy Fish	(Germany) Philipp Kohlschreiber (Argentina) Juan Mónaco (Belgium) Kristof Vliegen (Argentina) Juan Ignacio Chela
15 Jan; 22 Jan	Australian Open; Melbourne, Australia; Grand Slam; Hard – $7,297,500 – 128S/64D/32XD; Singles – Doubles – Mixed doubles	(Switzerland) Roger Federer; 7–6^{(7–2)}, 6–4, 6–4	(Chile) Fernando González	(United States) Andy Roddick (Germany) Tommy Haas	(Spain) Tommy Robredo (United States) Mardy Fish (Russia) Nikolay Davydenko (Spain) Rafael Nadal
15 Jan; 22 Jan	Australian Open; Melbourne, Australia; Grand Slam; Hard – $7,297,500 – 128S/64D/32XD; Singles – Doubles – Mixed doubles	(United States) Bob Bryan (United States) Mike Bryan; 7–5, 7–5	(Sweden) Jonas Björkman (Belarus) Max Mirnyi	(United States) Andy Roddick (Germany) Tommy Haas	(Spain) Tommy Robredo (United States) Mardy Fish (Russia) Nikolay Davydenko (Spain) Rafael Nadal
15 Jan; 22 Jan	Australian Open; Melbourne, Australia; Grand Slam; Hard – $7,297,500 – 128S/64D/32XD; Singles – Doubles – Mixed doubles	(Canada) Daniel Nestor (Russia) Elena Likhovtseva; 6–4, 6–4	(Belarus) Max Mirnyi (Belarus) Victoria Azarenka	(United States) Andy Roddick (Germany) Tommy Haas	(Spain) Tommy Robredo (United States) Mardy Fish (Russia) Nikolay Davydenko (Spain) Rafael Nadal
29 Jan	Movistar Open; Viña del Mar, Chile; International Series; Clay – $448,000 – 24S (RR)/16D; Singles – Doubles	(Peru) Luis Horna; 7–5, 6–3	(Chile) Nicolás Massú	(Spain) Álbert Montañés (Argentina) Martín Vassallo Argüello	(Chile) Fernando González (Argentina) Sergio Roitman (Russia) Igor Andreev (Argentina) Carlos Berlocq
29 Jan	Movistar Open; Viña del Mar, Chile; International Series; Clay – $448,000 – 24S (RR)/16D; Singles – Doubles	(Chile) Paul Capdeville (Spain) Óscar Hernández; 4–6, 6–4, [10–6]	(Spain) Álbert Montañés (Spain) Rubén Ramírez Hidalgo	(Spain) Álbert Montañés (Argentina) Martín Vassallo Argüello	(Chile) Fernando González (Argentina) Sergio Roitman (Russia) Igor Andreev (Argentina) Carlos Berlocq
29 Jan	PBZ Zagreb Indoors; Zagreb, Croatia; International Series; Carpet (i) – $416,000 – 32S/16D; Singles – Doubles	(Cyprus) Marcos Baghdatis; 7–6^{(7–4)}, 4–6, 6–4	(Croatia) Ivan Ljubičić	(Russia) Mikhail Youzhny (Austria) Alexander Peya	(Sweden) Thomas Johansson (France) Marc Gicquel (France) Michaël Llodra (France) Arnaud Clément
29 Jan	PBZ Zagreb Indoors; Zagreb, Croatia; International Series; Carpet (i) – $416,000 – 32S/16D; Singles – Doubles	(Germany) Michael Kohlmann (Germany) Alexander Waske; 7–6^{(7–5)}, 4–6, [10–5]	(Czech Republic) František Čermák (Czech Republic) Jaroslav Levinský	(Russia) Mikhail Youzhny (Austria) Alexander Peya	(Sweden) Thomas Johansson (France) Marc Gicquel (France) Michaël Llodra (France) Arnaud Clément
29 Jan	Delray Beach International Tennis Championships; Delray Beach, United States; International Series; Hard – $416,000 – 24S (RR)/16D; Singles – Doubles	(Belgium) Xavier Malisse; 5–7, 6–4, 6–4	(United States) James Blake	(Germany) Benjamin Becker (United States) Vincent Spadea	(Germany) Florian Mayer (Italy) Davide Sanguinetti (Spain) Guillermo García-López (Germany) Tommy Haas
29 Jan	Delray Beach International Tennis Championships; Delray Beach, United States; International Series; Hard – $416,000 – 24S (RR)/16D; Singles – Doubles	(United States) Hugo Armando (Belgium) Xavier Malisse; 6–3, 6–7^{(4–7)}, [10–5]	(United Kingdom) James Auckland (Australia) Stephen Huss	(Germany) Benjamin Becker (United States) Vincent Spadea	(Germany) Florian Mayer (Italy) Davide Sanguinetti (Spain) Guillermo García-López (Germany) Tommy Haas

=== February ===
Week	Tournament	Champions	Runners-up	Semifinalists	Quarterfinalists
5 Feb	Davis Cup: First Round; La Serena, Chile – clay Clermont-Ferrand, France – hard (i); Krefeld, Germany – hard (i); Liège, Belgium – clay (i); Ostrava, Czech Republic – clay (i); Geneva, Switzerland – carpet (i); Minsk, Belarus – hard (i); Linz, Austria – carpet (i)	First Round winners Russia 3–2; France 4–1; Germany 3–2; Belgium 3–2; United States 4–1; Spain 3–2; Sweden 3–2; Argentina 4–1	First Round losers Chile; Romania; Croatia; Australia; Czech Republic; Switzerland; Belarus; Austria		
12 Feb	Open 13; Marseille, France; International Series; Hard (i) – $600,000 – 32S/16D; Singles – Doubles	(France) Gilles Simon; 6–4, 7–6^{(7–3)}	(Cyprus) Marcos Baghdatis	(Sweden) Robin Söderling (Finland) Jarkko Nieminen	(France) Richard Gasquet (Sweden) Jonas Björkman (Russia) Mikhail Youzhny (France) Julien Benneteau
12 Feb	Open 13; Marseille, France; International Series; Hard (i) – $600,000 – 32S/16D; Singles – Doubles	(France) Arnaud Clément (France) Michaël Llodra; 7–5, 4–6, [10–8]	(The Bahamas) Mark Knowles (Canada) Daniel Nestor	(Sweden) Robin Söderling (Finland) Jarkko Nieminen	(France) Richard Gasquet (Sweden) Jonas Björkman (Russia) Mikhail Youzhny (France) Julien Benneteau
12 Feb	Brasil Open; Costa do Sauípe, Brazil; International Series; Clay – $456,000 – 32S/16D; Singles – Doubles	(Argentina) Guillermo Cañas; 7–6^{(7–4)}, 6–2	(Spain) Juan Carlos Ferrero	(Brazil) Flávio Saretta (Argentina) Juan Ignacio Chela	(Italy) Potito Starace (Spain) Nicolás Almagro (Argentina) Juan Mónaco (Argentina) Agustín Calleri
12 Feb	Brasil Open; Costa do Sauípe, Brazil; International Series; Clay – $456,000 – 32S/16D; Singles – Doubles	(Czech Republic) Lukáš Dlouhý (Czech Republic) Pavel Vízner; 6–2, 7–6^{(7–4)}	(Spain) Álbert Montañés (Spain) Rubén Ramírez Hidalgo	(Brazil) Flávio Saretta (Argentina) Juan Ignacio Chela	(Italy) Potito Starace (Spain) Nicolás Almagro (Argentina) Juan Mónaco (Argentina) Agustín Calleri
12 Feb	SAP Open; San Jose, United States; International Series; Hard (i) – $416,000 – 32S/16D; Singles – Doubles	(United Kingdom) Andy Murray; 6–7^{(3–7)}, 6–4, 7–6^{(7–2)}	(Croatia) Ivo Karlović	(United States) Andy Roddick (Germany) Benjamin Becker	(United States) Vincent Spadea (South Korea) Lee Hyung-taik (Russia) Marat Safin (United States) Mardy Fish
12 Feb	SAP Open; San Jose, United States; International Series; Hard (i) – $416,000 – 32S/16D; Singles – Doubles	(United States) Eric Butorac (United Kingdom) Jamie Murray; 7–5, 7–6^{(8–6)}	(South Africa) Chris Haggard (Germany) Rainer Schüttler	(United States) Andy Roddick (Germany) Benjamin Becker	(United States) Vincent Spadea (South Korea) Lee Hyung-taik (Russia) Marat Safin (United States) Mardy Fish
19 Feb	ABN AMRO World Tennis Tournament; Rotterdam, Netherlands; International Series Gold; Hard (i) – $925,000 – 32S/16D; Singles – Doubles	(Russia) Mikhail Youzhny; 6–2, 6–4	(Croatia) Ivan Ljubičić	(Russia) Nikolay Davydenko (Serbia) Novak Djokovic	(Germany) Philipp Kohlschreiber (Germany) Florian Mayer (Spain) David Ferrer (Spain) Tommy Robredo
19 Feb	ABN AMRO World Tennis Tournament; Rotterdam, Netherlands; International Series Gold; Hard (i) – $925,000 – 32S/16D; Singles – Doubles	(Czech Republic) Martin Damm (India) Leander Paes; 6–3, 6–7^{(5–7)}, [10–7]	(Romania) Andrei Pavel (Germany) Alexander Waske	(Russia) Nikolay Davydenko (Serbia) Novak Djokovic	(Germany) Philipp Kohlschreiber (Germany) Florian Mayer (Spain) David Ferrer (Spain) Tommy Robredo
19 Feb	Morgan Keegan Championships; Memphis, United States; International Series Gold; Hard (i) – $757,000 – 32S/16D; Singles – Doubles	(Germany) Tommy Haas; 6–3, 6–2	(United States) Andy Roddick	(United Kingdom) Andy Murray (United States) Mardy Fish	(Chinese Taipei) Lu Yen-hsun (Austria) Stefan Koubek (Russia) Teymuraz Gabashvili (United States) Sam Querrey
19 Feb	Morgan Keegan Championships; Memphis, United States; International Series Gold; Hard (i) – $757,000 – 32S/16D; Singles – Doubles	(United States) Eric Butorac (United Kingdom) Jamie Murray; 7–5, 6–3	(Austria) Julian Knowle (Austria) Jürgen Melzer	(United Kingdom) Andy Murray (United States) Mardy Fish	(Chinese Taipei) Lu Yen-hsun (Austria) Stefan Koubek (Russia) Teymuraz Gabashvili (United States) Sam Querrey
19 Feb	Copa Telmex; Buenos Aires, Argentina; International Series; Clay – $445,000 – 24S (RR)/16D; Singles – Doubles	(Argentina) Juan Mónaco; 6–1, 6–2	(Italy) Alessio di Mauro	(Spain) Nicolás Almagro (Argentina) Diego Hartfield	(Peru) Luis Horna (Argentina) Juan Ignacio Chela (Spain) Álbert Montañés (France) Nicolas Devilder
19 Feb	Copa Telmex; Buenos Aires, Argentina; International Series; Clay – $445,000 – 24S (RR)/16D; Singles – Doubles	(Argentina) Martin García (Argentina) Sebastián Prieto; 6–4, 6–2	(Spain) Álbert Montañés (Spain) Rubén Ramírez Hidalgo	(Spain) Nicolás Almagro (Argentina) Diego Hartfield	(Peru) Luis Horna (Argentina) Juan Ignacio Chela (Spain) Álbert Montañés (France) Nicolas Devilder
26 Feb	Barclays Dubai Tennis Championships; Dubai, UAE; International Series Gold; Hard – $1,426,250 – 32S/16D; Singles – Doubles	(Switzerland) Roger Federer; 6–4, 6–3	(Russia) Mikhail Youzhny	(Germany) Tommy Haas (Sweden) Robin Söderling	(Serbia) Novak Djokovic (Belgium) Olivier Rochus (France) Fabrice Santoro (Spain) Rafael Nadal
26 Feb	Barclays Dubai Tennis Championships; Dubai, UAE; International Series Gold; Hard – $1,426,250 – 32S/16D; Singles – Doubles	(France) Fabrice Santoro (Serbia) Nenad Zimonjić; 7–5, 6–7^{(3–7)}, [10–7]	(India) Mahesh Bhupathi (Czech Republic) Radek Štěpánek	(Germany) Tommy Haas (Sweden) Robin Söderling	(Serbia) Novak Djokovic (Belgium) Olivier Rochus (France) Fabrice Santoro (Spain) Rafael Nadal
26 Feb	Abierto Mexicano Telcel; Acapulco, Mexico; International Series Gold; Clay – $757,000 – 32S/16D; Singles – Doubles	(Argentina) Juan Ignacio Chela; 6–3, 7–6^{(7–2)}	(Spain) Carlos Moyà	(Spain) Juan Carlos Ferrero (Argentina) Agustín Calleri	(Argentina) Gastón Gaudio (Spain) Nicolás Almagro (Chile) Nicolas Massú (Argentina) José Acasuso
26 Feb	Abierto Mexicano Telcel; Acapulco, Mexico; International Series Gold; Clay – $757,000 – 32S/16D; Singles – Doubles	(Italy) Potito Starace (Argentina) Martín Vassallo Argüello; 6–0, 6–2	(Czech Republic) Lukáš Dlouhý (Czech Republic) Pavel Vízner	(Spain) Juan Carlos Ferrero (Argentina) Agustín Calleri	(Argentina) Gastón Gaudio (Spain) Nicolás Almagro (Chile) Nicolas Massú (Argentina) José Acasuso
26 Feb	Channel Open; Las Vegas, United States; International Series; Hard – $416,000 – 24S (RR)/16D; Singles – Doubles	(Australia) Lleyton Hewitt; 6–4, 7–6^{(12–10)}	(Austria) Jürgen Melzer	(Russia) Evgeny Korolev (Russia) Marat Safin	(United States) Sam Querrey (Czech Republic) Jan Hernych (Spain) Fernando Verdasco (Spain) Feliciano López
26 Feb	Channel Open; Las Vegas, United States; International Series; Hard – $416,000 – 24S (RR)/16D; Singles – Doubles	(United States) Bob Bryan (United States) Mike Bryan; 7–6^{(8–6)}, 6–2	(Israel) Jonathan Erlich (Israel) Andy Ram	(Russia) Evgeny Korolev (Russia) Marat Safin	(United States) Sam Querrey (Czech Republic) Jan Hernych (Spain) Fernando Verdasco (Spain) Feliciano López

=== March ===
Week	Tournament	Champions	Runners-up	Semifinalists	Quarterfinalists
5 Mar; 12 Mar	Pacific Life Open; Indian Wells, United States; Masters Series; Hard – $3,035,000 – 96S/32D; Singles – Doubles	(Spain) Rafael Nadal; 6–2, 7–5	(Serbia) Novak Djokovic	(United Kingdom) Andy Murray (United States) Andy Roddick	(Spain) David Ferrer (Germany) Tommy Haas (Croatia) Ivan Ljubičić (Argentina) Juan Ignacio Chela
5 Mar; 12 Mar	Pacific Life Open; Indian Wells, United States; Masters Series; Hard – $3,035,000 – 96S/32D; Singles – Doubles	(Czech Republic) Martin Damm (India) Leander Paes; 6–4, 6–4	(Israel) Jonathan Erlich (Israel) Andy Ram	(United Kingdom) Andy Murray (United States) Andy Roddick	(Spain) David Ferrer (Germany) Tommy Haas (Croatia) Ivan Ljubičić (Argentina) Juan Ignacio Chela
19 Mar; 26 Mar	Sony Ericsson Open; Key Biscayne, United States; Masters Series; Hard – $3,200,000 – 96S/32D; Singles – Doubles	(Serbia) Novak Djokovic; 6–3, 6–2, 6–4	(Argentina) Guillermo Cañas	(Croatia) Ivan Ljubičić (United Kingdom) Andy Murray	(Spain) Tommy Robredo (Argentina) Juan Ignacio Chela (United States) Andy Roddick (Spain) Rafael Nadal
19 Mar; 26 Mar	Sony Ericsson Open; Key Biscayne, United States; Masters Series; Hard – $3,200,000 – 96S/32D; Singles – Doubles	(United States) Bob Bryan (United States) Mike Bryan; 6–7^{(7–9)}, 6–3, [10–7]	(Czech Republic) Martin Damm (India) Leander Paes	(Croatia) Ivan Ljubičić (United Kingdom) Andy Murray	(Spain) Tommy Robredo (Argentina) Juan Ignacio Chela (United States) Andy Roddick (Spain) Rafael Nadal

=== April ===
Week	Tournament	Champions	Runners-up	Semifinalists	Quarterfinalists
2 Apr	2007 Davis Cup Quarterfinals; Moscow, Russia – clay (i); Ostend, Belgium – clay (i); Winston-Salem, North Carolina, USA – hard (i); Gothenburg, Sweden – carpet (i)	Quarterfinals winners Russia 3–2; Germany 3–2; United States 4–1; Sweden 4–1	Quarterfinals losers France; Belgium; Spain; Argentina		
9 Apr	Valencia Open; Valencia, Spain; International Series; Clay – $416,000 – 32S/16D; Singles – Doubles	(Spain) Nicolás Almagro; 4–6, 6–2, 6–1	(Italy) Potito Starace	(Spain) Iván Navarro Pastor (Spain) Santiago Ventura	(Russia) Evgeny Korolev (Spain) Marcel Granollers-Pujol (Italy) Filippo Volandri (Spain) Alberto Martín
9 Apr	Valencia Open; Valencia, Spain; International Series; Clay – $416,000 – 32S/16D; Singles – Doubles	(South Africa) Wesley Moodie (Australia) Todd Perry; 7–5, 7–5	(Switzerland) Yves Allegro (Argentina) Sebastián Prieto	(Spain) Iván Navarro Pastor (Spain) Santiago Ventura	(Russia) Evgeny Korolev (Spain) Marcel Granollers-Pujol (Italy) Filippo Volandri (Spain) Alberto Martín
9 Apr	US Men's Clay Court Championships; Houston, United States; International Series; Clay – $416,000 – 32S/16D; Singles – Doubles	(Croatia) Ivo Karlović; 6–4, 6–1	(Argentina) Mariano Zabaleta	(Spain) Álbert Montañés (United States) James Blake	(United States) Vincent Spadea (Germany) Tommy Haas (Austria) Jürgen Melzer (Argentina) Juan Mónaco
9 Apr	US Men's Clay Court Championships; Houston, United States; International Series; Clay – $416,000 – 32S/16D; Singles – Doubles	(United States) Bob Bryan (United States) Mike Bryan; 7–6^{(7–3)}, 6–4	(The Bahamas) Mark Knowles (Canada) Daniel Nestor	(Spain) Álbert Montañés (United States) James Blake	(United States) Vincent Spadea (Germany) Tommy Haas (Austria) Jürgen Melzer (Argentina) Juan Mónaco
16 Apr	Monte Carlo Masters; Roquebrune-Cap-Martin, France; Masters Series; Clay – $2,200,000 – 56S/24D; Singles – Doubles	(Spain) Rafael Nadal; 6–4, 6–4	(Switzerland) Roger Federer	(Spain) Juan Carlos Ferrero (Czech Republic) Tomáš Berdych	(Spain) David Ferrer (France) Richard Gasquet (Sweden) Robin Söderling (Germany) Philipp Kohlschreiber
16 Apr	Monte Carlo Masters; Roquebrune-Cap-Martin, France; Masters Series; Clay – $2,200,000 – 56S/24D; Singles – Doubles	(United States) Bob Bryan (United States) Mike Bryan; 6–2, 6–1	(France) Julien Benneteau (France) Richard Gasquet	(Spain) Juan Carlos Ferrero (Czech Republic) Tomáš Berdych	(Spain) David Ferrer (France) Richard Gasquet (Sweden) Robin Söderling (Germany) Philipp Kohlschreiber
23 Apr	Barcelona Open; Barcelona, Spain; International Series Gold; Clay – $1,000,000 – 56S/24D; Singles – Doubles	(Spain) Rafael Nadal; 6–3, 6–4	(Argentina) Guillermo Cañas	(Spain) David Ferrer (Argentina) Agustín Calleri	(Italy) Potito Starace (Argentina) David Nalbandian (Spain) Óscar Hernández (Russia) Nikolay Davydenko
23 Apr	Barcelona Open; Barcelona, Spain; International Series Gold; Clay – $1,000,000 – 56S/24D; Singles – Doubles	(Romania) Andrei Pavel (Germany) Alexander Waske; 6–3, 7–6^{(7–1)}	(Spain) Rafael Nadal (Spain) Bartolomé Salvá-Vidal	(Spain) David Ferrer (Argentina) Agustín Calleri	(Italy) Potito Starace (Argentina) David Nalbandian (Spain) Óscar Hernández (Russia) Nikolay Davydenko
23 Apr	Grand Prix Hassan II; Casablanca, Morocco; International Series; Clay – $416,000 – 32S/16D; Singles – Doubles	(France) Paul-Henri Mathieu; 6–1, 6–1	(Spain) Álbert Montañés	(Spain) Rubén Ramírez Hidalgo (France) Marc Gicquel	(Slovakia) Dominik Hrbatý (France) Sébastien Grosjean (France) Julien Benneteau (Argentina) José Acasuso
23 Apr	Grand Prix Hassan II; Casablanca, Morocco; International Series; Clay – $416,000 – 32S/16D; Singles – Doubles	(Australia) Jordan Kerr (Czech Republic) David Škoch; 7–6^{(7–4)}, 1–6, [10–4]	(Poland) Łukasz Kubot (Austria) Oliver Marach	(Spain) Rubén Ramírez Hidalgo (France) Marc Gicquel	(Slovakia) Dominik Hrbatý (France) Sébastien Grosjean (France) Julien Benneteau (Argentina) José Acasuso
30 Apr	Estoril Open; Oeiras, Portugal; International Series; Clay – $625,000 – 32S/16D; Singles – Doubles	(Serbia) Novak Djokovic; 7–6^{(9–7)}, 0–6, 6–1	(France) Richard Gasquet	(France) Paul-Henri Mathieu (Spain) Tommy Robredo	(United States) Vincent Spadea (Argentina) Juan Mónaco (Spain) Guillermo García-López (Argentina) Agustín Calleri
30 Apr	Estoril Open; Oeiras, Portugal; International Series; Clay – $625,000 – 32S/16D; Singles – Doubles	(Brazil) Marcelo Melo (Brazil) André Sá; 3–6, 6–2, [10–6]	(Argentina) Martín García (Argentina) Sebastián Prieto	(France) Paul-Henri Mathieu (Spain) Tommy Robredo	(United States) Vincent Spadea (Argentina) Juan Mónaco (Spain) Guillermo García-López (Argentina) Agustín Calleri
30 Apr	BMW Open; Munich, Germany; International Series; Clay – $416,000 – 32S/16D; Singles – Doubles	(Germany) Philipp Kohlschreiber; 2–6, 6–3, 6–4	(Russia) Mikhail Youzhny	(Cyprus) Marcos Baghdatis (Czech Republic) Tomáš Berdych	(France) Sébastien Grosjean (Germany) Alexander Waske (Austria) Jürgen Melzer (France) Nicolas Devilder
30 Apr	BMW Open; Munich, Germany; International Series; Clay – $416,000 – 32S/16D; Singles – Doubles	(Germany) Philipp Kohlschreiber (Russia) Mikhail Youzhny; 6–1, 6–4	(Czech Republic) Jan Hájek (Czech Republic) Jaroslav Levinský	(Cyprus) Marcos Baghdatis (Czech Republic) Tomáš Berdych	(France) Sébastien Grosjean (Germany) Alexander Waske (Austria) Jürgen Melzer (France) Nicolas Devilder

=== May ===
Week	Tournament	Champions	Runners-up	Semifinalists	Quarterfinalists
7 May	Internazionali BNL d'Italia; Rome, Italy; Masters Series; Clay – $2,200,000 – 56S/24D; Singles – Doubles	(Spain) Rafael Nadal; 6–2, 6–2	(Chile) Fernando González	(Italy) Filippo Volandri (Russia) Nikolay Davydenko	(Czech Republic) Tomáš Berdych (Argentina) Juan Ignacio Chela (Spain) Tommy Robredo (Serbia) Novak Djokovic
7 May	Internazionali BNL d'Italia; Rome, Italy; Masters Series; Clay – $2,200,000 – 56S/24D; Singles – Doubles	(France) Fabrice Santoro (Serbia) Nenad Zimonjić; 6–4, 6–7^{(4–7)}, [10–7]	(United States) Bob Bryan (United States) Mike Bryan	(Italy) Filippo Volandri (Russia) Nikolay Davydenko	(Czech Republic) Tomáš Berdych (Argentina) Juan Ignacio Chela (Spain) Tommy Robredo (Serbia) Novak Djokovic
14 May	Hamburg Masters; Hamburg, Germany; Masters Series; Clay – $2,200,000 – 56S/24D; Singles – Doubles	(Switzerland) Roger Federer; 2–6, 6–2, 6–0	(Spain) Rafael Nadal	(Spain) Carlos Moyà (Australia) Lleyton Hewitt	(Spain) David Ferrer (Serbia) Novak Djokovic (Spain) Nicolás Almagro (Chile) Fernando González
14 May	Hamburg Masters; Hamburg, Germany; Masters Series; Clay – $2,200,000 – 56S/24D; Singles – Doubles	(United States) Bob Bryan (United States) Mike Bryan; 6–3, 6–4	(Australia) Paul Hanley (Zimbabwe) Kevin Ullyett	(Spain) Carlos Moyà (Australia) Lleyton Hewitt	(Spain) David Ferrer (Serbia) Novak Djokovic (Spain) Nicolás Almagro (Chile) Fernando González
21 May	Hypo Group Tennis International; Poertschach, Austria; International Series; Clay – $416,000 – 32S/16D; Singles – Doubles	(Argentina) Juan Mónaco; 7–6^{(7–3)}, 6–0	(France) Gaël Monfils	(Peru) Luis Horna (Australia) Lleyton Hewitt	(Russia) Nikolay Davydenko (Spain) Álbert Montañés (Argentina) Diego Hartfield (United States) Andy Roddick
21 May	Hypo Group Tennis International; Poertschach, Austria; International Series; Clay – $416,000 – 32S/16D; Singles – Doubles	(Sweden) Simon Aspelin (Austria) Julian Knowle; 7–6^{(8–6)}, 5–7, [10–5]	(Czech Republic) Leoš Friedl (Czech Republic) David Škoch	(Peru) Luis Horna (Australia) Lleyton Hewitt	(Russia) Nikolay Davydenko (Spain) Álbert Montañés (Argentina) Diego Hartfield (United States) Andy Roddick
21 May	World Team Cup; Düsseldorf, Germany; World Team Cup; Clay – $1,764,700 – 8 teams (RR)	Argentina; 2–1	Czech Republic	Spain; Chile	Germany; Belgium; Sweden; United States
28 May; 4 Jun	French Open; Paris, France; Grand Slam €6,947,960 – clay – 128S/64D/32XD; Singles – Doubles – Mixed doubles	(Spain) Rafael Nadal; 6–3, 4–6, 6–3, 6–4	(Switzerland) Roger Federer	(Russia) Nikolay Davydenko (Serbia) Novak Djokovic	(Spain) Tommy Robredo (Argentina) Guillermo Cañas (Russia) Igor Andreev (Spain) Carlos Moyà
28 May; 4 Jun	French Open; Paris, France; Grand Slam €6,947,960 – clay – 128S/64D/32XD; Singles – Doubles – Mixed doubles	(The Bahamas) Mark Knowles (Canada) Daniel Nestor; 2–6, 6–3, [6–4]	(Czech Republic) Lukáš Dlouhý (Czech Republic) Pavel Vízner	(Russia) Nikolay Davydenko (Serbia) Novak Djokovic	(Spain) Tommy Robredo (Argentina) Guillermo Cañas (Russia) Igor Andreev (Spain) Carlos Moyà
28 May; 4 Jun	French Open; Paris, France; Grand Slam €6,947,960 – clay – 128S/64D/32XD; Singles – Doubles – Mixed doubles	(Israel) Andy Ram (France) Nathalie Dechy; 7–5, 6–3	(Serbia) Nenad Zimonjić (Slovenia) Katarina Srebotnik	(Russia) Nikolay Davydenko (Serbia) Novak Djokovic	(Spain) Tommy Robredo (Argentina) Guillermo Cañas (Russia) Igor Andreev (Spain) Carlos Moyà

=== June ===
Week	Tournament	Champions	Runners-up	Semifinalists	Quarterfinalists
11 Jun	Gerry Weber Open; Halle, Germany; International Series; Grass – $800,000 – 32S/16D; Singles – Doubles	(Czech Republic) Tomáš Berdych; 7–5, 6–4	(Cyprus) Marcos Baghdatis	(Finland) Jarkko Nieminen (Germany) Philipp Kohlschreiber	(France) Marc Gicquel (Russia) Mikhail Youzhny (United States) James Blake (Germany) Florian Mayer
11 Jun	Gerry Weber Open; Halle, Germany; International Series; Grass – $800,000 – 32S/16D; Singles – Doubles	(Sweden) Simon Aspelin (Austria) Julian Knowle; 6–4, 7–6^{(7–5)}	(France) Fabrice Santoro (Serbia) Nenad Zimonjić	(Finland) Jarkko Nieminen (Germany) Philipp Kohlschreiber	(France) Marc Gicquel (Russia) Mikhail Youzhny (United States) James Blake (Germany) Florian Mayer
11 Jun	Queen's Club Championships; Queen's Club, London, UK; International Series; Grass – $800,000 – 56S/24D; Singles – Doubles	(United States) Andy Roddick; 4–6, 7–6^{(9–7)}, 7–6^{(7–2)}	(France) Nicolas Mahut	(France) Arnaud Clément (Russia) Dmitry Tursunov	(Spain) Rafael Nadal (Croatia) Ivo Karlović (Chile) Fernando González (Croatia) Marin Čilić
11 Jun	Queen's Club Championships; Queen's Club, London, UK; International Series; Grass – $800,000 – 56S/24D; Singles – Doubles	(The Bahamas) Mark Knowles (Canada) Daniel Nestor; 7–6^{(7–4)}, 7–5	(United States) Bob Bryan (United States) Mike Bryan	(France) Arnaud Clément (Russia) Dmitry Tursunov	(Spain) Rafael Nadal (Croatia) Ivo Karlović (Chile) Fernando González (Croatia) Marin Čilić
18 Jun	Ordina Open 's-Hertogenbosch, Netherlands; International Series; Grass – $416,000 – 32S/16D; Singles – Doubles	(Croatia) Ivan Ljubičić; 7–6^{(7–5)}, 4–6, 7–6^{(7–4)}	(Netherlands) Peter Wessels	(France) Anthony Dupuis (France) Julien Benneteau	(Spain) Tommy Robredo (Germany) Benjamin Becker (Germany) Michael Berrer (Serbia) Janko Tipsarević
18 Jun	Ordina Open 's-Hertogenbosch, Netherlands; International Series; Grass – $416,000 – 32S/16D; Singles – Doubles	(South Africa) Jeff Coetzee (Netherlands) Rogier Wassen; 3–6, 7–6^{(7–5)}, [12–10]	(Czech Republic) Martin Damm (India) Leander Paes	(France) Anthony Dupuis (France) Julien Benneteau	(Spain) Tommy Robredo (Germany) Benjamin Becker (Germany) Michael Berrer (Serbia) Janko Tipsarević
18 Jun	Nottingham Open; Nottingham, UK; International Series; Grass – $416,000 – 32S/16D; Singles – Doubles	(Croatia) Ivo Karlović; 3–6, 6–4, 6–4	(France) Arnaud Clément	(Sweden) Jonas Björkman (Russia) Dmitry Tursunov	(France) Richard Gasquet (France) Paul-Henri Mathieu (Argentina) Juan Martín del Potro (Spain) Guillermo García López
18 Jun	Nottingham Open; Nottingham, UK; International Series; Grass – $416,000 – 32S/16D; Singles – Doubles	(United States) Eric Butorac (United Kingdom) Jamie Murray; 4–6, 6–3, [10–5]	(United Kingdom) Joshua Goodall (United Kingdom) Ross Hutchins	(Sweden) Jonas Björkman (Russia) Dmitry Tursunov	(France) Richard Gasquet (France) Paul-Henri Mathieu (Argentina) Juan Martín del Potro (Spain) Guillermo García López
25 Jun; 2 Jul	The Championships, Wimbledon; Wimbledon, London, UK; Grand Slam £5,022,560 – grass – 128S/64D/48XD; Singles – Doubles – Mixed doubles	(Switzerland) Roger Federer; 7–6^{(9–7)}, 4–6, 7–6^{(7–3)}, 2–6, 6–2	(Spain) Rafael Nadal	(France) Richard Gasquet (Serbia) Novak Djokovic	(Spain) Juan Carlos Ferrero (United States) Andy Roddick (Cyprus) Marcos Baghdatis (Czech Republic) Tomáš Berdych
25 Jun; 2 Jul	The Championships, Wimbledon; Wimbledon, London, UK; Grand Slam £5,022,560 – grass – 128S/64D/48XD; Singles – Doubles – Mixed doubles	(France) Arnaud Clément (France) Michaël Llodra; 6–7^{(5–7)}, 6–3, 6–4, 6–4	(United States) Bob Bryan (United States) Mike Bryan	(France) Richard Gasquet (Serbia) Novak Djokovic	(Spain) Juan Carlos Ferrero (United States) Andy Roddick (Cyprus) Marcos Baghdatis (Czech Republic) Tomáš Berdych
25 Jun; 2 Jul	The Championships, Wimbledon; Wimbledon, London, UK; Grand Slam £5,022,560 – grass – 128S/64D/48XD; Singles – Doubles – Mixed doubles	(United Kingdom) Jamie Murray (Serbia) Jelena Janković; 6–4, 3–6, 6–1	(Sweden) Jonas Björkman (Australia) Alicia Molik	(France) Richard Gasquet (Serbia) Novak Djokovic	(Spain) Juan Carlos Ferrero (United States) Andy Roddick (Cyprus) Marcos Baghdatis (Czech Republic) Tomáš Berdych

=== July ===
Week	Tournament	Champions	Runners-up	Semifinalists	Quarterfinalists
9 Jul	Suisse Open; Gstaad, Switzerland; International Series; Clay – $496,000 – 32S/16D; Singles – Doubles	(France) Paul-Henri Mathieu; 6–7^{(1–7)}, 6–4, 7–5	(Italy) Andreas Seppi	(Czech Republic) Radek Štěpánek (Russia) Igor Andreev	(France) Gaël Monfils (France) Marc Gicquel (France) Richard Gasquet (Argentina) Martín Vassallo Argüello
9 Jul	Suisse Open; Gstaad, Switzerland; International Series; Clay – $496,000 – 32S/16D; Singles – Doubles	(Czech Republic) František Čermák (Czech Republic) Pavel Vízner; 7–5, 5–7, [10–7]	(France) Marc Gicquel (France) Florent Serra	(Czech Republic) Radek Štěpánek (Russia) Igor Andreev	(France) Gaël Monfils (France) Marc Gicquel (France) Richard Gasquet (Argentina) Martín Vassallo Argüello
9 Jul	Hall of Fame Tennis Championships; Newport, Rhode Island, United States; International Series; Grass – $416,000 – 32S/16D; Singles – Doubles	(France) Fabrice Santoro; 6–4, 6–4	(France) Nicolas Mahut	(Belgium) Dick Norman (South Africa) Wesley Moodie	(Pakistan) Aisam-ul-Haq Qureshi (India) Prakash Amritraj (Germany) Mischa Zverev (United States) Vincent Spadea
9 Jul	Hall of Fame Tennis Championships; Newport, Rhode Island, United States; International Series; Grass – $416,000 – 32S/16D; Singles – Doubles	(Australia) Jordan Kerr (United States) Jim Thomas; 6–3, 7–5	(Australia) Nathan Healey (Russia) Igor Kunitsyn	(Belgium) Dick Norman (South Africa) Wesley Moodie	(Pakistan) Aisam-ul-Haq Qureshi (India) Prakash Amritraj (Germany) Mischa Zverev (United States) Vincent Spadea
9 Jul	Swedish Open; Båstad, Sweden; International Series; Clay – $416,000 – 32S/16D; Singles – Doubles	(Spain) David Ferrer; 6–1, 6–2	(Spain) Nicolás Almagro	(Spain) Carlos Moyà (Italy) Filippo Volandri	(Peru) Luis Horna (Sweden) Robin Söderling (Belgium) Olivier Rochus (France) Gilles Simon
9 Jul	Swedish Open; Båstad, Sweden; International Series; Clay – $416,000 – 32S/16D; Singles – Doubles	(Sweden) Simon Aspelin (Austria) Julian Knowle; 6–2, 6–4	(Argentina) Martín García (Argentina) Sebastián Prieto	(Spain) Carlos Moyà (Italy) Filippo Volandri	(Peru) Luis Horna (Sweden) Robin Söderling (Belgium) Olivier Rochus (France) Gilles Simon
16 Jul	Mercedes Cup; Stuttgart, Germany; International Series Gold; Clay – $757,000 – 32S/16D; Singles – Doubles	(Spain) Rafael Nadal; 6–4, 7–5	(Switzerland) Stanislas Wawrinka	(Spain) Feliciano López (Argentina) Juan Ignacio Chela	(Argentina) Juan Mónaco (Spain) Juan Carlos Ferrero (Spain) Fernando Verdasco (Czech Republic) Jiří Vaněk
16 Jul	Mercedes Cup; Stuttgart, Germany; International Series Gold; Clay – $757,000 – 32S/16D; Singles – Doubles	(Czech Republic) František Čermák (Czech Republic) Leoš Friedl; 6–4, 6–4	(Spain) Guillermo García López (Spain) Fernando Verdasco	(Spain) Feliciano López (Argentina) Juan Ignacio Chela	(Argentina) Juan Mónaco (Spain) Juan Carlos Ferrero (Spain) Fernando Verdasco (Czech Republic) Jiří Vaněk
16 Jul	Countrywide Classic; Los Angeles, United States; International Series; Hard – $525,000 – 32S/16D; Singles – Doubles	(Czech Republic) Radek Štěpánek; 7–6^{(9–7)}, 5–7, 6–2	(United States) James Blake	(Germany) Nicolas Kiefer (South Korea) Lee Hyung-taik	(United States) Zack Fleishman (Germany) Michael Berrer (Russia) Marat Safin (United States) Vincent Spadea
16 Jul	Countrywide Classic; Los Angeles, United States; International Series; Hard – $525,000 – 32S/16D; Singles – Doubles	(United States) Bob Bryan (United States) Mike Bryan; 7–6^{(7–5)}, 6–2	(United States) Scott Lipsky (United States) David Martin	(Germany) Nicolas Kiefer (South Korea) Lee Hyung-taik	(United States) Zack Fleishman (Germany) Michael Berrer (Russia) Marat Safin (United States) Vincent Spadea
16 Jul	Priority Telecom Open; Amersfoort, Netherlands; International Series; Clay – $416,000 – 32S/16D; Singles – Doubles	(Belgium) Steve Darcis; 6–1, 7–6^{(7–1)}	(Austria) Werner Eschauer	(Netherlands) Robin Haase (Russia) Mikhail Youzhny	(France) Florent Serra (Spain) Carlos Moyà (Russia) Igor Andreev (Russia) Evgeny Korolev
16 Jul	Priority Telecom Open; Amersfoort, Netherlands; International Series; Clay – $416,000 – 32S/16D; Singles – Doubles	(Argentina) Juan Pablo Brzezicki (Argentina) Juan Pablo Guzmán; 6–2, 6–0	(Netherlands) Robin Haase (Netherlands) Rogier Wassen	(Netherlands) Robin Haase (Russia) Mikhail Youzhny	(France) Florent Serra (Spain) Carlos Moyà (Russia) Igor Andreev (Russia) Evgeny Korolev
23 Jul	Austrian Open; Kitzbühel, Austria; International Series Gold; Clay – $1,068,000 – 48S/16D; Singles – Doubles	(Argentina) Juan Mónaco; 5–7, 6–3, 6–4	(Italy) Potito Starace	(Spain) Fernando Verdasco (Argentina) Agustín Calleri	(Spain) Tommy Robredo (Argentina) Sergio Roitman (Italy) Andreas Seppi (Ecuador) Nicolás Lapentti
23 Jul	Austrian Open; Kitzbühel, Austria; International Series Gold; Clay – $1,068,000 – 48S/16D; Singles – Doubles	(Peru) Luis Horna (Italy) Potito Starace; 7–6^{(7–4)}, 7–6^{(7–5)}	(Germany) Tomas Behrend (Germany) Christopher Kas	(Spain) Fernando Verdasco (Argentina) Agustín Calleri	(Spain) Tommy Robredo (Argentina) Sergio Roitman (Italy) Andreas Seppi (Ecuador) Nicolás Lapentti
23 Jul	Indianapolis Tennis Championships; Indianapolis, United States; International Series; Hard – $525,000 – 32S/16D; Singles – Doubles	(Russia) Dmitry Tursunov; 6–4, 7–5	(Canada) Frank Dancevic	(United States) Andy Roddick (United States) Sam Querrey	(South Korea) Lee Hyung-taik (Russia) Igor Kunitsyn (Japan) Kei Nishikori (United States) James Blake
23 Jul	Indianapolis Tennis Championships; Indianapolis, United States; International Series; Hard – $525,000 – 32S/16D; Singles – Doubles	(Argentina) Juan Martín del Potro (United States) Travis Parrott; 3–6, 6–2, [10–6]	(Russia) Teymuraz Gabashvili (Croatia) Ivo Karlović	(United States) Andy Roddick (United States) Sam Querrey	(South Korea) Lee Hyung-taik (Russia) Igor Kunitsyn (Japan) Kei Nishikori (United States) James Blake
23 Jul	Croatia Open; Umag, Croatia; International Series; Clay – $416,000 – 32S/16D; Singles – Doubles	(Spain) Carlos Moyà; 6–4, 6–2	(Romania) Andrei Pavel	(Serbia) Viktor Troicki (Argentina) Guillermo Cañas	(Argentina) Carlos Berlocq (Italy) Filippo Volandri (Spain) David Ferrer (France) Gilles Simon
23 Jul	Croatia Open; Umag, Croatia; International Series; Clay – $416,000 – 32S/16D; Singles – Doubles	(Czech Republic) Lukáš Dlouhý (Slovakia) Michal Mertiňák; 6–1, 6–1	(Czech Republic) Jaroslav Levinský (Czech Republic) David Škoch	(Serbia) Viktor Troicki (Argentina) Guillermo Cañas	(Argentina) Carlos Berlocq (Italy) Filippo Volandri (Spain) David Ferrer (France) Gilles Simon
30 Jul	Legg Mason Tennis Classic; Washington, D. C., United States; International Series; Hard – $600,000 – 48S/16D; Singles – Doubles	(United States) Andy Roddick; 6–4, 7–6^{(7–4)}	(United States) John Isner	(Croatia) Ivo Karlović (France) Gaël Monfils	(South Korea) Lee Hyung-taik (Chile) Paul Capdeville (Russia) Marat Safin (Germany) Tommy Haas
30 Jul	Legg Mason Tennis Classic; Washington, D. C., United States; International Series; Hard – $600,000 – 48S/16D; Singles – Doubles	(United States) Bob Bryan (United States) Mike Bryan; 7–6^{(7–5)}, 3–6, [10–7]	(Israel) Jonathan Erlich (Israel) Andy Ram	(Croatia) Ivo Karlović (France) Gaël Monfils	(South Korea) Lee Hyung-taik (Chile) Paul Capdeville (Russia) Marat Safin (Germany) Tommy Haas
30 Jul	Orange Prokom Open; Sopot, Poland; International Series; Clay – $500,000 – 32S/16D; Singles – Doubles	(Spain) Tommy Robredo; 7–5, 6–0	(Argentina) José Acasuso	(Spain) Álbert Montañés (France) Gilles Simon	(Argentina) Martín Vassallo Argüello (Germany) Florian Mayer (Russia) Igor Andreev (Austria) Stefan Koubek
30 Jul	Orange Prokom Open; Sopot, Poland; International Series; Clay – $500,000 – 32S/16D; Singles – Doubles	(Poland) Mariusz Fyrstenberg (Poland) Marcin Matkowski; 6–1, 6–1	(Argentina) Martín García (Argentina) Sebastián Prieto	(Spain) Álbert Montañés (France) Gilles Simon	(Argentina) Martín Vassallo Argüello (Germany) Florian Mayer (Russia) Igor Andreev (Austria) Stefan Koubek

=== August ===
Week	Tournament	Champions	Runners-up	Semifinalists	Quarterfinalists
6 Aug	Rogers Cup; Montreal, Canada; Masters Series; Hard – $2,200,000 – 56S/24D; Singles – Doubles	(Serbia) Novak Djokovic; 7–6^{(7–2)}, 2–6, 7–6^{(7–2)}	(Switzerland) Roger Federer	(Czech Republic) Radek Štěpánek (Spain) Rafael Nadal	(Australia) Lleyton Hewitt (Russia) Nikolay Davydenko (United States) Andy Roddick (Canada) Frank Dancevic
6 Aug	Rogers Cup; Montreal, Canada; Masters Series; Hard – $2,200,000 – 56S/24D; Singles – Doubles	(India) Mahesh Bhupati (Czech Republic) Pavel Vízner; 6–4, 6–4	(Australia) Paul Hanley (Zimbabwe) Kevin Ullyett	(Czech Republic) Radek Štěpánek (Spain) Rafael Nadal	(Australia) Lleyton Hewitt (Russia) Nikolay Davydenko (United States) Andy Roddick (Canada) Frank Dancevic
13 Aug	Cincinnati Masters; Mason, United States; Masters Series; Hard – $2,200,000 – 56S/24D; Singles – Doubles	(Switzerland) Roger Federer; 6–1, 6–4	(United States) James Blake	(Australia) Lleyton Hewitt (Russia) Nikolay Davydenko	(Spain) Nicolás Almagro (Spain) Carlos Moyà (Spain) David Ferrer (United States) Sam Querrey
13 Aug	Cincinnati Masters; Mason, United States; Masters Series; Hard – $2,200,000 – 56S/24D; Singles – Doubles	(Israel) Jonathan Erlich (Israel) Andy Ram; 4–6, 6–3, [13–11]	(United States) Bob Bryan (United States) Mike Bryan	(Australia) Lleyton Hewitt (Russia) Nikolay Davydenko	(Spain) Nicolás Almagro (Spain) Carlos Moyà (Spain) David Ferrer (United States) Sam Querrey
20 Aug	Pilot Pen Tennis; New Haven, United States; International Series; Hard – $675,000 – 48S/16D; Singles – Doubles	(United States) James Blake; 7–5, 6–4	(United States) Mardy Fish	(France) Paul-Henri Mathieu (Croatia) Ivo Karlović	(France) Gilles Simon (Spain) Fernando Verdasco (Russia) Igor Andreev (Switzerland) Stanislas Wawrinka
20 Aug	Pilot Pen Tennis; New Haven, United States; International Series; Hard – $675,000 – 48S/16D; Singles – Doubles	(India) Mahesh Bhupathi (Serbia) Nenad Zimonjić; 6–3, 6–3	(Poland) Mariusz Fyrstenberg (Poland) Marcin Matkowski	(France) Paul-Henri Mathieu (Croatia) Ivo Karlović	(France) Gilles Simon (Spain) Fernando Verdasco (Russia) Igor Andreev (Switzerland) Stanislas Wawrinka
27 Aug; 3 Sep	U.S. Open; Flushing, New York, United States; Grand Slam; Hard – $8,848,000 – 128S/64D/32XD; Singles – Doubles – Mixed doubles	(Switzerland) Roger Federer; 7–6^{(7–4)}, 7–6^{(7–2)}, 6–4	(Serbia) Novak Djokovic	(Russia) Nikolay Davydenko (Spain) David Ferrer	(United States) Andy Roddick (Germany) Tommy Haas (Spain) Carlos Moyà (Argentina) Juan Ignacio Chela
27 Aug; 3 Sep	U.S. Open; Flushing, New York, United States; Grand Slam; Hard – $8,848,000 – 128S/64D/32XD; Singles – Doubles – Mixed doubles	(Sweden) Simon Aspelin (Austria) Julian Knowle; 7–5, 6–4	(Czech Republic) Lukáš Dlouhý (Czech Republic) Pavel Vízner	(Russia) Nikolay Davydenko (Spain) David Ferrer	(United States) Andy Roddick (Germany) Tommy Haas (Spain) Carlos Moyà (Argentina) Juan Ignacio Chela
27 Aug; 3 Sep	U.S. Open; Flushing, New York, United States; Grand Slam; Hard – $8,848,000 – 128S/64D/32XD; Singles – Doubles – Mixed doubles	(Belarus) Max Mirnyi (Belarus) Victoria Azarenka; 6–4, 7–6^{(8–6)}	(India) Leander Paes (United States) Meghann Shaughnessy	(Russia) Nikolay Davydenko (Spain) David Ferrer	(United States) Andy Roddick (Germany) Tommy Haas (Spain) Carlos Moyà (Argentina) Juan Ignacio Chela

=== September ===
Week	Tournament	Champions	Runners-up	Semifinalists	Quarterfinalists
10 Sep	China Open; Beijing, China; International Series; Hard – $500,000 – 32S/16D; Singles – Doubles	(Chile) Fernando González; 6–1, 3–6, 6–1	(Spain) Tommy Robredo	(Germany) Nicolas Kiefer (Croatia) Ivan Ljubičić	(Croatia) Marin Čilić (Russia) Igor Kunitsyn (Cyprus) Marcos Baghdatis (South Korea) Lee Hyung-taik
10 Sep	China Open; Beijing, China; International Series; Hard – $500,000 – 32S/16D; Singles – Doubles	(South Africa) Rik de Voest (Australia) Ashley Fisher; 6–7^{(3–7)}, 6–0, [10–6]	(South Africa) Chris Haggard (Chinese Taipei) Lu Yen-hsun	(Germany) Nicolas Kiefer (Croatia) Ivan Ljubičić	(Croatia) Marin Čilić (Russia) Igor Kunitsyn (Cyprus) Marcos Baghdatis (South Korea) Lee Hyung-taik
10 Sep	BCR Open; Bucharest, Romania; International Series; Clay – $416,000 – 32S/16D; Singles – Doubles	(France) Gilles Simon; 4–6, 6–3, 6–2	(Romania) Victor Hănescu	(Argentina) Carlos Berlocq (France) Gaël Monfils	(Russia) Yuri Schukin (United States) Hugo Armando (Italy) Potito Starace (France) Marc Gicquel
10 Sep	BCR Open; Bucharest, Romania; International Series; Clay – $416,000 – 32S/16D; Singles – Doubles	(Austria) Oliver Marach (Slovakia) Michal Mertiňák; 7–6^{(7–2)}, 7–6^{(10–8)}	(Argentina) Martín García (Argentina) Sebastián Prieto	(Argentina) Carlos Berlocq (France) Gaël Monfils	(Russia) Yuri Schukin (United States) Hugo Armando (Italy) Potito Starace (France) Marc Gicquel
17 Sep	Davis Cup: Semifinals; Moscow, Russia – clay (i); Gothenburg, Sweden – carpet (i)	Semifinals winners Russia 3–2; United States 4–1	Semifinals losers Germany; Sweden		
24 Sep	Thailand Open; Bangkok, Thailand; International Series; Hard (i) – $550,000 – 32S/16D; Singles – Doubles	(Russia) Dmitry Tursunov; 6–2, 6–1	(Germany) Benjamin Becker	(Czech Republic) Tomáš Berdych (Spain) Fernando Verdasco	(Germany) Dominik Meffert (Croatia) Ivo Karlović (France) Nicolas Mahut (Chinese Taipei) Wang Yeu-tzuoo
24 Sep	Thailand Open; Bangkok, Thailand; International Series; Hard (i) – $550,000 – 32S/16D; Singles – Doubles	(Thailand) Sanchai Ratiwatana (Thailand) Sonchat Ratiwatana; 3–6, 7–5, [10–7]	(France) Michaël Llodra (France) Nicolas Mahut	(Czech Republic) Tomáš Berdych (Spain) Fernando Verdasco	(Germany) Dominik Meffert (Croatia) Ivo Karlović (France) Nicolas Mahut (Chinese Taipei) Wang Yeu-tzuoo
24 Sep	Kingfisher Airlines Tennis Open; Mumbai, India; International Series; Hard – $416,000 – 32S/16D; Singles – Doubles	(France) Richard Gasquet; 6–3, 6–4	(Belgium) Olivier Rochus	(France) Fabrice Santoro (Germany) Rainer Schüttler	(Austria) Stefan Koubek (Finland) Jarkko Nieminen (Germany) Nicolas Kiefer (Australia) Lleyton Hewitt
24 Sep	Kingfisher Airlines Tennis Open; Mumbai, India; International Series; Hard – $416,000 – 32S/16D; Singles – Doubles	(Sweden) Robert Lindstedt (Finland) Jarkko Nieminen; 7–6^{(7–3)}, 7–6^{(7–5)}	(India) Rohan Bopanna (Pakistan) Aisam-ul-Haq Qureshi	(France) Fabrice Santoro (Germany) Rainer Schüttler	(Austria) Stefan Koubek (Finland) Jarkko Nieminen (Germany) Nicolas Kiefer (Australia) Lleyton Hewitt

=== October ===
Week	Tournament	Champions	Runners-up	Semifinalists	Quarterfinalists
1 Oct	Open de Moselle; Metz, France; International Series; Hard (i) – $416,000 – 32S/16D; Singles – Doubles	(Spain) Tommy Robredo; 0–6, 6–2, 6–3	(United Kingdom) Andy Murray	(France) Nicolas Mahut (Argentina) Guillermo Cañas	(France) Sébastien Grosjean (Russia) Igor Andreev (France) Jo-Wilfried Tsonga (Russia) Evgeny Korolev
1 Oct	Open de Moselle; Metz, France; International Series; Hard (i) – $416,000 – 32S/16D; Singles – Doubles	(France) Arnaud Clément (France) Michaël Llodra; 6–1, 6–4	(Poland) Mariusz Fyrstenberg (Poland) Marcin Matkowski	(France) Nicolas Mahut (Argentina) Guillermo Cañas	(France) Sébastien Grosjean (Russia) Igor Andreev (France) Jo-Wilfried Tsonga (Russia) Evgeny Korolev
1 Oct	Japan Open; Tokyo, Japan; International Series Gold; Hard – $832,000 – 48S/16D; Singles – Doubles	(Spain) David Ferrer; 6–1, 6–2	(France) Richard Gasquet	(Croatia) Ivo Karlović (Czech Republic) Tomáš Berdych	(Spain) Feliciano López (Australia) Lleyton Hewitt (Israel) Dudi Sela (Spain) Fernando Verdasco
1 Oct	Japan Open; Tokyo, Japan; International Series Gold; Hard – $832,000 – 48S/16D; Singles – Doubles	(Australia) Jordan Kerr (Sweden) Robert Lindstedt; 6–4, 6–4	(Canada) Frank Dancevic (Australia) Stephen Huss	(Croatia) Ivo Karlović (Czech Republic) Tomáš Berdych	(Spain) Feliciano López (Australia) Lleyton Hewitt (Israel) Dudi Sela (Spain) Fernando Verdasco
8 Oct	BA-CA Tennis Trophy; Vienna, Austria; International Series Gold; Hard (i) – $755,000 – 32S/16D; Singles – Doubles	(Serbia) Novak Djokovic; 6–4, 6–0	(Switzerland) Stanislas Wawrinka	(Italy) Andreas Seppi (Spain) Juan Carlos Ferrero	(Argentina) Juan Ignacio Chela (Croatia) Ivan Ljubičić (Spain) Feliciano López (Chile) Fernando González
8 Oct	BA-CA Tennis Trophy; Vienna, Austria; International Series Gold; Hard (i) – $755,000 – 32S/16D; Singles – Doubles	(Poland) Mariusz Fyrstenberg (Poland) Marcin Matkowski; 6–4, 6–2	(Germany) Tomas Behrend (Germany) Christopher Kas	(Italy) Andreas Seppi (Spain) Juan Carlos Ferrero	(Argentina) Juan Ignacio Chela (Croatia) Ivan Ljubičić (Spain) Feliciano López (Chile) Fernando González
8 Oct	If Stockholm Open; Stockholm, Sweden; International Series; Hard (i) – $800,000 – 32S/16D; Singles – Doubles	(Croatia) Ivo Karlović; 6–3, 3–6, 6–1	(Sweden) Thomas Johansson	(United States) James Blake (Germany) Tommy Haas	(Finland) Jarkko Nieminen (Croatia) Mario Ančić (Argentina) Juan Mónaco (France) Arnaud Clément
8 Oct	If Stockholm Open; Stockholm, Sweden; International Series; Hard (i) – $800,000 – 32S/16D; Singles – Doubles	(Sweden) Jonas Björkman (Belarus) Max Mirnyi; 6–4, 6–4	(France) Arnaud Clément (France) Michaël Llodra	(United States) James Blake (Germany) Tommy Haas	(Finland) Jarkko Nieminen (Croatia) Mario Ančić (Argentina) Juan Mónaco (France) Arnaud Clément
8 Oct	Kremlin Cup; Moscow, Russia; International Series; Hard (i) – $1,000,000 – 32S/16D; Singles – Doubles	(Russia) Nikolay Davydenko; 7–5, 7–6^{(11–9)}	(France) Paul-Henri Mathieu	(Serbia) Janko Tipsarević (Germany) Michael Berrer	(Russia) Igor Andreev (Czech Republic) Radek Štěpánek (France) Florent Serra (Germany) Philipp Kohlschreiber
8 Oct	Kremlin Cup; Moscow, Russia; International Series; Hard (i) – $1,000,000 – 32S/16D; Singles – Doubles	(Russia) Marat Safin (Russia) Dmitry Tursunov; 6–4, 6–2	(Czech Republic) Tomáš Cibulec (Croatia) Lovro Zovko	(Serbia) Janko Tipsarević (Germany) Michael Berrer	(Russia) Igor Andreev (Czech Republic) Radek Štěpánek (France) Florent Serra (Germany) Philipp Kohlschreiber
15 Oct	Mutua Madrileña Madrid Open; Madrid, Spain; Masters Series; Hard (i) – $2,200,000 – 48S/24D; Singles – Doubles	(Argentina) David Nalbandian; 1–6, 6–3, 6–3	(Switzerland) Roger Federer	(Germany) Nicolas Kiefer (Serbia) Novak Djokovic	(Spain) Feliciano López (Chile) Fernando González (Croatia) Mario Ančić (Spain) Rafael Nadal
15 Oct	Mutua Madrileña Madrid Open; Madrid, Spain; Masters Series; Hard (i) – $2,200,000 – 48S/24D; Singles – Doubles	(United States) Bob Bryan (United States) Mike Bryan; 6–3, 7–6^{(7–4)}	(Poland) Mariusz Fyrstenberg (Poland) Marcin Matkowski	(Germany) Nicolas Kiefer (Serbia) Novak Djokovic	(Spain) Feliciano López (Chile) Fernando González (Croatia) Mario Ančić (Spain) Rafael Nadal
22 Oct	St Petersburg Open; Saint Petersburg, Russia; International Series; Carpet (i) – $1,000,000 – 32S/16D; Singles – Doubles	(United Kingdom) Andy Murray; 6–2, 6–3	(Spain) Fernando Verdasco	(Croatia) Marin Čilić (Russia) Mikhail Youzhny	(Latvia) Ernests Gulbis (Italy) Potito Starace (Germany) Philipp Kohlschreiber (Russia) Dmitry Tursunov
22 Oct	St Petersburg Open; Saint Petersburg, Russia; International Series; Carpet (i) – $1,000,000 – 32S/16D; Singles – Doubles	(Canada) Daniel Nestor (Serbia) Nenad Zimonjić; 6–1, 7–6^{(7–3)}	(Austria) Jürgen Melzer (Australia) Todd Perry	(Croatia) Marin Čilić (Russia) Mikhail Youzhny	(Latvia) Ernests Gulbis (Italy) Potito Starace (Germany) Philipp Kohlschreiber (Russia) Dmitry Tursunov
22 Oct	Grand Prix de Tennis de Lyon; Lyon, France; International Series; Carpet (i) – $800,000 – 32S/16D; Singles – Doubles	(France) Sébastien Grosjean; 7–6^{(7–5)}, 6–4	(France) Marc Gicquel	(France) Jo-Wilfried Tsonga (Colombia) Alejandro Falla	(France) Julien Benneteau (Belgium) Olivier Rochus (Croatia) Ivan Ljubičić (Argentina) Diego Hartfield
22 Oct	Grand Prix de Tennis de Lyon; Lyon, France; International Series; Carpet (i) – $800,000 – 32S/16D; Singles – Doubles	(France) Sébastien Grosjean (France) Jo-Wilfried Tsonga; 6–4, 6–3	(Poland) Łukasz Kubot (Croatia) Lovro Zovko	(France) Jo-Wilfried Tsonga (Colombia) Alejandro Falla	(France) Julien Benneteau (Belgium) Olivier Rochus (Croatia) Ivan Ljubičić (Argentina) Diego Hartfield
22 Oct	Davidoff Swiss Indoors; Basel, Switzerland; International Series; Hard (i) – $1,000,000 – 32S/16D; Singles – Doubles	(Switzerland) Roger Federer; 6–3, 6–4	(Finland) Jarkko Nieminen	(Croatia) Ivo Karlović (Cyprus) Marcos Baghdatis	(Germany) Nicolas Kiefer (Czech Republic) Tomáš Berdych (France) Paul-Henri Mathieu (Chile) Fernando González
22 Oct	Davidoff Swiss Indoors; Basel, Switzerland; International Series; Hard (i) – $1,000,000 – 32S/16D; Singles – Doubles	(United States) Bob Bryan (United States) Mike Bryan; 6–1, 6–1	(United States) James Blake (The Bahamas) Mark Knowles	(Croatia) Ivo Karlović (Cyprus) Marcos Baghdatis	(Germany) Nicolas Kiefer (Czech Republic) Tomáš Berdych (France) Paul-Henri Mathieu (Chile) Fernando González
29 Oct	BNP Paribas Masters; Paris, France; Masters Series; Hard (i) – $2,200,000 – 48S/24D; Singles – Doubles	(Argentina) David Nalbandian; 6–4, 6–0	(Spain) Rafael Nadal	(France) Richard Gasquet (Cyprus) Marcos Baghdatis	(Spain) David Ferrer (United Kingdom) Andy Murray (Spain) Tommy Robredo (Russia) Mikhail Youzhny
29 Oct	BNP Paribas Masters; Paris, France; Masters Series; Hard (i) – $2,200,000 – 48S/24D; Singles – Doubles	(United States) Bob Bryan (United States) Mike Bryan; 6–3, 7–6^{(7–4)}	(Canada) Daniel Nestor (Serbia) Nenad Zimonjić	(France) Richard Gasquet (Cyprus) Marcos Baghdatis	(Spain) David Ferrer (United Kingdom) Andy Murray (Spain) Tommy Robredo (Russia) Mikhail Youzhny

=== November ===
Week	Tournament	Champions	Runners-up	Semifinalists	Quarterfinalists
12 Nov	Tennis Masters Cup; Shanghai, China; Tennis Masters Cup; Hard (i) – $4,450,000 – 8S/8D (RR); Singles – Doubles	(Switzerland) Roger Federer; 6–2, 6–3, 6–2	(Spain) David Ferrer	(Spain) Rafael Nadal (United States) Andy Roddick	(Russia) Nikolay Davydenko (Chile) Fernando González (France) Richard Gasquet (Serbia) Novak Djokovic
12 Nov	Tennis Masters Cup; Shanghai, China; Tennis Masters Cup; Hard (i) – $4,450,000 – 8S/8D (RR); Singles – Doubles	(The Bahamas) Mark Knowles (Canada) Daniel Nestor; 6–2, 6–3	(Sweden) Simon Aspelin (Austria) Julian Knowle	(Spain) Rafael Nadal (United States) Andy Roddick	(Russia) Nikolay Davydenko (Chile) Fernando González (France) Richard Gasquet (Serbia) Novak Djokovic
26 Nov	Davis Cup Final; Portland, Oregon, USA – hard (i)	United States 4–1	Russia		

== ATP rankings ==
As of 25 December 2006
Rk	Name	Nation	Points
1	Roger Federer	SUI	8,370
2	Rafael Nadal	ESP	4,470
3	Nikolay Davydenko	RUS	2,825
4	James Blake	USA	2,530
5	Ivan Ljubičić	CRO	2,495
6	Andy Roddick	USA	2,415
7	Tommy Robredo	ESP	2,375
8	David Nalbandian	ARG	2,295
9	Mario Ančić	CRO	2,060
10	Fernando González	CHI	2,015
11	Tommy Haas	GER	1,890
12	Marcos Baghdatis	CYP	1,860
13	Tomáš Berdych	CZE	1,705
14	David Ferrer	ESP	1,475
15	Jarkko Nieminen	FIN	1,460
16	Novak Djokovic	SRB	1,380
17	Andy Murray	GBR	1,370
18	Richard Gasquet	FRA	1,365
19	Radek Štěpánek	CZE	1,340
20	Lleyton Hewitt	AUS	1,315

Year-end rankings 2007 (31 December 2007)
Rk	Name	Nation	Points	High	Low	Change
1	Roger Federer	SUI	7,180	1	1	Steady
2	Rafael Nadal	ESP	5,735	2	2	Steady
3	Novak Djokovic	SRB	4,470	3	16	▲13
4	Nikolay Davydenko	RUS	2,825	3	5	▼1
5	David Ferrer	ESP	2,750	5	16	▲9
6	Andy Roddick	USA	2,530	3	7	Steady
7	Fernando González	CHI	2,005	5	10	▲3
8	Richard Gasquet	FRA	1,930	7	18	▲10
9	David Nalbandian	ARG	1,775	8	26	▼1
10	Tommy Robredo	ESP	1,765	5	11	▼3
11	Andy Murray	GBR	1,755	8	19	▲6
12	Tommy Haas	GER	1,720	9	13	▼1
13	James Blake	USA	1,710	4	14	▼9
14	Tomáš Berdych	CZE	1,685	9	15	▼1
15	Guillermo Cañas	ARG	1,653	12	142	▲127
16	Marcos Baghdatis	CYP	1,600	11	24	▼4
17	Carlos Moyà	ESP	1,585	15	47	▲26
18	Ivan Ljubičić	CRO	1,580	5	18	▼13
19	Mikhail Youzhny	RUS	1,570	10	25	▲5
20	Juan Ignacio Chela	ARG	1,425	16	40	▲13

Points were awarded as follows:

Tournament Category	Total Financial commitment	W	F	SF	QF	R16	R32	R64	R128	Additional qualifying points
Grand Slam	$6,784,000 to $9,943,000	1000	700	450	250	150	75	35	5	15
Tennis Masters Cup	$4,450,000	750	if undefeated (100 for each round robin match win, +200 for a semifinal win, +250 for the final win)							
ATP Masters Series	$2,450,000 to $3,450,000	500	350	225	125	75	35	5(20)	(5)	15*
International Series Gold	$1,000,000	300	210	135	75	25	15	5		10*
International Series Gold	$800,000	250	175	110	60	25	15	5		10*
International Series	$1,000,000	250	175	110	60	25	15	5		10*
International Series	$800,000	225	155	100	55	20	10	5		10*
International Series	$600,000	200	140	90	50	15(20)	5(10)	(5)		5
International Series	$400,000	175	120	75	40	15	5			5
Challenger	$150,000+H	100	70	45	23	10	1			3
Challenger	$150,000	90	63	40	21	9	1			3
Challenger	$125,000	80	56	36	19	8	1			3
Challenger	$100,000	70	49	31	16	7	1			3
Challenger	$75,000	60	42	27	14	6	1			3
Challenger	$37,500+H	55	38	24	13	5	1			2
Challenger	$25,000+H	50	35	22	12	5	1			2
Futures	$15,000+H	24	16	8	4	1				
Futures	$15,000	18	12	6	3	1				
Futures	$10,000	12	8	4	2	1				

+H: Any Challenger or Futures providing hospitality shall receive the points of the next highest prize money level in that category. $/€25,000+H Challengers receive points shown at$/€50,000. Monies shown for Challengers and Futures are on-site prize amounts.

(*): 5 points only if the Main Draw is larger than 32 (International Series) or 64 (Tennis Masters Series)

In addition to the points allocated above, points are allocated to losers at Grand Slam, Tennis Masters Series and International Series Gold Tournaments qualifying events in the following manner:

- Grand Slams: 8 points for a last round loser, 4 points for a second round loser
- Tennis Masters Series: 8 points for a last round loser(*), 1 point for a first round loser
- International Series Gold: 5 points for a last round loser(*), 1 point for a first round loser,

(*): 3 points only if the Main Draw is larger than 32 (International Series Gold) or 64 (Tennis Masters Series).

== Statistics ==
=== Titles won by player ===
Total titles	Country	Player	Grand Slam	ATP Tour Finals	ATP Tour Masters Series	ATP Tour International Series Gold	ATP Tour International Series
8	SUI	Roger Federer	Australian Open, Wimbledon, US Open	Masters Cup	Hamburg Masters, Cincinnati Masters	Dubai	Basel
6	ESP	Rafael Nadal	French Open		Monte Carlo Masters, Rome Masters, Indian Wells Masters	Stuttgart, Barcelona	
5	SRB	Novak Djokovic			Miami Masters, Rogers Masters	Vienna	Adelaide; Estoril
3	ARG	Juan Mónaco				Kitzbühel	Buenos Aires, Poertschach
3	ESP	David Ferrer				Tokyo	Auckland, Båstad
3	CRO	Ivo Karlović					Houston, Nottingham, Stockholm
2	ARG	David Nalbandian			Madrid Masters, Paris Masters		
2	USA	Andy Roddick					Queen's Club, Washington, D.C.
2	CRO	Ivan Ljubičić					Doha, 's-Hertogenbosch
2	BEL	Xavier Malisse					Chennai, Delray Beach
2	USA	James Blake					Medibank, New Haven
2	FRA	Gilles Simon					Marseille, Bucharest
2	GBR	Andy Murray					San Jose, St. Petersburg
2	FRA	Paul-Henri Mathieu					Casablanca, Gstaad
2	RUS	Dmitry Tursunov					Indianapolis, Bangkok
2	ESP	Tommy Robredo					Sopot, Metz
1	GER	Tommy Haas				Memphis	
1	RUS	Mikhail Youzhny				Rotterdam	
1	ARG	Juan Ignacio Chela				Acapulco	
1	RUS	Nikolay Davydenko					Moscow
1	FRA	Richard Gasquet					Mumbai
1	PER	Luis Horna					Viña del Mar
1	CYP	Marcos Baghdatis					Zagreb
1	ARG	Guillermo Cañas					Costa do Sauípe
1	AUS	Lleyton Hewitt					Las Vegas
1	GER	Philipp Kohlschreiber					Munich
1	ESP	Nicolás Almagro					Valencia
1	CHI	Fernando González					Beijing
1	CZE	Tomáš Berdych					Halle
1	ESP	Carlos Moyà					Umag
1	FRA	Fabrice Santoro					Newport
1	FRA	Sébastien Grosjean					Lyon
1	CZE	Radek Štěpánek					Los Angeles
1	BEL	Steve Darcis					Amersfoort

The following players won their first title:
- (Belgium) Steve Darcis – Amersfoort, Netherlands
- (Croatia) Ivo Karlović – Houston, USA
- Philipp Kohlschreiber – Munich, Germany
- Juan Mónaco – Buenos Aires, Argentina
- Gilles Simon – Marseille, France

Winners/runners-up by country:

#	Country	Wins	Runners-up
1.	Spain	13	12
2.	Switzerland	8	6
3.	France	7	8
4.	Argentina	7	4
5.	Croatia	5	3
6.	Serbia	5	2
7.	(United States) USA	4	7
8.	Russia	4	2
9.	Belgium	3	1
10.	(United Kingdom) Great Britain	2	2
11.	Germany	2	1
12.	Czech Republic	2	0
13.	Chile	1	3
14.	Cyprus	1	2
15.	Australia	1	1
16.	Peru	1	0
17.	Italy	0	4
18.	Austria	0	3
19.	Romania	0	2
20.	Sweden	0	3
	Netherlands	0	1
	Sweden	0	1
	Canada	0	1

== ATP prize money leaders ==
As of 19 November 2007

1.	(Switzerland) Roger Federer	US$10,130,620
2.	(Spain) Rafael Nadal	5,646,935
3.	(Serbia) Novak Djokovic	3,927,700
4.	(Russia) Nikolay Davydenko	2,051,775
5.	(Spain) David Ferrer	1,955,252
6.	(United States) Andy Roddick	1,532,070
7.	(Chile) Fernando González	1,437,130
8.	(France) Richard Gasquet	1,284,790
9.	(Argentina) David Nalbandian	1,230,465
10.	(Czech Republic) Tomáš Berdych	1,126,070

== Retirements ==
Following is a list of notable players (winners of a main tour title, and/or part of the ATP rankings top 100 (singles) or top 50 (doubles) for at least one week) who announced their retirement from professional tennis, became inactive (after not playing for more than 52 weeks), or were permanently banned from playing, during the 2007 season:

- AUS Wayne Arthurs (born 18 March 1971 in Adelaide, Australia) He turned professional in 1990 and reached his career-high singles ranking of no. 44 in 2001. He earned only one career singles title. In doubles, he was ranked no. 11 in 2003 and earned 12 career titles. His last career singles and doubles matches were at Wimbledon.
- DEN Kenneth Carlsen (born April 17, 1973, in Copenhagen, Denmark) He turned professional in 1991 and achieved a career-high ranking of no. 41. He played his last ATP match at the Stockholm Open in October and his last match at a Challenger tournament in Kolding, Denmark a week later against Björn Phau.
- FRA Arnaud Di Pasquale (born 11 February 1979 in Casablanca, Morocco) He turned professional in 1998 and reached his highest ranking of no. 39 in 2000. He won a bronze medal at the 2000 Olympics and played his last match in November 2006 in Asuncion against Guillermo Cañas.
- GBR Tim Henman (born 6 September 1974 in Oxford, England) He turned professional in 1993 and achieved the ranking of world no. 4. He was a four-time semifinalist and four-time quarterfinalist at Wimbledon and reached the semifinals of the French and US Opens once each. He won one Masters 1000 event in Paris in 2003. He played his last match at the Davis Cup competition against Croatia in September.
- CZE Jiří Novák (born March 22, 1975, in Gottwaldov, Czechoslovakia) He turned professional in 1993 and reached a career-high ranking of world no. 5 in 2002. He was a semifinalist at the 2002 Australian Open and won seven career titles. He played his last match in June in Košice, Slovakia against Lukáš Rosol.
- GBR Greg Rusedski (born 6 September 1973, in Montreal, Quebec, Canada) He turned professional in 1991 and reached a career-high ranking of world no. 4. He was a finalist at the US Open in 1997 and earned 15 career titles. He played his last match in March in Sarajevo against Kenneth Carlsen.
- NED Sjeng Schalken (born 8 September 1976 in Weert, Netherlands) He turned professional in 1994 and reached his career-high ranking of no. 11 in 2003. He reached the semifinals of the US Open in 2002 and the quarterfinals at Wimbledon in 2002, 2003, and 2004. He earned nine career singles titles. In doubles, he was ranked no. 21 in 2002 and reached the semifinals of the US Open in 2001 and the quarterfinals at Wimbledon in 2001. He earned six career doubles titles and played his last career match in February 2006 in Bergamo, Italy against Simone Bolelli.

== See also ==
- 2007 in tennis
- 2007 WTA Tour
