= 2007 Torneo Godó =

- Date: 23–29 April
- Edition: 55th
- Category: International Series Gold
- Draw: 56S / 28D
- Prize money: $900,000
- Surface: Clay / Outdoor
- Location: Barcelona, Catalonia, Spain
- Venue: Real Club de Tenis Barcelona

Champions

Singles
- (Spain) Rafael Nadal

Doubles
- (Romania) Andrei Pavel / (Germany) Alexander Waske
← 2006 ·	Barcelona Open	· 2008 →

The 2007 Torneo Godó was a men's professional tennis tournament that was part of the International Series Gold of the 2007 ATP Tour. It was the 55th edition of the Torneo Godó and took place from 23 to 29 April 2007 in Barcelona, Catalonia, Spain. Rafael Nadal won the singles title.

The event also featured a seniors' tournament that was part of the ATP Champions Tour, which was held from 19 to 22 April. Sergi Bruguera won the title.

== Finals ==
=== Singles ===
(Spain) Rafael Nadal defeated (Argentina) Guillermo Cañas 6–3, 6–4

=== Doubles ===
(Romania) Andrei Pavel / (Germany) Alexander Waske defeated (Spain) Rafael Nadal / (Spain) Tomeu Salvà 6–3, 7–6^{(7–1)}

=== Seniors ===
(Spain) Sergi Bruguera defeated (Spain) Jordi Arrese 4–6, 6–1, [10–2]
