= 2007 PBZ Zagreb Indoors =

- Date: 29 January – 4 February
- Edition: 5th
- Category: ATP International Series
- Draw: 16S / 8D
- Prize money: €574,000
- Surface: Carpet / indoor (Taraflex)
- Location: Zagreb, Croatia
- Venue: Dom Sportova

Champions

Singles
- (Cyprus) Marcos Baghdatis

Doubles
- (Germany) Michael Kohlmann / (Germany) Alexander Waske
- PBZ Zagreb Indoors

The 2007 PBZ Zagreb Indoors was a men's tennis tournament played on indoor carpet courts. It was the 5th overall edition of the PBZ Zagreb Indoors event and was part of the ATP International Series of the 2007 ATP Tour. It took place at the ITC Stella Maris in Croatia from 29 January through 4 February 2007. Second-seeded Marcos Baghdatis won the singles title.

== Finals ==
=== Singles ===
(Cyprus) Marcos Baghdatis defeated (Croatia) Ivan Ljubičić 7–6^{(7–4)}, 4–6, 6–4

- It was Baghdatis' only singles title of the year and the 2nd of his career.

=== Doubles ===
(Germany) Michael Kohlmann / (Germany) Christopher Kas defeated (Czech Republic) František Čermák / (Croatia) Jaroslav Levinský, 7–6^{(7–5)}, 4–6, [10–5]
