= Schüttler Waske Tennis-University =

Alexander Waske Tennis-University
- Alexander Waske Tennis-University
- Motto: "Be the best you you can be"
- Type: Sport
- Established: 2010
- Location: Offenbach am Main, Hesse, Germany
- Website: www.tennis-university.com

The Alexander Waske Tennis-University is a tennis academy located in Offenbach am Main near Frankfurt, Germany. The academy was founded in 2010 by two German former Davis Cup players, Alexander Waske and onetime Australian Open finalist Rainer Schüttler. The academy is member of the Hessian Tennis Association. Overall about 30 players, professional, young professional as well as junior players are training permanently in the tennis academy. Others use the coaching staff, around tennis head coach Jakub Záhlava as well as head athletic coach Christian Rauscher, weekly for tournament preparation. Junior players also get the chance to train like the tennis professionals in the year around tennis camps.

== History ==
After a severe elbow injury in the Davis Cup semi-final in Moscow in 2007, German tennis player Alexander Waske founded the Schüttler Waske Tennis-University in 2010, together with former Davis Cup companion Rainer Schüttler. Initially, starting with a head coach, Benjamin Ebrahimzadeh, the academy today has over 10 coaches working with the professional tennis players as well as the juniors on a permanent basis or in the tennis camps. The notable players Benjamin Becker, Janko Tipsarević, and Yen-Hsun Lu used the facilities in 2011 in order to prepare for the clay court season.

In 2011, Angelique Kerber began training at the tennis academy before reaching the semifinals in the 2011 US Open and 2012 Wimbledon. The Tennis-University now continuously trains over 30 German and international professional players, among them Andrea Petkovic, Philipp Petzschner and the German national junior hopes, Louis Wessels, Niklas Schell, Jule Niemeier and Max Wiskandt. Internationally, the Wimbledon Championships boys junior doubles champion Sumit Nagal as well as Chinese Taipei youngster Richard Lin Liang Yu use the tennis academy as their training base.

== Facilities and programs ==
The academy features indoor Rebound Ace courts, seven professional outdoor courts, and auxiliary training facilities. In addition to professional training, it offers a European Tennis Summer School for student athletes as well as summer and fall Tennis-Point Junior Camps for players aged 6–18.
