= 2007 U.S. Men's Clay Court Championships =

- Date: April 9 – 15
- Edition: 39th
- Category: International Series
- Draw: 32S / 16D
- Prize money: $391,000
- Surface: Clay / outdoor
- Location: Houston, TX, United States

Champions

Singles
- (Croatia) Ivo Karlović

Doubles
- (United States) Bob Bryan / (United States) Mike Bryan
← 2006 ·	U.S. Men's Clay Court Championships	· 2008 →

The 2007 U.S. Men's Clay Court Championships was a men's tennis event that was part of the ATP International Series category of the 2007 ATP Tour. It was the 39th edition of the tournament and was played on outdoor clay courts in Houston, Texas, in the United States. Unseeded Ivo Karlović won the singles title and Bob and Mike Bryan won in doubles.

== Finals ==
=== Singles ===
(Croatia) Ivo Karlović defeated (Argentina) Mariano Zabaleta, 6–4, 6–1

=== Doubles ===
(United States) Bob Bryan / (United States) Mike Bryan defeated (The Bahamas) Mark Knowles / (Canada) Daniel Nestor, 7–6^{(7–3)}, 6–4
