= Jakub Záhlava =

Czech-born professional tennis player

- Full name: Jakub Herm-Záhlava
- Country (sports): Germany
- Born: 12 May 1980 (age 46) Plzeň, Czechoslovakia
- Prize money: $88,638

Singles
- Career record: 0–2
- Career titles: 0
- Highest ranking: No. 194 (3 February 2003)

Doubles
- Highest ranking: No. 504 (12 February 2001)

Jakub Herm-Záhlava (born 12 May 1980) is a former professional tennis player from Germany. Born in Plzeň, Czechoslovakia, he is a cousin of Czech tennis player Sandra Záhlavová.

== Biography ==
Záhlava played in the main draw of two ATP Tour level tournaments, Bucharest in 2000 and Stuttgart in 2001. He won the 2002 Wolfsburg Challenger tournament. Playing as a qualifier, he upset second seed Jürgen Melzer en route to the title win. During his career he also had wins over Marin Čilić, Ivo Karlović, Philipp Kohlschreiber and Janko Tipsarević. He played tennis in the German Bundesliga for Mannheim.

As a coach he has worked full-time with Michael Berrer, Louk Sorensen and Tatjana Maria. One of the players that he has coached, Barbora Strýcová, was also his wife from 2006 to 2015. He now coaches at the Schüttler Waske Tennis-University near Frankfurt am Main in Germany.

== Challenger titles ==
=== Singles: (1) ===
No.	Year	Tournament	Surface	Opponent	Score
1.	2002	Wolfsburg, Germany	Carpet	(Belgium) Dick Norman	6–4, 6–2
