= 2007 Allianz Suisse Open Gstaad – Singles =

Singles
- 2007 Allianz Suisse Open Gstaad

Final
- Champion: (France) Paul-Henri Mathieu
- Runner-up: (Italy) Andreas Seppi
- Score: 6–7^{(1–7)}, 6–4, 7–5

Details
- Draw: 32
- Seeds: 8

Events
Singles	Doubles
- Swiss Open

Paul-Henri Mathieu defeated Andreas Seppi 6–7^{(1–7)}, 6–4, 7–5 to win the 2007 Allianz Suisse Open Gstaad singles event.

== Seeds ==
1. (Russia) Nikolay Davydenko (first round)
2. (Russia) Mikhail Youzhny (first round)
3. (France) Richard Gasquet (quarterfinals)
4. (Germany) Philipp Kohlschreiber (second round)
5. (France) Paul-Henri Mathieu (champion)
6. (France) Marc Gicquel (quarterfinals)
7. (Switzerland) Stanislas Wawrinka (first round)
8. (Italy) Potito Starace (second round)

== Draws ==
=== Key ===
- Q – Qualifier
- WC – Wild Card

=== Finals ===
Semifinals					Finals
5	(France) PH Mathieu	6	6
Q	(Czech Republic) R Štěpánek	3	4		5	(France) PH Mathieu	6^{1}	6	7
WC	(Russia) I Andreev	4	6	6^{5}		(Italy) A Seppi	7^{7}	4	5
	(Italy) A Seppi	6	3	7^{7}

=== Section 1 ===
First round
1	(Russia) N Davydenko	6	4	5
(France) G Monfils	3	6	7
(France) F Serra	4	1
Q	(Czech Republic) J Vaněk	6	6
(Spain) F López	6	6
WC	(Switzerland) M Kratochvil	2	3
(Argentina) S Roitman	6^{4}	4
5	(France) PH Mathieu	7^{7}	6
4	(Germany) P Kohlschreiber	7	7^{7}
(Czech Republic) J Hernych	6	6^{3}
Q	(Croatia) M Čilić	5	3
Q	(Czech Republic) R Štěpánek	7	6
(Austria) W Eschauer	6	4	6
WC	(Switzerland) M Lammer	2	6	2
(Argentina) D Hartfield	3	6^{5}
6	(France) M Gicquel	6	7^{7}

Second round
(France) G Monfils	6	6
Q	(Czech Republic) J Vaněk	1	4
(Spain) F López	6	4	6^{4}
5	(France) PH Mathieu	4	6	7^{7}
4	(Germany) P Kohlschreiber	5	3
Q	(Czech Republic) R Štěpánek	7	6
(Austria) W Eschauer	2	6^{4}
6	(France) M Gicquel	6	7^{7}

Quarterfinals
(France) G Monfils	1	6	3
5	(France) PH Mathieu	6	4	6
Q	(Czech Republic) R Štěpánek	6	6
6	(France) M Gicquel	3	3

Semifinals
5	(France) PH Mathieu	6	6
Q	(Czech Republic) R Štěpánek	3	4

=== Section 2 ===
First round
8	(Italy) P Starace	7^{7}	6
(Czech Republic) J Hájek	6^{4}	1
(Spain) Montañés	6	3	4
WC	(Russia) I Andreev	3	6	6
(Belgium) K Vliegen	6	6^{3}	6
(Argentina) G Gaudio	4	7^{7}	4
(Spain) R Ramírez Hidalgo	3	4
3	(France) R Gasquet	6	6
7	(Switzerland) S Wawrinka	5	6	4
(Argentina) M Vassallo Argüello	7	1	6
(Argentina) J Acasuso	5	1
(Ecuador) N Lapentti	7	6
Q	(Spain) B Salvá Vidal	4	0
(Italy) A Seppi	6	6
(Austria) S Koubek	6	6
2	(Russia) M Youzhny	4	3

Second round
8	(Italy) P Starace	3	5
WC	(Russia) I Andreev	6	7
(Belgium) K Vliegen	3	4
3	(France) R Gasquet	6	6
(Argentina) M Vassallo Argüello	6	3	6
(Ecuador) N Lapentti	4	6	4
(Italy) A Seppi	1	7^{7}	7^{8}
(Austria) S Koubek	6	6^{4}	6^{6}

Quarterfinals
WC	(Russia) I Andreev	7	6
3	(France) R Gasquet	5	2
(Argentina) M Vassallo Argüello	4	0
(Italy) A Seppi	6	6

Semifinals
WC	(Russia) I Andreev	4	6	6^{5}
(Italy) A Seppi	6	3	7^{7}
