= 2007 U.S. Men's Clay Court Championships – Doubles =

Doubles
- 2007 U.S. Men's Clay Court Championships

Final
- Champions: (United States) Bob Bryan (United States) Mike Bryan
- Runners-up: (The Bahamas) Mark Knowles (Canada) Daniel Nestor
- Score: 7–6^{(7–3)}, 6–4

Details
- Draw: 16
- Seeds: 4

Events
| Singles | Doubles |
- U.S. Men's Clay Court Championships

Michael Kohlmann and Alexander Waske were the defending champions, but did not participate this year.

Bob Bryan and Mike Bryan won in the final 7–6^{(7–3)}, 6–4, against Mark Knowles and Daniel Nestor.

== Seeds ==
1. (United States) Bob Bryan / (United States) Mike Bryan (champions)
2. (The Bahamas) Mark Knowles / (Canada) Daniel Nestor (final)
3. (United States) Paul Goldstein / (United States) Jim Thomas (quarterfinals)
4. (South Africa) Chris Haggard / (Germany) Rainer Schüttler (quarterfinals)

== Draw ==
Key

- Q = Qualifier
- WC = Wild card
- LL = Lucky loser
- Alt = Alternate
- ITF = ITF entry
- PR = Protected ranking
- SR = Special ranking
- SE = Special exempt
- JE = Junior exempt
- JR = Junior Accelerator Programme entrant
- CO = College Accelerator Programme entrant
- NG = Next Gen Accelerator Program entrant
- w/o = Walkover
- r = Retired
- d = Defaulted

=== Draw ===
First round
1 | (United States) B Bryan (United States) M Bryan | 6 | 6
(United Kingdom) J Auckland (Australia) S Huss | 2 | 2
Alt | (Argentina) J-P Guzmán (Argentina) D Hartfield
WC | (United States) J-M Gambill (United States) D Martin | w/o
3 | (United States) P Goldstein (United States) J Thomas | 6 | 4 | [10]
(United States) T Parrott (United States) S Querrey | 2 | 6 | [7]
(Germany) B Becker (Germany) L Burgsmüller | 3 | 2
WC | (United States) R Kendrick (United States) A Kuznetsov | 6 | 6
(Austria) A Peya (Germany) B Phau | 6 | 6
(Brazil) M Melo (Brazil) A Sá | 4 | 2
(Spain) R Ramírez Hidalgo (Argentina) M Vassallo Argüello | 3 | 4
4 | (South Africa) C Haggard (Germany) R Schüttler | 6 | 6
(United States) A Delić (United States) M Russell | 4 | 6 | [10]
(Australia) A Fisher (United States) J Gimelstob | 6 | 3 | [4]
Alt | (France) N Devilder (Italy) D Sanguinetti | 5 | 1
2 | (The Bahamas) M Knowles (Canada) D Nestor | 7 | 6

Quarterfinals
1 | (United States) B Bryan (United States) M Bryan | 6 | 6
WC | (United States) J-M Gambill (United States) D Martin | 1 | 3
3 | (United States) P Goldstein (United States) J Thomas | 6 | 3 | [6]
WC | (United States) R Kendrick (United States) A Kuznetsov | 2 | 6 | [10]
(Austria) A Peya (Germany) B Phau | 6 | 6
4 | (South Africa) C Haggard (Germany) R Schüttler | 0 | 4
(United States) A Delić (United States) M Russell | 4 | 1
2 | (The Bahamas) M Knowles (Canada) D Nestor | 6 | 6

Semifinals
1 | (United States) B Bryan (United States) M Bryan | 6 | 6
WC | (United States) R Kendrick (United States) A Kuznetsov | 3 | 2
(Austria) A Peya (Germany) B Phau | 6^{2} | 1
2 | (The Bahamas) M Knowles (Canada) D Nestor | 7^{7} | 6

Final
1 | (United States) B Bryan (United States) M Bryan | 7^{7} | 6
2 | (The Bahamas) M Knowles (Canada) D Nestor | 6^{3} | 4
