= 2007 Torneo Godó – Singles =

Singles
- 2007 Torneo Godó

Final
- Champion: (Spain) Rafael Nadal
- Runner-up: (Argentina) Guillermo Cañas
- Score: 6–3, 6–4

Details
- Draw: 56 (5WC/7Q)
- Seeds: 16

Events
Singles	Doubles
- Barcelona Open

Two-time defending champion Rafael Nadal defeated Guillermo Cañas in the final, 6–3, 6–4 to win the singles tennis title at the 2007 Barcelona Open.

With the win, Nadal reached his third consecutive title at this tournament, sharing the record with Mats Wilander who won at the 1982, 1983 and 1984 editions.

== Seeds ==
The first eight seeds received a bye into the second round.

1. (Spain) Rafael Nadal (champion)
2. (Russia) Nikolay Davydenko (quarterfinals)
3. (Spain) Tommy Robredo (third round)
4. (Argentina) David Nalbandian (quarterfinals)
5. (Spain) David Ferrer (semifinals)
6. (Finland) Jarkko Nieminen (third round)
7. (Spain) Juan Carlos Ferrero (second round)
8. (Argentina) Juan Ignacio Chela (third round)
9. (Russia) Dmitry Tursunov (first round)
10. (Czech Republic) Radek Štěpánek (first round)
11. (Russia) Marat Safin (first round)
12. (Argentina) Guillermo Cañas (Runner-up)
13. (Sweden) Robin Söderling (second round)
14. (Spain) Nicolás Almagro (second round)
15. (Argentina) Agustín Calleri (semifinals)
16. (Spain) Carlos Moyá (third round)

== Draw ==
=== Key ===
- WC – Wildcard
- Q – Qualifier
- LL – Lucky loser

=== Finals ===
Quarterfinals
1	(Spain) Rafael Nadal	6	7
(Italy) Potito Starace	2	5
4	(Argentina) David Nalbandian	6^{5}	2
5	(Spain) David Ferrer	7^{7}	6
(Spain) Óscar Hernández	0	3
15	(Argentina) Agustín Calleri	6	6
12	(Argentina) Guillermo Cañas	w/o
2	(Russia) Nikolay Davydenko

Semifinals
1	(Spain) Rafael Nadal	7	6
5	(Spain) David Ferrer	5	1
15	(Argentina) Agustín Calleri	6^{1}	7^{7}	2
12	(Argentina) Guillermo Cañas	7^{7}	6^{5}	6

Finals
1	(Spain) Rafael Nadal	6	6
12	(Argentina) Guillermo Cañas	3	4

=== Earlier rounds ===
==== Section 1 ====
First round
(Italy) Sanguinetti	2	4
(Belgium) Vliegen	6	6
(South Korea) Lee	3	3
(Sweden) Johansson	6	6
(Argentina) Gaudio	1	0
13	(Sweden) Söderling	6	6
11	(Russia) Safin	4	6^{5}
(Italy) Bolelli	6	7^{7}
(Italy) Starace	6	6
(United States) Querrey	4	4
(Russia) Gabashvili	3	6	1
(United States) Spadea	6	3	6

Second round
1	(Spain) Nadal	6	6
(Belgium) Vliegen	1	2
(Sweden) Johansson	7^{7}	7^{7}
13	(Sweden) Söderling	6^{4}	6^{2}
(Italy) Bolelli	4	3
(Italy) Starace	6	6
(United States) Spadea	3	3
8	(Argentina) Chela	6	6

Third round
1	(Spain) Nadal	6	6
(Sweden) Johansson	1	4
(Italy) Starace	6	7^{12}
8	(Argentina) Chela	4	6^{10}

Quarterfinals
1	(Spain) Nadal	6	7
(Italy) Starace	2	5

==== Section 2 ====
First round
(Spain) Martín	6	6
(Colombia) Falla	1	4
Q	(Uzbekistan) Dustov	4	6	0
WC	(Spain) Mantilla	6	1	6
WC	(Spain) Granollers Pujol	2	4
16	(Spain) Moyà	6	6
10	(Czech Republic) Štěpánek	6	3	4
(Romania) Pavel	4	6	6
Q	(Serbia) Pašanski	4
(Argentina) Berlocq	0^{r}
WC	(Spain) Vicente	3	7^{8}	3
(United States) Goldstein	6	6^{6}	6

Second round
4	(Argentina) Nalbandian	6	6
(Spain) Martín	2	0
WC	(Spain) Mantilla	6	3	4
16	(Spain) Moyà	3	6	6
(Romania) Pavel	3	6	2
Q	(Serbia) Pašanski	6	4	6
(United States) Goldstein	0	0
5	(Spain) Ferrer	6	6

Third round
4	(Argentina) Nalbandian	6	6
16	(Spain) Moyà	4	3
Q	(Serbia) Pašanski	2	5
5	(Spain) Ferrer	6	7

Quarterfinals
4	(Argentina) Nalbandian	6^{5}	2
5	(Spain) Ferrer	7^{7}	6

==== Section 3 ====
First round
(Italy) Seppi	6^{2}	7	6
(Croatia) Karlović	7^{7}	5	3
(Germany) Becker	7^{7}	6
(Russia) Kunitsyn	6^{2}	4
(Spain) Hernández	6	6
9	(Russia) Tursunov	4	4
15	(Argentina) Calleri	7	5	6
WC	(Spain) López	5	7	3
(Italy) Galvani	7^{8}	2	6^{1}
Q	(Italy) Lorenzi	6^{6}	6	7^{7}
(Spain) García López	5	3
(Spain) López	7	6

Second round
6	(Finland) Nieminen	6	7
(Italy) Seppi	4	5
(Germany) Becker	1	6^{4}
(Spain) Hernández	6	7^{7}
15	(Argentina) Calleri	6	6
Q	(Italy) Lorenzi	2	2
(Spain) López	2	2
3	(Spain) Robredo	6	6

Third round
6	(Finland) Nieminen	1	7^{8}	3
12	(Spain) Hernández	6	6^{6}	6
15	(Argentina) Calleri	6	2	6
3	(Spain) Robredo	4	6	3

Quarterfinals
(Spain) Hernández	0	3
15	(Argentina) Calleri	6	6

==== Section 4 ====
First round
Q	(Spain) Andújar	6	6
WC	(Spain) Salvà	4	0
(Czech Republic) Vaněk	6	3
Q	(Costa Rica) Marín	0	2^{r}
(Belarus) Mirnyi	2	6^{4}
12	(Argentina) Cañas	6	7^{7}
14	(Spain) Almagro	6	6
Q	(Italy) Fognini	3	2
(Italy) Volandri	6	6
(Russia) Korolev	0	4
Q	(Russia) Schukin	6	6
(Austria) Eschauer	4	4

Second round
7	(Spain) Ferrero	1^{r}
Q	(Spain) Andújar	2
(Czech Republic) Vaněk	1	1
12	(Argentina) Cañas	6	6
14	(Spain) Almagro	7^{7}	4	1
(Italy) Volandri	6^{5}	6	6
Q	(Russia) Schukin	4	6	2
2	(Russia) Davydenko	6	3	6

Third round
Q	(Spain) Andújar	5	3
12	(Argentina) Cañas	7	6
(Italy) Volandri	6^{5}	6^{6}
2	(Russia) Davydenko	7^{7}	7^{7}

Quarterfinals
12	(Argentina) Cañas	w/o
2	(Russia) Davydenko

== Qualifying ==
=== Qualifying seeds ===
1. (Spain) Iván Navarro (first round)
2. (Serbia) Ilija Bozoljac (first round, retired)
3. (Spain) Albert Portas (qualifying competition)
4. (Croatia) Roko Karanušić (qualifying competition)
5. (Spain) Gorka Fraile (first round)
6. (Germany) Denis Gremelmayr (qualifying competition)
7. (Australia) Nathan Healey (qualifying competition)
8. (Uzbekistan) Farrukh Dustov (qualified)
9. (Slovakia) Lukáš Lacko (first round)
10. (Spain) Pablo Andújar (qualified)
11. (Switzerland) George Bastl (first round)
12. (Italy) Paolo Lorenzi (qualified)
13. (Poland) Michał Przysiężny (first round, retired)
14. (Italy) Fabio Fognini (qualified)

=== Qualifiers ===
1. (Uzbekistan) Farrukh Dustov
2. (Russia) Yuri Schukin
3. (Italy) Fabio Fognini
4. (Italy) Paolo Lorenzi
5. (Serbia) Boris Pašanski
6. (Costa Rica) Juan Antonio Marín
7. (Spain) Pablo Andújar

=== Qualifying draw ===
==== First qualifier ====
First round
1	(Spain) Iván Navarro	3	2
(Italy) Flavio Cipolla	6	6
(France) Julien Jeanpierre	5	2
8	(Uzbekistan) Farrukh Dustov	7	6

Qualifying competition
(Italy) Flavio Cipolla	6	3	6^{3}
8	(Uzbekistan) Farrukh Dustov	4	6	7^{7}

==== Second qualifier ====
First round
2	(Serbia) Ilija Bozoljac	4	0^{r}
(Slovakia) Ivo Klec	6	0
(Russia) Yuri Schukin	6	0
13	(Poland) Michał Przysiężny	2	0^{r}

Qualifying competition
(Slovakia) Ivo Klec	4	6	4
(Russia) Yuri Schukin	6	4	6

==== Third qualifier ====
First round
3	(Spain) Albert Portas	7	4	6
WC	(Ukraine) Sergey Bubka	5	6	3
(Austria) Rainer Eitzinger	2	5
14	(Italy) Fabio Fognini	6	7

Qualifying competition
3	(Spain) Albert Portas	5	3
14	(Italy) Fabio Fognini	7	6

==== Fourth qualifier ====
First round
4	(Croatia) Roko Karanušić	6	6
WC	(Spain) Javier Garrapiz-Borderías	0	1
(Australia) Alun Jones	1	6^{1}
12	(Italy) Paolo Lorenzi	6	7^{7}

Qualifying competition
4	(Croatia) Roko Karanušić	3	4
12	(Italy) Paolo Lorenzi	6	6

==== Fifth qualifier ====
First round
5	(Spain) Gorka Fraile	3	4
(Serbia) Boris Pašanski	6	6
(Spain) Marc Fornell Mestres	6	6
11	(Switzerland) George Bastl	1	3

Qualifying competition
(Serbia) Boris Pašanski	6	4	6
(Spain) Marc Fornell Mestres	3	6	3

==== Sixth qualifier ====
First round
6	(Germany) Denis Gremelmayr	5	6	6
WC	(Spain) Albert Ramos Viñolas	7	4	2
Alt	(Costa Rica) Juan Antonio Marín	6	6
9	(Slovakia) Lukáš Lacko	4	3

Qualifying competition
6	(Germany) Denis Gremelmayr	2	6	1
Alt	(Costa Rica) Juan Antonio Marín	6	3	6

==== Seventh qualifier ====
First round
7	(Australia) Nathan Healey	7	6
WC	(Spain) Ignacio Coll Riudavets	5	3
(Italy) Simone Vagnozzi	6^{5}	6	4
10	(Spain) Pablo Andújar	7^{7}	3	6

Qualifying competition
7	(Australia) Nathan Healey	4	3
10	(Spain) Pablo Andújar	6	6
