= 2007 PBZ Zagreb Indoors – Singles =

Singles
- 2007 PBZ Zagreb Indoors

Final
- Champion: (Cyprus) Marcos Baghdatis
- Runner-up: (Croatia) Ivan Ljubičić
- Score: 7–6^{(7–4)}, 4–6, 6–4

Details
- Draw: 32
- Seeds: 8

Events
Singles	Doubles
- PBZ Zagreb Indoors

Marcos Baghdatis defeated Ivan Ljubičić 7–6^{(7–4)}, 4–6, 6–4 to win the 2007 PBZ Zagreb Indoors singles tennis tournament.

== Seeds ==
1. (Croatia) Ivan Ljubičić (finalist)
2. (Cyprus) Marcos Baghdatis (champion)
3. (Sweden) Robin Söderling (second round)
4. (Russia) Mikhail Youzhny (semifinals)
5. (Spain) Fernando Verdasco (first round)
6. (France) Julien Benneteau (first round)
7. (Belgium) Kristof Vliegen (first round)
8. (France) Arnaud Clément (quarterfinals)

== Draw ==
Key

- Q = Qualifier
- WC = Wild card
- LL = Lucky loser
- Alt = Alternate
- ITF = ITF entry
- PR = Protected ranking
- SR = Special ranking
- SE = Special exempt
- JE = Junior exempt
- JR = Junior Accelerator Programme entrant
- CO = College Accelerator Programme entrant
- NG = Next Gen Accelerator Program entrant
- w/o = Walkover
- r = Retired
- d = Defaulted

=== Finals ===
Semifinals
1	(Croatia) I Ljubičić	2	6	7
4	(Russia) M Youzhny	6	3	5
Q	(Austria) A Peya	4	3
2	(Cyprus) M Baghdatis	6	6

Final
1	(Croatia) I Ljubičić	6^{4}	6	4
2	(Cyprus) M Baghdatis	7^{7}	4	6

=== Section 1 ===
First round
1	(Croatia) I Ljubičić	6	6
WC	(Croatia) R Karanušić	4	3
(Spain) F López	6	6^{2}	4
(Austria) S Koubek	2	7^{7}	6
(Sweden) T Johansson	6	6
(Serbia) J Tipsarević	4	4
(Italy) D Bracciali	7	7^{7}
6	(France) J Benneteau	5	6^{4}
4	(Russia) M Youzhny	7^{7}	6
(France) N Mahut	6^{4}	3
Q	(Czech Republic) T Cakl	6	6^{10}	6
(Italy) P Starace	4	7^{12}	4
(France) F Santoro	5	6	6
Q	(Argentina) G Cañas	7	3	2
(France) M Gicquel	6	7^{9}
5	(Spain) F Verdasco	4	6^{7}

Second round
1	(Croatia) I Ljubičić	7^{8}	6^{5}	6
(Austria) S Koubek	6^{6}	7^{7}	3
(Sweden) T Johansson	6	1
(Italy) D Bracciali	3	0^{r}
4	(Russia) M Youzhny	6	6
Q	(Czech Republic) T Cakl	4	2
(France) F Santoro	4	6	4
(France) M Gicquel	6	3	6

Quarterfinals
1	(Croatia) I Ljubičić	7^{10}	6^{8}	7^{7}
(Sweden) T Johansson	6^{8}	7^{10}	6^{4}
4	(Russia) M Youzhny	7	6
(France) M Gicquel	5	2

Semifinals
1	(Croatia) I Ljubičić	2	6	7
4	(Russia) M Youzhny	6	3	5

=== Section 2 ===
First round
7	(Belgium) K Vliegen	7^{7}	6^{6}	3
(France) M Llodra	6^{3}	7^{8}	6
(Czech Republic) J Vaněk	3	2
(Croatia) I Karlović	6	6
(Italy) A Seppi	6	6^{8}	4
Q	(Austria) A Peya	1	7^{10}	6
(France) G Simon	6	6^{5}	6^{4}
3	(Sweden) R Söderling	3	7^{7}	7^{7}
8	(France) A Clément	6	6
WC	(Croatia) M Čilić	4	1
(Czech Republic) L Dlouhý	4	6	7
(Germany) B Phau	6	2	5
(Canada) F Dancevic	6	7^{7}
Q	(Germany) A Waske	3	6^{4}
(France) F Serra	2	6^{5}
2	(Cyprus) M Baghdatis	6	7^{7}

Second round
(France) M Llodra	6	7^{10}
(Croatia) I Karlović	4	6^{8}
Q	(Austria) A Peya	7	4	6
3	(Sweden) R Söderling	5	6	2
8	(France) A Clément	6	7^{7}
(Czech Republic) L Dlouhý	4	6^{5}
(Canada) F Dancevic	6^{1}	3
2	(Cyprus) M Baghdatis	7^{7}	6

Quarterfinals
(France) M Llodra	3	3
Q	(Austria) A Peya	6	6
8	(France) A Clément	2	7^{7}	6^{5}
2	(Cyprus) M Baghdatis	6	6^{2}	7^{7}

Semifinals
Q	(Austria) A Peya	4	3
2	(Cyprus) M Baghdatis	6	6
