= 2007 Allianz Suisse Open Gstaad =

- Date: 9–15 July
- Edition: 62nd
- Category: International Series
- Draw: 32S / 16D
- Prize money: $471,000
- Surface: Clay / outdoor
- Location: Gstaad, Switzerland
- Venue: Roy Emerson Arena

Champions

Singles
- (France) Paul-Henri Mathieu

Doubles
- (Czech Republic) František Čermák / (Czech Republic) Pavel Vízner
- Swiss Open

The 2007 Allianz Suisse Open Gstaad was the 2007 edition of the Allianz Suisse Open Gstaad tennis tournament. The tournament was held on July 9–15. Paul-Henri Mathieu won his second title of the year.

== Finals ==
=== Singles ===
(France) Paul-Henri Mathieu defeated (Italy) Andreas Seppi, 6–7^{(1–7)}, 6–4, 7–5

=== Doubles ===
(Czech Republic) František Čermák / (Czech Republic) Pavel Vízner defeated (France) Marc Gicquel / (France) Florent Serra, 7–5, 5–7, [10–7]
