= 2007 Allianz Suisse Open Gstaad – Doubles =

Doubles
- 2007 Allianz Suisse Open Gstaad

Final
- Champions: (Czech Republic) František Čermák (Czech Republic) Pavel Vízner
- Runners-up: (France) Marc Gicquel (France) Florent Serra
- Score: 7–5, 5–7, [10–7]

Details
- Draw: 16
- Seeds: 4

Events
Singles	Doubles
- Swiss Open

Jiří Novák and Andrei Pavel were the defending champions, but did not participate this year.

František Čermák and Pavel Vízner won in the final 7–5, 5–7, [10–7], against Marc Gicquel and Florent Serra.

== Seeds ==
1. (Czech Republic) František Čermák / (Czech Republic) Pavel Vízner (champions)
2. (Czech Republic) Jaroslav Levinský / (Czech Republic) David Škoch (first round)
3. (Czech Republic) Tomáš Cibulec / (Netherlands) Rogier Wassen (semifinals)
4. (Spain) Albert Montañés / (Spain) Rubén Ramírez Hidalgo (first round)

== Draw ==
Key

- Q = Qualifier
- WC = Wild card
- LL = Lucky loser
- Alt = Alternate
- ITF = ITF entry
- PR = Protected ranking
- SR = Special ranking
- SE = Special exempt
- JE = Junior exempt
- JR = Junior Accelerator Programme entrant
- CO = College Accelerator Programme entrant
- NG = Next Gen Accelerator Program entrant
- w/o = Walkover
- r = Retired
- d = Defaulted

=== Draw ===
First round
1	(Czech Republic) F Čermák (Czech Republic) P Vízner	6	6
(Argentina) J Acasuso (United States) H Armando	2	2
(France) P-H Mathieu (Belgium) K Vliegen	6	4	[8]
WC	(Switzerland) M Kratochvil (Switzerland) M Lammer	2	6	[10]
3	(Czech Republic) T Cibulec (Netherlands) R Wassen	6	4	[10]
WC	(Czech Republic) J Hájek (Czech Republic) J Hernych	2	6	[3]
(Austria) W Eschauer (Czech Republic) J Vaněk	7	6
(Italy) F Fognini (Italy) A Seppi	5	2
(Ecuador) N Lapentti (Spain) F López	6	7^{9}
(Switzerland) Y Allegro (Switzerland) S Wawrinka	3	6^{7}
(Germany) P Kohlschreiber (Austria) S Koubek	6	6
4	(Spain) A Montañés (Spain) R Ramírez Hidalgo	2	2
(Argentina) S Roitman (Italy) P Starace	6	6
(Switzerland) J-C Scherrer (Croatia) L Zovko	4	4
(France) M Gicquel (France) F Serra	6	6
2	(Czech Republic) J Levinský (Czech Republic) D Škoch	4	3

Quarterfinals
1	(Czech Republic) F Čermák (Czech Republic) P Vízner	6	6
WC	(Switzerland) M Kratochvil (Switzerland) M Lammer	4	4
3	(Czech Republic) T Cibulec (Netherlands) R Wassen	6	6
(Austria) W Eschauer (Czech Republic) J Vaněk	3	2
(Ecuador) N Lapentti (Spain) F López	6	5	[10]
(Germany) P Kohlschreiber (Austria) S Koubek	3	7	[8]
(Argentina) S Roitman (Italy) P Starace	3	5
(France) M Gicquel (France) F Serra	6	7

Semifinals
1	(Czech Republic) F Čermák (Czech Republic) P Vízner	6	2	[10]
3	(Czech Republic) T Cibulec (Netherlands) R Wassen	3	6	[4]
(Ecuador) N Lapentti (Spain) F López	6	3	[10]
(France) M Gicquel (France) F Serra	1	6	[12]

Final
1	(Czech Republic) F Čermák (Czech Republic) P Vízner	7	5	[10]
(France) M Gicquel (France) F Serra	5	7	[7]
