= 2007 Torneo Godó – Doubles =

Doubles
- 2007 Torneo Godó

Final
- Champions: (Romania) Andrei Pavel; (Germany) Alexander Waske
- Runners-up: (Spain) Rafael Nadal; (Spain) Bartolomé Salvá Vidal
- Score: 6–3, 7–6^{(7–1)}

Events
Singles	Doubles
← 2006 ·	Torneo Godó	· 2008 →

Mark Knowles and Daniel Nestor were the defending champions, but lost in the quarterfinals this year.

Andrei Pavel and Alexander Waske won in the final 6–3, 7–6^{(7–1)}, against Rafael Nadal and Bartolomé Salvá Vidal.

== Seeds ==
All seeds receive a bye into the second round.

1. (The Bahamas) Mark Knowles / (Canada) Daniel Nestor (quarterfinals)
2. (Australia) Paul Hanley / (Zimbabwe) Kevin Ullyett (quarterfinals)
3. (Israel) Jonathan Erlich / (Israel) Andy Ram (semifinals)
4. (Romania) Andrei Pavel / (Germany) Alexander Waske (champions)
5. (Poland) Mariusz Fyrstenberg / (Poland) Marcin Matkowski (quarterfinals)
6. (Sweden) Simon Aspelin / (Czech Republic) František Čermák (second round)
7. (Austria) Julian Knowle / (Germany) Michael Kohlmann (second round)
8. (Czech Republic) Jaroslav Levinský / (Czech Republic) Petr Pála (second round)

== Draw ==
=== Key ===
- Q = Qualifier
- WC = Wild card
- LL = Lucky loser
- Alt = Alternate
- SE = Special exempt
- PR = Protected ranking
- ITF = ITF entry
- JE = Junior exempt
- w/o = Walkover
- r = Retired
- d = Defaulted
- SR = Special ranking

=== Finals ===
Semifinals

Final

WC
- (Spain) Rafael Nadal
- (Spain) Bartolomé Salvá Vidal
6
6

3
- (Israel) Jonathan Erlich
- (Israel) Andy Ram
4
4

WC
- (Spain) Rafael Nadal
- (Spain) Bartolomé Salvá Vidal
3
6^{1}

4
- (Romania) Andrei Pavel
- (Germany) Alexander Waske
6
7^{7}

4
- (Romania) Andrei Pavel
- (Germany) Alexander Waske
4
6
[10]

- (Spain) Nicolás Almagro
- (Spain) Marcel Granollers-Pujol
6
0
[5]

=== Top half ===
First round

Second round

Quarterfinals

Semifinals

1
- (The Bahamas) M Knowles
- (Canada) D Nestor
4
6
[10]

- (Sweden) T Johansson
- (Serbia) N Zimonjić
6
6

- (Sweden) T Johansson
- (Serbia) N Zimonjić
6
2
[4]

- (United States) P Goldstein
- (United States) S Querrey
2
2

1
- (The Bahamas) M Knowles
- (Canada) D Nestor
6^{1}
3

WC
- (Spain) R Nadal
- (Spain) B Salvá Vidal
6
6

WC
- (Spain) R Nadal
- (Spain) B Salvá Vidal
7^{7}
6

- (Spain) D Ferrer
- (Spain) F Vicente
3
4

WC
- (Spain) R Nadal
- (Spain) B Salvá Vidal
6
6

7
- (Austria) J Knowle
- (Germany) M Kohlmann
0
4

WC
- (Spain) R Nadal
- (Spain) B Salvá Vidal
6
6

3
- (Israel) J Erlich
- (Israel) A Ram
4
4

3
- (Israel) J Erlich
- (Israel) A Ram
7^{10}
6^{6}
[11]

- (Sweden) R Lindstedt
- (Finland) J Nieminen
0
6^{6}

- (Russia) M Safin
- (Russia) D Tursunov
6^{8}
7^{8}
[9]

- (Russia) M Safin
- (Russia) D Tursunov
6
7^{8}

3
- (Israel) J Erlich
- (Israel) A Ram
7^{7}
7^{7}

WC
- (Spain) M López
- (Spain) T Robredo
4
4

5
- (Poland) M Fyrstenberg
- (Poland) M Matkowski
6^{4}
6^{2}

- (India) M Bhupathi
- (Czech Republic) R Štěpánek
6
6

- (India) M Bhupathi
- (Czech Republic) R Štěpánek
5
7^{12}
[10]

5
- (Poland) M Fyrstenberg
- (Poland) M Matkowski
7
6^{10}
[12]

=== Bottom half ===
First round

Second round

Quarterfinals

Semifinals

6
- (Sweden) S Aspelin
- (Czech Republic) F Čermák
6
1
[8]

- (Australia) A Fisher
- (South Africa) C Haggard
4
1

- (Switzerland) Y Allegro
- (United States) J Thomas
3
6
[10]

- (Switzerland) Y Allegro
- (United States) J Thomas
6
6

- (Switzerland) Y Allegro
- (United States) J Thomas
6
3
[11]

- (South Korea) H-t Lee
- (Belgium) K Vliegen
6
3
[10]

4
- (Romania) A Pavel
- (Germany) A Waske
3
6
[13]

- (United States) E Butorac
- (United Kingdom) J Murray
4
6
[7]

- (South Korea) H-t Lee
- (Belgium) K Vliegen
6^{6}
2

4
- (Romania) A Pavel
- (Germany) A Waske
7^{8}
6

4
- (Romania) A Pavel
- (Germany) A Waske
4
6
[10]

- (Spain) N Almagro
- (Spain) M Granollers-Pujol
6
0
[5]

8
- (Czech Republic) J Levinský
- (Czech Republic) P Pála
4
6^{3}

- (Russia) T Gabashvili
- (Italy) P Starace
6
3
[12]

- (Spain) N Almagro
- (Spain) M Granollers-Pujol
6
7^{7}

- (Spain) N Almagro
- (Spain) M Granollers-Pujol
2
6
[14]

- (Spain) N Almagro
- (Spain) M Granollers-Pujol
1
6
[10]

- (Germany) B Becker
- (Germany) C Kas
6^{3}
2

2
- (Australia) P Hanley
- (Zimbabwe) K Ullyett
6
4
[3]

Alt
- (Spain) Ó Hernández
- (Italy) A Seppi
7^{7}
6

Alt
- (Spain) Ó Hernández
- (Italy) A Seppi
3
4

2
- (Australia) P Hanley
- (Zimbabwe) K Ullyett
6
6
