= 2007 U.S. Men's Clay Court Championships – Singles =

Singles
- 2007 U.S. Men's Clay Court Championships

Final
- Champion: (Croatia) Ivo Karlović
- Runner-up: (Argentina) Mariano Zabaleta
- Score: 6–4, 6–1

Details
- Draw: 32 (4Q / 3WC)
- Seeds: 8

Events
Singles	Doubles
- U.S. Men's Clay Court Championships

Unseeded Ivo Karlović defeated Mariano Zabaleta 6–4, 6–1, to win the 2007 U.S. Men's Clay Court Championships singles event. Andy Murray entered the ATP Top 10 for the first time due to Tommy Haas failing to defend his previous year's points.

== Seeds ==
1. (United States) ~~Andy Roddick~~ (withdrew because of a muscle strain)
2. (United States) James Blake (semifinals)
3. (Germany) Tommy Haas (quarterfinals)
4. (United States) Mardy Fish (second round)
5. (Austria) Jürgen Melzer (quarterfinals)
6. (Germany) Benjamin Becker (first round)
7. (United States) Robby Ginepri (first round)
8. (Argentina) Juan Mónaco (quarterfinals)

== Draws ==
=== Key ===
- Q – Qualifier
- WC – Wildcard
- LL – Lucky loser
- W/O – Walkover

=== Finals ===
Semifinals				Finals
	(Spain) Albert Montañés	6^{5}	2
	(Croatia) Ivo Karlović	7	6		(Croatia) Ivo Karlović	6	6
Q	(Argentina) Mariano Zabaleta	7	7	Q	(Argentina) Mariano Zabaleta	4	1
2	(United States) James Blake	5	6^{7}

=== Section 1 ===
First round
LL	(Austria) A Peya	3	2
(Spain) A Montañés	6	6
Q	(Serbia) D Vemić	6	6
(Spain) R Ramírez Hidalgo	3	0
(United States) M Russell	6	6
(United States) P Goldstein	2	0
(United States) V Spadea	6	3	6
7	(United States) R Ginepri	3	6	3
3	(Germany) T Haas	3	6	7
(United States) S Querrey	6	3	5
(France) N Devilder	6	6
WC	(United States) J Gimelstob	2	3
(France) S Grosjean	4	4
(Argentina) D Hartfield	6	6
(Croatia) I Karlović	7	7
6	(Germany) B Becker	5	6^{3}

Second round
(Spain) A Montañés	6	4	6
Q	(Serbia) D Vemić	4	6	4
(United States) M Russell	6^{3}	6	1
(United States) V Spadea	7	2	6
3	(Germany) T Haas	6	6
(France) N Devilder	3	4
(Argentina) D Hartfield
(Croatia) I Karlović	w/o

Quarterfinals
(Spain) A Montañés	6	6
(United States) V Spadea	4	4
3	(Germany) T Haas	6^{7}	4
(Croatia) I Karlović	7	6

Semifinals
(Spain) A Montañés	6^{5}	2
(Croatia) I Karlović	7	6

=== Section 2 ===
First round
5	(Austria) J Melzer	6	3	6
(Germany) R Schüttler	2	6	1
(Romania) V Hănescu	6	6
(Netherlands) M Verkerk	4	4
Q	(Argentina) M Zabaleta	6	7
WC	(United States) R Sweeting	0	6^{8}
(Argentina) M Vassallo Argüello	7	2	5
4	(United States) M Fish	5	6	7
8	(Argentina) J Mónaco	7	6
WC	(United States) JM Gambill	5	4
(United States) A Delić	6	1	7
(United States) R Kendrick	3	6	5
Q	(United States) A Kuznetsov	7	7
LL	(Germany) L Burgsmüller	5	5
Q	(Italy) D Sanguinetti	3	0
2	(United States) J Blake	6	6

Second round
5	(Austria) J Melzer	6	6
(Romania) V Hănescu	4	2
Q	(Argentina) M Zabaleta	7	6
4	(United States) M Fish	5	4
8	(Argentina) J Mónaco	6	6
(United States) A Delić	2	3
Q	(United States) A Kuznetsov	6^{4}	1
2	(United States) J Blake	7	6

Quarterfinals
5	(Austria) J Melzer	1	2
Q	(Argentina) M Zabaleta	6	6
8	(Argentina) J Mónaco	6^{5}	6	6^{0}
2	(United States) J Blake	7	1	7

Semifinals
Q	(Argentina) M Zabaleta	7	7
2	(United States) J Blake	5	6^{7}
