= 2007 PBZ Zagreb Indoors – Doubles =

Doubles
- 2007 PBZ Zagreb Indoors

Final
- Champions: (Germany) Michael Kohlmann (Germany) Alexander Waske
- Runners-up: (Czech Republic) František Čermák (Czech Republic) Jaroslav Levinský
- Score: 7–6^{(7–5)}, 4–6, [10–5]

Details
- Draw: 16
- Seeds: 4

Events
Singles	Doubles
- PBZ Zagreb Indoors

Jaroslav Levinský and Michal Mertiňák were the defending champions but did not participate together this year. Levinský partnered with František Čermák, finishing runner-up. Mertiňák partnered Petr Pála, losing in the first round.

Michael Kohlmann and Alexander Waske won the title, defeating František Čermák and Jaroslav Levinský 7–6^{(7–5)}, 4–6, [10–5] in the final.

== Seeds ==
1. (Israel) Jonathan Erlich / (Israel) Andy Ram (semifinals)
2. (Sweden) Simon Aspelin / (Austria) Julian Knowle (quarterfinals)
3. (Switzerland) Yves Allegro / (France) Fabrice Santoro (quarterfinals)
4. (Czech Republic) František Čermák / (Czech Republic) Jaroslav Levinský (final)

== Draw ==
Key

- Q = Qualifier
- WC = Wild card
- LL = Lucky loser
- Alt = Alternate
- ITF = ITF entry
- PR = Protected ranking
- SR = Special ranking
- SE = Special exempt
- JE = Junior exempt
- JR = Junior Accelerator Programme entrant
- CO = College Accelerator Programme entrant
- NG = Next Gen Accelerator Program entrant
- w/o = Walkover
- r = Retired
- d = Defaulted

=== Draw ===
First round
1	(Israel) J Erlich (Israel) A Ram	7^{7}	7^{7}
(France) G Simon (Serbia) J Tipsarević	6^{2}	6^{3}
(Austria) A Peya (Germany) B Phau	3	4
(Australia) J Kerr (Czech Republic) D Škoch	6	6
3	(Switzerland) Y Allegro (France) F Santoro	7^{7}	4	[10]
(Spain) F López (Spain) F Verdasco	6^{4}	6	[8]
(France) J Benneteau (France) N Mahut	6^{4}	3
(Germany) M Kohlmann (Germany) A Waske	7^{7}	6
WC	(Croatia) M Čilić (Croatia) I Ljubičić	4	6	[12]
(Slovakia) M Mertiňák (Czech Republic) P Pála	6	3	[10]
WC	(Croatia) I Karlović (Croatia) L Zovko	5	6^{3}
4	(Czech Republic) F Čermák (Czech Republic) J Levinský	7	7^{7}
(Czech Republic) T Cibulec (Austria) O Marach	1	4
(Sweden) T Johansson (Sweden) R Lindstedt	6	6
(Germany) T Behrend (Germany) C Kas	6	4	[2]
2	(Sweden) S Aspelin (Austria) J Knowle	3	6	[10]

Quarterfinals
1	(Israel) J Erlich (Israel) A Ram	6^{5}	7	[10]
(Australia) J Kerr (Czech Republic) D Škoch	7^{7}	5	[7]
3	(Switzerland) Y Allegro (France) F Santoro	6^{5}	6^{3}
(Germany) M Kohlmann (Germany) A Waske	7^{7}	7^{7}
WC	(Croatia) M Čilić (Croatia) I Ljubičić
4	(Czech Republic) F Čermák (Czech Republic) J Levinský	w/o
(Sweden) T Johansson (Sweden) R Lindstedt	6^{4}	7	[10]
2	(Sweden) S Aspelin (Austria) J Knowle	7^{7}	5	[8]

Semifinals
1	(Israel) J Erlich (Israel) A Ram	6^{7}	3
(Germany) M Kohlmann (Germany) A Waske	7^{9}	6
4	(Czech Republic) F Čermák (Czech Republic) J Levinský	7^{7}	6
(Sweden) T Johansson (Sweden) R Lindstedt	6^{4}	4

Final
(Germany) M Kohlmann (Germany) A Waske	7^{7}	4	[10]
4	(Czech Republic) F Čermák (Czech Republic) J Levinský	6^{5}	6	[5]
