= Bartolomé Salvá Vidal =

Czech tennis player

Tomeu Salvá
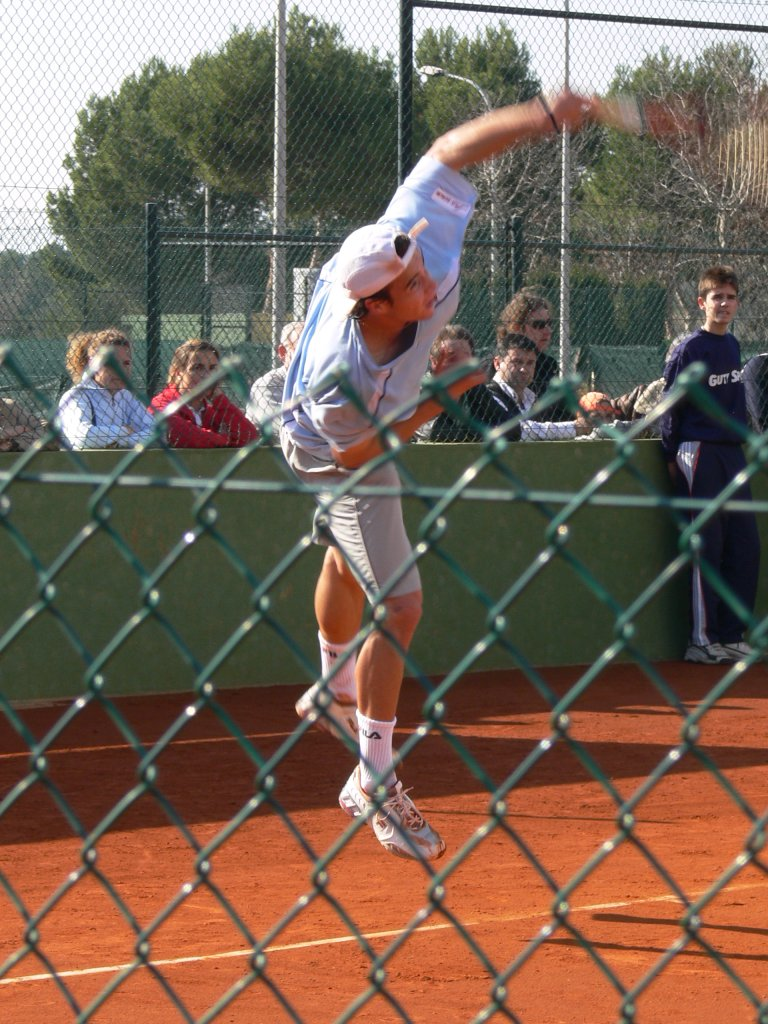
- Salvá serving at an ITF Tour tournament in 2006
- Country (sports): Spain
- Born: 20 November 1986 (age 38); Cala Millor, Mallorca, Spain
- Height: 1.83 m (6 ft 0 in)
- Retired: 2008
- Plays: Left-handed (two-handed backhand)
- Prize money: $104,873

Singles
- Career record: 0–6
- Highest ranking: No. 288 (29 October 2007)

Doubles
- Career record: 8–8
- Highest ranking: No. 133 (3 December 2007)

Bartolomé "Tomeu" Salvá Vidal (born 20 November 1986 in Cala Millor, Mallorca, Balearic Islands) is a Spanish tennis coach and former player.

At the 2007 Torneo Godó, held in Barcelona, Spain, Salvá and Rafael Nadal made it to the final, defeating Jonathan Erlich and Andy Ram (both ranked 13) and Mark Knowles and Daniel Nestor (both ranked fifth) in straight sets on both occasions. In the last round Alexander Waske and Andrei Pavel defeated them 6–3, 7–6^{(1)}.

== ATP Tour finals ==
=== Doubles: 2 (2 runner-ups) ===
Legend Grand Slam tournaments (0–0) Year-end championships (0–0) ATP World Tour Masters 1000 (0–0) Summer Olympics (0–0) ATP World Tour 500 Series (0–1) ATP World Tour 250 Series (0–1)	Titles by surface Hard (0–1) Clay (0–1) Grass (0–0) Carpet (0–0)	Titles by Location Outdoors (0–2) Indoors (0–0)

Result	W–L	Date	Tournament	Tier	Surface	Partner	Opponents	Score
Loss	0–1	Jan 2007	Maharashtra Open, India	International	Hard	(Spain) Rafael Nadal	(Belgium) Xavier Malisse (Belgium) Dick Norman	6–7^{(4–7)}, 6–7^{(4–7)}
Loss	0–2	Apr 2007	Barcelona Open, Spain	Intl. Gold	Clay	(Spain) Rafael Nadal	(Romania) Andrei Pavel (Germany) Alexander Waske	3–6, 6–7^{(1–7)}

== ATP Challenger Tour finals ==
=== Doubles: 1 (1 runner-up) ===
Result	W–L	Date	Tournament	Surface	Partner	Opponents	Score
Loss	0–1	Nov 2007	Asunción, Paraguay	Clay	(Chile) Adrián García	(Argentina) Carlos Berlocq (Argentina) Martín Vassallo Argüello	5–7, 7–6^{(7–5)}, [11–13]
