= Alexander Waske =

German tennis player

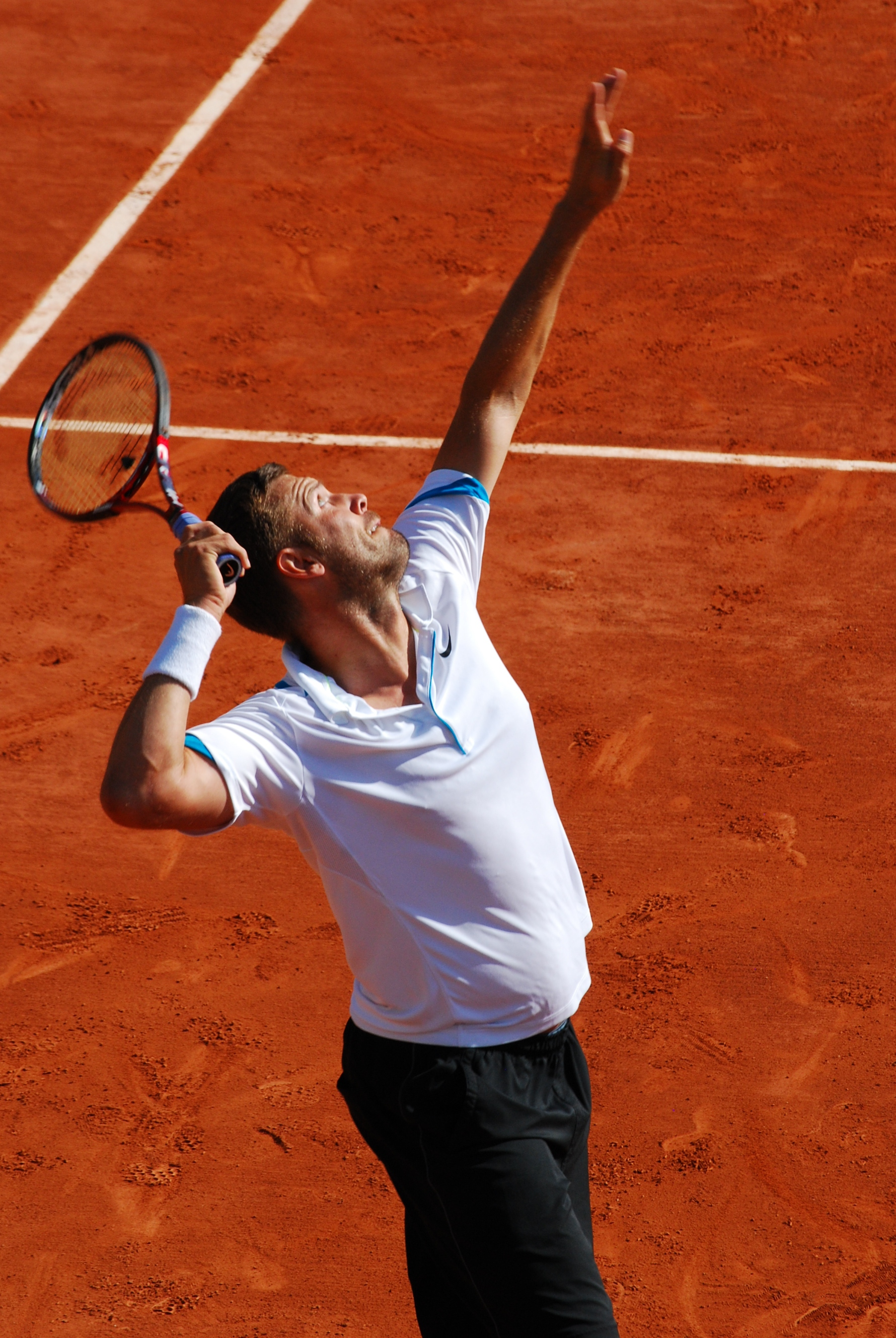
- Country (sports): Germany
- Born: 31 March 1975 (age 50) Frankfurt, West Germany
- Height: 1.88 m (6 ft 2 in)
- Turned pro: 2000
- Retired: 2012
- Plays: Right-handed (one-handed backhand)
- College: San Diego State
- Prize money: $1,339,987

Singles
- Career record: 28–64
- Career titles: 0
- Highest ranking: No. 89 (12 June 2006)

Grand Slam singles results
- Australian Open: 1R (2003, 2006, 2007)
- French Open: 2R (2006)
- Wimbledon: 2R (2002)
- US Open: 1R (2002, 2006, 2007)

Doubles
- Career record: 111–76
- Career titles: 4
- Highest ranking: No. 16 (30 April 2007)

Grand Slam doubles results
- Australian Open: SF (2005)
- French Open: SF (2006)
- Wimbledon: QF (2005)
- US Open: 3R (2006)

Alexander Waske (born 31 March 1975) is a retired tennis player from Germany.

Waske was ranked as high as world No. 16 in doubles, winning four titles. He achieved his career-high singles ranking of world No. 89 in June 2006. In 2010, Waske and his former Davis Cup companion Rainer Schüttler founded the Schüttler Waske Tennis-University, a tennis academy for professional players.

Waske twice beat players in the final qualifying rounds of tournaments who later got into the main draw as lucky losers and caused big historical upsets. In the 2002 Wimbledon final qualifying round at Roehampton, Waske beat George Bastl, before lucky loser Bastl later beat Pete Sampras in the second round of the 2002 Wimbledon tournament, in one of the greatest upsets in tennis history. In the final qualifying round for Indian Wells in 2007, Waske beat Guillermo Cañas, before lucky loser Cañas later beat Roger Federer in the second round of the 2007 Indian Wells tournament, ending Federer's 41–match unbeaten run.

== ATP career finals ==
=== Doubles: 8 (4–4) ===
Legend (singles) Grand Slam tournaments (0–0) ATP World Tour Masters 1000 (0–0) ATP World Tour 500 Series (1–1) ATP World Tour 250 Series (3–3)	Finals by surface Hard (0–2) Clay (3–2) Grass (0–0) Carpet (1–0)

Result	W/L	Date	Tournament	Surface	Partner	Opponents	Score
Loss	0–1	May 2005	Munich, Germany	Clay	(Germany) Florian Mayer	(Croatia) Mario Ančić (Austria) Julian Knowle	3–6, 6–1, 3–6
Win	1–1	Apr 2006	Houston, United States	Clay	(Germany) Michael Kohlmann	(Austria) Julian Knowle (Austria) Jürgen Melzer	5–7, 6–4, [10–5]
Loss	1–2	Apr 2006	Casablanca, Morocco	Clay	(Germany) Michael Kohlmann	(Austria) Julian Knowle (Austria) Jürgen Melzer	3–6, 4–6
Win	2–2	May 2006	Munich, Germany	Clay	(Romania) Andrei Pavel	(Austria) Alexander Peya (Germany) Björn Phau	6–4, 6–2
Win	3–2	Jan 2007	Zagreb, Croatia	Carpet (i)	(Germany) Michael Kohlmann	(Czech Republic) František Čermák (Czech Republic) Jaroslav Levinský	7–6^{(7–5)}, 4–6, [10–5]
Loss	3–3	Feb 2007	Rotterdam, Netherlands	Hard (i)	(Romania) Andrei Pavel	(Czech Republic) Martin Damm (India) Leander Paes	3–6, 7–6^{(7–5)}, [8–10]
Win	4–3	Apr 2007	Barcelona, Spain	Clay	(Romania) Andrei Pavel	(Spain) Rafael Nadal (Spain) Bartolomé Salvá-Vidal	6–3, 7–6^{(7–1)}
Loss	4–4	Oct 2011	Bangkok, Thailand	Hard (i)	(Germany) Michael Kohlmann	(Austria) Oliver Marach (Pakistan) Aisam-ul-Haq Qureshi	6–7^{(4–7)}, 6–7^{(5–7)}

== Grand Slam performance timelines ==
Key
W	F	SF	QF	#R	RR	Q#	DNQ	A	NH

(W) winner; (F) finalist; (SF) semifinalist; (QF) quarterfinalist; (#R) rounds 4, 3, 2, 1; (RR) round-robin stage; (Q#) qualification round; (DNQ) did not qualify; (A) absent; (NH) not held; (SR) strike rate (events won / competed); (W–L) win–loss record.

=== Singles ===
Tournament	2002	2003	2006	2007	SR	W–L
Australian Open		1R	1R	1R	0 / 3	0–3
French Open		1R	2R		0 / 2	1–2
Wimbledon	2R	1R	1R		0 / 3	1–3
US Open	1R		1R	1R	0 / 3	0–3
Win–loss	1–2	0–3	1–4	0–2	0 / 11	2–11

=== Doubles ===
Tournament	2002	2005	2006	2007	2009	2011	2012	SR	W–L
Australian Open		SF	1R	3R				0 / 3	6–3
French Open		3R	SF	3R	3R	2R	1R	0 / 6	11–6
Wimbledon	2R	QF	1R			1R		0 / 4	4–4
US Open		1R	3R	2R		2R		0 / 4	4–4
Win–loss	1–1	9–4	6–4	5–3	2–1	2–3	0–1	0 / 17	25–17

== Wins over top 10 players ==
#	Player	Rank	Tournament	Surface	Rd	Score
2002
1.	(Spain) Carlos Moyá	10	Japan Open, Japan	Hard	2R	6–4, 7–5
2005
2.	(Spain) Rafael Nadal	3	Halle Open, Germany	Grass	1R	4–6, 7–5, 6–3
