= 2004 BMW Open – Singles =

Singles
- 2004 BMW Open

Final
- Champion: (Russia) Nikolay Davydenko
- Runner-up: (Netherlands) Martin Verkerk
- Score: 6–4, 7–5

Details
- Draw: 32 (4 Q / 3 WC )
- Seeds: 8

Events
Singles	Doubles
← 2003 ·	BMW Open	· 2005 →

Roger Federer was the defending champion but did not compete that year.

Nikolay Davydenko won in the final 6–4, 7–5 against Martin Verkerk.

== Seeds ==
1. (Germany) Rainer Schüttler (quarterfinals)
2. (Thailand) Paradorn Srichaphan (first round)
3. (Czech Republic) Jiří Novák (second round)
4. (Netherlands) Martin Verkerk (final)
5. (United States) Vince Spadea (second round)
6. (Romania) Andrei Pavel (first round)
7. (United States) Taylor Dent (second round)
8. (United States) James Blake (first round)

== Draw ==
=== Key ===
- Q = Qualifier
- WC = Wild card
- LL = Lucky loser
- Alt = Alternate
- SE = Special exempt
- PR = Protected ranking
- ITF = ITF entry
- JE = Junior exempt
- w/o = Walkover
- r = Retired
- d = Defaulted
- SR = Special ranking

=== Finals ===
Semifinals
(Russia) Nikolay Davydenko	6	6
(Peru) Luis Horna	4	1
4	(Netherlands) Martin Verkerk	7^{7}	6
(Belgium) Olivier Rochus	6^{2}	3

Final
(Russia) Nikolay Davydenko	6	7
4	(Netherlands) Martin Verkerk	4	5

=== Top half ===
First round
1	(Germany) R Schüttler	6	7^{7}
(Sweden) R Söderling	4	6^{5}
WC	(Germany) T Haas	6	6
(Czech Republic) B Ulihrach	3	2
(Germany) L Burgsmüller	2	6^{5}
(Romania) V Hănescu	6	7^{7}
(Russia) N Davydenko	7^{7}	6
6	(Romania) A Pavel	6^{3}	4
3	(Czech Republic) J Novák	6	6
(Russia) M Youzhny	4	2
(Slovakia) K Kučera	3	5
(Czech Republic) R Štěpánek	6	7
(Peru) L Horna	6	6
(France) O Mutis	4	1
(France) A Dupuis	6^{5}	6^{2}
7	(United States) T Dent	7^{7}	7^{7}

Second round
1	(Germany) R Schüttler	6	2	6
WC	(Germany) T Haas	4	6	4
(Romania) V Hănescu	7^{8}	2	4
(Russia) N Davydenko	6^{6}	6	6
3	(Czech Republic) J Novák	3	5
(Czech Republic) R Štěpánek	6	7
(Peru) L Horna	4	1
7	(United States) T Dent	6	3^{r}

Quarterfinals
1	(Germany) R Schüttler	1	6^{4}
(Russia) N Davydenko	6	7^{7}
(Czech Republic) R Štěpánek	6^{6}	6^{2}
(Peru) L Horna	7^{8}	7^{7}

Semifinals
(Russia) N Davydenko	6	6
(Peru) L Horna	4	1

=== Bottom half ===
First round
8	(United States) J Blake	4	6^{6}
(Armenia) S Sargsian	6	7^{8}
Q	(Switzerland) M Kratochvil	6	4	6
(Belgium) X Malisse	4	6	3
(South Africa) W Moodie	4	3
Q	(Serbia and Montenegro) B Pašanski	6	6
(Sweden) J Johansson	4	2
4	(Netherlands) M Verkerk	6	6
5	(United States) V Spadea	6	6
Q	(Germany) D Kindlmann	4	2
WC	(Croatia) G Ivanišević	4	6^{0}
Q	(Germany) A Waske	6	7^{7}
(Denmark) K Carlsen	6^{7}	4
WC	(Germany) P Kohlschreiber	7^{9}	6
(Belgium) O Rochus	6	6
2	(Thailand) P Srichaphan	3	2

Second round
(Armenia) S Sargsian	2	4
Q	(Switzerland) M Kratochvil	6	6
Q	(Serbia and Montenegro) B Pašanski	6^{3}	6^{4}
4	(Netherlands) M Verkerk	7^{7}	7^{7}
5	(United States) V Spadea	6	5	6^{4}
Q	(Germany) A Waske	3	7	7^{7}
WC	(Germany) P Kohlschreiber	6^{4}	2
(Belgium) O Rochus	7^{7}	6

Quarterfinals
Q	(Switzerland) M Kratochvil	3	6^{0}
4	(Netherlands) M Verkerk	6	7^{7}
Q	(Germany) A Waske	6	3	4
(Belgium) O Rochus	3	6	6

Semifinals
4	(Netherlands) M Verkerk	7^{7}	6
(Belgium) O Rochus	6^{2}	3
