= 2006 BMW Open =

- Date: 1–8 May
- Edition: 91st
- Category: International Series
- Draw: 32S / 16D
- Prize money: $355,000
- Surface: Clay / outdoor
- Location: Munich, Germany
- Venue: MTTC Iphitos

Champions

Singles
- (Belgium) Olivier Rochus

Doubles
- (Romania) Andrei Pavel / (Germany) Alexander Waske
← 2005 ·	BMW Open	· 2007 →

The 2006 BMW Open was an Association of Tennis Professionals men's tennis tournament held in Munich, Germany. The tournament was held from 1 May until 8 May 2006. Fifth-seeded Olivier Rochus won the singles title.

== Finals ==
=== Singles ===
(Belgium) Olivier Rochus defeated (Belgium) Kristof Vliegen 6–4, 6–2

- It was Rochus' only title of the year and the 4th of his career.

=== Doubles ===
(Romania) Andrei Pavel / (Germany) Alexander Waske defeated (Austria) Alexander Peya / (Germany) Björn Phau 6–4, 6–2

- It was Pavel's 3rd title of the year and the 8th of his career. It was Waske's 2nd title of the year and the 2nd of his career.
