= 2009 If Stockholm Open =

- Date: 17–25 October
- Edition: 41st
- Category: ATP World Tour 250
- Draw: 32S / 16D
- Prize money: €531,000
- Surface: Hard / indoor
- Location: Stockholm, Sweden
- Venue: Kungliga tennishallen

Champions

Singles
- (Cyprus) Marcos Baghdatis

Doubles
- (Brazil) Bruno Soares / (Zimbabwe) Kevin Ullyett
← 2008 ·	Stockholm Open	· 2010 →

The 2009 If Stockholm Open was a men's tennis tournament played on indoor hard courts. It was the 41st edition of the event known that year as the If Stockholm Open, and was part of the ATP World Tour 250 Series of the 2009 ATP World Tour. It was held at the Kungliga tennishallen in Stockholm, Sweden, from 17 October through 25 October 2009. Unseeded Marcos Baghdatis won the singles title.

== ATP entrants ==
=== Seeds ===
Country	Player	Rank^{1}	Seed
SWE	Robin Söderling	11	1
GER	Tommy Haas	18	2
ESP	Juan Carlos Ferrero	21	3
ARG	Juan Mónaco	28	4
GER	Andreas Beck	36	5
GER	Benjamin Becker	38	6
ESP	Albert Montañés	39	7
ESP	Feliciano López	41	8

- seeds are based on the rankings of October 12, 2009

=== Other entrants ===
The following players received wildcards into the singles main draw:

- (Sweden) Andreas Vinciguerra
- (Sweden) Joachim Johansson
- (Bulgaria) Grigor Dimitrov

The following players received entry from the qualifying draw:

- (Germany) Michael Berrer
- (France) Arnaud Clément
- (Finland) Henri Kontinen
- (Denmark) Frederik Nielsen

The following players received entry as a Lucky loser:

- (Ecuador) Giovanni Lapentti

== Finals ==
=== Singles ===
(Cyprus) Marcos Baghdatis defeated (Belgium) Olivier Rochus, 6–1, 7–5

- It was Baghdatis' first title of the year and 3rd of his career.

=== Doubles ===
(Brazil) Bruno Soares / (Zimbabwe) Kevin Ullyett defeated (Sweden) Simon Aspelin / (Australia) Paul Hanley, 6–4, 7–6^{(7–4)}
