= 2006 BMW Open – Doubles =

Doubles
- 2006 BMW Open

Final
- Champions: (Romania) Andrei Pavel (Germany) Alexander Waske
- Runners-up: (Austria) Alexander Peya (Germany) Björn Phau
- Score: 6–4, 6–2

Events
Singles	Doubles
← 2005 ·	BMW Open	· 2007 →

Mario Ančić and Julian Knowle were the defending champions. Ančić did not participate this year. Knowle partnered with Jürgen Melzer, losing in the first round.

Andrei Pavel and Alexander Waske won in the final 6–4, 6–2, against Alexander Peya and Björn Phau.

== Seeds ==
1. (Austria) Julian Knowle / (Austria) Jürgen Melzer (first round)
2. (South Africa) Chris Haggard / (Croatia) Ivo Karlović (quarterfinals)
3. (United States) Travis Parrott / (Netherlands) Rogier Wassen (first round)
4. (Slovakia) Michal Mertiňák / (Czech Republic) Petr Pála (first round)

== Draw ==
=== Key ===
- Q = Qualifier
- WC = Wild card
- LL = Lucky loser
- Alt = Alternate
- SE = Special exempt
- PR = Protected ranking
- ITF = ITF entry
- JE = Junior exempt
- w/o = Walkover
- r = Retired
- d = Defaulted
- SR = Special ranking

=== Draw ===
First round
1	(Austria) J Knowle (Austria) J Melzer	6^{0}	1
(Australia) S Huss (United States) T Phillips	7^{7}	6
(Germany) M Kohlmann (Germany) R Schüttler	6	3	[12]
(France) F Serra (Thailand) P Srichaphan	1	6	[10]
3	(United States) T Parrott (Netherlands) R Wassen	3	6	[6]
(Romania) A Pavel (Germany) A Waske	6	1	[10]
(Argentina) G Coria (Argentina) J Mónaco	6	3	[13]
(South Africa) J Coetzee (United States) J Thomas	4	6	[11]
(Sweden) R Lindstedt (Finland) J Nieminen	6	6
(Belgium) O Rochus (Belgium) K Vliegen	3	3
WC	(Germany) P Kohlschreiber (Germany) F Mayer	6	7
4	(Slovakia) M Mertiňák (Czech Republic) P Pála	4	5
WC	(Austria) A Peya (Germany) B Phau	4	7^{7}	[10]
(Germany) C Kas (Germany) P Petzschner	6	6^{1}	[7]
(Switzerland) Y Allegro (Russia) M Youzhny	3	3
2	(South Africa) C Haggard (Croatia) I Karlović	6	6

Quarterfinals
(Australia) S Huss (United States) T Phillips	4	3
(Germany) M Kohlmann (Germany) R Schüttler	6	6
(Romania) A Pavel (Germany) A Waske	6	6
(Argentina) G Coria (Argentina) J Mónaco	1	4
(Sweden) R Lindstedt (Finland) J Nieminen	6^{5}	6	[10]
WC	(Germany) P Kohlschreiber (Germany) F Mayer	7^{7}	3	[6]
WC	(Austria) A Peya (Germany) B Phau	6	7^{7}
2	(South Africa) C Haggard (Croatia) I Karlović	4	6^{3}

Semifinals
(Germany) M Kohlmann (Germany) R Schüttler	4	6	[9]
(Romania) A Pavel (Germany) A Waske	6	3	[11]
(Sweden) R Lindstedt (Finland) J Nieminen	6	6^{4}	[8]
WC	(Austria) A Peya (Germany) B Phau	2	7^{7}	[10]

Final
(Romania) A Pavel (Germany) A Waske	6	6
WC	(Austria) A Peya (Germany) B Phau	4	2
