= David Nalbandian career statistics =

Career finals
Discipline	Type	Won	Lost	Total	WR
Singles	Grand Slam tournaments	–	1	1	0.00
Singles	Year-end championships	1	–	1	1.00
Singles	ATP Masters 1000*	2	4	6	0.33
Singles	Olympic Games	–	–	–	–
Singles	ATP Tour 500	1	1	2	0.50
Singles	ATP Tour 250	7	7	14	0.50
Singles	Total	11	13	24	0.46
Doubles	Grand Slam tournaments	–	–	–	–
Doubles	Year-end championships	–	–	–	–
Doubles	ATP Masters 1000*	–	–	–	–
Doubles	Olympic Games	–	–	–	–
Doubles	ATP Tour 500	–	–	–	–
Doubles	ATP Tour 250	–	1	1	0.00
Doubles	Total	–	1	1	0.00
Total		11	14	25	0.44
1) WR = Winning rate 2) * formerly known as "Super 9" (1996–1999), "Tennis Masters Series" (2000–2003) or "ATP Masters Series" (2004–2008).

This is a list of the main career statistics of Argentine professional tennis player David Nalbandian.

== Significant finals ==
=== Grand Slam finals ===
==== Singles: 1 (1 runner-up) ====
Result	Year	Championship	Surface	Opponent	Score
Loss	2002	Wimbledon	Grass	(Australia) Lleyton Hewitt	1–6, 3–6, 2–6

=== Year-end championships finals ===
==== Singles: 1 (1 title) ====
Result	Year	Championship	Surface	Opponent	Score
Win	2005	Tennis Masters Cup	Carpet (i)	(Switzerland) Roger Federer	6–7^{(4–7)}, 6–7^{(11–13)}, 6–2, 6–1, 7–6^{(7–3)}

=== Masters 1000 finals ===
==== Singles: 6 (2 titles, 4 runners-up) ====
Result	Year	Tournament	Surface	Opponent	Score
Loss	2003	Canada Masters	Hard	(United States) Andy Roddick	1–6, 3–6
Loss	2004	Rome Masters	Clay	(Spain) Carlos Moyá	3–6, 3–6, 1–6
Loss	2004	Madrid Masters	Hard (i)	(Russia) Marat Safin	2–6, 4–6, 3–6
Win	2007	Madrid Masters	Hard (i)	(Switzerland) Roger Federer	1–6, 6–3, 6–3
Win	2007	Paris Masters	Hard (i)	(Spain) Rafael Nadal	6–4, 6–0
Loss	2008	Paris Masters	Hard (i)	(France) Jo-Wilfried Tsonga	3–6, 6–4, 4–6

== ATP career finals ==
=== Singles: 24 (11 titles, 13 runners-up) ===
Legend Grand Slam tournaments (0–1) ATP World Tour Finals (1–0) ATP World Tour Masters 1000 (2–4) ATP World Tour 500 Series (1–1) ATP World Tour 250 Series (7–7)	Titles by surface Hard (5–5) Clay (4–4) Grass (0–2) Carpet (2–2)	Titles by setting Outdoors (6–7) Indoors (5–6)

Result	W/L	Date	Tournament	Tier	Surface	Opponent	Score
Loss	0–1	Oct 2001	Campionati Internazionali di Sicilia, Palermo, Italy	International	Clay	(Spain) Félix Mantilla	6–7^{(2–7)}, 4–6
Win	1–1	Apr 2002	Portugal Open, Estoril, Portugal	International	Clay	(Finland) Jarkko Nieminen	6–4, 7–6^{(7–5)}
Loss	1–2	Jul 2002	Wimbledon, London, United Kingdom	Grand Slam	Grass	(Australia) Lleyton Hewitt	1–6, 3–6, 2–6
Win	2–2	Oct 2002	Swiss Indoors, Basel, Switzerland	International	Carpet (i)	(Chile) Fernando González	6–4, 6–3, 6–2
Loss	2–3	Aug 2003	Canada Masters, Montréal, Canada	Masters	Hard	(United States) Andy Roddick	1–6, 3–6
Loss	2–4	Oct 2003	Swiss Indoors, Basel, Switzerland	International	Carpet (i)	(Argentina) Guillermo Coria	w/o
Loss	2–5	May 2004	Rome Masters, Rome, Italy	Masters	Clay	(Spain) Carlos Moyá	3–6, 3–6, 1–6
Loss	2–6	Oct 2004	Madrid Masters, Madrid, Spain	Masters	Hard (i)	(Russia) Marat Safin	2–6, 4–6, 3–6
Loss	2–7	Oct 2004	Swiss Indoors, Basel, Switzerland	International	Carpet (i)	(Czech Republic) Jiří Novák	7–5, 3–6, 4–6, 6–1, 2–6
Win	3–7	May 2005	Bavarian Championships, Munich, Germany	International	Clay	(Romania) Andrei Pavel	6–4, 6–1
Win	4–7	Nov 2005	Tennis Masters Cup, Shanghai, China	ATP Finals	Carpet (i)	(Switzerland) Roger Federer	6–7^{(4–7)}, 6–7^{(11–13)}, 6–2, 6–1, 7–6^{(7–3)}
Win	5–7	May 2006	Portugal Open, Estoril, Portugal	International	Clay	(Russia) Nikolay Davydenko	6–3, 6–4
Win	6–7	Oct 2007	Madrid Masters, Madrid, Spain	Masters	Hard (i)	(Switzerland) Roger Federer	1–6, 6–3, 6–3
Win	7–7	Nov 2007	Paris Masters, Paris, France	Masters	Hard (i)	(Spain) Rafael Nadal	6–4, 6–0
Win	8–7	Feb 2008	Argentina Open, Buenos Aires, Argentina	International	Clay	(Argentina) José Acasuso	3–6, 7–6^{(7–5)}, 6–4
Loss	8–8	Mar 2008	Mexican Open, Acapulco, Mexico	International Gold	Clay	(Spain) Nicolás Almagro	1–6, 6–7^{(1–7)}
Win	9–8	Oct 2008	Stockholm Open, Stockholm, Sweden	International	Hard (i)	(Sweden) Robin Söderling	6–2, 5–7, 6–3
Loss	9–9	Oct 2008	Swiss Indoors, Basel, Switzerland	International	Hard (i)	(Switzerland) Roger Federer	3–6, 4–6
Loss	9–10	Nov 2008	Paris Masters, Paris, France	Masters	Hard (i)	(France) Jo-Wilfried Tsonga	3–6, 6–4, 4–6
Win	10–10	Jan 2009	Sydney International, Sydney, Australia	250 Series	Hard	(Finland) Jarkko Nieminen	6–3, 6–7^{(9–11)}, 6–2
Win	11–10	Aug 2010	Washington Open, Washington, United States	500 Series	Hard	(Cyprus) Marcos Baghdatis	6–2, 7–6^{(7–4)}
Loss	11–11	Jan 2011	ATP Auckland Open, Auckland, New Zealand	250 Series	Hard	(Spain) David Ferrer	3–6, 2–6
Loss	11–12	Jun 2012	Queen's Club Championships, London, UK	250 Series	Grass	(Croatia) Marin Čilić	7–6^{(7–3)}, 3–4 default
Loss	11–13	Feb 2013	Brasil Open, São Paulo, Brazil	250 Series	Clay (i)	(Spain) Rafael Nadal	2–6, 3–6

=== Doubles: 1 (1 runner-up) ===
Legend Grand Slam tournaments (0–0) ATP World Tour Finals (0–0) ATP World Tour Masters 1000 (0–0) ATP World Tour 500 Series (0–0) ATP World Tour 250 Series (0–1)	Titles by surface Hard (0–0) Clay (0–1) Grass (0–0) Carpet (0–0)	Titles by setting Outdoors (0–1) Indoors (0–0)

Result	W/L	Date	Tournament	Surface	Partner	Opponents	Score
Loss	0–1	Feb 2003	ATP Buenos Aires, Buenos Aires, Argentina	Clay	(Argentina) Lucas Arnold Ker	(Argentina) Mariano Hood (Argentina) Sebastián Prieto	2–6, 2–6

== Other finals ==
=== Team competition: 3 (3 runners-up) ===
Result	No.	Date	Tournament	Surface	Partner	Opponents	Score
Loss	1.	December 1–3, 2006	Davis Cup, Moscow, Russia	Carpet (i)	(Argentina) José Acasuso (Argentina) Agustín Calleri (Argentina) Juan Ignacio Chela	(Russia) Marat Safin (Russia) Nikolay Davydenko (Russia) Mikhail Youzhny (Russia) Dmitry Tursunov	2–3
Loss	2.	November 21–23, 2008	Davis Cup, Mar del Plata, Argentina	Hard (i)	(Argentina) Juan Martín del Potro (Argentina) José Acasuso (Argentina) Agustín Calleri	(Spain) David Ferrer (Spain) Fernando Verdasco (Spain) Feliciano López (Spain) Marcel Granollers	1–3
Loss	3.	December 2–4, 2011	Davis Cup, Seville, Spain	Clay (i)	(Argentina) Juan Martín del Potro (Argentina) Juan Mónaco (Argentina) Eduardo Schwank	(Spain) Rafael Nadal (Spain) David Ferrer (Spain) Fernando Verdasco (Spain) Feliciano López	1–3

== Junior Grand Slam finals ==
=== Singles: 2 (1 title, 1 runner-up) ===
Result	Year	Tournament	Surface	Opponent	Score
Win	1998	US Open	Hard	(Switzerland) Roger Federer	6–3, 7–5
Loss	1999	French Open	Clay	(Argentina) Guillermo Coria	4–6, 3–6

=== Doubles: 1 (1 title) ===
Result	Year	Tournament	Surface	Partner	Opponents	Score
Win	1999	Wimbledon	Grass	(Argentina) Guillermo Coria	(Bulgaria) Todor Enev (Finland) Jarkko Nieminen	7–5, 6–4

=== Exhibition tournaments: 8 (8 titles) ===
Result	No.	Date	Championship	Surface	Opponent	Score	Draw
Win	1.	17 January 2004	AAMI Classic, Kooyong, Australia	Hard	(United States) Andre Agassi	6–2, 6–3	8
Win	2.	11 December 2005	Indoor Master Tennis – Córdoba, Argentina	Carpet (i)	(Argentina) Mariano Puerta	6–3, 6–4	4
Win	3.	18 December 2005	Copa Argentina – Buenos Aires, Argentina	Hard	(Argentina) Agustín Calleri	3–6, 6–2, 6–3	12
Win	4.	11 December 2006	Indoor Master Tennis – Córdoba, Argentina	Carpet (i)	(Chile) Nicolás Massú	6–4, 6–3	12
Win	5.	16 December 2007	Copa Argentina – Buenos Aires, Argentina	Hard	(Argentina) Juan Mónaco	6–4, 7–5	8
Win	6.	13 December 2009	Copa Minero – San Juan, Argentina	Carpet (i)	(Argentina) Gastón Gaudio	6–2, 6–2	4
Win	7.	20 December 2009	Copa Argentina – Buenos Aires, Argentina	Hard	(Cyprus) Marcos Baghdatis	6–4, 6–4	6
Win	8.	19 December 2010	Copa Argentina – Buenos Aires, Argentina	Hard	(Argentina) Juan Mónaco	6–3, 7–6^{(7–5)}	

== Performance timelines ==
Key
W	F	SF	QF	#R	RR	Q#	P#	DNQ	A	Z#	PO	G	S	B	NMS	NTI	P	NH

(W) winner; (F) finalist; (SF) semifinalist; (QF) quarterfinalist; (#R) rounds 4, 3, 2, 1; (RR) round-robin stage; (Q#) qualification round; (P#) preliminary round; (DNQ) did not qualify; (A) absent; (Z#) Davis/Fed Cup Zonal Group (with number indication) or (PO) play-off; (G) gold, (S) silver or (B) bronze Olympic/Paralympic medal; (NMS) not a Masters tournament; (NTI) not a Tier I tournament; (P) postponed; (NH) not held; (SR) strike rate (events won / competed); (W–L) win–loss record.

Davis Cup matches are included in the statistics. Walkovers or qualifying matches are neither official wins nor losses.

=== Singles ===
Tournament	2000	2001	2002	2003	2004	2005	2006	2007	2008	2009	2010	2011	2012	2013	SR	W–L	Win %
Grand Slam Tournaments
Australian Open	A	A	2R	QF	QF	QF	SF	4R	3R	2R	A	2R	2R	A	0 / 10	26–10	72.22%
French Open	A	Q1	3R	2R	SF	4R	SF	4R	2R	A	A	A	1R	A	0 / 8	20–8	71.43%
Wimbledon	A	A	F	4R	A	QF	3R	3R	1R	A	A	3R	1R	A	0 / 8	19–8	70.37%
US Open	A	3R	1R	SF	2R	QF	2R	3R	3R	A	3R	3R	A	A	0 / 10	21–10	67.74%
Win–loss	0–0	2–1	9–4	13–4	10–3	15–4	13–4	10–4	5–4	1–1	2–1	5–3	1–3	0–0	0 / 36	86–36	70.49%
Year-end championships
Tennis Masters Cup	did not qualify			RR	A	W	SF	did not qualify							1 / 3	6–6	50.00%
National representation
Summer Olympics	A	not held			A	not held			3R	not held			1R	NH	0 / 2	2–2	50.00%
Davis Cup	A	A	SF	SF	QF	SF	F	QF	F	A	SF	F	SF	SF^{1}	0 / 8	23–6	79.31%
ATP Masters Series
Indian Wells Masters	A	A	2R	1R	A	4R	4R	4R	QF	4R	2R	A	QF	2R	0 / 10	18–10	64.29%
Miami Masters	1R	1R	1R	3R	A	3R	SF	3R	2R	2R	3R	A	2R	1R	0 / 12	10–12	45.45%
Monte-Carlo Masters	A	A	3R	2R	QF	A	3R	2R	QF	3R	QF	A	A	A	0 / 8	16–8	66.67%
Rome Masters	A	A	2R	1R	F	1R	SF	A	2R	A	A	A	2R	A	0 / 7	11–7	61.11%
Hamburg Masters (Note: Held as Hamburg Masters (outdoor clay) until 2008, Madrid Masters (outdoor clay) 2009 – present.)	A	A	1R	SF	1R	1R	A	A	A	A	A	A	1R	A	0 / 5	4–5	44.44%
Canada Masters	A	A	QF	F	1R	2R	1R	3R	A	A	QF	1R	1R	A	0 / 9	14–9	60.87%
Cincinnati Masters	A	A	1R	QF	A	2R	2R	1R	A	A	3R	2R	1R	A	0 / 8	8–8	50.00%
Madrid Masters (Note: Held as Madrid Masters (indoor hard) from 2002 to 2008, and Shanghai Masters (outdoor hard) 2009 – present.)	not held		3R	A	F	SF	SF	W	3R	A	A	2R	A	A	1 / 7	20–7	74.07%
Paris Masters	A	A	2R	A	A	2R	A	W	F	A	2R	A	A	A	1 / 5	12–4	75.00%
Win–loss	0–1	0–1	9–9	14–7	12–5	8–8	15–7	17–5	13–6	4–3	12–6	2–3	6–6	1–2	2 / 71	113–69	62.09%
Career statistics
Tournaments played	2	9	25	20	14	20	16	18	17	9	11	13	16	5	195		
Finals	0	1	3	2	3	2	1	2	5	1	1	1	1	1	24		
Titles	0	0	2	0	0	2	1	2	2	1	1	0	0	0	11		
Overall win–loss	0–2	17–9	36–24	42–20	34–14	44–19	44–19	31–18	44–16	14–7	28–10	22–12	21–17	6–5	383–192		
Win %	0%	65%	60%	68%	71%	70%	70%	63%	73%	67%	74%	65%	55%	55%	66.61%		
Year-end ranking	248	47	12	8	9	6	8	9	11	65	27	64	81	229			

=== Doubles ===
Tournament	2002	2003	2004	2005	2006	2007	2008	2009	2010	2011	2012	2013	SR	W–L	Win %
Grand Slam Tournaments
Australian Open	A	1R	A	A	A	A	A	A	A	A	A	A	0 / 1	0–1	0%
French Open	A	1R	A	A	A	A	A	A	A	A	A	A	0 / 1	0–1	0%
Wimbledon	A	2R	A	A	1R	A	A	A	A	A	A	A	0 / 2	1–2	33%
US Open	A	A	A	A	A	A	A	A	A	A	A	A	0 / 0	0–0	0%
Win–loss	0–0	1–3	0–0	0–0	0–1	0–0	0–0	0–0	0–0	0–0	0–0	0–0	0 / 4	1–4	20%
National representation
Summer Olympics	not held		A	not held			1R	not held			1R	NH	0 / 2	0–2	0%
Davis Cup	SF	SF	QF	SF	F	QF	F	A	SF	F	SF	SF^{1}	0 / 8	16–5	76%
ATP Masters Series
Indian Wells Masters	A	2R	A	A	1R	1R	2R	QF	A	A	A	A	0 / 5	4–5	44%
Miami Masters	A	1R	A	A	A	A	A	A	A	A	A	A	0 / 1	0–1	0%
Monte-Carlo Masters	A	1R	A	A	A	A	1R	A	A	A	A	A	0 / 2	0–2	0%
Rome Masters	A	A	A	A	A	A	A	A	A	A	A	A	0 / 0	0–0	0%
Hamburg Masters	A	2R	A	A	A	A	A	A	A	A	A	A	0 / 1	1–1	50%
Canada Masters	A	1R	1R	2R	1R	A	A	A	A	A	A	A	0 / 4	1–4	20%
Cincinnati Masters	A	A	A	A	A	A	A	A	A	A	A	A	0 / 0	0–0	0%
Madrid Masters	A	A	A	A	1R	SF	2R	A	A	A	A	A	0 / 3	4–3	57%
Paris Masters	1R	A	A	1R	A	A	2R	A	A	A	A	A	0 / 3	1–3	25%
Win–loss	0–1	2–5	0–1	1–2	0–3	3–2	3–4	3–1	0–0	0–0	0–0	0–0	0 / 19	11–19	38%

Notes:

^{1}Nalbandian played for Argentina at the 2013 Davis Cup, but only signed up to play in doubles rubbers.

== Record against top 10 players ==
Nalbandian's match record against those who have been ranked in the Top 10:

Players who have been ranked world no. 1 are in boldface.

- (Switzerland) **Roger Federer** 8–11
- (France) Richard Gasquet 7–0
- (Russia) Nikolay Davydenko 7–5
- (Sweden) Robin Söderling 6–1
- (Spain) Tommy Robredo 6–3
- (Germany) Rainer Schüttler 6–4
- (United Kingdom) Tim Henman 5–1
- (Chile) Fernando González 5–3
- (Spain) David Ferrer 5–9
- (Croatia) Mario Ančić 4–0
- (France) Arnaud Clément 4–0
- (Czech Republic) Tomáš Berdych 4–1
- (Spain) Nicolás Almagro 4–2
- (Croatia) Marin Čilić 4–2
- (Spain) **Juan Carlos Ferrero** 4–3
- (Spain) **Carlos Moyá** 4–3
- (Croatia) Ivan Ljubičić 4–5
- (Chile) Nicolás Massú 3–1
- (Argentina) Juan Mónaco 3–1
- (Argentina) Juan Martín del Potro 3–1
- (Spain) Félix Mantilla 3–2
- (Australia) **Lleyton Hewitt** 3–3
- (Russia) **Marat Safin** 3–6
- (Switzerland) Stanislas Wawrinka 3–6
- (Sweden) Jonas Björkman 2–0
- (Spain) Albert Costa 2–0
- (Slovakia) Karol Kučera 2–0
- (France) Sébastien Grosjean 2–1
- (United States) John Isner 2–1
- (Australia) Mark Philippoussis 2–1
- (France) Gilles Simon 2–1
- (Thailand) Paradorn Srichaphan 2–1
- (Czech Republic) Radek Štěpánek 2–1
- (Argentina) Guillermo Cañas 2–2
- (Argentina) Guillermo Coria 2–2
- (Sweden) Thomas Johansson 2–2
- (Russia) Mikhail Youzhny 2–2
- (Cyprus) Marcos Baghdatis 2–3
- (Serbia) Janko Tipsarević 2–3
- (United States) **Andy Roddick** 2–4
- (United Kingdom) **Andy Murray** 2–5
- (Spain) **Rafael Nadal** 2–5
- (Brazil) **Gustavo Kuerten** 1–0
- (United States) Todd Martin 1–0
- (Switzerland) Marc Rosset 1–0
- (South Africa) Wayne Ferreira 1–1
- (Germany) Nicolas Kiefer 1–1
- (Austria) Jürgen Melzer 1–1
- (Czech Republic) Jiří Novák 1–1
- (France) Jo-Wilfried Tsonga 1–1
- (France) Gaël Monfils 1–3
- (Serbia) **Novak Djokovic** 1–4
- (United States) **Andre Agassi** 0–1
- (Argentina) Gastón Gaudio 0–1
- (United States) James Blake 0–2
- (United States) Mardy Fish 0–2
- (Russia) **Yevgeny Kafelnikov** 0–2
- (Spain) Fernando Verdasco 0–3
- (Germany) Tommy Haas 0–5

*As of April 1, 2013.

=== Wins over top 10 players per season ===
Season	2000	2001	2002	2003	2004	2005	2006	2007	2008	2009	2010	2011	2012	2013	**Total**
Wins	0	0	4	6	0	6	4	6	5	0	2	0	2	0	**35**

#	Player	Rank	Event	Surface	Rd	Score
**2002**
1.	(Spain) Juan Carlos Ferrero	3	Estoril, Portugal	Clay	2R	4–6, 6–4, 7–6^{(7–4)}
2.	(United Kingdom) Tim Henman	4	Toronto, Canada	Hard	3R	4–6, 7–6^{(9–7)}, 7–5
3.	(United Kingdom) Tim Henman	6	Basel, Switzerland	Carpet (i)	QF	3–6, 7–6^{(7–5)}, 6–2
4.	(Switzerland) Roger Federer	8	Basel, Switzerland	Carpet (i)	SF	6–7^{(2–7)}, 7–5, 6–3
**2003**
5.	(Switzerland) Roger Federer	6	Australian Open, Melbourne, Australia	Hard	4R	6–4, 3–6, 6–1, 1–6, 6–3
6.	(Germany) Rainer Schüttler	8	Montreal, Canada	Hard	SF	3–6, 6–2, 6–2
7.	(Switzerland) Roger Federer	2	Cincinnati, United States	Hard	2R	7–6^{(7–4)}, 7–6^{(7–5)}
8.	(Switzerland) Roger Federer	2	US Open, New York, United States	Hard	4R	3–6, 7–6^{(7–1)}, 6–4, 6–3
9.	(United States) Andy Roddick	2	Basel, Switzerland	Carpet (i)	SF	7–5, 7–5
10.	(Spain) Juan Carlos Ferrero	2	Tennis Masters Cup, Houston, United States	Hard	RR	6–3, 6–1
**2005**
11.	(Argentina) Guillermo Coria	6	Australian Open, Melbourne, Australia	Hard	4R	5–7, 7–5, 6–3, 6–0
12.	(Australia) Lleyton Hewitt	2	Davis Cup, Sydney, Australia	Grass	RR	6–2, 6–4, 6–4
13.	(Argentina) Guillermo Coria	6	Tennis Masters Cup, Shanghai, China	Carpet (i)	RR	7–5, 6–4
14.	(Croatia) Ivan Ljubičić	8	Tennis Masters Cup, Shanghai, China	Carpet (i)	RR	6–2, 6–2
15.	(Russia) Nikolay Davydenko	7	Tennis Masters Cup, Shanghai, China	Carpet (i)	SF	6–0, 7–5
16.	(Switzerland) Roger Federer	1	Tennis Masters Cup, Shanghai, China	Carpet (i)	F	6–7^{(4–7)}, 6–7^{(11–13)}, 6–2, 6–1, 7–6^{(7–3)}
**2006**
17.	(Russia) Nikolay Davydenko	6	Estoril, Portugal	Clay	F	6–3, 6–4
18.	(Russia) Nikolay Davydenko	6	French Open, Paris, France	Clay	QF	6–3, 6–3, 2–6, 6–4
19.	(United States) Andy Roddick	5	Tennis Masters Cup, Shanghai, China	Hard (i)	RR	6–2, 7–6^{(7–4)}
20.	(Russia) Nikolay Davydenko	3	Davis Cup, Moscow, Russia	Carpet (i)	RR	6–2, 6–2, 4–6, 6–4
**2007**
21.	(Spain) Rafael Nadal	2	Madrid, Spain	Hard (i)	QF	6–1, 6–2
22.	(Serbia) Novak Djokovic	3	Madrid, Spain	Hard (i)	SF	6–4, 7–6^{(7–4)}
23.	(Switzerland) Roger Federer	1	Madrid, Spain	Hard (i)	F	1–6, 6–3, 6–3
24.	(Switzerland) Roger Federer	1	Paris, France	Hard (i)	3R	6–3, 7–6^{(7–3)}
25.	(Spain) David Ferrer	6	Paris, France	Hard (i)	QF	7–6^{(7–3)}, 6–7^{(3–7)}, 6–2
26.	(Spain) Rafael Nadal	2	Paris, France	Hard (i)	F	6–4, 6–0
**2008**
27.	(France) Richard Gasquet	10	Queen's Club, England	Grass	QF	6–4, 3–6, 7–6^{(7–3)}
28.	(Argentina) Juan Martín del Potro	9	Basel, Switzerland	Hard (i)	SF	6–4, 6–4
29.	(Argentina) Juan Martín del Potro	9	Paris, France	Hard (i)	3R	6–4, 6–0
30.	(United Kingdom) Andy Murray	4	Paris, France	Hard (i)	QF	7–6^{(7–3)}, 6–3
31.	(Russia) Nikolay Davydenko	3	Paris, France	Hard (i)	SF	6–1, 5–7, 6–4
**2010**
32.	(Russia) Nikolay Davydenko	6	Davis Cup, Moscow, Russia	Hard (i)	RR	6–4, 7–6^{(7–5)}, 7–6^{(8–6)}
33.	(Sweden) Robin Söderling	5	Toronto, Canada	Hard	3R	4–6, 6–4, 6–1
**2012**
34.	(Serbia) Janko Tipsarević	10	Indian Wells, United States	Hard	3R	6–3, 3–6, 6–3
35.	(France) Jo-Wilfried Tsonga	6	Indian Wells, United States	Hard	4R	3–6, 7–5, 6–3
