= 2007 If Stockholm Open – Doubles =

Doubles
- 2007 If Stockholm Open

Final
- Champions: (Sweden) Jonas Björkman (Belarus) Max Mirnyi
- Runners-up: (France) Arnaud Clément (France) Michaël Llodra
- Score: 6–4, 6–4

Events
Singles	Doubles
← 2006 ·	If Stockholm Open	· 2008 →

Paul Hanley and Kevin Ullyett were the defending champions, but lost in the semifinals to Arnaud Clément and Michaël Llodra.

Jonas Björkman and Max Mirnyi won in the final 6–4, 6–4, against Arnaud Clément and Michaël Llodra.

== Seeds ==
1. (Australia) Paul Hanley / (Zimbabwe) Kevin Ullyett (semifinals)
2. (Sweden) Jonas Björkman / (Belarus) Max Mirnyi (champions)
3. (France) Arnaud Clément / (France) Michaël Llodra (final)
4. (South Africa) Jeff Coetzee / (Netherlands) Rogier Wassen (quarterfinals)

== Draw ==
=== Key ===
- Q = Qualifier
- WC = Wild card
- LL = Lucky loser
- Alt = Alternate
- SE = Special exempt
- PR = Protected ranking
- ITF = ITF entry
- JE = Junior exempt
- w/o = Walkover
- r = Retired
- d = Defaulted
- SR = Special ranking

=== Draw ===
First round
1	(Australia) P Hanley (Zimbabwe) K Ullyett	6	6
(Argentina) JM del Potro (Argentina) J Mónaco	3	4
WC	(Sweden) J Brunström (Sweden) M Ryderstedt	6	3	[13]
(Australia) A Fisher (United States) J Thomas	4	6	[11]
3	(France) A Clément (France) M Llodra	3	6	[11]
(United States) E Butorac (Brazil) A Sá	6	3	[9]
WC	(Finland) J Paukku (Sweden) F Prpic	0	6	[10]
(United States) S Lipsky (United States) D Martin	6	2	[8]
(India) R Bopanna (Belgium) O Rochus	6	6^{4}	[10]
(Sweden) T Johansson (Australia) T Perry	2	7^{7}	[8]
(Sweden) R Lindstedt (Finland) J Nieminen	6	4	[5]
4	(South Africa) J Coetzee (Netherlands) R Wassen	3	6	[10]
(Spain) Ó Hernández (Australia) P Luczak	6	7^{7}
(Spain) Montañés (Spain) R Ramírez Hidalgo	2	6^{3}
(Germany) B Becker (South Africa) C Haggard	1	6^{4}
2	(Sweden) J Björkman (Belarus) M Mirnyi	6	7^{7}

Quarterfinals
1	(Australia) P Hanley (Zimbabwe) K Ullyett	7	6
WC	(Sweden) J Brunström (Sweden) M Ryderstedt	5	1
3	(France) A Clément (France) M Llodra	6	6
WC	(Finland) J Paukku (Sweden) F Prpic	1	0
(India) R Bopanna (Belgium) O Rochus	6	6
4	(South Africa) J Coetzee (Netherlands) R Wassen	2	3
(Spain) Ó Hernández (Australia) P Luczak	3	4
2	(Sweden) J Björkman (Belarus) M Mirnyi	6	6

Semifinals
1	(Australia) P Hanley (Zimbabwe) K Ullyett	3	3
3	(France) A Clément (France) M Llodra	6	6
(India) R Bopanna (Belgium) O Rochus	3	5
2	(Sweden) J Björkman (Belarus) M Mirnyi	6	7

Final
3	(France) A Clément (France) M Llodra	4	4
2	(Sweden) J Björkman (Belarus) M Mirnyi	6	6
