= 2006 BMW Open – Singles =

Singles
- 2006 BMW Open

Final
- Champion: (Belgium) Olivier Rochus
- Runner-up: (Belgium) Kristof Vliegen
- Score: 6–4, 6–2

Details
- Draw: 32 (4 Q / 3 WC )
- Seeds: 8

Events
Singles	Doubles
← 2005 ·	BMW Open	· 2007 →

David Nalbandian was the defending champion but did not participate this year.

Olivier Rochus won the title, defeating Kristof Vliegen 6–4, 6–2 in the all-Belgian final.

== Seeds ==
1. (Argentina) Guillermo Coria (first round)
2. (Croatia) Mario Ančić (first round)
3. (Finland) Jarkko Nieminen (semifinals)
4. (Germany) Tommy Haas (first round)
5. (Belgium) Olivier Rochus (champion)
6. (Thailand) Paradorn Srichaphan (first round)
7. (Russia) Mikhail Youzhny (first round)
8. (France) Florent Serra (first round)

== Draw ==
=== Key ===
- Q = Qualifier
- WC = Wild card
- LL = Lucky loser
- Alt = Alternate
- ITF = ITF entry
- PR = Protected ranking
- SR = Special ranking
- SE = Special exempt
- JE = Junior exempt
- JR = Junior Accelerator Programme entrant
- CO = College Accelerator Programme entrant
- NG = Next Gen Accelerator Program entrant
- w/o = Walkover
- r = Retired
- d = Defaulted

=== Finals ===
Semifinals
5	(Belgium) Olivier Rochus	6	6^{1}	6
(Austria) Jürgen Melzer	4	7^{7}	3
3	(Finland) Jarkko Nieminen	1	2
(Belgium) Kristof Vliegen	6	6

Final
5	(Belgium) Olivier Rochus	6	6
(Belgium) Kristof Vliegen	4	2

=== Top half ===
First round
1	(Argentina) G Coria	6	2	3
Q	(Germany) D Gremelmayr	3	6	6
Q	(Austria) A Peya	6	6
Q	(Germany) D Kindlmann	3	4
Q	(Germany) T Summerer	1	2
(Spain) R Ramírez Hidalgo	6	6
LL	(Brazil) J Silva	2	0
5	(Belgium) O Rochus	6	6
4	(Germany) T Haas	3	6^{3}
(Croatia) I Karlović	6	7^{7}
LL	(Germany) T Behrend	2^{r}
(Germany) B Phau	3
WC	(Germany) S Greul	6	6^{0}	7^{10}
(Serbia and Montenegro) B Pašanski	3	7^{7}	6^{8}
(Austria) J Melzer	6	6
7	(Russia) M Youzhny	3	4

Second round
Q	(Germany) D Gremelmayr	6	6
Q	(Austria) A Peya	4	4
(Spain) R Ramírez Hidalgo	2	6^{6}
5	(Belgium) O Rochus	6	7^{8}
(Croatia) I Karlović	4	6	7^{10}
(Germany) B Phau	6	3	6^{8}
WC	(Germany) S Greul	3	6	4
(Austria) J Melzer	6	1	6

Quarterfinals
Q	(Germany) D Gremelmayr	4	5
5	(Belgium) O Rochus	6	7
(Croatia) I Karlović	6^{4}	1
(Austria) J Melzer	7^{7}	6

Semifinals
5	(Belgium) O Rochus	6	6^{1}	6
(Austria) J Melzer	4	7^{7}	3

=== Bottom half ===
First round
6	(Thailand) P Srichaphan	4	4
(Argentina) J Mónaco	6	6
(Czech Republic) R Vik	7^{7}	4	6
(Germany) R Schüttler	6^{5}	6	3
WC	(Germany) A Waske	7^{7}	6
(Germany) F Mayer	6^{4}	3
(Romania) A Pavel	6^{3}	6^{7}
3	(Finland) J Nieminen	7^{7}	7^{9}
8	(France) F Serra	7^{8}	5	4
(Sweden) R Söderling	6^{6}	7	6
(Serbia and Montenegro) J Tipsarević	7	2	4
(Belgium) K Vliegen	5	6	6
WC	(Germany) A Beck	6^{3}	6	4
(Czech Republic) J Hernych	7^{7}	4	6
(Germany) P Kohlschreiber	7^{7}	7^{7}
2	(Croatia) M Ančić	6^{3}	6^{5}

Second round
(Argentina) J Mónaco	6^{3}	6	4
(Czech Republic) R Vik	7^{7}	4	6
WC	(Germany) A Waske	6^{2}	3
3	(Finland) J Nieminen	7^{7}	6
(Sweden) R Söderling	7	3	2
(Belgium) K Vliegen	5	6	6
(Czech Republic) J Hernych	6	0	5
(Germany) P Kohlschreiber	3	6	7

Quarterfinals
(Czech Republic) R Vik	5	6	2
3	(Finland) J Nieminen	7	2	6
(Belgium) K Vliegen	7	6
(Germany) P Kohlschreiber	5	4

Semifinals
3	(Finland) J Nieminen	1	2
(Belgium) K Vliegen	6	6
