= 2003 BMW Open – Singles =

Singles
- 2003 BMW Open

Final
- Champion: (Switzerland) Roger Federer
- Runner-up: (Finland) Jarkko Nieminen
- Score: 6–1, 6–4

Details
- Draw: 32 (4 Q / 3 WC )
- Seeds: 8

Events
Singles	Doubles
- BMW Open

Younes El Aynaoui was the defending champion but did not compete that year.

Roger Federer won in the final 6–1, 6–4 against Jarkko Nieminen. He did not lose a single set in the entire tournament.

== Seeds ==
1. (Switzerland) Roger Federer (champion)
2. (Thailand) Paradorn Srichaphan (second round)
3. (Netherlands) Sjeng Schalken (quarterfinals)
4. (Germany) Rainer Schüttler (quarterfinals)
5. (Russia) Yevgeny Kafelnikov (semifinals, retired because of a neck injury)
6. (Russia) Mikhail Youzhny (quarterfinals)
7. (United Kingdom) Tim Henman (second round)
8. (Finland) Jarkko Nieminen (final)

== Draw ==
Key

- Q = Qualifier
- WC = Wild card
- LL = Lucky loser
- Alt = Alternate
- ITF = ITF entry
- PR = Protected ranking
- SR = Special ranking
- SE = Special exempt
- JE = Junior exempt
- JR = Junior Accelerator Programme entrant
- CO = College Accelerator Programme entrant
- NG = Next Gen Accelerator Program entrant
- w/o = Walkover
- r = Retired
- d = Defaulted

=== Finals ===
Semifinals
1	(Switzerland) Roger Federer	6	6
(Austria) Stefan Koubek	2	1
5	(Russia) Yevgeny Kafelnikov	4	1^{r}
8	(Finland) Jarkko Nieminen	6	0

Final
1	(Switzerland) Roger Federer	6	6
8	(Finland) Jarkko Nieminen	1	4

=== Top half ===
First round
1	(Switzerland) R Federer	6	6
(Croatia) Ž Krajan	4	3
(Netherlands) R Sluiter	7	6
Q	(Italy) R Furlan	5	4
Q	(Israel) H Levy	6	6
(Denmark) K Carlsen	3	1
Q	(Norway) J F Andersen	6	5	3
6	(Russia) M Youzhny	4	7	6
4	(Germany) R Schüttler	6	6
(Austria) J Melzer	4	3
(Russia) N Davydenko	7	6
(United States) C Mamiit	5	1
(Austria) S Koubek	7	6
WC	(Germany) B Phau	5	4
(Ecuador) N Lapentti	5	6	1
WC/7	(United Kingdom) T Henman	7	4	6

Second round
1	(Switzerland) R Federer	6	6
(Netherlands) R Sluiter	4	3
Q	(Israel) H Levy	6	4	1
6	(Russia) M Youzhny	3	6	6
4	(Germany) R Schüttler	4	6	6
(Russia) N Davydenko	6	2	3
(Austria) S Koubek	6	6
WC/7	(United Kingdom) T Henman	4	0

Quarterfinals
1	(Switzerland) R Federer	6	6
6	(Russia) M Youzhny	2	3
4	(Germany) R Schüttler	3	4
(Austria) S Koubek	6	6

Semifinals
1	(Switzerland) R Federer	6	6
(Austria) S Koubek	2	1

=== Bottom half ===
First round
5	(Russia) Y Kafelnikov	6	6
(Belgium) O Rochus	3	2
(Romania) A Voinea	5	6^{2}
(Germany) A Waske	7	7^{7}
(Germany) T Behrend	6^{4}	5
(Australia) W Arthurs	7^{7}	7
(Germany) L Burgsmüller	3	1
3	(Netherlands) S Schalken	6	6
8	(Finland) J Nieminen	6	6
(Georgia (country)) I Labadze	2	3
(Monaco) J-R Lisnard	6	6
Q	(Netherlands) M Verkerk	2	4
(France) O Mutis	3	2
(Czech Republic) R Štěpánek	6	6
WC	(Germany) M Kohlmann	4	1
2	(Thailand) P Srichaphan	6	6

Second round
5	(Russia) Y Kafelnikov	7	4	6
(Germany) A Waske	5	6	3
(Australia) W Arthurs	6^{4}	3
3	(Netherlands) S Schalken	7^{7}	6
8	(Finland) J Nieminen	6	6
(Monaco) J-R Lisnard	3	0
(Czech Republic) R Štěpánek	6	6
2	(Thailand) P Srichaphan	3	2

Quarterfinals
5	(Russia) Y Kafelnikov	6^{2}	7	6
3	(Netherlands) S Schalken	7^{7}	5	3
8	(Finland) J Nieminen	6	6
(Czech Republic) R Štěpánek	1	1

Semifinals
5	(Russia) Y Kafelnikov	4	1^{r}
8	(Finland) J Nieminen	6	0
