= 2010 If Stockholm Open – Singles =

Singles
- 2010 If Stockholm Open

Final
- Champion: (Switzerland) Roger Federer
- Runner-up: (Germany) Florian Mayer
- Score: 6–4, 6–3

Details
- Draw: 28
- Seeds: 8

Events
Singles	Doubles
- If Stockholm Open

Marcos Baghdatis was the defending champion, but chose to participate in the Kremlin Cup instead.
Roger Federer won this event, by defeating Florian Mayer 6–4, 6–3 in the final.

== Seeds ==
The top four seeds received a bye into the second round.

1. (Switzerland) Roger Federer (champion)
2. (Sweden) Robin Söderling (quarterfinals)
3. (Czech Republic) Tomáš Berdych (second round)
4. (Croatia) Ivan Ljubičić (semifinals)
5. (Switzerland) Stanislas Wawrinka (quarterfinals)
6. (Spain) Feliciano López (first round)
7. (Brazil) Thomaz Bellucci (first round)
8. (Spain) Tommy Robredo (first round)

== Draw ==
Key

- Q = Qualifier
- WC = Wild card
- LL = Lucky loser
- Alt = Alternate
- ITF = ITF entry
- PR = Protected ranking
- SR = Special ranking
- SE = Special exempt
- JE = Junior exempt
- JR = Junior Accelerator Programme entrant
- CO = College Accelerator Programme entrant
- NG = Next Gen Accelerator Program entrant
- w/o = Walkover
- r = Retired
- d = Defaulted

=== Finals ===
Semifinals
1	(Switzerland) Roger Federer	7^{7}	6
4	(Croatia) Ivan Ljubičić	6^{5}	2
(Finland) Jarkko Nieminen	6	4	6^{3}
(Germany) Florian Mayer	4	6	7^{7}

Final
1	(Switzerland) Roger Federer	6	6
(Germany) Florian Mayer	4	3

=== Top half ===
First round
(United States) T Dent	6
(Poland) M Przysiężny	2	r
Q	(Sweden) F Prpic	6^{4}	6	4
(Netherlands) R Haase	7^{7}	3	6
(Italy) A Seppi	2	2
5/WC	(Switzerland) S Wawrinka	6	6
(Belgium) O Rochus	0	4
(France) A Clément	6	6
(Germany) T Kamke	6	6
(Czech Republic) J Hájek	0	2
Q	(Croatia) I Dodig	6	6
8	(Spain) T Robredo	3	2

Second round
1	(Switzerland) R Federer	6	6
(United States) T Dent	1	2
(Netherlands) R Haase	5	7^{8}	4
5/WC	(Switzerland) S Wawrinka	7	6^{6}	6
4	(Croatia) I Ljubičić	6	6
(France) A Clément	3	4
(Germany) T Kamke	1	1
Q	(Croatia) I Dodig	6	6

Quarterfinals
1	(Switzerland) R Federer	2	6	6
5/WC	(Switzerland) S Wawrinka	6	3	2
4	(Croatia) I Ljubičić	4	6	6
Q	(Croatia) I Dodig	6	2	4

Semifinals
1	(Switzerland) R Federer	7^{7}	6
4	(Croatia) I Ljubičić	6^{5}	2

=== Bottom half ===
First round
7	(Brazil) T Bellucci	6	4	4
WC	(United States) J Blake	3	6	6
(Poland) Ł Kubot	4	6	3
Q	(Germany) M Bachinger	6	4	6
(Finland) J Nieminen	4	6	6
(Germany) M Berrer	6	1	4
6	(Spain) F López	2	2
(Germany) F Mayer	6	6
WC	(Sweden) M Ryderstedt	7^{7}	6
(Spain) D Gimeno-Traver	6^{3}	3
Q	(Netherlands) T Schoorel	3	0
(Germany) B Becker	6	6

Second round
WC	(United States) J Blake	6	3	7^{7}
Q	(Germany) M Bachinger	4	6	6^{2}
(Finland) J Nieminen	6	6
3	(Czech Republic) T Berdych	1	4
(Germany) F Mayer	6	6
WC	(Sweden) M Ryderstedt	4	4
(Germany) B Becker	3	3
2	(Sweden) R Söderling	6	6

Quarterfinals
WC	(United States) J Blake	0	2
(Finland) J Nieminen	6	6
(Germany) F Mayer	7^{10}	6
2	(Sweden) R Söderling	6^{8}	1

Semifinals
(Finland) J Nieminen	6	4	6^{3}
(Germany) F Mayer	4	6	7^{7}
