= 2007 If Stockholm Open =

- Date: 8–14 October
- Edition: 39th
- Category: International Series
- Draw: 32S / 16D
- Prize money: $775,000
- Surface: Hard / indoor
- Location: Stockholm, Sweden
- Venue: Kungliga tennishallen

Champions

Singles
- (Croatia) Ivo Karlović

Doubles
- (Sweden) Jonas Björkman / (Belarus) Max Mirnyi
← 2006 ·	Stockholm Open	· 2008 →

The 2007 If Stockholm Open was a men's tennis tournament played on indoor hard courts. It was the 39th edition of the event known that year as the If Stockholm Open, and was part of the International Series of the 2007 ATP Tour. It took place at the Kungliga tennishallen in Stockholm, Sweden, from 8 October until 14 October 2007. Seventh-seeded Ivo Karlović won the singles title.

The announced draw featured ATP No. 7, Cincinnati Masters runner-up, Sydney and New Haven winner, and two-time Stockholm defending champion James Blake, US Open semifinalist, Auckland, Båstad and Tokyo titlist David Ferrer, and Sopot and Metz champion Tommy Robredo. Also lined up were Memphis titlist Tommy Haas, Buenos Aires, Pörtschach and Kitzbühel champion Juan Mónaco, Jarkko Nieminen, Ivo Karlović and Fernando Verdasco.

== Finals ==
=== Singles ===
(Croatia) Ivo Karlović defeated (Sweden) Thomas Johansson, 6–3, 3–6, 6–1

- It was Karlović's 3rd singles title of the year and of his career.

=== Doubles ===
(Sweden) Jonas Björkman / (Belarus) Max Mirnyi defeated (France) Arnaud Clément / (France) Michaël Llodra, 6–4, 6–4
