= 2007 If Stockholm Open – Singles =

Singles
- 2007 If Stockholm Open

Final
- Champion: (Croatia) Ivo Karlović
- Runner-up: (Sweden) Thomas Johansson
- Score: 6–3, 3–6, 6–1

Details
- Draw: 32
- Seeds: 8

Events
Singles	Doubles
- If Stockholm Open

James Blake was the defending champion, but lost in the semifinals to Thomas Johansson.

Ivo Karlović won in the final 6–3, 3–6, 6–1, against Thomas Johansson.

== Seeds ==
1. (United States) James Blake (semifinals)
2. (Spain) David Ferrer (withdrew due to a hamstring injury)
3. (Spain) Tommy Robredo (withdrew due to personal reasons)
4. (Germany) Tommy Haas (semifinals)
5. (Argentina) Juan Mónaco (quarterfinals)
6. (Finland) Jarkko Nieminen (quarterfinals)
7. (Croatia) Ivo Karlović (champion)
8. (Spain) Fernando Verdasco (withdrew due to a calf injury)

== Draw ==
Key

- Q = Qualifier
- WC = Wild card
- LL = Lucky loser
- Alt = Alternate
- ITF = ITF entry
- PR = Protected ranking
- SR = Special ranking
- SE = Special exempt
- JE = Junior exempt
- JR = Junior Accelerator Programme entrant
- CO = College Accelerator Programme entrant
- NG = Next Gen Accelerator Program entrant
- w/o = Walkover
- r = Retired
- d = Defaulted

=== Finals ===
Semifinals
1	(United States) James Blake	6	1	6^{3}
(Sweden) Thomas Johansson	3	6	7^{7}
4	(Germany) Tommy Haas	4	3
7	(Croatia) Ivo Karlović	6	6

Final
(Sweden) Thomas Johansson	3	6	1
7	(Croatia) Ivo Karlović	6	3	6

=== Top half ===
First round
1	(United States) J Blake	6^{3}	7	6
(Sweden) J Björkman	7^{7}	5	3
Q	(Netherlands) P Wessels	1	7^{9}	6^{6}
(Canada) F Dancevic	6	6^{7}	7^{8}
(Australia) P Luczak	2	6	6
(Germany) B Becker	6	3	4
Q	(Germany) T Kamke	1	2
6	(Finland) J Nieminen	6	6
Q	(Germany) D Gremelmayr	3	2
(France) M Llodra	6	6
(Argentina) JM del Potro	4	0^{r}
(Sweden) T Johansson	6	1
(United States) A Delic	1	4
(Croatia) M Ančić	6	6
(United States) V Spadea	4	4
LL	(Sweden) B Rehnquist	6	6

Second round
1	(United States) J Blake	6	6
(Canada) F Dancevic	3	2
(Australia) P Luczak	0	4
6	(Finland) J Nieminen	6	6
(France) M Llodra	4	6^{10}
(Sweden) T Johansson	6	7^{12}
(Croatia) M Ančić	6	6
LL	(Sweden) B Rehnquist	1	3

Quarterfinals
1	(United States) J Blake	6^{1}	6	6
6	(Finland) J Nieminen	7^{7}	4	2
(Sweden) T Johansson	4	7	7^{7}
(Croatia) M Ančić	6	5	6^{3}

Semifinals
1	(United States) J Blake	6	1	6^{3}
(Sweden) T Johansson	3	6	7^{7}

=== Bottom half ===
First round
5	(Argentina) J Mónaco	6	6
WC	(Sweden) E Eleskovic	3	3
Q	(Sweden) F Prpic	6	7^{7}
(Spain) Ó Hernández	2	6^{4}
LL	(India) R Bopanna	6^{5}	1
(Spain) Montañés	7^{7}	6
(Belgium) O Rochus	4	1
4	(Germany) T Haas	6	6
7	(Croatia) I Karlović	7^{8}	6^{4}	6
(Chile) N Massú	6^{6}	7^{7}	4
(Argentina) C Berlocq	6^{1}	2
WC	(Sweden) J Johansson	7^{7}	6
(France) A Clément	6	6
LL	(Belarus) M Mirnyi	3	2
WC	(Sweden) M Ryderstedt	6	7^{7}
LL	(Denmark) K Carlsen	3	6^{4}

Second round
5	(Argentina) J Mónaco	6	6
Q	(Sweden) F Prpic	4	4
(Spain) Montañés	2	6	3
4	(Germany) T Haas	6	3	6
7	(Croatia) I Karlović	w/o
WC	(Sweden) J Johansson
(France) A Clément	7^{7}	3	6
WC	(Sweden) M Ryderstedt	6^{2}	6	3

Quarterfinals
5	(Argentina) J Mónaco	3	3
4	(Germany) T Haas	6	6
7	(Croatia) I Karlović	7^{7}	3	7^{9}
(France) A Clément	6^{1}	6	6^{7}

Semifinals
4	(Germany) T Haas	4	3
7	(Croatia) I Karlović	6	6
