= 2005 BMW Open =

Tennis tournament

- Date: 25 April – 2 May
- Edition: 90th
- Category: International Series
- Draw: 32S / 16D
- Prize money: $355,000
- Surface: Clay
- Location: Munich, Germany

Champions

Singles
- (Argentina) David Nalbandian

Doubles
- (Croatia) Mario Ančić / (Austria) Julian Knowle
← 2004 ·	BMW Open	· 2006 →

The 2005 BMW Open was a men's Association of Tennis Professionals tennis tournament held in Munich, Germany. It was part of the 2005 ATP Tour and was classified as an International Series event. The tournament was played on outdoor clay courts and held from 25 April through 2 May 2005. First-seeded David Nalbandian won the singles title.

== Finals ==
=== Singles ===
(Argentina) David Nalbandian defeated (Romania) Andrei Pavel 6–4, 6–1

- It was Nalbandian's 1st title of the year and the 3rd of his career.

=== Doubles ===
(Croatia) Mario Ančić / (Austria) Julian Knowle defeated (Germany) Florian Mayer / (Germany) Alexander Waske 6–3, 1–6, 6–3

- It was Ančić's 1st title of the year and the 2nd of his career. It was Knowle's 1st title of the year and the 5th of his career.
