= 2004 BMW Open – Doubles =

Doubles
- 2004 BMW Open

Final
- Champions: (United States) James Blake (The Bahamas) Mark Merklein
- Runners-up: (Austria) Julian Knowle (Serbia and Montenegro) Nenad Zimonjić
- Score: 6–2, 6–4

Events
Singles	Doubles
← 2003 ·	BMW Open	· 2005 →

Wayne Black and Kevin Ullyett were the defending champions but did not compete that year.

James Blake and Mark Merklein won in the final 6–2, 6–4 against Julian Knowle and Nenad Zimonjić.

== Seeds ==
1. (United States) Jared Palmer / (Czech Republic) Pavel Vízner (semifinals)
2. (Austria) Julian Knowle / (Serbia and Montenegro) Nenad Zimonjić (final)
3. (Poland) Mariusz Fyrstenberg / (Poland) Marcin Matkowski (first round)
4. (Czech Republic) Petr Pála / (Czech Republic) Radek Štěpánek (first round)

== Draw ==
=== Key ===
- Q = Qualifier
- WC = Wild card
- LL = Lucky loser
- Alt = Alternate
- SE = Special exempt
- PR = Protected ranking
- ITF = ITF entry
- JE = Junior exempt
- w/o = Walkover
- r = Retired
- d = Defaulted
- SR = Special ranking

First round
1	(United States) J Palmer (Czech Republic) P Vízner	7^{7}	6
(Australia) J Kerr (Belgium) T Vanhoudt	6^{4}	4
(Thailand) P Srichaphan (Netherlands) M Verkerk	7^{7}	6
ALT	(Spain) E Benfele Álvarez (South Africa) W Moodie	6^{5}	4
4	(Czech Republic) P Pála (Czech Republic) R Štěpánek	3	3
(United States) J Blake (The Bahamas) M Merklein	6	6
(Germany) K Braasch (Armenia) S Sargsian	6	7^{7}
WC	(Belarus) V Voltchkov (Germany) A Waske	3	6^{3}
(Sweden) J Johansson (Australia) T Perry	2	6	6
(United States) V Spadea (Russia) M Youzhny	6	3	4
WC	(Germany) L Burgsmüller (Chinese Taipei) Y-H Lu	6	6
3	(Poland) M Fyrstenberg (Poland) M Matkowski	3	1
(Czech Republic) T Cibulec (Czech Republic) D Škoch	7	6
(Romania) V Hănescu (Romania) A Pavel	5	2
(Switzerland) Y Allegro (Germany) M Kohlmann	2	6	6^{1}
2	(Austria) J Knowle (Serbia and Montenegro) N Zimonjić	6	3	7^{7}

Quarterfinals
1	(United States) J Palmer (Czech Republic) P Vízner	6	6
(Thailand) P Srichaphan (Netherlands) M Verkerk	4	2
(United States) J Blake (The Bahamas) M Merklein	w/o
(Germany) K Braasch (Armenia) S Sargsian
(Sweden) J Johansson (Australia) T Perry	6	6
WC	(Germany) L Burgsmüller (Chinese Taipei) Y-H Lu	3	4
(Czech Republic) T Cibulec (Czech Republic) D Škoch	1	4
2	(Austria) J Knowle (Serbia and Montenegro) N Zimonjić	6	6

Semifinals
1	(United States) J Palmer (Czech Republic) P Vízner	3	6	2
(United States) J Blake (The Bahamas) M Merklein	6	1	6
(Sweden) J Johansson (Australia) T Perry	6^{5}	1
2	(Austria) J Knowle (Serbia and Montenegro) N Zimonjić	7^{7}	6

Final
(United States) J Blake (The Bahamas) M Merklein	6	6
2	(Austria) J Knowle (Serbia and Montenegro) N Zimonjić	2	4
