= 2004 BMW Open =

- Date: 26 April – 2 May
- Edition: 89th
- Category: International Series
- Draw: 32S / 16D
- Prize money: $355,000
- Surface: Clay / outdoor
- Location: Munich, Germany
- Venue: MTTC Iphitos

Champions

Singles
- (Russia) Nikolay Davydenko

Doubles
- (United States) James Blake / (The Bahamas) Mark Merklein
← 2003 ·	BMW Open	· 2005 →

The 2004 BMW Open was a men's tennis tournament played on outdoor clay courts in Munich, Germany and was part of the International Series of the 2004 ATP Tour. The tournament ran from 26 April until 2 May 2004. Unseeded Nikolay Davydenko won the singles title.

== Finals ==
=== Singles ===
(Russia) Nikolay Davydenko defeated (Netherlands) Martin Verkerk 6–4, 7–5

- It was Davydenko's 1st title of the year and the 3rd of his career.

=== Doubles ===
(United States) James Blake / (The Bahamas) Mark Merklein defeated (Austria) Julian Knowle / (Serbia and Montenegro) Nenad Zimonjić 6–2, 6–4

- It was Blake's 3rd title of the year and the 6th of his career. It was Merklein's only title of the year and the 4th of his career.
