= 2003 BMW Open – Doubles =

Doubles
- 2003 BMW Open

Final
- Champions: (Zimbabwe) Wayne Black (Zimbabwe) Kevin Ullyett
- Runners-up: (Australia) Joshua Eagle (United States) Jared Palmer
- Score: 6–3, 7–5

Events
Singles	Doubles
← 2002 ·	BMW Open	· 2004 →

The 2003 BMW Open tennis tournament was played in Munich, Germany as part of the International Series of the 2003 ATP Tour. The tournament ran from April 28 through May 4, 2003.

Petr Luxa and Radek Štěpánek were the defending doubles champions, but lost in the first round to Tomáš Cibulec and Pavel Vízner.

Wayne Black and Kevin Ullyett won in the final 6–3, 7–5 against Joshua Eagle and Jared Palmer.

== Seeds ==
1. (Zimbabwe) Wayne Black / (Zimbabwe) Kevin Ullyett (champions)
2. (Australia) Joshua Eagle / (United States) Jared Palmer (final)
3. (Czech Republic) Tomáš Cibulec / (Czech Republic) Pavel Vízner (semifinals)
4. (Russia) Yevgeny Kafelnikov / (Germany) David Prinosil (quarterfinals)

== Draw ==
=== Key ===
- Q = Qualifier
- WC = Wild card
- LL = Lucky loser
- Alt = Alternate
- SE = Special exempt
- PR = Protected ranking
- ITF = ITF entry
- JE = Junior exempt
- w/o = Walkover
- r = Retired
- d = Defaulted
- SR = Special ranking

First round
1	(Zimbabwe) W Black (Zimbabwe) K Ullyett	6	7^{7}
(Australia) W Arthurs (Australia) P Hanley	2	6^{5}
WC	(Germany) J Knippschild (Germany) A Waske	7^{7}	6
(South Africa) C Haggard (South Africa) R Koenig	6^{4}	3
4	(Russia) Y Kafelnikov (Germany) D Prinosil	6	6
WC	(Germany) L Burgsmüller (Israel) H Levy	1	1
(Finland) J Nieminen (Thailand) P Srichaphan	6	4	6
(Germany) K Braasch (Denmark) K Carlsen	4	6	3
(Czech Republic) P Pála (Czech Republic) C Suk	6^{5}	6	6
(Germany) M Kohlmann (Russia) M Youzhny	7^{7}	4	2
(Czech Republic) P Luxa (Czech Republic) R Štěpánek	2	7^{7}	2
3	(Czech Republic) T Cibulec (Czech Republic) P Vízner	6	6^{4}	6
(Netherlands) S Schalken (United States) J Tarango	6^{4}	6	7^{7}
(Netherlands) R Sluiter (Netherlands) M Verkerk	7^{7}	3	6^{4}
(Austria) J Knowle (Croatia) Ž Krajan	6	3	4
2	(Australia) J Eagle (United States) J Palmer	4	6	6

Quarterfinals
1	(Zimbabwe) W Black (Zimbabwe) K Ullyett	6	7
WC	(Germany) J Knippschild (Germany) A Waske	3	5
4	(Russia) Y Kafelnikov (Germany) D Prinosil	1	r
(Finland) J Nieminen (Thailand) P Srichaphan	6
(Czech Republic) P Pála (Czech Republic) C Suk	4	2
3	(Czech Republic) T Cibulec (Czech Republic) P Vízner	6	6
(Netherlands) S Schalken (United States) J Tarango	6^{3}	2
2	(Australia) J Eagle (United States) J Palmer	7^{7}	6

Semifinals
1	(Zimbabwe) W Black (Zimbabwe) K Ullyett	6	6
(Finland) J Nieminen (Thailand) P Srichaphan	4	3
3	(Czech Republic) T Cibulec (Czech Republic) P Vízner	6	3	4
2	(Australia) J Eagle (United States) J Palmer	4	6	6

Final
1	(Zimbabwe) W Black (Zimbabwe) K Ullyett	6	7
2	(Australia) J Eagle (United States) J Palmer	3	5
