= 2005 BMW Open – Doubles =

Doubles
- 2005 BMW Open

Final
- Champions: (Croatia) Mario Ančić (Austria) Julian Knowle
- Runners-up: (Germany) Florian Mayer (Germany) Alexander Waske
- Score: 6–3, 1–6, 6–3

Events
Singles	Doubles
← 2004 ·	BMW Open	· 2006 →

James Blake and Mark Merklein were the defending champions, but did not participate this year.

Mario Ančić and Julian Knowle won in the final 6–3, 1–6, 6–3, against Florian Mayer and Alexander Waske.

== Seeds ==
1. (Czech Republic) Cyril Suk / (Czech Republic) Pavel Vízner (quarterfinals)
2. (Czech Republic) Martin Damm / (Argentina) Mariano Hood (first round)
3. (Israel) Jonathan Erlich / (Israel) Andy Ram (first round)
4. (Switzerland) Yves Allegro / (Germany) Michael Kohlmann (quarterfinals)

== Draw ==
=== Key ===
- Q = Qualifier
- WC = Wild card
- LL = Lucky loser
- Alt = Alternate
- ITF = ITF entry
- PR = Protected ranking
- SR = Special ranking
- SE = Special exempt
- JE = Junior exempt
- JR = Junior Accelerator Programme entrant
- CO = College Accelerator Programme entrant
- NG = Next Gen Accelerator Program entrant
- w/o = Walkover
- r = Retired
- d = Defaulted

=== Draw ===
First round
1	(Czech Republic) C Suk (Czech Republic) P Vízner	4	6	7
(Australia) J Kerr (Argentina) S Prieto	6	4	5
WC	(Romania) A Pavel (Romania) G Trifu	6	4	6
WC	(Germany) L Burgsmüller (Germany) T Summerer	0	6	1
3	(Israel) J Erlich (Israel) A Ram	7^{8}	6^{5}	3
(Croatia) M Ančić (Austria) J Knowle	6^{6}	7^{7}	6
(United States) G Oliver (United States) J Palmer	7^{7}	6
(Russia) I Andreev (Thailand) P Srichaphan	6^{3}	4
(Germany) F Mayer (Germany) A Waske	w/o
(Argentina) J Acasuso (Argentina) J Mónaco
(South Africa) C Haggard (Brazil) R Mello	3	2
4	(Switzerland) Y Allegro (Germany) M Kohlmann	6	6
(Australia) W Arthurs (Australia) P Luczak	7^{7}	6
(South Africa) R Koenig (Italy) U Vico	6^{4}	3
(Finland) J Nieminen (Germany) R Schüttler	7^{7}	3	6
2	(Czech Republic) M Damm (Argentina) M Hood	6^{5}	6	2

Quarterfinals
1	(Czech Republic) C Suk (Czech Republic) P Vízner	1	6	3
WC	(Romania) A Pavel (Romania) G Trifu	6	4	6
(Croatia) M Ančić (Austria) J Knowle	6	1	6
(United States) G Oliver (United States) J Palmer	3	6	2
(Germany) F Mayer (Germany) A Waske	6	1	7
4	(Switzerland) Y Allegro (Germany) M Kohlmann	4	6	5
(Australia) W Arthurs (Australia) P Luczak	6^{4}	4
(Finland) J Nieminen (Germany) R Schüttler	7^{7}	6

Semifinals
WC	(Romania) A Pavel (Romania) G Trifu	5	r
(Croatia) M Ančić (Austria) J Knowle	7
(Germany) F Mayer (Germany) A Waske	6^{11}	7^{7}	7
(Finland) J Nieminen (Germany) R Schüttler	7^{13}	6^{5}	5

Final
(Croatia) M Ančić (Austria) J Knowle	6	1	6
(Germany) F Mayer (Germany) A Waske	3	6	3
