= 2009 If Stockholm Open – Doubles =

Tennis tournament

Doubles
- 2009 If Stockholm Open

Final
- Champions: (Brazil) Bruno Soares (Zimbabwe) Kevin Ullyett
- Runners-up: (Sweden) Simon Aspelin (Australia) Paul Hanley
- Score: 6–4, 7–6^{(7–4)}

Events
Singles	Doubles
← 2008 ·	If Stockholm Open	· 2010 →

Jonas Björkman and Kevin Ullyett were the defending champion, but Björkman was retired in November 2008.
Ullyett partnered up with Bruno Soares, and they won in the final 6–4, 7–6^{(7–4)} against Simon Aspelin and Paul Hanley.

== Seeds ==
1. (Brazil) Bruno Soares / (Zimbabwe) Kevin Ullyett (champions)
2. (Sweden) Simon Aspelin / (Australia) Paul Hanley (final)
3. (Australia) Jordan Kerr / (United States) Travis Parrott (quarterfinals)
4. (South Africa) Jeff Coetzee / (Australia) Stephen Huss (semifinals)

== Draw ==
=== Key ===
- Q = Qualifier
- WC = Wild card
- LL = Lucky loser
- Alt = Alternate
- SE = Special exempt
- PR = Protected ranking
- ITF = ITF entry
- JE = Junior exempt
- w/o = Walkover
- r = Retired
- d = Defaulted
- SR = Special ranking

First round
1	(Brazil) B Soares (Zimbabwe) K Ullyett	7^{7}	6
WC	(Sweden) P Brydolf (Sweden) A Siljeström	6^{1}	3
(Spain) F López (Spain) M López	7	6
(Spain) G García-López (Australia) P Luczak	5	3
4	(South Africa) J Coetzee (Australia) S Huss	2	6	[10]
WC	(Finland) H Kontinen (Finland) J Nieminen	6	3	[6]
(France) A Clément (Sweden) R Lindstedt	6	6
(Sweden) J Brunström (Netherlands Antilles) J-J Rojer	4	4
(Germany) A Beck (Germany) C Kas	6	1	[10]
ALT	(United States) R Kendrick (Argentina) L Mayer	4	6	[8]
(Brazil) M Melo (Brazil) A Sá	2	1
3	(Australia) J Kerr (United States) T Parrott	6	6
(Germany) B Becker (Czech Republic) D Škoch	6	7^{7}
(Argentina) L Arnold Ker (Argentina) J Mónaco	0	6^{3}
(Germany) S Greul (Italy) A Seppi	4	1
2	(Sweden) S Aspelin (Australia) P Hanley	6	6

Quarterfinals
1	(Brazil) B Soares (Zimbabwe) K Ullyett	6	6
(Spain) F López (Spain) M López	2	1
4	(South Africa) J Coetzee (Australia) S Huss	7^{7}	3	[10]
(France) A Clément (Sweden) R Lindstedt	6^{3}	6	[7]
(Germany) A Beck (Germany) C Kas	6	6
3	(Australia) J Kerr (United States) T Parrott	4	2
(Germany) B Becker (Czech Republic) D Škoch	4	3
2	(Sweden) S Aspelin (Australia) P Hanley	6	6

Semifinals
1	(Brazil) B Soares (Zimbabwe) K Ullyett	6	7
4	(South Africa) J Coetzee (Australia) S Huss	4	5
(Germany) A Beck (Germany) C Kas	1	2
2	(Sweden) S Aspelin (Australia) P Hanley	6	6

Final
1	(Brazil) B Soares (Zimbabwe) K Ullyett	6	7^{7}
2	(Sweden) S Aspelin (Australia) P Hanley	4	6^{4}
