= 2003 BMW Open =

- Date: 28 April – 4 May
- Edition: 88th
- Category: International Series
- Draw: 32S / 16D
- Prize money: $355,000
- Surface: Clay / outdoor
- Location: Munich, Germany
- Venue: MTTC Iphitos

Champions

Singles
- (Switzerland) Roger Federer

Doubles
- (Zimbabwe) Wayne Black / (Zimbabwe) Kevin Ullyett
← 2002 ·	BMW Open	· 2004 →

The 2003 BMW Open was a men's tennis tournament played on outdoor clay courts in Munich, Germany and was part of the International Series of the 2003 ATP Tour. The tournament ran from 28 April through 4 May 2003. First-seeded Roger Federer won the singles title.

== Finals ==
=== Singles ===
(Switzerland) Roger Federer defeated (Finland) Jarkko Nieminen 6–1, 6–4

- It was Federer's 3rd title of the year and the 13th of his career.

=== Doubles ===
(Zimbabwe) Wayne Black / (Zimbabwe) Kevin Ullyett defeated (Australia) Joshua Eagle / (United States) Jared Palmer 6–3, 7–5

- It was Black's only title of the year and the 14th of his career. It was Ullyett's only title of the year and the 20th of his career.
