= 2008 If Stockholm Open – Singles =

Singles
- 2008 If Stockholm Open

Final
- Champion: (Argentina) David Nalbandian
- Runner-up: (Sweden) Robin Söderling
- Score: 6–2, 5–7, 6–3

Details
- Draw: 32 (4Q / 3WC)
- Seeds: 8

Events
Singles	Doubles
- If Stockholm Open

Ivo Karlović was the defending champion, but chose not to participate that year.

First-seeded David Nalbandian won in the final 6–2, 5–7, 6–3, against Robin Söderling.

This tournament marked the final main-draw professional appearance of former world No. 7 and 2002 Australian Open champion Thomas Johansson.

== Seeds ==
1. (Argentina) David Nalbandian (champion)
2. (Croatia) Mario Ančić (quarterfinals, withdrew due to a bronchitis and fever)
3. (Finland) Jarkko Nieminen (semifinals)
4. (Sweden) Robin Söderling (final)
5. (Germany) Rainer Schüttler (quarterfinals)
6. (Argentina) José Acasuso (second round)
7. (Spain) Albert Montañés (quarterfinals)
8. (Spain) Marcel Granollers (first round)

== Draw ==
Key

- Q = Qualifier
- WC = Wild card
- LL = Lucky loser
- Alt = Alternate
- ITF = ITF entry
- PR = Protected ranking
- SR = Special ranking
- SE = Special exempt
- JE = Junior exempt
- JR = Junior Accelerator Programme entrant
- CO = College Accelerator Programme entrant
- NG = Next Gen Accelerator Program entrant
- w/o = Walkover
- r = Retired
- d = Defaulted

=== Finals ===
Semifinals
1	(Argentina) David Nalbandian	6	6
3	(Finland) Jarkko Nieminen	2	1
4	(Sweden) Robin Söderling	6	6
WC	(Japan) Kei Nishikori	1	0

Final
1	(Argentina) David Nalbandian	6	5	6
4	(Sweden) Robin Söderling	2	7	3

=== Top half ===
First round
1	(Argentina) D Nalbandian	6	6
(United States) B Reynolds	1	1
WC	(Sweden) J Johansson	7	7^{7}
(France) N Mahut	5	6^{5}
Q	(Switzerland) G Bastl	7^{8}	3	7^{7}
Q	(Denmark) F Nielsen	6^{6}	6	6^{4}
(Sweden) T Johansson	3	6	3
7	(Spain) Montañés	6	4	6
3	(Finland) J Nieminen	6^{5}	6	7
(Brazil) T Bellucci	7^{7}	3	5
(France) A Clément	6	6
Q	(Sweden) B Rehnquist	2	1
(Spain) Ó Hernández	6	6
(Czech Republic) I Minář	4	3
Q	(Germany) M Bachinger	6^{5}	6	6^{4}
6	(Argentina) J Acasuso	7^{7}	3	7^{7}

Second round
1	(Argentina) D Nalbandian	6	6
WC	(Sweden) J Johansson	3	2
Q	(Switzerland) G Bastl	6	3	2
7	(Spain) Montañés	1	6	6
3	(Finland) J Nieminen	6	6^{5}	6
(France) A Clément	4	7^{7}	2
(Spain) Ó Hernández	2	6	6
6	(Argentina) J Acasuso	6	3	4

Quarterfinals
1	(Argentina) D Nalbandian	6	6
7	(Spain) Montañés	4	1
3	(Finland) J Nieminen	6	6
(Spain) Ó Hernández	1	4

Semifinals
1	(Argentina) D Nalbandian	6	6
3	(Finland) J Nieminen	2	1

=== Bottom half ===
First round
5	(Germany) R Schüttler	6	6
(Australia) C Guccione	0	3
(Spain) I Navarro	6	6^{7}	5
(Ecuador) N Lapentti	3	7^{9}	7
LL	(Argentina) J Mónaco	6	6
WC	(Sweden) J Björkman	2	4
(Germany) B Becker	5	3
4	(Sweden) R Söderling	7	6
8	(Spain) M Granollers	6	4	2
WC	(Japan) K Nishikori	2	6	6
(Spain) P Andújar	2	1
(Slovakia) D Hrbatý	6	6
(Belgium) S Darcis	2	6	6
(Belgium) C Rochus	6	3	3
(Belgium) O Rochus	6^{6}	2
2	(Croatia) M Ančić	7^{8}	6

Second round
5	(Germany) R Schüttler	7^{8}	6
(Ecuador) N Lapentti	6^{6}	3
LL	(Argentina) J Mónaco	3	3
4	(Sweden) R Söderling	6	6
WC	(Japan) K Nishikori	6	1	7
(Slovakia) D Hrbatý	1	6	5
(Belgium) S Darcis	6^{4}	4
2	(Croatia) M Ančić	7^{7}	6

Quarterfinals
5	(Germany) R Schüttler	2	5
4	(Sweden) R Söderling	6	7
WC	(Japan) K Nishikori	w/o
2	(Croatia) M Ančić

Semifinals
4	(Sweden) R Söderling	6	6
WC	(Japan) K Nishikori	1	0
