= 2009 If Stockholm Open – Singles =

Singles
- 2009 If Stockholm Open

Final
- Champion: (Cyprus) Marcos Baghdatis
- Runner-up: (Belgium) Olivier Rochus
- Score: 6–1, 7–5

Details
- Draw: 32
- Seeds: 8

Events
| Singles | Doubles |
- If Stockholm Open

David Nalbandian was the defending champion, but did not defend his title due to a hip injury.
Marcos Baghdatis won in the final 6–1, 7–5 against Olivier Rochus.

== Seeds ==
1. (Sweden) Robin Söderling (semifinals, withdrew due to a right elbow injury)
2. (Germany) Tommy Haas (second round, withdrew due to the flu)
3. (Spain) Juan Carlos Ferrero (first round)
4. (Argentina) Juan Mónaco (second round)
5. (Germany) Andreas Beck (first round)
6. (Germany) Benjamin Becker (first round)
7. (Spain) Albert Montañés (first round)
8. (Spain) Feliciano López (second round)

== Draw ==
Key

- Q = Qualifier
- WC = Wild card
- LL = Lucky loser
- Alt = Alternate
- ITF = ITF entry
- PR = Protected ranking
- SR = Special ranking
- SE = Special exempt
- JE = Junior exempt
- JR = Junior Accelerator Programme entrant
- CO = College Accelerator Programme entrant
- NG = Next Gen Accelerator Program entrant
- w/o = Walkover
- r = Retired
- d = Defaulted

=== Finals ===
Semifinals
1 | (Sweden) Robin Söderling
(Cyprus) Marcos Baghdatis | w/o
(Brazil) Thomaz Bellucci | 6^{4} | 6 | 3
(Belgium) Olivier Rochus | 7^{7} | 4 | 6

Final
(Cyprus) Marcos Baghdatis | 6 | 7
(Belgium) Olivier Rochus | 1 | 5

=== Top half ===
First round
1 | (Sweden) R Söderling | 6 | 6
LL | (Ecuador) G Lapentti | 3 | 0
(Romania) V Crivoi | 4 | 1
(Italy) A Seppi | 6 | 6
(Spain) G García-López | 6 | 6
(Spain) A Martín | 3 | 2
(Germany) S Greul | 2 | 6 | 7
6 | (Germany) B Becker | 6 | 3 | 5
3 | (Spain) JC Ferrero | 4 | 2
(Cyprus) M Baghdatis | 6 | 6
(United States) R Kendrick | 6 | 6
(Spain) Ó Hernández | 3 | 4
Q | (Germany) M Berrer | 7 | 7^{9}
Q | (Finland) H Kontinen | 5 | 6^{7}
Q | (France) A Clément | 6 | 6
5 | (Germany) A Beck | 4 | 2

Second round
1 | (Sweden) R Söderling | 6 | 6
(Italy) A Seppi | 1 | 3
(Spain) G García-López | 6 | 7
(Germany) S Greul | 3 | 5
(Cyprus) M Baghdatis | 6 | 6
(United States) R Kendrick | 2 | 2
Q | (Germany) M Berrer | 6 | 6^{7} | 1
Q | (France) A Clément | 3 | 7^{9} | 6

Quarterfinals
1 | (Sweden) R Söderling | 7^{7} | 6
(Spain) G García-López | 6^{4} | 4
(Cyprus) M Baghdatis | 6 | 6
Q | (France) A Clément | 4 | 4

Semifinals
1 | (Sweden) R Söderling
(Cyprus) M Baghdatis | w/o

=== Bottom half ===
First round
7 | (Spain) A Montañés | 4 | 3
(Argentina) L Mayer | 6 | 6
Q | (Denmark) F Nielsen | 6^{6} | 3
(Brazil) T Bellucci | 7^{8} | 6
WC | (Sweden) J Johansson | 7 | 6
(Australia) P Luczak | 5 | 2
(Czech Republic) J Hernych | 2 | 7 | 5
4 | (Argentina) J Mónaco | 6 | 5 | 7
8 | (Spain) F López | 6 | 6
(Latvia) E Gulbis | 2 | 4
WC | (Sweden) A Vinciguerra | 3 | 2
(Belgium) O Rochus | 6 | 6
WC | (Bulgaria) G Dimitrov | 0 | 2
(Finland) J Nieminen | 6 | 6
(France) F Serra | 3 | 4
2 | (Germany) T Haas | 6 | 6

Second round
(Argentina) L Mayer | 5 | 6 | 3
(Brazil) T Bellucci | 7 | 3 | 6
WC | (Sweden) J Johansson | 6 | 6
4 | (Argentina) J Mónaco | 4 | 4
8 | (Spain) F López | 6 | 4 | 1
(Belgium) O Rochus | 4 | 6 | 6
(Finland) J Nieminen | w/o
2 | (Germany) T Haas

Quarterfinals
(Brazil) T Bellucci | 7^{7} | 6
WC | (Sweden) J Johansson | 6^{4} | 3
(Belgium) O Rochus | 6 | 2 | 6
(Finland) J Nieminen | 3 | 6 | 1

Semifinals
(Brazil) T Bellucci | 6^{4} | 6 | 3
(Belgium) O Rochus | 7^{7} | 4 | 6
