= 2008 If Stockholm Open – Doubles =

Doubles
- 2008 If Stockholm Open

Final
- Champions: (Sweden) Jonas Björkman (Zimbabwe) Kevin Ullyett
- Runners-up: (Sweden) Johan Brunström (Sweden) Michael Ryderstedt
- Score: 6–1, 6–3

Events
Singles	Doubles
← 2007 ·	If Stockholm Open	· 2009 →

Jonas Björkman and Max Mirnyi were the defending champions, but Mirnyi chose not to participate, and only Bjorkman competed that year.
Bjorkman partnered with Kevin Ullyett, and won in the final 6–1, 6–3, against Johan Brunström and Michael Ryderstedt.

== Seeds ==
1. (Sweden) Jonas Björkman / (Zimbabwe) Kevin Ullyett (champions)
2. (Sweden) Simon Aspelin / (Austria) Julian Knowle (semifinals)
3. (South Africa) Jeff Coetzee / (South Africa) Wesley Moodie (semifinals)
4. (Brazil) Marcelo Melo / (Brazil) André Sá (quarterfinals)

== Draw ==
=== Key ===
- Q = Qualifier
- WC = Wild card
- LL = Lucky loser
- Alt = Alternate
- SE = Special exempt
- PR = Protected ranking
- ITF = ITF entry
- JE = Junior exempt
- w/o = Walkover
- r = Retired
- d = Defaulted
- SR = Special ranking

=== Draw ===
First round
1	(Sweden) J Björkman (Zimbabwe) K Ullyett	7	6
(Croatia) M Ančić (Pakistan) A-u-H Qureshi	5	4
(United States) S Lipsky (United States) D Martin	6	5	[10]
(Spain) M Granollers (Spain) I Navarro	3	7	[6]
3	(South Africa) J Coetzee (South Africa) W Moodie	3	6	[10]
(Sweden) R Lindstedt (Sweden) R Söderling	6	3	[6]
(Argentina) L Arnold Ker (Brazil) B Soares	7^{10}	6
WC	(Sweden) D Berta (Sweden) P Brydolf	6^{8}	0
WC	(Sweden) J Brunström (Sweden) M Ryderstedt	6	7^{7}
(Argentina) J Acasuso (Spain) Montañés	4	6^{3}
(Argentina) J Mónaco (Argentina) D Nalbandian	1	3
4	(Brazil) M Melo (Brazil) A Sá	6	6
(Czech Republic) J Levinský (Germany) R Schüttler	4	7^{7}	[7]
(United States) J Cerretani (Belgium) S Darcis	6	6^{5}	[10]
(Sweden) T Johansson (Finland) J Nieminen	6	1	[2]
2	(Sweden) S Aspelin (Austria) J Knowle	1	6	[10]

Quarterfinals
1	(Sweden) J Björkman (Zimbabwe) K Ullyett	6	7
(United States) S Lipsky (United States) D Martin	2	5
3	(South Africa) J Coetzee (South Africa) W Moodie	6	6
(Argentina) L Arnold Ker (Brazil) B Soares	4	4
WC	(Sweden) J Brunström (Sweden) M Ryderstedt	7	3	[10]
4	(Brazil) M Melo (Brazil) A Sá	5	6	[7]
(United States) J Cerretani (Belgium) S Darcis	4	1
2	(Sweden) S Aspelin (Austria) J Knowle	6	6

Semifinals
1	(Sweden) J Björkman (Zimbabwe) K Ullyett	6	7^{8}
3	(South Africa) J Coetzee (South Africa) W Moodie	3	6^{6}
WC	(Sweden) J Brunström (Sweden) M Ryderstedt	6^{4}	6	[10]
2	(Sweden) S Aspelin (Austria) J Knowle	7^{7}	4	[4]

Final
1	(Sweden) J Björkman (Zimbabwe) K Ullyett	6	6
WC	(Sweden) J Brunström (Sweden) M Ryderstedt	1	3
