= 2010 If Stockholm Open – Doubles =

Tennis tournament

Doubles
- 2010 If Stockholm Open

Final
- Champions: (United States) Eric Butorac (Netherlands Antilles) Jean-Julien Rojer
- Runners-up: (Sweden) Johan Brunström (Finland) Jarkko Nieminen
- Score: 6–3, 6–4

Events
Singles	Doubles
← 2009 ·	If Stockholm Open	· 2011 →

Bruno Soares and Kevin Ullyett were the defending champions. Ullyett retired from professional tennis in 2009.
As a result, Soares partnered up with his compatriot Marcelo Melo, but they lost in semifinals against Eric Butorac and Jean-Julien Rojer.
Butorac and Rojer won their second doubles title in this year (last win in Tokyo). They defeated Johan Brunström and Jarkko Nieminen 6–3, 6–4 in the final.

== Seeds ==
1. (Poland) Łukasz Kubot / (Austria) Oliver Marach (first round)
2. (South Africa) Wesley Moodie / (Belgium) Dick Norman (semifinals)
3. (Sweden) Robert Lindstedt / (Romania) Horia Tecău (first round)
4. (Sweden) Simon Aspelin / (Australia) Paul Hanley (first round)

== Draw ==
=== Key ===
- Q = Qualifier
- WC = Wild card
- LL = Lucky loser
- Alt = Alternate
- SE = Special exempt
- PR = Protected ranking
- ITF = ITF entry
- JE = Junior exempt
- w/o = Walkover
- r = Retired
- d = Defaulted
- SR = Special ranking

=== Draw ===
First round
1	(Poland) Ł Kubot (Austria) O Marach	4	6	[13]
(Mexico) S González (Germany) P Marx	6	4	[15]
(Spain) M Granollers (Spain) F López	6	4	[5]
(Brazil) M Melo (Brazil) B Soares	1	6	[10]
4	(Sweden) S Aspelin (Australia) P Hanley	6^{4}	3
(United States) E Butorac (Netherlands Antilles) J-J Rojer	7^{7}	6
(France) A Clément (Austria) J Knowle	4	2
WC	(United States) B Battistone (Sweden) A Siljeström	6	6
(Germany) C Kas (Germany) M Kohlmann	6^{5}	6	[16]
ALT	(Spain) D Gimeno-Traver (Italy) A Seppi	7^{7}	3	[14]
(Sweden) J Brunström (Finland) J Nieminen	6	6
3	(Sweden) R Lindstedt (Romania) H Tecău	3	1
(Germany) B Becker (Germany) M Berrer	4	7	[5]
WC	(Finland) H Kontinen (Sweden) M Ryderstedt	6	5	[10]
(Israel) J Erlich (Australia) J Kerr	7	6^{5}	[7]
2	(South Africa) W Moodie (Belgium) D Norman	5	7^{7}	[10]

Quarterfinals
(Mexico) S González (Germany) P Marx	7	3	[5]
(Brazil) M Melo (Brazil) B Soares	5	6	[10]
(United States) E Butorac (Netherlands Antilles) J-J Rojer	7	6^{4}	[10]
WC	(United States) B Battistone (Sweden) A Siljeström	5	7^{7}	[8]
(Germany) C Kas (Germany) M Kohlmann	5	3
(Sweden) J Brunström (Finland) J Nieminen	7	6
WC	(Finland) H Kontinen (Sweden) M Ryderstedt	6^{6}	2
2	(South Africa) W Moodie (Belgium) D Norman	7^{8}	6

Semifinals
(Brazil) M Melo (Brazil) B Soares	6^{3}	4
(United States) E Butorac (Netherlands Antilles) J-J Rojer	7^{7}	6
(Sweden) J Brunström (Finland) J Nieminen	6	6
2	(South Africa) W Moodie (Belgium) D Norman	2	3

Final
(United States) E Butorac (Netherlands Antilles) J-J Rojer	6	6
(Sweden) J Brunström (Finland) J Nieminen	3	4
