= 2010 If Stockholm Open =

- Date: 16–24 October
- Edition: 42nd
- Category: ATP World Tour 250
- Draw: 28S / 16D
- Prize money: €531,000
- Surface: Hard / indoor
- Location: Stockholm, Sweden
- Venue: Kungliga tennishallen

Champions

Singles
- (Switzerland) Roger Federer

Doubles
- (United States) Eric Butorac / (Netherlands Antilles) Jean-Julien Rojer
← 2009 ·	Stockholm Open	· 2011 →

The 2010 If Stockholm Open was a men's tennis tournament played on indoor hard courts. It was the 42nd edition of the event known this year as the If Stockholm Open, and was part of the ATP World Tour 250 Series of the 2010 ATP World Tour. It was held at the Kungliga tennishallen in Stockholm, Sweden, from October 18 through October 24, 2010.

== ATP entrants ==
=== Seeds ===
Country	Player	Rank^{1}	Seed
SUI	Roger Federer	2	1
SWE	Robin Söderling	5	2
CZE	Tomáš Berdych	6	3
CRO	Ivan Ljubičić	17	4
SUI	Stanislas Wawrinka	21	5
ESP	Feliciano López	22	6
BRA	Thomaz Bellucci	25	7
ESP	Tommy Robredo	43	8

- Seeds are based on the rankings of October 11, 2010.

=== Other entrants ===
The following players received wildcards into the singles main draw:

- (United States) James Blake
- (Sweden) Michael Ryderstedt
- (Switzerland) Stanislas Wawrinka

The following players received entry from the qualifying draw:

- (Germany) Matthias Bachinger
- (Croatia) Ivan Dodig
- (Sweden) Filip Prpic
- (Netherlands) Thomas Schoorel

== Finals ==
=== Singles ===
(Switzerland) Roger Federer defeated (Germany) Florian Mayer, 6–4, 6–3

- It was Federer's 3rd title of the year and 64th of his career.

=== Doubles ===
(United States) Eric Butorac / (Netherlands Antilles) Jean-Julien Rojer defeated (Sweden) Johan Brunström / (Finland) Jarkko Nieminen, 6–3, 6–4
