= 2008 If Stockholm Open =

- Date: 6–12 October
- Edition: 40th
- Category: International Series
- Draw: 32S / 16D
- Prize money: €692,000
- Surface: Hard / indoor
- Location: Stockholm, Sweden
- Venue: Kungliga tennishallen

Champions

Singles
- (Argentina) David Nalbandian

Doubles
- (Sweden) Jonas Björkman / (Zimbabwe) Kevin Ullyett
- Stockholm Open

The 2008 If Stockholm Open was a men's tennis tournament played on indoor hard courts. It was the 40th edition of the event known that year as the If Stockholm Open, and was part of the International Series of the 2008 ATP Tour. It took place at the Kungliga tennishallen in Stockholm, Sweden, from 6 October through 12 October 2008.

The singles draw featured ATP No. 7, Buenos Aires champion, Acapulco runner-up David Nalbandian, Wimbledon quarterfinalist, Marseille finalist Mario Ančić, and Australian Open quarterfinalist, Adelaide runner-up Jarkko Nieminen. Also lined up were Rotterdam and Memphis finalist Robin Söderling, Wimbledon semifinalist Rainer Schüttler, José Acasuso, Albert Montañés and Marcel Granollers.

First-seeded David Nalbandian won the singles title.

== Finals ==
=== Singles ===
(Argentina) David Nalbandian defeated (Sweden) Robin Söderling, 6–2, 5–7, 6–3

- It was David Nalbandian's 2nd singles title of the year and the 9th of his career.

=== Doubles ===
(Sweden) Jonas Björkman / (Zimbabwe) Kevin Ullyett defeated (Sweden) Johan Brunström / (Sweden) Michael Ryderstedt, 6–1, 6–3
