= 2005 BMW Open – Singles =

Singles
- 2005 BMW Open

Final
- Champion: (Argentina) David Nalbandian
- Runner-up: (Romania) Andrei Pavel
- Score: 6–4, 6–1

Details
- Draw: 32 (4 Q / 3 WC )
- Seeds: 8

Events
Singles	Doubles
← 2004 ·	BMW Open	· 2006 →

Nikolay Davydenko was the defending champion, but lost in the second round this year.

David Nalbandian won the title, defeating Andrei Pavel 6–4, 6–1 in the final.

== Seeds ==
1. (Argentina) David Nalbandian (champion)
2. (Russia) Nikolay Davydenko (second round)
3. (Croatia) Mario Ančić (second round)
4. (Germany) Tommy Haas (semifinals)
5. (Romania) Andrei Pavel (final)
6. (Russia) Igor Andreev (second round)
7. (Thailand) Paradorn Srichaphan (second round)
8. (Germany) Rainer Schüttler (first round)

== Draw ==
=== Key ===
- Q = Qualifier
- WC = Wild card
- LL = Lucky loser
- Alt = Alternate
- ITF = ITF entry
- PR = Protected ranking
- SR = Special ranking
- SE = Special exempt
- JE = Junior exempt
- JR = Junior Accelerator Programme entrant
- CO = College Accelerator Programme entrant
- NG = Next Gen Accelerator Program entrant
- w/o = Walkover
- r = Retired
- d = Defaulted

=== Finals ===
Semifinals
WC/1	(Argentina) David Nalbandian	6	6
Q	(Finland) Jarkko Nieminen	3	0
4	(Germany) Tommy Haas	4	7^{7}	4
5	(Romania) Andrei Pavel	6	6^{2}	6

Final
WC/1	(Argentina) David Nalbandian	6	6
5	(Romania) Andrei Pavel	1	4

=== Top half ===
First round
WC/1	(Argentina) D Nalbandian	7	1	6
SE	(Ecuador) N Lapentti	5	6	4
(Germany) F Mayer	6	2	3
Q	(Australia) P Luczak	2	6	6
(Argentina) J Mónaco	7	6
(Germany) L Burgsmüller	5	3
(Netherlands) P Wessels	3	4
7	(Thailand) P Srichaphan	6	6
3	(Croatia) M Ančić	6	6
(Argentina) J Acasuso	2	4
Q	(Finland) J Nieminen	7	6
Q	(Czech Republic) B Ulihrach	5	1
(France) J Benneteau	4	1
Q	(Slovakia) M Mertiňák	6	6
(Brazil) R Mello	6	6
8	(Germany) R Schüttler	4	2

Second round
WC/1	(Argentina) D Nalbandian	6	6
Q	(Australia) P Luczak	2	2
(Argentina) J Mónaco	7^{14}	2	6
7	(Thailand) P Srichaphan	6^{12}	6	3
3	(Croatia) M Ančić	6^{5}	4
Q	(Finland) J Nieminen	7^{7}	6
Q	(Czech Republic) M Mertiňák	6	6
(Brazil) R Mello	3	0

Quarterfinals
WC/1	(Argentina) D Nalbandian	6	6
(Argentina) J Mónaco	0	4
Q	(Finland) J Nieminen	3	6	6
Q	(Czech Republic) M Mertiňák	6	1	4

Semifinals
WC/1	(Argentina) D Nalbandian	6	6
Q	(Finland) J Nieminen	3	0

=== Bottom half ===
First round
6	(Russia) I Andreev	6	6
(Czech Republic) J Vaněk	1	2
(Australia) W Arthurs	6	6
(Georgia (country)) I Labadze	3	3
(South Korea) H-T Lee	6	3	6
LL	(Monaco) J-R Lisnard	4	6	3
(Spain) N Almagro	5	3
4	(Germany) T Haas	7	6
5	(Romania) A Pavel	6	6
WC	(Germany) A Waske	4	4
WC	(Germany) T Summerer	2	5
(Netherlands) S Schalken	6	7
(Czech Republic) T Zíb	4	2
(Netherlands) R Sluiter	6	6
(France) J Haehnel	6^{2}	2
2	(Russia) N Davydenko	7^{7}	6

Second round
6	(Russia) I Andreev	4	7^{7}	6^{3}
(Australia) W Arthurs	6	6^{5}	7^{7}
(South Korea) H-T Lee	3	4
4	(Germany) T Haas	6	6
5	(Romania) A Pavel	6	1	6
(Netherlands) S Schalken	1	6	1
(Netherlands) R Sluiter	6	1	6
2	(Russia) N Davydenko	1	6	3

Quarterfinals
(Australia) W Arthurs	6^{6}	6^{5}
4	(Germany) T Haas	7^{8}	7^{7}
5	(Romania) A Pavel	6	3	6
(Netherlands) R Sluiter	1	6	3

Semifinals
4	(Germany) T Haas	4	7^{7}	4
5	(Romania) A Pavel	6	6^{2}	6
