= Björn Phau =

German tennis player

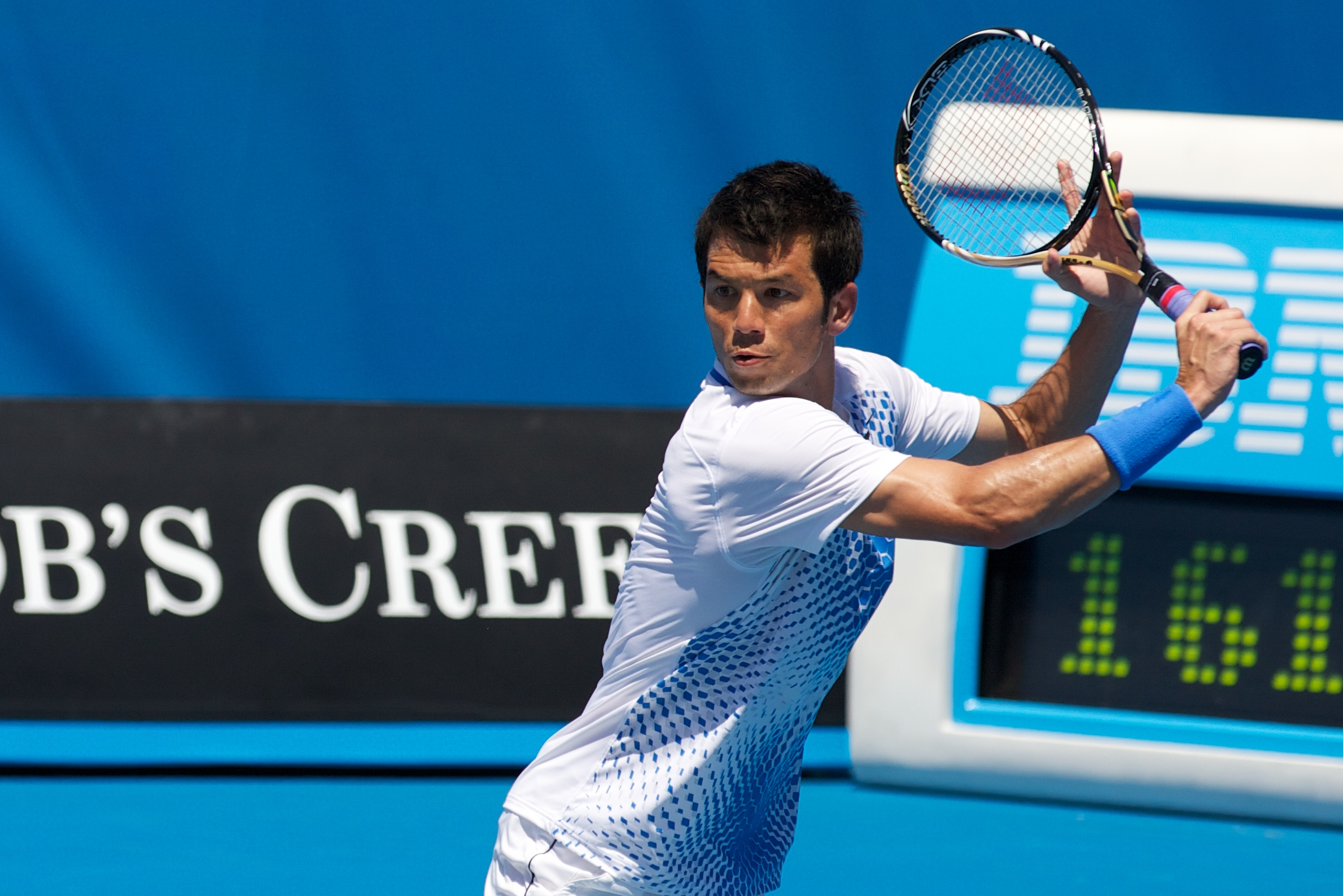
- Björn Phau at the 2011 Australian Open
- Country (sports): Germany
- Born: 4 October 1979 (age 46) Darmstadt, West Germany
- Height: 1.75 m (5 ft 9 in)
- Turned pro: 1999
- Retired: 2014
- Plays: Right-handed (one-handed backhand)
- Prize money: US$1,983,070

Singles
- Career record: 80–138
- Career titles: 0
- Highest ranking: No. 59 (19 June 2006)

Grand Slam singles results
- Australian Open: 2R (2005, 2006)
- French Open: 1R (2000, 2005, 2006, 2011, 2012)
- Wimbledon: 2R (2012)
- US Open: 2R (2001, 2005, 2006, 2012)

Doubles
- Career record: 23–32
- Career titles: 0
- Highest ranking: No. 55 (23 April 2007)

Grand Slam doubles results
- Australian Open: 3R (2011)
- French Open: QF (2006)
- Wimbledon: 2R (2006)
- US Open: 2R (2006)
- Last updated on: 28 August 2015.

Björn Phau (born 4 October 1979) is a retired German tennis player. He achieved a career-high singles ranking of World No. 59 in June 2006. Career highlights include reaching five ATP tour semifinals (Tokyo in 2005, Casablanca in 2006, Beijing in 2008, Houston in 2009 and Zagreb in 2014) and finishing runner-up in doubles at Munich in 2006 (partnering Alexander Peya).

Phau defeated Andre Agassi 7–5, 7–5 at the 2006 Dubai Tennis Championships. In an interview, Agassi cited Phau as one of the quickest tennis players he has ever faced. His main strengths are his movement, foot speed and fitness. He is sponsored by Nike and Wilson.

== Personal life ==
Phau was born in Darmstadt. He is the son of a German mother and an Indonesian father.

== ATP career finals ==
=== Doubles: 1 (0–1) ===
Legend (singles)
Grand Slam (0–0)
Tennis Masters Cup (0–0)
ATP Masters Series (0–0)
ATP International Series Gold (0–0)
ATP Tour (0–1)

Result	W–L	Date	Tournament	Surface	Partner	Opponents	Score
Loss	0–1	1 May 2006	Munich, Germany	Clay	(Austria) Alexander Peya	(Romania) Andrei Pavel (Germany) Alexander Waske	4–6, 2–6

== Challenger & Futures singles titles ==
Legend (singles)
ATP Challenger Tour (7)
ITF Futures (1)

No.	Date	Tournament	Surface	Opponent	Score
1.	2 August 1999	Decatur, US	Hard	(United States) Tom Chicoine	6–0, 6–3
2.	13 August 2001	Bronx, US	Hard	(Israel) Andy Ram	6–2, 6–4
3.	31 October 2005	Busan, South Korea	Hard	(Germany) Simon Greul	6–1, 6–2
4.	16 May 2010	Biella, Italy	Clay	(Italy) Simone Bolelli	6–4, 6–2
5.	30 May 2010	Alessandria, Italy	Clay	(Argentina) Carlos Berlocq	7–6^{(8–6)}, 2–6, 6–2
6.	26 June 2011	Marburg, Germany	Hard	(Czech Republic) Jan Hájek	6–4, 2–6, 6–3
7.	29 January 2012	Heilbronn, Germany	Hard	(Belgium) Ruben Bemelmans	6–7^{(4–7)}, 6–3, 6–4
8.	19 February 2012	Bergamo, Italy	Hard	(Russia) Alexander Kudryavtsev	6–4, 6–4

== Doubles finals (1) ==
No.	Date	Tournament	Surface	Partner	Opponent	Score
1.	31 July 2011	Dortmund	Clay	(Germany) Dominik Meffert	(Russia) Teymuraz Gabashvili (Russia) Andrey Kuznetsov	6–4, 6–3

== Performance timelines ==
Key
W	F	SF	QF	#R	RR	Q#	DNQ	A	NH

(W) winner; (F) finalist; (SF) semifinalist; (QF) quarterfinalist; (#R) rounds 4, 3, 2, 1; (RR) round-robin stage; (Q#) qualification round; (DNQ) did not qualify; (A) absent; (NH) not held; (SR) strike rate (events won / competed); (W–L) win–loss record.

=== Singles ===
Tournament	2000	2001	2002	2003	2004	2005	2006	2007	2008	2009	2010	2011	2012	2013	W–L
Australian Open	Q1	Q3	Q1	1R	Q1	2R	2R	1R	Q1	1R	Q2	1R	1R	1R	2–8
French Open	1R	A	Q2	Q3	Q3	1R	1R	A	Q3	A	Q1	1R	1R	A	0–5
Wimbledon	Q2	Q1	A	Q1	A	1R	1R	A	A	1R	Q2	Q1	2R	A	1–4
US Open	Q2	2R	Q2	Q2	Q1	2R	2R	1R	1R	1R	1R	A	2R	A	4–8
Win–loss	0–1	1–1	0–0	0–1	0–0	2–4	2–4	0–2	0–1	0–3	0–1	0–2	2–4	0–1	7–25
Career statistics
Titles–Finals	0–0	0–0	0–0	0–0	0–0	0–0	0–0	0–0	0–0	0–0	0–0	0–0	0–0	0–0	0–0
Year-end ranking	208	183	148	158	136	87	77	183	120	111	102	156	75	316	

=== Doubles ===
Current through the 2012 US Open (tennis).

Tournament	2006	2007	2008	2009	2010	2011	2012	2013	W–L
Grand Slam tournaments
Australian Open	1R	1R				3R			2–3
French Open	QF	1R					2R		4–3
Wimbledon	2R			1R					1–2
US Open	2R				1R		1R		1–3
Win–loss	5–4	0–2	0–0	0–1	0–1	2–1	1–2		8–11
