= Olivier Rochus =

Belgian tennis player (born 1981)

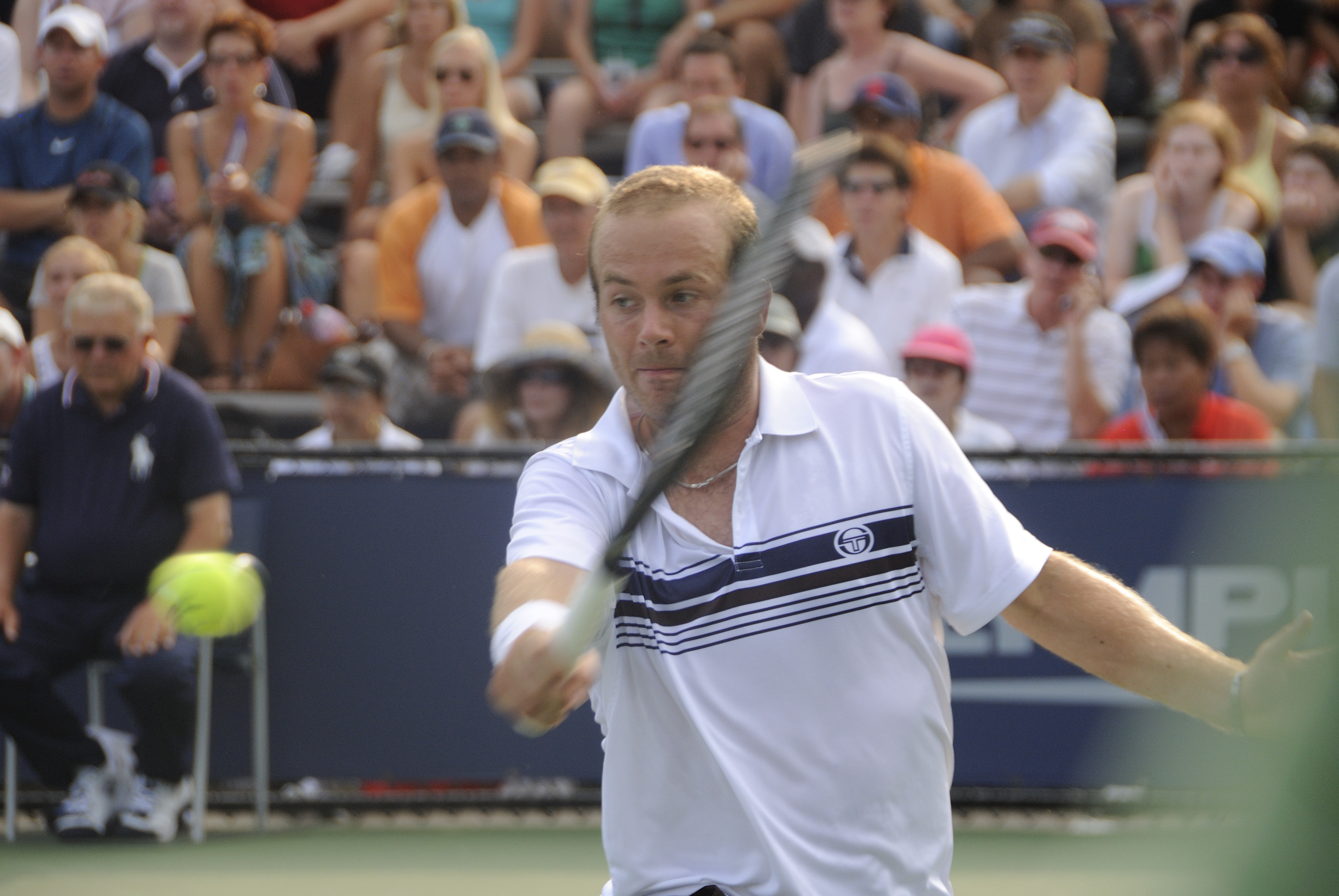
- Country (sports): Belgium
- Residence: Dion-Valmont, Belgium
- Born: 18 January 1981 (age 45) Namur, Belgium
- Height: 1.68 m (5 ft 6 in)
- Turned pro: 1999
- Retired: 2014
- Plays: Right-handed (one-handed backhand)
- Prize money: $4,809,475

Singles
- Career record: 238–276
- Career titles: 2
- Highest ranking: No. 24 (17 October 2005)

Grand Slam singles results
- Australian Open: 4R (2005)
- French Open: 3R (2001, 2006)
- Wimbledon: 4R (2003)
- US Open: 4R (2004)

Doubles
- Career record: 98–121
- Career titles: 2
- Highest ranking: No. 29 (5 July 2004)

Grand Slam doubles results
- Australian Open: 2R (2004, 2005, 2006, 2007)
- French Open: W (2004)
- Wimbledon: 3R (2005)
- US Open: 3R (2006, 2009)

Olivier Rochus (French pronunciation: [ɔlivje ʁɔkys]; born 18 January 1981) is a former Belgian tennis player. Rochus won two singles titles in his career and in 2004 won the French Open doubles title, partnering fellow Belgian Xavier Malisse. His career-high singles ranking is world No. 24.

== Personal information ==
He is the younger brother of Christophe Rochus, also a former top-40 tennis player.

At 1.68 metres (5 ft 6 in) tall, he was the shortest player on the ATP World Tour.

== Career ==
=== Juniors ===
Rochus was a partner of Roger Federer on the junior circuit, winning the boys' doubles title at Wimbledon in 1998.

As a junior, he compiled a singles win–loss record of 81–30 (42–20 in doubles), reaching as high as No. 11 in the world in 1997 (and No. 16 in doubles the following year). Rochus reached at least the quarterfinals of all four junior Grand Slam tournaments (including the semifinals of the French Open and Wimbledon).

=== 1999–2008 ===
He won his first title in Palermo in 2000, defeating his brother in the semifinals and Diego Nargiso in the final. In 2003, he achieved his greatest Master Series result, reaching the quarter-finals of the Hamburg Masters.

He has represented Belgium at two Olympic Games in both the singles and the doubles competitions at Athens and Beijing.

In May 2006, he reached the final of the ATP tournament in Munich, setting up the first ever all-Belgian men's singles final against Kristof Vliegen. He won that final in straight sets.

In June, Rochus faced world No. 1, Roger Federer, in the quarterfinals of the Gerry Weber Open. Rochus held four match points in the second set at 5–6 and in the tie-break. He could not close out the match and eventually lost in three tiebreaks.

=== 2009 ===
He reached the final of the Stockholm Open, after winning to Swede Andreas Vinciguerra in the first round, eighth seed Feliciano López, and Jarkko Nieminen. In the semifinals, he beat best Brazilian Thomaz Bellucci. In the final, he met former Australian Open finalist Marcos Baghdatis, but lost in two sets.

One week later at the Grand Prix de Lyon, he won his first match against French qualifier Vincent Millot. He faced world No. 8, Jo-Wilfried Tsonga, but lost in two short sets.

His next tournament was the Swiss Indoors, where he first won his three qualifying matches. In the first round of the tournament, he lost to his former double partner and world No. 1, Roger Federer.

The last tournament of his tennis season was the AXA Belgian Masters (Challenger), where he met compatriot Steve Darcis in the semifinal.

=== 2010 ===
At the Sony Ericsson Open he defeated Richard Gasquet and the 2007 titlist and second seed Novak Djokovic.

In the Nice tournament, one week prior to Roland Garros, he pulled off another upset, defeating 2009 French Open finalist Robin Söderling.

He defeated Raven Klaasen of South Africa at the Hall of Fame Tennis Championship, but lost to Mardy Fish in the final in three sets.

=== 2011 ===
In March, Rochus lost in the fourth round in Miami to Federer, after defeating Blaž Kavčič, Marcos Baghdatis, and Mikhail Youzhny in the first three rounds. In July, he made it to the final in Newport, where he was defeated by John Isner in straight sets.

=== 2012–13 ===
Rochus had his best success earlier in 2012, reaching the final in Auckland. He lost to Nicolás Almagro in the first round of Wimbledon.

In 2013, he played mostly on the Challenger Tour, never advancing beyond the second round of an ATP event.

== ATP career finals ==
=== Singles: 10 (2 wins, 8 losses) ===
Legend Grand Slam tournaments (0–0) ATP World Tour Masters 1000 (0–0) ATP World Tour 500 series (0–0) ATP World Tour 250 series (2–8)	Finals by surface Hard (0–6) Clay (2–0) Grass (0–2) Carpet (0–0)

Result	W/L	Date	Tournament	Surface	Opponent	Score
Win	1–0	Sep 2000	Campionati Internazionali di Sicilia, Italy	Clay	(Italy) Diego Nargiso	7–6^{(16–14)}, 6–1
Loss	1–1	Feb 2002	Copenhagen Open, Denmark	Hard (i)	(Germany) Lars Burgsmüller	3–6, 3–6
Loss	1–2	Mar 2003	Copenhagen Open, Denmark	Hard (i)	(Slovakia) Karol Kučera	6–7^{(4–7)}, 4–6
Loss	1–3	Jan 2005	Heineken Open, New Zealand	Hard	(Chile) Fernando González	4–6, 2–6
Win	2–3	May 2006	BMW Open, Germany	Clay	(Belgium) Kristof Vliegen	6–4, 6–2
Loss	2–4	Sep 2007	Kingfisher Airlines Tennis Open, India	Hard	(France) Richard Gasquet	3–6, 4–6
Loss	2–5	Oct 2009	Stockholm Open, Sweden	Hard (i)	(Cyprus) Marcos Baghdatis	1–6, 5–7
Loss	2–6	Jul 2010	Hall of Fame Tennis Championships, U.S.	Grass	(United States) Mardy Fish	7–5, 3–6, 4–6
Loss	2–7	Jul 2011	Hall of Fame Tennis Championships, U.S.	Grass	(United States) John Isner	3–6, 6–7^{(6–8)}
Loss	2–8	Jan 2012	Heineken Open, New Zealand	Hard	(Spain) David Ferrer	3–6, 4–6

=== Doubles: 7 (2 wins, 5 losses) ===
Legend Grand Slam tournament (1–0) ATP World Tour Masters 1000 (0–0) ATP World Tour 500 series (0–2) ATP World Tour 250 series (1–3)	Finals by surface Hard (1–3) Clay (1–2) Grass (0–0) Carpet (0–0)

Result	W/L	Date	Tournament	Surface	Partner	Opponents	Score
Win	1.	Jun 2004	French Open, Paris	Clay	(Belgium) Xavier Malisse	(France) Michaël Llodra (France) Fabrice Santoro	7–5, 7–5
Win	2.	Jan 2005	Adelaide International, Australia	Hard	(Belgium) Xavier Malisse	(Sweden) Simon Aspelin (Australia) Todd Perry	7–6^{(7–5)}, 6–4
Loss	1.	Jul 2005	Generali Open, Austria	Clay	(Belgium) Christophe Rochus	(Czech Republic) Leoš Friedl (Romania) Andrei Pavel	2–6, 7–6^{(7–5)}, 0–6
Loss	2.	Jan 2006	Qatar Open, Doha	Hard	(Belgium) Christophe Rochus	(Sweden) Jonas Björkman (Belarus) Max Mirnyi	6–2, 3–6, [8–10]
Loss	3.	Oct 2006	Stockholm Open, Sweden	Hard (i)	(Belgium) Kristof Vliegen	(Australia) Paul Hanley (South Africa) Kevin Ullyett	6–7^{(2–7)}, 4–6
Loss	4.	Jul 2008	Kitzbühel, Austria	Clay	(Argentina) Lucas Arnold Ker	(United States) James Cerretani (Romania) Victor Hănescu	3–6, 5–7
Loss	5.	Feb 2010	PBZ Zagreb Indoors, Croatia	Hard (i)	(France) Arnaud Clément	(Austria) Jürgen Melzer (Germany) Philipp Petzschner	6–3, 3–6, [8–10]

== Performance timelines ==
Key
W	F	SF	QF	#R	RR	Q#	DNQ	A	NH

(W) winner; (F) finalist; (SF) semifinalist; (QF) quarterfinalist; (#R) rounds 4, 3, 2, 1; (RR) round-robin stage; (Q#) qualification round; (DNQ) did not qualify; (A) absent; (NH) not held; (SR) strike rate (events won / competed); (W–L) win–loss record.

=== Singles ===
Tournament	2000	2001	2002	2003	2004	2005	2006	2007	2008	2009	2010	2011	2012	2013	2014	W–L
Grand Slam tournaments
Australian Open	A	1R	1R	2R	1R	4R	2R	2R	1R	A	1R	A	2R	1R	A	7–11
French Open	LQ	3R	2R	1R	1R	2R	3R	1R	1R	Q3	2R	1R	1R	A	A	7–11
Wimbledon	3R	2R	3R	4R	1R	2R	3R	1R	2R	Q1	1R	2R	1R	1R	A	13–13
US Open	1R	1R	1R	1R	4R	3R	3R	1R	1R	2R	1R	1R	1R	Q2	A	8–13
Win–loss	2–2	3–4	3–4	4–4	3–4	7–4	7–4	1–4	1–4	1–1	1–4	1–3	1–4	0–2	0–0	35–48
ATP World Tour Masters 1000
Indian Wells	A	A	1R	3R	1R	2R	3R	3R	2R	A	1R	A	1R	Q2	A	6–9
Miami	A	A	1R	2R	2R	2R	4R	3R	1R	Q1	3R	4R	1R	2R	A	12–10
Monte Carlo	A	A	A	1R	1R	3R	2R	1R	2R	Q1	1R	2R	1R	A	A	5–9
Madrid^{1}	A	A	1R	QF	2R	1R	1R	1R	2R	A	A	1R	1R	A	A	5–9
Rome	A	A	A	1R	A	1R	1R	2R	A	A	A	A	A	A	A	1–4
Toronto / Montreal	A	A	A	A	A	3R	A	A	A	A	A	A	A	A	A	2–1
Cincinnati	A	A	A	A	A	3R	A	1R	A	A	A	Q1	Q2	A	A	2–2
Shanghai^{2}	A	1R	A	1R	A	3R	1R	A	1R	A	A	A	A	A	A	2–5
Paris	A	A	2R	A	A	1R	2R	Q1	Q2	A	A	A	A	A	A	2–3
Win–loss	0–0	0–1	1–4	6–6	2–4	10–9	5–7	3–5	3–5	0–0	2–3	4–3	0–4	1–1	0–0	37–52
Career statistics
Titles / Finals	1–1	0–0	0–1	0–1	0–0	0–1	1–1	0–1	0–0	0–1	0–0	0–1	0–1	0–0	0–0	2–10
Year-end ranking	68	114	64	48	66	27	36	48	122	57	113	67	90	200	580	

^{1}Held as Hamburg Masters (outdoor clay) until 2008, Madrid Masters (outdoor clay) 2009–present.
^{2}Held as Stuttgart Masters (indoor hard) until 2001, Madrid Masters (indoor hard) from 2002 to 2008, and Shanghai Masters (outdoor hard) 2009–present.

=== Doubles ===
Tournament	2003	2004	2005	2006	2007	2008	2009	2010	2011	2012	2013	W–L
Grand Slam tournaments
Australian Open	1R	2R	2R	2R	2R	1R	A	A	A	2R	1R	5–8
French Open	1R	W	3R	3R	3R	QF	A	1R	1R	1R	A	15–8
Wimbledon	A	2R	3R	2R	2R	A	A	1R	A	3R	A	7–6
US Open	2R	1R	1R	3R	1R	1R	3R	1R	1R	A	A	5–9
Win–loss	1–3	8–3	5–4	6–4	4–4	3–3	2–1	0–3	0–2	3–3	0–1	32–31

== Top 10 wins ==
Season	2000	2001	2002	2003	2004	2005	2006	2007	2008	2009	2010	2011	2012	2013	Total
Wins	1	0	1	3	2	2	1	1	0	0	2	0	0	0	13

#	Player	Rank	Event	Surface	Rd	Score
2000
1.	(Sweden) Magnus Norman	2	Wimbledon, United Kingdom	Grass	2R	6–4, 2–6, 6–4, 6–7^{(4–7)}, 6–1
2002
2.	(Russia) Marat Safin	2	Wimbledon, United Kingdom	Grass	2R	6–2, 6–4, 3–6, 7–6^{(7–1)}
2003
3.	(Spain) Albert Costa	9	Indian Wells, United States	Hard	2R	5–7, 6–4, 6–4
4.	(Spain) Albert Costa	8	Hamburg, Germany	Clay	2R	3–6, 6–3, 7–6^{(7–3)}
5.	(Argentina) Guillermo Coria	7	Wimbledon, United Kingdom	Grass	1R	7–5, 7–6^{(7–4)}, 6–3
2004
6.	(Australia) Mark Philippoussis	10	Dubai, United Arab Emirates	Hard	1R	6–2, 7–6^{(10–8)}
7.	(Spain) Carlos Moyá	4	US Open, New York	Hard	3R	4–6, 6–4, 6–3, 6–7^{(5–7)}, 7–5
2005
8.	(Argentina) Guillermo Coria	6	Auckland, New Zealand	Hard	QF	6–4, 6–4
9.	(Argentina) Mariano Puerta	9	Lyon, France	Carpet (i)	1R	4–6, 7–5, 6–3
2006
10.	(Argentina) Guillermo Coria	7	Miami Open, United States	Hard	3R	6–4, 6–3
2007
11.	(Russia) Nikolay Davydenko	4	Dubai, United Arab Emirates	Hard	2R	4–6, 6–4, 6–2
2010
12.	(Serbia) Novak Djokovic	2	Miami Open, United States	Hard	2R	6–2, 6–7^{(7–9)}, 6–4
13.	(Sweden) Robin Söderling	7	Nice, France	Clay	2R	2–6, 6–4, 6–4

Preceded by Juan Carlos Ferrero	ATP Newcomer of the Year; 2000	Succeeded by Andy Roddick
