= 2008 BNP Paribas Masters =

- Date: 25 October – 2 November
- Edition: 36th
- Category: Masters Series
- Draw: 48S / 24D
- Prize money: €2,057,000
- Surface: Hard / indoor
- Location: Paris, France
- Venue: Palais omnisports de Paris-Bercy

Champions

Singles
- (France) Jo-Wilfried Tsonga

Doubles
- (Sweden) Jonas Björkman / (Zimbabwe) Kevin Ullyett
← 2007 ·	Paris Masters	· 2009 →

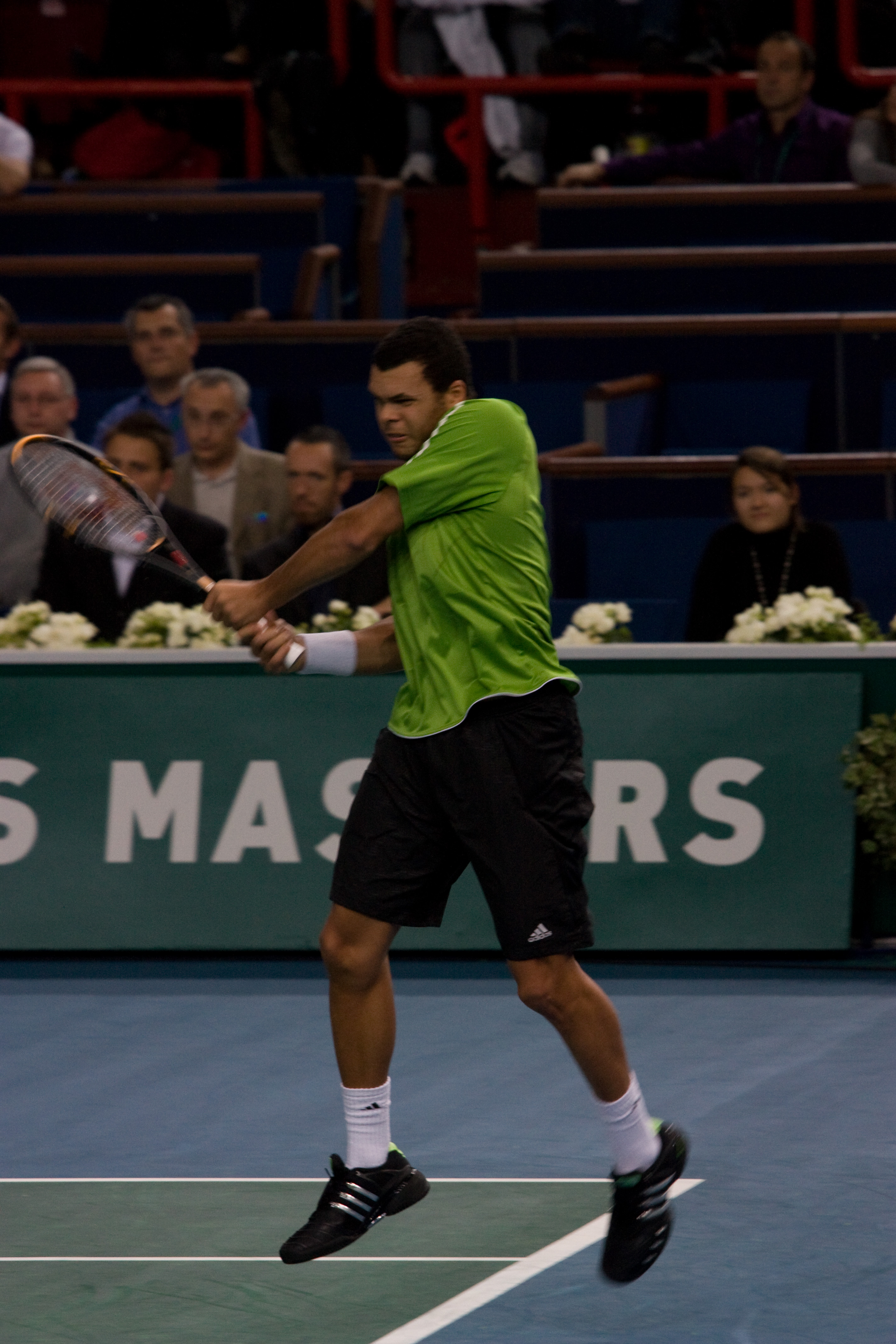
Singles champion Jo-Wilfried Tsonga

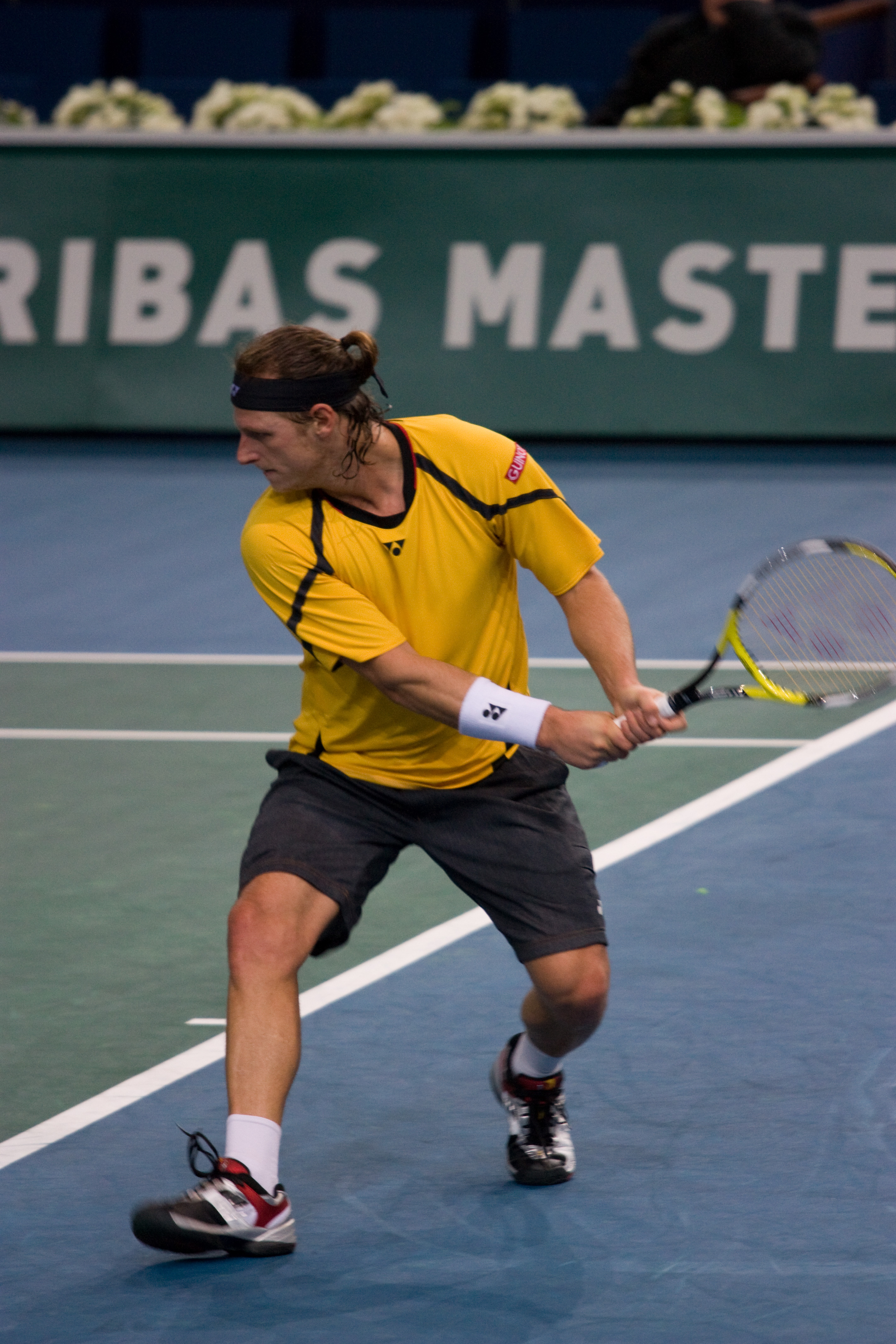
Singles runner-up David Nalbandian

The 2008 Paris Masters (also known as the BNP Paribas Masters for sponsorship reasons) was a men's tennis tournament played on indoor hard courts. It was the 36th edition of the Paris Masters, and was part of the ATP Masters Series of the 2008 ATP Tour. It took place at the Palais omnisports de Paris-Bercy in Paris, France, from 25 October through 2 November 2008.

The singles draw was headlined by year-end World No. 1, Beijing Olympics singles gold medalist, French Open and Wimbledon, Monte Carlo, Hamburg, Toronto Masters champion Rafael Nadal, ATP No. 2, US Open, Estoril, Halle and Basel titlist, Olympic doubles gold medalist Roger Federer, and Australian Open, Indian Wells, Rome Masters winner Novak Djokovic. Also announced were US Open runner-up, Cincinnati, Madrid Masters and recent St. Petersburg titlist Andy Murray, Valencia and 's-Hertogenbosch champion David Ferrer, Nikolay Davydenko, Andy Roddick and David Nalbandian.

== Notable stories ==
=== Race to the championships ===
As the final tournament of the season before the Tennis Masters Cup, several players battled for the remaining spots at the year-end singles event, which plays host to the world's top eight players. Coming into the tournament, twelve players were vying for the final three spots (in descending order of race ranking): Andy Roddick, Juan Martín del Potro, Gilles Simon, David Ferrer, James Blake, Stanislas Wawrinka, Jo-Wilfried Tsonga, David Nalbandian, Fernando Verdasco, Gaël Monfils, and Robin Söderling. Roddick was the first to qualify, when he defeated Madrid Masters runner-up Gilles Simon in the third round. The semifinals wins of Nalbandian over Nikolay Davydenko and Tsonga over Blake assured del Potro of a place, with the championship match set to decide the final qualifier. Home favorite Jo-Wilfried Tsonga eventually defeated defending champion David Nalbandian in three sets, to move to the eight place in the ATP Race, and qualify for the year-end championships.

The doubles event also included a pursuit between Poles Mariusz Fyrstenberg and Marcin Matkowski, South Africans Jeff Coetzee and Wesley Moodie, and Brazilians Marcelo Melo and André Sá for the last spot of the year-end doubles championships. Melo and Sa lost their chance to qualify when they were defeated by Jonas Björkman and Kevin Ullyett in the quarterfinals, while the two other teams advanced to meet in the semis, in a match to decide of the last qualifiers. Coetzee and Moodie eventually came out on top in straight sets to clinch their first Tennis Masters Cup ticket together, the first ever for Coetzee, and the second for Moodie, who had already participated to the 2005 edition with Stephen Huss.

== Finals ==
=== Singles ===
(France) Jo-Wilfried Tsonga defeated (Argentina) David Nalbandian 6–3, 4–6, 6–4

- It was Tsonga's 2nd title of the year, and overall. It was his 1st career Masters title.

=== Doubles ===
(Sweden) Jonas Björkman / (Zimbabwe) Kevin Ullyett defeated (South Africa) Jeff Coetzee / (South Africa) Wesley Moodie 6–2, 6–2
