= 2008 ATP Tour =

Men's tennis circuit

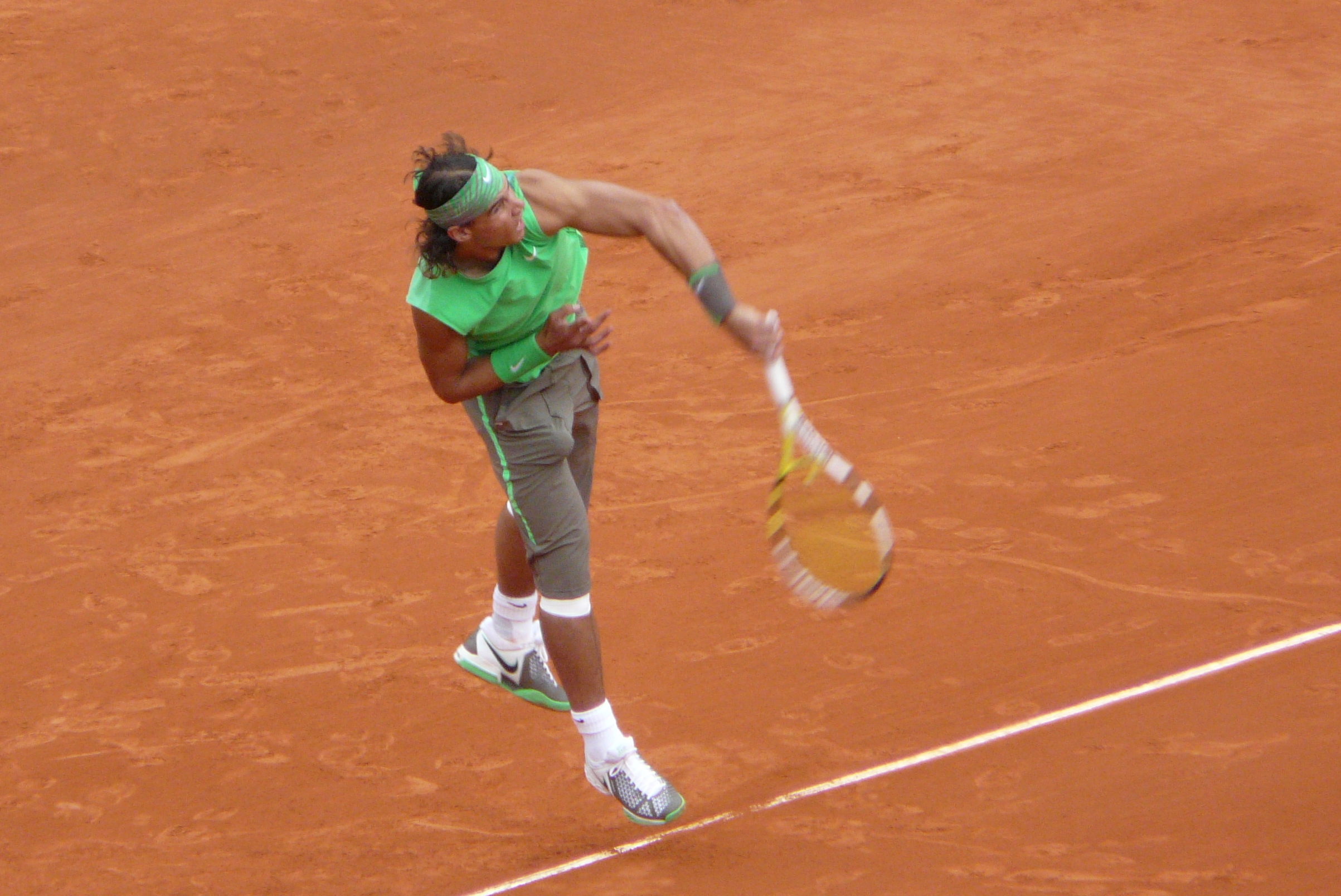
- Rafael Nadal finished the year ranked world No. 1 for the first time in his career. He won eight titles during the season, including two majors at the French Open and the Wimbledon Championships, and the gold medal at the Beijing Olympics. He also won three Masters events.

Details
- Duration: 29 December 2007 – 9 November 2008
- Tournaments: 68
- Categories: Grand Slam (4); ATP Masters Series (9); ATP International Series Gold (9); ATP International Series (42)

Achievements (singles)
- Most titles: (Spain) Rafael Nadal (8)
- Most finals: (Spain) Rafael Nadal (10)
- Prize money leader: (Spain) Rafael Nadal ($6,773,773)
- Points leader: (Spain) Rafael Nadal (6,675)

Awards
- Player of the year: (Spain) Rafael Nadal
- Doubles team of the year: (Serbia) Nenad Zimonjić (Canada) Daniel Nestor
- Most improved player of the year: (France) Jo-Wilfried Tsonga
- Newcomer of the year: (Japan) Kei Nishikori
- Comeback player of the year: (Germany) Rainer Schüttler

The 2008 ATP Tour was the global elite men's professional tennis circuit organised by the Association of Tennis Professionals (ATP) for the 2008 tennis season. The ATP Tour is the elite tour for professional tennis and includes the four Grand Slam tournaments, the Tennis Masters Cup, the ATP Masters Series, the International Series Gold and the International Series tournaments.

== Schedule ==
This is the complete schedule of events on the 2008 ATP Tour, with player progression documented until the quarter-final stage.

=== Key ===
Grand Slam tournaments
Tennis Masters Cup
ATP Masters Series
ATP International Series Gold
ATP International Series
Team events

=== January ===
Week	Tournament	Champions	Runners-up	Semifinalists	Quarterfinalists
31 Dec	Hopman Cup; Perth, Australia; Hopman Cup; Hard (i) – AU$1,000,000 – 8 teams (RR)	United States; 2–1	Serbia	Round Robin (Group A) France; Chinese Taipei; Argentina	Round Robin (Group B) India; Australia; Czech Republic
31 Dec	Next Generation Adelaide International; Adelaide, Australia; International Series; Hard – $465,000 – 32S/16D; Singles – Doubles	(France) Michaël Llodra; 6–3, 6–4	(Finland) Jarkko Nieminen	(France) Jo-Wilfried Tsonga (Australia) Joseph Sirianni	(Australia) Lleyton Hewitt (United States) Vince Spadea (Germany) Benjamin Becker (France) Paul-Henri Mathieu
31 Dec	Next Generation Adelaide International; Adelaide, Australia; International Series; Hard – $465,000 – 32S/16D; Singles – Doubles	(Argentina) Martín García (Brazil) Marcelo Melo; 6–3, 3–6, [10–7]	(Australia) Chris Guccione (Australia) Robert Smeets	(France) Jo-Wilfried Tsonga (Australia) Joseph Sirianni	(Australia) Lleyton Hewitt (United States) Vince Spadea (Germany) Benjamin Becker (France) Paul-Henri Mathieu
31 Dec	Chennai Open; Chennai, India; International Series; Hard – $436,000 – 32S/16D; Singles – Doubles	(Russia) Mikhail Youzhny; 6–0, 6–1	(Spain) Rafael Nadal	(Spain) Carlos Moyá (Croatia) Marin Čilić	(Spain) Guillermo García-López (France) Florent Serra (Belgium) Xavier Malisse (Netherlands) Robin Haase
31 Dec	Chennai Open; Chennai, India; International Series; Hard – $436,000 – 32S/16D; Singles – Doubles	(Thailand) Sanchai Ratiwatana (Thailand) Sonchat Ratiwatana; 6–4, 7–5	(Cyprus) Marcos Baghdatis (France) Marc Gicquel	(Spain) Carlos Moyá (Croatia) Marin Čilić	(Spain) Guillermo García-López (France) Florent Serra (Belgium) Xavier Malisse (Netherlands) Robin Haase
31 Dec	Qatar ExxonMobil Open; Doha, Qatar; International Series; Hard – $1,049,000 – 32S/16D; Singles – Doubles	(United Kingdom) Andy Murray; 6–4, 4–6, 6–2	(Switzerland) Stanislas Wawrinka	(Russia) Nikolay Davydenko (Croatia) Ivan Ljubičić	(Russia) Dmitry Tursunov (Sweden) Thomas Johansson (Germany) Philipp Kohlschreiber (Argentina) Agustín Calleri
31 Dec	Qatar ExxonMobil Open; Doha, Qatar; International Series; Hard – $1,049,000 – 32S/16D; Singles – Doubles	(Germany) Philipp Kohlschreiber (Czech Republic) David Škoch; 6–4, 4–6, [11–9]	(South Africa) Jeff Coetzee (South Africa) Wesley Moodie	(Russia) Nikolay Davydenko (Croatia) Ivan Ljubičić	(Russia) Dmitry Tursunov (Sweden) Thomas Johansson (Germany) Philipp Kohlschreiber (Argentina) Agustín Calleri
7 Jan	Heineken Open; Auckland, New Zealand; International Series; Hard – $464,000 – 32S/16D; Singles – Doubles	(Germany) Philipp Kohlschreiber; 7–6^{(7–4)}, 7–5	(Spain) Juan Carlos Ferrero	(France) Julien Benneteau (Argentina) Juan Mónaco	(Spain) David Ferrer (Chile) Nicolás Massú (France) Michaël Llodra (Germany) Florian Mayer
7 Jan	Heineken Open; Auckland, New Zealand; International Series; Hard – $464,000 – 32S/16D; Singles – Doubles	(Peru) Luis Horna (Argentina) Juan Mónaco; 6–4, 3–6, [10–7]	(Belgium) Xavier Malisse (Austria) Jürgen Melzer	(France) Julien Benneteau (Argentina) Juan Mónaco	(Spain) David Ferrer (Chile) Nicolás Massú (France) Michaël Llodra (Germany) Florian Mayer
7 Jan	Medibank International; Sydney, Australia; International Series; Hard – $465,000 – 32S/16D; Singles – Doubles	(Russia) Dmitry Tursunov; 7–6^{(7–3)}, 7–6^{(7–4)}	(Australia) Chris Guccione	(France) Fabrice Santoro (Czech Republic) Radek Štěpánek	(France) Sébastien Grosjean (Russia) Evgeny Korolev (Czech Republic) Tomáš Berdych (Argentina) Agustín Calleri
7 Jan	Medibank International; Sydney, Australia; International Series; Hard – $465,000 – 32S/16D; Singles – Doubles	(France) Richard Gasquet (France) Jo-Wilfried Tsonga; 4–6, 6–4, [11–9]	(United States) Bob Bryan (United States) Mike Bryan	(France) Fabrice Santoro (Czech Republic) Radek Štěpánek	(France) Sébastien Grosjean (Russia) Evgeny Korolev (Czech Republic) Tomáš Berdych (Argentina) Agustín Calleri
14 Jan; 21 Jan	Australian Open; Melbourne, Australia; Grand Slam; Hard – AU$9,609,870 – 128S/64D/32X; Singles – Doubles – Mixed doubles	(Serbia) Novak Djokovic; 4–6, 6–4, 6–3, 7–6^{(7–2)}	(France) Jo-Wilfried Tsonga	(Switzerland) Roger Federer (Spain) Rafael Nadal	(United States) James Blake (Spain) David Ferrer (Russia) Mikhail Youzhny (Finland) Jarkko Nieminen
14 Jan; 21 Jan	Australian Open; Melbourne, Australia; Grand Slam; Hard – AU$9,609,870 – 128S/64D/32X; Singles – Doubles – Mixed doubles	(Israel) Jonathan Erlich (Israel) Andy Ram; 7–5, 7–6^{(7–4)}	(France) Arnaud Clément (France) Michaël Llodra	(Switzerland) Roger Federer (Spain) Rafael Nadal	(United States) James Blake (Spain) David Ferrer (Russia) Mikhail Youzhny (Finland) Jarkko Nieminen
14 Jan; 21 Jan	Australian Open; Melbourne, Australia; Grand Slam; Hard – AU$9,609,870 – 128S/64D/32X; Singles – Doubles – Mixed doubles	(Serbia) Nenad Zimonjić (China) Sun Tiantian; 7–6^{(7–4)}, 6–4	(India) Mahesh Bhupathi (India) Sania Mirza	(Switzerland) Roger Federer (Spain) Rafael Nadal	(United States) James Blake (Spain) David Ferrer (Russia) Mikhail Youzhny (Finland) Jarkko Nieminen
28 Jan	Moviestar Open; Viña del Mar, Chile; International Series; Clay – $462,000 – 32S/16D; Singles – Doubles	(Chile) Fernando González; Walkover	(Argentina) Juan Mónaco	(Uruguay) Pablo Cuevas (Spain) Santiago Ventura	(Argentina) Carlos Berlocq (Argentina) José Acasuso (Argentina) Juan Pablo Brzezicki (Italy) Fabio Fognini
28 Jan	Moviestar Open; Viña del Mar, Chile; International Series; Clay – $462,000 – 32S/16D; Singles – Doubles	(Argentina) José Acasuso (Argentina) Sebastián Prieto; 6–1, 3–0, retired	(Argentina) Máximo González (Argentina) Juan Mónaco	(Uruguay) Pablo Cuevas (Spain) Santiago Ventura	(Argentina) Carlos Berlocq (Argentina) José Acasuso (Argentina) Juan Pablo Brzezicki (Italy) Fabio Fognini

=== February ===
Week	Tournament	Champions	Runners-up	Semifinalists	Quarterfinalists
4 Feb	BNP Paribas Davis Cup first round Moscow, Russia – hard (i); Ostrava, Czech Republic – carpet (i); Buenos Aires, Argentina – clay Ramat HaSharon, Israel – hard Braunschweig, Germany – clay (i); Lima, Peru – clay Sibiu, Romania – hard (i); Vienna, Austria – clay (i)	First Round winners Russia 3–2; Czech Republic 3–2; Argentina 4–1; Sweden 3–2; Germany 3–2; Spain 5–0; France 5–0; United States 4–1	First Round losers Serbia; Belgium; Great Britain; Israel; South Korea; Peru; Romania; Austria		
11 Feb	Brasil Open; Costa do Sauípe, Brazil; International Series; Clay – $485,000 – 32S/16D; Singles – Doubles	(Spain) Nicolás Almagro; 7–6^{(7–4)}, 3–6, 7–5	(Spain) Carlos Moyá	(Ecuador) Nicolás Lapentti (Italy) Fabio Fognini	(Spain) Óscar Hernández (Argentina) Eduardo Schwank (Czech Republic) Ivo Minář (Italy) Filippo Volandri
11 Feb	Brasil Open; Costa do Sauípe, Brazil; International Series; Clay – $485,000 – 32S/16D; Singles – Doubles	(Brazil) Marcelo Melo (Brazil) André Sá; 4–6, 6–2, [10–7]	(Spain) Albert Montañés (Spain) Santiago Ventura Bertomeu	(Ecuador) Nicolás Lapentti (Italy) Fabio Fognini	(Spain) Óscar Hernández (Argentina) Eduardo Schwank (Czech Republic) Ivo Minář (Italy) Filippo Volandri
11 Feb	Delray Beach International Tennis Championships; Delray Beach, United States; International Series; Hard – $436,000 – 32S/16D; Singles – Doubles	(Japan) Kei Nishikori; 3–6, 6–1, 6–4	(United States) James Blake	(United States) Robby Ginepri (United States) Sam Querrey	(Russia) Igor Kunitsyn (United States) Mardy Fish (United States) Vincent Spadea (United States) Bobby Reynolds
11 Feb	Delray Beach International Tennis Championships; Delray Beach, United States; International Series; Hard – $436,000 – 32S/16D; Singles – Doubles	(Belarus) Max Mirnyi (United Kingdom) Jamie Murray; 6–4, 3–6, [10–6]	(United States) Bob Bryan (United States) Mike Bryan	(United States) Robby Ginepri (United States) Sam Querrey	(Russia) Igor Kunitsyn (United States) Mardy Fish (United States) Vincent Spadea (United States) Bobby Reynolds
11 Feb	Open 13; Marseille, France; International Series; Hard (i) – €534,000 – 32S/16D; Singles – Doubles	(United Kingdom) Andy Murray; 6–3, 6–4	(Croatia) Mario Ančić	(France) Paul-Henri Mathieu (Cyprus) Marcos Baghdatis	(France) Gilles Simon (France) Nicolas Mahut (Russia) Mikhail Youzhny (Sweden) Robin Söderling
11 Feb	Open 13; Marseille, France; International Series; Hard (i) – €534,000 – 32S/16D; Singles – Doubles	(Czech Republic) Martin Damm (Czech Republic) Pavel Vízner; 7–6^{(7–0)}, 7–5	(Switzerland) Yves Allegro (South Africa) Jeff Coetzee	(France) Paul-Henri Mathieu (Cyprus) Marcos Baghdatis	(France) Gilles Simon (France) Nicolas Mahut (Russia) Mikhail Youzhny (Sweden) Robin Söderling
18 Feb	Copa Telmex; Buenos Aires, Argentina; International Series; Clay – $485,000 – 32S/16D; Singles – Doubles	(Argentina) David Nalbandian; 3–6, 7–6^{(7–5)}, 6–4	(Argentina) José Acasuso	(Argentina) Juan Ignacio Chela (Italy) Filippo Volandri	(Italy) Potito Starace (Spain) Nicolás Almagro (Russia) Igor Andreev (Argentina) Agustín Calleri
18 Feb	Copa Telmex; Buenos Aires, Argentina; International Series; Clay – $485,000 – 32S/16D; Singles – Doubles	(Argentina) Agustín Calleri (Peru) Luis Horna; 6–0, 6–7^{(6–8)}, [10–2]	(Austria) Werner Eschauer (Australia) Peter Luczak	(Argentina) Juan Ignacio Chela (Italy) Filippo Volandri	(Italy) Potito Starace (Spain) Nicolás Almagro (Russia) Igor Andreev (Argentina) Agustín Calleri
18 Feb	ABN AMRO World Tennis Tournament; Rotterdam, Netherlands; International Series Gold; Hard (i) – €765,000 – 32S/16D; Singles – Doubles	(France) Michaël Llodra; 6–7^{(3–7)}, 6–3, 7–6^{(7–4)}	(Sweden) Robin Söderling	(France) Gilles Simon (Croatia) Ivo Karlović	(Italy) Andreas Seppi (Russia) Teymuraz Gabashvili (Germany) Mischa Zverev (Netherlands) Robin Haase
18 Feb	ABN AMRO World Tennis Tournament; Rotterdam, Netherlands; International Series Gold; Hard (i) – €765,000 – 32S/16D; Singles – Doubles	(Czech Republic) Tomáš Berdych (Russia) Dmitry Tursunov; 7–5, 3–6, [10–7]	(Germany) Philipp Kohlschreiber (Russia) Mikhail Youzhny	(France) Gilles Simon (Croatia) Ivo Karlović	(Italy) Andreas Seppi (Russia) Teymuraz Gabashvili (Germany) Mischa Zverev (Netherlands) Robin Haase
18 Feb	SAP Open; San José, United States; International Series; Hard (i) – $436,000 – 32S/16D; Singles – Doubles	(United States) Andy Roddick; 6–4, 7–5	(Czech Republic) Radek Štěpánek	(Spain) Guillermo García-López (United States) Robby Ginepri	(United States) Mardy Fish (United States) John Isner (Chinese Taipei) Lu Yen-hsun (United States) James Blake
18 Feb	SAP Open; San José, United States; International Series; Hard (i) – $436,000 – 32S/16D; Singles – Doubles	(United States) Scott Lipsky (United States) David Martin; 7–6^{(7–4)}, 7–5	(United States) Bob Bryan (United States) Mike Bryan	(Spain) Guillermo García-López (United States) Robby Ginepri	(United States) Mardy Fish (United States) John Isner (Chinese Taipei) Lu Yen-hsun (United States) James Blake
25 Feb	Abierto Mexicano Telcel; Acapulco, Mexico; International Series Gold; Clay – $794,000 – 32S/16D; Singles – Doubles	(Spain) Nicolás Almagro; 6–1, 7–6^{(7–1)}	(Argentina) David Nalbandian	(Peru) Luis Horna (Argentina) José Acasuso	(Italy) Potito Starace (Argentina) Agustín Calleri (Spain) Marcel Granollers (Chile) Nicolás Massú
25 Feb	Abierto Mexicano Telcel; Acapulco, Mexico; International Series Gold; Clay – $794,000 – 32S/16D; Singles – Doubles	(Austria) Oliver Marach (Slovakia) Michal Mertiňák; 6–2, 6–7^{(3–7)}, [10–7]	(Argentina) Agustín Calleri (Peru) Luis Horna	(Peru) Luis Horna (Argentina) José Acasuso	(Italy) Potito Starace (Argentina) Agustín Calleri (Spain) Marcel Granollers (Chile) Nicolás Massú
25 Feb	Morgan Keegan Championships; Memphis, United States; International Series Gold; Hard (i) – $769,000 – 32S/16D; Singles – Doubles	(Belgium) Steve Darcis; 6–3, 7–6^{(7–5)}	(Sweden) Robin Söderling	(Czech Republic) Radek Štěpánek (Sweden) Jonas Björkman	(United States) Andy Roddick (Australia) Chris Guccione (Germany) Benjamin Becker (United States) Donald Young
25 Feb	Morgan Keegan Championships; Memphis, United States; International Series Gold; Hard (i) – $769,000 – 32S/16D; Singles – Doubles	(India) Mahesh Bhupathi (The Bahamas) Mark Knowles; 7–6^{(7–5)}, 6–2	(Thailand) Sanchai Ratiwatana (Thailand) Sonchat Ratiwatana	(Czech Republic) Radek Štěpánek (Sweden) Jonas Björkman	(United States) Andy Roddick (Australia) Chris Guccione (Germany) Benjamin Becker (United States) Donald Young
25 Feb	PBZ Zagreb Indoors; Zagreb, Croatia; International Series; Hard (i) – €370,250 – 32S/16D; Singles – Doubles	(Ukraine) Sergiy Stakhovsky; 7–5, 6–4	(Croatia) Ivan Ljubičić	(Croatia) Mario Ančić (Italy) Simone Bolelli	(Russia) Teymuraz Gabashvili (Netherlands) Robin Haase (Belgium) Olivier Rochus (Serbia) Janko Tipsarević
25 Feb	PBZ Zagreb Indoors; Zagreb, Croatia; International Series; Hard (i) – €370,250 – 32S/16D; Singles – Doubles	(Australia) Paul Hanley (Australia) Jordan Kerr; 6–3, 3–6, [10–8]	(Germany) Christopher Kas (Netherlands) Rogier Wassen	(Croatia) Mario Ančić (Italy) Simone Bolelli	(Russia) Teymuraz Gabashvili (Netherlands) Robin Haase (Belgium) Olivier Rochus (Serbia) Janko Tipsarević

=== March ===
Week	Tournament	Champions	Runners-up	Semifinalists	Quarterfinalists
3 Mar	Barclays Dubai Tennis Championships; Dubai, UAE; International Series Gold; Hard – $1,426,000 – 32S/16D; Singles – Doubles	(United States) Andy Roddick; 6–7^{(8–10)}, 6–4, 6–2	(Spain) Feliciano López	(Russia) Nikolay Davydenko (Serbia) Novak Djokovic	(United Kingdom) Andy Murray (Spain) David Ferrer (Russia) Igor Andreev (Spain) Rafael Nadal
3 Mar	Barclays Dubai Tennis Championships; Dubai, UAE; International Series Gold; Hard – $1,426,000 – 32S/16D; Singles – Doubles	(India) Mahesh Bhupathi (The Bahamas) Mark Knowles; 7–5, 7–6^{(9–7)}	(Czech Republic) Martin Damm (Czech Republic) Pavel Vízner	(Russia) Nikolay Davydenko (Serbia) Novak Djokovic	(United Kingdom) Andy Murray (Spain) David Ferrer (Russia) Igor Andreev (Spain) Rafael Nadal
3 Mar	Channel Open; Las Vegas, United States; International Series; Hard – $500,000 – 32S/16D; Singles – Doubles	(United States) Sam Querrey; 4–6, 6–3, 6–4	(South Africa) Kevin Anderson	(United States) Robby Ginepri (Argentina) Guillermo Cañas	(Russia) Evgeny Korolev (Latvia) Ernests Gulbis (United States) Amer Delic (France) Julien Benneteau
3 Mar	Channel Open; Las Vegas, United States; International Series; Hard – $500,000 – 32S/16D; Singles – Doubles	(France) Julien Benneteau (France) Michaël Llodra; 6–4, 4–6, [10–8]	(United States) Bob Bryan (United States) Mike Bryan	(United States) Robby Ginepri (Argentina) Guillermo Cañas	(Russia) Evgeny Korolev (Latvia) Ernests Gulbis (United States) Amer Delic (France) Julien Benneteau
10 Mar; 17 Mar	Pacific Life Open; Indian Wells, United States; Masters Series; Hard – $3,339,000 – 96S/32D; Singles – Doubles	(Serbia) Novak Djokovic; 6–2, 5–7, 6–3	(United States) Mardy Fish	(Switzerland) Roger Federer (Spain) Rafael Nadal	(Germany) Tommy Haas (Argentina) David Nalbandian (Switzerland) Stanislas Wawrinka (United States) James Blake
10 Mar; 17 Mar	Pacific Life Open; Indian Wells, United States; Masters Series; Hard – $3,339,000 – 96S/32D; Singles – Doubles	(Israel) Jonathan Erlich (Israel) Andy Ram; 6–4, 6–4	(Canada) Daniel Nestor (Serbia) Nenad Zimonjić	(Switzerland) Roger Federer (Spain) Rafael Nadal	(Germany) Tommy Haas (Argentina) David Nalbandian (Switzerland) Stanislas Wawrinka (United States) James Blake
24 Mar; 31 Mar	Sony Ericsson Open; Key Biscayne, United States; Masters Series; Hard – $3,520,000 – 96S/32D; Singles – Doubles	(Russia) Nikolay Davydenko; 6–4, 6–2	(Spain) Rafael Nadal	(United States) Andy Roddick (Czech Republic) Tomáš Berdych	(Switzerland) Roger Federer (Serbia) Janko Tipsarević (Russia) Igor Andreev (United States) James Blake
24 Mar; 31 Mar	Sony Ericsson Open; Key Biscayne, United States; Masters Series; Hard – $3,520,000 – 96S/32D; Singles – Doubles	(United States) Bob Bryan (United States) Mike Bryan; 6–2, 6–2	(India) Mahesh Bhupathi (The Bahamas) Mark Knowles	(United States) Andy Roddick (Czech Republic) Tomáš Berdych	(Switzerland) Roger Federer (Serbia) Janko Tipsarević (Russia) Igor Andreev (United States) James Blake

=== April ===
Week	Tournament	Champions	Runners-up	Semifinalists	Quarterfinalists
7 Apr	Davis Cup by BNP Paribas Quarterfinals; Moscow, Russia – hard (i); Buenos Aires, Argentina – clay Bremen, Germany – hard (i); Winston-Salem, USA – hard (i)	Quarterfinal winners Russia 3–2; Argentina 4–1; Spain 4–1; United States 4–1	Quarterfinal losers Czech Republic; Sweden; Germany; France		
14 Apr	Estoril Open; Oeiras, Portugal; International Series; Clay – €370,000 – 32S/16D; Singles – Doubles	(Switzerland) Roger Federer; 7–6^{(7–5)}, 1–2 ret.	(Russia) Nikolay Davydenko	(Germany) Denis Gremelmayr (France) Florent Serra	(Portugal) Frederico Gil (Czech Republic) Jiří Vaněk (Italy) Flavio Cipolla (France) Marc Gicquel
14 Apr	Estoril Open; Oeiras, Portugal; International Series; Clay – €370,000 – 32S/16D; Singles – Doubles	(South Africa) Jeff Coetzee (South Africa) Wesley Moodie; 6–2, 4–6, [10–8]	(United Kingdom) Jamie Murray (Zimbabwe) Kevin Ullyett	(Germany) Denis Gremelmayr (France) Florent Serra	(Portugal) Frederico Gil (Czech Republic) Jiří Vaněk (Italy) Flavio Cipolla (France) Marc Gicquel
14 Apr	US Men's Clay Court Championships; Houston, United States; International Series; Clay – $436,000 – 32S/16D; Singles – Doubles	(Spain) Marcel Granollers; 6–4, 1–6, 7–5	(United States) James Blake	(Spain) Óscar Hernández (United States) Wayne Odesnik	(Argentina) Agustín Calleri (United States) Mardy Fish (Brazil) Marcos Daniel (Argentina) Sergio Roitman
14 Apr	US Men's Clay Court Championships; Houston, United States; International Series; Clay – $436,000 – 32S/16D; Singles – Doubles	(Latvia) Ernests Gulbis (Germany) Rainer Schüttler; 7–5, 7–6^{(7–3)}	(Uruguay) Pablo Cuevas (Spain) Marcel Granollers	(Spain) Óscar Hernández (United States) Wayne Odesnik	(Argentina) Agustín Calleri (United States) Mardy Fish (Brazil) Marcos Daniel (Argentina) Sergio Roitman
14 Apr	Open de Tenis Comunidad Valenciana; Valencia, Spain; International Series; Clay – €370,000 – 32S/16D; Singles – Doubles	(Spain) David Ferrer; 4–6, 6–2, 7–6^{(7–2)}	(Spain) Nicolás Almagro	(Spain) Tommy Robredo (Russia) Evgeny Korolev	(Spain) Fernando Verdasco (Italy) Potito Starace (Netherlands) Robin Haase (Argentina) Juan Mónaco
14 Apr	Open de Tenis Comunidad Valenciana; Valencia, Spain; International Series; Clay – €370,000 – 32S/16D; Singles – Doubles	(Argentina) Máximo González (Argentina) Juan Mónaco; 7–5, 7–5	(United States) Travis Parrott (Slovakia) Filip Polášek	(Spain) Tommy Robredo (Russia) Evgeny Korolev	(Spain) Fernando Verdasco (Italy) Potito Starace (Netherlands) Robin Haase (Argentina) Juan Mónaco
21 Apr	Monte-Carlo Masters; Roquebrune-Cap-Martin, France; Masters Series; Clay – €2,057,000 – 56S/24D; Singles – Doubles	(Spain) Rafael Nadal; 7–5, 7–5	(Switzerland) Roger Federer	(Serbia) Novak Djokovic (Russia) Nikolay Davydenko	(Argentina) David Nalbandian (United States) Sam Querrey (Russia) Igor Andreev (Spain) David Ferrer
21 Apr	Monte-Carlo Masters; Roquebrune-Cap-Martin, France; Masters Series; Clay – €2,057,000 – 56S/24D; Singles – Doubles	(Spain) Rafael Nadal (Spain) Tommy Robredo; 6–3, 6–3	(India) Mahesh Bhupathi (The Bahamas) Mark Knowles	(Serbia) Novak Djokovic (Russia) Nikolay Davydenko	(Argentina) David Nalbandian (United States) Sam Querrey (Russia) Igor Andreev (Spain) David Ferrer
28 Apr	Open Sabadell Atlántico Barcelona; Barcelona, Spain; International Series Gold; Clay – €824,000 – 56S/24D; Singles – Doubles	(Spain) Rafael Nadal; 6–1, 4–6, 6–1	(Spain) David Ferrer	(Germany) Denis Gremelmayr (Switzerland) Stanislas Wawrinka	(Argentina) Juan Ignacio Chela (Spain) Nicolás Almagro (Spain) Albert Montañés (Spain) Tommy Robredo
28 Apr	Open Sabadell Atlántico Barcelona; Barcelona, Spain; International Series Gold; Clay – €824,000 – 56S/24D; Singles – Doubles	(United States) Bob Bryan (United States) Mike Bryan; 6–3, 6–2	(Poland) Mariusz Fyrstenberg (Poland) Marcin Matkowski	(Germany) Denis Gremelmayr (Switzerland) Stanislas Wawrinka	(Argentina) Juan Ignacio Chela (Spain) Nicolás Almagro (Spain) Albert Montañés (Spain) Tommy Robredo
28 Apr	BMW Open; Munich, Germany; International Series; Clay – €370,000 – 32S/16D; Singles – Doubles	(Chile) Fernando González; 7–6^{(7–4)}, 6–7^{(4–7)}, 6–3	(Italy) Simone Bolelli	(France) Paul-Henri Mathieu (Morocco) Younes El Aynaoui	(Croatia) Marin Čilić (South Korea) Lee Hyung-taik (Argentina) Juan Martín del Potro (Russia) Marat Safin
28 Apr	BMW Open; Munich, Germany; International Series; Clay – €370,000 – 32S/16D; Singles – Doubles	(Germany) Michael Berrer (Germany) Rainer Schüttler; 7–5, 3–6, [10–8]	(United States) Scott Lipsky (United States) David Martin	(France) Paul-Henri Mathieu (Morocco) Younes El Aynaoui	(Croatia) Marin Čilić (South Korea) Lee Hyung-taik (Argentina) Juan Martín del Potro (Russia) Marat Safin

=== May ===
Week	Tournament	Champions	Runners-up	Semifinalists	Quarterfinalists
5 May	Internazionali BNL d'Italia; Rome, Italy; Masters Series; Clay – €2,057,000 – 56S/24D; Singles – Doubles	(Serbia) Novak Djokovic; 4–6, 6–3, 6–3	(Switzerland) Stanislas Wawrinka	(Czech Republic) Radek Štěpánek (United States) Andy Roddick	(Switzerland) Roger Federer (Spain) Nicolás Almagro (Spain) Tommy Robredo (United States) James Blake
5 May	Internazionali BNL d'Italia; Rome, Italy; Masters Series; Clay – €2,057,000 – 56S/24D; Singles – Doubles	(United States) Bob Bryan (United States) Mike Bryan; 3–6, 6–4, [10–8]	(Canada) Daniel Nestor (Serbia) Nenad Zimonjić	(Czech Republic) Radek Štěpánek (United States) Andy Roddick	(Switzerland) Roger Federer (Spain) Nicolás Almagro (Spain) Tommy Robredo (United States) James Blake
12 May	Hamburg Masters; Hamburg, Germany; Masters Series; Clay – €2,057,000 – 56S/24D; Singles – Doubles	(Spain) Rafael Nadal; 7–5, 6–7^{(3–7)}, 6–3	(Switzerland) Roger Federer	(Italy) Andreas Seppi (Serbia) Novak Djokovic	(Spain) Fernando Verdasco (Germany) Nicolas Kiefer (Spain) Albert Montañés (Spain) Carlos Moyá
12 May	Hamburg Masters; Hamburg, Germany; Masters Series; Clay – €2,057,000 – 56S/24D; Singles – Doubles	(Canada) Daniel Nestor (Serbia) Nenad Zimonjić; 6–4, 5–7, [10–8]	(United States) Bob Bryan (United States) Mike Bryan	(Italy) Andreas Seppi (Serbia) Novak Djokovic	(Spain) Fernando Verdasco (Germany) Nicolas Kiefer (Spain) Albert Montañés (Spain) Carlos Moyá
19 May	Grand Prix Hassan II; Casablanca, Morocco; International Series; Clay – €370,000 – 32S/16D; Singles – Doubles	(France) Gilles Simon; 7–5, 6–2	(France) Julien Benneteau	(France) Jo-Wilfried Tsonga (Argentina) Agustín Calleri	(Spain) Santiago Ventura (France) Marc Gicquel (Morocco) Younes El Aynaoui (Spain) Óscar Hernández
19 May	Grand Prix Hassan II; Casablanca, Morocco; International Series; Clay – €370,000 – 32S/16D; Singles – Doubles	(Spain) Albert Montañés (Spain) Santiago Ventura Bertomeu; 6–1, 6–2	(United States) James Cerretani (Australia) Todd Perry	(France) Jo-Wilfried Tsonga (Argentina) Agustín Calleri	(Spain) Santiago Ventura (France) Marc Gicquel (Morocco) Younes El Aynaoui (Spain) Óscar Hernández
19 May	Hypo Group Tennis International; Pörtschach, Austria; International Series; Clay – €370,000 – 32S/16D; Singles – Doubles	(Russia) Nikolay Davydenko; 6–2, 2–6, 6–2	(Argentina) Juan Mónaco	(Russia) Igor Kunitsyn (Croatia) Ivan Ljubičić	(Italy) Andreas Seppi (Austria) Jürgen Melzer (Spain) Daniel Gimeno-Traver (United States) Robby Ginepri
19 May	Hypo Group Tennis International; Pörtschach, Austria; International Series; Clay – €370,000 – 32S/16D; Singles – Doubles	(Brazil) Marcelo Melo (Brazil) André Sá; 7–5, 6–7^{(3–7)}, [13–11]	(Austria) Julian Knowle (Austria) Jürgen Melzer	(Russia) Igor Kunitsyn (Croatia) Ivan Ljubičić	(Italy) Andreas Seppi (Austria) Jürgen Melzer (Spain) Daniel Gimeno-Traver (United States) Robby Ginepri
19 May	World Team Cup; Düsseldorf, Germany; World Team Cup €1,500,000 – clay	Sweden; 2–1	Russia	Italy; United States	Spain; Germany; Argentina; Czech Republic
26 May; 2 Jun	French Open; Paris, France; Grand Slam; Clay – €7,077,680 – 128S/64D/32X; Singles – Doubles – Mixed doubles	(Spain) Rafael Nadal; 6–1, 6–3, 6–0	(Switzerland) Roger Federer	(France) Gaël Monfils (Serbia) Novak Djokovic	(Chile) Fernando González (Spain) David Ferrer (Latvia) Ernests Gulbis (Spain) Nicolás Almagro
26 May; 2 Jun	French Open; Paris, France; Grand Slam; Clay – €7,077,680 – 128S/64D/32X; Singles – Doubles – Mixed doubles	(Uruguay) Pablo Cuevas (Peru) Luis Horna; 6–2, 6–3	(Canada) Daniel Nestor (Serbia) Nenad Zimonjić	(France) Gaël Monfils (Serbia) Novak Djokovic	(Chile) Fernando González (Spain) David Ferrer (Latvia) Ernests Gulbis (Spain) Nicolás Almagro
26 May; 2 Jun	French Open; Paris, France; Grand Slam; Clay – €7,077,680 – 128S/64D/32X; Singles – Doubles – Mixed doubles	Mixed Doubles: (United States) Bob Bryan (Belarus) Victoria Azarenka; 6–2, 7–6^{(7–4)}	(Serbia) Nenad Zimonjić (Slovenia) Katarina Srebotnik	(France) Gaël Monfils (Serbia) Novak Djokovic	(Chile) Fernando González (Spain) David Ferrer (Latvia) Ernests Gulbis (Spain) Nicolás Almagro

=== June ===
Week	Tournament	Champions	Runners-up	Semifinalists	Quarterfinalists
9 Jun	Gerry Weber Open; Halle, NRW, Germany; International Series; Grass – €713,000 – 32S/16D; Singles – Doubles	(Switzerland) Roger Federer; 6–3, 6–4	(Germany) Philipp Kohlschreiber	(Germany) Nicolas Kiefer (United States) James Blake	(Cyprus) Marcos Baghdatis (France) Michaël Llodra (Sweden) Robin Söderling (Germany) Andreas Beck
9 Jun	Gerry Weber Open; Halle, NRW, Germany; International Series; Grass – €713,000 – 32S/16D; Singles – Doubles	(Russia) Mikhail Youzhny (Germany) Mischa Zverev; 6–3, 4–6, [10–3]	(Czech Republic) Lukáš Dlouhý (India) Leander Paes	(Germany) Nicolas Kiefer (United States) James Blake	(Cyprus) Marcos Baghdatis (France) Michaël Llodra (Sweden) Robin Söderling (Germany) Andreas Beck
9 Jun	Queen's Club Championships; Queen's Club, London, UK; International Series; Grass – €713,000 – 56S/24D; Singles – Doubles	(Spain) Rafael Nadal; 7–6^{(8–6)}, 7–5	(Serbia) Novak Djokovic	(United States) Andy Roddick (Argentina) David Nalbandian	(Croatia) Ivo Karlović (United Kingdom) Andy Murray (France) Richard Gasquet (Australia) Lleyton Hewitt
9 Jun	Queen's Club Championships; Queen's Club, London, UK; International Series; Grass – €713,000 – 56S/24D; Singles – Doubles	(Canada) Daniel Nestor (Serbia) Nenad Zimonjić; 6–4, 7–6^{(7–3)}	(Brazil) Marcelo Melo (Brazil) André Sá	(United States) Andy Roddick (Argentina) David Nalbandian	(Croatia) Ivo Karlović (United Kingdom) Andy Murray (France) Richard Gasquet (Australia) Lleyton Hewitt
9 Jun	Warsaw Open; Warsaw, Poland; International Series; Clay – €425,000 – 32S/16D; Singles – Doubles	(Russia) Nikolay Davydenko; 6–3, 6–3	(Spain) Tommy Robredo	(Italy) Fabio Fognini (Argentina) Juan Mónaco	(Russia) Evgeny Korolev (Argentina) Guillermo Cañas (Spain) Marcel Granollers (Spain) Óscar Hernández
9 Jun	Warsaw Open; Warsaw, Poland; International Series; Clay – €425,000 – 32S/16D; Singles – Doubles	(Poland) Mariusz Fyrstenberg (Poland) Marcin Matkowski; 6–0, 3–6, [10–4]	(Russia) Nikolay Davydenko (Kazakhstan) Yuri Schukin	(Italy) Fabio Fognini (Argentina) Juan Mónaco	(Russia) Evgeny Korolev (Argentina) Guillermo Cañas (Spain) Marcel Granollers (Spain) Óscar Hernández
16 Jun	Ordina Open 's-Hertogenbosch, Netherlands; International Series; Grass – €370,000 – 32S/16D; Singles – Doubles	(Spain) David Ferrer; 6–4, 6–2	(France) Marc Gicquel	(Argentina) Juan Martín del Potro (Argentina) Guillermo Cañas	(Croatia) Mario Ančić (France) Arnaud Clément (Serbia) Viktor Troicki (Austria) Jürgen Melzer
16 Jun	Ordina Open 's-Hertogenbosch, Netherlands; International Series; Grass – €370,000 – 32S/16D; Singles – Doubles	(Croatia) Mario Ančić (Austria) Jürgen Melzer; 7–6^{(7–5)}, 6–3	(India) Mahesh Bhupathi (India) Leander Paes	(Argentina) Juan Martín del Potro (Argentina) Guillermo Cañas	(Croatia) Mario Ančić (France) Arnaud Clément (Serbia) Viktor Troicki (Austria) Jürgen Melzer
16 Jun	Nottingham Open; Nottingham, UK; International Series; Grass – €370,000 – 32S/16D; Singles – Doubles	(Croatia) Ivo Karlović; 7–5, 6–7^{(4–7)}, 7–6^{(10–8)}	(Spain) Fernando Verdasco	(France) Gaël Monfils (Croatia) Marin Čilić	(United States) Vincent Spadea (Italy) Andreas Seppi (France) Gilles Simon (Sweden) Thomas Johansson
16 Jun	Nottingham Open; Nottingham, UK; International Series; Grass – €370,000 – 32S/16D; Singles – Doubles	(Brazil) Bruno Soares (Zimbabwe) Kevin Ullyett; 6–2, 7–6^{(7–5)}	(South Africa) Jeff Coetzee (United Kingdom) Jamie Murray	(France) Gaël Monfils (Croatia) Marin Čilić	(United States) Vincent Spadea (Italy) Andreas Seppi (France) Gilles Simon (Sweden) Thomas Johansson
23 Jun; 30 Jun	The Championships, Wimbledon; Wimbledon, London, UK; Grand Slam; Grass – £5,257,000 – 128S/64D/32X; Singles – Doubles – Mixed doubles	(Spain) Rafael Nadal; 6–4, 6–4, 6–7^{(5–7)}, 6–7^{(8–10)}, 9–7	(Switzerland) Roger Federer	(Russia) Marat Safin (Germany) Rainer Schüttler	(Croatia) Mario Ančić (Spain) Feliciano López (France) Arnaud Clément (United Kingdom) Andy Murray
23 Jun; 30 Jun	The Championships, Wimbledon; Wimbledon, London, UK; Grand Slam; Grass – £5,257,000 – 128S/64D/32X; Singles – Doubles – Mixed doubles	(Canada) Daniel Nestor (Serbia) Nenad Zimonjić; 7–6^{(14–12)}, 6–7^{(3–7)}, 6–3, 6–3	(Sweden) Jonas Björkman (Zimbabwe) Kevin Ullyett	(Russia) Marat Safin (Germany) Rainer Schüttler	(Croatia) Mario Ančić (Spain) Feliciano López (France) Arnaud Clément (United Kingdom) Andy Murray
23 Jun; 30 Jun	The Championships, Wimbledon; Wimbledon, London, UK; Grand Slam; Grass – £5,257,000 – 128S/64D/32X; Singles – Doubles – Mixed doubles	Mixed Doubles: (United States) Bob Bryan (Australia) Samantha Stosur; 7–5, 6–4	(United States) Mike Bryan (Slovenia) Katarina Srebotnik	(Russia) Marat Safin (Germany) Rainer Schüttler	(Croatia) Mario Ančić (Spain) Feliciano López (France) Arnaud Clément (United Kingdom) Andy Murray

=== July ===
Week	Tournament	Champions	Runners-up	Semifinalists	Quarterfinalists
7 Jul	Swedish Open; Båstad, Sweden; International Series; Clay – €326,000 – 28S/16D; Singles – Doubles	(Spain) Tommy Robredo; 6–4, 6–1	(Czech Republic) Tomáš Berdych	(Spain) David Ferrer (Spain) Fernando Verdasco	(Sweden) Robin Söderling (Finland) Jarkko Nieminen (Italy) Potito Starace (Sweden) Björn Rehnquist
7 Jul	Swedish Open; Båstad, Sweden; International Series; Clay – €326,000 – 28S/16D; Singles – Doubles	(Sweden) Jonas Björkman (Sweden) Robin Söderling; 6–2, 6–2	(Sweden) Johan Brunström (Netherlands Antilles) Jean-Julien Rojer	(Spain) David Ferrer (Spain) Fernando Verdasco	(Sweden) Robin Söderling (Finland) Jarkko Nieminen (Italy) Potito Starace (Sweden) Björn Rehnquist
7 Jul	Suisse Open; Gstaad, Switzerland; International Series; Clay – €389,000 – 28S/16D; Singles – Doubles	(Romania) Victor Hănescu; 6–3, 6–4	(Russia) Igor Andreev	(Switzerland) Stanislas Wawrinka (Spain) Guillermo García-López	(Argentina) Guillermo Cañas (France) Jérémy Chardy (Russia) Mikhail Youzhny (Croatia) Marin Čilić
7 Jul	Suisse Open; Gstaad, Switzerland; International Series; Clay – €389,000 – 28S/16D; Singles – Doubles	(Czech Republic) Jaroslav Levinský (Slovakia) Filip Polášek; 3–6, 6–2, [11–9]	(Switzerland) Stéphane Bohli (Switzerland) Stanislas Wawrinka	(Switzerland) Stanislas Wawrinka (Spain) Guillermo García-López	(Argentina) Guillermo Cañas (France) Jérémy Chardy (Russia) Mikhail Youzhny (Croatia) Marin Čilić
7 Jul	Hall of Fame Tennis Championships; Newport, Rhode Island, United States; International Series; Grass – $385,000 – 28S/16D; Singles – Doubles	(France) Fabrice Santoro; 6–3, 7–5	(India) Prakash Amritraj	(Canada) Frank Dancevic (United States) Vincent Spadea	(India) Rohan Bopanna (Russia) Igor Kunitsyn (Austria) Alexander Peya (Spain) Iván Navarro
7 Jul	Hall of Fame Tennis Championships; Newport, Rhode Island, United States; International Series; Grass – $385,000 – 28S/16D; Singles – Doubles	(United States) Mardy Fish (United States) John Isner; 6–4, 7–6^{(7–1)}	(India) Rohan Bopanna (Pakistan) Aisam-ul-Haq Qureshi	(Canada) Frank Dancevic (United States) Vincent Spadea	(India) Rohan Bopanna (Russia) Igor Kunitsyn (Austria) Alexander Peya (Spain) Iván Navarro
7 Jul	Mercedes Cup; Stuttgart, Germany; International Series Gold; Clay – €568,000 – 28S/16D; Singles – Doubles	(Argentina) Juan Martín del Potro; 6–4, 7–5	(France) Richard Gasquet	(Argentina) Eduardo Schwank (Argentina) Agustín Calleri	(Czech Republic) Jan Hernych (Germany) Philipp Kohlschreiber (Germany) Michael Berrer (Spain) Albert Montañés
7 Jul	Mercedes Cup; Stuttgart, Germany; International Series Gold; Clay – €568,000 – 28S/16D; Singles – Doubles	(Germany) Christopher Kas (Germany) Philipp Kohlschreiber; 6–3, 6–4	(Germany) Michael Berrer (Germany) Mischa Zverev	(Argentina) Eduardo Schwank (Argentina) Agustín Calleri	(Czech Republic) Jan Hernych (Germany) Philipp Kohlschreiber (Germany) Michael Berrer (Spain) Albert Montañés
14 Jul	Dutch Open; Amersfoort, Netherlands; International Series; Clay – €326,000 – 28S/16D; Singles – Doubles	(Spain) Albert Montañés; 1–6, 7–5, 6–3	(Belgium) Steve Darcis	(France) Marc Gicquel (Spain) Óscar Hernández	(Russia) Teymuraz Gabashvili (Belgium) Christophe Rochus (Spain) Marcel Granollers (Argentina) José Acasuso
14 Jul	Dutch Open; Amersfoort, Netherlands; International Series; Clay – €326,000 – 28S/16D; Singles – Doubles	(Czech Republic) František Čermák (Netherlands) Rogier Wassen; 7–5, 7–5	(Netherlands) Jesse Huta Galung (Netherlands) Igor Sijsling	(France) Marc Gicquel (Spain) Óscar Hernández	(Russia) Teymuraz Gabashvili (Belgium) Christophe Rochus (Spain) Marcel Granollers (Argentina) José Acasuso
14 Jul	Indianapolis Tennis Championships; Indianapolis, United States; International Series; Hard – $525,000 – 32S/16D; Singles – Doubles	(France) Gilles Simon; 6–4, 6–4	(Russia) Dmitry Tursunov	(United States) James Blake (United States) Sam Querrey	(Chinese Taipei) Lu Yen-hsun (Chile) Paul Capdeville (United States) Bobby Reynolds (Germany) Tommy Haas
14 Jul	Indianapolis Tennis Championships; Indianapolis, United States; International Series; Hard – $525,000 – 32S/16D; Singles – Doubles	(Australia) Ashley Fisher (United States) Tripp Phillips; 3–6, 6–3, [10–5]	(United States) Scott Lipsky (United States) David Martin	(United States) James Blake (United States) Sam Querrey	(Chinese Taipei) Lu Yen-hsun (Chile) Paul Capdeville (United States) Bobby Reynolds (Germany) Tommy Haas
14 Jul	Austrian Open; Kitzbühel, Austria; International Series Gold; Clay – €571,000 – 32S/16D; Singles – Doubles	(Argentina) Juan Martín del Potro; 6–2, 6–1	(Austria) Jürgen Melzer	(Romania) Victor Hănescu (Italy) Potito Starace	(France) Nicolas Devilder (Argentina) Brian Dabul (Argentina) Eduardo Schwank (Germany) Rainer Schüttler
14 Jul	Austrian Open; Kitzbühel, Austria; International Series Gold; Clay – €571,000 – 32S/16D; Singles – Doubles	(United States) James Cerretani (Romania) Victor Hănescu; 6–3, 7–5	(Argentina) Lucas Arnold Ker (Belgium) Olivier Rochus	(Romania) Victor Hănescu (Italy) Potito Starace	(France) Nicolas Devilder (Argentina) Brian Dabul (Argentina) Eduardo Schwank (Germany) Rainer Schüttler
14 Jul	Croatia Open; Umag, Croatia; International Series; Clay – €326,000 – 28S/16D; Singles – Doubles	(Spain) Fernando Verdasco; 3–6, 6–4, 7–6^{(7–4)}	(Russia) Igor Andreev	(Italy) Fabio Fognini (Argentina) Máximo González	(Germany) Mischa Zverev (Spain) Carlos Moyá (Argentina) Guillermo Cañas (Croatia) Roko Karanušić
14 Jul	Croatia Open; Umag, Croatia; International Series; Clay – €326,000 – 28S/16D; Singles – Doubles	(Slovakia) Michal Mertiňák (Czech Republic) Petr Pála; 2–6, 6–3, [10–5]	(Argentina) Carlos Berlocq (Italy) Fabio Fognini	(Italy) Fabio Fognini (Argentina) Máximo González	(Germany) Mischa Zverev (Spain) Carlos Moyá (Argentina) Guillermo Cañas (Croatia) Roko Karanušić
21 Jul	Rogers Cup; Toronto, Canada; Masters Series; Hard – $2,365,000 – 56S/24D; Singles – Doubles	(Spain) Rafael Nadal; 6–3, 6–2	(Germany) Nicolas Kiefer	(France) Gilles Simon (United Kingdom) Andy Murray	(Croatia) Marin Čilić (United States) James Blake (Serbia) Novak Djokovic (France) Richard Gasquet
21 Jul	Rogers Cup; Toronto, Canada; Masters Series; Hard – $2,365,000 – 56S/24D; Singles – Doubles	(Canada) Daniel Nestor (Serbia) Nenad Zimonjić; 6–2, 4–6, [10–6]	(United States) Bob Bryan (United States) Mike Bryan	(France) Gilles Simon (United Kingdom) Andy Murray	(Croatia) Marin Čilić (United States) James Blake (Serbia) Novak Djokovic (France) Richard Gasquet
28 Jul	Western & Southern Financial Group Masters; Mason, United States; Masters Series; Hard – $2,365,000 – 56S/24D; Singles – Doubles	(United Kingdom) Andy Murray; 7–6^{(7–4)}, 7–6^{(7–5)}	(Serbia) Novak Djokovic	(Croatia) Ivo Karlović (Spain) Rafael Nadal	(Germany) Philipp Kohlschreiber (Spain) Carlos Moyá (Latvia) Ernests Gulbis (Ecuador) Nicolás Lapentti
28 Jul	Western & Southern Financial Group Masters; Mason, United States; Masters Series; Hard – $2,365,000 – 56S/24D; Singles – Doubles	(United States) Bob Bryan (United States) Mike Bryan; 4–6, 7–6^{(7–2)}, [10–7]	(Israel) Jonathan Erlich (Israel) Andy Ram	(Croatia) Ivo Karlović (Spain) Rafael Nadal	(Germany) Philipp Kohlschreiber (Spain) Carlos Moyá (Latvia) Ernests Gulbis (Ecuador) Nicolás Lapentti

=== August ===
Week	Tournament	Champions	Runners-up	Semifinalists	Quarterfinalists
4 Aug	Countrywide Classic; Los Angeles, United States; International Series; Hard – $475,000 – 28S/16D; Singles – Doubles	(Argentina) Juan Martín del Potro; 6–1, 7–6^{(7–2)}	(United States) Andy Roddick	(Germany) Denis Gremelmayr (United States) Mardy Fish	(France) Marc Gicquel (Russia) Marat Safin (United States) Amer Delic (France) Florent Serra
4 Aug	Countrywide Classic; Los Angeles, United States; International Series; Hard – $475,000 – 28S/16D; Singles – Doubles	(India) Rohan Bopanna (United States) Eric Butorac; 7–6^{(7–5)}, 7–6^{(7–5)}	(United States) Travis Parrot (Serbia) Dušan Vemić	(Germany) Denis Gremelmayr (United States) Mardy Fish	(France) Marc Gicquel (Russia) Marat Safin (United States) Amer Delic (France) Florent Serra
11 Aug	Summer Olympic Games; Beijing, China; Olympic Games; Hard; Singles – Doubles	Gold	Silver	Bronze	Quarterfinalists
11 Aug	Summer Olympic Games; Beijing, China; Olympic Games; Hard; Singles – Doubles	(Spain) Rafael Nadal; 6–3, 7–6^{(7–2)}, 6–3	(Chile) Fernando González	(Serbia) Novak Djokovic; 6–3, 7–6^{(7–4)} Fourth place (United States) James Blake	(Switzerland) Roger Federer (France) Paul-Henri Mathieu (France) Gaël Monfils (Austria) Jürgen Melzer
11 Aug	Summer Olympic Games; Beijing, China; Olympic Games; Hard; Singles – Doubles	(Switzerland) Roger Federer; Stanislas Wawrinka; 6–3, 6–4, 6–7^{(4–7)}, 6–3	(Sweden) Simon Aspelin; Thomas Johansson	(Serbia) Novak Djokovic; 6–3, 7–6^{(7–4)} Fourth place (United States) James Blake	(Switzerland) Roger Federer (France) Paul-Henri Mathieu (France) Gaël Monfils (Austria) Jürgen Melzer
11 Aug	Legg Mason Tennis Classic; Washington, D. C., United States; International Series; Hard – $508,000 – 32S/16D; Singles – Doubles	(Argentina) Juan Martín del Potro; 6–3, 6–3	(Serbia) Viktor Troicki	(Russia) Igor Kunitsyn (Germany) Tommy Haas	(United States) Andy Roddick (India) Somdev Devvarman (Colombia) Alejandro Falla (United States) John Isner
11 Aug	Legg Mason Tennis Classic; Washington, D. C., United States; International Series; Hard – $508,000 – 32S/16D; Singles – Doubles	(France) Marc Gicquel (Sweden) Robert Lindstedt; 7–6^{(8–6)}, 6–3	(Brazil) Bruno Soares (Zimbabwe) Kevin Ullyett	(Russia) Igor Kunitsyn (Germany) Tommy Haas	(United States) Andy Roddick (India) Somdev Devvarman (Colombia) Alejandro Falla (United States) John Isner
18 Aug	Pilot Pen Tennis; New Haven, United States; International Series; Hard – $708,000 – 48S/16D; Singles – Doubles	(Croatia) Marin Čilić; 6–4, 4–6, 6–2	(United States) Mardy Fish	(Spain) Fernando Verdasco (Slovenia) Luka Gregorc	(Germany) Mischa Zverev (United States) Jesse Levine (Russia) Igor Andreev (Italy) Andreas Seppi
18 Aug	Pilot Pen Tennis; New Haven, United States; International Series; Hard – $708,000 – 48S/16D; Singles – Doubles	(Brazil) Marcelo Melo (Brazil) André Sá; 7–5, 6–2	(India) Mahesh Bhupathi (The Bahamas) Mark Knowles	(Spain) Fernando Verdasco (Slovenia) Luka Gregorc	(Germany) Mischa Zverev (United States) Jesse Levine (Russia) Igor Andreev (Italy) Andreas Seppi
25 Aug; 1 Sep	US Open; Flushing, New York, United States; Grand Slam; Hard – $9,350,000 – 128S/64D/32X; Singles – Doubles – Mixed doubles	(Switzerland) Roger Federer; 6–2, 7–5, 6–2	(United Kingdom) Andy Murray	(Spain) Rafael Nadal (Serbia) Novak Djokovic	(United States) Mardy Fish (Argentina) Juan Martín del Potro (United States) Andy Roddick (Luxembourg) Gilles Müller
25 Aug; 1 Sep	US Open; Flushing, New York, United States; Grand Slam; Hard – $9,350,000 – 128S/64D/32X; Singles – Doubles – Mixed doubles	(United States) Bob Bryan (United States) Mike Bryan; 7–6^{(7–5)}, 7–6^{(12–10)}	(Czech Republic) Lukáš Dlouhý (India) Leander Paes	(Spain) Rafael Nadal (Serbia) Novak Djokovic	(United States) Mardy Fish (Argentina) Juan Martín del Potro (United States) Andy Roddick (Luxembourg) Gilles Müller
25 Aug; 1 Sep	US Open; Flushing, New York, United States; Grand Slam; Hard – $9,350,000 – 128S/64D/32X; Singles – Doubles – Mixed doubles	Mixed Doubles: (India) Leander Paes (Zimbabwe) Cara Black; 7–6^{(8–6)}, 6–4	(United Kingdom) Jamie Murray (United States) Liezel Huber	(Spain) Rafael Nadal (Serbia) Novak Djokovic	(United States) Mardy Fish (Argentina) Juan Martín del Potro (United States) Andy Roddick (Luxembourg) Gilles Müller

=== September ===
Week	Tournament	Champions	Runners-up	Semifinalists	Quarterfinalists
8 Sep	BCR Open; Bucharest, Romania; International Series; Clay – €370,000 – 32S/16D; Singles – Doubles	(France) Gilles Simon; 6–3, 6–4	(Spain) Carlos Moyá	(France) Richard Gasquet (Argentina) José Acasuso	(Russia) Teymuraz Gabashvili (Spain) Guillermo García-López (Spain) Iván Navarro (France) Florent Serra
8 Sep	BCR Open; Bucharest, Romania; International Series; Clay – €370,000 – 32S/16D; Singles – Doubles	(France) Nicolas Devilder (France) Paul-Henri Mathieu; 7–6^{(7–4)}, 6–7^{(9–11)}, [22–20]	(Poland) Mariusz Fyrstenberg (Poland) Marcin Matkowski	(France) Richard Gasquet (Argentina) José Acasuso	(Russia) Teymuraz Gabashvili (Spain) Guillermo García-López (Spain) Iván Navarro (France) Florent Serra
15 Sep	Davis Cup by BNP Paribas Semifinals; Buenos Aires, Argentina – clay Madrid, Spain – clay	Semifinal winners Argentina 3–2; Spain 4–1	Semifinal losers Russia; United States		
22 Sep	Thailand Open; Bangkok, Thailand; International Series; Hard (i) – $576,000 – 28S/16D; Singles – Doubles	(France) Jo-Wilfried Tsonga; 7–6^{(7–4)}, 6–4	(Serbia) Novak Djokovic	(Czech Republic) Tomáš Berdych (France) Gaël Monfils	(Sweden) Robin Söderling (France) Nicolas Mahut (Germany) Philipp Petzschner (Austria) Jürgen Melzer
22 Sep	Thailand Open; Bangkok, Thailand; International Series; Hard (i) – $576,000 – 28S/16D; Singles – Doubles	(Czech Republic) Lukáš Dlouhý (India) Leander Paes; 6–4, 7–6^{(7–4)}	(United States) Scott Lipsky (United States) David Martin	(Czech Republic) Tomáš Berdych (France) Gaël Monfils	(Sweden) Robin Söderling (France) Nicolas Mahut (Germany) Philipp Petzschner (Austria) Jürgen Melzer
22 Sep	China Open; Beijing, China; International Series; Hard – $524,000 – 28S/16D; Singles – Doubles	(United States) Andy Roddick; 6–4, 6–7^{(6–8)}, 6–3	(Israel) Dudi Sela	(Germany) Rainer Schüttler (Germany) Björn Phau	(Spain) Tommy Robredo (France) Richard Gasquet (Chile) Fernando González (Spain) Juan Carlos Ferrero
22 Sep	China Open; Beijing, China; International Series; Hard – $524,000 – 28S/16D; Singles – Doubles	(Australia) Stephen Huss (United Kingdom) Ross Hutchins; 7–5, 6–4	(Australia) Ashley Fisher (United States) Bobby Reynolds	(Germany) Rainer Schüttler (Germany) Björn Phau	(Spain) Tommy Robredo (France) Richard Gasquet (Chile) Fernando González (Spain) Juan Carlos Ferrero
29 Sep	Open de Moselle; Metz, France; International Series; Hard (i) – €370,000 – 32S/16D; Singles – Doubles	(Russia) Dmitry Tursunov; 7–6^{(8–6)}, 1–6, 6–4	(France) Paul-Henri Mathieu	(Czech Republic) Radek Štěpánek (France) Adrian Mannarino	(Spain) Carlos Moyá (Argentina) Eduardo Schwank (Serbia) Janko Tipsarević (France) Marc Gicquel
29 Sep	Open de Moselle; Metz, France; International Series; Hard (i) – €370,000 – 32S/16D; Singles – Doubles	(France) Arnaud Clément (France) Michaël Llodra; 5–7, 6–3, [10–8]	(Poland) Mariusz Fyrstenberg (Poland) Marcin Matkowski	(Czech Republic) Radek Štěpánek (France) Adrian Mannarino	(Spain) Carlos Moyá (Argentina) Eduardo Schwank (Serbia) Janko Tipsarević (France) Marc Gicquel
29 Sep	Japan Open; Tokyo, Japan; International Series Gold; Hard – $969,000 – 48S/16D; Singles – Doubles	(Czech Republic) Tomáš Berdych; 6–1, 6–4	(Argentina) Juan Martín del Potro	(France) Richard Gasquet (United States) Andy Roddick	(Spain) David Ferrer (Germany) Rainer Schüttler (Chile) Fernando González (Serbia) Viktor Troicki
29 Sep	Japan Open; Tokyo, Japan; International Series Gold; Hard – $969,000 – 48S/16D; Singles – Doubles	(Russia) Mikhail Youzhny (Germany) Mischa Zverev; 6–3, 6–4	(Czech Republic) Lukáš Dlouhý (India) Leander Paes	(France) Richard Gasquet (United States) Andy Roddick	(Spain) David Ferrer (Germany) Rainer Schüttler (Chile) Fernando González (Serbia) Viktor Troicki

=== October ===
Week	Tournament	Champions	Runners-up	Semifinalists	Quarterfinalists
6 Oct	Kremlin Cup; Moscow, Russia; International Series; Hard (i) – $1,049,000 – 32S/16D; Singles – Doubles	(Russia) Igor Kunitsyn; 7–6^{(8–6)}, 6–7^{(4–7)}, 6–3	(Russia) Marat Safin	(Germany) Mischa Zverev (France) Fabrice Santoro	(Russia) Nikolay Davydenko (Serbia) Viktor Troicki (France) Paul-Henri Mathieu (France) Jérémy Chardy
6 Oct	Kremlin Cup; Moscow, Russia; International Series; Hard (i) – $1,049,000 – 32S/16D; Singles – Doubles	(Ukraine) Sergiy Stakhovsky (Italy) Potito Starace; 7–6^{(7–4)}, 2–6, [10–6]	(Australia) Stephen Huss (United Kingdom) Ross Hutchins	(Germany) Mischa Zverev (France) Fabrice Santoro	(Russia) Nikolay Davydenko (Serbia) Viktor Troicki (France) Paul-Henri Mathieu (France) Jérémy Chardy
6 Oct	If Stockholm Open; Stockholm, Sweden; International Series; Hard (i) – €713,000 – 32S/16D; Singles – Doubles	(Argentina) David Nalbandian; 6–2, 5–7, 6–3	(Sweden) Robin Söderling	(Finland) Jarkko Nieminen (Japan) Kei Nishikori	(Spain) Albert Montañés (Spain) Óscar Hernández (Germany) Rainer Schüttler (Croatia) Mario Ančić
6 Oct	If Stockholm Open; Stockholm, Sweden; International Series; Hard (i) – €713,000 – 32S/16D; Singles – Doubles	(Sweden) Jonas Björkman (Zimbabwe) Kevin Ullyett; 6–1, 6–3	(Sweden) Johan Brunström (Sweden) Michael Ryderstedt	(Finland) Jarkko Nieminen (Japan) Kei Nishikori	(Spain) Albert Montañés (Spain) Óscar Hernández (Germany) Rainer Schüttler (Croatia) Mario Ančić
6 Oct	Bank Austria-Tennis Trophy; Vienna, Austria; International Series Gold; Hard (i) – €674,000 – 32S/16D; Singles – Doubles	(Germany) Philipp Petzschner; 6–4, 6–4	(France) Gaël Monfils	(Spain) Feliciano López (Germany) Philipp Kohlschreiber	(Spain) Carlos Moyá (Austria) Jürgen Melzer (Spain) Fernando Verdasco (Chile) Fernando González
6 Oct	Bank Austria-Tennis Trophy; Vienna, Austria; International Series Gold; Hard (i) – €674,000 – 32S/16D; Singles – Doubles	(Belarus) Max Mirnyi (Israel) Andy Ram; 6–1, 7–5	(Germany) Philipp Petzschner (Austria) Alexander Peya	(Spain) Feliciano López (Germany) Philipp Kohlschreiber	(Spain) Carlos Moyá (Austria) Jürgen Melzer (Spain) Fernando Verdasco (Chile) Fernando González
13 Oct	Mutua Madrileña Masters Madrid; Madrid, Spain; Masters Series; Hard (i) – €2,057,000 – 48S/24D; Singles – Doubles	(United Kingdom) Andy Murray; 6–4, 7–6^{(8–6)}	(France) Gilles Simon	(Spain) Rafael Nadal (Switzerland) Roger Federer	(Spain) Feliciano López (Croatia) Ivo Karlović (France) Gaël Monfils (Argentina) Juan Martín del Potro
13 Oct	Mutua Madrileña Masters Madrid; Madrid, Spain; Masters Series; Hard (i) – €2,057,000 – 48S/24D; Singles – Doubles	(Poland) Mariusz Fyrstenberg (Poland) Marcin Matkowski; 6–4, 6–2	(India) Mahesh Bhupathi (The Bahamas) Mark Knowles	(Spain) Rafael Nadal (Switzerland) Roger Federer	(Spain) Feliciano López (Croatia) Ivo Karlović (France) Gaël Monfils (Argentina) Juan Martín del Potro
20 Oct	Davidoff Swiss Indoors; Basel, Switzerland; International Series; Hard (i) – €891,000 – 32S/16D; Singles – Doubles	(Switzerland) Roger Federer; 6–3, 6–4	(Argentina) David Nalbandian	(Spain) Feliciano López (Argentina) Juan Martín del Potro	(Italy) Simone Bolelli (United States) James Blake (Russia) Igor Andreev (Germany) Benjamin Becker
20 Oct	Davidoff Swiss Indoors; Basel, Switzerland; International Series; Hard (i) – €891,000 – 32S/16D; Singles – Doubles	(India) Mahesh Bhupathi (The Bahamas) Mark Knowles; 6–3, 6–3	(Germany) Christopher Kas (Germany) Philipp Kohlschreiber	(Spain) Feliciano López (Argentina) Juan Martín del Potro	(Italy) Simone Bolelli (United States) James Blake (Russia) Igor Andreev (Germany) Benjamin Becker
20 Oct	Grand Prix de Tennis de Lyon; Lyon, France; International Series; Carpet (i) – €713,000 – 32S/16D; Singles – Doubles	(Sweden) Robin Söderling; 6–3, 6–7^{(5–7)}, 6–1	(France) Julien Benneteau	(France) Gilles Simon (France) Jo-Wilfried Tsonga	(United States) Andy Roddick (France) Josselin Ouanna (Spain) Juan Carlos Ferrero (Belgium) Steve Darcis
20 Oct	Grand Prix de Tennis de Lyon; Lyon, France; International Series; Carpet (i) – €713,000 – 32S/16D; Singles – Doubles	(France) Michaël Llodra (Israel) Andy Ram; 6–3, 5–7, [10–8]	(Australia) Stephen Huss (United Kingdom) Ross Hutchins	(France) Gilles Simon (France) Jo-Wilfried Tsonga	(United States) Andy Roddick (France) Josselin Ouanna (Spain) Juan Carlos Ferrero (Belgium) Steve Darcis
20 Oct	St Petersburg Open; Saint Petersburg, Russia; International Series; Hard (i) – $1,049,000 – 32S/16D; Singles – Doubles	(United Kingdom) Andy Murray; 6–1, 6–1	(Kazakhstan) Andrey Golubev	(Spain) Fernando Verdasco (Romania) Victor Hănescu	(Serbia) Janko Tipsarević (Germany) Rainer Schüttler (Germany) Mischa Zverev (Russia) Michail Elgin
20 Oct	St Petersburg Open; Saint Petersburg, Russia; International Series; Hard (i) – $1,049,000 – 32S/16D; Singles – Doubles	(United States) Travis Parrott (Slovakia) Filip Polášek; 3–6, 7–6^{(7–4)}, [10–8]	(India) Rohan Bopanna (Belarus) Max Mirnyi	(Spain) Fernando Verdasco (Romania) Victor Hănescu	(Serbia) Janko Tipsarević (Germany) Rainer Schüttler (Germany) Mischa Zverev (Russia) Michail Elgin
27 Oct	BNP Paribas Masters; Paris, France; Masters Series; Hard (i) – €2,057,000 – 48S/24D; Singles – Doubles	(France) Jo-Wilfried Tsonga; 6–3, 4–6, 6–4	(Argentina) David Nalbandian	(Russia) Nikolay Davydenko (United States) James Blake	(Spain) Rafael Nadal (United Kingdom) Andy Murray (United States) Andy Roddick (Switzerland) Roger Federer
27 Oct	BNP Paribas Masters; Paris, France; Masters Series; Hard (i) – €2,057,000 – 48S/24D; Singles – Doubles	(Sweden) Jonas Björkman (Zimbabwe) Kevin Ullyett; 6–2, 6–2	(South Africa) Jeff Coetzee (South Africa) Wesley Moodie	(Russia) Nikolay Davydenko (United States) James Blake	(Spain) Rafael Nadal (United Kingdom) Andy Murray (United States) Andy Roddick (Switzerland) Roger Federer

=== November ===
Week	Tournament	Champions	Runners-up	Semifinalists	Round robin
10 Nov	Tennis Masters Cup; Shanghai, China; Tennis Masters Cup $4,450,000 – hard (i); Singles – Doubles	(Serbia) Novak Djokovic; 6–1, 7–5	(Russia) Nikolay Davydenko	(United Kingdom) Andy Murray (France) Gilles Simon	(Switzerland) Roger Federer (Czech Republic) Radek Štěpánek (United States) Andy Roddick (Argentina) Juan Martín del Potro (France) Jo-Wilfried Tsonga
10 Nov	Tennis Masters Cup; Shanghai, China; Tennis Masters Cup $4,450,000 – hard (i); Singles – Doubles	(Canada) Daniel Nestor (Serbia) Nenad Zimonjić; 7–6^{(7–3)}, 6–2	(United States) Bob Bryan (United States) Mike Bryan	(United Kingdom) Andy Murray (France) Gilles Simon	(Switzerland) Roger Federer (Czech Republic) Radek Štěpánek (United States) Andy Roddick (Argentina) Juan Martín del Potro (France) Jo-Wilfried Tsonga
17 Nov	Davis Cup by BNP Paribas Final; Mar del Plata, Argentina – hard (i)	Spain 3–1	Argentina		

== Statistical information ==
List of players and titles won (Grand Slam, Masters Cup and Olympic titles in bold), listed in order of number of titles won:

- (Spain) Rafael Nadal – Monte-Carlo Masters, Barcelona, Hamburg Masters, **French Open**, London Queen's Club, **Wimbledon**, Canada Masters, and **Beijing Olympics** (8)
- (United Kingdom) Andy Murray – Doha, Marseille, Cincinnati Masters, Madrid Masters, and St. Petersburg (5)
- (Serbia) Novak Djokovic – **Australian Open**, Indian Wells Masters, Rome Masters and **Tennis Masters Cup** (4)
- (Switzerland) Roger Federer – Estoril, Halle, **US Open**, and Basel (4)
- (Argentina) Juan Martín del Potro – Stuttgart, Kitzbühel, Los Angeles, and Washington, D.C. (4)
- (Russia) Nikolay Davydenko – Miami Masters, Portschach and Warsaw (3)
- (United States) Andy Roddick – San Jose, Dubai and Beijing (3)
- (France) Gilles Simon – Casablanca, Indianapolis and Bucharest (3)
- (Spain) Nicolás Almagro – Costa do Sauipe and Acapulco (2)
- (Spain) David Ferrer – Valencia and 's-Hertogenbosch (2)
- (Chile) Fernando González – Viña del Mar and Munich (2)
- (France) Michaël Llodra – Adelaide and Rotterdam (2)
- (Argentina) David Nalbandian – Buenos Aires and Stockholm (2)
- (France) Jo-Wilfried Tsonga – Bangkok and Paris Masters (2)
- (Russia) Dmitry Tursunov – Sydney and Metz (2)
- (Czech Republic) Tomáš Berdych – Tokyo (1)
- (Croatia) Marin Čilić – New Haven (1)
- (Belgium) Steve Darcis – Memphis (1)
- (Spain) Marcel Granollers – Houston (1)
- (Romania) Victor Hănescu – Gstaad (1)
- (Croatia) Ivo Karlović – Nottingham (1)
- (Germany) Philipp Kohlschreiber – Auckland (1)
- (Russia) Igor Kunitsyn – Moscow (1)
- (Spain) Albert Montañés – Amersfoort (1)
- (Japan) Kei Nishikori – Delray Beach (1)
- (Germany) Philipp Petzschner – Vienna (1)
- (United States) Sam Querrey – Las Vegas (1)
- (Spain) Tommy Robredo – Båstad (1)
- (France) Fabrice Santoro – Newport (1)
- (Sweden) Robin Söderling – Lyon (1)
- (Ukraine) Sergiy Stakhovsky – Zagreb (1)
- (Spain) Fernando Verdasco – Umag (1)
- (Russia) Mikhail Youzhny – Chennai (1)

The following players won their first title:

- (Croatia) Marin Čilić – New Haven
- (Argentina) Juan Martín del Potro – Stuttgart
- (Spain) Marcel Granollers – Houston
- (Romania) Victor Hănescu – Gstaad
- (Russia) Igor Kunitsyn – Moscow
- (Spain) Albert Montañés – Amersfoort
- (Japan) Kei Nishikori – Delray Beach
- (Germany) Philipp Petzschner – Vienna
- (United States) Sam Querrey – Las Vegas
- (Ukraine) Sergiy Stakhovsky – Zagreb
- (France) Jo-Wilfried Tsonga – Bangkok

Titles won by nation:

- Spain 16 (Costa do Sauipe, Acapulco, Valencia, Houston, Monte-Carlo Masters, Barcelona, Hamburg Masters, **French Open**, London, 's-Hertogenbosch, **Wimbledon**, Båstad, Amersfoort, Umag, Canada Masters, and **Beijing Olympics**)
- France 8 (Adelaide, Rotterdam, Casablanca, Newport, Indianapolis, Bucharest, Bangkok, and Paris Masters)
- Russia 7 (Sydney, Chennai, Miami Masters, Portschach, Warsaw, Metz and Moscow)
- Argentina 6 (Buenos Aires, Stuttgart, Kitzbühel, Los Angeles and Washington, D.C., and Stockholm)
- United Kingdom 5 (Doha, Marseille, Cincinnati Masters, Madrid Masters, and St. Petersburg)
- Serbia 4 (**Australian Open**, Indian Wells Masters, Rome Masters and **Tennis Masters Cup**)
- Switzerland 4 (Estoril, Halle, **US Open**, and Basel)
- United States 4 (San Jose, Dubai, Las Vegas and Beijing)
- Chile 2 (Viña del Mar and Munich)
- Croatia 2 (Nottingham and New Haven)
- Germany 2 (Auckland and Vienna)
- Belgium 1 (Memphis)
- Czech Republic 1 (Tokyo)
- Japan 1 (Delray Beach)
- Romania 1 (Gstaad)
- Sweden 1 (Lyon)
- Ukraine 1 (Zagreb)

== Best 5 Matches by ATPWorldTour.com ==
	Event	Round	Surface	Winner	Opponent	Result
1.	Wimbledon	F	Grass	(Spain) Rafael Nadal	(Switzerland) Roger Federer	6-4, 6-4, 6-7^{(5–7)}, 6-7^{(10–8)}, 9-7
2.	ATP Finals	RR	Hard (i)	(United Kingdom) Andy Murray	(Switzerland) Roger Federer	4–6, 7–6^{(7–3)}, 7–5
3.	Chennai Open	SF	Hard	(Spain) Rafael Nadal	(Spain) Carlos Moya	6–7^{(3–7)}, 7–6^{(10–8)}, 7–6^{(7–1)}
4.	Australian Open	R3	Hard	(Australia) Lleyton Hewitt	(Cyprus) Marcos Baghdatis	4-6, 7-5, 7-5, 6–7^{(4–7)}, 6-3
5.	Wimbledon	R4	Grass	(United Kingdom) Andy Murray	(France) Richard Gasquet	5-7, 3–6, 7–6^{(7–3)}, 6-2, 6-4

== Entry rankings ==
=== Singles ===
As of 31 December 2007
Rk	Name	Nation	Points
1	Roger Federer	SUI	7,180
2	Rafael Nadal	ESP	5,735
3	Novak Djokovic	SRB	4,470
4	Nikolay Davydenko	RUS	2,825
5	David Ferrer	ESP	2,750
6	Andy Roddick	USA	2,530
7	Fernando González	CHI	2,005
8	Richard Gasquet	FRA	1,930
9	David Nalbandian	ARG	1,775
10	Tommy Robredo	ESP	1,765
11	Andy Murray	GBR	1,755
12	Tommy Haas	GER	1,720
13	James Blake	USA	1,710
14	Tomáš Berdych	CZE	1,685
15	Guillermo Cañas	ARG	1,653
16	Marcos Baghdatis	CYP	1,600
17	Carlos Moyá	ESP	1,585
18	Ivan Ljubičić	CRO	1,580
19	Mikhail Youzhny	RUS	1,570
20	Juan Ignacio Chela	ARG	1,425

Year-end rankings 2008 (29 December 2008)
Rk	Name	Nation	Points	High	Low	Change
1	Rafael Nadal	ESP	6,675	1	2	▲1
2	Roger Federer	SUI	5,305	1	2	▼1
3	Novak Djokovic	SRB	5,295	3	3	Steady
4	Andy Murray	GBR	3,720	4	22	▲7
5	Nikolay Davydenko	RUS	2,715	4	6	▼1
6	Jo-Wilfried Tsonga	FRA	2,050	6	38	▲37
7	Gilles Simon	FRA	1,980	7	36	▲22
8	Andy Roddick	USA	1,970	6	9	▼2
9	Juan Martín del Potro	ARG	1,945	8	81	▲35
10	James Blake	USA	1,775	7	15	▲3
11	David Nalbandian	ARG	1,725	7	11	▼2
12	David Ferrer	ESP	1,695	4	12	▼7
13	Stan Wawrinka	SUI	1,510	9	35	▲23
14	Gaël Monfils	FRA	1,475	14	65	▲24
15	Fernando González	CHI	1,420	7	25	▼8
16	Fernando Verdasco	ESP	1,415	11	31	▲10
17	Robin Söderling	SWE	1,325	17	59	▲24
18	Nicolás Almagro	ESP	1,270	11	31	▲10
19	Igor Andreev	RUS	1,245	18	37	▲14
20	Tomáš Berdych	CZE	1,215	9	28	▼6

=== Point distribution ===
Points were awarded as follows:

Tournament category	Total financial commitment^{€}	W	F	SF (3rd/4th)	QF	R16	R32	R64	R128	Additional qualifying points
Grand Slam	$6,784,000 to $9,943,000	1000	700	450	250	150	75	35	5	15
Tennis Masters Cup	$4,450,000	750^ 550^{m}	500^ 300^{m}	300^ 100^{m}	(100 for each round robin match win, +200 for a semifinal win, +250 for the final win)					
ATP Masters Series	$2,450,000 to $3,450,000	500	350	225	125	75	35	5 (20)	(5)	15*
Olympics		400	280	205/155	100	50	25	5		
International Series Gold	$1,000,000	300	210	135	75	25	0 (15)	(0)		10*
International Series Gold	$800,000	250	175	110	60	25	0 (15)	(0)		10*
International Series	$1,000,000	250	175	110	60	25	0 (15)	(0)		10*
International Series	$800,000	225	155	100	55	20	0 (10)	(0)		10*
International Series	$600,000	200	140	90	50	15 (20)	0 (10)	(0)		5
International Series	$400,000	175	120	75	40	15	0			5
Challenger	$150,000+H	100	70	45	23	10	0			3
Challenger	$150,000	90	63	40	21	9	0			3
Challenger	$125,000	80	56	36	19	8	0			3
Challenger	$100,000	70	49	31	16	7	0			3
Challenger	$75,000	60	42	27	14	6	0			3
Challenger	$50,000 or $35,000+H	55	38	24	13	5	0			2
Futures	$15,000+H	24	16	8	4	1	0			
Futures	$15,000	18	12	6	3	1	0			
Futures	$10,000	12	8	4	2	1	0			

==== Glossary ====
(€): All prize money and fees for ATP Masters Series, International Series, and Challengers played in Europe must be paid in euros (€). In most cases they are calculated at the US$0.85/EUR exchange rate, but it varies and is often rounded throughout the 2008 ATP Official Rulebook.

(^): Tennis Masters Cup: maximum number of points that can be assigned to the player at this round (after he qualified to the semifinal with 3 round-robin wins)

(m): Tennis Masters Cup: minimum number of points that can be assigned to the player at this round (after he qualified to the semifinal with 1 round-robin win)

+H: Any Challenger or Futures providing hospitality shall receive the points of the next higher prize money level in that category. Monies shown for Challengers and Futures are on-site prize amounts.

Points are assigned to the losers of the round indicated. Any player who reaches the second round by drawing a bye and then loses shall be considered to have lost in the first round and shall receive first round loser's points (5 for Grand Slams and all AMS events). Wild cards at Grand Slams and AMS events receive points only from the 2nd round. No points are awarded for a first round loss at International Series Events, Challenger Series, or Futures Series events.

Players qualifying for the Main Draw through the qualifying competition shall receive qualifying points in addition to any points earned, as per the following table, with the exception of Futures.

(*): 5 points only if the Main Draw is larger than 32 (International Series) or 64 (ATP Masters Series)

In addition to the points allocated above, points are allocated to losers at Grand Slam, Tennis Masters Series, and International Series Gold Tournaments qualifying events in the following manner:

- Grand Slams: 8 points for a last round loser, 4 points for a second round loser
- Tennis Masters Series: 8 points for a last round loser(**), 0 points for a first round loser
- International Series Gold: 5 points for a last round loser(**), 0 points for a first round loser,

(**): 3 points only if the Main Draw is larger than 32 (International Series Gold) or 64 (ATP Masters Series).

==== Sources ====
- The 2015 ATP Official Rulebook. ATP rankings 5. Point Table (Page 153)
- ITF Tennis - Olympic Tennis Event - Ranking Points
- ATPtennis.com - Indesit ATP Ranking Points Breakdown 2007
- stevegtennis.com - Entry System Tournament Points 2007

== ATP race ==
=== Singles ===
Grand Slams and Masters Series in bold. Points are shown in order of scoring. The second row shows the result and the week in which it was achieved. Italics indicate that a player is not yet eliminated from a tournament.

18 events count towards the race, split as follows:

- 4 Grand Slam events
- 9 Masters Series events
- 5 other events

If a player has a valid forfeit or may not enter the Grand Slam or Masters Series, he may count the other events towards the race.

Race updated: 2008-10–27

Rk	Name	Nation	Grand Slams				Masters Series									Best other					Total
Rk	Name	Nation	AUS	RGA	WIM	USO	IND	MIA	MON	ROM	HAM	TOR	CIN	MAD	PAR	1	2	3	4	5	Total
1	Rafael Nadal	ESP	90; SF	200; **W**	200; **W**	90; SF	45; SF	70; F	100; **W**	1 R32	100; **W**	100; **W**	45; SF	45; SF	25; QF	80; **W**	60; **W**	45; **W**	24; F	15; QF	**1335**
2	Roger Federer	SUI	90; SF	140; F	140; F	200; **W**	45; SF	25; QF	70; F	25; QF	70; F	1 R32	15; R16	45; SF	25; QF	50; **W**	45; **W**	35; **W**	20; QF	0 R32	**1041**
3	Novak Djokovic	SRB	200; **W**	90; SF	7 R64	90; SF	100; **W**	1 R64	45; SF	100; **W**	45; SF	25; QF	70; F	15; R16	15; R16	41; 3rd	31; F	27; SF	24; F	3 R16	**929**
4	Andy Murray	GBR	1 R128	15; R32	50; QF	140; F	15; R16	1 R64	15; R16	7 R32	15; R16	45; SF	100; **W**	100; **W**	25; QF	50; **W**	50; **W**	40; **W**	15; QF	0 R32	**684**
5	Nikolay Davydenko	RUS	30; R16	15; R32	1 R128	30; R16	7 R32	100; **W**	45; SF	15; R16	15; R16	15; R16	1 R32	1 R32	45; SF	35; **W**	35; **W**	27; SF	24; F	22; SF	**463**
6	Andy Roddick	USA	15; R32	—	7 R64	50; QF	1 R64	45; SF	—	45; SF	—	15; R16	—	15; R16	25; QF	60; **W**	35; **W**	35; **W**	24; F	22; SF	**394**
7	Jo-Wilfried Tsonga	FRA	140; F	—	—	15; R32	15; R16	7 R32	—	1 R64	7 R32	—	—	15; R16	100; **W**	35; **W**	20; SF	15; SF	15; SF	5 R16	**390**
8	Juan Martín del Potro	ARG	7 R64	7 R64	7 R64	50; QF	—	4 R64	—	4 R64	—	—	—	25; QF	15; R16	50; **W**	50; **W**	35; **W**	35; **W**	80	**369***
9	Gilles Simon	FRA	15; R32	15; R32	1 R128	15; R32	4 R64	1 R128	1 R64	7 R32	7 R32	45; SF	7 R32	70; F	15; R16	36; **W**	35; **W**	35; **W**	27; SF	20; SF	**356**
10	James Blake	USA	50; QF	7 R64	7 R64	15; R32	25; QF	25; QF	—	25; QF	1 R32	25; QF	15; R16	1 R32	45; SF	31; 4th	24; F	24; F	20; SF	15; SF	**355**
11	David Nalbandian	ARG	15; R32	7 R64	1 R128	15; R32	25; QF	1 R64	25; QF	1 R34	—	—	—	15; R16	70; F	45; **W**	35; **W**	35; F	35; F	20; SF	**345**
12	David Ferrer	ESP	50; QF	50; QF	15; R32	15; R32	7 R32	1 R64	25; QF	1 R32	15; R16	15; R16	1 R32	1 R32	1 R32	42; F	35; **W**	35; **W**	15; QF	15; SF	**339**
13	Stanislas Wawrinka	SUI	7 R64	15; R32	30; R16	30; R16	25; QF	1 R64	1 R64	70; F	7 R32	15; R16	—	15; R16	1 R32	35; F	27; SF	15; SF	5; 2R	3 R16	**302**
14	Fernando González	CHI	15; R32	50; QF	7 R64	30; R16	1 R64	7 R32	—	15; R16	—	7 R32	1 R64	1 R32	—	56; F	35; **W**	35; **W**	12; QF	12; QF	**284**
15	Fernando Verdasco	ESP	7 R64	30; R16	30; R16	15; R32	7 R32	1 R64	1 R64	15; R16	25; QF	7 R32	15; R16	1 R32	15; R16	35; **W**	24; F	22; SF	18; SF	15; SF	**283**
16	Gaël Monfils	FRA	—	90; SF	—	30; R16	1 R128	4 R64	15; R16	—	—	1 R64	7 R32	25; QF	15; R16	35; F	20; QF	15; SF	15; SF	6	**279***
17	Robin Söderling	SWE	—	15; R32	7 R64	1 R128	4 R64	7 R32	7 R32	1 R64	15; R16	15; R16	15; R16	7 R32	7 R32	45; **W**	42; F	35; F	31; F	11; QF	**265**
18	Igor Andreev	RUS	15; R32	7 R64	7 R64	30; R16	1 R64	25; QF	25; QF	15; R16	1 R64	15; R16	15; R16	1 R64	7 R32	24; F	24; F	15; QF	12; QF	10; R16	**249**
19	Nicolás Almagro	ESP	1 R128	50; QF	7 R64	15; R32	1 R64	7 R32	15; R16	25; QF	—	—	—	1 R64	—	50; **W**	35; **W**	24; F	15; QF	0	**246**
20	Tomáš Berdych	CZE	30; R16	7 R64	15; R32	1 R128	1 R64	45; SF	—	—	1 R32	7 R32	7 R32	7 R32	15; R16	50; **W**	24; F	15; SF	10; R16	8 QF	**243**

=== Masters Cup entrants ===
The top eight players who qualify on the ATP Race (8 teams for doubles) will compete in the year-ending finale, in Shanghai, China, from November 9 through November 16. World no. 1 Rafael Nadal has withdrawn his name due to a foot injury.

- Masters Cup official website

As of October 5, the following entrants remain entered in the competition:

#	Singles Entrant	Doubles Team Entrant
1.	(Switzerland) Roger Federer	(United States) Bob Bryan (United States) Mike Bryan
2.	(Serbia) Novak Djokovic	(Canada) Daniel Nestor (Serbia) Nenad Zimonjić
3.	(United Kingdom) Andy Murray	(India) Mahesh Bhupathi (The Bahamas) Mark Knowles
4.	(Russia) Nikolay Davydenko	(Sweden) Jonas Björkman (Zimbabwe) Kevin Ullyett
5.	(United States) Andy Roddick	(South Africa) Jeff Coetzee (South Africa) Wesley Moodie
6.	(France) Jo-Wilfried Tsonga	(Czech Republic) Lukáš Dlouhý (India) Leander Paes
7.	(Argentina) Juan Martín del Potro	(Poland) Mariusz Fyrstenberg (Poland) Marcin Matkowski
8.	(France) Gilles Simon	(Uruguay) Pablo Cuevas (Peru) Luis Horna

=== Doubles ===
Unlike the ATP Singles Race, the Stanford ATP Doubles Race uses only the best fourteen tournaments on a team's ranking with no mandatory tournaments counting towards the ranking.

Rk	Name	1	2	3	4	5	6	7	8	9	10	11	12	13	14	Total
1	(United States) Bob Bryan (United States) Mike Bryan	200; **W**	100; **W**	100; **W**	100; **W**	90; SF	70; F	70; F	60; **W**	50; QF	50; QF	25; QF	25; QF	25; QF	24; F	989
2	(Canada) Daniel Nestor (Serbia) Nenad Zimonjić	200; **W**	140; F	100; **W**	100; **W**	70; F	70; F	50; QF	45; **W**	45; SF	30; R16	27; SF	25; QF	12; QF	12; QF	926
3	(India) Mahesh Bhupathi (The Bahamas) Mark Knowles	90; SF	70; F	70; F	70; F	60; **W**	45; SF	40; **W**	30; R16	28; F	25; QF	25; QF	22; QF	15; SF	8 QF	593
4	(Israel) Jonathan Erlich (Israel) Andy Ram	200; **W**	100; **W**	70; F	50; QF	30; R16	27; SF	25; QF	15; SF	15; R32	11; QF	8 QF				551
5	(Sweden) Jonas Björkman (Zimbabwe) Kevin Ullyett	140; F	50; QF	45; **W**	45; SF	45; SF	45; SF	25; QF	25; QF	15; R16	15; SF	15; R32	11; QF			476
6	(Czech Republic) Lukáš Dlouhý (India) Leander Paes	140; F	90; SF	45; SF	35; **W**	35; F	31; F	30; R16	25; QF							431
7	(Poland) Mariusz Fyrstenberg (Poland) Marcin Matkowski	100; **W**	42; F	35; **W**	30; R16	25; QF	25; QF	24; F	24; F	15; R32	15; R16	15; R16	15; R16	15; QF	15; SF	395
8	(South Africa) Jeff Coetzee (South Africa) Wesley Moodie	90; SF	45; SF	45; SF	45; SF	42; F	35; **W**	20; SF	15; R32	15; R16	15; R16	15; R32				375
9	(Brazil) Marcelo Melo (Brazil) André Sá	40; **W**	35; **W**	35; **W**	31; F	30; R16	30; R16	22; SF	15; R32	15; R16	15; R16	15; R16	15; SF	15; R16	14; SF	328
10	(Sweden) Simon Aspelin (Austria) Julian Knowle	30; R16	27; SF	27; SF	27; SF	25; QF	25; QF	25; QF	25; QF	20; QF	18; SF	15; R32	12; QF	10; QF	8 QF	294

=== Points distribution (Singles & Doubles) ===
Tournament category	Total financial commitment	W	F	SF	QF	R16	R32	R64	R128	Additional qualifying points
Grand Slam	$6,784,000 to $9,943,000	200	140	90	50	30	15	7	1	3
Tennis Masters Cup	$4,450,000	150	if undefeated (20 for each round robin match win, +40 for a semifinal win, +50 for winning finalist)							
ATP Masters Series	$2,450,000 to $3,450,000	100	70	45	25	15	7	1(4)	(1)	3*
Olympic Games	$0	80	56	41^{3rd} 31^{4th}	20	10	5	1		-
International Series Gold	$1,000,000	60	42	27	15	5	3	1		2*
International Series Gold	$800,000	50	35	22	12	5	3	1		2*
International Series	$1,000,000	50	35	22	12	5	3	1		2*
International Series	$800,000	45	31	20	11	4	2	1		2*
International Series	$600,000	40	28	18	10	3(4)	1(2)	(1)		1
International Series	$400,000	35	24	15	8	3	1			1

(*) 1 point only if the Main Draw is larger than 32 (International Series) or 64 (Tennis Masters Series).

== Prize money leaders ==
As of 17 November 2008

1.	(Spain) Rafael Nadal	$6,773,773
2.	(Switzerland) Roger Federer	$5,886,879
3.	(Serbia) Novak Djokovic	$5,689,077
4.	(United Kingdom) Andy Murray	$3,705,648
5.	(Russia) Nikolay Davydenko	$2,317,082
6.	(France) Jo-Wilfried Tsonga	$1,695,138
7.	(France) Gilles Simon	$1,425,489
8.	(United States) Andy Roddick	$1,337,888
9.	(Argentina) Juan Martín del Potro	$1,322,497
10.	(Spain) David Ferrer	$1,170,008

== Retirements ==
Following is a list of notable players (winners of a main tour title, and/or part of the ATP rankings top 100 (singles) or top 50 (doubles) for at least one week) who announced their retirement from professional tennis, became inactive (after not playing for more than 52 weeks), or were permanently banned from playing, during the 2008 season:

- Hugo Armando (born on May 27, 1978, in Miami, United States) turned professional in 1997 and reached no. 100 in singles the week of August 6, 2001, the only week he was within the top 100. His sole title and finals appearance came in doubles at the 2007 Delray Beach International Tennis Championships where he won with Xavier Malisse.
- Jonas Björkman (born 23 March 1972 in Alvesta, Sweden) turned professional in 1991 and became world no. 4 in singles and world no. 1 in doubles. He won three Australian Open doubles titles, two French Open doubles titles, three Wimbledon doubles titles, and one US Open doubles title, in addition to being a doubles finalist in six Grand Slam tournaments. He also won two doubles year-end championships. He retired from professional tennis after competing at the 2008 Tennis Masters Cup Doubles championships.
- Daniel Elsner (born 4 January 1979 in Memmingerberg, Germany) turned professional in 1997 and reached no. 92 in singles in October 2000. He retired from professional tennis in October 2008 after competing at the ITF tournament in Croatia.
- Gustavo Kuerten (born September 10, 1976, in Florianópolis, Brazil) turned professional in 1995. He reached the world no. 1 ranking, won the French Open three times (1997, 2000, and 2001), and was the Tennis Masters Cup champion in 2000. He played his last match against Paul-Henri Mathieu at the French Open.
- Félix Mantilla (September 23, 1974, in Barcelona, Spain) He turned professional in 1993 and reached a career-high ranking of world no. 10. He reached the semifinals of the French Open and the quarterfinals of the Australian Open and earned 10 career titles. He played his last career match in July 2007 in Umag against Robin Haase.
- Martin Verkerk (born 31 October 1978 in Leiderdorp, Netherlands) turned professional in 1996 and became world no. 14 in singles in September 2003. He won two singles titles and reached the final of the French Open. He retired from professional tennis after competing at the Open Tarragona Costa Daurada.

== See also ==
- ATP Entry Ranking
- 2008 in tennis
- 2008 WTA Tour
- ATP International Series Gold
- ATP International Series
- Tennis statistics
- ATP rankings
