= 2008 Mutua Madrileña Masters Madrid =

- Date: 13–19 October
- Edition: 7th
- Category: Masters Series
- Surface: Hard / indoor
- Location: Madrid, Spain
- Venue: Madrid Arena

Champions

Singles
- (United Kingdom) Andy Murray

Doubles
- (Poland) Mariusz Fyrstenberg / (Poland) Marcin Matkowski
- Madrid Open

The 2008 Madrid Masters (also known as the Mutua Madrileña Masters Madrid for sponsorship reasons) was a tennis tournament played on indoor hard courts. It was the 7th edition of the Madrid Masters, and was part of the ATP Masters Series of the 2008 ATP Tour. It took place at the Madrid Arena in Madrid, Spain, from 13 October through 19 October 2008. Fourth-seeded Andy Murray won the singles title.

The singles field was led by World No. 1, Beijing Olympics singles gold medalist, French Open and Wimbledon, Monte Carlo, Hamburg, Toronto Masters champion Rafael Nadal, ATP No. 2, US Open titlist, Olympic doubles gold medalist, Madrid defending finalist Roger Federer, and Australian Open, Indian Wells, Rome Masters winner Novak Djokovic. Other top seeds were US Open runner-up, Cincinnati Masters titlist Andy Murray, Miami Masters, Pörtschach, Warsaw winner Nikolay Davydenko, David Ferrer, David Nalbandian and Andy Roddick.

== Finals ==
=== Singles ===
(United Kingdom) Andy Murray defeated (France) Gilles Simon 6–4, 7–6^{(8–6)}

- It was Andy Murray's 4th title of the year, and his 7th overall. It was his 2nd Masters title of the year, and overall.

=== Doubles ===
(Poland) Mariusz Fyrstenberg / (Poland) Marcin Matkowski defeated (India) Mahesh Bhupathi / (The Bahamas) Mark Knowles 6–4, 6–2
