= 2009 Gerry Weber Open =

- Date: 6–14 June
- Edition: 17th
- Category: ATP World Tour 250
- Draw: 32S / 16D
- Prize money: €663,750
- Surface: Grass / outdoor
- Location: Halle, Germany
- Venue: Gerry Weber Stadion

Champions

Singles
- (Germany) Tommy Haas

Doubles
- (Germany) Christopher Kas / (Germany) Philipp Kohlschreiber
← 2008 ·	Gerry Weber Open	· 2010 →

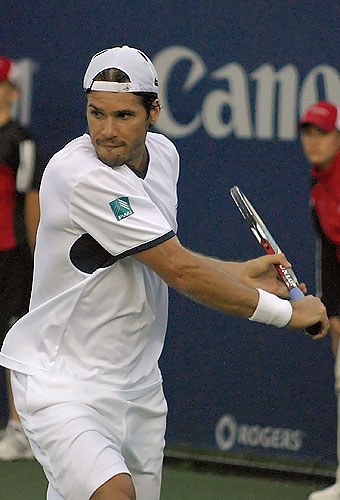
Former World No. 2 Tommy Haas won his first title since February 2007 over Novak Djokovic in the final

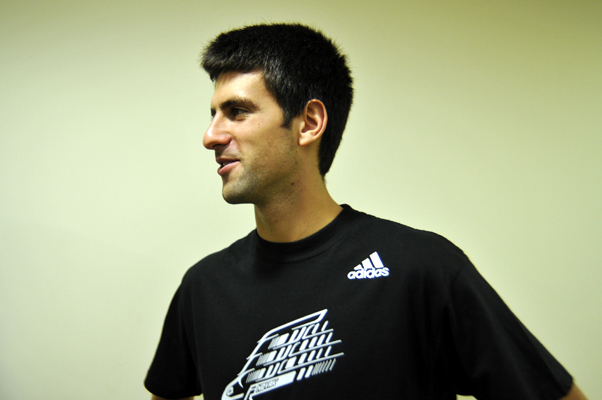
2008 Queen's Club runner-up Novak Djokovic lost his second career final on grass

The 2009 Gerry Weber Open was a men's tennis tournament played on outdoor grass courts. It was the 17th edition of the event known that year as the Gerry Weber Open, and was part of the ATP World Tour 250 series of the 2009 ATP World Tour. It took place at the Gerry Weber Stadion in Halle, North Rhine-Westphalia, Germany, from 6 June through 14 June 2009.

The singles draw featured Miami, Monte Carlo and Rome finalist, Dubai and Belgrade titlist Novak Djokovic and 2008 Davis Cup winner, Brisbane runner-up Fernando Verdasco. Also seeded were Johannesburg and Marseille winner Jo-Wilfried Tsonga, Munich champion Tomáš Berdych, Dmitry Tursunov, Jürgen Melzer and Rainer Schüttler. Association of Tennis Professionals (ATP) No. 2 Roger Federer, reigning US Open champion, winner of the Madrid Open and runner-up in the 2009 Australian Open, was initially in the draw as the top seed, but pulled out before playing a match, citing fatigue after winning the French Open the previous week.

The doubles draw was led by 2009 French Open champions, US Open, Rotterdam, and 2008 Halle finalists Lukáš Dlouhý and Leander Paes. Also present were Acapulco winners František Čermák and Michal Mertiňák, Martin Damm and Robert Lindstedt, and Philipp Petzschner and Alexander Peya.

The singles event was won by German Tommy Haas, who had earned a wildcard entry into the main draw, over Djokovic in three sets. The doubles were won by the unseeded German pair of Christopher Kas and Philipp Kohlschreiber in straight sets over the wildcard pair of German Andreas Beck and Swiss Marco Chiudinelli.

== Finals ==
=== Singles ===
(Germany) Tommy Haas defeated (Serbia) Novak Djokovic, 6–3, 6–7^{(4–7)}, 6–1

- It was Haas' first title of the year and 12th of his career.

=== Doubles ===
(Germany) Christopher Kas / (Germany) Philipp Kohlschreiber defeated (Germany) Andreas Beck / (Switzerland) Marco Chiudinelli, 6–3, 6–4

== Entrants ==
=== Seeds ===
Player	Nationality	Ranking*	Seeding
Roger Federer	Switzerland	2	1
Novak Djokovic	Serbia	4	2
Fernando Verdasco	Spain	8	3
Jo-Wilfried Tsonga	France	9	4
Tomáš Berdych	Czech Republic	20	5
Dmitry Tursunov	Russia	23	6
Jürgen Melzer	Austria	26	7
Rainer Schüttler	Germany	29	8

- Seedings are based on the rankings of May 25, 2009.

=== Other entrants ===
The following players received wildcards into the main draw:

- (Germany) Tommy Haas
- (Germany) Mischa Zverev
- (Germany) Benjamin Becker

The following players received entry from the qualifying draw:

- (Belgium) Olivier Rochus
- (Israel) Harel Levy
- (Australia) Joseph Sirianni
- (Spain) Fernando Vicente
