= 2009 Gerry Weber Open – Singles =

Singles
- 2009 Gerry Weber Open

Final
- Champion: (Germany) Tommy Haas
- Runner-up: (Serbia) Novak Djokovic
- Score: 6–3, 6–7^{(4–7)}, 6–1

Details
- Draw: 32
- Seeds: 8

Events
Singles	Doubles
- Gerry Weber Open

Roger Federer was the defending champion, but withdrew due to fatigue, after winning the 2009 French Open.

Tommy Haas won in the final 6–3, 6–7^{(4–7)}, 6–1, against Novak Djokovic.

== Seeds ==
1. (Switzerland) Roger Federer (withdrew due to fatigue)
2. (Serbia) Novak Djokovic (final)
3. (Spain) Fernando Verdasco (first round)
4. (France) Jo-Wilfried Tsonga (second round)
5. (Czech Republic) Tomáš Berdych (second round)
6. (Russia) Dmitry Tursunov (second round)
7. (Austria) Jürgen Melzer (quarterfinals)
8. (Germany) Rainer Schüttler (second round)

== Draw ==
Key

- Q = Qualifier
- WC = Wild card
- LL = Lucky loser
- Alt = Alternate
- ITF = ITF entry
- PR = Protected ranking
- SR = Special ranking
- SE = Special exempt
- JE = Junior exempt
- JR = Junior Accelerator Programme entrant
- CO = College Accelerator Programme entrant
- NG = Next Gen Accelerator Program entrant
- w/o = Walkover
- r = Retired
- d = Defaulted

=== Finals ===
Semifinals
(Germany) Philipp Kohlschreiber	6	6^{5}	6^{3}
WC	(Germany) Tommy Haas	2	7^{7}	7^{7}
Q	(Belgium) Olivier Rochus	6^{7}	4
2	(Serbia) Novak Djokovic	7^{9}	6

Final
WC	(Germany) Tommy Haas	6	6^{4}	6
2	(Serbia) Novak Djokovic	3	7^{7}	1

=== Top half ===
First round
LL	(Slovakia) L Lacko	7^{8}	6
Q	(Israel) H Levy	6^{6}	2
(Belgium) C Rochus	3	1
(Germany) A Beck	6	6
(Germany) P Kohlschreiber	6	6
(Germany) B Phau	4	2
(Russia) I Kunitsyn	5	4
6	(Russia) D Tursunov	7	6
4	(France) J-W Tsonga	7	6
(France) F Santoro	5	2
WC	(Germany) T Haas	6	6
(Austria) S Koubek	2	2
Q	(Australia) J Sirianni	2	4
WC	(Germany) M Zverev	6	6
(Czech Republic) J Hernych	4	5
5	(Czech Republic) T Berdych	6	7

Second round
LL	(Slovakia) L Lacko	5	6^{5}
(Germany) A Beck	7	7^{7}
(Germany) P Kohlschreiber	6	7^{8}
6	(Russia) D Tursunov	4	6^{6}
4	(France) J-W Tsonga	3	6^{3}
WC	(Germany) T Haas	6	7^{7}
WC	(Germany) M Zverev	3	6	7^{10}
5	(Czech Republic) T Berdych	6	2	6^{8}

Quarterfinals
(Germany) A Beck	6	3	3
(Germany) P Kohlschreiber	3	6	6
WC	(Germany) T Haas	7^{7}	6
WC	(Germany) M Zverev	6^{5}	2

Semifinals
(Germany) P Kohlschreiber	6	6^{5}	6^{3}
WC	(Germany) T Haas	2	7^{7}	7^{7}

=== Bottom half ===
First round
8	(Germany) R Schüttler	6	6
(France) M Gicquel	3	4
(Romania) V Hănescu	4	4
WC	(Germany) B Becker	6	6
Q	(Spain) F Vicente	0	0
Q	(Belgium) O Rochus	6	6
(Germany) P Petzschner	3	7^{7}	6
3	(Spain) F Verdasco	6	6^{5}	4
7	(Austria) J Melzer	1	6	6
(France) A Clément	6	3	2
(Serbia) V Troicki	2	1
(Germany) N Kiefer	6	6
(France) F Serra	1	6	6
(Israel) D Sela	6	4	2
(Italy) S Bolelli	5	2
2	(Serbia) N Djokovic	7	6

Second round
8	(Germany) R Schüttler	4	6	4
WC	(Germany) B Becker	6	2	6
Q	(Belgium) O Rochus	5	7	6
(Germany) P Petzschner	7	5	2
7	(Austria) J Melzer	6
(Germany) N Kiefer	1	r
(France) F Serra	7	5	1
2	(Serbia) N Djokovic	5	7	6

Quarterfinals
WC	(Germany) B Becker	7^{7}	3	3
Q	(Belgium) O Rochus	6^{4}	6	6
7	(Austria) J Melzer	1	4
2	(Serbia) N Djokovic	6	6

Semifinals
Q	(Belgium) O Rochus	6^{7}	4
2	(Serbia) N Djokovic	7^{9}	6
