= 2008 Open 13 =

- Date: 11–17 February
- Edition: 16th
- Category: International Series
- Draw: 32S / 16D
- Prize money: €513,000
- Surface: Hard / indoor
- Location: Marseille, France

Champions

Singles
- (United Kingdom) Andy Murray

Doubles
- (Czech Republic) Martin Damm / (Czech Republic) Pavel Vízner
- Open 13

The 2008 Open 13 was a men's tennis tournament played on indoor hard courts. It was the 16th edition of the Open 13, and was part of the International Series of the 2008 ATP Tour. It took place at the Palais des Sports in Marseille, France, from 11 February through 17 February 2008.

The field featured World No. 3 and Australian Open champion Novak Djokovic, ATP No. 7 and 2007 Paris Masters semifinalist Richard Gasquet, and ATP No. 8 and Australian Open quarterfinalist Mikhail Youzhny. Among other top players were Doha titlist Andy Murray, Auckland runner-up Juan Carlos Ferrero, Marcos Baghdatis, Jo-Wilfried Tsonga and Paul-Henri Mathieu.

== Finals ==
=== Singles ===
(United Kingdom) Andy Murray defeated (Croatia) Mario Ančić, 6–3, 6–4

- It was Murray's 2nd title of the year, and his 5th overall.

=== Doubles ===
(Czech Republic) Martin Damm / (Czech Republic) Pavel Vízner defeated (Switzerland) Yves Allegro / (South Africa) Jeff Coetzee, 7–6^{(7–0)}, 7–5
