= 2008 Italian Open (tennis) =

- Date: 5–11 May (ATP); 12 –18 May (WTA)
- Edition: 65th
- Category: Masters Series (ATP); Tier I Series (WTA)
- Surface: Clay / outdoor
- Location: Rome, Italy
- Venue: Foro Italico

Champions

Men's singles
- (Serbia) Novak Djokovic

Women's singles
- (Serbia) Jelena Janković

Men's doubles
- (United States) Bob Bryan / (United States) Mike Bryan

Women's doubles
- (Chinese Taipei) Chan Yung-jan / (Chinese Taipei) Chuang Chia-jung
← 2007 ·	Italian Open	· 2009 →

The 2008 Italian Open (also known as 2008 Rome Masters and the Internazionali BNL d'Italia for sponsorship reasons) was a tennis tournament played on outdoor clay courts. It was the 65th edition of the Rome Masters, and was part of the ATP Masters Series of the 2008 ATP Tour, and of the Tier I Series of the 2008 WTA Tour. Both the men's and the women's events took place at the Foro Italico in Rome, Italy, with the men playing from 5 May through 11 May 2008, and the women from 12 May through 18 May 2008.

The men's field featured world No. 1 and Monte-Carlo Masters runner-up Roger Federer, defending champion, Monte Carlo and Barcelona winner Rafael Nadal, and Australian Open champion Novak Djokovic. Others top seeds competing were Miami Masters champion Nikolay Davydenko, Valencia Open winner David Ferrer, Andy Roddick, David Nalbandian, and James Blake.

The women's draw was headlined by WTA No. 2 and Indian Wells champion Ana Ivanovic, Australian Open winner Maria Sharapova, and Indian Wells finalist Svetlana Kuznetsova. Other notable names in the field were defending champion Jelena Janković, Miami and Charleston winner Serena Williams, Anna Chakvetadze, Venus Williams, and Marion Bartoli.

== Review ==
=== Men ===
Third seed Novak Djokovic overcame a number of upsets to his fellow top seeds to win his fourth ATP Masters Series title. He beat the unseeded Stanislas Wawrinka in the final, who was aiming to become the second unseeded champion in Rome in the Open Era, and the first Swiss to win the title here.

The tournament was notable for its semifinals, where both Radek Štěpánek and Andy Roddick retired before the completion of their matches. It was the first time this situation had happened at a Masters Series event in ATP history. The two matches combined lasted a mere forty-nine minutes, and fans in attendance were refunded with 50% off tickets for the following week's women's tournament.

The big story at the beginning of the week was Rafael Nadal's shock second round loss to Juan Carlos Ferrero, his second defeat in one-hundred-and-five matches on clay. Nadal was trying to win his third tournament in three weeks. He had earlier complained about the ATP schedule, saying it was "impossible" for the players to maintain their best level at all four of the European clay tournaments back-to-back.

Bob Bryan and Mike Bryan won the doubles title, beating Daniel Nestor and Nenad Zimonjić in the championships match.

=== Women ===
Jelena Janković successfully defended a title for the first time in her career with a straight set victory over qualifier Alizé Cornet in the final. Cornet was the first female qualifier to reach the final at this tournament in the Open Era. She defeated two Top Ten players, Svetlana Kuznetsova and Anna Chakvetadze to reach the biggest final of her career so far.

Like the men's event, the later stages of the women's tournament were hit by two high-profile withdrawals. Serena Williams withdrew before her quarterfinal match with Cornet due to a back injury, and new world No. 1, Maria Sharapova, withdrew before her semifinal match with Janković due to a left calf injury.

Tsvetana Pironkova caused the biggest shock of the tournament in the second round, beating top-seeded and WTA No. 3, Ana Ivanovic, for her second career Top Ten victory. She eventually made her first ever Tier I quarterfinal, benefitting from Victoria Azarenka's retirement in the third round, before losing to Chakvetadze in three sets.

The doubles title was won by Taiwanese pairing Chan Yung-jan and Chuang Chia-jung, after they beat Iveta Benešová and Janette Husárová in straight sets to win their first ever Tier I title as a team.

== Finals ==
=== Men's singles ===
(Serbia) Novak Djokovic defeated (Switzerland) Stanislas Wawrinka 4–6, 6–3, 6–3

- It was Novak Djokovic's 3rd title of the year, and his 10th overall. It was his 2nd Masters title of the year, and his 4th overall.

=== Women's singles ===
(Serbia) Jelena Janković defeated (France) Alizé Cornet 6–2, 6–2

- It was Jelena Janković's 1st title of the year, and her 6th overall. It was her 1st Tier I title of the year, her 3rd overall, and her 2nd consecutive win at the event.

=== Men's doubles ===
(United States) Bob Bryan / (United States) Mike Bryan defeated (Canada) Daniel Nestor / (Serbia) Nenad Zimonjić 3–6, 6–4, [10–8]

=== Women's doubles ===
(Chinese Taipei) Chan Yung-jan / (Chinese Taipei) Chuang Chia-jung defeated (Czech Republic) Iveta Benešová / (Slovakia) Janette Husárová 7–6 (7–5), 6–3
