= 2008 Open 13 – Singles =

Singles
- 2008 Open 13

Final
- Champion: (United Kingdom) Andy Murray
- Runner-up: (Croatia) Mario Ančić
- Score: 6–3, 6–4

Details
- Draw: 32 (4Q / 3WC)
- Seeds: 8

Events
Singles	Doubles
← 2007 ·	Open 13	· 2009 →

Gilles Simon was the defending champion, but lost in the quarterfinals to Paul-Henri Mathieu.

Fourth-seeded Andy Murray won in the final 6–3, 6–4, against unseeded Mario Ančić.

== Seeds ==
1. (Serbia) Novak Djokovic (second round)
2. (France) Richard Gasquet (second round)
3. (Russia) Mikhail Youzhny (quarterfinals)
4. (United Kingdom) Andy Murray (champion)
5. (Spain) Juan Carlos Ferrero (second round)
6. (Cyprus) Marcos Baghdatis (semifinals)
7. (France) Jo-Wilfried Tsonga (first round)
8. (France) Paul-Henri Mathieu (semifinals)

== Draw ==
=== Key ===
- Q = Qualifier
- WC = Wild card
- LL = Lucky loser
- Alt = Alternate
- SE = Special exempt
- PR = Protected ranking
- ITF = ITF entry
- JE = Junior exempt
- w/o = Walkover
- r = Retired
- d = Defaulted
- SR = Special ranking

=== Finals ===
Semifinals
8	(France) Paul-Henri Mathieu	2	2
4	(United Kingdom) Andy Murray	6	6
6	(Cyprus) Marcos Baghdatis	4	2
WC	(Croatia) Mario Ančić	6	6

Final
4	(United Kingdom) Andy Murray	6	6
WC	(Croatia) Mario Ančić	3	4

=== Top half ===
First round
1	(Serbia) N Djokovic	6	6
Q	(Croatia) I Dodig	1	4
WC	(France) D Guez	2	4
(France) G Simon	6	6
WC	(France) M Llodra	6	7^{7}
(Italy) A Seppi	2	6^{5}
(France) M Giquel	6^{7}	6^{4}
8	(France) P-H Mathieu	7^{9}	7^{7}
4	(United Kingdom) A Murray	6	6
Q	(Netherlands) J Huta Galung	4	4
(Switzerland) S Wawrinka	3	6	6
(France) S Grosjean	6	4	4
(France) N Mahut	6	6
Q	(Russia) M Elgin	3	3
(South Korea) H-t Lee	4	1
5	(Spain) JC Ferrero	6	6

Second round
1	(Serbia) N Djokovic	2	7^{8}	3
(France) G Simon	6	6^{6}	6
(France) M Llodra	6^{4}	6^{5}
8	(France) P-H Mathieu	7^{7}	7^{7}
4	(United Kingdom) A Murray	3	7^{7}	6
(Switzerland) S Wawrinka	6	6^{5}	1
(France) N Mahut	5	6	7^{7}
5	(Spain) JC Ferrero	7	4	6^{1}

Quarterfinals
(France) G Simon	3	4
8	(France) P-H Mathieu	6	6
4	(United Kingdom) A Murray	7	7^{7}
(France) N Mahut	5	6^{5}

Semifinals
8	(France) P-H Mathieu	2	2
4	(United Kingdom) A Murray	6	6

=== Bottom half ===
First round
6	(Cyprus) M Baghdatis	6	6
(France) A Clément	3	4
(Spain) F López	7^{10}	5	6^{4}
(Croatia) I Karlović	6^{8}	7	7^{7}
(France) J Benneteau	6	1
(Romania) A Pavel	2	0^{r}
(Croatia) M Čilić	4	6^{3}
3	(Russia) M Youzhny	6	7^{7}
7	(France) J-W Tsonga	5	6^{3}
WC	(Croatia) M Ančić	7	7^{7}
(Germany) M Berrer	6^{5}	4
Q	(Russia) T Gabashvili	7^{7}	6
(Finland) J Nieminen	3	7	5
(Sweden) R Söderling	6	5	7
(Italy) S Bolelli	3	3
2	(France) R Gasquet	6	6

Second round
6	(Cyprus) M Baghdatis	6	6
(Croatia) I Karlović	4	4
(France) J Benneteau	5	3
3	(Russia) M Youzhny	7	6
WC	(Croatia) M Ančić	6	6
Q	(Russia) T Gabashvili	3	2
(Sweden) R Söderling	4	6	6
2	(France) R Gasquet	6	3	2

Quarterfinals
6	(Cyprus) M Baghdatis	7^{7}	6
3	(Russia) M Youzhny	6^{2}	3
WC	(Croatia) M Ančić	6	6^{4}	6
(Sweden) R Söderling	3	7^{7}	2

Semifinals
6	(Cyprus) M Baghdatis	4	2
WC	(Croatia) M Ančić	6	6
