= 2008 Open 13 – Doubles =

Doubles
- 2008 Open 13

Final
- Champions: (Czech Republic) Martin Damm; (Czech Republic) Pavel Vízner
- Runners-up: (Switzerland) Yves Allegro; (South Africa) Jeff Coetzee
- Score: 7–6^{(7–0)}, 7–5

Events
Singles	Doubles
← 2007 ·	Open 13	· 2009 →

Arnaud Clément and Michaël Llodra were the defending champions; however, they withdrew to due a left ankle injury for Clément.

Martin Damm and Pavel Vízner won in the final 7–6^{(7–0)}, 7–5, against Yves Allegro and Jeff Coetzee.

== Seeds ==
1. (Sweden) Simon Aspelin / (Austria) Julian Knowle (semifinals)
2. (Israel) Jonathan Erlich / (Israel) Andy Ram (withdrew due to personal reasons)
3. (Czech Republic) Martin Damm / (Czech Republic) Pavel Vízner (champions)
4. (France) Arnaud Clément / (France) Michaël Llodra (withdrew due to a left ankle injury for Clément)

== Draw ==
=== Key ===
- Q = Qualifier
- WC = Wild card
- LL = Lucky loser
- Alt = Alternate
- SE = Special exempt
- PR = Protected ranking
- ITF = ITF entry
- JE = Junior exempt
- w/o = Walkover
- r = Retired
- d = Defaulted
- SR = Special ranking

=== Draw ===
First round

Quarterfinals

Semifinals

Final

1
- (Sweden) S Aspelin
- (Austria) J Knowle
6
6

- (Cyprus) M Baghdatis
- (France) M Gicquel
1
1

1
- (Sweden) S Aspelin
- (Austria) J Knowle
6
6

- (Croatia) M Čilić
- (France) G Simon
6
3
[10]

- (Croatia) M Čilić
- (France) G Simon
3
4

WC
- (Croatia) M Ančić
- (France) S Grosjean
4
6
[6]

1
- (Sweden) S Aspelin
- (Austria) J Knowle
6
6^{5}
[8]

3
- (Czech Republic) M Damm
- (Czech Republic) P Vízner
7^{7}
6

3
- (Czech Republic) M Damm
- (Czech Republic) P Vízner
4
7^{7}
[10]

- (Germany) C Kas
- (Netherlands) R Wassen
6^{2}
4

3
- (Czech Republic) M Damm
- (Czech Republic) P Vízner
6
6

- (Poland) M Fyrstenberg
- (Poland) M Matkowski
7
6

- (Poland) M Fyrstenberg
- (Poland) M Matkowski
3
4

- (Croatia) I Karlović
- (Croatia) L Zovko
5
4

3
- (Czech Republic) M Damm
- (Czech Republic) P Vízner
7^{7}
7

- (Australia) J Kerr
- (Czech Republic) D Škoch
4
6
[6]

- (Switzerland) Y Allegro
- (South Africa) J Coetzee
6^{0}
5

- (Sweden) R Lindstedt
- (Finland) J Nieminen
6
2
[10]

- (Sweden) R Lindstedt
- (Finland) J Nieminen

- (France) J Benneteau
- (France) P-H Mathieu
6
6

- (France) J Benneteau
- (France) P-H Mathieu
w/o

ALT
- (France) D Guez
- (France) S de Chaunac
3
4

- (France) J Benneteau
- (France) P-H Mathieu
5
7
[6]

- (Switzerland) Y Allegro
- (South Africa) J Coetzee
6
7^{7}

- (Switzerland) Y Allegro
- (South Africa) J Coetzee
7
5
[10]

- (Australia) P Hanley
- (Canada) D Nestor
2
6^{5}

- (Switzerland) Y Allegro
- (South Africa) J Coetzee
6
6

WC
- (South Africa) C Haggard
- (France) N Mahut
6
3
[8]

ALT
- (Italy) S Bolelli
- (Italy) A Seppi
4
4

ALT
- (Italy) S Bolelli
- (Italy) A Seppi
4
6
[10]
