= 2008 Gerry Weber Open =

- Date: 7–15 June
- Edition: 16th
- Category: International Series
- Draw: 32S / 16D
- Prize money: € 692,000
- Surface: Grass / Outdoor
- Location: Halle, Germany
- Venue: Gerry Weber Stadion

Champions

Singles
- (Switzerland) Roger Federer

Doubles
- (Russia) Mikhail Youzhny / (Germany) Mischa Zverev
← 2007 ·	Gerry Weber Open	· 2009 →

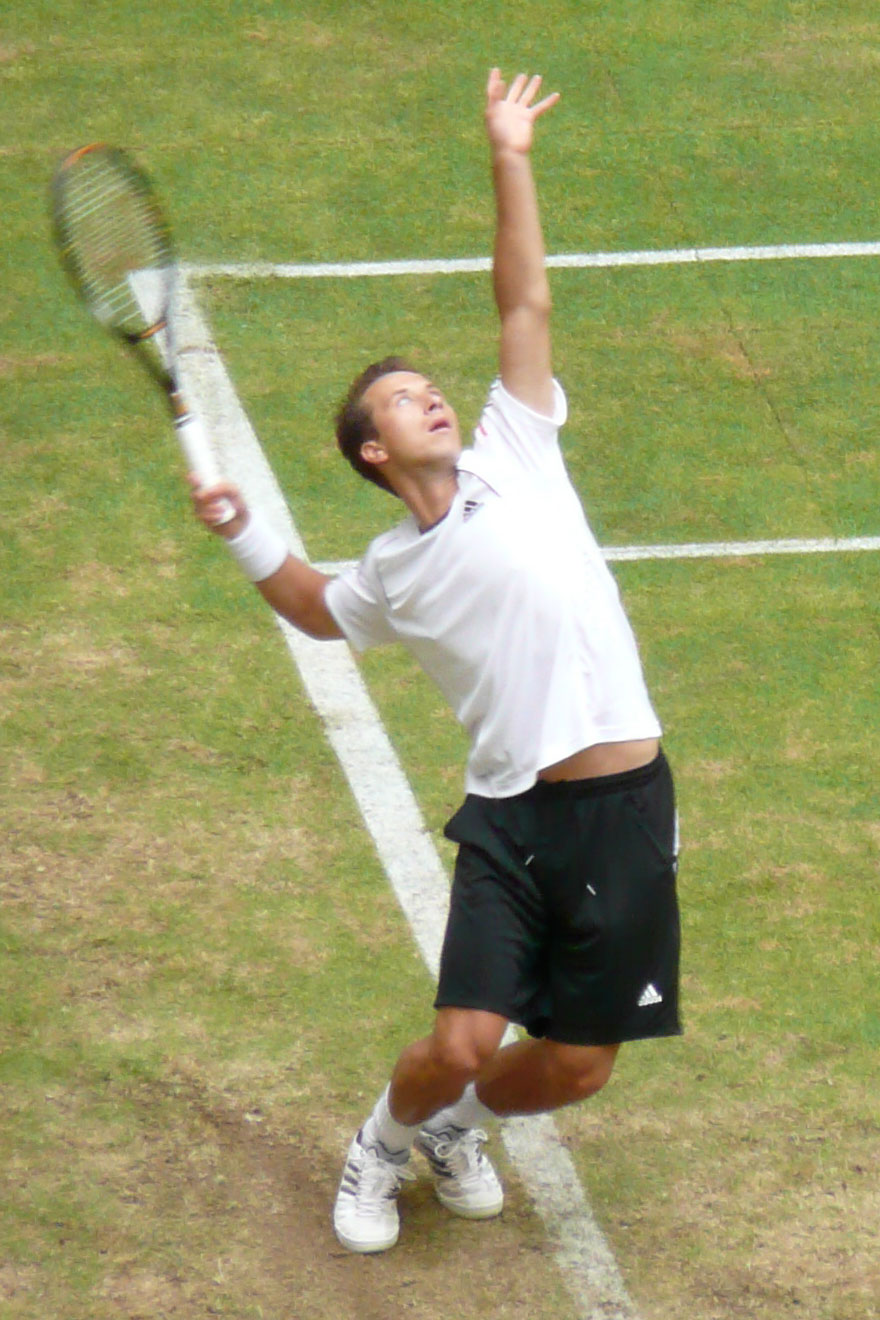
2008 Gerry Weber Open finalist Philipp Kohlschreiber

The 2008 Gerry Weber Open was a men's tennis tournament played on outdoor grass courts. It was the 16th edition of the Gerry Weber Open, and was part of the International Series of the 2008 ATP Tour. It took place at the Gerry Weber Stadion in Halle, North Rhine-Westphalia, Germany, from 7 June through 15 June 2008.

The singles draw featured World No. 1, French Open runner-up and 2003, 2004, 2005 and 2006 Halle champion Roger Federer, ATP No. 7, Delray Beach and Houston finalist James Blake, and defending champion Tomáš Berdych. Also present were Australian Open quarterfinalist and Chennai titlist Mikhail Youzhny, 2007 Halle runner-up Marcos Baghdatis, Radek Štěpánek, Jarkko Nieminen and Ivan Ljubičić.

First-seeded Roger Federer won his fifth singles title at the event.

== Finals ==
=== Singles ===
(Switzerland) Roger Federer defeated (Germany) Philipp Kohlschreiber, 6–3, 6–4

- It was Federer's 2nd title of the year, and the 55th of his career. It was his 5th win at the event, and one he accomplished without dropping serve once throughout the entire tournament.

=== Doubles ===
(Russia) Mikhail Youzhny / (Germany) Mischa Zverev defeated (Czech Republic) Lukáš Dlouhý / (India) Leander Paes, 3–6, 6–4, [10–3]

- It was Youzhny's first title of the year and the 8th of his career. It was Zverev's first career title.
