= 2008 Masters Series Monte-Carlo =

- Date: 19–27 April
- Edition: 102nd
- Category: ATP Masters Series
- Draw: 56S / 24D
- Prize money: $2,057,000
- Surface: Clay / outdoor
- Location: Roquebrune-Cap-Martin, France
- Venue: Monte Carlo Country Club

Champions

Singles
- (Spain) Rafael Nadal

Doubles
- (Spain) Rafael Nadal / (Spain) Tommy Robredo
← 2007 ·	Monte-Carlo Masters	· 2009 →

The 2008 Masters Series Monte-Carlo (also known as the Masters Series Monte-Carlo presented by ROLEX for sponsorship reasons) was a men's tennis tournament played on outdoor clay courts. It was the 102nd edition of the Monte Carlo Masters, and was part of the ATP Masters Series of the 2008 ATP Tour. It took place at the Monte Carlo Country Club in Roquebrune-Cap-Martin, France, near Monte Carlo, Monaco, from 19 April through 27 April 2008.

The men's field was headlined by World No. 1 and Estoril Open winner Roger Federer, Miami runner-up and defending champion Rafael Nadal, and Australian Open and Indian Wells titlist Novak Djokovic. Other notable names in the field were Miami Masters champion Nikolay Davydenko, Valencia Open winner David Ferrer, David Nalbandian, Richard Gasquet and Mikhail Youzhny.

== Notable stories ==
=== Nadal's achievements ===
Champion Rafael Nadal became the first man since Anthony Wilding in 1914 to win four consecutive titles in Monte Carlo, and was therefore the first man to do so in the Open Era. Nadal also won the doubles event, forming an unseeded team with Tommy Robredo. This made him only the second man in ATP Masters Series history to win both the singles and the doubles events of a tournament, in the same year. The last man to do so was Jim Courier, at the 1991 Indian Wells Super 9.

=== All top seeds in final rounds ===
For the second time only in ATP Masters Series history, the top four seeds (Roger Federer, Rafael Nadal, Novak Djokovic and Nikolay Davydenko) all reached the semifinals of the event. The last occurrence of this had taken place at the 1999 Cincinnati Super 9 event, with Pete Sampras, Patrick Rafter, Andre Agassi and Yevgeny Kafelnikov all reaching the final four.

== Finals ==
=== Singles ===
(Spain) Rafael Nadal defeated (Switzerland) Roger Federer, 7–5, 7–5

- It was Rafael Nadal's 1st title of the year, and his 24th overall. It was his 1st Masters title of the year, his 10th overall, and his 4th consecutive win at the event.

=== Doubles ===
(Spain) Rafael Nadal / (Spain) Tommy Robredo defeated (India) Mahesh Bhupathi / (The Bahamas) Mark Knowles, 6–3, 6–3
