= 2008 Pacific Life Open =

- Date: March 10–23
- Edition: 35th
- Category: Masters Series (ATP); Tier I Series (WTA)
- Prize money: $3,339,000
- Surface: Hard / outdoor
- Location: Indian Wells, California, US
- Venue: Indian Wells Tennis Garden

Champions

Men's singles
- (Serbia) Novak Djokovic

Women's singles
- (Serbia) Ana Ivanovic

Men's doubles
- (Israel) Jonathan Erlich / (Israel) Andy Ram

Women's doubles
- (Russia) Dinara Safina / (Russia) Elena Vesnina
← 2007 ·	Indian Wells Open	· 2009 →

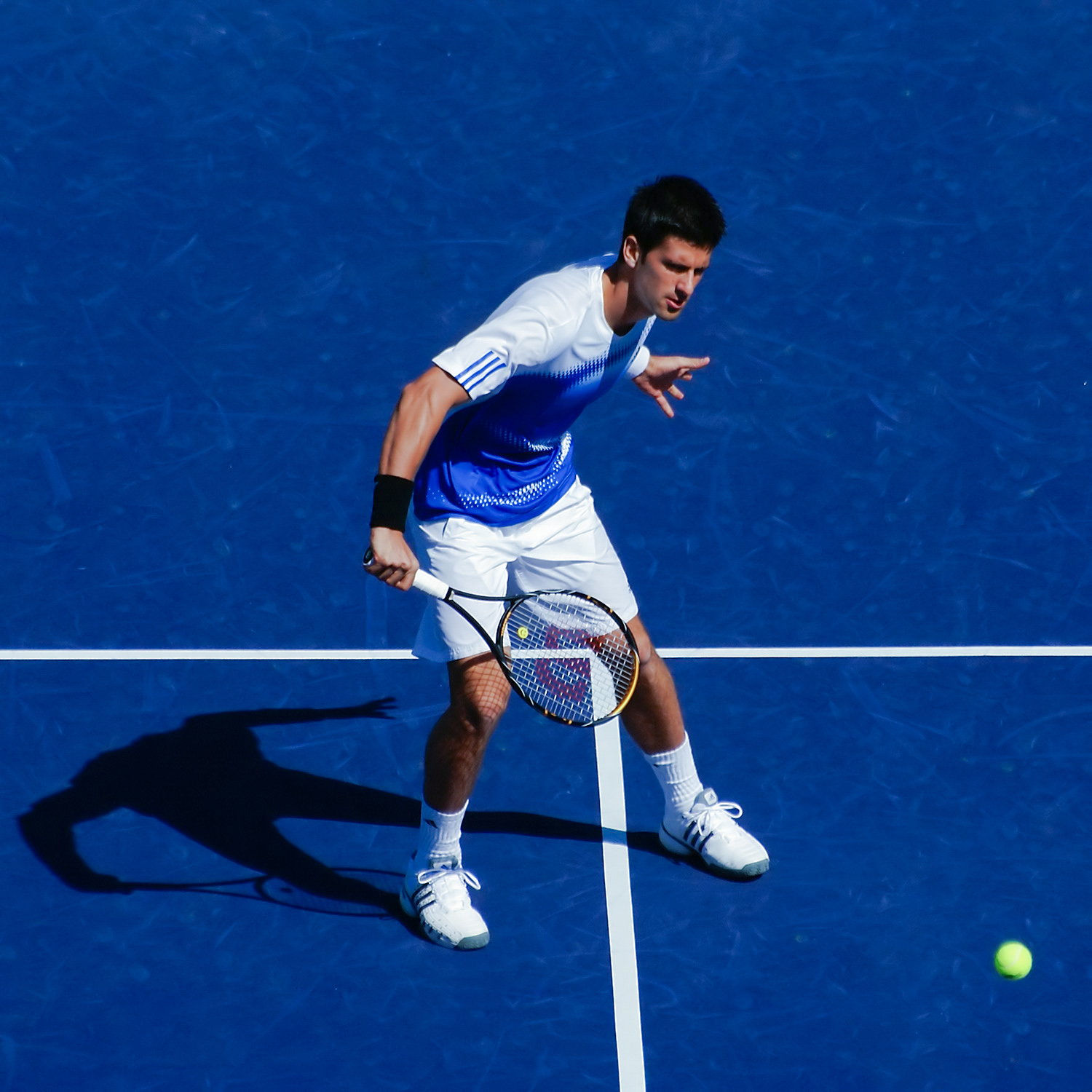
Men's singles champion Novak Djokovic.

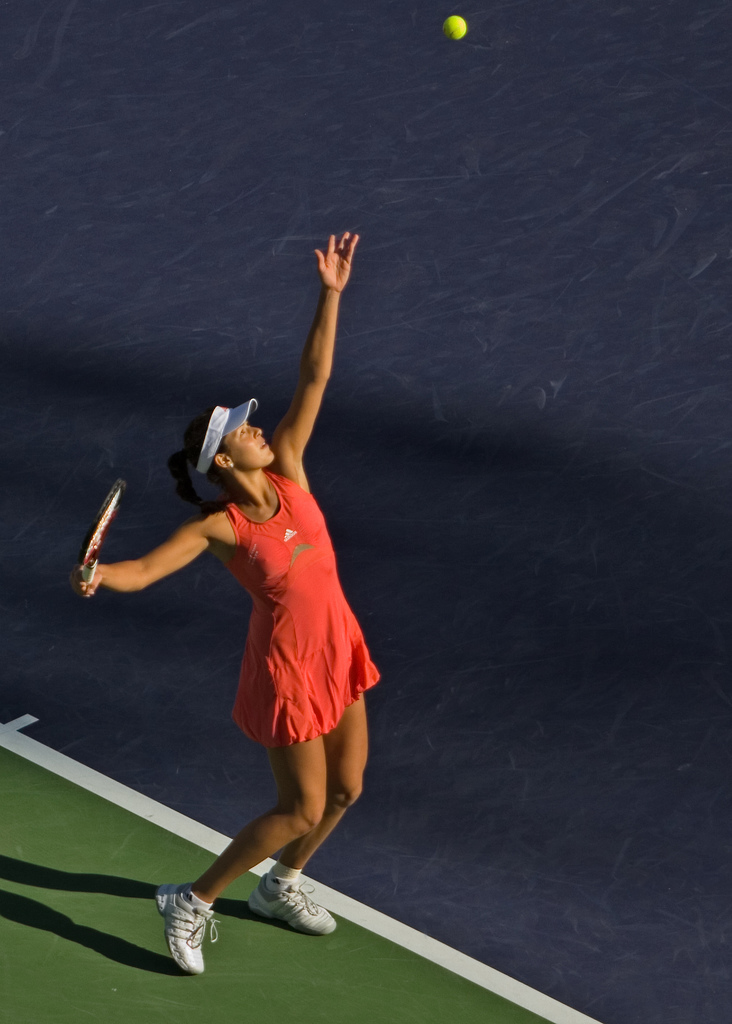
Women's singles champion Ana Ivanovic.

The 2008 Indian Wells Open (also known as the Pacific Life Open for sponsorship reasons) was a tennis tournament played on outdoor hard courts. It was the 35th edition of the Indian Wells Open, and was part of the ATP Masters Series of the 2008 ATP Tour, and of the Tier I Series of the 2008 WTA Tour. Both the men's and the women's events took place at the Indian Wells Tennis Garden in Indian Wells, California, United States, from March 10 through March 23, 2008.

The men's singles were headlined by the World No. 1, reigning Wimbledon and US Open champion and Masters Cup winner Roger Federer, the ATP No. 2, Chennai runner-up and the defending champion Rafael Nadal, and the Australian Open champion Novak Djokovic. Also competing in the field were the 2007 Moscow title holder Nikolay Davydenko, the Masters Cup finalist David Ferrer, Andy Roddick, David Nalbandian and Richard Gasquet.

The women's draw included the WTA No. 2 and the Australian Open runner-up Ana Ivanovic, the Sydney and Dubai finalist Svetlana Kuznetsova, and the Australian Open semifinalist Jelena Janković. Other top seeds present were the Tour Championships finalist and the Australian Open champion Maria Sharapova, the defending champion Daniela Hantuchová, Marion Bartoli, Nicole Vaidišová and Dinara Safina.

Serbians Novak Djokovic and Ana Ivanovic won the respective men's and women's singles titles. For Djokovic, it was his second title of the year, following his success at the Australian Open, whilst for Ivanovic, it was her first title of the year, but it would be her last Tier I/Premier title to date.

== Finals ==
=== Men's singles ===
(Serbia) Novak Djokovic defeated (United States) Mardy Fish, 6–2, 5–7, 6–3

- It was Djokovic's 2nd title of the year, and his 9th overall. It was his 1st Masters title of the year, and his 3rd overall.

=== Women's singles ===
(Serbia) Ana Ivanovic defeated (Russia) Svetlana Kuznetsova, 6–4, 6–3

- It was Ivanovic's 1st title of the year, and her 6th overall. It was her 3rd (and last) Tier I title overall.

=== Men's doubles ===
(Israel) Jonathan Erlich / (Israel) Andy Ram defeated (Canada) Daniel Nestor / (Serbia) Nenad Zimonjić, 6–4, 6–4

=== Women's doubles ===
(Russia) Dinara Safina / (Russia) Elena Vesnina defeated (China) Yan Zi / (China) Zheng Jie, 6–1, 1–6, [10–8]
