= 2007 Stuttgart Open =

2007 MercedesCup
- Date: 16–23 July
- Edition: 30th
- Category: International Series Gold
- Draw: 32S /16D
- Prize money: $732,000
- Surface: Clay / outdoor
- Location: Stuttgart, Germany
- Venue: Tennis Club Weissenhof

Champions

Singles
- (Spain) Rafael Nadal

Doubles
- (Czech Republic) František Čermák / (Czech Republic) Leoš Friedl
← 2006 ·	MercedesCup	· 2008 →

The 2007 Stuttgart Open (known for sponsorship reasons as the Mercedes Cup) was a men's tennis tournament played on outdoor clay courts. It was the 30th edition of the Mercedes Cup, and was part of the International Series Gold of the 2007 ATP Tour. It took place at the Tennis Club Weissenhof in Stuttgart, Germany, from 16 July through 23 July 2008.

Rafael Nadal won his fifth clay title of the year, and sixth title overall.

== Finals ==
=== Singles ===
(Spain) Rafael Nadal defeated (Switzerland) Stanislas Wawrinka 6–4, 7–5

=== Doubles ===
(Czech Republic) František Čermák / (Czech Republic) Leoš Friedl defeated (Spain) Guillermo García-López / (Spain) Fernando Verdasco 6–4, 6–4
