= 2024 BOSS Open =

- Date: 10–16 June
- Edition: 46th
- Category: ATP Tour 250
- Draw: 28S / 16D
- Prize money: €734,915
- Surface: Grass
- Location: Stuttgart, Germany
- Venue: Tennis Club Weissenhof

Champions

Singles
- (United Kingdom) Jack Draper

Doubles
- (Brazil) Rafael Matos / (Brazil) Marcelo Melo
← 2023 ·	Stuttgart Open	· 2025 →

The 2024 BOSS Open is a men's tennis tournament currently played on outdoor grass courts. It is the 46th edition of the Stuttgart Open, and part of the ATP Tour 250 series of the 2024 ATP Tour. It is held at the Tennis Club Weissenhof in Stuttgart, Germany, from 10 June until 16 June 2024.

== Champions ==
=== Singles ===
- (United Kingdom) Jack Draper def. (Italy) Matteo Berrettini 3–6, 7–6^{(7–5)}, 6–4

=== Doubles ===
- (Brazil) Rafael Matos / (Brazil) Marcelo Melo def. (United Kingdom) Julian Cash / (United States) Robert Galloway 3–6, 6–3, [10–8]

== Point distribution ==
Event	W	F	SF	QF	R16	R32	Q	Q2	Q1
Singles	250	165	100	50	25	0	13	7	0
Doubles	250	150	90	45	0	—	—	—	—

== Singles main draw entrants ==
=== Seeds ===
Country	Player	Rank	Seed
~~GER~~	~~Alexander Zverev~~	~~4~~	~~1~~
USA	Ben Shelton	15	2
KAZ	Alexander Bublik	17	3
USA	Frances Tiafoe	26	4
ITA	Lorenzo Musetti	30	5
GBR	Jack Draper	39	6
GER	Jan-Lennard Struff	41	7
	Roman Safiullin	42	8

- Rankings are as of 27 May 2024.

=== Other entrants ===
The following players received wildcards into the main draw:

- (Serbia) Hamad Medjedovic
- (Canada) Denis Shapovalov
- (Germany) Henri Squire

The following player received entry using a protected ranking:

- (Italy) Matteo Berrettini

The following players received entry from the qualifying draw:

- (Australia) James Duckworth
- (France) Pierre-Hugues Herbert
- (France) Matteo Martineau
- (France) Giovanni Mpetshi Perricard

The following player received entry as a lucky loser:

- (France) Richard Gasquet

=== Withdrawals ===
- (Italy) Matteo Arnaldi → replaced by (France) Arthur Rinderknech
- (United States) Taylor Fritz → replaced by (United Kingdom) Andy Murray
- (Hungary) Márton Fucsovics → replaced by (Italy) Flavio Cobolli
- (Poland) Hubert Hurkacz → replaced by (China) Zhang Zhizhen
- (Czech Republic) Jiří Lehečka → replaced by (United States) Brandon Nakashima
- (Czech Republic) Tomáš Macháč → replaced by (Italy) Matteo Berrettini
- (Germany) Alexander Zverev → replaced by (France) Richard Gasquet

== Doubles main draw entrants ==
=== Seeds ===
Country	Player	Country	Player	Rank	Seed
GER	Kevin Krawietz	GER	Tim Pütz	28	1
GBR	Neal Skupski	NZL	Michael Venus	38	2
GBR	Lloyd Glasspool	NED	Jean-Julien Rojer	63	3
URU	Ariel Behar	CZE	Adam Pavlásek	69	4

- Rankings are as of 27 May 2024.

=== Other entrants ===
The following pairs received wildcards into the doubles main draw:

- (Jamaica) Dustin Brown / (Austria) Sebastian Ofner
- (Germany) Benjamin Hassan / (Germany) Daniel Masur

=== Withdrawals ===
- (El Salvador) Marcelo Arévalo / (Croatia) Mate Pavić → replaced by (New Zealand) Marcus Daniell / (United States) Marcos Giron
- (Italy) Simone Bolelli / (Italy) Andrea Vavassori → replaced by (Germany) Constantin Frantzen / (Germany) Hendrik Jebens
- (India) Rohan Bopanna / (Australia) Matthew Ebden → replaced by (Germany) Yannick Hanfmann / (Germany) Dominik Koepfer
- (France) Sadio Doumbia / (France) Fabien Reboul → replaced by (France) Théo Arribagé / (France) Sadio Doumbia
- (Czech Republic) Tomáš Macháč / (China) Zhang Zhizhen → replaced by (Romania) Victor Vlad Cornea / (China) Zhang Zhizhen
