= 2010 MercedesCup =

- Date: 12–18 July
- Edition: 33rd
- Category: World Tour 250
- Draw: 28S / 16D
- Prize money: €398,250
- Surface: Clay
- Location: Stuttgart, Germany
- Venue: Tennis Club Weissenhof

Champions

Singles
- (Spain) Albert Montañés

Doubles
- (Argentina) Carlos Berlocq / (Argentina) Eduardo Schwank
- Stuttgart Open

The 2010 MercedesCup was a men's tennis tournament played on outdoor clay courts. It was the 32nd edition of the Stuttgart Open and was part of the ATP World Tour 250 series of the 2010 ATP World Tour. It was held at the Tennis Club Weissenhof in Stuttgart, Germany from 12 July until 18 July 2010. Fifth-seeded Albert Montañés won the singles title.

== Finals ==
=== Singles ===
(Spain) Albert Montañés defeated (France) Gaël Monfils, 6–2, 1–2, RET.

- It was Montañés' 2nd title of the year and 5th of his career.

=== Doubles ===
(Argentina) Carlos Berlocq / (Argentina) Eduardo Schwank defeated (Germany) Christopher Kas / (Germany) Philipp Petzschner 7–6^{(7–5)}, 7–6^{(7–6)}

== ATP entrants ==
=== Seeds ===
Player	Nationality	Ranking*	Seeding
Nikolay Davydenko	Russia	6	1
Jürgen Melzer	Austria	15	2
Gaël Monfils	France	17	3
Juan Carlos Ferrero	Spain	21	4
Albert Montañés	Spain	30	5
Philipp Kohlschreiber	Germany	32	6
Gilles Simon	France	34	7
Victor Hănescu	Romania	37	8

- Seedings are based on the rankings of July 5, 2010.

=== Other entrants ===
The following players received wildcards into the singles main draw

- (Jamaica) Dustin Brown
- (Germany) Björn Phau
- (Germany) Mischa Zverev

The following players received entry from the qualifying draw:

- (Spain) Pablo Andújar
- (Romania) Victor Crivoi
- (Germany) Bastian Knittel
- (Spain) Iván Navarro
