= 2023 BOSS Open =

- Date: 12–18 June
- Edition: 45th
- Category: ATP Tour 250
- Draw: 28S / 16D
- Prize money: €718,410
- Surface: Grass
- Location: Stuttgart, Germany
- Venue: Tennis Club Weissenhof

Champions

Singles
- (United States) Frances Tiafoe

Doubles
- (Croatia) Nikola Mektić / (Croatia) Mate Pavić
← 2022 ·	Stuttgart Open	· 2024 →

The 2023 BOSS Open was a men's tennis tournament played on outdoor grass courts. It was the 45th edition of the Stuttgart Open, and part of the ATP Tour 250 series of the 2023 ATP Tour. It was held at the Tennis Club Weissenhof in Stuttgart, Germany, from 12 June until 18 June 2023.

== Champions ==
=== Singles ===
- (United States) Frances Tiafoe def. (Germany) Jan-Lennard Struff, 4–6, 7–6^{(7–1)}, 7–6^{(10–8)}

=== Doubles ===
- (Croatia) Nikola Mektić / (Croatia) Mate Pavić def. (Germany) Kevin Krawietz / (Germany) Tim Pütz, 7–6^{(7–2)}, 6–3

== Point distribution ==
Event	W	F	SF	QF	Round of 16	Round of 32	Q	Q2	Q1
Singles	250	150	90	45	20	0	12	6	0
Doubles	250	150	90	45	0	—	—	—	—

== Singles main draw entrants ==
=== Seeds ===
Country	Player	Rank	Seed
GRE	Stefanos Tsitsipas	5	1
USA	Taylor Fritz	8	2
USA	Frances Tiafoe	12	3
POL	Hubert Hurkacz	14	4
USA	Tommy Paul	17	5
ITA	Lorenzo Musetti	18	6
ITA	Matteo Berrettini	20	7
AUS	Nick Kyrgios	26	8

- Rankings are as of 29 May 2023.

=== Other entrants ===
The following players received wildcards into the main draw:

- (Spain) Feliciano López
- (Germany) Oscar Otte
- (Greece) Stefanos Tsitsipas

The following players received entry from the qualifying draw:

- (United States) Christopher Eubanks
- (Hungary) Márton Fucsovics
- (Croatia) Borna Gojo
- (Japan) Yosuke Watanuki

=== Withdrawals ===
- (Spain) Alejandro Davidovich Fokina → replaced by (France) Corentin Moutet
- (United Kingdom) Jack Draper → replaced by (Australia) Christopher O'Connell
- (Bulgaria) Grigor Dimitrov → replaced by (Germany) Daniel Altmaier
- (Chile) Nicolás Jarry → replaced by (China) Zhang Zhizhen

== Doubles main draw entrants ==
=== Seeds ===
Country	Player	Country	Player	Rank	Seed
IND	Rohan Bopanna	AUS	Matthew Ebden	27	1
CRO	Nikola Mektić	CRO	Mate Pavić	28	2
MEX	Santiago González	FRA	Édouard Roger-Vasselin	36	3
GER	Kevin Krawietz	GER	Tim Pütz	50	4

- ^{1} Rankings are as of 29 May 2023.

=== Other entrants ===
The following pairs received wildcards into the doubles main draw:

- (Germany) Daniel Altmaier / (Jamaica) Dustin Brown
- (Germany) Oscar Otte / (Germany) Jan-Lennard Struff

=== Withdrawals ===
- (Colombia) Nicolás Barrientos / (Chile) Nicolás Jarry → replaced by (Monaco) Romain Arneodo / (France) Grégoire Barrère
- (United Kingdom) Julian Cash / (United Kingdom) Henry Patten → replaced by Aslan Karatsev / (Czech Republic) Jiří Lehečka
- (Croatia) Ivan Dodig / (United States) Austin Krajicek → replaced by (United States) William Blumberg / (United States) Frances Tiafoe
- (United States) Rajeev Ram / (United Kingdom) Joe Salisbury → replaced by (France) Albano Olivetti / (Spain) David Vega Hernández
