= 2011 MercedesCup =

- Date: 11–18 July
- Edition: 34th
- Category: World Tour 250
- Draw: 32S / 16D
- Prize money: €398,250
- Surface: Clay / outdoor
- Location: Stuttgart, Germany
- Venue: Tennis Club Weissenhof

Champions

Singles
- (Spain) Juan Carlos Ferrero

Doubles
- (Austria) Jürgen Melzer / (Germany) Philipp Petzschner
- Stuttgart Open

The 2011 MercedesCup was a men's tennis tournament played on outdoor clay courts. It was the 34th edition of the Stuttgart Open, and was part of the ATP World Tour 250 series of the 2011 ATP World Tour. It was held at the Tennis Club Weissenhof in Stuttgart, Germany, from July 11 through July 18, 2011. Unseeded Juan Carlos Ferrero won the singles title.

== Finals ==
=== Singles ===
(Spain) Juan Carlos Ferrero defeated (Spain) Pablo Andújar, 6–4, 6–0

- It was Ferrero's only title of the year and 16th and final title of his career.

=== Doubles ===
(Austria) Jürgen Melzer / (Germany) Philipp Petzschner defeated (Spain) Marcel Granollers / (Spain) Marc López, 6–3, 6–4

== ATP entrants ==
=== Seeds ===
Nationality	Player	Ranking*	Seeding
FRA	Gaël Monfils	7	1
AUT	Jürgen Melzer	12	2
RUS	Mikhail Youzhny	17	3
FRA	Gilles Simon	18	4
GER	Florian Mayer	20	5
RUS	Nikolay Davydenko	30	6
ITA	Andreas Seppi	36	7
ESP	Guillermo García-López	37	8

- Seedings are based on the rankings of July 4, 2011.

=== Other entrants ===
The following players received wildcards into the singles main draw:

- (Germany) Robin Kern
- (Poland) Łukasz Kubot
- (Germany) Cedrik-Marcel Stebe

The following players received entry from the qualifying draw:

- (Slovakia) Pavol Červenák
- (Romania) Victor Crivoi
- (Argentina) Federico del Bonis
- (Russia) Evgeny Donskoy

The following players received entry to the main draw as lucky loser:

- (Germany) Bastian Knittel
