= 2022 BOSS Open =

- Date: 6–12 June
- Edition: 44th
- Category: ATP Tour 250
- Draw: 28S / 16D
- Prize money: € 769,645
- Surface: Grass
- Location: Stuttgart, Germany
- Venue: Tennis Club Weissenhof

Champions

Singles
- (Italy) Matteo Berrettini

Doubles
- (Poland) Hubert Hurkacz / (Croatia) Mate Pavić
← 2021 ·	Stuttgart Open	· 2023 →

The 2022 BOSS Open was a men's tennis tournament played on outdoor grass courts. It was the 44th edition of the Stuttgart Open, and part of the ATP Tour 250 series of the 2022 ATP Tour. It was held at the Tennis Club Weissenhof in Stuttgart, Germany, from 6 June until 12 June 2022. Second-seed Matteo Berrettini won the singles title.

== Finals ==
=== Singles ===
- (Italy) Matteo Berrettini defeated (United Kingdom) Andy Murray 6–4, 5–7, 6–3

=== Doubles ===
- (Poland) Hubert Hurkacz / (Croatia) Mate Pavić defeated (Germany) Tim Pütz / (New Zealand) Michael Venus, 7–6^{(7–3)}, 7–6^{(7–5)}

== Points and prize money ==
=== Point distribution ===
Event	W	F	SF	QF	Round of 16	Round of 32	Q	Q2	Q1
Singles	250	150	90	45	20	0	12	6	0
Doubles	250	150	90	45	0	—	—	—	—

=== Prize money ===
Event	W	F	SF	QF	Round of 16	Round of 32	Q2	Q1
Singles	€53,280	€38,200	€27,195	€18,130	€11,660	€7,010	€3,425	€1,780
Doubles*	€19,880	€14,240	€9,390	€6,090	€3,580	—	—	—

_{*per team}

== ATP singles main draw entrants ==
=== Seeds ===
Country	Player	Rank^{1}	Seed
GRE	Stefanos Tsitsipas	4	1
ITA	Matteo Berrettini	10	2
POL	Hubert Hurkacz	13	3
CAN	Denis Shapovalov	15	4
GEO	Nikoloz Basilashvili	24	5
ITA	Lorenzo Sonego	35	6
KAZ	Alexander Bublik	42	7
FRA	Ugo Humbert	46	8

- ^{1} Rankings are as of 23 May 2022.

=== Other entrants ===
The following players received wildcards into the main draw:

- (Spain) Feliciano López
- (Germany) Jan-Lennard Struff
- (Greece) Stefanos Tsitsipas

The following players received entry from the qualifying draw:

- (Moldova) Radu Albot
- (Australia) Christopher O'Connell
- (Austria) Jurij Rodionov
- (Switzerland) Dominic Stricker

=== Withdrawals ===
Before the tournament

- (South Africa) Lloyd Harris → replaced by (Germany) Daniel Altmaier
- (United States) Sebastian Korda → replaced by (Portugal) João Sousa
- (United States) Reilly Opelka → replaced by (Czech Republic) Jiří Lehečka
- (Denmark) Holger Rune → replaced by (United States) Denis Kudla

== ATP doubles main draw entrants ==
=== Seeds ===
Country	Player	Country	Player	Rank^{1}	Seed
GER	Tim Pütz	NZL	Michael Venus	30	1
AUS	John Peers	SVK	Filip Polášek	31	2
POL	Hubert Hurkacz	CRO	Mate Pavić	39	3
FRA	Fabrice Martin	GER	Andreas Mies	77	4

- ^{1} Rankings are as of 23 May 2022.

=== Other entrants ===
The following pairs received wildcards into the doubles main draw:

- (Jamaica) Dustin Brown / (United States) Evan King
- (Greece) Petros Tsitsipas / (Greece) Stefanos Tsitsipas

=== Withdrawals ===
Before the tournament

- (Kazakhstan) Alexander Bublik / (Denmark) Holger Rune → replaced by (Kazakhstan) Alexander Bublik / (Australia) Nick Kyrgios
- (Mexico) Santiago González / (Argentina) Andrés Molteni → replaced by (Israel) Jonathan Erlich / Aslan Karatsev
- (Germany) Kevin Krawietz / (Germany) Andreas Mies → (France) Fabrice Martin / (Germany) Andreas Mies
- (Croatia) Nikola Mektić / (Croatia) Mate Pavić → replaced by (Poland) Hubert Hurkacz / (Croatia) Mate Pavić
