= 2000 Mercedes Cup =

- Date: 17–23 July
- Edition: 52nd
- Category: International Series Gold
- Draw: 32S / 16D
- Prize money: $900,000
- Surface: Clay / outdoor
- Location: Stuttgart, Germany
- Venue: Tennis Club Weissenhof

Champions

Singles
- (Argentina) Franco Squillari

Doubles
- (Czech Republic) Jiří Novák / (Czech Republic) David Rikl
- Stuttgart Open

The 2000 Mercedes Cup was a men's tennis tournament played on outdoor clay courts at the Tennis Club Weissenhof in Stuttgart, Germany that was part of the International Series Gold of the 2000 ATP Tour. It was the 52nd edition of the tournament and was held from 17 July until 23 July 2000. Fifth-seeded Franco Squillari won the singles title.

== Finals ==
=== Singles ===
(Argentina) Franco Squillari defeated (Argentina) Gastón Gaudio 6–2, 3–6, 4–6, 6–4, 6–2

- It was Squillari's 2nd singles title of the year and the 3rd of his career.

=== Doubles ===
(Czech Republic) Jiří Novák / (Czech Republic) David Rikl defeated (Argentina) Lucas Arnold Ker / (United States) Donald Johnson 5–7, 6–2, 6–3

- It was Novák's 3rd title of the year and the 12th of his career. It was Rikl's 3rd title of the year and the 18th of his career.
