= 2012 MercedesCup =

- Date: 7–15 July
- Edition: 35th
- Category: World Tour 250
- Draw: 28S / 16D
- Prize money: €358,425
- Surface: Clay / outdoor
- Location: Stuttgart, Germany
- Venue: Tennis Club Weissenhof

Champions

Singles
- (Serbia) Janko Tipsarević

Doubles
- (France) Jérémy Chardy / (Poland) Łukasz Kubot
- Stuttgart Open

The 2012 MercedesCup was a men's tennis tournament played on outdoor clay courts. It was the 35th edition of the Stuttgart Open, and was part of the ATP World Tour 250 series of the 2012 ATP World Tour. It was held at the Tennis Club Weissenhof in Stuttgart, Germany, from 7 July until 15 July 2012. First-seeded Janko Tipsarević won the singles title.

== Finals ==
=== Singles ===
- (Serbia) Janko Tipsarević defeated (Argentina) Juan Mónaco, 6–4, 5–7, 6–3

=== Doubles ===
- (France) Jérémy Chardy / (Poland) Łukasz Kubot defeated (Slovakia) Michal Mertiňák / (Brazil) André Sá 6–1, 6–3

== Singles main draw entrants ==
=== Seeds ===
Country	Player	Rank^{1}	Seed
SRB	Janko Tipsarević	8	1
ARG	Juan Mónaco	14	2
AUS	Bernard Tomic	28	3
ESP	Pablo Andújar	36	4
NED	Robin Haase	41	5
RUS	Nikolay Davydenko	47	6
POL	Łukasz Kubot	49	7
GER	Tommy Haas	50	8

- ^{1} Seedings are based on the rankings of June 25, 2012

=== Other entrants ===
The following players received wildcards into the singles main draw:

- (Germany) Dustin Brown
- (Germany) Tommy Haas
- (Germany) Robert Kern

The following players received entry from the qualifying draw:

- (Russia) Igor Andreev
- (Slovakia) Pavol Červenák
- (Austria) Martin Fischer
- (Germany) Julian Reister

The following player received entry as a lucky loser:

- (Argentina) Eduardo Schwank

=== Withdrawals ===
- (France) Julien Benneteau → replaced by (Czech Republic) Lukáš Rosol
- (Argentina) Juan Ignacio Chela → replaced by (Germany) Björn Phau
- (Germany) Philipp Petzschner → replaced by (Argentina) Eduardo Schwank
- (Russia) Mikhail Youzhny → replaced by (Ukraine) Sergiy Stakhovsky

== Doubles main draw entrants ==
=== Seeds ===
Country	Player	Country	Player	Rank^{1}	Seed
GER	Dustin Brown	GER	Christopher Kas	73	1
GER	Michael Kohlmann	GER	Philipp Petzschner	87	2
COL	Juan Sebastián Cabal	COL	Robert Farah	94	3
SVK	Michal Mertiňák	BRA	André Sá	124	4

- Rankings are as of June 25, 2012

=== Other entrants ===
The following pairs received wildcards into the doubles main draw:

- (Germany) Martin Emmrich / (Germany) Björn Phau
- (Germany) Robin Kern / (Germany) Jan-Lennard Struff
