= 2013 MercedesCup =

- Date: 6–14 July
- Edition: 36th
- Category: ATP World Tour 250 series
- Draw: 28S / 16D
- Prize money: €410,200
- Surface: Clay / outdoor
- Location: Stuttgart, Germany
- Venue: Tennis Club Weissenhof

Champions

Singles
- (Italy) Fabio Fognini

Doubles
- (Argentina) Facundo Bagnis (Brazil) Thomaz Bellucci
- Stuttgart Open

The 2013 MercedesCup was a men's tennis tournament played on outdoor clay courts. It was the 36th edition of the Stuttgart Open, and was part of the ATP World Tour 250 series of the 2013 ATP World Tour. It was held at the Tennis Club Weissenhof in Stuttgart, Germany, from 6 July until 14 July 2013. Fifth-seeded Fabio Fognini won the singles title.

== Finals ==
=== Singles ===
- (Italy) Fabio Fognini defeated (Germany) Philipp Kohlschreiber, 5–7, 6–4, 6–4

=== Doubles ===
- (Argentina) Facundo Bagnis / (Brazil) Thomaz Bellucci defeated (Poland) Tomasz Bednarek / (Poland) Mateusz Kowalczyk, 2–6, 6–4, [11–9]

== Singles main draw entrants ==
=== Seeds ===
Country	Player	Rank^{1}	Seed
GER	Tommy Haas	13	1
GER	Philipp Kohlschreiber	18	2
FRA	Jérémy Chardy	25	3
FRA	Benoît Paire	27	4
ITA	Fabio Fognini	30	5
GER	Florian Mayer	34	6
CZE	Lukáš Rosol	35	7
SVK	Martin Kližan	36	8

- ^{1} Rankings are as of June 24, 2013

=== Other entrants ===
The following players received wildcards into the singles main draw:

- (Germany) Michael Berrer
- (Germany) Robin Kern
- (Germany) Florian Mayer

The following players received entry from the qualifying draw:

- (Germany) Andreas Beck
- (Germany) Nils Langer
- (Spain) Daniel Muñoz de la Nava
- (United Kingdom) Alexander Ward

=== Withdrawals ===
Before the tournament

- (Uruguay) Pablo Cuevas
- (Slovenia) Grega Žemlja

=== Retirements ===
- (Germany) Michael Berrer (left elbow injury)

== Doubles main draw entrants ==
=== Seeds ===
Country	Player	Country	Player	Rank^{1}	Seed
ESP	Marcel Granollers	ESP	Marc López	7	1
GER	Andre Begemann	GER	Martin Emmrich	87	2
GBR	Jamie Murray	AUS	John Peers	120	3
GER	Dustin Brown	AUS	Paul Hanley	123	4

- Rankings are as of June 24, 2013

=== Other entrants ===
The following pairs received wildcards into the doubles main draw:

- (Germany) Andreas Beck / (Germany) Michael Berrer
- (Germany) Tommy Haas / (Germany) Robin Kern

=== Withdrawals ===
During the tournament

- (Germany) Michael Berrer (left elbow injury)
