= 2023 BOSS Open – Doubles =

Doubles
- 2023 BOSS Open

Final
- Champions: (Croatia) Nikola Mektić (Croatia) Mate Pavić
- Runners-up: (Germany) Kevin Krawietz (Germany) Tim Pütz
- Score: 7–6^{(7–2)}, 6–3

Details
- Draw: 16
- Seeds: 4

Events
Singles	Doubles
← 2022 ·	Stuttgart Open	· 2024 →

Defending champion Mate Pavić and his partner Nikola Mektić defeated Kevin Krawietz and Tim Pütz in the final, 7–6^{(7–2)}, 6–3 to win the doubles tennis title at the 2023 Stuttgart Open.

Hubert Hurkacz and Pavić were the reigning champions, but did not defend their title together. Hurkacz partnered with Marcos Giron, but lost in the first round to Santiago González and Édouard Roger-Vasselin.

== Seeds ==
1. (India) Rohan Bopanna / (Australia) Matthew Ebden (semifinals)
2. (Croatia) Nikola Mektić / (Croatia) Mate Pavić (champions)
3. (Mexico) Santiago González / (France) Édouard Roger-Vasselin (quarterfinals)
4. (Germany) Kevin Krawietz / (Germany) Tim Pütz (final)

== Draw ==
=== Key ===
- Q = Qualifier
- WC = Wild card
- LL = Lucky loser
- Alt = Alternate
- SE = Special exempt
- PR = Protected ranking
- ITF = ITF entry
- JE = Junior exempt
- w/o = Walkover
- r = Retired
- d = Defaulted
- SR = Special ranking

=== Draw ===
First round
1	(India) R Bopanna (Australia) M Ebden	6	6
(Monaco) R Arneodo (France) G Barrère	0	3
(Italy) L Musetti (Italy) L Sonego	7^{11}	6
(United States) W Blumberg (United States) F Tiafoe	6^{9}	4
4	(Germany) K Krawietz (Germany) T Pütz	6	7
(France) S Doumbia (France) F Reboul	4	5
WC	(Germany) D Altmaier (Jamaica) D Brown	6	7^{7}
(Portugal) F Cabral (Brazil) R Matos	2	6^{3}
(Austria) A Erler (Austria) L Miedler	3	7^{7}	[10]
A Karatsev (Czech Republic) J Lehečka	6	6^{3}	[7]
(United States) M Giron (Poland) H Hurkacz	1	5
3	(Mexico) S González (France) É Roger-Vasselin	6	7
(Brazil) M Demoliner (Germany) A Mies	7^{7}	6
(France) A Olivetti (Spain) D Vega Hernández	6^{3}	3
WC	(Germany) O Otte (Germany) J-L Struff	6^{0}	6	[10]
2	(Croatia) N Mektić (Croatia) M Pavić	7^{7}	3	[12]

Quarterfinals
1	(India) R Bopanna (Australia) M Ebden	6	7
(Italy) L Musetti (Italy) L Sonego	1	5
4	(Germany) K Krawietz (Germany) T Pütz	w/o
WC	(Germany) D Altmaier (Jamaica) D Brown
(Austria) A Erler (Austria) L Miedler	7^{7}	6
3	(Mexico) S González (France) É Roger-Vasselin	6^{3}	3
(Brazil) M Demoliner (Germany) A Mies	6	4	[7]
2	(Croatia) N Mektić (Croatia) M Pavić	4	6	[10]

Semifinals
1	(India) R Bopanna (Australia) M Ebden	6^{6}	7^{14}	[4]
4	(Germany) K Krawietz (Germany) T Pütz	7^{8}	6^{12}	[10]
(Austria) A Erler (Austria) L Miedler	3	3
2	(Croatia) N Mektić (Croatia) M Pavić	6	6

Final
4	(Germany) K Krawietz (Germany) T Pütz	6^{2}	3
2	(Croatia) N Mektić (Croatia) M Pavić	7^{7}	6
