= 2006 Mercedes Cup – Doubles =

Doubles
- 2006 Mercedes Cup

Final
- Champions: (Argentina) Gastón Gaudio (Belarus) Max Mirnyi
- Runners-up: (Switzerland) Yves Allegro (Sweden) Robert Lindstedt
- Score: 7–5, 6–7^{(4–7)}, [12–10]

Details
- Draw: 16
- Seeds: 4

Events
Singles	Doubles
← 2005 ·	Stuttgart Open	· 2007 →

José Acasuso and Sebastián Prieto were defending champions, but Acasuso chose not to compete. Prieto teamed up with Martín García and lost in the quarterfinals.

Gastón Gaudio and Max Mirnyi won the title, defeating Yves Allegro and Robert Lindstedt

== Seeds ==
1. (Czech Republic) Lukáš Dlouhý / (Czech Republic) Pavel Vízner (first round)
2. (Austria) Julian Knowle / (Austria) Jürgen Melzer (first round)
3. (Czech Republic) František Čermák / (Czech Republic) Leoš Friedl (first round)
4. (Czech Republic) Martin Damm / (Czech Republic) Petr Pála (quarterfinals)

== Draw ==
=== Key ===
- Q = Qualifier
- WC = Wild card
- LL = Lucky loser
- Alt = Alternate
- SE = Special exempt
- PR = Protected ranking
- ITF = ITF entry
- JE = Junior exempt
- w/o = Walkover
- r = Retired
- d = Defaulted
- SR = Special ranking

=== Draw ===
First round
1	(Czech Republic) L Dlouhý (Czech Republic) P Vízner	5	4
(Belgium) C Rochus (France) G Simon	7	6
(Argentina) JI Chela (Peru) L Horna	6	6
WC	(Germany) R Schüttler (Russia) M Youzhny	3	4
4	(Czech Republic) M Damm (Czech Republic) P Pála	6	1	[10]
(Czech Republic) T Berdych (Czech Republic) J Levinský	4	6	[7]
(Argentina) G Gaudio (Belarus) M Mirnyi	5	7	[10]
(Czech Republic) J Novák (Romania) A Pavel	7	5	[7]
(Argentina) M García (Argentina) S Prieto	6	1	[14]
WC	(Germany) P Petzschner (Germany) B Phau	2	6	[12]
(Germany) M Kohlmann (Germany) A Waske	6	6
3	(Czech Republic) F Čermák (Czech Republic) L Friedl	3	4
(Belgium) K Vliegen (Switzerland) S Wawrinka	3	7	[10]
(Austria) O Marach (Czech Republic) C Suk	6	5	[6]
(Switzerland) Y Allegro (Sweden) R Lindstedt	4	6	[10]
2	(Austria) J Knowle (Austria) J Melzer	6	3	[7]

Quarterfinals
(Belgium) C Rochus (France) G Simon	2	2
(Argentina) JI Chela (Peru) L Horna	6	6
4	(Czech Republic) M Damm (Czech Republic) P Pála	6^{6}	6	[8]
(Argentina) G Gaudio (Belarus) M Mirnyi	7^{8}	3	[10]
(Argentina) M García (Argentina) S Prieto	2	6^{3}
(Germany) M Kohlmann (Germany) A Waske	6	7^{7}
(Belgium) K Vliegen (Switzerland) S Wawrinka	5	1
(Switzerland) Y Allegro (Sweden) R Lindstedt	7	6

Semifinals
(Argentina) JI Chela (Peru) L Horna
(Argentina) G Gaudio (Belarus) M Mirnyi	w/o
(Germany) M Kohlmann (Germany) A Waske	3	1
(Switzerland) Y Allegro (Sweden) R Lindstedt	6	6

Final
(Argentina) G Gaudio (Belarus) M Mirnyi	7	6^{4}	[12]
(Switzerland) Y Allegro (Sweden) R Lindstedt	5	7^{7}	[10]
