= 2011 MercedesCup – Doubles =

Doubles
- 2011 MercedesCup

Final
- Champion: (Austria) Jürgen Melzer (Germany) Philipp Petzschner
- Runner-up: (Spain) Marcel Granollers (Spain) Marc López
- Score: 6–3, 6–4

Details
- Draw: 16
- Seeds: 4

Events
Singles	Doubles
← 2010 ·	Stuttgart Open	· 2012 →

Carlos Berlocq and Eduardo Schwank were the defending champions, but decided not to participate.
Jürgen Melzer and Philipp Petzschner defeated Marcel Granollers and Marc López in the final, 6–3, 6–4.

== Seeds ==
1. (Poland) Łukasz Kubot / (Austria) Oliver Marach (first round)
2. (Austria) Jürgen Melzer / (Germany) Philipp Petzschner (champions)
3. (Spain) Marcel Granollers / (Spain) Marc López (final)
4. (Germany) Christopher Kas / (Austria) Alexander Peya (semifinals)

== Draw ==
=== Key ===
- Q = Qualifier
- WC = Wild card
- LL = Lucky loser
- Alt = Alternate
- SE = Special exempt
- PR = Protected ranking
- ITF = ITF entry
- JE = Junior exempt
- w/o = Walkover
- r = Retired
- d = Defaulted
- SR = Special ranking

=== Draw ===
First round
1	(Poland) Ł Kubot (Austria) O Marach	3	6^{8}
(Italy) D Bracciali (Belgium) D Norman	6	7^{10}
(Spain) P Andújar (Spain) D Gimeno-Traver	4	6	[10]
(France) J Chardy (Czech Republic) L Dlouhý	6	4	[7]
3	(Spain) M Granollers (Spain) M López	6	6
(Ukraine) S Stakhovsky (Czech Republic) R Štěpánek	2	1
(Mexico) S González (Canada) A Shamasdin	5	6	[10]
(France) G Monfils (France) G Simon	7	3	[8]
(United States) J Cerretani (Germany) P Marx	2	4
WC	(Germany) A Waske (Germany) M Zverev	6	6
(Spain) G García-López (Croatia) L Zovko	3	2
4	(Germany) C Kas (Austria) A Peya	6	6
(Italy) A Motti (Italy) A Seppi	3	6	[11]
WC	(Germany) B Knittel (Germany) C-M Stebe	6	3	[13]
(Italy) F Fognini (Italy) P Lorenzi	4	2
2	(Austria) J Melzer (Germany) P Petzschner	6	6

Quarterfinals
(Italy) D Bracciali (Belgium) D Norman	7	5	[8]
(Spain) P Andújar (Spain) D Gimeno-Traver	5	7	[10]
3	(Spain) M Granollers (Spain) M López	6	6
(Mexico) S González (Canada) A Shamasdin	1	3
WC	(Germany) A Waske (Germany) M Zverev	4	0
4	(Germany) C Kas (Austria) A Peya	6	6
WC	(Germany) B Knittel (Germany) C-M Stebe	4	4
2	(Austria) J Melzer (Germany) P Petzschner	6	6

Semifinals
(Spain) P Andújar (Spain) D Gimeno-Traver	4	4
3	(Spain) M Granollers (Spain) M López	6	6
4	(Germany) C Kas (Austria) A Peya	4	1
2	(Austria) J Melzer (Germany) P Petzschner	6	6

Final
3	(Spain) M Granollers (Spain) M López	3	4
2	(Austria) J Melzer (Germany) P Petzschner	6	6
