= 2013 MercedesCup – Singles =

Singles
- 2013 MercedesCup

Final
- Champion: (Italy) Fabio Fognini
- Runner-up: (Germany) Philipp Kohlschreiber
- Score: 5–7, 6–4, 6–4

Details
- Draw: 28
- Seeds: 8

Events
Singles	Doubles
- Stuttgart Open

The 2013 MercedesCup was a men's tennis tournament held at the Tennis Club Weissenhof in Stuttgart, Germany. Janko Tipsarević was the defending champion, but chose not to compete.
Fifth-seeded Fabio Fognini won the title, defeating Philipp Kohlschreiber in the final, 5–7, 6–4, 6–4.

== Seeds ==
The top four seeds receive a bye into the second round.

1. (Germany) Tommy Haas (quarterfinals)
2. (Germany) Philipp Kohlschreiber (final)
3. (France) Jérémy Chardy (second round)
4. (France) Benoît Paire (quarterfinals)
5. (Italy) Fabio Fognini (champion)
6. (Germany) Florian Mayer (second round)
7. (Czech Republic) Lukáš Rosol (first round)
8. (Slovakia) Martin Kližan (second round)

== Draw ==
Key

- Q = Qualifier
- WC = Wild card
- LL = Lucky loser
- Alt = Alternate
- ITF = ITF entry
- PR = Protected ranking
- SR = Special ranking
- SE = Special exempt
- JE = Junior exempt
- JR = Junior Accelerator Programme entrant
- CO = College Accelerator Programme entrant
- NG = Next Gen Accelerator Program entrant
- w/o = Walkover
- r = Retired
- d = Defaulted

=== Finals ===
Semifinals
5	(Italy) Fabio Fognini	6	6
(Spain) Roberto Bautista Agut	1	3
(Romania) Victor Hănescu	3	3
2	(Germany) Philipp Kohlschreiber	6	6

Final
5	(Italy) Fabio Fognini	5	6	6
2	(Germany) Philipp Kohlschreiber	7	4	4

=== Top half ===
First round
(Spain) M Granollers	6	1	1
(Latvia) E Gulbis	4	6	6
(Argentina) L Mayer	3	7^{7}	7^{7}
(Spain) P Andújar	6	6^{5}	6^{5}
Q	(United Kingdom) A Ward	3	6^{5}
5	(Italy) F Fognini	6	7^{7}
WC	(Germany) M Berrer	6	3	6
(Spain) D Gimeno Traver	4	6	1
(Spain) R Bautista Agut	6	7^{7}
(Germany) T Kamke	3	6^{4}
(Spain) A Montañés	2	3
8	(Slovakia) M Kližan	6	6

Second round
1	(Germany) T Haas	6	3	6
(Latvia) E Gulbis	0	6	4
(Argentina) L Mayer	1	3
5	(Italy) F Fognini	6	6
3	(France) J Chardy	2	7^{7}	3
WC	(Germany) M Berrer	6	6^{1}	6
(Spain) R Bautista Agut	6^{3}	6	6
8	(Slovakia) M Kližan	7^{7}	1	4

Quarterfinals
1	(Germany) T Haas	2	4
5	(Italy) F Fognini	6	6
WC	(Germany) M Berrer	2	1^{r}
(Spain) R Bautista Agut	6	0

Semifinals
5	(Italy) F Fognini	6	6
(Spain) R Bautista Agut	1	3

=== Bottom half ===
First round
7	(Czech Republic) L Rosol	4	4
(Brazil) T Bellucci	6	6
(Romania) V Hănescu	3	6	7^{9}
(Russia) D Tursunov	6	3	6^{7}
Q	(Spain) D Muñoz de la Nava	7^{8}	3	4
(Russia) N Davydenko	6^{6}	6	6
6/WC	(Germany) F Mayer	6	3	6
Q	(Germany) A Beck	4	6	1
(France) P-H Mathieu	6^{0}	4
(France) G Monfils	7^{7}	6
Q	(Germany) N Langer	3	6	6
WC	(Germany) R Kern	6	4	3

Second round
(Brazil) T Bellucci	1	4
(Romania) V Hănescu	6	6
(Russia) N Davydenko	3	1
4	(France) B Paire	6	6
6/WC	(Germany) F Mayer	3	0
(France) G Monfils	6	6
Q	(Germany) N Langer	5	2
2	(Germany) P Kohlschreiber	7	6

Quarterfinals
(Romania) V Hănescu	7	6
4	(France) B Paire	5	2
(France) G Monfils	4	4
2	(Germany) P Kohlschreiber	6	6

Semifinals
(Romania) V Hănescu	3	3
2	(Germany) P Kohlschreiber	6	6

== Qualifying ==
=== Seeds ===
The first three seeds received a bye into the second round.

1. (Spain) Daniel Muñoz de la Nava (qualified)
2. (Argentina) Facundo Bagnis (second round)
3. (Germany) Cedrik-Marcel Stebe (second round)
4. (Kazakhstan) Evgeny Korolev (qualifying competition)
5. (Czech Republic) Jan Mertl (second round)
6. (Germany) Dustin Brown (second round)
7. (Slovakia) Pavol Červenák (second round)
8. (Bosnia and Herzegovina) Damir Džumhur (second round)

=== Qualifiers ===
1. (Spain) Daniel Muñoz de la Nava
2. (Germany) Andreas Beck
3. (United Kingdom) Alexander Ward
4. (Germany) Nils Langer

=== Qualifying draw ===
==== First qualifier ====
First round
(Germany) Elmar Ejupovic	4	2
(Poland) Andriej Kapaś	6	6
(Poland) Grzegorz Panfil	6	6
WC	(Germany) Lukas Winkelmann	4	2
(Germany) Alexander Mannapov	0	1
7	(Slovakia) Pavol Červenák	6	6

Second round
1	(Spain) Daniel Muñoz de la Nava	7^{7}	6
(Poland) Andriej Kapaś	6^{5}	1
(Poland) Grzegorz Panfil	6^{5}	6	6
7	(Slovakia) Pavol Červenák	7^{7}	2	4

Qualifying competition
1	(Spain) Daniel Muñoz de la Nava	7^{7}	6
(Poland) Grzegorz Panfil	6^{2}	1

==== Second qualifier ====
First round
(Germany) Dennis Blömke	6	6
(Russia) Evgeny Karlovskiy	1	1
(Republic of Ireland) Louk Sorensen	6	6^{2}	2
(Germany) Andreas Beck	2	7^{7}	6
(United Kingdom) Daniel Smethurst	2	2
8	(Bosnia and Herzegovina) Damir Džumhur	6	6

Second round
2	(Argentina) Facundo Bagnis	6^{7}	1
(Germany) Dennis Blömke	7^{9}	6
(Germany) Andreas Beck	4	6	6
8	(Bosnia and Herzegovina) Damir Džumhur	6	4	3

Qualifying competition
(Germany) Dennis Blömke	3	1
(Germany) Andreas Beck	6	6

==== Third qualifier ====
First round
(Czech Republic) Ivo Minář	6	6
(Germany) Adriano Quinti	3	0
(United Kingdom) Alexander Ward	6	6
(Switzerland) Sandro Ehrat	0	4
WC	(Germany) Victor Schmid	1	3
6	(Germany) Dustin Brown	6	6

Second round
3	(Germany) Cedrik-Marcel Stebe	4	6	3
(Czech Republic) Ivo Minář	6	1	6
(United Kingdom) Alexander Ward	6	6
6	(Germany) Dustin Brown	1	2

Qualifying competition
(Czech Republic) Ivo Minář	4	5
(United Kingdom) Alexander Ward	6	7

==== Fourth qualifier ====
First round
4	(Kazakhstan) Evgeny Korolev	6	6
(Germany) Pascal Meis	3	1
WC	(Croatia) Blaž Serić	6	6
(Germany) Nicolas Ernst	4	2
(Germany) Nils Langer	6	2	7^{7}
(Slovakia) Ivo Klec	4	6	6^{2}
(Germany) Maximilian Abel	2	6	1
5/WC	(Czech Republic) Jan Mertl	6	4	6

Second round
4	(Kazakhstan) Evgeny Korolev	6	6
WC	(Croatia) Blaž Serić	4	3
(Germany) Nils Langer	7^{7}	6
5/WC	(Czech Republic) Jan Mertl	6^{4}	4

Qualifying competition
4	(Kazakhstan) Evgeny Korolev	4	3
(Germany) Nils Langer	6	6
