= 2006 Mercedes Cup – Singles =

Singles
- 2006 Mercedes Cup

Final
- Champion: (Spain) David Ferrer
- Runner-up: (Argentina) José Acasuso
- Score: 6–4, 3–6, 6–7^{(3–7)}, 7–5, 6–4

Details
- Draw: 48
- Seeds: 16

Events
Singles	Doubles
- Stuttgart Open

Third-seeded David Ferrer defeated José Acasuso 6–4, 3–6, 6–7^{(3–7)}, 7–5, 6–4 to win the 2006 Mercedes Cup singles event.

== Seeds ==
1. (Argentina) Gastón Gaudio (second round)
2. (Czech Republic) Tomáš Berdych (semifinals)
3. (Spain) David Ferrer (champion)
4. (Belgium) Olivier Rochus (withdrew)
5. (Argentina) José Acasuso (final)
6. (Belgium) Kristof Vliegen (second round)
7. (France) Florent Serra (second round)
8. (Argentina) Juan Ignacio Chela (second round)
9. (France) Gilles Simon (second round)
10. (Spain) Nicolás Almagro (second round)
11. (Russia) Mikhail Youzhny (second round)
12. (Belarus) Max Mirnyi (second round)
13. (Peru) Luis Horna (quarterfinals)
14. (Italy) Filippo Volandri (second round)
15. (Germany) Björn Phau (second round)
16. (France) Richard Gasquet (second round)

== Draws ==
=== Key ===
- Q - Qualifier
- WC - Wild Card
- r - Retired
- LL - Lucky loser
- w/o - Walkover

=== Finals ===
Quarterfinals
13	(Peru) Luis Horna	2^{r}
(Argentina) Juan Mónaco	5
(Austria) Oliver Marach	2	3
5	(Argentina) José Acasuso	6	6
(Germany) Florian Mayer	4	3
3	(Spain) David Ferrer	6	6
Q	(Ecuador) Nicolás Lapentti	1	2
2	(Czech Republic) Tomáš Berdych	6	6

Semifinals
(Argentina) Juan Mónaco	6	2	2
5	(Argentina) José Acasuso	4	6	6
3	(Spain) David Ferrer	6	7
2	(Czech Republic) Tomáš Berdych	3	5

Final
5	(Argentina) José Acasuso	4	6	7	5	4
3	(Spain) David Ferrer	6	3	6^{3}	7	6

=== Section 1 ===
First round
(Argentina) M Zabaleta	6	3	6
(Germany) A Waske	3	6	3
(Brazil) F Saretta	7	3	3
(Spain) A Portas	5	6	6
(Austria) J Melzer	w/o
(Germany) P Kohlschreiber
(Argentina) J Mónaco	4	7	6
(Germany) M Berrer	6	6^{6}	4

Second round
1	(Argentina) G Gaudio	4	0
(Argentina) M Zabaleta	6	6
(Spain) A Portas	6	2^{4}
13	(Peru) L Horna	7	6
12	(Belarus) M Mirnyi	3	1
(Austria) J Melzer	6	6
(Argentina) J Mónaco	6	1
6	(Belgium) K Vliegen	3	0	f

Third round
(Argentina) M Zabaleta	3	7	4
13	(Peru) L Horna	6	6^{6}	6
(Austria) J Melzer	4	7	4
(Argentina) J Mónaco	6	6^{3}	6

Quarterfinals
13	(Peru) L Horna	2^{r}
(Argentina) J Mónaco	5

=== Section 2 ===
First round
(Czech Republic) J Vaněk	3	6	3
(Russia) T Gabashvili	6	4	6
WC	(Germany) T Popp	1	2
(Austria) O Marach	6	6
(Germany) R Schüttler	5	5
(Germany) S Greul	7	7
(Italy) A Seppi	7	6
(Belgium) D Norman	6^{8}	4

Second round
LL	(Austria) S Koubek	7	6
(Russia) T Gabashvili	6^{6}	2
(Austria) O Marach	6	6
16	(France) R Gasquet	4	2
11	(Russia) M Youzhny	7	5	4
(Germany) S Greul	6^{5}	7	6
(Italy) A Seppi	4	6^{2}
5	(Argentina) J Acasuso	6	7

Third round
LL	(Austria) S Koubek	4	4
(Austria) O Marach	6	6
(Germany) S Greul	6^{4}	6	4
5	(Argentina) J Acasuso	7	2	6

Quarterfinals
(Austria) O Marach	2	3
5	(Argentina) J Acasuso	6	6

=== Section 3 ===
First round
(Romania) A Pavel	6	3	2
Q	(Argentina) JM del Potro	3	6	6
WC	(Germany) A Beck	4	6	3
(Germany) F Mayer	6	3	6
(Czech Republic) L Dlouhý	7	3	4
(Switzerland) S Wawrinka	6^{1}	6	6
Q	(Italy) S Bolelli	6^{4}	1
(Czech Republic) J Novák	7	6

Second round
8	(Argentina) JI Chela	2	6	1
Q	(Argentina) JM del Potro	6	4	6
(Germany) F Mayer	7	6
9	(France) G Simon	6^{3}	2
15	(Germany) B Phau	7	2	3
(Switzerland) S Wawrinka	6^{3}	6	6
(Czech Republic) J Novák	3	1
3	(Spain) D Ferrer	6	6

Third round
Q	(Argentina) JM del Potro	1	0
(Germany) F Mayer	6	6
(Switzerland) S Wawrinka	3	4
3	(Spain) D Ferrer	6	6

Quarterfinals
(Germany) F Mayer	4	3
3	(Spain) D Ferrer	6	6

=== Section 4 ===
First round
Q	(Ecuador) N Lapentti	4	6	6
WC	(Germany) S Rieschick	6	3	1
Q	(Argentina) D Hartfield	3	7	6
(Czech Republic) R Vik	6	6^{7}	4
(Belgium) C Rochus	3	6	6^{5}
Q	(Argentina) D Junqueira	6	2	7
WC	(Germany) D Kindlmann	4	3
Q	(United States) H Armando	6	6

Second round
7	(France) F Serra	7	6^{3}	2
Q	(Ecuador) N Lapentti	5	7	6
Q	(Argentina) D Hartfield	6^{2}	7	7
10	(Spain) N Almagro	7	6^{1}	5
14	(Italy) F Volandri	3	4
Q	(Argentina) D Junqueira	6	6
Q	(United States) H Armando	5	3
2	(Czech Republic) T Berdych	7	6

Third round
Q	(Ecuador) N Lapentti	7	6
Q	(Argentina) D Hartfield	6^{5}	2
Q	(Argentina) D Junqueira	1	4
2	(Czech Republic) T Berdych	6	6

Quarterfinals
Q	(Ecuador) N Lapentti	1	2
2	(Czech Republic) T Berdych	6	6
