= 2012 MercedesCup – Doubles =

Doubles
- 2012 MercedesCup

Final
- Champion: (France) Jérémy Chardy (Poland) Łukasz Kubot
- Runner-up: (Slovakia) Michal Mertiňák (Brazil) André Sá
- Score: 6–1, 6–3

Details
- Draw: 16
- Seeds: 4

Events
Singles	Doubles
← 2011 ·	Stuttgart Open	· 2013 →

Jürgen Melzer and Philipp Petzschner were the defending champions but Melzer decided not to participate. Petzschner plays alongside Michael Kohlmann.
Jérémy Chardy and Łukasz Kubot won the title by beating Michal Mertiňák and André Sá 6–1, 6–3 in the final.

== Seeds ==
1. (Germany) Dustin Brown / (Germany) Christopher Kas (quarterfinals)
2. (Germany) Michael Kohlmann / (Germany) Philipp Petzschner (first round)
3. (Colombia) Juan Sebastián Cabal / (Colombia) Robert Farah (semifinals)
4. (Slovakia) Michal Mertiňák / (Brazil) André Sá (final)

== Draw ==
=== Key ===
- Q = Qualifier
- WC = Wild card
- LL = Lucky loser
- Alt = Alternate
- SE = Special exempt
- PR = Protected ranking
- ITF = ITF entry
- JE = Junior exempt
- w/o = Walkover
- r = Retired
- d = Defaulted
- SR = Special ranking

=== Draw ===
First round
1	(Germany) D Brown (Germany) C Kas	6	6
WC	(Germany) R Kern (Germany) J-L Struff	4	3
(Brazil) T Bellucci (Argentina) E Schwank	5	6	[6]
WC	(Germany) M Emmrich (Germany) B Phau	7	4	[10]
4	(Slovakia) M Mertiňák (Brazil) A Sá	4	6	[10]
(Czech Republic) F Čermák (Czech Republic) L Rosol	6	2	[6]
(Italy) F Cipolla (Spain) R Ramírez Hidalgo	6	2	[10]
(Germany) T Kamke (Germany) P Marx	3	6	[12]
(Spain) P Andújar (Spain) G García-López	6	1	[11]
(Russia) I Andreev (Russia) N Davydenko	2	6	[9]
(Germany) C-M Stebe (Australia) B Tomic	2	3
3	(Colombia) JS Cabal (Colombia) R Farah	6	6
(Netherlands) R Haase (Germany) A Waske	6	3	[7]
(France) J Chardy (Poland) Ł Kubot	1	6	[10]
(Italy) A Motti (France) B Paire	7^{7}	6
2	(Germany) M Kohlmann (Germany) P Petzschner	6^{5}	1

Quarterfinals
1	(Germany) D Brown (Germany) C Kas	7^{7}	2	[3]
WC	(Germany) M Emmrich (Germany) B Phau	6^{3}	6	[10]
4	(Slovakia) M Mertiňák (Brazil) A Sá	6	6
(Germany) T Kamke (Germany) P Marx	3	4
(Spain) P Andújar (Spain) G García-López	6	6^{5}	[4]
3	(Colombia) JS Cabal (Colombia) R Farah	4	7^{7}	[10]
(France) J Chardy (Poland) Ł Kubot	6	6
(Italy) A Motti (France) B Paire	3	3

Semifinals
WC	(Germany) M Emmrich (Germany) B Phau	3	4
4	(Slovakia) M Mertiňák (Brazil) A Sá	6	6
3	(Colombia) JS Cabal (Colombia) R Farah	4	4
(France) J Chardy (Poland) Ł Kubot	6	6

Final
4	(Slovakia) M Mertiňák (Brazil) A Sá	1	3
(France) J Chardy (Poland) Ł Kubot	6	6
