= 2011 MercedesCup – Singles =

Singles
- 2011 MercedesCup

Final
- Champion: (Spain) Juan Carlos Ferrero
- Runner-up: (Spain) Pablo Andújar
- Score: 6–4, 6–0

Details
- Draw: 28
- Seeds: 8

Events
Singles	Doubles
- Stuttgart Open

Albert Montañés was the defending champion, but lost to compatriot Pablo Andújar in the second round.

Unseeded Juan Carlos Ferrero won the title, after defeating Andújar 6–4, 6–0 in the final.

== Seeds ==
1. (France) Gaël Monfils (first round)
2. (Austria) Jürgen Melzer (first round)
3. (Russia) Mikhail Youzhny (second round)
4. (France) Gilles Simon (first round)
5. (Germany) Florian Mayer (first round)
6. (Russia) Nikolay Davydenko (first round)
7. (Italy) Andreas Seppi (first round)
8. (Spain) Guillermo García-López (second round)

== Main draw ==
Key

- Q = Qualifier
- WC = Wild card
- LL = Lucky loser
- Alt = Alternate
- ITF = ITF entry
- PR = Protected ranking
- SR = Special ranking
- SE = Special exempt
- JE = Junior exempt
- JR = Junior Accelerator Programme entrant
- CO = College Accelerator Programme entrant
- NG = Next Gen Accelerator Program entrant
- w/o = Walkover
- r = Retired
- d = Defaulted

=== Finals ===
Semifinals
Q	(Argentina) Federico Delbonis	6	4	4
(Spain) Juan Carlos Ferrero	3	6	6
(Spain) Pablo Andújar	6	3	6
WC	(Poland) Łukasz Kubot	4	6	4

Final
(Spain) Juan Carlos Ferrero	6	6
(Spain) Pablo Andújar	4	0

=== Top half ===
First round
1	(France) G Monfils	6	6^{7}	4
(Romania) V Hănescu	2	7^{9}	6
(Germany) M Zverev	4	6	2
Q	(Slovakia) P Červenák	6	4	6
(Ukraine) S Stakhovsky	4	6	7^{7}
(Czech Republic) J Pospíšil	6	2	6^{5}
Q	(Argentina) F del Bonis	6	6
5	(Germany) F Mayer	2	3
3	(Russia) M Youzhny	6	6
(Germany) P Petzschner	3	3
LL	(Germany) B Knittel	2	4
(Spain) JC Ferrero	6	6
(France) B Paire	6^{3}	6	6
Q	(Russia) E Donskoy	7^{7}	4	2
(Spain) M Granollers	6	3	6
7	(Italy) A Seppi	3	6	1

Second round
(Romania) V Hănescu	3	6^{6}
Q	(Slovakia) P Červenák	6	7^{8}
(Ukraine) S Stakhovsky	4	3
Q	(Argentina) F del Bonis	6	6
3	(Russia) M Youzhny	7^{8}	2	2
(Spain) JC Ferrero	6^{6}	6	6
(France) B Paire	4	5
(Spain) M Granollers	6	7

Quarterfinals
Q	(Slovakia) P Červenák	1	2
Q	(Argentina) F del Bonis	6	6
(Spain) JC Ferrero	6	6
(Spain) M Granollers	4	3

Semifinals
Q	(Argentina) F del Bonis	6	4	4
(Spain) JC Ferrero	3	6	6

=== Bottom half ===
First round
6	(Russia) N Davydenko	6	1	4
WC	(Germany) C-M Stebe	3	6	6
WC	(Germany) R Kern	4	1
(Italy) F Fognini	6	6
Q	(Romania) V Crivoi	2	1
(Spain) P Andújar	6	6
(Spain) A Montañés	4	7^{7}	6
4	(France) G Simon	6	6^{5}	2
8	(Spain) G García-López	6	6
(Czech Republic) R Štěpánek	1	3
WC	(Poland) Ł Kubot	7^{7}	3	6
(Spain) D Gimeno-Traver	6^{2}	6	2
(Germany) T Kamke	6^{1}	1
(France) J Chardy	7^{7}	6
(Colombia) S Giraldo	6	7
2	(Austria) J Melzer	4	5

Second round
WC	(Germany) C-M Stebe	7^{7}	6
(Italy) F Fognini	6^{5}	4
(Spain) P Andújar	2	6	6
(Spain) A Montañés	6	4	3
8	(Spain) G García-López	6	4	3
WC	(Poland) Ł Kubot	4	6	6
(France) J Chardy	6	5	4
(Colombia) S Giraldo	1	7	6

Quarterfinals
WC	(Germany) C-M Stebe	2	1
(Spain) P Andújar	6	6
WC	(Poland) Ł Kubot	7	5	6
(Colombia) S Giraldo	5	7	3

Semifinals
(Spain) P Andújar	6	3	6
WC	(Poland) Ł Kubot	4	6	4

== Qualifying draw ==
=== Seeds ===
1. (Germany) Simon Greul (second round)
2. (Russia) Evgeny Donskoy (qualified)
3. (Germany) Bastian Knittel (qualifying competition, lucky loser)
4. (Romania) Victor Crivoi (qualified)
5. (Argentina) Leonardo Mayer (qualifying competition)
6. (Czech Republic) Jan Hernych (second round)
7. (Argentina) Pablo Galdón (first round)
8. (Argentina) Federico Delbonis (qualified)

=== Qualifiers ===
1. (Slovakia) Pavol Červenák
2. (Russia) Evgeny Donskoy
3. (Argentina) Federico del Bonis
4. (Romania) Victor Crivoi

=== Lucky losers ===
1. (Germany) Bastian Knittel

=== First qualifier ===
First round
1	(Germany) Simon Greul	7	6
(Croatia) Joško Topić	5	4
(New Zealand) Matthew Simpson	2	4
(Slovakia) Pavol Červenák	6	6
(Italy) Andrea Arnaboldi	6^{4}	6	6^{5}
(France) Romain Jouan	7^{7}	3	7^{7}
(Croatia) Borut Puc	7^{7}	5	6
7	(Argentina) Pablo Galdón	6^{4}	7	3

Second round
1	(Germany) Simon Greul	1	5
(Slovakia) Pavol Červenák	6	7
(France) Romain Jouan	5	6	6^{6}
(Croatia) Borut Puc	7	2	7^{8}

Qualifying competition
(Slovakia) Pavol Červenák	7	6
(Croatia) Borut Puc	5	4

=== Second qualifier ===
First round
2	(Russia) Evgeny Donskoy	7	4	6
(Argentina) Marco Trungelliti	5	6	0
(Germany) Sebastian Sachs	6	6
(Germany) Nils Langer	2	4
(Germany) Maximilian Marterer	2	2
(Republic of Ireland) Louk Sorensen	6	6
WC	(Germany) Jochen Nufer	0	1
6	(Czech Republic) Jan Hernych	6	6

Second round
2	(Russia) Evgeny Donskoy	6	6
(Germany) Sebastian Sachs	2	4
(Republic of Ireland) Louk Sorensen	6	6
6	(Czech Republic) Jan Hernych	2	2

Qualifying competition
2	(Russia) Evgeny Donskoy	7^{8}	6
(Republic of Ireland) Louk Sorensen	6^{6}	4

=== Third qualifier ===
First round
3	(Germany) Bastian Knittel	6	6
(Croatia) Neven Krivokuća	1	2
(Switzerland) George Bastl	4	4
(Germany) Jaan-Frederik Brunken	6	6
WC	(Bosnia and Herzegovina) Elmar Ejupovic	6	7
(Czech Republic) Jan Blecha	4	5
(Germany) David Thurner	0	3
8	(Argentina) Federico Delbonis	6	6

Second round
3	(Germany) Bastian Knittel	7	6
(Germany) Jaan-Frederik Brunken	5	4
WC	(Bosnia and Herzegovina) Elmar Ejupovic	3	4
8	(Argentina) Federico Delbonis	6	6

Qualifying competition
3	(Germany) Bastian Knittel	2	0
8	(Argentina) Federico Delbonis	6	6

=== Fourth qualifier ===
First round
4	(Romania) Victor Crivoi	3	6	6
(Germany) Marcel Zimmermann	6	4	4
(Netherlands) Remko de Rijke	3	4
WC	(Germany) Florian Fallert	6	6
WC	(Germany) Fabian Schmid	2	1
(Czech Republic) Lukáš Dlouhý	6	6
(Argentina) Renzo Olivo	1	6^{5}
5	(Argentina) Leonardo Mayer	6	7^{7}

Second round
4	(Romania) Victor Crivoi	7	6
WC	(Germany) Florian Fallert	5	3
(Czech Republic) Lukáš Dlouhý	4	6	4
5	(Argentina) Leonardo Mayer	6	4	6

Qualifying competition
4	(Romania) Victor Crivoi	2	6	7
5	(Argentina) Leonardo Mayer	6	1	5
