= 2024 BOSS Open – Doubles =

Doubles
- 2024 BOSS Open

Final
- Champions: (Brazil) Rafael Matos (Brazil) Marcelo Melo
- Runners-up: (United Kingdom) Julian Cash (United States) Robert Galloway
- Score: 3–6, 6–3, [10–8]

Details
- Draw: 16
- Seeds: 4

Events
| Singles | Doubles |
| ← 2023 · | Stuttgart Open | · 2025 → |

Rafael Matos and Marcelo Melo defeated Julian Cash and Robert Galloway in the final, 3–6, 6–3, [10–8] to win the doubles tennis title at the 2024 Stuttgart Open.

Nikola Mektić and Mate Pavić were the reigning champions, but Mektić chose to compete in s'Hertogenbosch instead and Pavić withdrew before the tournament began.

== Seeds ==
1. (Germany) Kevin Krawietz / (Germany) Tim Pütz (first round)
2. (United Kingdom) Neal Skupski / (New Zealand) Michael Venus (first round)
3. (United Kingdom) Lloyd Glasspool / (Netherlands) Jean-Julien Rojer (first round)
4. (Uruguay) Ariel Behar / (Czech Republic) Adam Pavlásek (first round)

== Draw ==
=== Key ===
- Q = Qualifier
- WC = Wild card
- LL = Lucky loser
- Alt = Alternate
- ITF = ITF entry
- PR = Protected ranking
- SR = Special ranking
- SE = Special exempt
- JE = Junior exempt
- JR = Junior Accelerator Programme entrant
- CO = College Accelerator Programme entrant
- NG = Next Gen Accelerator Program entrant
- w/o = Walkover
- r = Retired
- d = Defaulted

=== Draw ===
First round
1 | (Germany) K Krawietz (Germany) T Pütz | 6 | 6^{5} | [8]
(Germany) C Frantzen (Germany) H Jebens | 2 | 7^{7} | [10]
(Romania) VV Cornea (China) Z Zhang | 6 | 6
WC | (Jamaica) D Brown (Austria) S Ofner | 1 | 3
3 | (United Kingdom) L Glasspool (Netherlands) J-J Rojer | 6^{5} | 6 | [3]
(Germany) Y Hanfmann (Germany) D Koepfer | 7^{7} | 2 | [10]
(United States) C Eubanks; R Safiullin | 6 | 1 | [10]
(Brazil) R Matos (Brazil) M Melo | 3 | 6 | [12]
(Austria) A Erler (Austria) L Miedler | 6 | 5 | [7]
WC | (Germany) B Hassan (Germany) D Masur | 4 | 7 | [10]
(United Kingdom) J Cash (United States) R Galloway | 7^{7} | 7
4 | (Uruguay) A Behar (Czech Republic) A Pavlásek | 6^{3} | 5
(France) T Arribagé (France) S Doumbia | 7 | 7^{7}
PR | (New Zealand) M Daniell (United States) M Giron | 5 | 6^{5}
(India) Y Bhambri (France) A Olivetti | 6 | 6
2 | (United Kingdom) N Skupski (New Zealand) M Venus | 4 | 2

Quarterfinals
(Germany) C Frantzen (Germany) H Jebens | 7^{7} | 4 | [10]
(Romania) VV Cornea (China) Z Zhang | 6^{4} | 6 | [2]
(Germany) Y Hanfmann (Germany) D Koepfer | 4 | 2
(Brazil) R Matos (Brazil) M Melo | 6 | 6
WC | (Germany) B Hassan (Germany) D Masur | 2 | 3
(United Kingdom) J Cash (United States) R Galloway | 6 | 6
(France) T Arribagé (France) S Doumbia | 3 | 2
(India) Y Bhambri (France) A Olivetti | 6 | 6

Semifinals
(Germany) C Frantzen (Germany) H Jebens | 6^{5} | 7^{7} | [11]
(Brazil) R Matos (Brazil) M Melo | 7^{7} | 6^{3} | [13]
(United Kingdom) J Cash (United States) R Galloway | 7 | 6
(India) Y Bhambri (France) A Olivetti | 5 | 4

Final
(Brazil) R Matos (Brazil) M Melo | 3 | 6 | [10]
(United Kingdom) J Cash (United States) R Galloway | 6 | 3 | [8]
