= 2024 BOSS Open – Singles =

Singles
- 2024 BOSS Open

Final
- Champion: (United Kingdom) Jack Draper
- Runner-up: (Italy) Matteo Berrettini
- Score: 3–6, 7–6^{(7–5)}, 6–4

Details
- Draw: 28 (4 Q / 3 WC )
- Seeds: 8

Events
Singles	Doubles
← 2023 ·	Stuttgart Open	· 2025 →

Jack Draper defeated Matteo Berrettini in the final, 3–6, 7–6^{(7–5)}, 6–4 to win the singles tennis title at the 2024 Stuttgart Open. It was his first career ATP Tour title and Draper became the first British player to win the title since the tournament's establishment in 1949.

Frances Tiafoe was the defending champion, but lost in the quarterfinals to Draper.

== Seeds ==
The top four seeds received a bye into the second round.

1. (Germany) Alexander Zverev (withdrew)
2. (United States) Ben Shelton (second round)
3. (Kazakhstan) Alexander Bublik (quarterfinals, retired)
4. (United States) Frances Tiafoe (quarterfinals)
5. (Italy) Lorenzo Musetti (semifinals)
6. (United Kingdom) Jack Draper (champion)
7. (Germany) Jan-Lennard Struff (quarterfinals, withdrew)
8. Roman Safiullin (first round)

== Draw ==
=== Key ===
- Q = Qualifier
- WC = Wild card
- LL = Lucky loser
- Alt = Alternate
- ITF = ITF entry
- PR = Protected ranking
- SR = Special ranking
- SE = Special exempt
- JE = Junior exempt
- JR = Junior Accelerator Programme entrant
- CO = College Accelerator Programme entrant
- NG = Next Gen Accelerator Program entrant
- w/o = Walkover
- r = Retired
- d = Defaulted

=== Finals ===
Semifinals
(United States) Brandon Nakashima	3	3
6	(United Kingdom) Jack Draper	6	6
5	(Italy) Lorenzo Musetti	4	0
PR	(Italy) Matteo Berrettini	6	6

Final
6	(United Kingdom) Jack Draper	3	7^{7}	6
PR	(Italy) Matteo Berrettini	6	6^{5}	4

=== Top half ===
First round
(United States) C Eubanks	6^{4}	4
(United States) B Nakashima	7^{7}	6
(France) A Rinderknech	6	7
(United States) A Michelsen	4	5
(Italy) F Cobolli	6^{7}	3
7	(Germany) J-L Struff	7^{9}	6
WC	(Germany) H Squire	3	3
(Germany) Y Hanfmann	6	6
(United States) M Giron	6	6
(United Kingdom) A Murray	3	4
(Austria) S Ofner	6^{4}	6^{5}
6	(United Kingdom) J Draper	7^{7}	7^{7}

Second round
LL	(France) R Gasquet	3	4
(United States) B Nakashima	6	6
(France) A Rinderknech	4	6^{0}
7	(Germany) J-L Struff	6	7^{7}
4	(United States) F Tiafoe	7	7^{7}
(Germany) Y Hanfmann	5	6^{5}
(United States) M Giron	4	6	3
6	(United Kingdom) J Draper	6	3	6

Quarterfinals
(United States) B Nakashima	w/o
7	(Germany) J-L Struff
4	(United States) F Tiafoe	7	4	6^{1}
6	(United Kingdom) J Draper	5	6	7^{7}

Semifinals
(United States) B Nakashima	3	3
6	(United Kingdom) J Draper	6	6

=== Bottom half ===
First round
5	(Italy) L Musetti	7^{11}	7^{11}
Q	(France) G Mpetshi Perricard	6^{9}	6^{9}
(Germany) D Koepfer	4	7^{7}	7^{8}
(China) Z Zhang	6	6^{5}	6^{6}
WC	(Serbia) H Medjedovic	6^{3}	6	6
(Hungary) F Marozsán	7^{7}	1	4
8	R Safiullin	6^{8}	7	5
PR	(Italy) M Berrettini	7^{10}	5	7
Q	(France) M Martineau	6^{5}	5
WC	(Canada) D Shapovalov	7^{7}	7
Q	(Australia) J Duckworth	6	7^{7}
Q	(France) P-H Herbert	4	6^{2}

Second round
5	(Italy) L Musetti	6^{9}	7^{7}	6
(Germany) D Koepfer	7^{11}	6^{5}	3
WC	(Serbia) H Medjedovic	1	6^{4}
3	(Kazakhstan) A Bublik	6	7^{7}
PR	(Italy) M Berrettini	6	6
WC	(Canada) D Shapovalov	4	4
Q	(Australia) J Duckworth	7^{7}	4	6
2	(United States) B Shelton	6^{5}	6	3

Quarterfinals
5	(Italy) L Musetti	4	6	1
3	(Kazakhstan) A Bublik	6	1	0^{r}
PR	(Italy) M Berrettini	6	7
Q	(Australia) J Duckworth	4	5

Semifinals
5	(Italy) L Musetti	4	0
PR	(Italy) M Berrettini	6	6

== Qualifying ==
=== Seeds ===
1. (France) Giovanni Mpetshi Perricard (qualified)
2. (Germany) Maximilian Marterer (first round)
3. (Australia) James Duckworth (qualified)
4. (France) Richard Gasquet (qualifying competition, lucky loser)
5. (Serbia) Hamad Medjedovic (received wildcard to main draw)
6. (France) Pierre-Hugues Herbert (qualified)
7. (Germany) Benjamin Hassan (qualifying competition)
8. (Germany) Rudolf Molleker (qualifying competition)

=== Qualifiers ===
1. (France) Giovanni Mpetshi Perricard
2. (France) Matteo Martineau
3. (Australia) James Duckworth
4. (France) Pierre-Hugues Herbert

=== Lucky loser ===
1. (France) Richard Gasquet

=== Qualifying draw ===
==== First qualifier ====
First round
1	(France) Giovanni Mpetshi Perricard	6	6
Alt	(Ukraine) Vadym Ursu	3	4
WC	(Germany) Max Hans Rehberg	3	6^{1}
7	(Germany) Benjamin Hassan	6	7^{7}

Qualifying competition
1	(France) Giovanni Mpetshi Perricard	7^{7}	6^{7}	7^{7}
7	(Germany) Benjamin Hassan	6^{5}	7^{9}	6^{5}

==== Second qualifier ====
First round
2	(Germany) Maximilian Marterer	4	6^{7}
(France) Matteo Martineau	6	7^{9}
(United States) Maxime Cressy	6	6
Alt	(Germany) Liam Gavrielides	3	2

Qualifying competition
(France) Matteo Martineau	6	6^{2}	7^{7}
(United States) Maxime Cressy	4	7^{7}	6^{5}

==== Third qualifier ====
First round
3	(Australia) James Duckworth	7^{7}	7^{7}
(Uzbekistan) Khumoyun Sultanov	6^{5}	6^{4}
WC	(Spain) Joan Nadal	2	2
8	(Germany) Rudolf Molleker	6	6

Qualifying competition
3	(Australia) James Duckworth	6	3	6
8	(Germany) Rudolf Molleker	3	6	3

==== Fourth qualifier ====
First round
4	(France) Richard Gasquet	6	6
(France) Benjamin Bonzi	4	4
(Germany) Daniel Masur	6	6^{7}	6^{6}
6	(France) Pierre-Hugues Herbert	1	7^{9}	7^{8}

Qualifying competition
4	(France) Richard Gasquet	3	7^{7}	6^{5}
6	(France) Pierre-Hugues Herbert	6	6^{2}	7^{7}
