= 2022 BOSS Open – Singles =

Singles
- 2022 BOSS Open

Final
- Champion: (Italy) Matteo Berrettini
- Runner-up: (United Kingdom) Andy Murray
- Score: 6–4, 5–7, 6–3

Details
- Draw: 28 (4 Q / 3 WC )
- Seeds: 8

Events
Singles	Doubles
← 2021 ·	Stuttgart Open	· 2023 →

Matteo Berrettini defeated Andy Murray in the final, 6–4, 5–7, 6–3 to win the singles tennis title at the 2022 Stuttgart Open.

Marin Čilić was the defending champion, but chose not to participate.

== Seeds ==
The top four seeds receive a bye into the second round.

1. (Greece) Stefanos Tsitsipas (quarterfinals)
2. (Italy) Matteo Berrettini (champion)
3. (Poland) Hubert Hurkacz (second round)
4. (Canada) Denis Shapovalov (second round)
5. (Georgia (country)) Nikoloz Basilashvili (second round)
6. (Italy) Lorenzo Sonego (quarterfinals)
7. (Kazakhstan) Alexander Bublik (second round)
8. (France) Ugo Humbert (first round)

== Draw ==
=== Key ===
- Q = Qualifier
- WC = Wild card
- LL = Lucky loser
- Alt = Alternate
- SE = Special exempt
- PR = Protected ranking
- ITF = ITF entry
- JE = Junior exempt
- w/o = Walkover
- r = Retired
- d = Defaulted
- SR = Special ranking

=== Finals ===
Semifinals
(United Kingdom) Andy Murray	7^{7}	6
(Australia) Nick Kyrgios	6^{5}	2
(Germany) Oscar Otte	6^{7}	6^{5}
2	(Italy) Matteo Berrettini	7^{9}	7^{7}

Final
(United Kingdom) Andy Murray	4	7	3
2	(Italy) Matteo Berrettini	6	5	6

=== Top half ===
First round
(United States) M Cressy	7^{7}	6^{5}	6^{2}
Q	(Switzerland) D Stricker	6^{2}	7^{7}	7^{7}
(United Kingdom) A Murray	6	6
Q	(Australia) C O'Connell	4	3
(United States) D Kudla	6^{3}	5
7	(Kazakhstan) A Bublik	7^{7}	7
(Hungary) M Fucsovics	6^{5}	6	6
Q	(Austria) J Rodionov	7^{7}	3	4
(Czech Republic) J Lehečka	6^{3}	3
(Australia) N Kyrgios	7^{7}	6
(Italy) L Musetti	5	3
5	(Georgia (country)) N Basilashvili	7	6

Second round
1/WC	(Greece) S Tsitsipas	6	6
Q	(Switzerland) D Stricker	3	4
(United Kingdom) A Murray	6	7^{7}
7	(Kazakhstan) A Bublik	3	6^{4}
3	(Poland) H Hurkacz	5	7^{9}	3
(Hungary) M Fucsovics	7	6^{7}	6
(Australia) N Kyrgios	6^{4}	6	6
5	(Georgia (country)) N Basilashvili	7^{7}	4	3

Quarterfinals
1/WC	(Greece) S Tsitsipas	6^{4}	3
(United Kingdom) A Murray	7^{7}	6
(Hungary) M Fucsovics	6^{3}	0^{r}
(Australia) N Kyrgios	7^{7}	3

Semifinals
(United Kingdom) A Murray	7^{7}	6
(Australia) N Kyrgios	6^{5}	2

=== Bottom half ===
First round
8	(France) U Humbert	6	6^{4}	4
(France) A Rinderknech	4	7^{7}	6
(France) B Bonzi	6	6
WC	(Spain) F López	4	1
(Germany) O Otte	7^{7}	7^{7}
(Germany) D Altmaier	6^{2}	6^{4}
6	(Italy) L Sonego	7	6
(France) B Paire	5	2
(United States) M Giron	5	7	6^{8}
WC	(Germany) J-L Struff	7	5	7^{10}
Q	(Moldova) R Albot	6	7^{9}
(Portugal) J Sousa	2	6^{7}

Second round
(France) A Rinderknech	6^{3}	2
(France) B Bonzi	7^{7}	6
(Germany) O Otte	7^{8}	7^{7}
4	(Canada) D Shapovalov	6^{6}	6^{4}
6	(Italy) L Sonego	7^{7}	7^{7}
WC	(Germany) J-L Struff	6^{2}	6^{4}
Q	(Moldova) R Albot	2	6	3
2	(Italy) M Berrettini	6	4	6

Quarterfinals
(France) B Bonzi
(Germany) O Otte	w/o
6	(Italy) L Sonego	6	3	4
2	(Italy) M Berrettini	3	6	6

Semifinals
(Germany) O Otte	6^{7}	6^{5}
2	(Italy) M Berrettini	7^{9}	7^{7}

== Qualifying ==
=== Seeds ===
1. Aslan Karatsev (first round)
2. (France) Quentin Halys (qualifying competition, retired)
3. (Germany) Peter Gojowczyk (qualifying competition)
4. (Germany) Yannick Hanfmann (first round)
5. (Spain) Feliciano López (received wildcard to main draw)
6. (Germany) Mats Moraing (qualifying competition)
7. (Australia) Christopher O'Connell (qualified)
8. (Moldova) Radu Albot (qualified)

=== Qualifiers ===
1. (Switzerland) Dominic Stricker
2. (Moldova) Radu Albot
3. (Australia) Christopher O'Connell
4. (Austria) Jurij Rodionov

=== Draw ===
==== First qualifier ====
First round
1	Aslan Karatsev	6^{2}	1
(Switzerland) Dominic Stricker	7^{7}	6
WC	(Germany) Jannik Maute	1	6^{5}
6	(Germany) Mats Moraing	6	7^{7}

Qualifying competition
(Switzerland) Dominic Stricker	6	6
6	(Germany) Mats Moraing	4	3

==== Second qualifier ====
First round
2	(France) Quentin Halys	6	6
WC	(Germany) Marko Topo	3	3
Alt	(Germany) Oscar Moraing	3	4
8	(Moldova) Radu Albot	6	6

Qualifying competition
2	(France) Quentin Halys	2^{r}
8	(Moldova) Radu Albot	1

==== Third qualifier ====
First round
3	(Germany) Peter Gojowczyk	6	6
(Turkey) Cem İlkel	3	1
(Germany) Daniel Masur	6^{6}	5
7	(Australia) Christopher O'Connell	7^{8}	7

Qualifying competition
3	(Germany) Peter Gojowczyk	3	4
7	(Australia) Christopher O'Connell	6	6

==== Fourth qualifier ====
First round
4	(Germany) Yannick Hanfmann	1	6^{4}
Roman Safiullin	6	7^{7}
(Austria) Jurij Rodionov	6	6
Alt	(Poland) Mateusz Terczyński	2	3

Qualifying competition
Roman Safiullin	5	6	6^{6}
(Austria) Jurij Rodionov	7	3	7^{8}
