= 2012 MercedesCup – Singles =

Singles
- 2012 MercedesCup

Final
- Champion: (Serbia) Janko Tipsarević
- Runner-up: (Argentina) Juan Mónaco
- Score: 6–4, 5–7, 6–3

Details
- Draw: 28
- Seeds: 8

Events
| Singles | Doubles |
- Stuttgart Open

Juan Carlos Ferrero was the defending champion but chose to compete in Umag.
First-seeded Janko Tipsarević won the title against Juan Mónaco after defeating him in the final with 6–4, 5–7, 6–3.

== Seeds ==
The top four seeds receive a bye into the second round.

1. (Serbia) Janko Tipsarević (champion)
2. (Argentina) Juan Mónaco (final)
3. (Australia) Bernard Tomic (second round)
4. (Spain) Pablo Andújar (second round)
5. (Netherlands) Robin Haase (first round)
6. (Russia) Nikolay Davydenko (first round)
7. (Poland) Łukasz Kubot (first round)
8. (Germany) Tommy Haas (second round)

== Draw ==
Key

- Q = Qualifier
- WC = Wild card
- LL = Lucky loser
- Alt = Alternate
- ITF = ITF entry
- PR = Protected ranking
- SR = Special ranking
- SE = Special exempt
- JE = Junior exempt
- JR = Junior Accelerator Programme entrant
- CO = College Accelerator Programme entrant
- NG = Next Gen Accelerator Program entrant
- w/o = Walkover
- r = Retired
- d = Defaulted

=== Finals ===
Semifinals
1 | (Serbia) Janko Tipsarević | 6 | 2 | 6
(Brazil) Thomaz Bellucci | 4 | 6 | 4
(Spain) Guillermo García López | 3 | 6 | 5
2 | (Argentina) Juan Mónaco | 6 | 3 | 7

Final
1 | (Serbia) Janko Tipsarević | 6 | 5 | 6
2 | (Argentina) Juan Mónaco | 4 | 7 | 3

=== Top half ===
First round
(Belgium) S Darcis | 6 | 6
(Spain) A Montañés | 2 | 4
(Germany) B Phau | 6 | 6
Q | (Austria) M Fischer | 3 | 3
(Czech Republic) L Rosol | 6 | 7
5 | (Netherlands) R Haase | 4 | 5
(Brazil) T Bellucci | 7^{7} | 6
WC | (Germany) R Kern | 6^{3} | 2
Q | (Germany) J Reister | 2 | 4
(France) J Chardy | 6 | 6
(Germany) C-M Stebe | 6 | 0 | 6
7 | (Poland) Ł Kubot | 2 | 6 | 3

Second round
1 | (Serbia) J Tipsarević | 6 | 6
(Belgium) S Darcis | 4 | 2
(Germany) B Phau | 7^{7} | 7^{7}
(Czech Republic) L Rosol | 6^{3} | 6^{2}
3 | (Australia) B Tomic | 6^{6} | 3
(Brazil) T Bellucci | 7^{8} | 6
(France) J Chardy | 6 | 6^{8} | 3
(Germany) C-M Stebe | 4 | 7^{10} | 6

Quarterfinals
1 | (Serbia) J Tipsarević | 6^{6} | 7^{7} | 6
(Germany) B Phau | 7^{8} | 6^{2} | 4
(Brazil) T Bellucci | 6 | 6
(Germany) C-M Stebe | 4 | 1

Semifinals
1 | (Serbia) J Tipsarević | 6 | 2 | 6
(Brazil) T Bellucci | 4 | 6 | 4

=== Bottom half ===
First round
6 | (Russia) N Davydenko | 5 | 6 | 6^{7}
WC | (Germany) D Brown | 7 | 3 | 7^{9}
(France) B Paire | 7^{7} | 6
LL | (Argentina) E Schwank | 6^{5} | 4
(Spain) G García López | 6 | 6
(Spain) R Ramírez Hidalgo | 2 | 3
8/WC | (Germany) T Haas | 4 | 6 | 6
Q | (Russia) I Andreev | 6 | 2 | 2
(Ukraine) S Stakhovsky | 1 | 6 | 1
Q | (Slovakia) P Červenák | 6 | 4 | 6
(Italy) F Cipolla | 3 | 4
(Germany) T Kamke | 6 | 6

Second round
WC | (Germany) D Brown | 7^{7} | 4 | 6
(France) B Paire | 6^{4} | 6 | 1
(Spain) G García López | 6 | 4 | 6
4 | (Spain) P Andújar | 1 | 6 | 1
8/WC | (Germany) T Haas | 4 | 4
Q | (Slovakia) P Červenák | 6 | 6
(Germany) T Kamke | 2 | 3
2 | (Argentina) J Mónaco | 6 | 6

Quarterfinals
WC | (Germany) D Brown | 0 | 3
(Spain) G García López | 6 | 6
Q | (Slovakia) P Červenák | 1 | 5
2 | (Argentina) J Mónaco | 6 | 7

Semifinals
(Spain) G García López | 3 | 6 | 5
2 | (Argentina) J Mónaco | 6 | 3 | 7

== Qualifying ==
=== Seeds ===
The top two seeds receive a bye into the second round.

1. (Russia) Igor Andreev (qualified)
2. (Argentina) Eduardo Schwank (qualifying competition, lucky loser)
3. (Kazakhstan) Andrey Golubev (second round)
4. (France) Josselin Ouanna (qualifying competition)
5. (Colombia) Robert Farah (qualifying competition)
6. (Slovakia) Pavol Červenák (qualified)
7. (Austria) Martin Fischer (qualified)
8. (Uzbekistan) Farrukh Dustov (qualifying competition)

=== Qualifiers ===
1. (Russia) Igor Andreev
2. (Austria) Martin Fischer
3. (Germany) Julian Reister
4. (Slovakia) Pavol Červenák

=== Lucky loser ===
1. (Argentina) Eduardo Schwank

=== Draw ===
==== First qualifier ====
First round
(Croatia) Blaz Seric | w/o
(Spain) Ivan Gómez Mantilla
(Germany) Pascal Meis | 7^{7} | 3 | 4
WC | (Bosnia and Herzegovina) Elmar Ejupovic | 6^{5} | 6 | 6
(New Zealand) Artem Sitak | 2 | 0
5 | (Colombia) Robert Farah | 6 | 6

Second round
1 | (Russia) Igor Andreev | 6 | 6
(Croatia) Blaz Seric | 3 | 3
WC | (Bosnia and Herzegovina) Elmar Ejupovic | 3 | 4
5 | (Colombia) Robert Farah | 6 | 6

Qualifying competition
1 | (Russia) Igor Andreev | 7^{7} | 7
5 | (Colombia) Robert Farah | 6^{4} | 5

==== Second qualifier ====
First round
WC | (Germany) Christian Wickenhäuser | 3 | 0
(Colombia) Juan Sebastián Cabal | 6 | 6
(Austria) Maximilian Neuchrist | 7^{7} | 6
(Germany) Bastian Knittel | 6^{5} | 4
(Germany) Sebastian Sachs | 4 | 3
7 | (Austria) Martin Fischer | 6 | 6

Second round
2 | (Argentina) Eduardo Schwank | 5 | 7 | 6
(Colombia) Juan Sebastián Cabal | 7 | 5 | 3
(Austria) Maximilian Neuchrist | 2 | 4
7 | (Austria) Martin Fischer | 6 | 6

Qualifying competition
2 | (Argentina) Eduardo Schwank | 5 | 1
7 | (Austria) Martin Fischer | 7 | 6

==== Third qualifier ====
First round
3 | (Kazakhstan) Andrey Golubev | 6 | 6
(Germany) Jan-Lennard Struff | 4 | 2
(Germany) Julian Reister | 6 | 7^{10}
(Switzerland) Stéphane Bohli | 2 | 6^{8}
(Croatia) Neven Krivokuća | 2 | 2
WC | (Russia) Evgeny Karlovskiy | 6 | 6
(Germany) Jeremy Jahn | 6 | 2 | 4
8 | (Uzbekistan) Farrukh Dustov | 4 | 6 | 6

Second round
3 | (Kazakhstan) Andrey Golubev | 6^{9} | 1
(Germany) Julian Reister | 7^{11} | 6
WC | (Russia) Evgeny Karlovskiy | 4 | 2
8 | (Uzbekistan) Farrukh Dustov | 6 | 6

Qualifying competition
(Germany) Julian Reister | 6 | 6
8 | (Uzbekistan) Farrukh Dustov | 1 | 4

==== Fourth qualifier ====
First round
4 | (France) Josselin Ouanna | 6 | 6
(Russia) Evgeny Kirillov | 3 | 4
(Brazil) André Sá | 6 | 6
WC | (Germany) Yannick Offermanns | 4 | 0
(Australia) James Lemke | 7^{7} | 6
(Germany) Florian Fallert | 6^{1} | 4
(Germany) Nils Langer | 2 | 3
6 | (Slovakia) Pavol Červenák | 6 | 6

Second round
4 | (France) Josselin Ouanna | 2
(Brazil) André Sá | 1^{r}
(Australia) James Lemke | 2 | 6 | 1
6 | (Slovakia) Pavol Červenák | 6 | 4 | 6

Qualifying competition
4 | (France) Josselin Ouanna | 6 | 4 | 6^{7}
6 | (Slovakia) Pavol Červenák | 4 | 6 | 7^{9}
