= 2000 Mercedes Cup – Doubles =

Doubles
- 2000 Mercedes Cup

Final
- Champion: (Czech Republic) Jiří Novák (Czech Republic) David Rikl
- Runner-up: (Argentina) Lucas Arnold Ker (United States) Donald Johnson
- Score: 5–7, 6–2, 6–3

Details
- Draw: 16
- Seeds: 4

Events
Singles	Doubles
- Stuttgart Open

Jaime Oncins and Daniel Orsanic were the defending champions, but lost in first round to Magnus Norman and Marat Safin.

Jiří Novák and David Rikl won the title by defeating Lucas Arnold Ker and Donald Johnson 5–7, 6–2, 6–3 in the final.

== Seeds ==
1. (Czech Republic) Jiří Novák / (Czech Republic) David Rikl (champions)
2. (n/a)
3. (South Africa) David Adams / (Russia) Andrei Olhovskiy (semifinals)
4. (Brazil) Jaime Oncins / (Argentina) Daniel Orsanic (first round)

== Draw ==
Key

- Q = Qualifier
- WC = Wild card
- LL = Lucky loser
- Alt = Alternate
- ITF = ITF entry
- PR = Protected ranking
- SR = Special ranking
- SE = Special exempt
- JE = Junior exempt
- JR = Junior Accelerator Programme entrant
- CO = College Accelerator Programme entrant
- NG = Next Gen Accelerator Program entrant
- w/o = Walkover
- r = Retired
- d = Defaulted

=== Draw ===
First round
1	(Czech Republic) J Novák (Czech Republic) D Rikl	6	6
(Germany) MK Goellner (South Africa) C Haggard	3	4
(Spain) JI Carrasco (United States) J Waite	4	6	7
(North Macedonia) A Kitinov (Czech Republic) C Suk	6	3	5
3	(South Africa) D Adams (Russia) A Olhovskiy	3	7^{12}	6
(France) J Boutter (Sweden) P Nyborg	6	6^{10}	3
WC	(Germany) M Kohlmann (Germany) R Schüttler	6^{3}	6	7^{7}
(Australia) J Eagle (Australia) A Florent	7^{7}	2	6^{4}
(Spain) T Carbonell (Spain) J Velasco Jr.	4	4
(Argentina) L Arnold Ker (United States) D Johnson	6	6
WC	(Sweden) M Norman (Russia) M Safin	7^{9}	3	6
4	(Brazil) J Oncins (Argentina) D Orsanic	6^{7}	6	3
Q	(Czech Republic) S Doseděl (Czech Republic) P Luxa	1	6	5
(Sweden) S Aspelin (Sweden) J Landsberg	6	4	7
WC	(Germany) K Braasch (Germany) B Karbacher	6^{4}	1
LL	(Czech Republic) D Miketa (Czech Republic) D Škoch	7^{7}	6

Quarterfinals
1	(Czech Republic) J Novák (Czech Republic) D Rikl	6	6
(Spain) JI Carrasco (United States) J Waite	4	3
3	(South Africa) D Adams (Russia) A Olhovskiy	6	3	7
WC	(Germany) M Kohlmann (Germany) R Schüttler	4	6	5
(Argentina) L Arnold Ker (United States) D Johnson	3	6	6
WC	(Sweden) M Norman (Russia) M Safin	6	3	2
(Sweden) S Aspelin (Sweden) J Landsberg	6	6
LL	(Czech Republic) D Miketa (Czech Republic) D Škoch	3	1

Semifinals
1	(Czech Republic) J Novák (Czech Republic) D Rikl	6	6
3	(South Africa) D Adams (Russia) A Olhovskiy	3	2
(Argentina) L Arnold Ker (United States) D Johnson	3	6	6
(Sweden) S Aspelin (Sweden) J Landsberg	6	3	3

Final
1	(Czech Republic) J Novák (Czech Republic) D Rikl	5	6	6
(Argentina) L Arnold Ker (United States) D Johnson	7	2	3
