= 2010 MercedesCup – Singles =

Singles
- 2010 MercedesCup

Final
- Champion: (Spain) Albert Montañés
- Runner-up: (France) Gaël Monfils
- Score: 6–2, 1–2, ret.

Details
- Draw: 28
- Seeds: 8

Events
Singles	Doubles
- MercedesCup

Jérémy Chardy was the defending champion; however, he lost to Daniel Gimeno Traver in the first round.
Fifth-seeded Albert Montañés became the new champion, after his victory against Gaël Monfils in the final. Monfils retired during the second set.

== Seeds ==
The top four seeds receive a bye into the second round.

1. (Russia) Nikolay Davydenko (second round)
2. (Austria) Jürgen Melzer (quarterfinals)
3. (France) Gaël Monfils (final, retired due to an ankle injury)
4. (Spain) Juan Carlos Ferrero (semifinals)
5. (Spain) Albert Montañés (champion)
6. (Germany) Philipp Kohlschreiber (first round)
7. (France) Gilles Simon (second round)
8. (Romania) Victor Hănescu (first round)

== Draw ==
Key

- Q = Qualifier
- WC = Wild card
- LL = Lucky loser
- Alt = Alternate
- ITF = ITF entry
- PR = Protected ranking
- SR = Special ranking
- SE = Special exempt
- JE = Junior exempt
- JR = Junior Accelerator Programme entrant
- CO = College Accelerator Programme entrant
- NG = Next Gen Accelerator Program entrant
- w/o = Walkover
- r = Retired
- d = Defaulted

=== Finals ===
Semifinals
(Spain) Daniel Gimeno Traver	4	6	0
3	(France) Gaël Monfils	6	4	6
4	(Spain) Juan Carlos Ferrero	3	6^{6}
5	(Spain) Albert Montañés	6	7

Final
3	(France) Gaël Monfils	2	2^{r}
5	(Spain) Albert Montañés	6	1

=== Top half ===
First round
(Spain) D Gimeno Traver	7	6^{6}	6
(France) J Chardy	5	7	3
Q	(Romania) V Crivoi	2	3
WC	(Germany) B Phau	6	6
(Switzerland) M Chiudinelli	7	6
8	(Romania) V Hănescu	6^{4}	3
Q	(Germany) B Knittel	6	4	3
Q	(Spain) P Andújar	4	6	6
Q	(Spain) I Navarro	6	3	2
(Spain) G García López	4	6	6
(Germany) F Mayer	6	6
6	(Germany) P Kohlschreiber	4	2

Second round
1	(Russia) N Davydenko	6^{7}	6	1
(Spain) D Gimeno Traver	7	2	6
WC	(Germany) B Phau	6^{3}	3
(Switzerland) M Chiudinelli	7	6
3	(France) G Monfils	6	5	6
Q	(Spain) P Andújar	4	7	4
(Spain) G García López	3	1
(Germany) F Mayer	6	6

Quarterfinals
(Spain) D Gimeno Traver	6	6
(Switzerland) M Chiudinelli	1	3
3	(France) G Monfils	5	6	6
(Germany) F Mayer	7	3	4

Semifinals
(Spain) D Gimeno Traver	4	6	0
3	(France) G Monfils	6	4	6

=== Bottom half ===
First round
7	(France) G Simon	6	3	7
WC	(Jamaica) D Brown	3	6	6^{1}
(Germany) S Greul	7	6
(Germany) M Berrer	6^{6}	4
(Germany) A Beck	4	5
(Argentina) H Zeballos	6	7
5	(Spain) A Montañés	2	7	6
(Germany) P Petzschner	6	5	2
(Argentina) JI Chela	6	7
(Argentina) E Schwank	2	5
WC	(Germany) M Zverev	6	6
(Ukraine) S Stakhovsky	4	3

Second round
7	(France) G Simon	4	5
(Germany) S Greul	6	7
(Argentina) H Zeballos	7	6^{3}	2
4	(Spain) JC Ferrero	6^{1}	7	6
5	(Spain) A Montañés	7	3	6
(Argentina) JI Chela	5	6	2
WC	(Germany) M Zverev	5	5
2	(Austria) J Melzer	7	7

Quarterfinals
(Germany) S Greul	3	5
4	(Spain) JC Ferrero	6	7
5	(Spain) A Montañés	6	6
2	(Austria) J Melzer	4	1

Semifinals
4	(Spain) JC Ferrero	3	6^{6}
5	(Spain) A Montañés	6	7
