= 2006 Mercedes Cup =

- Date: 17–23 July
- Edition: 29th
- Category: International Series Gold
- Draw: 48S / 16D
- Prize money: $665,000
- Surface: Clay / outdoor
- Location: Stuttgart, Germany
- Venue: Tennis Club Weissenhof

Champions

Singles
- (Spain) David Ferrer

Doubles
- (Argentina) Gastón Gaudio / (Belarus) Max Mirnyi
- Stuttgart Open

The 2006 Mercedes Cup was the 2006 edition of the Mercedes Cup men's tennis tournament and was part of the International Series Gold of the 2006 ATP Tour. It was the 29th edition of the tournament and was held from 17 until 23 July 2006 at the Tennis Club Weissenhof in Stuttgart, Germany. Third-seeded David Ferrer won his first title of the year, and second of his career.

== Finals ==
=== Singles ===
(Spain) David Ferrer defeated (Argentina) José Acasuso, 6–4, 3–6, 6–7^{(3–7)}, 7–5, 6–4

=== Doubles ===
(Argentina) Gastón Gaudio / (Belarus) Max Mirnyi defeated (Switzerland) Yves Allegro / (Sweden) Robert Lindstedt 7–5, 6–7^{(4–7)}, [12–10]
