= 2000 Mercedes Cup – Singles =

Singles
- 2000 Mercedes Cup

Final
- Champion: (Argentina) Franco Squillari
- Runner-up: (Argentina) Gastón Gaudio
- Score: 6–2, 3–6, 4–6, 6–4, 6–2

Details
- Draw: 32
- Seeds: 8

Events
Singles	Doubles
- Stuttgart Open

Magnus Norman was the defending champion, but lost to Daniel Elsner in the second round.

Fifth-seeded Franco Squillari won the title, defeating Gastón Gaudio 6–2, 3–6, 4–6, 6–4, 6–2 in the final.

== Seeds ==
1. (Sweden) Magnus Norman (second round)
2. (Russia) Yevgeny Kafelnikov (second round)
3. (Russia) Marat Safin (second round)
4. (Morocco) Younes El Aynaoui (second round)
5. (Argentina) Franco Squillari (champion)
6. (Germany) Tommy Haas (second round, retired)
7. (Morocco) Karim Alami (second round)
8. (Slovakia) Dominik Hrbatý (first round)

== Draw ==
Key

- Q = Qualifier
- WC = Wild card
- LL = Lucky loser
- Alt = Alternate
- ITF = ITF entry
- PR = Protected ranking
- SR = Special ranking
- SE = Special exempt
- JE = Junior exempt
- JR = Junior Accelerator Programme entrant
- CO = College Accelerator Programme entrant
- NG = Next Gen Accelerator Program entrant
- w/o = Walkover
- r = Retired
- d = Defaulted

=== Finals ===
Semifinals
WC	(Germany) Daniel Elsner	6^{6}	6^{5}
5	(Argentina) Franco Squillari	7^{8}	7^{7}
(Australia) Andrew Ilie	2	4
(Argentina) Gastón Gaudio	6	6

Final
5	(Argentina) Franco Squillari	6	3	4	6	6
(Argentina) Gastón Gaudio	2	6	6	4	2

=== Top half ===
First round
1	(Sweden) M Norman	6	6
WC	(Germany) B Phau	2	2
(Spain) F Clavet	4	6	3
WC	(Germany) D Elsner	6	4	6
(Brazil) F Meligeni	6	6
(Germany) M Hantschk	1	2
(Czech Republic) J Novák	6	7
8	(Slovakia) D Hrbatý	3	5
4	(Morocco) Y El Aynaoui	6	7^{10}
WC	(Germany) C Vinck	1	6^{8}
(Slovakia) K Kučera	6	6
(Czech Republic) S Doseděl	2	1
Q	(Czech Republic) J Hernych	1	3
Q	(Germany) M-K Goellner	6	6
LL	(Chile) F González	1	3
5	(Argentina) F Squillari	6	6

Second round
1	(Sweden) M Norman	6	6^{2}	4
WC	(Germany) D Elsner	4	7^{7}	6
(Brazil) F Meligeni	3	2
(Czech Republic) J Novák	6	6
4	(Morocco) Y El Aynaoui	3	2
(Slovakia) K Kučera	6	6
Q	(Germany) M-K Goellner	6	2	3
5	(Argentina) F Squillari	4	6	6

Quarterfinals
WC	(Germany) D Elsner	6	6
(Czech Republic) J Novák	2	1
(Slovakia) K Kučera	5	1
5	(Argentina) F Squillari	7	6

Semifinals
WC	(Germany) D Elsner	6^{6}	6^{5}
5	(Argentina) F Squillari	7^{8}	7^{7}

=== Bottom half ===
First round
6	(Germany) T Haas	3	7	6
Q	(Czech Republic) D Miketa	6	5	2
(Germany) R Schüttler	6	4	6
(Spain) F Vicente	4	6	3
(Morocco) H Arazi	6	2	6^{5}
(Australia) A Ilie	4	6	7^{7}
(Romania) A Pavel	7	3	3
3	(Russia) M Safin	5	6	6
7	(Morocco) K Alami	0	7^{7}	6
(Sweden) F Jonsson	6	6^{5}	2
(Spain) J Díaz	2	5
(Argentina) G Gaudio	6	7
(Ukraine) A Medvedev	6	6
Q	(Germany) B Karbacher	3	2
(France) J Boutter	6^{3}	7^{7}	6^{6}
2	(Russia) Y Kafelnikov	7^{7}	6^{5}	7^{8}

Second round
6	(Germany) T Haas	5	1^{r}
(Germany) R Schüttler	7	2
(Australia) A Ilie	7^{7}	7^{7}
3	(Russia) M Safin	6^{4}	6^{4}
7	(Morocco) K Alami	7	3	4
(Argentina) G Gaudio	5	6	6
(Ukraine) A Medvedev	6^{4}	7	6
2	(Russia) Y Kafelnikov	7^{7}	5	3

Quarterfinals
(Germany) R Schüttler	3	4
(Australia) A Ilie	6	6
(Argentina) G Gaudio	6	7^{7}
(Ukraine) A Medvedev	1	6^{3}

Semifinals
(Australia) A Ilie	2	4
(Argentina) G Gaudio	6	6
