= 2013 MercedesCup – Doubles =

Doubles
- 2013 MercedesCup

Final
- Champion: (Argentina) Facundo Bagnis (Brazil) Thomaz Bellucci
- Runner-up: (Poland) Tomasz Bednarek (Poland) Mateusz Kowalczyk
- Score: 2–6, 6–4, [11–9]

Details
- Draw: 16
- Seeds: 4

Events
Singles	Doubles
← 2012 ·	Stuttgart Open	· 2014 →

Jérémy Chardy and Łukasz Kubot were the defending champions, but decided not to participate.
Facundo Bagnis and Thomaz Bellucci won the title, defeating Tomasz Bednarek and Mateusz Kowalczyk in the final, 2–6, 6–4, [11–9].

== Seeds ==
1. (Spain) Marcel Granollers / (Spain) Marc López (first round)
2. (Germany) Andre Begemann / (Germany) Martin Emmrich (first round)
3. (United Kingdom) Jamie Murray / (Australia) John Peers (first round)
4. (Germany) Dustin Brown / (Australia) Paul Hanley (semifinals)

== Draw ==
=== Key ===
- Q = Qualifier
- WC = Wild card
- LL = Lucky loser
- Alt = Alternate
- SE = Special exempt
- PR = Protected ranking
- ITF = ITF entry
- JE = Junior exempt
- w/o = Walkover
- r = Retired
- d = Defaulted
- SR = Special ranking

=== Draw ===
First round
1	(Spain) M Granollers (Spain) M López	6	6^{5}	[7]
(Argentina) F Bagnis (Brazil) T Bellucci	2	7^{7}	[10]
WC	(Germany) T Haas (Germany) R Kern	6	6
(France) P-H Mathieu (France) B Paire	3	3
4	(Germany) D Brown (Australia) P Hanley	6	7^{7}
(Spain) D Gimeno-Traver (Argentina) L Mayer	4	6^{5}
(Romania) F Mergea (Czech Republic) L Rosol	6	6
(Austria) O Marach (France) G Monfils	4	4
(Italy) F Fognini (Spain) D Muñoz de la Nava	4	3
WC	(Germany) A Beck (Germany) M Berrer	6	6
(Sweden) A Siljeström (Slovakia) I Zelenay	3	6	[10]
3	(United Kingdom) J Murray (Australia) J Peers	6	2	[6]
(Russia) N Davydenko (Russia) D Tursunov	3	7^{7}	[7]
(Czech Republic) L Dlouhý (Slovakia) M Kližan	6	6^{3}	[10]
(Poland) T Bednarek (Poland) M Kowalczyk	6	6
2	(Germany) A Begemann (Germany) M Emmrich	3	3

Quarterfinals
(Argentina) F Bagnis (Brazil) T Bellucci	6	7
WC	(Germany) T Haas (Germany) R Kern	2	5
4	(Germany) D Brown (Australia) P Hanley	6	3	[10]
(Romania) F Mergea (Czech Republic) L Rosol	4	6	[7]
WC	(Germany) A Beck (Germany) M Berrer	6^{3}	6	[10]
(Sweden) A Siljeström (Slovakia) I Zelenay	7^{7}	4	[6]
(Czech Republic) L Dlouhý (Slovakia) M Kližan	6^{5}	6	[4]
(Poland) T Bednarek (Poland) M Kowalczyk	7^{7}	4	[10]

Semifinals
(Argentina) F Bagnis (Brazil) T Bellucci	6^{3}	6	[10]
4	(Germany) D Brown (Australia) P Hanley	7^{7}	4	[6]
WC	(Germany) A Beck (Germany) M Berrer
(Poland) T Bednarek (Poland) M Kowalczyk	w/o

Final
(Argentina) F Bagnis (Brazil) T Bellucci	2	6	[11]
(Poland) T Bednarek (Poland) M Kowalczyk	6	4	[9]
