= 2007 MercedesCup – Singles =

Singles
- 2007 Stuttgart Open

Final
- Champion: (Spain) Rafael Nadal
- Runner-up: (Switzerland) Stanislas Wawrinka
- Score: 6–4, 7–5

Details
- Draw: 32 (4Q / 3WC)
- Seeds: 8

Events
| Singles | Doubles |
- Stuttgart Open

The MercedesCup – Singles event of the 2007 Stuttgart Open tennis championship (also known as the Mercedes Cup) took place in Stuttgart, Germany, from 16 to 22 July 2007. Thirty-two players from twelve countries competed in the five-round tournament. The final winner was first-seeded Rafael Nadal of Spain, who defeated Stanislas Wawrinka of Switzerland. The defending champion from 2006, David Ferrer, was eliminated in the second round.

== Seeds ==
1. (Spain) Rafael Nadal (champion)
2. (Spain) Tommy Robredo (first round)
3. (Czech Republic) Tomáš Berdych (second round)
4. (Spain) David Ferrer (second round)
5. (Argentina) Guillermo Cañas (first round)
6. (Spain) Juan Carlos Ferrero (quarterfinals)
7. (Argentina) Juan Ignacio Chela (semifinals)
8. (Argentina) Juan Mónaco (quarterfinals)

== Draws ==
=== Key ===
- Q - Qualifier
- WC - Wild Card
- r - Retired

=== Finals ===
| Semifinals | | | | | Finals |
| 1 | (Spain) Rafael Nadal | 6 | 7 |
| | (Spain) Feliciano López | 1 | 5 | | 1 | (Spain) Rafael Nadal | 6 | 7 |
| 7 | (Argentina) Juan Ignacio Chela | 7 | 4 | 1 | | (Switzerland) Stanislas Wawrinka | 4 | 5 |
| | (Switzerland) Stanislas Wawrinka | 6^{2} | 6 | 6 |

=== Section 1 ===
First round
1 | (Spain) R Nadal | 6 | 6
WC | (Germany) A Waske | 1 | 1
WC | (Germany) S Greul | 1 | 2
(Germany) P Kohlschreiber | 6 | 6
(Austria) S Koubek | 6 | 7
(Argentina) J Acasuso | 2 | 5
(Czech Republic) J Hernych | 2 | 1
8 | (Argentina) J Mónaco | 6 | 6
3 | (Czech Republic) T Berdych | 6 | 6
(Ecuador) N Lapentti | 1 | 1
(Argentina) C Berlocq | 7 | 6^{7} | 4
(Spain) F López | 6^{5} | 7 | 6
(Czech Republic) J Hájek | 4 | 2
(Argentina) D Hartfield | 6 | 6
(Argentina) G Gaudio | 1 | 2
6 | (Spain) J C Ferrero | 6 | 6

Second round
1 | (Spain) R Nadal | 6 | 6
(Germany) P Kohlschreiber | 3 | 3
(Austria) S Koubek | 2 | 6 | 3
8 | (Argentina) J Mónaco | 6 | 3 | 6
3 | (Czech Republic) T Berdych | 0 | 3
(Spain) F López | 6 | 6
(Argentina) D Hartfield | 4 | 6 | 3
6 | (Spain) J C Ferrero | 6 | 1 | 6

Quarterfinals
1 | (Spain) R Nadal | 6 | 6
8 | (Argentina) J Mónaco | 1 | 3
(Spain) F López | 6 | 3 | 6
6 | (Spain) J C Ferrero | 4 | 6 | 4

Semifinals
1 | (Spain) R Nadal | 6 | 7
(Spain) F López | 1 | 5

=== Section 2 ===
First round
7 | (Argentina) J I Chela | 6 | 6
(Belarus) M Mirnyi | 3 | 3
Q | (Serbia) B Pašanski | 1 | 6 | 6
(Spain) G García López | 6 | 2 | 4
(Spain) F Verdasco | 6 | 6
(Germany) F Mayer | 3 | 2
Q | (Slovakia) L Lacko | 2 | 2
4 | (Spain) D Ferrer | 6 | 6
5 | (Argentina) G Cañas | 7 | 2 | 0^{r}
(Switzerland) S Wawrinka | 6^{5} | 6 | 1
Q | (Croatia) M Čilić | 6 | 6
(Germany) B Becker | 3 | 2
Q | (Czech Republic) J Vaněk | 6 | 6
(Spain) I Navarro | 1 | 1
(France) G Monfils | 7 | 6
2/WC | (Spain) T Robredo | 6^{5} | 2

Second round
7 | (Argentina) J I Chela | 7 | 4 | 6
Q | (Serbia) B Pašanski | 5 | 6 | 4
(Spain) F Verdasco | 7 | 6
4 | (Spain) D Ferrer | 5 | 3
(Switzerland) S Wawrinka | 6 | 6
Q | (Croatia) M Čilić | 4 | 1
Q | (Czech Republic) J Vaněk | 1 | 7 | 6
(France) G Monfils | 6 | 6^{4} | 2

Quarterfinals
7 | (Argentina) J I Chela | 2 | 6 | 6
(Spain) F Verdasco | 6 | 3 | 2
(Switzerland) S Wawrinka | 6 | 6
Q | (Czech Republic) J Vaněk | 1 | 4

Semifinals
7 | (Argentina) J I Chela | 7 | 4 | 1
(Switzerland) S Wawrinka | 6^{2} | 6 | 6
