= 2007 MercedesCup – Doubles =

Doubles
- 2007 Stuttgart Open

Final
- Champion: (Czech Republic) František Čermák (Czech Republic) Leoš Friedl
- Runner-up: (Spain) Guillermo García-López (Spain) Fernando Verdasco
- Score: 6–4, 6–4

Details
- Draw: 16
- Seeds: 4

Events
| Singles | Doubles |
| ← 2006 · | Stuttgart Open | · 2008 → |

Gastón Gaudio and Max Mirnyi were the defending champions, but Gaudio did not compete this year to focus on the singles tournament. Mirnyi teamed up with Mischa Zverev and lost in first round to tournament runners-up Guillermo García-López and Fernando Verdasco.

František Čermák and Leoš Friedl won the tournament by defeating García-López and Verdasco 6–4, 6–4 in the final.

== Seeds ==
1. (Sweden) Simon Aspelin / (Austria) Julian Knowle (quarterfinals)
2. (Romania) Andrei Pavel / (Germany) Alexander Waske (semifinals)
3. (Czech Republic) Jaroslav Levinský / (Czech Republic) David Škoch (first round)
4. (Czech Republic) Petr Pála / (Czech Republic) Pavel Vízner (first round)

== Draw ==
=== Key ===
- Q = Qualifier
- WC = Wild card
- LL = Lucky loser
- Alt = Alternate
- SE = Special exempt
- PR = Protected ranking
- ITF = ITF entry
- JE = Junior exempt
- w/o = Walkover
- r = Retired
- d = Defaulted
- SR = Special ranking

=== Draw ===
First round
1 | (Sweden) S Aspelin (Austria) J Knowle | 6 | 6
(Spain) I Navarro Pastor (Switzerland) S Wawrinka | 4 | 2
(Belarus) M Mirnyi (Germany) M Zverev | 3 | 3
(Spain) G García-López (Spain) F Verdasco | 6 | 6
4 | (Czech Republic) P Pála (Czech Republic) P Vízner | 3 | 4
(Germany) P Kohlschreiber (Austria) S Koubek | 6 | 6
(Argentina) J Acasuso (Argentina) J Mónaco | 6 | 6
Alt | (United States) H Armando (Argentina) D Hartfield | 1 | 4
(Czech Republic) F Čermák (Czech Republic) L Friedl | 6 | 6
WC | (Austria) Herbert Jerich (Austria) P Schmölzer | 2 | 1
(Argentina) M García (Argentina) S Prieto | 6 | 6
3 | (Czech Republic) J Levinský (Czech Republic) D Škoch | 3 | 3
(Ecuador) N Lapentti (Spain) F López | 6 | 6^{5} | [8]
WC | (Germany) A Beck (Germany) T Popp | 3 | 7^{7} | [10]
(Argentina) C Berlocq (Czech Republic) T Cibulec | 5 | 2
2 | (Romania) A Pavel (Germany) A Waske | 7 | 6

Quarterfinals
1 | (Sweden) S Aspelin (Austria) J Knowle | 6^{2} | 0
(Spain) G García-López (Spain) F Verdasco | 7^{7} | 6
(Germany) P Kohlschreiber (Austria) S Koubek | 6^{5} | 2
(Argentina) J Acasuso (Argentina) J Mónaco | 7^{7} | 6
(Czech Republic) F Čermák (Czech Republic) L Friedl | 7 | 6
(Argentina) M García (Argentina) S Prieto | 5 | 4
WC | (Germany) A Beck (Germany) T Popp | 2 | 4
2 | (Romania) A Pavel (Germany) A Waske | 6 | 6

Semifinals
(Spain) G García-López (Spain) F Verdasco | 7^{7} | 6^{3} | [10]
(Argentina) J Acasuso (Argentina) J Mónaco | 6^{2} | 7^{7} | [3]
(Czech Republic) F Čermák (Czech Republic) L Friedl | 7^{7} | 6
2 | (Romania) A Pavel (Germany) A Waske | 6^{4} | 4

Final
(Spain) G García-López (Spain) F Verdasco | 4 | 4
(Czech Republic) F Čermák (Czech Republic) L Friedl | 6 | 6
