= 2023 BOSS Open – Singles =

Singles
- 2023 BOSS Open

Final
- Champion: (United States) Frances Tiafoe
- Runner-up: (Germany) Jan-Lennard Struff
- Score: 4–6, 7–6^{(7–1)}, 7–6^{(10–8)}

Details
- Draw: 28 (4 Q / 3 WC )
- Seeds: 8

Events
Singles	Doubles
← 2022 ·	Stuttgart Open	· 2024 →

Frances Tiafoe defeated Jan-Lennard Struff in the final, 4–6, 7–6^{(7–1)}, 7–6^{(10–8)} to win the singles title at the 2023 Stuttgart Open. It was his third ATP Tour title, and his first on grass courts (following titles on hardcourts and clay courts). Tiafoe saved a championship point en route to the title, in the final-set tiebreak. By winning the title, Tiafoe debuted in the top ten of the ATP rankings for the first time in his career.

Matteo Berrettini was the defending champion, but lost in the first round to Lorenzo Sonego.

== Seeds ==
The top four seeds received a bye into the second round.

1. (Greece) Stefanos Tsitsipas (second round)
2. (United States) Taylor Fritz (quarterfinals)
3. (United States) Frances Tiafoe (champion)
4. (Poland) Hubert Hurkacz (semifinals)
5. (United States) Tommy Paul (second round)
6. (Italy) Lorenzo Musetti (quarterfinals)
7. (Italy) Matteo Berrettini (first round)
8. (Australia) Nick Kyrgios (first round)

== Draw ==
=== Key ===
- Q = Qualifier
- WC = Wild card
- LL = Lucky loser
- Alt = Alternate
- ITF = ITF entry
- PR = Protected ranking
- SR = Special ranking
- SE = Special exempt
- JE = Junior exempt
- JR = Junior Accelerator Programme entrant
- CO = College Accelerator Programme entrant
- NG = Next Gen Accelerator Program entrant
- w/o = Walkover
- r = Retired
- d = Defaulted

=== Finals ===
Semifinals
(Germany) Jan-Lennard Struff	3	6	6
4	(Poland) Hubert Hurkacz	6	3	3
3	(United States) Frances Tiafoe	6	7^{13}
Q	(Hungary) Márton Fucsovics	3	6^{11}

Final
(Germany) Jan-Lennard Struff	6	6^{1}	6^{8}
3	(United States) Frances Tiafoe	4	7^{7}	7^{10}

=== Top half ===
First round
(France) R Gasquet	7^{7}	6
Q	(United States) C Eubanks	6^{2}	4
(China) Z Zhang	1	4
(Germany) J-L Struff	6	6
(France) B Bonzi	3	4
5	(United States) T Paul	6	6
WC	(Spain) F López	6^{5}	3
Q	(Japan) Y Watanuki	7^{7}	6
(Australia) C O'Connell	6	6
(Germany) D Altmaier	3	1
(Italy) L Sonego	6	6
7	(Italy) M Berrettini	1	2

Second round
1/WC	(Greece) S Tsitsipas	6^{8}	6	5
(France) R Gasquet	7^{10}	2	7
(Germany) J-L Struff	7^{7}	7^{7}
5	(United States) T Paul	6^{4}	6^{5}
4	(Poland) H Hurkacz	4	7^{7}	7^{7}
Q	(Japan) Y Watanuki	6	6^{5}	6^{5}
(Australia) C O'Connell	7^{7}	6
(Italy) L Sonego	6^{5}	3

Quarterfinals
(France) R Gasquet	4	5
(Germany) J-L Struff	6	7
4	(Poland) H Hurkacz	6	6
(Australia) C O'Connell	4	4

Semifinals
(Germany) J-L Struff	3	6	6
4	(Poland) H Hurkacz	6	3	3

=== Bottom half ===
First round
6	(Italy) L Musetti	7^{7}	6
Q	(Croatia) B Gojo	6^{4}	3
(France) G Barrère	6	6
WC	(Germany) O Otte	4	3
(United States) M Giron	6	3	4
(Czech Republic) J Lehečka	4	6	6
8	(Australia) N Kyrgios	5	3
(China) Y Wu	7	6
(Canada) D Shapovalov	6	3	4
Q	(Hungary) M Fucsovics	3	6	6
(France) C Moutet	6^{0}	7^{10}	5
A Karatsev	7^{7}	6^{8}	7

Second round
6	(Italy) L Musetti	6	6
(France) G Barrère	3	3
(Czech Republic) J Lehečka	6^{2}	4
3	(United States) F Tiafoe	7^{7}	6
(China) Y Wu	4	6	4
Q	(Hungary) M Fucsovics	6	4	6
A Karatsev	6^{4}	3
2	(United States) T Fritz	7^{7}	6

Quarterfinals
6	(Italy) L Musetti	7^{8}	6^{4}	2
3	(United States) F Tiafoe	6^{6}	7^{7}	6
Q	(Hungary) M Fucsovics	6	7
2	(United States) T Fritz	4	5

Semifinals
3	(United States) F Tiafoe	6	7^{13}
Q	(Hungary) M Fucsovics	3	6^{11}

== Qualifying ==
=== Seeds ===
1. (United States) Christopher Eubanks (qualified)
2. (Hungary) Márton Fucsovics (qualified)
3. Roman Safiullin (first round)
4. (Croatia) Borna Gojo (qualified)
5. (Moldova) Radu Albot (qualifying competition)
6. (Japan) Yosuke Watanuki (qualified)
7. (Switzerland) Antoine Bellier (qualifying competition)
8. (Turkey) Altuğ Çelikbilek (qualifying competition)

=== Qualifiers ===
1. (United States) Christopher Eubanks
2. (Hungary) Márton Fucsovics
3. (Japan) Yosuke Watanuki
4. (Croatia) Borna Gojo

=== Qualifying draw ===
==== First qualifier ====
First round
1	(United States) Christopher Eubanks	4	6	6
Alt	(Zimbabwe) Benjamin Lock	6	4	2
Alt	(France) Hugo Gaston	2	0
5	(Moldova) Radu Albot	6	6

Qualifying competition
1	(United States) Christopher Eubanks	7^{7}	7^{7}
5	(Moldova) Radu Albot	6^{5}	6^{3}

==== Second qualifier ====
First round
2	(Hungary) Márton Fucsovics	6	6
(Germany) Louis Wessels	3	1
Alt	(Germany) Max Hans Rehberg	1	4
8	(Turkey) Altuğ Çelikbilek	6	6

Qualifying competition
2	(Hungary) Márton Fucsovics	6	6
8	(Turkey) Altuğ Çelikbilek	4	4

==== Third qualifier ====
First round
3	Roman Safiullin	6^{5}	4
(Lebanon) Benjamin Hassan	7^{7}	6
(Germany) Henri Squire	6	5	3
6	(Japan) Yosuke Watanuki	4	7	6

Qualifying competition
(Lebanon) Benjamin Hassan	5	4
6	(Japan) Yosuke Watanuki	7	6

==== Fourth qualifier ====
First round
4	(Croatia) Borna Gojo	6^{4}	6	6
Alt	(Germany) Mats Rosenkranz	7^{7}	4	4
(Ukraine) Vladyslav Orlov	3	4
7	(Switzerland) Antoine Bellier	6	6

Qualifying competition
4	(Croatia) Borna Gojo	5	7^{7}	6
7	(Switzerland) Antoine Bellier	7	6^{2}	4
