= 2010 MercedesCup – Doubles =

Doubles
- 2010 MercedesCup

Final
- Champion: (Argentina) Carlos Berlocq (Argentina) Eduardo Schwank
- Runner-up: (Germany) Christopher Kas (Germany) Philipp Petzschner
- Score: 7–6^{(7–5)}, 7–6^{(7–6)}

Details
- Draw: 16
- Seeds: 4

Events
Singles	Doubles
- Stuttgart Open

František Čermák and Michal Mertiňák were the defending champions. Čermák chose not to compete, while Mertiňák chose to play with Johan Brunström.
Brunström and Mertiňák lost in the quarterfinals, against Carlos Berlocq and Eduardo Schwank.
This Argentinian pair won the tournament, after defeating Christopher Kas and Philipp Petzschner in the final 7–6^{(7–5)}, 7–6^{(7–6)}.

== Seeds ==
1. (Germany) Michael Kohlmann / (Austria) Jürgen Melzer (semifinals)
2. (Sweden) Johan Brunström / (Slovakia) Michal Mertiňák (quarterfinals)
3. (Germany) Christopher Kas / (Germany) Philipp Petzschner (final)
4. (Spain) Marc López / (Spain) David Marrero (quarterfinals)

== Draw ==
Key

- Q = Qualifier
- WC = Wild card
- LL = Lucky loser
- Alt = Alternate
- ITF = ITF entry
- PR = Protected ranking
- SR = Special ranking
- SE = Special exempt
- JE = Junior exempt
- JR = Junior Accelerator Programme entrant
- CO = College Accelerator Programme entrant
- NG = Next Gen Accelerator Program entrant
- w/o = Walkover
- r = Retired
- d = Defaulted

=== Draw ===
First round
1	(Germany) M Kohlmann (Austria) J Melzer	6	6
(Germany) F Mayer (Netherlands) R Wassen	2	3
WC	(Switzerland) S Ehrat (Switzerland) R Hemmeler	1	2
(United States) J Cerretani (Canada) A Shamasdin	6	6
3	(Germany) C Kas (Germany) P Petzschner	6	6
WC	(Jamaica) D Brown (Germany) M Zverev	4	3
(Spain) P Andújar (France) J Chardy	6	6
(Austria) P Oswald (Czech Republic) D Škoch	3	3
(Spain) G García-López (Spain) A Montañés	6^{5}	4
(Germany) P Marx (Slovakia) I Zelenay	7	6
(Germany) A Beck (Germany) M Berrer	6	1	[13]
4	(Spain) M López (Spain) D Marrero	3	6	[15]
(Argentina) C Berlocq (Argentina) E Schwank	7	6
(Spain) D Gimeno-Traver (Argentina) H Zeballos	5	3
(Switzerland) M Chiudinelli (Ukraine) S Stakhovsky	3	4
2	(Sweden) J Brunström (Slovakia) M Mertiňák	6	6

Quarterfinals
1	(Germany) M Kohlmann (Austria) J Melzer	7	3	[11]
(United States) J Cerretani (Canada) A Shamasdin	5	6	[9]
3	(Germany) C Kas (Germany) P Petzschner	6	6
(Spain) P Andújar (France) J Chardy	4	2
(Germany) P Marx (Slovakia) I Zelenay	6	7
4	(Spain) M López (Spain) D Marrero	3	5
(Argentina) C Berlocq (Argentina) E Schwank	6	7
2	(Sweden) J Brunström (Slovakia) M Mertiňák	4	6^{5}

Semifinals
1	(Germany) M Kohlmann (Austria) J Melzer	6^{6}	6	[7]
3	(Germany) C Kas (Germany) P Petzschner	7	3	[10]
(Germany) P Marx (Slovakia) I Zelenay	3	1
(Argentina) C Berlocq (Argentina) E Schwank	6	6

Finals
3	(Germany) C Kas (Germany) P Petzschner	6^{5}	6^{6}
(Argentina) C Berlocq (Argentina) E Schwank	7	7
