= 2022 BOSS Open – Doubles =

Doubles
- 2022 BOSS Open

Final
- Champions: (Poland) Hubert Hurkacz (Croatia) Mate Pavić
- Runners-up: (Germany) Tim Pütz (New Zealand) Michael Venus
- Score: 7–6^{(7–3)}, 7–6^{(7–5)}

Details
- Draw: 16
- Seeds: 4

Events
Singles	Doubles
- Stuttgart Open

Hubert Hurkacz and Mate Pavić defeated Tim Pütz and Michael Venus in the final, 7–6^{(7–3)}, 7–6^{(7–5)} to win the doubles tennis title at the 2022 Stuttgart Open.

Marcelo Demoliner and Santiago González were the defending champions, but chose not to defend their title.

== Seeds ==
1. (Germany) Tim Pütz / (New Zealand) Michael Venus (final)
2. (Australia) John Peers / (Slovakia) Filip Polášek (first round)
3. (Poland) Hubert Hurkacz / (Croatia) Mate Pavić (champions)
4. (France) Fabrice Martin / (Germany) Andreas Mies (semifinals)

== Draw ==
Key

- Q = Qualifier
- WC = Wild card
- LL = Lucky loser
- Alt = Alternate
- ITF = ITF entry
- PR = Protected ranking
- SR = Special ranking
- SE = Special exempt
- JE = Junior exempt
- JR = Junior Accelerator Programme entrant
- CO = College Accelerator Programme entrant
- NG = Next Gen Accelerator Program entrant
- w/o = Walkover
- r = Retired
- d = Defaulted

=== Draw ===
First round
1	(Germany) T Pütz (New Zealand) M Venus	6	7^{7}
(Bosnia and Herzegovina) T Brkić (Portugal) F Cabral	2	6^{5}
(Uruguay) A Behar (Ecuador) G Escobar	6^{6}	7^{10}	[8]
(France) B Bonzi (France) A Rinderknech	7^{8}	6^{8}	[10]
4	(France) F Martin (Germany) A Mies	6	6
(Germany) D Altmaier (Germany) O Otte	3	4
(Kazakhstan) A Bublik (Australia) N Kyrgios	6	6
(Mexico) H Hach Verdugo (Austria) P Oswald	2	4
(Sweden) A Göransson (Japan) B McLachlan	6^{3}	7^{7}	[8]
WC	(Greece) Pe Tsitsipas (Greece) S Tsitsipas	7^{7}	6^{4}	[10]
WC	(Jamaica) D Brown (United States) E King	3	4
3	(Poland) H Hurkacz (Croatia) M Pavić	6	6
(India) R Bopanna (Canada) D Shapovalov	6	6
(Israel) J Erlich; A Karatsev	4	0
(Kazakhstan) A Nedovyesov (Pakistan) A-u-H Qureshi	7^{7}	6
2	(Australia) J Peers (Slovakia) F Polášek	6^{2}	4

Quarterfinals
1	(Germany) T Pütz (New Zealand) M Venus	7^{8}	3	[10]
(France) B Bonzi (France) A Rinderknech	6^{6}	6	[7]
4	(France) F Martin (Germany) A Mies	7^{7}	7^{7}
(Kazakhstan) A Bublik (Australia) N Kyrgios	6^{5}	6^{4}
WC	(Greece) Pe Tsitsipas (Greece) S Tsitsipas	6	6^{3}	[5]
3	(Poland) H Hurkacz (Croatia) M Pavić	4	7^{7}	[10]
(India) R Bopanna (Canada) D Shapovalov	6	3	[11]
(Kazakhstan) A Nedovyesov (Pakistan) A-u-H Qureshi	4	6	[9]

Semifinals
1	(Germany) T Pütz (New Zealand) M Venus	6	7^{11}
4	(France) F Martin (Germany) A Mies	3	6^{9}
3	(Poland) H Hurkacz (Croatia) M Pavić	7^{7}	7^{7}
(India) R Bopanna (Canada) D Shapovalov	6^{1}	6^{5}

Final
1	(Germany) T Pütz (New Zealand) M Venus	6^{3}	6^{5}
3	(Poland) H Hurkacz (Croatia) M Pavić	7^{7}	7^{7}
