= Stuttgart Open =

ATP Tour 250 series tennis tournament on the ATP Tour

Coordinates: 48.796°N 9.169°E

ATP Tour
- Event name: Mercedes Cup (1978–2021); BOSS Open (2022–)
- Tour: ATP Tour
- Founded: 1916; 110 years ago
- Location: Stuttgart, Germany
- Venue: Tennis Club Weissenhof
- Category: ATP Tour 250 / ATP International Series (2002, 2009-current); ATP Tour 500 / ATP International Series Gold (1990-2001, 2003-2008); Grand Prix tennis circuit (1978-1989)
- Surface: Grass / outdoor (2015–current); Clay / outdoor (1916–2014)
- Draw: 28S/16Q/16D
- Prize money: €734,915 (2024)
- Website: bossopen.com

Current champions (2026)
- Singles: (United States) Ben Shelton
- Doubles: (Germany) Yannick Hanfmann (Germany) Jan-Lennard Struff

The Stuttgart Open known as the BOSS Open (sponsored by Hugo Boss since 2022), is an ATP 250 professional tennis tournament on the ATP Tour played on grass courts. It was played on clay until 2014. Along with the move to grass, the tournament is now staged in the week following the French Open.

== History ==
Held since 1916 in Stuttgart, Germany, prior to the beginning of World War II the tournament was known as the Championships of Stuttgart. Following the Second World War it was branded as the Stuttgart International Championships or the Stuttgart Weissenhof International.

From 1970 to 1989, the Stuttgart Open was a Grand Prix tennis circuit event. From 1990 to 1999, the Stuttgart Open was an ATP Championship Series tournament. The Championship Series name was changed to ATP International Series Gold in 2000, and the Stuttgart Open was a part of this series from 2000–2001 and 2003–2008. In 2002, the Stuttgart Open was briefly demoted for one year to ATP International Series status. The series were renamed to ATP Tour 250 in 2009, and the event has retained the classification ever since.

The Stuttgart Open has always been played outdoors, while the Eurocard Open was a tournament that was played indoors in Stuttgart from 1988–2001, with the exception of 1995 when it was played in Essen. The Eurocard Open was also the eighth Super 9 event on the ATP Tour from 1995–2001.

Until 2021 under the sponsorship of Mercedes-Benz, the tournament champions were awarded a Mercedes car, in addition to the prize money.

== Past finals ==
=== Singles ===
Year	Champions	Runners-up	Score
Information unavailable 1916–1936
1937	(West Germany) Edgar Dettmar	(West Germany) Edmund Bartkowiak	6–3, 4–6, 6–4, 6–2
1949	(West Germany) Werner Breuthner	(West Germany) Otto Fürst	6–3, 6–3, 4–6, 6–2
1950	(West Germany) Helmut Gulcz	(Czech Republic) Jan Dostal	2–6, 6–3, 6–3, 6–1
1951	(West Germany) Otto Fürst	(West Germany) Peter De Vos	6–3, 6–3
1952	(Socialist Federal Republic of Yugoslavia) Milan Branović	(France) Jacques Thomas	4–6, 10–8, 7–5, ret.
1953	(Denmark) Torben Ulrich	(Sweden) Bengt Axelsson	2–6, 6–3, 6–2, 6–0
1954	(West Germany) Gottfried von Cramm	(Canada) Robert Bédard	6–4, 6–8, 6–2
1955	(United States) Hugh Stewart	(United States) Tony Vincent	6–2, 8–6, 6–4
1956	(Australia) Jack Arkinstall	(United States) Tony Vincent	6–2, 8–6, 6–4
1957	(Austria) Ladislav Legenstein	(Socialist Federal Republic of Yugoslavia) Milan Branović	
1958	(Sweden) Ulf Schmidt	(Belgium) Jacques Brichant	6–4, 6–4, 7–9, 6–1
1959	(Australia) Warren Woodcock	(Denmark) Torben Ulrich	6–3, 6–2, 6–3
1960	(Sweden) Ulf Schmidt (2)	(Australia) Warren Woodcock	6–2, 2–6, 6–4, 1–6, 6–3
1961	(Australia) Warren Woodcock (2)	(Australia) Barry Phillips-Moore	2–6, 5–7, 6–4, 6–2, 7–5
1962	(Sweden) Ulf Schmidt (3)	(Sweden) Jan-Erik Lundqvist	6–4, 7–5
1963	(South Africa) Gordon Forbes	(Australia) Warren Woodcock	6–1, 8–6, 6–3
1964	(South Africa) Cliff Drysdale	(South Africa) Keith Diepraam	6–1, 6–3
1965	(South Africa) Cliff Drysdale (2)	(West Germany) Wilhelm Bungert	6–0, 6–1, 6–1
1966	(South Africa) Frew McMillan	(South Africa) Keith Diepraam	6–4, 7–5
1967	(Australia) Roy Emerson	(Romania) Ion Țiriac	1–6, 6–3, 6–4, 6–2
↓ Open Era ↓
1968	(India) Ramanathan Krishnan	(West Germany) Detlev Nitsche	6–2, 6–8, 6–4, retired
1969	(West Germany) Christian Kuhnke	(West Germany) Wilhelm Bungert	2–6, 6–2, 6–0, 6–2
1970	Not held		
1971	(Australia) Barry Phillips-Moore	(Hungary) István Gulyás	6–4, 6–3, 6–4
1972	(West Germany) Attila Korpás	(Socialist Federal Republic of Yugoslavia) Zlatko Ivančić	6–8, 6–2, 6–3, 6–4
1973	(West Germany) Harald Elschenbroich	(West Germany) Hans-Jürgen Pohmann	2–6, 6–0, 6–2, 6–4
1974	(West Germany) Hans-Joachim Plötz	(France) Jacques Thamin	6–1, 2–6, 6–4, 6–4
1975		(West Germany) Jürgen Fassbender (Australia) Richard Crealy	Final interrupted
1976	(West Germany) Attila Korpás (2)	(Socialist Federal Republic of Yugoslavia) Zlatko Ivančić	6–4, 6-4, 4–6, 2–6, 6–4
1977	(West Germany) Jürgen Fassbender	(West Germany) Attila Korpás	walkover
↓ Grand Prix circuit ↓
1978	(West Germany) Ulrich Pinner	(Australia) Kim Warwick	6–4, 6–2, 7–6
1979	(Czechoslovakia) Tomáš Šmíd	(West Germany) Ulrich Pinner	6–4, 6–0, 6–2
1980	(United States) Vitas Gerulaitis	(Poland) Wojtek Fibak	6–2, 7–5, 6–2
1981	(Sweden) Björn Borg	(Czechoslovakia) Ivan Lendl	1–6, 7–6, 6–2, 6–4
1982	(India) Ramesh Krishnan	(United States) Sandy Mayer	5–7, 6–3, 6–3, 7–6
1983	(Spain) José Higueras	(Switzerland) Heinz Günthardt	6–1, 6–1, 7–6
1984	(France) Henri Leconte	(United States) Gene Mayer	7–6^{(11–9)}, 6–0, 1–6, 6–1
1985	(Czechoslovakia) Ivan Lendl	(United States) Brad Gilbert	6–4, 6–0
1986	(Argentina) Martín Jaite	(Sweden) Jonas Svensson	7–5, 6–2
1987	(Czechoslovakia) Miloslav Mečíř	(Sweden) Jan Gunnarsson	6–0, 6–2
1988	(United States) Andre Agassi	(Ecuador) Andrés Gómez	6–4, 6–2
1989	(Argentina) Martín Jaite	(Socialist Federal Republic of Yugoslavia) Goran Prpić	6–3, 6–2
↓ ATP Tour 500 (Note: Known as Championship Series from 1990 till 1999 and International Series Gold from 2000 till 2008.) ↓
1990	(Socialist Federal Republic of Yugoslavia) Goran Ivanišević	(Argentina) Guillermo Pérez Roldán	6–7^{(2–7)}, 6–1, 6–4, 7–6^{(7–5)}
1991	(Germany) Michael Stich	(Argentina) Alberto Mancini	1–6, 7–6^{(11–9)}, 6–4, 6–2
1992	(Ukraine) Andrei Medvedev	(South Africa) Wayne Ferreira	6–1, 6–4, 6–7^{(5–7)}, 2–6, 6–1
1993	(Sweden) Magnus Gustafsson	(Germany) Michael Stich	6–3, 6–4, 3–6, 4–6, 6–4
1994	(Spain) Alberto Berasategui	(Italy) Andrea Gaudenzi	7–5, 6–3, 7–6^{(7–5)}
1995	(Austria) Thomas Muster	(Sweden) Jan Apell	6–2, 6–2
1996	(Austria) Thomas Muster (2)	(Russia) Yevgeny Kafelnikov	6–2, 6–2, 6–4
1997	(Spain) Álex Corretja	(Slovakia) Karol Kučera	6–2, 7–5
1998	(Brazil) Gustavo Kuerten	(Slovakia) Karol Kučera	4–6, 6–2, 6–4
1999	(Sweden) Magnus Norman	(Germany) Tommy Haas	6–7^{(6–8)}, 4–6, 7–6^{(9–7)}, 6–0, 6–3
2000	(Argentina) Franco Squillari	(Argentina) Gastón Gaudio	6–2, 3–6, 4–6, 6–4, 6–2
2001	(Brazil) Gustavo Kuerten (2)	(Argentina) Guillermo Cañas	6–3, 6–2, 6–4
↓ ATP Tour 250 (Note: Known as World Series from 1990 till 1999 and International Series from 2000 till 2008.) ↓
2002	(Russia) Mikhail Youzhny	(Argentina) Guillermo Cañas	6–3, 3–6, 3–6, 6–4, 6–4
↓ ATP Tour 500 ↓
2003	(Argentina) Guillermo Coria	(Spain) Tommy Robredo	6–2, 6–2, 6–1
2004	(Argentina) Guillermo Cañas	(Argentina) Gastón Gaudio	5–7, 6–2, 6–0, 1–6, 6–3
2005	(Spain) Rafael Nadal	(Argentina) Gastón Gaudio	6–3, 6–3, 6–4
2006	(Spain) David Ferrer	(Argentina) José Acasuso	6–4, 3–6, 6–7^{(3–7)}, 7–5, 6–4
2007	(Spain) Rafael Nadal (2)	(Switzerland) Stan Wawrinka	6–4, 7–5
2008	(Argentina) Juan Martín del Potro	(France) Richard Gasquet	6–4, 7–5
↓ ATP Tour 250 ↓
2009	(France) Jérémy Chardy	(Romania) Victor Hănescu	1–6, 6–3, 6–4
2010	(Spain) Albert Montañés	(France) Gaël Monfils	6–2, 1–2, RET.
2011	(Spain) Juan Carlos Ferrero	(Spain) Pablo Andújar	6–4, 6–0
2012	(Serbia) Janko Tipsarević	(Argentina) Juan Mónaco	6–4, 5–7, 6–3
2013	(Italy) Fabio Fognini	(Germany) Philipp Kohlschreiber	5–7, 6–4, 6–4
2014	(Spain) Roberto Bautista Agut	(Czech Republic) Lukáš Rosol	6–3, 4–6, 6–2
2015 (Note: Tournament surface changed from clay to grass court.)	(Spain) Rafael Nadal (3)	(Serbia) Viktor Troicki	7–6^{(7–3)}, 6–3
2016	(Austria) Dominic Thiem	(Germany) Philipp Kohlschreiber	6–7^{(2–7)}, 6–4, 6–4
2017	(France) Lucas Pouille	(Spain) Feliciano López	4–6, 7–6^{(7–5)}, 6–4
2018	(Switzerland) Roger Federer	(Canada) Milos Raonic	6–4, 7–6^{(7–3)}
2019	(Italy) Matteo Berrettini	(Canada) Félix Auger-Aliassime	6–4, 7–6^{(13–11)}
2020	Not held due to COVID-19 pandemic		
2021	(Croatia) Marin Čilić	(Canada) Félix Auger-Aliassime	7–6^{(7–2)}, 6–3
2022	(Italy) Matteo Berrettini (2)	(United Kingdom) Andy Murray	6–4, 5–7, 6–3
2023	(United States) Frances Tiafoe	(Germany) Jan-Lennard Struff	4–6, 7–6^{(7–1)}, 7–6^{(10–8)}
2024	(United Kingdom) Jack Draper	(Italy) Matteo Berrettini	3–6, 7–6^{(7–5)}, 6–4
2025	(United States) Taylor Fritz	(Germany) Alexander Zverev	6–3, 7–6^{(7–0)}
2026	(United States) Ben Shelton	(United States) Taylor Fritz	6–4, 2–6, 6–4

=== Doubles ===
Year	Champions	Runners-up	Score
↓ Grand Prix circuit ↓
1978	(Czech Republic) Jan Kodeš (Czech Republic) Tomáš Šmíd	(Brazil) Carlos Kirmayr (Chile) Belus Prajoux	6–3, 7–6
1979	(Zimbabwe) Colin Dowdeswell (South Africa) Frew McMillan	(Poland) Wojtek Fibak (Czech Republic) Pavel Složil	6–4, 6–2, 2–6, 6–4
1980	(Zimbabwe) Colin Dowdeswell (South Africa) Frew McMillan	(New Zealand) Chris Lewis (South Africa) John Yuill	6–3, 6–4
1981	(Australia) Peter McNamara (Australia) Paul McNamee	(Australia) Mark Edmondson (United States) Mike Estep	2–6, 6–4, 7–6
1982	(Australia) Mark Edmondson (United States) Brian Teacher	(Germany) Andreas Maurer (Germany) Wolfgang Popp	6–3, 6–1
1983	(India) Anand Amritraj (United States) Mike Bauer	(Czech Republic) Pavel Složil (Czech Republic) Tomáš Šmíd	4–6, 6–3, 6–2
1984	(United States) Sandy Mayer (Germany) Andreas Maurer	(United States) Fritz Buehning (United States) Ferdi Taygan	7–6, 6–4
1985	(Czech Republic) Ivan Lendl (Czech Republic) Tomáš Šmíd	(United States) Andy Kohlberg (Brazil) João Soares	3–6, 6–4, 6–2
1986	(Chile) Hans Gildemeister (Ecuador) Andrés Gómez	(Iran) Mansour Bahrami (Uruguay) Diego Pérez	6–4, 6–3
1987	(United States) Rick Leach (United States) Tim Pawsat	(Sweden) Mikael Pernfors (Sweden) Magnus Tideman	6–3, 6–4
1988	(Spain) Sergio Casal (Spain) Emilio Sánchez	(Sweden) Anders Järryd (Denmark) Michael Mortensen	4–6, 6–3, 6–4
1989	(Czech Republic) Petr Korda (Czech Republic) Tomáš Šmíd	(Romania) Florin Segărceanu (Czech Republic) Cyril Suk	6–3, 6–4
↓ ATP Tour 500 ↓
1990	(South Africa) Pieter Aldrich (South Africa) Danie Visser	(Sweden) Per Henricsson (Sweden) Nicklas Utgren	6–3, 6–4
1991	(Australia) Wally Masur (Spain) Emilio Sánchez	(Italy) Omar Camporese (Croatia) Goran Ivanišević	4–6, 6–3, 6–4
1992	(United States) Glenn Layendecker (South Africa) Byron Talbot	(Switzerland) Marc Rosset (Spain) Javier Sánchez	4–6, 6–3, 6–4
1993	(Netherlands) Tom Nijssen (Czech Republic) Cyril Suk	(South Africa) Gary Muller (South Africa) Piet Norval	7–6, 6–3
1994	(United States) Scott Melville (South Africa) Piet Norval	(Netherlands) Jacco Eltingh (Netherlands) Paul Haarhuis	7–6, 7–5
1995	(Spain) Tomás Carbonell (Spain) Francisco Roig	(South Africa) Ellis Ferreira (Netherlands) Jan Siemerink	3–6, 6–3, 6–4
1996	(Belgium) Libor Pimek (South Africa) Byron Talbot	(Spain) Tomás Carbonell (Spain) Francisco Roig	6–2, 5–7, 6–4
1997	(Brazil) Gustavo Kuerten (Brazil) Fernando Meligeni	(United States) Donald Johnson (United States) Francisco Montana	6–4, 6–4
1998	(France) Olivier Delaître (France) Fabrice Santoro	(Australia) Joshua Eagle (United States) Jim Grabb	6–1, 3–6, 6–3
1999	(Brazil) Jaime Oncins (Argentina) Daniel Orsanic	(North Macedonia) Aleksandar Kitinov (United States) Jack Waite	6–2, 6–1
2000	(Czech Republic) Jiří Novák (Czech Republic) David Rikl	(Argentina) Lucas Arnold Ker (United States) Donald Johnson	5–7, 6–2, 6–3
2001	(Argentina) Guillermo Cañas (Germany) Rainer Schüttler	(Australia) Michael Hill (United States) Jeff Tarango	4–6, 7–6, 6–4
↓ ATP Tour 250 ↓
2002	(Australia) Joshua Eagle (Czech Republic) David Rikl	(South Africa) David Adams (Argentina) Gastón Etlis	6–3, 6–4
↓ ATP Tour 500 ↓
2003	(Czech Republic) Tomáš Cibulec (Czech Republic) Pavel Vízner	(Russia) Yevgeny Kafelnikov (Zimbabwe) Kevin Ullyett	3–6, 6–3, 6–4
2004	(Czech Republic) Jiří Novák (Czech Republic) Radek Štěpánek	(Sweden) Simon Aspelin (Australia) Todd Perry	6–2, 6–4
2005	(Argentina) José Acasuso (Argentina) Sebastián Prieto	(Argentina) Mariano Hood (Spain) Tommy Robredo	7–6, 6–3
2006	(Argentina) Gastón Gaudio (Belarus) Max Mirnyi	(Switzerland) Yves Allegro (Sweden) Robert Lindstedt	7–5, 6–7, [12–10]
2007	(Czech Republic) František Čermák (Czech Republic) Leoš Friedl	(Spain) Guillermo García-López (Spain) Fernando Verdasco	6–4, 6–4
2008	(Germany) Christopher Kas (Germany) Philipp Kohlschreiber	(Germany) Michael Berrer (Germany) Mischa Zverev	6–3, 6–4
↓ ATP Tour 250 ↓
2009	(Czech Republic) František Čermák (Slovakia) Michal Mertiňák	(Romania) Victor Hănescu (Romania) Horia Tecău	7–5, 6–4
2010	(Argentina) Carlos Berlocq (Argentina) Eduardo Schwank	(Germany) Christopher Kas (Germany) Philipp Petzschner	7–6^{(7–5)}, 7–6^{(8–6)}
2011	(Austria) Jürgen Melzer (Germany) Philipp Petzschner	(Spain) Marcel Granollers (Spain) Marc López	6–3, 6–4
2012	(France) Jérémy Chardy (Poland) Łukasz Kubot	(Slovakia) Michal Mertiňák (Brazil) André Sá	6–1, 6–3
2013	(Argentina) Facundo Bagnis (Brazil) Thomaz Bellucci	(Poland) Tomasz Bednarek (Poland) Mateusz Kowalczyk	2–6, 6–4, [11–9]
2014	(Poland) Mateusz Kowalczyk (New Zealand) Artem Sitak	(Spain) Guillermo García-López (Austria) Philipp Oswald	2–6, 6–1, [10–7]
2015	(India) Rohan Bopanna (Romania) Florin Mergea	(Austria) Alexander Peya (Brazil) Bruno Soares	5–7, 6–2, [10–7]
2016	(New Zealand) Marcus Daniell (New Zealand) Artem Sitak	(Austria) Oliver Marach (France) Fabrice Martin	6–7^{(4–7)}, 6–4, [10–8]
2017	(United Kingdom) Jamie Murray (Brazil) Bruno Soares	(Austria) Oliver Marach (Croatia) Mate Pavić	6–7^{(4–7)}, 7–5, [10–5]
2018	(Germany) Philipp Petzschner (Germany) Tim Pütz	(Sweden) Robert Lindstedt (Poland) Marcin Matkowski	7–6^{(7–5)}, 6–3
2019	(Australia) John Peers (Brazil) Bruno Soares	(India) Rohan Bopanna (Canada) Denis Shapovalov	7–5, 6–3
2020	Not held due to COVID-19 pandemic		
2021	(Brazil) Marcelo Demoliner (Mexico) Santiago González	(Uruguay) Ariel Behar (Ecuador) Gonzalo Escobar	4–6, 6–3, [10–8]
2022	(Poland) Hubert Hurkacz (Croatia) Mate Pavić	(Germany) Tim Pütz (New Zealand) Michael Venus	7–6^{(7–3)}, 7–6^{(7–5)}
2023	(Croatia) Nikola Mektić (Croatia) Mate Pavić	(Germany) Kevin Krawietz (Germany) Tim Pütz	7–6^{(7–2)}, 6–3
2024	(Brazil) Rafael Matos (Brazil) Marcelo Melo	(United Kingdom) Julian Cash (United States) Robert Galloway	3–6, 6–3, [10–8]
2025	(Mexico) Santiago González (United States) Austin Krajicek	(United States) Alex Michelsen (United States) Rajeev Ram	6–4, 6–4
2026	(Germany) Yannick Hanfmann (Germany) Jan-Lennard Struff	(Estonia) Daniil Glinka (Greece) Stefanos Sakellaridis	7–6^{(7–2)}, 3–6, [11–9]

== See also ==
- List of tennis tournaments
