= Tennis Club Weissenhof =

Tennis complex in Stuttgart, Germany

Coordinates: 48.796274°N 9.169604°E

- Interactive map of Tennis Club Weissenhof
- Location: Stuttgart, Germany
- Capacity: 6,500

Tenant
- MercedesCup (Tennis) (1978-present)

The Tennis Club Weissenhof is a tennis complex in Stuttgart, Germany. The complex's tenant is MercedesCup.

== See also ==
- List of tennis stadiums by capacity
