= 2008 Tennis Masters Cup =

- Date: 9–16 November
- Edition: 39th (singles) / 34th (doubles)
- Category: Masters
- Draw: 8S / 8D
- Surface: Hard / indoor
- Location: Shanghai, China
- Venue: Qizhong Forest Sports City Arena

Champions

Singles
- (Serbia) Novak Djokovic

Doubles
- (Canada) Daniel Nestor / (Serbia) Nenad Zimonjić
- ATP Finals

The 2008 Tennis Masters Cup was a men's tennis tournament played on indoor hard courts. It was the 39th edition of the year-end singles championships, the 34th edition of the year-end doubles championships, and part of the 2008 ATP Tour. It took place at the Qizhong Forest Sports City Arena in Shanghai, China, from November 9 through November 16, 2008.

Association of Tennis Professionals (ATP) No. 3 Novak Djokovic of Serbia won his first year-end championships title in the singles event, defeating ATP No. 5 Nikolay Davydenko of Russia in the final 6–1, 7–5. Four-time winner, two-time defending champion Roger Federer was defeated in the round-robin stage of the event for the first time in seven consecutive appearances. Daniel Nestor of Canada and Nenad Zimonjić of Serbia won the doubles event 7–6, 6–2 over Americans Bob and Mike Bryan in the final for their first year-end championships doubles title together. With the win, they clinched the year-end No. 1 spot for the first time together. Nestor successfully defended his 2007 Tennis Masters Cup title with his new partner Zimonjić, while the other defending champion, Mark Knowles, lost in the round robin, with Mahesh Bhupathi.

It was the last time that the singles and doubles year-end championships took place in Shanghai as the Tennis Masters Cup. Starting in 2009, the season-ending event went to London, United Kingdom, at the O_{2} arena, under the new name of ATP World Tour Finals. Shanghai instead received a newly created event in the 2009 season, the Shanghai Masters, which take places earlier in the ATP calendar.

== Finals ==
=== Singles ===
(Serbia) Novak Djokovic defeated (Russia) Nikolay Davydenko 6–1, 7–5

=== Doubles ===
(Canada) Daniel Nestor / (Serbia) Nenad Zimonjić defeated (United States) Bob Bryan / (United States) Mike Bryan 7–6^{(7–3)}, 6–2

== Points and prize money ==
| Stage | Singles | Doubles^{1} | Points |
|---|---|---|---|
| Champion | RR + $940,000 | RR +$100,000 | RR + 900 |
| Runner-up | RR + $315,000 | RR +$25,000 | RR + 400 |
| Round-robin win per match | $100,000 | $15,000 | 200 |
| Participation fee | $100,000^{2} | $50,000^{3} | – |

- RR is points or prize money won in the round-robin stage.
- ^{1} Prize money for doubles is per team.
- ^{2} Pro-rated on a per-match basis: $50,000 = 1 match, $75,000 = 2 matches, $100,000 = 3 matches
- ^{3} 3 Pro-rated on a per-match basis: $20,000 = 1 match, $35,000 = 2 matches, $50,000 = 3 matches
- An undefeated singles champion would earn the maximum 1,500 points and $1,340,000 in prize money ($100,000 participation, $300,000 undefeated round robin, $315,000 semifinal win, $625,000 final win)
- An undefeated doubles champion would earn the maximum 1,500 points and $220,000 in prize money ($50,000 participation, $45,000 undefeated round robin, $25,000 semifinal win, $100,000 final win). While each of them would get 1,500 points, the $220,000 would be split, so $110,000 for each member of the team.

== Qualification ==
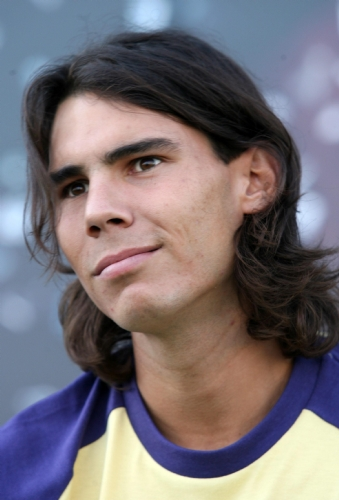
Rafael Nadal was the first Spaniard to become year-end No. 1

Spots were awarded to the top seven players and the top seven doubles teams in the 2008 ATP Race, with one spot reserved for Grand Slam champions who finished within the Top 20 players or teams of the ATP Race rankings. Two more players and teams also went to Shanghai as alternates in case of withdrawals.

=== Singles ===
On July 9 – after the 2008 Wimbledon Championships – the first three players to qualify for the 2008 year-end championships were selected: ATP No. 2 Rafael Nadal of Spain, World No. 1 Roger Federer of Switzerland and third-ranked Novak Djokovic of Serbia. These players, who held the top three spots of the ATP rankings during the whole year, secured their fourth, seventh and second appearance respectively in the season's finale.

Rafael Nadal, who reached his first hard courts Grand Slam semifinal at the Australian Open (lost to Tsonga), qualified after winning the French Open for a fourth consecutive time, matching Björn Borg's record performance from 1978 to 1981. He broke Roger Federer's streak of five consecutive titles in Wimbledon as he defeated the Swiss 6–4, 6–4, 6–7, 6–7, 9–7, in a four-hour-forty-eight-minute-long final – the second longest championship match in Wimbledon's history – to become the first tennis player to complete the Roland-Garros/Wimbledon double since Borg. In addition to the two Grand Slam titles, Nadal had also, at the time of his qualification, reached two finals in Chennai (lost to Youhzny) and Miami (lost to Davydenko), won his fourth consecutive title in Monte Carlo (def. Federer) and at Barcelona (def. Ferrer), and his first in Hamburg (def. Federer) and at London's Queen's Club (def. Djokovic), where he became, two weeks before his Wimbledon victory, the first Spaniard to win a grass court title since Andrés Gimeno in 1972. After his qualification, Nadal clinched a second title at the Canada Masters (def. Kiefer), a gold medal at the 2008 Beijing Summer Olympics (def. González), and a semifinal run at the US Open (lost to Murray). On August 18, after 160 weeks at ATP No. 2, Rafael Nadal overtook Roger Federer, breaking his 237-week streak at the top spot, to become the 24th player to hold the No. 1 rank in the twenty-five years of computerised-rankings history. Nadal eventually withdrew in the run-up to the tournament, citing fatigue.

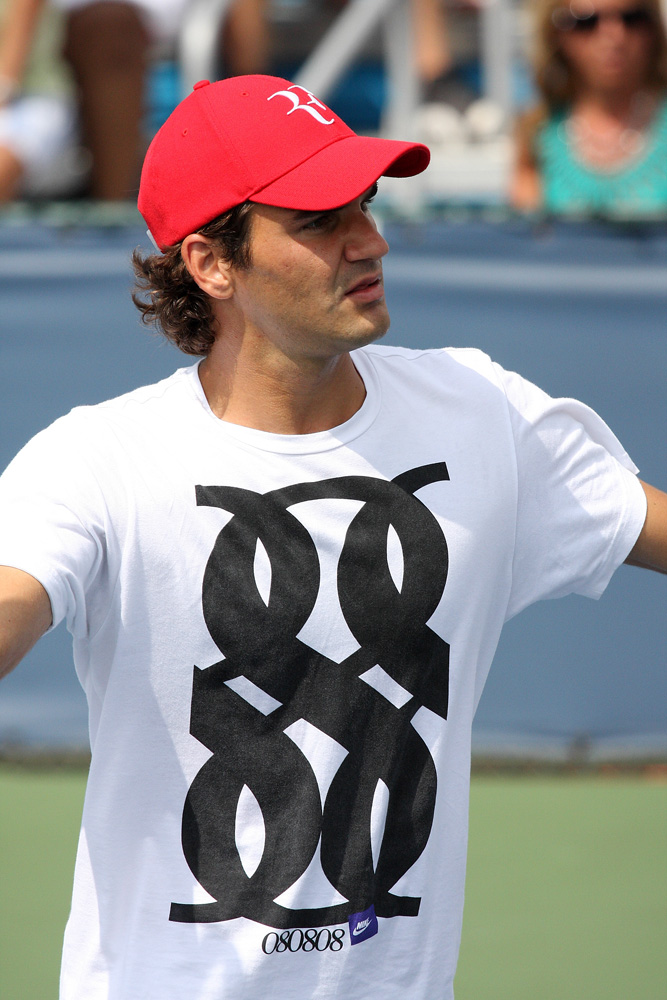
Roger Federer finished in the Top Ten for the seventh straight year

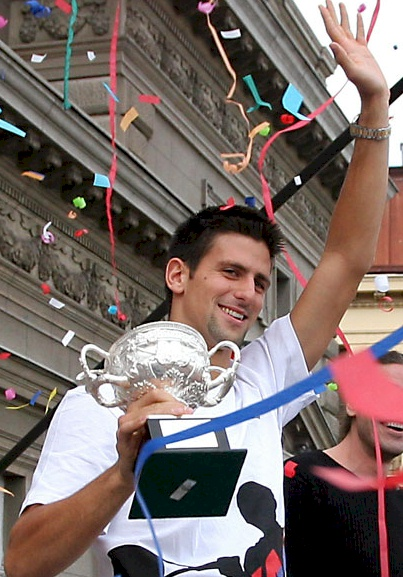
Novak Djokovic remained ranked third during the complete season

Roger Federer started his 2008 campaign with his first exit before the final in a major event since a 2005 defeat by Rafael Nadal at the French Open, when he lost in the Australian Open semifinals to Djokovic. After announcing he had contracted mononucleosis in December 2007, Federer hired clay-court specialist José Higueras to coach him, first during the clay court season, but eventually for the rest of the year. Federer qualified after he reached his third consecutive French Open final (lost to Nadal), where he suffered a 6–1, 6–3, 6–0 defeat, and his sixth consecutive Wimbledon final (lost to Nadal). After failing to beat the five-consecutive-title streak at the All England Club record and losing his third Grand Slam tournament in a row for the first time since 2002, Federer described the Wimbledon final as his "hardest loss by far". When he qualified, Federer had lost two more finals to Nadal in Monte Carlo and Hamburg, and won only two ATP International Series titles in Estoril (def. Davydenko) and Halle (def. Kohlschreiber). Despite losing his number 1 spot to Nadal in August, the rest of Federer's season featured better results with a third consecutive title in Basel (def. Nalbandian), and a fifth straight victory at the US Open (def. Murray) which brought him one Grand Slam title short of Pete Sampras's record of fourteen.

Novak Djokovic had the best start of the season, as the Serb reached his second straight Grand Slam final after the 2007 US Open, and won his first major title at the Australian Open (def. Tsonga), becoming the first man other that Federer or Nadal to win a Grand Slam since Marat Safin in Melbourne three years before. Djokovic reached his fifth straight Grand Slam semifinal at the French Open (lost to Nadal), but suffered his earliest exit in a major since a first round loss at the 2006 Australian Open, in the second round of the Wimbledon Championships (lost to Safin). In the first part of the year, Djokovic also reached the London's Queen's Club final (lost to Nadal), and won two ATP Masters Series titles in Indian Wells (def. Fish) and Rome (def. Wawrinka). After qualifying for the year-end event, Djokovic lost to Nadal in the semifinals of the Beijing Olympics tennis event, but defeated James Blake in the third place match to win a Bronze Medal for Serbia. Despite this run, Djokovic failed to win another title in 2008 until the Tennis Masters Cup. He could not defend his 2007 final appearance at the US Open (lost to Federer), reaching only two tournaments finals in Cincinnati (lost to Murray) and Bangkok (lost to Tsonga).

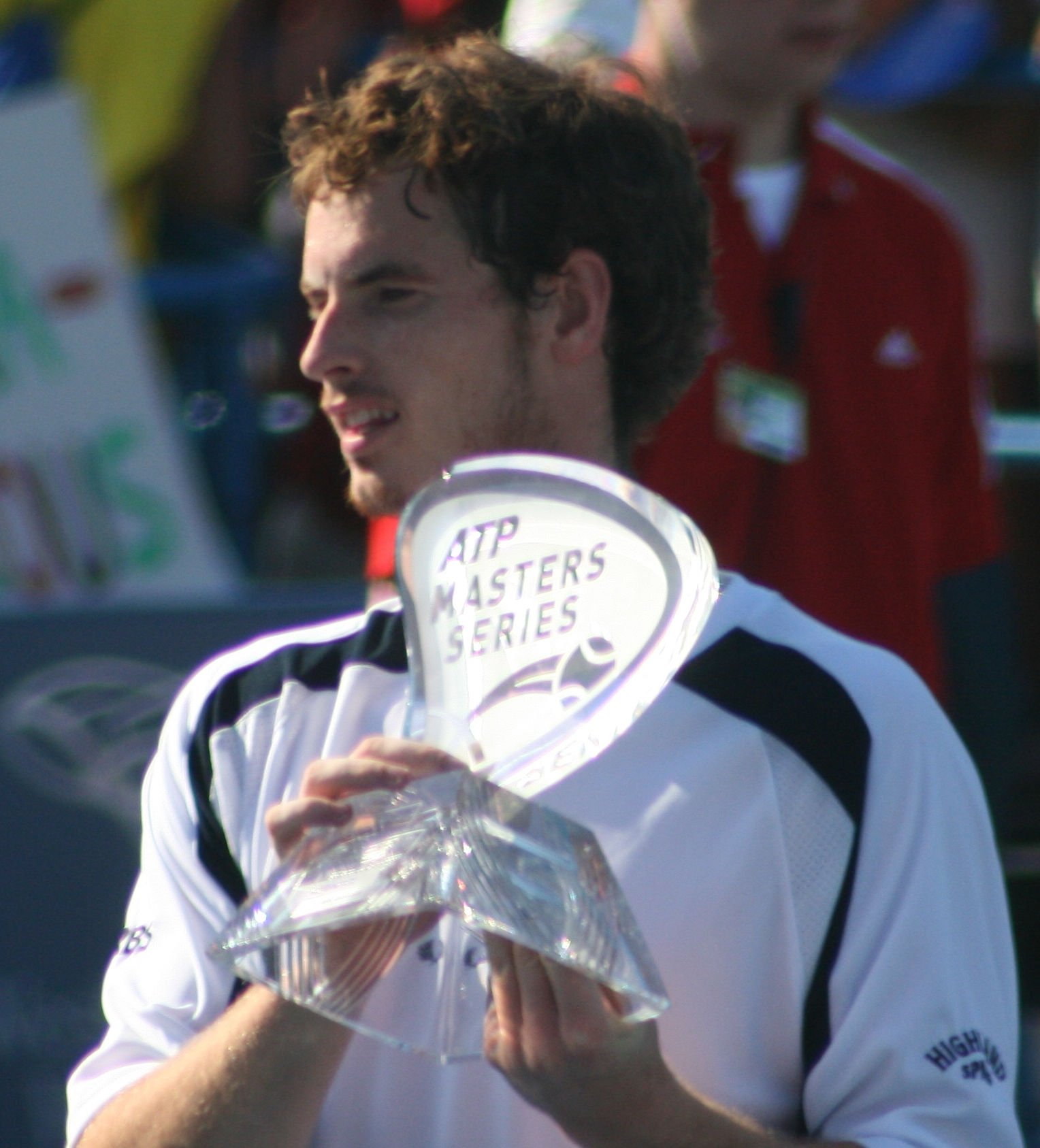
Andy Murray won his first two Masters titles and reached his first Grand Slam final

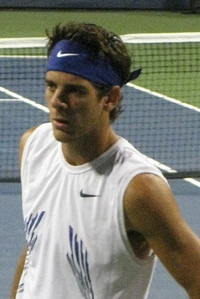
Juan Martín del Potro became the first man to win his first four titles in a row

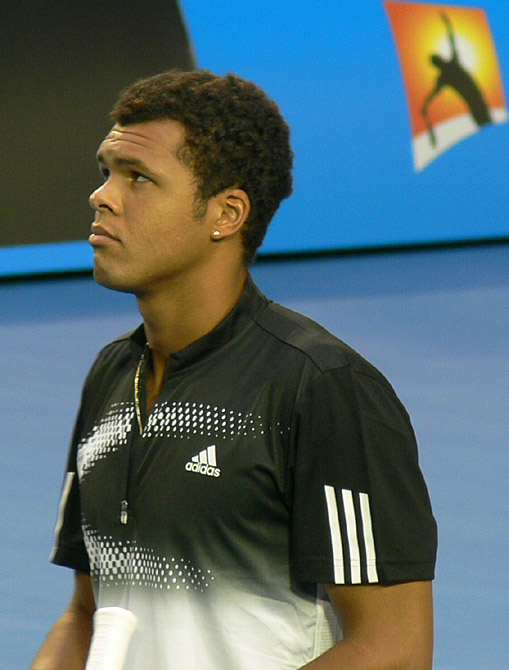
Jo-Wilfried Tsonga qualified by winning his first Masters shield

The fourth qualifier, announced after the US Open on September 9, was Andy Murray of Great Britain, who secured his first Tennis Masters Cup ticket – the first for a Briton since Tim Henman in the 2004 edition.

Andy Murray, who started the year just outside the Top Ten, qualified after improving his Grand Slam performances throughout the season. After defeats in the first round of the Australian Open (lost to Tsonga), and in the third round of the French Open (lost to Almagro), Murray reached his first quarterfinals in a major at the Wimbledon Championships (lost to Nadal), after coming back from a two-sets-to-love deficit to beat 2007 Wimbledon semifinalist Richard Gasquet in the fourth round. Murray capped his season in majors with his first Grand Slam final – the first for a Briton since Greg Rusedski lost in the 1997 US Open final – at the US Open (lost to Federer), after defeating Nadal, in his first tournament as World No. 1, in the semifinals. By that time in the season, Murray had already won two International Series titles in Doha (def. Wawrinka), Marseille (def. Ančić) and his first Masters Series shield in Cincinnati (def. Djokovic). Murray consolidated his fourth place in the rankings after the US Open by winning two more titles at the Madrid Masters (def. Simon) and in Saint Petersburg (def. Golubev), where he was the defending champion.

The fifth player to be selected, on October 19, was Nikolay Davydenko of Russia, who obtained his fourth consecutive qualification for the year-end championships.

Nikolay Davydenko, a two-time Grand Slam semifinalist in 2007, never went into second week at a major in 2008. He had early exits in the fourth round at the Australian Open (lost to Youzhny), in the third round at the French Open (lost to Ljubičić), in the first round at the Wimbledon Championships (lost to Becker), and in the fourth round at the US Open (lost to Müller). Though he did not defend his 2007 title in Moscow, Davydenko performed better in smaller events in 2008, reaching an International Series final in Estoril (lost to Federer), and winning two International Series titles in Pörtschach (def. Mónaco) and Warsaw (def. Robredo), and his second career Masters shield in Miami (def. Nadal).

The last three qualifiers, who locked their spots during the final event before the year-end championships, at the Paris Masters, were Andy Roddick of the United States, qualified for the sixth straight year (withdrew in 2005) on October 30, Juan Martín del Potro of Argentina, and Jo-Wilfried Tsonga of France, who both qualified in the last two days of the event and ended in the Top Eight for the first time.

Andy Roddick did not perform as well as in previous seasons in Grand Slam tournaments, exiting in the third round of the Australian Open (lost to Kohlschreiber), withdrawing from the 2008 French Open (due to a right shoulder injury contracted in the semifinals of the Rome Masters), crashing in a four-setter in the second round of Wimbledon (lost to Tipsarević), and matching his 2007 US Open performance with a quarterfinal in New York (lost to Djokovic). During the rest of the season, Roddick lost one final in Los Angeles (lost to del Potro), and captured three titles in San Jose (def. Štěpánek), Dubai (def. López), and Beijing (def. Sela), clinching the qualification when he reached the quarterfinals of the Paris Masters.

Juan Martín del Potro lost in the second round of all first three majors; at the Australian Open (lost to Ferrer), the French Open (lost to Bolelli), and Wimbledon (lost to Wawrinka). After Wimbledon, del Potro went on to win his first four titles in as many tournaments in Stuttgart (def. Gasquet), Kitzbühel (def Melzer), Los Angeles (def. Roddick) and Washington (def. Troicki), becoming the first player ever to do so. In the rest of the year, del Potro extended his 23-match streak to the quarterfinals of the US Open (lost to Murray), and reached another final in Tokyo (lost to Berdych). Del Potro's qualification came during the Paris Masters, when Tsonga defeated other Masters Cup hopeful James Blake, the only other contender for del Potro's place, in the semifinals.

Jo-Wilfried Tsonga, ranked 38 on January 1, defeated Murray, Gasquet and Nadal en route to his first final in the ATP Tour at the Australian Open (lost to Djokovic). Sidelined during three months of the season due to a right knee injury, Tsonga missed both the French Open and Wimbledon, coming back to competition at the US Open where he was defeated in the third round (lost to Robredo). Tsonga won his first career title in a rematch of the Australian Open final in the International Series event of Bangkok (def. Djokovic), and earned his Tennis Masters Cup qualification with his second career title (his first Masters Series shield) at the Paris Masters (def. Nalbandian).

After Nadal's withdrawal on November 3, the ninth player of the ATP Race, Gilles Simon of France, was elevated to the playing field, for his first career qualification.

Gilles Simon, one of fifteen Frenchmen of the ATP Top 100 at the beginning of the year, did not perform well in Grand Slam events, losing in the third round of the Australian Open (lost to Nadal), the first round of the French Open (lost to Štěpánek), the third round of Wimbledon (lost to Gasquet), and the third round of the US Open (lost to del Potro). His ninth place at the race resulted from three titles in Casablanca (def. Benneteau), Indianapolis (def. Tursunov), and Bucharest (def. Moyá), a semifinals run at the Canada Masters, and a final at the Madrid Masters (lost to Murray).

=== Doubles ===
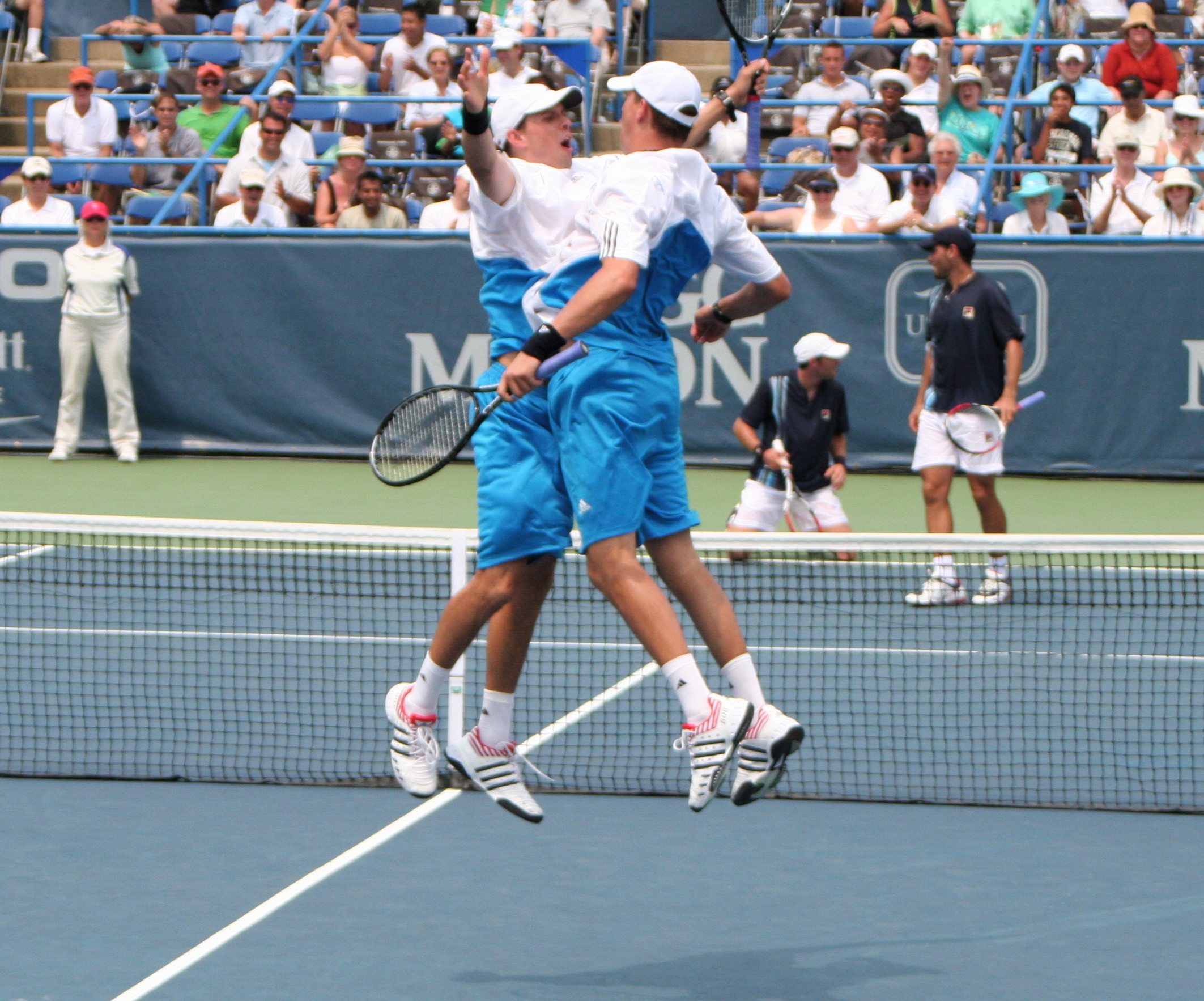
Bob Bryan and Mike Bryan returned to the Masters Cup after missing the 2007 edition due to injury

The first two teams to qualify for the year-end doubles tournament were selected on July 9. They were World No. 1 duo Bob Bryan and Mike Bryan from the United States, and then-ATP Race-leaders Daniel Nestor of Canada and Nenad Zimonjić of Serbia. The Bryan brothers qualified for their sixth straight Tennis Masters Cup appearance (withdrew in 2007), while Nestor qualified for the tenth time, the first with another partner than Mark Knowles, and Zimonjić qualified for the third time.

Bob Bryan and Mike Bryan started their 2008 season with an unsuccessful defense of their 2007 Australian Open title, where they were upset in the quarterfinals of the Australian Open (lost to Bhupathi/Knowles). The Bryans matched their 2007 French Open performance with a quarterfinal appearance in Paris (lost to Cuevas/Horna), but were again upset before the final in Wimbledon (lost to Björkman/Ullyett), leaving the tournament without ever dropping serve. When they qualified, the Bryan brothers had already reached eight finals, losing five – in Sydney (lost to Gasquet/Tsonga), Delray Beach (lost to Mirnyi/Murray), San Jose (lost to Lipsky/Martin), Las Vegas (lost to Benneteau/Llodra), and Hamburg (lost to Nestor/Zimonjić) – and winning the other three in Miami (def. Bhupathi/Knowles), Barcelona (def. Fyrstenberg/Matkowski), and Rome (def. Nestor/Zimonjić). After Wimbledon, the Bryans entered the US Open without a Grand Slam title for the first time since 2005. They ended their title drought in majors by winning their second final in New York (def. Dlouhý/Paes), their sixth Grand Slam crown overall. The Bryans also won the bronze medal at the 2008 Beijing Summer Olympics, defeating Clément/Llodra, after they were upset in the semifinals by Federer/Wawrinka, and reached two more finals, losing in Toronto (lost to Nestor/Zimonjić), and winning in Cincinnati (def. Erlich/Ram).

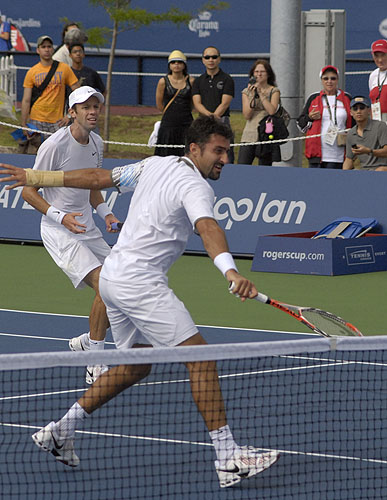
Daniel Nestor and Nenad Zimonjić qualified with a shot at the year-end No. 1 spot

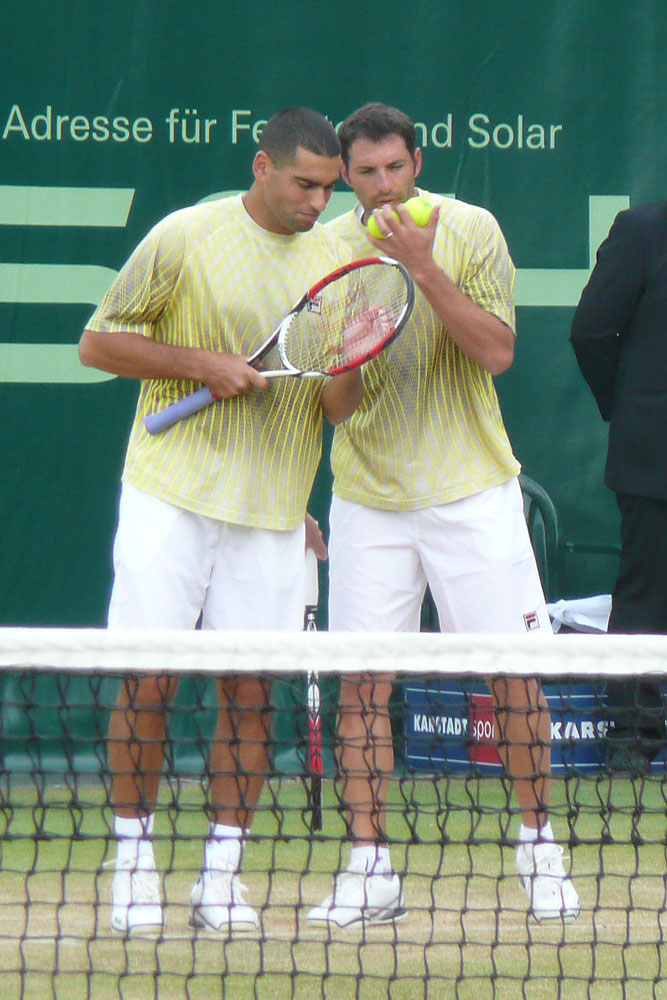
Jonathan Erlich and Andy Ram became the first Israelis to win a Grand Slam

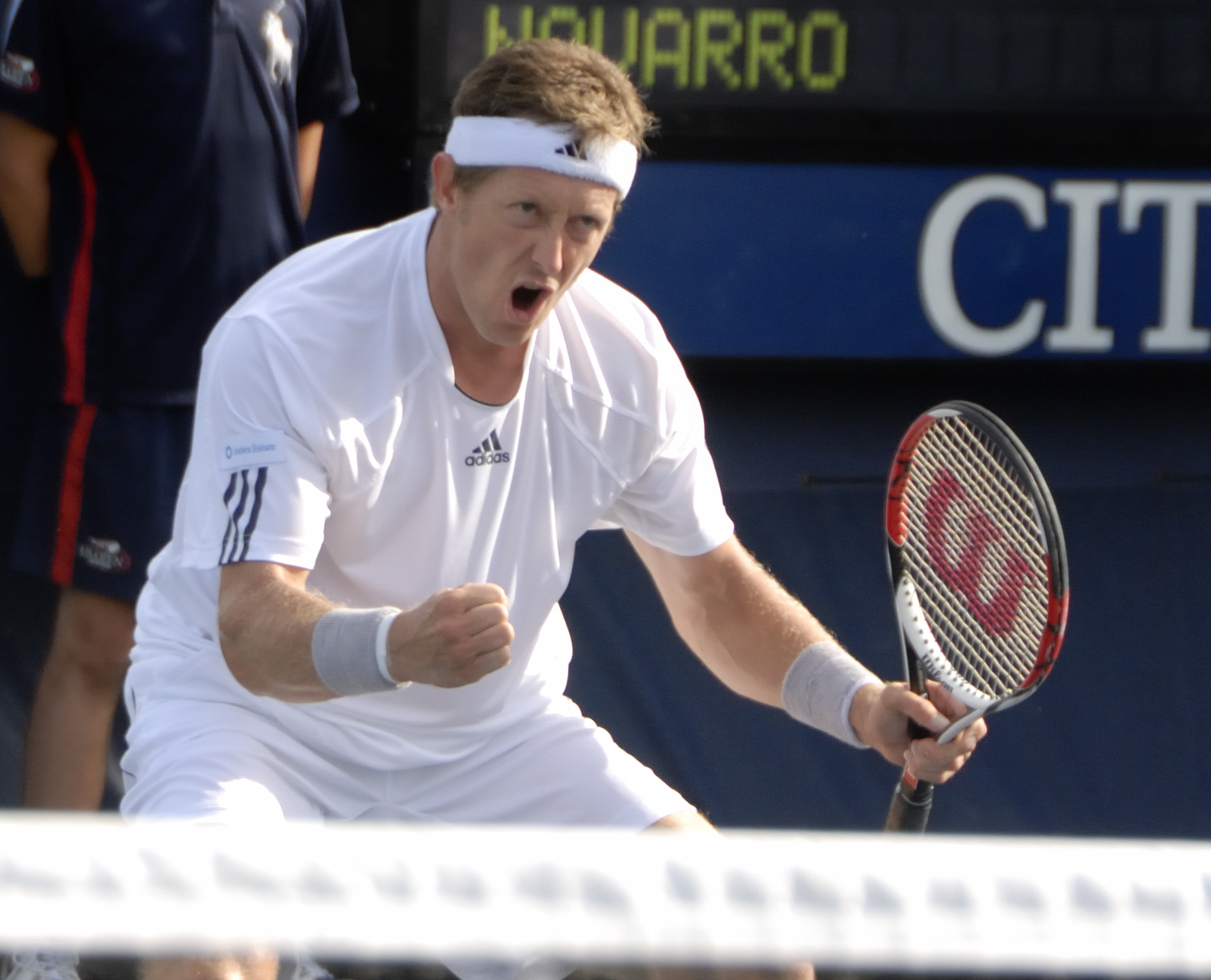
Jonas Björkman retired after seventeen years playing in singles and doubles

Daniel Nestor and Nenad Zimonjić, who had previously partnered for four events in 2007, started their first full season together with an appearance in the Australian Open quarterfinals (lost to Clément/Llodra), and the final of the French Open, which Nestor had won the previous year with Knowles (lost to Cuevas/Horna). The pair qualified after winning their first Grand Slam title together at the Wimbledon Championships (def. Björkman/Ullyett). The title was Zimonjić's first in a major after three lost finals, and completed Nestor's career Golden Slam, having previously won the three other majors and the Gold Medal at the 2000 Sydney Olympics. Nestor and Zimonjić's partnership also led them to three ATP Masters Series finals in Indian Wells (lost to Erlich/Ram), Rome (lost to Bryan/Bryan), and Hamburg (def. Bryan/Bryan), and a final at London's Queen's Club (def. Melo/Sá). After clinching their first ticket as a team for the Tennis Masters Cup, Nestor and Zimonjić, who held the top spot of the ATP Race for several weeks, lost early in the third round of the US Open (lost to Nieminen/Lindstedt), and win one more title in Toronto (def. Bryan/Bryan).

The third team to qualify, announced on September 9, was the pairing of Jonathan Erlich and Andy Ram from Israel, who participated in the 2006 and 2007 editions of the event, losing each time in the round robin.

Jonathan Erlich and Andy Ram kicked off their season with their first Grand Slam title at the Australian Open (def. Clément/Llodra), becoming the first Israeli players to capture a major title in tennis history. Erlich and Ram did not match that performance in the remaining majors of the year, exiting in the third round at the French Open, in the quarterfinals at Wimbledon (lost to Dlouhý/Paes), and in the second round at the US Open (lost to Robredo/Roitman). Upset in the first round of the Olympic doubles event by Clément/Llodra, Erlich and Ram reached two other tournaments finals in the season, in Masters Series events of Indian Wells (def. Nestor/Zimonjić) and Cincinnati (lost to Bryan/Bryan). Sidelined by a recurring elbow injury since the Davis Cup World Group play-offs against Peru, Erlich did not participate in any event after the US Open. Partnering with different other players in the rest of the season, Ram won two more titles; partnering with Max Mirnyi in Vienna (def. Petzschner/Peya) and in Lyon, and partnering with Michaël Llodra (def. Huss/Hutchins).

The fourth and fifth teams selected for the Tennis Masters Cup, on October 19, were the pairing of Mahesh Bhupathi from India and Mark Knowles – one of the two defending champions – from The Bahamas, who secured respectively their eighth and eleventh spots for the season championships, and the then-13th-ranked duo of Pablo Cuevas from Uruguay and Luis Horna from Peru, who qualified as Grand Slam champions certain to finish the year within the Top 20 of the ATP Race rankings, and reached the year-end event for the first time.

Mahesh Bhupathi and Mark Knowles started competing together in 2008 with a deep run at the Australian Open, in which they defeated defending champions Bryan/Bryan, before losing in the semifinals (lost to Erlich/Ram). Bhupathi and Knowles exited in the first round of the French Open, where Knowles was the defending champion (lost to Huss/Hutchins), and in Wimbledon (lost to Petzschner/Peya). At the US Open, the pair did not get past the third round (lost to González/Mónaco). Despite the poor season in majors, Bhupathi and Knowles reached five finals in Vienna (lost to Mirnyi/Ram), Madrid (lost to Fyrstenberg/Matkowski), Memphis (def. Ratiwatana/Ratiwatana), Dubai (def. Damm/Vízner), Basel (def. Kas/Kohlschreiber).

Pablo Cuevas and Luis Horna did not start their partnership until the French Open, in which they upset four seeded teams (Clément/Llodra; Dlouhý/Paes; Bryan/Bryan; Nestor/Zimonjić) to win their first Grand Slam title, the first ever claimed by a South American team. Cuevas and Horna entered two more tournaments together in the rest of the season, losing in the second round of the US Open (lost to de Voest/Fisher), and the first in Washington (lost to Gicquel/Lindstedt). The pair had more success separately, as Cuevas reached the final in Houston, partnering with Marcel Granollers (lost to Gulbis/Schüttler), and Horna won two titles in Auckland, partnering with Juan Mónaco (def. Malisse/Melzer), and Buenos Aires, partnering with Agustín Calleri (def. Eschauer/Luczak).

The sixth and seventh teams to enter the field on October 26 were the duo of Jonas Björkman of Sweden and Kevin Ullyett of Zimbabwe, who qualified for their seventh and fifth year-end finale (their first together), and the pair of Lukáš Dlouhý of the Czech Republic and Leander Paes of India, who qualified for their second and ninth year-end finale (their first together).

Jonas Björkman and Kevin Ullyett reached the quarterfinals at the French Open (lost to Soares/Vemic), the first major of their season, and were defeated in the Wimbledon final (lost to Nestor/Zimonjić). Set to retire at the end of 2008, Björkman entered the US Open and was knocked out in the second round (lost to Kas/Petzschner). Björkman and Ullyett had won one title together in Stockholm (def. Brunström/Ryderstedt) by October, then clinched one more after they qualified, in Paris (def. Coetzee/Moodie). Björkman also won in Båstad (def. Brunstrom/Rojer), partnering with Robin Söderling. Ullyett reached two finals with Bruno Soares in Nottingham (def. Coetzee/Murray) and Washington (lost to Gicquel/Lindstedt), and one with Jamie Murray in Estoril (lost to Coetzee/Moodie).

Lukáš Dlouhý and Leander Paes, who started the season with different partners, František Čermák and Paul Hanley respectively, debuted their partnership at the French Open, where they reached the third round (lost to Cuevas/Horna), and found success in Wimbledon, where they reached the semifinals (lost to Nestor/Zimonjić), and the US Open, where they reached their first Grand Slam final together (lost to Bryan/Bryan). Aside from the majors, Dlouhý and Paes reached three other finals together: in Bangkok (def. Lipsky/Martin), Halle (lost to Youhzny/Zverev), and Tokyo (lost to Youzhny/Zverev).

At the Paris Masters, several teams competed for the last spot of the Tennis Masters Cup doubles event. Jeff Coetzee and Wesley Moodie from South Africa eventually finished runners-up, gathering enough points to reach their first year-end event together – the first ever for Coetzee, the second for Moodie (after 2005).

Jeff Coetzee and Wesley Moodie climbed to the eighth place of the Race starting with a semifinal at the Australian Open (lost to Clément/Llodra), followed by early losses in the second round of the French Open (lost to Tipsarević/Troicki), and of Wimbledon (lost to López/Verdasco). Coetzee partnered with Rogier Wassen at the US Open, where they were beaten in the first round (lost to González/Mónaco). Coetzee and Moodie reached three tournaments finals together during the season: in Doha (lost to Kohlschreiber/Škoch), Estoril (def. Murray/Ullyett), and Paris (lost to Björkman/Ullyett). Individually, Coetzee also reached two finals in Marseille, partnering with Yves Allegro (lost to Damm/Vizner), and Nottingham, partnering with Jamie Murray (lost to Soares/Ullyett).

After Jonathan Erlich and Andy Ram's withdrawal on November 3, the eighth team of the ATP Doubles Race, Mariusz Fyrstenberg and Marcin Matkowski of Poland, were selected as replacements.

Mariusz Fyrstenberg and Marcin Matkowski never got further than the third round in majors in 2008, exiting in the third at the Australian Open (lost to Bhupathi/Knowles), the second at the French Open (lost to Mertiňák/Scherrer), and the first in Wimbledon (lost to Bopanna/Qureshi) and at the US Open (lost to Andreev/Zverev). Despite the poor runs in majors, Fyrstenberg and Matkowski reached five finals in Barcelona (lost to Bryan/Bryan), Warsaw (def. Davydenko/Schukin), Bucharest (lost to Devilder/Mathieu), Metz (lost to Clément/Llodra), and Madrid (def. Bhupathi/Knowles).

== Points breakdown ==
=== Singles ===
| Rank | Player | Grand Slam | | | | ATP World Tour Masters 1000 | | | | | | | | | Best Other | | | | | Total points | Tourn |
|---|---|---|---|---|---|---|---|---|---|---|---|---|---|---|---|---|---|---|---|---|---|
| Rank | Player | AUS | FRA | WIM | USO | IW | MIA | MC | ROM | HAM | CAN | CIN | MAD | PAR | 1 | 2 | 3 | 4 | 5 | Total points | Tourn |
| — | (Spain) Rafael Nadal | SF; 90 | W 200 | W 200 | SF; 90 | SF; 45 | F 70 | W 100 | R32; 1 | W 100 | W 100 | SF; 45 | SF; 45 | QF; 25 | G 80 | W 60 | W 45 | F 24 | QF; 15 | 1,335 | 19 |
| 1 | (Switzerland) Roger Federer | SF; 90 | F 140 | F 140 | W 200 | SF; 45 | QF; 25 | F 70 | QF; 25 | F 70 | R32; 1 | R16; 15 | SF; 45 | QF; 25 | W 50 | W 45 | W 35 | QF; 20 | R32; 0 | 1,041 | 18 |
| 2 | (Serbia) Novak Djokovic | W 200 | SF; 90 | R64; 7 | SF; 90 | W 100 | R64; 1 | SF; 45 | W 100 | SF; 45 | QF; 25 | F 70 | R16; 15 | R16; 15 | B 41 | F 31 | SF; 27 | F 24 | R16; 3 | 929 | 18 |
| 3 | (United Kingdom) Andy Murray | R128; 1 | R32; 15 | QF; 50 | F 140 | R16; 15 | R64; 1 | R16; 15 | R32; 7 | R16; 15 | SF; 45 | W 100 | W 100 | QF; 25 | W 50 | W 50 | W 40 | QF; 15 | R32; 0 | 684 | 22 |
| 4 | (Russia) Nikolay Davydenko | R16; 30 | R32; 15 | R128; 1 | R16; 30 | R32; 7 | W 100 | SF; 45 | R16; 15 | R16; 15 | R16; 15 | R32; 1 | R32; 1 | SF; 45 | W 35 | W 35 | SF; 27 | F 24 | SF; 22 | 463 | 22 |
| 5 | (United States) Andy Roddick | R32; 15 | A 0 | R64; 7 | QF; 50 | R64; 1 | SF; 45 | A 0 | SF; 45 | A 0 | R16; 15 | A 0 | R16; 15 | QF; 25 | W 60 | W 35 | W 35 | F 24 | SF; 22 | 394 | 22 |
| 6 | (France) Jo-Wilfried Tsonga | F 140 | A 0 | A 0 | R32; 15 | R16; 15 | R32; 7 | A 0 | R32; 1 | R32; 7 | A 0 | A 0 | R16; 15 | W 100 | W 35 | SF; 20 | SF; 15 | SF; 15 | R16; 5 | 390 | 20 |
| 7 | (Argentina) Juan Martín del Potro | R64; 7 | R64; 7 | R64; 7 | QF; 50 | SF; 22 | R64; 4 | SF; 15 | R64; 4 | QF; 8 | A 0 | A 0 | QF; 25 | R16; 15 | W 50 | W 50 | W 35 | W 35 | F 35 | 369 | 20 |
| 8 | (France) Gilles Simon | R32; 15 | R32; 15 | R128; 1 | R32; 15 | R64; 4 | R128; 1 | R64; 1 | R32; 7 | R32; 7 | SF; 45 | R32; 7 | F 70 | R16; 15 | W 36 | W 35 | W 35 | SF; 27 | SF; 20 | 356 | 28 |

- Ranking points in italics indicate that a player did not qualify for (or used an exemption to skip) a Grand Slam or Masters 1000 event and substituted his next best result in its place.

=== Doubles ===
| Rk | Name | 1 | 2 | 3 | 4 | 5 | 6 | 7 | 8 | 9 | 10 | 11 | 12 | 13 | 14 | Total | Tour |
|---|---|---|---|---|---|---|---|---|---|---|---|---|---|---|---|---|---|
| 1 | (United States) Bob Bryan (United States) Mike Bryan | W 200 | W 100 | W 100 | W 100 | SF; 90 | F 70 | F 70 | W 60 | QF; 50 | QF; 50 | QF; 25 | QF; 25 | QF; 25 | F 24 | 989 | 20 |
| 2 | (Canada) Daniel Nestor (Serbia) Nenad Zimonjić | W 200 | F 140 | W 100 | W 100 | F 70 | F 70 | QF; 50 | W 45 | SF; 45 | R16; 30 | SF; 27 | QF; 25 | QF; 12 | QF; 12 | 926 | 21 |
| 3 | (India) Mahesh Bhupathi (The Bahamas) Mark Knowles | SF; 90 | F 70 | F 70 | F 70 | W 60 | SF; 45 | W 45 | R16; 30 | F 28 | QF; 25 | QF; 25 | QF; 22 | SF; 15 | QF; 8 | 593 | 20 |
| 4 | (Sweden) Jonas Björkman (Zimbabwe) Kevin Ullyett | F 140 | W 100 | QF; 50 | W 45 | SF; 45 | SF; 45 | SF; 45 | QF; 25 | QF; 25 | R16; 15 | SF; 15 | R32; 15 | QF; 11 | R16; 0 | 576 | 18 |
| — | (Israel) Jonathan Erlich (Israel) Andy Ram | W 200 | W 100 | F 70 | QF; 50 | R16; 30 | SF; 27 | QF; 25 | SF; 15 | R32; 15 | QF; 11 | QF; 8 | R16; 0 | R16; 0 | R32; 0 | 551 | 17 |
| 5 | (South Africa) Jeff Coetzee (South Africa) Wesley Moodie | SF; 90 | F 70 | SF; 45 | SF; 45 | SF; 45 | F 42 | W 35 | SF; 20 | R32; 15 | R16; 15 | R16; 15 | R32; 15 | R16; 0 | QF; 0 | 445 | 16 |
| 6 | (Czech Republic) Lukáš Dlouhý (India) Leander Paes | F 140 | SF; 90 | SF; 45 | W 35 | F 35 | F 31 | R16; 30 | QF; 25 | QF; 12 | R16; 0 | R16; 0 | | | | 443 | 11 |
| 7 | (Poland) Mariusz Fyrstenberg (Poland) Marcin Matkowski | W 100 | SF; 45 | F 42 | W 35 | R16; 30 | QF; 25 | QF; 25 | F 24 | F 24 | R32; 15 | R16; 15 | R16; 15 | R16; 15 | QF; 15 | 425 | 27 |
| 12 | (Uruguay) Pablo Cuevas (Peru) Luis Horna | W 200 | R32; 15 | R16; 0 | | | | | | | | | | | | 215 | 3 |

== Build-up ==
=== Withdrawals ===
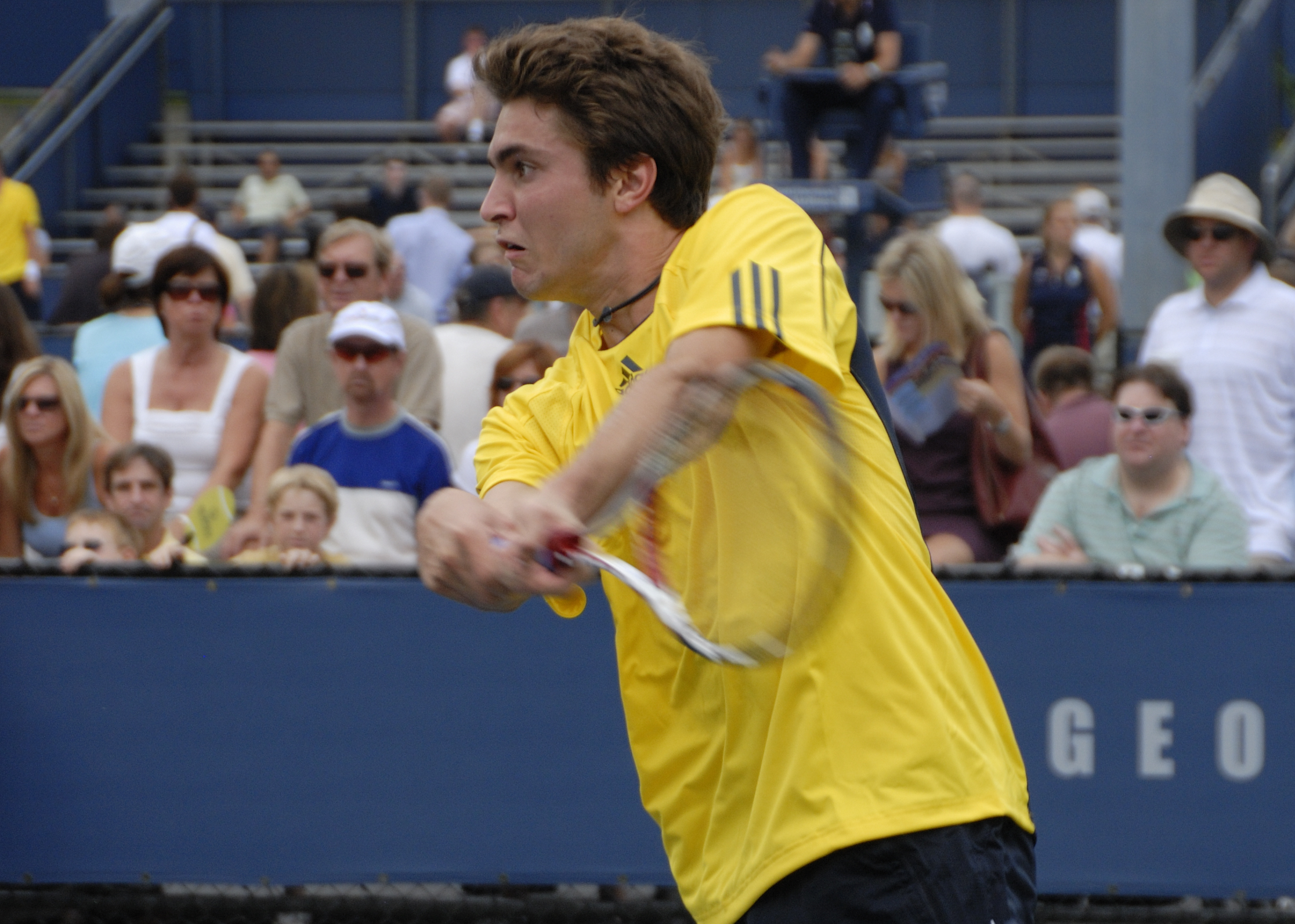
Gilles Simon was eighth in the Race before Tsonga qualified

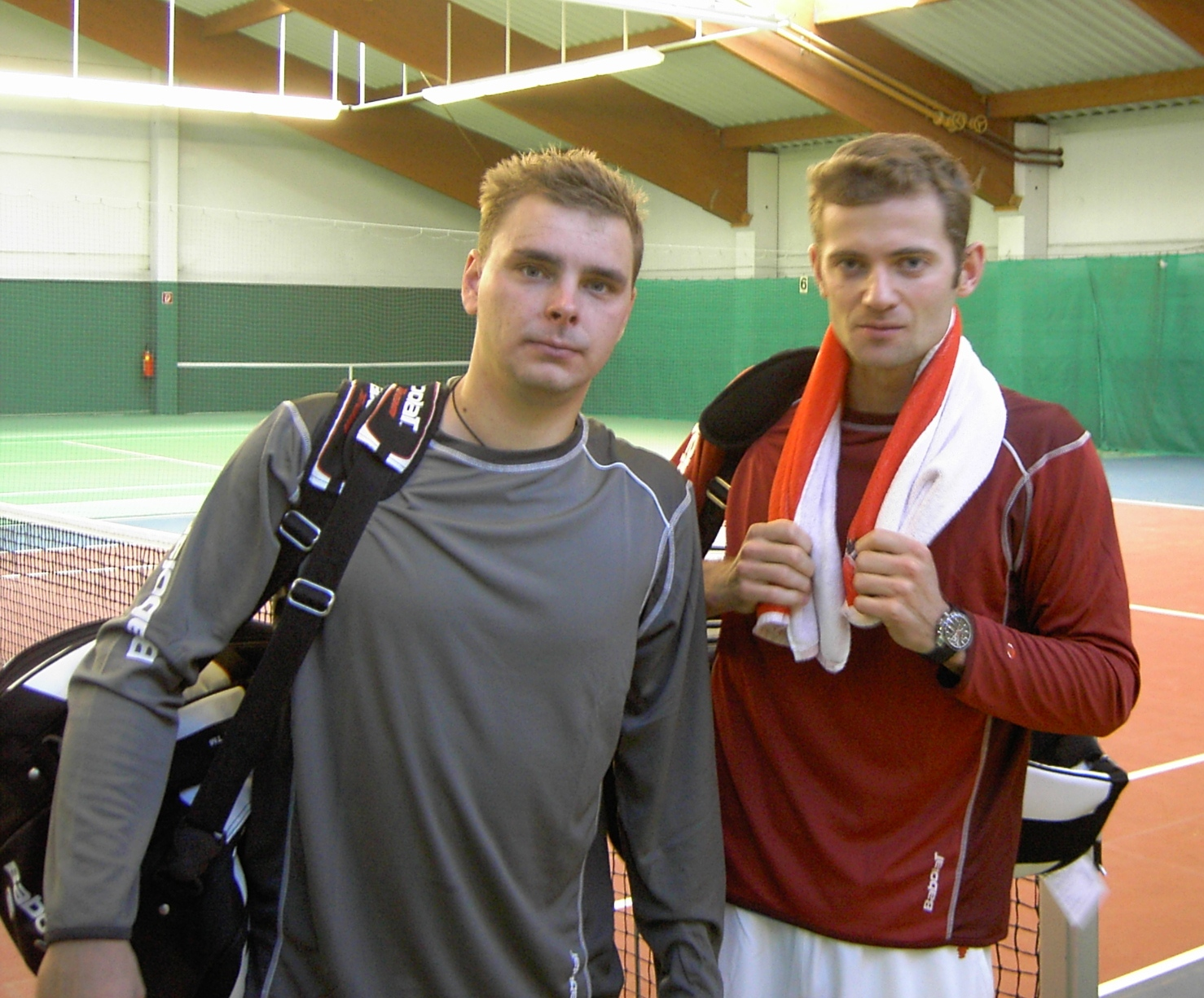
Marcin Matkowski and Mariusz Fyrstenberg won their first Masters title in Madrid

Four days after retiring from his quarterfinal against Nikolay Davydenko at the Paris Masters due to a recurring right knee injury, ATP Race-leader Rafael Nadal announced on November 3 that he would withdraw from the year-end championships, for the second time in four qualifications. Nadal had already pulled out of the 2005 Tennis Masters Cup due to a left foot injury before his opening match against Gastón Gaudio, and was replaced by alternate Mariano Puerta. Nadal's withdrawal in 2008 happened as the Spaniard was scheduled to lead his country's Davis Cup team in the event's final, to be played five days after the Tennis Masters Cup in Mar del Plata, Argentina, on indoor hard courts, against an Argentinian team led by Stockholm titlist, Basel and Paris runner-up David Nalbandian, and other year-end event qualifier Juan Martín del Potro. Nadal cited the Davis Cup final necessary preparation as another reason to withdraw from the event, saying: "I want to recover and be ready for the important Davis Cup final with my country that will be played in Mar del Plata, Argentina". He eventually announced, on November 10, his withdrawal from the Davis Cup final (set to be played November 21–23), due to his knee injury.

Nadal's withdrawal elevated the first alternate, Gilles Simon, into the draw, making him the second Frenchman of the eight-men field, alongside Jo-Wilfried Tsonga, and marking the first time that two Frenchmen participated in the year-end event since the Masters Grand Prix event of 1986, in which Yannick Noah and Henri Leconte competed. Simon was ranked eighth in the ATP Race entering the Paris Masters thanks to his final in Madrid and his semifinal at the Grand Prix de Tennis de Lyon, where he lost to eventual champion Robin Söderling, but was knocked out of the Top Eight when he lost to Andy Roddick in the third round, and Tsonga qualified by winning the title. Simon, who flew to Shanghai with countryman and friend Jo-Wilfried Tsonga on November 5, commented on Nadal's withdrawal and his first selection for the year-end event: "I was unhappy that he had to pull out. I would really have preferred to qualify directly by finishing eighth. It's not in my nature to wish that another player can't play. [...] I'm really happy to be going there and I really want to experience this."

On the same day, Israeli Jonathan Erlich, who had been suffering from an elbow injury since September, also announced he was pulling out from the doubles field, alongside his partner Andy Ram, with whom he had won the Australian Open in January. Hoping that Erlich would be fit to play the year-end event, Ram had continued to compete with different players between September and the last ATP Tour event before the Masters Cup. During that period, he won a Davis Cup World Group Play-off match against Peru with Harel Levy, an ATP International Series Gold title in Vienna against Philipp Petzschner and Alexander Peya with Max Mirnyi, lost to Pablo Andújar and Marcel Granollers in the first round of the Madrid Masters with Mikhail Youzhny, won another title in Lyon against Stephen Huss and Ross Hutchins with Michaël Llodra, and eventually lost in the quarterfinals of the Paris Masters to Arnaud Clément and Michaël Llodra, with Bruno Soares.

Erlich and Ram's exit allowed the first alternates, Mariusz Fyrstenberg and Marcin Matkowski, to join the eight-team field days after they lost a chance to qualify regularly during the Paris Masters. Fyrstenberg and Matkowski, who had boosted their chances to qualify by winning the Madrid Masters, met Jeff Coetzee and Wesley Moodie in the semifinals of Paris, as both teams were vying for the seventh spot of the Race. Fyrstenberg and Matkowski were then beaten in straight sets, and denied a guaranteed spot in Shanghai. Their qualification as alternates marked their second appearance at the Masters Cup after a previous run in 2006, where they lost all of their round robin matches.

=== Alternates ===
Although the ATP Rulebook states that the two players immediately ranked after the last qualifier at the Masters Cup should be selected as singles alternates, and be present at the event's location, only two players ranked in the Top 35 of the ATP Race, after Gilles Simon, accepted the invitation to come to Shanghai : 26th-ranked Radek Štěpánek of the Czech Republic, and 35th-ranked Nicolas Kiefer of Germany. Among the twenty-four players who declined to come – because they needed to prepare for the Davis Cup final, for reasons of injury, or to preserve themselves for the next season – were James Blake, David Nalbandian, 2007 Tennis Masters Cup finalist David Ferrer, Stanislas Wawrinka, 2007 qualifier Fernando González, Fernando Verdasco, Gaël Monfils, Robin Söderling, Igor Andreev, Nicolás Almagro, Tomáš Berdych, Tommy Robredo, Marin Čilić, Mardy Fish, 2007 qualifier Richard Gasquet, Ivo Karlović, Philipp Kohlschreiber, Dmitry Tursunov, Marat Safin, Feliciano López, Paul-Henri Mathieu, Mikhail Youzhny, Rainer Schüttler and Mario Ančić.

Czech Radek Štěpánek, who started the year as No. 30 and ranked as high as No. 12 on July 7, had his best Grand Slam performance at the French Open, where he reached the fourth round, losing to David Ferrer in five sets on the score of 4–6, 6–2, 1–6, 6–3, 6–3. Štěpánek reached one final in the season in San Jose (lost to Roddick), and reached the semifinals at four events, in Sydney (lost to Guccione), Memphis (lost to Söderling), Rome (retired due to illness against Djokovic), and Metz (lost to Tursunov).

Former World No. 4 Nicolas Kiefer, who qualified once for the year-end event at the 1999 ATP Tour World Championships, where he reached the semifinals (lost to Sampras), did not get past the third round at a Grand Slam event in 2008 but reached his first tournament final since Saint Petersburg in 2005, his first career ATP Masters Series final – and his only final of the season – at the Toronto Masters (lost to Nadal). His other best results included a semifinal in Halle (lost to Federer), and a quarterfinal at the Hamburg Masters (lost to Seppi).

The substitutes for the doubles event, ranked in the ninth position of the ATP Doubles Race, directly after Fyrstenberg and Matkowski, were Marcelo Melo and André Sá from Brazil.

Partnering together since 2006, Marcelo Melo and André Sá advanced the third round in Grand Slam events in 2008, having been knocked out in the first round of the Australian Open (lost to Arnold Ker/López), the second at the French Open (lost to Ram/Reynolds), the third in Wimbledon (withdrew against Anderson/Lindstedt), and the first at the US Open (lost to Robredo/Roitman). The pair lost one final at London's Queen's Club (lost to Nestor/Zimonjić), but won three titles in Costa do Sauípe (def. Montañés/Ventura), Pörtschach (def. Knowle/Melzer), and New Haven (def. Bhupathi/Knowles).

=== Groupings ===
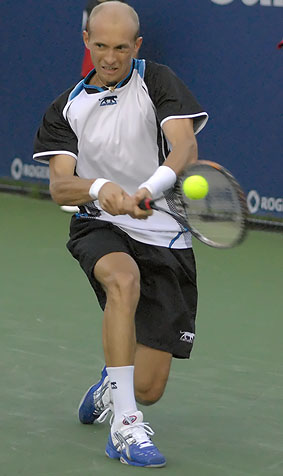
Nikolay Davydenko won his second Masters shield in Miami against Nadal

The draw ceremony, which divided the eight competing players/teams in the two round robin groups, took place on November 5, in Shanghai's Hilton hotel, in attendance by ATP No. 4 Andy Murray. With Rafael Nadal withdrawn due to a knee injury, Roger Federer took the top seed and the heading of the Red Group; Novak Djokovic took the second seed, headlining the Gold Group. Federer was drawn alongside Murray, Andy Roddick and Nadal's replacement Gilles Simon, while Djokovic was joined in his group by Nikolay Davydenko, Juan Martín del Potro and Jo-Wilfried Tsonga.

The Red Group's composition set several rematches of the year's encounters, confronting Federer with three players against which he lost in their last meeting – having been defeated by Roddick in the quarterfinals of the Miami Masters, losing to him for the second time in their seventeen matches against each other; by Simon in their only meeting in the second round of the Toronto Masters; and by Murray in the semifinals of the Madrid Masters. Federer and Murray's match was their fourth encounter of the year, after a first round match in Dubai (won by Murray), the US Open final (won by Federer), and a Madrid semifinal (won by Murray), which brought their head-to-head record to 2–3 in Murray's favor. The announced meeting of Murray and Simon was also a rematch, that of Madrid Masters' final, which Murray won in straight sets, defeating the Frenchman for the second time in the year, after a second round at the Hamburg Masters, to lead their head-to-head 2–1. Roddick's encounter with Simon was to be their third career meeting, the second in 2008 after a Paris Masters third round (won by Roddick), which helped the American clinch his spot at the Tennis Masters Cup, and prevented Simon to gather enough points to qualify directly for the event. Finally, Roddick and Murray's meeting, their seventh overall, in a head-to-head led by Murray 4–2, was to be their first real match of the year, as Murray withdrew due to a thumb injury before what could have been their previous 2008 encounter, in the Queen's Club Championships quarterfinals.

Gold Group leader Novak Djokovic, who lost all three of his round robin matches at the 2007 Tennis Masters Cup to Nadal, Richard Gasquet and David Ferrer, was set to meet Jo-Wilfried Tsonga for the fourth time of the year, having lost their last two meetings in Bangkok's final and Paris Masters' third round, after their first encounter in the Australian Open's final (won by Djokovic). Djokovic's eventual meetings with Davydenko and del Potro were also uncertain for the Serb, as Djokovic had to retire in his only encounter with Davydenko, in a deciding match of the Davis Cup's first round, and had not met del Potro since a third round at the 2007 US Open, before the Argentinian elevated his level of play in the end of 2008 to enter the Top Ten. Del Potro's meeting with Davydenko was to be their third overall, their second that year, and give an advantage in their head-to-head record to either player, who had previously won one match against each other, with Davydenko defeating del Potro in the second round of the 2007 Paris Masters –when del Potro, a qualifier, had a ranking of only 51–, and the Argentinian avenging this loss by crushing the Russian in the Davis Cup semifinals 6–1, 6–4, 6–2. Tsonga entered the competition with a 0–1 record against both del Potro and Davydenko, but with each meeting (versus del Potro in New Haven, versus Davydenko in Moscow) coming in the 2007 season, before the Frenchman's rise in the rankings.

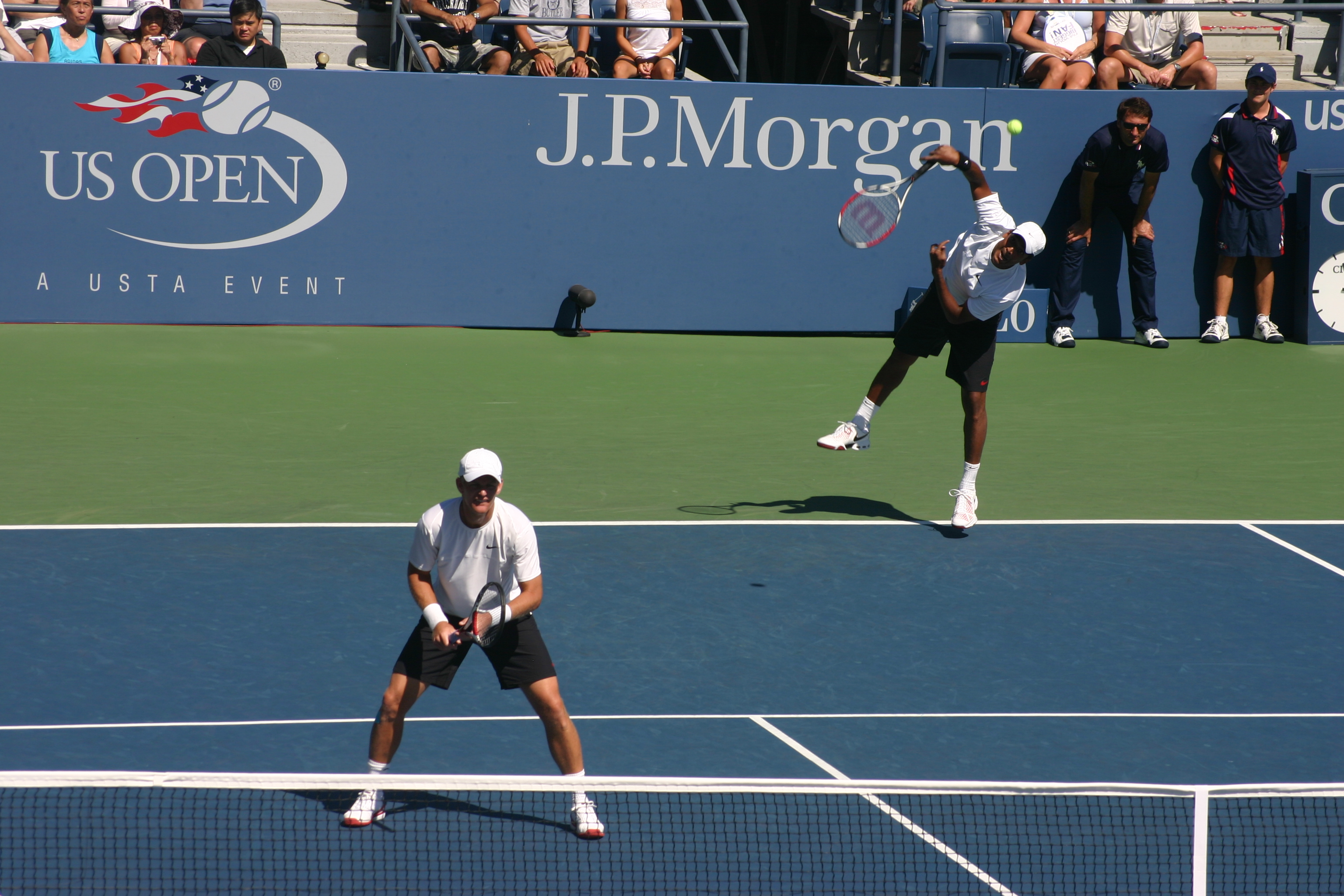
Defending champion Knowles qualified with his new partner Bhupathi

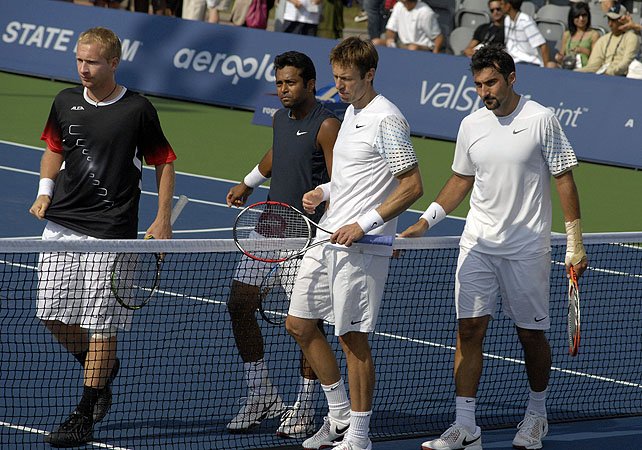
Dlouhý and Paes lost three times to Nestor and Zimonjić throughout the 2008 season

The repartition of the doubles teams also took place, with Bob and Mike Bryan holding the top seed, and headlining the Red Group, and defending champion Daniel Nestor and new partner Nenad Zimonjić taking upon the second seed and the head of the Gold Group. With the Bryans landed Mahesh Bhupathi and Mark Knowles, Jeff Coetzee and Wesley Moodie, and Pablo Cuevas and Luis Horna, while Nestor and Zimonjić were joined by Jonas Björkman and Kevin Ullyett, Lukáš Dlouhý and Leander Paes, and Erlich and Ram's replacements Mariusz Fyrstenberg and Marcin Matkowski.

Red Group top duo Bob and Mike Bryan, who had withdrawn from the 2007 Tennis Masters Cup due to an elbow injury for Mike Bryan, were set to face Mark Knowles, one of the two separated defending champions, and new partner Mahesh Bhupathi, for the fourth time in 2008, after meetings in the Australian Open quarterfinals (won by Bhupathi/Knowles), in the Miami Masters final (won by Bryan/Bryan), and in the Cincinnati Masters semifinals (won by Bryan/Bryan). The Bryans had also defeated Knowles, partnering fellow Bahamian Devin Mullings –then ranked 1017 in singles, not ranked in doubles– in the first round of the Beijing Olympics doubles tournament. The Bryan/Bryan-Coetzee/Moodie encounter was also a repeat of a matchup having already occurred three times in the season, at the Indian Wells Masters (won by Bryan/Bryan), the Miami Masters (won by Bryan/Bryan), and the Monte-Carlo Masters (won by Coetzee/Moodie). Coetzee and Moodie, after defeating the Bryans in Monte-Carlo Masters' quarterfinals, went on to lose in the semifinals to Bhupathi and Knowles, in their only meeting before the Masters Cup. Occasional doubles team of Cuevas and Horna, who competed in only three tournaments in the year, had a head-to-head record against only one of the three other teams, having upset the Bryan brothers in the French Open quarterfinals, en route to their Roland Garros title.

In the Gold Group were set rematches of the Wimbledon final, between champions Nestor and Zimonjić and Björkman and Ullyett, whose encounter at Wimbledon (won by Nestor/Zimonjić) was the only one in their career, as well as of a Wimbledon semifinal between Nestor and Zimonjić, and Dlouhý and Paes (won by Nestor/Zimonjić). Nestor and Zimonjić, and Dlouhý and Paes had met three times in the year before the Masters Cup, in the Wimbledon semifinal first, then in a Toronto Masters semifinal (won by Nestor/Zimonjić), and a Cincinnati Masters quarterfinal (won by Nestor/Zimonjić). The second seeds' perfect record in 2008 against Dlouhý and Paes also included a victory of the pair over Paes and Tommy Robredo in the Hamburg Masters semifinal, and of Nestor and Frédéric Niemeyer over Paes and Mahesh Bhupathi in the first round of Indianapolis, where both players were preparing for the Beijing Olympics. Previous matchups between the group's teams also included a 2–2 head-to-head record between Nestor and Zimonjić, and Fyrstenberg and Matkowski, with three meetings in 2008 in Sydney (won by Fyrstenberg/Matkowski), Rome (won by Nestor/Zimonjić), and Madrid (won by Fyrstenberg/Matkowski), and a second round in Monte Carlo between Fyrstenberg and Matkowski, and Björkman and Ullyett (won by Björkman/Ullyett). Finally, two encounters were to be first matchups in Shanghai, as neither Fyrstenberg and Matkowski nor Björkman and Ullyett entered the Tennis Masters Cup having played against the pairing of Dlouhý and Paes during the season.

== Day-by-day summaries ==
=== Day 1 ===
The first match of the competition to take place, on November 9, was the second career confrontation, in the doubles' Red Group, of Bob and Mike Bryan, and Pablo Cuevas and Luis Horna, since the South Americans upset the American duo at the French Open. The top seeded pair, which entered the tournament in a race with Gold Group leaders Daniel Nestor and Nenad Zimonjić to clinch the year-end No. 1 spot, overwhelmed Cuevas and Horna, in their fourth career hard court match together (with previously one win and two losses), racing to a 6–1 win in the first set, before their opponents fought back in the second, breaking to eventually lead 5–2, when the Americans rallied back to serve for the match at 6–5. Cuevas and Horna took the Bryans' serve once more to reach a tie-break, in which the Americans eventually prevailed to win the match 6–1, 7–6. The other match taking place on the first day opposed Mahesh Bhupathi and Mark Knowles to Jeff Coetzee and Wesley Moodie, and left the Indian-Bahamian pair victorious for the second time in two career meetings. Bhupathi and Knowles faced little resistance, breaking their adversaries three times to score a 6–2, 6–3 victory.

The singles event kicked off later in the day, first opposing ATP No. 3 Novak Djokovic to seventh seed Juan Martín del Potro. No upset was produced, as Djokovic scored his first career victory at the year-end championships, after losing all his matches at the 2007 edition, and increased his head-to-head against del Potro to 2–0, beating the Argentinian in straight sets. Djokovic had broken early in the first set, and was serving for the set at 5–3, when del Potro broke, and reached 5–5, before Djokovic took back the advantage, to win the set 7–5. In the second set, del Potro broke to lead 2–1, but Djokovic immediately levelled the score to 2–2, breaking again later in the set, and keeping his lead to a 7–5, 6–3 victory, in little less than two hours. In the second Gold Group match of the day, Nikolay Davydenko faced recent Paris Masters champion Jo-Wilfried Tsonga, in their second career meeting. Both players held their serve in the first set, to a tie-break the Russian eventually lost 6–8, on an unforced error, and the second set was just as tight, until Davydenko made one break at 5–4, levelling the match to one-set-all. The Russian broke early in the final set, and was serving for the match at 5–2, when Tsonga started a comeback, taking the match to a crucial tie-break. Davydenko then proved too solid for Tsonga, repeating his own performance from their only previous meeting, in Moscow, where he had won 7–0 in a first set tie break, and scored again a perfect tie-break in Shanghai to win the match 6–7, 6–4, 7–6 after more than two hours and a half of play.

=== Day 2 ===
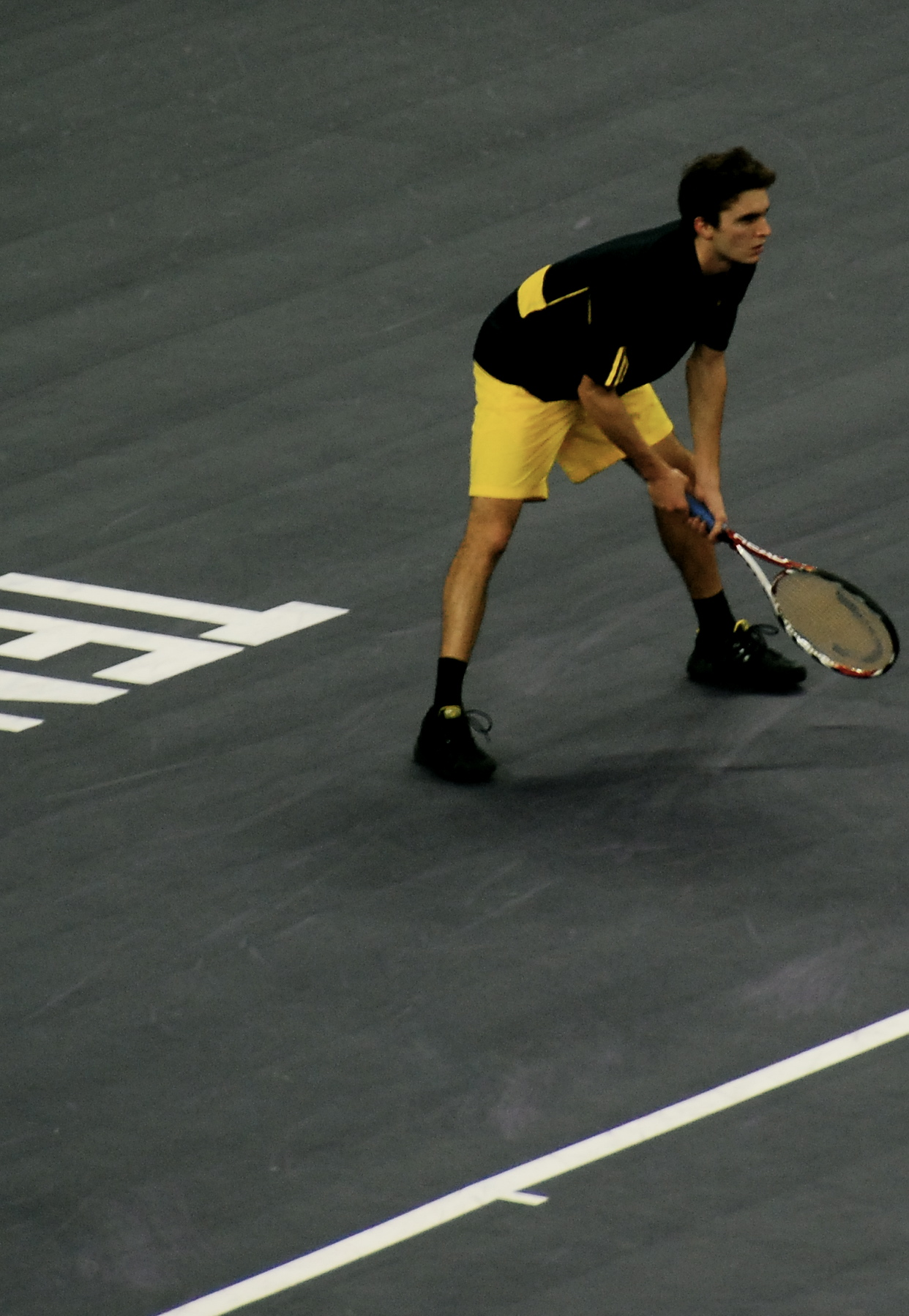
Gilles Simon beat Federer for the second time in two career meetings

In the doubles event, on November 10, second-seeded Daniel Nestor and Nenad Zimonjić faced Erlich and Ram's replacements Mariusz Fyrstenberg and Marcin Matkowski in the first doubles match of the day. The Canadian-Serbian pair edged a close win over the Poles to improve their head-to-head against them to 3–2 (2–2 in 2008). Nestor and Zimonjić faced strong competition in the first set, snatching a 7–4 victory in the tie-break, before Fyrstenberg and Matkowski levelled the score to one-set-all winning the second set 7–5, forcing the encounter into a match tie-break, in which Nestor and Zimonjić proved stronger, eventually claiming a 7–6, 5–7, [10–4] victory, in little less than two hours. The second match of the day, a first career meeting between Jonas Björkman, in his last appearance on the tour –his seventh at the year-end event, having won in 1994 and 2006– and Kevin Ullyett, and Lukáš Dlouhý and Leander Paes, turned out an easier task for the veteran Björkman and partner Ullyett, as they lost merely ten points on their serve, and converted all their break opportunities, to win 6–3, 7–5, in just more than one hour.

The first of the two singles matches, both from the Red Group, saw Nadal's replacement Gilles Simon take on top seed Roger Federer, to record his second straight win against the Swiss in two career meetings. Federer took the first opportunity, breaking the Frenchman to lead 3–2 and win the set 6–4. The Swiss continued his domination early in the second set, breaking to 2–1, before Simon broke back to even the score. Both players held their serve until the last game, when the Frenchman, taking advantage of Federer's repeated forehand errors, broke to a 6–4 victory. Federer's errors kept on going, as Simon tightened his game, breaking the Swiss one more time, and clinching a 4–6, 6–4, 6–3 comeback victory, repeat of his first Toronto Masters win over Federer. The loss was Federer's fourth in his seven-year, thirty-matches Masters Cup history, and marked the second time he started the tournament with a round robin loss, after his defeat by Fernando González in 2007. The second match was set to be the first complete encounter of Andy Murray and Andy Roddick since a Memphis semifinal (won by Roddick), after a Miami Masters quarterfinal (Roddick retired) and a Queen's Club quarterfinal (Murray withdrew). In Shanghai, Murray converted his first break opportunities to win the first set 6–4. Roddick struck back in the second set, dominating the game to a 5–0 lead, closing on the set 6–1. The final set followed exactly the same pattern, with Murray taking the lead this time, to claim victory on the score of 6–4, 1–6, 6–1.

=== Day 3 ===
In the doubles' Red Group matches, on November 11, Pablo Cuevas and Luis Horna recorded their first Masters Cup win, and their second hard court win together, against South Africans Jeff Coetzee and Wesley Moodie, in the two teams' first ever meeting. Despite being broken once, the South American French Open champions dominated the first set, breaking three times themselves to win it 6–2. Both pairs held their serve in the second set, with Coetzee and Moodie taking the tie-break 7–2. The eighth seeds eventually claimed victory after clinching a close match tie-break, on the final score of 6–2, 6–7, [11–9], eliminating Coetzee and Moodie from the tournament. In the other encounter of the day, Bob and Mike Bryan scored their second victory in the round robin, defeating Mahesh Bhupathi and Mark Knowles for the third straight time in four meetings in 2008. The Americans snatched the first set 7–5 with a late break, before their opponents took the second set, breaking the Bryans twice to a 6–3 victory. As they did in their first round robin match, Bob and Mike Bryan edged out in the match tie-break, to finally score a 5–7, 6–4, [10–4] victory, and qualify for the semifinals.

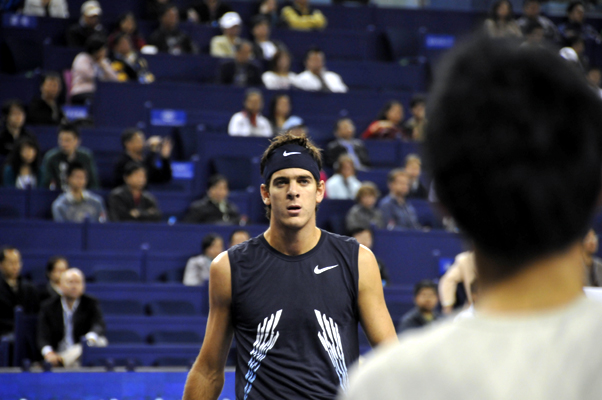
Juan Martín del Potro decided to compete despite a toe injury contracted in Tokyo

The second series of two Gold Group matches took place, with Juan Martín del Potro coming out on top for the second time in two meetings with Jo-Wilfried Tsonga 7–6, 7–6. Both players broke their opponent's serve several times, despite the tie-breaks finishes, with del Potro taking the advantage in the first game, and Tsonga immediately breaking back to 2–2, to see the set end in a deciding tie-break the Argentinian took, on an unforced error by his adversary. The second set took the same start as the first, with a break by del Potro, this time held to a 5–4 advantage, when Tsonga once again broke back, forcing another tie-break. Del Potro was once more victorious in the set decider, to clinch his first Masters Cup victory. The match between the first day's winners, Nikolay Davydenko and Novak Djokovic, was their second meeting, after a Davis Cup first round encounter in which Djokovic retired, handing Russia a decisive victory. Davydenko broke in the first service game, holding his advantage until serving at 5–3. Djokovic then broke back, and the set went into a tie-break, which he won, as Davydenko's error count went up during the set decider. The Russian started a comeback, lining up seven straight games to win the second set with a bagel, and lead 1–0 in the third. Djokovic then saved two breaks points, and converted one at 5–5, with Davydenko's unforced errors giving him the break, and eventually the match, on the score of 7–6, 0–6, 7–5. The win meant Tsonga's elimination, and Djokovic's qualification for the semifinals.

=== Day 4 ===
Two more matches of the doubles' Gold Group took place on November 12, with second-seeded Daniel Nestor and Nenad Zimonjić, vying for the year-end No. 1 spot, defeating in straight sets Jonas Björkman and Kevin Ullyett. The Canadian-Serbian team breezed by their opponents, saving all breaks points Björkman and Ullyett held against them, and breaking three times (twice in the first set and once in the second), to score a 6–1, 6–4 victory, the second career win over Björkman and Ullyett, following a close final at the Wimbledon Championships. In the second match, Lukáš Dlouhý and Leander Paes faced Mariusz Fyrstenberg and Marcin Matkowski for the first time, with the Poles taking the close match in straight sets 7–6, 6–3. Neither team converted their break opportunities in the first set, before Fyrstenberg and Matkowski took the advantage in the tie-break, winning it 7–2. The second set was more competitive, as Dlouhý and Paes managed to score one break, but their opponents scored three, to eventually claim victory after less than two-hours-and-a-half. The results of the day assured Nestor and Zimonjić of a semifinal spot, and Dlouhý and Paes of the fourth place of the group.

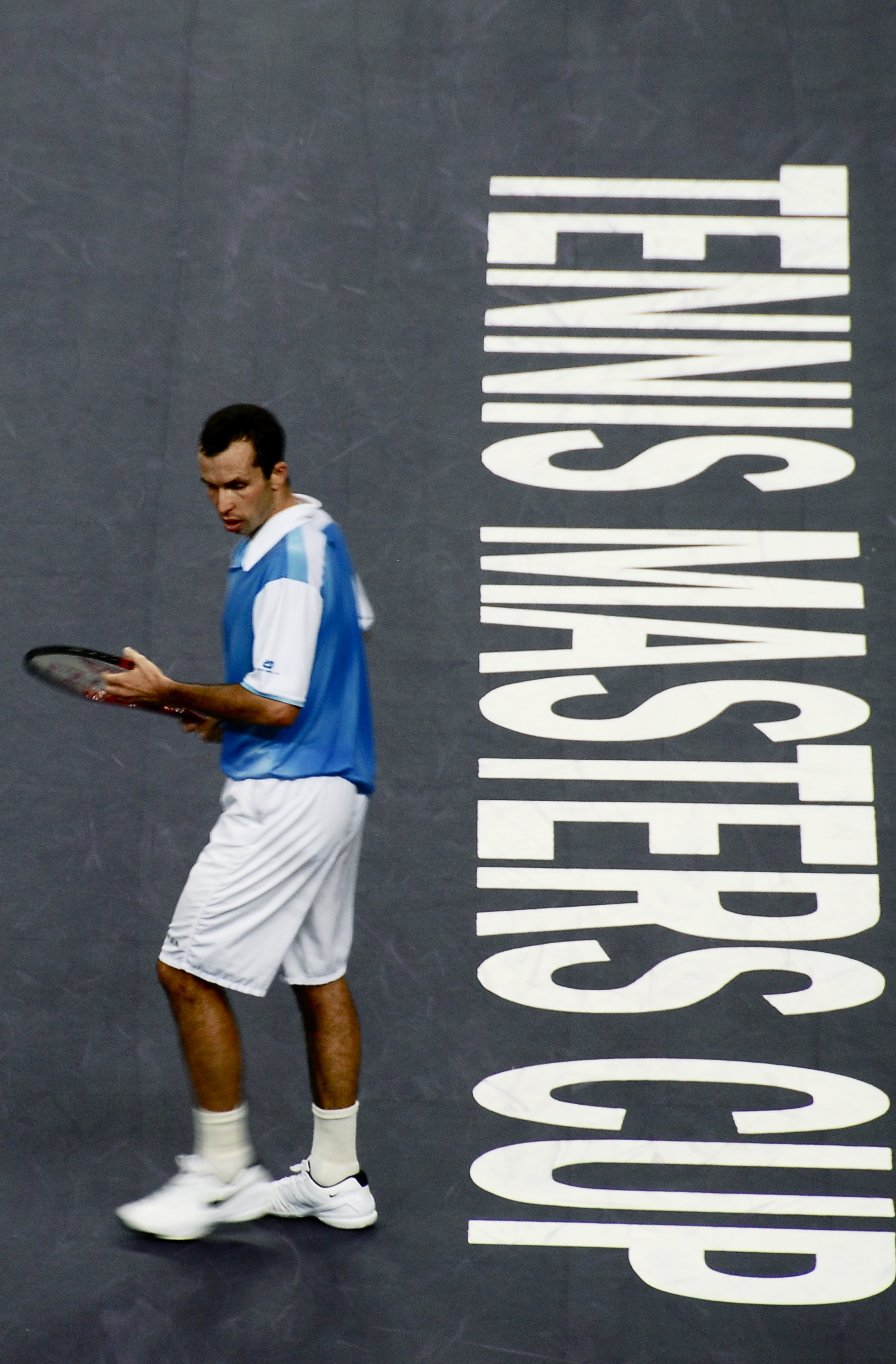
Radek Štěpánek lost his chances to advance by losing to Federer

The fourth day of the competition had started earlier with another withdrawal, as fifth seed and 2007 Masters Cup semifinalist Andy Roddick announced he was pulling out of the event, after injuring his ankle during a practice session on the previous day. "Yesterday in the warm-up during practice I just went over on it. [...] We tried the best we could to get it better but I can't really stop and start on it very quickly." commented Roddick. The American's withdrawal allowed 26th-ranked Radek Štěpánek, who accepted the invitation to Shanghai as first alternate, after sixteen players ranked above him, and below last qualifier Gilles Simon, refused to come to the Masters Cup. Roddick said he had called Štěpánek, before deciding not to play, to tell him he might enter the competition : "I called Štěpánek earlier today to let him know where my head was at, and then just told him when I came off the practice court. So he knew as early as anybody else." Štěpánek's unexpected appearance (Murray had commented "Štěpánek's turned up without his own racquets, he borrowed some socks off me earlier and he hasn't got his contact lenses either") marked the Czech's first career participation to the year-end championships.

The third match of the Red Group, in the singles event, was a repeat of the Madrid Masters final which Andy Murray had won over Gilles Simon in straight sets less than a month earlier. The World No. 4 made the strongest start of the match, quickly racing to a 4–0 lead. The Frenchman then fought back to 4–3, but failed to break Murray a second time, letting the Scot use his advantage to win the set 6–4. The second set was a formality for Murray, who saved all three break points he had against him, and took Simon's serve twice to record his second round robin win, 6–4, 6–2, after one-hour and a half of play. The unexpected line up of the second match of the day opposed top Roger Federer to Roddick's replacement, ninth-seeded Radek Štěpánek, for the fourth time in the year, after a Rome quarterfinal (won by Štěpánek), a US Open third round (won by Federer), and a Madrid second round (won by Federer). The Swiss broke in the opening game of the match, and led 2–1 when Štěpánek broke back to 2–2. Both players held their serve to a tie-break Federer eventually took 7–4, capitalizing on Štěpánek's unforced errors. Federer and Štěpánek continued to serve strongly in the second set, before the Swiss took the advantage at 4–3, to lead 5–3 and serve for the set. Štěpánek managed to break back one last time, but Federer took the Czech's serve again to close the match 7–6, 6–4, in less than two hours, already crushing Štěpánek's slim chances to leave the round robin, and allowing Murray to secure a semifinal berth.

=== Day 5 ===
The final matches of the doubles' Red Group, on November 13, opposed, in a dead rubber, top-seeded Bob and Mike Bryan, already qualified for the semifinals, and Jeff Coetzee and Wesley Moodie, already assured of ending fourth of the group. The two first sets went on similarly, with the South Africans breaking twice in the first to win it 6–2, and the Americans doing the same in the second to level the score. Coetzee and Moodie managed to take the close deciding tie-break, improving their head-to-head against the Bryans to 2–2 by scoring a 6–2, 2–6, [12–10], victory over them. The second, crucial match, for a semifinal spot, saw Pablo Cuevas and Luis Horna face for the first time Mark Knowles (defending champion) and Mahesh Bhupathi (three-time runner-up). Both teams served strongly, converting none of their breaks points in the first set, and providing none in the second. Bhupathi and Knowles took the first tie-break 7–3, Cuevas and Horna the second 7–4, before the latter extended their second set domination to a 6–7, 7–6, [10–5] victory, eliminating Bhupathi and Knowles, and setting a semifinal clash with Nestor and Zimonjić –which they had beaten in the French Open final.

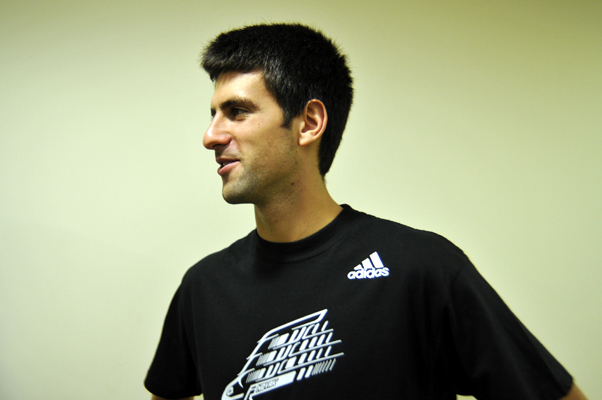
Novak Djokovic was defeated for the third straight time by Tsonga

The last two matches of the singles' Gold Group took place, with the first, also a dead rubber, opposing Novak Djokovic (already qualified) to Jo-Wilfried Tsonga (already eliminated) for the third time since the Serb won their Australian Open final. Djokovic easily raced through the first set, breaking Tsonga twice to a 6–1 win. The second set was closer, as both players were holding their service games until 5–6, when Djokovic, serving for a tie-break, found himself led, then broken by Tsonga, who levelled the match to one-set-all. In the final set, Tsonga increased his game level breaking Djokovic twice to win the last set, ending the match on the score of 1–6, 7–5, 6–1, to improve his head-to-head record against the Serb to 3–1, and score his first career Masters Cup win. The second match, set to decide of the third semifinalist after Djokovic and Murray, was the third career meeting of Nikolay Davydenko and Juan Martín del Potro. The Russian broke del Potro early in the first set, leading 4–1 at a point, when the Argentinian took back Davydenko's serve, seemingly getting back into the match. The fourth seed, though, did not let del Potro complete his comeback, and broke him again, eventually taking the set 6–4. Davydenko's momentum took him through the second set, where he converted each of the two break points obtained, to close the match 6–4, 6–2 after less than an-hour and a half of play. The result eliminated del Potro, and allowed Davydenko to qualify for his second semifinal in four season-ending events appearances, after 2005.

=== Day 6 ===
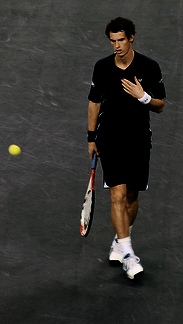
Andy Murray won all his round robin matches, before losing in the semifinals

In the first of the last two doubles round robin matches, within the Gold Group, on November 14, Daniel Nestor and Nenad Zimonjić, already qualified to meet Cuevas and Horna in the semifinals, faced already eliminated Lukáš Dlouhý and Leander Paes, in a dead rubber. The second seeds did not leave many opportunities to the US Open runners-up Dlouhý and Paes, breaking them twice in the first, and once in the second set, saving all break points against themselves, to cruise to a 6–1, 6–4 win, and leave the round-robin stage as the only undefeated team. In the second match –to decide of the last doubles qualifiers–, Mariusz Fyrstenberg and Marcin Matkowski defeated Jonas Björkman and Kevin Ullyett, to enter the last four, setting a semifinal meeting with Bob and Mike Bryan. The first two sets were each dominated by one of the teams, with the Poles breaking twice to win the first, and Björkman and Ullyett doing the same to win the second, before Fyrstenberg and Matkowski eventually took the advantage in the deciding match tie-break, to score a 6–2, 1–6, [10–6] victory, and complete the semifinals line up.

Björkman and Ullyett's loss to Fyrstenberg and Matkowski marked the last career match of the Swede Jonas Björkman, who had announced his retirement at the end of the year, after a seventeen-year career, started in 1991, at the Swedish Open in Båstad. In singles, Björkman won six career titles, and went as high as the 4th place in the rankings, in 1997, reaching two Grand Slam semifinals at the 1997 US Open (lost to Rusedski), and at the 2006 Wimbledon Championships (lost to Federer). A former World No. 1 in doubles, Björkman won fifty-four career doubles titles, including nine Grand Slam crowns (runner-up at six more). He was one of four active doubles players at the time of the Masters Cup to have completed a career Grand Slam (with Bob and Mike Bryan, and Daniel Nestor), and two year-end championships titles, in 1994 and 2006. Björkman, who mainly partnered during his career with Jan Apell, Nicklas Kulti, Todd Woodbridge, Max Mirnyi and Kevin Ullyett, also finished runner-up at two mixed doubles Grand Slam finals at Wimbledon, with Anna Kournikova in 1999, and Alicia Molik in 2007, and was part of the Sweden Davis Cup team for their last three championships in 1994, 1997 and 1998. Upon retirement, as a ceremony was taking place for him, following his loss to Fyrstenberg and Matkowski, Björkman declared: "We were hoping to maybe get through [to the semifinals]. I still think it's great to end my career in the biggest event of the year. But you can't get everything. I've been mentally prepared for this because I'm mentally very ready to retire. [...] I've been very fortunate to be able to play for so long. It started as my hobby, and I've been able to do it for seventeen years, which is great. I'm really looking forward for the next step in life."

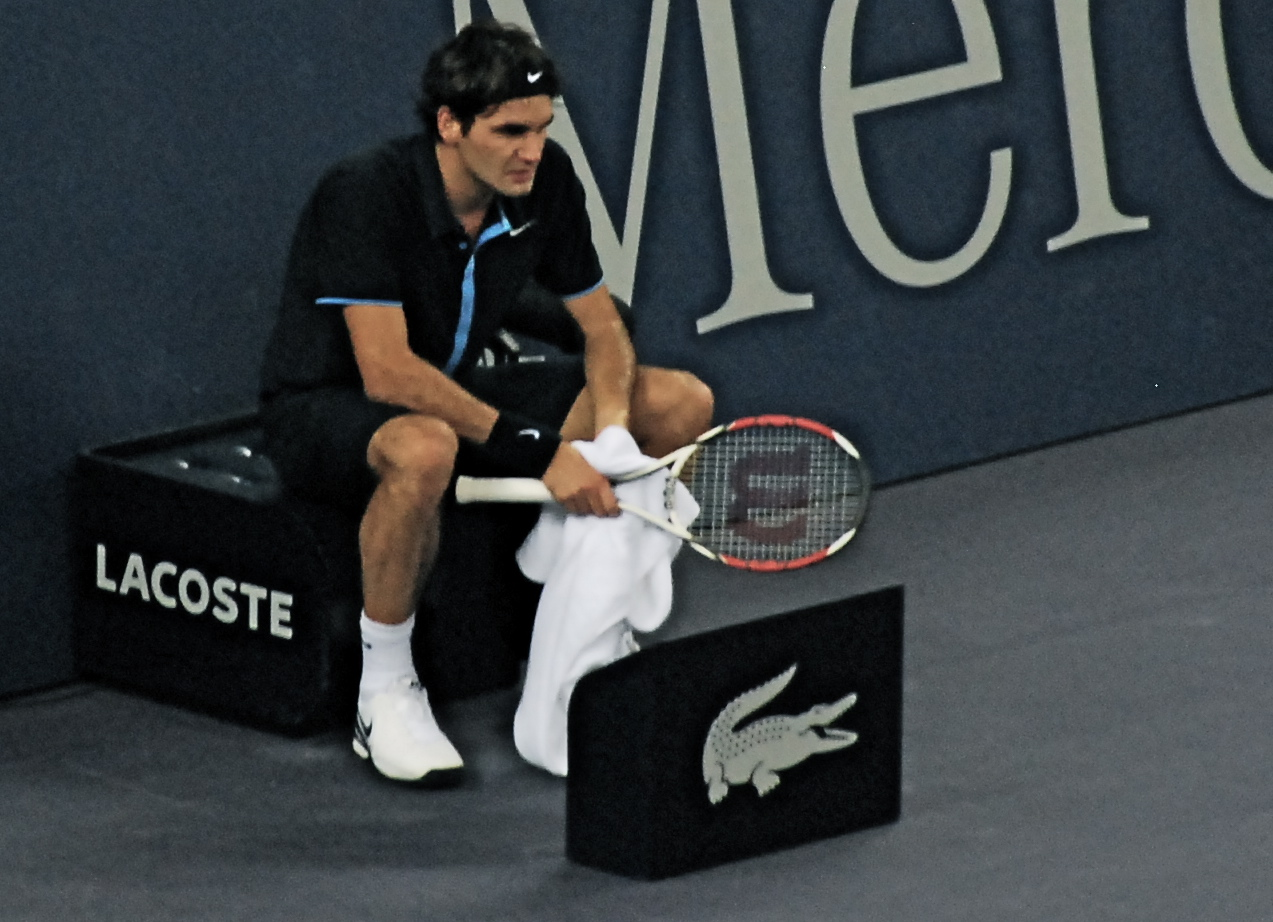
Roger Federer went out in the round robin for the first time of his career

The final round robin matches first opposed, in singles, Gilles Simon to Radek Štěpánek. Despite them having nothing to gain from a win (Štěpánek was already eliminated, and only the last match would determine Simon's fate), the Frenchman took the opportunity to avenge a French Open first round loss to the Czech, breaking him twice in the first set, once in the second, to clinch a 6–1, 6–4 victory. Andy Murray then faced Roger Federer in a match to decide of the Red Group's standings –a Murray win giving him the first place, Simon the second, a Federer win making him first, Murray second. Federer first took Murray's serve to lead 3–1, but the Briton broke back, and it took a second break by the Swiss at 5–4 to take the set. Murray was quick, with two breaks of serve, to race to a 5–2 second set lead, and was serving when Federer lined up four games to get back into the set, forcing a tie-break –which Murray eventually won, 7–3. Murray seemed to have grasp of the match at 3–0 in the third, with Federer, already diminished by an illness, calling the trainer for the back injury that had forced him out from the Paris Masters, but the Swiss fought back again, winning four straight games to lead 4–3. Unable to retain his advantage, Federer found himself led 4–5, saving seven match points on his ten-deuce-serve, before being broken, at 5–6, allowing Murray to reach the semis (vs. Davydenko) undefeated, with a 4–6, 7–6, 7–5 win, and giving Simon a semifinal spot (vs. Djokovic). Federer made his earliest exit to the tournament since 2002, when he went out in the semifinals (lost to Hewitt).

=== Day 7 ===
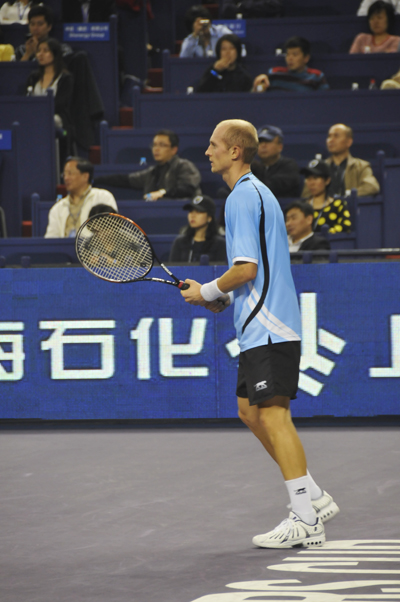
Nikolay Davydenko was the second Russian after Kafelnikov to reach the final of the year-end championships –and lose

The semifinals of the Masters Cup, now in a knockout stage, took place on November 15, first opposing doubles Gold Group winners, ATP No. 2 Daniel Nestor (2007 champion, 1998 and 2006 runner-up) and Nenad Zimonjić (2005 finalist), undefeated in the event, to Red Group seconds Pablo Cuevas and Luis Horna (in their first year-end event appearance). The two teams had only met once before this match, in the French Open final, where the South Americans had upset the Canadian-Serbian pair, defeating them 6–2, 6–3 in less than an hour to win their first Grand Slam title. Nestor and Zimonjić eased through the Roland-Garros rematch, providing no break opportunities on their serve, but taking their opponents' four times, to score a 6–1, 6–3 victory in less than an hour and a half, and qualify for their first final together. Red Group top pair and current World No. 1 Bob Bryan and Mike Bryan next faced Gold Group seconds, Erlich and Ram's substitutes Mariusz Fyrstenberg and Marcin Matkowski. The semifinal was preceded by a five-match history, with the Bryans leading the head-to-head 4–1, having played in 2004 in Acapulco (won by Bryan/Bryan), in 2007 in Madrid (won by Bryan/Bryan), and in 2008 in Barcelona (won by Bryan/Bryan), Cincinnati (won by Bryan/Bryan), and Paris (won by Fyrstenberg/Matkowski). Bob and Mike Bryan dominated the encounter, serving strongly throughout the meeting, and breaking once in each set, to clinch, after little more than an hour, a 6–4, 6–4 victory, and reach their third final at the year-end event after winning their two previous ones in 2003 and 2004. Qualifying for the final, Nestor and Zimonjić, and Bob and Mike Bryan, separated by a mere sixty-three points in the Race rankings, set a match to decide of the year-end No. 1 spot.

The singles semifinals saw first facing Novak Djokovic and Gilles Simon, both in their first semifinal appearances at the year-end event. The two's only previous meeting was then a second round in Marseille, in Djokovic's first tournament after his Australian Open win, where the Frenchman had taken the advantage in three sets 6–2, 6–7, 6–3. Simon was once again the first to take the lead in their second encounter, in Shanghai, returning and serving slightly better than his opponent, to snatch the first set 6–4. After calling the trainer to nurse a neck pain at the start of the second set, Simon failed to hold his serve to be led 1–3 by the Serb, who then maintained his break to the end of the 6–3 set. Djokovic took the chance to break at 1–1 in the third, leading 5–4, when, after taking a time out for cramp, the Serb served for the match, and Simon managed to break back to 5–5. The fatigue of the nearly three hours match, though, proved too strong for the Frenchman, who lost his serve at 6–5, allowing Djokovic to finish the match on the score of 4–6, 6–3, 7–5, and reach his first year-end championships final. Andy Murray, victor of Federer in a three-hours match on the previous day, faced Nikolay Davydenko, in his second semifinal showing at the Masters Cup, after 2005, when he lost to David Nalbandian in straight sets. The Murray-Davydenko match was preceded by six previous meetings, split between the two players, in 2006 in Indian Wells (won by Davydenko) and at the US Open (won by Davydenko), in 2007 in Doha (won by Murray) and Indian Wells (won by Murray), and in 2008 in Doha (won by Murray) and Dubai (won by Davydenko). Davydenko broke in the first game, only to be immediately broken back by Murray, but the Russian, who had not played since his last round robin match two days before, proved himself fresher in the course of the game, and was able to take Murray's serve a second time at 5–5, keeping his following service game to score a 7–5 win in the first set. Davydenko capitalized on his momentum to line up five straight games in the second set from 1–2 to 6–2, clinching his 7–5, 6–2 win over Murray in little more than an hour and a half, to reach his fifth final of the season, and his first at the Masters Cup.

=== Day 8 ===
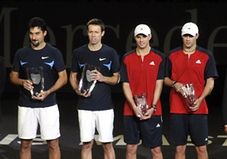
Zimonjić and Nestor edged out Bob and Mike Bryan to clinch the year-end No. 1 spot

The first final to take place on November 16, was that of the doubles event, taking place between World No. 1s, US Open, Miami, Rome and Cincinnati Masters, Barcelona champion Bob Bryan and Mike Bryan, and World No. 2s, Wimbledon, Hamburg and Toronto Masters, London Queen's Club titlists Daniel Nestor and Nenad Zimonjić, in a match to decide of the year-end No. 1 ranking. It was the third year-end event final of the Bryans, after 2003 (def. Llodra/Santoro) and 2004 (def. Black/Ullyett), the fourth of Daniel Nestor, after three finals with Mark Knowles, in 1998 (lost to Eltingh/Haarhuis), 2006 (lost to Björkman/Mirnyi), and 2007 (def. Aspelin/Knowle), and the second of Nenad Zimonjić after a previous final in 2005 with Leander Paes (lost to Llodra/Santoro). The two teams also shared a four-match history before the final, having played together in four ATP Masters Series finals, in 2007 in Paris (won by Bryan/Bryan), and in 2008 in Rome (won by Bryan/Bryan), Hamburg (won by Nestor/Zimonjić), Toronto (won by Nestor/Zimonjić). The Canadian-Serbian duo took the upper hand early in the match, breaking the Americans to lead in the first set, until the Bryans broke back to level the score –both teams then held their serve to a tie-break, in which Nestor and Zimonjić prevailed, 7–3. The second seeds raced through the next set, converting their two break points to notch a 7–6, 6–2 win –their fifth title of the year, and their first at the year-end championships. The win also meant a first year-end No. 1 spot together for the undefeated champions Nestor and Zimonjić (Zimonjić's first ever, Nestor's third, after ending No. 1 in 2002 and 2004 with Knowles) and, in the individual rankings for doubles players, the top spot for Zimonjić, and the second for Nestor.

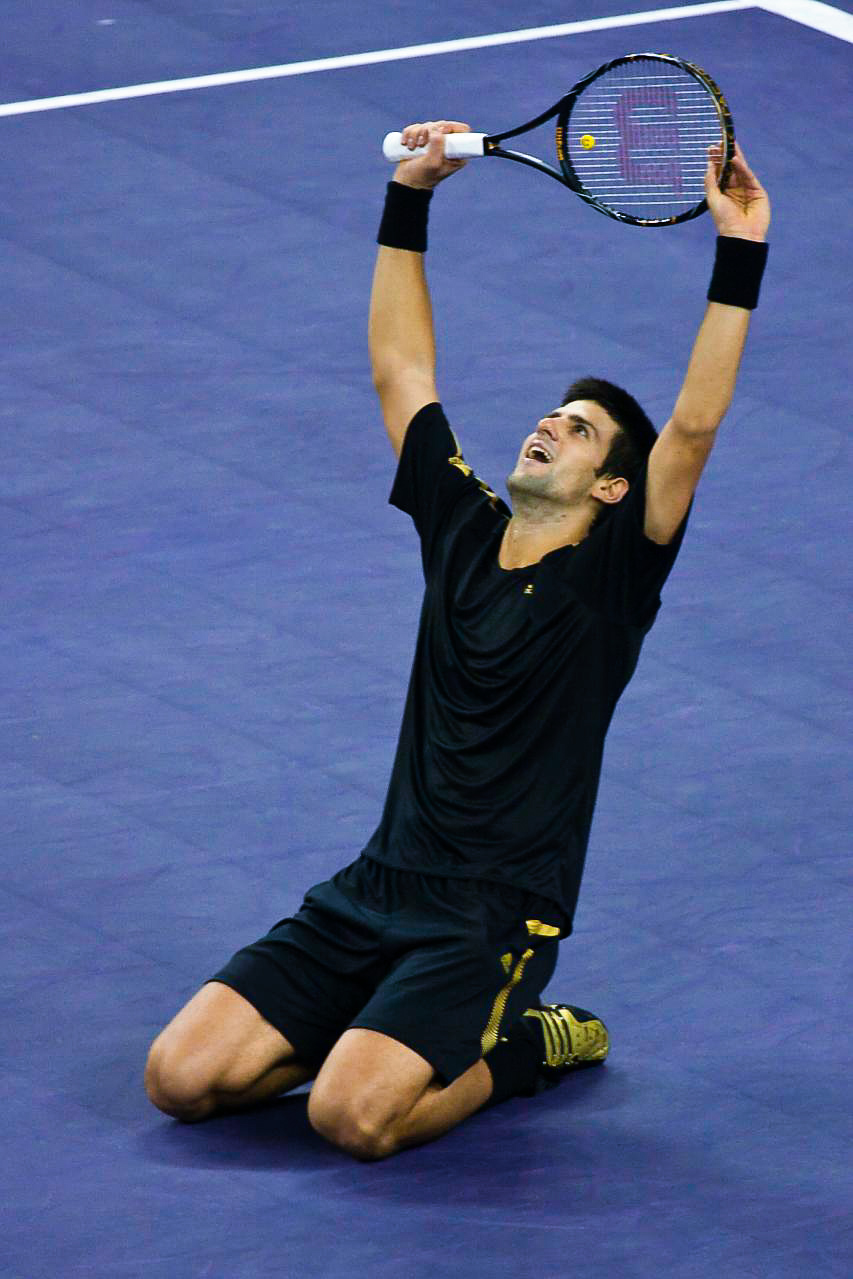
Novak Djokovic became the nineteenth champion in thirty-nine editions

The Tennis Masters Cup singles final featured ATP No. 3, Australian Open, Indian Wells and Rome champion Novak Djokovic, and Miami Masters, Pörtschach and Warsaw winner Nikolay Davydenko, in both men's first year-end championships final. The encounter was the third match of the two, after a Davis Cup rubber won by Davydenko after Djokovic retired, leading two sets to one, and their round robin meeting on day 3, in which Djokovic prevailed 7–6, 0–6, 7–5. Djokovic started the encounter on serve, and took the advantage of a weak Davydenko service game (the Russian went on to win only 42% of his service points in the set) to break and lead 2–0. A nervous Davydenko failed again to keep his serve at 3–0, and was broken again by the Serb. The Russian managed to save his service game at 5–0, forcing Djokovic to serve for the set. The Serb did not falter, and clinched the set 6–1. Despite holding his first service game, Davydenko was broken again at 1–1 in the second set. Davydenko avoided another break of serve when led 1–3, but was unable to gain the advantage on Djokovic's serve until the Serb served for the match at 5–4. Davydenko then increased his level of play, and came back to 5-all, but Djokovic, keeping his momentum of the match, broke once more, and held to serve to claim victory, after one hour and forty-two minutes, on the final score of 6–1, 7–5. The win marked Djokovic's fourth title of the year (after a six months title drought since Rome, won on May 11) and his eleventh overall, as well as his first year-end championships crown. Djokovic became the first Serbian player to win the singles championships (Nenad Zimonjić had become the first Serbian to win the doubles championships just hours before – and all three men, Djokovic, Zimonjić and Nestor were born in Belgrade), succeeding to two-time defending champion Roger Federer, and, thanks to the win, and Federer's early loss, finished the year only two points behind the Swiss in the ATP Race. Djokovic commented on his win : "I would put it in the same league as a Grand Slam because the best eight players in the world are participating here. [...] I feel very happy. End up the season the way I started it, with a win in a big event. So it's a great boost up for upcoming season." On the possibility of going up in the rankings in the 2009 ATP World Tour season, Djokovic admitted again his goal to become World No. 1 : "Certainly, I believe that I have quality to reach the top spot in the upcoming year or, you know, whatever, next couple of years, 10 years [...] That is my lifetime goal that I’ve been always trying to achieve."
