= 2008 Mercedes Cup – Doubles =

Doubles
- 2008 Mercedes Cup

Final
- Champion: (Germany) Christopher Kas (Germany) Philipp Kohlschreiber
- Runner-up: (Germany) Michael Berrer (Germany) Mischa Zverev
- Score: 6–3, 6–4

Details
- Draw: 16
- Seeds: 4

Events
Singles	Doubles
- Stuttgart Open

František Čermák and Leoš Friedl were the defending champions, but chose not to participate that year.

Christopher Kas and Philipp Kohlschreiber won in the final 6–3, 6–4, against Michael Berrer and Mischa Zverev.

== Seeds ==
1. (Poland) Mariusz Fyrstenberg / (Poland) Marcin Matkowski (quarterfinals)
2. (Austria) Julian Knowle / (Austria) Jürgen Melzer (first round)
3. (Austria) Oliver Marach / (Slovakia) Michal Mertiňák (first round)
4. (Germany) Christopher Kas / (Germany) Philipp Kohlschreiber (champions)

== Draw ==
Key

- Q = Qualifier
- WC = Wild card
- LL = Lucky loser
- Alt = Alternate
- ITF = ITF entry
- PR = Protected ranking
- SR = Special ranking
- SE = Special exempt
- JE = Junior exempt
- JR = Junior Accelerator Programme entrant
- CO = College Accelerator Programme entrant
- NG = Next Gen Accelerator Program entrant
- w/o = Walkover
- r = Retired
- d = Defaulted

=== Draw ===
First round
1	(Poland) M Fyrstenberg (Poland) M Matkowski	6	6
WC	(Germany) M Bachinger (Germany) D Brands	4	2
(Spain) Montañés (Spain) S Ventura
WC	(Germany) A Beck (Austria) M Fischer	w/o
4	(Germany) C Kas (Germany) P Kohlschreiber	w/o
(Spain) N Almagro (Spain) O Hernández
(Argentina) L Arnold Ker (Argentina) A Calleri	6^{4}	6	[10]
(Argentina) M Hood (Netherlands) R Wassen	7	4	5
(Argentina) J Acasuso (Argentina) S Prieto	4	3
(Germany) D Gremelmayr (Germany) M Kohlmann	6	6
(Argentina) JM del Potro (Argentina) E Schwank	6	6
3	(Austria) O Marach (Slovakia) M Mertiňák	2	4
(Australia) S Huss (United Kingdom) R Hutchins	2	7	[6]
(Germany) M Berrer (Germany) M Zverev	6	6^{2}	[10]
(Argentina) C Berlocq (Uruguay) P Cuevas	6	6
2	(Austria) J Knowle (Austria) J Melzer	4	4

Quarterfinals
1	(Poland) M Fyrstenberg (Poland) M Matkowski	3	6	[9]
WC	(Germany) A Beck (Austria) M Fischer	6	3	[11]
4	(Germany) C Kas (Germany) P Kohlschreiber	6	6
(Argentina) L Arnold Ker (Argentina) A Calleri	1	2
(Germany) D Gremelmayr (Germany) M Kohlmann	3	7	[3]
(Argentina) JM del Potro (Argentina) E Schwank	6	6^{4}	[10]
(Germany) M Berrer (Germany) M Zverev	6	6
(Argentina) C Berlocq (Uruguay) P Cuevas	3	2

Semifinals
WC	(Germany) A Beck (Austria) M Fischer	4	2
4	(Germany) C Kas (Germany) P Kohlschreiber	6	6
(Argentina) JM del Potro (Argentina) E Schwank
(Germany) M Berrer (Germany) M Zverev	w/o

Final
4	(Germany) C Kas (Germany) P Kohlschreiber	6	6
(Germany) M Berrer (Germany) M Zverev	3	4
