= 2008 Mercedes Cup – Singles =

Singles
- 2008 Mercedes Cup

Final
- Champion: (Argentina) Juan Martín del Potro
- Runner-up: (France) Richard Gasquet
- Score: 6–4, 7–5

Details
- Draw: 28 (4Q / 3WC)
- Seeds: 8

Events
Singles	Doubles
← 2007 ·	Stuttgart Open	· 2009 →

Rafael Nadal was the defending champion, but was forced to withdraw due to a knee injury.

Unseeded Juan Martín del Potro won in the final 6–4, 7–5, against second-seeded Richard Gasquet.

== Seeds ==
The top four seeds receive a bye into the second round.

1. (Spain) Rafael Nadal (withdrew due to a knee injury)
2. (France) Richard Gasquet (final)
3. (Spain) Nicolás Almagro (second round)
4. (Germany) Philipp Kohlschreiber (quarterfinals)
5. (Italy) Simone Bolelli (second round)
6. (Argentina) Agustín Calleri (semifinals)
7. (Argentina) José Acasuso (first round)
8. (Argentina) Eduardo Schwank (semifinals)

== Draw ==
=== Key ===
- Q = Qualifier
- WC = Wild card
- LL = Lucky loser
- Alt = Alternate
- ITF = ITF entry
- PR = Protected ranking
- SR = Special ranking
- SE = Special exempt
- JE = Junior exempt
- JR = Junior Accelerator Programme entrant
- CO = College Accelerator Programme entrant
- NG = Next Gen Accelerator Program entrant
- w/o = Walkover
- r = Retired
- d = Defaulted

=== Finals ===
Semifinals
8	(Argentina) Eduardo Schwank	2	4
(Argentina) Juan Martín del Potro	6	6
6	(Argentina) Agustín Calleri	7	2	3
2	(France) Richard Gasquet	6^{3}	6	6

Final
(Argentina) Juan Martín del Potro	6	7
2	(France) Richard Gasquet	4	5

=== Top half ===
First round
(Argentina) B Dabul	6	5	6
(Germany) D Gremelmayr	3	7	3
WC	(Germany) D Brands	6	3	4
WC	(Germany) A Beck	3	6	6
WC	(Argentina) G Coria	6	1	2
8	(Argentina) E Schwank	0	6	6
(Argentina) C Berlocq	6	5	3
Q	(Kazakhstan) Y Schukin	4	7	6
(Russia) E Korolev	3	5
(Argentina) JM del Potro	6	7
(Germany) M Zverev	7	4	2
5	(Italy) S Bolelli	6^{6}	6	6

Second round
LL	(Czech Republic) J Hernych	7	0	7
(Argentina) B Dabul	6^{5}	6	6^{5}
WC	(Germany) A Beck	6^{5}	2
8	(Argentina) E Schwank	7	6
4	(Germany) P Kohlschreiber	6	6
Q	(Kazakhstan) Y Schukin	3	3
(Argentina) JM del Potro	6	3	6
5	(Italy) S Bolelli	3	6	3

Quarterfinals
LL	(Czech Republic) J Hernych	0	6	3
8	(Argentina) E Schwank	6	4	6
4	(Germany) P Kohlschreiber	6^{3}	3
(Argentina) JM del Potro	7	6

Semifinals
8	(Argentina) E Schwank	2	4
(Argentina) JM del Potro	6	6

=== Bottom half ===
First round
6	(Argentina) A Calleri	7	6
(Austria) J Melzer	6^{3}	4
Q	(Colombia) S Giraldo	6	4	6^{11}
(Uruguay) P Cuevas	4	6	7
(Germany) M Berrer	6	6
(France) É Prodon	3	4
7	(Argentina) J Acasuso	3	6^{5}
(Spain) Montañés	6	7
(Spain) S Ventura	1	4
(Spain) Ó Hernández	6	6
Q	(Czech Republic) L Rosol	6	6
Q	(Austria) M Fischer	2	4

Second round
6	(Argentina) A Calleri	5	7	6
(Uruguay) P Cuevas	7	5	1
(Germany) M Berrer	7	0
3	(Spain) N Almagro	5	0	r
(Spain) Montañés	7	6
(Spain) Ó Hernández	6^{4}	4
Q	(Czech Republic) L Rosol	7	2	2
2	(France) R Gasquet	6^{7}	6	6

Quarterfinals
6	(Argentina) A Calleri	6	6
(Germany) M Berrer	4	2
(Spain) Montañés	3	6^{5}
2	(France) R Gasquet	6	7

Semifinals
6	(Argentina) A Calleri	7	2	3
2	(France) R Gasquet	6^{3}	6	6
