= 2008 Tennis Masters Cup – Singles =

Singles
- 2008 Tennis Masters Cup

Final
- Champion: (Serbia) Novak Djokovic
- Runner-up: (Russia) Nikolay Davydenko
- Score: 6–1, 7–5

Events
Singles	Doubles
← 2007 ·	ATP Finals	· 2009 →

Novak Djokovic defeated Nikolay Davydenko in the final, 6–1, 7–5 to win the singles tennis title at the 2008 Tennis Masters Cup. It was his first Tour Finals title, and the first of an eventual record seven such titles.

Roger Federer was the two-time defending champion, but was eliminated in the round-robin stage. This marked the only time in his career that he was eliminated before the semifinals.

Future champion Andy Murray made his tournament debut; he was defeated by Davydenko in the semifinals. Jo-Wilfried Tsonga, Juan Martín del Potro, Gilles Simon, and Radek Štěpánek (as an alternate who replaced Andy Roddick) also made their tournament debuts. Štěpánek, playing as the world No. 27, was the lowest-ranked player ever to compete in the Tour Finals.

Rafael Nadal qualified as the world No. 1, but withdrew before the tournament with a knee injury, where he was replaced by Simon.

This was the first Tour Finals to have a best-of-three title match.

== Seeds ==
1. (Switzerland) Roger Federer (round robin)
2. (Serbia) Novak Djokovic (champion)
3. (United Kingdom) Andy Murray (semifinals)
4. (Russia) Nikolay Davydenko (final)
5. (United States) Andy Roddick (round robin, withdrew due to a right ankle injury)
6. (France) Jo-Wilfried Tsonga (round robin)
7. (Argentina) Juan Martín del Potro (round robin)
8. (France) Gilles Simon (semifinals)

== Alternates ==
1. (Czech Republic) Radek Štěpánek (replaced Roddick, round robin)
2. (Germany) Nicolas Kiefer (Did not play)

== Draw ==
=== Key ===
- Q = Qualifier
- WC = Wild card
- LL = Lucky loser
- Alt = Alternate
- ITF = ITF entry
- PR = Protected ranking
- SR = Special ranking
- SE = Special exempt
- JE = Junior exempt
- JR = Junior Accelerator Programme entrant
- CO = College Accelerator Programme entrant
- NG = Next Gen Accelerator Program entrant
- w/o = Walkover
- r = Retired
- d = Defaulted

=== Finals ===
Semifinals
3	(United Kingdom) Andy Murray	5	2
4	(Russia) Nikolay Davydenko	7	6
2	(Serbia) Novak Djokovic	4	6	7
8	(France) Gilles Simon	6	3	5

Final
4	(Russia) Nikolay Davydenko	1	5
2	(Serbia) Novak Djokovic	6	7

=== Red group ===
		(Switzerland) Federer	(United Kingdom) Murray	(United States) Roddick (Czech Republic) Štěpánek	(France) Simon	RR W–L	Set W–L	Game W–L	Standings
1	(Switzerland) Roger Federer		6–4, 6–7^{(3–7)}, 5–7	7–6^{(7–4)}, 6–4 (w/ Štěpánek)	6–4, 4–6, 3–6	1–2	4–4	43–44	3
3	(United Kingdom) Andy Murray	4–6, 7–6^{(7–3)}, 7–5		6–4, 1–6, 6–1 (w/ Roddick)	6–4, 6–2	3–0	6–2	43–34	1
5; 9	(United States) Andy Roddick (Czech Republic) Radek Štěpánek	6–7^{(4–7)}, 4–6 (w/ Štěpánek)	4–6, 6–1, 1–6 (w/ Roddick)		1–6, 4–6 (w/ Štěpánek)	0–1; 0–2	1–2; 0–4	11–13; 15–25	X 4
8	(France) Gilles Simon	4–6, 6–4, 6–3	4–6, 2–6	6–1, 6–4 (w/ Štěpánek)		2–1	4–3	34–30	2

Standings are determined by: 1. number of wins; 2. number of matches; 3. in two-players-ties, head-to-head records; 4. in three-players-ties, percentage of sets won, or of games won; 5. steering-committee decision.

=== Gold group ===
		(Serbia) Djokovic	(Russia) Davydenko	(France) Tsonga	(Argentina) del Potro	RR W–L	Set W–L	Game W–L	Standings
2	(Serbia) Novak Djokovic		7–6^{(7–3)}, 0–6, 7–5	6–1, 5–7, 1–6	7–5, 6–3	2–1	5–3	39–39	1
4	(Russia) Nikolay Davydenko	6–7^{(3–7)}, 6–0, 5–7		6–7^{(6–8)}, 6–4, 7–6^{(7–0)}	6–3, 6–2	2–1	5–3	48–36	2
6	(France) Jo-Wilfried Tsonga	1–6, 7–5, 6–1	7–6^{(8–6)}, 4–6, 6–7^{(0–7)}		6–7^{(4–7)}, 6–7^{(5–7)}	1–2	3–5	43–45	4
7	(Argentina) Juan Martín del Potro	5–7, 3–6	3–6, 2–6	7–6^{(7–4)}, 7–6^{(7–5)}		1–2	2–4	27–37	3

Standings are determined by: 1. number of wins; 2. number of matches; 3. in two-players-ties, head-to-head records; 4. in three-players-ties, percentage of sets won, or of games won; 5. steering-committee decision.

== See also ==
- ATP World Tour Finals appearances
