= 2008 Mercedes Cup =

- Date: 7–13 July
- Edition: 31st
- Category: International Series Gold
- Draw: 28S / 16D
- Prize money: €547,000
- Surface: Clay / Outdoor
- Location: Stuttgart, Germany
- Venue: Tennis Club Weissenhof

Champions

Singles
- (Argentina) Juan Martín del Potro

Doubles
- (Germany) Christopher Kas / (Germany) Philipp Kohlschreiber
← 2007 ·	Stuttgart Open	· 2009 →

The 2008 Mercedes Cup was a men's tennis tournament played on outdoor clay courts. It was the 31st edition of the Mercedes Cup, and was part of the International Series Gold of the 2008 ATP Tour. It took place at the Tennis Club Weissenhof in Stuttgart, Germany, from 7 July until 13 July 2008.

The announced field was headlined by ATP No. 2, Stuttgart defending champion, French Open and new Wimbledon titlist Rafael Nadal, Sydney doubles winner and Queen's Club quarterfinalist Richard Gasquet, and French Open quarterfinalist, Costa do Sauípe and Acapulco champion Nicolás Almagro. Also competing were Auckland titlist Philipp Kohlschreiber, Munich runner-up Simone Bolelli, Agustín Calleri, José Acasuso and Eduardo Schwank.

== Finals ==
=== Singles ===
(Argentina) Juan Martín del Potro defeated (France) Richard Gasquet 6–4, 7–5

- It was Juan Martín del Potro's 1st career title.

=== Doubles ===
(Germany) Christopher Kas / (Germany) Philipp Kohlschreiber defeated (Germany) Michael Berrer / (Germany) Mischa Zverev 6–3, 6–4
