= 2008 Masters Series Hamburg =

- Date: 10–18 May
- Edition: 102nd
- Category: Masters Series
- Draw: 56S/24D
- Prize money: € 2,057,000
- Surface: Clay / outdoor
- Location: Hamburg, Germany
- Venue: Rothenbaum Tennis Center

Champions

Singles
- (Spain) Rafael Nadal

Doubles
- (Canada) Daniel Nestor / (Serbia) Nenad Zimonjić
- Masters Series Hamburg

The 2008 Masters Series Hamburg was a men's tennis tournament played on outdoor clay courts. It was the 102nd edition of the Masters Series Hamburg, and was part of the ATP Masters Series of the 2008 ATP Tour. It took place at the Rothenbaum Tennis Center in Hamburg, Germany, from 10 May through 18 May 2008.

The men's field was headlined by World No. 1 and defending champion Roger Federer, Monte Carlo winner and 2007 Hamburg runner-up Rafael Nadal, and Australian Open and Rome winner Novak Djokovic. Other top seeds competing were Miami champion Nikolay Davydenko, Valencia Open winner David Ferrer, James Blake, Richard Gasquet and Tomáš Berdych.

== Finals ==
=== Singles ===
(Spain) Rafael Nadal defeated (Switzerland) Roger Federer, 7–5, 6–7^{(3–7)}, 6–3

- It was Nadal's 3rd title of the year, and his 26th overall. It was his 2nd Masters title of the year, and his 11th overall.

=== Doubles ===
(Canada) Daniel Nestor / (Serbia) Nenad Zimonjić defeated (United States) Bob Bryan / (United States) Mike Bryan, 6–4, 5–7, [10–8]
