= 2007 Tennis Masters Cup – Singles =

Singles
- 2007 Tennis Masters Cup

Final
- Champion: (Switzerland) Roger Federer
- Runner-up: (Spain) David Ferrer
- Score: 6–2, 6–3, 6–2

Details
- Draw: 8

Events
Singles	Doubles
← 2006 ·	ATP Finals	· 2008 →

Defending champion Roger Federer defeated David Ferrer in the final, 6–2, 6–3, 6–2 to win the singles tennis title at the 2007 Tennis Masters Cup. It was his fourth Tour Finals title.

Future seven-time champion Novak Djokovic and Richard Gasquet made their tournament debuts; both were eliminated in the round-robin stage.

This was the last Tour Finals to have a best-of-five title match.

== Seeds ==
1. (Switzerland) Roger Federer (champion)
2. (Spain) Rafael Nadal (semifinals)
3. (Serbia) Novak Djokovic (round robin)
4. (Russia) Nikolay Davydenko (round robin)
5. (United States) Andy Roddick (semifinals)
6. (Spain) David Ferrer (final)
7. (Chile) Fernando González (round robin)
8. (France) Richard Gasquet (round robin)

== Alternates ==
1. (Spain) Tommy Robredo (Did not play)
2. (Argentina) Juan Ignacio Chela (Did not play)

== Draw ==
=== Key ===
- Q = Qualifier
- WC = Wild card
- LL = Lucky loser
- Alt = Alternate
- ITF = ITF entry
- PR = Protected ranking
- SR = Special ranking
- SE = Special exempt
- JE = Junior exempt
- JR = Junior Accelerator Programme entrant
- CO = College Accelerator Programme entrant
- NG = Next Gen Accelerator Program entrant
- w/o = Walkover
- r = Retired
- d = Defaulted

=== Finals ===
Semifinals
1	(Switzerland) Roger Federer	6	6
2	(Spain) Rafael Nadal	4	1
6	(Spain) David Ferrer	6	6
5	(United States) Andy Roddick	1	3

Final
1	(Switzerland) Roger Federer	6	6	6
6	(Spain) David Ferrer	2	3	2

=== Red group ===
		(Switzerland) Federer	(Russia) Davydenko	(United States) Roddick	(Chile) González	RR W–L	Set W–L	Game W–L	Standings
1	(Switzerland) Roger Federer		6–4, 6–3	6–4, 6–2	6–3, 6–7^{(1–7)}, 5–7	2–1	5–2	41–30	1
4	(Russia) Nikolay Davydenko	4–6, 3–6		3–6, 6–4, 2–6	6–4, 6–3	1–2	3–4	30–35	3
5	(United States) Andy Roddick	4–6, 2–6	6–3, 4–6, 6–2		6–1, 6–4	2–1	4–3	34–28	2
7	(Chile) Fernando González	3–6, 7–6^{(7–1)}, 7–5	4–6, 3–6	1–6, 4–6		1–2	2–5	29–41	4

Standings are determined by: 1. number of wins; 2. number of matches; 3. in two-players-ties, head-to-head records; 4. in three-players-ties, percentage of sets won, or of games won; 5. steering-committee decision.

=== Gold group ===
		(Spain) Nadal	(Serbia) Djokovic	(Spain) Ferrer	(France) Gasquet	RR W–L	Set W–L	Game W–L	Standings
2	(Spain) Rafael Nadal		6–4, 6–4	6–4, 4–6, 3–6	3–6, 6–3, 6–4	2–1	5–3	40–37	2
3	(Serbia) Novak Djokovic	4–6, 4–6		4–6, 4–6	4–6, 2–6	0–3	0–6	22–36	4
6	(Spain) David Ferrer	4–6, 6–4, 6–3	6–4, 6–4		6–1, 6–1	3–0	6–1	40–23	1
8	(France) Richard Gasquet	6–3, 3–6, 4–6	6–4, 6–2	1–6, 1–6		1–2	3–4	27–33	3

Standings are determined by: 1. number of wins; 2. number of matches; 3. in two-players-ties, head-to-head records; 4. in three-players-ties, percentage of sets won, or of games won; 5. steering-committee decision.

== See also ==
- ATP World Tour Finals appearances
