= 2008 Artois Championships =

- Date: 9–15 June
- Edition: 106th
- Category: International Series
- Draw: 56S / 24D
- Prize money: €692,000
- Surface: Grass / outdoor
- Location: London, United Kingdom
- Venue: Queen's Club

Champions

Singles
- (Spain) Rafael Nadal

Doubles
- (Canada) Daniel Nestor / (Serbia) Nenad Zimonjić
- Queen's Club Championships

The 2008 Artois Championships (also known traditionally as the Queen's Club Championships) was a tennis tournament played on outdoor grass courts. It was the 106th edition of the Artois Championships, and was part of the International Series of the 2008 ATP Tour. It took place at the Queen's Club in London, United Kingdom, from 9 through 15 June 2008.

The singles draw was headlined by ATP No. 2, four-time French Open champion Rafael Nadal, Australian Open winner and Roland-Garros semifinalist Novak Djokovic, and Queen's Club defending champion Andy Roddick. Also present in the field were Buenos Aires winner David Nalbandian, 2007 Mumbai titlist Richard Gasquet, Andy Murray, Paul-Henri Mathieu and Ivo Karlović.

== Finals ==
=== Singles ===
(Spain) Rafael Nadal defeated (Serbia) Novak Djokovic, 7–6^{(8–6)}, 7–5

- It was Nadal's 5th singles title of the year, and the 28th of his career.

=== Doubles ===
(Canada) Daniel Nestor / (Serbia) Nenad Zimonjić defeated (Brazil) Marcelo Melo / (Brazil) André Sá, 6–4, 7–6^{(7–3)}

== See also ==
- Djokovic–Nadal rivalry
