= 2008 Masters Series Hamburg – Doubles =

Doubles
- 2008 Masters Series Hamburg

Final
- Champions: (Canada) Daniel Nestor (Serbia) Nenad Zimonjić
- Runners-up: (United States) Bob Bryan (United States) Mike Bryan
- Score: 6–4, 5–7, [10–8]

Details
- Draw: 24
- Seeds: 8

Events
Singles	Doubles
- Masters Series Hamburg

Bob Bryan and Mike Bryan were the defending champions, but Daniel Nestor and Nenad Zimonjić defeated them 6–4, 5–7, [10–8], in the final.

== Seeds ==
All seeds receive a bye into the second round.

1. (United States) Bob Bryan / (United States) Mike Bryan (final)
2. (Canada) Daniel Nestor / (Serbia) Nenad Zimonjić (champions)
3. (Israel) Jonathan Erlich / (Israel) Andy Ram (second round)
4. (India) Mahesh Bhupathi / (The Bahamas) Mark Knowles (second round)
5. (Sweden) Simon Aspelin / (Austria) Julian Knowle (quarterfinals)
6. (Czech Republic) Martin Damm / (Czech Republic) Pavel Vízner (quarterfinals)
7. (Sweden) Jonas Björkman / (Zimbabwe) Kevin Ullyett (second round)
8. (Australia) Paul Hanley / (South Africa) Wesley Moodie (second round)

== Draw ==
Key

- Q = Qualifier
- WC = Wild card
- LL = Lucky loser
- Alt = Alternate
- ITF = ITF entry
- PR = Protected ranking
- SR = Special ranking
- SE = Special exempt
- JE = Junior exempt
- JR = Junior Accelerator Programme entrant
- CO = College Accelerator Programme entrant
- NG = Next Gen Accelerator Program entrant
- w/o = Walkover
- r = Retired
- d = Defaulted

=== Finals ===
Semifinals
1	(United States) Bob Bryan (United States) Mike Bryan	6	4	[10]
(United States) James Blake (United States) Mardy Fish	2	6	[7]
(India) Leander Paes (Spain) Tommy Robredo	3	6	[2]
2	(Canada) Daniel Nestor (Serbia) Nenad Zimonjić	6	3	[10]

Final
1	(United States) Bob Bryan (United States) Mike Bryan	4	7	[8]
2	(Canada) Daniel Nestor (Serbia) Nenad Zimonjić	6	5	[10]

=== Top half ===
First round
(France) N Mahut (France) P-H Mathieu	7	5	[8]
(Brazil) M Melo (Brazil) A Sá	5	7	[10]
(Germany) C Kas (Netherlands) R Wassen	5	1
(Poland) M Fyrstenberg (Poland) M Matkowski	7	6
(Russia) I Andreev (Russia) M Youzhny	1	4
(United States) J Blake (United States) M Fish	6	6
(Belarus) M Mirnyi (United Kingdom) J Murray	7	3	[7]
(France) J Benneteau (France) M Llodra	5	6	[10]

Second round
1	(United States) B Bryan (United States) M Bryan	7	7
(Brazil) M Melo (Brazil) A Sá	6^{4}	5
(Poland) M Fyrstenberg (Poland) M Matkowski	4	4
6	(Czech Republic) M Damm (Czech Republic) P Vízner	6	6
4	(India) M Bhupathi (The Bahamas) M Knowles	2	3
(United States) J Blake (United States) M Fish	6	6
(France) J Benneteau (France) M Llodra	6	6
7	(Sweden) J Björkman (Zimbabwe) K Ullyett	2	3

Quarterfinals
1	(United States) B Bryan (United States) M Bryan	7	6
6	(Czech Republic) M Damm (Czech Republic) P Vízner	5	4
(United States) J Blake (United States) M Fish	7	7
(France) J Benneteau (France) M Llodra	6^{6}	6^{5}

Semifinals
1	(United States) B Bryan (United States) M Bryan	6	4	[10]
(United States) J Blake (United States) M Fish	2	6	[7]

=== Bottom half ===
First round
(Peru) L Horna (Argentina) J Mónaco	3	1
ALT	(Croatia) I Ljubičić (Sweden) R Söderling	6	6
(Czech Republic) T Berdych (Russia) D Tursunov	1	7	[8]
(India) L Paes (Spain) T Robredo	6	5	[10]
(Sweden) R Lindstedt (Finland) J Nieminen	4	6	[10]
(Czech Republic) F Čermák (Australia) J Kerr	6	4	[12]
WC	(Germany) R Schüttler (Germany) A Waske	6	6
(France) G Simon (France) J-W Tsonga	3	4

Second round
8	(Australia) P Hanley (South Africa) W Moodie	4	2
ALT	(Croatia) I Ljubičić (Sweden) R Söderling	6	6
(India) L Paes (Spain) T Robredo	6	4	[10]
3	(Israel) J Erlich (Israel) A Ram	3	6	[2]
5	(Sweden) S Aspelin (Austria) J Knowle	6	6
(Czech Republic) F Čermák (Australia) J Kerr	3	2
WC	(Germany) R Schüttler (Germany) A Waske	2	7	[3]
2	(Canada) D Nestor (Serbia) N Zimonjić	6	6^{7}	[10]

Quarterfinals
ALT	(Croatia) I Ljubičić (Sweden) R Söderling	2	6^{3}
(India) L Paes (Spain) T Robredo	6	7
5	(Sweden) S Aspelin (Austria) J Knowle	2	7	[8]
2	(Canada) D Nestor (Serbia) N Zimonjić	6	5	[10]

Semifinals
(India) L Paes (Spain) T Robredo	3	6	[2]
2	(Canada) D Nestor (Serbia) N Zimonjić	6	3	[10]
