= 2008 Stella Artois Championships – Singles =

Singles
- 2008 Stella Artois Championships

Final
- Champion: (Spain) Rafael Nadal
- Runner-up: (Serbia) Novak Djokovic
- Score: 7–6^{(8–6)}, 7–5

Details
- Draw: 56
- Seeds: 16

Events
| Singles | Doubles |
- Queen's Club Championships

Rafael Nadal defeated Novak Djokovic in the final, 7–6^{(8–6)}, 7–5 to win the singles tennis title at the 2008 Queen's Club Championships.

Andy Roddick was the defending champion, but lost in the semifinals to Nadal. This marked the first time since 1999 that neither Lleyton Hewitt nor Roddick won the title.

== Seeds ==
The top eight seeds receive a bye into the second round.

1. (Spain) Rafael Nadal (champion)
2. (Serbia) Novak Djokovic (final)
3. (United States) Andy Roddick (semifinals)
4. (Argentina) David Nalbandian (semifinals)
5. (France) Richard Gasquet (quarterfinals)
6. (United Kingdom) Andy Murray (quarterfinals, withdrew due to a thumb injury)
7. (France) Paul-Henri Mathieu (third round)
8. (Croatia) Ivo Karlović (quarterfinals)
9. (Spain) Fernando Verdasco (second round)
10. (Chile) Fernando González (third round)
11. (Australia) Lleyton Hewitt (quarterfinals)
12. (Italy) Andreas Seppi (second round)
13. (Serbia) Janko Tipsarević (third round)
14. (Spain) Feliciano López (first round)
15. (United States) Mardy Fish (third round, retired due to an ankle injury)
16. (United States) Sam Querrey (first round)

== Draw ==
Key

- Q = Qualifier
- WC = Wild card
- LL = Lucky loser
- Alt = Alternate
- ITF = ITF entry
- PR = Protected ranking
- SR = Special ranking
- SE = Special exempt
- JE = Junior exempt
- JR = Junior Accelerator Programme entrant
- CO = College Accelerator Programme entrant
- NG = Next Gen Accelerator Program entrant
- w/o = Walkover
- r = Retired
- d = Defaulted

=== Finals ===
Quarterfinals
1 | (Spain) Rafael Nadal | 6^{5} | 7^{7} | 7^{7}
8 | (Croatia) Ivo Karlović | 7^{7} | 6^{5} | 6^{4}
3 | (United States) Andy Roddick | w/o
6 | (United Kingdom) Andy Murray
5 | (France) Richard Gasquet | 4 | 6 | 6^{3}
4 | (Argentina) David Nalbandian | 6 | 3 | 7^{7}
11 | (Australia) Lleyton Hewitt | 2 | 2
2 | (Serbia) Novak Djokovic | 6 | 6

Semifinals
1 | (Spain) Rafael Nadal | 7 | 6
3 | (United States) Andy Roddick | 5 | 4
4 | (Argentina) David Nalbandian | 1 | 0
2 | (Serbia) Novak Djokovic | 6 | 6

Final
1 | (Spain) Rafael Nadal | 7^{8} | 7
2 | (Serbia) Novak Djokovic | 6^{6} | 5

=== Top half ===
==== Section 1 ====
First round
WC | (Sweden) J Björkman | 7^{7} | 4 | 6
(Russia) I Kunitsyn | 6^{3} | 6 | 4
(Colombia) A Falla | 6 | 4 | 2
(Japan) K Nishikori | 2 | 6 | 6
(France) O Patience | 7 | 5 | 6
16 | (United States) S Querrey | 5 | 7 | 4
10 | (Chile) F González | 7^{7} | 6
Q | (United Kingdom) R Bloomfield | 6^{5} | 3
(Russia) M Safin | 4 | 6 | 6
Q | (United Kingdom) J Ward | 6 | 1 | 4
WC | (United Kingdom) A Bogdanovic | 3 | 3
Q | (Australia) J Sirianni | 6 | 6

Second round
1 | (Spain) R Nadal | 6 | 6
WC | (Sweden) J Björkman | 2 | 2
(Japan) K Nishikori | 7^{10} | 6
(France) O Patience | 6^{8} | 3
10 | (Chile) F González | 6 | 7^{7}
(Russia) M Safin | 3 | 6^{3}
Q | (Australia) J Sirianni | 3 | 2
8 | (Croatia) I Karlović | 6 | 6

Third round
1 | (Spain) R Nadal | 6 | 3 | 6
(Japan) K Nishikori | 4 | 6 | 3
10 | (Chile) F González | 3 | 5
8 | (Croatia) I Karlović | 6 | 7

Quarterfinals
1 | (Spain) R Nadal | 6^{5} | 7^{7} | 7^{7}
8 | (Croatia) I Karlović | 7^{7} | 6^{5} | 6^{4}

==== Section 2 ====
First round
(United States) R Ginepri | 6 | 7^{7}
(United States) V Spadea | 4 | 6^{4}
(Australia) C Guccione | 6 | 6^{2} | 7
(Chinese Taipei) Y-h Lu | 4 | 7^{7} | 5
(France) É Roger-Vasselin | 1 | 4
15 | (United States) M Fish | 6 | 6
12 | (Italy) A Seppi | 6 | 4 | 6
(France) A Clément | 3 | 6 | 1
(Belgium) K Vliegen | 4 | 5
(Latvia) E Gulbis | 6 | 7
(France) S Grosjean | 7^{8} | 6
Q | (South Africa) R de Voest | 6^{6} | 1

Second round
3 | (United States) A Roddick | 6^{6} | 6 | 6
(United States) R Ginepri | 7^{8} | 1 | 1
(Australia) C Guccione | 6 | 6^{0} | 4
15 | (United States) M Fish | 4 | 7^{7} | 6
12 | (Italy) A Seppi | 3 | 7^{9} | 3
(Latvia) E Gulbis | 6 | 6^{7} | 6
(France) S Grosjean | 0^{r}
6 | (United Kingdom) A Murray | 2

Third round
3 | (United States) A Roddick | 7^{7}
15 | (United States) M Fish | 6^{5} | r
(Latvia) E Gulbis | 7 | 1 | 4
6 | (United Kingdom) A Murray | 5 | 6 | 6

Quarterfinals
3 | (United States) A Roddick | w/o
6 | (United Kingdom) A Murray

=== Bottom half ===
==== Section 3 ====
First round
(Canada) F Dancevic | 2^{r}
(Italy) S Bolelli | 2
(Ecuador) N Lapentti | 5 | 3
(Croatia) M Ančić | 7 | 6
(South Korea) H-t Lee | 3^{r}
9 | (Spain) F Verdasco | 5
14 | (Spain) F López | 3 | 7^{7} | 6^{4}
(France) N Mahut | 6 | 6^{4} | 7^{7}
(South Africa) K Anderson | 6^{5} | 4
(United States) J Isner | 7^{7} | 6
(Israel) D Sela | 4 | 4
(Serbia) V Troicki | 6 | 6

Second round
5 | (France) R Gasquet | 6 | 6
(Italy) S Bolelli | 3 | 3
(Croatia) M Ančić | 7^{8} | 6
9 | (Spain) F Verdasco | 6^{6} | 4
(France) N Mahut | 7 | 6
(United States) J Isner | 5 | 4
(Serbia) V Troicki | 4 | 6^{4}
4 | (Argentina) D Nalbandian | 6 | 7^{7}

Third round
5 | (France) R Gasquet | 7^{7} | 6
(Croatia) M Ančić | 6^{5} | 4
(France) N Mahut | 4 | 1
4 | (Argentina) D Nalbandian | 6 | 6

Quarterfinals
5 | (France) R Gasquet | 4 | 6 | 6^{3}
4 | (Argentina) D Nalbandian | 6 | 3 | 7^{7}

==== Section 4 ====
First round
(Croatia) M Čilić | 7^{7} | 7^{7}
(Austria) J Melzer | 6^{2} | 6^{5}
WC | (United Kingdom) D Evans | 1 | 1
WC | (Belgium) X Malisse | 6 | 6
WC | (United Kingdom) J Goodall | 4 | 4
11 | (Australia) L Hewitt | 6 | 6
13 | (Serbia) J Tipsarević | 7^{7} | 6
(Spain) I Navarro | 6^{2} | 4
(United States) B Reynolds | 1 | 5
(Czech Republic) I Minář | 6 | 7
(Italy) F Cipolla | 4 | 3
(Croatia) R Karanušić | 6 | 6

Second round
7 | (France) P-H Mathieu | 6 | 3 | 6
(Croatia) M Čilić | 3 | 6 | 4
WC | (Belgium) X Malisse | 3 | 2
11 | (Australia) L Hewitt | 6 | 6
13 | (Serbia) J Tipsarević | 3 | 6 | 6
(Czech Republic) I Minář | 6 | 3 | 4
(Croatia) R Karanušić | 2 | 6^{7}
2 | (Serbia) N Djokovic | 6 | 7^{9}

Third round
7 | (France) P-H Mathieu | 4 | 4
11 | (Australia) L Hewitt | 6 | 6
13 | (Serbia) J Tipsarević | 6 | 1 | 4
2 | (Serbia) N Djokovic | 2 | 6 | 6

Quarterfinals
11 | (Australia) L Hewitt | 2 | 2
2 | (Serbia) N Djokovic | 6 | 6
