= 2015 Rafael Nadal tennis season =

Statistics for Spanish tennis player

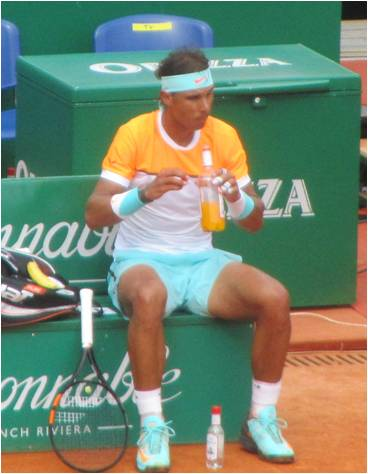
- Rafael Nadal at 2015 Monte-Carlo Masters
- Full name: Rafael Nadal Parera
- Country: Spain
- Calendar prize money: $3,943,888

Singles
- Season record: 61–20
- Calendar titles: 3
- Year-end ranking: No. 5
- Ranking change from previous year: ▼2

Grand Slam & significant results
- Australian Open: QF
- French Open: QF
- Wimbledon: 2R
- US Open: 3R

Doubles
- Season record: 13–7
- Calendar titles: 1
- Current ranking: 86
- Ranking change from previous year: ▲719

Grand Slam mixed doubles results
- Injuries: N/A
- Last updated on: 9 November 2015.

The 2015 Rafael Nadal tennis season officially began on 5 January 2015 with the start of the 2015 Qatar Open.

== Year in detail ==
=== Australian Open Series ===
==== Qatar Open ====
Nadal began the year as the defending champion at the Qatar Open. However, he lost in the first round, suffering a shocking three set defeat to world number 127 Michael Berrer. He won the doubles title with Juan Mónaco.

==== Australian Open ====
Nadal opened his 2015 Australian Open by defeating Mikhail Youzhny in straight sets. In the second round, he prevailed in a tough five-setter against American Tim Smyczek, despite being visibly unwell at times during the match. He then beat Dudi Sela and Kevin Anderson in straight sets to advance to his 28th career Grand Slam quarterfinal. He was defeated there by Tomáš Berdych, thus ending his 17-match win streak against the Czech. This resulted in Berdych becoming only the second player to defeat all four members of the Big Four at a Grand Slam, after Jo-Wilfried Tsonga.

=== South American clay court season ===
==== Rio Open ====
Nadal reached the semifinals of the Rio Open after defeating Thomaz Bellucci, Pablo Carreño Busta and Pablo Cuevas. However, he lost to Fabio Fognini in three sets in the semifinals, despite winning the first set and being a break up in the second. This was the first loss in his career against the Italian.

==== Argentina Open ====
Nadal played in the ATP Buenos Aires tournament, in Argentina, reaching the final without losing a set. He won his first singles title of 2015 and his 46th career clay-court title with a straight-sets victory over Juan Mónaco.

=== The March Masters ===
==== Indian Wells Masters ====
Nadal reached the quarterfinals of the Indian Wells Masters after beating his first three opponents in straight sets. However, his run was ended by Milos Raonic who beat him in three tight sets after Nadal squandered three match points in the second set tiebreak.

==== Miami Open ====
He next competed at the Miami Open, hoping to reach the final for the fifth time and win the tournament for the first time. He had a bye in the first round and proceeded by beating Nicolás Almagro in straight sets but he lost to Fernando Verdasco in the next round in three sets, failing to reach the fourth round of the Miami Open for the first time since 2006 (absent in 2013).

=== European clay court season ===
==== Monte-Carlo Masters ====
Nadal began his favourite part of the season in the clay courts of Monte-Carlo. After a first round bye, he defeated Lucas Pouille in a straight sets match before working hard to pass through big-serving John Isner in three tough sets to book his quarterfinal spot. He defeated David Ferrer in another tight, three set match to proceed to the semifinals, and record his first win over a top 10 player since the final of the 2014 French Open. However, he was defeated by world No.1 Novak Djokovic in the semifinals in straight sets.

==== Barcelona Open ====
Nadal received a bye in the first round of the 2015 Barcelona Open Banc Sabadell and faced Nicolás Almagro in the second round, completing his revenge for his only loss in Barcelona last year to him by beating him in straight sets. However, he was upset by Fabio Fognini in the next round in straight sets for the second time in the year. The loss made Fognini become the fifth man to beat Nadal on clay more than once after Gastón Gaudio, Roger Federer, Novak Djokovic, and David Ferrer. He also became the second man to beat Nadal on clay twice in a row in the same year after Djokovic in 2011.

==== Madrid Open ====
After a first round bye, Nadal had wins over Steve Johnson and Simone Bolelli, each in two sets. He faced Grigor Dimitrov in the quarterfinals and also dispatched him in straight sets. In the semifinals, Nadal had a two set win over Tomáš Berdych to reach his seventh Madrid Open final and 41st Masters 1000 final. He lost to Andy Murray in the final in straight sets. The loss saw Nadal drop out of the Top 5 for the first time since 2005, falling to No. 7.

==== Italian Open ====
Nadal was granted a first round bye and faced qualifier Marsel İlhan, dominating him in straight sets. He next faced the big-serving John Isner again in the third round and defeated him in straight sets to advance to the quarterfinals. He was taken down by Stan Wawrinka in the quarterfinals in straight sets, squandering a 6–2 lead in the first set tiebreak and four set points, marking the first time since 2008 that he did not reach the final at the tournament. This also marked the first time since 2004 that Nadal failed to win a single European clay court title before the French Open.

==== French Open ====
Nadal opened his campaign for a 10th French Open title by facing off against wildcard Quentin Halys, beating him in straight sets. He then defeated compatriot Nicolás Almagro and Andrey Kuznetsov, again both in straight sets. In the fourth round he defeated Jack Sock in four sets, but eventually lost to Novak Djokovic in the quarterfinals. The loss ended Nadal's 5 year winning streak at Roland Garros and was just his second loss ever at the tournament. This loss also marked the first time since 2004 that Nadal failed to win at least one of the first two Grand Slam events of the season. As a result, his ranking dropped to No. 10 in the ATP singles ranking, his lowest ranking since April 2005.

=== The grass season ===
==== Stuttgart Open ====
Nadal opened his grass-court season campaign by participating in the Stuttgart Open and survived his first match against Marcos Baghdatis by beating him in three tight sets. He next faces Bernard Tomic and booked his semifinal spot by beating him in another three tight sets. Nadal reached his first grass-court tournament final since reaching the 2011 Wimbledon final by beating Gaël Monfils in straight sets. Nadal won his third Stuttgart title and first grass-court title for the first time since winning the 2010 Wimbledon Championships by beating Viktor Troicki in straight sets in the final. It was only his 2nd title of 2015.

==== Queen's Club Championships ====
Nadal played at the Queen's Club for the first time since 2011 as the fifth seed. He was knocked out in the first round by Alexandr Dolgopolov, who had previously beaten him at the 2014 BNP Paribas Open.

==== Wimbledon ====
Nadal played at the 2015 Wimbledon as tenth seed. After beating Thomaz Bellucci in the first round in straight sets, he was eliminated in the second round in four sets by Dustin Brown. By winning, Brown became the first ever qualifier to ever beat Nadal at a Grand Slam.

=== US Open Series ===
==== German Open ====
Nadal decided to participate in the German Open for the first time since he defeated Roger Federer in the 2008 final in this tournament. He faced a tough opponent, Fernando Verdasco, in the first round but managed to defeat him in three sets. He next faced Jiří Veselý and easily dispatched him in straight sets followed by another straightforward quarterfinal victory against Pablo Cuevas to set a semifinal encounter with Andreas Seppi, which he won again in straight sets. Nadal extended his streak of winning at least one European clay-court title every year since winning in 2004 by beating Fabio Fognini in the Hamburg final in straight sets.

==== Canadian Open ====
Nadal opened his hard-court season campaign in Canada where he had won the title 3 times. He faced Sergiy Stakhovsky as his first opponent and defeated him in straight sets. He beat Mikhail Youzhny in the third round and advanced to QF, where he lost to Kei Nishikori in straight sets. This marked the first time in eight meetings that he lost a match against the Japanese player.

==== Cincinnati Masters ====
Nadal participated in the Cincinnati Masters the following week, hoping to repeat his 2013 feat by winning this tournament. He opened his campaign against Frenchman Jérémy Chardy and successfully defeated the Rogers Cup semi-finalist in straight sets to book his third round clash with compatriot Feliciano López, which he lost in three sets.

==== US Open ====
In the final major of the season, Nadal once again faced Fognini, and again was defeated by the player from Italy, losing in the third round. In that match, Nadal won the first two sets, and previously had been 151–0 in Grand Slam matches that he led two sets to love(0). However, Fognini still defeated Nadal in five sets. The upset loss ended Nadal's record 10-year streak of winning at least one major, and leaving him one year short of the record 11-year streak of reaching at least one major final (shared by Lendl and Sampras). This remained the only time he had lost a Grand Slam tournament singles match after starting with a 2-0 lead until the quarterfinals of the 2021 Australian Open where he lost to Stefanos Tsitsipas.

=== Asian Fall & Indoor Hard Court Season ===
==== Davis Cup ====
Nadal and many of his Spanish compatriots made a comeback to the Spanish Davis Cup team after the captain of the Spanish Davis Cup team, Gala Leon, was fired due to several critics and rebellions from the Spanish tennis players like Nadal and Ferrer. Spain was now at the Europe Africa Zone due to several consecutive losses. Spain meets Denmark in the 1st round play-offs and easily defeated Denmark with a dominant 5–0 score with Rafa winning in both doubles and singles. He won against Mikael Torpegaard in straight sets.

==== China Open ====
Nadal started the Asian Fall by participating in the China Open where he managed to reach the quarterfinals after beating home hope Wu Di and Vasek Pospisil both in straight sets. He survived a quarterfinal test against Jack Sock after comebacking from a set down to set a fifth meeting this year with his nemesis Fabio Fognini. He succeeded in exacting revenge against Fognini by beating him in straight sets to reach his first hard-court tournament final for more than a year. Nadal lost to World No.1 Novak Djokovic in the final 2-6, 2-6.

==== Shanghai Masters ====
Nadal received a first round bye into this ATP Masters 1000 event and faced Ivo Karlović in the second round. Nadal won the first set 7-5 after initially trailing 3-5 but Karlovic forced the second set to a decider which he won 6-7(4). After 2 hours and 44 minutes, Nadal prevailed in the third and final set decider 7-6(4) and won the match. Nadal then avenged his Indian Wells quarterfinals lost against Milos Raonic by beating him in straight sets to reach the quarterfinals. He defeated World No.4 and 2015 French Open Champion Stan Wawrinka in straight sets to reach his first semifinal of a Masters 1000 hard-court tournament in more than a year and with this win, Nadal qualified for the ATP World Tour Finals. Despite sporting an 8-3 head-to-head winning record against Jo-Wilfried Tsonga, Nadal fell to the Frenchman in the semi-finals in three sets 4–6, 6–0, 5–7.

==== Swiss Indoors ====
Nadal participated in the Swiss Indoors ATP 500 at Basel and survived a scare in the first round against Lukáš Rosol by beating him in a comeback three-setter where Rosol was 2 points away from winning at the 2nd set at 5-4 on his own serve. In Nadal's next match against Grigor Dimitrov, Rafa battled back from a break down in the final set to defeat Dimitrov 6-4, 4-6, 6-3 to reach the Swiss Indoors quarter-finals. Nadal came back from a set and a break down to surpass big-serving Croatian Marin Čilić in three sets. Nadal reached the second final in a hard-court tournament of the season when he beat Frenchman Richard Gasquet in straight sets to set his first meeting for almost 2 years with long-time rival Roger Federer. However, in his first final at the Swiss Indoor, Nadal lost 3-6, 7-5, 3-6 to Federer.

==== Paris Masters ====
Nadal, seeded 7th, received a bye into the Round of 32 of the Paris Masters in Paris, France. Rafa rolled into the Round of 16 with a 6-2, 6-2 win, his 2nd in back-to-back weeks, over Lukáš Rosol, the 66th-ranked Czech, in just over an hour. Nadal then took on the big hitting South African Kevin Anderson and made another comeback from a set down and 5-6 down in the second set tie-break, saving a match point and closing out the match by breaking twice in the third set. Nadal faced world No.4 Stan Wawrinka in the quarterfinals and despite pushing both sets to a tiebreaker, Rafa lost the match 6–7^{(8–10)}, 6–7^{(7–9)}.

=== ATP World Tour Finals ===
Rafael Nadal was seeded fifth in the 2015 ATP World Tour Finals in London and was drawn in the Ilie Năstase Group alongside Andy Murray, David Ferrer and Stan Wawrinka. He first played against Wawrinka and successfully crushed his nemesis in straight sets. Nadal continued his blistering resurgence of form by dominating a fellow Big Four, Murray, in straight sets to claim a semifinal spot in the ATP Finals. He then beat Ferrer in three sets, advancing to the semifinals with three wins. But he then lost to Novak Djokovic in straight sets.

== All matches ==
Key
W	F	SF	QF	#R	RR	Q#	P#	DNQ	A	Z#	PO	G	S	B	NMS	NTI	P	NH

(W) winner; (F) finalist; (SF) semifinalist; (QF) quarterfinalist; (#R) rounds 4, 3, 2, 1; (RR) round-robin stage; (Q#) qualification round; (P#) preliminary round; (DNQ) did not qualify; (A) absent; (Z#) Davis/Fed Cup Zonal Group (with number indication) or (PO) play-off; (G) gold, (S) silver or (B) bronze Olympic/Paralympic medal; (NMS) not a Masters tournament; (NTI) not a Tier I tournament; (P) postponed; (NH) not held; (SR) strike rate (events won / competed); (W–L) win–loss record.
To avoid confusion and double counting, these charts are updated at the conclusion of a tournament or when the player's participation has ended.

=== Singles matches ===
Tournament	Match	Round	Opponent (seed or key)	Rank	Result	Score
Qatar Open; Doha, Qatar; ATP 250; Hard, outdoor 4 – 10 January 2015
Qatar Open; Doha, Qatar; ATP 250; Hard, outdoor 4 – 10 January 2015	1 / 847	1R	(Germany) Michael Berrer (Q)	127	Loss	6–1, 3–6, 4–6
Australian Open; Melbourne, Australia; Grand Slam tournament Hard, outdoor 19 January – 1 February 2015
Australian Open; Melbourne, Australia; Grand Slam tournament Hard, outdoor 19 January – 1 February 2015	2 / 848	1R	(Russia) Mikhail Youzhny	49	Win	6–3, 6–2, 6–2
Australian Open; Melbourne, Australia; Grand Slam tournament Hard, outdoor 19 January – 1 February 2015	3 / 849	2R	(United States) Tim Smyczek (Q)	112	Win	6–2, 3–6, 6–7^{(2–7)}, 6–3, 7–5
Australian Open; Melbourne, Australia; Grand Slam tournament Hard, outdoor 19 January – 1 February 2015	4 / 850	3R	(Israel) Dudi Sela	106	Win	6–1, 6–0, 7–5
Australian Open; Melbourne, Australia; Grand Slam tournament Hard, outdoor 19 January – 1 February 2015	5 / 851	4R	(South Africa) Kevin Anderson (14)	15	Win	7–5, 6–1, 6–4
Australian Open; Melbourne, Australia; Grand Slam tournament Hard, outdoor 19 January – 1 February 2015	6 / 852	QF	(Czech Republic) Tomáš Berdych (7)	7	Loss	2–6, 0–6, 6–7^{(5–7)}
Rio Open; Rio de Janeiro, Brazil; ATP 500; Clay, outdoor 16 – 22 February 2015
Rio Open; Rio de Janeiro, Brazil; ATP 500; Clay, outdoor 16 – 22 February 2015	7 / 853	1R	(Brazil) Thomaz Bellucci	64	Win	6–4, 6–1
Rio Open; Rio de Janeiro, Brazil; ATP 500; Clay, outdoor 16 – 22 February 2015	8 / 854	2R	(Spain) Pablo Carreño Busta	55	Win	7–5, 6–3
Rio Open; Rio de Janeiro, Brazil; ATP 500; Clay, outdoor 16 – 22 February 2015	9 / 855	QF	(Uruguay) Pablo Cuevas (6)	23	Win	4–6, 7–5, 6–0
Rio Open; Rio de Janeiro, Brazil; ATP 500; Clay, outdoor 16 – 22 February 2015	10 / 856	SF	(Italy) Fabio Fognini (4)	28	Loss	6–1, 2–6, 5–7
Argentina Open; Buenos Aires, Argentina; ATP 250; Clay, outdoor 23 February – 1 March 2015
Argentina Open; Buenos Aires, Argentina; ATP 250; Clay, outdoor 23 February – 1 March 2015	–	1R	Bye			
Argentina Open; Buenos Aires, Argentina; ATP 250; Clay, outdoor 23 February – 1 March 2015	11 / 857	2R	(Argentina) Facundo Argüello (Q)	146	Win	6–4, 6–0
Argentina Open; Buenos Aires, Argentina; ATP 250; Clay, outdoor 23 February – 1 March 2015	12 / 858	QF	(Argentina) Federico Delbonis	59	Win	6–1, 6–1
Argentina Open; Buenos Aires, Argentina; ATP 250; Clay, outdoor 23 February – 1 March 2015	13 / 859	SF	(Argentina) Carlos Berlocq	74	Win	7–6^{(9–7)}, 6–2
Argentina Open; Buenos Aires, Argentina; ATP 250; Clay, outdoor 23 February – 1 March 2015	14 / 860	W	(Argentina) Juan Mónaco	60	Win (1)	6–4, 6–1
Indian Wells Masters; Indian Wells, United States; ATP 1000; Hard, outdoor 9 – 22 March 2015
Indian Wells Masters; Indian Wells, United States; ATP 1000; Hard, outdoor 9 – 22 March 2015	–	1R	Bye			
Indian Wells Masters; Indian Wells, United States; ATP 1000; Hard, outdoor 9 – 22 March 2015	15 / 861	2R	(Netherlands) Igor Sijsling	134	Win	6–4, 6–2
Indian Wells Masters; Indian Wells, United States; ATP 1000; Hard, outdoor 9 – 22 March 2015	16 / 862	3R	(United States) Donald Young	47	Win	6–4, 6–2
Indian Wells Masters; Indian Wells, United States; ATP 1000; Hard, outdoor 9 – 22 March 2015	17 / 863	4R	(France) Gilles Simon (13)	14	Win	6–2, 6–4
Indian Wells Masters; Indian Wells, United States; ATP 1000; Hard, outdoor 9 – 22 March 2015	18 / 864	QF	(Canada) Milos Raonic (6)	6	Loss	6–4, 6–7^{(10–12)}, 5–7
Miami Open; Miami, United States; ATP 1000; Hard, outdoor 24 – 4 April 2015
Miami Open; Miami, United States; ATP 1000; Hard, outdoor 24 – 4 April 2015	–	1R	Bye			
Miami Open; Miami, United States; ATP 1000; Hard, outdoor 24 – 4 April 2015	19 / 865	2R	(Spain) Nicolás Almagro	74	Won	6–4, 6–2
Miami Open; Miami, United States; ATP 1000; Hard, outdoor 24 – 4 April 2015	20 / 866	3R	(Spain) Fernando Verdasco (29)	34	Loss	4–6, 6–2, 3–6
Monte-Carlo Masters; Monte Carlo, Monaco; ATP 1000; Clay, outdoor 12–19 April 2015
Monte-Carlo Masters; Monte Carlo, Monaco; ATP 1000; Clay, outdoor 12–19 April 2015	–	1R	Bye			
Monte-Carlo Masters; Monte Carlo, Monaco; ATP 1000; Clay, outdoor 12–19 April 2015	21 / 867	2R	(France) Lucas Pouille	108	Win	6–2, 6–1
Monte-Carlo Masters; Monte Carlo, Monaco; ATP 1000; Clay, outdoor 12–19 April 2015	22 / 868	3R	(United States) John Isner (15)	19	Win	7–6^{(8–6)}, 4–6, 6–3
Monte-Carlo Masters; Monte Carlo, Monaco; ATP 1000; Clay, outdoor 12–19 April 2015	23 / 869	QF	(Spain) David Ferrer (5)	7	Win	6–4, 5–7, 6–2
Monte-Carlo Masters; Monte Carlo, Monaco; ATP 1000; Clay, outdoor 12–19 April 2015	24 / 870	SF	(Serbia) Novak Djokovic (1)	1	Loss	3–6, 3–6
Barcelona Open; Barcelona, Spain; ATP 500; Clay, outdoor 20–26 April 2015
Barcelona Open; Barcelona, Spain; ATP 500; Clay, outdoor 20–26 April 2015	–	1R	Bye			
Barcelona Open; Barcelona, Spain; ATP 500; Clay, outdoor 20–26 April 2015	25 / 871	2R	(Spain) Nicolás Almagro	123	Win	6–3, 6–1
Barcelona Open; Barcelona, Spain; ATP 500; Clay, outdoor 20–26 April 2015	26 / 872	3R	(Italy) Fabio Fognini (13)	30	Loss	4–6, 6–7^{(6–8)}
Madrid Open; Madrid, Spain; ATP 1000; Clay, outdoor 4–10 May 2015
Madrid Open; Madrid, Spain; ATP 1000; Clay, outdoor 4–10 May 2015	–	1R	Bye			
Madrid Open; Madrid, Spain; ATP 1000; Clay, outdoor 4–10 May 2015	27 / 873	2R	(United States) Steve Johnson	54	Win	6–4, 6–3
Madrid Open; Madrid, Spain; ATP 1000; Clay, outdoor 4–10 May 2015	28 / 874	3R	(Italy) Simone Bolelli	63	Win	6–2, 6–2
Madrid Open; Madrid, Spain; ATP 1000; Clay, outdoor 4–10 May 2015	29 / 875	QF	(Bulgaria) Grigor Dimitrov (10)	11	Win	6–3, 6–4
Madrid Open; Madrid, Spain; ATP 1000; Clay, outdoor 4–10 May 2015	30 / 876	SF	(Czech Republic) Tomáš Berdych (6)	7	Win	7–6^{(7–3)}, 6–1
Madrid Open; Madrid, Spain; ATP 1000; Clay, outdoor 4–10 May 2015	31 / 877	F	(United Kingdom) Andy Murray (2)	3	Loss (1)	3–6, 2–6
Italian Open; Rome, Italy; ATP 1000; Clay, outdoor 11–17 May 2015
Italian Open; Rome, Italy; ATP 1000; Clay, outdoor 11–17 May 2015	–	1R	Bye			
Italian Open; Rome, Italy; ATP 1000; Clay, outdoor 11–17 May 2015	32 / 878	2R	(Turkey) Marsel İlhan (Q)	87	Win	6–2, 6–0
Italian Open; Rome, Italy; ATP 1000; Clay, outdoor 11–17 May 2015	33 / 879	3R	(United States) John Isner (16)	17	Win	6–4, 6–4
Italian Open; Rome, Italy; ATP 1000; Clay, outdoor 11–17 May 2015	34 / 880	QF	(Switzerland) Stan Wawrinka (8)	9	Loss	6–7^{(7–9)}, 2–6
French Open; Paris, France; Grand Slam tournament Clay, outdoor 24 May – 7 June 2015
French Open; Paris, France; Grand Slam tournament Clay, outdoor 24 May – 7 June 2015	35 / 881	1R	(France) Quentin Halys (WC)	304	Win	6–3, 6–3, 6–4
French Open; Paris, France; Grand Slam tournament Clay, outdoor 24 May – 7 June 2015	36 / 882	2R	(Spain) Nicolás Almagro	154	Win	6–4, 6–3, 6–1
French Open; Paris, France; Grand Slam tournament Clay, outdoor 24 May – 7 June 2015	37 / 883	3R	(Russia) Andrey Kuznetsov	120	Win	6–1, 6–3, 6–2
French Open; Paris, France; Grand Slam tournament Clay, outdoor 24 May – 7 June 2015	38 / 884	4R	(United States) Jack Sock	37	Win	6–3, 6–1, 5–7, 6–2
French Open; Paris, France; Grand Slam tournament Clay, outdoor 24 May – 7 June 2015	39 / 885	QF	(Serbia) Novak Djokovic (1)	1	Loss	5–7, 3–6, 1–6
Stuttgart Open; Stuttgart, Germany; ATP 250; Grass, outdoor 8–14 June 2015
Stuttgart Open; Stuttgart, Germany; ATP 250; Grass, outdoor 8–14 June 2015	–	1R	Bye			
Stuttgart Open; Stuttgart, Germany; ATP 250; Grass, outdoor 8–14 June 2015	40 / 886	2R	(Cyprus) Marcos Baghdatis	63	Win	7–6^{(7–5)}, 6–7^{(4–7)}, 6–2
Stuttgart Open; Stuttgart, Germany; ATP 250; Grass, outdoor 8–14 June 2015	41 / 887	QF	(Australia) Bernard Tomic (5)	24	Win	6–4, 6–7^{(6–8)}, 6–3
Stuttgart Open; Stuttgart, Germany; ATP 250; Grass, outdoor 8–14 June 2015	42 / 888	SF	(France) Gaël Monfils (4)	16	Win	6–3, 6–4
Stuttgart Open; Stuttgart, Germany; ATP 250; Grass, outdoor 8–14 June 2015	33 / 889	W	(Serbia) Viktor Troicki (8)	28	Win (2)	7–6^{(7–3)}, 6–3
Queen's Club Championships; London, United Kingdom; ATP 500; Grass, outdoor 15–21 June 2015
Queen's Club Championships; London, United Kingdom; ATP 500; Grass, outdoor 15–21 June 2015	44 / 890	1R	(Ukraine) Alexandr Dolgopolov	75	Loss	3–6, 7–6^{(8–6)}, 4–6
Wimbledon Championships; London, United Kingdom; Grand Slam tournament Grass, outdoor 29 June – 12 July 2015
Wimbledon Championships; London, United Kingdom; Grand Slam tournament Grass, outdoor 29 June – 12 July 2015	45 / 891	1R	(Brazil) Thomaz Bellucci	42	Win	6–4, 6–2, 6–4
Wimbledon Championships; London, United Kingdom; Grand Slam tournament Grass, outdoor 29 June – 12 July 2015	46 / 892	2R	(Germany) Dustin Brown (Q)	102	Loss	5–7, 6–3, 4–6, 4–6
German Open; Hamburg, Germany; ATP 500; Clay, outdoor 27 July – 2 August 2015
German Open; Hamburg, Germany; ATP 500; Clay, outdoor 27 July – 2 August 2015	47 / 893	1R	(Spain) Fernando Verdasco	41	Win	3–6, 6–1, 6–1
German Open; Hamburg, Germany; ATP 500; Clay, outdoor 27 July – 2 August 2015	48 / 894	2R	(Czech Republic) Jiří Veselý	45	Win	6–4, 7–6^{(7–2)}
German Open; Hamburg, Germany; ATP 500; Clay, outdoor 27 July – 2 August 2015	49 / 895	QF	(Uruguay) Pablo Cuevas (5)	31	Win	6–3, 6–2
German Open; Hamburg, Germany; ATP 500; Clay, outdoor 27 July – 2 August 2015	50 / 896	SF	(Italy) Andreas Seppi (4)	26	Win	6–1, 6–2
German Open; Hamburg, Germany; ATP 500; Clay, outdoor 27 July – 2 August 2015	51 / 897	W	(Italy) Fabio Fognini (8)	32	Win (3)	7–5, 7–5
Canadian Open; Montreal, Canada; ATP 1000; Hard, outdoor 10 – 16 August 2015
Canadian Open; Montreal, Canada; ATP 1000; Hard, outdoor 10 – 16 August 2015	–	1R	Bye			
Canadian Open; Montreal, Canada; ATP 1000; Hard, outdoor 10 – 16 August 2015	52 / 898	2R	(Ukraine) Sergiy Stakhovsky	60	Win	7–6^{(7–4)}, 6–3
Canadian Open; Montreal, Canada; ATP 1000; Hard, outdoor 10 – 16 August 2015	53 / 899	3R	(Russia) Mikhail Youzhny	101	Win	6–3, 6–3
Canadian Open; Montreal, Canada; ATP 1000; Hard, outdoor 10 – 16 August 2015	54 / 900	QF	(Japan) Kei Nishikori (4)	4	Loss	2–6, 4–6
Cincinnati Masters; Cincinnati, United States; ATP 1000; Hard, outdoor 17 – 23 August 2015
Cincinnati Masters; Cincinnati, United States; ATP 1000; Hard, outdoor 17 – 23 August 2015	–	1R	Bye			
Cincinnati Masters; Cincinnati, United States; ATP 1000; Hard, outdoor 17 – 23 August 2015	55 / 901	2R	(France) Jérémy Chardy	27	Win	6–3, 6–4
Cincinnati Masters; Cincinnati, United States; ATP 1000; Hard, outdoor 17 – 23 August 2015	56 / 902	3R	(Spain) Feliciano López	23	Loss	7–5, 4–6, 6–7^{(3–7)}
US Open; New York City, United States; Grand Slam tournament Hard, outdoor 31 August – 13 September 2015
US Open; New York City, United States; Grand Slam tournament Hard, outdoor 31 August – 13 September 2015	57 / 903	1R	(Croatia) Borna Ćorić	35	Win	6–3, 6–2, 4–6, 6–4
US Open; New York City, United States; Grand Slam tournament Hard, outdoor 31 August – 13 September 2015	58 / 904	2R	(Argentina) Diego Schwartzman	74	Win	7–6^{(7–5)}, 6–3, 7–5
US Open; New York City, United States; Grand Slam tournament Hard, outdoor 31 August – 13 September 2015	59 / 905	3R	(Italy) Fabio Fognini (32)	32	Loss	6–3, 6–4, 4–6, 3–6, 4–6
Davis Cup Group I Odense, Denmark; Davis Cup; Hard, indoor 18 – 20 September 2015
Davis Cup Group I Odense, Denmark; Davis Cup; Hard, indoor 18 – 20 September 2015	60 / 906	RR	(Denmark) Mikael Torpegaard	909	Win	6–4, 6–3, 6–2
China Open; Beijing, China; ATP 500; Hard, outdoor 5 – 11 October 2015
China Open; Beijing, China; ATP 500; Hard, outdoor 5 – 11 October 2015	61 / 907	1R	(China) Wu Di	224	Win	6–4, 6–4
China Open; Beijing, China; ATP 500; Hard, outdoor 5 – 11 October 2015	62 / 908	2R	(Canada) Vasek Pospisil	44	Win	7–6^{(7–3)}, 6–4
China Open; Beijing, China; ATP 500; Hard, outdoor 5 – 11 October 2015	63 / 909	QF	(United States) Jack Sock	30	Win	3–6, 6–4, 6–3
China Open; Beijing, China; ATP 500; Hard, outdoor 5 – 11 October 2015	64 / 910	SF	(Italy) Fabio Fognini	28	Win	7–5, 6–3
China Open; Beijing, China; ATP 500; Hard, outdoor 5 – 11 October 2015	65 / 911	F	(Serbia) Novak Djokovic (1)	1	Loss (2)	2–6, 2–6
Shanghai Masters; Shanghai, China; ATP 1000; Hard, outdoor 12 – 18 October 2015
Shanghai Masters; Shanghai, China; ATP 1000; Hard, outdoor 12 – 18 October 2015	–	1R	Bye			
Shanghai Masters; Shanghai, China; ATP 1000; Hard, outdoor 12 – 18 October 2015	66 / 912	2R	(Croatia) Ivo Karlović	21	Win	7–5, 6–7^{(4–7)}, 7–6^{(7–4)}
Shanghai Masters; Shanghai, China; ATP 1000; Hard, outdoor 12 – 18 October 2015	67 / 913	3R	(Canada) Milos Raonic (9)	9	Win	6–3, 7–6^{(7–3)}
Shanghai Masters; Shanghai, China; ATP 1000; Hard, outdoor 12 – 18 October 2015	68 / 914	QF	(Switzerland) Stan Wawrinka (4)	4	Win	6–2, 6–1
Shanghai Masters; Shanghai, China; ATP 1000; Hard, outdoor 12 – 18 October 2015	69 / 915	SF	(France) Jo-Wilfried Tsonga (16)	15	Loss	4–6, 6–0, 5–7
Swiss Indoors; Basel, Switzerland; ATP 500; Hard, indoor 26 October – 1 November 2015
Swiss Indoors; Basel, Switzerland; ATP 500; Hard, indoor 26 October – 1 November 2015	70 / 916	1R	(Czech Republic) Lukáš Rosol	78	Win	1–6, 7–5, 7–6^{(7–4)}
Swiss Indoors; Basel, Switzerland; ATP 500; Hard, indoor 26 October – 1 November 2015	71 / 917	2R	(Bulgaria) Grigor Dimitrov	28	Win	6–4, 4–6, 6–3
Swiss Indoors; Basel, Switzerland; ATP 500; Hard, indoor 26 October – 1 November 2015	72 / 918	QF	(Croatia) Marin Čilić (7)	13	Win	4–6, 6–3, 6–3
Swiss Indoors; Basel, Switzerland; ATP 500; Hard, indoor 26 October – 1 November 2015	73 / 919	SF	(France) Richard Gasquet (5)	11	Win	6–4, 7–6^{(9–7)}
Swiss Indoors; Basel, Switzerland; ATP 500; Hard, indoor 26 October – 1 November 2015	74 / 920	F	(Switzerland) Roger Federer (1)	3	Loss (3)	3–6, 7–5, 3–6
Paris Masters; Paris, France; ATP 1000; Hard, indoor 2 – 8 November 2015
Paris Masters; Paris, France; ATP 1000; Hard, indoor 2 – 8 November 2015	–	1R	Bye			
Paris Masters; Paris, France; ATP 1000; Hard, indoor 2 – 8 November 2015	75 / 921	2R	(Czech Republic) Lukáš Rosol (Q)	66	Win	6–2, 6–2
Paris Masters; Paris, France; ATP 1000; Hard, indoor 2 – 8 November 2015	76 / 922	3R	(South Africa) Kevin Anderson (11)	12	Win	4–6, 7–6^{(8–6)}, 6–2
Paris Masters; Paris, France; ATP 1000; Hard, indoor 2 – 8 November 2015	77 / 923	QF	(Switzerland) Stan Wawrinka (4)	4	Loss	6–7^{(8–10)}, 6–7^{(7–9)}
ATP World Tour Finals; London, United Kingdom; ATP Finals; Hard, indoor 15 – 22 November 2015
ATP World Tour Finals; London, United Kingdom; ATP Finals; Hard, indoor 15 – 22 November 2015	78 / 924	RR	(Switzerland) Stan Wawrinka (4)	4	Win	6–3, 6–2
ATP World Tour Finals; London, United Kingdom; ATP Finals; Hard, indoor 15 – 22 November 2015	79 / 925	RR	(United Kingdom) Andy Murray (2)	2	Win	6–4, 6–1
ATP World Tour Finals; London, United Kingdom; ATP Finals; Hard, indoor 15 – 22 November 2015	80 / 926	RR	(Spain) David Ferrer (7)	7	Win	6–7^{(2–7)}, 6–3, 6–4
ATP World Tour Finals; London, United Kingdom; ATP Finals; Hard, indoor 15 – 22 November 2015	81 / 927	SF	(Serbia) Novak Djokovic (1)	1	Loss	3–6, 3–6

=== Doubles matches ===
Tournament	Match	Round	Opponents (seed or key)	Ranks	Result	Score
Qatar Open; Doha, Qatar; ATP 250; Hard, outdoor 4 – 10 January 2015; Partner: (Argentina) Juan Mónaco
Qatar Open; Doha, Qatar; ATP 250; Hard, outdoor 4 – 10 January 2015; Partner: (Argentina) Juan Mónaco	1 / 168	1R	(Italy) Simone Bolelli / (Argentina) Leonardo Mayer	#139 / #67	Win	6–3, 6–3
Qatar Open; Doha, Qatar; ATP 250; Hard, outdoor 4 – 10 January 2015; Partner: (Argentina) Juan Mónaco	2 / 169	QF	(Germany) Benjamin Becker / (Australia) Artem Sitak	#192 / #66	Win	2–6, 6–2, [10–6]
Qatar Open; Doha, Qatar; ATP 250; Hard, outdoor 4 – 10 January 2015; Partner: (Argentina) Juan Mónaco	3 / 170	SF	(Serbia) Novak Djokovic / (Serbia) Filip Krajinović (WC)	#568 / #1449	Win	7–6^{(7–3)}, 6–1
Qatar Open; Doha, Qatar; ATP 250; Hard, outdoor 4 – 10 January 2015; Partner: (Argentina) Juan Mónaco	4 / 171	W	(Austria) Julian Knowle / (Austria) Philipp Oswald	#40 / #53	Win (1)	6–3, 6–4
Argentina Open; Buenos Aires, Argentina; ATP 250; Clay, outdoor 23 February – 1 March 2015; Partner: (Argentina) Juan Mónaco
Argentina Open; Buenos Aires, Argentina; ATP 250; Clay, outdoor 23 February – 1 March 2015; Partner: (Argentina) Juan Mónaco	5 / 172	1R	(Czech Republic) František Čermák / (Czech Republic) Jiří Veselý	#60 / #103	Win	4–6, 7–5, [10–7]
Argentina Open; Buenos Aires, Argentina; ATP 250; Clay, outdoor 23 February – 1 March 2015; Partner: (Argentina) Juan Mónaco	6 / 173	QF	(Argentina) Federico Delbonis / (Argentina) Andrés Molteni (WC)	#241 / #138	Loss	4–6, 6–3, [7–10]
Indian Wells Masters; Indian Wells, United States; ATP 1000; Hard, outdoor 9 – 22 March 2015; Partner: (Spain) Pablo Carreño
Indian Wells Masters; Indian Wells, United States; ATP 1000; Hard, outdoor 9 – 22 March 2015; Partner: (Spain) Pablo Carreño	7 / 174	1R	(Uruguay) Pablo Cuevas / (Spain) David Marrero	#23 / #23	Win	6–2, 6–1
Indian Wells Masters; Indian Wells, United States; ATP 1000; Hard, outdoor 9 – 22 March 2015; Partner: (Spain) Pablo Carreño	8 / 175	2R	(Spain) Marcel Granollers / (Spain) Marc López (6)	#11 / #14	Win	6–4, 6–4
Indian Wells Masters; Indian Wells, United States; ATP 1000; Hard, outdoor 9 – 22 March 2015; Partner: (Spain) Pablo Carreño	9 / 176	QF	(Italy) Simone Bolelli / (Italy) Fabio Fognini	#49 / #22	Loss	1–6, 6–3, [4–10]
Stuttgart Open; Stuttgart, Germany; ATP 250; Grass, outdoor 8 – 14 June 2015; Partner: (Spain) Feliciano López
Stuttgart Open; Stuttgart, Germany; ATP 250; Grass, outdoor 8 – 14 June 2015; Partner: (Spain) Feliciano López	10 / 177	1R	(Australia) Rameez Junaid / (Canada) Adil Shamasdin	#67 / #60	Win	7–6^{(7–5)}, 6–2
Stuttgart Open; Stuttgart, Germany; ATP 250; Grass, outdoor 8 – 14 June 2015; Partner: (Spain) Feliciano López	–	QF	(Colombia) Juan Sebastián Cabal / (Colombia) Robert Farah Maksoud (5)	#28 / #33	Walkover	N/A
Stuttgart Open; Stuttgart, Germany; ATP 250; Grass, outdoor 8 – 14 June 2015; Partner: (Spain) Feliciano López	–	SF	(Austria) Alexander Peya / (Brazil) Bruno Soares	#15 / #13	Withdrew	N/A
Queen's Club Championships; London, United Kingdom; ATP 500; Grass, outdoor 15 – 21 June 2015; Partner: (Spain) Marc López
Queen's Club Championships; London, United Kingdom; ATP 500; Grass, outdoor 15 – 21 June 2015; Partner: (Spain) Marc López	11 / 178	1R	(Canada) Milos Raonic / (France) Édouard Roger-Vasselin	#826 / #19	Won	6–4, 6–4
Queen's Club Championships; London, United Kingdom; ATP 500; Grass, outdoor 15 – 21 June 2015; Partner: (Spain) Marc López	12 / 179	2R	(Canada) Daniel Nestor / (India) Leander Paes (3)	#23 / #24	Loss	6–7^{(3–7)}, 4–6
German Open; Hamburg, Germany; ATP 500; Clay, outdoor 27 June – 3 July 2015; Partner: (Spain) Jaume Munar
German Open; Hamburg, Germany; ATP 500; Clay, outdoor 27 June – 3 July 2015; Partner: (Spain) Jaume Munar	13 / 180	1R	(Italy) Simone Bolelli / (Italy) Fabio Fognini (1)	#11 / #7	Loss	4–6, 2–6
Canadian Open; Montreal, Canada; ATP 1000; Hard, outdoor 10 – 16 August 2015; Partner: (Spain) Fernando Verdasco
Canadian Open; Montreal, Canada; ATP 1000; Hard, outdoor 10 – 16 August 2015; Partner: (Spain) Fernando Verdasco	14 / 181	1R	(Czech Republic) Tomáš Berdych / (United States) Jack Sock	#564 / #18	Win	6–3, 5–7, [10–7]
Canadian Open; Montreal, Canada; ATP 1000; Hard, outdoor 10 – 16 August 2015; Partner: (Spain) Fernando Verdasco	15 / 182	2R	(France) Pierre-Hugues Herbert / (France) Nicolas Mahut (8)	#20 / #22	Win	7–6^{(10–8)}, 6–7^{(2–7)}, [10–4]
Canadian Open; Montreal, Canada; ATP 1000; Hard, outdoor 10 – 16 August 2015; Partner: (Spain) Fernando Verdasco	16 / 183	QF	(United States) Bob Bryan / (United States) Mike Bryan (1)	#1 / #1	Loss	3–6, 7–6^{(7–5)}, [8–10]
Davis Cup Group I Odense, Denmark; Davis Cup; Hard, indoor 18 – 20 September 2015; Partner: (Spain) Fernando Verdasco
Davis Cup Group I Odense, Denmark; Davis Cup; Hard, indoor 18 – 20 September 2015; Partner: (Spain) Fernando Verdasco	17 / 184	1R	(Denmark) Thomas Kromann / (Denmark) Frederik Nielsen	#none / #149	Win	6–4, 3–6, 7–6^{(7–4)}, 6–4
Swiss Indoors; Basel, Switzerland; ATP 500; Hard, indoor 26 October – 1 November 2015; Partner: (Spain) Marc López
Swiss Indoors; Basel, Switzerland; ATP 500; Hard, indoor 26 October – 1 November 2015; Partner: (Spain) Marc López	18 / 185	1R	(Croatia) Borna Ćorić / (Serbia) Viktor Troicki	#none / #161	Won	6–1, 4–6, [10–5]
Swiss Indoors; Basel, Switzerland; ATP 500; Hard, indoor 26 October – 1 November 2015; Partner: (Spain) Marc López	19 / 186	QF	(Netherlands) Jean-Julien Rojer / (Romania) Horia Tecău (2)	#5 / #4	Loss	5–7, 6–7^{(5–7)}
Paris Masters; Paris, France; ATP 1000; Hard, indoor 2 – 8 November 2015; Partner: (India) Leander Paes
Paris Masters; Paris, France; ATP 1000; Hard, indoor 2 – 8 November 2015; Partner: (India) Leander Paes	20 / 187	1R	(United Kingdom) Dominic Inglot / (Sweden) Robert Lindstedt	#29 / #23	Loss	3–6, 4–6

== Tournament schedule ==
=== Singles schedule ===
Nadal's 2015 singles tournament schedule is as follows: (Bolded letter indicates better or same result at the tournament)

Date	Tournament	Location	Category	Surface^{1}	Outcome 2014	Outcome 2015	Prev. Pts	New Pts^{2}
04 – 11 Jan 2015	Qatar Open	Doha, Qatar	250 Series	Hard	W	1R	250	0
19 Jan – 1 Feb 2015	Australian Open	Melbourne, Australia	Grand Slam	Hard	F	QF	1200	360
16 – 22 Feb 2015	Rio Open	Rio de Janeiro, Brazil	500 Series	Clay	**W**	SF	500	180
23 Feb – 1 March 2015	Argentina Open	Buenos Aires, Argentina	250 Series	Clay	DNS	**W**	0	250
9 – 22 March 2015	Indian Wells Masters	Indian Wells, United States	Masters 1000	Hard	3R	QF	45	180
25 March – 5 April 2015	Miami Open	Miami, United States	Masters 1000	Hard	F	3R	600	45
12 – 19 April 2015	Monte-Carlo Masters	Roquebrune-Cap-Martin, France	Masters 1000	Clay	QF	SF	180	360
20 – 26 April 2015	Barcelona Open	Barcelona, Spain	500 Series	Clay	QF	3R	90	45
3 – 10 May 2015	Madrid Open	Madrid, Spain	Masters 1000	Clay	**W**	F	1000	600
10 – 17 May 2015	Italian Open	Rome, Italy	Masters 1000	Clay	F	QF	600	180
24 May – 07 Jun 2015	French Open	Paris, France	Grand Slam	Clay	**W**	QF	2000	360
08 – 14 Jun 2015	Stuttgart Open	Stuttgart, Germany	250 Series	Grass	DNS	**W**	0	250
15 – 21 Jun 2015	Queen's Club Championships	London, United Kingdom	500 Series	Grass	DNS	1R	0	0
29 Jun – 12 Jul 2015	Wimbledon Championships	London, United Kingdom	Grand Slam	Grass	4R	2R	180	45
25 Jul – 02 Aug 2015	German Open	Hamburg, Germany	500 Series	Clay	DNS	**W**	0	500
10 – 16 Aug 2015	Canadian Open	Montreal, Canada	Masters 1000	Hard	DNS	QF	0	180
16 – 23 Aug 2015	Cincinnati Masters	Cincinnati, United States	Masters 1000	Hard	DNS	3R	0	90
31 Aug – 13 Sep 2015	US Open	New York City, United States	Grand Slam	Hard	DNS	3R	0	90
05 – 11 Oct 2015	China Open	Beijing, China	500 Series	Hard	QF	F	90	300
11 – 18 Oct 2015	Shanghai Masters	Shanghai, China	Masters 1000	Hard	2R	SF	10	360
26 Oct – 01 Nov 2015	Swiss Indoors	Basel, Switzerland	500 Series	Hard (i)	QF	F	90	300
02 – 08 Nov 2015	Paris Masters	Paris, France	Masters 1000	Hard (i)	DNS	QF	0	180
15 – 22 Nov 2015	ATP World Tour Finals	London, United Kingdom	ATP World Tour Finals	Hard (i)	DNS	SF	0	600
Total							6835	5230

^{1} The symbol (i) = indoors means that the respective tournament will be held indoors.

^{2} The ATP numbers between brackets = non-countable tournaments.

== Yearly records ==
=== Head-to-head matchups ===
Rafael Nadal has a 61–20 match win–loss record in the 2015 season. His record against players who were part of the ATP rankings Top Ten at the time of their meetings was 7–11. The following list is ordered by number of wins: (Bolded number marks a top 10 player at the time of match, Italic means top 30)

- (Spain) Nicolás Almagro 3–0
- (Switzerland) **Stan Wawrinka** 2–2
- (South Africa) Kevin Anderson 2–0
- (United States) John Isner 2–0
- (Uruguay) Pablo Cuevas 2–0
- (Brazil) Thomaz Bellucci 2–0 (Note: Belluci was ranked outside the top 50 for their first meeting (1–0) but top 50 for their second meeting (1–0).)
- (Russia) Mikhail Youzhny 2–0
- (United States) Jack Sock 2–0
- (Bulgaria) Grigor Dimitrov 2–0
- (Czech Republic) Lukáš Rosol 2–0
- (Spain) **David Ferrer** 2–0
- (Italy) Fabio Fognini 2–3
- (Croatia) Ivo Karlović 1–0
- (France) Richard Gasquet 1–0
- (France) Jérémy Chardy 1–0
- (Croatia) Borna Ćorić 1–0
- (Argentina) Diego Schwartzman 1–0
- (Ukraine) Sergiy Stakhovsky 1–0
- (United States) Tim Smyczek 1–0
- (Israel) Dudi Sela 1–0
- (Spain) Pablo Carreño Busta 1–0
- (Argentina) Facundo Arguello 1–0
- (Italy) Andreas Seppi 1–0
- (Argentina) Federico Delbonis 1–0
- (Argentina) Carlos Berlocq 1–0
- (Czech Republic) Jiří Veselý 1–0
- (Argentina) Juan Mónaco 1–0
- (Netherlands) Igor Sijsling 1–0
- (United States) Donald Young 1–0
- (France) Gilles Simon 1–0
- (France) Lucas Pouille 1–0
- (United States) Steve Johnson 1–0
- (Italy) Simone Bolelli 1–0
- (Turkey) Marsel İlhan 1–0
- (France) Quentin Halys 1–0
- (Russia) Andrey Kuznetsov 1–0
- (Canada) Vasek Pospisil 1–0
- (China) Wu Di 1–0
- (Cyprus) Marcos Baghdatis 1–0
- (Australia) Bernard Tomic 1–0
- (France) Gaël Monfils 1–0
- (Serbia) Viktor Troicki 1–0
- (Denmark) Mikael Torpegaard 1–0
- (Croatia) Marin Čilić 1–0
- (United Kingdom) **Andy Murray** 1–1
- (Czech Republic) **Tomáš Berdych** 1–1
- (Canada) **Milos Raonic** 1–1
- (Spain) Fernando Verdasco 1–1
- (France) Jo-Wilfried Tsonga 0–1
- (Spain) Feliciano López 0–1
- (Germany) Michael Berrer 0–1
- (Ukraine) Alexandr Dolgopolov 0–1
- (Germany) Dustin Brown 0–1
- (Japan) **Kei Nishikori** 0–1
- (Switzerland) **Roger Federer** 0–1
- (Serbia) **Novak Djokovic** 0–4

=== Finals ===
==== Singles: 6 (3–3) ====
Category Grand Slam (0–0) ATP World Tour Finals (0–0) ATP World Tour Masters 1000 (0–1) ATP World Tour 500 (1–2) ATP World Tour 250 (2–0)	Titles by Surface Hard (0–2) Clay (2–1) Grass (1–0)	Titles by Location Outdoors (3–2) Indoors (0–1)

Result	No.	Date	Category	Tournament	Surface	Opponent	Score
Winner	65.	March 1, 2015	250 Series	Argentina Open, Buenos Aires, Argentina	Clay	(Argentina) Juan Mónaco	6–4, 6–1
Runner-up	29.	May 10, 2015	Masters 1000	Madrid Open, Madrid, Spain	Clay	(United Kingdom) Andy Murray	3–6, 2–6
Winner	66.	June 14, 2015	250 Series	Stuttgart Open, Stuttgart, Germany	Grass	(Serbia) Viktor Troicki	7–6^{(7–3)}, 6–3
Winner	67.	August 2, 2015	500 Series	German Open, Hamburg, Germany (2)	Clay	(Italy) Fabio Fognini	7–5, 7–5
Runner-up	30.	October 11, 2015	500 Series	China Open, Beijing, China	Hard	(Serbia) Novak Djokovic	2–6, 2–6
Runner-up	31.	November 1, 2015	500 Series	Swiss Indoors, Basel, Switzerland	Hard (i)	(Switzerland) Roger Federer	3–6, 7–5, 3–6

==== Doubles: 1 (1–0) ====
Legend Grand Slam tournaments (0–0) Year-End Championships (0–0) ATP World Tour Masters 1000 (0–0) ATP World Tour 500 Series (0–0) ATP World Tour 250 Series (1–0)	Titles by Surface Hard (1–0) Clay (0–0) Grass (0–0)	Titles by Location Outdoors (1–0) Indoors (0–0)

Result	No.	Date	Category	Tournament	Surface	Partner	Opponents	Score
Winner	9.	January 9, 2015	250 Series	Qatar Open, Doha, Qatar (4)	Hard	(Argentina) Juan Mónaco	(Austria) Julian Knowle (Austria) Philipp Oswald	6–3, 6–4

=== Earnings ===
- **Bold** font denotes tournament win

#	Venue	Singles Prize Money	Year-to-date
1.	2015 Qatar ExxonMobil Open	$42,275	$42,275
2.	2015 Australian Open	A$340,000	$308,291
3.	2015 Rio Open	$73,240	$381,531
4.	**2015 Argentina Open**	**$93,305**	**$474,836**
5.	2015 Indian Wells Masters	$130,655	$605,491
6.	2015 Miami Open	$31,670	$637,161
7.	2015 Monte-Carlo Rolex Masters	€155,000	$762,785
8.	2015 Barcelona Open Banc Sabadell	€22,565	$787,157
9.	2015 Mutua Madrid Open	€392,000	$1,225,923
10.	2015 Internazionali BNL d'Italia	€78,820	$1,314,186
11.	2015 French Open	€250,000	$1,564,186
12.	**2015 MercedesCup**	**€104,600**	**$1,705,561**
13.	2015 Aegon Championships	€11,035	$1,717,990
14.	2015 Wimbledon	£47,000	$1,791,955
15.	**2015 International German Open**	**€311,755**	**$2,134,127**
16.	2015 Rogers Cup	$85,985	$2,220,112
17.	2015 Western & Southern Open	$47,625	$2,267,737
18.	2015 US Open	$120,200	$2,387,937
19.	2015 China Open	$295,180	$2,683,117
20.	2015 Shanghai Masters	$225,460	$2,908,577
21.	2015 Swiss Indoors	€172,200	$3,098,289
22.	2015 Paris Masters	€82,030	$3,188,513
23.	2015 ATP World Tour Finals	$668,000	$3,943,888

== See also ==
- 2015 ATP World Tour
- 2015 Novak Djokovic tennis season
- 2015 Roger Federer tennis season
- 2015 Andy Murray tennis season
- 2015 Stan Wawrinka tennis season
