= 2014 MercedesCup – Singles =

Singles
- 2014 MercedesCup

Final
- Champion: (Spain) Roberto Bautista Agut
- Runner-up: (Czech Republic) Lukáš Rosol
- Score: 6–3, 4–6, 6–2

Details
- Draw: 28
- Seeds: 8

Events
Singles	Doubles
- Stuttgart Open

Fabio Fognini was the defending champion, but lost in the semifinals to Roberto Bautista Agut.
Third-seeded Bautista Agut went on to win the title, defeating Lukáš Rosol in the final, 6–3, 4–6, 6–2.

== Seeds ==
The top four seeds receive a bye into the second round.

1. (Italy) Fabio Fognini (semifinals)
2. (Russia) Mikhail Youzhny (semifinals)
3. (Spain) Roberto Bautista Agut (champion)
4. (Spain) Feliciano López (quarterfinals)
5. (Germany) Philipp Kohlschreiber (second round)
6. (Spain) Guillermo García López (quarterfinals)
7. (Colombia) Santiago Giraldo (quarterfinals)
8. (Argentina) Federico Delbonis (quarterfinals)

== Draw ==
Key

- Q = Qualifier
- WC = Wild card
- LL = Lucky loser
- Alt = Alternate
- ITF = ITF entry
- PR = Protected ranking
- SR = Special ranking
- SE = Special exempt
- JE = Junior exempt
- JR = Junior Accelerator Programme entrant
- CO = College Accelerator Programme entrant
- NG = Next Gen Accelerator Program entrant
- w/o = Walkover
- r = Retired
- d = Defaulted

=== Finals ===
Semifinals
1	(Italy) Fabio Fognini	3	4
3	(Spain) Roberto Bautista Agut	6	6
(Czech Republic) Lukáš Rosol	7^{7}	6
2	(Russia) Mikhail Youzhny	6^{3}	2

Final
3	(Spain) Roberto Bautista Agut	6	4	6
(Czech Republic) Lukáš Rosol	3	6	2

=== Top half ===
First round
(Kazakhstan) A Golubev	6	6
WC	(Germany) P Petzschner	4	1
Q	(Russia) P Davydenko	6	7^{10}
(Slovenia) B Rola	4	6^{8}
Q	(Croatia) M Delić	4	2
7	(Colombia) S Giraldo	6	6
(Netherlands) I Sijsling	4	1
LL	(Republic of Ireland) L Sorensen	6	6
Q	(Switzerland) Y Marti	7	6
LL	(Switzerland) H Laaksonen	5	4
Q	(Italy) M Cecchinato	4	6	5
6	(Spain) G García López	6	1	7

Second round
1	(Italy) F Fognini	6	6
(Kazakhstan) A Golubev	4	4
Q	(Russia) P Davydenko	1	7^{7}	3
7	(Colombia) S Giraldo	6	6^{5}	6
3	(Spain) R Bautista Agut	6	1	6
LL	(Republic of Ireland) L Sorensen	3	6	1
Q	(Switzerland) Y Marti	6^{13}	5
6	(Spain) G García López	7^{15}	7

Quarterfinals
1	(Italy) F Fognini	6	6
7	(Colombia) S Giraldo	4	3
3	(Spain) R Bautista Agut	3	6	7^{7}
6	(Spain) G García López	6	4	6^{1}

Semifinals
1	(Italy) F Fognini	3	4
3	(Spain) R Bautista Agut	6	6

=== Bottom half ===
First round
5	(Germany) P Kohlschreiber	6	6
(Germany) J-L Struff	4	3
(Czech Republic) L Rosol	7^{9}	7^{11}
WC	(Germany) A Zverev	6^{7}	6^{9}
(Germany) P Gojowczyk	5	3
(Spain) D Gimeno Traver	7	6
8	(Argentina) F Delbonis	6	6
(Argentina) J Mónaco	4	1
(Germany) B Becker	3	6	6
(France) B Paire	6	2	2
(Argentina) L Mayer	2	6	7^{7}
WC	(Germany) M Berrer	6	3	6^{5}

Second round
5	(Germany) P Kohlschreiber	5	6^{5}
(Czech Republic) L Rosol	7	7^{7}
(Spain) D Gimeno Traver	7^{7}	2	3
4	(Spain) F López	6^{3}	6	6
8	(Argentina) F Delbonis	6^{6}	6	6
(Germany) B Becker	7^{8}	4	4
(Argentina) L Mayer	1	1
2	(Russia) M Youzhny	6	6

Quarterfinals
(Czech Republic) L Rosol	4	6	7^{7}
4	(Spain) F López	6	3	6^{4}
8	(Argentina) F Delbonis	6^{2}	2
2	(Russia) M Youzhny	7^{7}	6

Semifinals
(Czech Republic) L Rosol	7^{7}	6
2	(Russia) M Youzhny	6^{3}	2

== Qualifying ==
=== Seeds ===
1. (Argentina) Facundo Bagnis (first round)
2. (Italy) Marco Cecchinato (qualified)
3. (Turkey) Marsel İlhan (second round)
4. (Portugal) Gastão Elias (first round)
5. (Croatia) Mate Delić (qualified)
6. (Republic of Ireland) Louk Sorensen (qualifying competition, Lucky loser)
7. (Switzerland) Yann Marti (qualified)
8. (Germany) Matthias Bachinger (first round)

=== Qualifiers ===
1. (Russia) Philipp Davydenko
2. (Italy) Marco Cecchinato
3. (Switzerland) Yann Marti
4. (Croatia) Mate Delić

=== Lucky losers ===
1. (Republic of Ireland) Louk Sorensen
2. (Switzerland) Henri Laaksonen

=== Qualifying draw ===
==== First qualifier ====
First round
1	(Argentina) Facundo Bagnis	4	6	3
(Russia) Philipp Davydenko	6	3	6
(Russia) Alexander Lobkov	6	6
WC	(Germany) Sebastian Buehler	0	0
(Croatia) Duje Kekez	7^{7}	1	6
(Colombia) Juan Carlos Spir	6^{4}	6	4
(Brazil) Marcelo Demoliner	7^{7}	1	6^{6}
6	(Republic of Ireland) Louk Sorensen	6^{4}	6	7^{8}

Second round
(Russia) Philipp Davydenko	6	6
(Russia) Alexander Lobkov	3	0
(Croatia) Duje Kekez	5	5
6	(Republic of Ireland) Louk Sorensen	7	7

Qualifying competition
(Russia) Philipp Davydenko	6	6
6	(Republic of Ireland) Louk Sorensen	2	3

==== Second qualifier ====
First round
2	(Italy) Marco Cecchinato	6	6
(Italy) Matteo Trevisan	0	2
(Croatia) Mate Pavić	7	6
(Slovakia) Pavol Červenák	5	2
(Russia) Kirill Dmitriev	4	4
(Austria) Nicolas Reissig	6	6
(Slovakia) Adrian Sikora	6	6
8	(Germany) Matthias Bachinger	4	2

Second round
2	(Italy) Marco Cecchinato	6	6
(Croatia) Mate Pavić	3	2
(Austria) Nicolas Reissig	3	6	4
(Slovakia) Adrian Sikora	6	3	6

Qualifying competition
2	(Italy) Marco Cecchinato	6	4	6
(Slovakia) Adrian Sikora	1	6	3

==== Third qualifier ====
First round
3	(Turkey) Marsel İlhan	6	6
(Germany) Jonas Lütjen	2	4
(Germany) Robin Kern	7^{7}	7^{8}
(Colombia) Nicolás Barrientos	6^{3}	6^{6}
WC	(Germany) Jan Choinski	6	6
(Spain) David Estruch	3	3
(Switzerland) Sandro Ehrat	3	2
7	(Switzerland) Yann Marti	6	6

Second round
3	(Turkey) Marsel İlhan	3	6^{4}
(Germany) Robin Kern	6	7^{7}
WC	(Germany) Jan Choinski	2	7^{7}	2
7	(Switzerland) Yann Marti	6	6^{4}	6

Qualifying competition
(Germany) Robin Kern	2	3
7	(Switzerland) Yann Marti	6	6

==== Fourth qualifier ====
First round
4	(Portugal) Gastão Elias	3	4
WC	(Germany) Yannick Hanfmann	6	6
WC	(Turkmenistan) Isa Mammetgulyyev	0	2
(Switzerland) Henri Laaksonen	6	6
(Argentina) Matías Castro	0	1
(Serbia) Peđa Krstin	6	6
(Brazil) João Pedro Sorgi	1	2
5	(Croatia) Mate Delić	6	6

Second round
WC	(Germany) Yannick Hanfmann	6	1	2
(Switzerland) Henri Laaksonen	4	6	6
(Serbia) Peđa Krstin	4	2
5	(Croatia) Mate Delić	6	6

Qualifying competition
(Switzerland) Henri Laaksonen	3	6	4
5	(Croatia) Mate Delić	6	1	6
