= 2014 MercedesCup – Doubles =

Doubles
- 2014 MercedesCup

Final
- Champion: (Poland) Mateusz Kowalczyk (New Zealand) Artem Sitak
- Runner-up: (Spain) Guillermo García-López (Austria) Philipp Oswald
- Score: 2–6, 6–1, [10–7]

Details
- Draw: 16
- Seeds: 4

Events
Singles	Doubles
← 2013 ·	Stuttgart Open	· 2015 →

Facundo Bagnis and Thomaz Bellucci were the defending champions, but Bellucci chose not to participate. Bagnis played alongside Marco Cecchinato, but lost in the first round to Michael Berrer and Alexander Zverev.
Mateusz Kowalczyk and Artem Sitak won the title, defeating Guillermo García-López and Philipp Oswald in the final, 2–6, 6–1, [10–7].

== Seeds ==
1. (United Kingdom) Colin Fleming / (Poland) Mariusz Fyrstenberg (first round)
2. (Croatia) Marin Draganja / (Romania) Florin Mergea (quarterfinals)
3. (Czech Republic) František Čermák / (Czech Republic) Lukáš Rosol (quarterfinals)
4. (Croatia) Mate Pavić / (Brazil) André Sá (quarterfinals)

== Draw ==
=== Key ===
- Q = Qualifier
- WC = Wild card
- LL = Lucky loser
- Alt = Alternate
- SE = Special exempt
- PR = Protected ranking
- ITF = ITF entry
- JE = Junior exempt
- w/o = Walkover
- r = Retired
- d = Defaulted
- SR = Special ranking

=== Draw ===
First round
1	(United Kingdom) C Fleming (Poland) M Fyrstenberg	2	2
(Spain) G García-López (Austria) P Oswald	6	6
(Kazakhstan) A Golubev (Slovakia) M Mertiňák	6^{0}	6	[8]
(Brazil) M Demoliner (India) P Raja	7^{7}	4	[10]
4	(Croatia) M Pavić (Brazil) A Sá	6	6
WC	(Germany) R Kern (Austria) N Reissig	4	1
(Italy) F Fognini (Argentina) J Mónaco	3	1
Alt	(Germany) P Gojowczyk (Germany) D Meffert	6	6
(Argentina) F Bagnis (Italy) M Cecchinato	4	3
WC	(Germany) M Berrer (Germany) A Zverev	6	6
(Argentina) F Delbonis (Argentina) L Mayer	3	6	[4]
3	(Czech Republic) F Čermák (Czech Republic) L Rosol	6	4	[10]
(Poland) M Kowalczyk (New Zealand) A Sitak	6	6
(Colombia) N Barrientos (Colombia) JC Spir	4	3
(Germany) B Becker (Germany) J-L Struff	5	6	[8]
2	(Croatia) M Draganja (Romania) F Mergea	7	3	[10]

Quarterfinals
(Spain) G García-López (Austria) P Oswald	6	6
(Brazil) M Demoliner (India) P Raja	4	4
4	(Croatia) M Pavić (Brazil) A Sá	4	2
Alt	(Germany) P Gojowczyk (Germany) D Meffert	6	6
WC	(Germany) M Berrer (Germany) A Zverev	2	6	[10]
3	(Czech Republic) F Čermák (Czech Republic) L Rosol	6	3	[4]
(Poland) M Kowalczyk (New Zealand) A Sitak	2	7^{7}	[10]
2	(Croatia) M Draganja (Romania) F Mergea	6	6^{3}	[6]

Semifinals
(Spain) G García-López (Austria) P Oswald	7	4	[10]
Alt	(Germany) P Gojowczyk (Germany) D Meffert	5	6	[8]
WC	(Germany) M Berrer (Germany) A Zverev	3	0
(Poland) M Kowalczyk (New Zealand) A Sitak	6	6

Final
(Spain) G García-López (Austria) P Oswald	6	1	[7]
(Poland) M Kowalczyk (New Zealand) A Sitak	2	6	[10]
