= 2015 German Open – Doubles =

Doubles
- 2015 German Open

Final
- Champions: (United Kingdom) Jamie Murray (Australia) John Peers
- Runners-up: (Colombia) Juan Sebastián Cabal (Colombia) Robert Farah
- Score: 2–6, 6–3, [10–8]

Details
- Draw: 16
- Seeds: 4

Events
Singles	Doubles
- German Open Tennis Championships

Marin Draganja and Florin Mergea were the defending champions, but Mergea decided not to participate this year. Draganja paired up with Henri Kontinen, but lost in the first round to Martin Kližan and Lukáš Rosol.
Jamie Murray and John Peers won the title, defeating Juan Sebastián Cabal and Robert Farah in the final, 2–6, 6–3, [10–8].

== Seeds ==
1. (Italy) Simone Bolelli / (Italy) Fabio Fognini (semifinals, withdrew)
2. (Austria) Alexander Peya / (Brazil) Bruno Soares (semifinals)
3. (United Kingdom) Jamie Murray / (Australia) John Peers (champions)
4. (Uruguay) Pablo Cuevas / (Spain) David Marrero (quarterfinals)

== Draw ==
Key

- Q = Qualifier
- WC = Wild card
- LL = Lucky loser
- Alt = Alternate
- ITF = ITF entry
- PR = Protected ranking
- SR = Special ranking
- SE = Special exempt
- JE = Junior exempt
- JR = Junior Accelerator Programme entrant
- CO = College Accelerator Programme entrant
- NG = Next Gen Accelerator Program entrant
- w/o = Walkover
- r = Retired
- d = Defaulted

=== Draw ===
First round
1	(Italy) S Bolelli (Italy) F Fognini	6	6
WC	(Spain) J Munar (Spain) R Nadal	4	2
(Spain) G García López (Spain) F Verdasco	4	6	[10]
(United Kingdom) D Inglot (Sweden) R Lindstedt	6	4	[8]
3	(United Kingdom) J Murray (Australia) J Peers	7^{7}	6
PR	(Germany) F Mayer (Czech Republic) J Veselý	6^{5}	2
Q	(Germany) F Moser (Germany) J-L Struff	6	6
(Spain) A Ramos Viñolas (Italy) A Seppi	3	4
WC	(Germany) P Kohlschreiber (Germany) P Petzschner	1	6^{3}
(Colombia) JS Cabal (Colombia) R Farah	6	7^{7}
PR	(Spain) N Almagro (Argentina) D Schwartzman	5	4
4	(Uruguay) P Cuevas (Spain) D Marrero	7	6
(Croatia) M Draganja (Finland) H Kontinen	4	2
(Slovakia) M Kližan (Czech Republic) L Rosol	6	6
(France) J Chardy (Poland) Ł Kubot	3	5
2	(Austria) A Peya (Brazil) B Soares	6	7

Quarterfinals
1	(Italy) S Bolelli (Italy) F Fognini	w/o
(Spain) G García López (Spain) F Verdasco
3	(United Kingdom) J Murray (Australia) J Peers	6	6
Q	(Germany) F Moser (Germany) J-L Struff	3	4
(Colombia) JS Cabal (Colombia) R Farah	6	6
4	(Uruguay) P Cuevas (Spain) D Marrero	4	2
(Slovakia) M Kližan (Czech Republic) L Rosol	3	4
2	(Austria) A Peya (Brazil) B Soares	6	6

Semifinals
1	(Italy) S Bolelli (Italy) F Fognini
3	(United Kingdom) J Murray (Australia) J Peers	w/o
(Colombia) JS Cabal (Colombia) R Farah	3	6	[10]
2	(Austria) A Peya (Brazil) B Soares	6	1	[6]

Final
3	(United Kingdom) J Murray (Australia) J Peers	2	6	[10]
(Colombia) JS Cabal (Colombia) R Farah	6	3	[8]

== Qualifying ==
=== Seeds ===
1. (Sweden) Johan Brunström / (Canada) Adil Shamasdin (first round)
2. (Germany) Frank Moser / (Germany) Jan-Lennard Struff (qualified)

=== Qualifiers ===
1. (Germany) Frank Moser / (Germany) Jan-Lennard Struff

=== Qualifying draw ===
First round
1	(Sweden) Johan Brunström (Canada) Adil Shamasdin	6^{6}	5
(Argentina) Carlos Berlocq (Argentina) Renzo Olivo	7^{8}	7
(Bosnia and Herzegovina) Damir Džumhur (Poland) Mateusz Kowalczyk	5	6^{3}
2	(Germany) Frank Moser (Germany) Jan-Lennard Struff	7	7^{7}

Qualifying competition
(Argentina) Carlos Berlocq (Argentina) Renzo Olivo	3	5
2	(Germany) Frank Moser (Germany) Jan-Lennard Struff	6	7
