= 2015 MercedesCup =

- Date: 8–14 June
- Edition: 38th
- Category: ATP World Tour 250 series
- Draw: 28S / 16D
- Prize money: €574,965
- Surface: Grass
- Location: Stuttgart, Germany
- Venue: Tennis Club Weissenhof

Champions

Singles
- (Spain) Rafael Nadal

Doubles
- (India) Rohan Bopanna / (Romania) Florin Mergea
| ← 2014 · | MercedesCup | · 2016 → |

The 2015 MercedesCup was a men's tennis tournament played on grass courts. It was the 38th edition of the Stuttgart Open, and part of the ATP World Tour 250 series of the 2015 ATP World Tour. It was held at the Tennis Club Weissenhof in Stuttgart, Germany, from 8 June until 14 June 2015. This was the first year that the tournament was held on grass courts. First-seeded Rafael Nadal won the singles title.

== Finals ==
=== Singles ===
- (Spain) Rafael Nadal defeated (Serbia) Viktor Troicki, 7–6^{(7–3)}, 6–3

=== Doubles ===
- (India) Rohan Bopanna / (Romania) Florin Mergea defeated (Austria) Alexander Peya / (Brazil) Bruno Soares, 5–7, 6–2, [10–7]

== Singles main-draw entrants ==
=== Seeds ===
| Country | Player | Rank^{1} | Seed |
|---|---|---|---|
| ESP | Rafael Nadal | 7 | 1 |
| CRO | Marin Čilić | 10 | 2 |
| ESP | Feliciano López | 12 | 3 |
| FRA | Gaël Monfils | 14 | 4 |
| AUS | Bernard Tomic | 26 | 5 |
| GER | Philipp Kohlschreiber | 28 | 6 |
| AUT | Dominic Thiem | 31 | 7 |
| SRB | Viktor Troicki | 33 | 8 |

- ^{1} Rankings are as of May 25, 2015

=== Other entrants ===
The following players received wildcards into the singles main draw:

- (Germany) Tommy Haas
- (Germany) Maximilian Marterer
- (Germany) Alexander Zverev

The following players received entry from the qualifying draw:

- (Germany) Dustin Brown
- (Germany) Peter Gojowczyk
- (Croatia) Mate Pavić
- (Germany) Mischa Zverev

The following player received entry as a lucky loser:

- (Germany) Matthias Bachinger

=== Withdrawals ===
Before the tournament

- (France) Julien Benneteau →replaced by Jan-Lennard Struff
- (Czech Republic) Radek Štěpánek →replaced by Matthias Bachinger
- (Czech Republic) Jiří Veselý →replaced by Sam Groth

=== Retirements ===
- (Ukraine) Sergiy Stakhovsky (back injury)

== Doubles main-draw entrants ==
=== Seeds ===
| Country | Player | Country | Player | Rank^{1} | Seed |
|---|---|---|---|---|---|
| ~~USA~~ | ~~Bob Bryan~~ | ~~USA~~ | ~~Mike Bryan~~ | ~~2~~ | ~~1~~ |
| POL | Marcin Matkowski | SRB | Nenad Zimonjić | 33 | 2 |
| AUT | Alexander Peya | BRA | Bruno Soares | 33 | 3 |
| IND | Rohan Bopanna | ROU | Florin Mergea | 34 | 4 |
| COL | Juan Sebastián Cabal | COL | Robert Farah | 61 | 5 |

- Rankings are as of May 25, 2015

=== Other entrants ===
The following pairs received wildcards into the doubles main draw:

- (Germany) Andreas Beck / (Germany) Michael Berrer
- (Germany) Philipp Petzschner / (Germany) Jan-Lennard Struff

The following pairs received entry as alternates:

- (Croatia) Borna Ćorić / (Croatia) Ante Pavić
- (Australia) Rameez Junaid / (Canada) Adil Shamasdin
- (Czech Republic) Lukáš Rosol / (Austria) Dominic Thiem

=== Withdrawals ===
Before the tournament

- (United States) Mike Bryan (stomach pain)
- (Ukraine) Sergiy Stakhovsky (back injury)
- (Czech Republic) Radek Štěpánek (back injury)

During the tournament

- (Colombia) Robert Farah (wrist injury)
- (Spain) Rafael Nadal (fatigue)
