= 2015 MercedesCup – Doubles =

Doubles
- 2015 MercedesCup

Final
- Champion: (India) Rohan Bopanna (Romania) Florin Mergea
- Runner-up: (Austria) Alexander Peya (Brazil) Bruno Soares
- Score: 5–7, 6–2, [10–7]

Details
- Draw: 16
- Seeds: 4

Events
Singles	Doubles
← 2014 ·	Stuttgart Open	· 2016 →

Mateusz Kowalczyk and Artem Sitak were the defending champions, but chose not to participate this year.

Rohan Bopanna and Florin Mergea won the title, defeating Alexander Peya and Bruno Soares in the final 5–7, 6–2, [10–7].

== Seeds ==
1. (United States) Bob Bryan / (United States) Mike Bryan (withdrew)
2. (Poland) Marcin Matkowski / (Serbia) Nenad Zimonjić (semifinals)
3. (Austria) Alexander Peya / (Brazil) Bruno Soares (final)
4. (India) Rohan Bopanna / (Romania) Florin Mergea (champions)
5. (Colombia) Juan Sebastián Cabal / (Colombia) Robert Farah (quarterfinals, withdrew)

== Draw ==
=== Key ===
- Q = Qualifier
- WC = Wild card
- LL = Lucky loser
- Alt = Alternate
- SE = Special exempt
- PR = Protected ranking
- ITF = ITF entry
- JE = Junior exempt
- w/o = Walkover
- r = Retired
- d = Defaulted
- SR = Special ranking

=== Draw ===
First round
5/Alt	(Colombia) JS Cabal (Colombia) R Farah	7^{7}	7^{7}
Alt	(Czech Republic) L Rosol (Austria) D Thiem	6^{5}	6^{5}
(Spain) F López (Spain) R Nadal	7^{7}	6
Alt	(Australia) R Junaid (Canada) A Shamasdin	6^{5}	2
3	(Austria) A Peya (Brazil) B Soares	6	6
WC	(Germany) P Petzschner (Germany) J-L Struff	2	3
WC	(Germany) A Beck (Germany) M Berrer	6^{4}	2
(Germany) A Begemann (Austria) J Knowle	7^{7}	6
(Italy) A Seppi (Serbia) V Troicki	4	6	[6]
(Croatia) M Pavić (New Zealand) M Venus	6	3	[10]
(Croatia) M Čilić (Germany) F Moser	3	6^{10}
4	(India) R Bopanna (Romania) F Mergea	6	7^{12}
Alt	(Croatia) B Ćorić (Croatia) A Pavić	6^{4}	6^{5}
(Germany) D Brown (Austria) A Haider-Maurer	7^{7}	7^{7}
(France) G Monfils (France) G Simon	3	4
2	(Poland) M Matkowski (Serbia) N Zimonjić	6	6

Quarterfinals
5	(Colombia) JS Cabal (Colombia) R Farah
(Spain) F López (Spain) R Nadal	w/o
3	(Austria) A Peya (Brazil) B Soares	6	6
(Germany) A Begemann (Austria) J Knowle	4	4
(Croatia) M Pavić (New Zealand) M Venus	6^{5}	2
4	(India) R Bopanna (Romania) F Mergea	7^{7}	6
(Germany) D Brown (Austria) A Haider-Maurer	6^{6}	2
2	(Poland) M Matkowski (Serbia) N Zimonjić	7^{8}	6

Semifinals
(Spain) F López (Spain) R Nadal
3	(Austria) A Peya (Brazil) B Soares	w/o
4	(India) R Bopanna (Romania) F Mergea	6	6^{6}	[10]
2	(Poland) M Matkowski (Serbia) N Zimonjić	3	7^{8}	[7]

Final
3	(Austria) A Peya (Brazil) B Soares	7	2	[7]
4	(India) R Bopanna (Romania) F Mergea	5	6	[10]
