= 2015 German Open – Singles =

Singles
- 2015 German Open

Final
- Champion: (Spain) Rafael Nadal
- Runner-up: (Italy) Fabio Fognini
- Score: 7–5, 7–5

Details
- Draw: 32
- Seeds: 8

Events
Singles	Doubles
- German Open Tennis Championships

Leonardo Mayer was the defending singles champion, but chose not to participate this year.

First-seeded Rafael Nadal won the title, defeating Fabio Fognini in the final 7–5, 7–5.

== Seeds ==
1. (Spain) Rafael Nadal (champion)
2. (Spain) Tommy Robredo (second round)
3. (Spain) Roberto Bautista Agut (second round)
4. (Italy) Andreas Seppi (semifinals)
5. (Uruguay) Pablo Cuevas (quarterfinals)
6. (Argentina) Juan Mónaco (second round)
7. (Spain) Guillermo García-López (first round, retired)
8. (Italy) Fabio Fognini (final)

== Draw ==
Key

- Q = Qualifier
- WC = Wild card
- LL = Lucky loser
- Alt = Alternate
- ITF = ITF entry
- PR = Protected ranking
- SR = Special ranking
- SE = Special exempt
- JE = Junior exempt
- JR = Junior Accelerator Programme entrant
- CO = College Accelerator Programme entrant
- NG = Next Gen Accelerator Program entrant
- w/o = Walkover
- r = Retired
- d = Defaulted

=== Finals ===
Semifinals
1/WC	(Spain) Rafael Nadal	6	6
4	(Italy) Andreas Seppi	1	2
8	(Italy) Fabio Fognini	6	7^{7}
Q	(France) Lucas Pouille	2	6^{2}

Final
1/WC	(Spain) Rafael Nadal	7	7
8	(Italy) Fabio Fognini	5	5

=== Top half ===
First round
1/WC	(Spain) R Nadal	3	6	6
(Spain) F Verdasco	6	1	1
(Czech Republic) J Veselý	3	6	6
(Austria) A Haider-Maurer	6	1	0
Q	(Japan) T Daniel	4	3
(Poland) J Janowicz	6	6
(Argentina) D Schwartzman	6^{4}	4
5	(Uruguay) P Cuevas	7^{7}	6
4	(Italy) A Seppi	6	6
(Slovakia) M Kližan	2	4
WC	(Germany) F Mayer	4	6	6
Q	(Spain) A Montañés	6	2	2
(Czech Republic) L Rosol	6^{3}	6^{6}
(Italy) S Bolelli	7^{7}	7^{8}
WC	(Spain) J Munar	1
7	(Spain) G García-López	2^{r}

Second round
1/WC	(Spain) R Nadal	6	7^{7}
(Czech Republic) J Veselý	4	6^{2}
(Poland) J Janowicz	3	6	2
5	(Uruguay) P Cuevas	6	4	6
4	(Italy) A Seppi	4	6	6
WC	(Germany) F Mayer	6	2	3
(Italy) S Bolelli	6	6^{5}	6
WC	(Spain) J Munar	1	7^{7}	4

Quarterfinals
1/WC	(Spain) R Nadal	6	6
5	(Uruguay) P Cuevas	3	2
4	(Italy) A Seppi	w/o
(Italy) S Bolelli

Semifinals
1/WC	(Spain) R Nadal	6	6
4	(Italy) A Seppi	1	2

=== Bottom half ===
First round
8	(Italy) F Fognini	6	6^{5}	6
(France) J Chardy	3	7^{7}	4
PR	(Spain) N Almagro	4	6^{3}
(Spain) A Ramos	6	7^{7}
(United Kingdom) A Bedene	6	6
(Spain) D Gimeno-Traver	4	1
(Croatia) B Ćorić	3	4
3	(Spain) R Bautista Agut	6	6
6	(Argentina) J Mónaco	6	6^{5}	6
(Latvia) E Gulbis	3	7^{7}	3
Q	(Spain) I Cervantes	6^{2}	4
Q	(France) L Pouille	7^{7}	6
(France) B Paire	6	3	6
(Germany) P Kohlschreiber	3	6	1
WC	(Germany) A Zverev	7^{7}	4	2
2	(Spain) T Robredo	6^{3}	6	6

Second round
8	(Italy) F Fognini	6	3	6
(Spain) A Ramos	2	6	3
(United Kingdom) A Bedene	7^{7}	7^{9}
3	(Spain) R Bautista Agut	6^{2}	6^{7}
6	(Argentina) J Mónaco	1	5
Q	(France) L Pouille	6	7
(France) B Paire	2	6	7
2	(Spain) T Robredo	6	3	5

Quarterfinals
8	(Italy) F Fognini	6	7
(United Kingdom) A Bedene	4	5
Q	(France) L Pouille	6	6
(France) B Paire	3	2

Semifinals
8	(Italy) F Fognini	6	7^{7}
Q	(France) L Pouille	2	6^{2}

== Qualifying ==
=== Seeds ===
1. (France) Lucas Pouille (qualified)
2. (Italy) Marco Cecchinato (first round)
3. (Bosnia and Herzegovina) Damir Džumhur (first round)
4. (Spain) Albert Montañés (qualified)
5. (Germany) Matthias Bachinger (first round)
6. (Germany) Jan-Lennard Struff (first round)
7. (Japan) Taro Daniel (qualified)
8. (Spain) Daniel Muñoz de la Nava (first round)

=== Qualifiers ===
1. (France) Lucas Pouille
2. (Japan) Taro Daniel
3. (Spain) Íñigo Cervantes
4. (Spain) Albert Montañés

=== Qualifying draw ===
==== First qualifier ====
First round
1	(France) Lucas Pouille	3	6	6
(Argentina) Carlos Berlocq	6	1	3
(Argentina) Renzo Olivo	7^{7}	6
6	(Germany) Jan-Lennard Struff	6^{4}	3

Second round
1	(France) Lucas Pouille	5	6	6
(Argentina) Renzo Olivo	7	2	2

==== Second qualifier ====
First round
2	(Italy) Marco Cecchinato	3	6^{3}
WC	(Germany) Maximilian Marterer	6	7^{7}
WC	(Germany) Daniel Masur	2	4
7	(Japan) Taro Daniel	6	6

Second round
WC	(Germany) Maximilian Marterer	3	1
7	(Japan) Taro Daniel	6	6

==== Third qualifier ====
First round
3	(Bosnia and Herzegovina) Damir Džumhur	6	3	4
(Slovakia) Norbert Gombos	3	6	6
(Spain) Íñigo Cervantes	6	3	6
8	(Spain) Daniel Muñoz de la Nava	4	6	3

Second round
(Slovakia) Norbert Gombos	4	4
(Spain) Íñigo Cervantes	6	6

==== Fourth qualifier ====
First round
4	(Spain) Albert Montañés	6	6
(Italy) Luca Vanni	3	4
WC	(Germany) Mischa Zverev	1	6	6
5	(Germany) Matthias Bachinger	6	3	4

Second round
4	(Spain) Albert Montañés	6	2	6
WC	(Germany) Mischa Zverev	0	6	4
