= 2015 German Open =

- Date: 27 July – 2 August
- Edition: 109th
- Category: ATP World Tour 500
- Draw: 32S / 16D
- Prize money: €1,285,955
- Surface: Clay / outdoor
- Location: Hamburg, Germany
- Venue: Am Rothenbaum

Champions

Singles
- (Spain) Rafael Nadal

Doubles
- (United Kingdom) Jamie Murray / (Australia) John Peers
- German Open Tennis Championships

The 2015 German Open (also known as the bet–at–home Open 2015 for sponsorship reasons) was a men's tennis tournament played on outdoor red clay courts. It was the 109th edition of the German Open and part of the ATP World Tour 500 series of the 2015 ATP World Tour. It took place at the Am Rothenbaum in Hamburg, Germany, from 27 July through 2 August 2015. First-seeded Rafael Nadal won the singles title.

== Finals ==
=== Singles ===
- (Spain) Rafael Nadal defeated (Italy) Fabio Fognini, 7–5, 7–5

=== Doubles ===
- (United Kingdom) Jamie Murray / (Australia) John Peers defeated. (Colombia) Juan Sebastián Cabal / (Colombia) Robert Farah, 2–6, 6–3, [10–8]

== Points and prize money ==
=== Points distribution ===
Event	W	F	SF	QF	Round of 16	Round of 32	Q	Q2	Q1
Singles	500	300	180	90	45	0	20	10	0
Doubles	500	300	180	90	0	—N/a	—N/a	—N/a	—N/a

=== Prize money ===
Event	W	F	SF	QF	Round of 16	Round of 32	Q2	Q1
Singles	€311,755	€140,560	€66,580	€32,130	€16,380	€9,010	€1,015	€560
Doubles	€84,970	€38,340	€18,080	€8,740	€4,470	—N/a	—N/a	—N/a

== Singles main-draw entrants ==
=== Seeds ===
Country	Player	Rank^{1}	Seed
ESP	Rafael Nadal	10	1
ESP	Tommy Robredo	21	2
ESP	Roberto Bautista Agut	22	3
ITA	Andreas Seppi	24	4
URU	Pablo Cuevas	25	5
ARG	Juan Mónaco	27	6
ESP	Guillermo García López	28	7
ITA	Fabio Fognini	32	8

- ^{1} Rankings are as of July 20, 2015

=== Other entrants ===
The following players received wildcards into the singles main draw:

- (Germany) Florian Mayer
- (Spain) Jaume Munar
- (Spain) Rafael Nadal
- (Germany) Alexander Zverev

The following players received entry from the qualifying draw:

- (Spain) Íñigo Cervantes
- (Japan) Taro Daniel
- (Spain) Albert Montañés
- (France) Lucas Pouille

=== Withdrawals ===
Before the tournament

- (Spain) David Ferrer →replaced by (France) Benoît Paire
- (France) Gilles Simon →replaced by (United Kingdom) Aljaž Bedene

During the tournament

- (Italy) Simone Bolelli (gastroenteritis)

=== Retirements ===
- (Spain) Guillermo García López (hamstring injury)

== Doubles main-draw entrants ==
=== Seeds ===
Country	Player	Country	Player	Rank^{1}	Seed
ITA	Simone Bolelli	ITA	Fabio Fognini	18	1
AUT	Alexander Peya	BRA	Bruno Soares	34	2
GBR	Jamie Murray	AUS	John Peers	39	3
URU	Pablo Cuevas	ESP	David Marrero	52	4

- Rankings are as of July 20, 2015

=== Other entrants ===
The following pairs received wildcards into the doubles main draw:

- (Germany) Philipp Kohlschreiber / (Germany) Philipp Petzschner
- (Spain) Jaume Munar / (Spain) Rafael Nadal

The following pair received entry from the qualifying draw:

- (Germany) Frank Moser / (Germany) Jan-Lennard Struff

=== Withdrawals ===
During the tournament

- (Italy) Simone Bolelli (gastroenteritis)
- (Spain) Guillermo García López (hamstring injury)
