= Nicolas Reissig =

Austrian tennis player (born 1989)

- Full name: Nicolas Reissig
- Country (sports): Austria
- Residence: Schleedorf, Austria
- Born: 7 April 1989 (age 36) Oberndorf bei Salzburg, Austria
- Height: 1.85 m (6 ft 1 in)
- Turned pro: 2009
- Plays: Right-handed (one handed-backhand)
- Prize money: $71,213

Singles
- Career titles: 7 ITF
- Highest ranking: No. 344 (15 July 2013)

Doubles
- Career record: 0–1 (at ATP Tour level, Grand Slam level, and in Davis Cup)
- Career titles: 4 ITF
- Highest ranking: No. 521 (17 June 2013)

Nicolas Reissig (born 7 April 1989, in Oberndorf bei Salzburg) is an Austrian tennis player. Reissig has a career high ATP singles ranking of No. 344 achieved on 15 July 2013. Reissig made his ATP main draw doubles debut at the 2014 MercedesCup partnering Robin Kern, losing in the first round to Mate Pavić and André Sá. Reissig has a total of 7 singles titles and 4 doubles titles on the futures circuit.
