= Schleedorf =

- Municipality
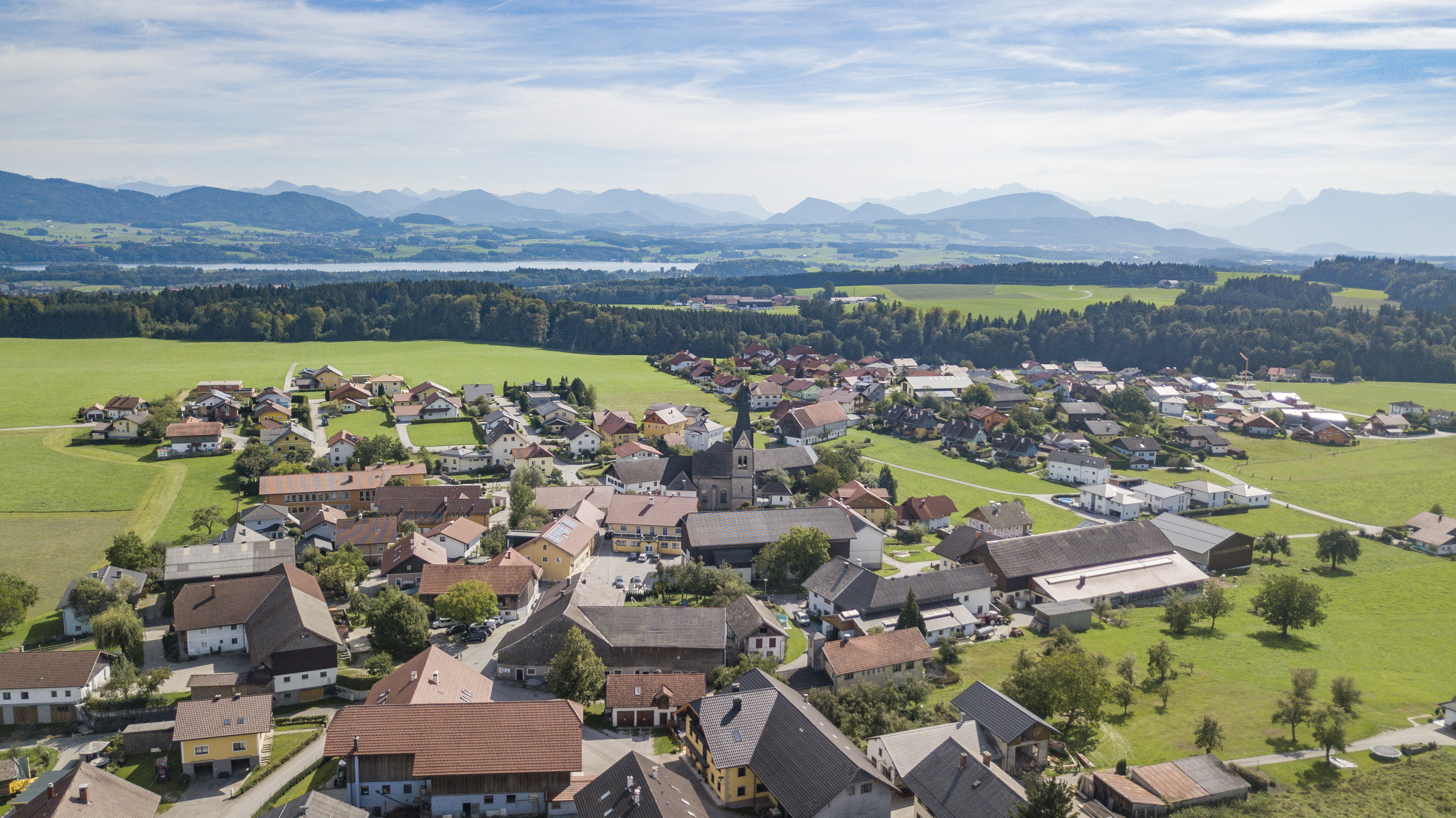
- Schleedorf

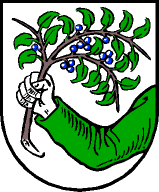
- Coat of arms

- Location within Austria
- Coordinates: 47°57′00″N 13°09′00″E
- Country: Austria
- State: Salzburg
- District: Salzburg-Umgebung

Government
  - Mayor: Hermann Scheipl (ÖVP)

Area
  - Total: 10.41 km^{2} (4.02 sq mi)
- Elevation: 613 m (2,011 ft)

Population (2018-01-01)
  - Total: 1,069
  - Density: 102.7/km^{2} (266.0/sq mi)
- Time zone: UTC+1 (CET)
  - Summer (DST): UTC+2 (CEST)
- Postal code: 5205
- Area code: 06216
- Vehicle registration: SL
- Website: www.schleedorf.at

Schleedorf is a municipality in the district of Salzburg-Umgebung in the state of Salzburg in Austria.

== Geography ==
The municipality lies in the Flachgau on the road from Köstendorf to Mattsee. Katastralgemeinden are Schleedorf, Engerreich, and Wallsberg. A further subdivision is Grabenmühle.
