= 2015 Barcelona Open Banc Sabadell =

- Date: 20 – 26 April
- Edition: 63rd
- Category: ATP World Tour 500
- Draw: 48S / 16D
- Prize money: €1,993,230
- Surface: Clay
- Location: Barcelona, Spain
- Venue: Real Club de Tenis Barcelona

Champions

Singles
- (Japan) Kei Nishikori

Doubles
- (Croatia) Marin Draganja / (Finland) Henri Kontinen
← 2014 ·	Barcelona Open Banc Sabadell	· 2016 →

The 2015 Barcelona Open Banc Sabadell (also known as the Torneo Godó) was a men's tennis tournament played on outdoor clay courts. It was the 63rd edition of the event and part of the ATP World Tour 500 series of the 2015 ATP World Tour. It took place at the Real Club de Tenis Barcelona in Barcelona, Catalonia, Spain, from 20 April until 26 April 2015. First-seeded Kei Nishikori won the singles title.

== Points and prize money ==
=== Points distribution ===
Event	W	F	SF	QF	Round of 16	Round of 32	Round of 64	Q	Q2	Q1
Singles	500	300	180	90	45	20	0	10	4	0
Doubles	500	300	180	90	0	—	—	10	0	0

=== Prize money ===
Event	W	F	SF	QF	Round of 16	Round of 32	Round of 64	Q2	Q1
Singles	€457,550	€208,600	€97,170	€46,375	€22,565	€12,025	€7,000	€1,295	€670
Doubles	€142,750	€64,420	€30,380	€14,680	€7,510	—	—	—	—

== Singles main-draw entrants ==
=== Seeds ===
Country	Player	Rank^{1}	Seed
JPN	Kei Nishikori	4	1
ESP	Rafael Nadal	5	2
ESP	David Ferrer	7	3
CRO	Marin Čilić	10	4
ESP	Feliciano López	12	5
FRA	Jo-Wilfried Tsonga	14	6
ESP	Roberto Bautista Agut	16	7
LAT	Ernests Gulbis	17	8
ESP	Tommy Robredo	20	9
URU	Pablo Cuevas	23	10
ARG	Leonardo Mayer	24	11
GER	Philipp Kohlschreiber	25	12
ITA	Fabio Fognini	28	13
SVK	Martin Kližan	29	14
COL	Santiago Giraldo	32	15
AUS	Nick Kyrgios	34	16

- ^{1} Rankings as of April 13, 2015.

=== Other entrants ===
The following players received wildcards into the main draw:

- (Spain) Roberto Carballés Baena
- (Australia) Nick Kyrgios
- (Spain) Albert Montañés
- (Sweden) Elias Ymer

The following players received entry from the qualifying draw:

- (Netherlands) Thiemo de Bakker
- (Hungary) Márton Fucsovics
- (Spain) Jaume Munar
- (Russia) Andrey Rublev
- (Japan) Yūichi Sugita
- (United Kingdom) James Ward

The following player received entry as a lucky loser:

- (France) Kenny de Schepper

=== Withdrawals ===
Before the tournament

- (Ukraine) Alexandr Dolgopolov →replaced by Kenny de Schepper
- (France) Richard Gasquet →replaced by Andrey Kuznetsov
- (Poland) Jerzy Janowicz →replaced by Benoît Paire
- (Canada) Vasek Pospisil →replaced by Teymuraz Gabashvili
- (Canada) Milos Raonic →replaced by Thomaz Bellucci

=== Retirements ===
- (Italy) Paolo Lorenzi

== Doubles main-draw entrants ==
=== Seeds ===
Country	Player	Country	Player	Rank^{1}	Seed
POL	Marcin Matkowski	SRB	Nenad Zimonjić	25	1
ESP	Marcel Granollers	ESP	Marc López	27	2
CAN	Daniel Nestor	IND	Leander Paes	30	3
AUT	Alexander Peya	BRA	Bruno Soares	31	4

- Rankings are as of April 13, 2015.

=== Other entrants ===
The following pairs received wildcards into the doubles main draw:

- (Spain) Gerard Granollers / (Spain) Oriol Roca Batalla
- (Spain) Albert Montañés / (Spain) Albert Ramos Viñolas

The following pair received entry from the qualifying draw:

- (Australia) Rameez Junaid / (Canada) Adil Shamasdin

== Finals ==
=== Singles ===
- (Japan) Kei Nishikori defeated (Spain) Pablo Andújar, 6−4, 6−4

=== Doubles ===
- (Croatia) Marin Draganja / (Finland) Henri Kontinen defeated (United Kingdom) Jamie Murray / (Australia) John Peers, 6–3, 6–7^{(6–8)}, [11–9]
