= 2014 MercedesCup =

- Date: 7–13 July
- Edition: 37th
- Category: World Tour 250
- Draw: 28S / 16D
- Prize money: €426,605
- Surface: Clay / outdoor
- Location: Stuttgart, Germany
- Venue: Tennis Club Weissenhof

Champions

Singles
- (Spain) Roberto Bautista Agut

Doubles
- (Poland) Mateusz Kowalczyk / (New Zealand) Artem Sitak
- Stuttgart Open

The 2014 MercedesCup was a men's tennis tournament played on outdoor clay courts. It was the 37th edition of the Stuttgart Open, and was part of the ATP World Tour 250 series of the 2014 ATP World Tour. It was held at the Tennis Club Weissenhof in Stuttgart, Germany, from 7 July until 13 July 2014. Third-seeded Roberto Bautista Agut won the singles title.

== Finals ==
=== Singles ===
- (Spain) Roberto Bautista Agut defeated (Czech Republic) Lukáš Rosol, 6–3, 4–6, 6–2

=== Doubles ===
- (Poland) Mateusz Kowalczyk / (New Zealand) Artem Sitak defeated (Spain) Guillermo García-López / (Austria) Philipp Oswald, 2–6, 6–1, [10–7]

== Singles main draw entrants ==
=== Seeds ===
| Country | Player | Rank^{1} | Seed |
|---|---|---|---|
| ITA | Fabio Fognini | 15 | 1 |
| RUS | Mikhail Youzhny | 16 | 2 |
| ESP | Roberto Bautista Agut | 23 | 3 |
| ESP | Feliciano López | 26 | 4 |
| GER | Philipp Kohlschreiber | 28 | 5 |
| ESP | Guillermo García-López | 34 | 6 |
| COL | Santiago Giraldo | 35 | 7 |
| ARG | Federico Delbonis | 37 | 8 |

- ^{1} Rankings are as of June 23, 2014

=== Other entrants ===
The following players received wildcards into the singles main draw:

- (Germany) Michael Berrer
- (Germany) Philipp Petzschner
- (Germany) Alexander Zverev

The following players received entry from the qualifying draw:

- (Italy) Marco Cecchinato
- (Russia) Philipp Davydenko
- (Croatia) Mate Delić
- (Switzerland) Yann Marti

The following players received entry as lucky losers:

- (Switzerland) Henri Laaksonen
- (Republic of Ireland) Louk Sorensen

=== Withdrawals ===
Before the tournament

- (Spain) Marcel Granollers
- (Germany) Tommy Haas (shoulder injury)
- (Uzbekistan) Denis Istomin
- (Slovakia) Martin Kližan (left wrist injury)
- (France) Édouard Roger-Vasselin (left knee injury)

== Doubles main draw entrants ==
=== Seeds ===
| Country | Player | Country | Player | Rank^{1} | Seed |
|---|---|---|---|---|---|
| GBR | Colin Fleming | POL | Mariusz Fyrstenberg | 67 | 1 |
| CRO | Marin Draganja | ROU | Florin Mergea | 76 | 2 |
| CZE | František Čermák | CZE | Lukáš Rosol | 114 | 3 |
| CRO | Mate Pavić | BRA | André Sá | 120 | 4 |

- Rankings are as of June 23, 2014

=== Other entrants ===
The following pairs received wildcards into the doubles main draw:

- (Germany) Michael Berrer / (Germany) Alexander Zverev
- (Germany) Robin Kern / (Austria) Nicolas Reissig

The following pair received entry as alternates:

- (Germany) Peter Gojowczyk / (Germany) Dominik Meffert

=== Withdrawals ===
Before the tournament

- (Slovakia) Martin Kližan (left wrist injury)
