= Philipp Davydenko =

Russian tennis player

Philipp Davydenko Филипп Давыденко
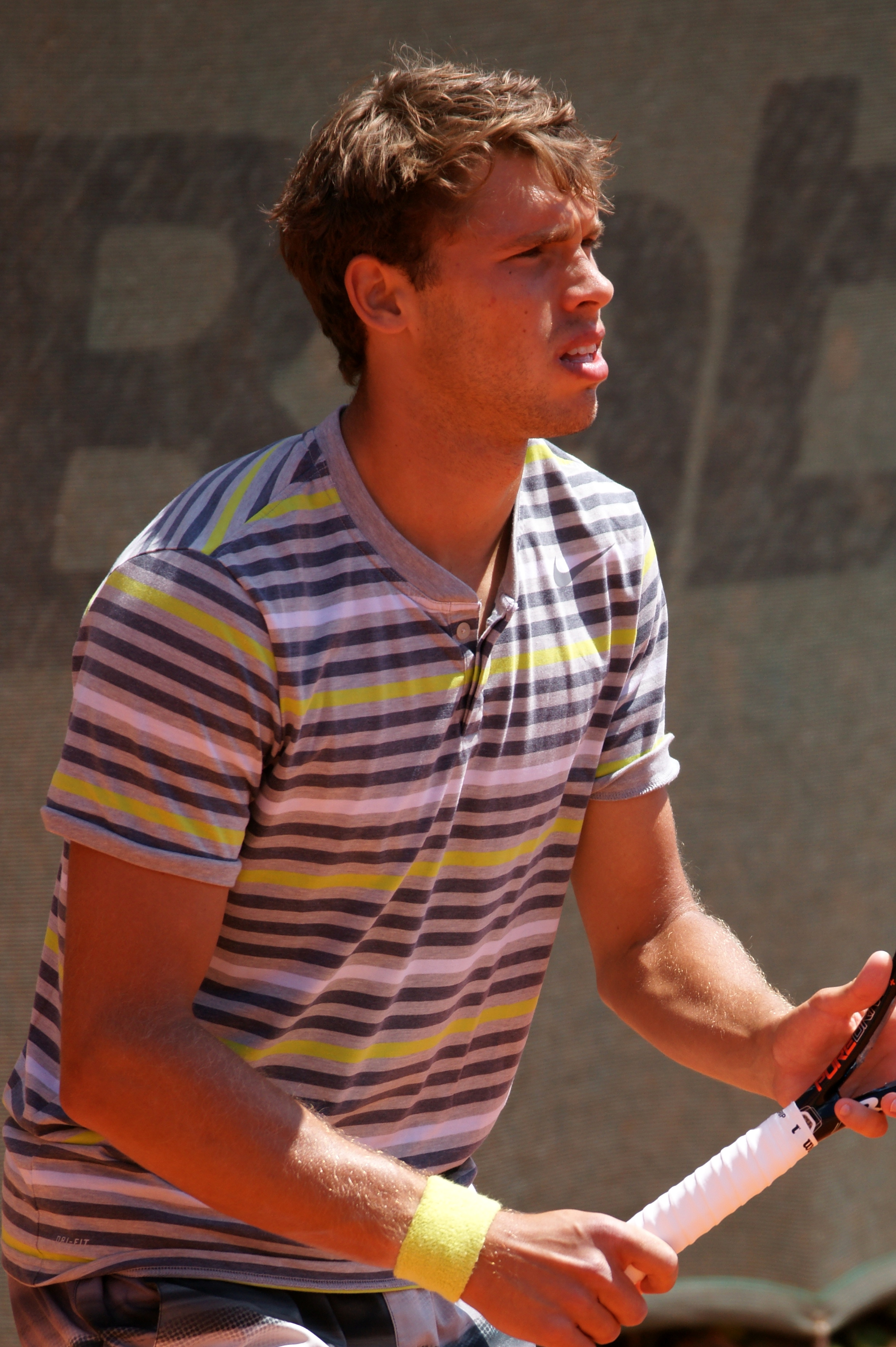
- Philipp Davydenko at the qualifications of Nice Open 45 at Ohio
- Full name: Philipp Eduardovich Davydenko
- Country (sports): Russia
- Residence: Bedburg, Germany
- Born: 2 September 1992 (age 33) Volgograd, Russia
- Height: 1.83 m (6 ft 0 in)
- Plays: Right-handed (one handed-backhand)
- Coach: Eduard Davydenko
- Prize money: $55,401

Singles
- Career record: 1–2 (at ATP Tour level, Grand Slam level, and in Davis Cup)
- Career titles: 0
- Highest ranking: No. 390 (8 December 2014)

Doubles
- Career record: 0–2 (at ATP Tour level, Grand Slam level, and in Davis Cup)
- Career titles: 0
- Highest ranking: No. 1,225 (10 September 2012)

Philipp Eduardovich Davydenko (Russian: Филипп Эдуардович Давыденко; born 2 September 1992 in Volgograd) is a Russian tennis player.

== Tennis career ==
Davydenko has a career high ATP singles ranking of No. 390 achieved on 8 December 2014 and a doubles ranking of No. 1,225 achieved on 10 September 2012.

Davydenko made his ATP main draw debut at the 2009 Kremlin Cup in the doubles event partnering Ilya Belyaev losing in the first round to Martín Vassallo Argüello and Horacio Zeballos. At the 2014 MercedesCup, Davydenko qualified for the main draw, defeating Facundo Bagnis, Alexander Lobkov and Louk Sorensen en route. In the main draw he won his first round match defeating Blaž Rola 6–4, 7–6^{(10–8)}, before losing to Santiago Giraldo in the second round in three sets.

Davydenko is the nephew of Nikolay Davydenko, a former world No.3 on the ATP tour.
