= 2015 MercedesCup – Singles =

Singles
- 2015 MercedesCup

Final
- Champion: (Spain) Rafael Nadal
- Runner-up: (Serbia) Viktor Troicki
- Score: 7–6^{(7–3)}, 6–3

Details
- Draw: 28
- Seeds: 8

Events
Singles	Doubles
- Stuttgart Open

Roberto Bautista Agut was the defending champion, but chose to defend his title in s'Hertogenbosch instead.

First-seeded Rafael Nadal won the title, defeating Viktor Troicki in the final, 7–6^{(7–3)}, 6–3.

== Seeds ==
The top four seeds receive a bye into the second round.

1. (Spain) Rafael Nadal (champion)
2. (Croatia) Marin Čilić (semifinals)
3. (Spain) Feliciano López (second round)
4. (France) Gaël Monfils (semifinals)
5. (Australia) Bernard Tomic (quarterfinals)
6. (Germany) Philipp Kohlschreiber (quarterfinals)
7. (Austria) Dominic Thiem (first round)
8. (Serbia) Viktor Troicki (final)

== Draw ==
Key

- Q = Qualifier
- WC = Wild card
- LL = Lucky loser
- Alt = Alternate
- ITF = ITF entry
- PR = Protected ranking
- SR = Special ranking
- SE = Special exempt
- JE = Junior exempt
- JR = Junior Accelerator Programme entrant
- CO = College Accelerator Programme entrant
- NG = Next Gen Accelerator Program entrant
- w/o = Walkover
- r = Retired
- d = Defaulted

=== Finals ===
Semifinals
1	(Spain) Rafael Nadal	6	6
4	(France) Gaël Monfils	3	4
8	(Serbia) Viktor Troicki	6	6^{1}	7^{7}
2	(Croatia) Marin Čilić	3	7^{7}	6^{2}

Final
1	(Spain) Rafael Nadal	7^{7}	6
8	(Serbia) Viktor Troicki	6^{3}	3

=== Top half ===
First round
(Cyprus) M Baghdatis	6	6
(Czech Republic) L Rosol	3	4
WC	(Germany) T Haas	6	7
(Kazakhstan) M Kukushkin	4	5
(Germany) J-L Struff	3	6^{5}
5	(Australia) B Tomic	6	7^{7}
(Austria) A Haider-Maurer	7^{7}	6
WC	(Germany) M Marterer	6^{5}	3
(Poland) J Janowicz	6^{5}	6	6
Q	(Germany) D Brown	7^{7}	4	3
(Ukraine) A Dolgopolov	3	3
6	(Germany) P Kohlschreiber	6	6

Second round
1	(Spain) R Nadal	7^{7}	6^{4}	6
(Cyprus) M Baghdatis	6^{5}	7^{7}	2
WC	(Germany) T Haas	6^{6}	2
5	(Australia) B Tomic	7^{8}	6
4	(France) G Monfils	7^{8}	7^{7}
(Austria) A Haider-Maurer	6^{6}	6^{5}
(Poland) J Janowicz	4	4
6	(Germany) P Kohlschreiber	6	6

Quarterfinals
1	(Spain) R Nadal	6	6^{6}	6
5	(Australia) B Tomic	4	7^{8}	3
4	(France) G Monfils	7	3	6
6	(Germany) P Kohlschreiber	5	6	3

Semifinals
1	(Spain) R Nadal	6	6
4	(France) G Monfils	3	4

=== Bottom half ===
First round
8	(Serbia) V Troicki	6	6
(Croatia) B Ćorić	2	0
Q	(Croatia) M Pavić	6	2	3
WC	(Germany) A Zverev	3	6	6
(Ukraine) S Stakhovsky	6	5	3^{r}
(Australia) S Groth	4	7	5
7	(Austria) D Thiem	6^{4}	2
Q	(Germany) M Zverev	7^{7}	6
(Germany) B Becker	1	2
(Italy) A Seppi	6	6
LL	(Germany) M Bachinger	7	7
Q	(Germany) P Gojowczyk	5	5

Second round
8	(Serbia) V Troicki	6	6^{6}	6
WC	(Germany) A Zverev	3	7^{8}	3
(Australia) S Groth	3	7^{7}	7^{8}
3	(Spain) F López	6	6^{5}	6^{6}
Q	(Germany) M Zverev	6	6
(Italy) A Seppi	2	4
LL	(Germany) M Bachinger	6^{2}	3
2	(Croatia) M Čilić	7^{7}	6

Quarterfinals
8	(Serbia) V Troicki	7^{7}	6
(Australia) S Groth	6^{3}	1
Q	(Germany) M Zverev	6	6^{5}	6^{5}
2	(Croatia) M Čilić	4	7^{7}	7^{7}

Semifinals
8	(Serbia) V Troicki	6	6^{1}	7^{7}
2	(Croatia) M Čilić	3	7^{7}	6^{2}

== Qualifying ==
=== Seeds ===
1. (Serbia) Filip Krajinović (qualifying competition)
2. (Germany) Dustin Brown (qualified)
3. (Colombia) Alejandro Falla (second round)
4. (Germany) Matthias Bachinger (qualifying competition, lucky loser)
5. (Uzbekistan) Farrukh Dustov (first round)
6. (Poland) Michał Przysiężny (second round)
7. (Germany) Peter Gojowczyk (qualified)
8. (Germany) Michael Berrer (qualifying competition)

=== Qualifiers ===
1. (Germany) Peter Gojowczyk
2. (Germany) Dustin Brown
3. (Croatia) Mate Pavić
4. (Germany) Mischa Zverev

=== Lucky losers ===
1. (Germany) Matthias Bachinger

=== Qualifying draw ===
==== First qualifier ====
First round
1	(Serbia) Filip Krajinović	6^{3}	7^{7}	7
(Germany) Daniel Brands	7^{7}	6^{5}	5
(Russia) Aslan Karatsev	3	4
(France) Rémi Boutillier	6	6
(Serbia) Ilija Bozoljac	3	6	6
(Switzerland) Adrien Bossel	6	1	2
(Germany) Andreas Beck	5	4
7	(Germany) Peter Gojowczyk	7	6

Second round
1	(Serbia) Filip Krajinović	3	6	6
(France) Rémi Boutillier	6	3	4
(Serbia) Ilija Bozoljac	6^{5}	4
7	(Germany) Peter Gojowczyk	7^{7}	6

Qualifying competition
1	(Serbia) Filip Krajinović	2	4
7	(Germany) Peter Gojowczyk	6	6

==== Second qualifier ====
First round
2	(Germany) Dustin Brown	6	6
WC	(Germany) Sebastian Sachs	2	1
WC	(Spain) David Vega Hernández	6^{1}	5
(Belarus) Dzmitry Zhyrmont	7^{7}	7
WC	(Germany) Robin Kern	0	0^{r}
WC	(Germany) Jan Choinski	6	4
(Canada) Frank Dancevic	7^{9}	0	6^{3}
8	(Germany) Michael Berrer	6^{7}	6	7^{7}

Second round
2	(Germany) Dustin Brown	7^{7}	6
(Belarus) Dzmitry Zhyrmont	6^{4}	3
WC	(Germany) Jan Choinski	1	6^{2}
8	(Germany) Michael Berrer	6	7^{7}

Qualifying competition
2	(Germany) Dustin Brown	6	7^{9}
8	(Germany) Michael Berrer	4	6^{7}

==== Third qualifier ====
First round
3	(Colombia) Alejandro Falla	6	3	7
(Georgia (country)) Nikoloz Basilashvili	4	6	5
(Croatia) Ante Pavić	5	2
(Japan) Yūichi Sugita	7	6
(Croatia) Mate Pavić	6	7^{8}
(Germany) Philipp Petzschner	2	6^{6}
(India) Vijay Sundar Prashanth	3	2
6	(Poland) Michał Przysiężny	6	6

Second round
3	(Colombia) Alejandro Falla	7^{7}	4	6^{3}
(Japan) Yūichi Sugita	6^{4}	6	7^{7}
(Croatia) Mate Pavić	6	6
6	(Poland) Michał Przysiężny	4	3

Qualifying competition
(Japan) Yūichi Sugita	7^{7}	6^{5}	4
(Croatia) Mate Pavić	6^{3}	7^{7}	6

==== Fourth qualifier ====
First round
4	(Germany) Matthias Bachinger	6	7
(India) Somdev Devvarman	2	5
(Austria) Martin Fischer	6	6
(Chinese Taipei) Jimmy Wang	2	4
PR	(Germany) Mischa Zverev	4	6	6
(Germany) Tim Pütz	6	1	4
(Slovenia) Grega Žemlja	7^{7}	7
5	(Uzbekistan) Farrukh Dustov	6^{5}	5

Second round
4	(Germany) Matthias Bachinger	6	6
(Austria) Martin Fischer	2	2
PR	(Germany) Mischa Zverev	7^{9}	6
(Slovenia) Grega Žemlja	6^{7}	1

Qualifying competition
4	(Germany) Matthias Bachinger	6^{3}	3
PR	(Germany) Mischa Zverev	7^{7}	6
