= 2021 Halle Open – Doubles =

Doubles
- 2021 Halle Open

Final
- Champions: (Germany) Kevin Krawietz; (Romania) Horia Tecău
- Runners-up: (Canada) Félix Auger-Aliassime; (Poland) Hubert Hurkacz
- Score: 7–6^{(7–4)}, 6–4

Details
- Draw: 24 (1Q / 2WC)
- Seeds: 8

Events
Singles	Doubles
← 2019 ·	Halle Open	· 2022 →

Kevin Krawietz and Horia Tecău defeated Félix Auger-Aliassime and Hubert Hurkacz in the final, 7–6^{(7–4)}, 6–4, to win the doubles tennis title at the 2021 Halle Open. It was their first title as a team.

Raven Klaasen and Michael Venus were the defending champions from when the event was last held in 2019, but they did not defend their title together. Klaasen played alongside Ben McLachlan but lost in the second round to Andrés Molteni and Guido Pella. Venus played alongside Tim Pütz but lost in the semifinals to Auger-Aliassime and Hurkacz.

== Seeds ==
1. (Croatia) Ivan Dodig / (Slovakia) Filip Polášek (second round)
2. (Poland) Łukasz Kubot / (France) Édouard Roger-Vasselin (second round)
3. (Germany) Kevin Krawietz / (Romania) Horia Tecău (champions)
4. (Netherlands) Wesley Koolhof / (Netherlands) Jean-Julien Rojer (second round)
5. (Germany) Tim Pütz / (New Zealand) Michael Venus (semifinals)
6. (Belgium) Sander Gillé / (Belgium) Joran Vliegen (semifinals)
7. (South Africa) Raven Klaasen / (Japan) Ben McLachlan (second round)
8. (Austria) Oliver Marach / (Pakistan) Aisam-ul-Haq Qureshi (second round)

== Draw ==
=== Key ===
- Q = Qualifier
- WC = Wild card
- LL = Lucky loser
- Alt = Alternate
- SE = Special exempt
- PR = Protected ranking
- ITF = ITF entry
- JE = Junior exempt
- w/o = Walkover
- r = Retired
- d = Defaulted
- SR = Special ranking

=== Finals ===
Semifinals

Final

5
- (Germany) Tim Pütz
- (New Zealand) Michael Venus
6^{4}
2

(Canada) Félix Auger-Aliassime
(Poland) Hubert Hurkacz
7^{7}
6

- (Canada) Félix Auger-Aliassime
- (Poland) Hubert Hurkacz
6^{4}
4

3
(Germany) Kevin Krawietz
(Romania) Horia Tecău
7^{7}
6

3
(Germany) Kevin Krawietz
(Romania) Horia Tecău
7^{8}
7

6
- (Belgium) Sander Gillé
- (Belgium) Joran Vliegen
6^{6}
5

=== Top half ===
First round

Second round

Quarterfinals

Semifinals

1
- (Croatia) I Dodig
- (Slovakia) F Polášek
7
1
[6]

Q
- (Germany) D Masur
- (Germany) R Molleker
3
5

(United States) A Krajicek
(United States) S Querrey
5
6
[10]

(United States) A Krajicek
(United States) S Querrey
6
7

- (United States) A Krajicek
- (United States) S Querrey
3
4

- (Brazil) M Demoliner
- (Mexico) S González
6^{5}
3

5
(Germany) T Pütz
(New Zealand) M Venus
6
6

LL
(Germany) Y Hanfmann
(Germany) D Koepfer
7^{7}
6

LL
- (Germany) Y Hanfmann
- (Germany) D Koepfer
6^{2}
2

5
(Germany) T Pütz
(New Zealand) M Venus
7^{7}
6

5
- (Germany) T Pütz
- (New Zealand) M Venus
6^{4}
2

(Canada) F Auger-Aliassime
(Poland) H Hurkacz
7^{7}
6

4
- (Netherlands) W Koolhof
- (Netherlands) J-J Rojer
6^{5}
3

- (Russia) K Khachanov
- (Russia) A Rublev
3
6
[5]

(Canada) F Auger-Aliassime
(Poland) H Hurkacz
7^{7}
6

(Canada) F Auger-Aliassime
(Poland) H Hurkacz
6
4
[10]

(Canada) F Auger-Aliassime
(Poland) H Hurkacz
6
6

(Israel) J Erlich
(South Africa) L Harris
5
7^{7}
[10]

- (Israel) J Erlich
- (South Africa) L Harris
3
4

- (Italy) S Bolelli
- (Argentina) M González
7
6^{3}
5

(Israel) J Erlich
(South Africa) L Harris
6
6

8
- (Austria) O Marach
- (Pakistan) A-u-H Qureshi
3
3

=== Bottom half ===
First round

Second round

Quarterfinals

Semifinals

7
- (South Africa) R Klaasen
- (Japan) B McLachlan
6^{4}
6^{6}

(Argentina) A Molteni
(Argentina) G Pella
7^{8}
4
[10]

(Argentina) A Molteni
(Argentina) G Pella
7^{7}
7^{8}

WC
- (Germany) D Altmaier
- (Switzerland) D Stricker
6^{6}
6
[7]

- (Argentina) A Molteni
- (Argentina) G Pella
4
2

(Bosnia and Herzegovina) T Brkić
(Serbia) N Ćaćić
4
6
[10]

3
(Germany) K Krawietz
(Romania) H Tecău
6
6

WC
- (Germany) D Brown
- (Germany) J-L Struff
6
4
[7]

- (Bosnia and Herzegovina) T Brkić
- (Serbia) N Ćaćić
6^{3}
3

3
(Germany) K Krawietz
(Romania) H Tecău
7^{7}
6

3
(Germany) K Krawietz
(Romania) H Tecău
7^{8}
7

6
- (Belgium) S Gillé
- (Belgium) J Vliegen
6^{6}
5

6
(Belgium) S Gillé
(Belgium) J Vliegen
7^{7}
6

(Australia) L Saville
(Australia) J Thompson
6
6

- (Australia) L Saville
- (Australia) J Thompson
6^{4}
3

- (Denmark) F Nielsen
- (Croatia) F Škugor
3
4

6
(Belgium) S Gillé
(Belgium) J Vliegen
6
7^{7}

(India) R Bopanna
(India) D Sharan
7^{8}
6

- (India) R Bopanna
- (India) D Sharan
3
6^{3}

- (Moldova) R Albot
- (Georgia (country)) N Basilashvili
6^{6}
4

(India) R Bopanna
(India) D Sharan
7^{13}
6

2
- (Poland) Ł Kubot
- (France) É Roger-Vasselin
6^{11}
4

== Qualifying ==
=== Seeds ===
1. (United States) Evan King / (United States) Hunter Reese (first round)
2. (Sweden) André Göransson / (United States) Sebastian Korda (first round)

=== Qualifiers ===
1. (Germany) Daniel Masur / (Germany) Rudolf Molleker

=== Lucky losers ===
1. (Germany) Yannick Hanfmann / (Germany) Dominik Koepfer

=== Qualifying draw ===
First round

Qualifying competition

1
- (United States) Evan King
- (United States) Hunter Reese
4
6^{4}

WC
(Germany) Daniel Masur
(Germany) Rudolf Molleker
6
7^{7}

WC
(Germany) Daniel Masur
(Germany) Rudolf Molleker
5
7^{7}
[10]

- (Germany) Yannick Hanfmann
- (Germany) Dominik Koepfer
7
6^{5}
[6]

(Germany) Yannick Hanfmann
(Germany) Dominik Koepfer
6
7^{7}

2
- (Sweden) André Göransson
- (United States) Sebastian Korda
2
6^{3}
