= 2006 Gerry Weber Open =

- Date: 12–18 June
- Edition: 14th
- Category: International Series
- Draw: 2S / 16D
- Prize money: $775,000
- Surface: Grass / outdoor
- Location: Halle, Germany
- Venue: Gerry Weber Stadion

Champions

Singles
- (Switzerland) Roger Federer

Doubles
- (France) Fabrice Santoro / (Serbia) Nenad Zimonjić
← 2005 ·	Gerry Weber Open	· 2007 →

The 2006 Gerry Weber Open was a men's tennis tournament played on outdoor grass courts. It was the 14th edition of the Gerry Weber Open, and was part of the International Series of the 2006 ATP Tour. It took place at the Gerry Weber Stadion in Halle, North Rhine-Westphalia, Germany, from 12 June until 18 June 2006.

The singles field was led by World No. 1, Australian Open champion, French Open runner-up, and 2003, 2004 and 2005 Halle winner Roger Federer, Australian Open semifinalist Nicolas Kiefer, and Auckland titlist Jarkko Nieminen. Also present were Australian Open runner-up Marcos Baghdatis, Adelaide semifinalist Tomáš Berdych, Tommy Haas, Christophe Rochus and Kristof Vliegen.

First-seeded Roger Federer won his fourth consecutive singles title at the event.

== Finals ==
=== Singles ===
(Switzerland) Roger Federer defeated (Czech Republic) Tomáš Berdych, 6–0, 6–7^{(4–7)}, 6–2

- It was Federer's 5th title of the year and the 38th of his career. It was his 4th consecutive win at the event.

=== Doubles ===
(France) Fabrice Santoro / (Serbia) Nenad Zimonjić defeated (Germany) Michael Kohlmann / (Germany) Rainer Schüttler, 6–0, 6–4

- It was Santoro's 2nd title of the year and the 24th of his career. It was Zimonjic's 2nd title of the year and the 12th of his career.
