= 2018 Gerry Weber Open – Doubles =

Doubles
- 2018 Gerry Weber Open

Final
- Champions: (Poland) Łukasz Kubot (Brazil) Marcelo Melo
- Runners-up: (Germany) Alexander Zverev (Germany) Mischa Zverev
- Score: 7–6^{(7–1)}, 6–4

Details
- Draw: 16
- Seeds: 4

Events
| Singles | Doubles |
| ← 2017 · | Gerry Weber Open | · 2019 → |

Łukasz Kubot and Marcelo Melo were the defending champions and successfully defended their title, defeating Alexander and Mischa Zverev in the final, 7–6^{(7–1)}, 6–4 in a repeat of the previous year's final.

== Seeds ==
1. (Poland) Łukasz Kubot / (Brazil) Marcelo Melo (champions)
2. (Croatia) Nikola Mektić / (Austria) Alexander Peya (semifinals)
3. (Pakistan) Aisam-ul-Haq Qureshi / (Netherlands) Jean-Julien Rojer (first round)
4. (Croatia) Ivan Dodig / (United States) Rajeev Ram (semifinals)

== Draw ==
=== Key ===
- Q = Qualifier
- WC = Wild card
- LL = Lucky loser
- Alt = Alternate
- SE = Special exempt
- PR = Protected ranking
- ITF = ITF entry
- JE = Junior exempt
- w/o = Walkover
- r = Retired
- d = Defaulted
- SR = Special ranking

=== Draw ===
First round
1 | (Poland) Ł Kubot (Brazil) M Melo | 6 | 6
Q | (Israel) J Erlich (United States) N Monroe | 3 | 4
(Belarus) M Mirnyi (Austria) P Oswald | 7 | 7^{7}
(Poland) M Matkowski (Netherlands) M Middelkoop | 5 | 6^{4}
4 | (Croatia) I Dodig (United States) R Ram | 6 | 6
(Russia) K Khachanov (France) L Pouille | 3 | 0
(Spain) M Granollers (Netherlands) R Haase | 6 | 7^{7}
(Japan) B McLachlan (Japan) K Nishikori | 3 | 6^{3}
(South Africa) R Klaasen (New Zealand) M Venus | 4 | 6^{4}
WC | (Germany) T Pütz (Germany) J-L Struff | 6 | 7^{7}
(Germany) A Zverev (Germany) M Zverev | 6^{7} | 7^{7} | [10]
3 | (Pakistan) A-u-H Qureshi (Netherlands) J-J Rojer | 7^{9} | 6^{2} | [8]
(United States) S Johnson (Austria) D Thiem | 6^{2} | 7^{7} | [6]
(United Kingdom) D Inglot (Croatia) F Škugor | 7^{7} | 6^{5} | [10]
WC | (Germany) P Kohlschreiber (Germany) P Petzschner | 2 | 4
2 | (Croatia) N Mektić (Austria) A Peya | 6 | 6

Quarterfinals
1 | (Poland) Ł Kubot (Brazil) M Melo | 6^{2} | 6 | [10]
(Belarus) M Mirnyi (Austria) P Oswald | 7^{7} | 3 | [4]
4 | (Croatia) I Dodig (United States) R Ram | 7 | 7
(Spain) M Granollers (Netherlands) R Haase | 5 | 5
WC | (Germany) T Pütz (Germany) J-L Struff | 3 | 6 | [3]
(Germany) A Zverev (Germany) M Zverev | 6 | 4 | [10]
(United Kingdom) D Inglot (Croatia) F Škugor | 3 | 3
2 | (Croatia) N Mektić (Austria) A Peya | 6 | 6

Semifinals
1 | (Poland) Ł Kubot (Brazil) M Melo | 6^{5} | 6 | [12]
4 | (Croatia) I Dodig (United States) R Ram | 7^{7} | 3 | [10]
(Germany) A Zverev (Germany) M Zverev | 6 | 3 | [10]
2 | (Croatia) N Mektić (Austria) A Peya | 3 | 6 | [5]

Final
1 | (Poland) Ł Kubot (Brazil) M Melo | 7^{7} | 6
(Germany) A Zverev (Germany) M Zverev | 6^{1} | 4

== Qualifying ==
=== Seeds ===
1. (India) Divij Sharan / (New Zealand) Artem Sitak (first round)
2. (Israel) Jonathan Erlich / (United States) Nicholas Monroe (qualified)

=== Qualifiers ===
1. (Israel) Jonathan Erlich / (United States) Nicholas Monroe

=== Qualifying draw ===
First round
1 | (India) Divij Sharan (New Zealand) Artem Sitak | 3 | 6 | [2]
WC | (Germany) Andre Begemann (Germany) Dustin Brown | 6 | 3 | [10]
(France) Benoît Paire (Italy) Andreas Seppi | 3 | 4
2 | (Israel) Jonathan Erlich (United States) Nicholas Monroe | 6 | 6

Qualifying competition
WC | (Germany) Andre Begemann (Germany) Dustin Brown | 6 | 3 | [12]
2 | (Israel) Jonathan Erlich (United States) Nicholas Monroe | 4 | 6 | [14]
