= 2019 Halle Open =

- Date: 17–23 June
- Edition: 27th
- Category: ATP Tour 500
- Draw: 32S / 16D
- Prize money: €2,116,915
- Surface: Grass
- Location: Halle, Germany
- Venue: Gerry Weber Stadion

Champions

Singles
- (Switzerland) Roger Federer

Doubles
- (South Africa) Raven Klaasen / (New Zealand) Michael Venus
| ← 2018 · | Halle Open | · 2021 → |

The 2019 Halle Open (known for sponsorship reasons as the 2019 Noventi Open) was a tennis tournament played on outdoor grass courts. It was the 27th edition of the Halle Open and part of the ATP Tour 500 series of the 2019 ATP Tour. It took place at the Gerry Weber Stadion in Halle, Germany, between 17 June and 23 June 2019.

== Points and prize money ==
=== Point distribution ===
| Event | W | F | SF | QF | Round of 16 | Round of 32 | Q | Q2 | Q1 |
| Singles | 500 | 300 | 180 | 90 | 45 | 0 | 20 | 10 | 0 |
| Doubles | 500 | 300 | 180 | 90 | 0 | N/A | 45 | 25 | 0 |

=== Prize money ===
| Event | W | F | SF | QF | Round of 16 | Round of 32 | Q | Q2 | Q1 |
| Singles | €429,955 | €215,940 | €108,965 | €57,260 | €28,620 | €15,830 | – | €6,090 | €3,045 |
| Doubles* | €135,090 | €66,130 | €33,170 | €17,020 | €8,790 | N/A | N/A | N/A | N/A |

_{*per team}

== ATP singles main-draw entrants ==
=== Seeds ===
| Country | Player | Rank^{1} | Seed |
|---|---|---|---|
| SUI | Roger Federer | 3 | 1 |
| GER | Alexander Zverev | 5 | 2 |
| RUS | Karen Khachanov | 9 | 3 |
| CRO | Borna Ćorić | 14 | 4 |
| FRA | Gaël Monfils | 16 | 5 |
| GEO | Nikoloz Basilashvili | 17 | 6 |
| ESP | Roberto Bautista Agut | 20 | 7 |
| ARG | Guido Pella | 22 | 8 |

- ^{1} Rankings are as of June 10, 2019.

=== Other entrants ===
The following players received wildcards into the main draw:

- (Germany) Peter Gojowczyk
- (Germany) Rudolf Molleker
- (France) Jo-Wilfried Tsonga

The following players received entry from the qualifying draw:

- (Germany) Mats Moraing
- (Italy) Andreas Seppi
- (Portugal) João Sousa
- (Ukraine) Sergiy Stakhovsky

The following player received entry as a lucky loser:

- (Serbia) Miomir Kecmanović

=== Withdrawals ===
Before the tournament

- (Spain) Pablo Carreño Busta → replaced by (Spain) Jaume Munar
- (Japan) Kei Nishikori → replaced by (Serbia) Miomir Kecmanović
- (Austria) Dominic Thiem → replaced by (United States) Taylor Fritz

=== Retirements ===
- (Croatia) Borna Ćorić

== ATP doubles main-draw entrants ==
=== Seeds ===
| Country | Player | Country | Player | Rank^{1} | Seed |
|---|---|---|---|---|---|
| POL | Łukasz Kubot | BRA | Marcelo Melo | 6 | 1 |
| RSA | Raven Klaasen | NZL | Michael Venus | 20 | 2 |
| CRO | Nikola Mektić | CRO | Franko Škugor | 27 | 3 |
| GER | Kevin Krawietz | GER | Andreas Mies | 43 | 4 |

- ^{1} Rankings are as of June 10, 2019.

=== Other entrants ===
The following pairs received wildcards into the doubles main draw:

- (Germany) Dustin Brown / (Germany) Tim Pütz
- ~~(Germany) Alexander Zverev / (Germany) Mischa Zverev~~

The following pair received entry from the qualifying draw:

- (Brazil) Marcelo Demoliner / (India) Divij Sharan

The following pair received entry as lucky losers:

- (Australia) Matthew Ebden / (United States) Denis Kudla

=== Withdrawals ===
Before the tournament

- (Germany) Alexander Zverev

== Finals ==
=== Singles ===
- (Switzerland) Roger Federer defeated (Belgium) David Goffin, 7–6^{(7–2)}, 6–1

=== Doubles ===
- (South Africa) Raven Klaasen / (New Zealand) Michael Venus defeated (Poland) Łukasz Kubot / (Brazil) Marcelo Melo, 4–6, 6–3, [10–4]
