= 2008 Gerry Weber Open – Singles =

Singles
- 2008 Gerry Weber Open

Final
- Champion: (Switzerland) Roger Federer
- Runner-up: (Germany) Philipp Kohlschreiber
- Score: 6–3, 6–4

Details
- Draw: 32
- Seeds: 8

Events
Singles	Doubles
- Gerry Weber Open

Tomáš Berdych was the defending champion, but lost in the second round to Robin Söderling.

Roger Federer won in the final 6–3, 6–4, against Philipp Kohlschreiber. It was Federer's record-extending fifth singles title in Halle, after previously winning four consecutive titles (2003–06) and skipping the tournament in 2007 due to fatigue. He did not lose a single set in the entire tournament and, in the process, extended his record grass court winning streak to 59 matches.

== Seeds ==
1. (Switzerland) Roger Federer (champion)
2. (United States) James Blake (semifinals)
3. (Czech Republic) Tomáš Berdych (second round)
4. (Russia) Mikhail Youzhny (second round)
5. (Cyprus) Marcos Baghdatis (quarterfinals)
6. (Czech Republic) Radek Štěpánek (first round)
7. (Finland) Jarkko Nieminen (first round)
8. (Croatia) Ivan Ljubičić (first round)

== Draw ==
Key

- Q = Qualifier
- WC = Wild card
- LL = Lucky loser
- Alt = Alternate
- ITF = ITF entry
- PR = Protected ranking
- SR = Special ranking
- SE = Special exempt
- JE = Junior exempt
- JR = Junior Accelerator Programme entrant
- CO = College Accelerator Programme entrant
- NG = Next Gen Accelerator Program entrant
- w/o = Walkover
- r = Retired
- d = Defaulted

=== Finals ===
Semifinals
1	(Switzerland) Roger Federer	6	6
(Germany) Nicolas Kiefer	1	4
(Germany) Philipp Kohlschreiber	6	7
2	(United States) James Blake	3	5

Final
1	(Switzerland) Roger Federer	6	6
(Germany) Philipp Kohlschreiber	3	4

=== Top half ===
First round
1	(Switzerland) R Federer	6	6
(Germany) M Berrer	4	2
Q	(United States) S Lipsky	6	3	2
Q	(Czech Republic) J Vacek	3	6	6
(Germany) R Schüttler	6^{4}	4
(France) F Santoro	7^{7}	6
Q	(Czech Republic) J Hernych	4	5
5	(Cyprus) M Baghdatis	6	7
4	(Russia) M Youzhny	6	6
(Russia) D Tursunov	3	1
(Netherlands) R Haase	6	3	2
(Germany) N Kiefer	4	6	6
(Belgium) O Rochus	1	4
(Belgium) S Darcis	6	6
(France) M Llodra	6^{6}	7^{7}	7
8	(Croatia) I Ljubičić	7^{8}	6^{5}	5

Second round
1	(Switzerland) R Federer	7	6
Q	(Czech Republic) J Vacek	5	3
(France) F Santoro	4	3
5	(Cyprus) M Baghdatis	6	6
4	(Russia) M Youzhny	2	7	3
(Germany) N Kiefer	6	5	6
(Belgium) S Darcis	6^{6}	6^{3}
(France) M Llodra	7^{8}	7^{7}

Quarterfinals
1	(Switzerland) R Federer	6	6
5	(Cyprus) M Baghdatis	4	4
(Germany) N Kiefer	4
(France) M Llodra	0^{r}

Semifinals
1	(Switzerland) R Federer	6	6
(Germany) N Kiefer	1	4

=== Bottom half ===
First round
6	(Czech Republic) R Štěpánek	7^{7}	6^{3}	4
(Germany) T Haas	6^{0}	7^{7}	6
(France) J Benneteau	4	1
(Germany) P Kohlschreiber	6	6
(Sweden) R Söderling	6	4	6
WC	(Germany) P Petzschner	4	6	4
(Sweden) T Johansson	3	5
3	(Czech Republic) T Berdych	6	7
7	(Finland) J Nieminen	6	4	2
(Germany) M Zverev	2	6	6
WC	(Germany) A Beck	6^{4}	7^{7}	6
(France) M Gicquel	7^{7}	6^{4}	3
(Germany) D Gremelmayr	4	2
WC	(Germany) B Becker	6	6
Q	(Germany) B Phau	4	1
2	(United States) J Blake	6	6

Second round
(Germany) T Haas	5	7	6^{5}
(Germany) P Kohlschreiber	7	5	7^{7}
(Sweden) R Söderling	6	7
3	(Czech Republic) T Berdych	2	5
(Germany) M Zverev	7^{7}	6^{5}	1
WC	(Germany) A Beck	6^{5}	7^{7}	6
WC	(Germany) B Becker	6	5	3
2	(United States) J Blake	4	7	6

Quarterfinals
(Germany) P Kohlschreiber	6	7^{7}
(Sweden) R Söderling	4	6^{4}
WC	(Germany) A Beck	6^{4}	6^{5}
2	(United States) J Blake	7^{7}	7^{7}

Semifinals
(Germany) P Kohlschreiber	6	7
2	(United States) J Blake	3	5
