= 2007 Gerry Weber Open =

- Date: 11–17 June
- Edition: 15th
- Category: International Series
- Draw: 32S / 16D
- Prize money: $775,000
- Surface: Grass / outdoor
- Location: Halle, Germany
- Venue: Gerry Weber Stadion

Champions

Singles
- (Czech Republic) Tomáš Berdych

Doubles
- (Sweden) Simon Aspelin / (Austria) Julian Knowle
← 2006 ·	Gerry Weber Open	· 2008 →

The 2007 Gerry Weber Open was a men's tennis tournament played on outdoor grass courts. It was the 15th edition of the Gerry Weber Open, and was part of the International Series of the 2007 ATP Tour. It took place at the Gerry Weber Stadion in Halle, North Rhine-Westphalia, Germany, from 11 June through 17 June 2007.

The announced top seeds were World No. 1, Australian Open champion, French Open runner-up and defending champion Roger Federer, ATP No. 3 and French Open semifinalist Nikolay Davydenko, and Sydney titlist James Blake. Other top players competing were 2006 Halle finalist Tomáš Berdych, Estoril runner-up Richard Gasquet, Mikhail Youzhny, David Nalbandian and Marcos Baghdatis.

== Finals ==
=== Singles ===
(Czech Republic) Tomáš Berdych defeated (Cyprus) Marcos Baghdatis, 7–5, 6–4

- It was Berdych's 1st title of the year and the 3rd of his career.

=== Doubles ===
(Sweden) Simon Aspelin / (Austria) Julian Knowle defeated (France) Fabrice Santoro / (Serbia) Nenad Zimonjić, 6–4, 7–6^{(7–5)}

- It was Aspelin's 2nd title of the year and the 8th of his career. It was Knowle's 2nd title of the year and the 9th of his career
