= 2012 Gerry Weber Open =

- Date: 11–17 June
- Edition: 20th
- Category: ATP World Tour 250
- Draw: 28S / 16D
- Prize money: €663,750
- Surface: Grass / outdoor
- Location: Halle, Germany
- Venue: Gerry Weber Stadion

Champions

Singles
- (Germany) Tommy Haas

Doubles
- (Pakistan) Aisam-ul-Haq Qureshi / (Netherlands) Jean-Julien Rojer
← 2011 ·	Gerry Weber Open	· 2013 →

The 2012 Gerry Weber Open was a men's tennis tournament played on outdoor grass courts. It was the 20th edition of the event known that year as the Gerry Weber Open and is part of the ATP World Tour 250 series of the 2012 ATP World Tour. It took place at the Gerry Weber Stadion in Halle, Germany, between 11 June and 17 June 2012. Unseeded Tommy Haas won the singles title.

== Singles main draw entrants ==
=== Seeds ===
Country	Player	Rank^{1}	Seed
ESP	Rafael Nadal	2	1
SUI	Roger Federer	3	2
CZE	Tomáš Berdych	7	3
UKR	Alexandr Dolgopolov	19	4
CAN	Milos Raonic	22	5
ESP	Marcel Granollers	23	6
ITA	Andreas Seppi	25	7
GER	Philipp Kohlschreiber	26	8

- ^{1} Seedings are based on the rankings of May 28, 2012

=== Other entrants ===
The following players received wildcards into the singles main draw:

- (Germany) Dustin Brown
- (Germany) Tommy Haas
- (Germany) Philipp Petzschner

The following players received entry from the qualifying draw:

- (Russia) Konstantin Kravchuk
- (United States) Tim Smyczek
- (China) Zhang Ze
- (Germany) Mischa Zverev

=== Withdrawals ===
- (France) Gaël Monfils (right knee injury)
- (Japan) Kei Nishikori (stomach injury)

== Doubles main draw entrants ==
=== Seeds ===
Country	Player	Country	Player	Rank^{1}	Seed
PAK	Aisam-ul-Haq Qureshi	NED	Jean-Julien Rojer	49	1
CZE	František Čermák	AUT	Julian Knowle	70	2
GER	Dustin Brown	AUT	Oliver Marach	74	3
ESP	Marcel Granollers	ESP	Rafael Nadal	81	4

- Rankings are as of May 28, 2012

=== Other entrants ===
The following pairs received wildcards into the doubles main draw:

- (Switzerland) Marco Chiudinelli / (Germany) Mischa Zverev
- (Germany) Tommy Haas / (Germany) Alexander Waske

=== Retirements ===
- (Spain) Marcel Granollers (right ankle strain)

== Finals ==
=== Singles ===
(Germany) Tommy Haas defeated (Switzerland) Roger Federer, 7–6^{(7–5)}, 6–4

=== Doubles ===
(Pakistan) Aisam-ul-Haq Qureshi / (Netherlands) Jean-Julien Rojer defeated (Philippines) Treat Conrad Huey / (United States) Scott Lipsky, 6–3, 6–4
