= 2016 Gerry Weber Open – Doubles =

Doubles
- 2016 Gerry Weber Open

Final
- Champions: (South Africa) Raven Klaasen (United States) Rajeev Ram
- Runners-up: (Poland) Łukasz Kubot (Austria) Alexander Peya
- Score: 7–6^{(7–5)}, 6–2

Details
- Draw: 16
- Seeds: 4

Events
Singles	Doubles
← 2015 ·	Gerry Weber Open	· 2017 →

Raven Klaasen and Rajeev Ram were the defending champions and successfully defended their title, defeating Łukasz Kubot and Alexander Peya in the final, 7–6^{(7–5)}, 6–2.

== Seeds ==
1. (United States) Bob Bryan / (United States) Mike Bryan (semifinals)
2. (Poland) Łukasz Kubot / (Austria) Alexander Peya (final)
3. (South Africa) Raven Klaasen / (United States) Rajeev Ram (champions)
4. (Finland) Henri Kontinen / (Australia) John Peers (semifinals)

== Draw ==
=== Key ===
- Q = Qualifier
- WC = Wild card
- LL = Lucky loser
- Alt = Alternate
- SE = Special exempt
- PR = Protected ranking
- ITF = ITF entry
- JE = Junior exempt
- w/o = Walkover
- r = Retired
- d = Defaulted
- SR = Special ranking

=== Draw ===
First round
1	(United States) B Bryan (United States) M Bryan	6	6
(Belgium) D Goffin (France) L Pouille	2	3
(Czech Republic) T Berdych (Spain) M Granollers	6	6
(Philippines) T Huey (Belarus) M Mirnyi	3	4
3	(South Africa) R Klaasen (United States) R Ram	6	6^{5}	[10]
WC	(Austria) J Knowle (Germany) F Mayer	3	7^{7}	[6]
WC	(Germany) A Zverev (Germany) M Zverev	7^{7}	4	[19]
(Czech Republic) R Štěpánek (Serbia) N Zimonjić	6^{4}	6	[17]
(Colombia) JS Cabal (Colombia) R Farah	6	7^{7}
LL	(Mexico) S González (United States) S Lipsky	0	6^{5}
(Sweden) R Lindstedt (Serbia) V Troicki	3	6^{9}
4	(Finland) H Kontinen (Australia) J Peers	6	7^{11}
(Italy) A Seppi (Portugal) J Sousa	6^{8}	4
Q	(United States) B Baker (Uzbekistan) D Istomin	7^{10}	6
(Germany) P Kohlschreiber (Austria) D Thiem	6	6^{12}	[7]
2	(Poland) Ł Kubot (Austria) A Peya	4	7^{14}	[10]

Quarterfinals
1	(United States) B Bryan (United States) M Bryan	6	6
(Czech Republic) T Berdych (Spain) M Granollers	3	2
3	(South Africa) R Klaasen (United States) R Ram	6	6
WC	(Germany) A Zverev (Germany) M Zverev	4	2
(Colombia) JS Cabal (Colombia) R Farah	3	6^{1}
4	(Finland) H Kontinen (Australia) J Peers	6	7^{7}
Q	(United States) B Baker (Uzbekistan) D Istomin	2	6	[9]
2	(Poland) Ł Kubot (Austria) A Peya	6	2	[11]

Semifinals
1	(United States) B Bryan (United States) M Bryan	4	6^{2}
3	(South Africa) R Klaasen (United States) R Ram	6	7^{7}
4	(Finland) H Kontinen (Australia) J Peers	2	6	[7]
2	(Poland) Ł Kubot (Austria) A Peya	6	1	[10]

Final
3	(South Africa) R Klaasen (United States) R Ram	7^{7}	6
2	(Poland) Ł Kubot (Austria) A Peya	6^{5}	2

== Qualifying ==
=== Seeds ===
1. (Mexico) Santiago González / (United States) Scott Lipsky (qualifying competition, Lucky losers)
2. (United States) Brian Baker / (Uzbekistan) Denis Istomin (qualified)

=== Qualifiers ===
1. (United States) Brian Baker / (Uzbekistan) Denis Istomin

=== Lucky losers ===
1. (Mexico) Santiago González / (United States) Scott Lipsky

=== Qualifying draw ===
First round
1	(Mexico) Santiago González (United States) Scott Lipsky	6	7^{7}
(Lithuania) Ričardas Berankis (Russia) Andrey Kuznetsov	3	6^{5}
WC	(Germany) Matthias Bachinger (Germany) Frank Moser	3	3
2/PR	(United States) Brian Baker (Uzbekistan) Denis Istomin	6	6

Qualifying competition
1	(Mexico) Santiago González (United States) Scott Lipsky	7^{7}	3	[4]
2/PR	(United States) Brian Baker (Uzbekistan) Denis Istomin	6^{4}	6	[10]
