= 2021 Halle Open =

- Date: 14–20 June
- Edition: 28th
- Category: ATP Tour 500
- Draw: 32S / 24D
- Surface: Grass
- Location: Halle, Germany
- Venue: OWL Arena

Champions

Singles
- (France) Ugo Humbert

Doubles
- (Germany) Kevin Krawietz / (Romania) Horia Tecău
← 2019 ·	Halle Open	· 2022 →

The 2021 Halle Open (known for sponsorship reasons as the 2021 Noventi Open) was a men's tennis tournament played on outdoor grass courts. It was the 28th edition of the Halle Open and part of the ATP Tour 500 series of the 2021 ATP Tour. It took place at the OWL Arena in Halle, Germany, between 14 June and 20 June 2021. Unseeded Ugo Humbert won the singles title.

== Finals ==
=== Singles ===
- (France) Ugo Humbert defeated (Russia) Andrey Rublev, 6–3, 7–6^{(7–4)}

=== Doubles ===
- (Germany) Kevin Krawietz / (Romania) Horia Tecău'defeated (Canada) Félix Auger-Aliassime / (Poland) Hubert Hurkacz, 7–6^{(7–4)}, 6–4

== Points and prize money ==
=== Points distribution ===
Event	W	F	SF	QF	Round of 16	Round of 32	Q	Q2	Q1
Singles	500	300	180	90	45	0	20	10	0
Doubles	500	300	180	90	45	0	45	25	0

=== Prize money ===
Event	W	F	SF	QF	Round of 16	Round of 32	Q2	Q1
Singles	€113,785	€84,075	€59,860	€40,765	€25,480	€14,650	€6,750	€3,565
Doubles*	€40,200	€30,240	€21,760	€14,340	€9,020	€5,000	—	—

_{*per team}

== ATP singles main-draw entrants ==
=== Seeds ===
Country	Player	Rank^{1}	Seed
RUS	Daniil Medvedev	2	1
~~GRE~~	~~Stefanos Tsitsipas~~	~~4~~	~~2~~
GER	Alexander Zverev	6	3
RUS	Andrey Rublev	7	4
SUI	Roger Federer	8	5
ESP	Roberto Bautista Agut	11	6
BEL	David Goffin	13	7
FRA	Gaël Monfils	15	8

- ^{1} Rankings are as of 31 May 2021.

=== Other entrants ===
The following players received wildcards into the main draw:

- (Germany) Daniel Altmaier
- (Germany) Philipp Kohlschreiber
- (France) Gaël Monfils
- ~~(Greece) Stefanos Tsitsipas~~

The following player received entry as a special exempt:

- (Austria) Jurij Rodionov

The following players received entry from the qualifying draw:

- (Georgia (country)) Nikoloz Basilashvili
- (Lithuania) Ričardas Berankis
- (United States) Marcos Giron
- (Belarus) Ilya Ivashka
- (Slovakia) Lukáš Lacko
- (France) Arthur Rinderknech

The following player received entry as a lucky loser:

- (Germany) Yannick Hanfmann

=== Withdrawals ===
Before the tournament

- (Spain) Pablo Carreño Busta → replaced by (France) Corentin Moutet
- (Chile) Cristian Garín → replaced by (France) Gilles Simon
- (Norway) Casper Ruud → replaced by (United States) Sam Querrey
- (Greece) Stefanos Tsitsipas → replaced by (Germany) Yannick Hanfmann

== ATP doubles main-draw entrants ==
=== Seeds ===
Country	Player	Country	Player	Rank^{1}	Seed
CRO	Ivan Dodig	SVK	Filip Polášek	19	1
POL	Łukasz Kubot	FRA	Édouard Roger-Vasselin	31	2
GER	Kevin Krawietz	ROU	Horia Tecău	39	3
NED	Wesley Koolhof	NED	Jean-Julien Rojer	40	4
GER	Tim Pütz	NZL	Michael Venus	53	5
BEL	Sander Gillé	BEL	Joran Vliegen	62	6
RSA	Raven Klaasen	JPN	Ben McLachlan	67	7
AUT	Oliver Marach	PAK	Aisam-ul-Haq Qureshi	84	8

- ^{1} Rankings are as of 31 May 2021.

=== Other entrants ===
The following pairs received wildcards into the doubles main draw:

- (Germany) Daniel Altmaier / (Switzerland) Dominic Stricker
- (Germany) Dustin Brown / (Germany) Jan-Lennard Struff
- ~~(Greece) Petros Tsitsipas / (Greece) Stefanos Tsitsipas~~

The following pair received entry from the qualifying draw:

- (Germany) Daniel Masur / (Germany) Rudolf Molleker

The following pair received entry as a lucky loser:

- (Germany) Yannick Hanfmann / (Germany) Dominik Koepfer

=== Withdrawals ===
Before the tournament

- (Spain) Marcel Granollers / (Argentina) Horacio Zeballos → replaced by (Argentina) Andrés Molteni / (Argentina) Guido Pella
- (Poland) Łukasz Kubot / (Brazil) Marcelo Melo → replaced by (Poland) Łukasz Kubot / (France) Édouard Roger-Vasselin
- (Greece) Petros Tsitsipas / (Greece) Stefanos Tsitsipas → replaced by (Germany) Yannick Hanfmann / (Germany) Dominik Koepfer
