= 2008 Gerry Weber Open – Doubles =

Doubles
- 2008 Gerry Weber Open

Final
- Champions: (Russia) Mikhail Youzhny (Germany) Mischa Zverev
- Runners-up: (Czech Republic) Lukáš Dlouhý (India) Leander Paes
- Score: 3–6, 6–4, [10–3]

Details
- Draw: 16
- Seeds: 4

Events
Singles	Doubles
← 2007 ·	Gerry Weber Open	· 2009 →

Simon Aspelin and Julian Knowle were the defending champions, but lost in the first round to Tomáš Berdych and Radek Štěpánek.

Mikhail Youzhny and Mischa Zverev won in the final 3–6, 6–4, [10–3], against Lukáš Dlouhý and Leander Paes.

== Seeds ==
1. (Israel) Jonathan Erlich / (Israel) Andy Ram (quarterfinals)
2. (Czech Republic) Martin Damm / (Czech Republic) Pavel Vízner (first round)
3. (Sweden) Simon Aspelin / (Austria) Julian Knowle (first round)
4. (Czech Republic) Lukáš Dlouhý / (India) Leander Paes (final)

== Draw ==
Key

- Q = Qualifier
- WC = Wild card
- LL = Lucky loser
- Alt = Alternate
- ITF = ITF entry
- PR = Protected ranking
- SR = Special ranking
- SE = Special exempt
- JE = Junior exempt
- JR = Junior Accelerator Programme entrant
- CO = College Accelerator Programme entrant
- NG = Next Gen Accelerator Program entrant
- w/o = Walkover
- r = Retired
- d = Defaulted

=== Draw ===
First round
1	(Israel) J Erlich (Israel) A Ram	6	7^{7}
(Sweden) R Lindstedt (Finland) J Nieminen	2	6^{4}
(Croatia) I Ljubičić (Sweden) R Söderling	6	7
(Germany) N Kiefer (Germany) P Kohlschreiber	3	5
4	(Czech Republic) L Dlouhý (India) L Paes	6	7^{8}
(Cyprus) M Baghdatis (Belgium) O Rochus	2	6^{6}
(France) J Benneteau (France) M Llodra	6	3	[15]
(Germany) M Berrer (Germany) T Haas	1	6	[17]
WC	(Germany) D Gremelmayr (Germany) R Schüttler	3	6	[7]
(Russia) M Youzhny (Germany) M Zverev	6	4	[10]
(Czech Republic) T Berdych (Czech Republic) R Štěpánek	6	4	[10]
3	(Sweden) S Aspelin (Austria) J Knowle	4	6	[6]
(France) M Gicquel (France) F Santoro	7^{8}	7^{7}
(United States) S Lipsky (United States) D Martin	6^{6}	6^{3}
WC	(Germany) C Kas (Germany) P Petzschner	6	7^{8}
2	(Czech Republic) M Damm (Czech Republic) P Vízner	4	6^{6}

Quarterfinals
1	(Israel) J Erlich (Israel) A Ram	3	6	[7]
(Croatia) I Ljubičić (Sweden) R Söderling	6	3	[10]
4	(Czech Republic) L Dlouhý (India) L Paes	6	6
(Germany) M Berrer (Germany) T Haas	3	4
(Russia) M Youzhny (Germany) M Zverev	w/o
(Czech Republic) T Berdych (Czech Republic) R Štěpánek
(France) M Gicquel (France) F Santoro	4	5
WC	(Germany) C Kas (Germany) P Petzschner	6	7

Semifinals
(Croatia) I Ljubičić (Sweden) R Söderling	4	6	[4]
4	(Czech Republic) L Dlouhý (India) L Paes	6	0	[10]
(Russia) M Youzhny (Germany) M Zverev	5	6	[10]
WC	(Germany) C Kas (Germany) P Petzschner	7	4	[7]

Final
4	(Czech Republic) L Dlouhý (India) L Paes	6	4	[3]
(Russia) M Youzhny (Germany) M Zverev	3	6	[10]
