= 2006 Gerry Weber Open – Doubles =

Doubles
- 2006 Gerry Weber Open

Final
- Champions: (France) Fabrice Santoro (Serbia) Nenad Zimonjić
- Runners-up: (Germany) Michael Kohlmann (Germany) Rainer Schüttler
- Score: 6–0, 6–4

Details
- Draw: 16
- Seeds: 4

Events
Singles	Doubles
← 2005 ·	Gerry Weber Open	· 2007 →

Yves Allegro and Roger Federer were the defending champions, but Federer chose not to participate, and only Allegro competed that year.
Allegro partnered with Marat Safin, but lost in the semifinals to Michael Kohlmann and Rainer Schüttler.

Fabrice Santoro and Nenad Zimonjić won in the final 6–0, 6–4, against Michael Kohlmann and Rainer Schüttler.

== Seeds ==
1. (Israel) Jonathan Erlich / (Israel) Andy Ram (quarterfinals)
2. (France) Fabrice Santoro / (Serbia) Nenad Zimonjić (champions)
3. (Czech Republic) Martin Damm / (India) Leander Paes (first round)
4. (Sweden) Simon Aspelin / (Australia) Todd Perry (first round)

== Draw ==
=== Key ===
- Q = Qualifier
- WC = Wild card
- LL = Lucky loser
- Alt = Alternate
- SE = Special exempt
- PR = Protected ranking
- ITF = ITF entry
- JE = Junior exempt
- w/o = Walkover
- r = Retired
- d = Defaulted
- SR = Special ranking

=== Draw ===
First round
1	(Israel) J Erlich (Israel) A Ram	7^{11}	7^{7}
(Czech Republic) J Levinský (Sweden) R Lindstedt	6^{9}	6^{5}
(Switzerland) Y Allegro (Russia) M Safin	6	4	[10]
(Cyprus) M Baghdatis (Belgium) O Rochus	4	6	[1]
4	(Sweden) S Aspelin (Australia) T Perry	6	6^{4}	[4]
WC	(Germany) M Kohlmann (Germany) R Schüttler	4	7^{7}	[10]
(Slovakia) M Mertiňák (Czech Republic) P Pála	6^{3}	2
ALT	(France) F Serra (France) G Simon	7^{7}	6
(Germany) T Haas (Germany) A Waske	1	6	[6]
(France) R Gasquet (Belgium) K Vliegen`	6	3	[10]
(South Africa) C Haggard (Czech Republic) J Novák	7^{9}	4	[10]
3	(Czech Republic) M Damm (India) L Paes	6^{7}	6	[8]
(Poland) M Fyrstenberg (Poland) M Matkowski	5	6^{9}
(Romania) A Pavel (Russia) M Youzhny	7	7^{11}
WC	(Germany) C Kas (Germany) P Petzschner	6	6^{5}	[8]
2	(France) F Santoro (Serbia) N Zimonjić	4	7^{7}	[10]

Quarterfinals
1	(Israel) J Erlich (Israel) A Ram	4	6	9
(Switzerland) Y Allegro (Russia) M Safin	6	1	[11]
WC	(Germany) M Kohlmann (Germany) R Schüttler	6	6
ALT	(France) F Serra (France) G Simon	0	1
(France) R Gasquet (Belgium) K Vliegen	w/o
(South Africa) C Haggard (Czech Republic) J Novák
(Romania) A Pavel (Russia) M Youzhny	7	6^{8}	[6]
2	(France) F Santoro (Serbia) N Zimonjić	5	7^{10}	[10]

Semifinals
(Switzerland) Y Allegro (Russia) M Safin	3	6	[10]
WC	(Germany) M Kohlmann (Germany) R Schüttler	6	3	[12]
(France) R Gasquet (Belgium) K Vliegen	6^{3}	4
2	(France) F Santoro (Serbia) N Zimonjić	7^{7}	6

Final
WC	(Germany) M Kohlmann (Germany) R Schüttler	0	4
2	(France) F Santoro (Serbia) N Zimonjić	6	6
