= 2015 Gerry Weber Open – Doubles =

Doubles
- 2015 Gerry Weber Open

Final
- Champions: (South Africa) Raven Klaasen (United States) Rajeev Ram
- Runners-up: (India) Rohan Bopanna (Romania) Florin Mergea
- Score: 7–6^{(7–5)}, 6–2

Details
- Draw: 16
- Seeds: 4

Events
Singles	Doubles
← 2014 ·	Gerry Weber Open	· 2016 →

Andre Begemann and Julian Knowle were the defending champions, but chose not to participate together. Begemann played alongside Florian Mayer, but lost in the first round to Dustin Brown and Jan-Lennard Struff. Knowle teamed up with Vasek Pospisil, but lost in the first round to Eric Butorac and Scott Lipsky.
Raven Klaasen and Rajeev Ram won the title, defeating Rohan Bopanna and Florin Mergea in the final, 7–6^{(7–5)}, 6–2.
The world's no.1 doubles pairing, the Bryan brothers, were originally slated to play the event. This would have been the Bryans' first-ever appearance at Halle, after over a decade of playing in the Queen's Club Championships prior to Wimbledon. However, the Bryans withdrew just prior to the start of the tournament.

== Seeds ==
1. (Netherlands) Jean-Julien Rojer / (Romania) Horia Tecău (semifinals)
2. (India) Rohan Bopanna / (Romania) Florin Mergea (finals)
3. (Austria) Julian Knowle / (Canada) Vasek Pospisil (first round)
4. (Uruguay) Pablo Cuevas / (Spain) David Marrero (quarterfinals)

== Draw ==
=== Key ===
- Q = Qualifier
- WC = Wild card
- LL = Lucky loser
- Alt = Alternate
- SE = Special exempt
- PR = Protected ranking
- ITF = ITF entry
- JE = Junior exempt
- w/o = Walkover
- r = Retired
- d = Defaulted
- SR = Special ranking

=== Draw ===
First round
1	(Netherlands) J-J Rojer (Romania) H Tecău	6	6
(Czech Republic) T Berdych (Czech Republic) J Veselý	4	4
PR	(Germany) A Begemann (Germany) F Mayer	6^{4}	3
WC	(Germany) D Brown (Germany) J-L Struff	7^{7}	6
4	(Uruguay) P Cuevas (Spain) D Marrero	6	6
(Latvia) E Gulbis (Austria) D Thiem	4	4
(South Africa) R Klaasen (United States) R Ram	7^{7}	7^{7}
PR	(Serbia) J Tipsarević (Australia) B Tomic	6^{2}	6^{3}
(United States) S Johnson (Japan) K Nishikori	3	4
(Sweden) R Lindstedt (Austria) J Melzer	6	6
(United States) E Butorac (United States) S Lipsky	6^{5}	6	[10]
3	(Austria) J Knowle (Canada) V Pospisil	7^{7}	4	[8]
WC	(Germany) A Zverev (Germany) M Zverev	3	2
(Croatia) M Draganja (Finland) H Kontinen	6	6
Q	(Czech Republic) L Rosol (Ukraine) S Stakhovsky	6	3	[8]
2	(India) R Bopanna (Romania) F Mergea	2	6	[10]

Quarterfinals
1	(Netherlands) J-J Rojer (Romania) H Tecău	6^{4}	6	[10]
WC	(Germany) D Brown (Germany) J-L Struff	7^{7}	1	[7]
4	(Uruguay) P Cuevas (Spain) D Marrero	6^{5}	4
(South Africa) R Klaasen (United States) R Ram	7^{7}	6
(Sweden) R Lindstedt (Austria) J Melzer	5	4
(United States) E Butorac (United States) S Lipsky	7	6
(Croatia) M Draganja (Finland) H Kontinen	6^{4}	6^{3}
2	(India) R Bopanna (Romania) F Mergea	7^{7}	7^{7}

Semifinals
1	(Netherlands) J-J Rojer (Romania) H Tecău	6^{5}	6	[9]
(South Africa) R Klaasen (United States) R Ram	7^{7}	3	[11]
(United States) E Butorac (United States) S Lipsky	6^{10}	6	[11]
2	(India) R Bopanna (Romania) F Mergea	7^{12}	4	[13]

Final
(South Africa) R Klaasen (United States) R Ram	7^{7}	6
2	(India) R Bopanna (Romania) F Mergea	6^{5}	2

== Qualifying ==
=== Seeds ===
1. (United States) Nicholas Monroe / (New Zealand) Artem Sitak (qualifying competition)
2. (Czech Republic) Lukáš Rosol / (Ukraine) Sergiy Stakhovsky (qualified)

=== Qualifiers ===
1. (Czech Republic) Lukáš Rosol / (Ukraine) Sergiy Stakhovsky

=== Qualifying draw ===
First round
1	(United States) Nicholas Monroe (New Zealand) Artem Sitak	6	7
WC	(Germany) Dominik Meffert (Germany) Philipp Petzschner	2	5
(Austria) Philipp Oswald (Italy) Andreas Seppi	6^{5}	3
2	(Czech Republic) Lukáš Rosol (Ukraine) Sergiy Stakhovsky	7^{7}	6

Qualifying competition
1	(United States) Nicholas Monroe (New Zealand) Artem Sitak	4	6^{10}
2	(Czech Republic) Lukáš Rosol (Ukraine) Sergiy Stakhovsky	6	7^{12}
