= 2014 Gerry Weber Open – Doubles =

Doubles
- 2014 Gerry Weber Open

Final
- Champions: (Germany) Andre Begemann (Austria) Julian Knowle
- Runners-up: (Switzerland) Marco Chiudinelli (Switzerland) Roger Federer
- Score: 1–6, 7–5, [12–10]

Details
- Draw: 16
- Seeds: 4

Events
Singles	Doubles
← 2013 ·	Gerry Weber Open	· 2015 →

Santiago González and Scott Lipsky were the defending champions, but lost to Andre Begemann and Julian Knowle in the first round.
Begemann and Knowle went on to win the title, defeating Marco Chiudinelli and Roger Federer in the final, 1–6, 7–5, [12–10].

== Seeds ==
1. (Poland) Łukasz Kubot / (Sweden) Robert Lindstedt (quarterfinals, withdrew)
2. (Colombia) Juan Sebastián Cabal / (Colombia) Robert Farah (withdrew)
3. (Netherlands) Jean-Julien Rojer / (Romania) Horia Tecău (first round)
4. (Mexico) Santiago González / (United States) Scott Lipsky (first round)

== Draw ==
=== Key ===
- Q = Qualifier
- WC = Wild card
- LL = Lucky loser
- Alt = Alternate
- SE = Special exempt
- PR = Protected ranking
- ITF = ITF entry
- JE = Junior exempt
- w/o = Walkover
- r = Retired
- d = Defaulted
- SR = Special ranking

=== Draw ===
First round
1	(Poland) Ł Kubot (Sweden) R Lindstedt	5	6	[10]
(Chinese Taipei) Y-h Lu (Austria) O Marach	7	3	[4]
(Germany) C Kas (Germany) P Kohlschreiber	3	7^{7}	[5]
(Croatia) M Draganja (Romania) F Mergea	6	6^{5}	[10]
4	(Mexico) S González (United States) S Lipsky	4	6	[6]
(Germany) A Begemann (Austria) J Knowle	6	2	[10]
(Netherlands) R Haase (Japan) K Nishikori	6	7^{9}
(Canada) M Raonic (Russia) M Youzhny	4	6^{7}
(Poland) T Bednarek (Sweden) J Brunström	6	3	[3]
WC	(Germany) D Brown (Germany) J-L Struff	2	6	[10]
(Croatia) I Karlović (Croatia) M Pavić	6^{6}	7^{7}	[10]
3	(Netherlands) J-J Rojer (Romania) H Tecău	7^{8}	6^{4}	[8]
WC	(Switzerland) M Chiudinelli (Switzerland) R Federer	w/o
(Germany) M Emmrich (Italy) A Seppi
(Colombia) A Falla (Colombia) S Giraldo	3
Alt	(Germany) B Becker (Russia) T Gabashvili	2^{r}

Quarterfinals
1	(Poland) Ł Kubot (Sweden) R Lindstedt
(Croatia) M Draganja (Romania) F Mergea	w/o
(Germany) A Begemann (Austria) J Knowle	6	6
(Netherlands) R Haase (Japan) K Nishikori	3	4
WC	(Germany) D Brown (Germany) J-L Struff	4	6	[10]
(Croatia) I Karlović (Croatia) M Pavić	6	4	[6]
WC	(Switzerland) M Chiudinelli (Switzerland) R Federer	6	6
(Colombia) A Falla (Colombia) S Giraldo	3	3

Semifinals
(Croatia) M Draganja (Romania) F Mergea	3	6^{3}
(Germany) A Begemann (Austria) J Knowle	6	7^{7}
WC	(Germany) D Brown (Germany) J-L Struff	5	3
WC	(Switzerland) M Chiudinelli (Switzerland) R Federer	7	6

Final
(Germany) A Begemann (Austria) J Knowle	1	7	[12]
WC	(Switzerland) M Chiudinelli (Switzerland) R Federer	6	5	[10]
