= 2009 Gerry Weber Open – Doubles =

Doubles
- 2009 Gerry Weber Open

Final
- Champions: (Germany) Christopher Kas (Germany) Philipp Kohlschreiber
- Runners-up: (Germany) Andreas Beck (Switzerland) Marco Chiudinelli
- Score: 6–3, 6–4

Details
- Draw: 16
- Seeds: 4

Events
Singles	Doubles
← 2008 ·	Gerry Weber Open	· 2010 →

Mikhail Youzhny and Mischa Zverev were the defending champions, but Youzhny chose not to participate, and only Zverev competed that year.
Zverev partnered with Nicolas Kiefer, but they withdrew before their semifinal match against Andreas Beck and Marco Chiudinelli, due to an abdominal muscle tear for Kiefer.

Christopher Kas and Philipp Kohlschreiber won in the final 6–3, 6–4, against Andreas Beck and Marco Chiudinelli.

== Seeds ==
1. (Czech Republic) Lukáš Dlouhý / (India) Leander Paes (withdrew due to fatigue)
2. (Czech Republic) František Čermák / (Slovakia) Michal Mertiňák (first round)
3. (Czech Republic) Martin Damm / (Sweden) Robert Lindstedt (first round)
4. (Germany) Philipp Petzschner / (Austria) Alexander Peya (first round)

== Draw ==
=== Key ===
- Q = Qualifier
- WC = Wild card
- LL = Lucky loser
- Alt = Alternate
- SE = Special exempt
- PR = Protected ranking
- ITF = ITF entry
- JE = Junior exempt
- w/o = Walkover
- r = Retired
- d = Defaulted
- SR = Special ranking

=== Draw ===
First round
ALT	(Netherlands) R Wassen (Slovakia) I Zelenay	3	2
(France) M Gicquel (France) J-W Tsonga	6	6
WC	(Germany) A Beck (Switzerland) M Chiudinelli	4	6	[10]
(Russia) I Kunitsyn (Russia) D Tursunov	6	3	[7]
3	(Czech Republic) M Damm (Sweden) R Lindstedt	4	6^{2}
(Germany) N Kiefer (Germany) M Zverev	6	7^{7}
(Serbia) N Djokovic (Serbia) V Troicki	7	3	[10]
(Austria) J Knowle (Austria) J Melzer	5	6	[6]
(France) A Clément (Germany) R Schüttler	6	6
(France) F Santoro (France) F Serra	3	2
(Germany) C Kas (Germany) P Kohlschreiber	1	6	[10]
4	(Germany) P Petzschner (Austria) A Peya	6	3	[7]
(United States) J Cerretani (Romania) V Hănescu	6^{12}	4
WC	(Germany) T Haas (Germany) M Kohlmann	7^{14}	6
(Czech Republic) T Berdych (Serbia) D Vemić	6	6
2	(Czech Republic) F Čermák (Slovakia) M Mertiňák	1	2

Quarterfinals
(France) M Gicquel (France) J-W Tsonga	4	6	[8]
WC	(Germany) A Beck (Switzerland) M Chiudinelli	6	1	[10]
(Germany) N Kiefer (Germany) M Zverev	6	6
(Serbia) N Djokovic (Serbia) V Troicki	1	1
(France) A Clément (Germany) R Schüttler	6	1	[11]
(Germany) C Kas (Germany) P Kohlschreiber	3	6	[13]
WC	(Germany) T Haas (Germany) M Kohlmann	6^{5}	6	[10]
(Czech Republic) T Berdych (Serbia) D Vemić	7^{7}	4	[4]

Semifinals
WC	(Germany) A Beck (Switzerland) M Chiudinelli	w/o
(Germany) N Kiefer (Germany) M Zverev
(Germany) C Kas (Germany) P Kohlschreiber	7^{10}	6
WC	(Germany) T Haas (Germany) M Kohlmann	6^{8}	1

Final
WC	(Germany) A Beck (Switzerland) M Chiudinelli	3	4
(Germany) C Kas (Germany) P Kohlschreiber	6	6
