= 2015 Gerry Weber Open – Singles =

Singles
- 2015 Gerry Weber Open

Final
- Champion: (Switzerland) Roger Federer
- Runner-up: (Italy) Andreas Seppi
- Score: 7–6^{(7–1)}, 6–4

Details
- Draw: 32
- Seeds: 8

Events
Singles	Doubles
- Gerry Weber Open

Roger Federer was the two-time defending champion and successfully defended his title, defeating Andreas Seppi in the final, 7–6^{(7–1)}, 6–4. It was his record-extending eighth title at the tournament.

== Seeds ==
1. (Switzerland) Roger Federer (champion)
2. (Japan) Kei Nishikori (semifinals, retired)
3. (Czech Republic) Tomáš Berdych (quarterfinals)
4. (France) Gaël Monfils (quarterfinals, retired)
5. (Spain) Tommy Robredo (second round)
6. (Uruguay) Pablo Cuevas (first round)
7. (Australia) Bernard Tomic (first round)
8. (Croatia) Ivo Karlović (semifinals)

== Draw ==
Key

- Q = Qualifier
- WC = Wild card
- LL = Lucky loser
- Alt = Alternate
- ITF = ITF entry
- PR = Protected ranking
- SR = Special ranking
- SE = Special exempt
- JE = Junior exempt
- JR = Junior Accelerator Programme entrant
- CO = College Accelerator Programme entrant
- NG = Next Gen Accelerator Program entrant
- w/o = Walkover
- r = Retired
- d = Defaulted

=== Finals ===
Semifinals
1	(Switzerland) Roger Federer	7^{7}	7^{7}
8	(Croatia) Ivo Karlović	6^{3}	6^{4}
(Italy) Andreas Seppi	4
2	(Japan) Kei Nishikori	1^{r}

Final
1	(Switzerland) Roger Federer	7^{7}	6
(Italy) Andreas Seppi	6^{1}	4

=== Top half ===
First round
1	(Switzerland) R Federer	7^{10}	3	7^{7}
(Germany) P Kohlschreiber	6^{8}	6	6^{5}
(Latvia) E Gulbis	6	7^{7}
(Ukraine) S Stakhovsky	4	6^{3}
WC	(Germany) J-L Struff	2	6	6^{5}
PR	(Germany) F Mayer	6	0	7^{7}
(United States) S Johnson	6	7^{7}
7	(Australia) B Tomic	3	6^{4}
3	(Czech Republic) T Berdych	7	6
(Dominican Republic) V Estrella Burgos	5	3
(United States) D Young	4	6	3
(Croatia) B Ćorić	6	3	6
WC	(Germany) A Zverev	6	6
Q	(Finland) J Nieminen	4	4
(Colombia) S Giraldo	7^{7}	4	4
8	(Croatia) I Karlović	6^{4}	6	6

Second round
1	(Switzerland) R Federer	6	7
(Latvia) E Gulbis	3	5
PR	(Germany) F Mayer	6	7^{7}
(United States) S Johnson	3	6^{4}
3	(Czech Republic) T Berdych	6	6
(Croatia) B Ćorić	3	2
WC	(Germany) A Zverev	7^{7}	3	3
8	(Croatia) I Karlović	6^{5}	6	6

Quarterfinals
1	(Switzerland) R Federer	6	7^{7}
PR	(Germany) F Mayer	0	6^{1}
3	(Czech Republic) T Berdych	5	7^{10}	3
8	(Croatia) I Karlović	7	6^{8}	6

Semifinals
1	(Switzerland) R Federer	7^{7}	7^{7}
8	(Croatia) I Karlović	6^{3}	6^{4}

=== Bottom half ===
First round
5	(Spain) T Robredo	6	6^{4}	7^{7}
Q	(Lithuania) R Berankis	4	7^{7}	6^{1}
(Italy) A Seppi	7	6
PR	(Germany) T Haas	5	2
(Czech Republic) J Veselý	1	7^{9}	5
(Kazakhstan) M Kukushkin	6	6^{7}	7
(Czech Republic) L Rosol	3	4
4	(France) G Monfils	6	6
6	(Uruguay) P Cuevas	3	4
(Poland) J Janowicz	6	6
Q	(Colombia) A Falla	6	3	6
Q	(Slovakia) L Lacko	4	6	1
WC	(Germany) D Brown	7	6
(Austria) A Haider-Maurer	5	2
(Austria) D Thiem	6^{4}	5
2	(Japan) K Nishikori	7^{7}	7

Second round
5	(Spain) T Robredo	2	7^{8}	3
(Italy) A Seppi	6	6^{6}	6
(Kazakhstan) M Kukushkin	6^{1}	4
4	(France) G Monfils	7^{7}	6
(Poland) J Janowicz	6	5	6
Q	(Colombia) A Falla	2	7	2
WC	(Germany) D Brown	5	1
2	(Japan) K Nishikori	7	6

Quarterfinals
(Italy) A Seppi	6	1
4	(France) G Monfils	1	0^{r}
(Poland) J Janowicz	4	7	3
2	(Japan) K Nishikori	6	5	6

Semifinals
(Italy) A Seppi	4
2	(Japan) K Nishikori	1^{r}

== Qualifying ==
=== Seeds ===
1. (Canada) Vasek Pospisil (qualifying competition)
2. (France) Benoît Paire (first round)
3. (Finland) Jarkko Nieminen (qualified)
4. (Slovakia) Lukáš Lacko (qualified)
5. (Lithuania) Ričardas Berankis (qualified)
6. (Belgium) Ruben Bemelmans (first round)
7. (Colombia) Alejandro Falla (qualified)
8. (Japan) Tatsuma Ito (qualifying competition)

=== Qualifiers ===
1. (Lithuania) Ričardas Berankis
2. (Colombia) Alejandro Falla
3. (Finland) Jarkko Nieminen
4. (Slovakia) Lukáš Lacko

=== Qualifying draw ===
==== First qualifier ====
First round
1	(Canada) Vasek Pospisil	6	6
(Germany) Matthias Bachinger	2	0
(United States) Austin Krajicek	4	7	4
5/Alt	(Lithuania) Ričardas Berankis	6	5	6

Qualifying competition
1	(Canada) Vasek Pospisil	3	3
5/Alt	(Lithuania) Ričardas Berankis	6	6

==== Second qualifier ====
First round
2	(France) Benoît Paire	6	6^{1}	2
WC	(Germany) Tim Pütz	3	7^{7}	6
WC	(Serbia) Janko Tipsarević	2	4
7	(Colombia) Alejandro Falla	6	6

Qualifying competition
WC	(Germany) Tim Pütz	3	1
7	(Colombia) Alejandro Falla	6	6

==== Third qualifier ====
First round
3	(Finland) Jarkko Nieminen	7^{7}	7
(Serbia) Filip Krajinović	6^{5}	5
(United States) Ryan Harrison	4	2
8	(Japan) Tatsuma Ito	6	6

Qualifying competition
3	(Finland) Jarkko Nieminen	6	6
8	(Japan) Tatsuma Ito	3	4

==== Fourth qualifier ====
First round
4	(Slovakia) Lukáš Lacko	7^{7}	3	6
WC	(Germany) Peter Gojowczyk	6^{5}	6	4
(Austria) Jürgen Melzer	3	6	7^{7}
6	(Belgium) Ruben Bemelmans	6	3	6^{2}

Qualifying competition
4	(Slovakia) Lukáš Lacko	4	6	7
(Austria) Jürgen Melzer	6	3	5
