= 2012 Gerry Weber Open – Doubles =

Doubles
- 2012 Gerry Weber Open

Final
- Champions: (Pakistan) Aisam-ul-Haq Qureshi (Netherlands) Jean-Julien Rojer
- Runners-up: (Philippines) Treat Conrad Huey (United States) Scott Lipsky
- Score: 6–3, 6–4

Details
- Draw: 16
- Seeds: 4

Events
Singles	Doubles
← 2011 ·	Gerry Weber Open	· 2013 →

Rohan Bopanna and Aisam-ul-Haq Qureshi were the defending champions but Bopanna decided not to participate.
Qureshi plays alongside Jean-Julien Rojer and won the title beating Treat Conrad Huey and Scott Lipsky in the final, 6–3, 6–4.

== Seeds ==
1. (Pakistan) Aisam-ul-Haq Qureshi / (Netherlands) Jean-Julien Rojer (champions)
2. (Czech Republic) František Čermák / (Austria) Julian Knowle (quarterfinals)
3. (Germany) Dustin Brown / (Austria) Oliver Marach (first round)
4. (Spain) Marcel Granollers / (Spain) Rafael Nadal (quarterfinals, withdrew)

== Draw ==
=== Key ===
- Q = Qualifier
- WC = Wild card
- LL = Lucky loser
- Alt = Alternate
- SE = Special exempt
- PR = Protected ranking
- ITF = ITF entry
- JE = Junior exempt
- w/o = Walkover
- r = Retired
- d = Defaulted
- SR = Special ranking

=== Draw ===
First round
1	(Pakistan) A-u-H Qureshi (Netherlands) J-J Rojer	6	6^{2}	[12]
(Germany) B Becker (Germany) P Petzschner	4	7^{7}	[10]
WC	(Germany) T Haas (Germany) A Waske	4	2
(Sweden) J Brunström (Germany) P Marx	6	6
3	(Germany) D Brown (Austria) O Marach	6	2	[9]
(Canada) M Raonic (Canada) A Shamasdin	4	6	[11]
(Poland) Ł Kubot (Russia) M Youzhny	6	4	[10]
WC	(Switzerland) M Chiudinelli (Germany) M Zverev	3	6	[3]
(Netherlands) R Haase (Finland) J Nieminen	7^{7}	4	[7]
(Germany) M Kohlmann (Germany) F Mayer	6^{2}	6	[10]
(Slovakia) M Mertiňák (Serbia) V Troicki	7	2	[8]
4	(Spain) M Granollers (Spain) R Nadal	5	6	[10]
(Philippines) TC Huey (United States) S Lipsky	3	6	[10]
(Germany) C Kas (Germany) P Kohlschreiber	6	3	[5]
(Argentina) C Berlocq (Italy) A Seppi	6^{6}	7^{7}	[3]
2	(Czech Republic) F Čermák (Austria) J Knowle	7^{8}	6^{5}	[10]

Quarterfinals
1	(Pakistan) A-u-H Qureshi (Netherlands) J-J Rojer	7^{9}	6^{1}	[10]
(Sweden) J Brunström (Germany) P Marx	6^{7}	7^{7}	[7]
(Canada) M Raonic (Canada) A Shamasdin	3	5
(Poland) Ł Kubot (Russia) M Youzhny	6	7
(Germany) M Kohlmann (Germany) F Mayer	w/o
4	(Spain) M Granollers (Spain) R Nadal
(Philippines) TC Huey (United States) S Lipsky	6	5	[10]
2	(Czech Republic) F Čermák (Austria) J Knowle	3	7	[6]

Semifinals
1	(Pakistan) A-u-H Qureshi (Netherlands) J-J Rojer	6	6
(Poland) Ł Kubot (Russia) M Youzhny	2	4
(Germany) M Kohlmann (Germany) F Mayer	6^{4}	4
(Philippines) TC Huey (United States) S Lipsky	7^{7}	6

Final
1	(Pakistan) A-u-H Qureshi (Netherlands) J-J Rojer	6	6
(Philippines) TC Huey (United States) S Lipsky	3	4
