= 2014 Gerry Weber Open – Singles =

Singles
- 2014 Gerry Weber Open

Final
- Champion: (Switzerland) Roger Federer
- Runner-up: (Colombia) Alejandro Falla
- Score: 7–6^{(7–2)}, 7–6^{(7–3)}

Details
- Draw: 28
- Seeds: 8

Events
Singles	Doubles
- Gerry Weber Open

The defending champion, Roger Federer, successfully defended his title, defeating Alejandro Falla in the final, 7–6^{(7–2)}, 7–6^{(7–3)}. It was his record-extending seventh title at the tournament.

== Seeds ==
The top four seeds received a bye into the second round.

1. (Spain) Rafael Nadal (second round)
2. (Switzerland) Roger Federer (champion)
3. (Canada) Milos Raonic (second round)
4. (Japan) Kei Nishikori (semifinals)
5. (France) Richard Gasquet (first round)
6. (Russia) Mikhail Youzhny (first round)
7. (Germany) Tommy Haas (withdrew because of a right shoulder injury)
8. (Poland) Jerzy Janowicz (first round)

== Draw ==
Key

- Q = Qualifier
- WC = Wild card
- LL = Lucky loser
- Alt = Alternate
- ITF = ITF entry
- PR = Protected ranking
- SR = Special ranking
- SE = Special exempt
- JE = Junior exempt
- JR = Junior Accelerator Programme entrant
- CO = College Accelerator Programme entrant
- NG = Next Gen Accelerator Program entrant
- w/o = Walkover
- r = Retired
- d = Defaulted

=== Finals ===
Semifinals
(Germany) Philipp Kohlschreiber	7	6^{5}	4
(Colombia) Alejandro Falla	5	7^{7}	6
4	(Japan) Kei Nishikori	3	6^{4}
2	(Switzerland) Roger Federer	6	7^{7}

Final
(Colombia) Alejandro Falla	6^{2}	6^{3}
2	(Switzerland) Roger Federer	7^{7}	7^{7}

=== Top half ===
First round
WC	(Germany) D Brown	6	6
Q	(Russia) A Kuznetsov	3	4
(Italy) A Seppi	3	4
(Germany) P Kohlschreiber	6	6
Q	(France) P-H Herbert	7^{7}	6
8	(Poland) J Janowicz	6^{5}	2
WC	(Germany) P Gojowczyk	7	6
(Poland) M Przysiężny	5	4
(Colombia) A Falla	6	3	6
(Poland) Ł Kubot	2	6	3
(Netherlands) R Haase	6	6
5	(France) R Gasquet	4	4

Second round
1	(Spain) R Nadal	4	1
WC	(Germany) D Brown	6	6
(Germany) P Kohlschreiber	6	6
Q	(France) P-H Herbert	2	4
3	(Canada) M Raonic	4	4
WC	(Germany) P Gojowczyk	6	6
(Colombia) A Falla	7^{7}	6
(Netherlands) R Haase	6^{1}	4

Quarterfinals
WC	(Germany) D Brown	4	7	6^{16}
(Germany) P Kohlschreiber	6	5	7^{18}
WC	(Germany) P Gojowczyk	6^{4}	6^{2}
(Colombia) A Falla	7^{7}	7^{7}

Semifinals
(Germany) P Kohlschreiber	7	6^{5}	4
(Colombia) A Falla	5	7^{7}	6

=== Bottom half ===
First round
LL	(France) A Olivetti	4	2
(United States) S Johnson	6	6
Q	(Ukraine) I Marchenko	7^{11}	4	6^{4}
(Russia) T Gabashvili	6^{9}	6	7^{7}
(France) G Monfils	6	7
(Germany) B Becker	1	5
6	(Russia) M Youzhny	3	4
(Croatia) I Karlović	6	6
(Chinese Taipei) Y-h Lu	7^{7}	6^{11}	7^{7}
Q	(Croatia) M Pavić	6^{2}	7^{13}	6^{5}
WC	(Germany) J-L Struff	4	2
(Portugal) J Sousa	6	6

Second round
(United States) S Johnson	w/o
(Russia) T Gabashvili
(France) G Monfils	1	6	3
4	(Japan) K Nishikori	6	3	6
(Croatia) I Karlović	6^{2}	6^{3}
(Chinese Taipei) Y-h Lu	7^{7}	7^{7}
(Portugal) J Sousa	7^{10}	4	2
2	(Switzerland) R Federer	6^{8}	6	6

Quarterfinals
(United States) S Johnson	1	6^{4}
4	(Japan) K Nishikori	6	7^{7}
(Chinese Taipei) Y-h Lu
2	(Switzerland) R Federer	w/o

Semifinals
4	(Japan) K Nishikori	3	6^{4}
2	(Switzerland) R Federer	6	7^{7}

== Qualifying ==
=== Seeds ===
The top six seeds receive a bye into the second round.

1. (Russia) Andrey Kuznetsov (qualified)
2. (France) Pierre-Hugues Herbert (qualified)
3. (Lithuania) Ričardas Berankis (second round)
4. (France) Albano Olivetti (qualifying competition, Lucky loser)
5. (Ukraine) Illya Marchenko (qualified)
6. (Switzerland) Marco Chiudinelli (second round)
7. (Czech Republic) Jan Hernych (second round)
8. (Australia) Alex Bolt (second round)

=== Qualifiers ===
1. (Russia) Andrey Kuznetsov
2. (France) Pierre-Hugues Herbert
3. (Ukraine) Illya Marchenko
4. (Croatia) Mate Pavić

=== Lucky losers ===
1. (France) Albano Olivetti

=== Qualifying draw ===
==== First qualifier ====
First round			Second round				Qualifying competition
			1	(Russia) Andrey Kuznetsov	6	6
(Bosnia and Herzegovina) Mirza Bašić	6	6		(Bosnia and Herzegovina) Mirza Bašić	3	4
(Australia) Omar Jasika	4	2					1	(Russia) Andrey Kuznetsov	6	6
(Austria) Gibril Diarra	6^{3}	3						(Mexico) Santiago González	3	3
(Mexico) Santiago González	7^{7}	6		(Mexico) Santiago González	6	6
			6	(Switzerland) Marco Chiudinelli	4	2

==== Second qualifier ====
First round
(Switzerland) Yann Marti	6	3	6
(Germany) Tim Pütz	0	6	4
(Germany) Maximilian Dinslaken	3	5
(Belgium) Olivier Rochus	6	7
(United States) Scott Lipsky	2^{r}
7	(Czech Republic) Jan Hernych	3

Second round
2	(France) Pierre-Hugues Herbert	6	6
(Switzerland) Yann Marti	3	2
(Belgium) Olivier Rochus	3	6	6
7	(Czech Republic) Jan Hernych	6	3	4

Qualifying competition
2	(France) Pierre-Hugues Herbert	6	6
(Belgium) Olivier Rochus	3	3

==== Third qualifier ====
First round				Second round				Qualifying competition
				3	(Lithuania) Ričardas Berankis	2	6^{7}
(Ecuador) Giovanni Lapentti	6	6^{3}	6		(Ecuador) Giovanni Lapentti	6	7^{9}
(Germany) Mats Moraings	0	7^{7}	4						(Ecuador) Giovanni Lapentti	4	3
(Croatia) Neven Krivokuća	4	6	2					5	(Ukraine) Illya Marchenko	6	6
(Germany) Lennart Zynga	6	3	6		(Germany) Lennart Zynga	3	4
				5	(Ukraine) Illya Marchenko	6	6

==== Fourth qualifier ====
First round
(Bulgaria) Alexandar Lazov	3	6	6
(Germany) Matthias Wunner	6	2	0
(Croatia) Mate Pavić	6	1	6
(Germany) Matthias Bachinger	4	6	4
(Germany) Philipp Scholz	1	2
8	(Australia) Alex Bolt	6	6

Second round
4	(France) Albano Olivetti	6	6
(Bulgaria) Alexandar Lazov	2	4
(Croatia) Mate Pavić	7	6
8	(Australia) Alex Bolt	5	2

Qualifying competition
4	(France) Albano Olivetti	6^{5}	6^{2}
(Croatia) Mate Pavić	7^{7}	7^{7}
