= 2007 Gerry Weber Open – Doubles =

Doubles
- 2007 Gerry Weber Open

Final
- Champions: (Sweden) Simon Aspelin (Austria) Julian Knowle
- Runners-up: (France) Fabrice Santoro (Serbia) Nenad Zimonjić
- Score: 6–4, 7–6^{(7–5)}

Details
- Draw: 16
- Seeds: 4

Events
Singles	Doubles
← 2006 ·	Gerry Weber Open	· 2008 →

Fabrice Santoro and Nenad Zimonjić were the defending champions, but Simon Aspelin and Julian Knowle defeated them 6–4, 7–6^{(7–5)}, in the final.

== Seeds ==
1. (Czech Republic) Martin Damm / (India) Leander Paes (quarterfinals)
2. (France) Fabrice Santoro / (Serbia) Nenad Zimonjić (final)
3. (Sweden) Simon Aspelin / (Austria) Julian Knowle (champions)
4. (Austria) Jürgen Melzer / (Russia) Mikhail Youzhny (quarterfinals)

== Draw ==
=== Key ===
- Q = Qualifier
- WC = Wild card
- LL = Lucky loser
- Alt = Alternate
- SE = Special exempt
- PR = Protected ranking
- ITF = ITF entry
- JE = Junior exempt
- w/o = Walkover
- r = Retired
- d = Defaulted
- SR = Special ranking

=== Draw ===
First round
1	(Czech Republic) M Damm (India) L Paes	6	6
(Switzerland) Y Allegro (Germany) M Kohlmann	4	2
(Germany) P Kohlschreiber (Sweden) R Söderling	6	7
WC	(Germany) B Becker (Germany) C Kas	4	5
3	(Sweden) S Aspelin (Austria) J Knowle	6	6
(Cyprus) M Baghdatis (Switzerland) S Wawrinka	4	2
WC	(Germany) N Kiefer (Romania) A Pavel	7	7
(United States) J Blake (United States) M Russell	5	5
(Poland) M Matkowski (Belgium) K Vliegen	4	0
(Sweden) R Lindstedt (Finland) J Nieminen	6	6
(South Africa) W Moodie (Australia) T Perry	6	4	[7]
4	(Austria) J Melzer (Russia) M Youzhny	3	6	[10]
(France) R Gasquet (Belgium) O Rochus	6	6
(Czech Republic) T Berdych (Czech Republic) P Pála	3	4
(France) M Gicquel (France) G Simon	4	5
2	(France) F Santoro (Serbia) N Zimonjić	6	7

Quarterfinals
1	(Czech Republic) M Damm (India) L Paes	6^{8}	7^{12}	[10]
(Germany) P Kohlschreiber (Sweden) R Söderling	7^{10}	6^{10}	[7]
3	(Sweden) S Aspelin (Austria) J Knowle	7	7^{7}
WC	(Germany) N Kiefer (Romania) A Pavel	5	6^{5}
(Sweden) R Lindstedt (Finland) J Nieminen	w/o
4	(Austria) J Melzer (Russia) M Youzhny
(France) R Gasquet (Belgium) O Rochus	2	4
2	(France) F Santoro (Serbia) N Zimonjić	6	6

Semifinals
1	(Czech Republic) M Damm (India) L Paes	3	6	[6]
3	(Sweden) S Aspelin (Austria) J Knowle	6	2	[10]
(Sweden) R Lindstedt (Finland) J Nieminen	3	4
2	(France) F Santoro (Serbia) N Zimonjić	6	6

Final
3	(Sweden) S Aspelin (Austria) J Knowle	6	7^{7}
2	(France) F Santoro (Serbia) N Zimonjić	4	6^{5}
