= 2011 Gerry Weber Open – Singles =

Singles
- 2011 Gerry Weber Open

Final
- Champion: (Germany) Philipp Kohlschreiber
- Runner-up: (Germany) Philipp Petzschner
- Score: 7–6^{(7–5)}, 2–0 ret.

Details
- Draw: 32
- Seeds: 8

Events
Singles	Doubles
- Gerry Weber Open

Lleyton Hewitt was the defending champion, but lost to Philipp Kohlschreiber in the quarterfinals.

Kohlschreiber won the tournament, defeating Philipp Petzschner in an all-German final, the first in the tournament's history, after Petzschner retired in the second set at a score of 7–6, 2–0.

== Seeds ==
1. (Switzerland) Roger Federer (withdrew due to groin injury)
2. (Czech Republic) Tomáš Berdych (semifinals)
3. (France) Gaël Monfils (semifinals)
4. (Russia) Mikhail Youzhny (withdrew due to left foot injury)
5. (Serbia) Viktor Troicki (quarterfinals)
6. (Germany) Florian Mayer (quarterfinals)
7. (Ukraine) Alexandr Dolgopolov (second round)
8. (Canada) Milos Raonic (quarterfinals)

== Draw ==
Key

- Q = Qualifier
- WC = Wild card
- LL = Lucky loser
- Alt = Alternate
- ITF = ITF entry
- PR = Protected ranking
- SR = Special ranking
- SE = Special exempt
- JE = Junior exempt
- JR = Junior Accelerator Programme entrant
- CO = College Accelerator Programme entrant
- NG = Next Gen Accelerator Program entrant
- w/o = Walkover
- r = Retired
- d = Defaulted

=== Finals ===
Semifinals
(Germany) Philipp Kohlschreiber	6	6
3	(France) Gaël Monfils	3	3
(Germany) Philipp Petzschner	7^{9}	2	6
2	(Czech Republic) Tomáš Berdych	6^{7}	6	3

Final
(Germany) Philipp Kohlschreiber	7^{7}	2
(Germany) Philipp Petzschner	6^{5}	0^{r}

=== Top half ===
First round
LL	(Argentina) L Mayer	2	3
(Australia) L Hewitt	6	6
(Italy) A Seppi	6	6^{6}	6
WC	(Germany) T Haas	2	7^{8}	3
(Germany) P Kohlschreiber	6	3	6
Q	(Germany) C-M Stebe	4	6	1
(Netherlands) R Haase	7^{7}	4	4
7	(Ukraine) A Dolgopolov	6^{4}	6	6
3	(France) G Monfils	6	6
Q	(France) F Serra	4	3
(Spain) P Riba	6^{4}	6^{6}
(Croatia) I Dodig	7^{7}	7^{8}
(Finland) J Nieminen	6^{2}	3
(Chinese Taipei) Y-h Lu	7^{7}	6
WC	(Germany) D Brown	6^{6}	6	3
6	(Germany) F Mayer	7^{8}	2	6

Second round
(Australia) L Hewitt	6	6
(Italy) A Seppi	4	4
(Germany) P Kohlschreiber	6	7^{7}
7	(Ukraine) A Dolgopolov	3	6^{5}
3	(France) G Monfils	6	6
(Croatia) I Dodig	2	3
(Chinese Taipei) Y-h Lu	6^{4}	6	4
6	(Germany) F Mayer	7^{7}	3	6

Quarterfinals
(Australia) L Hewitt	6^{4}	3
(Germany) P Kohlschreiber	7^{7}	6
3	(France) G Monfils	6	6
6	(Germany) F Mayer	4	4

Semifinals
(Germany) P Kohlschreiber	6	6
3	(France) G Monfils	3	3

=== Bottom half ===
First round
8	(Canada) M Raonic	6	6
(Spain) P Andújar	3	1
(Germany) T Kamke	4
(Germany) J Reister	3^{r}
(Kazakhstan) A Golubev	6	6^{5}	2
(Spain) D Gimeno-Traver	1	7^{7}	6
(Germany) P Petzschner	6	7^{7}
LL	(Germany) D Meffert	2	6^{5}
5	(Serbia) V Troicki	6	6
WC	(Germany) M Zverev	2	3
(Russia) I Andreev	6	6
(Italy) P Starace	4	4
(Ukraine) S Stakhovsky	3	7^{7}	6^{8}
Q	(Czech Republic) J Hernych	6	6^{5}	7^{10}
Q	(Belgium) R Bemelmans	7	6^{8}	4
2	(Czech Republic) T Berdych	5	7^{10}	6

Second round
8	(Canada) M Raonic	7^{7}	6
(Germany) T Kamke	6^{2}	3
(Spain) D Gimeno-Traver	2	4
(Germany) P Petzschner	6	6
5	(Serbia) V Troicki	6	6
(Russia) I Andreev	3	1
Q	(Czech Republic) J Hernych	3	6^{7}
2	(Czech Republic) T Berdych	6	7

Quarterfinals
8	(Canada) M Raonic	3	7^{8}	3
(Germany) P Petzschner	6	6^{6}	6
5	(Serbia) V Troicki	6^{3}	1
2	(Czech Republic) T Berdych	7^{7}	6

Semifinals
(Germany) P Petzschner	7^{9}	2	6
2	(Czech Republic) T Berdych	6^{7}	6	3
