= 2004 Gerry Weber Open – Doubles =

Doubles
- 2004 Gerry Weber Open

Final
- Champions: (India) Leander Paes (Czech Republic) David Rikl
- Runners-up: (Czech Republic) Tomáš Cibulec (Czech Republic) Petr Pála
- Score: 6–2, 7–5

Details
- Draw: 16
- Seeds: 4

Events
Singles	Doubles
← 2003 ·	Gerry Weber Open	· 2005 →

Jonas Björkman and Todd Woodbridge were the defending champions, but lost in the first round this year.

Leander Paes and David Rikl won in the final 6–2, 7–5, against Tomáš Cibulec and Petr Pála.

== Seeds ==
1. (Sweden) Jonas Björkman / (Australia) Todd Woodbridge (first round)
2. (Czech Republic) Martin Damm / (Czech Republic) Cyril Suk (quarterfinals)
3. (India) Leander Paes / (Czech Republic) David Rikl (champions)
4. (Israel) Jonathan Erlich / (Israel) Andy Ram (semifinals)

== Draw ==
=== Key ===
- Q = Qualifier
- WC = Wild card
- LL = Lucky loser
- Alt = Alternate
- SE = Special exempt
- PR = Protected ranking
- ITF = ITF entry
- JE = Junior exempt
- w/o = Walkover
- r = Retired
- d = Defaulted
- SR = Special ranking

=== Draw ===
First round
1	(Sweden) J Björkman (Australia) T Woodbridge	5	6^{7}
(United States) M Fish (Romania) A Pavel	7	7^{9}
(Spain) F López (Armenia) S Sargsian	6	6
(Australia) T Perry (Netherlands) M Verkerk	4	4
3	(India) L Paes (Czech Republic) D Rikl	6^{5}	6	7
(Switzerland) Y Allegro (Switzerland) R Federer	7^{7}	3	5
(Czech Republic) J Novák (Czech Republic) P Vízner	6	5	6
(Poland) M Fyrstenberg (Poland) M Matkowski	2	7	4
WC	(Germany) L Burgsmüller (Germany) A Popp	6	7^{7}
(France) A Clément (Russia) M Youzhny	0	6^{3}
(Germany) N Kiefer (Germany) R Schüttler	6	6^{5}	2
4	(Israel) J Erlich (Israel) A Ram	4	7^{7}	6
WC	(Germany) T Haas (Germany) A Waske	6^{3}	6^{4}
(Czech Republic) T Cibulec (Czech Republic) P Pála	7^{7}	7^{7}
(Austria) J Knowle (Germany) M Kohlmann	4	6^{2}
2	(Czech Republic) M Damm (Czech Republic) C Suk	6	7^{7}

Quarterfinals
(United States) M Fish (Romania) A Pavel	7^{8}	6^{1}	2
(Spain) F López (Armenia) S Sargsian	6^{6}	7^{7}	6
3	(India) L Paes (Czech Republic) D Rikl	7^{8}	6^{6}	7^{7}
(Czech Republic) J Novák (Czech Republic) P Vízner	6^{6}	7^{8}	6^{4}
WC	(Germany) L Burgsmüller (Germany) A Popp	4	7^{7}	4
4	(Israel) J Erlich (Israel) A Ram	6	6^{5}	6
(Czech Republic) T Cibulec (Czech Republic) P Pála	4	6	6
2	(Czech Republic) M Damm (Czech Republic) C Suk	6	2	3

Semifinals
(Spain) F López (Armenia) S Sargsian	2	6^{8}
3	(India) L Paes (Czech Republic) D Rikl	6	7^{10}
4	(Israel) J Erlich (Israel) A Ram	4	3
(Czech Republic) T Cibulec (Czech Republic) P Pála	6	6

Final
3	(India) L Paes (Czech Republic) D Rikl	6	7
(Czech Republic) T Cibulec (Czech Republic) P Pála	2	5
