= 2013 Gerry Weber Open – Doubles =

Doubles
- 2013 Gerry Weber Open

Final
- Champions: (Mexico) Santiago González (United States) Scott Lipsky
- Runners-up: (Italy) Daniele Bracciali (Israel) Jonathan Erlich
- Score: 6–2, 7–6^{(7–3)}

Details
- Draw: 16
- Seeds: 4

Events
Singles	Doubles
← 2012 ·	Gerry Weber Open	· 2014 →

Aisam-ul-Haq Qureshi and Jean-Julien Rojer were the defending champions, but lost in the first round to Kei Nishikori and Milos Raonic.
Santiago González and Scott Lipsky won the title, defeating Daniele Bracciali and Jonathan Erlich in the final, 6–2, 7–6^{(7–3)}.

== Seeds ==
1. (Pakistan) Aisam-ul-Haq Qureshi / (Netherlands) Jean-Julien Rojer (first round)
2. (Austria) Julian Knowle / (Romania) Horia Tecău (semifinals)
3. (Mexico) Santiago González / (United States) Scott Lipsky (champions)
4. (Philippines) Treat Conrad Huey / (United Kingdom) Dominic Inglot (quarterfinals)

== Draw ==
=== Key ===
- Q = Qualifier
- WC = Wild card
- LL = Lucky loser
- Alt = Alternate
- SE = Special exempt
- PR = Protected ranking
- ITF = ITF entry
- JE = Junior exempt
- w/o = Walkover
- r = Retired
- d = Defaulted
- SR = Special ranking

=== Draw ===
First round
1	(Pakistan) A-u-H Qureshi (Netherlands) J-J Rojer	7^{7}	6^{5}	[3]
(Japan) K Nishikori (Canada) M Raonic	6^{4}	7^{7}	[10]
WC	(Germany) R Kern (Germany) J-L Struff	4	2
(Germany) P Kohlschreiber (Russia) M Youzhny	6	6
4	(Philippines) TC Huey (United Kingdom) D Inglot	6^{4}	6	[10]
(Germany) F Mayer (Germany) S Stadler	7^{7}	4	[4]
(Italy) D Bracciali (Israel) J Erlich	6	6
(United States) J Cerretani (Latvia) E Gulbis	3	2
(Czech Republic) F Čermák (Slovakia) M Mertiňák	7	3	[8]
(Colombia) JS Cabal (Colombia) R Farah	6^{4}	6	[10]
WC	(Germany) D Brands (Germany) T Kamke	6^{3}	2
3	(Mexico) S González (United States) S Lipsky	7^{7}	6
(Switzerland) R Federer (Germany) T Haas	6^{3}	4
(Austria) J Melzer (Germany) P Petzschner	7^{7}	6
(Germany) A Begemann (Germany) M Emmrich	6^{3}	6^{10}
2	(Austria) J Knowle (Romania) H Tecău	7^{7}	7^{12}

Quarterfinals
(Japan) K Nishikori (Canada) M Raonic	2	5
(Germany) P Kohlschreiber (Russia) M Youzhny	6	7
4	(Philippines) TC Huey (United Kingdom) D Inglot	6	3	[4]
(Italy) D Bracciali (Israel) J Erlich	1	6	[10]
(Colombia) JS Cabal (Colombia) R Farah	3	4
3	(Mexico) S González (United States) S Lipsky	6	6
(Austria) J Melzer (Germany) P Petzschner
2	(Austria) J Knowle (Romania) H Tecău	w/o

Semifinals
(Germany) P Kohlschreiber (Russia) M Youzhny	6	1	[4]
(Italy) D Bracciali (Israel) J Erlich	4	6	[10]
3	(Mexico) S González (United States) S Lipsky	6	6
2	(Austria) J Knowle (Romania) H Tecău	4	4

Final
(Italy) D Bracciali (Israel) J Erlich	2	6^{3}
3	(Mexico) S González (United States) S Lipsky	6	7^{7}
