= 2003 Gerry Weber Open – Doubles =

Doubles
- 2003 Gerry Weber Open

Final
- Champions: (Sweden) Jonas Björkman (Australia) Todd Woodbridge
- Runners-up: (Czech Republic) Martin Damm (Czech Republic) Cyril Suk
- Score: 6–3, 6–4

Details
- Draw: 16
- Seeds: 4

Events
Singles	Doubles
← 2002 ·	Gerry Weber Open	· 2004 →

David Prinosil and David Rikl were the defending champions but only Prinosil competed that year with Yevgeny Kafelnikov.

Kafelnikov and Prinosil lost in the first round to Younes El Aynaoui and Ivan Ljubičić.

Jonas Björkman and Todd Woodbridge won in the final 6–3, 6–4 against Martin Damm and Cyril Suk.

== Seeds ==
Champion seeds are indicated in bold text while text in italics indicates the round in which those seeds were eliminated.

1. (Sweden) **Jonas Björkman** / (Australia) **Todd Woodbridge (champions)**
2. (Czech Republic) Martin Damm / (Czech Republic) Cyril Suk (final)
3. (United States) Donald Johnson / (India) Leander Paes (first round)
4. (Russia) Yevgeny Kafelnikov / (Germany) David Prinosil (first round)

== Draw ==
=== Key ===
- Q = Qualifier
- WC = Wild card
- LL = Lucky loser
- Alt = Alternate
- SE = Special exempt
- PR = Protected ranking
- ITF = ITF entry
- JE = Junior exempt
- w/o = Walkover
- r = Retired
- d = Defaulted
- SR = Special ranking

First round
1	(Sweden) **J Björkman** (Australia) **T Woodbridge**	**6**	**7^{7}**
WC	(Germany) H Dreekmann (Germany) N Kiefer	3	6^{1}
(Denmark) K Carlsen (Slovakia) K Kučera	3	2
(Switzerland) **Y Allegro** (Switzerland) **R Federer**	**6**	**6**
3	(United States) D Johnson (India) L Paes	2	6^{2}
(Czech Republic) **T Cibulec** (Czech Republic) **P Vízner**	**6**	**7^{7}**
WC	(Germany) **K Braasch** (Germany) **L Burgsmüller**	3	**6**	**6**
(Germany) R Schüttler (Russia) M Youzhny	**6**	2	3
ALT	(Australia) **T Perry** (United States) **B Vahaly**	6^{4}	**6**	**7**
ALT	(Austria) S Koubek (Armenia) S Sargsian	**7^{7}**	4	5
(Morocco) **Y El Aynaoui** (Croatia) **I Ljubičić**	**7^{7}**	**6**
4	(Russia) Y Kafelnikov (Germany) D Prinosil	6^{5}	3
(Russia) N Davydenko (South Korea) H-T Lee	4	1
(Czech Republic) **J Novák** (Czech Republic) **R Štěpánek**	**6**	**6**
(Czech Republic) P Pála (France) F Santoro	2	6^{1}
2	(Czech Republic) **M Damm** (Czech Republic) **C Suk**	**6**	**7^{7}**

Quarterfinals
1	(Sweden) **J Björkman** (Australia) **T Woodbridge**	**6**	**7^{9}**
(Switzerland) Y Allegro (Switzerland) R Federer	4	6^{7}
(Czech Republic) **T Cibulec** (Czech Republic) **P Vízner**	**6**	**7**
WC	(Germany) K Braasch (Germany) L Burgsmüller	1	5
ALT	(Australia) **T Perry** (United States) **B Vahaly**	**w/o**
(Morocco) Y El Aynaoui (Croatia) I Ljubičić
(Czech Republic) J Novák (Czech Republic) R Štěpánek	6^{4}	4
2	(Czech Republic) **M Damm** (Czech Republic) **C Suk**	**7^{7}**	**6**

Semifinals
1	(Sweden) **J Björkman** (Australia) **T Woodbridge**	**7**	**6**
(Czech Republic) T Cibulec (Czech Republic) P Vízner	5	1
ALT	(Australia) T Perry (United States) B Vahaly	**6**	4	3
2	(Czech Republic) **M Damm** (Czech Republic) **C Suk**	3	**6**	**6**

Final
1	(Sweden) **J Björkman** (Australia) **T Woodbridge**	**6**	**6**
2	(Czech Republic) M Damm (Czech Republic) C Suk	3	4
