= 2011 Gerry Weber Open – Doubles =

Doubles
- 2011 Gerry Weber Open

Final
- Champions: (India) Rohan Bopanna; (Pakistan) Aisam-ul-Haq Qureshi
- Runners-up: (Netherlands) Robin Haase; (Canada) Milos Raonic
- Score: 7–6^{(10–8)}, 3–6, [11–9]

Details
- Draw: 16
- Seeds: 4

Events
Singles	Doubles
← 2010 ·	Gerry Weber Open	· 2012 →

Sergiy Stakhovsky and Mikhail Youzhny were the defending champions, but chose not to compete due to Youzhny's injured left foot.
The first seeded Rohan Bopanna and Aisam-ul-Haq Qureshi defeated the unseeded pair Robin Haase and Milos Raonic with a score of 7–6^{(10–8)}, 3–6, [11–9].

== Seeds ==
1. (India) Rohan Bopanna / (Pakistan) Aisam-ul-Haq Qureshi (champions)
2. (United States) Eric Butorac / (Curaçao) Jean-Julien Rojer (quarterfinals)
3. (Czech Republic) Lukáš Dlouhý / (Slovakia) Michal Mertiňák (withdrew)
4. (Israel) Jonathan Erlich / (Israel) Andy Ram (first round)

== Draw ==
=== Key ===
- Q = Qualifier
- WC = Wild card
- LL = Lucky loser
- Alt = Alternate
- SE = Special exempt
- PR = Protected ranking
- ITF = ITF entry
- JE = Junior exempt
- w/o = Walkover
- r = Retired
- d = Defaulted
- SR = Special ranking

=== Draw ===
First round

Quarterfinals

Semifinals

Final

1
- (India) R Bopanna
- (Pakistan) A-u-H Qureshi
7
6

- (Croatia) I Dodig
- (Ukraine) A Dolgopolov
5
4

1
- (India) R Bopanna
- (Pakistan) A-u-H Qureshi
4
7^{7}
[10]

- (Germany) D Brown
- (France) G Monfils
6
6

- (Germany) D Brown
- (France) G Monfils
6
6^{5}
[4]

- (Spain) P Andújar
- (Spain) D Marrero
0
4

1
- (India) R Bopanna
- (Pakistan) A-u-H Qureshi
5
6
[11]

4
- (Israel) J Erlich
- (Israel) A Ram
3
3

- (Germany) C Kas
- (Germany) P Kohlschreiber
7
3
[9]

- (Germany) C Kas
- (Germany) P Kohlschreiber
6
6

- (Germany) C Kas
- (Germany) P Kohlschreiber
6
6

- (Finland) J Nieminen
- (Serbia) V Troicki
6
6

- (Finland) J Nieminen
- (Serbia) V Troicki
2
4

Alt
- (Switzerland) M Chiudinelli
- (Germany) L Uebel
4
2

1
- (India) R Bopanna
- (Pakistan) A-u-H Qureshi
7^{10}
3
[11]

- (Germany) F Mayer
- (Netherlands) R Wassen
7
3
[4]

- (Netherlands) R Haase
- (Canada) M Raonic
6^{8}
6
[9]

- (Netherlands) R Haase
- (Canada) M Raonic
5
6
[10]

- (Netherlands) R Haase
- (Canada) M Raonic
6
6

WC
- (Germany) D Meffert
- (Germany) M Zverev
7^{7}
6

WC
- (Germany) D Meffert
- (Germany) M Zverev
3
4

Alt
- (Argentina) L Mayer
- (Spain) P Riba
6^{0}
4

- (Netherlands) R Haase
- (Canada) M Raonic
6^{6}
7^{7}
[10]

- (Italy) D Bracciali
- (Czech Republic) F Čermák
6
6^{2}
[10]

WC
- (Australia) L Hewitt
- (Australia) P Luczak
7^{8}
6^{4}
[5]

WC
- (Australia) L Hewitt
- (Australia) P Luczak
4
7^{7}
[12]

WC
- (Australia) L Hewitt
- (Australia) P Luczak
3
7
[13]

- (Germany) M Kohlmann
- (Germany) P Petzschner
3
6
[11]

2
- (United States) E Butorac
- (Curaçao) J-J Rojer
6
5
[11]

2
- (United States) E Butorac
- (Curaçao) J-J Rojer
6
3
[13]
