= 2017 Gerry Weber Open – Doubles =

Doubles
- 2017 Gerry Weber Open

Final
- Champions: (Poland) Łukasz Kubot (Brazil) Marcelo Melo
- Runners-up: (Germany) Alexander Zverev (Germany) Mischa Zverev
- Score: 5–7, 6–3, [10–8]

Details
- Draw: 16
- Seeds: 4

Events
Singles	Doubles
← 2016 ·	Gerry Weber Open	· 2018 →

Raven Klaasen and Rajeev Ram were the two-time defending champions, but lost to Alexander and Mischa Zverev in the semifinals.

Łukasz Kubot and Marcelo Melo won the title, defeating the Zverev brothers in the final, 5–7, 6–3, [10–8].

== Seeds ==
1. (Poland) Łukasz Kubot / (Brazil) Marcelo Melo (champions)
2. (South Africa) Raven Klaasen / (United States) Rajeev Ram (semifinals)
3. (Netherlands) Jean-Julien Rojer / (Romania) Horia Tecău (quarterfinals)
4. (Romania) Florin Mergea / (Pakistan) Aisam-ul-Haq Qureshi (first round)

== Draw ==
=== Key ===
- Q = Qualifier
- WC = Wild card
- LL = Lucky loser
- Alt = Alternate
- SE = Special exempt
- PR = Protected ranking
- ITF = ITF entry
- JE = Junior exempt
- w/o = Walkover
- r = Retired
- d = Defaulted
- SR = Special ranking

=== Draw ===
First round
1	(Poland) Ł Kubot (Brazil) M Melo	6	4	[10]
(Japan) K Nishikori (Spain) F Verdasco	4	6	[8]
(Spain) R Bautista Agut (Spain) D Ferrer	7	1	[10]
(Mexico) S González (Croatia) M Pavić	5	6	[6]
3	(Netherlands) J-J Rojer (Romania) H Tecău	7^{7}	6
WC	(Germany) D Brown (Germany) J-L Struff	6^{3}	4
(France) F Martin (Spain) A Ramos Viñolas	7^{7}	6
(Germany) P Kohlschreiber (Austria) D Thiem	6^{3}	4
WC	(Germany) F Mayer (Germany) P Petzschner	4	1
(Germany) A Zverev (Germany) M Zverev	6	6
(United States) B Baker (Austria) A Peya	3	7^{7}	[10]
4	(Romania) F Mergea (Pakistan) A-u-H Qureshi	6	6^{3}	[8]
(France) R Gasquet (France) L Pouille	3	4
Q	(Germany) A Begemann (Germany) T Pütz	6	6
(France) G Monfils (France) G Simon	4	1
2	(South Africa) R Klaasen (United States) R Ram	6	6

Quarterfinals
1	(Poland) Ł Kubot (Brazil) M Melo	6	6
(Spain) R Bautista Agut (Spain) D Ferrer	1	4
3	(Netherlands) J-J Rojer (Romania) H Tecău	6^{7}	3
(France) F Martin (Spain) A Ramos Viñolas	7^{9}	6
(Germany) A Zverev (Germany) M Zverev	2
(United States) B Baker (Austria) A Peya	3^{r}
Q	(Germany) A Begemann (Germany) T Pütz	7^{9}	6^{5}	[5]
2	(South Africa) R Klaasen (United States) R Ram	6^{7}	7^{7}	[10]

Semifinals
1	(Poland) Ł Kubot (Brazil) M Melo	6^{2}	7^{8}	[10]
(France) F Martin (Spain) A Ramos Viñolas	7^{7}	6^{6}	[3]
(Germany) A Zverev (Germany) M Zverev	6	6
2	(South Africa) R Klaasen (United States) R Ram	3	3

Final
1	(Poland) Ł Kubot (Brazil) M Melo	5	6	[10]
(Germany) A Zverev (Germany) M Zverev	7	3	[8]

== Qualifying ==
=== Seeds ===
1. (Croatia) Nikola Mektić / (Chile) Julio Peralta (first round)
2. (Netherlands) Wesley Koolhof / (Netherlands) Matwé Middelkoop (first round)

=== Qualifiers ===
1. (Germany) Andre Begemann / (Germany) Tim Pütz

=== Qualifying draw ===
First round
1	(Croatia) Nikola Mektić (Chile) Julio Peralta	4	6	[6]
WC	(Germany) Andre Begemann (Germany) Tim Pütz	6	4	[10]
(Netherlands) Robin Haase (Australia) Bernard Tomic	7^{7}	7
2	(Netherlands) Wesley Koolhof (Netherlands) Matwé Middelkoop	6^{5}	5

Qualifying competition
WC	(Germany) Andre Begemann (Germany) Tim Pütz	6	4	[10]
(Netherlands) Robin Haase (Australia) Bernard Tomic	4	6	[8]
