= 2012 Gerry Weber Open – Singles =

Singles
- 2012 Gerry Weber Open

Final
- Champion: (Germany) Tommy Haas
- Runner-up: (Switzerland) Roger Federer
- Score: 7–6^{(7–5)}, 6–4

Details
- Draw: 28
- Seeds: 8

Events
| Singles | Doubles |
- Gerry Weber Open

Philipp Kohlschreiber was the defending champion but lost to Tommy Haas in the semifinals.

Haas went on to win the title after defeating five-time champion Roger Federer in the final 7–6^{(7–5)}, 6–4.

== Seeds ==
The top four seeds receive a bye into the second round.

1. (Spain) Rafael Nadal (quarterfinals)
2. (Switzerland) Roger Federer (final)
3. (Czech Republic) Tomáš Berdych (quarterfinals)
4. (Ukraine) Alexandr Dolgopolov (second round)
5. (Canada) Milos Raonic (quarterfinals)
6. (Spain) Marcel Granollers (second round)
7. (Italy) Andreas Seppi (first round)
8. (Germany) Philipp Kohlschreiber (semifinal)

== Draw ==
Key

- Q = Qualifier
- WC = Wild card
- LL = Lucky loser
- Alt = Alternate
- ITF = ITF entry
- PR = Protected ranking
- SR = Special ranking
- SE = Special exempt
- JE = Junior exempt
- JR = Junior Accelerator Programme entrant
- CO = College Accelerator Programme entrant
- NG = Next Gen Accelerator Program entrant
- w/o = Walkover
- r = Retired
- d = Defaulted

=== Finals ===
Semifinals
8 | (Germany) Philipp Kohlschreiber | 6^{5} | 5
WC | (Germany) Tommy Haas | 7^{7} | 7
(Russia) Mikhail Youzhny | 1 | 4
2 | (Switzerland) Roger Federer | 6 | 6

Final
WC | (Germany) Tommy Haas | 7^{7} | 6
2 | (Switzerland) Roger Federer | 6^{5} | 4

=== Top half ===
First round
(Slovakia) L Lacko | 2 | 6 | 6
Q | (Russia) K Kravchuk | 6 | 2 | 3
(Finland) J Nieminen | 4 | 4
(Poland) Ł Kubot | 6 | 6
WC | (Germany) D Brown | 6^{4} | 6^{4}
8 | (Germany) P Kohlschreiber | 7^{7} | 7^{7}
PR | (Germany) B Becker | 2 | 6^{6}
(Serbia) V Troicki | 6 | 7^{8}
WC | (Germany) T Haas | 5
(Australia) B Tomic | 2^{r}
Q | (Germany) M Zverev | 4 | 2
6 | (Spain) M Granollers | 6 | 6

Second round
1 | (Spain) R Nadal | 7 | 6
(Slovakia) L Lacko | 5 | 1
(Poland) Ł Kubot | 7^{7} | 1 | 3
8 | (Germany) P Kohlschreiber | 6^{5} | 6 | 6
3 | (Czech Republic) T Berdych | 6 | 6
(Serbia) V Troicki | 3 | 2
WC | (Germany) T Haas | 6 | 6
6 | (Spain) M Granollers | 3 | 4

Quarterfinals
1 | (Spain) R Nadal | 3 | 4
8 | (Germany) P Kohlschreiber | 6 | 6
3 | (Czech Republic) T Berdych | 4 | 6 | 5
WC | (Germany) T Haas | 6 | 3 | 7

Semifinals
8 | (Germany) P Kohlschreiber | 6^{5} | 5
WC | (Germany) T Haas | 7^{7} | 7

=== Bottom half ===
First round
7 | (Italy) A Seppi | 6^{6} | 6 | 6^{7}
(Czech Republic) R Štěpánek | 7^{8} | 4 | 7^{9}
(Germany) C-M Stebe | 6 | 3 | 7
(Argentina) C Berlocq | 3 | 6 | 5
(Russia) M Youzhny | 6 | 6
(Netherlands) R Haase | 3 | 2
5 | (Canada) M Raonic | 7 | 7^{7}
WC | (Germany) P Petzschner | 5 | 6^{1}
(Germany) T Kamke | 4 | 6^{2}
Q | (China) Z Zhang | 6 | 7^{7}
Q | (United States) T Smyczek | 4 | 4
(Germany) F Mayer | 6 | 6

Second round
(Czech Republic) R Štěpánek | 6 | 6
(Germany) C-M Stebe | 4 | 4
(Russia) M Youzhny | 6 | 3 | 6
4 | (Ukraine) A Dolgopolov | 4 | 6 | 3
5 | (Canada) M Raonic | 6 | 6
Q | (China) Z Zhang | 1 | 1
(Germany) F Mayer | 4 | 5
2 | (Switzerland) R Federer | 6 | 7

Quarterfinals
(Czech Republic) R Štěpánek | 4 | 6 | 4
(Russia) M Youzhny | 6 | 4 | 6
5 | (Canada) M Raonic | 7^{7} | 4 | 6^{3}
2 | (Switzerland) R Federer | 6^{4} | 6 | 7^{7}

Semifinals
(Russia) M Youzhny | 1 | 4
2 | (Switzerland) R Federer | 6 | 6

== Qualifying ==
=== Seeds ===
1. (Netherlands) Igor Sijsling (second round)
2. (Switzerland) Marco Chiudinelli (second round)
3. (Russia) Alexander Kudryavtsev (qualifying competition)
4. (Belgium) Maxime Authom (qualifying competition)
5. (Russia) Konstantin Kravchuk (qualified)
6. (Czech Republic) Jan Hernych (qualifying competition)
7. (United States) Tim Smyczek (qualified)
8. (China) Zhang Ze (qualified)

=== Qualifiers ===
1. (Germany) Mischa Zverev
2. (China) Zhang Ze
3. (Russia) Konstantin Kravchuk
4. (United States) Tim Smyczek

=== Draw ===
==== First qualifier ====
| First round | | | Second round | | | | | Qualifying competition |
| | | | 1 | (Netherlands) Igor Sijsling | 6 | 4 | 2 |
| (Germany) Mischa Zverev | 7^{10} | 7 | | (Germany) Mischa Zverev | 3 | 6 | 6 |
| (Moldova) Radu Albot | 6^{8} | 5 | | | | | | | (Germany) Mischa Zverev | 6 | 6 |
| (Canada) Érik Chvojka | 6 | 3 | | | | | | 6 | (Czech Republic) Jan Hernych | 3 | 4 |
| (Russia) Evgeny Kirillov | 3 | 0^{r} | | (Canada) Érik Chvojka | 6 | 4 | 2 |
| | | | 6 | (Czech Republic) Jan Hernych | 3 | 6 | 6 |

==== Second qualifier ====
| First round | | | | Second round | | | | | Qualifying competition |
| | | | | 2 | (Switzerland) Marco Chiudinelli | 2 | 7 | 4 |
| (Ukraine) Denys Molchanov | 7^{7} | 2 | 6 | | (Ukraine) Denys Molchanov | 6 | 5 | 6 |
| (Serbia) Ilija Bozoljac | 6^{4} | 6 | 4 | | | | | | | (Ukraine) Denys Molchanov | 6 | 1 | 4 |
| (Russia) Mikhail Ledovskikh | 7 | 7 | | | | | | | 8 | (China) Zhang Ze | 1 | 6 | 6 |
| (Germany) Andre Begemann | 5 | 5 | | | (Russia) Mikhail Ledovskikh | 4 | 1 |
| | | | | 8 | (China) Zhang Ze | 6 | 6 |

==== Third qualifier ====
| First round | | | Second round | | | | Qualifying competition |
| | | | 3 | (Russia) Alexander Kudryavtsev | 6 | 6 |
| (France) Albano Olivetti | 6 | 6 | | (France) Albano Olivetti | 4 | 2 |
| (Germany) Philipp Marx | 3 | 4 | | | | | 3 | (Russia) Alexander Kudryavtsev | 2^{r} |
| (Germany) Jaan-Frederik Brunken | 6 | 6 | | | | | 5 | (Russia) Konstantin Kravchuk | 5 |
| (Sweden) Johan Brunström | 4 | 4 | | (Germany) Jaan-Frederik Brunken | 2 | 4 |
| | | | 5 | (Russia) Konstantin Kravchuk | 6 | 6 |

==== Fourth qualifier ====
| First round | | | | Second round | | | | Qualifying competition |
| | | | | 4 | (Belgium) Maxime Authom | 6 | 6 |
| (Germany) Jan-Lennard Struff | 5 | 6 | 1 | | (United States) Alex Kuznetsov | 4 | 2 |
| (United States) Alex Kuznetsov | 7 | 4 | 6 | | | | | 4 | (Belgium) Maxime Authom | 6^{8} | 4 |
| (Brazil) André Ghem | 3 | 7 | 4 | | | | | 7 | (United States) Tim Smyczek | 7^{10} | 6 |
| (Australia) John Millman | 6 | 5 | 6 | | (Australia) John Millman | 3 | 5 |
| | | | | 7 | (United States) Tim Smyczek | 6 | 7 |
