= 2010 Gerry Weber Open – Singles =

Singles
- 2010 Gerry Weber Open

Final
- Champion: (Australia) Lleyton Hewitt
- Runner-up: (Switzerland) Roger Federer
- Score: 3–6, 7–6^{(7–4)}, 6–4

Details
- Draw: 32
- Seeds: 8

Events
Singles	Doubles
- Gerry Weber Open

Tommy Haas was the defending champion, but did not participate as he was recovering from hip surgery.
Lleyton Hewitt won 3–6, 7–6^{(7–4)}, 6–4 against five-time champion Roger Federer in the final to claim the title.

== Seeds ==
1. (Switzerland) Roger Federer (final)
2. (Russia) Nikolay Davydenko (second round)
3. (Russia) Mikhail Youzhny (first round)
4. (Spain) Juan Carlos Ferrero (first round)
5. (Czech Republic) Radek Štěpánek (withdrew due to an infection)
6. (Austria) Jürgen Melzer (second round)
7. (Cyprus) Marcos Baghdatis (first round)
8. (Australia) Lleyton Hewitt (champion)

== Draw ==
Key

- Q = Qualifier
- WC = Wild card
- LL = Lucky loser
- Alt = Alternate
- ITF = ITF entry
- PR = Protected ranking
- SR = Special ranking
- SE = Special exempt
- JE = Junior exempt
- JR = Junior Accelerator Programme entrant
- CO = College Accelerator Programme entrant
- NG = Next Gen Accelerator Program entrant
- w/o = Walkover
- r = Retired
- d = Defaulted

=== Finals ===
Semifinals
1	(Switzerland) Roger Federer	7^{7}	6
(Germany) Philipp Petzschner	6^{3}	4
8	(Australia) Lleyton Hewitt	6^{4}	7^{7}	6
(Germany) Benjamin Becker	7^{7}	6^{3}	2

Final
1	(Switzerland) Roger Federer	6	6^{4}	4
8	(Australia) Lleyton Hewitt	3	7^{7}	6

=== Top half ===
First round
1	(Switzerland) R Federer	6	6
(Finland) J Nieminen	4	4
Q	(Israel) N Okun	4	3
(Colombia) A Falla	6	6
(Switzerland) M Chiudinelli	6	2	6
(Belgium) O Rochus	3	6	3
(Germany) P Kohlschreiber	7^{7}	6^{10}	6
LL	(Belgium) R Bemelmans	6^{2}	7^{12}	4
4	(Spain) JC Ferrero	3	5
LL	(Germany) D Meffert	6	7
(Slovakia) L Lacko	7	7^{7}
(France) J Chardy	5	6^{0}
(Serbia) V Troicki	6	7^{7}
(Spain) G García-López	1	6^{4}
(Germany) P Petzschner	6	6
7	(Cyprus) M Baghdatis	4	3

Second round
1	(Switzerland) R Federer	6	6
(Colombia) A Falla	1	2
(Switzerland) M Chiudinelli	4	5
(Germany) P Kohlschreiber	6	7
LL	(Germany) D Meffert	6	4	3
(Slovakia) L Lacko	2	6	6
(Serbia) V Troicki	6^{5}	3
(Germany) P Petzschner	7^{7}	6

Quarterfinals
1	(Switzerland) R Federer	7	6
(Germany) P Kohlschreiber	5	3
(Slovakia) L Lacko	4	3
(Germany) P Petzschner	6	6

Semifinals
1	(Switzerland) R Federer	7^{7}	6
(Germany) P Petzschner	6^{4}	4

=== Bottom half ===
First round
8	(Australia) L Hewitt	6	6
(Australia) P Luczak	2	2
Q	(India) R Bopanna	4	6^{11}
(Netherlands) T de Bakker	6	7^{13}
WC	(Germany) A Beck	6	7
(Ukraine) S Stakhovsky	1	5
WC	(Germany) N Kiefer	4	6	7
3	(Russia) M Youzhny	6	1	5
6	(Austria) J Melzer	3	7^{7}	6
Q	(Russia) A Kudryavtsev	6	6^{2}	2
(France) F Serra	4	4
WC	(Germany) M Zverev	6	6
Q	(Russia) M Ledovskikh	4	2
(Germany) B Becker	6	6
(Germany) S Greul	6^{1}	0
2	(Russia) N Davydenko	7^{7}	6

Second round
8	(Australia) L Hewitt	6	6
(Netherlands) T de Bakker	3	3
WC	(Germany) A Beck	6	3	7^{7}
WC	(Germany) N Kiefer	2	6	6^{4}
6	(Austria) J Melzer	6	6^{2}	6^{3}
WC	(Germany) M Zverev	3	7^{7}	7^{7}
(Germany) B Becker	6	6
2	(Russia) N Davydenko	3	4

Quarterfinals
8	(Australia) L Hewitt	7^{7}	6
WC	(Germany) A Beck	6^{0}	1
WC	(Germany) M Zverev	6^{4}	0
(Germany) B Becker	7^{7}	6

Semifinals
8	(Australia) L Hewitt	6^{4}	7^{7}	6
(Germany) B Becker	7^{7}	6^{3}	2
