= 2010 Gerry Weber Open – Doubles =

Doubles
- 2010 Gerry Weber Open

Final
- Champions: (Ukraine) Sergiy Stakhovsky (Russia) Mikhail Youzhny
- Runners-up: (Czech Republic) Martin Damm (Slovakia) Filip Polášek
- Score: 4–6, 7–5, [10–7]

Details
- Draw: 16
- Seeds: 4

Events
Singles	Doubles
← 2009 ·	Gerry Weber Open	· 2011 →

Christopher Kas and Philipp Kohlschreiber were the defending champions, but they lost to František Čermák and Michal Mertiňák in the quarterfinals.
Sergiy Stakhovsky and Mikhail Youzhny won the final 4–6, 7–5, [10–7] against Martin Damm and Filip Polášek.

== Seeds ==
1. (Czech Republic) František Čermák / (Slovakia) Michal Mertiňák (semifinals)
2. (Czech Republic) Martin Damm / (Slovakia) Filip Polášek (final)
3. (Sweden) Johan Brunström / (Netherlands Antilles) Jean-Julien Rojer (semifinals)
4. (Germany) Michael Kohlmann / (Finland) Jarkko Nieminen (first round)

== Draw ==
=== Key ===
- Q = Qualifier
- WC = Wild card
- LL = Lucky loser
- Alt = Alternate
- SE = Special exempt
- PR = Protected ranking
- ITF = ITF entry
- JE = Junior exempt
- w/o = Walkover
- r = Retired
- d = Defaulted
- SR = Special ranking

=== Draw ===
First round
1	(Czech Republic) F Čermák (Slovakia) M Mertiňák	6	6
ALT	(Germany) A Beck (Germany) S Greul	1	3
WC	(Switzerland) Y Allegro (Switzerland) R Federer	4	6^{6}
(Germany) C Kas (Germany) P Kohlschreiber	6	7^{8}
4	(Germany) M Kohlmann (Finland) J Nieminen	6	6^{8}	[5]
(Ukraine) S Stakhovsky (Russia) M Youzhny	1	7^{10}	[10]
(Germany) P Marx (Slovakia) I Zelenay	6	7^{7}
(India) R Bopanna (Pakistan) A-u-H Qureshi	2	6^{3}
(Czech Republic) L Friedl (Serbia) D Vemić	7^{7}	6^{7}	[4]
(Switzerland) M Chiudinelli (Serbia) V Troicki	6^{5}	7^{9}	[10]
(Germany) B Becker (Germany) P Petzschner	7^{7}	6^{5}	[5]
3	(Sweden) J Brunström (Netherlands Antilles) J-J Rojer	6^{4}	7^{7}	[10]
(Australia) L Hewitt (Australia) P Luczak	7	6
WC	(Germany) N Kiefer (Germany) M Zverev	5	3
ALT	(France) J Chardy (France) F Serra	4	4
2	(Czech Republic) M Damm (Slovakia) F Polášek	6	6

Quarterfinals
1	(Czech Republic) F Čermák (Slovakia) M Mertiňák	6	6
(Germany) C Kas (Germany) P Kohlschreiber	2	4
(Ukraine) S Stakhovsky (Russia) M Youzhny	7^{7}	6
(Germany) P Marx (Slovakia) I Zelenay	6^{1}	3
(Switzerland) M Chiudinelli (Serbia) V Troicki	2	6	[8]
3	(Sweden) J Brunström (Netherlands Antilles) J-J Rojer	6	4	[10]
(Australia) L Hewitt (Australia) P Luczak	3	3
2	(Czech Republic) M Damm (Slovakia) F Polášek	6	6

Semifinals
1	(Czech Republic) F Čermák (Slovakia) M Mertiňák	6	3	[9]
(Ukraine) S Stakhovsky (Russia) M Youzhny	3	6	[11]
3	(Sweden) J Brunström (Netherlands Antilles) J-J Rojer	2	6	[9]
2	(Czech Republic) M Damm (Slovakia) F Polášek	6	3	[11]

Final
(Ukraine) S Stakhovsky (Russia) M Youzhny	4	7	[10]
2	(Czech Republic) M Damm (Slovakia) F Polášek	6	5	[7]
