= 2007 Gerry Weber Open – Singles =

Singles
- 2007 Gerry Weber Open

Final
- Champion: (Czech Republic) Tomáš Berdych
- Runner-up: (Cyprus) Marcos Baghdatis
- Score: 7–5, 6–4

Details
- Draw: 32
- Seeds: 8

Events
Singles	Doubles
- Gerry Weber Open

Roger Federer was the four-time defending champion, but withdrew due to fatigue.

Tomáš Berdych won in the final 7–5, 6–4, against Marcos Baghdatis.

== Seeds ==
1. (Switzerland) Roger Federer (withdrew due to fatigue)
2. (Russia) Nikolay Davydenko (second round)
3. (United States) James Blake (quarterfinals)
4. (Czech Republic) Tomáš Berdych (champion)
5. (France) Richard Gasquet (first round)
6. (Russia) Mikhail Youzhny (quarterfinals, withdrew)
7. (Argentina) David Nalbandian (first round)
8. (Cyprus) Marcos Baghdatis (final)

== Draw ==
Key

- Q = Qualifier
- WC = Wild card
- LL = Lucky loser
- Alt = Alternate
- ITF = ITF entry
- PR = Protected ranking
- SR = Special ranking
- SE = Special exempt
- JE = Junior exempt
- JR = Junior Accelerator Programme entrant
- CO = College Accelerator Programme entrant
- NG = Next Gen Accelerator Program entrant
- w/o = Walkover
- r = Retired
- d = Defaulted

=== Finals ===
Semifinals
(Finland) Jarkko Nieminen	6^{5}	4
4	(Czech Republic) Tomáš Berdych	7^{7}	6
(Germany) Philipp Kohlschreiber	6^{1}	4
8	(Cyprus) Marcos Baghdatis	7^{7}	6

Final
4	(Czech Republic) Tomáš Berdych	7	6
8	(Cyprus) Marcos Baghdatis	5	4

=== Top half ===
First round
LL	(Romania) A Pavel	6	7^{7}
(Belgium) O Rochus	3	6^{5}
(Finland) J Nieminen	6	6
(Belgium) K Vliegen	3	1
(Russia) T Gabashvili	4	6^{1}
(Germany) B Becker	6	7^{7}
(France) M Gicquel	5	6	6
7	(Argentina) D Nalbandian	7	2	4
4	(Czech Republic) T Berdych	6	7^{7}
WC	(Germany) N Kiefer	4	6^{3}
Q	(South Africa) W Moodie	3	6^{9}
(France) F Santoro	6	7^{11}
Q	(Germany) S Stadler	6	7^{7}
WC	(Germany) M Zverev	4	6^{5}
(United States) M Russell	2	2
6	(Russia) M Youzhny	6	6

Second round
LL	(Romania) A Pavel	6^{5}	6	1
(Finland) J Nieminen	7^{7}	3	6
(Germany) B Becker	2	6^{5}
(France) M Gicquel	6	7^{7}
4	(Czech Republic) T Berdych	6	7^{7}
(France) F Santoro	3	6^{5}
Q	(Germany) S Stadler	4	6	3
6	(Russia) M Youzhny	6	1	6

Quarterfinals
(Finland) J Nieminen	6
(France) M Gicquel	4	r
4	(Czech Republic) T Berdych	w/o
6	(Russia) M Youzhny

Semifinals
(Finland) J Nieminen	6^{5}	4
4	(Czech Republic) T Berdych	7^{7}	6

=== Bottom half ===
First round
5	(France) R Gasquet	6^{8}	4
Q	(Pakistan) A-u-H Qureshi	7^{10}	6
(Germany) P Kohlschreiber	7^{7}	7
Q	(Netherlands) R Sluiter	6^{5}	5
(Switzerland) S Wawrinka	6	3	4
(Russia) E Korolev	3	6	6
(United States) S Querrey	6	4	3
3	(United States) J Blake	4	6	6
8	(Cyprus) M Baghdatis	6	6
(France) G Simon	3	3
(Austria) S Koubek	7	3	5
(Sweden) R Söderling	5	6	7
WC	(Germany) M Kohlmann	6^{4}	5
(Germany) F Mayer	7^{7}	7
(Austria) J Melzer	6^{6}	6	2
2	(Russia) N Davydenko	7^{8}	4	6

Second round
Q	(Pakistan) A-u-H Qureshi	4	3
(Germany) P Kohlschreiber	6	6
(Russia) E Korolev	5	1
3	(United States) J Blake	7	6
8	(Cyprus) M Baghdatis	6^{9}	6	6
(Sweden) R Söderling	7^{11}	4	3
(Germany) F Mayer	6	6
2	(Russia) N Davydenko	4	4

Quarterfinals
(Germany) P Kohlschreiber	6	6
3	(United States) J Blake	4	3
8	(Cyprus) M Baghdatis	6	6
(Germany) F Mayer	3	3

Semifinals
(Germany) P Kohlschreiber	6^{1}	4
8	(Cyprus) M Baghdatis	7^{7}	6
