= 2019 Halle Open – Doubles =

Doubles
- 2019 Halle Open

Final
- Champions: (South Africa) Raven Klaasen (New Zealand) Michael Venus
- Runners-up: (Poland) Łukasz Kubot (Brazil) Marcelo Melo
- Score: 4–6, 6–3, [10–4]

Details
- Draw: 16
- Seeds: 4

Events
Singles	Doubles
- Halle Open

Łukasz Kubot and Marcelo Melo were the two-time defending champions, but lost in the final to Raven Klaasen and Michael Venus, 6–4, 3–6, [4–10].

== Seeds ==
1. (Poland) Łukasz Kubot / (Brazil) Marcelo Melo (final)
2. (South Africa) Raven Klaasen / (New Zealand) Michael Venus (champions)
3. (Croatia) Nikola Mektić / (Croatia) Franko Škugor (semifinals)
4. (Germany) Kevin Krawietz / (Germany) Andreas Mies (first round)

== Draw ==
Key

- Q = Qualifier
- WC = Wild card
- LL = Lucky loser
- Alt = Alternate
- ITF = ITF entry
- PR = Protected ranking
- SR = Special ranking
- SE = Special exempt
- JE = Junior exempt
- JR = Junior Accelerator Programme entrant
- CO = College Accelerator Programme entrant
- NG = Next Gen Accelerator Program entrant
- w/o = Walkover
- r = Retired
- d = Defaulted

=== Draw ===
First round
1	(Poland) Ł Kubot (Brazil) M Melo	6	6
(Netherlands) W Koolhof (Netherlands) M Middelkoop	3	2
(Argentina) G Pella (Portugal) J Sousa	1	3
(Belgium) D Goffin (France) P-H Herbert	6	6
4	(Germany) K Krawietz (Germany) A Mies	4	5
WC	(Germany) D Brown (Germany) T Pütz	6	7
LL	(Australia) M Ebden (United States) D Kudla	4	4
(Japan) B McLachlan (Germany) J-L Struff	6	6
(Italy) M Berrettini (Netherlands) J-J Rojer	6	6
(Moldova) R Albot (Russia) K Khachanov	3	4
(Netherlands) R Haase (Denmark) F Nielsen	3	3
3	(Croatia) N Mektić (Croatia) F Škugor	6	6
(Austria) O Marach (Austria) J Melzer	7	7^{7}
Q	(Brazil) M Demoliner (India) D Sharan	5	6^{5}
(United Kingdom) D Inglot (United States) A Krajicek	6^{4}	6^{6}
2	(South Africa) R Klaasen (New Zealand) M Venus	7^{7}	7^{8}

Quarterfinals
1	(Poland) Ł Kubot (Brazil) M Melo	6	6^{4}	[11]
(Belgium) D Goffin (France) P-H Herbert	4	7^{7}	[9]
WC	(Germany) D Brown (Germany) T Pütz	6^{6}	1
(Japan) B McLachlan (Germany) J-L Struff	7^{8}	6
(Italy) M Berrettini (Netherlands) J-J Rojer	4	6^{6}
3	(Croatia) N Mektić (Croatia) F Škugor	6	7^{8}
(Austria) O Marach (Austria) J Melzer	3	6^{9}
2	(South Africa) R Klaasen (New Zealand) M Venus	6	7^{11}

Semifinals
1	(Poland) Ł Kubot (Brazil) M Melo	6	6
(Japan) B McLachlan (Germany) J-L Struff	4	4
3	(Croatia) N Mektić (Croatia) F Škugor	6^{6}	4
2	(South Africa) R Klaasen (New Zealand) M Venus	7^{8}	6

Final
1	(Poland) Ł Kubot (Brazil) M Melo	6	3	[4]
2	(South Africa) R Klaasen (New Zealand) M Venus	4	6	[10]

== Qualifying ==
=== Seeds ===
1. (Brazil) Marcelo Demoliner / (India) Divij Sharan (qualified)
2. (Australia) Matthew Ebden / (United States) Denis Kudla (qualifying competition, lucky losers)

=== Qualifiers ===
1. (Brazil) Marcelo Demoliner / (India) Divij Sharan

=== Lucky losers ===
1. (Australia) Matthew Ebden / (United States) Denis Kudla

=== Qualifying draw ===
First round
1	(Brazil) Marcelo Demoliner (India) Divij Sharan	6	6^{1}	[10]
(Serbia) Laslo Đere (France) Benoît Paire	2	7^{7}	[8]
WC	(Germany) Matthias Bachinger (Germany) Peter Gojowczyk	6^{2}	0
2	(Australia) Matthew Ebden (United States) Denis Kudla	7^{7}	6

Qualifying competition
1	(Brazil) Marcelo Demoliner (India) Divij Sharan	6	6
2	(Australia) Matthew Ebden (United States) Denis Kudla	4	4
