= Halle Open =

Coordinates: 52°03′48″N 8°21′02″E

ATP Tour
- Tour: ATP Tour
- Founded: 1993; 33 years ago
- Editions: 33 (2026)
- Location: Halle (Westfalen), Germany
- Venue: Heristo Arena
- Category: ATP World Series / ATP International Series / ATP World Tour 250 series (1993–2014); ATP World Tour 500 series (2015–present)
- Surface: Grass (outdoor)
- Draw: 32S / 32Q / 16D
- Prize money: €2,195,175 (2023)
- Website: terrawortmann-open.de

Current champions (2026)
- Singles: (United States) Frances Tiafoe
- Doubles: (France) Théo Arribagé (France) Albano Olivetti

The Halle Open known as the Terra Wortmann Open (for sponsorship reasons) is an ATP Tour tennis tournament held in Halle, North Rhine-Westphalia, Germany. Held since 1993, the event is played on four outdoor grass courts and is a part of the ATP 500 series.

Between 1993 and 2018 it was sponsored by Gerry Weber. It was sponsored by Noventi from 2019 to 2021. In December 2021, a change of primary sponsor and name was announced. In 2022, the name of the ATP tournament was changed from the Noventi Open to the Terra Wortmann Open, as the company Wortmann AG secured the naming rights.

The Halle Open is held at the same time as the Queen's Club Championships, and the two are seen as the primary warm-up tournaments for the Wimbledon Championships, also on grass courts, which begins towards the end of June. The event was upgraded in 2015 from a 250 series to a 500 series tournament.

The Centre Court (the Heristo Arena) has 12,300 seats and a retractable roof which can be closed in 88 seconds so that tennis matches can continue with a closed roof when it begins to rain. The stadium is heated and also used for other sport events (handball, basketball, volleyball and boxing) and concerts.

== Past finals ==
In singles, Roger Federer (2003–06, 2008, 2013–15, 2017, 2019) holds the record for most overall titles (ten, out of thirteen finals), and most consecutive titles (four, in 2003–06). In doubles, Raven Klaasen (2015–16, 2019) and Marcelo Melo (2017–18, 2023) co-hold the record for most titles with three each, and co-hold the one for consecutive titles with Aisam-ul-Haq Qureshi (2011–12), Rajeev Ram (2015–16) and Łukasz Kubot (2017–18), at two. Federer also holds the record for overall titles for the combined events, with eleven.

=== Singles ===
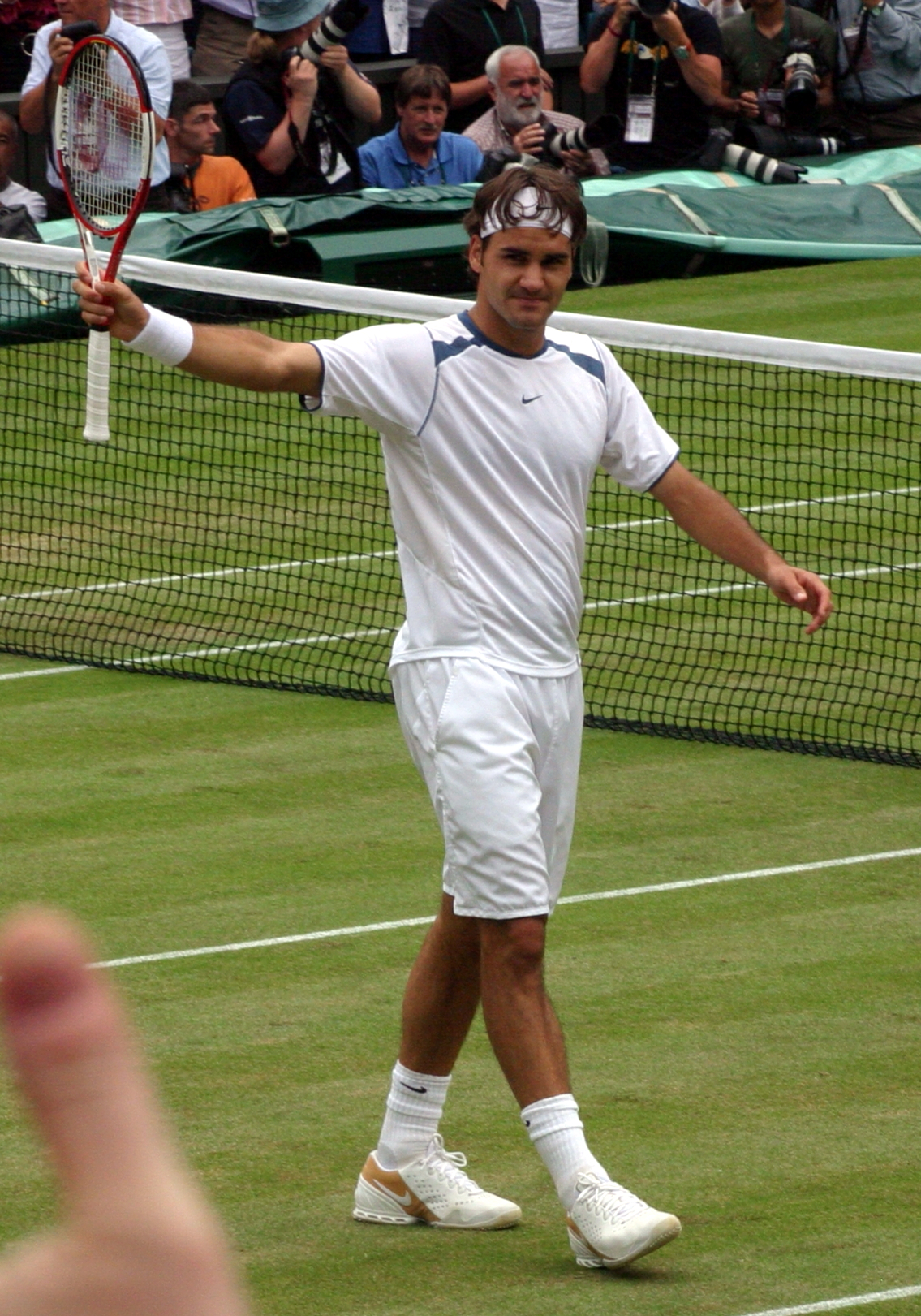
Roger Federer won ten singles titles in Halle (2003–06, 2008, 2013–15, 2017, 2019), three times without the loss of a set throughout the tournament (2004, 2008, 2017). He also won one doubles title at the event.

Year	Champion	Runner-up	Score
↓ ATP Tour 250 (Note: Known as World Series from 1990 till 1999. International Series from 2000 till 2008.) ↓
1993	(France) Henri Leconte	(Ukraine) Andrei Medvedev	6–2, 6–3
1994	(Germany) Michael Stich	(Sweden) Magnus Larsson	6–4, 4–6, 6–3
1995	(Switzerland) Marc Rosset	(Germany) Michael Stich	3–6, 7–6^{(13–11)}, 7–6^{(10–8)}
1996	(Sweden) Nicklas Kulti	(Russia) Yevgeny Kafelnikov	6–7^{(5–7)}, 6–3, 6–4
1997	(Russia) Yevgeny Kafelnikov	(Czech Republic) Petr Korda	7–6^{(7–2)}, 6–7^{(5–7)}, 7–6^{(9–7)}
1998	(Russia) Yevgeny Kafelnikov (2)	(Sweden) Magnus Larsson	6–4, 6–4
1999	(Germany) Nicolas Kiefer	(Sweden) Nicklas Kulti	6–3, 6–2
2000	(Germany) David Prinosil	(Netherlands) Richard Krajicek	6–3, 6–2
2001	(Sweden) Thomas Johansson	(France) Fabrice Santoro	6–3, 6–7^{(5–7)}, 6–2
2002	(Russia) Yevgeny Kafelnikov (3)	(Germany) Nicolas Kiefer	2–6, 6–4, 6–4
2003	(Switzerland) Roger Federer	(Germany) Nicolas Kiefer	6–1, 6–3
2004	(Switzerland) Roger Federer (2)	(United States) Mardy Fish	6–0, 6–3
2005	(Switzerland) Roger Federer (3)	(Russia) Marat Safin	6–4, 6–7^{(6–8)}, 6–4
2006	(Switzerland) Roger Federer (4)	(Czech Republic) Tomáš Berdych	6–0, 6–7^{(4–7)}, 6–2
2007	(Czech Republic) Tomáš Berdych	(Cyprus) Marcos Baghdatis	7–5, 6–4
2008	(Switzerland) Roger Federer (5)	(Germany) Philipp Kohlschreiber	6–3, 6–4
2009	(Germany) Tommy Haas	(Serbia) Novak Djokovic	6–3, 6–7^{(4–7)}, 6–1
2010	(Australia) Lleyton Hewitt	(Switzerland) Roger Federer	3–6, 7–6^{(7–4)}, 6–4
2011	(Germany) Philipp Kohlschreiber	(Germany) Philipp Petzschner	7–6^{(7–5)}, 2–0 retired
2012	(Germany) Tommy Haas (2)	(Switzerland) Roger Federer	7–6^{(7–5)}, 6–4
2013	(Switzerland) Roger Federer (6)	(Russia) Mikhail Youzhny	6–7^{(5–7)}, 6–3, 6–4
2014	(Switzerland) Roger Federer (7)	(Colombia) Alejandro Falla	7–6^{(7–2)}, 7–6^{(7–3)}
↓ ATP Tour 500 ↓
2015	(Switzerland) Roger Federer (8)	(Italy) Andreas Seppi	7–6^{(7–1)}, 6–4
2016	(Germany) Florian Mayer	(Germany) Alexander Zverev	6–2, 5–7, 6–3
2017	(Switzerland) Roger Federer (9)	(Germany) Alexander Zverev	6–1, 6–3
2018	(Croatia) Borna Ćorić	(Switzerland) Roger Federer	7–6^{(8–6)}, 3–6, 6–2
2019	(Switzerland) Roger Federer (10)	(Belgium) David Goffin	7–6^{(7–2)}, 6–1
2020	Not held due to the coronavirus pandemic		
2021	(France) Ugo Humbert	(Russia) Andrey Rublev	6–3, 7–6^{(7–4)}
2022	(Poland) Hubert Hurkacz	(Note: Competed under no nationality due to the Russian invasion of Ukraine.) Daniil Medvedev	6–1, 6–4
2023	(Kazakhstan) Alexander Bublik	Andrey Rublev	6–3, 3–6, 6–3
2024	(Italy) Jannik Sinner	(Poland) Hubert Hurkacz	7–6^{(10–8)}, 7–6^{(7–2)}
2025	(Kazakhstan) Alexander Bublik (2)	Daniil Medvedev	6–3, 7–6^{(7–4)}
2026	(United States) Frances Tiafoe	(United States) Taylor Fritz	6–4, 6–4

=== Doubles ===
Year	Champions	Runners-up	Score
↓ ATP Tour 250 ↓
1993	(Czech Republic) Petr Korda (Czech Republic) Cyril Suk	(United States) Mike Bauer (Germany) Marc-Kevin Goellner	7–6, 5–7, 6–3
1994	(France) Olivier Delaître (France) Guy Forget	(France) Henri Leconte (South Africa) Gary Muller	6–4, 6–7, 6–4
1995	(Netherlands) Jacco Eltingh (Netherlands) Paul Haarhuis	(Russia) Yevgeny Kafelnikov (Russia) Andrei Olhovskiy	6–2, 3–6, 6–3
1996	(Zimbabwe) Byron Black (Canada) Grant Connell	(Russia) Yevgeny Kafelnikov (Czech Republic) Daniel Vacek	6–1, 7–5
1997	(Germany) Karsten Braasch (Germany) Michael Stich	(South Africa) David Adams (South Africa) Marius Barnard	7–6, 6–3
1998	(South Africa) Ellis Ferreira (United States) Rick Leach	(South Africa) John-Laffnie de Jager (Germany) Marc-Kevin Goellner	4–6, 6–4, 7–6
1999	(Sweden) Jonas Björkman (Australia) Patrick Rafter	(Netherlands) Paul Haarhuis (United States) Jared Palmer	6–3, 7–5
2000	(Sweden) Nicklas Kulti (Sweden) Mikael Tillström	(India) Mahesh Bhupathi (Germany) David Prinosil	7–6^{(7–4)}, 7–6^{(7–4)}
2001	(Canada) Daniel Nestor (Australia) Sandon Stolle	(Belarus) Max Mirnyi (Australia) Patrick Rafter	6–4, 6–7^{(5–7)}, 6–1
2002	(Germany) David Prinosil (Czech Republic) David Rikl	(Sweden) Jonas Björkman (Australia) Todd Woodbridge	4–6, 7–6^{(7–5)}, 7–5
2003	(Sweden) Jonas Björkman (2) (Australia) Todd Woodbridge	(Czech Republic) Martin Damm (Czech Republic) Cyril Suk	6–3, 6–4
2004	(India) Leander Paes (Czech Republic) David Rikl (2)	(Czech Republic) Tomáš Cibulec (Czech Republic) Petr Pála	6–2, 7–5
2005	(Switzerland) Yves Allegro (Switzerland) Roger Federer	(Sweden) Joachim Johansson (Russia) Marat Safin	7–5, 6–7^{(6–8)}, 6–3
2006	(France) Fabrice Santoro (Serbia) Nenad Zimonjić	(Germany) Michael Kohlmann (Germany) Rainer Schüttler	6–0, 6–4
2007	(Sweden) Simon Aspelin (Austria) Julian Knowle	(France) Fabrice Santoro (Serbia) Nenad Zimonjić	6–4, 7–6^{(7–5)}
2008	(Russia) Mikhail Youzhny (Germany) Mischa Zverev	(Czech Republic) Lukáš Dlouhý (India) Leander Paes	3–6, 6–4, [10–3]*
2009	(Germany) Christopher Kas (Germany) Philipp Kohlschreiber	(Germany) Andreas Beck (Switzerland) Marco Chiudinelli	6–3, 6–4
2010	(Ukraine) Sergiy Stakhovsky (Russia) Mikhail Youzhny (2)	(Czech Republic) Martin Damm (Slovakia) Filip Polášek	4–6, 7–5, [10–7]
2011	(India) Rohan Bopanna (Pakistan) Aisam-ul-Haq Qureshi	(Netherlands) Robin Haase (Canada) Milos Raonic	7–6^{(10–8)}, 3–6, [11–9]
2012	(Pakistan) Aisam-ul-Haq Qureshi (2) (Netherlands) Jean-Julien Rojer	(Philippines) Treat Conrad Huey (United States) Scott Lipsky	6–3, 6–4
2013	(Mexico) Santiago González (United States) Scott Lipsky	(Italy) Daniele Bracciali (Israel) Jonathan Erlich	6–2, 7–6^{(7–3)}
2014	(Germany) Andre Begemann (Austria) Julian Knowle (2)	(Switzerland) Marco Chiudinelli (Switzerland) Roger Federer	1–6, 7–5, [12–10]
↓ ATP Tour 500 ↓
2015	(South Africa) Raven Klaasen (United States) Rajeev Ram	(India) Rohan Bopanna (Romania) Florin Mergea	7–6^{(7–5)}, 6–2
2016	(South Africa) Raven Klaasen (2) (United States) Rajeev Ram (2)	(Poland) Łukasz Kubot (Austria) Alexander Peya	7–6^{(7–5)}, 6–2
2017	(Poland) Łukasz Kubot (Brazil) Marcelo Melo	(Germany) Mischa Zverev (Germany) Alexander Zverev	5–7, 6–3, [10–8]
2018	(Poland) Łukasz Kubot (2) (Brazil) Marcelo Melo (2)	(Germany) Mischa Zverev (Germany) Alexander Zverev	7–6^{(7–1)}, 6–4
2019	(South Africa) Raven Klaasen (3) (New Zealand) Michael Venus	(Poland) Łukasz Kubot (Brazil) Marcelo Melo	4–6, 6–3, [10–4]
2020	Not held due to the coronavirus pandemic		
2021	(Germany) Kevin Krawietz (Romania) Horia Tecău	(Canada) Félix Auger-Aliassime (Poland) Hubert Hurkacz	7–6^{(7–4)}, 6–4
2022	(Argentina) Horacio Zeballos (Spain) Marcel Granollers	(Germany) Tim Pütz (New Zealand) Michael Venus	6-4, 6-7^{(5–7)}, [14-12]
2023	(Brazil) Marcelo Melo (3) (Australia) John Peers	(Italy) Simone Bolelli (Italy) Andrea Vavassori	7–6^{(7–3)}, 3–6, [10–6]
2024	(Italy) Simone Bolelli (Italy) Andrea Vavassori	(Germany) Kevin Krawietz (Germany) Tim Pütz	7–6^{(7–3)}, 7–6^{(7–5)}
2025	(Germany) Kevin Krawietz (Germany) Tim Pütz	(Italy) Simone Bolelli (Italy) Andrea Vavassori	6-3, 7–6^{(7–4)}
2026	(France) Théo Arribagé (France) Albano Olivetti	(Germany) Daniel Altmaier (Brazil) João Fonseca	7–6^{(7–2)}, 6–4

=== Statistics ===
==== Multiple championships ====
Player	Singles	Doubles	Total	Years
Roger Federer (SUI) +	10	1	11	2003 (S), 2004 (S), 2005 (S), 2005 (D), 2006 (S), 2008 (S), 2013 (S), 2014 (S), 2015 (S), 2017 (S), 2019 (S)
Yevgeny Kafelnikov (RUS)	3	0	3	1997 (S), 1998 (S), 2002 (S)
Marcelo Melo (BRA) +	0	3	3	2017 (D), 2018 (D), 2023 (D)
Raven Klaasen (RSA) +	0	3	3	2015 (D), 2016 (D), 2019 (D)
Tommy Haas (GER) +	2	0	2	2009 (S), 2012 (S)
Alexander Bublik (KAZ)	2	0	2	2023 (S), 2025 (S)
Nicklas Kulti (SWE)	1	1	2	1996 (S), 2000 (D)
David Prinosil (GER)	1	1	2	2000 (S), 2002 (D)
Philipp Kohlschreiber (GER) +	1	1	2	2009 (D), 2011 (S)
Jonas Björkman (SWE)	0	2	2	1999 (D), 2003 (D)
David Rikl (CZE)	0	2	2	2002 (D), 2004 (D)
Mikhail Youzhny (RUS) +	0	2	2	2008 (D), 2010 (D)
Aisam-ul-Haq Qureshi (PAK) +	0	2	2	2011 (D), 2012 (D)
Julian Knowle (AUT) +	0	2	2	2007 (D), 2014 (D)
Rajeev Ram (USA) +	0	2	2	2015 (D), 2016 (D)
Łukasz Kubot (POL) +	0	2	2	2017 (D), 2018 (D)
Kevin Krawietz (GER)	0	2	2	2021 (D), 2025 (D)

==== Championships by country ====
Country	Singles	First	Last	Doubles	First	Last	Overall
Germany (GER)	7	1994	2016	7	1997	2025	14
Switzerland (SUI)	11	1995	2019	1	2005	2005	12
Sweden (SWE)	2	1996	2001	4	1999	2007	6
Russia (RUS)	3	1997	2002	2	2008	2010	5
France (FRA)	2	1993	2021	3	1994	2026	5
Australia (AUS)	1	2010	2010	4	1999	2023	5
United States (USA)	1	2026	2026	4	1998	2016	5
Czech Republic (CZE)	1	2007	2007	3	1993	2004	4
South Africa (RSA)	0	—N/a	—N/a	4	1998	2019	4
Brazil (BRA)	0	—N/a	—N/a	3	2017	2023	3
Poland (POL)	1	2022	2022	2	2017	2018	3
Kazakhstan (KAZ)	2	2023	2025	0	—N/a	—N/a	2
Italy (ITA)	1	2024	2024	1	2024	2024	2
Canada (CAN)	0	—N/a	—N/a	2	1996	2001	2
India (IND)	0	—N/a	—N/a	2	2004	2011	2
Netherlands (NED)	0	—N/a	—N/a	2	1995	2012	2
Pakistan (PAK)	0	—N/a	—N/a	2	2011	2012	2
Austria (AUT)	0	—N/a	—N/a	2	2007	2014	2
Croatia (CRO)	1	2018	2018	0	—N/a	—N/a	1
New Zealand (NZL)	0	—N/a	—N/a	1	2019	2019	1
Zimbabwe (ZIM)	0	—N/a	—N/a	1	1996	1996	1
Serbia (SER)	0	—N/a	—N/a	1	2006	2006	1
Ukraine (UKR)	0	—N/a	—N/a	1	2010	2010	1
Mexico (MEX)	0	—N/a	—N/a	1	2013	2013	1
Romania (ROU)	0	—N/a	—N/a	1	2021	2021	1
