= 2013 BMW Open =

- Date: 29 April – 5 May
- Edition: 98th
- Category: ATP World Tour 250 series
- Draw: 28S / 16D
- Prize money: €467,800
- Surface: Clay
- Location: Munich, Germany
- Venue: MTTC Iphitos

Champions

Singles
- (Germany) Tommy Haas

Doubles
- (Finland) Jarkko Nieminen / (Russia) Dmitry Tursunov
← 2012 ·	BMW Open	· 2014 →

The 2013 BMW Open was a men's tennis tournament played on outdoor clay courts. It was the 98th edition of the event, and part of the ATP World Tour 250 series of the 2013 ATP World Tour. It took place at the MTTC Iphitos complex in Munich, Germany, from 29 April through 5 May 2013. Third-seeded Tommy Haas won the singles title.

== Singles main-draw entrants ==
=== Seeds ===
Country	Player	Rank^{1}	Seed
SRB	Janko Tipsarević	10	1
CRO	Marin Čilić	11	2
GER	Tommy Haas	14	3
GER	Philipp Kohlschreiber	21	4
UKR	Alexandr Dolgopolov	23	5
GER	Florian Mayer	29	6
RUS	Mikhail Youzhny	30	7
AUT	Jürgen Melzer	34	8

- Rankings are as of April 22, 2013.

=== Other entrants ===
The following players received wildcards into the main draw:

- (Germany) Tobias Kamke
- (Germany) Kevin Krawietz
- (France) Gaël Monfils

The following players received entry from the qualifying draw:

- (Germany) Matthias Bachinger
- (Kazakhstan) Evgeny Korolev
- (Poland) Łukasz Kubot
- (Australia) John Millman

The following player received entry as lucky loser:

- (Ukraine) Sergiy Stakhovsky

=== Withdrawals ===
Before the tournament

- (Brazil) Thomaz Bellucci
- (Belgium) Xavier Malisse
- (Australia) Bernard Tomic

== Doubles main-draw entrants ==
=== Seeds ===
Country	Player	Country	Player	Rank^{1}	Seed
AUT	Alexander Peya	BRA	Bruno Soares	38	1
AUT	Jürgen Melzer	IND	Leander Paes	43	2
AUT	Julian Knowle	SVK	Filip Polášek	57	3
CZE	František Čermák	SVK	Michal Mertiňák	86	4

- Rankings are as of April 22, 2013.

=== Other entrants ===
The following pairs received wildcards into the doubles main draw:

- (Germany) Matthias Bachinger / (Germany) Daniel Brands
- (Germany) Tommy Haas / (Czech Republic) Radek Štěpánek

== Finals ==
=== Singles ===
- (Germany) Tommy Haas defeated (Germany) Philipp Kohlschreiber, 6–3, 7–6^{(7–3)}

=== Doubles ===
- (Finland) Jarkko Nieminen / (Russia) Dmitry Tursunov defeated (Cyprus) Marcos Baghdatis / (United States) Eric Butorac, 6–1, 6–4
