= 2013 BMW Open – Singles =

Singles
- 2013 BMW Open

Final
- Champion: (Germany) Tommy Haas
- Runner-up: (Germany) Philipp Kohlschreiber
- Score: 6–3, 7–6^{(7–3)}

Details
- Draw: 28 (4 Q / 3 WC )
- Seeds: 8

Events
Singles	Doubles
← 2012 ·	BMW Open	· 2014 →

Philipp Kohlschreiber was the defending champion but lost in the final to Tommy Haas, 3–6, 6–7^{(3–7)}.

== Seeds ==
The top four seeds receive a bye into the second round.

1. (Serbia) Janko Tipsarević (quarterfinals)
2. (Croatia) Marin Čilić (second round)
3. (Germany) Tommy Haas (champion)
4. (Germany) Philipp Kohlschreiber (final)
5. (Ukraine) Alexandr Dolgopolov (quarterfinals)
6. (Germany) Florian Mayer (quarterfinals)
7. (Russia) Mikhail Youzhny (first round)
8. (Austria) Jürgen Melzer (first round)

== Draw ==
=== Key ===
- Q = Qualifier
- WC = Wild card
- LL = Lucky loser
- Alt = Alternate
- SE = Special exempt
- PR = Protected ranking
- ITF = ITF entry
- JE = Junior exempt
- w/o = Walkover
- r = Retired
- d = Defaulted
- SR = Special ranking

=== Finals ===
Semifinals
(Germany) Daniel Brands	7^{7}	3	6^{5}
4	(Germany) Philipp Kohlschreiber	6^{4}	6	7^{7}
3	(Germany) Tommy Haas	6	6
(Croatia) Ivan Dodig	4	3

Final
4	(Germany) Philipp Kohlschreiber	3	6^{3}
3	(Germany) Tommy Haas	6	7^{7}

=== Top half ===
First round
Q	(Australia) J Millman	2	2
(Slovenia) G Žemlja	6	6
(Germany) D Brands	5	6	6
WC	(Germany) T Kamke	7	4	3
WC	(France) G Monfils	6	6
8	(Austria) J Melzer	3	3
(Cyprus) M Baghdatis	5	6^{3}
Q	(Kazakhstan) E Korolev	7	7^{7}
Q	(Germany) M Bachinger	3	2
(Serbia) V Troicki	6	6
(Czech Republic) R Štěpánek	6	5	6
7	(Russia) M Youzhny	4	7	4

Second round
1	(Serbia) J Tipsarević	6	6
(Slovenia) G Žemlja	4	2
(Germany) D Brands	6	3	6
WC	(France) G Monfils	3	6	0
4	(Germany) P Kohlschreiber	6	6
Q	(Kazakhstan) E Korolev	2	4
(Serbia) V Troicki	6	6
(Czech Republic) R Štěpánek	4	4

Quarterfinals
1	(Serbia) J Tipsarević	3	6	4
(Germany) D Brands	6	4	6
4	(Germany) P Kohlschreiber	6	7^{7}
(Serbia) V Troicki	3	6^{3}

Semifinals
(Germany) D Brands	7^{7}	3	6^{5}
4	(Germany) P Kohlschreiber	6^{4}	6	7^{7}

=== Bottom half ===
First round
6	(Germany) F Mayer	7^{7}	4	7
Q	(Poland) Ł Kubot	6^{2}	6	5
(Australia) M Matosevic	6	6
WC	(Germany) K Krawietz	2	4
(Latvia) E Gulbis	6	6
(Finland) J Nieminen	4	2
5	(Ukraine) A Dolgopolov	6	6
LL	(Ukraine) S Stakhovsky	4	2
(France) P-H Mathieu	3	4
(Russia) D Tursunov	6	6
(Russia) N Davydenko	4	4
(Croatia) I Dodig	6	6

Second round
6	(Germany) F Mayer	2	6	6
(Australia) M Matosevic	6	4	2
(Latvia) E Gulbis	4	7^{7}	1
3	(Germany) T Haas	6	6^{3}	6
5	(Ukraine) A Dolgopolov	7^{7}	7^{7}
(Russia) D Tursunov	6^{2}	6^{3}
(Croatia) I Dodig	6	6
2	(Croatia) M Čilić	4	2

Quarterfinals
6	(Germany) F Mayer	4	1
3	(Germany) T Haas	6	6
5	(Ukraine) A Dolgopolov	4	4
(Croatia) I Dodig	6	6

Semifinals
3	(Germany) T Haas	6	6
(Croatia) I Dodig	4	3

== Qualifying ==
=== Seeds ===
1. (Colombia) Santiago Giraldo (second round)
2. (Poland) Łukasz Kubot (qualified)
3. (Ukraine) Sergiy Stakhovsky (Qualifying competition, lucky loser)
4. (Germany) Matthias Bachinger (qualified)
5. (Germany) Jan-Lennard Struff (qualifying competition)
6. (Ukraine) Illya Marchenko (first round)
7. (Australia) John Millman (qualified)
8. (Germany) Simon Greul (first round)

=== Qualifiers ===
1. (Kazakhstan) Evgeny Korolev
2. (Poland) Łukasz Kubot
3. (Australia) John Millman
4. (Germany) Matthias Bachinger

=== Lucky losers ===
1. (Ukraine) Sergiy Stakhovsky

=== Draw ===
==== First qualifier ====
First round
1	(Colombia) Santiago Giraldo	6	6
(Slovakia) Ivo Klec	1	2
(Germany) Jeremy Jahn	0	3
(Kazakhstan) Evgeny Korolev	6	6
(Germany) Michael Berrer	7^{7}	6
(United Kingdom) Alexander Ward	6^{4}	3
(Germany) Peter Gojowczyk	6^{1}	4
5	(Germany) Jan-Lennard Struff	7^{7}	6

Second round
1	(Colombia) Santiago Giraldo	3	6	4
(Kazakhstan) Evgeny Korolev	6	4	6
(Germany) Michael Berrer	4	3
5	(Germany) Jan-Lennard Struff	6	6

Qualifying competition
(Kazakhstan) Evgeny Korolev	4	7^{11}	6
5	(Germany) Jan-Lennard Struff	6	6^{9}	1

==== Second qualifier ====
First round
2	(Poland) Łukasz Kubot	6	6
WC	(Germany) David Thurner	2	3
(Serbia) Filip Krajinović	6	6
(Hungary) Attila Balázs	2	2
WC	(Germany) Stephan Hoiss	6	6
WC	(Germany) Kevin Kaczynski	4	3
(Chile) Hans Podlipnik Castillo	6	7^{7}
6	(Ukraine) Illya Marchenko	4	6^{4}

Second round
2	(Poland) Łukasz Kubot	6	6
(Serbia) Filip Krajinović	2	3
WC	(Germany) Stephan Hoiss	2	7	6
(Chile) Hans Podlipnik Castillo	6	5	3

Qualifying competition
2	(Poland) Łukasz Kubot	6	6
WC	(Germany) Stephan Hoiss	2	2

==== Third qualifier ====
First round
3	(Ukraine) Sergiy Stakhovsky	7^{7}	6
(Australia) Matthew Barton	6^{5}	2
(Germany) Robin Kern	7^{7}	2	6
(Germany) Maximilian Dinslaken	6^{4}	6	1
(Germany) Nils Langer	6	6
(Germany) Steven Moneke	4	4
(Germany) Björn Phau	6	3	6^{3}
7	(Australia) John Millman	2	6	7^{7}

Second round
3	(Ukraine) Sergiy Stakhovsky	6	7^{7}
(Germany) Robin Kern	3	6^{2}
(Germany) Nils Langer	1	3
7	(Australia) John Millman	6	6

Qualifying competition
3	(Ukraine) Sergiy Stakhovsky	6	6^{3}	1
7	(Australia) John Millman	3	7^{7}	6

==== Fourth qualifier ====
First round
4	(Germany) Matthias Bachinger	6	4	5
(Germany) Marc Sieber	3	6	2^{r}
(Germany) Moritz Baumann	6	6
WC	(Germany) Tobias Simon	2	4
(Germany) Andreas Beck	6	6
(Germany) Peter Heller	4	4
(Austria) Martin Fischer	6	3	6
8	(Germany) Simon Greul	1	6	4

Second round
4	(Germany) Matthias Bachinger	6	6
(Germany) Moritz Baumann	3	3
(Germany) Andreas Beck	2	6	6
(Austria) Martin Fischer	6	4	4

Qualifying competition
4	(Germany) Matthias Bachinger	6	3	6
(Germany) Andreas Beck	4	6	4
