= 2017 MercedesCup – Doubles =

Doubles
- 2017 MercedesCup

Final
- Champion: (United Kingdom) Jamie Murray (Brazil) Bruno Soares
- Runner-up: (Austria) Oliver Marach (Croatia) Mate Pavić
- Score: 6–7^{(4–7)}, 7–5, [10–5]

Details
- Draw: 16
- Seeds: 4

Events
Singles	Doubles
- Stuttgart Open

Marcus Daniell and Artem Sitak were the defending champions, but chose not to participate together. Daniell played alongside Marcelo Demoliner, but lost in the quarterfinals to Bob and Mike Bryan. Sitak teamed up with Nicholas Monroe, but lost in the quarterfinals to Oliver Marach and Mate Pavić.

Jamie Murray and Bruno Soares won the title, defeating Marach and Pavić in the final, 6–7^{(4–7)}, 7–5, [10–5].

== Seeds ==
1. (United States) Bob Bryan / (United States) Mike Bryan (semifinals)
2. (United Kingdom) Jamie Murray / (Brazil) Bruno Soares (champions)
3. (Romania) Florin Mergea / (Pakistan) Aisam-ul-Haq Qureshi (first round)
4. (Austria) Oliver Marach / (Croatia) Mate Pavić (final)

== Draw ==
Key

- Q = Qualifier
- WC = Wild card
- LL = Lucky loser
- Alt = Alternate
- ITF = ITF entry
- PR = Protected ranking
- SR = Special ranking
- SE = Special exempt
- JE = Junior exempt
- JR = Junior Accelerator Programme entrant
- CO = College Accelerator Programme entrant
- NG = Next Gen Accelerator Program entrant
- w/o = Walkover
- r = Retired
- d = Defaulted

=== Draw ===
First round
1	(United States) B Bryan (United States) M Bryan	7^{7}	6
(Australia) B Tomic (Germany) M Zverev	6^{2}	4
(Serbia) V Troicki (Serbia) N Zimonjić	1	6	[7]
(New Zealand) M Daniell (Brazil) M Demoliner	6	3	[10]
4	(Austria) O Marach (Croatia) M Pavić	7^{7}	6^{7}	[10]
WC	(Germany) A Begemann (Germany) J-L Struff	6^{3}	7^{9}	[6]
(United States) S Johnson (Spain) F López	5	6^{4}
(United States) N Monroe (New Zealand) A Sitak	7	7^{7}
(Spain) D Marrero (France) B Paire	6	3	[4]
(Poland) M Matkowski (Belarus) M Mirnyi	4	6	[10]
WC	(Germany) T Haas (Germany) F Mayer	7^{7}	2	[10]
3	(Romania) F Mergea (Pakistan) A-u-H Qureshi	6^{5}	6	[7]
(France) L Pouille (France) G Simon	5	3
(United States) B Baker (Croatia) N Mektić	7	6
(Philippines) T Huey (Sweden) R Lindstedt
2	(United Kingdom) J Murray (Brazil) B Soares	w/o

Quarterfinals
1	(United States) B Bryan (United States) M Bryan	6^{5}	6	[10]
(New Zealand) M Daniell (Brazil) M Demoliner	7^{7}	3	[6]
4	(Austria) O Marach (Croatia) M Pavić	6	7^{7}
(United States) N Monroe (New Zealand) A Sitak	4	6^{4}
(Poland) M Matkowski (Belarus) M Mirnyi	w/o
WC	(Germany) T Haas (Germany) F Mayer
(United States) B Baker (Croatia) N Mektić	4	7^{10}	[8]
2	(United Kingdom) J Murray (Brazil) B Soares	6	6^{8}	[10]

Semifinals
1	(United States) B Bryan (United States) M Bryan	6^{3}	3
4	(Austria) O Marach (Croatia) M Pavić	7^{7}	6
(Poland) M Matkowski (Belarus) M Mirnyi	3	7^{7}	[6]
2	(United Kingdom) J Murray (Brazil) B Soares	6	6^{5}	[10]

Final
4	(Austria) O Marach (Croatia) M Pavić	7^{7}	5	[5]
2	(United Kingdom) J Murray (Brazil) B Soares	6^{4}	7	[10]
