= 2013 BMW Open – Doubles =

Doubles
- 2013 BMW Open

Final
- Champions: (Finland) Jarkko Nieminen (Russia) Dmitry Tursunov
- Runners-up: (Cyprus) Marcos Baghdatis (United States) Eric Butorac
- Score: 6–1, 6–4

Events
Singles	Doubles
← 2012 ·	BMW Open	· 2014 →

František Čermák and Filip Polášek were the defending champions, but decided not to participate together.
Čermak played alongside Michal Mertiňák, but lost in the first round to Marcos Baghdatis and Eric Butorac, while Polášek teamed up with Julian Knowle and lost in the semifinals to Jarkko Nieminen and Dmitry Tursunov.
Nieminen and Tursunov went on to win the title, defeating Baghdatis and Butorac in the final, 6–1, 6–4.

== Seeds ==
1. (Austria) Alexander Peya / (Brazil) Bruno Soares (quarterfinals)
2. (Austria) Jürgen Melzer / (India) Leander Paes (quarterfinals)
3. (Austria) Julian Knowle / (Slovakia) Filip Polášek (semifinals)
4. (Czech Republic) František Čermák / (Slovakia) Michal Mertiňák (first round)

== Draw ==
=== Key ===
- Q = Qualifier
- WC = Wild card
- LL = Lucky loser
- Alt = Alternate
- SE = Special exempt
- PR = Protected ranking
- ITF = ITF entry
- JE = Junior exempt
- w/o = Walkover
- r = Retired
- d = Defaulted
- SR = Special ranking

=== Draw ===
First round
1	(Austria) A Peya (Brazil) B Soares	6	6
(Sweden) J Brunström (Germany) F Moser	4	2
(United States) N Monroe (Germany) S Stadler	4	4
(Finland) J Nieminen (Russia) D Tursunov	6	6
3	(Austria) J Knowle (Slovakia) F Polášek	7^{8}	7^{9}
WC	(Germany) M Bachinger (Germany) D Brands	6^{6}	6^{7}
(Germany) A Begemann (Germany) M Emmrich	6	3	[10]
WC	(Germany) T Haas (Czech Republic) R Štěpánek	4	6	[7]
(Croatia) I Dodig (Australia) M Matosevic	4	6	[6]
(Czech Republic) L Dlouhý (Serbia) V Troicki	6	4	[10]
(Cyprus) M Baghdatis (United States) E Butorac	6	6
4	(Czech Republic) F Čermák (Slovakia) M Mertiňák	3	4
(Colombia) JS Cabal (Colombia) R Farah	6	6
(Colombia) S Giraldo (Poland) Ł Kubot	4	2
(Germany) C Kas (Austria) O Marach	2	6	[6]
2	(Austria) J Melzer (India) L Paes	6	1	[10]

Quarterfinals
1	(Austria) A Peya (Brazil) B Soares	4	1
(Finland) J Nieminen (Russia) D Tursunov	6	6
3	(Austria) J Knowle (Slovakia) F Polášek	5	6	[10]
(Germany) A Begemann (Germany) M Emmrich	7	4	[6]
(Czech Republic) L Dlouhý (Serbia) V Troicki	6	3	[10]
(Cyprus) M Baghdatis (United States) E Butorac	4	6	[12]
(Colombia) JS Cabal (Colombia) R Farah	6	6
2	(Austria) J Melzer (India) L Paes	3	3

Semifinals
(Finland) J Nieminen (Russia) D Tursunov	6	6
3	(Austria) J Knowle (Slovakia) F Polášek	1	4
(Cyprus) M Baghdatis (United States) E Butorac	7^{7}	1	[10]
(Colombia) JS Cabal (Colombia) R Farah	6^{3}	6	[7]

Final
(Finland) J Nieminen (Russia) D Tursunov	6	6
(Cyprus) M Baghdatis (United States) E Butorac	1	4
