= 2012 BMW Open – Doubles =

Doubles
- 2012 BMW Open

Final
- Champions: (Czech Republic) František Čermák (Slovakia) Filip Polášek
- Runners-up: (Belgium) Xavier Malisse (Belgium) Dick Norman
- Score: 6–4, 7–5

Events
Singles	Doubles
← 2011 ·	BMW Open	· 2013 →

Simone Bolelli and Horacio Zeballos were the defending champions but decided not to participate. Bolelli entered the Estoril Open instead, while Zeballos competes in the Tunis Open.
František Čermák and Filip Polášek won the tournament defeating Xavier Malisse and Dick Norman 6–4, 7–5 in the final.

== Seeds ==
1. (Czech Republic) František Čermák / (Slovakia) Filip Polášek (champions)
2. (Austria) Oliver Marach / (Austria) Alexander Peya (first round)
3. (Mexico) Santiago González / (Germany) Christopher Kas (first round)
4. (Colombia) Juan Sebastián Cabal / (Colombia) Robert Farah (semifinals)

== Draw ==
=== Key ===
- Q = Qualifier
- WC = Wild card
- LL = Lucky loser
- Alt = Alternate
- SE = Special exempt
- PR = Protected ranking
- ITF = ITF entry
- JE = Junior exempt
- w/o = Walkover
- r = Retired
- d = Defaulted
- SR = Special ranking

=== Draw ===
First round
1	(Czech Republic) F Čermák (Slovakia) F Polášek	6	3	[10]
(Kazakhstan) M Kukushkin (Ukraine) S Stakhovsky	2	6	[4]
(Australia) M Matosevic (Australia) B Tomic	4	4
(Croatia) M Čilić (Croatia) L Zovko	6	6
4	(Colombia) JS Cabal (Colombia) R Farah	5	6	[10]
WC	(Germany) D Brands (Germany) K Krawietz	7	2	[7]
(Germany) M Bachinger (Germany) F Moser	7^{7}	1	[10]
WC	(Germany) T Haas (Germany) P Petzschner	6^{5}	6	[4]
(Cyprus) M Baghdatis (Russia) M Youzhny	7^{9}	2	[9]
(Germany) M Kohlmann (United Kingdom) J Murray	6^{7}	6	[11]
(Belgium) X Malisse (Belgium) D Norman	6	7^{7}
3	(Mexico) S González (Germany) C Kas	3	6^{5}
(Colombia) A Falla (Colombia) S Giraldo	6	7^{7}
(Slovakia) M Mertiňák (Brazil) A Sá	4	6^{3}
(Germany) D Brown (Germany) A Waske	7	6
2	(Austria) O Marach (Austria) A Peya	5	1

Quarterfinals
1	(Czech Republic) F Čermák (Slovakia) F Polášek	6	6
(Croatia) M Čilić (Croatia) L Zovko	1	4
4	(Colombia) JS Cabal (Colombia) R Farah	6	7
(Germany) M Bachinger (Germany) F Moser	4	5
(Germany) M Kohlmann (United Kingdom) J Murray	6^{2}	3
(Belgium) X Malisse (Belgium) D Norman	7^{7}	6
(Colombia) A Falla (Colombia) S Giraldo	2	1
(Germany) D Brown (Germany) A Waske	6	6

Semifinals
1	(Czech Republic) F Čermák (Slovakia) F Polášek	1	7^{7}	[10]
4	(Colombia) JS Cabal (Colombia) R Farah	6	6^{5}	[8]
(Belgium) X Malisse (Belgium) D Norman	6	3	[10]
(Germany) D Brown (Germany) A Waske	4	6	[7]

Final
1	(Czech Republic) F Čermák (Slovakia) F Polášek	6	7
(Belgium) X Malisse (Belgium) D Norman	4	5
