= 2014 BMW Open – Doubles =

Doubles
- 2014 BMW Open

Final
- Champions: (United Kingdom) Jamie Murray (Australia) John Peers
- Runners-up: (United Kingdom) Colin Fleming (United Kingdom) Ross Hutchins
- Score: 6–4, 6–2

Events
Singles	Doubles
← 2013 ·	BMW Open	· 2015 →

Jarkko Nieminen and Dmitry Tursunov were the defending champions, but Tursunov chose to play in Oeiras instead. Nieminen partnered up with Rameez Junaid but lost in the quarterfinals to Eric Butorac and Raven Klaasen.

Jamie Murray and John Peers won the title, defeating Colin Fleming and Ross Hutchins in the final, 6–4, 6–2.

== Seeds ==
1. (United States) Eric Butorac / (South Africa) Raven Klaasen (semifinals)
2. (Colombia) Juan Sebastián Cabal / (Colombia) Robert Farah (quarterfinals)
3. (United Kingdom) Jamie Murray / (Australia) John Peers (champions)
4. (Poland) Tomasz Bednarek / (Croatia) Marin Draganja (first round)

== Draw ==
=== Key ===
- Q = Qualifier
- WC = Wild card
- LL = Lucky loser
- Alt = Alternate
- SE = Special exempt
- PR = Protected ranking
- ITF = ITF entry
- JE = Junior exempt
- w/o = Walkover
- r = Retired
- d = Defaulted
- SR = Special ranking

=== Draw ===
First round
1	(United States) E Butorac (South Africa) R Klaasen	6	6^{2}	[11]
(Sweden) J Brunström (Finland) H Kontinen	4	7^{7}	[9]
(Australia) R Junaid (Finland) J Nieminen	6	6
WC	(Germany) M Bachinger (Germany) K Krawietz	2	4
3	(United Kingdom) J Murray (Australia) J Peers	6	6
WC	(Germany) A Satschko (Germany) J-L Struff	4	3
(Argentina) F Delbonis (Colombia) A Falla	3	4
(Czech Republic) L Dlouhý (Croatia) M Pavić	6	6
(Germany) D Brown (Austria) J Knowle	6^{3}	6	[10]
(Austria) O Marach (Austria) J Melzer	7^{7}	4	[3]
(Australia) L Hewitt (Australia) M Matosevic	6	7
4	(Poland) T Bednarek (Croatia) M Draganja	4	5
(Italy) D Bracciali (Italy) A Seppi	3	5
PR	(United Kingdom) C Fleming (United Kingdom) R Hutchins	6	7
(Germany) M Emmrich (Germany) C Kas	3	3
2	(Colombia) JS Cabal (Colombia) R Farah	6	6

Quarterfinals
1	(United States) E Butorac (South Africa) R Klaasen	6	6
(Australia) R Junaid (Finland) J Nieminen	3	4
3	(United Kingdom) J Murray (Australia) J Peers	4	7^{7}	[10]
(Czech Republic) L Dlouhý (Croatia) M Pavić	6	6^{1}	[6]
(Germany) D Brown (Austria) J Knowle	6	6
(Australia) L Hewitt (Australia) M Matosevic	4	3
PR	(United Kingdom) C Fleming (United Kingdom) R Hutchins	6	6
2	(Colombia) JS Cabal (Colombia) R Farah	1	4

Semifinals
1	(United States) E Butorac (South Africa) R Klaasen	6^{3}	2
3	(United Kingdom) J Murray (Australia) J Peers	7^{7}	6
(Germany) D Brown (Austria) J Knowle	3	2
PR	(United Kingdom) C Fleming (United Kingdom) R Hutchins	6	6

Final
3	(United Kingdom) J Murray (Australia) J Peers	6	6
PR	(United Kingdom) C Fleming (United Kingdom) R Hutchins	4	2
