= 2017 MercedesCup – Singles =

Singles
- 2017 MercedesCup

Final
- Champion: (France) Lucas Pouille
- Runner-up: (Spain) Feliciano López
- Score: 4–6, 7–6^{(7–5)}, 6–4

Details
- Draw: 28 (4 Q / 3 WC )
- Seeds: 8

Events
| Singles | Doubles |
- Stuttgart Open

Fourth-seeded Lucas Pouille defeated Feliciano López in the final, 4–6, 7–6^{(7–5)}, 6–4 to win the singles tennis title at the 2017 Stuttgart Open. Pouille saved a match point en route to the title, in the second round against Jan-Lennard Struff.

Dominic Thiem was the reigning champion, but chose not to participate this year.

== Seeds ==
The top four seeds receive a bye into the second round.

1. (Switzerland) Roger Federer (second round)
2. (Bulgaria) Grigor Dimitrov (second round)
3. (Czech Republic) Tomáš Berdych (quarterfinals)
4. (France) Lucas Pouille (champion)
5. (United States) Steve Johnson (second round)
6. (Germany) Mischa Zverev (semifinals)
7. (France) Gilles Simon (first round)
8. (Serbia) Viktor Troicki (first round)

== Draw ==
Key

- Q = Qualifier
- WC = Wild card
- LL = Lucky loser
- Alt = Alternate
- ITF = ITF entry
- PR = Protected ranking
- SR = Special ranking
- SE = Special exempt
- JE = Junior exempt
- JR = Junior Accelerator Programme entrant
- CO = College Accelerator Programme entrant
- NG = Next Gen Accelerator Program entrant
- w/o = Walkover
- r = Retired
- d = Defaulted

=== Finals ===
Semifinals
6 | (Germany) Mischa Zverev | 7^{7} | 6^{4} | 5
(Spain) Feliciano López | 6^{2} | 7^{7} | 7
4/WC | (France) Lucas Pouille | 7^{7} | 7
(France) Benoît Paire | 6^{5} | 5

Final
(Spain) Feliciano López | 6 | 6^{5} | 4
4/WC | (France) Lucas Pouille | 4 | 7^{7} | 6

=== Top half ===
First round
WC | (Germany) T Haas | 6 | 4 | 7
(France) P-H Herbert | 3 | 6 | 5
Q | (Germany) Y Hanfmann | 6 | 7
Q | (Hungary) M Fucsovics | 3 | 5
(Tunisia) M Jaziri | 3 | 1
6 | (Germany) M Zverev | 6 | 6
(France) S Robert | 1 | 7 | 2
(Australia) B Tomic | 6 | 5 | 6
(Germany) F Mayer | 6^{3} | 6 | 6^{1}
(France) J Chardy | 7^{7} | 4 | 7^{7}
(Spain) F López | 6 | 6
7 | (France) G Simon | 3 | 3

Second round
1 | (Switzerland) R Federer | 6 | 6^{8} | 4
WC | (Germany) T Haas | 2 | 7^{10} | 6
Q | (Germany) Y Hanfmann | 6^{1} | 2
6 | (Germany) M Zverev | 7^{7} | 6
3 | (Czech Republic) T Berdych | 7^{7} | 6
(Australia) B Tomic | 6^{4} | 2
(France) J Chardy | 3 | 6 | 2
(Spain) F López | 6 | 3 | 6

Quarterfinals
WC | (Germany) T Haas | 4 | 4
6 | (Germany) M Zverev | 6 | 6
3 | (Czech Republic) T Berdych | 7^{7} | 3 | 4
(Spain) F López | 6^{4} | 6 | 6

Semifinals
6 | (Germany) M Zverev | 7^{7} | 6^{4} | 5
(Spain) F López | 6^{2} | 7^{7} | 7

=== Bottom half ===
First round
5 | (United States) S Johnson | 3 | 7^{7} | 6
WC | (Germany) M Marterer | 6 | 6^{2} | 4
(Cyprus) M Baghdatis | 1 | 0^{r}
(Germany) P Kohlschreiber | 6 | 0
Q | (Slovakia) L Lacko | 4 | 6^{3}
(Germany) J-L Struff | 6 | 7^{7}
8 | (Serbia) V Troicki | 4 | 4
(France) B Paire | 6 | 6
(Georgia (country)) N Basilashvili | 6 | 3 | 1
Q | (Germany) P Gojowczyk | 2 | 6 | 6
(Russia) A Kuznetsov | 4 | 6 | 3
PR | (Poland) J Janowicz | 6 | 3 | 6

Second round
5 | (United States) S Johnson | 6^{3} | 7 | 6^{6}
(Germany) P Kohlschreiber | 7^{7} | 5 | 7^{8}
(Germany) J-L Struff | 6 | 6^{5} | 6^{8}
4/WC | (France) L Pouille | 4 | 7^{7} | 7^{10}
(France) B Paire | 6 | 6
Q | (Germany) P Gojowczyk | 2 | 4
PR | (Poland) J Janowicz | 7^{7} | 6
2 | (Bulgaria) G Dimitrov | 6^{4} | 3

Quarterfinals
(Germany) P Kohlschreiber | 4 | 6 | 3
4/WC | (France) L Pouille | 6 | 2 | 6
(France) B Paire | 6 | 7^{7}
PR | (Poland) J Janowicz | 1 | 6^{4}

Semifinals
4/WC | (France) L Pouille | 7^{7} | 7
(France) B Paire | 6^{5} | 5

== Qualifying ==
=== Seeds ===
1. (Slovakia) Lukáš Lacko (qualified)
2. (Belgium) Ruben Bemelmans (qualifying competition)
3. (Germany) Maximilian Marterer (Received wildcard to main draw)
4. (United States) Taylor Fritz (first round)
5. (Germany) Peter Gojowczyk (qualified)
6. (Kazakhstan) Alexander Bublik (qualifying competition)
7. (Hungary) Márton Fucsovics (qualified)
8. (France) Vincent Millot (first round)

=== Qualifiers ===
1. (Slovakia) Lukáš Lacko
2. (Germany) Peter Gojowczyk
3. (Germany) Yannick Hanfmann
4. (Hungary) Márton Fucsovics

=== Qualifying draw ===
==== First qualifier ====
First round
1 | (Slovakia) Lukáš Lacko | 6 | 6
(Germany) Daniel Brands | 3 | 4
(Bosnia and Herzegovina) Mirza Bašić | 5 | 3
6 | (Kazakhstan) Alexander Bublik | 7 | 6

Qualifying competition
1 | (Slovakia) Lukáš Lacko | 6 | 7
6 | (Kazakhstan) Alexander Bublik | 3 | 5

==== Second qualifier ====
First round
2 | (Belgium) Ruben Bemelmans | 1 | 6 | 7^{7}
(Japan) Yasutaka Uchiyama | 6 | 3 | 6^{4}
(Germany) Daniel Masur | 7 | 3 | 2
5 | (Germany) Peter Gojowczyk | 5 | 6 | 6

Qualifying competition
2 | (Belgium) Ruben Bemelmans | 4 | 6^{4}
5 | (Germany) Peter Gojowczyk | 6 | 7^{7}

==== Third qualifier ====
First round
Alt | (Germany) Yannick Hanfmann | 6 | 2 | 6
(Czech Republic) Lukáš Rosol | 3 | 6 | 4
WC | (Germany) Yannick Maden | 7 | 5 | 6
8 | (France) Vincent Millot | 5 | 7 | 1

Qualifying competition
Alt | (Germany) Yannick Hanfmann | 6 | 6
WC | (Germany) Yannick Maden | 4 | 1

==== Fourth qualifier ====
First round
4 | (United States) Taylor Fritz | 5 | 6 | 3
(Switzerland) Marco Chiudinelli | 7 | 4 | 6
WC | (Germany) Daniel Altmaier | 3 | 4
7 | (Hungary) Márton Fucsovics | 6 | 6

Qualifying competition
(Switzerland) Marco Chiudinelli | 5 | 5
7 | (Hungary) Márton Fucsovics | 7 | 7
