= Berlin tennis exhibitions =

Exhibition tennis tournament held in July v

bett1Aces

Defunct tennis tournament
- Founded: 2020
- Abolished: 2020
- Location: Berlin, Germany
- Venue: Steffi-Graf-Stadium (13–15 July 2020); Airport Tempelhof (Hangar 6) (17–19 July 2020)
- Surface: Grass and Hard
- Draw: 2 x 6S (Men); 2 x 6S (Women)
- Prize money: €200,000
- Website: bett1aces.de/en/

The Berlin tennis exhibitions (known for sponsorship reasons as the bett1Aces) were two men's and women's exhibition tennis tournaments each, which were held from 13 to 19 July 2020 in Berlin, Germany, during the break of the ATP and WTA Tour due to the COVID-19 pandemic. From 13 to 15 July they took take place at the Steffi-Graf-Stadium on grass, and from 17 to 19 July in a disused hangar of the Airport Tempelhof on hardcourt. Six players each took part in the men's and women's competitions.

Dominic Thiem and Elina Svitolina were the champions of the tournaments at the Steffi-Graf-Stadium, before Thiem again and Anastasija Sevastova won at the Airport Tempelhof.

== Participants ==
=== Men ===
Player	Rank
(Austria) Dominic Thiem	3
(Italy) Matteo Berrettini (Note: Player only competed at the Steffi-Graf-Stadium.)	8
(Spain) Roberto Bautista Agut	12
(Russia) Karen Khachanov (Note: Player only competed at the Airport Tempelhof.)	15
(Germany) Jan-Lennard Struff	34
(Italy) Jannik Sinner	73
(Germany) Tommy Haas	–

Withdrawals

Player	Rank
(Germany) Alexander Zverev	7
(Australia) Nick Kyrgios	40

=== Women ===
Player	Rank
(Ukraine) Elina Svitolina	5
(Netherlands) Kiki Bertens	7
(Czech Republic) Petra Kvitová	12
(Germany) Julia Görges	38
(Latvia) Anastasija Sevastova	43
(Germany) Andrea Petkovic	87
(Germany) Alexandra Vecic	1268

Withdrawals

Player	Rank
(France) Caroline Garcia	46

- Singles rankings as of 16 March 2020 (rankings are frozen until the resumption of the season in August 2020)

== Draws ==
=== Steffi-Graf-Stadium ===
13–15 July 2020 (on grass)

==== Men ====
Quarterfinals				Semifinals					Final
				1	(Austria) Dominic Thiem	6	7^{7}
(Germany) Tommy Haas	4	6	[8]		(Italy) Jannik Sinner	3	6^{5}
(Italy) Jannik Sinner	6	3	[10]						1	(Austria) Dominic Thiem	6^{4}	6	[10]
(Spain) Roberto Bautista Agut	6	3	[10]						2	(Italy) Matteo Berrettini	7^{7}	4	[8]
(Germany) Jan-Lennard Struff	3	6	[7]		(Spain) Roberto Bautista Agut	6	3	[6]
				2	(Italy) Matteo Berrettini	4	6	[10]

==== Women ====
Quarterfinals			Semifinals				Final (Note: The women's final was held at the Airport Tempelhof on hardcourt on 17 July due to rain on the original date on 15 July.)
			1	(Ukraine) Elina Svitolina	7^{7}	6
(Latvia) Anastasija Sevastova	6	4		(Latvia) Anastasija Sevastova	6^{2}	3
(Germany) Julia Görges	3	3^{r}					1	(Ukraine) Elina Svitolina	3	6	[10]
(Germany) Andrea Petkovic	4	1						(Czech Republic) Petra Kvitová	6	1	[5]
(Czech Republic) Petra Kvitová	6	6		(Czech Republic) Petra Kvitová	6	6
			2	(Netherlands) Kiki Bertens	3	2

=== Airport Tempelhof ===
17–19 July 2020 (on hardcourt)

==== Men ====
Quarterfinals
(Germany) Jan-Lennard Struff	6^{5}	6^{3}
(Germany) Tommy Haas	7^{7}	7^{7}
(Italy) Jannik Sinner	6	7^{7}
(Russia) Karen Khachanov	3	6^{3}

Semifinals
1	(Austria) Dominic Thiem	7^{7}	6
(Germany) Tommy Haas	6^{4}	3
(Italy) Jannik Sinner	7^{7}	6
2	(Spain) Roberto Bautista Agut	6^{5}	2

Final
1	(Austria) Dominic Thiem	6	6
(Italy) Jannik Sinner	4	2
3rd place match
Alt	~~(Germany) Tommy Haas~~ Mischa Zverev (Note: Mischa Zverev played as an alternate for Tommy Haas.)	6	6
2	(Spain) Roberto Bautista Agut	4	3

==== Women ====
Quarterfinals
(Latvia) Anastasija Sevastova	6	6
(Netherlands) Kiki Bertens	1	4
(Germany) Alexandra Vecic	2	3
(Germany) Andrea Petkovic	6	6

Semifinals
1	(Ukraine) Elina Svitolina	1	1
(Latvia) Anastasija Sevastova	6	6
(Germany) Andrea Petkovic	6	4	[5]
2	(Czech Republic) Petra Kvitová	3	6	[10]

Final
(Latvia) Anastasija Sevastova	3	6	[10]
2	(Czech Republic) Petra Kvitová	6	3	[5]
3rd place match
1	(Ukraine) Elina Svitolina	4	6^{1}
(Germany) Andrea Petkovic	6	7^{7}
