= 2012 BMW Open – Singles =

Singles
- 2012 BMW Open

Final
- Champion: (Germany) Philipp Kohlschreiber
- Runner-up: (Croatia) Marin Čilić
- Score: 7–6^{(10–8)}, 6–3

Details
- Draw: 28 (4 Q / 2 WC )
- Seeds: 8

Events
Singles	Doubles
← 2011 ·	BMW Open	· 2013 →

Nikolay Davydenko was the defending champion, but lost in the first round to Robert Farah.
Philipp Kohlschreiber won the title defeating Marin Čilić 7–6^{(10–8)}, 6–3 in the final.

== Seeds ==
The top four seeds receive a bye into the second round.

1. (France) Jo-Wilfried Tsonga (second round)
2. (Spain) Feliciano López (semifinals)
3. (Croatia) Marin Čilić (final)
4. (Germany) Philipp Kohlschreiber (champion)
5. (Australia) Bernard Tomic (quarterfinals)
6. (Russia) Mikhail Youzhny (quarterfinals)
7. (Russia) Nikolay Davydenko (first round)
8. (Cyprus) Marcos Baghdatis (quarterfinals)

== Draw ==
=== Key ===
- Q = Qualifier
- WC = Wild card
- LL = Lucky loser
- Alt = Alternate
- SE = Special exempt
- PR = Protected ranking
- ITF = ITF entry
- JE = Junior exempt
- w/o = Walkover
- r = Retired
- d = Defaulted
- SR = Special ranking

=== Finals ===
Semifinals
WC	(Germany) Tommy Haas	3	4
3	(Croatia) Marin Čilić	6	6
4	(Germany) Philipp Kohlschreiber	6	6^{4}	6
2	(Spain) Feliciano López	2	7^{7}	4

Final
3	(Croatia) Marin Čilić	6^{8}	3
4	(Germany) Philipp Kohlschreiber	7^{10}	6

=== Top half ===
First round
WC	(Germany) M Berrer	0	2
WC	(Germany) T Haas	6	6
Q	(Germany) D Brown	6	6
(Germany) D Brands	4	3
(Germany) T Kamke	1	6	3
8	(Cyprus) M Baghdatis	6	3	6
(Colombia) A Falla	6^{3}	2
(Germany) M Bachinger	7^{7}	6
(Belgium) S Darcis	4	3
(Colombia) S Giraldo	6	6
(Germany) P Petzschner	5	5
6	(Russia) M Youzhny	7	7

Second round
1	(France) J-W Tsonga	1	4
WC	(Germany) T Haas	6	6
Q	(Germany) D Brown	6	4	4
8	(Cyprus) M Baghdatis	1	6	6
3	(Croatia) M Čilić	6	6
(Germany) M Bachinger	3	2
(Colombia) S Giraldo	7^{7}	4	4
6	(Russia) M Youzhny	6^{2}	6	6

Quarterfinals
WC	(Germany) T Haas	6	7^{7}
8	(Cyprus) M Baghdatis	1	6^{3}
3	(Croatia) M Čilić	6	6^{6}	6
6	(Russia) M Youzhny	3	7^{8}	3

Semifinals
WC	(Germany) T Haas	3	4
3	(Croatia) M Čilić	6	6

=== Bottom half ===
First round
7	(Russia) N Davydenko	3	2
Q	(Colombia) R Farah	6	6
Q	(Australia) M Matosevic	7	6
(Kazakhstan) M Kukushkin	5	1
(Latvia) E Gulbis	6	6
(Belgium) X Malisse	4	2
5	(Australia) B Tomic	6	6
(Belgium) O Rochus	4	3
(Italy) P Starace	6	7^{7}
Q	(Belgium) D Goffin	3	6^{3}
(Germany) C-M Stebe	6^{3}	3
(Ukraine) S Stakhovsky	7^{7}	6

Second round
Q	(Colombia) R Farah	1	7^{7}	2
Q	(Australia) M Matosevic	6	6^{2}	6
(Latvia) E Gulbis	5	3
4	(Germany) P Kohlschreiber	7	6
5	(Australia) B Tomic	6	6^{4}	6
(Italy) P Starace	1	7^{7}	3
(Ukraine) S Stakhovsky	4	6^{4}
2	(Spain) F López	6	7^{7}

Quarterfinals
Q	(Australia) M Matosevic	0	6^{5}
4	(Germany) P Kohlschreiber	6	7^{7}
5	(Australia) B Tomic	4	2
2	(Spain) F López	6	6

Semifinals
4	(Germany) P Kohlschreiber	6	6^{4}	6
2	(Spain) F López	2	7^{7}	4

== Qualifying ==
=== Seeds ===
1. (Belgium) David Goffin (qualified)
2. (Australia) Marinko Matosevic (qualified)
3. (Kazakhstan) Andrey Golubev (first round, retired because of a left knee injury)
4. (Germany) Dustin Brown (qualified)
5. (Germany) Peter Gojowczyk (qualifying competition)
6. (Germany) Simon Greul (second round)
7. (Austria) Martin Fischer (qualifying competition)
8. (Germany) Stefan Seifert (first round)

=== Qualifiers ===
1. (Belgium) David Goffin
2. (Australia) Marinko Matosevic
3. (Colombia) Robert Farah
4. (Germany) Dustin Brown

=== Draw ===
==== First qualifier ====
First round
(Germany) Dennis Blömke	7^{7}	3	2
(Germany) Stephan Hoiss	6^{5}	6	6
(Germany) Nils Langer	5	6^{1}
(Germany) Dieter Kindlmann	7	7^{7}
WC	(Germany) Julian Lenz	2	3
6	(Germany) Simon Greul	6	6

Second round
1	(Belgium) David Goffin	6	6
(Germany) Stephan Hoiss	2	2
(Germany) Dieter Kindlmann	7	7^{7}
6	(Germany) Simon Greul	5	6^{5}

Qualifying competition
1	(Belgium) David Goffin	1	6	6
(Germany) Dieter Kindlmann	6	3	4

==== Second qualifier ====
First round
2	(Australia) Marinko Matosevic	6	6
(Czech Republic) František Čermák	3	2
(Germany) Kevin Krawietz	6	2	6
(Germany) Jan-Lennard Struff	3	6	1
(Germany) Marc Sieber	6	2
(Russia) Ivan Nedelko	4	0^{r}
WC	(Georgia (country)) Lado Chikhladze	4	1
5	(Germany) Peter Gojowczyk	6	6

Second round
2	(Australia) Marinko Matosevic	6	6
(Germany) Kevin Krawietz	4	3
(Germany) Marc Sieber	3	5
5	(Germany) Peter Gojowczyk	6	7

Qualifying competition
2	(Australia) Marinko Matosevic	6	6
5	(Germany) Peter Gojowczyk	2	3

==== Third qualifier ====
First round
3	(Kazakhstan) Andrey Golubev	1	0^{r}
(Germany) Dominik Meffert	6	1
(Germany) Frank Moser	6^{1}	6	3
WC	(Germany) Benedikt Dorsch	7^{7}	4	6
(Germany) Maximilian Kolleritsch	2	1
(Colombia) Robert Farah	6	6
(Colombia) Alejandro González	6	4	6
8	(Germany) Stefan Seifert	3	6	3

Second round
(Germany) Dominik Meffert	6	6
(Germany) Benedikt Dorsch	3	1
(Colombia) Robert Farah	6	6
(Colombia) Alejandro González	3	4

Qualifying competition
(Germany) Dominik Meffert	4	2
(Colombia) Robert Farah	6	6

==== Fourth qualifier ====
First round
4	(Germany) Dustin Brown	6	6
(Russia) Philip Davydenko	3	3
(Slovakia) Ivo Klec	6	3	3
(Colombia) Juan Sebastián Cabal	4	6	6
WC	(Germany) Valentino Pest	3	5
(Switzerland) Alexander Ritschard	6	7
(Germany) Alex Satschko	6	3	2
7	(Austria) Martin Fischer	3	6	6

Second round
4	(Germany) Dustin Brown	6	6
(Colombia) Juan Sebastián Cabal	4	1
(Switzerland) Alexander Ritschard	3	3
7	(Austria) Martin Fischer	6	6

Qualifying competition
4	(Germany) Dustin Brown	7	6
7	(Austria) Martin Fischer	6^{5}	4
