= 2014 BMW Open =

- Date: 28 April – 4 May
- Edition: 99th
- Category: ATP World Tour 250 series
- Draw: 28S / 16D
- Prize money: €426,605
- Surface: Clay
- Location: Munich, Germany
- Venue: MTTC Iphitos

Champions

Singles
- (Slovakia) Martin Kližan

Doubles
- (United Kingdom) Jamie Murray / (Australia) John Peers
← 2013 ·	BMW Open	· 2015 →

The 2014 BMW Open was a men's tennis tournament played on outdoor clay courts. It was the 99th edition of the event, and part of the ATP World Tour 250 series of the 2014 ATP World Tour. It took place at the MTTC Iphitos complex in Munich, Germany, from 28 April through 4 May 2014. Unseeded Martin Kližan won the singles title.

== Points and prize money ==
=== Point distribution ===
Event	W	F	SF	QF	Round of 16	Round of 32	Q	Q3	Q2	Q1
Singles	250	150	90	45	20	0	12	6	0	0
Doubles	250	150	90	45	0	—	—	—	—	—

=== Prize money ===
Event	W	F	SF	QF	Round of 16	Round of 32	Q3	Q2	Q1
Singles	€77,315	€40,720	€22,060	€12,565	€7,405	€4,385	€710	€340	—
Doubles *	€23,500	€12,350	€6,690	€3,830	€2,240	—	—	—	—

_{* per team}

== Singles main draw entrants ==
=== Seeds ===
Country	Player	Rank^{1}	Seed
ITA	Fabio Fognini	13	1
GER	Tommy Haas	14	2
RUS	Mikhail Youzhny	15	3
~~FRA~~	~~Gaël Monfils~~	~~24~~	~~4~~
GER	Philipp Kohlschreiber	26	5
ESP	Feliciano López	30	6
ITA	Andreas Seppi	35	7
CRO	Ivan Dodig	37	8

- Rankings are as of April 21, 2014.

=== Other entrants ===
The following players received wildcards into the main draw:

- (Germany) Dustin Brown
- (Germany) Peter Gojowczyk
- (Germany) Alexander Zverev

The following players received entry from the qualifying draw:

- (Brazil) Thomaz Bellucci
- (Slovakia) Martin Kližan
- (Spain) Albert Ramos
- (Germany) Jan-Lennard Struff

The following players received entry as lucky losers:

- (Lithuania) Ričardas Berankis
- (Germany) Michael Berrer

=== Withdrawals ===
Before the tournament

- (Germany) Florian Mayer
- (France) Gaël Monfils
- (Canada) Vasek Pospisil
- (Czech Republic) Jiří Veselý (left Achilles tendon injury)

=== Retirements ===
- (Poland) Michał Przysiężny (right ankle strain)

== Doubles main draw entrants ==
=== Seeds ===
Country	Player	Country	Player	Rank^{1}	Seed
USA	Eric Butorac	RSA	Raven Klaasen	56	1
COL	Juan Sebastián Cabal	COL	Robert Farah	60	2
GBR	Jamie Murray	AUS	John Peers	67	3
POL	Tomasz Bednarek	CRO	Marin Draganja	94	4

- Rankings are as of April 21, 2014.

=== Other entrants ===
The following pairs received wildcards into the doubles main draw:

- (Germany) Matthias Bachinger / (Germany) Kevin Krawietz
- (Germany) Alexander Satschko / (Germany) Jan-Lennard Struff

== Champions ==
=== Singles ===
- (Slovakia) Martin Kližan defeated (Italy) Fabio Fognini 2–6, 6–1, 6–2

=== Doubles ===
- (United Kingdom) Jamie Murray / (Australia) John Peers defeated (United Kingdom) Colin Fleming / (United Kingdom) Ross Hutchins, 6–4, 6–2
