= 2017 MercedesCup =

- Date: 12–19 June
- Edition: 40th
- Category: ATP World Tour 250 series
- Draw: 28S / 16D
- Prize money: €630,785
- Surface: Grass
- Location: Stuttgart, Germany
- Venue: Tennis Club Weissenhof

Champions

Singles
- (France) Lucas Pouille

Doubles
- (United Kingdom) Jamie Murray / (Brazil) Bruno Soares
- Stuttgart Open

The 2017 MercedesCup was a men's tennis tournament played on outdoor grass courts. It was the 40th edition of the Stuttgart Open, and part of the ATP World Tour 250 series of the 2017 ATP World Tour. It was held at the Tennis Club Weissenhof in Stuttgart, Germany, from 12 June until 19 June 2017. Fourth-seeded Lucas Pouille won the singles title.

== Finals ==
=== Singles ===
- (France) Lucas Pouille defeated (Spain) Feliciano López, 4–6, 7–6^{(7–5)}, 6–4

=== Doubles ===
- (United Kingdom) Jamie Murray / (Brazil) Bruno Soares defeated (Austria) Oliver Marach / (Croatia) Mate Pavić, 6–7^{(4–7)}, 7–5, [10–5]

== Singles main-draw entrants ==
=== Seeds ===
Country	Player	Rank^{1}	Seed
SUI	Roger Federer	5	1
BUL	Grigor Dimitrov	13	2
CZE	Tomáš Berdych	14	3
FRA	Lucas Pouille	17	4
USA	Steve Johnson	26	5
GER	Mischa Zverev	31	6
FRA	Gilles Simon	32	7
SRB	Viktor Troicki	35	8

- ^{1} Rankings are as of May 29, 2017

=== Other entrants ===
The following players received wildcards into the singles main draw:

- (Germany) Tommy Haas
- (Germany) Maximilian Marterer
- (France) Lucas Pouille

The following players received entry using a protected ranking:

- (Poland) Jerzy Janowicz

The following players received entry from the qualifying draw:

- (Hungary) Márton Fucsovics
- (Germany) Peter Gojowczyk
- (Germany) Yannick Hanfmann
- (Slovakia) Lukáš Lacko

=== Withdrawals ===
Before the tournament

- (Russia) Karen Khachanov →replaced by (Poland) Jerzy Janowicz
- (Czech Republic) Jiří Veselý →replaced by (France) Stéphane Robert

=== Retirements ===
- (Cyprus) Marcos Baghdatis

== Doubles main-draw entrants ==
=== Seeds ===
Country	Player	Country	Player	Rank^{1}	Seed
USA	Bob Bryan	USA	Mike Bryan	12	1
GBR	Jamie Murray	BRA	Bruno Soares	17	2
ROU	Florin Mergea	PAK	Aisam-ul-Haq Qureshi	52	3
AUT	Oliver Marach	CRO	Mate Pavić	67	4

- Rankings are as of May 29, 2017

=== Other entrants ===
The following pairs received wildcards into the doubles main draw:

- (Germany) Andre Begemann / (Germany) Jan-Lennard Struff
- (Germany) Tommy Haas / (Germany) Florian Mayer

=== Withdrawals ===
Before the tournament

- (Philippines) Treat Huey

During the tournament

- (Germany) Tommy Haas
