= 2014 BMW Open – Singles =

Singles
- 2014 BMW Open

Final
- Champion: (Slovakia) Martin Kližan
- Runner-up: (Italy) Fabio Fognini
- Score: 2–6, 6–1, 6–2

Details
- Draw: 28 (4 Q / 3 WC )
- Seeds: 8

Events
Singles	Doubles
- BMW Open

Tommy Haas was the defending champion but lost to Martin Kližan in the semifinals. Kližan went on to win the title, defeating Fabio Fognini in the final, 2–6, 6–1, 6–2.

== Seeds ==
The top four seeds receive a bye into the second round.

1. (Italy) Fabio Fognini (final)
2. (Germany) Tommy Haas (semifinals)
3. (Russia) Mikhail Youzhny (second round)
4. (France) Gaël Monfils (withdrew)
5. (Germany) Philipp Kohlschreiber (first round)
6. (Spain) Feliciano López (first round)
7. (Italy) Andreas Seppi (quarterfinals)
8. (Croatia) Ivan Dodig (first round)

== Draw ==
Key

- Q = Qualifier
- WC = Wild card
- LL = Lucky loser
- Alt = Alternate
- ITF = ITF entry
- PR = Protected ranking
- SR = Special ranking
- SE = Special exempt
- JE = Junior exempt
- JR = Junior Accelerator Programme entrant
- CO = College Accelerator Programme entrant
- NG = Next Gen Accelerator Program entrant
- w/o = Walkover
- r = Retired
- d = Defaulted

=== Finals ===
Semifinals
1	(Italy) Fabio Fognini	6	6
Q	(Germany) Jan-Lennard Struff	3	1
Q	(Slovakia) Martin Kližan	6	6
2	(Germany) Tommy Haas	3	2

Final
1	(Italy) Fabio Fognini	6	1	2
Q	(Slovakia) Martin Kližan	2	6	6

=== Top half ===
First round
(Croatia) I Karlović	6^{4}	6^{5}
WC	(Germany) D Brown	7^{7}	7^{7}
(Russia) N Davydenko	2	6^{4}
(Argentina) F Delbonis	6	7^{7}
Q	(Brazil) T Bellucci	7^{7}	6
8	(Croatia) I Dodig	6^{0}	4
WC	(Germany) A Zverev	1	2
(Austria) J Melzer	6	6
(Ukraine) S Stakhovsky	3	6	6
WC	(Germany) P Gojowczyk	6	4	1
Q	(Germany) J-L Struff	6	6
6	(Spain) F López	3	4

Second round
1	(Italy) F Fognini	7^{7}	6
WC	(Germany) D Brown	6^{4}	2
(Argentina) F Delbonis	7	3	2
Q	(Brazil) T Bellucci	5	6	6
LL	(Lithuania) R Berankis	7^{7}	3	7^{8}
(Austria) J Melzer	6^{5}	6	6^{6}
(Ukraine) S Stakhovsky	3	3
Q	(Germany) J-L Struff	6	6

Quarterfinals
1	(Italy) F Fognini	6	6
Q	(Brazil) T Bellucci	2	2
LL	(Lithuania) R Berankis	6	3	4
Q	(Germany) J-L Struff	4	6	6

Semifinals
1	(Italy) F Fognini	6	6
Q	(Germany) J-L Struff	3	1

=== Bottom half ===
First round
5	(Germany) P Kohlschreiber	5	6	4
(Uzbekistan) D Istomin	7	2	6
(Poland) M Przysiężny	6	5^{r}
(Australia) M Matosevic	2	6
(Israel) D Sela	1	2
Q	(Slovakia) M Kližan	6	6
7	(Italy) A Seppi	6	7
LL	(Germany) M Berrer	3	5
Q	(Spain) A Ramos	6^{6}	6	6
(Australia) L Hewitt	7^{8}	1	0
(Colombia) A Falla	6	6
(Finland) J Nieminen	2	1

Second round
(Uzbekistan) D Istomin	6^{6}	6	7
(Australia) M Matosevic	7^{8}	3	5
Q	(Slovakia) M Kližan	6^{5}	6	7^{7}
3	(Russia) M Youzhny	7^{7}	2	6^{2}
7	(Italy) A Seppi	6	6
Q	(Spain) A Ramos	3	4
(Colombia) A Falla	2	4
2	(Germany) T Haas	6	6

Quarterfinals
(Uzbekistan) D Istomin	6^{3}	6	1
Q	(Slovakia) M Kližan	7^{7}	1	6
7	(Italy) A Seppi	3	6	3
2	(Germany) T Haas	6	3	6

Semifinals
Q	(Slovakia) M Kližan	6	6
2	(Germany) T Haas	3	2

== Qualifying ==
=== Seeds ===
1. (Germany) Jan-Lennard Struff (qualified)
2. (Spain) Albert Ramos (qualified)
3. (Slovakia) Martin Kližan (qualified)
4. (Brazil) Thomaz Bellucci (qualified)
5. (Germany) Michael Berrer (qualifying competition, lucky loser)
6. (Lithuania) Ričardas Berankis (qualifying competition, lucky loser)
7. (Slovakia) Norbert Gomboš (qualifying competition)
8. (Belgium) Ruben Bemelmans (qualifying competition)

=== Qualifiers ===
1. (Germany) Jan-Lennard Struff
2. (Spain) Albert Ramos
3. (Slovakia) Martin Kližan
4. (Brazil) Thomaz Bellucci

=== Lucky losers ===
1. (Germany) Michael Berrer
2. (Lithuania) Ričardas Berankis

=== Qualifying draw ===
==== First qualifier ====
First round
1	(Germany) Jan-Lennard Struff	6	6
(Bosnia and Herzegovina) Mirza Bašić	3	4
(Germany) Kevin Krawietz	6	6
WC	(Germany) Maximilian Marterer	2	4
(Germany) Moritz Baumann	6	3	2
(Croatia) Filip Veger	4	6	6
(Switzerland) Henri Laaksonen	1	5
5	(Germany) Michael Berrer	6	7

Second round
1	(Germany) Jan-Lennard Struff	6	6
(Germany) Kevin Krawietz	3	3
(Croatia) Filip Veger	5	4
5	(Germany) Michael Berrer	7	6

Qualifying competition
1	(Germany) Jan-Lennard Struff	6	6
5	(Germany) Michael Berrer	1	1

==== Second qualifier ====
First round
2	(Spain) Albert Ramos	6	6
WC	(Germany) Adrian Obert	2	1
(Belarus) Egor Gerasimov	2	0
(Switzerland) Yann Marti	6	6
(Bosnia and Herzegovina) Aldin Šetkić	3	6	6
(Georgia (country)) Nikoloz Basilashvili	6	3	4
(Italy) Walter Trusendi	4	2
7	(Slovakia) Norbert Gomboš	6	6

Second round
2	(Spain) Albert Ramos	3	6	6
(Switzerland) Yann Marti	6	1	2
(Bosnia and Herzegovina) Aldin Šetkić	3	1
7	(Slovakia) Norbert Gomboš	6	6

Qualifying competition
2	(Spain) Albert Ramos	6	5	6
7	(Slovakia) Norbert Gomboš	4	7	4

==== Third qualifier ====
First round
3	(Slovakia) Martin Kližan	6	7
(Kazakhstan) Evgeny Korolev	3	5
(Croatia) Mate Pavić	3	5
(Austria) Martin Fischer	6	7
WC	(Germany) Tobias Simon	6	6
(Austria) Marc Rath	3	3
(Germany) Matthias Bachinger	1	4
6	(Lithuania) Ričardas Berankis	6	6

Second round
3	(Slovakia) Martin Kližan	3	6	7^{7}
(Austria) Martin Fischer	6	2	6^{1}
WC	(Germany) Tobias Simon	6^{5}	3
6	(Lithuania) Ričardas Berankis	7^{7}	6

Qualifying competition
3	(Slovakia) Martin Kližan	6	6
6	(Lithuania) Ričardas Berankis	3	4

==== Fourth qualifier ====
First round
4	(Brazil) Thomaz Bellucci	4	6	6
(Austria) Bastian Trinker	6	3	1
(Russia) Alexey Vatutin	6	3
WC	(Germany) Stephan Hoiß	0	0^{r}
(Slovakia) Ivo Klec	4	4
(Croatia) Dino Marcan	6	6
(Croatia) Duje Kekez	4	3
8	(Belgium) Ruben Bemelmans	6	6

Second round
4	(Brazil) Thomaz Bellucci	6	7^{7}
(Russia) Alexey Vatutin	3	6^{3}
(Croatia) Dino Marcan	6^{3}	3
8	(Belgium) Ruben Bemelmans	7^{7}	6

Qualifying competition
4	(Brazil) Thomaz Bellucci	6	6
8	(Belgium) Ruben Bemelmans	0	3

== Bibliography ==
- Main Draw
- Qualifying Draw
