= 2012 BMW Open =

- Date: 30 April – 6 May
- Edition: 97th
- Category: World Tour 250
- Surface: Clay / outdoor
- Location: Munich, Germany
- Venue: MTTC Iphitos

Champions

Singles
- (Germany) Philipp Kohlschreiber

Doubles
- (Czech Republic) František Čermák / (Slovakia) Filip Polášek
- BMW Open

The 2012 BMW Open (also known as The BMW Open by FWU Takaful 2012 for sponsorship reasons) was a men's tennis tournament played on outdoor clay courts. It was the 97th edition of the event. It was part of the ATP World Tour 250 series of the 2012 ATP World Tour. It took place at the MTTC Iphitos complex in Munich, Germany, from 30 April through 6 May 2012. Fourth-seeded Philipp Kohlschreiber won the singles title.

== Singles main draw entrants ==
=== Seeds ===
| Country | Player | Rank^{1} | Seed |
|---|---|---|---|
| FRA | Jo-Wilfried Tsonga | 5 | 1 |
| ESP | Feliciano López | 16 | 2 |
| CRO | Marin Čilić | 23 | 3 |
| GER | Philipp Kohlschreiber | 33 | 4 |
| AUS | Bernard Tomic | 35 | 5 |
| RUS | Mikhail Youzhny | 36 | 6 |
| RUS | Nikolay Davydenko | 40 | 7 |
| CYP | Marcos Baghdatis | 41 | 8 |

- Seedings are based on the rankings of April 23, 2012

=== Other entrants ===
The following players received wildcards into the main draw:

- (Germany) Michael Berrer
- (Germany) Daniel Brands
- (Germany) Tommy Haas

The following players received entry from the qualifying draw:

- (Germany) Dustin Brown
- (Colombia) Robert Farah
- (Belgium) David Goffin
- (Australia) Marinko Matosevic

=== Withdrawals ===
- (Spain) Nicolás Almagro
- (Brazil) Thomaz Bellucci
- (Czech Republic) Radek Štěpánek

== Doubles main draw entrants ==
=== Seeds ===
| Country | Player | Country | Player | Rank^{1} | Seed |
|---|---|---|---|---|---|
| CZE | František Čermák | SVK | Filip Polášek | 44 | 1 |
| AUT | Oliver Marach | AUT | Alexander Peya | 51 | 2 |
| MEX | Santiago González | GER | Christopher Kas | 57 | 3 |
| COL | Juan Sebastián Cabal | COL | Robert Farah | 88 | 4 |

- Rankings are as of April 23, 2012

=== Other entrants ===
The following pairs received wildcards into the doubles main draw:

- (Germany) Daniel Brands / (Germany) Kevin Krawietz
- (Germany) Tommy Haas / (Germany) Philipp Petzschner

== Finals ==
=== Singles ===
- (Germany) Philipp Kohlschreiber defeated (Croatia) Marin Čilić, 7–6^{(10–8)}, 6–3
- It was Kohlschreiber's 1st title of the year and 4th of his career. It was his 2nd win at Munich, also winning in 2007.

=== Doubles ===
- (Czech Republic) František Čermák / (Slovakia) Filip Polášek defeated (Belgium) Xavier Malisse / (Belgium) Dick Norman, 6–4, 7–5
