= Tommy Haas =

German tennis player (born 1978)

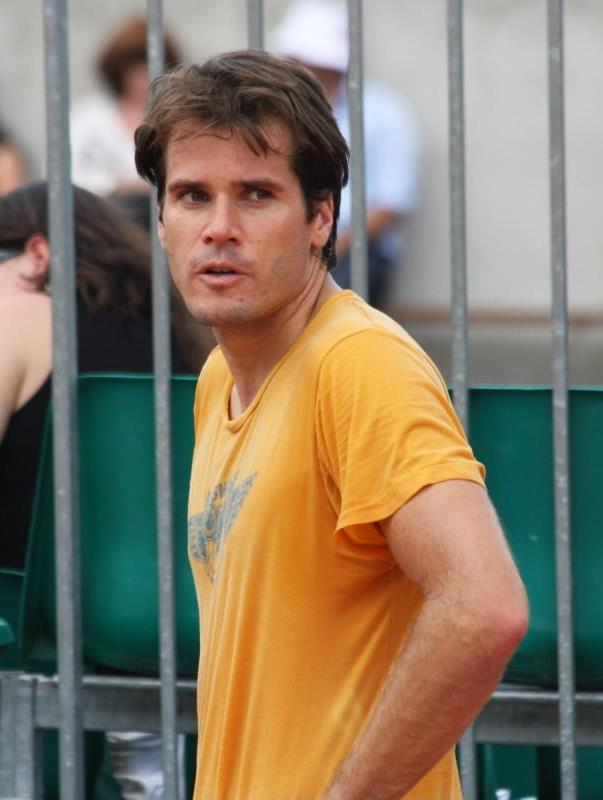
- Haas at the 2009 French Open
- Full name: Thomas Mario Haas
- Country (sports): Germany
- Born: 3 April 1978 (age 48) Hamburg, West Germany
- Height: 1.88 m (6 ft 2 in)
- Turned pro: 1996
- Retired: 2018
- Plays: Right-handed (one-handed backhand)
- Prize money: US$13,609,987

Singles
- Career record: 569–338 (62.7%)
- Career titles: 15
- Highest ranking: No. 2 (13 May 2002)

Grand Slam singles results
- Australian Open: SF (1999, 2002, 2007)
- French Open: QF (2013)
- Wimbledon: SF (2009)
- US Open: QF (2004, 2006, 2007)

Other tournaments
- Grand Slam Cup: F (1999)
- Olympic Games: F (2000)

Doubles
- Career record: 74–86
- Career titles: 1
- Highest ranking: No. 82 (3 February 2014)

Grand Slam doubles results
- French Open: 1R (2011)
- US Open: 3R (2015)

Other doubles tournaments
- Olympic Games: QF (2000)

Team competitions
- Davis Cup: SF (2007)
Medal record
Olympic Games
Silver medal – second place	2000 Sydney	Singles

Thomas Mario Haas (German pronunciation: [ˈtɔmi ˈhaːs]; born 3 April 1978) is a German former professional tennis player. He competed on the ATP Tour from 1996 to 2017, and was ranked world No. 2 in men's singles by the Association of Tennis Professionals (ATP) in May 2002. Haas won 15 career titles in singles, including a Masters title at the 2001 Stuttgart Masters, and a silver medal at the 2000 Sydney Olympics. He reached the semifinals of the Australian Open three times, and in Wimbledon once. He reached the quarterfinal stage at each of the majors.

== Early life ==
Born in Hamburg, Germany to Brigitte and Peter Haas, Tommy started playing his own version of tennis when he was four years old, using a wooden plank to hit balls against the wall or into his father's hands. When his father observed his talents, he started bringing Haas to work, as he was a tennis coach.

At five, Haas won his first youth tournament, in Hamburg. At eight, he won his second, in Munich. Between 11 and 13, Haas twice won the Austrian Championship, the German Championship, and the European Championship.

Haas's talents were noted by tennis guru Nick Bollettieri. He was so impressed by the young German's talent that he offered Haas the chance to stay and train at his Bollettieri Academy in Bradenton, Florida, for free, and Haas began attending at age 11. At 13, speaking little English, Haas moved full-time to Florida to train at the academy.

His sister, Sabine, also played professional tennis.

== Tennis career ==
=== Juniors ===
As a junior Haas reached as high as No. 11 in the junior world singles rankings in 1995 (and No. 5 in doubles).

=== 1996–2000: World Team Cup champion, first title, Grand Slam Cup final, Olympic Silver ===
In 1996, Haas became a professional tennis player. He played his first Grand Slam tournament at the US Open, losing in the first round to compatriot Michael Stich in four sets. He gained attention as a future star when he won his first ATP title in 1999, made it to the semifinals of the Australian Open, and was a finalist in the Grand Slam Cup. The following year, he won a silver medal at the Sydney Olympics defeating Wayne Ferreira, Andreas Vinciguerra, Àlex Corretja, Max Mirnyi and Roger Federer en route to the gold medal match where he lost to Yevgeny Kafelnikov. He also beat Andre Agassi at the 1998 Wimbledon Championships in the second round.

=== 2001–2005: World No. 2, Masters champion, second World Team Cup victory and injuries ===
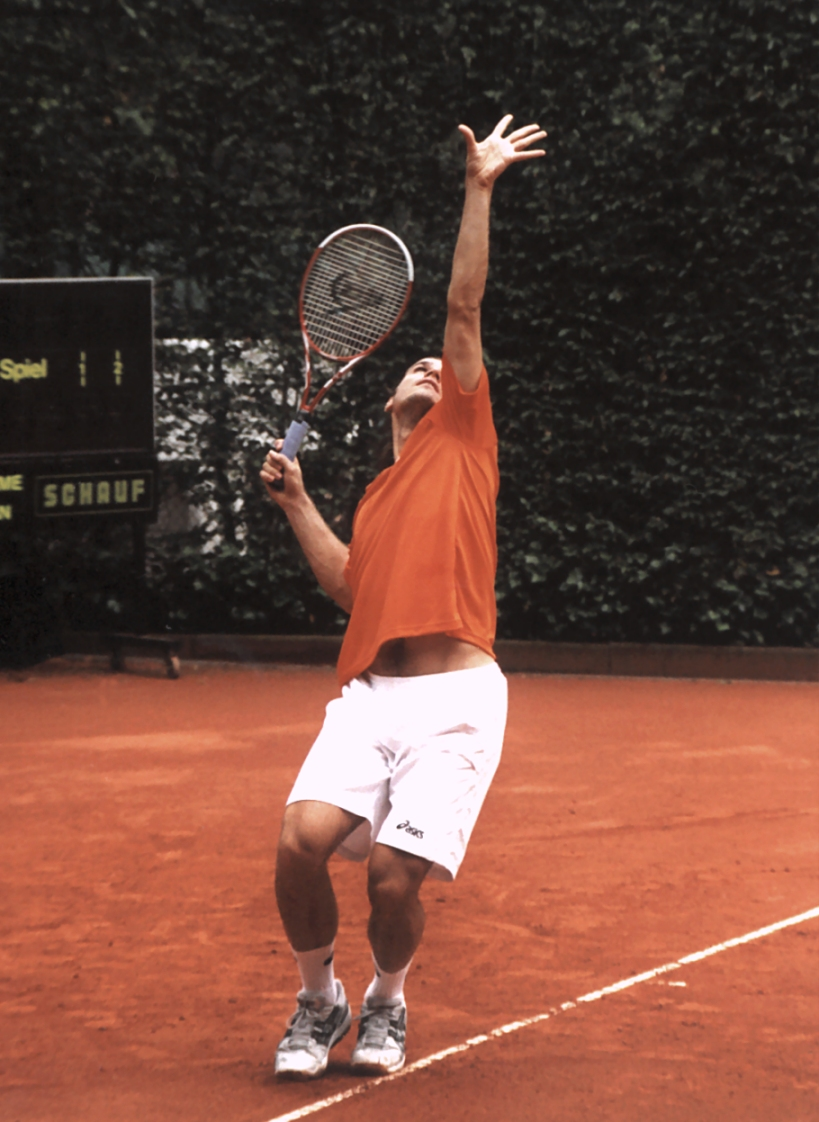
Haas at the public training for the World Team Cup in Düsseldorf, 2005

In 2001, he won four ATP titles, including his first Masters shield, finishing 2001 as world No. 8 and only missing out on playing in the season-ending Masters Cup because of Goran Ivanišević's Wimbledon victory, which meant Ivanišević took the eighth and final spot. In the 2002 Australian Open, he won in five sets against Todd Martin and Roger Federer, and in four against Marcelo Ríos to reach the semifinals. He led Marat Safin two sets to one but suffered from a stiff shoulder after a rain delay, and Safin won the match, taking the final two sets 6–0, 6–2. Haas was quickly rising to the top of the tennis ranks when his career was suddenly halted at No. 2 in the world by a severe accident that nearly claimed the lives of his parents, leaving his father in a coma. Haas spent much of 2002 taking care of his family. At the end of this lay-off, he injured his shoulder, requiring a major operation. He was plagued by further injuries and related complications afterwards and did not return to professional tennis fully until 2004. Before his parents' accident and his injuries, he had a winning record against several former and future No. 1 ranked players: 3–0 against Andy Roddick, 2–1 against Roger Federer, 2–1 against Marat Safin, and 2–0 against Jim Courier, as well as 5–5 against Pete Sampras. Haas won two more ATP titles in his return year of 2004, while trying to gain back his form.

=== 2006: Three titles, second US Open quarterfinal ===
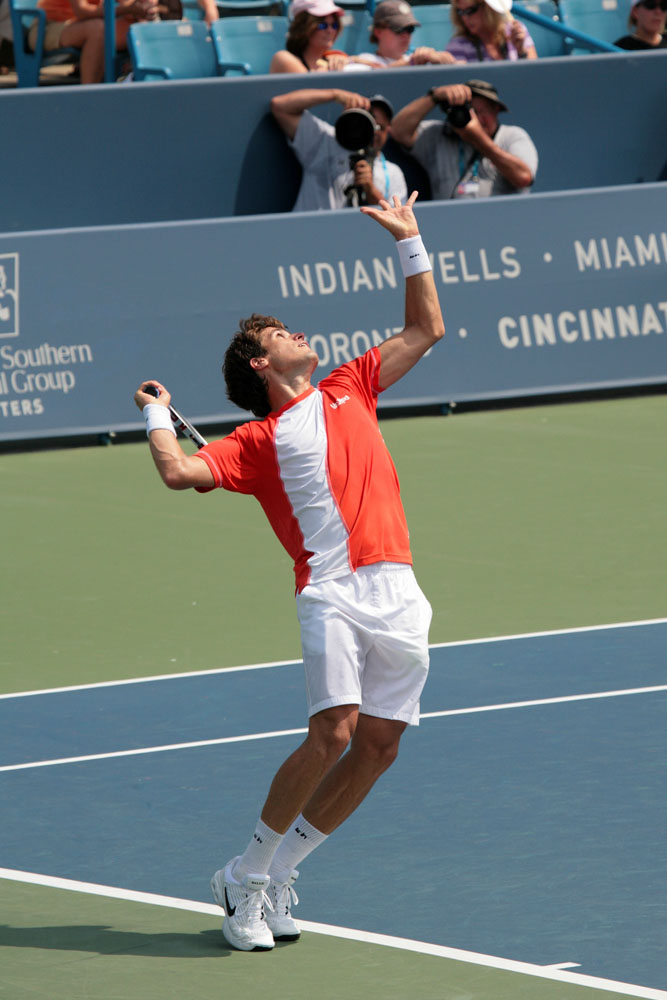
Haas at the 2006 Cincinnati Masters

In 2006, Haas won three ATP tournaments and reached the quarterfinals at the US Open, where he was knocked out by Nikolay Davydenko after having been up two sets. Haas began having severe cramps in his legs in the third set. During the match he was visibly disturbed, repeatedly hitting his legs with his racquet, frustrated at the cramps.

At the end of the year, he had to win the Paris Masters to qualify for the Masters Cup, the ATP year-end final. He lost after a semifinal run to Dominik Hrbatý with health problems and did not play again for the rest of the year.

=== 2007: Australian Open and Davis Cup semifinals, back to top 10 ===
In 2007, Haas, with his long hair now cut short, had battled his way to his third Australian Open semifinal, which included matches against David Nalbandian and a five-set quarterfinal rematch against Nikolay Davydenko. He lost his semifinal match against first-time Grand Slam finalist Fernando González from Chile in straight sets. Despite this loss, Haas returned to the top 10 of the world rankings for the first time since 2002.

On 25 February, at the Regions Morgan Keegan Championships in Memphis, Haas stopped Andy Roddick's quest for the final, winning in two sets. This was the first time Haas had won a title without facing a single break point in any of his matches, as well as the first time he had won titles in consecutive seasons. Haas also became only the second player to win three titles at Memphis, the other being Jimmy Connors, who won in 1979, 1983, and 1984.

Haas reached the quarterfinals of the Pacific Life Open, an ATP Masters Series tournament held in Indian Wells, California, where he lost to Andy Murray in a third-set tiebreaker. In the 2007 ATP Champion's Race, Haas, the 13th seed (10th-ranked), not known for being much of a grass court player, advanced to the fourth round at Wimbledon for the first time, defeating Zack Fleishman, Tomáš Zíb, and No. 21 seed Dmitry Tursunov. His run came to an end after he suffered a torn abdominal muscle and had to withdraw a day before playing Roger Federer.

At the US Open, Haas equaled his best result in New York by reaching the quarterfinals with five-set wins over Sébastien Grosjean and James Blake. He beat Blake in a fifth-set tiebreak, saving match points. His run ended, however, with a three-set loss to Nikolay Davydenko.

=== 2008–2009: Injuries, Wimbledon semifinal, return to top 20 ===
In the first half of 2008, Haas was derailed by injuries, causing him to miss both the Australian Open and the French Open. This dropped him significantly in the rankings, as he was unable to back up his semifinal performance at the Australian Open the year before. He made it to the quarterfinals of the Pacific Life Open in Indian Wells, defeating Andy Murray in three sets. He was then forced to withdraw from his quarterfinal match against Roger Federer due to injury.

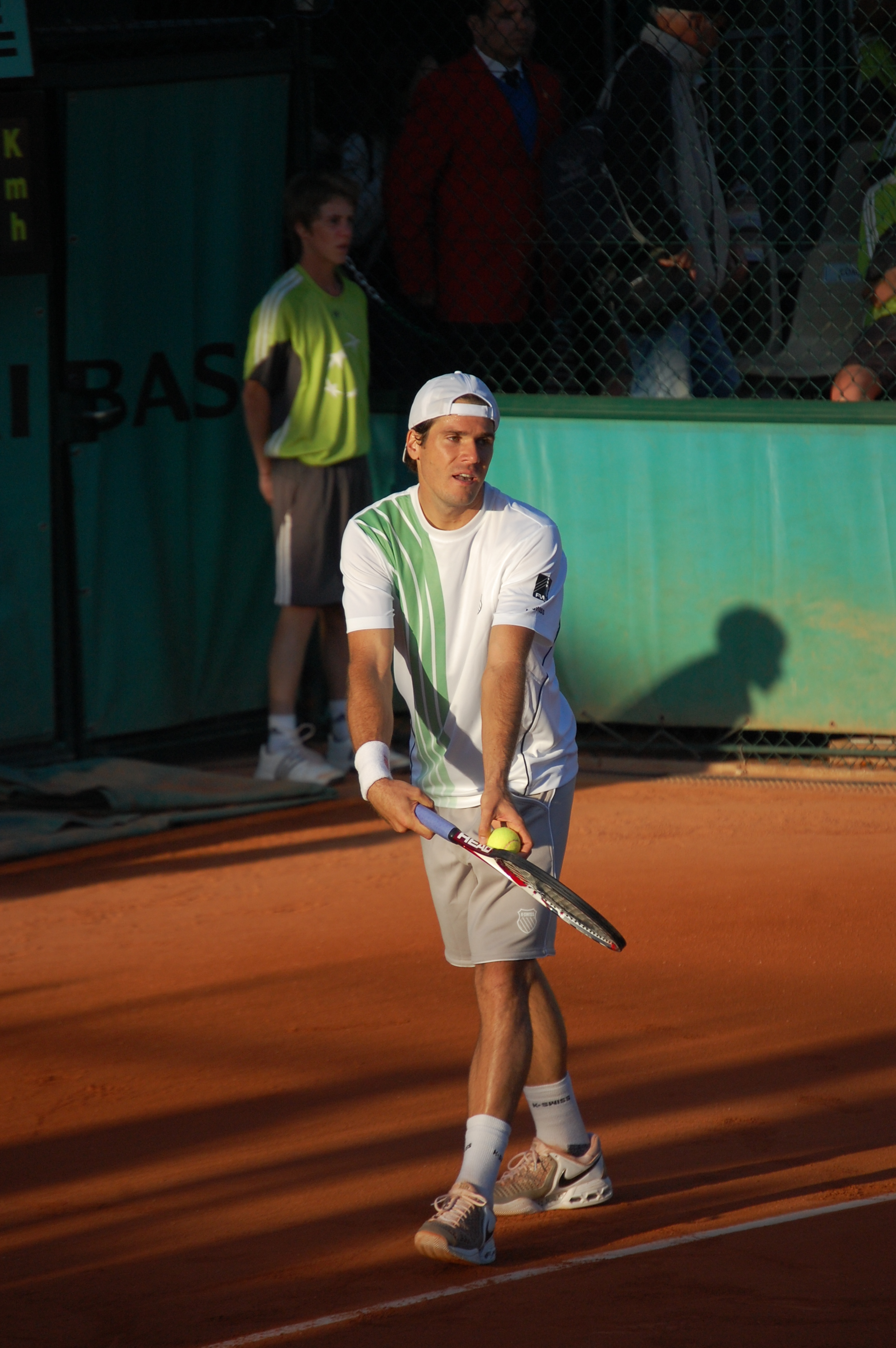
Haas at the 2009 French Open.

He reached the third round at Wimbledon with a four-set win over Guillermo Cañas and a straight-set win over 23rd seed Tommy Robredo. He then fell to Andy Murray in four sets.

In the hard-court season, he got to the semifinals of the Legg Mason Tennis Classic in Washington, D.C., but lost to Juan Martín del Potro. At the Rogers Cup in Toronto, he beat former world No. 1 Carlos Moyà, and then lost to Nikolay Davydenko in the second round. At the US Open, he beat 12th seed Richard Gasquet in five sets. He then fell to Gilles Müller of Luxembourg in five sets, despite cruising in the first two sets.

At the beginning of the new season, Haas pulled out of the Qatar ExxonMobil Open due to elbow problems. However, he appeared in the Kooyong Exhibition game, where he beat Mardy Fish.

At the 2009 Australian Open, Haas beat Eduardo Schwank in the first round and Flavio Cipolla in the second. In the third round, he fell to the tournament's first seed and eventual champion Rafael Nadal.

At the SAP Open in San Jose, California, he joined forces with Czech Radek Štěpánek to clinch his first doubles title, after losing in the singles quarterfinals to defending champion Andy Roddick.

Haas lost in the first round in both Memphis and Delray Beach. He did not succeed in defending his quarterfinal points at the BNP Paribas Open in Indian Wells, as he fell to Novak Djokovic in the third round, after defeating Óscar Hernández and Rainer Schüttler. He suffered another failure in the Miami Masters, losing to Mikhail Kukushkin.

In Houston, Texas, at the River Oaks Men's Clay Championship, Haas was defeated by Björn Phau in the quarterfinals, after he defeated defending champion Marcel Granollers in the second round.

As a qualifier in Madrid, he defeated Ernests Gulbis, before losing to Andy Roddick.

At the French Open, Haas matched his best result since 2002. He defeated Andrei Pavel in straight sets, and then won a five-setter against Leonardo Mayer. After defeating Jérémy Chardy in the third round, Haas was narrowly defeated by the former world No. 1 and eventual champion, Roger Federer, in the fourth round. At a crucial stage in the third set, Haas was only five points away from his biggest win on clay, but was unable to convert a break point that would have seen him serve for the match at 5–3. Federer hit a vital winner to save the break point, en route to a comeback victory.

At the Gerry Weber Open, Haas won his first title on grass in his 21st ATP World Tour final. In the process, he defeated fourth seed Jo-Wilfried Tsonga in the second round, Mischa Zverev in the quarterfinals, and Philipp Kohlschreiber in the semifinals. He defeated the tournament's second seed Novak Djokovic, in the final.

This victory made Haas one of a small group of players to have won ATP titles on all three major surfaces (grass, clay, and hard courts.) With Haas' success at this tournament and at the French Open, his ranking rose to no. 35.

At Wimbledon, Haas won a five-set match against Marin Čilić. Haas was up two sets to love and had match points in the fourth set, then had to save two match points serving at 5–6 before the match was suspended due to darkness after over four hours of play, at 6–6 in the fifth. The next day, Haas broke Cilic at 8–8 and eventually held on to win. Haas then comfortably defeated Igor Andreev to reach the quarterfinals. There, he defeated Novak Djokovic for the second time in three weeks to reach the semifinals at Wimbledon for the first time in his career, where he faced Roger Federer in a rematch of their encounter in Paris. Haas lost, ensuring Federer's historic seventh Wimbledon final. This success at Wimbledon made Haas rise to No. 19 in the rankings.

Haas continued his late career resurgence by making it to the semifinals at the LA Tennis Open, defeating Marat Safin in the quarterfinals, before losing to Sam Querrey. He made it to the third round at the US Open, losing narrowly to Fernando Verdasco, after being up a break in each set.

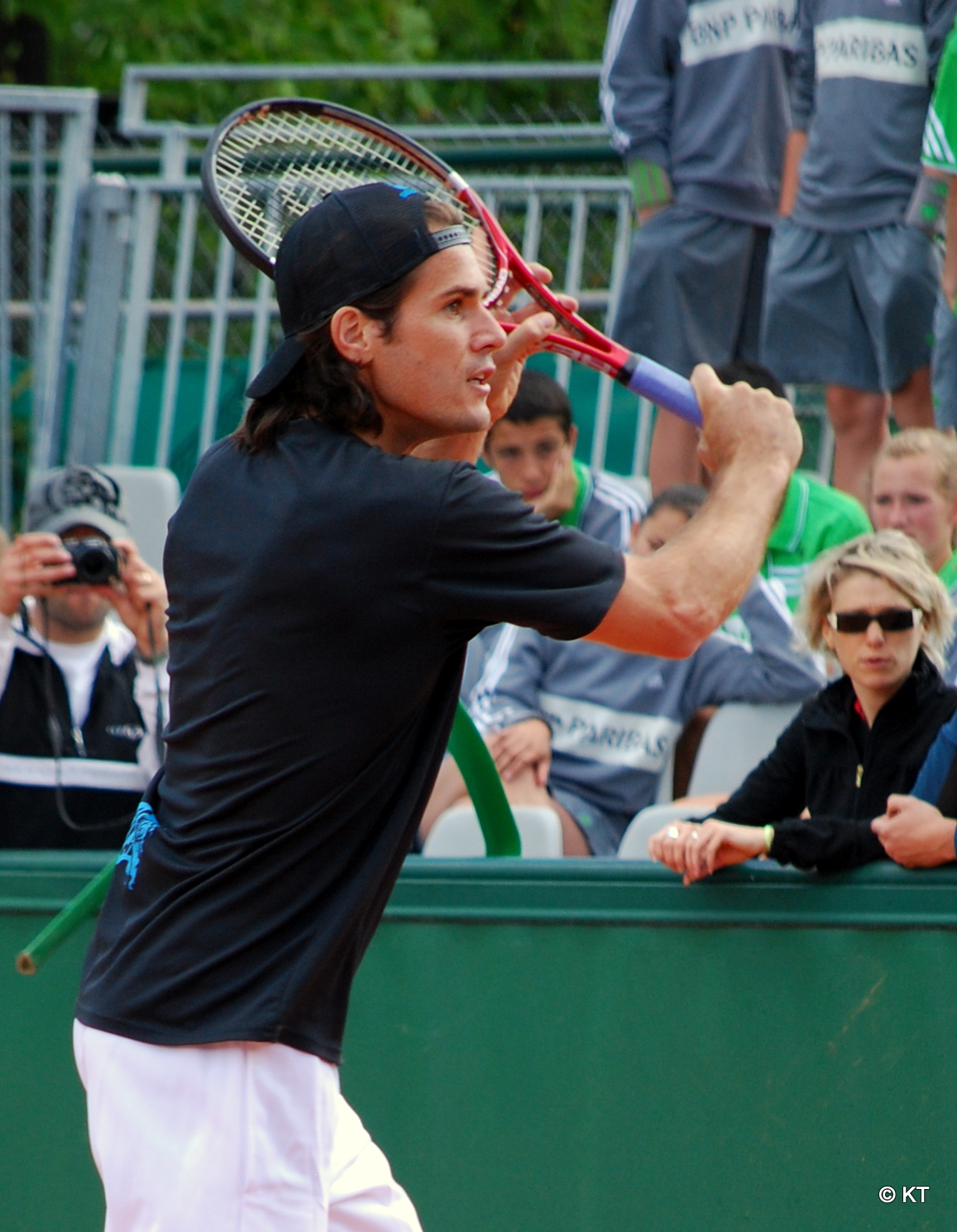
Haas practicing at the 2011 French Open.

=== 2010–2011: Continued injuries and absence ===
Following his comeback, however, Haas suffered from another bout of injury. He made the third round of the 2010 Australian Open, defeating Simon Greul and Janko Tipsarević, but did not play after February 2010, spending time recovering from right hip and right shoulder surgeries. He missed the rest of the 2010 season and once more dropped out of the ATP rankings. He returned to action partnering Radek Štěpánek in doubles in Munich in May 2011, but then lost in the first round. His return match in singles came at the 2011 French Open, where he lost in round one. He also went down in the first round at Wimbledon, but reached the third round of the US Open, losing to Juan Mónaco in four sets. Other than Grand Slams, he played little tennis, competing in only ten other tournaments, mainly in July, August, and October.

=== 2012: 13th title, second ATP Comeback Player of the Year award ===
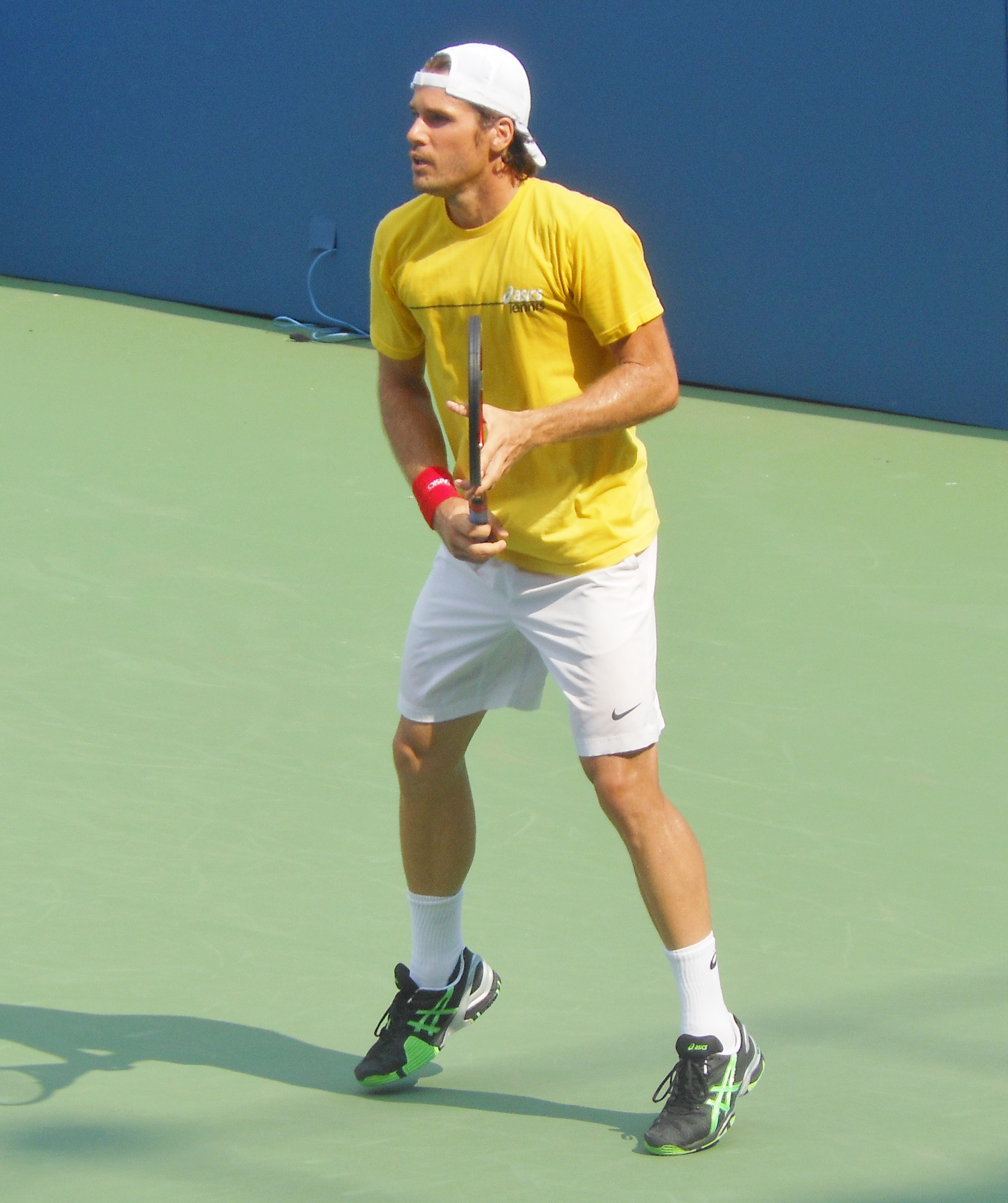
Tommy Haas at the 2012 US Open

Haas began the 2012 season at the Brisbane International, but had to withdraw in the second round. Nevertheless, he competed more regularly in 2012 than in previous seasons. He qualified for the French Open, progressing to the third round, and reached the semifinals of the BMW Open, returning to the world's top 100.

As a wildcard at the Gerry Weber Open in Germany, Haas won the title for the second time thanks to wins over former champions Tomáš Berdych and Philipp Kohlschreiber en route to the final, where he defeated world No. 3 and five-time champion Federer in two sets. However, Haas was subsequently defeated in the first round of Wimbledon later that month, letting a two-sets-to-one lead slip against compatriot Philipp Kohlschreiber.

Haas lost to world No. 206, Pavol Červenák in the Stuttgart clay-court tournament at the second-round stage.

Haas continued to find good form during the second half of the season. He reached the finals of the German Open Tennis Championships 2012, losing to Juan Mónaco, and the Citi Open, losing to Alexandr Dolgopolov. These two runs saw Haas rise back into the top 50. Haas went on to reach two quarterfinals in Masters 1000 tournaments, his best performance at that level since 2008. Haas briefly returned to the top 20 in the world in October 2012, and he finished the season ranked No. 21. This was enough to earn him the Comeback Player of the Year award for a second time.

=== 2013: French Open quarterfinal, victory over No.1, comeback to No.11 ===
Haas lost in the Australian Open first round. In February at the SAP Open he reached his 25th career final against defending champion Milos Raonic, but lost in straight sets. Next he played in Delray Beach International Tennis Championships as a former 2006 champion, where he lost to Ernests Gulbis in three sets in the semifinals.

At Indian Wells, he lost in the fourth round to Juan Martín del Potro after saving match point to beat Nicolás Almagro in the previous round. In Miami, he beat world No. 1, Novak Djokovic, in straight sets. It was his first victory over a top-ranked player since he defeated Andre Agassi in 1999. He followed this up with a victory over Gilles Simon to reach his first Miami semifinal, and first Masters 1000 semifinal since the 2006 Paris Masters. There, he lost to third seed David Ferrer, 6–4, 2–6, 3–6.

In May, he won his first title of the year at Munich, beating Philipp Kohlschreiber in an all-German final.

Haas made history at the French Open, when he missed a record twelve match points against John Isner in the fourth set of their third round match. Isner won the set on a tiebreak, but in the fifth set Haas went on to recover from 2–4 down and saved a match point against him at 4–5 to eventually win 10–8. Haas beat Mikhail Youzhny in the fourth round but eventually lost to Djokovic in straight sets in the quarter finals.

At Wimbledon, Haas advanced to the fourth round to set up a rematch against Djokovic but again lost in straight sets.

=== 2014–2018: Last career final, Indian Wells tournament director, retirement ===
==== 2014 ====
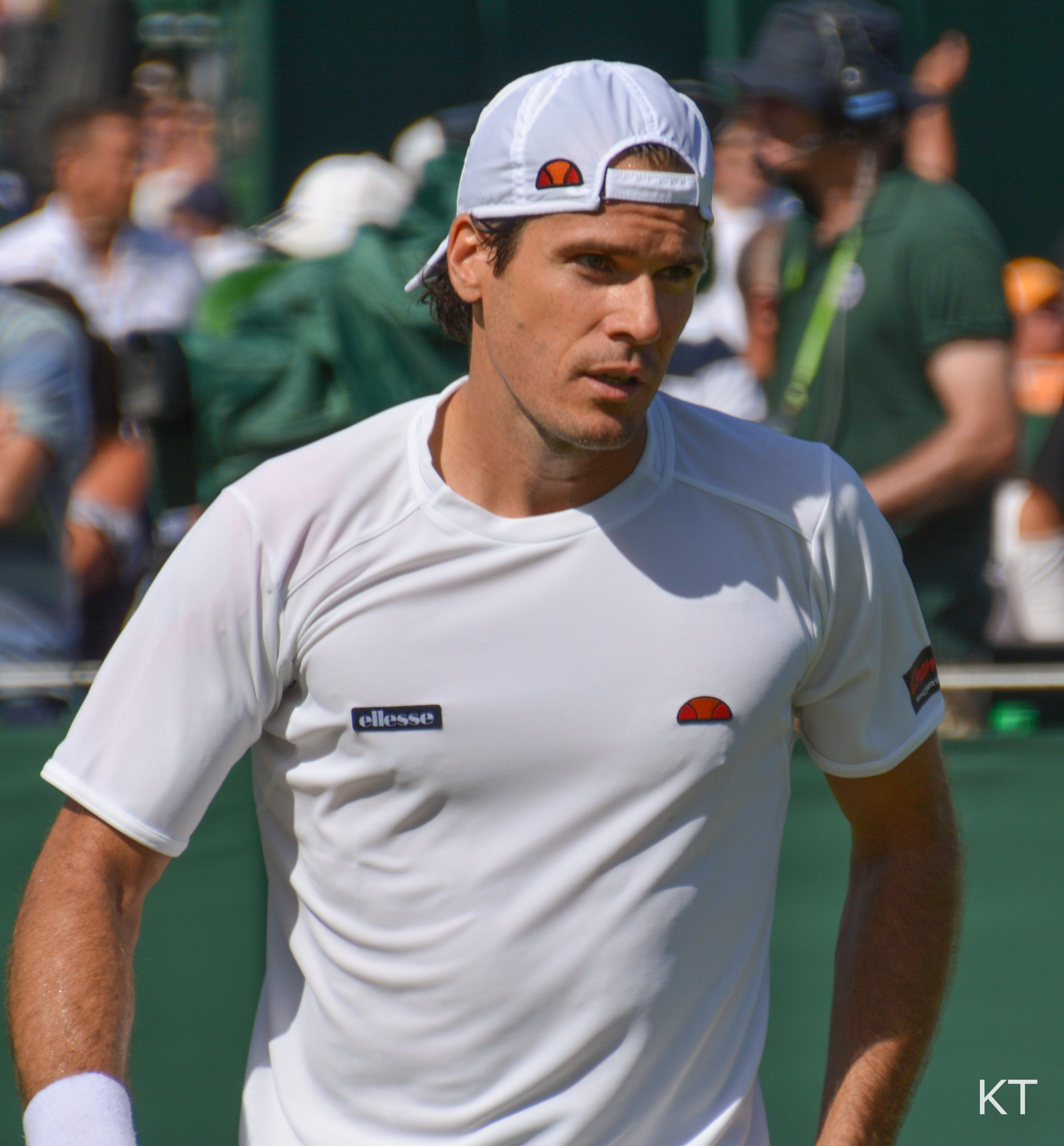
Tommy Haas at Wimbledon in 2015

Haas started the season at the Heineken Open in Auckland, where he lost in the second round against Jack Sock in straight sets. At the Australian Open, he was forced to retire with a recurring shoulder problem against Guillermo García López in the first round after trailing 5–7, 2–5 on serve. After the setback, he participated in the first round of the Davis Cup against Spain. He teamed up alongside Philipp Kohlschreiber in doubles, taking a four-set victory to hand Germany a place in the quarterfinals for the first time since 2011.

Haas then hired compatriot Alexander Waske as his new coach. His goal was to qualify for his first season-end ATP World Tour Finals. In his next tournament, the Zagreb Indoors, Haas reached the final by defeating Benjamin Becker, Andrey Kuznetsov, and Daniel Evans. In the final, he was beaten by defending champion Marin Čilić in straight sets.

At the 2014 BMW Open, Haas was the defending champion. He made it to the semifinals, but lost to Martin Kližan. Haas reached the fourth round of the BNP Paribas Open, where he was defeated by Roger Federer in straight sets. Haas reached the quarterfinals of the Rome Masters after beating third seed Stan Wawrinka. He then retired in the quarterfinals to Grigor Dimitrov.

Haas missed the rest of the 2014 season to have an operation on his injured right shoulder which had forced him to retire from several events.

==== 2015 ====
After a later than expected return from injury, in the grass court season in June 2015, Haas played his comeback match at Stuttgart as a wild card. In the first round he beat Mikhail Kukushkin in straight sets but then lost to Bernard Tomic in straight sets in the second round. Haas then played at the Gerry Weber Open, losing in the first round to eventual finalist Andreas Seppi. His next tournament was Wimbledon, where he reached the second round. After beating Dušan Lajović, he lost to world No. 8 Milos Raonic in four sets.. At the US Open, Haas was defeated by Fernando Verdasco in a five-setter in the first round.

==== 2016 ====
In April 2016, Haas, at 38, had toe surgery and was out for nine months, "I know that there's a chance that I might not come back from this", Haas said. "I know it will be a very, very hard task, but there's no doubt in my mind I'm certainly going to try."

In June 2016, Tommy Haas was named the new Indian Wells Tournament Director. "I'm thrilled to join the BNP Paribas Open as its new Tournament Director and look forward to working with one of the finest sporting events in the world", said Haas. "There is a reason that the BNP Paribas Open has been voted Tournament of the Year by both tours for consecutive years, as the tournament and venue continue to provide a world-class experience for players, fans and sponsors. I look forward to joining the experienced Indian Wells staff, building upon the foundation they have created, and working to take the event to even greater heights."

==== 2017 ====
In January 2017, Haas made his first ATP Tour appearance in 15 months at the Australian Open. In the first round, he retired after the second set because he felt physically "empty".

In April 2017, Haas won his first match at ATP-level in 21 months in Houston. At the age of 39, he defeated the almost 20 years younger Reilly Opelka in the first round. This victory made him the oldest player to win an ATP Tour match since Jimmy Connors in 1995. He then lost to top seed Jack Sock in three sets.

At the Monte-Carlo Masters, Haas beat world No. 40 Benoît Paire in straight sets in the first round. In the second round, he lost to Tomáš Berdych in a close match.

In June, Haas reached the quarterfinals of the MercedesCup in Stuttgart after upsetting Roger Federer in the second round and Pierre-Hugues Herbert in the first round. In the quarterfinals, he lost to sixth seed Mischa Zverev in straight sets.

Haas played his last ATP tournament in Kitzbühel in August 2017, where he lost in the first round to compatriot Jan-Lennard Struff. He was not given a wild card for the US Open and cancelled his participation at the Vienna Open.

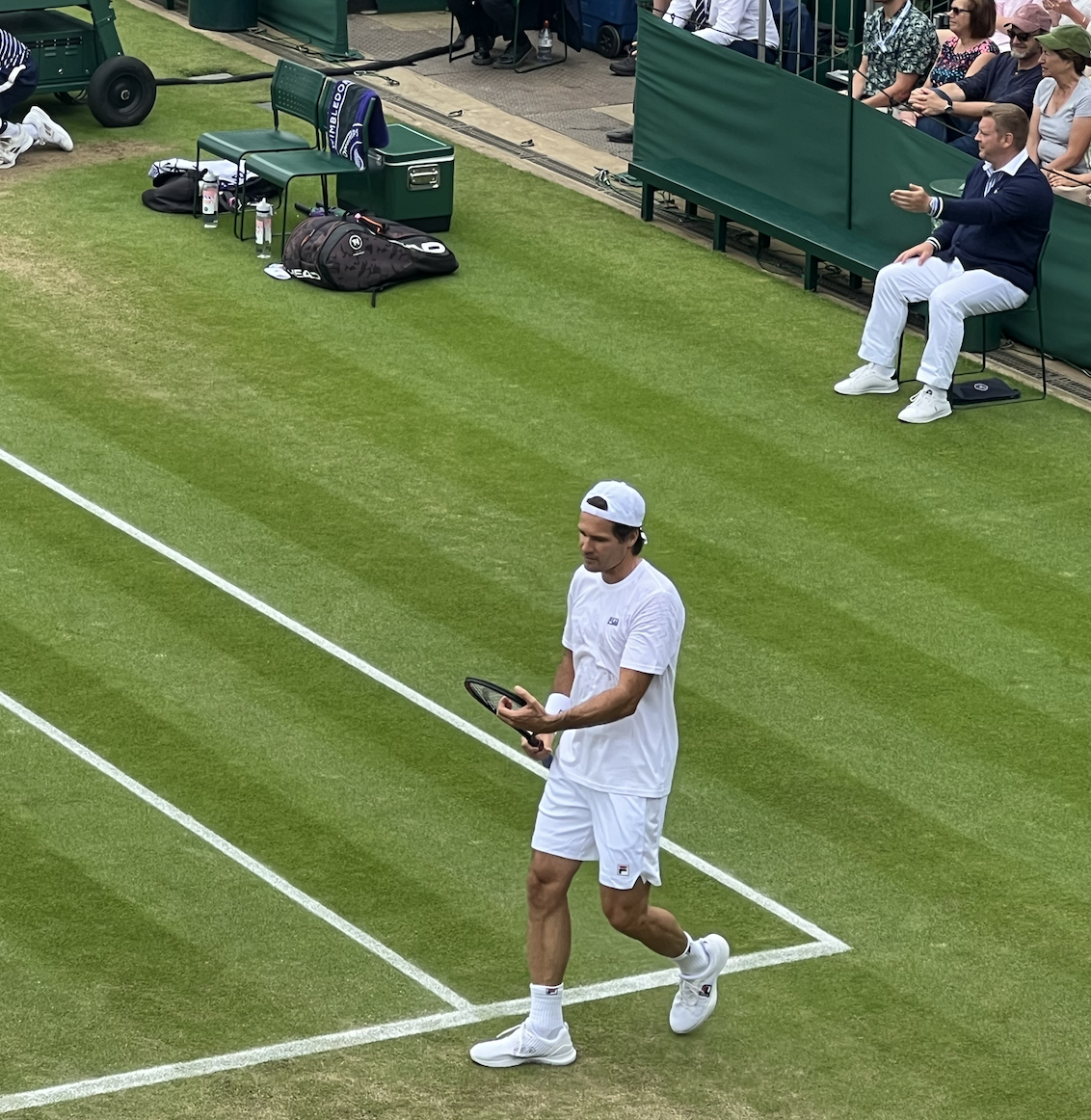
Haas as a retired player in Wimbledon's Invitational Doubles tournament in 2023.

==== 2018 ====
At the 2018 Australian Open, Haas coached Lucas Pouille.

In February, it was assumed that Haas ended his career because of an interview he gave a California newspaper. On 15 March 2018, he officially announced his retirement from the ATP World Tour.

== Performance timelines ==
Key
W	F	SF	QF	#R	RR	Q#	P#	DNQ	A	Z#	PO	G	S	B	NMS	NTI	P	NH

(W) winner; (F) finalist; (SF) semifinalist; (QF) quarterfinalist; (#R) rounds 4, 3, 2, 1; (RR) round-robin stage; (Q#) qualification round; (P#) preliminary round; (DNQ) did not qualify; (A) absent; (Z#) Davis/Fed Cup Zonal Group (with number indication) or (PO) play-off; (G) gold, (S) silver or (B) bronze Olympic/Paralympic medal; (NMS) not a Masters tournament; (NTI) not a Tier I tournament; (P) postponed; (NH) not held; (SR) strike rate (events won / competed); (W–L) win–loss record.

=== Singles ===
Tournament	1996	1997	1998	1999	2000	2001	2002	2003	2004	2005	2006	2007	2008	2009	2010	2011	2012	2013	2014	2015	2016	2017	SR	W–L	Win%
Grand Slam tournaments
Australian Open	A	A	1R	SF	2R	2R	SF	A	A	2R	4R	SF	A	3R	3R	A	2R	1R	1R	A	A	1R	0 / 14	26–14	65%
French Open	A	A	1R	3R	3R	2R	4R	A	1R	3R	3R	A	A	4R	A	1R	3R	QF	1R	A	A	A	0 / 13	21–13	62%
Wimbledon	A	2R	3R	3R	3R	1R	A	A	2R	1R	3R	4R	3R	SF	A	1R	1R	4R	A	2R	A	1R	0 / 16	24–15	62%
US Open	1R	3R	2R	4R	2R	4R	4R	A	QF	3R	QF	QF	2R	3R	A	3R	1R	3R	A	1R	A	A	0 / 17	34–17	67%
Win–loss	0–1	3–2	3–4	12–4	6–4	5–4	11–3	0–0	5–3	5–4	11–4	12–2	3–2	12–4	2–1	2–3	3–4	9–4	0–2	1–2	0–0	0–2	0 / 60	105–59	64%
National representation
Olympics	A	not held			F-S	not held			2R	not held			A	not held			A	not held			A	NH	0 / 2	6–2	75%
Davis Cup	A	A	QF	1R	QF	QF	1R	A	PO	PO	1R	SF	A	A	A	A	1R	A	QF	A	A	A	0 / 9	19–7	73%
Win–loss	0–0	0–0	4–0	3–1	7–1	2–0	1–0	0–0	2–2	2–2	1–2	3–1	0–0	0–0	0–0	0–0	0–0	0–0	0–0	0–0	0–0	0–0	0 / 11	25–9	69%
Year-end championships
Grand Slam Cup	did not qualify			F	not held																		0 / 1	3–1	75%
ATP World Tour Masters 1000
Indian Wells	A	Q1	3R	1R	3R	2R	2R	A	4R	2R	4R	QF	QF	3R	A	A	2R	4R	4R	A	A	A	0 / 14	25–13	66%
Miami	A	3R	2R	2R	3R	4R	3R	A	1R	3R	3R	2R	A	1R	A	A	2R	SF	A	A	A	1R	0 / 14	14–13	52%
Monte Carlo	A	A	A	2R	1R	3R	QF	A	2R	A	A	A	1R	A	A	A	A	A	A	A	A	2R	0 / 7	8–7	53%
Rome	Q2	2R	3R	A	1R	2R	F	A	1R	1R	1R	1R	A	A	A	A	A	1R	QF	A	A	2R	0 / 12	13–12	52%
Hamburg^{1}	Q2	SF	2R	QF	1R	2R	3R	A	2R	1R	1R	A	A	2R	A	A	A	3R	1R	A	A	1R	0 / 13	15–13	54%
Canada	A	2R	3R	3R	A	SF	SF	A	1R	A	2R	3R	2R	2R	A	A	QF	2R	A	A	A	A	0 / 12	21–12	64%
Cincinnati	Q3	2R	3R	3R	A	2R	1R	A	QF	1R	3R	1R	3R	1R	A	1R	2R	3R	A	A	A	A	0 / 14	16–14	53%
Stuttgart^{2}	Q1	1R	2R	3R	1R	W	2R	A	3R	2R	3R	2R	A	2R	A	A	QF	3R	A	1R	A	A	1 / 14	17–12	59%
Paris	Q1	A	3R	QF	2R	SF	3R	A	3R	3R	SF	3R	A	2R	A	A	A	2R	A	A	A	A	0 / 11	15–11	58%
Win–loss	0–0	9–6	13–8	9–8	4–7	20–7	17–9	0–0	11–9	4–7	10–8	6–7	7–3	5–7	0–0	0–1	9–5	14–8	5–3	0–1	0–0	2–4	1 / 111	144–107	57%
Career statistics
	1996	1997	1998	1999	2000	2001	2002	2003	2004	2005	2006	2007	2008	2009	2010	2011	2012	2013	2014	2015	2016	2017	SR	W–L	Win%
Tournaments	3	17	26	24	21	25	22	0	21	21	22	18	15	19	4	12	19	26	11	9	0	14	349		
Titles	0	0	0	1	0	4	0	0	2	0	3	1	0	1	0	0	1	2	0	0	0	0	15		
Finals	0	1	1	4	3	4	1	0	2	0	3	1	0	1	0	0	3	3	1	0	0	0	28		
Hardcourt W–L	4–3	10–8	20–14	25–12	18–9	41–11	26–13	0–0	25–12	16–13	35–11	33–13	15–10	15–13	3–4	6–8	16–11	28–13	7–6	0–5	0–0	0–3	11 / 212	343–192	64%
Clay W–L	0–0	5–3	10–6	13–8	14–8	7–6	18–7	0–0	8–7	11–7	5–6	3–4	0–2	6–3	0–0	0–1	10–4	14–6	7–5	0–0	0–0	4–8	2 / 85	135–91	60%
Grass W–L	0–0	2–2	3–2	7–3	2–2	1–2	0–0	0–0	3–2	3–2	5–2	3–0	3–2	10–1	0–0	1–3	5–1	5–2	0–0	2–4	0–0	2–3	2 / 36	57–33	63%
Carpet W–L	0–0	5–4	8–4	2–3	2–3	8–2	1–1	0–0	1–1	3–2	4–2	0–0	0–0	discontinued									0 / 16	34–22	61%
Overall W–L	4–3	22–17	41–26	47–26	36–22	57–21	45–21	0–0	37–22	33–24	49–21	39–17	18–14	31–17	3–4	7–12	31–16	47–21	14–11	2–9	0–0	6–14	15 / 349	569–338	63%
Win %	57%	56%	61%	64%	62%	73%	68%	–	63%	58%	70%	70%	56%	65%	43%	37%	66%	69%	56%	18%	–	30%	63%		
Year-end ranking	170	45	34	11	23	8	11	–	17	45	11	12	82	18	372	205	21	12	77	470	–	252	$13,609,987		

* 2007 Wimbledon counts as 3 wins, 0 losses. Roger Federer walkover in round 4, after Haas withdrew because of a torn stomach muscle, does not count as a Haas loss.

^{1}Held as Hamburg Masters until 2008, Madrid Masters (outdoor clay) 2009 – present.
^{2}Held as Stuttgart Masters until 2001, Madrid Masters (indoor hard) from 2002 to 2008, and Shanghai Masters 2009 – present.

=== Doubles ===
Tournament	1996	1997	1998	1999	2000	2001	2002	2003	2004	2005	2006	2007	2008	2009	2010	2011	2012	2013	2014	2015	2016	2017	SR	W–L
Grand Slam tournaments
Australian Open	A	A	A	A	A	A	A	A	A	A	A	A	A	A	A	A	A	A	A	A	A	A	0 / 0	0–0
French Open	A	A	A	A	A	A	A	A	A	A	A	A	A	A	A	1R	A	A	A	A	A	A	0 / 1	0–1
Wimbledon	A	A	A	A	A	A	A	A	A	A	A	A	A	A	A	A	A	A	A	A	A	A	0 / 0	0–0
US Open	A	A	A	A	A	A	A	A	A	1R	A	A	A	A	A	A	A	A	A	3R	A	A	0 / 2	2–2
Win–loss	0–0	0–0	0–0	0–0	0–0	0–0	0–0	0–0	0–0	0–1	0–0	0–0	0–0	0–0	0–0	0–1	0–0	0–0	0–0	2–1	0–0	0–0	0 / 3	2–3
National representation
Olympics	A	not held			QF	not held			A	not held			A	not held			A	not held			A	NH	0 / 1	2–1
Davis Cup	A	A	QF	1R	QF	QF	1R	A	PO	PO	1R	SF	A	A	A	A	1R	A	QF	A	A	A	0 / 9	4–2
Win–loss	0–0	0–0	0–0	0–0	2–1	0–0	0–0	0–0	2–0	1–0	0–1	0–0	0–0	0–0	0–0	0–0	0–1	0–0	1–0	0–0	0–0	0–0	0 / 10	6–3
ATP World Tour Masters 1000
Indian Wells	A	A	A	A	A	1R	1R	A	A	A	A	A	A	A	A	A	A	1R	A	A	A	A	0 / 3	0–3
Miami	A	A	A	A	A	2R	1R	A	A	A	A	A	A	A	A	A	A	QF	A	A	A	A	0 / 3	3–3
Monte Carlo	A	A	A	A	A	A	A	A	A	A	A	A	A	A	A	A	A	A	A	A	A	2R	0 / 1	1–1
Rome	Q2	A	A	A	A	A	A	A	A	A	A	A	A	A	A	A	A	A	QF	A	A	1R	0 / 2	2–1
Hamburg^{1}	Q2	1R	1R	A	A	QF	1R	A	A	A	2R	A	A	A	A	A	A	QF	A	A	A	2R	0 / 7	6–6
Canada	A	QF	1R	A	A	A	A	A	A	A	A	A	A	2R	A	A	A	2R	A	A	A	A	0 / 4	4–2
Cincinnati	A	2R	A	A	A	2R	A	A	A	A	A	A	A	A	A	A	A	A	A	A	A	A	0 / 2	2–2
Stuttgart^{2}	A	A	QF	A	A	1R	A	A	1R	A	A	A	A	2R	A	A	A	A	A	A	A	A	0 / 4	3–3
Paris	A	A	A	A	A	A	A	A	A	A	A	A	A	A	A	A	A	A	A	A	A	A	0 / 0	0–0
Win–loss	0–0	3–3	2–3	0–0	0–0	4–5	0–3	0–0	0–1	0–0	1–0	0–0	0–0	2–0	0–0	0–0	0–0	5–3	2–0	0–0	0–0	2–3	0 / 26	21–21
Career statistics
	1996	1997	1998	1999	2000	2001	2002	2003	2004	2005	2006	2007	2008	2009	2010	2011	2012	2013	2014	2015	2016	2017	Career	
Titles / Finals	0 / 0	0 / 0	0 / 0	0 / 0	0 / 0	0 / 0	0 / 0	0 / 0	0 / 0	0 / 0	0 / 0	0 / 0	0 / 0	1 / 1	0 / 0	0 / 0	0 / 0	0 / 0	0 / 0	0 / 0	0 / 0	0 / 0	1 / 1	
Overall W–L	0–1	4–6	5–9	2–3	5–5	12–11	0–7	0–0	5–5	7–3	1–3	0–1	1–1	7–2	1–0	3–3	2–5	10–12	3–2	2–1	0–0	4–6	74–86	
Year-end ranking	973	290	213	689	696	133	729	–	335	397	491	–	677	130	–	408	406	93	287	372	–	268	46.25%	

^{1}Held as Hamburg Masters until 2008, Madrid Masters (outdoor clay) 2009 – present.
^{2}Held as Stuttgart Masters until 2001, Madrid Masters (indoor hard) from 2002 to 2008, and Shanghai Masters 2009 – present.

== Post-retirement activity ==
In July 2020, Haas played the Berlin tennis exhibitions, where he beat Jan-Lennard Struff before he lost to Dominic Thiem.

== Playing style ==
Haas was an all-court player, capable of playing well on clay, hard, and grass surfaces. Nick Bollettieri noted Haas as having "one of the greatest backhands in the world", praising its versatility and power. Haas also possessed a powerful slice backhand, which he used to disrupt the rhythm of the point and to construct offensive positions. He also possessed a strong serve and a functional set of volleys.

Haas was known for his refined footwork and racquet skills, both of which he used to construct quick defensive-to-offensive transitions. He was widely considered one of the best players to have never won a grand slam, having been restricted by numerous injuries. Reviewers described him as having nice "fluidity" and how his game overall allows him to adapt to most situations, as demonstrated by his equal win percentage over both right and left-handed players, as well as his relatively even win percentages on all surfaces. Haas' mental game was described as solid, boasting a positive win record in deciding sets (3rd or 5th).

== Personal life ==
On 27 January 2010, Haas became a United States citizen, but continued to represent Germany in tennis.

In 2006, Haas began dating American actress Sara Foster. They have two daughters, Valentina Evelyn (b. 2010) and Josephine Lena (b. 2015). In August 2024, they announced their separation after 18 years together.

== Significant finals ==
=== Olympic finals ===
==== Singles: 1 (1 silver medal) ====
Result	Year	Tournament	Surface	Opponent	Score
Silver	2000	Sydney Olympics	Hard	(Russia) Yevgeny Kafelnikov	6–7^{(4–7)}, 6–3, 2–6, 6–4, 3–6

=== Grand Slam Cup finals ===
==== Singles: 1 (0–1) ====
Result	Year	Location	Surface	Opponent	Score
Loss	1999	Munich, Germany	Hard (i)	(United Kingdom) Greg Rusedski	3–6, 4–6, 7–6^{(7–5)}, 6–7^{(5–7)}

=== Masters Series finals ===
==== Singles: 2 (1–1) ====
Result	Year	Tournament	Surface	Opponent	Score
Win	2001	Stuttgart Masters	Hard (i)	(Belarus) Max Mirnyi	6–2, 6–2, 6–2
Loss	2002	Rome Masters	Clay	(United States) Andre Agassi	3–6, 3–6, 0–6

== ATP career finals ==
=== Singles: 28 (15–13) ===
Legend Grand Slam tournaments (0–0) Grand Slam Cup (0–1) Olympic Games (0–1) ATP Masters Series / ATP World Tour Masters 1000 (1–1) ATP International Series Gold / ATP World Tour 500 Series (4–4) ATP International Series / ATP World Tour 250 Series (10–6)	Finals by surface Hard (11–9) Clay (2–4) Grass (2–0) Carpet (0–0)

Result	W–L	Date	Tournament	Tier	Surface	Opponent	Score
Loss	0–1	Oct 1997	Open Sud de France, Lyon	International	Hard (i)	(France) Fabrice Santoro	4–6, 4–6
Loss	0–2	Oct 1998	Open Sud de France, Lyon	International	Hard (i)	(Spain) Àlex Corretja	6–2, 6–7^{(6–8)}, 1–6
Loss	0–3	Jan 1999	Auckland Open, New Zealand	International	Hard	(Netherlands) Sjeng Schalken	4–6, 4–6
Win	1–3	Feb 1999	US Indoor Championships, United States	Intl. Gold	Hard (i)	(United States) Jim Courier	6–4, 6–1
Loss	1–4	Jul 1999	Stuttgart Open, Germany	Intl. Gold	Clay	(Sweden) Magnus Norman	7–6^{(8–6)}, 6–4, 6–7^{(7–9)}, 0–6, 3–6
Loss	1–5	Oct 1999	Grand Slam Cup, Germany	GS Cup	Hard (i)	(United Kingdom) Greg Rusedski	3–6, 4–6, 7–6^{(7–5)}, 6–7^{(5–7)}
Loss	1–6	May 2000	Bavarian Championships, Germany	International	Clay	(Argentina) Franco Squillari	4–6, 4–6
Loss	1–7	Sep 2000	Summer Olympics, Sydney	Olympics	Hard	(Russia) Yevgeny Kafelnikov	6–7^{(4–7)}, 6–3, 2–6, 6–4, 3–6
Loss	1–8	Oct 2000	Vienna Open, Austria	Intl. Gold	Hard (i)	(United Kingdom) Tim Henman	4–6, 4–6, 4–6
Win	2–8	Jan 2001	ATP Adelaide, Australia	International	Hard	(Chile) Nicolás Massú	6–3, 6–1
Win	3–8	Aug 2001	ATP Long Island, United States	International	Hard	(United States) Pete Sampras	6–3, 3–6, 6–2
Win	4–8	Oct 2001	Vienna Open, Austria	Intl. Gold	Hard (i)	(Argentina) Guillermo Cañas	6–2, 7–6^{(8–6)}, 6–4
Win	5–8	Oct 2001	Stuttgart Masters, Germany	Masters	Hard (i)	(Belarus) Max Mirnyi	6–2, 6–2, 6–2
Loss	5–9	May 2002	Rome Masters, Italy	Masters	Clay	(United States) Andre Agassi	3–6, 3–6, 0–6
Win	6–9	Apr 2004	US Clay Court Championships, United States	International	Clay	(United States) Andy Roddick	6–3, 6–4
Win	7–9	Jul 2004	Los Angeles Open, United States	International	Hard	(Germany) Nicolas Kiefer	7–6^{(8–6)}, 6–4
Win	8–9	Feb 2006	Delray Beach Open, United States	International	Hard	(Belgium) Xavier Malisse	6–3, 3–6, 7–6^{(7–5)}
Win	9–9	Feb 2006	US Indoor Championships, United States (2)	Intl. Gold	Hard (i)	(Sweden) Robin Söderling	6–3, 6–2
Win	10–9	Jul 2006	Los Angeles Open, United States (2)	International	Hard	(Russia) Dmitry Tursunov	4–6, 7–5, 6–3
Win	11–9	Feb 2007	US Indoor Championships, United States (3)	Intl. Gold	Hard (i)	(United States) Andy Roddick	6–2, 6–3
Win	12–9	Jun 2009	Halle Open, Germany	250 Series	Grass	(Serbia) Novak Djokovic	6–3, 6–7^{(4–7)}, 6–1
Win	13–9	Jun 2012	Halle Open, Germany (2)	250 Series	Grass	(Switzerland) Roger Federer	7–6^{(7–5)}, 6–4
Loss	13–10	Jul 2012	Hamburg European Open, Germany	500 Series	Clay	(Argentina) Juan Mónaco	5–7, 4–6
Loss	13–11	Aug 2012	Washington Open, United States	500 Series	Hard	(Ukraine) Alexandr Dolgopolov	7–6^{(9–7)}, 4–6, 1–6
Loss	13–12	Feb 2013	Pacific Coast Championships, United States	250 Series	Hard (i)	(Canada) Milos Raonic	4–6, 3–6
Win	14–12	May 2013	Bavarian Championships, Germany	250 Series	Clay	(Germany) Philipp Kohlschreiber	6–3, 7–6^{(7–3)}
Win	15–12	Oct 2013	Vienna Open, Austria (2)	250 Series	Hard (i)	(Netherlands) Robin Haase	6–3, 4–6, 6–4
Loss	15–13	Feb 2014	Zagreb Indoors, Croatia	250 Series	Hard (i)	(Croatia) Marin Čilić	3–6, 4–6

=== Doubles: 1 (1–0) ===
Legend
Grand Slam tournaments (0–0)
ATP World Tour Finals (0–0)
ATP World Tour Masters 1000 (0–0)
ATP World Tour 500 Series (0–0)
ATP World Tour 250 Series (1–0)

Result	W–L	Date	Tournament	Tier	Surface	Partner	Opponents	Score
Win	1–0	Feb 2009	Pacific Coast Championships, United States	250 Series	Hard (i)	(Czech Republic) Radek Štěpánek	(India) Rohan Bopanna (Finland) Jarkko Nieminen	6–2, 6–3

=== Team competition: 2 (2–0) ===
Result	W–L	Year	Tournament	Surface	Partners	Opponents	Score
Win	1–0	1998	World Team Cup, Germany	Clay	(Germany) Nicolas Kiefer (Germany) Boris Becker (Germany) David Prinosil	(Czech Republic) Petr Korda (Czech Republic) Ctislav Doseděl (Czech Republic) Daniel Vacek (Czech Republic) Cyril Suk	3–0
Win	2–0	2005	World Team Cup, Germany	Clay	(Germany) Nicolas Kiefer (Germany) Florian Mayer (Germany) Alexander Waske	(Argentina) Guillermo Cañas (Argentina) Juan Ignacio Chela (Argentina) Guillermo Coria (Argentina) Gastón Gaudio	2–1

== ATP Challenger finals ==
=== Singles: 3 (0–3) ===
Result	W–L	Date	Tournament	Surface	Opponent	Score
Loss	0–1	Jun 1996	Weiden, Germany	Clay	(Sweden) Tomas Nydahl	2–6, 6–3, 6–7
Loss	0–2	Dec 1996	Daytona Beach, United States	Hard	(Russia) Andrei Cherkasov	6–7, 6–3, 5–7
Loss	0–3	Apr 1997	Birmingham, United States	Clay	(Belgium) Johan Van Herck	6–7, 7–6, 4–6

== Record against other players ==
=== Record against top-10 players ===
Haas' record against players who have been ranked world No. 10 or higher.

Player	Years	Matches	Record	Win %	Hard	Clay	Grass	Carpet
Number 1 ranked players								
(United States) Jim Courier	1998–1999	2	2–0	100%	2–0	–	–	–
(Russia) Marat Safin	1999–2009	7	5–2	71%	2–1	1–1	–	2–0
(Spain) Carlos Moyá	1997–2008	11	6–5	55%	1–1	5–3	–	0–1
(United States) Andy Roddick	2001–2011	13	7–6	54%	3–5	4–1	–	–
(Chile) Marcelo Ríos	1997–2002	7	3–4	43%	1–3	1–1	–	1–0
(United States) Andre Agassi	1998–2006	10	4–6	40%	3–4	0–1	1–0	0–1
(Spain) Juan Carlos Ferrero	1999–2009	5	2–3	40%	1–0	0–3	1–0	–
(United States) Pete Sampras	1996–2002	8	3–5	38%	2–5	1–0	–	–
(Australia) Lleyton Hewitt	1999–2013	11	4–7	36%	3–5	1–2	–	–
(Serbia) Novak Djokovic	2006–2013	9	3–6	33%	1–3	0–2	2–1	–
(United Kingdom) Andy Murray	2007–2008	3	1–2	33%	1–1	–	0–1	–
(Russia) Yevgeny Kafelnikov	1997–2002	7	2–5	29%	0–3	1–0	–	1–2
(Switzerland) Roger Federer	2000–2017	17	4–13	24%	2–6	0–1	2–4	0–2
(Brazil) Gustavo Kuerten	1998–2001	6	1–5	17%	1–3	0–2	–	–
(Australia) Patrick Rafter	1999	1	0–1	0%	–	–	0–1	–
(Austria) Thomas Muster	1997–1998	2	0–2	0%	0–1	0–1	–	–
(Spain) Rafael Nadal	2006–2012	5	0–5	0%	0–5	–	–	–
Number 2 ranked players								
(Spain) Àlex Corretja	2000–2003	6	4–2	67%	2–0	1–1	–	1–1
(Sweden) Magnus Norman	1999–2002	3	2–1	67%	1–0	1–1	–	–
(Germany) Michael Stich	1996	1	0–1	0%	0–1	–	–	–
(United States) Michael Chang	1998–2002	2	0–2	0%	0–2	–	–	–
(Czech Republic) Petr Korda	1997–1998	2	0–2	0%	0–2	–	–	–
Number 3 ranked players								
(Argentina) David Nalbandian	2002–2012	5	5–0	100%	3–0	1–0	–	1–0
(Switzerland) Stan Wawrinka	2006–2014	2	2–0	100%	1–0	1–0	–	–
(Spain) Sergi Bruguera	1998	1	1–0	100%	–	1–0	–	–
(Croatia) Ivan Ljubičić	2000–2007	5	3–2	60%	2–1	–	0–1	1–0
(Croatia) Marin Čilić	2009–2014	4	2–2	50%	0–1	1–1	1–0	–
(Bulgaria) Grigor Dimitrov	2011–2014	3	1–2	33%	1–1	0–1	–	–
(Russia) Nikolay Davydenko	2005–2008	5	1–4	20%	1–3	0–1	–	–
(Canada) Milos Raonic	2013–2017	3	0–3	0%	0–1	0–1	0–1	–
(Spain) David Ferrer	2005–2013	4	0–4	0%	0–2	0–1	–	0–1
(Argentina) Juan Martín del Potro	2008–2013	5	0–5	0%	0–5	–	–	–
Number 4 ranked players								
(Sweden) Jonas Björkman	1998–2001	2	2–0	100%	2–0	–	–	–
(France) Guy Forget	1997	1	1–0	100%	1–0	–	–	–
(Japan) Kei Nishikori	2014	1	1–0	100%	1–0	–	–	–
(Sweden) Thomas Enqvist	1997–2004	11	9–2	82%	5–1	2–1	–	2–0
(United States) Todd Martin	1999–2002	4	3–1	75%	3–1	–	–	–
(Sweden) Robin Söderling	2004–2006	4	3–1	75%	2–0	0–1	1–0	–
(United Kingdom) Tim Henman	1997–2006	5	3–2	60%	2–1	1–0	–	0–1
(Netherlands) Richard Krajicek	1998–1999	2	1–1	50%	–	–	1–1	–
(Ukraine) Andrei Medvedev	2001	2	1–1	50%	0–1	1–0	–	–
(France) Sébastien Grosjean	1999–2007	9	4–5	44%	3–1	1–2	–	0–2
(Czech Republic) Tomáš Berdych	2004–2017	5	2–3	40%	1–0	0–2	1–1	–
(United States) James Blake	2002–2007	5	2–3	40%	1–3	–	–	1–0
(Germany) Nicolas Kiefer	1998–2005	5	2–3	40%	1–1	0–2	1–0	–
(United Kingdom) Greg Rusedski	1998–2002	5	1–4	20%	0–4	1–0	–	–
Number 5 ranked players								
(Argentina) Gastón Gaudio	2005	1	1–0	100%	–	1–0	–	–
(Czech Republic) Jiří Novák	2000–2005	6	4–2	67%	3–0	0–1	1–1	–
(Spain) Tommy Robredo	2001–2013	6	4–2	67%	2–0	1–2	1–0	–
(France) Jo-Wilfried Tsonga	2009–2015	4	2–2	50%	0–2	1–0	1–0	–
(France) Cédric Pioline	1999–2000	2	1–1	50%	1–1	–	–	–
(Germany) Rainer Schüttler	2000–2009	9	4–5	44%	3–3	1–2	–	–
(South Africa) Kevin Anderson	2011–2015	3	1–2	33%	1–2	–	–	–
(Chile) Fernando González	2004–2009	5	1–4	20%	1–3	0–1	–	–
Number 6 ranked players								
(South Africa) Wayne Ferreira	1998–2005	5	5–0	100%	4–0	–	–	1–0
(France) Gilles Simon	2006–2013	6	5–1	83%	3–1	1–0	1–0	–
(France) Gaël Monfils	2006–2013	4	2–2	50%	1–1	0–1	1–0	–
(Spain) Albert Costa	1997–2004	5	2–3	40%	2–2	0–1	–	–
(Slovakia) Karol Kučera	1997–2002	3	1–2	33%	1–0	–	–	0–2
(Ecuador) Nicolás Lapentti	1999	2	0–2	0%	0–1	–	–	0–1
Number 7 ranked players								
(Spain) Alberto Berasategui	1997–1999	3	3–0	100%	–	3–0	–	–
(Belgium) David Goffin	2013	1	1–0	100%	1–0	–	–	–
(Switzerland) Jakob Hlasek	1996	1	1–0	100%	–	–	–	1–0
(Sweden) Thomas Johansson	2001	1	1–0	100%	–	–	–	1–0
(United States) Mardy Fish	2000–2012	5	4–1	80%	4–0	0–1	–	–
(Spain) Fernando Verdasco	2006–2015	5	3–2	60%	3–2	–	–	–
(Croatia) Mario Ančić	2004–2007	4	2–2	50%	2–2	–	–	–
(France) Richard Gasquet	2006–2012	4	2–2	50%	2–1	0–1	–	–
Number 8 ranked players								
(Serbia) Janko Tipsarević	2005–2012	4	3–1	75%	3–0	–	0–1	–
(Czech Republic) Radek Štěpánek	2007–2013	7	4–3	57%	3–2	0–1	1–0	–
(United States) John Isner	2007–2013	6	3–3	50%	2–3	1–0	–	–
(Cyprus) Marcos Baghdatis	2005–2012	2	1–1	50%	–	1–0	–	0–1
(Russia) Mikhail Youzhny	2002–2013	9	4–5	44%	3–3	1–2	–	–
(Argentina) Guillermo Cañas	2001–2008	6	2–4	33%	1–3	–	1–0	0–1
(Austria) Jürgen Melzer	2002–2005	3	1–2	33%	0–1	0–1	1–0	–
(United States) Jack Sock	2013–2017	3	1–2	33%	0–1	1–1	–	–
(Australia) Mark Philippoussis	1997–2001	4	1–3	25%	1–3	–	–	–
Number 9 ranked players								
(Spain) Nicolás Almagro	2005–2013	3	3–0	100%	2–0	1–0	–	–
(Chile) Nicolás Massú	2001	2	2–0	100%	2–0	–	–	–
(Sweden) Joachim Johansson	2005	1	1–0	100%	–	1–0	–	–
(Argentina) Mariano Puerta	1999	1	1–0	100%	1–0	–	–	–
(Thailand) Paradorn Srichaphan	2004	1	1–0	100%	1–0	–	–	–
(Switzerland) Marc Rosset	1998–2002	5	2–3	40%	1–1	1–1	0–1	–
(Italy) Fabio Fognini	2013	2	0–2	0%	–	0–2	–	–
Number 10 ranked players								
(Spain) Carlos Costa	1998	1	1–0	100%	–	–	–	1–0
(France) Arnaud Clément	1998–2009	7	6–1	86%	4–1	–	–	2–0
(Latvia) Ernests Gulbis	2009–2013	6	4–2	67%	0–2	3–0	1–0	–
(Sweden) Magnus Gustafsson	1997–2001	6	3–3	50%	1–1	1–1	–	1–1
(Spain) Félix Mantilla	1997–2001	4	2–2	50%	1–1	1–1	–	–
(Sweden) Magnus Larsson	1998	2	1–1	50%	1–1	–	–	–
(Argentina) Juan Mónaco	2007–2012	5	1–4	20%	1–3	0–1	–	–
(Spain) Pablo Carreño Busta	2015	1	0–1	0%	0–1	–	–	–
Total	1996–2017	412	201–211	49%	118–126	46–54	20–14	17–17

=== Record against No. 11–20 players ===
Haas' record against players who have been ranked world No. 11–20.

- (United States) Vincent Spadea 9–2
- (Belgium) Xavier Malisse 9–4
- (Belarus) Max Mirnyi 8–1
- (Romania) Andrei Pavel 8–4
- (Slovakia) Dominik Hrbatý 8–6
- (France) Fabrice Santoro 6–3
- (Germany) Florian Mayer 5–0
- (Russia) Dmitry Tursunov 5–1
- (Netherlands) Sjeng Schalken 4–1
- (United States) Robby Ginepri 4–2
- (United States) Sam Querrey 4–2
- (Italy) Andreas Seppi 4–2
- (Spain) Feliciano López 3–0
- (Spain) Marcel Granollers 3–1
- (Finland) Jarkko Nieminen 3–1
- (Germany) Philipp Kohlschreiber 3–4
- (Austria) Stefan Koubek 2–0
- (Australia) Jason Stoltenberg 2–0
- (Russia) Igor Andreev 2–1
- (Argentina) Juan Ignacio Chela 2–2
- (Croatia) Ivo Karlović 2–4
- (France) Arnaud Boetsch 1–0
- (Italy) Renzo Furlan 1–0
- (United States) Jan-Michael Gambill 1–0
- (United States) Reilly Opelka 1–0
- (Spain) Albert Portas 1–0
- (Spain) Francisco Clavet 1–1
- (Ukraine) Alexandr Dolgopolov 1–1
- (France) Nicolas Escudé 1–1
- (Italy) Andrea Gaudenzi 1–1
- (France) Benoît Paire 1–1
- (Australia) Mark Woodforde 1–1
- (France) Paul-Henri Mathieu 1–2
- (Australia) Bernard Tomic 1–3
- (Georgia (country)) Nikoloz Basilashvili 0–1
- (Morocco) Younes El Aynaoui 0–1
- (Poland) Jerzy Janowicz 0–1
- (France) Adrian Mannarino 0–1
- (Netherlands) Jan Siemerink 0–1
- (Argentina) Franco Squillari 0–2

== Wins over top 10 players ==
Haas has a 48–86 record against players who were, at the time the match was played, ranked in the top 10.

Season	1996	1997	1998	1999	2000	2001	2002	2003	2004	2005	2006	2007	2008	2009	2010	2011	2012	2013	2014	2015	2016	2017	Total
Wins	0	2	3	4	6	6	2	0	3	1	3	7	1	3	0	0	4	1	1	0	0	1	48

#	Player	Rank	Event	Surface	Rd	Score	Haas Rank
1997
1.	(Spain) Carlos Moyá	9	Hamburg, Germany	Clay	2R	6–4, 6–1	126
2.	(Russia) Yevgeny Kafelnikov	7	Lyon, France	Carpet (i)	SF	4–6, 6–4, 6–3	67
1998
3.	(Sweden) Jonas Björkman	9	Davis Cup, Hamburg, Germany	Hard	RR	6–3, 7–6^{(7–4)}, 7–5	39
4.	(Chile) Marcelo Ríos	2	Lyon, France	Carpet (i)	SF	6–2, 1–0 ret.	53
5.	(Spain) Àlex Corretja	6	Paris, France	Carpet (i)	2R	7–6^{(7–2)}, 2–6, 6–3	38
1999
6.	(United Kingdom) Tim Henman	7	World Team Cup, Düsseldorf, Germany	Clay	RR	6–7^{(4–7)}, 7–6^{(9–7)}, 6–3	19
7.	(Netherlands) Richard Krajicek	5	's-Hertogenbosch, Netherlands	Grass	QF	7–6^{(7–3)}, 1–6, 6–4	17
8.	(Spain) Carlos Moyá	9	Stuttgart, Germany	Clay	QF	7–6^{(7–3)}, 6–2	16
9.	(United States) Andre Agassi	1	Grand Slam Cup, Munich, Germany	Hard (i)	QF	6–0, 6–7^{(2–7)}, 6–4	11
2000
10.	(Brazil) Gustavo Kuerten	6	Indian Wells, United States	Hard	2R	7–6^{(7–4)}, 7–6^{(7–1)}	22
11.	(Sweden) Thomas Enqvist	9	Munich, Germany	Clay	SF	7–6^{(7–5)}, 1–6, 6–4	19
12.	(Sweden) Thomas Enqvist	7	World Team Cup, Düsseldorf	Clay	RR	5–7, 6–2, 6–2	20
13.	(United States) Pete Sampras	2	World Team Cup, Düsseldorf	Clay	RR	7–5, 6–2	20
14.	(Spain) Àlex Corretja	9	Olympics, Sydney, Australia	Hard	3R	7–6^{(9–7)}, 6–3	48
15.	(Spain) Àlex Corretja	9	Vienna, Austria	Hard (i)	1R	6–1, 6–0	28
2001
16.	(Australia) Lleyton Hewitt	7	Adelaide, Australia	Hard	QF	6–4, 0–6, 6–1	23
17.	(Sweden) Magnus Norman	9	World Team Cup, Düsseldorf, Germany	Clay	RR	6–7^{(3–7)}, 7–6^{(7–3)}, 6–4	23
18.	(Australia) Lleyton Hewitt	6	World Team Cup, Düsseldorf, Germany	Clay	RR	7–6^{(7–5)}, 3–6, 6–3	23
19.	(United States) Pete Sampras	10	Long Island, United States	Hard	F	6–3, 3–6, 6–2	16
20.	(United Kingdom) Tim Henman	9	Stuttgart, Germany	Hard (i)	QF	2–6, 6–3, 6–4	14
21.	(Australia) Lleyton Hewitt	3	Stuttgart, Germany	Hard (i)	SF	2–6, 6–3, 6–4	14
2002
22.	(France) Sébastien Grosjean	10	Rome, Italy	Clay	3R	6–3, 6–4	7
23.	(Russia) Yevgeny Kafelnikov	5	World Team Cup, Düsseldorf, Germany	Clay	RR	7–6^{(7–5)}, 6–3	3
2004
24.	(United States) Andy Roddick	2	Houston, United States	Clay	F	6–3, 6–4	349
25.	(United States) Andre Agassi	10	Los Angeles, United States	Hard	QF	7–6^{(7–5)}, 6–7^{(6–8)}, 6–3	91
26.	(Germany) Rainer Schüttler	8	Cincinnati, United States	Hard	1R	6–3, 1–6, 6–4	67
2005
27.	(Argentina) Gastón Gaudio	6	World Team Cup, Düsseldorf, Germany	Clay	F	6–4, 6–3	22
2006
28.	(United States) Andre Agassi	9	Indian Wells, United States	Hard	3R	7–5, 6–2	28
29.	(United States) Andy Roddick	4	Houston, United States	Clay	QF	6–7^{(1–7)}, 6–4, 6–4	27
30.	(United States) James Blake	9	Paris, France	Carpet (i)	2R	6–4, 6–2	13
2007
31.	(Argentina) David Nalbandian	8	Australian Open, Melbourne, Australia	Hard	4R	4–6, 6–3, 6–2, 6–3	12
32.	(Russia) Nikolay Davydenko	3	Australian Open, Melbourne, Australia	Hard	QF	6–3, 2–6, 1–6, 6–1, 7–5	12
33.	(Croatia) Mario Ančić	9	Davis Cup, Krefeld, Germany	Hard (i)	RR	2–6, 6–4, 6–4, 6–4	10
34.	(Croatia) Ivan Ljubičić	8	Davis Cup, Krefeld, Germany	Hard (i)	RR	6–2, 7–6^{(9–7)}, 6–4	10
35.	(United States) Andy Roddick	4	Memphis, United States	Hard (i)	F	6–3, 6–2	9
36.	(Chile) Fernando González	5	Indian Wells, United States	Hard	4R	6–3, 6–2	9
37.	(United States) James Blake	6	US Open, New York, United States	Hard	4R	4–6, 6–4, 3–6, 6–0, 7–6^{(7–4)}	10
2008
38.	(United States) Andy Roddick	6	Indian Wells, United States	Hard	2R	6–4, 6–4	36
2009
39.	(France) Jo-Wilfried Tsonga	9	Halle, Germany	Grass	2R	6–3, 7–6^{(7–3)}	41
40.	(Serbia) Novak Djokovic	4	Halle, Germany	Grass	F	6–3, 6–7^{(4–7)}, 6–1	41
41.	(Serbia) Novak Djokovic	4	Wimbledon, London, United Kingdom	Grass	QF	7–5, 7–6^{(8–6)}, 4–6, 6–3	34
2012
42.	(France) Jo-Wilfried Tsonga	5	Munich, Germany	Clay	2R	6–1, 6–4	134
43.	(Czech Republic) Tomáš Berdych	7	Halle, Germany	Grass	QF	6–4, 3–6, 7–5	87
44.	(Switzerland) Roger Federer	3	Halle, Germany	Grass	F	7–6^{(7–5)}, 6–4	87
45.	(Serbia) Janko Tipsarević	9	Shanghai, China	Hard	3R	6–2, 6–1	21
2013
46.	(Serbia) Novak Djokovic	1	Miami, United States	Hard	4R	6–2, 6–4	18
2014
47.	(Switzerland) Stanislas Wawrinka	3	Rome, Italy	Clay	3R	5–7, 6–2, 6–3	19
2017
48.	(Switzerland) Roger Federer	5	Stuttgart, Germany	Grass	2R	2–6, 7–6^{(10–8)}, 6–4	302

== German tournaments ==
Tournament	1997	1998	1999	2000	2001	2002	2003	2004	2005	2006	2007	2008	2009	2010	2011	2012	2013	2014	2015	2016	2017	SR	W–L
Halle	2R	2R	QF	1R	2R	A	A	QF	SF	SF	A	2R	W	A	1R	W	SF	A	1R	A	1R	2 / 15	26–13
Munich	A	1R	2R	F	A	QF	A	2R	SF	1R	1R	A	A	A	A	SF	W	SF	A	A	2R	1 / 12	21–11
Hamburg	SF	2R	QF	1R	2R	3R	A	2R	1R	1R	A	A	A	A	A	F	QF	A	A	A	1R	0 / 12	18–12
Stuttgart Open	A	2R	F	2R	A	A	A	A	A	A	A	A	A	A	A	2R	QF	A	2R	A	QF	0 / 7	10–7
Stuttgart Masters	1R	2R	3R	1R	W	discontinued																1 / 5	7–4
Grand Slam Cup	DNQ		F	discontinued																		0 / 1	3–1
Düsseldorf	not held																QF	A	discontinued			0 / 1	1–0

== ATP ranking ==
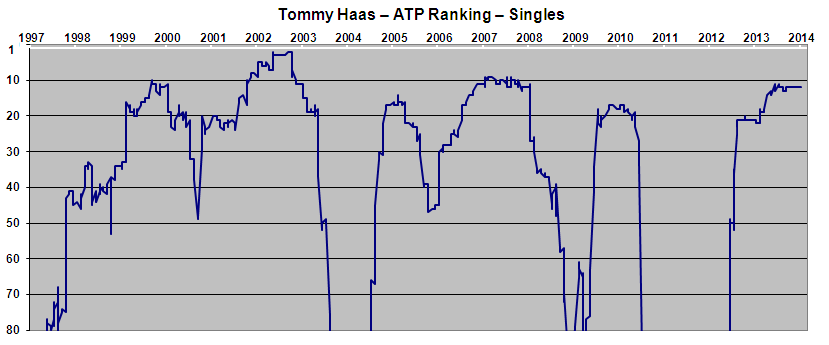
ATP rankings (singles)

Awards
Preceded by (Australia) Mark Philippoussis (Argentina) Juan Martín del Potro	ATP Comeback Player of the Year; 2004; 2012	Succeeded by (United States) James Blake (Spain) Rafael Nadal
