= Halle (Westfalen) =

- Town
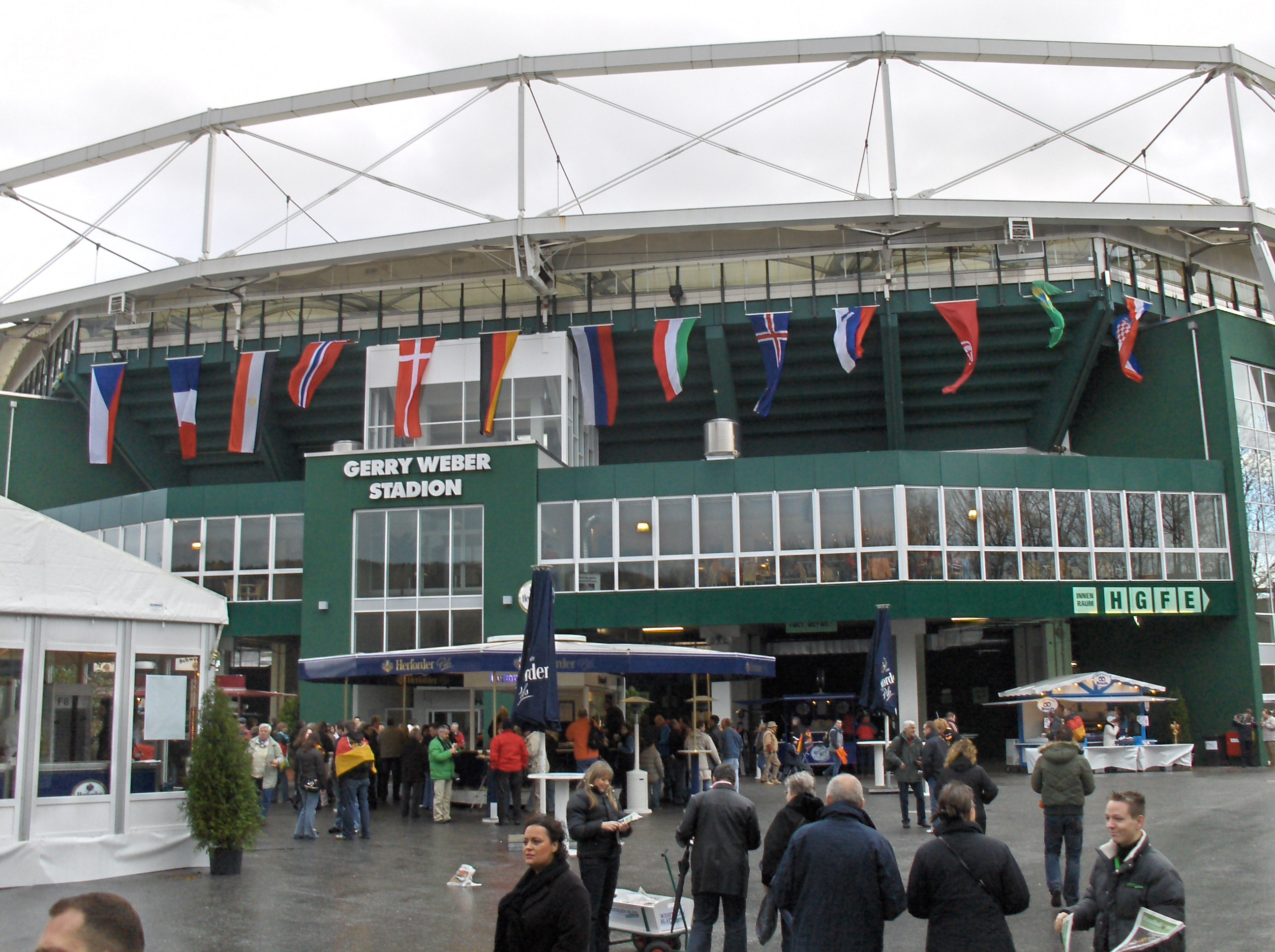
- The Gerry Weber Stadion during the Men's Handball World Cup 2007 in Halle (Westphalia)

- Flag Coat of arms

- Location of Halle within Gütersloh district
- Interactive map of Halle
- Location within Germany Location within North Rhine-Westphalia
- Coordinates: 52°04′N 8°22′E
- Country: Germany
- State: North Rhine-Westphalia
- Admin. region: Detmold
- District: Gütersloh
- Subdivisions: 6

Government
  - Mayor (2020–25): Thomas Tappe (CDU)

Area
  - Total: 69.7 km^{2} (26.9 sq mi)
- Elevation: 125 m (410 ft)

Population (2025-12-31)
  - Total: 21,366
  - Density: 307/km^{2} (794/sq mi)
- Time zone: UTC+01:00 (CET)
  - Summer (DST): UTC+02:00 (CEST)
- Postal codes: 33790
- Dialling codes: 0 52 01
- Vehicle registration: GT (HW until 31 Dec 1972)
- Website: www.hallewestfalen.org

Halle (German pronunciation: [ˈhalə]), officially Halle (Westf.) or Halle Westfalen (i.e. Westphalia) to distinguish it from the larger Halle (Saale), is a town in the German state of North Rhine-Westphalia, 15 km west of Bielefeld. It belongs to the district of Gütersloh in the region of Detmold.

== Geography ==
=== Location ===
Halle is situated on the sandy plain of the river Ems on the southern slopes of the Teutoburg Forest, which crosses the town territory from northwest to southeast. This mountain range delimits the eastern part of the Münsterland and the Westphalian Basin and is the drainage divide between the rivers Ems and Weser here. The highest points are the Hengeberg (316 m) and the Eggeberg (312 m). The lowest point, at 70 m, is at the south-western outskirts of the borough. There three streams, the Hessel, Rhedaer Bach and Ruthebach, leave the town's territory, while the Ruthebach joins the Lodenbach. All of the streams have their source in the Teutoburg Forest and ultimately join the River Ems. The territory of Halle is essentially characterized by agriculture, but has also a substantial amount of forest areas, namely the Teutoburg Forest and the Tatenhausen Forest as well as 40 hectares (99 acres) of municipal forest. The 52nd line of latitude crosses the southern part of the town area in its southern part.

=== Geology ===
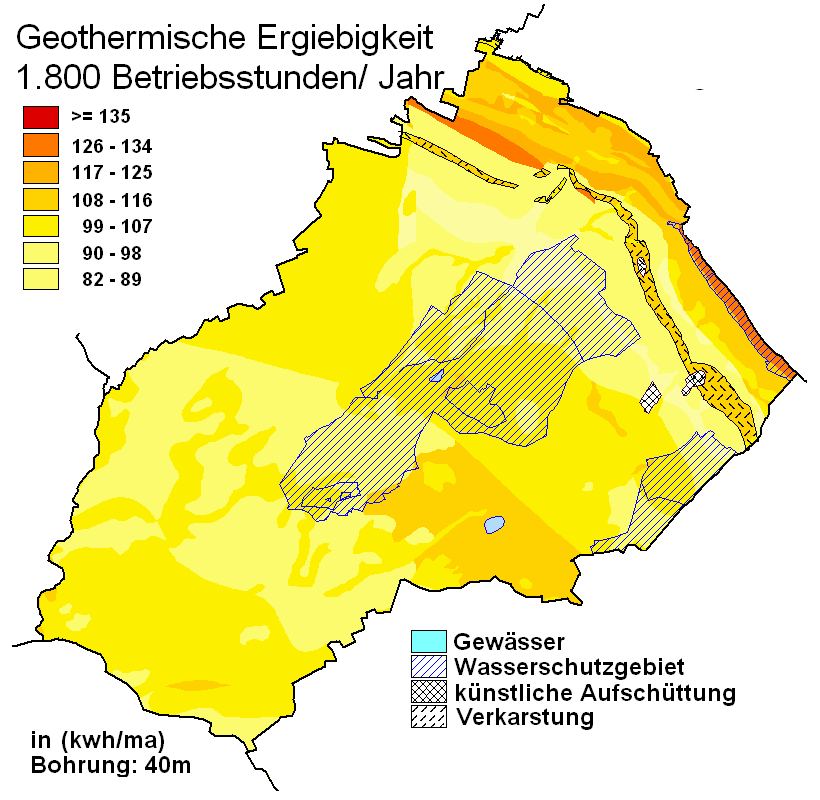
Geothermal map of Halle

The northern part of the town area of Halle is situated in the Teutoburg Forest mountain range, with the town limits running on the ridge in large parts. Towards the south the borough levels off into the sandy plains of the river Ems.

Halle is part of the north-eastern rim of the Westphalian Bay, that has approximately the shape of a bowl. Here the stones of the subsoil are steeply erected. They consist of marlstone with a high share of clay, marlstone with a high share of limestone, as well as limestone and marl themselves, but also of sandstone and sandy marl of the Mesozoic era (Cretaceous). These stones lie above a base of folded stones of the Paleozoic era (Devonian, Carboniferous). In the transition area towards the Münsterland the cretaceous layers are increasingly covered by a slim and mostly sandy layer of loose stones from the ice age (Quaternary), that consist of sedimentation of the river Ems and of deposits like ground moraines or meltwater sands.

With respect to soil, the Halle territory can be geomorphologically structured into three sections. The soils of the ditches, dells and lowlands in the southwest are filled with groundwater close to the surface. These gley soils are natural locations for grasslands. Peaks and ridges are rising from the lowlands consisting of dune sands und meltwater sands, which are sediments and sedimentary rock of the quaternary.

These sands have decomposed to nutrient-poor, acidic heather soils (Podsols), partly with hardpan in the subsoil. On the south-western slope of the Teutoburg Forest, for example near Künsebeck, they occupy large areas. As a consequence of historic tillage techniques and long-term agricultural usage these soils are partly composed of deeply rooting humus, in scattered areas with a sod coat. Some isolated dells are located in south-westerly direction of the main ridge of the Teutoburg Forest, for example the Hesseln mountains. Slim clay-loam soils (Rendzina) have developed here from limestone and marlstone of the Cretaceous. These basic soils are typical locations for precious hardwood. The main ridge, for example represented by the Große Egge (=Big Harrow), is composed of sandstone of the Cretaceous. On this stone thick, acidic and rocky heather soils have built up.

Halle is fairly to well, in areas on or near the ridge very well suited to use geothermal power sources by means of geothermal probes and heat production using a heat pump (see also adjoining map).

=== Dimensions and usage of urban area ===
Land utilization in Halle

The town covers an area of 69.21 square kilometres (26.72 mi^{2}). The major part consists of agricultural area (4,550 hectares (11,200 acres)) and forests (1,168 hectares (2,890 acres)), in total approx. 83%, followed by developed area (673 hectares (1,660 acres)) and circulation area (386 hectares (950 acres)), in total approx. 15%. The maximum stretch both in northern – southern direction and in western – eastern direction is approx. 10 km. The northernmost point is north of Eggeberg at approx. 52° 5´ 4´´ northern latitude, the southernmost point is south of Kölkebeck at approx. 51° 59´ 38´´.

Area acc. to Type of Usage	Agricultural Area	Forest Area	Buildings and Free Space	Traffic Area	Industrial Area	Water Area	Sports Area and Public Green Space	Other Usage
Area in km^{2}	45,5	11,68	6,73	3,86	0,85	0,30	0,23	0,13
Percentage of Total Area	65,68%	16,86%	9,71%	5,57%	1,23%	0,43%	0,33%	0,19%

=== Neighbouring communities ===
Halle borders the town of Borgholzhausen in the northwest, the town of Werther in the northeast, the community of Steinhagen in the southeast and south, the town of Harsewinkel in the southwest and the town of Versmold in the west, all belonging to the district of Gütersloh. Major neighbouring cities are Bielefeld and Gütersloh, both in approx. 15 km distance.

=== Subdivisions of the town ===
Halle (Westf.) is divided into ten urban districts, of which (besides Halle itself) only the industrial-suburban Künsebeck as well as the rural-agrarian villages Bokel, Hesseln, Hörste and Kölkebeck are built-up areas. While the rural-agrarian districts can be clearly distinguished as separate parts within the town limits the transition between Halle and Künsebeck is flowing. Oldendorf and Gartnisch have been entirely merged into Halle itself, Eggeberg and Ascheloh are only minor settlements. This segmentation is not regulated in the main statutes of Halle, no differentiation between the settlement areas is made there.

The following table gives an overview over the population in the parts of the town:

Urban District	Inhabitants	Urban Districts of Halle (Westfalen)
Bokel	854	Urban Districts of Halle (Westfalen)
Halle	13,558	Urban Districts of Halle (Westfalen)
Hesseln	1,406	Urban Districts of Halle (Westfalen)
Hörste	1,681	Urban Districts of Halle (Westfalen)
Kölkebeck	503	Urban Districts of Halle (Westfalen)
Künsebeck	3,583	Urban Districts of Halle (Westfalen)
Total	21,585	Urban Districts of Halle (Westfalen)

As of 2024, the population of Halle is 22,291.

Precipitation in Steinhagen-Brockhagen

=== Climate ===
Halle lies in the temperate zone of central Europe. It is located in an area of subatlantic oceanic climate. Due to the atlantic influence winters are mild and summers moderately warm. The average temperature is 8–8,5 °C, where towards the north in elevated and/ or leeward microclimates temperatures can fall substantially short of that. In certain areas the blooming period can begin two to four weeks later than further south.

Due to its location in the subatlantic oceanic climate a year-round humid climate with uniformly distributed precipitation prevails. At the weather station Brockhagen (belonging to Steinhagen (Westphalia)), situated just south of Halle, a yearly total of 775 mm precipitation is recorded on long-term average. Hence more precipitation than on German average is recorded, but considerably less than in a northern direction towards Halle. Due to the rain catching effect of the Teutoburg Forest orographic rainfall can amount to 1,200 mm per year.

== History ==
Halle is located in the Ravensberg Land or more specifically in the County of Ravensberg, deducted from the Burg Ravensberg located in the neighbouring community of Borgholzhausen. The vicissitudes of history were predominantly influenced by the bishops of Osnabrück, Napoleon and German emperors.

The area of the town and the former district of Halle formerly belonged to the Holy Roman Empire's County of Ravensberg. The latter was surrounded by the principalities of Osnabrück, Münster, Paderborn and Minden and was neighbouring the Principality of Lippe. In contrast to these principalities Ravensberg always has been secular estate, which at first belonged to the Counts of Ravensberg and later to their Jülich heirs. After this nobility also became extinct the county, along with others, came into possession of the house of Kleve-Mark and about a century later, via the Margraviate of Brandenburg, part of the kingdom of Prussia.

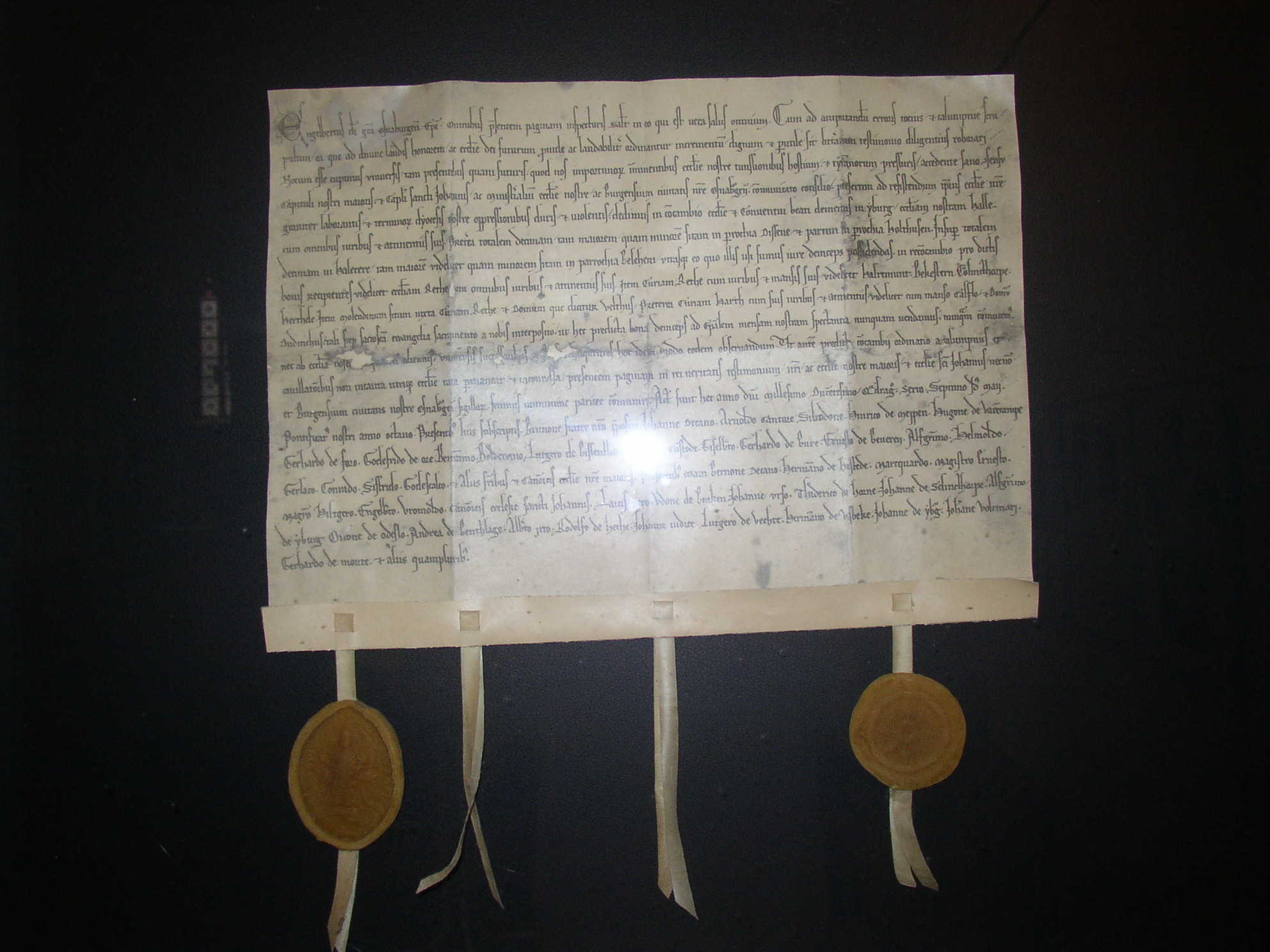
Replica of the 1246 swap charter

In the year 1246 bishop Engelbert of Osnabrück swapped the church "tor Halle", situated on the southern edge of his diocese, with all rights and duties with the castle and Benedictine Abbey Iburg in exchange for the church in Rheda with all rights and earnings. In the document, dating May 9, 1246, which seals the exchange – in a manner of speaking the certificate of birth – Halle is mentioned for the first time. The two villages Oldendorf and Gartnisch, today subdivisions of Halle embracing it in the east and west, are older than the present core of settlement. They are already mentioned as early as in the 11th century.

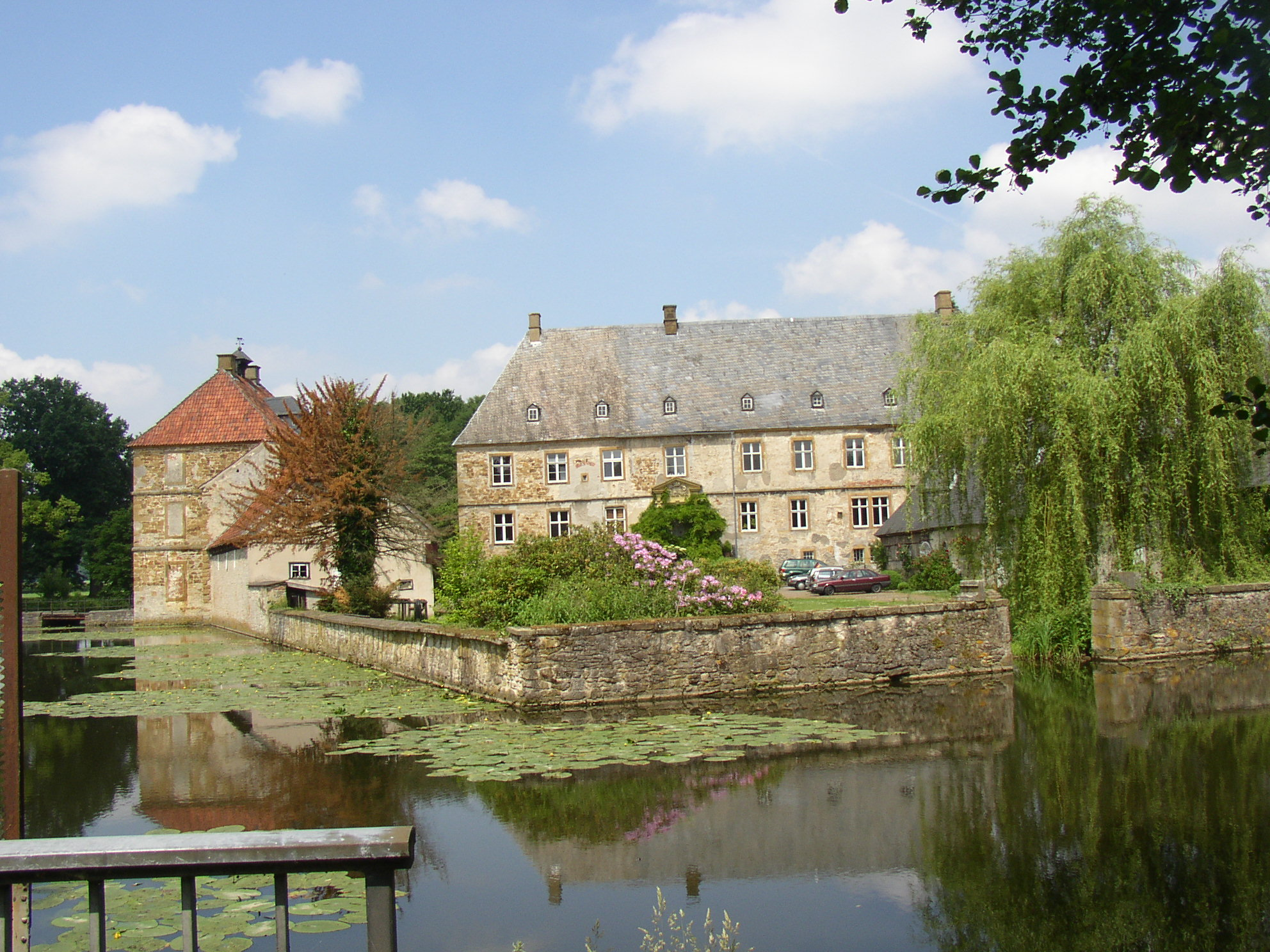
Moated castle Tatenhausen

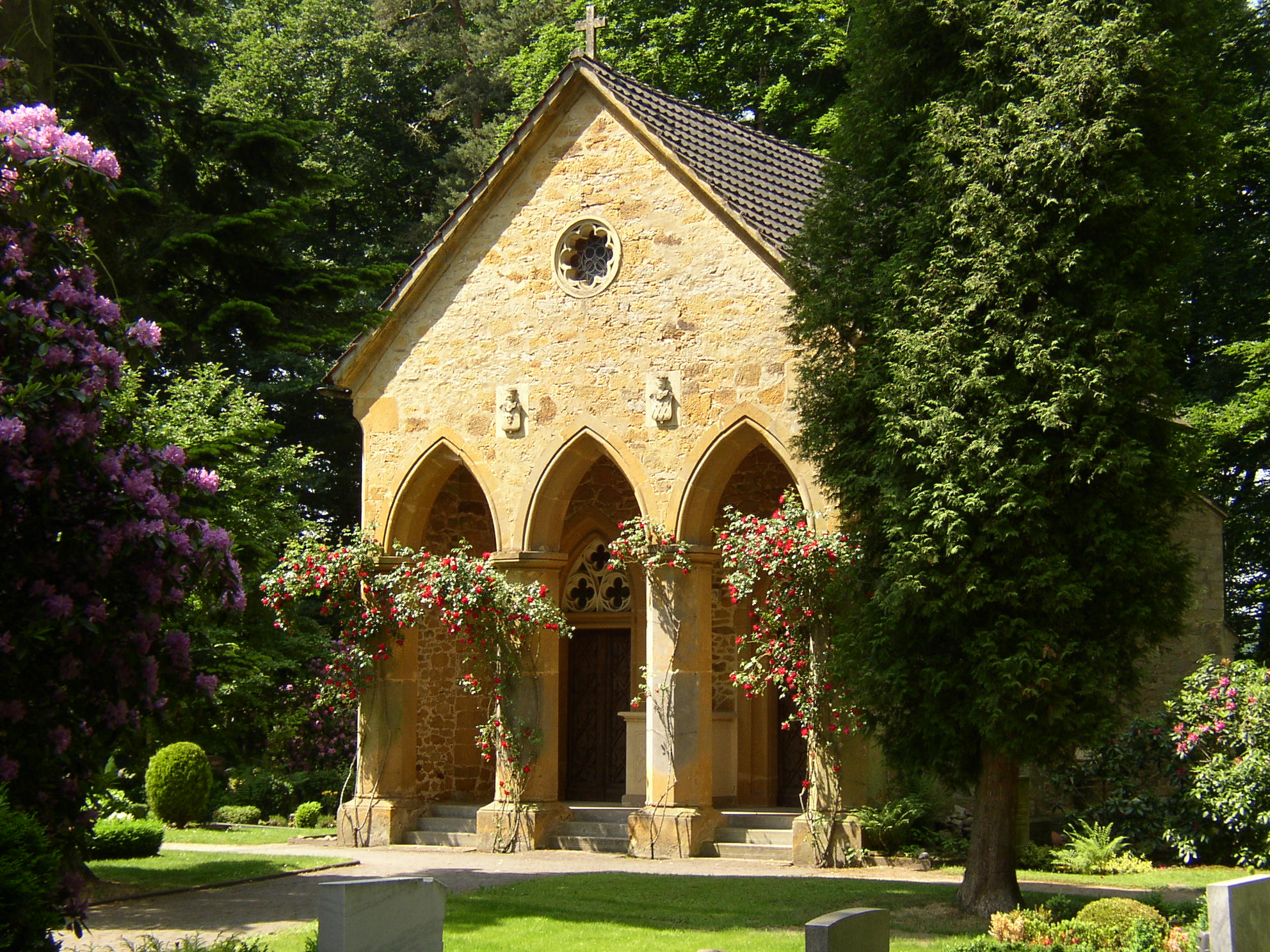
Mausoleum of the church Stockkämpen

The Ravensberg rent-roll, finalized in 1556, lists 49 names in Halle between the years 1491 and 1541, thereof 26 free citizens and 23 bondmen of the territorial lord (Landesherr) respectively of the noble landlords in Steinhausen and Tatenhausen. The population is estimated around 350 heads in the 16th century. During this time the Protestant Reformation began in Halle, gradually but largely changing people's religious affiliation. Only few noble families remained Roman Catholic, among them the Lords of castle Tatenhausen, in whose territory the catholic community Stockkämpen continues to exist to date.

On April 17, 1719, Halle was granted town privileges by king Frederick William I of Prussia and it was capital of the district of Halle for 150 years. As a result of the Prussian defeat against Napoleon the town came under French reign between 1807 and 1813. Temporarily Halle was divided, the border between the French Empire and the Kingdom of Westphalia passed through the town (partly alongside the Laibach creek). During this time the population suffered from the pressing encumbrances caused by the necessity to finance the French Revolutionary Wars.

In 1813, Prussia regained the administration. Halle was allocated to the Regierungsbezirk Minden in the Province of Westphalia and again became capital of its own district.

Until well into the 19th century Halle remained largely agrarian- oriented, mainly grain, flax or hemp was cultivated and animal husbandry was run. The traffic infrastructure of Halle, being located alongside several supra-regional roads, was not disadvantageous; however there were no paved roads until 1844 and the town was always outshined by Bielefeld.

In the mid-19th century the town changed its face with industrialization setting in and gained significance. In particular, the connection to the railway line "Haller Willem" (Bielefeld-Osnabrück) since 1886 played a prominent role. A brandy distillery (Kisker), cold-meat factories and woodwork undertakings came into existence.

The next essential change was brought by World War II respectively its consequences. Owing to the absorption and integration of a large number of refugees grave economic and demographic shifts were brought about.

After almost 160 years Halle lost its position as district capital due to a reorganization of administrative districts in 1973: Gütersloh became capital of the new district. Until then Halle even had its own license plate code "HW".

There are no known documents about the name Halle and the nascence of the town. The most common (but non- provable) explanation is that it is derived from "hale", meaning salt.

=== Religion ===
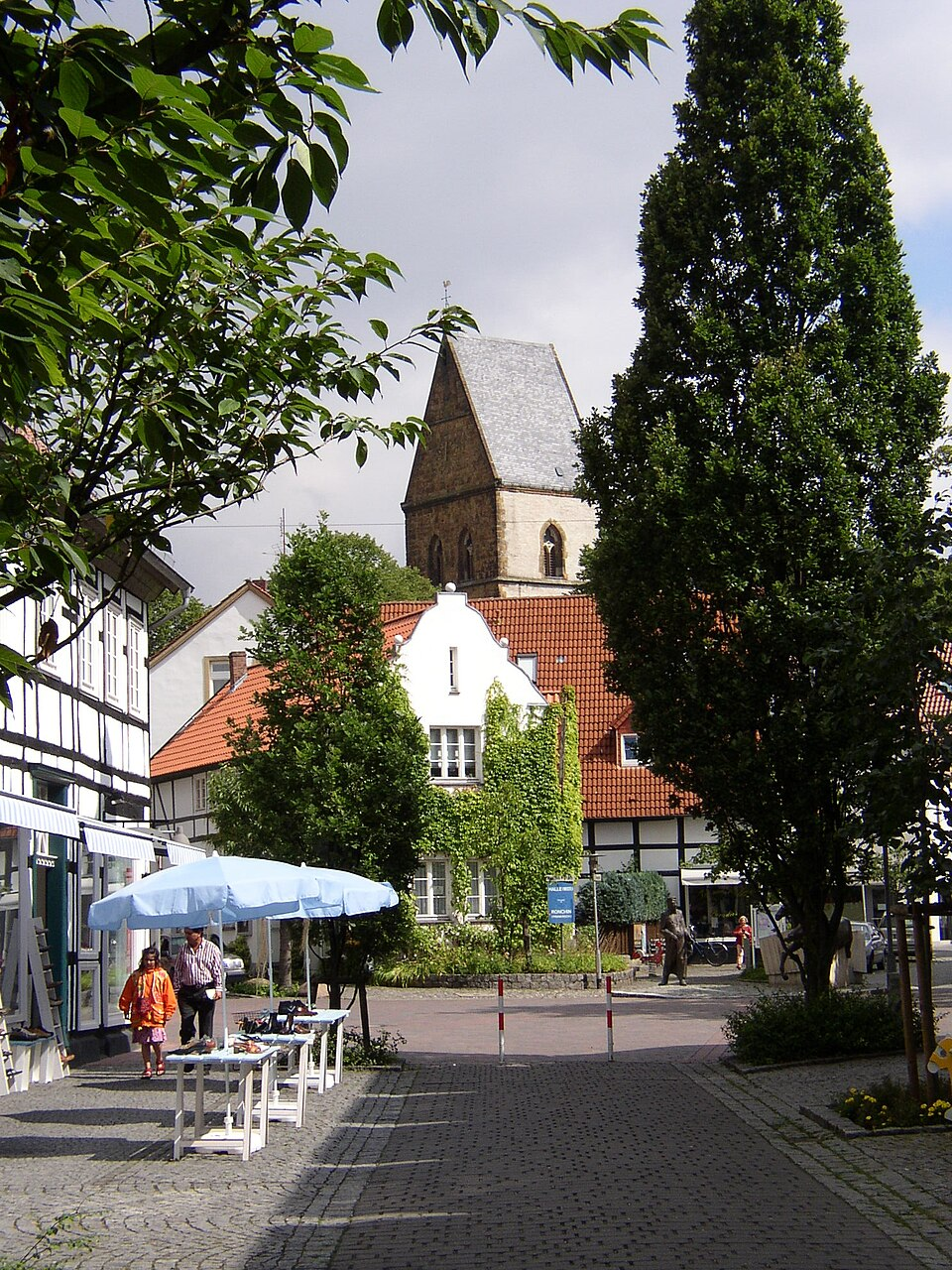
The "Heart of Halle" with Lutheran St. John's church and Ronchin-Platz in front

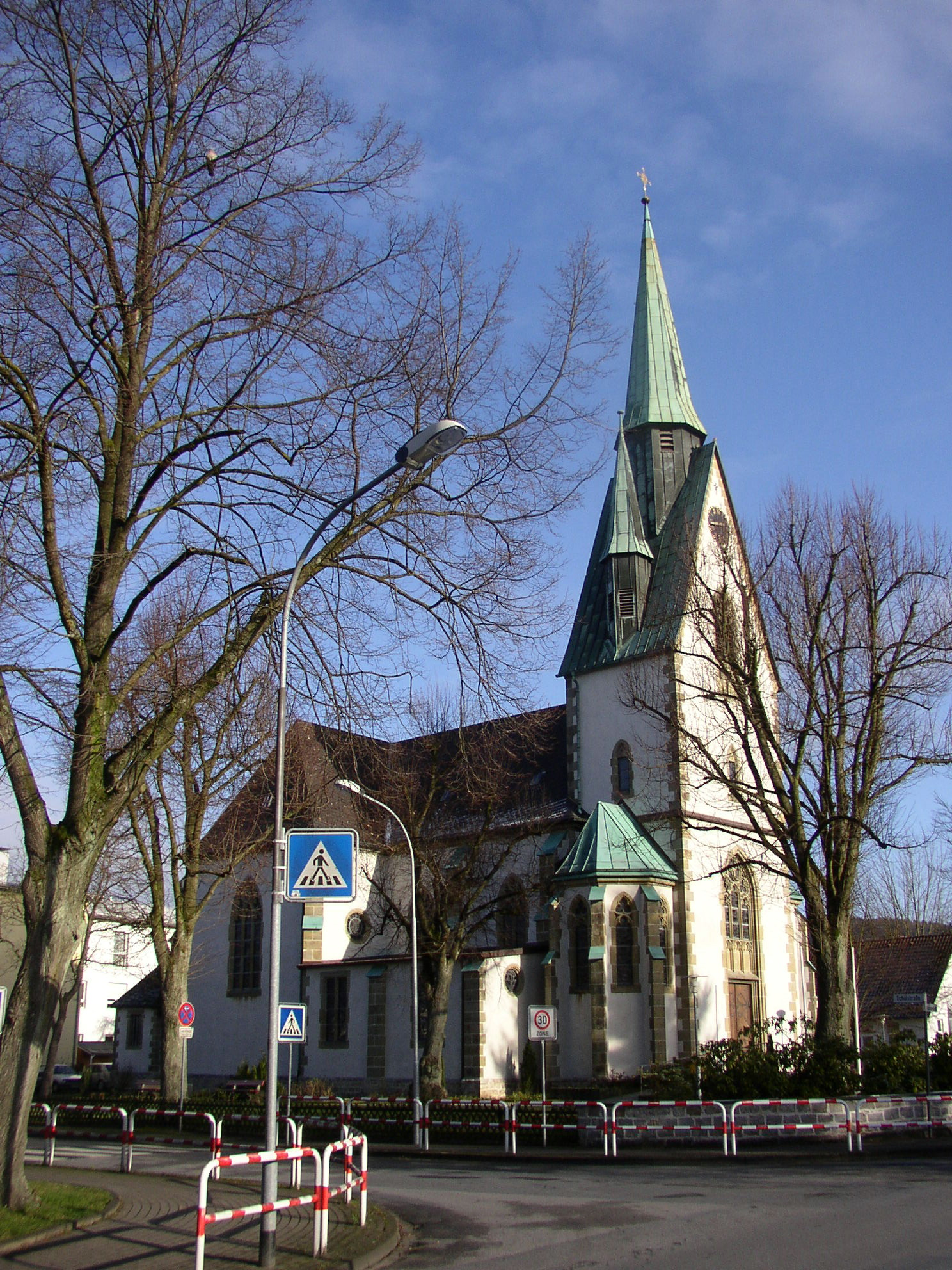
Catholic Sacred Heart of Jesus Church

More than half of the population is member of Lutheran churches, some 15% are Roman Catholic. Besides the Lutheran parish of Evangelical Church of Westphalia (with the two churches of St. Johannis and Hörste) and the Catholic parish Herz-Jesu (Sacred Heart of Jesus) there are also the Free Church congregations of the Mennonites-Plymouth Brethren, the New Apostolic Church and the Free Evangelical Church. Muslims can attend services in the Ayasofya Mosque of the Turkish-Islamic cultural association and additionally Jehovah's Witnesses as well as the Kurdish Yazidi are represented with one parochial bodies each.

=== Incorporations ===
On October 1, 1938 the community Oldendorf and on October 1, 1956 a part of the community Gartnisch were amalgamated into the town of Halle.

Within the scope of the government reorganization of North Rhine-Westphalia and based on the "Gesetz zur Neugliederung von Gemeinden des Landkreises Halle (Law on reorganization of communities in the rural district Halle)" dating June 24, 1969 the communities Ascheloh, Eggeberg and Gartnisch where transferred from the Amt Halle (Westf.) (administrative office of Halle (Westf.)) into the town of Halle.

Due to the "Bielefeld-law", dating October 24, 1972 the town of Halle was united with the communities of Bokel, Hesseln, Hörste, Kölkebeck and Künsebeck on January 1, 1973. The new town of Halle also replaced the former administrative office of Halle. Based on the same law parts of the communities of Amshausen, Borgholzhausen, Brockhagen and Theenhausen were integrated into the town.

=== Inhabitants ===
Population Development in Halle from 1818 to 2007 (upper line: present territory, lower line: respective territory

With a few restrictions the population figures on Halle can be traced back to the year 1491. In the years 1491–1541 the inhabitants count is stated with approx. 49. Between 1500 and 1600 this number grew to approx. 350.

It is for the year 1871 that an exact number of inhabitants is known, Halle had 5,545 inhabitants at the time, including later incorporations to the borough. Without these incorporations Halle had roughly 1,600 inhabitants in the year 1880. For the year 1939 a number of 3,500 (without incorporations) and 8,169 (with incorporations) is known.

Due to a large number of refugees that came into Halle as a consequence of World War II the number of inhabitants grew to 15,258 (with incorporations until December 31, 1961.

Since the incorporation of surrounding villages in 1973 generally only one combined figure is surveyed. As of December 2025, the population is estimated to be 21,366.

Historical population

Year	Pop.	±% p.a.
1491	49	—
1541	49	+0.00%
1600	350	+3.39%
1818	1,070	+0.51%
1831	1,280	+1.39%
1837	1,343	+0.80%
1843	1,452	+1.31%
1849	1,423	−0.34%
1852	1,447	+0.56%
1858	1,415	−0.37%
1861	1,445	+0.70%
1867	1,503	+0.66%

Year	Pop.	±% p.a.
1871	1,480	−0.38%
1885	1,711	+1.04%
1895	1,758	+0.27%
1905	1,841	+0.46%
1925	2,094	+0.65%
1933	2,309	+1.23%
1939	3,393	+6.63%
1946	5,234	+6.39%
1950	5,805	+2.62%
1961	7,542	+2.41%
1970	10,123	+3.32%

Population data refer to the area corresponding with the municipality before 1973.

Historical population

Year	Pop.	±% p.a.
1871	5,545	—
1939	8,351	+0.60%
1950	13,853	+4.71%
1961	15,573	+1.07%
1965	16,318	+1.18%
1970	17,431	+1.33%
1975	17,868	+0.50%
1980	18,556	+0.76%
1985	18,323	−0.25%

Year	Pop.	±% p.a.
1990	18,841	+0.56%
1995	19,502	+0.69%
2000	20,478	+0.98%
2005	21,283	+0.77%
2010	21,081	−0.19%
2015	21,709	+0.59%
2020	21,448	−0.24%
2025	21,366	−0.08%

Population data refer to the area corresponding with the municipality as of 2025.
Source: Landesdatabank Nordrhein-Westfalen (1965-2025)

The Community Profile of the North Rhine-Westphalian authority for data processing and statistics typecasts Halle as a "small medium-sized town" and compares it to other cities of that type. While the population development was comparable to other cities of the same type until c. 2001 the increase in Halle is substantially higher since then. On an Index the average for the type "small medium-sized town" arrived at 115 (1976 = 100), whereas Halle reached 119, in effect roughly 3.5% higher. Comparing the population increase with North Rhine-Westphalia in total, the figure increases to 12.3%. However, the growth mainly recruits from migration since for a number of years the relation between birth rate and death rate has been even.

Compared to other cities of the same type as well as to North Rhine-Westphalia there are no statistically significant deviations with respect to the population structure based on age groups, but Halle has a significantly lower number of severely disabled persons.

== Politics ==
=== Town council ===
As a result of communal elections on August 30, 2009 currently the CDU, the SPD, The Greens, the FDP as well as two independent voters' alliances, the UWG and the STU (agenda party favouring a specific marked-out route for the unfinished motorway) are represented in the Halle town council.

Communal politics are strongly coined by local topics, with one of the major issues of the voters being the future dealing with the Bundesautobahn 33 (see below). The above-mentioned STU stood for election for the first time in 2004, their only agenda being the continuation of the Autobahn on a specific marked-out route. The STU gained 6 seats at the first go and took away votes mainly from the CDU, but also from the SPD. In the elections in 2009 the party suffered great losses.

	2009		2004		1999		1994		1989		1984		1979		1975	
Party	Seats	%	Seats	%	Seats	%	Seats	%	Seats	%	Seats	%	Seats	%		
CDU	13	33,17	14	36,08	19	49,06	17	40,94	n/v	37,62	18	43,23	18	46,40	n/v	49,78
SPD	13	33,47	11	27,76	12	31,54	14	36,01	n/v	34,10	15	35,73	14	35,23	n/v	40,45
Greens	4	11,85	3	8,06	3	8,03	4	11,17	n/v	9,29	4	9,88	–	–	–	–
FDP	2	6,58	2	5,23	2	4,50	2	5,43	n/v	10,07	0	4,89	3	8,30	n/v	9,77
UWG	3	7,20	2	6,09	2	6,88	2	6,44	n/v	8,91	4	6,27	2	10,07	–	–
STU	3	7,73	6	16,78	–	–	–	–	–	–	–	–	–	–	–	–
total ^{1}	38	100	38	100	38	100	39	100	n/v	100	41	100	37	100	n/v	100
voter participation	58,11		57,61		60,73		84,23		69,60		70,22		71,14		86,79	

^{1}not considering rounding errors

Distribution of Seats in Town Council since 2009

Distribution of Seats in Town Council between 2004 and 2009

Comparison: Distribution between 1999 and 2004

=== Mayor ===
Name	Term of Office	Remark
Thomas Tappe	2020–incumbent	
Anne Rodenbrock-Wesselmann	2002–2020	second directly elected mayoress in North Rhine-Westphalia
Jürgen Wolff	1997–2002	resigned due to age
Wilhelm Bentlage	1969–1997	honorary mayor
Heinrich Thomas	until 1969	died in office

=== Coat of arms ===

The coat of arms of Halle shows three silver lilies on red ground. In the foreground the heart sign shows the coat of arms of the County of Ravensberg (three red chevrons on silver). The three lilies assumedly date back to an official community seal of the 18th century.

It was granted for the first time in 1908 by order of the King of Prussia, continued to be used unchanged after the incorporations of 1973.

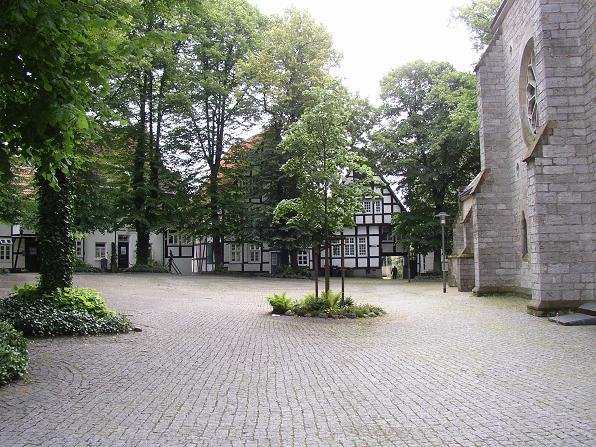
In the Heart of Halle, viewing east

== International relations ==
The town twinning between Halle and Ronchin (France) dates back to September 22, 1984. In honour of the twinning a central square in Halle was named Ronchin-Platz (Platz = square). There is regular cultural exchange and sporting encounters. During the town fest Haller Willem Ronchin is represented with a stand offering local delicacies.

== Culture and sights ==
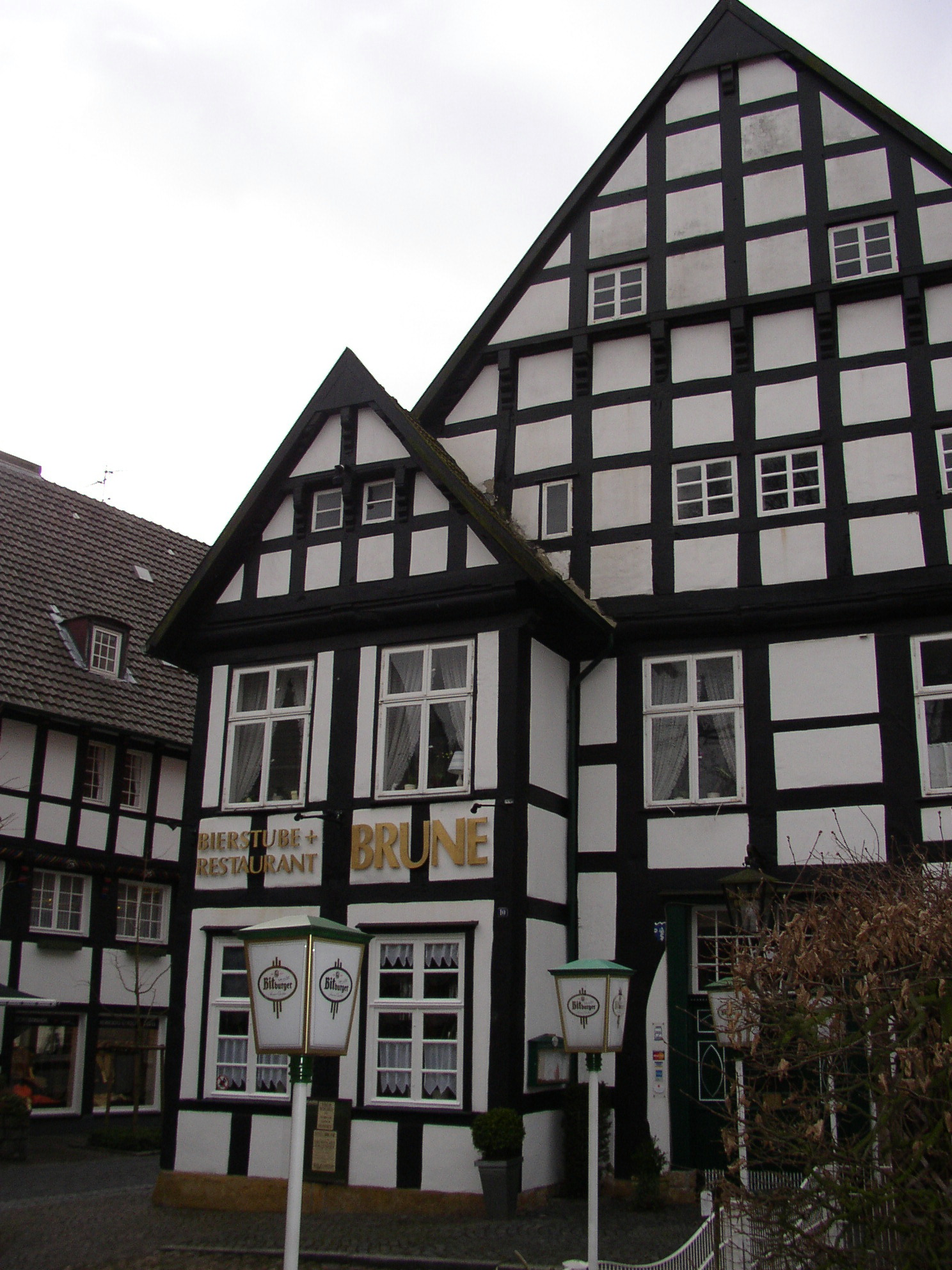
Bahnhofstrasse 10 with bay windows

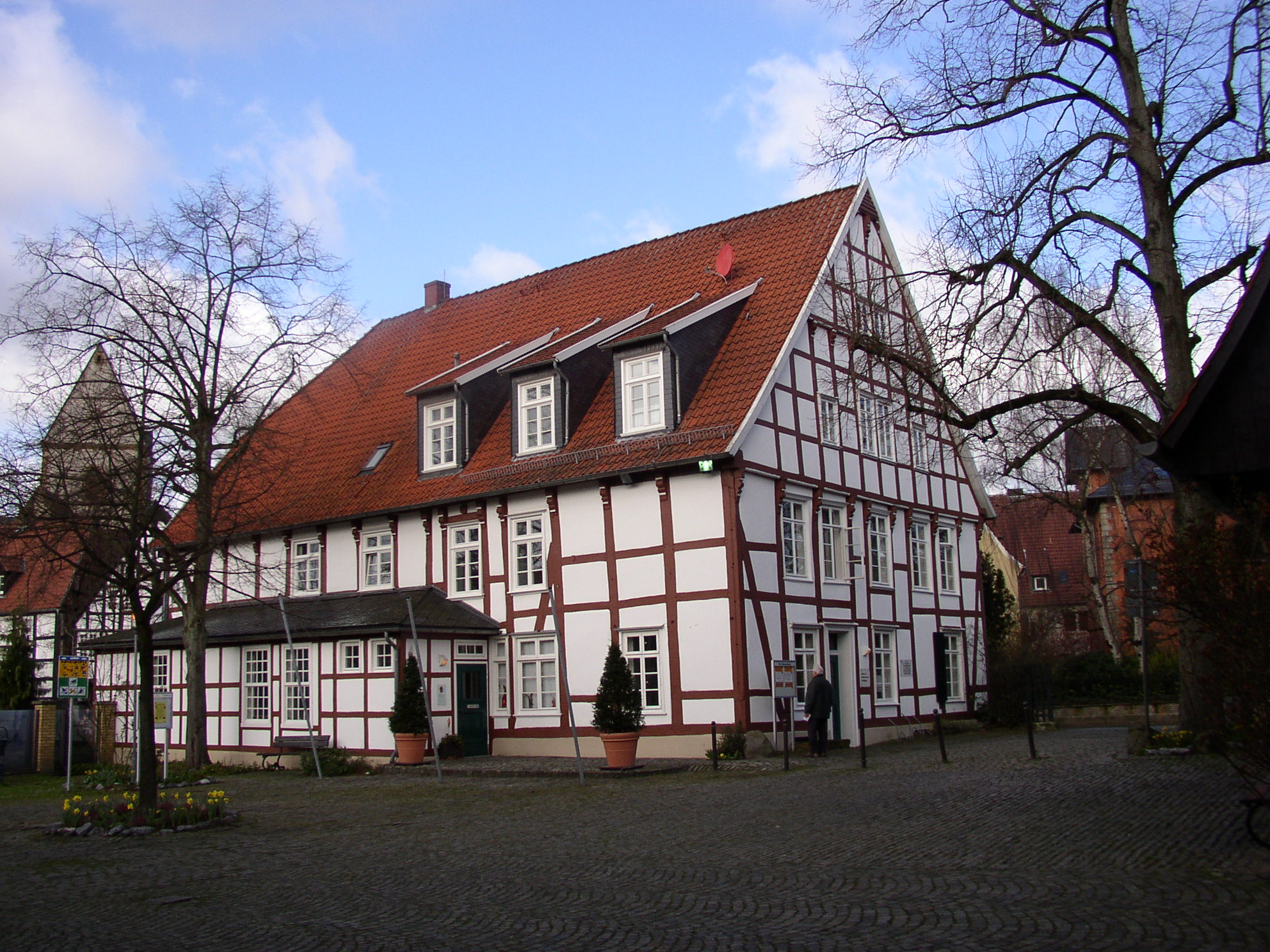
Kisker House

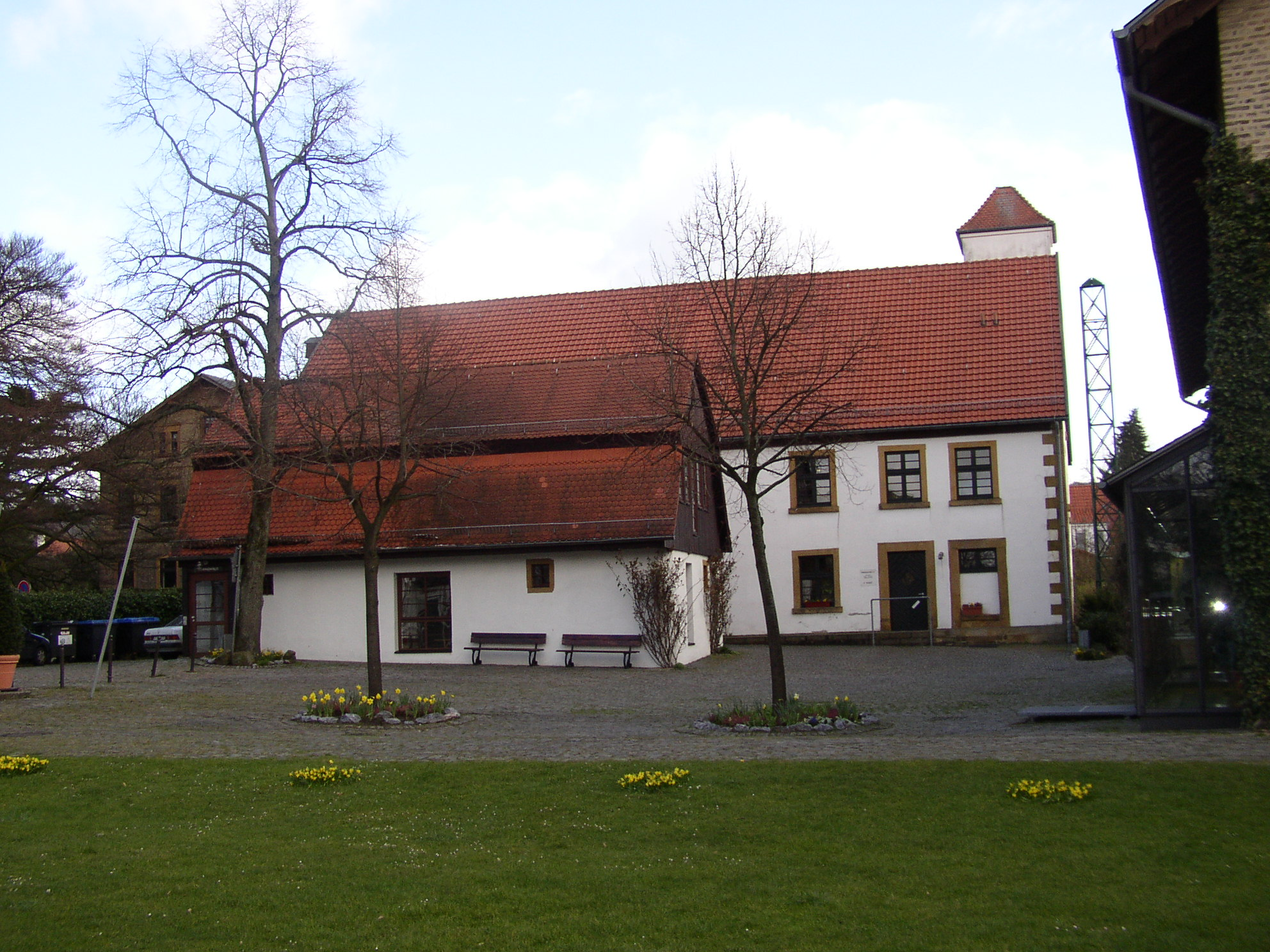
Ham House (in the front) and Distillery

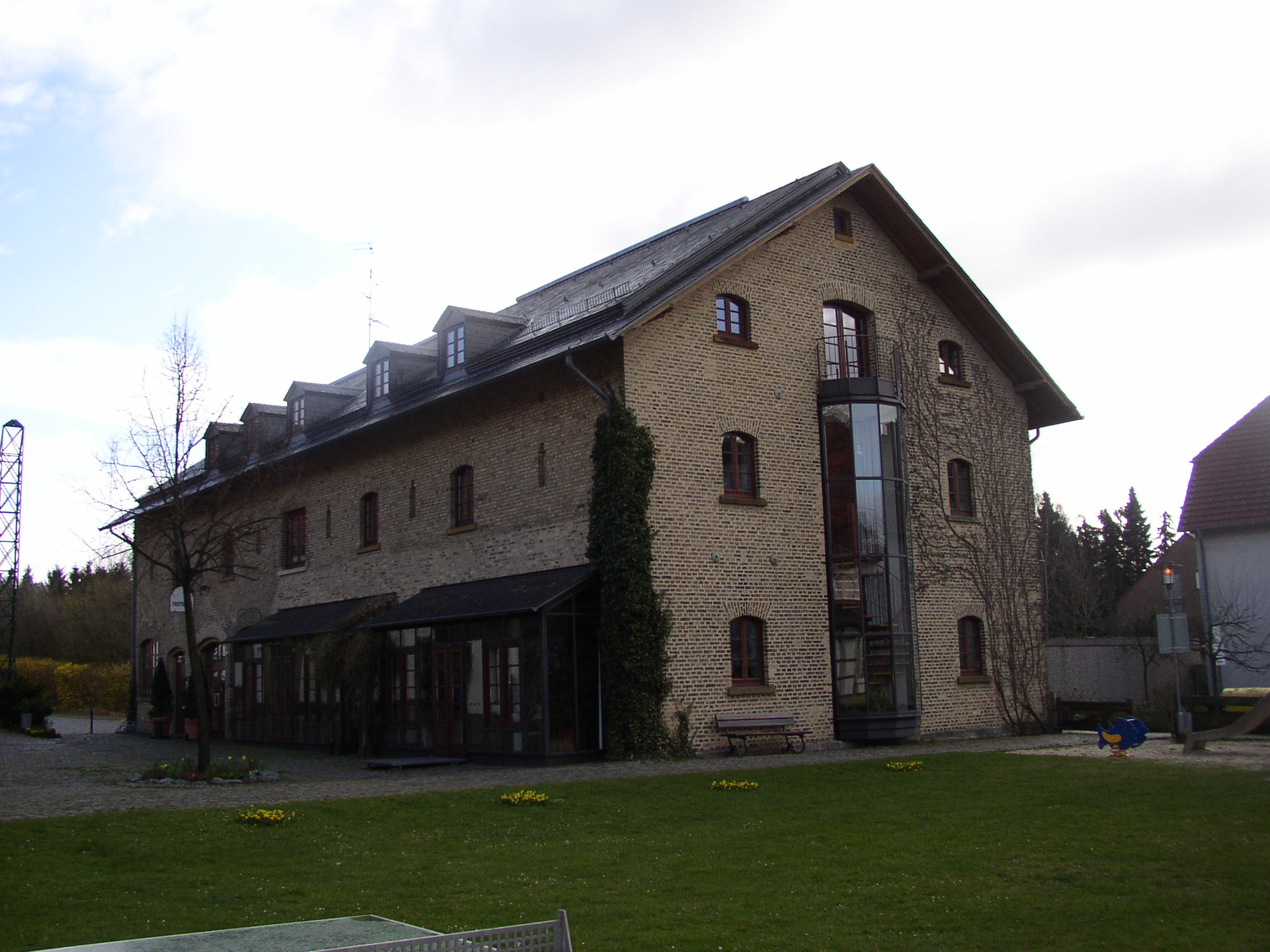
Remise

=== Architecture ===
==== In town ====
- The Protestant parish church is located amidst the tree-lined church square and surrounded by half-timbered buildings, altogether often called "The Heart of Halle". The arched building was originally built single-nave in the 13th century; a square choir and a west tower were added to the southern side aisle in the 15th century. The northern addition dates from 1886. Remnants of Baroque features in the interior could be preserved, among them the sandstone pulpit of 1716. In the northern side aisle there is a gallery balustrade that dates back to 1661. The church was equipped with a new organ in 1992. The church square was Halle's most important graveyard until 1828.
- To this date a considerable number of half-timbered buildings could be preserved. The built-up area around the church has an impressive closedness, only few comparable structures are preserved in the area (compare Delbrück, Gütersloh). The oldest building is Kirchplatz No. 3, which was dated dendrochronologically to the year 1512. Kirchplatz No. 11 has a storefront that is carved with fan rosettes, the storefront was used for a new building after the old building to which it originally belonged was broken down. In the nearby Bahnhofstraße there are further eminent half-timbered buildings. The house no. 10 is exceptionally stately, showing a special form of bay windows to the street, that dates back to the 17th century.
- Kiskerhaus (Kisker House), nowadays used by the folk high school. The former head office of the Kisker distillery consists of an older core building from 1692 that was extended in 1712. It served as residence and office. On the same compound furthermore the Schinkenhaus (Ham House), a plastered stone house with garret roof and a half-timbered gavel to the northwest, the distillery house, built early in the 19th century and with the old distillery in the cellar that can be sightseen to date, and the remise, built as a coach and store house around 1880.
- The Catholic Church Herz-Jesu was inaugurated on November 14, 1909. The building was donated by Countess Julia Korff-Schmising- Kerßenbrock.
- In front of the old building of the county court a war memorial can be seen, which was erected in 1898. The inscription reads: Ihren in den siegreichen Feldzügen 1866 und 1870/71 gefallenen Soehnen in Darkbarkeit; Die Kirchengemeinde Halle i./W. 1898 (With gratitude to its sons killed in action in the victorious expeditions of 1866 and 1870/71; The parish of Halle i./W. 1898)

==== Out of town ====
- The moated castle Tatenhausen is situated in the Tatenhausen Forest. The castle was ancestral home to the barons and counts von Korff, called Schmising. It was built in the Weser Renaissance style. The erection of the east wing started in the year 1540, based on foundations from the 14th century. The centre section and the west wing were built in Baroque style in the 18th century. The Baroque style orangery was designed by Johann Conrad Schlaun in 1751. The castle is still inhabited. The surrounding lake is fed by the creek Laibach.
- The Kaffeemühle ("Burr Mill"; 52° 04′ 09″ N, 8° 22′ 03″ O) is a building in the Teutoburg Forest. It was built by the Hagedorn family, a merchant family from Bremen that worked in Halle. It is in possession of the town of Halle by way of donation by the families Julius and Florenz Kisker since 1904. The building offers views on Halle as well as the surrounding region to the south. The name of the building has been coined by the public because of its great resemblance to a burr mill.
- Shortly below the burr mill the Hagedorn Memorial was erected in honour of Hermann Hagedorn on the occasion of his 68th birthday.
- On a number of places on the slopes of Teutoburg Forest bordered forest graveyards can be found, e.g. at 52° 04' 11" N, 8° 22' 00" O.
- Also on the slopes of the Teutoburg Forest a Walther von der Vogelweide-Memorial can be found (52° 04' 06" N, 8° 22' 13" O). Its erection was encouraged as of 1920 by the Ravensberg Men's Choral Society, despite the known fact that Vogelweide had never visited the region. By its construction the singing club wanted to express its great attachment to Walther von der Vogelweide. The memorial was unveiled in 1930 in Vogelweide's 700th year of death. Since the singing club annually holds its traditional Whitsun Singing at the memorial. The inscription on the memorial reads: Grüß Gott mit hellem Klang / Heil deutschem Wort und Sang; Zur Erinnerung an das 700. Todesjahr Walther's von der Vogelweide / Halle(Westf.) den 29.Juni 1930 / Männer-Gesang-Verein Ravensberg / "Walther von der Vogelweide, wer sein vergäße, tät mir leid!" (Greetings with bright clang / Hail to German word and sang; To commemorate the 700th year of death of Walther von der Vogelweide / Halle(Westf.) June 29, 1930 / Ravensberg Men's Choral Society / "Walther von der Vogelweide, he who would forget him would have my pity!"). The memorial is a station on the cultural path of Teutoburger Wald Laibachweg.
- Halle was home to coal and iron ore mining for roughly 400 years. In the year 1505 Duke Wilhelm IV. of Jülich-Berg granted rights to his stadtholder Count Philipp II. of Waldeck to erect mines in the County of Ravensberg. The first pit assumedly was in the borderland between Halle and Werther. In the mid-17th century coal digging also took place in Eggeberg. Furthermore, ore was searched near the surface on the hilltop of the Teutoburg Forest. Log wood to support the extension of the pits was available in abundance in the Teutoburg Forest. In the middle of the 18th century coal mining yielded due to high wood prices and difficulties to import less expensive coal. During the mining booms in the 19th century there were as many as 23 coal pits and 24 pits for near-surface ore. All pits were closed down in 1883 due to the growing impact of the Cologne-Minden railway line and the options to import coal cheaper from the Ruhr Area. Due to the Occupation of the Ruhr by French troops in 1923 one drift was reopened for a short period. On a marked hiking trail starting at 52° 04′ 27″ N, 8° 22′ 02″ O with an information panel the hiker goes past some of the old drifts and the pithead building.

=== Parks ===
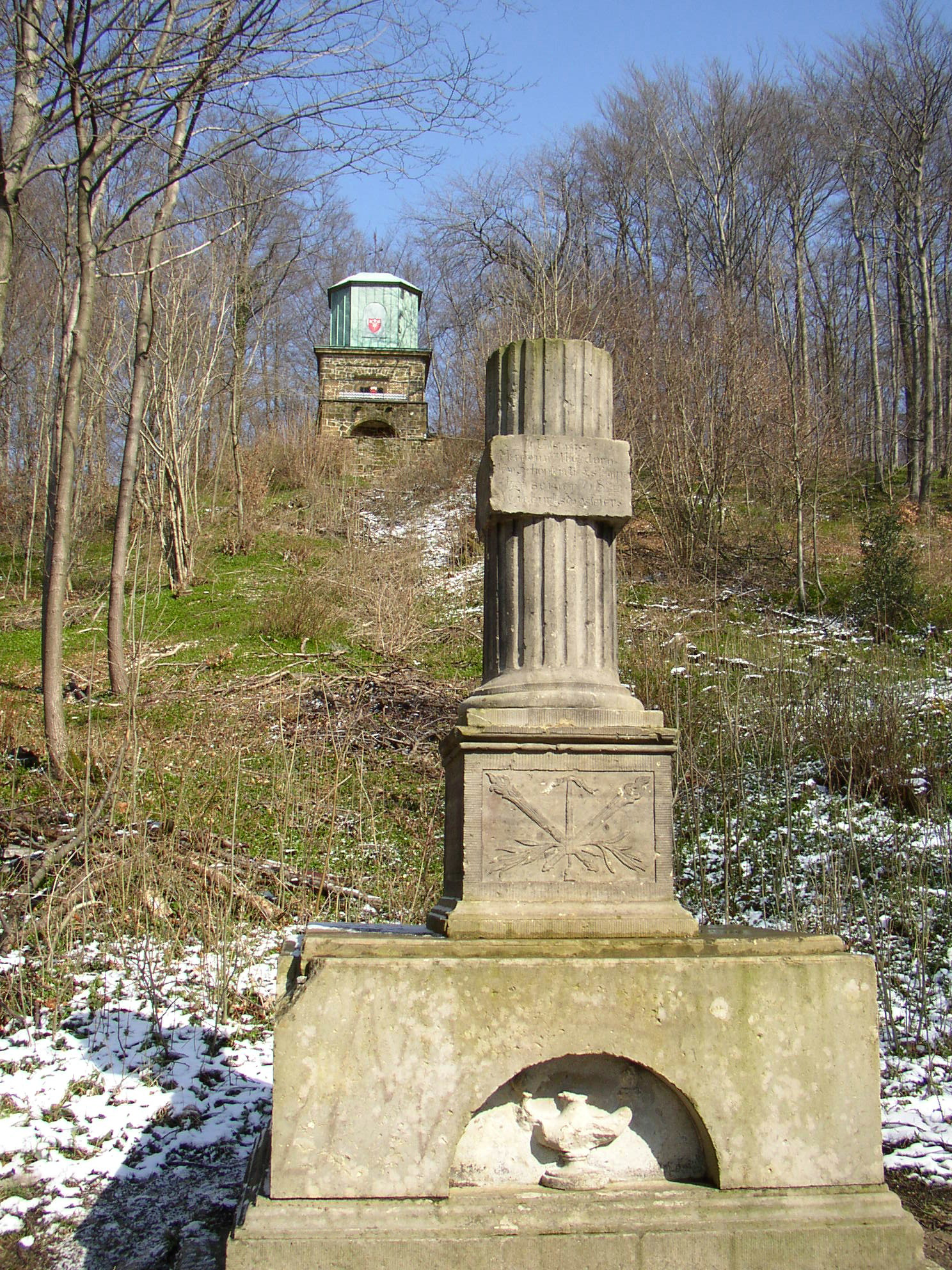
Burr Mill and Hagedorn-Memorial on the southern slopes of the nature reserve Knüll/ Storkenberg

Halle has no laid-out parks. Merely the Friedhof I (Cemetery I) near the train station is park-like with large free spaces. Numerous playgrounds, among them those covering a relatively vast area, e.g. the Laibach-playground, are used like parks by the population.

=== Museums ===
Halle has the only "museum for works of childhood and adolescence of important artists" in the world. Namely paintings during adolescence of artists like Paul and Felix Klee, August Macke, Ernst Ludwig Kirchner and Pablo Picasso are in the focus of the museum's work.

In the remise of the Kisker House there are regular single and group exhibitions of visual arts with regional reference. Contemporary artwork, sculptures, acrylic, oil and aquarelle paintings and photo arts are presented.

In the former leather manufacture Güttgemanns more than 15 local artists and artisans took domicile. They regularly organize joint exhibitions and presentations.

=== Music ===
In February Halle hosts the super regionally renowned "Haller Bachtage", with choir- and orchestra concerts, chamber and organ concerts being staged during one week. In many cases international celebrities of classical music can be engaged (Peter Schreier, Thomas Quasthoff, Petr Eben a.o.).

=== Natural monuments and nature reserves ===
Schematic Overview of the nature reserves in Halle

In terms of nature reserves Halle has an outstanding position in the district of Gütersloh in more than one respect, since with a total of seven designated nature reserves it is home to the highest number and the single biggest reserve of all communities in the district. Also with 939.3 ha the total area covered by the reserves is in absolute area as well percental with roughly 13.6% in relation to the community territory the biggest in the district.

Approx. 437 acres (1.77 km^{2}) of the Tatenhausen Forest are protected by the Habitats Directive of the European Union. This area hosts rare bats like the Bechstein bat, the greater mouse-eared bat and the pond bat. Moreover, the Laibach creek is a habitat for the common kingfisher. The reserve is the only known habitat for the rare great capricorn beetle in Germany. Typical types of biotopes are mixed forests of beech and oak with a high degree of old wood and alder-ash tree-pasture forests.

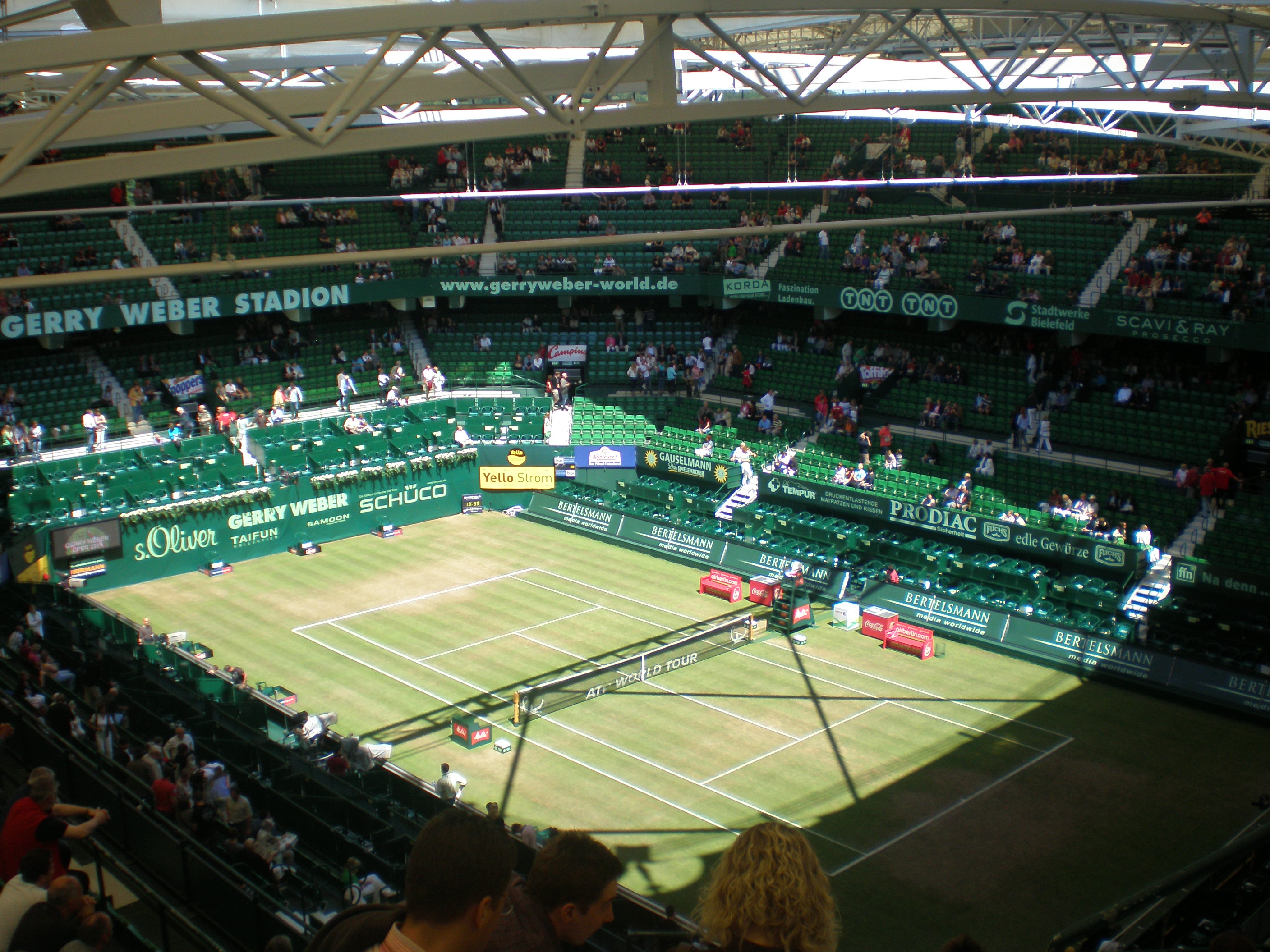
Gerry Weber Stadion 2009

=== Sports ===
Every year in June Halle hosts the Halle Open, one of a handful of ATP tournaments in the world played on grass. Tennis professionals use this tournament as a tune-up for Wimbledon.

In 2007 the Gerry-Weber-Stadium, which is the 2nd- biggest stadium in the district of Gütersloh, hosted several matches of World Men's Handball Championship.

The men's team of "TC Blau-Weiß Halle" have won the German Team Tennis Championships in 1995 and 2006.

There is a number of possibilities to do sports in clubs:

- various football clubs
- various tennis clubs
- various gymnastics clubs
- Teutoburger Wald Golf Club with 27 holes
- CVJM athletics club
- Canadian Canoe Club
- 1st RSC Gerry Weber Rackets e. V., Squash Club
- 1st sports fishing club of Halle
- Automobile Club Halle (Westf.) e. V.
- Karate Dojo Halle e. V.
- Karate Dojo Mushin Halle of 1991
- Modellfluggruppe Halle (Westf.)
- Halle Horse Riding and Carriage Driving Club
- Halle 1946 / Künsebeck 1948 e. V. Chess Club
- Halle (Westf.) Swimming Club
- Halle Folk Dance Club

=== Regular events ===
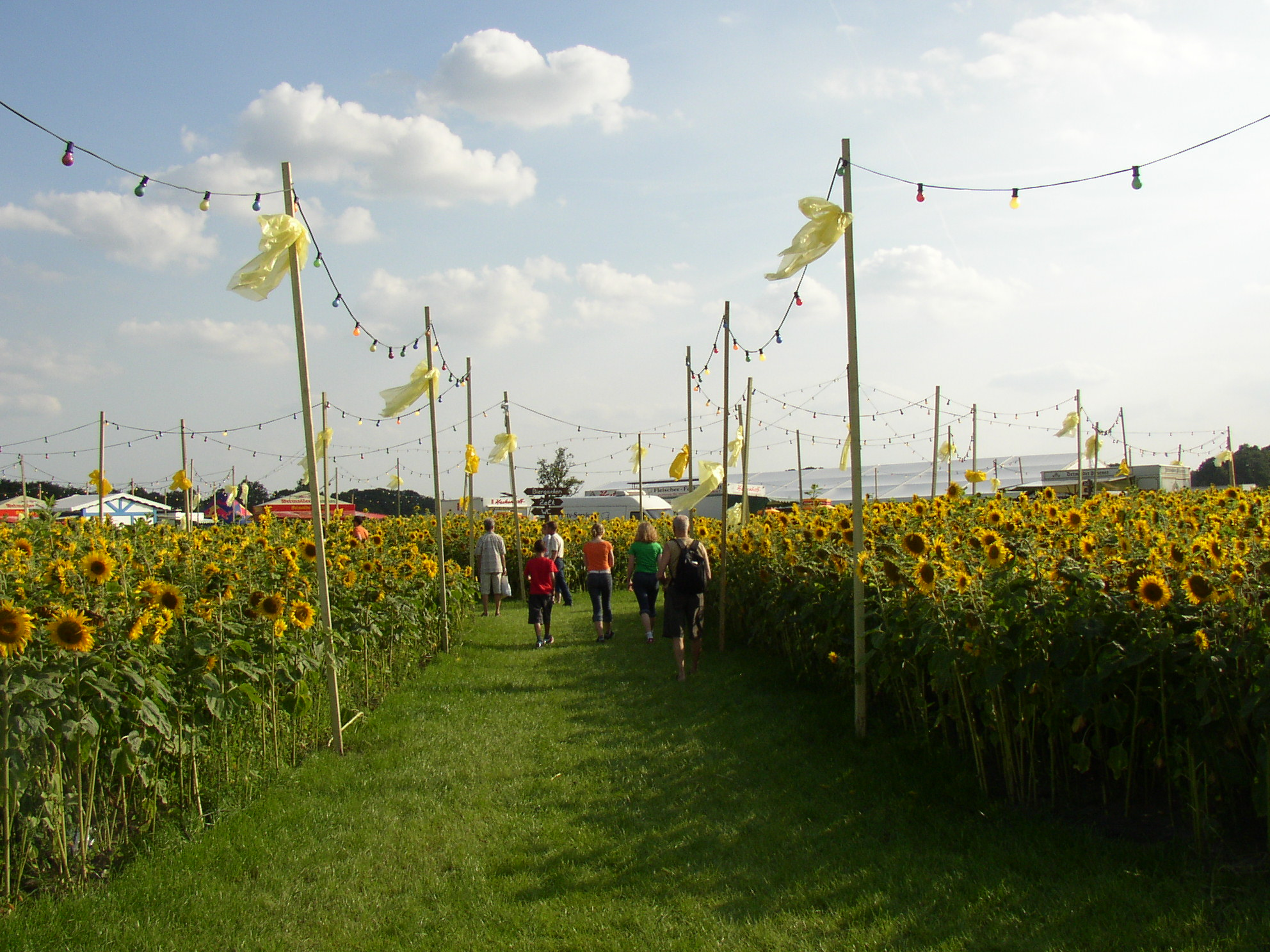
Before the Party in the yellow pond

Besides the Gerry-Weber-Open and the "Haller Bachtage", mentioned in earlier sections, the town fest "Haller Willem" traditionally takes place on Ascension Day.

Further regular events are:

- Weekly Market: The weekly market takes place in town centre each Friday
- Hörster Bummel: an annual funfair in the village Hörste
- Hemdsärmelball: an annual folk festival
- Party im gelben See (= party in the yellow pond): an annual folk festival on a field with sunflowers that have been sown for this occasion
- Christmas Market: annual market around the Protestant church, takes place on one of the Advent Sundays
- Gewerbeschau Gartnisch: annual exhibition of local trade and industry

== Infrastructure ==
=== Traffic ===
==== Road traffic ====
The A 33 motorway runs through Halle. For decades the planning of this motorway had been politically controversial because the route runs through the Tatenhausen Forest, part of which is protected by the FFH. However, the final lawsuit was dismissed in 2012 and the gap in the motorway was subsequently closed with the final section being opened in November 2019.

Following the completion of the A33 motorway, the former section of the B 68 federal highway running through the center of Halle was demoted to the status of state road in 2021.

==== Train and bus transport ====
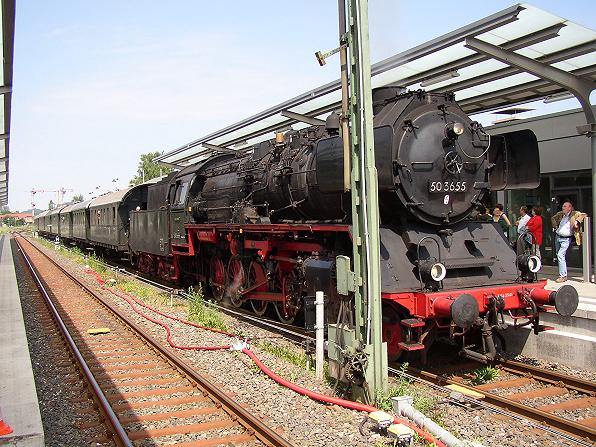
Halle(Westf) station with historic train during town festival of Haller Willem in May 2003

The railway stations of "Halle (Westf.)", "Künsebeck", "Halle Gerry-Weber-Stadion" and "Hesseln" are located alongside the railway tracks of the Haller Willem (KBS 402). The identically named Regionalbahn commutes hourly between Bielefeld, Halle and Osnabrück (during weekdays partly half-hourly between Bielefeld and Halle). The service is run by the NordWestBahn which uses Talent trains for speeds up to 120 km/h. The line was opened in 1886.

Regional buses run to Bielefeld, Gütersloh, Werther (Westphalia), Steinhagen (Westphalia), Brockhagen and Versmold.

For all public transport within North Rhine-Westphalia there are two unified tariffs: Der Sechser and the NRW-tariff. For connections to Osnabrück an additional tariff (VOS plus) is valid.

Lines within Halle are reinforced by four taxi-bus lines during early morning/ late evening hours and the weekend.

==== Pedestrian and bicycle traffic ====
Halle is located on four supra- regional bike routes. The BahnRadRoute Teuto-Senne leads from Osnabrück via Halle and Bielefeld to Paderborn. The routes R3 from Haaksbergen to Bad Pyrmont and R45 from Schledenhausen to Hainchen lead through Hörste and Bokel. The Wellness (i.e. Fitness)- bike route Teutoburg Forest, which is laid out as a circular route of roughly 500 km, also runs through Halle. Additionally four circular routes, each approx. 20 km long, run through Halle, developing in a shamrock shape starting at the train station.

Halle has a car-free zone which is host to the weekly market and hikers find a choice of twelve signposted circular routes.

==== Air traffic ====
Bielefeld, being the next bigger town, does not have a commercial airport. There is a choice of four regional commercial airports within one to one and a half hours, thus the number of destinations that can be reached with a direct flight is quite high. The Münster/ Osnabrück- Airport lies within a 55 km distance, the Paderborn/ Lippstadt- Airport is c. 70 km away. Dortmund Airport lies within 100 km, that of Hanover roughly within a 130 km distance.

=== Companies residing in Halle ===
The most renowned employers in Halle are:

- Gerry Weber International AG, a listed fashion and lifestyle company,
- August Storck KG, a confectionery manufacturer, whose headquarters are located in Berlin nowadays, but with its origin in Halle still has its main plant there,
- Kisker-Brennereien, a liquor producer, as well as a
- Branch of Baxter International, operating in pharmaceuticals and medical technology.

=== Media ===
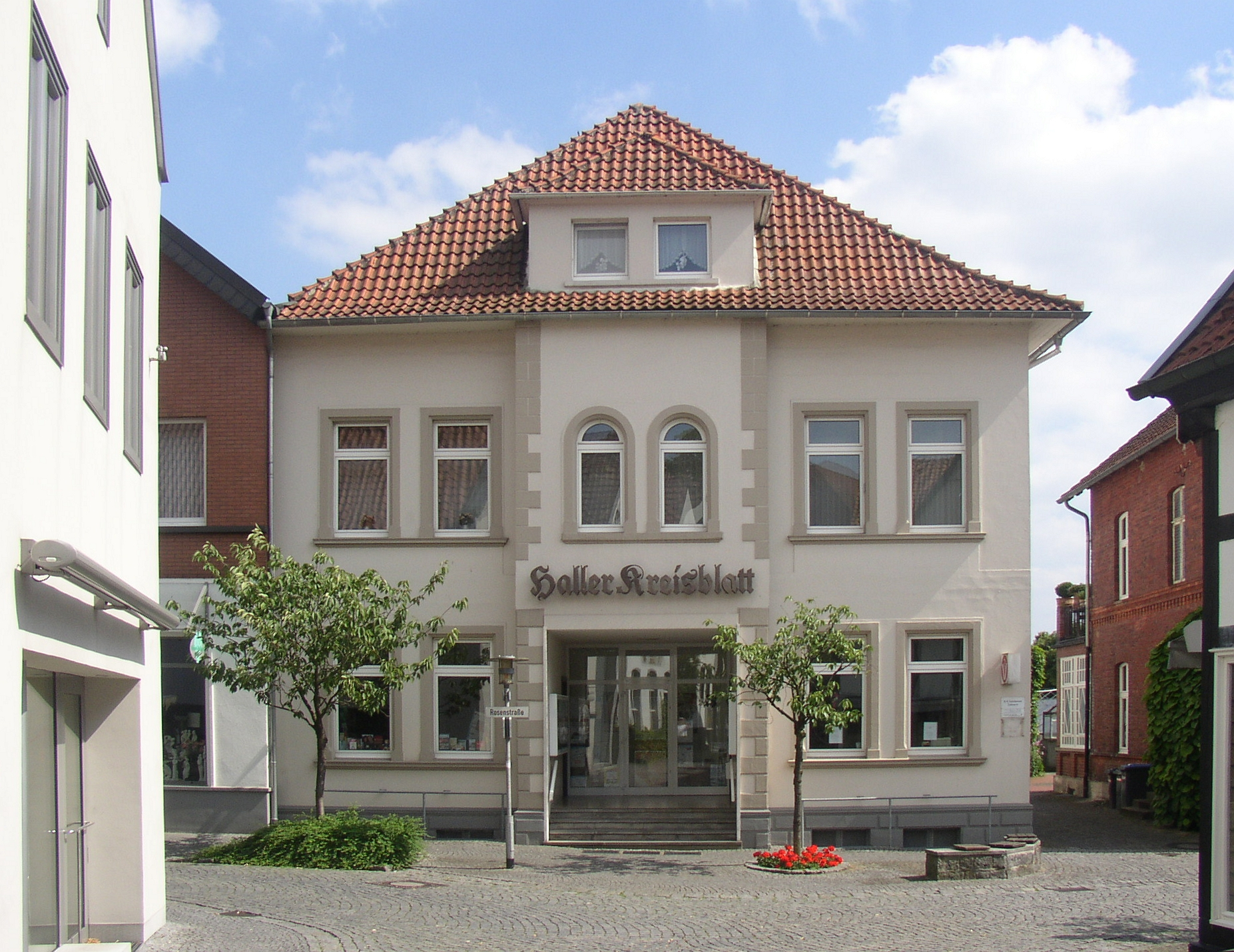
Main office of the Haller Kreisblatt newspaper

The Haller Kreisblatt, a cooperation partner of the Neue Westfälische, and a local edition of the Westfalen-Blatt are published as daily newspapers Monday through Saturday with a comparable number of copies. Both papers receive their non-local content from their head offices in Bielefeld. Both papers cover the entire former district of Halle. Additionally the free-of-charge-paper "OWL am Sonntag" (East-Westphalia on Sundays), a branch of the Westfalen-Blatt is published each Sunday. The town magazine "Haller Willem" is published monthly with a number of copies of 10,550.

Halle belongs to the reporting area of the regional studio of the WDR and also to the coverage area of Radio Gütersloh (a local radio station).

=== Public facilities ===
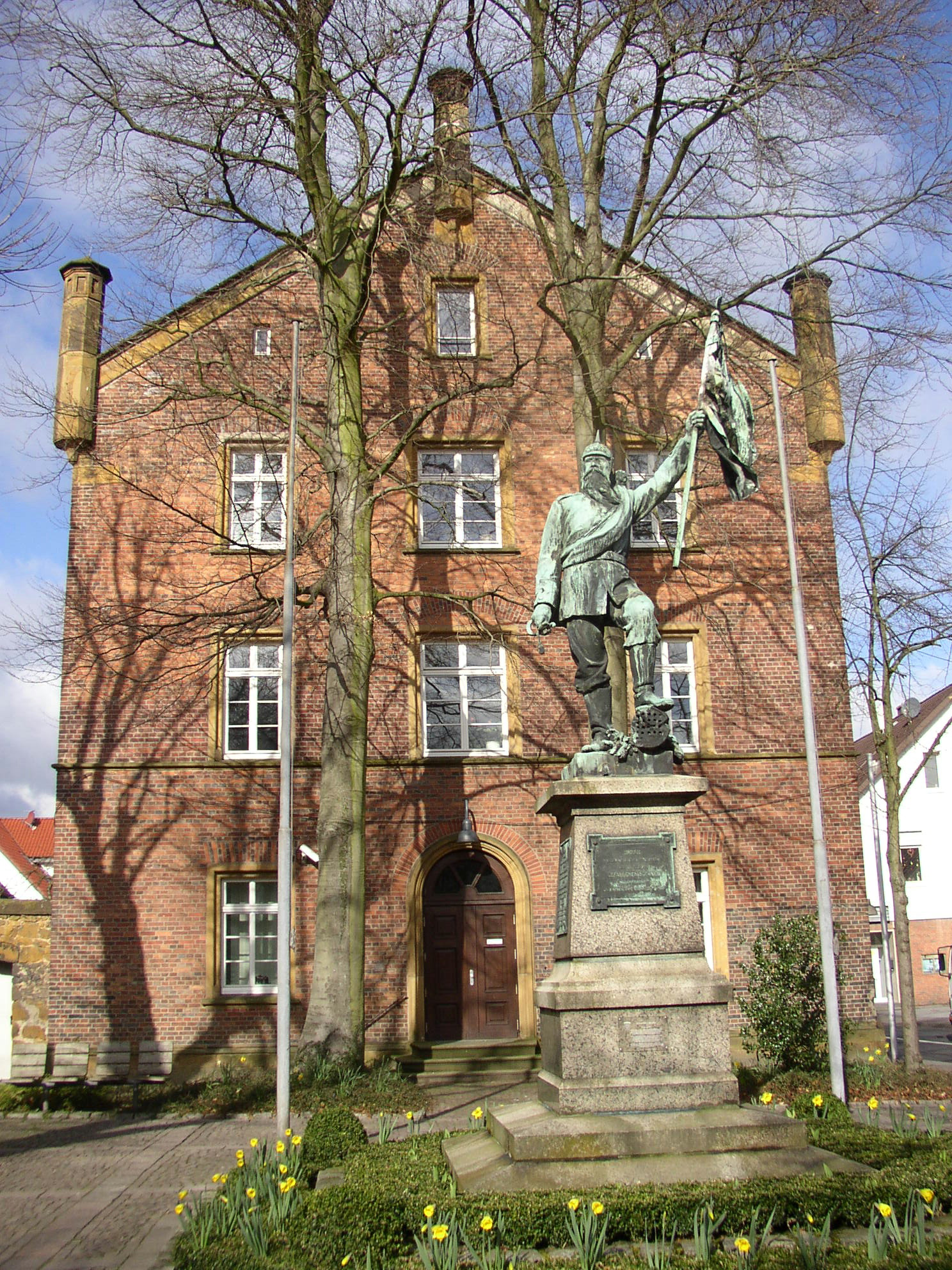
County Court with War Memorial

The town offers a number of public services for its citizens. The public library holds approx. 30.000 books. It is located in a landmarked distillery building of the Kisker- Brennereien. This building also hosts the municipal archive.

The Lindenbad is fun spa that combines indoor and outdoor swimming pools. It is operated by the Technische Werke Osning GmbH which is owned by the town.

The local hospital with 163 beds available is run by the Klinikum Ravensberg gGmbH which also operates a hospital in Versmold.

The County Court in Halle is also responsible for the former district of Halle, i.e. Borgholzhausen, Steinhagen, Versmold and Werther.

The auxiliary fire brigade of Halle is responsible for fire protection and fire fighting and deployed out of Halle, Hörste and Kölkebeck.

=== Education ===
With one exception (Comprehensive School) Halle offers all available types of schools. There are four elementary schools (Grundschule) within the borough:

- Grundschule Gartnisch
- Grundschule Lindenschule
- Grundschule Hörste
- Grundschule Künsebeck

Secondary schools are:

- Hauptschule Halle
- Realschule Halle
- Kreisgymnasium Halle
- Berufskolleg Halle (vocational school)

Hauptschule and Realschule reside on the same premises.

Additionally there is the special school

- Gerhard Hauptmann School

and for adult education the

- Folk high school, Ravensberg

Some schools of Halle are of relevance beyond Halle since they provide offers for adjacent communities, namely the Berufskolleg, the Kreisgymnasium and the Folk High School, since neighbouring communities do not always offer these school types.

In the year 2006 in Halle's schools (except Berufskolleg and Folk High School) 198 teachers taught a total of 2,933 students, about 33% thereof in elementary schools, c. 8% in Haupt- and 24.2% in Realschule, approx. 30.2% at the Kreisgymnasium, and finally some 4.2% at the special school.

== Notable people ==
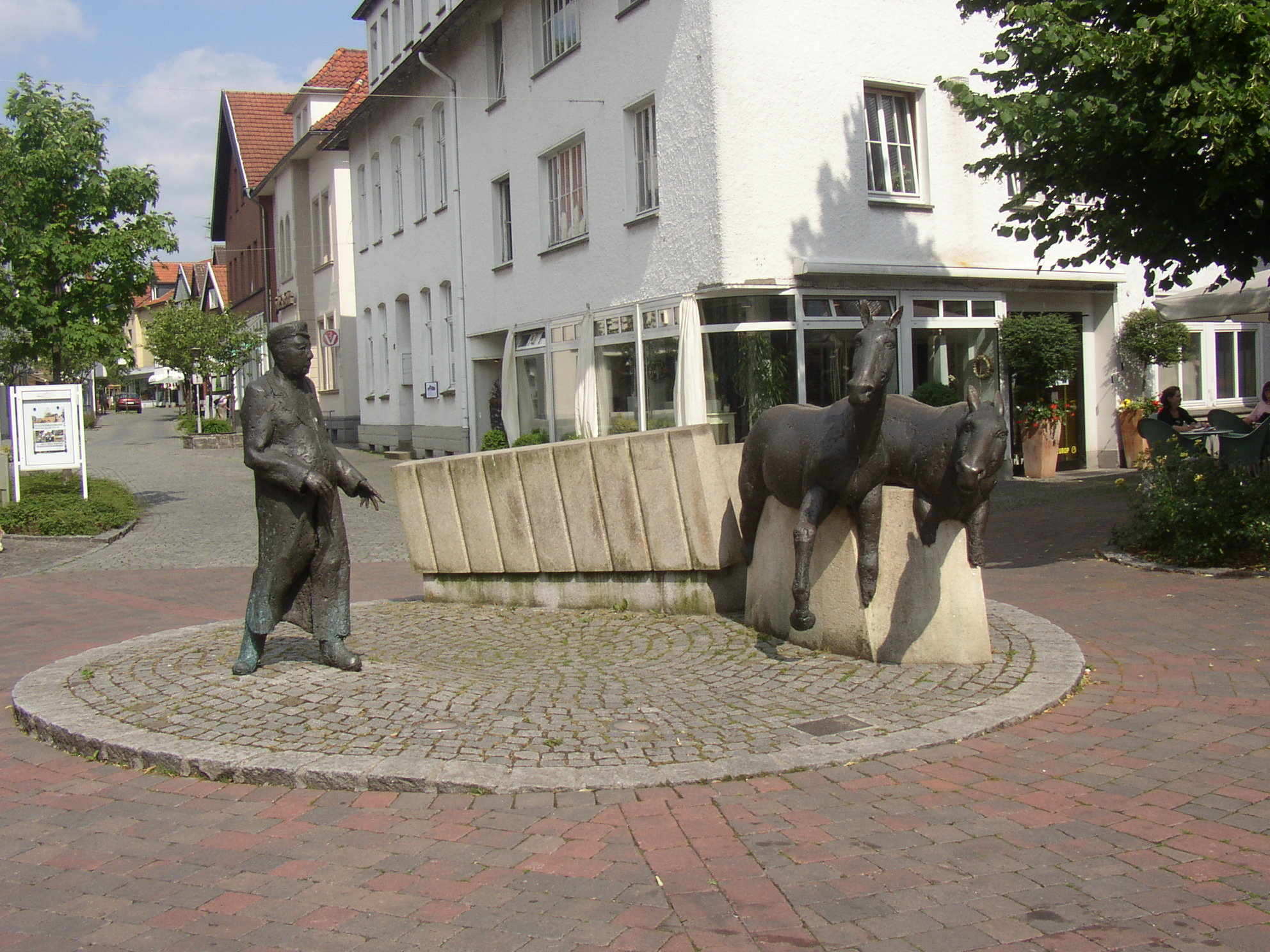
Haller Willem memorial on the Ronchin-Platz

=== Born in Halle ===
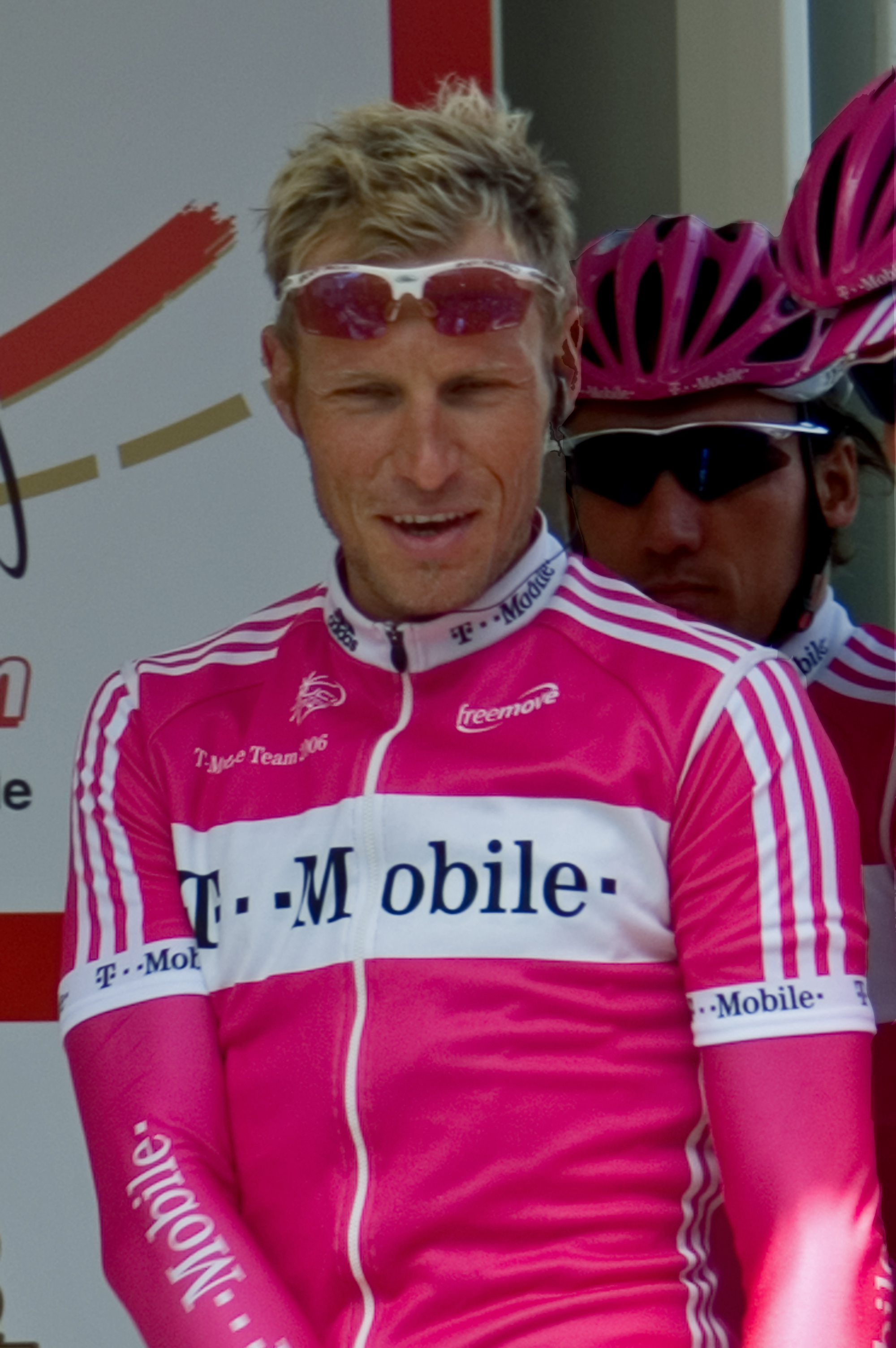
Jörg Ludewig (2006)

The following popular characters were born in Halle:

- 1803: Ferdinand Wilhelm Brune, architect of the classicism era
- 1855: Hermann Julius Kolbe, entomologist
- 1884: Margarete Windthorst, poet
- 1900: Paul Kirchhoff, German-Mexican philosopher and anthropologist
- 1939: Heiner Erke, psychologist
- 1941: Gerhard Weber, fashion designer and founder of Gerry Weber
- 1962: Sarah Wiener, television cook
- 1963: Monica Theodorescu, dressage rider
- 1975: Jörg Ludewig, German cyclist
- 1978: David Kramer, actor
- 1991: Kristijan Stojkoski, football player
- 1997: Ilia Topuria, mixed martial artist, former UFC Lightweight Champion.

=== Others connected with Halle ===
Not born in Halle, but living or working there:

- Wilhelm Wallbaum, labour union official and politician (CSP and DNVP)
- Hans Schwier, politician (SPD) and minister of cultural affairs in North Rhine-Westphalia, represented Halle in the Landtag of North Rhine-Westphalia between 1970 and 1975
- Inge Meidinger-Geise, author, lived here for 19 years
- Burghard Schloemann, Kirchenmusikdirektor and founder of the "Haller Bach-Tage"
- Gabriele Behler, later minister of cultural affairs in North Rhine-Westphalia, taught at Kreisgymnasium Halle
- Heribert Bruchhagen, football official, taught at Kreisgymnasium Halle
- Lutz von Rosenberg Lipinsky, cabaret artist, grew up in Halle
- Ingo Börchers, cabaret artist, grew up in Halle
- Martin Baumann, scientist in religious studies, grew up in Halle

== Miscellaneous ==
Due to the numerous linden trees growing in Halle the town is known as "linden town".
