= Gerhard Weber =

Gerhard Weber may refer to:

- Gerhard Weber (architect) (1909–1986), German architect
- Gerhard Weber (designer) (1941–2020), German fashion designer and entrepreneur
