= Lily Klee =

German pianist

Lily Klee (born Karoline Sophie Elisabeth Stumpf; 10 October 1876 in Munich – 22 September 1946 in Bern) was a German piano teacher, wife of painter Paul Klee, and mother to theatrical director Felix Klee.

== Life ==
Lily Stumpf was the daughter of a doctor and medical officer of health, Ludwig Stumpf (1846–1923) and his wife Marie-Anna Pohle.

Among other sources, she received her musical training from Ludwig Thuille. She met violinist and painter Paul Klee at a chamber music soirée in 1899. They became engaged in 1901, after he had had several love affairs with other women. Despite her father's opposition, she and the artist were finally married in Bern on 15 September 1906. Together they furnished a home in Munich and built Paul's studio in a garden shed. They had their first and only child, Felix Klee on 30 November 1907. While Paul raised their son, painted, and cooked, Lily generated their income by working as a piano teacher. Both Lily and Paul maintained many friendships with other artists and Lily's letters and writings provide insight into the lives of art world contemporaries.

When Paul Klee was drafted into the German Army during World War I, Lily ensured that he was assigned to a post behind the lines. During that time, she continued to earn her family's income as a chamber musician and piano teacher in Weimar. It was only after her husband's employment at the Bauhaus in 1921 that it was possible for her to focus more on her health, which had suffered over the previous years.

During the Nazi era, she arranged for her family's emigration to Switzerland in 1933. Shortly after, Paul fell ill with a disease undiagnosed at the time or for many years after his death. The letters between Lily and friends, doctors, and medical experts have allowed researchers to piece together many details about the progression of his illness.

After her husband's death in 1940, she arranged for an honorary commission to administer his artistic estate, assigning it to public collections in Switzerland.

When her son Felix Klee returned from Soviet captivity on 16 September 1946, she suffered a stroke of "joyful excitement" at his homecoming, and died a few days later on 22 September.
