= Gerry Weber =

German fashion manufacturing company and retailer

Gerry Weber International GmbH

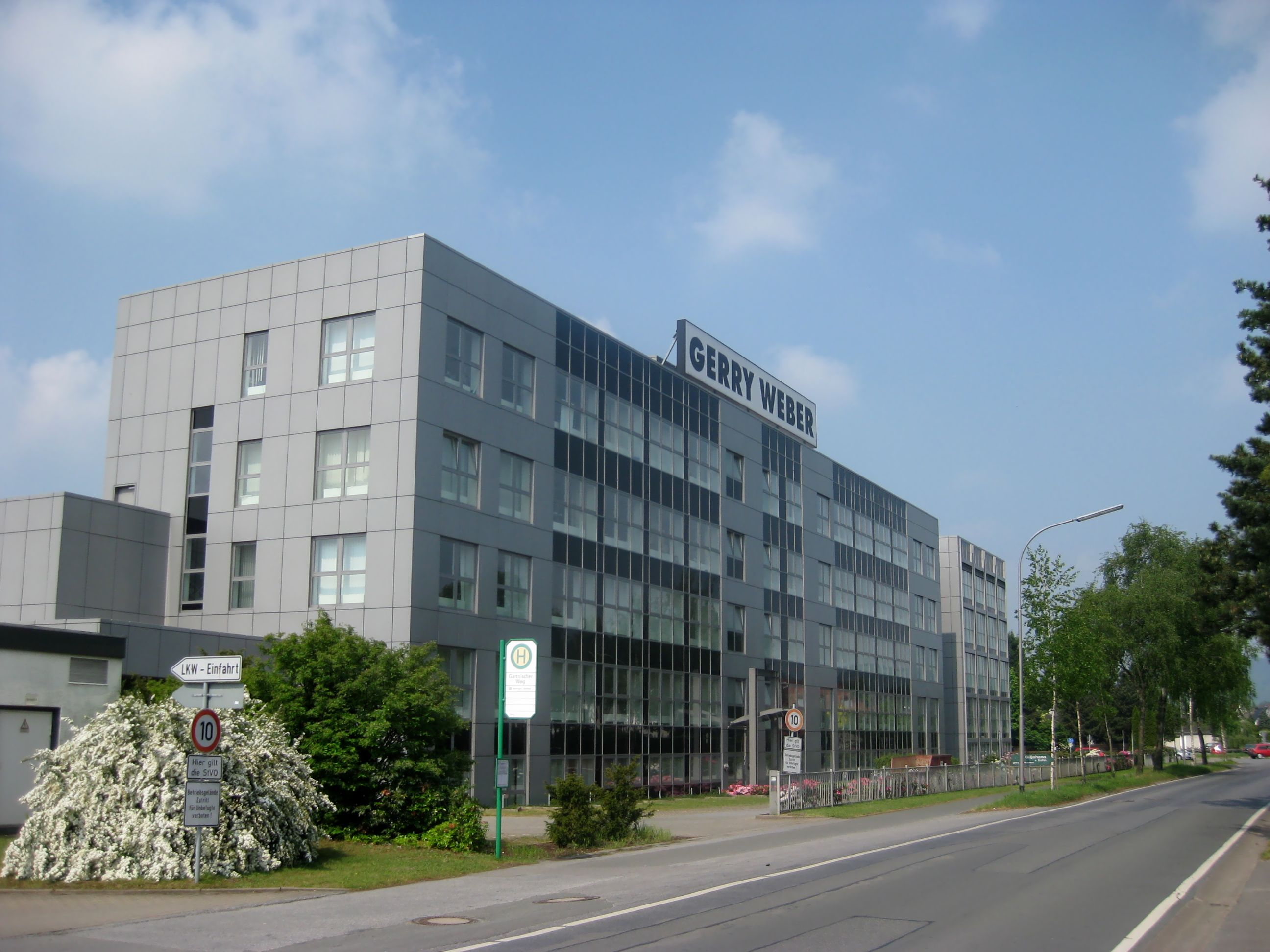
- Headquarters in Halle (Westf.)
- Formerly: Gerry Weber International AG
- Type: Private
- ISIN: DE0003304101
- Industry: Fashion; Textile and clothing industry
- Predecessor: Hatex KG
- Founded: 1 January 1973; 53 years ago
- Founder: Udo Hardieck; Gerhard Weber
- Headquarters: Halle (Westf.), Germany
- Website: gerryweber.com

Gerry Weber International GmbH (formerly, Gerry Weber International AG) is a German fashion manufacturer and retailer based in Halle (Westf.), North Rhine-Westphalia. The business which was established in 1973 as Hatex KG by Udo Hardieck and Gerhard Weber is primarily known for its ladies' collections. Shares were listed on the SDAX index, previously on the more important MDAX index of the Frankfurt Stock Exchange. The company is led by three managing directors.

In January 2019 Gerry Weber filed for insolvency; the projected closure of approximately 120 German shops affecting approximately 450 jobs (in addition to ~180 sales points in Europe) was disclosed in April 2019. In January 2020, the insolvency proceedings were discontinued upon request of the company. In March 2021, the sale of the logistics center was announced. In June 2020, the majority of insolvency creditors agreed to defer 35 percent of their claims until the end of 2023 to cushion the impact of COVID-19. In 2025, the company filed for bankruptcy for a third time as part of a plan to commence winding down its operations.

== See also ==
- Gerry Weber Stadion
