= Felix Klee =

German-Swiss art historian

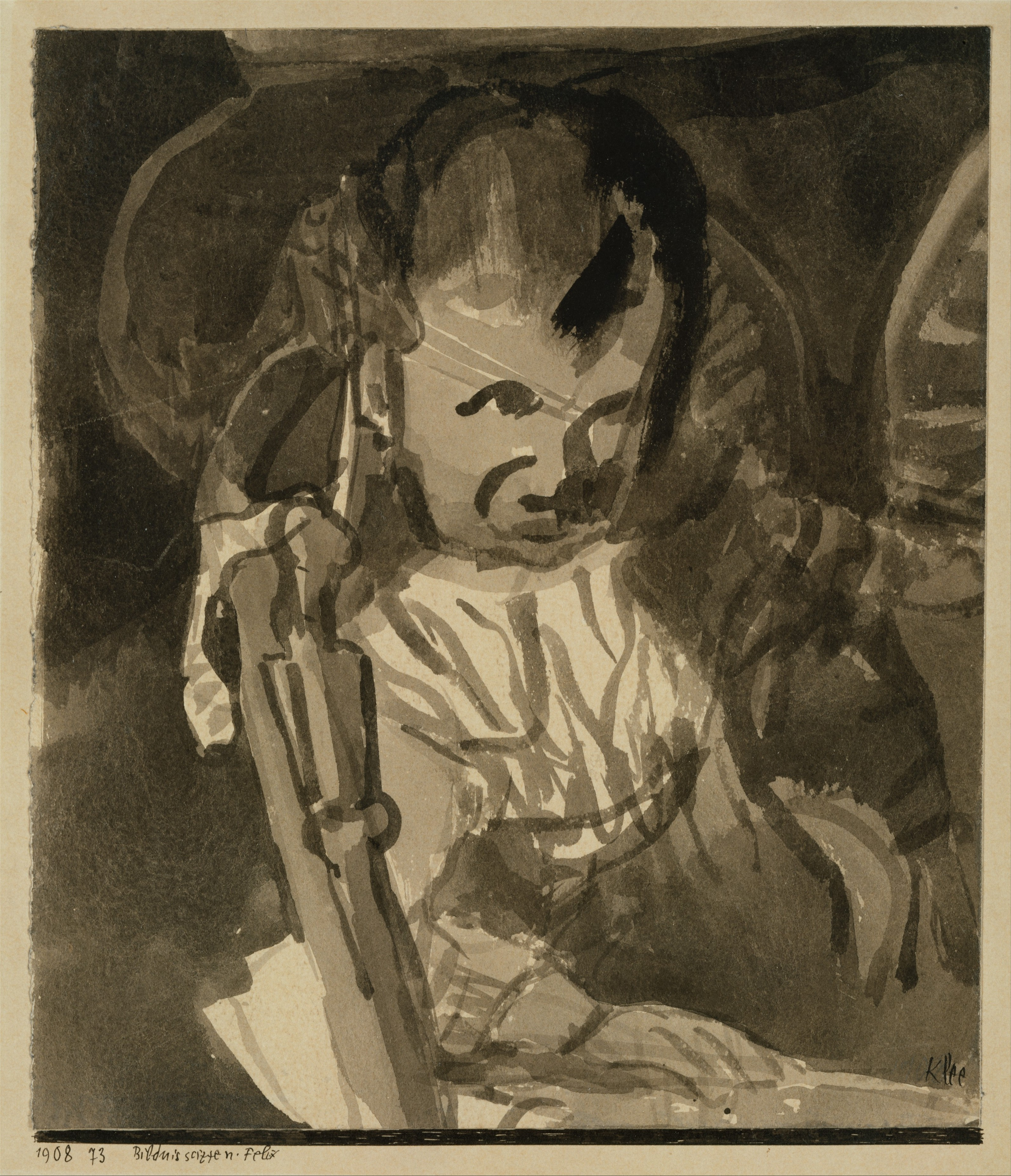
- Sketch of Felix Klee as an infant, 1908, by Paul Klee. Ink wash on paper (The Berggruen Klee Collection)
- Born: Felix Paul Klee; 30 November 1907; Munich, Germany
- Died: 13 August 1990 (aged 82); Bern, Switzerland
- Children: Alexander Klee

Felix Klee (30 November 1907 – 13 August 1990) was a German-Swiss art historian and theater director.

== Early life ==
Felix Klee was born to painter Paul Klee and pianist Lily Klee (née Stumpf) in Schwabing, Munich. Because of the demands of Lily Klee's work as a concert pianist and piano instructor, Paul Klee took on the majority of child-rearing responsibilities, overseeing Felix's physical and artistic development. Paul Klee gave Felix a puppet theater for his 9th birthday, eventually creating 50 hand puppets, of which 30 have been preserved.

In 1921, Felix and his mother joined Paul Klee in Weimar, a year after his father began teaching at the Bauhaus, relocating again in 1926 after the school's move to Dessau.

== Career ==
=== Theater ===
Discouraged by his father from pursuing a career as a painter, Felix Klee sought employment at the Friedrich Theater in Dessau, beginning work as an assistant director in 1926. Klee later worked as a stage manager for theaters in Breslau (now Wrocław), Basel, Düsseldorf, and Ulm.

=== Military service ===
Klee was drafted into the German Army in 1944, and was interned in a Soviet prisoner of war camp until September 1946.

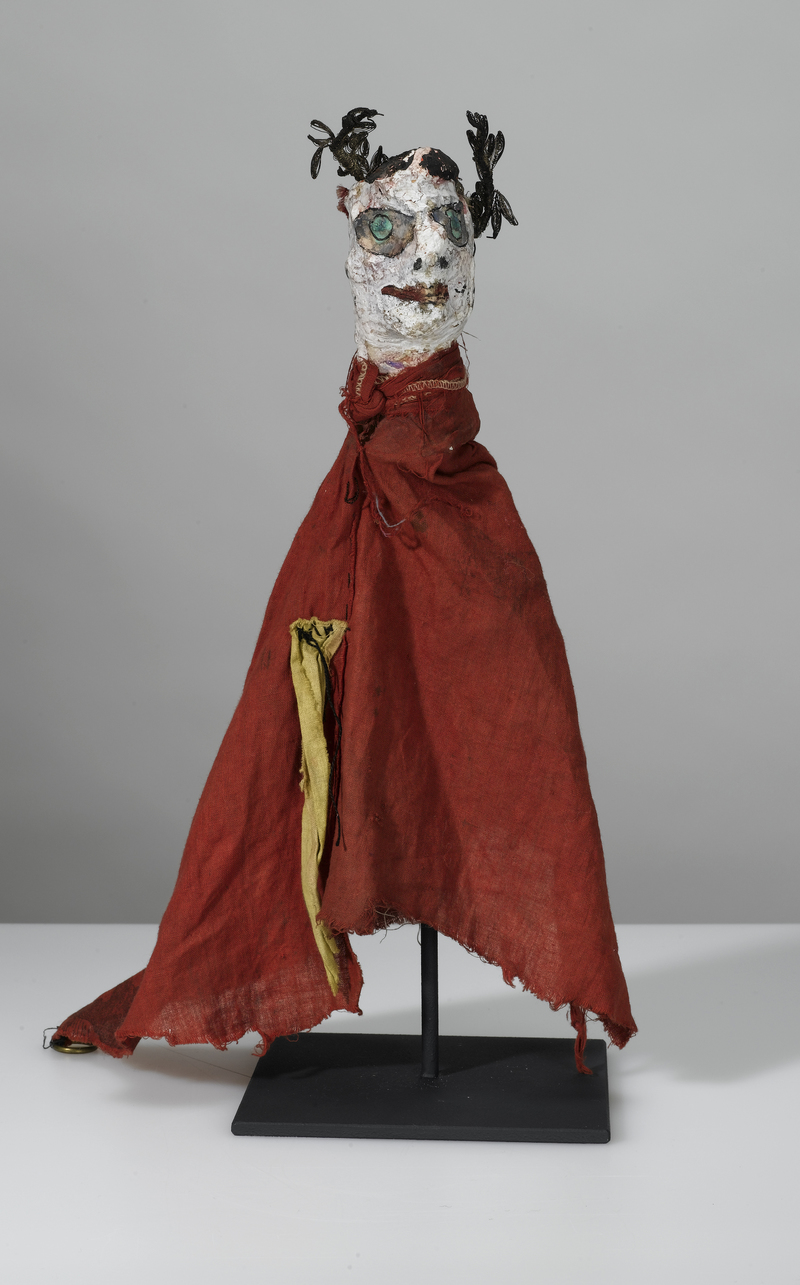
Paul Klee: Untitled (Gekrönter Dichter),1919, Zentrum Paul Klee, Bern

=== Later career ===
Klee assumed partial control of his father's estate in 1952, after four years of litigation against the Klee Society. This group of Swiss collectors had acquired the estate from Lily Klee in 1946, who believed her son to be dead and wished to avoid the estate's sale by the Swiss Government as war reparations. Felix Klee received 1,450 of the 4,000 works originally sold by Lily, with the rest being retained by the Klee Society's successor, the Paul Klee Foundation. He oversaw the publication of the diaries of Paul Klee in 1957, as well as numerous exhibitions and publications on his father's work. Klee assumed control of the Paul Klee Foundation in 1963.

== Personal life ==
Klee was married to singer Efrossina Gréschowa from 1932 until her death in 1977. The couple had one son, Alexander. Klee married Livia Meyer, daughter of Hannes Meyer, in 1980.

=== Death ===
Felix Klee died in Bern, Switzerland on August 13, 1990.
