= Gerhard Weber (designer) =

German fashion designer and entrepreneur (1941–2020)

- Born: 3 June 1941; Halle, North Rhine-Westphalia
- Died: 24 September 2020 (aged 79); Münster, North Rhine-Westphalia, Germany
- Occupations: Fashion designer; Businessman; Sports sponsor

Gerhard Weber (3 June 1941 – 24 September 2020) was a German fashion designer and entrepreneur, who founded Gerry Weber, a fashion manufacturer and retailer in Halle, North Rhine-Westphalia. He signed tennis player Steffi Graf for public relations before her international success. He was the founder of the Halle Open, a tennis tournament on the ATP Tour.

== Life and career ==
Weber was born in Halle, North Rhine-Westphalia, where his mother ran a shop selling stationery, wool and clothing. In his early life, he worked at his mother's shop and came into contact with the fashion industry. After school, he attended the Höhere Handelsschule vocational school and trained to be a textile merchant. He first worked in a textile factory, post which he opened a fashion shop in Versmold in 1965.

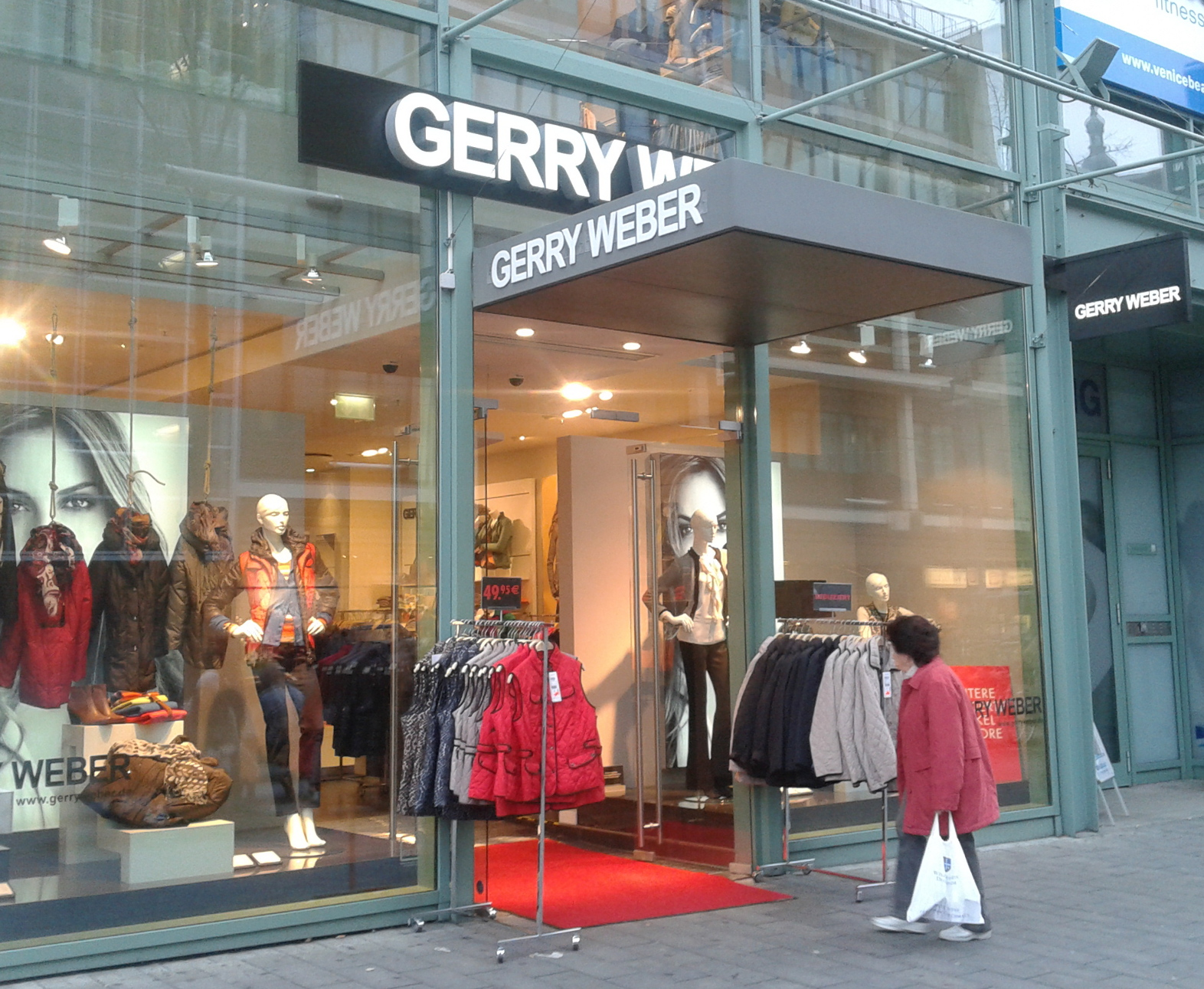
Store in Mannheim

In 1973, he founded the company Hatex AG in Halle with his friend Udo Hardieck. The company specialized in trousers for women, before branching out to full-range women's fashion in the early 1980s. The company was renamed Gerry Weber International AG in 1986, and stylized as Gerry Weber. In 1986, Weber went on to sign tennis player Steffi Graf at age 17 before her international success, to be an ambassador for the Gerry Weber brand in a move considered to be a marketing coup. The company was listed on the Frankfurt Stock Exchange in 1989, with the family as the largest stockholder.

Weber retired from his post as chief executive in 2014 and was succeeded by his son. He remained on the supervisory board until 2018. The company faced challenges from low-cost providers as well as declining interest from younger customers. In 2019, the family lost all influence on the company which was taken over by investors.

=== Sports ===
Weber, a golf player, organized an ATP Challenger Tour event in 1992, a clay court event at the TC Blau-Weiss Halle tennis club in Halle. The following year, this event became the Halle Open and was held on grass court at the Gerry Weber Stadion (now OWL Arena) that he helped build in 1992. He was also the president of the TC Blau-Weiss club, which became one of Germany's most successful tennis clubs. The Gerry Weber Stadion has been used for cultural and community events, including concerts by Elton John, Whitney Houston and Luciano Pavarotti. He also supported the soccer club Arminia Bielefeld from 2017.

=== Private life ===
Weber was married to Charlotte Weber, and the couple had two sons. Weber died on 24 September 2020 in Münster at the age of 79.

== Awards ==
Weber's awards include:

- 1996: Internationaler Mode-Marketing-Preis from Igedo
- 1997: Unternehmer des Jahres 1996 Ostwestfalen-Lippe (OWL)
- 2002: Marketingpreis of Verkaufsleiter-Club Ostwestfalen
- 2011: TextilWirtschaft magazine, award for life achievements
- 2012: Sozial-Oscar of the Gütersloh foundation
- 2013: Bester Modehändler Deutschlands
