= 2000 Gerry Weber Open – Singles =

Singles
- 2000 Gerry Weber Open

Final
- Champion: (Germany) David Prinosil
- Runner-up: (Netherlands) Richard Krajicek
- Score: 6–3, 6–2

Details
- Draw: 32
- Seeds: 8

Events
Singles	Doubles
← 1999 ·	Gerry Weber Open	· 2001 →

Nicolas Kiefer was the defending champion, but lost in the quarterfinals this year.

David Prinosil won the title, beating Richard Krajicek 6–3, 6–2 in the final.

== Seeds ==
1. (Russia) Yevgeny Kafelnikov (semifinals)
2. (Germany) Nicolas Kiefer (quarterfinals)
3. (Ecuador) Nicolás Lapentti (quarterfinals)
4. (Spain) Juan Carlos Ferrero (first round)
5. (Ukraine) Andrei Medvedev (second round)
6. (Germany) Tommy Haas (first round)
7. (France) Nicolas Escudé (quarterfinals)
8. (Australia) Patrick Rafter (second round)

== Draw ==
=== Key ===
- Q = Qualifier
- WC = Wild card
- LL = Lucky loser
- Alt = Alternate
- SE = Special exempt
- PR = Protected ranking
- ITF = ITF entry
- JE = Junior exempt
- w/o = Walkover
- r = Retired
- d = Defaulted
- SR = Special ranking

=== Finals ===
Semifinals
1	(Russia) Yevgeny Kafelnikov	4	6^{4}
WC	(Germany) David Prinosil	6	7^{7}
(United States) Michael Chang	2	1
(Netherlands) Richard Krajicek	6	6

Final
WC	(Germany) David Prinosil	6	6
(Netherlands) Richard Krajicek	3	2

=== Top half ===
First round
1	(Russia) Y Kafelnikov	6^{4}	7^{7}	6
(Spain) F Vicente	7^{7}	6^{5}	4
Q	(Spain) Ó Burrieza-Lopez	6	6
(Morocco) K Alami	3	1
WC	(Germany) C Vinck	6^{4}	6	6
Q	(Sweden) N Kulti	7^{7}	2	4
Q	(Romania) G Trifu	3	4
7	(France) N Escudé	6	6
3	(Ecuador) N Lapentti	4	7^{7}	7^{7}
WC	(Germany) M-K Goellner	6	6^{2}	6^{3}
(Spain) C Moyá	6	6
LL	(Italy) C Caratti	2	4
WC	(Germany) D Prinosil	7	6
(Sweden) T Johansson	5	1
Q	(Croatia) I Ljubičić	6	5	6
6	(Germany) T Haas	2	7	2

Second round
1	(Russia) Y Kafelnikov	6^{3}	7^{8}	6
Q	(Spain) Ó Burrieza-Lopez	7^{7}	6^{6}	3
WC	(Germany) C Vinck	4	3
7	(France) N Escudé	6	6
3	(Ecuador) N Lapentti	4	7^{8}	6
(Spain) C Moyá	6	6^{6}	4
WC	(Germany) D Prinosil	6	6^{13}	6
Q	(Croatia) I Ljubičić	4	7^{15}	4

Quarterfinals
1	(Russia) Y Kafelnikov	7^{11}	6
7	(France) N Escudé	6^{9}	3
3	(Ecuador) N Lapentti	3	6^{3}
WC	(Germany) D Prinosil	6	7^{7}

Semifinals
1	(Russia) Y Kafelnikov	4	6^{4}
WC	(Germany) D Prinosil	6	7^{7}

=== Bottom half ===
First round
5	(Ukraine) A Medvedev	6	2	6
(Germany) R Schüttler	3	6	3
(United States) M Chang	6	3	6
(Sweden) M Tillström	3	6	3
(Switzerland) R Federer	6	6
(France) A Clément	4	2
(Sweden) M Larsson	6	7^{9}
4	(Spain) JC Ferrero	3	6^{7}
8	(Australia) P Rafter	7^{7}	7^{7}
(Netherlands) S Schalken	6^{4}	6^{4}
(Netherlands) R Krajicek	6^{11}	6	6
(United States) J Tarango	7^{13}	4	4
(Norway) C Ruud	7^{7}	4	3
(Spain) A Portas	6^{3}	6	6
(France) J Golmard	1	4
2	(Germany) N Kiefer	6	6

Second round
5	(Ukraine) A Medvedev	6	6^{6}	4
(United States) M Chang	2	7^{8}	6
(Switzerland) R Federer	6	6
(Sweden) M Larsson	2	3
8	(Australia) P Rafter	7^{7}	6^{5}	2
(Netherlands) R Krajicek	6^{4}	7^{7}	6
(Spain) A Portas	7^{13}	1	2
2	(Germany) N Kiefer	6^{11}	6	6

Quarterfinals
(United States) M Chang	7	6
(Switzerland) R Federer	5	2
(Netherlands) R Krajicek	7	5	7^{7}
2	(Germany) N Kiefer	5	7	6^{3}

Semifinals
(United States) M Chang	2	1
(Netherlands) R Krajicek	6	6
