= 1994 Gerry Weber Open – Singles =

Tennis tournament

Singles
- 1994 Gerry Weber Open

Final
- Champion: (Germany) Michael Stich
- Runner-up: (Sweden) Magnus Larsson
- Score: 6–4, 4–6, 6–3

Details
- Draw: 32
- Seeds: 8

Events
Singles	Doubles
← 1993 ·	Gerry Weber Open	· 1995 →

Henri Leconte was the defending champion, but lost in the quarterfinals this year.

Michael Stich won the title, beating Magnus Larsson 6–4, 4–6, 6–3 in the final.

== Seeds ==
1. (Germany) Michael Stich (champion)
2. (Ukraine) Andrei Medvedev (first round)
3. (United States) Jim Courier (quarterfinals)
4. (France) Cédric Pioline (second round)
5. (Switzerland) Marc Rosset (second round)
6. (Russia) Yevgeny Kafelnikov (semifinals)
7. (Russia) Alexander Volkov (second round)
8. (Sweden) Magnus Larsson (final)

== Draw ==
=== Key ===
- Q = Qualifier
- WC = Wild card
- LL = Lucky loser
- Alt = Alternate
- SE = Special exempt
- PR = Protected ranking
- ITF = ITF entry
- JE = Junior exempt
- w/o = Walkover
- r = Retired
- d = Defaulted
- SR = Special ranking

=== Finals ===
Semifinals
1	(Germany) Michael Stich	6	7^{7}
(Australia) Wally Masur	3	6^{3}
6	(Russia) Yevgeny Kafelnikov	6^{3}	6^{2}
8	(Sweden) Magnus Larsson	7^{7}	7^{7}

Final
1	(Germany) Michael Stich	6	4	6
8	(Sweden) Magnus Larsson	4	6	3

=== Top half ===
First round
1	(Germany) M Stich	6	6
Q	(Venezuela) N Pereira	3	4
(Sweden) H Holm	7^{7}	6
(Czech Republic) D Rikl	6^{4}	2
(Czech Republic) D Vacek	1	6^{2}
(France) H Leconte	6	7^{7}
WC	(Germany) H Dreekmann	6	3	5
7	(Russia) A Volkov	3	6	7
4	(France) C Pioline	6	6
(Germany) J Renzenbrink	4	0
WC	(Germany) C Vinck	4	2
(Switzerland) J Hlasek	6	6
(Israel) A Mansdorf	2	5
(Australia) W Masur	6	7
Q	(Czech Republic) C Suk	4	2
5	(Switzerland) M Rosset	6	6

Second round
1	(Germany) M Stich	6	6
(Sweden) H Holm	3	4
(France) H Leconte	6	6
7	(Russia) A Volkov	0	1
4	(France) C Pioline	3	1
(Switzerland) J Hlasek	6	6
(Australia) W Masur	7	7
5	(Switzerland) M Rosset	5	5

Quarterfinals
1	(Germany) M Stich	6	7^{7}
(France) H Leconte	3	6^{4}
(Switzerland) J Hlasek	6^{5}	3
(Australia) W Masur	7^{7}	6

Semifinals
1	(Germany) M Stich	6	7^{7}
(Australia) W Masur	3	6^{3}

=== Bottom half ===
First round
6	(Russia) Y Kafelnikov	7^{7}	3	6
(France) O Delaître	6^{4}	6	3
(Germany) K Braasch	3	2
(United States) J Stark	6	6
(Germany) B Karbacher	4	6	7^{7}
WC	(France) G Forget	6	4	6^{4}
(France) R Gilbert	4	4
3	(United States) J Courier	6	6
8	(Sweden) M Larsson	6	6
(South Africa) D Adams	1	4
(Australia) R Fromberg	6	6
Q	(Germany) A Rădulescu	2	2
(United States) A Krickstein	1	6	2
Q	(United States) R Matuszewski	6	3	6
(Germany) M-K Goellner	6	7^{10}
2	(Ukraine) A Medvedev	2	6^{8}

Second round
6	(Russia) Y Kafelnikov	7^{7}	6
(United States) J Stark	6^{3}	3
(Germany) B Karbacher	3	2
3	(United States) J Courier	6	6
8	(Sweden) M Larsson	6	6
(Australia) R Fromberg	3	4
Q	(United States) R Matuszewski	4	4
(Germany) M-K Goellner	6	6

Quarterfinals
6	(Russia) Y Kafelnikov	6	6
3	(United States) J Courier	1	4
8	(Sweden) M Larsson	6	7^{7}
(Germany) M-K Goellner	4	6^{4}

Semifinals
6	(Russia) Y Kafelnikov	6^{3}	6^{2}
8	(Sweden) M Larsson	7^{7}	7^{7}
