= 2002 Gerry Weber Open – Singles =

Singles
- 2002 Gerry Weber Open

Final
- Champion: (Russia) Yevgeny Kafelnikov
- Runner-up: (Germany) Nicolas Kiefer
- Score: 2–6, 6–4, 6–4

Details
- Draw: 32 (3WC/4Q)
- Seeds: 8

Events
Singles	Doubles
← 2001 ·	Halle Open	· 2003 →

Thomas Johansson was the defending champion but lost in the quarterfinals to Kenneth Carlsen.

Yevgeny Kafelnikov won in the final 2–6, 6–4, 6–4 against Nicolas Kiefer.

== Seeds ==
A champion seed is indicated in bold text while text in italics indicates the round in which that seed was eliminated.

1. (Russia) **Yevgeny Kafelnikov (champion)**
2. (Switzerland) Roger Federer (semifinals)
3. (Sweden) Thomas Johansson (quarterfinals)
4. (United States) Pete Sampras (second round)
5. (Czech Republic) Jiří Novák (first round)
6. (Morocco) Younes El Aynaoui (first round)
7. (Spain) Carlos Moyá (first round)
8. (France) Fabrice Santoro (first round)

== Draw ==
=== Key ===
- Q = Qualifier
- WC = Wild card
- LL = Lucky loser
- Alt = Alternate
- SE = Special exempt
- PR = Protected ranking
- ITF = ITF entry
- JE = Junior exempt
- w/o = Walkover
- r = Retired
- d = Defaulted
- SR = Special ranking

=== Finals ===
Semifinals
1	(Russia) **Yevgeny Kafelnikov**	4	**6**	**6**
(Denmark) Kenneth Carlsen	**6**	3	3
**(Germany) Nicolas Kiefer**	4	**6**	**6**
2	(Switzerland) Roger Federer	**6**	4	4

Final
1	(Russia) **Yevgeny Kafelnikov**	2	**6**	**6**
(Germany) Nicolas Kiefer	**6**	4	4

=== Top half ===
First round
1	(Russia) **Y Kafelnikov**	**7^{7}**	**6**
(Sweden) J Björkman	6^{4}	2
Q	(France) **C Saulnier**	4
(Switzerland) I Heuberger	1^{r}
(Hungary) A Sávolt	4	r
(Czech Republic) **B Ulihrach**	**6**
(Germany) **R Schüttler**	**6**	**6**
5	(Czech Republic) J Novák	3	2
3	(Sweden) **T Johansson**	**7^{7}**	**6**
(Germany) A Pretzsch	6^{4}	0
(Croatia) **I Ljubičić**	5	**7^{7}**	**6**
(Italy) D Sanguinetti	**7**	6^{5}	2
(Morocco) H Arazi	1	**6**	1
(Denmark) **K Carlsen**	**6**	4	**6**
(Switzerland) **M Kratochvil**	**6**	**6**
6	(Morocco) Y El Aynaoui	2	4

Second round
1	(Russia) **Y Kafelnikov**	**6**	**7**
Q	(France) C Saulnier	3	5
(Czech Republic) **B Ulihrach**	**6**	6^{2}	**7**
(Germany) R Schüttler	2	**7^{7}**	5
3	(Sweden) **T Johansson**	**6**	**6**
(Croatia) I Ljubičić	3	4
(Denmark) **K Carlsen**	3	**6**	**6**
(Switzerland) M Kratochvil	**6**	4	4

Quarterfinals
1	(Russia) **Y Kafelnikov**	5	**6**	**6**
(Czech Republic) B Ulihrach	**7**	3	4
3	(Sweden) T Johansson	6^{3}	3
(Denmark) **K Carlsen**	**7^{7}**	**6**

Semifinals
1	(Russia) **Y Kafelnikov**	4	**6**	**6**
(Denmark) K Carlsen	**6**	3	3

=== Bottom half ===
First round
7	(Spain) C Moyá	3	3
(Austria) **S Koubek**	**6**	**6**
WC	(Germany) **A Popp**	**7**	**6**
Q	(Romania) R Sabău	5	3
(Germany) L Burgsmüller	2	2
(Germany) **N Kiefer**	**6**	**6**
(Russia) A Stoliarov	**6**	3	4
WC/4	(United States) **P Sampras**	4	**6**	**6**
8	(France) F Santoro	0	6^{5}
(Russia) **M Youzhny**	**6**	**7^{7}**
(Romania) **A Pavel**	**7^{7}**	**6**
Q	(Czech Republic) R Štěpánek	6^{5}	4
(Belgium) D Norman	6^{5}	3
Q	(Germany) **D Prinosil**	**7^{7}**	**6**
WC	(Germany) H Dreekmann	**7^{7}**	3	4
2	(Switzerland) **R Federer**	6^{5}	**6**	**6**

Second round
(Austria) S Koubek	4	2
WC	(Germany) **A Popp**	**6**	**6**
(Germany) **N Kiefer**	**6**	**6**
WC/4	(United States) P Sampras	3	4
(Russia) **M Youzhny**	**6**	**6**
(Romania) A Pavel	4	0
Q	(Germany) D Prinosil	2	4
2	(Switzerland) **R Federer**	**6**	**6**

Quarterfinals
WC	(Germany) A Popp	5	4
(Germany) **N Kiefer**	**7**	**6**
(Russia) M Youzhny	3	4
2	(Switzerland) **R Federer**	**6**	**6**

Semifinals
(Germany) **N Kiefer**	4	**6**	**6**
2	(Switzerland) R Federer	**6**	4	4

== Qualifying ==
=== Qualifying seeds ===
1. (Romania) Gabriel Trifu (qualifying competition)
2. (Czech Republic) **Radek Štěpánek (qualified)**
3. (Germany) Alexander Waske (second round)
4. (France) **Cyril Saulnier (qualified)**
5. (Argentina) Gastón Etlis (first round)
6. (Germany) **David Prinosil (qualified)**
7. (Russia) Igor Kunitsyn (first round)
8. (Canada) Frédéric Niemeyer (qualifying competition)

=== Qualifiers ===
1. (Germany) **David Prinosil**
2. (Czech Republic) **Radek Štěpánek**
3. (Romania) **Răzvan Sabău**
4. (France) **Cyril Saulnier**

=== Qualifying draw ===
==== First qualifier ====
First round
1	**(Romania) Gabriel Trifu**	**7^{7}**	**6**
(Germany) Michael Berrer	6^{2}	3
WC	(Germany) Alexander Schweizer	6^{4}	4
**(Germany) Frank Moser**	**7^{7}**	**6**
WC	(Germany) Christian Koderisch	5	3
**(France) Rodolphe Cadart**	**7**	**6**
WC	(Germany) Sebastian Linda	**6**	3	3
6	**(Germany) David Prinosil**	3	**6**	**6**

Second round
1	**(Romania) Gabriel Trifu**	**6**	**6**
(Germany) Frank Moser	4	2
(France) Rodolphe Cadart	4	1
6	**(Germany) David Prinosil**	**6**	**6**

Qualifying competition
1	(Romania) Gabriel Trifu	**6**	1	4
6	**(Germany) David Prinosil**	3	**6**	**6**

==== Second qualifier ====
First round
2	**(Czech Republic) Radek Štěpánek**	**6**	6^{3}	**6**
(Germany) Franz Stauder	3	**7^{7}**	1
(Germany) Benjamin Kohllöffel	3	**7**	3
**(Germany) Karsten Braasch**	**6**	5	**6**
**(Argentina) Martín Rodríguez**	**6**	**6**
(Australia) Dejan Petrović	4	2
(Spain) Daniel Lencina-Ribes	3	4
8	**(Canada) Frédéric Niemeyer**	**6**	**6**

Second round
2	**(Czech Republic) Radek Štěpánek**	**6**	**6**
(Germany) Karsten Braasch	1	1
(Argentina) Martín Rodríguez	3	4
8	**(Canada) Frédéric Niemeyer**	**6**	**6**

Qualifying competition
2	**(Czech Republic) Radek Štěpánek**	4	**6**	**7**
8	(Canada) Frédéric Niemeyer	**6**	3	5

==== Third qualifier ====
First round
3	**(Germany) Alexander Waske**	**6**	6^{7}	**6**
WC	(Germany) Andre Begemann	3	**7^{9}**	2
(Australia) David McNamara	1	2
**(Romania) Răzvan Sabău**	**6**	**6**
(Australia) Paul Baccanello	2	**6**	2
**(Russia) Kirill Ivanov-Smolensky**	**6**	3	**6**
**(Switzerland) Yves Allegro**	4	**6**	**6**
5	(Argentina) Gastón Etlis	**6**	1	4

Second round
3	(Germany) Alexander Waske	6^{6}	2
**(Romania) Răzvan Sabău**	**7^{8}**	**6**
(Russia) Kirill Ivanov-Smolensky	4	4
**(Switzerland) Yves Allegro**	**6**	**6**

Qualifying competition
**(Romania) Răzvan Sabău**	**6**	**6**
(Switzerland) Yves Allegro	2	4

==== Fourth qualifier ====
First round
4	**(France) Cyril Saulnier**	**6**	**7^{8}**
(Federal Republic of Yugoslavia) Nenad Zimonjić	3	6^{6}
(Germany) Alex Rădulescu	4	3
**(Ecuador) Giovanni Lapentti**	**6**	**6**
**(Switzerland) Marco Chiudinelli**	**7^{7}**	1	**6**
(Sweden) Fredrik Lovén	6^{5}	**6**	4
**(United States) Kristian Capalik**	**6**	**6**
7	(Russia) Igor Kunitsyn	2	3

Second round
4	**(France) Cyril Saulnier**	2	**6**	**6**
(Ecuador) Giovanni Lapentti	**6**	4	4
(Switzerland) Marco Chiudinelli	6^{5}	1
**(United States) Kristian Capalik**	**7^{7}**	**6**

Qualifying competition
4	**(France) Cyril Saulnier**	**7^{7}**	**6**
(United States) Kristian Capalik	6^{3}	4
