= 2001 Gerry Weber Open =

- Date: 11–17 June
- Edition: 9th
- Category: International Series
- Draw: 32S / 16D
- Prize money: $975,000
- Surface: Grass / outdoor
- Location: Halle, Germany
- Venue: Gerry Weber Stadion

Champions

Singles
- (Sweden) Thomas Johansson

Doubles
- (Canada) Daniel Nestor / (Australia) Sandon Stolle
← 2000 ·	Gerry Weber Open	· 2002 →

The 2001 Gerry Weber Open was a men's tennis tournament played on grass courts at the Gerry Weber Stadion in Halle, North Rhine-Westphalia in Germany and was part of the International Series of the 2001 ATP Tour. It was the ninth edition of the tournament and took place from 11 June through 17 June 2001. Seventh-seeded Thomas Johansson won the singles title.

== Finals ==
=== Singles ===
(Sweden) Thomas Johansson defeated (France) Fabrice Santoro 6–3, 6–7^{(5–7)}, 6–2

- It was Johansson's 1st singles title of the year and the 5th of his career.

=== Doubles ===
(Canada) Daniel Nestor / (Australia) Sandon Stolle defeated (Belarus) Max Mirnyi / (Australia) Patrick Rafter 6–4, 6–7^{(5–7)}, 6–1

- It was Nestor's 3rd title of the year and the 19th of his career. It was Stolle's 3rd title of the year and the 19th of his career.
