= 1999 Gerry Weber Open – Singles =

Singles
- 1999 Gerry Weber Open

Final
- Champion: (Germany) Nicolas Kiefer
- Runner-up: (Sweden) Nicklas Kulti
- Score: 6–3, 6–2

Events
Singles	Doubles
← 1998 ·	Gerry Weber Open	· 2000 →

Yevgeny Kafelnikov was the defending champion, but did not take part in 1999.

== Seeds ==
1. (Australia) Patrick Rafter (second round)
2. (Spain) Carlos Moyá (semifinals)
3. (Netherlands) Richard Krajicek (first round)
4. (United States) ~~Andre Agassi~~ (withdrew)
5. (Spain) Felix Mantilla (first round)
6. (Germany) Tommy Haas (quarterfinals)
7. (Germany) Nicolas Kiefer (champion)
8. (France) Jérôme Golmard (first round)

== Draw ==
=== Key ===
- Q = Qualifier
- WC = Wild card
- LL = Lucky loser
- Alt = Alternate
- SE = Special exempt
- PR = Protected ranking
- ITF = ITF entry
- JE = Junior exempt
- w/o = Walkover
- r = Retired
- d = Defaulted
- SR = Special ranking

=== Finals ===
Semifinals
7	(Germany) Nicolas Kiefer	6	6
(Czech Republic) Daniel Vacek	4	3
LL	(Sweden) Nicklas Kulti	6	6
2	(Spain) Carlos Moyá	3	4

Final
7	(Germany) Nicolas Kiefer	6	6
LL	(Sweden) Nicklas Kulti	3	2

=== Top half ===
First round
1	(Australia) P Rafter	6	7
(Australia) A Ilie	3	5
(Netherlands) J Siemerink	4	6	6
(Netherlands) P Haarhuis	6	3	4
Q	(United States) R Reneberg	6	6
(Switzerland) M Rosset	3	4
(Germany) R Schüttler	4	1
7	(Germany) N Kiefer	6	6
3	(Netherlands) R Krajicek	6^{6}	4
(Czech Republic) D Vacek	7^{8}	6
(Germany) B Karbacher	2	4
(Czech Republic) J Novák	6	6
(Sweden) J Björkman	6	6
(Slovakia) J Krošlák	4	3
(Italy) G Pozzi	6	6
5	(Spain) F Mantilla	2	2

Second round
1	(Australia) P Rafter	4	6	6^{17}
(Netherlands) J Siemerink	6	3	7^{19}
(United States) R Reneberg	1	4
7	(Germany) N Kiefer	6	6
(Czech Republic) D Vacek	w/o
(Czech Republic) J Novák
(Sweden) J Björkman	6	3	3
(Italy) G Pozzi	2	6	6

Quarterfinals
(Netherlands) J Siemerink	4	2
7	(Germany) N Kiefer	6	6
(Czech Republic) D Vacek	6	6
(Italy) G Pozzi	4	3

Semifinals
7	(Germany) N Kiefer	6	6
(Czech Republic) D Vacek	4	3

=== Bottom half ===
First round
6	(Germany) T Haas	6	7
(France) G Raoux	4	5
SE	(Ukraine) A Medvedev	1	7	4
WC	(Germany) H Dreekmann	6	5	6
Q	(United States) J Stark	3	4
(United States) J Gimelstob	6	6
(Netherlands) J van Lottum	1	1
LL	(Sweden) N Kulti	6	6
8	(France) J Golmard	5	0
(Netherlands) S Schalken	7	6
Q	(Spain) O Burrieza	6^{4}	7	7^{7}
(Sweden) M Larsson	7^{7}	5	6^{5}
(Germany) D Prinosil	6	7
Q	(Zimbabwe) K Ullyett	3	5
(Sweden) M Gustafsson	3	2
2	(Spain) C Moyá	6	6

Second round
6	(Germany) T Haas	6	7^{7}
WC	(Germany) H Dreekmann	4	6^{4}
(United States) J Gimelstob	4	4
LL	(Sweden) N Kulti	6	6
(Netherlands) S Schalken	7^{7}	6
Q	(Spain) O Burrieza	6^{2}	2
(Germany) D Prinosil	4	4
2	(Spain) C Moyá	6	6

Quarterfinals
6	(Germany) T Haas	6^{6}	7	3
LL	(Sweden) N Kulti	7^{8}	5	6
(Netherlands) S Schalken	3	6^{5}
2	(Spain) C Moyá	6	7^{7}

Semifinals
LL	(Sweden) N Kulti	6	6
2	(Spain) C Moyá	3	4
