= 1997 Gerry Weber Open =

Tennis tournament in Germany

- Date: 9–15 June
- Edition: 5th
- Category: World Series
- Draw: 32S / 16D
- Prize money: $875,000
- Surface: Grass / outdoors
- Location: Halle, Germany
- Venue: Gerry Weber Stadion

Champions

Singles
- (Russia) Yevgeny Kafelnikov

Doubles
- (Germany) Karsten Braasch / (Germany) Michael Stich
- Gerry Weber Open

The 1997 Gerry Weber Open was a men's tennis tournament played on outdoor grass courts. It was the 5th edition of the Gerry Weber Open, and was part of the World Series of the 1997 ATP Tour. It took place at the Gerry Weber Stadion in Halle, North Rhine-Westphalia, Germany, from 9 June through 15 June 1997. First-seeded Yevgeny Kafelnikov won the singles title.

== Finals ==
=== Singles ===
(Russia) Yevgeny Kafelnikov defeated (Czech Republic) Petr Korda 7–6, 6–7, 7–6

- It was Kafelnikov's 1st singles title of the year and the 12th of his career.

=== Doubles ===
(Germany) Karsten Braasch / (Germany) Michael Stich defeated (South Africa) David Adams / (South Africa) Marius Barnard 7–6, 6–3

- It was Braasch's first title of his career. It was Stich's first title of the year and the 28th of his career.
