= 1998 Gerry Weber Open – Singles =

Singles
- 1998 Gerry Weber Open

Final
- Champion: (Russia) Yevgeny Kafelnikov
- Runner-up: (Sweden) Magnus Larsson
- Score: 6–4, 6–4

Events
Singles	Doubles
← 1997 ·	Gerry Weber Open	· 1999 →

Yevgeny Kafelnikov was the defending champion and defended his title with 6–4, 6–4 against Magnus Larsson.

== Seeds ==
1. (Czech Republic) Petr Korda (second round)
2. (Russia) Yevgeny Kafelnikov (champion)
3. (Netherlands) Richard Krajicek (Quarterfinal)
4. (Spain) Carlos Moyá (second round)
5. (Spain) Alex Corretja (first round)
6. (Austria) Thomas Muster (first round)
7. (Germany) Nicolas Kiefer (first round)
8. (Sweden) Magnus Norman (Quarterfinal)

== Draw ==
=== Key ===
- Q = Qualifier
- WC = Wild card
- LL = Lucky loser
- Alt = Alternate
- SE = Special exempt
- PR = Protected ranking
- ITF = ITF entry
- JE = Junior exempt
- w/o = Walkover
- r = Retired
- d = Defaulted
- SR = Special ranking

=== Finals ===
Semifinals
(Netherlands) Paul Haarhuis	6^{5}	2
(Sweden) Magnus Larsson	7^{7}	6
(Sweden) Thomas Johansson	6^{4}	7^{7}	3
2	(Russia) Yevgeny Kafelnikov	7^{7}	6^{5}	6

Final
(Sweden) Magnus Larsson	4	4
2	(Russia) Yevgeny Kafelnikov	6	6

=== Top half ===
First round
1	(Czech Republic) P Korda	6	7^{7}
(Germany) MK Goellner	1	6^{5}
Q	(Germany) C Vinck	6	1	2
(Netherlands) P Haarhuis	2	6	6
(Italy) G Pozzi	6	6
(Netherlands) S Schalken	4	4
(Australia) R Fromberg	2	6	6
7	(Germany) N Kiefer	6	4	4
3	(Netherlands) R Krajicek	5	6	6
(United States) V Spadea	7	2	2
(Belgium) F Dewulf	3	4
(Germany) T Haas	6	6
(United States) S Campbell	1	7^{7}	6
WC	(Germany) J Knippschild	6	6^{4}	3
(Sweden) M Larsson	6	6
6	(Austria) T Muster	3	2

Second round
1	(Czech Republic) P Korda	6^{4}	4
(Netherlands) P Haarhuis	7^{7}	6
(Italy) G Pozzi	6	7^{7}
(Australia) R Fromberg	1	6^{1}
3	(Netherlands) R Krajicek	3	6	6
(Germany) T Haas	6	4	1
(United States) S Campbell	0	3
(Sweden) M Larsson	6	6

Quarterfinals
(Netherlands) P Haarhuis	6	7^{7}
(Italy) G Pozzi	3	6^{4}
3	(Netherlands) R Krajicek	4	2
(Sweden) M Larsson	6	6

Semifinals
(Netherlands) P Haarhuis	6^{5}	2
(Sweden) M Larsson	7^{7}	6

=== Bottom half ===
First round
5	(Spain) À Corretja	2	5
(France) N Escudé	6	7
(United States) J Tarango	4	7^{7}	5
(Sweden) T Johansson	6	6^{1}	7
(Germany) B Becker	3	7	6^{9}
WC	(Germany) H Dreekmann	6	5	7^{11}
(France) G Raoux	4	4
4	(Spain) C Moyá	6	6
8	(Sweden) M Norman	3	6	6
Q	(Netherlands) R Sluiter	6	2	1
Q	(Germany) F Stauder	6	2	6^{6}
(Netherlands) J Siemerink	4	6	7^{8}
WC	(Germany) D Prinosil	7^{7}	6
Q	(Romania) G Trifu	6^{2}	3
(Ukraine) A Medvedev	6	5	1
2	(Russia) Y Kafelnikov	1	7	6

Second round
(France) N Escudé
(Sweden) T Johansson	w/o
WC	(Germany) H Dreekmann	7	6
4	(Spain) C Moyá	5	3
8	(Sweden) M Norman	6	5	6
(Netherlands) J Siemerink	4	7	3
WC	(Germany) D Prinosil	4	3
2	(Russia) Y Kafelnikov	6	6

Quarterfinals
(Sweden) T Johansson	3	6	6
WC	(Germany) H Dreekmann	6	1	4
8	(Sweden) M Norman	6^{1}	2
2	(Russia) Y Kafelnikov	7^{7}	6

Semifinals
(Sweden) T Johansson	6^{4}	7^{7}	3
2	(Russia) Y Kafelnikov	7^{7}	6^{5}	6
