= 1994 Gerry Weber Open =

- Date: 13–20 June
- Edition: 2nd
- Category: World Series
- Draw: 32S / 16D
- Prize money: $500,000
- Surface: Grass / outdoor
- Location: Halle, Germany
- Venue: Gerry Weber Stadion

Champions

Singles
- (Germany) Michael Stich

Doubles
- (France) Olivier Delaître / (France) Guy Forget
- Gerry Weber Open

The 1994 Gerry Weber Open was a men's tennis tournament played on outdoor grass courts. It was the 2nd edition of the Gerry Weber Open, and was part of the World Series of the 1994 ATP Tour. It took place at the Gerry Weber Stadion in Halle, North Rhine-Westphalia, Germany, from 13 June until 20 June 1994. First-seeded Michael Stich won the singles title.

== Finals ==
=== Singles ===
(Germany) Michael Stich defeated (Sweden) Magnus Larsson 6–4, 4–6, 6–3

- It was Stich's 3rd singles title of the year and the 16th of his career.

=== Doubles ===
(France) Olivier Delaître / (France) Guy Forget defeated (France) Henri Leconte / (South Africa) Gary Muller 6–4, 6–7, 6–4

- It was Delaitre's 2nd title of the year and the 4th of his career. It was Forget's first title of the year and the 35th of his career.
