= 1994 Gerry Weber Open – Doubles =

Doubles
- 1994 Gerry Weber Open

Final
- Champions: (France) Olivier Delaître (France) Guy Forget
- Runners-up: (France) Henri Leconte (South Africa) Gary Muller
- Score: 6–4, 6–7, 6–4

Details
- Draw: 16
- Seeds: 4

Events
Singles	Doubles
← 1993 ·	Gerry Weber Open	· 1995 →

Petr Korda and Cyril Suk were the defending champions, but Korda did not participate this year. Suk partnered Daniel Vacek, losing in the quarterfinals.

Olivier Delaître and Guy Forget won the title, defeating Henri Leconte and Gary Muller 6–4, 6–7, 6–4 in the final.

== Seeds ==
1. (Czech Republic) Cyril Suk / (Czech Republic) Daniel Vacek (quarterfinals)
2. (Sweden) Henrik Holm / (Sweden) Anders Järryd (quarterfinals, withdrew)
3. (Russia) Yevgeny Kafelnikov / (Czech Republic) David Rikl (semifinals)
4. (United States) Scott Melville / (South Africa) Piet Norval (first round)

== Draw ==
=== Key ===
- Q = Qualifier
- WC = Wild card
- LL = Lucky loser
- Alt = Alternate
- SE = Special exempt
- PR = Protected ranking
- ITF = ITF entry
- JE = Junior exempt
- w/o = Walkover
- r = Retired
- d = Defaulted
- SR = Special ranking

=== Draw ===
First round
1	(Czech Republic) C Suk (Czech Republic) D Vacek	6	6	7
(United States) M Bauer (Germany) M-K Goellner	7	4	6
(France) O Delaître (France) G Forget	7	3	6
(United States) S Cannon (Australia) D Macpherson	6	6	3
3	(Russia) Y Kafelnikov (Czech Republic) D Rikl	7	7
(Sweden) R Bergh (South Africa) B Talbot	6	6
(South Africa) J-L de Jager (South Africa) S Kruger	7	4	4
(Germany) D Prinosil (Germany) U Riglewski	6	6	6
(Italy) D Nargiso (Venezuela) N Pereira	6	7
WC	(Germany) H Dreekmann (Germany) J Renzenbrink	4	5
WC	(France) H Leconte (South Africa) G Muller	6	6	6
4	(United States) S Melville (South Africa) P Norval	7	3	3
Q	(Netherlands) S Groen (Switzerland) M Rosset	6	6
(Sweden) M Larsson (United States) G Van Emburgh	4	3
(South Africa) D Adams (Switzerland) J Hlasek	4	4
2	(Sweden) H Holm (Sweden) A Järryd	6	6

Quarterfinals
1	(Czech Republic) C Suk (Czech Republic) D Vacek	4	6
(France) O Delaître (France) G Forget	6	7
3	(Russia) Y Kafelnikov (Czech Republic) D Rikl	6	6
(Germany) D Prinosil (Germany) U Riglewski	3	4
(Italy) D Nargiso (Venezuela) N Pereira
WC	(France) H Leconte (South Africa) G Muller	w/o
Q	(Netherlands) S Groen (Switzerland) M Rosset	w/o
2	(Sweden) H Holm (Sweden) A Järryd

Semifinals
(France) O Delaître (France) G Forget	3	7	7
3	(Russia) Y Kafelnikov (Czech Republic) D Rikl	6	5	6
WC	(France) H Leconte (South Africa) G Muller	6	7
Q	(Netherlands) S Groen (Switzerland) M Rosset	3	6

Final
(France) O Delaître (France) G Forget	6	6	6
WC	(France) H Leconte (South Africa) G Muller	4	7	4
