= 1996 Gerry Weber Open – Doubles =

Doubles
- 1996 Gerry Weber Open

Final
- Champions: (Zimbabwe) Byron Black (Canada) Grant Connell
- Runners-up: (Russia) Yevgeny Kafelnikov (Czech Republic) Daniel Vacek
- Score: 6–1, 7–5

Details
- Draw: 16
- Seeds: 4

Events
Singles	Doubles
← 1995 ·	Gerry Weber Open	· 1997 →

Jacco Eltingh and Paul Haarhuis were the defending champions but lost in the semifinals to Byron Black and Grant Connell.

Black and Connell won in the final 6–1, 7–5 against Yevgeny Kafelnikov and Daniel Vacek.

== Seeds ==
Champion seeds are indicated in bold text while text in italics indicates the round in which those seeds were eliminated.

1. (Russia) Yevgeny Kafelnikov / (Czech Republic) Daniel Vacek (final)
2. (Zimbabwe) **Byron Black** / (Canada) **Grant Connell (champions)**
3. (Netherlands) Jacco Eltingh / (Netherlands) Paul Haarhuis (semifinals)
4. (Belgium) Libor Pimek / (South Africa) Byron Talbot (first round)

== Draw ==
=== Key ===
- Q = Qualifier
- WC = Wild card
- LL = Lucky loser
- Alt = Alternate
- ITF = ITF entry
- PR = Protected ranking
- SR = Special ranking
- SE = Special exempt
- JE = Junior exempt
- JR = Junior Accelerator Programme entrant
- CO = College Accelerator Programme entrant
- NG = Next Gen Accelerator Program entrant
- w/o = Walkover
- r = Retired
- d = Defaulted

First round
1	(Russia) **Y Kafelnikov** (Czech Republic) **D Vacek**	**7**	**7**
(Italy) A Gaudenzi (Austria) T Muster	6	6
(Switzerland) **J Hlasek** (Germany) **D Prinosil**	**6**	**6**
(South Africa) J-L de Jager (New Zealand) B Steven	4	4
4	(Belgium) L Pimek (South Africa) B Talbot	6	4
(Sweden) **J Björkman** (Sweden) **N Kulti**	**7**	**6**
WC	(Germany) H Dreekmann (Netherlands) S Schalken	**6**	4	6
(United States) **R Reneberg** (Czech Republic) **C Suk**	2	**6**	**7**
WC	(Sweden) T Enqvist (Sweden) M Larsson	**7**	1	4
(France) **A Boetsch** (Switzerland) **M Rosset**	6	**6**	**6**
Q	(Czech Republic) V Flégl (Germany) B Karbacher	6	2
3	(Netherlands) **J Eltingh** (Netherlands) **P Haarhuis**	**7**	**6**
(Spain) T Carbonell (Australia) A Florent	**7**	3	6
(France) **J-P Fleurian** (France) **G Raoux**	5	**6**	**7**
WC	(Australia) P Cash (Germany) F Stauder	2	5
2	(Zimbabwe) **B Black** (Canada) **G Connell**	**6**	**7**

Quarterfinals
1	(Russia) **Y Kafelnikov** (Czech Republic) **D Vacek**	**6**	**6**
(Switzerland) J Hlasek (Germany) D Prinosil	4	3
(Sweden) **J Björkman** (Sweden) **N Kulti**	**7**	6	**6**
(United States) R Reneberg (Czech Republic) C Suk	6	**7**	4
(France) A Boetsch (Switzerland) M Rosset	4	4
3	(Netherlands) **J Eltingh** (Netherlands) **P Haarhuis**	**6**	**6**
(France) J-P Fleurian (France) G Raoux	6	5
2	(Zimbabwe) **B Black** (Canada) **G Connell**	**7**	**7**

Semifinals
1	(Russia) **Y Kafelnikov** (Czech Republic) **D Vacek**	**7**	6	**6**
(Sweden) J Björkman (Sweden) N Kulti	5	**7**	4
3	(Netherlands) J Eltingh (Netherlands) P Haarhuis
2	(Zimbabwe) **B Black** (Canada) **G Connell**	w/o

Final
1	(Russia) Y Kafelnikov (Czech Republic) D Vacek	1	5
2	(Zimbabwe) **B Black** (Canada) **G Connell**	**6**	**7**
