= 1993 Gerry Weber Open – Doubles =

Doubles
- 1993 Gerry Weber Open

Final
- Champions: (Czech Republic) Petr Korda (Czech Republic) Cyril Suk
- Runners-up: (Czech Republic) Lukáš Dlouhý (India) Leander Paes
- Score: 7–6, 5–7, 6–3

Details
- Draw: 16
- Seeds: 4

Events
Singles	Doubles
Gerry Weber Open	· 1994 →

Petr Korda and Cyril Suk won in the final 7–6, 5–7, 6–3 against Mike Bauer and Marc-Kevin Goellner.

== Seeds ==
1. (Canada) Grant Connell / (United States) Patrick Galbraith (first round)
2. (Switzerland) Jakob Hlasek / (United States) Patrick McEnroe (first round)
3. (Netherlands) Paul Haarhuis / (Netherlands) Jan Siemerink (first round)
4. n/a
5. (Russia) Andrei Olhovskiy / (Netherlands) Menno Oosting (semifinals)

== Draw ==
=== Key ===
- Q = Qualifier
- WC = Wild card
- LL = Lucky loser
- Alt = Alternate
- SE = Special exempt
- PR = Protected ranking
- ITF = ITF entry
- JE = Junior exempt
- w/o = Walkover
- r = Retired
- d = Defaulted
- SR = Special ranking

=== Draw ===
First round
1	(Canada) G Connell (United States) P Galbraith	6	3	2
(United States) M Bauer (Germany) M-K Goellner	4	6	6
(Ukraine) A Medvedev (Romania) A Pavel	7	3	7
(South Africa) J-L de Jager (South Africa) M Ondruska	6	6	6
5	(Russia) A Olhovskiy (Netherlands) M Oosting	6	6	6
(United States) R Benson (Australia) J Ireland	3	7	1
(Germany) H Dreekmann (Germany) B Karbacher	w/o
Q	(Germany) K Braasch (United States) A Hombrecher
(Czech Republic) P Korda (Czech Republic) C Suk	6	7
(Denmark) M Mortensen (Sweden) Tobias Svantesson	3	6
(Austria) A Antonitsch (United States) R Matuszewski	7	6
3	(Netherlands) P Haarhuis (Netherlands) J Siemerink	6	3
(Czech Republic) T Anzari (Czech Republic) V Flegl	6	6	6
(Netherlands) S Groen (Germany) A Mronz	7	4	4
WC	(Germany) P Kühnen (Germany) C-U Steeb	6	1	7
2	(Switzerland) J Hlasek (United States) P McEnroe	4	6	6

Quarterfinals
(United States) M Bauer (Germany) Marc-Kevin Goellner
(Ukraine) A Medvedev (Romania) A Pavel	w/o
5	(Russia) A Olhovskiy (Netherlands) M Oosting	6	6	6
(United States) R Benson (Australia) J Ireland	7	3	4
(Czech Republic) P Korda (Czech Republic) C Suk	7	6	7
(Austria) A Antonitsch (Czech Republic) R Matuszewski	6	7	5
(Czech Republic) T Anzari (France) V Flegl	4	4
(Germany) P Kühnen (Germany) C-U Steeb	6	6

Semifinals
(United States) Mike Bauer (Germany) M-K Goellner	6	6	7
5	(Russia) Andrei Olhovskiy (Netherlands) M Oosting	3	7	6
(Czech Republic) P Korda (Czech Republic) C Suk	4	7	6
(Germany) P Kühnen (Germany) C-U Steeb	6	6	4

Final
(United States) M Bauer (Germany) M-K Goellner	6	7	3
(Czech Republic) P Korda (Czech Republic) C Suk	7	5	6
