= 1998 Gerry Weber Open – Doubles =

Doubles
- 1998 Gerry Weber Open

Final
- Champions: (South Africa) Ellis Ferreira (United States) Rick Leach
- Runners-up: (South Africa) John-Laffnie de Jager (Germany) Marc-Kevin Goellner
- Score: 4–6, 6–4, 7–6

Details
- Draw: 16
- Seeds: 4

Events
Singles	Doubles
← 1997 ·	Gerry Weber Open	· 1999 →

Karsten Braasch and Michael Stich were the defending champions, but Stich retired after the 1997 season and Braasch played with Jens Knippschild, but lost in the first round
Ellis Ferreira and Rick Leach won the final 4–6, 6–4, 7–6 against John-Laffnie de Jager and Marc-Kevin Goellner.

== Seeds ==
1. (Netherlands) Jacco Eltingh / (Netherlands) Paul Haarhuis (first round)
2. (South Africa) Ellis Ferreira / (United States) Rick Leach (champions)
3. (United States) Jim Grabb / (Australia) David Macpherson (quarterfinals)
4. (South Africa) David Adams / (Russia) Yevgeny Kafelnikov (first round)

== Draw ==
=== Key ===
- Q = Qualifier
- WC = Wild card
- LL = Lucky loser
- Alt = Alternate
- ITF = ITF entry
- PR = Protected ranking
- SR = Special ranking
- SE = Special exempt
- JE = Junior exempt
- JR = Junior Accelerator Programme entrant
- CO = College Accelerator Programme entrant
- NG = Next Gen Accelerator Program entrant
- w/o = Walkover
- r = Retired
- d = Defaulted

=== Draw ===
First round
1	(Netherlands) J Eltingh (Netherlands) P Haarhuis	6	4	6
Q	(Sweden) F Bergh (Netherlands) S Groen	4	6	7
WC	(Germany) F Stauder (Germany) C Vinck	4	4
(United States) J Tarango (Netherlands) F Wibier	6	6
4	(South Africa) D Adams (Russia) Y Kafelnikov	6	4
(South Africa) JL de Jager (Germany) MK Goellner	7	6
(Germany) K Braasch (Germany) J Knippschild	7	6	2
WC	(Germany) B Becker (Germany) D Prinosil	6	7	6
(Australia) J Eagle (Australia) A Florent	6	3	6
(South Africa) M Barnard (South Africa) B Haygarth	4	6	2
(North Macedonia) A Kitinov (Czech Republic) P Vízner	7	4	2
3	(United States) J Grabb (Australia) D Macpherson	5	6	6
(Australia) P Kilderry (Sweden) P Nyborg	4	4
(United States) M Keil (United States) TJ Middleton	6	6
WC	(Germany) N Kiefer (Germany) A Rădulescu	6	6	6
2	(South Africa) E Ferreira (United States) R Leach	7	4	7

Quarterfinals
Q	(Sweden) F Bergh (Netherlands) S Groen	6	4
(United States) J Tarango (Netherlands) F Wibier	7	6
(South Africa) JL de Jager (Germany) MK Goellner	7	5	7
WC	(Germany) B Becker (Germany) D Prinosil	5	7	6
(Australia) J Eagle (Australia) A Florent	7	7
3	(United States) J Grabb (Australia) D Macpherson	6	6
(United States) M Keil (United States) TJ Middleton	6	2
2	(South Africa) E Ferreira (United States) R Leach	7	6

Semifinals
(United States) J Tarango (Netherlands) F Wibier	6	4
(South Africa) JL de Jager (Germany) MK Goellner	7	6
(Australia) J Eagle (Australia) A Florent	3	4
2	(South Africa) E Ferreira (United States) R Leach	6	6

Final
(South Africa) JL de Jager (Germany) MK Goellner	6	4	6
2	(South Africa) E Ferreira (United States) R Leach	4	6	7
