= 2000 Gerry Weber Open – Doubles =

Doubles
- 2000 Gerry Weber Open

Final
- Champions: (Sweden) Nicklas Kulti (Sweden) Mikael Tillström
- Runners-up: (India) Mahesh Bhupathi (Germany) David Prinosil
- Score: 7–6^{(7–4)}, 7–6^{(7–4)}

Details
- Draw: 16
- Seeds: 4

Events
Singles	Doubles
← 1999 ·	Gerry Weber Open	· 2001 →

Jonas Björkman and Patrick Rafter were the defending champions, but lost in the semifinals this year.

Nicklas Kulti and Mikael Tillström won the title, defeating Mahesh Bhupathi and David Prinosil 7–6^{(7–4)}, 7–6^{(7–4)} in the final.

== Seeds ==
1. (Netherlands) Paul Haarhuis / (Australia) Sandon Stolle (semifinals)
2. (India) Mahesh Bhupathi / (Germany) David Prinosil (final)
3. (Sweden) Nicklas Kulti / (Sweden) Mikael Tillström (champions)
4. (Sweden) Jonas Björkman / (Australia) Patrick Rafter (semifinals)

== Draw ==
=== Key ===
- Q = Qualifier
- WC = Wild card
- LL = Lucky loser
- Alt = Alternate
- SE = Special exempt
- PR = Protected ranking
- ITF = ITF entry
- JE = Junior exempt
- w/o = Walkover
- r = Retired
- d = Defaulted
- SR = Special ranking

=== Draw ===
First round
1	(Netherlands) P Haarhuis (Australia) S Stolle	7^{11}	3	7^{11}
WC	(Germany) M-K Goellner (Germany) N Kiefer	6^{9}	6	6^{9}
(South Africa) R Koenig (Russia) A Olhovskiy	6^{4}	6	6
(France) O Delaître (United States) J Tarango	7^{7}	2	4
3	(Sweden) N Kulti (Sweden) M Tillström	1	6	6
(United States) D Johnson (South Africa) P Norval	6	2	2
LL	(Germany) K Braasch (Germany) F Stauder	6	2	7^{11}
(Italy) M Bertolini (Italy) C Brandi	3	6	6^{9}
Q	(France) N Escudé (Switzerland) R Federer	6	6
(Japan) T Shimada (South Africa) M Wakefield	3	4
(United States) D Bowen (North Macedonia) A Kitinov	2	7^{7}	3
4	(Sweden) J Björkman (Australia) P Rafter	6	6^{4}	6
(Australia) A Florent (Australia) D Macpherson	5	6	6
WC	(Germany) M Kohlmann (Germany) R Schüttler	7	3	4
WC	(United States) Alex Bose (Germany) T Haas	5	4
2	(India) M Bhupathi (Germany) D Prinosil	7	6

Quarterfinals
1	(Netherlands) P Haarhuis (Australia) S Stolle	7	6
(South Africa) R Koenig (Russia) A Olhovskiy	5	3
3	(Sweden) N Kulti (Sweden) M Tillström	4	6	6
LL	(Germany) K Braasch (Germany) F Stauder	6	3	4
Q	(France) N Escudé (Switzerland) R Federer	3	4
4	(Sweden) J Björkman (Australia) P Rafter	6	6
(Australia) A Florent (Australia) D Macpherson	6^{2}	3
2	(India) M Bhupathi (Germany) D Prinosil	7^{7}	6

Semifinals
1	(Netherlands) P Haarhuis (Australia) S Stolle	6	4	3
3	(Sweden) N Kulti (Sweden) M Tillström	3	6	6
4	(Sweden) J Björkman (Australia) P Rafter	6	6^{5}	4
2	(India) M Bhupathi (Germany) D Prinosil	3	7^{7}	6

Final
3	(Sweden) N Kulti (Sweden) M Tillström	7^{7}	7^{7}
2	(India) M Bhupathi (Germany) D Prinosil	6^{4}	6^{4}
