= 1998 Gerry Weber Open =

- Date: 8–15 June
- Edition: 6th
- Category: International Series
- Draw: 32S / 16D
- Prize money: $875,000
- Surface: Grass / outdoors
- Location: Halle, Westfalen, Germany
- Venue: Gerry Weber Stadion

Champions

Singles
- (Russia) Yevgeny Kafelnikov

Doubles
- (South Africa) Ellis Ferreira / (United States) Rick Leach
- Gerry Weber Open

The 1998 Gerry Weber Open was a men's tennis tournament played on outdoor grass courts. It was the 6th edition of the Gerry Weber Open, and was part of the International Series of the 1998 ATP Tour. It took place at the Gerry Weber Stadion in Halle, Westfalen, Germany, from 8 June through 15 June 1998. Second-seeded Yevgeny Kafelnikov won his second consecutive singles title at the event.

== Finals ==
=== Singles ===
(Russia) Yevgeny Kafelnikov defeated (Sweden) Magnus Larsson 6–4, 6–4

- It was Kafelnikov's 2nd singles title of the year and the 15th of his career.

=== Doubles ===
(South Africa) Ellis Ferreira / (United States) Rick Leach defeated (South Africa) John-Laffnie de Jager / (Germany) Marc-Kevin Goellner 4–6, 6–4, 7–6
