= Rene Nicklisch =

German tennis player (born 1976)

- Full name: Rene Nicklisch
- Country (sports): Germany
- Born: 31 March 1976 (age 49) Salzkotten, West Germany
- Prize money: $27,493

Singles
- Career record: 0–1
- Career titles: 0
- Highest ranking: No. 246 (18 October 1999)

Doubles
- Career record: 0–1
- Career titles: 0
- Highest ranking: No. 343 (8 March 1999)

Rene Nicklisch (born 31 March 1976) is a German former professional tennis player.

== Biography ==
Nicklisch was born in Salzkotten and performed well as a junior, most notably winning the 16 and Under title at the Orange Bowl in 1992, which he secured with a win in the final over Rogier Wassen. He also represented Germany in the Junior Davis Cup in 1992 when they finished runners-up to France.

On the professional tour he made it to 246 in the world. He played in the main draw of the 1993 Gerry Weber Open as a wildcard and lost in the first round to seventh seed Marcos Ondruska. In 1999 he won two Challenger titles, the singles at Aschaffenburg and doubles at Sylt. His victory in the Aschaffenburg Challenger included wins from the quarter-final stage over Radek Štěpánek, Alexander Popp and then Luis Horna in the final. At the 2000 BMW Open he made a return to an ATP Tour main draw by featuring the men's doubles competition with Tomas Nydahl. They were beaten in the first round by eventual champions David Adams and John-Laffnie de Jager.

== Challenger titles ==
=== Singles: (1) ===
No.	Year	Tournament	Surface	Opponent	Score
1.	1999	Aschaffenburg, Germany	Clay	(Peru) Luis Horna	3–6, 6–2, 7–6^{7}

=== Doubles: (1) ===
No.	Year	Tournament	Surface	Partner	Opponents	Score
1.	1999	Sylt, Germany	Clay	(Hungary) Attila Sávolt	(Italy) Florian Allgauer (Italy) Davide Scala	4–6, 6–3, 6–1
