= 1996 Gerry Weber Open – Singles =

Singles
- 1996 Gerry Weber Open
- 1995 Champion: (Switzerland) Marc Rosset

Final
- Champion: (Sweden) Nicklas Kulti
- Runner-up: (Russia) Yevgeny Kafelnikov
- Score: 6–7^{(5–7)}, 6–3, 6–4

Details
- Draw: 32
- Seeds: 8

Events
Singles	Doubles
← 1995 ·	Gerry Weber Open	· 1997 →

Marc Rosset was the defending champion but lost in the second round to Daniel Vacek.

Nicklas Kulti won in the final 6–7^{(5–7)}, 6–3, 6–4 against Yevgeny Kafelnikov.

== Seeds ==
A champion seed is indicated in bold text while text in italics indicates the round in which that seed was eliminated.

1. (Austria) Thomas Muster (second round)
2. (Russia) Yevgeny Kafelnikov (final)
3. (United States) Jim Courier (quarterfinals)
4. (Sweden) Thomas Enqvist (first round)
5. (South Africa) Wayne Ferreira (first round)
6. (Switzerland) Marc Rosset (second round)
7. (France) Arnaud Boetsch (first round)
8. (Spain) Carlos Moyá (first round)

== Draw ==
=== Key ===
- Q = Qualifier
- WC = Wild card
- LL = Lucky loser
- Alt = Alternate
- ITF = ITF entry
- PR = Protected ranking
- SR = Special ranking
- SE = Special exempt
- JE = Junior exempt
- JR = Junior Accelerator Programme entrant
- CO = College Accelerator Programme entrant
- NG = Next Gen Accelerator Program entrant
- w/o = Walkover
- r = Retired
- d = Defaulted

=== Finals ===
Semifinals
Q	**(Sweden) Nicklas Kulti**	**7^{7}**	**7^{12}**
(United States) Richey Reneberg	6^{3}	6^{10}
(Czech Republic) Daniel Vacek	3	**6**	3
2	**(Russia) Yevgeny Kafelnikov**	**6**	1	**6**

Final
Q	**(Sweden) Nicklas Kulti**	6^{5}	**6**	**6**
2	(Russia) Yevgeny Kafelnikov	**7^{7}**	3	4

=== Top half ===
First round
1	(Austria) **T Muster**	**7^{8}**	**6**
(Spain) T Carbonell	6^{6}	2
LL	(France) J-P Fleurian	3	1
(New Zealand) **B Steven**	**6**	**6**
(Italy) A Gaudenzi	3	5
Q	(Germany) **A Rădulescu**	**6**	**7**
Q	(Sweden) **N Kulti**	**7^{7}**	**6**
8	(Spain) C Moyá	6^{4}	3
WC/3	(United States) **J Courier**	**6**	**6**
(Romania) A Voinea	2	2
WC	(Germany) **N Kiefer**	**7^{7}**	**6**
Q	(Canada) S Leblanc	6^{4}	4
(Italy) R Furlan	3	2
(Germany) **H Dreekmann**	**6**	**6**
(United States) **R Reneberg**	**6**	**6**
5	(South Africa) W Ferreira	1	3

Second round
1	(Austria) T Muster	**6**	2	1
(New Zealand) **B Steven**	4	**6**	**6**
Q	(Germany) A Rădulescu	1	**6**	3
Q	(Sweden) **N Kulti**	**6**	4	**6**
WC/3	(United States) **J Courier**	**6**	**6**
WC	(Germany) N Kiefer	3	4
(Germany) H Dreekmann	1	1
(United States) **R Reneberg**	**6**	**6**

Quarterfinals
(New Zealand) B Steven	6^{2}	3
Q	(Sweden) **N Kulti**	**7^{7}**	**6**
WC/3	(United States) J Courier	**7^{7}**	4	2
(United States) **R Reneberg**	6^{3}	**6**	**6**

Semifinals
Q	(Sweden) **N Kulti**	**7^{7}**	**7^{12}**
(United States) R Reneberg	6^{3}	6^{10}

=== Bottom half ===
First round
6	(Switzerland) **M Rosset**	4	**6**	**7**
(Sweden) J Björkman	**6**	4	5
(France) G Forget	6^{5}	4
(Czech Republic) **D Vacek**	**7^{7}**	**6**
(Germany) B Karbacher	6^{5}	3
(Sweden) **M Gustafsson**	**7^{7}**	**6**
(Netherlands) **P Haarhuis**	2	**7^{7}**	**6**
4	(Sweden) T Enqvist	**6**	6^{2}	3
7	(France) A Boetsch	2	**6**	3
Q	(Sweden) **M Larsson**	**6**	3	**6**
LL	(Netherlands) S Schalken	4	6^{6}
(Switzerland) **J Hlasek**	**6**	**7^{8}**
(Zimbabwe) **B Black**	**6**	6^{5}	**6**
(Germany) D Prinosil	3	**7^{7}**	4
(Sweden) M Tillström	**7^{7}**	4	4
2	(Russia) **Y Kafelnikov**	6^{3}	**6**	**6**

Second round
6	(Switzerland) M Rosset	**6**	3	6^{0}
(Czech Republic) **D Vacek**	4	**6**	**7^{7}**
(Sweden) **M Gustafsson**	**7**	**6**
(Netherlands) P Haarhuis	5	0
Q	(Sweden) **M Larsson**	**7^{7}**	5	**6**
(Switzerland) J Hlasek	6^{2}	**7**	4
(Zimbabwe) B Black	3	4
2	(Russia) **Y Kafelnikov**	**6**	**6**

Quarterfinals
(Czech Republic) **D Vacek**	**6**	4	**6**
(Sweden) M Gustafsson	2	**6**	2
Q	(Sweden) M Larsson	**6**	6^{5}	6^{11}
2	(Russia) **Y Kafelnikov**	4	**7^{7}**	**7^{13}**

Semifinals
(Czech Republic) D Vacek	3	**6**	3
2	(Russia) **Y Kafelnikov**	**6**	1	**6**
