= 2001 Gerry Weber Open – Doubles =

Doubles
- 2001 Gerry Weber Open

Final
- Champions: (Canada) Daniel Nestor (Australia) Sandon Stolle
- Runners-up: (Belarus) Max Mirnyi (Australia) Patrick Rafter
- Score: 6–4, 6–7^{(5–7)}, 6–1

Details
- Draw: 16
- Seeds: 4

Events
Singles	Doubles
← 2000 ·	Gerry Weber Open	· 2002 →

Nicklas Kulti and Mikael Tillström were the defending champions but did not compete that year.

Daniel Nestor and Sandon Stolle won in the final 6–4, 6–7^{(5–7)}, 6–1 against Max Mirnyi and Patrick Rafter.

== Seeds ==
Champion seeds are indicated in bold text while text in italics indicates the round in which those seeds were eliminated.

1. (Canada) **Daniel Nestor** / (Australia) **Sandon Stolle (champions)**
2. (Russia) Yevgeny Kafelnikov / (Germany) David Prinosil (quarterfinals)
3. (Australia) Joshua Eagle / (Federal Republic of Yugoslavia) Nenad Zimonjić (semifinals)
4. (Zimbabwe) Wayne Black / (Zimbabwe) Kevin Ullyett (semifinals)

== Draw ==
=== Key ===
- Q = Qualifier
- WC = Wild card
- LL = Lucky loser
- Alt = Alternate
- SE = Special exempt
- PR = Protected ranking
- ITF = ITF entry
- JE = Junior exempt
- w/o = Walkover
- r = Retired
- d = Defaulted
- SR = Special ranking

First round
1	(Canada) **D Nestor** (Australia) **S Stolle**	**6**	**7**
(Czech Republic) P Pála (Czech Republic) P Vízner	3	5
(Australia) D Macpherson (South Africa) G Stafford	6^{5}	**7^{7}**	6^{5}
(South Africa) **C Haggard** (Belgium) **T Vanhoudt**	**7^{7}**	6^{3}	**7^{7}**
4	(Zimbabwe) **W Black** (Zimbabwe) **K Ullyett**	**6**	4	**6**
(Argentina) P Albano (Argentina) L Arnold	2	**6**	2
WC	(Germany) **R Schüttler** (Germany) **F Stauder**	**6**	**6**
(Japan) T Shimada (South Africa) M Wakefield	3	4
WC	(Germany) **M Kohlmann** (Romania) **A Pavel**	**7**	**7^{7}**
Q	(Netherlands) S Groen (North Macedonia) A Kitinov	5	6^{1}
(The Bahamas) M Knowles (United States) B MacPhie	3	4
3	(Australia) **J Eagle** (Federal Republic of Yugoslavia) **N Zimonjić**	**6**	**6**
WC	(Germany) M-K Goellner (Germany) N Kiefer	6^{2}	4
(Belarus) **M Mirnyi** (Australia) **P Rafter**	**7^{7}**	**6**
(Switzerland) R Federer (Ecuador) N Lapentti	4	4
2	(Russia) **Y Kafelnikov** (Germany) **D Prinosil**	**6**	**6**

Quarterfinals
1	(Canada) **D Nestor** (Australia) **S Stolle**	**7^{7}**	**7^{9}**
(South Africa) C Haggard (Belgium) T Vanhoudt	6^{2}	6^{7}
4	(Zimbabwe) **W Black** (Zimbabwe) **K Ullyett**	**6**	**6**
WC	(Germany) R Schüttler (Germany) F Stauder	3	2
WC	(Germany) M Kohlmann (Romania) A Pavel	4	4
3	(Australia) **J Eagle** (Federal Republic of Yugoslavia) **N Zimonjić**	**6**	**6**
(Belarus) **M Mirnyi** (Australia) **P Rafter**	**7^{7}**	**7^{7}**
2	(Russia) Y Kafelnikov (Germany) D Prinosil	6^{1}	6^{4}

Semifinals
1	(Canada) **D Nestor** (Australia) **S Stolle**	**7^{7}**	**7^{7}**
4	(Zimbabwe) W Black (Zimbabwe) K Ullyett	6^{0}	6^{2}
3	(Australia) J Eagle (Federal Republic of Yugoslavia) N Zimonjić	3	6^{7}
(Belarus) **M Mirnyi** (Australia) **P Rafter**	**6**	**7^{9}**

Final
1	(Canada) **D Nestor** (Australia) **S Stolle**	**6**	6^{5}	**6**
(Belarus) M Mirnyi (Australia) P Rafter	4	**7^{7}**	1
