= 1999 Gerry Weber Open – Doubles =

Doubles
- 1999 Gerry Weber Open

Final
- Champions: (Sweden) Jonas Björkman (Australia) Patrick Rafter
- Runners-up: (Netherlands) Paul Haarhuis (United States) Jared Palmer
- Score: 6–3, 7–5

Details
- Draw: 16
- Seeds: 4

Events
Singles	Doubles
← 1998 ·	Gerry Weber Open	· 2000 →

Ellis Ferreira and Rick Leach were the defending champions, but Leach did not participate this year. Ferreira partnered Nicklas Kulti, losing in the quarterfinals.

Jonas Björkman and Patrick Rafter won the title, defeating Paul Haarhuis and Jared Palmer 6–3, 7–5 in the final.

== Seeds ==
1. (Sweden) Jonas Björkman / (Australia) Patrick Rafter (champions)
2. (Netherlands) Paul Haarhuis / (United States) Jared Palmer (final)
3. (South Africa) David Adams / (South Africa) John-Laffnie de Jager (quarterfinals)
4. (Czech Republic) Jiří Novák / (Czech Republic) David Rikl (first round)

== Draw ==
=== Key ===
- Q = Qualifier
- WC = Wild card
- LL = Lucky loser
- Alt = Alternate
- SE = Special exempt
- PR = Protected ranking
- ITF = ITF entry
- JE = Junior exempt
- w/o = Walkover
- r = Retired
- d = Defaulted
- SR = Special ranking

=== Draw ===
First round
1	(Sweden) J Björkman (Australia) P Rafter	5	6	6
Q	(Germany) K Braasch (Germany) F Stauder	7	3	4
(South Africa) E Ferreira (Sweden) N Kulti	6	6	6
WC	(Germany) N Kiefer (Netherlands) J Siemerink	3	7	3
4	(Czech Republic) J Novák (Czech Republic) D Rikl	3	5
(Germany) D Prinosil (Czech Republic) D Vacek	6	7
(Australia) A Florent (Australia) D Macpherson	6	6	6
WC	(Germany) T Haas (Netherlands) R Krajicek	7	4	2
(United States) P Galbraith (United States) J Gimelstob	6	5	3
(United States) R Reneberg (United States) J Stark	3	7	6
(South Africa) C Haggard (South Africa) R Koenig	1	2
3	(South Africa) D Adams (South Africa) J-L de Jager	6	6
(North Macedonia) A Kitinov (Sweden) P Nyborg	6	6	6
WC	(Germany) H Dreekmann (Germany) R Schüttler	7	2	2
(South Africa) P Norval (Zimbabwe) K Ullyett	6	3
2	(Netherlands) P Haarhuis (United States) J Palmer	7	6

Quarterfinals
1	(Sweden) J Björkman (Australia) P Rafter	6	2	6
(South Africa) E Ferreira (Sweden) N Kulti	4	6	4
(Germany) D Prinosil (Czech Republic) D Vacek	6	7
(Australia) A Florent (Australia) D Macpherson	3	6
(United States) R Reneberg (United States) J Stark	7	6	7
3	(South Africa) D Adams (South Africa) J-L de Jager	5	7	6
(North Macedonia) A Kitinov (Sweden) P Nyborg	4	2
2	(Netherlands) P Haarhuis (United States) J Palmer	6	6

Semifinals
1	(Sweden) J Björkman (Australia) P Rafter	6	7
(Germany) D Prinosil (Czech Republic) D Vacek	4	5
(United States) R Reneberg (United States) J Stark	4	6
2	(Netherlands) P Haarhuis (United States) J Palmer	6	7

Final
1	(Sweden) J Björkman (Australia) P Rafter	6	7
2	(Netherlands) P Haarhuis (United States) J Palmer	3	5
