= 1997 Gerry Weber Open – Singles =

Singles
- 1997 Gerry Weber Open

Final
- Champion: (Russia) Yevgeny Kafelnikov
- Runner-up: (Czech Republic) Petr Korda
- Score: 7–6^{(7–2)}, 6–7^{(5–7)}, 7–6^{(9–7)}

Details
- Draw: 32
- Seeds: 8

Events
Singles	Doubles
← 1996 ·	Gerry Weber Open	· 1998 →

Nicklas Kulti was the defending champion, but lost in the second round this year.

Yevgeny Kafelnikov won the title, beating Petr Korda 7–6^{(7–2)}, 6–7^{(5–7)}, 7–6^{(9–7)} in the final.

== Seeds ==
1. (Russia) Yevgeny Kafelnikov (champion)
2. (Austria) Thomas Muster (quarterfinals)
3. (Netherlands) Richard Krajicek (second round)
4. (Germany) Boris Becker (semifinals)
5. (Ukraine) Andrei Medvedev (first round)
6. (Czech Republic) Bohdan Ulihrach (first round)
7. (Germany) Michael Stich (quarterfinals)
8. (Czech Republic) Petr Korda (final)

== Draw ==
=== Key ===
- Q = Qualifier
- WC = Wild card
- LL = Lucky loser
- Alt = Alternate
- ITF = ITF entry
- PR = Protected ranking
- SR = Special ranking
- SE = Special exempt
- JE = Junior exempt
- JR = Junior Accelerator Programme entrant
- CO = College Accelerator Programme entrant
- NG = Next Gen Accelerator Program entrant
- w/o = Walkover
- r = Retired
- d = Defaulted

=== Finals ===
Semifinals
1	(Russia) Yevgeny Kafelnikov	6	6
4	(Germany) Boris Becker	3	4
(Netherlands) Paul Haarhuis	6^{5}	4
8	(Czech Republic) Petr Korda	7^{7}	6

Final
1	(Russia) Yevgeny Kafelnikov	7^{7}	6^{5}	7^{9}
8	(Czech Republic) Petr Korda	6^{2}	7^{7}	6^{7}

=== Top half ===
First round
1	(Russia) Y Kafelnikov	6	6
(Netherlands) S Schalken	0	2
WC	(Germany) N Kiefer	6	6
Q	(United States) J Grabb	3	2
(France) L Roux	2	4
(South Africa) G Stafford	6	6
(Germany) B Karbacher	6	5	2
7	(Germany) M Stich	4	7	6
4	(Germany) B Becker	6	7^{7}
(Germany) A Radulescu	3	6^{1}
WC	(Germany) F Stauder	4	1
(Germany) H Dreekmann	6	6
(United States) J Tarango	2	6	6
(Romania) A Voinea	6	4	2
WC	(Germany) T Haas	6	6
6	(Czech Republic) B Ulihrach	1	2

Second round
1	(Russia) Y Kafelnikov	7^{7}	7^{7}
WC	(Germany) N Kiefer	6^{3}	6^{2}
(South Africa) G Stafford	3	6	6^{7}
7	(Germany) M Stich	6	3	7^{9}
4	(Germany) B Becker	6	6
(Germany) H Dreekmann	3	4
(United States) J Tarango	6	6
WC	(Germany) T Haas	4	4

Quarterfinals
1	(Russia) Y Kafelnikov	7^{7}	6^{4}	6
7	(Germany) M Stich	6^{5}	7^{7}	3
4	(Germany) B Becker	6	6
(United States) J Tarango	4	2

Semifinals
1	(Russia) Y Kafelnikov	6	6
4	(Germany) B Becker	3	4

=== Bottom half ===
First round
5	(Ukraine) A Medvedev	6^{5}	3
(Netherlands) P Haarhuis	7^{7}	6
(Czech Republic) M Damm	6	6
(Sweden) T Johansson	1	3
Q	(Germany) K Braasch	1	7^{12}	3
(United States) R Reneberg	6	6^{10}	6
Q	(Australia) J Eagle	1	1
3	(Netherlands) R Krajicek	6	6
8	(Czech Republic) P Korda	7	2	6
(Spain) T Carbonell	5	6	2
Q	(France) N Escudé	6	7^{7}
(United States) V Spadea	4	6^{5}
(Czech Republic) D Vacek	6^{4}	7	6^{4}
(Sweden) N Kulti	7^{7}	5	7^{7}
(Germany) D Prinosil	6	0^{r}
2	(Austria) T Muster	3	1

Second round
(Netherlands) P Haarhuis	6^{4}	6	7^{7}
(Czech Republic) M Damm	7^{7}	3	6^{5}
(United States) R Reneberg	4	7^{7}	7^{8}
3	(Netherlands) R Krajicek	6	6^{2}	6^{6}
8	(Czech Republic) P Korda	6	6
Q	(France) N Escudé	3	3
(Sweden) N Kulti	2	3
2	(Austria) T Muster	6	6

Quarterfinals
(Netherlands) P Haarhuis	6	6
(United States) R Reneberg	2	1
8	(Czech Republic) P Korda	6	6
2	(Austria) T Muster	3	4

Semifinals
(Netherlands) P Haarhuis	6^{5}	4
8	(Czech Republic) P Korda	7^{7}	6
