= 2002 Gerry Weber Open =

- Date: 10–16 June
- Edition: 10th
- Category: International Series
- Draw: 32S / 16D
- Prize money: $736,000
- Surface: Grass / outdoor
- Location: Halle, Germany
- Venue: Gerry Weber Stadion

Champions

Singles
- (Russia) Yevgeny Kafelnikov

Doubles
- (Germany) David Prinosil / (Czech Republic) David Rikl
← 2001 ·	Gerry Weber Open	· 2003 →

The 2002 Gerry Weber Open was a men's tennis tournament played on grass courts at the Gerry Weber Stadion in Halle, North Rhine-Westphalia in Germany and was part of the International Series of the 2002 ATP Tour. The tournament ran from 10 June until 16 June 2002. First-seeded Yevgeny Kafelnikov won the singles title.

== Finals ==
=== Singles ===
(Russia) Yevgeny Kafelnikov defeated (Germany) Nicolas Kiefer 2–6, 6–4, 6–4

- It was Kafelnikov's 1st singles title of the year and the 25th of his career.

=== Doubles ===
(Germany) David Prinosil / (Czech Republic) David Rikl defeated (Sweden) Jonas Björkman / (Australia) Todd Woodbridge 4–6, 7–6^{(7–5)}, 7–5

- It was Prinosil's only title of the year and the 13th of his career. It was Rikl's 2nd title of the year and the 24th of his career.
