= 1995 Gerry Weber Open =

- Date: 19–26 June
- Edition: 3rd
- Category: World Series
- Draw: 32S / 16D
- Prize money: $700,000
- Surface: Grass / outdoor
- Location: Halle, North Rhine-Westphalia, Germany
- Venue: Gerry Weber Stadion

Champions

Singles
- (Switzerland) Marc Rosset

Doubles
- (Netherlands) Jacco Eltingh / (Netherlands) Paul Haarhuis
- Gerry Weber Open

The 1995 Gerry Weber Open was a men's tennis tournament played on outdoor grass courts. It was the 3rd edition of the Gerry Weber Open, and was part of the World Series of the 1995 ATP Tour. It took place at the Gerry Weber Stadion in Halle, North Rhine-Westphalia, Germany, from 19 June through 26 June 1995. Fourth-seeded Marc Rosset won the singles title.

== Finals ==
=== Singles ===
(Switzerland) Marc Rosset defeated (Germany) Michael Stich 3–6, 7–6^{(13–11)}, 7–6^{(10–8)}

- It was Rosset's 2nd singles title of the year and the 11th of his career.

=== Doubles ===
(Netherlands) Jacco Eltingh / (Netherlands) Paul Haarhuis defeated (Russia) Yevgeny Kafelnikov / (Russia) Andrei Olhovskiy 6–2, 3–6, 6–3

- It was Eltingh's 3rd title of the year and the 27th of his career. It was Haarhuis' 4th title of the year and the 25th of his career.
