= 2002 Gerry Weber Open – Doubles =

Doubles
- 2002 Gerry Weber Open

Final
- Champions: (Germany) David Prinosil (Czech Republic) David Rikl
- Runners-up: (Sweden) Jonas Björkman (Australia) Todd Woodbridge
- Score: 4–6, 7–6^{(7–5)}, 7–5

Details
- Draw: 16
- Seeds: 4

Events
Singles	Doubles
← 2001 ·	Gerry Weber Open	· 2003 →

Daniel Nestor and Sandon Stolle were the defending champions but only Stolle competed that year with Joshua Eagle.

Eagle and Stolle lost in the first round to Martin Damm and Cyril Suk.

David Prinosil and David Rikl won in the final 4–6, 7–6^{(7–5)}, 7–5 against Jonas Björkman and Todd Woodbridge.

== Seeds ==
Champion seeds are indicated in bold text while text in italics indicates the round in which those seeds were eliminated.

1. (Sweden) Jonas Björkman / (Australia) Todd Woodbridge (final)
2. (Czech Republic) Martin Damm / (Czech Republic) Cyril Suk (semifinals)
3. (Czech Republic) Jiří Novák / (Czech Republic) Radek Štěpánek (first round)
4. (Germany) **David Prinosil** / (Czech Republic) **David Rikl (champions)**

== Draw ==
=== Key ===
- Q = Qualifier
- WC = Wild card
- LL = Lucky loser
- Alt = Alternate
- SE = Special exempt
- PR = Protected ranking
- ITF = ITF entry
- JE = Junior exempt
- w/o = Walkover
- r = Retired
- d = Defaulted
- SR = Special ranking

First round
1	(Sweden) **J Björkman** (Australia) **T Woodbridge**	**6**	**6**
WC	(Germany) R Schüttler (Russia) M Youzhny	2	0
(Croatia) I Ljubičić (Czech Republic) B Ulihrach	2	2
WC	(Germany) **H Dreekmann** (Romania) **A Pavel**	**6**	**6**
3	(Czech Republic) J Novák (Czech Republic) R Štěpánek	3	4
(Russia) **Y Kafelnikov** (France) **F Santoro**	**6**	**6**
WC	(Germany) **K Braasch** (Germany) **F Stauder**	**6**	**6**
(Czech Republic) T Cibulec (United States) J Tarango	4	2
(Czech Republic) P Pála (Czech Republic) P Vízner	6^{5}	3
(Sweden) **S Aspelin** (Russia) **A Olhovskiy**	**7^{7}**	**6**
(United States) B MacPhie (Federal Republic of Yugoslavia) N Zimonjić	2	3
4	(Germany) **D Prinosil** (Czech Republic) **D Rikl**	**6**	**6**
(Sweden) **T Johansson** (Germany) **N Kiefer**	6^{6}	**7^{7}**	**7^{7}**
(Argentina) L Arnold (Argentina) G Etlis	**7^{8}**	6^{4}	6^{5}
(Australia) J Eagle (Australia) S Stolle	**6**	4	4
2	(Czech Republic) **M Damm** (Czech Republic) **C Suk**	4	**6**	**6**

Quarterfinals
1	(Sweden) **J Björkman** (Australia) **T Woodbridge**	**7^{7}**	**7^{7}**
WC	(Germany) H Dreekmann (Romania) A Pavel	6^{5}	6^{5}
(Russia) **Y Kafelnikov** (France) **F Santoro**	**6**	**6**
WC	(Germany) K Braasch (Germany) F Stauder	3	4
(Sweden) S Aspelin (Russia) A Olhovskiy	4	4
4	(Germany) **D Prinosil** (Czech Republic) **D Rikl**	**6**	**6**
(Sweden) T Johansson (Germany) N Kiefer
2	(Czech Republic) **M Damm** (Czech Republic) **C Suk**	w/o

Semifinals
1	(Sweden) **J Björkman** (Australia) **T Woodbridge**	**6**	**6**
(Russia) Y Kafelnikov (France) F Santoro	4	1
4	(Germany) **D Prinosil** (Czech Republic) **D Rikl**	**6**	6^{3}	**6**
2	(Czech Republic) M Damm (Czech Republic) C Suk	3	**7^{7}**	3

Final
1	(Sweden) J Björkman (Australia) T Woodbridge	**6**	6^{5}	5
4	(Germany) **D Prinosil** (Czech Republic) **D Rikl**	4	**7^{7}**	**7**
