= 1996 Gerry Weber Open =

- Date: 17–23 June
- Edition: 4th
- Category: World Series
- Draw: 32S / 16D
- Prize money: $875,000
- Surface: Grass / outdoors
- Location: Halle, Germany
- Venue: Gerry Weber Stadion

Champions

Singles
- (Sweden) Nicklas Kulti

Doubles
- (Zimbabwe) Byron Black / (Canada) Grant Connell
- Gerry Weber Open

The 1996 Gerry Weber Open was a men's tennis tournament played on outdoor grass courts at the Gerry Weber Stadion in Halle, North Rhine-Westphalia in Germany and was part of the World Series of the 1996 ATP Tour. It was the fourth edition of the tournament and was held from 17 June through 23 June 1996. Unseeded Nicklas Kulti won the singles title.

== Finals ==
=== Singles ===
(Sweden) Nicklas Kulti defeated (Russia) Yevgeny Kafelnikov 6–7^{(5–7)}, 6–3, 6–4

- It was Kulti's 1st singles title of the year and the 3rd and last of his career.

=== Doubles ===
(Zimbabwe) Byron Black / (Canada) Grant Connell defeated (Russia) Yevgeny Kafelnikov / (Czech Republic) Daniel Vacek 6–1, 7–5

- It was Black's 4th title of the year and the 15th of his career. It was Connell's 3rd title of the year and the 20th of his career.
