= 1995 Gerry Weber Open – Doubles =

Doubles
- 1995 Gerry Weber Open

Final
- Champions: (Netherlands) Jacco Eltingh (Netherlands) Paul Haarhuis
- Runners-up: (Russia) Yevgeny Kafelnikov (Russia) Andrei Olhovskiy
- Score: 6–2, 3–6, 6–3

Details
- Draw: 16
- Seeds: 4

Events
Singles	Doubles
← 1994 ·	Gerry Weber Open	· 1996 →

Olivier Delaître and Guy Forget were the defending champions, but they did not participate together this year. Delaître partnered David Prinosil, losing in the semifinals. Forget partnered Jakob Hlasek, losing in the quarterfinals.

Jacco Eltingh and Paul Haarhuis won the title, defeating Yevgeny Kafelnikov and Andrei Olhovskiy 6–2, 3–6, 6–3 in the final.

== Seeds ==
1. (Netherlands) Jacco Eltingh / (Netherlands) Paul Haarhuis (champions)
2. (Russia) Yevgeny Kafelnikov / (Russia) Andrei Olhovskiy (final)
3. (Czech Republic) Cyril Suk / (Czech Republic) Daniel Vacek (quarterfinals)
4. (United States) Trevor Kronemann / (Australia) David Macpherson (first round)

== Draw ==
=== Key ===
- Q = Qualifier
- WC = Wild card
- LL = Lucky loser
- Alt = Alternate
- SE = Special exempt
- PR = Protected ranking
- ITF = ITF entry
- JE = Junior exempt
- w/o = Walkover
- r = Retired
- d = Defaulted
- SR = Special ranking

=== Draw ===
First round
1	(Netherlands) J Eltingh (Netherlands) P Haarhuis	4	6	6
(Australia) W Arthurs (United Kingdom) N Broad	6	4	4
(South Africa) L Bale (South Africa) J-L de Jager	4	7	7
Q	(France) A Boetsch (Switzerland) M Rosset	6	6	5
4	(United States) T Kronemann (Australia) D Macpherson	6	6
(Sweden) A Järryd (United States) P McEnroe	7	7
(France) G Forget (Switzerland) J Hlasek	7	6
WC	(Germany) H Dreekmann (United States) A Hombrecher	6	2
(France) O Delaître (Germany) D Prinosil	6	6
(Netherlands) T Nijssen (Netherlands) J Siemerink	1	2
WC	(Germany) P Kühnen (France) H Leconte	2	4
3	(Czech Republic) C Suk (Czech Republic) D Vacek	6	6
(Australia) A Florent (Canada) S Lareau	6	4
WC	(Germany) K Braasch (Germany) J Renzenbrink	7	6
(United States) A O'Brien (United States) R Reneberg	6	2
2	(Russia) Y Kafelnikov (Russia) A Olhovskiy	7	6

Quarterfinals
1	(Netherlands) J Eltingh (Netherlands) P Haarhuis	7	6
(South Africa) L Bale (South Africa) J-L de Jager	5	2
(Sweden) A Järryd (United States) P McEnroe	4	6	6
(France) G Forget (Switzerland) J Hlasek	6	4	4
(France) O Delaître (Germany) D Prinosil	6	7
3	(Czech Republic) C Suk (Czech Republic) D Vacek	4	6
WC	(Germany) K Braasch (Germany) J Renzenbrink	5	2
2	(Russia) Y Kafelnikov (Russia) A Olhovskiy	7	6

Semifinals
1	(Netherlands) J Eltingh (Netherlands) P Haarhuis	7	6
(Sweden) A Järryd (United States) P McEnroe	6	4
(France) O Delaître (Germany) D Prinosil	5	4
2	(Russia) Y Kafelnikov (Russia) A Olhovskiy	7	6

Final
1	(Netherlands) J Eltingh (Netherlands) P Haarhuis	6	3	6
2	(Russia) Y Kafelnikov (Russia) A Olhovskiy	2	6	3
