= 1997 Gerry Weber Open – Doubles =

Doubles
- 1997 Gerry Weber Open

Final
- Champions: (Germany) Karsten Braasch (Germany) Michael Stich
- Runners-up: (South Africa) David Adams (South Africa) Marius Barnard
- Score: 7–6, 6–3

Details
- Draw: 16
- Seeds: 4

Events
Singles	Doubles
← 1996 ·	Gerry Weber Open	· 1998 →

Byron Black and Grant Connell were the defending champions, but did not participate this year.

Karsten Braasch and Michael Stich won the title, defeating David Adams and Marius Barnard 7–6, 6–3 in the final.

== Seeds ==
1. (Netherlands) Jacco Eltingh / (Netherlands) Paul Haarhuis (first round)
2. (Russia) Yevgeny Kafelnikov / (Czech Republic) Daniel Vacek (first round)
3. (Czech Republic) Martin Damm / (Czech Republic) Pavel Vízner (quarterfinals)
4. (South Africa) Byron Talbot / (United States) Jeff Tarango (quarterfinals)

== Draw ==
=== Key ===
- Q = Qualifier
- WC = Wild card
- LL = Lucky loser
- Alt = Alternate
- SE = Special exempt
- PR = Protected ranking
- ITF = ITF entry
- JE = Junior exempt
- w/o = Walkover
- r = Retired
- d = Defaulted
- SR = Special ranking

=== Draw ===
First round
1	(Netherlands) J Eltingh (Netherlands) P Haarhuis	6	6	6
(Sweden) N Kulti (Sweden) P Nyborg	1	7	7
(South Africa) D Adams (South Africa) M Barnard	6	7
Q	(Netherlands) T Kempers (Netherlands) T Nijssen	2	6
4	(South Africa) B Talbot (United States) J Tarango	7	6	6
(Australia) J Eagle (Australia) A Florent	6	7	3
(Netherlands) HJ Davids (Netherlands) S Schalken	6	7	6
(United States) L Jensen (United States) M Jensen	7	6	7
LL	(South Africa) J Coetzee (United States) A Rueb	5	5
WC	(Germany) K Braasch (Germany) M Stich	7	7
(United States) T Kronemann (Australia) D Macpherson	6	6	6
3	(Czech Republic) M Damm (Czech Republic) P Vízner	7	3	7
(United States) J Grabb (South Africa) G Stafford	7	7
(Australia) P Cash (United States) R Reneberg	6	6
WC	(Germany) N Kiefer (Germany) A Rădulescu	2	7	6
2	(Russia) Y Kafelnikov (Czech Republic) D Vacek	6	6	0

Quarterfinals
(Sweden) N Kulti (Sweden) P Nyborg	3	6	3
(South Africa) D Adams (South Africa) M Barnard	6	3	6
4	(South Africa) B Talbot (United States) J Tarango	3	2
(United States) L Jensen (United States) M Jensen	6	6
WC	(Germany) K Braasch (Germany) M Stich	6	6
3	(Czech Republic) M Damm (Czech Republic) P Vízner	4	3
(United States) J Grabb (South Africa) G Stafford	6	7
WC	(Germany) N Kiefer (Germany) A Rădulescu	2	6

Semifinals
(South Africa) D Adams (South Africa) M Barnard	2	7	7
(United States) L Jensen (United States) M Jensen	6	6	6
WC	(Germany) K Braasch (Germany) M Stich	7	6
(United States) J Grabb (South Africa) G Stafford	6	1

Final
(South Africa) D Adams (South Africa) M Barnard	6	3
WC	(Germany) K Braasch (Germany) M Stich	7	6
