= 1995 Gerry Weber Open – Singles =

Singles
- 1995 Gerry Weber Open

Final
- Champion: (Switzerland) Marc Rosset
- Runner-up: (Germany) Michael Stich
- Score: 3–6, 7–6^{(13–11)}, 7–6^{(10–8)}

Events
Singles	Doubles
← 1994 ·	Gerry Weber Open	· 1996 →

Michael Stich was the defending champion.

Marc Rosset won the title, beating Stich 3–6, 7–6^{(13–11)}, 7–6^{(10–8)} in the final.

== Seeds ==
1. (Russia) Yevgeny Kafelnikov (quarterfinals)
2. (South Africa) Wayne Ferreira (second round)
3. (Germany) Michael Stich (final)
4. (Switzerland) Marc Rosset (champion)
5. (United States) Jim Courier (first round)
6. (Spain) Alberto Berasategui (first round)
7. (Ukraine) Andrei Medvedev (first round)
8. (Germany) Bernd Karbacher (first round)

== Draw ==
=== Key ===
- Q = Qualifier
- WC = Wild card
- LL = Lucky loser
- Alt = Alternate
- SE = Special exempt
- PR = Protected ranking
- ITF = ITF entry
- JE = Junior exempt
- w/o = Walkover
- r = Retired
- d = Defaulted
- SR = Special ranking

=== Finals ===
Semifinals
(Netherlands) Paul Haarhuis	6^{4}	1
3	(Germany) Michael Stich	7^{7}	6
4	(Switzerland) Marc Rosset	7^{7}	7
(Netherlands) Jacco Eltingh	6^{4}	5

Final
3	(Germany) Michael Stich	6	6^{11}	6^{8}
4	(Switzerland) Marc Rosset	3	7^{13}	7^{10}

=== Top half ===
First round
1	(Russia) Y Kafelnikov	6	6
(Czech Republic) D Vacek	4	3
Q	(Germany) P Kühnen	4	4
(Germany) H Dreekmann	6	6
(Netherlands) P Haarhuis	4	7	6
(Sweden) A Järryd	6	5	3
(United States) P McEnroe	6	6
8	(Germany) B Karbacher	4	1
3	(Germany) M Stich	7	3	6
(Germany) D Prinosil	5	6	3
(Netherlands) S Schalken	2	7	6
WC	(France) H Leconte	6	5	4
(France) A Boetsch	4	7	7^{7}
(France) G Forget	6	5	6^{5}
(United States) R Reneberg	6^{5}	6	7^{12}
5	(United States) J Courier	7^{7}	3	6^{10}

Second round
1	(Russia) Y Kafelnikov	6	6
(Germany) H Dreekmann	4	2
(Netherlands) P Haarhuis	4	7	6
(United States) P McEnroe	6	5	4
3	(Germany) M Stich	4	6	6
(Netherlands) S Schalken	6	4	2
(France) A Boetsch	7^{9}	6^{5}	1
(United States) R Reneberg	6^{7}	7^{7}	6

Quarterfinals
1	(Russia) Y Kafelnikov	1	6^{5}
(Netherlands) P Haarhuis	6	7^{7}
3	(Germany) M Stich	6	6
(United States) R Reneberg	3	4

Semifinals
(Netherlands) P Haarhuis	6^{4}	1
3	(Germany) M Stich	7^{7}	6

=== Bottom half ===
First round
6	(Spain) A Berasategui	3	2
(Germany) M Sinner	6	6
(Canada) S Lareau	4	6^{2}
WC	(United States) J Connors	6	7^{7}
(Netherlands) J Siemerink	6	2	3
(France) O Delaître	3	6	6
(Russia) A Olhovskiy	4	5
4	(Switzerland) M Rosset	6	7
7	(Ukraine) A Medvedev	6^{1}	6	3
(Netherlands) J Eltingh	7^{7}	3	6
Q	(Netherlands) S Groen	6	6
Q	(North Macedonia) A Kitinov	2	1
(United States) V Spadea	4	4
(New Zealand) B Steven	6	6
Q	(Kenya) P Wekesa	3	6	3
2	(South Africa) W Ferreira	6	3	6

Second round
(Germany) M Sinner	6^{9}	0
WC	(United States) J Connors	7^{11}	6
(France) O Delaître	5	3
4	(Switzerland) M Rosset	7	6
(Netherlands) J Eltingh	6	7^{7}
Q	(Netherlands) S Groen	4	6^{5}
(New Zealand) B Steven	6	7^{7}
2	(South Africa) W Ferreira	1	6^{1}

Quarterfinals
WC	(United States) J Connors	6^{3}	3
4	(Switzerland) M Rosset	7^{7}	6
(Netherlands) J Eltingh	6	5	6
(New Zealand) B Steven	3	7	4

Semifinals
4	(Switzerland) M Rosset	7^{7}	7
(Netherlands) J Eltingh	6^{4}	5
