= 1993 Gerry Weber Open – Singles =

Singles
- 1993 Gerry Weber Open

Final
- Champion: (France) Henri Leconte
- Runner-up: (Ukraine) Andrei Medvedev
- Score: 6–2, 6–3

Details
- Draw: 32
- Seeds: 8

Events
Singles	Doubles
- Gerry Weber Open

This was the first edition of the event.

Henri Leconte won the title, beating Andrei Medvedev 6–2, 6–3 in the final.

== Seeds ==
1. (Ukraine) Andrei Medvedev (final)
2. (Czech Republic) Petr Korda (semifinals)
3. (United States) Michael Chang (first round)
4. (United States) Andre Agassi (first round)
5. (Russia) Alexander Volkov (first round)
6. (United States) Brad Gilbert (second round)
7. (South Africa) Marcos Ondruska (second round)
8. (Germany) Marc-Kevin Goellner (second round)

== Draw ==
Key

- Q = Qualifier
- WC = Wild card
- LL = Lucky loser
- Alt = Alternate
- ITF = ITF entry
- PR = Protected ranking
- SR = Special ranking
- SE = Special exempt
- JE = Junior exempt
- JR = Junior Accelerator Programme entrant
- CO = College Accelerator Programme entrant
- NG = Next Gen Accelerator Program entrant
- w/o = Walkover
- r = Retired
- d = Defaulted

=== Finals ===
Semifinals
1	(Ukraine) Andrei Medvedev	7	7^{7}
(United States) Jonathan Stark	5	6^{3}
(France) Henri Leconte	6	4	7
2	(Czech Republic) Petr Korda	3	6	5

Final
1	(Ukraine) Andrei Medvedev	2	3
(France) Henri Leconte	6	6

=== Top half ===
First round
1	(Ukraine) A Medvedev	7^{9}	6
(Netherlands) J Siemerink	6^{7}	3
(Germany) P Kühnen	3	6	6
(United States) D Rostagno	6	4	1
Q	(Netherlands) S Groen	6^{5}	0
(Sweden) J Svensson	7^{7}	6
Q	(United States) R Matuszewski	3	4
8	(Germany) M-K Goellner	6	6
4	(United States) A Agassi	7	2	1
(Germany) C-U Steeb	5	6	6
(Sweden) T Enqvist	4	2
(United States) J Stark	6	6
(Russia) A Cherkasov	6	4	2
WC	(Germany) H Dreekmann	4	6	6
(Denmark) K Carlsen	6^{3}	4
6	(United States) B Gilbert	7^{7}	6

Second round
1	(Ukraine) A Medvedev	4	6	6
(Germany) P Kühnen	6	3	3
(Sweden) J Svensson	7	7^{7}
8	(Germany) M-K Goellner	5	6^{4}
(Germany) C-U Steeb	3	4
(United States) J Stark	6	6
WC	(Germany) H Dreekmann	7^{7}	6^{5}	6
6	(United States) B Gilbert	6^{3}	7^{7}	4

Quarterfinals
1	(Ukraine) A Medvedev	5	6	6
(Sweden) J Svensson	7	3	4
(United States) J Stark	6	7^{7}
WC	(Germany) H Dreekmann	4	6^{5}

Semifinals
1	(Ukraine) A Medvedev	7	7^{7}
(United States) J Stark	5	6^{3}

=== Bottom half ===
First round
5	(Russia) A Volkov	7^{7}	2	3
(United States) A Krickstein	6^{3}	6	6
(France) H Leconte	6^{5}	6	6
(Netherlands) P Haarhuis	7^{7}	3	2
Q	(Germany) A Thoms	6^{2}	3
(United States) R Reneberg	7^{7}	6
(Germany) B Karbacher	6	3	6
3	(United States) M Chang	3	6	3
7	(South Africa) M Ondruska	6	6
WC	(Germany) R Nicklisch	0	2
(Austria) A Antonitsch	3	5
Q	(Germany) K Braasch	6	7
(Russia) A Olhovskiy	7^{7}	6
(Switzerland) J Hlasek	6^{3}	4
(United States) J Tarango	2	6	3
2	(Czech Republic) P Korda	6	3	6

Second round
(United States) A Krickstein	6	3	2
(France) H Leconte	4	6	6
(United States) R Reneberg	6	6
(Germany) B Karbacher	3	4
7	(South Africa) M Ondruska	4	6^{3}
Q	(Germany) K Braasch	6	7^{7}
(Russia) A Olhovskiy	2	3
2	(Czech Republic) P Korda	6	6

Quarterfinals
(France) H Leconte	6	3	7^{10}
(United States) R Reneberg	2	6	6^{8}
Q	(Germany) K Braasch	1	2
2	(Czech Republic) P Korda	6	6

Semifinals
(France) H Leconte	6	4	7
2	(Czech Republic) P Korda	3	6	5
