= 1993 Gerry Weber Open =

- Date: 14–21 June
- Edition: 1st
- Category: World Series
- Draw: 32S / 16D
- Prize money: $350,000
- Surface: Grass / outdoors
- Location: Halle, Germany
- Venue: Gerry Weber Stadion

Champions

Singles
- (France) Henri Leconte

Doubles
- (Czech Republic) Petr Korda / (Czech Republic) Cyril Suk
- Gerry Weber Open

The 1993 Gerry Weber Open was a men's tennis tournament played on outdoor grass courts. It was the inaugural edition of the Gerry Weber Open, and was part of the World Series of the 1993 ATP Tour. It took place at the Gerry Weber Stadion in Halle, North Rhine-Westphalia, Germany, from 14 June until 21 June 1993. Unseeded Henri Leconte won the singles title.

== Finals ==
=== Singles ===
(France) Henri Leconte defeated (Ukraine) Andrei Medvedev 6–2, 6–3

- It was Leconte's only singles title of the year and the 9th and last of his career.

=== Doubles ===
(Czech Republic) Petr Korda / (Czech Republic) Cyril Suk defeated (United States) Mike Bauer / (Germany) Marc-Kevin Goellner 7–6, 5–7, 6–3

- It was Korda's 2nd title of the year and the 13th of his career. It was Suk's first title of the year and the 7th of his career.
