= 1999 Gerry Weber Open =

- Date: 7–13 June
- Edition: 7th
- Category: World Series
- Draw: 32S / 16D
- Prize money: $875,000
- Surface: Grass / outdoors
- Location: Halle, Germany
- Venue: Gerry Weber Stadion

Champions

Singles
- (Germany) Nicolas Kiefer

Doubles
- (Sweden) Jonas Björkman / (Australia) Patrick Rafter
- Gerry Weber Open

The 1999 Gerry Weber Open was a men's tennis tournament played on outdoor grass courts. It was the 7th edition of the Gerry Weber Open, and was part of the World Series of the 1999 ATP Tour. It took place at the Gerry Weber Stadion in Halle, North Rhine-Westphalia, Germany, from 7 June through 13 June 1999. Seventh-seeded Nicolas Kiefer won the singles title.

== Finals ==
=== Singles ===
(Germany) Nicolas Kiefer defeated (Sweden) Nicklas Kulti 6–3, 6–2

- It was Kiefer's 2nd singles title of the year and the 3rd of his career.

=== Doubles ===
(Sweden) Jonas Björkman / (Australia) Patrick Rafter defeated (Netherlands) Paul Haarhuis / (United States) Jared Palmer 6–3, 7–5
