= 2000 Gerry Weber Open =

- Date: 12–18 June
- Edition: 8th
- Category: International Series
- Draw: 32S / 16D
- Prize money: $975,000
- Surface: Grass / outdoor
- Location: Halle, Germany
- Venue: Gerry Weber Stadion

Champions

Singles
- (Germany) David Prinosil

Doubles
- (Sweden) Nicklas Kulti / (Sweden) Mikael Tillström
- Gerry Weber Open

The 2000 Gerry Weber Open was a men's tennis tournament played on grass courts at the Gerry Weber Stadion in Halle, North Rhine-Westphalia in Germany and was part of the International Series of the 2000 ATP Tour. It was the 8th edition of the tournament and was held from 12 June through 18 June 2000. Unseeded David Prinosil, who received a wildcard for the main draw, won the singles title.

== Finals ==
=== Singles ===
(Germany) David Prinosil defeated (Netherlands) Richard Krajicek 6–3, 6–2

- It was Prinosil's only singles title of the year and the 3rd and last of his career.

=== Doubles ===
(Sweden) Nicklas Kulti / (Sweden) Mikael Tillström defeated (India) Mahesh Bhupathi / (Germany) David Prinosil 7–6^{(7–4)}, 7–6^{(7–4)}
