= Óscar Burrieza =

Spanish tennis player

Óscar Burrieza López
- Country (sports): Spain
- Residence: Lugo, Spain
- Born: 22 July 1975 (age 51) Lugo, Spain
- Height: 1.70 m (5 ft 7 in)
- Turned pro: 1994
- Plays: Right-handed (two-handed backhand)
- Prize money: US$319,190

Singles
- Career record: 4–17
- Career titles: 0
- Highest ranking: No. 126 (17 Nov 1997)

Grand Slam singles results
- Australian Open: 1R (1997)
- Wimbledon: 1R (1997)

Doubles
- Career record: 2–5
- Career titles: 0
- Highest ranking: No. 298 (3 Nov 1997)

Óscar Burrieza López (Spanish pronunciation: [ˈoskaɾ βuˈrjeθa ˈlopeθ]; (Note: In isolation, Burrieza is pronounced [buˈrjeθa].) born 22 July 1975) is a Spanish tennis coach, former professional tennis player and sports columnist for the sports newspaper Marca. Known as "the best Galician tennis player of all time."

== Career ==
Burrieza López struggled with injuries early in his career. In 1995 he required three operations on his left knee and on his Grand Slam debut, at the 1997 Australian Open, he had to retire after just four games against Richey Reneberg, having twisted his ankle.

The Spaniard lost in the opening round of the 1997 Wimbledon Championships, to Jason Stoltenberg .

He reached the quarter-finals of the 1998 Hong Kong Open.

In the 1999 Gerry Weber Open, Burrieza-Lopez had a win over world No. 39 Magnus Larsson. At the same tournament the following year, he defeated Karim Alami, then ranked No. 30 in the world. He subsequently faced Yevgeny Kafelnikov, then ranked No. 5, and blew two match points in a tight three-setter.

== Challenger titles ==
=== Singles: (1) ===
No.	Year	Tournament	Surface	Opponent	Score
1.	1997	Manchester, UK	Grass	(Italy) Stefano Pescosolido	7–6, 2–6, 6–1

=== Doubles: (1) ===
No.	Year	Tournament	Surface	Partner	Opponents	Score
1.	1997	Newcastle, UK	Clay	(Switzerland) Filippo Veglio	(France) Arnaud Clément (France) Rodolphe Gilbert	7–5, 4–0 RET
