= 2001 Gerry Weber Open – Singles =

Singles
- 2001 Gerry Weber Open

Final
- Champion: (Sweden) Thomas Johansson
- Runner-up: (France) Fabrice Santoro
- Score: 6–3, 6–7^{(5–7)}, 6–2

Details
- Draw: 32
- Seeds: 8

Events
Singles	Doubles
- Gerry Weber Open

David Prinosil was the defending champion but lost in the second round to Roger Federer.

Thomas Johansson won in the final 6–3, 6–7^{(5–7)}, 6–2 against Fabrice Santoro.

== Seeds ==
A champion seed is indicated in bold text while text in italics indicates the round in which that seed was eliminated.

1. (Russia) Yevgeny Kafelnikov (semifinals)
2. (Australia) Patrick Rafter (semifinals)
3. (France) Sébastien Grosjean (second round)
4. (France) Arnaud Clément (first round)
5. (Spain) Àlex Corretja (first round)
6. (Switzerland) Roger Federer (quarterfinals)
7. (Sweden) **Thomas Johansson (champion)**
8. (Germany) Tommy Haas (second round)

== Draw ==
Key

- Q = Qualifier
- WC = Wild card
- LL = Lucky loser
- Alt = Alternate
- ITF = ITF entry
- PR = Protected ranking
- SR = Special ranking
- SE = Special exempt
- JE = Junior exempt
- JR = Junior Accelerator Programme entrant
- CO = College Accelerator Programme entrant
- NG = Next Gen Accelerator Program entrant
- w/o = Walkover
- r = Retired
- d = Defaulted

=== Finals ===
Semifinals
1	(Russia) Yevgeny Kafelnikov	3	**6**	2
7	**(Sweden) Thomas Johansson**	**6**	5	**6**
**(France) Fabrice Santoro**	**7**	**6**
2	(Australia) Patrick Rafter	5	4

Final
7	**(Sweden) Thomas Johansson**	**6**	6^{5}	**6**
(France) Fabrice Santoro	3	**7^{7}**	2

=== Top half ===
First round
1	(Russia) **Y Kafelnikov**	**6**	4	**6**
Q	(Finland) T Ketola	3	**6**	2
(Germany) **R Schüttler**	**6**	**6**
(Ecuador) N Lapentti	4	4
(France) **N Escudé**	**6**	**6**
Q	(Canada) D Nestor	1	2
(Belarus) M Mirnyi	4	4
8	(Germany) **T Haas**	**6**	**6**
4	(France) A Clément	3	4
(Germany) **N Kiefer**	**6**	**6**
(Netherlands) S Schalken	1	4
(Sweden) **J Björkman**	**6**	**6**
(Spain) Á Calatrava	6^{5}	4
(Sweden) **M Larsson**	**7^{7}**	**6**
(United States) M Chang	2	5
7	(Sweden) **T Johansson**	**6**	**7**

Second round
1	(Russia) **Y Kafelnikov**	**6**	**6**
(Germany) R Schüttler	4	4
(France) **N Escudé**	**6**	**6**
8	(Germany) T Haas	3	4
(Germany) N Kiefer	6^{3}	**7^{7}**	6^{1}
(Sweden) **J Björkman**	**7^{7}**	6^{4}	**7^{7}**
(Sweden) M Larsson	5	5
7	(Sweden) **T Johansson**	**7**	**7**

Quarterfinals
1	(Russia) **Y Kafelnikov**	6^{2}	**7^{7}**	**7^{7}**
(France) N Escudé	**7^{7}**	6^{3}	6^{4}
(Sweden) J Björkman	4	2
7	(Sweden) **T Johansson**	**6**	**6**

Semifinals
1	(Russia) Y Kafelnikov	3	**7**	2
7	(Sweden) **T Johansson**	**6**	5	**6**

=== Bottom half ===
First round
5	(Spain) À Corretja	0	2
(France) **J Golmard**	**6**	**6**
Q	(France) C Saulnier	6^{2}	2
WC	(Germany) **L Burgsmüller**	**7^{7}**	**6**
WC	(Germany) A Popp	2	3
(France) **F Santoro**	**6**	**6**
Q	(Zimbabwe) W Black	**7**	3	1
3	(France) **S Grosjean**	5	**6**	**6**
6	(Switzerland) **R Federer**	6^{4}	**6**	**6**
(Spain) A Portas	**7^{7}**	4	2
(Germany) **D Prinosil**	**7^{7}**	**7^{7}**
WC	(Spain) C Moyá	6^{5}	6^{4}
(Romania) **A Pavel**	**6**	**6**
(Czech Republic) B Ulihrach	1	3
(Czech Republic) D Vacek	3	4
2	(Australia) **P Rafter**	**6**	**6**

Second round
(France) J Golmard	**6**	4	5
WC	(Germany) **L Burgsmüller**	4	**6**	**7**
(France) **F Santoro**	**7**	**7**
3	(France) S Grosjean	5	5
6	(Switzerland) **R Federer**	**7^{10}**	**7**
(Germany) D Prinosil	6^{8}	5
(Romania) A Pavel	3	3
2	(Australia) **P Rafter**	**6**	**6**

Quarterfinals
WC	(Germany) L Burgsmüller	6^{3}	4
(France) **F Santoro**	**7^{7}**	**6**
6	(Switzerland) R Federer	**6**	6^{6}	6^{4}
2	(Australia) **P Rafter**	4	**7^{8}**	**7^{7}**

Semifinals
(France) **F Santoro**	**7**	**6**
2	(Australia) P Rafter	5	4
