= 2005 Rafael Nadal tennis season =

Statistics for Spanish tennis player

- Full name: Rafael Nadal Parera
- Country: Spain
- Calendar prize money: $3,874,751 (Singles $3,794,327, Doubles $80,424)

Singles
- Season record: 79–10
- Calendar titles: 11
- Year-end ranking: No. 2
- Ranking change from previous year: ▲49

Grand Slam & significant results
- Australian Open: 4R
- French Open: W
- Wimbledon: 2R
- US Open: 3R

The 2005 Rafael Nadal tennis season is regarded as one of the greatest seasons of all time by a teenager. Nadal won a career-best 11 singles titles, including then-season-record 4 Masters 1000 titles and his maiden Grand Slam title at the French Open on his first attempt, making him the first teenager since Pete Sampras (1990 US Open) to win a major. He finished the year with 79 calendar match wins, the most by any teenager in ATP Tour history, and the world No. 2 ranking. He was awarded the ATP Most Improved Player of the Year award.

== Australian Open ==
At the 2005 Australian Open, Nadal lost in the fourth round to eventual runner-up Lleyton Hewitt.

== Hard court ==
Nadal reached the final of the 2005 Miami Masters, and despite being two points from a straight-sets victory, he was defeated in five sets by Roger Federer.

== Clay court ==
Nadal dominated the 2005 clay court season. He won 24 consecutive singles matches, which broke Andre Agassi's Open Era record of consecutive match wins for a male teenager. Nadal won the Torneo Conde de Godó in Barcelona and beat 2004 French Open runner-up Guillermo Coria in the finals of the 2005 Monte Carlo Masters and the 2005 Rome Masters. During the Rome quarterfinals against Radek Štěpánek, Nadal hit what is considered by many as the greatest shot of his career, a no-look, running passing shot near the net. These victories raised his ranking to world No. 5 and made him one of the favorites at his career-first French Open. On his 19th birthday, Nadal defeated Federer in the 2005 French Open semifinals, as one of only four players who defeated the world No. 1 that year (along with Marat Safin, Richard Gasquet, and David Nalbandian). Two days later, he defeated Mariano Puerta in the final, becoming the second male player after Mats Wilander to win the French Open on his first attempt. He also became the first male teenager to win a Grand Slam singles title since Pete Sampras won the 1990 US Open at age 19. Winning the French Open improved Nadal's ranking to world No. 3.

Reflecting on Puerta's confirmed doping during the 2005 final, Nadal later stated that as the rightful champion, he was not overly concerned by this revelation. He acknowledged, however, that Puerta's previous opponents may have felt robbed of their opportunity to compete fairly.

== Grass court ==
Three days after his victory in Paris, Nadal's 24-match winning streak was snapped in the first round of the grass court Gerry Weber Open in Halle, Germany, where he lost to the German Alexander Waske. He then lost in the second round of 2005 Wimbledon to Gilles Müller of Luxembourg.

== Summer hard court ==
Immediately after Wimbledon, Nadal won 16 consecutive matches and three consecutive tournaments, bringing his ranking to world No. 2 on 25 July 2005. Nadal started his North American summer hard-court season by defeating Agassi in the final of the 2005 Canada Masters, but lost in the first round of the 2005 Cincinnati Masters. Nadal was seeded second at the 2005 US Open, where he was upset in the third round by world No. 49 James Blake in four sets.

In September, he defeated Coria in the final of the China Open in Beijing and won both of his Davis Cup matches against Italy. In October, he won his fourth ATP Masters Series title of the year, defeating Ivan Ljubičić in the final of the 2005 Madrid Masters. He then suffered a foot injury and was diagnosed with Mueller–Weiss syndrome, which prevented him from competing at the Paris Masters and the year-ending Tennis Masters Cup.

Both Nadal and Federer won eleven singles titles and four ATP Masters Series titles in 2005. Nadal broke Mats Wilander's previous teenage record of nine in 1983. Eight of Nadal's titles were on clay, and the remainder were on hard courts. Nadal won 79 matches, second only to Federer's 81.

== Singles Matches ==
Tournament	Match	Round	Opponent	Rank	Result	Score
Qatar Open; Doha, Qatar; ATP World Tour 250; Hard, outdoor 3–9 January 2005	1 / 75	1R	(Russia) Mikhail Youzhny	16	Win	6–3, 7–6^{(7–3)}
Qatar Open; Doha, Qatar; ATP World Tour 250; Hard, outdoor 3–9 January 2005	2 / 76	2R	(Spain) Fernando Verdasco	36	Win	6–2, 6–4
Qatar Open; Doha, Qatar; ATP World Tour 250; Hard, outdoor 3–9 January 2005	3 / 77	QF	(Croatia) Ivan Ljubičić	22	Loss	2–6, 7–6^{(3–7)}, 3–6
Heineken Open; Auckland, New Zealand; ATP World Tour 250; Hard, outdoor 10–16 January 2005	4 / 78	1R	(Slovakia) Dominik Hrbatý	20	Loss	3–6 RET
Australian Open; Melbourne, Australia; Grand Slam; Hard, outdoor 17–30 January 2005	5 / 79	1R	(France) Julien Benneteau	65	Win	6–0, 6–4, 6–2
Australian Open; Melbourne, Australia; Grand Slam; Hard, outdoor 17–30 January 2005	6 / 80	2R	(Russia) Mikhail Youzhny	15	Win	6–1, 4–6, 4–6, 7–5, 6–3
Australian Open; Melbourne, Australia; Grand Slam; Hard, outdoor 17–30 January 2005	7 / 81	3R	(United States) Bobby Reynolds	283	Win	6–1, 6–1, 6–3
Australian Open; Melbourne, Australia; Grand Slam; Hard, outdoor 17–30 January 2005	8 / 82	4R	(Australia) Lleyton Hewitt	3	Loss	5–7, 6–3, 6–1, 6–7^{(3–7)}, 2–6
ATP Buenos Aires; Buenos aires, Argentina; ATP World Tour 250; Clay, outdoor 7–13 February 2005	9 / 83	1R	(Argentina) Agustín Calleri	61	Win	7–6^{(7–2)}, 6–3
ATP Buenos Aires; Buenos aires, Argentina; ATP World Tour 250; Clay, outdoor 7–13 February 2005	10 / 84	2R	(Italy) Potito Starace	66	Win	6–1, 6–3
ATP Buenos Aires; Buenos aires, Argentina; ATP World Tour 250; Clay, outdoor 7–13 February 2005	11 / 85	QF	(Argentina) Gastón Gaudio	8	Loss	6–0, 0–6, 1–6
Brasil Open; São Paulo, Brazil; ATP World Tour 250; Clay, outdoor 15–20 February 2005	12 / 86	1R	(Argentina) José Acasuso	55	Win	7–6^{(7–1)}, 6–3
Brasil Open; São Paulo, Brazil; ATP World Tour 250; Clay, outdoor 15–20 February 2005	13 / 87	2R	(Spain) Álex Calatrava	86	Win	6–3, 6–3
Brasil Open; São Paulo, Brazil; ATP World Tour 250; Clay, outdoor 15–20 February 2005	14 / 88	QF	(Argentina) Agustín Calleri	60	Win	6–2, 6–7^{(5–7)}, 6–4
Brasil Open; São Paulo, Brazil; ATP World Tour 250; Clay, outdoor 15–20 February 2005	15 / 89	SF	(Brazil) Ricardo Mello	56	Win	2–6, 6–2, 6–4
Brasil Open; São Paulo, Brazil; ATP World Tour 250; Clay, outdoor 15–20 February 2005	16 / 90	W	(Spain) Alberto Martín	61	Win (1)	6–0, 6–7^{(2–7)}, 6–1
Abierto Mexicano Telcel; Acapulco, Mexico; ATP World Tour 500; Clay, outdoor 21–27 February 2005	17 / 91	1R	(Spain) Álex Calatrava	81	Win	6–4, 6–4
Abierto Mexicano Telcel; Acapulco, Mexico; ATP World Tour 500; Clay, outdoor 21–27 February 2005	18 / 92	2R	(Spain) Santiago Ventura	77	Win	7–6, 6–2
Abierto Mexicano Telcel; Acapulco, Mexico; ATP World Tour 500; Clay, outdoor 21–27 February 2005	19 / 93	QF	(Argentina) Guillermo Cañas	12	Win	7–5, 6–3
Abierto Mexicano Telcel; Acapulco, Mexico; ATP World Tour 500; Clay, outdoor 21–27 February 2005	20 / 94	SF	(Argentina) Mariano Puerta	74	Win	6–4, 6–1
Abierto Mexicano Telcel; Acapulco, Mexico; ATP World Tour 500; Clay, outdoor 21–27 February 2005	21 / 95	W	(Spain) Albert Montañés	95	Win (2)	6–1, 6–0
Miami Open; Key Biscayne, United States; ATP World Tour Masters 1000; Hard, outdoor 21 March – 3 April 2005	–	1R	Bye			
Miami Open; Key Biscayne, United States; ATP World Tour Masters 1000; Hard, outdoor 21 March – 3 April 2005	22 / 96	2R	(Germany) Rainer Schüttler	39	Win	6–4, 7–6^{(7–5)}
Miami Open; Key Biscayne, United States; ATP World Tour Masters 1000; Hard, outdoor 21 March – 3 April 2005	23 / 97	3R	(Spain) Fernando Verdasco	45	Win	6–2, 6–2
Miami Open; Key Biscayne, United States; ATP World Tour Masters 1000; Hard, outdoor 21 March – 3 April 2005	24 / 98	4R	(Croatia) Ivan Ljubičić	14	Win	6–4, 6–7^{(5–7)}, 6–3
Miami Open; Key Biscayne, United States; ATP World Tour Masters 1000; Hard, outdoor 21 March – 3 April 2005	25 / 99	QF	(Sweden) Thomas Johansson	27	Win	6–2, 6–4
Miami Open; Key Biscayne, United States; ATP World Tour Masters 1000; Hard, outdoor 21 March – 3 April 2005	26 / 100	SF	(Spain) David Ferrer	44	Win	6–4, 6–3
Miami Open; Key Biscayne, United States; ATP World Tour Masters 1000; Hard, outdoor 21 March – 3 April 2005	27 / 101	F	(Switzerland) Roger Federer	1	Loss (1)	6–2, 7–6^{(7–4)}, 6–7^{(5–7)}, 3–6, 1–6
Open de Tenis Comunidad Valenciana; Valencia, Spain; ATP World Tour 250; Clay, outdoor 4–10 April 2005	28 / 102	1R	(Spain) Juan Carlos Ferrero	68	Win	6–2, 6–1
Open de Tenis Comunidad Valenciana; Valencia, Spain; ATP World Tour 250; Clay, outdoor 4–10 April 2005	29 / 103	2R	(Spain) Guillermo García López	80	Win	6–1, 6–4
Open de Tenis Comunidad Valenciana; Valencia, Spain; ATP World Tour 250; Clay, outdoor 4–10 April 2005	30 / 104	QF	(Russia) Igor Andreev	47	Loss	5–7, 2–6
Monte Carlo Masters; Monte Carlo, Monaco; ATP World Tour Masters 1000; Clay, outdoor 11–17 April 2005	31 / 105	1R	(France) Gaël Monfils	106	Win	6–3, 6–2
Monte Carlo Masters; Monte Carlo, Monaco; ATP World Tour Masters 1000; Clay, outdoor 11–17 April 2005	32 / 106	2R	(Belgium) Xavier Malisse	38	Win	6–0, 6–3
Monte Carlo Masters; Monte Carlo, Monaco; ATP World Tour Masters 1000; Clay, outdoor 11–17 April 2005	33 / 107	3R	(Belgium) Olivier Rochus	42	Win	6–1, 6–2
Monte Carlo Masters; Monte Carlo, Monaco; ATP World Tour Masters 1000; Clay, outdoor 11–17 April 2005	34 / 108	QF	(Argentina) Gastón Gaudio	6	Win	6–3, 6–0
Monte Carlo Masters; Monte Carlo, Monaco; ATP World Tour Masters 1000; Clay, outdoor 11–17 April 2005	35 / 109	SF	(France) Richard Gasquet	101	Win	6–7^{(6–8)}, 6–4, 6–3
Monte Carlo Masters; Monte Carlo, Monaco; ATP World Tour Masters 1000; Clay, outdoor 11–17 April 2005	36 / 110	W	(Argentina) Guillermo Coria	9	Win (3)	6–3, 6–1, 0–6, 7–5
Torneo Godo; Barcelona, Spain; ATP World Tour 500; Clay, outdoor 18–24 April 2005	–	1R	Bye			
Torneo Godo; Barcelona, Spain; ATP World Tour 500; Clay, outdoor 18–24 April 2005	37 / 111	2R	(Luxembourg) Gilles Müller	64	Win	6–0, 6–2
Torneo Godo; Barcelona, Spain; ATP World Tour 500; Clay, outdoor 18–24 April 2005	38 / 112	3R	(Slovakia) Dominik Hrbatý	25	Win	6–1, 6–2
Torneo Godo; Barcelona, Spain; ATP World Tour 500; Clay, outdoor 18–24 April 2005	39 / 113	QF	(Argentina) Agustín Calleri	99	Win	6–2, 3–0 RET
Torneo Godo; Barcelona, Spain; ATP World Tour 500; Clay, outdoor 18–24 April 2005	40 / 114	SF	(Czech Republic) Radek Štěpánek	22	Win	7–5, 6–2
Torneo Godo; Barcelona, Spain; ATP World Tour 500; Clay, outdoor 18–24 April 2005	41 / 115	W	(Spain) Juan Carlos Ferrero	58	Win (4)	6–1, 7–6^{(7–4)}, 6–3
Internazionali BNL d'Italia; Rome, Italy; ATP World Tour Masters 1000; Clay, outdoor 2–8 May 2005	42 / 116	1R	(Russia) Mikhail Youzhny	26	Win	6–0, 6–2
Internazionali BNL d'Italia; Rome, Italy; ATP World Tour Masters 1000; Clay, outdoor 2–8 May 2005	43 / 117	2R	(Romania) Victor Hănescu	85	Win	6–1, 6–1
Internazionali BNL d'Italia; Rome, Italy; ATP World Tour Masters 1000; Clay, outdoor 2–8 May 2005	44 / 118	3R	(Argentina) Guillermo Cañas	13	Win	6–3, 6–1
Internazionali BNL d'Italia; Rome, Italy; ATP World Tour Masters 1000; Clay, outdoor 2–8 May 2005	45 / 119	QF	(Czech Republic) Radek Štěpánek	17	Win	5–7, 6–1, 6–1
Internazionali BNL d'Italia; Rome, Italy; ATP World Tour Masters 1000; Clay, outdoor 2–8 May 2005	46 / 120	SF	(Spain) David Ferrer	25	Win	4–6, 6–4, 7–5
Internazionali BNL d'Italia; Rome, Italy; ATP World Tour Masters 1000; Clay, outdoor 2–8 May 2005	47 / 121	W	(Argentina) Guillermo Coria	11	Win (5)	6–4, 3–6, 6–3, 4–6, 7–6^{(8–6)}
French Open; Paris, France; Grand Slam; Clay, outdoor 23 May – 5 June 2005	48 / 122	1R	(Germany) Lars Burgsmüller	96	Win	6–1, 7–6^{(7–4)}, 6–1
French Open; Paris, France; Grand Slam; Clay, outdoor 23 May – 5 June 2005	49 / 123	2R	(Belgium) Xavier Malisse	46	Win	6–2, 6–2, 6–4
French Open; Paris, France; Grand Slam; Clay, outdoor 23 May – 5 June 2005	50 / 124	3R	(France) Richard Gasquet	31	Win	6–4, 6–3, 6–2
French Open; Paris, France; Grand Slam; Clay, outdoor 23 May – 5 June 2005	51 / 125	4R	(France) Sébastien Grosjean	24	Win	6–4, 3–6, 6–0, 6–3
French Open; Paris, France; Grand Slam; Clay, outdoor 23 May – 5 June 2005	52 / 126	QF	(Spain) David Ferrer	21	Win	7–5, 6–2, 6–0
French Open; Paris, France; Grand Slam; Clay, outdoor 23 May – 5 June 2005	53 / 127	SF	(Switzerland) Roger Federer	1	Win	6–3, 4–6, 6–4, 6–3
French Open; Paris, France; Grand Slam; Clay, outdoor 23 May – 5 June 2005	54 / 128	W	(Argentina) Mariano Puerta	37	Win (6)	6–7^{(6–8)}, 6–3, 6–1, 7–5
Gerry Weber Open; Halle, Germany; ATP World Tour 250; Grass, outdoor 6–12 June 2005	55 / 129	1R	(Germany) Alexander Waske	147	Loss	6–4, 5–7, 3–6
The Championships, Wimbledon; Wimbledon, United Kingdom; Grand Slam; Grass, outdoor 20 June – 3 July 2005	56 / 130	1R	(United States) Vincent Spadea	39	Win	6–4, 6–3, 6–2
The Championships, Wimbledon; Wimbledon, United Kingdom; Grand Slam; Grass, outdoor 20 June – 3 July 2005	57 / 131	2R	(Luxembourg) Gilles Müller	69	Loss	4–6, 6–4, 3–6, 4–6
Swedish Open; Båstad, Sweden; ATP World Tour 250; Clay, outdoor 4–10 July 2005	58 / 132	1R	(Argentina) Juan Mónaco	66	Win	6–1, 6–1
Swedish Open; Båstad, Sweden; ATP World Tour 250; Clay, outdoor 4–10 July 2005	59 / 133	2R	(Spain) Alberto Martín	50	Win	6–2, 6–4
Swedish Open; Båstad, Sweden; ATP World Tour 250; Clay, outdoor 4–10 July 2005	60 / 134	QF	(Spain) Juan Carlos Ferrero	31	Win	6–3, 6–3
Swedish Open; Båstad, Sweden; ATP World Tour 250; Clay, outdoor 4–10 July 2005	61 / 135	SF	(Spain) Tommy Robredo	20	Win	6–3, 6–3
Swedish Open; Båstad, Sweden; ATP World Tour 250; Clay, outdoor 4–10 July 2005	62 / 136	W	(Czech Republic) Tomáš Berdych	20	Win (7)	2–6, 6–2, 6–4
Stuttgart Open; Stuttgart, Germany; ATP World Tour 500; Clay, outdoor 18–24 July 2005	–	1R	Bye			
Stuttgart Open; Stuttgart, Germany; ATP World Tour 500; Clay, outdoor 18–24 July 2005	63 / 137	2R	(United States) Hugo Armando	167	Win	6–1, 6–2
Stuttgart Open; Stuttgart, Germany; ATP World Tour 500; Clay, outdoor 18–24 July 2005	64 / 138	3R	(Spain) Fernando Verdasco	58	Win	6–3, 6–2
Stuttgart Open; Stuttgart, Germany; ATP World Tour 500; Clay, outdoor 18–24 July 2005	65 / 139	QF	(Czech Republic) Tomáš Zíb	57	Win	4–6, 6–4, 6–3
Stuttgart Open; Stuttgart, Germany; ATP World Tour 500; Clay, outdoor 18–24 July 2005	66 / 140	SF	(Finland) Jarkko Nieminen	66	Win	6–2, 7–5
Stuttgart Open; Stuttgart, Germany; ATP World Tour 500; Clay, outdoor 18–24 July 2005	67 / 141	W	(Argentina) Gastón Gaudio	13	Win (8)	6–3, 6–3, 6–4
Rogers Cup; Montreal, Canada; ATP World Tour Masters 1000; Hard, outdoor 8–14 August 2005	68 / 142	1R	(Spain) Carlos Moyá	32	Win	6–3, 6–7, 6–3
Rogers Cup; Montreal, Canada; ATP World Tour Masters 1000; Hard, outdoor 8–14 August 2005	69 / 143	2R	(Brazil) Ricardo Mello	56	Win	6–1, 6–2
Rogers Cup; Montreal, Canada; ATP World Tour Masters 1000; Hard, outdoor 8–14 August 2005	70 / 144	3R	(France) Sébastien Grosjean	34	Win	6–4, 6–4
Rogers Cup; Montreal, Canada; ATP World Tour Masters 1000; Hard, outdoor 8–14 August 2005	71 / 145	QF	(Argentina) Mariano Puerta	11	Win	6–3, 6–1
Rogers Cup; Montreal, Canada; ATP World Tour Masters 1000; Hard, outdoor 8–14 August 2005	72 / 146	SF	(France) Paul-Henri Mathieu	63	Win	6–4, 7–5
Rogers Cup; Montreal, Canada; ATP World Tour Masters 1000; Hard, outdoor 8–14 August 2005	73 / 147	W	(United States) Andre Agassi	7	Win (9)	6–3, 4–6, 6–2
Cincinnati Masters; Ohio, United States; ATP World Tour Masters 1000; Hard, outdoor 15–21 August 2005	74 / 148	1R	(Czech Republic) Tomáš Berdych	36	Loss	7–6^{(7–4)}, 2–6, 6–7^{(3–7)}
US Open; Melbourne, Australia; Grand Slam; Hard, outdoor 29 August – 11 September 2005	75 / 149	1R	(United States) Bobby Reynolds	132	Win	6–3, 6–3, 6–4
US Open; Melbourne, Australia; Grand Slam; Hard, outdoor 29 August – 11 September 2005	76 / 150	2R	(United States) Scoville Jenkins	352	Win	6–4, 7–5, 6–4
US Open; Melbourne, Australia; Grand Slam; Hard, outdoor 29 August – 11 September 2005	77 / 151	3R	(United States) James Blake	49	Loss	4–6, 6–4, 3–6, 1–6
China Open; Beijing, China; ATP World Tour 250; Hard, outdoor 12–18 September 2005	78 / 152	1R	(Taiwan) Jimmy Wang	100	Win	6–2, 6–4
China Open; Beijing, China; ATP World Tour 250; Hard, outdoor 12–18 September 2005	79 / 153	2R	(United States) Justin Gimelstob	95	Win	5–7, 6–4, 6–4
China Open; Beijing, China; ATP World Tour 250; Hard, outdoor 12–18 September 2005	80 / 154	QF	(Netherlands) Peter Wessels	115	Win	7–6^{(7–3)}, 6–2
China Open; Beijing, China; ATP World Tour 250; Hard, outdoor 12–18 September 2005	81 / 155	SF	(Spain) Juan Carlos Ferrero	23	Win	6–4, 6–4
China Open; Beijing, China; ATP World Tour 250; Hard, outdoor 12–18 September 2005	82 / 156	W	(Argentina) Guillermo Coria	8	Win (10)	5–7, 6–1, 6–2
Davis Cup, ITA v/s ESP World Group Play Offs; Italy; Davis Cup; Clay, outdoor 19–25 September 2005	83 / 157	RR	(Italy) Daniele Bracciali	69	Win	6–3, 6–2, 6–1
Davis Cup, ITA v/s ESP World Group Play Offs; Italy; Davis Cup; Clay, outdoor 19–25 September 2005	84 / 158	RR	(Italy) Andreas Seppi	78	Win	6–1, 6–2, 5–7, 6–4
Madrid Open; Madrid, Spain; ATP World Tour Masters 1000; Hard, indoor 17–23 October 2005	–	1R	Bye			
Madrid Open; Madrid, Spain; ATP World Tour Masters 1000; Hard, indoor 17–23 October 2005	85 / 159	2R	(Romania) Victor Hănescu	42	Win	7–6^{(7–5)}, 6–3
Madrid Open; Madrid, Spain; ATP World Tour Masters 1000; Hard, indoor 17–23 October 2005	86 / 160	3R	(Spain) Tommy Robredo	17	Win	6–2, 6–4
Madrid Open; Madrid, Spain; ATP World Tour Masters 1000; Hard, indoor 17–23 October 2005	87 / 161	QF	(Czech Republic) Radek Štěpánek	14	Win	7–6^{(11–9)}, 6–4
Madrid Open; Madrid, Spain; ATP World Tour Masters 1000; Hard, indoor 17–23 October 2005	88 / 162	SF	(United States) Robby Ginepri	21	Win	7–5, 7–6^{(7–1)}
Madrid Open; Madrid, Spain; ATP World Tour Masters 1000; Hard, indoor 17–23 October 2005	89 / 163	W	(Croatia) Ivan Ljubičić	7	Win (11)	3–6, 2–6, 6–3, 6–4, 7–6^{(7–3)}

== See also ==
- 2005 ATP Tour
- 2005 Roger Federer tennis season
