= 2005 Gerry Weber Open – Singles =

Singles
- 2005 Gerry Weber Open

Final
- Champion: (Switzerland) Roger Federer
- Runner-up: (Russia) Marat Safin
- Score: 6–4, 6–7^{(6–8)}, 6–4

Details
- Draw: 32
- Seeds: 8

Events
Singles	Doubles
- Gerry Weber Open

Roger Federer was the two-time defending champion, and won in the final 6–4, 6–7^{(6–8)}, 6–4, against Marat Safin. With this victory, Federer equalled Yevgeny Kafelnikov's record for three singles titles in Halle; and he became the first to win three consecutive singles titles at the tournament. Federer also won the doubles title, partnering Yves Allegro.

== Seeds ==
1. (Switzerland) Roger Federer (champion)
2. (Russia) Marat Safin (final)
3. (Spain) Rafael Nadal (first round)
4. (Argentina) Guillermo Cañas (semifinals)
5. (Argentina) David Nalbandian (first round)
6. (Sweden) Joachim Johansson (first round)
7. (Germany) Tommy Haas (semifinals)
8. (Spain) Feliciano López (second round)

== Draw ==
Key

- Q = Qualifier
- WC = Wild card
- LL = Lucky loser
- Alt = Alternate
- ITF = ITF entry
- PR = Protected ranking
- SR = Special ranking
- SE = Special exempt
- JE = Junior exempt
- JR = Junior Accelerator Programme entrant
- CO = College Accelerator Programme entrant
- NG = Next Gen Accelerator Program entrant
- w/o = Walkover
- r = Retired
- d = Defaulted

=== Finals ===
Semifinals
1	(Switzerland) Roger Federer	6	7^{11}
7	(Germany) Tommy Haas	4	6^{9}
4	(Argentina) Guillermo Cañas	3	6	2
2	(Russia) Marat Safin	6	4	6

Final
1	(Switzerland) Roger Federer	6	6^{6}	6
2	(Russia) Marat Safin	4	7^{8}	4

=== Top half ===
First round
1	(Switzerland) R Federer	6^{5}	7^{8}	6
(Sweden) R Söderling	7^{7}	6^{6}	4
(Russia) M Youzhny	4	6^{4}
(Germany) F Mayer	6	7^{7}
(France) M Llodra	6^{2}	7^{8}	2
Q	(Chinese Taipei) Y-t Wang	7^{7}	6^{6}	6
(Germany) P Kohlschreiber	7^{7}	6
6	(Sweden) J Johansson	6^{4}	1
3	(Spain) R Nadal	6	5	3
WC	(Germany) A Waske	4	7	6
Q	(Belarus) V Voltchkov	7^{7}	4	4
WC	(Spain) JC Ferrero	6^{5}	6	6
(Austria) J Melzer	7	6^{3}	7^{7}
(Spain) A Martín	5	7^{7}	6^{3}
(Czech Republic) J Vaněk	4	1
7	(Germany) T Haas	6	6

Second round
1	(Switzerland) R Federer	6	6
(Germany) F Mayer	2	4
Q	(Chinese Taipei) Y-t Wang	2	7	6^{6}
(Germany) P Kohlschreiber	6	5	7^{8}
WC	(Germany) A Waske	6^{5}	7^{9}	3
WC	(Spain) JC Ferrero	7^{7}	6^{7}	6
(Austria) J Melzer	2	6	4
7	(Germany) T Haas	6	3	6

Quarterfinals
1	(Switzerland) R Federer	6	6
(Germany) P Kohlschreiber	3	4
WC	(Spain) JC Ferrero	2	5
7	(Germany) T Haas	6	7

Semifinals
1	(Switzerland) R Federer	6	7^{11}
7	(Germany) T Haas	4	6^{9}

=== Bottom half ===
First round
5	(Argentina) D Nalbandian	3	3
(Germany) R Schüttler	6	6
(Belgium) C Rochus	4	6	1
Q	(Belgium) D Norman	6	3	6
(Germany) N Kiefer	7^{7}	3	4
Q	(Serbia and Montenegro) N Zimonjić	6^{1}	6	6
(Spain) F Verdasco	4	4
4	(Argentina) G Cañas	6	6
8	(Spain) F López	7^{7}	7^{7}
(Denmark) K Carlsen	6^{3}	6^{5}
(France) C Saulnier	4	4
(Belgium) O Rochus	6	6
(Romania) A Pavel	5	2
(France) F Santoro	7	6
WC	(Germany) A Popp	3	2
2	(Russia) M Safin	6	6

Second round
(Germany) R Schüttler	6	6
Q	(Belgium) D Norman	3	3
Q	(Serbia and Montenegro) N Zimonjić	3	6^{3}
4	(Argentina) G Cañas	6	7^{7}
8	(Spain) F López	6^{2}	3
(Belgium) O Rochus	7^{7}	6
(France) F Santoro	6	6^{7}	2^{r}
2	(Russia) M Safin	3	7^{9}	3

Quarterfinals
(Germany) R Schüttler	4	4
4	(Argentina) G Cañas	6	6
(Belgium) O Rochus	4	6^{4}
2	(Russia) M Safin	6	7^{7}

Semifinals
4	(Argentina) G Cañas	3	6	2
2	(Russia) M Safin	6	4	6
