= 2005 Gerry Weber Open – Doubles =

Doubles
- 2005 Gerry Weber Open

Final
- Champions: (Switzerland) Yves Allegro (Switzerland) Roger Federer
- Runners-up: (Sweden) Joachim Johansson (Russia) Marat Safin
- Score: 7–5, 6–7^{(6–8)}, 6–3

Details
- Draw: 16
- Seeds: 4

Events
Singles	Doubles
← 2004 ·	Gerry Weber Open	· 2006 →

Leander Paes and David Rikl were the defending champions, but chose not to participate that year.

Yves Allegro and Roger Federer won in the final 7–5, 6–7^{(6–8)}, 6–3, against Joachim Johansson and Marat Safin. Federer also won the singles title.

== Seeds ==
1. (India) Mahesh Bhupathi / (Australia) Todd Woodbridge (quarterfinals, retired)
2. (France) Michaël Llodra / (France) Fabrice Santoro (quarterfinals, withdrew)
3. (Czech Republic) Cyril Suk / (Czech Republic) Pavel Vízner (first round)
4. (Israel) Jonathan Erlich / (Israel) Andy Ram (first round)

== Draw ==
=== Key ===
- Q = Qualifier
- WC = Wild card
- LL = Lucky loser
- Alt = Alternate
- SE = Special exempt
- PR = Protected ranking
- ITF = ITF entry
- JE = Junior exempt
- w/o = Walkover
- r = Retired
- d = Defaulted
- SR = Special ranking

=== Draw ===
First round
1	(India) M Bhupathi (Australia) T Woodbridge	6	6
(Austria) J Knowle (Austria) J Melzer	3	4
(Spain) F López (Spain) R Nadal
WC	(Germany) N Kiefer (Germany) A Waske	w/o
4	(Israel) J Erlich (Israel) A Ram	3	3
(Argentina) G Cañas (Argentina) D Nalbandian	6	6
(Czech Republic) M Damm (Romania) A Pavel	3	7	3
(Switzerland) Y Allegro (Switzerland) R Federer	6	5	6
(Sweden) J Johansson (Russia) M Safin	6	6
ALT	(Italy) A Seppi (Italy) U Vico	2	4
(Germany) T Haas (Serbia and Montenegro) N Zimonjić	7^{7}	6
3	(Czech Republic) C Suk (Czech Republic) P Vízner	6^{5}	3
(Czech Republic) J Novák (Czech Republic) P Pála	7^{7}	6
(Belgium) C Rochus (Belgium) O Rochus	6^{1}	2
WC	(Germany) M Kohlmann (Germany) R Schüttler	4	4
2	(France) M Llodra (France) F Santoro	6	6

Quarterfinals
1	(India) M Bhupathi (Australia) T Woodbridge	w/o
WC	(Germany) N Kiefer (Germany) A Waske
(Argentina) G Cañas (Argentina) D Nalbandian
(Switzerland) Y Allegro (Switzerland) R Federer	w/o
(Sweden) J Johansson (Russia) M Safin	7	7^{7}
(Germany) T Haas (Serbia and Montenegro) N Zimonjić	5	6^{2}
(Czech Republic) J Novák (Czech Republic) P Pála	w/o
2	(France) M Llodra (France) F Santoro

Semifinals
1	(India) M Bhupathi (Australia) T Woodbridge	5	r
(Switzerland) Y Allegro (Switzerland) R Federer	7
(Sweden) J Johansson (Russia) M Safin	w/o
(Czech Republic) J Novák (Czech Republic) P Pála

Final
(Switzerland) Y Allegro (Switzerland) R Federer	7	6^{6}	6
(Sweden) J Johansson (Russia) M Safin	5	7^{8}	3
