= 2005 Roger Federer tennis season =

Statistics for Swiss tennis player

- Calendar prize money: $6,137,018

Singles
- Season record: 81–4 (95.29%)
- Calendar titles: 11
- Year-end ranking: No. 1
- Ranking change from previous year: =

Grand Slam & significant results
- Australian Open: SF
- French Open: SF
- Wimbledon: W
- US Open: W
- Other tournaments
- Tour Finals: F

Davis Cup
- Davis Cup: WG PO (adv. to 2006 WG)

Roger Federer contested two major finals in 2005, winning both at Wimbledon over Andy Roddick, 6–2, 7–6(2), 6–4, and the US Open over Andre Agassi, 6–3, 2–6, 7–6(1), 6–1. However, Federer failed to make the final at the other two majors, losing in the semifinals of the Australian Open to Marat Safin and the French Open to Rafael Nadal. Nevertheless, Federer won four Masters titles at Indian Wells, Miami, and Cincinnati on hard courts and one clay court title at Hamburg. Furthermore, Federer won two ATP 500 series events at Rotterdam and Dubai. Federer lost the year-end championships to David Nalbandian in the final.

== Year summary ==
Dubbed "Fed05" this season is considered to be one of the greatest performances by a male tennis player and is statistically one of the most dominant in the Open Era. He won 11 singles titles which tied his 2004 season as the most in over two decades, his 81 match victories were the most since Pete Sampras in 1993, and his record of 81–4 (95.2%) remains the third best winning percentage in the Open Era behind only John McEnroe in 1984 and Jimmy Connors in 1974.

=== Early hard court season ===
At the start of the year, Federer hired former Australian player Tony Roche to coach him on a limited basis. Federer began the year with a debut appearance at the Qatar Open where he defeated Croatian Ivan Ljubičić in the final. Federer dominated the field and for the first time in his career won a tournament without ever dropping his serve.

Federer entered the first Grand Slam of the year on a 21-match winning streak that stretched over a five-month period. Federer swept through the first five rounds of the Australian Open without dropping a set, including a quarterfinal straight set win over Andre Agassi. He reached the semifinals in a repeat of the previous year's final, before falling to eventual winner Marat Safin, 7–5, 4–6, 7–5, 6–7(6), 7–9. Federer had held a match point at 6–5 in the fourth-set tiebreaker and rushed the net, however Safin responded with a lob; Federer rushed back to retrieve the ball and hit an aggressive between-the-legs trick shot which failed to clear the net. Safin went on to win the tiebreaker and the 80-minute fifth set.

Federer pulled out of the first round of Davis Cup for the first time in his career and would not participate again in the World Group until 2012. Federer next entered the Rotterdam Open seeking his first title in the Netherlands after making the final in 2001. In the second round he played Swiss compatriot and future Grand Slam champion Stan Wawrinka, easily defeating the teenager in straight sets. In the final he again played Ljubicic, who pushed Federer to the limit, with the Swiss prevailing in a final-set tiebreaker.

Federer next flew to the Middle East, where he was the two-time defending champion at the prestigious Dubai Tennis Championships. Federer and Agassi attracted worldwide headlines with a publicity stunt that saw the two tennis legends play on a helipad almost 700 feet above sea level at the world-famous seven-star luxury hotel the Burj al-Arab. Federer fought through final-set tiebreakers in his first two matches, the second of which, against former world number one Juan Carlos Ferrero, saw Federer fend off a match point. Federer went on to defeat Agassi in the semifinals and defeated a red-hot Ljubicic in a third final of the young season. This was the first tournament that Federer was able to win three times, and consequently it was also the first he was able to win three times consecutively.

Federer continued to dominate with the commencement of the Masters series. Federer flew from one desert to another and arrived at the Indian Wells Masters in California as the defending champion. He played Ljubicic for the fourth time in five tournaments, again defeating the streaking Croat. In the finals Federer faced the number two player in the world and twice former champion Lleyton Hewitt, easily defeating the Australian in straight sets.

Federer next arrived in the luxury island resort of Key Biscayne seeking his first victory at the Miami Open. Federer reached the finals beating top ten players Tim Henman and Andre Agassi along the way. In the championship match Federer met the player who had knocked him out of Miami the previous year, an 18-year-old Spaniard named Rafael Nadal. Nadal showed why he would become Federer's top rival over the next decade by sweeping the opening two sets. Federer responded by winning a third-set tiebreaker and going on to win the championship in a five set epic 2–6, 6–7(4), 7–6(5), 6–3, 6–1, after being down two sets to love, and two points from defeat. The victory made Federer only sixth man to complete the Indian Wells/Miami "double" and the first since Agassi in 2001. With this victory Federer had won 8 of the last 10 Masters tournaments he had entered.

Federer compiled an astounding 27–1 record in the early hard court season with 5 titles.

=== Clay court season ===
Federer next transitioned to the clay courts of the Monte-Carlo Masters, entering the tournament for the first time since 2002. His 25-match winning streak was halted in the quarterfinals by 18 year old Frenchman Richard Gasquet who survived three match points and a final-set tiebreaker to defeat the world number one.

Federer skipped the Rome Masters, instead taking three weeks off to treat tendonitis in his feet that had troubled him since the Australian Open.

He won his third Hamburg Masters clay-court title in May by defeating Gasquet without the loss of a set throughout the tournament.

After his victory in Germany Federer flew to Lisbon, Portugal to attend the Laureus Awards. Federer won the prestigious award for "World Sportsman of the Year" and was presented with the Cartier trophy by Cuba Gooding Jr. and Martina Navratilova before a television audience estimated at 500 million.

Federer, for the first time, entered the French Open with a chance to become only the sixth man to win the Career Grand Slam. He flew through the first five rounds without the loss of a set to reach his first semifinal in Paris. There he met Rafael Nadal who had dominated the clay courts in 2005 with titles in Costa do Sauípe, Acapulco, Monte-Carlo, Barcelona, and Rome. The match did not start until 6:20 pm local time. They split the first two sets with Nadal breaking in the last game of the third set to seize the two sets to one lead. Due to the late start time darkness began to fall in the fourth set and Federer requested for the match to be suspended until the next day. They played on in the near darkness, however, and Nadal broke in the eighth game of the set and served out the match. One positive Federer took from the match was that he now believed he had the game to someday win the clay Grand Slam. Additionally the crowds in Paris had taken a great liking to Federer's stylish and flamboyant style of play giving him enormous support and encouragement throughout the tournament; none more so than against Nadal, who the Parisian crowds had nicknamed "l'Ogre" for what they deemed to be his ugly and unstylish grinding manner of play.

=== Grass court season ===
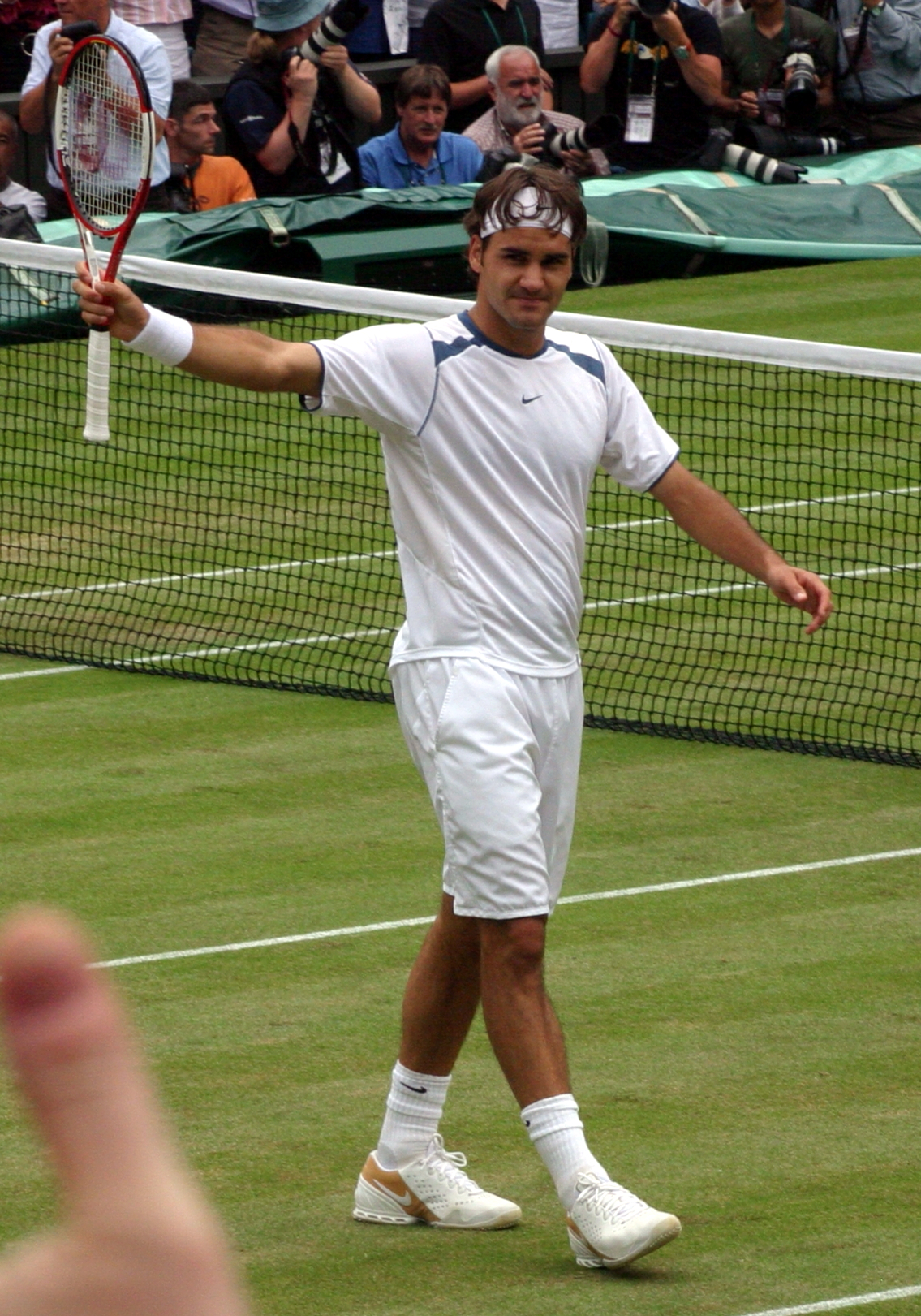
Federer at the 2005 Wimbledon Championships.

Federer began the grass swing with his usual warm-up tournament in Halle, Germany, where he was the two-time defending champion. After surviving a difficult first round against the Swede Robin Söderling, Federer swept past three Germans to reach the final. In the final he took revenge on the Australian Open champion Marat Safin, defeating the Russian 6–4, 6–7(6), 6–4.

Federer entered Wimbledon as the overwhelming favorite with a 29-match winning streak on grass which spanned back to 2003. Federer glided into the semifinals where he faced world number 2 and former Wimbledon champion Lleyton Hewitt. Although they were the top two players in the world, the special grass seedings of Wimbledon elevated Andy Roddick as the second seed over Hewitt. This created the strange and rare circumstance of the world's top 2 players meeting before a tournament final. Federer defeated Hewitt in straight sets and advanced to the final where Andy Roddick awaited a rematch of the previous year's final. For a third consecutive year Federer defeated Roddick at the All-England Club and notched his third consecutive Wimbledon crown with a clear 6–2, 7–6(2), 6–4 victory in less than 2 hours. Remarkably Federer only dropped one set during the entire championship. This marked Federer's fifth Grand Slam championship and remarkably his first of the season. He also became only the third man in the Open Era to win three consecutive Wimbledon Championships along with Björn Borg (1976–78) and Pete Sampras (1993–95 and 1997–99).

=== Summer hard court season ===
Upon doctors orders Federer was forced to skip the Canadian Open because of lingering foot issues, instead focusing on recovery for the American hard court summer.

After a six-week hiatus Federer returned to the Cincinnati Masters seeking his first title on the lightning quick courts of the American midwest. Strangely, Federer had only won a single match in his four previous appearances at the tournament. Federer was able to navigate his way to the finals where he faced a familiar foe in Andy Roddick, defeating the American in straight sets. This victory was historic as Federer became the first player in ATP history to win four masters titles in a single season. He also was able to sweep all three of the American Masters tournaments for the first time in his career, with victories in Indian Wells, Miami, and Cincinnati.

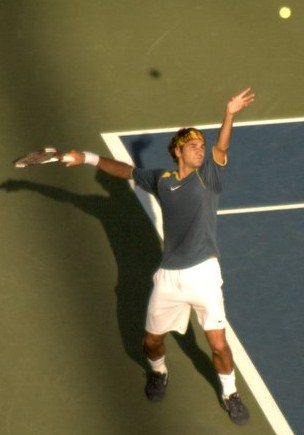
Federer at the 2005 US Open tournament.

Federer arrived in New York and once again found himself in another Grand Slam semifinal. By making the semifinals of all four Grand Slams that year he became only the fourth man to accomplish the feat in the Open Era along with Rod Laver, Ivan Lendl and his coach Tony Roche. He dismissed Hewitt once again in the semifinals, this time in four sets. In the finals he faced American legend and 8 time Grand Slam champion Andre Agassi. Federer stated prior to the final that playing Agassi in New York in the finals of the US Open would be "the highlight of my career." Celebrities such as Robin Williams, Dustin Hoffman, Lance Armstrong and Donald Trump flocked to Arthur Ashe Stadium to witness a historic generation clash of tennis superstars. The final was played on the fourth anniversary of 9/11 and patriotic fervor was in the air; it would be one of the last matches in Federer's career where the New York crowd would be pulling for his opponent. They split the first two sets, and Agassi led 4–2 in the third set before Federer leveled and the match went to a pivotal third-set tiebreaker. Federer elevated his game and won the final six points of the set to capture the tiebreaker 7–1. Federer then rolled through the fourth set to capture his second championship at the US Open. Agassi praised Federer after match, saying "Pete (Sampras) was great, no question, but there was a place to get to with Pete. It could be on your terms. There's no such place with Roger. I think he's the best I've played against." With his 6th Grand Slam championship, Federer equaled his childhood idols Stefan Edberg and Boris Becker. He became only the third man to win both Wimbledon and the US Open for two consecutive years, along with Bill Tilden (1920–21) and Don Budge (1937–38). He also became the first man in 72 years to win his first six Grand Slam finals. Federer appeared on the Late Show with David Letterman who asked him the question many were beginning to wonder: was Sampras' all-time record of 14 Grand Slams, set only three years before, starting to look approachable?

=== Fall indoor season ===
Federer immediately flew back to Geneva in order to play the Davis Cup playoffs and keep Switzerland in the World Group. Switzerland easily crushed Great Britain to remain in the World Group for the twelfth consecutive year.

Federer then traveled to Bangkok for the Thailand Open, where he was the defending champion. In the finals he defeated Scottish teenager and future rival Andy Murray in straight sets. Federer extended his incredible record of 24 consecutive victories in tournament finals, a streak dating back to October 2003. This victory clinched the year-end No. 1 ranking which made him only the fifth man to spend every week of a calendar season as the world No. 1.

While training in Switzerland in preparation for his home tournament the Swiss Indoors Basel among others, Federer once again suffered a significant injury which hampered his fall season. During a training session he severely injured his ankle, falling to the ground and needing to be helped off the court. He was diagnosed with torn ligaments in his ankle, which forced him to withdraw from Madrid, Basel, and Paris. This injury would prove to be the most significant injury of his young career, and his status for the remainder of the year was doubtful.

Federer was in a cast and crutches for several weeks and underwent an ultrasound and lymph drainage in order to be fit to compete for the Year-End Championships, where he was the two-time defending champion. Federer traveled to Shanghai but was unsure if he would be able to play even two days before the start of the tournament. The tournament appeared to be in shambles as many of the top eight including Marat Safin, Andy Roddick, Rafael Nadal, and Andre Agassi had already withdrawn with various injuries, and Lleyton Hewitt chose not to compete in order to spend time with his wife and his newborn child. A hobbled Federer struggled throughout all three of his round robin matches but was able to make the semifinals. In the semifinals he faced Gastón Gaudio, the 2004 French Open champion, and delivered an inexplicable demolition of the Argentine 6–0, 6–0. In the final he faced long-time nemesis David Nalbandian who prevailed in a fifth-set tiebreaker to deny Federer his third consecutive Masters Cup. This loss ended his 35-match winning streak that stretched back to the French Open and his record 24 consecutive finals won. Had he won the match, Federer would have tied John McEnroe's 1984 record for the highest yearly winning percentage in the open era (82–3). This greatest outcome of this tournament was that Federer's style of play had changed, probably due to his ankle injury, it was less aggressive but a more calculated and strategic playing style that one could argue whilst not as dominant as 2005 resulted in a more consistent approach to winning over the next few years. The 2005 season could therefore be deemed "Peak Federer".

=== Matches ===
==== Grand Slam performance ====
Tournament	Round	Result	Opponent	Score
Australian Open	1R	Win	(France) Fabrice Santoro	6–1, 6–1, 6–2
Australian Open	2R	Win	(Japan) Takao Suzuki	6–3, 6–4, 6–4
Australian Open	3R	Win	(Finland) Jarkko Nieminen	6–3, 5–2 retired
Australian Open	4R	Win	(Cyprus) Marcos Baghdatis	6–2, 6–2, 7–5(4)
Australian Open	QF	Win	(United States) Andre Agassi	6–3, 6–4, 6–4
Australian Open	SF	Loss	(Russia) Marat Safin	7–5, 4–6, 7–5, 6–7(6), 7–9
French Open	1R	Win	(Israel) Dudi Sela	6–1, 6–4, 6–0
French Open	2R	Win	(Spain) Nicolás Almagro	6–3, 7–6(0), 6–2
French Open	3R	Win	(Chile) Fernando González	7–6(9), 7–5, 6–2
French Open	4R	Win	(Spain) Carlos Moyá	6–1, 6–4, 6–3
French Open	QF	Win	(Romania) Victor Hănescu	6–2, 7–6(3), 6–3
French Open	SF	Loss	(Spain) Rafael Nadal	3–6, 6–4, 4–6, 3–6
Wimbledon	1R	Win	(France) Paul-Henri Mathieu	6–4, 6–2, 6–4
Wimbledon	2R	Win	(Czech Republic) Ivo Minář	6–4, 6–4, 6–1
Wimbledon	3R	Win	(Germany) Nicolas Kiefer	6–2, 6–7(5), 6–1, 7–5
Wimbledon	4R	Win	(Spain) Juan Carlos Ferrero	6–3, 6–4, 7–6(6)
Wimbledon	QF	Win	(Chile) Fernando González	7–5, 6–2, 7–6(2)
Wimbledon	SF	Win	(Australia) Lleyton Hewitt	6–3, 6–4, 7–6(4)
Wimbledon	F	Win (5)	(United States) Andy Roddick	6–2, 7–6(2), 6–4
US Open	1R	Win	(Czech Republic) Ivo Minář	6–1, 6–1, 6–1
US Open	2R	Win	(France) Fabrice Santoro	7–5, 7–5, 7–6(2)
US Open	3R	Win	(Belgium) Olivier Rochus	6–3, 7–6(8), 6–2
US Open	4R	Win	(Germany) Nicolas Kiefer	6–4, 6–7(3), 6–3, 6–4
US Open	QF	Win	(Argentina) David Nalbandian	6–2, 6–4, 6–1
US Open	SF	Win	(Australia) Lleyton Hewitt	6–3, 7–6(0), 4–6, 6–3
US Open	F	Win (6)	(United States) Andre Agassi	6–3, 2–6, 7–6(1), 6–1

==== All matches ====
===== Singles =====
Match	Tournament	Start; Date	Type	I/O	Surface	Round	Opponent	Result	Score
427	(Qatar) Doha	1/3	250	Outdoor	Hard	R32	(Spain) David Ferrer	W	6–1, 6–1
428	(Qatar) Doha	1/3	250	Outdoor	Hard	R16	(United Kingdom) Greg Rusedski	W	6–3, 6–4
429	(Qatar) Doha	1/3	250	Outdoor	Hard	Q	(Spain) Feliciano López	W	6–1, 6–2
430	(Qatar) Doha	1/3	250	Outdoor	Hard	S	(Russia) Nikolay Davydenko	W	6–3, 6–4
431	(Qatar) Doha	1/3	250	Outdoor	Hard	Win (1)	(Croatia) Ivan Ljubičić	W	6–3, 6–1
432	(Australia) Australian Open	1/17	GS	Outdoor	Hard	R128	(France) Fabrice Santoro	W	6–1, 6–1, 6–2
433	(Australia) Australian Open	1/17	GS	Outdoor	Hard	R64	(Japan) Takao Suzuki	W	6–3, 6–4, 6–4
434	(Australia) Australian Open	1/17	GS	Outdoor	Hard	R32	(Finland) Jarkko Nieminen	W	6–3, 5–2 RET
435	(Australia) Australian Open	1/17	GS	Outdoor	Hard	R16	(Cyprus) Marcos Baghdatis	W	6–2, 6–2, 7–6(4)
436	(Australia) Australian Open	1/17	GS	Outdoor	Hard	Q	(United States) Andre Agassi	W	6–3, 6–4, 6–4
437	(Australia) Australian Open	1/17	GS	Outdoor	Hard	S	(Russia) Marat Safin	L	7–5, 4–6, 7–5, 6–7(6), 7–9
438	(Netherlands) Rotterdam	2/14	500	Indoor	Hard	R32	(Czech Republic) Bohdan Ulihrach	W	6–3, 6–4
439	(Netherlands) Rotterdam	2/14	500	Indoor	Hard	R16	(Switzerland) Stanislas Wawrinka	W	6–1, 6–4
440	(Netherlands) Rotterdam	2/14	500	Indoor	Hard	Q	(Russia) Nikolay Davydenko (2)	W	7–5, 7–5
441	(Netherlands) Rotterdam	2/14	500	Indoor	Hard	S	(Croatia) Mario Ančić	W	7–5, 6–3
442	(Netherlands) Rotterdam	2/14	500	Indoor	Hard	Win (2)	(Croatia) Ivan Ljubičić (2)	W	5–7, 7–5, 7–6(5)
443	(United Arab Emirates) Dubai	2/21	500	Outdoor	Hard	R32	(Czech Republic) Ivo Minář	W	6–7(5), 6–3, 7–6(5)
444	(United Arab Emirates) Dubai	2/21	500	Outdoor	Hard	R16	(Spain) Juan Carlos Ferrero	W	4–6, 6–3, 7–6(6)
445	(United Arab Emirates) Dubai	2/21	500	Outdoor	Hard	Q	(Russia) Mikhail Youzhny	W	6–3, 7–5
446	(United Arab Emirates) Dubai	2/21	500	Outdoor	Hard	S	(United States) Andre Agassi (2)	W	6–3, 6–1
447	(United Arab Emirates) Dubai	2/21	500	Outdoor	Hard	Win (3)	(Croatia) Ivan Ljubičić (3)	W	6–1, 6–7(6), 6–3
-	(United States) Indian Wells Masters	3/7	1000	Outdoor	Hard	R128	Bye	-	
448	(United States) Indian Wells Masters	3/7	1000	Outdoor	Hard	R64	(United States) Mardy Fish	W	6–3, 6–3
449	(United States) Indian Wells Masters	3/7	1000	Outdoor	Hard	R32	(Luxembourg) Gilles Müller	W	6–3, 6–2
450	(United States) Indian Wells Masters	3/7	1000	Outdoor	Hard	R16	(Croatia) Ivan Ljubičić (4)	W	7–6(3), 7–6(4)
451	(United States) Indian Wells Masters	3/7	1000	Outdoor	Hard	Q	(Germany) Nicolas Kiefer	W	6–4, 6–1
452	(United States) Indian Wells Masters	3/7	1000	Outdoor	Hard	S	(Argentina) Guillermo Cañas	W	6–3, 6–1
453	(United States) Indian Wells Masters	3/7	1000	Outdoor	Hard	Win (4)	(Australia) Lleyton Hewitt	W	6–2, 6–4, 6–4
-	(United States) Miami Masters	3/21	1000	Outdoor	Hard	R128	Bye	-	
454	(United States) Miami Masters	3/21	1000	Outdoor	Hard	R64	(Belgium) Olivier Rochus	W	6–3, 6–1
455	(United States) Miami Masters	3/21	1000	Outdoor	Hard	R32	(Argentina) Mariano Zabaleta	W	6–2, 5–7, 6–3
456	(United States) Miami Masters	3/21	1000	Outdoor	Hard	R16	(Croatia) Mario Ančić (2)	W	6–3, 4–6, 6–4
457	(United States) Miami Masters	3/21	1000	Outdoor	Hard	Q	(United Kingdom) Tim Henman	W	6–4, 6–2
458	(United States) Miami Masters	3/21	1000	Outdoor	Hard	S	(United States) Andre Agassi (3)	W	6–4, 6–3
459	(United States) Miami Masters	3/21	1000	Outdoor	Hard	Win (5)	(Spain) Rafael Nadal	W	2–6, 6–7(4), 7–6(5), 6–3, 6–1
460	(Monaco) Monte Carlo Masters	4/11	1000	Outdoor	Clay	R64	(United Kingdom) Greg Rusedski (2)	W	6–3, 6–1
461	(Monaco) Monte Carlo Masters	4/11	1000	Outdoor	Clay	R32	(Spain) Albert Montañés	W	6–3, 6–4
462	(Monaco) Monte Carlo Masters	4/11	1000	Outdoor	Clay	R16	(Chile) Fernando González	W	6–2, 6–7(3), 6–4
463	(Monaco) Monte Carlo Masters	4/11	1000	Outdoor	Clay	Q	(France) Richard Gasquet	L	7–6(1), 2–6, 6–7(8)
464	(Germany) Hamburg Masters	5/9	1000	Outdoor	Clay	R64	(Spain) Fernando Verdasco	W	6–4, 6–3
465	(Germany) Hamburg Masters	5/9	1000	Outdoor	Clay	R32	(Czech Republic) Tomáš Berdych	W	6–2, 6–1
466	(Germany) Hamburg Masters	5/9	1000	Outdoor	Clay	R16	(Spain) Tommy Robredo	W	6–2, 6–3
467	(Germany) Hamburg Masters	5/9	1000	Outdoor	Clay	Q	(Argentina) Guillermo Coria	W	6–4, 7–6(3)
468	(Germany) Hamburg Masters	5/9	1000	Outdoor	Clay	S	(Russia) Nikolay Davydenko (3)	W	6–3, 6–4
469	(Germany) Hamburg Masters	5/9	1000	Outdoor	Clay	Win (6)	(France) Richard Gasquet (2)	W	6–3, 7–5, 7–6(4)
470	(France) Roland Garros	5/23	GS	Outdoor	Clay	R128	(Israel) Dudi Sela	W	6–1, 6–4, 6–0
471	(France) Roland Garros	5/23	GS	Outdoor	Clay	R64	(Spain) Nicolás Almagro	W	6–3, 7–6, 6–2
472	(France) Roland Garros	5/23	GS	Outdoor	Clay	R32	(Chile) Fernando González (2)	W	7–6(9), 7–5, 6–2
473	(France) Roland Garros	5/23	GS	Outdoor	Clay	R16	(Spain) Carlos Moyá	W	6–1, 6–4, 6–3
474	(France) Roland Garros	5/23	GS	Outdoor	Clay	Q	(Romania) Victor Hănescu	W	6–2, 7–6(3), 6–3
475	(France) Roland Garros	5/23	GS	Outdoor	Clay	S	(Spain) Rafael Nadal (2)	L	3–6, 6–4, 4–6, 3–6
476	(Germany) Halle	6/6	250	Outdoor	Grass	R32	(Sweden) Robin Söderling	W	6–7(5), 7–6(6), 6–4
477	(Germany) Halle	6/6	250	Outdoor	Grass	R16	(Germany) Florian Mayer	W	6–2, 6–4
478	(Germany) Halle	6/6	250	Outdoor	Grass	Q	(Germany) Philipp Kohlschreiber	W	6–3, 6–4
479	(Germany) Halle	6/6	250	Outdoor	Grass	S	(Germany) Tommy Haas	W	6–4, 7–6(9)
480	(Germany) Halle	6/6	250	Outdoor	Grass	Win (7)	(Russia) Marat Safin (2)	W	6–4, 6–7(6), 6–4
481	(United Kingdom) Wimbledon	6/20	GS	Outdoor	Grass	R128	(France) Paul-Henri Mathieu	W	6–4, 6–2, 6–4
482	(United Kingdom) Wimbledon	6/20	GS	Outdoor	Grass	R64	(Czech Republic) Ivo Minář (2)	W	6–4, 6–4, 6–1
483	(United Kingdom) Wimbledon	6/20	GS	Outdoor	Grass	R32	(Germany) Nicolas Kiefer (2)	W	6–2, 6–7(5), 6–1, 7–5
484	(United Kingdom) Wimbledon	6/20	GS	Outdoor	Grass	R16	(Spain) Juan Carlos Ferrero (2)	W	6–3, 6–4, 7–6(6)
485	(United Kingdom) Wimbledon	6/20	GS	Outdoor	Grass	Q	(Chile) Fernando González (3)	W	7–5, 6–2, 7–6(2)
486	(United Kingdom) Wimbledon	6/20	GS	Outdoor	Grass	S	(Australia) Lleyton Hewitt (2)	W	6–3, 6–4, 7–6(4)
487	(United Kingdom) Wimbledon	6/20	GS	Outdoor	Grass	Win (8)	(United States) Andy Roddick	W	6–2, 7–6(2), 6–4
488	(United States) Cincinnati Masters	8/15	1000	Outdoor	Hard	R64	(United States) James Blake	W	7–6(3), 7–5
489	(United States) Cincinnati Masters	8/15	1000	Outdoor	Hard	R32	(Germany) Nicolas Kiefer (3)	W	4–6, 6–4, 6–4
490	(United States) Cincinnati Masters	8/15	1000	Outdoor	Hard	R16	(Belgium) Olivier Rochus (2)	W	6–3, 6–4
491	(United States) Cincinnati Masters	8/15	1000	Outdoor	Hard	Q	(Argentina) José Acasuso	W	6–4, 6–3
492	(United States) Cincinnati Masters	8/15	1000	Outdoor	Hard	S	(United States) Robby Ginepri	W	4–6, 7–5, 6–4
493	(United States) Cincinnati Masters	8/15	1000	Outdoor	Hard	Win (9)	(United States) Andy Roddick (2)	W	6–3, 7–5
494	(United States) US Open	8/29	GS	Outdoor	Hard	R128	(Czech Republic) Ivo Minář (3)	W	6–1, 6–1, 6–1
495	(United States) US Open	8/29	GS	Outdoor	Hard	R64	(France) Fabrice Santoro (2)	W	7–5, 7–5, 7–6(2)
496	(United States) US Open	8/29	GS	Outdoor	Hard	R32	(Belgium) Olivier Rochus (3)	W	6–3, 7–6(6), 6–2
497	(United States) US Open	8/29	GS	Outdoor	Hard	R16	(Germany) Nicolas Kiefer (4)	W	6–4, 6–7(3), 6–3, 6–4
498	(United States) US Open	8/29	GS	Outdoor	Hard	Q	(Argentina) David Nalbandian	W	6–2, 6–4, 6–1
499	(United States) US Open	8/29	GS	Outdoor	Hard	S	(Australia) Lleyton Hewitt (3)	W	6–3, 7–6, 4–6, 6–3
500	(United States) US Open	8/29	GS	Outdoor	Hard	Win (10)	(United States) Andre Agassi (4)	W	6–3, 2–6, 7–6(1), 6–1
501	SUI v. GBR WG Play-offs	9/23	DC	Indoor	Clay	RR	(United Kingdom) Alan Mackin	W	6–0, 6–0, 6–2
502	(Thailand) Bangkok	9/26	250	Indoor	Hard	R32	(Brazil) Marcos Daniel	W	7–6(4), 6–4
503	(Thailand) Bangkok	9/26	250	Indoor	Hard	R16	(Germany) Denis Gremelmayr	W	6–3, 6–2
504	(Thailand) Bangkok	9/26	250	Indoor	Hard	Q	(Luxembourg) Gilles Müller (2)	W	6–4, 6–3
505	(Thailand) Bangkok	9/26	250	Indoor	Hard	S	(Finland) Jarkko Nieminen (2)	W	6–3, 6–4
506	(Thailand) Bangkok	9/26	250	Indoor	Hard	Win (11)	(United Kingdom) Andy Murray	W	6–3, 7–5
507	(China) Tennis Masters Cup	11/14	WC	Indoor	Carpet	RR	(Argentina) David Nalbandian (2)	W	6–3, 2–6, 6–4
508	(China) Tennis Masters Cup	11/14	WC	Indoor	Carpet	RR	(Croatia) Ivan Ljubičić (5)	W	6–3, 2–6, 7–6(4)
509	(China) Tennis Masters Cup	11/14	WC	Indoor	Carpet	RR	(Argentina) Guillermo Coria (2)	W	6–0, 1–6, 6–2
510	(China) Tennis Masters Cup	11/14	WC	Indoor	Carpet	S	(Argentina) Gastón Gaudio	W	6–0, 6–0
511	(China) Tennis Masters Cup	11/14	WC	Indoor	Carpet	F	(Argentina) David Nalbandian (3)	L	7–6(4), 7–6(11), 2–6, 1–6, 6–7(3)

=== Singles schedule ===
Date	Championship	Location	Category	Surface	2004 Result	2004 Points	New Points	Outcome
3 January 2005– 8 January 2005	Qatar Open	Doha (QAT)	ATP International Series	Hard	A	0	250	Winner (defeated Ivan Ljubičić, 6–3, 6–1)
17 January 2005– 30 January 2005	Australian Open	Melbourne (AUS)	Grand Slam	Hard	W	1000	450	Semifinals (lost to Marat Safin, 7–5, 4–6, 7–5, 6–7^{(6–8)}, 7–9)
14 February 2005– 20 February 2005	Rotterdam Open	Rotterdam (NED)	ATP International Series Gold	Hard (i)	QF	60	250	Winner (defeated Ivan Ljubičić, 5–7, 7–5, 7–6^{(7–5)})
21 February 2005– 27 February 2005	Dubai Tennis Championships	Dubai (UAE)	ATP International Series Gold	Hard	W	300	300	Winner (defeated Ivan Ljubičić, 6–1, 6–7^{(6–8)}, 6–3)
7 March 2005– 20 March 2005	Indian Wells Masters	Indian Wells (USA)	ATP Masters Series	Hard	W	500	500	Winner (defeated Lleyton Hewitt, 6–2, 6–4, 6–4)
21 March 2005– 3 April 2005	Miami Open	Miami (USA)	ATP Masters Series	Hard	R32	35	500	Winner (defeated Rafael Nadal, 2–6, 6–7^{(4–7)}, 7–6^{(7–5)}, 6–3, 6–1)
11 April 2005– 17 April 2005	Monte Carlo Masters	Monte Carlo (MON)	ATP Masters Series	Clay	A	0	125	Quarterfinals (lost to Richard Gasquet, 7–6^{(7–1)}, 2–6, 6–7^{(8–10)})
9 May 2005– 15 May 2005	German Open	Hamburg (GER)	ATP Masters Series	Clay	W	500	500	Winner (defeated Richard Gasquet, 6–3, 7–5, 7–6^{(7–4)})
23 May 2005– 5 June 2005	French Open	Paris (FRA)	Grand Slam	Clay	R32	75	450	Semifinals (lost to Rafael Nadal, 3–6, 6–4, 4–6, 3–6)
6 June 2005– 12 June 2005	Halle Open	Halle (GER)	ATP International Series	Grass	W	225	225	Winner (defeated Marat Safin, 6–4, 6–7^{(6–8)}, 6–4)
20 June 2005– 3 July 2005	The Championships, Wimbledon	Wimbledon (GBR)	Grand Slam	Grass	W	1000	1000	Winner (defeated Andy Roddick, 6–2, 7–6^{(7–2)}, 6–4)
15 August 2005– 21 August 2005	Cincinnati Masters	Cincinnati (USA)	ATP Masters Series	Hard	R64	5	500	Winner (defeated Andy Roddick, 6–3, 7–5)
29 August 2005– 11 September 2005	US Open	New York (USA)	Grand Slam	Hard	W	1000	1000	Winner (defeated Andre Agassi, 6–3, 2–6, 7–6^{(7–1)}, 6–1)
23 September 2005– 25 September 2005	Davis Cup WG Play-offs: Switzerland vs. Great Britain	Geneva (SUI)	Davis Cup	Clay (i)				Switzerland def. United Kingdom 5–0, advances to 2006 World Group
26 September 2005– 2 October 2005	Thailand Open	Bangkok (THA)	ATP International Series	Hard (i)	W	175	175	Winner (defeated Andy Murray, 6–3, 7–5)
14 November 2005– 20 November 2005	Tennis Masters Cup	Shanghai (CHN)	Tennis Masters Cup	Carpet (i)	W	750	500	Final (lost to David Nalbandian, 7–6^{(7–4)}, 7–6^{(13–11)}, 2–6, 1–6, 6–7^{(3–7)})
Total year-end points						6,335	6,725	▲390 difference

== Yearly records ==
=== Finals ===
==== Singles: 12 (11–1) ====
Legend Grand Slam (2–0) ATP World Tour Finals (0–1) ATP World Tour Masters 1000 (4–0) ATP World Tour 500 Series (2–0) ATP World Tour 250 Series (3–0)	Titles by surface Hard (8–0) Clay (1–0) Grass (2–0) Carpet (0–1)	Titles by surface Outdoors (9–0) Indoors (2–1)

Outcome	No.	Date	Tournament	Surface	Opponent	Score
Winner	23.	9 January 2005	Qatar Open, Qatar	Hard	(Croatia) Ivan Ljubičić	6–3, 6–1
Winner	24.	20 February 2005	Rotterdam Open, Netherlands	Hard (i)	(Croatia) Ivan Ljubičić	5–7, 7–5, 7–6^{(7–5)}
Winner	25.	27 February 2005	Dubai Tennis Championships, United Arab Emirates (3)	Hard	(Croatia) Ivan Ljubičić	6–1, 6–7^{(6–8)}, 6–3
Winner	26.	20 March 2005	Indian Wells Masters, United States (2)	Hard	(Australia) Lleyton Hewitt	6–2, 6–4, 6–4
Winner	27.	3 April 2005	Miami Masters, United States	Hard	(Spain) Rafael Nadal	2–6, 6–7^{(4–7)}, 7–6^{(7–5)}, 6–3, 6–1
Winner	28.	15 May 2005	Hamburg Masters, Germany (3)	Clay	(France) Richard Gasquet	6–3, 7–5, 7–6^{(7–4)}
Winner	29.	13 June 2005	Halle Open, Germany (3)	Grass	(Russia) Marat Safin	6–4, 6–7^{(6–8)}, 6–4
Winner	30.	3 July 2005	Wimbledon, England, UK (3)	Grass	(United States) Andy Roddick	6–2, 7–6^{(7–2)}, 6–4
Winner	31.	21 August 2005	Cincinnati Masters, United States	Hard	(United States) Andy Roddick	6–3, 7–5
Winner	32.	11 September 2005	US Open, United States (2)	Hard	(United States) Andre Agassi	6–3, 2–6, 7–6^{(7–1)}, 6–1
Winner	33.	2 October 2005	Thailand Open, Thailand (2)	Hard (i)	(United Kingdom) Andy Murray	6–3, 7–5
Runner-up	9.	20 November 2005	Year-End Championships, China	Carpet (i)	(Argentina) David Nalbandian	7–6^{(7–4)}, 7–6^{(13–11)}, 2–6, 1–6, 6–7^{(3–7)}

== See also ==
- Roger Federer
- Roger Federer career statistics
