= 2005 Gerry Weber Open =

- Date: 6–12 June
- Edition: 13th
- Category: International Series
- Draw: 32S / 16D
- Prize money: $775,000
- Surface: Grass / outdoor
- Location: Halle, Germany
- Venue: Gerry Weber Stadion

Champions

Singles
- (Switzerland) Roger Federer

Doubles
- (Switzerland) Yves Allegro / (Switzerland) Roger Federer
- Gerry Weber Open

The 2005 Gerry Weber Open was a men's tennis tournament played on outdoor grass courts. It was the 13th edition of the Gerry Weber Open, and was part of the International Series of the 2005 ATP Tour. It took place at the Gerry Weber Stadion in Halle, North Rhine-Westphalia, Germany, from 6 June through 12 June 2005. First-seeded Roger Federer won his third consecutive singles title at the event.

== Finals ==
=== Singles ===
(Switzerland) Roger Federer defeated (Russia) Marat Safin, 6–4, 6–7^{(6–8)}, 6–4

- It was Federer's 7th title of the year, and the 29th of his career. It was his 3rd consecutive win at the event.

=== Doubles ===
(Switzerland) Yves Allegro / (Switzerland) Roger Federer defeated (Sweden) Joachim Johansson / (Russia) Marat Safin, 7–5, 6–7^{(6–8)}, 6–3

- It was Allegro's 2nd title of the year and the 3rd of his career. It was Federer's 8th title of the year and the 30th of his career.
