= 2007 Indianapolis Tennis Championships – Doubles =

Doubles
- 2007 Indianapolis Tennis Championships

Final
- Champions: (Argentina) Juan Martín del Potro (United States) Travis Parrott
- Runners-up: (Russia) Teymuraz Gabashvili (Croatia) Ivo Karlović
- Score: 3–6, 6–2, [10–6]

Events
Singles	Doubles
- Indianapolis Tennis Championships

Bobby Reynolds and Andy Roddick were the defending champions, but Reynolds did not participate this year. Roddick partnered Mardy Fish and made it to the quarterfinals before withdrawing from the event.

Juan Martín del Potro and Travis Parrott won the title, defeating Teymuraz Gabashvili and Ivo Karlović 3–6, 6–2, [10–6] in the final. This was Del Potro's first-ever ATP title, and as of 2019 his only doubles title.

== Seeds ==
1. (India) Mahesh Bhupathi / (Australia) Paul Hanley (first round)
2. (United States) Eric Butorac / (United Kingdom) Jamie Murray (quarterfinals)
3. (South Africa) Jeff Coetzee / (Australia) Todd Perry (first round)
4. (Australia) Jordan Kerr / (United States) Jim Thomas (first round)

== Draw ==
Key

- Q = Qualifier
- WC = Wild card
- LL = Lucky loser
- Alt = Alternate
- ITF = ITF entry
- PR = Protected ranking
- SR = Special ranking
- SE = Special exempt
- JE = Junior exempt
- JR = Junior Accelerator Programme entrant
- CO = College Accelerator Programme entrant
- NG = Next Gen Accelerator Program entrant
- w/o = Walkover
- r = Retired
- d = Defaulted

=== Draw ===
First round
1	(India) M Bhupathi (Australia) P Hanley	7^{7}	4	[8]
(United States) M Fish (United States) A Roddick	6^{2}	6	[10]
(United States) A Delić (United States) J Gimelstob	6	2	[10]
(Australia) S Huss (United States) V Spadea	2	6	[1]
3	(South Africa) J Coetzee (Australia) T Perry	6	6^{6}	[9]
(Russia) T Gabashvili (Croatia) I Karlović	4	7^{8}	[11]
Alt	(Germany) B Becker (Germany) M Berrer	6	7^{8}
(United States) P Goldstein (United States) R Ram	4	6^{6}
Alt	(Argentina) JM del Potro (United States) T Parrott	w/o
(Sweden) T Johansson (Germany) N Kiefer
(Brazil) M Melo (Brazil) A Sá	6	7^{7}
4	(Australia) J Kerr (United States) J Thomas	4	6^{2}
(United Kingdom) J Auckland (United States) T Phillips	6	3	[8]
WC	(United States) S Lipsky (United States) D Martin	4	6	[10]
(Russia) I Kunitsyn (South Korea) H-t Lee	3	4
2	(United States) E Butorac (United Kingdom) J Murray	6	6

Quarterfinals
(United States) M Fish (United States) A Roddick
(United States) A Delić (United States) J Gimelstob	w/o
(Russia) T Gabashvili (Croatia) I Karlović	7^{7}	7^{7}
Alt	(Germany) B Becker (Germany) M Berrer	6^{2}	6^{4}
Alt	(Argentina) JM del Potro (United States) T Parrott	6^{5}	7^{7}	[10]
(Brazil) M Melo (Brazil) A Sá	7^{7}	6^{5}	[6]
WC	(United States) S Lipsky (United States) D Martin	6	3	[10]
2	(United States) E Butorac (United Kingdom) J Murray	3	6	[6]

Semifinals
(United States) A Delić (United States) J Gimelstob	3	4
(Russia) T Gabashvili (Croatia) I Karlović	6	6
Alt	(Argentina) JM del Potro (United States) T Parrott	6	6
WC	(United States) S Lipsky (United States) D Martin	3	3

Final
(Russia) T Gabashvili (Croatia) I Karlović	6	2	[6]
Alt	(Argentina) JM del Potro (United States) T Parrott	3	6	[10]
