= 2006 RCA Championships =

- Date: July 17–24
- Edition: 19th
- Category: International Series
- Draw: 48S / 16D
- Prize money: $575,000
- Surface: Hard / outdoor
- Location: Indianapolis, Indiana, U.S.
- Venue: Indianapolis Tennis Center

Champions

Singles
- (United States) James Blake

Doubles
- (United States) Bobby Reynolds / (United States) Andy Roddick
- Indianapolis Tennis Championships

The 2006 RCA Championships was a tennis tournament played on outdoor hard courts. It was the 19th edition of the event known that year as the RCA Championships, and was part of the International Series of the 2006 ATP Tour. It took place at the Indianapolis Tennis Center in Indianapolis, Indiana, United States, from July 17 through July 24, 2006. It was the first event of the 2004 US Open series.

The singles draw featured Americans James Blake (seeded #3), Andy Roddick (2003 U.S. Open champion – #2) and Robby Ginepri (#4) as three of the top four seeds. It also featured Delray Beach and Los Angeles winner Tommy Haas, Fernando González, Dmitry Tursunov and former grand slam finalist Marat Safin.

== Finals ==
=== Singles ===
(United States) James Blake defeated (United States) Andy Roddick, 4–6, 6–4, 7–6^{(7–5)}

- It was James Blake's 3rd title of the year, and his 6th overall.

=== Doubles ===
(United States) Bobby Reynolds / (United States) Andy Roddick defeated (United States) Paul Goldstein / (United States) Jim Thomas, 6–4, 6–4
