= 2007 Indianapolis Tennis Championships – Singles =

Singles
- 2007 Indianapolis Tennis Championships

Final
- Champion: (Russia) Dmitry Tursunov
- Runner-up: (Canada) Frank Dancevic
- Score: 6–4, 7–5

Details
- Draw: 32 (4Q / 3WC)
- Seeds: 8

Events
Singles	Doubles
← 2006 ·	Indianapolis Tennis Championships	· 2008 →

James Blake was the defending champion, but lost in the quarterfinals to Sam Querrey.

Third-seeded Dmitry Tursunov won in the final 6–4, 7–5, against Frank Dancevic.

== Seeds ==
1. (United States) Andy Roddick (semifinals)
2. (United States) James Blake (quarterfinals)
3. (Russia) Dmitry Tursunov (champion)
4. (United States) Mardy Fish (second round, retired due to a left knee injury)
5. (Croatia) Ivo Karlović (second round)
6. (South Korea) Hyung-taik Lee (quarterfinals)
7. (United States) Robby Ginepri (first round)
8. (Germany) Benjamin Becker (first round)

== Draw ==
=== Key ===
- Q = Qualifier
- WC = Wild card
- LL = Lucky loser
- Alt = Alternate
- SE = Special exempt
- PR = Protected ranking
- ITF = ITF entry
- JE = Junior exempt
- w/o = Walkover
- r = Retired
- d = Defaulted
- SR = Special ranking

=== Finals ===
Semifinals
1	(United States) Andy Roddick	4	6^{1}
(Canada) Frank Dancevic	6	7^{7}
3	(Russia) Dmitry Tursunov	7^{7}	6
(United States) Sam Querrey	6^{5}	2

Final
(Canada) Frank Dancevic	4	5
3	(Russia) Dmitry Tursunov	6	7

=== Top half ===
First round
1	(United States) A Roddick	6	6
WC	(United States) A Kuznetsov	4	0
(United States) J Gimelstob	2	4
(Russia) E Korolev	6	6
(United States) P Goldstein	6	6
(United States) R Kendrick	4	4
WC	(United States) D Young	2	4
6	(South Korea) H-t Lee	6	6
4	(United States) M Fish	2	7	7
(United States) V Spadea	6	5	5
(Russia) I Kunitsyn	6	1	7
Q	(Colombia) S Giraldo	2	6	5
(Argentina) JM del Potro	7	7^{7}
(United States) A Delić	5	6^{5}
(Canada) F Dancevic	6	6
8	(Germany) B Becker	4	3

Second round
1	(United States) A Roddick	6	6
(Russia) E Korolev	3	2
(United States) P Goldstein	3	3
6	(South Korea) H-t Lee	6	6
4	(United States) M Fish	4	r
(Russia) I Kunitsyn	6
(Argentina) JM del Potro	6	6^{5}	4
(Canada) F Dancevic	3	7^{7}	6

Quarterfinals
1	(United States) A Roddick	6	6^{7}	6
6	(South Korea) H-t Lee	3	7^{9}	1
(Russia) I Kunitsyn	4	6^{3}
(Canada) F Dancevic	6	7^{7}

Semifinals
1	(United States) A Roddick	4	6^{1}
(Canada) F Dancevic	6	7^{7}

=== Bottom half ===
First round
7	(United States) R Ginepri	6	2	1
(Germany) M Berrer	3	6	6
Q	(Colombia) A Falla	4	3
Q	(Japan) K Nishikori	6	6
(Russia) T Gabashvili	7	3	6
WC	(United States) R Ram	5	6	4
(United States) M Russell	3	5
3	(Russia) D Tursunov	6	7
5	(Croatia) I Karlović	6	6^{5}	7^{7}
LL	(Brazil) A Sá	4	7^{7}	6^{3}
(France) J Benneteau	6^{6}	1
(United States) S Querrey	7^{8}	6
Q	(Brazil) R Mello	6	6
(France) G Monfils	4	4
(Sweden) T Johansson	5	6^{9}
2	(United States) J Blake	7	7^{11}

Second round
(Germany) M Berrer	3	6	1
Q	(Japan) K Nishikori	6	3	6
(Russia) T Gabashvili	3	6	2
3	(Russia) D Tursunov	6	0	6
5	(Croatia) I Karlović	7	5	6^{6}
(United States) S Querrey	5	7	7^{8}
Q	(Brazil) R Mello	4	2
2	(United States) J Blake	6	6

Quarterfinals
Q	(Japan) K Nishikori	1	4
3	(Russia) D Tursunov	6	6
(United States) S Querrey	7^{8}	6^{4}	7^{7}
2	(United States) J Blake	6^{6}	7^{7}	6^{4}

Semifinals
3	(Russia) D Tursunov	7^{7}	6
(United States) S Querrey	6^{5}	2
