= 2006 RCA Championships – Singles =

Singles
- 2006 RCA Championships

Final
- Champion: (United States) James Blake
- Runner-up: (United States) Andy Roddick
- Score: 4–6, 6–4, 7–6^{(7–5)}

Details
- Draw: 56 (4 Q / 4 WC )
- Seeds: 16

Events
Singles	Doubles
← 2005 ·	Indianapolis Tennis Championships	· 2007 →

Robby Ginepri was the defending champion, but lost to Andy Roddick in the semifinals.

James Blake won in the final 4–6, 6–4, 7–6^{(7–5)}, against Andy Roddick.

== Seeds ==
All seeds receive a bye into the second round.

1. (United States) James Blake (champion)
2. (United States) Andy Roddick (final)
3. (Chile) Fernando González (quarterfinals)
4. (United States) Robby Ginepri (semifinals)
5. (Germany) Tommy Haas (third round)
6. (Slovakia) Dominik Hrbatý (second round)
7. (Russia) Dmitry Tursunov (third round)
8. (Thailand) Paradorn Srichaphan (quarterfinals)
9. (Belgium) Xavier Malisse (semifinals)
10. (France) Nicolas Mahut (quarterfinals)
11. (United States) Paul Goldstein (third round)
12. (Luxembourg) Gilles Müller (quarterfinals)
13. (United States) Kevin Kim (second round)
14. (United States) Vince Spadea (third round)
15. (Russia) Igor Kunitsyn (third round)
16. (Russia) Marat Safin (second round)

== Draw ==
=== Key ===
- Q = Qualifier
- WC = Wild card
- LL = Lucky loser
- Alt = Alternate
- SE = Special exempt
- PR = Protected ranking
- ITF = ITF entry
- JE = Junior exempt
- w/o = Walkover
- r = Retired
- d = Defaulted
- SR = Special ranking

=== Finals ===
Quarterfinals
1	(United States) James Blake	7^{7}	7^{7}
10	(France) Nicolas Mahut	6^{2}	6^{5}
3	(Chile) Fernando González	6^{4}	4
9/WC	(Belgium) Xavier Malisse	7^{7}	6
8	(Thailand) Paradorn Srichaphan	4	1
4	(United States) Robby Ginepri	6	6
12	(Luxembourg) Gilles Müller	2	3
2	(United States) Andy Roddick	6	6

Semifinals
1	(United States) James Blake	6	2	6
9/WC	(Belgium) Xavier Malisse	3	6	1
4	(United States) Robby Ginepri	5	3
2	(United States) Andy Roddick	7	6

Final
1	(United States) James Blake	4	6	7^{7}
2	(United States) Andy Roddick	6	4	6^{5}

=== Top half ===
==== Section 1 ====
First round
(Czech Republic) T Cakl	2	2
(Thailand) D Udomchoke	6	6
Q	(South Africa) W Whitehouse	6	7
(United States) J Gimelstob	3	5
(Brazil) T Alves	6	6
(United States) B Reynolds	4	4
(Australia) N Healey	3	0
(Switzerland) G Bastl	6	6

Second round
1	(United States) J Blake	7^{7}	6
(Thailand) D Udomchoke	6^{5}	4
Q	(South Africa) W Whitehouse	6	6
16/WC	(Russia) M Safin	1	4
10	(France) N Mahut	6	3	6
(Brazil) T Alves	4	6	3
(Switzerland) G Bastl	3	3
5/WC	(Germany) T Haas	6	6

Third round
1	(United States) J Blake	6^{5}	6	6
Q	(South Africa) W Whitehouse	7^{7}	3	4
10	(France) N Mahut	6	7
5/WC	(Germany) T Haas	4	5

Quarterfinals
1	(United States) J Blake	7^{7}	7^{7}
10	(France) N Mahut	6^{2}	6^{5}

==== Section 2 ====
First round
(Serbia) J Tipsarević	4	7^{7}	4
WC	(United States) S Querrey	6	6^{4}	6
(Monaco) J-R Lisnard	5	5
(Brazil) R Mello	7	7
(South Korea) H-t Lee	6	7^{7}
SE	(Australia) M Philippoussis	4	6^{3}
(Germany) B Becker	6	4	7
(Spain) I Navarro	2	6	5

Second round
3	(Chile) F González	6	6
WC	(United States) S Querrey	3	4
(Brazil) R Mello	3	1
14	(United States) V Spadea	6	6
9/WC	(Belgium) X Malisse	7^{7}	6
(South Korea) H-t Lee	6^{4}	1
(Germany) B Becker	3	7	1^{r}
7	(Russia) D Tursunov	6	5	2

Third round
3	(Chile) F González	6	7^{9}
14	(United States) V Spadea	4	6^{7}
9/WC	(Belgium) X Malisse	7^{7}	3	6
7	(Russia) D Tursunov	6^{4}	6	3

Quarterfinals
3	(Chile) F González	6^{4}	4
9/WC	(Belgium) X Malisse	7^{7}	6

=== Bottom half ===
==== Section 3 ====
First round
Q	(Australia) W Arthurs	6	7
Q	(Israel) H Levy	3	5
(Chinese Taipei) Y-h Lu	3	4
(Romania) R Sabău	6	6
(Germany) L Burgsmüller	6	6
(United States) Z Fleishman	2	3
(Colombia) A Falla	6	6
(France) J-C Faurel	4	2

Second round
8	(Thailand) P Srichaphan	7^{7}	6^{4}	6
Q	(Australia) W Arthurs	6^{4}	7^{7}	4
(Romania) R Sabău	2	1
11	(United States) P Goldstein	6	6
15	(Russia) I Kunitsyn	7	6
(Germany) L Burgsmüller	5	2
(Colombia) A Falla	6	5	5
4	(United States) R Ginepri	4	7	7

Third round
8	(Thailand) P Srichaphan	5	6	7^{7}
11	(United States) P Goldstein	7	3	6^{3}
15	(Russia) I Kunitsyn	2	7^{7}	1
4	(United States) R Ginepri	6	6^{2}	6

Quarterfinals
8	(Thailand) P Srichaphan	4	1
4	(United States) R Ginepri	6	6

==== Section 4 ====
First round
(Denmark) K Carlsen	7^{7}	6
Q	(Italy) A Stoppini	6^{5}	4
(Germany) T Behrend	2	0
(Chile) P Capdeville	6	6
(United States) J Morrison	6	6
(Mexico) S González	2	2
(Paraguay) R Delgado	4	6	7^{7}
(United States) A Delić	6	2	6^{5}

Second round
6	(Slovakia) D Hrbatý	3	2
(Denmark) K Carlsen	6	6
(Chile) P Capdeville	2	3
12	(Luxembourg) G Müller	6	6
13	(United States) K Kim	2	2
(United States) J Morrison	6	6
(Paraguay) R Delgado	3	2
2	(United States) A Roddick	6	6

Third round
(Denmark) K Carlsen	1	2
12	(Luxembourg) G Müller	6	6
(United States) J Morrison	6^{4}	5
2	(United States) A Roddick	7^{7}	7

Quarterfinals
12	(Luxembourg) G Müller	2	3
2	(United States) A Roddick	6	6
