= Frank Dancevic =

Canadian former professional tennis player

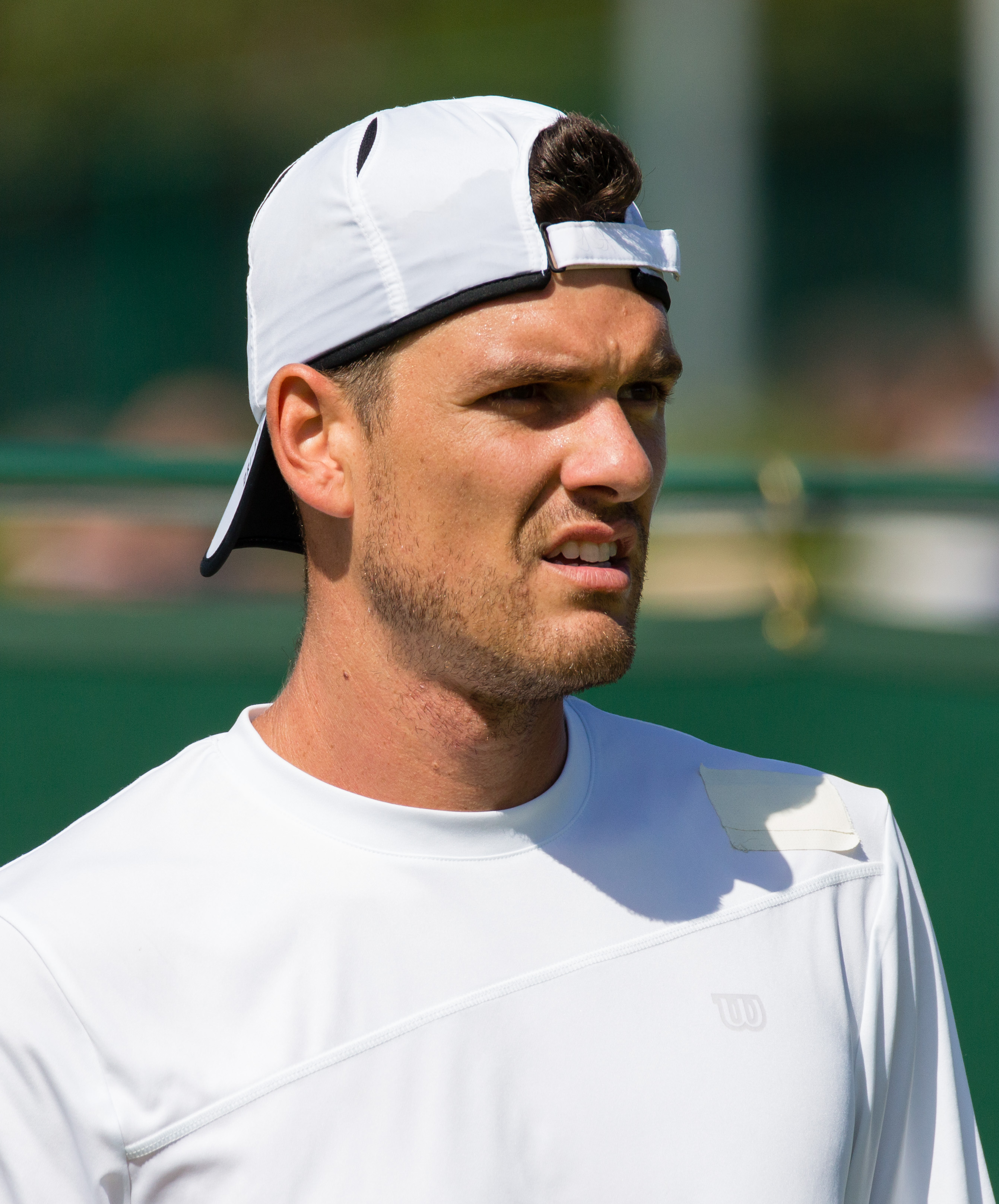
- Full name: Frank Russell Dancevic
- Country (sports): Canada
- Residence: Niagara Falls, Ontario
- Born: September 26, 1984 (age 42) Niagara Falls
- Height: 1.85 m (6 ft 1 in)
- Turned pro: 2003
- Retired: 2020
- Plays: Right-handed (one-handed backhand)
- Coach: Martin Laurendeau (–2009, 2012); Boris Vallejo (2008); Leonardo Lavalle (2008-9); John Dančević (–2014); Dejan Cvetković (2013–2019)
- Prize money: US $1,888,019

Singles
- Career record: 69–111
- Career titles: 0
- Highest ranking: No. 65 (10 September 2007)

Grand Slam singles results
- Australian Open: 2R (2007)
- French Open: 1R (2008, 2011, 2012)
- Wimbledon: 2R (2007, 2008, 2014)
- US Open: 2R (2013)

Other tournaments
- Olympic Games: 1R (2008)

Doubles
- Career record: 12–26
- Career titles: 0
- Highest ranking: No. 175 (28 January 2008)

Grand Slam doubles results
- Australian Open: 1R (2007, 2008)
- Wimbledon: Q1 (2010)

Team competitions
- Davis Cup: QF (2015)

Coaching career (2019–)
- Vasek Pospisil (2019–2021)

Frank Russell Dancevic (/ˈdæntsɪvɪk, ˈdæntʃɪvɪtʃ/ DANT-siv-ik, DAN-chiv-itch; Serbian: Френк Расел Данчевић, romanized: Frenk Rasel Dančević, pronounced [dǎːntʃevitɕ]; born September 26, 1984) is a Canadian tennis coach and a former professional player. Dancevic spent several years in the 2000s as the Canadian No. 1 in men's singles. He reached two ATP Tour singles finals, the quarterfinals of the 2007 Canadian Open, and achieved a career-high singles ranking of world No. 65 in September 2007. He has been the captain of Canada's Davis Cup team since 2017.

In August 2011, Dancevic became the first men's singles player to reach the main draw of all four majors by winning through the qualifying competition of each event.

== Personal ==
Dancevic's father is John and mother Doris. His mother is Québécoise, from Rouyn-Noranda, and his father is Serbian who originates from Apatin, Serbia. Dancevic has three younger sisters. Monika, born in 1986, completed her NCAA tennis career at the University of Georgia in 2009. She was the NCAA number 35 ranked singles player as a sophomore for the Bulldogs in 2006–07 and has been ranked by the WTA as high as World No. 775. Sonja and Kristina are twins born in 1989.

Frank is married to a Serbian model Nikolina Bojić; in September, 2013 they married in a Serbian Orthodox church in his father's hometown of Apatin.

== Tennis career ==
=== Juniors ===
As a junior, Dancevic reached as high as No. 20 in the world singles rankings in July 2001 (and No. 3 in doubles in 2002). His best grand-slam singles result came when he reached the quarterfinals of the 2001 Wimbledon Championships boys' singles. In doubles, he reached 2 junior boys' grand-slam finals with partner Giovanni Lapentti of Ecuador. They lost in the championship match at the 2001 Australian Open, but they rebounded successfully to win the 2001 Wimbledon Championships title.

=== Pro tour ===
The right-handed Dancevic turned pro in 2003 and reached his career-high singles ranking in September 2007, at world No. 65. A native of Niagara Falls, Ontario, he was at that time the highest ranked men's Canadian singles player since Daniel Nestor, who was ranked No. 61 in September 1999. It was Fred Niemeyer whom Dancevic overtook to become, in early 2006, Canada's top-ranked singles player.

Dancevic's best tournament results to date, all in singles, have been reaching the final of the 2007 Indianapolis Tennis Championships, the final of the 2009 Aegon International, the quarterfinals of the 2007 Rogers Cup, the semifinals again in Indianapolis in 2009, the semifinals of the 2008 Campbell's Hall of Fame Championships, and winning the 2003 and 2006 Granby and 2003 Lexington, 2006 Waikoloa, 2008 Surbiton Challenger, and 2012 Dallas Tennis Classic events. His best doubles result has been reaching the final of the 2007 Japan Open, partnering Stephen Huss and winning Granby in 2004 while playing with Brian Baker.

Dancevic became Canada's top ATP-ranked singles player on February 10, 2003, replacing Simon Larose. He held the position until May 19, 2003, when he was surpassed by Larose. Dancevic regained the Canada-number-one ranking on July 28, 2003, replacing Fred Niemeyer, and held it until August 11. He would not be so ranked again, however, until the following June 14, when he held the position for the week, and again for the week beginning July 12, 2004. Dancevic next was Canada's top-ranked player on August 16, 2004, and remained so this time until July 18, 2005, when he was replaced again by Niemeyer. He regained the ranking once more, nevertheless, from August 1 to October 17, 2005, only to lose it once more to Niemeyer.

Dancevic was coached by former tour player Leo Lavalle from sometime in 2008 until June 2009, when he returned to former mentor and Canadian Davis Cup captain, Martin Laurendeau. From May 2008 until hiring Lavalle, Dancevic worked with Frenchman Boris Vallejo. After being coached by his father John Dančević in 2012, Dancevic's selected Canadian former player Dejan Cvetković as his coach.

==== 2000–2002 ====
Dancevic played his professional tour event in July 2000, the Granby Challenger, and lost in the first round to the world No. 381 player, Phillip King, in three sets. He lost in the first round in the same event a year later in straight sets to the world No. 157 player, Axel Pretzsch. In February and April 2002, Dancevic played on Canada's Davis Cup team, going 1–1 in two dead rubbers. In his first Futures event, U.S. F10 in May, he won his first three matches in straight sets, reaching the semifinals. Losing in the first round of F11, he reached the finals of F12. Then in July, he reached the second round of the Granby Challenger (in his third appearance). Dancevic then lost his first full-fledged tour event match, at the Canada Masters, to Fabrice Santoro 5–7, 3–6. The following week Dancevic was entered into the Legg Mason Tennis Classic as a wildcard and proceeded to defeat world No. 90 and future world No. 3, Nikolay Davydenko, in the first round, 6–4, 6–7, 6–3. He ended the year however losing two singles matches in a Davis Cup tie with Brazil and in the first round of a Tyler, Texas Challenger. He finished 2002 ranked world No. 434 in singles and No. 414 in doubles.

==== 2003–2004 ====
Dancevic began 2003 on a roll, winning the first two tournaments he entered and reaching the semifinals of a third, all Futures played in consecutive weeks in January in Florida. Winning a Davis Cup match in a tie against Peru in April, he reached the final of Canada F1 in June, then won Canada F2 and the Granby and Lexington Challengers in July. This saw his singles ranking climb to world No. 198, allowing him to play in qualifying for the US Open, in his circuit Grand Slam debut, where he reached the second round. He finished the year however losing five of seven matches, and his first five of 2004. He lost in qualifying for the 2004 Australian Open in the second round.

In March 2004 Frank's fortunes changed as he reached the final of France F5. He reached the second round in the next two challengers, the quarters in the next, and then the semifinals in Surbiton on grass. The following week, again on grass at Queen's Club, Dancevic reached the second round in just his third full-fledged ATP event. He attempted to qualify for Wimbledon but lost in the first round. In summer play, he reached the semifinals at Granby and the finals at Aptos Challenger in July, but lost again in the first round at the Canada Masters. He followed this up though by reaching the semifinals at the Binghamton, New York Challenger and the second round in US Open qualifying. He had a better autumn playing the American Challenger Tour, posting 11 match-wins against five losses. Dancevic finished 2004 ranked world No. 171 in singles and No. 462 in doubles.

==== 2005 ====
Dancevic began 2005 playing four consecutive International Series or higher events, going two wins, four losses. He went one step better in Grand Slam play too, reaching the third round of qualifying for the Australian Open. He improved at Wimbledon too, reaching the second round in qualifying. Dancevic did not get out of the second round of the main draw in any event, however, until reaching the quarters at the Granby Challenger in June. He lost in the first round at the Canada Masters to Xavier Malisse, 2–6, 2–6, and again reached the second round in qualifying for the US Open.

Despite a disappointing year, in September Frank narrowly lost to Max Mirnyi in the deciding rubber of a Davis Cup World Group Play Off tie. In five American Challenger events in the fall, he only got past the second round once, when he reached finals of the Boston Challenger. He lost this match 7–5, 5–7, 3–6 to American Paul Goldstein. Dancevic finished 2005 ranked world No. 188 in singles and No. 403 in doubles.

==== 2006 ====
Dancevic began the year with a bang in winning the first event that he entered, the Waikoloa Challenger, reaching finals of his next event, the Besançon Challenger, and then the semifinals of the Cherbourg Challenger. After moderate success on clay in four events in Mexico played around a tie against the Mexico Davis Cup team, where he lost both of his singles matches, he reached the final of the Atlanta Challenger played on hardcourts.

In June for the second time Dancevic reached the second round at Queen's. He then qualified for his first Grand Slam main draw, at the 2006 Wimbledon Championships. He was defeated in the first round by Radek Štěpánek in straight sets, however. Dancevic's better year continued as he won the Granby Challenger in July and in August reached the second round of the Canada Masters for the first time in five attempts. His singles ranking cracked the top 100 for the first time with his title victory in Granby. The top seed for qualifying for the US Open, he failed to make the main draw, nevertheless.

In the autumn, Dancevic reached the second round in three straight ATP Tour tournaments, Bangkok, Tokyo, and Stockholm. Following a first-round loss in St. Petersburg, he reached the quarter-finals in two straight challengers, Louisville and Nashville. He retired from his final match of the year, in the first round of the Champaign Challenger. Frank finished the year ranked world No. 88 in singles and No. 479 in doubles.

==== 2007 ====
Dancevic began 2007 going 1–2 in round robin matches at the International Series event Next Generation Adelaide International. He opened the Australian Open with a straight sets win over Victor Hănescu and lost in the second round to No. 19 seed Lleyton Hewitt in four sets. He then lost in the second round of the PBZ Zagreb Indoors to Marcos Baghdatis after a straight sets win over Alexander Waske. Dancevic lost in the first round of the next three International Series events he appeared in San Jose, Memphis, and Las Vegas, losing to Andy Roddick, Andy Murray, and Igor Kunitsyn respectively. He then reached the second round at the ATP Masters Series Indian Wells, defeating Waske again and losing to Fernando González. Dancevic then dropped down to the challenger circuit, reaching the finals in Bermuda, the second round in Naples, Florida, and losing in the first round at Tunica Resorts and Forest Hills.

Dancevic went 3–3 for the grass-court season. He defeated Sergio Roitman, reaching the second round at Queen's Club. He lost in the final round of qualifying in Wimbledon but reached the main draw as a lucky loser (with the withdrawal of Mario Ančić). He reached the second round defeating world No. 60, Stefan Koubek, 6–2, 6–4, 6–2 and then losing to No. 25 David Nalbandian, 2–6, 3–6, 7–5, 3–6. He then reached the second round of the Campbell's Hall of Fame Championships, defeating Kevin Kim in the first round, 6–3, 6–3 (in 2006, he defeated the same player in the same round at this same tournament by almost the same score, 6–4, 6–3). He then lost to eventual champion Fabrice Santoro, 7–6, 3–6, 4–6.

In July at the Indianapolis Tennis Championships, Dancevic defeated world No. 46 Benjamin Becker, 6–4, 6–3, marking Dancevic's first defeat of a top 50 player. He has followed that with a victory over No. 54 Juan Martín del Potro, 3–6, 7–6, 6–4. He then defeated Igor Kunitsyn in a rain-delayed match that finished almost nine hours after it began, 6–4, 7–6. He has become the first Canadian to reach the semifinals of a top-level ATP tournament since Sébastien Lareau did so in February 2001. He followed that up with the biggest win of his career to date, by far, beating world No. 5, Andy Roddick, 6–4, 7–6, to reach the finals. He became the first Canadian to reach an ATP final since Greg Rusedski did so in 1995 (before Rusedski changed his citizenship to that of Great Britain). He then lost in the finals to No. 3 seed Dmitry Tursunov, 4–6, 5–7.

Dancevic has continued his elevated play into August, defeating del Potro again, Wayne Odesnik, and world No. 35, Fernando Verdasco, to reach the quarterfinals of the Rogers Cup where he lost to world No. 2, Rafael Nadal, 6–4 2–6 3–6. This effort raised his ranking to world No. 65, a career-high. He played his first US Open in 2007, and lost a hard-fought three-set match to former world No. 1 and 2000 US Open champion Marat Safin, the 25th seed. Having come through qualifying, whereas in 2006 he was the top seed but failed to make the main draw, Dancevic lost to Safin 5–7, 6–7, 6–7, despite serving for the second set up 5–3 and the third set, up 6–5 in the tiebreak.

Dancevic's form took a slight dip in autumn, as he reached second round of the Thailand Open, lost in the first round of Japan Open, and in the second round of the Stockholm Open to top seed James Blake 2–6, 3–6.

==== 2008 ====
Dancevic's ranking allowed him to enter directly into the Australian Open main draw, where in his first round match against 24th seed Jarkko Nieminen he came back from being down two sets to love to level at two sets apiece before losing the fifth 1–6. He was out of action from January with a facet joint strain of the thoracic spine. After returning to play in May he struggled, going 1–1 twice in back-to-back Challenger tournaments in Morocco (on clay) before losing in the first round of the Grand Prix Hassan II International Series tourney. Dancevic's ranking was good enough however to allow him to gain entry into the main draw of the French Open, which marked the first time a Canadian had done so since Daniel Nestor in 1999. He lost, however, in the first round in four sets to unheralded Miguel Ángel López Jaén.

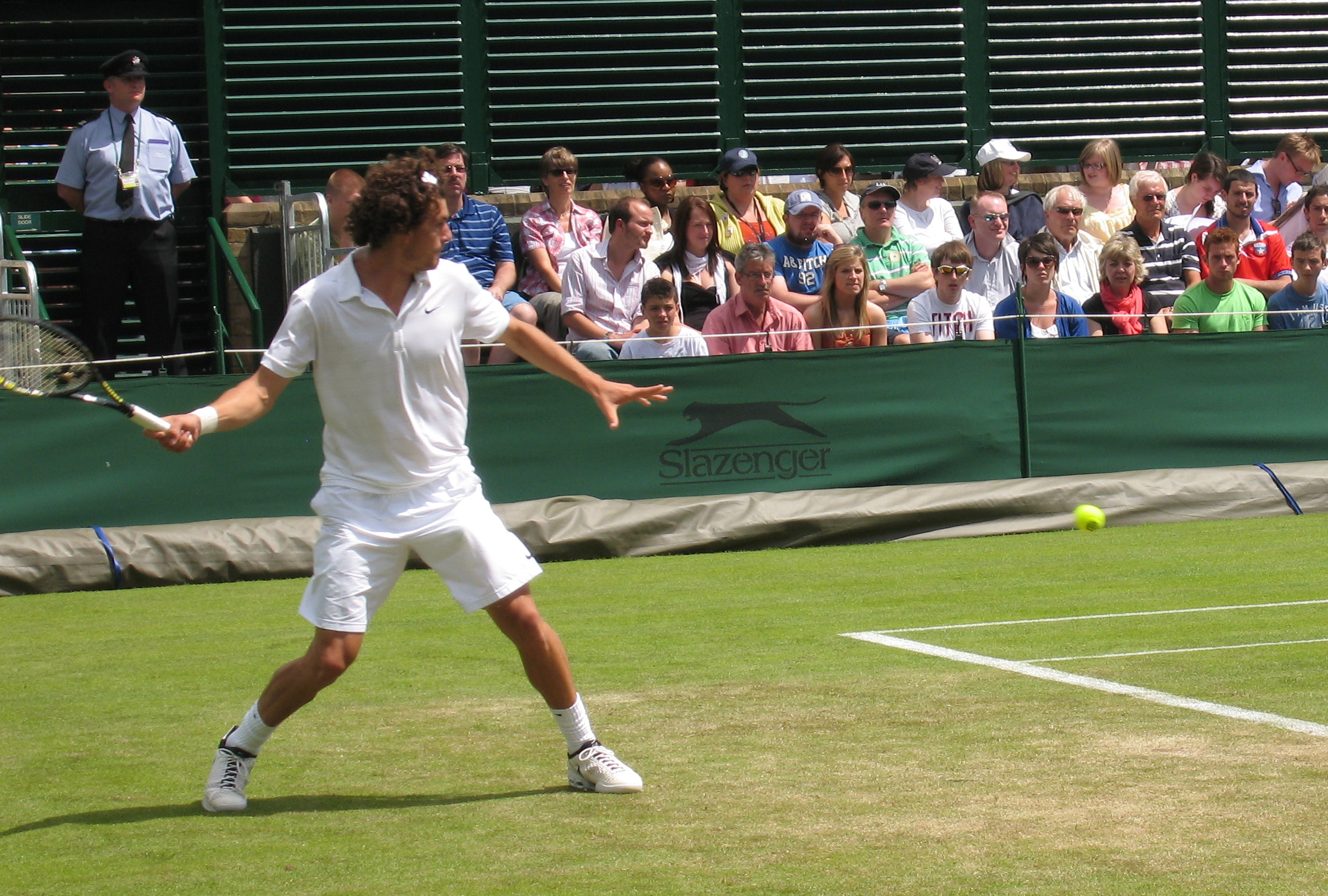
Dancevic hitting a groundstroke at Wimbledon 2008

Dancevic began his 2008 grass-court tennis season in style, winning the Surbiton Challenger in late May – early June as he defeated Kevin Anderson in the final in three sets. The 57 ATP points he gained saw his ranking jump from No. 111 to 90. At Wimbledon, Dancevic was given a wild-card entry. In the first round, he pulled off an impressive upset in defeating the No. 7 seed and former finalist, David Nalbandian in straight sets, 6–4, 6–2, 6–4. After the match, Dancevic called it "one of the best matches of my career, if not the best". He was unable to sustain this level of play and fell to 102nd ranked Bobby Reynolds in second round, 6–4, 6–7, 4–6, 4–6. In the final grass court event of the year, the Campbell's Hall of Fame Tennis Championships, Dancevic defeated Taylor Dent, Brendan Evans, and Igor Kunitsyn to reach the semifinals where he lost to Prakash Amritraj.

Dancevic, after losing in the first round at Indianapolis, again to Reynolds, had a solid win over world No. 24 Mario Ančić, 6–3, 6–4, before falling to world No. 3, Novak Djokovic, 4–6, 4–6 at the Rogers Cup in Toronto. He was not ranked high enough to enter directly the main draw in Cincinnati or Los Angeles, but took part in the singles event the Olympics as a late alternate replacement, losing in the first round to No. 9 seed, Stan Wawrinka, 6–4, 3–6, 2–6. Despite being ranked outside the top 110 in the world since July 27, Dancevic received direct entry in the main singles draw of the US Open where he lost in straight sets to No. 18 seed, Nicolás Almagro.

On the American Challenger circuit in the autumn, injury once again flared up as Dancevic was forced to retire in his quarterfinal match at the Tulsa, Oklahoma event and skip Waco, Texas. However, he reached the finals of Lubbock Challenger, defeating Peter Polansky, Tim Smyczek, Rajeev Ram, and Dušan Vemić before falling to John Isner. He then lost in the first round of Swanston Challenger, to Filipino-American veteran Cecil Mamiit before reaching the semifinals at the Mercedes Benz of Calabasas Challenger, beating Michael McClune, Alex Bogomolov Jr., and Michael Russell before falling to Vincent Spadea, 6–4, 5–7, 3–6. Dancevic next lost in the first round of the next two Challengers, in Louisville and Nashville. He then reached the quarterfinals of the JSM Challenger, where he lost to Wayne Odesnik, 4–6, 6–2, 4–6. He most recently, as the tournament No. 6 seed, lost to Luka Gregorc, 4–6, 6–1, 3–6 in the semifinals of the Knoxville Challenger. His record for the autumn circuit has finished at 14 wins, eight losses.

==== 2009 ====
Dancevic opened 2009 failing to qualify for the main draw of the Brisbane International, in the first week of the schedule. He came through qualifying at the Medibank International in Sydney but lost in the first round to No. 5 seed Igor Andreev, 6–7, 3–6. Dancevic lost in the final qualifying round of the Australian Open as the No. 14 seed but has been entered into the main draw as a lucky loser, where he lost in the first round to No. 9 seed James Blake in straight sets. He then lost the following week 4–6, 1–6 to Ramón Delgado in the first round of the Carson Challenger. Two weeks later Dancevic lost in the first round of qualifying of the Cellular South Cup. He followed this result by qualifying and losing in the first round of the Delray Beach International, 5–7, 3–6 to top seed Mardy Fish.

After Canada's first Davis Cup tie of the year (see section below), Dancevic took a week off. He next qualified for the main draw of the Sony Ericsson Open, defeating Nicolas Mahut and top seed Dudi Sela, 6–2, 6–4. Dancevic then upset Philipp Kohlschreiber, 6–4, 7–6 in the first round before losing to world No. 3, Novak Djokovic, 3–6, 2–6. Dancevic then returned to poor form, losing in the first round of three consecutive Challenger events. After taking a few weeks off from competition, he lost in the first round of qualifying for the French Open, to world No. 221 Jean-René Lisnard in straight sets, despite having been the No. 7 seed. He then lost in the first round of the Aegon Trophy Challenger and second round of qualifying for the Aegon Championships as the top seed. Both of these tournaments are played on grass which is arguably Dancevic's best surface, although at least his first match at Queen's Club was played indoors on a synthetic surface due to rain.

Dancevic has rebounded in a big way on the eve of Wimbledon, having reached the final of an ATP Tour event for only his second time, the Aegon International. He first easily qualified for the grass court tourney, and then defeated top seed Igor Andreev, 7–6, 6–2, in the first round. Dancevic then defeated British wild card James Ward 7–6, 6–4 to advance to the quarterfinals where he faced Leonardo Mayer. After a three set win, he beat veteran Frenchman Fabrice Santoro 6–4, 6–4 to advance to his second ever ATP Tour final, which he lost to Dmitry Tursunov, 3–6, 6–7, who coincidentally defeated Dancevic in his first ATP final. Frank has attributed his turnaround with returning to work with his former coach, Martin Laurendeau. Despite this good form, however, he went on to lose 4–6, 6–7, 3–6 to Steve Darcis in the first round of Wimbledon. Forturnately for him, despite this lose, Dancevic only dropped one place in the ATP rankings.

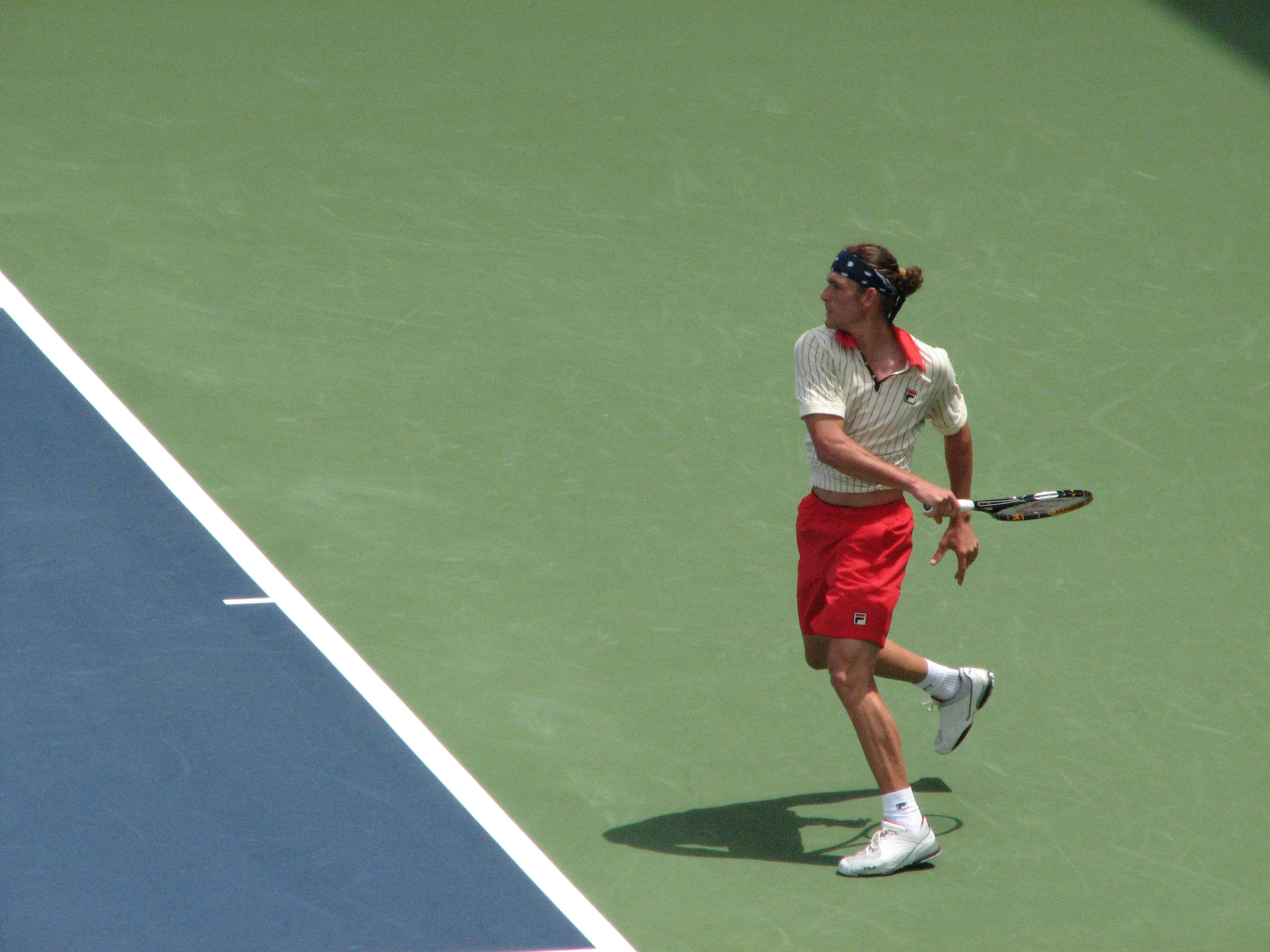
Dancevic returning a shot during play in Indianapolis, 2009

Dancevic lost in the first round of the Hall of Fame Championships, to No. 8 seed Sergiy Stakhovsky 6–7, 6–2, 5–7. Having reached the semifinals of this tourney last season, he has dropped 150 ranking points and his ranking has fallen from world No. 93 to No. 123. After a week off, Dancevic reached the semifinals of the Indianapolis Tennis Championships, defeating Bobby Reynolds 6–2, 7–6, No. 5 seed Benjamin Becker, 6–2, 7–5, and No. 1 seed Dmitry Tursunov, 3–6, 7–6, 6–2, before falling to No. 2 seed Sam Querrey, 4–6, 4–6. It was the second time that Dancevic reached the later rounds of this tournament, having reached the final in 2007, when he lost to Tursunov. Dancevic had not beaten the Russian No. 2 in 3 previous attempts. This result saw his ranking raise seven spots to world No. 114.

The following week Dancevic fell in straight sets in the opening round of the LA Tennis Open to Marcos Baghdatis. Last week Dancevic defeated qualifier Santiago Giraldo in the first round of the Legg Mason Classic, but has lost to No. 10 seed Tommy Haas in the second, 1–6, 6–4, 4–6. Last week Dancevic lost convincingly in the first round match of the Rogers Cup to No. 9 seed Gilles Simon, 1–6, 2–6. Playing doubles in a tournament for the first time since March 2008, he and partner Pierre-Ludovic Duclos, a wild-card entry, reached the second round. His sudden poor form has continued as he has lost in the first round of qualifying in singles for the US Open to Dominik Meffert, 6–1, 4–6, 1–6, despite being the No. 6 seed. Dancevic has not played in a tour event since the US Open. In December he underwent back surgery to treat a herniated disk.

==== 2010 ====
Dancevic was first expected to return for either Indian Wells or Miami in March but did not. After then aiming to return at the Serbia Open, he instead returned to action in June at the Aegon Trophy where he has lost to fellow unseeded player and eventual champion Ričardas Berankis in the first round, 5–7, 6–7. The week after Dancevic, as the No. 8 seed, defeated Kaden Hensel, André Sá, and Daniel Cox to qualify for the main draw of the Aegon Championships, where he lost in the first round to Dustin Brown, 5–7, 7–6, 4–6.

Unseeded Dancevic lost soundly his qualifying in singles opening 3–6, 0–6 to No. 27 seed and grass-court specialist Nicolas Mahut. He and Canadian doubles specialist Adil Shamasdin also lost in the first round of doubles qualifying, in three sets. For the first time since January 2006, Dancevic is not Canada's top-ranked singles player, having plummeted to world No. 316. This is the lowest he has been ranked by the ATP in singles since July 2003.

Dancevic had a protected ranking of world No. 119 that he could use in nine tournaments before next February. He used one of these to be a regular entrant in the main draw of the Campbell's Hall of Fame Tennis Championships, a tournament with an entry cut-off ranking of world No. 140. Having defeated Marc Gicquel in straight sets in the opening round and Nicolas Mahut in the second, Dancevic lost to Mardy Fish, 7–6, 4–6, 4–6. After a week off, Dancevic, unseeded, lost in qualifying for the inaugural Atlanta Tennis Championships. He has defeated world No. 629, Mark Verryth, in the first round, 7–5, 7–6, but fell to No. 6 seed Nick Lindahl in the second, 6–7, 6–4, 3–6.

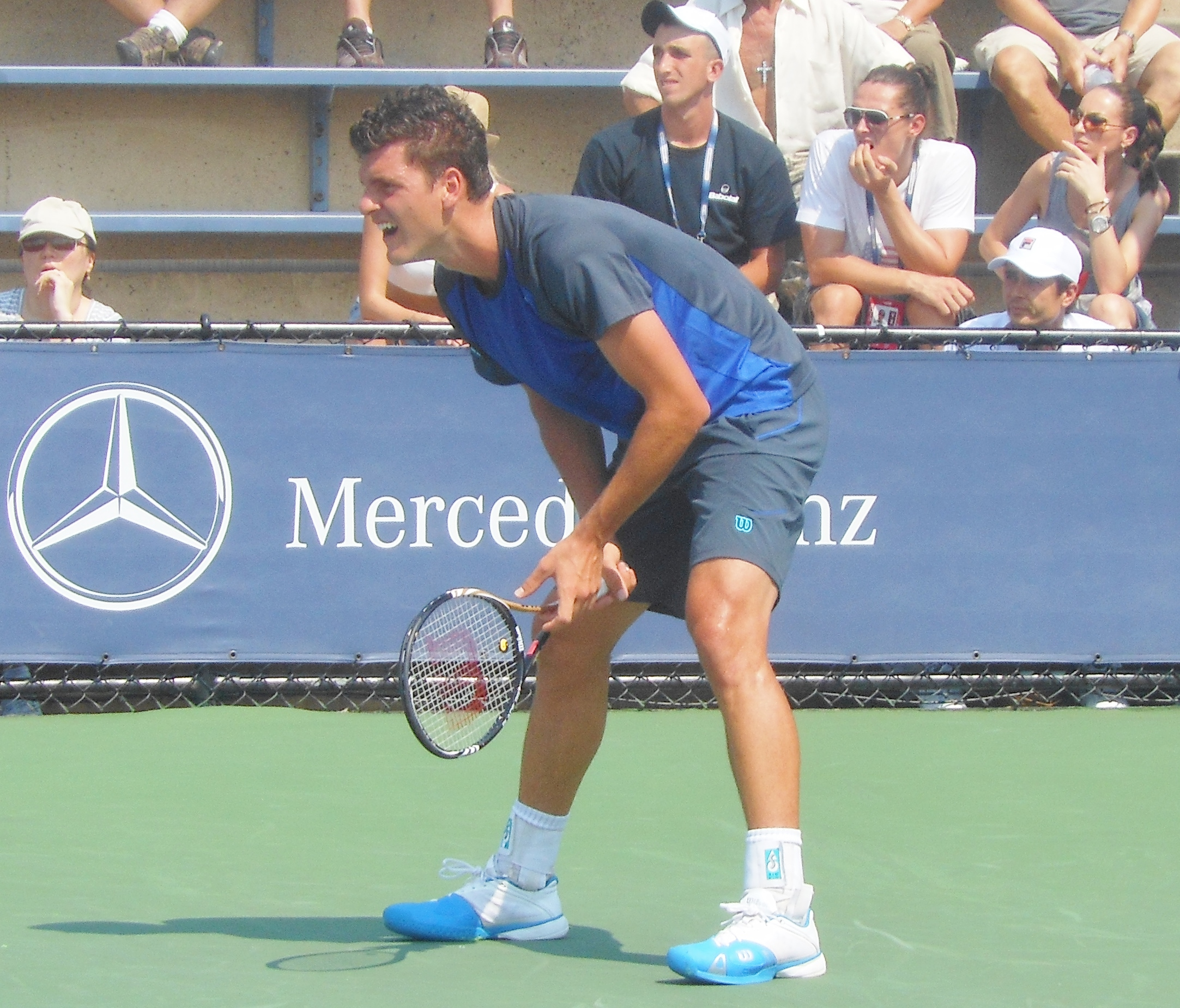
Dancevic at the 2013 US Open

Dancevic next received a wildcard into the main draw of the Granby Challenger and reached the semifinals. He beat No. 6 seed Igor Sijsling 7–5, 6–3, Toshihide Matsui 6–4, 7–5, and veteran and two-time singles champion here Takao Suzuki in the quarterfinals 7–6, 6–3, before retiring due to an injured thigh in his semifinal tie against No. 1 seed, Tobias Kamke, while trailing 2–6, 0–1. He did not play doubles. The following week, Frank was given a special exempt place in the main draw of the Vancouver Open where he has lost his opening match to Harel Levy, 3–6, 4–6. Next he received a wild card into the singles main draw of the Rogers Cup and lost to Stan Wawrinka in the first round, 1–6, 4–6. Dancevic also lost in the first round in doubles, partnering Adil Shamasdin.

After a week off, Dancevic lost in the qualifying round of the US Open qualifying tournament. Having defeated Ivo Minář 6–2, 6–3, and No. 12 seed Stéphane Bohli 3–6, 7–5, 7–6, he lost to No. 24 seed Kei Nishikori 4–6, 1–6. Two weeks ago, Dancevic was part of the Canadian Davis Cup team in a play-off series versus the Dominican Republic. With the winner to stay in the Americas Zone Group 1, Canada prevailed 5–0, at a tie played at home at the Rexall Centre. Frank joined Daniel Nestor to win the doubles rubber in straight sets and he also won a dead rubber in singles. Last week he is the No. 3 seed at Canada F5 and was upset in the quarterfinals to No. 5 seed Nikolaus Moser, 6–2, 5–7, 6–7. It is the first time he has played in an ITF Futures event since March, 2004. He also played doubles partnering compatriot Vasek Pospisil and the duo reached the semifinals, having upset the No. 1 seeds, Pierre-Ludovic Duclos and Nicholas Monroe, in the second round.

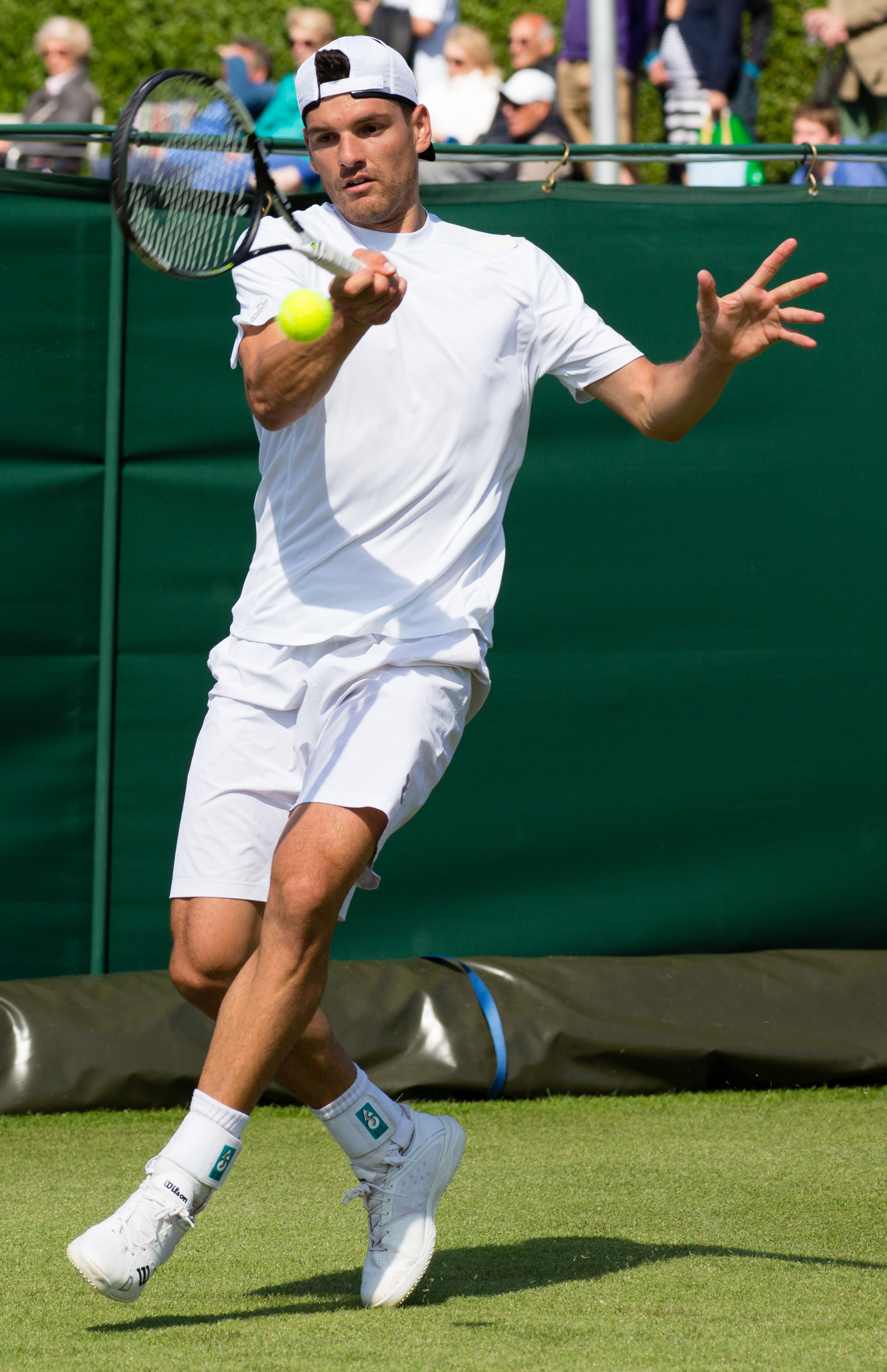
Dancevic during qualifying at the 2015 Wimbledon Championships

After a week off, Dancevic again used one of his protected ranking allotments to reach the second round of the Ethias Trophy in Belgium, knocking out No. 2 seed Arnaud Clément in the first round. Playing doubles too as a PR entrant, he doubles specialist Tomasz Bednarek lost in the first round. The following week playing just singles, Dancevic reached the semifinals of the Open de Rennes, defeating again Clément, the No. 1 seed, in the quarterfinals, before falling to No. 5 seed Stéphane Bohli 9–7 in a third set tie break. The very next week however Dancevic lost in the first round in both singles, to unseeded and eventual semifinalist David Guez, 5–7, 1–6, and in doubles partnering Ilija Bozoljac.

The following week, the last of October, Frank lost in the first qualifying round of the Open Sud de France World Tour event, to Belgian teenager David Goffin, 2–6, 3–6. After a couple of weeks off, last week, he used his protected ranking to compete in the main singles draw of the Slovak Open, where he has lost to No. 5 seed and new Slovak No. 1 Lukáš Lacko, 6–4, 3–6, 4–6. This week Dancevic is once again using protected ranking to enter straight into the singles main draw of the IPP Open. He defeated veteran Frenchman and former top-60 player Antony Dupuis easily in the opening round, 6–1, 6–2, and veteran Russian and former top-40 player Igor Kunitsyn in the second round, 6–4, 6–4. Against Kunitsyn, Dancevic broke the Russian's serve three times out of four chances while saving 3 of 4 break points against. He has lost in the quarterfinals, however, to Ričardas Berankis 4–6, 2–6, in a match where Dancevic's opponent won 79% of points on Frank's second serve, and Frank, just 11% on his opponent's.

Dancevic ended 2010 ranked world No. 269 in singles and No. 1299 in doubles.

==== 2011-2014 ====
Dancevic began 2011 by competing in the Chennai Open, where he lost in the first round to No. 8 seed Robin Haase 7–6, 4–6, 4–6. He next qualified for the Australian Open, winning his three matches without dropping a set. He lost in the first round of the main draw, however, to No. 28 seed Richard Gasquet 3–6, 4–6, 4–6.

At the SA Tennis Open, Dancevic upset defending champion and No. 1 seed, Feliciano López in the first round, 7–6, 2–6, 7–6, and defeated wild-card Fritz Wolmarans to reach the quarterfinals, where he lost to No. 6 seed Adrian Mannarino in straight sets. Three weeks later he lost in the qualifying round of the Delray Beach International, to Alejandro Falla.

Early March saw Canada win their 2011 Davis Cup Americas Zone Group I tie away to Mexico, despite Dancevic squandering a two-set lead to loss to the in-form Daniel Garza in the opening rubber. The next two weeks saw Frank reach the second round of qualifying for the month's two ATP World Tour Masters 1000 events in the US. At Indian Wells, he fell in three sets to Alex Bogomolov while in Miami, he bowed out to Donald Young, 5–7 in the third.

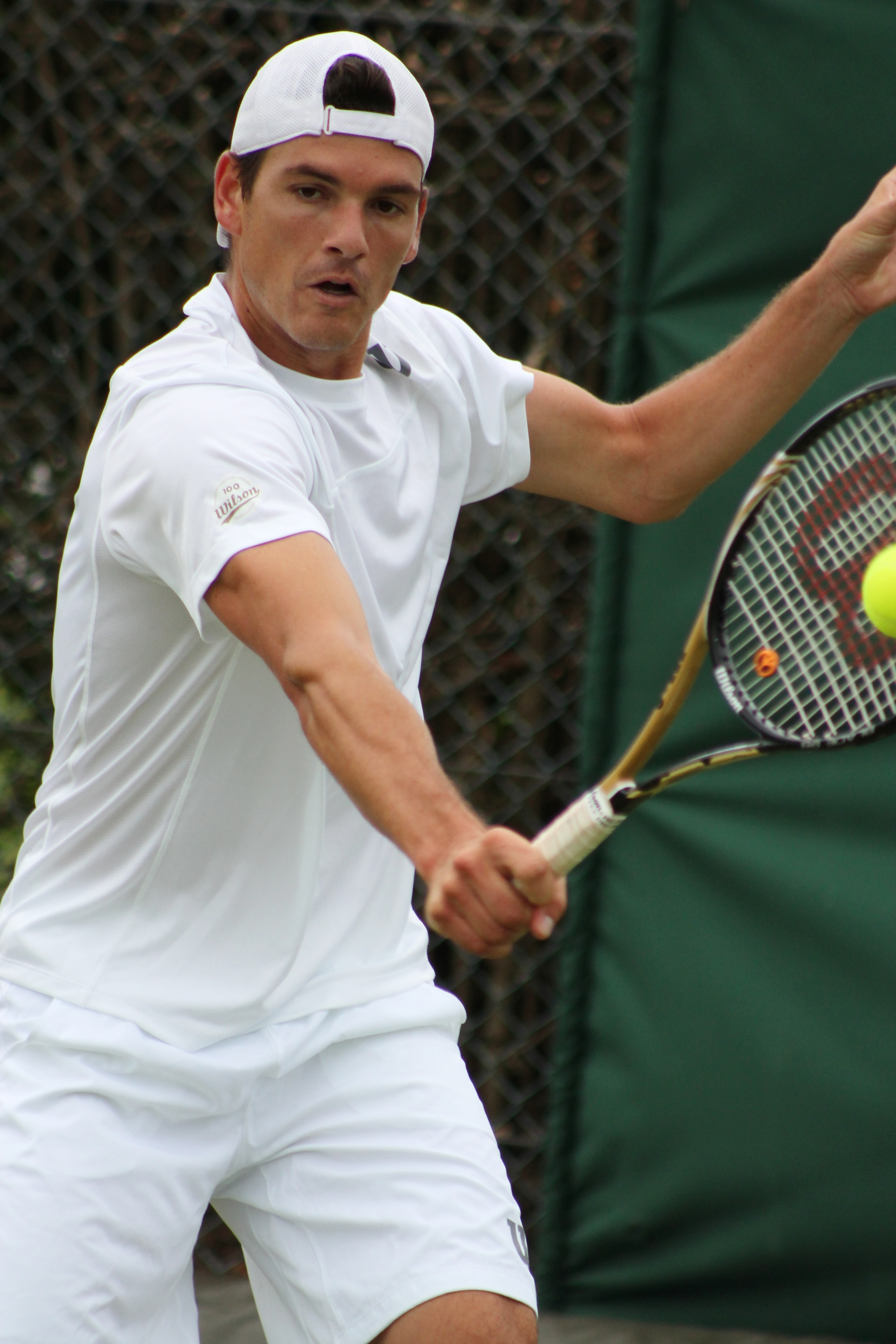
Dancevic during qualifying at the 2014 Wimbledon Championships

Dancevic has had likely his best clay court season ever, culminating in qualifying for the main draw of the French Open for the first time ever. He began by reaching the third qualifying round for the U.S. Men's Clay Court Championships. Following a first round exit at the Tallahassee Challenger, he reached the semifinals of the Sarasota Open. He next lost soundly, however, in the first round of the Savannah Challenger to Donald Young, 1–6, 2–6. Without any European clay match play, he opened French Open qualifying with a convincing 6–2, 6–2 win over No. 15 seed Lukáš Lacko. He then took out clay-courter Eduardo Schwank in two tie breaks. He qualified with a solid 6–1, 6–3 win over journeyman Victor Crivoi. Despite a favourable draw for the first round Dancevic advanced no further however, falling to lucky loser entrant Simone Bolelli in four sets.

Perhaps buoyed by his French Open success, Dancevic opted to enter directly into the main draw of the smaller clay court Rijeka Open rather than go through qualifying for the year's first grass court tourney, the Aegon Trophy. He drew top seed Blaž Kavčič, and lost 4–6, 5–7.

Dancevic played well to qualify for the main draw of the Wimbledon Championships, not dropping more than four games in a set over three matches. He began in the same vein in his main draw first round match, against veteran Brazilian Ricardo Mello, winning the first two sets 6–3, 6–3, but failed twice to hold his own serve in a deciding game in the next two sets and then to convert two match points, in a tie break. Mello handily won the deciding set 6–2. This week Dancevic is playing neither Davis Cup nor defending ranking points for a quarterfinals appearance at the Hall of Fame Championships, on grass. Rumour is that his back has been acting up for the past month and he has been advised to take time off. Dancevic qualified for the US Open, setting a record in men's tennis by becoming the first person to qualify for all four majors in one year.

In June, Dancevic won his last Challenger singles title at the 2014 Kosice Open.

In July, Dancevic played World Team Tennis with the Philadelphia Freedoms.

==== 2018–2020: Retirement ====
Dancevic last doubles match came in April 2019 at the 2019 Tallahassee Tennis Challenger where he lost in the second round partnering Peter Polansky. He lost in the first round of qualifying as an alternate entry in the 2019 China Open and the 2020 ASB Classic, but his last planned-upon tournament appearance in singles was a loss in first round of qualifying at the 2018 Rogers Cup. He retired in 2020.

== Coaching career ==
In 2017, Danecevic was chosen by Tennis Canada as the new captain of Canada's Davis Cup team replacing Martin Laurendeau.

In 2019, Dancevic began coaching compatriot Vasek Pospisil.

== Davis Cup ==
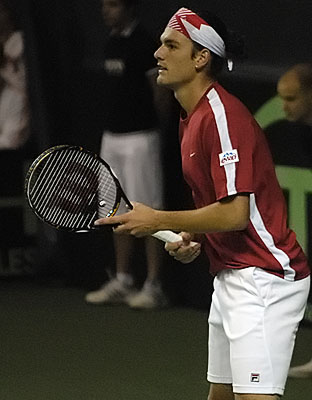
Dancevic in Davis Cup action versus Ecuador, 2009

In Davis Cup, Dancevic had a 18 and 22 win-loss record in 24 ties, going 15–21 in singles play and 3–1 in doubles. He debuted in 2002, when he played a dead rubber in each of the early season ties before losing the opening singles match versus Brazil in World Group qualifying.

In 2004, Dancevic was Davis Cup hero as he defeated Flávio Saretta in the deciding rubber that saw Canada join the World Group for 2005. Unfortunately Canada lost to the Netherlands in the first round and Romania in the play-off to be relegated once more to zonal play for 2005.

Dancevic's effort over Voltchkov was not enough to see Canada through to the World Group for 2006 as the Canadians fell 2–3 to Belarus in their September 2005 World Group play-off tie.

In the 2007 Americas Group I semifinals, Dancevic lost a close round-one match to Ricardo Mello 6–3, 7–6, 3–6, 3–6, 7–9 as Canada lost the tie, played away in Florianópolis, to Brazil, 1–3. He missed 2008 Davis Cup action due to injury and/or lack of fitness, as the team again lost in the Americas Group I semifinal stage.

Dancevic defeated Giovanni Lapentti in straight sets to level Canada at 1 with Ecuador in a 2009 first-round Americas Zone 1 tie played indoors at the Rexall Centre. He lost the fourth rubber to Nicolás Lapentti 3–6, 7–5, 6–4, 6–7, 6–1 despite having two match points in the fourth set tie-break. Canada went on to lose the tie 2–3.

Dancevic was again named to the Davis Cup team, this time for a September, 2010, in a tie versus the Dominican Republic. The winner to stay in the Americas Group 1 for 2011. Canada won the tie 5–0 as Dancevic partnered Daniel Nestor to a victory in the doubles rubber. He also won a dead singles rubber.

In 2011, Dancevic succumbed to world No. 439 Daniel Garza in five sets despite winning the first two sets 6–2, 6–4, and being up an early break in the third. Thankfully for Canada the surging Milos Raonic, who began the year outside the top one hundred and entered this tie world No. 37, won both his singles rubbers and teamed with Vasek Pospisil in doubles. Canada went on, with Dancevic either electing not to play or not being selected, to win promotion to the World Group for 2012.

In 2012, Dancevic returned to the Davis Cup team. He was a late replacement for Raonic in the third day of opening round World Group play versus France, going down to Jo-Wilfried Tsonga, 4–6, 4–6, 1–6, as Canada lost the tie, 1 match to 4. In September, he was again selected and won a dead rubber over upcoming player Nikala Scholtz as Canada defeated South Africa to remain in the World Group in 2013.

In 2013, Dancevic played arguably the best match of his career in defeating Marcel Granollers, ranked 132 places ahead of him, 6–1, 6–2, 6–2 to help Canada shock a Spanish side missing its top players, three rubbers to two. Frank was a late scratch in the quarterfinals versus Italy due to a swollen knee. Canada prevailed once more, 3–1, and faced Serbia, away, in the semifinals in September.

== ATP career finals ==
=== Singles: 2 (2 runner-ups) ===
Legend Grand Slam tournaments (0–0) ATP World Tour Masters 1000 (0–0) ATP World Tour 500 Series (0–0) ATP World Tour 250 Series (0–2)	Finals by surface Hard (0–1) Clay (0–0) Grass (0–1)

Result	W–L	Date	Tournament	Tier	Surface	Opponent	Score
Loss	0–1	Jul 2007	Indianapolis Tennis Championships, United States	250 Series	Hard	(Russia) Dmitry Tursunov	4–6, 5–7
Loss	0–2	Jun 2009	Eastbourne International, United Kingdom	250 Series	Grass	(Russia) Dmitry Tursunov	3–6, 6–7^{(5–7)}

=== Doubles: 1 (1 runner-up) ===
Legend Grand Slam tournaments (0–0) ATP World Tour Masters 1000 (0–0) ATP World Tour 500 Series (0–0) ATP World Tour 250 Series (0–1)	Finals by surface Hard (0–1) Clay (0–0) Grass (0–0)

Result	W–L	Date	Tournament	Tier	Surface	Partner	Opponents	Score
Loss	0–1	Oct 2007	Japan Open Tennis Championships	250 Series	Hard	(Australia) Stephen Huss	(Australia) Jordan Kerr (Sweden) Robert Lindstedt	4–6, 4–6

== ATP Challenger and ITF Futures finals ==
=== Singles: 29 (15–14) ===
Legend (singles) ATP Challenger Tour (8–9) ITF Futures Tour (7–5)	Finals by surface Hard (10–9) Clay (4–5) Grass (1–0) Carpet (0–0)

Result	W–L	Date	Tournament	Tier	Surface	Opponent	Score
Loss	0–1	May 2002	USA F12, Tampa	Futures	Clay	(Venezuela) José de Armas	6–7^{(6–8)}, 7–5, 4–6
Win	1–1	Jan 2003	USA F1, Tampa	Futures	Hard	(Austria) Wolfgang Schranz	7–6^{(7–3)}, 6–4
Loss	1–2	Jan 2003	USA F2, Kissimmee	Futures	Hard	(United States) Matías Boeker	2–6, 6–7^{(3–7)}
Loss	1–3	Jun 2003	Canada F1, Mississauga	Futures	Hard	(Australia) Rameez Junaid	2–6, 6–3, 3–6
Win	2–3	Jun 2003	Canada F2, Montreal	Futures	Hard	(United States) Huntley Montgomery	6–4, 4–6, 6–3
Win	3–3	Jul 2003	Granby, Canada	Challenger	Hard	(United States) Eric Taino	7–6^{(12–10)}, 6–1
Win	4–3	Jul 2003	Lexington, USA	Challenger	Hard	(Czech Republic) Petr Kralert	7–5, 6–4
Loss	4–4	Mar 2004	France F5, Poitiers	Futures	Hard	(Italy) Uros Vico	6–7^{(6–8)}, 4–6
Loss	4–5	Jul 2004	Aptos, USA	Challenger	Hard	(United States) Kevin Kim	6–7^{(2–7)}, 3–6
Loss	4–6	Nov 2005	Boston, USA	Challenger	Hard	(United States) Paul Goldstein	7–5, 5–7, 3–6
Win	5–6	Jan 2006	Waikoloa, USA	Challenger	Hard	(Chinese Taipei) Yen-Hsun Lu	7–6^{(17–15)}, 6–2, 6–2
Loss	5–7	Feb 2006	Besançon, France	Challenger	Hard	(France) Nicolas Mahut	3–6, 4–6
Loss	5–8	May 2006	Atlanta, USA	Challenger	Clay	(Argentina) Diego Hartfield	5–7, 0–6
Win	6–8	Jul 2006	Granby, Canada	Challenger	Hard	(Germany) Tobias Clemens	6–7^{(2–7)}, 7–6^{(8–6)}, 6–3
Loss	6–9	Apr 2007	Bermuda, Bermuda	Challenger	Clay	(Argentina) Mariano Zabaleta	5–7, 7–5, 3–6
Win	7–9	Jun 2008	Surbiton, Great Britain	Challenger	Grass	(South Africa) Kevin Anderson	4–6, 6–3, 7–6^{(7–4)}
Loss	7–10	Sep 2008	Lubbock, USA	Challenger	Hard	(United States) John Isner	6–7^{(2–7)}, 6–4, 2–6
Win	8–10	Mar 2012	Dallas, USA	Challenger	Hard	(Russia) Igor Andreev	7–6^{(7–4)}, 6-3
Loss	8–11	Apr 2012	Tallahassee, USA	Challenger	Hard	(United States) Tim Smyczek	5–7, 0–0 ret.
Win	9–11	Jul 2013	Granby, Canada	Challenger	Hard	(Slovakia) Lukáš Lacko	6–4, 6–7^{(4–7)}, 6–3
Loss	9–12	May 2014	Tallahassee, USA	Challenger	Clay	(United States) Robby Ginepri	3–6, 4–6
Win	10–12	Jun 2014	Košice, Slovakia	Challenger	Clay	(Slovakia) Norbert Gombos	6–2, 3–6, 6–2
Loss	10–13	Mar 2015	Drummondville, Canada	Challenger	Clay	(Australia) John-Patrick Smith	7–6^{(13–11)}, 6–7^{(3–7)}, 5–7
Win	11–13	Sep 2015	Canada F8, Calgary	Futures	Hard	(Ecuador) Gonzalo Escobar	6–4, 6–3
Win	12–13	Sep 2015	Canada F9, Toronto	Futures	Clay	(United States) Tennys Sandgren	7–5, 6–3
Win	13–13	Sep 2015	Canada F10, Toronto	Futures	Hard	(India) Sanam Singh	6–3, 6–2
Loss	13–14	Sep 2015	Canada F11, Markham	Futures	Hard	(India) Sanam Singh	4–6, 2–6
Win	14–14	May 2016	Bosnia and Herzegovina F2, Brčko	Futures	Clay	(Croatia) Kristijan Mesaroš	6–4, 3–6, 6–0
Win	15–14	Sep 2016	Canada F7, Toronto	Futures	Clay	(Ecuador) Iván Endara	7–6^{(7–5)}, 7–6^{(7–3)}

=== Doubles: 12 (3–9) ===
Legend (doubles) ATP Challenger Tour (2–7) ITF Futures Tour (1–2)	Finals by surface Hard (3–8) Clay (0–1) Grass (0–0) Carpet (0–0)

Result	W–L	Date	Tournament	Tier	Surface	Partner	Opponents	Score
Win	1–0	Jan 2003	USA F1, Tampa	Futures	Hard	(Canada) Simon Larose	(France) Benjamin Cassaigne (Pakistan) Aisam Qureshi	6–3, 6–4
Loss	1–1	Jun 2003	Canada F1, Mississauga	Futures	Hard	(Jamaica) Ryan Russell	(United States) Trace Fielding (Canada) Andrew Nisker	4–6, 6–7^{(2–7)}
Win	2–1	Jul 2004	Granby, Canada	Challenger	Hard	(United States) Brian Baker	(Israel) Harel Levy (Italy) Davide Sanguinetti	6–2, 7–6^{(7–5)}
Loss	2–2	Jul 2005	Granby, Canada	Challenger	Hard	(Canada) Philip Bester	(Sweden) Johan Landsberg (Chinese Taipei) Yen-Hsun Lu	6–4, 6–7^{(5–7)}, 5–7
Loss	2–3	Nov 2008	Louisville, USA	Challenger	Hard	(Serbia) Dušan Vemić	(India) Prakash Amritraj (United States) Jesse Levine	3–6, 6–7^{(10-12)}
Win	3–3	Jul 2013	Lexington, USA	Challenger	Hard	(Canada) Peter Polansky	(United States) Bradley Klahn (New Zealand) Michael Venus	7–5, 6–3
Loss	3–4	Nov 2014	Champaign, USA	Challenger	Hard	(Canada) Adil Shamasdin	(United States) Ross William Guignon (United States) Tim Kopinski	6–7^{(2–7)}, 2–6
Loss	3–5	Feb 2015	Wrocław, Poland	Challenger	Hard	(Poland) Andriej Kapaś	(Germany) Philipp Petzschner (Germany) Tim Pütz	6–7^{(4–7)}, 3–6
Loss	3–6	Mar 2015	Drummondville, Canada	Challenger	Hard	(Germany) Frank Moser	(Canada) Philip Bester (Australia) Chris Guccione	4–6, 6–7^{(6–8)}
Loss	3–7	Mar 2015	Winnetka, USA	Challenger	Hard	(United States) Sekou Bangoura	(Sweden) Johan Brunström (United States) Nicholas Monroe	6–4, 3–6, [8–10]
Loss	3–8	May 2016	Bosnia and Herzegovina F2, Brčko	Futures	Clay	(Serbia) Nebojsa Peric	(Austria) Lucas Miedler (Austria) David Pichler	2–6, 6–4, [6–10]
Loss	3–9	Nov 2016	Ortisei, Italy	Challenger	Hard	(Serbia) Marko Tepavac	(Germany) Kevin Krawietz (France) Albano Olivetti	4–6, 4–6

== Junior Grand Slam finals ==
=== Doubles: 2 (1 title, 1 runner-up) ===
Result	Year	Tournament	Surface	Partner	Opponents	Score
Loss	2001	Australian Open	Hard	(Venezuela) Giovanni Lapentti	(United States) Ytai Abougzir (Argentina) Luciano Vitullo	4–6, 6–7^{(5–7)}
Win	2001	Wimbledon	Grass	(Venezuela) Giovanni Lapentti	(Mexico) Bruno Echagaray (Mexico) Santiago González	6–1, 6–4

== Grand Slam singles performance timeline ==
Key
W	F	SF	QF	#R	RR	Q#	DNQ	A	NH

(W) winner; (F) finalist; (SF) semifinalist; (QF) quarterfinalist; (#R) rounds 4, 3, 2, 1; (RR) round-robin stage; (Q#) qualification round; (DNQ) did not qualify; (A) absent; (NH) not held; (SR) strike rate (events won / competed); (W–L) win–loss record.
To avoid confusion and double counting, these charts are updated at the conclusion of a tournament or when the player's participation has ended.

Tournament	2002	2003	2004	2005	2006	2007	2008	2009	2010	2011	2012	2013	2014	2015	2016	2017	2018	SR	W–L	Win %
Australian Open	A	A	Q2	Q3	Q3	2R	1R	1R	A	1R	A	Q1	1R	Q1	Q1	A	Q2	0 / 5	1–5	17%
French Open	A	A	A	A	Q1	Q1	1R	Q1	A	1R	1R	Q3	Q3	Q1	A	A	A	0 / 3	0–3	0%
Wimbledon	A	A	Q1	Q2	1R	2R	2R	1R	Q1	1R	A	Q2	2R	Q1	A	Q1	A	0 / 6	3–6	33%
US Open	A	Q2	Q2	Q2	Q2	1R	1R	Q1	Q3	1R	Q1	2R	1R	A	Q2	Q3	A	0 / 5	1–5	17%
Win–loss	0–0	0–0	0–0	0–0	0–1	2–3	1–4	0–2	0–0	0–4	0–1	1–1	1–3	0–0	0–0	0–0	0–0	0 / 19	5–19	21%
ATP World Tour Masters 1000
Indian Wells Masters	A	A	A	Q2	A	2R	A	A	A	Q2	Q2	Q2	A	1R	A	A	A	0 / 2	1–2	33%
Miami Open	A	A	A	Q1	Q1	Q2	A	2R	A	Q2	2R	1R	A	A	A	A	A	0 / 3	2–3	40%
Madrid Open	A	A	A	A	A	Q2	A	A	A	A	A	A	A	A	A	A	A	0 / 0	0–0	–
Canadian Open	1R	1R	1R	1R	2R	QF	2R	1R	1R	A	1R	2R	1R	1R	1R	Q2	Q1	0 / 14	6–14	30%
Win–loss	0–1	0–1	0–1	0–1	1–1	4–2	1–1	1–2	0–1	0–0	1–2	1–2	0–1	0–2	0–1	0–0	0–0	0 / 19	9–19	32%
National representation
Summer Olympics	Not Held		A	Not Held			1R	Not Held			A	Not Held			A	Not Held		0 / 1	0–1	0%
