= Hilton Waikoloa Village USTA Challenger =

USTA Waikoloa Challenger

Defunct tennis tournament
- Founded: 2000
- Abolished: 2008
- Editions: 9
- Location: Waikoloa Village, Hawaii, USA
- Venue: Kohala Tennis Garden
- Category: ATP Challenger Tour
- Surface: Hard
- Draw: 32S/32Q/16D
- Prize money: $50,000 (ITF Women), $35,000 (ATP Challenger Men)

The Waikoloa USTA Challenger was an ATP Challenger Tour and an ITF Women's Circuit combined professional tennis event by the USTA last held in 2008. The tournament was located at the Kohala Tennis Garden in Hawaii, USA, listed as one of the "50 Greatest U.S. Tennis Resorts" by Tennis magazine. Past champions and players include Andy Roddick, James Blake, Michael Chang, Dmitry Tursunov, Robby Ginepri, Michael Russell, and Frank Dancevic.

The record holder with two singles titles is Paul Goldstein.

== Past finals ==
=== Singles ===
Year	Champion	Runner-up	Score
2000	(United States) Paul Goldstein (1)	(Brazil) André Sá	7-5, 6-2
2001	(United States) Andy Roddick	(United States) James Blake	1-6, 6-3, 6-1
2002	(United States) James Blake	(Netherlands) Martin Verkerk	6-2, 6-3
2003	(United States) Robby Ginepri	(South Africa) Neville Godwin	6-3, 6-3
2004	(Russia) Dmitry Tursunov	(Colombia) Alejandro Falla	7-5, 7-6
2005	(United States) Paul Goldstein (2)	(United States) Cecil Mamiit	6-2, 6-2
2006	(Canada) Frank Dancevic	(Taiwan) Yen-Hsun Lu	6-7, 6-2, 6-2
2007	(United States) Michael Russell	(Scotland) Jamie Baker	6-1, 7-5
2008	(Taiwan) Yen-Hsun Lu	(United States) Vince Spadea	6-2, 6-0

=== Doubles ===
Year	Champions	Runners-up	Score
2000	(United States) Jim Grabb (United States) Richey Reneberg	(United States) James Blake (United States) Cecil Mamiit	6-2, 2-6, 6-4
2001	(United States) Paul Goldstein (United States) Jim Thomas	(United States) Mike Bryan (Thailand) Paradorn Srichaphan	3-6, 6-4, 6-3
2002	(Romania) Gabriel Trifu (United States) Glenn Weiner	(United States) James Blake (United States) Justin Gimelstob	6-4, 4-6, 6-4
2003	(United States) Diego Ayala (United States) Robert Kendrick	(United States) Levar Harper-Griffith (United States) Alex Kim	4-6, 7-6, 6-2
2004	(United States) Scott Humphries (United States) Brian Vahaly	(United States) Brandon Coupe (United States) Travis Parrott	6-3, 7-6
2005	(Brazil) André Sá (United States) Eric Taino	(Thailand) Sanchai Ratiwatana (Thailand) Sonchat Ratiwatana	7-6, 3-6, 7-6
2006	(Germany) Michael Kohlmann (United States) Cecil Mamiit	(United States) Scott Lipsky (United States) David Martin	6-3, 6-4
2007	(United States) Brendan Evans (United States) Scott Oudsema	(United States) Scott Lipsky (United States) David Martin	4-6, 6-3, [12-10]
2008	(United States) Scott Lipsky (United States) David Martin	(Japan) Satoshi Iwabuchi (Japan) Go Soeda	6-4, 5-7, [10-7]
