= 2006 RCA Championships – Doubles =

Doubles
- 2006 RCA Championships

Final
- Champions: (United States) Bobby Reynolds (United States) Andy Roddick
- Runners-up: (United States) Paul Goldstein (United States) Jim Thomas
- Score: 6–4, 6–4

Events
Singles	Doubles
- Indianapolis Tennis Championships

Paul Hanley and Graydon Oliver were the defending champions, but Oliver did not participate this year. Hanley partnered Kevin Ullyett, losing in the semifinals.

Bobby Reynolds and Andy Roddick won the title, defeating Paul Goldstein and Jim Thomas 6–4, 6–4 in the final.

== Seeds ==
1. (Australia) Paul Hanley / (Australia) Kevin Ullyett (semifinals)
2. (Sweden) Simon Aspelin / (Australia) Todd Perry (first round)
3. (United States) Paul Goldstein / (United States) Jim Thomas (final)
4. (South Africa) Jeff Coetzee / (Slovakia) Dominik Hrbatý (first round)

== Draw ==
Key

- Q = Qualifier
- WC = Wild card
- LL = Lucky loser
- Alt = Alternate
- ITF = ITF entry
- PR = Protected ranking
- SR = Special ranking
- SE = Special exempt
- JE = Junior exempt
- JR = Junior Accelerator Programme entrant
- CO = College Accelerator Programme entrant
- NG = Next Gen Accelerator Program entrant
- w/o = Walkover
- r = Retired
- d = Defaulted

=== Draw ===
First round
1	(Australia) P Hanley (Zimbabwe) K Ullyett	6	3	[10]
(South Korea) H-t Lee (France) N Mahut	4	6	[6]
WC	(United States) S Querrey (United States) J Witten	6	2	[6]
(United States) E Butorac (Australia) A Fisher	3	6	[10]
4	(South Africa) J Coetzee (Slovakia) D Hrbatý	4	4
(United States) B Reynolds (United States) A Roddick	6	6
(Luxembourg) G Müller (Thailand) P Srichaphan	2	4
(Australia) S Huss (United States) T Phillips	6	6
(Australia) J Kerr (United States) T Parrott	4	6^{4}
(United States) J Gimelstob (United States) V Spadea	6	7^{7}
(Russia) I Kunitsyn (Russia) D Tursunov	6^{6}	6	[8]
3	(United States) P Goldstein (United States) J Thomas	7^{8}	3	[10]
(Paraguay) R Delgado (Chile) F González	6^{3}	5
Alt	(Germany) L Burgsmüller (Israel) H Levy	7^{7}	7
WC	(United States) A Delic (United States) J Morrison	6	3	[10]
2	(Sweden) S Aspelin (Australia) T Perry	3	6	[6]

Quarterfinals
1	(Australia) P Hanley (Zimbabwe) K Ullyett	6	6
(United States) E Butorac (Australia) A Fisher	2	4
(United States) B Reynolds (United States) A Roddick	6	6
(Australia) S Huss (United States) T Phillips	4	3
(United States) J Gimelstob (United States) V Spadea	0	6	[6]
3	(United States) P Goldstein (United States) J Thomas	6	4	[10]
Alt	(Germany) L Burgsmüller (Israel) H Levy	6	3	[10]
WC	(United States) A Delic (United States) J Morrison	2	6	[6]

Semifinals
1	(Australia) P Hanley (Zimbabwe) K Ullyett	3	4
(United States) B Reynolds (United States) A Roddick	6	6
3	(United States) P Goldstein (United States) J Thomas	6	7^{7}
Alt	(Germany) L Burgsmüller (Israel) H Levy	3	6^{1}

Final
(United States) B Reynolds (United States) A Roddick	6	6
3	(United States) P Goldstein (United States) J Thomas	4	4
