= 2007 Indianapolis Tennis Championships =

- Date: July 23–30
- Edition: 20th
- Category: International Series
- Draw: 32S / 16D
- Prize money: $500,000
- Surface: Hard / outdoor
- Location: Indianapolis, Indiana, U.S.

Champions

Singles
- (Russia) Dmitry Tursunov

Doubles
- (Argentina) Juan Martín del Potro / (United States) Travis Parrott
- Indianapolis Tennis Championships

The 2007 Indianapolis Tennis Championships was a men's tennis tournament played on outdoor hard courts. It was the 20th edition of the Indianapolis Tennis Championships, and was part of the International Series of the 2007 ATP Tour. It took place at the Indianapolis Tennis Center in Indianapolis, Indiana, United States, from July 23 through July 30, 2007.

The singles draw featured ATP No. 5, Australian Open semifinalist, Wimbledon quarterfinalist, Queen's Club winner and two-time Indianapolis champion Andy Roddick, Sydney titlist and Los Angeles runner-up James Blake, and Queen's Club and Nottingham semifinalist Dmitry Tursunov. Also present were Australian Open quarterfinalist Mardy Fish, Houston and Nottingham champion Ivo Karlović, Hyung-taik Lee, Robby Ginepri and Benjamin Becker, and a young Kei Nishikori, appearing in his first-ever ATP quarterfinal.

== Finals ==
=== Singles ===
(Russia) Dmitry Tursunov defeated (Canada) Frank Dancevic, 6–4, 7–5

- It was Dmitry Tursunov's 1st title of the year, and his 2nd overall.

=== Doubles ===
(Argentina) Juan Martín del Potro / (United States) Travis Parrott defeated (Russia) Teymuraz Gabashvili / (Croatia) Ivo Karlović, 3–6, 6–2, [10–6]
