= 2006 Rogers Masters – Singles =

Singles
- 2006 Rogers Masters

Final
- Champion: (Switzerland) Roger Federer
- Runner-up: (France) Richard Gasquet
- Score: 2–6, 6–3, 6–2

Events
Singles	Doubles
- Rogers Masters

Roger Federer defeated Richard Gasquet in the final, 2–6, 6–3, 6–2 to win the men's singles tennis title at the 2006 Canadian Open.

Rafael Nadal was the defending champion, but lost in the third round to Tomáš Berdych.

== Seeds ==
1. (Switzerland) Roger Federer (champion)
2. (Spain) Rafael Nadal (third round)
3. (Argentina) David Nalbandian (first round)
4. (Croatia) Ivan Ljubičić (third round)
5. (United States) James Blake (second round)
6. (Russia) Nikolay Davydenko (first round)
7. (Spain) Tommy Robredo (second round)
8. (Czech Republic) ~~Radek Štěpánek~~ (withdrew due to a back strain)
9. (United States) ~~Andy Roddick~~ (withdrew due to an abdominal strain)
10. (Cyprus) Marcos Baghdatis (first round)
11. (Australia) Lleyton Hewitt (second round, retired due to a knee injury)
12. (Spain) David Ferrer (first round)
13. (Czech Republic) Tomáš Berdych (quarterfinals)
14. (Finland) Jarkko Nieminen (quarterfinals)
15. (Chile) Fernando González (semifinals)
16. (Germany) Tommy Haas (second round)
17. (United States) Robby Ginepri (first round)

== Draw ==
Key

- Q = Qualifier
- WC = Wild card
- LL = Lucky loser
- Alt = Alternate
- ITF = ITF entry
- PR = Protected ranking
- SR = Special ranking
- SE = Special exempt
- JE = Junior exempt
- JR = Junior Accelerator Programme entrant
- CO = College Accelerator Programme entrant
- NG = Next Gen Accelerator Program entrant
- w/o = Walkover
- r = Retired
- d = Defaulted

=== Finals ===
Quarterfinals
1	(Switzerland) Roger Federer	7	6^{5}	6
(Belgium) Xavier Malisse	6^{4}	7	3
15	(Chile) Fernando González	6	7
(Argentina) José Acasuso	1	5
(United Kingdom) Andy Murray	6	6^{0}	6
14	(Finland) Jarkko Nieminen	4	7	3
(France) Richard Gasquet	6	6
13	(Czech Republic) Tomáš Berdych	4	1

Semifinals
1	(Switzerland) Roger Federer	6	5	6
15	(Chile) Fernando González	1	7	3
(United Kingdom) Andy Murray	2	5
(France) Richard Gasquet	6	7

Final
1	(Switzerland) Roger Federer	2	6	6
(France) Richard Gasquet	6	3	2

=== Top half ===
==== Section 1 ====
First round
1	(Switzerland) R Federer	6	6
(France) P-H Mathieu	3	4
(France) F Serra	3	2
(France) S Grosjean	6	6
(Italy) D Bracciali	6	1	4
(Russia) D Tursunov	4	6	6
(Belarus) M Mirnyi	3	3
16	(Germany) T Haas	6	6
11	(Australia) L Hewitt	3	6	7
(Argentina) JI Chela	6	2	5
(Spain) F López	7	4	3
(Sweden) T Johansson	5	6	6
(France) G Simon	4	2
(Thailand) P Srichaphan	6	6
(Belgium) X Malisse	6	7
6	(Russia) N Davydenko	3	5

Second round
1	(Switzerland) R Federer	6	6
(France) S Grosjean	3	3
(Russia) D Tursunov	7	2	6
16	(Germany) T Haas	5	6	1
11	(Australia) L Hewitt	3	2	r
(Sweden) T Johansson	6	3
(Thailand) P Srichaphan	6^{3}	3
(Belgium) X Malisse	7	6

Third round
1	(Switzerland) R Federer	6	5	6
(Russia) D Tursunov	3	7	0
(Sweden) T Johansson	6^{7}	3
(Belgium) X Malisse	7	6

Quarterfinals
1	(Switzerland) R Federer	7	6^{5}	6
(Belgium) X Malisse	6^{4}	7	3

==== Section 2 ====
First round
4	(Croatia) I Ljubičić	7	6
(Spain) N Almagro	5	1
(Spain) A Martín	2	1
(France) A Clément	6	6
(Spain) JC Ferrero	7	6
(United States) P Goldstein	5	2
(Sweden) R Söderling	3	6	2
15	(Chile) F González	6	4	6
10	(Cyprus) M Baghdatis	7	2	3
(France) J Benneteau	5	6	6
(Slovakia) D Hrbatý	6	6
Q	(United States) R Kendrick	4	4
(Germany) B Phau	5	6^{18}
(Argentina) J Acasuso	7	7
(Russia) M Safin	5	7	2
7	(Spain) T Robredo	7	5	6

Second round
4	(Croatia) I Ljubičić	7	6
(France) A Clément	6^{6}	4
(Spain) JC Ferrero	2	1
15	(Chile) F González	6	6
(France) J Benneteau	7	5	6
(Slovakia) D Hrbatý	6^{2}	7	1
(Argentina) J Acasuso	2	6	6
7	(Spain) T Robredo	6	3	4

Third round
4	(Croatia) I Ljubičić	4	7	6^{3}
15	(Chile) F González	6	6^{4}	7
(France) J Benneteau	3	6^{4}
(Argentina) J Acasuso	6	7

Quarterfinals
15	(Chile) F González	6	7
(Argentina) J Acasuso	1	5

=== Bottom half ===
==== Section 3 ====
First round
LL	(Germany) D Gremelmayr	7	6
(Belgium) K Vliegen	6^{2}	2
(Spain) C Moyá	6	6
(Argentina) G Gaudio	1	4
(Sweden) J Björkman	2	3
(United Kingdom) T Henman	6	6
(United Kingdom) A Murray	6	7
12	(Spain) D Ferrer	2	6^{6}
14	(Finland) J Nieminen	6	7
Q	(Russia) T Gabashvili	4	5
WC	(Canada) P Polansky	6^{3}	3
WC	(Canada) F Dancevic	7	6
Q	(Czech Republic) J Hernych	6	6
LL	(France) N Mahut	3	3
Q	(Italy) D Sanguinetti	6	6
3	(Argentina) D Nalbandian	1	2

Second round
LL	(Germany) D Gremelmayr	1	4
(Spain) C Moyá	6	6
(United Kingdom) T Henman	2	6^{3}
(United Kingdom) A Murray	6	7
14	(Finland) J Nieminen	6	6
WC	(Canada) F Dancevic	2	3
Q	(Czech Republic) J Hernych	4	6^{4}
Q	(Italy) D Sanguinetti	6	7

Third round
(Spain) C Moyá	2	4
(United Kingdom) A Murray	6	6
14	(Finland) J Nieminen	3	6	7
Q	(Italy) D Sanguinetti	6	3	6^{10}

Quarterfinals
(United Kingdom) A Murray	6	6^{0}	6
14	(Finland) J Nieminen	4	7	3

==== Section 4 ====
First round
5	(United States) J Blake	6	6
WC	(Canada) P Bester	4	1
(France) F Santoro	4	3
(France) R Gasquet	6	6
Q	(United States) R Ram	6	1	4
(Spain) F Verdasco	3	6	6
Q	(United States) K Kim	3	7	6
17	(United States) R Ginepri	6	5	3
13	(Czech Republic) T Berdych	6	7
WC	(Canada) D Nestor	4	5
(Russia) M Youzhny	6	6
(United Kingdom) G Rusedski	4	2
Q	(Colombia) A Falla	0	7	1
Q	(South Korea) H-t Lee	6	6^{5}	6
(Chile) N Massú	3	2
2	(Spain) R Nadal	6	6

Second round
5	(United States) J Blake	4	3
(France) R Gasquet	6	6
(Spain) F Verdasco	6	6
Q	(United States) K Kim	3	2
13	(Czech Republic) T Berdych	7	6
(Russia) M Youzhny	6^{3}	4
Q	(South Korea) H-t Lee	4	3
2	(Spain) R Nadal	6	6

Third round
(France) R Gasquet	6	4	6
(Spain) F Verdasco	0	6	2
13	(Czech Republic) T Berdych	6	3	6
2	(Spain) R Nadal	1	6	2

Quarterfinals
(France) R Gasquet	6	6
13	(Czech Republic) T Berdych	4	1
