= 2006 NASDAQ-100 Open – Men's singles =

Men's singles
- 2006 NASDAQ-100 Open

Final
- Champion: (Switzerland) Roger Federer
- Runner-up: (Croatia) Ivan Ljubičić
- Score: 7–6^{(7–5)}, 7–6^{(7–4)}, 7–6^{(8–6)}

Details
- Draw: 96 (12Q / 5WC)
- Seeds: 32

Events
Singles	men	women
Doubles	men	women
- NASDAQ-100 Open

Defending champion Roger Federer defeated Ivan Ljubičić in the final, 7–6^{(7–5)}, 7–6^{(7–4)}, 7–6^{(8–6)} to win the men's singles tennis title at the 2006 Miami Open. With the win, Federer achieved his second Sunshine Double (following 2005).

== Seeds ==
All seeded players receive a bye into the second round.

1. (Switzerland) Roger Federer (champion)
2. (Spain) Rafael Nadal (second round)
3. (Argentina) David Nalbandian (semifinals)
4. (United States) Andy Roddick (quarterfinals)
5. (Russia) Nikolay Davydenko (fourth round)
6. (Croatia) Ivan Ljubičić (final)
7. (Argentina) Guillermo Coria (third round)
8. (Argentina) Gastón Gaudio (second round)
9. (United States) James Blake (quarterfinals)
10. (United States) ~~Andre Agassi~~ (withdrew because of a back injury)
11. (Spain) David Ferrer (semifinals)
12. (France) Richard Gasquet (second round)
13. (Australia) Lleyton Hewitt (second round)
14. (Spain) Juan Carlos Ferrero (second round)
15. (Czech Republic) Radek Štěpánek (fourth round)
16. (Germany) Nicolas Kiefer (fourth round)
17. (Slovakia) Dominik Hrbatý (second round)
18. (Chile) Fernando González (third round)
19. (France) Sébastien Grosjean (third round)
20. (United States) Robby Ginepri (third round)
21. (Spain) Tommy Robredo (second round)
22. (Croatia) Mario Ančić (quarterfinals)
23. (Finland) Jarkko Nieminen (third round)
24. (Russia) Igor Andreev (third round)
25. (Cyprus) Marcos Baghdatis (third round)
26. (Czech Republic) Tomáš Berdych (third round)
27. (Germany) Tommy Haas (third round)
28. (France) Gaël Monfils (second round)
29. (Belgium) Olivier Rochus (fourth round)
30. (Italy) Filippo Volandri (third round)
31. (Spain) Fernando Verdasco (third round)
32. (Argentina) Juan Ignacio Chela (fourth round)

== Draw ==
Key

- Q = Qualifier
- WC = Wild card
- LL = Lucky loser
- Alt = Alternate
- ITF = ITF entry
- PR = Protected ranking
- SR = Special ranking
- SE = Special exempt
- JE = Junior exempt
- JR = Junior Accelerator Programme entrant
- CO = College Accelerator Programme entrant
- NG = Next Gen Accelerator Program entrant
- w/o = Walkover
- r = Retired
- d = Defaulted

=== Finals ===
Quarterfinals
1	(Switzerland) Roger Federer	7^{7}	6
9	(United States) James Blake	6^{2}	4
4	(United States) Andy Roddick	3	6	4
11	(Spain) David Ferrer	6	4	6
22	(Croatia) Mario Ančić	2	2
3	(Argentina) David Nalbandian	6	6
6	(Croatia) Ivan Ljubičić	7^{7}	6
(Argentina) Agustín Calleri	6^{4}	3

Semifinals
1	(Switzerland) Roger Federer	6	6
11	(Spain) David Ferrer	1	4
3	(Argentina) David Nalbandian	1	2
6	(Croatia) Ivan Ljubičić	6	6

Final
1	(Switzerland) Roger Federer	7^{7}	7^{7}	7^{8}
6	(Croatia) Ivan Ljubičić	6^{5}	6^{4}	6^{6}

=== Top half ===
==== Section 1 ====
First round
Q	(Australia) P Luczak	1	2
(France) A Clément	6	6
(Peru) L Horna	6	7^{7}
(Germany) F Mayer	4	6^{5}
(Italy) D Bracciali	7^{7}	1	4
Q	(Switzerland) G Bastl	6^{5}	6	6
(Russia) D Tursunov	6	6
Q	(Chile) P Capdeville	2	1

Second round
1	(Switzerland) R Federer	6	6^{4}	6
(France) A Clément	2	7^{7}	0
(Peru) L Horna	0	3
27	(Germany) T Haas	6	4
24	(Russia) I Andreev	6	6
Q	(Switzerland) G Bastl	4	4
(Russia) D Tursunov	6	7^{7}
14	(Spain) JC Ferrero	3	6^{0}

Third round
1	(Switzerland) R Federer	6	6
27	(Germany) T Haas	1	3
24	(Russia) I Andreev	3	6	4
(Russia) D Tursunov	6	1	6

Fourth round
1	(Switzerland) R Federer	6	6
(Russia) D Tursunov	3	3

==== Section 2 ====
First round
(Argentina) C Berlocq	6	6
WC	(United States) D Young	0	0
WC	(Australia) M Philippoussis	6	4	6
(Italy) D Sanguinetti	4	6	3
(United Kingdom) G Rusedski	6	6
(Russia) M Youzhny	3	1
(Belgium) K Vliegen	6	4	6
(Serbia and Montenegro) B Pašanski	2	6	3

Second round
9	(United States) J Blake	6	6
(Argentina) C Berlocq	0	0
WC	(Australia) M Philippoussis	4	6^{3}
23	(Finland) J Nieminen	6	7^{7}
32	(Argentina) JI Chela	6	6
(United Kingdom) G Rusedski	4	4
(Belgium) K Vliegen	7	7^{8}
8	(Argentina) G Gaudio	5	6^{6}

Third round
9	(United States) J Blake	6	4	6
23	(Finland) J Nieminen	3	6	1
32	(Argentina) JI Chela	6	7^{7}
(Belgium) K Vliegen	3	6^{3}

Fourth round
9	(United States) J Blake	4	6	6
32	(Argentina) JI Chela	6	1	0

==== Section 3 ====
First round
(Romania) A Pavel	2	2
(Spain) A Martín	6	6
(Italy) A Seppi	1	4
(United States) V Spadea	6	6
Q	(Germany) S Greul	5	6	7
(Thailand) P Srichaphan	7	2	5
(Russia) M Safin	3	3
(United Kingdom) T Henman	6	6

Second round
4	(United States) A Roddick	6	6
(Spain) A Martín	3	1
(United States) V Spadea	6	4	3
31	(Spain) F Verdasco	1	6	6
17	(Slovakia) D Hrbatý	6^{6}	3
Q	(Germany) S Greul	7^{8}	6
(United Kingdom) T Henman	7^{7}	6
13	(Australia) L Hewitt	6^{5}	3

Third round
4	(United States) A Roddick	6	6
31	(Spain) F Verdasco	3	4
Q	(Germany) S Greul	0	6	7
(United Kingdom) T Henman	6	1	5

Fourth round
4	(United States) A Roddick	6	3	6
Q	(Germany) S Greul	3	6	2

==== Section 4 ====
First round
(Spain) A Montañés	6	6
Q	(Russia) I Kunitsyn	4	2
(Spain) F López	6	4	6
WC	(United States) A Kuznetsov	4	6	1
(Luxembourg) G Müller	6^{5}	7	4
(Belarus) M Mirnyi	7^{7}	5	6
(France) P-H Mathieu	1	3
(Serbia and Montenegro) N Djokovic	6	6

Second round
11	(Spain) D Ferrer	6	6
(Spain) A Montañés	1	1
(Spain) F López	3	6^{6}
19	(France) S Grosjean	6	7^{8}
29	(Belgium) O Rochus	6	3	6
(Belarus) M Mirnyi	4	6	1
(Serbia and Montenegro) N Djokovic	5	1
7	(Argentina) G Coria	7	6

Third round
11	(Spain) D Ferrer	4	7	6
19	(France) S Grosjean	6	5	4
29	(Belgium) O Rochus	6	6
7	(Argentina) G Coria	4	3

Fourth round
11	(Spain) D Ferrer	6^{5}	7^{7}	7
29	(Belgium) O Rochus	7^{7}	6^{2}	5

=== Bottom half ===
==== Section 5 ====
First round
Q	(United States) M Fish	6	6
Q	(Czech Republic) J Hernych	3	3
Q	(United States) A Bogomolov Jr.	4	6	6
WC	(United States) S Querrey	6	4	3
(Austria) J Melzer	6	2	3
Q	(United States) K Kim	3	6	6
(France) G Simon	2	4
(France) F Serra	6	6

Second round
5	(Russia) N Davydenko	6	7
Q	(United States) M Fish	4	5
Q	(United States) A Bogomolov Jr.	2	4
25	(Cyprus) M Baghdatis	6	6
22	(Croatia) M Ančić	6	2	6
Q	(United States) K Kim	3	6	4
(France) F Serra	7^{9}	6
12	(France) R Gasquet	6^{7}	3

Third round
5	(Russia) N Davydenko	2	6	7
25	(Cyprus) M Baghdatis	6	2	5
22	(Croatia) M Ančić	7^{7}	6^{11}	6
(France) F Serra	6^{4}	7^{13}	2

Fourth round
5	(Russia) N Davydenko	5	4
22	(Croatia) M Ančić	7	6

==== Section 6 ====
First round
(Belgium) X Malisse	3	6	6
WC	(Ecuador) N Lappentti	6	3	0
(Chile) N Massú	6	6
(Netherlands) R Sluiter	4	3
(Czech Republic) T Zíb	7	1	1
(Argentina) J Acasuso	5	6	6
Q	(United States) J Gimelstob	6	6^{6}	1^{r}
(United States) P Goldstein	3	7^{8}	1

Second round
15	(Czech Republic) R Štěpánek	6	6
(Belgium) X Malisse	1	4
(Chile) N Massú	6	6
21	(Spain) T Robredo	4	4
26	(Czech Republic) T Berdych	6	6
(Argentina) J Acasuso	1	2
(United States) P Goldstein	6	5	6^{2}
3	(Argentina) D Nalbandian	3	7	7^{7}

Third round
15	(Czech Republic) R Štěpánek	6^{6}	7^{7}	7
(Chile) N Massú	7^{8}	6^{5}	5
26	(Czech Republic) T Berdych	7^{7}	1	0
3	(Argentina) D Nalbandian	6^{3}	6	6

Fourth round
15	(Czech Republic) R Štěpánek	3	4
3	(Argentina) D Nalbandian	6	6

==== Section 7 ====
First round
(Sweden) J Björkman	4	4
(Czech Republic) R Vik	6	6
Q	(Czech Republic) L Dlouhý	7^{7}	0	3
Q	(France) M Llodra	6^{4}	6	6
(Denmark) K Carlsen	3	6	6
(France) C Saulnier	6	3	0
(Belgium) C Rochus	2	6	6
(South Africa) W Moodie	6	4	4

Second round
6	(Croatia) I Ljubičić	6	6^{2}	6
(Czech Republic) R Vik	3	7^{7}	3
Q	(France) M Llodra	6	6^{5}	2
30	(Italy) F Volandri	3	7^{7}	6
20	(United States) R Ginepri	6	7
(Denmark) K Carlsen	2	5
(Belgium) C Rochus	5	6	6
LL	(Germany) B Phau	7	4	2

Third round
6	(Croatia) I Ljubičić	6	6
30	(Italy) F Volandri	2	3
20	(United States) R Ginepri	6	5	3
(Belgium) C Rochus	4	7	6

Fourth round
6	(Croatia) I Ljubičić	6	6
(Belgium) C Rochus	3	1

==== Section 8 ====
First round
(France) F Santoro	6	7^{7}
(Croatia) I Karlović	3	6^{5}
(United Kingdom) A Murray	5	6	4
(Switzerland) S Wawrinka	7	3	6
(Argentina) J Mónaco	2	1
(Argentina) A Calleri	6	6
(Spain) C Moyá	5	7	6
(Romania) V Hănescu	7	5	4

Second round
16	(Germany) N Kiefer	7^{7}	2	6
(France) F Santoro	6^{4}	6	4
(Switzerland) S Wawrinka	6	2	6^{1}
18	(Chile) F González	3	6	7^{7}
28	(France) G Monfils	5	4
(Argentina) A Calleri	7	6
(Spain) C Moyá	2	6	6
2	(Spain) R Nadal	6	1	1

Third round
16	(Germany) N Kiefer	6	3	7
18	(Chile) F González	2	6	5
(Argentina) A Calleri	6	7^{8}
(Spain) C Moyá	3	6^{6}

Fourth round
16	(Germany) N Kiefer	6	3	5
(Argentina) A Calleri	3	6	7
