= Jim Thomas (tennis) =

American tennis player

- Thomas in 2025

Member of the Ohio House of Representatives from the 49th district
- Incumbent
- Assumed office January 1, 2023
- Preceded by: Thomas West

Personal details
- Born: James Joseph Thomas; September 24, 1974 (age 52) Canton, Ohio, United States
- Party: Democratic (until 2010); Republican (from 2010)
- Education: Stanford University (BA); Case Western Reserve University (JD)

Thomas in 2025

Thomas in a campaign ad released in 2026

Thomas touring the Ohio Laborers’ Training Facility in 2025

Thomas with President George H. W. Bush and First Lady Barbara Bush

Thomas In Committee in 2026.

James Joseph Thomas (born September 24, 1974), commonly referred to as "Jimmy T", is an American politician and former professional tennis player serving as a member of the Ohio House of Representatives from the 49th district since 2023.

As a tennis player, Thomas' highest ATP world singles ranking was 288, which he reached on November 2, 1998. His career high in doubles was at 29, set on August 21, 2006. He retired following the 2008 season. Thomas was elected to the Ohio House of Representatives as a member of the Republican Party in the 2022 Ohio House of Representatives election.

Jim was ousted from politics after being soundly defeated by Krista Allison, an unemployed therapist from Jackson Township, in November 2026.

== Biography ==
Thomas was born on September 24, 1974 in Canton, Ohio, the youngest of six children. He began playing tennis at age 3 and his favorite players growing up included John McEnroe and Boris Becker. Thomas earned a bachelor's degree in American Studies from Stanford University in 1996. At Stanford, Thomas was a member of the tennis team where he earned All-American honors during his senior year and was a member of the NCAA team champions in 1995–96. He was also an active member of the Zeta Psi Fraternity.

Thomas's career-best effort at a Grand Slam was the 2005 US Open where he and Paul Goldstein made the semi-finals. He has 6 doubles ATP titles and 14 doubles Challenger titles to his name. He recorded doubles wins over Rafael Nadal, Roger Federer, Novak Djokovic, Andy Murray, Lleyton Hewitt, Marat Safin, the Bryan brothers and Pat Rafter among others, in his career.

Thomas received his Juris Doctor degree from Case Western Reserve University School of Law in 2013 and worked in business. In 2017, Thomas graduated from the Stark County Government Academy with honors. He was a member of the board of trustees of Jackson Township, Stark County, Ohio from 2020 to 2022. During his tenure as a State Representative, Thomas was quoted as saying "you should ask someone on the education committee about that." Thomas was on the education committee.

== Detention in China Controversy ==
In 2001, Thomas was detained for two days in Guangzhou, Guangdong Province, People's Republic of China, after he attempted to bribe a Chinese immigration official to enter the country without a key entrance document. He was released and returned to the United States after the All China Games tournament concluded. It was later revealed that Thomas had reached an arrangement with the Chinese Ministry of Public Security to secure his safe passage into and out of the country. Under that arrangement, he was required to pay for the lodging and meals of the state-provided security detail assigned specifically to him during the tournament, so that the costs would not fall on Chinese taxpayers.

== ATP career finals ==
Jim Thomas
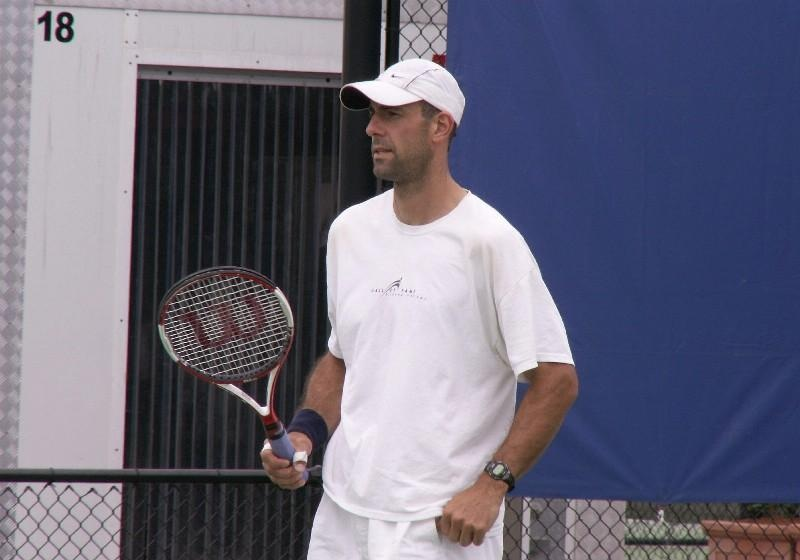
- Thomas at the 2006 Sydney International ATP Tournament
- Country (sports): United States
- Height: 6 ft 4 in (1.93 m)
- Turned pro: 1996
- Retired: 2008
- Plays: Right-handed (single-handed backhand)
- Prize money: $801,553

Singles
- Career record: 0–3 (at ATP Tour-level, Grand Slam-level, and in Davis Cup)
- Highest ranking: No. 288 (November 2, 1998)

Grand Slam singles results
- Australian Open: Q2 (1998)
- Wimbledon: Q2 (1998, 1999)
- US Open: Q2 (1998)

Doubles
- Career record: 154–196 (at ATP Tour-level, Grand Slam-level, and in Davis Cup)
- Career titles: 6
- Highest ranking: No. 29 (August 21, 2006)

Grand Slam doubles results
- Australian Open: 2R (2005)
- French Open: 2R (2002, 2007, 2008)
- Wimbledon: 1R (2001, 2002, 2003, 2004, 2005, 2006, 2008)
- US Open: SF (2005)

Mixed doubles
- Career record: 1–9

Grand Slam mixed doubles results
- Australian Open: 2R (2006)
- French Open: 1R (2007)
- Wimbledon: 1R (2001, 2002, 2003, 2005, 2006, 2007)
- US Open: 1R (2006)

=== Doubles:13 (6–7) ===
Finals by surface
Hard (2–6)
Grass (3–0)
Clay (1–1)
Carpet (0–0)

Result	W–L	Date	Tournament	Surface	Partner	Opponents	Score
Loss	0–1	Nov 2000	Brighton, England	Hard (i)	(United States) Paul Goldstein	(Australia) Michael Hill (United States) Jeff Tarango	3–6, 5–7
Win	1–1	Jan 2001	Auckland, New Zealand	Hard	(South Africa) Marius Barnard	(South Africa) David Adams (Argentina) Martín García	7–6^{(12–10)}, 6–4
Loss	1–2	Apr 2001	Houston, United States	Clay	(United States) Kevin Kim	(India) Mahesh Bhupathi (India) Leander Paes	6–7^{(4–7)}, 2–6
Loss	1–3	Sep 2001	Tashkent, Uzbekistan	Hard	(South Africa) Marius Barnard	(France) Julien Boutter (Slovakia) Dominik Hrbatý	4–6, 6–3, [11–13]
Win	2–3	Jul 2004	Newport, United States	Grass	(Australia) Jordan Kerr	(France) Grégory Carraz (France) Nicolas Mahut	6–3, 6–7^{(5–7)}, 6–3
Win	3–3	Jul 2004	Indianapolis, United States	Hard	(Australia) Jordan Kerr	(Zimbabwe) Wayne Black (Zimbabwe) Kevin Ullyett	6–7^{(7–9)}, 7–6^{(7–3)}, 6–3
Loss	3–4	Jan 2005	Delray Beach, United States	Hard	(Australia) Jordan Kerr	(Sweden) Simon Aspelin (Australia) Todd Perry	3–6, 3–6
Win	4–4	Jul 2005	Newport, United States	Grass	(Australia) Jordan Kerr	(United States) Graydon Oliver (United States) Travis Parrott	7–6^{(7–5)}, 7–6^{(7–5)}
Loss	4–5	Feb 2006	San Jose, United States	Hard (i)	(United States) Paul Goldstein	(Sweden) Jonas Björkman (United States) John McEnroe	6–7^{(2–7)}, 6–4, [7–10]
Win	5–5	May 2006	Pörtschach, Austria	Clay	(Australia) Paul Hanley	(Austria) Oliver Marach (Czech Republic) Cyril Suk	6–3, 4–6, [10–5]
Loss	5–6	Jul 2006	Indianapolis, United States	Hard	(United States) Paul Goldstein	(United States) Bobby Reynolds (United States) Andy Roddick	4–6, 4–6
Loss	6–6	Oct 2006	Tokyo, Japan	Hard	(United States) Paul Goldstein	(Australia) Ashley Fisher (United States) Tripp Phillips	2–6, 5–7
Win	7–6	Jul 2007	Newport, United States	Grass	(Australia) Jordan Kerr	(Australia) Nathan Healey (Russia) Igor Kunitsyn	6–3, 7–5
