= Indianapolis Tennis Championships =

Defunct tennis tournament
- Founded: 1987
- Abolished: 2009
- Editions: 22
- Location: Indianapolis, Indiana; United States
- Venue: Indianapolis Tennis Center
- Category: ATP Championship Series (1990–1997); ATP International Series Gold (1998–2002); ATP International Series (2003–2008); ATP World Tour 250 series (2009)
- Surface: Hard / outdoors
- Draw: 32S/16D

The Indianapolis Tennis Championships was an annual men's tennis tournament played in Indianapolis as part of the ATP Tour. Since its inaugural playing in 1987, the tournament was held for one week in July up until its final playing in 2009. Originally known as the U.S. Men's Claycourt Championships, the event was created after the Indianapolis Sports Center decided to resurface its 18 clay courts with Deco-Turf II, the same surface as the US Open. As a consequence, the U.S. Men's Clay Court Championships was moved from Indianapolis to Charleston, South Carolina. From 1992 to 2006 it was known as the RCA Championships.

The tournament's change in surface and name came with a change of date to be closer to the start of the US Open. The event gained the attention of the world's best players and became a premier warm-up stop for the US Open.

The tournament ended in 2009 and a new tournament in Atlanta replaced it in 2010.

== Past finals ==
=== Singles ===
Year	Champions	Runners-up	Score
1988	(Germany) Boris Becker	(United States) John McEnroe	6–4, 6–2
1989	(United States) John McEnroe	(United States) Jay Berger	6–4, 4–6, 6–4
1990	(Germany) Boris Becker	(Sweden) Peter Lundgren	6–3, 6–4
1991	(United States) Pete Sampras	(Germany) Boris Becker	7–6^{(7–2)}, 3–6, 6–3
1992	(United States) Pete Sampras	(United States) Jim Courier	6–4, 6–4
1993	(United States) Jim Courier	(Germany) Boris Becker	7–5, 6–3
1994	(South Africa) Wayne Ferreira	(France) Olivier Delaître	6–2, 6–1
1995	(Sweden) Thomas Enqvist	(Germany) Bernd Karbacher	6–4, 6–3
1996	(United States) Pete Sampras	(Croatia) Goran Ivanišević	7–6^{(7–3)}, 7–5
1997	(Sweden) Jonas Björkman	(Spain) Carlos Moyà	6–3, 7–6
1998	(Spain) Àlex Corretja	(United States) Andre Agassi	2–6, 6–2, 6–3
1999	(Ecuador) Nicolás Lapentti	(United States) Vincent Spadea	4–6, 6–4, 6–4
2000	(Brazil) Gustavo Kuerten	(Russia) Marat Safin	3–6, 7–6^{(7–2)}, 7–6^{(7–2)}
2001	(Australia) Patrick Rafter	(Brazil) Gustavo Kuerten	4–2 retired
2002	(United Kingdom) Greg Rusedski	(Spain) Félix Mantilla	6–7^{(6–8)}, 6–4, 6–4
2003	(United States) Andy Roddick	(Thailand) Paradorn Srichaphan	7–6^{(7–2)}, 6–4
2004	(United States) Andy Roddick	(Germany) Nicolas Kiefer	6–2, 6–3
2005	(United States) Robby Ginepri	(United States) Taylor Dent	4–6, 6–3, 3–0 retired
2006	(United States) James Blake	(United States) Andy Roddick	4–6, 6–4, 7–6^{(7–5)}
2007	(Russia) Dmitry Tursunov	(Canada) Frank Dancevic	6–4, 7–5
2008	(France) Gilles Simon	(Russia) Dmitry Tursunov	6–4, 6–4
2009	(United States) Robby Ginepri	(United States) Sam Querrey	6–2, 6–4
2010	succeeded by Atlanta Open		

=== Doubles ===
Year	Champions	Runners-up	Score
1988	(United States) Rick Leach (United States) Jim Pugh	(United States) Ken Flach (United States) Robert Seguso	4–6, 6–3, 6–4
1989	(South Africa) Pieter Aldrich (South Africa) Danie Visser	(Australia) Peter Doohan (Australia) Laurie Warder	7–6, 7–6
1990	(United States) Scott Davis (United States) David Pate	(Canada) Grant Connell (Canada) Glenn Michibata	4–6, 6–2, 6–2
1991	(United States) Ken Flach (United States) Robert Seguso	(United States) Kent Kinnear (United States) Sven Salumaa	7–6, 6–4
1992	(United States) Jim Grabb (United States) Richey Reneberg	(Canada) Grant Connell (United States) Glenn Michibata	4–6, 6–2, 7–6
1993	(United States) Scott Davis (United States) Todd Martin	(United States) Ken Flach (United States) Rick Leach	3–6, 6–3, 6–2
1994	(Australia) Todd Woodbridge (Australia) Mark Woodforde	(United States) Jim Grabb (United States) Richey Reneberg	6–4, 6–2
1995	(The Bahamas) Mark Knowles (Canada) Daniel Nestor	(United States) Scott Davis (United States) Todd Martin	6–4, 6–4
1996	(United States) Jim Grabb (United States) Richey Reneberg	(Czech Republic) Petr Korda (Czech Republic) Cyril Suk	7–6, 4–6, 6–4
1997	(Australia) Michael Tebbutt (Sweden) Mikael Tillström	(Sweden) Jonas Björkman (Sweden) Nicklas Kulti	6–3, 6–2
1998	(Czech Republic) Jiří Novák (Czech Republic) David Rikl	(The Bahamas) Mark Knowles (Canada) Daniel Nestor	6–2, 7–6
1999	(Netherlands) Paul Haarhuis (United States) Jared Palmer	(France) Olivier Delaître (India) Leander Paes	6–3, 6–4
2000	(Australia) Lleyton Hewitt (Australia) Sandon Stolle	(Sweden) Jonas Björkman (Belarus) Max Mirnyi	6–2, 3–6, 6–3
2001	(The Bahamas) Mark Knowles (United States) Brian MacPhie	(India) Mahesh Bhupathi (Canada) Sébastien Lareau	7–6^{(7–5)}, 5–7, 6–4
2002	(The Bahamas) Mark Knowles (Canada) Daniel Nestor	(India) Mahesh Bhupathi (Belarus) Max Mirnyi	7–6^{(7–4)}, 6–7^{(5–7)}, 6–4
2003	(Croatia) Mario Ančić (Israel) Andy Ram	(United States) Diego Ayala (United States) Robby Ginepri	2–6, 7–6^{(7–3)}, 7–5
2004	(Australia) Jordan Kerr (United States) Jim Thomas	(Zimbabwe) Wayne Black (Zimbabwe) Kevin Ullyett	6^{(7–9)}–7, 7–6^{(7–3)}, 6–3
2005	(Australia) Paul Hanley (United States) Graydon Oliver	(Sweden) Simon Aspelin (Australia) Todd Perry	6–2, 3–1 (retired)
2006	(United States) Bobby Reynolds (United States) Andy Roddick	(United States) Paul Goldstein (United States) Jim Thomas	6–4, 6–4
2007	(Argentina) Juan Martín del Potro (United States) Travis Parrott	(Russia) Teimuraz Gabashvili (Croatia) Ivo Karlović	3–6, 6–2, [10–6]
2008	(Australia) Ashley Fisher (United States) Tripp Phillips	(United States) Scott Lipsky (United States) David Martin	3–6, 6–3, [10–5]
2009	(Latvia) Ernests Gulbis (Russia) Dmitry Tursunov	(Australia) Ashley Fisher (Australia) Jordan Kerr	6–4, 3–6, [11–9]
2010	succeeded by Atlanta Open		
