= Paul Goldstein (tennis) =

American tennis player (born 1976)

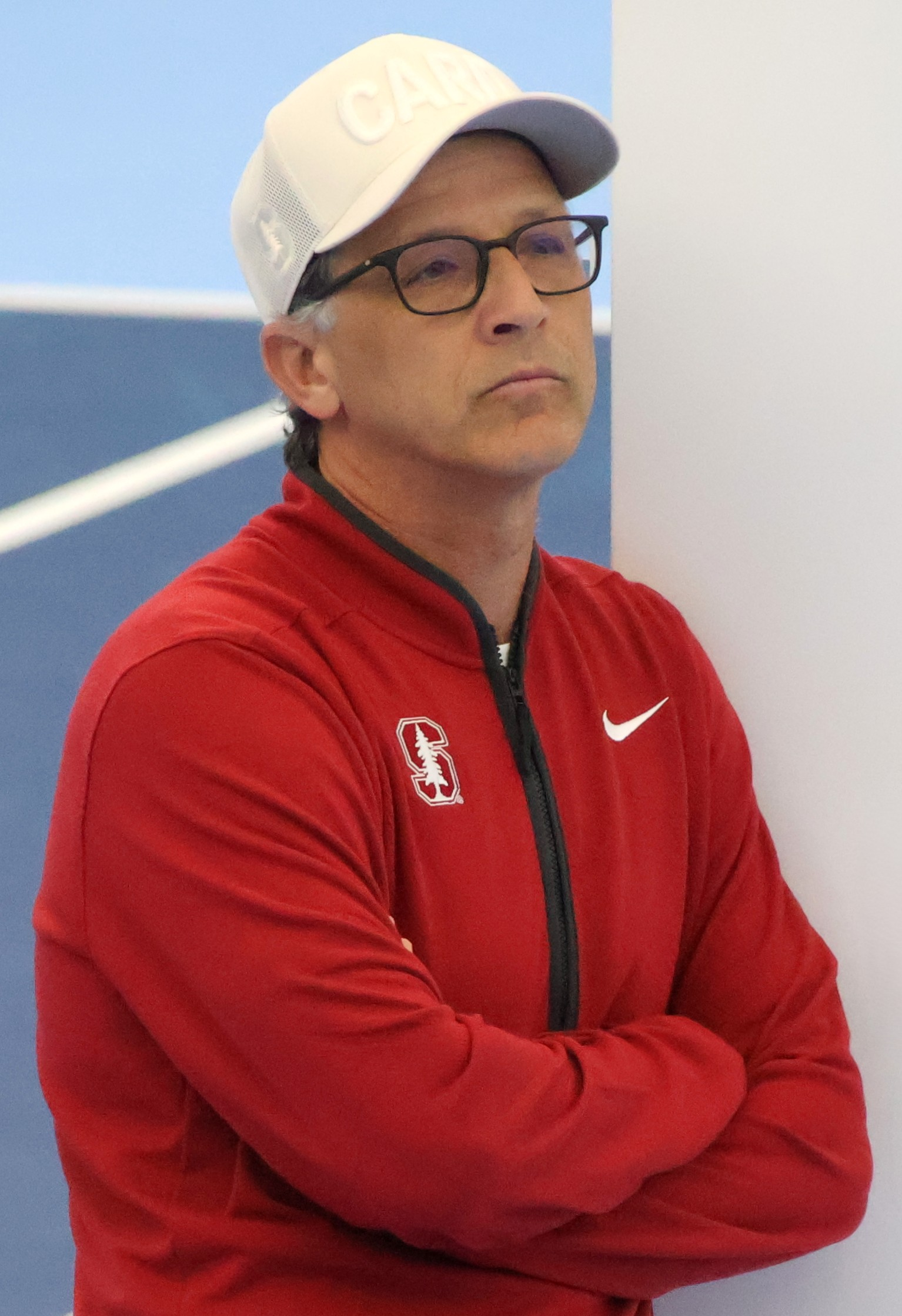
- Goldstein with Stanford in 2026
- Country (sports): United States
- Residence: San Francisco, California, United States
- Born: August 4, 1976 (age 50) Washington, D.C., United States
- Height: 5 ft 10 in (1.78 m)
- Turned pro: 1998
- Retired: 2008
- Plays: Right-handed (two-handed backhand)
- Prize money: $1,620,456

Singles
- Career record: 85–115
- Career titles: 0
- Highest ranking: No. 58 (24 April 2006)

Grand Slam singles results
- Australian Open: 3R (1999)
- French Open: 2R (2000)
- Wimbledon: 3R (1999, 2000)
- US Open: 2R (1998, 1999, 2004, 2006)

Doubles
- Career record: 56–88
- Career titles: 0
- Highest ranking: No. 40 (5 February 2007)

Grand Slam doubles results
- Australian Open: 1R (2000, 2001, 2005, 2007)
- French Open: 2R (1999)
- Wimbledon: 2R (2000)
- US Open: SF (2005)

Grand Slam mixed doubles results
- US Open: 1R (2001)
Medal record
Men's tennis
Representing the United States
Pan American Games
Gold medal – first place	1999 Winnipeg	Singles
Summer Universiade
Gold medal – first place	1995 Fukuoka	Doubles
- Last updated on: July 1, 2022.

Paul Herbert Goldstein (born August 4, 1976) is an American tennis coach and former professional player who is the head coach of the Stanford Cardinal men's tennis team.

As a junior, he won the USTA Boys' 16s National Championship in 1992, and the USTA Boys' 18s National Championships in both 1993 and 1994. He then played college tennis at Stanford University, from which he graduated after a career in which he was named an All-American each of the four years he played, and the team won the national championship each year. He won the gold medal in singles at the 1999 Pan American Games. He turned professional in 1998.

The right-hander reached career-high ATP Tour rankings of world No. 58 in singles in April 2006, and world No. 40 in doubles in February 2007. He announced his retirement from professional tennis in 2008. Since 2014, he has been the head coach of the Stanford Cardinal men's tennis team.

== Early life ==
Goldstein was born in Washington, D.C., and raised in Rockville, Maryland, and is Jewish. He is the son of Clark Goldstein, a former national table tennis champion. He started playing when he was nine.

He won the USTA Boys' 16s National Championship in 1992, and the USTA Boys' 18s National Championships in both 1993 and 1994 (in 1994, defeating Jan-Michael Gambill). He also won the 1994 doubles championship with Scott Humphries.

He is a 1994 graduate of Sidwell Friends School in Washington, D.C., where he was a four-time Washington Post First Team All Met selection (1991–1994).

== College career ==
Goldstein played college tennis at Stanford University and graduated in 1998 with a degree in human biology. He was an All-American each year, and the team won the national championship each year. In his senior year he was Pac-10 Player of the Year in 1998, after a 33–2 season in which he was team captain. In 2023, Goldstein was inducted into the Stanford Athletics Hall of Fame.

== Professional career ==
He had 26 USTA titles through November 2005.Paul Goldstein: Circuit Player of the Week

In January 1999 at the Australian Open he defeated world No. 8 Greg Rusedski. In June at Wimbledon he upset both world No. 33 Jan Siemerink, and No. 17 Félix Mantilla. In August he upset world No. 8 Àlex Corretja of Spain in Washington, D.C. He won the gold medal in singles at the 1999 Pan American Games defeating Cecil Mamiit.

In February 2000 he defeated world No. 17 Pat Rafter of Australia in Delray Beach, Florida.

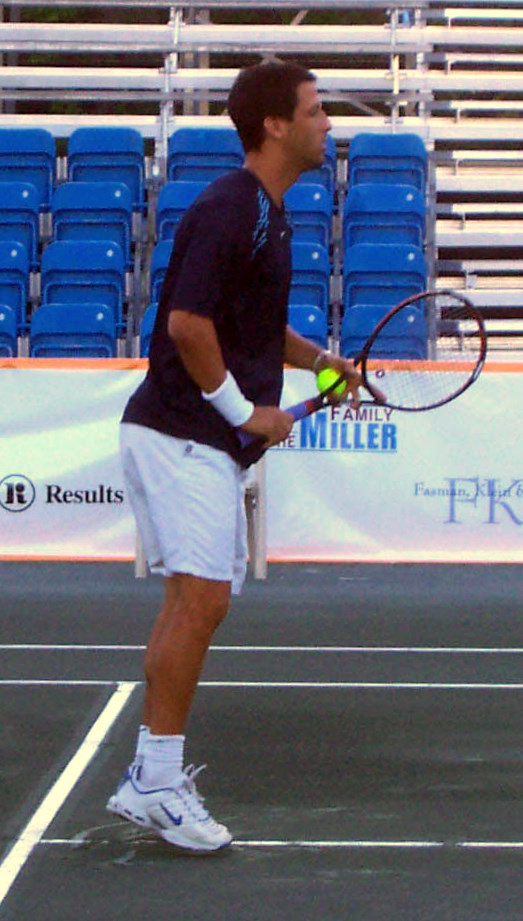
Goldstein in 2007

In the 2005 US Open, Goldstein and Jim Thomas upset defending champions and No. 1 seeds Mark Knowles and Daniel Nestor in the first round, as well as Simon Aspelin and Todd Perry in the QFs, before losing to eventual champions Bob Bryan and Mike Bryan in the SFs. In the 2006 US Open, Goldstein and Thomas again defeated Knowles and Nestor (this time in the 3rd round).

Goldstein and Jim Thomas lost in the doubles finals of the 2006 SAP Open to 47-year-old John McEnroe and Jonas Björkman. They also were doubles finalists in two other ATP tournaments in 2006 (Indianapolis, won by Andy Roddick and Bobby Reynolds, and Tokyo, won by Ashley Fisher and Tripp Phillips).

In February 2006 he beat world No. 18 Robby Ginepri in three sets, in Las Vegas, and in July he defeated world No. 13 Lleyton Hewitt in two sets in Los Angeles. In the January Australian Open, he beat future champion Novak Djokovic in the first round. Paul was easily defeated in the next round by Tommy Haas.

In January 2007 he defeated world No. 21 Dominik Hrbatý of Slovakia, in Adelaide, Australia. The next month he defeated world No. 45 Julien Benneteau in Las Vegas, 6–1, 6–0. Despite losing in the first round of singles at the Tunica Resorts Challenger in May, he and Donald Young won the doubles final, defeating Pablo Cuevas and Horacio Zeballos in three sets.

== Tennis exhibitions ==
Goldstein has participated in exhibition events for other tennis players and their charities, including Andy Roddick, Jim Thomas, and the Bryan brothers. On September 27, 2008, he participated in The Bryan Brothers' All-Star Tennis Smash in Thousand Oaks, California, initially playing doubles with Justin Gimblestob, and ending up playing singles with Andre Agassi (losing 7–5).

== Post-retirement ==
Goldstein officially retired in February 2008 and began working with a clean energy company in the San Francisco Bay area. In 2004 he married his college sweetheart and partner of nine years, Abbie; it was she who persuaded him to play on during the 2007 season. They live in Menlo Park, California, with their three children, Sadie, Margaret, and Charles.

In 2014, Goldstein became the head coach of the Stanford Cardinal men's tennis team.

== Halls of Fame ==
Goldstein was inducted into the ITA Collegiate Tennis Hall of Fame in 2013.

Goldstein was inducted into the North California Jewish Sports Hall of Fame in 2015.

== ATP career finals ==
=== Doubles: 5 (5 runner-ups) ===
Legend Grand Slam Tournaments (0–0) ATP World Tour Finals (0–0) ATP Masters 1000 Series (0–0) ATP 500 Series (0–1) ATP 250 Series (0–4)	Finals by surface Hard (0–5) Clay (0–0) Grass (0–0) Carpet (0–0)	Finals by setting Outdoors (0–2) Indoors (0–3)

Result	W–L	Date	Tournament	Tier	Surface	Partner	Opponents	Score
Loss	0–1	Nov 2000	Brighton, United Kingdom	International Series	Hard	(United States) Jim Thomas	(Australia) Michael Hill (United States) Jeff Tarango	3–6, 5–7
Loss	0–2	Feb 2003	San Jose, United States	International Series	Hard	(United States) Robert Kendrick	(South Korea) Lee Hyung-Taik (Belarus) Vladimir Voltchkov	5–7, 6–4, 3–6
Loss	0–3	Feb 2006	San Jose, United States	International Series	Hard	(United States) Jim Thomas	(Sweden) Jonas Björkman (United States) John McEnroe	6–7^{(2–7)}, 6–4, [7–10]
Loss	0–4	Jul 2006	Indianapolis, United States	International Series	Hard	(United States) Jim Thomas	(United States) Bobby Reynolds (United States) Andy Roddick	4–6, 4–6
Loss	0–5	Oct 2006	Tokyo, Japan	Championship Series	Hard	(United States) Jim Thomas	(Australia) Ashley Fisher (United States) Tripp Phillips	2–6, 5–7

== ATP Challenger and ITF Futures finals ==
=== Singles: 20 (13–7) ===
Legend ATP Challenger (12–6) ITF Futures (1–1)	Finals by surface Hard (12–7) Clay (1–0) Grass (0–0) Carpet (0–0)

Result	W–L	Date	Tournament	Tier	Surface	Opponent	Score
Win	1–0	Aug 1998	Lexington, United States	Challenger	Hard	(South Korea) Lee Hyung-Taik	6–1, 6–4
Loss	1–1	Oct 1998	San Diego, United States	Challenger	Hard	(Finland) Ville Liukko	5–7, 6–7
Win	2–1	Jan 2000	Waikoloa, United States	Challenger	Hard	(Brazil) André Sá	7–5, 6–2
Win	3–1	Aug 2001	Lexington, United States	Challenger	Hard	(United States) Jack Brasington	1–6, 6–2, 6–3
Win	4–1	Nov 2001	USA F27, Malibu	Futures	Hard	(Argentina) Matías Boeker	6–3, 6–0
Loss	4–2	Aug 2002	Lexington, United States	Challenger	Hard	(Australia) Scott Draper	6–4, 4–6, 4–6
Win	5–2	Nov 2002	Tyler, United States	Challenger	Hard	(United States) Mardy Fish	6–7^{(4–7)}, 6–4, 6–3
Loss	5–3	Apr 2003	USA F7, Pensacola	Futures	Hard	(Argentina) Nicolás Todero	6–7^{(2–7)}, 4–6
Win	6–3	Jun 2003	Tallahassee, United States	Challenger	Hard	(United States) Alex Kim	2–6, 6–2, 4–0 ret.
Loss	6–4	Nov 2003	Waco, United States	Challenger	Hard	(Ecuador) Giovanni Lapentti	4–6, 3–6
Win	7–4	Nov 2003	Austin, United States	Challenger	Hard	(United States) Robert Kendrick	6–3, 6–3
Win	8–4	Nov 2003	Champaign-Urbana, United States	Challenger	Hard	(United States) Brian Vahaly	6–3, 6–1
Win	9–4	Sep 2004	Covington, United States	Challenger	Hard	(Brazil) André Sá	6–2, 6–0
Win	10–4	Jan 2005	Waikoloa, United States	Challenger	Hard	(United States) Cecil Mamiit	6–2, 6–2
Loss	10–5	May 2005	Busan, South Korea	Challenger	Hard	(Thailand) Danai Udomchoke	6–7^{(6–8)}, 2–6
Loss	10–6	Jun 2005	Yuba City, United States	Challenger	Hard	(United States) Cecil Mamiit	4–6, 4–6
Win	11–6	Nov 2005	Boston, United States	Challenger	Hard	(Canada) Frank Dancevic	5–7, 7–5, 6–3
Win	12–6	Oct 2006	Sacramento, United States	Challenger	Hard	(United States) Rajeev Ram	7–6^{(7–5)}, 4–6, 7–5
Loss	12–7	Nov 2006	Busan, South Korea	Challenger	Hard	(Thailand) Danai Udomchoke	2–6, 0–6
Win	13–7	May 2007	Forest Hills, United States	Challenger	Clay	(Chile) Adrián García	walkover

=== Doubles: 20 (12–8) ===
Legend ATP Challenger (12–7) ITF Futures (0–1)	Finals by surface Hard (10–7) Clay (2–1) Grass (0–0) Carpet (0–0)

Result	W–L	Date	Tournament	Tier	Surface	Partner	Opponents	Score
Loss	0–1	Nov 1997	Las Vegas, United States	Challenger	Hard	(United States) Jim Thomas	(United States) David Di Lucia (United States) Michael Sell	4–6, 4–6
Loss	0–2	Aug 1998	Lexington, United States	Challenger	Hard	(United States) Jim Thomas	(Australia) Ben Ellwood (Australia) Lleyton Hewitt	7–5, 3–6, 2–6
Win	1–2	Oct 1998	San Diego, United States	Challenger	Hard	(United States) Adam Peterson	(Australia) Michael Hill (United States) Scott Humphries	6–2, 7–5
Win	2–2	Feb 1999	Laguna Hills, United States	Challenger	Hard	(United States) Brian Macphie	(Argentina) Pablo Albano (Argentina) Daniel Orsanic	3–6, 6–4, 7–5
Loss	2–3	Sep 1999	Austin, United States	Challenger	Hard	(United States) Adam Peterson	(South Africa) Marcos Ondruska (South Africa) Wesley Whitehouse	5–7, 6–4, 2–6
Win	3–3	Dec 1999	Urbana, United States	Challenger	Hard	(United States) Jim Thomas	(United States) Bob Bryan (United States) Mike Bryan	6–7, 7–6, 7–6
Win	4–3	Jan 2001	Waikoloa, United States	Challenger	Hard	(United States) Jim Thomas	(United States) Mike Bryan (Thailand) Paradorn Srichaphan	3–6, 6–4, 6–3
Win	5–3	Apr 2001	Paget, Bermuda	Challenger	Clay	(United States) Andy Roddick	(Japan) Thomas Shimada (South Africa) Grant Stafford	4–6, 6–3, 6–4
Loss	5–4	Apr 2002	Calabasas, United States	Challenger	Hard	(United States) Justin Gimelstob	(South Africa) Paul Rosner (United States) Glenn Weiner	2–6, 6–4, 6–7^{(4–7)}
Win	6–4	Aug 2002	Binghamton, United States	Challenger	Hard	(United States) Scott Humphries	(Israel) Amir Hadad (United States) Robert Kendrick	4–6, 7–6^{(7–1)}, 7–5
Loss	6–5	Apr 2003	USA F7, Pensacola	Futures	Hard	(United States) Kiantki Thomas	(United States) Huntley Montgomery (United States) Tripp Phillips	7–6^{(8–6)}, 4–6, 5–7
Loss	6–6	May 2003	Birmingham, United States	Challenger	Clay	(United States) Robert Kendrick	(Brazil) Josh Goffi (United States) Travis Parrott	4–6, 6–2, 2–6
Loss	6–7	Jun 2003	Atlantic City, United States	Challenger	Hard	(United States) Brandon Coupe	(United States) Tripp Phillips (United States) Ryan Sachire	5–7, 3–6
Win	7–7	Sep 2003	San Antonio, United States	Challenger	Hard	(United States) Jeff Morrison	(Czech Republic) Tomáš Cakl (South Africa) Louis Vosloo	6–3, 6–2
Loss	7–8	Oct 2003	Fresno, United States	Challenger	Hard	(United States) Jeff Morrison	(United States) Travis Parrott (United States) Diego Ayala	5–7, 6–4, 3–6
Win	8–8	Sep 2004	Covington, United States	Challenger	Hard	(United States) K.J. Hippensteel	(United States) Hugo Armando (Ecuador) Nicolás Lapentti	6–3, 6–3
Win	9–8	Oct 2004	College Station, United States	Challenger	Hard	(United States) Brian Vahaly	(Brazil) André Sá (Brazil) Bruno Soares	7–5, 2–6, 6–4
Win	10–8	May 2005	Busan, South Korea	Challenger	Hard	(United States) Rajeev Ram	(United States) Justin Gimelstob (South Africa) Wesley Moodie	walkover
Win	11–8	Oct 2006	Sacramento, United States	Challenger	Hard	(United States) Jeff Morrison	(United States) Amer Delić (United States) Brian Wilson	6–1, 6–3
Win	12–8	May 2007	Tunica Resorts, United States	Challenger	Clay	(United States) Donald Young	(Uruguay) Pablo Cuevas (Argentina) Horacio Zeballos	4–6, 6–3, [10–4]

== Junior Grand Slam finals ==
=== Doubles: 1 (1 runner-up) ===
Result	Year	Tournament	Surface	Partner	Opponents	Score
Loss	1994	US Open	Hard	(United States) Scott Humphries	(Australia) Ben Ellwood (Ecuador) Nicolás Lapentti	0–6, 2–6

== Performance timelines ==
Key
W	F	SF	QF	#R	RR	Q#	DNQ	A	NH

(W) winner; (F) finalist; (SF) semifinalist; (QF) quarterfinalist; (#R) rounds 4, 3, 2, 1; (RR) round-robin stage; (Q#) qualification round; (DNQ) did not qualify; (A) absent; (NH) not held; (SR) strike rate (events won / competed); (W–L) win–loss record.

=== Singles ===
Tournament	1993	1994	1995	1996	1997	1998	1999	2000	2001	2002	2003	2004	2005	2006	2007	SR	W–L	Win%
Grand Slam tournaments
Australian Open	A	Q1	A	A	A	A	3R	1R	2R	Q3	Q1	Q1	Q3	2R	1R	0 / 5	4–5	44%
French Open	A	A	A	A	A	A	Q1	2R	1R	A	Q1	Q1	A	1R	A	0 / 3	1–3	25%
Wimbledon	A	A	A	A	A	A	3R	3R	A	A	Q1	Q2	1R	1R	A	0 / 4	4–4	50%
US Open	1R	1R	A	Q1	Q3	2R	2R	1R	Q2	Q2	Q2	2R	Q2	2R	1R	0 / 8	4–8	33%
Win–loss	0–1	0–1	0–0	0–0	0–0	1–1	5–3	3–4	1–2	0–0	0–0	1–1	0–1	2–4	0–2	0 / 20	13–20	39%
ATP World Tour Masters 1000
Indian Wells	A	A	A	A	A	A	Q2	1R	Q1	Q2	A	A	2R	2R	2R	0 / 4	3–4	43%
Miami	A	Q1	A	A	A	A	1R	2R	1R	A	A	A	Q1	2R	2R	0 / 5	3–5	38%
Canada	A	A	A	A	A	A	A	A	A	A	A	A	A	1R	Q2	0 / 1	0–1	0%
Cincinnati	A	A	A	A	A	A	2R	A	Q1	A	A	Q1	A	1R	A	0 / 2	1–2	33%
Win–loss	0–0	0–0	0–0	0–0	0–0	0–0	1–2	1–2	0–1	0–0	0–0	0–0	1–1	2–4	2–2	0 / 12	7–12	37%

=== Doubles ===
Tournament	1994	1995	1996	1997	1998	1999	2000	2001	2002	2003	2004	2005	2006	2007	SR	W–L	Win%
Grand Slam tournaments
Australian Open	A	A	A	A	A	A	1R	1R	A	A	A	1R	A	1R	0 / 4	0–4	0%
French Open	A	A	A	A	A	2R	1R	1R	A	A	A	A	A	A	0 / 3	1–3	25%
Wimbledon	A	A	A	A	A	1R	2R	A	A	A	Q1	Q2	1R	A	0 / 3	1–3	25%
US Open	1R	A	Q2	A	1R	1R	2R	1R	A	A	A	SF	QF	1R	0 / 8	8–8	50%
Win–loss	0–1	0–0	0–0	0–0	0–1	1–3	2–4	0–3	0–0	0–0	0–0	4–2	3–2	0–2	0 / 18	10–18	36%
ATP World Tour Masters 1000
Indian Wells	A	A	A	A	A	1R	QF	1R	A	A	A	A	2R	A	0 / 4	3–4	43%
Miami	A	A	A	A	A	1R	2R	1R	A	A	A	A	A	2R	0 / 4	2–4	33%
Cincinnati	A	A	A	A	A	Q2	A	A	A	A	A	A	2R	A	0 / 1	1–1	50%
Win–loss	0–0	0–0	0–0	0–0	0–0	0–2	3–2	0–2	0–0	0–0	0–0	0–0	2–2	1–1	0 / 9	6–9	40%

== See also ==
- List of select Jewish tennis players
