= 1996 RCA Championships =

Tennis tournament

- Date: August 12–18
- Edition: 9th
- Category: Championship Series
- Draw: 56S / 28D
- Prize money: $915,000
- Surface: Hard / outdoors
- Location: Indianapolis, Indiana, U.S.
- Venue: Indianapolis Tennis Center

Champions

Singles
- (United States) Pete Sampras

Doubles
- (United States) Jim Grabb / (United States) Richey Reneberg
← 1995 ·	Indianapolis Tennis Championships	· 1997 →

The 1996 RCA Championships was a men's tennis tournament played on outdoor hard courts at the Indianapolis Tennis Center in Indianapolis, Indiana in the United States and was part of the Championship Series of the 1996 ATP Tour. The tournament ran from August 12 through August 18, 1996.

== Finals ==
=== Singles ===
(United States) Pete Sampras defeated (Croatia) Goran Ivanišević 7–6^{(7–3)}, 7–5

- It was Sampras' 5th title of the year and the 43rd of his career.

=== Doubles ===
(United States) Jim Grabb / (United States) Richey Reneberg defeated (Czech Republic) Petr Korda / (Czech Republic) Cyril Suk 7–6, 4–6, 6–4

- It was Grabb's 1st title of the year and the 23rd of his career. It was Reneberg's 2nd title of the year and the 18th of his career.
