= 1999 RCA Championships =

- Date: August 16–22
- Edition: 12th
- Category: Championship Series
- Draw: 56S / 28D
- Prize money: $745,000
- Surface: Hard / outdoor
- Location: Indianapolis, Indiana, U.S.
- Venue: Indianapolis Tennis Center

Champions

Singles
- (Ecuador) Nicolás Lapentti

Doubles
- (Netherlands) Paul Haarhuis / (United States) Jared Palmer
← 1998 ·	Indianapolis Tennis Championships	· 2000 →

The 1999 RCA Championships was a men's tennis tournament played on outdoor hard courts. It was the 12th edition of the event known that year as the RCA Championships, and was part of the Championship Series of the 1999 ATP Tour. It took place at the Indianapolis Tennis Center in Indianapolis, Indiana, United States from August 16 through August 22, 1999. Eleventh-seeded Nicolás Lapentti won the singles title.

== Finals ==
=== Singles ===
(Ecuador) Nicolás Lapentti defeated (United States) Vince Spadea 4–6, 6–4, 6–4

- It was Lapentti's 1st singles title of the year and the 2nd of his career.

=== Doubles ===
(Netherlands) Paul Haarhuis / (United States) Jared Palmer defeated (France) Olivier Delaître / (India) Leander Paes 6–3, 6–4
