= 1997 RCA Championships – Singles =

Singles
- 1997 RCA Championships

Final
- Champion: (Sweden) Jonas Björkman
- Runner-up: (Spain) Carlos Moyá
- Score: 6–3, 7–6^{(7–3)}

Events
Singles	Doubles
← 1996 ·	RCA Championships	· 1998 →

Pete Sampras was the defending champion, but lost in the third round to Magnus Larsson.

Jonas Björkman won the title, defeating Carlos Moyá in the final 6–3, 7–6^{(7–3)}.

== Seeds ==
The top eight seeds received a bye into the second round.

1. (United States) Pete Sampras (third round)
2. (Croatia) Goran Ivanišević (second round)
3. (Spain) Àlex Corretja (third round)
4. (Sweden) Thomas Enqvist (third round)
5. (Spain) Carlos Moyá (final)
6. (Chile) Marcelo Ríos (third round)
7. (Australia) Todd Woodbridge (third round)
8. (France) Cédric Pioline (second round)
9. (Sweden) Jonas Björkman (champion)
10. (South Africa) Wayne Ferreira (semifinals)
11. (Spain) Alberto Berasategui (first round)
12. (United States) Chris Woodruff (second round)
13. (Czech Republic) Bohdan Ulihrach (second round)
14. (United States) Andre Agassi (quarterfinals)
15. (Sweden) Thomas Johansson (first round)
16. (Sweden) Magnus Larsson (quarterfinals)

== Draw ==
=== Key ===
- Q = Qualifier
- WC = Wild card
- LL = Lucky loser
- Alt = Alternate
- SE = Special exempt
- PR = Protected ranking
- ITF = ITF entry
- JE = Junior exempt
- w/o = Walkover
- r = Retired
- d = Defaulted
- SR = Special ranking

=== Finals ===
Quarterfinals
16	(Sweden) Magnus Larsson	6	3	6^{10}
10	(South Africa) Wayne Ferreira	3	6	7^{12}
(Czech Republic) Jiří Novák	3	5
5	(Spain) Carlos Moyá	6	7
(Australia) Mark Woodforde	6	5	6
14	(United States) Andre Agassi	3	7	3
9	(Sweden) Jonas Björkman	5	6	7
Q	(United States) Tommy Ho	7	4	5

Semifinals
10	(South Africa) Wayne Ferreira	4	2
5	(Spain) Carlos Moyá	6	6
(Australia) Mark Woodforde	0	2
9	(Sweden) Jonas Björkman	6	6

Final
5	(Spain) Carlos Moyá	3	6^{3}
9	(Sweden) Jonas Björkman	6	7^{7}

=== Top half ===
==== Section 1 ====
First round
(United States) J Stark	6^{4}	3
Q	(Australia) J Eagle	7^{7}	6
(France) F Santoro	6	6
(Australia) S Draper	3	4
(Canada) D Nestor	4	1
16	(Sweden) M Larsson	6	6
10	(South Africa) W Ferreira	6	6
Q	(Australia) M Tebbutt	4	3
WC	(United States) K Kinnear	6^{7}	7^{8}	0^{r}
(Israel) E Ran	7^{9}	6^{6}	3
(South Africa) G Stafford	6	7
(Germany) A Rădulescu	4	5

Second round
1	(United States) P Sampras	6	7
Q	(Australia) J Eagle	3	5
(France) F Santoro	3	2
16	(Sweden) M Larsson	6	6
10	(South Africa) W Ferreira	6	6
(Israel) E Ran	2	3
(South Africa) G Stafford	2	6	6
8	(France) C Pioline	6	4	4

Third round
1	(United States) P Sampras	6^{6}	6	6^{5}
16	(Sweden) M Larsson	7^{8}	4	7^{7}
10	(South Africa) W Ferreira	6	7^{7}
(South Africa) G Stafford	4	6^{4}

Quarterfinals
16	(Sweden) M Larsson	6	3	6^{10}
10	(South Africa) W Ferreira	3	6	7^{12}

==== Section 2 ====
First round
Q	(Israel) R Weidenfeld	6	4	3
(South Africa) N Godwin	3	6	6
(Sweden) M Tillström	4	7^{7}	1
(Czech Republic) J Novák	6	6^{1}	6
(United States) D Flach	4	5
13	(Czech Republic) B Ulihrach	6	7
11	(Spain) A Berasategui	7	6^{5}	1
(Australia) R Fromberg	5	7^{7}	6
WC	(United States) M Merklein	3	6	6
(Germany) T Haas	6	1	3
(Germany) B Karbacher	4	6	2
WC	(United States) S Campbell	6	4	6

Second round
4	(Sweden) T Enqvist	6	6
(South Africa) N Godwin	3	0
(Czech Republic) J Novák	6	6
13	(Czech Republic) B Ulihrach	2	2
(Australia) R Fromberg	6	7^{7}
WC	(United States) M Merklein	3	6^{1}
WC	(United States) S Campbell	6^{5}	7	6^{2}
5	(Spain) C Moyá	7^{7}	5	7^{7}

Third round
4	(Sweden) T Enqvist	5	6	3
(Czech Republic) J Novák	7	3	6
(Australia) R Fromberg	2	4
5	(Spain) C Moyá	6	6

Quarterfinals
(Czech Republic) J Novák	3	5
5	(Spain) C Moyá	6	7

=== Bottom half ===
==== Section 3 ====
First round
Q	(United States) M Bryan	4	7	2
(France) T Champion	6	5	6
Q	(Belgium) J Van Herck	1	2
(Australia) M Woodforde	6	6
(United States) J Gimelstob	6	4	1
12	(United States) C Woodruff	3	6	6
14	(United States) A Agassi	6	4	6
(Italy) D Sanguinetti	2	6	4
(France) O Delaître	6	6
(Belgium) D Norman	4	2
(United States) R Reneberg	2	4
(France) A Boetsch	6	6

Second round
6	(Chile) M Ríos	3	6	6
(France) T Champion	6	2	3
(Australia) M Woodforde	6	6
12	(United States) C Woodruff	3	3
14	(United States) A Agassi	7^{7}	6
(France) O Delaître	6^{3}	1
(France) A Boetsch	2	7^{7}	2
3	(Spain) À Corretja	6	6^{5}	6

Third round
6	(Chile) M Ríos	6^{6}	4
(Australia) M Woodforde	7^{8}	6
14	(United States) A Agassi	7	6
3	(Spain) À Corretja	5	1

Quarterfinals
(Australia) M Woodforde	6	5	6
14	(United States) A Agassi	3	7	3

==== Section 4 ====
First round
(Czech Republic) M Damm	6	6
(France) J Golmard	1	1
(France) L Roux	6	6
(Romania) R Sabău	1	2
WC	(Australia) L Smith	2	6^{4}
9	(Sweden) J Björkman	6	7^{7}
15	(Sweden) T Johansson	7^{8}	5	4
WC	(United States) G Weiner	6^{6}	7	6
Q	(United States) T Ho	6	6
Q	(United States) S Bryan	3	3
(Australia) J Stoltenberg	6	7^{7}
(South Africa) M Ondruska	2	6^{4}

Second round
7	(Australia) T Woodbridge	6^{6}	7	7
(Czech Republic) M Damm	7^{8}	5	5
(France) L Roux	3	3
9	(Sweden) J Björkman	6	6
WC	(United States) G Weiner	6	6^{2}	3
Q	(United States) T Ho	3	7^{7}	6
(Australia) J Stoltenberg	6^{5}	7	6
2	(Croatia) G Ivanišević	7^{7}	5	4

Third round
7	(Australia) T Woodbridge	2	5
9	(Sweden) J Björkman	6	7
Q	(United States) T Ho	6	6
(Australia) J Stoltenberg	4	3

Quarterfinals
9	(Sweden) J Björkman	5	6	7
Q	(United States) T Ho	7	4	5
