= 1998 RCA Championships – Doubles =

Doubles
- 1998 RCA Championships

Final
- Champions: (Czech Republic) Jiří Novák (Czech Republic) David Rikl
- Runners-up: (The Bahamas) Mark Knowles (Canada) Daniel Nestor
- Score: 6–2, 7–6

Events
Singles	Doubles
← 1997 ·	Indianapolis Tennis Championships	· 1999 →

The 1998 RCA Championships was a tennis tournament played on outdoor hard courts. It was the 11th edition of the event known that year as the RCA Championships, and was part of the Championship Series of the 1998 ATP Tour. It was the 11th edition of the tournament and took place at the Indianapolis Tennis Center in Indianapolis, Indiana, United States.

== Seeds ==
Champion seeds are indicated in bold text while text in italics indicates the round in which those seeds were eliminated.

1. (United States) Patrick Galbraith / (Netherlands) Paul Haarhuis (semifinals)
2. (South Africa) Ellis Ferreira / (United States) Rick Leach (second round)
3. Unknown (withdrew)
4. (United States) Donald Johnson / (United States) Francisco Montana (second round)
5. (The Bahamas) Mark Knowles / (Canada) Daniel Nestor (final)
6. (Australia) Joshua Eagle / (Australia) Andrew Florent (first round)
7. (Sweden) Jonas Björkman / (South Africa) Wayne Ferreira (quarterfinals)
8. (South Africa) David Adams / (Zimbabwe) Wayne Black (second round)

== Draw ==
=== Key ===
- Q = Qualifier
- WC = Wild card
- LL = Lucky loser
- Alt = Alternate
- SE = Special exempt
- PR = Protected ranking
- ITF = ITF entry
- JE = Junior exempt
- w/o = Walkover
- r = Retired
- d = Defaulted
- SR = Special ranking

=== Finals ===
Semifinals
1	(United States) Patrick Galbraith (Netherlands) Paul Haarhuis	3	4
5	(The Bahamas) **Mark Knowles** **(Canada) Daniel Nestor**	**6**	**6**
(Czech Republic) **Jiří Novák** **(Czech Republic) David Rikl**	**7**	**7**
(South Africa) Brent Haygarth (South Africa) Marcos Ondruska	6	6

Final
5	(The Bahamas) Mark Knowles (Canada) Daniel Nestor	2	6
(Czech Republic) **Jiří Novák** **(Czech Republic) David Rikl**	**6**	**7**

=== Top half ===
First round
(United Kingdom) **N Broad** **(South Africa) P Norval**	**6**	5	**6**
(Australia) S Stolle (Czech Republic) C Suk	3	**7**	4
(Australia) **D Macpherson** **(United States) B MacPhie**	**7**	**7**
(United States) L Jensen (United States) M Jensen	6	5
8	(South Africa) **D Adams** **(Zimbabwe) W Black**	**6**	**6**
(Sweden) N Kulti (Sweden) M Tillström	2	2
(South Africa) **J-L de Jager** **(South Africa) R Koenig**	**7**	**6**
(United States) D Flach (Mexico) D Roditi	6	3
(South Africa) **C Haggard** **(United States) J Waite**	**6**	**6**
(United States) T Martin (United States) R Reneberg	4	3
5	(The Bahamas) **M Knowles** **(Canada) D Nestor**	**6**	**7**
(United States) B Bryan (United States) M Bryan	3	5

Second round
1	(United States) **P Galbraith** **(Netherlands) P Haarhuis**	5	**6**	**6**
(United Kingdom) N Broad (South Africa) P Norval	**7**	4	2
(Australia) **D Macpherson** **(United States) B MacPhie**	**6**	**6**
8	(South Africa) D Adams (Zimbabwe) W Black	2	4
(Czech Republic) **M Damm** **(United States) J Grabb**	**6**	**7**
(South Africa) J-L de Jager (South Africa) R Koenig	2	6
(South Africa) C Haggard (United States) J Waite	**6**	3	6
5	(The Bahamas) **M Knowles** **(Canada) D Nestor**	3	**6**	**7**

Quarterfinals
1	(United States) **P Galbraith** **(Netherlands) P Haarhuis**	**7**	**6**
(Australia) D Macpherson (United States) B MacPhie	6	4
(Czech Republic) M Damm (United States) J Grabb	**7**	4	4
5	(The Bahamas) **M Knowles** **(Canada) D Nestor**	6	**6**	**6**

Semifinals
1	(United States) P Galbraith (Netherlands) P Haarhuis	3	4
5	(The Bahamas) **M Knowles** **(Canada) D Nestor**	**6**	**6**

=== Bottom half ===
First round
(Czech Republic) **J Novák** **(Czech Republic) D Rikl**	**7**	**7**
6	(Australia) J Eagle (Australia) A Florent	5	5
(United States) **K Kinnear** **(United States) D Wheaton**	**6**	6	**6**
(The Bahamas) M Merklein (United States) V Spadea	4	**7**	1
(South Africa) **G Stafford** **(Zimbabwe) K Ullyett**	**6**	**7**
(Finland) T Ketola (North Macedonia) A Kitinov	2	6
7	(Sweden) **J Björkman** **(South Africa) W Ferreira**	4	**6**	**6**
(United States) S Davis (United States) D Pate	**6**	3	2
(United States) **B Coupe** **(United States) D Randall**	**6**	**7**
(United States) P Goldstein (United States) J Thomas	4	6
(South Africa) **B Haygarth** **(South Africa) M Ondruska**	**6**	**7**
(Australia) A Kratzmann (Australia) M Tebbutt	1	6

Second round
(Czech Republic) **J Novák** **(Czech Republic) D Rikl**	5	**6**	**7**
(United States) K Kinnear (United States) D Wheaton	**7**	4	6
(South Africa) **G Stafford** **(Zimbabwe) K Ullyett**	**6**	**6**
4	(United States) D Johnson (United States) F Montana	2	4
7	(Sweden) **J Björkman** **(South Africa) W Ferreira**	**6**	6	**7**
(United States) B Coupe (United States) D Randall	2	**7**	6
(South Africa) **B Haygarth** **(South Africa) M Ondruska**	3	**7**	**7**
2	(South Africa) E Ferreira (United States) R Leach	**6**	6	5

Quarterfinals
(Czech Republic) **J Novák** **(Czech Republic) D Rikl**	**7**	4	**6**
(South Africa) G Stafford (Zimbabwe) K Ullyett	5	**6**	1
7	(Sweden) J Björkman (South Africa) W Ferreira	3	3
(South Africa) **B Haygarth** **(South Africa) M Ondruska**	**6**	**6**

Semifinals
(Czech Republic) **J Novák** **(Czech Republic) D Rikl**	**7**	**7**
(South Africa) B Haygarth (South Africa) M Ondruska	6	6
