= 1998 RCA Championships =

- Date: August 17–23
- Edition: 11th
- Category: Championship Series
- Draw: 64S / 32D
- Prize money: $915,000
- Surface: Hard / outdoor
- Location: Indianapolis, Indiana, U.S.
- Venue: Indianapolis Tennis Center

Champions

Singles
- (Spain) Àlex Corretja

Doubles
- (Czech Republic) Jiří Novák / (Czech Republic) David Rikl
← 1997 ·	Indianapolis Tennis Championships	· 1999 →

The 1998 RCA Championships was a tennis tournament played on outdoor hard courts. It was the 11th edition of the event known that year as the RCA Championships, and was part of the Championship Series of the 1998 ATP Tour. It was the 11th edition of the tournament and took place at the Indianapolis Tennis Center in Indianapolis, Indiana, United States. Àlex Corretja won the singles event and Jiří Novák / David Rikl won the doubles title.

== Finals ==
=== Singles ===
(Spain) Àlex Corretja defeated (United States) Andre Agassi 2–6, 6–2, 6–3

- It was Corretja's third title of the year, and his sixth overall.

=== Doubles ===
(Czech Republic) Jiří Novák / (Czech Republic) David Rikl defeated (The Bahamas) Mark Knowles / (Canada) Daniel Nestor 6–2, 7–6
