= 2001 RCA Championships =

- Date: August 13–19
- Edition: 14th
- Category: International Series Gold
- Draw: 56S / 28D
- Prize money: $700,000
- Surface: Hard / outdoor
- Location: Indianapolis, IN, US
- Venue: Indianapolis Tennis Center

Champions

Singles
- (Australia) Patrick Rafter

Doubles
- (The Bahamas) Mark Knowles / (United States) Brian MacPhie
← 2000 ·	Indianapolis Tennis Championships	· 2002 →

The 2001 RCA Championships was a men's tennis tournament played on outdoor hard courts at the Indianapolis Tennis Center in Indianapolis, Indiana in the United States and was part of the International Series Gold of the 2001 ATP Tour. It was the 14th edition of the tournament and ran from August 13 through August 19, 2001.

== Finals ==
=== Singles ===
(Australia) Patrick Rafter defeated (Brazil) Gustavo Kuerten 4–2 (Kuerten retired)

- It was Rafter's only singles title of the year and the 11th and last of his career.

=== Doubles ===
(The Bahamas) Mark Knowles / (United States) Brian MacPhie defeated (India) Mahesh Bhupathi / (Canada) Sébastien Lareau 7–6^{(7–5)}, 5–7, 6–4

- It was Knowles' 3rd title of the year and the 17th of his career. It was MacPhie's 2nd title of the year and the 4th of his career.
