= 1997 RCA Championships – Doubles =

Doubles
- 1997 RCA Championships

Final
- Champions: (Australia) Michael Tebbutt (Sweden) Mikael Tillström
- Runners-up: (Sweden) Jonas Björkman (Sweden) Nicklas Kulti
- Score: 6–3, 6–2

Events
Singles	Doubles
← 1996 ·	Indianapolis Tennis Championships	· 1998 →

Jim Grabb and Richey Reneberg were the defending champions, but Grabb did not compete this year. Reneberg teamed up with Chris Woodruff and lost in the first round to Michael Tebbutt and Mikael Tillström.

Tebbutt and Tillström won the title by defeating Jonas Björkman and Nicklas Kulti 6–3, 6–2 in the final.

== Seeds ==
The first four seeds received a bye into the second round.

1. (Australia) Todd Woodbridge / (Australia) Mark Woodforde (semifinals)
2. (Canada) Daniel Nestor / (Czech Republic) Cyril Suk (second round)
3. (United States) Rick Leach / (United States) Jonathan Stark (second round)
4. (Sweden) Jonas Björkman / (Sweden) Nicklas Kulti (final)
5. (United Kingdom) Neil Broad / (South Africa) Piet Norval (quarterfinals)
6. (Czech Republic) Martin Damm / (Czech Republic) Pavel Vízner (first round)
7. (Canada) Grant Connell / (United States) Patrick Galbraith (semifinals)
8. (United States) Donald Johnson / (United States) Francisco Montana (quarterfinals)

== Draw ==
=== Key ===
- Q = Qualifier
- WC = Wild card
- LL = Lucky loser
- Alt = Alternate
- SE = Special exempt
- PR = Protected ranking
- ITF = ITF entry
- JE = Junior exempt
- w/o = Walkover
- r = Retired
- d = Defaulted
- SR = Special ranking

=== Finals ===
Semifinals
1	(Australia) Todd Woodbridge (Australia) Mark Woodforde	6	4
Q	(Australia) Michael Tebbutt (Sweden) Mikael Tillström	7	6
4	(Sweden) Jonas Björkman (Sweden) Nicklas Kulti	6	6
7	(Canada) Grant Connell (United States) Patrick Galbraith	4	2

Final
Q	(Australia) Michael Tebbutt (Sweden) Mikael Tillström	6	6
4	(Sweden) Jonas Björkman (Sweden) Nicklas Kulti	3	2

=== Top half ===
First round
(South Africa) M Ondruska (South Africa) G Stafford	6	6
WC	(Netherlands) S Groen (Chile) M Ríos	2	3
(Argentina) P Albano (Spain) À Corretja	3	1
(Australia) J Eagle (Australia) A Florent	6	6
WC	(Germany) T Haas (Canada) J Robichaud	2	5
8	(United States) D Johnson (United States) F Montana	6	7
Q	(Australia) M Tebbutt (Sweden) M Tilsltröm	6	4	7
(United States) R Reneberg (United States) C Woodruff	4	6	6
(United States) K Kinnear (Hungary) G Köves	3	2
(France) O Delaître (France) F Santoro	6	6
(South Africa) B Haygarth (United States) G Van Emburgh	3	5
5	(United Kingdom) N Broad (South Africa) P Norval	6	7

Second round
1	(Australia) T Woodbridge (Australia) M Woodforde	6	7
(South Africa) M Ondruska (South Africa) G Stafford	2	6
(Australia) J Eagle (Australia) A Florent
8	(United States) D Johnson (United States) F Montana	w	/	o
3	(United States) R Leach (United States) J Stark	6	3	3
Q	(Australia) M Tebbutt (Sweden) M Tilsltröm	4	6	6
(France) O Delaître (France) F Santoro
5	(United Kingdom) N Broad (South Africa) P Norval	w	/	o

Quarterfinals
1	(Australia) T Woodbridge (Australia) M Woodforde	4	6	7
8	(United States) D Johnson (United States) F Montana	6	3	5
Q	(Australia) M Tebbutt (Sweden) M Tilsltröm	2	7	6
5	(United Kingdom) N Broad (South Africa) P Norval	6	5	3

Semifinals
1	(Australia) T Woodbridge (Australia) M Woodforde	6	4
Q	(Australia) M Tebbutt (Sweden) M Tilsltröm	7	6

=== Bottom half ===
First round
6	(Czech Republic) M Damm (Czech Republic) P Vízner	6	3	3
(United States) J Gimelstob (Sweden) P Nyborg	3	6	6
(Croatia) G Ivanišević (North Macedonia) A Kitinov	7	6
(Czech Republic) J Novák (South Africa) B Talbot	6	5
(Sweden) T Enqvist (Sweden) M Larsson	7	6
(South Africa) D Adams (South Africa) W Ferreira	6	0
7	(Canada) G Connell (United States) P Galbraith	6	7
(South Africa) JL de Jager (Belarus) M Mirnyi	4	6
WC	(United States) B Bryan (United States) M Bryan	6	6	4
(South Africa) N Godwin (The Bahamas) M Merklein	3	7	6
(United States) D Randall (United States) J Waite	7	6
Q	(United States) M Sprengelmeyer (Australia) L Smith	6	4

Second round
(United States) J Gimelstob (Sweden) P Nyborg	6	6
(Croatia) G Ivanišević (North Macedonia) A Kitinov	4	4
(Sweden) T Enqvist (Sweden) M Larsson	2	2
4	(Sweden) J Björkman (Sweden) N Kulti	6	6
7	(Canada) G Connell (United States) P Galbraith	7	7
(South Africa) N Godwin (The Bahamas) M Merklein	6	6
(United States) D Randall (United States) J Waite	7	6
2	(Canada) D Nestor (Czech Republic) C Suk	5	4

Quarterfinals
(United States) J Gimelstob (Sweden) P Nyborg	6	5
4	(Sweden) J Björkman (Sweden) N Kulti	7	7
7	(Canada) G Connell (United States) P Galbraith	6	1	6
(United States) D Randall (United States) J Waite	3	6	1

Semifinals
4	(Sweden) J Björkman (Sweden) N Kulti	6	6
7	(Canada) G Connell (United States) P Galbraith	4	2
