= 2000 RCA Championships – Doubles =

Doubles
- 2000 RCA Championships

Final
- Champions: (Australia) Lleyton Hewitt (Australia) Sandon Stolle
- Runners-up: (Sweden) Jonas Björkman (Belarus) Max Mirnyi
- Score: 6–2, 3–6, 6–3

Events
Singles	Doubles
← 1999 ·	Indianapolis Tennis Championships	· 2001 →

Paul Haarhuis and Jared Palmer were the defending champions, but chose not to participate that year.

Lleyton Hewitt and Sandon Stolle won in the final 6–2, 3–6, 6–3, against Jonas Björkman and Max Mirnyi.

== Seeds ==
1. (Australia) Todd Woodbridge / (Australia) Mark Woodforde (semifinals)
2. (South Africa) Ellis Ferreira / (United States) Rick Leach (semifinals)
3. N/A
4. (Canada) Sébastien Lareau / (Canada) Daniel Nestor (quarterfinals)
5. (Australia) Joshua Eagle / (Australia) Andrew Florent (first round)
6. (Sweden) Jonas Björkman / (Belarus) Max Mirnyi (final)
7. (Zimbabwe) Wayne Black / (Zimbabwe) Kevin Ullyett (quarterfinals)
8. (India) Mahesh Bhupathi / (The Bahamas) Mark Knowles (first round)

== Draw ==
=== Key ===
- Q = Qualifier
- WC = Wild card
- LL = Lucky loser
- Alt = Alternate
- ITF = ITF entry
- PR = Protected ranking
- SR = Special ranking
- SE = Special exempt
- JE = Junior exempt
- JR = Junior Accelerator Programme entrant
- CO = College Accelerator Programme entrant
- NG = Next Gen Accelerator Program entrant
- w/o = Walkover
- r = Retired
- d = Defaulted

=== Finals ===
Semifinals
1	(Australia) Todd Woodbridge (Australia) Mark Woodforde	4	5
(Australia) Lleyton Hewitt (Australia) Sandon Stolle	6	7
6	(Sweden) Jonas Björkman (Belarus) Max Mirnyi	7^{7}	6
2	(South Africa) Ellis Ferreira (United States) Rick Leach	6^{3}	3

Final
(Australia) Lleyton Hewitt (Australia) Sandon Stolle	6	3	6
6	(Sweden) Jonas Björkman (Belarus) Max Mirnyi	2	6	3

=== Top half ===
First round
(United States) J Stark (United States) E Taino	6	6
(Australia) P Kilderry (Australia) P Tramacchi	4	4
(Croatia) G Ivanišević (Sweden) M Tillström	6	4	6
(United States) P Galbraith (Netherlands) J Siemerink	4	6	4
(South Africa) M Barnard (South Africa) R Koenig	2	7^{7}	7
8	(India) M Bhupathi (The Bahamas) M Knowles	6	6^{5}	5
(Australia) L Hewitt (Australia) S Stolle	6	6
(Brazil) J Oncins (Argentina) D Orsanic	3	4
WC	(Brazil) G Kuerten (Israel) H Levy	6	6
Q	(Israel) J Erlich (Israel) L Mor	2	2
(South Africa) N Godwin (Australia) M Hill	7^{10}	6
5	(Australia) J Eagle (Australia) A Florent	6^{8}	3

Second round
1	(Australia) T Woodbridge (Australia) M Woodforde	6	6
(United States) J Stark (United States) E Taino	3	2
(Croatia) G Ivanišević (Sweden) M Tillström	2	6	6^{5}
(South Africa) M Barnard (South Africa) R Koenig	6	4	7^{7}
LL	(Spain) Ó Burrieza (Spain) A Martín	3	4
(Australia) L Hewitt (Australia) S Stolle	6	6
WC	(Brazil) G Kuerten (Israel) H Levy	7^{7}	4	4
(South Africa) N Godwin (Australia) M Hill	6^{3}	6	6

Quarterfinals
1	(Australia) T Woodbridge (Australia) M Woodforde	6	4	7^{7}
(South Africa) M Barnard (South Africa) R Koenig	4	6	6^{2}
(Australia) L Hewitt (Australia) S Stolle	6	6
(South Africa) N Godwin (Australia) M Hill	3	4

Semifinals
1	(Australia) T Woodbridge (Australia) M Woodforde	4	5
(Australia) L Hewitt (Australia) S Stolle	6	7

=== Bottom half ===
First round
6	(Sweden) J Björkman (Belarus) M Mirnyi	6	6^{5}	6
WC	(United States) T Martin (United States) N Overholser	4	7^{7}	3
WC	(Spain) A Costa (Russia) M Safin	4	4
(Italy) M Bertolini (Italy) C Brandi	6	6
(Argentina) G Etlis (United States) J Waite	2	5
Q	(France) N Coutelot (Israel) A Ram	6	7
7	(Zimbabwe) W Black (Zimbabwe) K Ullyett	6^{2}	6	6
WC	(United States) J Blake (United States) T Dent	7^{7}	2	2
(Spain) T Carbonell (Argentina) M García	3	6	6
(Switzerland) R Federer (Australia) A Kratzmann	6	2	4
(Australia) D Macpherson (South Africa) G Stafford	7^{7}	4	4
(Germany) M-K Goellner (North Macedonia) A Kitinov	6^{4}	6	6

Second round
6	(Sweden) J Björkman (Belarus) M Mirnyi	6	6^{5}	6
(Italy) M Bertolini (Italy) C Brandi	3	7^{7}	3
Q	(France) N Coutelot (Israel) A Ram	5	5
4	(Canada) S Lareau (Canada) D Nestor	7	7
7	(Zimbabwe) W Black (Zimbabwe) K Ullyett	6	7
(Spain) T Carbonell (Argentina) M García	2	5
(Germany) M-K Goellner (North Macedonia) A Kitinov	6^{5}	6^{4}
2	(South Africa) E Ferreira (United States) R Leach	7^{7}	7^{7}

Quarterfinals
6	(Sweden) J Björkman (Belarus) M Mirnyi	7^{7}	4	7^{7}
4	(Canada) S Lareau (Canada) D Nestor	6^{3}	6	6^{3}
7	(Zimbabwe) W Black (Zimbabwe) K Ullyett	2	4
2	(South Africa) E Ferreira (United States) R Leach	6	6

Semifinals
6	(Sweden) J Björkman (Belarus) M Mirnyi	7^{7}	6
2	(South Africa) E Ferreira (United States) R Leach	6^{3}	3
