= 2000 RCA Championships – Singles =

Singles
- 2000 RCA Championships

Final
- Champion: (Brazil) Gustavo Kuerten
- Runner-up: (Russia) Marat Safin
- Score: 3–6, 7–6^{(7–2)}, 7–6^{(7–2)}

Events
Singles	Doubles
← 1999 ·	RCA Championships	· 2001 →

Nicolás Lapentti was the defending champion, but lost in the third round to Sébastien Grosjean.

Gustavo Kuerten won in the final 3–6, 7–6^{(7–2)}, 7–6^{(7–2)}, against Marat Safin.

== Seeds ==
The top eight seeds receive a bye into the second round.

1. (Brazil) Gustavo Kuerten (champion)
2. (Russia) Yevgeny Kafelnikov (quarterfinals)
3. (Russia) Marat Safin (final)
4. (Sweden) Thomas Enqvist (quarterfinals)
5. (Australia) Lleyton Hewitt (semifinals)
6. (Ecuador) Nicolás Lapentti (third round)
7. (United Kingdom) Tim Henman (semifinals)
8. (Chile) Marcelo Ríos (second round, retired due to a groin injury)
9. (Morocco) Younes El Aynaoui (third round)
10. (South Africa) Wayne Ferreira (quarterfinals)
11. (Spain) Albert Costa (third round)
12. (France) Sébastien Grosjean (quarterfinals)
13. (Morocco) Karim Alami (third round)
14. (United States) Todd Martin (second round)
15. (Romania) Andrei Pavel (first round)
16. (Czech Republic) Jiří Novák (second round, withdrew due to an illness)

== Draw ==
=== Key ===
- Q = Qualifier
- WC = Wild card
- LL = Lucky loser
- Alt = Alternate
- SE = Special exempt
- PR = Protected ranking
- ITF = ITF entry
- JE = Junior exempt
- w/o = Walkover
- r = Retired
- d = Defaulted
- SR = Special ranking

=== Finals ===
Quarterfinals
1	(Brazil) Gustavo Kuerten	6	6
10	(South Africa) Wayne Ferreira	2	3
4	(Sweden) Thomas Enqvist	3	3
5	(Australia) Lleyton Hewitt	6	6
12	(France) Sébastien Grosjean	6	3	4
3	(Russia) Marat Safin	0	6	6
7	(United Kingdom) Tim Henman	7^{7}	6
2	(Russia) Yevgeny Kafelnikov	6^{4}	2

Semifinals
1	(Brazil) Gustavo Kuerten	7	6
5	(Australia) Lleyton Hewitt	5	2
3	(Russia) Marat Safin	7	6
7	(United Kingdom) Tim Henman	5	4

Final
1	(Brazil) Gustavo Kuerten	3	7^{7}	7^{7}
3	(Russia) Marat Safin	6	6^{2}	6^{2}

=== Top half ===
==== Section 1 ====
First round
(Netherlands) J Siemerink	3	1
WC	(Australia) T Woodbridge	6	6
WC	(United States) T Dent	6	6
(Spain) F Clavet	3	4
(Argentina) G Etlis	3	2
16	(Czech Republic) J Novák	6	6
10	(South Africa) W Ferreira	6	6
(France) A Di Pasquale	4	2
(Sweden) J Björkman	3	4
Q	(France) P-H Mathieu	6	6
Q	(Belgium) X Malisse	6	6
Q	(Israel) L Mor	3	2

Second round
1	(Brazil) G Kuerten	5	6	6
WC	(Australia) T Woodbridge	7	4	1
WC	(United States) T Dent	w/o
16	(Czech Republic) J Novák
10	(South Africa) W Ferreira	6	1
Q	(France) P-H Mathieu	2	0^{r}
Q	(Belgium) X Malisse	6
8	(Chile) M Ríos	4	r

Third round
1	(Brazil) G Kuerten	6	7^{7}
WC	(United States) T Dent	2	6^{4}
10	(South Africa) W Ferreira	6	6
Q	(Belgium) X Malisse	4	2

Quarterfinals
1	(Brazil) G Kuerten	6	6
10	(South Africa) W Ferreira	2	3

==== Section 2 ====
First round
Q	(France) L Roux	6	6
(Netherlands) S Schalken	3	2
(Spain) C Moyá	6	6
(Spain) H Arazi	4	4
(United States) C Mamiit	3	3
14	(United States) T Martin	6	6
11	(Spain) A Costa	7	6
(Croatia) G Ivanišević	5	2
WC	(United States) P King	3	3
(Switzerland) M Kratochvil	6	6
(Austria) S Koubek	6	3	7^{7}
Q	(United States) D Wheaton	3	6	6^{5}

Second round
4	(Sweden) T Enqvist	6	7^{7}
Q	(France) L Roux	3	6^{4}
(Spain) C Moyá	6	6
14	(United States) T Martin	4	4
11	(Spain) A Costa	6	6^{5}	6
Q	(Switzerland) M Kratochvil	1	7^{7}	4
(Austria) S Koubek	1	0
5	(Australia) L Hewitt	6	6

Third round
4	(Sweden) T Enqvist	6	2	6
(Spain) C Moyá	2	6	4
11	(Spain) A Costa	2	4
5	(Australia) L Hewitt	6	6

Quarterfinals
4	(Sweden) T Enqvist	3	3
5	(Australia) L Hewitt	6	6

=== Bottom half ===
==== Section 3 ====
First round
Q	(The Bahamas) M Knowles	4	5
(Canada) S Lareau	6	7
(Zimbabwe) K Ullyett	3	0
Q	(Zimbabwe) W Black	6	6
(Belarus) M Mirnyi	6	6^{5}	4
12	(France) S Grosjean	3	7^{7}	6
13	(Morocco) K Alami	6	3	7
(France) C Saulnier	4	6	5
(United States) V Spadea	6	3	4
WC	(Belarus) V Voltchkov	3	6	6
(Israel) H Levy	6	6
(Argentina) M Zabaleta	3	1

Second round
6	(Ecuador) N Lapentti	6	3	6
(Canada) S Lareau	3	6	2
Q	(Zimbabwe) W Black	0	6^{7}
12	(France) S Grosjean	6	7^{9}
13	(Morocco) K Alami	6	6
WC	(Belarus) V Voltchkov	4	3
(Israel) H Levy	4	2
3	(Russia) M Safin	6	6

Third round
6	(Ecuador) N Lapentti	6^{3}	2
12	(France) S Grosjean	7^{7}	6
13	(Morocco) K Alami	4	4
3	(Russia) M Safin	6	6

Quarterfinals
12	(France) S Grosjean	6	3	4
3	(Russia) M Safin	0	6	6

==== Section 4 ====
First round
WC	(United States) J Blake	3	2
(Spain) A Martín	6	6
(France) A Clément	6	0	3
(Chile) N Massú	1	6	6
(Sweden) T Johansson	6^{4}	4
9	(Morocco) Y El Aynaoui	7^{7}	6
15	(Romania) A Pavel	6^{0}	6	2
(Italy) G Pozzi	7^{7}	2	6
(Switzerland) R Federer	4	5
(Australia) J Sekulov	6	7
(Argentina) JI Chela	5	7	1
(Sweden) M Tillström	7	5	6

Second round
7	(United Kingdom) T Henman	6	6
(Spain) A Martín	4	2
(Chile) N Massú	4	2
9	(Morocco) Y El Aynaoui	6	6
(Italy) G Pozzi	6	6
(Australia) J Sekulov	2	4
(Sweden) M Tillström	2	1
2	(Russia) Y Kafelnikov	6	6

Third round
7	(United Kingdom) T Henman	4	6	7^{7}
9	(Morocco) Y El Aynaoui	6	2	6^{2}
(Italy) G Pozzi	3	3
2	(Russia) Y Kafelnikov	6	6

Quarterfinals
7	(United Kingdom) T Henman	7^{7}	6
2	(Russia) Y Kafelnikov	6^{4}	2
