= 1998 RCA Championships – Singles =

Singles
- 1998 RCA Championships

Final
- Champion: (Spain) Àlex Corretja
- Runner-up: (United States) Andre Agassi
- Score: 2–6, 6–2, 6–3

Events
Singles	Doubles
← 1997 ·	RCA Championships	· 1999 →

Jonas Björkman was the defending champion, but lost in the second round to Jason Stoltenberg.

Àlex Corretja won the title, defeating Andre Agassi in the final 2–6, 6–2, 6–3.

== Seeds ==
The top eight seeds received a bye into the second round.

1. (Chile) Marcelo Ríos (third round)
2. (Spain) Carlos Moyá (second round)
3. (United Kingdom) Greg Rusedski (quarterfinals)
4. (Sweden) Jonas Björkman (second round)
5. (United States) Andre Agassi (final)
6. (Spain) Àlex Corretja (champion)
7. (Spain) Albert Costa (second round)
8. (Spain) Alberto Berasategui (second round)
9. (France) Cédric Pioline (second round)
10. (Spain) Félix Mantilla (second round)
11. (Australia) Mark Philippoussis (third round)
12. (Austria) Thomas Muster (second round)
13. (Spain) Francisco Clavet (third round)
14. (South Africa) Wayne Ferreira (quarterfinals)
15. (United States) Todd Martin (semifinals)
16. (Italy) Andrea Gaudenzi (first round)

== Draw ==
=== Key ===
- Q = Qualifier
- WC = Wild card
- LL = Lucky loser
- Alt = Alternate
- SE = Special exempt
- PR = Protected ranking
- ITF = ITF entry
- JE = Junior exempt
- w/o = Walkover
- r = Retired
- d = Defaulted
- SR = Special ranking

=== Finals ===
Quarterfinals
(Zimbabwe) Byron Black	1	6	4
(Paraguay) Ramón Delgado	6	2	6
14	(South Africa) Wayne Ferreira	2	1
5	(United States) Andre Agassi	6	6
6	(Spain) Àlex Corretja	6	6
3	(United Kingdom) Greg Rusedski	4	3
(Morocco) Hicham Arazi	6^{4}	6^{11}
15	(United States) Todd Martin	7^{7}	7^{13}

Semifinals
(Paraguay) Ramón Delgado	6^{6}	3
5	(United States) Andre Agassi	7^{8}	6
6	(Spain) Àlex Corretja	6	7^{7}
15	(United States) Todd Martin	2	6^{4}

Final
5	(United States) Andre Agassi	6	2	3
6	(Spain) Àlex Corretja	2	6	6

=== Top half ===
==== Section 1 ====
First round
(United States) S Campbell	1	6	1
WC	(United States) B Bryan	6	0	6
(Zimbabwe) B Black	6	6
Q	(Australia) B Ellwood	2	2
(Italy) G Pozzi	7^{7}	6
16	(Italy) A Gaudenzi	6^{3}	1
9	(France) C Pioline	7^{7}	6
(Czech Republic) M Damm	6^{2}	2
(France) J Golmard	3	2
(Paraguay) R Delgado	6	6
(Spain) J Burillo	4	3
WC	(United States) B MacPhie	6	6

Second round
1	(Chile) M Ríos	6	6
WC	(United States) B Bryan	4	4
(Zimbabwe) B Black	7^{7}	6
(Italy) G Pozzi	6^{1}	4
9	(France) C Pioline	6^{3}	1
(Paraguay) R Delgado	7^{7}	6
WC	(United States) B MacPhie	6	6
8	(Spain) A Berasategui	1	4

Third round
1	(Chile) M Ríos	7	1	5
(Zimbabwe) B Black	5	6	7
(Paraguay) R Delgado	7	7
WC	(United States) B MacPhie	5	5

Quarterfinals
(Zimbabwe) B Black	1	6	4
(Paraguay) R Delgado	6	2	6

==== Section 2 ====
First round
(Australia) J Stoltenberg	6^{5}	6	6
(Australia) A Ilie	7^{7}	3	4
WC	(Belgium) X Malisse	3	5
(Czech Republic) J Novák	6	7
(Canada) D Nestor	4	6^{4}
14	(South Africa) W Ferreira	6	7^{7}
12	(Austria) T Muster	6	6
Q	(United States) P Goldstein	2	2
(Zimbabwe) W Black	6	3	7^{8}
Q	(Germany) B Karbacher	1	6	6^{6}
Q	(United States) M Sell	5	6	3
(Australia) M Tebbutt	7	4	6

Second round
4	(Sweden) J Björkman	5	3
(Australia) J Stoltenberg	7	6
(Czech Republic) J Novák	6^{3}	2
14	(South Africa) W Ferreira	7^{7}	6
12	(Austria) T Muster	3	7	4
(Zimbabwe) W Black	6	5	6
(Australia) M Tebbutt	1	0
5	(United States) A Agassi	6	6

Third round
(Australia) J Stoltenberg	6	5	6^{10}
14	(South Africa) W Ferreira	3	7	7^{12}
(Zimbabwe) W Black	6^{4}	6	1
5	(United States) A Agassi	7^{7}	3	6

Quarterfinals
14	(South Africa) W Ferreira	2	1
5	(United States) A Agassi	6	6

=== Bottom half ===
==== Section 3 ====
First round
(Australia) S Draper	6	6^{5}	6
Q	(Italy) L Tieleman	4	7^{7}	3
(Romania) A Voinea	6	6
LL	(Finland) T Ketola	2	0
(South Africa) G Stafford	3	2
11	(Australia) M Philippoussis	6	6
13	(Spain) F Clavet	6	6
Q	(The Bahamas) M Merklein	3	2
(Germany) T Haas	7^{7}	6
(Spain) F Vicente	6^{5}	2
(Sweden) M Larsson	2	7^{7}	6
(France) S Grosjean	6	6^{3}	2

Second round
6	(Spain) À Corretja	6	6^{2}	7
(Australia) S Draper	3	7^{7}	5
(Romania) A Voinea	5	4
11	(Australia) M Philippoussis	7	6
13	(Spain) F Clavet	6	6
(Germany) T Haas	4	0
(Sweden) M Larsson	6^{2}	3
3	(United Kingdom) G Rusedski	7^{7}	6

Third round
6	(Spain) À Corretja	4	6	6
11	(Australia) M Philippoussis	6	4	3
13	(Spain) F Clavet	1	6^{6}
3	(United Kingdom) G Rusedski	6	7^{8}

Quarterfinals
6	(Spain) À Corretja	6	6
3	(United Kingdom) G Rusedski	4	3

==== Section 4 ====
First round
WC	(United States) T Dent	7^{7}	5	1
WC	(United States) D Wheaton	6^{1}	7	6
(Morocco) H Arazi	7^{7}	6
(South Africa) M Ondruska	6^{4}	2
(United States) V Spadea	5	6^{3}
10	(Spain) F Mantilla	7	7^{7}
15	(United States) T Martin	6	6
Q	(United States) W McGuire	3	4
(Netherlands) P Haarhuis	4	4
(France) A Clément	6	6
(Sweden) T Johansson	6	6
(Sweden) M Tillström	3	4

Second round
7	(Spain) A Costa	2	4
WC	(United States) D Wheaton	6	6
(Morocco) H Arazi	6	4	6
10	(Spain) F Mantilla	2	6	4
15	(United States) T Martin	4	6	6
(France) A Clément	6	1	4
(Sweden) T Johansson	6^{5}	6	6
2	(Spain) C Moyá	7^{7}	0	1

Third round
WC	(United States) D Wheaton	3	2
(Morocco) H Arazi	6	6
15	(United States) T Martin	6	7^{7}
(Sweden) T Johansson	1	6^{5}

Quarterfinals
(Morocco) H Arazi	6^{4}	6^{11}
15	(United States) T Martin	7^{7}	7^{13}
