= 1999 RCA Championships – Singles =

Singles
- 1999 RCA Championships

Final
- Champion: (Ecuador) Nicolás Lapentti
- Runner-up: (United States) Vince Spadea
- Score: 4–6, 6–4, 6–4

Events
Singles	Doubles
← 1998 ·	RCA Championships	· 2000 →

Àlex Corretja was the defending champion, but did not participate.

Nicolás Lapentti won the title, defeating Vince Spadea in the final 4–6, 6–4, 6–4.

== Seeds ==
The top eight seeds received a bye into the second round.

1. (United States) Pete Sampras (quarterfinals, retired due to a hip injury)
2. (Australia) Patrick Rafter (quarterfinals, withdrew due to a shoulder injury)
3. (Brazil) Gustavo Kuerten (quarterfinals)
4. (Spain) Carlos Moyá (quarterfinals)
5. (Australia) Mark Philippoussis (second round)
6. (Chile) Marcelo Ríos (third round)
7. (Germany) Tommy Haas (second round)
8. (Sweden) Thomas Johansson (second round)
9. (Spain) Félix Mantilla (first round)
10. (Sweden) Thomas Enqvist (second round)
11. (Ecuador) Nicolás Lapentti (champion)
12. (Spain) Albert Costa (second round)
13. (Argentina) Mariano Zabaleta (first round)
14. (France) Cédric Pioline (third round)
15. (Spain) Francisco Clavet (first round)
16. (Brazil) Fernando Meligeni (first round)

== Draw ==
=== Key ===
- Q = Qualifier
- WC = Wild card
- LL = Lucky loser
- Alt = Alternate
- SE = Special exempt
- PR = Protected ranking
- ITF = ITF entry
- JE = Junior exempt
- w/o = Walkover
- r = Retired
- d = Defaulted
- SR = Special ranking

=== Finals ===
Quarterfinals
1	(United States) Pete Sampras	4	6	0^{r}
(United States) Vince Spadea	6	3	0
3	(Brazil) Gustavo Kuerten	4	3
(France) Sébastien Grosjean	6	6
11	(Ecuador) Nicolás Lapentti	6	6
4	(Spain) Carlos Moyá	1	2
(Netherlands) Jan Siemerink	w/o
2	(Australia) Patrick Rafter

Semifinals
(United States) Vince Spadea	6	6^{4}	7^{7}
(France) Sébastien Grosjean	3	7^{7}	6^{4}
11	(Ecuador) Nicolás Lapentti	6	6
(Netherlands) Jan Siemerink	4	2

Final
(United States) Vince Spadea	6	4	4
11	(Ecuador) Nicolás Lapentti	4	6	6

=== Top half ===
==== Section 1 ====
First round
(France) G Raoux	6	6
(Australia) J Stoltenberg	3	4
Q	(France) N Escudé	2	4
(South Africa) W Ferreira	6	6
Q	(Belarus) M Mirnyi	7^{7}	6
16	(Brazil) F Meligeni	6^{5}	3
9	(Spain) F Mantilla	3	7^{7}	2
(United States) V Spadea	6	6^{2}	6
WC	(United States) D Wheaton	2	2
(Germany) A Pretzsch	6	6
(Czech Republic) B Ulihrach	4	4
(France) A Clément	6	6

Second round
1	(United States) P Sampras	6	7
(France) G Raoux	4	5
(South Africa) W Ferreira	5	4
Q	(Belarus) M Mirnyi	7	6
(United States) V Spadea	6	6
(Germany) A Pretzsch	3	4
(France) A Clément	6	6
8	(Sweden) T Johansson	3	2

Third round
1	(United States) P Sampras	7^{7}	6
Q	(Belarus) M Mirnyi	6^{4}	3
(United States) V Spadea	7	7^{7}
(France) A Clément	5	6^{5}

Quarterfinals
1	(United States) P Sampras	4	6	0^{r}
(United States) V Spadea	6	3	0

==== Section 2 ====
First round
Q	(Israel) N Okun	2	6	4
(Netherlands) S Schalken	6	4	6
(United States) C Woodruff	4	2
(Romania) A Pavel	6	6
(Sweden) M Norman	7^{7}	6
13	(Argentina) M Zabaleta	6^{5}	3
12	(Spain) A Costa	7^{7}	6
(India) L Paes	6^{3}	4
(France) S Grosjean	7^{7}	6
WC	(United States) R Reneberg	6^{4}	3
Q	(Israel) H Levy	7	6
(Czech Republic) J Novák	5	1

Second round
3	(Brazil) G Kuerten	6	6
(Netherlands) S Schalken	4	2
(Romania) A Pavel	3	1
(Sweden) M Norman	6	6
12	(Spain) A Costa	7^{7}	2	5
(France) S Grosjean	6^{0}	6	7
Q	(Israel) H Levy	2	6^{5}
6	(Chile) M Ríos	6	7^{7}

Third round
3	(Brazil) G Kuerten	6	7
(Sweden) M Norman	4	5
(France) S Grosjean	6	6
6	(Chile) M Ríos	4	2

Quarterfinals
3	(Brazil) G Kuerten	4	3
(France) S Grosjean	6	6

=== Bottom half ===
==== Section 3 ====
First round
(Argentina) G Cañas	5	1
Q	(France) A Di Pasquale	7	6
Q	(United States) J Palmer	6^{6}	6	6
(Croatia) G Ivanišević	7^{8}	4	3
Q	(South Africa) G Stafford	3	5
11	(Ecuador) N Lapentti	6	7
14	(France) C Pioline	7^{8}	6
WC	(United States) J Morrison	6^{6}	3
(Spain) A Martín	7^{7}	6
WC	(United States) B Bryan	6^{4}	3
(Czech Republic) D Vacek	3	6	6
(Argentina) M Rodríguez	6	2	4

Second round
5	(Australia) M Philippoussis	3	6	1
Q	(France) A Di Pasquale	6	3	6
Q	(United States) J Palmer	2	2
11	(Ecuador) N Lapentti	6	6
14	(France) C Pioline	6	6
(Spain) A Martín	0	3
(Czech Republic) D Vacek	6	4	6^{6}
4	(Spain) C Moyá	1	6	7^{8}

Third round
Q	(France) A Di Pasquale	4	6^{5}
11	(Ecuador) N Lapentti	6	7^{7}
14	(France) C Pioline	4	2
4	(Spain) C Moyá	6	6

Quarterfinals
11	(Ecuador) N Lapentti	6	6
4	(Spain) C Moyá	1	2

==== Section 4 ====
First round
(Austria) M Hipfl	6	3	4
(Netherlands) J Siemerink	4	6	6
(Sweden) M Larsson	6	7^{7}
(Sweden) J Björkman	4	6^{4}
(Italy) M Navarra	5	0
10	(Sweden) T Enqvist	7	6
15	(Spain) F Clavet	6^{1}	1
(Canada) D Nestor	7^{7}	6
(Netherlands) P Haarhuis	3	2
(Germany) D Prinosil	6	6
(France) A Dupuis	7^{7}	6
(Australia) A Ilie	6^{3}	2

Second round
7	(Germany) T Haas	3	5
(Netherlands) J Siemerink	6	7
(Sweden) M Larsson	7^{8}	6
10	(Sweden) T Enqvist	6^{6}	4
(Canada) D Nestor	6	6
(Germany) D Prinosil	3	3
(France) A Dupuis	6	2	6^{1}
2	(Australia) P Rafter	2	6	7^{7}

Third round
(Netherlands) J Siemerink	6	6
(Sweden) M Larsson	2	3
(Canada) D Nestor	6^{5}	2
2	(Australia) P Rafter	7^{7}	6

Quarterfinals
(Netherlands) J Siemerink	w/o
2	(Australia) P Rafter
