= 2001 RCA Championships – Doubles =

Doubles
- 2001 RCA Championships

Final
- Champions: (The Bahamas) Mark Knowles (United States) Brian MacPhie
- Runners-up: (India) Mahesh Bhupathi (Canada) Sébastien Lareau
- Score: 7–6^{(7–5)}, 5–7, 6–4

Events
Singles	Doubles
← 2000 ·	Indianapolis Tennis Championships	· 2002 →

Lleyton Hewitt and Sandon Stolle were the defending champions but only Stolle competed that year with Max Mirnyi.

Mirnyi and Stolle lost in the quarterfinals to Mark Knowles and Brian MacPhie.

Knowles and MacPhie won in the final 7–6^{(7–5)}, 5–7, 6–4 against Mahesh Bhupathi and Sébastien Lareau.

== Seeds ==
The top four seeded teams received byes into the second round.

1. (Sweden) Jonas Björkman / (Australia) Todd Woodbridge (quarterfinals)
2. (Belarus) Max Mirnyi / (Australia) Sandon Stolle (quarterfinals)
3. (South Africa) Ellis Ferreira / (United States) Rick Leach (quarterfinals)
4. (Australia) Joshua Eagle / (Australia) Andrew Florent (second round)
5. (The Bahamas) Mark Knowles / (United States) Brian MacPhie (champions)
6. (Czech Republic) Leoš Friedl / (Czech Republic) Petr Pála (first round)
7. (South Africa) Chris Haggard / (Belgium) Tom Vanhoudt (semifinals)
8. (India) Mahesh Bhupathi / (Canada) Sébastien Lareau (final)

== Draw ==
=== Key ===
- Q = Qualifier
- WC = Wild card
- LL = Lucky loser
- Alt = Alternate
- SE = Special exempt
- PR = Protected ranking
- ITF = ITF entry
- JE = Junior exempt
- w/o = Walkover
- r = Retired
- d = Defaulted
- SR = Special ranking

=== Finals ===
Semifinals

Final

8
- (India) Mahesh Bhupathi
- (Canada) Sébastien Lareau
3
6
7^{7}

- (South Africa) John-Laffnie de Jager
- (South Africa) Robbie Koenig
6
4
6^{5}

8
- (India) Mahesh Bhupathi
- (Canada) Sébastien Lareau
6^{5}
7
4

5
- (The Bahamas) Mark Knowles
- (United States) Brian MacPhie
7^{7}
5
6

7
- (South Africa) Chris Haggard
- (Belgium) Tom Vanhoudt
6
3
0

5
- (The Bahamas) Mark Knowles
- (United States) Brian MacPhie
2
6
6

=== Top half ===
First round

Second round

Quarterfinals

Semifinals

1
- (Sweden) J Björkman
- (Australia) T Woodbridge
6
7^{7}

- (United States) B Coupe
- (Brazil) A Prieto
6^{5}
1

- (United States) K Kim
- (United States) G Weiner
1
6^{5}

- (United States) K Kim
- (United States) G Weiner
7^{7}
6

1
- (Sweden) J Björkman
- (Australia) T Woodbridge
4
6
1

- (Germany) M Hilpert
- (Croatia) L Zovko
3
4

8
- (India) M Bhupathi
- (Canada) S Lareau
6
3
6

(United States) J Blake
(Federal Republic of Yugoslavia) N Zimonjić
6
6

(United States) J Blake
(Federal Republic of Yugoslavia) N Zimonjić
4
2

WC
- (United States) M Fish
- (Romania) A Pavel
4
6
4

8
- (India) M Bhupathi
- (Canada) S Lareau
6
6

8
- (India) M Bhupathi
- (Canada) S Lareau
6
2
6

8
- (India) M Bhupathi
- (Canada) S Lareau
3
6
7^{7}

- (South Africa) J-L de Jager
- (South Africa) R Koenig
6
4
6^{5}

4
- (Australia) J Eagle
- (Australia) A Florent
3
2

- (South Africa) J-L de Jager
- (South Africa) R Koenig
7^{8}
7

- (South Africa) J-L de Jager
- (South Africa) R Koenig
6
6

- (Croatia) G Ivanišević
- (Croatia) I Ljubičić
6^{6}
5

- (South Africa) J-L de Jager
- (South Africa) R Koenig
6

- (United States) T Dent
- (United States) C Woodruff
3
6
6

- (United States) T Dent
- (United States) C Woodruff
3
r

- (Australia) A Kratzmann
- (Australia) P Tramacchi
6
1
2

- (United States) T Dent
- (United States) C Woodruff
6
7^{7}

- (Czech Republic) O Fukárek
- (Spain) T Robredo
3
6
6

- (Czech Republic) O Fukárek
- (Spain) T Robredo
3
6^{4}

6
- (Czech Republic) L Friedl
- (Czech Republic) P Pála
6
4
2

=== Bottom half ===
First round

Second round

Quarterfinals

Semifinals

7
- (South Africa) C Haggard
- (Belgium) T Vanhoudt
3
6
6

- (Brazil) A Sá
- (Brazil) A Simoni
6
4
0

7
- (South Africa) C Haggard
- (Belgium) T Vanhoudt
6
6

- (United States) D Bowen
- (Australia) A Fisher
6
6

- (United States) D Bowen
- (Australia) A Fisher
1
3

WC
- (United States) R Ginepri
- (United States) R Ram
4
1

7
- (South Africa) C Haggard
- (Belgium) T Vanhoudt
7^{7}
6

- (Czech Republic) P Luxa
- (Czech Republic) R Štěpánek
6
6

3
- (South Africa) E Ferreira
- (United States) R Leach
6^{3}
3

WC
- (Australia) A Ilie
- (United States) M Russell
1
3

- (Czech Republic) P Luxa
- (Czech Republic) R Štěpánek
4
2

3
- (South Africa) E Ferreira
- (United States) R Leach
6
6

7
- (South Africa) C Haggard
- (Belgium) T Vanhoudt
6
3
0

5
- (The Bahamas) M Knowles
- (United States) B MacPhie
6
6

5
- (The Bahamas) M Knowles
- (United States) B MacPhie
2
6
6

- (Israel) H Levy
- (United States) J Waite
1
4

5
- (The Bahamas) M Knowles
- (United States) B MacPhie
6^{4}
7^{7}
6

- (France) A Clément
- (France) N Escudé
6^{5}
6
6

- (France) A Clément
- (France) N Escudé
7^{7}
6^{4}
3

WC
- (Morocco) H Arazi
- (France) P-H Mathieu
7^{7}
3
2

5
- (The Bahamas) M Knowles
- (United States) B MacPhie
7^{7}
6

WC
- (United States) E Taino
- (United States) D Wheaton
6
7^{7}

2
- (Belarus) M Mirnyi
- (Australia) S Stolle
6^{4}
4

WC
- (Sweden) T Johansson
- (France) C Pioline
4
6^{4}

WC
- (United States) E Taino
- (United States) D Wheaton
6^{5}
6^{5}

2
- (Belarus) M Mirnyi
- (Australia) S Stolle
7^{7}
7^{7}
