= 1996 RCA Championships – Singles =

Singles
- 1996 RCA Championships

Final
- Champion: (United States) Pete Sampras
- Runner-up: (Croatia) Goran Ivanišević
- Score: 7–6^{(7–3)}, 7–5

Details
- Draw: 56 (5WC/7Q)
- Seeds: 16

Events
Singles	Doubles
- Indianapolis Tennis Championships

Thomas Enqvist was the defending champion but lost in the quarterfinals to Todd Martin.

Pete Sampras won in the final 7–6^{(7–3)}, 7–5 against Goran Ivanišević.

In a second round match, Andre Agassi was defaulted after swearing at the chair umpire.

== Seeds ==
The top eight seeds received a bye to the second round.

1. (United States) Pete Sampras (champion)
2. (Croatia) Goran Ivanišević (final)
3. (United States) Andre Agassi (second round, defaulted)
4. (Sweden) Thomas Enqvist (quarterfinals)
5. (United States) Todd Martin (semifinals)
6. (United States) Richey Reneberg (third round)
7. (Australia) Jason Stoltenberg (second round)
8. (Italy) Renzo Furlan (second round)
9. (Sweden) Stefan Edberg (third round)
10. (Australia) Mark Woodforde (third round)
11. (Spain) Àlex Corretja (quarterfinals)
12. (United Kingdom) Tim Henman (first round)
13. (Czech Republic) Bohdan Ulihrach (semifinals)
14. (Australia) Todd Woodbridge (second round)
15. (Belgium) Filip Dewulf (first round)
16. (Czech Republic) Petr Korda (third round)

== Draw ==
Key

- Q = Qualifier
- WC = Wild card
- LL = Lucky loser
- Alt = Alternate
- ITF = ITF entry
- PR = Protected ranking
- SR = Special ranking
- SE = Special exempt
- JE = Junior exempt
- JR = Junior Accelerator Programme entrant
- CO = College Accelerator Programme entrant
- NG = Next Gen Accelerator Program entrant
- w/o = Walkover
- r = Retired
- d = Defaulted

=== Finals ===
Semifinals
1	(United States) Pete Sampras	6	6
13	(Czech Republic) Bohdan Ulihrach	1	4
5	(United States) Todd Martin	2	4
2	(Croatia) Goran Ivanišević	6	6

Final
1	(United States) Pete Sampras	7^{7}	7
2	(Croatia) Goran Ivanišević	6^{3}	5

=== Top half ===
==== Section 1 ====
First round
Q	(United States) D Johnson	6	7^{7}
(Switzerland) J Hlasek	4	6^{2}
(South Africa) M Ondruska	6	6
(Romania) A Voinea	1	2
Q	(United States) S Bryan	6	6
15	(Belgium) F Dewulf	1	2
10	(Australia) M Woodforde	4	6	7
Q	(United States) W McGuire	6	3	5
WC	(United States) J Salzenstein	6	1	7^{7}
Q	(United States) G Weiner	4	6	6^{3}
(Belgium) D Norman	3	3
WC	(Germany) T Haas	6	6

Second round
1	(United States) P Sampras	7^{7}	6^{8}	6
Q	(United States) D Johnson	6^{3}	7^{10}	2
(South Africa) M Ondruska	6	7^{7}
Q	(United States) S Bryan	2	6^{5}
10	(Australia) M Woodforde	6	7^{12}
WC	(United States) J Salzenstein	2	6^{10}
WC	(Germany) T Haas	6	6
8	(Italy) R Furlan	1	2

Third round
1	(United States) P Sampras	6	6
(South Africa) M Ondruska	1	2
10	(Australia) M Woodforde	6^{3}	2
WC	(Germany) T Haas	7^{7}	6

Quarterfinals
1	(United States) P Sampras	6	6
WC	(Germany) T Haas	3	4

==== Section 2 ====
First round
Q	(United States) F Montana	3	6^{4}
(Canada) D Nestor	6	7^{7}
(Italy) G Pozzi	6	5	1
(Sweden) T Johansson	3	7	6
(Spain) J Burillo	2	4
13	(Czech Republic) B Ulihrach	6	6
11	(Spain) À Corretja	6	6
(France) G Raoux	1	3
(Spain) I Truyol	6	6
(Germany) B Karbacher	2	0
(Italy) C Caratti	7	4	7
Q	(Croatia) S Hiršzon	5	6	5

Second round
3	(United States) A Agassi	6	2^{d}
(Canada) D Nestor	1	3
(Sweden) T Johansson	3	4
13	(Czech Republic) B Ulihrach	6	6
11	(Spain) À Corretja	6	4	6
(Spain) I Truyol	1	6	1
(Italy) C Caratti	3	1
6	(United States) R Reneberg	6	6

Third round
(Canada) D Nestor	2	2
13	(Czech Republic) B Ulihrach	6	6
11	(Spain) À Corretja	6	6^{7}	6
6	(United States) R Reneberg	3	7^{9}	2

Quarterfinals
13	(Czech Republic) B Ulihrach	6	7
11	(Spain) À Corretja	4	5

=== Bottom half ===
==== Section 3 ====
First round
WC	(United States) J Grabb	3	6	0
(Colombia) M Hadad	6	2	6
(South Africa) G Stafford	2	5
(United States) C Woodruff	6	7
(The Bahamas) M Knowles	6	2	6
12	(United Kingdom) T Henman	2	6	4
14	(Australia) T Woodbridge	6	6
(Australia) S Draper	3	4
(Brazil) R Jabali	3	6^{4}
(United States) D Wheaton	6	7^{7}
Q	(United Kingdom) M Petchey	5	2
(Canada) S Lareau	7	6

Second round
5	(United States) T Martin	2	6	6
(Colombia) M Hadad	6	2	1
(United States) C Woodruff	7	3	4
(The Bahamas) M Knowles	5	6	1^{r}
14	(Australia) T Woodbridge	1	1
(United States) D Wheaton	6	6
(Canada) S Lareau	4	2
4	(Sweden) T Enqvist	6	6

Third round
5	(United States) T Martin	6	6
(United States) C Woodruff	4	3
(United States) D Wheaton	4	3
4	(Sweden) T Enqvist	6	6

Quarterfinals
5	(United States) T Martin	6	1	7^{7}
4	(Sweden) T Enqvist	3	6	6^{3}

==== Section 4 ====
First round
WC	(United States) K Kinnear	4	3
(France) L Roux	6	6
(Czech Republic) M Damm	6^{5}	4
(Argentina) G Etlis	7^{7}	6
(Australia) M Tebbutt	2	2
9	(Sweden) S Edberg	6	6
16	(Czech Republic) P Korda	6	4	6
(Morocco) H Arazi	3	6	2
(United States) J Stark	2	3
(Italy) S Pescosolido	6	6
WC	(United States) J Gimelstob	4	4
(Argentina) J Frana	6	6

Second round
7	(Australia) J Stoltenberg	5	4
(France) L Roux	7	6
(Argentina) G Etlis	6^{5}	4
9	(Sweden) S Edberg	7^{7}	6
16	(Czech Republic) P Korda	2	6	7
(Italy) S Pescosolido	6	4	5
(Argentina) J Frana	7^{7}	4	5
2	(Croatia) G Ivanišević	6^{4}	6	7

Third round
(France) L Roux	6	6
9	(Sweden) S Edberg	3	4
16	(Czech Republic) P Korda	3	3
2	(Croatia) G Ivanišević	6	6

Quarterfinals
(France) L Roux	7^{7}	6^{5}	2
2	(Croatia) G Ivanišević	6^{5}	7^{7}	6
