= 1996 RCA Championships – Doubles =

Doubles
- 1996 RCA Championships

Final
- Champions: (United States) Jim Grabb; (United States) Richey Reneberg
- Runners-up: (Czech Republic) Petr Korda; (Czech Republic) Cyril Suk
- Score: 7–6, 4–6, 6–4

Details
- Draw: 28
- Seeds: 8

Events
Singles	Doubles
- Indianapolis Tennis Championships

Mark Knowles and Daniel Nestor were the defending champions but lost in the second round to Joshua Eagle and Andrew Florent.

Jim Grabb and Richey Reneberg won in the final 7–6, 4–6, 6–4 against Petr Korda and Cyril Suk.

== Seeds ==
The top four seeded teams received byes into the second round.

1. (The Bahamas) Mark Knowles / (Canada) Daniel Nestor (second round)
2. (Canada) Sébastien Lareau / (United States) Jonathan Stark (quarterfinals)
3. (Czech Republic) Petr Korda / (Czech Republic) Cyril Suk (final)
4. (Argentina) Javier Frana / (United States) Rick Leach (quarterfinals)
5. (United States) Trevor Kronemann / (Australia) David Macpherson (second round)
6. (United States) Jim Grabb / (United States) Richey Reneberg (champions)
7. (Czech Republic) Martin Damm / (Sweden) Peter Nyborg (quarterfinals)
8. (United States) Brian MacPhie / (Australia) Michael Tebbutt (first round)

== Draw ==
Key

- Q = Qualifier
- WC = Wild card
- LL = Lucky loser
- Alt = Alternate
- ITF = ITF entry
- PR = Protected ranking
- SR = Special ranking
- SE = Special exempt
- JE = Junior exempt
- JR = Junior Accelerator Programme entrant
- CO = College Accelerator Programme entrant
- NG = Next Gen Accelerator Program entrant
- w/o = Walkover
- r = Retired
- d = Defaulted

=== Final ===
Semifinals

Final

- (Australia) Joshua Eagle
- (Australia) Andrew Florent
6
3
4

3
- (Czech Republic) Petr Korda
- (Czech Republic) Cyril Suk
4
6
6

3
- (Czech Republic) Petr Korda
- (Czech Republic) Cyril Suk
6
6
4

6
- (United States) Jim Grabb
- (United States) Richey Reneberg
7
4
6

6
- (United States) Jim Grabb
- (United States) Richey Reneberg
6
7

- (United States) Donald Johnson
- (United States) Francisco Montana
3
6

=== Top half ===
First round

Second round

Quarterfinals

Semifinals

1
- (The Bahamas) M Knowles
- (Canada) D Nestor
6
3
5

- (Australia) J Eagle
- (Australia) A Florent
7
7

- (Australia) J Eagle
- (Australia) A Florent
4
6
7

WC
- (United States) B Shelton
- (United States) T Witsken
5
5

- (Australia) J Eagle
- (Australia) A Florent
5
6
6

- (United States) D Flach
- (United States) C Woodruff
3
6
6

7
- (Czech Republic) M Damm
- (Sweden) P Nyborg
7
4
2

WC
- (Sweden) T Enqvist
- (Sweden) T Johansson
6
3
2

- (United States) D Flach
- (United States) C Woodruff
6
6

Q
- (Italy) R Furlan
- (Italy) S Pescosolido
6
4

7
- (Czech Republic) M Damm
- (Sweden) P Nyborg
7
7

7
- (Czech Republic) M Damm
- (Sweden) P Nyborg
7
6

- (Australia) J Eagle
- (Australia) A Florent
6
3
4

3
- (Czech Republic) P Korda
- (Czech Republic) C Suk
4
6
6

3
- (Czech Republic) P Korda
- (Czech Republic) C Suk
6
7

WC
- (United States) J Gimelstob
- (United States) J Salzenstein
5
2

- (South Africa) L Bale
- (South Africa) M Ondruska
2
5

- (South Africa) L Bale
- (South Africa) M Ondruska
7
6

3
- (Czech Republic) P Korda
- (Czech Republic) C Suk
4
7
6

- (United States) K Jones
- (United States) M Lucena
6
3
4

- (Croatia) S Hiršzon
- (Croatia) G Ivanišević
6
6
3

- (Croatia) S Hiršzon
- (Croatia) G Ivanišević
3
6
6

- (Croatia) S Hiršzon
- (Croatia) G Ivanišević
7
4
6

- (Sweden) R Bergh
- (United States) J Waite
3
7
2

5
- (United States) T Kronemann
- (Australia) D Macpherson
6
6
3

5
- (United States) T Kronemann
- (Australia) D Macpherson
6
5
6

=== Bottom half ===
First round

Second round

Quarterfinals

Semifinals

6
- (United States) J Grabb
- (United States) R Reneberg
3
7
6

- (South Africa) B Haygarth
- (Australia) P Kilderry
6
6
3

6
- (United States) J Grabb
- (United States) R Reneberg
6
6

- (United Kingdom) T Henman
- (France) G Raoux
6
7

- (United Kingdom) T Henman
- (France) G Raoux
4
2

- (United States) S Davis
- (United States) T Martin
3
6

6
- (United States) J Grabb
- (United States) R Reneberg
6
7

- (United States) K Kinnear
- (United States) D Randall
4
7
2

4
- (Argentina) J Frana
- (United States) R Leach
0
5

- (United States) K Flach
- (United States) D Wheaton
6
6
6

- (United States) K Flach
- (United States) D Wheaton
7
6
3

4
- (Argentina) J Frana
- (United States) R Leach
6
7
6

6
- (United States) J Grabb
- (United States) R Reneberg
6
7

8
- (United States) B MacPhie
- (Australia) M Tebbutt
4
2

- (United States) D Johnson
- (United States) F Montana
3
6

- (United States) D Johnson
- (United States) F Montana
6
6

- (United States) D Johnson
- (United States) F Montana
6
7
6

- (United Kingdom) M Petchey
- (United States) K Thorne
4
6
6

- (Spain) À Corretja
- (Switzerland) J Hlasek
7
6
3

- (Spain) À Corretja
- (Switzerland) J Hlasek
6
3
7

- (United States) D Johnson
- (United States) F Montana
6
6
6

WC
- (United States) B Bryan
- (United States) M Bryan
2
4

2
- (Canada) S Lareau
- (United States) J Stark
4
7
3

Q
- (South Africa) N Godwin
- (South Africa) G Stafford
6
6

Q
- (South Africa) N Godwin
- (South Africa) G Stafford
3
2

2
- (Canada) S Lareau
- (United States) J Stark
6
6
