= 2000 RCA Championships =

- Date: August 14–20
- Edition: 13th
- Category: International Series Gold
- Draw: 64S/32D
- Prize money: $700,000
- Surface: Hard / outdoor
- Location: Indianapolis, U.S.
- Venue: Indianapolis Tennis Center

Champions

Singles
- (Brazil) Gustavo Kuerten

Doubles
- (Australia) Lleyton Hewitt / (Australia) Sandon Stolle
- Indianapolis Tennis Championships

The 2000 RCA Championships was a tennis tournament played on outdoor hard courts. It was the 13th edition of the event known that year as the RCA Championships, and was part of the International Series Gold of the 2000 ATP Tour. It took place at the Indianapolis Tennis Center in Indianapolis, Indiana, United States, from August 14 through August 20, 2000.

The singles draw featured ATP No. 2, French Open titlist, Hamburg and Santiago champion, Miami and Rome runner-up Gustavo Kuerten, Australian Open runner-up Yevgeny Kafelnikov, and Barcelona, Majorca and Toronto winner, Hamburg finalist Marat Safin. Other top seeds competing included Cincinnati winner Thomas Enqvist, Adelaide, Sydney, Scottsdale and Queen's Club champion Lleyton Hewitt, Tim Henman, Nicolás Lapentti and Marcelo Ríos.

== Finals ==
=== Singles ===
(Brazil) Gustavo Kuerten defeated (Russia) Marat Safin 3–6, 7–6^{(7–2)}, 7–6^{(7–2)}

- It was Gustavo Kuerten's 4th title of the year, and his 9th overall.

=== Doubles ===
(Australia) Lleyton Hewitt / (Australia) Sandon Stolle defeated (Sweden) Jonas Björkman / (Belarus) Max Mirnyi 6–2, 3–6, 6–3
