= 2001 RCA Championships – Singles =

Singles
- 2001 RCA Championships

Final
- Champion: (Australia) Patrick Rafter
- Runner-up: (Brazil) Gustavo Kuerten
- Score: 4–2 (Kuerten retired)

Details
- Draw: 56
- Seeds: 16

Events
Singles	Doubles
- RCA Championships

Gustavo Kuerten was the defending champion but was forced to retire in the final losing 4–2 against Patrick Rafter.

== Seeds ==
The top eight seeds received a bye to the second round.

1. (Brazil) Gustavo Kuerten (final, retired because of right side muscle pull)
2. (Russia) Marat Safin (semifinals)
3. (Australia) Lleyton Hewitt (third round)
4. (Russia) Yevgeny Kafelnikov (second round)
5. (Australia) Patrick Rafter (champion)
6. (United Kingdom) Tim Henman (quarterfinals)
7. (France) Arnaud Clément (third round)
8. (Sweden) Thomas Enqvist (quarterfinals)
9. (Sweden) Thomas Johansson (third round)
10. (Croatia) Goran Ivanišević (semifinals)
11. (Romania) Andrei Pavel (second round)
12. (United States) ~~Todd Martin~~ (withdrew because of a bruised knee)
13. (Morocco) Hicham Arazi (second round)
14. (France) Nicolas Escudé (second round)
15. (South Africa) Wayne Ferreira (first round)
16. (Spain) Tommy Robredo (third round)

== Draw ==
Key

- Q = Qualifier
- WC = Wild card
- LL = Lucky loser
- Alt = Alternate
- ITF = ITF entry
- PR = Protected ranking
- SR = Special ranking
- SE = Special exempt
- JE = Junior exempt
- JR = Junior Accelerator Programme entrant
- CO = College Accelerator Programme entrant
- NG = Next Gen Accelerator Program entrant
- w/o = Walkover
- r = Retired
- d = Defaulted

=== Finals ===
Semifinals
1	(Brazil) Gustavo Kuerten	1	6	6
WC/10	(Croatia) Goran Ivanišević	6	3	2
5	(Australia) Patrick Rafter	6	5	7^{9}
2	(Russia) Marat Safin	3	7	6^{7}

Final
1	(Brazil) Gustavo Kuerten	2^{r}
5	(Australia) Patrick Rafter	4

=== Top half ===
==== Section 1 ====
First round
Q	(Israel) N Okun	6	6
Q	(Czech Republic) R Štěpánek	4	3
(United States) C Woodruff	6	7^{7}
(France) A Di Pasquale	2	6^{5}
(Croatia) I Ljubičić	4	7^{7}	7^{7}
15	(South Africa) W Ferreira	6	6^{4}	6^{3}
LL	(France) C Saulnier	4	2
Q	(United States) K Kim	6	6
Q	(Czech Republic) L Friedl	4	7^{7}	3
(Argentina) M Zabaleta	6	6^{5}	6
(Romania) A Voinea	7^{8}	6
(Canada) S Lareau	6^{6}	1

Second round
1	(Brazil) G Kuerten	6	6
Q	(Israel) N Okun	4	3
(United States) C Woodruff	3	6^{15}
(Croatia) I Ljubičić	6	7^{17}
Q	(United States) K Kim	6	2	5
(Argentina) M Zabaleta	4	6	7
(Romania) A Voinea	2	3
6	(United Kingdom) T Henman	6	6

Third round
1	(Brazil) G Kuerten	7^{7}	7
(Croatia) I Ljubičić	6^{5}	5
(Argentina) M Zabaleta	2	1
6	(United Kingdom) T Henman	6	6

Quarterfinals
1	(Brazil) G Kuerten	3	6	7
6	(United Kingdom) T Henman	6	1	5

==== Section 2 ====
First round
WC	(United States) T Dent	7^{7}	2	6
(Switzerland) M Kratochvil	6^{4}	6	4
(Morocco) Y El Aynaoui	6	6
Q	(United States) V Spadea	4	4
WC	(United States) J Blake	3	3
14	(France) N Escudé	6	6
WC/10	(Croatia) G Ivanišević	6	6
(Brazil) F Meligeni	4	4
(Belarus) V Voltchkov	7^{7}	3	6
Q	(United States) G Weiner	6^{4}	6	0
(Morocco) K Alami	1	7	4
WC	(United States) R Ginepri	6	5	6

Second round
3	(Australia) L Hewitt	6	7^{7}
WC	(United States) T Dent	2	6^{3}
(Morocco) Y El Aynaoui	3	7^{7}	6
14	(France) N Escudé	6	6^{3}	3
WC/10	(Croatia) G Ivanišević	4	7^{7}	7^{7}
(Belarus) V Voltchkov	6	6^{4}	6^{1}
WC	(United States) R Ginepri	3	4
7	(France) A Clément	6	6

Third round
3	(Australia) L Hewitt	3	7^{7}	3
(Morocco) Y El Aynaoui	6	6^{1}	6
WC/10	(Croatia) G Ivanišević	7	7
7	(France) A Clément	5	5

Quarterfinals
(Morocco) Y El Aynaoui	5	3
WC/10	(Croatia) G Ivanišević	7	6

=== Bottom half ===
==== Section 3 ====
First round
(Switzerland) G Bastl	4	1
(Czech Republic) M Tabara	6	6
(Denmark) K Pless	6	6
(France) C Pioline	3	4
WC	(United States) M Fish	4	7	1
11	(Romania) A Pavel	6	5	6
13	(Morocco) H Arazi	7^{7}	6
Q	(Czech Republic) O Fukárek	6^{5}	2
(Sweden) J Björkman	7^{12}	7
(Czech Republic) C Doseděl	6^{10}	5
(Belarus) M Mirnyi	6	6
(Australia) A Ilie	4	4

Second round
5	(Australia) P Rafter	6	6
(Czech Republic) M Tabara	2	0
(Denmark) K Pless	7^{8}	3	6
11	(Romania) A Pavel	6^{6}	6	3
13	(Morocco) H Arazi	1	4
(Sweden) J Björkman	6	6
(Belarus) M Mirnyi	6	6
4	(Russia) Y Kafelnikov	3	3

Third round
5	(Australia) P Rafter	6	6
(Denmark) K Pless	4	4
(Sweden) J Björkman	6	3	6^{12}
(Belarus) M Mirnyi	3	6	7^{14}

Quarterfinals
5	(Australia) P Rafter	6	7^{7}
(Belarus) M Mirnyi	3	6^{3}

==== Section 4 ====
First round
(Germany) A Popp	7	6
(Czech Republic) J Vaněk	5	1
(Brazil) A Simoni	2	3
(Belgium) X Malisse	6	6
(Israel) H Levy	3	3
9	(Sweden) T Johansson	6	6
16	(Spain) T Robredo	7	6
(Austria) S Koubek	5	1
(United States) M Russell	6	6
(Armenia) S Sargsian	2	4
(Brazil) A Sá	6	6^{8}	6
(Sweden) M Larsson	2	7^{10}	3

Second round
8	(Sweden) T Enqvist	7^{7}	3	6
(Germany) A Popp	6^{2}	6	4
(Belgium) X Malisse	6	1	4
9	(Sweden) T Johansson	3	6	6
16	(Spain) T Robredo	6	7
(United States) M Russell	3	5
(Brazil) A Sá	6	2	3
2	(Russia) M Safin	4	6	6

Third round
8	(Sweden) T Enqvist	6	5	6
9	(Sweden) T Johansson	2	7	1
16	(Spain) T Robredo	6^{5}	1
2	(Russia) M Safin	7^{7}	6

Quarterfinals
8	(Sweden) T Enqvist	5	4
2	(Russia) M Safin	7	6
