= 1997 RCA Championships =

- Date: August 11–17
- Edition: 10th
- Category: Championship Series
- Draw: 56S / 32D
- Prize money: $915,000
- Surface: Hard / outdoor
- Location: Indianapolis, Indiana, U.S.
- Venue: Indianapolis Tennis Center

Champions

Singles
- (Sweden) Jonas Björkman

Doubles
- (Australia) Michael Tebbutt / (Sweden) Mikael Tillström
- Indianapolis Tennis Championships

The 1997 RCA Championships was a men's tennis tournament played on outdoor hard courts. It was the 10th edition of the event known that year as the RCA Championships, and was part of the International Series of the 1997 ATP Tour. It took place at the Indianapolis Tennis Center in Indianapolis, Indiana, United States. Ninth-seeded Jonas Björkman won the singles title.

== Finals ==
=== Singles ===
(Sweden) Jonas Björkman defeated (Spain) Carlos Moyà 6–3, 7–6

- It was Björkman's 2nd singles title of the year and of his career.

=== Doubles ===
(Australia) Michael Tebbutt / (Sweden) Mikael Tillström defeated (Sweden) Jonas Björkman / (Sweden) Nicklas Kulti 6–3, 6–2
