= 1999 RCA Championships – Doubles =

Doubles
- 1999 RCA Championships

Final
- Champions: (Netherlands) Paul Haarhuis (United States) Jared Palmer
- Runners-up: (France) Olivier Delaître (India) Leander Paes
- Score: 6–3, 6–4

Events
Singles	Doubles
- Indianapolis Tennis Championships

Jiří Novák and David Rikl were the defending champions, but lost in first round to Lan Bale and Grant Stafford.

Paul Haarhuis and Jared Palmer won the title by defeating Olivier Delaître and Leander Paes 6–3, 6–4 in the final.

== Seeds ==
All four seeds received a bye into the second round.

1. (France) Olivier Delaître / (India) Leander Paes (final)
2. (Netherlands) Paul Haarhuis / (United States) Jared Palmer (champions)
3. (The Bahamas) Mark Knowles / (Canada) Daniel Nestor (semifinals)
4. (Australia) Todd Woodbridge / (Australia) Mark Woodforde (semifinals)
5. (South Africa) Ellis Ferreira / (United States) Rick Leach (quarterfinals)
6. (Sweden) Jonas Björkman / (South Africa) Wayne Ferreira (first round)
7. (Czech Republic) Jiří Novák / (Czech Republic) David Rikl (first round)
8. (Belarus) Max Mirnyi / (Czech Republic) Daniel Vacek (first round)

== Draw ==
Key

- Q = Qualifier
- WC = Wild card
- LL = Lucky loser
- Alt = Alternate
- ITF = ITF entry
- PR = Protected ranking
- SR = Special ranking
- SE = Special exempt
- JE = Junior exempt
- JR = Junior Accelerator Programme entrant
- CO = College Accelerator Programme entrant
- NG = Next Gen Accelerator Program entrant
- w/o = Walkover
- r = Retired
- d = Defaulted

=== Finals ===
Semifinals
1	(France) Olivier Delaître (India) Leander Paes	6	6
4	(Australia) Todd Woodbridge (Australia) Mark Woodforde	4	4
3	(The Bahamas) Mark Knowles (Canada) Daniel Nestor	4	6^{0}
2	(Netherlands) Paul Haarhuis (United States) Jared Palmer	6	7^{7}

Final
1	(France) Olivier Delaître (India) Leander Paes	3	4
2	(Netherlands) Paul Haarhuis (United States) Jared Palmer	6	6

=== Top half ===
First round
(India) M Bhupathi (Romania) A Pavel	6	3	6
Q	(Spain) Ó Burrieza López (Argentina) G Cañas	3	6	3
(United Kingdom) N Broad (Australia) P Tramacchi	6	6
(Brazil) F Meligeni (Argentina) D Orsanic	2	1
(Argentina) P Albano (Croatia) G Ivanišević	6	7^{9}
8	(Belarus) M Mirnyi (Czech Republic) D Vacek	4	6^{7}
(Netherlands) S Schalken (Netherlands) J Siemerink	3	4
(United States) B Bryan (United States) M Bryan	6	6
(North Macedonia) A Kitinov (United States) J Waite	7^{7}	6
WC	(United States) R Reneberg (United States) C Woodruff	6^{2}	2
(South Africa) B Haygarth (Australia) M Tebbutt	2	6^{8}
5	(South Africa) E Ferreira (United States) R Leach	6	7^{10}

Second round
1	(France) O Delaître (India) L Paes	6	2	6
(India) M Bhupathi (Romania) A Pavel	4	6	3
(United Kingdom) N Broad (Australia) P Tramacchi	4	7^{8}	7^{15}
(Argentina) P Albano (Croatia) G Ivanišević	6	6^{6}	6^{13}
4	(Australia) T Woodbridge (Australia) M Woodforde	6	3	7^{7}
(United States) B Bryan (United States) M Bryan	4	6	6^{5}
(North Macedonia) A Kitinov (United States) J Waite	3	1
5	(South Africa) E Ferreira (United States) R Leach	6	6

Quarterfinals
1	(France) O Delaître (India) L Paes	6	1	6
(United Kingdom) N Broad (Australia) P Tramacchi	4	6	3
4	(Australia) T Woodbridge (Australia) M Woodforde	6^{4}	6	7
5	(South Africa) E Ferreira (United States) R Leach	7^{7}	1	5

Semifinals
1	(France) O Delaître (India) L Paes	6	6
4	(Australia) T Woodbridge (Australia) M Woodforde	4	4

=== Bottom half ===
First round
6	(Sweden) J Björkman (South Africa) W Ferreira	4	4
(United States) J Grabb (United States) J Stark	6	6
Q	(Sweden) M Larsson (Sweden) M Norman	3	4
(Australia) A Florent (Australia) D Macpherson	6	6
WC	(Sweden) T Enqvist (Sweden) T Johansson	3	2
(Russia) A Olhovskiy (Germany) D Prinosil	6	6
7	(Czech Republic) J Novák (Czech Republic) D Rikl	2	6^{4}
(South Africa) L Bale (South Africa) G Stafford	6	7^{7}
(Spain) A Martín (Argentina) M Rodríguez	6^{3}	4
(South Africa) C Haggard (Sweden) P Nyborg	7^{7}	6
(United States) D Wheaton (United States) Rick Witsken	1	6	5
(Australia) A Ilie (Spain) C Moyá	6	3	7

Second round
(United States) J Grabb (United States) J Stark	6	6
(Australia) A Florent (Australia) D Macpherson	4	4
(Russia) A Olhovskiy (Germany) D Prinosil	6	1	3
3	(The Bahamas) M Knowles (Canada) D Nestor	2	6	6
(South Africa) L Bale (South Africa) G Stafford	6	4	6
(South Africa) C Haggard (Sweden) P Nyborg	4	6	3
(Australia) A Ilie (Spain) C Moyá	4	3
2	(Netherlands) P Haarhuis (United States) J Palmer	6	6

Quarterfinals
(United States) J Grabb (United States) J Stark	3	4
3	(The Bahamas) M Knowles (Canada) D Nestor	6	6
(South Africa) L Bale (South Africa) G Stafford	1	5
2	(Netherlands) P Haarhuis (United States) J Palmer	6	7

Semifinals
3	(The Bahamas) M Knowles (Canada) D Nestor	4	6^{0}
2	(Netherlands) P Haarhuis (United States) J Palmer	6	7^{7}
