= Pete Sampras =

American former tennis player (born 1971)

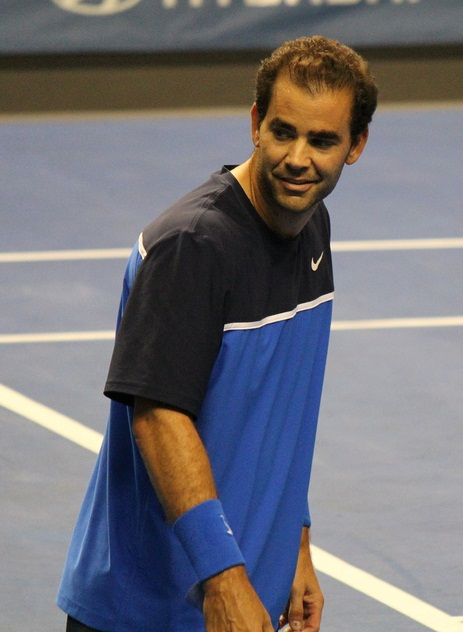
- Sampras in 2011
- Full name: Petros Sampras
- Country (sports): United States
- Residence: Lake Sherwood, California, US
- Born: August 12, 1971 (age 55) Washington, D.C., US
- Height: 6 ft 1 in (1.85 m)
- Turned pro: 1988
- Retired: September 8, 2002 (last match); August 25, 2003 (official)
- Plays: Right-handed (one-handed backhand)
- Coach: Peter Fischer (1980–1989); Joe Brandi (1989–1991); Tim Gullikson (1992–1995); Vitas Gerulaitis (1994 Rome); Paul Annacone (1995–2001); Tom Gullikson (2001–2002); José Higueras (2002); Paul Annacone (2002)
- Prize money: US$43,280,489: 9th all-time in earnings
- Int. Tennis HoF: 2007 (member page)

Singles
- Career record: 762–222 (77.4%)
- Career titles: 64 (9th in the Open Era)
- Highest ranking: No. 1 (April 12, 1993)

Grand Slam singles results
- Australian Open: W (1994, 1997)
- French Open: SF (1996)
- Wimbledon: W (1993, 1994, 1995, 1997, 1998, 1999, 2000)
- US Open: W (1990, 1993, 1995, 1996, 2002)

Other tournaments
- Tour Finals: W (1991, 1994, 1996, 1997, 1999)
- Grand Slam Cup: W (1990, 1997)
- Olympic Games: 3R (1992)

Doubles
- Career record: 64–70 (47.8%)
- Career titles: 2
- Highest ranking: No. 27 (February 12, 1990)

Grand Slam doubles results
- Australian Open: 2R (1989)
- French Open: 2R (1989)
- Wimbledon: 3R (1989)
- US Open: 1R (1988, 1989, 1990)

Team competitions
- Davis Cup: W (1992, 1995)

Pete Sampras (born August 12, 1971) is an American former professional tennis player. One of the most successful tennis players of all time, he was ranked as the world No. 1 in men's singles by the Association of Tennis Professionals (ATP) for 286 weeks (third-most of all time), and finished as the year-end No. 1 six consecutive times. Sampras won 64 ATP Tour-level singles titles, including 14 men's singles majors, which was an all-time record at the time of his retirement: seven Wimbledon Championships, two Australian Opens and an Open Era joint-record five US Opens. He also won five Tour Finals, two Grand Slam Cups, eleven Masters events, and was part of the winning United States Davis Cup teams in 1992 and 1995.

Sampras became the youngest male singles champion at the 1990 US Open at just 19 years, 28 days. He claimed his first Wimbledon title in 1993, and would win the title seven times in an eight-year span. Sampras remained the best player for the rest of the decade, finishing each year as No. 1 for a record six consecutive seasons. Following a decline in form at the turn of the century, Sampras claimed his 14th and last major at the 2002 US Open over long-time rival and compatriot Andre Agassi, and retired from the sport thereafter, aged 31.

Sampras was a major practitioner of the serve-and-volley style of tennis. His precise and powerful serve, regarded as one of the best in the sport's history, earned him the nickname "Pistol Pete". In 2007, he was inducted into the International Tennis Hall of Fame.

== Early life ==
Petros "Pete" Sampras was born on August 12, 1971, in Washington, D.C. He is the third child of Soterios "Sammy" and Georgia (née Vroustouris) Sampras. His father was born in the United States to a Greek father, Costas "Gus" Sampras, and a Polish-Jewish mother, Sarah Steinberg who, when she was 19, immigrated to the United States from the village of Sellasia in Sparta. Sampras attended regular services of the Greek Orthodox Church on Sundays. At the age of 3, he discovered a tennis racket in the basement of his home and spent hours hitting balls against the wall.

In 1978, the Sampras family moved to Palos Verdes, California, and the warmer climate there allowed the seven year-old Sampras to play tennis for most of the year. From early on, his great idol was Rod Laver, and at the age of 11, Sampras met and played tennis with the legend. The Sampras family joined the Jack Kramer Club, and it was here that Sampras's talent became apparent. As a teenager, Sampras trained with tennis coach Robert Lansdorp. The forehand he learned from Lansdorp was the same forehand he used throughout his career. The key was an emphasis on driving through the ball and not hitting extreme topspin. He was spotted by Dr. Peter Fischer, a pediatrician and tennis enthusiast, who coached Sampras until 1989. Fischer was responsible for converting Sampras's double-handed backhand to single-hand with the goal of being better prepared to win Wimbledon.

== Professional career ==
=== 1988: Turning professional ===
Sampras turned professional in 1988, at the age of 16, and finished the year ranked world No. 97 after starting the year at No. 893. His first professional match was a loss to Sammy Giammalva Jr. at the February Ebel U.S. Pro Indoor in Philadelphia. However, just one week later, at the Lipton International Players Championships in Miami, Sampras defeated two top-40 players, before losing to No. 18 Emilio Sánchez. He did not defeat another top-40 player for almost six months, at which point he defeated No. 39 Michiel Schapers at a US Open warm-up tournament in Rye Brook, New York. In his first Grand Slam singles match, Sampras lost to No. 69 Jaime Yzaga of Peru in the first round of the US Open. Sampras did not advance past the quarterfinals in his next three tournaments, although he did record wins over No. 79 Jim Courier in their first career match-up, along with defeating No. 8 Tim Mayotte.

=== 1989: First major match wins ===
The following year, Sampras slightly improved his ranking to a year-ending No. 81. He lost in the first round of the 1989 Australian Open to Christian Saceanu and, at that year's French Open, won a Grand Slam singles match for the first time in his career; in the second round he lost to eventual champion and fellow American teenager Michael Chang in their first career match-up. A few weeks later, Sampras lost in the first round of Wimbledon to Todd Woodbridge. At the US Open, Sampras defeated defending champion and fifth-seeded Mats Wilander in the second round before losing to No. 13 Jay Berger in the fourth round. To end the year, Sampras lost in the first round in four consecutive tournaments.

=== 1990: US Open champion ===
At the Australian Open, Sampras upset twelfth-ranked Tim Mayotte in the first round before losing to thirteenth-ranked Yannick Noah in the fourth round in four sets. His first professional singles title came in February at the Ebel U.S. Pro Indoor in Philadelphia, where he defeated sixth-ranked Andre Agassi, eighth-ranked Mayotte, and eighteenth-ranked Andrés Gómez in the final. This title elevated his ranking into the top 20 for the first time. Sampras finished 1990 at No. 5, having started the year ranked No. 61 just prior to the start of the Australian Open.

Sampras did not play in the 1990 French Open and lost in the first round of Wimbledon to Christo van Rensburg. Sampras played seven consecutive weeks during the North American summer hard-court season. He defeated John McEnroe in the quarterfinals of the Canadian Open, but then lost to Chang in the semifinals. He also reached the semifinals of the tournament in Los Angeles, where he lost to No. 2 Stefan Edberg. He did not advance past the quarterfinals in his next three tournaments, losing to Chang, Richey Reneberg, and Goran Ivanišević.

In September, Sampras captured his first Grand Slam title, at the US Open. Along the way, he defeated sixth-ranked Thomas Muster in the fourth round and third-ranked Ivan Lendl in a five-set quarterfinal, breaking Lendl's streak of eight consecutive US Open finals. He then defeated 20th-ranked McEnroe in a four-set semifinal to set up a final with fourth-ranked Agassi. Sampras beat Agassi in straight sets to become the US Open's youngest-ever male singles champion at the age of 19 years and 28 days. He played five more tournaments and won the Grand Slam Cup to complete his year.

=== 1991: Year-end title ===
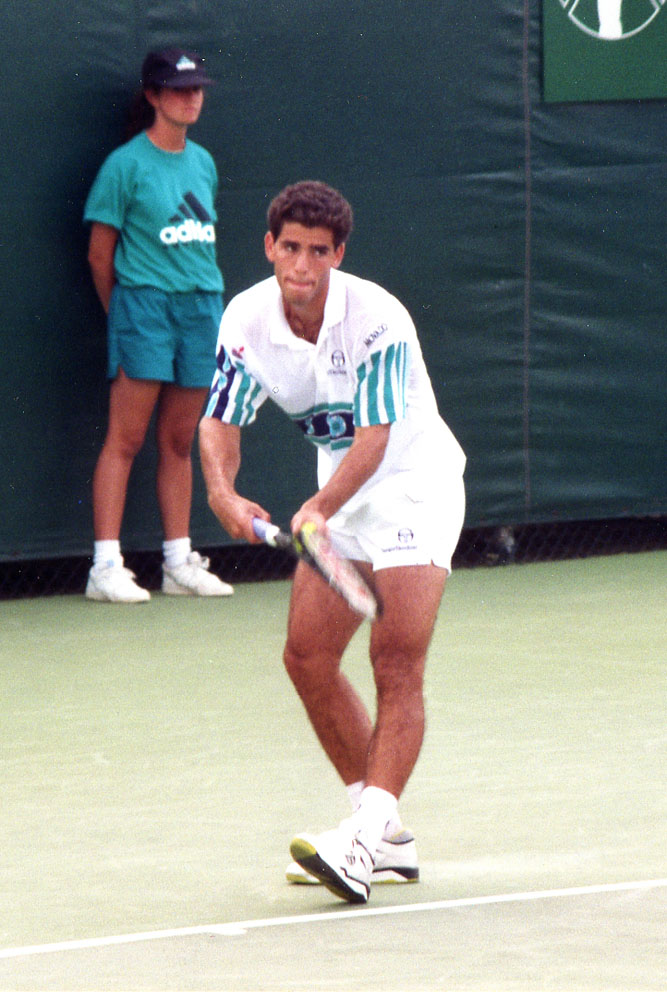
Sampras in 1992

Sampras lost in the second round of the French Open (to Thierry Champion) and played "very inconsistently" in losing a second round match to Derrick Rostagno at Wimbledon. Upon entering the US Open as the defending champion that year, he caused controversy when, after losing in the quarterfinals to Jim Courier, Sampras said that he was not disappointed and felt relieved that the pressure to defend his title was no longer on him. This led to widespread criticism, which included disparaging remarks from Courier and Jimmy Connors. Sampras captured the first of his five career titles at the year-end Tennis Masters Cup.

=== 1992: First Masters title ===
Sampras reached the quarterfinals of the French Open for the first time, losing to Andre Agassi in straight sets. He made it to the Wimbledon semifinals, losing a serve dominated four set match to Goran Ivanisevic. He won at Cincinnati beating Ivan Lendl in the final. He was the runner-up at the US Open to Stefan Edberg. Sampras later stated that his loss in the US Open final that year was a "wake-up call" and that he needed to figure out how to become the world No. 1. He also played doubles with John McEnroe on the US team that won the Davis Cup on home soil, beating Switzerland 3–1.

1992 was also the year when Sampras made his only competitive appearance at the Olympics. The event was played on clay, his worst surface. Nonetheless, Sampras advanced to the third round before giving up a two-set lead and losing to Andrei Cherkasov of Russia.

=== 1993: Two major titles, world No. 1 ===
Sampras reached the semifinals of the Australian Open in January, losing again to Stefan Edberg. In April, Sampras attained the No. 1 ranking for the first time. His rise to the top of the rankings was controversial because he had not recently won any Grand Slam titles. A few days after becoming world number one, Sampras beat world number two Jim Courier in the final at Hong Kong on a final set tie break, serving 15 aces. Sampras allowed Sergi Bruguera to dictate play from the baseline and lost in four sets in the French Open quarter finals. He consolidated his number one ranking in July by claiming his first of seven Wimbledon titles, beating former world No. 1 and fellow American Jim Courier in the final. This was followed by his second US Open title, where he beat Cedric Pioline in the final (Pioline made 45 unforced errors during the three set match). Sampras finished the year as the clear No. 1 and set a new ATP Tour record that year by becoming the first player to serve more than 1,000 aces in a season.

=== 1994: Australian and Wimbledon titles ===
Sampras won the first of two Australian Open titles in 1994, defeating American Todd Martin in the final. Sampras was suffering from a stomach ailment as the start of the Key Biscayne final was delayed. Andre Agassi was offered a walkover but declined. Sampras recovered and served 7 aces in his final two service games to win in three sets. Sampras allowed Boris Becker a total of five games in three sets in the Italian Open final and entered the French Open trying to win his fourth consecutive Grand Slam. Sampras failed to become the first man since Rod Laver to win four consecutive Grand Slam titles, losing to Jim Courier in the quarters. Courier's ranking was falling and Sampras had won his previous four matches against him but the clay surface "neutralized Sampras' serve". Sampras then defended his Wimbledon in July, beating Ivanisevic in the final. Criticisms were made about the length of the points, as only three rallies contained more than five shots. Sampras was suffering from fatigue and lost in five sets to Jaime Yzaga in the fourth round of the US Open.

=== 1995: Wimbledon and US titles, world No. 1 ===
In 1995, Sampras battled for the world No. 1 ranking with compatriot Andre Agassi. Sampras experienced one of the most emotional matches of his career against Courier in the quarterfinals of the Australian Open. Sampras' longtime coach and close friend, Tim Gullikson, had mysteriously collapsed during the tournament and was forced to return to the United States. Gullikson was later diagnosed with brain cancer, to which he succumbed the following year. Saddened by Gullikson's illness, Sampras began visibly weeping during the match when a spectator shouted at Sampras, urging him to win it for Gullikson. Sampras nevertheless managed to defeat Courier, but lost the final to Andre Agassi in four sets. Paul Annacone took over as Sampras' full-time coach after Gullikson's illness made it impossible for him to continue coaching.

Sampras defeated Agassi in the final at Indian Wells and lost to him in the Key Biscayne final on a final set tie break. At the French Open, Sampras lost in five sets in round one to Gilbert Schaller, making 99 unforced errors. He then won his third straight Wimbledon title over Boris Becker in a four set final in which he served 23 aces and didn't face a break point. "Unfortunately, he owns the Centre Court now. I used to own it a few years back, but it belongs to him now" said Becker afterwards. Sampras lost in the final of the Canadian Masters to Agassi. Sampras faced Agassi in the final of the US Open. Agassi "knew Sampras would have to play excellent tennis to beat him. And he knew that Sampras had done exactly that." Sampras served 24 aces during his four set victory.

Sampras was the key figure for champion United States in the Davis Cup, beating Russia in the final in Moscow, 3–2. Sampras was included in all of the three wins. After the opening match (a 5-set thriller against Chesnokov) Sampras was so exhausted that he collapsed and needed help to get into the locker room. Sampras was undefeated in Davis Cup singles in 1995 with six wins and no losses.

=== 1996: Only Wimbledon loss over eight years ===
In the year's first major, the Australian Open, the top-seeded Sampras lost to the unseeded Mark Philippoussis in straight sets in the third round. Sampras had what would end up being his best run ever at that year's French Open, defeating two past former champions Sergi Bruguera and Jim Courier (in 5 sets on both occasions and overcoming a 2–0 deficit against the latter) before losing in a semifinal match to the eventual winner, Yevgeny Kafelnikov in straight sets.

In the eight Wimbledons inclusive between 1993 and 2000, 1996 was the only year that Sampras would fail to win the tournament. Sampras lost in the quarterfinals that year to the 17th-seed and eventual champion Richard Krajicek, who defeated Sampras in straight sets.

In the quarterfinals of the US Open, Sampras vomited on the court at 1–1 in the final set tiebreak (due to dehydration) while facing Àlex Corretja. At 7–6 in the tie break Corretja had match point, but Sampras saved it with a lunge volley and went on to win. Sampras advanced to the finals, where he defeated No. 2 Michael Chang in straight sets to defend his US Open title.

Sampras finished off the year by claiming the season-ending ATP Tour World Championship for the third time in his career beating Boris Becker in five sets in a match which Sampras said was "one of the best matches I have ever been part of".

=== 1997: Australian and Wimbledon titles ===
In January in the fourth round of the Australian Open on a scorching hot day, Sampras was 4–2 down in the fifth set and a point away from going a double break down against Dominik Hrbatý, before winning the fifth set. He went on to beat Carlos Moyá in the final. In July, he won Wimbledon for the fourth time, defeating Cédric Pioline in the final. Sampras also won singles titles in San Jose, Philadelphia, Cincinnati, Munich, and Paris, and the ATP Tour World Championships in Hanover, Germany. He became the only player to win both the Grand Slam Cup and the ATP Tour World Championships in the same year. Sampras lost in the fourth round of the US Open to Petr Korda on a fifth set tie break, despite leading 3–0 in the final set.

He had a 10–1 win–loss record against top-10 opponents and was undefeated in eight singles finals. He held the No. 1 ranking for the entire year and joined Jimmy Connors (1974–1978) as the only male players to hold the year-end No. 1 ranking for five consecutive years. His prize money earnings of US$6,498,211 for the year was a career high.

=== 1998: Wimbledon title, six straight years No. 1 ===
In 1998, Sampras's No. 1 ranking was challenged by Chilean player Marcelo Ríos. Sampras failed to defend his Australian Open title, losing in the quarterfinals to Karol Kučera, and won Wimbledon only after a hard-fought five-set victory in the final over Goran Ivanišević. This was Sampras's only Grand Slam final which went to five sets.

Sampras lost in the final of the Cincinnati Masters to Patrick Rafter. Sampras faced Rafter again in the semifinals of the US Open, losing in five sets after sustaining injury while leading the match two sets to one, and Rafter went on to win his second consecutive US Open title. Sampras lost another semifinal at the Tennis Masters Cup to eventual champion Àlex Corretja. Nevertheless, Sampras finished the year as the top-ranked player for the sixth year in a row.

=== 1999: Wimbledon title ===
The year started with a withdrawal from the Australian Open due to fatigue, and Sampras failed to win a title during the early part of the season. However, he then went on a 24-match winning streak encompassing the Stella Artois Championships, Wimbledon (equaling Roy Emerson's record of 12 Grand Slam singles titles), Los Angeles, and Cincinnati (a rematch of the previous year's final with Patrick Rafter). Sampras' straight sets victory over Andre Agassi in the Wimbledon final is often cited as one of the greatest performances in a Wimbledon final. Despite this—on account of a herniated disc in his back forcing retirement at the RCA Championships and withdrawal from the US Open—he lost his no. 1 ranking to Agassi the following day, when the ATP Tour rankings were updated.

Sampras' ranking was hurt by a combination of withdrawing from the Australian and US Opens, tournaments in which he had strong performances during the previous year, and the resurgence of longtime rival Agassi, putting an end to Sampras' six consecutive years of finishing as world No. 1. Agassi took over the top ranking and held it for the rest of the season, but Sampras recovered and managed to beat Agassi in the year-end championships for the fifth and final time, enabling him to remain third in the rankings.

=== 2000: 13 majors and return to No. 1 ===
Sampras reached the semifinals of the Australian Open in early 2000, falling to the eventual champion Agassi in a five-set match. He won the Ericsson Open for the third time in March. After getting knocked out in the first round at the French Open, he won his seventh and final title at Wimbledon, battling through tendinitis in his right shin and a painful back injury in the process equalling the then all time gentleman's singles title record of William Renshaw. In the final, Sampras was a set down and 4–1 down in the second set tie break against Patrick Rafter, but went on to win in four sets. This was his 13th Grand Slam singles title, breaking the all-time record of Roy Emerson that had stood for over 30 years. The 2000 Wimbledon final was the first of Sampras' matches in his ATP career that his parents ever attended in person, due to nervousness watching him play.

In the 2000 US Open, Sampras overcame Richard Krajicek in four sets at the quarterfinals (including a comeback from 2–6 down in a tiebreaker), and upcoming star Lleyton Hewitt in the semi-finals, but lost the final to Marat Safin. Sampras' run to the final briefly returned him to the No. 1 ranking, but Gustavo Kuerten ended the year atop the rankings. This would be the last time Sampras was ranked No. 1, extending his ATP record career total to 286 weeks. (The record was surpassed by Roger Federer in 2012.)

=== 2001: Drop in ranking ===
At the Australian Open, Sampras ended a six-year 13 win streak against Todd Martin, losing in the fourth round in four sets. Sampras' 31-match Wimbledon win streak ended in a five set loss to Roger Federer, aged 19, in the fourth round; this was the only time the two ever played against each other in an official professional match. At the US Open, Sampras reached the final but lost in straight sets to Lleyton Hewitt. Overall, this season was the first in 12 years that Sampras did not win a single title, and he finished the year ranked No. 10, also his lowest since 1989.

=== 2002: 14th major and retirement ===
Sampras lost in the fourth round of the Australian Open to Marat Safin in four sets. "Muttering, slouching, slamming his racket to the ground and smacking a ball into the stands, Pete Sampras was in typical French Open form" as he lost to Andrea Gaudenzi in round one, a sixth consecutive early loss at Roland Garros for Sampras. He suffered an early exit from Wimbledon too, losing in the second round to No. 145 fast-court specialist George Bastl of Switzerland. After that loss, Sampras asked his former coach Paul Annacone to return and coach through the US Open. Sampras had a relatively poor summer leading up to the US Open, losing at Cincinnati to No. 70-ranked Wayne Arthurs in the second round, and then was eliminated at the opening round at Long Island by No. 85. Paul-Henri Mathieu.

At the US Open, Sampras was seeded 17th. Greg Rusedski, whom Sampras had defeated in a long five-set third round match at the US Open, said that Sampras was "a step and a half slower" and predicted that Sampras would lose his next match. Sampras, however, then defeated two young stars, Tommy Haas in the fourth round and Andy Roddick in the quarterfinals. He then defeated Sjeng Schalken in the semifinals to reach his third consecutive US Open final, and eighth US Open final overall, tying Ivan Lendl's all-time record. This time, Sampras faced Agassi, whom he had met in his first Grand Slam final 12 years earlier. After a four-set battle between the two veterans, Sampras claimed a then-record 14th Grand Slam singles title and matched Jimmy Connors' Open Era record of five US Open singles championships.

Sampras did not compete in any tour events in the following 12 months, but he did not officially announce his retirement until August 2003, just prior to the US Open. He chose not to defend his title there, but his retirement announcement was timed so that he could say farewell at a special ceremony organized for him at the Open. He thus became the only man in the open era to win the final Grand Slam tournament at which he competed. At the time of his retirement, many regarded Sampras as the greatest player of all time.

== Post-retirement activity ==
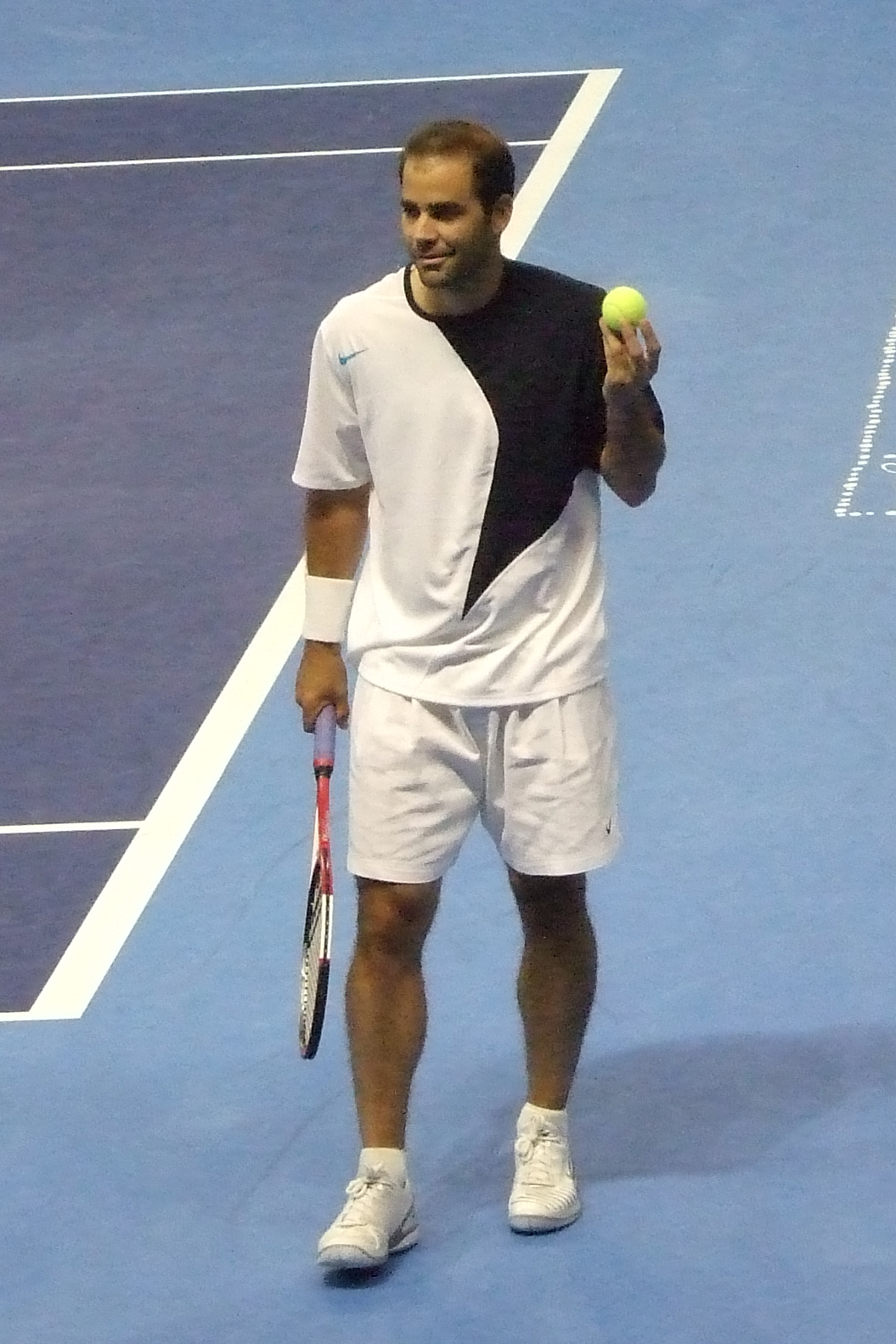
Sampras at Champions Cup Boston, in 2007

On April 6, 2006, Sampras resurfaced and played his first exhibition match in River Oaks, Houston, Texas, against 23-year-old Robby Ginepri. Ginepri won the match in two sets. Sampras later announced that he would be playing in World Team Tennis events.

In 2007, Sampras played in a few events on the Outback Champions Series, a group of tournaments for former ATP players who met certain criteria during their careers. Sampras won his first two events on tour, defeating Todd Martin in both finals. John McEnroe said that Sampras would be worthy of a top five seeding at Wimbledon were he to enter the tournament.

On November 20, 2007, Sampras lost the first of three exhibition matches in Asia against then world #1 Roger Federer in Seoul, Korea. Two days later in Kuala Lumpur, Sampras again lost to Federer in two tiebreaks. However, Sampras was able to win the last match of the series, winning in two sets on fast carpet.

On February 18, 2008, in an exhibition match during the SAP Open, Sampras defeated another active player, former No. 2 Tommy Haas. Sampras dispatched the German in 43 minutes.

On March 10, 2008, Sampras played another exhibition match against No. 1 Roger Federer at Madison Square Garden in New York City. Sampras lost in three tight sets, despite serving for the match.

In 2009, Sampras won two Outback Champions Series titles. He beat McEnroe in the final of the Champions Cup Boston in February and Patrick Rafter in the final of The Del Mar Development Champions Cup in March.

Sampras was present at the 2009 Wimbledon final between Andy Roddick and Roger Federer to witness Federer eclipse his mark of 14 major titles and become the most successful man in Grand Slam history. His record of 14 majors had lasted for seven years.

The following year along with Federer, Andre Agassi and Rafael Nadal, Sampras played an exhibition doubles match at Indian Wells to raise money for the people of Haiti who had been affected by the earthquake.

In November 2010, Sampras reported that many of his trophies and memorabilia had been stolen from a West Los Angeles public storage facility. The loss included the trophy from his first Australian Open victory, two Davis Cups, an Olympic ring and six trophies for finishing top in the year-end rankings. Most of the stolen items have since been recovered and returned.

On November 17, 2011, Sampras lost an exhibition match against Milos Raonic. His serve approached 200 km/h (124 mph) throughout the night.

== Rivalries ==
=== Sampras vs. Agassi ===
They had contrasting playing styles, with Sampras and Agassi being considered respectively the greatest server and the greatest serve returner of their eras. Sampras led 20–14 in matches against Agassi.

The 1990 US Open (their first meeting in a Grand Slam final), Agassi lost to Sampras in straight sets. Their next Grand Slam meeting was at the 1992 French Open, where Agassi won the quarterfinal in straight sets. Their next Grand Slam meeting was the quarterfinals of Wimbledon in 1993, where Agassi was the defending champion and Sampras was the newly crowned No. 1. Sampras won in five sets.

Notable Sampras–Agassi matches of 1995 were the finals of the Australian Open, the Newsweek Champions Cup, the Lipton International Players Championships, the Canadian Open, and the US Open, with Sampras winning the Newsweek Champions Cup and the US Open.

The next time Sampras and Agassi met in a Grand Slam final was at Wimbledon in 1999, where Sampras won in straight sets. They faced each other twice in the season-ending ATP Tour World Championships, with Sampras losing the round-robin match, but winning the final.

They played each other once in 2000. The top-ranked Agassi defeated No. 3 Sampras in the semifinals of the Australian Open in five sets. Sampras defeated Agassi in the 2001 US Open quarterfinals in four tie break sets. There were no breaks of serve during the match.

The final of the 2002 US Open was their first meeting in a US Open final since 1995. Sampras won in four sets. This was the final ATP tour singles match of Sampras's career.

In 2009, in Macau Agassi and Sampras met for the first time on court since the 2002 US Open final. Sampras won the exhibition in three sets. In August 2010, Sampras played an exhibition with Agassi at the indoor arena Coliseo Cubierto El Campin in Bogotá, Colombia.

=== Sampras vs. Becker ===
They had similar playing styles. They both had strong serves. They often came to the net after serving. Sampras said "when you have two guys that serve extremely big and volley pretty well, you are not going to have long rallies".

Overall Sampras led 12–7 against Becker. They had a close rivalry on indoor carpet with Becker leading 7–6. Sampras led 3–0 on grass, 2–0 on hard courts and 1–0 on clay. Sampras beat Becker 3 times at Wimbledon between 1993 and 1997 (including the 1995 final). Becker said "I can't say that this is my place anymore. I used to own it, but Pete Sampras had taken over the keys."

=== Sampras vs. Rafter ===
Sampras led 12–4 in matches against Patrick Rafter.

Up to Rafter winning the 1997 US Open, Sampras led their rivalry 5–1. He beat Rafter three times in late 1997. "We're not the best of mates," Rafter said of Sampras after 1997 Davis Cup semifinals, "I wouldn't go out for a beer with him, put it that way. I don't know what the story is. There's a bit of feeling."

In 1998, Rafter beat Sampras in the Cincinnati Masters final. Rafter's serve was called out on match point, but the umpire overruled the call to give Rafter the ace and the title. Sampras was displeased, and stood at the baseline for several seconds, making Rafter wait at the net, and then refused to shake the umpire's hand. Sampras, at the time winner of 11 Grand Slams, when asked about the difference between himself and Rafter, said "Ten grand slams", that a controversial line-call cost him the match, and that a player had to come back and win another Grand Slam title in order to be considered great.

The two met in the semifinals of the 1998 US Open, where Sampras called for a trainer, and Rafter broke Sampras twice in the deciding fifth set. Sampras's loss denied him the chance to match Jimmy Connors' five U.S. Open titles and Roy Emerson's 12 Grand Slam singles titles. Sampras cited a leg injury as the reason Rafter won, upsetting the Australian: "We are out there busting our guts and he doesn't show a lot of respect at the end of the day. He tries to play down the reason why he lost, giving no respect to the other player, and that is what really upsets me about him and the reason I try to piss him off as much as I can", said Rafter. Sampras said of Rafter (after Pat had won the US Open final), "When I see him holding the US Open trophy, it pisses me off." Rafter responded by calling Sampras a "cry baby" and saying that it would be better for tennis if someone besides the American were No. 1.

Sampras lost a third consecutive time against Rafter at the World Team Cup, in straight sets, just before the French Open. By the summer of 1999, having compiled a 24-match winning streak of four titles including Wimbledon, Sampras beat Rafter in the Cincinnati Masters final. The two were friendly in the trophy ceremony.

The next Sampras-Rafter match was the 2000 Wimbledon final. It was the first time in years their parents would see their sons play. Sampras lost the first-set tiebreaker, and trailed in the second-set tiebreaker 1–4 before winning the set, then won the third and fourth sets for the Championship, as dusk fell. That victory gave Sampras his 13th Grand Slam title, breaking Roy Emerson's record. After the match ended, Sampras called Rafter "all class, on and off the court", while Rafter said he was lucky to overcome early season injuries to make the final.

Sampras beat Rafter in the 2001 Indian Wells quarterfinals and Pete beat Pat again in the fourth round of the 2001 US Open. This match ended Rafter's Grand Slam singles career.

== Playing style ==
Sampras was an all-court player who would often serve and volley. Possessing an all-around skill, in the early years of his career, when not serving, his strategy was to be offensive from the baseline, put opponents in a defensive position, and finish points at the net. In his later years, he became even more offensive and would either employ a chip-and-charge strategy or try to hit an offensive shot on the return and follow his return to the net.

He had an accurate and powerful first serve – widely considered among players, commentators and fans as one of the best of all time. He had great disguise on both his first and second serves, and his second serve was nearly as powerful as his first. He was known for producing aces on critical points, even with his second serves.

Sampras was able to hit winners from both his forehand and backhand from all over the court. He was able to catch attacks wide to his forehand using his speed and hitting a forehand shot on the run. When successfully executed, he won many points outright or put opponents immediately on the defensive, due to the considerable pace and flat nature of the shot. This style did not help him on clay courts, according to some critics.

=== Equipment ===
Sampras used one racket type, the Wilson Pro Staff Original, for his entire professional career—a racket first introduced in 1983. He played with Babolat natural gut, with all his rackets re-strung before each match (used or not) at 75 lbs tension (more or less, depending on conditions). His rackets had weight added to bring them close to 400 g, but the frame proper was a production model manufactured at a Wilson factory on the Caribbean island of St. Vincent. The handles were custom-built.

Post-retirement, Sampras has used a slightly modified Pro Staff Tour 90 and, from 2008, a new version of the original Pro Staff, produced with in-between head size of 88 square inches and heavier weight at 349 grams unstrung.

Since mid-2010, Sampras has been spotted at multiple exhibitions playing with a Babolat Pure Storm Tour, along with Babolat's popular RPM Blast strings.

"I need a little more pop. ... I need it if I'm going to play some tennis," he said after playing Gaël Monfils in an exhibition at the SAP Open.

During a good part of 2011, Sampras used a racquet that was painted all black, with Tourna Grip and Tourna Damper.

In the late 1980s, Sampras signed a three-year endorsement contract with Sergio Tacchini. It was extended to five years before Sampras signed with Nike in 1994. He wore Nike apparel and Nike Air Oscillate footwear on court.

== Personal life ==
Sampras's mother was born in Greece and his father was born in the United States to a Greek father and Polish mother. His older sister, Stella Sampras Webster, is the women's tennis head coach at UCLA, and his younger sister, Marion, is a teacher in Los Angeles. His older brother, Gus, has been tournament director at the Scottsdale ATP event. In 2007 he became president of the firm managing Pete's business activities.

On September 30, 2000, Sampras married American actress and former Miss Teen USA Bridgette Wilson. On November 21, 2002, their first son was born. On July 29, 2005, the couple had their second son. They reside in Lake Sherwood, California. Both Sampras and Wilson were committed to raising their children out of the public eye and both retired from their careers to focus on family life.

Sampras has β-thalassemia minor, a genetic trait that sometimes causes mild anemia.

Politically, Sampras is a Republican. He supported John McCain in 2008.

== Tennis legacy ==
During his tennis career, Sampras won 14 major singles titles, a record he held until Roger Federer surpassed him in 2009. He was 14–4 in major finals and, while he never won the French Open, he dominated on grass with seven Wimbledon victories. Sampras won the US Open in 1990 as the youngest champion in history, and finished his career with his fifth US title. He won five year-end championships and was world No. 1 for 286 weeks and a record six consecutive years. Sampras won 64 top-level singles titles and was also a member of two champion US Davis Cup teams. Due to his achievements, Sampras is regarded by many as one of the greatest tennis players in the history of the sport. (Note: Tennis magazine ranked Sampras the best player of the period 1965–2005.)

Sampras is remembered for his technique, devastating serve, and his mastery of the serve-and-volley playstyle. Sampras' natural attacking serve-and-volley, quiet demeanor, and all-round game, placed him in contrast to power-baseliner Andre Agassi, who played counter to Sampras' style and was Sampras' biggest rival. It is considered one the sport's iconic rivalries. Sampras won their head-to-head meetings 20–14, and 9–7 in finals.

In 2005, Tennis Magazine named Sampras the greatest player since 1965. In 2012 Tennis Channel produced the "100 Greatest of All Time" where Sampras was ranked the third greatest male player. After winning Wimbledon in 2000, AP News called Sampras the greatest of his generation. Sampras himself said "In a lot of ways, I felt like I was born to win Wimbledon."

Players and sportswriters have agreed that Sampras' place in tennis history is lofty. Roy Emerson, whose 12 major singles titles record Sampras broke, said "Sampras is the greatest of all time, and I have to give him a pat on the back for getting there..." Former player Tony Roche and sportswriter Paul Gable have also called Sampras the greatest of all time. And John McEnroe called Sampras the toughest opponent he ever played.

== Career statistics ==
=== Grand Slam performance timeline ===
Key
W	F	SF	QF	#R	RR	Q#	DNQ	A	NH

(W) winner; (F) finalist; (SF) semifinalist; (QF) quarterfinalist; (#R) rounds 4, 3, 2, 1; (RR) round-robin stage; (Q#) qualification round; (DNQ) did not qualify; (A) absent; (NH) not held; (SR) strike rate (events won / competed); (W–L) win–loss record.

Tournament	1988	1989	1990	1991	1992	1993	1994	1995	1996	1997	1998	1999	2000	2001	2002	SR	W–L	Win
Australian Open	A	1R	4R	A	A	SF	W	F	3R	W	QF	A	SF	4R	4R	2 / 11	45–9	83%
French Open	A	2R	A	2R	QF	QF	QF	1R	SF	3R	2R	2R	1R	2R	1R	0 / 13	24–13	65%
Wimbledon	A	1R	1R	2R	SF	W	W	W	QF	W	W	W	W	4R	2R	7 / 14	63–7	90%
US Open	1R	4R	W	QF	F	W	4R	W	W	4R	SF	A	F	F	W	5 / 14	71–9	89%
Win–loss	0–1	4–4	10–2	6–3	15–3	23–2	21–2	20–2	18–3	19–2	17–3	8–1	18–3	13–4	11–3	14 / 52	203–38	84%

=== Grand Slam finals 18 (14 titles, 4 runner-ups) ===
Result	Year	Championship	Surface	Opponent	Score
Win	1990	US Open	Hard	(United States) Andre Agassi	6–4, 6–3, 6–2
Loss	1992	US Open	Hard	(Sweden) Stefan Edberg	6–3, 4–6, 6–7^{(5–7)}, 2–6
Win	1993	Wimbledon	Grass	(United States) Jim Courier	7–6^{(7–3)}, 7–6^{(8–6)}, 3–6, 6–3
Win	1993	US Open (2)	Hard	(France) Cédric Pioline	6–4, 6–4, 6–3
Win	1994	Australian Open	Hard	(United States) Todd Martin	7–6^{(7–4)}, 6–4, 6–4
Win	1994	Wimbledon (2)	Grass	(Croatia) Goran Ivanišević	7–6^{(7–2)}, 7–6^{(7–5)}, 6–0
Loss	1995	Australian Open	Hard	(United States) Andre Agassi	6–4, 1–6, 6–7^{(6–8)}, 4–6
Win	1995	Wimbledon (3)	Grass	(Germany) Boris Becker	6–7^{(5–7)}, 6–2, 6–4, 6–2
Win	1995	US Open (3)	Hard	(United States) Andre Agassi	6–4, 6–3, 4–6, 7–5
Win	1996	US Open (4)	Hard	(United States) Michael Chang	6–1, 6–4, 7–6^{(7–3)}
Win	1997	Australian Open (2)	Hard	(Spain) Carlos Moyá	6–2, 6–3, 6–3
Win	1997	Wimbledon (4)	Grass	(France) Cédric Pioline	6–4, 6–2, 6–4
Win	1998	Wimbledon (5)	Grass	(Croatia) Goran Ivanišević	6–7^{(2–7)}, 7–6^{(11–9)}, 6–4, 3–6, 6–2
Win	1999	Wimbledon (6)	Grass	(United States) Andre Agassi	6–3, 6–4, 7–5
Win	2000	Wimbledon (7)	Grass	(Australia) Patrick Rafter	6–7^{(10–12)}, 7–6^{(7–5)}, 6–4, 6–2
Loss	2000	US Open	Hard	(Russia) Marat Safin	4–6, 3–6, 3–6
Loss	2001	US Open	Hard	(Australia) Lleyton Hewitt	6–7^{(4–7)}, 1–6, 1–6
Win	2002	US Open (5)	Hard	(United States) Andre Agassi	6–3, 6–4, 5–7, 6–4

== Records and achievements ==
=== Records ===
- These records were attained in Open Era of tennis.
- Records in **bold** indicate peer-less achievements.

Time span	Selected Grand Slam tournament records	Players matched
1995 Wimbledon — 2000 US Open	8 consecutive finals appearances won (Note: This record was achieved in non-consecutive Majors. The record for most consecutive Grand Slam finals won is 4, achieved by Rod Laver in 1969 (the same year he achieved the Grand Slam) and Novak Djokovic in 2015—16.)	**Stands alone**
1992 US Open — 2002 US Open	11 consecutive years reaching 1+ final	Ivan Lendl
1989 Wimbledon — 2002 Wimbledon	90% (63–7) grass court match winning percentage	**Stands alone**
1990 US Open — 2002 US Open	Won a Grand Slam in teens, twenties and thirties	Rafael Nadal; Ken Rosewall

Grand Slam tournaments	Time span	Records at each Grand Slam tournament	Players matched
US Open	1990–2002	5 titles overall	Jimmy Connors; Roger Federer
US Open	1988–2002	88.75% (71–9) match winning percentage	**Stands alone**
US Open	1990	Youngest US Open champion	**Stands alone**

Time span	Other selected records	Players matched
1990, 1997	2 Grand Slam Cup titles	**Stands alone**
1990, 1992, 1997–1998	4 U.S. Pro Indoor titles	Rod Laver; Jimmy Connors; John McEnroe

=== Professional awards ===
- ATP Player of the Year: 1993, 1994, 1995, 1996, 1997, 1998.
- ITF World Champion: 1993, 1994, 1995, 1996, 1997, 1998.

=== Other achievements ===
- Sampras (1997–2000) won four consecutive Wimbledon singles titles, equal to Novak Djokovic and second only to Björn Borg and Roger Federer (who have five consecutive titles each).
- During the Open Era, only Borg (1978–81 French Open and 1976–80 Wimbledon), Sampras (1997–2000 Wimbledon), Federer (2003–07 Wimbledon and 2004–08 US Open), Rafael Nadal (2005–08 French Open, 2010–14 French Open and 2017–20 French Open) and Djokovic (2018–2022 Wimbledon) have won at least one Grand Slam tournament four consecutive times.
- Ken Rosewall, Sampras and Nadal are the only men to have won Grand Slam singles titles as a teenager, in their 20s, and in their 30s.
- Sampras won 40 of the 42 singles matches he played on Wimbledon's Centre Court and 63 of the 70 singles matches he played at the All England Club. His two defeats on Centre Court were against Richard Krajicek at the 1996 Wimbledon Championships, and Federer at the 2001 Wimbledon Championships.
- Sampras is the only player to win all seven Wimbledon finals he played. In terms of most finals won at a single Grand Slam tournament without losing any, he is second in the Open Era behind only Nadal (who won all fourteen of his French Open finals).

== Other awards ==
Summary of professional awards.

- U.S. Olympic Committee "Sportsman of the Year" in 1997. He was the first tennis player to receive this award.
- GQ's Individual Athlete Award for Man of the Year in 2000.
- Selected the No. 1 player (of 25 players) in the past 25 years by a panel of 100 current and past players, journalists, and tournament directors to commemorate the 25th anniversary of the ATP in 1997.
- Voted 48th athlete of Top 50 Greatest North American Athletes of ESPN's SportsCentury (also youngest on list).
- In 2005, Tennis magazine named Sampras the greatest tennis player for the period 1965 through 2005, from its list, "The 40 Greatest Players of the Tennis Era".

== See also ==
- List of Grand Slam men's singles champions
- All-time tennis records – men's singles
- Open Era tennis records – men's singles

== Further viewing ==
- Wimbledon Classic Match: Federer vs Sampras (2001) Standing Room Only, DVD Release Date: October 31, 2006, Run Time: 233 minutes, ASIN: B000ICLR98.
- Legends of Wimbledon – Pete Sampras (2006) Standing Room Only, DVD Release Date: October 31, 2006, Run Time: 60 minutes, ASIN: B000ICLR84.
- The Netjets Showdown: Pete Sampras vs. Roger Federer (2008) Arts Alliance Amer, DVD Release Date: April 22, 2008, Run Time: 180 minutes, ASIN: B0013PVGN6.

Sporting positions
Preceded by Jim Courier; Jim Courier; Andre Agassi; Thomas Muster; Thomas Muster; Marcelo Ríos; Marcelo Ríos; Carlos Moyá; Yevgeny Kafelnikov; Patrick Rafter; Andre Agassi	World No. 1 April 12, 1993 – August 22, 1993; September 13, 1993 – April 9, 1995; November 6, 1995 – January 28, 1996; February 19, 1996 – March 10, 1996; April 15, 1996 – March 29, 1998; April 27, 1998 – August 9, 1998; August 24, 1998 – March 14, 1999; March 29, 1999 – May 2, 1999; June 14, 1999 – July 4, 1999; August 2, 1999 – September 12, 1999; September 11, 2000 – November 19, 2000	Succeeded by Jim Courier; Andre Agassi; Andre Agassi; Thomas Muster; Marcelo Ríos; Marcelo Ríos; Carlos Moyá; Yevgeny Kafelnikov; Andre Agassi; Andre Agassi; Marat Safin
Awards and achievements
Preceded by Michael Chang	ATP Most Improved Player; 1990	Succeeded by Jim Courier
Preceded by Jim Courier	ATP Player of the Year; 1993–1998	Succeeded by Andre Agassi
Preceded by Jim Courier	ITF World Champion; 1993–1998	Succeeded by Andre Agassi
Preceded by Michael Johnson	USOC Sportsman of the Year; 1997	Succeeded by Jonny Moseley
Records
Preceded by Ivan Lendl	ATP Prize money leader 1996–2007	Succeeded by Roger Federer
Preceded by Björn Borg	Most career Grand Slam singles titles (Open Era); July 4, 1999 – July 5, 2009	Succeeded by Roger Federer
Preceded by Roy Emerson	Most career Grand Slam singles titles July 9, 2000 – July 5, 2009	Succeeded by Roger Federer
Preceded by Ivan Lendl	Most weeks at World No. 1 September 11, 2000 – July 16, 2012	Succeeded by Roger Federer
