= Indianapolis Tennis Center =

Former tennis stadium in Indiana, US (1979–2010)

Coordinates: 39.770009°N 86.172424°W

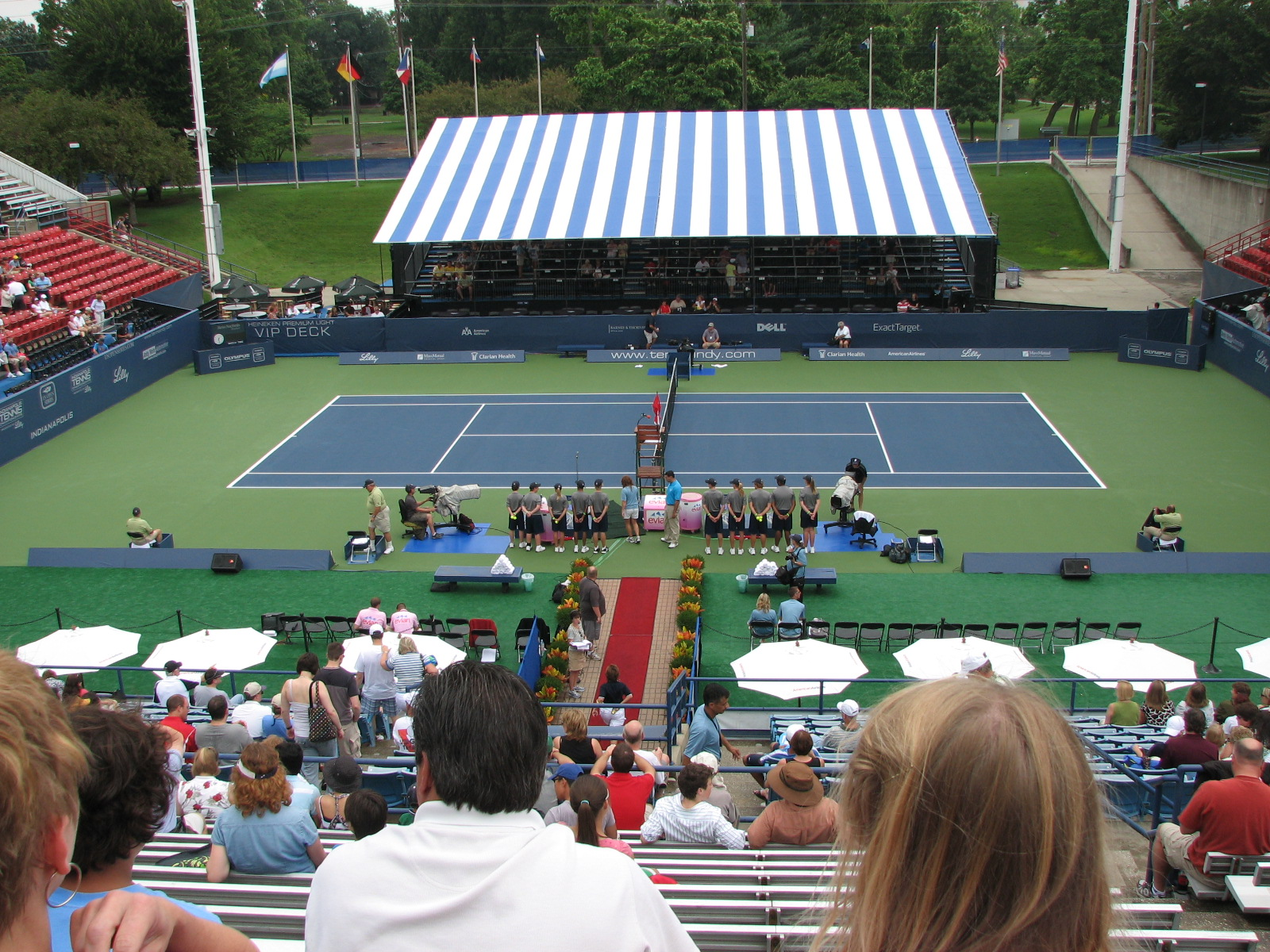
- Interactive map of Indianapolis Tennis Center
- Location: Indianapolis, Indiana United States
- Capacity: 10,000 (tennis)
- Surface: Hard, Outdoors

Construction
- Built: 1979
- Expanded: 1989
- Closed: August 2010
- Demolished: 2010
- Cost: $7 million
- Architect: Browning Day Mullins Dierdorf

Tenants
- Indianapolis Tennis Championships (Tennis) (1988–2009); 1987 Pan American Games (Tennis) (1987)

The Indianapolis Tennis Center, originally known as the Indianapolis Sports Center, was a tennis stadium complex with additional outdoor and indoor tennis courts on the campus of Indiana University – Purdue University Indianapolis (IUPUI) in Indianapolis, Indiana. The stadium, which seated 10,000 spectators, was built in 1979. At that time it was the venue for the U.S. Men's Clay Court Championships tournament. It was also the site of the tennis events for the 1987 Pan American Games.

When originally constructed, the 13 acres (5.3 ha) complex included 14 outdoor courts, all of which, including the stadium court, had a clay surface. In 1989 an indoor facility featuring six DecoTurf Ii courts was added, and the stadium court and other outdoor courts were converted from clay to DecoTurf. Due to the change in playing surface, the name of the tournament was changed to the RCA Tennis Championships. The name of the tournament changed again to the Indianapolis Tennis Championships in 2007 due to the loss of the RCA sponsorship.

Changes to the date of the tournament to a less desirable point in the ATP tour combined with the loss of sponsorship resulted in the tournament being sold and moved to Atlanta, Georgia. Maintenance costs due to the loss of tournament income plus IUPUI's need for the land for future development led to the closure of the facility in August 2010 and its subsequent demolition that year.

== History ==
The City of Indianapolis and IU Trustees proposed a multi-use recreational center be built as the site of the National Clay Court Tournament. The proposed project would be constructed in two phases: Phase I, estimated to cost $6 million, would include a permanent 8,000-seat, air stadium and 17 adjacent courts Phase II calls for a clubhouse that would include dining facilities, racquetball courts, and locker room. The IU School of Physical Education, now known as the School of Health and Human Sciences, taught tennis classes at the complex up until its demolition in 2010.

The Indianapolis Tennis Center was built in 1979 and designed by Browning, Day, Mullins, Dierdorf, Inc. Originally known as the Indianapolis Sports Center, the stadium possessed 10,000 seats. Following its completion in 1979, the Tennis Indianapolis Tennis Center hosted the National Clay Court Tournament, which would later change its name to the RCA Tennis Championships and then the Indianapolis Tennis Championships. The original complex included 14 outdoor courts with a clay surface. The complex had an air-conditioned box for reporters, a Champions room below the south stands, two electronic scoreboards, and multiple locker rooms.

The Tennis Center was the site of tennis events during the 1987 Pan American Games. In 1989, an indoor facility consisting of six DecoTurf style courts was added and the original courts were converted from clay to DecoTurf. In June 1988, Justice Inc. hosted a Pride event at the Indiana Tennis Center which marked one the first LGBTQ events that took place in a public space in Indianapolis. IUPUI assumed management of the Indianapolis Sports Center in 1992 under an agreement with Municipal Recreation Inc. In 2007, the Indianapolis Tennis Center lost the RCA sponsorship, prompting the tournament to change its name to the Indianapolis Tennis Championships. The Tennis Center was closed in August 2010 and demolished the following year.

== See also ==
- List of tennis stadiums by capacity
- Sports in Indianapolis
