= 2010 Open de Nice Côte d'Azur – Doubles =

Doubles
- 2010 Open de Nice Côte d'Azur

Final
- Champions: (Brazil) Marcelo Melo (Brazil) Bruno Soares
- Runners-up: (India) Rohan Bopanna (Pakistan) Aisam-ul-Haq Qureshi
- Score: 1–6, 6–3, [10–5]

Events
Singles	Doubles
- Open de Nice Côte d'Azur

This was the first staging of this tournament and came 15 years after an ATP Tour event was last held at the same venue under a different name.

Marcelo Melo and Bruno Soares won in the final 1–6, 6–3, [10–5], against Rohan Bopanna and Aisam-ul-Haq Qureshi.

== Seeds ==
1. (India) Mahesh Bhupathi / (Belarus) Max Mirnyi (quarterfinals)
2. (Sweden) Robert Lindstedt / (Romania) Horia Tecău (first round)
3. (Brazil) Marcelo Melo / (Brazil) Bruno Soares (champions)
4. (Sweden) Johan Brunström / (Netherlands Antilles) Jean-Julien Rojer (first round)

== Draw ==
Key

- Q = Qualifier
- WC = Wild card
- LL = Lucky loser
- Alt = Alternate
- ITF = ITF entry
- PR = Protected ranking
- SR = Special ranking
- SE = Special exempt
- JE = Junior exempt
- JR = Junior Accelerator Programme entrant
- CO = College Accelerator Programme entrant
- NG = Next Gen Accelerator Program entrant
- w/o = Walkover
- r = Retired
- d = Defaulted

=== Draw ===
First round
1	(India) M Bhupathi (Belarus) M Mirnyi	6	7
(United Kingdom) R Hutchins (Australia) J Kerr	1	5
(Germany) P Marx (Slovakia) I Zelenay	2	7^{7}	[9]
(Italy) A Seppi (Italy) P Starace	6	6^{1}	[10]
3	(Brazil) M Melo (Brazil) B Soares	6	6
WC	(Slovakia) L Lacko (Ukraine) S Stakhovsky	4	4
(Germany) M Kohlmann (Finland) J Nieminen	7^{7}	5	[8]
(United States) E Butorac (United States) S Lipsky	6^{3}	7	[10]
WC	(Switzerland) Y Allegro (Switzerland) M Chiudinelli	0	1
(Czech Republic) M Damm (Slovakia) F Polášek	6	6
(Czech Republic) L Friedl (Serbia) D Vemić	6	3	[10]
4	(Sweden) J Brunström (Netherlands Antilles) J-J Rojer	4	6	[7]
(India) R Bopanna (Pakistan) A-u-H Qureshi	7	6^{6}	[10]
(Germany) S Greul (Netherlands) R Wassen	5	7^{8}	[4]
(United Kingdom) C Fleming (United Kingdom) K Skupski	6	6^{4}	[11]
2	(Sweden) R Lindstedt (Romania) H Tecău	1	7^{7}	[9]

Quarterfinals
1	(India) M Bhupathi (Belarus) M Mirnyi	3	3
(Italy) A Seppi (Italy) P Starace	6	6
3	(Brazil) M Melo (Brazil) B Soares	7^{7}	6
(United States) E Butorac (United States) S Lipsky	6^{2}	4
(Czech Republic) M Damm (Slovakia) F Polášek	4	5
(Czech Republic) L Friedl (Serbia) D Vemić	6	7
(India) R Bopanna (Pakistan) A-u-H Qureshi	6	6
(United Kingdom) C Fleming (United Kingdom) K Skupski	3	2

Semifinals
(Italy) A Seppi (Italy) P Starace	3	4
3	(Brazil) M Melo (Brazil) B Soares	6	6
(Czech Republic) L Friedl (Serbia) D Vemić	6^{5}	6	[8]
(India) R Bopanna (Pakistan) A-u-H Qureshi	7^{7}	3	[10]

Finals
3	(Brazil) M Melo (Brazil) B Soares	1	6	[10]
(India) R Bopanna (Pakistan) A-u-H Qureshi	6	3	[5]
