= 2009 Indianapolis Tennis Championships – Doubles =

Doubles
- 2009 Indianapolis Tennis Championships

Final
- Champions: (Latvia) Ernests Gulbis (Russia) Dmitry Tursunov
- Runners-up: (Australia) Ashley Fisher (Australia) Jordan Kerr
- Score: 6–4, 3–6, [11–9]

Events
Singles	Doubles
← 2008 ·	Indianapolis Tennis Championships	· 2010 →

Ashley Fisher and Tripp Phillips were the defending champions, but Phillips chose not to participate, and only Fisher competed that year.
Fisher partnered with Jordan Kerr, but lost in the final to Ernests Gulbis and Dmitry Tursunov, 6–4, 3–6, [11–9].

== Seeds ==
1. (Australia) Ashley Fisher / (Australia) Jordan Kerr (final)
2. (Australia) Stephen Huss / (United Kingdom) Ross Hutchins (first round)
3. (United States) Eric Butorac / (United States) Scott Lipsky (first round)
4. (South Africa) Rik de Voest / (United States) Rajeev Ram (second round)

== Draw ==
=== Key ===
- Q = Qualifier
- WC = Wild card
- LL = Lucky loser
- Alt = Alternate
- SE = Special exempt
- PR = Protected ranking
- ITF = ITF entry
- JE = Junior exempt
- w/o = Walkover
- r = Retired
- d = Defaulted
- SR = Special ranking

=== Draw ===
First round
1	(Australia) A Fisher (Australia) J Kerr	6	6^{12}	[12]
(Chinese Taipei) Y-h Lu (Germany) F Moser	1	7^{14}	[10]
(Uzbekistan) D Istomin (France) J Ouanna	4	4
(United States) J Levine (Israel) D Sela	6	6
4	(South Africa) R de Voest (United States) R Ram	6	6
WC	(India) H Mankad (United States) D Martin	2	4
(Germany) B Becker (Russia) I Kunitsyn	7	6
(France) A Clément (France) M Gicquel	5	2
(South Africa) J Coetzee (Israel) J Erlich	1	3
(United States) J Cerretani (United States) T Rettenmaier	6	6
(Latvia) E Gulbis (Russia) D Tursunov	6	3	[11]
3	(United States) E Butorac (United States) S Lipsky	3	6	[9]
WC	(Cyprus) M Baghdatis (Argentina) J-F Spina	5	6^{8}
(United States) S Querrey (Pakistan) A-u-H Qureshi	7	7^{10}
ALT	(United States) R Ginepri (United States) J Isner	3	6	[10]
2	(Australia) S Huss (United Kingdom) R Hutchins	6	3	[1]

Quarterfinals
1	(Australia) A Fisher (Australia) J Kerr	2	6	[10]
(United States) J Levine (Israel) D Sela	6	2	[7]
4	(South Africa) R de Voest (United States) R Ram	4	1
(Germany) B Becker (Russia) I Kunitsyn	6	6
(United States) J Cerretani (United States) T Rettenmaier	4	6	[8]
(Latvia) E Gulbis (Russia) D Tursunov	6	4	[10]
(United States) S Querrey (Pakistan) A-u-H Qureshi	6	6
ALT	(United States) R Ginepri (United States) J Isner	4	4

Semifinals
1	(Australia) A Fisher (Australia) J Kerr	7^{15}	2	[12]
(Germany) B Becker (Russia) I Kunitsyn	6^{13}	6	[10]
(Latvia) E Gulbis (Russia) D Tursunov	1	6	[10]
(United States) S Querrey (Pakistan) A-u-H Qureshi	6	2	[8]

Final
1	(Australia) A Fisher (Australia) J Kerr	4	6	[9]
(Latvia) E Gulbis (Russia) D Tursunov	6	3	[11]
