= 1994 Philips Open – Doubles =

Doubles
- 1994 Philips Open

Final
- Champions: (Spain) Javier Sánchez (Australia) Mark Woodforde
- Runners-up: (Netherlands) Hendrik Jan Davids (South Africa) Piet Norval
- Score: 7–5, 6–3

Events
Singles	Doubles
← 1993 ·	Open de Nice Côte d'Azur	· 1995 →

David Macpherson and Scott Melville were the defending champions, but competed this year with different partners. Macpherson teamed up with Steve DeVries and lost in the quarterfinals to Tom Nijssen and Cyril Suk, while Melville teamed up with Emilio Sánchez and lost in the first round to Hendrik Jan Davids and Piet Norval.

Javier Sánchez and Mark Woodforde won the title by defeating Hendrik Jan Davids and Piet Norval 7–5, 6–3 in the final.

== Seeds ==
1. (Netherlands) Tom Nijssen / (Czech Republic) Cyril Suk (semifinals)
2. (United States) Luke Jensen / (United States) Murphy Jensen (quarterfinals)
3. (United States) Scott Melville / (Spain) Emilio Sánchez (first round)
4. (Spain) Javier Sánchez / (Australia) Mark Woodforde (champions)

== Draw ==
=== Key ===
- Q = Qualifier
- WC = Wild card
- LL = Lucky loser
- Alt = Alternate
- SE = Special exempt
- PR = Protected ranking
- ITF = ITF entry
- JE = Junior exempt
- w/o = Walkover
- r = Retired
- d = Defaulted
- SR = Special ranking

=== Draw ===
First round
1	(Netherlands) T Nijssen (Czech Republic) C Suk	4	7	7
(Australia) A Kratzmann (Australia) M Kratzmann	6	6	5
(Czech Republic) L Pimek (United States) G Van Emburgh	3	4
(United States) S DeVries (Australia) D Macpherson	6	6
4	(Spain) J Sánchez (Australia) M Woodforde	6	6
(United States) S Cannon (Netherlands) M Koevermans	2	3
WC	(United States) J Courier (Switzerland) J Hlasek	6	6	5
WC	(France) A Boetsch (Switzerland) M Rosset	7	4	7
(South Africa) JL de Jager (South Africa) W Ferreira	1	7	6
(United States) M Bauer (South Africa) B Talbot	6	6	7
(Netherlands) H Jan Davids (South Africa) P Norval	6	6
3	(United States) S Melville (Spain) E Sánchez	3	3
Q	(Uruguay) D Pérez (Peru) J Yzaga	6	6
(Sweden) S Edberg (Germany) U Riglewski	4	4
(Russia) Y Kafelnikov (Netherlands) M Oosting	6	3	6
2	(United States) L Jensen (United States) M Jensen	2	6	7

Quarterfinals
1	(Netherlands) T Nijssen (Czech Republic) C Suk	4	6	6
(United States) S DeVries (Australia) D Macpherson	6	3	4
4	(Spain) J Sánchez (Australia) M Woodforde	w/o
WC	(France) A Boetsch (Switzerland) M Rosset
(United States) M Bauer (South Africa) B Talbot	2	7	4
(Netherlands) H Jan Davids (South Africa) P Norval	6	5	6
Q	(Uruguay) D Pérez (Peru) J Yzaga	3	6	6
2	(United States) L Jensen (United States) M Jensen	6	3	2

Semifinals
1	(Netherlands) T Nijssen (Czech Republic) C Suk	4	0
4	(Spain) J Sánchez (Australia) M Woodforde	6	6
(Netherlands) H Jan Davids (South Africa) P Norval	7	6
Q	(Uruguay) D Pérez (Peru) J Yzaga	5	4

Final
4	(Spain) J Sánchez (Australia) M Woodforde	7	6
(Netherlands) H Jan Davids (South Africa) P Norval	5	3
