= 1994 Philips Open – Singles =

Singles
- 1994 Philips Open

Final
- Champion: (Spain) Alberto Berasategui
- Runner-up: (United States) Jim Courier
- Score: 6–4, 6–2

Details
- Draw: 32 (3WC/4Q/1LL)
- Seeds: 8

Events
Singles	Doubles
← 1993 ·	Open de Nice Côte d'Azur	· 1995 →

Marc-Kevin Goellner was the defending champion, but did not compete this year.

Alberto Berasategui won the title by defeating Jim Courier 6–4, 6–2 in the final.

== Seeds ==
1. (Sweden) Stefan Edberg (quarterfinals)
2. (United States) Jim Courier (final)
3. (Sweden) Magnus Gustafsson (first round)
4. (France) Cédric Pioline (second round)
5. (Switzerland) Marc Rosset (semifinals)
6. (France) Arnaud Boetsch (second round)
7. (South Africa) Wayne Ferreira (quarterfinals)
8. (Peru) Jaime Yzaga (first round)

== Draw ==
=== Key ===
- Q = Qualifier
- WC = Wild card
- LL = Lucky loser
- Alt = Alternate
- SE = Special exempt
- PR = Protected ranking
- ITF = ITF entry
- JE = Junior exempt
- w/o = Walkover
- r = Retired
- d = Defaulted
- SR = Special ranking

=== Finals ===
Semifinals
(Spain) Alberto Berasategui	3	6	6
(Czech Republic) Sláva Doseděl	6	3	4
5	(Switzerland) Marc Rosset	0	3
2	(United States) Jim Courier	6	6

Final
(Spain) Alberto Berasategui	6	6
2	(United States) Jim Courier	4	2

=== Top half ===
First round
1	(Sweden) S Edberg	4	6	6
LL	(Italy) D Sanguinetti	6	2	4
Q	(Spain) E Benfele Álvarez	7	7
(Austria) G Schaller	6	6
(Spain) E Sánchez	6	3
(Spain) A Berasategui	7	6
(Russia) A Chesnokov	6	6
8	(Peru) J Yzaga	0	3
3/WC	(Sweden) M Gustafsson	7	4	2
WC	(France) T Guardiola	6	6	6
(Spain) J Burillo	6	4
Q	(France) T Champion	4	0^{r}
(South Africa) M Ondruska	6	6	5
(Czech Republic) S Doseděl	7	1	7
(Argentina) H de la Peña	1	0^{r}
6	(France) A Boetsch	6	1

Second round
1	(Sweden) S Edberg	6	6
Q	(Spain) E Benfele Álvarez	0	3
(Spain) A Berasategui	5
(Russia) A Chesnokov	1^{r}
WC	(France) T Guardiola	3	7	6
(Spain) J Burillo	6	5	4
(Czech Republic) S Doseděl	6	6
6	(France) A Boetsch	4	2

Quarterfinals
1	(Sweden) S Edberg	4	3
(Spain) A Berasategui	6	6
WC	(France) T Guardiola	4	6
(Czech Republic) S Doseděl	6	7

Semifinals
(Spain) A Berasategui	3	6	6
(Czech Republic) S Doseděl	6	3	4

=== Bottom half ===
First round
5	(Switzerland) M Rosset	2	7	6
(Haiti) R Agénor	6	6	1
Q	(Italy) P Canè	3	6	6
(Morocco) Y El Aynaoui	6	4	4
(Spain) J Sánchez	4	2
(Spain) J Arrese	6	6
(Australia) M Woodforde	4	5
4	(France) C Pioline	6	7
7/WC	(South Africa) W Ferreira	7	6
(Australia) R Fromberg	5	1
(Czech Republic) D Rikl	6	6
Q	(Italy) M Visconti	3	4
(France) R Gilbert	6	4
(Sweden) J Svensson	7	6
(Russia) Y Kafelnikov	3	2
2	(United States) J Courier	6	6

Second round
5	(Switzerland) M Rosset	6	6
Q	(Italy) P Canè	1	3
(Spain) J Arrese	3	6	6
4	(France) C Pioline	6	2	4
7/WC	(South Africa) W Ferreira	6	6
(Czech Republic) D Rikl	2	4
(Sweden) J Svensson	5	6	3
2	(United States) J Courier	7	3	6

Quarterfinals
5	(Switzerland) M Rosset	6	3	7
(Spain) J Arrese	4	6	6
7/WC	(South Africa) W Ferreira	3	2
2	(United States) J Courier	6	6

Semifinals
5	(Switzerland) M Rosset	0	3
2	(United States) J Courier	6	6
