= 2010 Open de Nice Côte d'Azur – Singles =

Singles
- 2010 Open de Nice Côte d'Azur

Final
- Champion: (France) Richard Gasquet
- Runner-up: (Spain) Fernando Verdasco
- Score: 6–3, 5–7, 7–6^{(7–5)}

Events
Singles	Doubles
- Open de Nice Côte d'Azur

This was the first staging of this tournament and came 15 years after an ATP Tour event was last held at the same venue under a different name.

Richard Gasquet won in the final 6–3, 5–7, 7–6^{(7–5)} against Fernando Verdasco, to end his two and a half year title drought.

== Seeds ==
The top four seeds receive a bye into the second round.

1. (Sweden) Robin Söderling (second round)
2. (Spain) Fernando Verdasco (final)
3. (France) Gaël Monfils (quarterfinals)
4. (Brazil) Thomaz Bellucci (second round)
5. (Cyprus) Marcos Baghdatis (quarterfinals)
6. (Spain) Albert Montañés (first round)
7. (Germany) Michael Berrer (first round)
8. (Poland) Łukasz Kubot (second round)

== Draw ==
Key

- Q = Qualifier
- WC = Wild card
- LL = Lucky loser
- Alt = Alternate
- ITF = ITF entry
- PR = Protected ranking
- SR = Special ranking
- SE = Special exempt
- JE = Junior exempt
- JR = Junior Accelerator Programme entrant
- CO = College Accelerator Programme entrant
- NG = Next Gen Accelerator Program entrant
- w/o = Walkover
- r = Retired
- d = Defaulted

=== Finals ===
Semifinals
(France) Richard Gasquet	7^{7}	7^{8}
(Italy) Potito Starace	6^{1}	6^{6}
(Argentina) Leonardo Mayer	6^{3}	5
2	(Spain) Fernando Verdasco	7^{7}	7

Final
(France) Richard Gasquet	6	5	7^{7}
2	(Spain) Fernando Verdasco	3	7	6^{5}

=== Top half ===
First round
Q	(France) A Mannarino	3	1
(Belgium) O Rochus	6	6
(France) R Gasquet	6	6
(Slovakia) L Lacko	3	0
(Ukraine) A Dolgopolov	6	7
6	(Spain) A Montañés	3	5
(Italy) F Fognini	5	2
(Switzerland) M Chiudinelli	7	6
(Italy) P Starace	6	6
Q	(Belgium) S Darcis	3	1
WC	(France) G Mina	5	4
8	(Poland) Ł Kubot	7	6

Second round
1	(Sweden) R Söderling	6	4	4
(Belgium) O Rochus	2	6	6
(France) R Gasquet	6	2	6
(Ukraine) A Dolgopolov	0	6	3
3	(France) G Monfils	1	6	6
(Switzerland) M Chiudinelli	6	1	4
(Italy) P Starace	6	6
8	(Poland) Ł Kubot	3	4

Quarterfinals
(Belgium) O Rochus	4	2
(France) R Gasquet	6	6
3	(France) G Monfils	6^{2}	2
(Italy) P Starace	7^{7}	6

Semifinals
(France) R Gasquet	7^{7}	7^{8}
(Italy) P Starace	6^{1}	6^{6}

=== Bottom half ===
First round
5	(Cyprus) M Baghdatis	6	7
LL	(France) L Recouderc	4	5
WC	(France) A Clément	3	4
(Germany) S Greul	6	6
(Argentina) L Mayer	1	6	6
Q	(France) D Guez	6	1	3
7	(Germany) M Berrer	3	5
(Italy) A Seppi	6	7
(Finland) J Nieminen	6	3	4
(Ukraine) S Stakhovsky	2	6	6
(France) F Serra	7	7^{7}
Q	(Ukraine) I Marchenko	5	6^{4}

Second round
5	(Cyprus) M Baghdatis	6	6
(Germany) S Greul	3	2
(Argentina) L Mayer	6	6
4	(Brazil) T Bellucci	4	1
(Italy) A Seppi	5	3
(Ukraine) S Stakhovsky	7	6
(France) F Serra	2	2
2	(Spain) F Verdasco	6	6

Quarterfinals
5	(Cyprus) M Baghdatis	7	3	4
(Argentina) L Mayer	5	6	6
(Ukraine) S Stakhovsky	2	7^{7}	4
2	(Spain) F Verdasco	6	6^{5}	6

Semifinals
(Argentina) L Mayer	6^{3}	5
2	(Spain) F Verdasco	7^{7}	7
