= 1994 Philips Open =

- Date: 11–17 April
- Edition: 23rd
- Category: ATP World Series
- Draw: 32S / 16D
- Prize money: $288,750
- Surface: Clay / outdoor
- Location: Nice, France
- Venue: Nice Lawn Tennis Club

Champions

Singles
- (Spain) Alberto Berasategui

Doubles
- (Spain) Javier Sánchez / (Australia) Mark Woodforde
← 1993 ·	Open de Nice Côte d'Azur	· 1995 →

The 1994 Philips Open was a men's tennis tournament played on outdoor clay courts at the Nice Lawn Tennis Club in Nice, France, and was part of the ATP World Series of the 1994 ATP Tour. It was the 23rd edition of the tournament and took place from 11 April until 17 April 1994. Unseeded Alberto Berasategui won the singles title.

== Finals ==
=== Singles ===
(Spain) Alberto Berasategui defeated (United States) Jim Courier 6–4, 6–2

- It was Berasategui's first singles title of the year and the second his career.

=== Doubles ===
(Spain) Javier Sánchez / (Australia) Mark Woodforde defeated (Netherlands) Hendrik Jan Davids / (South Africa) Piet Norval 7–5, 6–3
