= 1995 Philips Open – Doubles =

Doubles
- 1995 Philips Open

Final
- Champions: (Czech Republic) Cyril Suk (Czech Republic) Daniel Vacek
- Runners-up: (United States) Luke Jensen (United States) David Wheaton
- Score: 3–6, 7–6, 7–6

Events
Singles	Doubles
← 1994 ·	Open de Nice Côte d'Azur	· 2010 →

Javier Sánchez and Mark Woodforde were the defending champions, but competed this year with different partners. Sánchez teamed up with Luis Lobo and lost in the first round to David Adams and Andrei Olhovskiy, while Woodforde teamed up with Yevgeny Kafelnikov and lost in the quarterfinals to Luke Jensen and David Wheaton.

Cyril Suk and Daniel Vacek won the title by defeating Luke Jensen and David Wheaton 3–6, 7–6, 7–6 in the final.

== Seeds ==
1. (Russia) Yevgeny Kafelnikov / (Australia) Mark Woodforde (quarterfinals)
2. (South Africa) David Adams / (Russia) Andrei Olhovskiy (quarterfinals)
3. (Czech Republic) Cyril Suk / (Czech Republic) Daniel Vacek (champions)
4. (South Africa) Gary Muller / (South Africa) Piet Norval (semifinals)

== Draw ==
=== Key ===
- Q = Qualifier
- WC = Wild card
- LL = Lucky loser
- Alt = Alternate
- ITF = ITF entry
- PR = Protected ranking
- SR = Special ranking
- SE = Special exempt
- JE = Junior exempt
- JR = Junior Accelerator Programme entrant
- CO = College Accelerator Programme entrant
- NG = Next Gen Accelerator Program entrant
- w/o = Walkover
- r = Retired
- d = Defaulted

=== Draw ===
First round
1	(Russia) Y Kafelnikov (Australia) M Woodforde	4	6	6
(South Africa) L Bale (South Africa) JL de Jager	6	1	1
Q	(United States) L Jensen (United States) D Wheaton	4	6	6
WC	(Sweden) S Edberg (Czech Republic) P Korda	6	3	4
4	(South Africa) G Muller (South Africa) P Norval	7	6
(United States) T Kronemann (United States) D Randall	5	3
(United States) R Leach (United States) S Melville	3	6	4
(France) O Delaître (France) G Raoux	6	4	6
(Spain) T Carbonell (Spain) F Roig	6	6
(United Kingdom) N Broad (United States) G Van Emburgh	1	3
WC	(France) A Boetsch (Switzerland) M Rosset	3	6	3
3	(Czech Republic) C Suk (Czech Republic) D Vacek	6	3	6
(Netherlands) T Nijssen (Netherlands) M Oosting	6	7
WC	(France) G Forget (France) C Pioline	4	5
(Argentina) L Lobo (Spain) J Sánchez	2	6	6
2	(South Africa) D Adams (Russia) A Olhovskiy	6	4	7

Quarterfinals
1	(Russia) Y Kafelnikov (Australia) M Woodforde	3	6
Q	(United States) L Jensen (United States) D Wheaton	6	7
4	(South Africa) G Muller (South Africa) P Norval	6	6
(France) O Delaître (France) G Raoux	4	3
(Spain) T Carbonell (Spain) F Roig	3	7	6
3	(Czech Republic) C Suk (Czech Republic) D Vacek	6	6	7
(Netherlands) T Nijssen (Netherlands) M Oosting	1	6	7
2	(South Africa) D Adams (Russia) A Olhovskiy	6	3	6

Semifinals
Q	(United States) L Jensen (United States) D Wheaton	6	6
4	(South Africa) G Muller (South Africa) P Norval	1	2
3	(Czech Republic) C Suk (Czech Republic) D Vacek	6	6
(Netherlands) T Nijssen (Netherlands) M Oosting	4	4

Final
Q	(United States) L Jensen (United States) D Wheaton	6	6	6
3	(Czech Republic) C Suk (Czech Republic) D Vacek	3	7	7
