= Crescent Model Higher Secondary School =

School in Lahore, Pakistan

Location
- Shadman Colony, Lahore, Punjab, Pakistan
- 31°32′24″N 74°19′26″E

Information
- Established: 1968; 58 years ago
- Principal: Rabia ali Najam
- Age range: 3–17
- Average class size: 35+
- Language: English
- Schedule: 07:45 AM - 01:50 PM
- Classrooms: >150
- Houses: 4 (Jinnah, Iqbal, Edhi, Sir Syed)
- Slogan: Unity – Faith – Discipline
- Sports: Cricket; football; hockey; swimming; badminton; basketball; athletics; volleyball; gymnastics; tennis; squash
- Publication: Al-Hilal
- Website: crescentschool.edu.pk

Crescent Model Higher Secondary School is an old educational institution in Lahore, Pakistan from Montessori School to Higher Secondary Level. The school is run by a private trust. It offers 'O' and 'A' level programs along with the Pakistan Matriculation degree. It has a main campus for boys and a separate campus for girls, both of which are located in Shadman.

In 2018, Pakistan Post issued a commemorative postage stamp after the school completed fifty years successfully.

== About ==
Crescent Model School was established by Abdul Nafay Majid in early April 1968. At that time, the school was in Qaddafi Stadium, but two years later in 1970 it was moved to a new building in Shadman Colony.

The school offers many indoor and outdoor extracurricular activities. The school has two separate branches for boys and girls. The institution provides the students with ample sports fields, auditoriums, libraries, swimming pools and state-of-the-art science and computer labs. In 2019, professional tennis player and alumnus Aisam-ul-Haq Qureshi laid the foundations of a new tennis court in the school, which was named the "Aisam-ul-Haq Lawn Tennis Court". In 2018, Crescent Model School defeated then 8-times consecutive champions, the Divisional Public School and Intermediate College, Lahore (DPS), and won the ninth Punjab Olympic Games.

== Academics ==
Established in 1968, the school follows the Board of Intermediate and Secondary Education, Lahore. The school has achieved numerous academic achievements since its establishment. It has been producing 99% passing rate since 2004. The students of the school have also achieved top positions in board examinations many times. It also runs classes for pupils interested in O-level and A-level examinations. Courses offered for O-Level include English, Urdu, Mathematics, Physics, Chemistry, Biology, Islamiat/Islamic Studies, Pakistan Studies, Business Studies, Economics, Accounting, Additional Mathematics, Sociology, Global Perspectives, and Travel And Tourism. Although the medium of instruction is English, Islamic Studies are taught in Urdu. The school conducts debate and poetry competitions in both English and Urdu. On 15 December 2018, Crescent Model School hosted an International Education Excellence Conference, called Vision-2050, in Lahore.

== Boys section ==
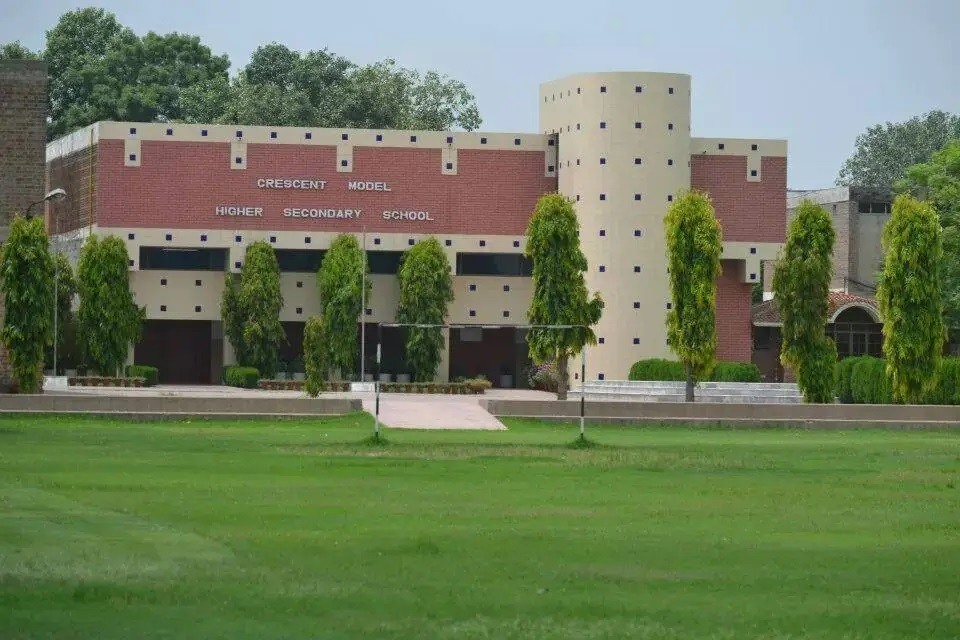
The main administrative building of the Boys Section. Part of the dispensary can be seen in the right side.

The first principal of the Boys Section of Crescent Model School was Sh Moin-Ud-Din. The Boys section is located in the center of Shadman Colony Lahore. The area of the place is about 8 acres. There are 2 swimming pools, four libraries, a gymnasium, and a very large school ground available to the students. There are almost 250 teachers employed, who have a long history at the institution. The Montessori section, Junior Section, High School Section and College are joined collectively as one platform.

== Societies and student bodies ==
Many societies and clubs are available for students to join. These include: Gentlemen's Club, Horse Riding Club, Fencing Club which come under the banner of Minding Manners International. There are also different linguistic societies which offer Arabic, French and a few languages other than Urdu and English [both compulsory].

There are Student Councils at different class levels in both boys and girls campuses of the school in which students are trained to organize events, and competitions and to maintain discipline within the premise of school.

== Admission dates ==
Registrations for Admission to Montessori Section and Class 1 start in January. In February, registrations for admission to Classes II until IX & O Level are taken. Admission tests for Class I are taken in February and results are announced by the end of the month. In March, results are announced for Montessori and Class I intakes and in April new classes begin.

== Notable alumni ==
- Mohsin Raza Naqvi
- Aisam-ul-Haq
- Aleem Khan
