= 2009 Indianapolis Tennis Championships =

- Date: July 20–26
- Edition: 22nd
- Category: ATP World Tour 250
- Draw: 32S / 16D
- Prize money: $450,000
- Surface: Hard / outdoor
- Location: Indianapolis, United States

Champions

Singles
- (United States) Robby Ginepri

Doubles
- (Latvia) Ernests Gulbis/ (Russia) Dmitry Tursunov
- Indianapolis Tennis Championships

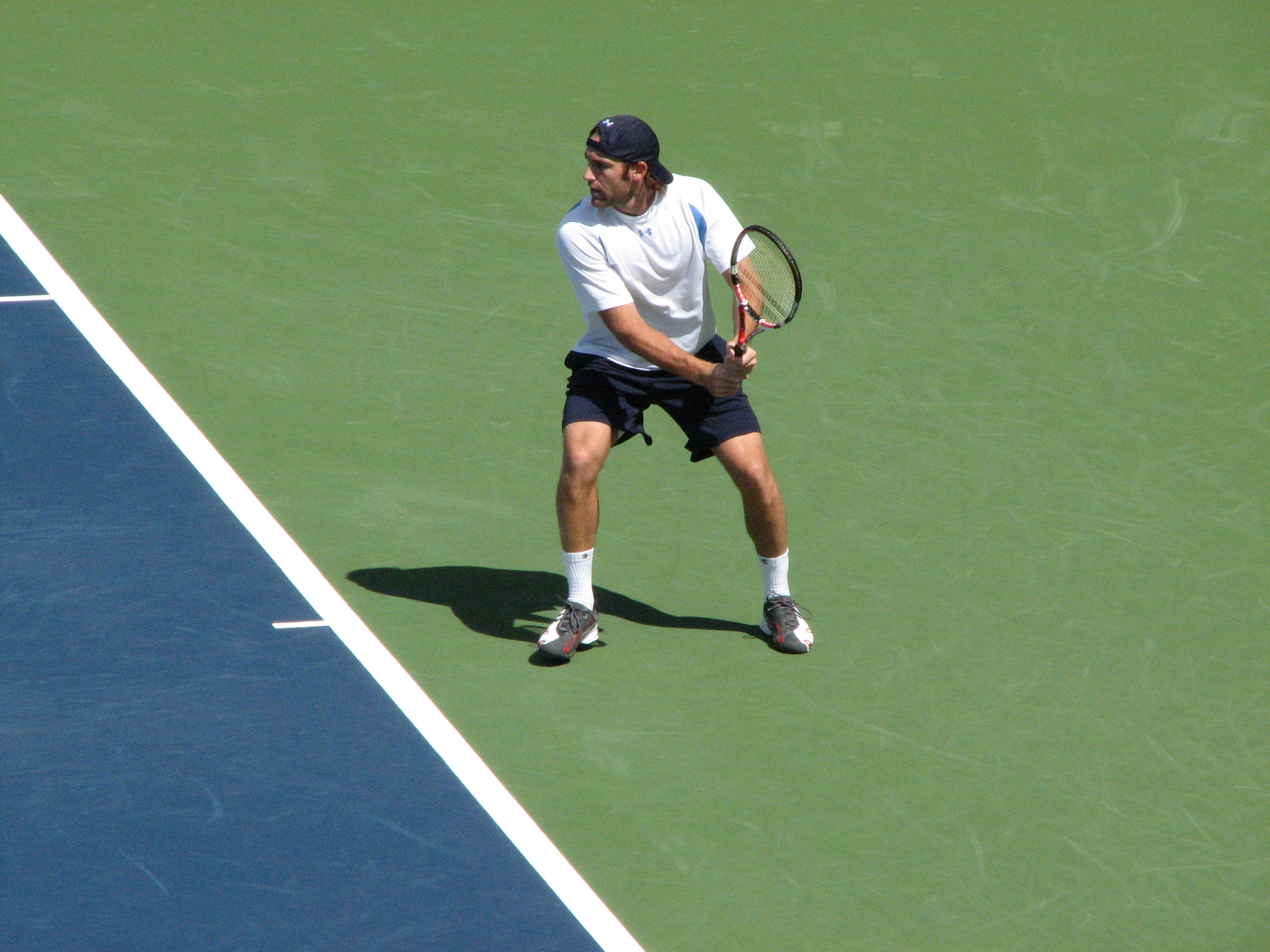
Robby Ginepri defeated Sam Querrey for his third career title, his first since 2005.

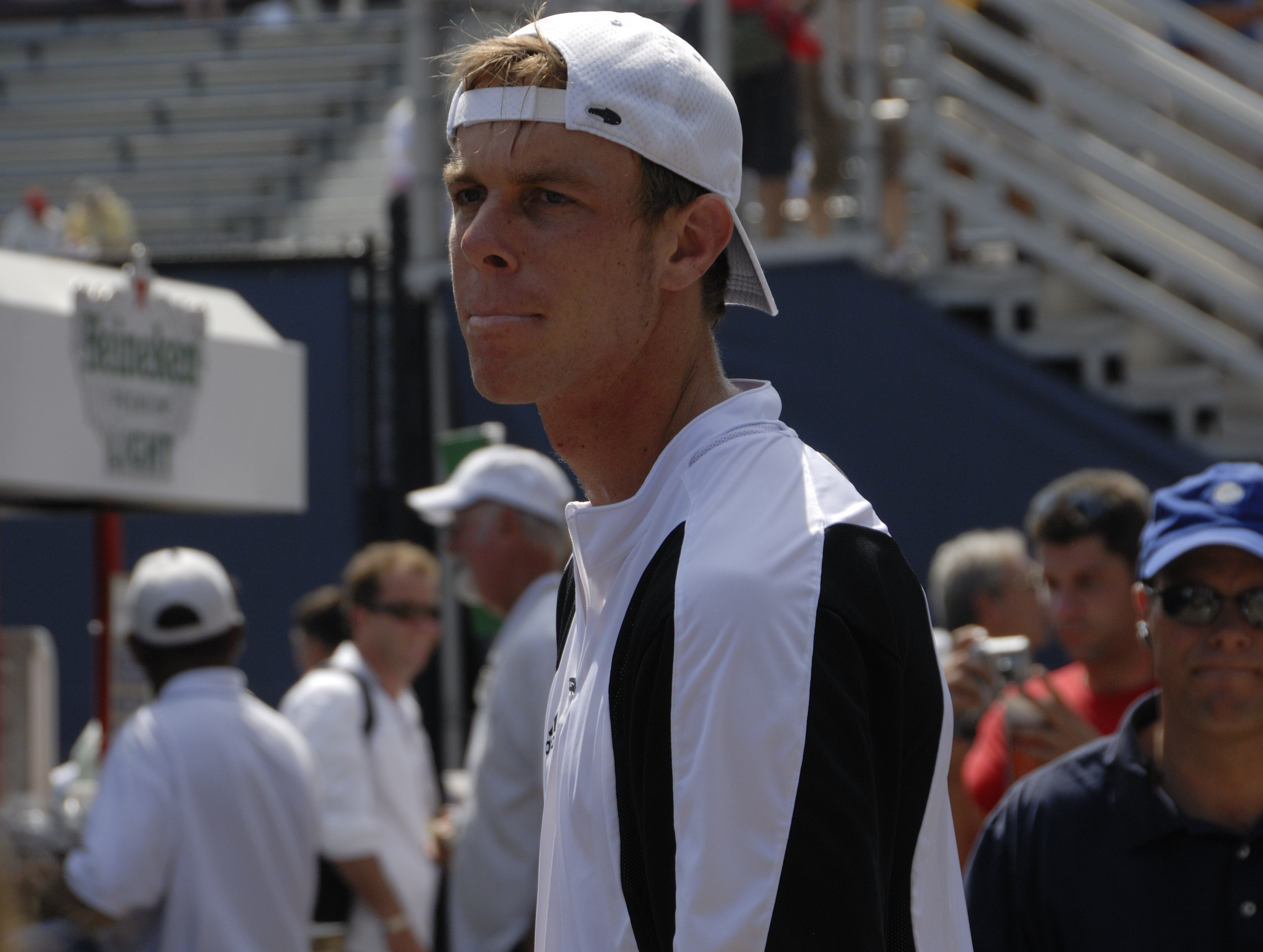
Sam Querrey lost his second straight final, after the 2009 Hall of Fame Tennis Championships two weeks earlier.

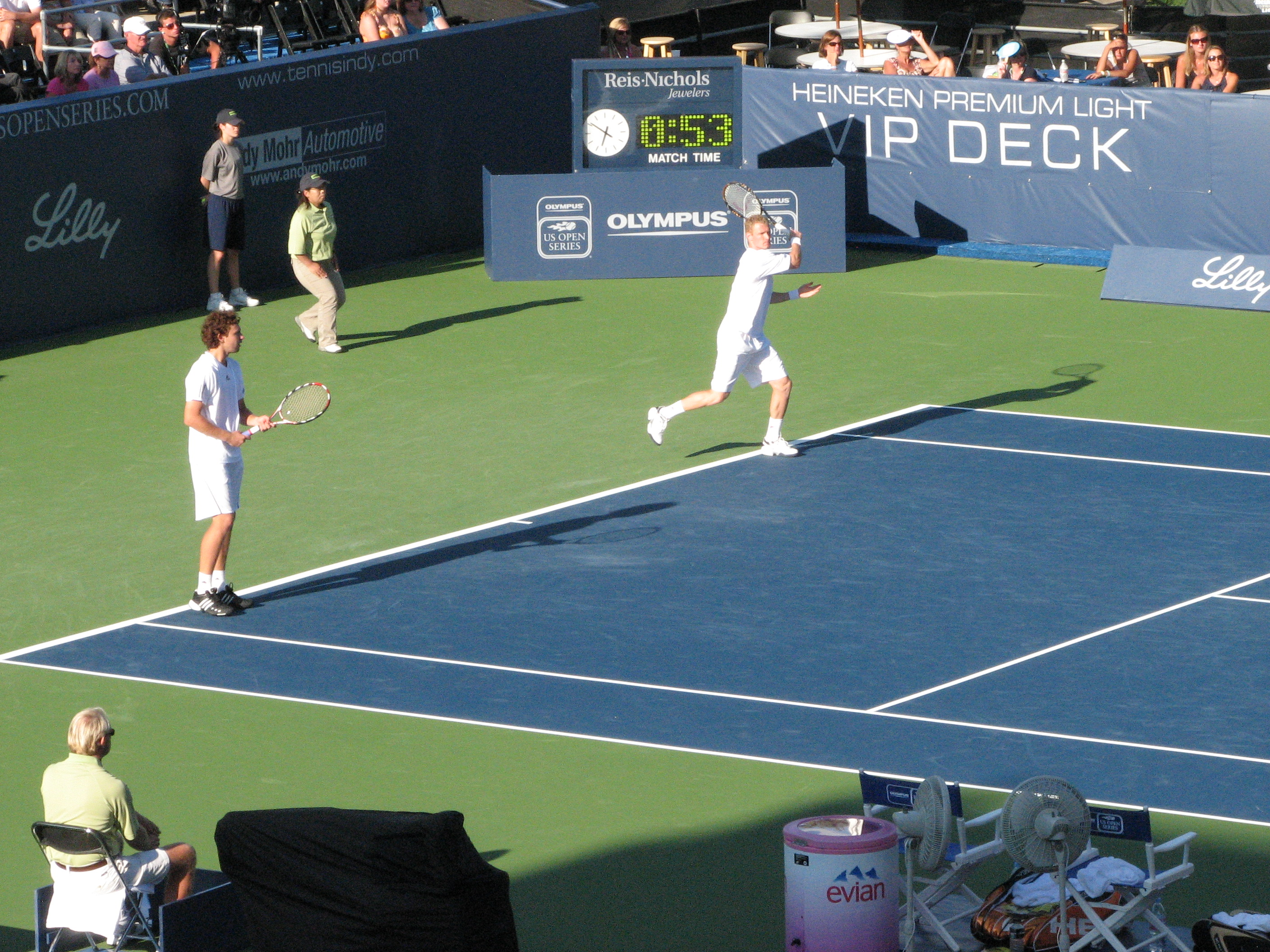
Ernests Gulbis and Dmitry Tursunov partnered to their first doubles title together.

The 2009 Indianapolis Tennis Championships (also known as the Indianapolis Tennis Championships presented by Lilly for sponsorship reasons) was a tennis tournament played on outdoor hard courts. It was the 22nd edition of the event known that year as the Indianapolis Tennis Championships and was part of the ATP World Tour 250 series of the 2009 ATP World Tour. It took place at the Indianapolis Tennis Center in Indianapolis, United States, from July 20 through July 26, 2009. The Indianapolis Tennis Championships was the first ATP stop of the 2009 US Open Series. Unseeded Robby Ginepri won the singles title, his second at the event after 2005.

== Finals ==
=== Singles ===
(United States) Robby Ginepri defeated (United States) Sam Querrey, 6–2, 6–4

- It was Ginepri's only singles title of the year, and the 3rd and last of his career.

=== Doubles ===
(Latvia) Ernests Gulbis / (Russia) Dmitry Tursunov defeated (Australia) Ashley Fisher / (Australia) Jordan Kerr, 6–4, 3–6, [11–9]

- It was Gulbis' only doubles title of the year and the 2nd and last of his career. It was Tursunov's 2nd and last doubles title of the year and the 4th of his career.

== Singles main-draw entrants ==
=== Seeds ===
Player	Nation	Ranking*	Seeding
Dmitry Tursunov	RUS	24	1
Dudi Sela	ISR	30	2
Sam Querrey	USA	34	3
Igor Kunitsyn	RUS	36	4
Benjamin Becker	GER	44	5
Lu Yen-hsun	TPE	57	6
Marc Gicquel	FRA	64	7
Denis Istomin	UZB	68	8

*Seedings based on the July 13, 2009 rankings.

=== Other entrants ===
The following players received wildcards into the singles main draw

- (United States) Taylor Dent
- (United States) Rajeev Ram
- (United States) Devin Britton

The following players received entry from the qualifying draw:

- (United States) Alex Bogomolov Jr.
- (France) Sébastien de Chaunac
- (United States) Jesse Levine
- (Japan) Go Soeda
