= 2009 Indianapolis Tennis Championships – Singles =

Singles
- 2009 Indianapolis Tennis Championships

Final
- Champion: (United States) Robby Ginepri
- Runner-up: (United States) Sam Querrey
- Score: 6–2, 6–4

Details
- Draw: 32 (4 Q / 3 WC )
- Seeds: 8

Events
| Singles | Doubles |
| ← 2008 · | Indianapolis Tennis Championships | · 2010 → |

Gilles Simon was the defending champion, but chose not to participate that year.

Robby Ginepri won in the final, 6–2, 6–4, against Sam Querrey.

== Seeds ==
1. (Russia) Dmitry Tursunov (quarterfinals)
2. (Israel) Dudi Sela (second round)
3. (United States) Sam Querrey (final)
4. (Russia) Igor Kunitsyn (second round)
5. (Germany) Benjamin Becker (second round)
6. (Chinese Taipei) Lu Yen-hsun (first round)
7. (France) Marc Gicquel (quarterfinals)
8. (Uzbekistan) Denis Istomin (second round)

== Draw ==
=== Key ===
- Q = Qualifier
- WC = Wild card
- LL = Lucky loser
- Alt = Alternate
- SE = Special exempt
- PR = Protected ranking
- ITF = ITF entry
- JE = Junior exempt
- w/o = Walkover
- r = Retired
- d = Defaulted
- SR = Special ranking

=== Finals ===
Semifinals
(Canada) Frank Dancevic | 4 | 4
3 | (United States) Sam Querrey | 6 | 6
(United States) John Isner | 4 | 3
(United States) Robby Ginepri | 6 | 6

Final
3 | (United States) Sam Querrey | 2 | 4
(United States) Robby Ginepri | 6 | 6

=== Top half ===
First round
1 | (Russia) D Tursunov | 6 | 2 | 6
(Germany) M Berrer | 3 | 6 | 0
WC | (United States) T Dent | 2 | 4
(Brazil) M Daniel | 6 | 6
(Canada) F Dancevic | 6 | 7^{7}
(United States) B Reynolds | 2 | 6^{5}
Q | (Japan) G Soeda | 2 | 3
5 | (Germany) B Becker | 6 | 6
3 | (United States) S Querrey | 6 | 6
(France) A Clément | 3 | 4
WC | (United States) R Ram | 6 | 7
WC | (United States) D Britton | 3 | 5
(Thailand) D Udomchoke | 1 | 6^{10}
Q | (United States) J Levine | 6 | 7^{12}
(Latvia) E Gulbis | 2 | 3
7 | (France) M Gicquel | 6 | 6

Second round
1 | (Russia) D Tursunov | 6 | 6
(Brazil) M Daniel | 3 | 3
(Canada) F Dancevic | 6 | 7
5 | (Germany) B Becker | 2 | 5
3 | (United States) S Querrey | 7 | 6
WC | (United States) R Ram | 5 | 3
Q | (United States) J Levine | 2 | 2
7 | (France) M Gicquel | 6 | 6

Quarterfinals
1 | (Russia) D Tursunov | 6 | 6^{5} | 2
(Canada) F Dancevic | 3 | 7^{7} | 6
3 | (United States) S Querrey | 6 | 7
7 | (France) M Gicquel | 4 | 5

Semifinals
(Canada) F Dancevic | 4 | 4
3 | (United States) S Querrey | 6 | 6

=== Bottom half ===
First round
8 | (Uzbekistan) D Istomin | 2 | 6 | 6
(United States) K Kim | 6 | 4 | 4
(United States) J Isner | 6 | 7^{8}
(France) J Ouanna | 1 | 6^{6}
(United States) W Odesnik | 7^{7} | 1 | 6
(Cyprus) M Baghdatis | 6^{5} | 6 | 4
(Argentina) B Dabul | 4 | 1
4 | (Russia) I Kunitsyn | 6 | 6
6 | (Chinese Taipei) Y-h Lu | 6 | 3 | 2
(Argentina) E Schwank | 4 | 6 | 6
Q | (France) S de Chaunac | 5 | 7 | 2
(United States) R Ginepri | 7 | 5 | 6
Q | (United States) A Bogomolov Jr. | 6 | 6
(Italy) F Cipolla | 2 | 3
(United States) V Spadea | 5 | 1
2 | (Israel) D Sela | 7 | 6

Second round
8 | (Uzbekistan) D Istomin | 4 | 4
(United States) J Isner | 6 | 6
(United States) W Odesnik | 2 | 6 | 6
4 | (Russia) I Kunitsyn | 6 | 1 | 1
(Argentina) E Schwank | 7^{7} | 3 | 0
(United States) R Ginepri | 6^{1} | 6 | 6
Q | (United States) A Bogomolov Jr. | 6 | 7^{7}
2 | (Israel) D Sela | 4 | 6^{5}

Quarterfinals
(United States) J Isner | 7 | 6^{2} | 7
(United States) W Odesnik | 5 | 7 | 5
(United States) R Ginepri | 7 | 6
Q | (United States) A Bogomolov Jr. | 5 | 1

Semifinals
(United States) J Isner | 4 | 3
(United States) R Ginepri | 6 | 6
