= 1995 Philips Open – Singles =

Singles
- 1995 Philips Open

Final
- Champion: (Switzerland) Marc Rosset
- Runner-up: (Russia) Yevgeny Kafelnikov
- Score: 6–4, 6–0

Details
- Draw: 32 (3WC/4Q/1LL)
- Seeds: 8

Events
Singles	Doubles
← 1994 ·	Open de Nice Côte d'Azur	· 2010 →

Alberto Berasategui was the defending champion, but retired during his first round match against Albert Costa.

Marc Rosset won the title by defeating Yevgeny Kafelnikov 6–4, 6–0 in the final.

== Seeds ==
1. (Russia) Yevgeny Kafelnikov (final)
2. (Spain) Alberto Berasategui (first round, retired)
3. (Croatia) Goran Ivanišević (first round. retired)
4. (Ukraine) Andrei Medvedev (semifinals)
5. (Switzerland) Marc Rosset (champion)
6. (Spain) Àlex Corretja (second round)
7. (Czech Republic) Sláva Doseděl (first round)
8. (France) Guy Forget (first round)

== Draw ==
=== Key ===
- Q = Qualifier
- WC = Wild card
- LL = Lucky loser
- Alt = Alternate
- ITF = ITF entry
- PR = Protected ranking
- SR = Special ranking
- SE = Special exempt
- JE = Junior exempt
- JR = Junior Accelerator Programme entrant
- CO = College Accelerator Programme entrant
- NG = Next Gen Accelerator Program entrant
- w/o = Walkover
- r = Retired
- d = Defaulted

=== Finals ===
Semifinals
1	(Russia) Yevgeny Kafelnikov	4	6	6
4/WC	(Ukraine) Andrei Medvedev	6	4	3
5	(Switzerland) Marc Rosset	2	6	6
(Spain) Albert Costa	6	4	4

Final
1	(Russia) Yevgeny Kafelnikov	4	0
5	(Switzerland) Marc Rosset	6	6

=== Top half ===
First round
1	(Russia) Y Kafelnikov	6	6
(United States) D Wheaton	3	0
(Slovakia) K Kučera	3	4
Q	(Belgium) K Goossens	6	6
(Czech Republic) D Vacek	6	6
(France) A Boetsch	2	2
(France) C Pioline	6	7
8	(France) G Forget	3	6
4/WC	(Ukraine) A Medvedev	6	7
(France) F Santoro	3	5
(Spain) J Sánchez	6	6
(Russia) A Chesnokov	3	3
(Austria) G Schaller	2	6
(Australia) R Fromberg	6	7
Q	(Haiti) R Agénor	6	4	0
6	(Spain) À Corretja	4	6	6

Second round
1	(Russia) Y Kafelnikov	4	6	6
Q	(Belgium) K Goossens	6	3	4
(Czech Republic) D Vacek	4	6	3
(France) C Pioline	6	4	6
4/WC	(Ukraine) A Medvedev	6	6
(Spain) J Sánchez	0	3
(Australia) R Fromberg	6	6
6	(Spain) À Corretja	4	3

Quarterfinals
1	(Russia) Y Kafelnikov	6	1	6
(France) C Pioline	3	6	0
4/WC	(Ukraine) A Medvedev	6	6
(Australia) R Fromberg	3	2

Semifinals
1	(Russia) Y Kafelnikov	4	6	6
4/WC	(Ukraine) A Medvedev	6	4	3

=== Bottom half ===
First round
5	(Switzerland) M Rosset	6	6
(Uruguay) M Filippini	4	2
Q	(France) F Vitoux	1	4
Q	(Spain) R Carretero	6	6
(Austria) H Skoff	3	6
(Australia) M Woodforde	6	7
WC	(France) H Leconte	4	1
3	(Croatia) G Ivanišević	6	0^{r}
7	(Czech Republic) S Doseděl	4	3
(Italy) R Furlan	6	6
(Spain) T Carbonell	6	6
(France) O Delaître	3	0
WC	(France) T Guardiola	1	4
(Spain) F Clavet	6	6
(Spain) A Costa	6	6
2	(Spain) A Berasategui	7	6^{r}

Second round
5	(Switzerland) M Rosset	6	6
Q	(Spain) R Carretero	4	3
(Australia) M Woodforde	6	7
WC	(France) H Leconte	2	5
(Italy) R Furlan	4	4
(Spain) T Carbonell	6	6
(Spain) F Clavet	3	1
(Spain) A Costa	6	6

Quarterfinals
5	(Switzerland) M Rosset	7	6
(Australia) M Woodforde	6	2
(Spain) T Carbonell	6	6	4
(Spain) A Costa	7	4	6

Semifinals
5	(Switzerland) M Rosset	2	6	6
(Spain) A Costa	6	4	4
