= 2008 Indianapolis Tennis Championships – Doubles =

Doubles
- 2008 Indianapolis Tennis Championships

Final
- Champions: (Australia) Ashley Fisher (United States) Tripp Phillips
- Runners-up: (United States) Scott Lipsky (United States) David Martin
- Score: 3–6, 6–3, [10–5]

Events
Singles	Doubles
← 2007 ·	Indianapolis Tennis Championships	· 2009 →

Juan Martín del Potro and Travis Parrott were the defending champions, but chose not to participate that year.

Ashley Fisher and Tripp Phillips won in the final 3–6, 6–3, [10–5], against Scott Lipsky and David Martin.

== Seeds ==
1. (India) Mahesh Bhupathi / (India) Leander Paes (first round)
2. (Czech Republic) Martin Damm / (Czech Republic) Pavel Vízner (quarterfinals)
3. (Australia) Paul Hanley / (Australia) Jordan Kerr (quarterfinals)
4. (Russia) Igor Kunitsyn / (Russia) Dmitry Tursunov (first round)

== Draw ==
=== Key ===
- Q = Qualifier
- WC = Wild card
- LL = Lucky loser
- Alt = Alternate
- SE = Special exempt
- PR = Protected ranking
- ITF = ITF entry
- JE = Junior exempt
- w/o = Walkover
- r = Retired
- d = Defaulted
- SR = Special ranking

=== Draw ===
First round
1	(India) M Bhupathi (India) L Paes	4	6	[10]
WC	(Canada) D Nestor (Canada) F Niemeyer	6	3	[12]
(United States) S Lipsky (United States) D Martin	6	6
(Chinese Taipei) Y-h Lu (Denmark) K Pless	0	0
3	(Australia) P Hanley (Australia) J Kerr	4	6	[10]
(United States) J Blake (United States) S Querrey	6	3	[6]
(Israel) H Levy (United States) J Thomas	6	6
WC	(United States) B Battistone (United States) D Battistone	2	3
(France) N Mahut (France) G Simon	4	4
(Australia) A Fisher (United States) T Phillips	6	6
(India) R Bopanna (Pakistan) A-u-H Qureshi	2	7	[10]
4	(Russia) I Kunitsyn (Russia) D Tursunov	6	5	[6]
(Australia) C Guccione (United States) R Kendrick	6^{5}	6	[4]
(United States) R Ram (United States) B Reynolds	7^{7}	4	[10]
(Thailand) S Ratiwatana (Thailand) S Ratiwatana	5	3
2	(Czech Republic) M Damm (Czech Republic) P Vízner	7	6

Quarterfinals
WC	(Canada) D Nestor (Canada) F Niemeyer	1	6^{4}
(United States) S Lipsky (United States) D Martin	6	7^{7}
3	(Australia) P Hanley (Australia) J Kerr	4	6	[9]
(Israel) H Levy (United States) J Thomas	6	3	[11]
(Australia) A Fisher (United States) T Phillips	6	1
(India) R Bopanna (Pakistan) A-u-H Qureshi	2	0^{r}
(United States) R Ram (United States) B Reynolds	6	7^{7}
2	(Czech Republic) M Damm (Czech Republic) P Vízner	3	6^{4}

Semifinals
(United States) S Lipsky (United States) D Martin	7^{7}	7
(Israel) H Levy (United States) J Thomas	6^{4}	5
(Australia) A Fisher (United States) T Phillips	6	7^{7}
(United States) R Ram (United States) B Reynolds	4	6^{3}

Final
(United States) S Lipsky (United States) D Martin	6	3	[5]
(Australia) A Fisher (United States) T Phillips	3	6	[10]
