= 2008 Indianapolis Tennis Championships – Singles =

Singles
- 2008 Indianapolis Tennis Championships

Final
- Champion: (France) Gilles Simon
- Runner-up: (Russia) Dmitry Tursunov
- Score: 6–4, 6–4

Details
- Draw: 32 (4Q / 3WC)
- Seeds: 8

Events
Singles	Doubles
← 2007 ·	Indianapolis Tennis Championships	· 2009 →

Dmitry Tursunov was the defending champion, but second-seeded Gilles Simon defeated him 6–4, 6–4, in the final.

== Seeds ==
1. (United States) James Blake (semifinals)
2. (France) Gilles Simon (champion)
3. (Russia) Dmitry Tursunov (final)
4. (United States) Sam Querrey (semifinals)
5. (Germany) Tommy Haas (quarterfinals)
6. (France) Fabrice Santoro (first round)
7. (United States) Robby Ginepri (first round)
8. (Brazil) Thomaz Bellucci (first round)

== Draw ==
=== Key ===
- Q = Qualifier
- WC = Wild card
- LL = Lucky loser
- Alt = Alternate
- SE = Special exempt
- PR = Protected ranking
- ITF = ITF entry
- JE = Junior exempt
- w/o = Walkover
- r = Retired
- d = Defaulted
- SR = Special ranking

=== Finals ===
Semifinals
1	(United States) James Blake	6	3	4
3	(Russia) Dmitry Tursunov	4	6	6
4	(United States) Sam Querrey	3	6	4
2	(France) Gilles Simon	6	4	6

Final
3	(Russia) Dmitry Tursunov	4	4
2	(France) Gilles Simon	6	6

=== Top half ===
First round
1	(United States) J Blake	7^{7}	6
(Israel) D Sela	6^{2}	2
Q	(South Korea) W-s Jun	6	7^{7}
(Australia) C Guccione	4	6^{4}
(Chinese Taipei) Y-h Lu	7^{7}	7^{14}
Q	(United States) J O'Neal	6^{2}	6^{12}
WC	(United States) R Ram	7^{8}	6
6/WC	(France) F Santoro	6^{6}	4
3	(Russia) D Tursunov	6	7
(Russia) I Kunitsyn	3	5
(United States) W Odesnik	6	7
(Pakistan) A-u-H Qureshi	4	5
Q	(Australia) J Sirianni	6	1
Q	(Russia) M Ledovskikh	3	2^{r}
(Chile) P Capdeville	6	6
7	(United States) R Ginepri	4	2

Second round
1	(United States) J Blake	6	7
Q	(South Korea) W-s Jun	3	5
(Chinese Taipei) Y-h Lu	6	7^{7}
WC	(United States) R Ram	1	6^{1}
3	(Russia) D Tursunov	w/o
(United States) W Odesnik
Q	(Australia) J Sirianni	3	4
(Chile) P Capdeville	6	6

Quarterfinals
1	(United States) J Blake	6	6
(Chinese Taipei) Y-h Lu	2	0
3	(Russia) D Tursunov	3	6	6
(Chile) P Capdeville	6	3	1

Semifinals
1	(United States) J Blake	6	3	4
3	(Russia) D Tursunov	4	6	6

=== Bottom half ===
First round
8	(Brazil) T Bellucci	6	4	1
(Colombia) A Falla	3	6	6
(United States) B Reynolds	6^{6}	6	6
(Canada) F Dancevic	7^{8}	3	2
(United States) D Young	2	4
(United States) V Spadea	6	6
(Japan) G Soeda	4	4
4	(United States) S Querrey	6	6
5/WC	(Germany) T Haas	7^{7}	6
(United States) J Levine	6^{4}	2
(United States) J Isner	7	6
(United States) R Kendrick	5	4
(Denmark) K Pless	3	4
(Germany) B Becker	6	6
(France) N Mahut	2	6	3
2	(France) G Simon	6	3	6

Second round
(Colombia) A Falla	1	1
(United States) B Reynolds	6	6
(United States) V Spadea	6	3	4
4	(United States) S Querrey	4	6	6
5/WC	(Germany) T Haas	6	6
(United States) J Isner	3	4
(Germany) B Becker	5	6	0
2	(France) G Simon	7	3	6

Quarterfinals
(United States) B Reynolds	1	6	3
4	(United States) S Querrey	6	3	6
5/WC	(Germany) T Haas	6	4	2
2	(France) G Simon	4	6	6

Semifinals
4	(United States) S Querrey	3	6	4
2	(France) G Simon	6	4	6
