= 2010 Open de Nice Côte d'Azur =

- Date: 17–22 May
- Edition: 26th
- Category: ATP World Tour 250
- Draw: 28S / 16D
- Prize money: €398,250
- Surface: Clay / outdoor
- Location: Nice, France
- Venue: Nice Lawn Tennis Club

Champions

Singles
- (France) Richard Gasquet

Doubles
- (Brazil) Marcelo Melo / (Brazil) Bruno Soares
- Open de Nice Côte d'Azur

The 2010 Open de Nice Côte d'Azur was a men's tennis tournament play on outdoor clay courts. It was the 26th edition of the Open de Nice Côte d'Azur, and was part of the 250 series of the 2010 ATP World Tour. It took place at the Nice Lawn Tennis Club in Nice, France, from 17 May through 22 May 2010. Unseeded Richard Gasquet won the singles title.

== Finals ==
=== Singles ===
(France) Richard Gasquet defeated (Spain) Fernando Verdasco, 6–3, 5–7, 7–6^{(7–5)}

=== Doubles ===
(Brazil) Marcelo Melo / (Brazil) Bruno Soares defeated (India) Rohan Bopanna / (Pakistan) Aisam-ul-Haq Qureshi, 1–6, 6–3, [10–5]

== Entrants ==
=== Seeds ===
Player	Nationality	Ranking*	Seeding
Robin Söderling	Sweden	7	1
Fernando Verdasco	Spain	9	2
Gaël Monfils	France	18	3
Thomaz Bellucci	Brazil	26	4
Marcos Baghdatis	Cyprus	28	5
Albert Montañés	Spain	33	6
Michael Berrer	Germany	43	7
Łukasz Kubot	Poland	53	8

- Seedings are based on the rankings of May 10, 2010.

=== Other entrants ===
The following players received wildcards into the main draw:

- (Croatia) Mario Ančić
- (France) Arnaud Clément
- Juan Manuel Díaz C
- (France) Gianni Mina

The following players received entry from the qualifying draw:

- (Belgium) Steve Darcis
- (France) David Guez
- (France) Adrian Mannarino
- (Ukraine) Illya Marchenko

The following player received the lucky loser spot:

- (France) Laurent Recouderc
