= Aisam-ul-Haq Qureshi =

Pakistani tennis player (born 1980)

Aisam-ul-Haq Qureshi اعصام الحق قریشی
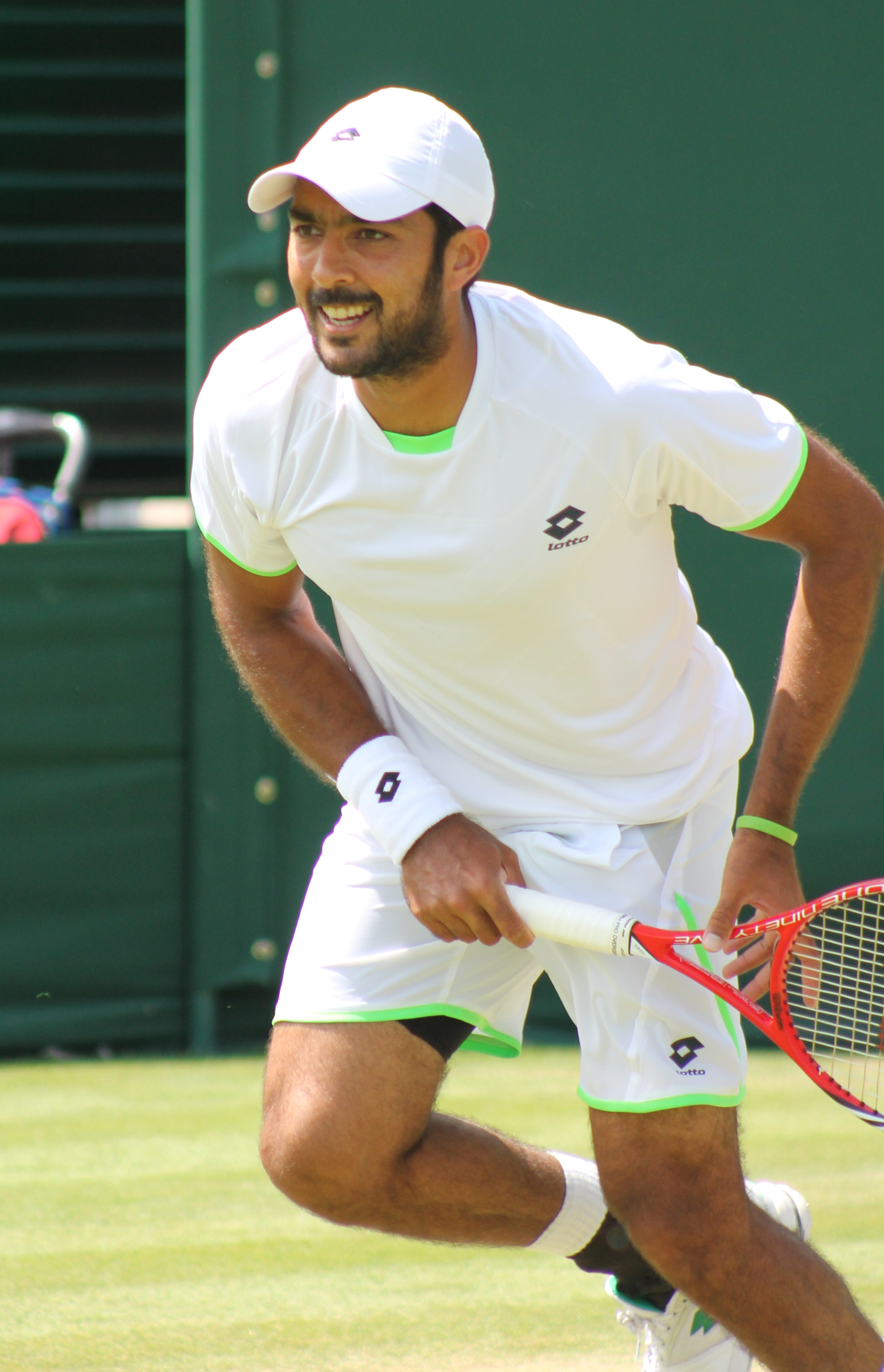
- Qureshi at the 2013 Wimbledon Championships
- Country (sports): Pakistan
- Born: 18 March 1980 (age 46) Lahore, Punjab, Pakistan
- Height: 1.83 m (6 ft 0 in)
- Turned pro: 1998
- Retired: 2025 (ATP Tour)
- Plays: Right-handed (one-handed backhand)
- Prize money: US$3,721,648

Singles
- Career record: 35–30
- Career titles: 0
- Highest ranking: No. 125 (10 December 2007)

Grand Slam singles results
- Australian Open: Q2 (2002)
- Wimbledon: 2R (2007)
- US Open: 1R (2008)

Doubles
- Career record: 394–358
- Career titles: 18
- Highest ranking: No. 8 (6 June 2011)

Grand Slam doubles results
- Australian Open: QF (2018)
- French Open: SF (2012)
- Wimbledon: QF (2010)
- US Open: F (2010)

Grand Slam mixed doubles results
- Australian Open: QF (2012, 2014, 2022)
- French Open: SF (2013, 2019)
- Wimbledon: SF (2014, 2016)
- US Open: F (2010)
Medal record
Men's Tennis
Representing Pakistan
South Asian Games
Bronze medal – third place	2016 Guwahati	Singles
Bronze medal – third place	2016 Guwahati	Mixed Doubles
Islamic Solidarity Games
Gold medal – first place	2005 Mecca	Singles
Gold medal – first place	2005 Mecca	Doubles
Gold medal – first place	2005 Mecca	Team
- Last updated on: 14 November 2025.

Aisam-ul-Haq Qureshi PP SI (Punjabi, Urdu: اعصام الحق قریشی; born 17 March 1980) is a Pakistani former professional tennis player who specialized in doubles. He is the only Pakistani player ever to reach a Grand Slam final, having done so in both men's and mixed doubles at the 2010 US Open, alongside Rohan Bopanna and Květa Peschke respectively. Qureshi also reached seven further major semifinals across the two disciplines. He reached his career-high doubles ranking of world No. 8 in June 2011, and has won 18 titles on the ATP Tour, including the 2011 Paris Masters and 2013 Miami Open, with Bopanna and Jean-Julien Rojer respectively. Qureshi also qualified for the ATP Finals in doubles on three occasions.

In singles, he reached his highest ranking of world No. 125 in December 2007, and achieved his best Grand Slam result at the Wimbledon Championships that year, reaching the second round. Qureshi is also the most successful Davis Cup player in Pakistan's history, with the team most notably reaching the World Group play-offs in 2005, being defeated by Chile. He has played in the competition since 1998 and has won more matches for Pakistan than any other player, additionally being appointed captain of the team in 2022. Qureshi and Aqeel Khan have regularly spearheaded Pakistan's Davis Cup campaigns, partnering each other in doubles and also competing in singles matches. He recently started a talent-hunting program to find the best tennis players in Pakistan. He has also currently serving as the President of the Pakistan Tennis Federation since February 2024. Qureshi retired from ATP Tour events in November 2025, but is still a member of Pakistan Davis Cup team.

== Early life ==
Aisam-ul-Haq Qureshi was born in a Punjabi family and grew up in Lahore, Pakistan; swimming, playing cricket and football being his favorite pastimes at his alma-mater Crescent Model Higher Secondary School. He started playing tennis relatively late, aged 14, when his maternal grandfather and first coach, Khawaja Iftikhar Ahmed, a former 10-time national champion, took him to a tennis club in Model Town, Lahore.

Khawaja Iftikhar Ahmed was the All-India champion in British India before Pakistan's Independence in 1947. His mother, Nosheen Ihtsham, was also a former women's tennis champion. At age 16, the ITF sponsored him for two years. He won the Pakistan International Junior Championships and went on to win the Casablanca Cup in Mexico and the LTA International Junior Championships in Roehampton, where he beat Olivier Rochus, Andy Ram, and Taylor Dent. In the World Super Junior Championships, he beat Andy Roddick. By 18, he was a top-20 junior player and decided to turn pro.

Aisam was educated at the University of Punjab.

== Coaches ==
As a junior, he was coached by LTA. Aisam has been coached by American Robert Davis since 1998. Robert Davis has served as national coach for Peru, Panama, Thailand, and Indonesia. As a writer, he contributes to the ATP's Deuce Magazine, Tennis Magazine USA, tennis.com, Tennis Magazine Australia, and ITF publications, as well as non-sporting publications and newspapers.

== Playing style ==
Qureshi prefers the quicker grass courts and has seen his greatest success on grass and hard courts. His playing style is serve-and-volley, relying on his serve to win him points by putting pressure on his opponents.

== Sponsorship ==
Qureshi's clothing and shoe sponsor is Lotto. On 29 March 2008, Aisam signed an agreement with Pepsi for sponsorship of a coach for one year. He became the first Pakistani sportsman who wasn't a cricketer to star in a Pepsi advert and become one of their brand ambassadors.

== Awards and accolades ==
Ribbon	Decoration	Country	Year
	Pride of Performance	Pakistan	2004
	Sitara-e-Imtiaz	Pakistan	2010

Qureshi teamed with Israeli player Amir Hadad during Wimbledon and the US Open tournaments in 2002. He is now a member of the "Champions for Peace" club, a group of 54 athletes committed to serving peace in the world through sport, created by Peace and Sport, a Monaco-based international organization.

In November 2010 Aisam was appointed The United Nations Development Program (UNDP) goodwill ambassador.

Aisam was awarded the Arthur Ashe Humanitarian of the Year, in 2010 along with his doubles tennis partner Rohan Bopanna of India. Along with Bopanna, Qureshi received the 2010 "Peace and Sport Image of the Year" award, in recognition of their dedicated efforts to spread the message of peace through sport. Qureshi and his doubles partner Bopanna also created a campaign, "Stop War Start Tennis", with their goal of playing a match on the border of India and Pakistan.

Aisam-ul-Haq Qureshi has received numerous national and international honors throughout his career. He was conferred with the Pride of Performance, one of Pakistan's highest civilian awards, on 14 August 2004, and later received the Sitara-e-Imtiaz (Star of Excellence) in 2010. He was also given the Pakistan President's Award for Performance in 2002, the Salam Pakistan Youth Award by the President of Pakistan in 2007, and was runner-up for the 2003 Anne Frank Award For Moral Courage by the Anne Frank Trust, UK.

In 2011, he was awarded Lux Style Award for Most Stylish Sports Person. Being high-profile tennis star of Pakistan and alumni, he was invited to Crescent Model Higher Secondary School for groundbreaking ceremony of Tennis courts in school.

== Career ==
=== Juniors ===
Qureshi played his first junior match in August 1995 at the age of 15 at a grade 5 tournament in Syria hand ad a successful career in junior tennis, finishing no. 7 in the world in 1998, which made him Pakistan's highest-ranked player ever in the international youth tennis arena. Qureshi turned pro in 1998.

Junior Grand Slam results - Singles:

Australian Open: 1R (1997, 1998)
French Open: 2R (1998)
Wimbledon: 3R (1998)
US Open: 1R (1997, 1998)

Junior Grand Slam results - Doubles:

Australian Open: QF (1998)
French Open: QF (1998)
Wimbledon: QF (1998)
US Open: QF (1998)

=== 1998: Turning pro and making his Davis Cup debut ===
On 25 September, he played and won his first Davis Cup match against Danai Udomchoke. Paired with Mohamed-Khaliq Siddiq, he won the doubles match. They helped Pakistan beat Thailand 3–2 for the Asia/Oceania Zone Group II Final and gained promotion to Group I.

On 28 September, he played his first pro match and got into the doubles final of a Futures tournament in Japan. His singles career also started well, getting into two Futures quarterfinals in Pakistan and Japan, and ended the year ranked no. 779.

=== 1999: Challenger Tour debut ===
Aisam made it into the quarterfinals of his first Challenger tournament in Calcutta but lost to Indian Leander Paes. At the Davis Cup Asia/Oceania Zone Group I quarterfinal match against Uzbekistan, Pakistan lost 4–1, with Aisam winning the only rubber. Paired with Dmitri Tomashevich, he won two doubles Futures titles in Turkey.

In the Davis Cup Asia/Oceania I Relegation Play-off final, China defeated Pakistan 3–0, which saw them relegated back to Group II. In October, Qureshi went on to win his first Futures singles tournament on the hard courts of Indonesia, beating Danai Udomchoke. In Vietnam, Aisam won a doubles Futures title with Mark Nielsen. This was followed up by another singles Futures win in Bangladesh on clay, winning in straight sets. Aisam ended the year ranked no. 365 in singles, and no. 355 in doubles.

=== 2000: Top 250 debut in doubles ===
In January, he took Pakistan to a 3–2 victory against Hong Kong Asia/Oceania Group II quarter-final. Aisam then began to compete in more on the Challenger circuit, reaching the semi-finals at the Indian Oil Servo Cup in Calcutta in February, defeated by Tuomas Ketola. At the Davis Cup Group II semi-final Pakistan was beaten by Chinese Taipei 3–2, with Aisam winning two of his three rubbers. In May, paired with Dmitri Tomashevich, he reached the semis of the Samarkand Challenger in Samarkand, Uzbekistan. At The LTA Manchester Challenger, in Manchester, UK, Aisam made it to the semi-finals with partner Jamie Delgado.

In July, he took part in the Ted Open, in Istanbul, Turkey, where he made it to the quarter-finals, but was beaten by Oleg Ogorodov 4–6, 7–5, 6–3. Returning to the UK, he played at the LTA Men's Challenger in Wrexham, where he, along with Italian Daniele Bracciali, won in the final 6–4, 6–2. With that Aisam also won his first Challenger doubles title.

He won a futures doubles title in France with Israeli Noam Behr. Together, they participated at the Bukhara Challenger, in Bukhara, Uzbekistan, where they reached the final. Aisam won a futures single title in Vietnam, beating Jaroslav Levinský 3–6, 6–2, 6–3, and at the same tournament won a doubles title with Ashley Fisher. Aisam ended the year winning at the Neride Prague Indoor in Prague, Czech Republic where he partnered Kristian Pless.

He finished the year 2000 ranked 261st in singles and 211th in doubles.

=== 2001 ===
Aisam participated in his first ATP tournament at the Chennai Open in Chennai, India, with his partner Vadim Kutsenko of Uzbekistan. They won against Czech pair Petr Kovačka and Pavel Kudrnáč 6–1, 6–7^{(3)}, 6–4. However they were knocked out by Zimbabweans Byron Black and Wayne Black 2–6, 0–6. At the Davis Cup, he was unable to help Pakistan as they lost to Chinese Taipei in the Asia/Oceania Group II quarter-final 3–2. He went to Mumbai, India to play in the MTNL ATP Challenger where he reached the doubles semi-final with Dennis van Scheppingen. At the Heineken Challenger in Ho Chi Minh City, Vietnam, he again made it to the doubles semis, this time paired with Denis Golovanov.

In April at the Davis Cup Relegation Play-off semi-final, he helped Pakistan defeat Syria 5–0. The Fergana Challenger, in Fergana, Uzbekistan, still with Golovanov, they made it to the semi-finals but failed again to progress further. In the UK, he played at The Wrexham Challenger in Wrexham; he progressed to the singles semi-final but was knocked out by Ladislav Švarc 2–6, 6–2, 6–3. Although he did reach his first Challenger level doubles final of the year, now with a new partner Luke Bourgeois they fell at the final hurdle.

Asiam returned to Uzbekistan to take part in the Samarkand Challenger in Samarkand, where he made it to the quarter-finals in the singles, and with partner Kirill Ivanov-Smolensky, the doubles semi-final. He stayed in Uzbekistan to play at the Bukhara Challenger, in Bukhara, and with his Dutch partner Rogier Wassen, they won the final 6–2, 6–4.

He won a single futures title in Thailand, beating Yeu-Tzuoo Wang 6–4, 4–6, 7–5. This followed a second in Vietnam against Yen-Hsun Lu. He rounded off the year with a doubles challenger title with Jaroslav Levinský at the 69th King's Cup in Bangkok, Thailand. Aisam ended the year ranked 251st in singles and 170th in doubles.

=== 2002 ===
In February at the Davis Cup, he won both matches, as Pakistan beat Malaysia 4–1. In the next Davis Cup tie against Chinese Taipei, he won all three rubbers as Pakistan qualified for the Asia/Oceania Group II final. Aisam won a doubles futures title in Kuwait with Tuomas Ketola. At the Fergana Challenger, in Fergana, Uzbekistan, he and Ketola were unable to win in the doubles final.

Asiam qualified for his first Grand Slam at Wimbledon with doubles partner Amir Hadad. This pairing caused much controversy. In the first round they beat Martín Rodríguez and Tom Vanhoudt 7–5, 7–6^{(5)}, 7–6^{(2)}. In the second round, the Pakistani-Israeli pairing caused an upset when they knocked out 11th seeds Ellis Ferreira and Rick Leach 6–4, 6–4 6–4 to make it to the third round. They were finally beaten by seventh-seed Czechs Martin Damm and Cyril Suk. Aisam was threatened with expulsion from the Davis Cup by the Pakistan Tennis Federation. Although Aisam did have support from Pakistan's Davis Cup captain. Aisam said, "I don't like religion or politics to interfere with sport. We're not here to change anything – politics and governments do that. We're just here to play the game and enjoy it." The ITF eventually intervened, forcing the PTF to rescind their threat.

At the West of England Tennis tournament in Bristol, UK, he won his first Challenger doubles title of the season with Dejan Petrovic. Next, at The Manchester Trophy in Manchester, UK, he won the doubles title with Karol Beck, although he was beaten by Beck in the singles semi-final. Asiam took his third doubles challenger title in a row when with Stefano Pescosolido he took the Hilversum Open title in Hilversum, Netherlands. In July at Wrexham, UK in the Wrexham Challenger, his doubles winning streak was broken when he lost the final with Daniele Bracciali. He also reached the singles quarter-finals.

He partnered Hadad again at the US Open, where they defeated Mariano Hood and Sebastián Prieto 6–4, 6–2 in the first round. In the second round, they faced fifth seeds Wayne Black and Kevin Ullyett losing 4–6, 6–4, 2–6. In September, Aisam returned to Davis Cup action when Pakistan overcame China 3–2 to be promoted to Asia/Oceania Group I. However, he picked up an injury and missed the rest of the season. Despite this, Aisam ended the season ranked 265th in singles and 102nd in doubles.

=== 2003 ===
Aisam and Amir Hadad picked up the ATP's Arthur Ashe Humanitarian Award. ATP chief executive Mark Miles said, "During a summer when fear and hatred garnered much of the headlines, Amir and Aisam-ul-Haq provided much-needed relief with their simple message about tolerance through tennis." Aisam, partnering with Hadad, participated at the Milan Indoor in Milan, Italy, where they were knocked out of the first round by third seeds Tomáš Cibulec and Pavel Vízner, 6–7^{(8)}, 1–6. At the Asia/Oceania Group I quarter-final, Pakistan were beaten 5–0 by New Zealand. Aisam went to Germany to play at the Warsteiner Challenger in Wolfsburg, where he reached the final with Austrian Alexander Peya.

He went to play at his second ATP tournament of the year, partnered with Hadad, at the Copenhagen Open. They lost to George Bastl and David Prinosil 5–7, 3–6. In May, Aisam won a doubles futures title in Uzbekistan with partner Justin Bower. They stayed together in the country to play at the Fergana Challenger in Fergana where they won the doubles title. This victory saw Aisam reach 89th in the world for doubles rankings.

At the French Open, he played with Daniel Vacek, but they exited in the first round at the hands of Rick Leach and Brian MacPhie 3–6, 3–6. At Wimbledon he and Hadad were beaten in the first round to Jiří Novák and Radek Štěpánek 6–7^{(5)}, 5–7, 5–7.

Asiam Partnered Rohan Bopanna at the Manchester Trophy in Manchester, UK, where they reached the semi-finals. They went all the way to the final and won the Colorado Classic in Denver, US. Returning to Davis Cup action in September, he helped save Pakistan from relegation as they beat South Korea 3–2. With his singles ranking sliding, Aisam concentrated on playing singles matches, winning three future titles, one in Thailand and two in India. He also won two doubles future titles in India to round off the year, the first with Harsh Mankad and the second with Mustafa Ghouse.

Aisam ended the year ranked 493rd in singles and 187th in doubles.

=== 2004 ===
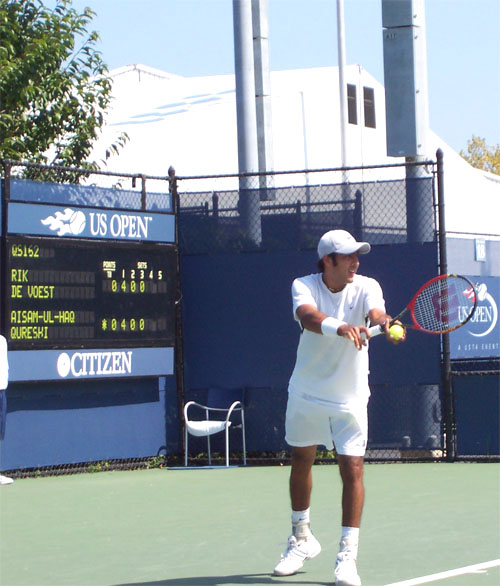
Aisam at the U.S. Open Qualifying

Aisam won a single futures title in India in February. He then reached The Wrexham Challenger doubles semi-finals with Vladimir Voltchkov. Aisam went on to win the IX Challenger Internacional de Salinas in Salinas, Ecuador with doubles partner Federico Browne. Next, at the USTA Challenger of Calabasas in Calabasas, USA with partner Cecil Mamiit, he reached the semis. At the Fergana Challenger in Fergana, Uzbekistan, he paired up with Harsh Mankad to reach the final. In Saudi Arabia, he won another singles futures title.

In June, Aisam played his first singles ATP tournament at The Nottingham Open in Nottingham and was beaten in the first round by Jonas Björkman in straight sets. He then paired up with Luxembourg's Gilles Müller and won at the XI Open International D'Andorra in Andorra. Aisam then took part in the Open de Montauban in Montauban, France, where he and Mankad reached the semi-finals. At The LTA Nottingham Challenger in Nottingham, UK, they both again reached the semis. Next, at The Manchester Trophy in Manchester, UK he partnered Lovro Zovko to the final.

Aisam reached the singles challenger semi-finals at the Arroyo de la Encomienda in Valladolid, Spain. In the same tournament, he reached the doubles final with Michael Ryderstedt. After missing the previous tie, Aisam took part in the Davis Cup relegation play-off final against favorites New Zealand. He assisted Pakistan in causing a huge upset when they won 3–2 to stay in Asia/Oceania Group I. He travelled to Nigeria and won another singles future title. In his final event of the season, Aisam partnered Jason Marshall to the Audi Challenger semi-final held in Groningen, Netherlands. Aisam finished the season ranked 199th in singles and 136th in doubles.

=== 2005 ===
In Wolfsburg, Germany, Aisam played at the Volkswagen Challenger, where partnered by Lovro Zovko, he reached the final. At the Davis Cup Pakistan defeated Thailand, with Aisam beating Paradorn Srichaphan 7–5, 2–6, 6–4, 6–4. Going to the Heineken Challenger at Ho Chi Minh City, Vietnam, he reached his second final, this time with Orest Tereshchuk, but they failed to win the final. Aisam went to Mecca, Saudi Arabia to represent Pakistan at the Islamic Solidarity Games where he won 3 Golds in the singles, doubles, and team events. At the Davis Cup, he won all his rubbers as Pakistan beat Chinese Taipei to reach the World Group play-offs for the first time.

He returned to action in the Fergana Challenger, in Fergana, Uzbekistan, with Tereshchuk where they reached the semis. He travelled to Surbiton, UK to play at the first grass court event of the season at The Surbiton Trophy, where with Stephen Huss he made it to the semi-final. Aisam stayed in Europe to play at the Arpa Ceramic Cup in Reggio Emilia, Italy, and reached another doubles semi-final, with Mustafa Ghouse. Returning to the UK, he played at The LTA Summer Challenger, in Nottingham, UK for his third doubles final, paired with Jean-Michel Pequery, but Aisam still failed to win a final.

There was more struggling for Aisam at the III Challenger Diursa in Valladolid, Spain, where with Igor Zelenay, he could only get to the doubles semi-final. However, Aisam stayed in Spain to take part at the Open de Tenis Amaya in Pamplona, wherewith Zovko, they won the final and gave Aisam his first doubles Challenger title of the year. He continued his partnership with Zovko as they went to Uzbekistan to play at the Samarkand Challenger in Samarkand, but fell at the semi-final.

Pakistan faced Chile in the World Group play-offs. Aisam lost to Nicolás Massú 2–6, 6–7^{(4)}, 1–6, and then with Aqeel Khan in the doubles, they were beaten by Massu and Fernando González 1–6, 3–6, 0–6 as Pakistan fell to a 5–0 loss. In December, Asiam won a singles futures title in India. He ended the year ranked 450th in singles and 168th in doubles.

=== 2006 ===
Aisam played at the Davis Cup where he wasn't able to help Pakistan, as they lost to Chinese Taipei 3–2. He travelled to the UK where he won a doubles futures title with Jean-François Bachelot.

At the Davis Cup, Pakistan was beaten by India, despite Aisam winning both his matches. The season continued to be a struggle, however, in June he made it to only his second-ever ATP tournament at the Ordina Open in 's-Hertogenbosch, Netherlands, losing out to third seed Mario Ančić, 6–7^{(3)}, 7–6, 5–7, in a closely fought match.

He finally reached his first Challenger final of the year at the Bukhara Challenger, in Bukhara, Uzbekistan, reaching the doubles final with Indian Rohan Bopanna, but lost in straight sets. Aisam returned to Davis Cup action, but Pakistan fell to their third loss of the year, losing to China. This saw them relegated back to Asia/Oceania Group II.

Going to India, he took part in the ATP tournament there, at the Kingfisher Airlines Tennis Open in Mumbai, and paired up with Leander Paes. They beat Paraguay's Ramón Delgado and Greek Konstantinos Economidis 6–4, 6–4. But they lost the quarter-final to third seeds and eventual champions Mario Ančić and Indian Mahesh Bhupathi 6–1, 7–5. In the first Indo-Pak tennis series, he and Aqeel Khan were beaten in the 5 rubber tournament 3–2. He stayed in India to play on the futures circuit, where he won a single futures title. At the 2006 Asian Games in Doha, Qatar, Aisam reached the singles third round. In the doubles, he and Aqeel Khan progressed to the quarter-finals where they were beaten by first seeds and eventual champions Mahesh Bhupathi and Leander Paes 2–6, 4–6. In the team event, they were knocked out in the first round. In December, Aisam was declared ITF player of the month. Aisam ended the year ranked 417th in singles and 365th in doubles.

=== 2007 ===
Aisam started in 2007 playing in a number of Futures tournaments. He won two doubles titles in the UK, one with Stéphane Robert and the second with Purav Raja. Aisam won two more doubles titles with Jamie Baker. He went to the UAE where he won a single futures title and two doubles titles with partner Rameez Junaid. In Kuwait, Aisam won another single and doubles title, this time with Purav Raja. He qualified at the ATP tournament in Halle, Germany, for the Gerry Weber Open where he beat World number 11, and Wimbledon Semi-finalist Richard Gasquet, 7–6^{(10)}, 6–4, which has been the biggest victory of his career to date. Aisam was knocked out in the second round by Philipp Kohlschreiber 4–6, 3–6.

He went on to achieve a landmark in his professional career by qualifying for the first time for the main rounds of Wimbledon 2007 Men's Singles competition. Aisam became the first Pakistani in over 31 years to play at a Grand Slam tournament and the second Pakistani to reach the second round of Wimbledon. He won his first Grand Slam match at Wimbledon against Lee Childs, 6–3, 6–4, 7–6, making him the second Pakistani player (the first being Haroon Rahim in 1976) to reach the second round of Wimbledon, before losing to Marat Safin 2–6, 4–6 and 6–7 ^{(4–7)}.

At the Campbell's Hall of Fame Championships at Newport, he continued his good form as he defeated first seed Mardy Fish 6–3, 6–4. In the second round, he beat Nathan Healey 7–6^{(2)}, 5–7, 6–4, to reach the last 8 of an ATP tournament for the first time. However, at the quarter-final, Asiam was beaten by Dick Norman, 4–6, 6–3, 4–6. In the doubles, Asiam and Prakash Amritraj were knocked out of the first round by Wesley Moodie and Fabrice Santoro 0–6, 4–6.

Aisam followed up Newport with the Challenger Series tournament in the UK at the LTA Manchester Trophy in Manchester and then The LTA Nottingham Challenger in Nottingham. Aisam secured the doubles title with Rohan Bopanna at Manchester. His red-hot streak continued as he powered into the singles final at Nottingham, only to be bested by Australian Alun Jones 3–6, 6–4, 4–6. Aisam did however win back-to-back doubles titles by succeeding in the doubles final at Nottingham with Bopanna. At the Castilla and León Open Challenger Series tournament in Segovia, Spain, his failure at singles did not seem to trouble Aisam, as he went on to lift his third consecutive doubles Challenger victory with partner Rohan Bopanna. The duo became known as the "Indo-Pak Express". Aisam returned home and picked up the "Salaam Pakistan Awards" alongside footballer Muhammad Essa and squash player Maria Toor Pakay.

Aisam then traveled to the US to take part in the GHI Bronx Tennis Classic Challenger Series in Bronx to play in the doubles competition. Aisam and Bopanna continued their dominance in the doubles game, as they prepared for the US Open, by winning the hard-court challenger, and in the process, forming a 16-match winning streak that spanned four tournaments. In doing so, Aisam won his 50th title including both singles and doubles at all levels.

To fulfill his dream of playing at the US Open, Aisam needed to win three qualifying matches. He started strongly, advancing to the third qualifying round where he met Scoville Jenkins of the US. Aisam pulled out before the third set due to a bout of tendinitis.

Although not fully fit, Aisam returned in time to play at the Kingfisher Airlines Open in Mumbai, his fourth ATP tournament of the year. It was also the first time Aisam was in the first-round draw without needing to qualify or receiving a wildcard. Despite being the highest-ranking Asian in the tournament, he was defeated in the first round by Serbian Viktor Troicki 6–2, 6–4. Aisam also resumed his partnership with Bopanna and easily won their first-round encounter, beating Indian duo Stephen Amritraj and Somdev Devvarman 6–3, 6–2. In the quarters, they faced Iván Navarro Pastor and Sergio Roitman, who pulled out, allowing Aisam to reach his first ATP semi-final. The Qureshi-Bopanna partnership beat Lars Burgsmüller and Olivier Rochus, 6–2, 6–3. In Aisam's first career ATP tournament final, the duo faced third seeds Robert Lindstedt and Jarkko Nieminen, but lost, 6–7^{(3)}, 6–7^{(5)}. This loss ended their 19-match win streak.

At the Tarka Challenger in Barnstaple, UK, Aisam teamed up with Frederik Nielsen and won the tournament. As his singles ranks rose into the top 150, making him the third-best Asian player, he took part in the second Indo-Pak tennis series. He and Aqeel Khan were beaten in the 3-rubber first leg 2–1 but won the second leg 2–1 to tie the series. Returning to the Challenger circuit at the Malaysian Open in Kuala Lumpur, Malaysia, he was runner-up with Bopanna in the doubles. Aisam went to New Delhi, India to play in the second to last Challenger event of the year, though he lost the doubles final with Boanna, he won his first Challenger singles title with a victory against surprise finalist Jae Sung An 7–5, 6–4 and with that reaching the top 130. Asiam spent the rest of December in India to prepare for the following season, with Sania Mirza, Mahesh Bhupathi, and Rohan Bopanna. Aisam ended the year ranked 125th in singles and 90th in doubles.

=== 2008 ===
Aisam began the season at the Chennai Open in Chennai, India. He missed the singles qualifiers due to unrest in Pakistan but made it in time to play doubles alongside Croat Marin Čilić. They defeated first-round opponents Mustafa Ghouse and Karan Rastogi both from India, 6–4, 7–6^{(1)}. In the quarter-finals, they faced second seeds Jaroslav Levinský and Michal Mertiňák, who they overcame 6–1, 7–5. In the semis they were beaten by eventual title winners Sanchai Ratiwatana, and Sonchat Ratiwatana from Thailand 6–2, 2–6, 4–10. His doubles ranking rose to a new high of 82nd. Coincidentally, the Qureshi-Cilic partnership entered the 2008 doubles race ranked ninth. Qureshi entered the qualification draw for men's singles at the 2008 Australian Open. He was seeded 16 but lost in the first round in a tight three-set match. Back on the Challenger circuit, Aisam teamed up with Igor Kunitsyn and reached the Heilbronn Open final in Heilbronn, Germany.

Aisam went to the US to play at the Delray Beach International Tennis Championships. With Bobby Reynolds they beat Amer Delic and Rajeev Ram 6–1, 6–7^{(3)} 10–5. In the quarter-finals, they lost to first seeds and world number ones Bob Bryan and Mike Bryan 4–6, 4–6. He then paired up with longtime doubles partner Bopanna at the SAP Open in San Jose, and was knocked out of the first round by third seeds Max Mirnyi and Jamie Murray 4–6, 4–6.

Aisam and Bopanna were given wildcards for the Dubai Tennis Championships and defeated Paul-Henri Mathieu and Igor Andreev 7–5, 6–4 in the first round. In the quarter-finals, they squandered a one-set advantage against first seeds Daniel Nestor and Nenad Zimonjić, losing 2–6, 7–6^{(5)}, 10–6. Aisam was called up to the Pakistan Davis Cup squad and prepared for the hectic Asia/Oceania Group III schedule. During the Davis Cup, he was inspired form, as Pakistan won each tie 3–0 to gain promotion back to Asia/Oceania Group II. He went to Lanzarote, Spain, and reached the doubles final of the VII Open Isla de Lanzarote with Gilles Müller, but were beaten 2–6, 6–7, however, this saw his doubles ranking rise to 67th.

Then in New Delhi, India, Aisam took part in the New Delhi Challenger and was knocked out in the quarter-finals to World No. 78 Yen-Hsun Lu 7–6, 3–6, 5–7. He teamed up with Bopanna for the French Open where in a tough first-round draw they took on first seeds Bob Bryan and Mike Bryan for the second time in a year, but lost 1–6, 4–6. They both moved on to Wimbledon and knocked out Polish tenth seeds Mariusz Fyrstenberg and Marcin Matkowski 6–3, 7–5, 6–4. In the second round, they lost to Marcel Granollers-Pujol and Santiago Ventura Bertomeu 2–6, 4–6, 2–6.

He went to play a Challenger in Dublin, Ireland, and with Prakash Amritraj they beat Jonathan Marray and Frederik Nielsen in the doubles final 6–3, 7–6. Aisam returned to the US to play at the Campbell's Hall of Fame Championships where he took on Benjamin Becker in the singles first round and won 7–5, 7–6. In the second round, he was defeated by second seed and defending champion Fabrice Santoro 6–7, 2–6. In the doubles, he and Bopanna were seeded fourth, the first time both have been seeded in an ATP event. In the first round, they beat Tripp Phillips and Jim Thomas 4–6, 6–3, 10–2. They won their quarterfinal 7–6, 3–6, 10–7 Kevin Anderson and James Cerretani and followed that up by defeating Rik de Voest and Ashley Fisher in the semis 5–7, 6–4, 11–9. In the second ATP doubles final of his career, they faced Mardy Fish and John Isner, but despite being favorites, they lost 4–6, 6–7.

They then went to Indianapolis where Aisam lost his first round singles match to Wayne Odesnik 4–6, 5–7. In the doubles, he and Bopanna defeated fourth seeds Igor Kunitsyn and Dmitry Tursunov 2–6, 7–5, 10–6. In the second round Bopanna picked up an injury and retired at 2–6, 0–1 against eventual champions Ashley Fisher and Tripp Phillips. Aisam went back to playing challengers to Belo Horizonte, Brazil to play at the lBH Tenis Open International Cup 2008 where he reached the singles quarter-finals and in the doubles, he and Mexican Santiago González won the title. In Campos do Jordão, at the Credicard Citi MasterCard Tennis Cup, Aisam was defeated in the semi-finals in both singles and doubles. He and Bopanna played at the 2008 Legg Mason Tennis Classic they were defeated in the first round by third seeds Rik de Voest and Ashley Fisher 4–6, 4–6.

Aisam took part in the US Open. In the Singles he faced former World No. 1 and French Open champion Carlos Moyà in the first round but lost 4–6, 7–6, 6–7, 2–6. In the Doubles he and Bopanna opened against Marc Gicquel and Sébastien Grosjean, losing 5–7, 3–6. He then appeared in the Thailand Open, losing in the first round to Swedish sixth seed Robin Söderling 2–6, 4–6. In the doubles, he and Bopanna lost 6–7, 6–4, 7–10 to first seeds Lukáš Dlouhý and Leander Paes. Then in the Stockholm Open, Aisam teamed up with Mario Ančić, however, they were unable to get past the first round, losing to first seeds Jonas Björkman and Kevin Ullyett 5–7, 4–6.

He traveled to Kolding, Denmark to play in the Kobstaedernes ATP Challenger, reaching the doubles semi-finals before going on to Russia to take part in St. Petersburg Open where he partnered Rogier Wassen, but they lost to Igor Kunitsyn and Marat Safin 3–6, 6–2 9–11 in the first round.

Aisam then went to play in Challenger in Yokohama, Japan at the Keio Challenger International Tennis Tournament where he reached the singles quarterfinals, losing to former Asian number 1 and World No. 36 Hyung-Taik Lee 6–4, 4–6, 4–6. The Pakistani rounded off the year with a win in the Dunlop Challenger in Toyota, Japan alongside Frederik Nielsen.

=== 2009 ===
Aisam played in a future event in Sheffield, England, as the second seed. Aisam beat British Timothy Bradshaw in the first round 6–4, 6–0 but lost 6–4, 6–2 to Matthew Illingworth in the second.

Aisam lost to Matthias Bachinger in the first round of qualifying in the Heilbronn Challenger in Germany 7–6^{(4)}, 2–6, 3–6, and also lost in the first round of doubles with James Auckland. Next week, Aisam went to the Wrocław Challenger but lost in the second round of qualifying. Teaming up with Auckland again, he lost in the second round of the doubles.

Aisam went to the qualifying rounds in the Belgrade Challenger but lost in the first round to Julian Reister 7–5, 5–7, 4–6, Aisam was a break up in the second set and he also missed a match point in the tenth game of the second set as Reister was serving to stay in the match. Aisam teamed up with Lovro Zovko in the Doubles they lost in the final 6–3, 2–6 8–10. Aisam teamed up with Prakash Amritraj in the Dubai Championship but lost in the first round.

Aisam played in Pakistan's win over Oman in the Davis Cup which they won 4–1. Aisam won his first rubber and he won the Doubles match with Aqeel Khan, but did not play in the dead rubbers.

Back on the Challenger Circuit, Aisam traveled to Kyoto, Japan where he beat Chris Guccione in the first round 7–6^{(3)}, 6–4. He played I. Dodig in the second round, Aisam lost 5–7, 1–6, hurting his ankle during the match, but recovered to play in his Doubles Match. Aisam claimed the Doubles Title in Kyoto with partner M. Slanar. Aisam partnered with R. Bopanna in the Bangkok Challenger and they reached the semi-finals but lost in two close Tie-Breakers 6–7^{(4)}, 6–7^{(5)} to Elgin & Kudryavtsev.

Qureshi went to the Korat Challenger teaming up with Rohan Bopanna, where they reached the semi-finals. They defeated Levy and Okun 7–6^{(5)}, 3–6, 10–6 to reach the final, in which they beat Sanchai and Sonchat Ratiwatana 6–3, 6–7^{(5)} 10–5. Qureshi & Bopanna had to play their semi-final and final matches on the same day. This meant Qureshi claimed his second title in three weeks, Aisam also was a semi-finalist in Bangkok. Aisam went to the Johannesburg Challenger where he lost in the first round.

Aisam traveled to Busan, Korea to take part in the Challenger event. Aisam won his first round match against M. Semjan 6–3, 6–4, and in the second round Aisam won 7–6, 6–4 against T. Iwami to reach the quarter-finals. Qureshi travelled to Fergana where he lost in the second round in the Singles and lost in the Final in the Doubles.

He qualified for the main round of the 2009 Wimbledon doubles, paired with Prakash Amritraj. After upsetting the 16th seeds Huss and Hutchins, they next defeated Junaid and Marx in the second round. They faced fourth seeds Mahesh Bhupathi and Mark Knowles in the third Round and lost 4–6, 7–5, 6–7, 0–6. Qureshi lost in the second round in the qualifying rounds in Newport and lost in the first round in the main draw in the doubles. Qureshi then went to Båstad for the doubles event but lost in the first round. Qureshi then traveled to Indianapolis to take part in the singles qualifiers and the main draw in the doubles, where he was partnered with Sam Querrey. Qureshi won his first round qualifier against Joe Bates 6–3, 1–6, 6–3. Qureshi then faced L.Gregorc in the second round and won 6–3, 7–6 (7–4). Qureshi lost to Alex Bogomolov, Jr. in the final round 5–7, 4–6. In the doubles Qureshi and Querrey made it to the semi-finals before losing to E.Gulbis & D.Tursunov 6–1, 2–6 8–10.

Qureshi played in the US Open 2009 main draw, partnering with Jarkko Nieminen. They won the first round match, defeating A Golubev & D Istomin 4–6, 7–6^{(11)}, 6–4. They lost in the second round to second seeds Nestor & Zimonjic 7–6^{(5)}, 6–3.

On 3 November 2009, Qureshi with his partner James Cerretani defeated Roger Federer and Marco Chiudinelli in straight sets at the Basel Open Doubles. The final score was 6–4, 6–3. Qureshi said this was the greatest achievement of his career. Qureshi and Bopanna teamed up for both Challengers in Aachen & Helsinki and they won both Titles which marked a good end to the year for Qureshi. Qureshi ended the year at Number 59 in the Doubles Ranking.

=== 2010: Breakthrough season, US Open men's and mixed doubles runner up ===
Qureshi won his first ATP title ever at the 2010 SA Tennis Open in Johannesburg, South Africa, with his partner Rohan Bopanna. They defeated Karol Beck and Harel Levy, 2–6, 6–3, [10–5], in the final.

Qureshi and Bopanna then made their second ATP final of the year at the 2010 Grand Prix Hassan II in Casablanca, Morocco, but were defeated by Robert Lindstedt and Horia Tecău, 2–6, 6–3, [7–10].

In May, Qureshi and Bopanna were runners-up in the 2010 Open de Nice Côte d'Azur in Nice, France, falling 6–1, 3–6, 5–10 to Marcelo Melo and Bruno Soares in the final. Qureshi and Bopanna made the second round in the French Open but lost to Michaël Llodra and Julien Benneteau.

Qureshi and Bopanna reached their first-ever Grand Slam quarterfinals in the 2010 Wimbledon Championships. In the interim period between Wimbledon and the 2010 US Open, the South Asian duo made an appearance in the semifinals at the 2010 Legg Mason Tennis Classic, where they lost to eventual champions Mardy Fish and Mark Knowles after a dramatic straight-sets upset of second seeds Bob and Mike Bryan in the quarterfinal round. The duo had a disappointing second-round exit against Mariusz Fyrstenberg and Marcin Matkowski, the eighth seeds, at the 2010 Western & Southern Financial Group Masters shortly before their return to New York. In New Haven, Connecticut, at the last tournament before the US Open, Qureshi and Bopanna reached the final, where they again lost to Lindstedt and Tecău.

In men's doubles at the US Open, a 16th-seeded Qureshi and Bopanna again upset the second-seeded team, taking out Daniel Nestor and Nenad Zimonjić to advance to the quarterfinals, their second straight quarterfinal showing at a major tournament. They advanced to the semifinals with a straight-sets upset of Wesley Moodie and Dick Norman, the tenth-seeded pairing. In the semifinal, they ousted Eduardo Schwank and Horacio Zeballos, Jr., to advance to a meeting with Bob and Mike Bryan of the United States in the final. Qureshi and Bopanna gave the Bryan twins quite a run for the title but eventually lost to them in straight sets, 7–6, 7–6.

Qureshi also partnered with Květa Peschke in mixed doubles and beat the eighth-seeded team of Vania King and Horia Tecău in the first round, eventually advancing to the quarterfinals (with a win over Yaroslava Shvedova and Julian Knowle), the semifinals (beating Gisela Dulko and Pablo Cuevas), and the final (beating Anna-Lena Grönefeld and Mark Knowles). In the final, Peschke and Qureshi put up a great fight but eventually lost to Bob Bryan and Liezel Huber in a straight 6–4, 6–4.

Both US Open showings are Qureshi's best yet at any major tournament in any draw, and his partnership with Peschke marks his first outing in the mixed doubles competition of a hard-court major.

=== 2011: Year end No. 9 and first Masters 1000 title ===
Aisam started 2011 by taking part in India Open in doubles, where he reached the quarterfinals. He then went to the 2011 Medibank International Sydney. Partnered with Rohan Bopanna, he reached the semifinals, where they lost to eventual champions Lukáš Dlouhý and Paul Hanley 7 -5, 4–6, 10–8. Then Qureshi went to the Australian Open, where he and Bopanna reached the third round, before losing to Michaël Llodra and Nenad Zimonjić, 6–3, 6–7, 6–7.

Bopanna and Qureshi's run at the Monte Carlo Masters ended on Saturday when they were beaten in the semifinals by unseeded South Americans Juan Ignacio Chela and Bruno Soares, 2–6, 7–6^{(4)}, 7–10, in 95 minutes.

They advanced to the quarterfinals at Roland Garros, but lost to the Bryan Brothers, 6–7, 6–3, 6–7. They were top seeds at the Gerry Weber Open, which they won by defeating Milos Raonic and Robin Haase, 7–6, 3–6, 11–9.

He achieved the ranking of world no. 8 on 6 June 2011.

He reached the semifinals of the US Open doubles with Bopanna. Next, he won the Thailand Open doubles with Oliver Marach. This pair defeated Michael Kohlmann and Alexander Waske, 7–6^{(4)}, 7–6^{(5)}, in the final.

Aisam and Bopanna won the Stockholm Open, defeating Marcelo Melo and Bruno Soares of Brazil, 6–4, 6–3.

Aisam was also nominated for the Stephen Edberg Sportsmanship Award along with stars like Novak Djokovic, Rafael Nadal, and Roger Federer.

Bopanna and Qureshi compiled a consistent season, reaching the semifinals or better at seven tournaments in total, including at the US Open, where they were runners-up a year earlier. They also reached the quarterfinals at Roland Garros, losing to the Bryans.

The greatest achievement of the Indo-Pak Express in 2011 was winning the BNP Paribas Masters in Paris. They defeated the pair of Julien Benneteau and Nicolas Mahut in the final, 6–2, 6–4. They reached the finals by defeating the third seeds Max Mirnyi and Daniel Nestor, 6–3, 7–6, in the semifinals, and the second seeds Michaël Llodra and Nenad Zimonjić, 3–6, 6–4, 10–6, in the quarterfinals.

They became the seventh doubles team to qualify for the Barclays ATP World Tour Finals on 6 November. In their first round-robin match, they lost to Max Mirnyi and Daniel Nestor, 6–7, 6–4, 9–11. In their second round-robin match, they were defeated by Michaël Llodra and Nenad Zimonjić, 6–7, 3–6. In their third match, they were defeated by the Polish pair Mariusz Fyrstenberg and Marcin Matkowski, 2–6, 1–6. Since they lost all three of their round-robin matches, they did not qualify for the semifinal.

=== 2012: Multiple major semifinals and Paris masters final ===
In 2012, Aisam played with Curaçaoan Jean-Julien Rojer. They were seeded eighth at the 2012 Australian Open but only made it to the third round.

In May 2012, Aisam and Jean-Julien Rojer won the Estoril Open Tennis Tournament Doubles title. After winning the Estoril Open, Aisam and Rojer went to Madrid unseeded. They caused an upset by defeating the Bryan Brothers to make it to the quarter-finals but then lost to Bopanna and Bhupathi who were seeded seventh.

They went as tenth seeds to Roland Garros, breezed through to the quarter-finals, and then beat favorites third-seeded Llodra Zimonjic, but lost in the semi-finals to the Bryan brothers.

Aisam-ul-Haq defended his Gerry Weber Open men's doubles title with Dutch partner Jean-Julien Rojer, defeating Conrad Huey (Philippines) and Scott Lipsky of the US, 6–4, 6–3. In the semi-finals, the top seeds defeated Poland's Łukasz Kubot and Russia's Mikhail Youzhny 6–2, 6–4.

"Many people thought that my win was a fluke last year. It's all come together and I’m very excited because it has just reaffirmed our confidence. Switching from clay to grass was difficult and I was feeling the pressure but we did well", the Express Tribune quoted him as saying.

"This win proves that I’m good enough. Both Rojer and I have continued the momentum we started in Estoril, then to the French Open, and now in Halle. I’m sure I’ll be able to improve my rankings by the time the US Open starts", he said.

Qureshi and Rojer played the UNICEF Open and the second seeds lost in quarter-finals.

Qureshi and Rojer were seeded eighth at Wimbledon. They won the first round against Wild Cards and passed over Qualifiers Bobby Reynolds and Izak van der Merwe but after having an easy draw they lost in the third round to eventual winners Jonathan Marray and Frederik Nielsen, 6–7^{(5)}, 6–7^{(4)}, 7–6^{(4)}, 7–5, 5–7.

On 4 November, Qureshi and his partner Rojer were defeated by Indian duo Mahesh Bhupathi and Rohan Bopanna at the Paris Masters.

=== 2013: World No. 8 and Monte Carlo title ===
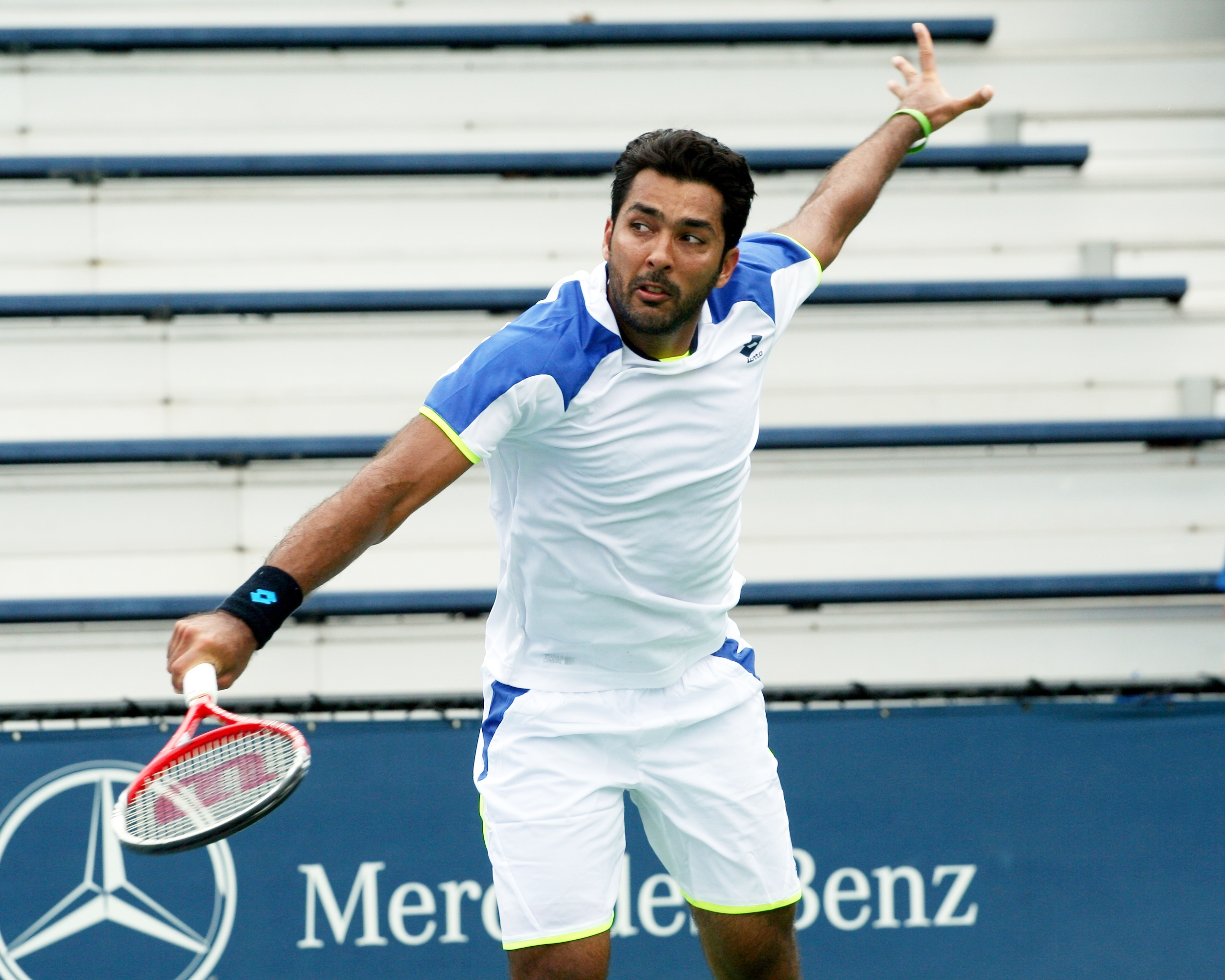

In 2013, Aisam ul Haq won the doubles titles with Netherlands partner Jean-Julien Rojer at the Sony Open in Miami, Florida, and the Stockholm Open in Stockholm, Sweden. Partnering with Rojer, Aisam also reached the Men's Doubles Quarterfinals at the U.S. Open.

In singles, Aisam ul Haq won two total matches while playing for the Pakistani Davis Cup team. He defeated Daniel King-Turner of New Zealand 6–2, 3–6, 3–0 (RET) and Dineshkanthan Thangarajah of Sri Lanka 6–2, 3–6, 6–3, 6–3.

=== 2014: Dubai Tennis Championship winner ===
In 2014, Qureshi won the doubles title with Rohan Bopanna at the Dubai Duty-Free Tennis Championships, beating Daniel Nestor and Nenad Zimonjić. In Indian Wells, they went down in the first round against Roger Federer and Stanislas Wawrinka before a standing-room-only crowd, although they had been seeded sixth.

=== 2015–2017: Mixed results ===
In July, Qureshi won the 2015 Hall of Fame Open in Newport, Rhode Island alongside British player Jonny Marray.

Qureshi entered the 2016 US Open (tennis) doubles event, partnering with Sweden's Robert Lindstedt where they lost in the quarterfinals to the top-seeded French duo of Pierre-Hugues Herbert and Nicolas Mahut. Qureshi also played mixed doubles with China's Xu Yifan but they lost to Kazakhstan's Yaroslava Shvedova & Brazil's Bruno Soares in the first round.

In 2017 he won six titles: In January the ATP 250 tournament in Auckland; on 30 April, the ATP 500 event in Barcelona, Spain alongside Romanian player Florin Mergea; on 11 June, the ATP Challenger in Surbiton, Great Britain alongside partner Marcus Daniell; on 30 June, the ATP 250 event in Antalya, Turkey alongside Lindstedt; on 17 July, the ATP 250 Hall of Fame in Newport, RI, alongside partner Rajeev Ram; on 1 October, the ATP 250 event in Chengdu, China alongside partner Jonathan Erlich.

=== 2018–2020: Final two ATP titles ===
In 2018, Qureshi did not win any major tournaments, but reached the quarterfinals of the 2018 Australian Open with Marcin Matkowski losing to the Bryan brothers and the final at the 2018 Barcelona Open Banco Sabadell with Jean-Julien Rojer.

In June 2019, Qureshi won two ATP Challenger Tours in Ilkey and Nottingham, Great Britain alongside partner Santiago Gonzalez. They also won the 2019 U.S. Men's Clay Court Championships.

On 16 February 2020, Qureshi won the ATP 250 event 2020 New York Open alongside partner Dominic Inglot.

=== 2021: Two ATP finals ===
In 2021 he reached two more ATP 250 finals at the Emilia-Romagna Open with Austria's Oliver Marach losing in the final, 6–3, 6–3 to Simone Bolelli and Máximo González, and at Stockholm Open with Rojer losing to Santiago González and Andrés Molteni 6–2, 6–2 in the final.

=== 2022: Last ATP tour Finals ===
In 2022, he reached the ATP final at the Melbourne Summer Set 1 partnering with a new partner Aleksandr Nedovyesov but lost to the pair of Wesley Koolhof and Neal Skupski 6–4, 6–4.

At the 2022 Australian Open he again partnered with Nedoyesov where they defeated seventh-seeded pair of Nicolas Mahut and Fabrice Martin. before losing to the pair of Marcos Giron and Kwon Soon-woo in the second round.

At the Delray Beach Open he reached his second ATP final for the year with Nedovyesov, this time losing to the pair of Marcelo Arévalo and Jean-Julien Rojer 2–6, 7–6^{(7–5)}, [4–10].

=== 2023: Last Grand Slam appearance ===
In 2023, he partnered with Serbian player Nikola Ćaćić at the Australian Open where the pair reached the third round where they lost the match 4–6, 2–6 to the World No. 1 pair of Wesley Koolhof and Neal Skupski. After several early tournament exits, in May 2023, after an impressive 722 consecutive weeks in the Top 100 of ATP doubles rankings, he finally dropped out of that elite group. This marked the first time he had fallen below the Top 100 since July 2009. As a result of this, he failed to qualify for the 2023 French Open resulting in the end of his streak of playing in fifty grand slams that stretch back to 2009 Wimbledon.

As a consequence of these, he became absent from the main ATP Tour and was forced to play in ATP Challenger Tour in march he reached the final of Play In Challenger alongside Dustin Brown, but lost to Max Purcell and Jason Taylor 6–7^{(3–7)}, 4–6. In July, he won a title in Iași partnering Colombian player Nicolás Barrientos where they defeated the Romanian pair of Gabi Adrian Boitan and Bogdan Pavel 6–3, 6–3 in the final. In September, he playing with Dutch player Sander Arends lost in the final of the Istanbul Challenger 6–7^{(3–7)}, 3–6 to the pair of Luke Johnson and Skander Mansouri.

=== 2024–2025: Last Davis Cup and retirement ===
The 2024 season of Qureshi started quite poorly. He paired up with the Indonesian player, Christopher Rungkat for the Nonthaburi Challenger II but lost in the first round to the number #1 seeded pair of Luke Johnson and Skander Mansouri in straight sets 1–6, 4–6. The following week, the pair played at Nonthaburi Challenger III, this time they lost in the second round. Meanwhile, his ATP doubles ranking continued to plummet. As he was only ranked world no. 127 on the week starting 8 January he failed to qualify for the 2024 Australian Open (for the first time since 2009 edition). Not playing in the Melbourne Park prevented him from defending his 180 points earned from his third round advancement from the previous year. As a result, he fell out of the top 150 of the doubles rankings, dropping to #154 on the rankings ending 28 January.

In February, he played a Davis Cup singles match against India during the 2024 Davis Cup World Group I play-offs where played the opening tie against Ramkumar Ramanathan but lost after winning the first set in a tiebreaker with the final scoreline being 7–6^{(7–3)}, 6–7(4–7), 0–6. During this time, he also made a return to the ATP main tour after a nearly six-month hiatus. His comeback occurred at the Dubai Tennis Championships. During this tournament, he partnered with Skander Mansouri, the same player he had faced and lost to in Nonthaburi in January. The Tunisian-Pakistani duo received a wild card entry into the main draw. Their first-round opponents were none other than the world No. 1 pair, Matthew Ebden and Qureshi’s former partner, Rohan Bopanna. They narrowly lost the match to the Indo-Aussie pair, with a scoreline of 6–7^{(4–7)}, 6–7^{(5–7)}. During this month, Qureshi announced that 2024 season will be his last one.

In March, Qureshi participated at the Murcia Open alongside Spaniard David Vega Hernández. The pair lost in the first round to the number one seeded pair of Théo Arribagé and Victor Vlad Cornea in straight sets, 6–1, 6–4. The following week, the pair took part in the 2024 Girona Challenger, where they won their first round match against Swedish/American pair of André Göransson and Reese Stalder, 7–5, 6–4. In the second round they lost in a very close match to the Dutch 3rd seeded pair of Sander Arends and Matwé Middelkoop by the score of 4–6, 6–3, [8-10].

In April, Qureshi alongside Hernández took part in 2024 Sánchez-Casal Cup, a Challenger 75 event. They were the 1st seeded pair at the event. They won their first round and quarterfinal matches in straight sets over the pairs of Ivan Gakhov / Ryan Nijboer and Karol Drzewiecki / Szymon Walkow, respectively. They eventually lost in the semifinals to the eventual champion Spanish pair of Daniel Rincón and Oriol Roca Batalla, 7–6^{(7–4)}, 3–6, [3–10]. Despite this performance his ranking continued its downfall. He dropped to 183rd rank on the week ending on 8 April after losing in the first round of the 2024 Open Comunidad de Madrid. This was his lowest rank since the week ending 30 July in 2007. The following week, the Pak-Spanish pair played at the 2024 Open Comunidad de Madrid, where they lost in the first round in straight sets to the unseeded pair of Marco Bortolotti and Sergio Martos Gornés, 2–6, 6–7^{(3–7)}. Qureshi did not play a professional match for the next two months. As a consequence of which, on the week ending 24 June, Aisam dropped out of the ATP doubles ranking Top 200, after 860 weeks.

In July, Qureshi played at the 2024 Iași Open, where he was the defending champion alongside Nicolás Barrientos, but only Qureshi chose to defend his title, partnering Dmitry Popko. They lost in the first round to Alexandru Jecan and Szymon Walków in straight sets, 2–6, 6–7^{(3–7)}. Over the following two weeks, he again partnered Hernández to play at the 2024 Dutch Open and 2024 Internazionali di Tennis Città di Verona. They end up losing their opening round matches in both the tournament. After these tournaments, he took a hiatus of nearly two months. His doubles ranking took a hit as a result, he not only dropped out of Top 300, but also out of Top 400. This was his first week out of the doubles Top 400 after 914 weeks or since 1 October 2006.

In September, Qureshi returned to play a doubles match at 2024 Davis Cup World Group II. He played alongside Aqeel Khan. However, the pair lost the crucial and decisive doubles match against the pair of Darian King and Haydn Lewis in three sets, 6–7^{(3–7)}, 7–6^{(7–1)}, 2–6. In the end, Pakistan lost their tie against Barbados, 1–3.

== Personal life ==
He married Faha Makhdum, a British woman of Pakistani origin, on 17 December 2011. In July 2012, it was rumored that Aisam and Faha had parted ways. Both families denied the news but later the couple announced their break-up. Makhdum said that they had not much time together during their marriage because of the busy schedule of tennis activities her husband had, which made her neglected as a wife for around thirty-eight weeks a year. In 2020, he married Sana Fayyaz, daughter of Mohammad Fayyaz, a businessman from Lahore. In 2022, the couple welcomed their first son.

== Career statistics ==
=== Grand Slam tournament performance timelines ===
Key
W	F	SF	QF	#R	RR	Q#	DNQ	A	NH

(W) winner; (F) finalist; (SF) semifinalist; (QF) quarterfinalist; (#R) rounds 4, 3, 2, 1; (RR) round-robin stage; (Q#) qualification round; (DNQ) did not qualify; (A) absent; (NH) not held; (SR) strike rate (events won / competed); (W–L) win–loss record.
To avoid confusion and double counting, these charts are updated at the conclusion of a tournament or when the player's participation has ended.

==== Doubles ====
Tournament	2002	2003	2004	2005	2006	2007	2008	2009	2010	2011	2012	2013	2014	2015	2016	2017	2018	2019	2020	2021	2022	2023	2024	SR	W–L	Win %
Australian Open	Absent								1R	3R	3R	3R	3R	3R	1R	2R	QF	1R	1R	2R	2R	3R	A	0 / 14	17–14	55%
French Open	A	1R	Absent				1R	A	2R	QF	SF	3R	2R	1R	3R	1R	1R	1R	1R	2R	1R	A	A	0 / 15	14–15	48%
Wimbledon	3R	1R	Absent				2R	3R	QF	1R	3R	3R	2R	2R	2R	3R	2R	3R	NH	3R	2R	A	A	0 / 16	23–16	59%
US Open	2R	Absent					1R	2R	F	SF	SF	QF	1R	2R	QF	1R	1R	1R	1R	3R	2R	A	A	0 / 16	24–16	60%
Win–loss	3–2	0–2	0–0	0–0	0–0	0–0	1–3	3–2	9–4	9–4	11–4	9–4	4–4	4–4	6–4	3–4	3–4	2–4	0–3	6–4	3-4	2–1	0–0	0 / 61	78–61	56%

==== Mixed doubles ====
Tournament	2010	2011	2012	2013	2014	2015	2016	2017	2018	2019	2020	2021	2022	2023	2024	SR	W–L	Win %
Australian Open	A	1R	QF	1R	QF	1R	2R	1R	1R	A	A	A	QF	A	A	0 / 9	7–9	44%
French Open	2R	2R	1R	SF	A	QF	1R	1R	1R	SF	NH	A	A	A	A	0 / 9	10–9	53%
Wimbledon	1R	2R	2R	3R	SF	1R	SF	2R	2R	3R	NH	2R	A	A	A	0 / 11	11–11	50%
US Open	F	A	1R	1R	2R	A	1R	2R	1R	A	NH	A	A	A	A	0 / 7	6–7	46%
Win–loss	5–3	1–3	2–4	4–4	6–3	2–3	4–4	1–4	1–4	5–2	0–0	0–1	2–1	0–0	0–0	0 / 36	34–36	49%

=== Grand Slam tournament finals ===
==== Doubles: 1 (1 runner-up) ====
Result	Year	Championship	Surface	Partner	Opponents	Score
Loss	2010	US Open	Hard	(India) Rohan Bopanna	(United States) Bob Bryan (United States) Mike Bryan	6–7^{(5–7)}, 6–7^{(4–7)}

==== Mixed doubles: 1 (1 runner-up) ====
Result	Year	Championship	Surface	Partner	Opponents	Score
Loss	2010	US Open	Hard	(Czech Republic) Květa Peschke	(United States) Liezel Huber (United States) Bob Bryan	4–6, 4–6

Awards
Preceded by Andre Agassi	ATP Arthur Ashe Humanitarian of the Year; 2002 with Amir Hadad	Succeeded by Gustavo Kuerten
Preceded by MaliVai Washington	ATP Arthur Ashe Humanitarian of the Year; 2010 with Rohan Bopanna	Succeeded by Rafael Nadal
