= 2008 Indianapolis Tennis Championships =

- Date: July 14–20
- Edition: 21st
- Category: International Series
- Draw: 32S / 16D
- Prize money: $500,000
- Surface: Hard / outdoor
- Location: Indianapolis, Indiana, United States
- Venue: Indianapolis Tennis Center

Champions

Singles
- (France) Gilles Simon

Doubles
- (Australia) Ashley Fisher / (United States) Tripp Phillips
- Indianapolis Tennis Championships

The 2008 Indianapolis Tennis Championships was a men's tennis tournament played on outdoor hard courts. It was the 21st edition of the Indianapolis Tennis Championships, and was part of the International Series of the 2008 ATP Tour. It took place at the Indianapolis Tennis Center in Indianapolis, Indiana, United States, from July 14 through July 20, 2008.

The singles draw featured ATP No. 8, Delray Beach and Houston runner-up, 2006 Indianapolis champion James Blake, Rotterdam semifinalist and Casablanca titlist Gilles Simon, and Sydney winner and Indianapolis defending champion Dmitry Tursunov. Other top seeds were Las Vegas champion Sam Querrey, Indian Wells Masters quarterfinalist Tommy Haas, Fabrice Santoro, Robby Ginepri and Thomaz Bellucci.

== Finals ==
=== Singles ===
(France) Gilles Simon defeated (Russia) Dmitry Tursunov, 6–4, 6–4

- It was Gilles Simon's 2nd title of the year, and his 4th overall.

=== Doubles ===
(Australia) Ashley Fisher / (United States) Tripp Phillips defeated (United States) Scott Lipsky / (United States) David Martin, 3–6, 6–3, [10–5]
