= 1993 Philips Open =

- Date: 12–18 April
- Edition: 22nd
- Category: ATP World Series
- Draw: 32S / 16D
- Prize money: $275,000
- Surface: Clay / outdoor
- Location: Nice, France
- Venue: Nice Lawn Tennis Club

Champions

Singles
- (Germany) Marc-Kevin Goellner

Doubles
- (Australia) David Macpherson / (Australia) Scott Melville
← 1992 ·	Open de Nice Côte d'Azur	· 1994 →

The 1993 Philips Open was a men's tennis tournament played on outdoor clay courts at the Nice Lawn Tennis Club in Nice, France, and was part of the ATP World Series of the 1993 ATP Tour. It was the 22nd edition of the tournament and took place from 12 April through 18 April 1993. Qualifier Marc-Kevin Goellner won the singles title.

== Finals ==
=== Singles ===
(Germany) Marc-Kevin Goellner defeated (United States) Ivan Lendl 1–6, 6–4, 6–2

- It was Goellner's first singles title of his career.

=== Doubles ===
(Australia) David Macpherson / (Australia) Laurie Warder defeated (United States) Shelby Cannon / (United States) Scott Melville 3–4 ret
