= 1995 Philips Open =

- Date: 17–24 April
- Edition: 23rd
- Category: ATP World Series
- Draw: 32S / 16D
- Prize money: $303,000
- Surface: Clay / outdoor
- Location: Nice, France
- Venue: Nice Lawn Tennis Club

Champions

Singles
- (Switzerland) Marc Rosset

Doubles
- (Czechoslovakia) Cyril Suk / (Czechoslovakia) Daniel Vacek
- Open de Nice Côte d'Azur

The 1995 Philips Open was a men's tennis tournament played on outdoor clay courts at the Nice Lawn Tennis Club in Nice, France, and was part of the ATP World Series of the 1995 ATP Tour. It was the 23rd edition of the tournament and took place from 17 April until 24 April 1995. Fifth-seeded Marc Rosset won the singles title.

== Finals ==
=== Singles ===
(Switzerland) Marc Rosset defeated (Russia) Yevgeny Kafelnikov 6–4, 6–0

- It was Rosset's 1st singles title of the year and the 10th of his career.

=== Doubles ===
(Czechoslovakia) Cyril Suk / (Czechoslovakia) Daniel Vacek defeated (United States) Luke Jensen / (United States) David Wheaton 3–6, 7–6, 7–6
