= 2008 Medibank International – Men's singles =

Men's singles
- 2008 Medibank International

Final
- Champion: (Russia) Dmitry Tursunov
- Runner-up: (Australia) Chris Guccione
- Score: 7–6^{(7–3)}, 7–6^{(7–4)}

Details
- Draw: 32 (4Q / 3WC)
- Seeds: 8

Events
Singles	men	women
Doubles	men	women
← 2007 ·	Sydney International	· 2009 →

James Blake was the defending champion, but lost in the first round to Fabrice Santoro.

Dmitry Tursunov won in the final 7–6^{(7–3)}, 7–6^{(7–4)}, against Chris Guccione.

== Seeds ==
1. (France) Richard Gasquet (second round)
2. (Spain) Tommy Robredo (first round)
3. (United States) James Blake (first round)
4. (Czech Republic) Tomáš Berdych (quarterfinals)
5. (Spain) Carlos Moyá (second round)
6. (Australia) Lleyton Hewitt (second round)
7. (France) Paul-Henri Mathieu (first round, retired due to a leg injury)
8. (Spain) Fernando Verdasco (second round)

== Draw ==
=== Key ===
- Q = Qualifier
- WC = Wild card
- LL = Lucky loser
- Alt = Alternate
- SE = Special exempt
- PR = Protected ranking
- ITF = ITF entry
- JE = Junior exempt
- w/o = Walkover
- r = Retired
- d = Defaulted
- SR = Special ranking

=== Finals ===
Semifinals
(Russia) Dmitry Tursunov	6	7
(France) Fabrice Santoro	3	6^{4}
WC	(Australia) Chris Guccione	7	3	6
(Czech Republic) Radek Štěpánek	6^{5}	6	4

Final
(Russia) Dmitry Tursunov	7	7
WC	(Australia) Chris Guccione	6^{3}	6^{4}

=== Top half ===
First round
1	(France) R Gasquet	6	7
(Russia) I Andreev	3	6^{6}
(Russia) D Tursunov	6	6
(Switzerland) S Wawrinka	3	3
(France) S Grosjean	6	4	6
WC	(Australia) P Luczak	4	6	0
(Spain) F López	3	6	2
8	(Spain) F Verdasco	6	4	6
3	(United States) J Blake	6^{4}	2
(France) F Santoro	7	6
Q	(Belgium) S Darcis	6	7
SE	(Australia) J Sirianni	1	6^{4}
Q	(Australia) A Jones	2	5
Q	(Czech Republic) I Minář	6	7
LL	(Russia) E Korolev	6
7	(France) P-H Mathieu	1	r

Second round
1	(France) R Gasquet	6	3	4
(Russia) D Tursunov	3	6	6
(France) S Grosjean	6	6
8	(Spain) F Verdasco	3	4
(France) F Santoro	6	6
Q	(Belgium) S Darcis	1	3
Q	(Czech Republic) I Minář	2	3
LL	(Russia) E Korolev	6	6

Quarterfinals
(Russia) D Tursunov	6	6
(France) S Grosjean	4	2
(France) F Santoro	6	6
LL	(Russia) E Korolev	3	3

Semifinals
(Russia) D Tursunov	6	7
(France) F Santoro	3	6^{4}

=== Bottom half ===
First round
6	(Australia) L Hewitt	6	6
(France) N Mahut	3	4
WC	(Australia) C Guccione	7^{8}	6
Q	(Spain) A Martín	6^{6}	4
(France) G Simon	7	6
(United States) M Fish	6^{6}	1
(Italy) F Volandri	1	3
4	(Czech Republic) T Berdych	6	6
5	(Spain) C Moyá	1	6	6
(Austria) S Koubek	6	4	2
(Argentina) A Calleri	6	6
WC	(Australia) G Jones	3	2
(Italy) A Seppi	3	6	6
(France) J-W Tsonga	6	3	2
(Czech Republic) R Štěpánek	6	6
2	(Spain) T Robredo	4	2

Second round
6	(Australia) L Hewitt	6^{4}	6^{2}
WC	(Australia) C Guccione	7	7
(France) G Simon	6^{3}	2
4	(Czech Republic) T Berdych	7	6
5	(Spain) C Moyá	3	4
(Argentina) A Calleri	6	6
(Italy) A Seppi	5	6	4
(Czech Republic) R Štěpánek	7	2	6

Quarterfinals
WC	(Australia) C Guccione	4	7	6
4	(Czech Republic) T Berdych	6	6^{6}	4
(Argentina) A Calleri	2	4
(Czech Republic) R Štěpánek	6	6

Semifinals
WC	(Australia) C Guccione	7	3	6
(Czech Republic) R Štěpánek	6^{5}	6	4
