= 2008 in tennis =

This page covers all the important events in the sport of tennis in 2008. Primarily, it provides the results of notable tournaments throughout the year on both the ATP and WTA Tours, the Davis Cup, the Fed Cup, and the Olympics.

== News ==
=== January ===
See: 2008 ATP Tour, 2008 WTA Tour

1 – World No. 3 Jelena Janković was forced to withdraw from her Hopman Cup tie against Tatiana Golovin, putting a question mark over whether she will be fit enough to play the Australian Open.

2 – Lindsay Davenport survived a second set scare to edge past Anabel Medina Garrigues, while Xavier Malisse and Mikhail Youzhny both won in the men's event in Chennai.

3 – Andy Murray, Nikolay Davydenko, Ivan Ljubičić and Stanislas Wawrinka all advanced into the Qatar Open semi-finals, while Rafael Nadal continued his run in Chennai. Over on the WTA, hometown wildcard Marina Erakovic stunned Vera Zvonareva in Auckland, while defending champion Dinara Safina wasted five match points to lose to Shahar Pe'er in Gold Coast.

4 – former world number one Martina Hingis was banned for two years when the verdict over her drugs case was reached. Hingis had dropped the bombshell in October that she had tested positive for cocaine, and retired immediately after.

5 – Li Na defeated Victoria Azarenka to win the Gold Coast, while three-time Grand Slam champion Lindsay Davenport won her third tournament since her comeback in Auckland. On the ATP, Michaël Llodra beat Jarkko Nieminen to win Adelaide, Andy Murray won the Qatar Open and Rafael Nadal beat Carlos Moyà to reach the Chennai final. United States team Serena Williams and Mardy Fish defeated Serbia to win the 2008 Hopman Cup. Finally, Venus Williams beat Maria Sharapova 6–4, 6–3 to win the JB Group Classic, an exhibition tournament, in Hong Kong.

6 – World No. 2 Rafael Nadal was thrashed 6–0, 6–1 by Mikhail Youzhny in the Chennai Open final. Amélie Mauresmo announced her withdrawal from the following week's Medibank International tournament. Three time French Open champion Gustavo Kuerten announced that he expected 2008 to be his final year of play.

7 – Roger Federer withdrew from exhibition event the AAMI Kooyong Classic due to illness, while at the joint tournament in Sydney, Anna Chakvetadze, Elena Dementieva and defending men's champion James Blake all suffered shock defeats. Jelena Dokić won her first WTA main draw match in two years by defeating Martina Müller at Hobart.

8 – The ITF, ATP, WTA and organisers of all four slams announced that they would come together and review their anti-corruption policies, in light of recent events. Former British police officers, Jeffrey Rees and Ben Gunn, who have helped stamp out corruption in cricket and horse racing, have been hired.

9 – Lleyton Hewitt suffered another blow in his preparations for the 2008 Australian Open, making a second early exit in as many weeks; this time in Sydney. Nicole Vaidišová earned a shock victory over third seeded Jelena Janković on the women's side.

10 – The women's final of the Medibank International took shape – Justine Henin defeated Ana Ivanovic in three sets, whilst Svetlana Kuznetsova completed a tight two set victory over Nicole Vaidišová.

11 – The singles draws for the Australian Open were announced. WTA chief Larry Scott released a statement highlighting the threat of organised crime, in particular, the Russian mafia, in the corruption of the sport. Justine Henin defeated Svetlana Kuznetsova 4–6, 6–2, 6–4 to win the women's Medibank International tournament. Eleni Daniilidou won in Hobart.

12 – Dmitry Tursunov won the Medibank International 7–6(3), 7–6(4); ending Chris Guccione's dream run. Philipp Kohlschreiber triumphed in Auckland, defeating Juan Carlos Ferrero; and Andy Roddick won the Kooyong Classic exhibition, taking down Marcos Baghdatis.

13 – World No. 1 Roger Federer announced that he would play an exhibition match against Pete Sampras, to follow up the three in Asia during November 2007; this time at Madison Square Gardens, New York City. Outside of tournament play, it was reported that the Australian Open could be at risk due to Chinese ambitions of their own Grand Slam, something that Roger Federer and Serena Williams have publicly spoken out against.

14 – The 2008 Australian Open begins, with the singles matches. Jelena Janković, the women's no. 3 seed, survived a first round scare against Tamira Paszek, saving five match points. Jo-Wilfried Tsonga sent men's no. 9 seed Andy Murray packing with a 7–5, 6–4, 0–6, 7–6 win.

15 – After the ATP match-fixing scandal, the WTA Tour announced that several female tennis players had been approached about throwing tennis matches. Sofia Arvidsson caused the first big upset on the women's side, knocking out tenth seed Marion Bartoli. Gustavo Kuerten announces that he will officially retire after the French Open.

16 – Play at the Australian Open was disrupted for the second year in a row by crowd riots, between Cypriot and Greek supporters in the match between Fernando González and Konstantinos Economidis, forcing the police to intervene. Maria Sharapova beat former winner Lindsay Davenport in the women's second round. In men's second round action, Tommy Robredo lost easily to Mardy Fish.

18 – Taiwanese player Hsieh Su-wei reached the fourth round of a Grand Slam for the first time in her career, having never made it past the first round before. Home favourite Casey Dellacqua stunned 2006 champion Amélie Mauresmo 3–6, 6–4, 6–4. Andy Roddick lost in a five-set thriller, going down to Philipp Kohlschreiber 6–4, 3–6, 7–6, 6–7, 8–6.

19 – No. 2 seed Svetlana Kuznetsova was sent crashing out by Agnieszka Radwańska, while No. 6 seed Anna Chakvetadze lost to Maria Kirilenko in two shocking upsets in the women's draw. Roger Federer and Lleyton Hewitt wowed the Australian crowds, both pulling out two thrilling five set wins. Federer beat Janko Tipsarević 6–7, 7–6, 5–7, 6–1, 10–8, while Hewitt outlasted Marcos Baghdatis 4–6, 7–5, 7–5, 6–7, 6–3. Fernando González lost to Marin Čilić in four sets.

20 – Jo-Wilfried Tsonga reached his maiden Grand Slam quarterfinal with a win over eighth seed Richard Gasquet. Mikhail Youzhny upset fourth-seeded compatriot Nikolay Davydenko in an all-Russian clash. In the women's draw, the favourites all moved through with ease.

21 – The quarterfinal line-ups were set in both the men and women's draws, with Roger Federer, Novak Djokovic, Ana Ivanovic and Venus Williams being just a few of the eight players who moved through with wins.

22 – Maria Sharapova snapped world No. 1 Justine Henin's 32-match winning streak with a crushing 6–4, 6–0 defeat, while Jelena Janković stunned defending champion Serena Williams with a 6–3, 6–4 victory in the women's quarterfinals. Jo-Wilfried Tsonga continued his incredible run in the men's quarterfinals, beating Mikhail Youzhny to set up a meeting with No. 2 Rafael Nadal.

23 – Roger Federer and Novak Djokovic set up a men's semifinal clash, while Ana Ivanovic beat Venus Williams for the first time, to go on to meet Daniela Hantuchová, who beat Agnieszka Radwańska in straight sets.

24 – The women's final was set as Maria Sharapova beat Jelena Janković 6–3, 6–1; she will now meet Ana Ivanovic who came from losing the first eight games of the match to beat Daniela Hantuchová 0–6, 6–3, 6–4. In the men's play, Jo-Wilfried Tsonga reached his first Grand Slam final with a titanic upset over No. 2 seed Rafael Nadal 6–2, 6–3, 6–2.

25 – Sisters Alona and Kateryna Bondarenko won the women's doubles tournament by defeating Victoria Azarenka and Shahar Pe'er 2–6, 6–1, 6–4 in the final. Novak Djokovic beat world number one Roger Federer in straight sets to advance to his second Grand Slam final, where he will face Jo-Wilfried Tsonga.

26 – Maria Sharapova defeats Ana Ivanovic to win the 2008 Australian Open women's singles title.

27 – Novak Djokovic defeats Jo-Wilfried Tsonga to win the 2008 Australian Open men's singles title.

=== June ===
7 – 2007 finalist Ana Ivanovic beats Dinara Safina to win the French Open and with this win Ivanovic would become the new World No. 1

8 – Three time defending champion Rafael Nadal defeated Three time runner-up Roger Federer 6–1, 6–3, 6–0 in the French Open Final to finish their rivalry. This is the first time since 1999 that Federer has lost a set 6–0.

=== July ===
Rafael Nadal dethrones five time defending champion Roger Federer 6–4, 6–4, 6–7(5), 6–7(8), 9–7 in what many consider the greatest match of the decade. Nadal won his first Wimbledon title in near darkness after over four hours of play and over 2 hours of rain delay.

=== September ===
8 - US Open: Roger Federer wins the Men's Singles and Serena Williams wins the Women's Singles title.

14 - Fed Cup: Russia wins 4-0 over Spain

=== November ===
23 - Spain wins Davis Cup 3-1 over Argentina

== ITF ==
=== Grand Slam events ===
- 2008 Australian Open (January 14 – January 27)
  - Men's singles: (Serbia) Novak Djokovic def. (France) Jo-Wilfried Tsonga, 4–6, 6–4, 6–3, 7–6(2)
  - Women's singles: (Russia) Maria Sharapova def. (Serbia) Ana Ivanovic, 7–5, 6–3
  - Men's doubles: (Israel) Jonathan Erlich & (Israel) Andy Ram def. (France) Arnaud Clément & (France) Michaël Llodra, 7–5, 7–6(4)
  - Women's doubles: (Ukraine) Alona Bondarenko & (Ukraine) Kateryna Bondarenko def. (Belarus) Victoria Azarenka & (Israel) Shahar Pe'er, 2–6, 6–1, 6–4
  - Mixed doubles: (China) Sun Tiantian & (Serbia) Nenad Zimonjić def. (India) Sania Mirza & (India) Mahesh Bhupathi, 7–6(4), 6–4
- 2008 French Open (May 26 – June 8)
  - Men's singles: (Spain) Rafael Nadal def. (Switzerland) Roger Federer, 6–1, 6–3, 6–0
  - Women's singles: (Serbia) Ana Ivanovic def. (Russia) Dinara Safina, 6–4, 6–3
  - Men's doubles: (Uruguay) Pablo Cuevas & (Peru) Luis Horna def. (Canada) Daniel Nestor & (Serbia) Nenad Zimonjić, 6–2, 6–3
  - Women's doubles: (Spain) Anabel Medina Garrigues & (Spain) Virginia Ruano Pascual def. (Australia) Casey Dellacqua & (Italy) Francesca Schiavone, 2–6, 7–5, 6–4
  - Mixed doubles: (Belarus) Victoria Azarenka & (United States) Bob Bryan def. (Slovenia) Katarina Srebotnik & (Serbia) Nenad Zimonjić, 6–2, 7–6(4)
- 2008 Wimbledon Championships (June 24 – July 6)
  - Men's singles: (Spain) Rafael Nadal def. (Switzerland) Roger Federer, 6–4, 6–4, 6–7(5), 6–7(8), 9–7
  - Women's singles: (United States) Venus Williams def. (United States) Serena Williams, 7–5, 6–4
  - Men's doubles: (Canada) Daniel Nestor & (Serbia) Nenad Zimonjić def. (Sweden) Jonas Björkman & (Zimbabwe) Kevin Ullyett, 7–6(12), 6–7(3), 6–3, 6–3
  - Women's doubles: (United States) Serena Williams & (United States) Venus Williams def. (United States) Lisa Raymond & (Australia) Samantha Stosur, 6–2, 6–2
  - Mixed doubles: (United States) Bob Bryan & (Australia) Samantha Stosur def. (United States) Mike Bryan & (Slovenia) Katarina Srebotnik, 7–5, 6–4
- 2008 US Open (August 25 – September 7)
  - Men's singles: (Switzerland) Roger Federer def. (United Kingdom) Andy Murray, 6–2, 7–5, 6–2
  - Women's singles: (United States) Serena Williams def. (Serbia) Jelena Janković, 6–4, 7–5
  - Men's doubles: (United States) Bob Bryan & (United States) Mike Bryan def. (Czech Republic) Lukáš Dlouhý & (India) Leander Paes, 7–6(5), 7–6(10)
  - Women's doubles: (Zimbabwe) Cara Black & (United States) Liezel Huber def. (United States) Lisa Raymond & (Australia) Samantha Stosur, 6–3, 7–6(6)
  - Mixed doubles: (Zimbabwe) Cara Black & (India) Leander Paes def. (United States) Liezel Huber & (United Kingdom) Jamie Murray, 7–6(6), 6–4

=== 2008 Davis Cup ===
World Group Draw

- S-Seeded
- U-Unseeded
- * Choice of ground

Round One
S	Russia *	3
U	Serbia	2
S	Belgium	2
U	Czech Republic *	3
S	Argentina *	4
U	Great Britain	1
S	Sweden	3
U	Israel *	2
U	South Korea	2
S	Germany *	3
U	Peru *	0
S	Spain	5
U	Romania *	0
S	France	5
U	Austria *	1
S	United States	4

Quarterfinals
S	Russia *	3
U	Czech Republic	2
S	Argentina *	4
S	Sweden	1
S	Germany *	1
S	Spain	4
S	France	1
S	United States *	4

Semifinals
S	Russia	2
S	Argentina *	3
S	Spain *	4
S	United States	1

Final
S	Argentina *	1
S	Spain	3

==== Final ====
Argentina
1
Estadio Polideportivo, Mar del Plata, Argentina
November 21–23, 2008
hard (indoors)

Spain
3

			1	2	3	4	5
1	(Argentina) (Spain)	David Nalbandián; David Ferrer	6; 3	6; 2	6; 3
2	(Argentina) (Spain)	Juan Martín del Potro; Feliciano López	6; 4	6^{2} 7^{7}	6^{5} 7^{7}	3; 6
3	(Argentina) (Spain)	Agustín Calleri / David Nalbandián; Feliciano López / Fernando Verdasco	7; 5	5; 7	6^{5} 7^{7}	3; 6
4	(Argentina) (Spain)	José Acasuso; Fernando Verdasco	3; 6	7^{7} 6^{4}	6; 4	3; 6	1; 6
5	(Argentina) (Spain)	David Nalbandián; Feliciano López						not played

World Group Playoffs

Date: 19–21 September

Venue (surface)	Home team	Score	Visiting team
Antofagasta, Chile (clay)	Chile	3–2	Australia
Wimbledon, London, Great Britain (grass)	Great Britain	2–3	Austria
Lausanne, Switzerland (indoor hard)	Switzerland	4–1	Belgium
Zadar, Croatia (indoor hard)	Croatia	4–1	Brazil
Ramat HaSharon, Israel (hard)	Israel	4–1	Peru
Apeldoorn, Netherlands (indoor clay)	Netherlands	3–2	South Korea
Bucharest, Romania (clay)	Romania	4–1	India
Bratislava, Slovakia (indoor hard)	Slovakia	1–4	Serbia

=== 2008 Fed Cup ===
World Group Draw

- S-Seeded
- U-Unseeded
- * Choice of ground

Quarterfinals
S	Russia	4
U	Israel *	1
S	United States *	4
U	Germany	1
U	China *	3
S	France	2
U	Spain	3
S	Italy *	2

Semifinals
S	Russia *	3
S	United States	2
U	China *	1
U	Spain	4

Final
S	Russia	4
U	Spain *	0

==== Final ====
Spain
0
Club de Campo Villa de Madrid, Madrid, Spain
13–14 September 2008
Clay – Outdoors

Russia
4

			1	2	3
1	(Spain) (Russia)	Anabel Medina Garrigues; Vera Zvonareva	3; 6	4; 6
2	(Spain) (Russia)	Carla Suárez Navarro; Svetlana Kuznetsova	3; 6	1; 6
3	(Spain) (Russia)	Anabel Medina Garrigues; Svetlana Kuznetsova	7; 5	3; 6	4; 6
4	(Spain) (Russia)	Carla Suárez Navarro; Vera Zvonareva				not played
5	(Spain) (Russia)	Nuria Llagostera Vives / Virginia Ruano Pascual; Elena Vesnina / Ekaterina Makarova	2; 6	1; 6

World Group play-offs

Date: 26–27 April

Venue (surface)	Home team	Score	Visiting team
Ramat HaSharon, Israel (hard)	Israel	2–3	Czech Republic
Buenos Aires, Argentina (clay)	Argentina	3–2	Germany
Tokyo, Japan (indoor hard)	Japan	1–4	France
Olbia, Italy (clay)	Italy	3–2	Ukraine

=== 2008 Hopman Cup ===
The Hopman Cup is the Official Mixed Team Competition of the ITF, played at the Burswood Entertainment Complex, in Perth, Australia. It is considered an exhibition competition as players do not gain ranking points for competing in the tournament. This year the USA's pairing of Mardy Fish and Serena Williams (who was replaced for the first group match by Meghann Shaughnessy) defeated Novak Djokovic and Jelena Janković of Serbia in the final. This was the 20th edition of the competition.

Group A

Pos.	Country	W	L	Matches	Sets
1.	Serbia	3	0	7–2	15–8
2.	France	2	1	6–3	13–7
3.	Chinese Taipei	1	2	3–6	9–14
4.	Argentina	0	3	2–7	7–15

Group B

Pos.	Country	W	L	Matches	Sets
1.	United States	3	0	8–1	16–4
2.	India	1	2	4–5	10–12
3.	Australia	1	2	3–6	8–12
4.	Czech Republic	1	2	3–6	7–13

==== Final ====
Serbia
1
Burswood Entertainment Complex, Perth
4 January 2008, 18:00 AWST (UTC+8)
hard (indoors)

United States
2

			1	2	3
1	(Serbia) (United States)	Jelena Janković; Serena Williams				w/o
2	(Serbia) (United States)	Novak Djokovic; Mardy Fish	6; 2	6; 7	7; 6
3	(Serbia) (United States)	Jelena Janković / Novak Djokovic; Serena Williams / Mardy Fish	6^{5} 7^{7}	2; 6

== 2008 Beijing Olympics ==
- Men's singles: (Spain) Rafael Nadal def. (Chile) Fernando González, 6–3, 7–6(2), 6–3
  - Bronze Medal: (Serbia) Novak Djokovic def. (United States) James Blake, 6–3, 7–6(4)
- Women's singles: (Russia) Elena Dementieva def. (Russia) Dinara Safina, 3–6, 7–5, 6–3
  - Bronze Medal: (Russia) Vera Zvonareva def (China) Li Na, 6–0, 7–5
- Men's doubles: (Switzerland) Roger Federer & Stanislas Wawrinka def. (Sweden) Simon Aspelin & Thomas Johansson, 6–3, 6–4, 6–7(4), 6–3
  - Bronze Medal: (United States) Bob Bryan & Mike Bryan def. (France) Arnaud Clément & Michaël Llodra, 3–6, 6–3, 6–4
- Women's doubles: (United States) Serena Williams & Venus Williams def. (Spain) Anabel Medina Garrigues & Virginia Ruano Pascual, 6–2, 6–0
  - Bronze Medal: (China) Yan Zi & Zheng Jie def. (Ukraine) Alona Bondarenko & Kateryna Bondarenko, 6–2, 6–2

== 2008 ATP Tour ==
=== Tennis Masters Cup ===
- Shanghai, P.R. China (November 9 – November 16)
  - Singles: (Serbia) Novak Djokovic def. (Russia) Nikolay Davydenko, 6–1, 7–5
  - Doubles: (Canada) Daniel Nestor & (Serbia) Nenad Zimonjić def. (United States) Bob Bryan & (United States) Mike Bryan, 7–6(3), 6–2

=== ATP Masters Series ===
Tournament	Singles Winner	Runner-up	Score	Doubles Winners	Runners-up	Score
Indian Wells outdoor/hardcourt	(Serbia) Novak Djokovic	(United States) Mardy Fish	6–2, 5–7, 6–3	(Israel) J Erlich / (Israel) A Ram	(Canada) D Nestor / (Serbia) N Zimonjić	6–4, 6–4
Miami outdoor/hardcourt	(Russia) Nikolay Davydenko	(Spain) Rafael Nadal	6–4, 6–2	(United States) B Bryan / (United States) M Bryan	(India) M Bhupathi / (The Bahamas) M Knowles	6–2, 6–2
Monte Carlo outdoor/clay	(Spain) Rafael Nadal	(Switzerland) Roger Federer	7–5, 7–5	(Spain) R Nadal / (Spain) T Robredo	(India) M Bhupathi / (The Bahamas) M Knowles	6–3, 6–3
Rome outdoor/clay	(Serbia) Novak Djokovic	(Switzerland) Stanislas Wawrinka	4–6, 6–3, 6–3	(United States) B Bryan / (United States) M Bryan	(Canada) D Nestor / (Serbia) N Zimonjić	3–6, 6–4, [10–8]
Hamburg outdoor/clay	(Spain) Rafael Nadal	(Switzerland) Roger Federer	7–5, 6–7(3), 6–3	(Canada) D Nestor / (Serbia) N Zimonjić	(United States) B Bryan / (United States) M Bryan	4–6, 7–5, [10–8]
Toronto outdoor/hardcourt	(Spain) Rafael Nadal	(Germany) Nicolas Kiefer	6–3, 6–2	(Canada) D Nestor / (Serbia) N Zimonjić	(United States) B Bryan / (United States) M Bryan	6–2, 4–6, [10–8]
Cincinnati outdoor/hardcourt	(United Kingdom) Andy Murray	(Serbia) Novak Djokovic	7–6(4), 7–6(5)	(United States) B Bryan / (United States) M Bryan	(Israel) J Erlich / (Israel) A Ram	4–6, 7–6(2), [10–7]
Madrid indoor/hardcourt	(United Kingdom) Andy Murray	(France) Gilles Simon	6–4, 7–6(6)	(Poland) M Fyrstenberg / (Poland) M Matkowski	(India) M Bhupathi / (The Bahamas) M Knowles	6–4, 6–2
Paris indoor/carpet	(France) Jo-Wilfried Tsonga	(Argentina) David Nalbandian	6–3, 4–6, 6–4	(Sweden) J Björkman / (Zimbabwe) K Ullyett	(South Africa) J Coetzee / (South Africa) W Moodie	6–2, 6–2

=== 2008 World Team Cup ===
Round Robin

- TP: Ties Played
- TW: Ties Won
- MW: Matches Won
- SW: Sets Won

Blue Group	TP	TW	MW	SW
Russia	3	2	6	12
Italy	3	2	5	13
Germany	3	1	3	8
Spain	3	1	4	9

Red Group	TP	TW	MW	SW
Sweden	3	3	8	16
United States	3	2	4	10
Argentina	3	1	4	10
Czech Republic	3	0	2	7

==== Final ====
Russia
1
Düsseldorf, Germany
24 May 2008, 12:00 CEST (UTC+2)
clay

Sweden
2

			1	2	3
1	(Russia) (Sweden)	Mikhail Youzhny; Robin Söderling	3; 6	1; 6
2	(Russia) (Sweden)	Igor Andreev; Thomas Johansson	2; 6	6; 3	6; 4
3	(Russia) (Sweden)	Dmitry Tursunov / Mikhail Youzhny; Robert Lindstedt / Robin Söderling	6; 4	6^{5} 7^{7}	9; 11

== 2008 Sony Ericsson WTA Tour ==
=== WTA Tour Championships ===
- Doha, Qatar (November 4 – November 9)
  - Singles: (United States) Venus Williams def. (Russia) Vera Zvonareva, 6–7(5), 6–0, 6–2
  - Doubles: (Zimbabwe) Cara Black & (United States) Liezel Huber def. (Czech Republic) Květa Peschke & (Australia) Rennae Stubbs, 6–1, 7–5

=== WTA Tier 1 Series ===
Tournament	Singles Winner	Runner-up	Score	Doubles Winners	Runners-up	Score
Doha, Qatar: Qatar Total Open, outdoor hardcourt	(Russia) Maria Sharapova	(Russia) Vera Zvonareva	6–1, 2–6, 6–0	(Czech Republic) K Peschke / (Australia) R Stubbs	(Zimbabwe) C Black / (United States) L Huber	6–1, 5–7, [10–7]
Indian Wells, California, USA: Pacific Life Open, outdoor hardcourt	(Serbia) Ana Ivanovic	(Russia) Svetlana Kuznetsova	6–4, 6–3	(Russia) D Safina / (Russia) E Vesnina	(China) Z Yan / (China) J Zheng	6–1, 1–6, [10–8]
Miami, Florida, USA: Sony Ericsson Open, outdoor hardcourt	(United States) Serena Williams	(Serbia) Jelena Janković	6–1, 5–7, 6–3	(Slovenia) K Srebotnik / (Japan) A Sugiyama	(Zimbabwe) C Black / (United States) L Huber	7–5, 4–6, [10–3]
Charleston, South Carolina, USA: Family Circle Cup, outdoor clay	(United States) Serena Williams	(Russia) Vera Zvonareva	6–3, 3–6, 6–3	(Slovenia) K Srebotnik / (Japan) A Sugiyama	(Romania) E Gallovits / (Belarus) O Govortsova	6–2, 6–2
Berlin, Germany: Qatar Total German Open, outdoor clay	(Russia) Dinara Safina	(Russia) Elena Dementieva	3–6, 6–2, 6–2	(Zimbabwe) C Black / (United States) L Huber	(Spain) N Llagostera Vives / (Spain) MJ Martínez Sánchez	3–6, 6–2, [10–2]
Rome, Italy: Internazionali d'Italia, outdoor clay	(Serbia) Jelena Janković	(France) Alizé Cornet	6–2, 6–2	(Chinese Taipei) C Yung-jan / (Chinese Taipei) C Chia-jung	(Czech Republic) I Benešová / (Slovakia) J Husárová	7–6(5), 6–3
Montreal, Quebec, Canada: Rogers Cup presented by National Bank, outdoor hardcourt	(Russia) Dinara Safina	(Slovakia) Dominika Cibulková	6–2, 6–1	(Zimbabwe) C Black / (United States) L Huber	(Russia) M Kirilenko / (Italy) F Pennetta	6–1, 6–1
Tokyo, Japan: Toray Pan Pacific Open, indoor hardcourt	(Russia) Dinara Safina	(Russia) Svetlana Kuznetsova	6–1, 6–3	(United States) V King / (Russia) N Petrova	(United States) L Raymond / (Australia) S Stosur	6–1, 6–4
Moscow, Russia: Kremlin Cup, indoor carpet	(Serbia) Jelena Janković	(Russia) Vera Zvonareva	6–2, 6–4	(Russia) N Petrova / (Slovenia) K Srebotnik	(Zimbabwe) C Black / (United States) L Huber	6–4, 6–4

== Exhibition tournaments ==
=== AAMI Kooyong Classic ===
(United States) Andy Roddick def. (Cyprus) Marcos Baghdatis, 7–5, 6–3

=== JB Group Classic ===
(United States) Venus Williams def. (Russia) Maria Sharapova, 6–4, 6–3

=== Tradition-ICAP Liverpool International ===
- Men's Singles: (United States) Amer Delic def. (Chile) Paul Capdeville, 6–7(3), 6–4, [10–7]
- Women's Singles: (Denmark) Caroline Wozniacki def. (United States) Ashley Harkleroad, 4–6, 6–4, [10–5]

=== Boodles Challenge ===
(Germany) Nicolas Kiefer def. (Spain) Tommy Robredo, 6–3, 3–6, [13–11]

== Retired ==
- May
  - 14: Justine Henin (Belgium)

== International Tennis Hall of Fame ==
- Class of 2008:
  - Michael Chang, player
  - Mark McCormack, contributor
  - Gene Scott, contributor

== See also ==
- 2008 Australian Open
- 2008 French Open
- 2008 Wimbledon Championships
- 2008 US Open
- Tennis at the 2008 Summer Olympics
