= 2008 Medibank International – Men's doubles =

Men's doubles
- 2008 Medibank International

Final
- Champions: (France) Richard Gasquet (France) Jo-Wilfried Tsonga
- Runners-up: (United States) Bob Bryan (United States) Mike Bryan
- Score: 4–6, 6–4, [11–9]

Events
Singles	men	women
Doubles	men	women
← 2007 ·	Sydney International	· 2009 →

Paul Hanley and Kevin Ullyett were the defending champions. They were both present but did not compete together.
Hanley partnered with Leander Paes, but lost in the first round to Martin Damm and Pavel Vízner.
Ullyett partnered with Eric Butorac, but lost in the first round to Alun Jones and Joseph Sirianni.

Richard Gasquet and Jo-Wilfried Tsonga won in the final 4–6, 6–4, [11–9], against Bob Bryan and Mike Bryan.

== Seeds ==
1. (United States) Bob Bryan / (United States) Mike Bryan (final)
2. (Canada) Daniel Nestor / (Serbia) Nenad Zimonjić (first round)
3. (Sweden) Simon Aspelin / (Austria) Julian Knowle (quarterfinals)
4. (Czech Republic) Martin Damm / (Czech Republic) Pavel Vízner (quarterfinals)

== Draw ==
=== Key ===
- Q = Qualifier
- WC = Wild card
- LL = Lucky loser
- Alt = Alternate
- SE = Special exempt
- PR = Protected ranking
- ITF = ITF entry
- JE = Junior exempt
- w/o = Walkover
- r = Retired
- d = Defaulted
- SR = Special ranking

=== Draw ===
First round
1	(United States) B Bryan (United States) M Bryan	6	6
(Belarus) M Mirnyi (United Kingdom) J Murray	4	2
(Israel) J Erlich (Israel) A Ram	7	6
(France) G Simon (Spain) F Verdasco	5	2
3	(Sweden) S Aspelin (Austria) J Knowle	6	6
(France) N Mahut (France) F Santoro	3	3
WC	(Australia) A Jones (Australia) J Sirianni	6	7
(United States) E Butorac (Zimbabwe) K Ullyett	3	6^{5}
WC	(Australia) C Guccione (Australia) R Smeets	4	6	[6]
(France) R Gasquet (France) J-W Tsonga	6	2	[10]
(Australia) P Hanley (India) L Paes	6^{5}	4
4	(Czech Republic) M Damm (Czech Republic) P Vízner	7	6
(India) M Bhupathi (The Bahamas) M Knowles	4	4
(Czech Republic) T Berdych (Czech Republic) R Štěpánek	6	6
(Poland) M Fyrstenberg (Poland) M Matkowski	7	6
2	(Canada) D Nestor (Serbia) N Zimonjić	6^{5}	4

Quarterfinals
1	(United States) B Bryan (United States) M Bryan	7	3	[11]
(Israel) J Erlich (Israel) A Ram	6^{1}	6	[9]
3	(Sweden) S Aspelin (Austria) J Knowle	3	5
WC	(Australia) A Jones (Australia) J Sirianni	6	7
(France) R Gasquet (France) J-W Tsonga	6	3	[10]
4	(Czech Republic) M Damm (Czech Republic) P Vízner	3	6	[5]
(Czech Republic) T Berdych (Czech Republic) R Štěpánek
(Poland) M Fyrstenberg (Poland) M Matkowski	w/o

Semifinals
1	(United States) B Bryan (United States) M Bryan	6	6
WC	(Australia) A Jones (Australia) J Sirianni	3	4
(France) R Gasquet (France) J-W Tsonga	3	6	[10]
(Poland) M Fyrstenberg (Poland) M Matkowski	6	4	[4]

Final
1	(United States) B Bryan (United States) M Bryan	6	4	[9]
(France) R Gasquet (France) J-W Tsonga	4	6	[11]
