= 2008 Medibank International – Women's doubles =

Women's doubles
- 2008 Medibank International

Final
- Champions: (China) Yan Zi (China) Zheng Jie
- Runners-up: (Ukraine) Tatiana Perebiynis (Belarus) Tatiana Poutchek
- Score: 6–4, 7–6^{(7–5)}

Events
Singles	men	women
Doubles	men	women
← 2007 ·	Sydney International	· 2009 →

Anna-Lena Grönefeld and Meghann Shaughnessy were the defending champions, but chose not to participate that year.

Yan Zi and Zheng Jie won in the final 6–4, 7–6^{(7–5)}, against Tatiana Perebiynis and Tatiana Poutchek.

== Seeds ==
1. (Zimbabwe) Cara Black / (United States) Liezel Huber (quarterfinals)
2. (Slovenia) Katarina Srebotnik / (Japan) Ai Sugiyama (quarterfinals)
3. (Chinese Taipei) Chan Yung-jan / (Chinese Taipei) Chuang Chia-jung (quarterfinals)
4. (Czech Republic) Květa Peschke / (Australia) Rennae Stubbs (first round)

== Draw ==
=== Key ===
- Q = Qualifier
- WC = Wild card
- LL = Lucky loser
- Alt = Alternate
- SE = Special exempt
- PR = Protected ranking
- ITF = ITF entry
- JE = Junior exempt
- w/o = Walkover
- r = Retired
- d = Defaulted
- SR = Special ranking

=== Draw ===
First round
1	(Zimbabwe) C Black (United States) L Huber	6	6
(Australia) N Pratt (Australia) B Stewart	1	2
(Australia) A Molik (China) T Sun	6	6
WC	(Australia) S Ferguson (Australia) T Musgrave	3	3
3	(Chinese Taipei) Y-j Chan (Chinese Taipei) C-j Chuang	7	6
(Italy) ME Camerin (United States) J Craybas	6^{4}	3
(United States) L Raymond (Italy) F Schiavone	7	3	[7]
(Ukraine) T Perebiynis (Belarus) T Poutchek	5	6	[10]
(Sweden) S Arvidsson (Ukraine) Y Fedak
(France) N Dechy (Russia) D Safina	w/o
(United States) L Granville (Czech Republic) V Uhlířová	6	3	[10]
4	(Czech Republic) K Peschke (Australia) R Stubbs	4	6	[5]
(China) Z Yan (China) J Zheng	3	7	[10]
(Uzbekistan) A Amanmuradova (Russia) E Makarova	6	6^{3}	4
(Italy) S Errani (Italy) T Garbin	2	4
2	(Slovenia) K Srebotnik (Japan) A Sugiyama	6	6

Quarterfinals
1	(Zimbabwe) C Black (United States) L Huber	6	3	[7]
(Australia) A Molik (China) T Sun	3	6	[10]
3	(Chinese Taipei) Y-j Chan (Chinese Taipei) C-j Chuang	4	4
(Ukraine) T Perebiynis (Belarus) T Poutchek	6	6
(France) N Dechy (Russia) D Safina	6	6
(United States) L Granville (Czech Republic) V Uhlířová	1	2
(China) Z Yan (China) J Zheng	6	6
2	(Slovenia) K Srebotnik (Japan) A Sugiyama	4	1

Semifinals
(Australia) A Molik (China) T Sun	4	6	[8]
(Ukraine) T Perebiynis (Belarus) T Poutchek	6	2	[10]
(France) N Dechy (Russia) D Safina	5	1
(China) Z Yan (China) J Zheng	7	6

Final
(Ukraine) T Perebiynis (Belarus) T Poutchek	4	6^{5}
(China) Z Yan (China) J Zheng	6	7
