= 2009 Medibank International Sydney =

- Date: 11–17 January
- Edition: 117th
- Surface: Hard / outdoor
- Location: Sydney, Australia
- Venue: NSW Tennis Centre

Champions

Men's singles
- (Argentina) David Nalbandian

Women's singles
- (Russia) Elena Dementieva

Men's doubles
- (United States) Bob Bryan / (United States) Mike Bryan

Women's doubles
- (Chinese Taipei) Su-Wei Hsieh / (China) Peng Shuai
- Medibank International Sydney

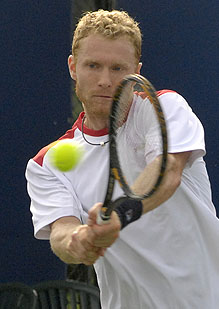
Men's singles defending champion Dmitry Tursunov

The 2009 Medibank International Sydney was a tennis tournament played on outdoor hard courts. It was the 117th edition of the event known that year as the Medibank International Sydney, and was part of the ATP World Tour 250 series of the 2009 ATP World Tour, and of the WTA Premier tournaments of the 2009 WTA Tour. Both the men's and the women's events took place at the NSW Tennis Centre in Sydney, Australia, from 11 through 17 January 2009.

The men's singles line up was headlined by Association of Tennis Professionals (ATP) No. 3, reigning Australian Open and Indian Wells Masters champion, recent Tennis Masters Cup winner Novak Djokovic, 2008 Australian Open runner-up, Bangkok and Paris Masters titlist, Sydney doubles defending champion Jo-Wilfried Tsonga, and Madrid Masters finalist, Casablanca, Indianapolis and Bucharest champion Gilles Simon. Other top seeds competing were Buenos Aires and Stockholm champion David Nalbandian, Gstaad and Umag finalist Igor Andreev, Richard Gasquet, Tomáš Berdych, Tommy Robredo and Dmitry Tursunov.

The women's draw was led by Women's Tennis Association (WTA) No. 2, Wimbledon finalist and US Open champion, Bangalore, Miami and Charleston winner Serena Williams, French Open runner-up, Beijing Olympics silver medalist, Berlin, Los Angeles, Montreal and Tokyo titlist Dinara Safina, and Beijing Olympics gold medalist, Dubai and Luxembourg winner Elena Dementieva. Other players present were WTA Tour Championships runner-up, Prague and Guangzhou titlist Vera Zvonareva, French Open semifinalist Svetlana Kuznetsova, Agnieszka Radwańska, Nadia Petrova and Caroline Wozniacki.

== Finals ==
=== Men's singles ===
(Argentina) David Nalbandian defeated (Finland) Jarkko Nieminen, 6–3, 6–7^{(9–11)}, 6–2

- It was Nalbandian's 1st title of the year and 10th overall.

=== Women's singles ===
(Russia) Elena Dementieva defeated (Russia) Dinara Safina, 6–3, 2–6, 6–1

- It was Dementieva's 2nd title of the year and 13th of her career.

=== Men's doubles ===
(United States) Bob Bryan / (United States) Mike Bryan defeated (Canada) Daniel Nestor / (Serbia) Nenad Zimonjić, 6–1, 7–6^{(7–3)}

=== Women's doubles ===
(Chinese Taipei) Hsieh Su-wei / (China) Peng Shuai defeated (France) Nathalie Dechy / (Australia) Casey Dellacqua, 6–0, 6–1
