= 2009 Medibank International Sydney – Men's doubles =

Men's Doubles at 2009 Medibank International at Sydney

Men's doubles
- 2009 Medibank International Sydney

Final
- Champions: (United States) Bob Bryan (United States) Mike Bryan
- Runners-up: (Canada) Daniel Nestor (Serbia) Nenad Zimonjić
- Score: 6–1, 7–6^{(7–3)}

Events
Singles	men	women
Doubles	men	women
← 2008 ·	Sydney International	· 2010 →

Richard Gasquet and Jo-Wilfried Tsonga were the defending champions, but both chose not to participate that year.

Bob Bryan and Mike Bryan won in the final 6–1, 7–6^{(7–3)}, against Daniel Nestor and Nenad Zimonjić.

== Seeds ==
1. (Canada) Daniel Nestor / (Serbia) Nenad Zimonjić (finals)
2. (United States) Bob Bryan / (United States) Mike Bryan (champions)
3. (India) Mahesh Bhupathi / (The Bahamas) Mark Knowles (semifinals)
4. (Poland) Mariusz Fyrstenberg / (Poland) Marcin Matkowski (semifinals)

== Draw ==
=== Key ===
- Q = Qualifier
- WC = Wild card
- LL = Lucky loser
- Alt = Alternate
- SE = Special exempt
- PR = Protected ranking
- ITF = ITF entry
- JE = Junior exempt
- w/o = Walkover
- r = Retired
- d = Defaulted
- SR = Special ranking

=== Draw ===
First round
1	(Canada) D Nestor (Serbia) N Zimonjić	6	6
(Russia) I Andreev (Finland) J Nieminen	4	4
(Brazil) M Melo (Brazil) A Sá	6	6
WC	(Australia) C Ball (Australia) C Guccione	4	4
4	(Poland) M Fyrstenberg (Poland) M Matkowski	4	7	[10]
(United Kingdom) J Murray (Serbia) D Vemić	6	6^{5}	[2]
(Argentina) L Arnold Ker (Argentina) D Nalbandian	2	6	[10]
(Austria) J Knowle (Austria) J Melzer	6	2	[8]
(Sweden) S Aspelin (Czech Republic) P Vízner	6	7
WC	(Australia) S Goh (Australia) B Klein	4	6^{3}
(Brazil) B Soares (Zimbabwe) K Ullyett	5	7	7
3	(India) M Bhupathi (The Bahamas) M Knowles	7	5	[10]
(Spain) F López (Spain) T Robredo	7	4	[10]
(Belarus) M Mirnyi (Israel) A Ram	5	6	[6]
(Italy) S Bolelli (Italy) A Seppi	3	2
2	(United States) B Bryan (United States) M Bryan	6	6

Quarterfinals
1	(Canada) D Nestor (Serbia) N Zimonjić	6	7
(Brazil) M Melo (Brazil) A Sá	4	5
4	(Poland) M Fyrstenberg (Poland) M Matkowski	6	3	[10]
(Argentina) L Arnold Ker (Argentina) D Nalbandian	2	6	8
(Sweden) S Aspelin (Czech Republic) P Vízner	3	2
3	(India) M Bhupathi (The Bahamas) M Knowles	6	6
(Spain) F López (Spain) T Robredo	6^{8}	6^{5}
2	(United States) B Bryan (United States) M Bryan	7	7

Semifinals
1	(Canada) D Nestor (Serbia) N Zimonjić	2	7	[10]
4	(Poland) M Fyrstenberg (Poland) M Matkowski	6	5	[5]
3	(India) M Bhupathi (The Bahamas) M Knowles	1	7	[5]
2	(United States) B Bryan (United States) M Bryan	6	6^{4}	[10]

Final
1	(Canada) D Nestor (Serbia) N Zimonjić	1	6^{3}
2	(United States) B Bryan (United States) M Bryan	6	7
