= 2009 Medibank International Sydney – Women's doubles =

Women's doubles
- 2009 Medibank International Sydney

Final
- Champions: (Chinese Taipei) Hsieh Su-wei (China) Peng Shuai
- Runners-up: (France) Nathalie Dechy (Australia) Casey Dellacqua
- Score: 6–0, 6–1

Details
- Draw: 16
- Seeds: 4

Events
Singles	men	women
Doubles	men	women
← 2008 ·	Sydney International	· 2010 →

Yan Zi and Zheng Jie were the defending champions but both chose not to participate that year.

In the final, Hsieh Su-wei and Peng Shuai defeated Nathalie Dechy and Casey Dellacqua, 6–0, 6–1.

== Seeds ==
1. (Zimbabwe) Cara Black / (United States) Liezel Huber (semifinal)
2. (Spain) Anabel Medina Garrigues / (Spain) Virginia Ruano Pascual (first round)
3. (Czech Republic) Květa Peschke / (United States) Lisa Raymond (quarterfinals)
4. (Australia) Samantha Stosur / (Australia) Rennae Stubbs (first round)

== Draw ==
Key

- Q = Qualifier
- WC = Wild card
- LL = Lucky loser
- Alt = Alternate
- ITF = ITF entry
- PR = Protected ranking
- SR = Special ranking
- SE = Special exempt
- JE = Junior exempt
- JR = Junior Accelerator Programme entrant
- CO = College Accelerator Programme entrant
- NG = Next Gen Accelerator Program entrant
- w/o = Walkover
- r = Retired
- d = Defaulted

=== Draw ===
First round
1	(Zimbabwe) C Black (United States) L Huber	6	6
(Germany) A-L Grönefeld (China) T Sun	4	1
(Romania) S Cîrstea (Russia) V Dushevina	6	3	[10]
WC	(Russia) S Kuznetsova (Russia) N Petrova	2	6	[6]
3	(Czech Republic) K Peschke (United States) L Raymond	6	4	[11]
(Slovakia) D Hantuchová (Japan) A Sugiyama	2	6	[9]
(Russia) A Rodionova (Kazakhstan) Y Shvedova	6^{3}	6^{5}
(France) N Dechy (Australia) C Dellacqua	7	7
(United States) R Kops-Jones (Czech Republic) V Uhlířová	6	2	[4]
(United States) J Craybas (Kazakhstan) G Voskoboeva	4	6	[10]
(Chinese Taipei) S-w Hsieh (China) S Peng	7	7
4	(Australia) S Stosur (Australia) R Stubbs	5	5
WC	(Australia) A Bai (Australia) T Calderwood	1	1
(Spain) N Llagostera Vives (Spain) MJ Martínez Sánchez	6	6
(Russia) M Kirilenko (Poland) A Radwańska	6	7
2	(Spain) A Medina Garrigues (Spain) V Ruano Pascual	2	5

Quarterfinals
1	(Zimbabwe) C Black (United States) L Huber	4	6	[10]
(Romania) S Cîrstea (Russia) V Dushevina	6	2	[6]
3	(Czech Republic) K Peschke (United States) L Raymond	3	2
(France) N Dechy (Australia) C Dellacqua	6	6
(United States) J Craybas (Kazakhstan) G Voskoboeva	0	4
(Chinese Taipei) S-w Hsieh (China) S Peng	6	6
(Spain) N Llagostera Vives (Spain) MJ Martínez Sánchez	6	6
(Russia) M Kirilenko (Poland) A Radwańska	4	4

Semifinals
1	(Zimbabwe) C Black (United States) L Huber	6^{2}	6	[5]
(France) N Dechy (Australia) C Dellacqua	7	1	[10]
(Chinese Taipei) S-w Hsieh (China) S Peng	6	6
(Spain) N Llagostera Vives (Spain) MJ Martínez Sánchez	2	1

Final
(France) N Dechy (Australia) C Dellacqua	0	1
(Chinese Taipei) S-w Hsieh (China) S Peng	6	6
