= 2009 Medibank International Sydney – Men's singles =

Men's singles
- 2009 Medibank International Sydney

Final
- Champion: (Argentina) David Nalbandian
- Runner-up: (Finland) Jarkko Nieminen
- Score: 6–3, 6–7^{(9–11)}, 6–2

Details
- Draw: 28
- Seeds: 8

Events
Singles	men	women
Doubles	men	women
← 2008 ·	Sydney International	· 2010 →

Dmitry Tursunov was the defending champion, but lost in the first round to Richard Gasquet.

David Nalbandian won in the final 6–3, 6–7^{(9–11)}, 6–2, against Jarkko Nieminen.

== Seeds ==
The top four seeds receive a bye to the second round.

1. (Serbia) Novak Djokovic (semifinals)
2. (France) Gilles Simon (second round)
3. (France) Jo-Wilfried Tsonga (quarterfinals, withdrew due to a back injury)
4. (Argentina) David Nalbandian (champion)
5. (Russia) Igor Andreev (second round)
6. (Czech Republic) Tomáš Berdych (first round)
7. (Spain) Tommy Robredo (second round)
8. (United States) Mardy Fish (first round)

== Draw ==
=== Key ===
- Q = Qualifier
- WC = Wild card
- LL = Lucky loser
- Alt = Alternate
- SE = Special exempt
- PR = Protected ranking
- ITF = ITF entry
- JE = Junior exempt
- w/o = Walkover
- r = Retired
- d = Defaulted
- SR = Special ranking

=== Finals ===
Semifinals
1/WC	(Serbia) Novak Djokovic	4	6^{3}
(Finland) Jarkko Nieminen	6	7
4	(Argentina) David Nalbandian	6	6
(France) Richard Gasquet	4	3

Final
(Finland) Jarkko Nieminen	3	7	2
4	(Argentina) David Nalbandian	6	6^{9}	6

=== Top half ===
First round
(Italy) A Seppi	2	6	3
(France) P-H Mathieu	6	2	6
(Croatia) M Ančić	4	7	6
Q	(Belgium) X Malisse	6	6^{5}	3
(Austria) J Melzer	3	4
7	(Spain) T Robredo	6	6
(Italy) S Bolelli	7	6
LL	(Italy) P Starace	6^{1}	4
(Finland) J Nieminen	6	7
(Spain) F López	2	6^{9}
WC	(Australia) C Guccione	6	6
6	(Czech Republic) T Berdych	3	4

Second round
1/WC	(Serbia) N Djokovic	6	6
(France) P-H Mathieu	1	2
(Croatia) M Ančić	6	6
7	(Spain) T Robredo	2	1
3	(France) J-W Tsonga	6	6
(Italy) S Bolelli	4	1
(Finland) J Nieminen	7	6
WC	(Australia) C Guccione	6^{8}	3

Quarterfinals
1/WC	(Serbia) N Djokovic	6	6
(Croatia) M Ančić	3	4
3	(France) J-W Tsonga
(Finland) J Nieminen	w/o

Semifinals
1/WC	(Serbia) N Djokovic	4	6^{3}
(Finland) J Nieminen	6	7

=== Bottom half ===
First round
8	(United States) M Fish	4	6	4
(Serbia) J Tipsarević	6	3	6
(France) J Benneteau	7	2	4
WC	(Australia) L Hewitt	5	6	6
Q	(Germany) D Gremelmayr	0	2
(France) M Llodra	6	6
5	(Russia) I Andreev	7	6
Q	(Canada) F Dancevic	6^{2}	3
Q	(France) J Chardy	6	3
(Czech Republic) R Štěpánek	4	0	r
(Russia) D Tursunov	6^{4}	4
(France) R Gasquet	7	6

Second round
(Serbia) J Tipsarević	5	4
WC	(Australia) L Hewitt	7	6
(France) M Llodra	1	3
4	(Argentina) D Nalbandian	6	6
5	(Russia) I Andreev	4	6	4
Q	(France) J Chardy	6	4	6
(France) R Gasquet	6	6
2	(France) G Simon	4	4

Quarterfinals
WC	(Australia) L Hewitt	6^{3}	5
4	(Argentina) D Nalbandian	7	7
Q	(France) J Chardy	2	6^{4}
(France) R Gasquet	6	7

Semifinals
4	(Argentina) D Nalbandian	6	6
(France) R Gasquet	4	3

== Qualifying draw ==
=== Seeds ===
1. (France) ~~Julien Benneteau~~ (moved Into main draw)
2. (Russia) Teymuraz Gabashvili (first round)
3. (Italy) Potito Starace (qualifying competition, lucky loser)
4. (France) Nicolas Devilder (first round)
5. (France) Jérémy Chardy (qualified)
6. (Czech Republic) Jan Hernych (second round)
7. (Germany) Denis Gremelmayr (qualified)
8. (Ecuador) Nicolás Lapentti (first round)
9. (Kazakhstan) Andrey Golubev (first round)

=== Qualifiers ===
1. (Canada) Frank Dancevic
2. (Belgium) Xavier Malisse
3. (Germany) Denis Gremelmayr
4. (France) Jérémy Chardy

=== Lucky loser ===
1. (Italy) Potito Starace

=== First qualifier ===
First round
9	(Kazakhstan) Andrey Golubev	6^{6}	6	4
(Kazakhstan) Evgeny Korolev	7^{8}	3	6
(Canada) Frank Dancevic	6	6
(Slovenia) Grega Žemlja	0	2
(Spain) Alberto Martín	6	6
WC	(Australia) Brendan Mckenzie	2	1
Alt	(Australia) Sadik Kadir	6	6
8	(Ecuador) Nicolás Lapentti	3	2

Second round
(Kazakhstan) Evgeny Korolev	3	2
(Canada) Frank Dancevic	6	6
(Spain) Alberto Martín	6	6
Alt	(Australia) Sadik Kadir	2	2

Qualifying competition
(Canada) Frank Dancevic	6	6
(Spain) Alberto Martín	4	3

=== Second qualifier ===
First round
2	(Russia) Teymuraz Gabashvili	2	3
(Belgium) Xavier Malisse	6	6
(France) Adrian Mannarino	6	6
(United States) Robert Kendrick	2	4
(France) Arnaud Clément	2	4
(Australia) Peter Luczak	6	6
(Australia) Robert Smeets	6	3	2
6	(Czech Republic) Jan Hernych	3	6	6

Second round
(Belgium) Xavier Malisse	6	6
(France) Adrian Mannarino	3	1
(Australia) Peter Luczak	6	6
6	(Czech Republic) Jan Hernych	1	3

Qualifying competition
(Belgium) Xavier Malisse	6	6
(Australia) Peter Luczak	2	4

=== Third qualifier ===
First round
3	(Italy) Potito Starace	6	4	6
(United Kingdom) Brydan Klein	4	6	2
(Uzbekistan) Denis Istomin	6	6
(Russia) Mikhail Elgin	2	3
(South Africa) Kevin Anderson	7	6
WC	(Australia) Steven Goh	5	1
(Bosnia and Herzegovina) Amer Delić	4	6^{4}
7	(Germany) Denis Gremelmayr	6	7^{7}

Second round
3	(Italy) Potito Starace	7^{8}	6
(Uzbekistan) Denis Istomin	6^{6}	2
(South Africa) Kevin Anderson	7^{7}	6^{6}	4
7	(Germany) Denis Gremelmayr	6^{4}	7^{8}	6

Qualifying competition
3	(Italy) Potito Starace	2	4
7	(Germany) Denis Gremelmayr	6	6

=== Fourth qualifier ===
First round
4	(France) Nicolas Devilder	4	5
(Czech Republic) Ivo Minář	6	7
(Serbia) Dušan Vemić	2	4
(Spain) Pere Riba	6	6
WC	(Australia) Dane Propoggia	2	3
WC	(Australia) Greg Jones	6	6
(South Korea) Jun Woong-sun	6	5	4
5	(France) Jérémy Chardy	3	7	6

Second round
(Czech Republic) Ivo Minář	6	6
(Spain) Pere Riba	2	4
WC	(Australia) Greg Jones	4	6^{3}
5	(France) Jérémy Chardy	6	7^{7}

Qualifying competition
(Czech Republic) Ivo Minář	3	6	6^{2}
5	(France) Jérémy Chardy	6	3	7^{7}
