= 2007 Medibank International – Women's singles =

Women's singles
- 2007 Medibank International

Final
- Champion: (Belgium) Kim Clijsters
- Runner-up: (Serbia) Jelena Janković
- Score: 4–6, 7–6, 6–4

Details
- Draw: 28
- Seeds: 8

Events
Singles	men	women
Doubles	men	women
- Sydney International

The 2007 Women's Medibank International began on 7 January 2007, and finished 13 January 2007.

Justine Henin was the defending champion, but did not participate this year.

Kim Clijsters won in the final 4–6, 7–6, 6–4, against Jelena Janković.

== Seeds ==
The seeded players are listed below. Players in bold are still in the competition. The players no longer in the tournament are listed with the round in which they exited.

1. (France) Amélie Mauresmo (quarterfinals)
2. (Russia) Svetlana Kuznetsova (second round)
3. (Belgium) **Kim Clijsters (champion)**
4. (Russia) Nadia Petrova (second round)
5. (Switzerland) Martina Hingis (first round)
6. (Russia) Elena Dementieva (second round)
7. (Switzerland) Patty Schnyder (second round)
8. (Czech Republic) Nicole Vaidišová (semifinals)

== Draw ==
=== Key ===
- Q = Qualifier
- WC = Wild card
- r = Retired

==== Finals ====
Semifinals
(Serbia) **Jelena Janković**	**6**	4	**6**
8	(Czech Republic) Nicole Vaidišová	4	**6**	4
3	(Belgium) **Kim Clijsters**	**6**	1	**7**
(China) Li Na	1	**6**	5

Finals
(Serbia) Jelena Janković	**6**	6^{1}	4
3	(Belgium) **Kim Clijsters**	4	**7^{7}**	**6**

==== Top half ====
First round
(France) **T Golovin**	**6**	**7**
Q	(China) S Peng	4	5
(Russia) V Zvonareva	1	4
WC	(Australia) **S Stosur**	**6**	**6**
(Serbia) **J Janković**	**6**	4	**6**
5	(Switzerland) M Hingis	4	**6**	3
WC	(Australia) C Dellacqua	3	4
(Serbia) **A Ivanovic**	**6**	**6**
Q	(Ukraine) **Y Fedak**	**7^{7}**	**6**
(France) M Bartoli	6^{2}	2
(Slovakia) D Hantuchová	1	4
8	(Czech Republic) **N Vaidišová**	**6**	**6**

Second round
1	(France) **A Mauresmo**	6^{4}	**7**	**6**
(France) T Golovin	**7^{7}**	5	1
WC	(Australia) S Stosur	2	6^{2}
(Serbia) **J Janković**	**6**	**7^{7}**
4	(Russia) N Petrova	2	2	r
(Serbia) **A Ivanovic**	**6**	4
Q	(Ukraine) Y Fedak	3	1
8	(Czech Republic) **N Vaidišová**	**6**	**6**

Quarterfinals
1	(France) A Mauresmo	5	0
(Serbia) **J Janković**	**7**	**6**
(Serbia) A Ivanovic	4	2
8	(Czech Republic) **N Vaidišová**	**6**	**6**

Semifinals
(Serbia) **J Janković**	**6**	4	**6**
8	(Czech Republic) N Vaidišová	4	**6**	4

==== Bottom half ====
First round
7	(Switzerland) **P Schnyder**	**6**	4	**6**
Q	(Russia) V Dushevina	3	**6**	3
(Germany) A-L Grönefeld	4	2
(Israel) **S Pe'er**	**6**	**6**
(Russia) D Safina	**6**	3	2
WC	(Australia) **N Pratt**	4	**6**	**6**
6	(Russia) **E Dementieva**	6^{3}	**7^{7}**	**6**
Q	(Japan) A Sugiyama	**7^{7}**	6^{3}	0
(Italy) F Schiavone	4	5
(China) **N Li**	**6**	**7**
(Slovenia) **K Srebotnik**	**6**	**6**
(Russia) E Bovina	3	1

Second round
7	(Switzerland) P Schnyder	6^{3}	2
(Israel) **S Pe'er**	**7**	**6**
WC	(Australia) N Pratt	1	2
3	(Belgium) **K Clijsters**	**6**	**6**
6	(Russia) E Dementieva	**6**	1	5
(China) **N Li**	3	**6**	**7**
(Slovenia) **K Srebotnik**	**6**
2	(Russia) S Kuznetsova	2	r

Quarterfinals
(Israel) S Pe'er	2	1
3	(Belgium) **K Clijsters**	**6**	**6**
(China) **N Li**	**7**	**6**
(Slovenia) K Srebotnik	5	1

Semifinals
3	(Belgium) **K Clijsters**	**6**	1	**7**
(China) N Li	1	**6**	5

==== Notes ====
- The winner received $88,265 and 275 ranking points.
- The runner-up received $47,125 and 190 ranking points.
- The last direct acceptance was Vera Zvonareva (ranked 24th).
- The Players' Representative was Francesca Schiavone.
