= 2009 Medibank International Sydney – Women's singles =

Women's singles
- 2009 Medibank International Sydney

Final
- Champion: (Russia) Elena Dementieva
- Runner-up: (Russia) Dinara Safina
- Score: 6–3, 2–6, 6–1

Details
- Draw: 32
- Seeds: 8

Events
Singles	men	women
Doubles	men	women
- Sydney International

Justine Henin was the defending champion, but retired from the sport on 14 May 2008.

Elena Dementieva won the all-Russian final, 6–3, 2–6, 6–1, over Dinara Safina.

World No. 2 and the first seed Serena Williams was nearly out of the tournament two times. Williams saved four match points in her first round clash against Samantha Stosur.and three more against Caroline Wozniacki in the quarterfinals..Williams was defeated by the eventual champion Dementieva in the semifinals in straight sets.

== Seeds ==
1. (United States) Serena Williams (semifinals)
2. (Russia) Dinara Safina (final)
3. (Russia) Elena Dementieva (champion)
4. (Russia) Vera Zvonareva (withdrew due to gastrointestinal illness)
5. (Russia) Svetlana Kuznetsova (quarterfinals, withdrew due to an abdominal strain)
6. (Poland) Agnieszka Radwańska (quarterfinals)
7. (Russia) Nadia Petrova (first round)
8. (Denmark) Caroline Wozniacki (quarterfinals)

== Draw ==
Key

- Q = Qualifier
- WC = Wild card
- LL = Lucky loser
- Alt = Alternate
- ITF = ITF entry
- PR = Protected ranking
- SR = Special ranking
- SE = Special exempt
- JE = Junior exempt
- JR = Junior Accelerator Programme entrant
- CO = College Accelerator Programme entrant
- NG = Next Gen Accelerator Program entrant
- w/o = Walkover
- r = Retired
- d = Defaulted

=== Finals ===
Semifinals
1	(United States) Serena Williams	3	1
3	(Russia) Elena Dementieva	6	6
(Japan) Ai Sugiyama	4	6^{3}
2	(Russia) Dinara Safina	6	7

Final
3	(Russia) Elena Dementieva	6	2	6
2	(Russia) Dinara Safina	3	6	1

=== Top half ===
First round
1	(United States) S Williams	6	6^{4}	7
(Australia) S Stosur	3	7	5
(Italy) S Errani	6	6
(Australia) C Dellacqua	1	2
(France) M Bartoli	1	r
Q	(United Kingdom) M South	1
(Slovakia) D Cibulková	1	2
8	(Denmark) C Wozniacki	6	6
3	(Russia) E Dementieva	7	6
(Russia) E Makarova	5	1
LL	(Italy) K Knapp	4	2
WC	(Slovakia) J Gajdošová	6	6
Q	(Czech Republic) K Zakopalová	3	0
(Slovakia) D Hantuchová	6	6
(Austria) S Bammer	4	3
6	(Poland) A Radwańska	6	6

Second round
1	(United States) S Williams	6	6
(Italy) S Errani	1	2
Q	(United Kingdom) M South	2	0
8	(Denmark) C Wozniacki	6	6
3	(Russia) E Dementieva	6	6
WC	(Slovakia) J Gajdošová	2	4
(Slovakia) D Hantuchová	3	5
6	(Poland) A Radwańska	6	7

Quarterfinals
1	(United States) S Williams	6^{5}	6	7
8	(Denmark) C Wozniacki	7	3	6^{3}
3	(Russia) E Dementieva	6	5	6
6	(Poland) A Radwańska	2	7	4

Semifinals
1	(United States) S Williams	3	1
3	(Russia) E Dementieva	6	6

=== Bottom half ===
First round
5	(Russia) S Kuznetsova	3	6	6
(China) S Peng	6	1	3
(Estonia) K Kanepi	6	7
Q	(Germany) A Kerber	1	5
LL	(United States) J Craybas	2	3
(Japan) A Sugiyama	6	6
(Spain) A Medina Garrigues	6	3	6
LL	(Belarus) A Yakimova	1	6	3
7	(Russia) N Petrova	2	4
(France) A Cornet	6	6
(Russia) M Kirilenko	2	2
(Russia) A Kleybanova	6	6
WC	(Australia) E Starr	0	1
Q	(Russia) V Dushevina	6	6
(Romania) S Cîrstea	2	1
2	(Russia) D Safina	6	6

Second round
5	(Russia) S Kuznetsova	6	2	7
(Estonia) K Kanepi	2	6	6^{3}
(Japan) A Sugiyama	2	6	6
(Spain) A Medina Garrigues	6	1	2
(France) A Cornet	7	6
(Russia) A Kleybanova	6^{5}	1
Q	(Russia) V Dushevina	3	0
2	(Russia) D Safina	6	6

Quarterfinals
5	(Russia) S Kuznetsova
(Japan) A Sugiyama	w/o
(France) A Cornet	3	4
2	(Russia) D Safina	6	6

Semifinals
(Japan) A Sugiyama	4	6^{3}
2	(Russia) D Safina	6	7
