= 2007 Medibank International – Women's doubles =

Women's doubles
- 2007 Medibank International

Final
- Champions: (Germany) Anna-Lena Grönefeld (United States) Meghann Shaughnessy
- Runners-up: (France) Marion Bartoli (United States) Meilen Tu
- Score: 6–3, 3–6, 7–6^{(7–2)}

Events
Singles	men	women
Doubles	men	women
← 2006 ·	Sydney International	· 2008 →

Yan Zi and Zheng Jie were the defending champions, but DAB together this year.

== Seeds ==
1. (United States) Lisa Raymond
  (Australia) Samantha Stosur (first round)
2. (Zimbabwe) Cara Black
  (South Africa) Liezel Huber (semifinals)
3. (Slovakia) Daniela Hantuchová
  (Japan) Ai Sugiyama (quarterfinals)
4. (Germany) Anna-Lena Grönefeld
  (United States) Meghann Shaughnessy (champions)

== Draw ==
=== Key ===
- Q = Qualifier
- WC = Wild card
- LL = Lucky loser
- Alt = Alternate
- SE = Special exempt
- PR = Protected ranking
- ITF = ITF entry
- JE = Junior exempt
- w/o = Walkover
- r = Retired
- d = Defaulted
- SR = Special ranking

=== Draw ===
First round
1	(United States) L Raymond (Australia) S Stosur	4	5
(France) É Loit (Australia) N Pratt	6	7
(Greece) E Daniilidou (Germany) J Wöhr	2	6	5
(United States) C Morariu (Australia) R Stubbs	6	4	7
4	(Germany) A-L Grönefeld (United States) M Shaughnessy	7	7^{7}
(United States) J Craybas (China) T Li	5	6^{2}
(Russia) E Bovina (Italy) F Schiavone	4	1
(Russia) V Dushevina (Ukraine) Y Fedak	6	6
(Slovakia) J Husárová (Russia) G Voskoboeva	7^{7}	6^{5}	2
(France) M Bartoli (United States) M Tu	6^{3}	7^{7}	6
WC	(Serbia) J Janković (China) N Li	0	2
3	(Slovakia) D Hantuchová (Japan) A Sugiyama	6	6
(France) N Dechy (Russia) V Zvonareva	4	1
(United States) V King (China) T Sun	6	6
WC	(Australia) M Adamczak (Australia) C Dellacqua	3	6^{3}
2	(Zimbabwe) C Black (South Africa) L Huber	6	7^{7}

Quarterfinals
(France) É Loit (Australia) N Pratt	6^{5}	6	6
(United States) C Morariu (Australia) R Stubbs	7^{7}	2	3
4	(Germany) A-L Grönefeld (United States) M Shaughnessy	1	6	6
(Russia) V Dushevina (Ukraine) Y Fedak	6	3	2
(France) M Bartoli (United States) M Tu	w/o
3	(Slovakia) D Hantuchová (Japan) A Sugiyama
(United States) V King (China) T Sun	4	3
2	(Zimbabwe) C Black (South Africa) L Huber	6	6

Semifinals
(France) É Loit (Australia) N Pratt	3	2
4	(Germany) A-L Grönefeld (United States) M Shaughnessy	6	6
(France) M Bartoli (United States) M Tu	6	6
2	(Zimbabwe) C Black (South Africa) L Huber	4	2

Final
4	(Germany) A-L Grönefeld (United States) M Shaughnessy	6	3	7^{7}
(France) M Bartoli (United States) M Tu	3	6	6^{2}
