= 2007 Medibank International – Men's doubles =

Men's doubles
- 2007 Medibank International

Final
- Champions: (Australia) Paul Hanley (Zimbabwe) Kevin Ullyett
- Runners-up: (The Bahamas) Mark Knowles (Canada) Daniel Nestor
- Score: 6–4, 6–7^{(3–7)}, [10–6]

Events
Singles	men	women
Doubles	men	women
← 2006 ·	Sydney International	· 2008 →

The 2007 Medibank International men's doubles was the 2007 Medibank International men's doubles competition won by Paul Hanley and Kevin Ullyett.

== Seeds ==
1. (United States) Bob Bryan / (United States) Mike Bryan (first round)
2. (The Bahamas) Mark Knowles / (Canada) Daniel Nestor (final)
3. (Australia) Paul Hanley / (Zimbabwe) Kevin Ullyett (champions)
4. (Czech Republic) Martin Damm / (India) Leander Paes (semifinals)

== Draw ==
=== Key ===
- Q = Qualifier
- WC = Wild card
- LL = Lucky loser
- Alt = Alternate
- ITF = ITF entry
- PR = Protected ranking
- SR = Special ranking
- SE = Special exempt
- JE = Junior exempt
- JR = Junior Accelerator Programme entrant
- CO = College Accelerator Programme entrant
- NG = Next Gen Accelerator Program entrant
- w/o = Walkover
- r = Retired
- d = Defaulted

=== Draw ===
First round
1	(United States) B Bryan (United States) M Bryan	6	6^{5}	[5]
(France) A Clément (France) M Llodra	4	7^{7}	[10]
(Poland) M Fyrstenberg (Poland) M Matkowski	4	6	[10]
(Australia) S Huss (Australia) T Perry	6	3	[6]
3	(Australia) P Hanley (Zimbabwe) K Ullyett	6	6
(France) J Benneteau (Austria) J Knowle	4	3
(Israel) J Erlich (Israel) A Ram	4	3
(India) M Bhupathi (France) F Santoro	6	6
WC	(Australia) A Jones (Australia) R Smeets	4	2
(Australia) A Fisher (United States) T Phillips	6	6
(Czech Republic) L Dlouhý (Czech Republic) P Vízner	6^{2}	2
4	(Czech Republic) M Damm (India) L Paes	7^{7}	6
(United States) P Goldstein (United States) J Thomas	6	7^{7}
WC	(Australia) L Bourgeois (Australia) J Kerr	4	6^{4}
(Czech Republic) F Čermák (Czech Republic) J Levinský	7^{7}	3	[6]
2	(The Bahamas) M Knowles (Canada) D Nestor	6^{5}	6	[10]

Quarterfinals
(France) A Clément (France) M Llodra	7^{7}	2	[9]
(Poland) M Fyrstenberg (Poland) M Matkowski	6^{5}	6	[11]
4	(Australia) P Hanley (Zimbabwe) K Ullyett	6	7^{8}
(India) M Bhupathi (France) F Santoro	1	6^{6}
(Australia) A Fisher (United States) T Phillips	2	7	[5]
4	(Czech Republic) M Damm (India) L Paes	6	5	[10]
(United States) P Goldstein (United States) J Thomas	4	1
2	(The Bahamas) M Knowles (Canada) D Nestor	6	6

Semifinals
(Poland) M Fyrstenberg (Poland) M Matkowski	2	6^{4}
4	(Zimbabwe) K Ullyett (Australia) P Hanley	6	7^{7}
4	(Czech Republic) M Damm (India) L Paes	2	3
2	(The Bahamas) M Knowles (Canada) D Nestor	6	6

Final
3	(Zimbabwe) K Ullyett (Australia) P Hanley	6	6^{3}	[10]
2	(The Bahamas) M Knowles (Canada) D Nestor	4	7^{7}	[6]
