= 2007 Medibank International =

- Date: 7–13 January 2007
- Edition: 115th
- Surface: Hard / outdoor
- Location: Sydney, Australia

Champions

Men's singles
- (United States) James Blake

Women's singles
- (Belgium) Kim Clijsters

Men's doubles
- (Australia) Paul Hanley / (Zimbabwe) Kevin Ullyett

Women's doubles
- (Germany) Anna-Lena Grönefeld / (United States) Meghann Shaughnessy
- Medibank International

The 2007 Medibank International was a combined men's and women's tennis tournament that was part of the 2007 ATP Tour and 2007 WTA Tour. It was the 115th edition of the annually-held Medibank International and was played on outdoor hard courts in Sydney, Australia from 7 to 13 January 2007.

The event was notable as being the last tournament Kim Clijsters won, before her first retirement from the sport. James Blake defended his title from the previous year.

== Finals ==
=== Men's singles ===
(United States) James Blake defeated (Spain) Carlos Moyá, 6–3, 5–7, 6–1

=== Women's singles ===
(Belgium) Kim Clijsters defeated (Serbia) Jelena Janković, 4–6, 7–6^{(7–1)}, 6–4

=== Men's doubles ===
(Australia) Paul Hanley / (Zimbabwe) Kevin Ullyett defeated (The Bahamas) Mark Knowles / (Canada) Daniel Nestor, 6–4, 6–7^{(3–7)}, [10–6]

=== Women's doubles ===
(Germany) Anna-Lena Grönefeld / (United States) Meghann Shaughnessy defeated (France) Marion Bartoli / (United States) Meilen Tu, 6–3, 3–6, 7–6
