= 2008 Medibank International – Women's singles =

Women's singles
- 2008 Medibank International

Final
- Champion: (Belgium) Justine Henin
- Runner-up: (Russia) Svetlana Kuznetsova
- Score: 4–6, 6–2, 6–4

Details
- Draw: 28
- Seeds: 8

Events
Singles	men	women
Doubles	men	women
- Sydney International

Kim Clijsters was the defending champion, but retired from the sport on 6 May 2007.

Justine Henin won in the final 4–6, 6–2, 6–4, against Svetlana Kuznetsova.

== Seeds ==
The top four seeds receive a bye into the second round.

1. (Belgium) Justine Henin (champion)
2. (Russia) Svetlana Kuznetsova (final)
3. (Serbia) Jelena Janković (quarterfinals)
4. (Serbia) Ana Ivanovic (semifinals)
5. (Russia) Anna Chakvetadze (first round)
6. (Slovakia) Daniela Hantuchová (second round)
7. (France) Marion Bartoli (second round)
8. (Russia) Elena Dementieva (first round)

== Draw ==
Key

- Q = Qualifier
- WC = Wild card
- LL = Lucky loser
- Alt = Alternate
- ITF = ITF entry
- PR = Protected ranking
- SR = Special ranking
- SE = Special exempt
- JE = Junior exempt
- JR = Junior Accelerator Programme entrant
- CO = College Accelerator Programme entrant
- NG = Next Gen Accelerator Program entrant
- w/o = Walkover
- r = Retired
- d = Defaulted

=== Finals ===
Semifinals
1	(Belgium) Justine Henin	6	2	6
4	(Serbia) Ana Ivanovic	2	6	4
(Czech Republic) Nicole Vaidišová	5	6^{4}
2	(Russia) Svetlana Kuznetsova	7	7

Final
1	(Belgium) Justine Henin	4	6	6
2	(Russia) Svetlana Kuznetsova	6	2	4

=== Top half ===
First round
WC	(Australia) A Molik	6^{2}	6^{10}
(Czech Republic) L Šafářová	7	7
Q	(Slovakia) D Cibulková	6	1	6^{6}
Q	(Estonia) K Kanepi	3	6	7
Q	(Sweden) S Arvidsson	6	7
8	(Russia) E Dementieva	1	5
WC	(Australia) N Pratt	2	1
(France) V Razzano	6	6
(Austria) S Bammer	7	6
WC	(Russia) N Petrova	5	3
(Slovenia) K Srebotnik	7	6
5	(Russia) A Chakvetadze	5	1

Second round
1	(Belgium) J Henin	w/o
(Czech Republic) L Šafářová
Q	(Estonia) K Kanepi	3	6	6
Q	(Sweden) S Arvidsson	6	3	3
4	(Serbia) A Ivanovic	6	2	7
(France) V Razzano	1	6	5
(Austria) S Bammer	6	1	2
(Slovenia) K Srebotnik	4	6	6

Quarterfinals
1	(Belgium) J Henin	6	6
Q	(Estonia) K Kanepi	2	0
4	(Serbia) A Ivanovic	6	3	6
(Slovenia) K Srebotnik	3	6	3

Semifinals
1	(Belgium) J Henin	6	2	6
4	(Serbia) A Ivanovic	2	6	4

=== Bottom half ===
First round
6	(Slovakia) D Hantuchová	5	6	6
(Russia) D Safina	7	4	4
(Czech Republic) N Vaidišová	6	2	6
Q	(France) C Pin	1	6	2
LL	(Israel) T Obziler	2	3
(France) T Golovin	6	6
7	(France) M Bartoli	6	6
LL	(Italy) K Knapp	1	0
(Italy) F Schiavone	6	6
Q	(United States) J Craybas	4	4
(Israel) S Pe'er	6	6
Q	(Ukraine) Y Fedak	3	2

Second round
6	(Slovakia) D Hantuchová	4	2
(Czech Republic) N Vaidišová	6	6
(France) T Golovin	1	6	3
3	(Serbia) J Janković	6	2	6
7	(France) M Bartoli	6	3	2
(Italy) F Schiavone	2	6	6
(Israel) S Pe'er	3	4
2	(Russia) S Kuznetsova	6	6

Quarterfinals
(Czech Republic) N Vaidišová	6	4	6
3	(Serbia) J Janković	4	6	4
(Italy) F Schiavone	4	0
2	(Russia) S Kuznetsova	6	6

Semifinals
(Czech Republic) N Vaidišová	5	6^{4}
2	(Russia) S Kuznetsova	7	7
