= 2007 Medibank International – Men's singles =

Men's singles
- 2007 Medibank International

Final
- Champion: (United States) James Blake
- Runner-up: (Spain) Carlos Moyá
- Score: 6–3, 5–7, 6–1

Details
- Draw: 32
- Seeds: 8

Events
Singles	men	women
Doubles	men	women
- Sydney International

James Blake defeated Carlos Moyá 6–3, 5–7, 6–1 to win the 2007 Medibank International singles event. Blake made it to the finals in a walkover when Juergen Melzer was forced to pull out with a stomach virus. It was Blake's sixth title in the last 12 months.

== Seeds ==
1. (Spain) Rafael Nadal (first round, retired because of a thigh injury)
2. (Russia) Nikolay Davydenko (second round, retired because of a leg injury)
3. (United States) James Blake (champion)
4. (Cyprus) Marcos Baghdatis (quarterfinals)
5. (Czech Republic) Tomáš Berdych (quarterfinals)
6. (France) Richard Gasquet (semifinals)
7. (Russia) ~~Dmitry Tursunov~~ (withdrew because of a wrist injury)
8. (France) Sébastien Grosjean (first round)

== Draws ==
=== Key ===
- Q = Qualifier
- WC = Wild card
- r = Retired
- w/o = Walkover
- LL = Lucky loser
- S = Special exempt

=== Finals ===
Semifinals					Finals
	(Austria) J Melzer
3	(United States) J Blake	w/o			3	(United States) J Blake	6	5	6
	(Spain) C Moyá	6	4	6		(Spain) C Moyá	3	7	1
6	(France) R Gasquet	3	6	2

=== Section 1 ===
First round
1	(Spain) R Nadal	5^{r}
(Australia) C Guccione	6
(Austria) J Melzer	6	2	6
(France) F Santoro	2	6	4
Q	(Czech Republic) I Minář	6	3
(Thailand) P Srichaphan	2	0^{r}
Q	(Australia) R Smeets	2	5
5	(Czech Republic) T Berdych	6	7
3	(United States) J Blake	6	6
LL	(United States) K Kim	3	4
S	(Austria) S Koubek	3	5
WC	(Australia) N Healey	6	7
(United States) R Ginepri	6	6
(Germany) F Mayer	3	2
(South Korea) Lee HT	7	3	2
LL	(Russia) E Korolev	6^{2}	6	6

Second round
(Australia) C Guccione	6^{3}	3
(Austria) J Melzer	7	6
Q	(Czech Republic) I Minář	7	0	4
5	(Czech Republic) Tomáš Berdych	6^{4}	6	6
3	(United States) J Blake	6	6
(Australia) N Healey	2	4
(United States) R Ginepri	6	4	4
LL	(Russia) E Korolev	0	6	6

Quarterfinals
(Austria) J Melzer	6	6
5	(Czech Republic) T Berdych	2	4
3	(United States) J Blake	6	6
LL	(Russia) E Korolev	1	4

Semifinals
(Austria) J Melzer
3	(United States) J Blake	w/o

=== Section 2 ===
First round
8	(France) S Grosjean	4	4
(Spain) F Verdasco	6	6
(Spain) C Moyá	7	4	7
WC	(Australia) L Bourgeois	6^{4}	6	6^{6}
LL	(Italy) A Seppi	4	2
Q	(Czech Republic) J Hernych	6	6
Q	(Latvia) E Gulbis	6^{3}	1
4	(Cyprus) M Baghdatis	7	6
6	(France) R Gasquet	6	6
(France) J Benneteau	1	4
(Germany) B Becker	6	6
(Italy) F Volandri	3	2
(France) A Clément	6^{5}	4
(France) PH Mathieu	7	6
S	(United States) V Spadea	6	3	4
2	(Russia) N Davydenko	3	6	6

Second round
(Spain) F Verdasco	6	6^{9}	3
(Spain) C Moyá	4	7	6
Q	(Czech Republic) J Hernych	4	7	3
4	(Cyprus) M Baghdatis	6	6^{2}	6
6	(France) R Gasquet	6	6
(Germany) B Becker	3	4
(France) PH Mathieu	6
2	(Russia) N Davydenko	4	r

Quarterfinals
(Spain) C Moyá	6	3	7
4	(Cyprus) M Baghdatis	1	6	6^{3}
6	(France) R Gasquet	6	6^{1}	6
(France) PH Mathieu	4	7	0

Semifinals
(Spain) C Moyá	6	4	6
6	(France) R Gasquet	3	6	2
