= 2008 Medibank International =

- Date: 6–12 January
- Edition: 116th
- Location: Sydney, Australia
- Venue: NSW Tennis Centre

Champions

Men's singles
- (Russia) Dmitry Tursunov

Women's singles
- (Belgium) Justine Henin

Men's doubles
- (France) Richard Gasquet / (France) Jo-Wilfried Tsonga

Women's doubles
- (China) Zi Yan / (China) Jie Zheng
- Medibank International

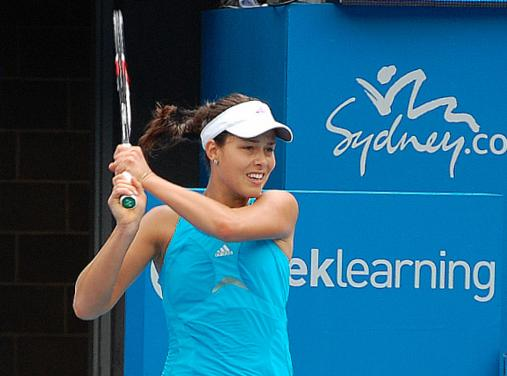
Women's singles semifinalist Ana Ivanovic

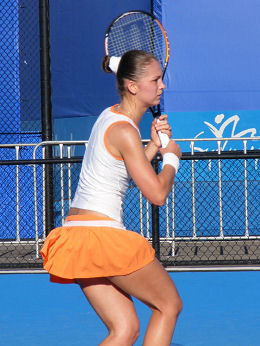
Women's doubles runner-up Tatiana Perebiynis

The 2008 Medibank International was a tennis tournament played on outdoor hard courts. It was the 116th edition of the event known that year as the Medibank International, and was part of the International Series of the 2008 ATP Tour, and of the Tier II Series of the 2008 WTA Tour. Both the men's and the women's events took place at the NSW Tennis Centre in Sydney, Australia, from 6 through 12 January 2008.

The men's draw was led by ATP No. 8 and 2007 Mumbai champion Richard Gasquet, 2007 Metz winner Tommy Robredo, and defending champion and recent 2007 Davis Cup titlist James Blake. Other top seeds competing were 2007 Tokyo semifinalist Tomáš Berdych, Chennai semifinalist Carlos Moyá, Lleyton Hewitt, Paul-Henri Mathieu and Fernando Verdasco.

The women's field featured World No. 1 and 2007 WTA Tour Championships titlist Justine Henin, WTA No. 2 and 2007 U.S. Open runner-up Svetlana Kuznetsova, and WTA No. 3 and Beijing finalist Jelena Janković. Also present were 2007 Luxembourg Tier II champion Ana Ivanovic, 2007 U.S. Open semifinalist Anna Chakvetadze, Daniela Hantuchová, Marion Bartoli and Elena Dementieva.

== Finals ==
=== Men's singles ===
(Russia) Dmitry Tursunov defeated (Australia) Chris Guccione, 7–6^{(7–3)}, 7–6^{(7–4)}

- It was Dmitry Tursunov's 1st title of the year, and his 4th overall.

=== Women's singles ===
(Belgium) Justine Henin defeated (Russia) Svetlana Kuznetsova, 4–6, 6–2, 6–4

- It was Justine Henin's 1st title of the year, and her 40th overall.

=== Men's doubles ===
(France) Richard Gasquet / (France) Jo-Wilfried Tsonga defeated (United States) Bob Bryan / (United States) Mike Bryan, 4–6, 6–4, [11–9]

=== Women's doubles ===
(China) Zi Yan / (China) Jie Zheng defeated (Ukraine) Tatiana Perebiynis / (Belarus) Tatiana Poutchek, 6–4, 7–6^{(7–5)}
