= 2003 RCA Championships – Singles =

Singles
- 2003 RCA Championships

Final
- Champion: (United States) Andy Roddick
- Runner-up: (Thailand) Paradorn Srichaphan
- Score: 7–6^{(7–2)}, 6–4

Details
- Draw: 48 (6 Q / 4 WC )
- Seeds: 16

Events
Singles	Doubles
← 2002 ·	Indianapolis Tennis Championships	· 2004 →

Greg Rusedski was the defending champion but lost in the second round to Scott Draper.

Andy Roddick won in the final 7–6^{(7–2)}, 6–4 against Paradorn Srichaphan.

== Seeds ==
All sixteen seeds received a bye to the second round.

1. (United States) Andy Roddick (champion)
2. (Thailand) Paradorn Srichaphan (final)
3. (Netherlands) Sjeng Schalken (semifinals)
4. (Russia) Yevgeny Kafelnikov (third round)
5. (United States) Jan-Michael Gambill (third round)
6. (United States) Mardy Fish (third round)
7. (United States) Robby Ginepri (quarterfinals)
8. (South Korea) Hyung-Taik Lee (second round)
9. (Belgium) Xavier Malisse (quarterfinals)
10. (United Kingdom) Greg Rusedski (second round)
11. (Croatia) Mario Ančić (second round)
12. (United States) Brian Vahaly (second round)
13. (Germany) Lars Burgsmüller (third round)
14. (Germany) Nicolas Kiefer (quarterfinals)
15. (Denmark) Kenneth Carlsen (second round)
16. (United States) Justin Gimelstob (second round)

== Draw ==
=== Key ===
- Q = Qualifier
- WC = Wild card
- LL = Lucky loser
- Alt = Alternate
- SE = Special exempt
- PR = Protected ranking
- ITF = ITF entry
- JE = Junior exempt
- w/o = Walkover
- r = Retired
- d = Defaulted
- SR = Special ranking

=== Finals ===
Semifinals
1	(United States) Andy Roddick	6	6
3	(Netherlands) Sjeng Schalken	3	2
(France) Nicolas Thomann	6	6^{5}	3
2	(Thailand) Paradorn Srichaphan	4	7^{7}	6

Final
1	(United States) Andy Roddick	7^{7}	6
2	(Thailand) Paradorn Srichaphan	6^{2}	4

=== Top half ===
==== Section 1 ====
First round
(France) C Saulnier	6	6
Q	(United States) M Behrmann	0	3
(France) G Carraz	4	6	6
(Israel) N Okun	6	3	4
WC	(United States) R Ram	6	6
LL	(Russia) I Levine	1	3
(Sweden) T Enqvist	7^{7}	3	6
(Czech Republic) J Vacek	6^{5}	6	3

Second round
1	(United States) A Roddick	6^{5}	6	7^{7}
(France) C Saulnier	7^{7}	3	6^{4}
(France) G Carraz	6	3	7^{7}
15	(Denmark) K Carlsen	4	6	6^{5}
9	(Belgium) X Malisse	6	6
WC	(United States) R Ram	2	4
(Sweden) T Enqvist	2	2
5	(United States) J-M Gambill	6	6

Third round
1	(United States) A Roddick	6	6
(France) G Carraz	3	4
9	(Belgium) X Malisse	6	6
5	(United States) J-M Gambill	4	2

Quarterfinals
1	(United States) A Roddick	6	6
9	(Belgium) X Malisse	4	1

==== Section 2 ====
First round
Q	(France) J Benneteau	1	0
(Peru) I Miranda	6	6
(United States) E Taino	3	6	7
(United States) M Chang	6	3	5
(Switzerland) I Heuberger	6	6
(Israel) H Levy	1	1
Q	(Israel) A Ram	1	6	4
(Australia) P Luczak	6	3	6

Second round
3	(Netherlands) S Schalken	6	6
(Peru) I Miranda	3	1
(United States) E Taino	3	4
13	(Germany) L Burgsmüller	6	6
11	(Croatia) M Ančić	3	6	5
(Switzerland) I Heuberger	6	2	7
(Australia) P Luczak	3	3
7	(United States) R Ginepri	6	6

Third round
3	(Netherlands) S Schalken	6	6
13	(Germany) L Burgsmüller	4	2
(Switzerland) I Heuberger	1	3
7	(United States) R Ginepri	6	6

Quarterfinals
3	(Netherlands) S Schalken	1	6	6
7	(United States) R Ginepri	6	1	2

=== Bottom half ===
==== Section 3 ====
First round
(France) N Thomann	6	6
Q	(United States) D Ayala	4	4
(Paraguay) R Delgado	4	6	4
(South Africa) W Moodie	6	2	6
Q	(India) P Amritraj	6	3	7
(Argentina) S Roitman	3	6	5
Q	(Serbia and Montenegro) N Zimonjić	6^{5}	4
(Serbia and Montenegro) J Tipsarević	7^{7}	6

Second round
8	(South Korea) H-T Lee	4	5
(France) N Thomann	6	7
(South Africa) W Moodie	6	4	7^{7}
12	(United States) B Vahaly	3	6	6^{1}
14	(Germany) N Kiefer	6	6
Q	(India) P Amritraj	3	1
(Serbia and Montenegro) J Tipsarević	5	3
4	(Russia) Y Kafelnikov	7	6

Third round
(France) N Thomann	6	6
(South Africa) W Moodie	3	4
14	(Germany) N Kiefer	6	6
4	(Russia) Y Kafelnikov	3	4

Quarterfinals
(France) N Thomann	7^{7}	7
14	(Germany) N Kiefer	6^{2}	4

==== Section 4 ====
First round
(United States) C Mamiit	1	3
WC	(Australia) C Guccione	6	6
(Australia) S Draper	7	6
WC	(United States) B Reynolds	5	3
(United States) A Kim	3	6	4
(United States) A Bogomolov Jr.	6	1	6
(Brazil) R Mello	7^{7}	4	5
WC	(United States) A Delić	6^{3}	6	7

Second round
6	(United States) M Fish	7	6^{5}	6
WC	(Australia) C Guccione	5	7^{7}	4
(Australia) S Draper	3	7^{7}	7^{7}
10	(United Kingdom) G Rusedski	6	6^{4}	6^{4}
16	(United States) J Gimelstob	2	4
(United States) A Bogomolov Jr.	6	6
WC	(United States) A Delić	7^{7}	6^{3}	1
2	(Thailand) P Srichaphan	6^{5}	7^{7}	6

Third round
6	(United States) M Fish	6	6^{3}	3
(Australia) S Draper	3	7^{7}	6
(United States) A Bogomolov Jr.	4	3
2	(Thailand) P Srichaphan	6	6

Quarterfinals
(Australia) S Draper	4	2
2	(Thailand) P Srichaphan	6	6
