= 2004 RCA Championships – Doubles =

Doubles
- 2004 RCA Championships

Final
- Champions: (Australia) Jordan Kerr (United States) Jim Thomas
- Runners-up: (Zimbabwe) Wayne Black (Zimbabwe) Kevin Ullyett
- Score: 6–7^{(7–9)}, 7–6^{(7–3)}, 6–3

Events
Singles	Doubles
← 2003 ·	Indianapolis Tennis Championships	· 2005 →

Mario Ančić and Andy Ram were the defending champions, but Ančić did not participate this year. Ram partnered Jonathan Erlich, losing in the quarterfinals.

Jordan Kerr and Jim Thomas won the title, defeating Wayne Black and Kevin Ullyett 6–7^{(7–9)}, 7–6^{(7–3)}, 6–3 in the final.

== Seeds ==
1. (Belarus) Max Mirnyi / (France) Fabrice Santoro (quarterfinals)
2. (Zimbabwe) Wayne Black / (Zimbabwe) Kevin Ullyett (final)
3. (Australia) Wayne Arthurs / (Australia) Paul Hanley (semifinals)
4. (Israel) Jonathan Erlich / (Israel) Andy Ram (quarterfinals)

== Draw ==
=== Key ===
- Q = Qualifier
- WC = Wild card
- LL = Lucky loser
- Alt = Alternate
- SE = Special exempt
- PR = Protected ranking
- ITF = ITF entry
- JE = Junior exempt
- w/o = Walkover
- r = Retired
- d = Defaulted
- SR = Special ranking

=== Draw ===
First round
1	(Belarus) M Mirnyi (France) F Santoro	6^{8}	6	6
WC	(United States) A Bogomolov Jr. (United States) T Dent	7^{10}	4	4
(Australia) J Kerr (United States) J Thomas	7^{7}	3	6
(United States) R Leach (United States) B MacPhie	6^{2}	6	3
3	(Australia) W Arthurs (Australia) P Hanley	5	7^{7}	7
(United States) R Ginepri (The Bahamas) M Merklein	7	6^{5}	5
(South Africa) R Koenig (Japan) T Shimada	6^{5}	2
(Croatia) I Karlović (Croatia) I Ljubičić	7^{7}	6
(United States) T Parrott (Argentina) M Rodríguez	6	7
WC	(United States) B Baker (United States) R Ram	4	5
(France) S Grosjean (Germany) N Kiefer	7^{11}	1	2
4	(Israel) J Erlich (Israel) A Ram	6^{9}	6	6
(Slovakia) K Beck (Slovakia) D Hrbatý	3	7^{7}	3
(United States) S Humphries (United States) G Oliver	6	6^{5}	6
(Sweden) J Johansson (Sweden) R Söderling	2	6^{7}
2	(Zimbabwe) W Black (Zimbabwe) K Ullyett	6	7^{9}

Quarterfinals
1	(Belarus) M Mirnyi (France) F Santoro	6	3	4
(Australia) J Kerr (United States) J Thomas	3	6	6
3	(Australia) W Arthurs (Australia) P Hanley	w/o
(Croatia) I Karlović (Croatia) I Ljubičić
(United States) T Parrott (Argentina) M Rodríguez	5	6	7^{7}
4	(Israel) J Erlich (Israel) A Ram	7	4	6^{4}
(United States) S Humphries (United States) G Oliver	4	2
2	(Zimbabwe) W Black (Zimbabwe) K Ullyett	6	6

Semifinals
(Australia) J Kerr (United States) J Thomas	7	5	7^{7}
3	(Australia) W Arthurs (Australia) P Hanley	5	7	6^{2}
(United States) T Parrott (Argentina) M Rodríguez	3	6^{7}
2	(Zimbabwe) W Black (Zimbabwe) K Ullyett	6	7^{9}

Final
(Australia) J Kerr (United States) J Thomas	6^{7}	7^{7}	6
2	(Zimbabwe) W Black (Zimbabwe) K Ullyett	7^{9}	6^{3}	3
