= 2004 RCA Championships – Singles =

Singles
- 2004 RCA Championships

Final
- Champion: (United States) Andy Roddick
- Runner-up: (Germany) Nicolas Kiefer
- Score: 6–2, 6–3

Details
- Draw: 48 (6 Q / 3 WC )
- Seeds: 16

Events
| Singles | Doubles |
| ← 2003 · | Indianapolis Tennis Championships | · 2005 → |

Andy Roddick was the defending champion and successfully defended his title, defeating Nicolas Kiefer, 6–2, 6–3 in the final.

== Seeds ==
1. (United States) Andy Roddick (champion)
2. ~~(United States) Andre Agassi~~ (withdrew due to a scheduling conflict)
3. (France) Sébastien Grosjean (quarterfinals)
4. (Thailand) Paradorn Srichaphan (quarterfinals)
5. (United States) Mardy Fish (second round)
6. (Slovakia) Dominik Hrbatý (quarterfinals)
7. (Netherlands) Sjeng Schalken (second round)
8. ~~(United States) Vincent Spadea~~ (withdrew due to a back injury)
9. ~~(United States) Taylor Dent~~ (withdrew due to a virus)
10. (Croatia) Ivan Ljubičić (semifinals)
11. (Sweden) Joachim Johansson (third round)
12. (Germany) Nicolas Kiefer (final)
13. (Belarus) Max Mirnyi (second round)
14. (Belgium) Xavier Malisse (third round)
15. (United States) Robby Ginepri (third round)
16. (Sweden) Robin Söderling (second round)
17. (Sweden) Thomas Enqvist (second round)

== Draw ==
=== Key ===
- Q = Qualifier
- WC = Wild card
- LL = Lucky loser
- Alt = Alternate
- SE = Special exempt
- PR = Protected ranking
- ITF = ITF entry
- JE = Junior exempt
- w/o = Walkover
- r = Retired
- d = Defaulted
- SR = Special ranking

=== Finals ===
Semifinals
1 | (United States) Andy Roddick | 1 | 7^{12} | 7^{7}
10 | (Croatia) Ivan Ljubičić | 6 | 6^{10} | 6^{3}
12 | (Germany) Nicolas Kiefer | 6 | 6
(France) Grégory Carraz | 2 | 2

Final
1 | (United States) Andy Roddick | 6 | 6
12 | (Germany) Nicolas Kiefer | 2 | 3

=== Top half ===
==== Section 1 ====
First round
Q | (Switzerland) M Kratochvil | 6 | 5 | 6
(Czech Republic) J Vacek | 2 | 7 | 3
Q | (France) S de Chaunac | 2 | 7 | 6
(France) A Dupuis | 6 | 5 | 4
(United Kingdom) G Rusedski | 7^{7} | 6^{3} | 6
WC | (Sweden) T Johansson | 6^{5} | 7^{7} | 4
(France) F Santoro | 6 | 4 | 6
(South Korea) H-t Lee | 3 | 6 | 4

Second round
1 | (United States) A Roddick | 6 | 2 | 6
Q | (Switzerland) M Kratochvil | 4 | 6 | 4
Q | (France) S de Chaunac | 3 | 6 | 2
15 | (United States) R Ginepri | 6 | 3 | 6
11 | (Sweden) J Johansson | 6^{5} | 6 | 6
(United Kingdom) G Rusedski | 7^{7} | 3 | 4
(France) F Santoro | 3 | 2
6 | (Slovakia) D Hrbatý | 6 | 6

Third round
1 | (United States) A Roddick | 7^{7} | 6
15 | (United States) R Ginepri | 6^{5} | 4
11 | (Sweden) J Johansson | 6^{9} | 6 | 6^{1}
6 | (Slovakia) D Hrbatý | 7^{11} | 4 | 7^{7}

Quarterfinals
1 | (United States) A Roddick | 6 | 6
6 | (Slovakia) D Hrbatý | 2 | 3

==== Section 2 ====
First round
(Belgium) G Elseneer | 3 | 6 | 3
LL | (France) J Jeanpierre | 6 | 3 | 6
SE | (United States) J Morrison | 6 | 7^{8}
(France) J Benneteau | 4 | 6^{6}
WC | (United States) R Ram | 6^{3} | 6 | 7^{7}
(South Africa) W Moodie | 7^{7} | 3 | 6^{5}
LL | (Czech Republic) J Hernych | 6 | 3
(United States) J-M Gambill | 4 | 0^{r}

Second round
3 | (France) S Grosjean | 6^{6} | 6 | 6
LL | (France) J Jeanpierre | 7^{8} | 2 | 2
SE | (United States) J Morrison | 1 | 2
14 | (Belgium) X Malisse | 6 | 6
10 | (Croatia) I Ljubičić | 6 | 6
WC | (United States) R Ram | 2 | 3
LL | (Czech Republic) J Hernych | 7 | 1
7 | (Netherlands) S Schalken | 5 | 0^{r}

Third round
3 | (France) S Grosjean | 7^{7} | 6
14 | (Belgium) X Malisse | 6^{4} | 2
10 | (Croatia) I Ljubičić | 6 | 6
LL | (Czech Republic) J Hernych | 3 | 4

Quarterfinals
3 | (France) S Grosjean | 7 | 5 | 2
10 | (Croatia) I Ljubičić | 5 | 7 | 6

==== Section 3 ====
First round
(Australia) W Arthurs | 6^{6} | 1
Q | (South Africa) R de Voest | 7^{8} | 6
Q | (United States) B Vahaly | 7 | 3 | 4
(Croatia) I Karlović | 5 | 6 | 6
(Denmark) K Carlsen | 4 | 4
(United States) A Bogomolov Jr. | 6 | 6
(United States) J Salzenstein | 5 | 6^{3}
(France) T Ascione | 7 | 7^{7}

Second round
LL | (Switzerland) M Chiudinelli | 6 | 1 | 3
Q | (South Africa) R de Voest | 1 | 6 | 6
(Croatia) I Karlović | 0 | 6^{0}
12 | (Germany) N Kiefer | 6 | 7^{7}
16 | (Sweden) R Söderling | 2 | 2
(United States) A Bogomolov Jr. | 6 | 6
(France) T Ascione | 6^{4} | 1
4 | (Thailand) P Srichaphan | 7^{7} | 6

Third round
Q | (South Africa) R de Voest | 1 | 5
12 | (Germany) N Kiefer | 6 | 7
(United States) A Bogomolov Jr. | 3 | 0
4 | (Thailand) P Srichaphan | 6 | 6

Quarterfinals
12 | (Germany) N Kiefer | 7^{9} | 7^{7}
4 | (Thailand) P Srichaphan | 6^{7} | 6^{5}

==== Section 4 ====
First round
(Armenia) S Sargsian | 3 | 3
(France) G Carraz | 6 | 6
Q | (Australia) T Reid | 4 | 6 | 3
(France) M Llodra | 6 | 3 | 0^{r}
WC | (United States) A Delić | 1 | 6 | 1
(Slovakia) K Beck | 6 | 3 | 6
Q | (Israel) N Okun | 6 | 6
(Chinese Taipei) Y-h Lu | 3 | 1

Second round
5 | (United States) M Fish | 6^{4} | 6^{4}
(France) G Carraz | 7^{7} | 7^{7}
Q | (Australia) T Reid | 6 | 7
LL | (United States) A Kuznetsov | 1 | 5
13 | (Belarus) M Mirnyi | 4 | 6^{5}
(Slovakia) K Beck | 6 | 7^{7}
Q | (Israel) N Okun | 7^{9} | 2 | 7^{7}
17 | (Sweden) T Enqvist | 6^{7} | 6 | 6^{5}

Third round
(France) G Carraz | 7 | 6
Q | (Australia) T Reid | 5 | 3
(Slovakia) K Beck | 6^{2} | 2
Q | (Israel) N Okun | 7^{7} | 6

Quarterfinals
(France) G Carraz | 4 | 6 | 6
Q | (Israel) N Okun | 6 | 3 | 2
