= 2003 RCA Championships =

- Date: July 21–27
- Edition: 16th
- Category: International Series
- Draw: 48S / 16D
- Prize money: $575,000
- Surface: Hard / outdoor
- Location: Indianapolis, IN, US
- Venue: Indianapolis Tennis Center

Champions

Singles
- (United States) Andy Roddick

Doubles
- (Croatia) Mario Ančić / (Israel) Andy Ram
← 2002 ·	Indianapolis Tennis Championships	· 2004 →

The 2003 RCA Championships was a men's tennis tournament played on outdoor hard courts at the Indianapolis Tennis Center in Indianapolis in the United States and was part of the International Series of the 2003 ATP Tour. It was the 16th edition of the tournament and ran from July 21 through July 27, 2003. First-seeded Andy Roddick won the singles title.

== Finals ==
=== Singles ===
(United States) Andy Roddick defeated (Thailand) Paradorn Srichaphan 7–6^{(7–2)}, 6–4

- It was Roddick's 3rd title of the year and the 10th of his career.

=== Doubles ===
(Croatia) Mario Ančić / (Israel) Andy Ram defeated (United States) Diego Ayala / (United States) Robby Ginepri 2–6, 7–6^{(7–3)}, 7–5

- It was Ančić's only title of the year and the 1st of his career. It was Ram's 1st title of the year and the 1st of his career.
