= 2004 RCA Championships =

- Date: July 19–26
- Edition: 17th
- Category: International Series
- Draw: 48S / 16D
- Prize money: $575,000
- Surface: Hard / outdoor
- Location: Indianapolis, U.S.
- Venue: Indianapolis Tennis Center

Champions

Singles
- (United States) Andy Roddick

Doubles
- (Australia) Jordan Kerr / (United States) Jim Thomas
← 2003 ·	Indianapolis Tennis Championships	· 2005 →

The 2004 RCA Championships was a men's tennis tournament played on outdoor hard courts. It was the 17th edition of the event known that year as the RCA Championships, and was part of the International Series of the 2004 ATP Tour. It took place at the Indianapolis Tennis Center in Indianapolis, Indiana, United States, from July 19 through July 26, 2004. It was the second event of the 2004 US Open series, after the Mercedes Benz Cup in Los Angeles. Andy Roddick won the singles title.

== Finals ==
=== Singles ===
(United States) Andy Roddick defeated (Germany) Nicolas Kiefer, 6–2, 6–3

- It was Andy Roddick's 4th title of the year, and his 15th overall.

=== Doubles ===
(Australia) Jordan Kerr / (United States) Jim Thomas defeated (Zimbabwe) Wayne Black / (Zimbabwe) Kevin Ullyett 6–7^{(7–9)}, 7–6^{(7–3)}, 6–3
