= 2005 RCA Championships – Singles =

Singles
- 2005 RCA Championships

Final
- Champion: (United States) Robby Ginepri
- Runner-up: (United States) Taylor Dent
- Score: 4–6, 6–0, 3–0^{r}

Details
- Draw: 56 (4 Q / 4 WC )
- Seeds: 16

Events
Singles	Doubles
← 2004 ·	Indianapolis Tennis Championships	· 2006 →

Andy Roddick was the defending champion, but lost in the quarterfinals.

Robby Ginepri won the title, defeating Taylor Dent, who retired from the final due to heat exhaustion with Ginepri leading 4–6, 6–0, 3–0.

== Seeds ==
1. (United States) Andy Roddick (quarterfinals)
2. (Germany) Nicolas Kiefer (quarterfinals)
3. (Slovakia) Dominik Hrbatý (second round)
4. (United States) Taylor Dent (final, retired due to heat exhaustion)
5. ~~(Croatia) Mario Ančić~~ (withdrew due to a back injury)
6. (Belarus) Max Mirnyi (second round)
7. (United Kingdom) Greg Rusedski (semifinals)
8. (United States) Vincent Spadea (second round)
9. (Thailand) Paradorn Srichaphan (third round)
10. (Slovakia) Karol Beck (semifinals)
11. (France) Cyril Saulnier (second round)
12. (Denmark) Kenneth Carlsen (third round)
13. (Czech Republic) Jan Hernych (second round)
14. (South Korea) Lee Hyung-taik (second round)
15. (Belgium) Xavier Malisse (second round)
16. (United States) Mardy Fish (third round, retired due to a wrist injury)

== Draw ==
=== Key ===
- Q = Qualifier
- WC = Wild card
- LL = Lucky loser
- Alt = Alternate
- SE = Special exempt
- PR = Protected ranking
- ITF = ITF entry
- JE = Junior exempt
- w/o = Walkover
- r = Retired
- d = Defaulted
- SR = Special ranking

=== Finals ===
Semifinals
(United States) Robby Ginepri	5	6	6
10	(Slovakia) Karol Beck	7	2	3
4	(United States) Taylor Dent	6	6
7	(United Kingdom) Greg Rusedski	4	4

Final
(United States) Robby Ginepri	4	6	3
4	(United States) Taylor Dent	6	0	0^{r}

=== Top half ===
==== Section 1 ====
First round
Q	(Chinese Taipei) Y-h Lu	3	4
(Russia) D Tursunov	6	6
(Israel) N Okun	6	6
Q	(United States) B Evans	3	3
(France) G Carraz	7	6^{3}	7
(United States) J Blake	5	7^{7}	5
(Sweden) M Ryderstedt	1	4
(United States) R Ginepri	6	6

Second round
1	(United States) A Roddick	7^{8}	6^{7}	7^{7}
(Russia) D Tursunov	6^{6}	7^{9}	6^{5}
(Israel) N Okun	6	6
15	(Belgium) X Malisse	2	4
9	(Thailand) P Srichaphan	6	7^{7}
(France) G Carraz	3	6^{3}
(United States) R Ginepri	6	6
8	(United States) V Spadea	4	3

Third round
1	(United States) A Roddick	6	6
(Israel) N Okun	3	3
9	(Thailand) P Srichaphan	0	4
(United States) R Ginepri	6	6

Quarterfinals
1	(United States) A Roddick	6	6^{2}	5
(United States) R Ginepri	4	7^{7}	7

==== Section 2 ====
First round
(United States) J Morrison	4	4
(Switzerland) G Bastl	6	6
WC	(United Kingdom) A Murray	6	6
LL	(United States) J Witten	4	2
(Czech Republic) L Dlouhý	4	1
(Sweden) J Björkman	6	6
WC	(United States) R Ram	7	7^{7}
(Netherlands) S Schalken	5	6^{1}

Second round
3	(Slovakia) D Hrbatý	4	7^{8}	4
(Switzerland) G Bastl	6	6^{6}	6
WC	(United Kingdom) A Murray	4	6	4
16/WC	(United States) M Fish	6	4	6
10	(Slovakia) K Beck	6	7
(Sweden) J Björkman	4	5
WC	(United States) R Ram	7	7^{7}
LL	(Czech Republic) T Cakl	5	6^{3}

Third round
(Switzerland) G Bastl	1
16/WC	(United States) M Fish	2^{r}
10	(Slovakia) K Beck	6	6
WC	(United States) R Ram	2	4

Quarterfinals
(Switzerland) G Bastl	4	5
10	(Slovakia) K Beck	6	7

==== Section 3 ====
First round
PR	(Colombia) A Falla	0	4
(United States) P Goldstein	6	6
(Ecuador) G Lapentti	7^{7}	6
Q	(United States) M Washington	6^{3}	3
(United States) A Delić	4	7^{7}	3
(Germany) B Phau	6	6^{4}	6
(United States) J-M Gambill	7^{12}	6
WC	(United States) D Young	6^{10}	2

Second round
6	(Belarus) M Mirnyi	6	3	3
(United States) P Goldstein	0	6	6
(Ecuador) G Lapentti	6	5	6
11	(France) C Saulnier	4	7	2
13	(Czech Republic) J Hernych	6^{3}	3
(Germany) B Phau	7^{7}	6
(United States) J-M Gambill	3	4
4	(United States) T Dent	6	6

Third round
(United States) P Goldstein	6	6
(Ecuador) G Lapentti	3	2
(Germany) B Phau	2	2
4	(United States) T Dent	6	6

Quarterfinals
(United States) P Goldstein	3	2
4	(United States) T Dent	6	6

==== Section 4 ====
First round
(France) J-R Lisnard	3	3
(South Africa) W Moodie	6	6
(Cyprus) M Baghdatis	1	6	6
Q	(France) S de Chaunac	6	3	4
(United States) K Kim	6	6^{3}	6
(Croatia) I Karlović	4	7^{7}	3
(France) A Dupuis	7	6
PR	(Germany) A Popp	5	1

Second round
7	(United Kingdom) G Rusedski	6^{4}	7^{9}	7^{7}
(South Africa) W Moodie	7^{7}	6^{7}	6^{2}
(Cyprus) M Baghdatis	5	6	4
12	(Denmark) K Carlsen	7	2	6
14	(South Korea) H-t Lee	6^{8}	4
(United States) K Kim	7^{10}	6
(France) A Dupuis	5	4
2	(Germany) N Kiefer	7	6

Third round
7	(United Kingdom) G Rusedski	7^{7}	6
12	(Denmark) K Carlsen	6^{3}	2
(United States) K Kim	1	3
2	(Germany) N Kiefer	6	6

Quarterfinals
7	(United Kingdom) G Rusedski	3	7^{7}	6
2	(Germany) N Kiefer	6	6^{4}	4
