= 2002 RCA Championships – Singles =

Singles
- 2002 RCA Championships

Final
- Champion: (United Kingdom) Greg Rusedski
- Runner-up: (Spain) Félix Mantilla
- Score: 6–7^{(6–8)}, 6–4, 6–4

Details
- Draw: 56 (7 Q / 5 WC )
- Seeds: 16

Events
Singles	Doubles
- Indianapolis Tennis Championships

Patrick Rafter was the defending champion but did not compete that year.

Greg Rusedski won in the final 6–7^{(6–8)}, 6–4, 6–4 against Félix Mantilla.

== Seeds ==
The top eight seeds received a bye to the second round.

1. (Australia) Lleyton Hewitt (third round)
2. (Russia) ~~Marat Safin~~ (withdrew because of an upper respiratory infection)
3. (Germany) Tommy Haas (semifinals)
4. (Russia) Yevgeny Kafelnikov (second round)
5. (United Kingdom) Tim Henman (third round, withdrew because of a right shoulder injury)
6. (France) Sébastien Grosjean (quarterfinals)
7. (Morocco) Younes El Aynaoui (second round)
8. (Belgium) Xavier Malisse (third round)
9. (Germany) Rainer Schüttler (semifinals)
10. (Belarus) Max Mirnyi (second round)
11. (Romania) Andrei Pavel (third round)
12. (Croatia) Ivan Ljubičić (first round)
13. (Switzerland) Michel Kratochvil (third round)
14. (United Kingdom) Greg Rusedski (champion)
15. (France) Arnaud Clément (quarterfinals)
16. (France) Fabrice Santoro (third round)

== Draw ==
Key

- Q = Qualifier
- WC = Wild card
- LL = Lucky loser
- Alt = Alternate
- ITF = ITF entry
- PR = Protected ranking
- SR = Special ranking
- SE = Special exempt
- JE = Junior exempt
- JR = Junior Accelerator Programme entrant
- CO = College Accelerator Programme entrant
- NG = Next Gen Accelerator Program entrant
- w/o = Walkover
- r = Retired
- d = Defaulted

=== Finals ===
Semifinals
14	(United Kingdom) Greg Rusedski	3	6	6
3	(Germany) Tommy Haas	6	3	3
(Spain) Félix Mantilla	6	1	6
9	(Germany) Rainer Schüttler	4	6	4

Final
14	(United Kingdom) Greg Rusedski	6^{6}	6	6
(Spain) Félix Mantilla	7^{8}	4	4

=== Top half ===
==== Section 1 ====
First round
(Spain) A Martín	6^{6}	7	6
WC	(Sweden) M Larsson	7^{8}	5	3
(Spain) F López	5	7	3
Q	(France) L Roux	7	5	6
(Spain) A Montañés	6^{5}	4
14	(United Kingdom) G Rusedski	7^{7}	6
12	(Croatia) I Ljubičić	4	2
(Netherlands) M Verkerk	6	6
(Germany) A Popp	4	6	6
Q	(France) C Saulnier	6	2	4
(Chile) N Massú	6	6
WC	(United States) R Ram	3	3

Second round
1	(Australia) L Hewitt	6	7
(Spain) A Martín	3	5
Q	(France) L Roux	3	2
14	(United Kingdom) G Rusedski	6	6
(Netherlands) M Verkerk	6	7
(Germany) A Popp	4	5
(Chile) N Massú	3	6	5
5	(United Kingdom) T Henman	6	1	7

Third round
1	(Australia) L Hewitt	6^{3}	4
14	(United Kingdom) G Rusedski	7^{7}	6
(Netherlands) M Verkerk	w/o
5	(United Kingdom) T Henman

Quarterfinals
14	(United Kingdom) G Rusedski	6	7^{8}
(Netherlands) M Verkerk	4	6^{6}

==== Section 2 ====
First round
(United States) R Ginepri	6^{0}	4
WC	(Sweden) M Norman	7^{7}	6
Q	(Germany) D Prinosil	6	6^{2}	6
(Czech Republic) B Ulihrach	3	7^{7}	2
Q	(Azerbaijan) E Ağayev	0	2
13	(Switzerland) M Kratochvil	6	6
10	(Belarus) M Mirnyi	6	7
(France) P-H Mathieu	2	5
(Germany) N Kiefer	7^{7}	6
(Denmark) K Pless	6^{5}	2
(France) M Llodra	2	4
(Armenia) S Sargsian	6	6

Second round
3	(Germany) T Haas	7^{11}	6
WC	(Sweden) M Norman	6^{9}	3
Q	(Germany) D Prinosil	1	4
13	(Switzerland) M Kratochvil	6	6
10	(Belarus) M Mirnyi	4	5
(Germany) N Kiefer	6	7
(Armenia) S Sargsian	6	3	3
6	(France) S Grosjean	3	6	6

Third round
3	(Germany) T Haas	4	7	6
13	(Switzerland) M Kratochvil	6	5	1
(Germany) N Kiefer	6^{4}	3
6	(France) S Grosjean	7^{7}	6

Quarterfinals
3	(Germany) T Haas	6	3	6
6	(France) S Grosjean	3	6	3

=== Bottom half ===
==== Section 3 ====
First round
(Switzerland) I Heuberger	5	1
(Spain) F Mantilla	7	6
(Spain) F Clavet	6^{1}	7	6
(Germany) B Phau	7^{7}	5	1
(United States) J Morrison	6	3	2
11	(Romania) A Pavel	4	6	6
15	(France) A Clément	6	7
(Sweden) J Björkman	4	5
WC	(United States) B Baker	4	2
(South Africa) W Ferreira	6	6
WC	(Croatia) M Ančić	4	6	6
(Czech Republic) O Fukárek	6	2	2

Second round
7	(Morocco) Y El Aynaoui	6^{2}	5
(Spain) F Mantilla	7^{7}	7
(Spain) F Clavet	4	6	3
11	(Romania) A Pavel	6	2	6
15	(France) A Clément	6	4	7^{7}
(South Africa) W Ferreira	4	6	6^{1}
WC	(Croatia) M Ančić	4	6	6
4	(Russia) Y Kafelnikov	6	2	4

Third round
(Spain) F Mantilla	2	6	6
11	(Romania) A Pavel	6	4	1
15	(France) A Clément	6	6
WC	(Croatia) M Ančić	3	4

Quarterfinals
(Spain) F Mantilla	1	6	6
15	(France) A Clément	6	4	4

==== Section 4 ====
First round
(United States) T Dent	6	7^{7}
Q	(United States) G Weiner	4	6^{5}
Q	(Israel) J Erlich	6	6
(Romania) A Voinea	2	3
(Australia) M Philippoussis	6^{2}	6^{4}
9	(Germany) R Schüttler	7^{7}	7^{7}
16	(France) F Santoro	6	6
(Israel) H Levy	2	2
(Australia) W Arthurs	6	6
(South Korea) H-T Lee	4	3
(Paraguay) R Delgado	6^{3}	6^{1}
Q	(Austria) S Koubek	7^{7}	7^{7}

Second round
8	(Belgium) X Malisse	6	6
(United States) T Dent	4	4
Q	(Israel) J Erlich	1	7	2
9	(Germany) R Schüttler	6	5	6
16	(France) F Santoro	6	6
(Australia) W Arthurs	4	2
Q	(Austria) S Koubek	2	6^{4}
LL	(France) A Di Pasquale	6	7^{7}

Third round
8	(Belgium) X Malisse	3	2
9	(Germany) R Schüttler	6	6
16	(France) F Santoro	6^{5}	2
LL	(France) A Di Pasquale	7^{7}	6

Quarterfinals
9	(Germany) R Schüttler	2	6	6
LL	(France) A Di Pasquale	6	4	1
