= 2003 RCA Championships – Doubles =

Doubles
- 2003 RCA Championships

Final
- Champions: (Croatia) Mario Ančić (Israel) Andy Ram
- Runners-up: (United States) Diego Ayala (United States) Robby Ginepri
- Score: 2–6, 7–6^{(7–3)}, 7–5

Events
Singles	Doubles
← 2002 ·	Indianapolis Tennis Championships	· 2004 →

Mark Knowles and Daniel Nestor were the defending champions but did not compete that year.

Mario Ančić and Andy Ram won in the final 2–6, 7–6^{(7–3)}, 7–5 against Diego Ayala and Robby Ginepri.

== Seeds ==
1. (United States) Justin Gimelstob / (Serbia and Montenegro) Nenad Zimonjić (semifinals)
2. (Australia) Jordan Kerr / (Sweden) Johan Landsberg (quarterfinals)
3. (United States) Brandon Coupe / (United States) Jim Thomas (semifinals)
4. (United States) Jan-Michael Gambill / (United States) Brian Vahaly (first round)

== Draw ==
=== Key ===
- Q = Qualifier
- WC = Wild card
- LL = Lucky loser
- Alt = Alternate
- SE = Special exempt
- PR = Protected ranking
- ITF = ITF entry
- JE = Junior exempt
- w/o = Walkover
- r = Retired
- d = Defaulted
- SR = Special ranking

First round
1	(United States) J Gimelstob (Serbia and Montenegro) N Zimonjić	7^{7}	6
(France) G Carraz (France) C Saulnier	6^{3}	4
WC	(India) P Amritraj (India) S Amritraj	4	4
(Germany) N Kiefer (Netherlands) S Schalken	6	6
4	(United States) J-M Gambill (United States) B Vahaly	2	6^{5}
(Denmark) K Carlsen (Thailand) P Srichaphan	6	7^{7}
(Israel) N Okun (Argentina) S Roitman	3	5
(Croatia) M Ančić (Israel) A Ram	6	7
(Belgium) X Malisse (The Bahamas) M Merklein	6	6
(Australia) S Draper (Australia) P Luczak	3	4
(United States) J Marshall (United States) E Taino	2	3
3	(United States) B Coupe (United States) J Thomas	6	6
(South Korea) H-T Lee (United States) C Mamiit	6^{13}	1
(United States) D Ayala (United States) R Ginepri	7^{15}	6
WC	(United States) R Ram (United States) B Reynolds	1	6^{3}
2	(Australia) J Kerr (Sweden) J Landsberg	6	7^{7}

Quarterfinals
1	(United States) J Gimelstob (Serbia and Montenegro) N Zimonjić	3	6	6
(Germany) N Kiefer (Netherlands) S Schalken	6	4	4
(Denmark) K Carlsen (Thailand) P Srichaphan	4	6^{1}
(Croatia) M Ančić (Israel) A Ram	6	7^{7}
(Belgium) X Malisse (The Bahamas) M Merklein	6^{2}	6^{1}
3	(United States) B Coupe (United States) J Thomas	7^{7}	7^{7}
(United States) D Ayala (United States) R Ginepri	7	6
2	(Australia) J Kerr (Sweden) J Landsberg	5	4

Semifinals
1	(United States) J Gimelstob (Serbia and Montenegro) N Zimonjić	5	3
(Croatia) M Ančić (Israel) A Ram	7	6
3	(United States) B Coupe (United States) J Thomas	4	6^{8}
(United States) D Ayala (United States) R Ginepri	6	7^{10}

Final
(Croatia) M Ančić (Israel) A Ram	2	7^{7}	7
(United States) D Ayala (United States) R Ginepri	6	6^{3}	5
