= 2005 RCA Championships =

Tennis tournament

- Date: July 18–25
- Edition: 18th
- Category: International Series
- Prize money: $600,000
- Surface: Hard / outdoor
- Location: Indianapolis, United States
- Venue: Indianapolis Tennis Center

Champions

Singles
- (United States) Robby Ginepri

Doubles
- (Australia) Paul Hanley / (United States) Graydon Oliver
- Indianapolis Tennis Championships

The 2005 RCA Championships was a tennis tournament played on outdoor hard courts. It was the 18th edition of the event known that year as the RCA Championships, and was part of the International Series of the 2005 ATP Tour. It took place at the Indianapolis Tennis Center in Indianapolis, Indiana, United States, from July 18 through July 25, 2005. It was the first event of the 2005 US Open series. Robby Ginepri won the singles title.

== Finals ==
=== Singles ===
(United States) Robby Ginepri defeated (United States) Taylor Dent, 4–6, 6–3, 3–0 (retired)

- It was Robby Ginepri's 1st title of the year, and his 2nd overall.

=== Doubles ===
(Australia) Paul Hanley / (United States) Graydon Oliver defeated (Sweden) Simon Aspelin / (Australia) Todd Perry, 6–2, 3–1 (retired)
