= 2002 RCA Championships =

- Date: August 12–18
- Edition: 15th
- Category: International Series Gold
- Draw: 56S / 28D
- Prize money: $700,000
- Surface: Hard / outdoor
- Location: Indianapolis, IN, US
- Venue: Indianapolis Tennis Center

Champions

Singles
- (United Kingdom) Greg Rusedski

Doubles
- (The Bahamas) Mark Knowles / (Canada) Daniel Nestor
← 2001 ·	Indianapolis Tennis Championships	· 2003 →

The 2002 RCA Championships was a men's tennis tournament played on outdoor hard courts at the Indianapolis Tennis Center in Indianapolis in the United States and was part of the International Series Gold of the 2002 ATP Tour. It was the 15th edition of the tournament and ran from August 12 through August 18, 2002. Greg Rusedski, who was seeded 14th, won the singles title.

== Finals ==
=== Singles ===
(United Kingdom) Greg Rusedski defeated (Spain) Félix Mantilla 6–7^{(6–8)}, 6–4, 6–4

- It was Rusedski's 2nd title of the year and the 15th of his career.

=== Doubles ===
(The Bahamas) Mark Knowles / (Canada) Daniel Nestor defeated (India) Mahesh Bhupathi / (Belarus) Max Mirnyi 7–6^{(7–4)}, 6–7^{(5–7)}, 6–4

- It was Knowles' 6th title of the year and the 23rd of his career. It was Nestor's 5th title of the year and the 25th of his career.
