= 2002 RCA Championships – Doubles =

Doubles
- 2002 RCA Championships

Final
- Champions: (The Bahamas) Mark Knowles (Canada) Daniel Nestor
- Runners-up: (India) Mahesh Bhupathi (Belarus) Max Mirnyi
- Score: 7–6^{(7–4)}, 6–7^{(5–7)}, 6–4

Events
Singles	Doubles
← 2001 ·	Indianapolis Tennis Championships	· 2003 →

Mark Knowles and Brian MacPhie were the defending champions but they competed with different partners that year, Knowles with Daniel Nestor and MacPhie with Nenad Zimonjić.

MacPhie and Zimonjić lost in the semifinals to Mahesh Bhupathi and Max Mirnyi.

Knowles and Nestor won in the final 7–6^{(7–4)}, 6–7^{(5–7)}, 6–4 against Bhupathi and Mirnyi.

== Seeds ==
The top four seeded teams received byes into the second round.

1. (The Bahamas) Mark Knowles / (Canada) Daniel Nestor (champions)
2. (Sweden) Jonas Björkman / (Australia) Todd Woodbridge (quarterfinals)
3. (India) Mahesh Bhupathi / (Belarus) Max Mirnyi (final)
4. (Australia) Joshua Eagle / (Australia) Sandon Stolle (semifinals)
5. (South Africa) Ellis Ferreira / (United States) Jeff Tarango (second round)
6. (South Africa) Robbie Koenig / (Germany) David Prinosil (quarterfinals)
7. (United States) Brian MacPhie / (Federal Republic of Yugoslavia) Nenad Zimonjić (semifinals)
8. (Czech Republic) Radek Štěpánek / (Czech Republic) Pavel Vízner (second round)

== Draw ==
=== Key ===
- Q = Qualifier
- WC = Wild card
- LL = Lucky loser
- Alt = Alternate
- SE = Special exempt
- PR = Protected ranking
- ITF = ITF entry
- JE = Junior exempt
- w/o = Walkover
- r = Retired
- d = Defaulted
- SR = Special ranking

=== Finals ===
Semifinals

Final

1
- (The Bahamas) Mark Knowles
- (Canada) Daniel Nestor
6
7^{9}

4
- (Australia) Joshua Eagle
- (Australia) Sandon Stolle
4
6^{7}

1
- (The Bahamas) Mark Knowles
- (Canada) Daniel Nestor
7^{7}
6^{5}
6

3
- (India) Mahesh Bhupathi
- (Belarus) Max Mirnyi
6^{4}
7^{7}
4

3
- (India) Mahesh Bhupathi
- (Belarus) Max Mirnyi
3
7
6

7
(United States) Brian MacPhie
(Federal Republic of Yugoslavia) Nenad Zimonjić
6
5
3

=== Top half ===
First round

Second round

Quarterfinals

Semifinals

1
- (The Bahamas) M Knowles
- (Canada) D Nestor
6
6

WC
- (Australia) S Draper
- (Australia) L Hewitt
7
5
6

WC
- (Australia) S Draper
- (Australia) L Hewitt
3
3

- (Switzerland) M Kratochvil
- (Spain) A Martín
5
7
3

1
- (The Bahamas) M Knowles
- (Canada) D Nestor
6
6

- (Germany) N Kiefer
- (Romania) A Pavel
3
7
4

- (Australia) W Arthurs
- (Australia) A Kratzmann
4
4

- (Australia) W Arthurs
- (Australia) A Kratzmann
6
5
6

- (Australia) W Arthurs
- (Australia) A Kratzmann
6^{4}
6
6

WC
- (United States) L Jensen
- (United States) M Jensen
2
4

5
- (South Africa) E Ferreira
- (United States) J Tarango
7^{7}
4
1

5
- (South Africa) E Ferreira
- (United States) J Tarango
6
6

1
- (The Bahamas) M Knowles
- (Canada) D Nestor
6
7^{9}

4
- (Australia) J Eagle
- (Australia) S Stolle
4
6^{7}

4
- (Australia) J Eagle
- (Australia) S Stolle
3
6
6

- (Czech Republic) F Čermák
- (Czech Republic) P Luxa
7^{7}
6^{7}
6

- (Czech Republic) F Čermák
- (Czech Republic) P Luxa
6
2
4

- (Australia) B Ellwood
- (Australia) P Hanley
6^{3}
7^{9}
4

4
- (Australia) J Eagle
- (Australia) S Stolle
6
3
6

- (Australia) T Crichton
- (Australia) T Perry
1
2

6
- (South Africa) R Koenig
- (Germany) D Prinosil
3
6
3

- (Australia) A Florent
- (Australia) D Macpherson
6
6

- (Australia) A Florent
- (Australia) D Macpherson
3
6^{2}

- (South Africa) W Ferreira
- (United States) R Leach
6^{5}
6
6^{5}

6
- (South Africa) R Koenig
- (Germany) D Prinosil
6
7^{7}

6
- (South Africa) R Koenig
- (Germany) D Prinosil
7^{7}
3
7^{7}

=== Bottom half ===
First round

Second round

Quarterfinals

Semifinals

8
- (Czech Republic) R Štěpánek
- (Czech Republic) P Vízner
6
6

ALT
- (Sweden) M Norman
- (Armenia) S Sargsian
2
3

8
- (Czech Republic) R Štěpánek
- (Czech Republic) P Vízner
1
5

- (France) M Llodra
- (France) F Santoro
6
6^{5}
4

- (United States) J Morrison
- (United States) G Weiner
6
7

- (United States) J Morrison
- (United States) G Weiner
3
7^{7}
6

- (United States) J Morrison
- (United States) G Weiner
6
6^{3}
4

WC
- (India) P Amritraj
- (India) S Amritraj
6
6

3
- (India) M Bhupathi
- (Belarus) M Mirnyi
4
7^{7}
6

- (Austria) S Koubek
- (Germany) R Schüttler
4
4

WC
- (India) P Amritraj
- (India) S Amritraj
2
3

3
- (India) M Bhupathi
- (Belarus) M Mirnyi
6
6

3
- (India) M Bhupathi
- (Belarus) M Mirnyi
3
7
6

7
(United States) B MacPhie
(Federal Republic of Yugoslavia) N Zimonjić
6
7^{7}

7
(United States) B MacPhie
(Federal Republic of Yugoslavia) N Zimonjić
6
5
3

- (France) A Clément
- (France) S Grosjean
3
6^{3}

7
(United States) B MacPhie
(Federal Republic of Yugoslavia) N Zimonjić
7^{7}
6

- (United States) D Bowen
- (Australia) A Fisher
2
6
7^{7}

- (United States) D Bowen
- (Australia) A Fisher
6^{3}
4

- (Czech Republic) O Fukárek
- (South Africa) P Rosner
6
3
6^{3}

7
(United States) B MacPhie
(Federal Republic of Yugoslavia) N Zimonjić
7
6

- (Czech Republic) L Friedl
- (Belgium) T Vanhoudt
4
4

2
- (Sweden) J Björkman
- (Australia) T Woodbridge
5
3

- (Morocco) Y El Aynaoui
- (Croatia) I Ljubičić
6
6

- (Morocco) Y El Aynaoui
- (Croatia) I Ljubičić

2
- (Sweden) J Björkman
- (Australia) T Woodbridge
w/o
