= 2005 RCA Championships – Doubles =

Doubles
- 2005 RCA Championships

Final
- Champions: (Australia) Paul Hanley (United States) Graydon Oliver
- Runners-up: (Sweden) Simon Aspelin (Australia) Todd Perry
- Score: 6–2, 3–1^{r}

Events
| Singles | Doubles |
- Indianapolis Tennis Championships

Jordan Kerr and Jim Thomas were the defending champions, but lost in the first round this year.

Paul Hanley and Graydon Oliver won the title, defeating Simon Aspelin and Todd Perry, who retired from the final with Hanley and Oliver leading 6–2, 3–1.

== Seeds ==
1. (Sweden) Simon Aspelin / (Australia) Todd Perry (final, retired)
2. (Australia) Paul Hanley / (United States) Graydon Oliver (champions)
3. (Argentina) Gastón Etlis / (Argentina) Martín Rodríguez (first round)
4. (Australia) Stephen Huss / (South Africa) Wesley Moodie (first round)

== Draw ==
Key

- Q = Qualifier
- WC = Wild card
- LL = Lucky loser
- Alt = Alternate
- ITF = ITF entry
- PR = Protected ranking
- SR = Special ranking
- SE = Special exempt
- JE = Junior exempt
- JR = Junior Accelerator Programme entrant
- CO = College Accelerator Programme entrant
- NG = Next Gen Accelerator Program entrant
- w/o = Walkover
- r = Retired
- d = Defaulted

=== Draw ===
First round
1 | (Sweden) S Aspelin (Australia) T Perry | 7^{7} | 7^{10}
(United States) P Goldstein (United States) V Spadea | 6^{2} | 6^{8}
(Denmark) K Carlsen (France) C Saulnier | 4 | 2
(South Africa) J Coetzee (United States) T Phillips | 6 | 6
3 | (Argentina) G Etlis (Argentina) M Rodríguez | 6^{11} | 6 | 6^{4}
(Thailand) Sa Ratiwatana (Thailand) So Ratiwatana | 7^{13} | 4 | 7^{7}
(South Africa) C Haggard (Belgium) X Malisse | 7^{7} | 7^{7}
(United States) T Parrott (Thailand) P Srichaphan | 6^{5} | 6^{2}
(Slovakia) D Hrbatý (Germany) N Kiefer | 3 | 6 | 6
WC | (United States) J Blake (United States) M Fish | 6 | 4 | 4
(United States) K Kim (South Korea) H-t Lee | 6 | 0 | 6
4 | (Australia) S Huss (South Africa) W Moodie | 4 | 6 | 4
WC | (United States) T Dent (United States) J-M Gambill | 7^{7} | 6
(United States) J Marshall (United States) H Montgomery | 6^{4} | 4
(Australia) J Kerr (United States) J Thomas | 3 | 6^{4}
2 | (Australia) P Hanley (United States) G Oliver | 6 | 7^{7}

Quarterfinals
1 | (Sweden) S Aspelin (Australia) T Perry | 6^{3} | 6 | 6
(South Africa) J Coetzee (United States) T Phillips | 7^{7} | 4 | 4
(Thailand) Sa Ratiwatana (Thailand) So Ratiwatana | 3 | 6^{3}
(South Africa) C Haggard (Belgium) X Malisse | 6 | 7^{7}
(Slovakia) D Hrbatý (Germany) N Kiefer | 6 | 6
(United States) K Kim (South Korea) H-t Lee | 3 | 0
WC | (United States) T Dent (United States) J-M Gambill | 6^{3} | 6^{5}
2 | (Australia) P Hanley (United States) G Oliver | 7^{7} | 7^{7}

Semifinals
1 | (Sweden) S Aspelin (Australia) T Perry | 6 | 6
(South Africa) C Haggard (Belgium) X Malisse | 4 | 4
(Slovakia) D Hrbatý (Germany) N Kiefer | 6^{2} | 4
2 | (Australia) P Hanley (United States) G Oliver | 7^{7} | 6

Final
1 | (Sweden) S Aspelin (Australia) T Perry | 2 | 1^{r}
2 | (Australia) P Hanley (United States) G Oliver | 6 | 3
