= Diego Ayala (tennis) =

American tennis player (born 1979)

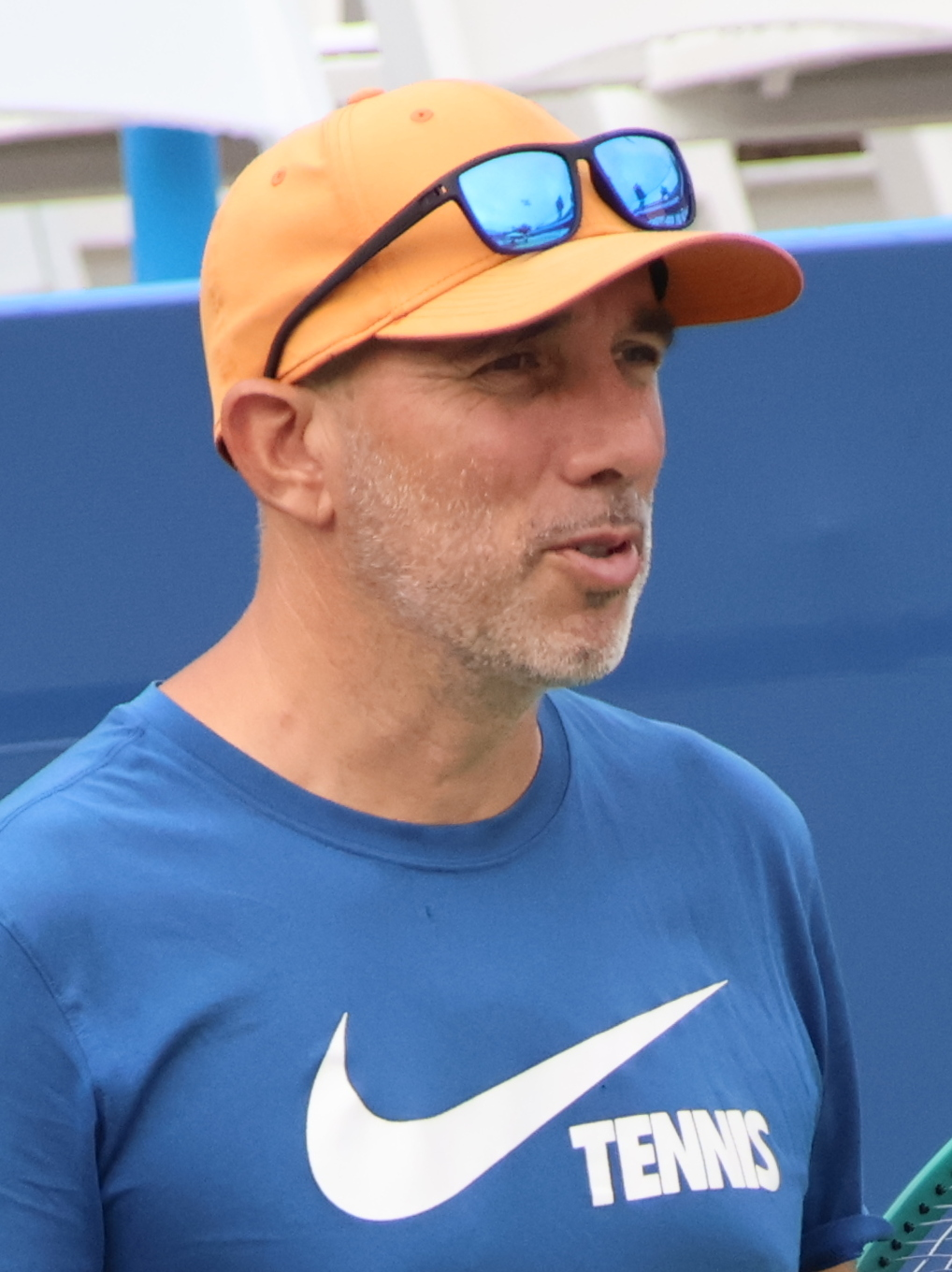
- Ayala in 2025
- Full name: Diego Ayala
- Country (sports): United States
- Born: April 29, 1979 (age 47) Córdoba, Argentina
- Prize money: $72,482

Singles
- Career record: 0–1
- Career titles: 0
- Highest ranking: No. 431 (August 28, 2000)

Doubles
- Career record: 4–6
- Career titles: 0
- Highest ranking: No. 100 (July 28, 2003)

Grand Slam doubles results
- Wimbledon: 1R (2004)

Diego Ayala (born April 29, 1979) is a former professional tennis player from the United States.

== Biography ==
=== Early life ===
Born in Argentina, Ayala grew up in southern Florida and competed for the University of Miami in college tennis.

As a young player on the junior circuit he had a win over Roger Federer, at the 1997 Coffee Bowl competition.

=== Professional career ===
Ayala turned professional in 1998 and played most of his top level tennis in the doubles format, in which he reached as high as 100 in the world.

At the 2003 RCA Championships in Indianapolis he made the first and only final of his ATP Tour career. He and Robby Ginepri defeated the second and third seeded pairings en route to the final, where they faced Mario Ančić and Andy Ram. Ayala and Ginepri took the first set, then lost the second in a tiebreak, before losing a close final 5–7 in the third set. He also made it into the singles main draw, as a qualifier.

In 2004 he featured in the men's doubles at the Wimbledon Championships with Brian Vahaly, as lucky losers. The pair were beaten in the first round by David Škoch and Álex López Morón.

He won a total of three Challenger titles, all in doubles.

=== Coaching ===
Ayala has coached Robby Ginepri and Jelena Janković. He worked with Eugenie Bouchard at the 2005 Australian Open where she reached the quarter-finals. His association with Bouchard had begun when she was a junior and Ayala coached her at the Saviano Academy.

== ATP Tour career finals ==
=== Doubles: 1 (0–1) ===
Result	Date	Tournament	Tier	Surface	Partner	Opponent	Score
Runner-up	July 27, 2003	Indianapolis, U.S.	International Series	Hard	(United States) Robby Ginepri	(Croatia) Mario Ančić (Israel) Andy Ram	6–2, 6–7^{(3)}, 5–7

== Challenger titles ==
=== Doubles: (3) ===
No.	Year	Tournament	Surface	Partner	Opponents	Score
1.	2002	San Antonio, U.S.A.	Hard	(United States) Robert Kendrick	(United States) Hugo Armando (Serbia and Montenegro) Dušan Vemić	6–2, 6–4
2.	2003	Waikoloa, U.S.A.	Hard	(United States) Robert Kendrick	(United States) Levar Harper-Griffith (United States) Alex Kim	4–6, 7–6^{(2)}, 6–2
3.	2003	Fresno, U.S.A.	Hard	(United States) Travis Parrott	(United States) Paul Goldstein (United States) Jeff Morrison	7–5, 4–6, 6–3
