= Robby Ginepri =

American tennis player (born 1982)

Robert Ginepri
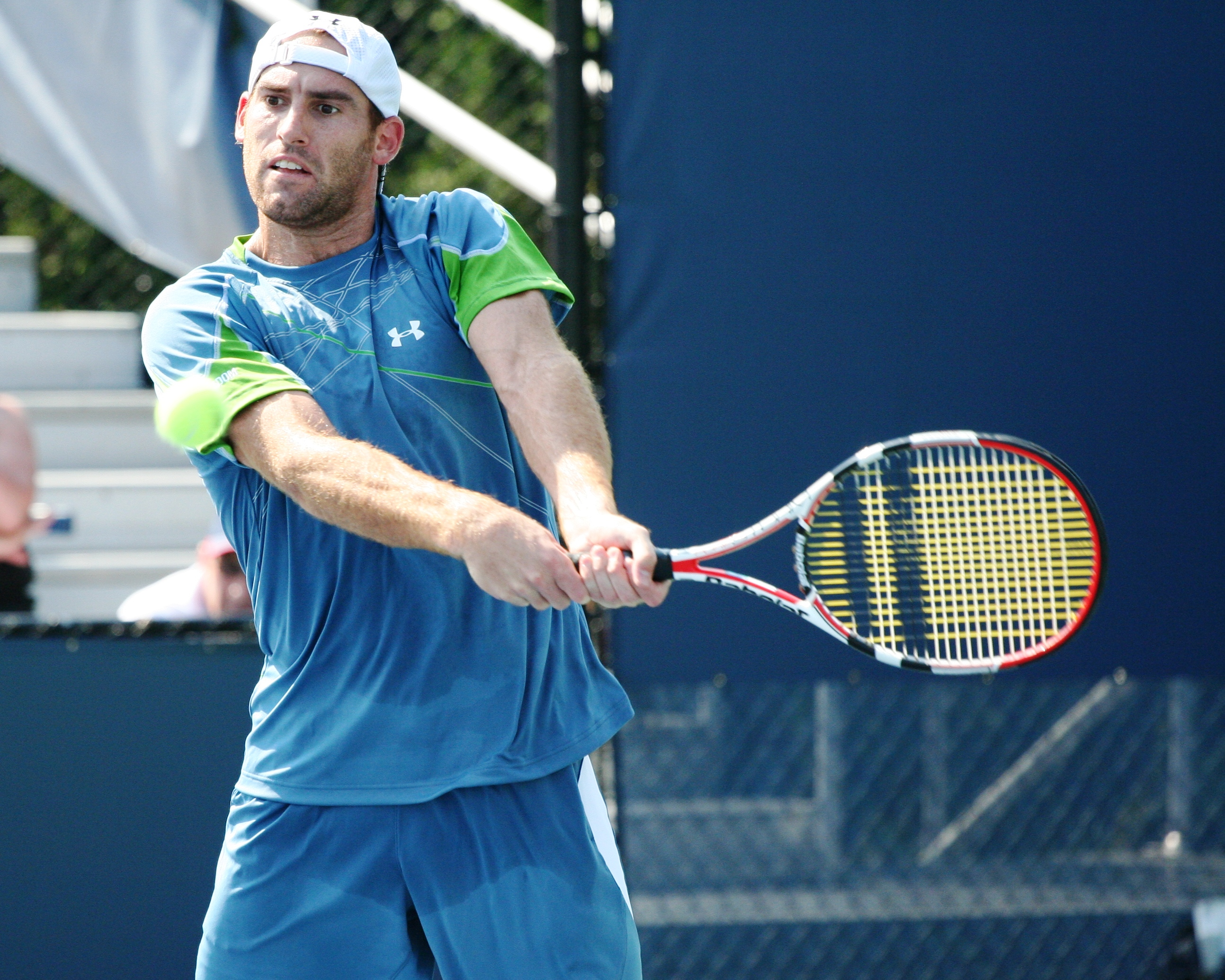
- Country (sports): United States
- Residence: Acworth, Georgia
- Born: October 7, 1982 (age 43) Fort Lauderdale, Florida, United States
- Height: 6 ft 0 in (183 cm)
- Turned pro: 2001
- Retired: 2015
- Plays: Right-handed (two-handed backhand)
- Prize money: US$3,897,123

Singles
- Career record: 188–204
- Career titles: 3
- Highest ranking: No. 15 (December 26, 2005)

Grand Slam singles results
- Australian Open: 4R (2004)
- French Open: 4R (2008, 2010)
- Wimbledon: 4R (2004)
- US Open: SF (2005)

Other tournaments
- Olympic Games: 1R (2008)

Doubles
- Career record: 21–81
- Career titles: 0
- Highest ranking: No. 134 (January 12, 2004)

Grand Slam doubles results
- Australian Open: 1R (2005, 2006, 2009)
- French Open: 1R (2004, 2005, 2007, 2009)
- Wimbledon: 2R (2007)
- US Open: 2R (2001, 2003)
- Last updated on: January 27, 2026.

Robert Louis Ginepri (/dʒɪˈnɛpri/ jih-NEP-ree; born October 7, 1982) is an American tennis coach and a former professional player. He won three ATP singles titles in his career and achieved a career-high ranking of World No. 15 in December 2005. Ginepri's best Grand Slam result was the semifinals of the 2005 US Open.

== Early life ==
Robby Ginepri is of Luxembourgish ancestry. His father, Rene, who is originally from Luxembourg, is a systems analyst and his mother, Nancy, is a second grade teacher. Has an older sister Jenni. He attended Joseph Wheeler High School, located in Marietta, Georgia (near Kennesaw). He graduated as a member of the class of 2001.

== Career ==
=== 2005: Best season: US Open semifinal, top 15 ===
Ginepri was the first player to be beaten by Novak Djokovic in the main draw of a Grand Slam tournament, at the 2005 French Open.

In August, he reached the semifinals of an ATP Masters Series tournament for the first time in his career, in Cincinnati, Ohio. He beat 2005 French Open runner-up Mariano Puerta in the first round, David Ferrer in the second round, 1998 French Open champion Carlos Moyá in the third round, and two-time Grand Slam singles titlist Marat Safin in the quarterfinals. He then lost to world no. 1 Roger Federer in the semifinals.

His summer hardcourt record was 14–3 when he arrived two weeks later at the 2005 US Open as an unseeded player. After defeating Guillermo Garcia-Lopez in the first round, and Andy Roddick's conqueror, Gilles Müller, in the second round, both in straight sets, Ginepri then put together three consecutive five-set wins, defeating Tommy Haas in the third round, Richard Gasquet in the fourth round, and Guillermo Coria in the quarterfinals. He then lost to Andre Agassi in the semifinals in five sets. Ginepri thus became the first player in the Open Era to play four consecutive five-set matches at the US Open.

In November at the Madrid Masters, Ginepri made it to another ATP Masters Series semifinal, before losing to eventual champion Rafael Nadal. He also won the inaugural Superset Tennis tournament, a groundbreaking one-set, one-day tournament, earning him prize money of $250,000. He reached world No. 15 in the ATP rankings on 26 December 2005, the highest ranking of his career.

=== 2006–2007 ===
Ginepri's results in 2006 did not match his successes in 2005. He lost in the second round of the Australian Open and the first round of both the French Open and Wimbledon. At the US Open, he lost in the third round to German Tommy Haas in a fifth-set tiebreaker. He finished the year 2006 ranked world No. 51 with a 24–26 record.

Ginepri lost in the third round of both the 2007 Australian Open and the US Open and the first round of both the French Open and Wimbledon. He finished the year 2007 ranked outside the top 100 for the first time since 2002, at world No. 134.

=== 2008–2009: Olympics debut ===
At the tournament in Delray Beach, Florida, Ginepri lost in the semifinals to James Blake. In his next tournament, the SAP Open in San Jose, California, Ginepri was able to defeat Blake in the quarterfinals, but lost in the semifinals to Radek Štěpánek. At the Tennis Channel Open in Las Vegas, Nevada, Ginepri reached the semifinals for his third consecutive tournament. Ginepri defeated Xavier Malisse in the first round, world No. 17 Marcos Baghdatis in the second round, and Ernests Gulbis in the quarterfinals, before falling to Kevin Anderson.

Ginepri then played the Tennis Masters Series Pacific Life Open in Indian Wells, California, losing in the second round to Carlos Moyá. At the Hypo Group Tennis International in Pörtschach, Austria, Ginepri lost in the quarterfinals to Juan Mónaco. He then made it to the fourth round of the 2008 French Open, before losing to 24th-seeded Fernando González.

On grass, Ginepri lost in the second round of The Artois Championships in London to Andy Roddick and the first round of Wimbledon to Gonzalez. On June 23, 2008, Ginepri's ranking was world No. 59, a rise of 112 places since January 28, 2008. In August 2008, Ginepri made his Olympic debut at the 2008 Olympic Games in Beijing, China.

In July 2009, Ginepri made his debut in the World Team Tennis league, playing for the new Washington Kastles team. At the 2009 US Open, Ginepri advanced to the second round, before losing to Nicolás Almagro in five sets.

=== 2010–2011 ===
Ginepri lost in the first round of the 2010 Australian Open. He beat Sam Querrey in four sets in the first round of the 2010 French Open and Potito Starace in the second round. He beat No. 16 Juan Carlos Ferrero in five sets, advancing to play in the fourth round, where he lost against Novak Djokovic in four sets. He was the only unseeded player left in the competition, along with qualifier Teymuraz Gabashvili, and the last American in the men's field. He lost to Robin Söderling in straight sets in the first round of Wimbledon.

In October, Ginepri was involved in a biking accident causing him to have surgery on his arm. He didn't return to the pro tour until July 2011.

Ginepri participated in the 2011 Atlanta Tennis Championships as a wildcard. His first match was against fellow wildcard Tommy Haas. He received a wildcard to the US Open, where he defeated Brazilian João Souza in the first round in a four-set match. He then lost to John Isner in the second round.

=== 2013–2014 ===
In the early part of 2013, Ginepri won a Futures event and made the final of a Challenger tournament. Ginepri made it to the quarterfinals of the 2013 U.S. Men's Clay Court Championships in Houston before losing to Juan Mónaco. He failed to qualify for the 2013 French Open and did not participate in Wimbledon.

In 2014, having competed in futures tournaments throughout the start of the season, Ginepri participated in his first Challenger at the 2014 Sarasota Open, retiring after one match in the first round of qualifying. After winning the USTA wildcard entry for the 2014 French Open, he lost to Rafael Nadal in the first round, in straight sets.

== Personal life ==
Since 2004, Ginepri owns the Olde Towne Athletic Club in Marietta. He married Josephine Stafford on September 29, 2012, in Atlanta, Georgia.

On February 22, 2007, Ginepri participated on Spike TV's Pros vs. Joes with Rik Smits, Rob Dibble, and Andre Rison. In 2012, he was briefly linked with actress Minnie Driver.

== Coaching career ==
Following his retirement in August 2015, he founded the Ginepri Performance Tennis Academy located at the Olde Towne Athletic Club, where he is currently its Director of Tennis Programming and is also an ATP and a USTA coach.

Ginepri coached the U.S. Davis Cup team starting in February 2018. At the same time he continued to coach Frances Tiafoe, with whom he started working since the fall of 2016, until the end of the 2018 season, but not on a completely full-time basis. He started coaching Marcos Giron in mid-2020 season, during the summer, into the 2021 season.

Ginepri coached Mackenzie McDonald in 2023, JJ Wolf in 2024. He coached Alex Michelsen also in 2024 starting around the US Open until the end of the 2025 season.

== Junior Grand Slam finals ==
=== Singles: 1 (1 runner-up) ===
Result	Year	Tournament	Surface	Opponent	Score
Loss	2000	US Open	Hard	(United States) Andy Roddick	1–6, 3–6

=== Doubles: 1 (1 runner-up) ===
Result	Year	Tournament	Surface	Partner	Opponents	Score
Loss	2000	US Open	Hard	(United States) Tres Davis	(United Kingdom) Lee Childs (United Kingdom) James Nelson	2–6, 4–6

== ATP career finals ==
=== Singles: 3 (3 titles) ===
Legend Grand Slam Tournaments (0–0) ATP World Tour Finals (0–0) ATP Masters Series (0–0) ATP Championship Series (0–0) ATP International Series (3–0)	Finals by surface Hard (2–0) Clay (0–0) Grass (1–0) Carpet (0–0)	Finals by setting Outdoors (3–0) Indoors (0–0)

Result	W–L	Date	Tournament	Tier	Surface	Opponent	Score
Win	1–0	Jul 2003	Newport, United States	International Series	Grass	(Austria) Jürgen Melzer	6–4, 6–7^{(3–7)}, 6–1
Win	2–0	Jul 2005	Indianapolis, United States	International Series	Hard	(United States) Taylor Dent	4–6, 6–0, 3–0 ret.
Win	3–0	Jul 2009	Indianapolis, United States	250 Series	Hard	(United States) Sam Querrey	6–2, 6–4

=== Doubles: 1 (1 runner-up) ===
Legend Grand Slam Tournaments (0–0) ATP World Tour Finals (0–0) ATP Masters Series (0–0) ATP Championship Series (0–0) ATP International Series (0–1)	Finals by surface Hard (0–1) Clay (0–0) Grass (0–0) Carpet (0–0)	Finals by setting Outdoors (0–1) Indoors (0–0)

Result	W–L	Date	Tournament	Tier	Surface	Partner	Opponents	Score
Loss	0–1	Jul 2003	Indianapolis, United States	International Series	Hard	(United States) Diego Ayala	(Croatia) Mario Ančić (Israel) Andy Ram	6–2, 6–7^{(3–7)}, 5–7

== ATP Challenger and ITF Futures Finals ==
=== Singles: 12 (7–5) ===
Legend ATP Challenger (5–5) ITF Futures (2–0)	Finals by surface Hard (4–5) Clay (3–0) Grass (0–0) Carpet (0–0)

Result	W–L	Date	Tournament	Tier	Surface	Opponent	Score
Win	1–0	Jun 2001	USA F15, Sunnyvale	Futures	Hard	(United States) Alex Kim	6–4, 6–3
Loss	1–1	Dec 2001	Urbana, United States	Challenger	Hard	(Croatia) Ivo Karlovic	4–6, 6–7^{(5–7)}
Win	2–1	May 2002	Rocky Mount, United States	Challenger	Clay	(United States) Alex Kim	6–3, 6–4
Win	3–1	Oct 2002	Burbank, United States	Challenger	Hard	(Sweden) Bjorn Rehnquist	7–6^{(8–6)}, 6–1
Win	4–1	Nov 2002	Champaign-Urbana, United States	Challenger	Hard	(Philippines) Eric Taino	6–1, 3–6, 6–3
Win	5–1	Jan 2003	Waikoloa, United States	Challenger	Hard	(South Africa) Neville Godwin	6–3, 6–3
Loss	5–2	Apr 2010	Tallahassee, United States	Challenger	Hard	(Argentina) Brian Dabul	6–4, 0–4 ret.
Loss	5–3	Aug 2011	Vancouver, Canada	Challenger	Hard	(United Kingdom) James Ward	5–7, 4–6
Loss	5–4	Jan 2012	Honolulu, United States	Challenger	Hard	(Japan) Go Soeda	3–6, 6–7^{(5–7)}
Win	6–4	Jan 2013	USA F2, Sunrise	Futures	Clay	(Monaco) Benjamin Balleret	6–4, 6–2
Loss	6–5	Feb 2013	Dallas, United States	Challenger	Hard	(United States) Rhyne Williams	5–7, 3–6
Win	7–5	May 2014	Tallahassee, United States	Challenger	Clay	(Canada) Frank Dancevic	6–3, 6–4

=== Doubles: 1 (0–1) ===
Legend ATP Challenger (0–0) ITF Futures (0–1)	Finals by surface Hard (0–1) Clay (0–0) Grass (0–0) Carpet (0–0)

Result	W–L	Date	Tournament	Tier	Surface	Partner	Opponents	Score
Loss	0–1	Jun 2001	USA F15, Sunnyvale	Futures	Hard	(United States) Ryan Sachire	(United States) Jeff Laski (United States) Nick Rainey	3–6, 6–3, 6–7^{(4–7)}

== Performance timelines ==
Key
W	F	SF	QF	#R	RR	Q#	DNQ	A	NH

(W) winner; (F) finalist; (SF) semifinalist; (QF) quarterfinalist; (#R) rounds 4, 3, 2, 1; (RR) round-robin stage; (Q#) qualification round; (DNQ) did not qualify; (A) absent; (NH) not held; (SR) strike rate (events won / competed); (W–L) win–loss record.

=== Singles ===
Tournament	2001	2002	2003	2004	2005	2006	2007	2008	2009	2010	2011	2012	2013	2014	2015	W–L
Grand Slam tournaments
Australian Open	A	A	2R	4R	1R	2R	3R	Q1	1R	1R	A	Q1	A	A	Q1	7–7
French Open	A	1R	A	1R	1R	1R	1R	4R	1R	4R	A	Q1	Q1	1R	A	6–9
Wimbledon	A	A	1R	4R	1R	1R	1R	1R	1R	1R	A	Q1	A	A	A	3–8
US Open	2R	1R	3R	1R	SF	3R	3R	2R	2R	1R	2R	1R	Q2	A	A	15–12
Win–loss	1–1	0–2	3–3	6–4	5–4	3–4	4–4	4–3	1–4	3–4	1–1	0–1	0–0	0–1	0–0	31–36
ATP World Tour Masters 1000
Indian Wells	A	A	QF	2R	2R	2R	2R	2R	A	1R	A	2R	A	1R	A	7–9
Miami	1R	1R	QF	3R	2R	3R	1R	A	A	1R	A	A	1R	A	A	8–9
Monte Carlo	A	A	A	A	A	A	A	A	A	A	A	A	A	A	A	0–0
Rome	A	A	A	1R	A	2R	1R	A	A	A	A	A	A	A	A	1–3
Madrid	A	A	3R	2R	SF	QF	2R	3R	A	A	A	A	A	A	A	12–6
Hamburg	A	A	A	1R	A	1R	1R	A	NMS							0–3
Canada	A	A	1R	1R	A	1R	1R	2R	A	A	A	A	A	A	A	1–5
Cincinnati	A	1R	QF	1R	SF	3R	2R	2R	1R	2R	1R	LQ	LQ	2R	A	13–11
Shanghai	NMS								LQ	A	A	A	A	A	A	0–0
Paris	A	A	1R	A	3R	3R	A	1R	A	A	A	A	A	A	A	3–4
Career statistics
Titles–Finals	0–0	0–0	1–1	0–0	1–1	0–0	0–0	0–0	1–1	0–0	0–0	0–0	0–0	0–0	0–0	3–3
Year-end ranking	175	100	32	63	15	51	134	51	100	144	311	287	214	223	995	

=== Doubles ===
Tournament	2000	2001	2002	2003	2004	2005	2006	2007	2008	2009	2010	2011	SR	W–L	Win %
Grand Slam tournaments
Australian Open	A	A	A	A	A	1R	1R	A	A	1R	A	A	0 / 3	0–3	0%
French Open	A	A	A	A	1R	1R	A	1R	A	1R	A	A	0 / 4	0–4	0%
Wimbledon	A	A	A	A	1R	A	A	2R	A	A	A	A	0 / 2	1–2	33%
US Open	1R	2R	1R	2R	1R	1R	1R	1R	1R	1R	1R	1R	0 / 12	2–12	14%
Win–loss	0–1	1–1	0–1	1–1	0–3	0–3	0–2	1–3	0–1	0–3	0–1	0–1	0 / 21	3–21	13%
ATP Tour Masters 1000
Indian Wells	A	A	A	1R	A	A	1R	A	A	A	A	A	0 / 2	0–2	0%
Miami	A	Q1	A	2R	A	2R	2R	A	A	A	A	A	0 / 3	3–3	50%
Hamburg	A	A	A	A	A	A	1R	A	A	Not Masters Series			0 / 1	0–1	0%
Rome	A	A	A	A	A	A	1R	A	A	A	A	A	0 / 1	0–1	0%
Canada	A	A	A	A	A	A	1R	A	A	A	A	A	0 / 1	0–1	0%
Cincinnati	A	1R	A	A	1R	A	A	A	A	A	1R	A	0 / 3	0–3	0%
Madrid	NH		A	A	A	1R	A	A	A	A	A	A	0 / 1	0–1	0%
Win–loss	0–0	0–1	0–0	1–2	0–1	1–2	1–5	0–0	0–0	0–0	0–1	0–0	0 / 12	3–12	20%

== Top 10 wins ==
Season	2001	2002	2003	2004	2005	2006	2007	2008	2009	2010	2011	2012	2013	2014	Total
Wins	0	0	2	1	5	1	1	1	0	1	0	0	0	0	12

#	Player	Rank	Event	Surface	Rd	Score	Ginepri Rank
2003
1.	(Russia) Marat Safin	7	Indian Wells, United States	Hard	3R	6–0, 6–1	80
2.	(Germany) Rainer Schüttler	6	Madrid, Spain	Hard (i)	2R	6–2, 6–4	34
2004
3.	(Spain) Juan Carlos Ferrero	5	Wimbledon, London, United Kingdom	Grass	3R	6–3, 6–4, 6–1	34
2005
4.	(United States) Andy Roddick	4	Indianapolis, United States	Hard	QF	4–6, 7–6^{(7–2)}, 7–5	98
5.	(Argentina) Mariano Puerta	9	Cincinnati, United States	Hard	1R	7–6^{(7–2)}, 6–1	58
6.	(Russia) Marat Safin	4	Cincinnati, United States	Hard	QF	6–2, 6–3	58
7.	(Argentina) Guillermo Coria	8	US Open, New York, United States	Hard	QF	4–6, 6–1, 7–5, 3–6, 7–5	46
8.	(Russia) Nikolay Davydenko	8	Madrid, Spain	Hard (i)	3R	6–3, 7–5	21
2006
9.	(Spain) Tommy Robredo	8	Madrid, Spain	Hard (i)	3R	6–3, 7–6^{(7–3)}	47
2008
10.	(United States) James Blake	9	San Jose, United States	Hard (i)	QF	6–2, 6–2	138
11.	(Russia) Nikolay Davydenko	6	Madrid, Spain	Hard (i)	2R	4–6, 6–4, 6–4	63
2010
12.	(Sweden) Robin Söderling	8	Chennai, India	Hard	1R	6–4, 7–5	100
