= 2011 Heineken Open – Singles qualifying =

Singles qualifying
- 2011 Heineken Open

Events
Singles	Doubles
← 2010 ·	Heineken Open	· 2012 →

== Players ==
=== Seeds ===
1. (Argentina) Carlos Berlocq (moved to main draw)
2. (France) Florent Serra (second round)
3. (Spain) Pere Riba (qualifier)
4. (France) Adrian Mannarino (qualifier)
5. (Argentina) Brian Dabul (qualifying round)
6. (United States) Michael Russell (qualifier)
7. (United States) Ryan Sweeting (second round, retired)
8. (France) Benoît Paire (first round)

=== Qualifiers ===
1. (United States) Bobby Reynolds
2. (United States) Michael Russell
3. (Spain) Pere Riba
4. (France) Adrian Mannarino

== Qualifying draw ==
=== First qualifier ===
First round
1	(Argentina) Carlos Berlocq	w/o
(United States) Bobby Reynolds
(United States) Tim Smyczek	6	7
(Spain) Sergio Gutiérrez-Ferrol	3	6^{3}
(Italy) Marco Crugnola	7	7
(France) Jonathan Dasnières de Veigy	6^{9}	6^{3}
(Russia) Ilya Belyaev	6	6
8	(France) Benoît Paire	1	4

Second round
(United States) Bobby Reynolds	7	6
(United States) Tim Smyczek	6^{4}	3
(Italy) Marco Crugnola	7	6
(Russia) Ilya Belyaev	6^{6}	3

Qualifying competition
(United States) Bobby Reynolds	6	6
(Italy) Marco Crugnola	3	2

=== Second qualifier ===
First round
2	(France) Florent Serra	6
(New Zealand) Daniel King-Turner	3^{r}
(France) Ludovic Walter	6	6
WC	(New Zealand) Artem Sitak	3	4
(Italy) Alberto Brizzi	5	5
(Spain) Roberto Bautista-Agut	7	7
(Czech Republic) Dušan Lojda	4	0
6	(United States) Michael Russell	6	6

Second round
2	(France) Florent Serra	6	6^{8}	3
(France) Ludovic Walter	2	7	6
(Spain) Roberto Bautista-Agut	w/o
6	(United States) Michael Russell

Qualifying competition
(France) Ludovic Walter	3	4
6	(United States) Michael Russell	6	6

=== Third qualifier ===
First round
3	(Spain) Pere Riba	6	6
(Australia) James Lemke	2	4
(United States) Greg Ouellette	4	3
(South Africa) Raven Klaasen	6	6
WC	(New Zealand) Jose Statham	6^{3}	7	6
(Netherlands) Matwé Middelkoop	7	5	3
(Spain) Guillermo Olaso	4	4
7	(United States) Ryan Sweeting	6	6

Second round
3	(Spain) Pere Riba	5	7	6
(South Africa) Raven Klaasen	7	5	4
WC	(New Zealand) Jose Statham	3	5
7	(United States) Ryan Sweeting	6	2^{r}

Qualifying competition
3	(Spain) Pere Riba	4	6	6
WC	(New Zealand) Jose Statham	6	4	3

=== Fourth qualifier ===
First round
4	(France) Adrian Mannarino	6	6
WC	(New Zealand) Marcus Daniell	3	0
(South Africa) Izak van der Merwe	4	4
(Russia) Evgeny Donskoy	6	6
(France) Charles-Antoine Brézac	3	6	6^{5}
(Canada) Philip Bester	6	3	7
WC	(New Zealand) Mikal Statham	4	0
5	(Argentina) Brian Dabul	6	6

Second round
4	(France) Adrian Mannarino	6	2	7
(Russia) Evgeny Donskoy	3	6	6^{3}
(Canada) Philip Bester	4	6^{1}
5	(Argentina) Brian Dabul	6	7

Qualifying competition
4	(France) Adrian Mannarino	6	6
5	(Argentina) Brian Dabul	2	3
