= John Isner career statistics =

Career finals
Discipline	Type	Won	Lost	Total	WR ^{1}
Singles	Grand Slam tournaments	–	–	–	–
Singles	Year-end championships	–	–	–	–
Singles	ATP Masters 1000	1	4	5	0.20
Singles	Olympic Games	–	–	–	–
Singles	ATP Tour 500	–	3	3	0.00
Singles	ATP Tour 250	15	8	23	0.65
Singles	Total	16	15	31	0.52
Doubles	Grand Slam tournaments	–	–	–	–
Doubles	Year-end championships	–	–	–	–
Doubles	ATP Masters 1000	5	2	7	0.71
Doubles	Olympic Games	–	–	–	–
Doubles	ATP Tour 500	1	2	3	0.33
Doubles	ATP Tour 250	2	1	3	0.67
Doubles	Total	8	6	13	0.62
Total		24	21	45	0.53
^{1)} WR = Winning Rate

This is a list of main career statistics of American former professional tennis player John Isner. All statistics are according to the ATP Tour and ITF website.

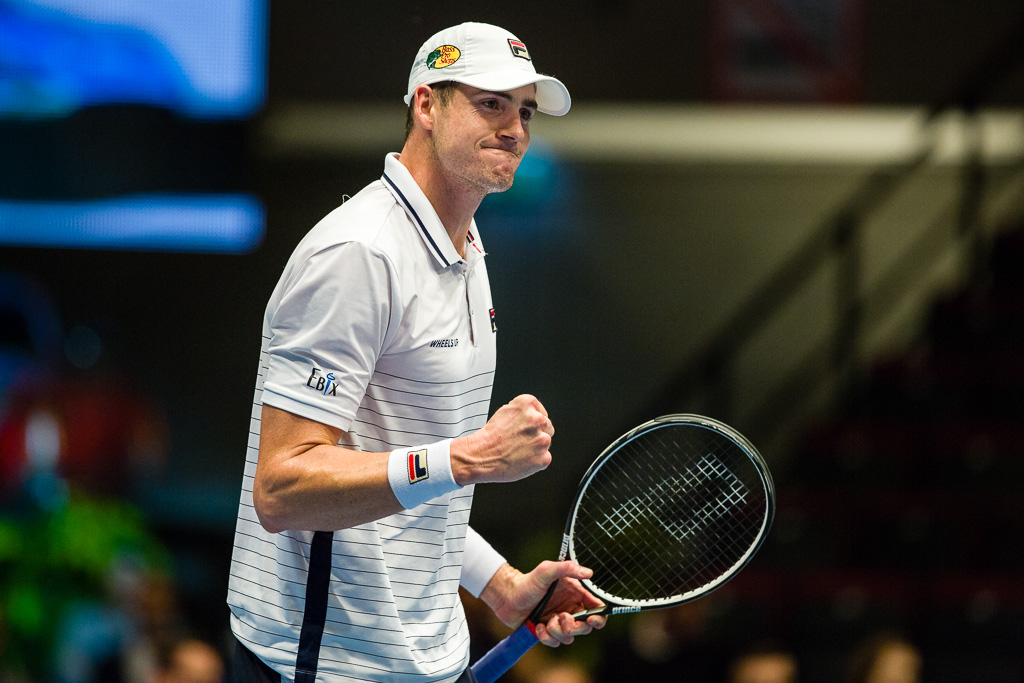
John Isner in 2016

== Performance timelines ==
Key
W	F	SF	QF	#R	RR	Q#	P#	DNQ	A	Z#	PO	G	S	B	NMS	NTI	P	NH

(W) winner; (F) finalist; (SF) semifinalist; (QF) quarterfinalist; (#R) rounds 4, 3, 2, 1; (RR) round-robin stage; (Q#) qualification round; (P#) preliminary round; (DNQ) did not qualify; (A) absent; (Z#) Davis/Fed Cup Zonal Group (with number indication) or (PO) play-off; (G) gold, (S) silver or (B) bronze Olympic/Paralympic medal; (NMS) not a Masters tournament; (NTI) not a Tier I tournament; (P) postponed; (NH) not held; (SR) strike rate (events won / competed); (W–L) win–loss record.
To avoid confusion and double counting, these charts are updated at the conclusion of a tournament or when the player's participation has ended.

=== Singles ===
Tournament	2007	2008	2009	2010	2011	2012	2013	2014	2015	2016	2017	2018	2019	2020	2021	2022	2023	SR	W–L	Win%
Grand Slam tournaments
Australian Open	A	1R	1R	4R	3R	3R	A	1R	3R	4R	2R	1R	1R	3R	A	1R	1R	0 / 14	15–14	52%
French Open	A	1R	A	3R	1R	2R	3R	4R	2R	4R	3R	4R	A	2R	3R	3R	1R	0 / 14	22–14	61%
Wimbledon	A	1R	A	2R	2R	1R	2R	3R	3R	3R	2R	SF	2R	NH^{*}	1R	3R	1R	0 / 14	18–14	56%
US Open	3R	1R	4R	3R	QF	3R	3R	3R	4R	3R	3R	QF	3R	1R	1R	2R	2R	0 / 17	32–16	67%
Win–loss	2–1	0–4	3–2	8–4	7–4	5–4	5–3	7–4	8–4	10–4	6–4	12–4	3–3	3–3	2–3	5–3	1–4	0 / 59	87–58	60%
Year-end championships
ATP Finals	did not qualify								Alt	DNQ		RR	did not qualify					0 / 1	0–3	0%
National representation
Summer Olympics (Note: 2020 Summer Olympics was postponed to 2021 due to the COVID-19 pandemic.)	NH	A	not held			QF	not held			A	not held				A	NH		0 / 1	3–1	75%
Davis Cup	A	A	A	1R	QF	SF	QF	PO	1R	QF	QF	SF	A	RR		A	A	0 / 9	15–13	54%
ATP Tour Masters 1000
Indian Wells Masters	A	2R	4R	4R	3R	F	2R	SF	4R	4R	3R	2R	4R	NH^{*}	3R	4R	1R	0 / 15	26–14	65%
Miami Open	A	1R	2R	3R	4R	3R	3R	4R	SF	2R	3R	W	F	NH^{*}	4R	2R	1R	1 / 15	26–14	65%
Monte-Carlo Masters	A	A	A	A	A	A	1R	A	3R	A	A	A	A	NH^{*}	A	A	A	0 / 2	2–2	50%
Madrid Open (Note: Held as Hamburg Masters (outdoor clay) until 2008, Madrid Masters (outdoor clay) 2009 – present.)	A	A	A	3R	2R	2R	2R	3R	QF	A	A	QF	A	NH^{*}	QF	2R	A	0 / 9	15–9	63%
Italian Open	A	A	A	2R	1R	2R	1R	1R	3R	A	SF	2R	A	A	A	2R	A	0 / 9	9–9	50%
Canadian Open	A	A	2R	A	2R	SF	1R	1R	QF	2R	1R	3R	2R	NH^{*}	SF	A	A	0 / 11	15–11	58%
Cincinnati Masters	1R	2R	2R	2R	1R	A	F	3R	1R	2R	SF	1R	2R	3R	3R	QF	1R	0 / 16	23–16	59%
Shanghai Masters (Note: Held as Madrid Masters (indoor hard) from 2002 to 2008, and Shanghai Masters (outdoor hard) 2009 – present.)	NH		1R	2R	A	3R	2R	3R	3R	1R	3R	A	3R	NH^{*}			A	0 / 9	11–9	55%
Paris Masters	A	A	2R	2R	SF	2R	3R	2R	QF	F	SF	3R	2R	A	A	2R	A	0 / 12	18–12	60%
Win–loss	0–1	2–3	7–6	8–7	9–7	11–7	9–9	12–8	20–9	9–6	15–7	10–6	11–6	2–1	12–4	8–6	0–3	1 / 98	145–96	60%
Career statistics
	2007	2008	2009	2010	2011	2012	2013	2014	2015	2016	2017	2018	2019	2020	2021	2022	2023	Career		
Tournaments (Note: Including appearances in Grand Slam and ATP World Tour main draw matches, in Summer Olympics, and not included in Davis Cup, World Team Cup, Laver Cup and the ATP Cup.)	5	19	18	21	21	21	24	23	24	20	23	22	18	7	12	16	14	308		
Titles	0	0	0	1	2	2	2	2	1	0	2	2	1	0	1	0	0	16		
Finals	1	0	0	4	3	4	4	2	2	2	2	2	2	0	1	1	1	31		
Hard win–loss	8–4	9–12	25–17	29–13	26–13	27–12	27–16	29–13	31–16	23–14	26–16	21–18	25–17	9–9	18–10	12–11	6–10	11 / 215	351–221	61%
Clay win–loss	0–0	1–3	2–1	8–10	4–7	10–7	8–5	6–5	10–6	5–5	7–4	8–5	0–0	1–1	5–2	7–4	0–2	1 / 60	82–67	55%
Grass win–loss	0–1	1–4	0–0	1–1	6–1	8–2	4–3	4–2	4–3	5–2	6–3	5–1	5–1	0–0	0–1	4–2	3–2	4 / 33	56–29	66%
Overall win–loss (Note: Including matches in Grand Slam, in ATP World Tour, in Summer Olympics, in Davis Cup, World team Cup, Laver Cup and the ATP Cup.)	8–5	11–19	27–18	38–24	36–21	45–21	39–24	39–20	45–25	33–21	39–23	34–24	30–18	10–10	23–13	23–17	9–14	16 / 308	489–317	61%
Win %	62%	37%	60%	61%	63%	68%	62%	66%	64%	61%	63%	59%	63%	50%	64%	58%	39%	61%		
Year-end ranking	106	144	34	19	18	14	14	19	11	19	17	10	19	25	24	41	173	$22,430,808		

=== Doubles ===
Tournament	2003	2007	2008	2009	2010	2011	2012	2013	2014	2015	2016	2017	2018	2019	2020	2021	2022	2023	SR	W–L	Win %
Grand Slam tournaments
Australian Open	A	A	1R	QF	3R	A	A	A	A	A	A	A	A	A	A	A	A	1R	0 / 4	5–4	63%
French Open	A	A	3R	A	A	1R	A	A	A	A	A	A	A	A	A	A	A	A	0 / 2	2–2	50%
Wimbledon	A	A	A	A	A	A	A	A	A	A	A	A	A	A	NH^{*}	A	A	1R	0 / 1	0–1	0%
US Open	1R	1R	1R	2R	A	A	A	A	A	A	A	A	A	A	A	A	A	1R	0 / 5	1–5	16%
Win–loss	0–1	0–1	2–3	4–2	2–1	0–1	0–0	0–0	0–0	0–0	0–0	0–0	0–0	0–0	0–0	0–0	0–0	0–3	0 / 12	8–12	40%
National representation
Summer Olympics	NH		A	not held			1R	not held			A	not held				A	NH		0 / 1	0–1	0%
Davis Cup	A	A	A	A	1R	QF	SF	QF	PO	1R	QF	QF	SF	A	RR		A	A	0 / 9	2–0	100%
ATP Tour Masters 1000
Indian Wells Masters	A	A	A	A	SF	2R	F	2R	SF	2R	2R	1R	W	1R	NH^{*}	2R	W	SF	2 / 13	27–10	73%
Miami Open	A	A	A	A	2R	2R	A	1R	A	SF	QF	2R	2R	QF	NH^{*}	2R	W	A	1 / 10	16–9	64%
Monte-Carlo Masters	A	A	A	A	A	A	A	A	A	A	A	A	A	A	NH^{*}	A	A	A	0 / 0	0–0	–
Madrid Open	A	A	A	A	2R	SF	1R	2R	2R	A	A	A	1R	A	NH^{*}	A	SF	A	0 / 7	9–6	60%
Italian Open	A	A	A	A	F	W	1R	1R	1R	1R	A	QF	2R	A	A	A	F	A	1 / 9	15–8	65%
Canadian Open	A	A	A	A	A	A	A	A	A	A	2R	A	A	1R	NH^{*}	A	A	A	0 / 2	1–2	33%
Cincinnati Masters	A	2R	QF	2R	2R	1R	A	A	A	A	A	1R	A	A	2R	A	1R	A	0 / 8	6–7	46%
Shanghai Masters	not held			1R	1R	A	A	A	A	2R	W	1R	A	2R	NH^{*}			A	1 / 6	7–4	64%
Paris Masters	A	A	A	A	2R	1R	1R	2R	1R	1R	A	1R	QF	A	A	A	A	A	0 / 8	4–7	36%
Win–loss	0–0	1–1	2–1	1–2	11–6	9–5	4–4	3–5	4–2	5–5	9–3	3–5	8–4	3–4	1–1	2–2	17–3	3–1	5 / 63	85–53	62%
Career statistics
	2003	2007	2008	2009	2010	2011	2012	2013	2014	2015	2016	2017	2018	2019	2020	2021	2022	2023	Career		
Tournaments	1	4	11	10	14	13	9	8	6	8	7	11	5	6	2	3	6	4	128		
Titles	0	0	1	0	1	1	0	0	0	0	1	0	1	0	0	1	2	0	8		
Finals	0	0	1	0	2	2	1	0	0	0	1	2	1	0	0	1	3	0	14		
Overall win–loss	0–1	2–4	10–10	9–9	23–11	18–11	7–9	4–8	5–4	6–8	9–5	10–10	9–4	5–6	1–2	7–2	23–6	3–4	151–114		
Win %	0%	33%	50%	50%	68%	62%	44%	33%	56%	43%	64%	50%	69%	45%	33%	78%	79%	43%	57%		
Year-end ranking	1383	226	106	97	31	36	94	193	170	122	54	100	59	182	184	206	20	192			

^{*} not held due to COVID-19 pandemic.

== Significant finals ==
=== Masters 1000 finals ===
==== Singles: 5 (1 title, 4 runner-ups) ====
Result	Year	Tournament	Surface	Opponent	Score
Loss	2012	Indian Wells Masters	Hard	(Switzerland) Roger Federer	6–7^{(7–9)}, 3–6
Loss	2013	Cincinnati Masters	Hard	(Spain) Rafael Nadal	6–7^{(8–10)}, 6–7^{(3–7)}
Loss	2016	Paris Masters	Hard (i)	(United Kingdom) Andy Murray	3–6, 7–6^{(7–4)}, 4–6
Win	2018	Miami Open	Hard	(Germany) Alexander Zverev	6–7^{(4–7)}, 6–4, 6–4
Loss	2019	Miami Open	Hard	(Switzerland) Roger Federer	1–6, 4–6

==== Doubles: 8 (5 titles, 3 runner-ups) ====
Result	Year	Tournament	Surface	Partner	Opponents	Score
Loss	2010	Italian Open	Clay	(United States) Sam Querrey	(United States) Bob Bryan (United States) Mike Bryan	3–6, 2–6
Win	2011	Italian Open	Clay	(United States) Sam Querrey	(United States) Mardy Fish (United States) Andy Roddick	w/o
Loss	2012	Indian Wells Masters	Hard	(United States) Sam Querrey	(Spain) Rafael Nadal (Spain) Marc López	2–6, 6–7^{(3–7)}
Win	2016	Shanghai Masters	Hard	(United States) Jack Sock	(Finland) Henri Kontinen (Australia) John Peers	6–4, 6–4
Win	2018	Indian Wells Masters	Hard	(United States) Jack Sock	(United States) Bob Bryan (United States) Mike Bryan	7–6^{(7–4)}, 7–6^{(7–2)}
Win	2022	Indian Wells Masters	Hard	(United States) Jack Sock	(Mexico) Santiago González (France) Édouard Roger-Vasselin	7–6^{(7–4)}, 6–3
Win	2022	Miami Open	Hard	(Poland) Hubert Hurkacz	(Netherlands) Wesley Koolhof (United Kingdom) Neal Skupski	7–6^{(7–5)}, 6–4
Loss	2022	Italian Open	Clay	(Argentina) Diego Schwartzman	(Croatia) Nikola Mektić (Croatia) Mate Pavić	2–6, 7–6^{(8–6)}, [10–12]

== ATP career finals ==
=== Singles: 31 (16 titles, 15 runner-ups) ===
Legend Grand Slam tournaments (0–0) ATP World Tour Finals (0–0) ATP World Tour Masters 1000 (1–4) ATP World Tour 500 Series (0–3) ATP World Tour 250 Series (15–8)	Finals by surface Hard (11–12) Clay (1–3) Grass (4–0)	Finals by setting Outdoor (16–12) Indoor (0–3)

Result	W–L	Date	Tournament	Tier	Surface	Opponent	Score
Loss	0–1	Aug 2007	Washington Open, United States	International	Hard	(United States) Andy Roddick	4–6, 6–7^{(4–7)}
Win	1–1	Jan 2010	Auckland Open, New Zealand	250 Series	Hard	(France) Arnaud Clément	6–3, 5–7, 7–6^{(7–2)}
Loss	1–2	Feb 2010	US National Indoor, United States	500 Series	Hard (i)	(United States) Sam Querrey	7–6^{(7–3)}, 6–7^{(5–7)}, 3–6
Loss	1–3	May 2010	Serbia Open, Serbia	250 Series	Clay	(United States) Sam Querrey	6–3, 6–7^{(4–7)}, 4–6
Loss	1–4	Jul 2010	Atlanta Open, United States	250 Series	Hard	(United States) Mardy Fish	6–4, 4–6, 6–7^{(4–7)}
Win	2–4	Jul 2011	Hall of Fame Open, United States	250 Series	Grass	(Belgium) Olivier Rochus	6–3, 7–6^{(8–6)}
Loss	2–5	Aug 2011	Atlanta Open, United States	250 Series	Hard	(United States) Mardy Fish	6–3, 6–7^{(6–8)}, 2–6
Win	3–5	Aug 2011	Winston-Salem Open, United States	250 Series	Hard	(France) Julien Benneteau	4–6, 6–3, 6–4
Loss	3–6	Mar 2012	Indian Wells Masters, United States	Masters 1000	Hard	(Switzerland) Roger Federer	6–7^{(7–9)}, 3–6
Loss	3–7	Apr 2012	U.S. Men's Clay Court Championships, United States	250 Series	Clay	(Argentina) Juan Mónaco	2–6, 6–3, 3–6
Win	4–7	Jul 2012	Hall of Fame Open, United States (2)	250 Series	Grass	(Australia) Lleyton Hewitt	7–6^{(7–1)}, 6–4
Win	5–7	Aug 2012	Winston-Salem Open, United States (2)	250 Series	Hard	(Czech Republic) Tomáš Berdych	3–6, 6–4, 7–6^{(11–9)}
Win	6–7	Apr 2013	U.S. Men's Clay Court Championships, United States	250 Series	Clay	(Spain) Nicolás Almagro	6–3, 7–5
Win	7–7	Jul 2013	Atlanta Open, United States	250 Series	Hard	(South Africa) Kevin Anderson	6–7^{(3–7)}, 7–6^{(7–2)}, 7–6^{(7–2)}
Loss	7–8	Aug 2013	Washington Open, United States	500 Series	Hard	(Argentina) Juan Martín del Potro	6–3, 1–6, 2–6
Loss	7–9	Aug 2013	Cincinnati Masters, United States	Masters 1000	Hard	(Spain) Rafael Nadal	6–7^{(8–10)}, 6–7^{(3–7)}
Win	8–9	Jan 2014	Auckland Open, New Zealand (2)	250 Series	Hard	(Chinese Taipei) Lu Yen-hsun	7–6^{(7–4)}, 7–6^{(9–7)}
Win	9–9	Jul 2014	Atlanta Open, United States (2)	250 Series	Hard	(Israel) Dudi Sela	6–3, 6–4
Win	10–9	Jul 2015	Atlanta Open, United States (3)	250 Series	Hard	(Cyprus) Marcos Baghdatis	6–3, 6–3
Loss	10–10	Aug 2015	Washington Open, United States	500 Series	Hard	(Japan) Kei Nishikori	6–4, 4–6, 4–6
Loss	10–11	Aug 2016	Atlanta Open, United States	250 Series	Hard	(Australia) Nick Kyrgios	6–7^{(3–7)}, 6–7^{(4–7)}
Loss	10–12	Nov 2016	Paris Masters, France	Masters 1000	Hard (i)	(United Kingdom) Andy Murray	3–6, 7–6^{(7–4)}, 4–6
Win	11–12	Jul 2017	Hall of Fame Open, United States (3)	250 Series	Grass	(Australia) Matthew Ebden	6–3, 7–6^{(7–4)}
Win	12–12	Jul 2017	Atlanta Open, United States (4)	250 Series	Hard	(United States) Ryan Harrison	7–6^{(8–6)}, 7–6^{(9–7)}
Win	13–12	Apr 2018	Miami Open, United States	Masters 1000	Hard	(Germany) Alexander Zverev	6–7^{(4–7)}, 6–4, 6–4
Win	14–12	Jul 2018	Atlanta Open, United States (5)	250 Series	Hard	(United States) Ryan Harrison	5–7, 6–3, 6–4
Loss	14–13	Apr 2019	Miami Open, United States	Masters 1000	Hard	(Switzerland) Roger Federer	1–6, 4–6
Win	15–13	Jul 2019	Hall of Fame Open, United States (4)	250 Series	Grass	(Kazakhstan) Alexander Bublik	7–6^{(7–2)}, 6–3
Win	16–13	Jul 2021	Atlanta Open, United States (6)	250 Series	Hard	(United States) Brandon Nakashima	7–6^{(10–8)}, 7–5
Loss	16–14	Apr 2022	U.S. Men's Clay Court Championships, United States	250 Series	Clay	(United States) Reilly Opelka	3–6, 6–7^{(7–9)}
Loss	16–15	Feb 2023	Dallas Open, United States	250 Series	Hard (i)	(China) Wu Yibing	7–6^{(7–4)}, 6–7^{(3–7)}, 6–7^{(12–14)}

=== Doubles: 14 (8 titles, 6 runner-ups) ===
Legend Grand Slam tournaments (0–0) ATP Tour Finals (0–0) ATP Tour Masters 1000 (5–3) ATP Tour 500 Series (1–2) ATP Tour 250 Series (2–1)	Finals by surface Hard (6–3) Clay (1–3) Grass (1–0)	Finals by setting Outdoor (7–6) Indoor (1–0)

Result	W–L	Date	Tournament	Tier	Surface	Partner	Opponents	Score
Win	1–0	Jul 2008	Hall of Fame Open, United States	International	Grass	(United States) Mardy Fish	(India) Rohan Bopanna (Pakistan) Aisam-ul-Haq Qureshi	6–4, 7–6^{(7–1)}
Win	2–0	Feb 2010	US National Indoor, United States	500 Series	Hard (i)	(United States) Sam Querrey	(United Kingdom) Ross Hutchins (Australia) Jordan Kerr	6–4, 6–4
Loss	2–1	May 2010	Italian Open, Italy	Masters 1000	Clay	(United States) Sam Querrey	(United States) Bob Bryan (United States) Mike Bryan	2–6, 3–6
Loss	2–2	Apr 2011	U.S. Men's Clay Court Championships, United States	250 Series	Clay	(United States) Sam Querrey	(United States) Bob Bryan (United States) Mike Bryan	7–6^{(7–4)}, 2–6, [5–10]
Win	3–2	May 2011	Italian Open, Italy	Masters 1000	Clay	(United States) Sam Querrey	(United States) Mardy Fish (United States) Andy Roddick	Walkover
Loss	3–3	Mar 2012	Indian Wells Masters, United States	Masters 1000	Hard	(United States) Sam Querrey	(Spain) Marc López (Spain) Rafael Nadal	2–6, 6–7^{(3–7)}
Win	4–3	Oct 2016	Shanghai Masters, China	Masters 1000	Hard	(United States) Jack Sock	(Finland) Henri Kontinen (Australia) John Peers	6–4, 6–4
Loss	4–4	Mar 2017	Mexican Open, Mexico	500 Series	Hard	(Spain) Feliciano López	(United Kingdom) Jamie Murray (Brazil) Bruno Soares	3–6, 3–6
Loss	4–5	Oct 2017	China Open, China	500 Series	Hard	(United States) Jack Sock	(Finland) Henri Kontinen (Australia) John Peers	3–6, 6–3, [7–10]
Win	5–5	Mar 2018	Indian Wells Masters, United States	Masters 1000	Hard	(United States) Jack Sock	(United States) Bob Bryan (United States) Mike Bryan	7–6^{(7–4)}, 7–6^{(7–2)}
Win	6–5	Jul 2021	Los Cabos Open, Mexico	250 Series	Hard	(Mexico) Hans Hach Verdugo	(United States) Hunter Reese (Netherlands) Sem Verbeek	5–7, 6–2, [10–4]
Win	7–5	Mar 2022	Indian Wells Masters, United States (2)	Masters 1000	Hard	(United States) Jack Sock	(Mexico) Santiago González (France) Édouard Roger-Vasselin	7–6^{(7–4)}, 6–3
Win	8–5	Apr 2022	Miami Open, United States	Masters 1000	Hard	(Poland) Hubert Hurkacz	(Netherlands) Wesley Koolhof (United Kingdom) Neal Skupski	7–6^{(7–5)}, 6–4
Loss	8–6	May 2022	Italian Open, Italy	Masters 1000	Clay	(Argentina) Diego Schwartzman	(Croatia) Nikola Mektić (Croatia) Mate Pavić	2–6, 7–6^{(8–6)}, [10–12]

== Other finals ==
=== Team competition: 2 (1 title, 1 runner-up) ===
Outcome	W–L	Date	Team competition	Surface	Partner/team	Opponents	Score
Win	1–0	Jan 2011	Hopman Cup, Perth	Hard	(United States) Bethanie Mattek-Sands	(Belgium) Justine Henin (Belgium) Ruben Bemelmans	2–1
Loss	1–1	Jan 2015	Hopman Cup, Perth	Hard	(United States) Serena Williams	(Poland) Agnieszka Radwańska (Poland) Jerzy Janowicz	1–2

== Wins over top 10 players ==
- Isner had a 29–80 record against players who were, at the time the match was played, ranked in the top 10.

Season	2007	2008	2009	2010	2011	2012	2013	2014	2015	2016	2017	2018	2019	2020	2021	2022	2023	Total
Wins	0	0	3	1	1	6	3	0	3	1	4	3	1	0	2	1	0	29

#	Player	Rank	Event	Surface	Rd	Score	JIR
2009
1.	(France) Gaël Monfils	9	Indian Wells, United States	Hard	2R	6–7^{(5–7)}, 6–1, 6–4	147
2.	(France) Jo-Wilfried Tsonga	7	Washington, United States	Hard	2R	4–6, 7–6^{(7–2)}, 7–6^{(7–4)}	80
3.	(United States) Andy Roddick	5	US Open, New York, United States	Hard	3R	7–6^{(7–3)}, 6–3, 3–6, 5–7, 7–6^{(7–5)}	55
2010
4.	(Russia) Nikolay Davydenko	6	Beijing, China	Hard	QF	7–6^{(7–2)}, 6–4	22
2011
5.	(Spain) David Ferrer	5	Paris, France	Hard (i)	QF	6–3, 3–6, 6–3	25
2012
6.	(Switzerland) Roger Federer	3	Davis Cup, Fribourg, Switzerland	Clay (i)	RR	4–6, 6–3, 7–6^{(7–4)}, 6–2	17
7.	(Serbia) Novak Djokovic	1	Indian Wells, United States	Hard	SF	7–6^{(9–7)}, 3–6, 7–6^{(7–5)}	11
8.	(France) Jo-Wilfried Tsonga	6	Davis Cup, Roquebrune-Cap-Martin, France	Clay	RR	6–3, 7–6^{(7–4)}, 5–7, 6–3	11
9.	(Serbia) Janko Tipsarević	8	Olympics, London, United Kingdom	Grass	3R	7–5, 7–6^{(16–14)}	11
10.	(France) Jo-Wilfried Tsonga	6	Winston-Salem, United States	Hard	SF	6–4, 3–6, 7–6^{(7–3)}	10
11.	(Czech Republic) Tomáš Berdych	7	Winston-Salem, United States	Hard	F	3–6, 6–4, 7–6^{(11–9)}	10
2013
12.	(Canada) Milos Raonic	10	Cincinnati, United States	Hard	3R	7–6^{(7–5)}, 6–4	22
13.	(Serbia) Novak Djokovic	1	Cincinnati, United States	Hard	QF	7–6^{(7–5)}, 3–6, 7–5	22
14.	(Argentina) Juan Martín del Potro	7	Cincinnati, United States	Hard	SF	6–7^{(5–7)}, 7–6^{(11–9)}, 6–3	22
2015
15.	(Canada) Milos Raonic	6	Miami, United States	Hard	4R	6–7^{(3–7)}, 7–6^{(8–6)}, 7–6^{(7–5)}	24
16.	(Japan) Kei Nishikori	5	Miami, United States	Hard	QF	6–4, 6–3	24
17.	(Switzerland) Roger Federer	2	Paris, France	Hard (i)	3R	7–6^{(7–3)}, 3–6, 7–6^{(7–5)}	13
2016
18.	(Croatia) Marin Čilić	10	Paris, France	Hard (i)	SF	6–4, 6–3	27
2017
19.	(Switzerland) Stan Wawrinka	3	Rome, Italy	Clay	3R	7–6^{(7–1)}, 6–4	24
20.	(Croatia) Marin Čilić	8	Rome, Italy	Clay	QF	7–6^{(7–3)}, 2–6, 7–6^{(7–2)}	24
21.	(Spain) Rafael Nadal	1	Laver Cup, Prague, Czech Republic	Hard (i)	RR	7–5, 7–6^{(7–1)}	17
22.	(Bulgaria) Grigor Dimitrov	8	Paris, France	Hard (i)	3R	7–6^{(12–10)}, 5–7, 7–6^{(7–3)}	14
2018
23.	(Croatia) Marin Čilić	3	Miami, United States	Hard	4R	7–6^{(7–0)}, 6–3	17
24.	(Argentina) Juan Martín del Potro	6	Miami, United States	Hard	SF	6–1, 7–6^{(7–2)}	17
25.	(Germany) Alexander Zverev	5	Miami, United States	Hard	F	6–7^{(4–7)}, 6–4, 6–4	17
2019
26.	(Germany) Alexander Zverev	6	Laver Cup, Geneva, Switzerland	Hard (i)	RR	6–7^{(2–7)}, 6–4, [10–1]	20
2021
27.	(Russia) Andrey Rublev	7	Madrid, Spain	Clay	3R	7–6^{(7–4)}, 3–6, 7–6^{(7–4)}	39
28.	(Russia) Andrey Rublev	7	Toronto, Canada	Hard	3R	7–5, 7–6^{(7–5)}	30
2022
29.	(Poland) Hubert Hurkacz	10	Cincinnati, United States	Hard	2R	7–6^{(7–5)}, 6–7^{(5–7)}, 6–2	50

== See also ==
- List of ATP Tour top-level tournament singles champions
- List of Tennis Masters Series doubles champions
- Longest tennis match records
- Longest tiebreaker in tennis
- United States Davis Cup team
- List of United States Davis Cup team representatives
- Fastest recorded tennis serves
