= 2013 U.S. Men's Clay Court Championships =

Tennis tournament

- Date: April 8–14
- Edition: 45th
- Category: World Tour 250
- Draw: 28S / 16D
- Prize money: $455,775
- Surface: Clay
- Location: Houston, TX, United States
- Venue: River Oaks Country Club

Champions

Singles
- (United States) John Isner

Doubles
- (United Kingdom) Jamie Murray / (Australia) John Peers
- U.S. Men's Clay Court Championships

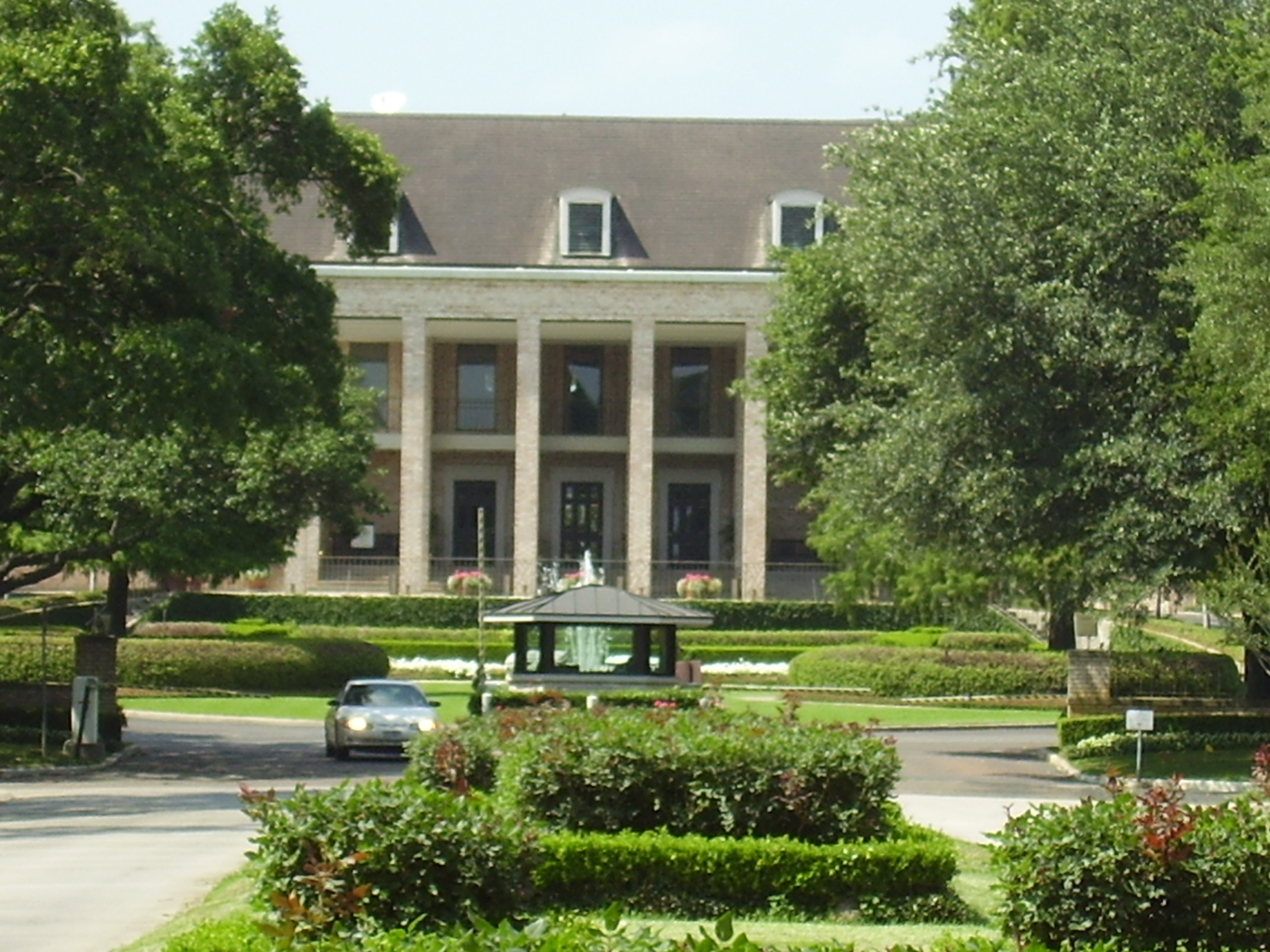
River Oaks Country Club

The 2013 U.S. Men's Clay Court Championships was a men's tennis tournament played on outdoor clay courts. It was part of the 2013 ATP World Tour. It was the 45th edition of the U.S. Men's Clay Court Championships, and an ATP World Tour 250 event. It took place at River Oaks Country Club in Houston, Texas, United States, from April 8 through April 14, 2013. Fifth-seeded John Isner won the singles title.

== Finals ==
=== Singles ===
(United States) John Isner defeated (Spain) Nicolás Almagro, 6–3, 7–5

- It was Isners'1st singles title of the year and the 6th of his career.

=== Doubles ===
(United Kingdom) Jamie Murray / (Australia) John Peers defeated (United States) Bob Bryan / (United States) Mike Bryan, 1–6, 7–6^{(7–3)}, [12–10]

== Singles main draw entrants ==
=== Seeds ===
Country	Player	Rank^{1}	Seed
ESP	Nicolás Almagro	12	1
GER	Tommy Haas	14	2
ARG	Juan Mónaco	19	3
USA	Sam Querrey	20	4
USA	John Isner	23	5
ESP	Fernando Verdasco	30	6
ITA	Paolo Lorenzi	57	7
USA	Michael Russell	73	8

- Rankings and seedings are as of April 1, 2013.

=== Other entrants ===
The following players received wildcards into the main draw:

- (United States) Steve Johnson
- (United States) Jack Sock
- (United States) Rhyne Williams

The following players received entry via the qualifying draw:

- (Argentina) Facundo Argüello
- (United States) Robby Ginepri
- (United States) Bradley Klahn
- (Austria) Gerald Melzer

The following player received entry as a lucky loser:

- (Croatia) Ivo Karlović

=== Withdrawals ===
Before the tournament

- (Argentina) Carlos Berlocq
- (Argentina) Leonardo Mayer
- (United States) Sam Querrey

== Doubles main draw entrants ==
=== Seeds ===
Country	Player	Country	Player	Rank^{1}	Seed
USA	Bob Bryan	USA	Mike Bryan	2	1
MEX	Santiago González	USA	Scott Lipsky	61	2
PHI	Treat Conrad Huey	GBR	Dominic Inglot	65	3
USA	Eric Butorac	ISR	Jonathan Erlich	99	4

- Rankings are as of April 1, 2013.

=== Other entrants ===
The following pairs received wildcards into the doubles main draw:

- (United States) Steve Johnson / (United States) Jack Sock
- (Spain) Fernando Verdasco / (Germany) Mischa Zverev
