= 2008 Heineken Open =

- Date: 5–13 January
- Edition: 33rd
- Category: ATP International Series
- Draw: 32S / 16D
- Prize money: $439,000
- Location: Auckland, New Zealand
- Venue: ASB Tennis Centre

Champions

Singles
- (Germany) Philipp Kohlschreiber

Doubles
- (Peru) Luis Horna / (Argentina) Juan Mónaco
← 2007 ·	ATP Auckland Open	· 2009 →

The 2008 Heineken Open was a men's tennis tournament played on outdoor hard courts. It was the 33rd edition of the event known that year as the Heineken Open, and was part of the ATP International Series of the 2008 ATP Tour. It took place at the ASB Tennis Centre in Auckland, New Zealand, from 5 January through 13 January 2008. Seventh-seeded Philipp Kohlschreiber won the singles title.

The field was led by Association of Tennis Professionals (ATP) No. 5, Tennis Masters Cup finalist and defending champion David Ferrer, US Open quarterfinalist Juan Ignacio Chela, and 2007 Stockholm quarterfinalist Juan Mónaco. Other top seeds competing were 2007 Vienna semifinalist Juan Carlos Ferrero, recent Adelaide runner-up Jarkko Nieminen, Nicolás Almagro, Philipp Kohlschreiber and Albert Montañés.

== Finals ==
=== Singles ===
(Germany) Philipp Kohlschreiber defeated (Spain) Juan Carlos Ferrero 7–6^{(7–4)}, 7–5

- It was Philipp Kohlschreiber's 1st title of the year, and his 2nd overall.

=== Doubles ===
(Peru) Luis Horna / (Argentina) Juan Mónaco defeated (Belgium) Xavier Malisse / (Austria) Jürgen Melzer 6–4, 3–6, [10–7]

== See also ==
- 2008 ASB Classic – women's tournament
