= 2009 Heineken Open – Singles =

Singles
- 2009 Heineken Open

Final
- Champion: (Argentina) Juan Martín del Potro
- Runner-up: (United States) Sam Querrey
- Score: 6–4, 6–4

Details
- Draw: 28 (4 Q / 3 WC )
- Seeds: 8

Events
Singles	Doubles
← 2008 ·	ATP Auckland Open	· 2010 →

Philipp Kohlschreiber was the defending champion, but withdrew in the quarterfinals due to a shoulder injury.

In the final, Juan Martín del Potro defeated Sam Querrey, 6–4, 6–4.

== Seeds ==
1. (Argentina) Juan Martín del Potro (champion)
2. (Spain) David Ferrer (semifinals)
3. (Sweden) Robin Söderling (semifinals)
4. (Spain) Nicolás Almagro (quarterfinals)
5. (Germany) Philipp Kohlschreiber (quarterfinals, withdrew due to a shoulder injury)
6. (United States) Sam Querrey (final)
7. (Spain) Albert Montañés (first round)
8. (Argentina) Juan Mónaco (second round)

== Draw ==
=== Key ===
- Q = Qualifier
- WC = Wild card
- LL = Lucky loser
- Alt = Alternate
- SE = Special exempt
- PR = Protected ranking
- ITF = ITF entry
- JE = Junior exempt
- w/o = Walkover
- r = Retired
- d = Defaulted
- SR = Special ranking

=== Finals ===
Semifinals
1	(Argentina) Juan Martín del Potro	6	6
3	(Sweden) Robin Söderling	4	3
6	(United States) Sam Querrey	3	6	7^{7}
2	(Spain) David Ferrer	6	3	6^{4}

Final
1	(Argentina) Juan Martín del Potro	6	6
6	(United States) Sam Querrey	4	4

=== Top half ===
First round
(Latvia) E Gulbis	6	6^{5}	6
(Spain) M Granollers	4	7^{7}	1
(Serbia) V Troicki	6	6
(Russia) I Kunitsyn	1	2
(Romania) V Hănescu	3	4
8	(Argentina) J Mónaco	6	6
Q	(Spain) Ó Hernández	6^{4}	7	2
Q	(United States) B Reynolds	7^{7}	5	6
WC	(New Zealand) J Statham	2	3
(United States) R Ginepri	6	6
Q	(United States) J Isner	7	7^{7}
7	(Spain) A Montañés	6^{4}	5

Second round
1	(Argentina) JM del Potro	4	6	6
(Latvia) E Gulbis	6	4	1
(Serbia) V Troicki	3	6	6
8	(Argentina) J Mónaco	6	4	2
3	(Sweden) R Söderling	6	4	6
Q	(United States) B Reynolds	3	6	2
(United States) R Ginepri	4	7^{7}	6^{5}
Q	(United States) J Isner	6	6^{1}	7^{7}

Quarterfinals
1	(Argentina) JM del Potro	6	6
(Serbia) V Troicki	3	2
3	(Sweden) R Söderling	6	6
Q	(United States) J Isner	4	4

Semifinals
1	(Argentina) JM del Potro	6	6
3	(Sweden) R Söderling	4	3

=== Bottom half ===
First round
6	(United States) S Querrey	6	7
WC	(New Zealand) D King-Turner	4	5
(France) F Serra	3	4
Q	(Luxembourg) G Müller	6	6
(Belgium) S Darcis	6^{5}	2
(Chinese Taipei) Y-h Lu	7^{7}	6
5	(Germany) P Kohlschreiber	6	6
WC	(Slovakia) D Hrbatý	1	2
(Spain) JC Ferrero	5
(Japan) K Nishikori	3^{r}
(Argentina) A Calleri	6	4	4
(France) M Gicquel	3	6	6

Second round
6	(United States) S Querrey	3	6	6
Q	(Luxembourg) G Müller	6	3	4
(Chinese Taipei) Y-h Lu	7^{7}	3	2
4	(Spain) N Almagro	6^{4}	6	6
5	(Germany) P Kohlschreiber	6	4	7^{7}
(Spain) JC Ferrero	4	6	6^{5}
(France) M Gicquel	7^{7}	4	4
2	(Spain) D Ferrer	6^{3}	6	6

Quarterfinals
6	(United States) S Querrey	6	6
4	(Spain) N Almagro	3	2
5	(Germany) P Kohlschreiber
2	(Spain) D Ferrer	w/o

Semifinals
6	(United States) S Querrey	3	6	7^{7}
2	(Spain) D Ferrer	6	3	6^{4}

== Qualifying ==
=== Seeds ===
1. (Italy) ~~Philipp Petzschner~~ (withdrew, due to illness)
2. (Spain) Óscar Hernández (qualified)
3. (United States) Bobby Reynolds (qualified)
4. (Spain) Iván Navarro (second round)
5. (Chile) Nicolás Massú (first round)
6. (Argentina) Diego Junqueira (second round)
7. (United States) Vince Spadea (second round)
8. (Brazil) Thomaz Bellucci (qualifying competition)

=== Qualifiers ===
1. (Luxembourg) Gilles Müller
2. (Spain) Óscar Hernández
3. (United States) Bobby Reynolds
4. (United States) John Isner

=== Draw ===
==== First qualifier ====
First round
Alt	(France) Benoît Paire	4	6	6
(Czech Republic) Jaroslav Pospíšil	6	1	2
WC	(New Zealand) Adam Thompson	7^{7}	3	4
(India) Rohan Bopanna	6^{5}	6	6
WC	(New Zealand) Marcus Daniell	3	2
(Spain) Daniel Gimeno Traver	6	6
(Luxembourg) Gilles Müller	6	6
5	(Chile) Nicolás Massú	3	3

Second round
Alt	(France) Benoît Paire	7	3	2
(India) Rohan Bopanna	5	6	6
(Spain) Daniel Gimeno Traver	4	6	2
(Luxembourg) Gilles Müller	6	2	6

Qualifying competition
(India) Rohan Bopanna	3	2
(Luxembourg) Gilles Müller	6	6

==== Second qualifier ====
First round
2	(Spain) Óscar Hernández	6^{9}	6	6
(Italy) Francesco Piccari	7^{11}	2	3
(New Zealand) G.D. Jones	6	6
(Spain) Miguel Ángel López Jaén	2	1
(Australia) Colin Ebelthite	5	6	6
(Belgium) Niels Desein	7	2	2
(France) Mathieu Rodrigues	5	2
7	(United States) Vince Spadea	7	6

Second round
2	(Spain) Óscar Hernández	7^{7}	6
(New Zealand) G.D. Jones	6^{3}	3
(Australia) Colin Ebelthite	1	7	6
7	(United States) Vince Spadea	6	5	1

Qualifying competition
2	(Spain) Óscar Hernández	7	3	6
(Australia) Colin Ebelthite	5	6	2

==== Third qualifier ====
First round
3	(United States) Bobby Reynolds	4	6	6
(Germany) Alexander Flock	6	3	4
(Australia) Sam Groth	6	6
(Moldova) Roman Borvanov	3	4
(United States) Nathan Thompson	6^{6}	6^{5}
(Netherlands) Matwé Middelkoop	7^{8}	7^{7}
WC	(New Zealand) Mikal Statham	1	6^{1}
6	(Argentina) Diego Junqueira	6	7^{7}

Second round
3	(United States) Bobby Reynolds	7	6^{2}	6
(Australia) Sam Groth	5	7^{7}	4
(Netherlands) Matwé Middelkoop	6	6
6	(Argentina) Diego Junqueira	1	1

Qualifying competition
3	(United States) Bobby Reynolds	6	6
(Netherlands) Matwé Middelkoop	4	2

==== Fourth qualifier ====
First round
4	(Spain) Iván Navarro	6	7^{7}
(France) Jonathan Dasnières de Veigy	3	6^{3}
(Switzerland) Michael Lammer	6^{5}	7^{7}	3
(United States) John Isner	7^{7}	6^{5}	6
(Belgium) Ruben Bemelmans	6	6
(Spain) Pablo Andújar	3	2
WC	(New Zealand) Finn Tearney	3	0
8	(Brazil) Thomaz Bellucci	6	6

Second round
4	(Spain) Iván Navarro	7^{7}	4	5
(United States) John Isner	6^{4}	6	7
(Belgium) Ruben Bemelmans	1	3
8	(Brazil) Thomaz Bellucci	6	6

Qualifying competition
(United States) John Isner	6	5	7^{7}
8	(Brazil) Thomaz Bellucci	3	7	6^{3}
