= 2008 Heineken Open – Doubles =

Doubles
- 2008 Heineken Open

Final
- Champions: (Peru) Luis Horna (Argentina) Juan Mónaco
- Runners-up: (Belgium) Xavier Malisse (Austria) Jürgen Melzer
- Score: 6–4, 3–6, [10–7]

Details
- Draw: 16
- Seeds: 4

Events
Singles	Doubles
← 2007 ·	ATP Auckland Open	· 2009 →

Jeff Coetzee and Rogier Wassen were the defending champions. They were both present but did not compete together.
Coetzee partnered with Jaroslav Levinský, but lost in the semifinals to Xavier Malisse and Jürgen Melzer.
Wassen partnered with Christopher Kas, but lost in the first round to Jeff Coetzee and Jaroslav Levinský.

Luis Horna and Juan Mónaco won in the final 6–4, 3–6, [10–7], against Xavier Malisse and Jürgen Melzer.

== Seeds ==
1. (France) Julien Benneteau / (France) Michaël Llodra (withdrew due to a shoulder injury for Llodra)
2. (Brazil) Marcelo Melo / (Brazil) André Sá (first round)
3. (Australia) Jordan Kerr / (Australia) Todd Perry (first round)
4. (Germany) Christopher Kas / (Netherlands) Rogier Wassen (first round)

== Draw ==
=== Key ===
- Q = Qualifier
- WC = Wild card
- LL = Lucky loser
- Alt = Alternate
- SE = Special exempt
- PR = Protected ranking
- ITF = ITF entry
- JE = Junior exempt
- w/o = Walkover
- r = Retired
- d = Defaulted
- SR = Special ranking

=== Draw ===
First round
ALT/1	(Czech Republic) T Cibulec (South Africa) C Haggard	6^{5}	6	5
(Belgium) X Malisse (Austria) J Melzer	7^{7}	4	[10]
(Spain) Ó Hernández (Spain) Montañés	2	7^{7}	[10]
(Switzerland) Y Allegro (United States) J Thomas	6	6^{5}	[8]
4	(Germany) C Kas (Netherlands) R Wassen	1	4
(South Africa) J Coetzee (Czech Republic) J Levinský	6	6
(Argentina) J Acasuso (Argentina) JI Chela	3	6	7
(Argentina) M García (Sweden) R Lindstedt	6	2	[10]
(Czech Republic) L Friedl (Czech Republic) D Škoch	1	2
WC	(New Zealand) D King-Turner (United States) D Martin	6	6
(Spain) N Almagro (Argentina) S Roitman	3	7^{7}	[12]
3	(Australia) J Kerr (Australia) T Perry	6	6^{5}	[10]
(Peru) L Horna (Argentina) J Mónaco	6	6
WC	(New Zealand) GD Jones (New Zealand) J Statham	4	4
(Czech Republic) F Čermák (Croatia) L Zovko	4	7	[10]
2	(Brazil) M Melo (Brazil) A Sá	6	5	[8]

Quarterfinals
(Belgium) X Malisse (Austria) J Melzer	7	6
(Spain) Ó Hernández (Spain) Montañés	5	0
(South Africa) J Coetzee (Czech Republic) J Levinský	7^{7}	6
(Argentina) M García (Sweden) R Lindstedt	6^{4}	4
WC	(New Zealand) D King-Turner (United States) D Martin	1	6^{6}
(Spain) N Almagro (Argentina) S Roitman	6	7^{8}
(Peru) L Horna (Argentina) J Mónaco	6	6
(Czech Republic) F Čermák (Croatia) L Zovko	3	2

Semifinals
(Belgium) X Malisse (Austria) J Melzer	6	6
(South Africa) J Coetzee (Czech Republic) J Levinský	3	4
(Spain) N Almagro (Argentina) S Roitman	2	4
(Peru) L Horna (Argentina) J Mónaco	6	6

Final
(Belgium) X Malisse (Austria) J Melzer	4	6	[7]
(Peru) L Horna (Argentina) J Mónaco	6	3	[10]
