= 2013 U.S. Men's Clay Court Championships – Doubles =

Doubles
- 2013 U.S. Men's Clay Court Championships

Final
- Champions: (United Kingdom) Jamie Murray (Australia) John Peers
- Runners-up: (United States) Bob Bryan (United States) Mike Bryan
- Score: 1–6, 7–6^{(7–3)}, [12–10]

Details
- Draw: 16
- Seeds: 4

Events
Singles	Doubles
- U.S. Men's Clay Court Championships

James Blake and Sam Querrey were the defending champions, but lost in the first round to Philipp Marx and Florin Mergea.
Jamie Murray and John Peers won the title, defeating Bob Bryan and Mike Bryan in the final, 1–6, 7–6^{(7–3)}, [12–10].

== Seeds ==
1. (United States) Bob Bryan / (United States) Mike Bryan (final)
2. (Mexico) Santiago González / (United States) Scott Lipsky (first round)
3. (Philippines) Treat Conrad Huey / (United Kingdom) Dominic Inglot (quarterfinals)
4. (United States) Eric Butorac / (Israel) Jonathan Erlich (quarterfinals)

== Draw ==
Key

- Q = Qualifier
- WC = Wild card
- LL = Lucky loser
- Alt = Alternate
- ITF = ITF entry
- PR = Protected ranking
- SR = Special ranking
- SE = Special exempt
- JE = Junior exempt
- JR = Junior Accelerator Programme entrant
- CO = College Accelerator Programme entrant
- NG = Next Gen Accelerator Program entrant
- w/o = Walkover
- r = Retired
- d = Defaulted

=== Draw ===
First round
1	(United States) B Bryan (United States) M Bryan	6	6
(Austria) O Marach (Brazil) A Sá	0	1
(Germany) P Marx (Romania) F Mergea	7^{7}	6
(United States) J Blake (United States) S Querrey	6^{1}	1
3	(Philippines) TC Huey (United Kingdom) D Inglot	6	2	[10]
WC	(Spain) F Verdasco (Germany) M Zverev	3	6	[5]
(Sweden) J Brunström (Canada) J Levine	6	6
(Germany) T Haas (Germany) F Moser	2	2
(United States) N Monroe (Germany) S Stadler	3	6	[4]
(United Kingdom) J Murray (Australia) J Peers	6	1	[10]
PR	(India) S Devvarman (United States) M Russell	1	6^{4}
4	(United States) E Butorac (Israel) J Erlich	6	7^{7}
(Spain) N Almagro (Spain) R Ramírez Hidalgo	6	6
(Italy) F Cipolla (Italy) P Lorenzi	2	1
WC	(United States) S Johnson (United States) J Sock	6	7^{7}
2	(Mexico) S González (United States) S Lipsky	1	6^{5}

Quarterfinals
1	(United States) B Bryan (United States) M Bryan	7	6
(Germany) P Marx (Romania) F Mergea	5	2
3	(Philippines) TC Huey (United Kingdom) D Inglot	4	5
(Sweden) J Brunström (Canada) J Levine	6	7
(United Kingdom) J Murray (Australia) J Peers	6	6
4	(United States) E Butorac (Israel) J Erlich	4	2
(Spain) N Almagro (Spain) R Ramírez Hidalgo	6	6
WC	(United States) S Johnson (United States) J Sock	0	4

Semifinals
1	(United States) B Bryan (United States) M Bryan	6	6
(Sweden) J Brunström (Canada) J Levine	3	4
(United Kingdom) J Murray (Australia) J Peers	6	7^{7}
(Spain) N Almagro (Spain) R Ramírez Hidalgo	3	6^{5}

Final
1	(United States) B Bryan (United States) M Bryan	6	6^{3}	[10]
(United Kingdom) J Murray (Australia) J Peers	1	7^{7}	[12]
