= 2010 Heineken Open – Doubles =

Doubles
- 2010 Heineken Open

Final
- Champions: (New Zealand) Marcus Daniell (Romania) Horia Tecău
- Runners-up: (Brazil) Marcelo Melo (Brazil) Bruno Soares
- Score: 7–5, 6–4

Details
- Draw: 16
- Seeds: 4

Events
Singles	Doubles
← 2009 ·	ATP Auckland Open	· 2011 →

Martin Damm and Robert Lindstedt were the defending champions. Both were present, but chose not compete together this year.
Damm partnered with Filip Polášek, but lost in the first round to Marcel Granollers and Tommy Robredo.
Lindstedt partnered with Julian Knowle, but lost in the first round to Thomaz Bellucci and André Sá.

Marcus Daniell and Horia Tecău won the final, 7–5, 6–4, against Marcelo Melo and Bruno Soares.

== Seeds ==
1. (United States) Bob Bryan / (United States) Mike Bryan (first round)
2. (Czech Republic) Lukáš Dlouhý / (India) Leander Paes (quarterfinals)
3. (Spain) Marcel Granollers / (Spain) Tommy Robredo (quarterfinals)
4. (Austria) Julian Knowle / (Sweden) Robert Lindstedt (first round)

== Draw ==
=== Key ===
- Q = Qualifier
- WC = Wild card
- LL = Lucky loser
- Alt = Alternate
- SE = Special exempt
- PR = Protected ranking
- ITF = ITF entry
- JE = Junior exempt
- w/o = Walkover
- r = Retired
- d = Defaulted
- SR = Special ranking

=== Draw ===
First round
1	(United States) B Bryan (United States) M Bryan	6	4	[6]
(Netherlands) R Wassen (Argentina) H Zeballos	4	6	[10]
(Brazil) M Melo (Brazil) B Soares	6	6
(Austria) J Melzer (Germany) P Petzschner	2	3
4	(Austria) J Knowle (Sweden) R Lindstedt	3	4
(Brazil) T Bellucci (Brazil) A Sá	6	6
(Argentina) L Arnold Ker (Argentina) J Mónaco	6	6
(Spain) G García-López (Spain) A Montañés	3	4
WC	(New Zealand) J Statham (New Zealand) M Statham	3	2
WC	(New Zealand) M Daniell (Romania) H Tecău	6	6
(Czech Republic) M Damm (Slovakia) F Polášek	6	1	[3]
3	(Spain) M Granollers (Spain) T Robredo	2	6	[10]
(Spain) N Almagro (Spain) D Ferrer	6	3	[5]
(Sweden) J Brunström (Netherlands Antilles) J-J Rojer	4	6	[10]
(Czech Republic) J Levinský (United States) T Parrott	5	4
2	(Czech Republic) L Dlouhý (India) L Paes	7	6

Quarterfinals
(Netherlands) R Wassen (Argentina) H Zeballos	1	5
(Brazil) M Melo (Brazil) B Soares	6	7
(Brazil) T Bellucci (Brazil) A Sá	7	6
(Argentina) L Arnold Ker (Argentina) J Mónaco	5	4
WC	(New Zealand) M Daniell (Romania) H Tecău	3	7^{7}	[10]
3	(Spain) M Granollers (Spain) T Robredo	6	6^{5}	[8]
(Sweden) J Brunström (Netherlands Antilles) J-J Rojer	6	6
2	(Czech Republic) L Dlouhý (India) L Paes	2	3

Semifinals
(Brazil) M Melo (Brazil) B Soares	7	6
(Brazil) T Bellucci (Brazil) A Sá	5	3
WC	(New Zealand) M Daniell (Romania) H Tecău	3	7^{7}	[10]
(Sweden) J Brunström (Netherlands Antilles) J-J Rojer	6	6^{4}	[8]

Finals
(Brazil) M Melo (Brazil) B Soares	5	4
WC	(New Zealand) M Daniell (Romania) H Tecău	7	6
