= 2011 Heineken Open – Singles =

Singles
- 2011 Heineken Open

Final
- Champion: (Spain) David Ferrer
- Runner-up: (Argentina) David Nalbandian
- Score: 6–3, 6–2

Details
- Draw: 28 (4 Q / 3 WC )
- Seeds: 8

Events
Singles	Doubles
← 2010 ·	ATP Auckland Open	· 2012 →

John Isner was the defending champion but lost in the quarterfinals to David Nalbandian. David Ferrer won the title, defeating Nalbandian 6–3, 6–2 in the final.

== Seeds ==
The top four seeds receive a bye to the second round.

1. (Spain) David Ferrer (champion)
2. (Spain) Nicolás Almagro (semifinals)
3. (United States) John Isner (quarterfinals)
4. (Spain) Albert Montañés (second round)
5. (Argentina) Juan Mónaco (first round)
6. (Argentina) David Nalbandian (final)
7. (Brazil) Thomaz Bellucci (quarterfinals)
8. (Germany) Philipp Kohlschreiber (quarterfinals)

== Draw ==
=== Key ===
- Q = Qualifier
- WC = Wild card
- LL = Lucky loser
- Alt = Alternate
- SE = Special exempt
- PR = Protected ranking
- ITF = ITF entry
- JE = Junior exempt
- w/o = Walkover
- r = Retired
- d = Defaulted
- SR = Special ranking

=== Finals ===
Semifinals
1	(Spain) David Ferrer	6	7
(Colombia) Santiago Giraldo	3	5
6	(Argentina) David Nalbandian	6	6
2/WC	(Spain) Nicolás Almagro	4	2

Final
1	(Spain) David Ferrer	6	6
6	(Argentina) David Nalbandian	3	2

=== Top half ===
First round
Q	(Spain) P Riba	3	4
(Germany) T Kamke	6	6
Q	(United States) B Reynolds	4	3
(Spain) M Granollers	6	6
(Argentina) C Berlocq	6	3	1
8	(Germany) P Kohlschreiber	2	6	6
(Colombia) S Giraldo	6	6
(Spain) D Gimeno Traver	2	4
WC	(New Zealand) M Venus	7	3	0
(Spain) T Robredo	6^{6}	6	6
Q	(United States) M Russell	4	7	5
7	(Brazil) T Bellucci	6	6^{4}	7

Second round
1	(Spain) D Ferrer	3	7	6
(Germany) T Kamke	6	6^{1}	4
(Spain) M Granollers	4	6	2
8	(Germany) P Kohlschreiber	6	3	6
4	(Spain) A Montañés	3	6	4
(Colombia) S Giraldo	6	4	6
(Spain) T Robredo	4	6	1
7	(Brazil) T Bellucci	6	3	6

Quarterfinals
1	(Spain) D Ferrer	6	6^{4}	6
8	(Germany) P Kohlschreiber	3	7	3
(Colombia) S Giraldo	6	6
7	(Brazil) T Bellucci	2	4

Semifinals
1	(Spain) D Ferrer	6	7
(Colombia) S Giraldo	3	5

=== Bottom half ===
First round
6	(Argentina) D Nalbandian	7	6
(Italy) F Fognini	6^{3}	4
(Netherlands) T de Bakker	1	7	6^{3}
(Germany) P Petzschner	6	6^{5}	7
(Netherlands) R Haase	3	7	7
(Uruguay) P Cuevas	6	6^{3}	6^{3}
5	(Argentina) J Mónaco	4	3
Q	(France) A Mannarino	6	6
WC	(France) A Clément	4	6	7
(Belgium) X Malisse	6	2	5
(Romania) V Hănescu	7	6^{3}	6
(South Africa) K Anderson	6^{7}	7	4

Second round
6	(Argentina) D Nalbandian	6	6
(Germany) P Petzschner	3	2
(Netherlands) R Haase	6	6^{4}	5
3	(United States) J Isner	3	7	7
Q	(France) A Mannarino	7	6
WC	(France) A Clément	5	4
(Romania) V Hănescu	4	6^{3}
2/WC	(Spain) N Almagro	6	7

Quarterfinals
6	(Argentina) D Nalbandian	6	7
3	(United States) J Isner	4	6^{3}
Q	(France) A Mannarino	6^{3}	7	2
2/WC	(Spain) N Almagro	7	6^{1}	6

Semifinals
6	(Argentina) D Nalbandian	6	6
2/WC	(Spain) N Almagro	4	2
