= 2009 Heineken Open =

- Date: 12–17 January
- Edition: 34th
- Category: ATP 250 series
- Draw: 28S / 16D
- Surface: Hard / outdoor
- Location: Auckland, New Zealand
- Venue: ASB Tennis Centre

Champions

Singles
- (Argentina) Juan Martín del Potro

Doubles
- (Czech Republic) Martin Damm / (Sweden) Robert Lindstedt
← 2008 ·	ATP Auckland Open	· 2010 →

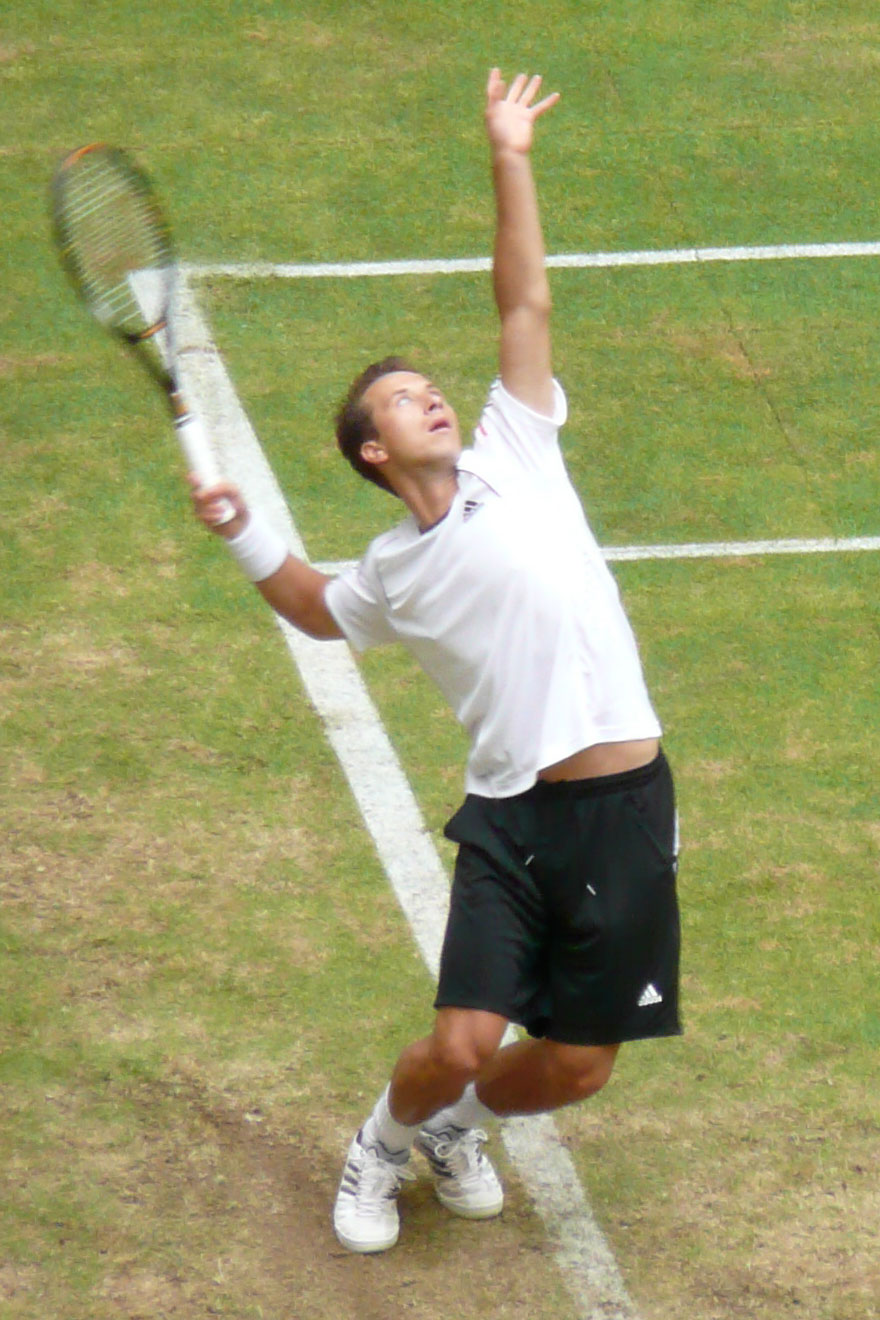
Singles defending champion Philipp Kohlschreiber

The 2009 Heineken Open is a tennis tournament played on outdoor hard courts. It is the 34th edition of the Heineken Open, and part of the ATP World Tour 250 series of the 2009 ATP Tour. It took place at the ASB Tennis Centre in Auckland, New Zealand, from 12 January through 17 January 2009. First-seeded Juan Martín del Potro won the singles title.

The announced singles field is headlined by Juan Martín del Potro, David Ferrer, and Robin Söderling. Also announced are defending champion Philipp Kohlschreiber, Nicolás Almagro, Sam Querrey, Albert Montañés and Juan Mónaco.

== Finals ==
=== Singles ===
(Argentina) Juan Martín del Potro defeated (United States) Sam Querrey, 6–4, 6–4

- It was del Potro's first title of the year and 5th of his career.

=== Doubles ===
(Czech Republic) Martin Damm / (Sweden) Robert Lindstedt defeated (United States) Scott Lipsky / (India) Leander Paes, 7–5, 6–4

== See also ==
- 2009 ASB Classic – women's tournament
