= 2008 Heineken Open – Singles =

Singles
- 2008 Heineken Open

Final
- Champion: (Germany) Philipp Kohlschreiber
- Runner-up: (Spain) Juan Carlos Ferrero
- Score: 7–6^{(7–4)}, 7–5

Details
- Draw: 32 (4Q / 2WC)
- Seeds: 8

Events
| Singles | Doubles |
| ← 2007 · | ATP Auckland Open | · 2009 → |

In the singles event at the 2008 Heineken Open tennis tournament in Auckland, New Zealand, David Ferrer was the defending champion, but lost in the quarterfinals to Julien Benneteau.

Philipp Kohlschreiber won in the final 7–6^{(7–4)}, 7–5, against Juan Carlos Ferrero.

== Seeds ==
1. (Spain) David Ferrer (quarterfinals)
2. (Argentina) Juan Ignacio Chela (second round)
3. (Argentina) Juan Mónaco (semifinals)
4. (Spain) Juan Carlos Ferrero (final)
5. (Finland) Jarkko Nieminen (first round)
6. (Spain) Nicolás Almagro (second round)
7. (Germany) Philipp Kohlschreiber (champion)
8. (Spain) Albert Montañés (second round)

== Draw ==
=== Key ===
- Q = Qualifier
- WC = Wild card
- LL = Lucky loser
- Alt = Alternate
- SE = Special exempt
- PR = Protected ranking
- ITF = ITF entry
- JE = Junior exempt
- w/o = Walkover
- r = Retired
- d = Defaulted
- SR = Special ranking

=== Finals ===
Semifinals
(France) Julien Benneteau | 3 | 4
4 | (Spain) Juan Carlos Ferrero | 6 | 6
3 | (Argentina) Juan Mónaco | 2 | 1
7 | (Germany) Philipp Kohlschreiber | 6 | 6

Final
4 | (Spain) Juan Carlos Ferrero | 6^{4} | 5
7 | (Germany) Philipp Kohlschreiber | 7^{7} | 7

=== Top half ===
First round
1 | (Spain) D Ferrer | 6 | 6
(Spain) Ó Hernández | 1 | 2
(Argentina) S Roitman | 6 | 7
Q | (Czech Republic) L Rosol | 2 | 5
(Israel) D Sela | 4 | 6^{3}
(France) J Benneteau | 6 | 7^{7}
(Argentina) J Acasuso | 3 | 4
6 | (Spain) N Almagro | 6 | 6
4 | (Spain) JC Ferrero | 6 | 6
LL | (United States) J Levine | 4 | 1
(Austria) J Melzer | 6 | 1 | 6
(Austria) W Eschauer | 4 | 6 | 3
Q | (New Zealand) GD Jones | 4 | 2
Q | (Chile) N Massú | 6 | 6
(Belgium) X Malisse | 7^{7} | 6
5 | (Finland) J Nieminen | 6^{3} | 3

Second round
1 | (Spain) D Ferrer | 6 | 7^{7}
(Argentina) S Roitman | 1 | 6^{2}
(France) J Benneteau | 6 | 2 | 6
6 | (Spain) N Almagro | 4 | 6 | 2
4 | (Spain) JC Ferrero | 6 | 7^{8}
(Austria) J Melzer | 3 | 6^{6}
Q | (Chile) N Massú | 6 | 6
(Belgium) X Malisse | 4 | 4

Quarterfinals
1 | (Spain) D Ferrer | 4 | 0
(France) J Benneteau | 6 | 6
4 | (Spain) JC Ferrero | 4 | 6 | 6
Q | (Chile) N Massú | 6 | 3 | 4

Semifinals
(France) J Benneteau | 3 | 4
4 | (Spain) JC Ferrero | 6 | 6

=== Bottom half ===
First round
8 | (Spain) Montañés | 6 | 6
WC | (New Zealand) J Statham | 4 | 4
(South Korea) H-t Lee | 1 | 4
SE | (France) M Llodra | 6 | 6
(Belgium) O Rochus | 6^{8} | 6 | 6
(Germany) M Berrer | 7^{10} | 2 | 4
(Sweden) T Johansson | 4 | 4
3 | (Argentina) J Mónaco | 6 | 6
7 | (Germany) P Kohlschreiber | 7 | 6
(United States) M Russell | 5 | 2
Q | (Czech Republic) T Cakl | 4 | 3
(Croatia) M Čilić | 6 | 6
(United States) S Querrey | 5 | 3
(Germany) F Mayer | 7 | 6
WC | (New Zealand) D King-Turner | 7 | 2 | 5
2 | (Argentina) JI Chela | 5 | 6 | 7

Second round
8 | (Spain) Montañés | 3 | 4
SE | (France) M Llodra | 6 | 6
(Belgium) O Rochus | 3 | 3
3 | (Argentina) J Mónaco | 6 | 6
7 | (Germany) P Kohlschreiber | 6 | 6^{5} | 6
(Croatia) M Čilić | 3 | 7^{7} | 4
(Germany) F Mayer | 6 | 7^{9}
2 | (Argentina) JI Chela | 3 | 6^{7}

Quarterfinals
SE | (France) M Llodra | 6 | 6^{5} | 6^{5}
3 | (Argentina) J Mónaco | 4 | 7^{7} | 7^{7}
7 | (Germany) P Kohlschreiber | 6 | 6
(Germany) F Mayer | 3 | 4

Semifinals
3 | (Argentina) J Mónaco | 2 | 1
7 | (Germany) P Kohlschreiber | 6 | 6
