= 2009 Heineken Open – Doubles =

Doubles
- 2009 Heineken Open

Final
- Champions: (Czech Republic) Martin Damm (Sweden) Robert Lindstedt
- Runners-up: (United States) Scott Lipsky (India) Leander Paes
- Score: 7–5, 6–4

Details
- Draw: 16
- Seeds: 4

Events
| Singles | Doubles |
| ← 2008 · | ATP Auckland Open | · 2010 → |

Luis Horna and Juan Mónaco were the defending champions, but Horna chose not to participate, and only Mónaco competed that year.
Mónaco partnered with Agustín Calleri, but lost in the quarterfinals to Paul Hanley and Jordan Kerr.

Martin Damm and Robert Lindstedt won in the final, 7–5, 6–4, against Scott Lipsky and Leander Paes.

== Seeds ==
1. (Czech Republic) Martin Damm / (Sweden) Robert Lindstedt (champions)
2. (United States) Scott Lipsky / (India) Leander Paes (final)
3. (Germany) Christopher Kas / (Netherlands) Rogier Wassen (first round)
4. (Czech Republic) František Čermák / (Slovakia) Michal Mertiňák (semifinals)

== Draw ==
=== Key ===
- Q = Qualifier
- WC = Wild card
- LL = Lucky loser
- Alt = Alternate
- SE = Special exempt
- PR = Protected ranking
- ITF = ITF entry
- JE = Junior exempt
- w/o = Walkover
- r = Retired
- d = Defaulted
- SR = Special ranking

=== Draw ===
First round
1 | (Czech Republic) M Damm (Sweden) R Lindstedt | 6 | 6
WC | (New Zealand) D King-Turner (Australia) T Perry | 3 | 2
WC | (New Zealand) J Statham (New Zealand) M Statham | 7 | 4 | [9]
(Spain) D Ferrer (Spain) M Granollers | 5 | 6 | [11]
4 | (Czech Republic) F Čermák (Slovakia) M Mertiňák | 6 | 6
(United States) T Parrott (Slovakia) F Polášek | 4 | 1
(Germany) M Kohlmann (Germany) P Petzschner | 4 | 6 | [10]
(Australia) S Huss (United Kingdom) R Hutchins | 6 | 4 | [8]
(United States) J Cerretani (Romania) V Hănescu | 5 | 5
(Argentina) A Calleri (Argentina) J Mónaco | 7 | 7
(Australia) P Hanley (Australia) J Kerr | 7^{7} | 7
3 | (Germany) C Kas (Netherlands) R Wassen | 6^{3} | 5
(Spain) N Almagro (Spain) I Navarro | 3 | 6 | [10]
(India) R Bopanna (South Africa) J Coetzee | 6 | 3 | [6]
(Russia) I Kunitsyn (United States) D Martin | 1 | 6 | [10]
2 | (United States) S Lipsky (India) L Paes | 6 | 4 | [12]

Quarterfinals
1 | (Czech Republic) M Damm (Sweden) R Lindstedt | 6 | 3 | [10]
(Spain) D Ferrer (Spain) M Granollers | 3 | 6 | [2]
4 | (Czech Republic) F Čermák (Slovakia) M Mertiňák | 6 | 6
(Germany) M Kohlmann (Germany) P Petzschner | 1 | 4
(Argentina) A Calleri (Argentina) J Mónaco | 6^{3} | 2
(Australia) P Hanley (Australia) J Kerr | 7^{7} | 6
(Spain) N Almagro (Spain) I Navarro | 5 | 1
2 | (United States) S Lipsky (India) L Paes | 7 | 6

Semifinals
1 | (Czech Republic) M Damm (Sweden) R Lindstedt | 6 | 6
4 | (Czech Republic) F Čermák (Slovakia) M Mertiňák | 3 | 2
(Australia) P Hanley (Australia) J Kerr | 3 | 7^{7} | [7]
2 | (United States) S Lipsky (India) L Paes | 6 | 6^{4} | [10]

Final
1 | (Czech Republic) M Damm (Sweden) R Lindstedt | 7 | 6
2 | (United States) S Lipsky (India) L Paes | 5 | 4
