= 2010 Heineken Open =

- Date: 11–16 January
- Edition: 35th
- Category: ATP 250 series
- Draw: 28S / 16D
- Prize money: $355,500
- Surface: Hard / outdoor
- Location: Auckland, New Zealand
- Venue: ASB Tennis Centre

Champions

Singles
- (United States) John Isner

Doubles
- (New Zealand) Marcus Daniell / (Romania) Horia Tecău
← 2009 ·	ATP Auckland Open	· 2011 →

The 2010 Heineken Open was a tennis tournament played on outdoor hard courts. It was the 35th edition of the Heineken Open, and was part of the ATP World Tour 250 series of the 2010 ATP World Tour. It took place at the ASB Tennis Centre in Auckland, New Zealand, from 11 January through 16 January 2010. Unseeded John Isner won the singles title.

== ATP entrants ==
=== Seeds ===
Country	Player	Rank*	Seed
ESP	Tommy Robredo	16	1
ESP	David Ferrer	17	2
ESP	Juan Carlos Ferrero	23	3
ESP	Nicolás Almagro	26	4
GER	Philipp Kohlschreiber	27	5
AUT	Jürgen Melzer	28	6
ARG	Juan Mónaco	30	7
ESP	Albert Montañés	31	8

- as of January 4, 2010

=== Other entrants ===
The following players received wildcards into the singles main draw:

- (France) Sébastien Grosjean
- (New Zealand) Daniel King-Turner
- (New Zealand) Jose Statham

The following players received entry into the singles main draw through qualifying:

- (United Kingdom) Daniel Evans
- (Switzerland) Michael Lammer
- (Australia) James Lemke
- (Italy) Paolo Lorenzi

The following player received the lucky loser spot:

- (Spain) Iñigo Cervantes-Huegun

== Finals ==
=== Singles ===
(United States) John Isner defeated (France) Arnaud Clément, 6–3, 5–7, 7–6^{(7–2)}.

- It was Isner's first singles title of his career.

=== Doubles ===
(New Zealand) Marcus Daniell / (Romania) Horia Tecău defeated (Brazil) Marcelo Melo / (Brazil) Bruno Soares, 7–5, 6–4.

== See also ==
- 2010 ASB Classic – women's tournament
