= 2012 Heineken Open – Doubles =

Doubles
- 2012 Heineken Open

Final
- Champions: (Austria) Oliver Marach (Austria) Alexander Peya
- Runners-up: (Czech Republic) František Čermák (Slovakia) Filip Polášek
- Score: 6–3, 6–2

Details
- Draw: 16
- Seeds: 4

Events
Singles	Doubles
← 2011 ·	ATP Auckland Open	· 2013 →

Marcel Granollers and Tommy Robredo were the defending champions but decided not to participate.

No.1 seeds Oliver Marach and Alexander Peya won the title beating František Čermák and Filip Polášek in the final, 6–3, 6–2.

== Seeds ==
1. (Austria) Oliver Marach / (Austria) Alexander Peya (champions)
2. (United States) Eric Butorac / (Brazil) Bruno Soares (semifinals)
3. (Czech Republic) František Čermák / (Slovakia) Filip Polášek (final)
4. (Mexico) Santiago González / (Germany) Christopher Kas (quarterfinals)

== Draw ==
=== Key ===
- Q = Qualifier
- WC = Wild card
- LL = Lucky loser
- Alt = Alternate
- SE = Special exempt
- PR = Protected ranking
- ITF = ITF entry
- JE = Junior exempt
- w/o = Walkover
- r = Retired
- d = Defaulted
- SR = Special ranking

=== Draw ===
First round
1	(Austria) O Marach (Austria) A Peya	6	6
(Spain) D Ferrer (Spain) A Montañés	2	4
(Spain) G García-López (Spain) F Verdasco	6	6
(Brazil) T Bellucci (Colombia) S Giraldo	0	3
4	(Mexico) S González (Germany) C Kas	6^{5}	6	[10]
(Australia) P Hanley (United Kingdom) J Murray	7^{7}	1	[5]
(Philippines) TC Huey (United States) S Lipsky	6	5	[8]
WC	(New Zealand) D King-Turner (New Zealand) M Venus	4	7	[10]
(Italy) D Bracciali (Italy) P Starace	4	6	[4]
(Spain) D Marrero (Brazil) A Sá	6	2	[10]
WC	(New Zealand) A Sitak (New Zealand) J Statham	3	2
3	(Czech Republic) F Čermák (Slovakia) F Polášek	6	6
(United States) J Cerretani (United States) D Young	1	6^{0}
(Argentina) C Berlocq (Argentina) JI Chela	6	7^{7}
(Czech Republic) L Dlouhý (Brazil) M Melo	5	0
2	(United States) E Butorac (Brazil) B Soares	7	6

Quarterfinals
1	(Austria) O Marach (Austria) A Peya	w/o
(Spain) G García-López (Spain) F Verdasco
4	(Mexico) S González (Germany) C Kas	5	6^{5}
WC	(New Zealand) D King-Turner (New Zealand) M Venus	7	7^{7}
(Spain) D Marrero (Brazil) A Sá	7	2	[5]
3	(Czech Republic) F Čermák (Slovakia) F Polášek	5	6	[10]
(Argentina) C Berlocq (Argentina) JI Chela	1	4
2	(United States) E Butorac (Brazil) B Soares	6	6

Semifinals
1	(Austria) O Marach (Austria) A Peya	6	6
WC	(New Zealand) D King-Turner (New Zealand) M Venus	2	2
3	(Czech Republic) F Čermák (Slovakia) F Polášek	7^{7}	5	[10]
2	(United States) E Butorac (Brazil) B Soares	6^{3}	7	[7]

Final
1	(Austria) O Marach (Austria) A Peya	6	6
3	(Czech Republic) F Čermák (Slovakia) F Polášek	3	2
