= 2011 Heineken Open =

- Date: 10–15 January
- Edition: 36th
- Category: ATP 250 series
- Draw: 28S / 16D
- Surface: Hard / outdoor
- Location: Auckland, New Zealand
- Venue: ASB Tennis Centre

Champions

Singles
- (Spain) David Ferrer

Doubles
- (Spain) Marcel Granollers / (Spain) Tommy Robredo
← 2010 ·	ATP Auckland Open	· 2012 →

The 2011 Heineken Open was a men's tennis tournament played on outdoor hard courts. It was the 36th edition of the Heineken Open, and was part of the ATP World Tour 250 series of the 2011 ATP World Tour. It took place at the ASB Tennis Centre in Auckland, New Zealand, from 10 January through 15 January 2011. First-seeded David Ferrer won the singles title.

== ATP entrants ==
=== Seeds ===
Country	Player	Rank*	Seed
ESP	David Ferrer	7	1
ESP	Nicolás Almagro	15	2
USA	John Isner	19	3
ESP	Albert Montañés	25	4
ARG	Juan Mónaco	26	5
ARG	David Nalbandian	27	6
BRA	Thomaz Bellucci	31	7
GER	Philipp Kohlschreiber	34	8

=== Other entrants ===
The following players received wildcards into the singles main draw:

- (Spain) Nicolás Almagro
- (France) Arnaud Clément
- (New Zealand) Michael Venus

The following players received entry into the singles main draw through qualifying:

- (France) Adrian Mannarino
- (United States) Bobby Reynolds
- (Spain) Pere Riba
- (United States) Michael Russell

== Finals ==
=== Singles ===
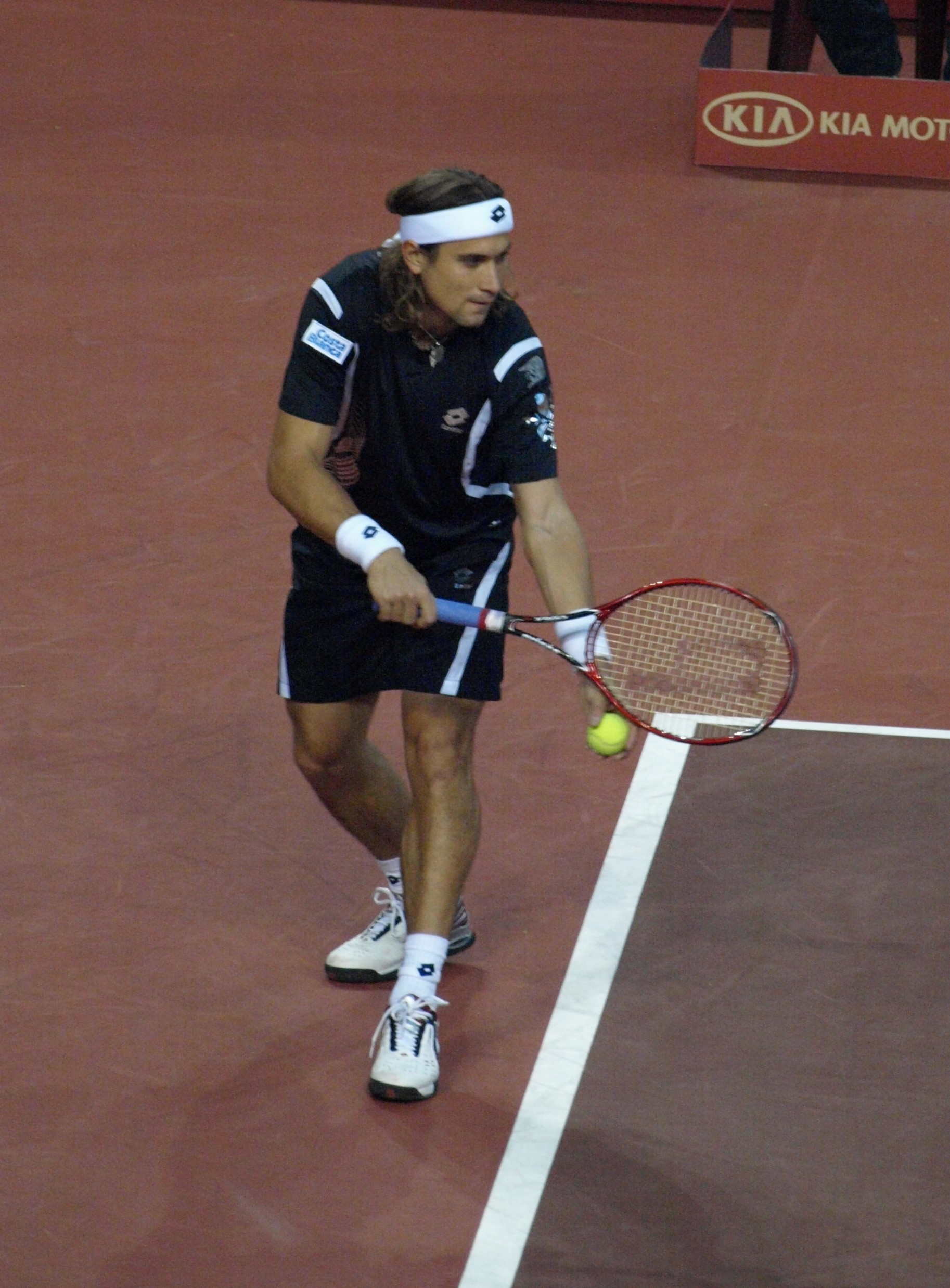
David Ferrer, the 2011 Heineken Open champion

(Spain) David Ferrer defeated (Argentina) David Nalbandian, 6–3, 6–2

- It was Ferrer's first title of the year and 10th of his career. It was his second win at the event, also winning in 2007.

=== Doubles ===
(Spain) Marcel Granollers / (Spain) Tommy Robredo defeated (Sweden) Johan Brunström / (Australia) Stephen Huss, 6–4, 7–6^{(8–6)}

== See also ==
- 2011 ASB Classic – women's tournament
