= 2013 U.S. Men's Clay Court Championships – Singles =

Tennis tournament

Singles
- 2013 U.S. Men's Clay Court Championships

Final
- Champion: (United States) John Isner
- Runner-up: (Spain) Nicolás Almagro
- Score: 6–3, 7–5

Details
- Draw: 28
- Seeds: 8

Events
Singles	Doubles
- U.S. Men's Clay Court Championships

Juan Mónaco was the defending champion, but lost to John Isner in the semifinals.
Isner went on to win the title, defeating Nicolás Almagro in the final, 6–3, 7–5.

== Seeds ==
The top four seeds received a bye into the second round.

1. (Spain) Nicolás Almagro (final)
2. (Germany) Tommy Haas (second round)
3. (Argentina) Juan Mónaco (semifinals)
4. (United States) Sam Querrey (withdrew because of a right pectoral muscle strain)
5. (United States) John Isner (champion)
6. (Spain) Fernando Verdasco (second round)
7. (Italy) Paolo Lorenzi (quarterfinals)
8. (United States) Michael Russell (first round)

== Draw ==
Key

- Q = Qualifier
- WC = Wild card
- LL = Lucky loser
- Alt = Alternate
- ITF = ITF entry
- PR = Protected ranking
- SR = Special ranking
- SE = Special exempt
- JE = Junior exempt
- JR = Junior Accelerator Programme entrant
- CO = College Accelerator Programme entrant
- NG = Next Gen Accelerator Program entrant
- w/o = Walkover
- r = Retired
- d = Defaulted

=== Finals ===
Semifinals
1	(Spain) Nicolás Almagro	6	6
WC	(United States) Rhyne Williams	2	1
3	(Argentina) Juan Mónaco	6	4	4
5	(United States) John Isner	1	6	6

Final
1	(Spain) Nicolás Almagro	3	5
5	(United States) John Isner	6	7

=== Top half ===
First round
(France) G Monfils	7^{7}	7
(United States) J Blake	6^{5}	5
(Italy) F Cipolla	4	6	7
Q	(Argentina) F Argüello	6	4	5
Q	(Austria) G Melzer	2	2
7	(Italy) P Lorenzi	6	6
WC	(United States) R Williams	7	7
(Argentina) G Pella	5	5
PR	(India) S Devvarman	6^{5}	0
(Spain) R Ramírez Hidalgo	7^{7}	6
WC	(United States) S Johnson	6^{5}	2
6	(Spain) F Verdasco	7^{7}	6

Second round
1	(Spain) N Almagro	2	6	6
(France) G Monfils	6	0	3
(Italy) F Cipolla	6^{4}	1
7	(Italy) P Lorenzi	7^{7}	6
LL	(Croatia) I Karlović	4	7^{7}	6^{3}
WC	(United States) R Williams	6	6^{5}	7^{7}
(Spain) R Ramírez Hidalgo	6	6
6	(Spain) F Verdasco	3	2

Quarterfinals
1	(Spain) N Almagro	6	6
7	(Italy) P Lorenzi	4	4
WC	(United States) R Williams	7^{7}	1	6
(Spain) R Ramírez Hidalgo	6^{1}	6	4

Semifinals
1	(Spain) N Almagro	6	6
WC	(United States) R Williams	2	1

=== Bottom half ===
First round
8	(United States) M Russell	2	2
Q	(United States) R Ginepri	6	6
(Argentina) M Alund	4	6	6
(Australia) L Hewitt	6	3	1
(France) J Ouanna	1	2
(United States) T Smyczek	6	6
5	(United States) J Isner	7^{7}	6
(United States) R Harrison	6^{4}	4
WC	(United States) J Sock	7^{7}	6
Q	(United States) B Klahn	6^{3}	3
(Lithuania) R Berankis	6^{3}	7	6
(Canada) J Levine	7^{7}	5	4

Second round
Q	(United States) R Ginepri	6	4	6
(Argentina) M Alund	2	6	4
(United States) T Smyczek	6^{5}	1
3	(Argentina) J Mónaco	7^{7}	6
5	(United States) J Isner	7	6^{3}	7^{7}
WC	(United States) J Sock	5	7^{7}	6^{3}
(Lithuania) R Berankis	6	6
2	(Germany) T Haas	3	3

Quarterfinals
Q	(United States) R Ginepri	1	0
3	(Argentina) J Mónaco	6	6
5	(United States) J Isner	6	3	6
(Lithuania) R Berankis	3	6	3

Semifinals
3	(Argentina) J Mónaco	6	4	4
5	(United States) J Isner	1	6	6

== Qualifying ==
=== Seeds ===
The top five seeds receive a bye into the second round.

1. (Croatia) Ivo Karlović (qualifying competition, lucky loser)
2. (Germany) Mischa Zverev (second round)
3. (Russia) Teymuraz Gabashvili (qualifying competition)
4. (United States) Bradley Klahn (qualified)
5. (Canada) Peter Polansky (qualifying competition)
6. (Argentina) Facundo Argüello (qualified)
7. (United States) Michael Yani (first round, retired)
8. (United States) Alex Kuznetsov (first round)

=== Qualifiers ===
1. (Austria) Gerald Melzer
2. (United States) Robby Ginepri
3. (Argentina) Facundo Argüello
4. (United States) Bradley Klahn

=== Lucky losers ===
1. (Croatia) Ivo Karlović

=== Draw ===
==== First qualifier ====
First round
(United States) William Boe-Wiegaard	2	2
(Romania) Florin Mergea	6	6
(United States) Nicholas Edlefsen	2	2
(Moldova) Roman Borvanov	6	6
(Austria) Gerald Melzer	6	6
8	(United States) Alex Kuznetsov	2	4

Second round
1	(Croatia) Ivo Karlović	6	6
(Romania) Florin Mergea	4	3
(Moldova) Roman Borvanov	7	6^{2}	1
(Austria) Gerald Melzer	5	7^{7}	6

Qualifying competition
1	(Croatia) Ivo Karlović	4	6^{3}
(Austria) Gerald Melzer	6	7^{7}

==== Second qualifier ====
First round					Second round					Qualifying competition
					2	(Germany) Mischa Zverev	2	6	2
	(United States) Robby Ginepri	6	6			(United States) Robby Ginepri	6	4	6
WC	(United States) Bayo Philips	2	0								(United States) Robby Ginepri	7^{7}	7^{7}
(New Zealand) Michael Venus		5	6	4						5	(Canada) Peter Polansky	6^{5}	6^{3}
(Germany) Frank Moser		7	4	6		(Germany) Frank Moser	6^{4}	6^{4}
					5	(Canada) Peter Polansky	7^{7}	7^{7}

==== Third qualifier ====
First round
(Zimbabwe) Takanyi Garanganga	6	5	7
(United States) Scott Lipsky	4	7	5
(South Africa) Fritz Wolmarans	5	6	3
(United States) Chris Wettengel	7	1	6
WC	(United States) David Warren	2	3
6	(Argentina) Facundo Argüello	6	6

Second round
3	(Russia) Teymuraz Gabashvili	6	7^{7}
(Zimbabwe) Takanyi Garanganga	2	6^{1}
(United States) Chris Wettengel	3	2
6	(Argentina) Facundo Argüello	6	6

Qualifying competition
3	(Russia) Teymuraz Gabashvili	3	2
6	(Argentina) Facundo Argüello	6	6

==== Fourth qualifier ====
First round
(United States) Greg Ouellette	6	6
WC	(United States) Connor Curry	2	2
(Slovenia) Luka Gregorc	7	6
(Switzerland) Vullnet Tashi	5	1
(Australia) John Peers	5	7	0
7	(United States) Michael Yani	7	5	0^{r}

Second round
4	(United States) Bradley Klahn	7^{11}	6
(United States) Greg Ouellette	6^{9}	4
(Slovenia) Luka Gregorc	6	6
(Australia) John Peers	4	4

Qualifying competition
4	(United States) Bradley Klahn	6	6
(Slovenia) Luka Gregorc	1	4
