= 2011 Heineken Open – Doubles =

Doubles
- 2011 Heineken Open

Final
- Champions: (Spain) Marcel Granollers (Spain) Tommy Robredo
- Runners-up: (Sweden) Johan Brunström (Australia) Stephen Huss
- Score: 6–4, 7–6^{(8–6)}

Details
- Draw: 16
- Seeds: 4

Events
Singles	Doubles
← 2010 ·	ATP Auckland Open	· 2012 →

Marcus Daniell and Horia Tecău were the defending champions, but they don't participate together this year.
Daniell partnered with Artem Sitak, but they were eliminated in the first round, by František Čermák and Christopher Kas.
Tecău played alongside Robert Lindstedt. However, they withdrew from the tournament before their first round match, against Jose Statham and Mikal Statham.
2nd seeds Marcel Granollers and Tommy Robredo won this tournament. Spanish pair defeated Johan Brunström and Stephen Huss 6–4, 7–6^{(8–6)} in the final.

== Seeds ==
1. (Sweden) Robert Lindstedt / (Romania) Horia Tecău (withdrew due to Lindstedt's left calf injury)
2. (Spain) Marcel Granollers / (Spain) Tommy Robredo (champions)
3. (Germany) Michael Kohlmann / (Germany) Philipp Petzschner (first round)
4. (Spain) Nicolás Almagro / (Spain) Marc López (semifinals)

== Draw ==
=== Key ===
- Q = Qualifier
- WC = Wild card
- LL = Lucky loser
- Alt = Alternate
- SE = Special exempt
- PR = Protected ranking
- ITF = ITF entry
- JE = Junior exempt
- w/o = Walkover
- r = Retired
- d = Defaulted
- SR = Special ranking

=== Draw ===
First round
ALT	(Italy) F Fognini (Spain) P Riba	6	6
WC	(New Zealand) J Statham (New Zealand) M Statham	1	3
(Sweden) J Brunström (Australia) S Huss	6	6
(Brazil) M Melo (Brazil) B Soares	4	4
3	(Germany) M Kohlmann (Germany) P Petzschner	5	4
(Spain) D Gimeno-Traver (Spain) D Marrero	7	6
(Spain) D Ferrer (Spain) A Montañés	4	6^{9}
(United States) E Butorac (Curaçao) J-J Rojer	6	7
(Mexico) S González (United Kingdom) J Murray	7	3	[10]
(United States) S Lipsky (Slovakia) I Zelenay	6^{10}	6	[3]
(Argentina) C Berlocq (Romania) V Hănescu	2	4
4	(Spain) N Almagro (Spain) M López	6	6
(New Zealand) M Daniell (New Zealand) A Sitak	4	4
(Czech Republic) F Čermák (Germany) C Kas	6	6
(Uruguay) P Cuevas (Argentina) J Mónaco	6^{0}	7	[6]
2	(Spain) M Granollers (Spain) T Robredo	7	5	[10]

Quarterfinals
ALT	(Italy) F Fognini (Spain) P Riba	5	2
(Sweden) J Brunström (Australia) S Huss	7	6
(Spain) D Gimeno-Traver (Spain) D Marrero	6^{5}	4
(United States) E Butorac (Curaçao) J-J Rojer	7	6
(Mexico) S González (United Kingdom) J Murray	4	4
4	(Spain) N Almagro (Spain) M López	6	6
(Czech Republic) F Čermák (Germany) C Kas	3	4
2	(Spain) M Granollers (Spain) T Robredo	6	6

Semifinals
(Sweden) J Brunström (Australia) S Huss	7	7
(United States) E Butorac (Curaçao) J-J Rojer	5	6^{1}
4	(Spain) N Almagro (Spain) M López	6^{1}	2
2	(Spain) M Granollers (Spain) T Robredo	7	6

Final
(Sweden) J Brunström (Australia) S Huss	4	6^{6}
2	(Spain) M Granollers (Spain) T Robredo	6	7
