= 2012 Heineken Open =

- Date: 9–14 January
- Edition: 37th
- Category: ATP World Tour 250 series
- Draw: 28S / 16D
- Location: Auckland, New Zealand
- Venue: ASB Tennis Centre

Champions

Singles
- (Spain) David Ferrer

Doubles
- (Austria) Oliver Marach / (Austria) Alexander Peya
← 2011 ·	ATP Auckland Open	· 2013 →

The 2012 Heineken Open was a men's tennis tournament played on outdoor hard courts. It was the 37th edition of the Heineken Open, and was part of the ATP World Tour 250 series of the 2012 ATP World Tour. It took place at the ASB Tennis Centre in Auckland, New Zealand, from 9 January to 14 January 2012. First-seeded David Ferrer won the singles title, his 3rd win at the event after 2007 and 2011.

== Finals ==
=== Singles ===
(Spain) David Ferrer defeated (Belgium) Olivier Rochus, 6–3, 6–4

- It was Ferrer's 1st title of the year and 12th of his career.

=== Doubles ===
(Austria) Oliver Marach / (Austria) Alexander Peya defeated (Czech Republic) František Čermák / (Slovakia) Filip Polášek, 6–3, 6–2

== Singles main-draw entrants ==
=== Seeds ===
Country	Player	Rank	Seed
ESP	David Ferrer	5	1
ESP	Nicolás Almagro	10	2
ESP	Fernando Verdasco	24	3
ARG	Juan Ignacio Chela	29	4
RSA	Kevin Anderson	32	5
BRA	Thomaz Bellucci	37	6
USA	Donald Young	39	7
GER	Philipp Kohlschreiber	43	8

- Rankings as of December 26, 2011

=== Other entrants ===
The following players received wildcards into the singles main draw:

- (United States) Ryan Harrison
- (United States) Sam Querrey
- (New Zealand) Michael Venus

The following players received entry into the singles main draw through qualifying:

- (Switzerland) Stéphane Bohli
- (Germany) Tobias Kamke
- (France) Adrian Mannarino
- (France) Benoît Paire

=== Retirements ===
- (Italy) Filippo Volandri (finger injury)

== See also ==
- 2014 ASB Classic – women's tournament
