= 2012 Heineken Open – Singles =

Singles
- 2012 Heineken Open

Final
- Champion: (Spain) David Ferrer
- Runner-up: (Belgium) Olivier Rochus
- Score: 6–3, 6–4

Details
- Draw: 28 (4 Q / 3 WC )
- Seeds: 8

Events
Singles	Doubles
- ATP Auckland Open

In the singles event of the 2012 Heineken Open men's tennis tournament, David Ferrer was the defending champion and confirmed his title beating unseeded player Olivier Rochus in the final, 6–3, 6–4, for his 3rd win in Auckland.

== Seeds ==
1. (Spain) David Ferrer (champion)
2. (Spain) Nicolás Almagro (quarterfinals)
3. (Spain) Fernando Verdasco (semifinals)
4. (Argentina) Juan Ignacio Chela (second round)
5. (South Africa) Kevin Anderson (first round)
6. (Brazil) Thomaz Bellucci (second round)
7. (United States) Donald Young (first round)
8. (Germany) Philipp Kohlschreiber (semifinals)

== Draw ==
Key

- Q = Qualifier
- WC = Wild card
- LL = Lucky loser
- Alt = Alternate
- ITF = ITF entry
- PR = Protected ranking
- SR = Special ranking
- SE = Special exempt
- JE = Junior exempt
- JR = Junior Accelerator Programme entrant
- CO = College Accelerator Programme entrant
- NG = Next Gen Accelerator Program entrant
- w/o = Walkover
- r = Retired
- d = Defaulted

=== Finals ===
Semifinals
1	(Spain) David Ferrer	6	6
3	(Spain) Fernando Verdasco	3	4
(Belgium) Olivier Rochus	6^{4}	6	6
8	(Germany) Philipp Kohlschreiber	7^{7}	1	4

Final
1	(Spain) David Ferrer	6	6
(Belgium) Olivier Rochus	3	4

=== Top half ===
First round
(Spain) A Ramos	2	4
(Czech Republic) L Rosol	6	6
(Spain) A Montañés	3	2
(Italy) P Starace	6	6
(Colombia) A Falla	4	6	6
7	(United States) D Young	6	3	3
(Argentina) C Berlocq	6
(Italy) F Volandri	5^{r}
(Russia) I Kunitsyn	6	4	2
(Spain) G García-López	2	6	6
Q	(France) A Mannarino	6	6
5	(South Africa) K Anderson	3	3

Second round
1	(Spain) D Ferrer	6	6
(Czech Republic) L Rosol	4	2
(Italy) P Starace	6^{3}	3
(Colombia) A Falla	7^{7}	6
3	(Spain) F Verdasco	7	7^{7}
(Argentina) C Berlocq	5	6^{3}
(Spain) G García-López	6	6
Q	(France) A Mannarino	2	3

Quarterfinals
1	(Spain) D Ferrer	6	4	6
(Colombia) A Falla	4	6	3
3	(Spain) F Verdasco	7	6
(Spain) G García-López	5	4

Semifinals
1	(Spain) D Ferrer	6	6
3	(Spain) F Verdasco	3	4

=== Bottom half ===
First round
6	(Brazil) T Bellucci	6	7^{7}
(Portugal) R Machado	3	6^{3}
(Belgium) O Rochus	7	6
Q	(Germany) T Kamke	5	4
(Spain) JC Ferrero	3	2
Q	(France) B Paire	6	6
8	(Germany) P Kohlschreiber	6	4	6
Q	(Switzerland) S Bohli	4	6	4
WC	(United States) R Harrison	6	6
WC	(United States) S Querrey	4	3
WC	(New Zealand) M Venus	4	3
(Colombia) S Giraldo	6	6

Second round
6	(Brazil) T Bellucci	6^{6}	7	6^{5}
(Belgium) O Rochus	7^{8}	5	7^{7}
Q	(France) B Paire	5	6	6
4	(Argentina) JI Chela	7	2	2
8	(Germany) P Kohlschreiber	4	6	6
WC	(United States) R Harrison	6	4	3
(Colombia) S Giraldo	4	2
2	(Spain) N Almagro	6	6

Quarterfinals
(Belgium) O Rochus	6	6^{5}	7^{7}
Q	(France) B Paire	3	7^{7}	6^{4}
8	(Germany) P Kohlschreiber	7^{7}	6
2	(Spain) N Almagro	6^{5}	4

Semifinals
(Belgium) O Rochus	6^{4}	6	6
8	(Germany) P Kohlschreiber	7^{7}	1	4

== Qualifying ==
=== Seeds ===
1. (Colombia) ~~Alejandro Falla~~ (moved to main draw)
2. (Italy) Flavio Cipolla (qualifying competition)
3. (Brazil) Ricardo Mello (qualifying competition)
4. (France) Adrian Mannarino (qualified)
5. (Spain) Pere Riba (first round)
6. (France) Benoît Paire (qualified)
7. (Germany) Tobias Kamke (qualified)
8. (South Africa) Izak van der Merwe (first round)

=== Qualifiers ===
1. (France) Benoît Paire
2. (Germany) Tobias Kamke
3. (Switzerland) Stéphane Bohli
4. (France) Adrian Mannarino

=== Draw ===
==== First qualifier ====
First round
Alt	(New Zealand) Adam Thompson	3	4
(Spain) Iñigo Cervantes Huegun	6	6
(Colombia) Alejandro González	6	3	4
(Switzerland) Michael Lammer	3	6	6
WC	(New Zealand) Sebastian Lavie	4	6^{7}
WC	(New Zealand) Anton Bettink	6	7^{9}
(Chinese Taipei) Yang Tsung-hua	3	1
6	(France) Benoît Paire	6	6

Second round
(Spain) Iñigo Cervantes Huegun	6	7
(Switzerland) Michael Lammer	2	5
WC	(New Zealand) Anton Bettink	2	1
6	(France) Benoît Paire	6	6

Qualifying competition
(Spain) Iñigo Cervantes Huegun	7^{8}	2	2
6	(France) Benoît Paire	6^{6}	6	6

==== Second qualifier ====
First round
2	(Italy) Flavio Cipolla	3	6	6
WC	(New Zealand) Jaden Grinter	6	3	2
(Czech Republic) Lukáš Dlouhý	6	6
(Argentina) Facundo Bagnis	4	4
WC	(New Zealand) Daniel King-Turner	4	6^{4}
(Spain) Javier Martí	6	7^{7}
(United States) Jesse Levine	3	3
7	(Germany) Tobias Kamke	6	6

Second round
2	(Italy) Flavio Cipolla	5	6	4
(Czech Republic) Lukáš Dlouhý	7	3	1^{r}
(Spain) Javier Martí	3	4
7	(Germany) Tobias Kamke	6	6

Qualifying competition
2	(Italy) Flavio Cipolla	3	2
7	(Germany) Tobias Kamke	6	6

==== Third qualifier ====
First round
3	(Brazil) Ricardo Mello	6	6
(New Zealand) Marcus Daniell	4	3
(South Africa) Rik de Voest	7	6
(New Zealand) Jose Statham	5	2
(Spain) Arnau Brugués-Davi	7	6
(Portugal) João Sousa	5	3
(Switzerland) Stéphane Bohli	3	6	6
8	(South Africa) Izak van der Merwe	6	2	1

Second round
3	(Brazil) Ricardo Mello	6	6
(South Africa) Rik de Voest	4	4
(Spain) Arnau Brugués-Davi	5	6	3
(Switzerland) Stéphane Bohli	7	4	6

Qualifying competition
3	(Brazil) Ricardo Mello	5	4
(Switzerland) Stéphane Bohli	7	6

==== Fourth qualifier ====
First round
4	(France) Adrian Mannarino	6	6
(Argentina) Eduardo Schwank	0	2
(Belgium) Yannick Mertens	6	6^{2}	6
(Canada) Pierre-Ludovic Duclos	2	7^{7}	3
(United States) Denis Kudla	3	7^{7}	0
(New Zealand) Artem Sitak	6	6^{5}	6
(Slovakia) Dominik Hrbatý	6	6
5	(Spain) Pere Riba	4	2

Second round
4	(France) Adrian Mannarino	6	6
(Belgium) Yannick Mertens	3	4
(New Zealand) Artem Sitak	6	6
(Slovakia) Dominik Hrbatý	3	4

Qualifying competition
4	(France) Adrian Mannarino	6	6
(New Zealand) Artem Sitak	1	0
