= 2021 Western & Southern Open – Men's singles =

US Open tennis match

Men's singles
- 2021 Western & Southern Open

Final
- Champion: (Germany) Alexander Zverev
- Runner-up: (Russia) Andrey Rublev
- Score: 6–2, 6–3

Details
- Draw: 56 (7 Q / 4 WC )
- Seeds: 16

Events
Singles	men	women
Doubles	men	women
← 2020 ·	Western & Southern Open	· 2022 →

Alexander Zverev defeated Andrey Rublev in the final, 6–2, 6–3 to win the men's singles tennis title at the 2021 Cincinnati Masters. It was his fifth Masters 1000 title and 17th career singles title on the ATP Tour.

Novak Djokovic was the reigning champion, but did not participate.

== Seeds ==
The top eight seeds receive a bye into the second round.

1. (Russia) Daniil Medvedev (semifinals)
2. (Greece) Stefanos Tsitsipas (semifinals)
3. (Germany) Alexander Zverev (champion)
4. (Russia) Andrey Rublev (final)
5. (Italy) Matteo Berrettini (third round)
6. (Canada) Denis Shapovalov (second round)
7. (Spain) Pablo Carreño Busta (quarterfinals)
8. (Norway) Casper Ruud (quarterfinals)

9. (Poland) Hubert Hurkacz (third round)
10. (Argentina) Diego Schwartzman (third round)
11. (Italy) Jannik Sinner (second round)
12. (Canada) Félix Auger-Aliassime (quarterfinals)
13. (Spain) Roberto Bautista Agut (first round)
14. (Australia) Alex de Minaur (second round)
15. (Belgium) David Goffin (first round)
16. (Chile) Cristian Garín (first round)

Click on the seed number of a player to go to their draw section.

== Draw ==
=== Key ===
- Q = Qualifier
- WC = Wild card
- LL = Lucky loser
- Alt = Alternate
- ITF = ITF entry
- PR = Protected ranking
- SR = Special ranking
- SE = Special exempt
- JE = Junior exempt
- JR = Junior Accelerator Programme entrant
- CO = College Accelerator Programme entrant
- NG = Next Gen Accelerator Program entrant
- w/o = Walkover
- r = Retired
- d = Defaulted

=== Finals ===
Quarterfinals
1	(Russia) Daniil Medvedev	6	6
7	(Spain) Pablo Carreño Busta	1	1
4	(Russia) Andrey Rublev	6	3	6
(France) Benoît Paire	2	6	3
8	(Norway) Casper Ruud	1	3
3	(Germany) Alexander Zverev	6	6
12	(Canada) Félix Auger-Aliassime	2	7	1
2	(Greece) Stefanos Tsitsipas	6	5	6

Semifinals
1	(Russia) Daniil Medvedev	6	3	3
4	(Russia) Andrey Rublev	2	6	6
3	(Germany) Alexander Zverev	6	3	7^{7}
2	(Greece) Stefanos Tsitsipas	4	6	6^{4}

Final
4	(Russia) Andrey Rublev	2	3
3	(Germany) Alexander Zverev	6	6

=== Top half ===
==== Section 1 ====
First round
WC	(United States) B Nakashima	5	2
WC	(United States) M McDonald	7	6
(Kazakhstan) A Bublik	3	6	7^{7}
Q	(United States) M Giron	6	3	6^{5}
(Bulgaria) G Dimitrov	6	6
13	(Spain) R Bautista Agut	3	4
9	(Poland) H Hurkacz	6	6^{3}	6
(Spain) A Davidovich Fokina	1	7^{7}	1
Q	(France) R Gasquet	4	4
WC	(United Kingdom) A Murray	6	6
LL	(Germany) D Koepfer	7^{7}	5	6
(Germany) J-L Struff	6^{2}	7	3

Second round
1	(Russia) D Medvedev	6	6
WC	(United States) M McDonald	2	2
(Kazakhstan) A Bublik	3	5
(Bulgaria) G Dimitrov	6	7
9	(Poland) H Hurkacz	7^{7}	6
WC	(United Kingdom) A Murray	6^{4}	3
LL	(Germany) D Koepfer	4	2
7	(Spain) P Carreño Busta	6	6

Third round
1	(Russia) D Medvedev	6	6
(Bulgaria) G Dimitrov	3	3
9	(Poland) H Hurkacz	6^{6}	6^{3}
7	(Spain) P Carreño Busta	7^{8}	7^{7}

Quarterfinals
1	(Russia) D Medvedev	6	6
7	(Spain) P Carreño Busta	1	1

==== Section 2 ====
First round
(Russia) A Karatsev	5	3
(Croatia) M Čilić	7	6
(Serbia) D Lajović	6^{0}	2
(France) G Monfils	7^{7}	6
(Serbia) F Krajinović	6	4	4
14	(Australia) A de Minaur	0	6	6
11	(Italy) J Sinner	6	7
(Argentina) F Delbonis	2	5
(United States) J Isner	4	7^{7}	6
(United Kingdom) C Norrie	6	6^{5}	4
(Serbia) M Kecmanović	7	3	2
(France) B Paire	5	6	6

Second round
4	(Russia) A Rublev	5	6	6
(Croatia) M Čilić	7	3	1
(France) G Monfils	6	7
14	(Australia) A de Minaur	3	5
11	(Italy) J Sinner	7	6^{4}	4
(United States) J Isner	5	7^{7}	6
(France) B Paire	6	4	7
6	(Canada) D Shapovalov	3	6	5

Third round
4	(Russia) A Rublev	7^{7}	7^{7}
(France) G Monfils	6^{2}	6^{5}
(United States) J Isner	6^{1}	7^{7}	1
(France) B Paire	7^{7}	6^{2}	6

Quarterfinals
4	(Russia) A Rublev	6	3	6
(France) B Paire	2	6	3

=== Bottom half ===
==== Section 3 ====
First round
(United States) R Opelka	7^{7}	4	6
Q	(France) C Moutet	6^{3}	6	4
WC	(United States) F Tiafoe	7	7^{11}
(France) U Humbert	5	6^{9}
(United Kingdom) D Evans	2	6	3
10	(Argentina) D Schwartzman	6	4	6
15	(Belgium) D Goffin	3	3
PR	(Argentina) G Pella	6	6
(Italy) F Fognini	7^{7}	6
(Georgia (country)) N Basilashvili	6^{3}	3
Q	(Japan) Y Nishioka	3	4
(South Africa) L Harris	6	6

Second round
8	(Norway) C Ruud	6^{5}	6	7^{7}
(United States) R Opelka	7^{7}	0	6^{4}
WC	(United States) F Tiafoe	1	6	4
10	(Argentina) D Schwartzman	6	4	6
PR	(Argentina) G Pella	6	7
(Italy) F Fognini	1	5
(South Africa) L Harris	6^{3}	2
3	(Germany) A Zverev	7^{7}	6

Third round
8	(Norway) C Ruud	6	6
10	(Argentina) D Schwartzman	4	3
PR	(Argentina) G Pella	2	3
3	(Germany) A Zverev	6	6

Quarterfinals
8	(Norway) C Ruud	1	3
3	(Germany) A Zverev	6	6

==== Section 4 ====
First round
(United States) T Fritz	6	4	4
(Spain) A Ramos Viñolas	4	6	6
Q	(South Africa) K Anderson	2	4
(Russia) K Khachanov	6	6
(Hungary) M Fucsovics	6^{0}	3
12	(Canada) F Auger-Aliassime	7^{7}	6
16	(Chile) C Garín	6	3	4
Q	(United States) T Paul	4	6	6
(Italy) L Sonego	6	7^{8}
Q	(Spain) C Alcaraz	3	6^{6}
(United States) S Korda	6	6
(Serbia) L Đere	4	4

Second round
5	(Italy) M Berrettini	6^{5}	6	7
(Spain) A Ramos Viñolas	7^{7}	3	5
(Russia) K Khachanov	7^{7}	3	4
12	(Canada) F Auger-Aliassime	6^{5}	6	6
Q	(United States) T Paul	6^{9}	2
(Italy) L Sonego	7^{11}	6
(United States) S Korda	6^{5}	3
2	(Greece) S Tsitsipas	7^{7}	6

Third round
5	(Italy) M Berrettini	4	3
12	(Canada) F Auger-Aliassime	6	6
(Italy) L Sonego	7	3	4
2	(Greece) S Tsitsipas	5	6	6

Quarterfinals
12	(Canada) F Auger-Aliassime	2	7	1
2	(Greece) S Tsitsipas	6	5	6

== Qualifying ==
=== Seeds ===
1. (France) Richard Gasquet (qualified)
2. (Spain) Carlos Alcaraz (qualified)
3. (United States) Tommy Paul (qualified)
4. (Japan) Yoshihito Nishioka (qualified)
5. (Germany) Dominik Koepfer (qualifying competition, lucky loser)
6. (Canada) Vasek Pospisil (first round)
7. (Italy) Lorenzo Musetti (first round)
8. (United States) Marcos Giron (qualified)
9. (Belarus) Ilya Ivashka (qualifying competition)
10. (Spain) Jaume Munar (qualifying competition)
11. (France) Jérémy Chardy (first round)
12. (Italy) Gianluca Mager (first round)
13. (Finland) Emil Ruusuvuori (first round)
14. (Australia) Alexei Popyrin (qualifying competition)

=== Qualifiers ===
1. (France) Richard Gasquet
2. (Spain) Carlos Alcaraz
3. (United States) Tommy Paul
4. (Japan) Yoshihito Nishioka
5. (United States) Marcos Giron
6. (France) Corentin Moutet
7. (South Africa) Kevin Anderson

=== Lucky loser ===
1. (Germany) Dominik Koepfer

=== Qualifying draw ===
==== First qualifier ====
First round
1	(France) Richard Gasquet	6	6
WC	(Spain) Fernando Verdasco	4	0
(Slovakia) Norbert Gombos	2	2
10	(Spain) Jaume Munar	6	6

Qualifying competition
1	(France) Richard Gasquet	5	6	6
10	(Spain) Jaume Munar	7	4	4

==== Second qualifier ====
First round
2	(Spain) Carlos Alcaraz	6	6
(Brazil) Thiago Monteiro	2	3
WC	(United States) Mitchell Krueger	3	6	3
9	(Belarus) Ilya Ivashka	6	3	6

Qualifying competition
2	(Spain) Carlos Alcaraz	6	6
9	(Belarus) Ilya Ivashka	3	4

==== Third qualifier ====
First round
3	(United States) Tommy Paul	6	6
(South Korea) Kwon Soon-woo	3	2
(United States) Tennys Sandgren	7^{8}	6
11	(France) Jérémy Chardy	6^{6}	1

Qualifying competition
3	(United States) Tommy Paul	6^{5}	7^{7}	6
(United States) Tennys Sandgren	7^{7}	6^{4}	3

==== Fourth qualifier ====
First round
4	(Japan) Yoshihito Nishioka	6	6
(Belarus) Egor Gerasimov	2	3
(Lithuania) Ričardas Berankis	6	7
12	(Italy) Gianluca Mager	4	5

Qualifying competition
4	(Japan) Yoshihito Nishioka	6^{6}	7	6
(Lithuania) Ričardas Berankis	7^{8}	5	2

==== Fifth qualifier ====
First round
5	(Germany) Dominik Koepfer	2	6	6
(Italy) Andreas Seppi	6	4	4
WC	(United States) J. J. Wolf	3	3
8	(United States) Marcos Giron	6	6

Qualifying competition
5	(Germany) Dominik Koepfer	6^{6}	4
8	(United States) Marcos Giron	7^{8}	6

==== Sixth qualifier ====
First round
6	(Canada) Vasek Pospisil	2	2
(France) Corentin Moutet	6	6
WC	(United States) Jack Sock	2^{r}
14/Alt	(Australia) Alexei Popyrin	4

Qualifying competition
(France) Corentin Moutet	3	7^{7}	7
14/Alt	(Australia) Alexei Popyrin	6	6^{2}	5

==== Seventh qualifier ====
First round
7	(Italy) Lorenzo Musetti	3	3
(South Africa) Kevin Anderson	6	6
(United States) Steve Johnson	6^{4}	6	6
13	(Finland) Emil Ruusuvuori	7^{7}	2	3

Qualifying competition
(South Africa) Kevin Anderson	7^{7}	6
(United States) Steve Johnson	6^{3}	4
