= 2010 Heineken Open – Singles =

Singles
- 2010 Heineken Open

Final
- Champion: (United States) John Isner
- Runner-up: (France) Arnaud Clément
- Score: 6–3, 5–7, 7–6^{(7–2)}

Details
- Draw: 28 (4 Q / 3 WC )
- Seeds: 8

Events
Singles	Doubles
← 2009 ·	ATP Auckland Open	· 2011 →

Juan Martín del Potro was the defending champion, but chose not to compete.

John Isner won in the final, 6–3, 5–7, 7–6^{(7–2)}, against Arnaud Clément.

== Seeds ==
The top four seeds receive a bye to the second round.

1. (Spain) Tommy Robredo (quarterfinals)
2. (Spain) David Ferrer (second round)
3. (Spain) Juan Carlos Ferrero (second round, retired because of a right ankle sprain)
4. (Spain) Nicolás Almagro (second round)
5. (Germany) Philipp Kohlschreiber (semifinals)
6. (Austria) Jürgen Melzer (quarterfinals)
7. (Argentina) Juan Mónaco (second round)
8. (Spain) Albert Montañés (semifinals)

== Draw ==
=== Key ===
- Q = Qualifier
- WC = Wild card
- LL = Lucky loser
- Alt = Alternate
- SE = Special exempt
- PR = Protected ranking
- ITF = ITF entry
- JE = Junior exempt
- w/o = Walkover
- r = Retired
- d = Defaulted
- SR = Special ranking

=== Finals ===
Semifinals
(United States) John Isner	6	7^{7}
8	(Spain) Albert Montañés	2	6^{5}
5	(Germany) Philipp Kohlschreiber	3	6^{2}
(France) Arnaud Clément	6	7^{7}

Final
(United States) John Isner	6	5	7^{7}
(France) Arnaud Clément	3	7	6^{2}

=== Top half ===
First round
(Germany) S Greul	6	6
Q	(Italy) P Lorenzi	3	3
(United States) J Isner	4	7^{7}	6
(Spain) G García López	6	6^{3}	2
(Argentina) H Zeballos	3	0
7	(Argentina) J Mónaco	6	6
Q	(United Kingdom) D Evans	6	2	4
Q	(Switzerland) M Lammer	1	6	6
WC	(New Zealand) D King-Turner	2	5
WC	(New Zealand) J Statham	6	7
Q	(Australia) J Lemke	1	5
8	(Spain) A Montañés	6	7

Second round
1	(Spain) T Robredo	7^{7}	7^{7}
(Germany) S Greul	6^{1}	6^{2}
(United States) J Isner	5	6	6
7	(Argentina) J Mónaco	7	4	3
3	(Spain) JC Ferrero	1^{r}
Q	(Switzerland) M Lammer	3
WC	(New Zealand) J Statham	6^{8}	2
8	(Spain) A Montañés	7^{10}	6

Quarterfinals
1	(Spain) T Robredo	6^{5}	6	4
(United States) J Isner	7^{7}	3	6
Q	(Switzerland) M Lammer	3	3
8	(Spain) A Montañés	6	6

Semifinals
(United States) J Isner	6	7^{7}
8	(Spain) A Montañés	2	6^{5}

=== Bottom half ===
First round
5	(Germany) P Kohlschreiber	6	6
LL	(Spain) I Cervantes-Huegun	2	3
(Brazil) T Bellucci	6	6
(Switzerland) M Chiudinelli	3	3
(France) M Gicquel	6	6
(Belgium) O Rochus	3	2
6	(Austria) J Melzer	5	6	6
(Italy) F Fognini	7	3	2
(Germany) F Mayer	3	6	3
WC	(France) S Grosjean	6	3	6
(France) J Chardy	5	4
(France) A Clément	7	6

Second round
5	(Germany) P Kohlschreiber	6	6
(Brazil) T Bellucci	4	1
(France) M Gicquel	6	6
4	(Spain) N Almagro	0	3
6	(Austria) J Melzer	6	6^{5}	7^{7}
WC	(France) S Grosjean	2	7^{7}	6^{1}
(France) A Clément	7	6
2	(Spain) D Ferrer	5	4

Quarterfinals
5	(Germany) P Kohlschreiber	6	6
(France) M Gicquel	3	1
6	(Austria) J Melzer	2	5
(France) A Clément	6	7

Semifinals
5	(Germany) P Kohlschreiber	3	6^{2}
(France) A Clément	6	7^{7}

== Qualifying ==
All seeded players received a bye into the second round, and all players playing in the fourth qualifier received a bye into the second round.

=== Seeds ===
1. (Italy) Paolo Lorenzi (qualified)
2. (Switzerland) Michael Lammer (qualified)
3. (Spain) Íñigo Cervantes (qualifying competition, lucky loser)
4. (Czech Republic) Jan Minář (second round)
5. (United Kingdom) Daniel Evans (qualified)
6. (Spain) Carles Poch Gradin (qualifying competition)
7. (Spain) Guillermo Olaso (qualifying competition)
8. (Spain) Pedro Clar-Rossello (second round)

=== Qualifiers ===
1. (Italy) Paolo Lorenzi
2. (Switzerland) Michael Lammer
3. (Australia) James Lemke
4. (United Kingdom) Daniel Evans

=== Draw ===
==== First qualifier ====
First round				Second round				Qualifying competition
				1	(Italy) Paolo Lorenzi	6	6
(New Zealand) Michael Venus	7	4	4		(Brazil) André Sá	3	3
(Brazil) André Sá	5	6	6					1	(Italy) Paolo Lorenzi	6	7^{7}
(New Zealand) Sebastian Lavie	5	6	1					6	(Spain) Carles Poch Gradin	4	6^{3}
(Spain) Pablo Santos	7	3	6		(Spain) Pablo Santos	5	4
				6	(Spain) Carles Poch Gradin	7	6

==== Second qualifier ====
First round				Second round				Qualifying competition
				2	(Switzerland) Michael Lammer	6	6
WC	(New Zealand) Logan Mackenzie	6	6	WC	(New Zealand) Logan Mackenzie	3	4
	(New Zealand) William Ward	1	3					2	(Switzerland) Michael Lammer	6	6
(Spain) Roberto Bautista Agut		6	6					7	(Spain) Guillermo Olaso	3	4
(Brazil) Bruno Soares		2	3		(Spain) Roberto Bautista Agut	3	6^{3}
				7	(Spain) Guillermo Olaso	6	7^{7}

==== Third qualifier ====
First round				Second round					Qualifying competition
				3	(Spain) Íñigo Cervantes	7	6
(Germany) Michael Kohlmann	0	7^{8}	2		(New Zealand) Mikal Statham	5	2
(New Zealand) Mikal Statham	6	6^{6}	6						3	(Spain) Íñigo Cervantes	2	6	3
(Australia) James Lemke	7	6								(Australia) James Lemke	6	4	6
(Brazil) Marcelo Melo	5	0			(Australia) James Lemke	7^{7}	4	6
				8	(Spain) Pedro Clar-Rossello	6^{4}	6	3

==== Fourth qualifier ====
First round	Second round					Qualifying competition
	4	(Czech Republic) Jan Minář	6	2	4
	WC	(Chinese Taipei) Yang Tsung-hua	4	6	6
						WC	(Chinese Taipei) Yang Tsung-hua	4	6	4
						5	(United Kingdom) Daniel Evans	6	2	6
		(New Zealand) Marcus Daniell	2	4
	5	(United Kingdom) Daniel Evans	6	6
