= 2022 Western & Southern Open – Men's singles =

Tennis championship

Men's singles
- 2022 Western & Southern Open

Final
- Champion: (Croatia) Borna Ćorić
- Runner-up: (Greece) Stefanos Tsitsipas
- Score: 7–6^{(7–0)}, 6–2

Details
- Draw: 56
- Seeds: 16

Events
Singles	men	women
Doubles	men	women
- Cincinnati Masters

Borna Ćorić defeated Stefanos Tsitsipas in the final, 7–6^{(7–0)}, 6–2 to win the men's singles tennis title at the 2022 Cincinnati Masters. It was his first Masters 1000 title, and his first title overall since the 2018 Halle Open. Ranked No. 152 in the world and using a protected ranking for entry, Ćorić became the lowest ranked player to win a Masters event (a record later surpassed by Valentin Vacherot at the 2025 Shanghai Masters) since the series' inception in 1990. He defeated five seeded players en route to the title.

Alexander Zverev was the reigning champion, but did not participate due to a long-term ankle injury.

Rafael Nadal and Daniil Medvedev were in contention for the ATP No. 1 ranking. Medvedev retained the top ranking after Nadal lost in the second round to Ćorić.

== Seeds ==
The top eight seeds receive a bye into the second round.

1. Daniil Medvedev (semifinals)
2. (Spain) Rafael Nadal (second round)
3. (Spain) Carlos Alcaraz (quarterfinals)
4. (Greece) Stefanos Tsitsipas (final)
5. (Norway) Casper Ruud (second round)
6. Andrey Rublev (third round)
7. (Canada) Félix Auger-Aliassime (quarterfinals)
8. (Poland) Hubert Hurkacz (second round)

9. (United Kingdom) Cameron Norrie (semifinals)
10. (Italy) Jannik Sinner (third round)
11. (United States) Taylor Fritz (quarterfinals)
12. (Italy) Matteo Berrettini (first round)
13. (Argentina) Diego Schwartzman (third round)
14. (Croatia) Marin Čilić (third round)
15. (Spain) Roberto Bautista Agut (third round)
16. (Bulgaria) Grigor Dimitrov (first round)

Click on the seed number of a player to go to their draw section.

== Draw ==
Key

- Q = Qualifier
- WC = Wild card
- LL = Lucky loser
- Alt = Alternate
- ITF = ITF entry
- PR = Protected ranking
- SR = Special ranking
- SE = Special exempt
- JE = Junior exempt
- JR = Junior Accelerator Programme entrant
- CO = College Accelerator Programme entrant
- NG = Next Gen Accelerator Program entrant
- w/o = Walkover
- r = Retired
- d = Defaulted

=== Finals ===
Quarterfinals
1	Daniil Medvedev	7^{7}	6
11	(United States) Taylor Fritz	6^{1}	3
4	(Greece) Stefanos Tsitsipas	7^{7}	5	6
(United States) John Isner	6^{5}	7	3
9	(United Kingdom) Cameron Norrie	7^{7}	6^{4}	6
3	(Spain) Carlos Alcaraz	6^{4}	7^{7}	4
7	(Canada) Félix Auger-Aliassime	4	4
PR	(Croatia) Borna Ćorić	6	6

Semifinals
1	Daniil Medvedev	6^{6}	6	3
4	(Greece) Stefanos Tsitsipas	7^{8}	3	6
9	(United Kingdom) Cameron Norrie	3	4
PR	(Croatia) Borna Ćorić	6	6

Final
4	(Greece) Stefanos Tsitsipas	6^{0}	2
PR	(Croatia) Borna Ćorić	7^{7}	6

=== Top half ===
==== Section 1 ====
First round
(Netherlands) B van de Zandschulp	6	4	6
(United States) M Cressy	2	6	4
(United States) T Paul	6	6
(United States) J Brooksby	3	2
(Canada) D Shapovalov	7^{7}	6
16	(Bulgaria) G Dimitrov	6^{4}	3
11	(United States) T Fritz	6	6
(Argentina) S Báez	1	1
(Australia) N Kyrgios	7	6
(Spain) A Davidovich Fokina	5	4
(Spain) A Ramos Viñolas	2	3
LL	(Italy) F Fognini	6	6

Second round
1	D Medvedev	6	7
(Netherlands) B van de Zandschulp	4	5
(United States) T Paul	6	4	3
(Canada) D Shapovalov	3	6	6
11	(United States) T Fritz	6	6
(Australia) N Kyrgios	3	2
LL	(Italy) F Fognini	7^{9}	6^{3}	2
6	A Rublev	6^{7}	7^{7}	6

Third round
1	D Medvedev	7	7
(Canada) D Shapovalov	5	5
11	(United States) T Fritz	6^{4}	6	7
6	A Rublev	7^{7}	2	5

Quarterfinals
1	D Medvedev	7^{7}	6
11	(United States) T Fritz	6^{1}	3

==== Section 2 ====
First round
(Serbia) F Krajinović	6	6
(United Kingdom) D Evans	3	4
A Karatsev	7	7
(United States) B Nakashima	5	5
(Slovakia) A Molčan	7	4	2
13	(Argentina) D Schwartzman	5	6	6
12	(Italy) M Berrettini	6^{3}	6	6^{5}
(United States) F Tiafoe	7^{7}	4	7^{7}
K Khachanov	3	4
WC	(United States) S Korda	6	6
(France) B Bonzi	6^{11}	6	6^{4}
(United States) J Isner	7^{13}	3	7^{7}

Second round
4	(Greece) S Tsitsipas	6	6
(Serbia) F Krajinović	3	4
A Karatsev	6^{3}	6	2
13	(Argentina) D Schwartzman	7^{7}	3	6
(United States) F Tiafoe	6	1	4
WC	(United States) S Korda	4	6	6
(United States) J Isner	7^{7}	6^{5}	6
8	(Poland) H Hurkacz	6^{5}	7^{7}	2

Third round
4	(Greece) S Tsitsipas	6	6
13	(Argentina) D Schwartzman	3	3
WC	(United States) S Korda	6^{3}	6	6^{4}
(United States) J Isner	7^{7}	1	7^{7}

Quarterfinals
4	(Greece) S Tsitsipas	7^{7}	5	6
(United States) J Isner	6^{5}	7	3

=== Bottom half ===
==== Section 3 ====
First round
Q	(Italy) L Sonego	6^{5}	6	5
WC	(United States) B Shelton	7^{7}	3	7
PR	(Switzerland) S Wawrinka	6^{3}	7	5
(United Kingdom) A Murray	7^{7}	5	7
(Denmark) H Rune	6^{5}	6	4
9	(United Kingdom) C Norrie	7^{7}	4	6
14	(Croatia) M Čilić	6	6
Q	(Spain) J Munar	3	3
(Finland) E Ruusuvuori	7^{7}	6
WC	(United States) JJ Wolf	6^{2}	2
WC	(United States) M McDonald	6	6
(Georgia (country)) N Basilashvili	0	1

Second round
5	(Norway) C Ruud	3	3
WC	(United States) B Shelton	6	6
(United Kingdom) A Murray	6	3	4
9	(United Kingdom) C Norrie	3	6	6
14	(Croatia) M Čilić	6	6^{5}	7
(Finland) E Ruusuvuori	4	7^{7}	5
WC	(United States) M McDonald	3	2
3	(Spain) C Alcaraz	6	6

Third round
WC	(United States) B Shelton	0	2
9	(United Kingdom) C Norrie	6	6
14	(Croatia) M Čilić	6^{4}	1
3	(Spain) C Alcaraz	7^{7}	6

Quarterfinals
9	(United Kingdom) C Norrie	7^{7}	6^{4}	6
3	(Spain) C Alcaraz	6^{4}	7^{7}	4

==== Section 4 ====
First round
Q	(Switzerland) H Laaksonen	2	2
(Australia) A de Minaur	6	6
(Spain) P Carreño Busta	6	5	6^{4}
(Serbia) M Kecmanović	1	7	7^{7}
Q	(Australia) T Kokkinakis	7^{11}	4	6^{6}
10	(Italy) J Sinner	6^{9}	6	7^{8}
15	(Spain) R Bautista Agut	6^{5}	6	6
(Argentina) F Cerúndolo	7^{7}	4	2
Q	(United States) M Giron	6	6
Q	(Belgium) D Goffin	3	4
PR	(Croatia) B Ćorić	7^{7}	6
Q	(Italy) L Musetti	6^{2}	3

Second round
7	(Canada) F Auger-Aliassime	6	6
(Australia) A de Minaur	3	2
(Serbia) M Kecmanović	5	1^{r}
10	(Italy) J Sinner	7	3
15	(Spain) R Bautista Agut	6	6
Q	(United States) M Giron	3	3
PR	(Croatia) B Ćorić	7^{11}	4	6
2	(Spain) R Nadal	6^{9}	6	3

Third round
7	(Canada) F Auger-Aliassime	2	7^{7}	6
10	(Italy) J Sinner	6	6^{1}	1
15	(Spain) R Bautista Agut	2	3
PR	(Croatia) B Ćorić	6	6

Quarterfinals
7	(Canada) F Auger-Aliassime	4	4
PR	(Croatia) B Ćorić	6	6

== Seeded players ==
The following are the seeded players. Seedings are based on ATP rankings as of August 8, 2022. Rank and points before are as of August 15, 2022.

Points for the 2021 tournament were not mandatory and are included in the table below only if they counted towards the player's ranking as of August 15, 2022. Players who are not defending points from the 2021 tournament will instead have their 19th best result replaced by their points from the 2022 tournament.

Seed	Rank	Player	Points before	Points defending (or 19th best result)^{†}	Points won	Points after	Status
1	1	Daniil Medvedev	6,885	360	360	6,885	Semifinals lost to (Greece) Stefanos Tsitsipas [4]
2	3	(Spain) Rafael Nadal	5,620	(0)	10	5,630	Second round lost to (Croatia) Borna Ćorić [PR]
3	4	(Spain) Carlos Alcaraz	5,045	35	180	5,190	Quarterfinals lost to (United Kingdom) Cameron Norrie [9]
4	7	(Greece) Stefanos Tsitsipas	4,650	360	600	4,890	Runner-up, lost to (Croatia) Borna Ćorić [PR]
5	5	(Norway) Casper Ruud	4,865	180	10	4,695	Second round lost to (United States) Ben Shelton [WC]
6	8	Andrey Rublev	3,630	600	90	3,120	Third round lost to (United States) Taylor Fritz [11]
7	9	(Canada) Félix Auger-Aliassime	3,625	180	180	3,625	Quarterfinals lost to (Croatia) Borna Ćorić [PR]
8	10	(Poland) Hubert Hurkacz	3,435	90	10	3,355	Second round lost to (United States) John Isner
9	11	(United Kingdom) Cameron Norrie	3,065	10	360	3,415	Semifinals lost to (Croatia) Borna Ćorić [PR]
10	12	(Italy) Jannik Sinner	2,975	45	90	3,020	Third round lost to (Canada) Félix Auger-Aliassime [7]
11	13	(United States) Taylor Fritz	2,930	(20)	180	3,090	Quarterfinals lost to Daniil Medvedev [1]
12	15	(Italy) Matteo Berrettini	2,440	90	10	2,360	First round lost to (United States) Frances Tiafoe
13	16	(Argentina) Diego Schwartzman	2,200	90	90	2,200	Third round lost to (Greece) Stefanos Tsitsipas [4]
14	17	(Croatia) Marin Čilić	2,130	45	90	2,175	Third round lost to (Spain) Carlos Alcaraz [3]
15	19	(Spain) Roberto Bautista Agut	1,760	10	90	1,840	Third round lost to (Croatia) Borna Ćorić [PR]
16	18	(Bulgaria) Grigor Dimitrov	1,810	90	10	1,730	First round lost to (Canada) Denis Shapovalov

† This column shows either the player's points from the 2021 tournament or his 19th best result (shown in brackets). Only ranking points counting towards the player's ranking as of August 15, 2022, are reflected in the column.

=== Withdrawn players ===
The following players would have been seeded, but withdrew before the tournament began.

Rank	Player	Points before	Points defending (or 19th best result)	Points after	Withdrawal reason
2	(Germany) Alexander Zverev	6,760	1,000	5,760	Right ankle injury
6	(Serbia) Novak Djokovic	4,770	(0)	4,770	Failure to meet COVID-19 vaccination requirement for entry into the United States

== Other entry information ==
=== Wild cards ===
- (United States) Sebastian Korda
- (United States) Mackenzie McDonald
- (United States) Ben Shelton
- (United States) J. J. Wolf

=== Protected ranking ===
- (Croatia) Borna Ćorić
- (Switzerland) Stan Wawrinka

=== Withdrawals ===
- (Kazakhstan) Alexander Bublik → replaced by (Italy) Fabio Fognini
- (Serbia) Novak Djokovic → replaced by (United States) Brandon Nakashima
- (France) Gaël Monfils → replaced by (Australia) Nick Kyrgios
- (United States) Reilly Opelka → replaced by (Slovakia) Alex Molčan
- (Germany) Oscar Otte → replaced by (Finland) Emil Ruusuvuori
- (Austria) Dominic Thiem → replaced by (Serbia) Filip Krajinović
- (Germany) Alexander Zverev → replaced by (France) Benjamin Bonzi

== Qualifying ==
=== Seeds ===
1. (Italy) Lorenzo Musetti (qualified)
2. (United Kingdom) Andy Murray (moved to main draw)
3. Ilya Ivashka (qualifying competition)
4. (Spain) Pedro Martínez (first round)
5. (Italy) Lorenzo Sonego (qualified)
6. (Spain) Jaume Munar (qualified)
7. (United States) Marcos Giron (qualified)
8. (Portugal) João Sousa (withdrew)
9. (Italy) Fabio Fognini (qualifying competition, lucky loser)
10. (Belgium) David Goffin (qualified)
11. (Brazil) Thiago Monteiro (qualifying competition)
12. (Serbia) Dušan Lajović (qualifying competition)
13. (France) Adrian Mannarino (first round)
14. (Australia) Thanasi Kokkinakis (qualified)

=== Qualifiers ===
1. (Italy) Lorenzo Musetti
2. (Switzerland) Henri Laaksonen
3. (Australia) Thanasi Kokkinakis
4. (Belgium) David Goffin
5. (Italy) Lorenzo Sonego
6. (Spain) Jaume Munar
7. (United States) Marcos Giron

=== Lucky loser ===
1. (Italy) Fabio Fognini

=== Qualifying draw ===
==== First qualifier ====
First round
1	(Italy) Lorenzo Musetti	6^{5}	6	6
(Germany) Daniel Altmaier	7^{7}	4	3
WC	(United States) Stefan Kozlov	3	5
12	(Serbia) Dušan Lajović	6	7

Qualifying competition
1	(Italy) Lorenzo Musetti	6	6
12	(Serbia) Dušan Lajović	4	4

==== Second qualifier ====
First round
Alt	(Switzerland) Henri Laaksonen	6	7
(Japan) Taro Daniel	4	5
WC	(United States) Emilio Nava	3	0
11	(Brazil) Thiago Monteiro	6	6

Qualifying competition
Alt	(Switzerland) Henri Laaksonen	4	6	6
11	(Brazil) Thiago Monteiro	6	3	4

==== Third qualifier ====
First round
3	Ilya Ivashka	6	6
WC	(United States) Jack Sock	2	3
(France) Benoît Paire	6^{2}	1^{r}
14	(Australia) Thanasi Kokkinakis	7^{7}	3

Qualifying competition
3	Ilya Ivashka	5	6	5
14	(Australia) Thanasi Kokkinakis	7	1	7

==== Fourth qualifier ====
First round
4	(Spain) Pedro Martínez	5	6	1
(Chinese Taipei) Tseng Chun-hsin	7	4	6
(France) Hugo Gaston	1	0
10	(Belgium) David Goffin	6	6

Qualifying competition
(Chinese Taipei) Tseng Chun-hsin	6	3	0
10	(Belgium) David Goffin	3	6	6

==== Fifth qualifier ====
First round
5	(Italy) Lorenzo Sonego	7	6
(Australia) John Millman	5	2
(Australia) Alexei Popyrin	5	6^{3}
Alt	(United States) Bradley Klahn	7	7^{7}

Qualifying competition
5	(Italy) Lorenzo Sonego	6	6
Alt	(United States) Bradley Klahn	2	4

==== Sixth qualifier ====
First round
6	(Spain) Jaume Munar	6	6^{3}	6
(Australia) Christopher O'Connell	4	7^{7}	1
(United States) Steve Johnson	6	7
13	(France) Adrian Mannarino	3	5

Qualifying competition
6	(Spain) Jaume Munar	3	6	6
(United States) Steve Johnson	6	3	4

==== Seventh qualifier ====
First round
7	(United States) Marcos Giron	6	6
(United States) Denis Kudla	3	2
(South Korea) Kwon Soon-woo	7	4	6^{3}
9	(Italy) Fabio Fognini	5	6	7^{7}

Qualifying competition
7	(United States) Marcos Giron	7^{11}	7
9	(Italy) Fabio Fognini	6^{9}	5
