= 2006 Heineken Open – Doubles =

Doubles
- 2006 Heineken Open

Final
- Champions: (Romania) Andrei Pavel (Netherlands) Rogier Wassen
- Runners-up: (Sweden) Simon Aspelin (Australia) Todd Perry
- Score: 6–3, 5–7, [10–4]

Details
- Draw: 16
- Seeds: 4

Events
Singles	Doubles
← 2005 ·	ATP Auckland Open	· 2007 →

Yves Allegro and Michael Kohlmann were the defending champions, but Kohlmann did not participate this year. Allegro partnered Stanislas Wawrinka, losing in the quarterfinals.

Andrei Pavel and Rogier Wassen won in the final 6–3, 5–7, [10–4], against Simon Aspelin and Todd Perry.

== Seeds ==
1. (Sweden) Simon Aspelin / (Australia) Todd Perry (final)
2. ~~(India) Mahesh Bhupathi / (South Africa) Wesley Moodie~~ (withdrew)
3. (Argentina) José Acasuso / (Argentina) Sebastián Prieto (quarterfinals)
4. (Argentina) Gastón Etlis / (Argentina) Martín García (first round)

== Draw ==
=== Key ===
- Q = Qualifier
- WC = Wild card
- LL = Lucky loser
- Alt = Alternate
- SE = Special exempt
- PR = Protected ranking
- ITF = ITF entry
- JE = Junior exempt
- w/o = Walkover
- r = Retired
- d = Defaulted
- SR = Special ranking

=== Draw ===
First round
1	(Sweden) S Aspelin (Australia) T Perry	7	6^{7}	[13]
(Czech Republic) P Pála (Czech Republic) P Vízner	5	7^{9}	[11]
(Switzerland) Y Allegro (Switzerland) S Wawrinka	6^{4}	7	[10]
WC	(New Zealand) D King-Turner (New Zealand) M Nielsen	7^{7}	5	[5]
4	(Argentina) G Etlis (Argentina) M García	5	0
(Chile) F González (Chile) N Massú	7	6
(Belgium) C Rochus (Belgium) O Rochus	4	6	[10]
(Australia) J Kerr (United States) T Parrott	6	3	[4]
(Spain) D Ferrer (Spain) A Montañés	3	4
(Romania) A Pavel (Netherlands) R Wassen	6	6
(Italy) D Bracciali (United States) R Ginepri	2	6	[3]
3	(Argentina) J Acasuso (Argentina) S Prieto	6	3	[10]
(Sweden) R Lindstedt (Finland) J Nieminen	6	7
(Slovakia) D Hrbatý (Czech Republic) J Levinský	2	5
WC	(New Zealand) R Statham (New Zealand) A Thompson	1	2
Alt	(Czech Republic) R Vik (Czech Republic) T Zíb	6	6

Quarterfinals
1	(Sweden) S Aspelin (Australia) T Perry	6	7^{7}
(Switzerland) Y Allegro (Switzerland) S Wawrinka	4	6^{3}
(Chile) F González (Chile) N Massú
(Belgium) C Rochus (Belgium) O Rochus	w/o
(Romania) A Pavel (Netherlands) R Wassen	7^{7}	6
3	(Argentina) J Acasuso (Argentina) S Prieto	6^{2}	4
(Sweden) R Lindstedt (Finland) J Nieminen	6	4	[10]
Alt	(Czech Republic) R Vik (Czech Republic) T Zíb	4	6	[12]

Semifinals
1	(Sweden) S Aspelin (Australia) T Perry	6	6
(Belgium) C Rochus (Belgium) O Rochus	3	2
(Romania) A Pavel (Netherlands) R Wassen	6	7^{7}
Alt	(Czech Republic) R Vik (Czech Republic) T Zíb	2	6^{2}

Final
1	(Sweden) S Aspelin (Australia) T Perry	3	7	[4]
(Romania) A Pavel (Netherlands) R Wassen	6	5	[10]
