= 2005 Heineken Open – Doubles =

Doubles
- 2005 Heineken Open

Final
- Champions: (Switzerland) Yves Allegro (Germany) Michael Kohlmann
- Runners-up: (Sweden) Simon Aspelin (Australia) Todd Perry
- Score: 6–4, 7–6^{(7–4)}

Details
- Draw: 16
- Seeds: 4

Events
| Singles | Doubles |
| ← 2004 · | ATP Auckland Open | · 2006 → |

Mahesh Bhupathi and Fabrice Santoro were the defending champions of the doubles event of the Heineken Open tennis tournament, held in Auckland, New Zealand, but did not participate this year.

Yves Allegro and Michael Kohlmann won in the final 6–4, 7–6^{(7–4)}, against Simon Aspelin and Todd Perry.

== Seeds ==
1. (Argentina) Gastón Etlis / (Argentina) Martín Rodríguez (quarterfinals)
2. (Czech Republic) Cyril Suk / (Czech Republic) Pavel Vízner (quarterfinals)
3. (Australia) Paul Hanley / (Australia) Jordan Kerr (first round)
4. (Argentina) Martín García / (Argentina) Mariano Hood (semifinals)

== Draw ==
=== Key ===
- Q = Qualifier
- WC = Wild card
- LL = Lucky loser
- Alt = Alternate
- SE = Special exempt
- PR = Protected ranking
- ITF = ITF entry
- JE = Junior exempt
- w/o = Walkover
- r = Retired
- d = Defaulted
- SR = Special ranking

=== Draw ===
First round
1 | (Argentina) G Etlis (Argentina) M Rodríguez | 6 | 6
WC | (New Zealand) GD Jones (New Zealand) A Thompson | 1 | 4
Alt | (South Africa) J Coetzee (Spain) A Martín | 6^{6} | 5
(Chile) F González (United States) J Thomas | 7^{8} | 7
3 | (Australia) P Hanley (Australia) J Kerr | 3 | 6^{4}
(United States) G Oliver (Czech Republic) P Pála | 6 | 7^{7}
(Sweden) S Aspelin (Australia) T Perry | 6 | 6
(Argentina) J Acasuso (Peru) L Horna | 1 | 1
(Argentina) JI Chela (Argentina) S Prieto | 6 | 7^{7}
WC | (New Zealand) D King-Turner (New Zealand) M Nielsen | 4 | 6^{4}
(Argentina) A Calleri (South Africa) R Koenig | 3 | 6^{7}
4 | (Argentina) M García (Argentina) M Hood | 6 | 7^{9}
(Switzerland) Y Allegro (Germany) M Kohlmann | 6 | 6
(France) J Benneteau (France) C Saulnier | 3 | 3
(Czech Republic) T Cibulec (Slovakia) D Hrbatý | 4 | 3
2 | (Czech Republic) C Suk (Czech Republic) P Vízner | 6 | 6

Quarterfinals
1 | (Argentina) G Etlis (Argentina) M Rodríguez | 5 | 6^{4}
(Chile) F González (United States) J Thomas | 7 | 7^{7}
(United States) G Oliver (Czech Republic) P Pála | 2 | 1
(Sweden) S Aspelin (Australia) T Perry | 6 | 6
(Argentina) JI Chela (Argentina) S Prieto | 7^{13} | 6^{5} | 4
4 | (Argentina) M García (Argentina) M Hood | 6^{11} | 7^{7} | 6
(Switzerland) Y Allegro (Germany) M Kohlmann | 7^{8} | 3 | 7^{7}
2 | (Czech Republic) C Suk (Czech Republic) P Vízner | 6^{6} | 6 | 6^{5}

Semifinals
(Chile) F González (United States) J Thomas | 4 | 4
(Sweden) S Aspelin (Australia) T Perry | 6 | 6
4 | (Argentina) M García (Argentina) M Hood | 7^{7} | 1 | 3
(Switzerland) Y Allegro (Germany) M Kohlmann | 6^{4} | 6 | 6

Final
(Sweden) S Aspelin (Australia) T Perry | 4 | 6^{4}
(Switzerland) Y Allegro (Germany) M Kohlmann | 6 | 7^{7}
