= 1998 Heineken Open – Doubles =

Doubles
- 1998 Heineken Open

Final
- Champions: (United States) Patrick Galbraith (New Zealand) Brett Steven
- Runners-up: (Netherlands) Tom Nijssen (United States) Jeff Tarango
- Score: 6–4, 6–2

Details
- Draw: 16
- Seeds: 4

Events
Singles	Doubles
← 1997 ·	ATP Auckland Open	· 1999 →

Ellis Ferreira and Patrick Galbraith were the defending champions, but Ferreira did not participate this year. Galbraith partnered Brett Steven, successfully defending his title.

Galbraith and Steven won the title, defeating Tom Nijssen and Jeff Tarango 6–4, 6–2 in the final.

== Seeds ==
1. (Argentina) Luis Lobo / (Spain) Javier Sánchez (first round)
2. (United States) Patrick Galbraith / (New Zealand) Brett Steven (champions)
3. (Argentina) Lucas Arnold / (Argentina) Daniel Orsanic (first round)
4. (South Africa) David Adams / (North Macedonia) Aleksandar Kitinov (first round)

== Draw ==
=== Key ===
- Q = Qualifier
- WC = Wild card
- LL = Lucky loser
- Alt = Alternate
- SE = Special exempt
- PR = Protected ranking
- ITF = ITF entry
- JE = Junior exempt
- w/o = Walkover
- r = Retired
- d = Defaulted
- SR = Special ranking

=== Draw ===
First round
1	(Argentina) E Ferreira (Spain) J Sánchez	6	4	6
(United States) J Grabb (United States) R Reneberg	3	6	7
(Ecuador) N Lapentti (Brazil) F Meligeni	7	6
WC	(New Zealand) A Hunt (New Zealand) M Nielsen	5	4
4	(South Africa) D Adams (North Macedonia) A Kitinov	4	7	4
(Netherlands) T Nijssen (United States) J Tarango	6	5	6
WC	(Italy) A Gaudenzi (United States) M Washington	7	6
WC	(New Zealand) J Greenhalgh (Australia) G Silcock	6	4
(Netherlands) J Siemerink (Czech Republic) D Vacek	7	3	7
Q	(Czech Republic) T Anzari (South Africa) C Haggard	5	6	6
(United States) K Kinnear (South Africa) G Stafford	6	3	6
3	(Argentina) L Arnold (Argentina) D Orsanic	3	6	3
(Zimbabwe) B Black (Zimbabwe) W Black	6	7
(Czech Republic) M Damm (Sweden) M Tillström	2	5
(United States) B Coupe (South Africa) P Rosner	2	4
2	(United States) P Galbraith (New Zealand) B Steven	6	6

Quarterfinals
(United States) J Grabb (United States) R Reneberg	6	6
(Ecuador) N Lapentti (Brazil) F Meligeni	2	2
(Netherlands) T Nijssen (United States) J Tarango	w/o
WC	(Italy) A Gaudenzi (United States) M Washington
(Netherlands) J Siemerink (Czech Republic) D Vacek	6	6
(United States) K Kinnear (South Africa) G Stafford	3	4
(Zimbabwe) B Black (Zimbabwe) W Black	6	6
2	(United States) P Galbraith (New Zealand) B Steven	7	7

Semifinals
(United States) J Grabb (United States) R Reneberg	3	6
(Netherlands) T Nijssen (United States) J Tarango	6	7
(Netherlands) J Siemerink (Czech Republic) D Vacek	6	1	3
2	(United States) P Galbraith (New Zealand) B Steven	4	6	6

Final
(Netherlands) T Nijssen (United States) J Tarango	4	2
2	(United States) P Galbraith (New Zealand) B Steven	6	6
