= 1996 BellSouth Open – Doubles =

Doubles
- 1996 BellSouth Open

Final
- Champions: (South Africa) Marcos Ondruska (United States) Jack Waite
- Runners-up: (Sweden) Jonas Björkman (New Zealand) Brett Steven
- Score: Walkover

Details
- Draw: 16
- Seeds: 4

Events
Singles	Doubles
← 1995 ·	ATP Auckland Open	· 1997 →

Grant Connell and Patrick Galbraith were the defending champions but did not compete that year.

Marcos Ondruska and Jack Waite won the final on a walkover against Jonas Björkman and Brett Steven.

== Seeds ==
Champion seeds are indicated in bold text while text in italics indicates the round in which those seeds were eliminated.

1. (Sweden) Jonas Björkman / (New Zealand) Brett Steven (final, withdrew)
2. (France) Guy Forget / (Switzerland) Jakob Hlasek (quarterfinals)
3. (South Africa) David Adams / (United States) Richey Reneberg (quarterfinals)
4. (Czech Republic) Jiří Novák / (Czech Republic) David Rikl (quarterfinals)

== Draw ==
=== Key ===
- Q = Qualifier
- WC = Wild card
- LL = Lucky loser
- Alt = Alternate
- SE = Special exempt
- PR = Protected ranking
- ITF = ITF entry
- JE = Junior exempt
- w/o = Walkover
- r = Retired
- d = Defaulted
- SR = Special ranking

First round

Quarterfinals

Semifinals

Final

1
- (Sweden) **J Björkman**
- (New Zealand) **B Steven**
**7**
**6**

- (United States) K Flach
- (United States) K Jones
6
4

1
- (Sweden) **J Björkman**
- (New Zealand) **B Steven**
**7**
**7**

- (Italy) C Brandi
- (Portugal) N Marques
**6**
1
3

- (Netherlands) T Nijssen
- (United States) G Van Emburgh
6
5

- (Netherlands) **T Nijssen**
- (United States) **G Van Emburgh**
1
**6**
**6**

1
- (Sweden) **J Björkman**
- (New Zealand) **B Steven**
**6**
**6**

4
- (Czech Republic) **J Novák**
- (Czech Republic) **D Rikl**
**6**
**6**

- (Argentina) J Frana
- (Argentina) L Lobo
3
4

- (Czech Republic) M Damm
- (Italy) S Pescosolido
4
2

4
- (Czech Republic) J Novák
- (Czech Republic) D Rikl
6
**7**
3

- (Argentina) **J Frana**
- (Argentina) **L Lobo**
**6**

- (Argentina) **J Frana**
- (Argentina) **L Lobo**
**7**
6
**6**

WC
- (Japan) S Matsuoka
- (United States) M Washington
1
r

1
- (Sweden) J Björkman
- (New Zealand) B Steven

WC
- (New Zealand) A Hunt
- (New Zealand) G Wilson
3
3

- (South Africa) **M Ondruska**
- (United States) **J Waite**
w/o

- (South Africa) **M Ondruska**
- (United States) **J Waite**
**6**
**6**

- (South Africa) **M Ondruska**
- (United States) **J Waite**
2
**6**
**6**

Q
- (United States) V Spadea
- (South Africa) C van Rensburg
3
**6**
3

3
- (South Africa) D Adams
- (United States) R Reneberg
**6**
3
2

3
- (South Africa) **D Adams**
- (United States) **R Reneberg**
**6**
3
**6**

- (South Africa) **M Ondruska**
- (United States) **J Waite**
**7**
**6**

- (Spain) **J A Conde**
- (Spain) **À Corretja**
**6**
**6**

- (Spain) J A Conde
- (Spain) À Corretja
6
2

- (United States) D Johnson
- (United States) F Montana
3
1

- (Spain) **J A Conde**
- (Spain) **À Corretja**
**6**
**6**

WC
- (New Zealand) S Downs
- (New Zealand) J Greenhalgh
**7**
6
1

2
- (France) G Forget
- (Switzerland) J Hlasek
3
2

2
- (France) **G Forget**
- (Switzerland) **J Hlasek**
6
**7**
**6**
