= 1971 Benson & Hedges Centennial Open =

- Date: 7–13 March
- Edition: 4th
- Category: Non-tour
- Draw: 32S / 16D
- Surface: Grass
- Location: Auckland, New Zealand
- Venue: Stanley Street Courts

Champions

Men's singles
- (Australia) Bob Carmichael

Women's singles
- (Australia) Margaret Court

Men's doubles
- (Australia) Bob Carmichael / (Australia) Ray Ruffels

Women's doubles
- (Australia) Margaret Court / (Australia) Evonne Goolagong
← 1970 ·	ATP Auckland Open	· 1972 →

The 1971 Benson & Hedges Centennial Open was a combined men's and women's tennis tournament played on outdoor grass courts at the Stanley Street Courts in Auckland, New Zealand, from 7 March to 13 March 1971. It was a non-tour event (i.e., not part of one of the main men's or women's circuits that year). Bob Carmichael and Margaret Court won the singles titles.

== Finals ==
=== Men's singles ===
(Australia) Bob Carmichael defeated (Australia) Allan Stone 7–6, 7–6, 6–3.

- It was Carmichael's third title of the year and the fourth of his career.

=== Women's singles ===
(Australia) Margaret Court defeated (Australia) Evonne Goolagong 3–6, 7–6^{(5–1)}, 6–2.

=== Men's doubles ===
(Australia) Bob Carmichael / (Australia) Ray Ruffels defeated (New Zealand) Brian Fairlie / (South Africa) Raymond Moore 6–3, 6–7, 6–4, 4–6, 6–3.

- It was Carmichael's second title of the year and the third of his career. It was Ruffels's only title of the year and the fourth of his career.

=== Women's doubles ===
(Australia) Margaret Court / (Australia) Evonne Goolagong defeated (Australia) Lesley Bowrey / (United Kingdom) Winnie Shaw 7–6, 6–0.
