= 1995 Benson and Hedges Open – Doubles =

Doubles
- 1995 Heineken Open

Final
- Champions: (Canada) Grant Connell (United States) Patrick Galbraith
- Runners-up: (Argentina) Luis Lobo (Spain) Javier Sánchez
- Score: 6–4, 6–3

Details
- Draw: 16
- Seeds: 4

Events
Singles	Doubles
← 1994 ·	ATP Auckland Open	· 1996 →

Patrick McEnroe and Jared Palmer were the defending men's doubles champions for the 1995 Benson and Hedges Open, but did not participate in the tournament this year.

Grant Connell and Patrick Galbraith won the title, defeating Luis Lobo and Javier Sánchez 6–4, 6–3 in the final.

== Seeds ==
1. (Canada) Grant Connell / (United States) Patrick Galbraith (champions)
2. (Sweden) Henrik Holm / (United States) Alex O'Brien (first round)
3. (Australia) Mark Kratzmann / (New Zealand) Brett Steven (first round)
4. (South Africa) Gary Muller / (South Africa) Piet Norval (semifinals)

== Draw ==
=== Key ===
- Q = Qualifier
- WC = Wild card
- LL = Lucky loser
- Alt = Alternate
- SE = Special exempt
- PR = Protected ranking
- ITF = ITF entry
- JE = Junior exempt
- w/o = Walkover
- r = Retired
- d = Defaulted
- SR = Special ranking

=== Draw ===
First round
1	(Canada) G Connell (United States) P Galbraith	6	6
(Netherlands) T Kempers (United States) J Waite	3	4
Q	(Germany) M-K Goellner (Germany) C-U Steeb	3	1
(United Kingdom) N Broad (United States) G Van Emburgh	6	6
4	(South Africa) G Muller (South Africa) P Norval	1	7	7
(United States) R Leach (United States) S Melville	6	6	6
(South Africa) C van Rensburg (South Africa) D Visser	6	6
(Sweden) R Bergh (United States) B Shelton	3	3
(South Africa) M Barnard (South Africa) B Haygarth	6	4
WC	(New Zealand) A Hunt (New Zealand) G Wilson	7	6
(Italy) C Brandi (South Africa) M Ondruska	6	6
3	(Australia) M Kratzmann (New Zealand) B Steven	4	2
(Argentina) L Lobo (Spain) J Sánchez	6	6
WC	(New Zealand) S Downs (New Zealand) J Greenhalgh	1	3
WC	(New Zealand) Andrew Batie (United States) V Spadea	2	6	6
2	(Sweden) H Holm (United States) A O'Brien	6	3	4

Quarterfinals
1	(Canada) G Connell (United States) P Galbraith	6	6
(United Kingdom) N Broad (United States) G Van Emburgh	4	2
4	(South Africa) G Muller (South Africa) P Norval	5	7	7
(South Africa) C van Rensburg (South Africa) D Visser	7	5	5
WC	(New Zealand) A Hunt (New Zealand) G Wilson	7	1	3
(Italy) C Brandi (South Africa) M Ondruska	5	6	6
(Argentina) L Lobo (Spain) J Sánchez	6	6	6
WC	(New Zealand) A Batie (United States) V Spadea	2	7	3

Semifinals
1	(Canada) G Connell (United States) P Galbraith	7	6
4	(South Africa) G Muller (South Africa) P Norval	5	2
(Italy) C Brandi (South Africa) M Ondruska	4	4
(Argentina) L Lobo (Spain) J Sánchez	6	6

Final
1	(Canada) G Connell (United States) P Galbraith	6	6
(Argentina) L Lobo (Spain) J Sánchez	4	3
