= 2007 Heineken Open – Doubles =

Doubles
- 2007 Heineken Open

Final
- Champions: (South Africa) Jeff Coetzee (Netherlands) Rogier Wassen
- Runners-up: (Sweden) Simon Aspelin (South Africa) Chris Haggard
- Score: 6–7^{(9–11)}, 6–3, [10–2]

Details
- Draw: 16
- Seeds: 4

Events
Singles	Doubles
← 2006 ·	ATP Auckland Open	· 2008 →

The doubles competition of the 2007 Heineken Open tennis tournament was held on outdoor hard courts at the ASB Tennis Centre in Auckland, New Zealand, between 8–15 January 2007. Andrei Pavel and Rogier Wassen were the defending champions, but Pavel did not participate this year.

Jeff Coetzee and Wassen won in the final 6–7^{(9–11)}, 6–3, [10–2], against Simon Aspelin and Chris Haggard.

== Seeds ==
1. (Sweden) Simon Aspelin / (South Africa) Chris Haggard (final)
2. (Czech Republic) Leoš Friedl / (Germany) Michael Kohlmann (first round)
3. (Argentina) Martín García / (Argentina) Sebastián Prieto (first round)
4. (Switzerland) Yves Allegro / (Sweden) Robert Lindstedt (first round)

== Draw ==
=== Key ===
- Q = Qualifier
- WC = Wild card
- LL = Lucky loser
- Alt = Alternate
- SE = Special exempt
- PR = Protected ranking
- ITF = ITF entry
- JE = Junior exempt
- w/o = Walkover
- r = Retired
- d = Defaulted
- SR = Special ranking

=== Draw ===
First round
1	(Sweden) S Aspelin (South Africa) C Haggard	4	6	[10]
(Argentina) A Calleri (Argentina) JI Chela	6	3	[8]
WC	(New Zealand) J Statham (New Zealand) M Statham	1	4
WC	(New Zealand) D King-Turner (Finland) J Nieminen	6	6
4	(Switzerland) Y Allegro (Sweden) R Lindstedt	1	2
(Czech Republic) P Pála (Czech Republic) D Škoch	6	6
(Italy) D Bracciali (Slovakia) D Hrbatý	6	6
(France) F Serra (France) G Simon	1	1
(Peru) L Horna (Ecuador) N Lapentti	6	6
(Argentina) J Mónaco (Spain) R Ramírez Hidalgo	3	2
(Spain) N Almagro (Spain) D Ferrer	7^{7}	4	[10]
3	(Argentina) M García (Argentina) S Prieto	6^{3}	6	[5]
(Belgium) O Rochus (Belgium) K Vliegen	6	6
(Spain) A Martín (Chile) N Massú	4	2
(South Africa) J Coetzee (Netherlands) R Wassen	6	1	[10]
2	(Czech Republic) L Friedl (Germany) M Kohlmann	3	6	[7]

Quarterfinals
1	(Sweden) S Aspelin (South Africa) C Haggard	6	6
WC	(New Zealand) D King-Turner (Finland) J Nieminen	2	3
(Czech Republic) P Pála (Czech Republic) D Škoch	7	6
(Italy) D Bracciali (Slovakia) D Hrbatý	5	3
(Peru) L Horna (Ecuador) N Lapentti	w/o
(Spain) N Almagro (Spain) D Ferrer
(Belgium) O Rochus (Belgium) K Vliegen	1	3
(South Africa) J Coetzee (Netherlands) R Wassen	6	6

Semifinals
1	(Sweden) S Aspelin (South Africa) C Haggard	6	6^{3}	[10]
(Czech Republic) P Pála (Czech Republic) D Škoch	3	7^{7}	[4]
(Peru) L Horna (Ecuador) N Lapentti	3	2
(South Africa) J Coetzee (Netherlands) R Wassen	6	6

Final
1	(Sweden) S Aspelin (South Africa) C Haggard	7^{11}	3	[2]
(South Africa) J Coetzee (Netherlands) R Wassen	6^{9}	6	[10]
