= 1995 Benson and Hedges Open – Singles =

Tennis competition

Singles
- 1995 Benson and Hedges Open

Final
- Champion: (Sweden) Thomas Enqvist
- Runner-up: (United States) Chuck Adams
- Score: 6–2, 6–1

Details
- Draw: 32 (4 Q / 3 WC )
- Seeds: 8

Events
Singles	Doubles
← 1994 ·	ATP Auckland Open	· 1996 →

Unseeded Thomas Enqvist defeated Chuck Adams 6–2, 6–1 to win the 1995 Benson and Hedges Open singles competition. Magnus Gustafsson was the champion but did not defend his title.

== Seeds ==
A champion seed is indicated in bold text while text in italics indicates the round in which that seed was eliminated.

1. (South Africa) Wayne Ferreira (first round)
2. (Russia) Alexander Volkov (semifinals)
3. (United States) MaliVai Washington (first round)
4. (Spain) Javier Sánchez (second round)
5. (United States) Chuck Adams (final)
6. (France) Fabrice Santoro (first round)
7. (Sweden) Jonas Björkman (first round)
8. (France) Cédric Pioline (quarterfinals)

== Draw ==
=== Key ===
- Q = Qualifier
- WC = Wild card
- LL = Lucky loser
- Alt = Alternate
- SE = Special exempt
- PR = Protected ranking
- ITF = ITF entry
- JE = Junior exempt
- w/o = Walkover
- r = Retired
- d = Defaulted
- SR = Special ranking

First round
1	(South Africa) W Ferreira	**6**	5	3
(Netherlands) **J Siemerink**	2	**7**	**6**
Q	(Australia) J Sekulov	6^{7}	4
(United States) **A O'Brien**	**7^{9}**	**6**
(United States) **V Spadea**	**7^{7}**	**6**
(Sweden) H Holm	6^{4}	3
(Germany) **C Steeb**	0	**6**	**7**
7	(Sweden) J Björkman	**6**	1	5
4	(Spain) **J Sánchez**	**7^{11}**	**6**
(Zimbabwe) B Black	6^{9}	2
(Brazil) L Mattar	1	2
(Switzerland) **J Hlasek**	**6**	**6**
(Germany) **M Goellner**	4	**6**	**6**
(Sweden) J Apell	**6**	3	4
WC	(New Zealand) S Clark	2	2
5	(United States) **C Adams**	**6**	**6**
6	(France) F Santoro	2	**6**	1
WC	(New Zealand) **S Downs**	**6**	4	**6**
(New Zealand) **B Steven**	**7^{7}**	**7^{7}**
Q	(Australia) B Ellwood	6^{2}	6^{5}
(Sweden) **T Enqvist**	**7^{7}**	**6**
(United States) J Stark	6^{2}	3
Q	(Norway) **C Ruud**	**7^{7}**	3	**6**
3	(United States) M Washington	6^{3}	**6**	3
8	(France) **C Pioline**	**6**	**6**
(United States) B Shelton	0	4
(Italy) G Pozzi	3	6^{4}
(Germany) **H Dreekmann**	**6**	**7^{7}**
(United Kingdom) **J Bates**	**7**	**0**
Q	(United States) B Dunn	5	1	R
WC	(New Zealand) J Greenhalgh	4	4
2	(Russia) **A Volkov**	**6**	**6**

Second round
(Netherlands) **J Siemerink**	**7**	**6**
(United States) A O'Brien	5	3
(United States) **V Spadea**	**6**	**6**
(Germany) C Steeb	3	1
4	(Spain) J Sánchez	1	2
(Switzerland) **J Hlasek**	**6**	**6**
(Germany) M Goellner	5	6^{10}
5	(United States) **C Adams**	**7**	**7^{12}**
WC	(New Zealand) S Downs	3	4
(New Zealand) **B Steven**	**6**	**6**
(Sweden) **T Enqvist**	**6**	5	**6**
Q	(Norway) C Ruud	4	**7**	1
8	(France) **C Pioline**	**6**	**6**
(Germany) H Dreekmann	2	3
(United Kingdom) J Bates	2	4
2	(Russia) **A Volkov**	**6**	**6**

Quarterfinals
(Netherlands) J Siemerink	5	2
(United States) **V Spadea**	**7**	**6**
(Switzerland) J Hlasek	6^{5}	6^{5}
5	(United States) **C Adams**	**7^{7}**	**7^{7}**
(New Zealand) B Steven	6^{9}	5
(Sweden) **T Enqvist**	**7^{11}**	**7**
8	(France) C Pioline	4	**7^{7}**	1
2	(Russia) **A Volkov**	**6**	6^{2}	**6**

Semifinals
(United States) V Spadea	6^{9}	**6**	4
5	(United States) **C Adams**	**7^{11}**	2	**6**
(Sweden) **T Enqvist**	**7^{7}**	**6**
2	(Russia) A Volkov	6^{3}	2

Final
5	(United States) Chuck Adams	2	1
(Sweden) **Thomas Enqvist**	**6**	**6**
