= 1995 Benson and Hedges Open =

- Date: 9–16 January
- Edition: 28th
- Category: World Series
- Draw: 32S / 16D
- Prize money: $303,000
- Surface: Hard / outdoor
- Location: Auckland, New Zealand
- Venue: ASB Tennis Centre

Champions

Singles
- (Sweden) Thomas Enqvist

Doubles
- (Canada) Grant Connell / (United States) Patrick Galbraith
← 1994 ·	ATP Auckland Open	· 1996 →

The 1995 Benson and Hedges Open was a men's tennis tournament held in Auckland, New Zealand, and played on outdoor hard courts. The event was part of the World Series of the 1995 ATP Tour. It was the 28th edition of the tournament and was held from 9 January through 16 January 1995. Unseeded Thomas Enqvist won the singles title.

== Finals ==
=== Singles ===
(Sweden) Thomas Enqvist defeated (United States) Chuck Adams 6–2, 6–1

- It was Enqvist's 1st title of the year and the 3rd of his career.

=== Doubles ===
(Canada) Grant Connell / (United States) Patrick Galbraith defeated (Argentina) Luis Lobo / (Spain) Javier Sánchez, 6–4, 6–3

- It was Connell's 1st title of the year and the 12th of his career. It was Galbraith's 1st title of the year and the 20th of his career.
