= 2006 Heineken Open – Singles =

Singles
- 2006 Heineken Open

Final
- Champion: (Finland) Jarkko Nieminen
- Runner-up: (Croatia) Mario Ančić
- Score: 6–2, 6–2

Details
- Draw: 32 (4 Q / 2 WC )
- Seeds: 8

Events
Singles	Doubles
← 2005 ·	ATP Auckland Open	· 2007 →

Jarkko Nieminen defeated Mario Ančić 6–2, 6–2 to win the 2006 Heineken Open singles competition. Fernando González was the defending singles champion of the tennis tournament, held in Auckland, New Zealand.

== Seeds ==
A champion seed is indicated in bold text while text in italics indicates the round in which that seed was eliminated.

1. (Chile) Fernando González (quarterfinals)
2. (Spain) David Ferrer (quarterfinals)
3. (United States) Robby Ginepri (first round)
4. (Slovakia) Dominik Hrbatý (first round)
5. (Croatia) Mario Ančić (final)
6. (Belgium) Olivier Rochus (semifinals)
7. (Finland) Jarkko Nieminen **(champion)**
8. (Spain) Feliciano López (first round)

== Draw ==
Key

- Q = Qualifier
- WC = Wild card
- LL = Lucky loser
- Alt = Alternate
- ITF = ITF entry
- PR = Protected ranking
- SR = Special ranking
- SE = Special exempt
- JE = Junior exempt
- JR = Junior Accelerator Programme entrant
- CO = College Accelerator Programme entrant
- NG = Next Gen Accelerator Program entrant
- w/o = Walkover
- r = Retired
- d = Defaulted

First round
1	(Chile) **F González**	**6**	**6**
LL	(Peru) L Horna	3	4
Q	(Czech Republic) **I Minář**	2
(South Africa) W Moodie	1^{r}
(Denmark) K Carlsen	5	2
(United Kingdom) **A Murray**	**7**	**6**
WC	(New Zealand) M Nielsen	1	2
5	(Croatia) **M Ančić**	**6**	**6**
3	(United States) R Ginepri	6^{1}	**6**	2
(Spain) **A Martín**	**7^{7}**	3	**6**
(Czech Republic) T Zíb	3	4
(Switzerland) **S Wawrinka**	**6**	**6**
WC	(New Zealand) D King-Turner	2	2
(Germany) **F Mayer**	**6**	**6**
(Czech Republic) **R Vik**	**7^{8}**	**6**
8	(Spain) F López	6^{6}	1
7	(Finland) **J Nieminen**	**6**	**6**
(Cyprus) M Baghdatis	2	2
(Italy) F Volandri	0	1^{r}
(United States) **P Goldstein**	**6**	3
(Belgium) **C Rochus**	**6**	**6**
(Argentina) J Acasuso	4	4
(Chile) **N Massú**	**6**	**6**
4	(Slovakia) D Hrbatý	2	4
6	(Belgium) **O Rochus**	**6**	**6**
(Spain) Montañés	2	4
Q	(Czech Republic) **J Hernych**	**6**	**6**
(Romania) A Pavel	1	2
Q	(Netherlands) **R Sluiter**	**6**	**6**
(Italy) D Bracciali	3	4
Q	(Italy) F Luzzi	5	2
2	(Spain) **D Ferrer**	**7**	**6**

Second round
1	(Chile) **F González**	**6**	**6**
Q	(Czech Republic) I Minář	1	4
(United Kingdom) A Murray	3	6^{4}
5	(Croatia) **M Ančić**	**6**	**7^{7}**
(Spain) A Martín	2	2
(Switzerland) **S Wawrinka**	**6**	**6**
(Germany) **F Mayer**	**6**	**6**
(Czech Republic) R Vik	2	2
7	(Finland) **J Nieminen**	**6**	**6**
(United States) P Goldstein	4	3
(Belgium) C Rochus	4	2
(Chile) **N Massú**	**6**	**6**
6	(Belgium) **O Rochus**	**6**	**7**
Q	(Czech Republic) J Hernych	1	5
Q	(Netherlands) R Sluiter	4	3
2	(Spain) **D Ferrer**	**6**	**6**

Quarterfinals
1	(Chile) F González	0	3
5	(Croatia) **M Ančić**	**6**	**6**
(Switzerland) **S Wawrinka**	**6**	**6**
(Germany) F Mayer	3	4
7	(Finland) **J Nieminen**	**6**	**7^{7}**
(Chile) N Massú	3	6^{4}
6	(Belgium) **O Rochus**	**6**	**6**
2	(Spain) D Ferrer	2	0

Semifinals
5	(Croatia) **M Ančić**	**6**	**6**
(Switzerland) S Wawrinka	3	1
7	(Finland) **J Nieminen**	**6**	6^{4}	**7^{7}**
6	(Belgium) O Rochus	4	**7^{7}**	6^{4}

Final
5	(Croatia) Mario Ančić	2	2
7	(Finland) **Jarkko Nieminen**	**6**	**6**
