= 1969 New Zealand Open =

- Date: 29 January – 2 February
- Edition: 2nd
- Surface: Grass / outdoor
- Location: Auckland, New Zealand
- Venue: Stanley Street

Champions

Men's singles
- (Australia) Tony Roche

Women's singles
- (United Kingdom) Ann Jones

Men's doubles
- (South Africa) Ray Moore / (United Kingdom) Roger Taylor
← 1968 ·	ATP Auckland Open	· 1970 →

The 1969 New Zealand Open (also known as the 1969 Benson & Hedges Open for sponsorship reasons) was the first New Zealand Open tennis tournament to be staged as an open tournament (allowing amateurs and professionals to play together). It was a joint men's and women's event and was held at Stanley Street. Tony Roche and Ann Jones won the titles.

== Finals ==
=== Men's singles ===
(Australia) Tony Roche defeated (Australia) Rod Laver 6–1, 6–4, 4–6, 6–3

=== Women's singles ===
(United Kingdom) Ann Jones defeated (Australia) Karen Krantzcke 6–1, 6–1

=== Men's doubles ===
(South Africa) Ray Moore / (United Kingdom) Roger Taylor defeated (Australia) Malcolm Anderson / (Soviet Union) Toomas Leius 13–15, 6–3, 8–6, 8–6
