= 2007 Heineken Open – Singles =

Singles
- 2007 Heineken Open

Final
- Champion: (Spain) David Ferrer
- Runner-up: (Spain) Tommy Robredo
- Score: 6–4, 6–2

Details
- Draw: 32 (4 Q / 3 WC )
- Seeds: 8

Events
Singles	Doubles
← 2006 ·	ATP Auckland Open	· 2008 →

Following are the results of the 2007 Heineken Open singles competition.

Jarkko Nieminen was the defending champion, but he lost in the first round to Olivier Rochus.
David Ferrer defeated Tommy Robredo 6–4, 6–2 to claim the title.

== Seeds ==
1. (Spain) Tommy Robredo (finalist)
2. (Croatia) Mario Ančić (second round)
3. (Spain) David Ferrer (champion)
4. (Finland) Jarkko Nieminen (first round)
5. (Slovakia) Dominik Hrbatý (second round)
6. (Spain) Juan Carlos Ferrero (first round)
7. (Argentina) Agustín Calleri (semifinals)
8. (Switzerland) Stanislas Wawrinka (first round)

== Draw ==
=== Key ===
- Q = Qualifier
- WC = Wild card
- LL = Lucky loser
- Alt = Alternate
- SE = Special exempt
- PR = Protected ranking
- ITF = ITF entry
- JE = Junior exempt
- w/o = Walkover
- r = Retired
- d = Defaulted
- SR = Special ranking

=== Finals ===
Semifinals
1	(Spain) Tommy Robredo	6	6
7	(Argentina) Agustín Calleri	4	0
3	(Spain) David Ferrer	6	4	6
(United States) Mardy Fish	0	6	1

Final
1	(Spain) Tommy Robredo	4	2
3	(Spain) David Ferrer	6	6

=== Section 1 ===
First round
1	(Spain) T Robredo	6	6
(Spain) RR Hidalgo	2	1
WC	(France) G Monfils	4	4
(Spain) A Martín	6	6
(Germany) P Kohlschreiber	6	7
(Peru) L Horna	4	5
Q	(South Korea) J Woong-Sun	4	5
5	(Slovakia) D Hrbatý	6	7
4	(Finland) J Nieminen	6^{3}	1
(Belgium) O Rochus	7	6
WC	(New Zealand) D King-Turner	3	3
Q	(Argentina) J Mónaco	6	6
Q	(France) F Serra	6	1	6
WC	(Ecuador) N Lapentti	3	6	4
SE	(Argentina) JM Del Potro	1	3
7	(Argentina) A Calleri	6	6

Second round
1	(Spain) T Robredo	6	6
(Spain) A Martín	4	2
(Germany) P Kohlschreiber	6	6
5	(Slovakia) D Hrbatý	2	3
(Belgium) O Rochus	5	7	3
Q	(Argentina) J Mónaco	7	5	6
(France) F Serra	4	1
7	(Argentina) A Calleri	6	6

Quarterfinals
1	(Spain) T Robredo	6	5	6
(Germany) P Kohlschreiber	4	7	2
Q	(Argentina) J Mónaco	6	4	3
7	(Argentina) A Calleri	4	6	6

Semifinals
1	(Spain) T Robredo	6	6
7	(Argentina) A Calleri	4	0

=== Section 2 ===
First round
8	(Switzerland) S Wawrinka	6	4	1
(Spain) N Almagro	1	6	6
(Belgium) K Vliegen	7	6
(Serbia) J Tipsarević	6^{3}	0
(Italy) D Bracciali	6	6
(France) G Simon	3	2
(Argentina) G Gaudio	7	3	2
3	(Spain) D Ferrer	5	6	6
6	(Spain) JC Ferrero	4	2
(Chile) N Massú	6	6
(France) N Mahut	6^{2}	3
(Argentina) JI Chela	7	6
Q	(United States) R Kendrick	2	4
(United States) M Fish	6	6
Q	(Czech Republic) L Rosol	3	6^{4}
2	(Croatia) M Ančić	6	7

Second round
(Spain) N Almagro	6^{2}	6	5
(Belgium) K Vliegen	7	2	7
(Italy) D Bracciali	0	1
3	(Spain) D Ferrer	6	6
(Chile) N Massú	5	6	3
(Argentina) JI Chela	7	4	6
(United States) M Fish	6	6
2	(Croatia) M Ančić	4	4

Quarterfinals
(Belgium) K Vliegen	6	3	2
3	(Spain) D Ferrer	3	6	6
(Argentina) JI Chela	6^{3}	6^{8}
(United States) M Fish	7	7

Semifinals
3	(Spain) D Ferrer	6	4	6
(United States) M Fish	0	6	1
