= 1969 New Zealand Open – Men's singles =

Men's singles
- 1969 New Zealand Open

Final
- Champion: (Australia) Tony Roche
- Runner-up: (Australia) Rod Laver
- Score: 6–1, 6–4, 4–6, 6–3

Events
Singles	men	women
Doubles	men	women
← 1968 ·	New Zealand Open	· 1970 →

Tony Roche defeated Rod Laver 6–1, 6–4, 4–6, 6–3 to win the 1969 New Zealand Open singles event. Barry Phillips-Moore was the champion but did not defend his title.

== Seeds ==
Champion seeds are indicated in bold text while text in italics indicates the round in which those seeds were eliminated.

1. (Australia) **Tony Roche (champion)**
2. (Australia) Rod Laver (final)

== Draw ==
=== Key ===
- Q = Qualifier
- WC = Wild card
- LL = Lucky loser
- Alt = Alternate
- ITF = ITF entry
- PR = Protected ranking
- SR = Special ranking
- SE = Special exempt
- JE = Junior exempt
- JR = Junior Accelerator Programme entrant
- CO = College Accelerator Programme entrant
- NG = Next Gen Accelerator Program entrant
- w/o = Walkover
- r = Retired
- d = Defaulted

=== Finals ===
Quarterfinals
1	(Australia) **Tony Roche**	**6**	1	**6**	**6**
(United Kingdom) Roger Taylor	2	**6**	3	2
(South Africa) **Raymond Moore**	2	**12**	**6**	5	**9**
(United States) Pancho Gonzales	**6**	10	4	**7**	7
(New Zealand) **Brian Fairlie**	7	4	**10**	**6**	**6**
(Australia) John Newcombe	**9**	**6**	8	0	3
(Soviet Union) Toomas Leius	3	**6**	**6**	3	5
2	(Australia) **Rod Laver**	**6**	4	4	**6**	**7**

Semifinals
1	(Australia) **Tony Roche**	**6**	9	**6**	6	**6**
(South Africa) Raymond Moore	3	**11**	4	**8**	2
(New Zealand) Brian Fairlie	3	3	**6**	5
2	(Australia) **Rod Laver**	**6**	**6**	3	**7**

Final
1	(Australia) **Tony Roche**	**6**	**6**	4	**6**
2	(Australia) Rod Laver	1	4	**6**	3
