= 1996 BellSouth Open – Singles =

Singles
- 1996 BellSouth Open

Final
- Champion: (Czech Republic) Jiří Novák
- Runner-up: (New Zealand) Brett Steven
- Score: 6–4, 6–4

Details
- Draw: 32 (4 Q / 3 WC )
- Seeds: 8

Events
Singles	Doubles
← 1995 ·	ATP Auckland Open	· 1997 →

Thomas Enqvist was the defending champion but lost in the second round to Jaime Yzaga.

Jiří Novák won in the final 6–4, 6–4 against Brett Steven.

== Seeds ==
A champion seed is indicated in bold text while text in italics indicates the round in which that seed was eliminated.

1. (Sweden) Thomas Enqvist (second round)
2. (United States) MaliVai Washington (quarterfinals)
3. (Sweden) Jonas Björkman (first round)
4. (Switzerland) Jakob Hlasek (first round)
5. (New Zealand) Brett Steven (final)
6. (Spain) Àlex Corretja (second round)
7. (Spain) Francisco Clavet (second round)
8. (Czech Republic) **Jiří Novák (champion)**

== Draw ==
=== Key ===
- Q = Qualifier
- WC = Wild card
- LL = Lucky loser
- Alt = Alternate
- SE = Special exempt
- PR = Protected ranking
- ITF = ITF entry
- JE = Junior exempt
- w/o = Walkover
- r = Retired
- d = Defaulted
- SR = Special ranking

First round
1	(Sweden) **T Enqvist**	**6**	1	**6**
(United States) R Reneberg	3	**6**	0
(Portugal) N Marques	4	3
Q	(Peru) **J Yzaga**	**6**	**6**
(Italy) **S Pescosolido**	**6**	**6**
(United States) V Spadea	2	4
(Romania) A Voinea	3	6^{3}
8	(Czech Republic) **J Novák**	**6**	**7^{7}**
3	(Sweden) J Björkman	5	1
(Japan) **S Matsuoka**	**7**	**6**
(United States) A Krickstein	**6**	6^{1}	4
(Argentina) **J Frana**	3	**7^{7}**	**6**
(Germany) C-U Steeb	**6**	5	6^{5}
(Argentina) **H Gumy**	4	**7**	**7^{7}**
WC	(New Zealand) J Greenhalgh	5	2
6	(Spain) **À Corretja**	**7**	**6**
5	(New Zealand) **B Steven**	**6**	**6**
Q	(South Africa) M Ondruska	2	4
WC	(New Zealand) A Hunt	**6**	3	1
(Norway) **C Ruud**	3	**6**	**6**
(Spain) C Moyá	2	4
Q	(United States) **C Adams**	**6**	**6**
(Czech Republic) **D Rikl**	**7^{7}**	**6**
4	(Switzerland) J Hlasek	6^{2}	2
7	(Spain) **F Clavet**	**6**	**6**
WC	(New Zealand) S Downs	4	3
(France) **G Forget**	**6**	**6**
(Brazil) F Meligeni	0	2
Q	(Sweden) P Fredriksson	**7**	4	2
(Czech Republic) **M Damm**	5	**6**	**6**
(Denmark) K Carlsen	3	3
2	(United States) **M Washington**	**6**	**6**

Second round
1	(Sweden) T Enqvist	5	4
Q	(Peru) **J Yzaga**	**7**	**6**
(Italy) S Pescosolido	2	3
8	(Czech Republic) **J Novák**	**6**	**6**
(Japan) S Matsuoka
(Argentina) **J Frana**	**w/o**
(Argentina) **H Gumy**	**6**	**6**
6	(Spain) À Corretja	3	2
5	(New Zealand) **B Steven**	**6**	**6**
(Norway) C Ruud	3	4
Q	(United States) C Adams	2	**6**	3
(Czech Republic) **D Rikl**	**6**	3	**6**
7	(Spain) F Clavet	3	4
(France) **G Forget**	**6**	**6**
(Czech Republic) M Damm	3	4
2	(United States) **M Washington**	**6**	**6**

Quarterfinals
Q	(Peru) J Yzaga	2	1
8	(Czech Republic) **J Novák**	**6**	**6**
(Argentina) **J Frana**	**6**	**7^{7}**
(Argentina) H Gumy	3	6^{2}
5	(New Zealand) **B Steven**	**6**	**7**
(Czech Republic) D Rikl	4	5
(France) **G Forget**	**7^{7}**	**6**
2	(United States) M Washington	6^{2}	2

Semifinals
8	(Czech Republic) **J Novák**	3	**6**	**7**
(Argentina) J Frana	**6**	4	5
5	(New Zealand) **B Steven**	6^{5}	**6**	**6**
(France) G Forget	**7^{7}**	4	3

Final
8	(Czech Republic) **Jiří Novák**	**6**	**6**
5	(New Zealand) Brett Steven	4	4
