= 1971 Benson & Hedges Centennial Open – Men's singles =

Men's singles
- 1971 Benson & Hedges Centennial Open

Final
- Champions: (Australia) Bob Carmichael
- Runners-up: (Australia) Allan Stone
- Score: 7–6, 7–6, 6–3

Details
- Draw: 32

Events
Singles	men	women
Doubles	men	women
← 1970 ·	ATP Auckland Open	· 1972 →

Bob Carmichael defeated Allan Stone 7–6, 7–6, 6–3 to win the 1971 Benson & Hedges Centennial Open singles competition. Roger Taylor was the reigning champion but did not defend his title.

== Draw ==
=== Key ===
- Q = Qualifier
- WC = Wild card
- LL = Lucky loser
- Alt = Alternate
- SE = Special exempt
- PR = Protected ranking
- ITF = ITF entry
- JE = Junior exempt
- w/o = Walkover
- r = Retired
- d = Defaulted
- SR = Special ranking

=== Final ===
Semifinals
(New Zealand) Brian Fairlie	6	1	6	3	1
(Australia) Bob Carmichael	3	6	4	6	6
(Australia) Allan Stone	6	6	6
(Australia) P Dent	1	0	4

Final
(Australia) Bob Carmichael	7	7	6
(Australia) Allan Stone	6	6	3

=== Top half ===
First round
(New Zealand) B Fairlie	6	6	6
(United States) J Ross	3	4	0
(Denmark) T Ulrich	6	6	6
(Australia) D Turner	1	0	3
(Australia) J Cooper	6	6	6
I Beverly	4	3	3
(South Africa) F McMillan	6	6	7
P Thompson	4	2	6
(Australia) W Bowrey	3	6	6	6
(United States) K Long	6	3	1	2
(South Africa) R Maud	3	7	6	3	7
(New Zealand) R Hawkes	6	6	1	6	6
(Australia) C Dibley	6	6	6
R Keenan	4	1	2
R McGhie	1	2	2
(Australia) B Carmichael	6	6	6

Second round
(New Zealand) B Fairlie	6	6	6
(Denmark) T Ulrich	3	4	0
(Australia) J Cooper	3	4	7	6	6
(South Africa) F McMillan	6	6	5	4	1
(Australia) W Bowrey	3	6	6	7
(South Africa) R Maud	6	4	1	5
(Australia) C Dibley	6	1	0	7	3
(Australia) B Carmichael	0	6	6	6	6

Quarterfinals
(New Zealand) B Fairlie	6	3	6	6
(Australia) J Cooper	3	6	3	4
(Australia) W Bowrey	5	2	7	4
(Australia) B Carmichael	7	6	6	6

Semifinals
(New Zealand) B Fairlie	6	1	6	3	1
(Australia) B Carmichael	3	6	4	6	6

=== Bottom half ===
First round
(South Africa) R Moore	6	6	6
(United States) D Mitchell	4	0	4
(Australia) R Case	7	6	7
(United States) P Gunning	5	4	5
(United States) R Barth	6	6
(New Zealand) J Simpson	1	0	R
(Australia) A Stone	6	6	6
(New Zealand) D Simmonds	0	3	2
(Australia) D Crealy	6	6	6
(Australia) J Ferguson	2	0	2
(Australia) P Dent	6	6	6
(New Zealand) T Parun	2	4	3
(Australia) B Giltinan	6	6	6
P Fletcher	3	3	2
A Burns	1	0	3
(Australia) R Ruffels	6	6	6

Second round
(South Africa) R Moore	7	5	6	7
(Australia) R Case	5	7	0	5
(United States) R Barth	6	2	5	1
(Australia) A Stone	3	6	7	6
(Australia) D Crealy	4	4	5
(Australia) P Dent	6	6	7
(Australia) B Giltinan	6	7	6	6	1
(Australia) R Ruffels	7	6	1	7	6

Quarterfinals
(South Africa) R Moore	1	6	6	7	2
(Australia) A Stone	6	7	4	5	6
(Australia) P Dent	6	2	6	6	7
(Australia) B Giltinan	7	6	2	4	5

Semifinals
(Australia) A Stone	6	6	6
(Australia) P Dent	1	0	4
