= 1968 Wills International =

1968 New Zealand Open
- Date: 31 January – 4 February
- Edition: 1st
- Surface: Grass / outdoor
- Location: Auckland, New Zealand

Champions

Men's singles
- (Australia) Barry Phillips-Moore

Women's singles
- (Australia) Kerry Melville
ATP Auckland Open	· 1969 →

The 1969 Wills International was a joint men's and women's tennis tournament played on outdoor grass courts in Auckland, New Zealand, from 31 January until 4 February 1968. Barry Phillips-Moore and Kerry Melville won the singles titles.

== Finals ==
=== Men's singles ===
(Australia) Barry Phillips-Moore defeated (New Zealand) Onny Parun 6–3, 6–8, 1–6, 6–3, 6–2

=== Women's singles ===
(Australia) Kerry Melville defeated (Australia) Gail Sherriff 8–6, 6–1

=== Men's doubles ===
(Australia) Dick Crealy / (Australia) Barry Phillips-Moore defeated (Canada) Mike Belkin / (Spain) Juan Gisbert Sr. 6–3, 6–4

=== Women's doubles ===
(Australia) Kerry Melville / (Australia) Gail Sherriff defeated (Netherlands) Astrid Suurbeek / (Netherlands) Ada Bakker 6–0, 6–2

=== Mixed doubles ===
(Australia) Gail Sherriff / (Spain) Juan Gisbert Sr. defeated (Australia) Kerry Melville / (Australia) Dick Crealy 7–5, 13–11
