= 2005 Heineken Open – Singles =

Singles
- 2005 Heineken Open

Final
- Champion: (Chile) Fernando González
- Runner-up: (Belgium) Olivier Rochus
- Score: 6–4, 6–2

Details
- Draw: 32 (4 Q / 3 WC )
- Seeds: 8

Events
Singles	Doubles
← 2004 ·	ATP Auckland Open	· 2006 →

Fernando González defeated Olivier Rochus 6–4, 6–2 to win the 2005 Heineken Open singles competition. Dominik Hrbatý was the defending singles champion of the tennis tournament, held in Auckland, New Zealand.

== Seeds ==
A champion seed is indicated in bold text while text in italics indicates the round in which that seed was eliminated.

1. (Argentina) Guillermo Coria (quarterfinals)
2. (Spain) Tommy Robredo (first round)
3. (Slovakia) Dominik Hrbatý (second round)
4. (United States) Vincent Spadea (second round)
5. (Chile) Fernando González **(champion)**
6. (Argentina) Juan Ignacio Chela (semifinals)
7. (Spain) Juan Carlos Ferrero (first round)
8. (Peru) Luis Horna (first round)

== Draw ==
=== Key ===
- Q = Qualifier
- WC = Wild card
- LL = Lucky loser
- Alt = Alternate
- SE = Special exempt
- PR = Protected ranking
- ITF = ITF entry
- JE = Junior exempt
- w/o = Walkover
- r = Retired
- d = Defaulted
- SR = Special ranking

First round
1	(Argentina) **G Coria**	**6**	**6**
(Netherlands) S Schalken	0	3
(France) **C Saulnier**	**6**	**6**
(Luxembourg) G Müller	4	4
Q	(Italy) **F Luzzi**	**6**	**6**
(Argentina) J Mónaco	4	4
(Belgium) **O Rochus**	**6**	**6**
8	(Peru) L Horna	3	1
3	(Slovakia) **D Hrbatý**	**6**
(Spain) R Nadal	3	R
(Argentina) **J Acasuso**	**6**	3	**6**
(France) J Benneteau	1	**6**	4
Q	(Germany) P Kohlschreiber	4	5
(Spain) **A Martín**	**6**	**7**
Q	(Czech Republic) **J Hernych**	6^{1}	**6**	**6**
7	(Spain) J C Ferrero	**7^{7}**	1	3
5	(Chile) **F González**	**7^{7}**	**6**
WC	(United States) J Blake	6^{4}	1
(Argentina) **M Zabaleta**	**6**	**6**
WC	(New Zealand) GD Jones	0	2
(Argentina) A Calleri	**6**	4	3
(United States) **R Ginepri**	2	**6**	**6**
(Spain) D Sánchez	0	0
4	(United States) **V Spadea**	**6**	**6**
6	(Argentina) **J I Chela**	**6**	**6**
SE	(Spain) G García López	2	2
(Brazil) **R Mello**	**6**	**6**
(Sweden) J Björkman	4	1
(Italy) **P Starace**	**6**	**6**
WC	(New Zealand) M Nielsen	4	4
Q	(Netherlands) **R Sluiter**	4	**6**	**6**
2	(Spain) T Robredo	**6**	4	4

Second round
1	(Argentina) **G Coria**	**6**	4	**7^{7}**
(France) C Saulnier	3	**6**	6^{3}
Q	(Italy) F Luzzi	2	3
(Belgium) **O Rochus**	**6**	**6**
3	(Slovakia) D Hrbatý	6^{5}	3
(Argentina) **J Acasuso**	**7^{7}**	**6**
(Spain) A Martín	4	2
Q	(Czech Republic) **J Hernych**	**6**	**6**
5	(Chile) **F González**	**6**	**6**
(Argentina) M Zabaleta	3	4
(United States) **R Ginepri**	**7**	**6**
4	(United States) V Spadea	5	3
6	(Argentina) **J I Chela**	**6**	**6**
(Brazil) R Mello	2	1
(Italy) **P Starace**	**6**	**6**
Q	(Netherlands) R Sluiter	4	2

Quarterfinals
1	(Argentina) G Coria	4	4
(Belgium) **O Rochus**	**6**	**6**
(Argentina) J Acasuso	4	5
Q	(Czech Republic) **J Hernych**	**6**	**7**
5	(Chile) **F González**	**6**	**6**
(United States) R Ginepri	3	4
6	(Argentina) **J I Chela**	**6**	**7^{7}**
(Italy) P Starace	1	6^{5}

Semifinals
(Belgium) **O Rochus**	**6**	**6**
Q	(Czech Republic) J Hernych	3	1
5	(Chile) **F González**	**6**	**6**
6	(Argentina) J I Chela	4	2

Final
(Belgium) Olivier Rochus	4	2
5	(Chile) **Fernando González**	**6**	**6**
