= 1997 BellSouth Open – Singles =

Singles
- 1997 BellSouth Open
- 1996 Champion: (Czech Republic) Jiří Novák

Final
- Champion: (Sweden) Jonas Björkman
- Runner-up: (Denmark) Kenneth Carlsen
- Score: 7–6^{(7–0)}, 6–0

Details
- Draw: 32 (4 Q / 3 WC )
- Seeds: 8

Events
Singles	Doubles
← 1996 ·	ATP Auckland Open	· 1998 →

Jiří Novák was the defending champion but lost in the semifinals to Kenneth Carlsen.

Jonas Björkman won in the final 7–6^{(7–0)}, 6–0 against Carlsen.

== Seeds ==
A champion seed is indicated in bold text while text in italics indicates the round in which that seed was eliminated.

1. (Chile) Marcelo Ríos (quarterfinals)
2. n/a
3. (Spain) Alberto Berasategui (second round)
4. (Spain) Àlex Corretja (first round)
5. (Argentina) Hernán Gumy (quarterfinals)
6. (United States) Chris Woodruff (second round)
7. (United Kingdom) Greg Rusedski (first round)
8. (Czech Republic) Martin Damm (first round)

== Draw ==
=== Key ===
- Q = Qualifier
- WC = Wild card
- LL = Lucky loser
- Alt = Alternate
- ITF = ITF entry
- PR = Protected ranking
- SR = Special ranking
- SE = Special exempt
- JE = Junior exempt
- JR = Junior Accelerator Programme entrant
- CO = College Accelerator Programme entrant
- NG = Next Gen Accelerator Program entrant
- w/o = Walkover
- r = Retired
- d = Defaulted

First round
1	(Chile) **M Ríos**	**6**	**6**
(Morocco) K Alami	2	3
(United States) **J Tarango**	4	**6**	**6**
WC	(New Zealand) S Downs	**6**	2	1
Q	(South Africa) **M Ondruska**	**6**	**6**
Q	(United States) D Caldwell	1	1
(Slovakia) **K Kučera**	**6**	**6**
8	(Czech Republic) M Damm	1	1
4	(Spain) À Corretja	**7^{7}**	6^{5}	4
(Norway) **C Ruud**	6^{5}	**7^{7}**	**6**
(Sweden) **J Björkman**	**6**	**6**
(Spain) C Costa	4	2
(Netherlands) S Schalken	2	6^{7}
Q	(United States) **J-M Gambill**	**6**	**7^{9}**
(Germany) B Karbacher	5	4
6	(United States) **C Woodruff**	**7**	**6**
5	(Argentina) **H Gumy**	**7**	**6**
(Spain) T Carbonell	5	2
(Sweden) **N Kulti**	**6**	**6**
(United States) J Stark	4	3
WC	(New Zealand) A Hunt	**6**	1	3
(Denmark) **K Carlsen**	4	**6**	**6**
(Spain) R Carretero	4	**6**	5
3	(Spain) **A Berasategui**	**6**	3	**7**
7	(United Kingdom) G Rusedski	**6**	3	6^{5}
(Germany) **A Rădulescu**	2	**6**	**7^{7}**
Q	(Australia) T Larkham	2	1
(Sweden) **T Johansson**	**6**	**6**
(Czech Republic) **J Novák**	3	**7^{7}**	**7^{7}**
(Australia) S Draper	**6**	6^{1}	6^{3}
WC	(New Zealand) B Steven	**7**	4	3
LL	(United States) **C Mamiit**	5	**6**	**6**

Second round
1	(Chile) **M Ríos**	**6**	**6**
(United States) J Tarango	2	4
Q	(South Africa) **M Ondruska**	2	**6**	**6**
(Slovakia) K Kučera	**6**	2	3
(Norway) C Ruud	0	5
(Sweden) **J Björkman**	**6**	**7**
Q	(United States) **J-M Gambill**	5	**6**	**7^{7}**
6	(United States) C Woodruff	**7**	2	6^{2}
5	(Argentina) **H Gumy**	**6**	**6**
(Sweden) N Kulti	3	1
(Denmark) **K Carlsen**	**6**	**6**
3	(Spain) A Berasategui	3	3
(Germany) **A Rădulescu**	**7^{7}**	**6**
(Sweden) T Johansson	6^{5}	4
(Czech Republic) **J Novák**	**6**	**6**
LL	(United States) C Mamiit	4	2

Quarterfinals
1	(Chile) M Ríos	**6**	3	3
Q	(South Africa) **M Ondruska**	0	**6**	**6**
(Sweden) **J Björkman**	**6**	**6**
Q	(United States) J-M Gambill	4	0
5	(Argentina) H Gumy	4	6^{5}
(Denmark) **K Carlsen**	**6**	**7^{7}**
(Germany) A Rădulescu	1	4
(Czech Republic) **J Novák**	**6**	**6**

Semifinals
Q	(South Africa) M Ondruska	1	1
(Sweden) **J Björkman**	**6**	**6**
(Denmark) **K Carlsen**	**7^{7}**	**6**
(Czech Republic) J Novák	6^{5}	4

Final
(Sweden) **Jonas Björkman**	**7^{7}**	**6**
(Denmark) Kenneth Carlsen	6^{0}	0
