= 1998 Heineken Open – Singles =

Singles
- 1998 Heineken Open

Final
- Champion: (Chile) Marcelo Ríos
- Runner-up: (Australia) Richard Fromberg
- Score: 4–6, 6–4, 7–6^{(7–3)}

Details
- Draw: 32 (4 Q / 3 WC )
- Seeds: 8

Events
Singles	Doubles
← 1997 ·	ATP Auckland Open	· 1999 →

First-seeded Marcelo Ríos defeated Richard Fromberg 4–6, 6–4, 7–6^{(7–3)} to win the 1998 Heineken Open singles competition. Jonas Björkman was the champion but did not defend his title.

== Seeds ==
A champion seed is indicated in bold text while text in italics indicates the round in which that seed was eliminated.

1. (Chile) Marcelo Ríos **(champion)**
2. (Spain) Félix Mantilla (semifinals)
3. (Slovakia) Dominik Hrbatý (quarterfinals)
4. (Uruguay) Marcelo Filippini (first round)
5. (United States) Jeff Tarango (second round)
6. (New Zealand) Brett Steven (second round)
7. (Czech Republic) Daniel Vacek (first round)
8. (Spain) Javier Sánchez (second round)

== Draw ==
=== Key ===
- Q = Qualifier
- WC = Wild card
- LL = Lucky loser
- Alt = Alternate
- SE = Special exempt
- PR = Protected ranking
- ITF = ITF entry
- JE = Junior exempt
- w/o = Walkover
- r = Retired
- d = Defaulted
- SR = Special ranking

First round
1	(Chile) **M Ríos**	**6**	**6**
(Ecuador) N Lapentti	3	3
(Brazil) F Meligeni	4	**6**	6^{6}
WC	(New Zealand) **M Nielsen**	**6**	1	**7^{8}**
(Denmark) **K Carlsen**	**6**	**6**
(Spain) J Viloca	2	3
WC	(New Zealand) **A Hunt**	**6**	**7^{7}**
7	(Czech Republic) D Vacek	4	6^{0}
4	(Uruguay) M Filippini	**7^{7}**	3	2
(United States) **M Washington**	6^{1}	**6**	**6**
(Zimbabwe) **B Black**	**6**	**6**
(Italy) A Gaudenzi	1	3
Q	(Germany) **C Vinck**	**6**	**7^{7}**
Q	(United States) G Weiner	1	6^{3}
Q	(United States) B MacPhie	**6**	3	2
5	(United States) **J Tarango**	3	**6**	**6**
6	(New Zealand) **B Steven**	**6**	**6**
WC	(New Zealand) T Susnjak	1	2
(Australia) **R Fromberg**	**3**
(Morocco) K Alami	0	R
(Czech Republic) **M Damm**	**7^{7}**	**6**
(Norway) C Ruud	6^{5}	3
(United States) R Reneberg	2	4
3	(Slovakia) **D Hrbatý**	**6**	**6**
8	(Spain) **J Sánchez**	**6**	**7**
(South Africa) G Stafford	4	5
(France) L Roux	**6**	2	3
(Spain) **C Costa**	1	**6**	**6**
Q	(United States) **M Sell**	**6**	2	**7**
(Sweden) M Tillström	3	**6**	5
(Belgium) J van Herck	6^{3}	3
2	(Spain) **F Mantilla**	**7^{7}**	**6**

Second round
1	(Chile) **M Ríos**	**7**	**6**
WC	(New Zealand) M Nielsen	5	1
(Denmark) **K Carlsen**	**6**	**6**
WC	(New Zealand) A Hunt	1	3
(United States) M Washington	0	4
(Zimbabwe) **B Black**	**6**	**6**
Q	(Germany) **C Vinck**	4	**6**	**6**
5	(United States) J Tarango	**6**	1	1
6	(New Zealand) B Steven	6^{4}	3
(Australia) **R Fromberg**	**7^{7}**	**6**
(Czech Republic) M Damm	3	4
3	(Slovakia) **D Hrbatý**	**6**	**6**
8	(Spain) J Sánchez	0	1
(Spain) **C Costa**	**6**	**6**
Q	(United States) M Sell	3	6^{7}
2	(Spain) **F Mantilla**	**6**	**7^{9}**

Quarterfinals
1	(Chile) **M Ríos**	5	**6**	**6**
(Denmark) K Carlsen	**7**	4	1
(Zimbabwe) **B Black**	**6**	2	**7**
Q	(Germany) C Vinck	4	**6**	5
(Australia) **R Fromberg**	**6**	**7^{8}**
3	(Slovakia) D Hrbatý	2	6^{6}
(Spain) C Costa	2	3
2	(Spain) **F Mantilla**	**6**	**6**

Semifinals
1	(Chile) **M Ríos**	**6**	**6**
(Zimbabwe) B Black	1	3
(Australia) **R Fromberg**	**6**	**7^{10}**
2	(Spain) F Mantilla	3	6^{8}

Final
1	(Chile) **Marcelo Ríos**	4	**6**	**7^{7}**
(Australia) Richard Fromberg	**6**	4	6^{3}
