= 1998 Heineken Open =

- Date: 12–18 January
- Edition: 31st
- Category: World Series
- Draw: 32S / 16D
- Prize money: $315,000
- Surface: Hard / outdoor
- Location: Auckland, New Zealand
- Venue: ASB Tennis Centre

Champions

Singles
- (Chile) Marcelo Ríos

Doubles
- (United States) Patrick Galbraith / (New Zealand) Brett Steven
← 1997 ·	ATP Auckland Open	· 1999 →

The 1998 Heineken Open was a men's tennis tournament played on outdoor hard courts in Auckland, New Zealand, that was part of the World Series of the 1998 ATP Tour. It was the 31st edition of the tournament and was held from 12 January through 18 January 1998. First-seeded Marcelo Ríos won the singles title.

== Finals ==
=== Singles ===
(Chile) Marcelo Ríos defeated (Australia) Richard Fromberg, 4–6, 6–4, 7–6^{(7–3)}

- It was Rios' 1st title of the year and the 7th of his career.

=== Doubles ===
(United States) Patrick Galbraith / (Australia) Brett Steven defeated (Netherlands) Tom Nijssen / (United States) Jeff Tarango, 6–4, 6–2

- It was Galbraith's only title of the year and the 34th of his career. It was Steven's only title of the year and the 9th of his career.
