= 1994 Benson and Hedges Open – Singles =

Singles
- 1994 Benson and Hedges Open

Final
- Champion: (Sweden) Magnus Gustafsson
- Runner-up: (United States) Patrick McEnroe
- Score: 6–4, 6–0

Details
- Draw: 32 (4 Q / 3 WC )
- Seeds: 7

Events
Singles	Doubles
- ATP Auckland Open

Magnus Gustafsson defeated Patrick McEnroe 6–4, 6–0 to win the 1994 Benson and Hedges Open singles competition. Alexander Volkov was the defending champion.

== Seeds ==
A champion seed is indicated in bold text while text in italics indicates the round in which that seed was eliminated. NB: There was no 8th seed at this tournament.

1. (Sweden) Magnus Gustafsson **(champion)**
2. (Russia) Alexander Volkov (second round)
3. (New Zealand) Brett Steven (quarterfinals)
4. (South Africa) Marcos Ondruska (quarterfinals)
5. (Canada) Greg Rusedski (first round)
6. (France) Fabrice Santoro (second round)
7. (Spain) Jordi Burillo (first round)

== Draw ==
=== Key ===
- Q – Qualifier
- WC – Wild card
- LL – Lucky loser

First round
1	(Sweden) **M Gustafsson**	**6**	**6**
(Zimbabwe) B Black	2	0
(United States) B Shelton	2	1
(South Africa) **G Stafford**	**6**	**6**
(Germany) D Prinosil	2	3
(Spain) **T Carbonell**	**6**	**6**
WC	(New Zealand) **J Greenhalgh**	**6**	**6**
LL	(Germany) P Kühnen	3	4
3	(New Zealand) **B Steven**	**6**	**6**
(Australia) T Woodbridge	3	4
(Denmark) K Carlsen	2	2
Q	(Mexico) **O Fernández**	**6**	**6**
(Italy) A Gaudenzi	5	5
(Sweden) **T Enqvist**	**7**	**7**
(United States) J Palmer	4	4
6	(France) **F Santoro**	**6**	**6**
5	(Canada) G Rusedski	**7**	6^{2}	2
(France) **R Gilbert**	5	**7^{7}**	**6**
(United States) **P McEnroe**	**6**	6^{8}	**6**
Q	(Germany) M Geserer	3	**7^{10}**	3
(Italy) G Pozzi	**6**	4	2
(United States) **J Tarango**	4	**6**	**6**
Q	(Germany) L Burgsmüller	5	3
4	(South Africa) **M Ondruska**	**7**	**6**
7	(Spain) J Burillo	3	5
(France) **G Raoux**	**6**	**7**
(Germany) **K Braasch**	**6**	**6**
WC	(New Zealand) S Downs	3	4
(Switzerland) **J Hlasek**	**7^{8}**	**6**
WC	(New Zealand) K Evernden	6^{6}	1
Q	(Germany) C Vinck	4	3
2	(Russia) **A Volkov**	**6**	**6**

Second round
1	(Sweden) **M Gustafsson**	**7**	4	**6**
(South Africa) G Stafford	5	**6**	4
(Spain) **T Carbonell**	**7^{8}**	**6**
WC	(New Zealand) J Greenhalgh	6^{6}	2
3	(New Zealand) **B Steven**	**7**	2	**7^{7}**
Q	(Mexico) O Fernández	5	**6**	6^{5}
(Sweden) **T Enqvist**	**6**	3	**6**
6	(France) F Santoro	2	**6**	2
(France) R Gilbert	**6**	5	5
(United States) **P McEnroe**	4	**7**	**7**
(United States) J Tarango	**6**	5	3
4	(South Africa) **M Ondruska**	4	**7**	**6**
(France) G Raoux	4	4
(Germany) **K Braasch**	**6**	**6**
(Switzerland) **J Hlasek**	**6**	3	**7**
2	(Russia) A Volkov	3	**6**	5

Quarterfinals
1	(Sweden) **M Gustafsson**	**6**	**6**
(Spain) T Carbonell	1	2
3	(New Zealand) B Steven	**6**	4	4
(Sweden) **T Enqvist**	0	**6**	**6**
(United States) **P McEnroe**	3	**6**	**6**
4	(South Africa) M Ondruska	**6**	4	4
(Germany) **K Braasch**	**6**	**6**
(Switzerland) J Hlasek	2	4

Semifinals
1	(Sweden) **M Gustafsson**	**7**	**6**
(Sweden) T Enqvist	5	4
(United States) **P McEnroe**	**7^{7}**	3	**6**
(Germany) K Braasch	6^{5}	**6**	3

Final
1	(Sweden) **Magnus Gustafsson**	**6**	**6**
(United States) Patrick McEnroe	4	0
