= 2005 Heineken Open =

- Date: 10–17 January
- Edition: 38th
- Category: International Series
- Draw: 32S / 16D
- Prize money: $401,000
- Surface: Hard / outdoor
- Location: Auckland, New Zealand
- Venue: ASB Tennis Centre

Champions

Singles
- (Chile) Fernando González

Doubles
- (Switzerland) Yves Allegro / (Germany) Michael Kohlmann
- ATP Auckland Open

The 2005 Heineken Open was a men's ATP tennis tournament held at the ASB Tennis Centre in Auckland, New Zealand. It was the 38th edition of the tournament and was played from 10 to 17 January 2005 on outdoor hard courts. Fifth-seeded Fernando González won the singles title.

== Finals ==
=== Singles ===
(Chile) Fernando González defeated (Belgium) Olivier Rochus 6–4, 6–2

- It was González's 1st title of the year and the 6th of his career.

=== Doubles ===
(Switzerland) Yves Allegro / (Germany) Michael Kohlmann defeated (Sweden) Simon Aspelin / (Australia) Todd Perry 6–4, 7–6^{(7–4)}

- It was Allegro's 1st title of the year and the 2nd of his career. It was Kohlmann's only title of the year and the 3rd of his career.
