= 2007 Heineken Open =

- Date: 8–15 January
- Edition: 32nd
- Category: International Series
- Draw: 32S / 16D
- Prize money: $391,000
- Surface: Hard / outdoor
- Location: Auckland, New Zealand
- Venue: ASB Tennis Centre

Champions

Singles
- (Spain) David Ferrer

Doubles
- (South Africa) Jeff Coetzee / (Netherlands) Rogier Wassen
- ATP Auckland Open

The 2007 Heineken Open was an ATP Tour tennis tournament held on outdoor hard courts at the ASB Tennis Centre in Auckland, New Zealand from 8 January until 15 January 2007.

The tournament saw third-seeded David Ferrer claim the first of his three tournament titles this year, in his first hardcourt final.

== Finals ==
(Spain) David Ferrer defeated (Spain) Tommy Robredo, 6–4, 6–2

=== Doubles ===
(South Africa) Jeff Coetzee / (Netherlands) Rogier Wassen defeated (Sweden) Simon Aspelin / (South Africa) Chris Haggard, 6–7^{(9–11)}, 6–3, [10–2]

== See also ==
- 2007 ASB Classic – women's tournament
