= 1997 BellSouth Open =

- Date: 6–12 January
- Edition: 30th
- Category: World Series
- Draw: 32S / 16D
- Prize money: $303,000
- Surface: Hard / outdoor
- Location: Auckland, New Zealand
- Venue: ASB Tennis Centre

Champions

Singles
- (Sweden) Jonas Björkman

Doubles
- (South Africa) Ellis Ferreira / (United States) Patrick Galbraith
← 1996 ·	ATP Auckland Open	· 1998 →

The 1997 BellSouth Open was a men's tennis tournament played on outdoor hard courts at the ASB Tennis Centre in Auckland in New Zealand and was part of the World Series of the 1997 ATP Tour. The tournament ran from 6 January through 12 January 1997. Unseeded Jonas Björkman won the singles title.

== Finals ==
=== Singles ===
(Sweden) Jonas Björkman defeated (Denmark) Kenneth Carlsen 7–6^{(7–0)}, 6–0

- It was Björkman's 1st title of the year and the 13th of his career.

=== Doubles ===
(South Africa) Ellis Ferreira / (United States) Patrick Galbraith defeated (United States) Rick Leach / (United States) Jonathan Stark 6–4, 4–6, 7–6

- It was Ferreira's 1st title of the year and the 4th of his career. It was Galbraith's 1st title of the year and the 30th of his career.
