= 2006 Heineken Open =

- Date: 9–16 January
- Edition: 39th
- Category: International Series
- Draw: 32S / 16D
- Prize money: $405,000
- Surface: Hard / outdoor
- Location: Auckland, New Zealand
- Venue: ASB Tennis Centre

Champions

Singles
- (Finland) Jarkko Nieminen

Doubles
- (Romania) Andrei Pavel / (Netherlands) Rogier Wassen
- ATP Auckland Open

The 2006 Heineken Open was an ATP men's tennis tournament held at the ASB Tennis Centre in Auckland, New Zealand. It was the 39th edition of the tournament and was held from 9 to 16 January 2006. Seventh-seeded Jarkko Nieminen won the singles title.

The semifinals featured a notable match between Nieminen and Olivier Rochus. Nieminen triumphed in three sets after Rochus had saved 10 match points.

== Finals ==
=== Singles ===
(Finland) Jarkko Nieminen defeated (Croatia) Mario Ančić 6–2, 6–2

=== Doubles ===
(Romania) Andrei Pavel / (Netherlands) Rogier Wassen defeated (Sweden) Simon Aspelin / (Australia) Todd Perry 6–3, 5–7, [10–4]

== See also ==
- 2006 ASB Classic – women's tournament
