= 1994 Benson and Hedges Open – Doubles =

Doubles
- 1994 Benson and Hedges Open

Final
- Champions: (United States) Patrick McEnroe (United States) Jared Palmer
- Runners-up: (Canada) Grant Connell (United States) Patrick Galbraith
- Score: 6–2, 4–6, 6–4

Details
- Draw: 16
- Seeds: 4

Events
Singles	Doubles
- ATP Auckland Open

Grant Connell and Patrick Galbraith were the defending champions, but lost in the final this year.

Patrick McEnroe and Jared Palmer won the title, defeating Connell and Galbraith 6–2, 4–6, 6–4 in the final.

== Seeds ==
1. (Canada) Grant Connell / (United States) Patrick Galbraith (final)
2. (Australia) Todd Woodbridge / (Australia) Mark Woodforde (semifinals)
3. (United States) Patrick McEnroe / (United States) Jared Palmer (champions)
4. (Zimbabwe) Byron Black / (United States) T.J. Middleton (first round)

== Draw ==
Key

- Q = Qualifier
- WC = Wild card
- LL = Lucky loser
- Alt = Alternate
- ITF = ITF entry
- PR = Protected ranking
- SR = Special ranking
- SE = Special exempt
- JE = Junior exempt
- JR = Junior Accelerator Programme entrant
- CO = College Accelerator Programme entrant
- NG = Next Gen Accelerator Program entrant
- w/o = Walkover
- r = Retired
- d = Defaulted

=== Draw ===
First round
1	(Canada) G Connell (United States) P Galbraith	6	6
(United States) S Davis (United States) D Pate	4	4
(United States) D Johnson (United States) J Sullivan	7	6
(United States) D Flach (United States) G Van Emburgh	6	1
4	(Zimbabwe) B Black (United States) TJ Middleton	3	1
(Italy) C Brandi (Spain) T Carbonell	6	6
(United States) M Bauer (Germany) D Prinosil	6	7
WC	(New Zealand) S Downs (New Zealand) J Greenhalgh	4	5
(Switzerland) J Hlasek (Germany) P Kühnen	4	7	6
(Argentina) P Albano (Mexico) L Lavalle	6	5	7
(United States) K Kinnear (United States) B Shelton	1	2
3	(United States) P McEnroe (United States) J Palmer	6	6
Q	(United Kingdom) P Hand (United Kingdom) C Wilkinson	2	2
WC	(New Zealand) K Evernden (New Zealand) B Steven	6	6
(South Africa) M Ondruska (South Africa) G Stafford	6	6	1
2	(Australia) T Woodbridge (Australia) M Woodforde	4	7	6

Quarterfinals
1	(Canada) G Connell (United States) P Galbraith	6	6
(United States) D Johnson (United States) J Sullivan	1	2
(Italy) C Brandi (Spain) T Carbonell	0	6
(United States) M Bauer (Germany) D Prinosil	6	7
(Argentina) P Albano (Mexico) L Lavalle	3	4
3	(United States) P McEnroe (United States) J Palmer	6	6
WC	(New Zealand) K Evernden (New Zealand) B Steven	3	4
2	(Australia) T Woodbridge (Australia) M Woodforde	6	6

Semifinals
1	(Canada) G Connell (United States) P Galbraith	6	6
(United States) M Bauer (Germany) D Prinosil	1	4
3	(United States) P McEnroe (United States) J Palmer	6	6	6
2	(Australia) T Woodbridge (Australia) M Woodforde	7	4	4

Final
1	(Canada) G Connell (United States) P Galbraith	2	6	4
3	(United States) P McEnroe (United States) J Palmer	6	4	6
