= 1996 BellSouth Open =

- Date: 8–14 January
- Edition: 29th
- Category: World Series
- Draw: 32S / 16D
- Prize money: $303,000
- Surface: Hard / outdoor
- Location: Auckland, New Zealand
- Venue: ASB Tennis Centre

Champions

Singles
- (Czech Republic) Jiří Novák

Doubles
- (South Africa) Marcos Ondruska / (United States) Jack Waite
← 1995 ·	ATP Auckland Open	· 1997 →

The 1996 BellSouth Open was a men's tennis tournament held on outdoor hard courts at the ASB Tennis Centre in Auckland in New Zealand and was part of the World Series of the 1996 ATP Tour. It was the 29th edition of the tournament and was held from 8 January through 14 January 1996. Eighth-seeded Jiří Novák won the singles title.

== Finals ==
=== Singles ===
(Czech Republic) Jiří Novák defeated (New Zealand) Brett Steven 6–4, 6–4

- It was Novák's only singles title of the year and the 1st of his career.

=== Doubles ===
(South Africa) Marcos Ondruska / (United States) Jack Waite defeated (Sweden) Jonas Björkman / (New Zealand) Brett Steven by walkover

- It was Ondruska's 1st title of the year and the 3rd of his career. It was Waite's 1st title of the year and the 2nd of his career.
