= 1997 BellSouth Open – Doubles =

Doubles
- 1997 BellSouth Open

Final
- Champions: (South Africa) Ellis Ferreira (United States) Patrick Galbraith
- Runners-up: (United States) Rick Leach (United States) Jonathan Stark
- Score: 6–4, 4–6, 7–6

Details
- Draw: 16
- Seeds: 4

Events
| Singles | Doubles |
- ATP Auckland Open

Marcos Ondruska and Patrick Galbraith were the defending champions but lost in the first round to David Adams and Menno Oosting.

Ellis Ferreira and Patrick Galbraith won in the final 6–4, 4–6, 7–6 against Rick Leach and Jonathan Stark.

== Seeds ==
Champion seeds are indicated in bold text while text in italics indicates the round in which those seeds were eliminated.

1. (South Africa) **Ellis Ferreira** / (United States) **Patrick Galbraith (champions)**
2. (Sweden) Jonas Björkman / (Sweden) Nicklas Kulti (semifinals)
3. (United States) Rick Leach / (United States) Jonathan Stark (final)
4. (South Africa) David Adams / (Netherlands) Menno Oosting (semifinals)

== Draw ==
Key

- Q = Qualifier
- WC = Wild card
- LL = Lucky loser
- Alt = Alternate
- ITF = ITF entry
- PR = Protected ranking
- SR = Special ranking
- SE = Special exempt
- JE = Junior exempt
- JR = Junior Accelerator Programme entrant
- CO = College Accelerator Programme entrant
- NG = Next Gen Accelerator Program entrant
- w/o = Walkover
- r = Retired
- d = Defaulted

First round
1 | (South Africa) **E Ferreira** (United States) **P Galbraith** | **6** | 1 | **6**
WC | (New Zealand) J Greenhalgh (New Zealand) G Wilson | 4 | **6** | 4
WC | (Chile) M Ríos (United Kingdom) G Rusedski | 2 | **6** | 5
WC | (New Zealand) **A Hunt** (New Zealand) **B Steven** | **6** | 4 | **7**
4 | (South Africa) **D Adams** (Netherlands) **M Oosting** | **6** | 6 | **6**
(South Africa) M Ondruska (United States) J Waite | 2 | **7** | 3
(South Africa) M Barnard (United States) D Randall | 6 | 2
(Czech Republic) **M Damm** (Czech Republic) **P Vízner** | **7** | **6**
(Argentina) P Albano (Spain) T Carbonell | 6 | **7** | 3
(Sweden) **D Ekerot** (United States) **J Tarango** | **7** | 6 | **6**
(Netherlands) S Noteboom (Netherlands) S Schalken | 5 | 5
3 | (United States) **R Leach** (United States) **J Stark** | **7** | **7**
(United Kingdom) **N Broad** (South Africa) **G Muller** | **7** | 6 | **7**
Q | (South Africa) J-L de Jager (South Africa) C van Rensburg | 6 | **7** | 6
(Czech Republic) J Novák (Czech Republic) C Suk | 6 | 5
2 | (Sweden) **J Björkman** (Sweden) **N Kulti** | **7** | **7**

Quarterfinals
1 | (South Africa) **E Ferreira** (United States) **P Galbraith** | **6** | **6**
WC | (New Zealand) A Hunt (New Zealand) B Steven | 2 | 4
4 | (South Africa) **D Adams** (Netherlands) **M Oosting** | **6** | **7**
(Czech Republic) M Damm (Czech Republic) P Vízner | 4 | 6
(Sweden) D Ekerot (United States) J Tarango | **7** | 3 | 3
3 | (United States) **R Leach** (United States) **J Stark** | 6 | **6** | **6**
(United Kingdom) N Broad (South Africa) G Muller | 4 | 4
2 | (Sweden) **J Björkman** (Sweden) **N Kulti** | **6** | **6**

Semifinals
1 | (South Africa) **E Ferreira** (United States) **P Galbraith** | **6** | **7**
4 | (South Africa) D Adams (Netherlands) M Oosting | 3 | 6
3 | (United States) **R Leach** (United States) **J Stark** | **6** | **6**
2 | (Sweden) J Björkman (Sweden) N Kulti | 3 | 4

Final
1 | (South Africa) **E Ferreira** (United States) **P Galbraith** | **6** | 4 | **7**
3 | (United States) R Leach (United States) J Stark | 4 | **6** | 6
