= 1994 Benson and Hedges Open =

- Date: 10–17 January
- Edition: 27th
- Category: World Series
- Draw: 32S / 16D
- Prize money: $288,750
- Surface: Hard / outdoor
- Location: Auckland, New Zealand
- Venue: ASB Tennis Centre

Champions

Singles
- (Sweden) Magnus Gustafsson

Doubles
- (United States) Patrick McEnroe / (United States) Jared Palmer
- ATP Auckland Open

The 1994 Benson and Hedges Open was a men's professional tennis tournament held in Auckland, New Zealand, that was part of the World Series of the 1994 ATP Tour. It was the 27th edition of the tournament and was held from 10 January through 17 January 1994. First-seeded Magnus Gustafsson won the singles title.

== Finals ==
=== Singles ===
(Sweden) Magnus Gustafsson defeated (United States) Patrick McEnroe 6–4, 6–0

- It was Gustafsson's 1st title of the year and the 6th of his career.

=== Doubles ===
(United States) Patrick McEnroe / (United States) Jared Palmer defeated (Canada) Grant Connell / (United States) Patrick Galbraith 6–2, 4–6, 6–4

- It was McEnroe's 1st title of the year and the 13th of his career. It was Palmer's 1st title of the year and the 3rd of his career.
