= 1972 New Zealand Open =

- Date: 7–12 December
- Edition: 5th
- Category: Independent
- Surface: Grass / outdoor
- Location: Auckland, New Zealand
- Venue: Stanley Street Courts

Champions

Men's singles
- (Australia) Ray Ruffels

Women's singles
- (Australia) Kerry Melville

Men's doubles
- (Australia) Ray Ruffels / (Australia) Bob Carmichael

Women's doubles
- (United States) Rosie Casals / (United States) Billie Jean King
- ATP Auckland Open

The 1972 New Zealand Open, also known as Benson and Hedges Open for sponsorship reasons, was a combined men's and women's professional tennis tournament held at the Stanley Street Courts in Auckland, New Zealand. It was an independent event, i.e. not part of the 1972 Grand Prix or 1972 World Championship Tennis circuit. The tournament was played on outdoor grass courts and was held from 7 December through 12 December 1971. Ray Ruffels and Kerry Melville won the singles titles.

== Finals ==
=== Men's singles ===
(Australia) Ray Ruffels defeated (Australia) John Alexander 6–4, 6–4, 7–6^{(5–3)}

=== Women's singles ===
(Australia) Kerry Melville defeated (United States) Rosie Casals 6–4, 6–0

=== Men's doubles ===
(Australia) Ray Ruffels / (Australia) Bob Carmichael

=== Women's doubles ===
(Australia) Rosie Casals / (Australia) Billie Jean King defeated (Australia) Judy Dalton / (France) Françoise Dürr 7–6, 4–6, 7–5
