= Adam Thompson (tennis) =

New Zealand tennis player

- Country (sports): New Zealand
- Born: 28 July 1982 (age 44) Hastings, New Zealand
- Plays: Right-handed (two-handed backhand)
- Prize money: $31,544

Singles
- Career record: 3–2 (at ATP Tour level, Grand Slam level, and in Davis Cup)
- Career titles: 0
- Highest ranking: No. 677 (23 August 2004)

Doubles
- Career record: 0–2 (at ATP Tour level, Grand Slam level, and in Davis Cup)
- Career titles: 5 ITF
- Highest ranking: No. 597 (20 March 2006)
- Last updated on: 22 May 2021.

Adam Thompson (born 28 July 1982) is a retired tennis player from New Zealand.

Thompson had a career high ATP singles ranking of 677 achieved on 23 August 2004. He also had a career high ATP doubles ranking of 597 achieved on 20 March 2006.

Thompson represented New Zealand at the Davis Cup, where he had a W/L record of 3–2.

== ATP Challenger and ITF Futures finals ==
=== Singles: 1 (0–1) ===
Legend ATP Challenger (0–0) ITF Futures (0–1)	Finals by surface Hard (0–1) Clay (0–0) Grass (0–0) Carpet (0–0)

Result	W–L	Date	Tournament	Tier	Surface	Opponent	Score
Loss	0–1	Aug 2004	Togo F1, Lomé	Futures	Hard	(Togo) Komlavi Loglo	0–6, 4–6

=== Doubles: 7 (5–2) ===
Legend ATP Challenger (0–0) ITF Futures (5–2)	Finals by surface Hard (1–1) Clay (4–1) Grass (0–0) Carpet (0–0)

Result	W–L	Date	Tournament	Tier	Surface	Partner	Opponents	Score
Win	1–0	Jul 2004	Morocco F2, Marrakesh	Futures	Clay	(Netherlands) Martijn Van Haasteren	(Spain) Jordi Marse-Vidri (Spain) Carlos Rexach-Itoiz	6–2, 2–6, 7–5
Win	2–0	Oct 2004	Rwanda F1, Kigali	Futures	Clay	(Netherlands) Matwe Middelkoop	(South Africa) Andrew Anderson (South Africa) Paul Anderson	6–2, 2–6, 6–4
Win	3–0	Mar 2006	Egypt F1, Cairo	Futures	Clay	(Russia) Mikhail Elgin	(Czech Republic) Jan Mašík (Czech Republic) Michal Navrátil	6–2, 6–2
Loss	3–1	Jul 2007	USA F17, Peoria	Futures	Clay	(New Zealand) Jose Statham	(United States) Troy Hahn (United States) Vahid Mirzadeh	6–3, 2–6, 3–6
Loss	3–2	Aug 2007	Ecuador F1, Guayaquil	Futures	Hard	(New Zealand) Jose Statham	(Peru) Mauricio Echazu (Peru) Matias Silva	6–2, 4–6, 2–6
Win	4–2	Sep 2007	Mexico F6, Monterrey	Futures	Clay	(Iceland) Arnar Sigurdsson	(Germany) Marc Sieber (Germany) Peter Gojowczyk	6–2, 6–1
Win	5–2	May 2009	Mexico F7, Celaya	Futures	Hard	(Canada) Chris Klingemann	(United States) J.P. Ritchie (Germany) Will Gray	7–6^{(7–4)}, 6–3
