= Todd Perry (tennis) =

Australian tennis player

- Country (sports): Australia
- Residence: Adelaide, Australia
- Born: 17 March 1976 (age 50) Adelaide, Australia
- Height: 175 cm (5 ft 9 in)
- Turned pro: 1998
- Retired: 2009
- Plays: Right-handed
- Prize money: $777,545

Singles
- Career record: 0–1
- Career titles: 0
- Highest ranking: No. 385 (9 July 2001)

Grand Slam singles results
- Australian Open: 1R (2001)

Doubles
- Career record: 147–143
- Career titles: 6
- Highest ranking: No. 16 (15 May 2006)

Grand Slam doubles results
- Australian Open: QF (2006)
- French Open: 3R (2005)
- Wimbledon: QF (2004, 2006)
- US Open: QF (2005)

Todd Perry (born 17 March 1976) is an Australian former professional tennis player.

Ascending the ranks and going professional in 1998, Perry competed on the ATP tour as both a singles and doubles player, achieving notable success in his doubles career.

His 13 year professional career saw him play against some of the best in the world, including defeating titans like Nadal and Djokovic and winning six ATP Tour Doubles Titles.

Perry achieved a career-high doubles ranking of World No. 16 in May 2006, partnering primarily with Swedish doubles player Simon Aspelin.

Retiring following the 2008 season, Perry returned to his home town of Adelaide and established the Todd Perry Tennis Academy, acting as director and head coach.

== Career finals ==
=== Doubles 17 (6 titles, 11 runner-ups) ===
Legend Grand Slam (0) Tennis Masters Cup (0) ATP Masters Series (0) ATP International Series Gold (1) ATP Tour (5)	Titles by surface Hard (4) Clay (1) Grass (0) Carpet (1)

Result	No.	Date	Tournament	Surface	Partner	Opponents	Score
Loss	1.	Jul 2003	Umag, Croatia	Clay	(Japan) Thomas Shimada	(Spain) Álex López Morón (Spain) Rafael Nadal	1–6, 3–6
Win	1.	Sep 2003	Costa do Sauipe, Brazil	Hard	(Japan) Thomas Shimada	(United States) Scott Humphries (The Bahamas) Mark Merklein	6–2, 6–4
Loss	2.	Jul 2004	Båstad, Sweden	Clay	(Sweden) Simon Aspelin	(India) Mahesh Bhupathi (Sweden) Jonas Björkman	6–4, 6–7^{(2–7)}, 6–7^{(6–8)}
Loss	3.	Jul 2004	Stuttgart, Germany	Clay	(Sweden) Simon Aspelin	(Czech Republic) Jiří Novák (Czech Republic) Radek Štěpánek	2–6, 4–6
Loss	4.	Jan 2005	Adelaide, Australia	Hard	(Sweden) Simon Aspelin	(Belgium) Xavier Malisse (Belgium) Olivier Rochus	6–7^{(5–7)}, 4–6
Loss	5.	Jan 2005	Auckland, New Zealand	Hard	(Sweden) Simon Aspelin	(Switzerland) Yves Allegro (Germany) Michael Kohlmann	4–6, 6–7^{(4–7)}
Win	2.	Jan 2005	Delray Beach, United States	Hard	(Sweden) Simon Aspelin	(Australia) Jordan Kerr (United States) Jim Thomas	6–3, 6–3
Win	3.	Feb 2005	Memphis, United States	Hard	(Sweden) Simon Aspelin	(United States) Bob Bryan (United States) Mike Bryan	6–4, 6–4
Loss	6.	Jun 2005	Nottingham, UK	Grass	(Sweden) Simon Aspelin	(Israel) Jonathan Erlich (Israel) Andy Ram	6–4, 3–6, 5–7
Loss	7.	Jul 2005	Indianapolis, US	Hard	(Sweden) Simon Aspelin	(Australia) Paul Hanley (United States) Graydon Oliver	2–6, 1–3 ret.
Loss	8.	Oct 2005	Tokyo, Japan	Hard	(Sweden) Simon Aspelin	(Japan) Satoshi Iwabuchi (Japan) Takao Suzuki	4–5, 4–5
Loss	9.	Jan 2006	Auckland, New Zealand	Hard	(Sweden) Simon Aspelin	(Romania) Andrei Pavel (Netherlands) Rogier Wassen	2–6, 7–5, [4–10]
Win	4.	Oct 2006	St. Petersburg, Russia	Carpet	(Sweden) Simon Aspelin	(Austria) Julian Knowle (Austria) Jürgen Melzer	6–1, 7–6^{(7–3)}
Win	5.	Jan 2007	Adelaide, Australia	Hard	(South Africa) Wesley Moodie	(Serbia) Novak Djokovic (Czech Republic) Radek Štěpánek	6–4, 3–6, [15–13]
Win	6.	Apr 2007	Valencia, Spain	Clay	(South Africa) Wesley Moodie	(Switzerland) Yves Allegro (Argentina) Sebastián Prieto	7–5, 7–5
Loss	10.	Oct 2007	St. Petersburg, Russia	Carpet	(Austria) Jürgen Melzer	(Canada) Daniel Nestor (Serbia) Nenad Zimonjić	1–6, 6–7^{(3–7)}
Loss	11.	May 2008	Casablanca, Morocco	Clay	(United States) James Cerretani	(Spain) Albert Montañés (Spain) Santiago Ventura	1–6, 2–6
