= 1970 New Zealand Open =

- Date: 27 January – 1 February
- Edition: 3rd
- Surface: Grass
- Location: Auckland, New Zealand
- Venue: Stanley Street Courts

Champions

Men's singles
- (United Kingdom) Roger Taylor

Women's singles
- (United Kingdom) Ann Jones

Men's doubles
- (Australia) Dick Crealy / (Australia) Ray Ruffels

Women's doubles
- (Australia) Margaret Court / (United Kingdom) Ann Jones
- ATP Auckland Open

The 1970 New Zealand Open, also known by its sponsored name Benson and Hedges Open, was a combined men's and women's tennis tournament played on outdoor grass courts in Auckland, New Zealand, from 26 January until 1 February 1970. Roger Taylor and Ann Jones won the singles titles.

== Finals ==
=== Men's singles ===
(United Kingdom) Roger Taylor defeated (Netherlands) Tom Okker 6–4, 6–4, 6–1

=== Women's singles ===
(United Kingdom) Ann Jones defeated (Australia) Kerry Melville 0–6, 6–4, 6–1

=== Men's doubles ===
(Australia) Dick Crealy / (Australia) Ray Ruffels defeated (Australia) John Alexander / (Australia) Phil Dent 6–4, 3–6, 6–3, 8–6

=== Women's doubles ===
(Australia) Margaret Court / (United Kingdom) Ann Jones defeated (Australia) Karen Krantzcke / (Australia) Kerry Melville 6–0, 6–4
