= Simon Aspelin =

Swedish tennis player

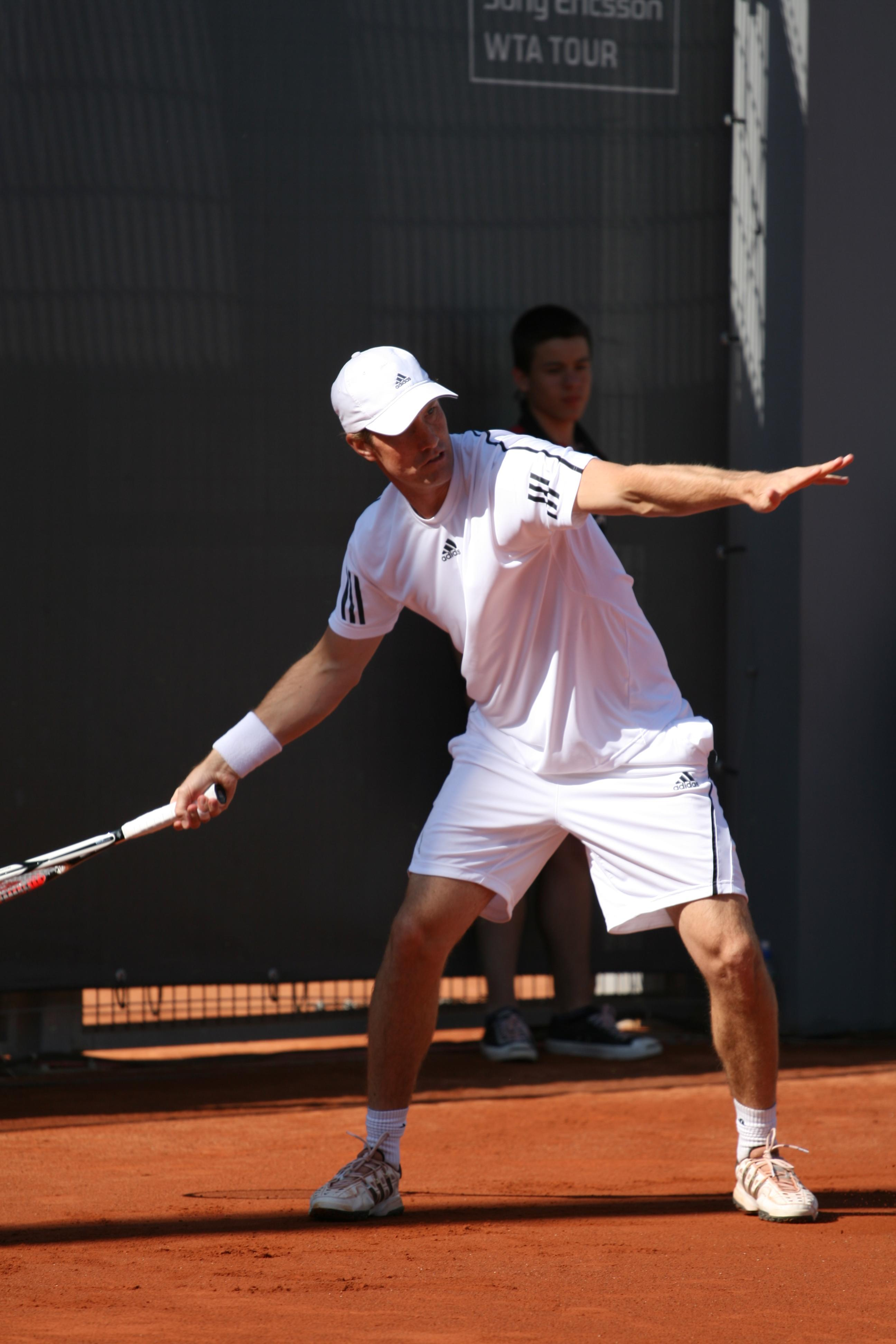
- Country (sports): Sweden
- Residence: London, England
- Born: 11 May 1974 (age 51); Saltsjöbaden, Sweden
- Height: 1.85 m (6 ft 1 in)
- Turned pro: 1998
- Retired: 17 July 2011
- Plays: Right-handed (two-handed backhand)
- Prize money: $2,121,037

Singles
- Career record: 0–2
- Career titles: 0
- Highest ranking: No. 436 (17 August 1998)

Grand Slam singles results
- Wimbledon: Q1 (1998, 1999)

Doubles
- Career record: 348–303 (53%)
- Career titles: 12
- Highest ranking: No. 7 (3 March 2008)

Grand Slam doubles results
- Australian Open: QF (2006)
- French Open: 3R (2005, 2007, 2008, 2009, 2011)
- Wimbledon: QF (2004, 2006, 2009)
- US Open: W (2007)

Other doubles tournaments
- Tour Finals: F (2007)
- Olympic Games: F (2008)

Mixed doubles
- Career record: 14–20
- Career titles: 0

Grand Slam mixed doubles results
- Australian Open: 2R (2006, 2008, 2009)
- French Open: QF (2000)
- Wimbledon: 3R (2008)
- US Open: 2R (2007)
Medal record
Men's Tennis
Silver medal – second place	2008 Beijing	Men's doubles

Simon Aspelin (pronounced [ˈsîːmɔn aspɛˈliːn]; born 11 May 1974) is a former professional tennis doubles player from Sweden who turned professional in 1998. His success mainly came in doubles, winning 12 titles and reaching World No. 7 in March 2008. In men's doubles, Aspelin won the 2007 US Open and the silver medal at the 2008 Summer Olympics.

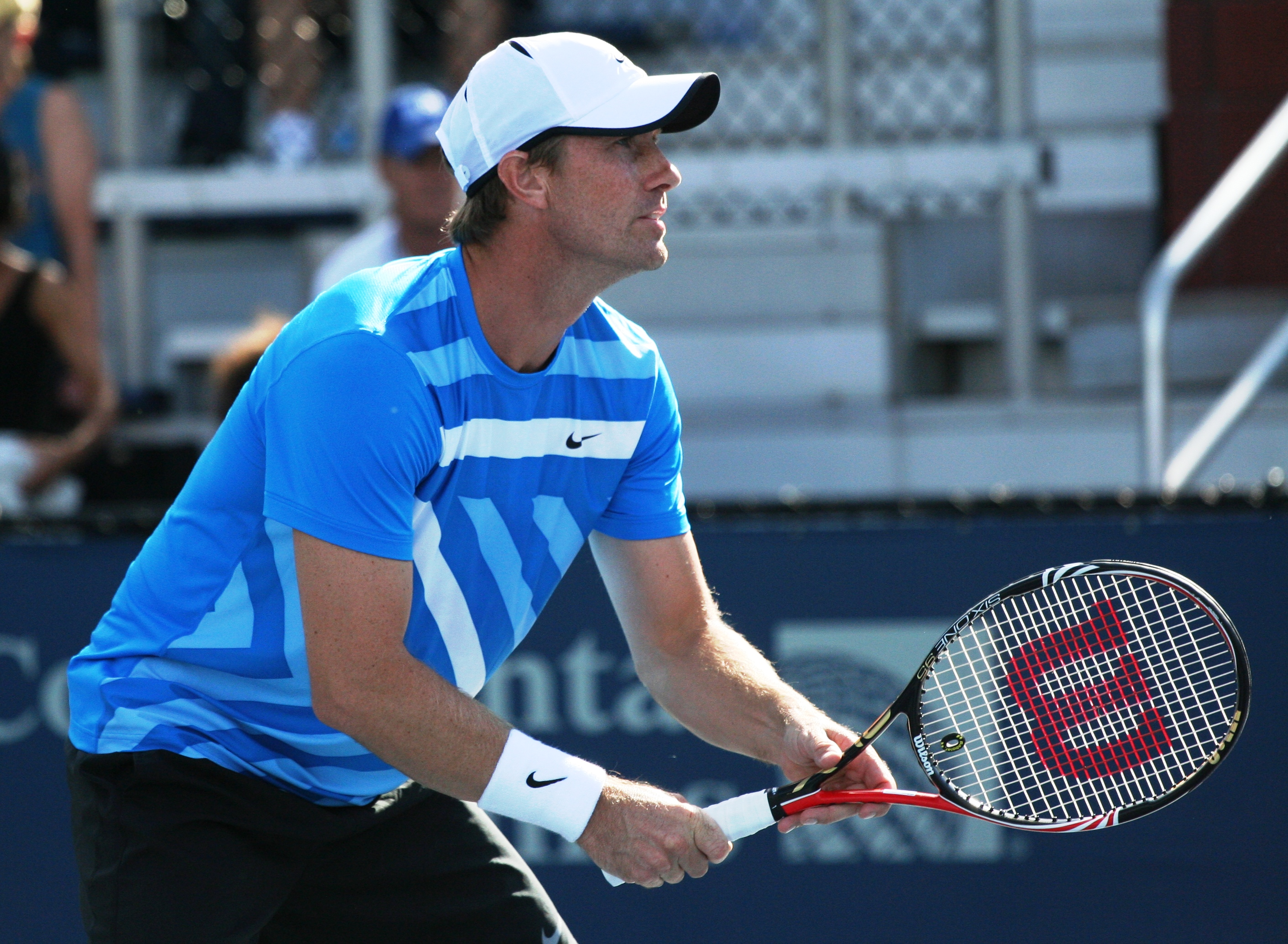
Simon Aspelin at the 2010 US Open

A memorable part of Aspelin's career was when he and doubles partner Todd Perry were playing in the 2006 Wimbledon Championships men's doubles quarterfinals as the eighth-seeded doubles team against third-seeded Mark Knowles and Daniel Nestor. Knowles and Nestor won the match by winning the final set 23–21.

At the 2007 U.S. Open, seeded tenth with his partner Julian Knowle, Aspelin achieved the greatest triumph of his career by winning the U.S. Open, his first Grand Slam. In the first two rounds, they won against Kubot/Skoch and got a walkover over Calleri/Horna. They went on to upset the eighth seeds Jonathan Erlich and Andy Ram in the third round. In the quarterfinals, they shocked the top seeds Bob and Mike Bryan, having lost to them only weeks before. In the semifinal, they held off unseeded Julien Benneteau and Nicolas Mahut, before winning the final in two sets over the ninth seeds, Pavel Vízner and Lukáš Dlouhý. He had never before reached a Grand Slam semifinal. This win put them into the No. 5 position in the ATP Doubles Race, and also gave Aspelin his career-high ranking of No. 13. His Davis cup record in March 2009 is 3–5 in doubles.

Another notable performance in 2007 was the final against Knowles/Nestor in Tennis Masters Cup in Shanghai, which he lost with Julian Knowle.

In the 2008 Summer Olympics, he and fellow Swede Thomas Johansson defeated French pair Michaël Llodra and Arnaud Clément 7–6, 4–6, 19–17 in the semi-finals. The match that lasted 4 hours and 46 minutes. They went on to win the silver medal.

Prior to his pro career, Aspelin competed for four seasons at Pepperdine University, in Malibu, Calif. He was one of just two Waves to earn All-American status all four seasons, and was inducted into the Pepperdine Hall of Fame in the fall of 2010.

In May 2011, he was inducted into the ITA Hall of Fame.

In July 2011, Aspelin announced his retirement from professional tennis. He played his last tournament in Båstad, where he reached the final but failed to claim his thirteenth ATP title.

== Grand Slam finals ==
=== Doubles (1 title) ===
Result	Year	Championship	Surface	Partner	Opponents	Score
Win	2007	U.S. Open	Hard	(Austria) Julian Knowle	(Czech Republic) Lukáš Dlouhý (Czech Republic) Pavel Vízner	7–5, 6–4

== Olympics ==
=== Doubles: 1 (1 Silver) ===
Result	Year	Championship	Surface	Pertner	Opponents	Score
Silver	2008	Beijing Olympics	Hard	(Sweden) Thomas Johansson	(Switzerland) Roger Federer (Switzerland) Stan Wawrinka	3–6, 4–6, 7–6 ^{(7–4)}, 3–6

== Career finals ==
=== Doubles (12 wins, 21 losses) ===
Legend Grand Slam (1) Tennis Masters Cup (0) ATP Masters Series (0) ATP International Series Gold (3) ATP Tour (8)	Titles by surface Hard (5) Clay (5) Grass (1) Carpet (1)

Result	No.	Date	Tournament	Surface	Partner	Opponents	Score
Win	1.	Feb 2000	Marseille	Hard	(Sweden) Johan Landsberg	(Spain) Juan Ignacio Carrasco (Spain) Jairo Velasco, Jr.	7–6^{(7–2)}, 6–4
Loss	1.	Jul 2001	Båstad	Clay	(Australia) Andrew Kratzmann	(Germany) Karsten Braasch (Germany) Jens Knippschild	6–7^{(3–7)}, 6–4, 6–7^{(5–7)}
Loss	2.	Jul 2001	Kitzbühel	Clay	(Australia) Andrew Kratzmann	(Spain) Àlex Corretja (Spain) Luis Lobo	3–6, 6–4, 3–6
Loss	3.	Feb 2002	Buenos Aires	Clay	(Australia) Andrew Kratzmann	(Argentina) Gastón Etlis (Argentina) Martín Rodríguez	6–3, 3–6, [4–10]
Loss	4.	Apr 2002	Estoril	Clay	(Australia) Andrew Kratzmann	(Germany) Karsten Braasch (Russia) Andrei Olhovskiy	3–6, 3–6
Win	2.	May 2003	St. Pölten	Clay	(Italy) Massimo Bertolini	(Armenia) Sargis Sargsian (Serbia) Nenad Zimonjić	6–4, 6–7^{(8–10)}, 6–3
Win	3.	Jul 2003	Båstad	Clay	(Italy) Massimo Bertolini	(Argentina) Lucas Arnold (Argentina) Mariano Hood	6–7^{(3–7)}, 6–0, 6–4
Loss	5.	Sep 2003	Bucharest	Clay	(South Africa) Jeff Coetzee	(Germany) Karsten Braasch (Armenia) Sargis Sargsian	6–7^{(7–9)}, 2–6
Loss	6.	Jul 2004	Båstad	Clay	(Australia) Todd Perry	(India) Mahesh Bhupathi (Sweden) Jonas Björkman	6–4, 6–7^{(2–7)}, 6–7^{(6–8)}
Loss	7.	Jul 2004	Stuttgart	Clay	(Australia) Todd Perry	(Czech Republic) Jiří Novák (Czech Republic) Radek Štěpánek	2–6, 4–6
Loss	8.	Jan 2005	Adelaide	Hard	(Australia) Todd Perry	(Belgium) Xavier Malisse (Belgium) Olivier Rochus	6–7^{(5–7)}, 4–6
Loss	9.	Jan 2005	Auckland	Hard	(Australia) Todd Perry	(Switzerland) Yves Allegro (Germany) Michael Kohlmann	4–6, 6–7^{(4–7)}
Win	4.	Jan 2005	Delray Beach	Hard	(Australia) Todd Perry	(Australia) Jordan Kerr (United States) Jim Thomas	6–3, 6–3
Win	5.	Feb 2005	Memphis	Hard (i)	(Australia) Todd Perry	(United States) Bob Bryan (United States) Mike Bryan	6–4, 6–4
Loss	10.	Jun 2005	Nottingham	Grass	(Australia) Todd Perry	(Israel) Jonathan Erlich (Israel) Andy Ram	6–4, 3–6, 5–7
Loss	11.	Jul 2005	Indianapolis	Hard	(Australia) Todd Perry	(Australia) Paul Hanley (United States) Graydon Oliver	2–6, 1–3 ret.
Loss	12.	Oct 2005	Tokyo	Hard	(Australia) Todd Perry	(Japan) Satoshi Iwabuchi (Japan) Takao Suzuki	4–5^{(3–7)}, 4–5^{(13–15)}
Loss	13.	Jan 2006	Auckland	Hard	(Australia) Todd Perry	(Romania) Andrei Pavel (Netherlands) Rogier Wassen	2–6, 7–5, [4–10]
Win	6.	Oct 2006	St. Petersburg	Carpet	(Australia) Todd Perry	(Austria) Julian Knowle (Austria) Jürgen Melzer	6–1, 7–6^{(7–3)}
Loss	14.	Jan 2007	Auckland	Hard	(South Africa) Chris Haggard	(South Africa) Jeff Coetzee (Netherlands) Rogier Wassen	7–6^{(11–9)}, 3–6, [2–10]
Win	7.	May 2007	Pörtschach	Clay	(Austria) Julian Knowle	(Czech Republic) Leoš Friedl (Czech Republic) David Škoch	7–6^{(8–6)}, 5–7, [10–5]
Win	8.	Jun 2007	Halle	Grass	(Austria) Julian Knowle	(France) Fabrice Santoro (Serbia) Nenad Zimonjić	6–4, 7–6^{(7–5)}
Win	9.	Jul 2007	Båstad	Clay	(Austria) Julian Knowle	(Argentina) Martin García (Argentina) Sebastián Prieto	6–2, 6–4
Win	10.	Sep 2007	U.S. Open	Hard	(Austria) Julian Knowle	(Czech Republic) Lukáš Dlouhý (Czech Republic) Pavel Vízner	7–5, 6–4
Loss	15.	Nov 2007	Tennis Masters Cup, Shanghai	Hard (i)	(Austria) Julian Knowle	(The Bahamas) Mark Knowles (Canada) Daniel Nestor	2–6, 3–6
Loss	16.	Aug 2008	Summer Olympics, Beijing	Hard	(Sweden) Thomas Johansson	(Switzerland) Roger Federer (Switzerland) Stanislas Wawrinka	4–6, 3–6, 7–6^{(7–4)}, 3–6
Loss	17.	Apr 2009	Casablanca	Clay	(Australia) Paul Hanley	(Poland) Łukasz Kubot (Austria) Oliver Marach	6–7^{(4–7)}, 6–3, [6–10]
Loss	18.	May 2009	Madrid	Clay	(South Africa) Wesley Moodie	(Canada) Daniel Nestor (Serbia) Nenad Zimonjić	4–6, 4–6
Win	11.	Jul 2009	Hamburg	Clay	(Australia) Paul Hanley	(Brazil) Marcelo Melo (Slovakia) Filip Polášek	6–3, 6–3
Loss	19.	Oct 2009	Stockholm	Hard (i)	(Australia) Paul Hanley	(Brazil) Bruno Soares (Zimbabwe) Kevin Ullyett	4–6, 6–7^{(4–7)}
Loss	20.	Feb 2010	Rotterdam	Hard (i)	(Australia) Paul Hanley	(Canada) Daniel Nestor (Serbia) Nenad Zimonjić	4–6, 6–4, [7–10]
Win	12.	Feb 2010	Dubai	Hard	(Australia) Paul Hanley	(Czech Republic) Lukáš Dlouhý (India) Leander Paes	6–2, 6–3
Loss	21.	Jul 2011	Båstad	Clay	(Sweden) Andreas Siljeström	(Sweden) Robert Lindstedt (Romania) Horia Tecău	3–6, 3–6

=== Doubles Performance timeline ===
Key
W	F	SF	QF	#R	RR	Q#	P#	DNQ	A	Z#	PO	G	S	B	NMS	NTI	P	NH

(W) winner; (F) finalist; (SF) semifinalist; (QF) quarterfinalist; (#R) rounds 4, 3, 2, 1; (RR) round-robin stage; (Q#) qualification round; (P#) preliminary round; (DNQ) did not qualify; (A) absent; (Z#) Davis/Fed Cup Zonal Group (with number indication) or (PO) play-off; (G) gold, (S) silver or (B) bronze Olympic/Paralympic medal; (NMS) not a Masters tournament; (NTI) not a Tier I tournament; (P) postponed; (NH) not held; (SR) strike rate (events won / competed); (W–L) win–loss record.

Tournament	1997	1998	1999	2000	2001	2002	2003	2004	2005	2006	2007	2008	2009	2010	2011	SR	W–L	Win %
Grand Slam tournaments
Australian Open	A	A	A	3R	1R	2R	2R	2R	3R	QF	2R	1R	1R	3R	1R	0 / 12	13–12	52.00
French Open	A	A	A	1R	2R	1R	1R	1R	3R	2R	3R	3R	3R	1R	3R	0 / 12	11–12	47.83
Wimbledon	A	A	A	1R	2R	1R	2R	QF	1R	QF	1R	1R	QF	2R	3R	0 / 12	14–12	53.85
US Open	A	A	A	1R	1R	2R	1R	3R	QF	2R	W	2R	1R	QF	A	1 / 11	16–10	61.54
Win–loss	0–0	0–0	0–0	2–4	2–4	2–4	2–4	6–4	7–4	8–4	8–3	3–4	5–4	6–4	3–3	1 / 47	54–46	54.00
ATP World Tour Finals
Tour Doubles Finals	A	A	A	SF	A	NH	A	A	A	A	F	A	A	A	A	0 / 2	6–3	66.67
Davis Cup
Davis Cup Doubles	A	A	A	A	SF	A	A	A	PO	PO	SF	QF	PO	PO	QF	0 / 8	6–6	50.00
Olympic Games
Summer Olympics	Not Held			A	Not Held			A	Not Held			F	Not Held			0 / 1	4–1	80.00
ATP World Tour Masters 1000
Indian Wells	A	A	A	A	A	1R	A	1R	1R	SF	1R	1R	1R	SF	1R	0 / 9	6–9	40.00
Miami	A	A	A	2R	2R	2R	A	1R	1R	1R	2R	QF	1R	2R	1R	0 / 11	6–11	35.29
Monte Carlo	A	A	A	A	1R	1R	A	A	2R	QF	SF	QF	2R	SF	A	0 / 8	7–8	46.67
Hamburg	A	A	A	1R	QF	1R	A	A	1R	QF	SF	QF	Madrid (C)			0 / 7	5–7	41.67
Madrid (Clay)	Held as Hamburg												F	2R	A	0 / 2	4–2	66.67
Rome	A	A	A	QF	2R	2R	A	A	2R	QF	2R	2R	1R	2R	A	0 / 9	6–9	40.00
Canada	A	A	A	A	A	A	A	A	1R	QF	2R	2R	1R	2R	A	0 / 6	3–6	33.33
Cincinnati	A	A	A	A	A	A	A	A	2R	QF	QF	QF	A	1R	A	0 / 5	5–5	50.00
Stuttgart	A	A	A	A	A	Held as Madrid (Hard)							Shanghai			0 / 0	0–0	–
Madrid (Hard)	Held as Stuttgart					A	A	A	1R	1R	QF	QF	Shanghai			0 / 4	2–4	33.33
Shanghai	Held as Stuttgart					Held as Madrid (Hard)							2R	2R	A	0 / 2	2–2	50.00
Paris	A	A	A	A	A	A	A	A	1R	1R	SF	QF	QF	1R	A	0 / 6	5–6	45.45
Career statistics
Tournaments played	0	0	3	22	26	31	22	23	30	25	31	27	30	24	15	309		
Titles	0	0	0	1	0	0	2	0	2	1	4	0	1	1	0	12		
Finals reached	0	0	0	1	2	2	3	2	7	2	6	1	4	2	1	33		
Hard Win–loss	0–0	0–0	0–2	11–9	9–10	12–14	3–8	9–11	30–15	23–15	22–19	24–20	10–18	22–14	5–6	5 / 164	180–161	52.79
Grass Win–loss	0–0	0–0	0–0	0–1	3–3	1–2	1–1	3–2	5–4	3–2	4–1	0–2	5–2	3–3	2–3	1 / 26	30–26	53.57
Clay Win–loss	0–0	0–0	1–1	13–10	15–12	9–14	13–8	7–8	8–8	5–7	17–8	7–6	19–9	3–6	9–7	5 / 107	126–104	54.78
Carpet Win–loss	0–0	0–0	0–0	1–1	1–1	0–1	2–2	1–2	1–2	4–1	1–2	0–0	1–0	0–0	0–0	1 / 12	12–12	50.00
Overall win–loss	0–0	0–0	1–3	25–21	28–26	22–31	19–19	20–23	44–29	35–25	44–30	31–28	35–29	28–23	16–16	12 / 309	348–303	53.46
Win %	–	–	25%	54%	52%	42%	50%	47%	60%	58%	59%	53%	55%	55%	50%	53.46%		
Year-end ranking	355	322	111	51	50	55	40	45	17	19	8	22	23	26	74	$2,121,037		
