= ATP Auckland Open =

Coordinates: 36.854°S 174.773°E

ASB Classic

ATP Tour
- Founded: 1886
- Location: Auckland; New Zealand
- Venue: ASB Tennis Centre
- Category: ATP World Series (1990-1997); ATP International Series (1998–2008); ATP World Tour 250 (2009–2018); ATP 250 (2019–)
- Surface: Grass (1956–1977); Hard (Note: Currently played on Plexicushion.) (1978–current)
- Draw: 28S/32Q/16D
- Prize money: $766,290 (2025)
- Website: ASB Classic

Current champions (2026)
- Men's singles: (Czech Republic) Jakub Menšík
- Men's doubles: (France) Théo Arribagé (France) Albano Olivetti

The ATP Auckland Open, currently known as the ASB Classic (sponsored by ASB Bank), is a professional men's tennis tournament in Auckland, New Zealand. The tournament is played at the ASB Tennis Centre, in Parnell. It is part of the ATP World Tour 250 series of the Association of Tennis Professionals (ATP) World Tour. The tournament is held annually in January a week before the first Grand Slam tournament of the season, the Australian Open.

The Auckland Open returned in 2023 after the 2021 and 2022 events were cancelled due to the COVID-19 pandemic causing travel restrictions for international visitors to New Zealand.

== History ==
In the 1920s major new tennis venues were built in Auckland for the Auckland Lawn Tennis Association (now Tennis Auckland), Wellington and Christchurch in the 1920s comprising both grass and hard courts. In 1920 when the Auckland Lawn Tennis Association (now Tennis Auckland) was looking for a permanent base, the only available site was a tip in Stanley Street. The local clubs raised the-then significant sum of 1,800 pounds to prepare the site and build new courts. For the next 30 years the Tennis Centre in Stanley Street was home to local tennis matches. In 1956 Auckland hosted its first permanent international tournament, the 'Auckland Invitation'. The tournament was a joint men's and women's event until 1981.

From 1969, the first edition in the open era of tennis, until 1995 the tournament was known under its sponsored name 'Benson and Hedges Open'. From 1998 until 2015 it was named the 'Heineken Open'.

By the 1960s the shuttle bus fare from town to Stanley Street was sixpence. Admission was five shillings for the first three days and 7/6 for finals and semifinals – a whole tournament for the equivalent of $4. By the 1970s, 25 cents got you all-day parking next door at Carlaw Park. The tournament was played on outdoor grass courts from its inaugural edition in 1956 until 1977, switching to hard courts in 1978. Between 1979 and 1989 it was a tournament of the Grand Prix tennis circuit.

After being separated for 34 years, the WTA and ATP merged the event in 2016 and both tournaments are now known collectively as the ASB Classic. Heineken will still be a sponsor but will have a diminished role in anticipation of new tennis regulations restricting alcohol sponsorship.

Both the 2021 and 2022 Auckland Open were cancelled due to the COVID-19 pandemic. In regards to the 2022 cancellation, organizers cited New Zealand's strict quarantine rules as making it intractable for players, officials, and all other required staff to be admitted into the country.

== Past finals ==
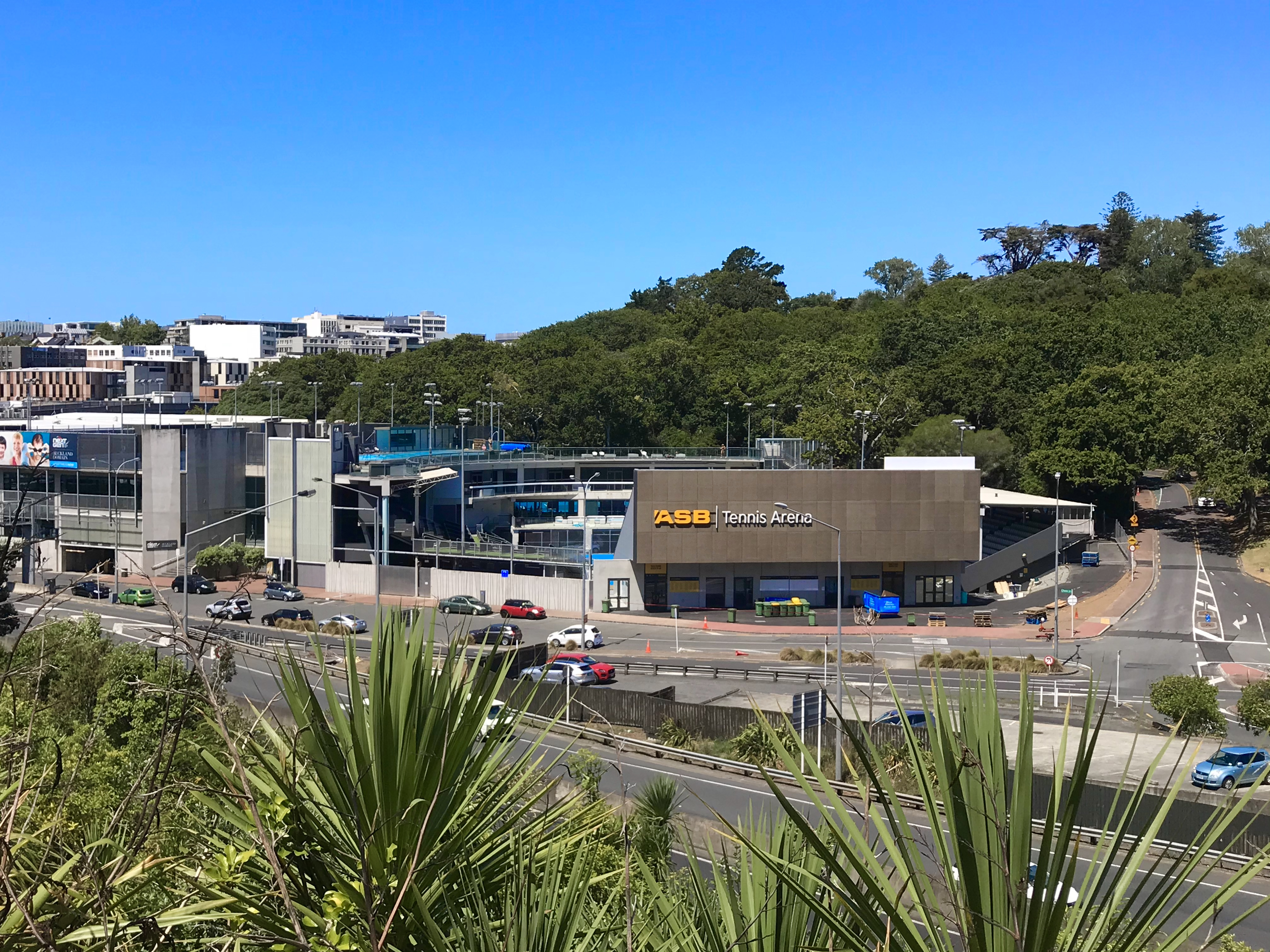
The ASB Tennis Centre

=== Men's singles ===
Year	Champions	Runners-up	Score
1956	(United States) Robert Perry	(New Zealand) Allan Burns	6–4, 6–3, 6–3
1957	Final not played due to rain		
1958	(South Africa) Trevor Fancutt	(Australia) Bob Mark	2–6, 6–4, 6–2, 4–6, 6–3
1959	(New Zealand) Jeff Robson	(Australia) Roy Emerson	6–2, 6–4, 8–6
1960	(Australia) Roy Emerson	(New Zealand) Ronald McKenzie	6–3, 6–1, 6–1
1961	(Australia) Rod Laver	(Australia) Roy Emerson	4–6, 6–3, 6–2, 3–6, 7–5
1962	(Australia) Ken Fletcher	(New Zealand) Lew Gerrard	6–3, 8–10, 7–5, 6–2
1963	(Australia) Fred Stolle	(South Africa) Bob Hewitt	2–6, 6–3, 6–1, 6–2
1964	(Australia) Fred Stolle (2)	(New Zealand) Lew Gerrard	6–3, 6–1, 6–1
1965	(Australia) Roy Emerson (2)	(France) Pierre Barthès	3–6, 8–6, 7–5, 6–3
1966	(Australia) Roy Emerson (3)	(United Kingdom) Roger Taylor	6–4, 6–3, 6–1
1967	(Australia) Roy Emerson (4)	(Australia) Owen Davidson	6–4, 6–2, 7–5
1968	(Australia) Barry Phillips-Moore	(New Zealand) Onny Parun	6–3, 6–8, 1–6, 6–3, 6–2
↓ Open Era ↓
1969	(Australia) Tony Roche	(Australia) Rod Laver	6–1, 6–4, 4–6, 6–3
1970	(United Kingdom) Roger Taylor	(Netherlands) Tom Okker	6–4, 6–4, 6–1
1971	(Australia) Robert Carmichael	(Australia) Allan Stone	7–6, 7–6, 6–3
1972	(Australia) Ray Ruffels	(Australia) John Alexander	6–4, 6–4, 7–6
1973	(New Zealand) Onny Parun	(France) Patrick Proisy	4–6, 6–7, 6–2, 6–0, 7–6
1974	(Sweden) Björn Borg	(New Zealand) Onny Parun	6–4, 6–3, 6–1
1975	(New Zealand) Onny Parun (2)	(New Zealand) Brian Fairlie	4–6, 6–4, 6–4, 6–7, 6–4
1976	(New Zealand) Onny Parun (3)	(New Zealand) Brian Fairlie	6–2, 6–3, 4–6, 6–3
1977	(India) Vijay Amritraj	(United States) Tim Wilkison	7–6, 5–7, 6–1, 6–2
↓ ATP Challenger Series event ↓
1978	(United States) Eliot Teltscher	(New Zealand) Onny Parun	6–3, 7–5, 6–1
↓ Grand Prix event ↓
1979	(United States) Tim Wilkison	(Austria) Peter Feigl	6–3, 6–7, 6–4, 2–6, 6–2
1980	(United States) John Sadri	(United States) Tim Wilkison	6–4, 3–6, 6–3, 6–4
1981	(United States) Bill Scanlon	(United States) Tim Wilkison	6–7, 6–3, 3–6, 7–6, 6–0
1982	(United States) Tim Wilkison (2)	(New Zealand) Russell Simpson	6–4, 6–4, 6–4
1983	(Australia) John Alexander	(New Zealand) Russell Simpson	6–4, 6–3, 6–3
1984	(United States) Danny Saltz	(United States) Chip Hooper	4–6, 6–3, 6–4, 6–4
1985	(New Zealand) Chris Lewis	(Australia) Wally Masur	7–5, 6–0, 2–6, 6–4
1986	(Australia) Mark Woodforde	(United States) Bud Schultz	6–4, 6–3, 3–6, 6–4
1987	(Czechoslovakia) Miloslav Mečíř	(Netherlands) Michiel Schapers	6–2, 6–3, 6–4
1988	(Israel) Amos Mansdorf	(India) Ramesh Krishnan	6–3, 6–4
1989	(India) Ramesh Krishnan	(Israel) Amos Mansdorf	6–4, 6–0
↓ ATP World Series event ↓
1990	(United States) Scott Davis	(Soviet Union) Andrei Chesnokov	4–6, 6–3, 6–3
1991	(Czechoslovakia) Karel Nováček	(France) Jean-Philippe Fleurian	7–6^{(7–5)}, 7–6^{(7–4)}
1992	(Peru) Jaime Yzaga	(United States) MaliVai Washington	7–6^{(8–6)}, 6–4
1993	(Russia) Alexander Volkov	(United States) MaliVai Washington	7–6^{(7–2)}, 6–4
1994	(Sweden) Magnus Gustafsson	(United States) Patrick McEnroe	6–4, 6–0
1995	(Sweden) Thomas Enqvist	(United States) Chuck Adams	6–2, 6–1
1996	(Czech Republic) Jiří Novák	(New Zealand) Brett Steven	6–4, 6–4
1997	(Sweden) Jonas Björkman	(Denmark) Kenneth Carlsen	7–6, 6–0
1998	(Chile) Marcelo Ríos	(Australia) Richard Fromberg	4–6, 6–4, 7–6^{(7–3)}
1999	(Netherlands) Sjeng Schalken	(Germany) Tommy Haas	6–4, 6–4
↓ ATP International Series event ↓
2000	(Sweden) Magnus Norman	(United States) Michael Chang	3–6, 6–3, 7–5
2001	(Slovakia) Dominik Hrbatý	(Spain) Francisco Clavet	6–4, 2–6, 6–3
2002	(United Kingdom) Greg Rusedski	(France) Jérôme Golmard	6–7, 6–4, 7–5
2003	(Brazil) Gustavo Kuerten	(Slovakia) Dominik Hrbatý	6–3, 7–5
2004	(Slovakia) Dominik Hrbatý (2)	(Spain) Rafael Nadal	4–6, 6–2, 7–5
2005	(Chile) Fernando González	(Belgium) Olivier Rochus	6–4, 6–2
2006	(Finland) Jarkko Nieminen	(Croatia) Mario Ančić	6–2, 6–2
2007	(Spain) David Ferrer	(Spain) Tommy Robredo	6–4, 6–2
2008	(Germany) Philipp Kohlschreiber	(Spain) Juan Carlos Ferrero	7–6^{(7–4)}, 7–5
↓ ATP 250 event ↓
2009	(Argentina) Juan Martín del Potro	(United States) Sam Querrey	6–4, 6–4
2010	(United States) John Isner	(France) Arnaud Clément	6–3, 5–7, 7–6^{(7–2)}
2011	(Spain) David Ferrer (2)	(Argentina) David Nalbandian	6–3, 6–2
2012	(Spain) David Ferrer (3)	(Belgium) Olivier Rochus	6–3, 6–4
2013	(Spain) David Ferrer (4)	(Germany) Philipp Kohlschreiber	7–6^{(7–5)}, 6–1
2014	(United States) John Isner (2)	(Chinese Taipei) Lu Yen-hsun	7–6^{(7–4)}, 7–6^{(9–7)}
2015	(Czech Republic) Jiří Veselý	(France) Adrian Mannarino	6–3, 6–2
2016	(Spain) Roberto Bautista Agut	(United States) Jack Sock	6–1, 1–0, Ret.
2017	(United States) Jack Sock	(Portugal) João Sousa	6–3, 5–7, 6–3
2018	(Spain) Roberto Bautista Agut (2)	(Argentina) Juan Martín del Potro	6–1, 4–6, 7–5
2019	(United States) Tennys Sandgren	(United Kingdom) Cameron Norrie	6–4, 6–2
2020	(France) Ugo Humbert	(France) Benoît Paire	7–6^{(7–2)}, 3–6, 7–6^{(7–5)}
2021	Cancelled due to the COVID-19 pandemic		
2022	Cancelled due to the COVID-19 pandemic		
2023	(France) Richard Gasquet	(United Kingdom) Cameron Norrie	4–6, 6–4, 6–4
2024	(Chile) Alejandro Tabilo	(Japan) Taro Daniel	6–2, 7–5
2025	(France) Gaël Monfils	(Belgium) Zizou Bergs	6–3, 6–4
2026	(Czech Republic) Jakub Menšík	(Argentina) Sebastián Báez	6–3, 7–6^{(9–7)}

=== Men's doubles ===
Year	Champions	Runners-up	Score
1968	(Australia) Dick Crealy (Australia) Barry Phillips-Moore		
1969	(South Africa) Raymond Moore (United Kingdom) Roger Taylor	(Australia) Mal Anderson (Soviet Union) Toomas Leius	13–15, 6–3, 8–6, 8–6
1970	(Australia) Dick Crealy (2) (Australia) Ray Ruffels		
1971	(Australia) Bob Carmichael (Australia) Ray Ruffels	(New Zealand) Brian Fairlie (South Africa) Raymond Moore	6–3, 6–7, 6–4, 4–6, 6–3
1972	(Australia) Bob Carmichael (2) (Australia) Ray Ruffels (2)		
1973	(New Zealand) Brian Fairlie (Australia) Allan Stone	(Australia) Dick Crealy (Australia) Bob Carmichael	7–6, 4–6, 7–6, 6–2
1974	(Australia) Syd Ball (Australia) Bob Giltinan	(Australia) Ray Ruffels (Australia) Allan Stone	6–1, 6–4
1975	(Australia) Bob Carmichael (3) (Australia) Ray Ruffels (3)	(New Zealand) Brian Fairlie (New Zealand) Onny Parun	7–6, Ret.
1976	Not completed		
1977	(New Zealand) Chris Lewis (New Zealand) Russell Simpson	(Australia) Peter Langsford (United Kingdom) Jonathan Smith	7–6, 6–4
1978	(New Zealand) Chris Lewis (2) (New Zealand) Russell Simpson (2)	(Australia) Rod Frawley (West Germany) Karl Meiler	6–1, 7–6
1979	(South Africa) Bernard Mitton (Australia) Kim Warwick	(United Kingdom) Andrew Jarrett (United Kingdom) Jonathan Smith	6–3, 2–6, 6–3
1980	(Austria) Peter Feigl (Australia) Rod Frawley	(United States) John Sadri (United States) Tim Wilkison	6–2, 7–5
1981	(United States) Ferdi Taygan (United States) Tim Wilkison	(United States) Tony Graham (United States) Bill Scanlon	7–5, 6–1
1982	(United Kingdom) Andrew Jarrett (United Kingdom) Jonathan Smith	(United States) Larry Stefanki (United States) Robert Van't Hof	7–5, 7–6
1983	(New Zealand) Chris Lewis (3) (New Zealand) Russell Simpson (3)	(Australia) David Graham (Australia) Laurie Warder	7–6, 6–3
1984	(South Africa) Brian Levine (United States) John Van Nostrand	(Australia) Brad Drewett (United States) Chip Hooper	7–5, 6–2
1985	(Australia) John Fitzgerald (New Zealand) Chris Lewis (3)	(Australia) Broderick Dyke (Australia) Wally Masur	7–6, 6–2
1986	(Australia) Broderick Dyke (Australia) Wally Masur	(United States) Karl Richter (United States) Rick Rudeen	6–3, 6–4
1987	(United States) Kelly Jones (United States) Brad Pearce	(Australia) Carl Limberger (Australia) Mark Woodforde	7–6, 7–6
1988	(United States) Marty Davis (United States) Tim Pawsat	(United States) Sammy Giammalva Jr. (United States) Jim Grabb	6–3, 3–6, 6–4
1989	(New Zealand) Steve Guy (Japan) Shuzo Matsuoka	(United States) John Letts (United States) Bruce Man-Son-Hing	7–6, 7–6
1990	(United States) Kelly Jones (2) (United States) Robert Van't Hof	(Israel) Gilad Bloom (Netherlands) Paul Haarhuis	7–6, 6–0
1991	(Spain) Sergio Casal (Spain) Emilio Sánchez	(Canada) Grant Connell (Canada) Glenn Michibata	4–6, 6–3, 6–4
1992	(South Africa) Wayne Ferreira (United States) Jim Grabb	(Canada) Grant Connell (Canada) Glenn Michibata	6–4, 6–3
1993	(Canada) Grant Connell (United States) Patrick Galbraith	(Austria) Alex Antonitsch (Russia) Alexander Volkov	6–3, 7–6
1994	(United States) Patrick McEnroe (United States) Jared Palmer	(Canada) Grant Connell (United States) Patrick Galbraith	6–2, 4–6, 6–4
1995	(Canada) Grant Connell (2) (United States) Patrick Galbraith (2)	(Argentina) Luis Lobo (Spain) Javier Sánchez	6–4, 6–3
1996	(South Africa) Marcos Ondruska (United States) Jack Waite	(Sweden) Jonas Björkman (New Zealand) Brett Steven	Walkover
1997	(South Africa) Ellis Ferreira (United States) Patrick Galbraith (3)	(United States) Rick Leach (United States) Jonathan Stark	6–4, 4–6, 7–6
1998	(United States) Patrick Galbraith (4) (New Zealand) Brett Steven	(Netherlands) Tom Nijssen (United States) Jeff Tarango	6–4, 6–2
1999	(United States) Jeff Tarango (Czech Republic) Daniel Vacek	(Czech Republic) Jiří Novák (Czech Republic) David Rikl	7–5, 7–5
2000	(South Africa) Ellis Ferreira (2) (United States) Rick Leach	(France) Olivier Delaître (United States) Jeff Tarango	7–5, 6–4
2001	(South Africa) Marius Barnard (United States) Jim Thomas	(South Africa) David Adams (Argentina) Martín García	7–6, 6–4
2002	(Sweden) Jonas Björkman (Australia) Todd Woodbridge	(Argentina) Martín García (Czech Republic) Cyril Suk	7–6, 7–6
2003	(United States) David Adams (South Africa) Robbie Koenig	(Czech Republic) Tomáš Cibulec (Czech Republic) Leoš Friedl	7–6, 4–6, 6–3
2004	(India) Mahesh Bhupathi (France) Fabrice Santoro	(Czech Republic) Jiří Novák (Czech Republic) Radek Štěpánek	4–6, 7–5, 6–3
2005	(Switzerland) Yves Allegro (Germany) Michael Kohlmann	(Sweden) Simon Aspelin (Australia) Todd Perry	6–4, 7–6
2006	(Romania) Andrei Pavel (Netherlands) Rogier Wassen	(Sweden) Simon Aspelin (Australia) Todd Perry	6–3, 5–7, [10–4]
2007	(South Africa) Jeff Coetzee (Netherlands) Rogier Wassen (2)	(Sweden) Simon Aspelin (South Africa) Chris Haggard	6–7, 6–3, [10–2]
2008	(Peru) Luis Horna (Argentina) Juan Mónaco	(Belgium) Xavier Malisse (Austria) Jürgen Melzer	6–4, 3–6, [10–7]
2009	(Czech Republic) Martin Damm (Sweden) Robert Lindstedt	(United States) Scott Lipsky (India) Leander Paes	7–5, 6–4
2010	(New Zealand) Marcus Daniell (Romania) Horia Tecău	(Brazil) Marcelo Melo (Brazil) Bruno Soares	7–5, 6–4
2011	(Spain) Marcel Granollers (Spain) Tommy Robredo	(Sweden) Johan Brunström (Australia) Stephen Huss	6–4, 7–6^{(8–6)}
2012	(Austria) Oliver Marach (Austria) Alexander Peya	(Czech Republic) František Čermák (Slovakia) Filip Polášek	6–3, 6–2
2013	(United Kingdom) Colin Fleming (Brazil) Bruno Soares	(Sweden) Johan Brunström (Denmark) Frederik Nielsen	7–6^{(7–1)}, 7–6^{(7–2)}
2014	(Austria) Julian Knowle (Brazil) Marcelo Melo	(Austria) Alexander Peya (Brazil) Bruno Soares	4–6, 6–3, [10–5]
2015	(South Africa) Raven Klaasen (India) Leander Paes	(United Kingdom) Dominic Inglot (Romania) Florin Mergea	7–6^{(7–1)}, 6–4
2016	(Croatia) Mate Pavić (New Zealand) Michael Venus	(United States) Eric Butorac (United States) Scott Lipsky	7–5, 6–4
2017	(Poland) Marcin Matkowski (Pakistan) Aisam-ul-Haq Qureshi	(Israel) Jonathan Erlich (United States) Scott Lipsky	1–6, 6–2, [10–3]
2018	(Austria) Oliver Marach (2) (Croatia) Mate Pavić (2)	(Belarus) Max Mirnyi (Austria) Philipp Oswald	6–4, 5–7, [10–7]
2019	(Japan) Ben McLachlan (Germany) Jan-Lennard Struff	(South Africa) Raven Klaasen (New Zealand) Michael Venus	6–3, 6–4
2020	(United Kingdom) Luke Bambridge (Japan) Ben McLachlan (2)	(New Zealand) Marcus Daniell (Austria) Philipp Oswald	7–6^{(7–3)}, 6–3
2021	Cancelled due to the COVID-19 pandemic		
2022	Cancelled due to the COVID-19 pandemic		
2023	(Croatia) Nikola Mektić (Croatia) Mate Pavić (3)	(United States) Nathaniel Lammons (United States) Jackson Withrow	6–4, 6–7^{(5–7)}, [10–6]
2024	(Croatia) Nikola Mektić (2) (Netherlands) Wesley Koolhof	(Spain) Marcel Granollers (Argentina) Horacio Zeballos	6–3, 6–7^{(5–7)}, [10–7]
2025	(Croatia) Nikola Mektić (3) (New Zealand) Michael Venus (2)	(United States) Christian Harrison (United States) Rajeev Ram	Walkover
2026	(France) Théo Arribagé (France) Albano Olivetti	(Austria) Alexander Erler (United States) Robert Galloway	7–6^{(7–2)}, 6–4

== See also ==
- List of tennis tournaments
- WTA Auckland Open – women's tournament
- BP National Championships – men's tournament
