= 2014 Heineken Open – Doubles =

Doubles
- 2014 Heineken Open

Final
- Champions: (Austria) Julian Knowle (Brazil) Marcelo Melo
- Runners-up: (Austria) Alexander Peya (Brazil) Bruno Soares
- Score: 4–6, 6–3, [10–5]

Details
- Draw: 16
- Seeds: 4

Events
Singles	Doubles
← 2013 ·	ATP Auckland Open	· 2015 →

Colin Fleming and Bruno Soares were the defending champions but chose not to compete together. Fleming paired with Ross Hutchins, but lost in the first round to Andre Begemann and Martin Emmrich. Soares paired with Alexander Peya, but lost in the final to Julian Knowle and Marcelo Melo, 6–4, 3–6, [5–10].

== Seeds ==
1. (Austria) Alexander Peya / (Brazil) Bruno Soares (final)
2. (Austria) Julian Knowle / (Brazil) Marcelo Melo (champions)
3. (United Kingdom) Jamie Murray / (Australia) John Peers (quarterfinals, withdrew)
4. (Mexico) Santiago González / (United States) Scott Lipsky (quarterfinals)

== Draw ==
=== Key ===
- Q = Qualifier
- WC = Wild card
- LL = Lucky loser
- Alt = Alternate
- SE = Special exempt
- PR = Protected ranking
- ITF = ITF entry
- JE = Junior exempt
- w/o = Walkover
- r = Retired
- d = Defaulted
- SR = Special ranking

=== Draw ===
First round
1	(Austria) A Peya (Brazil) B Soares	7	6
(Colombia) JS Cabal (Colombia) R Farah	5	1
(Denmark) F Nielsen (Netherlands) I Sijsling	6	6
Alt	(Spain) R Bautista-Agut (Spain) D Gimeno-Traver	4	4
4	(Mexico) S González (United States) S Lipsky	7^{7}	6
(Sweden) J Brunström (Austria) O Marach	6^{2}	3
(Italy) D Bracciali (Czech Republic) L Dlouhý	7	6
(Poland) T Bednarek (United States) N Monroe	5	3
(United States) E Butorac (South Africa) R Klaasen	6	7^{9}
(Australia) P Hanley (United Kingdom) J Marray	2	6^{7}
WC	(New Zealand) J Statham (New Zealand) M Venus	4	4
3	(United Kingdom) J Murray (Australia) J Peers	6	6
WC	(United Kingdom) C Fleming (United Kingdom) R Hutchins	6^{5}	3
(Germany) A Begemann (Germany) M Emmrich	7^{7}	6
(Germany) T Haas (Brazil) A Sá	1	4
2	(Austria) J Knowle (Brazil) M Melo	6	6

Quarterfinals
1	(Austria) A Peya (Brazil) B Soares	7	7
(Denmark) F Nielsen (Netherlands) I Sijsling	5	5
4	(Mexico) S González (United States) S Lipsky	6	3	[5]
(Italy) D Bracciali (Czech Republic) L Dlouhý	3	6	[10]
(United States) E Butorac (South Africa) R Klaasen	w/o
3	(United Kingdom) J Murray (Australia) J Peers
(Germany) A Begemann (Germany) M Emmrich	6	1	[9]
2	(Austria) J Knowle (Brazil) M Melo	4	6	[11]

Semifinals
1	(Austria) A Peya (Brazil) B Soares	6	6
(Italy) D Bracciali (Czech Republic) L Dlouhý	4	0
(United States) E Butorac (South Africa) R Klaasen	6^{3}	6^{4}
2	(Austria) J Knowle (Brazil) M Melo	7^{7}	7^{7}

Final
1	(Austria) A Peya (Brazil) B Soares	6	3	[5]
2	(Austria) J Knowle (Brazil) M Melo	4	6	[10]
