= 2015 Heineken Open – Doubles =

Doubles
- 2015 Heineken Open

Final
- Champions: (South Africa) Raven Klaasen (India) Leander Paes
- Runners-up: (United Kingdom) Dominic Inglot (Romania) Florin Mergea
- Score: 7–6^{(7–1)}, 6–4

Details
- Draw: 16
- Seeds: 4

Events
Singles	Doubles
← 2014 ·	ATP Auckland Open	· 2016 →

Julian Knowle and Marcelo Melo were the defending champions, but Knowle chose not to participate. Melo played alongside Max Mirnyi, but lost in the semifinals to Dominic Inglot and Florin Mergea.
Raven Klaasen and Leander Paes won the title, defeating Inglot and Mergea in the final, 7–6^{(7–1)}, 6–4.

== Seeds ==
1. (United States) Bob Bryan / (United States) Mike Bryan (first round)
2. (Austria) Alexander Peya / (Brazil) Bruno Soares (semifinals)
3. (Colombia) Juan Sebastián Cabal / (Colombia) Robert Farah (first round)
4. (South Africa) Raven Klaasen / (India) Leander Paes (champions)

== Draw ==
=== Key ===
- Q = Qualifier
- WC = Wild card
- LL = Lucky loser
- Alt = Alternate
- SE = Special exempt
- PR = Protected ranking
- ITF = ITF entry
- JE = Junior exempt
- w/o = Walkover
- r = Retired
- d = Defaulted
- SR = Special ranking

=== Draw ===
First round
1	(United States) B Bryan (United States) M Bryan	6	6^{4}	[9]
(Germany) A Begemann (Netherlands) R Haase	1	7^{7}	[11]
WC	(New Zealand) F Tearney (New Zealand) W Whitehouse	7^{7}	5	[7]
(Brazil) M Melo (Belarus) M Mirnyi	6^{2}	7	[10]
3	(Colombia) JS Cabal (Colombia) R Farah	4	6	[8]
WC	(New Zealand) A Sitak (New Zealand) M Venus	6	3	[10]
(Colombia) S Giraldo (Portugal) J Sousa	3	6^{10}
(United Kingdom) D Inglot (Romania) F Mergea	6	7^{12}
(Chinese Taipei) Y-h Lu (Austria) O Marach	7^{7}	6
(Germany) J-L Struff (Austria) D Thiem	6^{3}	3
(United Kingdom) J Murray (Australia) J Peers	6^{3}	6	[6]
4	(South Africa) R Klaasen (India) L Paes	7^{7}	4	[10]
(Spain) P Carreño Busta (Spain) G García-López	6	6
(Poland) M Fyrstenberg (Mexico) S González	4	4
(Sweden) J Brunström (United States) S Lipsky	4	3
2	(Austria) A Peya (Brazil) B Soares	6	6

Quarterfinals
(Germany) A Begemann (Netherlands) R Haase	6^{9}	5
(Brazil) M Melo (Belarus) M Mirnyi	7^{11}	7
WC	(New Zealand) A Sitak (New Zealand) M Venus	2	3
(United Kingdom) D Inglot (Romania) F Mergea	6	6
(Chinese Taipei) Y-h Lu (Austria) O Marach	6	3	[6]
4	(South Africa) R Klaasen (India) L Paes	4	6	[10]
(Spain) P Carreño Busta (Spain) G García-López	3	4
2	(Austria) A Peya (Brazil) B Soares	6	6

Semifinals
(Brazil) M Melo (Belarus) M Mirnyi	4	6	[12]
(United Kingdom) D Inglot (Romania) F Mergea	6	3	[14]
4	(South Africa) R Klaasen (India) L Paes	3	6	[10]
2	(Austria) A Peya (Brazil) B Soares	6	3	[4]

Final
(United Kingdom) D Inglot (Romania) F Mergea	6^{1}	4
4	(South Africa) R Klaasen (India) L Paes	7^{7}	6
