= 2010 Aegon Pro-Series Loughborough – Men's singles =

Men's singles
- 2010 Aegon Pro-Series Loughborough

Final
- Champion: (Germany) Matthias Bachinger
- Runner-up: (Denmark) Frederik Nielsen
- Score: 6–3, 3–6, 6–1

Events
Singles	men	women
Doubles	men	women
← 2009 ·	Aegon Pro-Series Loughborough	· 2011 →

Matthias Bachinger won the inaugural event by defeating Frederik Nielsen 6–3, 3–6, 6–1 in the final.

== Seeds ==
1. (Germany) Björn Phau (quarterfinals)
2. (France) Adrian Mannarino (first round)
3. (Austria) Andreas Haider-Maurer (quarterfinals)
4. (France) David Guez (first round)
5. (Republic of Ireland) Conor Niland (semifinals)
6. (Australia) Matthew Ebden (quarterfinals)
7. (Italy) Simone Vagnozzi (second round)
8. (Switzerland) Michael Lammer (second round)

== Draw ==
=== Key ===
- Q = Qualifier
- WC = Wild card
- LL = Lucky loser
- Alt = Alternate
- SE = Special exempt
- PR = Protected ranking
- ITF = ITF entry
- JE = Junior exempt
- w/o = Walkover
- r = Retired
- d = Defaulted
- SR = Special ranking

=== Finals ===
Semifinals
5	(Republic of Ireland) Conor Niland	4	3
(Denmark) Frederik Nielsen	6	6
(United Kingdom) James Ward	4	1
(Germany) Matthias Bachinger	6	6

Final
(Denmark) Frederik Nielsen	3	6	1
(Germany) Matthias Bachinger	6	3	6

=== Top half ===
First round
1	(Germany) B Phau	6	6
(Czech Republic) D Lojda	4	4
Q	(Austria) M Raditschnigg	6^{7}	6	6
(Slovakia) P Červenák	7	1	4
WC	(United Kingdom) J Milton	7	7
(Australia) R Junaid	5	6^{0}
WC	(United Kingdom) J Baker	7	4	2
5	(Republic of Ireland) C Niland	5	6	6
4	(France) D Guez	2	0
(Netherlands) M Middelkoop	6	6
WC	(United Kingdom) D Cox	2	1
(Denmark) F Nielsen	6	6
(Italy) S Galvani	3	6	6
WC	(United Kingdom) D Evans	6	4	3
Q	(United Kingdom) M Willis	4	4
7	(Italy) S Vagnozzi	6	6

Second round
1	(Germany) B Phau	6	6
Q	(Austria) M Raditschnigg	1	4
WC	(United Kingdom) J Milton	1	6	1
5	(Republic of Ireland) C Niland	6	1	6
(Netherlands) M Middelkoop	w/o
(Denmark) F Nielsen
(Italy) S Galvani	6	7
7	(Italy) S Vagnozzi	1	5

Quarterfinals
1	(Germany) B Phau	3	4
5	(Republic of Ireland) C Niland	6	6
(Denmark) F Nielsen	7	7
(Italy) S Galvani	5	5

Semifinals
5	(Republic of Ireland) C Niland	4	3
(Denmark) F Nielsen	6	6

=== Bottom half ===
First round
8	(Switzerland) M Lammer	6	3	6
(Slovakia) M Semjan	4	6	4
(United Kingdom) J Ward	6	6
(Latvia) A Juška	4	3
Q	(Switzerland) R Valent	6^{3}	6^{4}
(Belgium) Y Mertens	7	7
Q	(United Kingdom) S Thornley	2	1
3	(Austria) A Haider-Maurer	6	6
6	(Australia) M Ebden	3	6	7
(Belgium) D Goffin	6	1	5
(Finland) T Nieminen	3	2
(Finland) H Kontinen	6	6
(Estonia) J Zopp	6	3	6
(Italy) F Cipolla	4	6	4
(Germany) M Bachinger	6	4	6
2	(France) A Mannarino	2	6	2

Second round
8	(Switzerland) M Lammer	6^{1}	3
(United Kingdom) J Ward	7	6
(Belgium) Y Mertens	6^{5}	6	4
3	(Austria) A Haider-Maurer	7	3	6
6	(Australia) M Ebden	6^{5}	7	6
(Finland) H Kontinen	7	5	3
(Estonia) J Zopp	3	6	6^{4}
(Germany) M Bachinger	6	3	7

Quarterfinals
(United Kingdom) J Ward	6	6
3	(Austria) A Haider-Maurer	2	3
6	(Australia) M Ebden	0	1
(Germany) M Bachinger	6	6

Semifinals
(United Kingdom) J Ward	4	1
(Germany) M Bachinger	6	6
