= 2014 Heineken Open – Singles =

Singles
- 2014 Heineken Open

Final
- Champion: (United States) John Isner
- Runner-up: (Chinese Taipei) Lu Yen-hsun
- Score: 7–6^{(7–4)}, 7–6^{(9–7)}

Details
- Draw: 28 (4 Q / 3 WC )
- Seeds: 8

Events
Singles	Doubles
← 2013 ·	ATP Auckland Open	· 2015 →

David Ferrer was the three-time defending champion, but lost in the semifinals to Lu Yen-hsun.

John Isner won the title, defeating Lu in the final, 7–6^{(7–4)}, 7–6^{(9–7)}. It was the 8th career title for Isner, the 2nd in Auckland having previously won in 2010, and only his 2nd outside the United States.

== Seeds ==
The top four seeds receive a bye into the second round.

1. (Spain) David Ferrer (semifinals)
2. (Germany) Tommy Haas (second round)
3. (United States) John Isner (champion)
4. (South Africa) Kevin Anderson (second round)
5. (Germany) Philipp Kohlschreiber (quarterfinals)
6. (France) Benoît Paire (second round)
7. (France) Gaël Monfils (withdrew due to fatigue)
8. (Netherlands) Robin Haase (first round)
9. (Germany) Daniel Brands (first round)

== Draw ==
=== Key ===
- Q = Qualifier
- WC = Wild card
- LL = Lucky loser
- Alt = Alternate
- ITF = ITF entry
- PR = Protected ranking
- SR = Special ranking
- SE = Special exempt
- JE = Junior exempt
- JR = Junior Accelerator Programme entrant
- CO = College Accelerator Programme entrant
- NG = Next Gen Accelerator Program entrant
- w/o = Walkover
- r = Retired
- d = Defaulted

=== Finals ===
Semifinals
1	(Spain) David Ferrer	4	6^{4}
(Chinese Taipei) Lu Yen-hsun	6	7^{7}
3	(United States) John Isner	3	7^{7}	6
(Spain) Roberto Bautista Agut	6	6^{2}	4

Final
(Chinese Taipei) Lu Yen-hsun	6^{4}	6^{7}
3	(United States) John Isner	7^{7}	7^{9}

=== Top half ===
First round
(Argentina) F Delbonis	5	2
Q	(United States) D Young	7	6
(Colombia) S Giraldo	6	7^{7}
(Spain) A Montañés	1	6^{3}
(Spain) G García López	4	7	7^{7}
8	(Netherlands) R Haase	6	5	6^{4}
WC	(Cyprus) M Baghdatis	5	7^{7}	4
LL	(United States) S Johnson	7	6^{3}	6
(Chinese Taipei) Y-h Lu	7	7^{9}
(Netherlands) I Sijsling	5	6^{7}
Q	(United States) B Klahn	7	4	6
9	(Germany) D Brands	5	6	3

Second round
1	(Spain) D Ferrer	6^{5}	6	6
Q	(United States) D Young	7^{7}	3	1
(Colombia) S Giraldo	7^{9}	2	3
(Spain) G García López	6^{7}	6	6
4	(South Africa) K Anderson	5	4
LL	(United States) S Johnson	7	6
(Chinese Taipei) Y-h Lu	6^{3}	6	6
Q	(United States) B Klahn	7^{7}	2	3

Quarterfinals
1	(Spain) D Ferrer	6	5	6
(Spain) G García López	3	7	4
LL	(United States) S Johnson	4	4
(Chinese Taipei) Y-h Lu	6	6

Semifinals
1	(Spain) D Ferrer	4	6^{4}
(Chinese Taipei) Y-h Lu	6	7^{7}

=== Bottom half ===
First round
5	(Germany) P Kohlschreiber	6	3	7
(Spain) P Carreño Busta	2	6	5
(Italy) F Volandri	0	6^{1}
(Argentina) H Zeballos	6	7^{7}
Q	(Slovakia) L Lacko	6	6
WC	(New Zealand) J Statham	3	1
6	(France) B Paire	6	6
(Poland) M Przysiężny	4	2
(Spain) R Bautista Agut	6	3	6
Q	(Spain) D Gimeno Traver	1	6	4
WC	(United States) J Sock	6	6
(France) A Mannarino	3	4

Second round
5	(Germany) P Kohlschreiber	6	6
(Argentina) H Zeballos	4	2
Q	(Slovakia) L Lacko	6^{1}	6	2
3	(United States) J Isner	7^{7}	3	6
6	(France) B Paire	3	4
(Spain) R Bautista Agut	6	6
WC	(United States) J Sock	6	6
2	(Germany) T Haas	4	4

Quarterfinals
5	(Germany) P Kohlschreiber	7^{7}	6^{4}	6^{5}
3	(United States) J Isner	6^{4}	7^{7}	7^{7}
(Spain) R Bautista Agut	6	6
WC	(United States) J Sock	1	3

Semifinals
3	(United States) J Isner	3	7^{7}	6
(Spain) R Bautista Agut	6	6^{2}	4

== Qualifying ==
=== Seeds ===
All seeds receive a bye into the second round.

1. (Spain) Daniel Gimeno Traver (qualified)
2. (Slovakia) Lukáš Lacko (qualified)
3. (United States) Donald Young (qualified)
4. (United States) Bradley Klahn (qualified)
5. (United States) Steve Johnson (qualifying competition, lucky loser)
6. (Japan) Hiroki Kondo (second round)
7. (New Zealand) José Statham (Received wildcard into main draw)
8. (New Zealand) Michael Venus (qualifying competition)

=== Qualifiers ===
1. (Spain) Daniel Gimeno Traver
2. (Slovakia) Lukáš Lacko
3. (United States) Donald Young
4. (United States) Bradley Klahn

=== Lucky loser ===
1. (United States) Steve Johnson

=== Qualifying draw ===
==== First qualifier ====
First round				Second round				Qualifying competition
				1	(Spain) Daniel Gimeno Traver	6	6
(New Zealand) Alexander Klintcharov	2	7^{7}	0		(Czech Republic) Lukáš Dlouhý	0	2
(Czech Republic) Lukáš Dlouhý	6	6^{2}	6					1	(Spain) Daniel Gimeno Traver	6	6
(New Zealand) Ben McLachlan	1	6	4						(New Zealand) Sebastian Lavie	2	2
(New Zealand) Sebastian Lavie	6	2	6		(New Zealand) Sebastian Lavie	w/o
				7	(New Zealand) José Statham

==== Second qualifier ====
First round				Second round				Qualifying competition
				2	(Slovakia) Lukáš Lacko	6	6
	(New Zealand) Finn Tearney	6	0^{r}		(United Kingdom) Cameron Norrie	4	4
	(United Kingdom) Cameron Norrie	2	5					2	(Slovakia) Lukáš Lacko	6	6
WC	(United Kingdom) Rhett Purcell	6	6					8	(New Zealand) Michael Venus	2	2
WC	(United States) Eric Sock	2	4	WC	(United Kingdom) Rhett Purcell	1	1
				8	(New Zealand) Michael Venus	6	6

==== Third qualifier ====
First round				Second round				Qualifying competition
				3	(United States) Donald Young	6	6
	(New Zealand) Daniel Brown	3	2		(Germany) Alexander Zverev	3	2
	(Germany) Alexander Zverev	6	6					3	(United States) Donald Young	6	3	6
WC	(New Zealand) Martin Colenbrander	0	2						(New Zealand) Artem Sitak	1	6	1
	(New Zealand) Artem Sitak	6	6		(New Zealand) Artem Sitak	6	6
				6	(Japan) Hiroki Kondo	3	4

==== Fourth qualifier ====
First round					Second round				Qualifying competition
					4	(United States) Bradley Klahn	6	6
	(New Zealand) Marcus Daniell	7	4	7^{7}		(New Zealand) Marcus Daniell	4	2
	(France) Enzo Couacaud	5	6	6^{5}					4	(United States) Bradley Klahn	7^{7}	7^{7}
WC	(United Kingdom) Ross Hutchins	4	5						5	(United States) Steve Johnson	6^{5}	6^{3}
	(France) Maxime Chazal	6	7			(France) Maxime Chazal	6^{1}	6^{3}
					5	(United States) Steve Johnson	7^{7}	7^{7}
