= 2013 Heineken Open – Singles =

Singles
- 2013 Heineken Open

Final
- Champion: (Spain) David Ferrer
- Runner-up: (Germany) Philipp Kohlschreiber
- Score: 7–6^{(7–5)}, 6–1

Details
- Draw: 28 (4 Q / 3 WC )
- Seeds: 8

Events
Singles	Doubles
← 2012 ·	ATP Auckland Open	· 2014 →

David Ferrer successfully defended his title by defeating Philipp Kohlschreiber in the final, 7–6^{(7–5)}, 6–1.

== Seeds ==
1. (Spain) David Ferrer (champion)
2. (Germany) Philipp Kohlschreiber (final)
3. (Germany) Tommy Haas (quarterfinals)
4. (United States) Sam Querrey (semifinals)
5. (Poland) Jerzy Janowicz (first round)
6. (Austria) Jürgen Melzer (first round)
7. (Slovakia) Martin Kližan (first round)
8. (Brazil) Thomaz Bellucci (second round)

== Draw ==
=== Key ===
- Q = Qualifier
- WC = Wild card
- LL = Lucky loser
- Alt = Alternate
- SE = Special exempt
- PR = Protected ranking
- ITF = ITF entry
- JE = Junior exempt
- w/o = Walkover
- r = Retired
- d = Defaulted
- SR = Special ranking

=== Finals ===
Semifinals
1	(Spain) David Ferrer	6	6
WC	(France) Gaël Monfils	1	2
4	(United States) Sam Querrey	4	6^{2}
2	(Germany) Philipp Kohlschreiber	6	7^{7}

Final
1	(Spain) David Ferrer	7^{7}	6
2	(Germany) Philipp Kohlschreiber	6^{5}	1

=== Top half ===
First round
(Chinese Taipei) Y-h Lu	6	2	6
(France) B Paire	3	6	2
(Slovakia) L Lacko	6	6
(Italy) P Lorenzi	3	3
(Belgium) D Goffin	6^{5}	2
8	(Brazil) T Bellucci	7^{7}	6
(Netherlands) R Haase	6	3	5
Q	(Netherlands) I Sijsling	3	6	7
Q	(Germany) B Becker	7^{7}	3	4
WC	(France) G Monfils	6^{2}	6	6
Q	(Australia) G Jones	7^{9}	6
6	(Austria) J Melzer	6^{7}	2

Second round
1	(Spain) D Ferrer	6	2	6
(Chinese Taipei) Y-h Lu	4	6	3
(Slovakia) L Lacko	6	7
8	(Brazil) T Bellucci	3	5
3	(Germany) T Haas	6	6
Q	(Netherlands) I Sijsling	3	4
WC	(France) G Monfils	6	6
Q	(Australia) G Jones	4	2

Quarterfinals
1	(Spain) D Ferrer	6	6
(Slovakia) L Lacko	2	1
3	(Germany) T Haas	6	5	3
WC	(France) G Monfils	3	7	6

Semifinals
1	(Spain) D Ferrer	6	6
WC	(France) G Monfils	1	2

=== Bottom half ===
First round
5	(Poland) J Janowicz	6	6^{5}	4
(United States) B Baker	4	7^{7}	6
Q	(Canada) J Levine	6	6
WC	(New Zealand) D King-Turner	2	2
WC	(Belgium) O Rochus	6	5	6
(Spain) A Ramos	2	7	2
7	(Slovakia) M Kližan	6^{4}	6	3
(Belgium) X Malisse	7^{7}	3	6
(Japan) G Soeda	1	0
(Colombia) S Giraldo	6	6
(Colombia) A Falla	6	3
(Slovenia) G Žemlja	4	1^{r}

Second round
(United States) B Baker	5	4
Q	(Canada) J Levine	7	6
WC	(Belgium) O Rochus	5	3
4	(United States) S Querrey	7	6
(Belgium) X Malisse	7^{8}	6
(Colombia) S Giraldo	6^{6}	4
(Colombia) A Falla	6^{4}	6	3
2	(Germany) P Kohlschreiber	7^{7}	4	6

Quarterfinals
Q	(Canada) J Levine	4	6^{5}
4	(United States) S Querrey	6	7^{7}
(Belgium) X Malisse	6^{6}	4
2	(Germany) P Kohlschreiber	7^{8}	6

Semifinals
4	(United States) S Querrey	4	6^{2}
2	(Germany) P Kohlschreiber	6	7^{7}

== Qualifying ==
=== Seeds ===
1. (Romania) Victor Hănescu (qualifying competition)
2. (Germany) Benjamin Becker (qualified)
3. (Argentina) Carlos Berlocq (first round, withdrew due to a thigh injury)
4. (Luxembourg) Gilles Müller (first round)
5. (Netherlands) Igor Sijsling (qualified)
6. (Spain) Daniel Gimeno-Traver (second round)
7. (Czech Republic) Lukáš Rosol (qualifying competition)
8. (United States) Michael Russell (second round, withdrew due to illness)

=== Qualifiers ===
1. (Australia) Greg Jones
2. (Germany) Benjamin Becker
3. (Netherlands) Igor Sijsling
4. (Canada) Jesse Levine

=== Draw ===
==== First qualifier ====
First round
1	(Romania) Victor Hănescu	6	6
WC	(New Zealand) Sam Matheson	1	1
(Italy) Flavio Cipolla	6	6
WC	(New Zealand) Martin Colenbrander	1	3
(Germany) Frank Moser	1	7^{7}	3
(Australia) Greg Jones	6	6^{5}	6
(Brazil) Bruno Soares	2	3
8	(United States) Michael Russell	6	6

Second round
1	(Romania) Victor Hănescu	6	2	7
(Italy) Flavio Cipolla	3	6	5
(Australia) Greg Jones	w/o
8	(United States) Michael Russell

Qualifying competition
1	(Romania) Victor Hănescu	6	6^{4}	6^{9}
(Australia) Greg Jones	3	7^{7}	7^{11}

==== Second qualifier ====
First round
2	(Germany) Benjamin Becker	6	6
WC	(New Zealand) Jaden Grinter	4	4
(Italy) Enrico Becuzzi	1	1
(New Zealand) Sebastian Lavie	6	6
(Spain) Sergio Gutiérrez Ferrol	6	7
(New Zealand) Marcus Daniell	2	5
(South Africa) Izak van der Merwe	4	2
7	(Czech Republic) Lukáš Rosol	6	6

Second round
2	(Germany) Benjamin Becker	6	7
(New Zealand) Sebastian Lavie	3	5
(Spain) Sergio Gutiérrez Ferrol	5	6^{4}
7	(Czech Republic) Lukáš Rosol	7	7^{7}

Qualifying competition
2	(Germany) Benjamin Becker	6	6
7	(Czech Republic) Lukáš Rosol	4	4

==== Third qualifier ====
First round
3	(Argentina) Carlos Berlocq
WC	(New Zealand) Cameron Norrie	w/o
(United States) Denis Zivkovic	4	4
(Netherlands) Matwé Middelkoop	6	6
(Slovakia) Michal Mertiňák	6^{4}	7^{7}	6^{4}
(United Kingdom) Colin Fleming	7^{7}	6^{1}	7^{7}
(Spain) Javier Martí	2	7	4
5	(Netherlands) Igor Sijsling	6	5	6

Second round
WC	(New Zealand) Cameron Norrie	3	0
(Netherlands) Matwé Middelkoop	6	6
(United Kingdom) Colin Fleming	0	0
5	(Netherlands) Igor Sijsling	6	6

Qualifying competition
(Netherlands) Matwé Middelkoop	6^{4}	4
5	(Netherlands) Igor Sijsling	7^{7}	6

==== Fourth qualifier ====
First round
4	(Luxembourg) Gilles Müller	4	4
(Canada) Jesse Levine	6	6
(New Zealand) Michael Venus	6	6
WC	(New Zealand) Adam Thompson	1	1
(Denmark) Frederik Nielsen	7	6
(Czech Republic) František Čermák	5	0
(Brazil) André Sá	6	4	1
6	(Spain) Daniel Gimeno-Traver	2	6	6

Second round
(Canada) Jesse Levine	6	6
(New Zealand) Michael Venus	0	3
(Denmark) Frederik Nielsen	5	6	7^{7}
6	(Spain) Daniel Gimeno-Traver	7	2	6^{1}

Qualifying competition
(Canada) Jesse Levine	6	6
(Denmark) Frederik Nielsen	4	1
