= 2015 Heineken Open =

- Date: 12–17 January
- Edition: 39th
- Category: ATP World Tour 250
- Draw: 28S / 16D
- Prize money: $464,490
- Surface: Hard / outdoor
- Location: Auckland, New Zealand
- Venue: ASB Tennis Centre

Champions

Singles
- (Czech Republic) Jiří Veselý

Doubles
- (South Africa) Raven Klaasen / (India) Leander Paes
← 2014 ·	ATP Auckland Open	· 2016 →

The 2015 Heineken Open was a men's tennis tournament played on outdoor hard courts. It was the 39th edition of the Heineken Open, and part of the ATP World Tour 250 series of the 2014 ATP World Tour. It took place at the ASB Tennis Centre in Auckland, New Zealand, from 12 January until 17 January 2015. Unseeded Jiří Veselý, who entered the main draw as a qualifier, won the singles title.

== Finals ==
=== Singles ===
(Czech Republic) Jiří Veselý defeated. (France) Adrian Mannarino, 6–3, 6–2

- It was Veselý's only singles title of the year and the first of his career.

=== Doubles ===
(South Africa) Raven Klaasen / (India) Leander Paes defeated (United Kingdom) Dominic Inglot / (Romania) Florin Mergea, 7–6^{(7–1)}, 6–4

== Points and prize money ==
=== Point distribution ===
Event	W	F	SF	QF	Round of 16	Round of 32	Q	Q3	Q2	Q1
Singles	250	150	90	45	20	0	12	6	0	0
Doubles	250	150	90	45	0	—	—	—	—	—

=== Prize money ===
Event	W	F	SF	QF	Round of 16	Round of 32	Q3	Q2	Q1
Singles	$82,500	$43,450	$23,535	$13,410	$7,900	$4,680	$755	$360	—
Doubles *	$25,060	$13,200	$7,140	$4,090	$2,390	—	—	—	—

_{* per team}

== Singles main-draw entrants ==
=== Seeds ===
Country	Player	Rank^{1}	Seed
~~ESP~~	~~David Ferrer~~	~~10~~	~~1~~
LAT	Ernests Gulbis	13	2
ESP	Roberto Bautista Agut	15	3
RSA	Kevin Anderson	16	4
~~ESP~~	~~Tommy Robredo~~	~~17~~	~~5~~
COL	Santiago Giraldo	32	6
ESP	Guillermo García López	36	7
USA	Steve Johnson	37	8
TPE	Lu Yen-hsun	38	9

- ^{1} Rankings as of January 5, 2015.

=== Other entrants ===
The following players received wildcards into the singles main draw:

- (Croatia) Borna Ćorić
- (New Zealand) Jose Rubin Statham
- (New Zealand) Michael Venus

The following players received entry from the qualifying draw:

- (France) Kenny de Schepper
- (Colombia) Alejandro González
- (Japan) Go Soeda
- (Czech Republic) Jiří Veselý

The following players received entry as lucky losers:

- (Colombia) Alejandro Falla
- (France) Lucas Pouille

=== Withdrawals ===
Before the tournament

- (Spain) David Ferrer → replaced by Alejandro Falla
- (United States) John Isner (preparation for Australian Open) → replaced by Juan Mónaco
- (France) Gaël Monfils (personal reasons) → replaced by Albert Ramos Viñolas
- (Spain) Tommy Robredo (adductor injury) → replaced by Lucas Pouille
- (United States) Jack Sock (hip injury) → replaced by Diego Schwartzman

=== Retirements ===
- (Spain) Roberto Bautista Agut (retired due to illness)

== Doubles main-draw entrants ==
=== Seeds ===
Country	Player	Country	Player	Rank^{1}	Seed
USA	Bob Bryan	USA	Mike Bryan	2	1
AUT	Alexander Peya	BRA	Bruno Soares	20	2
COL	Juan Sebastián Cabal	COL	Robert Farah	45	3
RSA	Raven Klaasen	IND	Leander Paes	47	4

- ^{1} Rankings as of January 5, 2015.

=== Other entrants ===
The following pairs received wildcards into the doubles main draw:

- (New Zealand) Artem Sitak / (New Zealand) Michael Venus
- (New Zealand) Finn Tearney / (New Zealand) Wesley Whitehouse
