= 2013 Heineken Open =

- Date: January 7–13
- Edition: 38th
- Category: ATP World Tour 250
- Draw: 28S / 16D
- Prize money: €491,000
- Surface: Hard
- Location: Auckland, New Zealand

Champions

Singles
- (Spain) David Ferrer

Doubles
- (United Kingdom) Colin Fleming / (Brazil) Bruno Soares
- ATP Auckland Open

The 2013 Heineken Open was a tennis tournament played on outdoor hard courts. It was the 38th edition of the Heineken Open, and was part of the ATP World Tour 250 series of the 2013 ATP World Tour. It took place at the ASB Tennis Centre in Auckland, New Zealand, from January 7 to 12, 2013.

== Finals ==
=== Singles ===
(Spain) David Ferrer defeated (Germany) Philipp Kohlschreiber, 7–6^{(7–5)}, 6–1

- It was Ferrer's 1st singles title of the year and 19th of his career.

=== Doubles ===
(United Kingdom) Colin Fleming / (Brazil) Bruno Soares defeated (Sweden) Johan Brunström / (Denmark) Frederik Nielsen, 7–6^{(7–1)}, 7–6^{(7–2)}

== Singles main-draw entrants ==
=== Seeds ===
Country	Player	Rank	Seed
ESP	David Ferrer	5	1
GER	Philipp Kohlschreiber	20	2
GER	Tommy Haas	21	3
USA	Sam Querrey	22	4
POL	Jerzy Janowicz	26	5
AUT	Jürgen Melzer	29	6
SVK	Martin Kližan	30	7
BRA	Thomaz Bellucci	33	8

- Rankings as of December 31, 2012.

=== Other entrants ===
The following players received wildcards into the singles main draw:

- (New Zealand) Daniel King-Turner
- (France) Gaël Monfils
- (Belgium) Olivier Rochus

The following players received entry into the singles main draw through qualifying:

- (Germany) Benjamin Becker
- (Australia) Greg Jones
- (Canada) Jesse Levine
- (Netherlands) Igor Sijsling

=== Withdrawals ===
Before the tournament

- (United States) Mardy Fish (heart problem)

=== Retirements ===
- (Slovenia) Grega Žemlja (illness)

== Doubles main-draw entrants ==
=== Seeds ===
Country	Player	Country	Player	Rank^{1}	Seed
GBR	Colin Fleming	BRA	Bruno Soares	41	1
MEX	Santiago González	USA	Scott Lipsky	59	2
AUT	Julian Knowle	SVK	Filip Polášek	69	3
ITA	Daniele Bracciali	AUT	Oliver Marach	72	4

- Rankings are as of December 31, 2012.

=== Other entrants ===
The following pairs received wildcards into the doubles main draw:

- (New Zealand) Daniel King-Turner / (New Zealand) Michael Venus
- (New Zealand) Artem Sitak / (New Zealand) José Statham

=== Withdrawals ===
During the tournament

- (Germany) Frank Moser (back injury)

== See also ==
- 2013 ASB Classic – women's tournament
