= 2010 Aegon Pro-Series Loughborough – Men's doubles =

Men's doubles
- 2010 Aegon Pro-Series Loughborough

Final
- Champions: (Finland) Henri Kontinen (Denmark) Frederik Nielsen
- Runners-up: (Australia) Jordan Kerr (United Kingdom) Ken Skupski
- Score: 6–2, 6–4

Events
Singles	men	women
Doubles	men	women
← 2009 ·	Aegon Pro-Series Loughborough	· 2011 →

Henri Kontinen and Frederik Nielsen won the final against Jordan Kerr and Ken Skupski 6–2, 6–4.

== Seeds ==
1. (Australia) Jordan Kerr / (United Kingdom) Ken Skupski (final)
2. (United Kingdom) Ross Hutchins / (United Kingdom) Jamie Murray (first round)
3. (Italy) Flavio Cipolla / (Italy) Simone Vagnozzi (semifinals)
4. (Australia) Rameez Junaid / (Latvia) Andis Juška (quarterfinals)

== Draw ==
=== Key ===
- Q = Qualifier
- WC = Wild card
- LL = Lucky loser
- Alt = Alternate
- SE = Special exempt
- PR = Protected ranking
- ITF = ITF entry
- JE = Junior exempt
- w/o = Walkover
- r = Retired
- d = Defaulted
- SR = Special ranking

=== Draw ===
First round
1	(Australia) J Kerr (United Kingdom) K Skupski	6	6
WC	(United Kingdom) L Burton (United Kingdom) D Evans	3	3
(Netherlands) M Middelkoop (Estonia) J Zopp	6	4	[10]
(France) O Charroin (Austria) M Raditschnigg	4	6	[5]
3	(Italy) F Cipolla (Italy) S Vagnozzi	6	6
(Italy) S Galvani (Belgium) Y Mertens	2	1
(Australia) S Kadir (India) P Raja	6	7
(Republic of Ireland) J Cluskey (Republic of Ireland) C O'Brien	4	5
(Slovakia) P Červenák (Slovakia) M Semjan	6^{4}	3
WC	(United Kingdom) S Thornley (United Kingdom) M Willis	7	6
(Greece) N Karagiannis (Switzerland) M Lammer	3	0
4	(Australia) R Junaid (Latvia) A Juška	6	6
(Finland) H Kontinen (Denmark) F Nielsen	6	6^{5}	[10]
WC	(United Kingdom) G Morgan (United Kingdom) A Slabinsky	3	7	[8]
(Australia) M Ebden (United Kingdom) J Ward	6	7
2	(United Kingdom) R Hutchins (United Kingdom) J Murray	4	6^{3}

Quarterfinals
1	(Australia) J Kerr (United Kingdom) K Skupski
(Netherlands) M Middelkoop (Estonia) J Zopp	w/o
3	(Italy) F Cipolla (Italy) S Vagnozzi	7	7
(Australia) S Kadir (India) P Raja	6^{4}	6^{5}
WC	(United Kingdom) S Thornley (United Kingdom) M Willis	6	1	[10]
4	(Australia) R Junaid (Latvia) A Juška	3	6	[7]
(Finland) H Kontinen (Denmark) F Nielsen	7	6
(Australia) M Ebden (United Kingdom) J Ward	6^{3}	3

Semifinals
1	(Australia) J Kerr (United Kingdom) K Skupski	6	6
3	(Italy) F Cipolla (Italy) S Vagnozzi	3	2
WC	(United Kingdom) S Thornley (United Kingdom) M Willis	4	6	[7]
(Finland) H Kontinen (Denmark) F Nielsen	6	2	[10]

Final
1	(Australia) J Kerr (United Kingdom) K Skupski	2	4
(Finland) H Kontinen (Denmark) F Nielsen	6	6
