= 2014 Heineken Open =

- Date: 6–11 January
- Edition: 38th
- Category: ATP World Tour 250
- Draw: 28S / 16D
- Prize money: €491,000
- Surface: Hard
- Location: Auckland, New Zealand

Champions

Singles
- (United States) John Isner

Doubles
- (Austria) Julian Knowle / (Brazil) Marcelo Melo
← 2013 ·	ATP Auckland Open	· 2015 →

The 2014 Heineken Open was a tennis tournament played on outdoor hard courts. It was the 39th edition of the Heineken Open, and was part of the ATP World Tour 250 series of the 2014 ATP World Tour. It took place at the ASB Tennis Centre in Auckland, New Zealand, from 6 January to 11 January 2014. Third-seeded John Isner won the singles title.

== Finals ==
=== Singles ===
- (United States) John Isner defeated (Chinese Taipei) Lu Yen-hsun, 7–6^{(7–4)}, 7–6^{(9–7)}

=== Doubles ===
- (Austria) Julian Knowle / (Brazil) Marcelo Melo defeated (Austria) Alexander Peya / (Brazil) Bruno Soares, 4–6, 6–3, [10–5]

== Points and prize money ==
=== Point distribution ===
Event	W	F	SF	QF	Round of 16	Round of 32	Q	Q3	Q2	Q1
Singles	250	150	90	45	20	0	12	6	0	0
Doubles	250	150	90	45	0	—	—	—	—	—

=== Prize money ===
Event	W	F	SF	QF	Round of 16	Round of 32	Q3	Q2	Q1
Singles	$82,500	$43,450	$23,535	$13,410	$7,900	$4,680	$755	$360	—
Doubles *	$25,060	$13,200	$7,140	$4,090	$2,390	—	—	—	—

_{* per team}

== Singles main-draw entrants ==
=== Seeds ===
Country	Player	Rank^{1}	Seed
ESP	David Ferrer	3	1
GER	Tommy Haas	12	2
USA	John Isner	14	3
RSA	Kevin Anderson	20	4
GER	Philipp Kohlschreiber	22	5
FRA	Benoît Paire	26	6
~~FRA~~	~~Gaël Monfils~~	~~31~~	~~7~~
NED	Robin Haase	43	8
GER	Daniel Brands	54	9

- ^{1} Rankings as of December 30, 2013

=== Other entrants ===
The following players received wildcards into the singles main draw:

- (Cyprus) Marcos Baghdatis
- (United States) Jack Sock
- (New Zealand) Rubin Statham

The following players received entry from the qualifying draw:

- (Spain) Daniel Gimeno Traver
- (Slovakia) Lukáš Lacko
- (United States) Donald Young
- (United States) Bradley Klahn

The following players received entry as lucky loser:

- (United States) Steve Johnson

=== Withdrawals ===
Before the tournament

- (United States) Brian Baker → replaced by (Poland) Michał Przysiężny
- (France) Gaël Monfils (fatigue) → replaced by (United States) Steve Johnson
- (Spain) Tommy Robredo (right arm injury) → replaced by (Colombia) Santiago Giraldo

== ATP doubles main-draw entrants ==
=== Seeds ===
Country	Player	Country	Player	Rank^{1}	Seed
AUT	Alexander Peya	BRA	Bruno Soares	7	1
AUT	Julian Knowle	BRA	Marcelo Melo	40	2
MEX	Santiago González	USA	Scott Lipsky	64	3
SWE	Johan Brunström	AUT	Oliver Marach	84	4

- ^{1} Rankings as of December 30, 2013

=== Other entrants ===
The following pairs received wildcards into the doubles main draw:

- (United Kingdom) Colin Fleming / (United Kingdom) Ross Hutchins
- (New Zealand) Jose Rubin Statham / (New Zealand) Michael Venus

The following pair received entry as alternates:

- (Spain) Roberto Bautista Agut / (Spain) Daniel Gimeno Traver

=== Withdrawals ===
Before the tournament

- (Poland) Michał Przysiężny (illness)

During the tournament

- (United Kingdom) Jamie Murray (back injury)

== See also ==
- 2014 ASB Classic – women's tournament
