= 2015 Heineken Open – Singles =

Singles
- 2015 Heineken Open

Final
- Champion: (Czech Republic) Jiří Veselý
- Runner-up: (France) Adrian Mannarino
- Score: 6–3, 6–2

Details
- Draw: 28 (4 Q / 3 WC )
- Seeds: 8

Events
Singles	Doubles
← 2014 ·	ATP Auckland Open	· 2016 →

John Isner was the defending champion, but withdrew to concentrate on preparing for the Australian Open.
Jiří Veselý won the title, defeating Adrian Mannarino in the final, 6–3, 6–2.

== Seeds ==
The top four seeds receive a bye into the second round.

1. (Spain) David Ferrer (withdrew)
2. (Latvia) Ernests Gulbis (second round)
3. (Spain) Roberto Bautista Agut (second round, retired because of illness)
4. (South Africa) Kevin Anderson (semifinals)
5. (Spain) Tommy Robredo (withdrew because of an adductor injury)
6. (Colombia) Santiago Giraldo (first round)
7. (Spain) Guillermo García López (first round)
8. (United States) Steve Johnson (quarterfinals)
9. (Chinese Taipei) Lu Yen-hsun (second round)

== Draw ==
=== Key ===
- Q = Qualifier
- WC = Wild card
- LL = Lucky loser
- Alt = Alternate
- SE = Special exempt
- PR = Protected ranking
- ITF = ITF entry
- JE = Junior exempt
- w/o = Walkover
- r = Retired
- d = Defaulted
- SR = Special ranking

=== Finals ===
Semifinals
LL	(France) Lucas Pouille	4	6	5
(France) Adrian Mannarino	6	3	7
4	(South Africa) Kevin Anderson	4	6^{4}
Q	(Czech Republic) Jiří Veselý	6	7^{7}

Final
(France) Adrian Mannarino	3	2
Q	(Czech Republic) Jiří Veselý	6	6

=== Top half ===
First round
WC	(New Zealand) M Venus	5	6	7^{9}
Q	(Colombia) A González	7	3	6^{7}
(Italy) P Lorenzi	4	3
(Spain) A Ramos Viñolas	6	6
(Argentina) J Mónaco	4	6	1
9	(Chinese Taipei) Y-h Lu	6	2	6
(France) A Mannarino	6	6
(Argentina) F Delbonis	1	1
LL	(Colombia) A Falla	6	6
WC	(New Zealand) JR Statham	4	4
Q	(France) K de Schepper	6	6
6	(Colombia) S Giraldo	2	3

Second round
LL	(France) L Pouille	7	6
WC	(New Zealand) M Venus	5	4
(Spain) A Ramos Viñolas	6	6
9	(Chinese Taipei) Y-h Lu	2	4
3	(Spain) R Bautista Agut	2	1^{r}
(France) A Mannarino	6	2
LL	(Colombia) A Falla	6	6
Q	(France) K de Schepper	2	4

Quarterfinals
LL	(France) L Pouille	6	6
(Spain) A Ramos Viñolas	3	2
(France) A Mannarino	6	6
LL	(Colombia) A Falla	3	1

Semifinals
LL	(France) L Pouille	4	6	5
(France) A Mannarino	6	3	7

=== Bottom half ===
First round
8	(United States) S Johnson	7	6
(Portugal) J Sousa	5	4
WC	(Croatia) B Ćorić	4	3
(Spain) P Carreño Busta	6	6
(Austria) D Thiem	7^{8}	4	3
(Germany) J-L Struff	6^{6}	6	6
7	(Spain) G García López	2	6	1
(Argentina) D Schwartzman	6	4	6
(United States) D Young	6^{2}	6	6
Q	(Japan) G Soeda	7^{7}	1	3
Q	(Czech Republic) J Veselý	6	7^{7}
(Brazil) T Bellucci	3	6^{4}

Second round
8	(United States) S Johnson	6^{3}	6	6
(Spain) P Carreño Busta	7^{7}	4	1
(Germany) J-L Struff	6^{6}	1
4	(South Africa) K Anderson	7^{8}	6
(Argentina) D Schwartzman	6	4	1
(United States) D Young	2	6	6
Q	(Czech Republic) J Veselý	6	3	6
2	(Latvia) E Gulbis	2	6	1

Quarterfinals
8	(United States) S Johnson	4	6^{8}
4	(South Africa) K Anderson	6	7^{10}
(United States) D Young	2	3
Q	(Czech Republic) J Veselý	6	6

Semifinals
4	(South Africa) K Anderson	4	6^{4}
Q	(Czech Republic) J Veselý	6	7^{7}

== Qualifying ==
=== Seeds ===
The top seven seeds receive a bye into the second round.

1. (Czech Republic) Jiří Veselý (qualified)
2. (Slovenia) Blaž Rola (second round)
3. (Netherlands) Robin Haase (second round, retired)
4. (Slovakia) Lukáš Lacko (second round)
5. (Japan) Go Soeda (qualified)
6. (Argentina) Máximo González (second round)
7. (France) Kenny de Schepper (qualified)
8. (Colombia) Alejandro González (qualified)

=== Qualifiers ===
1. (Czech Republic) Jiří Veselý
2. (France) Kenny de Schepper
3. (Japan) Go Soeda
4. (Colombia) Alejandro González

=== Lucky losers ===
1. (Colombia) Alejandro Falla
2. (France) Lucas Pouille

=== Draw ===
==== First qualifier ====
First round				Second round				Qualifying competition
				1	(Czech Republic) Jiří Veselý	6	6
(Italy) Thomas Fabbiano	4	6	6		(Italy) Thomas Fabbiano	3	3
(Croatia) Mate Pavić	6	2	3					1	(Czech Republic) Jiří Veselý	6	6
(France) Lucas Pouille	7	6							(France) Lucas Pouille	4	3
(Brazil) Bruno Soares	5	2			(France) Lucas Pouille	7^{10}	6
				6	(Argentina) Máximo González	6^{8}	4

==== Second qualifier ====
First round					Second round					Qualifying competition
					2	(Slovenia) Blaž Rola	6^{1}	2
	(Colombia) Alejandro Falla	7	5	6		(Colombia) Alejandro Falla	7^{7}	6
WC	(New Zealand) Finn Tearney	5	7	2							(Colombia) Alejandro Falla	6^{3}	6^{5}
(New Zealand) Marcus Daniell		6	6							7	(France) Kenny de Schepper	7^{7}	7^{7}
(United States) Andrew Carter		3	4			(New Zealand) Marcus Daniell	2	7^{8}	5
					7	(France) Kenny de Schepper	6	6^{6}	7

==== Third qualifier ====
First round				Second round				Qualifying competition
				3	(Netherlands) Robin Haase	6^{5}	1^{r}
(Italy) Luca Vanni	2	6	3		(France) Jules Marie	7^{7}	5
(France) Jules Marie	6	0	6						(France) Jules Marie	4	6	4
(New Zealand) Ben McLachlan	5	6	0					5	(Japan) Go Soeda	6	4	6
(Chinese Taipei) Huang Liang-chi	7	1	6		(Chinese Taipei) Huang Liang-chi	2	2
				5	(Japan) Go Soeda	6	6

==== Fourth qualifier ====
First round
(Chinese Taipei) Chen Ti	6^{4}	5
(France) Stéphane Robert	7^{7}	7
(Germany) Frank Moser	4	5
(Austria) Oliver Marach	6	7
(New Zealand) Alexander Klintcharov	5	0
8	(Colombia) Alejandro González	7	6

Second round
4	(Slovakia) Lukáš Lacko	6^{4}	4
(France) Stéphane Robert	7^{7}	6
(Austria) Oliver Marach	6^{2}	3
8	(Colombia) Alejandro González	7^{7}	6

Qualifying competition
(France) Stéphane Robert	4	6	6^{5}
8	(Colombia) Alejandro González	6	4	7^{7}
