= David Ferrer career statistics =

This is a list of the main career statistics of professional tennis player David Ferrer.

Career finals
Discipline	Type	Won	Lost	Total	WR
Singles	Grand Slam	–	1	1	0.00
Singles	ATP Finals	–	1	1	0.00
Singles	ATP Masters 1000 (Note: ATP Masters Series" (2004–2008))	1	6	7	0.14
Singles	Olympic Games	–	–	–	–
Singles	ATP Tour 500	10	9	19	0.52
Singles	ATP Tour 250	16	8	24	0.65
Singles	Total	27	25	52	0.51
Doubles	Grand Slam	–	–	–	–
Doubles	ATP Finals	–	–	–	–
Doubles	ATP Masters 1000	–	–	–	–
Doubles	Olympic Games	–	–	–	–
Doubles	ATP Tour 500	1	1	2	0.50
Doubles	ATP Tour 250	1	–	1	1.00
Doubles	Total	2	1	3	0.67
Total		29	26	55	0.51

== Performance timelines ==
Key
W	F	SF	QF	#R	RR	Q#	P#	DNQ	A	Z#	PO	G	S	B	NMS	NTI	P	NH

(W) winner; (F) finalist; (SF) semifinalist; (QF) quarterfinalist; (#R) rounds 4, 3, 2, 1; (RR) round-robin stage; (Q#) qualification round; (P#) preliminary round; (DNQ) did not qualify; (A) absent; (Z#) Davis/Fed Cup Zonal Group (with number indication) or (PO) play-off; (G) gold, (S) silver or (B) bronze Olympic/Paralympic medal; (NMS) not a Masters tournament; (NTI) not a Tier I tournament; (P) postponed; (NH) not held; (SR) strike rate (events won / competed); (W–L) win–loss record.

=== Singles ===
Tournament	2002	2003	2004	2005	2006	2007	2008	2009	2010	2011	2012	2013	2014	2015	2016	2017	2018	2019	SR	W–L	Win%
Grand Slam tournaments
Australian Open	A	1R	2R	1R	4R	4R	QF	3R	2R	SF	QF	SF	QF	4R	QF	3R	1R	A	0 / 16	41–16	72%
French Open	Q2	2R	2R	QF	3R	3R	QF	3R	3R	4R	SF	F	QF	QF	4R	2R	1R	A	0 / 16	44–16	73%
Wimbledon	A	2R	2R	1R	4R	2R	3R	3R	4R	4R	QF	QF	2R	A	2R	3R	1R	A	0 / 15	28–15	65%
US Open	A	1R	1R	3R	3R	SF	3R	2R	4R	4R	SF	QF	3R	3R	3R	1R	1R	A	0 / 16	33–16	67%
Win–loss	0–0	2–4	3–4	6–4	10–4	11–4	12–4	7–4	9–4	14–4	18–4	19–4	11–4	9–3	10–4	5–4	0–4	0–0	0 / 63	145–63	70%
Year–End Championship
ATP Finals	DNQ					F	DNQ		RR	SF	RR	RR	RR	RR	DNQ				0 / 7	8–14	36%
ATP Masters 1000
Indian Wells Masters	A	1R	1R	3R	2R	QF	3R	4R	2R	2R	3R	2R	A	3R	A	A	3R	A	0 / 13	11–13	46%
Miami Open	A	1R	1R	SF	SF	4R	2R	4R	4R	QF	QF	F	4R	QF	3R	2R	3R	3R	0 / 17	34–17	67%
Monte-Carlo Masters	A	1R	A	QF	QF	QF	QF	3R	SF	F	2R	A	SF	QF	A	A	A	A	0 / 11	26–11	70%
Madrid Open	Q1	2R	1R	QF	2R	2R	2R	2R	SF	QF	QF	QF	SF	QF	3R	3R	A	2R	0 / 16	23–16	59%
Hamburg Masters	A	1R	QF	1R	QF	QF	3R	ATP Tour 500											0 / 6	10–6	63%
Rome Masters	A	2R	3R	SF	1R	1R	2R	1R	F	A	SF	QF	QF	SF	3R	2R	1R	A	0 / 15	24–15	62%
Canadian Open	A	A	2R	2R	1R	2R	3R	2R	1R	A	A	2R	QF	A	A	3R	1R	A	0 / 11	9–11	45%
Cincinnati Masters	A	A	1R	2R	QF	QF	2R	3R	3R	3R	2R	3R	F	A	1R	SF	1R	A	0 / 14	21–14	60%
Shanghai Masters	NH							2R	3R	F	A	3R	QF	2R	1R	A	A	A	0 / 7	10–7	59%
Paris Masters	A	A	1R	QF	2R	QF	2R	A	3R	QF	W	F	QF	SF	2R	1R	A	A	1 / 14	21–12	64%
Win–loss	0–0	2–6	6–8	20–9	13–9	17–9	5–9	11–8	20–9	16–7	14–6	13–8	20–8	14–7	5–6	8–6	2–5	3–2	1 / 124	189–122	61%
National representation
Summer Olympics	NH		A	NH			1R	NH			3R	NH			2R	NH			0 / 3	3–3	50%
Davis Cup	A	A	A	A	PO	QF	W	W	QF	W	F	A	A	PO	PO	A	A	A	3 / 9	28–5	85%
Career statistics
	2002	2003	2004	2005	2006	2007	2008	2009	2010	2011	2012	2013	2014	2015	2016	2017	2018	2019	Career		
Tournaments	7	27	31	28	25	25	23	24	23	20	22	24	25	19	23	22	17	6	391		
Titles	1	0	0	0	1	3	2	0	2	2	7	2	1	5	0	1	0	0	27		
Finals	2	1	0	1	1	4	3	2	5	6	8	9	4	5	0	1	0	0	52		
Hard win–loss	0–1	6–10	3–10	16–11	17–13	37–14	16–15	21–13	26–16	32–12	33–8	35–16	28–15	36–10	19–12	11–10	6–10	4–3	12 / 204	346–199	63%
Clay win–loss	10–4	13–16	22–15	25–15	18–8	22–7	21–7	20–8	31–7	24–6	32–5	21–6	25–8	19–5	15–7	11–8	2–6	4–3	13 / 150	335–141	70%
Grass win–loss	0–0	1–1	1–3	0–1	3–1	1–1	7–1	4–2	3–1	3–1	11–2	4–2	1–1	0–1	2–3	2–3	1–2	0–0	2 / 28	44–26	63%
Carpet win–loss	0–1	0–0	3–3	2–2	3–4	1–1	0–0	Discontinued											0 / 9	9–11	45%
Overall win–loss	10–6	20–27	29–31	43–29	41–26	61–23	44–23	45–23	60–24	59–19	76–15	60–24	54–24	55–16	36–22	24–21	9–18	8–6	27 / 391	734–377	66%
Win (%)	63%	43%	48%	60%	61%	73%	66%	66%	71%	76%	84%	71%	69%	77%	62%	53%	33%	57%	66.07%		
Year-end ranking	59	71	49	14	14	5	12	17	7	5	5	3	10	7	21	37	126	-	$31,483,911		

=== Doubles ===
Tournament	2003	2004	2005	2006	2007	2008	2009	2010	2011	2012	2013	2014	2015	2016	2017	2018	2019	W–L
Grand Slam tournaments
Australian Open	1R	1R	3R	2R	A	A	1R	A	A	A	A	A	A	A	A	A	A	3–5
French Open	1R	1R	1R	1R	A	A	2R	A	A	A	A	A	A	A	A	A	A	1–4
Wimbledon	1R	1R	1R	1R	A	A	1R	A	A	A	A	A	A	A	A	1R	A	0–6
US Open	1R	2R	1R	2R	A	A	A	A	A	A	A	A	A	A	A	A	A	2–4
Win–loss	0–4	1–4	2–4	2–4	0–0	0–0	1–2	0–0	0–0	0–0	0–0	0–0	0–0	0–0	0–0	0–1	0–0	6–19
National representation
Summer Olympics	NH	A	NH			2R	NH			4th	NH			QF	NH			6–4

== Significant finals ==
=== Grand Slam finals ===
==== Singles: 1 (1 runner-up) ====
Result	Year	Championship	Surface	Opponent	Score
Loss	2013	French Open	Clay	(Spain) Rafael Nadal	3–6, 2–6, 3–6

=== Year-end championship finals ===
==== Singles: 1 (1 runner-up) ====
Result	Year	Championship	Surface	Opponent	Score
Loss	2007	Shanghai	Hard (i)	(Switzerland) Roger Federer	2–6, 3–6, 2–6

=== Olympic medal match ===
==== Doubles: 1 Bronze Medal match (0–1) ====
Result	Year	Tournament	Surface	Partner	Opponents	Score
4th place	2012	London Olympics	Grass	(Spain) Feliciano López	(France) Julien Benneteau (France) Richard Gasquet	6–7^{(4–7)}, 2–6

=== Masters 1000 finals ===
==== Singles: 7 (1 title, 6 runners-up) ====
Result	Year	Tournament	Surface	Opponent	Score
Loss	2010	Rome Masters	Clay	(Spain) Rafael Nadal	5–7, 2–6
Loss	2011	Monte Carlo Masters	Clay	(Spain) Rafael Nadal	4–6, 5–7
Loss	2011	Shanghai Masters	Hard	(United Kingdom) Andy Murray	5–7, 4–6
Win	2012	Paris Masters	Hard (i)	(Poland) Jerzy Janowicz	6–4, 6–3
Loss	2013	Miami Masters	Hard	(United Kingdom) Andy Murray	6–2, 4–6, 6–7^{(1–7)}
Loss	2013	Paris Masters	Hard (i)	(Serbia) Novak Djokovic	5–7, 5–7
Loss	2014	Cincinnati Masters	Hard	(Switzerland) Roger Federer	3–6, 6–1, 2–6

== ATP career finals ==
=== Singles: 52 (27 titles, 25 runner-ups) ===
Legend Grand Slam (0–1) ATP Finals (0–1) ATP Masters 1000 (1–6) ATP 500 Series (10–9) ATP 250 Series (16–8)	Titles by surface Hard (12–10) Clay (13–15) Grass (2–0) Carpet (0–0)	Titles by setting Outdoor (22–20) Indoor (5–5)

Result	W–L	Date	Tournament	Tier	Surface	Opponent	Score
Loss	0–1	Jul 2002	Croatia Open, Croatia	International	Clay	(Spain) Carlos Moyá	2–6, 3–6
Win	1–1	Sep 2002	Romanian Open, Romania	International	Clay	(Argentina) José Acasuso	6–3, 6–2
Loss	1–2	Aug 2003	Sopot Open, Poland	International	Clay	(Argentina) Guillermo Coria	5–7, 1–6
Loss	1–3	Apr 2005	Valencia Open, Spain	International	Clay	(Russia) Igor Andreev	3–6, 7–5, 3–6
Win	2–3	Jul 2006	Stuttgart Open, Germany	Intl. Gold	Clay	(Argentina) José Acasuso	6–4, 3–6, 6–7^{(3–7)}, 7–5, 6–4
Win	3–3	Jan 2007	Auckland Open, New Zealand	International	Hard	(Spain) Tommy Robredo	6–4, 6–2
Win	4–3	Jul 2007	Swedish Open, Sweden	International	Clay	(Spain) Nicolás Almagro	6–1, 6–2
Win	5–3	Oct 2007	Japan Open, Japan	Intl. Gold	Hard	(France) Richard Gasquet	6–1, 6–2
Loss	5–4	Nov 2007	Tennis Masters Cup, China	Tour Finals	Hard (i)	(Switzerland) Roger Federer	2–6, 3–6, 2–6
Win	6–4	Apr 2008	Valencia Open, Spain	International	Clay	(Spain) Nicolás Almagro	4–6, 6–2, 7–6^{(7–2)}
Loss	6–5	May 2008	Barcelona Open, Spain	Intl. Gold	Clay	(Spain) Rafael Nadal	1–6, 6–4, 1–6
Win	7–5	Jun 2008	Rosmalen Championships, Netherlands	International	Grass	(France) Marc Gicquel	6–4, 6–2
Loss	7–6	Feb 2009	Dubai Tennis Championships, UAE	500 Series	Hard	(Serbia) Novak Djokovic	5–7, 3–6
Loss	7–7	Apr 2009	Barcelona Open, Spain	500 Series	Clay	(Spain) Rafael Nadal	2–6, 5–7
Loss	7–8	Feb 2010	Argentina Open, Argentina	250 Series	Clay	(Spain) Juan Carlos Ferrero	7–5, 4–6, 3–6
Win	8–8	Feb 2010	Mexican Open, Mexico	500 Series	Clay	(Spain) Juan Carlos Ferrero	6–3, 3–6, 6–1
Loss	8–9	May 2010	Italian Open, Italy	Masters 1000	Clay	(Spain) Rafael Nadal	5–7, 2–6
Loss	8–10	Oct 2010	China Open, China	500 Series	Hard	(Serbia) Novak Djokovic	2–6, 4–6
Win	9–10	Nov 2010	Valencia Open, Spain (2)	500 Series	Hard (i)	(Spain) Marcel Granollers	7–5, 6–3
Win	10–10	Jan 2011	Auckland Open, New Zealand (2)	250 Series	Hard	(Argentina) David Nalbandian	6–3, 6–2
Win	11–10	Feb 2011	Mexican Open, Mexico (2)	500 Series	Clay	(Spain) Nicolás Almagro	7–6^{(7–4)}, 6–7^{(2–7)}, 6–2
Loss	11–11	Apr 2011	Monte-Carlo Masters, Monaco	Masters 1000	Clay	(Spain) Rafael Nadal	4–6, 5–7
Loss	11–12	Apr 2011	Barcelona Open, Spain	500 Series	Clay	(Spain) Rafael Nadal	2–6, 4–6
Loss	11–13	Jul 2011	Swedish Open, Sweden	250 Series	Clay	(Sweden) Robin Söderling	2–6, 2–6
Loss	11–14	Oct 2011	Shanghai Masters, China	Masters 1000	Hard	(United Kingdom) Andy Murray	5–7, 4–6
Win	12–14	Jan 2012	Auckland Open, New Zealand (3)	250 Series	Hard	(Belgium) Olivier Rochus	6–3, 6–4
Win	13–14	Feb 2012	Argentina Open, Argentina	250 Series	Clay	(Spain) Nicolás Almagro	4–6, 6–3, 6–2
Win	14–14	Mar 2012	Mexican Open, Mexico (3)	500 Series	Clay	(Spain) Fernando Verdasco	6–1, 6–2
Loss	14–15	Apr 2012	Barcelona Open, Spain	500 Series	Clay	(Spain) Rafael Nadal	6–7^{(1–7)}, 5–7
Win	15–15	Jun 2012	Rosmalen Championships, Netherlands (2)	250 Series	Grass	(Germany) Philipp Petzschner	6–3, 6–4
Win	16–15	Jul 2012	Swedish Open, Sweden (2)	250 Series	Clay	(Spain) Nicolás Almagro	6–2, 6–2
Win	17–15	Oct 2012	Valencia Open, Spain (3)	500 Series	Hard (i)	(Ukraine) Alexandr Dolgopolov	6–1, 3–6, 6–4
Win	18–15	Nov 2012	Paris Masters, France	Masters 1000	Hard (i)	(Poland) Jerzy Janowicz	6–4, 6–3
Win	19–15	Jan 2013	Auckland Open, New Zealand (4)	250 Series	Hard	(Germany) Philipp Kohlschreiber	7–6^{(7–5)}, 6–1
Win	20–15	Feb 2013	Argentina Open, Argentina (2)	250 Series	Clay	(Switzerland) Stan Wawrinka	6–4, 3–6, 6–1
Loss	20–16	Feb 2013	Mexican Open, Mexico	500 Series	Clay	(Spain) Rafael Nadal	0–6, 2–6
Loss	20–17	Mar 2013	Miami Open, US	Masters 1000	Hard	(United Kingdom) Andy Murray	6–2, 4–6, 6–7^{(1–7)}
Loss	20–18	May 2013	Portugal Open, Portugal	250 Series	Clay	(Switzerland) Stan Wawrinka	1–6, 4–6
Loss	20–19	Jun 2013	French Open, France	Grand Slam	Clay	(Spain) Rafael Nadal	3–6, 2–6, 3–6
Loss	20–20	Oct 2013	Stockholm Open, Sweden	250 Series	Hard (i)	(Bulgaria) Grigor Dimitrov	6–2, 3–6, 4–6
Loss	20–21	Oct 2013	Valencia Open, Spain	500 Series	Hard (i)	(Russia) Mikhail Youzhny	3–6, 5–7
Loss	20–22	Nov 2013	Paris Masters, France	Masters 1000	Hard (i)	(Serbia) Novak Djokovic	5–7, 5–7
Win	21–22	Feb 2014	Argentina Open, Argentina (3)	250 Series	Clay	(Italy) Fabio Fognini	6–4, 6–3
Loss	21–23	Jul 2014	German Open, Germany	500 Series	Clay	(Argentina) Leonardo Mayer	7–6^{(7–3)}, 1–6, 6–7^{(4–7)}
Loss	21–24	Aug 2014	Cincinnati Masters, US	Masters 1000	Hard	(Switzerland) Roger Federer	3–6, 6–1, 2–6
Loss	21–25	Oct 2014	Vienna Open, Austria	250 Series	Hard (i)	(United Kingdom) Andy Murray	7–5, 2–6, 5–7
Win	22–25	Jan 2015	Qatar Open, Qatar	250 Series	Hard	(Czech Republic) Tomáš Berdych	6–4, 7–5
Win	23–25	Feb 2015	Rio Open, Brazil	500 Series	Clay	(Italy) Fabio Fognini	6–2, 6–3
Win	24–25	Feb 2015	Mexican Open, Mexico (4)	500 Series	Hard	(Japan) Kei Nishikori	6–3, 7–5
Win	25–25	Oct 2015	Malaysian Open, Malaysia	250 Series	Hard (i)	(Spain) Feliciano López	7–5, 7–5
Win	26–25	Oct 2015	Vienna Open, Austria	500 Series	Hard (i)	(United States) Steve Johnson	4–6, 6–4, 7–5
Win	27–25	Jul 2017	Swedish Open, Sweden (3)	250 Series	Clay	(Ukraine) Alexandr Dolgopolov	6–4, 6–4

=== Doubles: 3 (2 titles, 1 runner-up) ===
Legend Grand Slam (0–0) ATP Finals (0–0) ATP Masters 1000 (0–0) ATP 500 Series (1–1) ATP 250 Series (1–0)	Titles by surface Hard (0–0) Clay (2–1) Grass (0–0) Carpet (0–0)	Titles by setting Outdoor (2–1) Indoor (0–0)

Result	W–L	Date	Tournament	Tier	Surface	Partner	Opponents	Score
Loss	0–1	Mar 2003	Mexican Open, Mexico	Intl. Gold	Clay	(Spain) Fernando Vicente	(The Bahamas) Mark Knowles (Canada) Daniel Nestor	3–6, 3–6
Win	1–1	Feb 2005	Chile Open, Chile	International	Clay	(Spain) Santiago Ventura	(Argentina) Gastón Etlis (Argentina) Martín Rodríguez	6–3, 6–4
Win	2–1	Feb 2005	Mexican Open, Mexico	Intl. Gold	Clay	(Spain) Santiago Ventura	(Czech Republic) Jiří Vaněk (Czech Republic) Tomáš Zíb	4–6, 6–1, 6–4

=== Team competition: 4 (3 titles, 1 runner-up) ===
Result	W–L	Edition	Date	Location	Surface	Partner	Opponents	Score
Win	1–0	2008	21–23 Nov 2008	Mar del Plata (ARG)	Hard (i)	(Spain) Fernando Verdasco (Spain) Feliciano López (Spain) Marcel Granollers	(Argentina) David Nalbandian (Argentina) José Acasuso (Argentina) Agustín Calleri	3–1
Win	2–0	2009	4–6 Dec 2009	Barcelona (ESP)	Clay (i)	(Spain) Rafael Nadal (Spain) Feliciano López (Spain) Fernando Verdasco	(Czech Republic) Tomáš Berdych (Czech Republic) Radek Štěpánek (Czech Republic) Jan Hájek (Czech Republic) Lukáš Dlouhý	5–0
Win	3–0	2011	2–4 Dec 2011	Seville (ESP)	Clay (i)	(Spain) Rafael Nadal (Spain) Feliciano López (Spain) Fernando Verdasco	(Argentina) Juan Martín del Potro (Argentina) David Nalbandian (Argentina) José Acasuso (Argentina) Agustín Calleri	3–1
Loss	3–1	2012	16–18 Nov 2012	Prague (CZE)	Hard (i)	(Spain) Nicolás Almagro (Spain) Marcel Granollers (Spain) Marc López	(Czech Republic) Tomáš Berdych (Czech Republic) Radek Štěpánek (Czech Republic) Lukáš Rosol (Czech Republic) Ivo Minář	2–3

== Record against top 20 players ==
Ferrer's match record against players who were ranked world No. 20 or higher at some stage of their career is as follows, with those who have been No. 1 in boldface:

- (Spain) Nicolás Almagro 15–1
- (Spain) Fernando Verdasco 14–7
- (Italy) Fabio Fognini 11–0
- (Germany) Philipp Kohlschreiber 11–3
- (Spain) Feliciano López 11–8
- (France) Richard Gasquet 10–3
- (Ukraine) Alexandr Dolgopolov 10–4
- (Italy) Andreas Seppi 9–1
- (Argentina) David Nalbandian 9–5
- (France) Gilles Simon 8–2
- (Spain) Tommy Robredo 8–2
- (Czech Republic) Radek Štěpánek 8–3
- (Czech Republic) Tomáš Berdych 8–8
- (Spain) **Juan Carlos Ferrero** 7–2
- (United States) John Isner 7–2
- (Austria) Jürgen Melzer 7–2
- (United States) **Andy Roddick** 7–4
- (Switzerland) Stanislas Wawrinka 7–7
- (Croatia) Ivan Ljubičić 6–1
- (Serbia) Janko Tipsarević 6–1
- (Spain) Albert Ramos Viñolas 6–2
- (Argentina) Juan Martín del Potro 6–7
- (United Kingdom) **Andy Murray** 6–14
- (Spain) **Rafael Nadal** 6–26
- (Bulgaria) Grigor Dimitrov 5–1
- (Spain) Marcel Granollers 5–1
- (Germany) Florian Mayer 5–3
- (Slovakia) Dominik Hrbatý 5–3
- (Russia) Igor Andreev 5–4
- (Argentina) Juan Mónaco 5–4
- (Chile) Fernando González 5–5
- (Serbia) **Novak Djokovic** 5–16
- (Uruguay) Pablo Cuevas 4–0
- (Germany) Tommy Haas 4–0
- (Canada) Milos Raonic 4–0
- (Latvia) Ernests Gulbis 4–0
- (Croatia) Ivo Karlović 4–1
- (Serbia) Viktor Troicki 4–1
- (Cyprus) Marcos Baghdatis 4–2
- (Croatia) Marin Čilić 4–2
- (Australia) Bernard Tomic 4–2
- (United States) Mardy Fish 4–4
- (Russia) Mikhail Youzhny 4–5
- (Japan) Kei Nishikori 4–10
- (Sweden) Robin Söderling 4–10
- (Spain) Roberto Bautista Agut 3–1
- (Australia) **Lleyton Hewitt** 3–1
- (France) Jo-Wilfried Tsonga 3–1
- (Sweden) Jonas Björkman 3–1
- (France) Sébastien Grosjean 3–1
- (France) Benoît Paire 3–1
- (United States) Sam Querrey 3–1
- (Argentina) Agustín Calleri 3–2
- (South Africa) Kevin Anderson 3–3
- (France) Gaël Monfils 3–3
- (Argentina) Gastón Gaudio 3–4
- (Argentina) José Acasuso 3–5
- (Germany) Alexander Zverev 3–5
- (Spain) Albert Costa 2–0
- (Belgium) David Goffin 2–0
- (Poland) Jerzy Janowicz 2–0
- (United States) Vincent Spadea 2–0
- (Argentina) Mariano Puerta 2–0
- (Croatia) Mario Ančić 2–1
- (Sweden) Thomas Johansson 2–1
- (Germany) Nicolas Kiefer 2–1
- (Finland) Jarkko Nieminen 2–1
- (France) Fabrice Santoro 2–1
- (Spain) Albert Portas 2–1
- (Chile) Nicolás Massú 2–1
- (Ecuador) Nicolás Lapentti 2–1
- (United States) Jack Sock 2–2
- (Argentina) Juan Ignacio Chela 2–2
- (Czech Republic) Jiří Novák 2–2
- (Spain) Pablo Carreño Busta 2–2
- (United Kingdom) Kyle Edmund 2–2
- (Belgium) Xavier Malisse 2–3
- (Russia) Nikolay Davydenko 2–4
- (United States) Robby Ginepri 2–4
- (Spain) **Carlos Moyá** 2–6
- (United States) **Andre Agassi** 1–0
- (Georgia (country)) Nikoloz Basilashvili 1–0
- (Argentina) Guillermo Cañas 1–0
- (South Korea) Hyeon Chung 1–0
- (Slovakia) Karol Kučera 1–0
- (France) Arnaud Clément 1–1
- (Brazil) **Gustavo Kuerten** 1–1
- (Australia) Nick Kyrgios 1–1
- (Belarus) Max Mirnyi 1–1
- (Russia) **Marat Safin** 1–1
- (Austria) Dominic Thiem 1–1
- (Italy) Andrea Gaudenzi 1–1
- (Thailand) Paradorn Srichaphan 1–1
- (United States) James Blake 1–2
- (France) Lucas Pouille 1–2
- (Argentina) Guillermo Coria 1–4
- (United Kingdom) Tim Henman 0–1
- (United States) Todd Martin 0–1
- (United States) Jan Michael Gambill 0–1
- (South Africa) Wayne Ferreira 0–1
- (Austria) Stefan Koubek 0–1
- (Norway) Casper Ruud 0–1
- (Netherlands) Sjeng Schalken 0–1
- (Argentina) Diego Schwartzman 0–2
- (Russia) Karen Khachanov 0–2
- (Spain) Félix Mantilla 0–2
- (France) Paul-Henri Mathieu 0–2
- (Germany) Rainer Schüttler 0–2
- (Russia) Dmitry Tursunov 0–2
- (Spain) Àlex Corretja 0–3
- (Switzerland) **Roger Federer** 0–17

=== Top 10 wins ===
- He has a 54–123 (.305) record against players who were, at the time the match was played, ranked in the top 10.

Season	2003	2004	2005	2006	2007	2008	2009	2010	2011	2012	2013	2014	2015	2016	2017	2018	2019	Total
Wins	1	2	4	3	9	1	1	7	7	9	3	2	3	0	1	0	1	**54**

#	Player	Rank	Event	Surface	Rd	Score
2003
1.	(United States) Andre Agassi	**1**	Rome, Italy	Clay	1R	0–6, 7–6^{(7–3)}, 6–4
2004
2.	(France) Sébastien Grosjean	10	Rome, Italy	Clay	2R	6–7^{(4–7)}, 6–3, 6–2
3.	(Argentina) David Nalbandian	6	Hamburg, Germany	Clay	1R	6–2, 6–3
2005
4.	(Argentina) David Nalbandian	9	Miami, United States	Hard	3R	7–6^{(7–0)}, 6–1
5.	(Argentina) Gastón Gaudio	5	Rome, Italy	Clay	3R	6–0, 6–1
6.	(Argentina) Gastón Gaudio	6	French Open, Paris, France	Clay	4R	2–6, 6–4, 7–6^{(7–5)}, 5–7, 6–4
7.	(Argentina) Mariano Puerta	10	Madrid, Spain	Hard (i)	3R	6–7^{(5–7)}, 6–1, 6–4
2006
8.	(United States) Andy Roddick	4	Miami, United States	Hard	QF	6–3, 4–6, 6–4
9.	(Croatia) Ivan Ljubičić	4	World Team Cup, Düsseldorf, Germany	Clay	RR	6–2, 6–2
10.	(Cyprus) Marcos Baghdatis	10	Cincinnati, United States	Hard	3R	7–5, 6–4
2007
11.	(Spain) Tommy Robredo	7	Auckland, New Zealand	Hard	F	6–4, 6–2
12.	(Serbia) Novak Djokovic	7	Monte Carlo, Monaco	Clay	3R	7–5, 6–4
13.	(Croatia) Ivan Ljubičić	8	Hamburg, Germany	Clay	3R	6–3, 6–3
14.	(United States) Andy Roddick	4	Cincinnati, United States	Hard	3R	7–6^{(7–4)}, 6–4
15.	(Spain) Rafael Nadal	2	US Open, New York, United States	Hard	4R	6–7^{(3–7)}, 6–4, 7–6^{(7–4)}, 6–2
16.	(Serbia) Novak Djokovic	3	Tennis Masters Cup, Shanghai, China	Hard (i)	RR	6–4, 6–4
17.	(Spain) Rafael Nadal	2	Tennis Masters Cup, Shanghai, China	Hard (i)	RR	4–6, 6–4, 6–3
18.	(France) Richard Gasquet	8	Tennis Masters Cup, Shanghai, China	Hard (i)	RR	6–1, 6–1
19.	(United States) Andy Roddick	5	Tennis Masters Cup, Shanghai, China	Hard (i)	SF	6–1, 6–3
2008
20.	(United States) Andy Roddick	8	Davis Cup, Madrid, Spain	Clay	RR	7–6^{(7–5)}, 2–6, 1–6, 6–4, 8–6
2009
21.	(Serbia) Novak Djokovic	3	Davis Cup, Benidorm, Spain	Clay	RR	6–3, 6–3, 7–6^{(7–4)}
2010
22.	(United Kingdom) Andy Murray	5	Rome, Italy	Clay	3R	6–3, 6–4
23.	(France) Jo-Wilfried Tsonga	10	Rome, Italy	Clay	QF	6–4, 6–1
24.	(Spain) Fernando Verdasco	9	Rome, Italy	Clay	SF	7–5, 6–3
25.	(United Kingdom) Andy Murray	4	Madrid, Spain	Clay	QF	7–5, 6–3
26.	(Czech Republic) Tomáš Berdych	7	Kuala Lumpur, Malaysia	Hard (i)	QF	4–6, 7–5, 6–4
27.	(Sweden) Robin Söderling	5	Beijing, China	Hard	QF	6–2, 6–4
28.	(Sweden) Robin Söderling	5	Valencia, Spain	Hard (i)	SF	6–3, 3–6, 6–3
2011
29.	(Spain) Rafael Nadal	**1**	Australian Open, Melbourne, Australia	Hard	QF	6–4, 6–2, 6–3
30.	(Austria) Jürgen Melzer	9	Monte Carlo, Monaco	Clay	SF	6–3, 6–2
31.	(Austria) Jürgen Melzer	8	Barcelona, Spain	Clay	QF	6–3, 6–3
32.	(United States) Andy Roddick	10	Davis Cup, Austin, United States	Hard (i)	RR	7–6^{(11–9)}, 7–5, 6–3
33.	(United States) Mardy Fish	8	Davis Cup, Austin, United States	Hard (i)	RR	7–5, 7–6^{(7–3)}, 5–7, 7–6^{(7–5)}
34.	(United Kingdom) Andy Murray	3	ATP World Tour Finals, London, UK	Hard (i)	RR	6–4, 7–5
35.	(Serbia) Novak Djokovic	**1**	ATP World Tour Finals, London, UK	Hard (i)	RR	6–3, 6–1
2012
36.	(United Kingdom) Andy Murray	4	French Open, Paris, France	Clay	QF	6–4, 6–7^{(3–7)}, 6–3, 6–2
37.	(Argentina) Juan Martín del Potro	9	Wimbledon, London, England	Grass	4R	6–3, 6–2, 6–3
38.	(Spain) Nicolás Almagro	10	Båstad, Sweden	Clay	F	6–2, 6–2
39.	(Serbia) Janko Tipsarević	9	US Open, New York, United States	Hard	QF	6–3, 6–7^{(5–7)}, 2–6, 6–3, 7–6^{(7–4)}
40.	(United States) John Isner	10	Davis Cup, Gijón, Spain	Clay	RR	6–7^{(3–7)}, 6–3, 6–4, 6–2
41.	(France) Jo-Wilfried Tsonga	7	Paris, France	Hard (i)	QF	6–2, 7–5
42.	(Argentina) Juan Martín del Potro	7	ATP World Tour Finals, London, UK	Hard (i)	RR	6–3, 3–6, 6–4
43.	(Serbia) Janko Tipsarević	9	ATP World Tour Finals, London, UK	Hard (i)	RR	4–6, 6–3, 6–1
44.	(Czech Republic) Tomáš Berdych	6	Davis Cup, Prague, Czech Republic	Hard (i)	RR	6–2, 6–3, 7–5
2013
45.	(France) Jo-Wilfried Tsonga	8	French Open, Paris, France	Clay	SF	6–1, 7–6^{(7–3)}, 6–2
46.	(Czech Republic) Tomáš Berdych	6	Paris, France	Hard (i)	QF	4–6, 7–5, 6–3
47.	(Spain) Rafael Nadal	**1**	Paris, France	Hard (i)	SF	6–3, 7–5
2014
48.	(Spain) Rafael Nadal	**1**	Monte Carlo, Monaco	Clay	QF	7–6^{(7–1)}, 6–4
49.	(United States) John Isner	10	Madrid, Spain	Clay	3R	6–4, 6–4
2015
50.	(Czech Republic) Tomáš Berdych	7	Doha, Qatar	Hard	F	6–4, 7–5
51.	(Japan) Kei Nishikori	5	Acapulco, Mexico	Hard	F	6–3, 7–5
52.	(Croatia) Marin Čilić	10	French Open, Paris, France	Clay	4R	6–2, 6–2, 6–4
2017
53.	(Austria) Dominic Thiem	8	Cincinnati, United States	Hard	QF	6–3, 6–3
2019
54.	(Germany) Alexander Zverev	3	Miami, United States	Hard	2R	2–6, 7–5, 6–3

== ATP Tour career earnings ==
Year	Grand Slam singles titles	ATP singles titles	Total singles titles	Earnings ($)	Money list rank
1999	0	0	0	$176
2000	0	0	0	$6,020
2001	0	0	0	$18,560
2002	0	1	1	$137,051
2003	0	0	0	$323,820
2004	0	0	0	$449,397
2005	0	0	0	$953,272
2006	0	1	1	$886,135
2007	0	3	3	$1,955,252
2008	0	2	2	$1,170,009
2009	0	0	0	$1,032,799
2010	0	2	2	$2,593,353
2011	0	2	2	$3,113,906	6
2012	0	7	7	$4,409,340
2013	0	2	2	$4,868,952	4
2014	0	1	1	$2,815,067	11
2015	0	5	5	$3,622,756	7
2016	0	0	0	$1,374,485	7
2017	0	1	1	$1,066,171	44
2018	0	0	0	$510,316
2019	0	0	0	$177,074	194
Career	0	27	27	$31,483,911	7
