= 2013 Heineken Open – Doubles =

Doubles
- 2013 Heineken Open

Final
- Champions: (United Kingdom) Colin Fleming (Brazil) Bruno Soares
- Runners-up: (Sweden) Johan Brunström (Denmark) Frederik Nielsen
- Score: 7–6^{(7–1)}, 7–6^{(7–2)}

Details
- Draw: 16
- Seeds: 4

Events
Singles	Doubles
← 2012 ·	ATP Auckland Open	· 2014 →

Oliver Marach and Alexander Peya were the defending champions but Peya decided not to participate.
Marach played alongside Daniele Bracciali but they lost in the first round to Jerzy Janowicz and Albert Ramos.
Colin Fleming and Bruno Soares won the title, defeating Johan Brunström and Frederik Nielsen in the final, 7–6^{(7–1)}, 7–6^{(7–2)}.

== Seeds ==
1. (United Kingdom) Colin Fleming / (Brazil) Bruno Soares (champions)
2. (Mexico) Santiago González / (United States) Scott Lipsky (first round)
3. (Austria) Julian Knowle / (Slovakia) Filip Polášek (semifinals)
4. (Italy) Daniele Bracciali / (Austria) Oliver Marach (first round)

== Draw ==
=== Key ===
- Q = Qualifier
- WC = Wild card
- LL = Lucky loser
- Alt = Alternate
- SE = Special exempt
- PR = Protected ranking
- ITF = ITF entry
- JE = Junior exempt
- w/o = Walkover
- r = Retired
- d = Defaulted
- SR = Special ranking

=== Draw ===
First round
1	(United Kingdom) C Fleming (Brazil) B Soares	2	7^{8}	[10]
WC	(New Zealand) D King-Turner (New Zealand) M Venus	6	6^{6}	[7]
(Germany) B Becker (Austria) J Melzer	7^{7}	7^{8}
(United States) E Butorac (Australia) P Hanley	6^{5}	6^{6}
3	(Austria) J Knowle (Slovakia) F Polášek	6	6
(Brazil) T Bellucci (Argentina) C Berlocq	3	4
(Romania) V Hănescu (Slovakia) M Kližan	6	6
(United Kingdom) J Delgado (United Kingdom) K Skupski	2	2
WC	(New Zealand) A Sitak (New Zealand) J Statham	3	2
(Sweden) J Brunström (Denmark) F Nielsen	6	6
(Poland) J Janowicz (Spain) A Ramos	6	6
4	(Italy) D Bracciali (Austria) O Marach	3	4
(Belgium) X Malisse (Germany) F Moser	7^{7}	6
(United Kingdom) J Marray (Brazil) A Sá	6^{5}	4
(Czech Republic) F Čermák (Slovakia) M Mertiňák	6	3	[13]
2	(Mexico) S González (United States) S Lipsky	2	6	[11]

Quarterfinals
1	(United Kingdom) C Fleming (Brazil) B Soares	6	6
(Germany) B Becker (Austria) J Melzer	3	4
3	(Austria) J Knowle (Slovakia) F Polášek	6	7
(Romania) V Hănescu (Slovakia) M Kližan	2	5
(Sweden) J Brunström (Denmark) F Nielsen	6	6
(Poland) J Janowicz (Spain) A Ramos	2	4
(Belgium) X Malisse (Germany) F Moser
(Czech Republic) F Čermák (Slovakia) M Mertiňák	w/o

Semifinals
1	(United Kingdom) C Fleming (Brazil) B Soares	7^{7}	7^{7}
3	(Austria) J Knowle (Slovakia) F Polášek	6^{0}	6^{3}
(Sweden) J Brunström (Denmark) F Nielsen	6^{7}	6	[10]
(Czech Republic) F Čermák (Slovakia) M Mertiňák	7^{9}	4	[6]

Final
1	(United Kingdom) C Fleming (Brazil) B Soares	7^{7}	7^{7}
(Sweden) J Brunström (Denmark) F Nielsen	6^{1}	6^{2}
