= Frederik Nielsen =

Danish tennis player

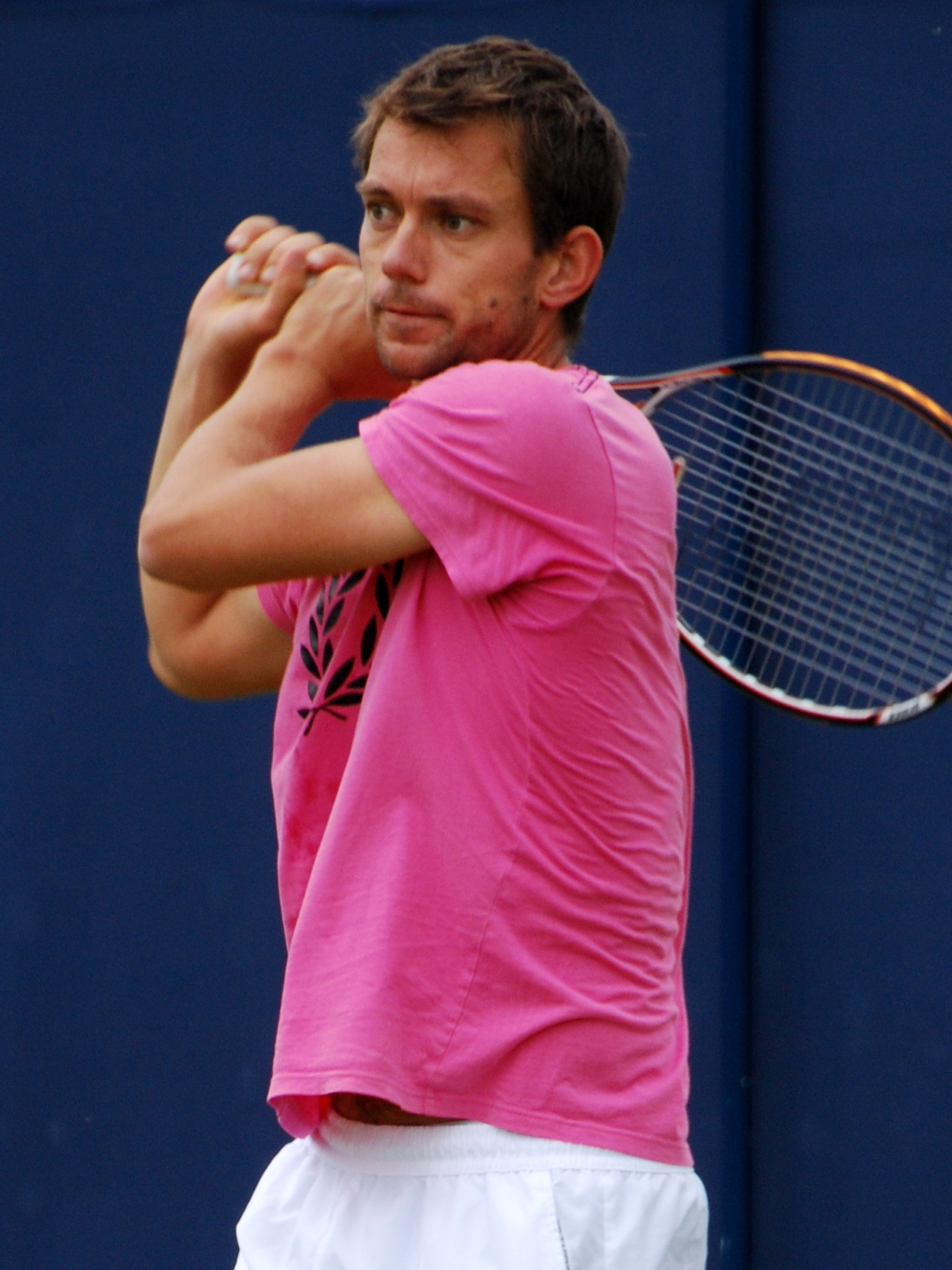
- Nielsen in 2013.
- Country (sports): Denmark
- Residence: Lyngby, Denmark
- Born: 27 August 1983 (age 43) Lyngby, Denmark
- Height: 1.90 m (6 ft 3 in)
- Turned pro: 2001
- Retired: March 2022
- Plays: Right-handed (two-handed backhand)
- Prize money: US$1,225,696

Singles
- Career record: 28–33 (Grand Slam and ATP World Tour main draw matches, and in Davis Cup)
- Career titles: 0
- Highest ranking: No. 190 (15 August 2011)

Grand Slam singles results
- Australian Open: 1R (2012)
- French Open: Q2 (2011)
- Wimbledon: Q3 (2007)
- US Open: Q1 (2010, 2011)

Doubles
- Career record: 95–75 (Grand Slam and ATP World Tour main draw matches, and in Davis Cup)
- Career titles: 3
- Highest ranking: No. 17 (1 April 2013)

Grand Slam doubles results
- Australian Open: 3R (2019)
- French Open: QF (2020)
- Wimbledon: W (2012)
- US Open: 2R (2012, 2013, 2016, 2021)

Other doubles tournaments
- Tour Finals: SF (2012)

Grand Slam mixed doubles results
- Australian Open: 1R (2013)
- French Open: 2R (2013)
- Wimbledon: 3R (2013)

Team competitions
- Davis Cup: Europe/Africa Zone Group I 1R (2012, 2013, 2015)
- Last updated on: 21 September 2020.

Frederik Løchte Nielsen (born 27 August 1983) is a Danish tennis coach and a former professional player. A Wimbledon men's doubles champion, he peaked at world No. 17 in the rankings in April 2013. Nielsen reached five other doubles finals on the ATP Tour, winning two more titles.

Having turned professional in 2001, Nielsen began competing on the ITF circuit, winning a singles title every year between 2005 and 2010. He continued to play in ITF and ATP Challenger tournaments, garnering considerable success on the doubles circuit where he won multiple titles during the period.

Nielsen made a transition on to the main ATP Tour in 2012. He represented Denmark at the Hopman Cup that year, playing a few keenly contested matches against top-ranked opponents including Tomas Berdych and Mardy Fish, while also winning in doubles with Caroline Wozniacki. Nielsen entered the 2012 Wimbledon Championships with Jonathan Marray as wildcard entrant, but the duo went on to win the tournament upstaging such higher-ranked opponents as the Bryan brothers en route to the title. He became only the second Danish player to ever win a Grand Slam title (following his grandfather Kurt) and the first wildcard entrant to win Wimbledon men's doubles title.

Partnering Johan Brunström, Nielsen reached the finals of the 2012 Moselle Open and the 2013 Heineken Open, before winning his first tour-level title at the 2014 Aircel Chennai Open. He continued to play on the Challenger tour in singles, while enjoying success in doubles on the main ATP circuit, winning again at the 2019 BMW Open.

== Personal life ==
Nielsen's parents were both tennis players and he picked up the sport at the age of three. Nielsen is the grandson of Kurt Nielsen, a former Danish tennis player and two-time Wimbledon finalist and a Mixed Doubles champion at the 1957 U.S. National Championships.

== Career ==
=== 2003-2010: ATP singles debut ===
Nielsen made his ATP singles debut in 2003 Copenhagen as a wildcard, losing to Magnus Larsson in the first round. He made his Davis Cup debut in the Europe/Africa Zone Group II tie against Tunisia at Hillerod, Denmark and defeated Malek Jaziri 6–1, 6–4 in the dead rubber, Denmark winning 4–1. Nielsen also won the singles title at the Futures event in Vietnam.

In 2004, Nielsen teamed with countryman Rasmus Nørby to win 5 Futures doubles titles. Reached 1 Futures Singles final. He won 1 doubles Futures title and 2 titles in 4 Futures singles finals in 2005. In 2006, he won doubles title at 2 Challengers and 7 Futures. Also won 3 Futures singles titles.

In 2007, Nielsen won doubles titles at 3 Challengers and Futures. 2-time singles winner at Futures. In 2008, Nielsen won 2 doubles Challengers and 1 Futures, all three with different partners. In 2009, he won 3 Challengers tournaments in doubles and 1 Futures title in singles.

In 2010, Nielsen won 2 Challengers and 3 Futures in Men's doubles. He also won singles Futures event in Italy. The following year, he won 5 Challengers doubles titles with 3 different partners; he was the finalist at 3 other events.

=== 2012: Wimbledon doubles champion ===
Nielsen represented Denmark at the 2012 Hopman Cup alongside Caroline Wozniacki, but the pair could not get past the Group Stages. Nielsen had a 1–4 Win–loss record at the event, 1–1 in doubles and 0–3 in singles. He played much higher ranked opponents in Tomáš Berdych, Grigor Dimitrov and Mardy Fish. He managed to win 1 set against Fish but eventually lost 4–6, 7–6, 6–4. Nielsen and Wozniacki still managed to pull out the doubles match against Fish and Bethanie Mattek-Sands 7–5, 6–3 and won their only tie against USA.

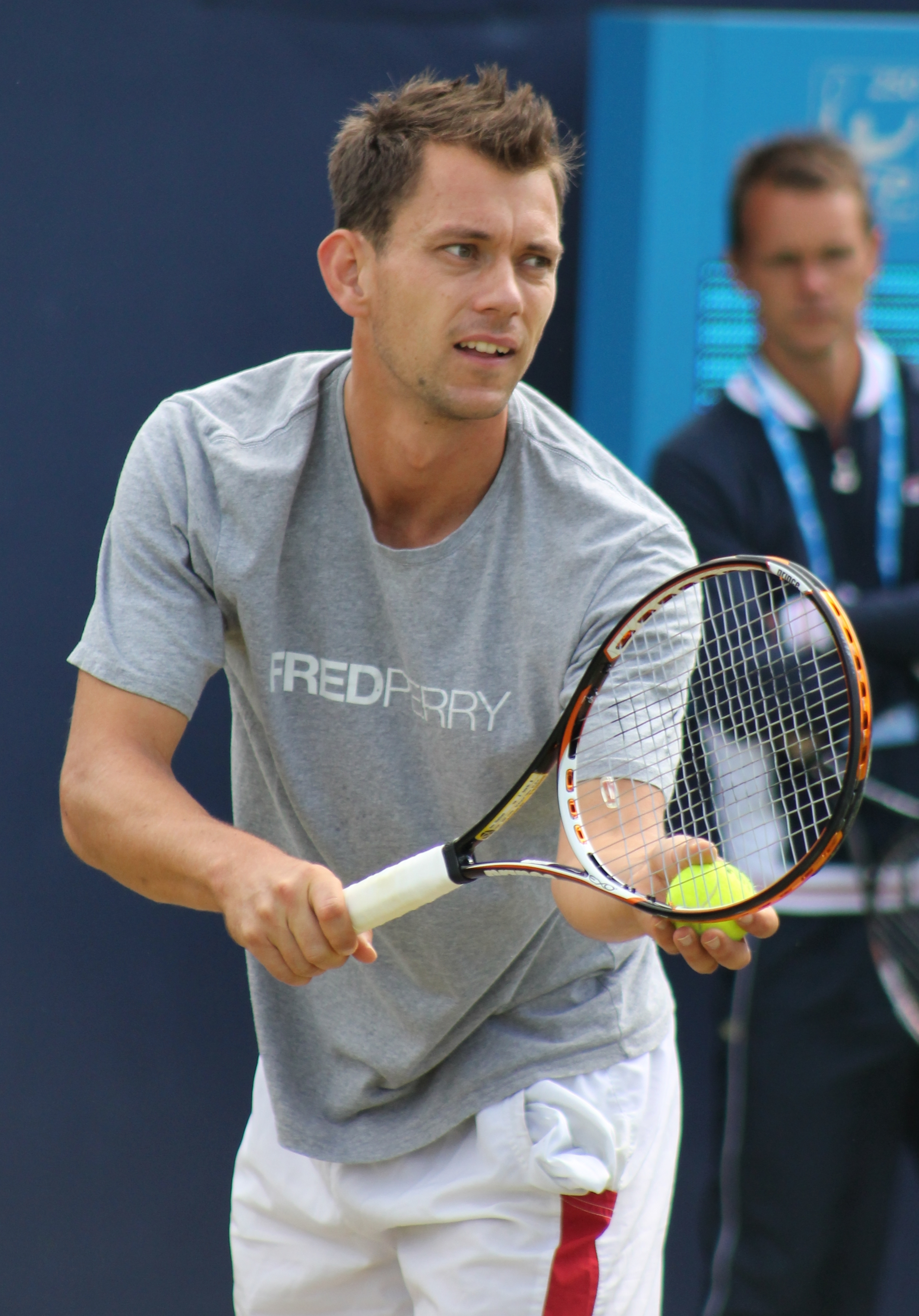
Nielsen won the 2012 Wimbledon Championships doubles crown alongside Jonathan Marray.

He then played at the Australian Open and qualified for the main draw at a Grand Slam for the first time but lost to Kevin Anderson 6–1, 6–2, 6–4 in the first round. In February, Nielsen was selected for the Davis Cup Europe/Africa Zone Group I tie against Slovenia, which Denmark lost 5–0.

Nielsen had been friends with Jonny Marray since their early days on the senior tour, but had only played together twice before in 2006 and 2008.

Playing doubles with Marray in June, their first pairing of the year, they reached the Nottingham Challenger finals, losing out to Treat Huey and Dominic Inglot in three tight sets 4–6, 7–6(9), 8–10. They compiled a 10–6 match record in 6 tournaments.

Then Nielsen and Marray received a wild card at the All England Club and began their 2012 Wimbledon Championships with a 5-set win over Marcel Granollers and Marc Lopez, one of 4 teams they beat en route that qualified for Barclays ATP World Tour Finals. In the third-round, they edged out another five set victory this time against Aisam-Ul-Haq Qureshi and Jean-Julien Rojer 7–5 in 5th set, followed with victory over James Cerretani and Edouard Roger-Vasselin in the quarters in five sets again. In the Semi-Finals they caused the biggest upset by beating No. 2 seeds Bryans in 4 sets 6–4, 7–6(9), 6–7(4), 7–6(5). In the title clash they defeated the No. 5 seeds Robert Lindstedt and Horia Tecau in 5-sets 4–6, 6–4, 7–6(5), 6–7(5), 6–3. Marray was first British doubles champion at Wimbledon since 1936 and Nielsen was first Dane to win the doubles crown.

Following Wimbledon, they played together in 4 tournaments (2–4 record), losing first round in Winston-Salem, second round at Us Open losing to Jesse Levine and Marinko Matosevic having beaten the Italian duo of Flavio Cipolla and Fabio Fognini in the first round. They had a quarter-final in Basel losing out to Mariusz Fyrstenberg and Marcin Matkowski.

Nielsen and Marray made their debut at the Barclays ATP World Tour Finals in London, qualifying for the season finale as a result of their Wimbledon crown, and reached the Semi-Finals losing out to eventual champions Marcel Granollers and Marc Lopez 4–6, 3–6. In the Round-Robin stage the pair defeated top pairs including Indian pair of Mahesh Bhupathi and Rohan Bopanna 6–4, 6–7(1), 12–10, Max Mirnyi and Daniel Nestor 7–6(3), 4–6, 12–10 losing only to Robert Lindstedt and Horia Tecau in the Group Stage.

Nielsen finished the year as top Danish player in doubles, a year-end best No. 21 individually and No. 9 in ATP Doubles Team Rankings with Marray. He also earned a career-high $334,901 in 2012 courtesy of his win at Wimbledon.

=== 2013: Doubles career high ranking ===
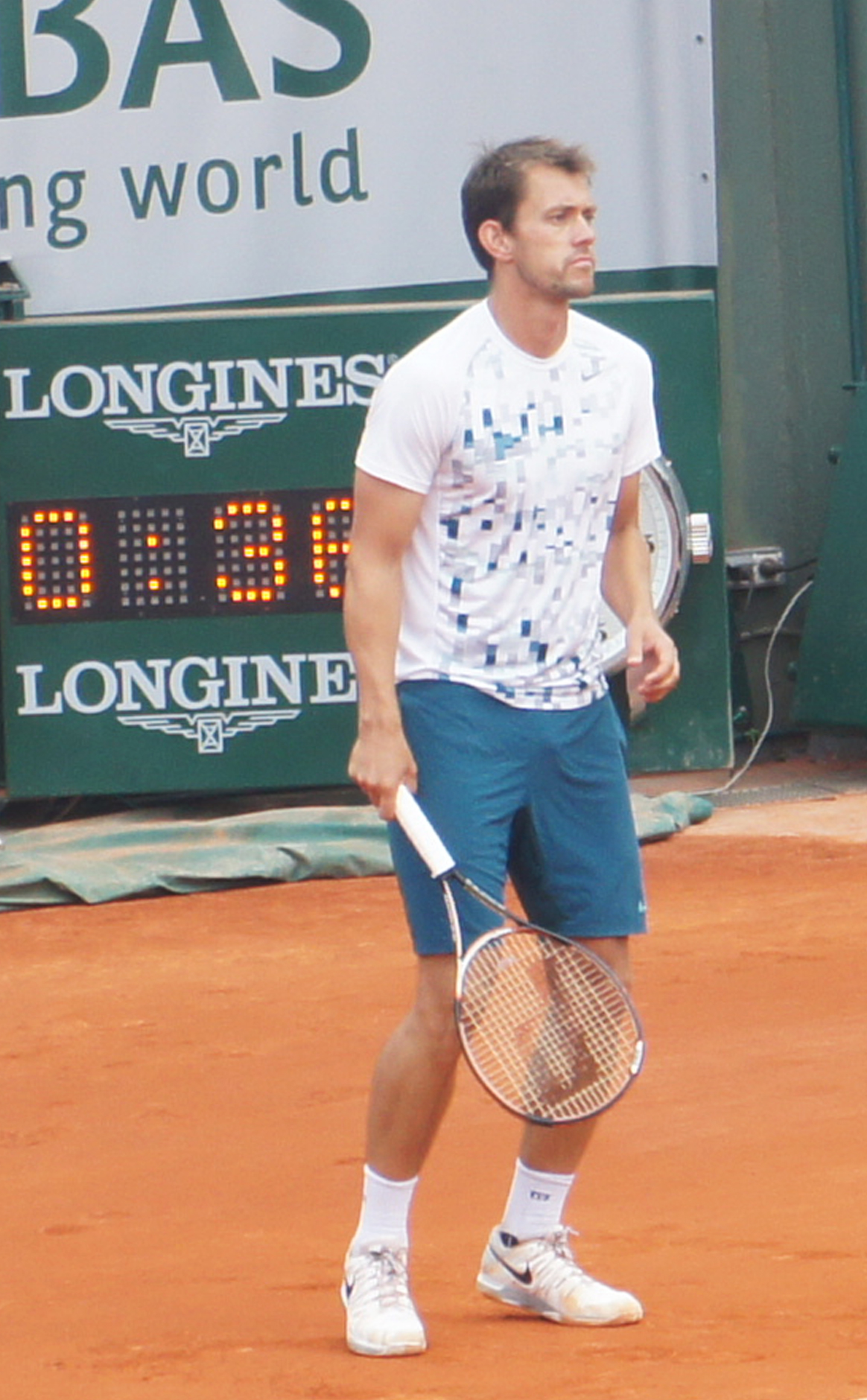
Nielsen at the 2013 French Open

At the start of 2013, Nielsen partnered Johan Brunstrom for the first time since September 2012 at Metz, they reached the final of 2013 Heineken Open at Auckland losing out to Colin Fleming and Bruno Soares in two tough sets 6–7(1), 6–7(2). Dropped to 1–2 overall in tour-level finals. They lost in the first round of 2013 Australian Open to Simone Bolelli and Fabio Fognini 3–6, 4–6.

The Dane then partnered Bulgarian Grigor Dimitrov for World Tour Masters 1000 Miami and Indian Wells reaching second round of the former and Semi-Finals his first at Masters event losing out to Mariusz Fyrstenberg and Marcin Matkowski 4–6, 2–6. Played with André Sá in 2013 Power Horse Cup at Düsseldorf and fell in the Semis to Andre Begemann and Martin Emmrich. Along with Matkowski, reached Semis of 2013 Aegon International losing to Colin Fleming and Jonathan Marray 11–9 in Match Tie-Break. Played with Eric Butorac at the 2013 Winston-Salem Open, reached Semi-Finals where they lost out to Daniel Nestor-and Leander Paes 3–6, 2–6.

=== 2014: Chennai doubles title ===
Nielsen partnered Johan Brunstrom and they entered the 2014 Aircel Chennai Open in January, the pair did not lose a single set on their route to the finals and went on to win the title defeating Marin Draganja and Mate Pavic 6–2, 4–6, 10–7. This was Nielsen's first title other than Wimbledon.

In January at Copenhagen during the Davis Cup Europe/Africa Zone Group II First Round Cyprus tie, he won both his singles and doubles matches partnering Thomas Kromann.

He then partnered Igor Sijsling for the 2014 Heineken Open and reached the quarters to only go down to the top seeds Alexander Peya and Bruno Soares 5–7, 5–7. He played at the Australian Open alongside Brunstrom and reached the second round before going down to Julien Benneteau and Edouard Roger-Vasselin in a tight three-setter 6–0, 5–7, 3–6.

Next he played at the Davis Cup Europe/Africa Zone Group II Luxembourg tie in April, winning both his singles and the doubles alongside Thomas Kromann, leading Denmark to a 5–0 victory, and to the Final Round in the Europe/Africa Zone Group II.

Partnering Brunstrom, he reached the semis at the 2014 Düsseldorf Open losing out to Martin Emmrich and Christopher Kas 0–6, 5–7. At the 2014 French Open the pair lost in the first round to Spaniards Marcel Granollers and Marc Lopez 5–7, 2–6. They next participated in the Wimbledon Championships falling in the second round.

In September, he played the Davis Cup Europe/Africa Zone Group II Denmark vs. Moldova tie, winning the first singles rubber and the doubles match but losing the reverse singles, thereby helping promote Denmark to the 2015 Davis Cup Europe/Africa Zone Group I.

He also won 3 ITF $15000 doubles titles at Switzerland, Dublin, Great Britain in March, July and October respectively with different and 1 ATP Challenger doubles title at Charlottesville Men's Pro Challenger in 2014.

== Performance timelines ==
Key
W	F	SF	QF	#R	RR	Q#	P#	DNQ	A	Z#	PO	G	S	B	NMS	NTI	P	NH

(W) winner; (F) finalist; (SF) semifinalist; (QF) quarterfinalist; (#R) rounds 4, 3, 2, 1; (RR) round-robin stage; (Q#) qualification round; (P#) preliminary round; (DNQ) did not qualify; (A) absent; (Z#) Davis/Fed Cup Zonal Group (with number indication) or (PO) play-off; (G) gold, (S) silver or (B) bronze Olympic/Paralympic medal; (NMS) not a Masters tournament; (NTI) not a Tier I tournament; (P) postponed; (NH) not held; (SR) strike rate (events won / competed); (W–L) win–loss record.
To avoid confusion and double counting, these charts are updated at the conclusion of a tournament or when the player's participation has ended.

=== Singles ===
Tournament	2003	2004	2005	2006	2007	2008	2009	2010	2011	2012	2013	2014	2015	2016	2017	2018	2019	2020	2021	W–L
Grand Slam tournaments
Australian Open	A	A	A	A	A	A	Q1	A	Q3	1R	A	A	A	A	A	A	A	A	A	0–1
French Open	A	A	A	A	A	A	A	A	Q2	A	A	A	A	A	A	A	A	A	A	0–0
Wimbledon	A	A	A	A	Q3	A	Q1	A	Q2	A	A	A	A	A	A	A	A	NH	A	0–0
US Open	A	A	A	A	A	A	A	Q1	Q1	A	A	A	A	A	A	A	A	A	A	0–0
Win–loss	0–0	0–0	0–0	0–0	0–0	0–0	0–0	0–0	0–0	0–1	0–0	0–0	0–0	0–0	0–0	0–0	0–0	0–0	0–0	0–1
National representation
Davis Cup	Z2	A	Z3	Z3	Z2	Z2	Z2	Z2	Z2	Z1	Z1	Z2	Z1	Z2	Z2	Z2	Z2	Z2	Z2	
Win–loss	1–1	0–0	4–1	4–1	1–2	1–1	2–2	1–2	4–2	1–2	1–2	4–1	2–4	3–2	5–1	2–1	0–0	1–0	0–0	37–25
Career statistics
Tournaments	1	0	0	0	1	2	2	1	1	1	2	0	0	0	0	0	0	0	0	11
Overall win–loss	1–2	0–0	0–0	0–0	1–3	1–3	2–4	1–3	4–3	0–2	1–4	4–1	2–4	3–2	5–1	2–1	0–0	1–0	0–0	28–33
Year-end ranking	660	578	414	339	331	258	268	262	236	392	618	345	375	387	609	433	–	–	–	46%

=== Doubles ===
Tournament	2003	2004	2005	2006	2007	2008	2009	2010	2011	2012	2013	2014	2015	2016	2017	2018	2019	2020	2021	2022	SR	W–L
Grand Slam tournaments
Australian Open	A	A	A	A	A	A	A	A	A	1R	1R	2R	A	A	A	A	3R	1R	1R	2R	0 / 7	4–7
French Open	A	A	A	A	A	A	A	A	A	A	2R	1R	A	1R	A	A	3R	QF	1R	A	0 / 6	6–6
Wimbledon	A	A	A	A	A	A	A	A	Q1	W	2R	2R	3R	1R	A	SF	3R	NH	A	A	1 / 7	16–6
US Open	A	A	A	A	A	A	A	A	A	2R	2R	A	A	2R	A	1R	A	A	2R	A	0 / 5	4–5
Win–loss	0–0	0–0	0–0	0–0	0–0	0–0	0–0	0–0	0–0	7–2	3–4	2–3	2–1	1–3	0–0	4–2	6–3	3–2	1–3	1–1	1 / 25	30–24
Year-end championship
ATP Finals	did not qualify									SF	did not qualify										0 / 1	2–2
ATP Tour Masters 1000
Indian Wells Masters	A	A	A	A	A	A	A	A	A	A	2R	A	A	A	A	A	A	NH	A	A	0 / 1	1–1
Miami Open	A	A	A	A	A	A	A	A	A	A	SF	A	A	A	A	A	A	NH	A	A	0 / 1	3–1
Monte-Carlo Masters	A	A	A	A	A	A	A	A	A	A	1R	A	A	A	A	A	A	NH	A	A	0 / 1	0–1
Italian Open	A	A	A	A	A	A	A	A	A	A	1R	A	A	A	A	A	A	A	A	A	0 / 1	0–1
Cincinnati Masters	A	A	A	A	A	A	A	A	A	1R	A	A	A	A	A	A	A	A	A	A	0 / 1	0–1
Win–loss	0–0	0–0	0–0	0–0	0–0	0–0	0–0	0–0	0–0	0–1	4–4	0–0	0–0	0–0	0–0	0–0	0–0	0–0	0–0	0–0	0 / 5	4–5
National representation
Davis Cup	Z2	A	Z3	Z3	Z2	Z2	Z2	Z2	Z2	Z1	Z1	Z2	Z1	Z2	Z2	Z2	Z2	Z2	Z2	Z2		
Win–loss	0–0	0–0	2–2	2–0	2–0	1–1	0–2	1–1	3–0	1–1	0–2	3–0	1–2	2–1	2–1	1–1	1–0	1–0	2–0	1–1	0 / 0	26–15
Career statistics
Tournaments	0	0	0	0	0	0	0	0	2	8	14	7	2	5	0	3	19	11	19	3	93	
Titles / Finals	0 / 0	0 / 0	0 / 0	0 / 0	0 / 0	0 / 0	0 / 0	0 / 0	0 / 0	1 / 2	0 / 1	1 / 1	0 / 0	0 / 0	0 / 0	0 / 0	1 / 2	0 / 0	0 / 0	0 / 0	3 / 6	
Overall win–loss	0–0	0–0	0–0	0–0	2–0	1–1	0–2	1–1	3–2	12–9	17–16	12–6	4–4	5–6	2–1	5–4	24–18	10–11	6–19	5–4	108–104	
Year-end ranking	1175	292	297	199	187	169	175	166	99	21	60	94	108	144	246	58	48	55	95	426	51%	

== Significant finals ==
=== Grand Slam finals ===
==== Doubles: 1 (1 title) ====
Outcome	Year	Championship	Surface	Partner	Opponents	Score
Win	2012	Wimbledon	Grass	(United Kingdom) Jonathan Marray	(Sweden) Robert Lindstedt (Romania) Horia Tecău	4–6, 6–4, 7–6^{(7–5)}, 6–7^{(5–7)}, 6–3

== ATP career finals ==
=== Doubles: 6 (3 titles, 3 runner-ups) ===
Legend Grand Slam (1–0) ATP Finals (–) ATP 1000 Series (–) ATP 500 Series (–) ATP 250 Series (2–3)	Finals by surface Hard (1–2) Clay (1–1) Grass (1–0)	Finals by setting Outdoor (3–2) Indoor (0–1)

Result	W–L	Date	Tournament	Tier	Surface	Partner	Opponents	Score
Win	1–0	Jul 2012	Wimbledon, London, UK	Grand Slam	Grass	(United Kingdom) Jonathan Marray	(Sweden) Robert Lindstedt (Romania) Horia Tecău	4–6, 6–4, 7–6^{(7–5)}, 6–7^{(5–7)}, 6–3
Loss	1–1	Sep 2012	Moselle Open, France	250 Series	Hard (i)	(Sweden) Johan Brunström	(France) Nicolas Mahut (France) Édouard Roger-Vasselin	6–7^{(3–7)}, 4–6
Loss	1–2	Jan 2013	Auckland Open, New Zealand	250 Series	Hard	(Sweden) Johan Brunström	(United Kingdom) Colin Fleming (Brazil) Bruno Soares	6–7^{(1–7)}, 6–7^{(2–7)}
Win	2–2	Jan 2014	Chennai Open, India	250 Series	Hard	(Sweden) Johan Brunström	(Croatia) Marin Draganja (Croatia) Mate Pavić	6–2, 4–6, [10–7]
Loss	2–3	Apr 2019	Grand Prix Hassan II, Morocco	250 Series	Clay	(Netherlands) Matwé Middelkoop	(Austria) Jürgen Melzer (Croatia) Franko Škugor	4–6, 6–7^{(6–8)}
Win	3–3	May 2019	Bavarian Championships, Germany	250 Series	Clay	(Germany) Tim Pütz	(Brazil) Marcelo Demoliner (India) Divij Sharan	6–4, 6–2

== ATP Challenger and ITF Futures finals ==
=== Singles: 32 (14–18) ===
Legend ATP Challenger (0–3) ITF Futures (14–15)	Finals by surface Hard (11–15) Clay (2–0) Grass (0–0) Carpet (1–3)

Result	W–L	Date	Tournament	Tier	Surface	Opponent	Score
Win	1–0	Nov 2003	Vietnam F1, Hanoi	Futures	Hard	(United Kingdom) Matthew Smith	6–4, 7–6^{(7–5)}
Loss	1–1	Sep 2004	Sweden F2, Gothenburg	Futures	Hard (i)	(Sweden) Jacob Adaktusson	7–5, 2–6, 1–6
Win	2–1	Mar 2005	Great Britain F3, Sunderland	Futures	Hard (i)	(United Kingdom) Mark Hilton	6–4, 7–6^{(11–9)}
Win	3–1	Sep 2005	Spain F23, Madrid	Futures	Hard	(Spain) Daniel Muñoz de la Nava	6–4, 2–6, 7–6^{(7–4)}
Loss	3–2	Sep 2005	Sweden F2, Gothenburg	Futures	Hard (i)	(Sweden) Johan Settergren	4–6, 4–6
Loss	3–3	Nov 2005	Australia F9, Aberfoyle Park	Futures	Hard	(Australia) Marc Kimmich	3–6, 2–6
Loss	3–4	Apr 2006	Sweden F2, Linköping	Futures	Carpet (i)	(Sweden) Marcus Sarstrand	6–7^{(5–7)}, 3–6
Win	4–4	Apr 2006	Sweden F3, Norrköping	Futures	Hard (i)	(Netherlands) Jasper Smit	6–3, 6–4
Win	5–4	Jun 2006	Ireland F1, Limerick	Futures	Carpet	(Latvia) Andis Juška	6–2, 6–2
Loss	5–5	Aug 2006	Finland F2, Helsinki	Futures	Hard	(France) Gary Lugassy	4–6, 4–6
Win	6–5	Sep 2006	Italy F29, Piombino	Futures	Hard	(Russia) Andrey Golubev	6–2, 6–4
Loss	6–6	Feb 2007	Great Britain F4, Exmouth	Futures	Carpet (i)	(France) Gary Lugassy	1–6, 6–7^{(3–7)}
Win	7–6	Mar 2007	Italy F7, Monterotondo	Futures	Clay	(Italy) Francesco Piccari	4–6, 6–4, 6–3
Win	8–6	Oct 2007	Great Britain F19, Jersey	Futures	Hard (i)	(Poland) Dawid Olejniczak	6–4, 6–7^{(6–8)}, 6–4
Loss	8–7	Nov 2007	Great Britain F21, Redbridge	Futures	Hard (i)	(Belarus) Vladimir Voltchkov	1–6, 6–4, 4–6
Loss	8–8	Jan 2008	China F1, Shenzhen	Futures	Hard	(France) Laurent Recouderc	3–6, 3–6
Loss	8–9	Jul 2008	Dublin, Ireland	Challenger	Carpet (i)	(Australia) Robert Smeets	6–7^{(5–7)}, 2–6
Win	9–9	Apr 2009	South Korea F3, Changwon	Futures	Hard	(South Korea) Kim Young-jun	3–6, 6–3, 6–4
Loss	9–10	Sep 2009	Sweden F1, Lidköping	Futures	Hard (i)	(Finland) Timo Nieminen	2–6, 2–6
Loss	9–11	Sep 2009	Sweden F2, Falun	Futures	Hard (i)	(Sweden) Pablo Figueroa	3–6, 6–4, 2–6
Win	10–11	May 2010	Italy F10, Cesena	Futures	Clay	(Netherlands) Matwé Middelkoop	7–5, 6–7^{(5–7)}, 3–3 ret.
Loss	10–12	Nov 2010	Loughborough, Great Britain	Challenger	Hard (i)	(Germany) Matthias Bachinger	3–6, 6–3, 1–6
Loss	10–13	May 2012	South Korea F1, Daegu	Futures	Hard	(Australia) Sam Groth	7–6^{(7–4)}, 4–6, 1–6
Win	11–13	Mar 2013	Great Britain F5, Cardiff	Futures	Hard (i)	(United Kingdom) Edward Corrie	6–4, 6–2
Win	12–13	Jun 2014	Spain F13, Martos	Futures	Hard	(Spain) David Vega Hernández	6–3, 6–2
Win	13–13	Sep 2014	Great Britain F15, London	Futures	Hard	(United Kingdom) Marcus Willis	2–6, 6–4, 6–4
Loss	13–14	Nov 2014	Champaign, USA	Challenger	Hard (i)	(France) Adrian Mannarino	2–6, 2–6
Loss	13–15	Jan 2015	USA F4, Long Beach	Futures	Hard	(Zimbabwe) Takanyi Garanganga	7–6^{(7–5)}, 3–6, 4–6
Win	14–15	Jun 2016	Spain F17, Martos	Futures	Hard	(France) Rémi Boutillier	6–4, 6–3
Loss	14–16	Nov 2016	Great Britain F5, Sheffield	Futures	Hard (i)	(Belgium) Maxime Authom	5–7, 1–6
Loss	14–17	Nov 2016	Great Britain F6, Barnstaple	Futures	Hard (i)	(United Kingdom) Neil Pauffley	4–6, 4–6
Loss	14–18	Dec 2017	Thailand F11, Hua Hin	Futures	Hard	(Japan) Renta Tokuda	2–6, 4–6

=== Doubles: 88 (60–28) ===
Legend ATP Challenger (32–18) ITF Futures (28–10)	Finals by surface Hard (42–19) Clay (9–4) Grass (1–2) Carpet (8–3)

Result	W–L	Date	Tournament	Tier	Surface	Partner	Opponents	Score
Win	1–0	Jan 2004	Germany F3, Oberhaching	Futures	Hard (i)	(Denmark) Rasmus Nørby	(Poland) Łukasz Kubot (Slovakia) Igor Zelenay	6–4, 6–7^{(6–8)}, 6–0
Win	2–0	Jun 2004	Finland F1, Savitaipale	Futures	Clay	(Denmark) Rasmus Nørby	(Czech Republic) Petr Dezort (Czech Republic) Adam Vejmělka	6–3, 3–6, 6–3
Win	3–0	Jun 2004	Finland F2, Vierumäki	Futures	Clay	(Denmark) Rasmus Nørby	(Netherlands) Bart Beks (Netherlands) Rick Schalkers	7–6^{(7–2)}, 6–3
Win	4–0	Jul 2004	Denmark F1, Helsingør	Futures	Clay	(Denmark) Rasmus Nørby	(Sweden) Johan Brunström (Sweden) Alexander Hartman	6–3, 6–3
Win	5–0	Jul 2004	Denmark F2, Hørsholm	Futures	Clay	(Denmark) Rasmus Nørby	(Italy) Andrea Arnaboldi (France) Nicolas Tourte	6–3, 6–0
Loss	5–1	Jan 2005	Great Britain F1, Leeds	Futures	Hard (i)	(Denmark) Rasmus Nørby	(United States) Eric Butorac (United States) Travis Rettenmaier	6–7^{(4–7)}, 4–6
Loss	5–2	Jan 2005	Wrexham, Great Britain	Challenger	Hard (i)	(Finland) Tuomas Ketola	(United Kingdom) Mark Hilton (United Kingdom) Jonathan Marray	3–6, 2–6
Loss	5–3	Mar 2005	Great Britain F3, Sunderland	Futures	Hard (i)	(Serbia and Montenegro) Petar Popović	(Slovakia) Roman Kukal (Slovakia) Ján Stančík	3–6, 6–3, 4–6
Loss	5–4	May 2005	Great Britain F7, Oxford	Futures	Grass	(Australia) Sadik Kadir	(United Kingdom) Robert Green (United Kingdom) Jim May	3–6, 3–6
Win	6–4	Sep 2005	Spain F23, Madrid	Futures	Hard	(Denmark) Rasmus Nørby	(Spain) Jorge Jiménez-Letrado (Spain) Marcos Jiménez-Letrado	6–2, 6–4
Loss	6–5	Oct 2005	Kolding, Denmark	Challenger	Hard (i)	(Denmark) Rasmus Nørby	(Australia) Stephen Huss (Sweden) Johan Landsberg	6–1, 6–7^{(4–7)}, [8–10]
Win	7–5	Jan 2006	Germany F1, Nußloch	Futures	Carpet (i)	(Denmark) Rasmus Nørby	(Germany) Philipp Marx (Germany) Torsten Popp	6–3, 7–6^{(7–3)}
Win	8–5	Mar 2006	Switzerland F3, Oberentfelden	Futures	Carpet (i)	(Sweden) Carl Henrik Hansen	(Italy) Giuseppe Menga (Germany) Frank Moser	6–2, 7–5
Win	9–5	Apr 2006	Sweden F1, Malmö	Futures	Hard (i)	(Denmark) Rasmus Nørby	(Sweden) Robert Gustafsson (Sweden) Rickard Holmström	6–3, 6–4
Win	10–5	Apr 2006	Sweden F2, Linköping	Futures	Carpet (i)	(Denmark) Rasmus Nørby	(Sweden) Ervin Eleskovic (Sweden) Carl Henrik Hansen	7–5, 6–4
Win	11–5	Apr 2006	Sweden F3, Norrköping	Futures	Hard (i)	(Netherlands) Jasper Smit	(Sweden) Ervin Eleskovic (Sweden) Carl Henrik Hansen	6–3, 7–6^{(7–4)}
Win	12–5	Jun 2006	Ireland F1, Limerick	Futures	Carpet	(Denmark) Rasmus Nørby	(United States) Troy Hahn (United States) Brian Wilson	6–2, 6–2
Win	13–5	Aug 2006	Finland F2, Helsinki	Futures	Hard	(Finland) Juho Paukku	(United States) KC Corkery (United Kingdom) Robert Searle	3–6, 6–4, 6–3
Win	14–5	Nov 2006	Rimouski, Canada	Challenger	Carpet (i)	(Denmark) Kristian Pless	(Netherlands) Jasper Smit (Netherlands) Martijn van Haasteren	6–2, 6–4
Win	15–5	Nov 2006	Shrewsbury, Great Britain	Challenger	Hard (i)	(Germany) Philipp Marx	(Germany) Lars Burgsmüller (Germany) Mischa Zverev	6–4, 6–4
Loss	15–6	Feb 2007	Bergamo, Italy	Challenger	Hard (i)	(Denmark) Kenneth Carlsen	(France) Jérôme Haehnel (Monaco) Jean-René Lisnard	3–6, 6–2, [4–10]
Win	16–6	Mar 2007	Italy F6, Catania	Futures	Clay	(Denmark) Martin Pedersen	(Greece) Alexandros Jakupovic (Czech Republic) Dušan Karol	6–4, 7–5
Loss	16–7	Apr 2007	South Korea F1, Seogwipo	Futures	Hard	(New Zealand) Daniel King-Turner	(South Korea) Im Kyu-tae (Japan) Takahiro Terachi	3–6, 3–6
Loss	16–8	Sep 2007	Grenoble, France	Challenger	Hard (i)	(Denmark) Martin Pedersen	(Netherlands) Jasper Smit (Netherlands) Martijn van Haasteren	3–6, 1–6
Win	17–8	Oct 2007	Kolding, Denmark	Challenger	Hard (i)	(Denmark) Rasmus Nørby	(Germany) Philipp Petzschner (Austria) Alexander Peya	4–6, 6–3, [10–8]
Win	18–8	Oct 2007	Barnstaple, Great Britain	Challenger	Hard (i)	(Pakistan) Aisam Qureshi	(Netherlands) Jasper Smit (Netherlands) Martijn van Haasteren	6–2, 6–7^{(4–7)}, [10–2]
Win	19–8	Nov 2007	Shrewsbury, Great Britain	Challenger	Hard (i)	(Denmark) Rasmus Nørby	(United Kingdom) Edward Allinson (United Kingdom) Ian Flanagan	6–3, 6–2
Loss	19–9	Jan 2008	China F2, Dongguan	Futures	Hard	(Denmark) Rasmus Nørby	(Italy) Paolo Lorenzi (Italy) Giancarlo Petrazzuolo	4–6, 6–7^{(1–7)}
Win	20–9	Mar 2008	Sarajevo, Bosnia and Herzegovina	Challenger	Hard (i)	(Sweden) Johan Brunström	(Austria) Alexander Peya (Croatia) Lovro Zovko	6–4, 7–6^{(7–4)}
Loss	20–10	May 2008	Aarhus, Denmark	Challenger	Clay	(Denmark) Martin Pedersen	(Poland) Dawid Olejniczak (Netherlands Antilles) Jean-Julien Rojer	6–7^{(4–7)}, 6–2, [8–10]
Win	21–10	Jun 2008	Ireland F2, Limerick	Futures	Carpet	(Netherlands) Michel Koning	(United States) Alberto Francis (United States) Nima Roshan	6–1, 7–6^{(9–7)}
Loss	21–11	Jul 2008	Dublin, Ireland	Challenger	Carpet (i)	(United Kingdom) Jonathan Marray	(India) Prakash Amritraj (Pakistan) Aisam Qureshi	3–6, 6–7^{(6–8)}
Win	22–11	Nov 2008	Toyota, Japan	Challenger	Hard (i)	(Pakistan) Aisam Qureshi	(Chinese Taipei) Chen Ti (Poland) Grzegorz Panfil	7–5, 6–3
Loss	22–12	Apr 2009	South Korea F3, Changwon	Futures	Hard	(Sweden) Ervin Eleskovic	(China) Li Zhe (China) Wang Yu jr.	2–6, 3–6
Win	23–12	May 2009	Carson, USA	Challenger	Hard	(India) Harsh Mankad	(Australia) Carsten Ball (United States) Travis Rettenmaier	6–4, 6–4
Win	24–12	Jul 2009	Recanati, Italy	Challenger	Hard	(Australia) Joseph Sirianni	(Italy) Adriano Biasella (Kazakhstan) Andrey Golubev	6–4, 3–6, [10–6]
Win	25–12	Nov 2009	Jersey, Great Britain	Challenger	Hard (i)	(Australia) Joseph Sirianni	(Finland) Henri Kontinen (Finland) Jarkko Nieminen	7–5, 3–6, [10–2]
Loss	25–13	Apr 2010	Monza, Italy	Challenger	Clay	(Austria) Martin Fischer	(Italy) Daniele Bracciali (Spain) David Marrero	3–6, 3–6
Win	26–13	Apr 2010	Italy F5, Padova	Futures	Clay	(Italy) Federico Torresi	(Egypt) Karim Maamoun (Egypt) Sherif Sabry	7–5, 4–6, [10–4]
Loss	26–14	May 2010	Italy F6, Vicenza	Futures	Clay	(United Kingdom) Daniel Smethurst	(Italy) Nicola Remedi (Italy) Andrea Stoppini	2–6, 4–6
Win	27–14	Jun 2010	Italy F11, Bergamo	Futures	Clay	(Italy) Alessandro Giannessi	(Italy) Stefano Ianni (Italy) Matteo Volante	6–4, 7–6^{(7–3)}
Win	28–14	Jun 2010	Netherlands F3, Rotterdam	Futures	Clay	(France) Alexandre Renard	(Slovakia) Ivo Klec (Netherlands) Bas van der Valk	6–3, 6–3
Win	29–14	Aug 2010	Granby, Canada	Challenger	Hard	(Australia) Joseph Sirianni	(Thailand) Sanchai Ratiwatana (Thailand) Sonchat Ratiwatana	4–6, 6–4, [10–6]
Loss	29–15	Sep 2010	Bangkok, Thailand	Challenger	Hard	(Japan) Yūichi Sugita	(Thailand) Sanchai Ratiwatana (Thailand) Sonchat Ratiwatana	3–6, 5–7
Win	30–15	Nov 2010	Loughborough, Great Britain	Challenger	Hard (i)	(Finland) Henri Kontinen	(Australia) Jordan Kerr (United Kingdom) Ken Skupski	6–2, 6–4
Win	31–15	Jan 2011	Nouméa, New Caledonia	Challenger	Hard	(Germany) Dominik Meffert	(Italy) Flavio Cipolla (Italy) Simone Vagnozzi	7–6^{(7–4)}, 5–7, [10–5]
Win	32–15	Feb 2011	Bergamo, Italy	Challenger	Hard (i)	(United Kingdom) Ken Skupski	(Russia) Mikhail Elgin (Russia) Alexander Kudryavtsev	w/o
Loss	32–16	Feb 2011	Wolfsburg, Germany	Challenger	Carpet (i)	(Germany) Dominik Meffert	(Germany) Matthias Bachinger (Germany) Simon Stadler	6–3, 6–7^{(3–7)}, [7–10]
Win	33–16	Apr 2011	Monza, Italy	Challenger	Clay	(Sweden) Johan Brunström	(United Kingdom) Jamie Delgado (United Kingdom) Jonathan Marray	5–7, 6–2, [10–7]
Win	34–16	Jul 2011	Recanati, Italy	Challenger	Hard (i)	(United Kingdom) Ken Skupski	(Italy) Federico Gaio (India) Purav Raja	6–4, 7–5
Win	35–16	Aug 2011	Segovia, Spain	Challenger	Hard	(Sweden) Johan Brunström	(France) Nicolas Mahut (Croatia) Lovro Zovko	6–2, 3–6, [10–6]
Loss	35–17	Aug 2011	Binghamton, USA	Challenger	Hard	(Philippines) Treat Huey	(Colombia) Juan Sebastián Cabal (Colombia) Robert Farah	4–6, 3–6
Loss	35–18	Nov 2011	Knoxville, USA	Challenger	Hard (i)	(Australia) Adam Hubble	(United States) Steve Johnson (United States) Austin Krajicek	6–3, 4–6, [11–13]
Win	36–18	Jan 2012	Heilbronn, Germany	Challenger	Hard (i)	(Sweden) Johan Brunström	(Philippines) Treat Huey (United Kingdom) Dominic Inglot	6–3, 3–6, [10–6]
Win	37–18	Apr 2012	Chinese Taipei F2, Kaohsiung	Futures	Hard	(Russia) Denis Matsukevitch	(South Korea) An Jae-sung (South Korea) Kim Young-jun	6–4, 6–1
Loss	37–19	Apr 2012	Kaohsiung, Chinese Taipei	Challenger	Hard	(New Zealand) Daniel King-Turner	(United States) John Paul Fruttero (South Africa) Raven Klaasen	7–6^{(8–6)}, 5–7, [8–10]
Win	38–19	May 2012	South Korea F2, Changwon	Futures	Hard	(Australia) Michael Look	(Chinese Taipei) Huang Liang-chi (Chinese Taipei) Yi Chu-huan	6–2, 6–1
Loss	38–20	Jun 2012	Nottingham, Great Britain	Challenger	Grass	(United Kingdom) Jonathan Marray	(Philippines) Treat Huey (United Kingdom) Dominic Inglot	4–6, 7–6^{(11–9)}, [8–10]
Loss	38–21	Mar 2014	Great Britain F7, Preston	Futures	Hard (i)	(United Kingdom) Joshua Ward-Hibbert	(United Kingdom) Luke Bambridge (United Kingdom) Liam Broady	4–6, 4–6
Win	39–21	Mar 2014	Switzerland F1, Taverne	Futures	Carpet (i)	(Sweden) Jesper Brunström	(Lithuania) Laurynas Grigelis (Switzerland) Henri Laaksonen	6–4, 7–6^{(7–4)}
Win	40–21	Jul 2014	Ireland F1, Dublin	Futures	Carpet	(United Kingdom) Edward Corrie	(Republic of Ireland) Peter Bothwell (Republic of Ireland) David O'Hare	6–2, 7–5
Win	41–21	Sep 2014	Great Britain F15, London	Futures	Hard	(United Kingdom) Joshua Ward-Hibbert	(Republic of Ireland) David O'Hare (United Kingdom) Joe Salisbury	6–7^{(5–7)}, 6–4, [10–8]
Win	42–21	Nov 2014	Charlottesville, USA	Challenger	Hard (i)	(Philippines) Treat Huey	(United Kingdom) Lewis Burton (United Kingdom) Marcus Willis	3–6, 6–3, [10–2]
Loss	42–22	Jan 2015	USA F2, Los Angeles	Futures	Hard	(Republic of Ireland) James Cluskey	(Bulgaria) Dimitar Kutrovsky (United States) Dennis Novikov	6–4, 1–6, [4–10]
Win	43–22	Aug 2015	Vancouver, Canada	Challenger	Hard	(Philippines) Treat Huey	(India) Yuki Bhambri (New Zealand) Michael Venus	7–6^{(7–4)}, 6–7^{(3–7)}, [10–5]
Win	44–22	Oct 2015	Tiburon, USA	Challenger	Hard	(Sweden) Johan Brunström	(Australia) Carsten Ball (Australia) Matt Reid	7–6^{(7–2)}, 6–1
Win	45–22	Oct 2015	Fairfield, USA	Challenger	Hard	(Sweden) Johan Brunström	(Germany) Dustin Brown (Australia) Carsten Ball	6–3, 5–7, [10–5]
Win	46–22	Nov 2015	Knoxville, USA	Challenger	Hard (i)	(Sweden) Johan Brunström	(United States) Sekou Bangoura (Australia) Matt Seeberger	6–1, 6–2
Win	47–22	Jan 2016	Manila, Philippines	Challenger	Hard	(Sweden) Johan Brunström	(Philippines) Francis Casey Alcantara (Indonesia) Christopher Rungkat	6–2, 6–2
Loss	47–23	Apr 2016	Gwangju, South Korea	Challenger	Hard	(Republic of Ireland) David O'Hare	(Thailand) Sanchai Ratiwatana (Thailand) Sonchat Ratiwatana	3–6, 2–6
Loss	47–24	May 2016	Taipei, Chinese Taipei	Challenger	Carpet (i)	(Republic of Ireland) David O'Hare	(Chinese Taipei) Hsieh Cheng-peng (Chinese Taipei) Yang Tsung-hua	6–7^{(6–8)}, 4–6
Win	48–24	Jun 2016	Spain F18, Palma del Río	Futures	Hard	(Republic of Ireland) David O'Hare	(Colombia) Nicolás Barrientos (Spain) Jaume Pla Malfeito	6–4, 6–2
Win	49–24	Mar 2017	Canada F2, Sherbrooke	Futures	Hard (i)	(Sweden) Isak Arvidsson	(Latvia) Miķelis Lībietis (France) Hugo Nys	6–0, 6–4
Win	50–24	Apr 2017	Saint Brieuc, France	Challenger	Hard (i)	(Germany) Andre Begemann	(Republic of Ireland) David O'Hare (United Kingdom) Joe Salisbury	6–3, 6–4
Win	51–24	Jun 2017	Spain F18, Palma del Río	Futures	Hard	(Republic of Ireland) David O'Hare	(Switzerland) Adrien Bossel (Italy) Matteo Viola	6–1, 7–6^{(7–1)}
Win	52–24	Sep 2017	France F18, Bagnères-de-Bigorre	Futures	Hard	(United Kingdom) Edward Corrie	(Netherlands) Niels Lootsma (Russia) Denis Matsukevitch	6–4, 6–2
Win	53–24	Feb 2018	Great Britain F2, Loughborough	Futures	Hard (i)	(Finland) Harri Heliövaara	(United Kingdom) Jack Findel-Hawkins (United Kingdom) Luke Johnson	6–4, 6–1
Loss	53–25	Feb 2018	Great Britain F3, Shrewsbury	Futures	Hard (i)	(Finland) Harri Heliövaara	(United Kingdom) Scott Clayton (United Kingdom) Marcus Willis	2–6, 5–7
Win	54–25	Mar 2018	Drummondville, Canada	Challenger	Hard (i)	(Belgium) Joris De Loore	(Venezuela) Luis David Martínez (Canada) Filip Peliwo	6–4, 6–3
Win	55–25	May 2018	Seoul, South Korea	Challenger	Hard	(Japan) Toshihide Matsui	(Chinese Taipei) Chen Ti (Chinese Taipei) Yi Chu-huan	6–4, 7–6^{(7–3)}
Win	56–25	May 2018	Loughborough, Great Britain	Challenger	Hard (i)	(United Kingdom) Joe Salisbury	(United Kingdom) Luke Bambridge (United Kingdom) Jonny O'Mara	3–6, 6–3, [10–4]
Win	57–25	Jun 2018	Nottingham, Great Britain	Challenger	Grass	(United Kingdom) Joe Salisbury	(United States) Austin Krajicek (India) Jeevan Nedunchezhiyan	7–6^{(7–5)}, 6–1
Loss	57–26	Nov 2018	Charlottesville, USA	Challenger	Hard (i)	(Japan) Toshihide Matsui	(Finland) Harri Heliövaara (Switzerland) Henri Laaksonen	3–6, 4–6
Win	58–26	Nov 2018	Knoxville, USA	Challenger	Hard (i)	(Japan) Toshihide Matsui	(United States) Hunter Reese (United States) Tennys Sandgren	7–6^{(8–6)}, 7–5
Loss	58–27	May 2019	Aix-en-Provence, France	Challenger	Clay	(Germany) Tim Pütz	(Germany) Kevin Krawietz (Austria) Jürgen Melzer	6–7^{(5–7)}, 2–6
Win	59–27	Nov 2019	Bratislava, Slovakia	Challenger	Hard (i)	(Germany) Tim Pütz	(Czech Republic) Roman Jebavý (Slovakia) Igor Zelenay	4–6, 7–6^{(7–4)}, [11–9]
Win	60–27	Nov 2019	Helsinki, Finland	Challenger	Hard (i)	(Germany) Tim Pütz	(Croatia) Tomislav Draganja (Russia) Pavel Kotov	7–6^{(7–2)}, 6–0
Loss	60–28	Nov 2021	Charlottesville, USA	Challenger	Hard (i)	(Philippines) Treat Huey	(United States) William Blumberg (United States) Max Schnur	6–3, 1–6, [12–14]

== See also ==
- List of Denmark Davis Cup team representatives
