= 2004 Davis Cup Asia/Oceania Zone Group I =

Tennis competition group

The Asia/Oceania Zone was one of the three zones of the regional Davis Cup competition in 2004.

In the Asia/Oceania Zone there were four different tiers, called groups, in which teams competed against each other to advance to the upper tier. Winners in Group I advanced to the World Group qualifying round, along with losing teams from the World Group first round. Teams who lost their respective ties competed in the relegation play-offs, with winning teams remaining in Group I, whereas teams who lost their play-offs were relegated to the Asia/Oceania Zone Group II in 2005.

== Participating nations ==
- Chinese Taipei
- India
- Indonesia
- Japan
- New Zealand
- Pakistan
- Thailand
- Uzbekistan

=== Draw ===
Second Round Play-offs
Islamabad, Pakistan (clay)
Pakistan | 3
New Zealand | 2

First Round Play-offs
Kaohsiung, Taiwan (hard)
Pakistan | 0
Chinese Taipei | 5
Jakarta, Indonesia (hard)
Indonesia | 5
New Zealand | 0

First Round
Nonthaburi, Thailand (indoor hard)
1 | Thailand | 5
Pakistan | 0
Kaohsiung, Taiwan (hard)
3 | Uzbekistan | 4
Chinese Taipei | 1
Jakarta, Indonesia (hard)
Indonesia | 2
4 | Japan | 3
Invercargill, New Zealand (indoor carpet)
New Zealand | 2
2 | India | 3

Second Round
Bangkok, Thailand (indoor hard)
1 | Thailand | 4
3 | Uzbekistan | 1
Osaka, Japan (hard)
4 | Japan | 3
2 | India | 2

- New Zealand relegated to Group II in 2005.
- Thailand and Japan advance to World Group Play-off.

== First round ==
=== Thailand vs. Pakistan ===
Thailand
5
SAT Stadium, Muang Thong Thani Sports Complex, Nonthaburi, Thailand
6–8 February 2004
Hard (indoors)

Pakistan
0

| | | | 1 | 2 | 3 | 4 | 5 |
|---|---|---|---|---|---|---|---|
| 1 | (Thailand) (Pakistan) | Paradorn Srichaphan; Nomi Qamar | 6; 2 | 6; 1 | 6; 0 |
| 2 | (Thailand) (Pakistan) | Danai Udomchoke; Aqeel Khan | 6; 1 | 6; 1 | 6; 2 |
| 3 | (Thailand) (Pakistan) | Sanchai Ratiwatana / Sonchat Ratiwatana; Aqeel Khan / Jalil Khan | 6; 1 | 7^{7} 6^{3} | 6; 2 |
| 4 | (Thailand) (Pakistan) | Sonchat Ratiwatana; Aqeel Khan | 6; 4 | 6; 4 |
| 5 | (Thailand) (Pakistan) | Sanchai Ratiwatana; Nomi Qamar | 6; 2 | 6; 0 |

=== Chinese Taipei vs. Uzbekistan ===
Chinese Taipei
1
Yang-Ming Tennis Center, Kaohsiung, Chinese Taipei
6–8 February 2004
Hard

Uzbekistan
4

| | | | 1 | 2 | 3 | 4 | 5 |
|---|---|---|---|---|---|---|---|
| 1 | (Chinese Taipei) (Uzbekistan) | Liu Tai-wei; Vadim Kutsenko | 0; 6 | 1; 6 | 1; 6 |
| 2 | (Chinese Taipei) (Uzbekistan) | Chen Ti; Dmitri Mazur | 2; 6 | 4; 6 | 4; 6 |
| 3 | (Chinese Taipei) (Uzbekistan) | Cheng Wei-jen / Hsieh Wang-cheng; Murad Inoyatov / Vadim Kutsenko | 2; 6 | 6; 3 | 3; 6 | 3; 6 |
| 4 | (Chinese Taipei) (Uzbekistan) | Chen Ti; Sarvar Ikramov | 6; 4 | 4; 6 | 6; 2 |
| 5 | (Chinese Taipei) (Uzbekistan) | Liu Tai-wei; Murad Inoyatov | 3; 6 | 1; 6 |

=== Indonesia vs. Japan ===
Indonesia
2
Open Tennis Stadium, Jakarta, Indonesia
6–8 February 2004
Hard

Japan
3

| | | | 1 | 2 | 3 | 4 | 5 |
|---|---|---|---|---|---|---|---|---|
| 1 | (Indonesia) (Japan) | Prima Simpatiaji; Takao Suzuki | 4; 6 | 3; 6 | 6; 4 | 4; 6 |
| 2 | (Indonesia) (Japan) | Febi Widhiyanto; Gouichi Motomura | 4; 6 | 6; 3 | 6; 2 | 3; 6 | 7; 5 |
| 3 | (Indonesia) (Japan) | Hendri Susilo Pramono / Suwandi Suwandi; Thomas Shimada / Takahiro Terachi | 4; 6 | 6^{3} 7^{7} | 1; 6 |
| 4 | (Indonesia) (Japan) | Febi Widhiyanto; Takahiro Terachi | 7; 5 | 3; 4 | | | | retired |
| 5 | (Indonesia) (Japan) | Prima Simpatiaji; Gouichi Motomura | 7; 5 | 6; 2 | 4; 6 | 2; 6 | 3; 6 |

=== New Zealand vs. India ===
New Zealand
2
ILT Stadium Southland, Invercargill, New Zealand
6–8 February 2004
Carpet (indoors)

India
3

| | | | 1 | 2 | 3 | 4 | 5 |
|---|---|---|---|---|---|---|---|
| 1 | (New Zealand) (India) | Simon Rea; Harsh Mankad | 6; 4 | 6; 1 | 7^{7} 6^{2} |
| 2 | (New Zealand) (India) | Mark Nielsen; Leander Paes | 2; 6 | 3; 6 | 6^{2} 7^{7} |
| 3 | (New Zealand) (India) | Mark Nielsen / Matthew Prentice; Mahesh Bhupathi / Leander Paes | 3; 6 | 4; 6 | 6^{4} 7^{7} |
| 4 | (New Zealand) (India) | Mark Nielse; Vishal Punna | 6; 4 | 6; 3 | 6; 1 |
| 5 | (New Zealand) (India) | Simon Rea; Leander Paes | 6; 3 | 5; 7 | 3; 6 | 2; 6 |

== Second round ==
=== Thailand vs. Uzbekistan ===
Thailand
4
BEC Tero Hall, Bangkok, Thailand
9–11 April 2004
Hard (indoors)

Uzbekistan
1

| | | | 1 | 2 | 3 | 4 | 5 |
|---|---|---|---|---|---|---|---|
| 1 | (Thailand) (Uzbekistan) | Danai Udomchoke; Vadim Kutsenko | 7^{7} 6^{4} | 6; 4 | 6; 3 |
| 2 | (Thailand) (Uzbekistan) | Paradorn Srichaphan; Dmitri Mazur | 4; 6 | 7; 5 | 7; 5 | 6; 3 |
| 3 | (Thailand) (Uzbekistan) | Sanchai Ratiwatana / Sonchat Ratiwatana; Murad Inoyatov / Vadim Kutsenko | 6; 2 | 6; 2 | 6^{2} 7^{7} | 6; 2 |
| 4 | (Thailand) (Uzbekistan) | Sonchat Ratiwatana; Sarvar Ikramov | 6^{3} 7^{7} | 0; 6 |
| 5 | (Thailand) (Uzbekistan) | Sanchai Ratiwatana; Murad Inoyatov | 6; 4 | 3; 6 | 7^{7} 6^{2} |

=== Japan vs. India ===
Japan
3
Osaka City Utsubo Tennis Centre, Osaka, Japan
9–11 April 2004
Hard

India
2

| | | | 1 | 2 | 3 | 4 | 5 |
|---|---|---|---|---|---|---|---|
| 1 | (Japan) (India) | Gouichi Motomura; Prakash Amritraj | 4; 6 | 6; 1 | 6; 2 | 6; 4 |
| 2 | (Japan) (India) | Takao Suzuki; Leander Paes | 3; 6 | 5; 7 | 6; 3 | 4; 6 |
| 3 | (Japan) (India) | Thomas Shimada / Takahiro Terachi; Mahesh Bhupathi / Leander Paes | 1; 6 | 3; 6 | 6; 4 | 5; 7 |
| 4 | (Japan) (India) | Takao Suzuki; Prakash Amritraj | 6; 4 | 6; 3 | 6; 2 |
| 5 | (Japan) (India) | Gouichi Motomura; Leander Paes | 6; 4 | 6; 3 | 7^{7} 6^{4} |

== First round relegation play-offs ==
=== Chinese Taipei vs. Pakistan ===
Chinese Taipei
5
Yang-Ming Tennis Centre, Kaohsiung, Chinese Taipei
9–11 April 2004
Hard

Pakistan
0

| | | | 1 | 2 | 3 | 4 | 5 |
|---|---|---|---|---|---|---|---|
| 1 | (Chinese Taipei) (Pakistan) | Lu Yen-hsun; Asim Shafik | 6; 0 | 6; 1 | 6; 0 |
| 2 | (Chinese Taipei) (Pakistan) | Jimmy Wang; Aqeel Khan | 6; 2 | 6; 1 | 4; 6 | 6; 2 |
| 3 | (Chinese Taipei) (Pakistan) | Lu Yen-hsun / Jimmy Wang; Aqeel Khan / Asim Shafik | 6; 2 | 6; 1 | 6; 4 |
| 4 | (Chinese Taipei) (Pakistan) | Chen Ti; Shahzad Khan | 6; 0 | 6; 1 |
| 5 | (Chinese Taipei) (Pakistan) | Liu Tai-wei; Jalil Khan | 6; 1 | 6; 2 |

=== Indonesia vs. New Zealand ===
Indonesia
5
Gelora Bung Karno Sports Complex, Jakarta, Indonesia
9–11 April 2004
Hard

New Zealand
0

| | | | 1 | 2 | 3 | 4 | 5 |
|---|---|---|---|---|---|---|---|
| 1 | (Indonesia) (New Zealand) | Febi Widhiyanto; Matthew Prentice | 6; 3 | 6; 2 | 6; 4 |
| 2 | (Indonesia) (New Zealand) | Prima Simpatiaji; Mark Nielsen | 7; 5 | 6^{7} 7^{9} | 6; 1 | 6; 1 |
| 3 | (Indonesia) (New Zealand) | Suwandi Suwandi / Bonit Wiryawan; Mark Nielsen / Lee Radovanovich | 6; 1 | 6; 1 | 7^{7} 6^{3} |
| 4 | (Indonesia) (New Zealand) | Febi Widhiyanto; William Ward | 6; 4 | 6; 3 |
| 5 | (Indonesia) (New Zealand) | Prima Simpatiaji; Matthew Prentice | 6; 4 | 7^{7} 6^{2} |

== Second round relegation play-offs ==
=== Pakistan vs. New Zealand ===
Pakistan
3
Islamabad Club, Islamabad, Pakistan
24–26 September 2004
Clay

New Zealand
2

| | | | 1 | 2 | 3 | 4 | 5 |
|---|---|---|---|---|---|---|---|
| 1 | (Pakistan) (New Zealand) | Aqeel Khan; Mark Nielsen | 0; 6 | 2; 6 | 2; 6 |
| 2 | (Pakistan) (New Zealand) | Aisam Qureshi; Simon Rea | 6; 3 | 6; 4 | 6^{6} 7^{8} | 6; 3 |
| 3 | (Pakistan) (New Zealand) | Aqeel Khan / Aisam Qureshi; Mark Nielsen / Simon Rea | 6; 4 | 6; 4 | 6; 1 |
| 4 | (Pakistan) (New Zealand) | Aisam Qureshi; Mark Nielsen | 4; 6 | 7^{7} 6^{1} | 2; 6 | 7; 5 | 4; 6 |
| 5 | (Pakistan) (New Zealand) | Aqeel Khan; Simon Rea | 7^{7} 6^{5} | 2; 6 | 3; 6 | 6; 3 | 6; 2 |
