= 2004 Heineken Open – Doubles =

Doubles
- 2004 Heineken Open

Final
- Champions: (India) Mahesh Bhupathi (France) Fabrice Santoro
- Runners-up: (Czech Republic) Jiří Novák (Czech Republic) Radek Štěpánek
- Score: 4–6, 7–5, 6–3

Details
- Draw: 16
- Seeds: 4

Events
Singles	Doubles
← 2003 ·	ATP Auckland Open	· 2005 →

David Adams and Robbie Koenig were the defending champions of the doubles event of the Heineken Open tennis tournament, held in Auckland, New Zealand, but only Koenig competed that year with Petr Pála. Koenig and Pála lost in the first round to Jan-Michael Gambill and Brian MacPhie.

Mahesh Bhupathi and Fabrice Santoro won in the final 4–6, 7–5, 6–3 against Jiří Novák and Radek Štěpánek.

== Seeds ==
Champion seeds are indicated in bold text while text in italics indicates the round in which those seeds were eliminated.

1. (India) **Mahesh Bhupathi** / (France) **Fabrice Santoro (champions)**
2. (Argentina) Gastón Etlis / (Argentina) Martín Rodríguez (quarterfinals)
3. (United States) Jared Palmer / (Czech Republic) Pavel Vízner (semifinals)
4. (Czech Republic) Tomáš Cibulec / (Czech Republic) Leoš Friedl (first round)

== Draw ==
=== Key ===
- Q = Qualifier
- WC = Wild card
- LL = Lucky loser
- Alt = Alternate
- SE = Special exempt
- PR = Protected ranking
- ITF = ITF entry
- JE = Junior exempt
- w/o = Walkover
- r = Retired
- d = Defaulted
- SR = Special ranking

First round
1	(India) **M Bhupathi** (France) **F Santoro**	**6**	**6**
(Argentina) G Gaudio (Ecuador) N Lapentti	4	3
(South Africa) R Koenig (Czech Republic) P Pála	3	2
(United States) **J-M Gambill** (United States) **B MacPhie**	**6**	**6**
3	(United States) **J Palmer** (Czech Republic) **P Vízner**	**6**	**7^{7}**
(United States) D Bowen (Spain) A Martín	4	6^{5}
(Finland) **J Nieminen** (United States) **G Oliver**	**6**	**6**
(Sweden) S Aspelin (Italy) M Bertolini	3	4
WC	(New Zealand) D King-Turner (New Zealand) M Prentice	3	4
WC	(New Zealand) **M Nielsen** (New Zealand) **S Rea**	**6**	**6**
(South Africa) **J Coetzee** (South Africa) **C Haggard**	**6**	3	**6**
4	(Czech Republic) T Cibulec (Czech Republic) L Friedl	3	**6**	2
(United States) S Humphries (The Bahamas) M Merklein	4	2
(Czech Republic) **J Novák** (Czech Republic) **R Štěpánek**	**6**	**6**
(Argentina) M García (Chile) F González	2	4
2	(Argentina) **G Etlis** (Argentina) **M Rodríguez**	**6**	**6**

Quarterfinals
1	(India) **M Bhupathi** (France) **F Santoro**	**7^{8}**	**6**
(United States) J-M Gambill (United States) B MacPhie	6^{6}	1
3	(United States) **J Palmer** (Czech Republic) **P Vízner**	**6**	**6**
(Finland) J Nieminen (United States) G Oliver	4	4
WC	(New Zealand) M Nielsen (New Zealand) S Rea	2	2
(South Africa) **J Coetzee** (South Africa) **C Haggard**	**6**	**6**
(Czech Republic) **J Novák** (Czech Republic) **R Štěpánek**	**6**	**7^{7}**
2	(Argentina) G Etlis (Argentina) M Rodríguez	2	6^{4}

Semifinals
1	(India) **M Bhupathi** (France) **F Santoro**	**6**	**6**
3	(United States) J Palmer (Czech Republic) P Vízner	1	2
(South Africa) J Coetzee (South Africa) C Haggard	5	1
(Czech Republic) **J Novák** (Czech Republic) **R Štěpánek**	**7**	**6**

Final
1	(India) **M Bhupathi** (France) **F Santoro**	4	**7**	**6**
(Czech Republic) J Novák (Czech Republic) R Štěpánek	**6**	5	3
