= 2002 Heineken Open – Doubles =

Doubles
- 2002 Heineken Open

Final
- Champions: (Sweden) Jonas Björkman (Australia) Todd Woodbridge
- Runners-up: (Argentina) Martín García (Czech Republic) Cyril Suk
- Score: 7–6^{(7–5)}, 7–6^{(9–7)}

Details
- Draw: 16
- Seeds: 4

Events
Singles	Doubles
- ATP Auckland Open

Marius Barnard and Jim Thomas were the defending champions at the doubles event of the Heineken Open tennis tournament, held in Auckland, New Zealand, but only Barnard competed that year with David Adams.

Adams and Barnard lost in the first round to Ellis Ferreira and Rick Leach.

Jonas Björkman and Todd Woodbridge won in the final 7–6^{(7–5)}, 7–6^{(9–7)} against Martín García and Cyril Suk.

== Seeds ==
Champion seeds are indicated in bold text while text in italics indicates the round in which those seeds were eliminated.

1. (Sweden) **Jonas Björkman** / (Australia) **Todd Woodbridge (champions)**
2. (India) Mahesh Bhupathi / (United States) Jeff Tarango (semifinals)
3. (South Africa) Ellis Ferreira / (United States) Rick Leach (semifinals)
4. (Argentina) Martín García / (Czech Republic) Cyril Suk (final)

== Draw ==
Key

- Q = Qualifier
- WC = Wild card
- LL = Lucky loser
- Alt = Alternate
- ITF = ITF entry
- PR = Protected ranking
- SR = Special ranking
- SE = Special exempt
- JE = Junior exempt
- JR = Junior Accelerator Programme entrant
- CO = College Accelerator Programme entrant
- NG = Next Gen Accelerator Program entrant
- w/o = Walkover
- r = Retired
- d = Defaulted

First round
1	(Sweden) **J Björkman** (Australia) **T Woodbridge**	**6**	**6**
(Czech Republic) L Friedl (Czech Republic) R Štěpánek	4	3
(Spain) **F Clavet** (Italy) **A Gaudenzi**	**6**	**6**
(Argentina) D Orsanic (Argentina) S Prieto	4	3
3	(South Africa) **E Ferreira** (United States) **R Leach**	**6**	**6**
(South Africa) D Adams (South Africa) M Barnard	3	2
WC	(New Zealand) J Olsen (New Zealand) S Rea	6^{4}	**6**	3
(Russia) **A Olhovskiy** (Japan) **T Shimada**	**7^{7}**	4	**6**
(Sweden) S Aspelin (Australia) A Kratzmann	6^{3}	4
WC	(New Zealand) **M Nielsen** (New Zealand) **J Shortall**	**7^{7}**	**6**
ALT	(Spain) G Blanco (Spain) F Vicente	5	1
4	(Argentina) **M García** (Czech Republic) **C Suk**	**7**	**6**
(South Africa) J-L de Jager (South Africa) R Koenig	2	**6**	6^{3}
(Czech Republic) **P Luxa** (Czech Republic) **J Novák**	**6**	1	**7^{7}**
WC	(New Zealand) A Hunt (New Zealand) D Willman	4	4
2	(India) **M Bhupathi** (United States) **J Tarango**	**6**	**6**

Quarterfinals
1	(Sweden) **J Björkman** (Australia) **T Woodbridge**	**6**	**6**
(Spain) F Clavet (Italy) A Gaudenzi	3	1
3	(South Africa) **E Ferreira** (United States) **R Leach**	4	**6**	**6**
(Russia) A Olhovskiy (Japan) T Shimada	**6**	3	2
WC	(New Zealand) M Nielsen (New Zealand) J Shortall	3	4
4	(Argentina) **M García** (Czech Republic) **C Suk**	**6**	**6**
(Czech Republic) P Luxa (Czech Republic) J Novák	0	4
2	(India) **M Bhupathi** (United States) **J Tarango**	**6**	**6**

Semifinals
1	(Sweden) **J Björkman** (Australia) **T Woodbridge**	**7**	**6**
3	(South Africa) E Ferreira (United States) R Leach	5	3
4	(Argentina) **M García** (Czech Republic) **C Suk**	6^{5}	**6**	**7^{7}**
2	(India) M Bhupathi (United States) J Tarango	**7^{7}**	4	6^{5}

Final
1	(Sweden) **J Björkman** (Australia) **T Woodbridge**	**7^{7}**	**7^{9}**
4	(Argentina) M García (Czech Republic) C Suk	6^{5}	6^{7}
