= 2003 Heineken Open – Singles =

Singles
- 2003 Heineken Open

Final
- Champion: (Brazil) Gustavo Kuerten
- Runner-up: (Slovakia) Dominik Hrbatý
- Score: 6–3, 7–5

Details
- Draw: 32 (4 Q / 3 WC )
- Seeds: 8

Events
Singles	Doubles
← 2002 ·	ATP Auckland Open	· 2004 →

Greg Rusedski was the defending champion of the singles event of the Heineken Open tennis tournament, held in Auckland, New Zealand, but did not compete that year.

Fourth-seeded Gustavo Kuerten won in the final 6–3, 7–5 against unseeded Dominik Hrbatý.

== Seeds ==
A champion seed is indicated in bold text while text in italics indicates the round in which that seed was eliminated.

1. (Czech Republic) Jiří Novák (quarterfinals)
2. (Argentina) David Nalbandian (first round)
3. (Chile) Fernando González (second round)
4. (Brazil) **Gustavo Kuerten (champion)**
5. (Argentina) José Acasuso (first round)
6. (United States) Jan-Michael Gambill (second round)
7. (Argentina) Guillermo Coria (quarterfinals)
8. (Italy) Davide Sanguinetti (first round)

== Draw ==
=== Key ===
- Q = Qualifier
- WC = Wild card
- LL = Lucky loser
- Alt = Alternate
- SE = Special exempt
- PR = Protected ranking
- ITF = ITF entry
- JE = Junior exempt
- w/o = Walkover
- r = Retired
- d = Defaulted
- SR = Special ranking

First round
1	(Czech Republic) **J Novák**	**6**	**6**
Q	(United States) R Kendrick	2	3
(Argentina) A Calleri	6^{5}	5
Q	(United States) **R Ginepri**	**7^{7}**	**7**
(Brazil) A Sá	**7^{9}**	5	4
(Denmark) **K Carlsen**	6^{7}	**7**	**6**
(Spain) **F Mantilla**	**6**	**7**
5	(Argentina) J Acasuso	3	5
3	(Chile) **F González**	3	**7^{7}**	**6**
(Spain) F López	**6**	6^{5}	2
(Spain) A Martín	3	2
(Spain) **D Ferrer**	**6**	**6**
(Slovakia) **D Hrbatý**	**6**	**6**
WC	(New Zealand) S Rea	4	2
(Switzerland) M Kratochvil	1	3
6	(United States) **J-M Gambill**	**6**	**6**
7	(Argentina) **G Coria**	2	**6**	**6**
(Spain) D Sánchez	**6**	2	4
WC	(Peru) L Horna	**6**	6^{5}	2
(Spain) **F Vicente**	3	**7^{7}**	**6**
Q	(United States) **M Russell**	**7^{7}**	**6**
(Czech Republic) R Štěpánek	6^{4}	4
Q	(Netherlands) M Verkerk	6^{5}	4
4	(Brazil) **G Kuerten**	**7^{7}**	**6**
8	(Italy) D Sanguinetti	3	3
(Netherlands) **R Sluiter**	**6**	**6**
(Austria) **S Koubek**	**6**	**6**
WC	(New Zealand) M Nielsen	3	2
(France) A Dupuis	3	4
(United States) **V Spadea**	**6**	**6**
(Argentina) **M Zabaleta**	2	**7^{7}**	**6**
2	(Argentina) D Nalbandian	**6**	6^{3}	3

Second round
1	(Czech Republic) **J Novák**	1	**7^{8}**	**6**
Q	(United States) R Ginepri	**6**	6^{6}	3
(Denmark) K Carlsen	4	4
(Spain) **F Mantilla**	**6**	**6**
3	(Chile) F González	4	3
(Spain) **D Ferrer**	**6**	**6**
(Slovakia) **D Hrbatý**	**6**	6^{6}	**7^{7}**
6	(United States) J-M Gambill	3	**7^{8}**	6^{4}
7	(Argentina) **G Coria**	**6**	**6**
(Spain) F Vicente	2	2
Q	(United States) M Russell	**6**	4	2
4	(Brazil) **G Kuerten**	4	**6**	**6**
(Netherlands) R Sluiter	3	**6**	1
(Austria) **S Koubek**	**6**	3	**6**
(United States) V Spadea	4	3
(Argentina) **M Zabaleta**	**6**	**6**

Quarterfinals
1	(Czech Republic) J Novák	**7^{7}**	2	6^{3}
(Spain) **F Mantilla**	6^{5}	**6**	**7^{7}**
(Spain) D Ferrer	5	3
(Slovakia) **D Hrbatý**	**7**	**6**
7	(Argentina) G Coria	5	**6**	2
4	(Brazil) **G Kuerten**	**7**	4	**6**
(Austria) S Koubek	2	1
(Argentina) **M Zabaleta**	**6**	**6**

Semifinals
(Spain) F Mantilla	2	2
(Slovakia) **D Hrbatý**	**6**	**6**
4	(Brazil) **G Kuerten**	**6**	**6**
(Argentina) M Zabaleta	3	3

Final
(Slovakia) Dominik Hrbatý	3	5
4	(Brazil) **Gustavo Kuerten**	**6**	**7**
