= List of New Zealand Davis Cup team representatives =

This is a list of tennis players who have represented the New Zealand Davis Cup team in an official Davis Cup match. New Zealand have taken part in the competition since 1924. Before that, New Zealander was represented by the Australasia Davis Cup team. Only one New Zealander competed for Australasia (Tony Wilding), though another Australasian representative, Australia's Alfred Dunlop, was New Zealand-born.

== Players ==
Player	W-L (Total)	W-L (Singles)	W-L (Doubles)	Ties	Debut
Eskell Andrews	3–5	2–4	1–1	4	1928
John Barry	1–4	1–4	0–0	3	1947
Robert Cheyne	1–1	1–1	0–0	2	2003
Austen Childs	1–0	1–0	0–0	1	2010
Scott Clark	0–1	0–1	0–0	1	1995
Dennis Coombe	1–1	0–1	1–0	2	1937
Ian Crookenden	4–9	3–6	1–3	5	1962
Marcus Daniell	2–3	1–0	1–3	4	2010
Bruce Derlin	7–8	6–7	1–1	7	1982
Alistair Dewar-Brown	0–2	0–2	0–0	1	1939
Steven Downs	3–4	3–3	0–1	3	1995
Kelly Evernden	27–27	17–17	10–10	20	1985
Brian Fairlie	20–28	13–16	7–12	19	1966
Frank Fisher	0–2	0–1	0–1	1	1924
Lew Gerrard	16–17	10–11	6–6	13	1957
James Greenhalgh	13–9	2–7	11–2	15	1994
Steve Guy	5–5	3–4	2–1	7	1985
Richard Hawkes	0–1	0–0	0–1	1	1968
Alistair Hunt	19–18	11–12	8–6	18	1995
G. D. Jones	10–3	7–1	3–2	8	2005
Daniel King-Turner	19–13	12–6	7–7	15	2005
David Lewis	4–4	1–0	3–4	7	1985
Chris Lewis	24–18	18–11	6–7	17	1977
Cam Malfroy	5–7	2–5	3–2	5	1934
Ron McKenzie	2–3	1–2	1–1	2	1947
David Mustard	2–0	1–0	1–0	1	1985
Mark Nielsen	25–18	20–13	5–5	20	1997
Mark Otway	14–6	9–4	5–2	7	1954
Corbett Parker	2–1	1–1	1–0	2	1957
Onny Parun	30–32	23–20	7–12	25	1967
John Peacock	0–3	0–2	0–1	1	1924
Matt Prentice	1–3	0–2	1–1	3	2004
Lee Radovanovich	0–1	0–0	0–1	1	2004
Simon Rea	3–6	2–4	1–2	4	2004
Jeff Robson	6–7	2–5	4–2	6	1947
James Shortall	1–4	1–3	0–1	4	2000
Russell Simpson	22–18	16–9	6–9	19	1975
Jeff Simpson	4–9	2–7	2–2	5	1971
Matt Simpson	0–1	0–1	0–0	1	2007
Artem Sitak	4–1	3–1	1–0	3	2011
John Souter	1–2	1–1	0–1	1	1962
Jose Statham	18–5	17–5	1–0	17	2005
Mikal Statham	1–2	1–1	0–1	2	2009
Alan Stedman	4–3	2–2	2–1	4	1934
Brett Steven	28–21	18–15	10–6	20	1990
Teo Susnjak	0–2	0–2	0–0	1	1998
Adam Thompson	3–2	3–2	0–0	4	2005
Michael Venus	3–7	3–3	0–4	5	2010
William Ward	0–1	0–1	0–0	1	2004
Tony Wilding (representing Australasia)	21–9	15–6	6–3	11	1905
Daniel Willman	0–2	0–1	0–1	2	2002
Glenn Wilson	1–0	1–0	0–0	1	1997
Kevin Woolcott	0–1	0–0	0–1	1	1967
Brian Woolf	1–0	1–0	0–0	1	1959
Russell Young	2–1	1–1	1–0	1	1928
