= 2001 Heineken Open =

- Date: 8–15 January
- Edition: 34th
- Category: International Series
- Draw: 32S / 16D
- Prize money: $350,000
- Surface: Hard / outdoor
- Location: Auckland, New Zealand
- Venue: ASB Tennis Centre

Champions

Singles
- (Slovakia) Dominik Hrbatý

Doubles
- (South Africa) Marius Barnard / (United States) Jim Thomas
← 2000 ·	ATP Auckland Open	· 2002 →

The 2001 Heineken Open was a tennis tournament played on outdoor hard courts at the ASB Tennis Centre in Auckland in New Zealand and was part of the International Series of the 2001 ATP Tour. The tournament ran from 8 January through 15 January 2001. Second-seeded Dominik Hrbatý won the singles title.

== Finals ==
=== Singles ===
(Slovakia) Dominik Hrbatý defeated (Spain) Francisco Clavet 6–4, 2–6, 6–3

- It was Hrbatý's 1st title of the year and the 4th of his career.

=== Doubles ===
(South Africa) Marius Barnard / (United States) Jim Thomas defeated (South Africa) David Adams / (Argentina) Martín García 7–6^{(12–10)}, 6–4

- It was Barnard's only title of the year and the 6th of his career. It was Thomas's only title of the year and the 1st of his career.
