= 2001 Heineken Open – Singles =

Singles
- 2001 Heineken Open

Final
- Champion: (Slovakia) Dominik Hrbatý
- Runner-up: (Spain) Francisco Clavet
- Score: 6–4, 2–6, 6–3

Details
- Draw: 32 (4 Q / 3 WC )
- Seeds: 8

Events
Singles	Doubles
← 2000 ·	ATP Auckland Open	· 2002 →

Magnus Norman was the defending champion of the singles event at the Heineken Open tennis tournament, held in Auckland, New Zealand, but did not compete that year.

Dominik Hrbatý won in the final 6–4, 2–6, 6–3 against Francisco Clavet.

== Seeds ==
A champion seed is indicated in bold text while text in italics indicates the round in which that seed was eliminated.

1. (Argentina) Franco Squillari (first round)
2. (Slovakia) **Dominik Hrbatý (champion)**
3. (United States) Jan-Michael Gambill (quarterfinals)
4. (Argentina) Gastón Gaudio (quarterfinals)
5. (Zimbabwe) Byron Black (second round)
6. (Chile) Marcelo Ríos (second round)
7. (Sweden) Thomas Johansson (quarterfinals)
8. (Spain) Fernando Vicente (first round)

== Draw ==
=== Key ===
- Q = Qualifier
- WC = Wild card
- LL = Lucky loser
- Alt = Alternate
- ITF = ITF entry
- PR = Protected ranking
- SR = Special ranking
- SE = Special exempt
- JE = Junior exempt
- JR = Junior Accelerator Programme entrant
- CO = College Accelerator Programme entrant
- NG = Next Gen Accelerator Program entrant
- w/o = Walkover
- r = Retired
- d = Defaulted

First round
1	(Argentina) F Squillari	6^{4}	2
(Austria) **S Koubek**	**7^{7}**	**6**
(Spain) **Á Calatrava**	**6**	1	**6**
(Argentina) A Calleri	3	**6**	3
WC	(United Kingdom) **G Rusedski**	**6**	**6**
WC	(New Zealand) M Nielsen	4	4
(Spain) A Portas	**6**	2	4
5	(Zimbabwe) **B Black**	2	**6**	**6**
3	(United States) **J Gambill**	**7^{7}**	**6**
SE	(Chile) N Massú	6^{4}	4
(Sweden) **A Vinciguerra**	**6**	**6**
(Israel) H Levy	3	4
(Spain) **F Clavet**	**6**	4	**6**
(Argentina) J I Chela	3	**6**	3
Q	(United States) **M Russell**	**6**	**6**
8	(Spain) F Vicente	2	2
6	(Chile) M Ríos	**6**	1	6^{2}
(France) **A di Pasquale**	3	**6**	**7^{7}**
(Belgium) O Rochus	**6**	3	3
Q	(United States) **G Weiner**	4	**6**	**6**
SE	(Czech Republic) M Tabara	4	4
(Spain) **J Balcells**	**6**	**6**
(Ukraine) **A Medvedev**	**6**	**6**
4	(Argentina) G Gaudio	3	3
7	(Sweden) **T Johansson**	**6**	**6**
(France) J Boutter	4	4
Q	(Italy) **M Martelli**	**6**	**7^{7}**
(Italy) D Sanguinetti	4	6^{1}
(Argentina) **M Zabaleta**	**7**	**7**
WC	(Spain) F Mantilla	5	5
Q	(Italy) A Gaudenzi	5	3
2	(Slovakia) **D Hrbatý**	**7**	**6**

Second round
(Austria) **S Koubek**	**6**	**7^{7}**
(Spain) Á Calatrava	3	6^{5}
WC	(United Kingdom) **G Rusedski**	**6**	**7^{7}**
5	(Zimbabwe) B Black	1	6^{3}
3	(United States) **J Gambill**	**6**	**6**
(Sweden) A Vinciguerra	4	4
(Spain) **F Clavet**	3	**6**	**7^{7}**
Q	(United States) M Russell	**6**	1	6^{5}
(France) A di Pasquale	2	**6**	1
Q	(United States) **G Weiner**	**6**	3	**6**
(Spain) **J Balcells**	**6**	**6**
(Ukraine) A Medvedev	2	4
7	(Sweden) **T Johansson**	**6**	**6**
Q	(Italy) M Martelli	4	3
(Argentina) M Zabaleta	**6**	3	3
2	(Slovakia) **D Hrbatý**	4	**6**	**6**

Quarterfinals
(Austria) S Koubek	2	**7**	5
WC	(United Kingdom) **G Rusedski**	**6**	5	**7**
3	(United States) J Gambill	4	4
(Spain) **F Clavet**	**6**	**6**
Q	(United States) G Weiner	3	4
(Spain) **J Balcells**	**6**	**6**
7	(Sweden) T Johansson	**7^{7}**	3	2
2	(Slovakia) **D Hrbatý**	6^{4}	**6**	**6**

Semifinals
WC	(United Kingdom) G Rusedski	3	2
(Spain) **F Clavet**	**6**	**6**
(Spain) J Balcells	6^{2}	3
2	(Slovakia) **D Hrbatý**	**7^{7}**	**6**

Final
(Spain) Francisco Clavet	4	**6**	3
2	(Slovakia) **Dominik Hrbatý**	**6**	2	**6**
