= 2003 Heineken Open – Doubles =

Doubles
- 2003 Heineken Open

Final
- Champions: (South Africa) David Adams (South Africa) Robbie Koenig
- Runners-up: (Czech Republic) Tomáš Cibulec (Czech Republic) Leoš Friedl
- Score: 7–6^{(7–5)}, 3–6, 6–3

Details
- Draw: 16
- Seeds: 4

Events
Singles	Doubles
- ATP Auckland Open

Jonas Björkman and Todd Woodbridge were the defending champions but did not compete that year.

David Adams and Robbie Koenig won in the final 7–6^{(7–5)}, 3–6, 6–3 against Tomáš Cibulec and Leoš Friedl.

== Seeds ==
Champion seeds are indicated in bold text while text in italics indicates the round in which those seeds were eliminated.

1. (United States) Donald Johnson / (United States) Jared Palmer (first round)
2. (South Africa) **David Adams** / (South Africa) **Robbie Koenig (champions)**
3. (Czech Republic) Petr Pála / (Czech Republic) Pavel Vízner (first round)
4. (United States) Jan-Michael Gambill / (United States) Graydon Oliver (first round)

== Draw ==
Key

- Q = Qualifier
- WC = Wild card
- LL = Lucky loser
- Alt = Alternate
- ITF = ITF entry
- PR = Protected ranking
- SR = Special ranking
- SE = Special exempt
- JE = Junior exempt
- JR = Junior Accelerator Programme entrant
- CO = College Accelerator Programme entrant
- NG = Next Gen Accelerator Program entrant
- w/o = Walkover
- r = Retired
- d = Defaulted

First round
1	(United States) D Johnson (United States) J Palmer	5	3
(United States) **D Bowen** (Italy) **D Sanguinetti**	**7**	**6**
(Argentina) **J Acasuso** (Chile) **F González**	**6**	**7^{8}**
WC	(New Zealand) J Olsen (New Zealand) S Rea	4	6^{6}
4	(United States) J-M Gambill (United States) G Oliver	**7^{7}**	6^{4}	6^{2}
(South Africa) **E Ferreira** (United States) **B MacPhie**	6^{5}	**7^{7}**	**7^{7}**
(Czech Republic) **T Cibulec** (Czech Republic) **L Friedl**	**6**	4	**7^{10}**
(South Africa) J Coetzee (South Africa) C Haggard	2	**6**	6^{8}
(Slovakia) D Hrbatý (Czech Republic) R Štěpánek	**6**	1	5
(Argentina) **L Arnold** (Argentina) **D Nalbandian**	4	**6**	**7**
(Brazil) **G Kuerten** (Brazil) **A Sá**	**7^{8}**	**6**
3	(Czech Republic) P Pála (Czech Republic) P Vízner	6^{6}	3
(Argentina) A Calleri (Argentina) G Coria	3	6^{8}
WC	(New Zealand) **A Hunt** (New Zealand) **M Nielsen**	**6**	**7^{10}**
(Argentina) G Etlis (Argentina) M Rodríguez	6^{2}	**6**	2
2	(South Africa) **D Adams** (South Africa) **R Koenig**	**7^{7}**	3	**6**

Quarterfinals
(United States) **D Bowen** (Italy) **D Sanguinetti**	3
(Argentina) J Acasuso (Chile) F González	3^{r}
(South Africa) E Ferreira (United States) B MacPhie	4	**6**	3
(Czech Republic) **T Cibulec** (Czech Republic) **L Friedl**	**6**	3	**6**
(Argentina) L Arnold (Argentina) D Nalbandian	3	6^{4}
(Brazil) **G Kuerten** (Brazil) **A Sá**	**6**	**7^{7}**
WC	(New Zealand) A Hunt (New Zealand) M Nielsen	4	3
2	(South Africa) **D Adams** (South Africa) **R Koenig**	**6**	**6**

Semifinals
(United States) D Bowen (Italy) D Sanguinetti	6^{4}	2
(Czech Republic) **T Cibulec** (Czech Republic) **L Friedl**	**7^{7}**	**6**
(Brazil) G Kuerten (Brazil) A Sá	**6**	1	5
2	(South Africa) **D Adams** (South Africa) **R Koenig**	4	**6**	**7**

Final
(Czech Republic) T Cibulec (Czech Republic) L Friedl	6^{5}	**6**	3
2	(South Africa) **D Adams** (South Africa) **R Koenig**	**7^{7}**	3	**6**
