= 2003 Heineken Open =

- Date: 6–12 January
- Edition: 36th
- Category: International Series
- Draw: 32S / 16D
- Prize money: $322,000
- Location: Auckland, New Zealand
- Venue: ASB Tennis Centre

Champions

Singles
- (Brazil) Gustavo Kuerten

Doubles
- (South Africa) David Adams / (South Africa) Robbie Koenig
← 2002 ·	ATP Auckland Open	· 2004 →

The 2003 Heineken Open was a men's tennis tournament played on outdoor hard courts at the ASB Tennis Centre in Auckland in New Zealand and was part of the International Series of the 2003 ATP Tour. It was the 36th edition of the tournament and was held from 6 January through 12 January 2003. Fourth-seeded Gustavo Kuerten won the singles title.

== Finals ==
=== Singles ===
(Brazil) Gustavo Kuerten defeated (Slovakia) Dominik Hrbatý 6–3, 7–5

- It was Kuerten's 1st title of the year and the 26th of his career.

=== Doubles ===
(South Africa) David Adams / (South Africa) Robbie Koenig defeated (Czech Republic) Tomáš Cibulec / (Czech Republic) Leoš Friedl 7–6^{(7–5)}, 3–6, 6–3

- It was Adams's only title of the year and the 19th of his career. It was Koenig's 1st title of the year and the 3rd of his career.
