= 2001 Heineken Open – Doubles =

Doubles
- 2001 Heineken Open

Final
- Champions: (South Africa) Marius Barnard (United States) Jim Thomas
- Runners-up: (South Africa) David Adams (Argentina) Martín García
- Score: 7–6^{(12–10)}, 6–4

Details
- Draw: 16
- Seeds: 4

Events
| Singles | Doubles |
| ← 2000 · | ATP Auckland Open | · 2002 → |

Ellis Ferreira and Rick Leach were the defending champions but did not compete that year.

Marius Barnard and Jim Thomas won in the final 7–6^{(12–10)}, 6–4 against David Adams and Martín García.

== Seeds ==
Champion seeds are indicated in bold text while text in italics indicates the round in which those seeds were eliminated.

1. (South Africa) David Adams / (Argentina) Martín García (final)
2. (Sweden) Simon Aspelin / (South Africa) Robbie Koenig (quarterfinals)
3. (South Africa) Chris Haggard / (Belgium) Tom Vanhoudt (first round)
4. (Argentina) Lucas Arnold / (Sweden) Johan Landsberg (first round)

== Draw ==
=== Key ===
- Q = Qualifier
- WC = Wild card
- LL = Lucky loser
- Alt = Alternate
- SE = Special exempt
- PR = Protected ranking
- ITF = ITF entry
- JE = Junior exempt
- w/o = Walkover
- r = Retired
- d = Defaulted
- SR = Special ranking

First round
1 | (South Africa) **D Adams** (Argentina) **M García** | 6^{2} | **7^{8}** | **6**
(United States) J-M Gambill (United States) J Stark | **7^{7}** | 6^{6} | 4
WC | (Slovakia) **D Hrbatý** (Slovakia) **K Kučera** | **6** | **6**
(United States) D Bowen (United States) J Waite | 3 | 1
3 | (South Africa) C Haggard (Belgium) T Vanhoudt | 3 | **6** | 6^{6}
Q | (South Africa) **P Rosner** (South Africa) **J Weir-Smith** | **6** | 3 | **7^{8}**
(Czech Republic) **P Pála** (Czech Republic) **P Vízner** | **7^{7}** | 6^{6} | **7^{7}**
(Czech Republic) T Cibulec (Czech Republic) L Friedl | 6^{3} | **7^{8}** | 6^{2}
(France) J Boutter (Italy) A Gaudenzi | 6^{3} | **6** | 3
(Argentina) **A Calleri** (Argentina) **F Squillari** | **7^{7}** | 4 | **6**
(South Africa) **M Barnard** (United States) **J Thomas** | **6** | **6**
4 | (Argentina) L Arnold (Sweden) J Landsberg | 4 | 4
(Japan) **T Shimada** (South Africa) **M Wakefield** | **6** | **7^{7}**
WC | (New Zealand) J Greenhalgh (New Zealand) A Hunt | 2 | 6^{0}
(Israel) E Ran (Spain) J Velasco Jr. | 4 | 4
2 | (Sweden) **S Aspelin** (South Africa) **R Koenig** | **6** | **6**

Quarterfinals
1 | (South Africa) **D Adams** (Argentina) **M García** | **7** | **6**
WC | (Slovakia) D Hrbatý (Slovakia) K Kučera | 5 | 4
Q | (South Africa) **P Rosner** (South Africa) **J Weir-Smith** | 6^{2} | **6** | **6**
(Czech Republic) P Pála (Czech Republic) P Vízner | **7^{7}** | 4 | 4
(Argentina) A Calleri (Argentina) F Squillari | 5 | 6^{6}
(South Africa) **M Barnard** (United States) **J Thomas** | **7** | **7^{8}**
(Japan) **T Shimada** (South Africa) **M Wakefield** | **6** | **6**
2 | (Sweden) S Aspelin (South Africa) R Koenig | 4 | 3

Semifinals
1 | (South Africa) **D Adams** (Argentina) **M García** | **6** | **6**
Q | (South Africa) P Rosner (South Africa) J Weir-Smith | 2 | 3
(South Africa) **M Barnard** (United States) **J Thomas** | **6** | 1 | **6**
(Japan) T Shimada (South Africa) M Wakefield | 3 | **6** | 1

Final
1 | (South Africa) D Adams (Argentina) M García | 6^{10} | 4
(South Africa) **M Barnard** (United States) **J Thomas** | **7^{12}** | **6**
