= 2004 Heineken Open – Singles =

Singles
- 2004 Heineken Open

Final
- Champion: (Slovakia) Dominik Hrbatý
- Runner-up: (Spain) Rafael Nadal
- Score: 4–6, 6–2, 7–5

Details
- Draw: 32 (4 Q / 3 WC )
- Seeds: 8

Events
Singles	Doubles
← 2003 ·	ATP Auckland Open	· 2005 →

Gustavo Kuerten was the defending champion of the singles event at the Heineken Open tennis tournament, held in Auckland, New Zealand, but lost in the semifinals to Dominik Hrbatý.

Hrbatý won in the final 4–6, 6–2, 7–5 against Rafael Nadal, on his first ATP tour level final.

== Seeds ==
A champion seed is indicated in bold text while text in italics indicates the round in which that seed was eliminated.

1. (Argentina) Guillermo Coria (second round; withdrew)
2. (Czech Republic) Jiří Novák (semifinals)
3. (Brazil) Gustavo Kuerten (semifinals)
4. (Netherlands) Sjeng Schalken (first round)
5. (United States) Vince Spadea (quarterfinals)
6. (Argentina) Gastón Gaudio (second round)
7. (Chile) Fernando González (first round)
8. (Finland) Jarkko Nieminen (first round)

== Draw ==
=== Key ===
- Q = Qualifier
- WC = Wild card
- LL = Lucky loser
- Alt = Alternate
- SE = Special exempt
- PR = Protected ranking
- ITF = ITF entry
- JE = Junior exempt
- w/o = Walkover
- r = Retired
- d = Defaulted
- SR = Special ranking

First round
1	(Argentina) **G Coria**	**7^{7}**	**6**
(Germany) N Kiefer	6^{4}	3
WC	(New Zealand) M Nielsen	3	2
(Slovakia) **D Hrbatý**	**6**	**6**
(Peru) L Horna	4	3
Q	(Germany) **P Kohlschreiber**	**6**	**6**
(Czech Republic) R Štěpánek	5	3
6	(Argentina) **G Gaudio**	**7**	**6**
3	(Brazil) **G Kuerten**	6^{7}	**7^{7}**	**7**
WC	(Spain) À Corretja	**7^{9}**	6^{3}	5
(Spain) **A Martín**	**6**	**6**
(Austria) S Koubek	4	4
Q	(Netherlands) **F Hemmes Jr.**	**6**	**6**
(Sweden) R Söderling	2	3
(United States) T Martin	3	4
5	(United States) **V Spadea**	**6**	**6**
8	(Finland) J Nieminen	1	4
(France) **F Santoro**	**6**	**6**
(France) **G Carraz**	**6**	6^{3}	**6**
(Slovakia) K Beck	4	**7^{7}**	3
WC	(New Zealand) S Rea	2	1
Q	(Croatia) **M Ančić**	**6**	**6**
(Spain) **R Nadal**	**7^{7}**	**6**
4	(Netherlands) S Schalken	6^{2}	4
7	(Chile) F González	3	4
(Netherlands) **R Sluiter**	**6**	**6**
(Spain) **D Sánchez**	**7^{7}**	**6**
(United States) J-M Gambill	6^{5}	3
Q	(Luxembourg) **G Müller**	**7**	6^{3}	**6**
(Ecuador) N Lapentti	5	**7^{7}**	1
(Belgium) X Malisse	6^{7}	**7^{7}**	3
2	(Czech Republic) **J Novák**	**7^{9}**	6^{4}	**6**

Second round
1	(Argentina) G Coria
(Slovakia) **D Hrbatý**	w/o
Q	(Germany) **P Kohlschreiber**	**7^{7}**	**6**
6	(Argentina) G Gaudio	6^{3}	1
3	(Brazil) **G Kuerten**	**6**	**6**
(Spain) A Martín	2	4
Q	(Netherlands) F Hemmes Jr.	1	2
5	(United States) **V Spadea**	**6**	**6**
(France) F Santoro	2	4
(France) **G Carraz**	**6**	**6**
Q	(Croatia) M Ančić	6^{0}	6^{6}
(Spain) **R Nadal**	**7^{7}**	**7^{8}**
(Netherlands) **R Sluiter**	**7^{7}**	**6**
(Spain) D Sánchez	6^{3}	3
Q	(Luxembourg) G Müller	6^{4}	2
2	(Czech Republic) **J Novák**	**7^{7}**	**6**

Quarterfinals
(Slovakia) **D Hrbatý**	**6**	3	**6**
Q	(Germany) P Kohlschreiber	1	**6**	3
3	(Brazil) **G Kuerten**	**6**	**7^{7}**
5	(United States) V Spadea	2	6^{4}
(France) G Carraz	1^{r}
(Spain) **R Nadal**	2
(Netherlands) R Sluiter	**6**	4	4
2	(Czech Republic) **J Novák**	4	**6**	**6**

Semifinals
(Slovakia) **D Hrbatý**	**6**	**6**
3	(Brazil) G Kuerten	3	2
(Spain) **R Nadal**	**6**	**6**
2	(Czech Republic) J Novák	1	3

Final
(Slovakia) **Dominik Hrbatý**	4	**6**	**7**
(Spain) Rafael Nadal	**6**	2	5
