= 2000 Heineken Open =

- Date: 10–15 January
- Edition: 33rd
- Category: International Series
- Draw: 32S / 16D
- Prize money: $325,000
- Surface: Hard / outdoor
- Location: Auckland, New Zealand
- Venue: ASB Tennis Centre

Champions

Singles
- (Sweden) Magnus Norman

Doubles
- (South Africa) Ellis Ferreira / (United States) Rick Leach
← 1999 ·	ATP Auckland Open	· 2001 →

The 2000 Heineken Open was a men's ATP tennis tournament held in Auckland, New Zealand. The event was part of the International Series of the 2000 ATP Tour and was played on outdoor hard courts. It was the 33rd edition of the tournament and was held from 10 January through 15 January 2000. Second-seeded Magnus Norman won the singles title.

== Finals ==
=== Singles ===
(Sweden) Magnus Norman defeated (United States) Michael Chang 3–6, 6–3, 7–5

- It was Norman's 1st title of the year and the 8th of his career.

=== Doubles ===
(South Africa) Ellis Ferreira / (United States) Rick Leach defeated (France) Olivier Delaître / (United States) Jeff Tarango 7–5, 6–4

- It was Ferreira's 1st title of the year and the 13th of his career. It was Leach's 1st title of the year and the 38th of his career.
