= Mirko Pehar =

American-Croatian tennis player

- Country (sports): United States (2002 – 2007); Croatia (1998 – 2002)
- Born: 5 August 1980 (age 45)
- Retired: 2007
- Prize money: $71,582

Singles
- Career record: 0–0
- Career titles: 0
- Highest ranking: No. 582 (April 22, 2002)

Doubles
- Career record: 2–3
- Career titles: 0
- Highest ranking: No. 122 (April 3, 2006)
- Last updated on: 2 April 2026.

Mirko Pehar (born 5 August 1980) is a retired American tennis player. Pehar has a career high ATP singles ranking of No. 582 achieved on April 22, 2002 and a career high doubles ranking of No. 122 achieved on April 3, 2006.

Pehar has won two ATP Challenger doubles titles in the 2005 season. He made his main draw debut on the ATP Tour at the 2005 Croatia Open Umag partnering Goran Dragicevic in the doubles competition.

Since his retirement as active tennis player, he became part of the coaching team of his friend Ivo Karlović.

== ATP Challenger and ITF Futures finals ==
=== Singles: 1 (0–1) ===
ATP Challenger (0–0)
ITF Futures (0–1)

Result	W–L	Date	Tournament	Tier	Surface	Opponent	Score
Loss	0–1	Apr 2001	Mushref, Kuwait	Futures	Hard (i)	(Netherlands) Rogier Wassen	1–6, 1–6

=== Doubles: 38 (11–27) ===
ATP Challenger (2–11)
ITF Futures (9–16)

Result	W–L	Date	Tournament	Tier	Surface	Partner	Opponents	Score
Loss	0–1	Aug 1998	Vilnius, Lithuania	Futures	Carpet	(South Africa) Craig Campbell	(Slovakia) Viktor Bruthans (New Zealand) James Shortall	6–2, 3–6, 5–7
Loss	0–2	Jun 1999	Turin, Italy	Futures	Clay	(South Africa) Craig Campbell	(Argentina) Guillermo Coria (Argentina) David Nalbandian	6–7, 3–6
Win	1–2	Aug 1999	Casablanca, Morocco	Futures	Clay	(Germany) Andreas Weber	(Australia) Tim Crichton (Australia) Todd Perry	6–1, 4–6, 7–6
Loss	1–3	Sep 1999	Casablanca, Morocco	Futures	Clay	(Germany) Andreas Weber	(Morocco) Mounir El Aarej (Mauritius) Kamil Patel	3–6, 5–7
Loss	1–4	Sep 2000	Santo Domingo, Dominican Republic	Futures	Clay	(United Kingdom) Justin Layne	(Ecuador) Luis Manrique (Netherlands Antilles) Jean-Julien Rojer	4–6, 6–4, 5–7
Loss	1–5	Nov 2000	Clearwater, USA	Futures	Hard	(Croatia) Lovro Zovko	(South Africa) Justin Bower (South Africa) Vaughan Snyman	w/o
Win	2–5	Apr 2001	Melun, France	Futures	Carpet (i)	(Argentina) Cristian Kordasz	(United Kingdom) Oliver Freelove (Hungary) Gergely Kisgyörgy	7–6^{(7–4)}, 5–7, 7–6^{(10–8)}
Win	3–5	Jul 2002	St. Joseph, USA	Futures	Hard	(United States) Chris Magyary	(United States) Brandon Kramer (South Africa) Nenad Toroman	6–2, 7–5
Win	4–5	Sep 2002	Claremont, USA	Futures	Hard	(United States) Chris Magyary	(United States) KC Corkery (South Africa) Willem-Petrus Meyer	7–6^{(7–4)}, 6–2
Loss	4–6	Nov 2002	Bridgetown, Barbados	Futures	Hard	(Bolivia) Javier Taborga	(Netherlands Antilles) Jean-Julien Rojer (Jamaica) Ryan Russell	4–6, 6–4, 1–6
Loss	4–7	Dec 2002	Oranjestad, Aruba	Futures	Hard	(United States) Keith From	(Czech Republic) Dušan Karol (Czech Republic) Jaroslav Pospíšil	5–7, 6–7^{(4–7)}
Loss	4–8	Dec 2002	Montego Bay, Jamaica	Futures	Hard	(United States) John Paul Fruttero	(France) Cedric Kauffmann (Paraguay) Francisco Rodríguez	2–6, 6–1, 1–6
Loss	4–9	Dec 2002	Montego Bay, Jamaica	Futures	Hard	(United States) John Paul Fruttero	(South Africa) Raven Klaasen (United States) Michael Kosta	4–6, 4–6
Loss	4–10	Apr 2003	Taizhou, China	Futures	Hard	(United States) Alex Witt	(China) Zeng Shaoxuan (China) Zhu Benqiang	6–4, 1–6, 3–6
Loss	4–11	Apr 2003	Taizhou, China	Futures	Hard	(United States) Alex Witt	(China) Zeng Shaoxuan (China) Zhu Benqiang	2–6, 3–6
Win	5–11	May 2003	Cali, Colombia	Futures	Clay	(Colombia) Michael Quintero	(Colombia) Alejandro Falla (Colombia) Carlos Salamanca	6–3, 6–4
Loss	5–12	Jun 2003	Pančevo, Serbia & Montenegro	Futures	Clay	(North Macedonia) Lazar Magdinčev	(Argentina) Federico Cardinali (Italy) Manuel Jorquera	6–7^{(3–7)}, 6–7^{(3–7)}
Loss	5–13	Jun 2003	Belgrade, Serbia & Montenegro	Futures	Clay	(Serbia and Montenegro) Aleksander Slović	(Hungary) Kornél Bardóczky (Czech Republic) Jaroslav Pospíšil	0–6, 4–6
Loss	0–1	Aug 2003	Bukhara, Uzbekistan	Challenger	Hard	(Netherlands Antilles) Jean-Julien Rojer	(Kazakhstan) Alexey Kedryuk (Uzbekistan) Vadim Kutsenko	4–6, 6–7^{(4–7)}
Win	6–13	Sep 2003	Costa Mesa, USA	Futures	Hard	(South Africa) Nenad Toroman	(United States) Travis Rettenmaier (United States) Robert Yim	7–6^{(8–6)}, 2–6, 6–3
Loss	6–14	Apr 2004	Shizuoka, Japan	Futures	Carpet	(New Zealand) Mark Nielsen	(New Zealand) Matt Prentice (New Zealand) Lee Radovanovich	7–6^{(7–5)}, 3–6, 4–6
Loss	6–15	May 2004	Vero Beach, USA	Futures	Clay	(United States) Goran Dragicevic	(United States) Scott Lipsky (United States) David Martin	4–6, 4–6
Win	7–15	Jul 2004	Buffalo, USA	Futures	Clay	(United States) Goran Dragicevic	(United States) Dave Lingman (United States) Philip Stolt	6–4, 7–6^{(7–4)}
Loss	7–16	Jul 2004	Pittsburgh, USA	Futures	Clay	(United States) Goran Dragicevic	(United States) Tres Davis (United States) Ryan Sachire	3–6, 4–6
Win	8–16	Aug 2004	Godfrey, USA	Futures	Hard	(United States) Goran Dragicevic	(Australia) Raphael Durek (Australia) Adam Feeney	3–6, 6–3, 6–4
Win	9–16	Oct 2004	Laguna Niguel, USA	Futures	Hard	(United States) Jeremy Wurtzman	(South Africa) Justin Bower (Australia) Brian Wilson	3–6, 6–4, 7–6^{(7–2)}
Loss	0–2	Apr 2005	Tallahassee, USA	Challenger	Hard	(United States) Goran Dragicevic	(Sweden) Robert Lindstedt (Austria) Alexander Peya	2–6, 5–7
Loss	0–3	Apr 2005	Bogotá, Colombia	Challenger	Clay	(United States) Goran Dragicevic	(Brazil) Marcos Daniel (Mexico) Santiago González	6–7^{(4–7)}, 3–6
Win	1–3	Jun 2005	Cuenca, Ecuador	Challenger	Clay	(United States) Goran Dragicevic	(Brazil) Marcelo Melo (Brazil) Bruno Soares	6–3, 7–6^{(7–5)}
Win	2–3	Aug 2005	Gramado, Brazil	Challenger	Hard	(United States) Goran Dragicevic	(Argentina) Brian Dabul (Mexico) Bruno Echagaray	6–3, 6–4
Loss	2–4	Oct 2005	Sacramento, USA	Challenger	Hard	(United States) John Paul Fruttero	(United States) Scott Lipsky (United States) David Martin	4–6, 4–6
Loss	2–5	Feb 2006	Florianópolis, Brazil	Challenger	Clay	(Italy) Gianluca Naso	(Argentina) Juan Pablo Brzezicki (Argentina) Cristian Villagrán	6–7^{(3–7)}, 2–6
Loss	2–6	Feb 2006	Dallas, USA	Challenger	Hard (i)	(Serbia and Montenegro) Dušan Vemić	(United States) Rajeev Ram (United States) Bobby Reynolds	3–6, 4–6
Loss	2–7	May 2006	Forest Hills, USA	Challenger	Clay	(United States) Eric Butorac	(United States) Chris Drake (United States) Cecil Mamiit	4–6, 1–6
Loss	2–8	Sep 2006	Lubbock, USA	Challenger	Hard	(United States) Goran Dragicevic	(United States) Chris Drake (United States) Scott Lipsky	6–7^{(2–7)}, 3–6
Loss	2–9	Nov 2006	Naples, USA	Challenger	Clay	(United States) Goran Dragicevic	(Uruguay) Pablo Cuevas (Argentina) Horacio Zeballos	6–7^{(5–7)}, 3–6
Loss	2–10	Feb 2007	Joplin, USA	Challenger	Hard (i)	(United States) Goran Dragicevic	(United States) Patrick Briaud (United States) Donald Young	4–6, 4–6
Loss	2–11	Apr 2007	Tallahassee, USA	Challenger	Hard	(United States) John Paul Fruttero	(South Africa) Izak van der Merwe (South Africa) Wesley Whitehouse	3–6, 4–6
