= 2000 Heineken Open – Singles =

Singles
- 2000 Heineken Open

Final
- Champion: (Sweden) Magnus Norman
- Runner-up: (United States) Michael Chang
- Score: 3–6, 6–3, 7–5

Details
- Draw: 32 (4 Q / 3 WC )
- Seeds: 8

Events
| Singles | Doubles |
| ← 1999 · | ATP Auckland Open | · 2001 → |

Second-seeded Magnus Norman defeated Michael Chang 3–6, 6–3, 7–5 in the final to win the singles competition at the 2000 Heineken Open men's tennis tournament. Tommy Haas was the defending champion. but lost in the second round to Juan Balcells

== Seeds ==
A champion seed is indicated in bold text while text in italics indicates the round in which that seed was eliminated.

1. (Germany) Tommy Haas (second round)
2. (Sweden) Magnus Norman **(champion)**
3. (Czech Republic) Jiří Novák (second round)
4. (France) Nicolas Escudé (first round)
5. (Sweden) Thomas Johansson (second round)
6. (Netherlands) Sjeng Schalken (quarterfinals)
7. (Spain) Juan Carlos Ferrero (quarterfinals)
8. (Switzerland) Marc Rosset (quarterfinals)

== Draw ==
=== Key ===
- Q = Qualifier
- WC = Wild card
- LL = Lucky loser
- Alt = Alternate
- SE = Special exempt
- PR = Protected ranking
- ITF = ITF entry
- JE = Junior exempt
- w/o = Walkover
- r = Retired
- d = Defaulted
- SR = Special ranking

First round
1 | (Germany) **T Haas** | **7** | 4 | **7**
(United States) J Tarango | 5 | **6** | 5
(Argentina) F Squillari | 5 | 5
Q | (Spain) **J Balcells** | **7** | **7**
(Spain) A Berasategui | 3 | 1
(Spain) **A Martín** | **6** | **6**
(Switzerland) R Federer | 4 | 4
7 | (Spain) **J C Ferrero** | **6** | **6**
4 | (France) N Escudé | **6** | 6^{7} | 1
Q | (United States) **M Sell** | 0 | **7^{9}** | **6**
(Zimbabwe) B Black | 5 | **6** | 6^{1}
(United States) **M Chang** | **7** | 4 | **7^{7}**
(Sweden) **M Gustafsson** | **6** | **6**
WC | (New Zealand) M Nielsen | 4 | 4
Q | (United States) G Weiner | 6^{5} | 1
5 | (Sweden) **T Johansson** | **7^{7}** | **6**
6 | (Netherlands) **S Schalken** | **6** | 4 | **6**
(Croatia) G Ivanišević | 1 | **6** | 4
SE | (Germany) M Hantschk | 2 | 2
Q | (Germany) **T Behrend** | **6** | **6**
(Armenia) S Sargsian | 5 | **6** | 5
(Argentina) **G Gaudio** | **7** | 4 | **7**
WC | (Sweden) J Björkman | 5 | 4
3 | (Czech Republic) **J Novák** | **7** | **6**
8 | (Switzerland) **M Rosset** | **6** | **6**
(Spain) F Vicente | 4 | 3
(United States) C Woodruff | 1 | 3
(Netherlands) **J van Lottum** | **6** | **6**
(United States) **J Gambill** | 4 | **6** | **6**
WC | (Australia) R Fromberg | **6** | 3 | 4
LL | (Brazil) F Costa | 2 | 5
2 | (Sweden) **M Norman** | **6** | **7**

Second round
1 | (Germany) T Haas | 4 | 5
Q | (Spain) **J Balcells** | **6** | **7**
(Spain) A Martín | **7^{7}** | 2 | 4
7 | (Spain) **J C Ferrero** | 6^{2} | **6** | **6**
Q | (United States) M Sell | **6** | 4 | 6^{1}
(United States) **M Chang** | 4 | **6** | **7^{7}**
(Sweden) **M Gustafsson** | **6** | **6**
5 | (Sweden) T Johansson | 2 | 3
6 | (Netherlands) **S Schalken** | **6** | **6**
Q | (Germany) T Behrend | 4 | 1
(Argentina) **G Gaudio** | **6** | 6^{4} | **7^{7}**
3 | (Czech Republic) J Novák | 4 | **7^{7}** | 6^{4}
8 | (Switzerland) **M Rosset** | **6** | **6**
(Netherlands) J van Lottum | 3 | 2
(United States) J Gambill | 3 | 3
2 | (Sweden) **M Norman** | **6** | **6**

Quarterfinals
Q | (Spain) **J Balcells** | 4 | **6** | **6**
7 | (Spain) J C Ferrero | **6** | 3 | 1
(United States) **M Chang** | **7** | 3 | **1**
(Sweden) M Gustafsson | 5 | **6** | 0/R
6 | (Netherlands) S Schalken | 1 | 2
(Argentina) **G Gaudio** | **6** | **6**
8 | (Switzerland) M Rosset | 2 | 2
2 | (Sweden) **M Norman** | **6** | **6**

Semifinals
Q | (Spain) J Balcells | 3 | **6** | 2
(United States) **M Chang** | **6** | 3 | **6**
(Argentina) G Gaudio | 4 | 5
2 | (Sweden) **M Norman** | **6** | **7**

Final
(United States) Michael Chang | **6** | 3 | 5
2 | (Sweden) **Magnus Norman** | 3 | **6** | **7**
