= 1999 Heineken Open – Singles =

Singles
- 1999 Heineken Open

Final
- Champion: (Netherlands) Sjeng Schalken
- Runner-up: (Germany) Tommy Haas
- Score: 6–4, 6–4

Details
- Draw: 32 (4 Q / 3 WC )
- Seeds: 8

Events
Singles	Doubles
← 1998 ·	ATP Auckland Open	· 2000 →

Sjeng Schalken defeated Tommy Haas 6–4, 6–4 to win the 1999 Heineken Open singles competition. Marcelo Ríos was the defending champion.

== Seeds ==
A champion seed is indicated in bold text while text in italics indicates the round in which that seed was eliminated.

1. (Chile) Marcelo Ríos (first round)
2. (Spain) Félix Mantilla (semifinals)
3. (South Africa) Wayne Ferreira (first round)
4. (Zimbabwe) Byron Black (first round)
5. (Germany) Tommy Haas (final)
6. (France) Fabrice Santoro (first round)
7. (United States) Vincent Spadea (first round)
8. (Slovakia) Dominik Hrbatý (quarterfinals)

== Draw ==
=== Key ===
- Q = Qualifier
- WC = Wild card
- LL = Lucky loser
- Alt = Alternate
- SE = Special exempt
- PR = Protected ranking
- ITF = ITF entry
- JE = Junior exempt
- w/o = Walkover
- r = Retired
- d = Defaulted
- SR = Special ranking

First round
1	(Chile) M Ríos	**7**	0	R
(Romania) **A Pavel**	5	**2**
(Spain) **F Vicente**	**6**	4	**6**
(United States) J Tarango	2	**6**	4
Q	(Argentina) G Cañas	**6**	5	3
(Czech Republic) **D Vacek**	4	**7**	**6**
(Netherlands) **S Schalken**	**7^{8}**	**6**
7	(United States) V Spadea	6^{6}	4
3	(South Africa) W Ferreira	1	4
WC	(New Zealand) **B Steven**	**6**	**6**
(Russia) **M Safin**	**6**	**6**
(Italy) G Pozzi	3	2
(Argentina) **M Zabaleta**	3	**6**	**6**
(Italy) D Sanguinetti	**6**	3	2
(Sweden) **M Norman**	4	**7^{9}**	**3**
6	(France) F Santoro	**6**	6^{7}	0/R
5	(Germany) **T Haas**	**6**	**7^{7}**
Q	(Brazil) A Sá	2	6^{5}
(Costa Rica) **J Marín**	**6**	**6**
(Spain) C Costa	3	4
Q	(Spain) **A Martín**	**6**	**6**
(Australia) A Ilie	3	4
(France) **G Raoux**	**6**	**6**
4	(Zimbabwe) B Black	3	3
8	(Slovakia) **D Hrbatý**	**6**	**6**
(Argentina) F Squillari	2	4
(Brazil) **F Meligeni**	**6**	**7**
WC	(New Zealand) A Hunt	1	5
(Romania) **A Voinea**	**7^{7}**	**6**
WC	(United States) J Courier	6^{5}	1
Q	(Italy) L Tieleman	6^{10}	2
2	(Spain) **F Mantilla**	**7^{12}**	**6**

Second round
(Romania) **A Pavel**	**6**	**6**
(Spain) F Vicente	3	4
(Czech Republic) D Vacek	4	4
(Netherlands) **S Schalken**	**6**	**6**
WC	(New Zealand) **B Steven**	**7**	**6**
(Russia) M Safin	5	2
(Argentina) **M Zabaleta**	5	**6**	**6**
(Sweden) M Norman	**7**	3	3
5	(Germany) **T Haas**	**6**	**6**
(Costa Rica) J Marín	3	4
Q	(Spain) A Martín	6^{5}	**7**	6^{1}
(France) **G Raoux**	**7^{7}**	5	**7^{7}**
8	(Slovakia) **D Hrbatý**	**7^{7}**	**7**
(Brazil) F Meligeni	6^{2}	5
(Romania) A Voinea	**6**	1	4
2	(Spain) **F Mantilla**	1	**6**	**6**

Quarterfinals
(Romania) A Pavel	3	2
(Netherlands) **S Schalken**	**6**	**6**
WC	(New Zealand) **B Steven**	**6**	**6**
(Argentina) M Zabaleta	0	4
5	(Germany) **T Haas**	**7^{7}**	**7^{7}**
(France) G Raoux	6^{4}	6^{2}
8	(Slovakia) D Hrbatý	**6**	5	3
2	(Spain) **F Mantilla**	2	**7**	**6**

Semifinals
(Netherlands) **S Schalken**	**6**	**6**
WC	(New Zealand) B Steven	4	4
5	(Germany) **T Haas**	4	**6**	**6**
2	(Spain) F Mantilla	**6**	3	3

Final
(Netherlands) **Sjeng Schalken**	**6**	**6**
5	(Germany) Tommy Haas	4	4
