= Rob Cheyne =

New Zealand tennis player

- Full name: Robert Cheyne
- Country (sports): New Zealand
- Born: 20 October 1976 (age 48)

Singles
- Career record: 1–1 (Davis Cup)
- Highest ranking: No. 790 (28 May 2001)

Doubles
- Highest ranking: No. 617 (21 July 2003)

Robert Cheyne (born 20 October 1976) is a New Zealand former professional tennis player.

Cheyne grew up in Tītahi Bay and was a collegiate player for Fresno State, before competing professionally. He won two ITF Futures doubles titles, both with Mark Nielsen. In 2003 he represented the New Zealand Davis Cup team in ties against Pakistan and India. Soon after he left the tour to become an assistant coach for Baylor University and helped guide the team to an NCAA championship in 2004. He previously worked in New Zealand as a chiropractor for Cheyne & Sissons Chiropractic and is now back in the United States, again working as a chiropractor, according to his Linkedln.

== ITF Futures finals ==
=== Doubles: 3 (2–1) ===
Result	W–L	Date	Tournament	Surface	Partner	Opponents	Score
Loss	0–1	Aug 2002	Austria F3, Kramsach	Clay	(Belgium) Stefan Wauters	(Croatia) Ivan Cinkuš (Croatia) Krešimir Ritz	4–6, 6–7^{(4)}
Win	1–1	Apr 2003	Japan F1, Kōfu	Carpet	(New Zealand) Mark Nielsen	(Japan) Katsushi Fukuda (Sweden) Michael Ryderstedt	4–6, 6–4, 6–3
Win	2–1	Apr 2003	Japan F2, Tokyo	Hard	(New Zealand) Mark Nielsen	(Japan) Joji Miyao (Japan) Yasuo Miyazaki	6–0, 6–4

== See also ==
- List of New Zealand Davis Cup team representatives
