= 2000 Heineken Open – Doubles =

Doubles
- 2000 Heineken Open

Final
- Champions: (South Africa) Ellis Ferreira (United States) Rick Leach
- Runners-up: (France) Olivier Delaître (United States) Jeff Tarango
- Score: 7–5, 6–4

Details
- Draw: 16
- Seeds: 4

Events
Singles	Doubles
← 1999 ·	ATP Auckland Open	· 2001 →

Jeff Tarango and Daniel Vacek were the defending champions, but Vacek did not participate this year. Tarango partnered Olivier Delaître, losing in the final.

Ellis Ferreira and Rick Leach won the title, defeating Delaître and Tarango 7–5, 6–4 in the final.

== Seeds ==
1. (South Africa) Ellis Ferreira / (United States) Rick Leach (champions)
2. (France) Olivier Delaître / (United States) Jeff Tarango (final)
3. (Czech Republic) Jiří Novák / (Czech Republic) David Rikl (semifinals)
4. (United States) Jan-Michael Gambill / (United States) Scott Humphries (first round)

== Draw ==
=== Key ===
- Q = Qualifier
- WC = Wild card
- LL = Lucky loser
- Alt = Alternate
- SE = Special exempt
- PR = Protected ranking
- ITF = ITF entry
- JE = Junior exempt
- w/o = Walkover
- r = Retired
- d = Defaulted
- SR = Special ranking

=== Draw ===
First round
1	(South Africa) E Ferreira (United States) R Leach	6	6
(South Africa) L Bale (United States) A Peterson	4	3
WC	(United States) P Galbraith (United States) C Woodruff	6	6
(Sweden) J Björkman (New Zealand) J Greenhalgh	4	1
3	(Czech Republic) J Novák (Czech Republic) D Rikl	6	4	6
(Argentina) M García (Argentina) M Puerta	2	6	3
(Spain) A Martín (Belgium) T Vanhoudt	4	6	6^{0}
(United States) D Bowen (United States) B Coupe	6	3	7^{7}
(Czech Republic) P Pála (Czech Republic) P Vízner	6^{5}	6	6
(Argentina) D del Río (United States) J Waite	7^{7}	3	4
(South Africa) M Barnard (South Africa) C Haggard	6	6
4	(United States) J-M Gambill (United States) S Humphries	4	3
Q	(The Bahamas) M Merklein (United States) F Montana	6^{3}	6	5
WC	(New Zealand) J Shortall (Brazil) C Testa	7^{7}	4	7
WC	(New Zealand) A Hunt (Netherlands) S Schalken	3	6^{4}
2	(France) O Delaître (United States) J Tarango	6	7^{7}

Quarterfinals
1	(South Africa) E Ferreira (United States) R Leach	6	6
WC	(United States) P Galbraith (United States) C Woodruff	3	4
3	(Czech Republic) J Novák (Czech Republic) D Rikl	7^{7}
(United States) D Bowen (United States) B Coupe	6^{1}	r
(Czech Republic) P Pála (Czech Republic) P Vízner	3	6	7^{7}
(South Africa) M Barnard (South Africa) C Haggard	6	4	6^{5}
WC	(New Zealand) J Shortall (Brazil) C Testa	2	4
2	(France) O Delaître (United States) J Tarango	6	6

Semifinals
1	(South Africa) E Ferreira (United States) R Leach	6	6
3	(Czech Republic) J Novák (Czech Republic) D Rikl	2	4
(Czech Republic) P Pála (Czech Republic) P Vízner	3	4
2	(France) O Delaître (United States) J Tarango	6	6

Final
1	(South Africa) E Ferreira (United States) R Leach	7	6
2	(France) O Delaître (United States) J Tarango	5	4
