= 2002 Heineken Open – Singles =

Singles
- 2002 Heineken Open

Final
- Champion: (United Kingdom) Greg Rusedski
- Runner-up: (France) Jérôme Golmard
- Score: 6–7^{(0–7)}, 6–4, 7–5

Details
- Draw: 32 (4 Q / 3 WC )
- Seeds: 8

Events
Singles	Doubles
- ATP Auckland Open

Dominik Hrbatý was the defending champion of the singles event at the Heineken Open tennis tournament, held in Auckland, New Zealand, but lost in the first round to Gilles Elseneer.

Sixth-seeded Greg Rusedski won in the final 6–7^{(0–7)}, 6–4, 7–5 against Unseeded Jérôme Golmard.

== Seeds ==
A champion seed is indicated in bold text while text in italics indicates the round in which that seed was eliminated.

1. (Russia) Marat Safin (second round)
2. (Croatia) Goran Ivanišević (quarterfinals)
3. (United States) Jan-Michael Gambill (first round)
4. (Netherlands) Sjeng Schalken (second round)
5. (Czech Republic) Jiří Novák (semifinals)
6. (United Kingdom) **Greg Rusedski (champion)**
7. (Sweden) Andreas Vinciguerra (first round)
8. (Slovakia) Dominik Hrbatý (first round)

== Draw ==
Key

- Q = Qualifier
- WC = Wild card
- LL = Lucky loser
- Alt = Alternate
- ITF = ITF entry
- PR = Protected ranking
- SR = Special ranking
- SE = Special exempt
- JE = Junior exempt
- JR = Junior Accelerator Programme entrant
- CO = College Accelerator Programme entrant
- NG = Next Gen Accelerator Program entrant
- w/o = Walkover
- r = Retired
- d = Defaulted

First round
1	(Russia) **M Safin**	2	**6**	**6**
WC	(United States) M Chang	**6**	3	4
(Argentina) G Gaudio	6^{2}	1
(Sweden) **J Björkman**	**7^{7}**	**6**
(France) **J Golmard**	**6**	**6**
WC	(New Zealand) D Willman	4	1
Q	(Belgium) **G Elseneer**	3	**6**	**6**
8	(Slovakia) D Hrbatý	**6**	1	2
3	(United States) J-M Gambill	0	6^{3}
(Spain) **F Clavet**	**6**	**7^{7}**
Q	(Germany) B Phau	4	**6**	3
(Argentina) **D Nalbandian**	**6**	4	**6**
(Switzerland) **M Kratochvil**	**6**	**6**
Q	(United States) R Ginepri	3	2
WC	(New Zealand) **M Nielsen**	**7^{7}**	**6**
7	(Sweden) A Vinciguerra	6^{5}	4
5	(Czech Republic) **J Novák**	**7**	**6**
(Italy) A Gaudenzi	5	3
(Argentina) F Squillari	3	2
(Spain) **F Vicente**	**6**	**6**
(Austria) S Koubek	6^{5}	2
(Spain) **F Mantilla**	**7^{7}**	**6**
(Spain) G Blanco	2	**6**	3
4	(Netherlands) **S Schalken**	**6**	3	**6**
6	(United Kingdom) **G Rusedski**	**6**	3	**6**
(Argentina) M Zabaleta	4	**6**	1
Q	(Brazil) A Sá	5	2
(Czech Republic) **M Tabara**	**7**	**6**
(Spain) A Montañés	**6**	6^{2}	1
(Russia) **M Youzhny**	4	**7^{7}**	**6**
(Finland) J Nieminen	6^{5}	3
2	(Croatia) **G Ivanišević**	**7^{7}**	**6**

Second round
1	(Russia) M Safin	3	**6**	3
(Sweden) **J Björkman**	**6**	4	**6**
(France) **J Golmard**	**7^{7}**	**6**
Q	(Belgium) G Elseneer	6^{5}	2
(Spain) F Clavet	3	3
(Argentina) **D Nalbandian**	**6**	**6**
(Switzerland) **M Kratochvil**	**6**	**6**
WC	(New Zealand) M Nielsen	3	2
5	(Czech Republic) **J Novák**	**6**	**6**
(Spain) F Vicente	3	3
(Spain) **F Mantilla**	**6**	**6**
4	(Netherlands) S Schalken	4	4
6	(United Kingdom) **G Rusedski**	5	**7**	**6**
(Czech Republic) M Tabara	**7**	5	4
(Russia) M Youzhny	**6**	3	3
2	(Croatia) **G Ivanišević**	4	**6**	**6**

Quarterfinals
(Sweden) J Björkman	3	4
(France) **J Golmard**	**6**	**6**
(Argentina) D Nalbandian	**6**	1	5
(Switzerland) **M Kratochvil**	2	**6**	**7**
5	(Czech Republic) **J Novák**	**6**	**6**
(Spain) F Mantilla	1	1
6	(United Kingdom) **G Rusedski**	**6**	0	**6**
2	(Croatia) G Ivanišević	2	**6**	3

Semifinals
(France) **J Golmard**	**6**	**6**
(Switzerland) M Kratochvil	2	2
5	(Czech Republic) J Novák	**7^{8}**	4	6^{2}
6	(United Kingdom) **G Rusedski**	6^{6}	**6**	**7^{7}**

Final
(France) Jérôme Golmard	**7^{7}**	4	5
6	(United Kingdom) **Greg Rusedski**	6^{0}	**6**	**7**
