= Chris Drake (tennis) =

American tennis player

- Full name: Chris Drake
- Country (sports): United States
- Born: January 5, 1981 (age 44)
- Prize money: $36,244

Singles
- Highest ranking: No. 953 (July 25, 2005)

Doubles
- Career record: 0–4
- Career titles: 0
- Highest ranking: No. 92 (October 2, 2006)

Chris Drake (born January 5, 1981) is a former professional tennis player from the United States.

== Biography ==
Originally from Boston, he is the son of former professional tennis player Bill Drake. His father was also a coach for highly ranked players including Tim Mayotte, Bud Schultz and Barbara Potter. It was at the age of 13 he began to concentrate on tennis, after previously also playing little-league baseball and soccer.

Drake played collegiate tennis at Brown University Bears while studying for a degree in modern American history. In 2001 he and teammate Ben Brier played the Bryan brothers in the Hall of Fame Tennis Championships in Newport, an ATP Tour tournament. By the time he graduated from Brown University in 2003 he had amassed 104 singles and 90 doubles wins. A two-time Bears captain, he led the team to its first-ever Ivy League Championship in 2002. He won the ITA Rafael Osuna Sportsmanship Award in 2003 and was twice named in the All-Ivy teams.

On the professional tour, Drake specialised in doubles and made it to 92 in the world. He made another appearance at Newport in 2006 and also played in the main draws of ATP Tour tournaments in Basel and Delray Beach. As a doubles player on the Challenger circuit he won a total of six tournaments.

From 2007 to 2010, he was the men's assistant coach at Northwestern University.

From 2010 to 2019, he was the head coach of the men's tennis team at Dartmouth College.

Since 2019, he has been the head coach of the men’s tennis team at Yale University.

== Challenger titles ==
=== Doubles: (6) ===
No.	Year	Tournament	Surface	Partner	Opponents	Score
1.	2005	Luxembourg	Hard	(United States) Eric Butorac	(Sweden) Robert Lindstedt (Netherlands) Rogier Wassen	4–6, 6–3, 6–4
2.	2006	St. Brieuc, France	Clay	(United States) Eric Butorac	(Switzerland) Michael Lammer (France) Stéphane Robert	6–4, 6–4
3.	2006	Bogota, Colombia	Clay	(United States) Eric Butorac	(Paraguay) Ramón Delgado (Brazil) André Sá	W/O
4.	2006	Forest Hills, U.S.A.	Clay	(United States) Cecil Mamiit	(United States) Eric Butorac (United States) Mirko Pehar	6–4, 6–1
5.	2006	Lubbock, U.S.A.	Hard	(United States) Scott Lipsky	(United States) Goran Dragicevic (United States) Mirko Pehar	7–6^{(7–2)}, 6–3
6.	2007	Winnetka, U.S.A.	Hard	(United States) Patrick Briaud	(United States) Nicholas Monroe (South Africa) Izak van der Merwe	7–6^{(7–5)}, 6–4
