= 2004 Heineken Open =

Tennis tournament

- Date: 12–18 January
- Edition: 37th
- Category: International Series
- Draw: 32S / 16D
- Prize money: $379,000
- Surface: Hard / outdoor
- Location: Auckland, New Zealand
- Venue: ASB Tennis Centre

Champions

Singles
- (Slovakia) Dominik Hrbatý

Doubles
- (India) Mahesh Bhupathi / (France) Fabrice Santoro
← 2003 ·	ATP Auckland Open	· 2005 →

The 2004 Heineken Open was a tennis tournament played on outdoor hard courts at the ASB Tennis Centre in Auckland in New Zealand and was part of the International Series of the 2004 ATP Tour. The tournament ran from 12 January through 18 January 2004. Unseeded Dominik Hrbatý won the singles title.

== Finals ==
=== Singles ===
(Slovakia) Dominik Hrbatý defeated (Spain) Rafael Nadal 4–6, 6–2, 7–5

- It was Hrbatý's 2nd title of the year and the 7th of his career. It was also Nadal's 1st ATP Tour final.

=== Doubles ===
(India) Mahesh Bhupathi / (France) Fabrice Santoro defeated (Czech Republic) Jiří Novák / (Czech Republic) Radek Štěpánek 4–6, 7–5, 6–3

- It was Bhupathi's 1st title of the year and the 32nd of his career. It was Santoro's 1st title of the year and the 16th of his career.
