= Matt Simpson (tennis) =

New Zealand tennis player

- Full name: Matthew Simpson
- Country (sports): New Zealand
- Born: 10 August 1984 (age 42)
- Plays: Right-handed
- Prize money: $19,880

Singles
- Career record: 0–1 (Davis Cup)
- Highest ranking: No. 901 (23 Jun 2008)

Doubles
- Highest ranking: No. 754 (21 Apr 2008)

Matthew Simpson (born 10 August 1984) is a New Zealand former professional tennis player.

Simpson, a Saint Kentigern College product, is the son of tennis player Jeff Simpson. His uncle Russell Simpson also played on the international circuit.

In 2007 he made his Davis Cup debut for a tie against the Philippines in Auckland, where he was beaten in a dead rubber reverse singles match by Patrick John Tierro.

== ITF Futures finals ==
=== Doubles: 7 (1–6) ===
Result	W–L	Date	Tournament	Surface	Partner	Opponents	Score
Loss	0–1	May 2007	Bulgaria F1, Sofia	Clay	(Germany) Pirmin Haenle	(Sweden) Carl Bergman (Sweden) Daniel Kumlin	4–6, 7–6^{(4)}, 3–6
Win	1–1	Feb 2008	Thailand F1, Nonthaburi	Hard	(New Zealand) Rubin Statham	(Japan) Tatsuma Ito (Japan) Hiroki Kondo	6–4, 6–1
Loss	1–2	Jun 2009	Tunisia F1, Hammamet	Clay	(Australia) Joshua Crowe	(Italy) Valerio Carrese (Italy) Matteo Viola	6–2, 2–6, [9–11]
Loss	1–3	Oct 2009	Thailand F5, Nakhon Ratchasima	Hard	(New Zealand) William Ward	(Finland) Harri Heliövaara (Czech Republic) Roman Jebavý	2–6, 2–6
Loss	1–4	Nov 2009	Vietnam F1, Bình Dương	Hard	(New Zealand) William Ward	(Thailand) Kirati Siributwong (New Zealand) Rubin Statham	4–6, 0–6
Loss	1–5	Sep 2012	Italy F25, Trieste	Clay	(Germany) Pirmin Haenle	(Italy) Enrico Fioravante (Italy) Matteo Volante	4–6, 1–6
Loss	1–6	Sep 2012	Germany F17, Hambach	Carpet	(Germany) Pirmin Haenle	(Serbia) Nikola Ćaćić (Slovakia) Adrian Sikora	2–6, 3–6

== See also ==
- List of New Zealand Davis Cup team representatives
