= Lee Radovanovich =

New Zealand tennis player (born 1982)

- Country (sports): New Zealand
- Born: 19 April 1982 (age 43)
- Plays: Right-handed
- Prize money: $11,579

Singles
- Highest ranking: No. 776 (7 May 2001)

Doubles
- Career record: 0–1
- Highest ranking: No. 406 (30 July 2001)

Lee Radovanovich (born 19 April 1982) is a New Zealand former tennis player.

Radovanovich was a New Zealand under–18s national singles champion and made the boys' singles quarter-finals of the 2000 Australian Open, falling to Tommy Robredo His professional career, which was mainly restricted to the ITF circuit, included two editions of the Hamilton Challenger and multiple appearances in Auckland Open qualifying. In 2004, Radovanovich represented the New Zealand Davis Cup team in a doubles rubber against Indonesia, teamed up with Mark Nielsen. He was the New Zealand Residential singles champion in 2004–05.

== ITF Futures titles ==
=== Doubles: (2) ===
No.	Date	Tournament	Surface	Partner	Opponents	Score
1.	Jun 2001	Korea Rep. F2, Seoul	Clay	(Thailand) Danai Udomchoke	(South Korea) Kim Dong-hyun (South Korea) Lee Chang-hoon	6–2, 6–2
2.	Apr 2004	Japan F2, Shizuoka	Carpet	(New Zealand) Matt Prentice	(New Zealand) Mark Nielsen (United States) Mirko Pehar	6–7^{(5)}, 6–3, 6–4

== See also ==
- List of New Zealand Davis Cup team representatives
