= Matt Prentice =

New Zealand tennis player

- Full name: Matthew Prentice
- Country (sports): New Zealand
- Born: 23 September 1980 (age 46)
- Plays: Right-handed

Singles
- Career record: 0–2 (ATP Tour & Davis Cup)
- Highest ranking: No. 1408 (10 May 2004)

Doubles
- Career record: 1–2 (ATP Tour & Davis Cup)
- Highest ranking: No. 623 (7 March 2005)

Matthew Prentice (born 23 September 1980) is a New Zealand former professional tennis player.

A native of Wellington, Prentice played collegiate tennis in the United States for Oklahoma State University.

Prentice made an ATP Tour main draw appearance in doubles at the 2004 Heineken Open and won two ITF Futures doubles titles during his career. In 2004 and 2005 he was a playing member of the New Zealand Davis Cup team.

== ITF Futures titles ==
=== Doubles: (2) ===
No.	Date	Tournament	Surface	Partner	Opponents	Score
1.	Apr 2004	Japan F2, Shizuoka	Carpet	(New Zealand) Lee Radovanovich	(New Zealand) Mark Nielsen (United States) Mirko Pehar	6–7^{(5)}, 6–3, 6–4
2.	Feb 2005	New Zealand F2, North Shore	Hard	(New Zealand) Mark Nielsen	(Australia) Benjamin Stapp (Australia) Clinton Thomson	6–2, 6–7^{(5)}, 7–5

== See also ==
- List of New Zealand Davis Cup team representatives
