= 1999 Heineken Open – Doubles =

Doubles
- 1999 Heineken Open

Final
- Champions: (United States) Jeff Tarango (Czech Republic) Daniel Vacek
- Runners-up: (Czech Republic) Jiří Novák (Czech Republic) David Rikl
- Score: 7–5, 7–5

Details
- Draw: 16
- Seeds: 4

Events
Singles	Doubles
← 1998 ·	ATP Auckland Open	· 2000 →

Patrick Galbraith and Brett Steven were the defending champions, but Galbraith did not participate this year. Steven partnered James Greenhalgh, losing in the quarterfinals.

Jeff Tarango and Daniel Vacek won the title, defeating Jiří Novák and David Rikl 7–5, 7–5 in the final.

== Seeds ==
1. (South Africa) Ellis Ferreira / (United States) Rick Leach (first round)
2. (Czech Republic) Jiří Novák / (Czech Republic) David Rikl (final)
3. (United States) Jeff Tarango / (Czech Republic) Daniel Vacek (champions)
4. (Netherlands) Menno Oosting / (Czech Republic) Pavel Vízner (first round)

== Draw ==
=== Key ===
- Q = Qualifier
- WC = Wild card
- LL = Lucky loser
- Alt = Alternate
- ITF = ITF entry
- PR = Protected ranking
- SR = Special ranking
- SE = Special exempt
- JE = Junior exempt
- JR = Junior Accelerator Programme entrant
- CO = College Accelerator Programme entrant
- NG = Next Gen Accelerator Program entrant
- w/o = Walkover
- r = Retired
- d = Defaulted

=== Draw ===
First round
1	(South Africa) E Ferreira (United States) R Leach	2	6
WC	(New Zealand) J Greenhalgh (New Zealand) B Steven	6	7
(South Africa) M Barnard (South Africa) P Rosner	4	4
Q	(United States) G Grant (United States) TJ Middleton	6	6
3	(United States) J Tarango (Czech Republic) D Vacek	6	6	7
LL	(Netherlands) S Schalken (Italy) L Tieleman	7	1	6
(United States) E Taino (United States) J Waite	7	6	7
(United States) B Coupe (The Bahamas) M Merklein	6	7	6
(Italy) M Bertolini (United States) D Bowen	6	7
(Argentina) D del Río (Brazil) F Meligeni	3	5
(South Africa) L Bale (South Africa) B Haygarth	7	6
4	(Netherlands) M Oosting (Czech Republic) P Vízner	6	1
WC	(Sweden) M Norman (Romania) A Pavel	5	6	6
WC	(Spain) F Mantilla (Russia) M Safin	7	3	7
(Germany) T Haas (United States) V Spadea	4	3
2	(Czech Republic) J Novák (Czech Republic) D Rikl	6	6

Quarterfinals
WC	(New Zealand) J Greenhalgh (New Zealand) B Steven	5	4
Q	(United States) G Grant (United States) TJ Middleton	7	6
3	(United States) J Tarango (Czech Republic) D Vacek	7	7
(United States) E Taino (United States) J Waite	5	5
(Italy) M Bertolini (United States) D Bowen	7	6
(South Africa) L Bale (South Africa) B Haygarth	6	3
WC	(Spain) F Mantilla (Russia) M Safin	4	2
2	(Czech Republic) J Novák (Czech Republic) D Rikl	6	6

Semifinals
Q	(United States) G Grant (United States) TJ Middleton	3	6	3
3	(United States) J Tarango (Czech Republic) D Vacek	6	3	6
(Italy) M Bertolini (United States) D Bowen	4	5
2	(Czech Republic) J Novák (Czech Republic) D Rikl	6	7

Final
3	(United States) J Tarango (Czech Republic) D Vacek	7	7
2	(Czech Republic) J Novák (Czech Republic) D Rikl	5	5
