= Athletic DNA =

American sports apparel company

- Type: LLC
- Industry: Apparel
- Founded: 2007
- Headquarters: Seattle, Washington, U.S.
- Area served: Worldwide
- Products: Sportswear
- Website: www.athleticdna.com

Athletic DNA (ADNA) is an American sports apparel company specifically designing for tennis players. Founded in Seattle in 2007, ADNA began by training young tennis athletes, which evolved into sponsoring Select Junior Tennis players, and then expanded to manufacturing clothing for youth and adult tennis players. ADNA has since spread to professional tennis, and currently sponsors players on the ATP Tour & WTA Tour.

== Origins ==
Athletic DNA is run by former University of Illinois tennis player Mike Calkins, New Zealand Davis Cup representative; former University of Idaho tennis player Dan Willman; and Karl Wiersholm, father of nationally ranked junior tennis player Henrik Wiersholm. The company began in Seattle when founders Calkins and Willman partnered to form an academy for junior tennis players. The academy was successful, producing four No. 1 players in five years. Wiersholm then approached Willman and Calkins about branding what they had done with their junior tennis players. Weirsholm noticed that in the general population of tennis players their work ethic and character traits were changing while at his academy positive work ethics and character traits seemed to be essentially part of their DNA. This is what inspired the name Athletic DNA. With a noticeable lack of apparel targeted towards youth, ADNA began designing and manufacturing apparel for juniors and sponsoring the top young players in the sport.

ADNA manufactures clothing for juniors and adults, and introduced a new line of tennis apparel for women in January, 2012.

=== ADNA Select Athletes ===
Since most people involved in the company have an extensive tennis background, either through coaching or playing, ADNA heavily invests in the development of their sponsored players. Junior tennis players in the top 500 of rankings qualify for sponsorship and clothing discounts through the company’s Select Program, which is open to the public for application. The ADNA Select Program currently includes over 200 junior tennis players.

== Style ==
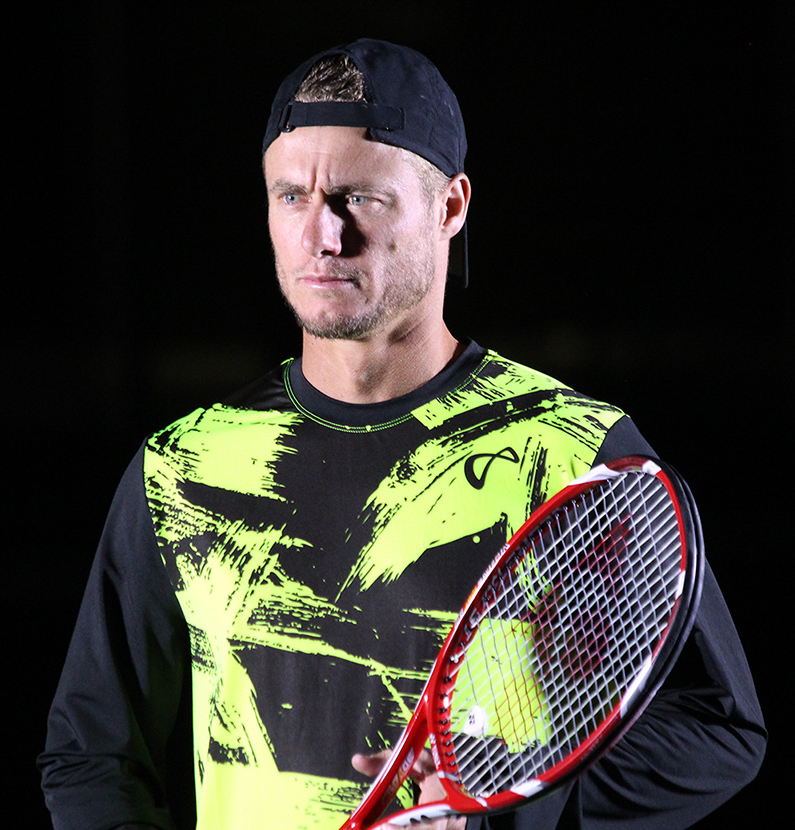
Lleyton Hewitt

ADNA produces its clothing specifically for high-performance athletes. Their colors initially heavily leaned towards red, black and white. However, in recent line releases, their tops, bottoms, Hoodies and warm-ups expanded to a variety of designs and colors, and feature the recognizable ADNA “double helix” logo. The clothing is typically less traditional, abandoning the “country club” look, with bright colors and bold designs, and is geared toward comfort and performance as much as portraying attitude.

== Sponsored Players and Coaches ==
In addition to the over 500 juniors sponsored by ADNA, the company’s apparel is also seen on the ATP tour. A list of current and former ATP tennis players and coaches who are, or have been, sponsored by ADNA include:

Current & Affiliated Pros: Lleyton Hewitt, Brian Baker, Alex Bogomolov Jr., James Duckworth, Lauren Embree, Evan King, Daniel Kosakowski, Grace Min, Dennis Nevolo, Rajeev Ram, Tennys Sandgren, Samuel Groth, Danielle Lao, Daniel Nguyen, Jesse Witten, Derek Huang

Former Pros: Ryler DeHeart, Amer Delić, Peter Luczak, Robert Kendrick, Alun Jones, Phillip Simmonds

Current Coaches: Nick Fustar, Tim Mayotte, Brad Stine, Peter Smith, Brian Wilson

In 2013, ADNA sponsored the United States Tennis Association Collegiate Team for the first time. It included Jarmere Jenkins, Dennis Novikov, Nicole Gibbs, & Lauren Embree among others.
