= Luis Fernando Manrique =

Ecuadorian tennis player (born 1981)

- Country (sports): Ecuador
- Born: 26 August 1981 (age 44); Guayaquil, Ecuador
- Height: 6 ft 1 in (185 cm)
- Plays: Right-handed
- Prize money: $12,898

Singles
- Highest ranking: No. 1281 (7 May 2007)

Doubles
- Career record: 0–2
- Highest ranking: No. 447 (8 Jan 2007)

Luis Fernando Manrique (born 26 August 1981) is an Ecuadorian former professional tennis player.

Born in Guayaquil, Manrique grew up in Key Biscayne, Florida and played collegiate tennis for the University of Miami between 2002 and 2005.

After graduating he spent two years on the professional tour and was most successful in doubles. He twice featured at the Miami Open (Masters) doubles main draw, including in 2006 when he partnered with Guillermo Coria.

Manrique now works as a real estate broker in Miami and was previously a touring coach of Jean-Julien Rojer.

== ITF Futures titles ==
=== Doubles: (1) ===
No.	Date	Tournament	Surface	Partner	Opponents	Score
1.	Sep 2000	Dominican Republic F1, Santo Domingo	Clay	(Netherlands Antilles) Jean-Julien Rojer	(United Kingdom) Justin Layne (United States) Mirko Pehar	6–4, 4–6, 7–5
