= Goran Dragicevic =

American tennis player

- Country (sports): United States
- Born: December 13, 1983 (age 41)
- Plays: Right-handed
- Prize money: $37,360

Singles
- Career record: 0–0
- Highest ranking: No. 653 (August 16, 2004)

Doubles
- Career record: 2–4
- Highest ranking: No. 103 (April 3, 2006)

Goran Dragicevic (born December 13, 1983) is an American former professional tennis player.

== Early life ==
Dragicevic, a native of Bosnia, moved to the United States as a late teenager. He came to the United States via Germany, where he had lived as a refugee for eight years, training at the Niki Pilic Tennis Academy in Oberschleißheim. His family had connections to New Port Richey through an uncle and settled in Florida.

== Tennis career ==
Dragicevic competed on the professional tour mostly as a doubles specialist, with his singles appearances limited to the satellite circuit, although he did feature in qualifiers at ATP Tour events in Delray Beach and Beijing in 2005. His best doubles ranking was 103 in the world and he reached nine ATP Challenger finals, winning three titles. On the ATP Tour he was a doubles quarter-finalist at Umag in 2005 and Memphis in 2006.

== Challenger titles ==
=== Doubles: (3) ===
Result	No.	Date	Tournament	Surface	Partner	Opponents	Score
Win	1.	Jun 2005	Cuenca, Ecuador	Clay	(United States) Mirko Pehar	(Brazil) Marcelo Melo (Brazil) Bruno Soares	6–3, 7–6^{(7–5)}
Win	2.	Aug 2005	Gramado, Brazil	Hard	(United States) Mirko Pehar	(Argentina) Brian Dabul (Mexico) Bruno Echagaray	6–3, 6–4
Win	3.	Oct 2005	Carson, U.S.	Hard	(United States) Jan-Michael Gambill	(United States) Cody Conley (United States) Ryan Newport	6–4, 6–3
