= Daniel Willman =

New Zealand tennis player (born 1975)

- Country (sports): New Zealand
- Born: 18 March 1975 (age 51)
- Prize money: $29,109

Singles
- Career record: 0–1
- Highest ranking: No. 285 (5 Aug 2002)

Grand Slam singles results
- Australian Open: Q1 (2003)

Doubles
- Career record: 0–1
- Highest ranking: No. 569 (29 Jul 2002)

Daniel Willman (born 18 March 1975) is a New Zealand former professional tennis player.

Willman played collegiate tennis for the University of Idaho from 1995 to 1998.

On the professional tour, Willman reached a best singles world ranking of 285. He received a wildcard into the main draw of the 2002 Heineken Open and featured in the qualifying draw for the 2003 Australian Open.

Willman competed for the New Zealand Davis Cup team in two ties in 2002, which included a doubles rubber against India's Mahesh Bhupathi and Leander Paes.

Since retiring he has worked as a tennis coach and co founded sports apparel company Athletic DNA.

== ITF Futures titles ==
=== Singles: (1) ===
No.	Date	Tournament	Surface	Opponent	Score
1.	Oct 2001	Great Britain F10, Edinburgh	Hard	(Australia) Alun Jones	6–0, 6–2

=== Doubles: (2) ===
No.	Date	Tournament	Surface	Partner	Opponents	Score
1.	Sep 2001	Great Britain F8, Glasgow	Hard	(United Kingdom) Mark Hilton	(Australia) Luke Bourgeois (Australia) Alun Jones	6–2, 3–6, 7–6^{(5)}
2.	Nov 2001	Barbados F1, Bridgetown	Hard	(Netherlands) Fred Hemmes	(Puerto Rico) Gabriel Montilla (United States) Kiantki Thomas	6–4, 6–2

== See also ==
- List of New Zealand Davis Cup team representatives
