= Teo Susnjak =

New Zealand academic and tennis player

- Country (sports): New Zealand
- Born: 23 July 1977 (age 49) Split, Croatia
- Plays: Right-handed
- Prize money: $15,429

Singles
- Career record: 0–1
- Highest ranking: No. 362 (4 May 1998)

Grand Slam singles results
- Australian Open: Q2 (1997)
- US Open: Q1 (1998)

Doubles
- Highest ranking: No. 676 (8 Dec 1997)

Teo Susnjak (born 23 July 1977) is a New Zealand academic and former professional tennis player. He is a senior lecturer in computer science at Massey University.

Susnjak, a Croatian-born player, was an Australian Open junior quarter-finalist. Ranked as high as 362 in the world, he had a win over Lleyton Hewitt at the 1997 Perth Challenger and made an ATP Tour main draw appearance at the 1998 Heineken Open in Auckland. He represented the New Zealand Davis Cup team in a 1998 tie against Japan in Miyazaki, where he featured in two singles rubbers.

== See also ==
- List of New Zealand Davis Cup team representatives
