= 1999 Heineken Open =

- Date: 11–18 January
- Edition: 32nd
- Category: World Series
- Draw: 32S / 16D
- Prize money: $325,000
- Surface: Hard / outdoor
- Location: Auckland, New Zealand
- Venue: ASB Tennis Centre

Champions

Singles
- (Netherlands) Sjeng Schalken

Doubles
- (United States) Jeff Tarango / (Czech Republic) Daniel Vacek
- ATP Auckland Open

The 1999 Heineken Open was a men's ATP tennis tournament held in Auckland, New Zealand. It was the 32nd edition of the tournament and was held from 11 January to 18 January 1999 and was played on outdoor hard courts. Unseeded Sjeng Schalken won the singles title.

== Finals ==
=== Singles ===
(Netherlands) Sjeng Schalken defeated (Germany) Tommy Haas 6–4, 6–4

- It was Schalken's 1st title of the year and the 5th of his career.

=== Doubles ===
(United States) Jeff Tarango / (Czech Republic) Daniel Vacek defeated (Czech Republic) Jiří Novák / (Czech Republic) David Rikl 7–5, 7–5

- It was Tarango's 1st title of the year and the 9th of his career. It was Vacek's 1st title of the year and the 21st of his career.
