= William Ward (tennis) =

New Zealand tennis player

- Country (sports): New Zealand
- Residence: Auckland, New Zealand
- Born: 4 March 1986 (age 40) Auckland, New Zealand
- Turned pro: March 2004
- Retired: 2009
- Plays: Left-handed, two handed backhand
- Prize money: US$3,326

Singles
- Career record: 0-1 (Grand Slam, ATP Tour level, and Davis Cup)
- Career titles: 0
- Highest ranking: No. 1029 (23 October 2010)

Doubles
- Career record: 0-0
- Career titles: 0
- Highest ranking: No. 997 (12 July 2010)

Team competitions
- Davis Cup: 0–1
- Last updated on: 22 May 2021.

William Ward (born 4 March 1986) is a former New Zealand tennis player. He reached the height of his career on the junior circuit in 2004 with a ranking of 24 in the world, then went to college in USA before retiring from playing at only 23 after finishing his study at the University of Kentucky in 2009. He started coaching in 2013, he coaches players Michael Venus and Finn Tearney.

== Career ==
Ward started his junior tennis career in 2000 at the age of 14. He played his first grade 1 tournament in March 2003, his first grade B tournament in August 2003, and his first grade A tournament, the highest junior tournament level, in October 2003.

In March 2004 he was ranked among the top 30 in the junior circuit and was selected to represent New Zealand in the 2004 Davis Cup, he only competed in one game at the Davis Cup Indonesia at the first round playoffs in April, at the second round playoffs in Pakistan he was promised selection by the Davis Cup captain after playing US Open Juniors where he made the third round, however, once arriving in Pakistan he was not selected to play and this resulted with William Ward and the Davis Cup captain being in disagreement with each other over the selection process.

Earlier in the year he competed in the quarterfinals at 2004 Wimbledon boys' singles and was the top ranked New Zealand junior at the end of the year. He retired from tennis in 2009. He started coaching in 2013, coaching players Michael Venus, who won the 2017 French Open men's doubles, and Finn Tearney. He was also a member of the board of directors for Tennis NZ until 2021.

== Davis Cup ==
Legend
Group membership
World Group (0)
Group I (0–1)
Group II (0–0)
Group III (0)
Group IV (0)

- ▲ ▼ indicates the outcome of the Davis Cup match followed by the score, date, place of event, the zonal classification and its phase, and the court surface.

Rubber outcome	No.	Rubber	Match type (partner if any)	Opponent nation	Opponent player(s)	Score
▼0-5; 9–11 March 2004; Gelora Bung Karno Stadium, Jakarta, Indonesia; Group I Asia/Oceania First round play-offs; Hard surface
Defeat	2.	IV	Singles (dead rubber)	Indonesia	Febi Widhiyanto	4–6, 3–6

== ITF Futures finals ==
=== Doubles: 2 (0–2) ===
Result	W–L	Date	Tournament	Tier	Surface	Partner	Opponents	Score
Loss	0–1	Oct 2009	Thailand F5, Nakhon Ratchasima	Futures	Hard	(New Zealand) Matt Simpson	(Finland) Harri Heliövaara (Czech Republic) Roman Jebavý	2–6, 2–6
Loss	0–2	Nov 2009	Vietnam F1, Bình Dương	Futures	Hard	(New Zealand) Matt Simpson	(Thailand) Kirati Siributwong (New Zealand) Rubin Statham	4–6, 0–6

== ITF World Tennis Tour Juniors ==
=== Singles: 2 (2 runners-up) ===
Legend
Category JA (0–0)
Category J1 (0–0)
Category J2 (0–1)
Category J3 (0–0)
Category J4 (0–1)
Category J5 (0–0)

Result	W–L	Date	Tournament	Category	Surface	Opponent	Score
Loss	0–1	Feb 2003	Sunsmart 18 and Under Canterbury Championships, New Zealand	Category G4	Hard	(New Zealand) Kiril Tcherveniachki	3–6, 3–6
Loss	0–2	Oct 2003	Thailand Junior International Tennis Championships, Thailand	Category G2	Hard	(South Korea) Yi Chu-huan	3–6, 6–3, 3–6

=== Doubles: 3 (2 titles, 1 runner-up) ===
Legend
Category JA (0–0)
Category J1 (0–1)
Category J2 (0–0)
Category J3 (0–0)
Category J4 (2–0)
Category J5 (0–0)

Result	W–L	Date	Tournament	Category	Surface	Partner	Opponents	Score
Win	1–0	Feb 2003	Auckland 18 & Under Summer Championships, New Zealand	Category G4	Hard	(New Zealand) Kiril Tcherveniachki	(Australia) Guy Belcher (Australia) David Galic	6–2, 6–2
Win	2–0	Feb 2003	Sunsmart 18 and Under Canterbury Championships, New Zealand	Category G4	Hard	(New Zealand) Kiril Tcherveniachki	(Australia) Steven Fotakis (Australia) Patrick Jozwik	7–5, 6–4
Loss	2–1	Mar 2004	Amata Cup, 24th Thailand International Junior Tennis Championships, Thailand	Category G1	Hard	(India) Karan Rastogi	(South Korea) Jun Woong-sun (South Korea) Kim Sun-yong	1–6, 3–6

== See also ==
- New Zealand Davis Cup team
