= James Shortall =

New Zealand tennis player

- Country (sports): New Zealand
- Born: 25 December 1979 (age 46) Feilding, New Zealand
- Prize money: $17,765

Singles
- Highest ranking: No. 684 (8 Apr 2002)

Doubles
- Career record: 2–2
- Highest ranking: No. 313 (14 Oct 2002)

James Shortall (born 25 December 1979) is a New Zealand former professional tennis player.

Born and raised in Feilding, Shortall played collegiate tennis in the United States for the University of Mississippi. In 2000 he and teammate Vikrant Chadha made the doubles semi-finals of the NCAA championships.

Shortall represented the New Zealand Davis Cup team between 2000 and 2003. He was a two-time doubles quarter-finalist at the Heineken Open and won four ITF Futures titles in doubles.

== ITF Futures titles ==
=== Doubles: (4) ===
No.	Date	Tournament	Surface	Partner	Opponents	Score
1.	Aug 1998	Lithuania F1, Vilnius	Carpet	(Slovakia) Viktor Bruthans	(South Africa) Craig Campbell (United States) Mirko Pehar	2–6, 6–3, 7–5
2.	Sep 2000	USA F22A, East Hampton	Clay	(India) Vikrant Chadha	(Uruguay) Daniel Montes de Oca (Peru) Juan-Carlos Parker	6–4, 2–6, 6–3
3.	Oct 2001	USA F23, Jackson	Hard	(Sweden) Jon Wallmark	(Argentina) Matías Boeker (United States) Bo Hodge	7–6^{(6)}, 4–6, 6–4
4.	Sep 2002	USA F24B, Costa Mesa	Hard	(Sweden) Oskar Johansson	(India) Prakash Amritraj (United States) Rajeev Ram	7–6^{(0)}, 6–3

== See also ==
- List of New Zealand Davis Cup team representatives
