= 2002 Heineken Open =

- Date: 7–13 January
- Edition: 35th
- Category: International Series
- Draw: 32S / 16D
- Prize money: $332,000
- Surface: Hard / outdoor
- Location: Auckland, New Zealand
- Venue: ASB Tennis Centre

Champions

Singles
- (United Kingdom) Greg Rusedski

Doubles
- (Sweden) Jonas Björkman / (Australia) Todd Woodbridge
- ATP Auckland Open

The 2002 Heineken Open was a men's tennis tournament played on outdoor hard courts at the ASB Tennis Centre in Auckland in New Zealand and was part of the International Series of the 2002 ATP Tour. It was the 35th edition of the tournament and was held from 7 January through 13 January 2002. Sixth-seeded Greg Rusedski won the singles title.

== Finals ==
=== Singles ===
(United Kingdom) Greg Rusedski defeated (France) Jérôme Golmard 6–7^{(0–7)}, 6–4, 7–5

- It was Rusedski's 1st title of the year and the 14th of his career.

=== Doubles ===
(Sweden) Jonas Björkman / (Australia) Todd Woodbridge defeated (Argentina) Martín García / (Czech Republic) Cyril Suk 7–6^{(7–5)}, 7–6^{(9–7)}

- It was Björkman's 1st title of the year and the 30th of his career. It was Woodbridge's 1st title of the year and the 73rd of his career.
