= Simon Rea (tennis) =

New Zealand tennis player and coach

- Country (sports): New Zealand
- Born: 18 July 1982 (age 44)
- Plays: Left-handed
- Prize money: $25,566

Singles
- Career record: 2–4
- Highest ranking: No. 473 (13 August 2007)

Doubles
- Career record: 1–2
- Highest ranking: No. 657 (20 September 2004)

Simon Rea (born 18 July 1982) is a New Zealand tennis coach who works for Tennis Australia. The players he has coached include Nick Kyrgios.

Rea's highest ATP World Tour singles rank was World No. 473.

Rea received the 2013 award for Coaching Excellence, High Performance at the Newcombe Awards.

== Sources ==
- Simon Rea at the Association of Tennis Professionals
