= Dominik Hrbatý =

Slovak tennis player (born 1978)

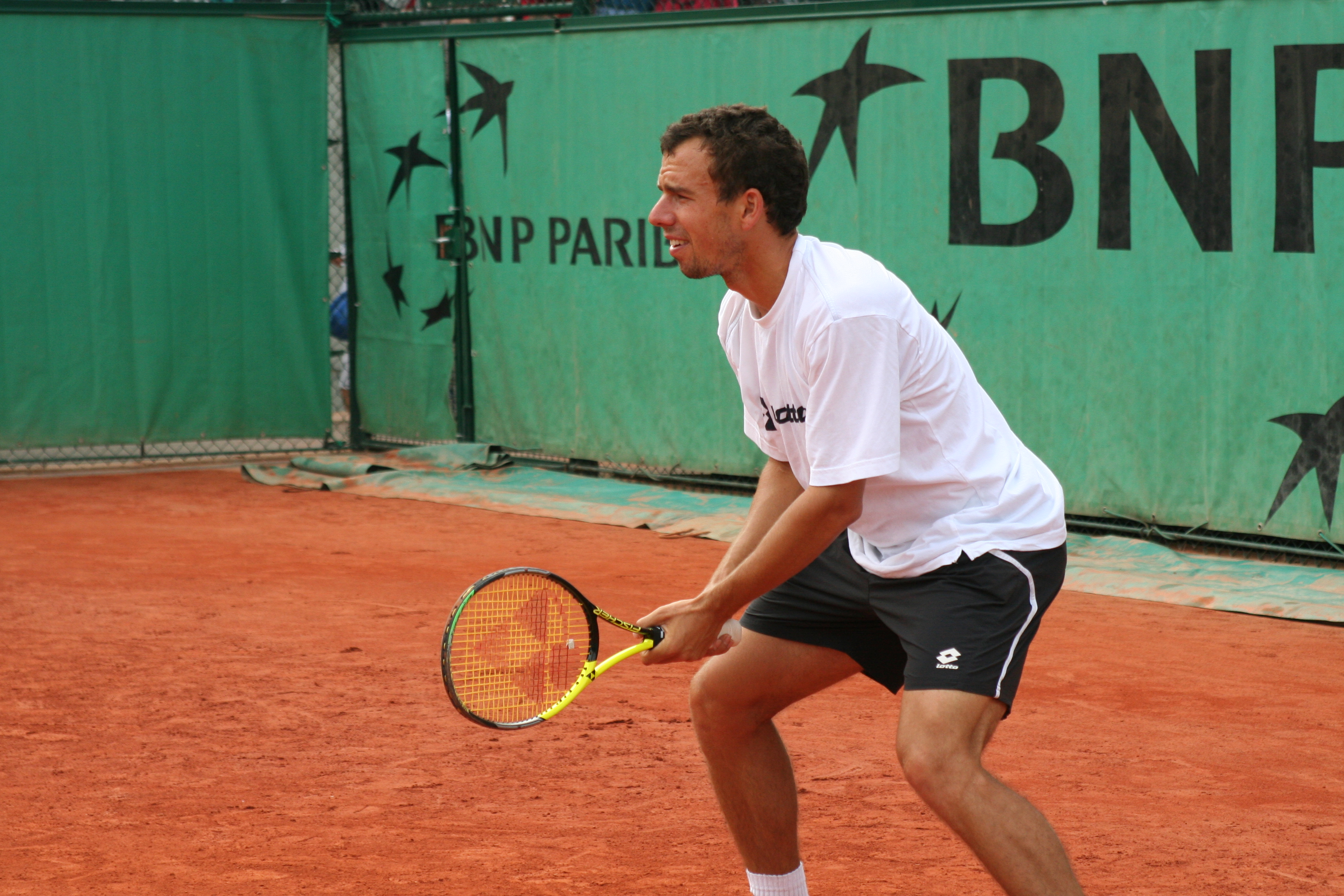
- Hrbatý in training during the 2006 French Open
- Country (sports): Slovakia
- Residence: Bratislava, Slovakia
- Born: 4 January 1978 (age 48) Bratislava, Czechoslovakia (Now Slovakia)
- Height: 1.80 m (5 ft 11 in)
- Turned pro: 1996
- Retired: 2014
- Plays: Right-handed (two-handed backhand)
- Prize money: US$ 7,065,241

Singles
- Career record: 359–318
- Career titles: 6
- Highest ranking: No. 12 (17 October 2005)

Grand Slam singles results
- Australian Open: QF (2001, 2005)
- French Open: SF (1999)
- Wimbledon: 3R (2004)
- US Open: QF (2004)

Other tournaments
- Grand Slam Cup: 1R (1999)
- Olympic Games: 2R (2004, 2008)

Doubles
- Career record: 150–211
- Career titles: 2
- Highest ranking: No. 14 (13 November 2000)

Team competitions
- Davis Cup: F (2005)
- Hopman Cup: W (2005, 2009)
Medal record
Men's tennis
Representing Slovakia
European Youth Olympic Festival
Bronze medal – third place	1993 Valkenswaard	Mixed Doubles

Dominik Hrbatý (Slovak pronunciation: [ˈdɔminiɡ ˈɦr̩batiː]; born 4 January 1978) is a Slovak former professional tennis player. Hrbatý reached the semifinals of the 1999 French Open, and achieved a career-high singles ranking of world No. 12 in October 2005. Hrbatý is one of only three players, alongside Nick Kyrgios and Lleyton Hewitt, to have beaten each member of the Big Three (Novak Djokovic, Roger Federer, and Rafael Nadal) the first time he played them.

Hrbatý is one of a select few players to have competed on the ATP Tour with a positive winning record against Federer (2–1), Nadal (3–1), and Murray (1–0). Hrbatý's record against Djokovic stands at 1–1 (or 0–1 at tour-level events). Hrbaty, Alex Corretja and Novak Djokovic are the only players to have a winning record over Roger Federer and Rafael Nadal.

== Personal life ==
Hrbatý was born on 4 January 1978 in Bratislava, Czechoslovakia. His father was an architecture engineer and his younger brother is an umpire. When he was younger, Hrbatý was European junior competitor in skiing and from the age of 11, he focused on tennis full-time.

He is married to Nelly Petrová; he proposed after Slovakia won the Hopman Cup on 10 January 2009 (with Dominika Cibulková). He also won the tournament for Slovakia in 2005 with Daniela Hantuchová. This makes Hrbatý a dual winner to move into the company of Serena Williams, James Blake, Tommy Robredo and Arantxa Sánchez Vicario.

== Tennis career ==
Hrbatý turned professional in 1996. During the year he reached six Challenger finals and achieved a 35–15 match record. He ended the year as the youngest player in the top 100.

In 1997, Hrbatý won the Košice Challenger title defeating Nicolás Lapentti. He also reached his first ATP Tour final in Palermo, losing to Alberto Berasategui. His first doubles success on the Tour was reaching the final of Umag with Karol Kučera.

Hrbatý broke through for his first ATP title in 1998 in San Marino and defended his title in Košice. He continued his form into 1999 capturing his second title in Prague. His greatest breakthrough was reaching the semi-finals of Roland Garros where he defeated Julien Boutter, Yevgeny Kafelnikov, Andrew Ilie, Marat Safin and Marcelo Ríos before falling to eventual winner, Andre Agassi.

Despite not winning a title in 2000, Hrbatý reached three finals in Monte Carlo, St. Petersburg and Brighton. During the year he helped Slovakia win the ATP World Team Championship where he had wins over Pete Sampras and Kafelnikov. While not winning a title in singles, he won the Rome Masters doubles title with Martin Damm and reached another three finals.

2001 got off to a quick start for Hrbatý, winning in Auckland for his third ATP title, defeating at the final the Spaniard Francisco Clavet. He backed up that win with a quarter-finals appearance at the Australian Open. On his way he defeated number two seed, Marat Safin. Other notable singles results were reaching the semi-finals in Dubai, Tashkent and Moscow. Hrbatý helped Slovakia back into the World Group stage in Davis Cup by defeating Nicolás Massú and Rios in 5 sets coming from two sets down in each match. Hrbatý teamed up with Roger Federer in the men's doubles at the Australian Open in 2001. However they were knocked out by Thomas Shimada and Myles Wakefield.

Hrbatý had an average year in 2002 where he finished out of the top 50 for the first time since 1996. He won a Challenger title in Biella. In 2003, Hrbatý made the final in Auckland losing to Gustavo Kuerten. Also made the semi-finals in Casablanca and Umag. Defeated Andy Roddick in the Davis Cup to end the American's 19-match winning streak.

Hrbatý's best season in his career to date was in 2004. He started the season with back-to-back title wins in Auckland and Adelaide. The Auckland victory was over Rafael Nadal in the final. Then won his sixth career title in Marseille and then made it to the final in Casablanca. He achieved one of his best wins by defeating World No. 1 Roger Federer in Cincinnati and then made it to the quarter-finals of the US Open.

In 2005, Hrbatý finished in the top 20 despite not reaching a singles final. His best results were semi-finals in Los Angeles, Metz and Basel. He had good success in the ATP Masters Series in Miami, Rome and Montreal, where he reached the quarter-finals.

Also in 2005, Hrbatý helped Slovakia reach the Davis Cup final against Croatia. He compiled a 6–1 singles record during the season. Inflicted Ivan Ljubičić's only singles loss in the final but Slovakia lost the final 2–3.

2006 was a mixed year for Hrbatý. He reached his second Tennis Masters Series title final in Paris losing to Nikolay Davydenko, which helped him finish in the top 25 in the year-end rankings. Other results were semi-finals in Los Angeles and Vienna and a quarter-finals in Beijing.

Hrbatý's form started to drop in 2007. He was plagued by an elbow injury which severely limited his play in that season.

At the 2007 U.S. Open, in doubles, he lost to Jesse Levine and Alex Kuznetsov, while pairing with Harel Levy of Israel, 6–1, 6–4.

At the 2008 Wimbledon Championships, Hrbatý lost to his good friend and former doubles partner Federer in the first round, 6–3, 6–2, 6–2. Hrbatý sat immediately next to Federer and had an amicable conversation with him during the last changeover of the match, telling Federer that this may be Hrbatý's last Wimbledon and that, as a joke, this has been the first victory for Federer in a match against him and leads him 2–1 in head to head.

In 2010, Hrbaty announced his retirement as he became a father for the first time. In 2012, Hrbaty temporarily returned to professional tennis by playing in the qualifying tournament for the 2012 Heineken Open. He won his first round of qualifying by beating Pere Riba in straight sets 6–4, 6–2.

== Major finals ==
=== ATP Masters 1000 finals ===
==== Singles: 2 (0–2) ====
Result	Date	Tournament	Surface	Opponent	Score
Loss	Apr 2000	Monte Carlo, Monaco	Clay	(France) Cédric Pioline	3–6, 6–7^{(3–7)}, 6–7^{(6–8)}
Loss	Nov 2006	Paris, France	Carpet (i)	(Russia) Nikolay Davydenko	1–6, 2–6, 2–6

==== Doubles: 1 (1–1) ====
Result	Date	Tournament	Surface	Partner	Opponents	Score
Loss	Apr 2000	Miami. U.S.	Hard	(Czech Republic) Martin Damm	(Australia) Todd Woodbridge (Australia) Mark Woodforde	6–3, 6–4
Win	May 2000	Rome, Italy	Clay	(Czech Republic) Martin Damm	(South Africa) Wayne Ferreira (Russia) Yevgeny Kafelnikov	6–4, 4–6, 6–3

== Career finals ==
=== Singles: 13 (6–7) ===
Legend (singles) Grand Slam (0) Tennis Masters Cup (0) ATP Masters Series (0) ATP Tour (6)	Titles by surface Hard (4) Clay (2) Grass (0) Carpet (0)

Result	W/L	Date	Tournament	Surface	Opponent	Score
Loss	0–1	Sep 1997	Palermo, Italy	Clay	(Spain) Alberto Berasategui	4–6, 2–6
Win	1–1	Aug 1998	San Marino	Clay	(Argentina) Mariano Puerta	6–2, 7–5
Win	2–1	Apr 1999	Prague, Czech Republic	Clay	(Czech Republic) Sláva Doseděl	6–2, 6–2
Loss	2–2	Apr 2000	Monte Carlo, Monaco	Clay	(France) Cédric Pioline	4–6, 6–7^{(3–7)}, 6–7^{(6–8)}
Loss	2–3	Nov 2000	St. Petersburg, Russia	Hard (i)	(Russia) Marat Safin	6–2, 4–6, 4–6
Loss	2–4	Nov 2000	Brighton, United Kingdom	Hard (i)	(United Kingdom) Tim Henman	2–6, 2–6
Win	3–4	Jan 2001	Auckland, New Zealand	Hard	(Spain) Francisco Clavet	6–4, 2–6, 6–3
Loss	3–5	Jan 2003	Auckland, New Zealand	Hard	(Brazil) Gustavo Kuerten	3–6, 5–7
Win	4–5	Jan 2004	Adelaide, Australia	Hard	(France) Michaël Llodra	6–4, 6–0
Win	5–5	Jan 2004	Auckland, New Zealand	Hard	(Spain) Rafael Nadal	4–6, 6–2, 7–5
Win	6–5	Feb 2004	Marseille, France	Hard (i)	(Sweden) Robin Söderling	4–6, 6–4, 6–4
Loss	6–6	May 2004	Casablanca, Morocco	Clay	(Spain) Santiago Ventura	3–6, 6–1, 4–6
Loss	6–7	Oct 2006	Paris, France	Carpet (i)	(Russia) Nikolay Davydenko	1–6, 2–6, 2–6

== Performance timeline ==
Key
W	F	SF	QF	#R	RR	Q#	DNQ	A	NH

(W) winner; (F) finalist; (SF) semifinalist; (QF) quarterfinalist; (#R) rounds 4, 3, 2, 1; (RR) round-robin stage; (Q#) qualification round; (DNQ) did not qualify; (A) absent; (NH) not held; (SR) strike rate (events won / competed); (W–L) win–loss record.

=== Singles ===
Tournament	1996	1997	1998	1999	2000	2001	2002	2003	2004	2005	2006	2007	2008	2009	2010	SR	W–L
Australian Open	A	4R	1R	1R	1R	QF	4R	1R	3R	QF	4R	3R	A	2R	A	0 / 11	21–11
French Open	A	1R	3R	SF	2R	2R	1R	2R	2R	1R	3R	1R	1R	Q3	Q1	0 / 12	13–12
Wimbledon	A	1R	1R	1R	2R	1R	1R	1R	3R	2R	1R	1R	1R	Q2	Q1	0 / 12	4–12
US Open	A	1R	2R	1R	4R	2R	3R	2R	QF	4R	1R	1R	1R	Q1	A	0 / 12	15–12
Win–loss	0–0	3–4	3–4	5–4	5–4	6–4	5–4	2–4	9–4	8–4	5–4	2–4	0–3	1–1	0–0	0 / 48	54–48
Olympic Games
Summer Olympics	A	NH			1R	NH			2R	NH			2R	NH		0 / 3	2–3
ATP Masters Series
Indian Wells Masters	A	1R	1R	A	2R	1R	1R	1R	3R	2R	3R	2R	Q1	A	A	0 / 10	3–10
Miami Masters	A	4R	2R	QF	4R	3R	1R	1R	3R	QF	2R	1R	1R	A	A	0 / 12	15–12
Monte-Carlo Masters	A	1R	A	1R	F	1R	2R	1R	1R	1R	2R	2R	Q1	A	A	0 / 10	8–10
Rome Masters	A	A	A	2R	QF	1R	A	2R	1R	QF	2R	1R	A	A	A	0 / 8	9–8
Hamburg Masters	A	1R	1R	1R	1R	1R	A	1R	2R	3R	2R	1R	A	A	A	0 / 10	4–10
Canada Masters	A	A	A	A	A	2R	1R	A	1R	QF	2R	3R	A	A	A	0 / 6	7–6
Cincinnati Masters	A	A	A	A	1R	1R	2R	A	2R	3R	3R	1R	A	A	A	0 / 7	6–7
Madrid Masters (Stuttgart)	A	A	A	2R	2R	1R	A	Q1	2R	3R	2R	A	A	A	A	0 / 6	4–6
Paris Masters	A	A	A	1R	2R	2R	2R	2R	2R	3R	F	A	A	A	A	0 / 8	9–8
Career statistics
Titles	0	0	1	1	0	1	0	0	3	0	0	0	0	0	0	6	
Overall win–loss	0–2	27–23	34–29	38–32	44–29	31–30	23–29	26–26	42–26	43–26	32–28	10–21	5–9	4–7	0–1	359–318	
Year End Ranking	78	40	46	21	17	36	51	61	14	18	21	136	253	141	417	$7,068,735	

== Top 10 wins ==
Season	1997	1998	1999	2000	2001	2002	2003	2004	2005	2006	2007	2008	2009	2010	Total
Wins	1	0	5	8	3	3	2	1	5	2	1	0	0	0	31

#	Player	Rank	Event	Surface	Rd	Score	Hrbatý Rank
1997
1.	(Russia) Yevgeny Kafelnikov	3	St. Pölten, Austria	Clay	1R	6–3, 6–3	50
1999
2.	(Russia) Yevgeny Kafelnikov	3	Marseille, France	Hard (i)	2R	6–7^{(4–7)}, 6–4, 6–2	43
3.	(United States) Andre Agassi	9	Miami, United States	Hard	2R	1–6, 6–3, 6–2	40
4.	(Chile) Marcelo Ríos	8	Miami, United States	Hard	4R	6–2, 6–0	40
5.	(Russia) Yevgeny Kafelnikov	1	French Open, Paris, France	Clay	2R	6–4, 6–1, 6–4	30
6.	(Chile) Marcelo Ríos	9	French Open, Paris, France	Clay	QF	7–6^{(7–4)}, 6–2, 6–7^{(6–8)}, 6–3	30
2000
7.	(Brazil) Gustavo Kuerten	4	Davis Cup, Rio de Janeiro, Brazil	Clay	RR	7–5, 6–4, 7–6^{(7–5)}	25
8.	(Russia) Yevgeny Kafelnikov	3	Monte Carlo, Monaco	Clay	2R	6–3, 5–7, 6–4	24
9.	(United States) Andre Agassi	1	Rome, Italy	Clay	3R	6–4, 6–4	17
10.	(United States) Pete Sampras	2	World Team Cup, Düsseldorf, Germany	Clay	RR	0–6, 6–4, 6–4	14
11.	(Russia) Yevgeny Kafelnikov	4	World Team Cup, Düsseldorf, Germany	Clay	F	6–4, 7–6^{(7–1)}	14
12.	(Russia) Yevgeny Kafelnikov	6	US Open, New York, United States	Hard	3R	6–4, 7–6^{(7–5)}, 6–1	36
13.	(Brazil) Gustavo Kuerten	3	Tokyo, Japan	Hard	QF	6–7^{(6–8)}, 6–2, 3–0, ret.	33
14.	(Russia) Yevgeny Kafelnikov	5	St. Petersburg, Russia	Hard (i)	SF	7–5, 6–3	22
2001
15.	(Russia) Marat Safin	2	Australian Open, Melbourne, Australia	Hard	4R	6–2, 7–6^{(8–6)}, 6–4	16
16.	(Russia) Marat Safin	1	Davis Cup, Bratislava, Slovakia	Hard (i)	RR	6–3, 6–1, 6–4	14
17.	(Russia) Marat Safin	7	Moscow, Russia	Carpet (i)	2R	6–0, 4–6, 7–6^{(7–5)}	28
2002
18.	(France) Sébastien Grosjean	9	Barcelona, Spain	Clay	2R	6–3, 6–4	62
19.	(France) Sébastien Grosjean	10	Cincinnati, United States	Hard	1R	6–3, 3–6, 6–4	54
20.	(Russia) Yevgeny Kafelnikov	4	US Open, New York, United States	Hard	2R	6–3, 6–1, 6–1	52
2003
21.	(Thailand) Paradorn Srichaphan	10	French Open, Paris, France	Clay	1R	6–4, 3–6, 6–0, 7–5	62
22.	(United States) Andy Roddick	2	Davis Cup, Bratislava, Slovakia	Clay	RR	3–6, 6–3, 6–4, 6–4	60
2004
23.	(Switzerland) Roger Federer	1	Cincinnati, United States	Hard	1R	1–6, 7–6^{(9–7)}, 6–4	21
2005
24.	(Argentina) Gastón Gaudio	10	Australian Open, Melbourne, Australia	Hard	3R	7–6^{(7–5)}, 6–7^{(8–10)}, 6–7^{(3–7)}, 6–1, 6–3	27
25.	(Russia) Marat Safin	4	Miami, United States	Hard	3R	7–6^{(8–6)}, 6–1	28
26.	(United Kingdom) Tim Henman	6	Rome, Italy	Clay	3R	6–3, 3–6, 6–3	24
27.	(Argentina) Guillermo Coria	8	Davis Cup, Bratislava, Slovakia	Hard (i)	RR	7–6^{(7–2)}, 6–2, 6–3	19
28.	(Croatia) Ivan Ljubičić	9	Davis Cup, Bratislava, Slovakia	Hard (i)	RR	4–6, 6–3, 6–4, 3–6, 6–4	19
2006
29.	(Croatia) Ivan Ljubičić	4	Rome, Italy	Clay	1R	5–7, 7–6^{(7–4)}, 6–4	24
30.	(Czech Republic) Tomáš Berdych	10	Paris, France	Carpet (i)	QF	6–4, 1–6, 6–2	27
2007
31.	(Spain) Tommy Robredo	7	Montreal, Canada	Hard	2R	6–2, 6–4	32

Awards
Preceded by (Australia) Mark Philippoussis	ATP Newcomer of the Year; 1996	Succeeded by (Spain) Julián Alonso
Preceded by Elena Kaliská	Sportsperson of Slovakia; 2005	Succeeded by Radoslav Židek
