= Mark Nielsen (tennis) =

New Zealand tennis player

- Country (sports): New Zealand
- Born: 8 October 1977 (age 49) Auckland
- Height: 1.85 m (6 ft 1 in)
- Turned pro: 1997
- Plays: Right-handed
- Prize money: $166,271

Singles
- Career record: 22–21
- Career titles: 0
- Highest ranking: No. 172 (15 May 2000)

Doubles
- Career record: 8–11
- Career titles: 0
- Highest ranking: No. 171 (15 September 2003)

Mark Nielsen (born 8 October 1977) is a former professional tennis player from New Zealand.

== Career ==
Nielsen had a highest junior ranking of 16th and during his early career on the juniors circuit had wins over Dominik Hrbatý, Mark Philippoussis and Paradorn Srichaphan. At the 1994 Australian Open, Nielsen and partner Jean-Noel Grinda Jr made the boys' doubles semi-finals. The following year he and countryman Teo Susnjak won doubles titles at the Australian Hardcourt Junior Championships and Philippines Junior Championships.

In 1997, Nielsen began playing Davis Cup tennis for New Zealand. He took part in a World Group play-off tie against Spain in 1999, which the New Zealanders lost without winning a match. Nielsen lost both of his singles rubbers, to Félix Mantilla and Francisco Clavet, but did take the former into a fifth set.

Nielsen was a wildcard entrant at the 1998 Heineken Open and in front of his home crowd defeated Brazilian Fernando Meligeni in the opening round, before being eliminated by Marcelo Ríos. He competed in the Heineken Open a further seven times and also reached the second round in 2002, with a win over seventh seed and world number 33 Andreas Vinciguerra. With partner James Shortall, Nielsen also made the quarter-finals of the doubles that year. He was a doubles quarter-finalist again at the Heineken Open in 2003 and 2004.

At Islamabad in 2004, Nielsen played the longest match in New Zealand's Davis Cup history, against Pakistan's Aisam Qureshi. The five set match lasted for five hours and 20 minutes.

In 2006, a sample that Nielsen had provided while playing the qualifying stages at the Australian Open, tested positive for finasteride, which can be used as a masking agent. An independent Anti-Doping Tribunal accepted Nielsen's claim that he took the product containing the positive substance to treat hair-loss, but found that by failing to check whether the hair-loss product contained such a substance indicated a "serious dereliction of duty on the part of any player who participates in a sport governed by the WADA Code". He was given a two-year suspension by the International Tennis Federation.

The ban effectively ended his career, but once the suspension ended he did briefly return to compete on the Futures circuit and he played a Davis Cup tie in Kuwait. That would be his 20th and final Davis Cup tie, a tally bettered only by Onny Parun. He finished with 25 Davis Cup wins to his name, from 43 rubbers. His 20 wins for New Zealand in singles also has him second all-time, to Onny Parun.

== Challenger titles ==
=== Doubles: (3) ===
No.	Year	Tournament	Surface	Partner	Opponents	Score
1.	2000	Weiden, Germany	Clay	(Russia) Andrei Stoliarov	(Germany) Daniel Elsner (Germany) Andy Fahlke	7–5, 6–3
2.	2002	Seoul, South Korea	Hard	(Australia) Jaymon Crabb	(Argentina) Federico Browne (Netherlands) Rogier Wassen	W/O
3.	2005	Tolyatti, Russia	Hard	(United States) Scott Lipsky	(Italy) Flavio Cipolla (Italy) Massimo Ocera	6–2, 6–3
