= 2005 ATP Masters Series =

Men's professional tennis tour

Details
- Duration: March 14 – November 6
- Edition: 16th
- Tournaments: 9

Achievements (singles)
- Most titles: (Switzerland) Roger Federer (Spain) Rafael Nadal (4)
- Most finals: (Spain) Rafael Nadal (5)

The table below shows the 2005 Tennis Masters Series schedule.

The ATP Masters Series are part of the elite tour for professional men's tennis organised by the Association of Tennis Professionals.

== Results ==
* First-time champion

Masters	Singles champions	Runners-up	Score	Doubles champions	Runners-up	Score
Indian Wells Singles – Doubles	(Switzerland) Roger Federer	(Australia) Lleyton Hewitt	6–2, 6–4, 6–4	(The Bahamas) Mark Knowles (Canada) Daniel Nestor	(Australia) Wayne Arthurs (Australia) Paul Hanley	7–6, 7–6
Miami Singles – Doubles	(Switzerland) Roger Federer	(Spain) Rafael Nadal	2–6, 6–7^{(4–7)}, 7–6^{(7–5)}, 6–3, 6–1	(Sweden) Jonas Björkman (Belarus) Max Mirnyi	(Zimbabwe) Wayne Black (Zimbabwe) Kevin Ullyett	6–1, 6–2
Monte Carlo Singles – Doubles	(Spain) Rafael Nadal*	(Argentina) Guillermo Coria	6–3, 6–1, 0–6, 7–5	(India) Leander Paes (Serbia and Montenegro) Nenad Zimonjić	(United States) Bob Bryan (United States) Mike Bryan	W/O
Rome Singles – Doubles	(Spain) Rafael Nadal	(Argentina) Guillermo Coria	6–4, 3–6, 6–3, 4–6, 7–6^{(8–6)}	(France) Michaël Llodra*	(United States) Bob Bryan (United States) Mike Bryan	7–5, 6–4
Rome Singles – Doubles	(Spain) Rafael Nadal	(Argentina) Guillermo Coria	6–4, 3–6, 6–3, 4–6, 7–6^{(8–6)}	(France) Fabrice Santoro	(United States) Bob Bryan (United States) Mike Bryan	7–5, 6–4
Hamburg Singles – Doubles	(Switzerland) Roger Federer	(France) Richard Gasquet	6–3, 7–5, 7–6^{(7–4)}	(Sweden) Jonas Björkman (Belarus) Max Mirnyi	(France) Michaël Llodra (France) Fabrice Santoro	6–2, 6–3
Montreal Singles – Doubles	(Spain) Rafael Nadal	(United States) Andre Agassi	6–3, 4–6, 6–2	(Zimbabwe) Wayne Black (Zimbabwe) Kevin Ullyett	(Israel) Jonathan Erlich (Israel) Andy Ram	6–7^{(5–7)}, 6–3, 6–0
Cincinnati Singles – Doubles	(Switzerland) Roger Federer	(United States) Andy Roddick	6–3, 7–5	(Sweden) Jonas Björkman (Belarus) Max Mirnyi	(Zimbabwe) Wayne Black (Zimbabwe) Kevin Ullyett	6–4, 5–7, 6–2
Madrid Singles – Doubles	(Spain) Rafael Nadal	(Croatia) Ivan Ljubičić	3–6, 2–6, 6–3, 6–4, 7–6^{(7–3)}	(The Bahamas) Mark Knowles (Canada) Daniel Nestor	(India) Leander Paes (Serbia and Montenegro) Nenad Zimonjić	3–6, 6–3, 6–2
Paris Singles – Doubles	(Czech Republic) Tomáš Berdych*	(Croatia) Ivan Ljubičić	6–3, 6–4, 3–6, 4–6, 6–4	(United States) Bob Bryan (United States) Mike Bryan	(The Bahamas) Mark Knowles (Canada) Daniel Nestor	6–4, 6–7^{(3–7)}, 6–4

== Titles Champions ==
=== Singles ===
#	Player	IN	MI	MO	HA	RO	CA	CI	MA	PA	#	Winning span
1.	(United States) Andre Agassi	1	6	-	-	1	3	3	1	2	17	1990–2004 (15)
2.	(United States) Pete Sampras	2	3	-	-	1	-	3	-	2	11	1992–2000 (9)
3.	(Switzerland) Roger Federer	2	1	-	3	-	1	1	-	-	8	2002–2005 (4)
	(Austria) Thomas Muster	-	1	3	-	3	-	-	1	-	8	1990–1997 (8)
5.	(United States) Michael Chang	3	1	-	-	-	1	2	-	-	7	1990–1997 (8)
6.	(United States) Jim Courier	2	1	-	-	2	-	-	-	-	5	1991–1993 (3)
	(Germany) Boris Becker	-	-	-	-	-	-	-	4	1	5	1990–1996 (7)
	(Brazil) Gustavo Kuerten	-	-	2	1	1	-	1	-	-	5	1999–2001 (3)
	(Chile) Marcelo Ríos	1	1	1	1	1	-	-	-	-	5	1997–1999 (3)
	(Russia) Marat Safin	-	-	-	-	-	1	-	1	3	5	2000–2004 (5)
11.	(Sweden) Stefan Edberg	1	-	-	1	-	-	1	-	1	4	1990–1992 (3)
	(Spain) Juan Carlos Ferrero	-	-	2	-	1	-	1	-	-	4	2001–2003 (3)
	(Ukraine) Andrei Medvedev	-	-	1	3	-	-	-	-	-	4	1994–1997 (4)
	(Spain) Rafael Nadal	-	-	1	-	1	1	-	1	-	4	2005
15.	(Sweden) Thomas Enqvist	-	-	-	-	-	-	1	1	1	3	1996–2000 (5)
	(Spain) Carlos Moyá	-	-	1	-	1	-	1	-	-	3	1998–2004 (7)
	(United States) Andy Roddick	-	1	-	-	-	1	1	-	-	3	2003–2004 (2)
18.	(Spain) Sergi Bruguera	-	-	2	-	-	-	-	-	-	2	1991–1993 (3)
	(Russia) Andrei Chesnokov	-	-	1	-	-	1	-	-	-	2	1990–1991 (2)
	(Argentina) Guillermo Coria	-	-	1	1	-	-	-	-	-	2	2003–2004 (2)
	(Spain) Àlex Corretja	1	-	-	-	1	-	-	-	-	2	1997–2000 (4)
	(South Africa) Wayne Ferreira	-	-	-	-	-	1	-	1	-	2	1996–2000 (5)
	(France) Guy Forget	-	-	-	-	-	-	1	-	1	2	1991
	(Australia) Lleyton Hewitt	2	-	-	-	-	-	-	-	-	2	2002–2003 (2)
	(Croatia) Goran Ivanišević	-	-	-	-	-	-	-	1	1	2	1992–1993 (2)
	(Netherlands) Richard Krajicek	-	1	-	-	-	-	-	1	-	2	1998–1999 (2)
	(Australia) Patrick Rafter	-	-	-	-	-	1	1	-	-	2	1998
	(Germany) Michael Stich	-	-	-	1	-	-	-	1	-	2	1993
29.	(Spain) Juan Aguilera	-	-	-	1	-	-	-	-	-	1	1990
	(Czech Republic) Tomáš Berdych	-	-	-	-	-	-	-	-	1	1	2005
	(Argentina) Guillermo Cañas	-	-	-	-	-	1	-	-	-	1	2002
	(Spain) Albert Costa	-	-	-	1	-	-	-	-	-	1	1998
	(Spain) Roberto Carretero	-	-	-	1	-	-	-	-	-	1	1996
	(France) Sébastien Grosjean	-	-	-	-	-	-	-	-	1	1	2001
	(Germany) Tommy Haas	-	-	-	-	-	-	-	1	-	1	2001
	(United Kingdom) Tim Henman	-	-	-	-	-	-	-	-	1	1	2003
	(Sweden) Thomas Johansson	-	-	-	-	-	1	-	-	-	1	1999
	(Czech Republic) Petr Korda	-	-	-	-	-	-	-	1	-	1	1997
	(Spain) Félix Mantilla	-	-	-	-	1	-	-	-	-	1	2003
	(Sweden) Magnus Norman	-	-	-	-	1	-	-	-	-	1	2000
	(Czech Republic) Karel Nováček	-	-	-	1	-	-	-	-	-	1	1991
	(Romania) Andrei Pavel	-	-	-	-	-	1	-	-	-	1	2001
	(Sweden) Mikael Pernfors	-	-	-	-	-	1	-	-	-	1	1993
	(Australia) Mark Philippoussis	1	-	-	-	-	-	-	-	-	1	1999
	(France) Cédric Pioline	-	-	1	-	-	-	-	-	-	1	2000
	(Spain) Albert Portas	-	-	-	-	1	-	-	-	-	1	2001
	(United Kingdom) Greg Rusedski	-	-	-	-	-	-	-	-	1	1	1998
	(Spain) Emilio Sánchez	-	-	-	-	1	-	-	-	-	1	1991
	(United States) Chris Woodruff	-	-	-	-	-	1	-	-	-	1	1997
#	Player	IN	MI	MO	HA	RO	CA	CI	ST	PA	#	Winning span

== See also ==
- ATP Tour Masters 1000
- 2005 ATP Tour
- 2005 WTA Tier I Series
- 2005 WTA Tour
