= 2005 Tennis Masters Cup =

- Date: 13–20 November
- Edition: 36th (singles) / 31st (doubles)
- Category: Masters
- Draw: 8S / 8D
- Prize money: $3,700,000
- Surface: Carpet (i)
- Location: Shanghai, China
- Venue: Qizhong Forest Sports City Arena

Champions

Singles
- (Argentina) David Nalbandian

Doubles
- (France) Michaël Llodra / (France) Fabrice Santoro
← 2004 ·	ATP Finals	· 2006 →

The 2005 Tennis Masters Cup was a men's tennis tournament played on indoor carpet courts. It was the 36th edition of the year-end singles championships, the 31st edition of the year-end doubles championships, and was part of the 2005 ATP Tour. It took place at the Qizhong Forest Sports City Arena in Shanghai, China, from November 13 through November 20, 2005. David Nalbandian won the singles title.

== Finals ==
=== Singles ===
(Argentina) David Nalbandian defeated (Switzerland) Roger Federer 6–7^{(4–7)}, 6–7^{(11–13)}, 6–2, 6–1, 7–6^{(7–3)}

- It was Nalbandian's 2nd title of the year, and his 4th overall. It was his 1st career year-end championships title.

=== Doubles ===
(France) Michaël Llodra / (France) Fabrice Santoro defeated (India) Leander Paes / (Serbia and Montenegro) Nenad Zimonjić 6–7^{(6–8)}, 6–3, 7–6^{(7–4)}

== Points and prize money ==
Stage	Singles	Doubles^{1}	Points
Champion	RR + $980,000	RR +$125,000	RR + 450
Runner-up	RR + $370,000	RR +$25,000	RR + 200
Round robin win per match	$120,000	$15,000	100
Participation fee	$90,000^{2}	$50,000	–

- RR is points or prize money won in the round robin stage.
- ^{1} Prize money for doubles is per team.
- ^{2} Participation fee for 1 RR match is $45,000 and for 2 RR matches is $70,000.
- An undefeated singles champion would earn the maximum 750 points and $1,520,000 in prize money ($120,000 participation, $360,000 undefeated round robin, $370,000 semifinal win, $700,000 final win)
- An undefeated doubles champion would earn the maximum 750 points and $220,000 in prize money ($50,000 participation, $45,000 undefeated round robin, $25,000 semifinal win, $100,000 final win). While each of them would get 1,500 points, the $220,000 would be split, so $110,000 for each member of the team.

== Points breakdown ==
=== Singles ===
Seed	Rank	Player	Grand Slam				ATP World Tour Masters 1000									Best Other					Total points	Tourn
Seed	Rank	Player	AUS	FRA	WIM	USO	IW	MIA	MC	ROM	HAM	CAN	CIN	MAD	PAR	1	2	3	4	5	Total points	Tourn
1	1	(Switzerland) Roger Federer	SF; 90	SF; 90	W 200	W 200	W 100	W 100	QF; 25	A 0	W 100	A 0	W 100	A 0	A 0	W 60	W 50	W 50	W 45	W 35	1,245	18
2	2	(Spain) Rafael Nadal	R16; 30	W 200	R64; 7	R32; 15	A 0	F 70	W 100	W 100	A 0	W 100	R64; 1	W 100	A 0	W 60	W 50	W 50	W 35	W 35	953	24
—	3	(United States) Andy Roddick	SF; 90	R64; 7	F 140	R128; 1	SF; 45	R64; 1	A 0	R16; 15	R64; 1	R64; 1	F 70	R32; 1	SF; 45	W 45	W 45	W 40	W 35	W 35	617	20
—	4	(Australia) Lleyton Hewitt	F 140	A 0	SF; 90	SF; 90	F 70	A 0	A 0	A 0	A 0	R64; 1	SF; 45	A 0	A 0	W 35	QF; 11	QF; 8	QF; 8		498	17
3	5	(United States) Andre Agassi	QF; 50	R128; 1	A 0	F 140	QF; 25	SF; 45	A 0	SF; 45	R64; 1	F 70	A 0	A 0	A 0	W 35	QF; 27	QF; 8	QF; 8		455	17
4	6	(Argentina) Guillermo Coria	R16; 30	R16; 30	R16; 30	QF; 50	R16; 15	R32; 7	F 70	F 70	Q 25	R64; 1	R32; 7	R16; 15	R32; 1	W 35	F 24	SF; 15	QF; 8	QF; 5	438	22
5	7	(Russia) Nikolay Davydenko	QF; 50	SF; 90	R64; 7	R64; 7	R64; 1	R64; 1	R16; 15	R64; 1	SF; 45	R16; 15	QF; 25	R16; 15	QF; 25	W 35	SF; 27	SF; 22	SF; 22	QF; 15	418	29
6	8	(Croatia) Ivan Ljubičić	R64; 7	R128; 1	R18; 1	R32; 15	R16; 15	R16; 15	R64; 1	R16; 15	R32; 7	R64; 1	R64; 1	F 70	F 70	W 50	F 42	W 35	F 35	F 35	416	23
7	9	(Argentina) Gastón Gaudio	R32; 15	R16; 30	A 0	R128; 1	R32; 7	R16; 15	QF; 25	R16; 15	R16; 15	QF; 25	R64; 1	R32; 1	QF; 25	W 50	W 40	W 35	W 35	W 35	370	24
—	10	(Russia) Marat Safin	W 200	R16; 30	R32; 15	A 0	R32; 7	R32; 7	R16; 15	R32; 7	R32; 7	A 0	QF; 25	A 0	A 0	F 31	R32; 1	R32; 1			346	16
8	11	(Argentina) David Nalbandian	QF; 50	QF; 50	R16; 30	QF; 50	R16; 15	R32; 7	A 0	R64; 1	R64; 1	R32; 7	R32; 7	SF; 45	R32; 1	W 35	SF; 22	QF; 12	QF; 8	R16; 3	344	21
9	12	(Argentina) Mariano Puerta	QF; 8	F 140	R128; 1	R64; 7	R16; 5	R16; 5	R16; 15	A 0	R32; 7	QF; 25	R64; 1	R16; 15	R32; 7	W 35	F 24	SF; 22	SF; 15	QF; 8	340	23
Alternates
10	13	(Chile) Fernando González	R32; 15	R32; 15	QF; 50	R32; 15	R16; 15	R32; 7	R16; 15	R64; 1	R32; 7	R64; 1	R16; 15	QF; 25	R32; 1	W 50	W 35	W 35	F 24	QF; 12	338	23

=== Doubles ===
Rk	Name	1	2	3	4	5	6	7	8	9	10	11	12	13	14	Total	Tour
1	(United States) Bob Bryan (United States) Mike Bryan	W 200	F 140	F 140	F 140	W 100	F 70	F 70	F 45	SF; 45	SF; 45	W 40	F 35	W 35	QF; 25	1,130	21
2	(Sweden) Jonas Björkman (Belarus) Max Mirnyi	W 200	F 140	W 100	W 100	W 100	SF; 90	SF; 90	SF; 45	SF; 45	SF; 45	F 35	F 31	SF; 22	R16; 0	1,043	15
3	(Zimbabwe) Wayne Black (Zimbabwe) Kevin Ullyett	W 200	W 100	SF; 90	SF; 90	F 70	F 70	SF; 45	SF; 45	F 28	QF; 25	SF; 22	QF; 8	R16; 0	R16; 0	793	17
4	(The Bahamas) Mark Knowles (Canada) Daniel Nestor	W 100	W 100	SF; 90	F 70	W 50	SF; 45	SF; 45	W 35	F 28	QF; 25	QF; 25	QF; 25	QF; 25	SF; 22	685	19
5	(India) Leander Paes (Serbia and Montenegro) Nenad Zimonjić	W 100	F 70	W 60	QF; 50	QF; 50	SF; 45	F 31	QF; 25	QF; 25	QF; 25	SF; 15	QF; 8	R16; 0	R16; 0	504	19
6	(France) Michaël Llodra (France) Fabrice Santoro	W 100	F 70	QF; 50	SF; 45	SF; 45	SF; 45	W 45	W 35	R16; 15	R32; 15	QF; 11	QF; 10	R64; 0	R16; 0	486	18
7	(Australia) Wayne Arthurs (Australia) Paul Hanley	F 70	QF; 50	SF; 45	W 45	W 35	R16; 30	QF; 25	QF; 25	QF; 25	QF; 25	F 24	SF; 22	SF; 22	SF; 22	441	23
12^{1}	(Australia) Stephen Huss (South Africa) Wesley Moodie	W 200	F 35	QF; 25	R16; 0	R32; 0	R64; 0	R16; 0	R16; 0	R16; 0						270	9

^{1} Huss and Moodie qualified due to winning Wimbledon and a top 20 finish according to the rules
