= 2005 in tennis =

This page covers all the important events in the sport of tennis in 2005. Primarily, it provides the results of notable tournaments throughout the year on both the ATP and WTA Tours, the Davis Cup, and the Fed Cup.

== ITF ==
=== Grand Slam tournaments ===
==== Men's singles ====
Championship	Champion	Finalist	Score in the final
Australian Open	(Russia) Marat Safin	(Australia) Lleyton Hewitt	1–6, 6–3, 6–4, 6–4
French Open	(Spain) Rafael Nadal	(Argentina) Mariano Puerta	6–7^{(6–8)}, 6–3, 6–1, 7–5
Wimbledon	(Switzerland) Roger Federer	(United States) Andy Roddick	6–2, 7–6^{(7–2)}, 6–4
US Open	(Switzerland) Roger Federer	(United States) Andre Agassi	6–3, 2–6, 7–6^{(7–1)}, 6–1

==== Women's singles ====
Championship	Champion	Finalist	Score in the final
Australian Open	(United States) Serena Williams	(United States) Lindsay Davenport	2–6, 6–3, 6–0
French Open	(Belgium) Justine Henin-Hardenne	(France) Mary Pierce	6–1, 6–1
Wimbledon	(United States) Venus Williams	(United States) Lindsay Davenport	4–6, 7–6^{(7–4)}, 9–7
US Open	(Belgium) Kim Clijsters	(France) Mary Pierce	6–3, 6–1

==== Men's doubles ====
Championship	Champions	Finalists	Score in the final
Australian Open	(Zimbabwe) Wayne Black (Zimbabwe) Kevin Ullyett	(United States) Bob Bryan (United States) Mike Bryan	6–4, 6–4
French Open	(Sweden) Jonas Björkman (Belarus) Max Mirnyi	(United States) Bob Bryan (United States) Mike Bryan	2–6, 6–1, 6–4
Wimbledon	(Australia) Stephen Huss (South Africa) Wesley Moodie	(United States) Bob Bryan (United States) Mike Bryan	7–6^{(7–4)}, 6–3, 6–7^{(2–7)}, 6–3
US Open	(United States) Bob Bryan (United States) Mike Bryan	(Sweden) Jonas Björkman (Belarus) Max Mirnyi	6–1, 6–4

==== Women's doubles ====
Championship	Champions	Finalists	Score in the final
Australian Open	(Russia) Svetlana Kuznetsova (Australia) Alicia Molik	(United States) Lindsay Davenport (United States) Corina Morariu	6–3, 6–4
French Open	(Spain) Virginia Ruano (Argentina) Paola Suárez	(Zimbabwe) Cara Black (South Africa) Liezel Huber	4–6, 6–3, 6–3
Wimbledon	(Zimbabwe) Cara Black (South Africa) Liezel Huber	(Russia) Svetlana Kuznetsova (France) Amélie Mauresmo	6–2, 6–1
US Open	(United States) Lisa Raymond (Australia) Samantha Stosur	(Russia) Elena Dementieva (Italy) Flavia Pennetta	6–2, 5–7, 6–3

==== Mixed doubles ====
Championship	Champions	Finalists	Score in the final
Australian Open	(Australia) Samantha Stosur (Australia) Scott Draper	(South Africa) Liezel Huber (Zimbabwe) Kevin Ullyett	6–2, 2–6, [10–6]
French Open	(Slovakia) Daniela Hantuchová (France) Fabrice Santoro	(United States) Martina Navratilova (India) Leander Paes	3–6, 6–3, 6–2
Wimbledon	(France) Mary Pierce (India) Mahesh Bhupathi	(Ukraine) Tatiana Perebiynis (Australia) Paul Hanley	6–4, 6–2
US Open	(Slovakia) Daniela Hantuchová (India) Mahesh Bhupathi	(Slovenia) Katarina Srebotnik (Serbia) Nenad Zimonjić	6–4, 6–2

=== Davis Cup ===
2005 Davis Cup Champions
(Croatia)
Croatia
1st title

Slovakia
2
Sibamac Arena, Bratislava, Slovakia
2–4 December
Hard (indoors)

Croatia
3

			1	2	3	4	5
1	(Slovakia) (Croatia)	Karol Kučera; Ivan Ljubičić	3; 6	4; 6	3; 6
2	(Slovakia) (Croatia)	Dominik Hrbatý; Mario Ančić	7^{7} 6^{5}	6; 4	6^{5} 7^{7}	6; 4
3	(Slovakia) (Croatia)	Dominik Hrbatý / Michal Mertiňák; Mario Ančić / Ivan Ljubičić	6^{5} 7^{7}	3; 6	6^{5} 7^{7}
4	(Slovakia) (Croatia)	Dominik Hrbatý; Ivan Ljubičić	4; 6	6; 3	6; 4	3; 6	6; 4
5	(Slovakia) (Croatia)	Michal Mertiňák; Mario Ančić	6; 7	3; 6	4; 6

=== Fed Cup ===
2005 Fed Cup Champions
(Russia)
Russia
2nd title

France
2
Court Philippe Chatrier, Paris, France
17–18 September
Clay (outdoors)

Russia
3

			1	2	3
1	(France) (Russia)	Mary Pierce; Elena Dementieva	6; 7	6; 2	1; 6
2	(France) (Russia)	Amélie Mauresmo; Anastasia Myskina	6; 4	6; 2
3	(France) (Russia)	Amélie Mauresmo; Elena Dementieva	4; 6	6; 4	2; 6
4	(France) (Russia)	Mary Pierce; Anastasia Myskina	4; 6	6; 4	6; 2
5	(France) (Russia)	Amélie Mauresmo / Mary Pierce; Elena Dementieva / Dinara Safina	4; 6	6; 1	3; 6

=== Hopman Cup ===
2005 Hopman Cup Champions
(Slovakia)
Slovakia
2nd title

Slovakia
2
Burswood Entertainment Complex, Perth, Australia
1–7 January
Hard (indoors)

Argentina
1

			1	2	3
1	(Slovakia) (Argentina)	Daniela Hantuchová; Gisela Dulko	1; 6	6; 4	6; 4
2	(Slovakia) (Argentina)	Dominik Hrbatý; Guillermo Coria	6; 4	6; 1
3	(Slovakia) (Argentina)	Daniela Hantuchová / Dominik Hrbatý; Gisela Dulko / Guillermo Coria				w/o

== ATP/WTA ==
- 2005 ATP calendar
- 2005 WTA calendar

=== Year-end championships ===
==== Men's singles ====
Championship	Champion	Finalist	Score in the final
Shanghai	(Argentina) David Nalbandian	(Switzerland) Roger Federer	6–7^{(4–7)}, 6–7^{(11–13)}, 6–2, 6–1, 7–6^{(7–3)}

==== Women's singles ====
Championship	Champion	Finalist	Score in the final
Los Angeles	(France) Amélie Mauresmo	(France) Mary Pierce	5–7, 7–6^{(7–3)}, 6–4

==== Men's doubles ====
Championship	Champions	Finalists	Score in the final
Shanghai	(France) Michaël Llodra (France) Fabrice Santoro	(India) Leander Paes (Serbia and Montenegro) Nenad Zimonjić	6–7^{(6–8)}, 6–3, 7–6^{(7–4)}

==== Women's doubles ====
Championship	Champions	Finalists	Score in the final
Los Angeles	(United States) Lisa Raymond (Australia) Samantha Stosur	(Zimbabwe) Cara Black (Australia) Rennae Stubbs	6–7^{(5–7)}, 7–5, 6–4

=== Masters Series/Tier I ===
==== Men's singles ====
Championship	Champion	Finalist	Score in the final
Indian Wells	(Switzerland) Roger Federer	(Australia) Lleyton Hewitt	6–2, 6–4, 6–4
Miami	(Switzerland) Roger Federer	(Spain) Rafael Nadal	2–6, 6–7^{(4–7)}, 7–6^{(7–5)}, 6–3, 6–1
Monte Carlo	(Spain) Rafael Nadal	(Argentina) Guillermo Coria	6–3, 6–1, 0–6, 7–5
Rome	(Spain) Rafael Nadal	(Argentina) Guillermo Coria	6–4, 3–6, 6–3, 4–6, 7–6^{(8–6)}
Hamburg	(Switzerland) Roger Federer	(France) Richard Gasquet	6–3, 7–5, 7–6^{(7–4)}
Montreal	(Spain) Rafael Nadal	(United States) Andre Agassi	6–3, 4–6, 6–2
Cincinnati	(Switzerland) Roger Federer	(United States) Andy Roddick	6–3, 7–5
Madrid	(Spain) Rafael Nadal	(Croatia) Ivan Ljubičić	3–6, 2–6, 6–3, 6–4, 7–6^{(7–3)}
Paris	(Czech Republic) Tomáš Berdych	(Croatia) Ivan Ljubičić	6–3, 6–4, 3–6, 4–6, 6–4

==== Women's singles ====
Championship	Champion	Finalist	Score in the final
Tokyo	(Russia) Maria Sharapova	(United States) Lindsay Davenport	6–1, 3–6, 7–6^{(7–5)}
Indian Wells	(Belgium) Kim Clijsters	(United States) Lindsay Davenport	6–4, 4–6, 6–2
Miami	(Belgium) Kim Clijsters	(Russia) Maria Sharapova	6–3, 7–5
Charleston	(Belgium) Justine Henin-Hardenne	(Russia) Elena Dementieva	7–5, 6–4
Berlin	(Belgium) Justine Henin-Hardenne	(Russia) Nadia Petrova	6–3, 4–6, 6–3
Rome	(France) Amélie Mauresmo	(Switzerland) Patty Schnyder	2–6, 6–3, 6–4
San Diego	(France) Mary Pierce	(Japan) Ai Sugiyama	6–0, 6–3
Toronto	(Belgium) Kim Clijsters	(Belgium) Justine Henin-Hardenne	7–5, 6–1
Moscow	(France) Mary Pierce	(Italy) Francesca Schiavone	6–4, 6–3
Zürich	(United States) Lindsay Davenport	(Switzerland) Patty Schnyder	7–6^{(7–5)}, 6–3

==== Men's doubles ====
Championship	Champions	Finalists	Score in the final
Indian Wells	(The Bahamas) Mark Knowles (Canada) Daniel Nestor	(Australia) Wayne Arthurs (Australia) Paul Hanley	7–6^{(8–6)}, 7–6^{(7–2)}
Miami	(Sweden) Jonas Björkman (Belarus) Max Mirnyi	(Zimbabwe) Wayne Black (Zimbabwe) Kevin Ullyett	6–1, 6–2
Monte Carlo	(India) Leander Paes (Serbia and Montenegro) Nenad Zimonjić	(United States) Bob Bryan (United States) Mike Bryan	walkover
Rome	(France) Michaël Llodra (France) Fabrice Santoro	(United States) Bob Bryan (United States) Mike Bryan	6–4, 6–2
Hamburg	(Sweden) Jonas Björkman (Belarus) Max Mirnyi	(France) Michaël Llodra (France) Fabrice Santoro	4–6, 7–6^{(7–2)}, 7–6^{(7–3)}
Montreal	(Zimbabwe) Wayne Black (Zimbabwe) Kevin Ullyett	(Israel) Jonathan Erlich (Israel) Andy Ram	6–7^{(5–7)}, 6–3, 6–0
Cincinnati	(Sweden) Jonas Björkman (Belarus) Max Mirnyi	(Zimbabwe) Wayne Black (Zimbabwe) Kevin Ullyett	7–6^{(7–3)}, 6–2
Madrid	(The Bahamas) Mark Knowles (Canada) Daniel Nestor	(India) Leander Paes (Serbia and Montenegro) Nenad Zimonjić	3–6, 6–3, 6–2
Paris	(United States) Bob Bryan (United States) Mike Bryan	(The Bahamas) Mark Knowles (Canada) Daniel Nestor	6–4, 6–7^{(3–7)}, 6–4

==== Women's doubles ====
Championship	Champions	Finalists	Score in the final
Tokyo	(Slovakia) Janette Husárová (Russia) Elena Likhovtseva	(United States) Lindsay Davenport (United States) Corina Morariu	6–4, 6–3
Indian Wells	(Spain) Virginia Ruano (Argentina) Paola Suárez	(Russia) Nadia Petrova (United States) Meghann Shaughnessy	7–6^{(7–3)}, 6–1
Miami	(Russia) Svetlana Kuznetsova (Australia) Alicia Molik	(United States) Lisa Raymond (Australia) Rennae Stubbs	7–5, 6–7^{(5–7)}, 6–2
Charleston	(Spain) Conchita Martínez (Spain) Virginia Ruano	(Czech Republic) Iveta Benešová (Czech Republic) Květa Peschke	6–1, 6–4
Berlin	(Russia) Elena Likhovtseva (Russia) Vera Zvonareva	(Zimbabwe) Cara Black (Australia) Liezel Huber	4–6, 6–4, 6–3
Rome	(Zimbabwe) Cara Black (South Africa) Liezel Huber	(Russia) Maria Kirilenko (Spain) Anabel Medina	6–0, 4–6, 6–1
San Diego	(Spain) Conchita Martínez (Spain) Virginia Ruano Pascual	(Slovakia) Daniela Hantuchová (Japan) Ai Sugiyama	6–7^{(7–9)}, 6–1, 7–5
Toronto	(Germany) Anna-Lena Grönefeld (United States) Martina Navratilova	(Spain) Conchita Martínez (Spain) Virginia Ruano	5–7, 6–3, 6–4
Moscow	(United States) Lisa Raymond (Australia) Samantha Stosur	(Zimbabwe) Cara Black (Australia) Rennae Stubbs	6–2, 6–4
Zürich	(Zimbabwe) Cara Black (Australia) Rennae Stubbs	(Slovakia) Daniela Hantuchová (Japan) Ai Sugiyama	6–7^{(6–8)}, 7–6^{(7–4)}, 6–3

=== Other competitions ===
==== ATP World Team Championship ====
2005 World Team Cup Champions
(Germany)
Germany
4th title

Argentina
1
Rochusclub, Düsseldorf, Germany
15–21 May
Clay (outdoors)

Germany
2

			1	2	3
1	(Argentina) (Germany)	Guillermo Coria; Florian Mayer	6; 1	6; 1
2	(Argentina) (Germany)	Gastón Gaudio; Tommy Haas	4; 6	3; 6
3	(Argentina) (Germany)	Guillermo Cañas / Guillermo Coria; Tommy Haas / Alexander Waske	1; 6	2; 6

=== Year-end top 10 ===
==== Men – Entry Ranking ====
Full List

#	Player	Points
1	(Switzerland) Roger Federer	6,725
2	(Spain) Rafael Nadal	4,765
3	(United States) Andy Roddick	3,085
4	(Australia) Lleyton Hewitt	2,490
5	(Russia) Nikolay Davydenko	2,390
6	(Argentina) David Nalbandian	2,370
7	(United States) Andre Agassi	2,275
8	(Argentina) Guillermo Coria	2,190
9	(Croatia) Ivan Ljubičić	2,180
10	(Argentina) Gastón Gaudio	2,050

==== Men – Indesit ATP Race ====
#	Player	Points
1	(Switzerland) Roger Federer	1,345
2	(Spain) Rafael Nadal	953
3	(United States) Andy Roddick	617
4	(Australia) Lleyton Hewitt	498
5	(Russia) Nikolay Davydenko	478
6	(Argentina) David Nalbandian	474
7	(United States) Andre Agassi	455
8	(Argentina) Guillermo Coria	438
9	(Croatia) Ivan Ljubičić	436
10	(Argentina) Gastón Gaudio	410

==== Women – Entry ranking ====
Full List

#	Player	Points
1	(United States) Lindsay Davenport	4,910
2	(Belgium) Kim Clijsters	4,829
3	(France) Amélie Mauresmo	4,030
4	(Russia) Maria Sharapova	3,958
5	(France) Mary Pierce	3,797
6	(Belgium) Justine Henin-Hardenne	2,936
7	(Switzerland) Patty Schnyder	2,774
8	(Russia) Elena Dementieva	2,748
9	(Russia) Nadia Petrova	2,638
10	(United States) Venus Williams	2,628

== Tennis Hall of Fame ==
Class	Inductees	Category
Class of 2005	(United States) Butch Buchholz	Contributor
Class of 2005	(United States) Jim Courier	Player
Class of 2005	(France) Yannick Noah	Player
Class of 2005	(Czech Republic) Jana Novotná	Player
