= 2005 WTA Tier I Series =

Women's professional tennis tour

Details
- Duration: January 31 – October 23
- Edition: 16th
- Tournaments: 10

Achievements (singles)
- Most titles: (Belgium) Kim Clijsters (3)
- Most finals: (Belgium) Kim Clijsters (United States) Lindsay Davenport (Belgium) Justine Henin (3)

The WTA Tier I events are part of the elite tour for professional women's tennis organised by the WTA called the WTA Tour.

== Tournaments ==
Tournament	Country	Location	Surface	Date	Prize money
Toray Pan Pacific Open	Japan	Tokyo	Carpet (i)	Jan 31 – Feb 6	$1,300,000
Pacific Life Open	United States	Indian Wells	Hard	Mar 7 – 20	$2,100,000
NASDAQ-100 Open	United States	Key Biscayne	Hard	Mar 21 – Apr 3	$3,115,000
Family Circle Cup	United States	Charleston	Clay (green)	Apr 11 – 17	$1,300,000
Qatar Total German Open	Germany	Berlin	Clay	May 2 – 8	$1,300,000
Telecom Italia Masters Rome	Italy	Rome	Clay	May 9 – 15	$1,300,000
Acura Classic	United States	San Diego	Hard	Aug 1 – 7	$1,300,000
Rogers Cup	Canada	Toronto	Hard	Aug 15 – 21	$1,300,000
Kremlin Cup	Russia	Moscow	Carpet (i)	Oct 10 – 16	$1,340,000
Zurich Open	Switzerland	Zürich	Hard (i)	Oct 17 – 23	$1,340,000

== Results ==
* First-time champion

Tournament	Singles champions	Runners-up	Score	Doubles champions	Runners-up	Score
Tokyo Singles – Doubles	(Russia) Maria Sharapova*	(United States) Lindsay Davenport	6–1, 3–6, 7–6^{(7–5)}	(Slovakia) Janette Husárová (Russia) Elena Likhovtseva	(United States) Lindsay Davenport (United States) Corina Morariu	6–4, 6–3
Indian Wells Singles – Doubles	(Belgium) Kim Clijsters	(United States) Lindsay Davenport	6–4, 4–6, 6–2	(Spain) Virginia Ruano Pascual (Argentina) Paola Suárez	(Russia) Nadia Petrova (United States) Meghann Shaughnessy	7–6^{(7–3)}, 6–1
Miami Singles – Doubles	(Belgium) Kim Clijsters (2)	(Russia) Maria Sharapova	7–5, 6–3	(Russia) Svetlana Kuznetsova	(United States) Lisa Raymond (Australia) Rennae Stubbs	7–5, 6–7^{(5–7)}, 6–2
Miami Singles – Doubles	(Belgium) Kim Clijsters (2)	(Russia) Maria Sharapova	7–5, 6–3	(Australia) Alicia Molik*	(United States) Lisa Raymond (Australia) Rennae Stubbs	7–5, 6–7^{(5–7)}, 6–2
Charleston Singles – Doubles	(Belgium) Justine Henin	(Russia) Elena Dementieva	7–5, 6–4	(Spain) Conchita Martínez (Spain) Virginia Ruano Pascual (2)	(Czech Republic) Iveta Benešová (Czech Republic) Květa Peschke	6–1, 6–4
Berlin Singles – Doubles	(Belgium) Justine Henin (2)	(Russia) Nadia Petrova	6–3, 4–6, 6–3	(Russia) Elena Likhovtseva (2) (Russia) Vera Zvonareva	(Zimbabwe) Cara Black (South Africa) Liezel Huber	4–6, 6–4, 6–3
Rome Singles – Doubles	(France) Amélie Mauresmo	(Switzerland) Patty Schnyder	2–6, 6–3, 6–4	(Zimbabwe) Cara Black (South Africa) Liezel Huber	(Russia) Maria Kirilenko (Spain) Anabel Medina Garrigues	6–0, 4–6, 6–1
San Diego Singles – Doubles	(France) Mary Pierce	(Japan) Ai Sugiyama	6–3, 6–0	(Spain) Conchita Martínez (2) (Spain) Virginia Ruano Pascual (3)	(Slovakia) Daniela Hantuchová (Japan) Ai Sugiyama	6–7^{(7–9)}, 6–1, 7–5
Toronto Singles – Doubles	(Belgium) Kim Clijsters (3)	(Belgium) Justine Henin	7–5, 6–1	(Germany) Anna-Lena Grönefeld*	(Spain) Conchita Martínez (Spain) Virginia Ruano Pascual	5–7, 6–3, 6–4
Toronto Singles – Doubles	(Belgium) Kim Clijsters (3)	(Belgium) Justine Henin	7–5, 6–1	(United States) Martina Navratilova	(Spain) Conchita Martínez (Spain) Virginia Ruano Pascual	5–7, 6–3, 6–4
Moscow Singles – Doubles	(France) Mary Pierce (2)	(Italy) Francesca Schiavone	6–4, 6–3	(United States) Lisa Raymond	(Zimbabwe) Cara Black (Australia) Rennae Stubbs	6–2, 6–4
Moscow Singles – Doubles	(France) Mary Pierce (2)	(Italy) Francesca Schiavone	6–4, 6–3	(Australia) Samantha Stosur*	(Zimbabwe) Cara Black (Australia) Rennae Stubbs	6–2, 6–4
Zürich Singles – Doubles	(United States) Lindsay Davenport	(Switzerland) Patty Schnyder	7–6, 6–3	(Zimbabwe) Cara Black (2) (Australia) Rennae Stubbs	(Slovakia) Daniela Hantuchová (Japan) Ai Sugiyama	6–7^{(6–8)}, 7–6^{(7–4)}, 6–3

== See also ==
- WTA Tier I events
- 2005 WTA Tour
- 2005 ATP Masters Series
- 2005 ATP Tour
