= 2006 BNP Paribas Masters – Singles =

Singles
- 2006 BNP Paribas Masters

Final
- Champion: (Russia) Nikolay Davydenko
- Runner-up: (Slovakia) Dominik Hrbatý
- Score: 6–1, 6–2, 6–2

Details
- Draw: 48 (6 Q / 3 WC)
- Seeds: 16

Events
Singles	Doubles
← 2005 ·	BNP Paribas Masters	· 2007 →

Nikolay Davydenko defeated Dominik Hrbatý in the final, 6–1, 6–2, 6–2 to win the singles tennis title at the 2006 Paris Masters.

Tomáš Berdych was the defending champion, but lost to Hrbatý in the quarterfinals.

== Seeds ==
A champion seed is indicated in bold text while text in italics indicates the round in which that seed was eliminated. All sixteen seeds received a bye into the second round.

1. (Switzerland) ~~Roger Federer~~ (withdrew)
2. (Spain) ~~Rafael Nadal~~ (withdrew)
3. (Argentina) ~~David Nalbandian~~ (withdrew)
4. (Russia) **Nikolay Davydenko (champion)**
5. (Chile) Fernando González (second round)
6. (Spain) Tommy Robredo (semifinals)
7. (United States) James Blake (third round)
8. (Czech Republic) Tomáš Berdych (quarterfinals)
9. (Croatia) Mario Ančić (quarterfinals)
10. (Germany) Tommy Haas (semifinals, retired)
11. (Spain) David Ferrer (second round)
12. (Serbia) Novak Djokovic (second round)
13. (United Kingdom) Andy Murray (third round)
14. (Finland) Jarkko Nieminen (quarterfinals)
15. (Russia) Dmitry Tursunov (third round)
16. (France) Richard Gasquet (third round, withdrew)
17. (Slovakia) Dominik Hrbatý (final)
18. (Sweden) Robin Söderling (second round)

== Draw ==
=== Key ===
- Q = Qualifier
- WC = Wild card
- LL = Lucky loser
- Alt = Alternate
- SE = Special exempt
- PR = Protected ranking
- ITF = ITF entry
- JE = Junior exempt
- w/o = Walkover
- r = Retired
- d = Defaulted
- SR = Special ranking

=== Finals ===
Quarterfinals
14	(Finland) Jarkko Nieminen	**7^{7}**	6^{4}	4
6	**(Spain) Tommy Robredo**	6^{4}	**7^{7}**	**6**
4	**(Russia) Nikolay Davydenko**	**6**	**6**
9	(Croatia) Mario Ančić	3	3
8	(Czech Republic) Tomáš Berdych	4	**6**	2
17	**(Slovakia) Dominik Hrbatý**	**6**	1	**6**
10	**(Germany) Tommy Haas**	**7^{7}**	3	**6**
(Russia) Marat Safin	6^{1}	**6**	3

Semifinals
6	(Spain) Tommy Robredo	3	**7**	2
4	**(Russia) Nikolay Davydenko**	**6**	5	**6**
17	**(Slovakia) Dominik Hrbatý**	**6**	1
10	(Germany) Tommy Haas	4	0^{r}

Final
4	**(Russia) Nikolay Davydenko**	**6**	**6**	**6**
17	(Slovakia) Dominik Hrbatý	1	2	2

=== Top half ===
==== Section 1 ====
First round
(Sweden) **T Johansson**	**7^{7}**	**7^{7}**
Q	(United States) V Spadea	6^{4}	6^{1}
(France) G Simon	3	4
Q	(Italy) **D Bracciali**	**6**	**6**
Q	(Italy) A Seppi	2	4
(France) **P-H Mathieu**	**6**	**6**
(Belgium) X Malisse	1	6^{7}
(France) **S Grosjean**	**6**	**7^{9}**

Second round
LL	(Russia) **T Gabashvili**	**7^{7}**	4	**6**
(Sweden) T Johansson	6^{3}	**6**	3
Q	(Italy) D Bracciali	3	4
14	(Finland) **J Nieminen**	**6**	**6**
12	(Serbia) N Djokovic	6^{11}	6^{4}
(France) **P-H Mathieu**	**7^{13}**	**7^{7}**
(France) S Grosjean	**6**	5	4
6	(Spain) **T Robredo**	3	**7**	**6**

Third round
LL	(Russia) T Gabashvili	**6**	6^{6}	2
14	(Finland) **J Nieminen**	4	**7^{8}**	**6**
(France) P-H Mathieu	4	6^{1}
6	(Spain) **T Robredo**	**6**	**7^{7}**

Quarterfinals
14	(Finland) J Nieminen	**7^{7}**	6^{4}	4
6	(Spain) **T Robredo**	6^{4}	**7^{7}**	**6**

==== Section 2 ====
First round
LL	(Belgium) **C Rochus**	4	**7^{7}**	**6**
(Argentina) J Acasuso	**6**	6^{4}	4
(Spain) **N Almagro**	6^{4}	**7^{9}**	**7^{7}**
(Sweden) J Björkman	**7^{7}**	6^{7}	6^{2}
(Belgium) **K Vliegen**	3	**6**	**7^{7}**
WC	(France) F Serra	**6**	3	6^{4}
(France) **J Benneteau**	5	**6**	**7^{7}**
(France) F Santoro	**7**	3	6^{5}

Second round
4	(Russia) **N Davydenko**	**6**	**6**
LL	(Belgium) C Rochus	0	0
(Spain) N Almagro	3	4^{r}
15	(Russia) **D Tursunov**	**6**	5
9	(Croatia) **M Ančić**	3	**7^{7}**	**6**
(Belgium) K Vliegen	**6**	6^{4}	3
(France) **J Benneteau**	3	**6**	**7**
5	(Chile) F González	**6**	4	5

Third round
4	(Russia) **N Davydenko**	**6**	**6**
15	(Russia) D Tursunov	2	2
9	(Croatia) **M Ančić**	**6**	**6**
(France) J Benneteau	3	1

Quarterfinals
4	(Russia) **N Davydenko**	**6**	**6**
9	(Croatia) M Ančić	3	3

=== Bottom half ===
==== Section 3 ====
First round
(Belgium) **O Rochus**	**6**	**7**
Q	(Serbia) J Tipsarević	4	5
(United States) **R Ginepri**	**6**	5	**6**
Q	(Belarus) M Mirnyi	4	**7**	2
(Argentina) **J I Chela**	**6**	3
(Thailand) P Srichaphan	3	0^{r}
(Russia) **I Andreev**	**7**	**6**
(France) G Monfils	5	4

Second round
8	(Czech Republic) **T Berdych**	6^{4}	**6**	**6**
(Belgium) O Rochus	**7^{7}**	4	2
(United States) **R Ginepri**	**6**	**6**
11	(Spain) D Ferrer	3	4
13	(United Kingdom) **A Murray**	**7**	**6**
(Argentina) J I Chela	5	0
(Russia) I Andreev	4	3
17	(Slovakia) **D Hrbatý**	**6**	**6**

Third round
8	(Czech Republic) **T Berdych**	**6**	**6**
(United States) R Ginepri	3	3
13	(United Kingdom) A Murray	6^{6}	0
17	(Slovakia) **D Hrbatý**	**7^{8}**	**6**

Quarterfinals
8	(Czech Republic) T Berdych	4	**6**	2
17	(Slovakia) **D Hrbatý**	**6**	1	**6**

==== Section 4 ====
First round
(France) **A Clément**	**6**	**6**
(Chile) N Massú	1	4
(Spain) F Verdasco	4	6^{4}
Q	(France) **M Llodra**	**6**	**7^{7}**
WC	(France) M Gicquel	6^{6}	**7^{7}**	6^{2}
(Switzerland) **S Wawrinka**	**7^{8}**	6^{4}	**7^{7}**
(Russia) **M Safin**	**6**	**7^{7}**
WC	(France) N Mahut	1	6^{5}

Second round
7	(United States) **J Blake**	**6**	3	**6**
(France) A Clément	4	**6**	4
Q	(France) M Llodra	6^{7}	6^{2}
10	(Germany) **T Haas**	**7^{9}**	**7^{7}**
16	(France) **R Gasquet**	**7**	**6**
(Switzerland) S Wawrinka	5	1
(Russia) **M Safin**	3	**6**	**6**
18	(Sweden) R Söderling	**6**	3	4

Third round
7	(United States) J Blake	4	2
10	(Germany) **T Haas**	**6**	**6**
16	(France) R Gasquet
(Russia) **M Safin**	w/o

Quarterfinals
10	(Germany) **T Haas**	**7^{7}**	3	**6**
(Russia) M Safin	6^{1}	**6**	3
