= 2005 If Stockholm Open – Doubles =

Doubles
- 2005 If Stockholm Open

Final
- Champions: (Australia) Wayne Arthurs (Australia) Paul Hanley
- Runners-up: (India) Leander Paes (Serbia and Montenegro) Nenad Zimonjić
- Score: 5–3, 5–3

Events
| Singles | Doubles |
| ← 2004 · | If Stockholm Open | · 2006 → |

Feliciano López and Fernando Verdasco were the defending champions, but did not participate this year.

Wayne Arthurs and Paul Hanley won the title, defeating Leander Paes and Nenad Zimonjić 5–3, 5–3 in the final.

== Seeds ==
1. (India) Leander Paes / (Serbia and Montenegro) Nenad Zimonjić (final)
2. (Australia) Wayne Arthurs / (Australia) Paul Hanley (champions)
3. (Sweden) Simon Aspelin / (Australia) Todd Perry (semifinals, withdrew)
4. (Australia) Stephen Huss / (South Africa) Wesley Moodie (first round)

== Draw ==
=== Key ===
- Q = Qualifier
- WC = Wild card
- LL = Lucky loser
- Alt = Alternate
- SE = Special exempt
- PR = Protected ranking
- ITF = ITF entry
- JE = Junior exempt
- w/o = Walkover
- r = Retired
- d = Defaulted
- SR = Special ranking

=== Draw ===
First round
1 | (India) L Paes (Serbia and Montenegro) N Zimonjić | 1 | 5 | 5
(Argentina) JI Chela (Chile) N Massú | 5 | 2 | 2
(Argentina) J Acasuso (Spain) D Ferrer | 3 | 5 | 1
(Zimbabwe) W Black (South Africa) C Haggard | 5 | 3 | 5
3 | (Sweden) S Aspelin (Australia) T Perry | 5 | 5^{9}
(Belgium) C Rochus (Belgium) O Rochus | 1 | 4^{7}
(France) P-H Mathieu (France) G Monfils | 1 | 0
WC | (Sweden) E Eleskovic (Sweden) J Landsberg | 5 | 5
(Germany) M Kohlmann (Germany) A Waske | 3 | 4^{3}
(Argentina) M García (Argentina) S Prieto | 5 | 5^{7}
(Sweden) J Björkman (Sweden) T Johansson | 5 | 5
4 | (Australia) S Huss (South Africa) W Moodie | 3 | 3
(Switzerland) Y Allegro (United States) G Oliver | 3 | 4^{3}
WC | (Slovakia) K Beck (Sweden) R Lindstedt | 5 | 5^{7}
(Italy) D Sanguinetti (United States) V Spadea | 2 | 4^{7}
2 | (Australia) W Arthurs (Australia) P Hanley | 5 | 5^{9}

Quarterfinals
1 | (India) L Paes (Serbia and Montenegro) N Zimonjić | 5^{10} | 2 | 5
(Zimbabwe) W Black (South Africa) C Haggard | 4^{8} | 5 | 2
3 | (Sweden) S Aspelin (Australia) T Perry | 5 | 2 | 5
WC | (Sweden) E Eleskovic (Sweden) J Landsberg | 3 | 5 | 1
(Argentina) M García (Argentina) S Prieto | 3 | 2
(Sweden) J Björkman (Sweden) T Johansson | 5 | 5
WC | (Slovakia) K Beck (Sweden) R Lindstedt | 3 | 5^{7} | 1
2 | (Australia) W Arthurs (Australia) P Hanley | 5 | 4^{3} | 5

Semifinals
1 | (India) L Paes (Serbia and Montenegro) N Zimonjić | w/o
3 | (Sweden) S Aspelin (Australia) T Perry
(Sweden) J Björkman (Sweden) T Johansson | 5^{14} | 4^{2} | 3
2 | (Australia) W Arthurs (Australia) P Hanley | 4^{12} | 5^{7} | 5

Final
1 | (India) L Paes (Serbia and Montenegro) N Zimonjić | 3 | 3
2 | (Australia) W Arthurs (Australia) P Hanley | 5 | 5
