= 2005 BA-CA-TennisTrophy – Singles =

Singles
- 2005 BA-CA-TennisTrophy

Final
- Champion: (Croatia) Ivan Ljubičić
- Runner-up: (Spain) Juan Carlos Ferrero
- Score: 6–2, 6–4, 7–6^{(7–5)}

Details
- Draw: 32
- Seeds: 8

Events
Singles	Doubles
- Vienna Open

Feliciano López was the defending champion but lost to Radek Štěpánek in the quarterfinals.

Ivan Ljubičić won the title defeating Juan Carlos Ferrero 6–2, 6–4, 7–6^{(7–5)} in the final.

== Seeds ==
1. (Argentina) David Nalbandian (quarterfinals)
2. (Argentina) Gastón Gaudio (first round)
3. (Czech Republic) Radek Štěpánek (semifinals)
4. (Croatia) Ivan Ljubičić (champion)
5. (Spain) Tommy Robredo (semifinals)
6. (Chile) Fernando González (quarterfinals)
7. (Spain) Juan Carlos Ferrero (final)
8. (Spain) Feliciano López (quarterfinals)

== Draw ==
Key

- Q = Qualifier
- WC = Wild card
- LL = Lucky loser
- Alt = Alternate
- ITF = ITF entry
- PR = Protected ranking
- SR = Special ranking
- SE = Special exempt
- JE = Junior exempt
- JR = Junior Accelerator Programme entrant
- CO = College Accelerator Programme entrant
- NG = Next Gen Accelerator Program entrant
- w/o = Walkover
- r = Retired
- d = Defaulted

=== Finals ===
Semifinals
7	(Spain) Juan Carlos Ferrero	7^{7}	6
3	(Czech Republic) Radek Štěpánek	6^{3}	3
4	(Croatia) Ivan Ljubičić	7^{7}	6
5	(Spain) Tommy Robredo	6^{5}	4

Final
7	(Spain) Juan Carlos Ferrero	2	4	6^{5}
4	(Croatia) Ivan Ljubičić	6	6	7^{7}

=== Top half ===
First round
1	(Argentina) D Nalbandian	6	6^{9}	6
(France) S Grosjean	4	7^{11}	3
Q	(Austria) R Eitzinger	7^{8}	6
Q	(Spain) N Almagro	6^{6}	2
(Ecuador) N Lapentti	7	7^{8}
(Italy) A Seppi	5	6^{6}
(Switzerland) S Wawrinka	6	2	3
7	(Spain) JC Ferrero	3	6	6
3	(Czech Republic) R Štěpánek	6^{2}	6	6
(Peru) L Horna	7^{7}	0	3
WC	(United Kingdom) T Henman	7	6
Q	(France) A Dupuis	5	3
(Czech Republic) J Novák	4	3
WC	(Austria) O Marach	6	6
WC	(Austria) A Peya	3	6	2
8	(Spain) F López	6	3	6

Second round
1	(Argentina) D Nalbandian	6	7
Q	(Austria) R Eitzinger	1	5
(Ecuador) N Lapentti	4	4
7	(Spain) JC Ferrero	6	6
3	(Czech Republic) R Štěpánek	6^{2}	7^{7}	6
WC	(United Kingdom) T Henman	7^{7}	6^{3}	1
WC	(Austria) O Marach	4	7^{7}	5
8	(Spain) F López	6	6^{5}	7

Quarterfinals
1	(Argentina) D Nalbandian	6^{5}	3
7	(Spain) JC Ferrero	7^{7}	6
3	(Czech Republic) R Štěpánek	7^{10}	7^{7}
8	(Spain) F López	6^{8}	6^{5}

Semifinals
7	(Spain) JC Ferrero	7^{7}	6
3	(Czech Republic) R Štěpánek	6^{3}	3

=== Bottom half ===
First round
6	(Chile) F González	6	6
(Czech Republic) T Berdych	2	2
SE	(Germany) B Phau	5	4
(Spain) C Moyá	7	6
(Germany) T Haas	6	6
(Czech Republic) T Zíb	4	3
(Argentina) A Calleri	4	3
4	(Croatia) I Ljubičić	6	6
5	(Spain) T Robredo	7	3	6
(Brazil) R Mello	5	6	2
(Czech Republic) I Minář	7^{7}	6
(United States) K Kim	6^{0}	3
(Austria) S Koubek	6	6^{5}	3
Q	(France) J-R Lisnard	4	7^{7}	6
(Austria) J Melzer	6^{4}	6	7^{7}
2	(Argentina) G Gaudio	7^{7}	3	6^{5}

Second round
6	(Chile) F González	6	7
(Spain) C Moyá	4	5
(Germany) T Haas	3	4
4	(Croatia) I Ljubičić	6	6
5	(Spain) T Robredo	7^{7}	6
(Czech Republic) I Minář	6^{4}	4
Q	(France) J-R Lisnard	5	6	7^{7}
(Austria) J Melzer	7	2	6^{4}

Quarterfinals
6	(Chile) F González	3	5
4	(Croatia) I Ljubičić	6	7
5	(Spain) T Robredo	6	6
Q	(France) J-R Lisnard	1	1

Semifinals
4	(Croatia) I Ljubičić	7^{7}	6
5	(Spain) T Robredo	6^{5}	4
