= 2006 BNP Paribas Masters – Doubles =

Doubles
- 2006 BNP Paribas Masters

Final
- Champions: (France) Arnaud Clément (France) Michaël Llodra
- Runners-up: (France) Fabrice Santoro (Serbia) Nenad Zimonjić
- Score: 7–6^{(7–4)}, 6–2

Details
- Draw: 16
- Seeds: 4

Events
Singles	Doubles
← 2005 ·	BNP Paribas Masters	· 2007 →

Bob Bryan and Mike Bryan were the defending champions, but lost in the semifinals this year.

Arnaud Clément and Michaël Llodra won in the final 7–6^{(7–4)}, 6–2, against Fabrice Santoro and Nenad Zimonjić.

== Seeds ==
1. (United States) Bob Bryan / (United States) Mike Bryan (semifinals)
2. (Sweden) Jonas Björkman / (Belarus) Max Mirnyi (semifinals)
3. (The Bahamas) Mark Knowles / (Canada) Daniel Nestor (quarterfinals)
4. (Australia) Paul Hanley / (Zimbabwe) Kevin Ullyett (first round)

== Draw ==
=== Key ===
- Q = Qualifier
- WC = Wild card
- LL = Lucky loser
- Alt = Alternate
- SE = Special exempt
- PR = Protected ranking
- ITF = ITF entry
- JE = Junior exempt
- w/o = Walkover
- r = Retired
- d = Defaulted
- SR = Special ranking

=== Draw ===
First round
1	(United States) B Bryan (United States) M Bryan	6	6
(Spain) T Robredo (Spain) F Verdasco	3	1
WC	(France) R Gasquet (France) S Grosjean	6	6
(Czech Republic) T Berdych (Czech Republic) J Levinský	4	3
4	(Australia) P Hanley (Zimbabwe) K Ullyett	6	5	[4]
(France) F Santoro (Serbia) N Zimonjić	4	7	[10]
(Israel) J Erlich (Israel) A Ram	2	5
(Poland) M Fyrstenberg (Poland) M Matkowski	6	7
WC	(France) A Clément (France) M Llodra	6	7^{7}
(Sweden) S Aspelin (Australia) T Perry	3	6^{3}
(Austria) J Knowle (Austria) J Melzer	6	5	[6]
3	(The Bahamas) M Knowles (Canada) D Nestor	4	7	[10]
(Russia) M Safin (Russia) D Tursunov	2	1
(Czech Republic) L Dlouhý (Czech Republic) P Vízner	6	6
(Czech Republic) F Čermák (Czech Republic) M Damm	6	6^{6}	[13]
2	(Sweden) J Björkman (Belarus) M Mirnyi	2	7^{8}	[15]

Quarterfinals
1	(United States) B Bryan (United States) M Bryan	w/o
WC	(France) R Gasquet (France) S Grosjean
(France) F Santoro (Serbia) N Zimonjić	6	3	[10]
(Poland) M Fyrstenberg (Poland) M Matkowski	1	6	[8]
WC	(France) A Clément (France) M Llodra	4	6	[12]
3	(The Bahamas) M Knowles (Canada) D Nestor	6	1	[10]
(Czech Republic) L Dlouhý (Czech Republic) P Vízner	3	4
2	(Sweden) J Björkman (Belarus) M Mirnyi	6	6

Semifinals
1	(United States) B Bryan (United States) M Bryan	7	5	[6]
(France) F Santoro (Serbia) N Zimonjić	5	7	[10]
WC	(France) A Clément (France) M Llodra	6	6
2	(Sweden) J Björkman (Belarus) M Mirnyi	3	4

Final
(France) F Santoro (Serbia) N Zimonjić	6^{4}	2
WC	(France) A Clément (France) M Llodra	7^{7}	6
