= 2005 If Stockholm Open – Singles =

Singles
- 2005 If Stockholm Open

Final
- Champion: (United States) James Blake
- Runner-up: (Thailand) Paradorn Srichaphan
- Score: 6–1, 7–6^{(8–6)}

Details
- Draw: 32
- Seeds: 8

Events
Singles	Doubles
← 2004 ·	If Stockholm Open	· 2006 →

Thomas Johansson was the defending champion, but lost in the quarterfinals this year.

James Blake won the tournament, beating Paradorn Srichaphan in the final, 6–1, 7–6^{(8–6)}.

== Seeds ==
1. (Sweden) Thomas Johansson (quarterfinals)
2. (Spain) David Ferrer (first round)
3. (United States) Taylor Dent (first round)
4. (Croatia) Mario Ančić (second round)
5. (Belgium) Olivier Rochus (final)
6. (United States) James Blake (champion)
7. (Finland) Jarkko Nieminen (second round, retired)
8. (Spain) Fernando Verdasco (first round)

== Draw ==
=== Key ===
- Q = Qualifier
- WC = Wild card
- LL = Lucky loser
- Alt = Alternate
- SE = Special exempt
- PR = Protected ranking
- ITF = ITF entry
- JE = Junior exempt
- w/o = Walkover
- r = Retired
- d = Defaulted
- SR = Special ranking

=== Finals ===
Semifinals
(Thailand) Paradorn Srichaphan	4	6	7
(Italy) Davide Sanguinetti	6	5	3
5	(Belgium) Olivier Rochus	4	3
6	(United States) James Blake	6	6

Final
(Thailand) Paradorn Srichaphan	1	6^{6}
6	(United States) James Blake	6	7^{8}

=== Top half ===
First round
1	(Sweden) T Johansson	7^{7}	7^{7}
WC	(Sweden) E Eleskovic	6^{4}	6
(Argentina) JI Chela	2	6	1
(United States) V Spadea	6	4	6
(Germany) T Behrend	5	4
LL	(Germany) A Waske	7	6
(Thailand) P Srichaphan	7^{7}	6
8	(Spain) F Verdasco	6^{4}	3
3	(United States) T Dent	6	4	4
(Italy) D Sanguinetti	2	6	6
Q	(Czech Republic) T Cakl	4	5
Q	(Switzerland) G Bastl	6	7
WC	(Sweden) T Enqvist	4	3
Q	(Germany) R Schüttler	6	6
(Chile) N Massú	6^{1}	2
7	(Finland) J Nieminen	7^{7}	6

Second round
1	(Sweden) T Johansson	6	6
(United States) V Spadea	3	4
LL	(Germany) A Waske	3	2
(Thailand) P Srichaphan	6	6
(Italy) D Sanguinetti	5	6	6
Q	(Switzerland) G Bastl	7	4	4
Q	(Germany) R Schüttler	6	3
7	(Finland) J Nieminen	3	0^{r}

Quarterfinals
1	(Sweden) T Johansson	6	1	4
(Thailand) P Srichaphan	2	6	6
(Italy) D Sanguinetti	6	6
Q	(Germany) R Schüttler	4	3

Semifinals
(Thailand) P Srichaphan	4	7	6
(Italy) D Sanguinetti	6	5	3

=== Bottom half ===
First round
5	(Belgium) O Rochus	6	6
Q	(Canada) F Niemeyer	2	4
(France) P-H Mathieu	1	3
LL	(France) J Benneteau	6	6
SE	(South Africa) W Moodie	4	2
WC	(Sweden) J Björkman	6	6
(Slovakia) K Beck	6^{2}	4
4	(Croatia) M Ančić	7^{7}	6
6	(United States) J Blake	7^{7}	6
(Spain) G García López	6^{4}	4
(Argentina) J Acasuso	3	7^{7}	2
(Belgium) C Rochus	6	6^{4}	6
(Belgium) X Malisse	7^{7}	7
(Argentina) J Mónaco	6^{3}	5
(Spain) A Martín	2	6	6
2	(Spain) D Ferrer	6	3	2

Second round
5	(Belgium) O Rochus	6	6
LL	(France) J Benneteau	4	2
WC	(Sweden) J Björkman	7	7^{9}
4	(Croatia) M Ančić	5	6^{7}
6	(United States) J Blake	6^{9}	7	6
(Belgium) C Rochus	7^{11}	5	2
(Belgium) X Malisse	6	3	6^{4}
(Spain) A Martín	3	6	7^{7}

Quarterfinals
5	(Belgium) O Rochus	1	7^{7}	6
WC	(Sweden) J Björkman	6	6^{3}	2
6	(United States) J Blake	6	6
(Spain) A Martín	1	2

Semifinals
5	(Belgium) O Rochus	4	3
6	(United States) J Blake	6	6
