= 2005 BA-CA-TennisTrophy – Doubles =

Doubles
- 2005 BA-CA-TennisTrophy

Final
- Champions: (The Bahamas) Mark Knowles (Canada) Daniel Nestor
- Runners-up: (Israel) Jonathan Erlich (Israel) Andy Ram
- Score: 5–3, 5–4^{(7–4)}

Details
- Draw: 16
- Seeds: 4

Events
Singles	Doubles
- Vienna Open

Martin Damm and Cyril Suk were the defending champions, but Damm did not participate this year. Suk partnered Pavel Vízner, losing in the semifinals.

Mark Knowles and Daniel Nestor won the title, defeating Jonathan Erlich and Andy Ram 5–3, 5–4^{(7–4)} in the final.

== Seeds ==
1. (The Bahamas) Mark Knowles / (Canada) Daniel Nestor (champions)
2. (Israel) Jonathan Erlich / (Israel) Andy Ram (final)
3. (Czech Republic) Cyril Suk / (Czech Republic) Pavel Vízner (semifinals)
4. (Argentina) Gastón Etlis / (Argentina) Martín Rodríguez (semifinals)

== Draw ==
Key

- Q = Qualifier
- WC = Wild card
- LL = Lucky loser
- Alt = Alternate
- ITF = ITF entry
- PR = Protected ranking
- SR = Special ranking
- SE = Special exempt
- JE = Junior exempt
- JR = Junior Accelerator Programme entrant
- CO = College Accelerator Programme entrant
- NG = Next Gen Accelerator Program entrant
- w/o = Walkover
- r = Retired
- d = Defaulted

=== Draw ===
First round
1	(The Bahamas) M Knowles (Canada) D Nestor	5	2	5
WC	(Austria) S Koubek (Austria) A Peya	2	5	2
(Spain) N Almagro (Spain) T Robredo	5	5^{7}
WC	(Austria) O Marach (Austria) T Muster	2	4^{3}
3	(Czech Republic) C Suk (Czech Republic) P Vízner	5	5^{10}
(Czech Republic) T Berdych (Czech Republic) P Pála	3	4^{8}
(Ecuador) N Lapentti (Spain) F López	5	5
(Czech Republic) J Novák (Czech Republic) D Škoch	3	2
(Argentina) A Calleri (Chile) F González	5	4^{5}	5
(Austria) J Knowle (Austria) J Melzer	1	5^{7}	2
(Czech Republic) L Friedl (Czech Republic) T Zíb	4^{5}	5^{9}	4^{1}
4	(Argentina) G Etlis (Argentina) M Rodríguez	5^{7}	4^{7}	5^{7}
(Peru) L Horna (Belgium) T Vanhoudt	5	4^{4}	4^{4}
(France) S Grosjean (Czech Republic) R Štěpánek	3	5^{7}	5^{7}
(Argentina) G Gaudio (Argentina) D Nalbandian	2	3
2	(Israel) J Erlich (Israel) A Ram	5	5

Quarterfinals
1	(The Bahamas) M Knowles (Canada) D Nestor	5	5
(Spain) N Almagro (Spain) T Robredo	3	1
3	(Czech Republic) C Suk (Czech Republic) P Vízner	5	5
(Ecuador) N Lapentti (Spain) F López	2	1
(Argentina) A Calleri (Chile) F González	2	4^{5}
4	(Argentina) G Etlis (Argentina) M Rodríguez	5	5^{7}
(France) S Grosjean (Czech Republic) R Štěpánek	2	1
2	(Israel) J Erlich (Israel) A Ram	5	5

Semifinals
1	(The Bahamas) M Knowles (Canada) D Nestor	5^{7}	5
3	(Czech Republic) C Suk (Czech Republic) P Vízner	4^{4}	1
4	(Argentina) G Etlis (Argentina) M Rodríguez	5	2	3
2	(Israel) J Erlich (Israel) A Ram	3	5	5

Final
1	(The Bahamas) M Knowles (Canada) D Nestor	5	5^{7}
2	(Israel) J Erlich (Israel) A Ram	3	4^{2}
