= 2005 BNP Paribas Masters =

- Date: 31 October – 6 November
- Edition: 33rd
- Category: ATP Masters Series
- Draw: 48S / 16D
- Prize money: $2,200,000
- Surface: Carpet / indoor
- Location: Paris, France
- Venue: Palais omnisports de Paris-Bercy

Champions

Singles
- (Czech Republic) Tomáš Berdych

Doubles
- (United States) Bob Bryan / (United States) Mike Bryan
← 2004 ·	Paris Masters	· 2006 →

The 2005 Paris Masters (also known as the BNP Paribas Masters for sponsorship reasons) was a men's tennis tournament played on indoor carpet courts. It was the 33rd edition of the Paris Masters, and was part of the ATP Masters Series of the 2005 ATP Tour. It took place at the Palais omnisports de Paris-Bercy in Paris, France, from 31 October to 6 November 2005. Tomáš Berdych won the singles title.

The singles line up included ATP No. 3, Wimbledon and Indianapolis runner-up, Cincinnati champion Andy Roddick, US Open quarterfinalist, Umag winner, Monte Carlo, Rome and Beijing finalist Guillermo Coria, and French Open semifinalist, St. Pölten winner Nikolay Davydenko. Other top seeds were French Open runner-up, Casablanca titlist Mariano Puerta, Munich winner David Nalbandian, Ivan Ljubičić, Gastón Gaudio and Radek Štěpánek.

== Finals ==
=== Singles ===
(Czech Republic) Tomáš Berdych defeated (Croatia) Ivan Ljubičić, 6–3, 6–4, 3–6, 4–6, 6–4

- It was Berdych's 1st title of the year, and his 2nd overall. It was his first and only career Masters title, and it was the first of three finals.

=== Doubles ===
(United States) Bob Bryan / (United States) Mike Bryan defeated (Canada) Daniel Nestor / (The Bahamas) Mark Knowles, 6–4, 6–7^{(3–7)}, 6–4
