= 2005 BA-CA-TennisTrophy =

- Date: 10–16 October
- Edition: 31st
- Category: International Series Gold
- Draw: 32S / 16D
- Prize money: $664,000
- Surface: Hard / indoor
- Location: Vienna, Austria
- Venue: Wiener Stadthalle

Champions

Singles
- (Croatia) Ivan Ljubičić

Doubles
- (The Bahamas) Mark Knowles / (Canada) Daniel Nestor
← 2004 ·	Vienna Open	· 2006 →

The 2005 BA-CA-TennisTrophy was a men's tennis tournament played on indoor hard courts. It was the 31st edition of the event known that year as the BA-CA-TennisTrophy, and was part of the International Series Gold of the 2005 ATP Tour. It took place at the Wiener Stadthalle in Vienna, Austria, from 10 October until 16 October 2005. Fourth-seeded Ivan Ljubičić won the singles title.

== Finals ==
=== Singles ===
(Croatia) Ivan Ljubičić defeated (Spain) Juan Carlos Ferrero, 6–2, 6–4, 7–6^{(7–5)}

- It was Ivan Ljubičić's 2nd title of the year, and his 3rd overall.

=== Doubles ===
(The Bahamas) Mark Knowles / (Canada) Daniel Nestor defeated (Israel) Jonathan Erlich / (Israel) Andy Ram, 5–3, 5–4^{(7–4)}
