= 2005 If Stockholm Open =

- Date: 10–16 October
- Edition: 37th
- Category: International Series
- Draw: 32S / 16D
- Prize money: $775,000
- Surface: Hard / indoor
- Location: Stockholm, Sweden
- Venue: Kungliga tennishallen

Champions

Singles
- (United States) James Blake

Doubles
- (Australia) Wayne Arthurs / (Australia) Paul Hanley
← 2004 ·	Stockholm Open	· 2006 →

The 2005 If Stockholm Open was an ATP men's tennis tournament played on hard courts and held at the Kungliga tennishallen in Stockholm, Sweden. It was the 37th edition of the event and part of the ATP International Series of the 2005 ATP Tour. The tournament was held from 10 October through 16 October 2005. Sixth-seeded James Blake won the singles title.

== Finals ==
=== Singles ===
(United States) James Blake defeated (Thailand) Paradorn Srichaphan, 6–1, 7–6^{(8–6)}

- It was Blake's 2nd singles title of the year and the 3rd of his career.

=== Doubles ===
(Australia) Wayne Arthurs / (Australia) Paul Hanley defeated (India) Leander Paes / (Serbia and Montenegro) Nenad Zimonjić, 5–3, 5–3
