= 2005 BNP Paribas Masters – Doubles =

Doubles
- 2005 BNP Paribas Masters

Final
- Champions: (United States) Bob Bryan (United States) Mike Bryan
- Runners-up: (The Bahamas) Mark Knowles (Canada) Daniel Nestor
- Score: 6–4, 6–7^{(3–7)}, 6–4

Details
- Draw: 16
- Seeds: 4

Events
Singles	Doubles
← 2004 ·	BNP Paribas Masters	· 2006 →

Jonas Björkman and Todd Woodbridge were the defending champions, but did not participate together this year. Björkman partnered Max Mirnyi, losing in the first round. Woodbridge retired from professional tennis earlier in the year.

Bob Bryan and Mike Bryan won in the final 6–4, 6–7^{(3–7)}, 6–4, against Mark Knowles and Daniel Nestor.

== Seeds ==
1. (Sweden) Jonas Björkman / (Belarus) Max Mirnyi (first round)
2. (United States) Bob Bryan / (United States) Mike Bryan (champions)
3. (Zimbabwe) Wayne Black / (Zimbabwe) Kevin Ullyett (semifinals)
4. (The Bahamas) Mark Knowles / (Canada) Daniel Nestor (final)

== Draw ==
=== Key ===
- Q = Qualifier
- WC = Wild card
- LL = Lucky loser
- Alt = Alternate
- SE = Special exempt
- PR = Protected ranking
- ITF = ITF entry
- JE = Junior exempt
- w/o = Walkover
- r = Retired
- d = Defaulted
- SR = Special ranking

=== Draw ===
First round
1	(Sweden) J Björkman (Belarus) M Mirnyi	6^{4}	7^{8}	4
Alt	(France) G Carraz (France) A Dupuis	7^{7}	6^{6}	6
(Slovakia) D Hrbatý (Sweden) T Johansson	4	6	7
(Czech Republic) F Čermák (Czech Republic) M Damm	6	3	5
4	(The Bahamas) M Knowles (Canada) D Nestor	7^{7}	3	6
(Spain) D Ferrer (Spain) T Robredo	6^{2}	6	1
(Argentina) D Nalbandian (Argentina) S Prieto	6^{5}	4
WC	(France) J Benneteau (France) N Mahut	7^{7}	6
(Australia) W Arthurs (Australia) P Hanley	6	7^{14}
(Sweden) S Aspelin (Australia) T Perry	1	6^{12}
(France) M Llodra (France) F Santoro	2	4
3	(Zimbabwe) W Black (Zimbabwe) K Ullyett	6	6
(Israel) J Erlich (Israel) A Ram	7^{7}	2	6
(India) L Paes (Serbia and Montenegro) N Zimonjić	6^{5}	6	2
WC	(France) A Clément (France) S Grosjean	4	1
2	(United States) B Bryan (United States) M Bryan	6	6

Quarterfinals
Alt	(France) G Carraz (France) A Dupuis	6^{5}	7^{7}	4
(Slovakia) D Hrbatý (Sweden) T Johansson	7^{7}	6^{3}	6
4	(The Bahamas) M Knowles (Canada) D Nestor	6	6^{2}	6
WC	(France) J Benneteau (France) N Mahut	3	7^{7}	4
(Australia) W Arthurs (Australia) P Hanley	3	5
3	(Zimbabwe) W Black (Zimbabwe) K Ullyett	6	7
(Israel) J Erlich (Israel) A Ram	4	1
2	(United States) B Bryan (United States) M Bryan	6	6

Semifinals
(Slovakia) D Hrbatý (Sweden) T Johansson	4	6	3
4	(The Bahamas) M Knowles (Canada) D Nestor	6	3	6
3	(Zimbabwe) W Black (Zimbabwe) K Ullyett	2	3
2	(United States) B Bryan (United States) M Bryan	6	6

Final
4	(The Bahamas) M Knowles (Canada) D Nestor	4	7^{7}	4
2	(United States) B Bryan (United States) M Bryan	6	6^{3}	6
