= 2005 Rogers Cup – Singles =

Singles
- 2005 Rogers Cup

Final
- Champion: (Belgium) Kim Clijsters
- Runner-up: (Belgium) Justine Henin-Hardenne
- Score: 7–5, 6–1

Details
- Draw: 56
- Seeds: 16

Events
Singles	Doubles
- Rogers Cup

Kim Clijsters defeated Justine Henin-Hardenne in the final, 7–5, 6–1 to win the women's singles tennis title at the 2005 Canadian Open.

Amélie Mauresmo was the defending champion, but lost in the semifinals to Henin-Hardenne.

== Seeds ==
The top eight seeds received a bye into the second round.

1. (Russia) Maria Sharapova (withdrew due to a right pectoralis muscle strain)
2. (France) Amélie Mauresmo (semifinals)
3. (Russia) Svetlana Kuznetsova (third round)
4. (Belgium) Justine Henin-Hardenne (final)
5. (United States) Serena Williams (third round, withdrew due to left knee pain)
6. (Russia) Nadia Petrova (quarterfinals, retired due to a right pectoralis strain)
7. (Belgium) Kim Clijsters (champion)
8. (France) Mary Pierce (withdrew due to a right thigh strain)
9. (Russia) Anastasia Myskina (semifinals)
10. (France) Nathalie Dechy (second round)
11. (Serbia and Montenegro) Jelena Janković (first round)
12. (Serbia and Montenegro) Ana Ivanovic (third round, withdrew due to a right pectoralis strain)
13. (Slovakia) Daniela Hantuchová (first round, retired due to heat illness)
14. (Italy) Flavia Pennetta (quarterfinals)
15. (Russia) Dinara Safina (second round)
16. (France) Tatiana Golovin (second round)
17. (Japan) Ai Sugiyama (second round)

== Draw ==
Key

- Q = Qualifier
- WC = Wild card
- LL = Lucky loser
- Alt = Alternate
- ITF = ITF entry
- PR = Protected ranking
- SR = Special ranking
- SE = Special exempt
- JE = Junior exempt
- JR = Junior Accelerator Programme entrant
- CO = College Accelerator Programme entrant
- NG = Next Gen Accelerator Program entrant
- w/o = Walkover
- r = Retired
- d = Defaulted

=== Finals ===
Quarterfinals
(Argentina) Gisela Dulko	4	5
9	(Russia) Anastasia Myskina	6	7
14	(Italy) Flavia Pennetta	0	1
7	(Belgium) Kim Clijsters	6	6
(Czech Republic) Nicole Vaidišová	5	6^{4}
4	(Belgium) Justine Henin-Hardenne	7	7
6	(Russia) Nadia Petrova	6	5	0^{r}
2	(France) Amélie Mauresmo	4	7	2

Semifinals
9	(Russia) Anastasia Myskina	4	1
7	(Belgium) Kim Clijsters	6	6
4	(Belgium) Justine Henin-Hardenne	7	3	6
2	(France) Amélie Mauresmo	5	6	1

Final
7	(Belgium) Kim Clijsters	7	6
4	(Belgium) Justine Henin-Hardenne	5	1

=== Top half ===
==== Section 1 ====
First round
Q	(Czech Republic) L Šafářová	6	5	1
(Spain) A Medina Garrigues	4	7	6
(Argentina) G Dulko	6	6
(Poland) M Domachowska	4	1
(Croatia) K Šprem	4	4
16	(France) T Golovin	6	6
13	(Slovakia) D Hantuchová	4	6	4^{r}
Q	(Russia) A Jidkova	6	4	4
(Japan) S Asagoe	6	6
WC	(Canada) A Wozniak	2	2
Q	(United States) L Granville	6	6
(Italy) R Vinci	2	1

Second round
3	(Russia) S Kuznetsova	2	7	6
(Spain) A Medina Garrigues	6	5	4
(Argentina) G Dulko	2	6	6
16	(France) T Golovin	6	0	1
Q	(Russia) A Jidkova	4	3
(Japan) S Asagoe	6	6
Q	(United States) L Granville	3	7	2
9	(Russia) A Myskina	6	5	6

Third round
3	(Russia) S Kuznetsova	6^{3}	6^{8}
(Argentina) G Dulko	7	7
(Japan) S Asagoe	6^{5}	5
9	(Russia) A Myskina	7	7

Quarterfinals
(Argentina) G Dulko	4	5
9	(Russia) A Myskina	6	7

==== Section 2 ====
First round
Q	(Tunisia) S Sfar	2	5
LL	(France) S Cohen-Aloro	6	7
WC	(Canada) S Dubois	3	2
LL	(Italy) A Serra Zanetti	6	6
Q	(Spain) M Sánchez Lorenzo	4	5
14	(Italy) F Pennetta	6	7
12	(Serbia and Montenegro) A Ivanovic	6	7
Q	(Italy) T Garbin	2	6^{3}
(France) M Bartoli	6	3
(Russia) M Kirilenko	4	0	r
(France) V Razzano	6	3	6
LL	(Spain) V Ruano Pascual	3	6	3

Second round
5	(United States) S Williams	3	6	6
LL	(France) S Cohen-Aloro	6	4	2
LL	(Italy) A Serra Zanetti	4	2
14	(Italy) F Pennetta	6	6
12	(Serbia and Montenegro) A Ivanovic	4	7	7
(France) M Bartoli	6	6^{5}	6^{3}
(France) V Razzano	3	0
7	(Belgium) K Clijsters	6	6

Third round
5	(United States) S Williams
14	(Italy) F Pennetta	w/o
12	(Serbia and Montenegro) A Ivanovic
7	(Belgium) K Clijsters	w/o

Quarterfinals
14	(Italy) F Pennetta	0	1
7	(Belgium) K Clijsters	6	6

=== Bottom half ===
==== Section 3 ====
First round
Q	(Japan) R Fujiwara	6	6
Q	(Italy) ME Camerin	0	3
(Czech Republic) N Vaidišová	6	6
LL	(United States) S Perry	3	2
(Colombia) F Zuluaga	2	4
10	(France) N Dechy	6	6
17	(Japan) A Sugiyama	6	3	6
WC	(Croatia) J Kostanić	2	6	2
Q	(China) J Zheng	6	6
Q	(Argentina) ME Salerni	3	4
Q	(Argentina) M Díaz Oliva	3
(Russia) E Linetskaya	0	r

Second round
LL	(Czech Republic) H Šromová	4	7	6
Q	(Japan) R Fujiwara	6	5	0
(Czech Republic) N Vaidišová	6	6
10	(France) N Dechy	2	4
17	(Japan) A Sugiyama	6	6^{8}	3
Q	(China) J Zheng	2	7	6
Q	(Argentina) M Díaz Oliva	1	3
4	(Belgium) J Henin-Hardenne	6	6

Third round
LL	(Czech Republic) H Šromová	2	2
(Czech Republic) N Vaidišová	6	6
Q	(China) J Zheng	2	4
4	(Belgium) J Henin-Hardenne	6	6

Quarterfinals
(Czech Republic) N Vaidišová	5	6^{4}
4	(Belgium) J Henin-Hardenne	7	7

==== Section 4 ====
First round
(Bulgaria) S Karatantcheva	6	2	6
(United States) J Craybas	2	6	3
(Venezuela) M Vento-Kabchi	6	6
WC	(Canada) M-È Pelletier	0	1
(China) N Li	6	5	6
11	(Serbia and Montenegro) J Janković	4	7	2
15	(Russia) D Safina	6	6
(Spain) N Llagostera Vives	1	2
(Germany) A-L Grönefeld	1	7	5
(Spain) C Martínez	6	6^{1}	7
(Madagascar) D Randriantefy	6	6
Q	(India) S Uberoi	3	2

Second round
6	(Russia) N Petrova	4	6	6
(Bulgaria) S Karatantcheva	6	1	4
(Venezuela) M Vento-Kabchi	4	7	2
(China) N Li	6	6^{5}	6
15	(Russia) D Safina	5	2
(Spain) C Martínez	7	6
(Madagascar) D Randriantefy	2	3
2	(France) A Mauresmo	6	6

Third round
6	(Russia) N Petrova	6	3
(China) N Li	2	0	r
(Spain) C Martínez	0	2
2	(France) A Mauresmo	6	6

Quarterfinals
6	(Russia) N Petrova	6	5	0^{r}
2	(France) A Mauresmo	4	7	2
