= 2005 Rogers Masters – Doubles =

Doubles
- 2005 Rogers Masters

Final
- Champions: (Zimbabwe) Wayne Black (Zimbabwe) Kevin Ullyett
- Runners-up: (Israel) Jonathan Erlich (Israel) Andy Ram
- Score: 6–7^{(5–7)}, 6–3, 6–0

Details
- Draw: 24
- Seeds: 8

Events
Singles	Doubles
- Rogers Masters

Mahesh Bhupathi and Leander Paes were the defending champions. They were both present but did not compete together.
Bhupathi partnered with Martin Damm, but lost in the quarterfinals to Wayne Black and Kevin Ullyett.
Paes partnered with Nenad Zimonjić, but lost in the second round to Jonathan Erlich and Andy Ram.

Wayne Black and Kevin Ullyett won in the final 6–7^{(5–7)}, 6–3, 6–0, against Jonathan Erlich and Andy Ram.

== Seeds ==
All seeds receive a bye into the second round.

1. (Sweden) Jonas Björkman / (Belarus) Max Mirnyi (semifinals)
2. (United States) Bob Bryan / (United States) Mike Bryan (semifinals)
3. (The Bahamas) Mark Knowles / (Canada) Daniel Nestor (quarterfinals)
4. (Zimbabwe) Wayne Black / (Zimbabwe) Kevin Ullyett (champions)
5. (India) Leander Paes / (Serbia and Montenegro) Nenad Zimonjić (second round)
6. (France) Michaël Llodra / (France) Fabrice Santoro (withdrew due to a foot injury for Llodra)
7. (India) Mahesh Bhupathi / (Czech Republic) Martin Damm (quarterfinals)
8. (Australia) Wayne Arthurs / (Australia) Paul Hanley (third round, withdrew due to a shoulder injury for Hanley)

== Draw ==
Key

- Q = Qualifier
- WC = Wild card
- LL = Lucky loser
- Alt = Alternate
- ITF = ITF entry
- PR = Protected ranking
- SR = Special ranking
- SE = Special exempt
- JE = Junior exempt
- JR = Junior Accelerator Programme entrant
- CO = College Accelerator Programme entrant
- NG = Next Gen Accelerator Program entrant
- w/o = Walkover
- r = Retired
- d = Defaulted

=== Finals ===
Semifinals
1	(Sweden) Jonas Björkman (Belarus) Max Mirnyi	4	6	5
4	(Zimbabwe) Wayne Black (Zimbabwe) Kevin Ullyett	6	3	7
(Israel) Jonathan Erlich (Israel) Andy Ram	7	6^{4}	6
2	(United States) Bob Bryan (United States) Mike Bryan	6^{4}	7	4

Final
4	(Zimbabwe) Wayne Black (Zimbabwe) Kevin Ullyett	6^{5}	6	6
(Israel) Jonathan Erlich (Israel) Andy Ram	7	3	0

=== Top half ===
First round
(Sweden) T Johansson (Russia) M Youzhny	7	6
(Sweden) S Aspelin (Australia) T Perry	6^{5}	2
(Argentina) G Etlis (Argentina) M Rodríguez	7	7
(Chile) F González (Chile) N Massú	6^{5}	6^{6}
WC	(France) S Grosjean (Canada) F Niemeyer	4	6	4
(Spain) D Ferrer (France) R Gasquet	6	3	6
(Czech Republic) C Suk (Czech Republic) P Vízner	1	6	6
(Russia) N Davydenko (Czech Republic) J Novák	6	3	4

Second round
1	(Sweden) J Björkman (Belarus) M Mirnyi	6	7
(Sweden) T Johansson (Russia) M Youzhny	2	6^{3}
(Argentina) G Etlis (Argentina) M Rodríguez	6	6^{2}	6^{4}
ALT	(France) G Oliver (United States) T Parrott	4	7	7
4	(Zimbabwe) W Black (Zimbabwe) K Ullyett	6	6
(Spain) D Ferrer (France) R Gasquet	2	2
(Czech Republic) C Suk (Czech Republic) P Vízner	3	6^{4}
7	(India) M Bhupathi (Czech Republic) M Damm	6	7

Quarterfinals
1	(Sweden) J Björkman (Belarus) M Mirnyi	6	7
ALT	(France) G Oliver (United States) T Parrott	4	6^{7}
4	(Zimbabwe) W Black (Zimbabwe) K Ullyett	6	7
7	(India) M Bhupathi (Czech Republic) M Damm	3	6^{7}

Semifinals
1	(Sweden) J Björkman (Belarus) M Mirnyi	4	6	5
4	(Zimbabwe) W Black (Zimbabwe) K Ullyett	6	3	7

=== Bottom half ===
First round
(Israel) J Erlich (Israel) A Ram	7	2	7
(Australia) S Huss (South Africa) W Moodie	6^{2}	6	6^{4}
(Argentina) D Nalbandian (Argentina) M Puerta	6	4	6
(Argentina) G Gaudio (Spain) F López	3	6	1
(Czech Republic) L Friedl (Romania) A Pavel	7	7
WC	(Canada) P Bester (Canada) F Dancevic	6^{3}	6^{4}
(Spain) R Nadal (Spain) T Robredo	7	6
(Switzerland) Y Allegro (Slovakia) D Hrbatý	6^{3}	2

Second round
5	(India) L Paes (Serbia and Montenegro) N Zimonjić	6	3	6^{3}
(Israel) J Erlich (Israel) A Ram	2	6	7
(Argentina) D Nalbandian (Argentina) M Puerta	6	7
3	(The Bahamas) M Knowles (Canada) D Nestor	3	6^{3}
8	(Australia) W Arthurs (Australia) P Hanley	7	6
(Czech Republic) L Friedl (Romania) A Pavel	6^{2}	4
(Spain) R Nadal (Spain) T Robredo
2	(United States) B Bryan (United States) M Bryan	w/o

Quarterfinals
(Israel) J Erlich (Israel) A Ram	4	7	7
3	(The Bahamas) M Knowles (Canada) D Nestor	6	6^{8}	6^{4}
8	(Australia) W Arthurs (Australia) P Hanley
2	(United States) B Bryan (United States) M Bryan	w/o

Semifinals
(Israel) J Erlich (Israel) A Ram	7	6^{4}	6
2	(United States) B Bryan (United States) M Bryan	6^{4}	7	4
