= 2005 Mutua Madrileña Masters Madrid =

- Date: 17–24 October
- Edition: 4th
- Category: ATP Masters Series
- Draw: 48S / 16D
- Prize money: $2,200,000
- Surface: Hard / indoor
- Location: Madrid, Spain
- Venue: Madrid Arena

Champions

Singles
- (Spain) Rafael Nadal

Doubles
- (The Bahamas) Mark Knowles / (Canada) Daniel Nestor
← 2004 ·	Madrid Open	· 2006 →

The 2005 Madrid Masters (also known as the Mutua Madrileña Masters Madrid for sponsorship reasons) was a tennis tournament played on indoor hard courts. It was the 4th edition of the Madrid Masters, and was part of the ATP Masters Series of the 2005 ATP Tour. It took place at the Madrid Arena in Madrid, Spain, from 17 October through 24 October 2005. First-seeded Rafael Nadal won the singles title.

The singles field was led by World No. 2 Rafael Nadal. Other top seeds were Andy Roddick and Nikolay Davydenko.

== Finals ==
=== Singles ===
(Spain) Rafael Nadal defeated (Croatia) Ivan Ljubičić 3–6, 2–6, 6–4, 6–3, 7–6^{(7–3)}

- It was Rafael Nadal's 11th title of the year and his 12th overall. It was his 4th Masters Series title of the year, and overall.

=== Doubles ===
(The Bahamas) Mark Knowles / (Canada) Daniel Nestor defeated (India) Leander Paes / (Serbia) Nenad Zimonjić 3–6, 6–3, 6–2
