= 2005 Mutua Madrileña Masters Madrid – Doubles =

Doubles
- 2005 Mutua Madrileña Masters Madrid

Final
- Champions: (The Bahamas) Mark Knowles (Canada) Daniel Nestor
- Runners-up: (India) Leander Paes (Serbia and Montenegro) Nenad Zimonjić
- Score: 3–6, 6–3, 6–2

Details
- Draw: 16
- Seeds: 4

Events
Singles	Doubles
- Madrid Open

Mark Knowles and Daniel Nestor were the defending champions and successfully defended their title, defeating Leander Paes and Nenad Zimonjić 3–6, 6–3, 6–2 in the final. It was the 39th doubles title for Knowles and the 41st doubles title for Nestor, in their respective careers. It was also the 4th and final title of the year for the pair.

== Seeds ==
1. (United States) Bob Bryan / (United States) Mike Bryan (first round)
2. (Zimbabwe) Wayne Black / (Zimbabwe) Kevin Ullyett (semifinals)
3. (The Bahamas) Mark Knowles / (Canada) Daniel Nestor (champions)
4. (France) Michaël Llodra / (France) Fabrice Santoro (semifinals)

== Draw ==
Key

- Q = Qualifier
- WC = Wild card
- LL = Lucky loser
- Alt = Alternate
- ITF = ITF entry
- PR = Protected ranking
- SR = Special ranking
- SE = Special exempt
- JE = Junior exempt
- JR = Junior Accelerator Programme entrant
- CO = College Accelerator Programme entrant
- NG = Next Gen Accelerator Program entrant
- w/o = Walkover
- r = Retired
- d = Defaulted

=== Draw ===
First round
1	(United States) B Bryan (United States) M Bryan	3	7^{10}	2
(India) M Bhupathi (Czech Republic) M Damm	6	6^{8}	6
(India) L Paes (Serbia and Montenegro) N Zimonjić	6	1	7^{7}
Alt	(United States) T Dent (United States) R Ginepri	1	6	6^{4}
4	(France) M Llodra (France) F Santoro	6	2	6
(Czech Republic) F Čermák (Czech Republic) L Friedl	3	6	3
(Sweden) T Johansson (Belarus) M Mirnyi	6^{7}	6	4
WC	(United States) J Blake (United States) A Roddick	7^{9}	3	6
(Argentina) G Gaudio (Argentina) M Puerta	3	2
WC	(Spain) D Ferrer (Spain) F Verdasco	6	6
(Sweden) S Aspelin (Australia) T Perry	3	4
3	(The Bahamas) M Knowles (Canada) D Nestor	6	6
(Australia) W Arthurs (Australia) P Hanley	6	6^{7}	6
(Israel) J Erlich (Israel) A Ram	3	7^{9}	4
(Russia) N Davydenko (Chile) F González	1	6	3
2	(Zimbabwe) W Black (Zimbabwe) K Ullyett	6	4	6

Quarterfinals
(India) M Bhupathi (Czech Republic) M Damm	6^{3}	5
(India) L Paes (Serbia and Montenegro) N Zimonjić	7^{7}	7
4	(France) M Llodra (France) F Santoro	w/o
WC	(United States) J Blake (United States) A Roddick
WC	(Spain) D Ferrer (Spain) F Verdasco	3	1
3	(The Bahamas) M Knowles (Canada) D Nestor	6	6
(Australia) W Arthurs (Australia) P Hanley	4	4
2	(Zimbabwe) W Black (Zimbabwe) K Ullyett	6	6

Semifinals
(India) L Paes (Serbia and Montenegro) N Zimonjić	7^{7}	7
4	(France) M Llodra (France) F Santoro	6^{5}	5
3	(The Bahamas) M Knowles (Canada) D Nestor	6	7^{7}
2	(Zimbabwe) W Black (Zimbabwe) K Ullyett	4	6^{3}

Final
(India) L Paes (Serbia and Montenegro) N Zimonjić	6	3	2
3	(The Bahamas) M Knowles (Canada) D Nestor	3	6	6
