= 2005 Rogers Cup – Doubles =

Doubles
- 2005 Rogers Cup

Final
- Champions: (Germany) Anna-Lena Grönefeld (United States) Martina Navratilova
- Runners-up: (Spain) Conchita Martínez (Spain) Virginia Ruano Pascual
- Score: 5–7, 6–3, 6–4

Details
- Draw: 28
- Seeds: 8

Events
Singles	Doubles
- Rogers Cup

Shinobu Asagoe and Ai Sugiyama were the defending champions. They were both present but did not compete together.
Asagoe partnered with Tathiana Garbin, but lost in the semifinals to Conchita Martínez and Virginia Ruano Pascual.
Sugiyama partnered with Daniela Hantuchová, but lost in the semifinals to Anna-Lena Grönefeld and Martina Navratilova.

Anna-Lena Grönefeld and Martina Navratilova won in the final 5–7, 6–3, 6–4, against Conchita Martínez and Virginia Ruano Pascual.

== Seeds ==
The top four seeds received a bye into the second round.

1. (Zimbabwe) Cara Black / (Australia) Rennae Stubbs (quarterfinals)
2. (Russia) Svetlana Kuznetsova / (Russia) Nadia Petrova (quarterfinals, withdrew due to a mid back strain for Kuznetsova)
3. (Spain) Conchita Martínez / (Spain) Virginia Ruano Pascual (final)
4. (Slovakia) Daniela Hantuchová / (Japan) Ai Sugiyama (semifinals)
5. (Spain) Anabel Medina Garrigues / (Russia) Dinara Safina (quarterfinals)
6. (Germany) Anna-Lena Grönefeld / (United States) Martina Navratilova (champions)
7. (France) Marion Bartoli / (Australia) Nicole Pratt (second round)
8. (Japan) Shinobu Asagoe / (Italy) Tathiana Garbin (semifinals)

== Draw ==
Key

- Q = Qualifier
- WC = Wild card
- LL = Lucky loser
- Alt = Alternate
- ITF = ITF entry
- PR = Protected ranking
- SR = Special ranking
- SE = Special exempt
- JE = Junior exempt
- JR = Junior Accelerator Programme entrant
- CO = College Accelerator Programme entrant
- NG = Next Gen Accelerator Program entrant
- w/o = Walkover
- r = Retired
- d = Defaulted

=== Finals ===
Semifinals
6	(Germany) Anna-Lena Grönefeld (United States) Martina Navratilova	7	6
4	(Slovakia) Daniela Hantuchová (Japan) Ai Sugiyama	5	4
3	(Spain) Conchita Martínez (Spain) Virginia Ruano Pascual	3	6	6
8	(Japan) Shinobu Asagoe (Italy) Tathiana Garbin	6	3	2

Final
6	(Germany) Anna-Lena Grönefeld (United States) Martina Navratilova	5	6	6
3	(Spain) Conchita Martínez (Spain) Virginia Ruano Pascual	7	3	4

=== Top half ===
First round
(Belgium) E Callens (Slovenia) T Križan	7	4	3
(France) N Dechy (France) T Golovin	5	6	6
(Canada) M Drake (South Africa) K Grant	2	4
(Czech Republic) H Šromová (China) J Zheng	6	6
(Italy) R Vinci (Russia) G Voskoboeva	4	2
6	(Germany) A-L Grönefeld (United States) M Navratilova	6	6
WC	(Canada) S Dubois (Serbia and Montenegro) A Ivanovic	7	2	6^{5}
(Spain) N Llagostera Vives (Italy) F Pennetta	5	6	7
(Japan) R Fujiwara (Germany) M Müller	6	4	2
(United States) L Granville (United States) C Gullickson	3	6	6
(Italy) R Grande (Australia) B Stewart	6^{4}	6	1
7	(France) M Bartoli (Australia) N Pratt	7	0	6

Second round
1	(Zimbabwe) C Black (Australia) R Stubbs	6	4	6
(France) N Dechy (France) T Golovin	2	6	3
(Czech Republic) H Šromová (China) J Zheng	2	5
6	(Germany) A-L Grönefeld (United States) M Navratilova	6	7
4	(Slovakia) D Hantuchová (Japan) A Sugiyama	6	6
(Spain) N Llagostera Vives (Italy) F Pennetta	3	4
(United States) L Granville (United States) C Gullickson	6	1	6
7	(France) M Bartoli (Australia) N Pratt	3	6	4

Quarterfinals
1	(Zimbabwe) C Black (Australia) R Stubbs	6^{7}	4
6	(Germany) A-L Grönefeld (United States) M Navratilova	7	6
4	(Slovakia) D Hantuchová (Japan) A Sugiyama	7	6
(United States) L Granville (United States) C Gullickson	5	4

Semifinals
6	(Germany) A-L Grönefeld (United States) M Navratilova	7	6
4	(Slovakia) D Hantuchová (Japan) A Sugiyama	5	4

=== Bottom half ===
First round
5	(Spain) A Medina Garrigues (Russia) D Safina	6	7
Q	(Ukraine) O Antypina (Russia) E Vesnina	3	5
(Latvia) L Dekmeijere (Croatia) J Kostanić	6	6
(United States) J Craybas (United States) J Russell	2	3
(Italy) ME Camerin (Italy) A Serra Zanetti	2	6	1
(Argentina) ME Salerni (Venezuela) M Vento-Kabchi	6	4	6
8	(Japan) S Asagoe (Italy) T Garbin	6	6
(Russia) A Jidkova (Slovenia) M Matevžič	3	1
(France) S Cohen-Aloro (Tunisia) S Sfar	4	6	6
(Poland) M Domachowska (Croatia) S Talaja	6	4	2
(Argentina) G Dulko (Russia) M Kirilenko	6	6
WC	(Canada) M-È Pelletier (Canada) A Wozniak	1	1

Second round
5	(Spain) A Medina Garrigues (Russia) D Safina	6	6
(Latvia) L Dekmeijere (Croatia) J Kostanić	2	4
(Argentina) ME Salerni (Venezuela) M Vento-Kabchi	3	6	3
3	(Spain) C Martínez (Spain) V Ruano Pascual	6	0	6
8	(Japan) S Asagoe (Italy) T Garbin	6	4	6
(France) S Cohen-Aloro (Tunisia) S Sfar	3	6	3
(Argentina) G Dulko (Russia) M Kirilenko
2	(Russia) S Kuznetsova (Russia) N Petrova	w/o

Quarterfinals
5	(Spain) A Medina Garrigues (Russia) D Safina	3	2
3	(Spain) C Martínez (Spain) V Ruano Pascual	6	6
8	(Japan) S Asagoe (Italy) T Garbin	w/o
2	(Russia) S Kuznetsova (Russia) N Petrova

Semifinals
3	(Spain) C Martínez (Spain) V Ruano Pascual	3	6	6
8	(Japan) S Asagoe (Italy) T Garbin	6	3	2
