= 2005 Hamburg Masters =

- Date: 9–16 May
- Edition: 99th
- Category: ATP Masters Series
- Draw: 64S / 24D
- Prize money: $2,200,000
- Surface: Clay / outdoor
- Location: Hamburg, Germany
- Venue: Rothenbaum Tennis Center

Champions

Singles
- (Switzerland) Roger Federer

Doubles
- (Sweden) Jonas Björkman / (Belarus) Max Mirnyi
← 2004 ·	Hamburg Masters	· 2006 →

The 2005 Hamburg Masters was a tennis tournament played on outdoor clay courts. It was the 99th edition of the Hamburg Masters, and was part of the ATP Masters Series of the 2005 ATP Tour. It took place at the Rothenbaum Tennis Center in Hamburg, Germany, from 9 May through 16 May 2005. First-seeded and defending champion Roger Federer won the singles title.

== Finals ==
=== Singles ===
(Switzerland) Roger Federer defeated (France) Richard Gasquet, 6–3, 7–5, 7–6^{(7–4)}

- It was Federer's 6th title of the year, and his 28th overall. It was his 3rd Masters title of the year, and his 7th overall. It was his third victory at the event after winning in 2002 and 2004.

=== Doubles ===
(Sweden) Jonas Björkman / (Belarus) Max Mirnyi defeated (France) Michaël Llodra / (France) Fabrice Santoro, 6–2, 6–3
