= 2005 Hamburg Masters – Doubles =

Doubles
- 2005 Hamburg Masters

Final
- Champion: (Sweden) Jonas Björkman (Belarus) Max Mirnyi
- Runner-up: (France) Michaël Llodra (France) Fabrice Santoro
- Score: 4–6, 7–6^{(7–2)}, 7–6^{(7–3)}

Details
- Draw: 24 (2WC)
- Seeds: 8

Events
Singles	Doubles
- Hamburg Masters

Wayne Black and Kevin Ullyett were the defending champions, but lost in second round to Mario Ančić and Ivan Ljubičić.

Jonas Björkman and Max Mirnyi won the title, defeating Michaël Llodra and Fabrice Santoro 4–6, 7–6^{(7–2)}, 7–6^{(7–3)} in the final.

== Seeds ==
All seeds received a bye into the second round.

1. (The Bahamas) Mark Knowles / (Canada) Daniel Nestor (quarterfinals)
2. (Sweden) Jonas Björkman / (Belarus) Max Mirnyi (champions)
3. (United States) Bob Bryan / (United States) Mike Bryan (quarterfinals)
4. (Zimbabwe) Wayne Black / (Zimbabwe) Kevin Ullyett (second round)
5. (India) Mahesh Bhupathi / (Australia) Todd Woodbridge (quarterfinals)
6. (India) Leander Paes / (Serbia and Montenegro) Nenad Zimonjić (semifinals)
7. (Australia) Wayne Arthurs / (Australia) Paul Hanley (quarterfinals)
8. (France) Michaël Llodra / (France) Fabrice Santoro (final)

== Draw ==
Key

- Q = Qualifier
- WC = Wild card
- LL = Lucky loser
- Alt = Alternate
- ITF = ITF entry
- PR = Protected ranking
- SR = Special ranking
- SE = Special exempt
- JE = Junior exempt
- JR = Junior Accelerator Programme entrant
- CO = College Accelerator Programme entrant
- NG = Next Gen Accelerator Program entrant
- w/o = Walkover
- r = Retired
- d = Defaulted

=== Finals ===
Semifinals
8	(France) Michaël Llodra (France) Fabrice Santoro	6	6
6	(India) Leander Paes (Serbia and Montenegro) Nenad Zimonjić	3	2
(Croatia) Mario Ančić (Croatia) Ivan Ljubičić	6^{6}	5
2	(Sweden) Jonas Björkman (Belarus) Max Mirnyi	7^{8}	7

Final
8	(France) Michaël Llodra (France) Fabrice Santoro	6	6^{2}	6^{3}
2	(Sweden) Jonas Björkman (Belarus) Max Mirnyi	4	7^{7}	7^{7}

=== Top half ===
First round
(Argentina) M Hood (Austria) J Knowle	6	7^{7}
(Czech Republic) C Suk (Czech Republic) P Vízner	2	6^{3}
(Sweden) S Aspelin (Australia) T Perry	7^{8}	3	5
WC	(Germany) N Kiefer (Germany) A Waske	6^{6}	6	7
WC	(Germany) M Kohlmann (Germany) R Schüttler	7^{8}	6
(Czech Republic) J Novák (Spain) T Robredo	6^{6}	2
(Switzerland) Y Allegro (Switzerland) R Federer	6	6
(Spain) D Ferrer (Slovakia) D Hrbatý	3	4

Second round
1	(The Bahamas) M Knowles (Canada) D Nestor	5	7	6
(Argentina) M Hood (Austria) J Knowle	7	5	4
WC	(Germany) N Kiefer (Germany) A Waske	5	3
8	(France) M Llodra (France) F Santoro	7	6
3	(United States) B Bryan (United States) M Bryan	6	6
WC	(Germany) M Kohlmann (Germany) R Schüttler	0	1
(Switzerland) Y Allegro (Switzerland) R Federer	4	2
6	(India) L Paes (Serbia and Montenegro) N Zimonjić	6	6

Quarterfinals
1	(The Bahamas) M Knowles (Canada) D Nestor	4	4
8	(France) M Llodra (France) F Santoro	6	6
3	(United States) B Bryan (United States) M Bryan	6	6^{5}	5
6	(India) L Paes (Serbia and Montenegro) N Zimonjić	3	7^{7}	7

Semifinals
8	(France) M Llodra (France) F Santoro	6	6
6	(India) L Paes (Serbia and Montenegro) N Zimonjić	3	2

=== Bottom half ===
First round
(Czech Republic) P Pála (Romania) A Pavel	4	6	2
(Chile) F González (Chile) N Massú	6	4	6
(Argentina) L Arnold (Belgium) O Rochus	2	3
(Croatia) M Ančić (Croatia) I Ljubičić	6	6
(Argentina) G Etlis (Argentina) M Rodríguez	6^{2}	4
(Israel) J Erlich (Israel) A Ram	7^{7}	1^{r}
(Sweden) J Johansson (Sweden) T Johansson	2	5
(Czech Republic) L Friedl (Czech Republic) J Levinský	6	7

Second round
7	(Australia) W Arthurs (Australia) P Hanley	7^{8}	6
(Chile) F González (Chile) N Massú	6^{6}	4
(Croatia) M Ančić (Croatia) I Ljubičić	4	6	6
4	(Zimbabwe) W Black (Zimbabwe) K Ullyett	6	3	4
5	(India) M Bhupathi (Australia) T Woodbridge	6	6
(Argentina) G Etlis (Argentina) M Rodríguez	2	3
(Czech Republic) L Friedl (Czech Republic) J Levinský	1	3
2	(Sweden) J Björkman (Belarus) M Mirnyi	6	6

Quarterfinals
7	(Australia) W Arthurs (Australia) P Hanley	3	6	3
(Croatia) M Ančić (Croatia) I Ljubičić	6	3	6
5	(India) M Bhupathi (Australia) T Woodbridge	2	3
2	(Sweden) J Björkman (Belarus) M Mirnyi	6	6

Semifinals
(Croatia) M Ančić (Croatia) I Ljubičić	6^{6}	5
2	(Sweden) J Björkman (Belarus) M Mirnyi	7^{8}	7
