= 2005 Rogers Cup =

- Date: August 8–14 (men); August 15–21 (women)
- Edition: 116th (men) / 104th (women)
- Location: Montreal, Quebec, Canada (men); Toronto, Ontario, Canada (women)
- Venue: Rexall Centre

Champions

Men's singles
- (Spain) Rafael Nadal

Women's singles
- (Belgium) Kim Clijsters

Men's doubles
- (Zimbabwe) Wayne Black / (Zimbabwe) Kevin Ullyett

Women's doubles
- (Germany) Anna-Lena Grönefeld / (United States) Martina Navratilova
- Canadian Open

The 2005 Canada Masters (also known as the 2005 Rogers Masters and 2005 Rogers Cup for sponsorship reasons) was a tennis tournament played on outdoor hard courts. It was the 116th edition of the Canada Masters, and was part of the ATP Masters Series of the 2005 ATP Tour, and of the Tier I Series of the 2005 WTA Tour. The men's event took place at the Uniprix Stadium in Montreal, Quebec, Canada, from August 8 through August 14, 2005, and the women's event at the Rexall Centre in Toronto, Ontario, Canada, from August 15 through August 21, 2005.

The men's field was led by ATP No. 2 and French Open champion Rafael Nadal, Australian Open and Indian Wells finalist Lleyton Hewitt, and Wimbledon runner-up and Washington winner Andy Roddick. Among other seeds were former World No. 1 and recent Los Angeles champion Andre Agassi, Pörtschach titlist Nikolay Davydenko, Gastón Gaudio, Guillermo Coria and Mariano Puerta.

The women's draw featured WTA No. 2 and Rome winner Amélie Mauresmo, Warsaw runner-up Svetlana Kuznetsova, and Roland-Garros champion Justine Henin-Hardenne. Other top seeds were Australian Open champion Serena Williams, Berlin finalist Nadia Petrova, Kim Clijsters, Anastasia Myskina and Nathalie Dechy.

== Finals ==
=== Men's singles ===
(Spain) Rafael Nadal defeated (United States) Andre Agassi, 6–3, 4–6, 6–2

- It was Rafael Nadal's 9th title of the year, and his 10th overall. It was his 3rd Masters title of the year, and overall.

=== Women's singles ===
(Belgium) Kim Clijsters defeated (Belgium) Justine Henin-Hardenne, 7–5, 6–1

- It was Kim Clijsters's 6th title of the year, and her 27th overall. It was her 3rd Tier I title of the year, and her 5th overall.

=== Men's doubles ===
(Zimbabwe) Wayne Black / (Zimbabwe) Kevin Ullyett defeated (Israel) Jonathan Erlich / (Israel) Andy Ram, 6–7^{(5–7)}, 6–3, 6–0

=== Women's doubles ===
(Germany) Anna-Lena Grönefeld / (United States) Martina Navratilova defeated (Spain) Conchita Martínez / (Spain) Virginia Ruano Pascual, 5–7, 6–3, 6–4
