= 2005 Hamburg Masters – Singles =

Singles
- 2005 Hamburg Masters

Final
- Champion: (Switzerland) Roger Federer
- Runner-up: (France) Richard Gasquet
- Score: 6–3, 7–5, 7–6^{(7–4)}

Details
- Draw: 64 (4WC/8Q/2LL)
- Seeds: 16

Events
Singles	Doubles
- Hamburg Masters

Defending champion Roger Federer defeated Richard Gasquet in the final, 6–3, 7–5, 7–6^{(7–4)} to win the singles tennis title at the 2005 Hamburg European Open for the third time in the last four years. He did not lose a single set in the entire tournament.

== Seeds ==
A champion seed is indicated in bold text while text in italics indicates the round in which that seed was eliminated.

1. (Switzerland) **Roger Federer (champion)**
2. (United States) Andy Roddick (first round)
3. (Russia) Marat Safin (second round)
4. (Argentina) Gastón Gaudio (third round)
5. (United Kingdom) Tim Henman (third round)
6. (Spain) ~~Rafael Nadal~~ (withdrew because of a left hand injury)
7. (Spain) ~~Carlos Moyá~~ (withdrew because of a shoulder injury)
8. (United States) Andre Agassi (first round)
9. (Argentina) David Nalbandian (first round)
10. (Argentina) Guillermo Coria (quarterfinals)
11. (Sweden) Joachim Johansson (first round)
12. (Argentina) Guillermo Cañas (second round)
13. (Croatia) Ivan Ljubičić (second round)
14. (Spain) Tommy Robredo (third round)
15. (Russia) Nikolay Davydenko (semifinals)
16. (Czech Republic) Radek Štěpánek (second round)

== Draw ==
Key

- Q = Qualifier
- WC = Wild card
- LL = Lucky loser
- Alt = Alternate
- ITF = ITF entry
- PR = Protected ranking
- SR = Special ranking
- SE = Special exempt
- JE = Junior exempt
- JR = Junior Accelerator Programme entrant
- CO = College Accelerator Programme entrant
- NG = Next Gen Accelerator Program entrant
- w/o = Walkover
- r = Retired
- d = Defaulted

=== Finals ===
Semifinals
1	(Switzerland) **Roger Federer**	**6**	**6**
15	(Russia) Nikolay Davydenko	3	4
Q	(Belgium) Christophe Rochus	1	1
Q	(France) **Richard Gasquet**	**6**	**6**

Final
1	(Switzerland) **Roger Federer**	**6**	**7**	**7^{7}**
Q	(France) Richard Gasquet	3	5	6^{4}

=== Top half ===
==== Section 1 ====
First round
1	(Switzerland) **R Federer**	**6**	**6**
(Spain) F Verdasco	4	3
(Spain) D Ferrer	2	**6**	3
(Czech Republic) **T Berdych**	**6**	2	**6**
(Romania) A Pavel	2	1
(Brazil) **G Kuerten**	**6**	**6**
WC	(Germany) A Waske	**6**	5	3
14	(Spain) **T Robredo**	4	**7**	**6**
10	(Argentina) **G Coria**	**6**	**6**
(United States) V Spadea	0	2
(Slovakia) K Beck	3	2
(Russia) **M Youzhny**	**6**	**6**
(Croatia) **M Ančić**	**6**	**6**
(Germany) F Mayer	1	2
(Chile) **F González**	**6**	**6**
LL	(France) P-H Mathieu	4	4

Second round
1	(Switzerland) **R Federer**	**6**	**6**
(Czech Republic) T Berdych	2	1
(Brazil) G Kuerten	3	0
14	(Spain) **T Robredo**	**6**	**6**
10	(Argentina) **G Coria**	**6**	**6**
(Russia) M Youzhny	2	3
(Croatia) **M Ančić**	**6**	**7^{7}**
(Chile) F González	3	6^{1}

Third round
1	(Switzerland) **R Federer**	**6**	**6**
14	(Spain) T Robredo	2	3
10	(Argentina) **G Coria**	**6**	**6**
(Croatia) M Ančić	4	3

Quarterfinals
1	(Switzerland) **R Federer**	**6**	**7^{7}**
10	(Argentina) G Coria	4	6^{3}

==== Section 2 ====
First round
3	(Russia) **M Safin**	**6**	**6**
(Spain) A Martín	1	0
(Austria) J Melzer	3	5
Q	(Spain) **J C Ferrero**	**6**	**7**
Q	(Argentina) **M Puerta**	4	**6**	**6**
(Belgium) O Rochus	**6**	1	3
(France) M Llodra	1	1
15	(Russia) **N Davydenko**	**6**	**6**
11	(Sweden) J Johansson	1	4
(France) **S Grosjean**	**6**	**6**
WC	(Germany) P Kohlschreiber	4	3
(Germany) **N Kiefer**	**6**	**6**
(Italy) **F Volandri**	**6**	**6**
Q	(Spain) N Almagro	3	2
(Spain) **F López**	**6**	**7^{7}**
8	(United States) A Agassi	2	6^{5}

Second round
3	(Russia) M Safin	**6**	4	2
Q	(Spain) **J C Ferrero**	4	**6**	**6**
Q	(Argentina) M Puerta	5	3
15	(Russia) **N Davydenko**	**7**	**6**
(France) **S Grosjean**	2	**6**	**6**
(Germany) N Kiefer	**6**	3	4
(Italy) **F Volandri**	**6**	2	**6**
(Spain) F López	4	**6**	2

Third round
Q	(Spain) J C Ferrero	**6**	2	1
15	(Russia) **N Davydenko**	3	**6**	**6**
(France) S Grosjean	3	4
(Italy) **F Volandri**	**6**	**6**

Quarterfinals
15	(Russia) **N Davydenko**	**7^{7}**	**6**
(Italy) F Volandri	6^{5}	4

=== Bottom half ===
==== Section 3 ====
First round
5	(United Kingdom) **T Henman**	**6**	**6**
WC	(Germany) L Burgsmüller	3	4
(United Kingdom) **G Rusedski**	**7^{7}**	3	**6**
WC	(Germany) P Petzschner	6^{3}	**6**	3
(Argentina) **J I Chela**	4	**6**	**6**
(Sweden) T Johansson	**6**	3	4
(Sweden) **R Söderling**	**7^{10}**	**7**
9	(Argentina) D Nalbandian	6^{8}	5
13	(Croatia) **I Ljubičić**	**6**	**6**
(Peru) L Horna	3	3
Q	(Spain) S Ventura	3	2
Q	(Belgium) **C Rochus**	**6**	**6**
(Belarus) M Mirnyi	6^{3}	5
(Spain) **Á Costa**	**7^{7}**	**7**
Q	(Spain) D Sánchez	2	2
4	(Argentina) **G Gaudio**	**6**	**6**

Second round
5	(United Kingdom) **T Henman**	**7^{7}**	**6**
(United Kingdom) G Rusedski	6^{3}	4
(Argentina) **J I Chela**	**6**	**6**
(Sweden) R Söderling	1	4
13	(Croatia) I Ljubičić	4	2
Q	(Belgium) **C Rochus**	**6**	**6**
(Spain) Á Costa	2	0
4	(Argentina) **G Gaudio**	**6**	**6**

Third round
5	(United Kingdom) T Henman	**6**	4	2
(Argentina) **J I Chela**	3	**6**	**6**
Q	(Belgium) **C Rochus**	2	**7**	**6**
4	(Argentina) G Gaudio	**6**	5	3

Quarterfinals
(Argentina) J I Chela	**6**	0	3
Q	(Belgium) **C Rochus**	3	**6**	**6**

==== Section 4 ====
First round
LL	(Argentina) **J Mónaco**	**6**	6^{5}	**6**
(Russia) I Andreev	2	**7^{7}**	1
(Czech Republic) **J Novák**	**6**	**6**
(Thailand) P Srichaphan	2	3
(Germany) R Schüttler	5	**7^{7}**	4
Q	(Italy) **A Seppi**	**7**	6^{5}	**6**
(France) F Santoro	2	1
12	(Argentina) **G Cañas**	**6**	**6**
16	(Czech Republic) **R Štěpánek**	**7^{7}**	**6**
(France) C Saulnier	6^{5}	2
(Germany) T Haas	4	5
(Slovakia) **D Hrbatý**	**6**	**7**
Q	(France) **R Gasquet**	**6**	**1**
(Croatia) I Karlović	1	0	r
(Chile) **N Massú**	**7^{7}**	4	**7**
2	(United States) A Roddick	6^{4}	**6**	5

Second round
LL	(Argentina) J Mónaco	3	**6**	6^{6}
(Czech Republic) **J Novák**	**6**	4	**7^{8}**
Q	(Italy) **A Seppi**	**7^{11}**	**6**
12	(Argentina) G Cañas	6^{9}	2
16	(Czech Republic) R Štěpánek	5	6^{2}
(Slovakia) **D Hrbatý**	**7**	**7^{7}**
Q	(France) **R Gasquet**	2	**6**	**6**
(Chile) N Massú	**6**	2	2

Third round
(Czech Republic) J Novák	3	4
Q	(Italy) **A Seppi**	**6**	**6**
(Slovakia) D Hrbatý	1	2
Q	(France) **R Gasquet**	**6**	**6**

Quarterfinals
Q	(Italy) A Seppi	1	2
Q	(France) **R Gasquet**	**6**	**6**

== Qualifying ==
=== Qualifying seeds ===
1. (Spain) **Juan Carlos Ferrero (qualified)**
2. (Argentina) **Mariano Puerta (qualified)**
3. (France) **Richard Gasquet (qualified)**
4. (United States) Kevin Kim (first round)
5. (Belgium) **Christophe Rochus (qualified)**
6. (France) Paul-Henri Mathieu (qualifying competition, **lucky loser**)
7. (Argentina) Juan Mónaco (qualifying competition, **lucky loser**)
8. (Spain) **Santiago Ventura (qualified)**
9. (United States) Robby Ginepri (first round)
10. (Spain) Guillermo García López (qualifying competition)
11. (Italy) Davide Sanguinetti (qualifying competition)
12. (Spain) Félix Mantilla (first round)
13. (Spain) Álex Calatrava (qualifying competition)
14. (n/a)
15. (Spain) Óscar Hernández (qualifying competition)
16. (Germany) Tomas Behrend (qualifying competition)

=== Qualifiers ===
1. (Spain) **Juan Carlos Ferrero**
2. (Argentina) **Mariano Puerta**
3. (France) **Richard Gasquet**
4. (Italy) **Andreas Seppi**
5. (Belgium) **Christophe Rochus**
6. (Spain) **Nicolás Almagro**
7. (Spain) **David Sánchez**
8. (Spain) **Santiago Ventura**

=== Lucky losers ===
1. (France) **Paul-Henri Mathieu** (replaces Carlos Moyá)
2. (Argentina) **Juan Mónaco** (replaces Rafael Nadal)

=== Qualifying draw ===
==== First qualifier ====
First round
1	**(Spain) Juan Carlos Ferrero**	**7^{13}**	**6**
(France) Gilles Simon	6^{11}	3
WC	(Germany) Frank Wintermantel	2	**6**	5
15	**(Spain) Óscar Hernández**	**6**	2	**7**

Qualifying competition
1	**(Spain) Juan Carlos Ferrero**	**6**	**6**
15	(Spain) Óscar Hernández	0	1

==== Second qualifier ====
First round
2	**(Argentina) Mariano Puerta**	**6**	**6**
(Switzerland) Ivo Heuberger	2	2
(France) Jean-René Lisnard	**7**	3	2
16	**(Germany) Tomas Behrend**	5	**6**	**6**

Qualifying competition
2	**(Argentina) Mariano Puerta**	**7**	**6**
16	(Germany) Tomas Behrend	5	4

==== Third qualifier ====
First round
3	**(France) Richard Gasquet**	**6**	**6**
WC	(Germany) Tobias Summerer	1	2
(Switzerland) Stanislas Wawrinka	2	5
11	**(Italy) Davide Sanguinetti**	**6**	**7**

Qualifying competition
3	**(France) Richard Gasquet**	**6**	**6**
11	(Italy) Davide Sanguinetti	1	2

==== Fourth qualifier ====
First round
4	(United States) Kevin Kim	6^{1}	2
**(France) Thierry Ascione**	**7^{7}**	**6**
**(Italy) Andreas Seppi**	**7**	**6**
12	(Spain) Félix Mantilla	5	1

Qualifying competition
(France) Thierry Ascione	5	4
**(Italy) Andreas Seppi**	**7**	**6**

==== Fifth qualifier ====
First round
5	**(Belgium) Christophe Rochus**	**7**	**6**
WC	(Germany) Sebastian Rieschick	5	4
(France) Grégory Carraz	6^{8}	5
13	**(Spain) Álex Calatrava**	**7^{10}**	**7**

Qualifying competition
5	**(Belgium) Christophe Rochus**	**6**	4	**6**
13	(Spain) Álex Calatrava	3	**6**	0

==== Sixth qualifier ====
First round
6	**(France) Paul-Henri Mathieu**	**6**	**6**
(Germany) Alexander Popp	2	0
**(Spain) Nicolás Almagro**	3	**7^{7}**	**6**
9	(United States) Robby Ginepri	**6**	6^{3}	2

Qualifying competition
6	(France) Paul-Henri Mathieu	2	2
**(Spain) Nicolás Almagro**	**6**	**6**

==== Seventh qualifier ====
First round
7	**(Argentina) Juan Mónaco**	**6**	**7**
Alt	(Ecuador) Nicolás Lapentti	4	5
**(Spain) David Sánchez**	3	**6**	**6**
Alt	(Japan) Takao Suzuki	**6**	2	3

Qualifying competition
7	(Argentina) Juan Mónaco	6^{5}	0
**(Spain) David Sánchez**	**7^{7}**	**6**

==== Eighth qualifier ====
First round
8	**(Spain) Santiago Ventura**	**6**	4	**7**
WC	(Germany) Mischa Zverev	2	**6**	5
(Germany) Björn Phau	6^{6}	4
10	**(Spain) Guillermo García López**	**7^{8}**	**6**

Qualifying competition
8	**(Spain) Santiago Ventura**	4	**6**	**7**
10	(Spain) Guillermo García López	**6**	2	5
