= 2005 Mutua Madrileña Masters Madrid – Singles =

Singles
- 2005 Mutua Madrileña Masters Madrid

Final
- Champion: (Spain) Rafael Nadal
- Runner-up: (Croatia) Ivan Ljubičić
- Score: 3–6, 2–6, 6–3, 6–4, 7–6^{(7–3)}

Details
- Draw: 48
- Seeds: 16

Events
| Singles | Doubles |
- Madrid Open

Rafael Nadal defeated Ivan Ljubičić in the final, 3–6, 2–6, 6–3, 6–4, 7–6^{(7–3)} to win the singles tennis title at the 2005 Madrid Open. This would remain his sole indoor hardcourt title for the entirety of his career.

Marat Safin was the reigning champion, but chose not to compete.

== Seeds ==
A champion seed is indicated in bold text while text in italics indicates the round in which that seed was eliminated. All sixteen seeds received a bye into the second round.

1. (Spain) **Rafael Nadal (champion)**
2. (United States) Andy Roddick (second round)
3. (Russia) Nikolay Davydenko (third round)
4. (Argentina) Guillermo Coria (third round)
5. (Argentina) David Nalbandian (semifinals)
6. (Argentina) Mariano Puerta (third round)
7. (Argentina) Gastón Gaudio (second round)
8. (Croatia) Ivan Ljubičić (final)
9. (Sweden) Thomas Johansson (third round)
10. (Czech Republic) Radek Štěpánek (quarterfinals)
11. (Spain) David Ferrer (quarterfinals)
12. (Croatia) Mario Ančić (second round)
13. (Spain) Tommy Robredo (third round)
14. (Slovakia) Dominik Hrbatý (third round)
15. (Chile) Fernando González (quarterfinals)
16. (United States) Robby Ginepri (semifinals)

== Draw ==
Key

- Q = Qualifier
- WC = Wild card
- LL = Lucky loser
- Alt = Alternate
- ITF = ITF entry
- PR = Protected ranking
- SR = Special ranking
- SE = Special exempt
- JE = Junior exempt
- JR = Junior Accelerator Programme entrant
- CO = College Accelerator Programme entrant
- NG = Next Gen Accelerator Program entrant
- w/o = Walkover
- r = Retired
- d = Defaulted

=== Finals ===
Quarterfinals
1 | **(Spain) Rafael Nadal** | **7^{11}** | **6**
10 | (Czech Republic) Radek Štěpánek | 6^{9} | 4
16 | **(United States) Robby Ginepri** | **6** | **6**
11 | (Spain) David Ferrer | 1 | 4
8 | **(Croatia) Ivan Ljubičić** | 4 | **7^{7}** | **6**
15 | (Chile) Fernando González | **6** | 6^{2} | 4
5 | **(Argentina) David Nalbandian** | **6** | **7^{7}**
Q | (Croatia) Ivo Karlović | 4 | 6^{4}

Semifinals
1 | (Spain) **Rafael Nadal** | **7** | **7^{7}**
16 | (United States) Robby Ginepri | 5 | 6^{1}
8 | (Croatia) **Ivan Ljubičić** | **6** | 3 | **6**
5 | (Argentina) David Nalbandian | 3 | **6** | 3

Final
1 | (Spain) **Rafael Nadal** | 3 | 2 | **6** | **6** | **7^{7}**
8 | (Croatia) Ivan Ljubičić | **6** | **6** | 3 | 4 | 6^{3}

=== Top half ===
==== Section 1 ====
First round
(Romania) **V Hănescu** | **6** | **6**
Q | (Czech Republic) T Zíb | 1 | 4
(Italy) F Volandri | 1 | 2
(Spain) **C Moyà** | **6** | **6**
(United Kingdom) **T Henman** | **6** | **6**
(United States) T Dent | 2 | 4
(Russia) M Youzhny | **7^{7}** | 4 | 0/r
(Argentina) **J Acasuso** | 6^{5} | **6** | **2**

Second round
1 | (Spain) **R Nadal** | **7^{7}** | **6**
(Romania) V Hănescu | 6^{5} | 3
(Spain) C Moyà | 4 | **6** | 1
13 | (Spain) **T Robredo** | **6** | 3 | **6**
10 | (Czech Republic) **R Štěpánek** | **6** | 1 | **6**
(United Kingdom) T Henman | 4 | **6** | 3
(Argentina) **J Acasuso** | **7^{7}** | **6**
7 | (Argentina) G Gaudio | 6^{4} | 2

Third round
1 | (Spain) **R Nadal** | **6** | **6**
13 | (Spain) T Robredo | 2 | 4
10 | (Czech Republic) **R Štěpánek** | **7^{7}** | 4 | **7^{7}**
(Argentina) J Acasuso | 6^{3} | **6** | 6^{5}

Quarterfinals
1 | (Spain) **R Nadal** | **7^{11}** | **6**
10 | (Czech Republic) R Štěpánek | 6^{9} | 4

==== Section 2 ====
First round
(Germany) N Kiefer | 2 | 1 | r
(Slovakia) **K Beck** | **6** | **2**
(Spain) F López | 5 | **6** | 2
(France) **S Grosjean** | **7** | 4 | **6**
Q | (Argentina) **A Calleri** | **6** | **7**
WC | (Spain) Á Costa | 0 | 5
(Spain) J C Ferrero | 5 | 6^{2}
(Belarus) **M Mirnyi** | **7** | **7^{7}**

Second round
3 | (Russia) **N Davydenko** | **6** | **6**
(Slovakia) K Beck | 4 | 1
(France) S Grosjean | **6** | 4 | 4
16 | (United States) **R Ginepri** | 4 | **6** | **6**
11 | (Spain) **D Ferrer** | **6** | 4 | **6**
Q | (Argentina) A Calleri | 3 | **6** | 4
(Belarus) M Mirnyi | 6^{5} | 6^{5}
6 | (Argentina) **M Puerta** | **7^{7}** | **7^{7}**

Third round
3 | (Russia) N Davydenko | 3 | 5
16 | (United States) **R Ginepri** | **6** | **7**
11 | (Spain) **D Ferrer** | 6^{5} | **6** | **6**
6 | (Argentina) M Puerta | **7^{7}** | 1 | 4

Quarterfinals
16 | (United States) **R Ginepri** | **6** | **6**
11 | (Spain) D Ferrer | 1 | 4

=== Bottom half ===
==== Section 3 ====
First round
(Czech Republic) J Novák | **6** | 6^{1} | 4
Q | (Spain) **A Martín** | 3 | **7^{7}** | **6**
(Czech Republic) T Berdych | **6** | 6^{6} | 3
(Belgium) **O Rochus** | 1 | **7^{8}** | **6**
(France) P-H Mathieu | 4 | **6** | 3
WC | (Spain) **F Verdasco** | **6** | 3 | **6**
(France) G Monfils | 4 | 4
Q | (Belgium) **C Rochus** | **6** | **6**

Second round
8 | (Croatia) **I Ljubičić** | **6** | **7^{9}**
Q | (Spain) A Martín | 3 | 6^{7}
(Belgium) **O Rochus** | 1 | **6** | **7^{7}**
12 | (Croatia) M Ančić | **6** | 4 | 6^{5}
15 | (Chile) **F González** | **6** | 1 | **6**
WC | (Spain) F Verdasco | 3 | **6** | 3
Q | (Belgium) C Rochus | 3 | 4
4 | (Argentina) **G Coria** | **6** | **6**

Third round
8 | (Croatia) **I Ljubičić** | **6** | **6**
(Belgium) O Rochus | 4 | 4
15 | (Chile) **F González** | **7** | **6**
4 | (Argentina) G Coria | 5 | 3

Quarterfinals
8 | (Croatia) **I Ljubičić** | 4 | **7^{7}** | **6**
15 | (Chile) F González | **6** | 6^{2} | 4

==== Section 4 ====
First round
(Austria) **J Melzer** | 3 | **6** | **6**
(United States) V Spadea | **6** | 4 | 4
WC | (Chile) N Massú | 2 | 3
Q | (Argentina) **J I Chela** | **6** | **6**
(Germany) **T Haas** | **7^{7}** | **6**
(Romania) A Pavel | 6^{4} | 2
Q | (Croatia) **I Karlović** | 6^{5} | **7^{7}** | **7^{7}**
(United Kingdom) G Rusedski | **7^{7}** | 6^{2} | 6^{3}

Second round
5 | (Argentina) **D Nalbandian** | **7^{7}** | **6**
(Austria) J Melzer | 6^{1} | 3
Q | (Argentina) J I Chela | 6^{2} | 3
9 | (Sweden) **T Johansson** | **7^{7}** | **6**
14 | (Slovakia) **D Hrbatý** | **6** | **6**
(Germany) T Haas | 4 | 2
Q | (Croatia) **I Karlović** | 3 | **7^{9}** | **7^{7}**
2 | (United States) A Roddick | **6** | 6^{7} | 6^{3}

Third round
5 | (Argentina) **D Nalbandian** | **6** | **7**
9 | (Sweden) T Johansson | 3 | 5
14 | (Slovakia) D Hrbatý | 6^{9} | 6^{3}
Q | (Croatia) **I Karlović** | **7^{11}** | **7^{7}**

Quarterfinals
5 | (Argentina) **D Nalbandian** | **6** | **7^{7}**
Q | (Croatia) I Karlović | 4 | 6^{4}

== Qualifying ==
=== Seeds ===
1. (Argentina) **Juan Ignacio Chela (qualified)**
2. (Belgium) **Christophe Rochus (qualified)**
3. (France) Florent Serra (qualifying competition)
4. (Spain) **Alberto Martín (qualified)**
5. (Argentina) **Agustín Calleri (qualified)**
6. (Czech Republic) **Tomáš Zíb (qualified)**
7. (Italy) Andreas Seppi (qualifying competition)
8. (Czech Republic) Ivo Minář (first round)
9. (Czech Republic) Jan Hernych (first round)
10. (Ecuador) Nicolás Lapentti (first round)
11. (Croatia) **Ivo Karlović (qualified)**
12. (Romania) Răzvan Sabău (qualifying competition)

=== Qualifiers ===
1. **(Argentina) Juan Ignacio Chela**
2. **(Belgium) Christophe Rochus**
3. **(Croatia) Ivo Karlović**
4. **(Spain) Alberto Martín**
5. **(Argentina) Agustín Calleri**
6. **(Czech Republic) Tomáš Zíb**

=== Qualifying draw ===
==== First qualifier ====
First round
1 | **(Argentina) Juan Ignacio Chela** | **6** | **6**
(Argentina) Juan Mónaco | 3 | 1
WC | **(Morocco) Younes El Aynaoui** | **6** | **7^{6}**
10 | (Ecuador) Nicolás Lapentti | 3 | 6^{3}

Qualifying competition
1 | **(Argentina) Juan Ignacio Chela** | **6** | 3 | **7^{6}**
WC | (Morocco) Younes El Aynaoui | 4 | **6** | 6^{1}

==== Second qualifier ====
First round
2 | **(Belgium) Christophe Rochus** | **7^{7}** | **6**
WC | (Spain) Quino Muñoz | 6^{3} | 3
(Brazil) Ricardo Mello | 1 | 4
7 | **(Italy) Andreas Seppi** | **6** | **6**

Qualifying competition
2 | **(Belgium) Christophe Rochus** | 3
7 | (Italy) Andreas Seppi | 0^{r}

==== Third qualifier ====
First round
3 | **(France) Florent Serra** | **6** | **6**
WC | (Spain) Oscar Burrieza-Lopez | 2 | 4
(Serbia and Montenegro) Novak Djokovic | 4 | 4
11 | **(Croatia) Ivo Karlović** | **6** | **6**

Qualifying competition
3 | (France) Florent Serra | 6^{2} | 4
11 | **(Croatia) Ivo Karlović** | **7^{7}** | **6**

==== Fourth qualifier ====
First round
4 | **(Spain) Alberto Martín** | **7^{7}** | 4 | **6**
(France) Thierry Ascione | 6^{3} | **6** | 3
**(Spain) Nicolás Almagro** | 3 | **6** | **6**
9 | (Czech Republic) Jan Hernych | **6** | 3 | 0

Qualifying competition
4 | **(Spain) Alberto Martín** | **6** | **7**
13 | (Spain) Nicolás Almagro | 4 | 5

==== Fifth qualifier ====
First round
5 | **(Argentina) Agustín Calleri** | **7** | **6**
(France) Gilles Simon | 5 | 0
**(Spain) Guillermo García López** | **7** | 4
8 | (Czech Republic) Ivo Minář | 5 | 1^{r}

Qualifying competition
5 | **(Argentina) Agustín Calleri** | **6** | **6**
(Spain) Guillermo García López | 2 | 2

==== Sixth qualifier ====
First round
6 | **(Czech Republic) Tomáš Zíb** | **6** | **6**
WC | (Spain) Tati Rascón | 4 | 3
(Greece) Vasilis Mazarakis | 3 | 1
12 | **(Romania) Răzvan Sabău** | **6** | **6**

Qualifying competition
6 | **(Czech Republic) Tomáš Zíb** | **6** | **6**
12 | (Romania) Răzvan Sabău | 1 | 3
