= 2005 Monte Carlo Masters =

- Date: 11–17 April
- Edition: 99th
- Category: ATP Masters Series
- Draw: 64S / 24D
- Prize money: $2,220,000
- Surface: Clay / outdoor
- Location: Roquebrune-Cap-Martin, France
- Venue: Monte Carlo Country Club

Champions

Singles
- (Spain) Rafael Nadal

Doubles
- (India) Leander Paes / (Serbia and Montenegro) Nenad Zimonjić
← 2004 ·	Monte Carlo Masters	· 2006 →

The 2005 Monte Carlo Masters was a men's tennis tournament played on outdoor clay courts. It was the 99th edition of the event and was part of the ATP Masters Series of the 2005 ATP Tour. It took place at the Monte Carlo Country Club in Roquebrune-Cap-Martin, France from 11 April through 17 April 2005. The men's singles was headlined by world No. 1 Roger Federer, Marat Safin and Tim Henman. Rafael Nadal won the singles title.

== Finals ==
=== Singles ===
(Spain) Rafael Nadal defeated (Argentina) Guillermo Coria, 6–3, 6–1, 0–6, 7–5

=== Doubles ===
(India) Leander Paes / (Serbia and Montenegro) Nenad Zimonjić defeated (United States) Bob Bryan / (United States) Mike Bryan, walkover
