= 2005 BNP Paribas Masters – Singles =

Singles
- 2005 BNP Paribas Masters

Final
- Champion: (Czech Republic) Tomáš Berdych
- Runner-up: (Croatia) Ivan Ljubičić
- Score: 6–3, 6–4, 3–6, 4–6, 6–4

Details
- Draw: 48 (6 Q / 3 WC / 2 LL)
- Seeds: 16

Events
Singles	Doubles
- Paris Masters

Tomáš Berdych defeated Ivan Ljubičić in the final, 6–3, 6–4, 3–6, 4–6, 6–4 to win the singles tennis title at the 2005 Paris Masters.

Marat Safin was the reigning champion, but did not compete.

== Seeds ==
A champion seed is indicated in bold text while text in italics indicates the round in which that seed was eliminated. All sixteen seeds received a bye into the second round.

1. (United States) Andy Roddick (semifinals)
2. (Argentina) Guillermo Coria (second round)
3. (Russia) Nikolay Davydenko (quarterfinals)
4. (Argentina) ~~Mariano Puerta (second round)~~
5. (Argentina) David Nalbandian (second round)
6. (Croatia) Ivan Ljubičić (final)
7. (Argentina) Gastón Gaudio (quarterfinals)
8. (Czech Republic) Radek Štěpánek (semifinals)
9. (Sweden) Thomas Johansson (third round)
10. (Spain) David Ferrer (quarterfinals)
11. (Chile) Fernando González (second round)
12. (United States) Robby Ginepri (third round)
13. (Spain) Juan Carlos Ferrero (third round)
14. (Spain) Tommy Robredo (quarterfinals)
15. (Croatia) Mario Ančić (second round)
16. (Slovakia) Dominik Hrbatý (third round)

== Draw ==
Key

- Q = Qualifier
- WC = Wild card
- LL = Lucky loser
- Alt = Alternate
- ITF = ITF entry
- PR = Protected ranking
- SR = Special ranking
- SE = Special exempt
- JE = Junior exempt
- JR = Junior Accelerator Programme entrant
- CO = College Accelerator Programme entrant
- NG = Next Gen Accelerator Program entrant
- w/o = Walkover
- r = Retired
- d = Defaulted

=== Finals ===
Quarterfinals
1	**(United States) Andy Roddick**	2	**6**	**7^{10}**
10	(Spain) David Ferrer	**6**	3	6^{8}
14	(Spain) Tommy Robredo	6^{6}	**6**	1
6	**(Croatia) Ivan Ljubičić**	**7^{8}**	3	**6**
8	**(Czech Republic) Radek Štěpánek**	**7**	**6**
3	(Russia) Nikolay Davydenko	5	4
7	(Argentina) Gastón Gaudio	5	0
**(Czech Republic) Tomáš Berdych**	**7**	**6**

Semifinals
1	(United States) Andy Roddick	3	5
6	**(Croatia) Ivan Ljubičić**	**6**	**7**
8	(Czech Republic) Radek Štěpánek	1	**6**	3
**(Czech Republic) Tomáš Berdych**	**6**	3	**6**

Final
6	(Croatia) Ivan Ljubičić	3	4	**6**	**6**	4
**(Czech Republic) Tomáš Berdych**	**6**	**6**	3	4	**6**

=== Top half ===
==== Section 1 ====
First round
(France) S Grosjean	4	6^{4}
(United States) **T Dent**	**6**	**7^{7}**
Q	(France) N Mahut	3	**6**	6^{5}
LL	(France) **J-R Lisnard**	**6**	1	**7^{7}**
(Chile) N Massú	2	3
(Belarus) **M Mirnyi**	**6**	**6**
(Romania) A Pavel	6^{6}	4
(Germany) **T Haas**	**7^{8}**	**6**

Second round
1	(United States) **A Roddick**	**6**	6^{2}	**7**
(United States) T Dent	4	**7^{7}**	5
LL	(France) J-R Lisnard	3	3
16	(Slovakia) **D Hrbatý**	**6**	**6**
10	(Spain) **D Ferrer**	**6**	**6**
(Belarus) M Mirnyi	4	4
(Germany) **T Haas**	**6**	**6**
5	(Argentina) D Nalbandian	4	3

Third round
1	(United States) **A Roddick**	**6**	**6**
16	(Slovakia) D Hrbatý	1	2
10	(Spain) **D Ferrer**	**6**	6^{3}	**6**
(Germany) T Haas	2	**7^{7}**	3

Quarterfinals
1	(United States) **A Roddick**	2	**6**	**7^{10}**
10	(Spain) D Ferrer	**6**	3	6^{8}

==== Section 2 ====
First round
Q	(Serbia and Montenegro) **N Djokovic**	4
(Romania) V Hănescu	1^{r}
WC	(France) **A Clément**	**6**	1	**7^{8}**
(Germany) N Kiefer	4	**6**	6^{6}
Q	(Belgium) **K Vliegen**	3	**7^{7}**	**6**
(Belgium) C Rochus	**6**	6^{3}	2
(Belgium) O Rochus	4	3
(United States) **J Blake**	**6**	**6**

Second round
4	(Argentina) ~~M Puerta~~	3	6^{9}
Q	(Serbia and Montenegro) **N Djokovic**	**6**	**7^{11}**
WC	(France) A Clément	5	2
14	(Spain) **T Robredo**	**7**	**6**
9	(Sweden) **T Johansson**	**6**	**6**
Q	(Belgium) K Vliegen	3	2
(United States) J Blake	3	4
6	(Croatia) **I Ljubičić**	**6**	**6**

Third round
Q	(Serbia and Montenegro) N Djokovic	4	3
14	(Spain) **T Robredo**	**6**	**6**
9	(Sweden) T Johansson	3	6^{4}
6	(Croatia) **I Ljubičić**	**6**	**7^{7}**

Quarterfinals
14	(Spain) T Robredo	6^{6}	**6**	1
6	(Croatia) **I Ljubičić**	**7^{8}**	3	**6**

=== Bottom half ===
==== Section 3 ====
First round
(Spain) **F López**	4	**7^{7}**	**6**
(Belgium) X Malisse	**6**	6^{2}	4
(Italy) D Sanguinetti	**7**	6^{4}	4
(France) **P-H Mathieu**	5	**7^{7}**	**6**
Q	(Russia) **D Tursunov**	**6**	**6**
(United States) V Spadea	1	2
(United Kingdom) **G Rusedski**	**6**	**6**
Q	(Italy) A Seppi	3	4

Second round
8	(Czech Republic) **R Štěpánek**	**7**	**6**
(Spain) F López	5	2
(France) **P-H Mathieu**	**6**	3	**7^{7}**
11	(Chile) F González	3	**6**	6^{4}
15	(Croatia) M Ančić	**7**	4	6^{3}
Q	(Russia) **D Tursunov**	5	**6**	**7^{7}**
(United Kingdom) G Rusedski	2	2
3	(Russia) **N Davydenko**	**6**	**6**

Third round
8	(Czech Republic) **R Štěpánek**	**7**	**6**
(France) P-H Mathieu	5	4
Q	(Russia) D Tursunov	**6**	2	3
3	(Russia) **N Davydenko**	3	**6**	**6**

Quarterfinals
8	(Czech Republic) **R Štěpánek**	**7**	**6**
3	(Russia) N Davydenko	5	4

==== Section 4 ====
First round
(Finland) J Nieminen	**7^{10}**	6^{4}	3
WC	(France) **F Santoro**	6^{8}	**7^{7}**	**6**
Q	(Ecuador) N Lapentti	**7^{7}**	5	5
(Spain) **F Verdasco**	6^{5}	**7**	**7**
LL	(Switzerland) **S Wawrinka**	**6**	**6**
WC	(France) F Serra	3	4
(Czech Republic) **T Berdych**	**7**	**6**
(Czech Republic) J Novák	5	3

Second round
7	(Argentina) **G Gaudio**	**6**	**7**
WC	(France) F Santoro	4	5
(Spain) F Verdasco	3	**7^{9}**	3
12	(United States) **R Ginepri**	**6**	6^{7}	**6**
13	(Spain) **J C Ferrero**	**7^{7}**	**7^{7}**
LL	(Switzerland) S Wawrinka	6^{4}	6^{4}
(Czech Republic) **T Berdych**	**6**	**6**
2	(Argentina) G Coria	4	2

Third round
7	(Argentina) **G Gaudio**	**6**	**6**
12	(United States) R Ginepri	4	1
13	(Spain) J C Ferrero	5	**7^{9}**	4
(Czech Republic) **T Berdych**	**7**	6^{7}	**6**

Quarterfinals
7	(Argentina) G Gaudio	5	0
(Czech Republic) **T Berdych**	**7**	**6**

== Qualifying ==
=== Qualifying seeds ===
1. (Thailand) Paradorn Srichaphan (first round)
2. (Switzerland) Stanislas Wawrinka (qualifying competition, **lucky loser**)
3. (Czech Republic) Tomáš Zíb (first round)
4. (Italy) **Andreas Seppi (qualified)**
5. (France) Cyril Saulnier (first round, retired)
6. (Czech Republic) Ivo Minář (first round)
7. (Russia) **Dmitry Tursunov (qualified)**
8. (Czech Republic) Jan Hernych (first round)
9. (Italy) Daniele Bracciali (first round)
10. (Ecuador) **Nicolás Lapentti (qualified)**
11. (Romania) Răzvan Sabău (first round)
12. (Serbia and Montenegro) **Novak Djokovic (qualified)**

=== Qualifiers ===
1. (Serbia and Montenegro) **Novak Djokovic**
2. (Belgium) **Kristof Vliegen**
3. (France) **Nicolas Mahut**
4. (Italy) **Andreas Seppi**
5. (Russia) **Dmitry Tursunov**
6. (Ecuador) **Nicolás Lapentti**

=== Lucky losers ===
1. (Switzerland) **Stanislas Wawrinka**
2. (France) **Jean-René Lisnard**

=== Qualifying draw ===
==== First qualifier ====
First round
1	(Thailand) Paradorn Srichaphan	**7**	3	1
**(France) Jean-René Lisnard**	5	**6**	**6**
(France) Jérôme Haehnel	3	4
12	**(Serbia and Montenegro) Novak Djokovic**	**6**	**6**

Qualifying competition
(France) Jean-René Lisnard	**6**	1	4
12	**(Serbia and Montenegro) Novak Djokovic**	4	**6**	**6**

==== Second qualifier ====
First round
2	**(Switzerland) Stanislas Wawrinka**	**7^{7}**	6^{2}	**6**
(Spain) Guillermo García López	6^{4}	**7^{7}**	3
**(Belgium) Kristof Vliegen**	**6**	**6**
8	(Czech Republic) Jan Hernych	4	4

Qualifying competition
2	(Switzerland) Stanislas Wawrinka	4	**6**	4
**(Belgium) Kristof Vliegen**	**6**	2	**6**

==== Third qualifier ====
First round
3	(Czech Republic) Tomáš Zíb	4	3
WC	**(France) Nicolas Mahut**	**6**	**6**
**(France) Antony Dupuis**	**6**	**7^{7}**
11	(Romania) Răzvan Sabău	4	6^{2}

Qualifying competition
WC	**(France) Nicolas Mahut**	6^{3}	**7^{7}**	**7^{7}**
(France) Antony Dupuis	**7^{7}**	6^{2}	6^{4}

==== Fourth qualifier ====
First round
4	**(Italy) Andreas Seppi**	**6**	**7**
(Switzerland) George Bastl	4	5
**(Austria) Stefan Koubek**	**7^{15}**	**6**
9	(Italy) Daniele Bracciali	6^{13}	1

Qualifying competition
4	**(Italy) Andreas Seppi**	**7^{13}**	**6**
(Austria) Stefan Koubek	6^{11}	0

==== Fifth qualifier ====
First round
5	(France) Cyril Saulnier	1^{r}
WC	**(France) Marc Gicquel**	**6**
WC	(Sweden) Thomas Enqvist	6^{2}	4
7	**(Russia) Dmitry Tursunov**	**7^{7}**	**6**

Qualifying competition
WC	(France) Marc Gicquel	3	4
7	**(Russia) Dmitry Tursunov**	**6**	**6**

==== Sixth qualifier ====
First round
6	(Czech Republic) Ivo Minář	3	6^{12}
WC	**(France) Julien Benneteau**	**6**	**7^{14}**
(France) Gilles Simon	6^{3}	**6**	4
10	**(Ecuador) Nicolás Lapentti**	**7^{7}**	4	**6**

Qualifying competition
WC	(France) Julien Benneteau	3	6^{4}
10	**(Ecuador) Nicolás Lapentti**	**6**	**7^{7}**
