= 2006 ATP Tour =

Men's tennis circuit

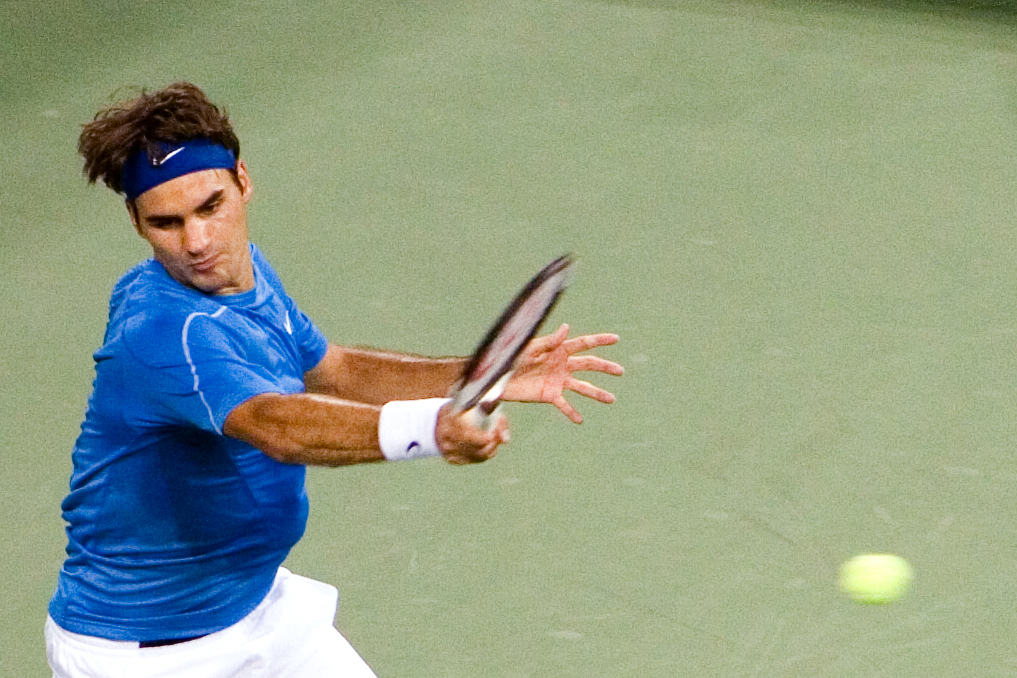
- Roger Federer finished the year ranked world No. 1 for the third time in his career. He won twelve tournaments during the season, including three majors at the Australian Open, the Wimbledon Championships, and the US Open, as well as the Tennis Masters Cup. He also won four Masters Series events and finished runner-up at the fourth major, the French Open.

Details
- Duration: 30 December 2005 – 13 November 2006
- Edition: 37th
- Tournaments: 66
- Categories: Grand Slam (4); ATP Masters Series (9); ATP International Series Gold (9); ATP International Series (44)

Achievements (singles)
- Most titles: (Switzerland) Roger Federer (12)
- Most finals: (Switzerland) Roger Federer (16)
- Prize money leader: (Switzerland) Roger Federer ($8,343,885)
- Points leader: (Switzerland) Roger Federer (8,370)

Awards
- Player of the year: (Switzerland) Roger Federer
- Doubles team of the year: (United States) Bob Bryan (United States) Mike Bryan
- Most improved player of the year: (Serbia) Novak Djokovic
- Newcomer of the year: (Germany) Benjamin Becker
- Comeback player of the year: (United States) Mardy Fish

The 2006 ATP Tour was the global elite men's professional tennis circuit organised by the Association of Tennis Professionals (ATP) for the 2006 tennis season. The ATP Tour is the elite tour for professional tennis organized by the Association of Tennis Professionals. The ATP Tour includes the four Grand Slam tournaments, the Tennis Masters Cup, the ATP Masters Series, the International Series Gold and the International Series tournaments.

In singles, Roger Federer dominated the season. He won twelve tournaments, including three majors (Australian Open, Wimbledon and the US Open), four Masters Series titles (Indian Wells, Miami Open, Madrid Open and Rogers Cup) and the year-end championship. He finished the year with a 92–5 record.

== Calendar ==
The table below shows the 2006 ATP Tour schedule

Key

Grand Slam tournaments
Tennis Masters Cup
ATP Masters Series
ATP International Series Gold
ATP International Series
Team events

=== January ===
Week	Tournament	Champions	Runners-up	Semifinalists	Quarterfinalists
2 Jan	Hopman Cup; Perth, Australia; Hopman Cup; Hard (i) – 8 teams (RR)	United States; 2–1	Netherlands	Round robin losers (Group A) Serbia and Montenegro; Sweden; Russia	Round robin losers (Group B) Australia; Argentina; Germany
2 Jan	Next Generation Adelaide International; Adelaide, Australia; ATP International Series $394,000 – hard Singles – Doubles	(France) Florent Serra; 6–3, 6–4	(Belgium) Xavier Malisse	(Czech Republic) Tomáš Berdych (Slovakia) Dominik Hrbatý	(Germany) Philipp Kohlschreiber (Italy) Andreas Seppi (Finland) Jarkko Nieminen (Denmark) Kenneth Carlsen
2 Jan	Next Generation Adelaide International; Adelaide, Australia; ATP International Series $394,000 – hard Singles – Doubles	(Israel) Jonathan Erlich (Israel) Andy Ram; 7–6^{(7–4)}, 7–6^{(12–10)}	(Australia) Paul Hanley (Zimbabwe) Kevin Ullyett	(Czech Republic) Tomáš Berdych (Slovakia) Dominik Hrbatý	(Germany) Philipp Kohlschreiber (Italy) Andreas Seppi (Finland) Jarkko Nieminen (Denmark) Kenneth Carlsen
2 Jan	Chennai Open; Chennai, India; ATP International Series $355,000 – hard Singles – Doubles	(Croatia) Ivan Ljubičić; 7–6^{(8–6)}, 6–2	(Spain) Carlos Moyá	(Belgium) Kristof Vliegen (Czech Republic) Radek Štěpánek	(Luxembourg) Gilles Müller (Thailand) Paradorn Srichaphan (Germany) Björn Phau (France) Thierry Ascione
2 Jan	Chennai Open; Chennai, India; ATP International Series $355,000 – hard Singles – Doubles	(Slovakia) Michal Mertiňák (Czech Republic) Petr Pála; 6–2, 7–5	(India) Prakash Amritraj (India) Rohan Bopanna	(Belgium) Kristof Vliegen (Czech Republic) Radek Štěpánek	(Luxembourg) Gilles Müller (Thailand) Paradorn Srichaphan (Germany) Björn Phau (France) Thierry Ascione
2 Jan	Qatar ExxonMobil Open; Doha, Qatar; ATP International Series $1,000,000 – hard Singles – Doubles	(Switzerland) Roger Federer; 6–3, 7–6^{(7–5)}	(France) Gaël Monfils	(Germany) Tommy Haas (Italy) Filippo Volandri	(Cyprus) Marcos Baghdatis (Russia) Mikhail Youzhny (Russia) Dmitry Tursunov (Russia) Nikolay Davydenko
2 Jan	Qatar ExxonMobil Open; Doha, Qatar; ATP International Series $1,000,000 – hard Singles – Doubles	(Sweden) Jonas Björkman (Belarus) Max Mirnyi; 2–6, 6–3, [10–8]	(Belgium) Christophe Rochus (Belgium) Olivier Rochus	(Germany) Tommy Haas (Italy) Filippo Volandri	(Cyprus) Marcos Baghdatis (Russia) Mikhail Youzhny (Russia) Dmitry Tursunov (Russia) Nikolay Davydenko
9 Jan	Heineken Open; Auckland, New Zealand; ATP International Series $405,000 – hard Singles – Doubles	(Finland) Jarkko Nieminen; 6–2, 6–2	(Croatia) Mario Ančić	(Switzerland) Stanislas Wawrinka (Belgium) Olivier Rochus	(Chile) Fernando González (Germany) Florian Mayer (Chile) Nicolás Massú (Spain) David Ferrer
9 Jan	Heineken Open; Auckland, New Zealand; ATP International Series $405,000 – hard Singles – Doubles	(Romania) Andrei Pavel (Netherlands) Rogier Wassen; 6–3, 5–7, [10–4]	(Sweden) Simon Aspelin (Australia) Todd Perry	(Switzerland) Stanislas Wawrinka (Belgium) Olivier Rochus	(Chile) Fernando González (Germany) Florian Mayer (Chile) Nicolás Massú (Spain) David Ferrer
9 Jan	Medibank International; Sydney, Australia; ATP International Series $394,000 – hard Singles – Doubles	(United States) James Blake; 6–2, 3–6, 7–6^{(7–3)}	(Russia) Igor Andreev	(Italy) Andreas Seppi (Russia) Nikolay Davydenko	(Australia) Lleyton Hewitt (Russia) Dmitry Tursunov (France) Arnaud Clément (Thailand) Paradorn Srichaphan
9 Jan	Medibank International; Sydney, Australia; ATP International Series $394,000 – hard Singles – Doubles	(France) Fabrice Santoro (Serbia and Montenegro) Nenad Zimonjić; 6–1, 6–4	(Czech Republic) František Čermák (Czech Republic) Leoš Friedl	(Italy) Andreas Seppi (Russia) Nikolay Davydenko	(Australia) Lleyton Hewitt (Russia) Dmitry Tursunov (France) Arnaud Clément (Thailand) Paradorn Srichaphan
16 Jan; 23 Jan	Australian Open; Melbourne, Australia; Grand Slam $6,784,589 – hard Singles – Doubles – Mixed doubles	(Switzerland) Roger Federer; 5–7, 7–5, 6–0, 6–2	(Cyprus) Marcos Baghdatis	(Germany) Nicolas Kiefer (Argentina) David Nalbandian	(Russia) Nikolay Davydenko (France) Sébastien Grosjean (France) Fabrice Santoro (Croatia) Ivan Ljubičić
16 Jan; 23 Jan	Australian Open; Melbourne, Australia; Grand Slam $6,784,589 – hard Singles – Doubles – Mixed doubles	(United States) Bob Bryan (United States) Mike Bryan; 4–6, 6–3, 6–4	(Czech Republic) Martin Damm (India) Leander Paes	(Germany) Nicolas Kiefer (Argentina) David Nalbandian	(Russia) Nikolay Davydenko (France) Sébastien Grosjean (France) Fabrice Santoro (Croatia) Ivan Ljubičić
16 Jan; 23 Jan	Australian Open; Melbourne, Australia; Grand Slam $6,784,589 – hard Singles – Doubles – Mixed doubles	(Switzerland) Martina Hingis (India) Mahesh Bhupathi; 6–3, 6–3	(Russia) Elena Likhovtseva (Canada) Daniel Nestor	(Germany) Nicolas Kiefer (Argentina) David Nalbandian	(Russia) Nikolay Davydenko (France) Sébastien Grosjean (France) Fabrice Santoro (Croatia) Ivan Ljubičić
30 Jan	PBZ Zagreb Indoors; Zagreb, Croatia; ATP International Series $380,000 – carpet (i); Singles – Doubles	(Croatia) Ivan Ljubičić; 6–3, 6–4	(Austria) Stefan Koubek	(Serbia and Montenegro) Novak Djokovic (United Kingdom) Tim Henman	(Russia) Mikhail Youzhny (Serbia and Montenegro) Ilija Bozoljac (Italy) Andreas Seppi (Croatia) Ivo Karlović
30 Jan	PBZ Zagreb Indoors; Zagreb, Croatia; ATP International Series $380,000 – carpet (i); Singles – Doubles	(Czech Republic) Jaroslav Levinský (Slovakia) Michal Mertiňák; 7–6^{(9–7)}, 6–1	(Italy) Davide Sanguinetti (Italy) Andreas Seppi	(Serbia and Montenegro) Novak Djokovic (United Kingdom) Tim Henman	(Russia) Mikhail Youzhny (Serbia and Montenegro) Ilija Bozoljac (Italy) Andreas Seppi (Croatia) Ivo Karlović
30 Jan	Movistar Open; Viña del Mar, Chile; ATP International Series $380,000 – clay Singles – Doubles	(Argentina) José Acasuso; 6–4, 6–3	(Chile) Nicolás Massú	(Spain) Rubén Ramírez Hidalgo (Chile) Fernando González	(Spain) Albert Montañés (Czech Republic) Leoš Friedl (Spain) Carlos Cuadrado (Serbia and Montenegro) Boris Pašanski
30 Jan	Movistar Open; Viña del Mar, Chile; ATP International Series $380,000 – clay Singles – Doubles	(Argentina) José Acasuso (Argentina) Sebastián Prieto; 7–6^{(7–2)}, 6–4	(Czech Republic) František Čermák (Czech Republic) Leoš Friedl	(Spain) Rubén Ramírez Hidalgo (Chile) Fernando González	(Spain) Albert Montañés (Czech Republic) Leoš Friedl (Spain) Carlos Cuadrado (Serbia and Montenegro) Boris Pašanski
30 Jan	Delray Beach International Tennis Championships; Delray Beach, USA; ATP International Series $380,000 – hard Singles – Doubles	(Germany) Tommy Haas; 6–3, 3–6, 7–6^{(7–5)}	(Belgium) Xavier Malisse	(Spain) Guillermo García López (United States) Vince Spadea	(United States) Andre Agassi (Germany) Florian Mayer (Luxembourg) Gilles Müller (South Korea) Lee Hyung-taik
30 Jan	Delray Beach International Tennis Championships; Delray Beach, USA; ATP International Series $380,000 – hard Singles – Doubles	(The Bahamas) Mark Knowles (Canada) Daniel Nestor; 6–2, 6–3	(South Africa) Chris Haggard (South Africa) Wesley Moodie	(Spain) Guillermo García López (United States) Vince Spadea	(United States) Andre Agassi (Germany) Florian Mayer (Luxembourg) Gilles Müller (South Korea) Lee Hyung-taik

=== February ===
Week	Tournament	Champions	Runners-up	Semifinalists	Quarterfinalists
6 Feb	Davis Cup first round Graz, Austria – clay Buenos Aires, Argentina – clay Minsk, Belarus – carpet (i); Geneva, Switzerland – clay Halle, Germany – hard Amsterdam, Netherlands – carpet (i); La Jolla, United States – hard Rancagua, Chile – clay	First round winners Croatia 3–2; Argentina 5–0; Belarus 4–1; Australia 3–2; France 3–2; Russia 5–0; United States 4–1; Chile 4–1	First round losers Austria; Sweden; Spain; Switzerland; Germany; Netherlands; Romania; Slovakia		
13 Feb	SAP Open; San Jose, USA; ATP International Series $380,000 – hard (i); Singles – Doubles	(United Kingdom) Andy Murray; 2–6, 6–1, 7–6^{(7–3)}	(Australia) Lleyton Hewitt	(United States) Andy Roddick (United States) Vince Spadea	(Germany) Björn Phau (Sweden) Robin Söderling (Australia) Wayne Arthurs (Belgium) Kristof Vliegen
13 Feb	SAP Open; San Jose, USA; ATP International Series $380,000 – hard (i); Singles – Doubles	(United States) John McEnroe (Sweden) Jonas Björkman; 7–6^{(7–2)}, 4–6, [10–7]	(United States) Paul Goldstein (United States) Jim Thomas	(United States) Andy Roddick (United States) Vince Spadea	(Germany) Björn Phau (Sweden) Robin Söderling (Australia) Wayne Arthurs (Belgium) Kristof Vliegen
13 Feb	Open 13; Marseille, France; ATP International Series $600,000 – hard (i); Singles – Doubles	(France) Arnaud Clément; 6–4, 6–2	(Croatia) Mario Ančić	(Spain) Rafael Nadal (France) Sébastien Grosjean	(France) Paul-Henri Mathieu (France) Fabrice Santoro (Russia) Evgeny Korolev (Croatia) Ivan Ljubičić
13 Feb	Open 13; Marseille, France; ATP International Series $600,000 – hard (i); Singles – Doubles	(Czech Republic) Martin Damm (Czech Republic) Radek Štěpánek; 6–2, 6–7^{(4–7)}, [10–3]	(The Bahamas) Mark Knowles (Canada) Daniel Nestor	(Spain) Rafael Nadal (France) Sébastien Grosjean	(France) Paul-Henri Mathieu (France) Fabrice Santoro (Russia) Evgeny Korolev (Croatia) Ivan Ljubičić
13 Feb	ATP Buenos Aires; Buenos Aires, Argentina; ATP International Series $425,000 – clay Singles – Doubles	(Spain) Carlos Moyá; 7–6^{(8–6)}, 6–4	(Italy) Filippo Volandri	(Argentina) Agustín Calleri (Spain) Juan Carlos Ferrero	(Serbia and Montenegro) Boris Pašanski (Argentina) José Acasuso (Italy) Potito Starace (Spain) Rubén Ramírez Hidalgo
13 Feb	ATP Buenos Aires; Buenos Aires, Argentina; ATP International Series $425,000 – clay Singles – Doubles	(Czech Republic) František Čermák (Czech Republic) Leoš Friedl; 6–1, 6–2	(Greece) Vasilis Mazarakis (Serbia and Montenegro) Boris Pašanski	(Argentina) Agustín Calleri (Spain) Juan Carlos Ferrero	(Serbia and Montenegro) Boris Pašanski (Argentina) José Acasuso (Italy) Potito Starace (Spain) Rubén Ramírez Hidalgo
20 Feb	Regions Morgan Keegan Championships; Memphis, USA; ATP International Series Gold $695,000 – hard (i); Singles – Doubles	(Germany) Tommy Haas; 6–3, 6–2	(Sweden) Robin Söderling	(France) Julien Benneteau (Belgium) Kristof Vliegen	(United States) Andy Roddick (Russia) Dmitry Tursunov (Chile) Paul Capdeville (United Kingdom) Andy Murray
20 Feb	Regions Morgan Keegan Championships; Memphis, USA; ATP International Series Gold $695,000 – hard (i); Singles – Doubles	(Croatia) Ivo Karlović (South Africa) Chris Haggard; 0–6, 7–5, [10–5]	(United States) James Blake (United States) Mardy Fish	(France) Julien Benneteau (Belgium) Kristof Vliegen	(United States) Andy Roddick (Russia) Dmitry Tursunov (Chile) Paul Capdeville (United Kingdom) Andy Murray
20 Feb	ABN AMRO World Tennis Tournament; Rotterdam, Netherlands; ATP International Series Gold $925,000 – hard (i); Singles – Doubles	(Czech Republic) Radek Štěpánek; 6–0, 6–3	(Belgium) Christophe Rochus	(Finland) Jarkko Nieminen (Russia) Nikolay Davydenko	(United Kingdom) Arvind Parmar (Belgium) Olivier Rochus (Serbia and Montenegro) Novak Djokovic (Italy) Daniele Bracciali
20 Feb	ABN AMRO World Tennis Tournament; Rotterdam, Netherlands; ATP International Series Gold $925,000 – hard (i); Singles – Doubles	(Australia) Paul Hanley (Zimbabwe) Kevin Ullyett; 7–6^{(7–4)}, 7–6^{(7–2)}	(Israel) Jonathan Erlich (Israel) Andy Ram	(Finland) Jarkko Nieminen (Russia) Nikolay Davydenko	(United Kingdom) Arvind Parmar (Belgium) Olivier Rochus (Serbia and Montenegro) Novak Djokovic (Italy) Daniele Bracciali
20 Feb	Brasil Open; Salvador, Brazil; ATP International Series $380,000 – clay Singles – Doubles	(Chile) Nicolás Massú; 6–3, 6–4	(Spain) Alberto Martín	(France) Olivier Patience (Argentina) Juan Mónaco	(Serbia and Montenegro) Boris Pašanski (Czech Republic) Jiri Vaněk (Argentina) Juan Ignacio Chela (Spain) Nicolás Almagro
20 Feb	Brasil Open; Salvador, Brazil; ATP International Series $380,000 – clay Singles – Doubles	(Czech Republic) Lukáš Dlouhý (Czech Republic) Pavel Vízner; 6–1, 4–6, [10–3]	(Poland) Mariusz Fyrstenberg (Poland) Marcin Matkowski	(France) Olivier Patience (Argentina) Juan Mónaco	(Serbia and Montenegro) Boris Pašanski (Czech Republic) Jiri Vaněk (Argentina) Juan Ignacio Chela (Spain) Nicolás Almagro
27 Feb	Dubai Tennis Championships; Dubai, United Arab Emirates; ATP International Series Gold $975,000 – hard Singles – Doubles	(Spain) Rafael Nadal; 2–6, 6–4, 6–4	(Switzerland) Roger Federer	(Russia) Mikhail Youzhny (Germany) Rainer Schüttler	(Czech Republic) Robin Vik (Belgium) Olivier Rochus (Germany) Björn Phau (United Kingdom) Tim Henman
27 Feb	Dubai Tennis Championships; Dubai, United Arab Emirates; ATP International Series Gold $975,000 – hard Singles – Doubles	(Australia) Paul Hanley (Zimbabwe) Kevin Ullyett; 1–6, 6–2, [10–1]	(The Bahamas) Mark Knowles (Canada) Daniel Nestor	(Russia) Mikhail Youzhny (Germany) Rainer Schüttler	(Czech Republic) Robin Vik (Belgium) Olivier Rochus (Germany) Björn Phau (United Kingdom) Tim Henman
27 Feb	Abierto Mexicano Telcel; Acapulco, Mexico; ATP International Series Gold $690,000 – clay Singles – Doubles	(Peru) Luis Horna; 7–6^{(7–5)}, 6–4	(Argentina) Juan Ignacio Chela	(Spain) Nicolás Almagro (Argentina) Gastón Gaudio	(Italy) Alessio di Mauro (Spain) Albert Montañés (Argentina) Agustín Calleri (Brazil) Marcos Daniel
27 Feb	Abierto Mexicano Telcel; Acapulco, Mexico; ATP International Series Gold $690,000 – clay Singles – Doubles	(Czech Republic) František Čermák (Czech Republic) Leoš Friedl; 7–5, 6–2	(Italy) Potito Starace (Italy) Filippo Volandri	(Spain) Nicolás Almagro (Argentina) Gastón Gaudio	(Italy) Alessio di Mauro (Spain) Albert Montañés (Argentina) Agustín Calleri (Brazil) Marcos Daniel
27 Feb	Tennis Channel Open; Las Vegas, USA; ATP International Series $380,000 – hard Singles – Doubles	(United States) James Blake; 7–5, 2–6, 6–3	(Australia) Lleyton Hewitt	(United States) Paul Goldstein (Croatia) Ivo Karlović	(Germany) Philipp Kohlschreiber (Belgium) Xavier Malisse (Spain) Tommy Robredo (Denmark) Kenneth Carlsen
27 Feb	Tennis Channel Open; Las Vegas, USA; ATP International Series $380,000 – hard Singles – Doubles	(United States) Bob Bryan (United States) Mike Bryan; 6–3, 6–2	(Czech Republic) Jaroslav Levinský (Sweden) Robert Lindstedt	(United States) Paul Goldstein (Croatia) Ivo Karlović	(Germany) Philipp Kohlschreiber (Belgium) Xavier Malisse (Spain) Tommy Robredo (Denmark) Kenneth Carlsen

=== March ===
Week	Tournament	Champions	Runners-up	Semifinalists	Quarterfinalists
6 Mar; 13 Mar	Pacific Life Open; Indian Wells, USA; ATP Masters Series $2,919,600 – hard Singles – Doubles	(Switzerland) Roger Federer; 7–5, 6–3, 6–0	(United States) James Blake	(Thailand) Paradorn Srichaphan (Spain) Rafael Nadal	(Croatia) Ivan Ljubičić (Finland) Jarkko Nieminen (Russia) Igor Andreev (Cyprus) Marcos Baghdatis
6 Mar; 13 Mar	Pacific Life Open; Indian Wells, USA; ATP Masters Series $2,919,600 – hard Singles – Doubles	(The Bahamas) Mark Knowles (Canada) Daniel Nestor; 6–4, 6–4	(United States) Bob Bryan (United States) Mike Bryan	(Thailand) Paradorn Srichaphan (Spain) Rafael Nadal	(Croatia) Ivan Ljubičić (Finland) Jarkko Nieminen (Russia) Igor Andreev (Cyprus) Marcos Baghdatis
20 Mar; 27 Mar	NASDAQ-100 Open; Key Biscayne, USA; ATP Masters Series $3,200,000 – hard Singles – Doubles	(Switzerland) Roger Federer; 7–6^{(7–5)}, 7–6^{(7–4)}, 7–6^{(8–6)}	(Croatia) Ivan Ljubičić	(Spain) David Ferrer (Argentina) David Nalbandian	(United States) James Blake (United States) Andy Roddick (Croatia) Mario Ančić (Argentina) Agustín Calleri
20 Mar; 27 Mar	NASDAQ-100 Open; Key Biscayne, USA; ATP Masters Series $3,200,000 – hard Singles – Doubles	(Sweden) Jonas Björkman (Belarus) Max Mirnyi; 6–4, 6–4	(United States) Bob Bryan (United States) Mike Bryan	(Spain) David Ferrer (Argentina) David Nalbandian	(United States) James Blake (United States) Andy Roddick (Croatia) Mario Ančić (Argentina) Agustín Calleri

=== April ===
Week	Tournament	Champions	Runners-up	Semifinalists	Quarterfinalists
3 Apr	Davis Cup Quarterfinals; Zagreb, Croatia – carpet (i); Melbourne, Australia – hard Pau, France – carpet (i); Rancho Mirage, USA – carpet	Quarterfinals winners Argentina 3–2; Australia 5–0; Russia 4–1; United States 3–2	Quarterfinals losers Croatia; Belarus; France; Chile		
10 Apr	Open de Tenis Comunidad Valenciana; Valencia, Spain; ATP International Series $400,000 – clay Singles – Doubles	(Spain) Nicolás Almagro; 6–2, 6–3	(France) Gilles Simon	(Spain) Fernando Verdasco (Russia) Marat Safin	(Spain) Guillermo García López (Italy) Andreas Seppi (Italy) Filippo Volandri (Argentina) Gastón Gaudio
10 Apr	Open de Tenis Comunidad Valenciana; Valencia, Spain; ATP International Series $400,000 – clay Singles – Doubles	(Czech Republic) David Škoch (Czech Republic) Tomáš Zíb; 6–4, 6–3	(Czech Republic) Lukáš Dlouhý (Czech Republic) Pavel Vízner	(Spain) Fernando Verdasco (Russia) Marat Safin	(Spain) Guillermo García López (Italy) Andreas Seppi (Italy) Filippo Volandri (Argentina) Gastón Gaudio
10 Apr	U.S. Men's Clay Court Championships; Houston, USA; ATP International Series $380,000 – clay Singles – Doubles	(United States) Mardy Fish; 3–6, 6–4, 6–3	(Austria) Jürgen Melzer	(Germany) Tommy Haas (United States) Paul Goldstein	(United States) Andy Roddick (United States) Vincent Spadea (Spain) Albert Montañés (Spain) Fernando Vicente
10 Apr	U.S. Men's Clay Court Championships; Houston, USA; ATP International Series $380,000 – clay Singles – Doubles	(Germany) Michael Kohlmann (Germany) Alexander Waske; 5–7, 6–4, [10–5]	(Austria) Julian Knowle (Austria) Jürgen Melzer	(Germany) Tommy Haas (United States) Paul Goldstein	(United States) Andy Roddick (United States) Vincent Spadea (Spain) Albert Montañés (Spain) Fernando Vicente
17 Apr	Monte Carlo Masters; Roquebrune-Cap-Martin, France; ATP Masters Series $2,270,000 – clay Singles – Doubles	(Spain) Rafael Nadal; 6–2, 6–7^{(2–7)}, 6–3, 7–6^{(7–5)}	(Switzerland) Roger Federer	(Chile) Fernando González (Argentina) Gastón Gaudio	(Spain) David Ferrer (Croatia) Ivan Ljubičić (Spain) Tommy Robredo (Argentina) Guillermo Coria
17 Apr	Monte Carlo Masters; Roquebrune-Cap-Martin, France; ATP Masters Series $2,270,000 – clay Singles – Doubles	(Sweden) Jonas Björkman (Belarus) Max Mirnyi; 6–2, 7–6^{(7–2)}	(France) Fabrice Santoro (Serbia and Montenegro) Nenad Zimonjić	(Chile) Fernando González (Argentina) Gastón Gaudio	(Spain) David Ferrer (Croatia) Ivan Ljubičić (Spain) Tommy Robredo (Argentina) Guillermo Coria
24 Apr	Grand Prix Hassan II; Casablanca, Morocco; ATP International Series $380,000 – clay Singles – Doubles	(Italy) Daniele Bracciali; 6–1, 6–4	(Chile) Nicolás Massú	(Germany) Björn Phau (France) Gilles Simon	(France) Nicolas Mahut (Czech Republic) Jiří Vaněk (Belgium) Christophe Rochus (Peru) Luis Horna
24 Apr	Grand Prix Hassan II; Casablanca, Morocco; ATP International Series $380,000 – clay Singles – Doubles	(Austria) Julian Knowle (Austria) Jürgen Melzer; 6–3, 6–4	(Germany) Michael Kohlmann (Germany) Alexander Waske	(Germany) Björn Phau (France) Gilles Simon	(France) Nicolas Mahut (Czech Republic) Jiří Vaněk (Belgium) Christophe Rochus (Peru) Luis Horna
24 Apr	Torneo Godó; Barcelona, Spain; ATP International Series Gold $1,000,000 – clay Singles – Doubles	(Spain) Rafael Nadal; 6–4, 6–4, 6–0	(Spain) Tommy Robredo	(Spain) Nicolás Almagro (Switzerland) Stanislas Wawrinka	(Finland) Jarkko Nieminen (Spain) Juan Carlos Ferrero (Czech Republic) Radek Štěpánek (Croatia) Ivo Karlović
24 Apr	Torneo Godó; Barcelona, Spain; ATP International Series Gold $1,000,000 – clay Singles – Doubles	(The Bahamas) Mark Knowles (Canada) Daniel Nestor; 6–2, 6–7^{(4–7)}, [10–5]	(Poland) Mariusz Fyrstenberg (Poland) Marcin Matkowski	(Spain) Nicolás Almagro (Switzerland) Stanislas Wawrinka	(Finland) Jarkko Nieminen (Spain) Juan Carlos Ferrero (Czech Republic) Radek Štěpánek (Croatia) Ivo Karlović

=== May ===
Week	Tournament	Champions	Runners-up	Semifinalists	Quarterfinalists
1 May	BMW Open; Munich, Germany; ATP International Series $380,000 – clay Singles – Doubles	(Belgium) Olivier Rochus; 6–4, 6–2	(Belgium) Kristof Vliegen	(Austria) Jürgen Melzer (Finland) Jarkko Nieminen	(Germany) Denis Gremelmayr (Croatia) Ivo Karlović (Czech Republic) Robin Vik (Germany) Philipp Kohlschreiber
1 May	BMW Open; Munich, Germany; ATP International Series $380,000 – clay Singles – Doubles	(Romania) Andrei Pavel (Germany) Alexander Waske; 6–4, 6–2	(Austria) Alexander Peya (Germany) Björn Phau	(Austria) Jürgen Melzer (Finland) Jarkko Nieminen	(Germany) Denis Gremelmayr (Croatia) Ivo Karlović (Czech Republic) Robin Vik (Germany) Philipp Kohlschreiber
1 May	Estoril Open; Oeiras, Portugal; ATP International Series $625,000 – clay Singles – Doubles	(Argentina) David Nalbandian; 6–3, 6–4	(Russia) Nikolay Davydenko	(Spain) Albert Portas (Spain) Carlos Moyá	(Portugal) Frederico Gil (United States) Justin Gimelstob (Spain) Guillermo García López (Luxembourg) Gilles Müller
1 May	Estoril Open; Oeiras, Portugal; ATP International Series $625,000 – clay Singles – Doubles	(Czech Republic) Lukáš Dlouhý (Czech Republic) Pavel Vízner; 6–3, 6–1	(Argentina) Lucas Arnold (Czech Republic) Leoš Friedl	(Spain) Albert Portas (Spain) Carlos Moyá	(Portugal) Frederico Gil (United States) Justin Gimelstob (Spain) Guillermo García López (Luxembourg) Gilles Müller
8 May	Internazionali BNL d'Italia; Rome, Italy; ATP Masters Series $2,200,000 – clay Singles – Doubles	(Spain) Rafael Nadal; 6–7^{(0–7)}, 7–6^{(7–5)}, 6–4, 2–6, 7–6^{(7–5)}	(Switzerland) Roger Federer	(Argentina) David Nalbandian (France) Gaël Monfils	(Spain) Nicolás Almagro (Croatia) Mario Ančić (United States) Andy Roddick (Chile) Fernando González
8 May	Internazionali BNL d'Italia; Rome, Italy; ATP Masters Series $2,200,000 – clay Singles – Doubles	(The Bahamas) Mark Knowles (Canada) Daniel Nestor; 6–4, 5–7, [13–11]	(Israel) Jonathan Erlich (Israel) Andy Ram	(Argentina) David Nalbandian (France) Gaël Monfils	(Spain) Nicolás Almagro (Croatia) Mario Ančić (United States) Andy Roddick (Chile) Fernando González
15 May	Hamburg Masters; Hamburg, Germany; ATP Masters Series $2,440,000 – clay Singles – Doubles	(Spain) Tommy Robredo; 6–1, 6–3, 6–3	(Czech Republic) Radek Štěpánek	(Croatia) Mario Ančić (Argentina) José Acasuso	(Spain) David Ferrer (Russia) Nikolay Davydenko (Spain) Fernando Verdasco (Belarus) Max Mirnyi
15 May	Hamburg Masters; Hamburg, Germany; ATP Masters Series $2,440,000 – clay Singles – Doubles	(Australia) Paul Hanley (Zimbabwe) Kevin Ullyett; 6–2, 7–6^{(10–8)}	(The Bahamas) Mark Knowles (Canada) Daniel Nestor	(Croatia) Mario Ančić (Argentina) José Acasuso	(Spain) David Ferrer (Russia) Nikolay Davydenko (Spain) Fernando Verdasco (Belarus) Max Mirnyi
22 May	Hypo Group Tennis International; Pörtschach, Austria; ATP International Series $380,000 – clay Singles – Doubles	(Russia) Nikolay Davydenko; 6–0, 6–3	(Romania) Andrei Pavel	(Czech Republic) Jiří Novák (Peru) Luis Horna	(Italy) Potito Starace (Austria) Jürgen Melzer (Argentina) Juan Mónaco (Austria) Oliver Marach
22 May	Hypo Group Tennis International; Pörtschach, Austria; ATP International Series $380,000 – clay Singles – Doubles	(Australia) Paul Hanley (United States) Jim Thomas; 6–3, 4–6, [10–5]	(Austria) Oliver Marach (Czech Republic) Cyril Suk	(Czech Republic) Jiří Novák (Peru) Luis Horna	(Italy) Potito Starace (Austria) Jürgen Melzer (Argentina) Juan Mónaco (Austria) Oliver Marach
22 May	World Team Cup; Düsseldorf, Germany; ATP World Team Championship €1,764,706 – clay – 8 teams (RR)	Croatia; 2–1	Germany	Round robin losers (Red Group) Chile; Spain; United States	Round robin losers (Blue Group) Czech Republic; Argentina; Italy
29 May; 5 Jun	French Open; Paris, France; Grand Slam $8,543,700 – clay Singles – Doubles – Mixed doubles	(Spain) Rafael Nadal; 1–6, 6–1, 6–4, 7–6^{(7–4)}	(Switzerland) Roger Federer	(Argentina) David Nalbandian (Croatia) Ivan Ljubičić	(Croatia) Mario Ančić (Russia) Nikolay Davydenko (France) Julien Benneteau (Serbia and Montenegro) Novak Djokovic
29 May; 5 Jun	French Open; Paris, France; Grand Slam $8,543,700 – clay Singles – Doubles – Mixed doubles	(Sweden) Jonas Björkman (Belarus) Max Mirnyi; 6–7^{(5–7)}, 6–4, 7–5	(United States) Bob Bryan (United States) Mike Bryan	(Argentina) David Nalbandian (Croatia) Ivan Ljubičić	(Croatia) Mario Ančić (Russia) Nikolay Davydenko (France) Julien Benneteau (Serbia and Montenegro) Novak Djokovic
29 May; 5 Jun	French Open; Paris, France; Grand Slam $8,543,700 – clay Singles – Doubles – Mixed doubles	(Slovenia) Katarina Srebotnik (Serbia and Montenegro) Nenad Zimonjić; 6–3, 6–4	(Russia) Elena Likhovtseva (Canada) Daniel Nestor	(Argentina) David Nalbandian (Croatia) Ivan Ljubičić	(Croatia) Mario Ančić (Russia) Nikolay Davydenko (France) Julien Benneteau (Serbia and Montenegro) Novak Djokovic

=== June ===
Week	Tournament	Champions	Runners-up	Semifinalists	Quarterfinalists
12 Jun	Queen's Club Championships; Queen's Club, United Kingdom; ATP International Series $800,000 – grass Singles – Doubles	(Australia) Lleyton Hewitt; 6–4, 6–4	(United States) James Blake	(United Kingdom) Tim Henman (United States) Andy Roddick	(Spain) Rafael Nadal (Russia) Dmitry Tursunov (Chile) Fernando González (France) Gaël Monfils
12 Jun	Queen's Club Championships; Queen's Club, United Kingdom; ATP International Series $800,000 – grass Singles – Doubles	(Australia) Paul Hanley (Zimbabwe) Kevin Ullyett; 6–4, 3–6, [10–8]	(Sweden) Jonas Björkman (Belarus) Max Mirnyi	(United Kingdom) Tim Henman (United States) Andy Roddick	(Spain) Rafael Nadal (Russia) Dmitry Tursunov (Chile) Fernando González (France) Gaël Monfils
12 Jun	Gerry Weber Open; Halle, Germany; ATP International Series $800,000 – grass Single draws – Doubles	(Switzerland) Roger Federer; 6–0, 6–7^{(4–7)}, 6–2	(Czech Republic) Tomáš Berdych	(Germany) Tommy Haas (Belgium) Kristof Vliegen	(Belgium) Olivier Rochus (Sweden) Robin Söderling (Germany) Florian Mayer (France) Fabrice Santoro
12 Jun	Gerry Weber Open; Halle, Germany; ATP International Series $800,000 – grass Single draws – Doubles	(France) Fabrice Santoro (Serbia) Nenad Zimonjić; 6–0, 6–4	(Germany) Michael Kohlmann (Germany) Rainer Schüttler	(Germany) Tommy Haas (Belgium) Kristof Vliegen	(Belgium) Olivier Rochus (Sweden) Robin Söderling (Germany) Florian Mayer (France) Fabrice Santoro
19 Jun	Ordina Open 's-Hertogenbosch, Netherlands; ATP International Series $380,000 – grass Singles – Doubles	(Croatia) Mario Ančić; 6–0, 5–7, 7–5	(Czech Republic) Jan Hernych	(Cyprus) Marcos Baghdatis (France) Florent Serra	(Germany) Philipp Kohlschreiber (France) Fabrice Santoro (South Korea) Lee Hyung-taik (Spain) Juan Carlos Ferrero
19 Jun	Ordina Open 's-Hertogenbosch, Netherlands; ATP International Series $380,000 – grass Singles – Doubles	(Czech Republic) Martin Damm (India) Leander Paes; 6–1, 7–6^{(7–3)}	(France) Arnaud Clément (South Africa) Chris Haggard	(Cyprus) Marcos Baghdatis (France) Florent Serra	(Germany) Philipp Kohlschreiber (France) Fabrice Santoro (South Korea) Lee Hyung-taik (Spain) Juan Carlos Ferrero
19 Jun	Nottingham Open; Nottingham, United Kingdom; ATP International Series $380,000 – grass Singles – Doubles	(France) Richard Gasquet; 6–4, 6–3	(Sweden) Jonas Björkman	(Sweden) Robin Söderling (Italy) Andreas Seppi	(France) Gilles Simon (Serbia) Janko Tipsarević (Spain) Feliciano López (United Kingdom) Andy Murray
19 Jun	Nottingham Open; Nottingham, United Kingdom; ATP International Series $380,000 – grass Singles – Doubles	(Israel) Jonathan Erlich (Israel) Andy Ram; 6–3, 6–2	(Russia) Igor Kunitsyn (Russia) Dmitry Tursunov	(Sweden) Robin Söderling (Italy) Andreas Seppi	(France) Gilles Simon (Serbia) Janko Tipsarević (Spain) Feliciano López (United Kingdom) Andy Murray
26 Jun; 3 Jul	Wimbledon Championships; London, United Kingdom; Grand Slam $8,847,338 – grass Singles – Doubles – Mixed doubles	(Switzerland) Roger Federer; 6–0, 7–6^{(7–5)}, 6–7^{(2–7)}, 6–3	(Spain) Rafael Nadal	(Sweden) Jonas Björkman (Cyprus) Marcos Baghdatis	(Croatia) Mario Ančić (Czech Republic) Radek Štěpánek (Australia) Lleyton Hewitt (Finland) Jarkko Nieminen
26 Jun; 3 Jul	Wimbledon Championships; London, United Kingdom; Grand Slam $8,847,338 – grass Singles – Doubles – Mixed doubles	(United States) Bob Bryan (United States) Mike Bryan; 6–3, 4–6, 6–4, 6–2	(France) Fabrice Santoro (Serbia) Nenad Zimonjić	(Sweden) Jonas Björkman (Cyprus) Marcos Baghdatis	(Croatia) Mario Ančić (Czech Republic) Radek Štěpánek (Australia) Lleyton Hewitt (Finland) Jarkko Nieminen
26 Jun; 3 Jul	Wimbledon Championships; London, United Kingdom; Grand Slam $8,847,338 – grass Singles – Doubles – Mixed doubles	(Israel) Andy Ram (Russia) Vera Zvonareva; 6–3, 6–2	(United States) Bob Bryan (United States) Venus Williams	(Sweden) Jonas Björkman (Cyprus) Marcos Baghdatis	(Croatia) Mario Ančić (Czech Republic) Radek Štěpánek (Australia) Lleyton Hewitt (Finland) Jarkko Nieminen

=== July ===
Week	Tournament	Champions	Runners-up	Semifinalists	Quarterfinalists
10 Jul	Allianz Suisse Open Gstaad; Gstaad, Switzerland; ATP International Series $495,000 – clay Singles – Doubles	(France) Richard Gasquet; 7–6^{(7–4)}, 6–7^{(3–7)}, 6–3, 6–3	(Spain) Feliciano López	(Croatia) Marin Čilić (Germany) Philipp Kohlschreiber	(Croatia) Ivan Ljubičić (Romania) Andrei Pavel (Spain) Fernando Verdasco (Argentina) Gastón Gaudio
10 Jul	Allianz Suisse Open Gstaad; Gstaad, Switzerland; ATP International Series $495,000 – clay Singles – Doubles	(Czech Republic) Jiří Novák (Romania) Andrei Pavel; 6–3, 6–1	(Switzerland) Marco Chiudinelli (Switzerland) Jean-Claude Scherrer	(Croatia) Marin Čilić (Germany) Philipp Kohlschreiber	(Croatia) Ivan Ljubičić (Romania) Andrei Pavel (Spain) Fernando Verdasco (Argentina) Gastón Gaudio
10 Jul	Campbell's Hall of Fame Tennis Championships; Newport, USA; ATP International Series $380,000 – grass Singles – Doubles	(Australia) Mark Philippoussis; 6–3, 7–5	(United States) Justin Gimelstob	(United Kingdom) Andy Murray (Austria) Jürgen Melzer	(United States) Robert Kendrick (Denmark) Kristian Pless (United States) Mardy Fish (United Kingdom) Alex Bogdanovic
10 Jul	Campbell's Hall of Fame Tennis Championships; Newport, USA; ATP International Series $380,000 – grass Singles – Doubles	(Austria) Jürgen Melzer (United States) Robert Kendrick; 7–6^{(7–3)}, 6–0	(South Africa) Jeff Coetzee (United States) Justin Gimelstob	(United Kingdom) Andy Murray (Austria) Jürgen Melzer	(United States) Robert Kendrick (Denmark) Kristian Pless (United States) Mardy Fish (United Kingdom) Alex Bogdanovic
10 Jul	Swedish Open; Båstad, Sweden; ATP International Series $380,000 – clay Singles – Doubles	(Spain) Tommy Robredo; 6–2, 6–1	(Russia) Nikolay Davydenko	(Argentina) Agustín Calleri (Finland) Jarkko Nieminen	(Chile) Nicolás Massú (Sweden) Robin Söderling (Spain) Juan Carlos Ferrero (Russia) Evgeny Korolev
10 Jul	Swedish Open; Båstad, Sweden; ATP International Series $380,000 – clay Singles – Doubles	(Sweden) Jonas Björkman (Sweden) Thomas Johansson; 6–3, 4–6, [10–4]	(Germany) Christopher Kas (Austria) Oliver Marach	(Argentina) Agustín Calleri (Finland) Jarkko Nieminen	(Chile) Nicolás Massú (Sweden) Robin Söderling (Spain) Juan Carlos Ferrero (Russia) Evgeny Korolev
17 Jul	RCA Championships; Indianapolis, USA; ATP International Series $600,000 – hard Singles – Doubles	(United States) James Blake; 4–6, 6–4, 7–6^{(7–5)}	(United States) Andy Roddick	(Belgium) Xavier Malisse (United States) Robby Ginepri	(France) Nicolas Mahut (Chile) Fernando González (Thailand) Paradorn Srichaphan (Luxembourg) Gilles Müller
17 Jul	RCA Championships; Indianapolis, USA; ATP International Series $600,000 – hard Singles – Doubles	(United States) Bobby Reynolds (United States) Andy Roddick; 6–4, 6–4	(United States) Paul Goldstein (United States) Jim Thomas	(Belgium) Xavier Malisse (United States) Robby Ginepri	(France) Nicolas Mahut (Chile) Fernando González (Thailand) Paradorn Srichaphan (Luxembourg) Gilles Müller
17 Jul	Dutch Open; Amersfoort, Netherlands; ATP International Series $380,000 – clay Singles – Doubles	(Serbia) Novak Djokovic; 7–6^{(7–5)}, 6–4	(Chile) Nicolás Massú	(Argentina) Guillermo Coria (Spain) Rubén Ramírez Hidalgo	(Argentina) Agustín Calleri (France) Marc Gicquel (Spain) Carlos Moyá (Spain) Alberto Martín
17 Jul	Dutch Open; Amersfoort, Netherlands; ATP International Series $380,000 – clay Singles – Doubles	(Spain) Alberto Martín (Spain) Fernando Vicente; 6–4, 6–3	(Argentina) Lucas Arnold (Germany) Christopher Kas	(Argentina) Guillermo Coria (Spain) Rubén Ramírez Hidalgo	(Argentina) Agustín Calleri (France) Marc Gicquel (Spain) Carlos Moyá (Spain) Alberto Martín
17 Jul	Mercedes Cup; Stuttgart, Germany; ATP International Series Gold $690,000 – clay Singles – Doubles	(Spain) David Ferrer; 6–4, 3–6, 6–7^{(3–7)}, 7–5, 6–4	(Argentina) José Acasuso	(Argentina) Juan Mónaco (Czech Republic) Tomáš Berdych	(Peru) Luis Horna (Austria) Oliver Marach (Germany) Florian Mayer (Ecuador) Nicolás Lapentti
17 Jul	Mercedes Cup; Stuttgart, Germany; ATP International Series Gold $690,000 – clay Singles – Doubles	(Argentina) Gastón Gaudio (Belarus) Max Mirnyi; 7–5, 6–7^{(4–7)}, [12–10]	(Switzerland) Yves Allegro (Sweden) Robert Lindstedt	(Argentina) Juan Mónaco (Czech Republic) Tomáš Berdych	(Peru) Luis Horna (Austria) Oliver Marach (Germany) Florian Mayer (Ecuador) Nicolás Lapentti
24 Jul	Countrywide Classic; Los Angeles, USA; ATP International Series $500,000 – hard Singles – Doubles	(Germany) Tommy Haas; 4–6, 7–5, 6–3	(Russia) Dmitry Tursunov	(Chile) Fernando González (Slovakia) Dominik Hrbatý	(United States) Andy Roddick (United States) Andre Agassi (United States) Robby Ginepri (United States) Paul Goldstein
24 Jul	Countrywide Classic; Los Angeles, USA; ATP International Series $500,000 – hard Singles – Doubles	(United States) Bob Bryan (United States) Mike Bryan; 6–2, 6–4	(United States) Eric Butorac (United Kingdom) Jamie Murray	(Chile) Fernando González (Slovakia) Dominik Hrbatý	(United States) Andy Roddick (United States) Andre Agassi (United States) Robby Ginepri (United States) Paul Goldstein
24 Jul	Croatia Open Umag; Umag, Croatia; ATP International Series $400,000 – clay Singles – Doubles	(Switzerland) Stanislas Wawrinka; 6–6^{(1–3)} RET	(Serbia) Novak Djokovic	(Spain) Carlos Moyá (Italy) Filippo Volandri	(Argentina) Juan Pablo Guzmán (Czech Republic) Jiří Vaněk (Argentina) Juan Martín del Potro (Spain) Albert Portas
24 Jul	Croatia Open Umag; Umag, Croatia; ATP International Series $400,000 – clay Singles – Doubles	(Czech Republic) Jaroslav Levinský (Czech Republic) David Škoch; 6–4, 6–4	(Spain) Guillermo García López (Spain) Albert Portas	(Spain) Carlos Moyá (Italy) Filippo Volandri	(Argentina) Juan Pablo Guzmán (Czech Republic) Jiří Vaněk (Argentina) Juan Martín del Potro (Spain) Albert Portas
24 Jul	Interwetten Austrian Open Kitzbühel; Kitzbühel, Austria; ATP International Series Gold $760,000 – clay Singles – Doubles	(Argentina) Agustín Calleri; 7–6^{(11–9)}, 6–2, 6–3	(Argentina) Juan Ignacio Chela	(Spain) Fernando Verdasco (Russia) Mikhail Youzhny	(Ecuador) Nicolás Lapentti (Argentina) Gastón Gaudio (Germany) Philipp Kohlschreiber (Austria) Jürgen Melzer
24 Jul	Interwetten Austrian Open Kitzbühel; Kitzbühel, Austria; ATP International Series Gold $760,000 – clay Singles – Doubles	(Germany) Philipp Kohlschreiber (Austria) Stefan Koubek; 6–2, 6–3	(Austria) Oliver Marach (Czech Republic) Cyril Suk	(Spain) Fernando Verdasco (Russia) Mikhail Youzhny	(Ecuador) Nicolás Lapentti (Argentina) Gastón Gaudio (Germany) Philipp Kohlschreiber (Austria) Jürgen Melzer
31 Jul	Orange Warsaw Open; Sopot, Poland; ATP International Series $500,000 – clay Singles – Doubles	(Russia) Nikolay Davydenko; 7–6^{(8–6)}, 5–7, 6–4	(Germany) Florian Mayer	(Italy) Filippo Volandri (Argentina) Agustín Calleri	(Argentina) Carlos Berlocq (Austria) Oliver Marach (Poland) Michał Przysiężny (Argentina) Juan Ignacio Chela
31 Jul	Orange Warsaw Open; Sopot, Poland; ATP International Series $500,000 – clay Singles – Doubles	(Czech Republic) František Čermák (Czech Republic) Leoš Friedl; 6–3, 7–5	(Argentina) Martin García (Argentina) Sebastián Prieto	(Italy) Filippo Volandri (Argentina) Agustín Calleri	(Argentina) Carlos Berlocq (Austria) Oliver Marach (Poland) Michał Przysiężny (Argentina) Juan Ignacio Chela
31 Jul	Legg Mason Tennis Classic; Washington, D.C., USA; ATP International Series $600,000 – hard Singles – Doubles	(France) Arnaud Clément; 7–6^{(7–3)}, 6–2	(United Kingdom) Andy Murray	(Russia) Marat Safin (Russia) Dmitry Tursunov	(South Africa) Wesley Moodie (Australia) Lleyton Hewitt (United States) Mardy Fish (United Kingdom) Tim Henman
31 Jul	Legg Mason Tennis Classic; Washington, D.C., USA; ATP International Series $600,000 – hard Singles – Doubles	(United States) Bob Bryan (United States) Mike Bryan; 6–3, 5–7, [10–3]	(Australia) Paul Hanley (Zimbabwe) Kevin Ullyett	(Russia) Marat Safin (Russia) Dmitry Tursunov	(South Africa) Wesley Moodie (Australia) Lleyton Hewitt (United States) Mardy Fish (United Kingdom) Tim Henman

=== August ===
Week	Tournament	Champions	Runners-up	Semifinalists	Quarterfinalists
7 Aug	Rogers Cup; Toronto, Canada; ATP Masters Series $2,200,000 – hard Singles – Doubles	(Switzerland) Roger Federer; 2–6, 6–3, 6–2	(France) Richard Gasquet	(Chile) Fernando González (United Kingdom) Andy Murray	(Belgium) Xavier Malisse (Argentina) José Acasuso (Finland) Jarkko Nieminen (Czech Republic) Tomáš Berdych
7 Aug	Rogers Cup; Toronto, Canada; ATP Masters Series $2,200,000 – hard Singles – Doubles	(United States) Bob Bryan (United States) Mike Bryan; 6–3, 7–5	(Australia) Paul Hanley (Zimbabwe) Kevin Ullyett	(Chile) Fernando González (United Kingdom) Andy Murray	(Belgium) Xavier Malisse (Argentina) José Acasuso (Finland) Jarkko Nieminen (Czech Republic) Tomáš Berdych
14 Aug	Western & Southern Financial Group Masters; Mason, USA; ATP Masters Series $2,200,000 – hard Singles – Doubles	(United States) Andy Roddick; 6–3, 6–4	(Spain) Juan Carlos Ferrero	(Chile) Fernando González (Spain) Tommy Robredo	(United Kingdom) Andy Murray (Spain) David Ferrer (Croatia) Ivan Ljubičić (Spain) Rafael Nadal
14 Aug	Western & Southern Financial Group Masters; Mason, USA; ATP Masters Series $2,200,000 – hard Singles – Doubles	(Sweden) Jonas Björkman (Belarus) Max Mirnyi; 3–6, 6–3, [10–7]	(United States) Bob Bryan (United States) Mike Bryan	(Chile) Fernando González (Spain) Tommy Robredo	(United Kingdom) Andy Murray (Spain) David Ferrer (Croatia) Ivan Ljubičić (Spain) Rafael Nadal
21 Aug	Pilot Pen Tennis; New Haven, USA; ATP International Series $675,000 – hard Singles – Doubles	(Russia) Nikolay Davydenko; 6–4, 6–3	(Argentina) Agustín Calleri	(Belgium) Xavier Malisse (Sweden) Robin Söderling	(Argentina) Juan Ignacio Chela (Chile) Nicolás Massú (Austria) Jürgen Melzer (Belgium) Olivier Rochus
21 Aug	Pilot Pen Tennis; New Haven, USA; ATP International Series $675,000 – hard Singles – Doubles	(Israel) Jonathan Erlich (Israel) Andy Ram; 6–3, 6–3	(Poland) Mariusz Fyrstenberg (Poland) Marcin Matkowski	(Belgium) Xavier Malisse (Sweden) Robin Söderling	(Argentina) Juan Ignacio Chela (Chile) Nicolás Massú (Austria) Jürgen Melzer (Belgium) Olivier Rochus
28 Aug; 4 Sep	US Open; New York City, USA; Grand Slam $8,332,000 – hard Singles – Doubles – Mixed doubles	(Switzerland) Roger Federer; 6–2, 4–6, 7–5, 6–1	(United States) Andy Roddick	(Russia) Nikolay Davydenko (Russia) Mikhail Youzhny	(United States) James Blake (Germany) Tommy Haas (Australia) Lleyton Hewitt (Spain) Rafael Nadal
28 Aug; 4 Sep	US Open; New York City, USA; Grand Slam $8,332,000 – hard Singles – Doubles – Mixed doubles	(Czech Republic) Martin Damm (India) Leander Paes; 6–7^{(5–7)}, 6–4, 6–3	(Sweden) Jonas Björkman (Belarus) Max Mirnyi	(Russia) Nikolay Davydenko (Russia) Mikhail Youzhny	(United States) James Blake (Germany) Tommy Haas (Australia) Lleyton Hewitt (Spain) Rafael Nadal
28 Aug; 4 Sep	US Open; New York City, USA; Grand Slam $8,332,000 – hard Singles – Doubles – Mixed doubles	(United States) Bob Bryan (United States) Martina Navratilova; 6–2, 6–3	(Czech Republic) Martin Damm (Czech Republic) Květa Peschke	(Russia) Nikolay Davydenko (Russia) Mikhail Youzhny	(United States) James Blake (Germany) Tommy Haas (Australia) Lleyton Hewitt (Spain) Rafael Nadal

=== September ===
Week	Tournament	Champions	Runners-up	Semifinalists	Quarterfinalists
11 Sep	China Open; Beijing, China; ATP International Series $500,000 – hard Singles – Doubles	(Cyprus) Marcos Baghdatis; 6–4, 6–0	(Croatia) Mario Ančić	(South Korea) Lee Hyung-taik (Thailand) Paradorn Srichaphan	(Croatia) Ivan Ljubičić (Slovakia) Dominik Hrbatý (Thailand) Danai Udomchoke (Russia) Nikolay Davydenko
11 Sep	China Open; Beijing, China; ATP International Series $500,000 – hard Singles – Doubles	(India) Mahesh Bhupathi (Croatia) Mario Ančić; 6–4, 6–3	(Germany) Michael Berrer (Denmark) Kenneth Carlsen	(South Korea) Lee Hyung-taik (Thailand) Paradorn Srichaphan	(Croatia) Ivan Ljubičić (Slovakia) Dominik Hrbatý (Thailand) Danai Udomchoke (Russia) Nikolay Davydenko
11 Sep	BCR Open Romania; Bucharest, Romania; ATP International Series $380,000 – clay Singles – Doubles	(Austria) Jürgen Melzer; 6–1, 7–5	(Italy) Filippo Volandri	(France) Paul-Henri Mathieu (France) Florent Serra	(Spain) Guillermo García López (Spain) Rubén Ramírez Hidalgo (Spain) Carlos Moyá (Germany) Florian Mayer
11 Sep	BCR Open Romania; Bucharest, Romania; ATP International Series $380,000 – clay Singles – Doubles	(Poland) Mariusz Fyrstenberg (Poland) Marcin Matkowski; 6–7^{(5–7)}, 7–6^{(7–5)}, [10–8]	(Argentina) Martín García (Peru) Luis Horna	(France) Paul-Henri Mathieu (France) Florent Serra	(Spain) Guillermo García López (Spain) Rubén Ramírez Hidalgo (Spain) Carlos Moyá (Germany) Florian Mayer
18 Sep	Davis Cup Semifinals; Buenos Aires, Argentina – clay (i); Moscow, Russia – clay	Semifinals winners Argentina 5–0; Russia 3–2	Semifinals losers Australia; United States		
25 Sep	PTT Thailand Open; Bangkok, Thailand; ATP International Series $550,000 – hard (i); Singles – Doubles	(United States) James Blake; 6–3, 6–1	(Croatia) Ivan Ljubičić	(Thailand) Paradorn Srichaphan (Russia) Marat Safin	(United States) Robby Ginepri (United Kingdom) Tim Henman (Finland) Jarkko Nieminen (Germany) Mischa Zverev
25 Sep	PTT Thailand Open; Bangkok, Thailand; ATP International Series $550,000 – hard (i); Singles – Doubles	(Israel) Jonathan Erlich (Israel) Andy Ram; 6–2, 2–6, [10–4]	(United Kingdom) Andy Murray (United Kingdom) Jamie Murray	(Thailand) Paradorn Srichaphan (Russia) Marat Safin	(United States) Robby Ginepri (United Kingdom) Tim Henman (Finland) Jarkko Nieminen (Germany) Mischa Zverev
25 Sep	Kingfisher Airlines Tennis Open; Mumbai, India; ATP International Series $380,000 – hard Singles – Doubles	(Russia) Dmitry Tursunov; 6–3, 4–6, 7–6^{(7–5)}	(Czech Republic) Tomáš Berdych	(Spain) Tommy Robredo (Austria) Stefan Koubek	(Paraguay) Ramón Delgado (United Kingdom) James Auckland (Germany) Björn Phau (Croatia) Mario Ančić
25 Sep	Kingfisher Airlines Tennis Open; Mumbai, India; ATP International Series $380,000 – hard Singles – Doubles	(Croatia) Mario Ančić (India) Mahesh Bhupathi; 6–4, 6–7^{(6–8)}, [10–8]	(India) Rohan Bopanna (India) Mustafa Ghouse	(Spain) Tommy Robredo (Austria) Stefan Koubek	(Paraguay) Ramón Delgado (United Kingdom) James Auckland (Germany) Björn Phau (Croatia) Mario Ančić
25 Sep	Campionati Internazionali di Sicilia; Palermo, Italy; ATP International Series $380,000 – clay Singles – Doubles	(Italy) Filippo Volandri; 5–7, 6–1, 6–3	(Ecuador) Nicolás Lapentti	(Spain) Rubén Ramírez Hidalgo (Spain) Nicolás Almagro	(Spain) Fernando Verdasco (France) Gilles Simon (Argentina) Martín Vassallo Argüello (Spain) Albert Montañés
25 Sep	Campionati Internazionali di Sicilia; Palermo, Italy; ATP International Series $380,000 – clay Singles – Doubles	(Argentina) Martín García (Peru) Luis Horna; 7–6^{(7–1)}, 7–6^{(7–2)}	(Poland) Mariusz Fyrstenberg (Poland) Marcin Matkowski	(Spain) Rubén Ramírez Hidalgo (Spain) Nicolás Almagro	(Spain) Fernando Verdasco (France) Gilles Simon (Argentina) Martín Vassallo Argüello (Spain) Albert Montañés

=== October ===
Week	Tournament	Champions	Runners-up	Semifinalists	Quarterfinalists
2 Oct	Open de Moselle; Metz, France; ATP International Series $500,000 – hard (i); Singles – Doubles	(Serbia) Novak Djokovic; 4–6, 6–3, 6–2	(Austria) Jürgen Melzer	(France) Marc Gicquel (France) Sébastien Grosjean	(France) Florent Serra (United States) Mardy Fish (Germany) Tobias Clemens (France) Arnaud Clément
2 Oct	Open de Moselle; Metz, France; ATP International Series $500,000 – hard (i); Singles – Doubles	(France) Richard Gasquet (France) Fabrice Santoro; 3–6, 6–1, [11–9]	(Austria) Julian Knowle (Austria) Jürgen Melzer	(France) Marc Gicquel (France) Sébastien Grosjean	(France) Florent Serra (United States) Mardy Fish (Germany) Tobias Clemens (France) Arnaud Clément
2 Oct	Japan Open Tennis Championships; Tokyo, Japan; ATP International Series Gold $765,000 – hard Singles – Doubles	(Switzerland) Roger Federer; 6–3, 6–3	(United Kingdom) Tim Henman	(Germany) Benjamin Becker (South Korea) Hyung-taik Lee	(Japan) Takao Suzuki (Finland) Jarkko Nieminen (Croatia) Mario Ančić (Spain) Tommy Robredo
2 Oct	Japan Open Tennis Championships; Tokyo, Japan; ATP International Series Gold $765,000 – hard Singles – Doubles	(Australia) Ashley Fisher (United States) Tripp Phillips; 6–2, 7–5	(United States) Paul Goldstein (United States) Jim Thomas	(Germany) Benjamin Becker (South Korea) Hyung-taik Lee	(Japan) Takao Suzuki (Finland) Jarkko Nieminen (Croatia) Mario Ančić (Spain) Tommy Robredo
9 Oct	If Stockholm Open; Stockholm, Sweden; ATP International Series $800,000 – hard (i); Singles – Doubles	(United States) James Blake; 6–4, 6–2	(Finland) Jarkko Nieminen	(Sweden) Joachim Johansson (Sweden) Robin Söderling	(Belgium) Kristof Vliegen (Spain) Feliciano López (Czech Republic) Tomáš Berdych (Belgium) Olivier Rochus
9 Oct	If Stockholm Open; Stockholm, Sweden; ATP International Series $800,000 – hard (i); Singles – Doubles	(Australia) Paul Hanley (Zimbabwe) Kevin Ullyett; 7–6^{(7–2)}, 6–4	(Belgium) Olivier Rochus (Belgium) Kristof Vliegen	(Sweden) Joachim Johansson (Sweden) Robin Söderling	(Belgium) Kristof Vliegen (Spain) Feliciano López (Czech Republic) Tomáš Berdych (Belgium) Olivier Rochus
9 Oct	BA-CA-TennisTrophy; Vienna, Austria; ATP International Series Gold $690,000 – hard (i); Singles – Doubles	(Croatia) Ivan Ljubičić; 6–3, 6–4, 7–5	(Chile) Fernando González	(Slovakia) Dominik Hrbatý (United States) Andy Roddick	(Switzerland) Stanislas Wawrinka (Austria) Stefan Koubek (Austria) Jürgen Melzer (Argentina) David Nalbandian
9 Oct	BA-CA-TennisTrophy; Vienna, Austria; ATP International Series Gold $690,000 – hard (i); Singles – Doubles	(Czech Republic) Petr Pála (Czech Republic) Pavel Vízner; 6–4, 3–6, [12–10]	(Austria) Julian Knowle (Austria) Jürgen Melzer	(Slovakia) Dominik Hrbatý (United States) Andy Roddick	(Switzerland) Stanislas Wawrinka (Austria) Stefan Koubek (Austria) Jürgen Melzer (Argentina) David Nalbandian
9 Oct	Kremlin Cup; Moscow, Russia; ATP International Series $1,000,000 – carpet (i); Singles – Doubles	(Russia) Nikolay Davydenko; 6–4, 5–7, 6–4	(Russia) Marat Safin	(France) Fabrice Santoro (Russia) Igor Kunitsyn	(Belarus) Max Mirnyi (Germany) Philipp Kohlschreiber (Serbia) Janko Tipsarević (France) Arnaud Clément
9 Oct	Kremlin Cup; Moscow, Russia; ATP International Series $1,000,000 – carpet (i); Singles – Doubles	(France) Fabrice Santoro (Serbia) Nenad Zimonjić; 6–1, 7–5	(Czech Republic) František Čermák (Czech Republic) Jaroslav Levinský	(France) Fabrice Santoro (Russia) Igor Kunitsyn	(Belarus) Max Mirnyi (Germany) Philipp Kohlschreiber (Serbia) Janko Tipsarević (France) Arnaud Clément
16 Oct	Mutua Madrileña Madrid Masters; Madrid, Spain; ATP Masters Series $2,200,000 – hard (i); Singles – Doubles	(Switzerland) Roger Federer; 7–5, 6–1, 6–0	(Chile) Fernando González	(Argentina) David Nalbandian (Czech Republic) Tomáš Berdych	(United States) Robby Ginepri (Russia) Marat Safin (Serbia) Novak Djokovic (Spain) Rafael Nadal
16 Oct	Mutua Madrileña Madrid Masters; Madrid, Spain; ATP Masters Series $2,200,000 – hard (i); Singles – Doubles	(United States) Bob Bryan (United States) Mike Bryan; 7–5, 6–4	(The Bahamas) Mark Knowles (Canada) Daniel Nestor	(Argentina) David Nalbandian (Czech Republic) Tomáš Berdych	(United States) Robby Ginepri (Russia) Marat Safin (Serbia) Novak Djokovic (Spain) Rafael Nadal
23 Oct	St. Petersburg Open; Saint Petersburg, Russia; ATP International Series $1,000,000 – carpet (i); Singles – Doubles	(Croatia) Mario Ančić; 7–5, 7–6^{(7–2)}	(Sweden) Thomas Johansson	(Russia) Igor Kunitsyn (Latvia) Ernests Gulbis	(South Africa) Wesley Moodie (Italy) Potito Starace (Belarus) Max Mirnyi (Czech Republic) Jan Hernych
23 Oct	St. Petersburg Open; Saint Petersburg, Russia; ATP International Series $1,000,000 – carpet (i); Singles – Doubles	(Sweden) Simon Aspelin (Australia) Todd Perry; 6–1, 7–6^{(7–3)}	(Austria) Julian Knowle (Austria) Jürgen Melzer	(Russia) Igor Kunitsyn (Latvia) Ernests Gulbis	(South Africa) Wesley Moodie (Italy) Potito Starace (Belarus) Max Mirnyi (Czech Republic) Jan Hernych
23 Oct	Grand Prix de Tennis de Lyon; Lyon, France; ATP International Series $800,000 – carpet (i); Singles – Doubles	(France) Richard Gasquet; 6–3, 6–1	(France) Marc Gicquel	(France) Arnaud Clément (Belgium) Xavier Malisse	(Spain) Nicolás Almagro (Sweden) Robin Söderling (France) Sébastien Grosjean (United States) Robby Ginepri
23 Oct	Grand Prix de Tennis de Lyon; Lyon, France; ATP International Series $800,000 – carpet (i); Singles – Doubles	(France) Julien Benneteau (France) Arnaud Clément; 6–2, 6–7^{(3–7)}, [10–7]	(Czech Republic) František Čermák (Czech Republic) Jaroslav Levinský	(France) Arnaud Clément (Belgium) Xavier Malisse	(Spain) Nicolás Almagro (Sweden) Robin Söderling (France) Sébastien Grosjean (United States) Robby Ginepri
23 Oct	Davidoff Swiss Indoors; Basel, Switzerland; ATP International Series $1,000,000 – carpet (i); Singles – Doubles	(Switzerland) Roger Federer; 6–3, 6–2, 7–6^{(7–3)}	(Chile) Fernando González	(Thailand) Paradorn Srichaphan (Switzerland) Stanislas Wawrinka	(Spain) David Ferrer (Argentina) José Acasuso (Argentina) Juan Martín del Potro (Argentina) David Nalbandian
23 Oct	Davidoff Swiss Indoors; Basel, Switzerland; ATP International Series $1,000,000 – carpet (i); Singles – Doubles	(The Bahamas) Mark Knowles (Canada) Daniel Nestor; 4–6, 6–4, [10–8]	(Poland) Mariusz Fyrstenberg (Poland) Marcin Matkowski	(Thailand) Paradorn Srichaphan (Switzerland) Stanislas Wawrinka	(Spain) David Ferrer (Argentina) José Acasuso (Argentina) Juan Martín del Potro (Argentina) David Nalbandian
30 Oct	BNP Paribas Masters; Paris, France; ATP Masters Series $2,200,000 – carpet (i); Singles – Doubles	(Russia) Nikolay Davydenko; 6–1, 6–2, 6–2	(Slovakia) Dominik Hrbatý	(Spain) Tommy Robredo (Germany) Tommy Haas	(Finland) Jarkko Nieminen (Croatia) Mario Ančić (Czech Republic) Tomáš Berdych (Russia) Marat Safin
30 Oct	BNP Paribas Masters; Paris, France; ATP Masters Series $2,200,000 – carpet (i); Singles – Doubles	(France) Arnaud Clément (France) Michaël Llodra; 7–6^{(7–4)}, 6–2	(France) Fabrice Santoro (Serbia) Nenad Zimonjić	(Spain) Tommy Robredo (Germany) Tommy Haas	(Finland) Jarkko Nieminen (Croatia) Mario Ančić (Czech Republic) Tomáš Berdych (Russia) Marat Safin

=== November ===
Week	Tournament	Champions	Runners-up	Semifinalists	Round robin
13 Nov	Tennis Masters Cup; Shanghai, China; Tennis Masters Cup $4,450,000 – hard (i); Singles – Doubles	(Switzerland) Roger Federer; 6–0, 6–3, 6–4	(United States) James Blake	(Spain) Rafael Nadal (Argentina) David Nalbandian	(United States) Andy Roddick (Croatia) Ivan Ljubičić (Russia) Nikolay Davydenko (Spain) Tommy Robredo
13 Nov	Tennis Masters Cup; Shanghai, China; Tennis Masters Cup $4,450,000 – hard (i); Singles – Doubles	(Sweden) Jonas Björkman (Belarus) Max Mirnyi; 6–2, 6–4	(The Bahamas) Mark Knowles (Canada) Daniel Nestor	(Spain) Rafael Nadal (Argentina) David Nalbandian	(United States) Andy Roddick (Croatia) Ivan Ljubičić (Russia) Nikolay Davydenko (Spain) Tommy Robredo
27 Nov	Davis Cup Finals; Moscow, Russia – carpet (i)	Russia 3–2	Argentina		

== Entry rankings ==
As of 26 December 2005
Rk	Name	Nation	Points
1	Roger Federer	SUI	6,725
2	Rafael Nadal	ESP	4,765
3	Andy Roddick	USA	3,085
4	Lleyton Hewitt	AUS	2,490
5	Nikolay Davydenko	RUS	2,390
6	David Nalbandian	ARG	2,370
7	Andre Agassi	USA	2,275
8	Guillermo Coria	ARG	2,190
9	Ivan Ljubičić	CRO	2,180
10	Gastón Gaudio	ARG	2,050
11	Fernando González	CHI	1,790
12	Marat Safin	RUS	1,730
13	Thomas Johansson	SWE	1,645
14	David Ferrer	ESP	1,620
15	Robby Ginepri	USA	1,520
16	Richard Gasquet	FRA	1,506
17	Juan Carlos Ferrero	ESP	1,500
18	Dominik Hrbatý	SVK	1,490
19	Tommy Robredo	ESP	1,490
20	Radek Štěpánek	CZE	1,440

Year-end rankings 2006 (25 December 2006)
Rk	Name	Nation	Points	High	Low	Change
1	Roger Federer	SUI	8,370	1	1	Steady
2	Rafael Nadal	ESP	4,470	2	2	Steady
3	Nikolay Davydenko	RUS	2,825	3	7	▲2
4	James Blake	USA	2,530	4	23	▲19
5	Ivan Ljubičić	CRO	2,495	3	9	▲4
6	Andy Roddick	USA	2,415	3	12	▼3
7	Tommy Robredo	ESP	2,375	5	23	▲12
8	David Nalbandian	ARG	2,295	3	8	▼2
9	Mario Ančić	CRO	2,060	7	23	▲12
10	Fernando González	CHI	2,015	7	21	▲1
11	Tommy Haas	GER	1,890	11	45	▲34
12	Marcos Baghdatis	CYP	1,860	8	55	▲43
13	Tomáš Berdych	CZE	1,705	10	27	▲11
14	David Ferrer	ESP	1,475	10	20	Steady
15	Jarkko Nieminen	FIN	1,460	15	29	▲13
16	Novak Djokovic	SRB	1,380	16	81	▲62
17	Andy Murray	GBR	1,370	16	64	▲47
18	Richard Gasquet	FRA	1,365	12	66	▼2
19	Radek Štěpánek	CZE	1,340	8	23	▲1
20	Lleyton Hewitt	AUS	1,315	4	20	▼16

== Statistics ==
=== Titles won by player ===
Total titles	Country	Player	Grand Slam	ATP Tour Finals	ATP Tour Masters Series	ATP Tour International Series Gold	ATP Tour International Series
12	SUI	Roger Federer	Australian Open, Wimbledon, US Open	Masters Cup	Indian Wells, Miami Masters, Rogers Cup, Madrid Masters	Tokyo	Qatar, Halle, Basel
5	ESP	Rafael Nadal	French Open		Monte-Carlo Masters, Rome Masters	Dubai, Barcelona	
5	RUS	Nikolay Davydenko			Paris Masters		Pörtschach, Sopot, New Haven, Moscow
5	USA	James Blake					Sydney, Indianapolis, Bangkok, Stockholm, Las Vegas
3	GER	Tommy Haas				Memphis	Delray Beach, Los Angeles
3	CRO	Ivan Ljubičić				Vienna	Chennai, Zagreb
3	FRA	Richard Gasquet					Nottingham, Gstaad, Lyon
2	ESP	Tommy Robredo			Hamburg Masters		Båstad
2	FRA	Arnaud Clément					Marseille, Washington, D.C.
2	CRO	Mario Ančić					's-Hertogenbosch, St. Petersburg
2	SCG/SRB	Novak Djokovic					Amersfoort, Metz
1	USA	Andy Roddick			Cincinnati Masters		
1	CZE	Radek Štěpánek				Rotterdam	
1	PER	Luis Horna				Acapulco	
1	ESP	David Ferrer				Stuttgart	
1	ARG	Agustín Calleri				Kitzbühel	
1	FRA	Florent Serra					Adelaide
1	FIN	Jarkko Nieminen					Auckland
1	ARG	José Acasuso					Viña del Mar
1	GBR	Andy Murray					San Jose
1	ESP	Carlos Moyá					Buenos Aires
1	CHI	Nicolás Massú					Salvador
1	AUS	Lleyton Hewitt					Queen's Club
1	ESP	Nicolás Almagro					Valencia
1	USA	Mardy Fish					Houston
1	BEL	Olivier Rochus					Munich
1	ARG	David Nalbandian					Estoril
1	AUS	Mark Philippoussis					Newport
1	SUI	Stanislas Wawrinka					Umag
1	CYP	Marcos Baghdatis					Beijing
1	AUT	Jürgen Melzer					Bucharest
1	RUS	Dmitry Tursunov					Bangalore
1	ITA	Filippo Volandri					Palermo

The following players won their first title:
- Nicolás Almagro – Valencia, Spain
- (Cyprus) Marcos Baghdatis – Beijing, China
- (Italy) Daniele Bracciali – Casablanca, Morocco
- (Serbia and Montenegro) / (Serbia) Novak Djokovic – Amersfoort, Netherlands
- (Peru) Luis Horna – Acapulco, Mexico
- (Austria) Jürgen Melzer – Bucharest, Romania
- (United Kingdom) Andy Murray – San Jose, USA
- (Finland) Jarkko Nieminen – Auckland, New Zealand
- (Czech Republic) Radek Štěpánek – Rotterdam, Netherlands
- (Switzerland) Stanislas Wawrinka – Umag, Croatia

Winners/runners-up by country:

#	Country	Wins	Runners-up
1.	Switzerland	13	4
2.	(Spain)	10	6
3.	USA	7	6
4.	Russia	6	5
5.	France	6	4
6.	Croatia	5	5
7.	Argentina	3	4
8.	(Germany)	3	1
9.	Australia	2	2
	Italy	2	2
11.	Serbia and Montenegro; Serbia	2	1
12.	Chile	1	6
13.	Belgium	1	4
	Czech Republic	1	4
15.	Austria	1	3
16.	(United Kingdom) Great Britain	1	2
17.	Finland	1	1
	Cyprus	1	1
19.	Peru	1	0
20.	Sweden	0	3
21.	Romania	0	1
	Ecuador	0	1
	Slovakia	0	1

== Prize money leaders ==
As of 18 December 2006

1.	(Switzerland) Roger Federer	US$8,343,885
2.	(Spain) Rafael Nadal	3,746,360
3.	(United States) Andy Roddick	2,214,890
4.	(Russia) Nikolay Davydenko	2,026,845
5.	(United States) James Blake	1,894,295
6.	(Croatia) Ivan Ljubičić	1,713,167
7.	(Spain) Tommy Robredo	1,454,675
8.	(Argentina) David Nalbandian	1,420,040
9.	(Croatia) Mario Ančić	1,276,265
10.	(Sweden) Jonas Björkman	1,221,485

== Retirements ==
Following is a list of notable players (winners of a main tour title, and/or part of the ATP rankings top 100 (singles) or top 50 (doubles) for at least one week) who announced their retirement from professional tennis, became inactive (after not playing for more than 52 weeks), or were permanently banned from playing, during the 2006 season:

- (United States) Andre Agassi (born April 29, 1970, in Las Vegas, Nevada) became a professional in 1986, won eight Grand Slam championships and competed in 15 Grand Slam finals, and was a 1996 Olympic gold medalist. He won four Australian Open titles and achieved the Career Grand Slam (all four Grand Slam championships) and was the first of two to achieve the Career Golden Slam (Career Grand Slam and Olympic gold medal), and the only man to win the Career Golden Slam and the ATP Tour World Championships (won in 1990). He also won 17 ATP Masters Series titles, and was part of a winning Davis Cup team in 1990 and 1992. Agassi was troubled by personal issues during the mid-to-late 1990s and sank to world no. 141 in 1997, prompting many to believe that his career was over. Agassi, however, returned to world no. 1 in 1999 and enjoyed the most successful run of his career over the next four years. He played his last match at the US Open against Benjamin Becker in August.
- Wayne Black (born 17 November 1973 in Salisbury, Rhodesia, now Harare, Zimbabwe) He turned professional in 1994 and reached his career-high doubles ranking of no. 4 in 2005. He won the Australian Open in 2005 and the US Open in 2001. He played his last career match at Wimbledon partnering Jeff Coetzee.
- Galo Blanco (born 8 October 1976, in Oviedo, Spain) turned professional in 1995 and reached a career-high ranking of world no. 40. He won one singles title on the ATP Tour. Blanco played his last professional match at the 2006 Torneo Godó against Guillermo Coria.
- Albert Costa (born 25 June 1975, in Lleida, Spain) turned professional in 1993 and reached a career-high ranking of world no. 6. He won the French Open in 2002 and was a quarterfinalist at the Australian Open. He won 12 career ATP titles. He played his last career match in Barcelona in April against Dominik Hrbatý.
- Nicolas Escudé (born 3 April 1976 in Chartres, France) turned professional in 1995 and reached his career-high ranking of no. 17 in 2000. He reached the semifinals of the Australian Open in 1998 and the quarterfinals at Wimbledon and the US Open in 2001 and 1999, respectively. He earned four career singles titles. In doubles, he reached his career-high ranking of no. 35 in 2003 and earned two career titles.
- (Czech Republic) Cyril Suk (born 29 January 1967 in Prague, Czechoslovakia) turned professional in 1988 and reached his career-high doubles ranking of world no. 7 in 1994. He won the US Open doubles tournament in 1998 and reached the quarterfinals of all the other Grand Slam events multiple times: Australian Open in 1992 and 1994, French Open in 1991, 2001, and 2002, and Wimbledon in 1994, 2002, and 2003. He earned a total of 32 career doubles titles. He won the mixed doubles at the French Open in 1991 and Wimbledon in 1996 and 1997, and reached the final at the Australian Open in 1998 and the US Open in 1995. His last match was in Vienna in October partnering Oliver Marach.

== See also ==
- List of male tennis players
- Tennis Masters Series
- Tennis Masters Cup
- 2006 WTA Tour
