= 2006 Countrywide Classic =

- Date: July 24–30 2006
- Edition: 80th
- Category: ATP International Series
- Draw: 32S /16D
- Prize money: $457,000
- Surface: Hard / outdoor
- Location: Los Angeles, U.S.
- Venue: Los Angeles Tennis Center

Champions

Singles
- (Germany) Tommy Haas

Doubles
- (United States) Bob Bryan / (United States) Mike Bryan
- Los Angeles Open

The 2006 Countrywide Classic was a men's tennis tournament played on outdoor hard courts at the Los Angeles Tennis Center in Los Angeles, California in the United States and was part of the International Series of the 2006 ATP Tour and of the 2006 US Open Series. It was the 80th edition of the Los Angeles Open and the tournament ran from July 24, 2006, through July 30, 2006. Prize money for the singles champion was $69,200, and the doubles champions received $23,570. Sixth-seeded Tommy Haas won the singles title, his second after 2004.

== Finals ==
=== Singles ===
(Germany) Tommy Haas defeated (Russia) Dmitry Tursunov 4–6, 7–5, 6–3

=== Doubles ===
(United States) Bob Bryan / (United States) Mike Bryan defeated (United States) Eric Butorac / (United Kingdom) Jamie Murray 6–2, 6–4
