= 2006 Open de Moselle =

- Date: 2–8 October
- Edition: 4th
- Category: International Series
- Draw: 32S / 16D
- Prize money: $355,000
- Location: Metz, France
- Venue: Arènes de Metz

Champions

Singles
- (Serbia) Novak Djokovic

Doubles
- (France) Richard Gasquet / (France) Fabrice Santoro
- Open de Moselle

The 2006 Open de Moselle was a men's tennis tournament played on indoor hard courts. It was the fourth edition of the Open de Moselle, and was part of the International Series of the 2006 ATP Tour. It took place at the Arènes de Metz in Metz, France, from 2 October through 8 October 2006. Third-seeded Novak Djokovic won the singles title.

== Finals ==
=== Singles ===
(Serbia) Novak Djokovic defeated (Austria) Jürgen Melzer 4–6, 6–3, 6–2

- It was Djokovic's 2nd title of the year, and his 2nd overall.

=== Doubles ===
(France) Richard Gasquet / (France) Fabrice Santoro defeated (Austria) Julian Knowle / (Austria) Jürgen Melzer 3–6, 6–1, [11–9]

- It was Gasquet's 1st title of the year, and the 1st of his career. It was Santoro's 3rd title of the year, and the 21st of his career.
