= 2006 Brasil Open =

- Date: 20–27 February
- Edition: 6th
- Category: International Series
- Draw: 32S / 16D
- Prize money: $355,000
- Surface: Clay / outdoor
- Location: Mata de São João, Brazil

Champions

Singles
- (Chile) Nicolás Massú

Doubles
- (Czech Republic) Lukáš Dlouhý / (Czech Republic) Pavel Vízner
- Brasil Open

The 2006 Brasil Open was an ATP Tour men's tennis tournament played on outdoor clay courts in Costa do Sauípe resort, Mata de São João, Brazil that was part of the International Series of the 2006 ATP Tour. It was the sixth edition of the tournament and was held from 20 February until 27 February 2006. Sixth-seeded Nicolás Massú won the singles title.

== Finals ==
=== Singles ===
(Chile) Nicolás Massú defeated (Spain) Alberto Martín 6–3, 6–4

- It was Massú's only singles title of the year and the 6th and last of his career.

=== Doubles ===
(Czech Republic) Lukáš Dlouhý / (Czech Republic) Pavel Vízner defeated (Poland) Mariusz Fyrstenberg / (Poland) Marcin Matkowski 6–1, 4–6, [10–3]

- It was Dlouhý's 1st doubles title of the year and of his career. It was Vízner's 1st doubles title of the year and the 10th of his career.

== Singles main draw entrants ==
=== Seeds ===
Country	Player	Rank^{1}	Seed
ARG	Gastón Gaudio	9	1
ESP	Juan Carlos Ferrero	16	2
ITA	Filippo Volandri	31	3
FRA	Florent Serra	37	4
ARG	Juan Ignacio Chela	44	5
CHI	Nicolás Massú	55	6
ESP	Alberto Martín	68	7
SCG	Boris Pašanski	58	8

^{1} Rankings as of 20 February 2006.

=== Other entrants ===
The following players received wildcards into the main draw:

- (Brazil) André Ghem
- (Brazil) Ricardo Mello
- (Brazil) André Sá

The following players received entry from the qualifying draw:

- (Spain) Nicolás Almagro
- (Argentina) Juan Martín del Potro
- (Spain) Daniel Gimeno Traver
- (France) Olivier Patience

The following players received entry as lucky losers:

- (Spain) Iván Navarro Pastor
- (Spain) Albert Portas

The following player received entry due to a protected ranking:

- (Brazil) Gustavo Kuerten

=== Withdrawals ===
Before the tournament

- (Argentina) Agustín Calleri (replaced by Portas)
- (Argentina) Mariano Zabaleta (replaced by Navarro Pastor)

== Doubles main draw entrants ==
=== Seeds ===
Country	Player	Country	Player	Seed
CZE	František Čermák	CZE	Leoš Friedl	1
ARG	Martín García	ARG	Sebastián Prieto	2
POL	Mariusz Fyrstenberg	POL	Marcin Matkowski	3
CZE	Lukáš Dlouhý	CZE	Pavel Vízner	4

=== Other entrants ===
The following pairs received wildcards into the main draw:

- (Brazil) Gustavo Kuerten / (Brazil) André Sá
- (Brazil) Ricardo Mello / (Brazil) Flávio Saretta

The following pairs received entry as alternates:

- (Italy) Francesco Aldi / (Italy) Alessio di Mauro
- (Spain) Nicolás Almagro / (Argentina) Sergio Roitman
