= 2007 Open de Moselle – Doubles =

Doubles
- 2007 Open de Moselle

Final
- Champions: (France) Arnaud Clément (France) Michaël Llodra
- Runners-up: (Poland) Mariusz Fyrstenberg (Poland) Marcin Matkowski
- Score: 6–1, 6–4

Events
| Singles | Doubles |
| ← 2006 · | Open de Moselle | · 2008 → |

Richard Gasquet and Fabrice Santoro were the defending champions, but chose not to participate that year.

Arnaud Clément and Michaël Llodra won in the final 6–1, 6–4, against Mariusz Fyrstenberg and Marcin Matkowski.

== Seeds ==
1. (Sweden) Simon Aspelin / (Austria) Julian Knowle (semifinals)
2. (France) Arnaud Clément / (France) Michaël Llodra (champions)
3. (Poland) Mariusz Fyrstenberg / (Poland) Marcin Matkowski (final)
4. (France) Julien Benneteau / (France) Nicolas Mahut (semifinals)

== Draw ==
=== Key ===
- Q = Qualifier
- WC = Wild card
- LL = Lucky loser
- Alt = Alternate
- SE = Special exempt
- PR = Protected ranking
- ITF = ITF entry
- JE = Junior exempt
- w/o = Walkover
- r = Retired
- d = Defaulted
- SR = Special ranking

=== Draw ===
First round
1 | (Sweden) S Aspelin (Austria) J Knowle | 6 | 6^{3} | [10]
(Germany) C Kas (Austria) O Marach | 0 | 7^{7} | [6]
(Argentina) M García (Argentina) S Prieto | 6 | 6^{2} | [8]
(United Kingdom) A Murray (United Kingdom) J Murray | 4 | 7^{7} | [10]
3 | (Poland) M Fyrstenberg (Poland) M Matkowski | 6 | 6
(Germany) P Kohlschreiber (Austria) S Koubek | 4 | 3
WC | (France) M Gicquel (France) S Grosjean | 6 | 6
WC | (France) J Haehnel (France) J Mathieu | 3 | 4
(France) P-H Mathieu (France) J-W Tsonga | 6^{9} | 6 | [10]
(Czech Republic) J Levinský (Slovakia) M Mertiňák | 7^{11} | 2 | [8]
ALT | (Chile) N Massú (Serbia) J Tipsarević | 4 | 2
4 | (France) J Benneteau (France) N Mahut | 6 | 6
(Czech Republic) F Čermák (Czech Republic) L Friedl | 3 | 2
(Argentina) A Calleri (Austria) J Melzer | 6 | 6
ALT | (Argentina) G Cañas (Ecuador) N Lapentti | 7 | 1 | [9]
2 | (France) A Clément (France) M Llodra | 5 | 6 | [11]

Quarterfinals
1 | (Sweden) S Aspelin (Austria) J Knowle | 6 | 6
(United Kingdom) A Murray (United Kingdom) J Murray | 4 | 3
3 | (Poland) M Fyrstenberg (Poland) M Matkowski | 6 | 7
WC | (France) M Gicquel (France) S Grosjean | 2 | 5
(France) P-H Mathieu (France) J-W Tsonga | 0 | 4
4 | (France) J Benneteau (France) N Mahut | 6 | 6
(Argentina) A Calleri (Austria) J Melzer | 3 | 4
2 | (France) A Clément (France) M Llodra | 6 | 6

Semifinals
1 | (Sweden) S Aspelin (Austria) J Knowle | 7^{7} | 4 | [8]
3 | (Poland) M Fyrstenberg (Poland) M Matkowski | 6^{3} | 6 | [10]
4 | (France) J Benneteau (France) N Mahut | 3 | 3
2 | (France) A Clément (France) M Llodra | 6 | 6

Final
3 | (Poland) M Fyrstenberg (Poland) M Matkowski | 1 | 4
2 | (France) A Clément (France) M Llodra | 6 | 6
