= 2006 Orange Prokom Open =

- Date: 31 July – 6 August
- Edition: 9th
- Category: International Series
- Draw: 32S / 16D
- Prize money: € 425,250
- Surface: Clay / outdoor
- Location: Sopot, Poland

Champions

Singles
- (Russia) Nikolay Davydenko

Doubles
- (Czech Republic) František Čermák / (Czech Republic) Leoš Friedl
- Orange Prokom Open

The 2006 Orange Prokom Open was the ninth edition of this men's tennis tournament and was played on outdoor clay courts. The tournament was part of the International Series of the 2006 ATP Tour. It took place in Sopot, Poland from 31 July through 6 August 2006. First-seeded Nikolay Davydenko won the singles title.

== Finals ==
=== Singles ===
(Russia) Nikolay Davydenko defeated (Germany) Florian Mayer, 7–6^{(8–6)}, 5–7, 6–4

- It was Davydenko's 2nd title of the year and the 7th of his career.

=== Doubles ===
(Czech Republic) František Čermák / (Czech Republic) Leoš Friedl defeated (Argentina) Martín García / (Argentina) Sebastián Prieto, 6–3, 7–5

- It was Čermák's 3rd title of the year and the 13th of his career. It was Friedl's 3rd title of the year and the 14th of his career.
