= 2006 Open de Moselle – Singles =

Singles
- 2006 Open de Moselle

Final
- Champion: (Serbia) Novak Djokovic
- Runner-up: (Austria) Jürgen Melzer
- Score: 4–6, 6–3, 6–2

Details
- Draw: 32
- Seeds: 8

Events
Singles	Doubles
← 2005 ·	Open de Moselle	· 2007 →

Ivan Ljubičić was the defending champion, but did not participate.

Novak Djokovic won the title, defeating Jürgen Melzer 4–6, 6–3, 6–2 in the final.

By winning this tournament, Djokovic became ATP nr. 16, entering the Top 20 for the first time in his career.

== Seeds ==
1. (Spain) David Ferrer (first round)
2. (Spain) Juan Carlos Ferrero (first round)
3. (Serbia) Novak Djokovic (champion)
4. (Russia) Mikhail Youzhny (first round)
5. (France) Richard Gasquet (second round)
6. (Slovakia) Dominik Hrbatý (first round)
7. (Spain) Fernando Verdasco (first round)
8. (Sweden) Robin Söderling (first round)

== Draw ==
=== Key ===
- Q = Qualifier
- WC = Wild card
- LL = Lucky loser
- Alt = Alternate
- ITF = ITF entry
- PR = Protected ranking
- SR = Special ranking
- SE = Special exempt
- JE = Junior exempt
- JR = Junior Accelerator Programme entrant
- CO = College Accelerator Programme entrant
- NG = Next Gen Accelerator Program entrant
- w/o = Walkover
- r = Retired
- d = Defaulted

=== Finals ===
Semifinals
WC	(France) Marc Gicquel	6^{3}	3
(Austria) Jürgen Melzer	7^{7}	6
3	(Serbia) Novak Djokovic	6^{4}	7^{7}	6
(France) Sébastien Grosjean	7^{7}	6^{1}	3

Final
(Austria) Jürgen Melzer	6	3	2
3	(Serbia) Novak Djokovic	4	6	6

=== Top half ===
First round
1	(Spain) D Ferrer	3	7	4
WC	(France) M Gicquel	6	5	6
(Spain) G García-López	7^{7}	4	6
(Italy) D Sanguinetti	6^{3}	6	0
(France) F Santoro	4	7	4
(France) P-H Mathieu	6	5	6
(France) F Serra	5	7^{7}	6
8	(Sweden) R Söderling	7	6^{3}	2
4	(Russia) M Youzhny	1	4
SE	(Russia) M Safin	6	6
(Austria) J Melzer	7	6
(Spain) A Montañés	5	2
Q	(France) T Ascione	6	3	2
(United States) M Fish	4	6	6
(Spain) R Ramírez Hidalgo	6	6
7	(Spain) F Verdasco	3	3

Second round
WC	(France) M Gicquel	6	6
(Spain) G García-López	2	3
(France) P-H Mathieu	6	3	6^{2}
(France) F Serra	1	6	7^{7}
SE	(Russia) M Safin	6	2	6^{5}
(Austria) J Melzer	4	6	7^{7}
(United States) M Fish	6	6
(Spain) R Ramírez Hidalgo	3	3

Quarterfinals
WC	(France) M Gicquel	6	7
(France) F Serra	4	5
(Austria) J Melzer	1	7	7
(United States) M Fish	6	5	5

Semifinals
WC	(France) M Gicquel	6^{3}	3
(Austria) J Melzer	7^{7}	6

=== Bottom half ===
First round
6	(Slovakia) D Hrbatý	6	3	3
Q	(France) C Saulnier	4	6	6
Q	(Germany) T Clemens	7	6^{2}	6
WC	(France) O Patience	5	7^{7}	3
(Italy) D Bracciali	4	6	7
(Germany) P Kohlschreiber	6	3	5
(France) N Mahut	2	3
3	(Serbia) N Djokovic	6	6
5	(France) R Gasquet	6	6
Q	(Ukraine) S Stakhovsky	3	1
(Belgium) X Malisse	6^{3}	2
(France) A Clément	7^{7}	6
(Germany) F Mayer	3	4
(France) S Grosjean	6	6
(France) J Benneteau	6	1	7^{9}
2/WC	(Spain) JC Ferrero	4	6	6^{7}

Second round
Q	(France) C Saulnier	6^{4}	7^{7}	6^{5}
Q	(Germany) T Clemens	7^{7}	6^{4}	7^{7}
(Italy) D Bracciali	0	3
3	(Serbia) N Djokovic	6	6
5	(France) R Gasquet	7^{7}	6^{3}	5
(France) A Clément	6^{3}	7^{7}	7
(France) S Grosjean	7	6
(France) J Benneteau	5	1

Quarterfinals
Q	(Germany) T Clemens	4	1
3	(Serbia) N Djokovic	6	6
(France) A Clément	7^{7}	3	2
(France) S Grosjean	6^{4}	6	6

Semifinals
3	(Serbia) N Djokovic	6^{4}	7^{7}	6
(France) S Grosjean	7^{7}	6^{1}	3
