= 2007 Open de Moselle – Singles =

Singles
- 2007 Open de Moselle

Final
- Champion: (Spain) Tommy Robredo
- Runner-up: (United Kingdom) Andy Murray
- Score: 0–6, 6–2, 6–3

Details
- Draw: 32
- Seeds: 8

Events
Singles	Doubles
← 2006 ·	Open de Moselle	· 2008 →

Novak Djokovic was the defending champion, but chose not to participate that year.

Tommy Robredo won in the final 0–6, 6–2, 6–3, against Andy Murray.

== Seeds ==
1. (Spain) Tommy Robredo (champion)
2. (Argentina) Guillermo Cañas (semifinals)
3. (United Kingdom) Andy Murray (final)
4. (France) Paul-Henri Mathieu (first round)
5. (Italy) Potito Starace (first round)
6. (France) Gilles Simon (first round)
7. (Germany) Philipp Kohlschreiber (second round)
8. (Russia) Igor Andreev (quarterfinals)

== Draw ==
=== Key ===
- Q = Qualifier
- WC = Wild card
- LL = Lucky loser
- Alt = Alternate
- SE = Special exempt
- PR = Protected ranking
- ITF = ITF entry
- JE = Junior exempt
- w/o = Walkover
- r = Retired
- d = Defaulted
- SR = Special ranking

=== Finals ===
Semifinals
1	(Spain) Tommy Robredo	7	4	6
(France) Nicolas Mahut	5	6	4
3/WC	(United Kingdom) Andy Murray	7^{7}	6
2	(Argentina) Guillermo Cañas	6^{2}	4

Final
1	(Spain) Tommy Robredo	0	6	6
3/WC	(United Kingdom) Andy Murray	6	2	3

=== Top half ===
First round
1	(Spain) T Robredo	4	7^{11}	6
(Germany) F Mayer	6	6^{9}	2
(France) A Clément	2	4
(Italy) A Seppi	6	6
LL	(Austria) O Marach	6	1	3
(France) S Grosjean	3	6	6
(Austria) S Koubek	6	6
6	(France) G Simon	2	1
4	(France) P-H Mathieu	4	1
(France) J Benneteau	6	6
WC	(France) M Montcourt	2	5
(France) N Mahut	6	7
(Chile) N Massú	6	4	6^{3}
(Ecuador) N Lapentti	3	6	7^{7}
(France) F Santoro	3	3
8	(Russia) I Andreev	6	6

Second round
1	(Spain) T Robredo	6	6
(Italy) A Seppi	4	2
(France) S Grosjean	7	6^{4}	2
(Austria) S Koubek	5	7^{7}	4^{d}
(France) J Benneteau	3	6	3
(France) N Mahut	6	3	6
(Ecuador) N Lapentti	3	3
8	(Russia) I Andreev	6	6

Quarterfinals
1	(Spain) T Robredo	6	6
(France) S Grosjean	4	4
(France) N Mahut	3	7	7^{7}
8	(Russia) I Andreev	6	5	6^{1}

Semifinals
1	(Spain) T Robredo	7	4	6
(France) N Mahut	5	6	4

=== Bottom half ===
First round
7	(Germany) P Kohlschreiber	6	6
(Argentina) A Calleri	3	1
(Switzerland) S Wawrinka	7^{8}	4	4
(France) J-W Tsonga	6^{6}	6	6
(France) M Llodra	4
(Austria) W Eschauer	1^{r}
(Serbia) J Tipsarević	4	6	2
3/WC	(United Kingdom) A Murray	6	1	6
5	(Italy) P Starace	3	3
Q	(Russia) E Korolev	6	6
(France) M Gicquel	6	7^{7}
WC	(France) F Serra	4	6^{0}
Q	(France) D Guez	5	7^{7}	2
Q	(Austria) J Melzer	7	6^{2}	6
Q	(Russia) M Ledovskikh	6^{1}	4
2	(Argentina) G Cañas	7^{7}	6

Second round
7	(Germany) P Kohlschreiber	7	6^{5}	3
(France) J-W Tsonga	5	7^{7}	6
(France) M Llodra	4	3
3/WC	(United Kingdom) A Murray	6	6
Q	(Russia) E Korolev	6	7^{7}
(France) M Gicquel	4	6^{3}
Q	(Austria) J Melzer	6^{3}	6^{6}
2	(Argentina) G Cañas	7^{7}	7^{8}

Quarterfinals
(France) J-W Tsonga	3	3
3/WC	(United Kingdom) A Murray	6	6
Q	(Russia) E Korolev	1	4
2	(Argentina) G Cañas	6	6

Semifinals
3/WC	(United Kingdom) A Murray	7^{7}	6
2	(Argentina) G Cañas	6^{2}	4
