= 2007 Open de Moselle =

Tennis tournament

- Date: 1–7 October
- Edition: 5th
- Category: International Series
- Draw: 32S / 16D
- Prize money: $391,000
- Location: Metz, France
- Venue: Arènes de Metz

Champions

Singles
- (Spain) Tommy Robredo

Doubles
- (France) Arnaud Clément / (France) Michaël Llodra
- Open de Moselle

The 2007 Open de Moselle was a men's tennis tournament played on indoor hard courts. It was the fifth edition of the Open de Moselle, and was part of the International Series of the 2007 ATP Tour. It took place at the Arènes de Metz in Metz, France, from 1 October until 7 October 2007.

The men's singles featured ATP no. 9, French Open quarterfinalist, Auckland and Beijing runner-up, Sopot champion Tommy Robredo, Miami Masters and Barcelona finalist, Costa do Sauípe winner Guillermo Cañas, and Doha finalist, San Jose titlist Andy Murray. Other seeds were Casablanca and Gstaad champion Paul-Henri Mathieu, Valencia and Kitzbühel runner-up Potito Starace, Gilles Simon, Philipp Kohlschreiber and Igor Andreev.

== Finals ==
=== Singles ===
(Spain) Tommy Robredo defeated (United Kingdom) Andy Murray 0–6, 6–2, 6–3

- It was Tommy Robredo's 2nd title of the year, and his 6th overall.

=== Doubles ===
(France) Arnaud Clément / (France) Michaël Llodra defeated (Poland) Mariusz Fyrstenberg / (Poland) Marcin Matkowski 6–1, 6–4
