= 2006 Brasil Open – Doubles =

Doubles
- 2006 Brasil Open

Final
- Champions: (Czech Republic) Lukáš Dlouhý (Czech Republic) Pavel Vízner
- Runners-up: (Poland) Mariusz Fyrstenberg (Poland) Marcin Matkowski
- Score: 6–1, 4–6, [10–3]

Details
- Draw: 16
- Seeds: 4

Events
Singles	Doubles
- Brasil Open

František Čermák and Leoš Friedl were the defending champions, but lost in the quarterfinals to Gustavo Kuerten and André Sá.

Lukáš Dlouhý and Pavel Vízner won in the final 6–1, 4–6, [10–3], against Mariusz Fyrstenberg and Marcin Matkowski.

== Seeds ==
1. (Czech Republic) František Čermák / (Czech Republic) Leoš Friedl (quarterfinals)
2. (Argentina) Martín García / (Argentina) Sebastián Prieto (semifinals)
3. (Poland) Mariusz Fyrstenberg / (Poland) Marcin Matkowski (final)
4. (Czech Republic) Lukáš Dlouhý / (Czech Republic) Pavel Vízner (champions)

== Draw ==
Key

- Q = Qualifier
- WC = Wild card
- LL = Lucky loser
- Alt = Alternate
- ITF = ITF entry
- PR = Protected ranking
- SR = Special ranking
- SE = Special exempt
- JE = Junior exempt
- JR = Junior Accelerator Programme entrant
- CO = College Accelerator Programme entrant
- NG = Next Gen Accelerator Program entrant
- w/o = Walkover
- r = Retired
- d = Defaulted

=== Draw ===
First round
1	(Czech Republic) F Čermák (Czech Republic) L Friedl	6	6
ALT	(Italy) F Aldi (Italy) A di Mauro	2	1
(Peru) L Horna (Chile) N Massú	6	4	[6]
WC	(Brazil) G Kuerten (Brazil) A Sá	4	6	[10]
3	(Poland) M Fyrstenberg (Poland) M Matkowski	6	6
ALT	(Spain) N Almagro (Argentina) S Roitman	3	3
(Spain) A Martín (Spain) F Vicente	7^{8}	7^{7}
(Spain) A Montañés (Spain) A Portas	6^{6}	6^{3}
(Czech Republic) D Škoch (Czech Republic) J Vaněk	6	6
(France) O Patience (France) F Serra	4	2
(Brazil) M Daniel (Argentina) J Mónaco	3	4
4	(Czech Republic) L Dlouhý (Czech Republic) P Vízner	6	6
(Greece) V Mazarakis (Serbia and Montenegro) B Pašanski	2	1
(Germany) T Behrend (Czech Republic) T Cibulec	6	6
WC	(Brazil) R Mello (Brazil) F Saretta	4	7^{7}	[5]
2	(Argentina) M García (Argentina) S Prieto	6	6^{5}	[10]

Quarterfinals
1	(Czech Republic) F Čermák (Czech Republic) L Friedl	4	2
WC	(Brazil) G Kuerten (Brazil) A Sá	6	6
3	(Poland) M Fyrstenberg (Poland) M Matkowski	6	6
(Spain) A Martín (Spain) F Vicente	2	1
(Czech Republic) D Škoch (Czech Republic) J Vaněk	4	5
4	(Czech Republic) L Dlouhý (Czech Republic) P Vízner	6	7
(Germany) T Behrend (Czech Republic) T Cibulec	4	2
2	(Argentina) M García (Argentina) S Prieto	6	6

Semifinals
WC	(Brazil) G Kuerten (Brazil) A Sá	4	6	[6]
3	(Poland) M Fyrstenberg (Poland) M Matkowski	6	3	[10]
4	(Czech Republic) L Dlouhý (Czech Republic) P Vízner	7	6
2	(Argentina) M García (Argentina) S Prieto	5	1

Final
3	(Poland) M Fyrstenberg (Poland) M Matkowski	1	6	[3]
4	(Czech Republic) L Dlouhý (Czech Republic) P Vízner	6	4	[10]
