= 2006 Next Generation Adelaide International – Doubles =

Doubles
- 2006 Next Generation Adelaide International

Final
- Champions: (Israel) Jonathan Erlich (Israel) Andy Ram
- Runners-up: (Australia) Paul Hanley (Zimbabwe) Kevin Ullyett
- Score: 7–6^{(7–4)}, 7–6^{(12–10)}

Events
Singles	Doubles
← 2005 ·	Next Generation Adelaide International	· 2007 →

Jonathan Erlich and Andy Ram defeated Paul Hanley and Kevin Ullyett 7–6^{(7–4)}, 7–6^{(12–10)} to secure the title.

== Seeds ==
1. (Australia) Paul Hanley / (Zimbabwe) Kevin Ullyett (final)
2. (Israel) Jonathan Erlich / (Israel) Andy Ram (champions)
3. (Austria) Julian Knowle / (Austria) Jürgen Melzer (first round)
4. (Australia) Jordan Kerr / (United States) Travis Parrott (second round)

== Draw ==
=== Key ===
- Q = Qualifier
- WC = Wild card
- LL = Lucky loser
- Alt = Alternate
- SE = Special exempt
- PR = Protected ranking
- ITF = ITF entry
- JE = Junior exempt
- w/o = Walkover
- r = Retired
- d = Defaulted
- SR = Special ranking

=== Draw ===
First round
1	(Australia) P Hanley (Zimbabwe) K Ullyett	6	7^{7}
ALT	(France) G Carraz (Monaco) J-R Lisnard	4	6^{1}
(Spain) A Martín (Spain) T Robredo	6	6
(Czech Republic) J Hernych (United States) J Thomas	3	4
3	(Austria) J Knowle (Austria) J Melzer	4	4
(Sweden) S Aspelin (South Africa) C Haggard	6	6
(Slovakia) D Hrbatý (Czech Republic) J Levinský	7^{7}	7
(France) P-H Mathieu (France) F Serra	6^{4}	5
(Sweden) R Lindstedt (Finland) J Nieminen	5	1
WC	(Belgium) X Malisse (Australia) M Philippoussis	7	6
(Czech Republic) T Berdych (Czech Republic) C Suk	6	3	[1]
4	(Australia) J Kerr (United States) T Parrott	3	6	[10]
WC	(Australia) C Guccione (Australia) N Healey	7^{7}	7^{7}
(Argentina) A Calleri (Argentina) J Chela	6^{3}	6^{1}
(United States) J Blake (Australia) S Huss	3	5
2	(Israel) J Erlich (Israel) A Ram	6	7

Quarterfinals
1	(Australia) P Hanley (Zimbabwe) K Ullyett	7^{12}	7^{7}
(Spain) A Martín (Spain) T Robredo	6^{10}	6^{3}
(Sweden) S Aspelin (South Africa) C Haggard	6	6
(Slovakia) D Hrbatý (Czech Republic) J Levinský	3	3
WC	(Belgium) X Malisse (Australia) M Philippoussis	6	6
4	(Australia) J Kerr (United States) T Parrott	3	3
WC	(Australia) C Guccione (Australia) N Healey	7^{7}	1	[4]
2	(Israel) J Erlich (Israel) A Ram	6^{5}	6	[10]

Semifinals
1	(Australia) P Hanley (Zimbabwe) K Ullyett	6	6
(Sweden) S Aspelin (South Africa) C Haggard	3	4
WC	(Belgium) X Malisse (Australia) M Philippoussis	2	2
2	(Israel) J Erlich (Israel) A Ram	6	6

Final
1	(Australia) P Hanley (Zimbabwe) K Ullyett	6^{4}	6^{10}
2	(Israel) J Erlich (Israel) A Ram	7^{7}	7^{12}
