= 2006 Brasil Open – Singles =

Singles
- 2006 Brasil Open

Final
- Champion: (Chile) Nicolás Massú
- Runner-up: (Spain) Alberto Martín
- Score: 6–3, 6–4

Details
- Draw: 32
- Seeds: 8

Events
Singles	Doubles
- Brasil Open

Rafael Nadal was the defending champion, but chose not to participate that year.

Nicolás Massú won in the final 6–3, 6–4, against Alberto Martín.

== Seeds ==
1. (Argentina) Gastón Gaudio (second round)
2. (Spain) Juan Carlos Ferrero (first round)
3. (Italy) Filippo Volandri (second round)
4. (France) Florent Serra (second round)
5. (Argentina) Juan Ignacio Chela (quarterfinals)
6. (Chile) Nicolás Massú (champion)
7. (Spain) Alberto Martín (final)
8. (Serbia and Montenegro) Boris Pašanski (quarterfinals)

== Draw ==
Key

- Q = Qualifier
- WC = Wild card
- LL = Lucky loser
- Alt = Alternate
- ITF = ITF entry
- PR = Protected ranking
- SR = Special ranking
- SE = Special exempt
- JE = Junior exempt
- JR = Junior Accelerator Programme entrant
- CO = College Accelerator Programme entrant
- NG = Next Gen Accelerator Program entrant
- w/o = Walkover
- r = Retired
- d = Defaulted

=== Finals ===
Semifinals
Q	(France) Olivier Patience	2	7	6^{3}
7	(Spain) Alberto Martín	6	5	7^{7}
(Argentina) Juan Mónaco	6	2	5
6	(Chile) Nicolás Massú	2	6	7

Final
7	(Spain) Alberto Martín	3	4
6	(Chile) Nicolás Massú	6	6

=== Top half ===
First round
1	(Argentina) G Gaudio	6	3	6
LL	(Spain) A Portas	3	6	3
Q	(France) O Patience	7^{7}	6
(Romania) R Sabău	6^{5}	3
(Costa Rica) JA Marín	6^{9}	6	0
WC	(Brazil) R Mello	7^{11}	3	6
(Germany) T Behrend	3	6	3
8	(Serbia and Montenegro) B Pašanski	6	1	6
3	(Italy) F Volandri	3	6	6
(United States) K Kim	6	3	0
(Czech Republic) J Vaněk	7^{8}	6
(Spain) A Montañés	6^{6}	1
WC	(Brazil) A Ghem	3	6	6
PR	(Brazil) G Kuerten	6	3	4
(Peru) L Horna	4	5
7	(Spain) A Martín	6	7

Second round
1	(Argentina) G Gaudio	2	2
Q	(France) O Patience	6	6
WC	(Brazil) R Mello	2	3
8	(Serbia and Montenegro) B Pašanski	6	6
3	(Italy) F Volandri	0	1
(Czech Republic) J Vaněk	6	6
WC	(Brazil) A Ghem	2	6	3
7	(Spain) A Martín	6	3	6

Quarterfinals
Q	(France) O Patience	4	6	6
8	(Serbia and Montenegro) B Pašanski	6	3	2
(Czech Republic) J Vaněk	6^{5}	3
7	(Spain) A Martín	7^{7}	6

Semifinals
Q	(France) O Patience	2	7	6^{3}
7	(Spain) A Martín	6	5	7^{7}

=== Bottom half ===
First round
5	(Argentina) JI Chela	7^{7}	6
Q	(Spain) D Gimeno Traver	6^{3}	3
LL	(Spain) I Navarro Pastor	3	6	3
(Italy) P Starace	6	3	6
(Argentina) J Mónaco	7	7
Q	(Argentina) JM del Potro	5	5
(Czech Republic) L Dlouhý	6	2	2
4	(France) F Serra	3	6	6
6	(Chile) N Massú	7^{7}	6
(Brazil) M Daniel	6^{3}	1
(Spain) F Vicente	6	2
(Argentina) C Berlocq	4	0	r
Q	(Spain) N Almagro	6	7^{7}
WC	(Brazil) A Sá	1	6^{3}
(Brazil) F Saretta	6	6
2	(Spain) JC Ferrero	4	3

Second round
5	(Argentina) JI Chela	6	7
(Italy) P Starace	4	5
(Argentina) J Mónaco	6	6
4	(France) F Serra	1	1
6	(Chile) N Massú	3	7^{8}	6
(Spain) F Vicente	6	6^{6}	3
Q	(Spain) N Almagro	7	7
(Brazil) F Saretta	5	5

Quarterfinals
5	(Argentina) JI Chela	3	2
(Argentina) J Mónaco	6	6
6	(Chile) N Massú	7^{7}	6
Q	(Spain) N Almagro	6^{4}	3

Semifinals
(Argentina) J Mónaco	6	2	5
6	(Chile) N Massú	2	6	7
