= 2006 Countrywide Classic – Singles =

Singles
- 2006 Countrywide Classic

Final
- Champion: (Germany) Tommy Haas
- Runner-up: (Russia) Dmitry Tursunov
- Score: 4–6, 7–5, 6–3

Details
- Draw: 32 (4 Q / 3 WC )
- Seeds: 8

Events
Singles	Doubles
- Los Angeles Open

Andre Agassi was the defending champion, but lost in the quarterfinals to Fernando González.

Tommy Haas won the tournament, beating Dmitry Tursunov in the final, 4–6, 7–5, 6–3.

== Seeds ==
1. (United States) Andy Roddick (quarterfinals, withdrew due to an oblique muscle injury)
2. (Australia) Lleyton Hewitt (first round)
3. (Chile) Fernando González (semifinals)
4. (United States) Robby Ginepri (quarterfinals)
5. (United States) Andre Agassi (quarterfinals)
6. (Germany) Tommy Haas (champion)
7. (Slovakia) Dominik Hrbatý (semifinals)
8. (Russia) Dmitry Tursunov (final)

== Draw ==
Key

- Q = Qualifier
- WC = Wild card
- LL = Lucky loser
- Alt = Alternate
- ITF = ITF entry
- PR = Protected ranking
- SR = Special ranking
- SE = Special exempt
- JE = Junior exempt
- JR = Junior Accelerator Programme entrant
- CO = College Accelerator Programme entrant
- NG = Next Gen Accelerator Program entrant
- w/o = Walkover
- r = Retired
- d = Defaulted

=== Finals ===
Semifinals
8	(Russia) Dmitry Tursunov	6	6
3	(Chile) Fernando González	4	2
7	(Slovakia) Dominik Hrbatý	2	5
6	(Germany) Tommy Haas	6	7

Final
8	(Russia) Dmitry Tursunov	6	5	3
6	(Germany) Tommy Haas	4	7	6

=== Top half ===
First round
1/WC	(United States) Andy Roddick	6	6
(South Africa) Rik de Voest	4	4
Q	(Germany) Benjamin Becker	5	3
WC	(United States) Scott Oudsema	7	6
WC	(United States) Sam Querrey	7	6
(United States) Vincent Spadea	5	4
(Thailand) Danai Udomchoke	6^{5}	6^{4}
8	(Russia) Dmitry Tursunov	7^{7}	7^{7}
3	(Chile) Fernando González	7^{7}	7^{7}
(Luxembourg) Gilles Müller	6^{5}	6^{5}
(Russia) Marat Safin	6	7
(United States) Mardy Fish	4	5
Q	(Switzerland) George Bastl	6	7^{7}
(France) Nicolas Mahut	3	6^{1}
(Belgium) Xavier Malisse	6^{10}	0
5	(United States) Andre Agassi	7^{12}	6

Second round
1/WC	(United States) Andy Roddick	6^{3}	6	6
WC	(United States) Scott Oudsema	7^{7}	3	2
WC	(United States) Sam Querrey	5	4
8	(Russia) Dmitry Tursunov	7	6
3	(Chile) Fernando González	6	6
(Russia) Marat Safin	4	2
Q	(Switzerland) George Bastl	7^{7}	2	1
5	(United States) Andre Agassi	6^{4}	6	6

Quarterfinals
1/WC	(United States) Andy Roddick
8	(Russia) Dmitry Tursunov	w/o
3	(Chile) Fernando González	6	3	7
5	(United States) Andre Agassi	4	6	5

Semifinals
8	(Russia) Dmitry Tursunov	6	6
3	(Chile) Fernando González	4	2

=== Bottom half ===
First round
7	(Slovakia) Dominik Hrbatý	7	7
Q	(United States) Zack Fleishman	5	5
LL	(United States) Michael Yani	4	6	3
(Germany) Lars Burgsmüller	6	3	6
(Denmark) Kenneth Carlsen	6	5	7^{7}
(Thailand) Paradorn Srichaphan	2	7	6^{3}
(United States) Justin Gimelstob	4	4
4	(United States) Robby Ginepri	6	6
6	(Germany) Tommy Haas	6	6
Q	(Australia) Wayne Arthurs	4	4
(Chile) Paul Capdeville	6	3	6
(France) Arnaud Clément	4	6	4
(Russia) Igor Kunitsyn	4	6	6
(Serbia) Janko Tipsarević	6	1	2
(United States) Paul Goldstein	6	6
2	(Australia) Lleyton Hewitt	4	4

Second round
7	(Slovakia) Dominik Hrbatý	7	6
(Germany) Lars Burgsmüller	5	4
(Denmark) Kenneth Carlsen	6^{5}	6	4
4	(United States) Robby Ginepri	7^{7}	3	6
6	(Germany) Tommy Haas	6	4	6
(Chile) Paul Capdeville	3	6	1
(Russia) Igor Kunitsyn	4	4
(United States) Paul Goldstein	6	6

Quarterfinals
7	(Slovakia) Dominik Hrbatý	7^{7}	6
4	(United States) Robby Ginepri	6^{0}	2
6	(Germany) Tommy Haas	6	6
(United States) Paul Goldstein	3	4

Semifinals
7	(Slovakia) Dominik Hrbatý	2	5
6	(Germany) Tommy Haas	6	7
