= 2006 Orange Prokom Open – Singles =

Singles
- 2006 Orange Prokom Open

Final
- Champion: (Russia) Nikolay Davydenko
- Runner-up: (Germany) Florian Mayer
- Score: 7–6^{(8–6)}, 5–7, 6–4

Events
Singles	Doubles
← 2005 ·	Orange Prokom Open	· 2007 →

Gaël Monfils was the defending champion, but did not participate.

Nikolay Davydenko won the title, defeating Florian Mayer 7–6^{(8–6)}, 5–7, 6–4 in the final.

== Seeds ==
1. (Russia) Nikolay Davydenko (champion)
2. (Spain) Tommy Robredo (second round)
3. (Argentina) Gastón Gaudio (second round)
4. (Argentina) Guillermo Coria (first round, retired due to a shoulder injury)
5. (Argentina) Juan Ignacio Chela (quarterfinals)
6. (Spain) Rubén Ramírez Hidalgo (first round)
7. (Italy) Filippo Volandri (semifinals)
8. (Argentina) Agustín Calleri (semifinals, retired)

== Draw ==
=== Key ===
- Q = Qualifier
- WC = Wild card
- LL = Lucky loser
- Alt = Alternate
- ITF = ITF entry
- PR = Protected ranking
- SR = Special ranking
- SE = Special exempt
- JE = Junior exempt
- JR = Junior Accelerator Programme entrant
- CO = College Accelerator Programme entrant
- NG = Next Gen Accelerator Program entrant
- w/o = Walkover
- r = Retired
- d = Defaulted

=== Finals ===
Semifinals
1	(Russia) Nikolay Davydenko	6	6
7	(Italy) Filippo Volandri	2	4
8	(Argentina) Agustín Calleri	2	3^{r}
(Germany) Florian Mayer	6	4

Final
1	(Russia) Nikolay Davydenko	7^{8}	5	6
(Germany) Florian Mayer	6^{6}	7	4

=== Top half ===
First round
1	(Russia) N Davydenko	6	6
(Belgium) C Rochus	1	2
(Argentina) J Mónaco	2	7^{7}	6
(Austria) J Melzer	6	6^{2}	4
(Germany) P Kohlschreiber	0	2
(Argentina) C Berlocq	6	6
(Czech Republic) L Dlouhý	6	6
6	(Spain) R Ramírez Hidalgo	4	2
3	(Argentina) G Gaudio	6	6^{4}	6
(Serbia and Montenegro) B Pašanski	1	7^{7}	4
(Austria) O Marach	6	7^{8}
(Germany) A Waske	4	6^{6}
(Argentina) M Zabaleta	6^{4}	5
(Spain) G García López	7^{7}	7
Q	(Spain) D Gimeno Traver	4	1
7	(Italy) F Volandri	6	6

Second round
1	(Russia) N Davydenko	7	6^{7}	6
(Argentina) J Mónaco	5	7^{9}	1
(Argentina) C Berlocq	5	7	6
(Czech Republic) L Dlouhý	7	5	0
3	(Argentina) G Gaudio	7	4	6^{4}
(Austria) O Marach	5	6	7^{7}
(Spain) G García López	3	6	4
7	(Italy) F Volandri	6	3	6

Quarterfinals
1	(Russia) N Davydenko	6	6
(Argentina) C Berlocq	0	4
(Austria) O Marach	2	3
7	(Italy) F Volandri	6	6

Semifinals
1	(Russia) N Davydenko	6	6
7	(Italy) F Volandri	2	4

=== Bottom half ===
First round
8	(Argentina) A Calleri	6	2	7^{7}
Q	(United States) H Armando	4	6	6^{4}
WC	(Poland) G Panfil	1	3
(Netherlands) R Sluiter	6	6
(Czech Republic) J Vaněk	7^{7}	6
(Italy) A di Mauro	6^{3}	0
WC	(Poland) M Przysiężny	5
4	(Argentina) G Coria	6^{r}
5	(Argentina) JI Chela	6	6
Q	(Chile) A García	3	2
(Brazil) M Daniel	4	0^{r}
Q	(Argentina) M Vassallo Argüello	6	2
WC	(Poland) Ł Kubot	1	2
(Germany) F Mayer	6	6
(Czech Republic) I Minář	6^{5}	6	4
2	(Spain) T Robredo	7^{7}	3	6

Second round
8	(Argentina) A Calleri	6	6
(Netherlands) R Sluiter	4	4
(Czech Republic) J Vaněk	3	1
WC	(Poland) M Przysiężny	6	6
5	(Argentina) JI Chela	6	6
Q	(Argentina) M Vassallo Argüello	2	1
(Germany) F Mayer	6	6
2	(Spain) T Robredo	2	4

Quarterfinals
8	(Argentina) A Calleri	6	6
WC	(Poland) M Przysiężny	4	2
5	(Argentina) JI Chela	4	0
(Germany) F Mayer	6	6

Semifinals
8	(Argentina) A Calleri	2	3^{r}
(Germany) F Mayer	6	4
