= 2006 Next Generation Adelaide International =

- Date: 2 – 8 January
- Edition: 29th
- Category: International Series
- Draw: 32S / 16D
- Prize money: $394,000
- Location: Adelaide, Australia

Champions

Singles
- (France) Florent Serra

Doubles
- (Israel) Jonathan Erlich / (Israel) Andy Ram
- Next Generation Adelaide International

The 2006 Next Generation Adelaide International was an ATP tournament held in Adelaide, Australia. The tournament was held 2 – 8 January 2006.

== Finals ==
=== Singles ===
(France) Florent Serra defeated (Belgium) Xavier Malisse 6–3, 6–4

=== Doubles ===
(Israel) Jonathan Erlich / (Israel) Andy Ram defeated (Australia) Paul Hanley / (Zimbabwe) Kevin Ullyett, 7–6, 7–6
