= 2006 Gerry Weber Open – Singles =

Singles
- 2006 Gerry Weber Open

Final
- Champion: (Switzerland) Roger Federer
- Runner-up: (Czech Republic) Tomáš Berdych
- Score: 6–0, 6–7^{(4–7)}, 6–2

Details
- Draw: 32
- Seeds: 8

Events
Singles	Doubles
- Gerry Weber Open

Roger Federer was the three-time defending champion, and won in the final 6–0, 6–7^{(4–7)}, 6–2, against Tomáš Berdych. Federer extended his tournament record by winning a fourth consecutive title in Halle. He also equalled Björn Borg's record of 41 consecutive match wins on grass.

== Seeds ==
1. (Switzerland) Roger Federer (champion)
2. (Germany) Nicolas Kiefer (withdrew due to a wrist injury)
3. (Finland) Jarkko Nieminen (second round)
4. (Cyprus) Marcos Baghdatis (first round)
5. (Czech Republic) Tomáš Berdych (final)
6. (Germany) Tommy Haas (semifinals)
7. (Belgium) Olivier Rochus (quarterfinals)
8. (Belgium) Kristof Vliegen (semifinals)

== Draw ==
Key

- Q = Qualifier
- WC = Wild card
- LL = Lucky loser
- Alt = Alternate
- ITF = ITF entry
- PR = Protected ranking
- SR = Special ranking
- SE = Special exempt
- JE = Junior exempt
- JR = Junior Accelerator Programme entrant
- CO = College Accelerator Programme entrant
- NG = Next Gen Accelerator Program entrant
- w/o = Walkover
- r = Retired
- d = Defaulted

=== Finals ===
Semifinals
1	(Switzerland) Roger Federer	6	6^{4}	6
6	(Germany) Tommy Haas	4	7^{7}	3
8	(Belgium) Kristof Vliegen	3	2
5	(Czech Republic) Tomáš Berdych	6	6

Final
1	(Switzerland) Roger Federer	6	6^{4}	6
5	(Czech Republic) Tomáš Berdych	0	7^{7}	2

=== Top half ===
First round
1	(Switzerland) R Federer	7^{7}	6
Q	(India) R Bopanna	6^{4}	2
Q	(Switzerland) G Bastl	2	3
(France) R Gasquet	6	6
(France) F Serra	6^{4}	3
(Russia) M Safin	7^{7}	6
WC	(Germany) A Waske	6	4	3
7	(Belgium) O Rochus	2	6	6
4	(Cyprus) M Baghdatis	6^{5}	3
WC	(Romania) A Pavel	7^{7}	6
(Germany) R Schüttler	3	6^{3}
(Sweden) R Söderling	6	7^{7}
(Italy) D Sanguinetti	6^{12}	5
(Italy) A Seppi	7^{14}	7
(France) G Simon	4	5
6	(Germany) T Haas	6	7

Second round
1	(Switzerland) R Federer	7^{9}	6^{7}	6
(France) R Gasquet	6^{7}	7^{9}	4
(Russia) M Safin	6	4	1
7	(Belgium) O Rochus	4	6	6
WC	(Romania) A Pavel	6	3	0
(Sweden) R Söderling	4	6	6
(Italy) A Seppi	1	2
6	(Germany) T Haas	6	6

Quarterfinals
1	(Switzerland) R Federer	6^{2}	7^{11}	7^{7}
7	(Belgium) O Rochus	7^{7}	6^{9}	6^{5}
(Sweden) R Söderling	5	4
6	(Germany) T Haas	7	6

Semifinals
1	(Switzerland) R Federer	6	6^{4}	6
6	(Germany) T Haas	4	7^{7}	3

=== Bottom half ===
First round
8	(Belgium) K Vliegen	6	6
(Switzerland) S Wawrinka	2	3
(Belgium) C Rochus	3	4
Q	(Switzerland) M Chiudinelli	6	6
(Germany) B Phau	5	6	6^{8}
(Germany) F Mayer	7	1	7^{10}
WC	(Germany) P Kohlschreiber	6^{3}	4
3	(Finland) J Nieminen	7^{7}	6
5	(Czech Republic) T Berdych	6	6
Q	(Germany) B Becker	4	3
(Serbia) B Pašanski	5	2
(Czech Republic) J Novák	7	6
(France) F Santoro	7^{7}	6
(Russia) M Youzhny	6^{4}	2
(France) A Clément	7	6
LL	(Denmark) K Pless	5	3

Second round
8	(Belgium) K Vliegen	7^{7}	6
Q	(Switzerland) M Chiudinelli	6^{4}	0
(Germany) F Mayer	6	3	6
3	(Finland) J Nieminen	4	6	4
5	(Czech Republic) T Berdych	6	6^{5}	7
(Czech Republic) J Novák	3	7^{7}	5
(France) F Santoro	6	7^{7}
(France) A Clément	4	6^{2}

Quarterfinals
8	(Belgium) K Vliegen	6	6^{5}	6
(Germany) F Mayer	3	7^{7}	4
5	(Czech Republic) T Berdych	7	7^{7}
(France) F Santoro	5	6^{3}

Semifinals
8	(Belgium) K Vliegen	3	2
5	(Czech Republic) T Berdych	6	6
