= 2006 Countrywide Classic – Doubles =

Doubles
- 2006 Countrywide Classic

Final
- Champions: (United States) Bob Bryan (United States) Mike Bryan
- Runners-up: (United States) Eric Butorac (United Kingdom) Jamie Murray
- Score: 6–2, 6–4

Details
- Draw: 16
- Seeds: 4

Events
Singles	Doubles
- Los Angeles Open

Rick Leach and Brian MacPhie were the defending champions, but did not participate this year.

Bob Bryan and Mike Bryan won in the final 6–2, 6–4, against Eric Butorac and Jamie Murray.

== Seeds ==
1. (United States) Bob Bryan / (United States) Mike Bryan (champions)
2. (United States) Travis Parrott / (United States) Jim Thomas (first round)
3. (Australia) Wayne Arthurs / (Australia) Jordan Kerr (quarterfinals)
4. (South Africa) Jeff Coetzee / (Slovakia) Dominik Hrbatý (semifinals)

== Draw ==
Key

- Q = Qualifier
- WC = Wild card
- LL = Lucky loser
- Alt = Alternate
- ITF = ITF entry
- PR = Protected ranking
- SR = Special ranking
- SE = Special exempt
- JE = Junior exempt
- JR = Junior Accelerator Programme entrant
- CO = College Accelerator Programme entrant
- NG = Next Gen Accelerator Program entrant
- w/o = Walkover
- r = Retired
- d = Defaulted

=== Draw ===
First round
1	(United States) B Bryan (United States) M Bryan	6	6
(France) A Clément (France) N Mahut	1	4
(United States) M Fish (United States) J Gimelstob	6	6
(Luxembourg) G Müller (Thailand) P Srichaphan	3	3
3	(Australia) W Arthurs (Australia) J Kerr	6	3	[12]
(Germany) L Burgsmüller (Denmark) K Carlsen	3	6	[10]
(Chile) P Capdeville (Chile) F González	6	2	[10]
(United States) V Spadea (Thailand) D Udomchoke	4	6	[5]
(Australia) S Huss (Belgium) X Malisse	3	2
(Russia) I Kunitsyn (Russia) D Tursunov	6	6
(Australia) A Fisher (United States) T Phillips	7	0	[9]
4	(South Africa) J Coetzee (Slovakia) D Hrbatý	5	6	[11]
WC	(United States) S Jenkins (United States) P Simmonds	6	3	[10]
WC	(United States) S Querrey (United States) K Van't Hof	3	6	[6]
(United States) E Butorac (United Kingdom) J Murray	6	6
2	(United States) T Parrott (United States) J Thomas	2	3

Quarterfinals
1	(United States) B Bryan (United States) M Bryan	6	6
(United States) M Fish (United States) J Gimelstob	3	4
3	(Australia) W Arthurs (Australia) J Kerr	6	3	[6]
(Chile) P Capdeville (Chile) F González	3	6	[10]
(Russia) I Kunitsyn (Russia) D Tursunov	6^{3}	3
4	(South Africa) J Coetzee (Slovakia) D Hrbatý	7^{7}	6
WC	(United States) S Jenkins (United States) P Simmonds	4	5
(United States) E Butorac (United Kingdom) J Murray	6	7

Semifinals
1	(United States) B Bryan (United States) M Bryan	7^{7}	6
(Chile) P Capdeville (Chile) F González	6^{3}	2
4	(South Africa) J Coetzee (Slovakia) D Hrbatý	6	3	[9]
(United States) E Butorac (United Kingdom) J Murray	4	6	[11]

Final
1	(United States) B Bryan (United States) M Bryan	6	6
(United States) E Butorac (United Kingdom) J Murray	2	4
