= 2006 Next Generation Adelaide International – Singles =

Singles
- 2006 Next Generation Adelaide International

Final
- Champion: (France) Florent Serra
- Runner-up: (Belgium) Xavier Malisse
- Score: 6–3, 6–4

Details
- Draw: 32
- Seeds: 8

Events
Singles	Doubles
← 2005 ·	Next Generation Adelaide International	· 2007 →

Florent Serra defeated Xavier Malisse, 6–3, 6–4 to win the 2006 Next Generation Adelaide International men's singles competition. Joachim Johansson was the defending champion.

== Seeds ==
1. (Australia) Lleyton Hewitt (second round)
2. (Slovakia) Dominik Hrbatý (semifinals)
3. (Spain) Tommy Robredo (second round)
4. (Croatia) Mario Ančić (second round)
5. (United States) James Blake (second round)
6. (Czech Republic) Tomáš Berdych (semifinals)
7. (Finland) Jarkko Nieminen (quarterfinals)
8. (Argentina) Juan Ignacio Chela (first round)

== Draw ==
=== Key ===
- Q = Qualifier
- WC = Wild card
- LL = Lucky loser
- Alt = Alternate
- SE = Special exempt
- PR = Protected ranking
- ITF = ITF entry
- JE = Junior exempt
- w/o = Walkover
- r = Retired
- d = Defaulted
- SR = Special ranking

=== Finals ===
Semifinals
6	(Czech Republic) Tomáš Berdych	4	0
(Belgium) Xavier Malisse	6	6
(France) Florent Serra	6	6
2	(Slovakia) Dominik Hrbatý	3	3

Final
(Belgium) Xavier Malisse	3	4
(France) Florent Serra	6	6

=== Section 1 ===
First round
1	(Australia) Lleyton Hewitt	4	6	6
(Czech Republic) Jan Hernych	6	2	4
(Germany) Philipp Kohlschreiber	6	6
WC	(Australia) Chris Guccione	4	3
Q	(Italy) Paolo Lorenzi	6	0	2
(United Kingdom) Andy Murray	3	6	6
(Argentina) Agustín Calleri	4	7^{7}	4
6	(Czech Republic) Tomáš Berdych	6	6^{5}	6
4	(Croatia) Mario Ančić	6	6
(France) Arnaud Clément	0	2
(Belgium) Xavier Malisse	7^{13}	6
WC	(Australia) Peter Luczak	6^{11}	3
(Serbia and Montenegro) Boris Pašanski	4	4
(Italy) Andreas Seppi	6	6
(Spain) Alberto Martín	3	3
5	(United States) James Blake	6	6

Second round
1	(Australia) Lleyton Hewitt	3	6	5
(Germany) Philipp Kohlschreiber	6	0	7
(United Kingdom) Andy Murray	6^{2}	6	1
6	(Czech Republic) Tomáš Berdych	7^{7}	4	6
4	(Croatia) Mario Ančić	6	3	6^{8}
(Belgium) Xavier Malisse	3	6	7^{10}
(Italy) Andreas Seppi	3	6	6
5	(United States) James Blake	6	3	4

Quarterfinals
(Germany) Philipp Kohlschreiber	1	4
6	(Czech Republic) Tomáš Berdych	6	6
(Belgium) Xavier Malisse	6	6
(Italy) Andreas Seppi	0	1

Semifinals
6	(Czech Republic) Tomáš Berdych	4	0
(Belgium) Xavier Malisse	6	6

=== Section 2 ===
First round
7	(Finland) Jarkko Nieminen	6	7^{7}
(France) Paul-Henri Mathieu	2	6^{5}
(Germany) Florian Mayer	6	6
(Argentina) Juan Mónaco	2	4
(France) Florent Serra	3	3
Q	(France) Michaël Llodra	6	1^{r}
(Austria) Jürgen Melzer	5	4
3	(Spain) Tommy Robredo	7	6
8	(Argentina) Juan Ignacio Chela	3	6	1
(Croatia) Ivo Karlović	6	3	6
Q	(France) Gregory Carraz	7	5	3
(Denmark) Kenneth Carlsen	5	7	6
WC	(Australia) Mark Philippoussis	6	3	6
(United States) Vincent Spadea	4	6	4
Q	(Australia) Rameez Junaid	3	5
2	(Slovakia) Dominik Hrbatý	6	7

Second round
7	(Finland) Jarkko Nieminen	7^{7}	7
(Germany) Florian Mayer	6^{1}	5
(France) Florent Serra	7^{7}	3	6
3	(Spain) Tommy Robredo	6^{4}	6	3
(Croatia) Ivo Karlović	6	6^{5}	4
(Denmark) Kenneth Carlsen	2	7^{7}	6
WC	(Australia) Mark Philippoussis	6	4	1
2	(Slovakia) Dominik Hrbatý	3	6	6

Quarterfinals
7	(Finland) Jarkko Nieminen	4	7^{7}	2
(France) Florent Serra	6	6^{4}	6
(Denmark) Kenneth Carlsen	5	3
2	(Slovakia) Dominik Hrbatý	7	6

Semifinals
(France) Florent Serra	6	6
2	(Slovakia) Dominik Hrbatý	3	3
