= 2006 Open de Moselle – Doubles =

Doubles
- 2006 Open de Moselle

Final
- Champions: (France) Richard Gasquet (France) Fabrice Santoro
- Runners-up: (Austria) Julian Knowle (Austria) Jürgen Melzer
- Score: 3–6, 6–1, [11–9]

Events
Singles	Doubles
← 2005 ·	Open de Moselle	· 2007 →

Michaël Llodra and Fabrice Santoro were the defending champions, but Llodra did not compete this year. Santoro teamed up with Richard Gasquet and successfully defended his title, by defeating Julian Knowle and Jürgen Melzer 3–6, 6–1, [11–9] in the final.

== Seeds ==
1. (Poland) Mariusz Fyrstenberg / (Poland) Marcin Matkowski (semifinals)
2. (Czech Republic) Martin Damm / (Czech Republic) Cyril Suk (first round)
3. (Austria) Julian Knowle / (Austria) Jürgen Melzer (final)
4. (Czech Republic) František Čermák / (Czech Republic) Jaroslav Levinský (first round)

== Draw ==
=== Key ===
- Q = Qualifier
- WC = Wild card
- LL = Lucky loser
- Alt = Alternate
- SE = Special exempt
- PR = Protected ranking
- ITF = ITF entry
- JE = Junior exempt
- w/o = Walkover
- r = Retired
- d = Defaulted
- SR = Special ranking

=== Draw ===
First round
1	(Poland) M Fyrstenberg (Poland) M Matkowski	6	6
(United States) M Fish (Italy) D Sanguinetti	1	3
(Switzerland) Y Allegro (Sweden) R Lindstedt	6	7^{7}
(Russia) M Safin (Russia) M Youzhny	4	6^{3}
4	(Czech Republic) F Čermák (Czech Republic) J Levinský	2	6	[3]
(Argentina) M García (Argentina) S Prieto	6	3	[10]
(France) R Gasquet (France) F Santoro	7	6
WC	(France) O Mutis (France) O Patience	5	2
(France) A Clément (France) S Grosjean	7	7^{7}
(France) M Gicquel (France) F Serra	5	6^{3}
WC	(France) T Ascione (France) PH Mathieu	1	2
3	(Austria) J Knowle (Austria) J Melzer	6	6
(Czech Republic) T Cibulec (Slovakia) D Hrbatý	4	2
(Czech Republic) L Friedl (Slovakia) M Mertiňák	6	6
(France) J Benneteau (France) N Mahut	6	6^{5}	[10]
2	(Czech Republic) M Damm (Czech Republic) C Suk	4	7^{7}	[6]

Quarterfinals
1	(Poland) M Fyrstenberg (Poland) M Matkowski	6	4	[16]
(Switzerland) Y Allegro (Sweden) R Lindstedt	4	6	[14]
(Argentina) M García (Argentina) S Prieto	4	6	[6]
(France) R Gasquet (France) F Santoro	6	3	[10]
(France) A Clément (France) S Grosjean	4	6	[6]
3	(Austria) J Knowle (Austria) J Melzer	6	4	[10]
(Czech Republic) L Friedl (Slovakia) M Mertiňák	4	5
(France) J Benneteau (France) N Mahut	6	7

Semifinals
1	(Poland) M Fyrstenberg (Poland) M Matkowski	7	6^{1}	[6]
(France) R Gasquet (France) F Santoro	5	7^{7}	[10]
3	(Austria) J Knowle (Austria) J Melzer	7	4	[10]
(France) J Benneteau (France) N Mahut	5	6	[2]

Final
(France) R Gasquet (France) F Santoro	3	6	[11]
3	(Austria) J Knowle (Austria) J Melzer	6	1	[9]
