= 2006 Orange Prokom Open – Doubles =

Doubles
- 2006 Orange Prokom Open

Final
- Champions: (Czech Republic) František Čermák (Czech Republic) Leoš Friedl
- Runners-up: (Argentina) Martín García (Argentina) Sebastián Prieto
- Score: 6–3, 7–5

Details
- Draw: 16
- Seeds: 4

Events
Singles	Doubles
- Orange Prokom Open

Mariusz Fyrstenberg and Marcin Matkowski were the defending champions, but lost in the first round.

== Seeds ==
1. (Poland) Mariusz Fyrstenberg / (Poland) Marcin Matkowski (first round)
2. (Austria) Julian Knowle / (Austria) Jürgen Melzer (quarterfinals)
3. (Czech Republic) František Čermák / (Czech Republic) Leoš Friedl (champion)
4. (Argentina) Martín García / (Argentina) Sebastián Prieto (final)

== Draw ==
Key

- Q = Qualifier
- WC = Wild card
- LL = Lucky loser
- Alt = Alternate
- ITF = ITF entry
- PR = Protected ranking
- SR = Special ranking
- SE = Special exempt
- JE = Junior exempt
- JR = Junior Accelerator Programme entrant
- CO = College Accelerator Programme entrant
- NG = Next Gen Accelerator Program entrant
- w/o = Walkover
- r = Retired
- d = Defaulted

=== Draw ===
First round
1	(Poland) M Fyrstenberg (Poland) M Matkowski	5	4
(Czech Republic) J Levinský (Czech Republic) D Škoch	7	6
(United States) H Armando (Belgium) C Rochus	1	7	[8]
WC	(Poland) G Panfil (Poland) M Przysiężny	6	5	[10]
4	(Argentina) M García (Argentina) S Prieto	6	6
(South Africa) C Haggard (Czech Republic) P Pála	2	3
(Chile) A García (Italy) S Vagnozzi	4	6	[10]
(Argentina) C Berlocq (Serbia and Montenegro) B Pašanski	6	4	[5]
(Spain) R Ramírez Hidalgo (Argentina) M Vassallo Argüello	6^{6}	6	[7]
(Brazil) M Daniel (Spain) G García-López	7^{8}	4	[10]
(Italy) A di Mauro (Italy) F Volandri	2	4
3	(Czech Republic) F Čermák (Czech Republic) L Friedl	6	6
(Poland) Ł Kubot (Austria) O Marach	7^{7}	7^{8}
(Czech Republic) T Cibulec (Czech Republic) J Vaněk	6^{4}	6^{8}
WC	(Poland) D Olejniczak (Poland) F Urban	7^{7}	3	[6]
2	(Austria) J Knowle (Austria) J Melzer	6^{3}	6	[10]

Quarterfinals
(Czech Republic) J Levinský (Czech Republic) D Škoch	4	6	[5]
WC	(Poland) G Panfil (Poland) M Przysiężny	6	4	[10]
4	(Argentina) M García (Argentina) S Prieto	6	6
(Chile) A García (Italy) S Vagnozzi	2	1
(Brazil) M Daniel (Spain) G García-López	2	1
3	(Czech Republic) F Čermák (Czech Republic) L Friedl	6	6
(Poland) Ł Kubot (Austria) O Marach	6	7^{7}
2	(Austria) J Knowle (Austria) J Melzer	4	6^{4}

Semifinals
WC	(Poland) G Panfil (Poland) M Przysiężny	4	2
4	(Argentina) M García (Argentina) S Prieto	6	6
3	(Czech Republic) F Čermák (Czech Republic) L Friedl	7^{7}	5	[10]
(Poland) Ł Kubot (Austria) O Marach	6^{1}	7	[3]

Final
4	(Argentina) M García (Argentina) S Prieto	3	5
3	(Czech Republic) F Čermák (Czech Republic) L Friedl	6	7
