= Tobias Clemens =

German tennis player

- Country (sports): Germany
- Residence: Boston, United States
- Born: 14 August 1979 (age 46) Bonn, West Germany
- Height: 1.85 m (6 ft 1 in)
- Turned pro: 2005
- Plays: Right-handed
- Prize money: US $95,871

Singles
- Career record: 2–2
- Career titles: 0
- Highest ranking: 191 (November 20, 2006)

Grand Slam singles results
- Australian Open: Q1 (2007)
- French Open: Q1 (2007)
- Wimbledon: Q1 (2007)
- US Open: –

Doubles
- Career record: 0–0
- Career titles: 0
- Highest ranking: 537 (February 25, 2008)

Tobias Clemens (German pronunciation: [toˈbiːas ˈkleːməns]; born 14 August 1979) is a former German professional tennis player, who played mainly on the ATP Challenger Tour and ITF Futures tournaments.

His best result was at ATP Metz 2006 where he reached the quarter-finals as a qualifier and lost to future world number one tennis player Novak Djokovic 4–6, 1–6.
