= 2006 Tennis Masters Cup =

- Date: 12–19 November
- Edition: 37th (singles) / 32nd (doubles)
- Category: Masters Cup
- Draw: 8S / 8D
- Prize money: $3,700,000
- Surface: Hard / indoor
- Location: Shanghai, China
- Venue: Qizhong Forest Sports City Arena

Champions

Singles
- (Switzerland) Roger Federer

Doubles
- (Sweden) Jonas Björkman / (Belarus) Max Mirnyi
- ATP Finals

The 2006 Tennis Masters Cup was a men's tennis tournament played on indoor hard courts. It was the 37th edition of the year-end singles championships, the 32nd edition of the year-end doubles championships, and was part of the 2006 ATP Tour. It took place at the Qizhong Forest Sports City Arena in Shanghai, China, from November 12 through November 19, 2006. Roger Federer won the singles title.

== Finals ==
=== Singles ===
(Switzerland) Roger Federer defeated (United States) James Blake 6–0, 6–3, 6–4

- It was Federer's 12th title of the year, and his 45th overall. It was his 3rd year-end championships title.

=== Doubles ===
(Sweden) Jonas Björkman / (Belarus) Max Mirnyi defeated (The Bahamas) Mark Knowles / (Canada) Daniel Nestor 6–2, 6–4

== Points and prize money ==
Stage	Singles	Doubles^{1}	Points
Champion	RR + $1,070,000	RR +$125,000	RR + 450
Runner-up	RR + $370,000	RR +$25,000	RR + 200
Round robin win per match	$120,000	$15,000	100
Participation fee	$90,000	$50,000	–

- RR is points or prize money won in the round robin stage.
- ^{1} Prize money for doubles is per team.
- An undefeated singles champion would earn the maximum 750 points and $1,520,000 in prize money ($120,000 participation, $360,000 undefeated round robin, $370,000 semifinal win, $700,000 final win)
- An undefeated doubles champion would earn the maximum 750 points and $220,000 in prize money ($50,000 participation, $45,000 undefeated round robin, $25,000 semifinal win, $100,000 final win). While each of them would get 1,500 points, the $220,000 would be split, so $110,000 for each member of the team.

== Points breakdown ==
=== Singles ===
Rank	Player	Grand Slam				ATP World Tour Masters 1000									Best Other					Total points	Tourn
Rank	Player	AUS	FRA	WIM	USO	IW	MIA	MC	ROM	HAM	CAN	CIN	MAD	PAR	1	2	3	4	5	Total points	Tourn
1	(Switzerland) Roger Federer	W 200	F 140	W 200	W 200	W 100	W 100	F 70	F 70	A 0	W 100	R32; 7	W 100	A 0	W 50	W 50	W 50	W 45	F 42	1,524	18
2	(Spain) Rafael Nadal	A 0	W 200	F 140	QF; 50	SF; 45	R64; 1	W 100	W 100	A 0	R16; 15	QF; 25	QF; 25	A 0	W 60	W 60	SF; 18	QF; 11	R16; 4	854	18
3	(Russia) Nikolay Davydenko	QF; 50	QF; 50	R128; 1	SF; 90	R32; 7	R16; 15	R64; 1	R16; 15	QF; 25	R64; 1	R64; 1	R32; 1	W 100	W 50	W 40	W 35	W 35	F 28	545	31
4	(Croatia) Ivan Ljubičić	QF; 50	SF; 90	R32; 15	R128; 1	QF; 25	F 70	QF; 25	R64; 1	R32; 7	R16; 15	QF; 25	R32; 1	A 0	W 50	W 35	W 35	F 24	QF; 10	479	21
5	(United States) Andy Roddick	R16; 30	R128; 1	R32; 15	F 140	R16; 15	QF; 25	A 0	QF; 25	A 0	A 0	W 100	R16; 15	A 0	F 28	SF; 20	SF; 22	SF; 15	QF; 15	463	20
6	(Spain) Tommy Robredo	R16; 30	R16; 30	R64; 7	R16; 30	R32; 7	R64; 1	QF; 25	R64; 1	W 100	R32; 7	SF; 45	R16; 15	SF; 45	F 42	W 35	SF; 15	QF; 12	QF; 8	455	26
7	(Argentina) David Nalbandian	SF; 90	SF; 90	R32; 15	R64; 4	R16; 15	SF; 45	R16; 15	SF; 45	A 0	R64; 1	R32; 7	SF; 45	A 0	W 40	QF; 15	QF; 12			439	16
8	(United States) James Blake	R32; 15	R32; 15	R32; 15	QF; 50	F 70	QF; 25	A 0	R64; 1	R16; 15	R32; 7	R32; 7	R32; 1	R16; 15	W 45	W 40	W 35	W 35	W 35	426	25

=== Doubles ===
Rk	Name	1	2	3	4	5	6	7	8	9	10	11	12	13	14	Total	Tour
1	(United States) Bob Bryan (United States) Mike Bryan	W 200	W 200	F 140	W 100	W 100	F 70	F 70	F 70	SF; 45	SF; 45	W 40	W 35	W 35	R16; 30	1,180	20
2	(Sweden) Jonas Björkman (Belarus) Max Mirnyi	W 200	F 140	W 100	W 100	W 100	W 50	QF; 50	QF; 50	SF; 45	SF; 45	SF; 45	SF; 45	F 31	QF; 25	1,026	16
3	(The Bahamas) Mark Knowles (Canada) Daniel Nestor	W 100	W 100	SF; 90	F 70	F 70	W 60	W 50	SF; 45	F 42	W 35	R16; 30	F 28	QF; 25	QF; 25	770	24
4	(Australia) Paul Hanley (Zimbabwe) Kevin Ullyett	W 100	SF; 90	SF; 90	F 70	W 60	W 50	QF; 50	W 45	W 45	SF; 45	SF; 45	F 28	QF; 25	F 24	767	22
5	(France) Fabrice Santoro (Serbia) Nenad Zimonjić	F 140	F 70	F 70	W 50	QF; 50	SF; 45	W 45	W 35	R16; 30	SF; 27	QF; 25	QF; 25	QF; 25	QF; 25	662	20
6	(Czech Republic) Martin Damm (India) Leander Paes	W 200	F 140	SF; 90	SF; 45	SF; 45	W 35	SF; 27	R16; 15	QF; 8	QF; 8	R16; 0	R16; 0	R16; 0	R16; 0	613	18
7	(Israel) Jonathan Erlich (Israel) Andy Ram	F 70	SF; 45	SF; 45	W 40	W 35	W 35	W 35	F 35	R16; 30	R16; 30	QF; 25	QF; 25	SF; 22	SF; 18	490	25
8	(Poland) Mariusz Fyrstenberg (Poland) Marcin Matkowski	SF; 90	F 42	F 35	W 35	R16; 30	F 28	QF; 25	QF; 25	F 24	F 24	QF; 25	SF; 22	R32; 15	R16; 15	435	30
