= 2006 ATP Masters Series =

Men's professional tennis tour

Details
- Duration: March 6 – November 6
- Edition: 17th
- Tournaments: 9

Achievements (singles)
- Most titles: (Switzerland) Roger Federer (4)
- Most finals: (Switzerland) Roger Federer (6)

The table below shows the 2006 Tennis Masters Series schedule.

The ATP Masters Series are part of the elite tour for professional men's tennis organised by the Association of Tennis Professionals.

== Results ==
* First-time champion

Masters	Singles champions	Runners-up	Score	Doubles champions	Runners-up	Score
Indian Wells Singles – Doubles	(Switzerland) Roger Federer	(United States) James Blake	7–5, 6–3, 6–0	(The Bahamas) Mark Knowles (Canada) Daniel Nestor	(United States) Bob Bryan (United States) Mike Bryan	6–4, 6–4
Miami Singles – Doubles	(Switzerland) Roger Federer	(Croatia) Ivan Ljubičić	7–6^{(7–5)}, 7–6^{(7–4)}, 7–6^{(8–6)}	(Sweden) Jonas Björkman (Belarus) Max Mirnyi	(United States) Bob Bryan (United States) Mike Bryan	6–4, 6–4
Monte Carlo Singles – Doubles	(Spain) Rafael Nadal	(Switzerland) Roger Federer	6–2, 6–7^{(2–7)}, 6–3, 7–6^{(7–5)}	(Sweden) Jonas Björkman (Belarus) Max Mirnyi	(France) Fabrice Santoro (Serbia and Montenegro) Nenad Zimonjić	6–2, 7–6^{(7–2)}
Rome Singles – Doubles	(Spain) Rafael Nadal	(Switzerland) Roger Federer	6–7^{(0–7)}, 7–6^{(7–5)}, 6–4, 2–6, 7–6^{(7–5)}	(The Bahamas) Mark Knowles (Canada) Daniel Nestor	(Israel) Jonathan Erlich (Israel) Andy Ram	6–4, 5–7, [13–11]
Hamburg Singles – Doubles	(Spain) Tommy Robredo*	(Czech Republic) Radek Štěpánek	6–1, 6–3, 6–3	(Australia) Paul Hanley (Zimbabwe) Kevin Ullyett	(The Bahamas) Mark Knowles (Canada) Daniel Nestor	6–2, 7–6^{(10–8)}
Toronto Singles – Doubles	(Switzerland) Roger Federer	(France) Richard Gasquet	2–6, 6–3, 6–2	(United States) Bob Bryan (United States) Mike Bryan	(Australia) Paul Hanley (Zimbabwe) Kevin Ullyett	6–3, 7–5
Cincinnati Singles – Doubles	(United States) Andy Roddick	(Spain) Juan Carlos Ferrero	6–3, 6–4	(Sweden) Jonas Björkman (Belarus) Max Mirnyi	(United States) Bob Bryan (United States) Mike Bryan	7–6, 6–4
Madrid Singles – Doubles	(Switzerland) Roger Federer	(Chile) Fernando González	7–5, 6–1, 6–0	(United States) Bob Bryan (United States) Mike Bryan	(The Bahamas) Mark Knowles (Canada) Daniel Nestor	7–5, 6–4
Paris Singles – Doubles	(Russia) Nikolay Davydenko*	(Slovakia) Dominik Hrbatý	6–1, 6–2, 6–2	(France) Arnaud Clément (France) Michaël Llodra	(France) Fabrice Santoro (Serbia) Nenad Zimonjić	7–6^{(7–4)}, 6–2

== Titles Champions ==
=== Singles ===
#	Player	IN	MI	MO	HA	RO	CA	CI	MA	PA	#	Winning span
1.	(United States) Andre Agassi	1	6	-	-	1	3	3	1	2	17	1990–2004 (15)
2.	(Switzerland) Roger Federer	3	2	-	3	-	2	1	1	-	12	2002–2006 (5)
3.	(United States) Pete Sampras	2	3	-	-	1	-	3	-	2	11	1992–2000 (9)
4.	(Austria) Thomas Muster	-	1	3	-	3	-	-	1	-	8	1990–1997 (8)
5.	(United States) Michael Chang	3	1	-	-	-	1	2	-	-	7	1990–1997 (8)
6.	(Spain) Rafael Nadal	-	-	2	-	2	1	-	1	-	6	2005–2006 (2)
7.	(United States) Jim Courier	2	1	-	-	2	-	-	-	-	5	1991–1993 (3)
	(Germany) Boris Becker	-	-	-	-	-	-	-	4	1	5	1990–1996 (7)
	(Brazil) Gustavo Kuerten	-	-	2	1	1	-	1	-	-	5	1999–2001 (3)
	(Chile) Marcelo Ríos	1	1	1	1	1	-	-	-	-	5	1997–1999 (3)
	(Russia) Marat Safin	-	-	-	-	-	1	-	1	3	5	2000–2004 (5)
12.	(Sweden) Stefan Edberg	1	-	-	1	-	-	1	-	1	4	1990–1992 (3)
	(Spain) Juan Carlos Ferrero	-	-	2	-	1	-	1	-	-	4	2001–2003 (3)
	(Ukraine) Andrei Medvedev	-	-	1	3	-	-	-	-	-	4	1994–1997 (4)
	(United States) Andy Roddick	-	1	-	-	-	1	2	-	-	4	2003–2006 (4)
16.	(Sweden) Thomas Enqvist	-	-	-	-	-	-	1	1	1	3	1996–2000 (5)
	(Spain) Carlos Moyá	-	-	1	-	1	-	1	-	-	3	1998–2004 (7)
18.	(Spain) Sergi Bruguera	-	-	2	-	-	-	-	-	-	2	1991–1993 (3)
	(Russia) Andrei Chesnokov	-	-	1	-	-	1	-	-	-	2	1990–1991 (2)
	(Argentina) Guillermo Coria	-	-	1	1	-	-	-	-	-	2	2003–2004 (2)
	(Spain) Àlex Corretja	1	-	-	-	1	-	-	-	-	2	1997–2000 (4)
	(South Africa) Wayne Ferreira	-	-	-	-	-	1	-	1	-	2	1996–2000 (5)
	(France) Guy Forget	-	-	-	-	-	-	1	-	1	2	1991
	(Australia) Lleyton Hewitt	2	-	-	-	-	-	-	-	-	2	2002–2003 (2)
	(Croatia) Goran Ivanišević	-	-	-	-	-	-	-	1	1	2	1992–1993 (2)
	(Netherlands) Richard Krajicek	-	1	-	-	-	-	-	1	-	2	1998–1999 (2)
	(Australia) Patrick Rafter	-	-	-	-	-	1	1	-	-	2	1998
	(Germany) Michael Stich	-	-	-	1	-	-	-	1	-	2	1993
29.	(Spain) Juan Aguilera	-	-	-	1	-	-	-	-	-	1	1990
	(Czech Republic) Tomáš Berdych	-	-	-	-	-	-	-	-	1	1	2005
	(Argentina) Guillermo Cañas	-	-	-	-	-	1	-	-	-	1	2002
	(Spain) Albert Costa	-	-	-	1	-	-	-	-	-	1	1998
	(Spain) Roberto Carretero	-	-	-	1	-	-	-	-	-	1	1996
	(Russia) Nikolay Davydenko	-	-	-	-	-	-	-	-	1	1	2006
	(France) Sébastien Grosjean	-	-	-	-	-	-	-	-	1	1	2001
	(Germany) Tommy Haas	-	-	-	-	-	-	-	1	-	1	2001
	(United Kingdom) Tim Henman	-	-	-	-	-	-	-	-	1	1	2003
	(Sweden) Thomas Johansson	-	-	-	-	-	1	-	-	-	1	1999
	(Czech Republic) Petr Korda	-	-	-	-	-	-	-	1	-	1	1997
	(Spain) Félix Mantilla	-	-	-	-	1	-	-	-	-	1	2003
	(Sweden) Magnus Norman	-	-	-	-	1	-	-	-	-	1	2000
	(Czech Republic) Karel Nováček	-	-	-	1	-	-	-	-	-	1	1991
	(Romania) Andrei Pavel	-	-	-	-	-	1	-	-	-	1	2001
	(Sweden) Mikael Pernfors	-	-	-	-	-	1	-	-	-	1	1993
	(Australia) Mark Philippoussis	1	-	-	-	-	-	-	-	-	1	1999
	(France) Cédric Pioline	-	-	1	-	-	-	-	-	-	1	2000
	(Spain) Albert Portas	-	-	-	-	1	-	-	-	-	1	2001
	(Spain) Tommy Robredo	-	-	-	1	-	-	-	-	-	1	2006
	(United Kingdom) Greg Rusedski	-	-	-	-	-	-	-	-	1	1	1998
	(Spain) Emilio Sánchez	-	-	-	-	1	-	-	-	-	1	1991
	(United States) Chris Woodruff	-	-	-	-	-	1	-	-	-	1	1997
#	Player	IN	MI	MO	HA	RO	CA	CI	ST	PA	#	Winning span

== See also ==
- ATP Tour Masters 1000
- 2006 ATP Tour
- 2006 WTA Tier I Series
- 2006 WTA Tour
