= 2006 WTA Tier I Series =

Women's professional tennis tour

Details
- Duration: January 30 – October 22
- Edition: 17th
- Tournaments: 10

Achievements (singles)
- Most titles: (Russia) Maria Sharapova (3)
- Most finals: (Russia) Maria Sharapova (4)

The WTA Tier I events are part of the elite tour for professional women's tennis organised by the WTA called the WTA Tour.

== Tournaments ==
Tournament	Country	Location	Surface	Date	Prize money
Toray Pan Pacific Open	Japan	Tokyo	Carpet (i)	Jan 30 – Feb 5	$1,340,000
Pacific Life Open	United States	Indian Wells	Hard	Mar 6 – 19	$2,100,000
NASDAQ-100 Open	United States	Key Biscayne	Hard	Mar 20 – Apr 2	$3,450,000
Family Circle Cup	United States	Charleston	Clay (green)	Apr 10 – 16	$1,340,000
Qatar Telecom German Open	Germany	Berlin	Clay	May 8 – 14	$1,340,000
Telecom Italia Masters	Italy	Rome	Clay	May 15 – 21	$1,340,000
Acura Classic	United States	San Diego	Hard	Jul 31 – Aug 6	$1,340,000
Rogers Cup	Canada	Montreal	Hard	Aug 14 – 20	$1,340,000
Kremlin Cup	Russia	Moscow	Carpet (i)	Oct 9 – 15	$1,340,000
Zurich Open	Switzerland	Zürich	Hard (i)	Oct 16 – 22	$1,340,000

== Results ==
* First-time champion

Tournament	Singles champions	Runners-up	Score	Doubles champions	Runners-up	Score
Tokyo Singles – Doubles	(Russia) Elena Dementieva*	(Switzerland) Martina Hingis	6–2, 6–0	(United States) Lisa Raymond (Australia) Samantha Stosur	(Zimbabwe) Cara Black (Australia) Rennae Stubbs	6–2, 6–1
Indian Wells Singles – Doubles	(Russia) Maria Sharapova	(Russia) Elena Dementieva	6–1, 6–2	(United States) Lisa Raymond (2) (Australia) Samantha Stosur (2)	(Spain) Virginia Ruano Pascual (United States) Meghann Shaughnessy	6–2, 7–5
Miami Singles – Doubles	(Russia) Svetlana Kuznetsova*	(Russia) Maria Sharapova	6–4, 6–3	(United States) Lisa Raymond (3) (Australia) Samantha Stosur (3)	(South Africa) Liezel Huber (United States) Martina Navratilova	6–4, 7–5
Charleston Singles – Doubles	(Russia) Nadia Petrova*	(Switzerland) Patty Schnyder	6–3, 4–6, 6–1	(United States) Lisa Raymond (4) (Australia) Samantha Stosur (4)	(Spain) Virginia Ruano Pascual (United States) Meghann Shaughnessy	3–6, 6–1, 6–1
Berlin Singles – Doubles	(Russia) Nadia Petrova (2)	(Belgium) Justine Henin	4–6, 6–4, 7–5	(China) Yan Zi* (China) Zheng Jie*	(Russia) Elena Dementieva (Italy) Flavia Pennetta	6–2, 6–3
Rome Singles – Doubles	(Switzerland) Martina Hingis	(Russia) Dinara Safina	6–2, 7–5	(Slovakia) Daniela Hantuchová*	(Czech Republic) Květa Peschke (Italy) Francesca Schiavone	3–6, 6–3, 6–1
Rome Singles – Doubles	(Switzerland) Martina Hingis	(Russia) Dinara Safina	6–2, 7–5	(Japan) Ai Sugiyama	(Czech Republic) Květa Peschke (Italy) Francesca Schiavone	3–6, 6–3, 6–1
San Diego Singles – Doubles	(Russia) Maria Sharapova (2)	(Belgium) Kim Clijsters	7–5, 7–5	(Zimbabwe) Cara Black (Australia) Rennae Stubbs	(Germany) Anna-Lena Grönefeld (United States) Meghann Shaughnessy	6–2, 6–2
Montréal Singles – Doubles	(Serbia) Ana Ivanovic*	(Switzerland) Martina Hingis	6–2, 6–3	(United States) Martina Navratilova (Russia) Nadia Petrova	(Zimbabwe) Cara Black (Germany) Anna-Lena Grönefeld	6–1, 6–2
Moscow Singles – Doubles	(Russia) Anna Chakvetadze*	(Russia) Nadia Petrova	6–4, 6–4	(Czech Republic) Květa Peschke* (Italy) Francesca Schiavone*	(Czech Republic) Iveta Benešová (Russia) Galina Voskoboeva	6–4, 6–7^{(4–7)}, 6–1
Zürich Singles – Doubles	(Russia) Maria Sharapova (3)	(Slovakia) Daniela Hantuchová	6–1, 4–6, 6–3	(Zimbabwe) Cara Black (2) (Australia) Rennae Stubbs (2)	(South Africa) Liezel Huber (Slovenia) Katarina Srebotnik	7–5, 7–5

== See also ==
- WTA Tier I events
- 2006 WTA Tour
- 2006 ATP Masters Series
- 2006 ATP Tour
