= 2006 BNP Paribas Masters =

- Date: 30 October – 6 November
- Edition: 34th
- Category: Masters Series
- Draw: 48S / 16D
- Prize money: $2,200,000
- Surface: Carpet / indoor
- Location: Paris, France
- Venue: Palais omnisports de Paris-Bercy

Champions

Singles
- (Russia) Nikolay Davydenko

Doubles
- (France) Arnaud Clément / (France) Michaël Llodra
← 2005 ·	Paris Masters	· 2007 →

The 2006 Paris Masters (also known as the BNP Paribas Masters for sponsorship reasons) was a men's tennis tournament played on indoor carpet courts. It was the 34th edition of the Paris Masters, and was part of the ATP Masters Series of the 2006 ATP Tour. It took place at the Palais omnisports de Paris-Bercy in Paris, France, from 30 October through 6 November 2006.

The announced singles draw featured World No. 1, Australian Open, Wimbledon and US Open champion, French Open runner-up, Indian Wells, Miami, Toronto and 2006 Madrid Masters winner Roger Federer, ATP No. 2 French Open, Monte Carlo and Rome titlist Rafael Nadal, and third-ranked Australian Open and French Open semifinalist, Estoril winner David Nalbandian. Also lined up were US Open semifinalist, Pörtschach, Sopot, New Haven and Moscow champion Nikolay Davydenko, Vienna, Madrid and Basel finalist Fernando González, Tommy Robredo, James Blake and Tomáš Berdych.

== Finals ==
=== Singles ===
(Russia) Nikolay Davydenko defeated (Slovakia) Dominik Hrbatý, 6–1, 6–2, 6–2

- It was Davydenko's 5th title of the year, and his 10th overall. It was his 1st career Masters title.

=== Doubles ===
(France) Arnaud Clément / (France) Michaël Llodra defeated (France) Fabrice Santoro / (Serbia) Nenad Zimonjić, 6–3, 7–6^{(7–4)}.
