= 2006 Mutua Madrileña Masters Madrid =

- Date: 16–23 October
- Edition: 5th
- Category: ATP Masters Series
- Draw: 48S / 16D
- Prize money: $2,200,000
- Surface: Hard / indoor
- Location: Madrid, Spain
- Venue: Madrid Arena

Champions

Singles
- (Switzerland) Roger Federer

Doubles
- (United States) Bob Bryan / (United States) Mike Bryan
- Madrid Open

The 2006 Madrid Masters (also known as the Mutua Madrileña Masters Madrid for sponsorship reasons) was a tennis tournament played on indoor hard courts. It is the 5th edition of the Madrid Masters, and is part of the ATP Masters Series of the 2006 ATP Tour. It took place at the Madrid Arena in Madrid, Spain, from October 16 through October 23, 2006. First-seeded Roger Federer won the singles title.

The singles field was led by World No. 1, Australian Open, Wimbledon and U.S. Open, Indian Wells, Miami, Toronto Masters champion Roger Federer, ATP No. 2, French Open, Madrid defending champion, Monte Carlo and Rome winner Rafael Nadal, and Chennai, Zagreb and Vienna titlist Ivan Ljubičić. Other top seeds were Estoril champion and 2005 Masters Cup winner David Nalbandian, New Haven and Kremlin Cup titlist Nikolay Davydenko, Andy Roddick, Tommy Robredo and James Blake.

== Finals ==
=== Singles ===
(Switzerland) Roger Federer defeated (Chile) Fernando González 7–5, 6–1, 6–0

- It was Roger Federer's 10th title of the year and his 43rd overall. It was his 4th Masters Series title of the year and his 12th overall.

=== Doubles ===
(United States) Bob Bryan / (United States) Mike Bryan defeated (The Bahamas) Mark Knowles / (Canada) Daniel Nestor 7–5, 6–4
