= 2006 Legg Mason Tennis Classic – Doubles =

Tennis tournament

Doubles
- 2006 Legg Mason Tennis Classic

Final
- Champion: (United States) Bob Bryan (United States) Bob Bryan
- Runner-up: (Australia) Paul Hanley (Zimbabwe) Kevin Ullyett
- Score: 6–3, 5–7, [10–3]

Details
- Draw: 16
- Seeds: 4

Events
Singles	Doubles
← 2005 ·	Washington Open	· 2007 →

Bob Bryan and Mike Bryan were the defending champions. They successfully defended their title, defeating Paul Hanley and Kevin Ullyett 6–3, 5–7, [10–3] in the final.

== Seeds ==
1. (United States) Bob Bryan / (United States) Mike Bryan (champions)
2. (Australia) Paul Hanley / (Zimbabwe) Kevin Ullyett (final)
3. (Israel) Jonathan Erlich / (Israel) Andy Ram (semifinals)
4. (Czech Republic) Martin Damm / (India) Leander Paes (first round)

== Draw ==
=== Key ===
- Q = Qualifier
- WC = Wild card
- LL = Lucky loser
- Alt = Alternate
- SE = Special exempt
- PR = Protected ranking
- ITF = ITF entry
- JE = Junior exempt
- w/o = Walkover
- r = Retired
- d = Defaulted
- SR = Special ranking

=== Draw ===
First round
1	(United States) B Bryan (United States) M Bryan	6	6
(Australia) J Kerr (United States) B Reynolds	4	2
(France) A Clément (France) S Grosjean	4	5
(United States) P Goldstein (United States) J Thomas	6	7
4	(Czech Republic) M Damm (India) L Paes	3	4
WC	(Paraguay) R Delgado (United States) R Leach	6	6
(United States) J Gimelstob (United Kingdom) T Henman	6^{13}	4
(Russia) I Kunitsyn (Russia) D Tursunov	7^{15}	6
(Thailand) P Srichaphan (Thailand) D Udomchoke	2	1
(Australia) A Fisher (United States) T Phillips	6	6
WC	(United States) S Oudsema (United States) S Querrey	3	4
3	(Israel) J Erlich (Israel) A Ram	6	6
(France) N Mahut (Luxembourg) G Müller	6	6^{3}	[10]
(Australia) S Huss (South Africa) W Moodie	4	7^{7}	[5]
(South Africa) J Coetzee (Slovakia) D Hrbatý	1	5
2	(Australia) P Hanley (Zimbabwe) K Ullyett	6	7

Quarterfinals
1	(United States) B Bryan (United States) M Bryan	6	6^{5}	[10]
(United States) P Goldstein (United States) J Thomas	2	7^{7}	[6]
WC	(Paraguay) R Delgado (United States) R Leach	4	3
(Russia) I Kunitsyn (Russia) D Tursunov	6	6
(Australia) A Fisher (United States) T Phillips	1	4
3	(Israel) J Erlich (Israel) A Ram	6	6
(France) N Mahut (Luxembourg) G Müller	1	2
2	(Australia) P Hanley (Zimbabwe) K Ullyett	6	6

Semifinals
1	(United States) B Bryan (United States) M Bryan	6	6
(Russia) I Kunitsyn (Russia) D Tursunov	0	3
3	(Israel) J Erlich (Israel) A Ram	4	6^{4}
2	(Australia) P Hanley (Zimbabwe) K Ullyett	6	7^{7}

Final
1	(United States) B Bryan (United States) M Bryan	6	5	[10]
2	(Australia) P Hanley (Zimbabwe) K Ullyett	3	7	[3]
