= 2006 Hamburg Masters =

- Date: 15–22 May
- Edition: 100th
- Category: ATP Masters Series
- Draw: 64S / 24D
- Prize money: $2,200,000
- Surface: Clay / outdoor
- Location: Hamburg, Germany
- Venue: Rothenbaum Tennis Center

Champions

Singles
- (Spain) Tommy Robredo

Doubles
- (Canada) Daniel Nestor / (Serbia and Montenegro) Nenad Zimonjić
← 2005 ·	Hamburg Masters	· 2007 →

The 2006 Hamburg Masters was a men's tennis tournament played on outdoor clay courts. It was the 100th edition of the Hamburg Masters, and was part of the ATP Masters Series of the 2006 ATP Tour. It took place at the Rothenbaum Tennis Center in Hamburg, Germany, from 15 May through 22 May 2006.

The top two seeds, world number one Roger Federer and number two Rafael Nadal, both withdrew from the singles draw before the tournament started with fatigue. Lukáš Dlouhý and Robin Söderling came in as unseeded replacements.

The men's field was therefore headlined by ATP No. 3 and 2005 Madrid Masters, 2005 Paris Masters and Miami finalist Ivan Ljubičić, Kremlin Cup and New Haven winner Nikolay Davydenko, and Indian Wells runner-up and Stockholm, Bangkok winner James Blake. Other top seeds competing were 2004 French Open champion Gastón Gaudio, Fernando González and Tommy Robredo.

== Finals ==
=== Singles ===
(Spain) Tommy Robredo defeated (Czech Republic) Radek Štěpánek 6–1, 6–3, 6–3

- It was Tommy Robredo's 1st title of the year, and his 3rd overall. It was his 1st Masters title of the year, and overall.

=== Doubles ===
(Australia) Paul Hanley / (Zimbabwe) Kevin Ullyett defeated (The Bahamas) Mark Knowles / (Canada) Daniel Nestor 6–2, 7–6^{(10–8)}
