= 2006 Tennis Masters Cup – Singles =

Singles
- 2006 Tennis Masters Cup

Final
- Champion: (Switzerland) Roger Federer
- Runner-up: (United States) James Blake
- Score: 6–0, 6–3, 6–4

Details
- Draw: 8

Events
Singles	Doubles
← 2005 ·	ATP Finals	· 2007 →

Roger Federer defeated James Blake in the final, 6–0, 6–3, 6–4 to win the singles tennis title at the 2006 Tennis Masters Cup. It was his third Tour Finals title.

David Nalbandian was the defending champion, but was defeated in the semifinals by Blake.

== Seeds ==
1. (Switzerland) Roger Federer (champion)
2. (Spain) Rafael Nadal (semifinals)
3. (Russia) Nikolay Davydenko (round robin)
4. (Croatia) Ivan Ljubičić (round robin)
5. (United States) Andy Roddick (round robin)
6. (Spain) Tommy Robredo (round robin)
7. (Argentina) David Nalbandian (semifinals)
8. (United States) James Blake (final)

== Alternates ==
1. (Croatia) Mario Ančić (Did not play)
2. (Czech Republic) Tomáš Berdych (Did not play)

== Draw ==
=== Key ===
- Q = Qualifier
- WC = Wild card
- LL = Lucky loser
- Alt = Alternate
- SE = Special exempt
- PR = Protected ranking
- ITF = ITF entry
- JE = Junior exempt
- w/o = Walkover
- r = Retired
- d = Defaulted
- SR = Special ranking

=== Finals ===
Semifinals
1	(Switzerland) Roger Federer	6	7
2	(Spain) Rafael Nadal	4	5
8	(United States) James Blake	6	6
7	(Argentina) David Nalbandian	4	1

Final
1	(Switzerland) Roger Federer	6	6	6
8	(United States) James Blake	0	3	4

=== Red group ===
		(Switzerland) Federer	(Croatia) Ljubičić	(United States) Roddick	(Argentina) Nalbandian	RR W–L	Set W–L	Game W–L	Standings
1	(Switzerland) Roger Federer		7–6^{(7–2)}, 6–4	4–6, 7–6^{(10–8)}, 6–4	3–6, 6–1, 6–1	3–0	6–2 (75.00%)	45–34	1
4	(Croatia) Ivan Ljubičić	6–7^{(2–7)}, 4–6		4–6, 7–6^{(11–9)}, 1–6	5–7, 7–6^{(9–7)}, 7–5	1–2	3–5 (37.50%)	41–49	4
5	(United States) Andy Roddick	6–4, 6–7^{(8–10)}, 4–6	6–4, 6–7^{(9–11)}, 6–1		2–6, 6–7^{(4–7)}	1–2	3–5 (37.50%)	42–42	3
7	(Argentina) David Nalbandian	6–3, 1–6, 1–6	7–5, 6–7^{(7–9)}, 5–7	6–2, 7–6^{(7–4)}		1–2	4–4 (50.00%)	39–42	2

Standings are determined by: 1. number of wins; 2. number of matches; 3. in two-players-ties, head-to-head records; 4. in three-players-ties, percentage of sets won, or of games won; 5. steering-committee decision.

=== Gold group ===
		(Spain) Nadal	(Russia) Davydenko	(Spain) Robredo	(United States) Blake	RR W–L	Set W–L	Game W–L	Standings
2	(Spain) Rafael Nadal		5–7, 6–4, 6–4	7–6^{(7–2)}, 6–2	4–6, 6–7^{(0–7)}	2–1	4–3	40–36	2
3	(Russia) Nikolay Davydenko	7–5, 4–6, 4–6		7–6^{(10–8)}, 3–6, 6–1	6–2, 4–6, 5–7	1–2	4–5	46–45	3
6	(Spain) Tommy Robredo	6–7^{(2–7)}, 2–6	6–7^{(8–10)}, 6–3, 1–6		6–2, 3–6, 7–5	1–2	3–5	37–42	4
8	(United States) James Blake	6–4, 7–6^{(7–0)}	2–6, 6–4, 7–5	2–6, 6–3, 5–7		2–1	5–3	41–41	1

Standings are determined by: 1. number of wins; 2. number of matches; 3. in two-players-ties, head-to-head records; 4. in three-players-ties, percentage of sets won, or of games won; 5. steering-committee decision.

== See also ==
- ATP World Tour Finals appearances
