= 2006 Open 13 – Doubles =

Doubles
- 2006 Open 13

Final
- Champions: (Czech Republic) Martin Damm (Czech Republic) Radek Štěpánek
- Runners-up: (The Bahamas) Mark Knowles (Canada) Daniel Nestor
- Score: 6–2, 6–7^{(4–7)}, [10–3]

Events
Singles	Doubles
← 2005 ·	Open 13	· 2007 →

Martin Damm and Radek Štěpánek were the defending champions and successfully defended their title, winning in the final 6–2, 6–7^{(4–7)}, [10–3], against Mark Knowles and Daniel Nestor.

== Seeds ==
1. (The Bahamas) Mark Knowles / (Canada) Daniel Nestor (final)
2. (Israel) Jonathan Erlich / (Israel) Andy Ram (quarterfinals)
3. (India) Mahesh Bhupathi / (France) Fabrice Santoro (first round)
4. (Czech Republic) Martin Damm / (Czech Republic) Radek Štěpánek (champions)

== Draw ==
=== Key ===
- Q = Qualifier
- WC = Wild card
- LL = Lucky loser
- Alt = Alternate
- SE = Special exempt
- PR = Protected ranking
- ITF = ITF entry
- JE = Junior exempt
- w/o = Walkover
- r = Retired
- d = Defaulted
- SR = Special ranking

=== Draw ===
First round
1	(The Bahamas) M Knowles (Canada) D Nestor	7^{9}	6
(Spain) F López (Spain) F Verdasco	6^{7}	4
WC	(France) A Clément (France) S de Chaunac	3	6	[3]
(United States) T Dent (United Kingdom) G Rusedski	6	3	[10]
3	(India) M Bhupathi (France) F Santoro	6^{4}	7	[5]
(Austria) J Knowle (Austria) J Melzer	7^{7}	5	[10]
(Finland) J Nieminen (Czech Republic) P Pála	6	6
(Belgium) C Rochus (Belgium) O Rochus	2	3
(France) P-H Mathieu (France) G Monfils	6	3	[10]
WC	(France) D Guez (France) A Sidorenko	3	6	[6]
(Czech Republic) T Berdych (Czech Republic) C Suk	4	6^{4}
4	(Czech Republic) M Damm (Czech Republic) R Štěpánek	6	7^{7}
(France) R Gasquet (France) S Grosjean	3	6	[7]
(Germany) C Kas (Germany) P Petzschner	6	4	[10]
(Croatia) M Ančić (Croatia) I Ljubičić	6^{5}	6^{6}
2	(Israel) J Erlich (Israel) A Ram	7^{7}	7^{8}

Quarterfinals
1	(The Bahamas) M Knowles (Canada) D Nestor	6	7^{8}
(United States) T Dent (United Kingdom) G Rusedski	2	6^{6}
(Austria) J Knowle (Austria) J Melzer	6	6
(Finland) J Nieminen (Czech Republic) P Pála	4	4
(France) P-H Mathieu (France) G Monfils
4	(Czech Republic) M Damm (Czech Republic) R Štěpánek	w/o
(Germany) C Kas (Germany) P Petzschner	6	6
2	(Israel) J Erlich (Israel) A Ram	4	4

Semifinals
1	(The Bahamas) M Knowles (Canada) D Nestor	6	7
(Austria) J Knowle (Austria) J Melzer	3	5
4	(Czech Republic) M Damm (Czech Republic) R Štěpánek	6	6^{6}	[10]
(Germany) C Kas (Germany) P Petzschner	3	7^{8}	[6]

Final
1	(The Bahamas) M Knowles (Canada) D Nestor	2	7^{7}	[3]
4	(Czech Republic) M Damm (Czech Republic) R Štěpánek	6	6^{4}	[10]
