= 2005 Legg Mason Tennis Classic =

- Date: August 1–7
- Edition: 36th
- Category: International Series
- Draw: 64S / 16D
- Prize money: $575,000
- Surface: Hard / outdoor
- Location: Washington, D.C., United States
- Venue: William H.G. FitzGerald Tennis Center

Champions

Singles
- (United States) Andy Roddick

Doubles
- (United States) Bob Bryan / (United States) Mike Bryan
← 2004 ·	Washington Open	· 2006 →

The 2005 Legg Mason Tenis Classic was the 36th edition of this tennis tournament and was played on outdoor hard courts. The tournament was part of the International Series of the 2005 ATP Tour. It was held at the William H.G. FitzGerald Tennis Center in Washington, D.C. from August 1 through August 7, 2005.

== Finals ==
=== Singles ===
(United States) Andy Roddick defeated (United States) James Blake, 7–5, 6–3

- It was Roddick's 4th title of the year and the 19th of his career.

=== Doubles ===
(United States) Bob Bryan / (United States) Mike Bryan defeated (Zimbabwe) Wayne Black / (Zimbabwe) Kevin Ullyett, 6–4, 6–2
