= 2005 Legg Mason Tennis Classic – Singles =

Singles
- 2005 Legg Mason Tennis Classic

Final
- Champion: (United States) Andy Roddick
- Runner-up: (United States) James Blake
- Score: 7–5, 6–3

Details
- Draw: 48 (4Q / 4WC)
- Seeds: 16

Events
Singles	Doubles
← 2004 ·	Washington Open	· 2006 →

Lleyton Hewitt was the defending champion, but did not participate.

Andy Roddick won in the final 7–5, 6–3, against James Blake.

== Seeds ==
All seeds receive a bye into the second round.

1. (United States) Andy Roddick (champion)
2. (United States) Andre Agassi (withdrew)
3. (United Kingdom) Tim Henman (second round)
4. (Czech Republic) Radek Štěpánek (second round)
5. (Slovakia) Dominik Hrbatý (second round)
6. (Germany) Nicolas Kiefer (withdrew)
7. (Belarus) Max Mirnyi (second round)
8. (France) Sébastien Grosjean (third round)
9. (Chile) Nicolás Massú (second round)
10. (Czech Republic) Tomáš Berdych (semifinals)
11. (United Kingdom) Greg Rusedski (third round)
12. (Slovakia) Karol Beck (second round)
13. (Thailand) Paradorn Srichaphan (semifinals)
14. (Argentina) Juan Ignacio Chela (third round)
15. (Brazil) Ricardo Mello (second round)
16. (Czech Republic) Tomáš Zíb (third round)

== Draw ==
=== Key ===
- Q = Qualifier
- WC = Wild card
- LL = Lucky loser
- Alt = Alternate
- SE = Special exempt
- PR = Protected ranking
- ITF = ITF entry
- JE = Junior exempt
- w/o = Walkover
- r = Retired
- d = Defaulted
- SR = Special ranking

=== Finals ===
Quarterfinals
1	(United States) Andy Roddick	6^{7}	7	6
(Croatia) Ivo Karlović	7^{9}	5	4
13	(Thailand) Paradorn Srichaphan	6	7
(Peru) Luis Horna	4	5
(France) Arnaud Clément	3	2
(United States) James Blake	6	6
10	(Czech Republic) Tomáš Berdych	7^{7}	7^{11}
WC	(United States) Bobby Reynolds	6^{5}	6^{9}

Semifinals
1	(United States) Andy Roddick	7^{7}	6
13	(Thailand) Paradorn Srichaphan	6^{4}	2
(United States) James Blake	6	6
10	(Czech Republic) Tomáš Berdych	4	3

Final
1	(United States) Andy Roddick	7	6
(United States) James Blake	5	3

=== Top half ===
==== Section 1 ====
First round
(Ecuador) G Lapentti	6	6
(France) N Mahut	2	3
WC	(United States) B Baker	6	6
Q	(Switzerland) I Heuberger	2	4
(France) G Carraz	2	1
Q	(Australia) N Healey	6	6
(Denmark) K Carlsen	3	7^{7}	3
(Croatia) I Karlović	6	6^{5}	6

Second round
1	(United States) A Roddick	6	6
(Ecuador) G Lapentti	3	4
WC	(United States) B Baker	3	3
14	(Argentina) JI Chela	6	6
11	(United Kingdom) G Rusedski	7^{7}	6
Q	(Australia) N Healey	6^{2}	2
(Croatia) I Karlović	4	6	6
7	(Belarus) M Mirnyi	6	3	4

Third round
1	(United States) A Roddick	6	6^{4}	6
14	(Argentina) JI Chela	4	7^{7}	4
11	(United Kingdom) G Rusedski	6^{4}	2
(Croatia) I Karlović	7^{7}	6

Quarterfinals
1	(United States) A Roddick	6^{7}	7	6
(Croatia) I Karlović	7^{9}	5	4

==== Section 2 ====
First round
(South Africa) W Moodie	6	7^{7}
Q	(Australia) R Smeets	4	6^{4}
(Colombia) A Falla	2	3
(United States) P Goldstein	6	6
(United States) K Kim	2	3
(United States) R Ginepri	6	6
WC	(Australia) M Philippoussis	5	4
(Peru) L Horna	7	6

Second round
3	(United Kingdom) T Henman	6^{4}	5
(South Africa) W Moodie	7^{7}	7
(United States) P Goldstein	4	6	5
13	(Thailand) P Srichaphan	6	3	7
12	(Slovakia) K Beck	3	4
(United States) R Ginepri	6	6
(Peru) L Horna	6	6^{2}	7^{7}
5	(Slovakia) D Hrbatý	4	7^{7}	6^{4}

Third round
(South Africa) W Moodie	3	6^{1}
13	(Thailand) P Srichaphan	6	7^{7}
(United States) R Ginepri	4	6^{8}
(Peru) L Horna	6	7^{10}

Quarterfinals
13	(Thailand) P Srichaphan	6	7
(Peru) L Horna	4	5

=== Bottom half ===
==== Section 3 ====
First round
(Ecuador) N Lapentti	1	6	3
(France) A Clément	6	3	6
(Luxembourg) G Müller	6	6
(Italy) D Sanguinetti	3	4
(Sweden) J Björkman	6	6
(United States) J Morrison	3	4
(Monaco) J-R Lisnard	4	3
(United States) J Blake	6	6

Second round
LL	(United Kingdom) R Bloomfield	2	6	6^{7}
(France) A Clément	6	4	7^{9}
(Luxembourg) G Müller	7^{7}	6
9	(Chile) N Massú	6^{2}	4
16	(Czech Republic) T Zíb	0	6	7
(Sweden) J Björkman	6	3	5
(United States) J Blake	6	2	6
4	(Czech Republic) R Štěpánek	4	6	4

Third round
(France) A Clément	4	6	6
(Luxembourg) G Müller	6	3	4
16	(Czech Republic) T Zíb	4	6	4
(United States) J Blake	6	2	6

Quarterfinals
(France) A Clément	3	2
(United States) J Blake	6	6

==== Section 4 ====
First round
(Germany) A Popp	7^{7}	2	6
(Germany) B Phau	6^{4}	6	3
(Australia) W Arthurs	0	6	6
Q	(United States) P Simmonds	6	3	1
WC	(United States) B Reynolds	7	6
WC	(United States) A Clayton	5	4
(Czech Republic) J Hernych	6	6
LL	(United Kingdom) J Delgado	4	3

Second round
8	(France) S Grosjean	6	6
(Germany) A Popp	2	3
(Australia) W Arthurs	4	6	4
10	(Czech Republic) T Berdych	6	4	6
15	(Brazil) R Mello	3	6	5
WC	(United States) B Reynolds	6	3	7
(Czech Republic) J Hernych	7^{9}	6
LL	(France) S de Chaunac	6^{7}	1

Third round
8	(France) S Grosjean	5	2
10	(Czech Republic) T Berdych	7	6
WC	(United States) B Reynolds	2	6	6
(Czech Republic) J Hernych	6	4	3

Quarterfinals
10	(Czech Republic) T Berdych	7^{7}	7^{11}
WC	(United States) B Reynolds	6^{5}	6^{9}
