= 2006 If Stockholm Open – Singles =

Singles
- 2006 If Stockholm Open

Final
- Champion: (United States) James Blake
- Runner-up: (Finland) Jarkko Nieminen
- Score: 6–4, 6–2

Details
- Draw: 32
- Seeds: 8

Events
Singles	Doubles
- If Stockholm Open

James Blake was the defending champion and successfully retained his title, beating Jarkko Nieminen 6–4, 6–2 in the final.

== Seeds ==
1. (Spain) Rafael Nadal (second round)
2. (United States) James Blake (champion)
3. (Czech Republic) Tomáš Berdych (quarterfinals)
4. (Spain) David Ferrer (second round)
5. (Finland) Jarkko Nieminen (final)
6. (Belgium) Olivier Rochus (quarterfinals)
7. (Belgium) Kristof Vliegen (quarterfinals)
8. (Sweden) Robin Söderling (semifinals)

== Draw ==
Key

- Q = Qualifier
- WC = Wild card
- LL = Lucky loser
- Alt = Alternate
- ITF = ITF entry
- PR = Protected ranking
- SR = Special ranking
- SE = Special exempt
- JE = Junior exempt
- JR = Junior Accelerator Programme entrant
- CO = College Accelerator Programme entrant
- NG = Next Gen Accelerator Program entrant
- w/o = Walkover
- r = Retired
- d = Defaulted

=== Finals ===
Semifinals
WC	(Sweden) Joachim Johansson	6^{8}	7^{7}	3
5	(Finland) Jarkko Nieminen	7^{10}	6^{5}	6
8	(Sweden) Robin Söderling	5	6^{4}
2	(United States) James Blake	7	7^{7}

Final
5	(Finland) Jarkko Nieminen	4	2
2	(United States) James Blake	6	6

=== Top half ===
First round
1	(Spain) R Nadal	6	6
(Netherlands) R Sluiter	4	2
(Italy) D Sanguinetti	4	4
WC	(Sweden) J Johansson	6	6
(Canada) F Dancevic	6	6
(Spain) G García-López	4	1
(Chile) N Massú	2	4
7	(Belgium) K Vliegen	6	6
4	(Spain) D Ferrer	6	6
(Italy) A Seppi	1	4
(Spain) F López	2
(Argentina) J Mónaco	1^{r}
Q	(United Kingdom) J Marray	4	6^{3}
(France) M Gicquel	6	7^{7}
Q	(France) M Llodra	4	4
5	(Finland) J Nieminen	6	6

Second round
1	(Spain) R Nadal	4	6^{4}
WC	(Sweden) J Johansson	6	7^{7}
(Canada) F Dancevic	6	3	4
7	(Belgium) K Vliegen	3	6	6
4	(Spain) D Ferrer	6	3	2
(Spain) F López	3	6	6
(France) M Gicquel	3	2
5	(Finland) J Nieminen	6	6

Quarterfinals
WC	(Sweden) J Johansson	6^{5}	7^{7}	7^{9}
7	(Belgium) K Vliegen	7^{7}	6^{5}	6^{7}
(Spain) F López	3	5
5	(Finland) J Nieminen	6	7

Semifinals
WC	(Sweden) J Johansson	6^{8}	7^{7}	3
5	(Finland) J Nieminen	7^{10}	6^{5}	6

=== Bottom half ===
First round
8	(Sweden) R Söderling	6	6
(Belgium) C Rochus	1	2
Q	(Netherlands) P Wessels	5	2
(Sweden) J Björkman	7	6
WC	(Sweden) A Vinciguerra	6	6
Q	(France) N Devilder	4	1
(Germany) B Phau	3	2
3	(Czech Republic) T Berdych	6	6
6	(Belgium) O Rochus	6	6
(United States) V Spadea	3	4
(Thailand) P Srichaphan	7^{7}	3	6
(United States) M Fish	6^{5}	6	1
(Germany) S Greul	6	6
WC	(Sweden) E Eleskovic	4	2
(Sweden) T Johansson	3	2
2	(United States) J Blake	6	6

Second round
8	(Sweden) R Söderling	6	6
(Sweden) J Björkman	0	2
WC	(Sweden) A Vinciguerra	6	5	5
3	(Czech Republic) T Berdych	4	7	7
6	(Belgium) O Rochus	6	6^{5}	6
(Thailand) P Srichaphan	2	7^{7}	2
(Germany) S Greul	3	2
2	(United States) J Blake	6	6

Quarterfinals
8	(Sweden) R Söderling	6	6
3	(Czech Republic) T Berdych	2	3
6	(Belgium) O Rochus	7^{7}	4	2
2	(United States) J Blake	6^{3}	6	6

Semifinals
8	(Sweden) R Söderling	5	6^{4}
2	(United States) J Blake	7	7^{7}
