= 2006 Tennis Masters Cup – Doubles =

Doubles
- 2006 Tennis Masters Cup

Final
- Champions: (Sweden) Jonas Björkman (Belarus) Max Mirnyi
- Runners-up: (The Bahamas) Mark Knowles (Canada) Daniel Nestor
- Score: 6–2, 6–4

Details
- Draw: 8

Events
Singles	Doubles
- Tennis Masters Cup

Jonas Björkman and Max Mirnyi defeated Mark Knowles and Daniel Nestor in the final, 6–2, 6–4 to win the doubles tennis title at the 2006 Tennis Masters Cup.

Michaël Llodra and Fabrice Santoro were the reigning champions, but did not qualify as a team as they did not compete together in 2006. Llodra failed to qualify overall, while Santoro qualified with Nenad Zimonjić, but was eliminated in the round-robin stage.

== Seeds ==
1. (United States) Bob Bryan / (United States) Mike Bryan (round robin)
2. (Sweden) Jonas Björkman / (Belarus) Max Mirnyi (champions)
3. (The Bahamas) Mark Knowles / (Canada) Daniel Nestor (final)
4. (Australia) Paul Hanley / (Zimbabwe) Kevin Ullyett (semifinals)
5. (France) Fabrice Santoro / (Serbia) Nenad Zimonjić (round robin)
6. (Czech Republic) Martin Damm / (India) Leander Paes (semifinals)
7. (Israel) Jonathan Erlich / (Israel) Andy Ram (round robin)
8. (Poland) Mariusz Fyrstenberg / (Poland) Marcin Matkowski (round robin)

== Draw ==
Key

- Q = Qualifier
- WC = Wild card
- LL = Lucky loser
- Alt = Alternate
- ITF = ITF entry
- PR = Protected ranking
- SR = Special ranking
- SE = Special exempt
- JE = Junior exempt
- JR = Junior Accelerator Programme entrant
- CO = College Accelerator Programme entrant
- NG = Next Gen Accelerator Program entrant
- w/o = Walkover
- r = Retired
- d = Defaulted

=== Finals ===
Semifinals
4	(Australia) Paul Hanley (Zimbabwe) Kevin Ullyett	6	1	3
3	(The Bahamas) Mark Knowles (Canada) Daniel Nestor	4	6	6
2	(Sweden) Jonas Björkman (Belarus) Max Mirnyi	6^{4}	7^{7}	7^{7}
6	(Czech Republic) Martin Damm (India) Leander Paes	7^{7}	6^{4}	6^{5}

Final
3	(The Bahamas) Mark Knowles (Canada) Daniel Nestor	2	4
2	(Sweden) Jonas Björkman (Belarus) Max Mirnyi	6	6

=== Red group ===
		(United States) Bryan (United States) Bryan	(Australia) Hanley (Zimbabwe) Ullyett	(Czech Republic) Damm (India) Paes	(Israel) Erlich (Israel) Ram	RR; W–L	Set; W–L	Game; W–L	Standings
1	(United States) Bob Bryan (United States) Mike Bryan		6–3, 6–7^{(4–7)}, 4–6	6–2, 6–7^{(4–7)}, 7–6^{(7–5)}	6–7^{(2–7)}, 6–2, 1–6	1–2	4–5	48–46	4
4	(Australia) Paul Hanley (Zimbabwe) Kevin Ullyett	3–6, 7–6^{(7–4)}, 6–4		7–6^{(8–6)}, 4–6, 6–3	6–4, 6–4	3–0	6–2	45–39	1
6	(Czech Republic) Martin Damm (India) Leander Paes	2–6, 7–6^{(7–4)}, 6–7^{(5–7)}	6–7^{(6–8)}, 6–4, 3–6		6–4, 7–6^{(8–6)}	1–2	4–4	43–46	2
7	(Israel) Jonathan Erlich (Israel) Andy Ram	7–6^{(7–2)}, 2–6, 6–1	4–6, 4–6	4–6, 6–7^{(6–8)}		1–2	2–5	33–38	3

Standings are determined by: 1. number of wins; 2. number of matches; 3. in two-players-ties, head-to-head records; 4. in three-players-ties, percentage of sets won, or of games won; 5. steering-committee decision.

=== Gold group ===
		(Sweden) Björkman (Belarus) Mirnyi	(The Bahamas) Knowles (Canada) Nestor	(France) Santoro (Serbia) Zimonjić	(Poland) Frystenberg (Poland) Matkowski	RR; W–L	Set; W–L	Game; W–L	Standings
2	(Sweden) Jonas Björkman (Belarus) Max Mirnyi		4–6, 6–4, 7–6^{(7–2)}	6–3, 7–6^{(9–7)}	6–3, 6–4	3–0	6–1	42–32	1
3	(The Bahamas) Mark Knowles (Canada) Daniel Nestor	6–4, 4–6, 6–7^{(2–7)}		6–3, 6–2	6–3, 6–3	2–1	5–2	40–28	2
5	(France) Fabrice Santoro (Serbia) Nenad Zimonjić	3–6, 6–7^{(7–9)}	3–6, 2–6		6–3, 6–7^{(4–7)}, 6–3	1–2	2–5	32–38	3
8	(Poland) Mariusz Fyrstenberg (Poland) Marcin Matkowski	3–6, 4–6	3–6, 3–6	3–6, 7–6^{(7–4)}, 3–6		0–3	1–6	26–42	4

Standings are determined by: 1. number of wins; 2. number of matches; 3. in two-players-ties, head-to-head records; 4. in three-players-ties, percentage of sets won, or of games won; 5. steering-committee decision.
