= 2006 Open 13 – Singles =

Singles
- 2006 Open 13

Final
- Champion: (France) Arnaud Clément
- Runner-up: (Croatia) Mario Ančić
- Score: 7–5, 6–4

Details
- Draw: 32 (4 Q / 2 WC )
- Seeds: 8

Events
Singles	Doubles
← 2005 ·	Open 13	· 2007 →

Arnaud Clément defeated Mario Ančić 7–5, 6–4 to win the 2006 Open 13 singles competition. Joachim Johansson was the champion but did not defend his title.

== Seeds ==
1. (Spain) Rafael Nadal (semifinals)
2. (Croatia) Ivan Ljubičić (quarterfinals)
3. (Russia) Nikolay Davydenko (second round)
4. (Sweden) Thomas Johansson (first round)
5. (France) Richard Gasquet (first round)
6. (Croatia) Mario Ančić (final)
7. (Czech Republic) Radek Štěpánek (second round)
8. (France) Sébastien Grosjean (semifinals)

== Draw ==
=== Key ===
- Q = Qualifier
- WC = Wild card
- LL = Lucky loser
- Alt = Alternate
- SE = Special exempt
- PR = Protected ranking
- ITF = ITF entry
- JE = Junior exempt
- w/o = Walkover
- r = Retired
- d = Defaulted
- SR = Special ranking

=== Finals ===
Semifinals
1	(Spain) Rafael Nadal	6	3	5
WC	(France) Arnaud Clément	2	6	7
8	(France) Sébastien Grosjean	3	6	3
6	(Croatia) Mario Ančić	6	3	6

Final
WC	(France) Arnaud Clément	6	6
6	(Croatia) Mario Ančić	4	2

=== Top half ===
First round
1	(Spain) R Nadal	4	6	7
(Belgium) O Rochus	6	2	5
WC	(France) G Simon	4	6	6
(Finland) J Nieminen	6	3	2
(France) P-H Mathieu	5	6	6
Q	(France) J Haehnel	7	3	4
(Czech Republic) T Berdych	5	4
7	(Czech Republic) R Štěpánek	7	6
4	(Sweden) T Johansson	4	6^{3}
(France) F Santoro	6	7^{7}
Q	(France) N Thomann	3	2
(United Kingdom) G Rusedski	6	6
(Austria) J Melzer	4	6^{3}
(Spain) F Verdasco	6	7^{7}
WC	(France) A Clément	3	6	6
5	(France) R Gasquet	6	4	0

Second round
1	(Spain) R Nadal	7	6
WC	(France) G Simon	5	4
(France) P-H Mathieu	7^{7}	6
7	(Czech Republic) R Štěpánek	6^{0}	3
(France) F Santoro	6	6
(United Kingdom) G Rusedski	3	2
(Spain) F Verdasco	6^{5}	3
WC	(France) A Clément	7^{7}	6

Quarterfinals
1	(Spain) R Nadal	7	6
(France) P-H Mathieu	5	4
(France) F Santoro	5	6	6^{5}
WC	(France) A Clément	7	4	7^{7}

Semifinals
1	(Spain) R Nadal	6	3	5
WC	(France) A Clément	2	6	7

=== Bottom half ===
First round
8	(France) S Grosjean	2	7	6
(France) G Monfils	6	5	3
Q	(France) S de Chaunac	4	3
(Russia) M Youzhny	6	6
LL	(Russia) E Korolev	2	6	6
Q	(France) A Sidorenko	6	4	1
(Belgium) C Rochus	1	2
3	(Russia) N Davydenko	6	6
6	(Croatia) M Ančić	6	6^{9}	6
(Cyprus) M Baghdatis	2	7^{11}	4
Q	(France) J-C Faurel	6	6
(Spain) F López	3	3
(United States) T Dent	6	3	6^{0}
(Russia) I Andreev	2	6	7^{7}
(Thailand) P Srichaphan	3	7^{8}	3
2	(Croatia) I Ljubičić	6	6^{6}	6

Second round
8	(France) S Grosjean	6	6
(Russia) M Youzhny	3	1
LL	(Russia) E Korolev	6	7^{8}
3	(Russia) N Davydenko	4	6^{6}
6	(Croatia) M Ančić	6	6
Q	(France) J-C Faurel	3	3
(Russia) I Andreev	6^{5}	4
2	(Croatia) I Ljubičić	7^{7}	6

Quarterfinals
8	(France) S Grosjean	7^{7}	6
LL	(Russia) E Korolev	6^{4}	3
6	(Croatia) M Ančić	7^{7}	3	6
2	(Croatia) I Ljubičić	6^{2}	6	3

Semifinals
8	(France) S Grosjean	3	6	3
6	(Croatia) M Ančić	6	3	6
