= 2006 Legg Mason Tennis Classic – Singles =

Singles
- 2006 Legg Mason Tennis Classic

Final
- Champion: (France) Arnaud Clément
- Runner-up: (United Kingdom) Andy Murray
- Score: 7–6^{(7–3)}, 6–2

Details
- Draw: 48 (4Q / 4WC)
- Seeds: 16

Events
Singles	Doubles
← 2005 ·	Washington Open	· 2007 →

Andy Roddick was the defending champion, but withdrew due to an Abdominal strain.

Arnaud Clément won in the final 7–6^{(7–3)}, 6–2, against Andy Murray.

== Seeds ==
All seeds receive a bye into the second round.

1. (United States) James Blake (third round)
2. (United States) Andy Roddick (withdrew because of an abdominal strain)
3. (Australia) Lleyton Hewitt (quarterfinals)
4. (United States) Andre Agassi (second round)
5. (Slovakia) Dominik Hrbatý (third round)
6. (France) Sébastien Grosjean (second round)
7. (Russia) Dmitry Tursunov (semifinals)
8. (United Kingdom) Andy Murray (final)
9. (Thailand) Paradorn Srichaphan (second round)
10. (France) Julien Benneteau (second round)
11. (France) Arnaud Clément (champion)
12. (Spain) Feliciano López (third round)
13. (Germany) Björn Phau (second round)
14. (United Kingdom) Tim Henman (quarterfinals)
15. (France) Nicolas Mahut (second round)
16. (United States) Mardy Fish (quarterfinals)

== Draw ==
=== Key ===
- Q = Qualifier
- WC = Wild card
- LL = Lucky loser
- Alt = Alternate
- ITF = ITF entry
- PR = Protected ranking
- SR = Special ranking
- SE = Special exempt
- JE = Junior exempt
- JR = Junior Accelerator Programme entrant
- CO = College Accelerator Programme entrant
- NG = Next Gen Accelerator Program entrant
- w/o = Walkover
- r = Retired
- d = Defaulted

=== Finals ===
Quarterfinals
(Russia) Marat Safin	7^{7}	7^{11}
(South Africa) Wesley Moodie	6^{5}	6^{9}
3	(Australia) Lleyton Hewitt	6^{1}	4
11	(France) Arnaud Clément	7^{7}	6
8	(United Kingdom) Andy Murray	6	6
16	(United States) Mardy Fish	2	4
7	(Russia) Dmitry Tursunov	6	6
14	(United Kingdom) Tim Henman	3	2

Semifinals
(Russia) Marat Safin	6^{5}	6^{4}
11	(France) Arnaud Clément	7^{7}	7^{7}
8	(United Kingdom) Andy Murray	6	7
7	(Russia) Dmitry Tursunov	2	5

Final
11	(France) Arnaud Clément	7^{7}	6
8	(United Kingdom) Andy Murray	6^{3}	2

=== Top half ===
==== Section 1 ====
First round
WC	(United States) S Oudsema	1	3
(United States) K Kim	6	6
(Russia) M Safin	6	7^{8}
(Russia) I Kunitsyn	3	6^{6}
(Thailand) D Udomchoke	1	2
(Denmark) K Carlsen	6	6
WC	(United States) S Querrey	6	6^{4}	6^{6}
(South Africa) W Moodie	2	7^{7}	7^{8}

Second round
1	(United States) J Blake	7	3	6
(United States) K Kim	5	6	2
(Russia) M Safin	6	5	6
15	(France) N Mahut	3	7	4
9	(Thailand) P Srichaphan	6	6^{6}	3
(Denmark) K Carlsen	4	7^{8}	6
(South Africa) W Moodie	6	3	6
6	(France) S Grosjean	4	6	3

Third round
1	(United States) J Blake	6^{6}	6^{5}
(Russia) M Safin	7^{8}	7^{7}
(Denmark) K Carlsen	3	7^{7}	6^{6}
(South Africa) W Moodie	6	6^{5}	7^{8}

Quarterfinals
(Russia) M Safin	7^{7}	7^{11}
(South Africa) W Moodie	6^{5}	6^{9}

==== Section 2 ====
First round
(Croatia) R Karanušić	5	0^{r}
(United States) V Spadea	7	1
Q	(South Africa) W Whitehouse	2	2
(Germany) D Gremelmayr	6	6
Q	(United States) R Sweeting	7^{9}	6
(United States) J Gimelstob	6^{7}	2
(Luxembourg) G Müller	3	7^{9}	4
(Chile) P Capdeville	6	6^{7}	0^{r}

Second round
3	(Australia) L Hewitt	6^{3}	7^{7}	6
(United States) V Spadea	7^{7}	6^{5}	4
(Germany) D Gremelmayr	6	6
13	(Germany) B Phau	4	3
11	(France) A Clément	6	6
Q	(United States) R Sweeting	2	1
(Luxembourg) G Müller	6	4	3
5	(Slovakia) D Hrbatý	4	6	6

Third round
3	(Australia) L Hewitt	6	6
(Germany) D Gremelmayr	1	4
11	(France) A Clément	6	6
5	(Slovakia) D Hrbatý	3	2

Quarterfinals
3	(Australia) L Hewitt	6^{1}	4
11	(France) A Clément	7^{7}	6

=== Bottom half ===
==== Section 3 ====
First round
(Paraguay) R Delgado	6	6
(Australia) P Luczak	4	4
(France) J-C Faurel	3	3
(Russia) T Gabashvili	6	6
(Monaco) J-R Lisnard	5	4
(Czech Republic) T Zíb	7	6
Q	(Italy) A Stoppini	6	6
(United States) P Goldstein	3	2

Second round
8	(United Kingdom) A Murray	6	6
(Paraguay) R Delgado	4	3
(Russia) T Gabashvili	4	4
12	(Spain) F López	6	6
16	(United States) M Fish	6	6
(Czech Republic) T Zíb	4	4
Q	(Italy) A Stoppini	6	6
4	(United States) A Agassi	4	3

Third round
8	(United Kingdom) A Murray	7	6
12	(Spain) F López	5	2
16	(United States) M Fish	6	6
Q	(Italy) A Stoppini	3	1

Quarterfinals
8	(United Kingdom) A Murray	6	6
16	(United States) M Fish	2	4

==== Section 4 ====
First round
(Argentina) E Massa	6	6
WC	(India) S Devvarman	4	0
(Canada) F Dancevic	6	3	2
(South Korea) H-t Lee	2	6	6
Q	(United States) P King	7^{7}	3	6
(United States) B Reynolds	6^{5}	6	3
WC	(United States) M Venus	2	1
(Serbia) J Tipsarević	6	6

Second round
7	(Russia) D Tursunov	3	6	3
(Argentina) E Massa	6	1	3^{r}
(South Korea) H-t Lee	6	6
10	(France) J Benneteau	3	4
14	(United Kingdom) T Henman	6^{3}	6	7
Q	(United States) P King	7^{7}	3	5
(Serbia) J Tipsarević	6	3	0
LL	(United States) J-M Gambill	2	6	6

Third round
7	(Russia) D Tursunov	6^{10}	7	6
(South Korea) H-t Lee	7^{12}	5	3
14	(United Kingdom) T Henman	6	6
LL	(United States) J-M Gambill	1	3

Quarterfinals
7	(Russia) D Tursunov	6	6
14	(United Kingdom) T Henman	3	2
