= 2006 Stella Artois Championships – Singles =

Singles
- 2006 Queen's Club Championships

Final
- Champion: (Australia) Lleyton Hewitt
- Runner-up: (United States) James Blake
- Score: 6–4, 6–4

Details
- Draw: 56
- Seeds: 16

Events
Singles	Doubles
- Queen's Club Championships

Andy Roddick was the three-time defending champion but lost in the semifinals to James Blake.

Lleyton Hewitt won in the final 6–4, 6–4 against Blake, to win his fourth Stella Artois Championship.

== Seeds ==
The top eight seeds receive a bye into the second round.

1. (Spain) Rafael Nadal (quarterfinals)
2. (Croatia) Ivan Ljubičić (third round)
3. (United States) Andy Roddick (semifinals)
4. (Russia) Nikolay Davydenko (second round)
5. (United States) James Blake (final)
6. (Chile) Fernando González (quarterfinals)
7. (Czech Republic) Radek Štěpánek (second round)
8. (Australia) Lleyton Hewitt (champion)
9. (United States) Robby Ginepri (third round)
10. (Sweden) Thomas Johansson (first round)
11. (France) Sébastien Grosjean (second round)
12. (United States) Andre Agassi (first round)
13. (France) Gaël Monfils (quarterfinals)
14. (France) Paul-Henri Mathieu (first round)
15. (Russia) Dmitry Tursunov (quarterfinals)
16. (Thailand) Paradorn Schrichapan (third round)

== Draw ==
Key

- Q = Qualifier
- WC = Wild card
- LL = Lucky loser
- Alt = Alternate
- ITF = ITF entry
- PR = Protected ranking
- SR = Special ranking
- SE = Special exempt
- JE = Junior exempt
- JR = Junior Accelerator Programme entrant
- CO = College Accelerator Programme entrant
- NG = Next Gen Accelerator Program entrant
- w/o = Walkover
- r = Retired
- d = Defaulted

=== Finals ===
Quarterfinals
1	(Spain) Rafael Nadal	6	3	0^{r}
8	(Australia) Lleyton Hewitt	3	6	0
15	(Russia) Dmitry Tursunov	3	6^{1}
(United Kingdom) Tim Henman	6	7^{7}
6	(Chile) Fernando González	4	3
3	(United States) Andy Roddick	6	6
5	(United States) James Blake	6	0
13	(France) Gaël Monfils	1	0^{r}

Semifinals
8	(Australia) Lleyton Hewitt	6	3	6
(United Kingdom) Tim Henman	3	6	2
3	(United States) Andy Roddick	5	4
5	(United States) James Blake	7	6

Final
8	(Australia) Lleyton Hewitt	6	6
5	(United States) James Blake	4	4

=== Top half ===
==== Section 1 ====
First round
WC	(United Kingdom) J Baker	1	3
WC	(United States) M Fish	6	6
(Germany) S Greul	3	3
Q	(Spain) F Verdasco	6	6
(South Korea) H-T Lee	7^{7}	6^{3}	6
14	(France) P-H Mathieu	6^{4}	7^{7}	4
10	(Sweden) T Johansson	6^{6}	6	6^{4}
(Belarus) M Mirnyi	7^{8}	3	7^{7}
WC	(Spain) F López	1	6^{4}
(Italy) D Bracciali	6	7^{7}
Q	(United Kingdom) M Lee	3	2
(Spain) F Vicente	6	6

Second round
1	(Spain) R Nadal	7^{7}	6
WC	(United States) M Fish	6^{1}	1
Q	(Spain) F Verdasco	6	5	6
(South Korea) H-T Lee	2	7	4
(Belarus) M Mirnyi	6	6
(Italy) D Bracciali	1	3
(Spain) F Vicente	6	4	2
8	(Australia) L Hewitt	4	6	6

Third round
1	(Spain) R Nadal	2	7^{7}	7^{7}
Q	(Spain) F Verdasco	6	6^{3}	6^{3}
(Belarus) M Mirnyi	6	1	6^{4}
8	(Australia) L Hewitt	4	6	7^{7}

Quarterfinals
1	(Spain) R Nadal	6	3	0^{r}
8	(Australia) L Hewitt	3	6	0

==== Section 2 ====
First round
(Taiwan) Y-T Wang	6	6
(Sweden) J Björkman	3	3
(Thailand) D Udomchoke	3	7	6
(Czech Republic) T Zíb	6	5	0
WC	(United Kingdom) A Bogdanović	6^{4}	4
15	(Russia) D Tursunov	7^{7}	6
12	(United States) A Agassi	4	4
(United Kingdom) T Henman	6	6
(Paraguay) R Delgado	6	7^{7}
(Czech Republic) L Dlouhý	4	6^{3}
(France) J Benneteau	4	1
(France) N Mahut	6	6

Second round
4	(Russia) N Davydenko	6	3	1
(Taiwan) Y-T Wang	2	6	6
(Thailand) D Udomchoke	3	6	2
15	(Russia) D Tursunov	6	2	6
(United Kingdom) T Henman	6	6
(Paraguay) R Delgado	2	4
(France) N Mahut	6	4	6
7	(Czech Republic) R Štěpánek	4	6	2

Third round
(Taiwan) Y-T Wang	3	6	1
15	(Russia) D Tursunov	6	3	6
(United Kingdom) T Henman	6	6
(France) N Mahut	3	4

Quarterfinals
15	(Russia) D Tursunov	3	6^{1}
(United Kingdom) T Henman	6	7^{7}

=== Bottom half ===
==== Section 3 ====
First round
(United Kingdom) G Rusedski	7	3	2^{r}
Q	(France) A Dupuis	5	6	3
(South Africa) W Moodie	3	4
WC	(Australia) M Philippoussis	6	6
(Czech Republic) I Minář	3	6^{4}
11	(France) S Grosjean	6	7^{7}
16	(Thailand) P Srichaphan	6	7^{7}
(Belgium) D Norman	4	6^{5}
(Taiwan) Y-H Lu	6	7^{9}
(Luxembourg) G Müller	4	6^{7}
Q	(Canada) F Dancevic	4	6	6
(Denmark) K Carlsen	6	3	3

Second round
6	(Chile) F González	7^{7}	7^{7}
Q	(France) A Dupuis	6^{5}	6^{2}
WC	(Australia) M Philippoussis	7^{7}	4	6
11	(France) S Grosjean	6^{5}	6	3
16	(Thailand) P Srichaphan	6	5	6
(Taiwan) Y-H Lu	3	7	4
Q	(Canada) F Dancevic	6	4	3
3	(United States) A Roddick	2	6	6

Third round
6	(Chile) F González	6	3	6
WC	(Australia) M Philippoussis	2	6	3
16	(Thailand) P Srichaphan	6^{5}	3
3	(United States) A Roddick	7^{7}	6

Quarterfinals
6	(Chile) F González	4	3
3	(United States) A Roddick	6	6

==== Section 4 ====
First round
(United States) J Gimelstob	7^{9}	6
(Netherlands) R Sluiter	6^{7}	2
(United Kingdom) A Murray	6^{3}	6	2
(Serbia) J Tipsarević	7^{7}	3	6
(United States) P Goldstein	6	5	1
9	(United States) R Ginepri	3	7	6
13	(France) G Monfils	7^{7}	7^{7}
(Austria) J Melzer	6^{2}	6^{2}
(Russia) I Kunitsyn	4	4
(United States) B Reynolds	6	6
(Romania) R Sabău	6	6
(Czech Republic) R Vik	3	3

Second round
5	(United States) J Blake	7	6
(United States) J Gimelstob	5	1
(Serbia) J Tipsarević	6^{4}	4
9	(United States) R Ginepri	7^{7}	6
13	(France) G Monfils	6	6
(United States) B Reynolds	1	2
(Romania) R Sabău	6^{6}	2
2	(Croatia) I Ljubičić	7^{8}	6

Third round
5	(United States) J Blake	6	3	6
9	(United States) R Ginepri	3	6	3
13	(France) G Monfils	7^{13}	7
2	(Croatia) I Ljubičić	6^{11}	5

Quarterfinals
5	(United States) J Blake	6	0
13	(France) G Monfils	1	0^{r}
