= 2006 If Stockholm Open – Doubles =

Doubles
- 2006 If Stockholm Open

Final
- Champions: (Australia) Paul Hanley (Zimbabwe) Kevin Ullyett
- Runners-up: (Belgium) Olivier Rochus (Belgium) Kristof Vliegen
- Score: 7–6^{(7–2)}, 6–4

Events
Singles	Doubles
← 2005 ·	If Stockholm Open	· 2007 →

Wayne Arthurs and Paul Hanley were the defending champions. Arthurs partnered with Michaël Llodra this year, losing in the first round. Hanley partnered with Kevin Ullyett, winning the title again.

Hanley and Ullyett won in the final 7–6^{(7–2)}, 6–4, against Olivier Rochus and Kristof Vliegen.

== Seeds ==
1. (The Bahamas) Mark Knowles / (Canada) Daniel Nestor (first round)
2. (Australia) Paul Hanley / (Zimbabwe) Kevin Ullyett (champions)
3. (Sweden) Simon Aspelin / (Australia) Todd Perry (semifinals)
4. (Australia) Ashley Fisher / (United States) Tripp Phillips (quarterfinals)

== Draw ==
=== Key ===
- Q = Qualifier
- WC = Wild card
- LL = Lucky loser
- Alt = Alternate
- SE = Special exempt
- PR = Protected ranking
- ITF = ITF entry
- JE = Junior exempt
- w/o = Walkover
- r = Retired
- d = Defaulted
- SR = Special ranking

=== Draw ===
First round
1	(The Bahamas) M Knowles (Canada) D Nestor	4	6	[5]
(Germany) C Kas (Germany) P Petzschner	6	4	[10]
(India) M Bhupathi (United States) J Blake	4	6	[7]
(Belgium) O Rochus (Belgium) K Vliegen	6	4	[10]
4	(Australia) A Fisher (United States) T Phillips	6	2	[10]
(Australia) W Arthurs (France) M Llodra	4	6	[4]
(Austria) A Peya (Germany) B Phau	4	1
(Sweden) R Lindstedt (Finland) J Nieminen	6	6
WC	(Sweden) J Björkman (United States) J McEnroe	6	6
Alt	(Sweden) J Landsberg (Sweden) A Vinciguerra	3	2
WC	(Sweden) E Eleskovic (Sweden) M Ryderstedt	4	0
3	(Sweden) S Aspelin (Australia) T Perry	6	6
(Australia) S Huss (United States) J Thomas	4	6	[10]
(Chile) N Massú (Belgium) C Rochus	6	3	[5]
(United Kingdom) J Auckland (Germany) S Greul	6^{7}	4
2	(Australia) P Hanley (Zimbabwe) K Ullyett	7^{9}	6

Quarterfinals
(Germany) C Kas (Germany) P Petzschner	7	6^{4}	[6]
(Belgium) O Rochus (Belgium) K Vliegen	5	7^{7}	[10]
4	(Australia) A Fisher (United States) T Phillips	5	3
(Sweden) R Lindstedt (Finland) J Nieminen	7	6
WC	(Sweden) J Björkman (United States) J McEnroe	6^{6}	6^{2}
3	(Sweden) S Aspelin (Australia) T Perry	7^{8}	7^{7}
(Australia) S Huss (United States) J Thomas	6^{4}	1
2	(Australia) P Hanley (Zimbabwe) K Ullyett	7^{7}	6

Semifinals
(Belgium) O Rochus (Belgium) K Vliegen	2	6	[10]
(Sweden) R Lindstedt (Finland) J Nieminen	6	1	[8]
3	(Sweden) S Aspelin (Australia) T Perry	6	4	[10]
2	(Australia) P Hanley (Zimbabwe) K Ullyett	3	6	[12]

Final
(Belgium) O Rochus (Belgium) K Vliegen	6^{2}	4
2	(Australia) P Hanley (Zimbabwe) K Ullyett	7^{7}	6
