= 2006 Italian Open – Men's doubles =

Men's doubles
- 2006 Italian Open

Final
- Champions: (The Bahamas) Mark Knowles (Canada) Daniel Nestor
- Runners-up: (Israel) Jonathan Erlich (Israel) Andy Ram
- Score: 6–4, 5–7, [13–11]

Events
Singles	men	women
Doubles	men	women
← 2005 ·	Italian Open	· 2007 →

Michaël Llodra and Fabrice Santoro were the defending champions, but had different outcomes. While Llodra did not compete this year, Santoro partnered with Nenad Zimonjić and reached the Quarterfinals, before losing to Jonas Björkman and Max Mirnyi.

Mark Knowles and Daniel Nestor won the title, defeating Jonathan Erlich and Andy Ram 6–4, 5–7, [13–11] in the final. It was the 4th title of the year for the pair, and the 43rd title for Knowles and 45th title for Nestor, in their respective careers.

== Seeds ==
All seeds received a bye into the second round.

1. (United States) Bob Bryan / (United States) Mike Bryan (quarterfinals)
2. (Sweden) Jonas Björkman / (Belarus) Max Mirnyi (semifinals)
3. (The Bahamas) Mark Knowles / (Canada) Daniel Nestor (champions)
4. (Australia) Paul Hanley / (Zimbabwe) Kevin Ullyett (quarterfinals)
5. (France) Fabrice Santoro / (Serbia and Montenegro) Nenad Zimonjić (quarterfinals)
6. (Israel) Jonathan Erlich / (Israel) Andy Ram (final)
7. (Sweden) Simon Aspelin / (Australia) Todd Perry (quarterfinals)
8. (India) Mahesh Bhupathi / (South Africa) Wesley Moodie (second round)

== Draw ==
=== Key ===
- Q = Qualifier
- WC = Wild card
- LL = Lucky loser
- Alt = Alternate
- SE = Special exempt
- PR = Protected ranking
- ITF = ITF entry
- JE = Junior exempt
- w/o = Walkover
- r = Retired
- d = Defaulted
- SR = Special ranking

=== Finals ===
Semifinals
(Chile) Fernando González (Chile) Nicolás Massú	3	7	[5]
6	(Israel) Jonathan Erlich (Israel) Andy Ram	6	5	[10]
3	(The Bahamas) Mark Knowles (Canada) Daniel Nestor	6	7^{7}
2	(Sweden) Jonas Björkman (Belarus) Max Mirnyi	3	6^{5}

Final
6	(Israel) Jonathan Erlich (Israel) Andy Ram	4	7	[11]
3	(The Bahamas) Mark Knowles (Canada) Daniel Nestor	6	5	[13]

=== Top half ===
First round
(India) L Paes (Czech Republic) R Štěpánek	7	6
(Russia) M Safin (Russia) D Tursunov	5	3
(Chile) F González (Chile) N Massú	6^{6}	7^{7}	[10]
WC	(Italy) D Bracciali (Italy) G Galimberti	7^{8}	6^{4}	[6]
(United States) J Blake (Belgium) X Malisse	6	6^{4}	[10]
(United States) R Ginepri (United States) A Roddick	3	7^{7}	[8]
(Finland) J Nieminen (Belgium) O Rochus	7	3	[10]
(Russia) N Davydenko (Slovakia) D Hrbatý	5	6	[4]

Second round
1	(United States) B Bryan (United States) M Bryan	6	7
(India) L Paes (Czech Republic) R Štěpánek	1	5
(Chile) F González (Chile) N Massú	6	6
8	(India) M Bhupathi (South Africa) W Moodie	3	2
4	(Australia) P Hanley (Zimbabwe) K Ullyett	6	6
(United States) J Blake (Belgium) X Malisse	3	1
(Finland) J Nieminen (Belgium) O Rochus	4	3
6	(Israel) J Erlich (Israel) A Ram	6	6

Quarterfinals
1	(United States) B Bryan (United States) M Bryan	6	2	[4]
(Chile) F González (Chile) N Massú	3	6	[10]
4	(Australia) P Hanley (Zimbabwe) K Ullyett	1	4
6	(Israel) J Erlich (Israel) A Ram	6	6

Semifinals
(Chile) F González (Chile) N Massú	3	7	[5]
6	(Israel) J Erlich (Israel) A Ram	6	5	[10]

=== Bottom half ===
First round
(Czech Republic) T Berdych (Czech Republic) L Friedl	7^{8}	6
(Argentina) G Coria (Argentina) M García	6^{6}	2
WC	(Italy) S Bolelli (Italy) A Seppi	3	4
(Austria) J Knowle (Argentina) S Prieto	6	6
Alt	(Argentina) J Acasuso (Argentina) JI Chela	6^{7}	7	[2]
(Poland) M Fyrstenberg (Poland) M Matkowski	7^{9}	5	[10]
(Australia) S Huss (Czech Republic) C Suk	2	6	[7]
(France) S Grosjean (Thailand) P Srichaphan	6	2	[10]

Second round
7	(Sweden) S Aspelin (Australia) T Perry	6	7
(Czech Republic) T Berdych (Czech Republic) L Friedl	4	5
(Austria) J Knowle (Argentina) S Prieto	6^{5}	5
3	(The Bahamas) M Knowles (Canada) D Nestor	7^{7}	7
5	(France) F Santoro (Serbia and Montenegro) N Zimonjić	4	6	[10]
(Poland) M Fyrstenberg (Poland) M Matkowski	6	4	[6]
(France) S Grosjean (Thailand) P Srichaphan	3	3
2	(Sweden) J Björkman (Belarus) M Mirnyi	6	6

Quarterfinals
7	(Sweden) S Aspelin (Australia) T Perry	1	5
3	(The Bahamas) M Knowles (Canada) D Nestor	6	7
5	(France) F Santoro (Serbia and Montenegro) N Zimonjić	2	6^{7}
2	(Sweden) J Björkman (Belarus) M Mirnyi	6	7^{9}

Semifinals
3	(The Bahamas) M Knowles (Canada) D Nestor	6	7^{7}
2	(Sweden) J Björkman (Belarus) M Mirnyi	3	6^{5}
