= 2006 Stella Artois Championships =

- Date: 12–18 June
- Edition: 104th
- Category: International Series
- Draw: 56S / 24D
- Prize money: $775,000
- Surface: Grass / outdoor
- Location: London, United Kingdom
- Venue: Queen's Club

Champions

Singles
- (Australia) Lleyton Hewitt

Doubles
- (Australia) Paul Hanley / (Zimbabwe) Kevin Ullyett
← 2005 ·	Queen's Club Championships	· 2007 →

The 2006 Stella Artois Championships, also known as the Queen's Club Championships, was a men's tennis tournament that was part of the International Series of the 2006 ATP Tour. It was the 104th edition of the event and was held on outdoor grass courts at the Queen's Club in London, United Kingdom, from 12 June until 18 June 2006. Lleyton Hewitt won the singles title, his fourth win at the event after 2000, 2001 and 2002.

== Finals ==
=== Singles ===
(Australia) Lleyton Hewitt defeated (United States) James Blake, 6–4, 6–4

- It was Hewitt's only singles title of the year and the 25th of his career.

=== Doubles ===
(Australia) Paul Hanley / (Zimbabwe) Kevin Ullyett defeated (Sweden) Jonas Björkman / (Belarus) Max Mirnyi, 6–4, 3–6, [10–8]
