= 2006 NASDAQ-100 Open – Women's doubles =

Women's doubles
- 2006 NASDAQ-100 Open

Final
- Champions: (United States) Lisa Raymond (Australia) Samantha Stosur
- Runners-up: (South Africa) Liezel Huber (United States) Martina Navratilova
- Score: 6–4, 7–5

Details
- Draw: 32 (3WC/1Q/1LL)
- Seeds: 8

Events
Singles	men	women
Doubles	men	women
- Miami Open

The doubles Tournament at the 2006 NASDAQ-100 Open took place between March 20 and April 6 on the outdoor hard courts of the Tennis Center at Crandon Park in Key Biscayne, United States. Lisa Raymond and Samantha Stosur won the title, defeating Liezel Huber and Martina Navratilova in the final.

== Seeds ==
1. (United States) Lisa Raymond / (Australia) Samantha Stosur (champions)
2. (Zimbabwe) Cara Black / (Australia) Rennae Stubbs (first round)
3. (Germany) Anna-Lena Grönefeld / (United States) Meghann Shaughnessy (first round)
4. (Russia) Elena Likhovtseva / (Russia) Vera Zvonareva (first round)
5. (Slovakia) Daniela Hantuchová / (Japan) Ai Sugiyama (quarterfinals)
6. (China) Yan Zi / (China) Zheng Jie (first round)
7. (South Africa) Liezel Huber / (United States) Martina Navratilova (final)
8. (Japan) Shinobu Asagoe / (Slovenia) Katarina Srebotnik (semifinals)

== Draw ==
Key

- Q = Qualifier
- WC = Wild card
- LL = Lucky loser
- Alt = Alternate
- ITF = ITF entry
- PR = Protected ranking
- SR = Special ranking
- SE = Special exempt
- JE = Junior exempt
- JR = Junior Accelerator Programme entrant
- CO = College Accelerator Programme entrant
- NG = Next Gen Accelerator Program entrant
- w/o = Walkover
- r = Retired
- d = Defaulted

=== Finals ===
Semifinals
1	(United States) Lisa Raymond (Australia) Samantha Stosur	6	6
(Russia) Svetlana Kuznetsova (France) Amélie Mauresmo	4	2
8	(Japan) Shinobu Asagoe (Slovenia) Katarina Srebotnik	7	1	3
7	(South Africa) Liezel Huber (United States) Martina Navratilova	6^{7}	6	6

Final
1	(United States) Lisa Raymond (Australia) Samantha Stosur	6	7
7	(South Africa) Liezel Huber (United States) Martina Navratilova	4	5

=== Top half ===
First round
1	(United States) L Raymond (Australia) S Stosur	7	6
(Russia) A Rodionova (Germany) J Wöhr	5	2
(Switzerland) E Gagliardi (Argentina) ME Salerni	4	4
(France) M Bartoli (Spain) V Ruano Pascual	6	6
(Argentina) G Dulko (Russia) M Kirilenko	5	2
LL	(Ukraine) A Bondarenko (Ukraine) K Bondarenko	7	6
(Greece) E Daniilidou (Spain) A Medina Garrigues	1	6	6
6	(China) Z Yan (China) J Zheng	6	0	1
3	(Germany) AL Grönefeld (United States) M Shaughnessy	6	5	6^{4}
(Netherlands) M Krajicek (United States) C Morariu	3	7	7
(Russia) S Kuznetsova (France) A Mauresmo	6	6
WC	(France) N Dechy (France) T Golovin	3	3
(Spain) L Domínguez Lino (United States) M Tu	3	6^{6}
(United States) C Gullickson (Australia) B Stewart	6	7
(Russia) A Myskina (Russia) D Safina	4	2
5	(Slovakia) D Hantuchová (Japan) A Sugiyama	6	6

Second round
1	(United States) L Raymond (Australia) S Stosur	6	6
(France) M Bartoli (Spain) V Ruano Pascual	1	2
LL	(Ukraine) A Bondarenko (Ukraine) K Bondarenko	1	6^{5}
(Greece) E Daniilidou (Spain) A Medina Garrigues	6	7
(Netherlands) M Krajicek (United States) C Morariu	3	6	2
(Russia) S Kuznetsova (France) A Mauresmo	6	3	6
(United States) C Gullickson (Australia) B Stewart	3	6	2
5	(Slovakia) D Hantuchová (Japan) A Sugiyama	6	2	6

Quarterfinals
1	(United States) L Raymond (Australia) S Stosur	6	4	7
8	(Greece) E Daniilidou (Spain) A Medina Garrigues	3	6	6^{3}
(Russia) S Kuznetsova (France) A Mauresmo	7	7
5	(Slovakia) D Hantuchová (Japan) A Sugiyama	6^{7}	5

Semifinals
1	(United States) L Raymond (Australia) S Stosur	6	6
(Russia) S Kuznetsova (France) A Mauresmo	4	2

=== Bottom half ===
First round
8	(Japan) S Asagoe (Slovenia) K Srebotnik	7	6
(United States) J Russell (Romania) A Vanc	6^{3}	1
Q	(Czech Republic) E Birnerová (Russia) G Voskoboeva	2	4
WC	(Belgium) K Clijsters (Belgium) C Maes	6	6
WC	(Serbia and Montenegro) A Ivanovic (India) S Mirza	6	6
(Italy) ME Camerin (Italy) T Garbin	3	4
(Czech Republic) K Peschke (Italy) F Schiavone	6	6
4	(Russia) E Likhovtseva (Russia) V Zvonareva	3	0
7	(South Africa) L Huber (United States) M Navratilova	5	6	6
(Russia) N Petrova (Switzerland) P Schnyder	7	2	2
(Russia) V Dushevina (Israel) S Pe'er	2	3
(Czech Republic) I Benešová (Czech Republic) B Strýcová	6	6
(China) T Li (China) T Sun	6	6
(Ukraine) M Koryttseva (Croatia) J Kostanić	4	3
(France) E Loit (Australia) N Pratt	7	6
2	(Zimbabwe) C Black (Australia) R Stubbs	6^{0}	3

Second round
8	(Japan) S Asagoe (Slovenia) K Srebotnik	6	7
WC	(Belgium) K Clijsters (Belgium) C Maes	3	5
WC	(Serbia and Montenegro) A Ivanovic (India) S Mirza	6	6
(Czech Republic) K Peschke (Italy) F Schiavone	1	3
7	(South Africa) L Huber (United States) M Navratilova	6	7
(Czech Republic) I Benešová (Czech Republic) B Strýcová	3	6^{2}
(China) T Li (China) T Sun	6	6
(France) E Loit (Australia) N Pratt	2	4

Quarterfinals
8	(Japan) S Asagoe (Slovenia) K Srebotnik	7	6
WC	(Serbia and Montenegro) A Ivanovic (India) S Mirza	5	0
7	(South Africa) L Huber (United States) M Navratilova	7	6
(China) T Li (China) T Sun	6^{3}	4

Semifinals
8	(Japan) S Asagoe (Slovenia) K Srebotnik	7	1	3
7	(South Africa) L Huber (United States) M Navratilova	6^{7}	6	6

== Qualifying ==
=== Qualifying seeds ===
1. (France) Stéphanie Foretz / (Italy) Antonella Serra Zanetti (first round)
2. (Poland) Marta Domachowska / (Italy) Roberta Vinci (second round)

=== Qualifiers ===
1. (Czech Republic) Eva Birnerová / (Russia) Galina Voskoboeva

=== Lucky losers ===
1. (Ukraine) Alona Bondarenko / (Ukraine) Kateryna Bondarenko

=== Qualifying draw ===
First round
1	(France) Stéphanie Foretz (Italy) Antonella Serra Zanetti	1
(Ukraine) Alona Bondarenko (Ukraine) Kateryna Bondarenko	8
WC	(United States) Jamea Jackson (United States) Shenay Perry	8
(Italy) Mara Santangelo (United States) Mashona Washington	5
(Germany) Martina Müller (Spain) Arantxa Parra Santonja	2
(Czech Republic) Eva Birnerová (Russia) Galina Voskoboeva	8
(Australia) Lisa McShea (Venezuela) Milagros Sequera	3
2	(Poland) Marta Domachowska (Italy) Roberta Vinci	8

Second round
(Ukraine) Alona Bondarenko (Ukraine) Kateryna Bondarenko	w/o
WC	(United States) Jamea Jackson (United States) Shenay Perry
(Czech Republic) Eva Birnerová (Russia) Galina Voskoboeva	8
2	(Poland) Marta Domachowska (Italy) Roberta Vinci	5

Qualifying competition
(Ukraine) Alona Bondarenko (Ukraine) Kateryna Bondarenko	6^{11}	6	2
(Czech Republic) Eva Birnerová (Russia) Galina Voskoboeva	7^{13}	3	6
