= 2006 Mutua Madrileña Masters Madrid – Doubles =

Doubles
- 2006 Mutua Madrileña Masters Madrid

Final
- Champions: (United States) Bob Bryan (United States) Mike Bryan
- Runners-up: (The Bahamas) Mark Knowles (Canada) Daniel Nestor
- Score: 7–5, 6–4

Details
- Draw: 16
- Seeds: 4

Events
Singles	Doubles
← 2005 ·	Mutua Madrileña Masters Madrid	· 2007 →

The 2006 Madrid Masters (also known as the Mutua Madrileña Masters Madrid for sponsorship reasons) was a tennis tournament played on indoor hard courts. It is the 5th edition of the Madrid Masters, and is part of the ATP Masters Series of the 2006 ATP Tour. It took place at the Madrid Arena in Madrid, Spain, from October 16 through October 23, 2006.

Bob Bryan and Mike Bryan were the defending champions, and won in the final 6–3, 7–6^{(7–4)}, against Mariusz Fyrstenberg and Marcin Matkowski.

== Seeds ==
A champion seed is indicated in bold text while text in italics indicates the round in which that seed was eliminated.

1. **(United States) Bob Bryan / (United States) Mike Bryan (champions)**
2. (Sweden) Jonas Björkman / (Belarus) Max Mirnyi (semifinal)
3. (The Bahamas) Mark Knowles / (Canada) Daniel Nestor (final)
4. (Australia) Paul Hanley / (Zimbabwe) Kevin Ullyett (semifinal)

== Draw ==
Key

- Q = Qualifier
- WC = Wild card
- LL = Lucky loser
- Alt = Alternate
- ITF = ITF entry
- PR = Protected ranking
- SR = Special ranking
- SE = Special exempt
- JE = Junior exempt
- JR = Junior Accelerator Programme entrant
- CO = College Accelerator Programme entrant
- NG = Next Gen Accelerator Program entrant
- w/o = Walkover
- r = Retired
- d = Defaulted

=== Draw ===
First round
1	**(United States) B Bryan** **(United States) M Bryan**	**6**	**6**
(Chile) F González (Russia) M Youzhny	1	3
**(France) F Santoro** **(Serbia) N Zimonjić**	**6**	**7^{7}**
WC	(Sweden) S Aspelin (Australia) T Perry	3	6^{4}
4	**(Australia) P Hanley** **(Zimbabwe) K Ullyett**	3	**6**	**[10]**
(Argentina) D Nalbandian (Argentina) S Prieto	**6**	2	[2]
**(Czech Republic) L Dlouhý** **(Czech Republic) P Vízner**	**7^{7}**	**6**
(Serbia) N Djokovic (Czech Republic) L Friedl	6^{3}	3
**(Israel) J Erlich** **(Israel) A Ram**	**6**	**6**
(India) M Bhupathi (United States) J Blake	0	3
WC	(Spain) F López (Spain) R Nadal	**6**	5	[9]
3	**(The Bahamas) M Knowles** **(Canada) D Nestor**	4	**7**	**[11]**
(Czech Republic) M Damm (India) L Paes	**7^{7}**	2	[10]
**(Poland) M Fyrstenberg** **(Poland) M Matkowski**	6^{3}	**6**	**[12]**
(Czech Republic) T Berdych (Finland) J Nieminen	4	3
2	**(Sweden) J Björkman** **(Belarus) M Mirnyi**	**6**	**6**

Quarterfinals
1	**(United States) B Bryan** **(United States) M Bryan**	**7^{8}**	**7**
(France) F Santoro (Serbia) N Zimonjić	6^{6}	5
4	**(Australia) P Hanley** **(Zimbabwe) K Ullyett**	w/o
(Czech Republic) L Dlouhý (Czech Republic) P Vízner
(Israel) J Erlich (Israel) A Ram	**6**	6^{3}	[9]
3	**(The Bahamas) M Knowles** **(Canada) D Nestor**	4	**7^{7}**	**[11]**
(Poland) M Fyrstenberg (Poland) M Matkowski	6^{3}	4
2	**(Sweden) J Björkman** **(Belarus) M Mirnyi**	**7^{7}**	**6**

Semifinals
1	**(United States) B Bryan** **(United States) M Bryan**	6^{10}	**6**	**[10]**
4	(Australia) P Hanley (Zimbabwe) K Ullyett	**7^{12}**	3	[6]
3	**(The Bahamas) M Knowles** **(Canada) D Nestor**	**6**	**6**
2	(Sweden) J Björkman (Belarus) M Mirnyi	4	4

Final
1	**(United States) B Bryan** **(United States) M Bryan**	**7**	**6**
3	(The Bahamas) M Knowles (Canada) D Nestor	5	4
