= 2006 Italian Open – Women's doubles =

Women's doubles
- 2006 Italian Open

Final
- Champions: (Slovakia) Daniela Hantuchová (Japan) Ai Sugiyama
- Runners-up: (Italy) Francesca Schiavone (Czech Republic) Květa Peschke
- Score: 3–6, 6–3, 6–1

Details
- Draw: 28
- Seeds: 8

Events
Singles	men	women
Doubles	men	women
← 2005 ·	Italian Open	· 2007 →

The women's doubles tournament at the 2006 Italian Open took place between 8 May and 22 May on the outdoor clay courts of the Foro Italico in Rome, Italy. Daniela Hantuchová and Ai Sugiyama won the title, defeating Francesca Schiavone and Květa Peschke in the final.

== Seeds ==
1. (United States) Lisa Raymond / (Australia) Samantha Stosur (second round)
2. (Zimbabwe) Cara Black / (Australia) Rennae Stubbs (semifinals)
3. (South Africa) Liezel Huber / (United States) Martina Navratilova (second round)
4. (Slovakia) Daniela Hantuchová / (Japan) Ai Sugiyama (champions)
5. (Spain) Anabel Medina Garrigues / (Slovenia) Katarina Srebotnik (semifinals)
6. (Spain) Virginia Ruano Pascual / (Argentina) Paola Suárez (first round)
7. (Russia) Elena Dementieva / (Italy) Flavia Pennetta (withdrew)
8. (Czech Republic) Květa Peschke / (Italy) Francesca Schiavone (final)

== Draw ==
=== Key ===
- Q = Qualifier
- WC = Wild card
- LL = Lucky loser
- Alt = Alternate
- ITF = ITF entry
- PR = Protected ranking
- SR = Special ranking
- SE = Special exempt
- JE = Junior exempt
- JR = Junior Accelerator Programme entrant
- CO = College Accelerator Programme entrant
- NG = Next Gen Accelerator Program entrant
- w/o = Walkover
- r = Retired
- d = Defaulted

=== Finals ===
Semifinals
5	(Spain) Anabel Medina Garrigues (Slovenia) Katarina Srebotnik	5	2
8	(Czech Republic) Květa Peschke (Italy) Francesca Schiavone	7	6
4	(Slovakia) Daniela Hantuchová (Japan) Ai Sugiyama	6	6
2	(Zimbabwe) Cara Black (Australia) Rennae Stubbs	4	0

Final
8	(Czech Republic) Květa Peschke (Italy) Francesca Schiavone	6	3	1
4	(Slovakia) Daniela Hantuchová (Japan) Ai Sugiyama	3	6	6

=== Top half ===
First round
WC	(Italy) K Knapp (Italy) R Oprandi	4	3
(Argentina) G Dulko (Russia) M Kirilenko	6	6
(Russia) E Likhovtseva (Russia) A Myskina	6	1	6^{4}
(France) N Dechy (Germany) AL Grönefeld	3	6	7
(Russia) V Dushevina (Russia) G Voskoboeva	5	3
5	(Spain) A Medina Garrigues (Slovenia) K Srebotnik	7	6
(Poland) M Domachowska (Switzerland) E Gagliardi	3	3
(Russia) D Safina (Italy) R Vinci	6	6
Q	(Belarus) V Azarenka (Ukraine) K Bondarenko	5	2
(Ukraine) Y Beygelzimer (Romania) A Vanc	7	6
(United States) M Tu (Russia) V Zvonareva	4	4
8	(Czech Republic) K Peschke (Italy) F Schiavone	6	6

Second round
1	(United States) L Raymond (Australia) S Stosur	3	5
(Argentina) G Dulko (Russia) M Kirilenko	6	7
(France) N Dechy (Germany) AL Grönefeld	3	0
5	(Spain) A Medina Garrigues (Slovenia) K Srebotnik	6	6
3	(South Africa) L Huber (United States) M Navratilova	3	7	6^{1}
(Russia) D Safina (Italy) R Vinci	6	6^{3}	7
(Ukraine) Y Beygelzimer (Romania) A Vanc	1	2
8	(Czech Republic) K Peschke (Italy) F Schiavone	6	6

Quarterfinals
(Argentina) G Dulko (Russia) M Kirilenko	6^{5}	6	5
5	(Spain) A Medina Garrigues (Slovenia) K Srebotnik	7	4	7
(Russia) D Safina (Italy) R Vinci	5	3
8	(Czech Republic) K Peschke (Italy) F Schiavone	7	6

Semifinals
5	(Spain) A Medina Garrigues (Slovenia) K Srebotnik	5	2
8	(Czech Republic) K Peschke (Italy) F Schiavone	7	6

=== Bottom half ===
First round
6	(Spain) V Ruano Pascual (Argentina) P Suárez	2	2
(China) T Li (China) T Sun	6	6
LL	(Japan) A Morigami (Japan) A Nakamura	2	1
(Italy) ME Camerin (Italy) T Garbin	6	6
(Bosnia and Herzegovina) M Jugić-Salkić (Slovenia) T Križan	6	3	3
(Italy) M Santangelo (United States) M Washington	4	6	6
LL	(Italy) C Dentoni (Italy) V Perugini	2	1
(Slovakia) J Husárová (Israel) S Pe'er	6	6
(Australia) N Pratt (Australia) B Stewart	6	6
WC	(Italy) S Errani (Italy) G Gabba	2	2
(Czech Republic) G Navrátilová (Czech Republic) V Uhlířová	6	3	6
(Serbia and Montenegro) J Janković (France) V Razzano	1	6	0

Second round
(China) T Li (China) T Sun	6	6
(Italy) ME Camerin (Italy) T Garbin	1	2
(Italy) M Santangelo (United States) M Washington	2	1
4	(Slovakia) D Hantuchová (Japan) A Sugiyama	6	6
5	(Slovakia) J Husárová (Israel) S Pe'er	4	2
(Australia) N Pratt (Australia) B Stewart	6	6
(Czech Republic) G Navrátilová (Czech Republic) V Uhlířová	3	4
2	(Zimbabwe) C Black (Australia) R Stubbs	6	6

Quarterfinals
(China) T Li (China) T Sun	4	1
4	(Slovakia) D Hantuchová (Japan) A Sugiyama	6	6
5	(Australia) N Pratt (Australia) B Stewart	6^{5}	6	6^{5}
2	(Zimbabwe) C Black (Australia) R Stubbs	7	4	7

Semifinals
4	(Slovakia) D Hantuchová (Japan) A Sugiyama	6	6
2	(Zimbabwe) C Black (Australia) R Stubbs	4	0
