= 2006 Open 13 =

- Date: 13–20 February
- Edition: 14th
- Category: International Series
- Draw: 32S / 16D
- Prize money: $575,000
- Surface: Hard / indoor
- Location: Marseille, France

Champions

Singles
- (France) Arnaud Clément

Doubles
- (Czech Republic) Martin Damm / (Czech Republic) Radek Štěpánek
- Open 13

The 2006 Open 13 was an ATP men's tennis tournament played on indoor hard courts in Marseille, France that was part of the International Series of the 2006 ATP Tour. It was the 14th edition of the tournament and was held from 13 February until 20 February 2006. Unseeded Arnaud Clément, who entered the main draw on a wildcard, won the singles title.

== Finals ==
=== Singles ===
(France) Arnaud Clément defeated (Croatia) Mario Ančić 6–4, 6–2

- It was Clément's 1st title of the year and the 8th of his career.

=== Doubles ===
(Czech Republic) Martin Damm / (Czech Republic) Radek Štěpánek defeated (The Bahamas) Mark Knowles / (Canada) Daniel Nestor 6–2, 6–7^{(4–7)}, [10–3]

- It was Damm's 1st title of the year and the 32nd of his career. It was Štěpánek's 1st title of the year and the 12th of his career.
