= 2006 ABN AMRO World Tennis Tournament =

- Date: 20–26 February
- Edition: 34th
- Category: ATP International Series Gold
- Draw: 32S / 16D
- Prize money: $900,000
- Surface: Hardcourt / Indoor
- Location: Rotterdam, Netherlands
- Venue: Rotterdam Ahoy

Champions

Singles
- (Czech Republic) Radek Štěpánek

Doubles
- (Australia) Paul Hanley / (Zimbabwe) Kevin Ullyett
- ABN AMRO World Tennis Tournament

The 2006 ABN AMRO World Tennis Tournament was a men's tennis tournament played on indoor hard courts. It was the 34th edition of the event known that year as the ABN AMRO World Tennis Tournament and was part of the ATP International Series Gold of the 2006 ATP Tour. It took place at the Rotterdam Ahoy indoor sporting arena in Rotterdam, Netherlands, from 20 February through 26 February 2006. Radek Štěpánek won the singles title.

The singles field lined up ATP No. 2, French Open champion, Monte Carlo, Rome, Canada and Madrid Masters winner Rafael Nadal, Australian Open quarterfinalist, Tennis Masters Cup semifinalist Nikolay Davydenko, and Madrid and Paris Masters quarterfinalist David Ferrer. Also announced were St. Petersburg champion Thomas Johansson, Auckland runner-up Mario Ančić, Radek Štěpánek, Sébastien Grosjean and Tomáš Berdych.

== Finals ==
=== Singles ===
(Czech Republic) Radek Štěpánek defeated (Belgium) Christophe Rochus, 6–0, 6–3

- It was Radek Štěpánek's 1st career title.

=== Doubles ===
(Australia) Paul Hanley / (Zimbabwe) Kevin Ullyett defeated (Israel) Jonathan Erlich / (Israel) Andy Ram 7–6^{(7–4)}, 7–6^{(7–2)}
