= 2005 Legg Mason Tennis Classic – Doubles =

Doubles
- 2005 Legg Mason Tennis Classic

Final
- Champion: (United States) Mike Bryan (United States) Bob Bryan
- Runner-up: (Zimbabwe) Wayne Black (Zimbabwe) Kevin Ullyett
- Score: 6–4, 6–2

Details
- Draw: 16
- Seeds: 4

Events
| Singles | Doubles |
- Washington Open

Chris Haggard and Robbie Koenig were the defending champions. Haggard did not participate this year. Koenig partnered with Jim Thomas, losing in the first round.

Mike Bryan and Bob Bryan won in the final 6–4, 6–2, against Wayne Black and Kevin Ullyett.

== Seeds ==
1. (United States) Mike Bryan / (United States) Bob Bryan (champions)
2. (Zimbabwe) Wayne Black / (Zimbabwe) Kevin Ullyett (final)
3. (India) Mahesh Bhupathi / (Czech Republic) Martin Damm (semifinals)
4. (The Bahamas) Mark Knowles / (Czech Republic) Radek Štěpánek (semifinals)

== Draw ==
Key

- Q = Qualifier
- WC = Wild card
- LL = Lucky loser
- Alt = Alternate
- ITF = ITF entry
- PR = Protected ranking
- SR = Special ranking
- SE = Special exempt
- JE = Junior exempt
- JR = Junior Accelerator Programme entrant
- CO = College Accelerator Programme entrant
- NG = Next Gen Accelerator Program entrant
- w/o = Walkover
- r = Retired
- d = Defaulted

=== Draw ===
First round
1 | (United States) B Bryan (United States) M Bryan | 6 | 6
(France) S Grosjean (Slovakia) D Hrbatý | 4 | 1
(Australia) P Hanley (Australia) S Huss | 6 | 6
WC | (United States) J Atas (Canada) M Scott | 1 | 3
3 | (India) M Bhupathi (Czech Republic) M Damm | 6
(South Africa) W Moodie (Czech Republic) T Zíb | 4 | r
WC | (United States) P Goldstein (United States) S Oudsema | 6 | 6^{5} | 4
(Slovakia) K Beck (Czech Republic) T Berdych | 4 | 7^{7} | 6
(Czech Republic) J Hernych (Croatia) I Karlović | 3 | 6 | 6
(South Africa) R Koenig (United States) J Thomas | 6 | 3 | 4
(Peru) L Horna (Chile) N Massú | 3 | 1
4 | (The Bahamas) M Knowles (Czech Republic) R Štěpánek | 6 | 6
(Israel) J Erlich (Israel) A Ram | 4 | 6 | 3
(Australia) J Kerr (United States) G Oliver | 6 | 2 | 6
(United States) J Palmer (United States) T Parrott | 6^{4} | 3
2 | (Zimbabwe) W Black (Zimbabwe) K Ullyett | 7^{7} | 6

Quarterfinals
1 | (United States) B Bryan (United States) M Bryan | 6 | 7^{7}
(Australia) P Hanley (Australia) S Huss | 4 | 6^{4}
3 | (India) M Bhupathi (Czech Republic) M Damm | 6 | 6
(Slovakia) K Beck (Czech Republic) T Berdych | 4 | 4
(Czech Republic) J Hernych (Croatia) I Karlović | 6 | 3 | 2
4 | (The Bahamas) M Knowles (Czech Republic) R Štěpánek | 3 | 6 | 6
(Australia) J Kerr (United States) G Oliver | 6 | 5 | 3
2 | (Zimbabwe) W Black (Zimbabwe) K Ullyett | 3 | 7 | 6

Semifinals
1 | (United States) B Bryan (United States) M Bryan | 7^{7} | 7^{7}
3 | (India) M Bhupathi (Czech Republic) M Damm | 6^{3} | 6^{4}
4 | (The Bahamas) M Knowles (Czech Republic) R Štěpánek
2 | (Zimbabwe) W Black (Zimbabwe) K Ullyett | w/o

Final
1 | (United States) B Bryan (United States) M Bryan | 6 | 6
2 | (Zimbabwe) W Black (Zimbabwe) K Ullyett | 4 | 2
