= 2006 Rogers Masters – Doubles =

Doubles
- 2006 Rogers Masters

Final
- Champions: (United States) Bob Bryan (United States) Mike Bryan
- Runners-up: (Australia) Paul Hanley (Zimbabwe) Kevin Ullyett
- Score: 6–3, 7–5

Details
- Draw: 24
- Seeds: 8

Events
Singles	Doubles
- Rogers Masters

Wayne Black and Kevin Ullyett were the defending champions, but Black retired in 2006, and only Ullyett competed that year.
Ullyett partnered with Paul Hanley, but Bob Bryan and Mike Bryan defeated them 6–3, 7–5, in the final.

== Seeds ==
All seeds receive a bye into the second round.

1. (United States) Bob Bryan / (United States) Mike Bryan (champions)
2. (Sweden) Jonas Björkman / (Belarus) Max Mirnyi (quarterfinals)
3. (Australia) Paul Hanley / (Zimbabwe) Kevin Ullyett (final)
4. (The Bahamas) Mark Knowles / (Canada) Daniel Nestor (semifinals)
5. (France) Fabrice Santoro / (Serbia) Nenad Zimonjić (quarterfinals)
6. (Israel) Jonathan Erlich / (Israel) Andy Ram (second round)
7. (Czech Republic) Martin Damm / (India) Leander Paes (semifinals)
8. (Czech Republic) Lukáš Dlouhý / (Czech Republic) Pavel Vízner (second round)

== Draw ==
Key

- Q = Qualifier
- WC = Wild card
- LL = Lucky loser
- Alt = Alternate
- ITF = ITF entry
- PR = Protected ranking
- SR = Special ranking
- SE = Special exempt
- JE = Junior exempt
- JR = Junior Accelerator Programme entrant
- CO = College Accelerator Programme entrant
- NG = Next Gen Accelerator Program entrant
- w/o = Walkover
- r = Retired
- d = Defaulted

=== Finals ===
Semifinals
1	(United States) Bob Bryan (United States) Mike Bryan	6	6^{6}	[10]
4	(The Bahamas) Mark Knowles (Canada) Daniel Nestor	3	7	[5]
3	(Australia) Paul Hanley (Zimbabwe) Kevin Ullyett	3	6	[10]
7	(Czech Republic) Martin Damm (India) Leander Paes	6	3	[4]

Final
1	(United States) Bob Bryan (United States) Mike Bryan	6	7
3	(Australia) Paul Hanley (Zimbabwe) Kevin Ullyett	3	5

=== Top half ===
First round
(Poland) M Fyrstenberg (Poland) M Matkowski	3	4
(Chile) F González (Croatia) I Ljubičić	6	6
WC	(Spain) F López (Spain) R Nadal	7	6
(Czech Republic) L Friedl (Czech Republic) C Suk	6^{5}	4
(Argentina) G Gaudio (Argentina) S Prieto	7	5	[10]
ALT	(South Africa) C Haggard (United States) J Thomas	5	7	[4]
WC	(Canada) P Bester (Canada) F Dancevic	2	4
(Sweden) S Aspelin (United States) T Perry	6	6

Second round
1	(United States) B Bryan (United States) M Bryan	6	6
(Chile) F González (Croatia) I Ljubičić	2	4
WC	(Spain) F López (Spain) R Nadal	6^{0}	4
5	(France) F Santoro (Serbia) N Zimonjić	7	6
4	(The Bahamas) M Knowles (Canada) D Nestor	6	7
(Argentina) G Gaudio (Argentina) S Prieto	3	6^{2}
(Sweden) S Aspelin (United States) T Perry	6	6
8	(Czech Republic) L Dlouhý (Czech Republic) P Vízner	1	3

Quarterfinals
1	(United States) B Bryan (United States) M Bryan	3	6	[10]
5	(France) F Santoro (Serbia) N Zimonjić	6	4	[7]
4	(The Bahamas) M Knowles (Canada) D Nestor	2	6	[10]
8	(Sweden) S Aspelin (United States) T Perry	6	3	[2]

Semifinals
1	(United States) B Bryan (United States) M Bryan	6	6^{6}	[10]
4	(The Bahamas) M Knowles (Canada) D Nestor	3	7	[5]

=== Bottom half ===
First round
(Australia) W Arthurs (Slovakia) D Hrbatý	6	4	[10]
(Argentina) J Acasuso (Argentina) D Nalbandian	1	6	[1]
(Spain) D Ferrer (Spain) T Robredo	6	3	[11]
(Sweden) R Lindstedt (Finland) J Nieminen	4	6	[9]
(Czech Republic) F Čermák (Austria) J Knowle	4	0
(Czech Republic) T Berdych (Czech Republic) J Levinský	6	6
(Russia) M Safin (Russia) D Tursunov	6	6
(United States) J Blake (United States) R Ginepri	4	4

Second round
6	(Israel) J Erlich (Israel) A Ram	4	6	[6]
(Australia) W Arthurs (Slovakia) D Hrbatý	6	3	[10]
(Spain) D Ferrer (Spain) T Robredo	4	7	[4]
3	(Australia) P Hanley (Zimbabwe) K Ullyett	6	5	[10]
7	(Czech Republic) M Damm (India) L Paes	7	6
(Czech Republic) T Berdych (Czech Republic) J Levinský	5	1
(Russia) M Safin (Russia) D Tursunov	4	2
2	(Sweden) J Björkman (Belarus) M Mirnyi	6	6

Quarterfinals
(Australia) W Arthurs (Slovakia) D Hrbatý	4	3
3	(Australia) P Hanley (Zimbabwe) K Ullyett	6	6
7	(Czech Republic) M Damm (India) L Paes	7	7
2	(Sweden) J Björkman (Belarus) M Mirnyi	6^{4}	5

Semifinals
3	(Australia) P Hanley (Zimbabwe) K Ullyett	3	6	[10]
7	(Czech Republic) M Damm (India) L Paes	6	3	[4]
