= 2006 NASDAQ-100 Open – Men's doubles =

Men's doubles
- 2006 NASDAQ-100 Open

Final
- Champions: (Sweden) Jonas Björkman (Belarus) Max Mirnyi
- Runners-up: (United States) Bob Bryan (United States) Mike Bryan
- Score: 6–4, 6–4

Events
Singles	men	women
Doubles	men	women
← 2005 ·	NASDAQ-100 Open	· 2007 →

Jonas Björkman and Max Mirnyi were the defending champions.

Björkman and Mirnyi successfully defended their title, defeating Bob Bryan and Mike Bryan 6–4, 6–4 in the final.

== Seeds ==
1. (United States) Bob Bryan / (United States) Mike Bryan (final)
2. (Sweden) Jonas Björkman / (Belarus) Max Mirnyi (champions)
3. (The Bahamas) Mark Knowles / (Canada) Daniel Nestor (first round)
4. (Australia) Paul Hanley / (Zimbabwe) Kevin Ullyett (semifinals)
5. (France) Fabrice Santoro / (Serbia and Montenegro) Nenad Zimonjić (second round)
6. (Israel) Jonathan Erlich / (Israel) Andy Ram (semifinals)
7. (Czech Republic) František Čermák / (Czech Republic) Leoš Friedl (first round)
8. (Sweden) Simon Aspelin / (Australia) Todd Perry (first round)

== Draw ==
Key

- Q = Qualifier
- WC = Wild card
- LL = Lucky loser
- Alt = Alternate
- ITF = ITF entry
- PR = Protected ranking
- SR = Special ranking
- SE = Special exempt
- JE = Junior exempt
- JR = Junior Accelerator Programme entrant
- CO = College Accelerator Programme entrant
- NG = Next Gen Accelerator Program entrant
- w/o = Walkover
- r = Retired
- d = Defaulted

=== Finals ===
Semifinals
1	(United States) Bob Bryan (United States) Mike Bryan	6	6
6	(Israel) Jonathan Erlich (Israel) Andy Ram	2	4
4	(Australia) Paul Hanley (Zimbabwe) Kevin Ullyett	3	6^{1}
2	(Sweden) Jonas Björkman (Belarus) Max Mirnyi	6	7^{7}

Final
1	(United States) Bob Bryan (United States) Mike Bryan	4	4
2	(Sweden) Jonas Björkman (Belarus) Max Mirnyi	6	6

=== Top half ===
First round
1	(United States) B Bryan (United States) M Bryan	6	7
(United States) J Gimelstob (Australia) S Huss	3	5
(France) S Grosjean (France) F Serra	7	6
WC	(Australia) M Philippoussis (Russia) M Safin	5	3
(South Africa) C Haggard (South Africa) W Moodie	7	6
(Slovakia) D Hrbatý (Slovakia) M Mertiňák	5	1
(France) A Clément (France) M Llodra	6	7^{7}
8	(Sweden) S Aspelin (Australia) T Perry	3	6^{2}
3	(The Bahamas) M Knowles (Canada) D Nestor	6	4	[3]
(Czech Republic) C Suk (Czech Republic) P Vízner	3	6	[10]
(Russia) D Tursunov (Russia) M Youzhny	4	4
(Czech Republic) T Berdych (Czech Republic) J Levinský	6	6
(Chile) F González (Chile) N Massú	4	6	[7]
(Sweden) R Lindstedt (Finland) J Nieminen	6	4	[10]
(Australia) J Kerr (United States) J Thomas	1	5
6	(Israel) J Erlich (Israel) A Ram	6	7

Second round
1	(United States) B Bryan (United States) M Bryan	6	6
(France) S Grosjean (France) F Serra	2	1
(South Africa) C Haggard (South Africa) W Moodie	4	6	[10]
(France) A Clément (France) M Llodra	6	3	[5]
(Czech Republic) C Suk (Czech Republic) P Vízner	6	4	[10]
(Czech Republic) T Berdych (Czech Republic) J Levinský	4	6	[7]
(Sweden) R Lindstedt (Finland) J Nieminen	5	7^{7}	[4]
6	(Israel) J Erlich (Israel) A Ram	7	6^{5}	[10]

Quarterfinals
1	(United States) B Bryan (United States) M Bryan	7	7
(South Africa) C Haggard (South Africa) W Moodie	5	5
(Czech Republic) C Suk (Czech Republic) P Vízner	7^{11}	6^{7}	[3]
6	(Israel) J Erlich (Israel) A Ram	6^{9}	7^{9}	[10]

Semifinals
1	(United States) B Bryan (United States) M Bryan	6	6
6	(Israel) J Erlich (Israel) A Ram	2	4

=== Bottom half ===
First round
5	(France) F Santoro (Serbia and Montenegro) N Zimonjić	6	6
(Poland) M Fyrstenberg (Poland) M Matkowski	2	3
(Austria) J Knowle (Romania) A Pavel	3	5
(Croatia) M Ančić (Croatia) I Ljubičić	6	7
(Russia) I Andreev (Russia) N Davydenko	6	5	[10]
(Spain) D Ferrer (Spain) T Robredo	3	7	[6]
(United States) T Parrott (Netherlands) R Wassen	6	3	[2]
4	(Australia) P Hanley (Zimbabwe) K Ullyett	4	6	[10]
7	(Czech Republic) F Čermák (Czech Republic) L Friedl	7^{15}	2	[6]
(Czech Republic) M Damm (Czech Republic) R Štěpánek	6^{13}	6	[10]
WC	(Argentina) G Coria (Ecuador) L Manrique	2	5
(United States) R Ginepri (United States) A Roddick	6	7
(Argentina) G Etlis (Argentina) M García	6	2	[10]
(Argentina) J Acasuso (Argentina) S Prieto	3	6	[7]
(Spain) F López (Spain) F Verdasco	1	1
2	(Sweden) J Björkman (Belarus) M Mirnyi	6	6

Second round
5	(France) F Santoro (Serbia and Montenegro) N Zimonjić	5	7^{7}	[4]
(Croatia) M Ančić (Croatia) I Ljubičić	7	6^{3}	[10]
(Russia) I Andreev (Russia) N Davydenko	7^{7}	3	[8]
4	(Australia) P Hanley (Zimbabwe) K Ullyett	6^{5}	6	[10]
(Czech Republic) M Damm (Czech Republic) R Štěpánek	w/o
(United States) R Ginepri (United States) A Roddick
(Argentina) G Etlis (Argentina) M García	3	2
2	(Sweden) J Björkman (Belarus) M Mirnyi	6	6

Quarterfinals
(Croatia) M Ančić (Croatia) I Ljubičić	6	6^{2}	[7]
4	(Australia) P Hanley (Zimbabwe) K Ullyett	3	7^{7}	[10]
(Czech Republic) M Damm (Czech Republic) R Štěpánek	4	3
2	(Sweden) J Björkman (Belarus) M Mirnyi	6	6

Semifinals
4	(Australia) P Hanley (Zimbabwe) K Ullyett	3	6^{1}
2	(Sweden) J Björkman (Belarus) M Mirnyi	6	7^{7}
