= 2006 Legg Mason Tennis Classic =

- Date: July 31 – August 6
- Edition: 37th
- Category: International Series
- Draw: 64S / 16D
- Prize money: $575,000
- Surface: Hard / Outdoor
- Location: Washington, D.C., United States
- Venue: William H.G. FitzGerald Tennis Center

Champions

Singles
- (France) Arnaud Clément

Doubles
- (United States) Bob Bryan / (United States) Mike Bryan
← 2005 ·	Washington Open	· 2007 →

The 2006 Legg Mason Tennis Classic was the 37th edition of this men's tennis tournament and was played on outdoor hard courts. The tournament was part of the International Series of the 2006 ATP Tour. It was held at the William H.G. FitzGerald Tennis Center in Washington, D.C. in the United States from July 31 through August 6, 2006. Eleventh-seeded Arnaud Clément won the singles title.

== Finals ==
=== Singles ===
(France) Arnaud Clément defeated (United Kingdom) Andy Murray, 7–6^{(7–3)}, 6–2

- It was Clément's 2nd title of the year and the 4th of his career.

=== Doubles ===
(United States) Bob Bryan / (United States) Mike Bryan defeated (Australia) Paul Hanley / (Zimbabwe) Kevin Ullyett, 6–3, 5–7, [10–3]
