= 2006 Hamburg Masters – Doubles =

Doubles
- 2006 Hamburg Masters

Final
- Champions: (Australia) Paul Hanley (Zimbabwe) Kevin Ullyett
- Runners-up: (The Bahamas) Mark Knowles (Canada) Daniel Nestor
- Score: 6–2, 7–6^{(10–8)}

Details
- Draw: 24 (2WC)
- Seeds: 8

Events
| Singles | Doubles |
- Hamburg Masters

Jonas Björkman and Max Mirnyi were the defending champions, but lost in quarterfinals to Fabrice Santoro and Nenad Zimonjić.

Paul Hanley and Kevin Ullyett won the title, defeating Mark Knowles and Daniel Nestor 6–2, 7–6^{(10–8)} in the final.

== Seeds ==
All seeds received a bye into the second round.

1. (United States) Bob Bryan / (United States) Mike Bryan (semifinals)
2. (Sweden) Jonas Björkman / (Belarus) Max Mirnyi (quarterfinals)
3. (The Bahamas) Mark Knowles / (Canada) Daniel Nestor (final)
4. (Australia) Paul Hanley / (Zimbabwe) Kevin Ullyett (champions)
5. (France) Fabrice Santoro / (Serbia and Montenegro) Nenad Zimonjić (semifinals)
6. (Israel) Jonathan Erlich / (Israel) Andy Ram (quarterfinals)
7. (Sweden) Simon Aspelin / (Australia) Todd Perry (quarterfinals)
8. (Czech Republic) Leoš Friedl / (Czech Republic) Pavel Vízner (quarterfinals)

== Draw ==
Key

- Q = Qualifier
- WC = Wild card
- LL = Lucky loser
- Alt = Alternate
- ITF = ITF entry
- PR = Protected ranking
- SR = Special ranking
- SE = Special exempt
- JE = Junior exempt
- JR = Junior Accelerator Programme entrant
- CO = College Accelerator Programme entrant
- NG = Next Gen Accelerator Program entrant
- w/o = Walkover
- r = Retired
- d = Defaulted

=== Finals ===
Semifinals
1 | (United States) Bob Bryan (United States) Mike Bryan | 6 | 6^{5} | [5]
3 | (The Bahamas) Mark Knowles (Canada) Daniel Nestor | 4 | 7^{7} | [10]
4 | (Australia) Paul Hanley (Zimbabwe) Kevin Ullyett | 6 | 7
5 | (France) Fabrice Santoro (Serbia and Montenegro) Nenad Zimonjić | 4 | 5

Final
3 | (The Bahamas) Mark Knowles (Canada) Daniel Nestor | 2 | 6^{8}
4 | (Australia) Paul Hanley (Zimbabwe) Kevin Ullyett | 6 | 7^{10}

=== Top half ===
First round
(Spain) D Ferrer (Spain) T Robredo | 6 | 3 | [5]
(South Africa) C Haggard (South Africa) W Moodie | 1 | 6 | [10]
(Chile) F González (Chile) N Massú | 3 | 3
(United States) J Blake (Belgium) X Malisse | 6 | 6
(Slovakia) D Hrbatý (Argentina) S Prieto | 3 | 3
(Austria) J Knowle (Austria) J Melzer | 6 | 6
(Czech Republic) T Berdych (Czech Republic) J Levinský | 6 | 2 | [5]
WC | (Germany) T Haas (Germany) A Waske | 3 | 6 | [10]

Second round
1 | (United States) B Bryan (United States) M Bryan | 6 | 6
(South Africa) C Haggard (South Africa) W Moodie | 4 | 4
(United States) J Blake (Belgium) X Malisse
8 | (Czech Republic) L Friedl (Czech Republic) P Vízner | w/o
3 | (The Bahamas) M Knowles (Canada) D Nestor | 6^{4} | 6 | [10]
(Austria) J Knowle (Austria) J Melzer | 7^{7} | 2 | [3]
WC | (Germany) T Haas (Germany) A Waske
7 | (Sweden) S Aspelin (Australia) T Perry | w/o

Quarterfinals
1 | (United States) B Bryan (United States) M Bryan | 6 | 6
8 | (Czech Republic) L Friedl (Czech Republic) P Vízner | 3 | 2
3 | (The Bahamas) M Knowles (Canada) D Nestor | 6 | 6
7 | (Sweden) S Aspelin (Australia) T Perry | 2 | 3

Semifinals
1 | (United States) B Bryan (United States) M Bryan | 6 | 6^{5} | [5]
3 | (The Bahamas) M Knowles (Canada) D Nestor | 4 | 7^{7} | [10]

=== Bottom half ===
First round
(Sweden) T Johansson (Croatia) I Ljubičić | 2 | 2
(France) M Llodra (Belgium) O Rochus | 6 | 6
(India) M Bhupathi (United States) R Ginepri | 4 | 6^{2}
WC | (Germany) M Kohlmann (Germany) R Schüttler | 6 | 7^{7}
(Argentina) J Acasuso (Argentina) G Gaudio | 6^{6} | 2
(Poland) M Fyrstenberg (Poland) M Matkowski | 7^{8} | 6
(Sweden) R Lindstedt (Finland) J Nieminen | 4 | 7^{8} | [10]
(Czech Republic) M Damm (Czech Republic) C Suk | 6 | 6^{6} | [5]

Second round
6 | (Israel) J Erlich (Israel) A Ram | 6 | 3 | [10]
(France) M Llodra (Belgium) O Rochus | 1 | 6 | [5]
WC | (Germany) M Kohlmann (Germany) R Schüttler | 6^{5} | 4
4 | (Australia) P Hanley (Zimbabwe) K Ullyett | 7^{7} | 6
5 | (France) F Santoro (Serbia and Montenegro) N Zimonjić | 4 | 7^{7} | [10]
(Poland) M Fyrstenberg (Poland) M Matkowski | 6 | 6^{5} | [4]
(Sweden) R Lindstedt (Finland) J Nieminen | 4 | 1
2 | (Sweden) J Björkman (Belarus) M Mirnyi | 6 | 6

Quarterfinals
6 | (Israel) J Erlich (Israel) A Ram | 6 | 1 | [6]
4 | (Australia) P Hanley (Zimbabwe) K Ullyett | 3 | 6 | [10]
5 | (France) F Santoro (Serbia and Montenegro) N Zimonjić | 6 | 7
2 | (Sweden) J Björkman (Belarus) M Mirnyi | 4 | 5

Semifinals
4 | (Australia) P Hanley (Zimbabwe) K Ullyett | 6 | 7
5 | (France) F Santoro (Serbia and Montenegro) N Zimonjić | 4 | 5
