= 2006 Western & Southern Financial Group Masters =

Tennis tournament

2006 Western & Southern Financial Group Masters and Western & Southern Financial Group Women's Open
- Date: August 14 – August 21 (men); July 17 – July 23 (women)
- Edition: 105th
- Surface: Hard / Outdoor
- Location: Mason, United States
- Venue: Lindner Family Tennis Center

Champions

Men's singles
- (United States) Andy Roddick

Women's singles
- (Russia) Vera Zvonareva

Men's doubles
- (Sweden) Jonas Björkman / (Belarus) Max Mirnyi

Women's doubles
- (Italy) Maria Elena Camerin / (Argentina) Gisela Dulko
- Western & Southern Financial Group Masters Western & Southern Financial Group Women's Open

The 2006 Cincinnati Masters (also known as the Western & Southern Financial Group Masters and Western & Southern Financial Group Women's Open for sponsorship reasons) was a tennis tournament played on outdoor hard courts. It was the 105th edition of the Cincinnati Masters, and was part of the ATP Masters Series of the 2006 ATP Tour, and of the Tier III Series of the 2006 WTA Tour. Both the men's and the women's events took place at the Lindner Family Tennis Center in Mason, near Cincinnati, Ohio, United States, with the men playing from August 14 through August 21, 2006, and the women from July 17 through July 23, 2006.

The men's singles were led by World No. 1, Australian Open and Wimbledon and 2006 U.S. Open champion, and 6-times Masters Series finalist in 2006, Roger Federer, French Open winner Rafael Nadal, and ATP No. 3. Other players competing included Nikolay Davydenko, David Nalbandian, Andy Murray and home favourites Andy Roddick and James Blake.

== Finals ==
=== Men's singles ===
(United States) Andy Roddick defeated (Spain) Juan Carlos Ferrero 6–3, 6–4

- It was only Andy Roddick's 1st title of the year, but his 21st overall. It was his 1st Masters title of the year, his 4th overall, and his 2nd win at the event, after 2003.

=== Women's singles ===
(Russia) Vera Zvonareva defeated (Slovenia) Katarina Srebotnik 6–2, 6–4

- It was Vera Zvonareva's 3rd title of the year, and her 8th overall.

=== Men's doubles ===
(Sweden) Jonas Björkman / (Belarus) Max Mirnyi defeated (United States) Bob Bryan / (United States) Mike Bryan 3–6, 6–3, [10–7]

=== Women's doubles ===
(Italy) Maria Elena Camerin / (Argentina) Gisela Dulko defeated (Poland) Marta Domachowska / (India) Sania Mirza 6–4, 3–6, 6–2
