= 2006 If Stockholm Open =

- Date: 9–15 October
- Edition: 38th
- Category: International Series
- Draw: 32S / 16D
- Prize money: $775,000
- Surface: Hard / indoor
- Location: Stockholm, Sweden
- Venue: Kungliga tennishallen

Champions

Singles
- (United States) James Blake

Doubles
- (Australia) Paul Hanley / (Zimbabwe) Kevin Ullyett
← 2005 ·	Stockholm Open	· 2007 →

The 2006 If Stockholm Open was an ATP men's tennis tournament played on hard courts and held at the Kungliga tennishallen in Stockholm, Sweden. It was the 38th edition of the event and part of the ATP International Series of the 2006 ATP Tour. The tournament was held from 9 October through 15 October 2006. Second-seeded James Blake won his second consecutive singles title at the event.

== Finals ==
=== Singles ===
(United States) James Blake defeated (Finland) Jarkko Nieminen, 6–4, 6–2

- It was Blake's 5th singles title of the year and the 8th of his career.

=== Doubles ===
(Australia) Paul Hanley / (Zimbabwe) Kevin Ullyett defeated (Belgium) Olivier Rochus / (Belgium) Kristof Vliegen, 7–6^{(7–2)}, 6–4
