= 2006 BA-CA-TennisTrophy =

- Date: 9–15 October
- Edition: 32nd
- Category: International Series Gold
- Surface: Hard / indoor
- Location: Vienna, Austria
- Venue: Wiener Stadthalle

Champions

Singles
- (Croatia) Ivan Ljubičić

Doubles
- (Czech Republic) Petr Pála / (Czech Republic) Pavel Vízner
- Vienna Open

The 2006 BA-CA-TennisTrophy was a men's tennis tournament played on indoor hard courts. It was the 32nd edition of the event known that year as the BA-CA-TennisTrophy, and was part of the International Series Gold of the 2006 ATP Tour. It took place at the Wiener Stadthalle in Vienna, Austria, from 9 October through 15 October 2006. First-seeded Ivan Ljubičić won his second consecutive singles title at the event.

== Finals ==
=== Singles ===
(Croatia) Ivan Ljubičić defeated (Chile) Fernando González, 6–3, 6–4, 7–5

- It was Ivan Ljubičić's 3rd title of the year, and his 6th overall.

=== Doubles ===
(Czech Republic) Petr Pála / (Czech Republic) Pavel Vízner defeated (Austria) Julian Knowle / (Austria) Jürgen Melzer, 6–4, 3–6, [12–10]
