= 2006 Rogers Cup =

- Date: August 7–13 (men); August 14–20 (women)
- Edition: 117th (men) / 105th (women)
- Surface: Hard / outdoor

Champions

Men's singles
- (Switzerland) Roger Federer

Women's singles
- (Serbia) Ana Ivanovic

Men's doubles
- (United States) Mike Bryan / (United States) Bob Bryan

Women's doubles
- (Russia) Nadia Petrova / (United States) Martina Navratilova
- Canadian Open

The 2006 Canadian Open (also known as the 2006 Rogers Masters and 2006 Rogers Cup for sponsorship reasons) was a tennis tournament played on outdoor hard courts. It was the 117th edition of the Canadian Open, and was part of the ATP Masters Series of the 2006 ATP Tour, and of the Tier I Series of the 2006 WTA Tour. The men's event took place at the Rexall Centre in Toronto, Ontario, Canada, from August 7 through August 13, 2006, and the women's event at the Uniprix Stadium in Montreal, Quebec, Canada, from August 14 through August 20, 2006.

The men's field featured World No. 1, Australian Open and Wimbledon winner Roger Federer, French Open champion and 2005 Canada Masters winner Rafael Nadal, and ATP No. 3 David Nalbandian. Others top seeds competing were Miami Masters runner-up Ivan Ljubičić, Indianapolis champion and Indian Wells finalist James Blake, Nikolay Davydenko, Tommy Robredo and Marcos Baghdatis.

The women's draw was headlined by WTA No. 1 and Stanford winner Kim Clijsters, Charleston and Berlin champion Nadia Petrova, and Miami winner Svetlana Kuznetsova. Other seeds present were Strasbourg winner Nicole Vaidišová, Stockholm runner-up Anastasia Myskina, Martina Hingis, Francesca Schiavone and Dinara Safina.

== Finals ==
=== Men's singles ===
(Switzerland) Roger Federer defeated (France) Richard Gasquet 2–6, 6–3, 6–2

- It was Roger Federer's 6th title of the year, and his 40th overall. It was his 3rd Masters title of the year, his 11th overall, and his 2nd win at the event.

=== Women's singles ===
(Serbia) Ana Ivanovic defeated (Switzerland) Martina Hingis 6–2, 6–3

- It was Ana Ivanovic's 1st title of the year, and her 2nd overall. It was her 1st career Tier I title.

=== Men's doubles ===
(United States) Bob Bryan / (United States) Mike Bryan defeated (Australia) Paul Hanley / (Zimbabwe) Kevin Ullyett 6–3, 7–5

=== Women's doubles ===
(Russia) Nadia Petrova / (United States) Martina Navratilova defeated (Zimbabwe) Cara Black / (Germany) Anna-Lena Grönefeld 6–1, 6–2
