= 2006 Monte Carlo Masters =

- Date: 17–23 April
- Edition: 100th
- Category: ATP Masters Series
- Draw: 64S / 24D
- Prize money: $2,220,000
- Surface: Clay / outdoor
- Location: Roquebrune-Cap-Martin, France
- Venue: Monte Carlo Country Club

Champions

Singles
- (Spain) Rafael Nadal

Doubles
- (Sweden) Jonas Björkman / (Belarus) Max Mirnyi
| ← 2005 · | Monte Carlo Masters | · 2007 → |

The 2006 Monte Carlo Masters was a men's tennis tournament played on outdoor clay courts. It was the 100th edition of the Monte Carlo Masters and was part of the ATP Masters Series of the 2006 ATP Tour. It took place at the Monte Carlo Country Club in Roquebrune-Cap-Martin, France from 17 April through 23 April 2006.

The men's singles was headlined by world No. 1 Roger Federer, Rafael Nadal and David Nalbandian. Second-seeded Rafael Nadal won the singles title.

== Finals ==
=== Singles ===
(Spain) Rafael Nadal defeated (Switzerland) Roger Federer 6–2, 6–7^{(2–7)}, 6–3, 7–6^{(7–5)}

=== Doubles ===
(Sweden) Jonas Björkman / (Belarus) Max Mirnyi defeated (France) Fabrice Santoro / (Serbia and Montenegro) Nenad Zimonjić 6–2, 7–6^{(7–2)}
