= 2006 Italian Open (tennis) =

- Date: 8–14 May (men); 15-22 May (women)
- Edition: 63rd
- Surface: Clay / outdoor
- Location: Rome, Italy
- Venue: Foro Italico

Champions

Men's singles
- (Spain) Rafael Nadal

Women's singles
- (Switzerland) Martina Hingis

Men's doubles
- (The Bahamas) Mark Knowles / (Canada) Daniel Nestor

Women's doubles
- (Slovakia) Daniela Hantuchová / (Japan) Ai Sugiyama
- Italian Open

The 2006 Italian Open (also known as 2006 Rome Masters and the 2006 Internazionali d'Italia) was a tennis tournament played on clay courts. It was the 63rd edition of the Italian Open and was part of the ATP Masters Series of the 2006 ATP Tour and of the Tier I Series of the 2006 WTA Tour. It took place at the Foro Italico in Rome, Italy from 8 May through 22 May 2006.

== Review ==
The men's tournament was won by Rafael Nadal with a five-set victory against the Swiss top seed Roger Federer. The women's draw was won by Swiss player, Martina Hingis, who prevailed 6–2, 7–5, against Dinara Safina.

Daniela Hantuchová and Ai Sugiyama were victorious in the women's doubles, beating Francesca Schiavone and Květa Peschke, while third seeds Mark Knowles and Daniel Nestor beat sixth seeds Jonathan Erlich and Andy Ram in the final of the men's doubles.

== Finals ==
=== Men's singles ===
(Spain) Rafael Nadal defeated (Switzerland) Roger Federer 6–7^{(0–7)}, 7–6^{(7–5)}, 6–4, 2–6, 7–6^{(7–5)}

=== Women's singles ===
(Switzerland) Martina Hingis defeated (Russia) Dinara Safina 6–2, 7–5

=== Men's doubles ===
(The Bahamas) Mark Knowles / (Canada) Daniel Nestor defeated (Israel) Jonathan Erlich / (Israel) Andy Ram 6–4, 5–7, [13–11]

=== Women's doubles ===
(Slovakia) Daniela Hantuchová / (Japan) Ai Sugiyama defeated (Italy) Francesca Schiavone and (Czech Republic) Květa Peschke 3–6, 6–3, 6–1
