= 2006 NASDAQ-100 Open =

- Date: March 20 – April 2
- Edition: 22nd
- Category: ATP Masters Series (men); Tier I Series (women)
- Surface: Hard / outdoor
- Location: Key Biscayne, Florida, U.S.
- Venue: Tennis Center at Crandon Park

Champions

Men's singles
- (Switzerland) Roger Federer

Women's singles
- (Russia) Svetlana Kuznetsova

Men's doubles
- (Sweden) Jonas Björkman / (Belarus) Max Mirnyi

Women's doubles
- (United States) Lisa Raymond / (Australia) Samantha Stosur
← 2005 ·	Miami Open	· 2007 →

The 2006 NASDAQ-100 Open was the 22nd edition of this tennis tournament and was played on outdoor hard courts. The tournament was part of the ATP Masters Series of the 2006 ATP Tour and was classified as a Tier I event on the 2006 WTA Tour. Both the men's and the women's events took place at the Tennis Center at Crandon Park in Key Biscayne, Florida, United States, from March 20 through April 2, 2006.

== Finals ==
=== Men's singles ===
(Switzerland) Roger Federer defeated (Croatia) Ivan Ljubičić 7–6^{(7–5)}, 7–6^{(7–4)}, 7–6^{(8–6)}

=== Women's singles ===
(Russia) Svetlana Kuznetsova defeated (Russia) Maria Sharapova 6–4, 6–3

=== Men's doubles ===
(Sweden) Jonas Björkman & (Belarus) Max Mirnyi defeated (United States) Bob Bryan & (United States) Mike Bryan 6–4, 6–4

=== Women's doubles ===
(United States) Lisa Raymond & (Australia) Samantha Stosur defeated (South Africa) Liezel Huber & (United States) Martina Navratilova 6–4, 7–5
