= 2006 Pacific Life Open =

- Date: March 6–19
- Edition: 33rd
- Category: Masters Series (ATP); Tier I Series (WTA)
- Prize money: $2,919,600
- Surface: Hard / outdoor
- Location: Indian Wells, California, US
- Venue: Indian Wells Tennis Garden

Champions

Men's singles
- (Switzerland) Roger Federer

Women's singles
- (Russia) Maria Sharapova

Men's doubles
- (The Bahamas) Mark Knowles / (Canada) Daniel Nestor

Women's doubles
- (United States) Lisa Raymond / (Australia) Samantha Stosur
- Indian Wells Open

The 2006 Indian Wells Open (also known as the Pacific Life Open for sponsorship reasons) was a joint ATP Tour and WTA Tour tournament that took place on the hard courts of the Indian Wells Tennis Garden in Indian Wells, California. It was the 33rd edition of the tournament and took place from March 6 to March 19. The event was part of the upper echelon of both the women's and men's tours, as part of the ATP Masters Series and the WTA Tier I events respectively.

Roger Federer won his third consecutive title at Indian Wells, a feat that no other player had achieved until that point.

== Finals ==
=== Men's singles ===
(Switzerland) Roger Federer defeated (United States) James Blake 7–5, 6–3, 6–0

=== Women's singles ===
(Russia) Maria Sharapova defeated (Russia) Elena Dementieva 6–1, 6–2

=== Men's doubles ===
(The Bahamas) Mark Knowles / (Canada) Daniel Nestor defeated (United States) Bob Bryan / (United States) Mike Bryan 6–4, 6–4

=== Women's doubles ===
(United States) Lisa Raymond / (Australia) Samantha Stosur defeated (Spain) Virginia Ruano Pascual / (United States) Meghann Shaughnessy 6–2, 7–5
