= 2006 Rafael Nadal tennis season =

Statistics for Spanish tennis player

- Full name: Rafael Nadal Parera
- Country: Spain
- Calendar prize money: $3,746,360 (Singles $3,732,760, Doubles $13,600)

Singles
- Season record: 59–12
- Calendar titles: 5
- Year-end ranking: No. 2
- Ranking change from previous year: Steady

Grand Slam & significant results
- Australian Open: DNS
- French Open: W
- Wimbledon: F
- US Open: QF

Injuries
- Injuries: Knee injury

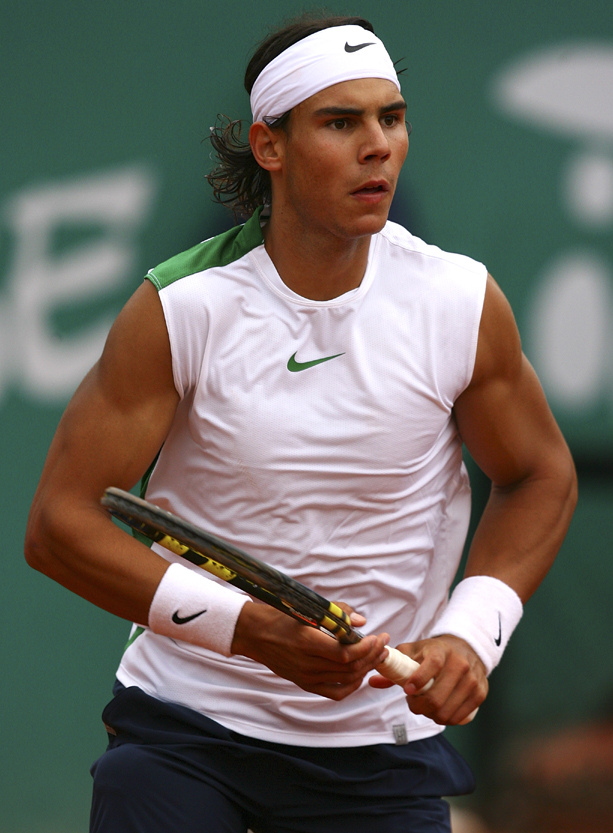
Nadal in 2006

The 2006 Rafael Nadal tennis season started in February as Nadal missed the Australian Open because of a foot injury. Nadal won five singles titles in 2006.

== Hard court ==
In February, Nadal lost in the semifinals of the first tournament he played, the Open 13 tournament in Marseille, France. Two weeks later, he handed Roger Federer his first loss of the year in the final of the Dubai Tennis Championships (in 2006, Rafael Nadal and Andy Murray were the only two men who defeated Federer), thus ending Federer's 56-match winning streak on hard courts. To complete the spring hard-court season, Nadal was upset in both the semifinals of the Indian Wells Masters by James Blake, and in the second round of the Miami Masters by Carlos Moyá, who thus ended Nadal's 22-match win streak over fellow Spaniard players.

== Clay season ==
On European clay, Nadal won all four tournaments he entered and 24 consecutive matches. He defeated Federer in the final of the Monte Carlo Masters in four sets. The following week, he defeated Tommy Robredo in the final of the Open Sabadell Atlántico tournament in Barcelona. After a one-week break, Nadal won the Italian Masters, defeating Federer in a fifth-set tiebreaker in the final, after saving two match points and equaling Björn Borg's tally of 16 ATP titles won as a teenager. Nadal broke Argentinian Guillermo Vilas's 29-year male record of 53 consecutive clay-court match victories by beating Robin Söderling in the first round of the French Open. Vilas presented Nadal with a trophy, but commented later that Nadal's feat was less impressive than his own because Nadal's winning streak covered two years and was accomplished by adding easy tournaments to his schedule.

Nadal went on to face Novak Djokovic in the quarterfinals, the first-ever meeting of their historic rivalry, which Nadal won via a retirement from Djokovic after Nadal took the first two sets. He then beat Ivan Ljubičić to set up a final against Federer. The first two sets of the match were hardly competitive, as the rivals traded 6–1 sets. Nadal won the third set easily and served for the match in the fourth set before Federer broke him and forced a tiebreaker. Nadal won the tiebreaker and became the first player to defeat Federer in a Grand Slam tournament final.

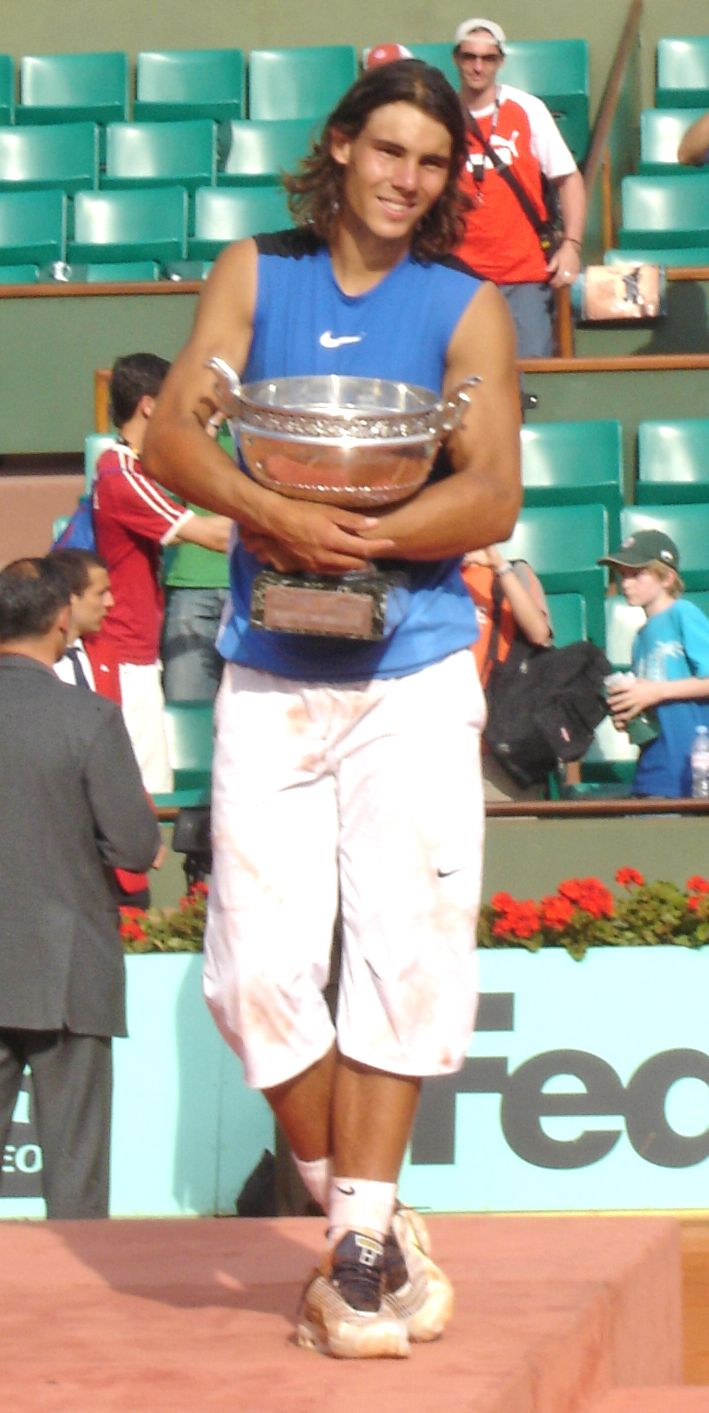
2006 Roland Garros champion

Nadal injured his shoulder while playing a quarterfinal match against Lleyton Hewitt at the Artois Championships, played on grass at the Queen's Club in London. Nadal was unable to complete the match, which ended his 26-match winning streak.

== Wimbledon ==
Nadal was seeded second at Wimbledon, but was two points from defeat against American qualifier Robert Kendrick in the second round before coming back to win in five sets. In the third round, Nadal defeated world No. 20 Andre Agassi in straight sets in Agassi's last career match at Wimbledon. Nadal also won his next three matches in straight sets, which set up his first Wimbledon final, which was against Federer, who had won this tournament the three previous years. Nadal was the first Spanish man since Manuel Santana in 1966, to reach the Wimbledon final, but Federer won the match in four sets to win his fourth consecutive Wimbledon title.

== US Open Series ==
During the lead up to the US Open, Nadal played the two Masters Series tournaments in North America. He was upset in the third round of the Rogers Cup in Toronto and in the quarterfinals of the Cincinnati Masters by Juan Carlos Ferrero. Nadal was seeded second at the US Open, but lost in the quarterfinals to world No. 54 Mikhail Youzhny of Russia in four sets.

Nadal played only three tournaments for the remainder of the year. Joachim Johansson, ranked world No. 690, upset Nadal in the second round of the Stockholm Open. The following week, Nadal lost to Tomáš Berdych in the quarterfinals of the year's last Masters Series tournament, the Madrid Masters. During the round-robin stage of the year-ending Tennis Masters Cup, Nadal lost to James Blake but defeated Nikolay Davydenko and Robredo. Because of those two victories, Nadal qualified for the semifinals, where he lost to Federer. This was Nadal's third loss in nine career matches with Federer.

== Singles matches ==
Tournament	Match	Round	Opponent	Rank	Result	Score
Open 13; Marseille, France; ATP World Tour 250; Hard, indoor 13–19 February 2006	1 / 164	1R	(Belgium) Olivier Rochus	30	Win	4–6, 6–2, 7–5
Open 13; Marseille, France; ATP World Tour 250; Hard, indoor 13–19 February 2006	2 / 165	2R	(France) Gilles Simon	80	Win	7–5, 6–4
Open 13; Marseille, France; ATP World Tour 250; Hard, indoor 13–19 February 2006	3 / 166	QF	(France) Paul-Henri Mathieu	35	Win	7–5, 6–4
Open 13; Marseille, France; ATP World Tour 250; Hard, indoor 13–19 February 2006	4 / 167	SF	(France) Arnaud Clément	65	Loss	6–2, 3–6, 5–7
Dubai Tennis Championships; Dubai, U. A. E. ATP World Tour 500; Hard, outdoor 27 February – 5 March 2006	5 / 168	1R	(France) Paul-Henri Mathieu	34	Win	6–7^{(5–7)}, 6–1, 6–2
Dubai Tennis Championships; Dubai, U. A. E. ATP World Tour 500; Hard, outdoor 27 February – 5 March 2006	–	2R	(Morocco) Younes El Aynaoui	211	Win	(W/O)
Dubai Tennis Championships; Dubai, U. A. E. ATP World Tour 500; Hard, outdoor 27 February – 5 March 2006	6 / 169	QF	(United Kingdom) Tim Henman	49	Win	7–6^{(7–1)}, 6–1
Dubai Tennis Championships; Dubai, U. A. E. ATP World Tour 500; Hard, outdoor 27 February – 5 March 2006	7 / 170	SF	(Germany) Rainer Schüttler	98	Win	6–4, 6–2
Dubai Tennis Championships; Dubai, U. A. E. ATP World Tour 500; Hard, outdoor 27 February – 5 March 2006	8 / 171	W	(Switzerland) Roger Federer	1	Win (1)	2–6, 6–4, 6–4
Pacific Life Open; Indian Wells, United States; ATP World Tour Masters 1000; Hard, outdoor 6–19 March 2006	–	1R	Bye			
Pacific Life Open; Indian Wells, United States; ATP World Tour Masters 1000; Hard, outdoor 6–19 March 2006	9 / 172	2R	(Czech Republic) Jan Hernych	87	Win	6–4, 6–4
Pacific Life Open; Indian Wells, United States; ATP World Tour Masters 1000; Hard, outdoor 6–19 March 2006	10 / 173	3R	(United States) Mardy Fish	294	Win	6–1, 6–4
Pacific Life Open; Indian Wells, United States; ATP World Tour Masters 1000; Hard, outdoor 6–19 March 2006	11 / 174	4R	(France) Sébastien Grosjean	22	Win	6–4, 6–2
Pacific Life Open; Indian Wells, United States; ATP World Tour Masters 1000; Hard, outdoor 6–19 March 2006	12 / 175	QF	(Cyprus) Marcos Baghdatis	27	Win	7–5, 6–0
Pacific Life Open; Indian Wells, United States; ATP World Tour Masters 1000; Hard, outdoor 6–19 March 2006	13 / 176	SF	(United States) James Blake	14	Loss	5–7, 3–6
Sony Ericsson Open; Miami, United States; ATP World Tour Masters 1000; Hard, outdoor 20 March – 2 April 2006	–	1R	Bye			
Sony Ericsson Open; Miami, United States; ATP World Tour Masters 1000; Hard, outdoor 20 March – 2 April 2006	14 / 177	2R	(Spain) Carlos Moyá	35	Loss	6–2, 1–6, 1–6
Monte Carlo Masters; Monte Carlo, Monaco; ATP World Tour Masters 1000; Clay, outdoor 15–23 April 2006	15 / 178	1R	(France) Arnaud Clément	56	Win	6–4, 6–4
Monte Carlo Masters; Monte Carlo, Monaco; ATP World Tour Masters 1000; Clay, outdoor 15–23 April 2006	16 / 179	2R	(Monaco) Jean-Rene Lisnard	154	Win	6–4, 6–1
Monte Carlo Masters; Monte Carlo, Monaco; ATP World Tour Masters 1000; Clay, outdoor 15–23 April 2006	17 / 180	3R	(Belgium) Kristof Vliegen	57	Win	6–3, 6–3
Monte Carlo Masters; Monte Carlo, Monaco; ATP World Tour Masters 1000; Clay, outdoor 15–23 April 2006	18 / 181	QF	(Argentina) Guillermo Coria	9	Win	6–2, 6–1
Monte Carlo Masters; Monte Carlo, Monaco; ATP World Tour Masters 1000; Clay, outdoor 15–23 April 2006	19 / 182	SF	(Argentina) Gastón Gaudio	8	Win	5–7, 6–1, 6–1
Monte Carlo Masters; Monte Carlo, Monaco; ATP World Tour Masters 1000; Clay, outdoor 15–23 April 2006	20 / 183	W	(Switzerland) Roger Federer	1	Win (2)	6–2, 6–7^{(2–7)}, 6–3, 7–6^{(7–5)}
Torneo Godo; Barcelona, Spain; ATP World Tour 500; Clay, outdoor 24–30 April 2006	–	1R	Bye			
Torneo Godo; Barcelona, Spain; ATP World Tour 500; Clay, outdoor 24–30 April 2006	21 / 184	2R	(Spain) Feliciano López	38	Win	6–4, 6–2
Torneo Godo; Barcelona, Spain; ATP World Tour 500; Clay, outdoor 24–30 April 2006	22 / 185	3R	(Spain) Iván Navarro	164	Win	6–4, 6–2
Torneo Godo; Barcelona, Spain; ATP World Tour 500; Clay, outdoor 24–30 April 2006	23 / 186	QF	(Finland) Jarkko Nieminen	16	Win	4–6, 6–4, 6–3
Torneo Godo; Barcelona, Spain; ATP World Tour 500; Clay, outdoor 24–30 April 2006	24 / 187	SF	(Spain) Nicolás Almagro	57	Win	7–6^{(7–2)}, 6–3
Torneo Godo; Barcelona, Spain; ATP World Tour 500; Clay, outdoor 24–30 April 2006	25 / 188	W	(Spain) Tommy Robredo	15	Win (3)	6–4, 6–4, 6–0
Internazionali BNL d'Italia; Rome, Italy; ATP World Tour Masters 1000; Clay, outdoor 8–14 May 2006	28 / 189	1R	(Spain) Carlos Moyá	33	Win	6–1, 2–6, 6–2
Internazionali BNL d'Italia; Rome, Italy; ATP World Tour Masters 1000; Clay, outdoor 8–14 May 2006	27 / 190	2R	(Italy) Filippo Volandri	46	Win	6–1, 6–2
Internazionali BNL d'Italia; Rome, Italy; ATP World Tour Masters 1000; Clay, outdoor 8–14 May 2006	28 / 191	3R	(United Kingdom) Tim Henman	70	Win	6–2, 6–2
Internazionali BNL d'Italia; Rome, Italy; ATP World Tour Masters 1000; Clay, outdoor 8–14 May 2006	29 / 192	QF	(Chile) Fernando González	9	Win	6–4, 6–3
Internazionali BNL d'Italia; Rome, Italy; ATP World Tour Masters 1000; Clay, outdoor 8–14 May 2006	30 / 193	SF	(France) Gaël Monfils	35	Win	6–2, 6–2
Internazionali BNL d'Italia; Rome, Italy; ATP World Tour Masters 1000; Clay, outdoor 8–14 May 2006	31 / 194	W	(Switzerland) Roger Federer	1	Win (4)	6–7^{(0–7)}, 7–6^{(7–5)}, 6–4, 2–6, 7–6^{(7–5)}
French Open; Paris, France; Grand Slam; Clay, outdoor 29 May – 11 June 2006	32 / 195	1R	(Sweden) Robin Söderling	50	Win	6–2, 7–5, 6–1
French Open; Paris, France; Grand Slam; Clay, outdoor 29 May – 11 June 2006	33 / 196	2R	(United States) Kevin Kim	116	Win	6–2, 6–1, 6–4
French Open; Paris, France; Grand Slam; Clay, outdoor 29 May – 11 June 2006	34 / 197	3R	(France) Paul-Henri Mathieu	32	Win	5–7, 6–4, 6–4, 6–4
French Open; Paris, France; Grand Slam; Clay, outdoor 29 May – 11 June 2006	35 / 198	4R	(Australia) Lleyton Hewitt	14	Win	6–2, 5–7, 6–4, 6–2
French Open; Paris, France; Grand Slam; Clay, outdoor 29 May – 11 June 2006	36 / 199	QF	(Serbia and Montenegro) Novak Djokovic	63	Win	6–4, 6–4 RET
French Open; Paris, France; Grand Slam; Clay, outdoor 29 May – 11 June 2006	37 / 200	SF	(Croatia) Ivan Ljubičić	4	Win	6–4, 6–2, 7–6^{(9–7)}
French Open; Paris, France; Grand Slam; Clay, outdoor 29 May – 11 June 2006	38 / 201	W	(Switzerland) Roger Federer	1	Win (5)	1–6, 6–1, 6–4, 7–6^{(7–4)}
Stella Artois Championships; London, United Kingdom; ATP World Tour 250; Grass, outdoor 12–18 June 2006	–	1R	Bye			
Stella Artois Championships; London, United Kingdom; ATP World Tour 250; Grass, outdoor 12–18 June 2006	39 / 202	2R	(United States) Mardy Fish	86	Win	7–6^{(7–1)}, 6–1
Stella Artois Championships; London, United Kingdom; ATP World Tour 250; Grass, outdoor 12–18 June 2006	40 / 203	3R	(Spain) Fernando Verdasco	30	Win	2–6, 7–6^{(7–3)}, 7–6^{(7–3)}
Stella Artois Championships; London, United Kingdom; ATP World Tour 250; Grass, outdoor 12–18 June 2006	41 / 204	QF	(Australia) Lleyton Hewitt	13	Loss	6–3, 3–6 RET
The Championships, Wimbledon; Wimbledon, United Kingdom; Grand Slam; Grass, outdoor 26 June – 9 July 2006	42 / 205	1R	(United Kingdom) Alex Bogdanovic	135	Win	6–4, 7–6^{(7–3)}, 6–4
The Championships, Wimbledon; Wimbledon, United Kingdom; Grand Slam; Grass, outdoor 26 June – 9 July 2006	43 / 206	2R	(United States) Robert Kendrick	237	Win	6–7^{(4–7)}, 3–6, 7–6^{(7–2)}, 7–5, 6–4
The Championships, Wimbledon; Wimbledon, United Kingdom; Grand Slam; Grass, outdoor 26 June – 9 July 2006	44 / 207	3R	(United States) Andre Agassi	20	Win	7–6^{(7–5)}, 6–2, 6–4
The Championships, Wimbledon; Wimbledon, United Kingdom; Grand Slam; Grass, outdoor 26 June – 9 July 2006	45 / 208	4R	(Georgia (country)) Irakli Labadze	166	Win	6–3, 7–6^{(7–4)}, 6–3
The Championships, Wimbledon; Wimbledon, United Kingdom; Grand Slam; Grass, outdoor 26 June – 9 July 2006	46 / 209	QF	(Finland) Jarkko Nieminen	18	Win	6–3, 6–4, 6–4
The Championships, Wimbledon; Wimbledon, United Kingdom; Grand Slam; Grass, outdoor 26 June – 9 July 2006	47 / 210	SF	(Cyprus) Marcos Baghdatis	16	Win	6–1, 7–5, 6–3
The Championships, Wimbledon; Wimbledon, United Kingdom; Grand Slam; Grass, outdoor 26 June – 9 July 2006	48 / 211	F	(Switzerland) Roger Federer	1	Loss (1)	0–6, 6–7^{(5–7)}, 7–6^{(7–2)}, 3–6
Rogers Cup; Montreal, Canada; ATP World Tour Masters 1000; Hard, outdoor 7–13 August 2006	49 / 212	1R	(Chile) Nicolás Massú	38	Win	6–3, 6–2
Rogers Cup; Montreal, Canada; ATP World Tour Masters 1000; Hard, outdoor 7–13 August 2006	50 / 213	2R	(South Korea) Hyung-Taik Lee	85	Win	6–4, 6–3
Rogers Cup; Montreal, Canada; ATP World Tour Masters 1000; Hard, outdoor 7–13 August 2006	51 / 214	3R	(Czech Republic) Tomáš Berdych	14	Loss	1–6, 6–3, 2–6
Western & Southern Financial Group Masters; Cincinnati, United States; ATP World Tour Masters 1000; Hard, outdoor 14–20 August 2006	52 / 215	1R	(United States) Sam Querrey	178	Win	6–7^{(5–7)}, 6–2, 6–3
Western & Southern Financial Group Masters; Cincinnati, United States; ATP World Tour Masters 1000; Hard, outdoor 14–20 August 2006	53 / 216	2R	(South Korea) Hyung-Taik Lee	73	Win	6–4, 6–3
Western & Southern Financial Group Masters; Cincinnati, United States; ATP World Tour Masters 1000; Hard, outdoor 14–20 August 2006	54 / 217	3R	(Germany) Tommy Haas	17	Win	7–6^{(7–5)}, 6–3
Western & Southern Financial Group Masters; Cincinnati, United States; ATP World Tour Masters 1000; Hard, outdoor 14–20 August 2006	55 / 218	QF	(Spain) Juan Carlos Ferrero	31	Loss	6–7^{(2–7)}, 6–7^{(3–7)}
US Open; New York, USA; Grand Slam; Hard, outdoor 28 August – 10 September 2006	56 / 219	1R	(Australia) Mark Phillipoussis	113	Win	6–4, 6–4, 6–4
US Open; New York, USA; Grand Slam; Hard, outdoor 28 August – 10 September 2006	57 / 220	2R	(Peru) Luis Horna	61	Win	6–4, 4–6, 6–4, 6–2
US Open; New York, USA; Grand Slam; Hard, outdoor 28 August – 10 September 2006	58 / 221	3R	(South Africa) Wesley Moodie	82	Win	6–4, 7–6^{(7–4)}, 7–6^{(7–5)}
US Open; New York, USA; Grand Slam; Hard, outdoor 28 August – 10 September 2006	59 / 222	4R	(Czech Republic) Jiří Novák	179	Win	6–1, 7–6^{(7–3)}, 6–4
US Open; New York, USA; Grand Slam; Hard, outdoor 28 August – 10 September 2006	60 / 223	QF	(Russia) Mikhail Youzhny	54	Loss	3–6, 7–5, 6–7^{(5–7)}, 1–6
Davis Cup, ITA v/s ESP World Group Play Offs; Spain; Davis Cup; Clay, outdoor 22–24 September 2006	61 / 224	RR	(Italy) Andreas Seppi	69	Win	6–0, 6–4, 6–3
Davis Cup, ITA v/s ESP World Group Play Offs; Spain; Davis Cup; Clay, outdoor 22–24 September 2006	62 / 225	RR	(Italy) Filippo Volandri	38	Win	3–6, 7–5, 6–3, 6–3
If Stockholm Open; Stockholm, Sweden; ATP World Tour 250; Hard, indoor 9–15 October 2006	63 / 226	1R	(Netherlands) Raemon Sluiter	90	Win	6–4, 6–2
If Stockholm Open; Stockholm, Sweden; ATP World Tour 250; Hard, indoor 9–15 October 2006	64 / 227	2R	(Sweden) Joachim Johansson	690	Loss	4–6, 6–7^{(4–7)}
Mutua Madrileña Masters Madrid; Madrid, Spain; ATP World Tour Masters 1000; Hard, indoor 16–22 October 2006	–	1R	Bye			
Mutua Madrileña Masters Madrid; Madrid, Spain; ATP World Tour Masters 1000; Hard, indoor 16–22 October 2006	65 / 228	2R	(United States) Mardy Fish	54	Win	6–4, 6–2
Mutua Madrileña Masters Madrid; Madrid, Spain; ATP World Tour Masters 1000; Hard, indoor 16–22 October 2006	66 / 229	3R	(Germany) Tommy Haas	13	Win	6–4, 6–3
Mutua Madrileña Masters Madrid; Madrid, Spain; ATP World Tour Masters 1000; Hard, indoor 16–22 October 2006	67 / 230	QF	(Czech Republic) Tomáš Berdych	11	Loss	3–6, 6–7^{(6–8)}
Tennis Masters Cup; Shanghai, China; Year-end Championships; Hard, indoor 13–19 November 2006	68 / 231	RR	(United States) James Blake	8	Loss	4–6, 6–7^{(0–7)}
Tennis Masters Cup; Shanghai, China; Year-end Championships; Hard, indoor 13–19 November 2006	69 / 232	RR	(Spain) Tommy Robredo	6	Win	7–6^{(7–2)}, 6–2
Tennis Masters Cup; Shanghai, China; Year-end Championships; Hard, indoor 13–19 November 2006	70 / 233	RR	(Russia) Nikolay Davydenko	3	Win	5–7, 6–4, 6–4
Tennis Masters Cup; Shanghai, China; Year-end Championships; Hard, indoor 13–19 November 2006	71 / 234	SF	(Switzerland) Roger Federer	1	Loss	4–6, 5–7

== Year end ranking ==
Nadal went on to become the first player since Andre Agassi in 1994–95 to finish the year as the world No. 2 in consecutive years.

== See also ==
- 2006 ATP Tour
- 2006 Roger Federer tennis season
