= 2006 Roger Federer tennis season =

Statistics for Swiss tennis player

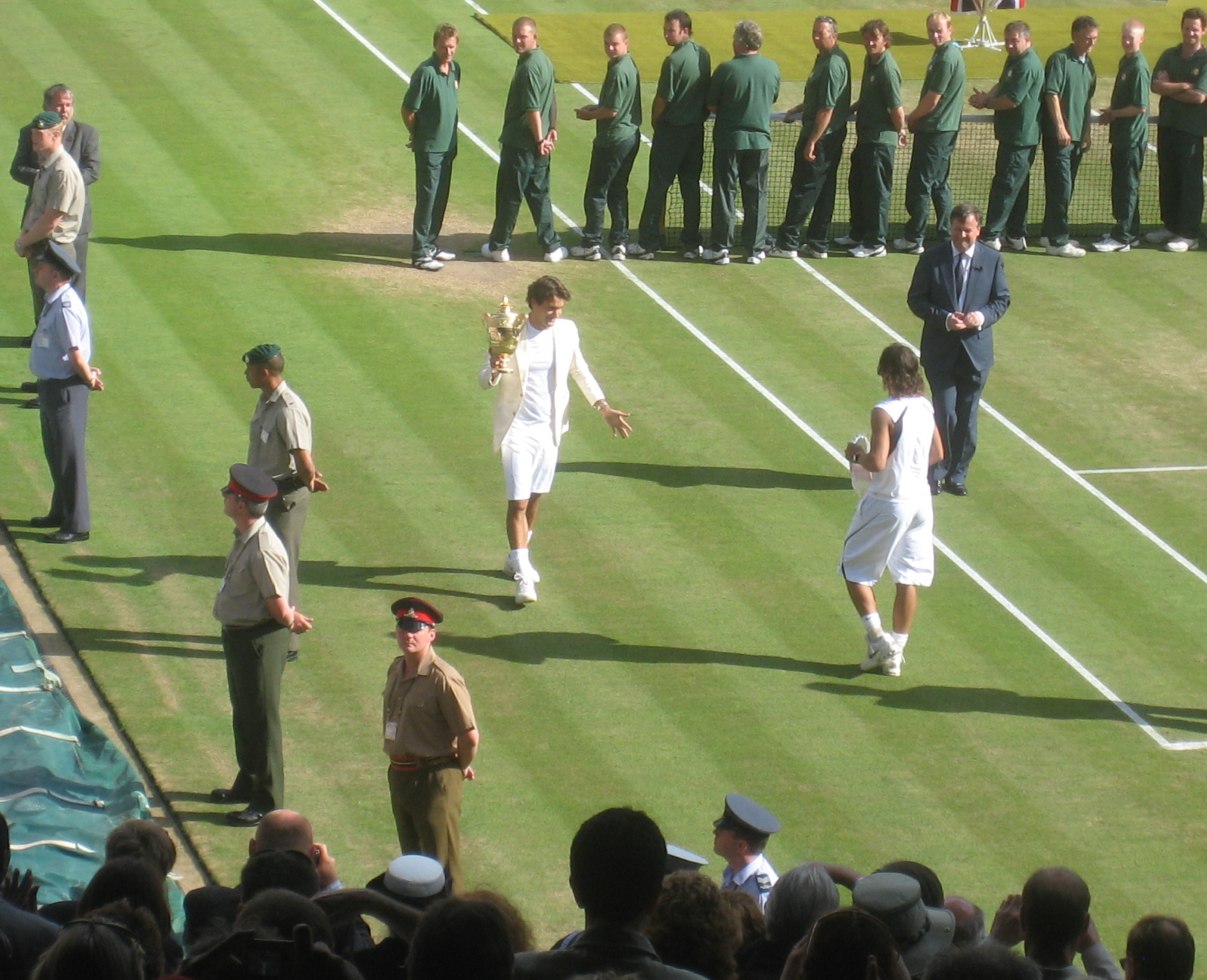
- 2006 Wimbledon Trophy Presentation
- Calendar prize money: $8,343,885

Singles
- Season record: 92–5 (94.85%)
- Calendar titles: 12
- Year-end ranking: No. 1
- Ranking change from previous year: =

Grand Slam & significant results
- Australian Open: W
- French Open: F
- Wimbledon: W
- US Open: W
- Other tournaments
- Tour Finals: W

Davis Cup
- Davis Cup: WG PO (adv. to 2007 WG)
- Last updated on: 31 December 2006.

In what is widely considered to be one of the greatest individual tennis seasons of all time and Federer's best, Roger Federer was dominant in 2006, finishing the year with a 92–5 record. The world No. 1 maintained his ranking for the full calendar year and reached all four major finals in 2006, winning three of them. His only loss at the majors came against Rafael Nadal in the French Open final in four sets, 6–1, 1–6, 4–6, 6–7^{(4–7)}. This was the first time they had met in a major final. In the other three majors of the season, Federer defeated Nadal in the final of Wimbledon, 6–0, 7–6^{(7–5)}, 6–7^{(2–7)}, 6–3. He defeated Marcos Baghdatis, 5–7, 7–5, 6–0, 6–2, at the Australian Open and Andy Roddick, 6–2, 4–6, 7–5, 6–1, at the US Open.

In addition, Federer contested six Masters finals (out of the seven events he entered), winning four on hardcourt and losing two on clay to Nadal. Also, Federer won one ATP 500 series event in Tokyo, three ATP 250 series events in Doha, Halle, and Basel, and captured the year-end championship for the third time in his career.

In December 2011, Stephen Tignor, chief editorial writer for Tennis.com, ranked Federer's 2006 season as the second greatest Open Era season, behind Rod Laver's Grand Slam year of 1969.

== Year summary ==
Federer won three of the four Grand Slam singles tournaments for the second time and ended the year ranked world No. 1, with his points total being several thousand ahead of world No. 2 Nadal.

=== Early hard court season ===
Federer started the year off by winning the Qatar Open in Doha. This was his second consecutive championship in Doha, he defeated Frenchman Gaël Monfils 6–3, 7–6^{(7–5)} in the final.

After traveling down under, Federer won the year's first Grand Slam tournament, the Australian Open, by defeating Cypriot Marcos Baghdatis in four sets. This was Federer's seventh consecutive victory in a Grand Slam final (2003 Wimbledon – 2006 Australian Open), a record to start a career, and second overall only to Pete Sampras's eight consecutive wins (1995 Wimbledon – 2000 Wimbledon). This was Federer's 7th Grand Slam title, which tied him for sixth place in the open era with John McEnroe and Mats Wilander.

Moving back to the Middle East, Federer reached the finals of the Dubai Tennis Championships without losing a set before losing to his budding arch-rival Rafael Nadal 6–2, 4–6, 4–6. This ended the 16-match winning streak that he had started the 2006 season on. It was also the first time Federer had lost a match on a hard court in over a year, the last time coming 13 months earlier in the semifinals of the 2005 Australian Open.

Federer successfully defended his Masters title at the Pacific Life Open in Indian Wells, California, defeating American James Blake in the final 7–5, 6–3, 6–0. This was his third consecutive title in Indian Wells, which set the tournament record for most consecutive titles. This third championship also tied Michael Chang's record of three titles in Indian Wells.

Two weeks later he also successfully defended his Masters title at the Sony Ericsson Open in Miami, Florida, defeating Croatian Ivan Ljubičić in the final 7–6^{(7–5)}, 7–6^{(7–4)}, 7–6^{(8–6)}. With his victory in Miami he picked up his second masters title of the year, and became the first player ever to win the grueling Indian Wells-Key Biscayne double in consecutive years.

=== Clay court season ===
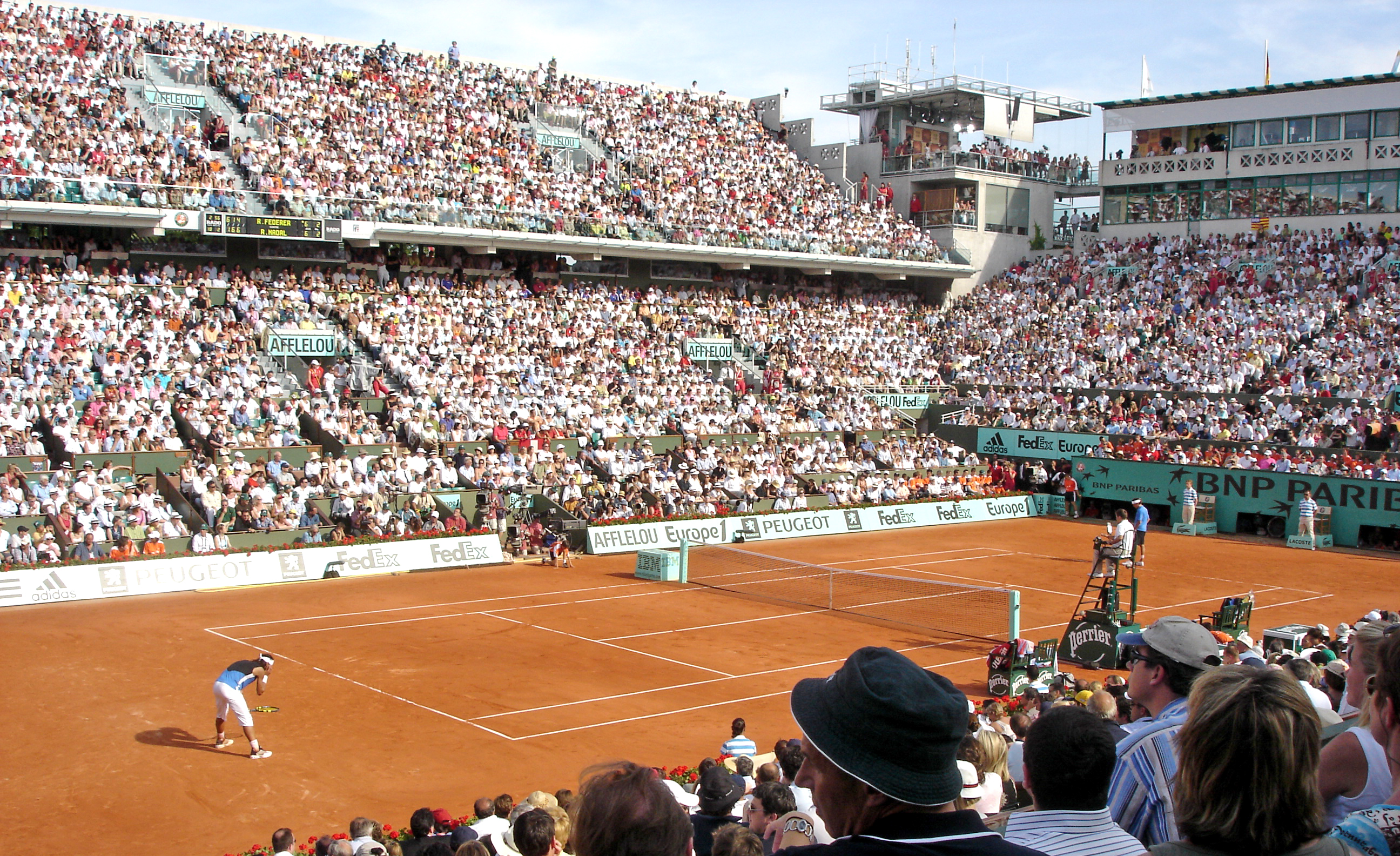
Rafael Nadal and Roger Federer compete at the 2006 French Open.

Federer started the clay-court season by reaching the final of the ATP Masters Series event at Monte Carlo. He opened the tournament with a scare needing three sets to defeat an 18-year-old Novak Djokovic; this was the first match between the two rivals, who played in 50 matches overall. After reaching the final he lost in four sets to Nadal 2–6, 7–6^{(7–2)}, 3–6, 6–7^{(5–7)}.

In Italy Federer had a difficult road to the finals of Rome defeating Nicolás Almagro 6–3, 6–7^{(2–7)}, 7–5 in the quarters and David Nalbandian 6–3, 3–6, 7–6^{(7–5)} in the semifinals. His encounter with Rafael Nadal in the finals saw Federer losing 7–6^{(7–0)}, 6–7^{(5–7)}, 4–6, 6–2, 6–7^{(5–7)} in a five-set, five-hour and five-minute match that culminated in a decisive 7-5 tiebreak. Federer had held two championship points at 6–5 in the fifth set. Because of the physicality and grueling nature of the match, both players skipped the Hamburg Masters the following week.

Federer only dropped two sets en route to the first French Open final of his career. He met the reigning champion Rafael Nadal in the final. Federer had gone undefeated in 2006 except against Nadal, compiling a 44–3 record heading into the finals. He got off to a fast start winning the first set decisively 6–1. But the relentless nature of Nadal's play, constantly hitting high bouncing shots to Federer's one-handed backhand, proved a devastating formula. Federer eventually lost the match in a fourth-set tiebreaker 6–1, 1–6, 4–6, 6–7^{(4–7)}. This ended the many predictions of Federer winning the calendar year Grand Slam in 2006. Although the French Open title eluded him, Federer became one of only two active players who had reached the finals of all four Grand Slam singles tournaments, the other being Andre Agassi.

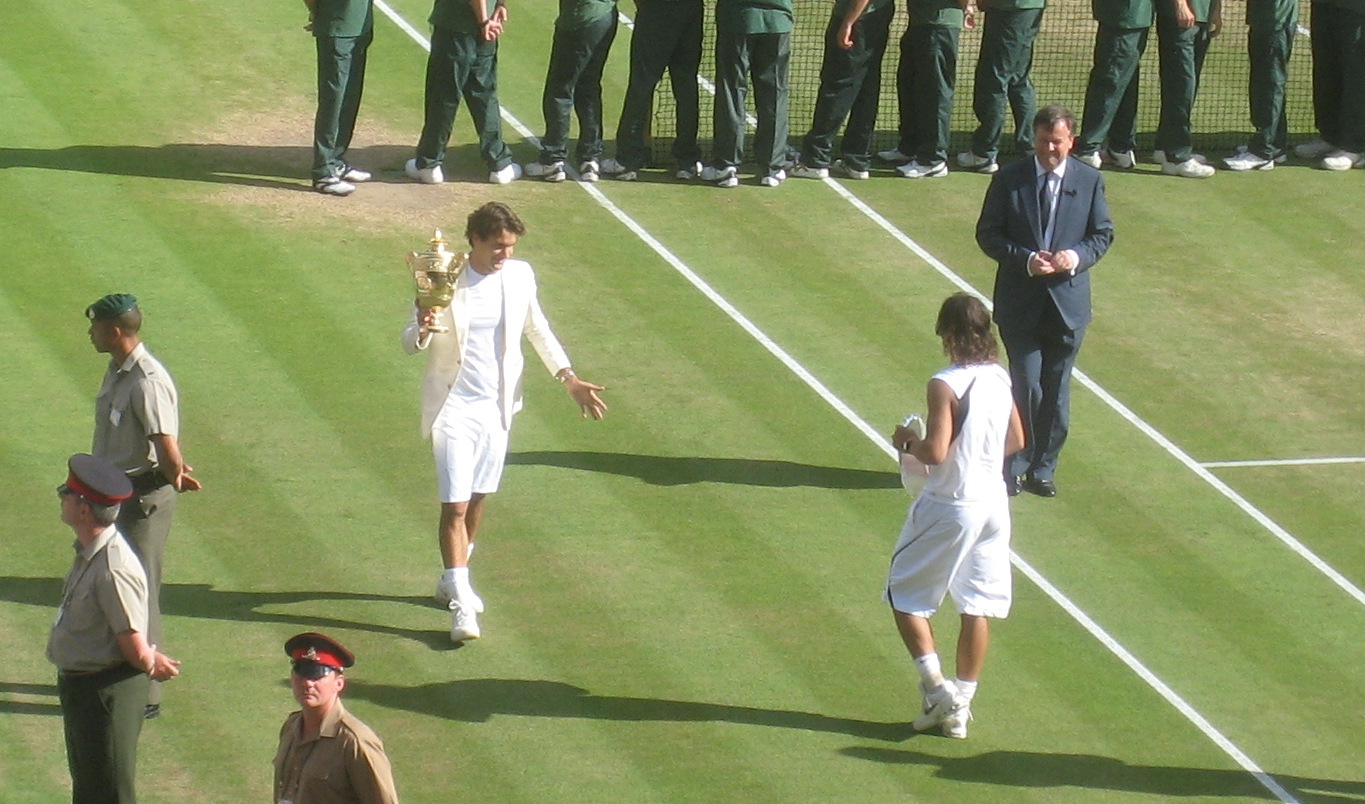
Federer won his fourth consecutive Wimbledon Championship title in 2006.

=== Grass court season ===
Federer won his fourth consecutive title at the Gerry Weber Open in Halle, Germany. Federer had three close third set victories en route to making the final, including a thrilling triple tiebreak match against Olivier Rochus in the quarterfinals 6–7^{(2–7)}, 7–6^{(11–9)}, 7–6^{(7–5)}. In the final he defeated Tomáš Berdych 6–0, 6–7^{(4–7)}, 6–2.

Federer entered Wimbledon as the top seed, trying to become the first man since Pete Sampras (1997–2000) to win Wimbledon in four consecutive years. Federer raced through the tournament without dropping a set and met his arch-rival Rafael Nadal in the finals. Federer had not defeated Nadal all season going 0–4 against Nadal but 5–4 overall heading into the final. Federer again thrashed Nadal in the first set, the same way he had in the opening set at Roland Garros, bageling the Spaniard 6–0. The second set was much closer with Federer taking the tiebreaker 7–5. Federer surrendered his first set of the tournament when he lost the third set in a tiebreaker 2–7. In the fourth set Federer reasserted his superior grass court play and took it by a score of 6–3. Federer won the final 6–0, 7–6^{(7–5)}, 6–7^{(2–7)}, 6–3. This was his fourth Wimbledon title and his 8th Grand Slam title of his career. With this Major title win he tied Andre Agassi, Jimmy Connors, and Ivan Lendl for sixth on the all-time Grand Slam list behind Bill Tilden (10), Rod Laver and Björn Borg (11), Roy Emerson (12), and Pete Sampras (14). After Wimbledon, Federer set his sights on winning the US Open.

=== Summer hard court season ===
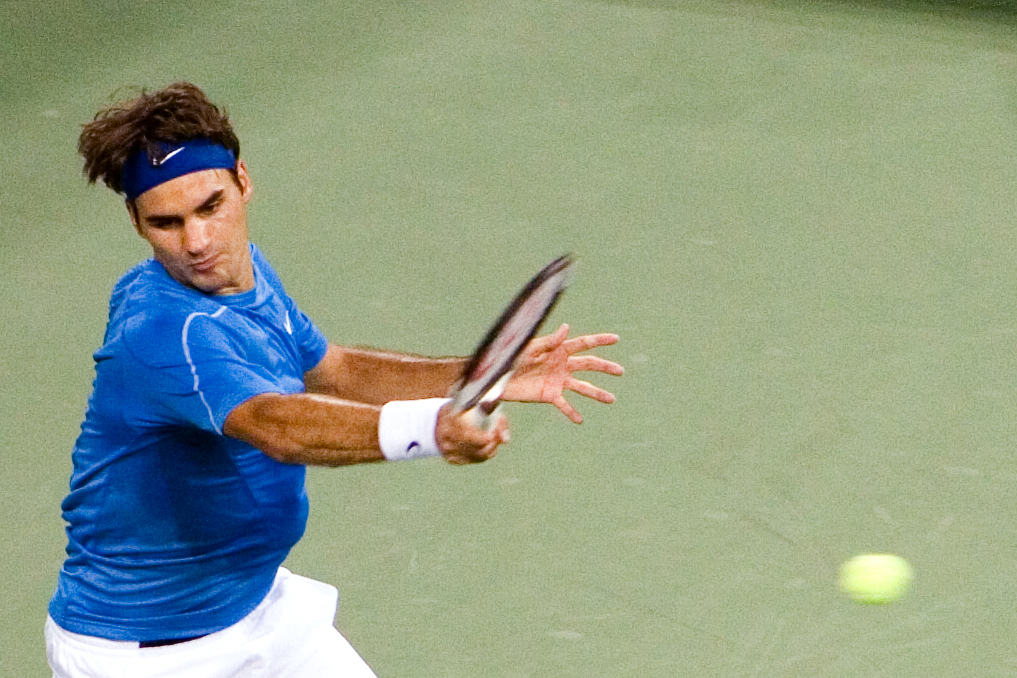
Federer won his third consecutive US Open title in 2006.

Federer then started his North American tour by winning his second Rogers Cup title in Toronto, defeating Richard Gasquet of France in the final 2–6, 6–3, 6–2.

After his victory in Toronto, Federer entered the Cincinnati Masters as the defending champion looking to tie the all-time record he and Nadal set in 2005 of four masters titles in a single season. After reaching the finals of his first eleven tournaments in 2006, Federer was upset by 19-year-old British upstart Andy Murray. Following this loss to Murray, Federer would not lose another match for the remainder of the year. He finished the season with a perfect record of 29–0 (this would continue into 2007 and be part of his career best 41-match winning streak).

During the US Open, the year's last Grand Slam tournament, he defeated American Andy Roddick in four sets 6–2, 4–6, 7–5, 6–1 for his third consecutive title at Flushing Meadows. During the open era, 2006 is the only year in which the same man (Federer) and woman (Justine Henin) reached the finals of all four Grand Slams. This was Federer's 9th Grand Slam title, which put him in sole possession of 6th place on the all-time Grand Slam list.

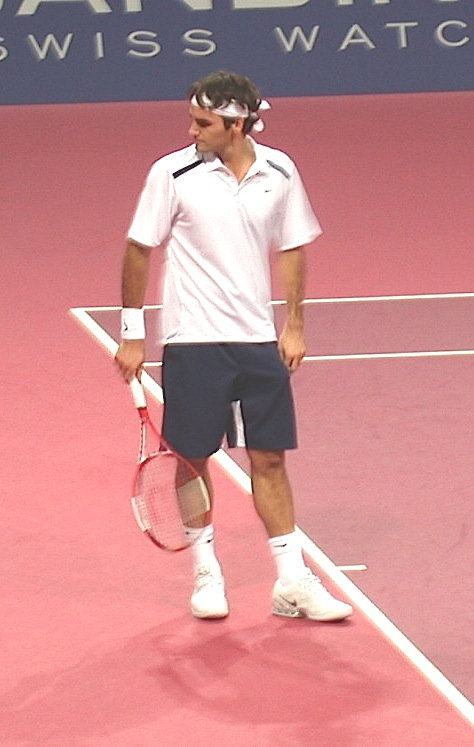
Federer won his first Basel title in 2006.

=== Fall indoor season ===
Tokyo was the last outdoor event that Federer participated in during the season. He defeated Tim Henman in the final, 6–3, 6–3.

With victory in Asia, Federer turned his focus to the indoor circuit of Europe. He entered the Madrid Masters for the first time since 2003. After a close third-round match against Robin Söderling, Federer defeated Fernando González 7–5, 6–1, 6–0 in the final. This was his fourth Masters title of the year, which tied the all-time record held by himself and Nadal in 2005.

Federer entered his hometown tournament, the Swiss Indoors held in Basel, having never won it despite having reached the final in 2000 and 2001. Federer won a final-set tiebreaker against Paradorn Srichaphan in the semifinals, to advance to the final where he defeated González, 6–3, 6–2, 7–6^{(7–3)}. This victory was especially touching for Federer who had grown up in Basel and had been a ball boy at the tournament during his youth.

At the year-ending Tennis Masters Cup in Shanghai, Federer defeated the defending champion David Nalbandian during the round-robin stage. He also scored his second victory of the year over Nadal, 6–4, 7–5 in a thrilling semifinal matchup of the top 2 players in the world. Federer then resoundingly defeated James Blake, 6–0, 6–3, 6–4, in the final to win his third Masters Cup title.

== Season accomplishments ==
Federer won 12 titles in 2006, which included three Grand Slam titles, four ATP Masters titles, and the Tennis Masters Cup. He tied a record for the ATP Tour (since 1990) with Thomas Muster, which was done during the 1995 season.

During the year, he lost to only two players: Nadal in the French Open, Rome, Monte Carlo, and Dubai finals; and Andy Murray in the second round of the Masters Series tournament in Cincinnati. The Cincinnati loss to Murray was Federer's only straight-set loss of the year and the only tournament out of 17 in which he did not reach the final.

His win–loss record for the 2006 season was 92–5, falling slightly behind his 2005 season record of 81–4.

== Matches ==
=== Grand Slam performance ===
Tournament	Round	Result	Opponent	Score
Australian Open	1R	Win	(Uzbekistan) Denis Istomin	6–2, 6–3, 6–2
Australian Open	2R	Win	(Germany) Florian Mayer	6–1, 6–4, 6–0
Australian Open	3R	Win	(Belarus) Max Mirnyi	6–3, 6–4, 6–3
Australian Open	4R	Win	(Germany) Tommy Haas	6–4, 6–0, 3–6, 4–6, 6–2
Australian Open	QF	Win	(Russia) Nikolay Davydenko	6–4, 3–6, 7–6(7), 7–6(5)
Australian Open	SF	Win	(Germany) Nicolas Kiefer	6–3, 5–7, 6–0, 6–2
Australian Open	F	Win (7)	(Cyprus) Marcos Baghdatis	5–7, 7–5, 6–0, 6–2
French Open	1R	Win	(Argentina) Diego Hartfield	7–5, 7–6(2), 6–2
French Open	2R	Win	(Colombia) Alejandro Falla	6–1, 6–4, 6–3
French Open	3R	Win	(Chile) Nicolás Massú	6–1, 6–2, 6–7(4), 7–5
French Open	4R	Win	(Czech Republic) Tomáš Berdych	6–3, 6–2, 6–3
French Open	QF	Win	(Croatia) Mario Ančić	6–4, 6–3, 6–4
French Open	SF	Win	(Argentina) David Nalbandian	3–6, 6–4, 5–2 retired
French Open	F	Loss	(Spain) Rafael Nadal	6–1, 1–6, 4–6, 6–7(4)
Wimbledon	1R	Win	(France) Richard Gasquet	6–3, 6–2, 6–2
Wimbledon	2R	Win	(United Kingdom) Tim Henman	6–4, 6–0, 6–2
Wimbledon	3R	Win	(France) Nicolas Mahut	6–3, 7–6(2), 6–4
Wimbledon	4R	Win	(Czech Republic) Tomáš Berdych	6–3, 6–3, 6–4
Wimbledon	QF	Win	(Croatia) Mario Ančić	6–4, 6–4, 6–4
Wimbledon	SF	Win	(Sweden) Jonas Björkman	6–2, 6–0, 6–2
Wimbledon	F	Win (8)	(Spain) Rafael Nadal	6–0, 7–6(5), 6–7(2), 6–3
US Open	1R	Win	(Chinese Taipei) Yeu-Tzuoo Wang	6–4, 6–1, 6–0
US Open	2R	Win	(United Kingdom) Tim Henman	6–3, 6–4, 7–5
US Open	3R	Win	(United States) Vincent Spadea	6–3, 6–3, 6–0
US Open	4R	Win	(France) Marc Gicquel	6–3, 7–6(2), 6–3
US Open	QF	Win	(United States) James Blake	7–6(7), 6–0, 6–7(9), 6–4
US Open	SF	Win	(Russia) Nikolay Davydenko	6–1, 7–5, 6–4
US Open	F	Win (9)	(United States) Andy Roddick	6–2, 4–6, 7–5, 6–1

==== All matches ====
===== Singles =====
Match	Tournament	Start; Date	Type	I/O	Surface	Round	Opponent	Result	Score
512	(Qatar) Doha	1/2	250	Outdoor	Hard	R32	(Czech Republic) Ivo Minář	W	6–1, 6–3
513	(Qatar) Doha	1/2	250	Outdoor	Hard	R16	(France) Fabrice Santoro	W	7–6(2), 7–6(5)
514	(Qatar) Doha	1/2	250	Outdoor	Hard	Q	(Cyprus) Marcos Baghdatis	W	6–4, 6–3
515	(Qatar) Doha	1/2	250	Outdoor	Hard	S	(Germany) Tommy Haas	W	6–3, 6–3
516	(Qatar) Doha	1/2	250	Outdoor	Hard	Win (1)	(France) Gaël Monfils	W	6–3, 7–6(5)
517	(Australia) Australian Open	1/16	GS	Outdoor	Hard	R128	(Uzbekistan) Denis Istomin	W	6–2, 6–3, 6–2
518	(Australia) Australian Open	1/16	GS	Outdoor	Hard	R64	(Germany) Florian Mayer	W	6–1, 6–4, 6–0
519	(Australia) Australian Open	1/16	GS	Outdoor	Hard	R32	(Belarus) Max Mirnyi	W	6–3, 6–4, 6–3
520	(Australia) Australian Open	1/16	GS	Outdoor	Hard	R16	(Germany) Tommy Haas (2)	W	6–4, 6–0, 3–6, 4–6, 6–2
521	(Australia) Australian Open	1/16	GS	Outdoor	Hard	Q	(Russia) Nikolay Davydenko	W	6–4, 3–6, 7–6(7), 7–6(5)
522	(Australia) Australian Open	1/16	GS	Outdoor	Hard	S	(Germany) Nicolas Kiefer	W	6–3, 5–7, 6–0, 6–2
523	(Australia) Australian Open	1/16	GS	Outdoor	Hard	Win (2)	(Cyprus) Marcos Baghdatis (2)	W	5–7, 7–5, 6–0, 6–2
524	(United Arab Emirates) Dubai	2/27	500	Outdoor	Hard	R32	(Switzerland) Stanislas Wawrinka	W	7–6(3), 6–3
525	(United Arab Emirates) Dubai	2/27	500	Outdoor	Hard	R16	(Kuwait) Mohammad Ghareeb	W	7–6(5), 6–4
526	(United Arab Emirates) Dubai	2/27	500	Outdoor	Hard	Q	(Czech Republic) Robin Vik	W	6–3, 6–2
527	(United Arab Emirates) Dubai	2/27	500	Outdoor	Hard	S	(Russia) Mikhail Youzhny	W	6–2, 6–3
528	(United Arab Emirates) Dubai	2/27	500	Outdoor	Hard	F	(Spain) Rafael Nadal	L	6–2, 4–6, 4–6
-	(United States) Indian Wells Masters	3/6	1000	Outdoor	Hard	R128	Bye		
529	(United States) Indian Wells Masters	3/6	1000	Outdoor	Hard	R64	(Chile) Nicolás Massú	W	6–3, 7–6(4)
530	(United States) Indian Wells Masters	3/6	1000	Outdoor	Hard	R32	(Belgium) Olivier Rochus	W	3–6, 6–2, 7–5
531	(United States) Indian Wells Masters	3/6	1000	Outdoor	Hard	R16	(France) Richard Gasquet	W	6–3, 6–4
532	(United States) Indian Wells Masters	3/6	1000	Outdoor	Hard	Q	(Croatia) Ivan Ljubičić	W	6–2, 6–3
533	(United States) Indian Wells Masters	3/6	1000	Outdoor	Hard	S	(Thailand) Paradorn Srichaphan	W	6–2, 6–3
534	(United States) Indian Wells Masters	3/6	1000	Outdoor	Hard	Win (3)	(United States) James Blake	W	7–5, 6–3, 6–0
-	(United States) Miami Masters	3/20	1000	Outdoor	Hard	R128	Bye		
535	(United States) Miami Masters	3/20	1000	Outdoor	Hard	R64	(France) Arnaud Clément	W	6–2, 6–7(4), 6–0
536	(United States) Miami Masters	3/20	1000	Outdoor	Hard	R32	(Germany) Tommy Haas (3)	W	6–1, 6–3
537	(United States) Miami Masters	3/20	1000	Outdoor	Hard	R16	(Russia) Dmitry Tursunov	W	6–3, 6–3
538	(United States) Miami Masters	3/20	1000	Outdoor	Hard	Q	(United States) James Blake (2)	W	7–6(2), 6–4
539	(United States) Miami Masters	3/20	1000	Outdoor	Hard	S	(Spain) David Ferrer	W	6–1, 6–4
540	(United States) Miami Masters	3/20	1000	Outdoor	Hard	Win (4)	(Croatia) Ivan Ljubičić (2)	W	7–6(5), 7–6(4), 7–6(6)
541	(Monaco) Monte Carlo Masters	4/17	1000	Outdoor	Clay	R64	(Serbia and Montenegro) Novak Djokovic	W	6–3, 2–6, 6–3
542	(Monaco) Monte Carlo Masters	4/17	1000	Outdoor	Clay	R32	(Spain) Alberto Martín	W	6–0, 6–1
543	(Monaco) Monte Carlo Masters	4/17	1000	Outdoor	Clay	R16	(Monaco) Benjamin Balleret	W	6–3, 6–2
544	(Monaco) Monte Carlo Masters	4/17	1000	Outdoor	Clay	Q	(Spain) David Ferrer (2)	W	6–1, 6–3
545	(Monaco) Monte Carlo Masters	4/17	1000	Outdoor	Clay	S	(Chile) Fernando González	W	6–2, 6–4
546	(Monaco) Monte Carlo Masters	4/17	1000	Outdoor	Clay	F	(Spain) Rafael Nadal (2)	L	2–6, 7–6(2), 3–6, 6–7(5)
547	(Italy) Rome Masters	5/8	1000	Outdoor	Clay	R64	(Argentina) Juan Ignacio Chela	W	6–2, 6–1
548	(Italy) Rome Masters	5/8	1000	Outdoor	Clay	R32	(Italy) Potito Starace	W	6–3, 7–6(2)
549	(Italy) Rome Masters	5/8	1000	Outdoor	Clay	R16	(Czech Republic) Radek Štěpánek	W	6–1, 6–4
550	(Italy) Rome Masters	5/8	1000	Outdoor	Clay	Q	(Spain) Nicolás Almagro	W	6–3, 6–7(2), 7–5
551	(Italy) Rome Masters	5/8	1000	Outdoor	Clay	S	(Argentina) David Nalbandian	W	6–3, 3–6, 7–6(5)
552	(Italy) Rome Masters	5/8	1000	Outdoor	Clay	F	(Spain) Rafael Nadal (3)	L	7–6, 6–7(5), 4–6, 6–2, 6–7(5)
553	(France) Roland Garros	5/29	GS	Outdoor	Clay	R128	(Argentina) Diego Hartfield	W	7–5, 7–6(2), 6–2
554	(France) Roland Garros	5/29	GS	Outdoor	Clay	R64	(Colombia) Alejandro Falla	W	6–1, 6–4, 6–3
555	(France) Roland Garros	5/29	GS	Outdoor	Clay	R32	(Chile) Nicolás Massú (2)	W	6–1, 6–2, 6–7(4), 7–5
556	(France) Roland Garros	5/29	GS	Outdoor	Clay	R16	(Czech Republic) Tomáš Berdych	W	6–3, 6–2, 6–3
557	(France) Roland Garros	5/29	GS	Outdoor	Clay	Q	(Croatia) Mario Ančić	W	6–4, 6–3, 6–4
558	(France) Roland Garros	5/29	GS	Outdoor	Clay	S	(Argentina) David Nalbandian (2)	W	3–6, 6–4, 5–2 RET
559	(France) Roland Garros	5/29	GS	Outdoor	Clay	F	(Spain) Rafael Nadal (4)	L	6–1, 1–6, 4–6, 6–7(4)
560	(Germany) Halle	6/12	250	Outdoor	Grass	R32	(India) Rohan Bopanna	W	7–6(4), 6–2
561	(Germany) Halle	6/12	250	Outdoor	Grass	R16	(France) Richard Gasquet (2)	W	7–6(7), 6–7(7), 6–4
562	(Germany) Halle	6/12	250	Outdoor	Grass	Q	(Belgium) Olivier Rochus (2)	W	6–7(2), 7–6(9), 7–6(5)
563	(Germany) Halle	6/12	250	Outdoor	Grass	S	(Germany) Tommy Haas (4)	W	6–4, 6–7(4), 6–3
564	(Germany) Halle	6/12	250	Outdoor	Grass	Win (5)	(Czech Republic) Tomáš Berdych (2)	W	6–0, 6–7(4), 6–2
565	(United Kingdom) Wimbledon	6/26	GS	Outdoor	Grass	R128	(France) Richard Gasquet (3)	W	6–3, 6–2, 6–2
566	(United Kingdom) Wimbledon	6/26	GS	Outdoor	Grass	R64	(United Kingdom) Tim Henman	W	6–4, 6–0, 6–2
567	(United Kingdom) Wimbledon	6/26	GS	Outdoor	Grass	R32	(France) Nicolas Mahut	W	6–3, 7–6(2), 6–4
568	(United Kingdom) Wimbledon	6/26	GS	Outdoor	Grass	R16	(Czech Republic) Tomáš Berdych (3)	W	6–3, 6–3, 6–4
569	(United Kingdom) Wimbledon	6/26	GS	Outdoor	Grass	Q	(Croatia) Mario Ančić (2)	W	6–4, 6–4, 6–4
570	(United Kingdom) Wimbledon	6/26	GS	Outdoor	Grass	S	(Sweden) Jonas Björkman	W	6–2, 6–0, 6–2
571	(United Kingdom) Wimbledon	6/26	GS	Outdoor	Grass	Win (6)	(Spain) Rafael Nadal (5)	W	6–0, 7–6(5), 6–7(2), 6–3
572	Canada Masters	8/7	1000	Outdoor	Hard	R64	(France) Paul-Henri Mathieu	W	6–3, 6–4
573	Canada Masters	8/7	1000	Outdoor	Hard	R32	(France) Sébastien Grosjean	W	6–3, 6–3
574	Canada Masters	8/7	1000	Outdoor	Hard	R16	(Russia) Dmitry Tursunov (2)	W	6–3, 5–7, 6–0
575	Canada Masters	8/7	1000	Outdoor	Hard	Q	(Belgium) Xavier Malisse	W	7–6(4), 6–7(5), 6–3
576	Canada Masters	8/7	1000	Outdoor	Hard	S	(Chile) Fernando González (2)	W	6–1, 5–7, 6–3
577	Canada Masters	8/7	1000	Outdoor	Hard	Win (7)	(France) Richard Gasquet (4)	W	2–6, 6–3, 6–2
578	(United States) Cincinnati Masters	8/14	1000	Outdoor	Hard	R64	(Thailand) Paradorn Srichaphan (2)	W	7–5, 6–4
579	(United States) Cincinnati Masters	8/14	1000	Outdoor	Hard	R32	(United Kingdom) Andy Murray	L	5–7, 4–6
580	(United States) US Open	8/28	GS	Outdoor	Hard	R128	(Taiwan) Jimmy Wang	W	6–4, 6–1, 6–0
581	(United States) US Open	8/28	GS	Outdoor	Hard	R64	(United Kingdom) Tim Henman (2)	W	6–3, 6–4, 7–5
582	(United States) US Open	8/28	GS	Outdoor	Hard	R32	(United States) Vincent Spadea	W	6–3, 6–3, 6–0
583	(United States) US Open	8/28	GS	Outdoor	Hard	R16	(France) Marc Gicquel	W	6–3, 7–6(2), 6–3
584	(United States) US Open	8/28	GS	Outdoor	Hard	Q	(United States) James Blake (3)	W	7–6(7), 6–0, 6–7(9), 6–4
585	(United States) US Open	8/28	GS	Outdoor	Hard	S	(Russia) Nikolay Davydenko (2)	W	6–1, 7–5, 6–4
586	(United States) US Open	8/28	GS	Outdoor	Hard	Win (8)	(United States) Andy Roddick	W	6–2, 4–6, 7–5, 6–1
587	(Switzerland) SUI v. SCG WG Play-offs	9/22	DC	Indoor	Hard	RR	(Serbia) Janko Tipsarević	W	6–3, 6–2, 6–2
588	(Switzerland) SUI v. SCG WG Play-offs	9/22	DC	Indoor	Hard	RR	(Serbia) Novak Djokovic (2)	W	6–3, 6–2, 6–3
-	(Japan) Tokyo	10/2	500	Outdoor	Hard	R64	Bye		
589	(Japan) Tokyo	10/2	500	Outdoor	Hard	R32	(Serbia) Viktor Troicki	W	7–6(2), 7–6(3)
590	(Japan) Tokyo	10/2	500	Outdoor	Hard	R16	(South Africa) Wesley Moodie	W	6–2, 6–1
591	(Japan) Tokyo	10/2	500	Outdoor	Hard	Q	(Japan) Takao Suzuki	W	4–6, 7–5, 7–6(3)
592	(Japan) Tokyo	10/2	500	Outdoor	Hard	S	(Germany) Benjamin Becker	W	6–3, 6–4
593	(Japan) Tokyo	10/2	500	Outdoor	Hard	Win (9)	(United Kingdom) Tim Henman (3)	W	6–3, 6–3
-	(Spain) Madrid Masters	10/16	1000	Indoor	Hard	R64	Bye		
594	(Spain) Madrid Masters	10/16	1000	Indoor	Hard	R32	(Chile) Nicolás Massú (3)	W	6–3, 6–2
595	(Spain) Madrid Masters	10/16	1000	Indoor	Hard	R16	(Sweden) Robin Söderling	W	7–6(5), 7–6(8)
596	(Spain) Madrid Masters	10/16	1000	Indoor	Hard	Q	(United States) Robby Ginepri	W	6–3, 7–6(4)
597	(Spain) Madrid Masters	10/16	1000	Indoor	Hard	S	(Argentina) David Nalbandian (3)	W	6–4, 6–0
598	(Spain) Madrid Masters	10/16	1000	Indoor	Hard	Win (10)	(Chile) Fernando González (3)	W	7–5, 6–1, 6–0
599	(Switzerland) Basel	10/23	250	Indoor	Carpet	R32	(Czech Republic) Tomáš Zíb	W	6–1, 6–2
600	(Switzerland) Basel	10/23	250	Indoor	Carpet	R16	(Spain) Guillermo García-López	W	6–2, 6–0
601	(Switzerland) Basel	10/23	250	Indoor	Carpet	Q	(Spain) David Ferrer (3)	W	6–3, 7–6(14)
602	(Switzerland) Basel	10/23	250	Indoor	Carpet	S	(Thailand) Paradorn Srichaphan (3)	W	6–4, 3–6, 7–6(5)
603	(Switzerland) Basel	10/23	250	Indoor	Carpet	Win (11)	(Chile) Fernando González (4)	W	6–3, 6–2, 7–6(3)
604	(China) Tennis Masters Cup	11/13	WC	Indoor	Hard	RR	(Argentina) David Nalbandian (4)	W	3–6, 6–1, 6–1
605	(China) Tennis Masters Cup	11/13	WC	Indoor	Hard	RR	(United States) Andy Roddick (2)	W	4–6, 7–6(8), 6–4
606	(China) Tennis Masters Cup	11/13	WC	Indoor	Hard	RR	(Croatia) Ivan Ljubičić (3)	W	7–6(2), 6–4
607	(China) Tennis Masters Cup	11/13	WC	Indoor	Hard	S	(Spain) Rafael Nadal (6)	W	6–4, 7–5
608	(China) Tennis Masters Cup	11/13	WC	Indoor	Hard	Win (12)	(United States) James Blake (4)	W	6–0, 6–3, 6–4

== 2006 Tournament schedule ==
=== Singles schedule ===
Date	Championship	Location	Category	Surface	2005 Result	2005 Points	New Points	Outcome
2 January 2006– 7 January 2006	Qatar ExxonMobil Open	Doha (QAT)	ATP International Series	Hard	W	250	250	Winner (defeated Gaël Monfils, 6–3, 7–6^{(7–5)})
16 January 2006– 29 January 2006	Australian Open	Melbourne (AUS)	Grand Slam	Hard	SF	450	1000	Winner (defeated Marcos Baghdatis, 5–7, 7–5, 6–0, 6–2)
20 February 2006– 26 February 2006	Dubai Duty Free Tennis Championships	Dubai (UAE)	ATP International Series Gold	Hard	W	300	210	Final (lost to Rafael Nadal, 6–2, 4–6, 4–6)
6 March 2006– 19 March 2006	Pacific Life Open	Indian Wells (USA)	ATP Masters Series	Hard	W	500	500	Winner (defeated James Blake, 7–5, 6–3, 6–0)
20 March 2006– 2 April 2006	NASDAQ-100 Open	Miami (USA)	ATP Masters Series	Hard	W	500	500	Winner (defeated Ivan Ljubičić, 7–6^{(7–5)}, 7–6^{(7–4)},7–6^{(8–6)})
17 April 2006– 25 April 2006	Monte Carlo Masters	Monte Carlo (MON)	ATP Masters Series	Clay	QF	125	350	Final (lost to Rafael Nadal, 2–6, 7–6^{(7–2)}, 3–6, 6–7^{(5–7)})
8 May 2006– 15 May 2006	Internazionali BNL d'Italia	Rome (ITA)	ATP Masters Series	Clay	A	0	350	Final (lost to Rafael Nadal, 7–6^{(7–0)}, 6–7^{(5–7)}, 4–6, 6–2, 6–7^{(5–7)})
15 May 2006– 22 May 2006	Hamburg Masters	Hamburg (GER)	ATP Masters Series	Clay	W	500	0	Withdrew
28 May 2006– 11 June 2006	French Open	Paris (FRA)	Grand Slam	Clay	SF	450	700	Final (lost to Rafael Nadal, 6–1, 1–6, 4–6, 6–7^{(4–7)})
12 June 2006– 18 June 2006	Gerry Weber Open	Halle (GER)	ATP International Series	Grass	W	225	225	Winner (defeated Tomáš Berdych, 6–0, 6–7^{(4–7)}, 6–2)
26 June 2006– 9 July 2006	The Championships, Wimbledon	Wimbledon (GBR)	Grand Slam	Grass	W	1000	1000	Winner (defeated Rafael Nadal, 6–0, 7–6^{(7–5)}, 6–7^{(2–7)}, 6–3)
7 August 2006– 13 August 2006	Rogers Cup	Toronto (CAN)	ATP Masters Series	Hard	A	0	500	Winner (defeated Richard Gasquet, 2–6, 6–3, 6–2)
14 August 2006– 21 August 2006	Western & Southern Financial Group Masters	Cincinnati (USA)	ATP Masters Series	Hard	W	500	35	Second Round (lost to Andy Murray, 5–7, 4–6)
28 August 2006– 10 September 2006	US Open	New York (USA)	Grand Slam	Hard	W	1000	1000	Winner (defeated Andy Roddick, 6–2, 4–6, 7–5, 6–1)
22 September 2006– 24 September 2006	Davis Cup World Group play-offs: Switzerland vs. Serbia and Montenegro	Geneva (SUI)	Davis Cup	Hard (i)				Switzerland def. Serbia and Montenegro 4–1, advances to 2007 World Group
2 October 2006– 8 October 2006	Japan Open Tennis Championships	Tokyo (JPN)	ATP International Series Gold	Hard	A	0	250	Winner (defeated Tim Henman, 6–3, 6–3)
16 October 2006– 22 October 2006	Mutua Madrileña Masters Madrid	Madrid (ESP)	ATP Masters Series	Hard (i)	A	0	500	Winner (defeated Fernando González, 7–5, 6–1, 6–0)
23 October 2006– 29 October 2006	Davidoff Swiss Indoors	Basel (SUI)	ATP International Series	Hard (i)	A	0	250	Winner (defeated Fernando González, 6–3, 6–2, 7–6^{(7–3)})
12 November 2006– 19 November 2006	Tennis Masters Cup	Shanghai (CHN)	Tennis Masters Cup	Hard (i)	F	500	750	Winner (defeated James Blake, 6–0, 6–3, 6–4)
Total year-end points						6725	8370	▲1645 difference

== Yearly records ==
=== Finals ===
==== Singles: 16 (12–4) ====
Legend Grand Slam (3–1) ATP World Tour Finals (1–0) ATP World Tour Masters 1000 (4–2) ATP World Tour 500 Series (1–1) ATP World Tour 250 Series (3–0)	Titles by surface Hard (9–1) Clay (0–3) Grass (2–0) Carpet (1–0)	Titles by surface Outdoors (9–4) Indoors (3–0)

Outcome	No.	Date	Tournament	Surface	Opponent	Score
Winner	34.	8 January 2006	Qatar Open, Qatar (2)	Hard	(France) Gaël Monfils	6–3, 7–6^{(7–5)}
Winner	35.	29 January 2006	Australian Open, Australia (2)	Hard	(Cyprus) Marcos Baghdatis	5–7, 7–5, 6–0, 6–2
Runner-up	10.	5 March 2006	Dubai Tennis Championships, United Arab Emirates	Hard	(Spain) Rafael Nadal	6–2, 4–6, 4–6
Winner	36.	19 March 2006	Indian Wells Masters, United States (3)	Hard	(United States) James Blake	7–5, 6–3, 6–0
Winner	37.	2 April 2006	Miami Masters, United States (2)	Hard	(Croatia) Ivan Ljubičić	7–6^{(7–5)}, 7–6^{(7–4)}, 7–6^{(8–6)}
Runner-up	11.	23 April 2006	Monte Carlo Masters, France	Clay	(Spain) Rafael Nadal	2–6, 7–6^{(7–2)}, 3–6, 6–7^{(5–7)}
Runner-up	12.	14 May 2006	Italian Open, Italy (2)	Clay	(Spain) Rafael Nadal	7–6^{(7–0)}, 6–7^{(5–7)}, 4–6, 6–2, 6–7^{(5–7)}
Runner-up	13.	11 June 2006	French Open, France	Clay	(Spain) Rafael Nadal	6–1, 1–6, 4–6, 6–7^{(4–7)}
Winner	38.	18 June 2006	Halle Open, Germany (4)	Grass	(Czech Republic) Tomáš Berdych	6–0, 6–7^{(4–7)}, 6–2
Winner	39.	9 July 2006	Wimbledon, England, UK (4)	Grass	(Spain) Rafael Nadal	6–0, 7–6^{(7–5)}, 6–7^{(2–7)}, 6–3
Winner	40.	13 August 2006	Canada Open, Canada (2)	Hard	(France) Richard Gasquet	2–6, 6–3, 6–2
Winner	41.	10 September 2006	US Open, United States (3)	Hard	(United States) Andy Roddick	6–2, 4–6, 7–5, 6–1
Winner	42.	8 October 2006	Japan Open, Japan	Hard	(United Kingdom) Tim Henman	6–3, 6–3
Winner	43.	22 October 2006	Madrid Masters, Spain	Hard (i)	(Chile) Fernando González	7–5, 6–1, 6–0
Winner	44.	29 October 2006	Swiss Indoors, Switzerland	Carpet (i)	(Chile) Fernando González	6–3, 6–2, 7–6^{(7–3)}
Winner	45.	19 November 2006	Year-End Championships, China (3)	Hard (i)	(United States) James Blake	6–0, 6–3, 6–4

== Prize Money Earnings ==
Event	Prize money	Year-to-date
Qatar ExxonMobil Open	$142,000	$142,000
Australian Open	$922,560	$1,064,560
Dubai Duty Free Tennis Championships	$98,600	$1,163,160
Dubai Duty Free Tennis Championships (doubles)	$1,500	$1,164,660
Pacific Life Open	$490,000	$1,654,660
Pacific Life Open (doubles)	$1,750	$1,656,410
NASDAQ-100 Open	$533,350	$2,189,760
Monte Carlo Masters	$200,000	$2,389,760
Monte Carlo Masters (doubles)	$7,050	$2,396,810
Internazionali BNL d'Italia	$200,000	$2,596,810
French Open	$598,350	$3,195,160
Gerry Weber Open	$113,000	$3,308,160
The Championships, Wimbledon	$1,190,725	$4,498,885
Rogers Cup	$400,000	$4,898,885
Western & Southern Financial Group Masters	$15,000	$4,513,885
US Open	$1,200,000	$5,713,885
AIG Japan Open Tennis Championships	$118,000	$5,831,885
Mutua Madrileña Masters Madrid	$450,000	$6,281,885
Davidoff Swiss Indoors	$142,000	$6,423,885
Tennis Masters Cup	$1,520,000	$7,943,885
		$8,343,885

== See also ==
- Roger Federer
- Roger Federer career statistics
