= 2005 Qatar Open =

- Date: 3–10 January 2005
- Edition: 13th
- Category: ATP International Series
- Draw: 32S / 16D
- Prize money: $975,000
- Surface: Hard
- Location: Doha, Qatar

Champions

Singles
- (Switzerland) Roger Federer

Doubles
- (Spain) Albert Costa / (Spain) Rafael Nadal
← 2004 ·	ATP Qatar Open	· 2006 →

The 2005 Qatar Open, known as the 2005 Qatar ExxonMobil Open, for sponsorship reasons, was a men's ATP tournament held in Doha, Qatar. It was the 13th edition of the tournament and was held from 3 January through 10 January 2005. First-seeded Roger Federer won the singles title.

== Finals ==
=== Singles ===
(Switzerland) Roger Federer defeated (Croatia) Ivan Ljubičić, 6–3, 6–1

- It was Federer's 1st title of the year and the 23rd of his career.

=== Doubles ===
(Spain) Albert Costa / (Spain) Rafael Nadal defeated (Romania) Andrei Pavel / (Russia) Mikhail Youzhny, 6–3, 4–6, 6–3

- It was Costa's only title of the year and the 13th of his career. It was Nadal's 1st title of the year and the 4th of his career.
