= 2005 Qatar Open – Doubles =

Doubles
- 2005 Qatar Open

Final
- Champions: (Spain) Albert Costa (Spain) Rafael Nadal
- Runners-up: (Romania) Andrei Pavel (Russia) Mikhail Youzhny
- Score: 6–3, 4–6, 6–3

Details
- Draw: 16
- Seeds: 4

Events
| Singles | Doubles |
| ← 2004 · | ATP Qatar Open | · 2006 → |

Martin Damm and Cyril Suk were the defending champions. Damm partnered with Jared Palmer, losing in the first round. Suk partnered with Pavel Vízner, losing in the quarterfinals.

Albert Costa and Rafael Nadal won in the final 6–3, 4–6, 6–3, against Andrei Pavel and Mikhail Youzhny.

== Seeds ==
1. (Czech Republic) Cyril Suk / (Czech Republic) Pavel Vízner (quarterfinals)
2. (France) Nicolas Mahut / (France) Fabrice Santoro (semifinals)
3. (Czech Republic) Martin Damm / (United States) Jared Palmer (first round)
4. (Czech Republic) František Čermák / (Czech Republic) Leoš Friedl (quarterfinals)

== Draw ==
=== Key ===
- Q = Qualifier
- WC = Wild card
- LL = Lucky loser
- Alt = Alternate
- SE = Special exempt
- PR = Protected ranking
- ITF = ITF entry
- JE = Junior exempt
- w/o = Walkover
- r = Retired
- d = Defaulted
- SR = Special ranking

=== Draw ===
First round
1 | (Czech Republic) C Suk (Czech Republic) P Vízner | 6 | 7
(Czech Republic) T Cibulec (South Africa) J Coetzee | 4 | 5
(Russia) I Andreev (Russia) N Davydenko | 6 | 7^{7}
(Poland) M Fyrstenberg (Poland) M Matkowski | 0 | 6^{5}
3 | (Czech Republic) M Damm (United States) J Palmer | 6^{3} | 5
(Argentina) G Gaudio (Spain) F López | 7^{7} | 7
(Romania) A Pavel (Russia) M Youzhny | 7^{7} | 6
(Switzerland) Y Allegro (Germany) M Kohlmann | 6^{5} | 4
WC | (France) S Grosjean (France) G Monfils | 3 | 3
(Spain) A Costa (Spain) R Nadal | 6 | 6
(Slovakia) K Beck (South Korea) H-l Lee | 0 | 4
4 | (Czech Republic) F Čermák (Czech Republic) L Friedl | 6 | 6
(Germany) A Waske (Netherlands) R Wassen | 6 | 6
(Sweden) T Johansson (Croatia) I Ljubičić | 3 | 1
WC | (Kuwait) M al Ghareeb (Qatar) A Ebrahim | 2 | 3
2 | (France) N Mahut (France) F Santoro | 6 | 6

Quarterfinals
1 | (Czech Republic) C Suk (Czech Republic) P Vízner | 3 | 0
(Russia) I Andreev (Russia) N Davydenko | 6 | 6
(Argentina) G Gaudio (Spain) F López | 6^{2} | 4
(Romania) A Pavel (Russia) M Youzhny | 7^{7} | 6
(Spain) A Costa (Spain) R Nadal | 6 | 6
4 | (Czech Republic) F Čermák (Czech Republic) L Friedl | 4 | 2
(Germany) A Waske (Netherlands) R Wassen | 6 | 3 | 4
2 | (France) N Mahut (France) F Santoro | 1 | 6 | 6

Semifinals
(Russia) I Andreev (Russia) N Davydenko | 3 | 2
(Romania) A Pavel (Russia) M Youzhny | 6 | 6
(Spain) A Costa (Spain) R Nadal | 5 | 6 | 7^{7}
2 | (France) N Mahut (France) F Santoro | 7 | 4 | 6^{0}

Final
(Romania) A Pavel (Russia) M Youzhny | 3 | 6 | 3
(Spain) A Costa (Spain) R Nadal | 6 | 4 | 6
