= 2006 Qatar Open – Singles =

Singles
- 2006 Qatar Open

Final
- Champion: (Switzerland) Roger Federer
- Runner-up: (France) Gaël Monfils
- Score: 6–3, 7–6^{(7–5)}

Details
- Draw: 32 (4 Q / 3 WC )
- Seeds: 8

Events
Singles	Doubles
← 2005 ·	ATP Qatar Open	· 2007 →

Defending champion Roger Federer defeated Gaël Monfils 6–3, 7–6^{(7–5)} to win the 2006 Qatar Open singles tennis tournament. He did not lose a single set in the entire tournament.

== Seeds ==
1. (Switzerland) Roger Federer (champion)
2. (Russia) Nikolay Davydenko (quarterfinals)
3. (France) Richard Gasquet (first round)
4. (France) Sébastien Grosjean (first round)
5. (Russia) Igor Andreev (first round)
6. (Belgium) Olivier Rochus (first round)
7. (France) Gaël Monfils (finalist)
8. (Spain) Feliciano López (second round)

== Draw ==
=== Key ===
- Q = Qualifier
- WC = Wild card
- LL = Lucky loser
- Alt = Alternate
- ITF = ITF entry
- PR = Protected ranking
- SR = Special ranking
- SE = Special exempt
- JE = Junior exempt
- JR = Junior Accelerator Programme entrant
- CO = College Accelerator Programme entrant
- NG = Next Gen Accelerator Program entrant
- w/o = Walkover
- r = Retired
- d = Defaulted

=== Finals ===
Semifinals
1	(Switzerland) Roger Federer	6	6
(Germany) Tommy Haas	3	3
7	(France) Gaël Monfils	6	6
(Italy) Filippo Volandri	3	4

Final
1	(Switzerland) Roger Federer	6	7^{7}
7	(France) Gaël Monfils	3	6^{5}

=== Section 1 ===
First round
1	(Switzerland) R Federer	6	6
WC	(Czech Republic) I Minář	1	3
(France) F Santoro	6	2	6
Q	(Austria) O Marach	0	6	4
WC	(Qatar) S Khalfan	1	1
(Cyprus) M Baghdatis	6	6
(Romania) V Hănescu	4	6^{2}
8	(Spain) F López	6	7^{7}
3	(France) R Gasquet	4	4
(United Kingdom) T Henman	6	6
(Germany) T Haas	5	6	7
(Switzerland) S Wawrinka	7	2	5
(Russia) M Youzhny	1	6	6
(Sweden) J Björkman	6	3	4
(Italy) D Sanguinetti	2	7^{7}	7^{7}
6	(Belgium) O Rochus	6	6^{4}	6^{5}

Second round
1	(Switzerland) R Federer	7^{7}	7^{7}
(France) F Santoro	6^{2}	6^{5}
(Cyprus) M Baghdatis	6	3	7
8	(Spain) F López	2	6	5
(United Kingdom) T Henman	2	6^{5}
(Germany) T Haas	6	7^{7}
(Russia) M Youzhny	6	6
(Italy) D Sanguinetti	2	3

Quarterfinals
1	(Switzerland) R Federer	6	6
(Cyprus) M Baghdatis	4	3
(Germany) T Haas	6	6
(Russia) M Youzhny	4	3

Semifinals
1	(Switzerland) R Federer	6	6
(Germany) T Haas	3	3

=== Section 2 ===
First round
7	(France) G Monfils	7	6
(Czech Republic) T Zíb	5	4
(Belarus) M Mirnyi	4	6	6^{3}
(South Africa) W Moodie	6	4	7^{7}
Q	(Serbia and Montenegro) J Tipsarević	5	2
(Russia) D Tursunov	7	6
WC	(Morocco) Y El Aynaoui	6	6
3	(France) S Grosjean	4	4
5	(Russia) I Andreev	5	6	5
Q	(Italy) P Starace	7	1	7
(Italy) F Volandri	6	6
Q	(France) N Mahut	4	4
(Romania) A Pavel	6	6^{2}	6^{1}
(Czech Republic) R Vik	2	7^{7}	7^{7}
(Belgium) C Rochus	3	1
2	(Russia) N Davydenko	6	6

Second round
7	(France) G Monfils	7^{7}	6
(South Africa) W Moodie	6^{3}	4
(Russia) D Tursunov	7^{7}	6
WC	(Morocco) Y El Aynaoui	6^{1}	2
Q	(Italy) P Starace	4	3
(Italy) F Volandri	6	6
(Czech Republic) R Vik	3	4
2	(Russia) N Davydenko	6	6

Quarterfinals
7	(France) G Monfils	6	7^{7}
(Russia) D Tursunov	2	6^{4}
(Italy) F Volandri	6	6
2	(Russia) N Davydenko	3	4

Semifinals
7	(France) G Monfils	6	6
(Italy) F Volandri	3	4
