= 2005 Qatar Open – Singles =

Singles
- 2005 Qatar Open

Final
- Champion: (Switzerland) Roger Federer
- Runner-up: (Croatia) Ivan Ljubičić
- Score: 6–3, 6–1

Details
- Draw: 32
- Seeds: 8

Events
Singles	Doubles
← 2004 ·	ATP Qatar Open	· 2006 →

Roger Federer defeated Ivan Ljubičić 6–3, 6–1 to win the 2005 Qatar Open singles competition. He did not lose a single set in the entire tournament.

Nicolas Escudé was the defending champion but did not defend his title.

== Seeds ==
1. (Switzerland) Roger Federer (champion)
2. (Argentina) Gastón Gaudio (first round)
3. (France) Sébastien Grosjean (quarterfinals)
4. (Russia) Mikhail Youzhny (first round)
5. (Romania) Andrei Pavel (first round)
6. (Croatia) Ivan Ljubičić (final)
7. (Spain) Feliciano López (quarterfinals)
8. (Russia) Nikolay Davydenko (semifinals)

== Draws ==
=== Key ===
- Q = Qualifier
- WC = Wild card
- LL = Lucky loser
- Alt = Alternate
- SE = Special exempt
- PR = Protected ranking
- ITF = ITF entry
- JE = Junior exempt
- w/o = Walkover
- r = Retired
- d = Defaulted
- SR = Special ranking

=== Finals ===
Semifinals
1	(Switzerland) Roger Federer	6	6
8	(Russia) Nikolay Davydenko	3	4
6	(Croatia) Ivan Ljubičić	6	7^{7}
(Spain) Albert Costa	3	6^{4}

Final
1	(Switzerland) Roger Federer	6	6
6	(Croatia) Ivan Ljubičić	3	1

=== Section 1 ===
First round
1	(Switzerland) R Federer	6	6
(Spain) D Ferrer	1	1
(Czech Republic) J Hernych	3	5
(United Kingdom) G Rusedski	6	7
(France) N Mahut	6	3	4
Q	(Italy) U Vico	4	6	6
(Italy) F Volandri	5	3
7	(Spain) F López	7	6
3	(France) S Grosjean	7^{7}	6
(Luxembourg) G Müller	6^{3}	2
Q	(Ukraine) S Stakhovsky	0	1
(South Korea) H-T Lee	6	6
(Slovakia) K Beck	6	6
(Russia) I Andreev	3	4
(Croatia) I Karlović	6^{7}	3
8	(Russia) N Davydenko	7^{9}	6

Second round
1	(Switzerland) R Federer	6	6
(United Kingdom) G Rusedski	3	4
Q	(Italy) U Vico	2	6^{6}
7	(Spain) F López	6	7^{8}
3	(France) S Grosjean	6	6
(South Korea) H-T Lee	3	0
(Slovakia) K Beck	6^{2}	2
8	(Russia) N Davydenko	7^{7}	6

Quarterfinals
1	(Switzerland) R Federer	6	6
7	(Spain) F López	1	2
3	(France) S Grosjean	6	3	2
8	(Russia) N Davydenko	2	6	6

Semifinals
1	(Switzerland) R Federer	6	6
8	(Russia) N Davydenko	3	4

=== Section 2 ===
First round
6	(Croatia) I Ljubičić	6	6
Q	(Switzerland) S Wawrinka	3	4
WC	(Spain) M López	7	7^{7}
(Czech Republic) B Ulihrach	5	6^{2}
WC	(Qatar) M Abdulla	2	2
(Spain) F Verdasco	6	6
(Spain) R Nadal	6	7^{7}
4	(Russia) M Youzhny	3	6^{3}
5	(Romania) A Pavel	5	7^{10}	4
Q	(Switzerland) M Chiudinelli	7	6^{8}	6
(Spain) D Sánchez	3	4
(Spain) A Costa	6	6
(France) F Santoro	6	6
(Sweden) T Johansson	4	2
WC	(France) G Monfils	6	7^{7}
2	(Argentina) G Gaudio	4	6^{4}

Second round
6	(Croatia) I Ljubičić	6	6
WC	(Spain) M López	1	4
(Spain) F Verdasco	2	4
(Spain) R Nadal	6	6
Q	(Switzerland) M Chiudinelli	3	2
(Spain) A Costa	6	6
(France) F Santoro	6	4	7
WC	(France) G Monfils	2	6	5

Quarterfinals
6	(Croatia) I Ljubičić	6	6^{3}	6
(Spain) R Nadal	2	7^{7}	3
(Spain) A Costa	6	3
(France) F Santoro	2	0^{r}

Semifinals
6	(Croatia) I Ljubičić	6	7^{7}
(Spain) A Costa	3	6^{4}
