= 2006 Qatar Open – Doubles =

Doubles
- 2006 Qatar Open

Final
- Champions: (Sweden) Jonas Björkman (Belarus) Max Mirnyi
- Runners-up: (Belgium) Christophe Rochus (Belgium) Olivier Rochus
- Score: 2–6, 6–3, [10–8]

Details
- Draw: 16
- Seeds: 4

Events
Singles	Doubles
← 2005 ·	ATP Qatar Open	· 2007 →

Albert Costa and Rafael Nadal were the defending champions, but did not participate this year.

Jonas Björkman and Max Mirnyi won in the final 2–6, 6–3, [10–8], against Christophe Rochus and Olivier Rochus.

== Seeds ==
1. (Sweden) Jonas Björkman / (Belarus) Max Mirnyi (champions)
2. (France) Fabrice Santoro / (Serbia and Montenegro) Nenad Zimonjić (quarterfinals)
3. (India) Mahesh Bhupathi / (South Africa) Wesley Moodie (first round)
4. (Czech Republic) František Čermák / (Czech Republic) Leoš Friedl (first round)

== Draw ==
=== Key ===
- Q = Qualifier
- WC = Wild card
- LL = Lucky loser
- Alt = Alternate
- SE = Special exempt
- PR = Protected ranking
- ITF = ITF entry
- JE = Junior exempt
- w/o = Walkover
- r = Retired
- d = Defaulted
- SR = Special ranking

=== Draw ===
First round
1	(Sweden) J Björkman (Belarus) M Mirnyi	4	6	[10]
(France) J Benneteau (France) N Mahut	6	4	[7]
Alt	(Italy) P Starace (Russia) D Tursunov	6	6
(France) G Monfils (Switzerland) S Wawrinka	4	4
3	(India) M Bhupathi (South Africa) W Moodie	4	4
WC	(Poland) Ł Kubot (Austria) O Marach	6	6
(Romania) A Pavel (Russia) M Youzhny	7^{7}	3	[13]
(Russia) I Andreev (Russia) N Davydenko	6^{2}	6	[15]
Alt	(South Africa) J Coetzee (Netherlands) R Wassen	6	6
(Germany) T Haas (Spain) F López	4	4
(Belgium) C Rochus (Belgium) O Rochus	7^{9}	1	[16]
4	(Czech Republic) F Čermák (Czech Republic) L Friedl	6^{7}	6	[14]
WC	(Morocco) YE Aynaoui (Qatar) S Khalfan	4	3
(Cyprus) M Baghdatis (Czech Republic) T Zíb	6	6
(Italy) D Sanguinetti (Italy) F Volandri	3	0
2	(France) F Santoro (Serbia and Montenegro) N Zimonjić	6	6

Quarterfinals
1	(Sweden) J Björkman (Belarus) M Mirnyi	4	6	[10]
Alt	(Italy) P Starace (Russia) D Tursunov	6	0	[5]
WC	(Poland) Ł Kubot (Austria) O Marach	6	4	[12]
(Russia) I Andreev (Russia) N Davydenko	3	6	[10]
Alt	(South Africa) J Coetzee (Netherlands) R Wassen	2	5
(Belgium) C Rochus (Belgium) O Rochus	6	7
(Cyprus) M Baghdatis (Czech Republic) T Zíb	6	6
2	(France) F Santoro (Serbia and Montenegro) N Zimonjić	4	4

Semifinals
1	(Sweden) J Björkman (Belarus) M Mirnyi	6	6
WC	(Poland) Ł Kubot (Austria) O Marach	3	4
(Belgium) C Rochus (Belgium) O Rochus	6	6
(Cyprus) M Baghdatis (Czech Republic) T Zíb	2	2

Final
1	(Sweden) J Björkman (Belarus) M Mirnyi	2	6	[10]
(Belgium) C Rochus (Belgium) O Rochus	6	3	[8]
