= 2006 Qatar Open =

- Date: 2–7 January 2006
- Edition: 14th
- Category: International Series
- Draw: 32S / 16D
- Prize money: $975,000
- Surface: Hard / outdoor
- Location: Doha, Qatar

Champions

Singles
- (Switzerland) Roger Federer

Doubles
- (Sweden) Jonas Björkman / (Belarus) Max Mirnyi
- ATP Qatar Open

The 2006 Qatar Open, known as the 2006 Qatar ExxonMobil Open, for sponsorship reasons, was an ATP Tour men's tennis tournament held in Doha, Qatar from 2 January until 7 January 2006. First-seeded Roger Federer won his second consecutive singles title at the event.

== Finals ==
=== Singles ===
(Switzerland) Roger Federer defeated (France) Gaël Monfils, 6–3, 7–6^{(7–5)}

- It was Federer's 1st singles title of the year and the 34th of his career.

=== Doubles ===
(Sweden) Jonas Björkman / (Belarus) Max Mirnyi defeated (Belgium) Christophe Rochus / (Belgium) Olivier Rochus, 2–6, 6–3, [10–8]
