= 2006 Davis Cup World Group play-offs =

The World Group play-offs were the main play-offs of 2006 Davis Cup. Winners advanced to the World Group in 2007, and loser were relegated in the 2007 Zonal Regions I.

== Teams ==
Bold indicates team has qualified for the 2007 Davis Cup World Group.

From World Group

- **Austria**
- **Sweden**
- **Spain**
- **Switzerland**
- **Germany**
- Netherlands
- **Romania**
- Slovakia

From Americas Group I

- Brazil
- Mexico

From Asia/Oceania Group I

- South Korea
- Thailand

From Europe/Africa Group I

- **Czech Republic**
- Italy
- Serbia and Montenegro
- **Belgium**

== Results ==
**Seeded teams**

- Austria
- Germany
- Netherlands
- Romania
- Slovakia
- Spain
- Sweden
- Switzerland

**Unseeded teams**

- Belgium
- Brazil
- Czech Republic
- Italy
- Mexico
- Serbia and Montenegro
- South Korea
- Thailand

Home team	Score	Visiting team	Location	Venue	Door	Surface
**Austria**	5–0	Mexico	Pörtschach	Werzer Arena	Outdoor	Clay
**Germany**	4–1	Thailand	Düsseldorf	Rochus Club	Outdoor	Clay
Netherlands	1–4	**Czech Republic**	Leiden	Groenoordhallen	Indoor	Carpet
**Romania**	4–1	South Korea	Bucharest	Club Sportiv Progresul Bucuresti	Outdoor	Clay
Slovakia	2–3	**Belgium**	Bratislava	Sibamac Arena	Indoor	Hard
**Spain**	4–1	Italy	Santander	Real Sociedad de Tenis de La Magdalena	Outdoor	Clay
Brazil	1–3	**Sweden**	Belo Horizonte	Expominas	Outdoor	Clay
**Switzerland**	4–1	Serbia and Montenegro	Geneva	Palexpo	Indoor	Hard

- Austria, Germany, Romania, Spain, Sweden and Switzerland will remain in the World Group in 2007.
- Belgium and Czech Republic are promoted to the World Group in 2007.
- Brazil, Italy, Mexico, Serbia and Montenegro, South Korea and Thailand will remain in Zonal Group I in 2007.
- Netherlands and Slovakia are relegated to Zonal Group I in 2007.

== Playoff results ==
=== Austria vs. Mexico ===
Austria
5
Werzer Arena, Pörtschach, Austria
22–24 September 2006
Clay

Mexico
0

			1	2	3	4	5
1	(Austria) (Mexico)	**Oliver Marach**; Bruno Echagaray	**6**; 2	4; **6**	**7^{7}** 6^{4}	**6**; 4
2	(Austria) (Mexico)	**Jürgen Melzer**; Santiago González	**6**; 2	**6**; 1	**6**; 1
3	(Austria) (Mexico)	**Julian Knowle / Jürgen Melzer**; Bruno Echagaray / Santiago González	**6**; 3	5; **7**	**7**; 5	**7^{7}** 6^{3}
4	(Austria) (Mexico)	**Rainer Eitzinger**; Daniel Garza	**6**; 3	**6**; 1
5	(Austria) (Mexico)	**Oliver Marach**; Carlos Palencia	**6**; 0	**6**; 1

=== Germany vs. Thailand ===
Germany
4
Rochus Club, Düsseldorf, Germany
22–24 September 2006
Clay

Thailand
1

			1	2	3	4	5
1	(Germany) (Thailand)	Tommy Haas; **Danai Udomchoke**	3; **6**	**6**; 2	6^{6} **7^{8}**	**6**; 3	3; **6**
2	(Germany) (Thailand)	**Florian Mayer**; Paradorn Srichaphan	3; **6**	**7^{7}** 6^{4}	3; **6**	**6**; 2	**6**; 3
3	(Germany) (Thailand)	**Michael Kohlmann / Alexander Waske**; Sanchai Ratiwatana / Sonchat Ratiwatana	**6**; 1	**6**; 2	**6**; 0
4	(Germany) (Thailand)	**Alexander Waske**; Paradorn Srichaphan	**6**; 4	**7**; 5	**7^{14}** 6^{12}
5	(Germany) (Thailand)	**Florian Mayer**; Sanchai Ratiwatana	**6**; 1	**6**; 3

=== Netherlands vs. Czech Republic ===
Netherlands
1
Groenoordhallen, Leiden, Netherlands
22–24 September 2006
Carpet (i)

Czech Republic
4

			1	2	3	4	5
1	(Netherlands) (Czech Republic)	Raemon Sluiter; **Jiří Novák**	2; **6**	6^{5} **7^{7}**	**6**; 4	6^{13} **7^{15}**
2	(Netherlands) (Czech Republic)	Robin Haase; **Tomáš Berdych**	2; **6**	4; **6**	4; **6**
3	(Netherlands) (Czech Republic)	Rogier Wassen / Peter Wessels; **Tomáš Berdych / Martin Damm**	6^{4} **7^{7}**	5; **7**	**7^{7}** 6^{2}	6^{4} **7^{7}**
4	(Netherlands) (Czech Republic)	Raemon Sluiter; **Tomáš Berdych**	3; **6**	6^{4} **7^{7}**
5	(Netherlands) (Czech Republic)	**Robin Haase**; Jan Hernych	**6**; 4	**6**; 4

=== Romania vs. South Korea ===
Romania
4
Club Sportiv Progresul Bucuresti, Bucharest, Romania
22–24 September 2006
Clay

South Korea
1

			1	2	3	4	5
1	(Romania) (South Korea)	**Andrei Pavel**; Jun Woong-Sun	**6**; 0	**6**; 4	**6**; 3
2	(Romania) (South Korea)	Victor Crivoi; **Lee Hyung-Taik**	1; **6**	1; **6**	0; **6**
3	(Romania) (South Korea)	**Andrei Pavel / Horia Tecău**; Chung Hee-Seok / Lee Hyung-Taik	2; **6**	**6**; 2	**6**; 3	**7**; 5
4	(Romania) (South Korea)	**Andrei Pavel**; Lee Hyung-Taik	4; **6**	**6**; 4	**6**; 3	**6**; 2
5	(Romania) (South Korea)	**Florin Mergea**; Jun Woong-Sun	**6**; 2	2; **6**	**6**; 4

=== Slovakia vs. Belgium ===
Slovakia
2
Sibamac Arena, Bratislava, Slovakia
22–24 September 2006
Hard (i)

Belgium
3

			1	2	3	4	5
1	(Slovakia) (Belgium)	**Dominik Hrbatý**; Kristof Vliegen	2; **6**	**6**; 4	**6**; 3	3; **6**	**6**; 2
2	(Slovakia) (Belgium)	Michal Mertiňák; **Olivier Rochus**	**7^{7}** 6^{1}	2; **6**	3; **6**	4; **6**
3	(Slovakia) (Belgium)	Dominik Hrbatý / Michal Mertiňák; Olivier Rochus / Kristof Vliegen	2; **6**	**6**; 3	**3**; 0	6; 6	5; **7**
4	(Slovakia) (Belgium)	Dominik Hrbatý; **Olivier Rochus**	2; **6**	3; **6**	3; **6**
5	(Slovakia) (Belgium)	**Lukáš Lacko**; Dick Norman	**7^{7}** 6^{5}	**6**; 3

=== Spain vs. Italy ===
Spain
4
Real Sociedad de Tenis de La Magdalena, Santander, Spain
22–24 September 2006
Clay

Italy
1

			1	2	3	4	5
1	(Spain) (Italy)	Tommy Robredo; **Filippo Volandri**	3; **6**	5; **7**	3; **6**
2	(Spain) (Italy)	**Rafael Nadal**; Andreas Seppi	**6**; 0	**6**; 4	**6**; 3
3	(Spain) (Italy)	**Rafael Nadal / Fernando Verdasco**; Daniele Bracciali / Giorgio Galimberti	**6**; 2	3; **6**	**6**; 3	**7^{7}** 6^{4}
4	(Spain) (Italy)	**Rafael Nadal**; Filippo Volandri	3; **6**	**7**; 5	**6**; 3	**6**; 3
5	(Spain) (Italy)	**David Ferrer**; Andreas Seppi	**6**; 2	**6**; 2

=== Brazil vs. Sweden ===
Brazil
1
Expominas, Belo Horizonte, Brazil
22–24 September 2006
Clay

Sweden
3

			1	2	3	4	5
1	(Brazil) (Sweden)	**Flávio Saretta**; Andreas Vinciguerra	**6**; 4	1; **6**	3; **6**	**6**; 2	**7**; 5
2	(Brazil) (Sweden)	Ricardo Mello; **Robin Söderling**	0; **6**	1; **6**	4; **6**
3	(Brazil) (Sweden)	Gustavo Kuerten / André Sá; **Simon Aspelin / Jonas Björkman**	**7^{8}** 6^{6}	3; **6**	2; **6**	5; **7**
4	(Brazil) (Sweden)	Flávio Saretta; **Robin Söderling**	0; **6**	3; **6**	6^{4} **7^{7}**
5	(Brazil) (Sweden)	Ricardo Mello; Andreas Vinciguerra						**not** **played**

=== Switzerland vs Serbia and Montenegro ===
Switzerland
4
Palexpo, Geneva, Switzerland
22–24 September 2006
Hard (i)

Serbia and Montenegro
1

			1	2	3	4	5
1	(Switzerland) (Serbia and Montenegro)	**Roger Federer**; Janko Tipsarević	**6**; 3	**6**; 2	**6**; 2
2	(Switzerland) (Serbia and Montenegro)	Stanislas Wawrinka; **Novak Djokovic**	4; **6**	**6**; 3	**6**; 2	6^{3} **7^{7}**	4; **6**
3	(Switzerland) (Serbia and Montenegro)	**Yves Allegro / Roger Federer**; Ilija Bozoljac / Nenad Zimonjić	**7^{7}** 6^{3}	**6**; 4	**6**; 4
4	(Switzerland) (Serbia and Montenegro)	**Roger Federer**; Novak Djokovic	**6**; 3	**6**; 2	**6**; 3
5	(Switzerland) (Serbia and Montenegro)	**Marco Chiudinelli**; Janko Tipsarević	**6**; 4	**6**; 1
